= 1995 San Francisco 49ers season =

American football team season

- Owner: Edward J. DeBartolo Jr.
- General manager: Carmen Policy
- Head coach: George Seifert
- Offensive coordinator: Marc Trestman
- Defensive coordinator: Pete Carroll
- Home stadium: 3Com Park

Results
- Record: 11–5
- Division place: 1st NFC West
- Playoffs: Lost Divisional Playoffs (vs. Packers) 17–27
- Pro Bowlers: C Bart Oates; TE Brent Jones; WR Jerry Rice; QB Steve Young; DT Dana Stubblefield; OLB Lee Woodall; MLB Ken Norton Jr. CB Eric Davis; SS Tim McDonald; FS Merton Hanks

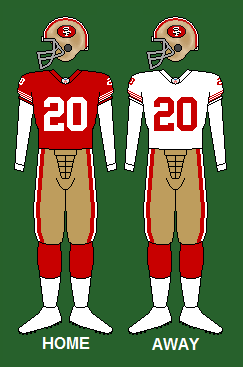
The uniform of the San Francisco 49ers in 1995

The 1995 San Francisco 49ers season was the franchise's 46th season in the National Football League (NFL) and their 50th overall.

Fresh from their victory in the Super Bowl the previous season, the 49ers lost cornerback Deion Sanders to Dallas and running back Ricky Watters to Philadelphia. Despite a mediocre 5–4 start, the 49ers went 11–5 and for the fourth straight time, they repeated as NFC West champions. The 49ers finished the season as the league's top scoring offense, averaging 28.6 points per game. They also finished number one in total defense, surrendering just 275 yards per game, along with being the top rushing defense and finishing second in points allowed. However, a stunning 27–17 loss to Brett Favre and the Green Bay Packers in the divisional round of the playoffs stripped the 49ers of their title defense and ended their season. This would be the first of three consecutive seasons that the Packers beat the 49ers in the playoffs. From 1990 to 2000, the 1995 49ers were the only NFC team to lose a divisional-round playoff game following a first-round bye.

Jerry Rice caught a career-high 122 receptions along with 1,848 receiving yards and 15 total touchdowns.

It was also the final season the 49ers wore their Super Bowl era uniforms. After the season, Rickey Jackson retired.

== Offseason ==
=== NFL draft ===
1995 San Francisco 49ers draft
Round	Pick	Player	Position	College	Notes
1	10	J. J. Stokes	Wide receiver	UCLA	
4	127	Tim Hanshaw	Guard	BYU	began play in 1996.
6	201	Antonio Armstrong	Linebacker	Texas A&M	
7	238	Herb Coleman	Defensive end	Trinity International	
Made roster

== Personnel ==
=== Staff ===
1995 San Francisco 49ers staff
Front office: Owner – Edward J. DeBartolo, Jr.; President – Carmen Policy; Vice President and Director of Football Operations – Dwight Clark; Special Assistant to the President – John McVay; Director of Player Personnel – Vinny Cerrato; Coaching Administrator – Neal Dahlen; Head coaches: Head Coach – George Seifert; Assistant Head Coach – Bill McPherson; Offensive coaches: Offensive Coordinator/Quarterbacks – Marc Trestman; Running Backs – Carl Jackson; Receivers – Larry Kirksey; Tight Ends/Offensive Line Assistant – Mike Solari; Offensive Line – Bobb McKittrick	Defensive coaches: Defensive Coordinator – Pete Carroll; Defensive Line – Dwaine Board; Linebackers – John Marshall; Defensive Backs – Tom Holmoe; Special teams coaches: Special Teams – Alan Lowry; Strength and conditioning: Physical Development Coordinator – Jerry Attaway; Strength Development Coordinator – Michael Barnes

=== Roster ===
1995 San Francisco 49ers roster
Quarterbacks (QB): 11 Jeff Brohm; 6 Cary Conklin; 18 Elvis Grbac; 8 Steve Young; Running backs (RB): 21 Randy Baldwin; 35 Dexter Carter; 32 Ricky Ervins; 20 Derek Loville; 26 Brian O'Neal FB; 27 Adam Walker; Wide receivers (WR): 80 Jerry Rice; 88 Nate Singleton; 83 J. J. Stokes; 82 John Taylor; 89 Chris Thomas; Tight ends (TE): 86 Brett Carolan; 84 Brent Jones; 85 Ted Popson	Offensive linemen (OL): 79 Harris Barton T; 67 Chris Dalman C/G; 63 Derrick Deese G; 77 Tim Hanshaw G; 69 Rod Milstead G; 66 Bart Oates C; 75 Frank Pollack T; 61 Jesse Sapolu G; 76 Kirk Scrafford G/T; 74 Steve Wallace T; Defensive linemen (DL): 72 Oliver Barnett DT; 78 Michael Brandon DE; 96 Dennis Brown DE; 90 Junior Bryant DT; 99 Tim Harris DE; 57 Rickey Jackson DE; 94 Dana Stubblefield DT; 91 Alfred Williams DE; 97 Bryant Young DT	Linebackers (LB): 98 Antonio Goss OLB; 55 Kevin Mitchell MLB; 51 Ken Norton Jr. MLB; 53 Tony Peterson OLB; 50 Gary Plummer OLB; 54 Lee Woodall OLB; Defensive backs (DB): 25 Eric Davis CB; 33 Dedrick Dodge FS; 22 Tyronne Drakeford CB; 43 Darryl Hall SS; 36 Merton Hanks FS; 31 Steve Israel CB; 46 Tim McDonald SS; 23 Marquez Pope CB; Special teams (ST): 3 Tommy Thompson P; 14 Jeff Wilkins K	Practice squad: 19 Darrick Branch WR; 81 Mike Caldwell WR (IR); 95 Herb Coleman DE; 71 Ryan Kuehl DE; 45 Michael Williams CB; Reserve: 41 Toi Cook CB (IR); 40 William Floyd FB (IR); 29 Anthony Lynn RB (IR); 24 Jamal Willis RB (IR); 53 active, 4 inactive, 5 practice squad Rookies in italics

== Preseason ==
Week	Date	Opponent	Result	Record	Venue
1	July 29	at Denver Broncos	L 7–9	0–1	Mile High Stadium
2	August 6	vs. Denver Broncos	L 10–24	0–2	Tokyo Dome
3	August 13	at San Diego Chargers	W 17–6	1–2	Jack Murphy Stadium
4	August 19	Carolina Panthers	W 17–10	2–2	Candlestick Park
5	August 26	Seattle Seahawks	W 17–7	3–2	Candlestick Park

== Regular season ==
=== Schedule ===
Week	Date	Opponent	Result	Record	Venue	Attendance
1	September 3	at **New Orleans Saints**	**W** 24–22	1–0	Louisiana Superdome	66,627
2	September 10	**Atlanta Falcons**	**W** 41–10	2–0	3Com Park	63,627
3	September 17	New England Patriots	**W** 28–3	3–0	3Com Park	66,179
4	September 25	at Detroit Lions	**L** 24–27	3–1	Pontiac Silverdome	76,236
5	October 1	New York Giants	**W** 20–6	4–1	3Com Park	65,536
6	Bye					
7	October 15	at Indianapolis Colts	**L** 17–18	4–2	RCA Dome	60,273
8	October 22	at **St. Louis Rams**	**W** 44–10	5–2	Busch Memorial Stadium	59,915
9	October 29	**New Orleans Saints**	**L** 7–11	5–3	3Com Park	65,272
10	November 5	**Carolina Panthers**	**L** 7–13	5–4	3Com Park	61,722
11	November 12	at Dallas Cowboys	**W** 38–20	6–4	Texas Stadium	65,180
12	November 20	at Miami Dolphins	**W** 44–20	7–4	Joe Robbie Stadium	73,080
13	November 26	**St. Louis Rams**	**W** 41–13	8–4	3Com Park	66,049
14	December 3	Buffalo Bills	**W** 27–17	9–4	3Com Park	65,568
15	December 10	at **Carolina Panthers**	**W** 31–10	10–4	Clemson Memorial Stadium	76,136
16	December 18	Minnesota Vikings	**W** 37–30	11–4	3Com Park	64,975
17	December 24	at **Atlanta Falcons**	**L** 27–28	11–5	Georgia Dome	51,785
Note: Intra-division opponents are in **bold** text.

=== Game summaries ===
==== Week 1: at New Orleans Saints ====
The Niners began their Super Bowl defense on the road and raced to a 24–9 lead despite an injury to Steve Young (accidentally kicked in the back of his neck) that necessitated play by Elvis Grbac for part of the first half. Two second-half Saints scores only closed the final to 24–22 Niners.

==== Week 4: at Detroit Lions ====
The Niners suffered their first defeat of the season in a 27–24 loss at the 0–3 Lions. The game lead tied or changed four times in the second half and a last-second Niners field goal attempt failed.

==== Week 11: vs. Dallas Cowboys ====
Week Eleven: San Francisco 49ers at Dallas Cowboys – Game summary

Quarter	1	2	3	4	Total
**49ers**	17	14	0	7	**38**
Cowboys	0	7	6	7	**20**

at Texas Stadium, Dallas, Texas

- Date: November 12, 1995
- Game time: 1:00 p.m. PST
- Game weather: 48 °F or 8.9 °C, relative humidity 39 percent, wind 15 miles per hour (24 km/h; 13 kn)
- Referee: Bob McElwee
- TV announcers (Fox): Pat Summerall (play-by-play) and John Madden (color commentator)

Game information

**First quarter**

- SF - Jerry Rice 81-yard pass from Elvis Grbac (Jeff Wilkins kick) **49ers 7–0**
- SF - Merton Hanks 38-yard fumble return (Jeff Wilkins kick) **49ers 14–0**
- SF - Jeff Wilkins 26-yard field goal **49ers 17–0**

**Second quarter**

- SF - Derek Loville 1-yard run (Jeff Wilkins kick) **49ers 24–0**
- Dal - Emmitt Smith 1-yard run (Chris Boniol kick) **49ers 24–7**
- SF - Derek Loville 19-yard pass from Elvis Grbac (Jeff Wilkins kick) **49ers 31–7**

**Third quarter**

- Dal - Chris Boniol 26-yard field goal **49ers 31–10**
- Dal - Chris Boniol 37-yard field goal **49ers 31–13**

**Fourth quarter**

- SF - Elvis Grbac 1-yard run (Jeff Wilkins kick) **49ers 38–13**
- Dal - Michael Irvin 8-yard pass from Jason Garrett (Chris Boniol kick) **49ers 38–20**

**49ers**

- Elvis Grbac: 20–30, 305 yards, 2 TD, 0 Int

**Cowboys**

- Troy Aikman: 4–6, 29 yards, 0 TD, 1 Int
- Wade Wilson: 15–26, 134 yards, 0 TD, 2 Int

**Turnovers**

- 49ers - 0
- Cowboys - 4

In one of the biggest upsets of the year, the injury-depleted 49ers thrashed the Cowboys 38–20. Coming into this game, the Cowboys were the NFL's best team, with an 8–1 record. The 49ers, on the other hand, were sitting at 5–4 coming off disappointing losses to New Orleans and the expansion Panthers by a combined score of 24–14. Steve Young was out with injury and Elvis Grbac was the 49ers' starting quarterback, but he had consistently struggled, completing 55 passes for 570 yards but with four INTs. As a result, the Cowboys were 14-point favorites coming in.

On just the second play of the game, Grbac split two defenders and hit Jerry Rice for an 81-yard touchdown, putting the 49ers up 7–0. On the ensuing possession, Michael Irvin fumbled the ball and it was picked up by Merton Hanks for a 38-yard touchdown, putting the 49ers up by two touchdowns just 1 minute and 24 seconds into the game. On the Cowboys' ensuing drive, they again turned it over (Troy Aikman interception) that resulted in a 49ers field goal. The 49ers led 17–0 just 4 minutes and 58 seconds into the game. By halftime, the 49ers had an astonishing 31–7 lead and held on for the win, upsetting the red-hot Dallas Cowboys. The Cowboys turned the ball over four times in the game, while the 49ers had no turnovers.

== Standings ==
NFC West
	W	L	T	PCT	PF	PA	STK
^{(2)} San Francisco 49ers	11	5	0	.688	457	258	L1
^{(6)} Atlanta Falcons	9	7	0	.563	362	349	W1
St. Louis Rams	7	9	0	.438	309	418	L3
Carolina Panthers	7	9	0	.438	289	325	L1
New Orleans Saints	7	9	0	.438	319	348	W1

== Postseason ==
=== Schedule ===
Round	Date	Opponent (seed)	Result	Record	Stadium
Wild Card	First-round bye				
Divisional	January 6, 1996	Green Bay Packers (3)	L 17–27	0–1	3Com Park

=== Game summaries ===
==== NFC Divisional Playoffs: vs. (3) Green Bay Packers ====
NFC Divisional Playoff: Green Bay Packers vs. San Francisco 49ers – Game summary

Quarter	1	2	3	4	Total
Packers	14	7	3	3	27
49ers	0	3	7	7	17

at Candlestick Park

- Date: January 6, 1996
- Game time: 1 p.m. PST
- Game weather: 52 °F or 11.1 °C, relative humidity 85%, wind 5 miles per hour (8.0 km/h; 4.3 kn)
- TV announcers (Fox): Dick Stockton (play-by-play) and Matt Millen (color commentator)
  First quarter
  - GB - Craig Newsome 31-yard fumble return (Chris Jacke kick). Packers 7–0
  - GB - Keith Jackson 3-yard pass from Brett Favre (Chris Jacke kick). Packers 14–0
  Second quarter
  - GB - Mark Chmura 13-yard pass from Brett Favre (Chris Jacke kick). Packers 21–0
  - SF - Jeff Wilkins 21-yard field goal. Packers 21–3
  Third quarter
  - SF - Steve Young 1-yard rush (Jeff Wilkins kick). Packers 21–10
  - GB - Chris Jacke 27-yard field goal. Packers 24–10
  Fourth quarter
  - GB - Chris Jacke 26-yard field goal. Packers 27–10
  - SF - Derek Loville 2-yard rush (Jeff Wilkins kick). Packers 27–17

The 49ers, who were almost 10-point favorites in the game, were upset by the visiting Green Bay Packers. Green Bay set the tone early with a Craig Newsome 31-yard fumble return for a touchdown, and never looked back. Even though Steve Young had more pass attempts, completions and passing yards than his counterpart 1995 League MVP Brett Favre, he failed to throw for a touchdown and finished with 2 interceptions. The 49ers had 4 turnovers in the game. This was the final game for 49ers wide receiver John Taylor.

== Awards and records ==
- Led NFL, Points Scored, 457 Points
- Jerry Rice, Franchise Record, Most Receiving Yards in One Game, 289 Receiving Yards (December 18, 1995)
- Jerry Rice, Franchise Record, Most Receptions in One Season, 122 Receptions
- Jerry Rice, NFL Record, Most Receiving Yards in One Season, 1,848 Receiving Yards
- Jerry Rice, Pro Bowl MVP
