= 1993 San Francisco 49ers season =

American football team season

- Owner: Edward J. DeBartolo Jr.
- General manager: Carmen Policy
- Head coach: George Seifert
- Offensive coordinator: Mike Shanahan
- Defensive coordinator: Bill McPherson
- Home stadium: Candlestick Park

Results
- Record: 10–6
- Division place: 1st NFC West
- Playoffs: Won Divisional Playoffs (vs. Giants) 44–3; Lost NFC Championship (at Cowboys) 21–38
- Pro Bowlers: C Jesse Sapolu; G Guy McIntyre; T Harris Barton; TE Brent Jones; WR Jerry Rice; QB Steve Young; RB Ricky Watters; SS Tim McDonald

The 1993 San Francisco 49ers season was the franchise's 44th season in the National Football League (NFL) and their 48th overall. The 49ers appeared in the NFC Championship Game for the second consecutive season and for the fifth time in six seasons. For the first time since 1978, Joe Montana was not on their active roster; specifically, the 49ers had traded him away to the Kansas City Chiefs in April.

== Offseason ==
Additions	Subtractions
LB Larry Kelm (Rams)	QB Joe Montana (Chiefs)
	NT Michael Carter (retirement)
	WR Mike Sherrard (Giants)
	DE Pierce Holt (Falcons)

=== NFL draft ===
1993 San Francisco 49ers draft
Round	Pick	Player	Position	College	Notes
1	26	Dana Stubblefield *	Defensive tackle	Kansas	
1	27	Todd Kelly	Linebacker	Tennessee	
2	48	Adrian Hardy	Cornerback	Northwestern State	
5	116	Artie Smith	Defensive end	Louisiana Tech	
6	166	Chris Dalman	Center	Stanford	
7	194	Troy Wilson	Defensive end	Pittsburg State	
8	219	Elvis Grbac *	Quarterback	Michigan	played with 49ers beginning in 1994.
Made roster * Made at least one Pro Bowl during career

=== Undrafted free agents ===
1993 undrafted free agents of note
Player	Position	College
Tomur Barnes	Cornerback	North Texas
Junior Bryant	Defensive tackle	Notre Dame
Mike Jarmolowich	Linebacker	Maryland

== Personnel ==
=== Staff ===
1993 San Francisco 49ers staff
Front office: Owner – Edward J. DeBartolo, Jr.; President – Carmen Policy; Vice president of football administration – John McVay; Vice president of player personnel – Dwight Clark; Administrator of football operations – Neal Dahlen; Administrator of college scouting – Tony Razzano; Administrator of pro personnel – Allan Webb; Head coaches: Head coach – George Seifert; Offensive coaches: Offensive coordinator/quarterbacks – Mike Shanahan; Running backs – Carl Jackson; Receivers – Ray Sherman; Tight ends/offensive line assistant – Mike Solari; Offensive line – Bobb McKittrick	Defensive coaches: Defensive coordinator – Bill McPherson; Defensive line – John Marshall; Linebackers – Bob Zeman; Defensive backs – Jeff Fisher; Defensive assistant – Dwaine Board; Defensive assistant – Tommy Hart; Special teams coaches: Special teams coordinator – Alan Lowry; Strength and conditioning: Physical development coordinator – Jerry Attaway

=== Roster ===
1993 San Francisco 49ers roster
Quarterbacks (QB): 13 Steve Bono; 18 Elvis Grbac; 14 Bill Musgrave; 8 Steve Young; Running backs (RB): 35 Dexter Carter; 22 Amp Lee; 43 Marc Logan FB; 44 Tom Rathman FB; 27 Adam Walker; 32 Ricky Watters; Wide receivers (WR): 83 Sanjay Beach; 80 Jerry Rice; 88 Nate Singleton; 82 John Taylor; 86 Odessa Turner; Tight ends (TE): 85 John Brandes; 84 Brent Jones; 81 Jamie Williams	Offensive linemen (OL): 79 Harris Barton T; 65 Harry Boatswain T; 71 Brian Bollinger G; 50 Chris Dalman C; 62 Guy McIntyre G; 76 Alec Millen T; 61 Jesse Sapolu C; 64 Ralph Tamm G; 74 Steve Wallace T; Defensive linemen (DL): 96 Dennis Brown DE; 56 Martin Harrison DE; 58 Todd Kelly DE; 91 Larry Roberts DE; 95 Artie Smith DE; 94 Dana Stubblefield DT; 72 Mark Thomas DE; 97 Ted Washington DT; 77 Karl Wilson DE; 92 Troy Wilson DE	Linebackers (LB): 98 Antonio Goss OLB; 55 John Johnson OLB; 90 Darin Jordan OLB; 52 Larry Kelm MLB; 53 Bill Romanowski OLB; 99 Michael Walter MLB; Defensive backs (DB): 25 Eric Davis CB; 29 Don Griffin CB; 28 Dana Hall FS; 36 Merton Hanks CB; 45 Adrian Hardy CB; 46 Tim McDonald SS; 26 Mike McGruder CB; 38 Damien Russell SS; Special teams (ST): 6 Mike Cofer K; 10 Klaus Wilmsmeyer P	Practice squad: 63 Junior Bryant DT; 20 John Ivlow RB; 54 Kevin Little LB; 17 Darrick Owens WR; 49 Ted Popson TE; Reserve: 63 Derrick Deese G (IR); 59 Keith DeLong LB (IR); 75 Kevin Fagan DE (IR); 67 Roy Foster G (IR); 31 Thane Gash S (PUP); 47 Brian Taylor CB (IR); 89 Wesley Walls TE (IR); Rookies in italics 53 active, 7 reserve, 5 practice squad

== Preseason ==
Week	Date	Opponent	Result	Record	Venue
1	August 1	vs. Pittsburgh Steelers	W 21–14	1–0	Olympic Stadium (Barcelona)
2	August 8	Los Angeles Raiders	W 27–0	2–0	Stanford Stadium
3	August 16	at Denver Broncos	W 16–13	3–0	Mile High Stadium
4	September 21	at Seattle Seahawks	L 0–30	3–1	Kingdome
5	September 28	San Diego Chargers	W 30–14	4–1	Candlestick Park

== Regular season ==
=== Schedule ===
Week	Date	Opponent	Result	Record	Venue	Attendance
1	September 5	at Pittsburgh Steelers	**W** 24–13	1–0	Three Rivers Stadium	57,502
2	September 13	at Cleveland Browns	**L** 13–23	1–1	Cleveland Municipal Stadium	78,218
3	September 19	**Atlanta Falcons**	**W** 37–30	2–1	Candlestick Park	63,032
4	September 26	at **New Orleans Saints**	**L** 13–16	2–2	Louisiana Superdome	69,041
5	October 3	Minnesota Vikings	**W** 38–19	3–2	Candlestick Park	63,071
6	Bye					
7	October 17	at Dallas Cowboys	**L** 17–26	3–3	Texas Stadium	65,099
8	October 24	Phoenix Cardinals	**W** 28–14	4–3	Candlestick Park	62,020
9	October 31	**Los Angeles Rams**	**W** 40–17	5–3	Candlestick Park	63,417
10	Bye					
11	November 14	at Tampa Bay Buccaneers	**W** 45–21	6–3	Tampa Stadium	43,835
12	November 22	**New Orleans Saints**	**W** 42–7	7–3	Candlestick Park	66,500
13	November 28	at **Los Angeles Rams**	**W** 35–10	8–3	Anaheim Stadium	62,143
14	December 5	Cincinnati Bengals	**W** 21–8	9–3	Candlestick Park	60,039
15	December 11	at **Atlanta Falcons**	**L** 24–27	9–4	Georgia Dome	64,688
16	December 19	at Detroit Lions	**W** 55–17	10–4	Pontiac Silverdome	77,052
17	December 25	Houston Oilers	**L** 7–10	10–5	Candlestick Park	61,744
18	January 3	Philadelphia Eagles	**L** 34–37 (OT)	10–6	Candlestick Park	61,653
Note: Intra-division opponents are in **bold** text.

=== Standings ===
NFC West
	W	L	T	PCT	PF	PA	STK
^{(2)} San Francisco 49ers	10	6	0	.625	473	295	L2
New Orleans Saints	8	8	0	.500	317	343	W1
Atlanta Falcons	6	10	0	.375	316	385	L3
Los Angeles Rams	5	11	0	.313	221	367	W1

== Postseason ==
The 49ers' NFC West division championship and 10–6 regular-season record earned them the #2 seed in the NFC and a first-round bye in the playoffs. The Detroit Lions, the NFC Central division winners, also had a 10–6 regular-season record, but the 49ers had the tie-breaker edge because they defeated the Lions in the regular season. The Dallas Cowboys, winners of the NFC East with a 12–4 regular-season record, had the #1 seed and a first-round bye of their own.

=== Schedule ===
Round	Date	Opponent (seed)	Result	Record	Venue
Wild Card	First-round bye				
Divisional	January 15, 1994	New York Giants (4)	W 44–3	1–0	Candlestick Park
NFC Championship	January 23, 1994	at Dallas Cowboys (1)	L 21–38	1–1	Texas Stadium

==== NFC Divisional Playoffs: vs. (4) New York Giants ====
San Francisco 49ers 44, New York Giants 3

NFC Wild Card Playoffs: (4) New York Giants at (1) San Francisco 49ers – Game summary

Quarter	1	2	3	4	Total
Giants	0	3	0	0	3
49ers	9	14	14	7	44

at Candlestick Park

- Date: January 15, 1994
- Game time: 1 p.m. CDT
- Game weather: 49 °F or 9.4 °C, relative humidity 85%, wind 5 miles per hour (8.0 km/h; 4.3 kn)
- Referee: Bernie Kukar

Game information

First quarter

- SF - Ricky Watters 1 yard rush (kick failed). 49ers 6–0
- SF - Mike Cofer 29 yard field goal. 49ers 9-0

Second quarter

- SF - Ricky Watters 2 yard rush (Mike Cofer kick). 49ers 16–0
- SF - Ricky Watters 1 yard rush (Mike Cofer kick). 49ers 23–0
- NYG - David Treadwell 25 yard field goal. 49ers 23–3

Third quarter

- SF - Ricky Watters 6 yard rush (Mike Cofer kick). 49ers 30–3
- SF - Ricky Watters 2 yard rush (Mike Cofer kick). 49ers 37–3

Fourth quarter

- SF - Marc Logan 2 yard rush (Mike Cofer kick). 49ers 44–3

Giants

- Phil Simms. 12-25, 124 yards, 0 TD, 2 Int

49ers

- Steve Young. 17-22, 226 yards, 0 TD, 0 Int
- Ricky Watters. 24 rush, 118 yards, 5 TD

Turnovers

- Giants - 3
- 49ers - 1

Ricky Watters was the story of the game as he rushed for an NFL record 5 touchdowns. He had 118 yards rushing on 24 attempts, along with 5 catches for 46 yards. The Giants were never in the game. The 49ers handed the Giants their worst playoff loss in their history, eclipsing their 37–0 loss to the Green Bay Packers in 1961.

==== NFC Championship: at (1) Dallas Cowboys ====
NFC Championship: (2) San Francisco 49ers at (1) Dallas Cowboys – Game summary

Quarter	1	2	3	4	Total
49ers	0	7	7	7	21
Cowboys	7	21	7	3	38

at Texas Stadium, Irving, Texas

- Date: January 23, 1994
- Game time: 3 p.m. CDT
- Game weather: none (closed dome)
- Referee: Jerry Markbreit

For the second year in a row, the 49ers met the Cowboys in the NFC Championship game. And like the year before, the Cowboys were victorious. The 49ers kept it close in the 2nd quarter, as Steve Young tossed a touchdown pass to Tom Rathman to tie the game at 7. But the Cowboys exploded with 21 consecutive points to go up 28–7 at halftime. The game was put out of reach late in the 3rd quarter when a 42-yard touchdown pass from Bernie Kosar to Alvin Harper put the Cowboys up 35–14. With the loss, the 49ers finished the year at a disappointing 11–7.

== Awards and records ==
- Led NFL, Points Scored, 473 Points
- Led NFL, Total Yards, 6,435 Total Yards
- Jerry Rice, Led NFL, Receiving Yards, 1,503 yards
- Steve Young, Led NFL, Passer Rating, 101.5 Rating
- Steve Young, Led NFL, Touchdown Passes, 29 Passes
