= 1994 San Francisco 49ers season =

American football team season

- Owner: Eddie DeBartolo, Jr.
- General manager: John McVay and Carmen Policy
- Head coach: George Seifert
- Offensive coordinator: Mike Shanahan
- Defensive coordinator: Ray Rhodes
- Home stadium: Candlestick Park

Results
- Record: 13–3
- Division place: 1st NFC West
- Playoffs: Won Divisional Playoffs (vs. Bears) 44–15; Won NFC Championship (vs. Cowboys) 38–28; Won Super Bowl XXIX (vs. Chargers) 49–26
- All-Pros: 5: QB Steve Young; WR Jerry Rice; TE Brent Jones; CB Deion Sanders; S Merton Hanks
- Pro Bowlers: 10: QB Steve Young; RB Ricky Watters; WR Jerry Rice; TE Brent Jones; G Jesse Sapolu; C Bart Oates; DT Dana Stubblefield; CB Deion Sanders; SS Tim McDonald; FS Merton Hanks

The 1994 season was the San Francisco 49ers' 45th in the National Football League (NFL), their 49th overall, and their sixth under head coach George Seifert. This season was highlighted by a victory in Super Bowl XXIX. The championship made San Francisco the first team to win five Super Bowls. After losing to the Dallas Cowboys in the previous two conference championship games, the 49ers made significant acquisitions in the 1994 free agent market. This included the signing of two-sport star Deion Sanders and Cowboys linebacker Ken Norton, Jr. Sanders had a major impact on the team's success, winning the NFL Defensive Player of the Year Award and recording six interceptions. The 49ers won their division, the NFC West, for the eighth time in nine seasons.

Quarterback Steve Young had his best NFL season and won his second MVP award. Young set what was, at the time, the NFL record for highest passer rating in a season – 112.8. Cold Hard Football Facts states that Young's 1994 season is the second greatest passing season in NFL history, behind only Joe Montana's 1989 season. The team set a franchise record for most points scored in the regular season with 505 total. The team also set the NFL playoff record for most points scored in a postseason with 131.

For the third consecutive season, the 49ers met the Cowboys in the NFC Championship Game. From the mid-1980s until the latter 1990s, the AFC was widely regarded as the NFL's weaker conference. At the time of this conference championship game, AFC teams had lost the previous 10 Super Bowls in a row, starting with Super Bowl XIX after the 1984 season. All but two of those losses were by at least 10 points; five of them were by more than 20 points. As a result, the NFC Championship meeting between the 49ers and Cowboys was dubbed by many as "the real Super Bowl." The contest was one of the highest rated non-Super Bowl games in NFL history.

The 49ers beat the two-time defending champion Cowboys 38–28, ending their hopes of becoming the first NFL team to three-peat. San Francisco went on to defeat the San Diego Chargers 49–26 in Super Bowl XXIX. Young was named the game's MVP after throwing a record six touchdown passes. The game also set the record for most points scored by both teams in a Super Bowl with 75 total, a record that stands to this day.

The 1994 49ers ranked #19 on the 100 greatest teams of all time presented by the NFL on its 100th anniversary. As of the 2025 NFL season, this is the last Super Bowl the 49ers have won.

== Offseason ==
=== NFL draft ===
1994 San Francisco 49ers draft
Round	Pick	Player	Position	College	Notes
1	7	Bryant Young * ^{†}	Defensive tackle	Notre Dame	from Atlanta via Indianapolis & L.A. Rams
1	28	William Floyd	Running back	Florida State	from Dallas
2	53	Kevin Mitchell	Linebacker	Syracuse	from Green Bay
2	62	Tyronne Drakeford	Cornerback	Virginia Tech	
3	85	Doug Brien	Kicker	California	Compensatory pick
3	87	Cory Fleming	Wide receiver	Tennessee	
5	153	Tony Peterson	Linebacker	Notre Dame	
6	182	Lee Woodall *	Linebacker	West Chester	
Made roster † Pro Football Hall of Fame * Made at least one Pro Bowl during career

== Training camp ==
The 49ers held training camp at Sierra College in Rocklin, California.

== Personnel ==
=== Staff ===
1994 San Francisco 49ers staff
Front office: Owner – Edward J. DeBartolo, Jr.; President – Carmen Policy; Vice President of Football Administration – John McVay; Coordinator of Football Operations and Player Personnel – Dwight Clark; Director of Pro Personnel – Allan Webb; Director of College Scouting – Vinny Cerrato; Coaching Administrator and Financial Liaison – Neal Dahlen; Head coaches: Head Coach – George Seifert; Assistant Head Coach – Bill McPherson; Offensive coaches: Offensive Coordinator – Mike Shanahan; Quarterbacks – Gary Kubiak; Running Backs – Carl Jackson; Receivers – Larry Kirksey; Tight Ends/Assistant Offensive Line – Mike Solari; Offensive Line – Bobb McKittrick; Offensive Coaches Assistant – Brian Pariani	Defensive coaches: Defensive Coordinator – Ray Rhodes; Defensive Line – Dwaine Board; Linebackers – John Marshall; Defensive Backs – Tom Holmoe; Special teams coaches: Special Teams – Alan Lowry; Strength and conditioning: Physical Development Coordinator – Jerry Attaway; Assistant Strength and Conditioning – Michael Barnes

=== Roster ===
1994 San Francisco 49ers roster
Quarterbacks (QB): 18 Elvis Grbac; 14 Bill Musgrave; 8 Steve Young; Running backs (RB): 35 Dexter Carter; 40 William Floyd FB; 43 Marc Logan; 20 Derek Loville; 27 Adam Walker; 32 Ricky Watters; Wide receivers (WR): 81 Ed McCaffrey; 80 Jerry Rice; 88 Nate Singleton; 82 John Taylor; Tight ends (TE): 86 Brett Carolan; 84 Brent Jones; 85 Ted Popson	Offensive linemen (OL): 79 Harris Barton T; 65 Harry Boatswain T; 67 Chris Dalman G/C; 63 Derrick Deese G; 69 Rod Milstead G; 66 Bart Oates C; 75 Frank Pollack T; 61 Jesse Sapolu G; 64 Ralph Tamm G; 74 Steve Wallace T; Defensive linemen (DL): 96 Dennis Brown DE; 95 Richard Dent DE; 91 Rhett Hall DT; 99 Tim Harris DE; 57 Rickey Jackson DE; 58 Todd Kelly DE; 71 Charles Mann DE; 94 Dana Stubblefield DT; 72 Mark Thomas DE; 92 Troy Wilson DE; 97 Bryant Young DT	Linebackers (LB): 98 Antonio Goss OLB; 90 Darin Jordan LB; 55 Kevin Mitchell MLB; 51 Ken Norton Jr. OLB; 53 Tony Peterson OLB; 50 Gary Plummer MLB; 54 Lee Woodall OLB; Defensive backs (DB): 41 Toi Cook CB; 25 Eric Davis CB; 33 Dedrick Dodge SS; 22 Tyronne Drakeford CB; 28 Dana Hall FS; 36 Merton Hanks FS; 46 Tim McDonald SS; 21 Deion Sanders CB; Special teams (ST): 4 Doug Brien K; 10 Klaus Wilmsmeyer P	Practice squad: 90 Junior Bryant DT; 17 Mike Caldwell WR; 56 Jamal Fountaine LB; 29 John Ivlow RB; 53 active, 4 practice squad Rookies in italics

== Preseason ==
=== Schedule ===
Week	Date	Opponent	Result	Record	Venue	Recap
1	August 5	at Arizona Cardinals	L 7–17	0–1	Sun Devil Stadium	Recap
2	August 12	Denver Broncos	W 20–3	1–1	Candlestick Park	Recap
3	August 18	at San Diego Chargers	W 30–24	2–1	Jack Murphy Stadium	Recap
4	August 26	Seattle Seahawks	W 13–9	3–1	Candlestick Park	Recap

== Regular season ==
In 1994, after the retirements and departures of several stalwarts from the late 1980s and early 1990s teams, the 49ers spent large amounts of money on the addition of several star free agent veterans. The revamp focused mainly on defense, where six new starters including Ken Norton, Jr., Gary Plummer, Rickey Jackson, and Deion Sanders were implemented, all with the ultimate goal in mind of dethroning the Dallas Cowboys. Said safety Merton Hanks, "Those players came in on one and two-year deals and they understood, 'if we do not get it done this year this organization is going to blow itself up.'" Additionally, several rookie players made key contributions to the team, some becoming season-long starters. This included defensive tackle Bryant Young, fullback William Floyd, and linebacker Lee Woodall. The 49ers started slowly early in the season. They defeated the Raiders in a game where Jerry Rice broke the NFL record for career touchdowns, but followed with a 24–17 loss to the Kansas City Chiefs, led by former 49ers quarterback Joe Montana.

Despite victories over the Rams and Saints, the 49ers offensive line was struggling, having lost four starters to injury, and in Week 5 the Niners were crushed 40–8 by the Eagles. Following the Eagles game, a poll conducted on local sports radio station KNBR showed that an overwhelming majority of 49er fans wanted head coach George Seifert fired.

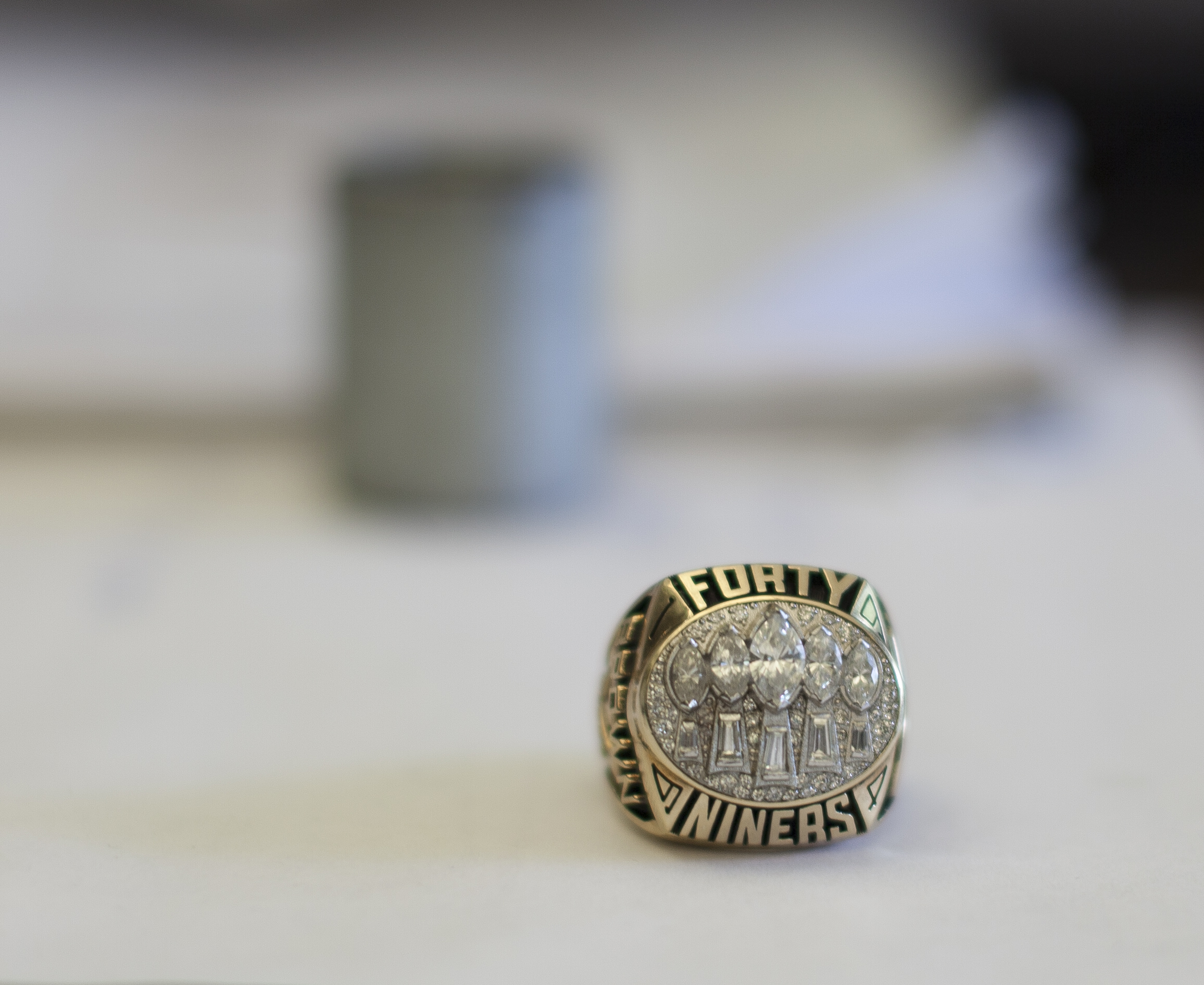
A 49ers Super Bowl ring for Super Bowl XXIX.

The game against the Eagles was a turning point for the 49ers despite being a lopsided loss. Steve Young was benched for Elvis Grbac abruptly during a series in the 3rd quarter. Soon after, Young was livid on the sidelines, shouting profanities at head coach George Seifert. Young later admitted "I was looking for a fistfight," and would later say that this incident caused his teammates to respond better to his leadership, as they saw how much he cared about winning ("It galvanized the guys behind Steve," said Brent Jones).

The following week in Detroit, the 49ers trailed the Lions 7–0. After throwing a pass, Young was hit, picked up, and driven into the ground by three Lions defenders. After the hit, Young was screaming with his face dark red in color. He crawled most of the way off of the field before refusing help from the trainers as he limped the remaining way off the field. He miraculously returned to the field two plays later (NFL rules state that after trainers attend to an injured player, that player must leave the field for at least one play (Elvis Grbac came in for that one play and threw an incompletion) to lead the 49ers to a 27–21 victory.

The team rallied around Young to win 10 straight games, including a 21–14 victory over the two-time defending Super Bowl champion Cowboys. During that span, the 49ers' average margin of victory was nearly 20 points per game; they broke 35+ points scored eleven times, breaking 40 points four of those times.

=== Throwback uniforms ===
During the 1994 season, many NFL teams wore "throwback uniforms" for occasional games (after Week 2 of the season) to celebrate the NFL's 75th anniversary (a corresponding diamond 75th Anniversary patch was also worn by all teams). The 49ers chose to wear a version of their 1955 uniforms as throwbacks. This design featured sans-serif block numerals that were outlined and shadowed in black. White pants with thinner red-black-red striping were also worn, along with the old striped red socks (the team later reverted to their regular solid red socks after receiving permission from the NFL to wear the uniforms starting from Week 10 until Super Bowl XXIX). The team's regular 1989–95 gold helmet was worn with this uniform, as there was no logo on the 1955 helmet.

The team first donned the 1955 throwback uniforms during a week 3 match against the Los Angeles Rams and the following week at home versus the Saints. Both games ended in victory (coincidentally, these were also the first two games Deion Sanders played with the 49ers after signing as a free-agent after week 2). The team then suffered an embarrassing 40–8 loss to the Philadelphia Eagles at home wearing their regular red uniforms with gold pants. (Football statistics site Football Outsiders calculates this 49ers loss to be the second-most lopsided football game they'd tracked from 1994 to 2008.)

For the subsequent three games until their bye week, the team again was scheduled to play games wearing the throwback uniforms with white pants and blockshadow numerals, and all three games resulted in wins. During the following weeks the 49ers embarked on a 10-game winning streak. The team, prompted both by the superstition of coach George Seifert, and the preference of players, petitioned the NFL to wear the throwback uniforms for the rest of the season. The league granted the request and the switch to solid red socks after the bye week marked this occurrence. In all, the team went 15–1 (including the playoffs) wearing the 1955/1994 throwback uniforms. The only loss occurred during the regular season finale at Minnesota, with the team wearing white jerseys and resting most of their starters for the playoffs. Meanwhile, the 49ers went undefeated wearing the red jerseys of the throwback uniform. After winning Super Bowl XXIX however, the team was compelled to revert to wearing its regular 1964-style uniforms (1991 revised design) for the following 1995 season. One year later, the throwback design strongly influenced the 49ers to redesign their uniform set. In 1996, the team revealed a new helmet and uniform design featuring a darker red, shadowed numbers, black accents, and white pants. In 1998, the team changed the pants to a gold color and wore these uniforms through the 2008 season. The 49ers brought back the 1994 white throwback uniform design as an alternate set for the 2018 season. The 1994 red throwback jerseys were brought back by the team as an alternate uniform for the 2021 season, the 49ers franchise's 75th anniversary.

=== Schedule ===
Week	Date	Opponent	Result	Record	Venue	Recap
1	September 5	Los Angeles Raiders	**W** 44–14	1–0	Candlestick Park	Recap
2	September 11	at Kansas City Chiefs	**L** 17–24	1–1	Arrowhead Stadium	Recap
3	September 18	at **Los Angeles Rams**	**W** 34–19	2–1	Anaheim Stadium	Recap
4	September 25	**New Orleans Saints**	**W** 24–13	3–1	Candlestick Park	Recap
5	October 2	Philadelphia Eagles	**L** 8–40	3–2	Candlestick Park	Recap
6	October 9	at Detroit Lions	**W** 27–21	4–2	Pontiac Silverdome	Recap
7	October 16	at **Atlanta Falcons**	**W** 42–3	5–2	Georgia Dome	Recap
8	October 23	Tampa Bay Buccaneers	**W** 41–16	6–2	Candlestick Park	Recap
9	Bye					
10	November 6	at Washington Redskins	**W** 37–22	7–2	Robert F. Kennedy Memorial Stadium	Recap
11	November 13	Dallas Cowboys	**W** 21–14	8–2	Candlestick Park	Recap
12	November 20	**Los Angeles Rams**	**W** 31–27	9–2	Candlestick Park	Recap
13	November 28	at **New Orleans Saints**	**W** 35–14	10–2	Louisiana Superdome	Recap
14	December 4	**Atlanta Falcons**	**W** 50–14	11–2	Candlestick Park	Recap
15	December 11	at San Diego Chargers	**W** 38–15	12–2	Jack Murphy Stadium	Recap
16	December 17	Denver Broncos	**W** 42–19	13–2	Candlestick Park	Recap
17	December 26	at Minnesota Vikings	**L** 14–21	13–3	Hubert H. Humphrey Metrodome	Recap
Note: Intra-division opponents are in **bold** text.

=== Game summaries ===
==== Week 1 vs. Los Angeles Raiders ====
Week One: Los Angeles Raiders at San Francisco 49ers – Game summary

Quarter	1	2	3	4	Total
Raiders	0	14	0	0	**14**
**49ers**	14	9	0	21	**44**

at Candlestick Park, San Francisco, California

- Date: September 5
- Game time: 6:00 p.m. PDT
- Game weather: 63 °F (17 °C); (Clear) wind 14
- Game attendance: 68,032
- Referee: Red Cashion
- TV announcers (ABC): Al Michaels (play-by-play), Dan Dierdorf and Frank Gifford (color commentators), Lynn Swann (sideline reporter)
- Pro-Football-Reference.com

Game information

**First quarter**

- SF – Jerry Rice 69-yard pass from Steve Young – (Doug Brien kick) **49ers 7–0**
- SF – Brent Jones 15-yard pass from Steve Young – (Doug Brien kick) **49ers 14–0**

**Second quarter**

- Raiders – Tim Brown 7-yard pass from Jeff Hostetler – (Jeff Jaeger kick) **49ers 14–7**
- SF – Ricky Watters 1 yard rush – (kick failed) **49ers 20–7**
- Raiders – Napoleon McCallum 1 yard rush – (Jeff Jaeger kick) **49ers 20–14**
- SF – Doug Brien 33-yard field goal – **49ers 23–14**

**Third quarter**

- No scoring plays

**Fourth quarter**

- SF – Brent Jones 8-yard pass from Steve Young – (Doug Brien kick) **49ers 30–14**
- SF – Jerry Rice 23-yard rush – (Doug Brien kick) **49ers 37–14**
- SF – Jerry Rice 38-yard pass from Steve Young – (Doug Brien kick) **49ers 44–14**

**Top passers**

- Raiders - Jeff Hostetler, 17-28-168 yards 1 touchdown 1 interception, 74.7 passer rating
- SF - Steve Young, 19-32-308 yards, 4 touchdowns 1 interception, 118.2 passer rating

**Top rushers**

- Raiders -
- SF -

**Top receivers**

- Raiders -
- SF -

**Top tacklers**

- Raiders -
- SF -

**Turnovers**

- Raiders – 2
- SF – 1

The Niners led wire to wire as Steve Young opened with two touchdowns. Jerry Rice’s third score set an NFL record for career touchdowns.

==== Week 2 at Kansas City Chiefs ====
Week Two: San Francisco 49ers at Kansas City Chiefs – Game summary

Quarter	1	2	3	4	Total
49ers	0	14	0	3	**17**
**Chiefs**	7	2	15	0	**24**

at Arrowhead Stadium, Kansas City, Missouri

- Date: September 11
- Game time: 10:00 a.m. PDT
- Game weather: 73 °F (23 °C); (Clear) wind 12
- Game attendance: 79,907
- Referee: Bob McElwee
- TV announcers (Fox): Pat Summerall (play-by-play), John Madden (color commentator), Anthony Muñoz (sideline reporter)
- Pro-Football-Reference.com

Game information

**First quarter**

- KC – Joe Valerio 1 yard pass from Joe Montana – (Lin Elliott kick) **Chiefs 7–0**

**Second quarter**

- SF – Brent Jones 5-yard pass from Steve Young – (Doug Brien kick) **Tied 7–7**
- SF – Marc Logan 1 yard rush – (Doug Brien kick) **49ers 14–7**
- KC – Safety, Derrick Thomas tackled Steve Young in end zone – **49ers 14–9**

**Third quarter**

- KC – Keith Cash 8-yard pass from Joe Montana – (J. J. Birden pass from Joe Montana) **Chiefs 17–14**
- KC – Marcus Allen 4-yard rush – (Lin Elliott kick) **Chiefs 24–14**

**Fourth quarter**

- SF – Doug Brien 19-yard field goal – **Chiefs 24–17**

**Top passers**

- SF -
- KC -

**Top rushers**

- SF -
- KC -

**Top receivers**

- SF -
- KC -

**Top tacklers**

- SF -
- KC -

**Turnovers**

- SF – 4
- KC – 0

This was the much-hyped match between Steve Young and Joe Montana, Young's predecessor as the 49ers' quarterback. Montana threw two touchdowns and a two-point conversion. Young clawed the Niners to a 14–7 lead but was then sacked for a safety; the Niners also fumbled twice while Young threw two picks. San Francisco sports bars airing the game saw viewers overwhelmingly cheer for Montana's Chiefs over Young and the Niners.

==== Week 3 at Los Angeles Rams ====
Week Three: San Francisco 49ers at Los Angeles Rams – Game summary

Quarter	1	2	3	4	Total
**49ers**	10	7	3	14	**34**
Rams	7	3	0	9	**19**

at Anaheim Stadium, Anaheim, California

- Date: September 18
- Game time: 1:00 p.m. PDT
- Game weather: 67 °F (19 °C); (Cloudy) wind 8
- Game attendance: 56,479
- Referee: Dick Hantak
- TV announcers (Fox): Joe Buck (play-by-play), Tim Green (color commentator)
- Pro-Football-Reference.com

Game information

**First quarter**

- SF – John Taylor 3-yard pass from Steve Young – (Doug Brien kick) **49ers 7–0**
- Rams – Troy Drayton 4-yard pass from Chris Miller – (Tony Zendejas kick) **Tied 7 –7**
- SF – Doug Brien 33-yard field goal – **49ers 10–7**

**Second quarter**

- Rams – Tony Zendejas 25-yard field goal – **Tied 10–10**
- SF – Steve Young 1 yard rush – (Doug Brien kick) **49ers 17–10**

**Third quarter**

- SF – Doug Brien 47-yard field goal – **49ers 20–10**

**Fourth quarter**

- SF – Jerry Rice 1 yard pass from Steve Young – (Doug Brien kick) **49ers 27–10**
- Rams – Tony Zendejas 35-yard field goal – **49ers 27–13**
- SF – Steve Young 1 yard rush – (Doug Brien kick) **49ers 34–13**
- Rams – Jerome Bettis 2-yard rush – (pass failed) **49ers 34–19**

**Top passers**

- SF -
- Rams -

**Top rushers**

- SF -
- Rams -

**Top receivers**

- SF -
- Rams -

**Top tacklers**

- SF -
- Rams -

**Turnovers**

- SF – 1
- Rams – 1

This became the final game between the 49ers and Rams in Los Angeles until 2016.

==== Week 4 vs. New Orleans Saints ====
Week Four: New Orleans Saints at San Francisco 49ers – Game summary

Quarter	1	2	3	4	Total
Saints	3	10	0	0	**13**
**49ers**	3	7	7	7	**24**

at Candlestick Park, San Francisco, California

- Date: September 25
- Game time: 1:00 p.m. PDT
- Game weather: 65 °F (18 °C); (Sunny) wind 10
- Game attendance: 63,971
- Referee: Ron Blum
- TV announcers (Fox): Pat Summerall (play-by-play), John Madden (color commentator)
- Pro-Football-Reference.com

Game information

**First quarter**

- SF – Doug Brien 43-yard field goal – **49ers 3–0**
- NO – Morten Andersen 22-yard field goal – **Tied 3–3**

**Second quarter**

- SF – Jerry Rice 28-yard pass from Steve Young – (Doug Brien kick) **49ers 10–3**
- NO – Irv Smith 17-yard pass from Jim Everett – (Morten Andersen kick) **Tied 10–10**
- NO – Morten Andersen 26-yard field goal – **Saints 13–10**

**Third quarter**

- SF – Jerry Rice 6-yard pass from Steve Young – (Doug Brien kick) **49ers 17–13**

**Fourth quarter**

- SF – Deion Sanders 74-yard interception return – (Doug Brien kick) **49ers 24–13**

**Top passers**

- NO -
- SF -

**Top rushers**

- NO -
- SF -

**Top receivers**

- NO -
- SF -

**Top tacklers**

- NO -
- SF -

**Turnovers**

- NO – 2
- SF – 2

==== Week 5 vs. Philadelphia Eagles ====
Week Five: Philadelphia Eagles at San Francisco 49ers – Game summary

Quarter	1	2	3	4	Total
**Eagles**	14	16	3	7	**40**
49ers	0	8	0	0	**8**

at Candlestick Park, San Francisco, California

- Date: October 2
- Game time: 1:00 p.m. PDT
- Game weather: 60 °F (16 °C); (Sunny) wind 14
- Game attendance: 64,843
- Referee: Jerry Markbreit
- TV announcers (Fox): Pat Summerall (play-by-play), John Madden (color commentator)
- Pro-Football-Reference.com

Game information

**First quarter**

- PHI – Charlie Garner 1 yard rush – (Eddie Murray kick) **Eagles 7–0**
- PHI – Charlie Garner 28-yard rush – (Eddie Murray kick) **Eagles 14–0**

**Second quarter**

- PHI – Safety, William Fuller tackled Steve Young in end zone – **Eagles 16–0**
- PHI – Victor Bailey 28-yard pass from Randall Cunningham – (Eddie Murray kick) **Eagles 23–0**
- SF – Steve Young 1 yard rush – (Brent Jones pass from Steve Young) **Eagles 23–8**
- PHI – Herschel Walker 2-yard rush – (Eddie Murray kick) **Eagles 30–8**

**Third quarter**

- PHI – Eddie Murray 36-yard field goal – **Eagles 33–8**

**Fourth quarter**

- PHI – Mark Bavaro 18-yard pass from Randall Cunningham – (Eddie Murray kick) **Eagles 40–8**

**Top passers**

- PHI -
- SF -

**Top rushers**

- PHI -
- SF -

**Top receivers**

- PHI -
- SF -

**Top tacklers**

- PHI -
- SF -

**Turnovers**

- PHI – 0
- SF – 3

Steve Young was benched after going 11 of 23 with two interceptions and getting sacked for a safety by William Fuller; Elvis Grbac completed four of eight passes and was sacked twice. The Eagles outgained the Niners in yardage 437 to 189. This was the second worst loss by an eventual Super Bowl champion in NFL history.

==== Week 6 at Detroit Lions ====
Week Six: San Francisco 49ers at Detroit Lions – Game summary

Quarter	1	2	3	4	Total
**49ers**	0	14	7	6	**27**
Lions	7	7	0	7	**21**

at Pontiac Silverdome, Pontiac, Michigan

- Date: October 9
- Game time: 10:00 a.m. PDT
- Game weather: indoors
- Game attendance: 77,340
- Referee: Gerry Austin
- TV announcers (Fox): Dick Stockton (play-by-play), Matt Millen (color commentator), Kevin Frazier (sideline reporter)
- Pro-Football-Reference.com

Game information

**First quarter**

- DET – Brett Perriman 33-yard pass from Scott Mitchell – (Jason Hanson kick) **Lions 7–0**

**Second quarter**

- DET – Barry Sanders 9-yard rush – (Jason Hanson kick) **Lions 14–0**
- SF – William Floyd 1 yard rush – (Doug Brien kick) **Lions 14–7**
- SF – Ricky Watters 4-yard rush – (Doug Brien kick) **Tied 14–14**

**Third quarter**

- SF – William Floyd 1 yard rush – (Doug Brien kick) **49ers 21–14**

**Fourth quarter**

- SF – Nate Singleton 5-yard pass from Steve Young – (kick failed) **49ers 27–14**
- DET – Herman Moore 26-yard pass from Scott Mitchell – (Jason Hanson kick) **49ers 27–21**

**Top passers**

- SF - Young, 19-25, 152 yards, 1 TD
- DET - Mitchell, 18-27, 246 yards, 2 TD, 1 INT

**Top rushers**

- SF -
- DET -

**Top receivers**

- SF -
- DET -

**Top tacklers**

- SF -
- DET -

**Turnovers**

- SF – 0
- DET – 2

The Lions jumped to a 14–0 lead on a Brett Perriman touchdown catch and a nine-yard score from Barry Sanders. Young was knocked out for one play with a pinched nerve in his leg; he came back in despite heavy pain and rallied the Niners to 27 unanswered points.

==== Week 7 at Atlanta Falcons ====
Week Seven: San Francisco 49ers at Atlanta Falcons – Game summary

Quarter	1	2	3	4	Total
**49ers**	14	14	14	0	**42**
Falcons	0	3	0	0	**3**

at Georgia Dome, Atlanta

- Date: October 16
- Game time: 10:00 a.m. PDT
- Game weather: indoors
- Game attendance: 67,298
- Referee: Gordon McCarter
- TV announcers (Fox): Dick Stockton (play-by-play), Matt Millen (color commentator), Ron Pitts (sideline reporter)
- Pro-Football-Reference.com

Game information

**First quarter**

- SF – Ricky Watters 10-yard pass from Steve Young – (Doug Brien kick) **49ers 7–0**
- SF – Tim McDonald 49-yard fumble return – (Doug Brien kick) **49ers 14–0**

**Second quarter**

- SF – Jerry Rice 1 yard pass from Steve Young – (Doug Brien kick) **49ers 21–0**
- ATL – Norm Johnson 34-yard field goal – **49ers 21–3**
- SF – Deion Sanders 93-yard interception return – (Doug Brien kick) **49ers 28–3**

**Third quarter**

- SF – Brent Jones 7-yard pass from Steve Young – (Doug Brien kick) **49ers 35–3**
- SF – Ricky Watters 4-yard pass from Steve Young – (Doug Brien kick) **49ers 42–3**

**Fourth quarter**

- No scoring plays

**Top passers**

- SF -
- ATL -

**Top rushers**

- SF -
- ATL -

**Top receivers**

- SF -
- ATL -

**Top tacklers**

- SF -
- ATL -

Turnovers

- SF – 0
- ATL – 6

Ex-Falcon Deion Sanders returned to the Georgia Dome and ran back a 93-yard interception for a touchdown. Steve Young threw four touchdowns while Jeff George threw four interceptions; it was the second six-turnover game for the Falcons that season.

==== Week 8 vs. Tampa Bay Buccaneers ====
Week Eight: Tampa Bay Buccaneers at San Francisco 49ers – Game summary

Quarter	1	2	3	4	Total
Buccaneers	0	0	0	16	**16**
**49ers**	7	10	17	7	**41**

at Candlestick Park, San Francisco, California

- Date: October 23
- Game time: 1:00 p.m. PDT
- Game weather: 60 °F (16 °C); (Cloudy) wind 8
- Game attendance: 62,741
- Referee: Howard Roe
- TV announcers (Fox): Kenny Albert (play-by-play), Ron Pitts (color commentator)
- Pro-Football-Reference.com

Game information

**First quarter**

- SF – Ricky Watters 13-yard rush – (Doug Brien kick) **49ers 7–0**

**Second quarter**

- SF – Doug Brien 23-yard field goal – **49ers 10–0**
- SF – Ed McCaffrey 7-yard pass from Steve Young – (Doug Brien kick) **49ers 17–0**

**Third quarter**

- SF – William Floyd 1 yard rush – (Doug Brien kick) **49ers 24–0**
- SF – Doug Brien 35-yard field goal – **49ers 27–0**
- SF – Ricky Watters 2-yard rush – (Doug Brien kick) **49ers 34–0**

**Fourth quarter**

- TB – Errict Rhett 1 yard run – (Horace Copeland pass from Craig Erickson) **49ers 34–8**
- SF – Marc Logan 1 yard pass from Elvis Grbac – (Doug Brien kick) **49ers 41–8**
- TB – Lawrence Dawsey 34-yard pass from Craig Erickson – (Jackie Harris pass from Craig Erickson) **49ers 41–16**

**Top passers**

- TB -
- SF -

**Top rushers**

- TB -
- SF -

**Top receivers**

- TB -
- SF -

**Top tacklers**

- TB -
- SF -

**Turnovers**

- TB – 1
- SF – 1

Facing the team with which he entered the NFL, Steve Young completed twenty passes for 255 yards and one score. Ricky Watters and William Floyd rushed for a combined three more touchdowns. In contrast Trent Dilfer completed just seven passes and was benched.

==== Week 9: Bye ====
The 1994 San Francisco 49ers season had a bye week, as did all of the NFC West. The team was granted permission from the NFL to wear throwback uniforms for the remainder of the season.

==== Week 10 at Washington Redskins ====
Week Ten: San Francisco 49ers at Washington Redskins – Game summary

Quarter	1	2	3	4	Total
**49ers**	10	7	13	7	**37**
Redskins	0	3	3	16	**22**

at RFK Stadium, Washington, D.C.

- Date: November 6
- Game time: 10:00 a.m. PST
- Game weather: 67 °F (19 °C); (Sunny) wind 15
- Game attendance: 54,335
- Referee: Gerry Austin
- TV announcers (Fox): Pat Summerall (play-by-play), John Madden (color commentator)
- Pro-Football-Reference.com

Game information

**First quarter**

- SF – Doug Brien 32-yard field goal – **49ers 3–0**
- SF – Brent Jones 69-yard pass from Steve Young – (Doug Brien kick) **49ers 10–0**

**Second quarter**

- WSH – Chip Lohmiller 22-yard field goal – **49ers 10–3**
- SF – Steve Young 1 yard rush – (Doug Brien kick) **49ers 17–3**

**Third quarter**

- SF – Tim McDonald 73-yard interception return – (Doug Brien kick) **49ers 24–3**
- WSH – Chip Lohmiller 23-yard field goal – **49ers 24–6**
- SF – Dexter Carter 96-yard kickoff return – (kick failed) **49ers 30–6**

**Fourth quarter**

- SF – Jerry Rice 28-yard rush – (Doug Brien kick) **49ers 37–6**
- WSH – Ethan Horton 4-yard pass from John Friesz – (Brian Mitchell run) **49ers 37–14**
- WSH – Darryl Morrison 32-yard fumble return – (Tydus Winans pass from John Friesz) **49ers 37–22**

**Top passers**

- SF -
- WSH -

**Top rushers**

- SF -
- WSH -

**Top receivers**

- SF -
- WSH -

**Top tacklers**

- SF -
- WSH -

**Turnovers**

- SF – 2
- WSH – 3

==== Week 11 vs. Dallas Cowboys ====
Week Eleven: Dallas Cowboys at San Francisco 49ers – Game summary

Quarter	1	2	3	4	Total
Cowboys	7	0	0	7	**14**
**49ers**	0	7	7	7	**21**

at Candlestick Park, San Francisco, California

- Date: November 13
- Game time: 1:00 p.m. PST
- Game weather: 57 °F (14 °C); (Sunny) wind 8
- Game attendance: 69,014
- Referee: Bernie Kukar
- TV announcers (Fox): Pat Summerall (play-by-play), John Madden (color commentator)
- Pro-Football-Reference.com

Game information

**First quarter**

- DAL – Emmitt Smith 4-yard rush (Chris Boniol kick) **Cowboys 7–0**

**Second quarter**

- SF – Steve Young 1 yard rush (Doug O'Brien kick) **Tied 7–7**

**Third quarter**

- SF – Jerry Rice 57-yard pass from Steve Young (Doug O'Brien kick) **49ers 14–7**

**Fourth quarter**

- SF – Brent Jones 13-yard pass from Steve Young (Doug O'Brien kick) **49ers 21–7**
- DAL – Emmitt Smith 2-yard rush (Chris Boniol kick) **49ers 21–14**

**Top passers**

- DAL – Troy Aikman, 23/42, 336 yards, 3 Ints
- SF – Steve Young, 12/21, 183 yards, 2 TDs

**Top rushers**

- DAL -
- SF -

**Top receivers**

- DAL -
- SF -

**Top tacklers**

- DAL -
- SF -

**Turnovers**

- DAL – 3
- SF – 0

The 49ers posted their first win over the Cowboys since 1990. The game was tied 7–7 until the Niners scored in the final three minutes of the third quarter on a 57-yard Jerry Rice touchdown catch. Following an exchange of four consecutive punts, Troy Aikman was intercepted by Merton Hanks; the ensuing Niners drive took fifteen plays and ended on a Brent Jones touchdown catch just before the two-minute warning. A very late Cowboys touchdown was followed by an unsuccessful onside kick and Niners win.

==== Week 12 vs. Los Angeles Rams ====
Week Twelve: Los Angeles Rams at San Francisco 49ers – Game summary

Quarter	1	2	3	4	Total
Rams	3	3	13	8	**27**
**49ers**	14	7	3	7	**31**

at Candlestick Park, San Francisco, California

- Date: November 20
- Game time: 5:00 p.m. PST
- Game weather: 46 °F (8 °C); (Cloudy) wind 5
- Game attendance: 62,744
- Referee: Red Cashion
- TV announcers (ESPN): Mike Patrick (play-by-play), Joe Theismann (color commentator), Mark Malone (sideline reporter)
- Pro-Football-Reference.com

Game information

**First quarter**

- SF – John Taylor 7-yard pass from Steve Young (Doug O'Brien kick) **49ers 7–0**
- Rams – Tony Zendejas 31-yard field goal – **49ers 7–3**
- SF – Jerry Rice 7-yard pass from Steve Young (Doug O'Brien kick) **49ers 14–3**

**Second quarter**

- Rams – Tony Zendejas 27-yard field goal – **49ers 14–6**
- SF – Jerry Rice 5-yard pass from Steve Young (Doug O'Brien kick) **49ers 21–6**

**Third quarter**

- Rams – Todd Knichen 44-yard rush – (pass failed) **49ers 21–12**
- SF – Doug Brien 28-yard field goal – **49ers 24–12**
- Rams – Flipper Anderson 50-yard pass from Chris Miller – (Tony Zendejas kick) **49ers 24–19**

**Fourth quarter**

- Rams – Jessie Hester 22-yard pass from Chris Miller – (Jerome Bettis run) **Rams 27–24**
- SF – Jerry Rice 18-yard pass from Steve Young (Doug O'Brien kick) **49ers 31–27**

**Top passers**

- Rams -
- SF -

**Top rushers**

- Rams -
- SF -

**Top receivers**

- Rams -
- SF -

**Top tacklers**

- Rams -
- SF -

**Turnovers**

- Rams – 0
- SF – 1

In their last home meeting with the Rams as a Los Angeles team until 2016, the Niners blew a 21–6 lead and trailed 27–24; Jerry Rice fumbled with 6:05 to go but the Rams had to punt. Steve Young threw on seven of the next ten plays and connected with Rice for the go-ahead score with 1:56 to go; the Rams failed on 4th and 20 and the Niners were winners.

==== Week 13 at New Orleans Saints ====
Week Thirteen: San Francisco 49ers at New Orleans Saints – Game summary

Quarter	1	2	3	4	Total
**49ers**	10	10	8	7	**35**
Saints	0	14	0	0	**14**

at Louisiana Superdome, New Orleans

- Date: November 28
- Game time: 6:00 p.m. PST
- Game weather: indoors
- Game attendance: 61,304
- Referee: Gordon McCarter
- TV announcers (ABC): Al Michaels (play-by-play), Dan Dierdorf and Frank Gifford (color commentators), Lynn Swann (sideline reporter)
- Pro-Football-Reference.com

Game information

**First quarter**

- SF – Doug Brien 40-yard field goal – **49ers 3–0**
- SF – Brent Jones 4-yard pass from Steve Young – (Doug Brien kick) **49ers 10–0**

**Second quarter**

- NO – Mario Bates 3-yard rush – (Morten Andersen kick) **49ers 10–7**
- SF – John Taylor 4-yard pass from Steve Young – (Doug Brien kick) **49ers 17–7**
- NO – Tyrone Hughes 86-yard fumble return – (Morten Andersen kick) **49ers 17–14**
- SF – Doug Brien 48-yard field goal – **49ers 20–14**

**Third quarter**

- SF – Brent Jones 6-yard pass from Steve Young – (Jerry Rice pass from Steve Young) **49ers 28–14**

**Fourth quarter**

- SF – Nate Singleton 42-yard pass from Steve Young – (Doug Brien kick) **49ers 35–14**

**Top passers**

- SF -
- NO -

**Top rushers**

- SF -
- NO -

**Top receivers**

- SF -
- NO -

**Top tacklers**

- SF -
- NO -

**Turnovers**

- SF – 2
- NO – 3

==== Week 14 vs. Atlanta Falcons ====
Week Fourteen: Atlanta Falcons at San Francisco 49ers – Game summary

Quarter	1	2	3	4	Total
Falcons	7	7	0	0	**14**
**49ers**	3	24	7	16	**50**

at Candlestick Park, San Francisco, California

- Date: December 4
- Game time: 1:00 p.m. PST
- Game weather: 51 °F (11 °C); (Light Rain) wind 14
- Game attendance: 69,014
- Referee: Dick Hantak
- TV announcers (Fox): Pat Summerall (play-by-play), John Madden (color commentator)
- Pro-Football-Reference.com

Game information

**First quarter**

- SF – Doug Brien 24-yard field goal – **49ers 3–0**
- ATL – Bert Emanuel 11-yard pass from Jeff George – (Norm Johnson kick) **Falcons 7–3**

**Second quarter**

- SF – John Taylor 12-yard pass from Steve Young – (Doug Brien kick) **49ers 10–7**
- SF – Steve Young 1 yard rush – (Doug Brien kick) **49ers 17–7**
- ATL – Chuck Smith 36-yard interception return – (Norm Johnson kick) **49ers 17–14**
- SF – Ricky Watters 2-yard pass from Steve Young – (Doug Brien kick) **49ers 24–14**
- SF – Doug Brien 36-yard field goal – **49ers 27–14**

**Third quarter**

- SF – Steve Young 7-yard rush – (Doug Brien kick) **49ers 34–14**

**Fourth quarter**

- SF – Jerry Rice 9-yard pass from Steve Young – (run failed) **49ers 40–14**
- SF – Doug Brien 32-yard field goal – **49ers 43–14**
- SF – Adam Walker 2-yard rush – (Doug Brien kick) **49ers 50–14**

**Top passers**

- ATL -
- SF -

**Top rushers**

- ATL -
- SF -

**Top receivers**

- ATL -
- SF -

**Top tacklers**

- ATL -
- SF -

**Turnovers**

- ATL – 5
- SF – 1

==== Week 15 at San Diego Chargers ====
Week Fifteen: San Francisco 49ers at San Diego Chargers – Game summary

Quarter	1	2	3	4	Total
**49ers**	7	14	3	14	**38**
Chargers	0	3	6	6	**15**

at Jack Murphy Stadium, San Diego

- Date: December 11
- Game time: 1:00 p.m. PST
- Game weather: 54 °F (12 °C); (Sunny) wind 7
- Game attendance: 62,105
- Referee: Tom White
- TV announcers (Fox): Pat Summerall (play-by-play), John Madden (color commentator)
- Pro-Football-Reference.com

Game information

**First quarter**

- SF – Brent Jones 10-yard pass from Steve Young – (Doug Brien kick) **49ers 7–0**

**Second quarter**

- SF – John Taylor 4-yard pass from Steve Young – (Doug Brien kick) **49ers 14–0**
- SF – Ricky Watters 4-yard rush – (Doug Brien kick) **49ers 21–0**
- SD – John Carney 50-yard field goal – **49ers 21–3**

**Third quarter**

- SD – Natrone Means 12-yard rush – (run failed) **49ers 21–9**
- SF – Doug Brien 22-yard field goal – **49ers 24–9**

**Fourth quarter**

- SF – William Floyd 1 yard rush – (Doug Brien kick) **49ers 31–9**
- SD – Tony Martin 2-yard pass from Stan Humphries – (run failed) **49ers 31–15**
- SF – Deion Sanders 90-yard interception return – (Doug Brien kick) **49ers 38–15**

**Top passers**

- SF -
- SD -

**Top rushers**

- SF -
- SD -

**Top receivers**

- SF -
- SD -

**Top tacklers**

- SF -
- SD -

**Turnovers**

- SF – 1
- SD – 2

In the preview to Super Bowl XXIX, Steve Young threw two touchdown passes and Deion Sanders recorded a pick six as the 49ers never trailed.

==== Week 16 vs. Denver Broncos ====
Week Sixteen: Denver Broncos at San Francisco 49ers – Game summary

Quarter	1	2	3	4	Total
Broncos	0	6	13	0	**19**
**49ers**	14	14	14	0	**42**

at Candlestick Park, San Francisco, California

- Date: December 17 (Sat)
- Game time: 1:00 p.m. PST
- Game weather: 47 °F (8 °C); (Cloudy), wind 8
- Game attendance: 64,844
- Referee: Johnny Grier
- TV announcers (NBC): Dick Enberg (play-by-play), Bob Trumpy (color commentator), Jim Gray (sideline reporter)
- Pro-Football-Reference.com

Game information

**First quarter**

- SF – Ricky Watters 12-yard pass from Steve Young – (Doug Brien kick) **49ers 7–0**
- SF – Jerry Rice 23-yard pass from Steve Young – (Doug Brien kick) **49ers 14–0**

**Second quarter**

- SF – William Floyd 11-yard rush – (Doug Brien kick) **49ers 21–0**
- DEN – Jason Elam 28-yard field goal – **49ers 21–3**
- SF – William Floyd 1 yard rush – (Doug Brien kick) **49ers 28–3**
- DEN – Jason Elam 45-yard field goal – **49ers 28–6**

**Third quarter**

- DEN – Glyn Milburn 11-yard rush – (Jason Elam kick) **49ers 28–13**
- SF – Ricky Watters 9-yard rush – (Doug Brien kick) **49ers 35–13**
- DEN – Derrick Clark 1 yard rush – (run failed) **49ers 35–19**
- SF – Ricky Watters 65-yard pass from Steve Young – (Doug Brien kick) **49ers 42–19**

**Fourth quarter**

- No scoring plays

**Top passers**

- DEN -
- SF -

**Top rushers**

- DEN -
- SF -

**Top receivers**

- DEN -
- SF -

**Top tacklers**

- DEN -
- SF -

**Turnovers**

- DEN – 3
- SF – 1

With their victory, the 49ers clinched home-field advantage throughout the NFC playoffs for the second time in three years.

==== Week 17 at Minnesota Vikings ====
Week Seventeen: San Francisco 49ers at Minnesota Vikings – Game summary

Quarter	1	2	3	4	Total
49ers	0	7	0	7	**14**
**Vikings**	7	3	11	0	**21**

at Hubert H. Humphrey Metrodome, Minneapolis, Minnesota

- Date: December 26
- Game time: 6:00 p.m. PST
- Game weather: indoors
- Game attendance: 63,326
- Referee: Ron Blum
- TV announcers (ABC): Al Michaels (play-by-play), Dan Dierdorf and Frank Gifford (color commentators), Lynn Swann (sideline reporter)
- Pro-Football-Reference.com

Game information

**First quarter**

- MIN – Dewayne Washington 17-yard fumble return – (Fuad Reveiz kick) **Vikings 7–0**

**Second quarter**

- SF – Jerry Rice 6-yard pass from Steve Young – (Doug Brien kick) **Tied 7–7**
- MIN – Fuad Reveiz 48-yard field goal – **Vikings 10–7**

**Third quarter**

- MIN – Fuad Reveiz 27-yard field goal – **Vikings 13–7**
- MIN – Terry Allen – (Terry Allen run) **Vikings 21–7**

**Fourth quarter**

- SF – Ed McCaffrey 1 yard pass from Elvis Grbac – (Doug Brien kick) **Vikings 21–14**

**Top passers**

- SF -
- MIN -

**Top rushers**

- SF -
- MIN -

**Top receivers**

- SF -
- MIN -

**Top tacklers**

- SF -
- MIN -

**Turnovers**

- SF – 4
- MIN – 2

Having secured the first playoff seed, the Niners started Steve Young and he completed all but one of thirteen passes before giving way to Elvis Grbac. Ricky Watters fumbled on San Francisco's second drive and the Vikings scored. Needing the game for the NFC Central division title, the Vikings won 21–14.

== Standings ==
NFC West
	W	L	T	PCT	PF	PA	STK
^{(1)} San Francisco 49ers	13	3	0	.813	505	296	L1
New Orleans Saints	7	9	0	.438	348	407	W1
Atlanta Falcons	7	9	0	.438	317	385	W1
Los Angeles Rams	4	12	0	.250	286	365	L7

== Playoffs ==
Round	Date	Opponent (seed)	Result	Record	Stadium	Attendance
Wild Card	First-round bye					
NFC Divisional Playoff	January 7, 1995	Chicago Bears (6)	W 44–15	1–0	Candlestick Park	64,644
NFC Championship Game	January 15, 1995	Dallas Cowboys (2)	W 38–28	2–0	Candlestick Park	69,125
Super Bowl XXIX	January 29, 1995	San Diego Chargers (A2)	W 49–26	3–0	Joe Robbie Stadium	74,107

Notes:

^{a} All times in Pacific Time Zone.

=== NFC Divisional Playoff ===
NFC Divisional Playoff: (#6) Chicago Bears at (#1) San Francisco 49ers – Game summary

Quarter	1	2	3	4	Total
Bears	3	0	0	12	15
49ers	7	23	7	7	44

at Candlestick Park, San Francisco, California

- Date: Saturday January 7, 1995
- Game time: 1:00 p.m. PST
- Game weather: 54 °F (12 °C); (rain) wind 26
- Game attendance: 64,644
- Referee: Howard Roe
- TV announcers (Fox): Dick Stockton (play-by-play), Matt Millen (color commentator), Tim Green (sideline reporter)
- Pro-Football-Reference.com

Game information

First quarter

- CHI – Kevin Butler 39-yard field goal – Bears 3–0
- SF – William Floyd 2-yard rush – (Doug Brien kick) 49ers 7–3

Second quarter

- SF – Brent Jones 8-yard pass from Steve Young (kick failed) 49ers 13–3
- SF – William Floyd 4-yard rush (Doug Brien kick) 49ers 20–3
- SF – Doug Brien 36-yard field goal 49ers 23–3
- SF – Steve Young 6-yard rush (Doug Brien kick) 49ers 30–3

Third quarter

- SF – William Floyd 1 yard rush (Doug Brien kick) 49ers 37–3

Fourth quarter

- CHI – Jim Flanigan 2-yard pass from Erik Kramer (pass failed) 49ers 37–9
- SF – Adam Walker 1 yard rush (Doug Brien kick)49ers 44–9
- CHI – Lewis Tillman 1 yard rush (pass failed) 49ers 44–15

Top passers

- CHI -
- SF -

Top rushers

- CHI -
- SF -

Top receivers

- CHI -
- SF -

Top tacklers

- CHI -
- SF -

Turnovers

- CHI – 2
- SF – 1

After a Brent Jones fumble on their first drive of the game, in which the Bears converted with a field goal by Kevin Butler, the 49ers went on to score 37 unanswered points to rout the Bears 44–15, including scoring 23 in the second quarter (Jones caught an eight-yard score in the second). The Bears would not score until the fourth quarter when the game was already out of reach. An endzone brawl erupted late in the second quarter following Steve Young's six-yard rushing score. Shaun Gayle of the Bears pushed Young to the dirt after the score; when Young threw the ball in the ground and in Gayle's face, a fight erupted.

=== NFC Championship Game ===
NFC Championship Game: (#2) Dallas Cowboys at (#1) San Francisco 49ers – Game summary

Quarter	1	2	3	4	Total
Cowboys	7	7	7	7	28
49ers	21	10	7	0	38

at Candlestick Park, San Francisco, California

- Date: January 15, 1995
- Game time: 1:00 p.m. PST
- Game weather: 51 °F (11 °C); (Light Rain) wind 13
- Game attendance: 69,125
- Referee: Dick Hantak
- TV announcers (Fox): Pat Summerall (play-by-play), John Madden (color commentator), Matt Millen (sideline reporter)
- Pro-Football-Reference.com

Game information

First quarter

- SF – Eric Davis 44-yard interception return – (Doug Brien kick) 49ers 7–0
- SF – Ricky Watters 29-yard pass from Steve Young – (Doug Brien kick) 49ers 14–0
- SF – William Floyd 1 yard rush – (Doug Brien kick) 49ers 21–0
- DAL – Michael Irvin 44-yard pass from Troy Aikman – (Chris Boniol kick) 49ers 21–7

Second quarter

- SF – Doug Brien 34-yard field goal – 49ers 24–7
- DAL – Emmitt Smith 4-yard rush – (Chris Boniol kick) 49ers 24–14
- SF – Jerry Rice 28-yard pass from Steve Young – (Doug Brien kick) 49ers 31–14

Third quarter

- DAL – Emmitt Smith 1 yard rush – (Chris Boniol kick) 49ers 31–21
- SF – Steve Young 3-yard rush – (Doug Brien kick) 49ers 38–21

Fourth quarter

- DAL – Michael Irvin 10-yard pass from Troy Aikman – (Chris Boniol kick)49ers 38–28

Top passers

- DAL - Aikman 30-53-380-2-3
- SF - Young 13-29-155-2-0

Top rushers

- DAL - Smith 20-74-2
- SF - Watters 14-72

Top receivers

- DAL - Irvin 12-192-2
- SF - Jones 3-37

Top tacklers

- DAL - R. Jones 6 total
- SF - E. Davis 8 total

Turnovers

- DAL – 5
- SF – 1

Looking to make a statement after being knocked out of the playoffs the previous two years by the Cowboys, the 49ers pounced on turnovers by the Cowboys on their first three possessions to start the game; San Francisco thus broke out to a 21–0 lead midway through the first quarter. It started with an interception by Eric Davis that was returned 44 yards for a touchdown on just the third play of the game; it was followed by a Michael Irvin fumble that set up a 29-yard screen pass by Steve Young to Ricky Watters for a touchdown, and then a fumble on the ensuing kickoff in which the 49ers converted with a one-yard touchdown run by William Floyd. The 49ers went into halftime up 31–14 after a 28-yard pass by Young to Jerry Rice. The Cowboys fought back in the 2nd half, but fell short. The 49ers eliminated the two-time defending Super Bowl champion Cowboys, 38–28, advancing to their 5th Super Bowl and ending the Cowboys’ chance of becoming the first NFL team ever to win three consecutive Super Bowl championships. The last team with a chance of winning three consecutive Super Bowls before the Cowboys were the 49ers themselves. The Cowboys turned the ball over 5 times, which ended up being a major factor in the game. The 49ers also handed Troy Aikman his first ever loss as a starting quarterback in the post season. Young's victory came ironically with almost the same passer rating (84.7) he'd had in his 1992 championship loss to Dallas (84.6). This would end up being the 49ers last win in the NFC Championship until 2012.

=== Super Bowl XXIX ===
Super Bowl XXIX: (A2) San Diego Chargers vs. (N1) San Francisco 49ers – Game summary

Quarter	1	2	3	4	Total
Chargers	7	3	8	8	26
49ers	14	14	14	7	49

at Joe Robbie Stadium, Miami

- Date: January 29, 1995
- Game time: 3:00 p.m. PST
- Game weather: 73 °F (23 °C); (Cloudy) wind 6
- Game attendance: 74,107
- Referee: Jerry Markbreit
- TV announcers (ABC): Al Michaels (play-by-play), Dan Dierdorf and Frank Gifford (color commentators), Lesley Visser and Lynn Swann (sideline reporters)
- Pro-Football-Reference.com

Game information

First quarter

- SF – Jerry Rice 44-yard pass from Steve Young – (Doug Brien kick) 49ers 7–0
- SF – Ricky Watters 51-yard pass from Steve Young – (Doug Brien kick) 49ers 14–0
- SD – Natrone Means 1 yard rush – (John Carney kick) 49ers 14–7

Second quarter

- SF – William Floyd 5-yard pass from Steve Young – (Doug Brien kick) 49ers 21–7
- SF – Ricky Watters 8-yard pass from Steve Young – (Doug Brien kick) 49ers 28–7
- SD – John Carney 31-yard field goal – 49ers 28–10

Third quarter

- SF – Ricky Watters 9-yard rush – (Doug Brien kick) 49ers 35–10
- SF – Jerry Rice 15-yard pass from Steve Young – (Doug Brien kick) 49ers 42–10
- SD – Andre Coleman 98-yard kickoff return – (*Mark Seay pass from Stan Humphries) 49ers 42–18

Fourth quarter

- SF – Jerry Rice 7-yard pass from Steve Young – (Doug Brien kick) 49ers 49–18
- SD – Tony Martin 30-yard pass from Stan Humphries – (Alfred Pupunu pass from Stan Humphries) 49ers 49–26

Top passers

- SD - Humphries 24-49-275-1-2
- SF - Young 24-36-325-6-0

Top rushers

- SD -
- SF -

Top receivers

- SD -
- SF -

Top tacklers

- SD -
- SF -

Turnovers

- SD – 3
- SF – 0

Steve Young set a Super Bowl record by throwing six touchdown passes in a game. The record had previously been held by his predecessor Joe Montana, who threw for a then-record five touchdowns in Super Bowl XXIV (ironically against one of San Diego's AFC West rivals).

(*)The Chargers became the first team to have a successful two-point conversion in the Super Bowl. This was the first season in which the NFL allowed 2-point conversions (a rule in place in the American Football League in San Diego's first ten seasons), and the Chargers actually had two in the game.

With their first Super Bowl win since 1989, the 49ers secured their 5th Super Bowl title in franchise history, which was the most by 1 team in NFL history until it was tied by the Dallas Cowboys in 1995, and has since been surpassed by the Pittsburgh Steelers & the New England Patriots who won their 6th Super Bowl's in 2008 & 2018 respectively. And as of 2025, this remains the last time the 49ers had won the Super Bowl as they have been 0-3 in the Super Bowl since.

== Media ==
=== Pre season Local TV ===
Channel	Play-by-play	Color commentator(s)
KPIX-TV		

=== Local Radio ===
Flagship station	Play-by-play	Color commentator(s)	Sideline reporter (s)
KGO–AM	Joe Starkey	Wayne Walker	

== 1995 AFC-NFC Pro Bowl ==
- Merton Hanks, FS, NFC Pro Bowlers
- Brent Jones, TE, NFC Pro Bowlers
- Tim McDonald, SS, NFC Pro Bowlers
- Bart Oates, C, NFC Pro Bowlers
- Jerry Rice, WR, NFC Pro Bowlers
- Deion Sanders, CB, NFC Pro Bowlers
- Jesse Sapolu, G, NFC Pro Bowlers
- Dana Stubblefield, DT, NFC Pro Bowlers
- Ricky Watters, RB, NFC Pro Bowlers
- Steve Young, QB, NFC Pro Bowlers

== Awards and honors ==
- Led NFL with 66 Touchdowns
- Led NFL with 505 points scored
- Jerry Rice, NFL leader, Receiving Yards (1,499)
- Jerry Rice, NFC Pro Bowl
- Deion Sanders, National Football League Defensive Player of the Year Award
- Deion Sanders, Newspaper Enterprise Association Defensive Player of the Year Award
- Deion Sanders, NFC Pro Bowl
- Bryant Young, Defensive End, UPI NFL-NFC Rookie of the Year
- Steve Young, led NFL, 35 Touchdown Passes
- Steve Young, NFL Passing Leader, 112.8 Passer Rating
- Steve Young, NFC Pro Bowl
- Steve Young, All-Pro selection
- Steve Young, Super Bowl XXIX MVP
- Steve Young, NFL MVP
- Steve Young, PFWA NFL MVP
- Steve Young, NEA NFL MVP
- Steve Young, UPI NFC Player of the Year
- Steve Young, Bert Bell Award

=== Milestones ===
- Jerry Rice, 100 reception season (Rice finished the season with 112 receptions)
- Jerry Rice, 1,000-yard receiving season
- Jerry Rice surpassed Jim Brown's all time touchdown record of 126 in Week 1, scoring three touchdowns against the Los Angeles Raiders on Monday Night Football.
