= 1996 Pro Bowl =

National Football League all-star game

1996 NFL Pro Bowl
NFC	AFC
20	13
Head coach: Mike Holmgren (Green Bay Packers)	Head coach: Ted Marchibroda (Indianapolis Colts)
	1	2	3	4	Total
NFC	3	17	0	0	20
AFC	7	0	6	0	13
- Date: February 4, 1996
- Stadium: Aloha Stadium; Honolulu, Hawaii
- MVP: Jerry Rice (San Francisco 49ers)
- Referee: Tom White
- Attendance: 50,034

TV in the United States
- Network: ABC
- Announcers: Al Michaels, Frank Gifford, Dan Dierdorf, Lynn Swann & Lesley Visser

The 1996 Pro Bowl was the NFL's all-star game for the 1995 season. The game was played on February 4, 1996, at Aloha Stadium in Honolulu, Hawaii. The final score was NFC 20, AFC 13. Jerry Rice of the San Francisco 49ers was named the game's Most Valuable Player after he had two clutch catches, including the final one which won the game. He finished with six catches for 82 yards.

The attendance for the game was 50,034. The coaches were Mike Holmgren of the Green Bay Packers and Ted Marchibroda of the Indianapolis Colts. The referee was Tom White.

== AFC roster ==
=== Offense ===
Position:	Starters:	Reserves:
Quarterback	13 Dan Marino, Miami	8 Jeff Blake, Cincinnati; 4 Jim Harbaugh, Indianapolis; 13 Steve Bono, Kansas City
Running back	42 Chris Warren, Seattle	28 Marshall Faulk, Indianapolis; 28 Curtis Martin, New England
Fullback	38 Kimble Anders, Kansas City	
Wide receiver	81 Carl Pickens, Cincinnati; 81 Tim Brown, Oakland	83 Anthony Miller, Denver; 82 Yancey Thigpen, Pittsburgh
Tight end	87 Ben Coates, New England	84 Shannon Sharpe, Denver
Offensive tackle	78 Richmond Webb, Miami; 78 Bruce Armstrong, New England	65 Gary Zimmerman, Denver; 67 Will Wolford, Indianapolis
Offensive guard	74 Bruce Matthews, Houston; 76 Steve Wisniewski, Oakland	68 Will Shields, Kansas City; 69 Keith Sims, Miami
Center	63 Dermontti Dawson, Pittsburgh	53 Mark Stepnoski, Houston

=== Defense ===
Position:	Starters:	Reserves:
Defensive end	78 Bruce Smith, Buffalo; 90 Neil Smith, Kansas City	91 Leslie O'Neal, San Diego
Defensive tackle	97 Dan Saleaumua, Kansas City; 91 Chester McGlockton, Oakland	96 Cortez Kennedy, Seattle
Outside linebacker	95 Bryce Paup, Buffalo; 55 Junior Seau, San Diego	58 Derrick Thomas, Kansas City; 95 Greg Lloyd, Pittsburgh
Inside linebacker	51 Bryan Cox, Miami	
Cornerback	37 Carnell Lake, Pittsburgh; 34 Dale Carter, Kansas City	36 Terry McDaniel, Oakland; 29 Darryll Lewis, Houston
Free safety	27 Steve Atwater, Denver	
Strong safety	23 Blaine Bishop, Houston	

=== Special teams ===
Position:	Player:
Punter	2 Darren Bennett, San Diego
Placekicker	1 Jason Elam, Denver
Kick returner	22 Glyn Milburn, Denver
Special teamer	89 Steve Tasker, Buffalo

== NFC roster ==
=== Offense ===
Position:	Starters:	Reserves:
Quarterback	4 Brett Favre, Green Bay	8 Troy Aikman, Dallas; 1 Warren Moon, Minnesota; 8 Steve Young, San Francisco
Running back	22 Emmitt Smith, Dallas	34 Craig Heyward, Atlanta; 20 Barry Sanders, Detroit; 32 Ricky Watters, Philadelphia
Fullback	37 Larry Centers, Arizona	
Wide receiver	84 Herman Moore, Detroit; 80 Jerry Rice, San Francisco	88 Michael Irvin, Dallas; 80 Cris Carter, Minnesota
Tight end	84 Jay Novacek, Dallas	89 Mark Chmura, Green Bay; 84 Brent Jones, San Francisco
Offensive tackle	75 Lomas Brown, Detroit; 77 Willie Roaf, New Orleans	71 Mark Tuinei, Dallas
Offensive guard	61 Nate Newton, Dallas; 64 Randall McDaniel, Minnesota	73 Larry Allen, Dallas
Center	53 Kevin Glover, Detroit	53 Ray Donaldson, Dallas; 66 Bart Oates, San Francisco

=== Defense ===
Position:	Starters:	Reserves:
Defensive end	92 Reggie White, Green Bay; 95 William Fuller, Philadelphia	56 Chris Doleman, Atlanta; 94 Charles Haley, Dallas
Defensive tackle	93 John Randle, Minnesota; 94 Dana Stubblefield, San Francisco	98 Eric Swann, Arizona
Outside linebacker	51 William Thomas, Philadelphia; 57 Ken Harvey, Washington	54 Lee Woodall, San Francisco
Inside linebacker	51 Ken Norton, Jr., San Francisco	58 Jessie Tuggle, Atlanta
Cornerback	35 Aeneas Williams, Arizona; 25 Eric Davis, San Francisco	21 Eric Allen, New Orleans
Free safety	36 Merton Hanks, San Francisco	
Strong safety	28 Darren Woodson, Dallas	46 Tim McDonald, San Francisco

=== Special teams ===
Position:	Player:
Punter	10 Jeff Feagles, Arizona
Placekicker	5 Morten Andersen, Atlanta
Kick returner	30 Brian Mitchell, Washington
Special teamer	37 Elbert Shelley, Atlanta
