= William Floyd (American football) =

American football player (born 1972)

- Floyd with the San Francisco 49ers in 1996

No. 40
- Position: Fullback

Personal information
- Born: February 17, 1972 (age 54); Jacksonville, Florida, U.S.
- Listed height: 6 ft 1 in (1.85 m)
- Listed weight: 242 lb (110 kg)

Career information
- High school: Lakewood (St. Petersburg, Florida)
- College: Florida State
- NFL draft: 1994: 1st round, 28th overall pick

Career history
- San Francisco 49ers (1994–1997); Carolina Panthers (1998–2000); Tennessee Titans (2001)*
- * Offseason or practice squad member only

Awards and highlights
- Super Bowl champion (XXIX); National champion (1993); First rookie in NFL history to score 3 touchdowns in a playoff game

Career NFL statistics
- Rushing yards: 1,141
- Rushing average: 3.2
- Rushing touchdowns: 20
- Stats at Pro Football Reference

William Ali "Bar None" Floyd (born February 17, 1972) is an American former professional football player who is a color analyst on the Seminole ISP Sports Network. He played as a fullback in the National Football League (NFL). Floyd played college football for the Florida State Seminoles.

== High school and collegiate career ==
At Lakewood High School in St. Petersburg, Florida, he compiled a 34–4 record and led the Spartans to the only undefeated regular season in school history in 1988. He earned All-Sun Coast and All-Pinellas County honors and was rated as the number one running back in the state of Florida and the number two fullback in the country by Super Prep magazine.

He enrolled at Florida State University in 1990, and helped the football team win the national championship in 1993, rushing for 321 yards and 5 touchdowns. Floyd finished his three seasons at FSU with 640 rushing yards, 293 receiving yards, and 20 touchdowns.

== Professional career ==
He was the premier fullback of the 1994 NFL draft and was selected with the 28th pick of the first round by the San Francisco 49ers. Floyd is the last fullback to be selected in the first round of the NFL draft. A brash and loud rookie but also thought to have a very bright career in front of him, he helped San Francisco win Super Bowl XXIX during his rookie year. In a 1995 divisional playoff game against the Chicago Bears, he became the first rookie to score three touchdowns in a playoff game. He also scored a touchdown in the NFC title game, assisting the 49ers to a 38–28 win over the Dallas Cowboys after 2 frustrating losses to Dallas in the previous 2 NFC Championship Games. In Super Bowl XXIX, Floyd rushed for 32 yards, caught 4 passes for 26 yards, and scored a touchdown in San Francisco's 49–26 victory.

Floyd's 1995 season was cut short in Week 9 when he tore three ligaments in his right knee on a goal-line running play that put him on the reserve list for the remainder of the season. He was leading the NFL in receptions (47) at the time of the injury.

He finished his career playing with the Carolina Panthers from 1998 through 2000. In his 7 NFL seasons, Floyd rushed for 1,141 yards, caught 191 passes for 1,427 yards, returned 1 kickoff for 22 yards, and scored 25 touchdowns (20 rushing and 5 receiving).

== NFL career statistics ==
Legend
	Won the Super Bowl
	Led the league
**Bold**	Career high

=== Regular season ===
Year	Team	Games		Rushing					Receiving				
Year	Team	GP	GS	Att	Yds	Avg	Lng	TD	Rec	Yds	Avg	Lng	TD
1994	SFO	16	11	**87**	**305**	3.5	**26**	**6**	19	145	7.6	15	0
1995	SFO	8	8	64	237	3.7	23	2	**47**	**348**	7.4	23	**1**
1996	SFO	9	8	47	186	**4.0**	12	2	26	197	7.6	24	**1**
1997	SFO	15	15	78	231	3.0	22	3	37	321	**8.7**	**44**	**1**
1998	CAR	16	13	28	71	2.5	7	3	24	123	5.1	20	**1**
1999	CAR	16	16	35	78	2.2	16	3	21	179	8.5	25	0
2000	CAR	10	8	16	33	2.1	8	1	17	114	6.7	15	**1**
		90	79	355	1,141	3.2	26	20	191	1,427	7.5	44	5

=== Playoffs ===
Year	Team	Games		Rushing					Receiving				
Year	Team	GP	GS	Att	Yds	Avg	Lng	TD	Rec	Yds	Avg	Lng	TD
1994	SFO	3	3	**26**	**77**	**3.0**	6	**4**	7	42	6.0	9	**1**
1996	SFO	2	2	10	26	2.6	6	0	**10**	**71**	**7.1**	**19**	0
1997	SFO	2	2	5	12	2.4	**10**	1	1	5	5.0	5	0
		7	7	41	115	2.8	10	5	18	118	6.6	19	1

== Personal life ==
He lives in Orlando, Florida, with his wife Bonita and their three children William, Thai and Jaden, the latter of which currently plays safety for Florida State. The family is active in his non-profit community-benefit foundation, William Floyd's Bar None Foundation (Floyd's agent proclaimed Floyd to be the best fullback in the draft, 'Bar None'. John Madden made the nickname famous by repeating it during television broadcasts).

On April 30, 2008, Florida State University and ISP Sports announced that Floyd, who helped win a national championship for the Seminoles in 1993, would join Gene Deckerhoff as color analyst on the Seminole ISP Sports Network for radio broadcasts of FSU football games. Floyd is also in his third season as a color analyst on Tailgate Overtime, airing live every Monday at 7PM on Sunshine Network during the college football season.

Floyd also rapped one verse on the track "Bay Riders" by Vallejo artist Celly Cel on the 1996 compilation album, NFL Jams. The song was later included on the Celly Cel compilation album, Song'z U Can't Find, in 2002.
