= Doug Brien =

American football player (born 1970)

No. 4, 10, 6
- Position: Placekicker

Personal information
- Born: November 24, 1970 (age 55); Bloomfield, New Jersey, U.S.
- Listed height: 5 ft 11 in (1.80 m)
- Listed weight: 190 lb (86 kg)

Career information
- High school: De La Salle (Concord, California)
- College: California
- NFL draft: 1994: 3rd round, 85th overall pick

Career history
- San Francisco 49ers (1994–1995); New Orleans Saints (1995–2000); Indianapolis Colts (2001); Tampa Bay Buccaneers (2001); Minnesota Vikings (2002); New York Jets (2003–2004); Chicago Bears (2005)

Awards and highlights
- Super Bowl champion (XXIX); First-team All-Pac-10 (1991); Second-team All-Pac-10 (1992); NFL record: Most PATs in a single postseason: 17 (1994)

Career NFL statistics
- Field goals: 207
- Field goal attempts: 258
- Field goal %: 80.2
- Longest field goal: 56
- Stats at Pro Football Reference

Douglas Robert Zachariah Brien (born November 24, 1970) is an American former professional football player who was a placekicker for 12 seasons in the National Football League (NFL). He played college football for the California Golden Bears and was selected by the San Francisco 49ers in the third round of the 1994 NFL draft. Brien played in the NFL for seven teams: San Francisco, New Orleans, Indianapolis, Tampa Bay, Minnesota, New York Jets, and Chicago. After retiring from the NFL, Brien co-founded the real estate investment firms Waypoint Homes and Mynd.

== Early life ==
Brien attended De La Salle High School in Concord, California, where he was a placekicker for the Spartans' football team his senior year.

== College career ==
At the University of California, Berkeley, he was a member of the teams that won the Citrus Bowl in 1991 and the Alamo Bowl in 1993. Off the field, he was a member of the Sigma Alpha Epsilon fraternity.

== Professional career ==
Pre-draft measurables
Height	Weight	Arm length	Hand span
5 ft 11 1/4 in (1.81 m)	177 lb (80 kg)	27 7/8 in (0.71 m)	8 in (0.20 m)

Brien was drafted in the third round (85th overall) in the 1994 NFL draft. He was the only kicker to be taken during the draft and moved across the San Francisco bay from Berkeley to join the San Francisco 49ers. Brien struggled during his rookie year, converting 15 of 20 field goals (20th of 28 qualified kickers) and 60 of 62 PATs (19th of 24 qualified kickers) for the 49ers. The 49ers, led by Steve Young, went on to win Super Bowl XXIX over the San Diego Chargers by a score of 49–26, a game in which Brien missed his only field goal attempt, a 47-yard try before halftime. Brien nonetheless set the record for most PATs during a single postseason with 17 (on 18 attempts) en route to earning a Super Bowl ring that season. Brien also had a fumble recovery during the NFC Championship game.

The following year, Brien made only 58% of his field goals for San Francisco, and was cut after missing a potential game-winning field goal against the Indianapolis Colts. He signed a few weeks later with the New Orleans Saints. Brien went on to play a total of 12 seasons in the NFL for 7 different organizations including 6 seasons with the Saints. He was elected a team captain as well as the NFLPA player rep for the Saints. Over the course of his career, Brien was regarded as one of the most reliable kickers in the league. One important exception to this was during the 2004 Divisional Playoff game in Pittsburgh against the Steelers. In this contest, Brien missed two 4th-quarter field goals from 47 and 43 yards which would have won the game for the New York Jets. The Jets cut Brien that offseason, and he finished his career the next season after missing three of four kicks for the Chicago Bears. At the time of his retirement, he was one of the 10 most accurate field goal kickers of all time, and currently ranks 72nd. During his career, Brien converted 80.2% of field goals and 98% of PATs. Brien accounted for 915 points over his 12-year career and has a career long make from 56 yards. He was also an alternate to the Pro Bowl on two occasions.
