= Tim McDonald (American football) =

American football player and coach (born 1965)

No. 46
- Position: Safety

Personal information
- Born: January 6, 1965 (age 61); Fresno, California, U.S.
- Listed height: 6 ft 2 in (1.88 m)
- Listed weight: 219 lb (99 kg)

Career information
- High school: Edison (Fresno)
- College: USC
- NFL draft: 1987: 2nd round, 34th overall pick

Career history

Playing
- St. Louis / Phoenix Cardinals (1987–1992); San Francisco 49ers (1993–1999)

Coaching
- Fresno State (2012) Defensive backs coach; New York Jets (2013–2014) Defensive backs coach; Buffalo Bills (2015–2016) Defensive backs coach

Awards and highlights
- Super Bowl champion (XXIX); 2× First-team All-Pro (1989, 1992); 4× Second-team All-Pro (1990, 1991, 1993, 1995); 6× Pro Bowl (1989, 1991–1995); Consensus All-American (1986); First-team All-American (1985); 2× First-team All-Pac-10 (1985, 1986); Second-team All-Pac-10 (1984)

Career NFL statistics
- Tackles: 1,139
- Interceptions: 40
- Interception yards: 640
- Forced fumbles: 10
- Fumble recoveries: 16
- Sacks: 9.5
- Defensive touchdowns: 5
- Stats at Pro Football Reference

Timothy McDonald (born January 6, 1965) is an American former professional football player who was a safety for 13 seasons in the National Football League (NFL). McDonald played college football for the USC Trojans, and was honored as a two-time All-American and two-time team most valuable player (MVP). A second-round pick in the 1987 NFL draft, he played for the St. Louis / Phoenix Cardinals (1987–1992) and the San Francisco 49ers (1993–1999). Upon the conclusion of his playing career, McDonald entered coaching, most recently serving as the defensive backs coach for the New York Jets and the Buffalo Bills.

== Early life ==
McDonald was born in Fresno, California. He played high school football at Edison High School in Fresno.

At Edison, McDonald was named a prep All-American, All-California, All-Northern California, all-metro and league MVP at both safety and quarterback. He completed 56.9 percent of his passes for 2,739 yards and 30 touchdowns, and also rushed for 400 yards and six touchdowns. McDonald was also credited with five INTs and 123 tackles on defense.

== College career ==
He attended the University of Southern California (USC), and majored in business administration at what is now the Marshall School of Business. As a three-year starter, he accumulated 325 tackles and 11 interceptions. He was an All-American as a junior in 1985 and a consensus All-American as a senior in 1986, and followed a prominent list of All-American safeties who attended USC, such as Dennis Thurman, Ronnie Lott, Dennis Smith, Joey Browner, Charles Phillips, Artimus Parker, Mike Battle, and Mark Carrier. McDonald is one of only six safeties named on the Walter Camp All-Century Team selected in 1999, celebrating the greatest college football players of the twentieth century. He was also a finalist as a senior for the Jim Thorpe Award and the Defensive Player of the Game in the 1987 East–West Shrine Game.

== Professional career ==
Pre-draft measurables
Height	Weight	Arm length	Hand span	40-yard dash	10-yard split	20-yard split	20-yard shuttle	Vertical jump	Broad jump	Bench press
6 ft 2 1/2 in (1.89 m)	207 lb (94 kg)	32 in (0.81 m)	8 3/4 in (0.22 m)	4.72 s	1.64 s	2.73 s	4.27 s	33.0 in (0.84 m)	10 ft 2 in (3.10 m)	6 reps
All values from NFL Combine

=== St. Louis/Phoenix Cardinals ===
The St. Louis Cardinals selected McDonald in the second round (34th pick overall) of the 1987 NFL draft. On August 2, 1987, the St. Louis Cardinals signed McDonald to a three—year, $2.25 million rookie contract.

==== 1987 season ====
On September 1, 1987, McDonald suffered a fractured left ankle during a 20—16 win at the Chicago Bears in their third preseason game. He subsequently missed the majority of the season due to a fractured ankle. On December 13, 1987, McDonald made his professional regular season debut as the Cardinals defeated the New York Giants 27—24. He finished his rookie season with seven solo tackles and two pass deflections in three games and zero starts.

==== 1988 season ====
Throughout training camp, McDonald competed against Leonard Smith for the starting role at strong safety. Head coach Gene Stallings named McDonald the primary backup safety to begin the season behind starting duo Leonard Smith and Lonnie Young. On September 12, 1988, McDonald earned his first career start and made the first interception of his career on a pass attempt thrown by Steve Pelluer during a 17—14 loss to the Dallas Cowboys. McDonald retained a starting role for the remainder of the season and cemented himself as the starting strong safety after Leonard Smith was traded to the Buffalo Bills on September 21, 1988 in return for cornerback Roland Mitchell. On December 4, 1988, McDonald set a season-high with 12 solo tackles, made one sack, and forced a fumble as the Cardinals were routed 7—44 at the New York Giants. He finished the 1988 NFL season with 115 combined tackles (101 solo), eight pass deflections, four forced fumbles, two sacks, and two interceptions in 16 games and 15 starts.

==== 1989 season ====
On September 17, 1989, McDonald recorded two combined tackles (one solo), set a career-high with five pass deflections, and sealed a 34—24 victory at the Seattle Seahawks after intercepting a pass by Dave Krieg with three seconds remaining. On November 5, 1989, McDonald recorded 10 combined tackles (eight solo), made three pass deflections, and set a season-high with two interceptions on passes by Jeff Hostetler as the Cardinals lost 20—13 to the New York Giants. In Week 10, he made five combined tackles (four solo), two pass break-ups, two interceptions, and returned an interception thrown by Troy Aikman 53—yards to score the first touchdown of his career as the Cardinals defeated the Dallas Cowboys 24—20. On November 20, 1989, the Phoenix Cardinals fired head coach Gene Stallings after they fell to a 5—6 record. They promoted running backs coach Hank Kuhlmann to interim head coach for the rest of the season. On November 26, 1989, McDonald made two combined tackles (one solo), one pass deflection, and set a career-high with his seventh interception of the season after picking off Vinny Testaverde's pass to Bruce Hill during a 14—13 loss to the Tampa Bay Buccaneers. In Week 14, he set a season-high with 16 combined tackles (13 solo) as the Cardinals lost 14—16 at the Los Angeles Raiders. He started all 16 games for the first time in his career and finished with 155 combined tackles (102 solo), 16 pass deflections, seven interceptions, one fumble recovery, and one touchdown. He was voted to the 1990 Pro Bowl, marking the first Pro Bowl selection of his career.

==== 1990 season ====
On February 6, 1990, the Phoenix Cardinals announced their decision to hire Joe Bugel to be their new head coach. On August 22, 1990, the Phoenix Cardinals re-signed McDonald to a two—year, $1.40 million contract ending a 29 day contract holdout during training camp. Defensive coordinator Joe Pascale named McDonald as the starting strong safety to begin the season and paired him with free safety Lonnie Young. On September 16, 1990, McDonald made five combined tackles (three solo), set a season-high with two pass deflections, and intercepted a pass thrown by Randall Cunningham during a 23—21 win at the Philadelphia Eagles. In Week 16, he set a season-high with 16 combined tackles (eight solo) as they lost 21—24 to the New York Giants. He started all 16 games for the second consecutive season and made 131 combined tackles (101 solo), 11 pass deflections, four interceptions, a forced fumble, and one fumble recovery.

==== 1991 season ====
The Phoenix Cardinals' new defensive coordinator Fritz Shurmur retained McDonald as the starting strong safety and paired him with free safety Mike Zordich. On September 1, 1991, McDonald started in the Cardinals' season-opener at the Los Angeles Rams, recording nine combined tackles (seven solo) and sealing their 24—14 victory by intercepting a desperation pass thrown by Jim Everett to wide receiver Flipper Anderson with 1:11 remaining in the game. On October 20, 1991, McDonald recorded five combined tackles (four solo), made two pass deflections, and set a season-high with two interceptions on pass attempts by Chris Miller as the Cardinals defeated the Atlanta Falcons 10—16. In Week 9, he set a season-high with 13 combined tackles (10 solo), made two pass deflections, and intercepted a pass attempt by Rich Gannon during a 28—0 loss to the Minnesota Vikings. On November 29, 1991, McDonald suffered a broken ankle during practice and subsequently missed the remainder of the season. He finished the season with 96 combined tackles (81 solo), 11 pass deflections, five interceptions, and a fumble recovery in 13 games and 13 starts.

==== 1992 season ====
Head coach Joe Bugel retained McDonald as the starting strong safety to begin the regular season and paired him with Mike Zordich. In Week 6, McDonald set a season-high with 11 combined tackles (10 solo) during a 21—31 loss at the New York Giants. On December 12, 1992, McDonald made five combined tackles (four solo), one pass deflection, a fumble recovery, and intercepted a pass attempt by Kent Graham as the Cardinals routed the New York Giants 0—19. He started in all 16 games throughout the 1992 NFL season and led the Cardinals with 107 combined tackles (89 solo) while also making seven pass deflections, three fumble recoveries, a forced fumble, and two interceptions. He was selected for the 1993 Pro Bowl, marking the third Pro Bowl selection of his career.

==== 1993 season ====
Following the 1992 NFL season, McDonald became a free agent and was highly sought, meeting and visiting multiple teams including the San Francisco 49ers, Atlanta Falcons, Philadelphia Eagles, Tampa Bay Buccaneers, Kansas City Chiefs, Seattle Seahawks, and Los Angeles Raiders. The Phoenix Cardinals designated McDonald with their franchise tag and was set to receive compensation if he departed as a free agent. The Cardinals offered McDonald a five—year, $10 million contract but had the offer rejected due to the lack of guaranteed money.

=== San Francisco 49ers ===
On April 7, 1993, the San Francisco 49ers signed McDonald to a five—year, $12.75 million contract that included an initial signing bonus of $2.25 million. He entered training camp slated as the de facto starting strong safety following the departure of David Whitmore. Head coach George Seifert named McDonald the starting strong safety to begin the regular season and paired him with free safety Dana Hall.

Entering Week 3, defensive coordinator Bill McPherson elected to promote Merton Hanks to the starting role at free safety for the rest of the season. McDonald and Hanks would become one of the top safety tandems of all time following their pairing. In Week 7, McDonald set a season-high with 12 solo tackles during a 17—26 loss at the Dallas Cowboys. On October 24, 1993, McDonald made four solo tackles, a pass deflection, and had his first interception as a member of the 49ers against his former team on an interception thrown by Steve Beuerlein to wide receiver Ricky Proehl during a 14—28 win against the Phoenix Cardinals. In Week 11, he made five combined tackles (three solo), a pass break-up, and intercepted Craig Erickson's pass during a 45—21 victory at the Tampa Bay Buccaneers. He started in all 16 games throughout the season and made 91 combined tackles (76 solo), 10 pass deflections, three interceptions, and a fumble recovery. He was named to the 1994 Pro Bowl. During the 1993 NFL season, McDonald donated $2,000 for every 49ers victory to the Boys and Girls Clubs of the Bay Area, netting $22,000 for those organizations.

The San Francisco 49ers finished the 1993 NFL season first in the NFC West with a 10—6 record, clinching a playoff berth and a first round bye. On January 15, 1994, McDonald started in the Divisional Round marking his first career playoff appearance and made three solo tackles, one pass deflection, and intercepted a pass by Phil Simms as the 49ers routed the New York Giants 3—44. The following game, the 49ers were eliminated from the playoffs after losing in the NFC Championship Game 21—38 at the Dallas Cowboys.

==== 1994 season ====
On February 17, 1994, the San Francisco 49ers hired Ray Rhodes to takeover as their defensive coordinator after Bill McPherson was promoted to assistant head coach. Head coach George Seifert retained McDonald as the starting strong safety to begin the season. He was paired with free safety Dana Hall. On September 14, 1994, the San Francisco 49ers and McDonald agreed to restructure his contract and added an extension throughout the 1998 NFL season. McDonald and teammates Ken Norton Jr. and Gary Plummer agreed to restructure their contracts in order for the 49ers to get $1.3 million under the salary cap threshold to sign free agent cornerback Deion Sanders.

On October 16, 1994, McDonald made five combined tackles (four solo), one pass break-up, and returned a fumble by running back Craig Heyward for a 49—yard touchdown during a 42—3 victory at the Atlanta Falcons. In Week 8, McDonald set a season-high with nine combined tackles (eight solo) as the 49ers routed the Tampa Bay Buccaneers 41—16. On November 6, 1994, McDonald recorded eight solo tackles, had one pass break-up, and returned an interception thrown by Gus Frerotte for a 73—yard touchdown during a 37—22 victory at the Washington Redskins. In Week 13, he recorded two solo tackles, set a season-high with two pass deflections, and intercepted Jim Everett's pass attempt to Wesley Walls during a 35—14 win at the New Orleans Saints. He started in all 16 games for the second consecutive season and made 76 combined tackles (68 solo), nine pass deflections, two interceptions, a fumble recovery, a forced fumble, and set a career-high with two defensive touchdowns. He was voted to the 1995 Pro Bowl, alongside fellow defensive backs Merton Hanks and NFL Defensive Player of the Year Deion Sanders.

The San Francisco 49ers finished the 1994 NFL season atop of the NFC West with a 13—3 record, clinching a playoff berth and a first round bye. The 49ers routed the Chicago Bears 44—15 in the Divisional Round and defeated the rival Dallas Cowboys 38—28 in the NFC Championship Game to advance to the Super Bowl. On January 29, 1995, McDonald started in Super Bowl XXIX and recorded nine solo tackles and made two pass deflections as the v 49ers defeated the San Diego Chargers 49—26. McDonald earned his first Super Bowl ring with the 49ers in 1994.

==== 1995 season ====
On February 3, 1995, the San Francisco 49ers hired former New York Jets head coach Pete Carroll as their new defensive coordinator following Ray Rhodes departure to become head coach of the Philadelphia Eagles. McDonald and Merton Hanks returned as the starting safeties to begin the season.

On September 3, 1995, McDonald made two combined tackles (one solo), a pass deflection, and returned an interception thrown by Jim Everett for a 52—yard touchdown during a 24—22 victory at the New Orleans Saints. In Week 2, McDonald made three solo tackles, a pass deflection, and returned an interception on a pass Jeff George threw to wide receiver Terance Mathis as the 49ers defeated the Atlanta Falcons 10—41. On September 17, 1995, McDonald recorded seven combined tackles (five solo) and set a season-high with three pass deflections as the 49ers routed the New England Patriots 28—3. In Week 4, he set a season-high with 11 combined tackles (nine solo) and broke up a pass during a 24—27 loss at the Detroit Lions. He started all 16 games for the fourth consecutive season and finished with 90 combined tackles (63 solo), 17 pass deflections, four interceptions, two forced fumbles, and two touchdowns. He was named to the 1996 Pro Bowl alongside Merton Hanks.

==== 1996 season ====
Head coach George Seifert retained McDonald and Merton Hanks as their starting safeties. In Week 8, McDonald set a season-high with ten solo tackles and made one pass deflection during a 28—21 win against the Cincinnati Bengals. The following week, he set a season-high with 11 combined tackles (four solo) and made one pass deflection during a 10—9 victory against the Houston Oilers in Week 9. He started all 16 games throughout the 1996 NFL season and made 133 combined tackles (87 solo), 10 pass deflections, two interceptions, and one sack.

The San Francisco 49ers finished second in the NFC West with a 12—4 record, earning a wild-card berth. On December 29, 1996, McDonald recorded one solo tackle, led his team with four pass deflections, and sealed the 49ers' 0—14 victory against the Philadelphia Eagles in the NFC Wild-Card Game.

==== 1997 season ====
Following the departure of Pete Carroll to the New England Patriots, the 49ers promoted linebackers coach John Marshall to defensive coordinator. The duo of McDonald and Merton Hanks returned as the starting safeties. On November 2, 1997, McDonald set a season-high with ten combined tackles (seven solo), made one pass deflection, and secured the 49ers' 10—17 win against the Dallas Cowboys by intercepting Troy Aikman's pass to wide receiver Stepfret Williams with 40 seconds left in the fourth quarter. On November 16, 1997, McDonald made two combined tackles (one solo), a pass deflection, and intercepted a pass Kerry Collins attempted to throw to wide receiver Rocket Ismail before exiting during the third quarter of a 19—27 victory against the Carolina Panthers due to a leg injury. He suffered a fractured left foot and was subsequently sidelined as the 49ers defeated the San Diego Chargers 17—10 in Week 13. He finished the season with 62 combined tackles (51 solo), seven pass deflections, three fumble recoveries, and three interceptions in 15 games and 15 starts.

== NFL career statistics ==
=== Regular season ===
Year	Team	Games		Tackles				Interceptions					Fumbles			
Year	Team	GP	GS	Comb	Solo	Ast	Sck	Int	Yds	Avg	Lng	TD	FF	FR	Yds	TD
1987	STL	3	0	7	—	—	0.0	0	0	0.0	0	0	0	0	0	0
1988	PHX	16	15	115	—	—	2.0	2	11	5.5	11	0	4	1	9	0
1989	PHX	16	16	155	—	—	0.0	7	170	24.3	53	1	0	1	1	0
1990	PHX	16	16	114	—	—	0.0	4	63	15.8	38	0	1	1	0	0
1991	PHX	13	13	96	—	—	0.0	5	36	7.2	13	0	0	1	0	0
1992	PHX	16	16	107	—	—	0.5	2	35	17.5	20	0	1	3	2	0
1993	SF	16	15	91	—	—	0.0	3	23	7.7	21	0	0	1	15	0
1994	SF	16	16	72	67	5	0.0	2	79	39.5	73	1	1	1	49	1
1995	SF	16	16	75	61	14	0.0	4	135	52	2	2	0	0	0	
1996	SF	16	16	98	81	17	1.0	2	14	7.0	14	0	0	1	0	0
1997	SF	15	15	62	51	11	0.0	3	34	11.3	17	0	0	3	0	0
1998	SF	16	16	78	68	10	4.0	4	22	5.5	18	0	0	2	0	0
1999	SF	16	16	69	52	17	2.0	2	18	9.0	18	0	1	1	0	0
Career		191	187	1,139	380	74	9.5	40	640	16.0	73	4	10	16	76	1

== Coaching career ==
McDonald coached youth football leading the Malloch Elementary football team to two undefeated seasons from 2001 to 2003. McDonald coached for his alma mater Edison High School in Fresno, where he coached his sons, Timothy McDonald Jr. and Tevin McDonald. McDonald left Edison High in the 2010 football season, but came back for 2011 and putting Edison back at the top. McDonald left Edison High in 2012 and was signed as a secondary coach for Fresno State. After one season at Fresno State Mcdonald was signed as a DB coach for the New York Jets under Rex Ryan. He followed Ryan to the Buffalo Bills in 2015, where he served as defensive backs coach for two years.

== Personal life ==
McDonald and wife Alycia have two sons, Timothy Jr. (TJ) and Tevin, and one daughter Taryn. TJ played safety at his father's alma mater, USC, and was drafted by the St. Louis Rams in the 3rd round of the 2013 draft. He signed with the Miami Dolphins as a free agent in 2017. Tevin played 2 seasons with crosstown rival, UCLA. Tevin was dismissed from UCLA, Jim Mora citing his release as a violation of team rules and transferred to Eastern Washington University; he went undrafted in the 2015 draft and was signed by the Oakland Raiders as a free agent.
