= Lee Woodall =

American football player (born 1969)

No. 41, 54
- Position: Linebacker

Personal information
- Born: October 31, 1969 (age 57); Carlisle, Pennsylvania, U.S.
- Listed height: 6 ft 1 in (1.85 m)
- Listed weight: 224 lb (102 kg)

Career information
- High school: Carlisle
- College: West Chester (PA)
- NFL draft: 1994: 6th round, 182nd overall pick

Career history
- San Francisco 49ers (1994–1999); Carolina Panthers (2000); Denver Broncos (2001)

Awards and highlights
- Super Bowl champion (XXIX); 2× Pro Bowl (1995, 1997); PFWA All-Rookie Team (1994)

Career NFL statistics
- Tackles: 469
- Sacks: 10
- Interceptions: 6
- Stats at Pro Football Reference

Lee Artis Woodall (born October 31, 1969) is an American former professional football player who was a linebacker for eight seasons in the National Football League (NFL) from 1994 to 2001. He played college football for the West Chester Golden Rams and was selected by the San Francisco 49ers in the sixth round of the 1994 NFL draft.

== Football Career ==
He was a rookie for the 49ers during the 1994 season when they beat the San Diego Chargers 49–26 in Super Bowl XXIX. A personal highlight was a fumble return for 96 yards in 1995 in a win against the Buffalo Bills. Selected to the Pro Bowl in 1995 and 1997; his last NFL season was in 2001 with the Denver Broncos.

Woodall made a last attempt to play football by signing with the Toronto Argonauts of the Canadian Football League (CFL) in March 2006.

== Personal life ==
Woodall is married to Terri Matthews—an Emmy-nominated, best-selling author, international speaker, and businesswoman.

== NFL career statistics ==
Legend
	Won the Super Bowl
	Led the league
**Bold**	Career high

=== Regular season ===
Year	Team	Games		Tackles				Interceptions				Fumbles			
Year	Team	GP	GS	Comb	Solo	Ast	Sck	Int	Yds	TD	Lng	FF	FR	Yds	TD
1994	SFO	15	13	60	45	15	1.0	0	0	0	0	1	1	0	0
1995	SFO	16	15	61	50	11	**3.0**	**2**	0	0	0	**2**	**2**	**98**	**1**
1996	SFO	16	13	55	41	14	2.5	0	0	0	0	0	0	0	0
1997	SFO	16	16	57	42	15	0.0	**2**	**55**	0	**55**	**2**	0	0	0
1998	SFO	15	15	59	46	13	0.0	1	4	0	4	0	0	0	0
1999	SFO	16	16	68	54	14	2.5	0	0	0	0	1	0	0	0
2000	CAR	16	16	**97**	**71**	**26**	0.0	1	0	0	0	**2**	1	0	0
2001	DEN	14	0	12	10	2	1.0	0	0	0	0	0	0	0	0
		124	104	469	359	110	10.0	6	59	0	55	8	4	98	1

=== Playoffs ===
Year	Team	Games		Tackles				Interceptions				Fumbles			
Year	Team	GP	GS	Comb	Solo	Ast	Sck	Int	Yds	TD	Lng	FF	FR	Yds	TD
1994	SFO	3	3	6	5	1	0.0	0	0	0	0	0	0	0	0
1995	SFO	1	1	1	1	0	0.0	0	0	0	0	0	0	0	0
1996	SFO	2	2	11	9	2	1.0	0	0	0	0	0	0	0	0
1997	SFO	2	2	11	**10**	1	0.0	0	0	0	0	0	0	0	0
1998	SFO	2	2	**12**	9	**3**	0.0	**1**	**17**	0	**17**	0	0	0	0
		10	10	41	34	7	1.0	1	17	0	17	0	0	0	0
