= Merton Hanks =

American football player (born 1968)

No. 36
- Position: Safety

Personal information
- Born: March 12, 1968 (age 58); Dallas, Texas, U.S.
- Listed height: 6 ft 2 in (1.88 m)
- Listed weight: 181 lb (82 kg)

Career information
- High school: Lake Highlands (Dallas)
- College: Iowa (1987–1990)
- NFL draft: 1991: 5th round, 122nd overall pick

Career history
- San Francisco 49ers (1991–1998); Seattle Seahawks (1999)

Awards and highlights
- Super Bowl champion (XXIX); 2× First-team All-Pro (1994–1995); 2× Second-team All-Pro (1996–1997); 4× Pro Bowl (1994–1997); NFL Alumni Defensive Back of the Year (1995); Third-team All-American (1990); First-team All-Big Ten (1990); Second-team All-Big Ten (1989)

Career NFL statistics
- Tackles: 496
- Interceptions: 33
- Interception yards: 410
- Touchdowns: 3
- Stats at Pro Football Reference

Merton Edward Hanks (born March 12, 1968) is an American former professional football player who was a safety for nine seasons in the National Football League (NFL) during the 1990s, primarily with the San Francisco 49ers. He was a five-time All-Pro and four-time Pro Bowl selection with the 49ers, winning a Super Bowl (XXIX) with the team.

Hanks played college football for the Iowa Hawkeyes, earning All-American honors in 1990. He played eight seasons in the NFL with the 49ers and one with the Seattle Seahawks. He is currently a senior associate commissioner for the Pac-12.

== College career ==
Hanks attended Lake Highlands High School, where he was a district track-and-field champion. He attended the University of Iowa, earning all-Big Ten honors at cornerback. However, at the NFL scouting combine, his 40-yard dash times were very slow, and he was not drafted until the fifth round by the San Francisco 49ers with the 122nd overall pick.

== Professional career ==
Pre-draft measurables
Height	Weight	Arm length	Hand span	40-yard dash	10-yard split	20-yard split	20-yard shuttle	Vertical jump
6 ft 1 1/2 in (1.87 m)	177 lb (80 kg)	32 in (0.81 m)	9 in (0.23 m)	4.77 s	1.62 s	2.72 s	4.15 s	36.0 in (0.91 m)

=== San Francisco 49ers ===
The San Francisco 49ers selected Hanks in the fifth round (122nd overall) of the 1991 NFL draft. Hanks was the ninth safety drafted in 1991.

==== 1991 season ====
Throughout training camp, he competed for a roster spot as a backup cornerback and special teams player. Head coach George Seifert named Hanks a backup cornerback to begin the regular season and listed him as the fourth cornerback on the depth chart behind Eric Davis, Don Griffin, and Kevin Lewis. He remained inactive as a healthy scratch for the first two games (Weeks 1-2) of the season. On September 11, 1991, the 49ers placed Eric Davis on injured reserve due to torn muscles in his left shoulder and subsequently promoted Hanks to the active roster.

On September 15, 1991, Hanks made his professional regular season debut as the 49ers lost at the Minnesota Vikings 14—17. On October 20, 1991, Hanks earned his first career start as a nickelback and set a season-high with seven combined tackles (six solo), made one pass deflection, forced a fumble, and had a fumble recovery as the 49ers routed the Detroit Lions 35—3. He finished his rookie season with 37 combined tackles (34 solo), four pass deflections, two fumble recoveries, and a forced fumble in 13 games and eight starts.

==== 1992 season ====
During training camp, Hanks competed against Mike McGruder, Alan Grant, and Kevin Lewis to be the third cornerback on the depth chart. Head coach George Seifert named Hanks the third cornerback on the depth chart to begin the season behind starters Eric Davis and Don Griffin. On September 13, 1992, Hanks earned his first start at strong safety and recorded five solo tackles, made one pass deflection, and had his first career interception after picking off Jim Kelly's pass to Andre Reed during a 34—31 loss to the Buffalo Bills. In Week 7, he set a season-high with eight solo tackles and had one pass break-up during a 56—17 win against the Atlanta Falcons. On November 9, 1992, Hanks made six combined tackles (five solo), set a season-high with two pass deflections, and intercepted a pass by Billy Joe Tolliver during a 41—3 win at the Atlanta Falcons. He finished the season with 64 combined tackles (53 solo), seven pass deflections, and two interceptions in 16 games and five starts.

The San Francisco 49ers finished the 1992 NFL season first in the NFC West with a 14—2 record, clinching a playoff berth and a first round bye. On January 9, 1993, Hanks started in his first career playoff game and recorded three solo tackles as the 49ers defeated the Washington Redskins 20—13 to win the NFC Divisional Round.

==== 1993 season ====
In Week 5, he recorded four combined tackles (two solo) and set a career-high with six pass deflections during a 38—19 win against the Minnesota Vikings. On October 24, 1993, Hanks made three combined tackles (two solo), four pass deflections, and intercepted a pass Steve Beuerlein attempted to throw to Ricky Proehl as the 49ers defeated the Phoenix Cardinals 14—28. On November 22, 1993, Hanks made four solo tackles, two pass deflections, set a career-high with two interceptions, and picked off a pass attempt by Wade Wilson and returned it 67—yards to score his first career touchdown as the 49ers routed the New Orleans Saints 7—42. Entering Week 11, Hanks was officially named the starting free safety for the rest of the season, supplanting Dana Hall.

On December 24, 1993, the San Francisco 49ers signed Hanks to a three—year, $2.80 million contract extension. In Week 18, Hanks set a season-high with 11 solo tackles during a 34—37 overtime loss to the Philadelphia Eagles. He started in all 16 games for the first time in his career and finished the season with 71 combined tackles (62 solo), 16 pass deflections, three interceptions, a forced fumble, and one touchdown.

==== 1994 season ====
On February 17, 1994, the San Francisco 49ers hired Ray Rhodes to be their new defensive coordinator after Bill McPherson was promoted to assistant head coach. Rhodes opted to move Hanks from free safety to cornerback following the departure of Don Griffin. Head coach George Seifert named Hanks a starting cornerback to begin the regular season and paired him with Eric Davis as Dana Hall took over the starting role at free safety. On September 15, 1994, the 49ers signed cornerback Deion Sanders. Hanks was subsequently moved back to free safety and supplanted Dana Hall as the starter.

On September 25, 1994, Hanks made four solo tackles, three pass deflections, and secured the 49ers 13—24 win against the New Orleans Saints by picking off a pass by Jim Everett with 2:03 remaining in the fourth quarter. On November 13, 1994, Hanks recorded four solo tackles, set a season-high with four pass deflections, and had two interceptions on pass attempts by Troy Aikman as the 49ers defeated the Dallas Cowboys 14—21. In Week 14, he made six combined tackles (five solo), two pass deflections, and tied his season-high of two interceptions on passes thrown by Jeff George as the 49ers routed the Atlanta Falcons 14—50. In Week 17, he set a season-high with eight combined tackles (five solo), made one pass deflection, and recovered a fumble during a 14—21 loss at the Minnesota Vikings. He started in all 16 games for the second consecutive season and made 79 combined tackles (66 solo), 18 pass deflections, seven interceptions, two fumble recoveries, and a forced fumble. Hanks performance throughout the season earned him a selection to the 1995 Pro Bowl, marking the first of four consecutive Pro Bowl selections of his career.

The San Francisco 49ers finished the 1994 NFL season atop the NFC West with a 13—3 record, clinching a playoff berth and earning a first round bye. On January 7, 1995, Hanks started in NFC Divisional Round and made one solo tackle, a pass deflection, and intercepted a pass attempt by Steve Walsh as the 49ers won 15—44. The following week, he made five solo tackles as the 49ers defeated the Dallas Cowboys 38—28 to win the NFC Championship Game to advance to the Super Bowl. On January 29, 1995, Hanks started in Super Bowl XXIX and recorded two combined tackles (one solo) and made two pass deflections as the 49ers defeated the San Diego Chargers 26—49. Hanks earned the first and only Super Bowl ring of his career.

==== 1995 season ====
On February 3, 1995, the San Francisco 49ers hired former New York Jets head coach Pete Carroll as their new defensive coordinator following Ray Rhodes departure to become head coach of the Philadelphia Eagles. Carroll chose to retain Hanks and Tim McDonald as the starting safeties to begin the regular season.

On September 17, 1995, Hanks made four solo tackles, two pass deflections, and set a season-high with two interceptions on pass attempts thrown by Drew Bledsoe as the 49ers routed the New England Patriots 3—28. On November 12, 1995, Hanks made two tackles, one pass deflection, an interception, and recovered a fumble by Michael Irvin and returned it for a 38—yard touchdown during a 38—20 victory at the Dallas Cowboys. In Week 17, he set a season-high with seven solo tackles during a 27—28 loss at the Atlanta Falcons. He started all 16 games for the third consecutive season and made 72 combined tackles (48 solo), 13 pass deflections, five interceptions, two fumble recoveries, and scored one touchdown.

==== 1996 season ====
On September 13, 1996, the San Francisco 49ers signed Hanks to a seven—year, $22.40 million contract extension that included an initial signing bonus of $4.80 million. Hanks became the NFL's highest paid safety with this contract.

He was well known for his interceptions and returns, as well as his unique "chicken dance" celebrations that were later emulated by basketball star Shaquille O'Neal.

==== 1999 season ====
On September 7, 1999, the San Francisco 49ers officially released Hanks due to salary cap concerns.

== Executive career ==
Hanks was previously the assistant director of operations for the National Football League, and then the league's vice president of operations in charge of player conduct. Hanks began his tenure as Conference USA senior associate commissioner in July 2016, a position in which he was responsible for the conference's football and baseball operations, including officiating, scheduling, game operations, player conduct and safety. On September 8, 2020, Hanks became the senior associate commissioner, football operations for the Pac-12 conference.

Hanks regularly embarks on speaking tours.

== NFL career statistics ==
=== Regular season ===
Year	Team	Games		Tackles				Interceptions					Fumbles			
Year	Team	GP	GS	Comb	Solo	Ast	Sck	Int	Yds	Avg	Lng	TD	FF	FR	Yds	TD
1991	SF	13	8	37	—	—	0.0	0	0	0.0	0	0	1	2	0	0
1992	SF	16	5	64	—	—	0.0	2	5	2.5	4	0	0	0	0	0
1993	SF	16	14	67	—	—	0.0	3	104	34.7	67	1	0	1	0	0
1994	SF	16	16	72	65	7	0.5	7	93	13.3	38	0	0	2	0	0
1995	SF	16	16	63	54	9	0.0	5	31	6.2	23	0	0	2	69	1
1996	SF	16	16	63	54	9	0.0	4	7	1.8	8	0	1	0	0	0
1997	SF	16	16	60	50	10	0.0	6	103	17.2	55	1	0	2	38	1
1998	SF	16	16	48	42	6	0.5	4	37	9.3	37	0	1	1	0	0
1999	SEA	12	1	22	15	7	2.0	2	30	15.0	23	1	0	0	0	0
Career		137	108	496	280	48	3.0	33	410	12.4	67	3	4	10	107	2
