= Carl Jackson (American football) =

American former football player and coach (born 1940)

Personal information
- Born: August 16, 1940 (age 86); Bay City, Texas, U.S.

Career information
- Position: Quarterback
- High school: Hilliard (Bay City)
- College: Prairie View A&M (1958–1961)

Career history
- North Texas State (1976–1978) Running backs; Iowa (1979–1991) Running backs; Iowa (1989–1991) Offensive coordinator; San Francisco 49ers (1992–1996) Running backs; Texas (1997) Running backs; Iowa (1999–2007) Running backs

Awards and highlights
- Super Bowl champion (XXIX)

Carl Jackson Sr. (born August 16, 1940) is an American former professional football coach and player. He has coached for North Texas, Iowa, Texas and the San Francisco 49ers, where he won a Super Bowl. Jackson played college football for the Prairie View A&M Panthers at quarterback.

== College career ==
Jackson played college football for the Prairie View A&M Panthers from 1960 to 1961 at quarterback. He was also a four-time All-Southwestern Athletic Conference long jumper with a career long of 25 feet 3 3/4 inches.

== Coaching career ==
Jackson began coaching at Abraham Lincoln High School in Port Arthur, Texas from 1963 to 1976. He then moved to the college ranks, coaching at North Texas State from 1976 to 1978 as the running backs coach. After Hayden Fry took the Iowa head coaching job, Jackson followed him there and remained the running backs coach. He served in that capacity until 1991, whilst also serving as the offensive coordinator for three seasons, starting in 1989.

On February 13, 1992, Jackson was announced as the running backs coach for the San Francisco 49ers. In 1995, he coached in his first Super Bowl as the 49ers defeated the San Diego Chargers 49–26 in Super Bowl XXIX. Jackson was the running backs coach for two more seasons before he was dismissed by new head coach, Steve Mariucci.

Jackson returned to the college level to coach running backs at Texas in 1997. He would serve just one year at Texas after a regime change resulted in his dismissal. Jackson went back to Abraham Lincoln High School for a year before he returned Iowa in 1999. On February 10, 2008, he retired from coaching.
