= Ricky Watters =

American football player (born 1969)

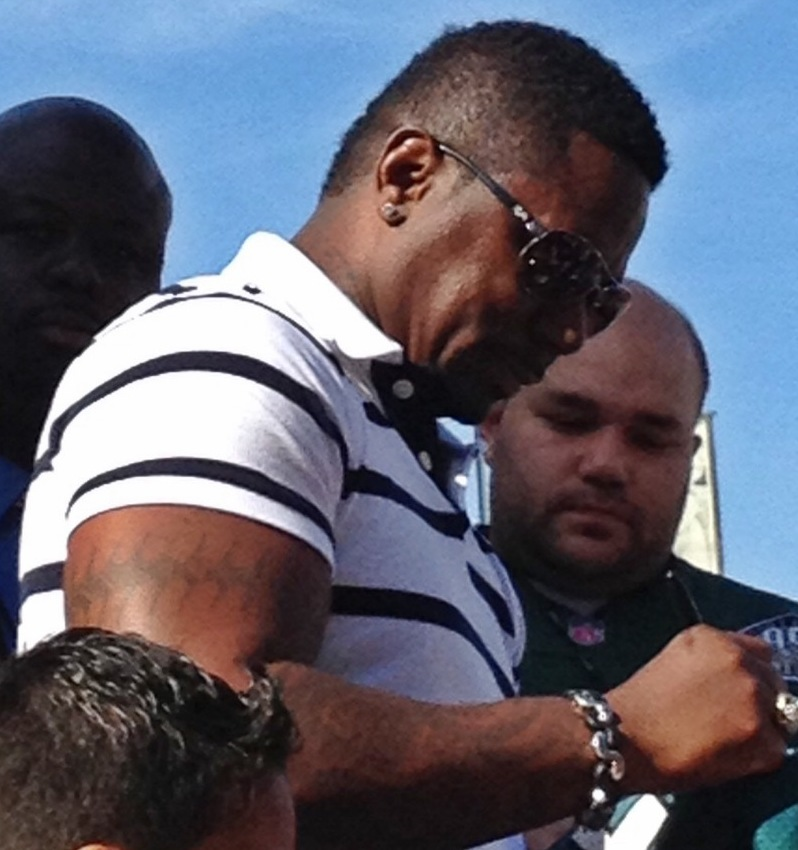
- Watters in 2016

No. 32
- Position: Running back

Personal information
- Born: April 7, 1969 (age 57); Harrisburg, Pennsylvania, U.S.
- Listed height: 6 ft 1 in (1.85 m)
- Listed weight: 217 lb (98 kg)

Career information
- High school: Bishop McDevitt (Harrisburg)
- College: Notre Dame (1987–1990)
- NFL draft: 1991: 2nd round, 45th overall pick

Career history
- San Francisco 49ers (1991–1994); Philadelphia Eagles (1995–1997); Seattle Seahawks (1998–2001)

Awards and highlights
- Super Bowl champion (XXIX); 5× Pro Bowl (1992–1996); Seattle Seahawks 35th Anniversary Team; NFL records: Most rushing touchdowns in a playoff game: 5; Most points scored by a player in a playoff game: 30

Career NFL statistics
- Rushing yards: 10,643
- Rushing average: 4.1
- Rushing touchdowns: 78
- Receptions: 467
- Receiving yards: 4,248
- Receiving touchdowns: 13
- Stats at Pro Football Reference

Richard James Watters (born April 7, 1969) is an American former professional football player who was a running back for the San Francisco 49ers, Philadelphia Eagles, and Seattle Seahawks of the National Football League (NFL). Watters played college football for the Notre Dame Fighting Irish, where he was a running back on the school's 1988 national champion team. In the NFL, he won a second championship in Super Bowl XXIX with the 49ers.

Watters was known throughout his playing career for his outstanding receiving skills and his unique high-stepping running style, which earned him the nickname Ricky "Running" Watters from ESPN sportscaster Chris Berman. Watters appeared in the movie Any Given Sunday as a running back for the fictional Dallas Knights.

Currently Watters is a motivational speaker for children who were adopted, as he was. He is also a recording artist, music producer, president and CEO of Tigero Entertainment and an author, having written the book, For Who For What, a Warrior’s Journey. Watters was the head football coach for Oak Ridge High School in Orlando, Florida until he resigned on October 1, 2013. An architecture major in college, he returned to Notre Dame in 2014 to complete the three final credits necessary for a graphic design degree.

== Early life ==
Watters attended Bishop McDevitt High School in Harrisburg, Pennsylvania, where he played quarterback and wore #12; he was a four-year letterman in football. He played pewee, pony, and varsity grade school football for Our Lady of the Blessed Sacrament (OLBS) Golden Gales.

== College career ==
=== Recruitment and 1987 season ===
Watters arrived at the University of Notre Dame in 1987 as a highly touted member of head coach Lou Holtz's second recruiting class. The class was the Fighting Irish's second consecutive top 10 recruiting class, following on the heels of the '86 class which included star quarterback Tony Rice. Watters began the season backing up Mark Green and occasionally returning kickoffs. Behind Rice and an infusion of new talent, and the team went 8–4 and appeared in the Cotton Bowl Classic against Texas A&M.

=== 1988 national championship season ===
Following the departure of Heisman Trophy winner Tim Brown, Holtz moved Watters to Brown's flanker position for the 1988 season to ignite the Irish passing attack. The move paid dividends as Watters led the team in receiving. Watters' contribution on special teams was equally impressive as he returned two punts for touchdowns.

==== Suspension against USC ====
Before the annual Notre Dame-USC game, Holtz suspended Watters and running back Tony Brooks for disciplinary reasons. Playing their biggest road game of the season against the #2 ranked Trojans without their leading receiver and rusher, Notre Dame pulled out a convincing 27–10 victory.

==== Fiesta Bowl ====
In a season filled with victories over ranked opponents, Notre Dame defeated the #3 ranked West Virginia 34–21 in the Fiesta Bowl to secure the school's 11th national championship. With six All-Americans, the team cemented its place as one of the greatest teams in the history of college football.

=== 1989 season ===
1989 would again see Notre Dame contending for the national championship. With teammate Tony Brooks suspended for the season for academic reasons, Holtz switched Watters back to tailback. Watters did not disappoint as Notre Dame spent 13 weeks ranked #1 before losing to Miami 27–10 in their regular season finale. The Irish concluded the season with a convincing 21–6 win over #1 ranked Colorado in the Orange Bowl, and finished the year ranked #2 behind Miami. For the season, Watters finished second on the team in rushing behind quarterback Tony Rice.

== Professional career ==
Pre-draft measurables
| Height | Weight | Arm length | Hand span | 40-yard dash | 10-yard split | 20-yard split | 20-yard shuttle | Vertical jump | Broad jump | Bench press |
|---|---|---|---|---|---|---|---|---|---|---|
| 6 ft 1 in (1.85 m) | 212 lb (96 kg) | 31 1/2 in (0.80 m) | 9 1/8 in (0.23 m) | 4.71 s | 1.68 s | 2.76 s | 4.41 s | 34.5 in (0.88 m) | 9 ft 3 in (2.82 m) | 18 reps |

Watters played for ten seasons in the NFL with San Francisco, Philadelphia, and Seattle. He was selected by San Francisco in the second round of the 1991 NFL draft, but sat out the entire 1991 season due to injuries. He started at running back for the 49ers during the next three seasons, and San Francisco's offense led the NFL in scoring and yardage each year. The 49ers reached the NFC Championship Game in 1992 and 1993, falling both times to the Dallas Cowboys, before finally vanquishing Dallas in the 1994 NFC Championship on their way to a Super Bowl championship. In a 1994 NFC Divisional Round game, Watters set an NFL postseason record with five rushing touchdowns in the game, as the 49ers trounced the New York Giants 44–3. His thirty points scored in the game set a new record for most scored by one player in a postseason game that still stands. In Super Bowl XXIX the following season, Watters scored three touchdowns in San Francisco's 49–26 victory over the San Diego Chargers, tying a Super Bowl mark shared by fellow 49ers Roger Craig and Jerry Rice, and later matched by Terrell Davis of the Denver Broncos, James White of the New England Patriots, and Jalen Hurts of the Philadelphia Eagles.

Watters joined the Philadelphia Eagles in 1995 as a free agent. He gained notoriety in Philadelphia for his infamous line "For who? For what?" after his first game as an Eagle on September 3, 1995, against the Tampa Bay Buccaneers. The line was an answer to a question on why he didn't stretch himself to catch a Randall Cunningham pass that would've likely resulted in a big hit from a defender and instead "short armed" a pass to avoid contact in a 21–6 loss. But he quickly established himself as a very productive player for the Eagles, leading the league in yards from scrimmage in 1996 and helping Philadelphia get to the playoffs twice. In three seasons with the Eagles, he played and started every game and recorded 3,794 rushing yards and 31 rushing touchdowns on 975 carries. In 1998, Watters joined the Seattle Seahawks and played with them until his retirement in 2002. He finished his professional career with 10,643 yards rushing and 4,248 yards receiving and 91 total touchdowns in regular season play. As of the end of the 2011 NFL season, Watters is one of only two NFL running backs to rush for over 1,000 yards in a season for three teams, along with Willis McGahee. Watters was on the ballot along with Terrell Davis, former NFL commissioner Paul Tagliabue, and others for the February 3, 2007 Pro Football Hall of Fame selections.

On a 2008 episode of NFL Top 10, a documentary series produced by the NFL Network, Watters was ranked #7 out of the top 10 players yet to be inducted into the Pro Football Hall of Fame. Despite his five Pro Bowl selections and his high rankings in total rushing yards, rushing touchdowns and total touchdowns, criticism of his lack of professional demeanor was cited by voters as a primary reason for his failure to be inducted. In particular, he was considered to be a "loud mouth" by some critics, who argued it overshadowed his on-the-field accomplishments. Others interviewed said his behavior was no different from other inductees, in particular, Joe Namath and Lawrence Taylor. The "For Who, For What?" incident is considered by former voters as a defining moment that could hurt his chances, as one Hall of Fame voter said that it would be brought up as a negative by someone whenever Watters' name came up in the future. Another explanation of why he has not yet been voted into the Hall was that despite scoring three touchdowns in Super Bowl XXIX, his achievement was overshadowed by the play of quarterback Steve Young, who threw for six touchdowns and won MVP honors. He has been a semifinalist for the Hall of Fame in 2020 and 2022.

== NFL career statistics ==
Legend
| | Won the Super Bowl |
| **Bold** | Career high |

=== Regular season ===
| Year | Team | GP | Rushing | | | | | Receiving | | | | | Fumbles | |
| Year | Team | GP | Att | Yds | Avg | Lng | TD | Rec | Yds | Avg | Lng | TD | Fum | Lost |
|---|---|---|---|---|---|---|---|---|---|---|---|---|---|---|
| 1992 | SF | 14 | 206 | 1,013 | 4.9 | 43 | 9 | 43 | 405 | 9.4 | 35 | 2 | 2 | 1 |
| 1993 | SF | 13 | 208 | 950 | 4.6 | 39 | 10 | 31 | 326 | 10.5 | 48 | 1 | 5 | 2 |
| 1994 | SF | 16 | 239 | 877 | 3.7 | 23 | 6 | 66 | 719 | 10.9 | 65 | 5 | 8 | 3 |
| 1995 | PHI | 16 | 337 | 1,273 | 3.8 | 57 | 11 | 62 | 434 | 7.0 | 24 | 1 | 4 | 1 |
| 1996 | PHI | 16 | 353 | 1,411 | 4.0 | 56 | 13 | 51 | 444 | 8.7 | 36 | 0 | 5 | 5 |
| 1997 | PHI | 16 | 285 | 1,110 | 3.9 | 28 | 7 | 48 | 440 | 9.2 | 37 | 0 | 3 | 2 |
| 1998 | SEA | 16 | 319 | 1,239 | 3.9 | 39 | 9 | 52 | 373 | 7.2 | 24 | 0 | 4 | 2 |
| 1999 | SEA | 16 | 325 | 1,210 | 3.7 | 45 | 5 | 40 | 387 | 9.7 | 25 | 2 | 3 | 3 |
| 2000 | SEA | 16 | 278 | 1,242 | 4.5 | 55 | 7 | 63 | 613 | 9.7 | 59 | 2 | 5 | 2 |
| 2001 | SEA | 5 | 72 | 318 | 4.4 | 40 | 1 | 11 | 107 | 9.7 | 34 | 0 | 1 | 0 |
| Career | | 144 | 2,622 | 10,643 | 4.1 | 57 | 78 | 467 | 4,248 | 9.1 | 65 | 13 | 40 | 21 |
