= Marc Logan =

American football player (born 1965)

No. 29, 23, 20, 43
- Position: Running back

Personal information
- Born: May 9, 1965 (age 61); Lexington, Kentucky, U.S.
- Listed height: 6 ft 0 in (1.83 m)
- Listed weight: 217 lb (98 kg)

Career information
- High school: Bryan Station (Lexington)
- College: Kentucky
- NFL draft: 1987: 5th round, 130th overall pick

Career history
- Cincinnati Bengals (1987); Cleveland Browns (1987)*; Cincinnati Bengals (1988); Miami Dolphins (1989–1991); San Francisco 49ers (1992–1994); Washington Redskins (1995–1997)
- * Offseason or practice squad member only

Awards and highlights
- Super Bowl champion (XXIX)

Career NFL statistics
- Rushing yards: 1,391
- Rushing average: 4.3
- Rushing touchdowns: 15
- Stats at Pro Football Reference

Marc Anthony Logan (born May 9, 1965) is an American former professional football player who was a running back in the National Football League (NFL). He played college football for the Kentucky Wildcats.

Logan weighs in at 6'0, 217 lbs., and attended the University of Kentucky, wearing number 25. At Kentucky, he enjoyed four very successful seasons, leading his team in receptions in his sophomore, junior and senior years. As a sophomore in the 1985 Hall of Fame Bowl, he scored two touchdowns on just five plays in his MVP performance, setting two NCAA bowl records for the longest kick return (85 yards) as well as the longest play from scrimmage (63 yards). His kickoff return record still stands.

Logan was selected in the fifth round of the 1987 NFL draft by the Cincinnati Bengals. He went on to play eleven years in the NFL from 1987 to 1997 for the Bengals, Miami Dolphins, San Francisco 49ers, and Washington Redskins. After playing for the Bengals during the 1987 NFL Players Strike, he joined the Cleveland Browns late in the season, but saw no playing time before being released. Throughout his career, Logan rushed for 1,391 yards on 325 carries, averaging 4.4 yards per carry with 15 touchdowns. He also had 123 receptions for 1,135 yards, averaging 9.2 yards per reception with 3 touchdowns. He added 1,830 yards on 89 returns, averaging 20.6 yards, with 1 touchdown. Logan played in Super Bowl XXIII for the Bengals and was a part of the Super Bowl XXIX winning San Francisco 49ers.
