= Nate Singleton =

American football player (born 1968)

No. 88, 87
- Position: Wide receiver

Personal information
- Born: July 5, 1968 (age 58); New Orleans, Louisiana. U.S.
- Listed height: 5 ft 11 in (1.80 m)
- Listed weight: 190 lb (86 kg)

Career information
- High school: L. W. Higgins (Marrero, Louisiana)
- College: Grambling State
- NFL draft: 1992: 11th round, 292nd overall pick

Career history
- New York Giants (1992)*; San Francisco 49ers (1993–1996); Philadelphia Eagles (1997)*; Tennessee Oilers (1997); Baltimore Ravens (1997)
- * Offseason or practice squad member only

Awards and highlights
- Super Bowl champion (XXIX)

Career NFL statistics
- Receptions: 38
- Receiving yards: 539
- Receiving touchdowns: 4
- Stats at Pro Football Reference

Nathaniel Singleton III (born July 5, 1968) is an American former professional football player who was a wide receiver in the National Football League (NFL). He played college football for the Grambling State Tigers and was selected by the New York Giants in the 11th round of the 1992 NFL draft with the 292nd overall pick. He played five seasons for the San Francisco 49ers (1993–1996) and the Baltimore Ravens (1997).
