= 1995 Philadelphia Eagles season =

NFL team season

- Owner: Jeffrey Lurie
- Head coach: Ray Rhodes
- Offensive coordinator: Jon Gruden
- Defensive coordinator: Emmitt Thomas
- Home stadium: Veterans Stadium

Results
- Record: 10–6
- Division place: 2nd NFC East
- Playoffs: Won Wild Card Playoffs (vs. Lions) 58–37; Lost Divisional Playoffs (at Cowboys) 11–30

Uniform
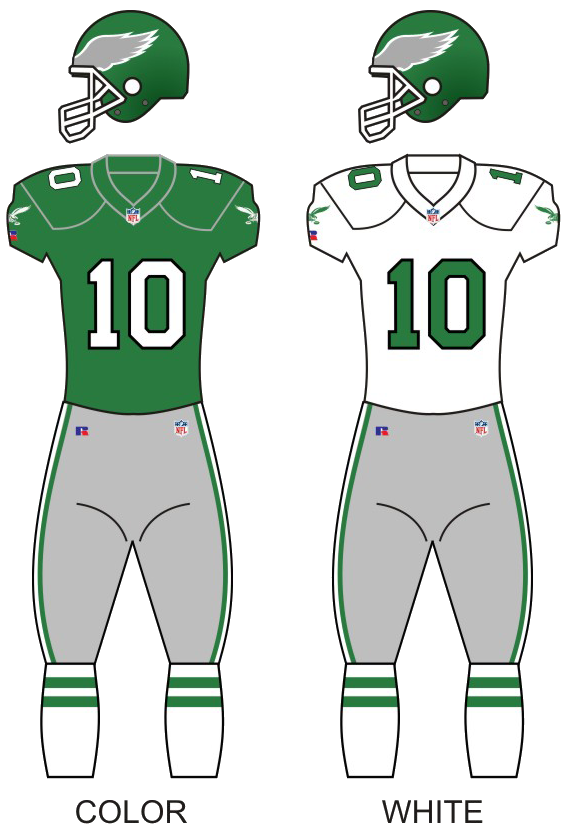

The 1995 Philadelphia Eagles season was the team's 63rd in the National Football League (NFL). The team improved upon their previous output of 7–9, going 10–6 under new head coach Ray Rhodes and qualifying for the playoffs for the first time in three seasons. They lost to the Cowboys in the Divisional round, the second time in four years.

Ricky Watters, signed as a free agent from the Super Bowl champion 49ers, came up short on a pass over the middle in the Eagles' season-opening 21–6 home loss to Tampa Bay. Following the contest, when asked why he did not commit to catching the ball and taking a hit, he replied "For who? For what?"

Three weeks later, the Eagles were beaten by 31 points against the Raiders in Oakland. However, the team then won four straight and seven of their next eight to get back in the playoff hunt.

On a frigid December 10 at the Vet against the Cowboys, the Eagles defense twice stopped Emmitt Smith on 4th-and-1 in Dallas territory late in the fourth quarter of a 17–17 tie. The change of possession resulted in the game-winning field goal from Gary Anderson. A win over Arizona the next week clinched a playoff berth, but a loss against the Bears in Chicago in the season finale on Christmas Eve torpedoed any hopes of an NFC East crown, leaving the Eagles locked into the #4 seed in the NFC.

The 1995 season marked the final year of the 1990s that the Eagles donned their trademark Kelly green uniforms. They were worn for one game in 2010 and would not be worn again after that until 2023.

It was the final season with the Eagles for quarterback Randall Cunningham, who retired following the season before joining the Minnesota Vikings for the 1997 season.

== Off season ==
The Eagles' training camp was held for 16th and final year at West Chester University's John A. Farrell Stadium in West Chester, Pennsylvania. The camp was about 20 miles from their home stadium in South Philadelphia. In 1996, the Eagles moved their training camp to Lehigh University in Bethlehem, Pennsylvania, about 50 miles north of Philadelphia.

=== NFL draft ===
The 1995 NFL draft was held April 22–23, 1995. The league also held a supplemental draft after the regular draft and before the regular season.

With a 7–9 record in 1994, and tying with four other teams, the Eagles rotated picking between the 8th pick to the 12th pick in the seven rounds. They chose eight players in the five rounds they had picks. The Eagles made a trade with the Tampa Bay Buccaneers, for draft picks to move from 12th to 7th on the first round. With their first pick in the draft, acquired from Tampa Bay, the Eagles chose Mike Mamula, a defensive end out of Boston College.

The table shows the Eagles selections and what picks they had that were traded away and the team that ended up with that pick. It is possible the Eagles' pick ended up with this team via another team that the Eagles made a trade with. Not shown are acquired picks that the Eagles traded away.

= Pro Bowler	= Hall of Famer

Rd	PICK	PLAYER	POS	COLLEGE
1	7	Mike Mamula _{Pick Acquired from Tampa Bay Buccaneers}	Defensive End	Boston College
1	12	_{Pick Traded to Tampa Bay Buccaneers}		
2	50	Bobby Taylor	Cornerback	Notre Dame
2	58	Barrett Brooks	Offensive Tackle	Kansas State
3	72	Greg Jefferson	Defensive end	Central Florida
3	78	Chris T. Jones	Wide receiver	Miami (FL)
4	119	Dave Barr	Quarterback	California
5		_{pick Made by Detroit Lions}		
6		_{Pick Made by Tampa Bay Buccaneers}		
7	210	Kevin Bouie _{Pick Acquired from Jacksonville Jaguars}	Running back	Mississippi State
7	248	Howard Smothers	Offensive Tackle	Bethune-Cookman

=== Undrafted free agents ===
1995 undrafted free agents of note
Player	Position	College
Andre Allen	Linebacker	Northern Iowa

== Staff ==
1995 Philadelphia Eagles staff
Front office: Owner – Jeffrey Lurie; Vice-president – Joe Banner; Director of football administration – Bob Ackles; Director of college scouting – John Wooten; Director of pro personnel – Chuck Banker; Head coaches: Head coach – Ray Rhodes; Offensive coaches: Offensive coordinator – Jon Gruden; Running backs – Dick Jamieson; Wide receivers – Gerald Carr; Tight ends – Ted Williams; Offensive line – Bill Callahan; Offensive assistant – Juan Castillo	Defensive coaches: Defensive coordinator – Emmitt Thomas; Defensive line – Mike Trgovac; Linebackers – Joe Vitt; Defensive assistant – Chuck Knox Jr.; Special teams coaches: Special teams – Danny Smith; Strength and conditioning: Strength and conditioning – Mike Wolf; Assistant strength and conditioning – Paul Ricci; Assistant strength and conditioning – Tom Kanavy; Part-time strength and conditioning – Martin Streight

== Roster ==
1995 Philadelphia Eagles roster
Quarterbacks (QB): 12 Randall Cunningham; 11 Jay Fiedler; 9 Rodney Peete; Running backs (RB): 30 Charlie Garner KR; 41 Fred McCrary FB; 22 James Saxon; 32 Ricky Watters; 31 Derrick Witherspoon KR; Wide receivers (WR): 86 Fred Barnett; 81 Rob Carpenter PR; 82 Chris T. Jones; 83 Art Monk; 17 Freddie Solomon; 89 Calvin Williams; Tight ends (TE): 87 Rickey Brady; 88 Jimmie Johnson; 80 Reggie Johnson; 83 Ed West	Offensive linemen (OL): 69 Harry Boatswain G; 76 Barrett Brooks T; 68 Frank Cornish C; 78 Antone Davis T; 65 Mo Elewonibi T; 62 Guy McIntyre G; 63 Raleigh McKenzie C; Defensive linemen (DL): 71 Mike Chalenski DE; 90 Ronnie Dixon DT; 95 William Fuller DE; 96 Mark Gunn DT; 91 Andy Harmon DT; 97 Rhett Hall DT; 94 Kevin Johnson DT; 59 Mike Mamula DE; 93 Danny Stubbs DE	Linebackers (LB): 54 Kurt Gouveia MLB; 58 Derrick Oden MLB; 53 Bill Romanowski OLB; 51 William Thomas OLB; 50 James Willis MLB; 57 Marc Woodard OLB; 52 Sylvester Wright OLB; Defensive backs (DB): 23 Derrick Frazier CB; 26 Jerome Henderson CB/S; 47 Greg Jackson FS; 29 Mark McMillian CB; 21 Bobby Taylor CB; 42 David Whitmore FS; 45 Barry Wilburn CB/S; 27 Eric Zomalt SS; 36 Mike Zordich SS; Special teams (ST): 1 Gary Anderson K; 66 John Hudson LS; 4 Tom Hutton P	Practice squad: 55 Nate Dingle LB; 75 Troy Drake T; 67 Alai Kalaniuvalu G; 64 Joe Rudolph G; 77 Howard Smothers T; Reserve: 35 Kevin Bouie RB (IR); 20 Vaughn Hebron RB (IR); 73 Lester Holmes T (IR); 79 Greg Jefferson DE (IR); 98 Tommy Jeter DT (IR); 84 Kelvin Martin WR (IR); 72 Joe Panos G (IR); 34 Kevin Turner RB (IR); 74 Bernard Williams T (Susp.); 53 active, 9 inactive, 5 practice squad Rookies in italics

== Regular season ==
=== Schedule ===
Week	Date	Opponent	Result	Record	Attendance	TV Time
1	September 3, 1995	Tampa Bay Buccaneers	**L** 6–21	0–1	66,266	FOX 1:00ET
2	September 10, 1995	at **Arizona Cardinals**	**W** 31–19	1–1	45,004	TNT 8:00ET
3	September 17, 1995	San Diego Chargers	**L** 21–27	1–2	63,081	NBC 1:00ET
4	September 24, 1995	at Oakland Raiders	**L** 17–48	1–3	48,875	FOX 4:00ET
5	October 1, 1995	at New Orleans Saints	**W** 15–10	2–3	43,938	FOX 1:00ET
6	October 8, 1995	**Washington Redskins**	**W** 37–34 (OT)	3–3	65,498	FOX 1:00ET
7	October 15, 1995	at **New York Giants**	**W** 17–14	4–3	74,252	FOX 1:00ET
8	Bye					
9	October 29, 1995	St. Louis Rams	**W** 20–9	5–3	62,172	FOX 1:00ET
10	November 6, 1995	at **Dallas Cowboys**	**L** 12–34	5–4	64,876	ABC 9:00ET
11	November 12, 1995	Denver Broncos	**W** 31–13	6–4	60,842	ESPN 8:00ET
12	November 19, 1995	**New York Giants**	**W** 28–19	7–4	63,562	FOX 1:00ET
13	November 26, 1995	at **Washington Redskins**	**W** 14–7	8–4	50,539	FOX 1:00ET
14	December 3, 1995	at Seattle Seahawks	**L** 14–26	8–5	39,893	FOX 4:00ET
15	December 10, 1995	**Dallas Cowboys**	**W** 20–17	9–5	66,198	FOX 1:00ET
16	December 17, 1995	**Arizona Cardinals**	**W** 21–20	10–5	62,076	FOX 1:00ET
17	December 24, 1995	at Chicago Bears	**L** 14–20	10–6	52,391	FOX 1:00ET

Note: Intra-division opponents are in bold text.

=== Game summaries ===
==== Week 15 ====
Team	1	2	3	4	Total
Cowboys	7	10	0	0	17
• Eagles	3	3	8	6	20

- Date: December 10
- Location: Veterans Stadium, Philadelphia, PA
- Game start: 1:00 p.m. EST
- Game weather: 23 °F (−5 °C); wind 18 mph (29 km/h)
- Referee: Ed Hochuli
- TV announcers (Fox): Pat Summerall and John Madden

Scoring summary
Q1	PHI	Anderson 42 yard field goal	PHI 3–0
Q1	DAL	Smith 10 yard run (Boniol kick)	DAL 7–3
Q2	DAL	Boniol 21 yard field goal	DAL 10–3
Q2	DAL	Brown 65 yard interception return (Boniol kick)	DAL 17–3
Q2	PHI	Anderson 27 yard field goal	DAL 17–6
Q3	PHI	Watters 1 yard run (Barnett pass from Peete)	DAL 17–14
Q4	PHI	Anderson 38 yard field goal	Tie 17–17
Q4	PHI	Anderson 42 yard field goal	PHI 20–17

NFL Network selected this game as the #5 Moment at Home in Eagles' history.

The game is known in Philadelphia as the "Groundhog Day" game. When the Cowboys did not make a first down on their second attempt at 4th and 1 from their own 29-yard line with less than two minutes left in the fourth quarter, Philadelphia radio announcer Merrill Reese exclaimed: "They give it to Smith and they stop him again! They stop him again! And this time they can't take it away from the Eagles!"

=== Standings ===
NFC East
	W	L	T	PCT	PF	PA	STK
^{(1)} Dallas Cowboys	12	4	0	.750	435	291	W2
^{(4)} Philadelphia Eagles	10	6	0	.625	318	338	L1
Washington Redskins	6	10	0	.375	326	359	W2
New York Giants	5	11	0	.313	290	340	L2
Arizona Cardinals	4	12	0	.250	275	422	L4

== Postseason ==
=== Schedule ===
Round	Date	Opponent (seed)	Result	Record	Venue	Recap
Wild Card	December 30, 1995	Detroit Lions (5)	W 58–37	1–0	Veterans Stadium	Recap
Divisional	January 7, 1996	at Dallas Cowboys (1)	L 11–30	1–1	Texas Stadium	Recap

=== Game summaries ===
==== NFC Wild Card Playoffs: vs. (5) Detroit Lions ====
NFC Wild Card Playoffs: (5) Detroit Lions at (4) Philadelphia Eagles – Game summary

Quarter	1	2	3	4	Total
Lions	7	0	14	16	37
Eagles	7	31	13	7	58

at Veterans Stadium, Philadelphia

- Date: December 30, 1995
- Game time: 4:00 p.m. EST
- Game weather: 38 °F (3 °C), clear
- Game attendance: 66,099
- Referee: Ron Blum
- TV announcers (ABC): Al Michaels, Frank Gifford, and Dan Dierdorf

Game information

First quarter

- PHI – Charlie Garner 15-yard run (Gary Anderson kick). Eagles 7–0.
- DET – David Sloan 32-yard pass from Scott Mitchell (Jason Hanson kick). Tied 7–7.

Second quarter

- PHI – Gary Anderson 21-yard field goal. Eagles 10–7.
- PHI – Fred Barnett 22-yard pass from Rodney Peete (Gary Anderson kick). Eagles 17–7.
- PHI – Barry Wilburn 24-yard interception return (Gary Anderson kick). Eagles 24–7.
- PHI – Ricky Watters 1-yard run (Gary Anderson kick). Eagles 31–7.
- PHI – Rob Carpenter 43-yard pass from Rodney Peete (Gary Anderson kick). Eagles 38–7.

Third quarter

- PHI – Ricky Watters 45-yard pass from Rodney Peete (Gary Anderson kick). Eagles 45–7.
- PHI – Gary Anderson 31-yard field goal. Eagles 48–7.
- PHI – Gary Anderson 39-yard field goal. Eagles 51–7.
- DET – Herman Moore 68-yard pass from Don Majkowski (Jason Hanson kick). Eagles 51–14.
- DET – Johnnie Morton 7-yard pass from Don Majkowski (Jason Hanson kick). Eagles 51–21.

Fourth quarter

- PHI – William Thomas 30-yard interception return (Gary Anderson kick). Eagles 58–21.
- DET – David Sloan 2-yard pass from Don Majkowski (Ron Rivers run). Eagles 58–29.
- DET – Ron Rivers 1-yard run (Herman Moore pass from Don Majkowski). Eagles 58–37.

Top passers

- DET – Don Majkowski – 14/23, 206 yards, 3 TD, 2 INT
- PHI – Rodney Peete – 17/25, 270 yards, 3 TD

Top rushers

- DET – Barry Sanders – 10 rushes, 40 yards
- PHI – Charlie Garner – 12 rushes, 78 yards, 1 TD

Top receivers

- DET – Herman Moore – 7 receptions, 133 yards, 1 TD
- PHI – Fred Barnett – 8 receptions, 109 yards, 1 TD

==== NFC Divisional Playoffs: at (1) Dallas Cowboys ====
NFC Divisional Playoffs: (4) Philadelphia Eagles at (1) Dallas Cowboys – Game summary

Quarter	1	2	3	4	Total
Eagles	0	3	0	8	11
Cowboys	3	14	6	7	30

at Texas Stadium, Irving, Texas

- Date: January 7, 1996
- Game time: 12:30 p.m. EST/11:30 a.m. CST
- Game weather: 32 °F (0 °C), clear
- Game attendance: 64,371
- Referee: Gerald Austin
- TV announcers (Fox): Pat Summerall and John Madden

Game information

First quarter

- DAL – Chris Boniol 24-yard field goal. Cowboys 3–0.

Second quarter

- PHI – Gary Anderson 26-yard field goal. Tied 3–3.
- DAL – Deion Sanders 21-yard run (Chris Boniol kick). Cowboys 10–3.
- DAL – Emmitt Smith 1-yard run (Chris Boniol kick). Cowboys 17–3.

Third quarter

- DAL – Chris Boniol 18-yard field goal. Cowboys 20–3.
- DAL – Chris Boniol 51-yard field goal. Cowboys 23–3.

Fourth quarter

- DAL – Michael Irvin 9-yard pass from Troy Aikman (Chris Boniol kick). Cowboys 30–3.
- PHI – Randall Cunningham 4-yard run (Reggie Johnson pass from Randall Cunningham). Cowboys 30–11.

Top passers

- PHI – Randall Cunningham – 11/26, 161 yards, INT
- DAL – Troy Aikman – 17/24, 253 yards, TD, INT

Top rushers

- PHI – Ricky Watters – 13 rushes, 39 yards
- DAL – Emmitt Smith – 21 rushes, 99 yards, TD

Top receivers

- PHI – Calvin Williams – 5 receptions, 56 yards
- DAL – Kevin Williams – 6 receptions, 124 yards
