= 1996 Philadelphia Eagles season =

NFL team season

- Owner: Jeffrey Lurie
- Head coach: Ray Rhodes
- Offensive coordinator: Jon Gruden
- Defensive coordinator: Emmitt Thomas
- Home stadium: Veterans Stadium

Results
- Record: 10–6
- Division place: 2nd NFC East
- Playoffs: Lost Wild Card Playoffs (at 49ers) 0–14
- Pro Bowlers: RB Ricky Watters; WR Irving Fryar; DE William Fuller

The 1996 season was the Philadelphia Eagles' sixty-fourth in the National Football League (NFL). The team matched its 10–6 record from the previous season and qualified for the playoffs for the second year in a row.

== Background ==
After a season-ending injury to Rodney Peete, Ty Detmer took over the starting role. For the second time in three seasons, the Eagles stood at 7–2 at the nine-game mark, thanks to a fan-thrilling win November 3 on the road against Dallas. The cap to that contest was a combined 104-yard interception return between James Willis and Troy Vincent during the game's final moments, which turned a potential game-winning drive by the Cowboys into a Philadelphia victory.

But, as it did in 1994 under Rich Kotite, the team wilted. This time, after piling up four losses in five games, including an embarrassing 27-point setback on national TV at Indianapolis, the team scrambled in the playoff picture. Wins against the Jets and Cardinals managed to right the ship, however, resulting in a wild-card matchup with the San Francisco 49ers. Despite that success, the Eagles' season ended in San Francisco with a 14–0 first-round loss to the 49ers.

The 1996 season was also the first season the Eagles debuted the midnight green, white, and black look, with new helmet designs and the logo and endzone font as well.

== Offseason ==
The Eagles held training camp for the first year at Lehigh University in Bethlehem, Pennsylvania, home of the Lehigh Mountain Hawks.

The Eagles signed college free agent Hollis Thomas, a defensive tackle out of Northern Illinois, and also signed former Miami Dolphins cornerback Troy Vincent as a free agent.

Veteran San Francisco 49ers offensive tackle Steve Wallace was signed via free agency to a one-year contract, but after a poor showing in the preseason was cut at the end of training camp and promptly re-signed by the 49ers.

=== NFL draft ===
The 1996 NFL draft was held April 20–21, 1996. No teams elected to claim any players in the supplemental draft that year.

With a 10–6 record in 1995, and tying with two other teams, the Eagles rotated picking between the twenty-third pick to the twenty-fifth pick during the seven-round draft and chose eight players in the six rounds in which it had picks. During its first pick, the Eagles chose Jermane Mayberry, an offensive tackle from Texas A&M-Kingsville.

The table below shows the Eagles selections, what picks it had that were traded away, and the teams that ended up with those picks. (It is possible that Eagles' picks ended up with those team via trades made by the Eagles with other teams.)

1996 Philadelphia Eagles draft
Round	Pick	Player	Position	College	Notes
1	25	Jermane Mayberry *	OT	Texas A&M-Kingsville	
2	54	Jason Dunn	TE	Eastern Kentucky	
2	61	Brian Dawkins * ^{†}	FS	Clemson	Compensatory pick
3	85	Bobby Hoying	QB	Ohio State	
4	121	Ray Farmer	DB	Duke	
5	147	Whit Marshall	LB	Georgia	
6	194	Steve White	DE	Tennessee	
6	197	Tony Johnson	TE	Alabama	
Made roster † Pro Football Hall of Fame * Made at least one Pro Bowl during career

== Staff ==
1996 Philadelphia Eagles staff
Front office: Owner/Chief Executive Officer – Jeffrey Lurie; Senior Vice President of Administration – Joe Banner; Director of Football Operations – Dick Daniels; Director of College Scouting – John Wooten; Director of Scouting – Chuck Banker; Head coaches: Head Coach – Ray Rhodes; Offensive coaches: Offensive Coordinator – Jon Gruden; Running Backs – Dick Jamieson; Wide Receivers – Gerald Carr; Tight Ends – Ted Williams; Offensive Line – Bill Callahan; Offensive Assistant – Juan Castillo	Defensive coaches: Defensive Coordinator – Emmitt Thomas; Defensive Line – Mike Trgovac; Linebackers – Joe Vitt; Defensive Assistant – Chuck Knox Jr.; Special teams coaches: Special Teams – Danny Smith; Strength and conditioning: Strength and Conditioning – Mike Wolf; Assistant Strength and Conditioning – Tom Kanavy; Part-Time Strength and Conditioning – Martin Streight; Volunteer Strength and Conditioning – Kevin Tolbert

== Roster ==
1996 Philadelphia Eagles roster
Quarterbacks (QB): 14 Ty Detmer; 7 Bobby Hoying; 11 Mark Rypien; Running backs (RB): 30 Charlie Garner; 34 Kevin Turner FB; 29 Adam Walker; 32 Ricky Watters; 31 Derrick Witherspoon KR; Wide receivers (WR): 86 Dialleo Burks; 80 Irving Fryar; 82 Chris T. Jones; 81 Mark Seay PR; 84 Freddie Solomon; 89 Calvin Williams; Tight ends (TE): 87 Jason Dunn; 88 Jimmie Johnson; 83 Ed West	Offensive linemen (OL): 76 Barrett Brooks T; 77 Richard Cooper T; 75 Troy Drake T; 73 Lester Holmes G; 71 Jermane Mayberry T; 62 Guy McIntyre G; 63 Raleigh McKenzie C; 65 Bubba Miller C; 72 Joe Panos G; Defensive linemen (DL): 90 Ronnie Dixon DT; 95 William Fuller DE; 97 Rhett Hall DT; 79 Greg Jefferson DE; 59 Mike Mamula DE; 96 Keith Rucker DT; 98 Michael Samson DT; 78 Hollis Thomas DT	Linebackers (LB): 55 Ray Farmer OLB; 93 Darion Conner OLB; 56 Joe Kelly MLB; 58 Whit Marshall OLB; 51 William Thomas OLB; 50 James Willis MLB; 57 Marc Woodard OLB; 52 Sylvester Wright OLB; Defensive backs (DB): 25 Deral Boykin SS; 20 Brian Dawkins FS; 22 James Fuller FS; 28 Don Griffin CB; 21 Bobby Taylor CB; 42 Johnny Thomas CB; 23 Troy Vincent CB; 36 Mike Zordich SS; Special teams (ST): 1 Gary Anderson K; 4 Tom Hutton P; 68 Morris Unutoa LS	Practice squad: 39 Chris Buckhalter RB; 64 Ben Cavil G; 46 Fred Ford S; 16 Brandon Harrison WR; 27 Thomas McGaughey S; Reserve: 91 Andy Harmon DT (IR); 85 Mark Ingram WR (IR); 9 Rodney Peete QB (IR); 53 active, 3 inactive, 5 practice squad Rookies in italics

== Regular season ==
=== Schedule ===
Week	Date	Opponent	Result	Network	TV Announcers	Kickoff (ET)	Attendance
1	September 1, 1996	at **Washington Redskins**	**W** 17–14	FOX	Pat Summerall & John Madden	1:00pm	53,415
2	September 9, 1996	at Green Bay Packers	**L** 13–39	ABC	Al Michaels, Frank Gifford & Dan Dierdorf	9:00pm	60,666
3	September 15, 1996	Detroit Lions	**W** 24–17	FOX	Dick Stockton & Matt Millen	1:00pm	66,007
4	September 22, 1996	at Atlanta Falcons	**W** 33–18	TNT	Verne Lundquist & Pat Haden	8:00pm	40,107
5	September 30, 1996	**Dallas Cowboys**	**L** 19–23	ABC	Al Michaels, Frank Gifford & Dan Dierdorf	9:00pm	67,201
6	Bye						
7	October 13, 1996	at **New York Giants**	**W** 19–10	FOX	Dick Stockton & Matt Millen	4:00pm	72,729
8	October 20, 1996	Miami Dolphins	**W** 35–28	NBC	Marv Albert & Sam Wyche	1:00pm	66,240
9	October 27, 1996	Carolina Panthers	**W** 20–9	FOX	Kevin Harlan & Jerry Glanville	1:00pm	65,982
10	November 3, 1996	at **Dallas Cowboys**	**W** 31–21	FOX	Pat Summerall & John Madden	1:00pm	64,952
11	November 10, 1996	Buffalo Bills	**L** 17–24	NBC	Charlie Jones & Randy Cross	1:00pm	66,613
12	November 17, 1996	**Washington Redskins**	**L** 21–26	FOX	Pat Summerall & John Madden	1:00pm	66,834
13	November 24, 1996	at **Arizona Cardinals**	**L** 30–36	FOX	Joe Buck & Bill Maas	4:00pm	36,175
14	December 1, 1996	**New York Giants**	**W** 24–0	FOX	Kevin Harlan & Jerry Glanville	1:00pm	51,468
15	December 5, 1996	at Indianapolis Colts	**L** 10–37	ESPN	Mike Patrick & Joe Theismann	8:00pm	52,689
16	December 14, 1996	at New York Jets	**W** 21–20	FOX	Dick Stockton & Matt Millen	12:30pm	29,176
17	December 22, 1996	**Arizona Cardinals**	**W** 29–19	FOX	Kenny Albert & Tim Green	1:00pm	63,658

Note: Intra-division opponents are in bold text.

=== Game summaries ===
==== Week 10 ====
Team	1	2	3	4	Total
• Eagles	7	7	7	10	31
Cowboys	7	3	3	8	21

- Date: November 3
- Location: Texas Stadium, Irving, Texas
- Game start: 12:00 p.m.
- Game attendance: 64,952
- Game weather: 50 °F (10 °C); wind 8 miles per hour (13 km/h; 7.0 kn)
- TV announcers (Fox): Pat Summerall and John Madden

Scoring summary
Q1	DAL	Emmitt Smith 1 yard run (Chris Boniol kick)	DAL 7–0
Q1	PHI	Ricky Watters 5 yard run (Gary Anderson kick)	Tie 7–7
Q2	DAL	Chris Boniol 19 yard field goal	DAL 10–7
Q2	PHI	Ty Detmer 6 yard run (Gary Anderson kick)	PHI 14–10
Q3	DAL	Chris Boniol 37 yard field goal	PHI 14–13
Q3	PHI	Irving Fryar 14 yard pass from Ty Detmer (Gary Anderson kick)	PHI 21–13
Q4	DAL	Emmitt Smith 7 yard run (Eric Bjornson pass from Troy Aikman)	Tie 21–21
Q4	PHI	Gary Anderson 30 yard field goal	PHI 24–21
Q4	PHI	Troy Vincent 90 yard interception return (Gary Anderson kick)	PHI 31–21

=== Standings ===
NFC East
	W	L	T	PCT	PF	PA	STK
^{(3)} Dallas Cowboys	10	6	0	.625	286	250	L1
^{(5)} Philadelphia Eagles	10	6	0	.625	363	341	W2
Washington Redskins	9	7	0	.563	364	312	W1
Arizona Cardinals	7	9	0	.438	300	397	L1
New York Giants	6	10	0	.375	242	297	L2

== Postseason ==
=== Schedule ===
Round	Date	Opponent (seed)	Result	Record	Venue	Recap
Wild Card	December 29, 1996	San Francisco 49ers (4)	L 0–14	0–1	3Com Park	Recap

=== Game summaries ===
==== NFC Wild Card Playoffs: at (4) San Francisco 49ers ====
NFC Wild Card Playoffs: (5) Philadelphia Eagles at (4) San Francisco 49ers – Game summary

Quarter	1	2	3	4	Total
Eagles	0	0	0	0	0
49ers	0	7	7	0	14

at 3Com Park at Candlestick Point, San Francisco, California

- Date: December 29, 1996
- Game time: 4:00 p.m. EST/1:00 p.m. PST
- Game weather: 61 °F (16 °C), rain
- Game attendance: 56,460
- Referee: Walt Coleman
- TV announcers (Fox): Pat Summerall (play-by-play) and John Madden (color commentator)

Game information

First quarter

- No scoring plays

Second quarter

- SF – Steve Young 9-yard run (Jeff Wilkins kick). 49ers 7–0.

Third quarter

- SF – Jerry Rice 3-yard pass from Steve Young (Jeff Wilkins kick). 49ers 14–0.

Fourth quarter

- No scoring plays

Top passers

- PHI – Ty Detmer – 14/21, 148 yards, 2 INT
- SF – Steve Young – 14/21, 161 yards, TD

Top rushers

- PHI – Ricky Watters – 20 rushes, 57 yards
- SF – Steve Young – 11 rushes, 65 yards, TD

Top receivers

- PHI – Irving Fryar – 5 receptions, 62 yards
- SF – Jerry Rice – 4 receptions, 50 yards, TD
