= 1997 Philadelphia Eagles season =

NFL team season

- Owner: Jeffrey Lurie
- Head coach: Ray Rhodes
- Offensive coordinator: Jon Gruden
- Defensive coordinator: Emmitt Thomas
- Home stadium: Veterans Stadium

Results
- Record: 6–9–1
- Division place: 3rd NFC East
- Playoffs: Did not qualify
- Pro Bowlers: WR Irving Fryar

The 1997 Philadelphia Eagles season was the franchise's 65th season in the National Football League. The team failed to improve on their previous output of 10–6, going only 6–9–1 and failing to reach the playoffs for the first time in three seasons. This was the season where the team was sponsored by the "Starters" brand.

Lowlights of the 1997 campaign include a disheartening one-point loss at Dallas in week 3, where starter Ty Detmer led the Birds on a potential game-winning drive late in regulation, only to see holder Tommy Hutton botch the hold on what would have been the deciding field goal from ex-Cowboys kicker Chris Boniol. In Week 7, the Eagles lost their first-ever game against the three-season-old Jacksonville Jaguars, and on November 10, in a Monday Night Football 24–12 home loss against San Francisco, a fan was spotted firing a flare gun in the upper deck. Six days later, at Memorial Stadium, the Eagles and Ravens engaged in a 10–10 tie. This was Eagles' first tie since 1986 against the Cardinals.

One bright spot during the year came on the Sunday after Thanksgiving, when second-year Bobby Hoying stepped in under center and threw for a career-high 313 yards and four touchdowns in a 44–42 win against the Cincinnati Bengals.

The 1997 campaign was notable in that it ended a 13-year radio partnership between broadcasters Merrill Reese and former Eagle Stan Walters on 94 WIP. Mike Quick became the color commentator the following season.

== Offseason ==
=== NFL draft ===
1997 Philadelphia Eagles draft
Round	Selection	Player	Position	College
1	25	Jon Harris	DE	Virginia
2	57	James Darling	LB	Washington State
3	71	Duce Staley	RB	South Carolina
4	119	Damien Robinson	FS	Iowa
5	152	N. D. Kalu	DE	Rice
5	155	Luther Broughton	TE	Furman
6	190	Antwuan Wyatt	WR	Bethune-Cookman
6	198	Ed Jasper	DT	Texas A&M
7	207	Koy Detmer	QB	Colorado
7	225	Byron Capers	DB	Florida State
7	227	Deauntae Brown	DB	Central State (OH)

== Staff ==
1997 Philadelphia Eagles staff
Front office: Owner/chief executive officer – Jeffrey Lurie; Executive vice-president – Joe Banner; Director of football operations – Dick Daniels; Head coaches: Head coach – Ray Rhodes; Offensive coaches: Offensive coordinator – Jon Gruden; Quarterbacks – Sean Payton; Running backs – Ted Williams; Wide receivers – Gerald Carr; Tight ends – Juan Castillo; Offensive line – Bill Callahan; Quality control – David Shaw	Defensive coaches: Defensive coordinator – Emmitt Thomas; Defensive line – Mike Trgovac; Linebackers – Joe Vitt; Defensive backs – Danny Smith; Defensive assistant – Chuck Knox Jr.; Special teams coaches: Special teams – Joe Wessel; Strength and conditioning: Strength and conditioning – Mike Wolf; Assistant strength and conditioning – Tom Kanavy; Volunteer strength and conditioning – Kevin Tolbert

== Roster ==
1997 Philadelphia Eagles roster
Quarterbacks (QB): 14 Ty Detmer; 7 Bobby Hoying; 9 Rodney Peete; Running backs (RB): 30 Charlie Garner; 28 Mel Gray PR; 22 Duce Staley KR; 34 Kevin Turner FB; 32 Ricky Watters; Wide receivers (WR): 86 Russell Copeland; 80 Irving Fryar; 82 Chris T. Jones; 84 Freddie Solomon PR; 83 Michael Timpson; Tight ends (TE): 87 Jason Dunn; 88 Jimmie Johnson; 89 Chad Lewis	Offensive linemen (OL): 62 Ian Beckles G; 76 Barrett Brooks T; 73 Jerry Crafts G; 75 Troy Drake T; 61 Steve Everitt C; 64 Sean Love G; 71 Jermane Mayberry T; 65 Bubba Miller C/G; 72 Joe Panos G; Defensive linemen (DL): 95 Richard Dent DE; 97 Rhett Hall DT; 90 Jon Harris DE; 74 Ed Jasper DT; 79 Greg Jefferson DE; 98 Jimmie Jones DT; 53 N. D. Kalu DE; 59 Mike Mamula DE; 78 Hollis Thomas DT; 96 Al Wallace DE	Linebackers (LB): 93 Darion Conner OLB; 57 James Darling OLB; 55 Ray Farmer OLB; 58 DeShawn Fogle OLB; 54 Jeff Herrod MLB; 51 William Thomas OLB; 50 James Willis MLB; Defensive backs (DB): 25 Willie Clark CB; 20 Brian Dawkins FS; 38 Charles Dimry CB; 43 Randy Kinder CB; 24 Tim McTyer CB; 45 Matt Stevens SS; 23 Troy Vincent CB; 36 Mike Zordich SS; Special teams (ST): 18 Chris Boniol K; 4 Tom Hutton P; 68 Morris Unutoa LS	Practice squad: 63 Patrick Augafa C; 26 Anthony Rice CB; Reserve: 77 Richard Cooper T (IR); 10 Koy Detmer QB (IR); 47 Charles Emanuel S (IR); 46 Fred Ford CB (IR); 48 Andre President TE (IR); 56 Darrin Smith LB (IR); 21 Bobby Taylor CB (IR); 39 Corey Walker RB (IR); 85 Antwuan Wyatt WR (IR); 53 active, 9 inactive, 2 practice squad Rookies in italics

== Regular season ==
=== Schedule ===
Week	Date	Opponent	Result	Record	Attendance
1	August 31, 1997	at **New York Giants**	**L** 31–17	0–1	77,344
2	September 7, 1997	Green Bay Packers	**W** 10–9	1–1	66,803
3	September 15, 1997	at **Dallas Cowboys**	**L** 21–20	1–2	63,942
4	Bye				
5	September 28, 1997	at Minnesota Vikings	**L** 28–19	1–3	55,149
6	October 5, 1997	**Washington Redskins**	**W** 24–10	2–3	67,008
7	October 12, 1997	at Jacksonville Jaguars	**L** 38–21	2–4	69,150
8	October 19, 1997	**Arizona Cardinals**	**W** 13–10 (OT)	3–4	66,860
9	October 26, 1997	**Dallas Cowboys**	**W** 13–12	4–4	67,106
10	November 2, 1997	at **Arizona Cardinals**	**L** 31–21	4–5	39,549
11	November 10, 1997	San Francisco 49ers	**L** 24–12	4–6	67,133
12	November 16, 1997	at Baltimore Ravens	**T** 10–10 (OT)	4–6–1	63,546
13	November 23, 1997	Pittsburgh Steelers	**W** 23–20	5–6–1	67,166
14	November 30, 1997	Cincinnati Bengals	**W** 44–42	6–6–1	66,623
15	December 7, 1997	**New York Giants**	**L** 31–21	6–7–1	67,084
16	December 14, 1997	at Atlanta Falcons	**L** 20–17	6–8–1	42,866
17	December 21, 1997	at **Washington Redskins**	**L** 35–32	6–9–1	75,939

Note: Intra-division opponents are in bold text.

=== Standings ===
NFC East
	W	L	T	PCT	PF	PA	STK
^{(3)} New York Giants	10	5	1	.656	307	265	W3
Washington Redskins	8	7	1	.531	327	289	W1
Philadelphia Eagles	6	9	1	.406	317	372	L3
Dallas Cowboys	6	10	0	.375	304	314	L5
Arizona Cardinals	4	12	0	.250	283	379	W1
