= Kalani Witherspoon =

American athlete

Kalani Witherspoon (born 15 February 2005) is a track athlete-sprinter at the University of North Carolina at Chapel Hill. She is the daughter of Derrick Witherspoon, a retired professional American football player with the National Football League (NFL).

== Early life and education ==
Witherspoon is a 2023 graduate of Carrollton High School in Carrollton, Georgia, where she was both a gymnast and a sprinter. In 2023, Witherspoon was the Georgia High School Association champion in the 100 meter hurdles event. In 2022, as a high school junior, she was runner-up in the state for 100 meter hurdles She still holds the record for 100 meter hurdles and the 400 meter hurdles at Carrollton High School. In 2023, she placed first in the 100 meter hurdles with a time of 14.73 seconds.

In 2022, as a gymnast, she won first place in the Georgia High School Association (GHSA) State 7A Gymnastics Championships. The Philadelphia Inquirer wrote an article highlighting the connection of Kalani Witherspoon and her father, Derrick Witherspoon when she competed in the New Balance Nationals

== Collegiate career ==
She is currently a sprinter at the University of North Carolina She finished 16th overall in the 100 meter hurdles at the Raleigh Relays in January 2024.

2024: Witherspoon competed in four indoor meets in the 60m hurdles, achieving a third-place finish in her collegiate debut at the Doc Hale VT Meet. Recorded a season-best time of 8.50 seconds at the Virginia Tech Challenge and qualified for the ACC Indoor Championships in the 60m hurdles. During the outdoor season, participated in five meets, competing in the 100m hurdles, 200m hurdles, 4x100m relay, and 4x400m relay.

2025: Witherspoon placed 3rd in the 60m hurdles at the ACC Indoor Championships with a personal best of 8:28.

== Personal life ==
Witherspoon is the daughter of Kolowa and Derrick Witherspoon. Her father, Derrick Witherspoon played football and ran track at Clemson University (1990-1993) and played American football professionally for the Philadelphia Eagles (1995-1997). She became a member of Alpha Kappa Alpha sorority, Theta Pi Chapter at UNC Chapel Hill on November 23, 2025.
