= Brian Dawkins =

American football player (born 1973)

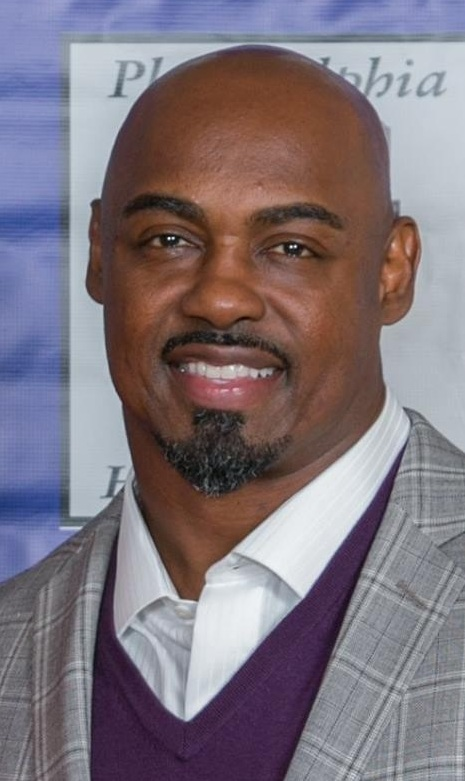
- Dawkins in 2018

No. 20
- Position: Safety

Personal information
- Born: October 13, 1973 (age 53); Jacksonville, Florida, U.S.
- Listed height: 6 ft 0 in (1.83 m)
- Listed weight: 210 lb (95 kg)

Career information
- High school: William M. Raines (Jacksonville)
- College: Clemson (1992–1995)
- NFL draft: 1996: 2nd round, 61st overall pick

Career history

Playing
- Philadelphia Eagles (1996–2008); Denver Broncos (2009–2011)

Operations
- Philadelphia Eagles (2016–2017) Executive of football operations for player development

Awards and highlights
- As a player: 4× First-team All-Pro (2001, 2002, 2004, 2006); Second-team All-Pro (2009); 9× Pro Bowl (1999, 2001, 2002, 2004–2006, 2008, 2009, 2011); NFL 2000s All-Decade Team; NFLPA Alan Page Community Award (2009); PFWA NFL All-Rookie Team (1996); Philadelphia Eagles Hall of Fame; Philadelphia Eagles 75th Anniversary Team; Philadelphia Eagles No. 20 retired; Second-team All-American (1995); First-team All-ACC (1995); 2× Second-team All-ACC (1993, 1994); As an administrator: Super Bowl champion (LII)

Career NFL statistics
- Total tackles: 1,147
- Sacks: 26.0
- Forced fumbles: 39
- Fumble recoveries: 19
- Passes defended: 153
- Interceptions: 37
- Defensive touchdowns: 3
- Stats at Pro Football Reference
- Pro Football Hall of Fame

Brian Patrick Dawkins Sr. (born October 13, 1973), nicknamed "Weapon X", is an American former professional football safety who played in the National Football League (NFL) for 16 seasons, primarily with the Philadelphia Eagles. He played college football for the Clemson Tigers and was selected by the Eagles in the second round of the 1996 NFL draft. In his last three seasons, he played for the Denver Broncos.

Regarded as one of the greatest safeties of all time, Dawkins was viewed as the leader of the Eagles defense, named to nine Pro Bowls and five All-Pro teams. He also made an appearance in Super Bowl XXXIX. In addition to his playing career, Dawkins served the Eagles as an executive of football operations for player development from 2016 to 2018 and was with the organization when they won Super Bowl LII. He was inducted to the Pro Football Hall of Fame in 2018.

== Early life and college ==
Dawkins graduated from William M. Raines High School in Jacksonville, Florida in 1992. He played both football and basketball in high school, and helped lead the basketball team to a Class 3A championship. Dawkins was not highly recruited out of high school, but received a scholarship offer from Clemson University at the request of his high school teammate, Patrick Sapp.

Dawkins was a three-year starter at defensive back for the Clemson Tigers football team, finishing his career with 247 tackles and 11 interceptions. He received first-team All-ACC Honors in 1995 and was selected by the Associated Press and Sporting News as a second-team All-American as a senior when his team-high six interceptions tied him for the conference lead. He was named the first-team strong safety on Clemson's all-centennial team in 1996 and was selected to their Athletic Hall of Fame in 2009. On January 11, 2013, Clemson University established the Brian Dawkins Lifetime Achievement Award to annually honor a former Clemson player for their performance on the field, contributions in leadership and community service.

== Professional career ==
Pre-draft measurables
Height	Weight	Arm length	Hand span	40-yard dash	10-yard split	20-yard split	20-yard shuttle	Vertical jump	Broad jump	Bench press
5 ft 11 3/8 in (1.81 m)	189 lb (86 kg)	31 3/8 in (0.80 m)	9 in (0.23 m)	4.61 s	1.61 s	2.74 s	4.39 s	35 in (0.89 m)	10 ft 0 in (3.05 m)	19 reps
All values from NFL Combine

=== Philadelphia Eagles ===
The Philadelphia Eagles selected Dawkins in the second round (61st overall) of the 1996 NFL draft. Dawkins was the fifth safety drafted in 1996. The Philadelphia Eagles drafted Dawkins using a compensatory pick they received from the departure of Seth Joyner in free agency in 1994.

==== 1996 ====
On July 16, 1996, the Philadelphia Eagles signed Dawkins to a four-year, $1.27 million rookie contract that included a signing bonus of $443,000.

"He just took over the combine. You would've thought he was the captain of the DBs at the workout. He was ahead of everybody. He was doing everything. Which is the same thing I saw at Clemson."

— John Wooten
Philadelphia Eagles' Director of Scouting (1996)

Dawkins entered training camp slated as the backup free safety behind Eric Zomalt who earned the starting role after Greg Jackson departed in free agency. Head coach Ray Rhodes named Dawkins the backup free safety to start the regular season, behind Eric Zomalt.

He made his professional regular-season debut in the Philadelphia Eagles' season-opener at the Washington Redskins and made one tackle in their 17–14 victory. The following week, Dawkins earned his first career start and collected a season-high 11 combined tackles during a 39–13 loss at the Green Bay Packers in week 2. On September 18, 1996, head coach Ray Rhodes officially named Dawkins the starting free safety, alongside strong safety Mike Zordich, after he surpassed Eric Zomalt on the depth chart. Zomalt was subsequently released the following day. On September 22, 1996, Dawkins recorded four combined tackles and made his first career interception during a 33–18 win at the Atlanta Falcons in week 4. Dawkins made his first career interception off a pass by Falcons' backup quarterback Bobby Hebert, that was originally intended for wide receiver Bert Emanuel, and returned it for a 30-yard gain to seal the Eagles' victory in the fourth quarter. In week 5, he recorded eight combined tackles, forced a fumble, and made his first career sack in the Eagles' 23–19 loss to the Dallas Cowboys. Dawkins made his first career sack on Cowboys' quarterback Troy Aikman during the third quarter and also stripped the ball during the play. The ball was recovered by Dawkins' teammate Rhett Hall and returned for a 32-yard touchdown. He finished his rookie season in 1996 with 75 combined tackles, three interceptions, a sack, and a forced fumble in 14 games and 13 starts. The Philadelphia Eagles' defense ranked 21st in the league overall, but allowed the sixth-fewest passing yards (2,979 yards) in 1996.

The Philadelphia Eagles finished second in the NFC East with a 10–6 record and earned a wildcard berth. On December 29, 1996, Dawkins started in his first career playoff game and recorded six combined tackles as they lost 14–0 to the San Francisco 49ers in the NFC Wild Card Game.

==== 1997 ====
Defensive coordinator Emmitt Thomas retained Dawkins and Mike Zordich as the starting safeties in 1997, along with cornerbacks Troy Vincent and Bobby Taylor.

External videos
- NFL Films Encore: Brian Dawkins

On September 28, 1997, he collected a season-high eight combined tackles during a 28–19 loss at the Minnesota Vikings in week 5. Dawkins was inactive for a week 8 victory against the Arizona Cardinals due to an injury. On December 7, 1997, Dawkins recorded seven combined tackles and returned an interception for his first career touchdown during the Eagles' 32–21 loss to the New York Giants in week 15. Dawkins intercepted a pass by quarterback Danny Kanell, that was initially thrown to wide receiver Chris Calloway, and returned it for a 64-yard touchdown in the third quarter. He finished the 1997 season with 75 combined tackles, three interceptions, and a touchdown in 15 games and 15 starts. The Eagles' defense finished ranked 24th overall, but allowed the seventh-fewest passing yards (2,923 yards) in 1997.

==== 1998 ====
Head coach Ray Rhodes elected to retain the starting secondary for the second consecutive season. On December 7, 1998, Dawkins collected a season-high eight combined tackles and forced a fumble during a 31–21 loss to the New York Giants in week 15. Dawkins was sidelined for two games (Weeks 7–9) due to an injury. Dawkins finished the 1998 season with 55 combined tackles, two interceptions, a sack, and a forced fumble in 14 games and 14 starts. On December 28, 1998, the Philadelphia Eagles fired head coach Ray Rhodes after they finished with a 3–13 record in 1998.

==== 1999 ====
On July 16, 1999, the Philadelphia Eagles signed Dawkins to a three-year, $1.27 million contract.

"He's the hardest hitter on the team. He hits like a linebacker. He hurts people. He's knocked them out. He's knocked himself out. Shoot, he's knocked us out."

— Jeremiah Trotter
former Philadelphia Eagles' linebacker

Head coach Andy Reid named Dawkins the starting free safety to begin the regular season, alongside strong safety Tim Hauck. In week 3, he made six combined tackles, forced a fumble, and made an interception during a 26–0 loss at the Buffalo Bills. Dawkins intercepted a pass by quarterback Doug Flutie, that was originally intended for wide receiver Peerless Price, in the second quarter. His performance was his third consecutive game with an interception. In week 9, he collected a season-high eight combined tackles in the Eagles' 33–7 loss at the Carolina Panthers. He finished the 1999 season with 73 combined tackles, six forced fumbles, four interceptions, 1.5 sacks, and a touchdown in 14 games and 14 starts. Dawkins flourished in his first season under defensive coordinator Jim Johnson and was subsequently named to the 2000 Pro Bowl, marking the first Pro Bowl selection of his career.

==== 2000 ====
In week 11, Dawkins collected a season-high eight combined tackles during a 26–23 victory at the Pittsburgh Steelers. The following week, he recorded seven combined tackles and made a season-high two sacks on Cardinals' quarterback Jake Plummer during the Eagles' 34–9 win at the Arizona Cardinals in week 12. Dawkins finished the 2000 season with a total of 75 combined tackles, four interceptions, two sacks, and a forced fumble in 13 games and 13 starts.

==== 2001 ====
Head coach Andy Reid retained the core of the starting secondary as the starters, including Dawkins, Troy Vincent, and Bobby Taylor. Dawkins was paired with starting strong safety Damon Moore in 2001.

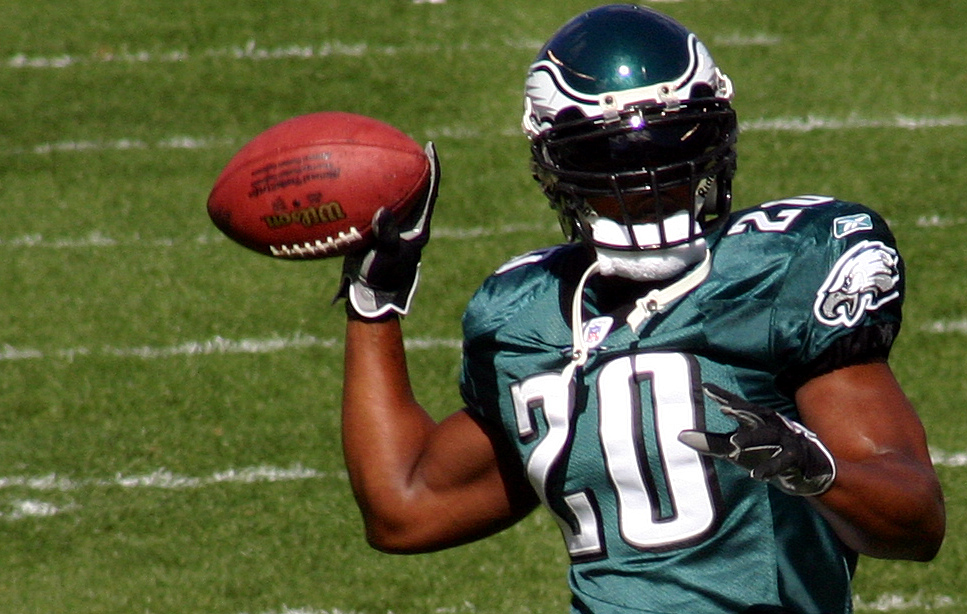
Dawkins before a 2007 Eagles game

He started in the Philadelphia Eagles' season-opener against the St. Louis Rams and collected a season-high eight combined tackles and deflected three passes in their 20–17 loss. On December 9, 2001, Dawkins tied his season-high of eight combined tackles, broke up two passes, forced a fumble, and returned a fumble recovery for a touchdown during the Eagles' 24–14 win against the San Diego Chargers in week 13. Dawkins forced a fumble by Chargers' running back LaDainian Tomlinson in the first quarter and recovered the ball before returning it for a 49-yard touchdown. On December 16, 2001, he made six solo tackles, two pass deflections, and intercepted two passes by quarterback Tony Banks in the Eagles' 20–6 victory against the Washington Redskins in week 14. He finished the season with 68 combined tackles (56 solo), 14 passes defensed, two interceptions, two forced fumbles, 1.5 sacks, and a touchdown in 15 games and 15 starts. The Philadelphia Eagles defense ranked second in the league in 2001 and the secondary continued to have success under position coaches Leslie Frazier and Steve Spagnuolo. The secondary allowed the second-fewest yards in the league (2,928 yards) and allowed the second-fewest touchdown passes (13). On January 3, 2002, Dawkins was one of five Philadelphia Eagles' players named to the 2002 Pro Bowl.

The Philadelphia Eagles finished first in the NFC East with an 11–5 record. Head coach Andy Reid opted to rest Dawkins for the Eagles' week 17 victory at the Tampa Bay Buccaneers as they had already clinched a playoff berth. On January 12, 2002, Dawkins recorded two combined tackles, broke up two passes, and made an interception during a 31–9 win against the Tampa Bay Buccaneers in the NFC Wild Card Game. The following week, they defeated the Chicago Bears 33–19 in the NFC Divisional Round. On January 27, 2002, Dawkins recorded six solo tackles and deflected a pass as the Eagles lost 29–24 at the St. Louis Rams in the NFC Championship Game.

==== 2002 ====
Head coach Andy Reid named Dawkins the starting free safety to begin the regular season, alongside strong safety Blaine Bishop. The secondary also included returning cornerbacks Troy Vincent, Bobby Taylor, and Al Harris.

External videos
- Brian Dawkins' Quadrafecta Game (2002)
- Brian Dawkins' sets unreal record

On September 29, 2002, Dawkins recorded six combined tackles, a sack, two pass deflections, an interception, forced a fumble, and caught his first career touchdown pass during a 35–17 victory against the Houston Texans in week 4. Dawkins' 57-yard touchdown reception came on a shuffle pass by running back Brian Mitchell during a fake punt in the third quarter. Dawkins became the first player in NFL history to make a sack, an interception, recover a fumble, and have a touchdown reception in a single game. In week 17, he collected a season-high ten combined tackles (seven solo) during a 10–7 loss at the New York Giants. Dawkins started all 16 games in 2002 and recorded 91 combined tackles (62 solo), nine passes defensed, five forced fumbles, three sacks, two interceptions, and one touchdown reception. Jimmy Johnson's defense continued to have moderate success and finished the season ranked second behind the Tampa Bay Buccaneers. The Eagles' defense also ranked seventh in passing yards allowed (3,094 yards) and tied for seventh in passing touchdowns allowed (18). On January 14, 2003, it was announced that Dawkins was selected to play in the 2003 Pro Bowl. The Eagles' secondary had three players selected in 2003, including Troy Vincent and Bobby Taylor.

The Philadelphia Eagles finished first in the NFC East with a 12–4 record and earned a first-round bye. On January 11, 2003, Dawkins made four combined tackles, a pass deflection, and an interception during a 20–6 victory against the Atlanta Falcons in the NFC Divisional Round. They were eliminated from the playoffs the following week after losing 27–10 to the Tampa Bay Buccaneers in the NFC Championship Game.

==== 2003 ====
On April 28, 2003, the Philadelphia Eagles signed Dawkins to a six-year, $43 million contract extension that included a signing bonus of $8 million. The contract extension was added to the one year Dawkins had remaining on his pre-existing contract.

"If I am going to build a football team (from scratch), Dawkins is my free safety. Brian can play free safety, strong safety, and not miss a beat. He has the toughness to play strong and the cover ability as far as playing cornerback."

— Jim Johnson
Philadelphia Eagles' Defensive coordinator (2003)

Dawkins remained the starting free safety in 2003 and was coached by defensive backs coach Steve Spagnuolo and assistant defensive backs coach Sean McDermott. Head coach Andy Reid named Dawkins the starter to begin the regular season, along with starting strong safety Michael Lewis and cornerbacks Troy Vincent, Bobby Taylor, and Lito Sheppard. He started in the Philadelphia Eagles' season-opener against the Tampa Bay Buccaneers and collected a season-high nine combined tackles before exiting in the fourth quarter of their 17–0 loss due to a sprained ankle. His injury sidelined him for the next eight games (Weeks 2–10). Dawkins was also inactive for the Eagles' week 12 win against the New Orleans Saints due to a foot injury. He finished the 2003 season with 35 combined tackles (28 solo), five pass deflections, an interception, and was credited with half a sack in seven games and seven starts.

The Philadelphia Eagles finished atop their division with a 12–4 record. On January 11, 2004, Dawkins recorded eight solo tackles, deflected a pass, and returned an interception by Brett Favre for a 35-yard gain to set up a 31-yard field goal to help the Eagles win the NFC Divisional Round against the Green Bay Packers 20–17. The following week, they lost to the Carolina Panthers 14–3 in the NFC Championship Game after Eagles' quarterback Donovan McNabb was intercepted three times by Panthers' safety Ricky Manning.

==== 2004 ====
Dawkins and Michael Lewis returned as the starting safety duo and also played alongside cornerbacks Lito Sheppard and Sheldon Brown after Troy Vincent and Bobby Taylor departed in free agency. On November 7, 2004, Dawkins collected a season-high nine solo tackles, broke up a pass, and made an interception during a 27–3 loss at the Pittsburgh Steelers. In week 14, he made six combined tackles, a pass deflection, and an interception in the Eagles' 17–14 win at the Washington Redskins. His interception continued his streak of three consecutive games with an interception. On December 23, 2004, it was announced that Dawkins was selected to play in the 2005 Pro Bowl, along with Michael Lewis and Lito Sheppard. He finished the 2004 season with 69 combined tackles (64 solo), eight passes defensed, four interceptions, three sacks, and two forced fumbles in 15 games and 15 starts. Head coach Andy Reid elected to rest Dawkins for the Eagles' week 17 matchup against the Cincinnati Bengals as they had already clinched a playoff berth.

External videos
- Dawkins gets clean hit on Alge Crumpler

The Philadelphia Eagles finished first in the NFC East with a 13–3 record and earned a first-round bye. The Eagles reached the NFC Championship Game after losing and being eliminated from the playoffs in three consecutive seasons. On January 23, 2005, Dawkins made a tackle, two pass deflections, and intercepted a pass by Falcons' quarterback Michael Vick during a 27–10 win against the Atlanta Falcons in the NFC Championship Game. Dawkins played a key role and delivered a devastating hit on Falcons' tight end Alge Crumpler during the game. On February 6, 2005, Dawkins recorded five combined tackles as the Eagles lost 24–21 to the New England Patriots in Super Bowl. This became Dawkins' first and only Super Bowl appearance.

==== 2005 ====
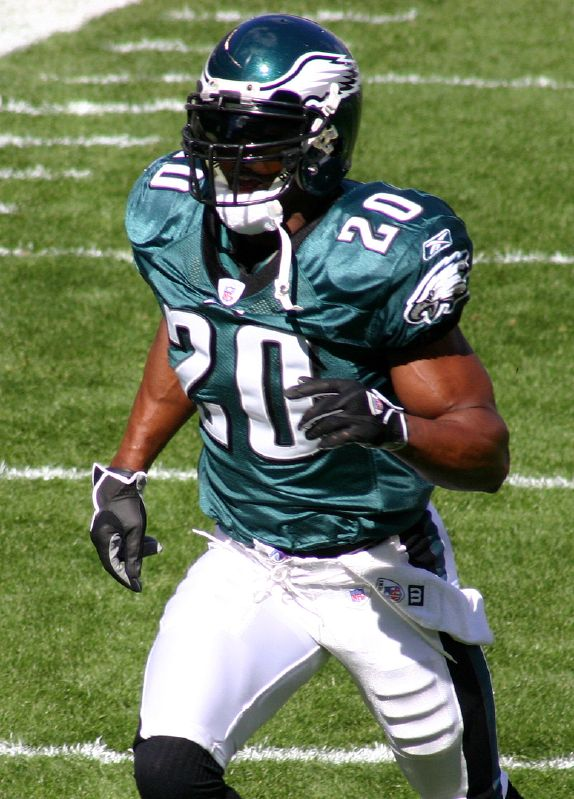
Dawkins in 2007

Defensive coordinator Jim Johnson retained the starting secondary in 2005. On December 11, 2005, Dawkins made four combined tackles, a season-high four pass deflections, a sack, and an interception in the Eagles' 26–23 loss to the New York Giants in week 14. In week 16, Dawkins collected a season-high eight combined tackles during a 27–21 loss at the Arizona Cardinals. He started in all 16 games in 2005 and recorded 77 combined tackles (66 solo), a career-high 19 pass deflections, four forced fumbles, 3.5 sacks, and three interceptions.

On January 26, 2006, it was announced that Dawkins was named to the 2006 Pro Bowl as a late-replacement for Chicago Bears' safety Mike Brown who was inactive due to an injury.

==== 2006 ====
Head coach Andy Reid elected to retain Dawkins and Michael Lewis as the starting safety duo, along with cornerbacks Sheldon Brown and Lito Sheppard in 2006. In week 6, Dawkins began playing alongside Sean Considine after he surpassed Michael Lewis on the depth chart and remained the starter for the rest of the season. On December 17, 2006, Dawkins collected a season-high 12 combined tackles (11 solo), two pass deflections, and an interception during a 36–22 win at the New York Giants in week 15. On December 20, 2006, Dawkins was named to the 2007 Pro Bowl. Dawkins started in all 16 games in 2006 and recorded 93 combined tackles (71 solo), nine pass deflections, five forced fumbles, four pass interceptions, and a sack.

==== 2007 ====
Dawkins returned as the starting free safety in 2007, alongside strong safety Sean Considine. On September 17, 2007, he recorded four solo tackles and deflected a pass before exiting the Eagles' 20–12 loss to the Washington Redskins on Monday Night Football due to an injury. Dawkins was sidelined for the next five games (Weeks 3–8) due to a neck injury he sustained against the Redskins. In week 10, he collected a season-high eight combined tackles and deflected a pass during a 33–25 victory at the Washington Redskins. He was also inactive for the Eagles' week 17 win against the Buffalo Bills. Dawkins finished the season with 37 combined tackles (28 solo), six pass deflections, and an interception in ten games and ten starts.

==== 2008 ====
Head coach Andy Reid named Dawkins the starting free safety, alongside strong safety Quintin Mikell and cornerbacks Sheldon Brown and Asante Samuel. In week 5, he collected a season-high eight solo tackles and a sack during a 23–17 loss to the Washington Redskins. His sack on Redskins' quarterback Jason Campbell was the 20th sack of his career. He joined the 20/20 club after becoming the tenth player in NFL history to have 20 sacks and 20 interceptions in a career. His total at the time stood at 20 career sacks and 33 interceptions. He also broke fellow Jacksonville native and former Eagles' wide receiver Harold Carmichael's franchise record of 180 career games. He started in all 16 games in 2008 and recorded 75 combined tackles (64 solo), six pass deflections, three sacks, and an interception.

External videos
- 2008: Best of Brian Dawkins

He is also a member of the 30/30 club of players who have at least 30 interceptions and 30 forced fumbles. He and Charles Tillman are the only players to record at least 35 of each. (Forced fumbles have only been a recorded stat since 1991.) He finished his career with the Eagles starting 182 of 183 games, recording 898 tackles, 34 interceptions, 32 forced fumbles, and 26 sacks.

=== Denver Broncos ===
==== 2009 ====
On February 28, 2009, the Denver Broncos signed Dawkins to a five-year, $17 million contract that included $7.2 million guaranteed. He joined another teammate, Correll Buckhalter, who also signed with the Broncos. The contract also included a termination clause that permitted Dawkins to opt out of the contract after two years and receives an extra $1.8 million, virtually making the contract for two years and $9 million. Dawkins could have also earned an additional $10 million in performance incentives. The Philadelphia Eagles and Dawkins were discussing a possible two-year contract before Dawkins received interest from the Denver Broncos.

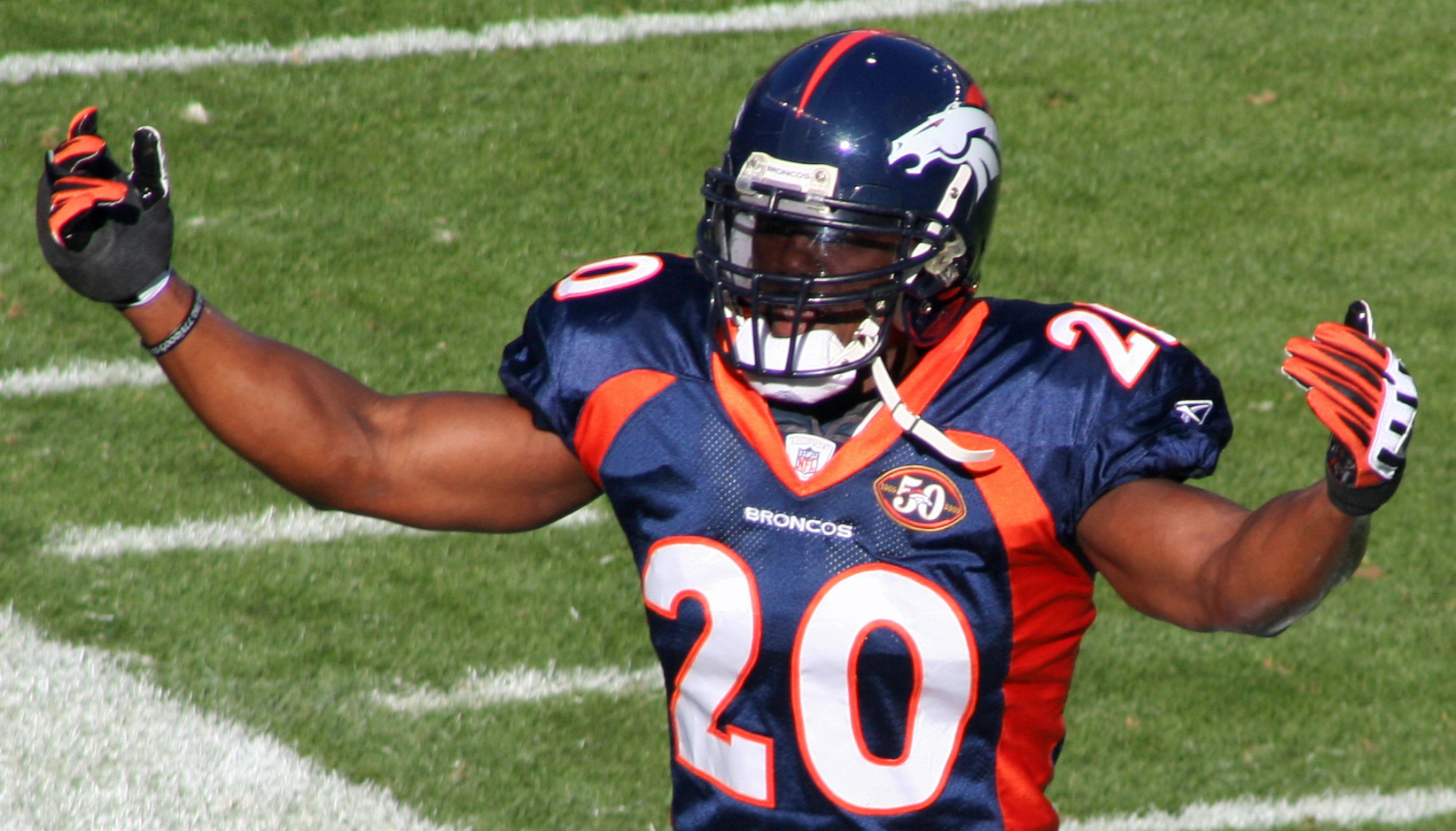
Dawkins in 2009 with the Broncos

Head coach Josh McDaniels named Dawkins the starting free safety to begin the regular season, alongside strong safety Renaldo Hill and cornerbacks Champ Bailey and Andre Goodman. In week 10, he collected a season-high 14 combined tackles (12 solo) during a 27–17 loss at the Washington Redskins. On December 13, 2009, Dawkins made ten combined tackles, two pass deflections, and intercepted two pass attempts by quarterback Peyton Manning during the Broncos' 28–16 loss at the Indianapolis Colts in week 14. On December 27, 2009, Dawkins recorded eight combined tackles in his return to Lincoln Financial Field during a 30–27 loss at the Philadelphia Eagles in week 16. On December 29, 2009, it was announced that Dawkins was selected to the 2008 Pro Bowl. He started all 16 games in 2009 and recorded 116 combined tackles (95 solo), 11 pass deflections, two interceptions, and a forced fumble. Following the 2009 season, Dawkins was named to the NFL 2000s All-Decade Team as a first team safety alongside Ed Reed; the second team safety group consisted of Darren Sharper and future Hall of Famer Troy Polamalu.

==== 2010 ====
On January 18, 2010, the Denver Broncos mutually parted ways with defensive coordinator Mike Nolan. They promoted linebackers coach Don Martindale to defensive coordinator. Head coach Josh McDaniels elected to retain the starting secondary in 2009. Dawkins was sidelined for two games (Weeks 6–7) due to a knee injury. He further aggravated his knee injury and was inactive for another three games (Weeks 13–15). On December 7, 2009, the Denver Broncos fired head coach Josh McDaniels after they fell to a 3–9 record. In week 16, he collected a season-high nine combined tackles and deflected a pass during a 24–23 win against the Houston Texans. He finished the season with 66 combined tackles (55 solo), five pass deflections, two sacks, and an interception in 11 games and 11 starts.

==== 2011 ====
Head coach John Fox named Dawkins the starting strong safety to begin the regular season, alongside free safety Rahim Moore. He started in the Denver Broncos' season-opener against the Oakland Raiders and collected a season-high nine combined tackles in their 23–20 loss. On October 23, 2011, Dawkins made five combined tackles and two sacks during an 18–15 win at the Miami Dolphins in week 7. He was sidelined for a game in week 15 and week 17 due to a reoccurring neck injury. He finished the season with 51 combined tackles (38 solo), six pass deflections, three sacks, and a forced fumble in 14 games and 12 starts. On January 19, 2012, it was announced that Dawkins would play in the 2012 Pro Bowl as a late injury replacement for Pittsburgh Steelers' safety Troy Polamalu.

=== Retirement ===
After calling Fox on April 23, 2012, Dawkins announced via Twitter that he was retiring from the NFL. His reasoning was he wanted to retire while he was still healthy. He planned to stay in Colorado, and wanted to begin coaching high school football that fall.

On April 28, 2012, Dawkins alongside Jeffrey Lurie announced that he would sign a one-day contract, and retire as a member of the Philadelphia Eagles. The Eagles retired Dawkins' number 20 in a ceremony at half-time of their September 30 game against the New York Giants. The Eagles have retired only nine players' jerseys in franchise history, which goes back more than 80 years.

=== Hall of Fame ===
On February 4, 2018, it was announced that Dawkins was voted into the Pro Football Hall of Fame and was one of five players selected. Dawkins joined Randy Moss, Brian Urlacher, Ray Lewis, and former Eagles teammate Terrell Owens.

"He was the heartbeat of the defense."

— Andy Reid
former Philadelphia Eagles' head coach

External videos
- Brian Dawkins' Hall of Fame speech
- Brian Dawkins' Hall of Fame celebration

On August 4, 2018, Dawkins was officially inducted into the Pro Football Hall of Fame and attended the ceremony at the Pro Football Hall of Fame in Canton, Ohio. He was the first former Clemson player to be inducted into the Pro Football Hall of Fame.

=== Legacy ===
Over the span of his career, Dawkins developed a reputation as a ball-hawking safety and became the unquestioned leader of the Philadelphia Eagles' defense. He earned the nickname "Weapon X," a codename of Marvel character Wolverine, the comic book superhero known for relentless aggression. He emerged as one of the top safeties in the league and was a defensive captain for the majority of his stints with both the Philadelphia Eagles and Denver Broncos. Dawkins is considered to be one of the top safeties in NFL history and was ranked as the fifth best safety in NFL history by NFL analyst Gil Brandt.

External videos
- NFL Legends: Dawkins' career highlights

As a captain and unquestioned leader, Dawkins has acted as a mentor to multiple players early in their career, including Al Harris, Chris Harris Jr., Jason Avant, and Quintin Mikell. Chris Harris Jr. credits Dawkins and Champ Bailey for urging the Denver Broncos' coaching staff to play him as an undrafted rookie after he showed promise and performed well in practice squad.

== Post-playing career ==
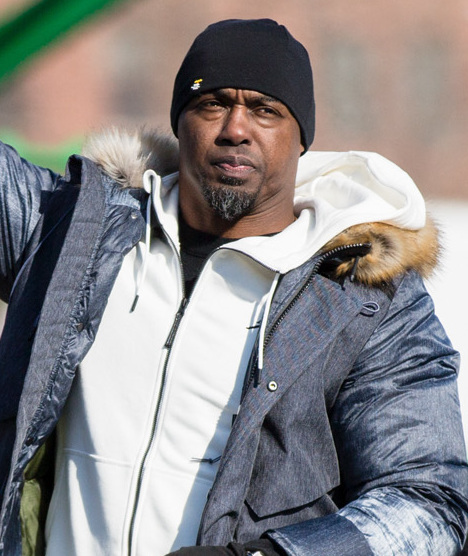
Dawkins at the Eagles Super Bowl parade in 2018

On September 5, 2012, it was announced that Dawkins was hired as an NFL studio analyst by ESPN.

On July 30, 2016, Dawkins returned to the Eagles to take a role on the team's scouting staff. On August 17, 2016, Dawkins was given the new role of Football Operations Executive to assist with player development.

On May 22, 2018, Dawkins resigned as Football Operations Executive to seek other opportunities.

== NFL career statistics ==
Legend
	Led the league
**Bold**	Career high
Underline	Incomplete data

Year	Team	Games		Tackles					Interceptions					Fumbles		
Year	Team	GP	GS	Cmb	Solo	Ast	Sck	TFL	INT	Yds	Lng	TD	PD	FF	FR	TD
1996	PHI	14	13	74	53	21	1.0	—	3	41	30	0	—	0	2	0
1997	PHI	15	15	74	61	13	0.0	—	3	76	64	**1**	—	0	0	0
1998	PHI	14	14	56	45	11	1.0	—	2	39	30	0	—	1	1	0
1999	PHI	16	16	78	58	20	1.5	4	**4**	**127**	**67**	**1**	**24**	**6**	2	0
2000	PHI	13	13	72	55	17	2.0	4	**4**	62	32	0	10	1	2	0
2001	PHI	15	15	70	58	12	1.5	5	2	15	15	0	17	2	2	**1**
2002	PHI	16	16	95	66	**29**	3.0	5	2	27	27	0	12	5	**4**	0
2003	PHI	7	7	35	28	7	0.5	1	1	0	0	0	6	0	0	0
2004	PHI	15	15	70	62	8	3.0	3	**4**	40	32	0	12	2	1	0
2005	PHI	16	16	80	69	11	**3.5**	4	3	24	24	0	**24**	4	1	0
2006	PHI	16	16	98	76	22	1.0	5	**4**	38	38	0	14	5	0	0
2007	PHI	10	10	37	28	9	0.0	3	1	1	1	0	6	0	0	0
2008	PHI	16	16	75	64	11	3.0	**11**	1	25	25	0	7	**6**	1	0
2009	DEN	16	16	**116**	**95**	21	0.0	6	2	0	0	0	10	1	3	0
2010	DEN	11	11	66	55	11	2.0	3	1	–2	–2	0	5	2	0	0
2011	DEN	14	12	51	38	13	3.0	5	0	0	0	0	6	1	0	0
Career		224	221	1,147	911	236	26.0	59	37	513	67	2	153	36	19	1

== Career highlights ==
=== NFL ===
As player

- 4× First-team All-Pro (2001, 2002, 2004, 2006)
- Second-team All-Pro (2009)
- 9× Pro Bowl (1999, 2001, 2002, 2004–2006, 2008, 2009, 2011)
- NFL 2000s All-Decade Team
- NFLPA Alan Page Community Award (2009)
- PFWA NFL All-Rookie Team (1996)
- Philadelphia Eagles Hall of Fame
- Philadelphia Eagles 75th Anniversary Team
- Philadelphia Eagles No. 20 retired
- Pro Football Hall of Fame (2018)
- 20/20 Club
- The first player in NFL history to record a sack, an interception, forced fumble, and touchdown reception in a single game
- The first player in NFL history to record at least 30 interceptions and 30 forced fumbles in a career.
- Has forced 36 fumbles, the most ever by a safety in NFL history
- Only player in NFL history with 25+ interceptions (37), forced fumbles (36), and sacks (26)

As administrator

- Super Bowl champion (LII)

=== College ===
- Second-team All-American (1995)
- First-team All-ACC (1995)
- 2× Second-team All-ACC (1993, 1994)

== Personal life ==
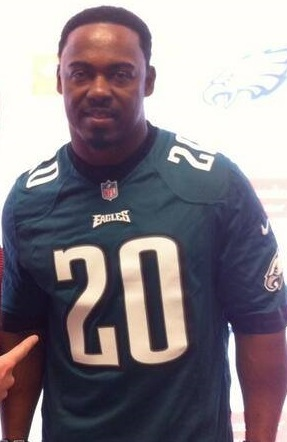
Dawkins in 2014

Dawkins was born and raised in Jacksonville, Florida. In an interview, Dawkins talked about getting married: "I went to college at Clemson, and she (Connie) transferred there my second year, after one year at Jacksonville University. The night before going back to school our junior year, I asked her to marry me. Her grandfather gave us $100. Fifty-nine dollars for my ring and $41 for hers—and we eloped. We went to the Justice of the Peace." He first saw his future wife, Connie Kerrin, in junior high school and began dating her while attending William M. Raines High School; she was a majorette while he played football and basketball. They graduated in 1992. In early 2007, Dawkins and his wife had twin daughters, Chonni and Cionni. Both daughters were born two months premature but are now both perfectly healthy. Dawkins, with his wife, Connie, also have two other children, Brian Jr. and Brionni. Brian Jr. played for the Clemson Tigers as a cornerback. After eloping in 1994, the couple had a wedding ceremony with family and friends at the Palm Beach Breakers Hotel in July 2009.

Dawkins is a Christian. Dawkins has said that his Christian faith has helped against depression and suicidal thoughts. During his NFL Hall of Fame speech, Dawkins said, "Thank you, Heavenly Father. Thank you, Heavenly Father, for blessing me with the sense to understand that I did not do everything by myself ... You have guided me the whole way, orchestrated my life ... You stayed faithful to me, and I cannot wait to see what You're going to do with me next."

While with the Eagles, Dawkins had been a resident of Voorhees Township, New Jersey, but put his house there up for sale after joining the Broncos.

After Dawkins signed with the Broncos in 2009, Dan Leone, an Eagles employee who was a gate chief at Lincoln Financial Field was fired by the Eagles after Leone posted messages on his Facebook page expressing his disappointment in the team. Dawkins announced that he would give his two allotted game tickets for the 2009 Eagles-Broncos game to Leone, saying, "I felt it would be a good thing, to reach out to that individual and just let him know how much I appreciate it."

Dawkins' nephew, Dalyn Dawkins played for Colorado State and was signed as an undrafted free agent by the Tennessee Titans.

In April 2019, it was announced that Wawa and Dawkins teamed up to create a hoagie called "The Dawk". It has grilled chicken, Parmesan cheese, spinach, tomato, pickles, sweet peppers, and yellow mustard. It was available for a limited time and only at the Wawa in Dawkins's hometown of Jacksonville, Florida.
