= Mike Mamula =

American football player (born 1973)

No. 59
- Position: Defensive end

Personal information
- Born: August 14, 1973 (age 53); Lackawanna, New York, U.S.
- Listed height: 6 ft 5 in (1.96 m)
- Listed weight: 252 lb (114 kg)

Career information
- High school: Lackawanna
- College: Boston College
- NFL draft: 1995: 1st round, 7th overall pick

Career history
- Philadelphia Eagles (1995–2000)

Awards and highlights
- PFWA All-Rookie Team (1995); All-Big East (1994)

Career NFL statistics
- Tackles: 209
- Sacks: 31.5
- Forced fumbles: 8
- Fumble recoveries: 6
- Interceptions: 1
- Defensive touchdowns: 2
- Stats at Pro Football Reference

Michael Brian Mamula (born August 14, 1973) is an American former professional football player for the Philadelphia Eagles of the National Football League (NFL). He was selected by the Philadelphia Eagles in the first round (seventh overall) of the 1995 NFL draft. He played college football for the Boston College Eagles.

== College career ==
Mamula played college football for the Boston College Eagles. He redshirted in 1991 and then hurt a shoulder at the beginning of the 1992 season, although he played through it. In 1993, as a junior, Mamula had 84 tackles and 11 sacks as a rush-backer in a 3-4 defense for Boston College. Mamula added another sack in the Carquest Bowl, bringing his season total to twelve. In 1994, his senior year they switched to a 4-3 defense and Mamula was a right defensive end. From that position he had 73 tackles and 13 sacks and four more in the team's 12-7 Aloha Bowl win over Kansas State University, bringing his season total to 17 sacks. For his efforts, he was voted All-Big East.

== Professional career ==
Mamula was one of the first players to train specifically for the combine drills, performing each drill hundreds of times in the months leading up to the combine. Although that practice is prevalent today, in 1995 most players performed football drills and paid less attention to the specific drills measured at the combine. Mamula had 26 reps of 225 lb bench presses, which was more reps than the top tackle taken in the draft (Tony Boselli), and his 4.58 40-yard dash time was considered extremely fast for his position. He scored a 49 out of 50 in the Wonderlic Test, which is the second highest score ever recorded by an NFL player. In addition he also had a 38.5" vertical jump, higher than cornerback Jimmy Hitchcock.

Mamula also performed the Four-Square run in 7.82#. (The pound sign "#" is not to be confused with the 3-cone drill, which is now in use at the NFL Combine. The Four-Square drill was the drill used in that era.) Mamula's 7.82 second drill was only 0.03 second off the best time (7.79#) posted at that combine. Additionally, Mamula posted a standing broad jump of 10'-5" inches and a 20-yard shuttle of 4.03 seconds. Of the 300 players at the combine regardless of position, the fastest 40 was 4.42, the best vertical jump was 41½, the best standing broad jump was 10'-11", the best 20-yard shuttle was 3.90, the best 4-square was 7.79 and the best bench press was 37 reps.

Pre-draft measurables
Height	Weight	Arm length	Hand span	40-yard dash	10-yard split	20-yard split	20-yard shuttle	Vertical jump	Broad jump	Bench press	Wonderlic
6 ft 4 5/8 in (1.95 m)	248 lb (112 kg)	33 1/8 in (0.84 m)	10 1/4 in (0.26 m)	4.58 s	1.62 s	2.74 s	4.03 s	38 1/2 in (0.98 m)	10 ft 5 in (3.18 m)	26 reps	49
All values from NFL Combine

The Philadelphia Eagles traded their first-round draft pick (12th overall), and two second-round selections to the Tampa Bay Buccaneers in exchange for Tampa Bay's first-round draft pick (7th overall) and a third-round selection. All picks involved in this trade were in the 1995 NFL draft. The Eagles then selected Mamula, apparently hoping he would fill the void left by Reggie White two years earlier. The Buccaneers went on to draft Warren Sapp with the 12th pick, and traded the pair of second-round picks for the 28th overall pick in the same draft, which they used to get Derrick Brooks.

During a 77 game career with the Eagles, Mamula had 209 total tackles and 31.5 sacks. His best seasons were 1996 and 1999. In 1996, he logged 8 sacks and in 1999 he had 8½, after recovering from missing the entire 1998 season. He also picked off a pass from Kurt Warner and returned it for a touchdown in the last game of the 1999 season. He was forced to retire after the 2000 season due to injuries. Mamula was inducted into Boston College's Sports Hall of Fame.

Because Mamula's subsequent NFL career did not track with projections extrapolated based upon his top combine showing, he is often pejoratively referred to as a "Workout Warrior" and his name is frequently invoked when players go into the combine as relative unknowns and come out as hot properties. In contrast, Sapp helped anchor the Bucs' defense for most of the second half of the 1990s and early 2000s, and went on to the Hall of Fame.

Michael David Smith wrote an article for The New York Times in 2008 refuting these characterizations, noting that scouts were impressed with Mamula's play while he was at BC and arguing that Mamula had an underrated career.

=== NFL statistics ===
Year	Team	GP	COMB	TOTAL	AST	Sck	FF	FR
1995	PHI	14	40	32	8	5.5	1	1
1996	PHI	16	52	41	11	8.0	3	2
1997	PHI	16	52	34	18	4.0	1	0
1999	PHI	16	39	27	12	8.5	3	2
2000	PHI	15	23	18	5	5.5	0	0
Career		77	206	152	54	31.5	8	5
