= Chris T. Jones =

American football player (born 1971)

Chris Jones
No. 82
- Position: Wide receiver

Personal information
- Born: August 7, 1971 (age 55); West Palm Beach, Florida, U.S.
- Listed height: 6 ft 3 in (1.91 m)
- Listed weight: 209 lb (95 kg)

Career information
- High school: Cardinal Newman (West Palm Beach)
- College: Miami
- NFL draft: 1995: 3rd round, 78th overall pick

Career history
- Philadelphia Eagles (1995–1997); Oakland Raiders (1999)

Awards and highlights
- National champion (1991)

Career NFL statistics
- Receptions: 80
- Receiving yards: 993
- Receiving touchdowns: 5
- Stats at Pro Football Reference

Christopher Todd Jones (born August 7, 1971) is an American former professional football player who was a wide receiver in the National Football League (NFL). He was selected by the Philadelphia Eagles in the third round of the 1995 NFL draft. He played college football for the Miami Hurricanes.

Jones also played for the Oakland Raiders.

== College career ==
Jones played for the Miami Hurricanes from 1991 to 1994, recording career totals of 105 receptions and 11 touchdowns on 1,640 receiving yards. He earned All-Big East First-team honors in 1993 and 1994.

== Professional career ==
Pre-draft measurables
Height	Weight	Arm length	Hand span	40-yard dash	10-yard split	20-yard split	20-yard shuttle	Vertical jump
6 ft 3 3/4 in (1.92 m)	210 lb (95 kg)	32 in (0.81 m)	9 5/8 in (0.24 m)	4.61 s	1.66 s	2.72 s	4.46 s	33.0 in (0.84 m)
All values from NFL Combine

=== Philadelphia Eagles ===
Jones was drafted by the Philadelphia Eagles with the 78th pick of the 1995 NFL draft. He played in 32 games, starting 17, for the Eagles from 1995 to 1997. He was released by the Eagles on August 20, 1998, as the team believed he could not come back from knee injuries.

=== Oakland Raiders ===
Jones signed with the Oakland Raiders on February 13, 1999. He was expected to be lost for up to six weeks after suffering a sprained left knee on August 15, 1999, in a pre-season game against the Dallas Cowboys. He was placed on injured reserve on September 3, 1999, as his injury was more severe than originally thought.

== Professional career statistics ==
Year	Team	Games	Receptions	Yards	Average Yards per Reception	Longest Reception	Touchdowns	First Downs	Fumbles	Fumbles Lost
1995	PHI	12	5	61	12.2	17	0	3	0	0
1996	PHI	16	70	859	12.3	38	5	51	1	0
1997	PHI	4	5	73	14.6	32	0	4	0	0
Total		32	80	993	12.4	38	5	58	1	0
