= 1995 Dallas Cowboys season =

Sports season

- Owner: Jerry Jones
- General manager: Jerry Jones
- Head coach: Barry Switzer
- Offensive coordinator: Ernie Zampese
- Defensive coordinator: Dave Campo
- Home stadium: Texas Stadium

Results
- Record: 12–4
- Division place: 1st NFC East
- Playoffs: Won Divisional Playoffs (vs. Eagles) 30–11; Won NFC Championship (vs. Packers) 38–27; Won Super Bowl XXX (vs. Steelers) 27–17
- Pro Bowlers: QB Troy Aikman; RB Emmitt Smith; WR Michael Irvin; OT Mark Tuinei; G Larry Allen; C Ray Donaldson; TE Jay Novacek; OG Nate Newton; DE Charles Haley; S Darren Woodson

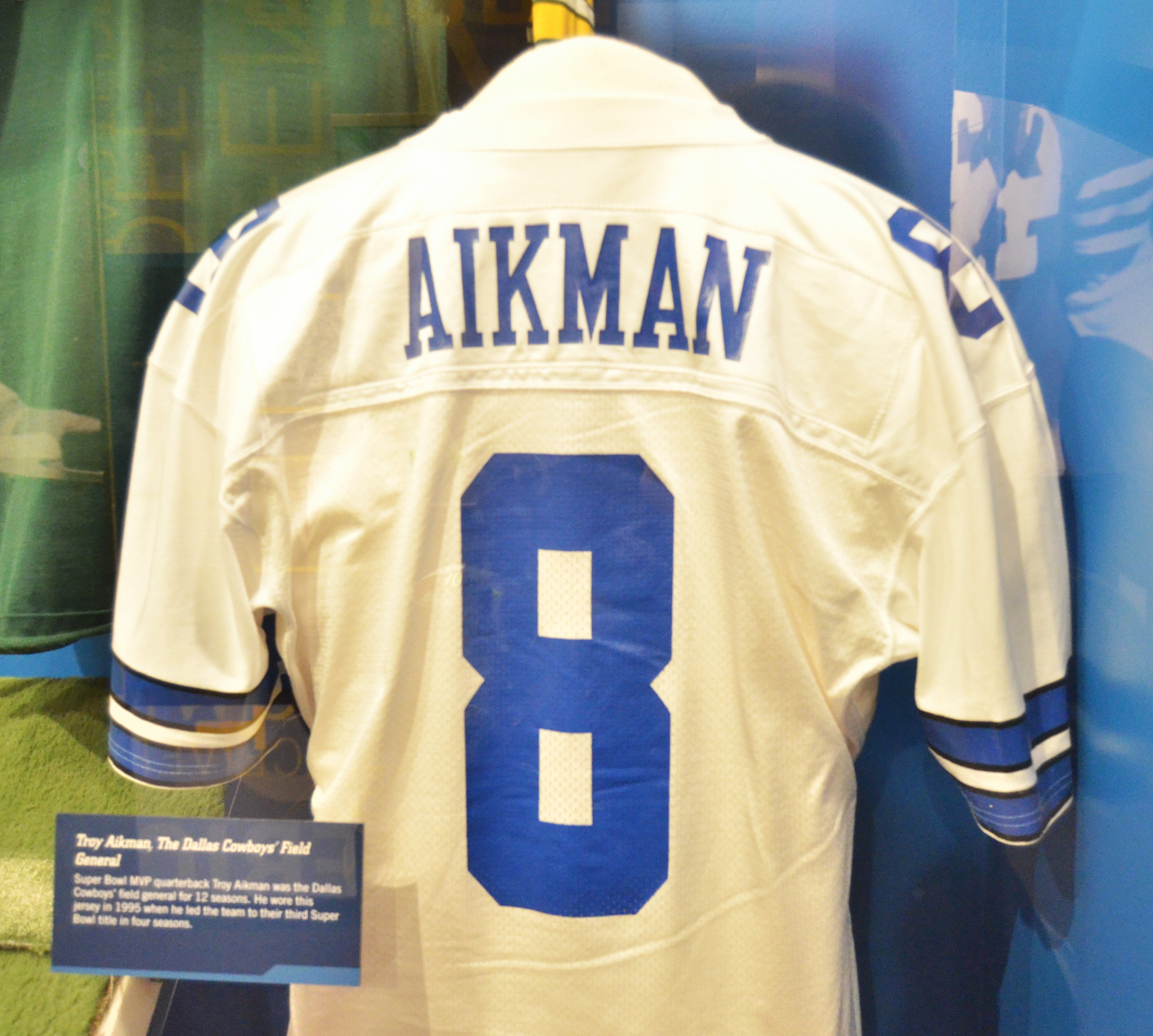
Quarterback Troy Aikman's jersey from the 1995 season (Pro Football Hall of Fame)

The 1995 Dallas Cowboys season was the franchise's 36th season in the National Football League (NFL) and was the second year under head coach Barry Switzer and final of the three Super Bowl titles they would win during 1992 to 1995. Dallas would be the first team to ever win three Super Bowls in a span of four seasons (would be later matched by the New England Patriots from the 2001 to 2004 seasons). Switzer guided the Cowboys to a fifth Super Bowl win by defeating the Pittsburgh Steelers 27–17 in Super Bowl XXX.

As of 2026, this is the most recent time the Cowboys made or won a Super Bowl, and is also the most recent time the Cowboys appeared in the NFC Championship Game, the longest such drought in the NFC and making them the only team that still has yet to make it in the 21st century. The last remaining active member of the 1995 Dallas Cowboys was offensive lineman Larry Allen, who retired after the 2007 season.

== Offseason ==
The 1995 NFL draft was one of the worst in Dallas Cowboys history. It is infamously known as the "backup draft", because the team considered their roster so strong, they drafted players based on their contributions as backups, which limited the future potential of their selections. The team traded their first-round draft choice (28th overall) to the Tampa Bay Buccaneers (they selected Derrick Brooks), in exchange for two second-round picks. The best player drafted would end up being Eric Bjornson.

Additions	Subtractions
CB Deion Sanders (49ers)	QB Rodney Peete (Eagles)
FS Scott Case (Falcons)	FB Lincoln Coleman (Falcons)
C Ray Donaldson (Seahawks)	C Mark Stepnoski (Oilers)
QB Wade Wilson (Saints)	LB Darrick Brownlow (Redskins)
	WR Alvin Harper (Buccaneers)
	DE Jim Jeffcoat (Bills)
	TE Scott Galbraith (Redskins)
	S James Washington (Redskins)
	S Kenneth Gant (Buccaneers)
	S Joe Fishback (Broncos)

=== 1995 expansion draft ===
Dallas Cowboys selected during the expansion draft
Round	Overall	Name	Position	Expansion team
11	21	Willie Jackson	WR	Jacksonville Jaguars
16	31	Dave Thomas	CB	Carolina Panthers

=== NFL draft ===
1995 Dallas Cowboys draft
Round	Pick	Player	Position	College	Notes
2	46	Sherman Williams	Running back	Alabama	
2	59	Kendell Watkins	Tight end	Mississippi State	
2	63	Shane Hannah	Guard	Michigan State	
3	92	Charlie Williams	Cornerback	Bowling Green	
4	110	Eric Bjornson	Tight end	Washington	
4	129	Alundis Brice	Cornerback	Ole Miss	
4	130	Linc Harden	Linebacker	Oklahoma State	
5	166	Ed Hervey	Wide receiver	USC	
5	168	Dana Howard	Linebacker	Illinois	
7	236	Oscar Sturgis	Defensive end	North Carolina	
Made roster † Pro Football Hall of Fame * Made at least one Pro Bowl during career

=== Undrafted free agents ===
1995 undrafted free agents of note
Player	Position	College
Rod Alexander	Wide receiver	Northern Arizona
John Anderson	Safety	Oklahoma
Jon Baker	Kicker	Arizona State
Freddie Coger	Linebacker	Georgia Tech
Billy Davis	Wide Receiver	Pittsburgh
Demetrius Edwards	Defensive tackle	Fresno State
Josh Evans	Defensive Tackle	UAB
Oronde Gadsden	Wide receiver	Winston-Salem State
Michael Goosby	Wide receiver	North Texas
Roger Graham	Running back	New Haven
Mike Gruttadauria	Center	UCF
Rodney Harris	Wide receiver	Kansas
Jim Hmielewski	Tackle	Kansas State
Artis Houston	Cornerback	California
Curtis Johnson	Running back	North Carolina
John Jones	Guard	Kansas
Michael McClenton	Fullback	North Alabama
Paul McCord	Punter	Western Maryland
Ryan McGrath	Tight end	Southwestern Louisiana
Dominique Ross	Running back	Valdosta State
Scott Semptimphelter	Quarterback	Lehigh
Mu Tagoai	Guard	Arizona
Jeff Thomas	Wide receiver	Georgia
DeMario Vaughn	Tackle	Arizona State

== Staff ==
1995 Dallas Cowboys staff
Front office: Owner/president/general manager – Jerry Jones; Public relations director – Rich Dalrymple; Head coaches: Head coach – Barry Switzer; Offensive coaches: Offensive coordinator – Ernie Zampese; Running backs – Joe Brodsky; Wide receivers – Hubbard Alexander; Tight ends – Robert Ford; Offensive line – Hudson Houck	Defensive coaches: Defensive coordinator – Dave Campo; Defensive line (Regular Season) – John Blake; Linebackers – Jim Eddy; Defensive backs – Mike Zimmer; Special teams coaches: Special teams – Joe Avezzano; Kicking/offensive and defensive quality control – Steve Hoffman; Strength and conditioning: Strength and conditioning – Mike Woicik

== Roster ==
Dallas Cowboys 1995 roster
Quarterbacks: 8 Troy Aikman; 17 Jason Garrett; 11 Wade Wilson; Running backs: 48 Daryl Johnston FB; 38 David Lang; 36 Dominique Ross; 22 Emmitt Smith; 20 Sherman Williams; Wide receivers: 87 Billy Davis; 82 Cory Fleming; 81 Edward Hervey; 88 Michael Irvin; 85 Kevin Williams KR/PR; Tight ends: 86 Eric Bjornson; 84 Jay Novacek; 83 Kendell Watkins	Offensive linemen: 73 Larry Allen G; 68 Michael Batiste G; 69 George Hegamin T; 60 Derek Kennard C; 61 Nate Newton G; 65 Ron Stone G/T; 71 Mark Tuinei T; 79 Erik Williams T; Defensive linemen: 91 Darren Benson DT; 96 Shante Carver DE; 94 Charles Haley DE; 95 Chad Hennings DT; 78 Leon Lett DT; 67 Russell Maryland DT; 99 Hurvin McCormack DE; 90 Oscar Sturgis DE; 92 Tony Tolbert DE	Linebackers: 58 Dixon Edwards OLB; 54 Darryl Hardy MLB/OLB; 55 Robert Jones MLB; 98 Godfrey Myles OLB; 52 Jim Schwantz OLB; 59 Darrin Smith OLB; Defensive backs: 23 Robert Bailey CB; 40 Bill Bates SS; 29 Alundis Brice CB; 43 Greg Briggs SS; 24 Larry Brown CB; 25 Scott Case FS; 31 Brock Marion FS; 21 Deion Sanders CB; 42 Charlie Williams CB; 28 Darren Woodson SS; Special teams: 18 Chris Boniol K; 70 Dale Hellestrae LS; 19 John Jett P	Reserve lists: 53 Ray Donaldson C (IR); 63 Shane Hannah G (IR); 47 Clayton Holmes CB (Susp.); 26 Kevin Smith CB (IR); Practice squad: 1 Oronde Gadsden WR; 62 John Jones G; 89 Greg Schorp TE; Rookies in italics 52 active, 4 inactive, 3 practice squad

== Season summary ==
The 1995 season once more saw a number of key veterans depart via free agency due to the NFL salary cap, including wide receiver Alvin Harper to the Tampa Bay Buccaneers, safety James Washington to the Washington Redskins, center Mark Stepnoski to the Houston Oilers and longtime Cowboys veteran defensive end Jim Jeffcoat to the Buffalo Bills. Starting cornerback Kevin Smith was out the remainder of the season after an injury in week one. Perhaps the most prominent addition came on September 9, 1995, when Dallas signed All-Pro cornerback Deion Sanders away from the San Francisco 49ers. Running back Emmitt Smith earned his fourth NFL rushing title and set a then-record 25 rushing touchdowns in a season against the Arizona Cardinals to secure home field advantage throughout the playoffs.

The season began with victories against the Giants, Broncos, Vikings in overtime, and Cardinals. In week five at the Redskins, Troy Aikman was injured early and the Cowboys suffered their first loss of the season. There were unsubstantiated rumors that Aikman could have kept playing in the game but didn't want to because he didn't want to beat his old offensive coordinator Norv Turner who was Washington's head coach. Aikman returned the next week and led Dallas to wins over Green Bay, San Diego, the Falcons (marking Deion Sanders' debut game with the Cowboys), and the Eagles to move to 8–1.

In week ten, the struggling 49ers (only 5–4 and with Elvis Grbac substituting for injured Steve Young) came to Texas Stadium and shocked the Cowboys, 38–20; the game's signature play was San Francisco's second play from scrimmage, from the Niners' 19-yard line, as Grbac's pass split Dallas's safeties and Jerry Rice scored.

The win started a six-game win streak for San Francisco while Dallas rebounded, beating the Raiders and Chiefs to move to 10–2, but then was upset at home by the Washington Redskins (the Redskins, who finished only 6–10, swept the eventual world champions; it was the Skins' seventh win in fourteen meetings since the firing of Tom Landry). The Cowboys lost their second game in a row in a controversial loss at Philadelphia where, with the game tied at 17 late in the fourth quarter, Coach Barry Switzer elected to "go for it" on 4th down and a foot at the Cowboys' 29-yard line. The Eagles initially stopped Dallas for no gain but the play was ruled dead because the two-minute warning was reached before Dallas snapped the ball. Switzer then elected to try again instead of punting, and this time the play was stopped for a 1-yard loss; Philly took over and soon kicked a field goal to get the win. While the Cowboys in general and Switzer in particular were excoriated by fans and the media, the team became stronger and angrier after this game (Deion Sanders publicly supported Switzer and the decision to try the 4th-down conversion) and eventually used those emotions to end the losing streak.

The next week, Dallas appeared headed for a third straight defeat at home to the mediocre Giants (only 5–9 entering the game) but thanks to a clutch late reception by Kevin Williams and a last-second field goal by Chris Boniol, the Cowboys prevailed. Rejuvenated, the team defeated the Arizona Cardinals and (combined with a 49ers loss the day before) secured home field advantage throughout the playoffs. The movie Jerry Maguire used footage from the Arizona matchup.

The Cowboys defeated the Philadelphia Eagles in the NFC divisional playoff game followed by a memorable NFC championship game victory against the Green Bay Packers at Texas Stadium. The team went on to face the Pittsburgh Steelers in the Super Bowl at Sun Devil Stadium in Arizona in an attempt to tie the record of a fifth Super Bowl title. Dallas dominated early, but as the Steelers gained momentum and threatened an upset over the heavily favored Cowboys, starting cornerback Larry Brown, after the tragic loss of his son Kristopher during the season, made his second interception of a pass from Steelers quarterback Neil O'Donnell to seal the Cowboys' victory. Brown was named Super Bowl MVP after the game.

== Preseason ==
Week	Date	Opponent	Result	Record	Venue	Recap
1	July 29	Buffalo Bills	W 21–15	1–0	Texas Stadium	Recap
2	August 5	Oakland Raiders	L 14–27	1–1	Texas Stadium	Recap
3	August 12	vs. Buffalo Bills	L 7–9	1–2	SkyDome (Toronto)	Recap
4	August 21	at Denver Broncos	L 17–20	1–3	Mile High Stadium	Recap
5	August 26	at Houston Oilers	W 10–0	2–3	Houston Astrodome	Recap

== Regular season ==
Week	Date	Opponent	Result	Record	Venue	Recap
1	September 4	at **New York Giants**	**W** 35–0	1–0	Giants Stadium	Recap
2	September 10	Denver Broncos	**W** 31–21	2–0	Texas Stadium	Recap
3	September 17	at Minnesota Vikings	**W** 23–17 (OT)	3–0	Hubert H. Humphrey Metrodome	Recap
4	September 24	**Arizona Cardinals**	**W** 34–20	4–0	Texas Stadium	Recap
5	October 1	at **Washington Redskins**	**L** 23–27	4–1	Robert F. Kennedy Memorial Stadium	Recap
6	October 8	Green Bay Packers	**W** 34–24	5–1	Texas Stadium	Recap
7	October 15	at San Diego Chargers	**W** 23–9	6–1	Jack Murphy Stadium	Recap
8	Bye					
9	October 29	at Atlanta Falcons	**W** 28–13	7–1	Georgia Dome	Recap
10	November 6	**Philadelphia Eagles**	**W** 34–12	8–1	Texas Stadium	Recap
11	November 12	San Francisco 49ers	**L** 20–38	8–2	Texas Stadium	Recap
12	November 19	at Oakland Raiders	**W** 34–21	9–2	Oakland–Alameda County Coliseum	Recap
13	November 23	Kansas City Chiefs	**W** 24–12	10–2	Texas Stadium	Recap
14	December 3	**Washington Redskins**	**L** 17–24	10–3	Texas Stadium	Recap
15	December 10	at **Philadelphia Eagles**	**L** 17–20	10–4	Veterans Stadium	Recap
16	December 17	**New York Giants**	**W** 21–20	11–4	Texas Stadium	Recap
17	December 25	at **Arizona Cardinals**	**W** 37–13	12–4	Sun Devil Stadium	Recap
Note: Intra-division opponents are in **bold** text.

=== Game summaries ===
==== Week 1:at New York Giants ====
Week 1: Dallas Cowboys at New York Giants – Game summary

Quarter	1	2	3	4	Total
**Cowboys**	7	14	7	7	**35**
Giants	0	0	0	0	**0**

at Giants Stadium, East Rutherford, New Jersey

- Date: September 4
- Game time: 9:00 p.m. EDT
- Game weather: Scattered clouds, 75 °F (24 °C)
- Game attendance: 77,454
- Referee: Bob McElwee
- TV announcers (ABC): Al Michaels, Frank Gifford, Dan Dierdorf and Lynn Swann

Game information

**First quarter**

- DAL – Emmitt Smith 60-yard run (Chris Boniol kick), 11:56. Cowboys 7–0.

**Second quarter**

- DAL – Michael Irvin 7-yard pass from Troy Aikman (Chris Boniol kick), 11:58. Cowboys 14–0.
- DAL – Emmitt Smith 1-yard run (Chris Boniol kick), 6:52. Cowboys 21–0.

**Third quarter**

- DAL – Emmitt Smith 1-yard run (Chris Boniol kick), 11:03. Cowboys 28–0.

**Fourth quarter**

- DAL – Emmitt Smith 1-yard run (Chris Boniol kick), 12:33. Cowboys 35–0.

**Top passers**

- DAL – Troy Aikman – 15/20, 228 yards, TD
- NYG – Dave Brown – 20/34, 155 yards, INT

**Top rushers**

- DAL – Emmitt Smith – 21 rushes, 163 yards, 4 TD
- NYG – Rodney Hampton – 14 rushes, 48 yards

**Top receivers**

- DAL – Michael Irvin – 7 receptions, 109 yards, TD
- NYG – Chris Calloway – 3 receptions, 35 yards

=== Standings ===
NFC East
	W	L	T	PCT	PF	PA	STK
^{(1)} Dallas Cowboys	12	4	0	.750	435	291	W2
^{(4)} Philadelphia Eagles	10	6	0	.625	318	338	L1
Washington Redskins	6	10	0	.375	326	359	W2
New York Giants	5	11	0	.313	290	340	L2
Arizona Cardinals	4	12	0	.250	275	422	L4

== Playoffs ==
=== Postseason schedule ===
Round	Date	Opponent (seed)	Result	Record	Venue	Game Recap
Wild Card	First-round bye					
Divisional	January 7, 1996	Philadelphia Eagles (4)	W 30–11	1–0	Texas Stadium	Recap
NFC Championship	January 14, 1996	Green Bay Packers (3)	W 38–27	2–0	Texas Stadium	Recap
Super Bowl XXX	January 28, 1996	Pittsburgh Steelers (A2)	W 27–17	3–0	Sun Devil Stadium	Recap

=== Divisional Playoffs vs Philadelphia Eagles ===
Philadelphia Eagles vs. Dallas Cowboys – Game summary

Quarter	1	2	3	4	Total
Eagles	0	3	0	8	11
Cowboys	3	14	6	7	30

at Texas Stadium, Irving, Texas

- Game time: 12:30 p.m. EST/11:30 a.m. CST
- Game weather: 32 °F (0 °C), clear
- Game attendance: 64,371
- Referee: Gerald Austin
- TV announcers (Fox): Pat Summerall and John Madden

Game information
- Scoring
  - DAL – field goal Boniol 24 DAL 3–0
  - PHI – field goal Anderson 26 Tie 3–3
  - DAL – Sanders 21 run (Boniol kick) DAL 10–3
  - DAL – Smith 1 run (Boniol kick) DAL 17–3
  - DAL – field goal Boniol 18 DAL 20–3
  - DAL – field goal Boniol 51 DAL 23–3
  - DAL – Irvin 9 pass from Aikman (Boniol kick) DAL 30–3
  - PHI – Cunningham 4 run (R. Johnson pass from Cunningham) DAL 30–11

=== NFC Championship Game ===
Dallas Cowboys 38, Green Bay Packers 27

Quarter	1	2	3	4	Total
Packers	10	7	10	0	27
Cowboys	14	10	0	14	38

at Texas Stadium, Irving, Texas

- Game time: 4:00 p.m. EST/3:00 p.m. CST
- Game weather: 78 °F (26 °C), clear
- Game attendance: 65,135
- Referee: Ed Hochuli
- TV announcers (Fox): Pat Summerall and John Madden

=== Super Bowl XXX ===
==== Scoring summary ====
- DAL – FG: Chris Boniol 42 yards 3–0 DAL
- DAL – TD: Jay Novacek 3 yard pass from Troy Aikman (Chris Boniol kick) 10–0 DAL
- DAL – FG: Chris Boniol 35 yards 13–0 DAL
- PIT – TD: Yancey Thigpen 6 yard pass from Neil O'Donnell (Norm Johnson kick) 13–7 DAL
- DAL – TD: Emmitt Smith 1 yard run (Chris Boniol kick) 20–7 DAL
- PIT – FG: Norm Johnson 46 yards 20–10 DAL
- PIT – TD: Byron "Bam" Morris 1 yard run (Norm Johnson kick) 20–17 DAL
- DAL – TD: Emmitt Smith 4 yard run (Chris Boniol kick) 27–17 DAL

== Awards and records ==
- Emmitt Smith, NFL rushing leader
- Emmitt Smith, NFL record for rushing touchdowns in a season (25, since broken)
- Emmitt Smith, NFL record for total touchdowns in a season (25, since broken)
- Larry Brown, Super Bowl Most Valuable Player

=== Milestones ===
- Michael Irvin, 100 Reception Season (Irvin finished the season with 111 receptions)
- In 1995, Emmitt Smith won his fourth rushing title. He rushed for a career-high 1,773 yards.

== Publications ==
- The Football Encyclopedia ISBN 0-312-11435-4
- Total Football ISBN 0-06-270170-3
- Cowboys Have Always Been My Heroes ISBN 0-446-51950-2
