= Ed West (American football) =

American football player (born 1961)

No. 49, 86, 83
- Position: Tight end

Personal information
- Born: August 2, 1961 (age 65); Colbert County, Alabama, U.S.
- Listed height: 6 ft 1 in (1.85 m)
- Listed weight: 250 lb (113 kg)

Career information
- High school: Colbert County (Leighton, Alabama)
- College: Auburn (1980–1983)
- NFL draft: 1984: undrafted

Career history
- Green Bay Packers (1984–1994); Indianapolis Colts (1995)*; Philadelphia Eagles (1995–1996); Atlanta Falcons (1997)
- * Offseason or practice squad member only

Career NFL statistics
- Receptions: 237
- Receiving yards: 2,665
- Receiving touchdowns: 27
- Stats at Pro Football Reference

Edward Lee West, III (born August 2, 1961), nicknamed "the Toolbox", is an American former professional football player who was a tight end in the National Football League (NFL). He played college football for the Auburn Tigers. West went undrafted but played in over 200 NFL games in 14 seasons from 1984 to 1997 for the Green Bay Packers, Philadelphia Eagles, and Atlanta Falcons.

== NFL career statistics ==
Legend
**Bold**	Career high

=== Regular season ===
Year	Team	Games		Receiving				
Year	Team	GP	GS	Rec	Yds	Avg	Lng	TD
1984	GNB	16	0	6	54	9.0	29	4
1985	GNB	16	0	8	95	11.9	30	1
1986	GNB	16	6	15	199	13.3	46	1
1987	GNB	12	11	19	261	**13.7**	40	1
1988	GNB	16	16	30	276	9.2	35	3
1989	GNB	13	12	22	269	12.2	31	**5**
1990	GNB	16	16	27	356	13.2	**50**	**5**
1991	GNB	16	16	15	151	10.1	21	3
1992	GNB	16	8	4	30	7.5	10	0
1993	GNB	16	7	25	253	10.1	24	0
1994	GNB	14	12	**31**	**377**	12.2	26	2
1995	PHI	16	14	20	190	9.5	26	1
1996	PHI	16	4	8	91	11.4	29	0
1997	ATL	12	3	7	63	9.0	23	1
		211	125	237	2,665	11.2	50	27

=== Playoffs ===
Year	Team	Games		Receiving				
Year	Team	GP	GS	Rec	Yds	Avg	Lng	TD
1993	GNB	2	2	**7**	**81**	**11.6**	**23**	0
1994	GNB	2	0	0	0	0.0	0	0
1995	PHI	2	2	2	19	9.5	11	0
1996	PHI	1	0	0	0	0.0	0	0
		7	4	9	100	11.1	23	0
