= Eric Bjornson =

American football player (born 1971)

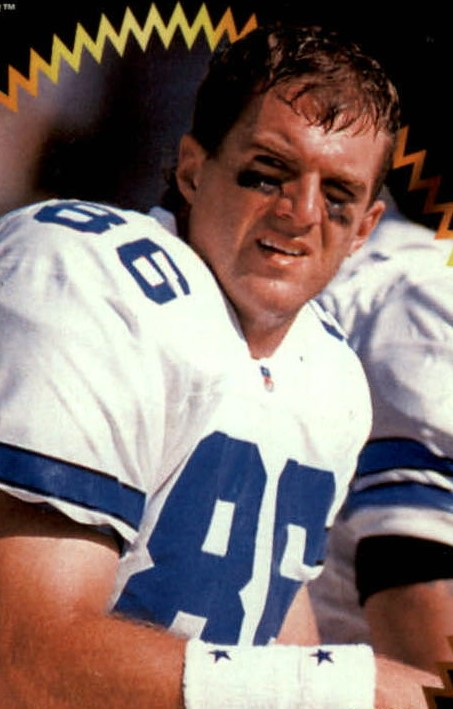
- Bjornson with the Dallas Cowboys

No. 86
- Position: Tight end

Personal information
- Born: December 15, 1971 (age 54); San Francisco, California, U.S.
- Listed height: 6 ft 4 in (1.93 m)
- Listed weight: 237 lb (108 kg)

Career information
- High school: Bishop O'Dowd (Oakland, California)
- College: Washington
- NFL draft: 1995: 4th round, 110th overall pick

Career history
- Dallas Cowboys (1995–1999); New England Patriots (2000); Oakland Raiders (2001)*
- * Offseason or practice squad member only

Awards and highlights
- Super Bowl champion (XXX); National champion (1991); Second-team All-Pac-10 (1994)

Career NFL statistics
- Receptions: 147
- Receiving yards: 1,384
- Receiving touchdowns: 8
- Stats at Pro Football Reference

Eric Thomas Bjornson (born December 15, 1971) is an American former professional football player who was a tight end in the National Football League (NFL) for the Dallas Cowboys and New England Patriots. He was selected by the Cowboys in the fourth round of the 1995 NFL draft. He played college football for the Washington Huskies.

== Early life ==
Bjornson attended Bishop O'Dowd High School, where he became a three-year starter at quarterback. As a sophomore, he had a game where he threw for 5 touchdowns.

As a senior, he helped his team earn a 10–1 record and the East Shore Athletic League championship. He received scholar-athlete awards from the National Football Foundation Hall of Fame and the Oakland Tribune. He finished his career with 583 completions for 4,074 yards and 36 touchdowns.

== College career ==
Bjornson accepted a football scholarship to the University of Washington. As a redshirt freshman in 1991, he was the third-string quarterback behind Billy Joe Hobert and Mark Brunell, on the national championship team. He was converted into a wide receiver as a sophomore, making 14 receptions for 170 yards and 2 touchdowns. As a junior, he returned to quarterback, as the backup to Damon Huard, getting a chance to start the final 3 games of the 1993 season, registering a 2–1 record.

As a senior, he was moved back to wide receiver, leading the team with 49 receptions (at the time fifth highest total in school history), for 770 yards and 7 touchdowns. He was sixth in the Pacific-10 in receptions and tied for second in touchdown receptions, while earning second-team All-Pac-10, Academic All-Pac-10 and second-team Academic All-American honors. He finished his college career with 64 receptions for 958 yards and 9 touchdowns.

== Professional career ==
=== Dallas Cowboys ===
Bjornson was selected by the Dallas Cowboys in the fourth round (110th overall) of the 1995 NFL draft, with the plan of converting him into a tight end. As a rookie, he contributed on special teams (6 tackles) and as a backup, while being part of the Super Bowl XXX championship team.

He became a starter in 1996, after Pro Bowler Jay Novacek suffered a back injury, that eventually forced him to retire. He would go on to start 10 games and had career-highs with 48 receptions (second on the team) and 3 touchdowns, despite playing through two sprained ankles that limited his playing time over the final four games of the regular season and the playoffs.

In 1997, although the Cowboys had drafted tight end David LaFleur in the first round, Bjornson still was an integral part of the offense, finishing second on the team and third among NFC tight ends with 47 receptions. He also was third on the team with a career-high 442 receiving yards, even though he suffered a fractured left fibula in Week 14.

In 1998, he was re-signed by the Cowboys to a two-year contract. That year, he played in all 16 games mainly as a backup (four starts) to LaFleur and although he was used some times as the slot receiver in four-wide receiver sets, his production decreased when he wasn't the starter.

In 1999, he played in all 16 games (six starts), finishing with 10 receptions for 131 yards. He was also used as the placekicker holder and had a 20-yard touchdown run on a fake field goal attempt.

Bjornson had 127 receptions for 1,232 yards (9.7 avg.) and six touchdowns during his five seasons with the Cowboys.

=== New England Patriots ===
On February 29, 2000, he signed as a free agent with the New England Patriots, but was released on November 15. He appeared in 8 games (6 starts), collecting 20 receptions for 152 yards and 2 touchdowns.

=== Oakland Raiders ===
On March 1, 2001, he signed as a free agent with the Oakland Raiders. He was released before the season started on August 28.

== NFL career statistics ==
Legend
	Won the Super Bowl
**Bold**	Career high

Year	Team	Games		Receiving				
Year	Team	GP	GS	Rec	Yds	Avg	Lng	TD
1995	DAL	14	1	7	53	7.6	16	0
1996	DAL	14	10	**48**	388	8.1	25	**3**
1997	DAL	14	14	47	**442**	9.4	32	0
1998	DAL	16	4	15	218	**14.5**	**43**	1
1999	DAL	16	6	10	131	13.1	32	0
2000	NWE	8	6	20	152	7.6	19	2
		82	41	147	1,384	9.4	43	6
