= Charlie Williams (American football) =

American football player (born 1972)

No. 42, 25
- Position: Safety / Cornerback

Personal information
- Born: February 2, 1972 (age 54); Detroit, Michigan, U.S.
- Listed height: 6 ft 0 in (1.83 m)
- Listed weight: 204 lb (93 kg)

Career information
- High school: Henry Ford (Detroit)
- College: Bowling Green
- NFL draft: 1995: 3rd round, 92nd overall pick

Career history
- Dallas Cowboys (1995–2000)

Awards and highlights
- Super Bowl champion (XXX)

Career NFL statistics
- Games played–started: 81–11
- Interceptions: 1
- Sacks: 2
- Stats at Pro Football Reference

Charlie U. Williams (born February 2, 1972) is an American former professional football player who was a defensive back in the National Football League (NFL) for the Dallas Cowboys. He played college football at Bowling Green State University.

== Early life ==
Williams attended Henry Ford High School, where he played wide receiver and cornerback. In a game he had as a junior, he registered 8 receptions, 2 touchdowns and 2 interceptions.

In his last two years he received All-city and All-public school league honors. He finished his high school career with 25 touchdowns and 12 interceptions.

== College career ==
Williams accepted a football scholarship from Bowling Green State University, where he became one of the best special teams players in school history. As a redshirt freshman, he was a wide receiver on the scout team. The next year, he played mainly on special teams and had 3 blocked kicks.

As a junior, he was a reserve wide receiver, until the last 2 games of the season when he was moved to nickelback. He posted 14 receptions for 192 yards, 12 tackles and 4 blocked kicks.

In his last year, although he lined up in multiple positions, he was also named the starter at safety. He missed the last four games with a broken right forearm, registering 31 tackles, 2 passes defensed and one interception. He also contributed with 5 receptions for 62 yards and one blocked kick. Against the University of Cincinnati, he made 5 tackles, one pass defensed and a block punt that he returned 30 yards during a 38-0 win. Against Eastern Michigan University, he had 7 tackles and one interception in a 30-13 win. He finished his college career with 8 blocked kicks.

== Professional career ==
Williams was selected by the Dallas Cowboys in the third round (95th overall) of the 1995 NFL draft, because they coveted his special teams skills and his athletic ability. As a rookie, he finished fourth on the team with 18 special teams tackles and was a part of the Super Bowl XXX championship team that won over the Pittsburgh Steelers.

In 1996, he tore the anterior cruciate ligament and the lateral collateral ligament in his left knee during a mini-camp and was placed on the Physically Unable to Perform list. After being activated on November 8, he was limited to seven games, while playing on special teams and as an outside linebacker in the nickel defense.

In 1997, he played as the slot corner in the nickel defense and established himself as one of the best special teams players in the NFL, by leading the team with 26 tackles and earning Pro Bowl consideration. Williams was also recognized as the best cover special teams player in the league, by Paul Zimmerman of Sports Illustrated.

In 1998, he was re-signed by the Cowboys to a two-year contract. He competed for the starting free safety position that was left open after Brock Marion left as a free agent, but it was eventually assigned to George Teague. He missed the season opener while recovering from a broken right thumb. During the year he made his first NFL career starts at cornerback (3), to replace the injured Kevin Smith and Deion Sanders, while finishing with 25 tackles, 7 passes defensed and 14 special teams tackles (fourth on the team).

In 1999, he had 8 starts at cornerback over Kevin Mathis, registering 64 tackles, 11 passes defensed, one forced fumble and one fumble recovery. In 2000, he played in 11 games, missing the first five while recovering from knee surgery. He was not re-signed after the season.
