= Derrick Witherspoon =

American football player (born 1971)

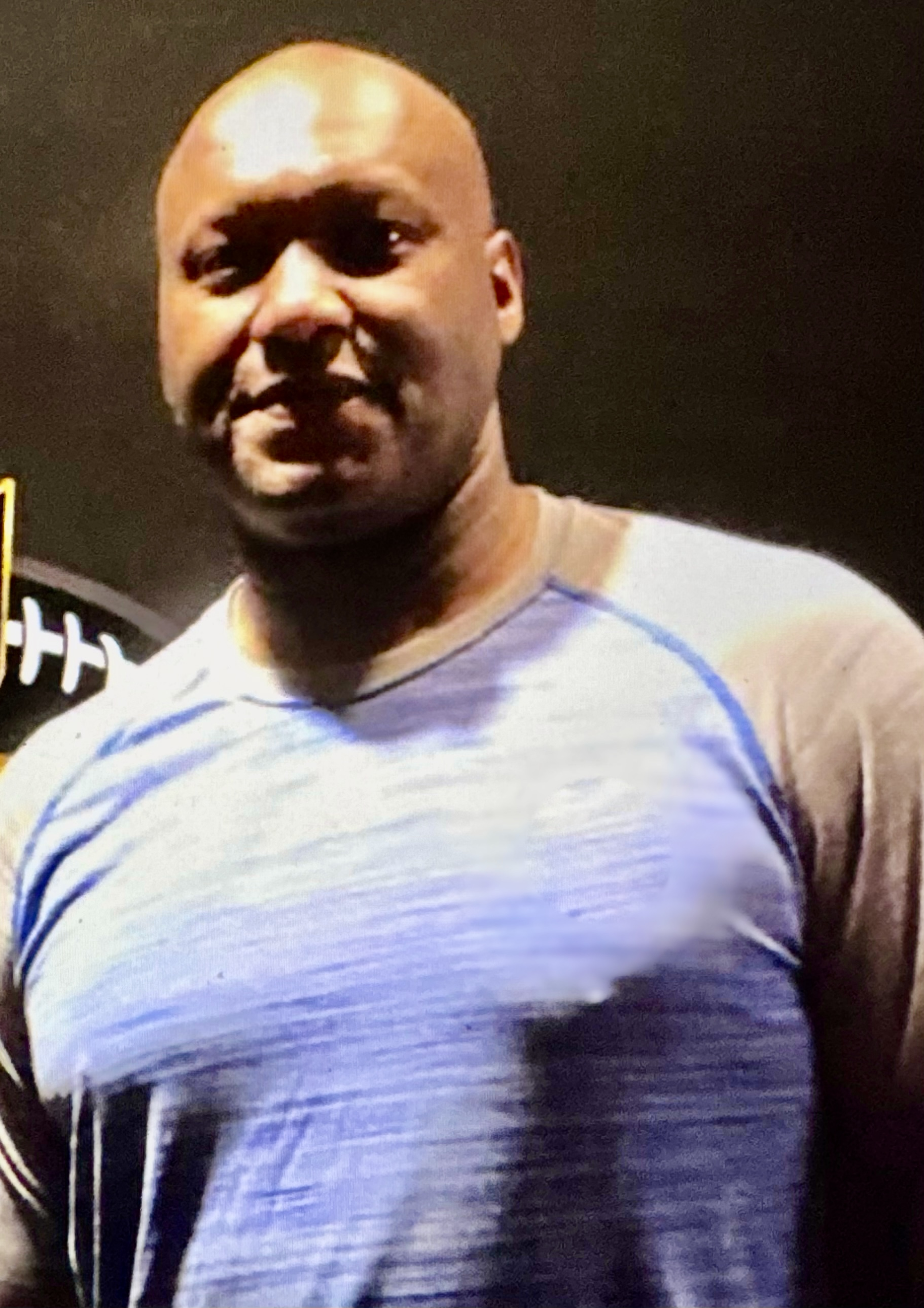

No. 31
- Position: Running back / Return specialist

Personal information
- Born: February 14, 1971 (age 55); Sumter, South Carolina
- Listed height: 5 ft 10 in (1.78 m)
- Listed weight: 196 lb (89 kg)

Career information
- High school: Sumter
- College: Clemson
- NFL draft: 1994: undrafted

Career history
- New England Patriots (1994)*; Shreveport Pirates (1994); Philadelphia Eagles (1995–1997)
- * Offseason or practice squad member only

Career NFL statistics
- Rushing yards: 7
- Return yards: 1,901
- Touchdowns: 3
- Stats at Pro Football Reference

Derrick Leon Witherspoon (born February 14, 1971) is an American former professional football player who was a running back and return specialist in the Canadian Football League (CFL) and National Football League (NFL). He played in the CFL for the Shreveport Pirates and the NFL for the Philadelphia Eagles. He played college football for the Clemson Tigers.

Witherspoon is currently the co-founder and Vice President of the South Carolina Chapter of the NFL Alumni.

== Early life and education ==
Witherspoon played high school football and ran track at Sumter High School.

Football: In 1989–1990, he ended his final high school season with 13 touchdowns and three 2-point conversions (2,063 all-purpose yards, rushed for 1,311 yards on 229 carries for a 5.7 average, and caught 18 passes for 223 yards and a 12.3 average and returned 17 kickoffs for 529 yards with a 31.1 average).

Witherspoon was selected to play for the South team in the North South football game in Myrtle Beach on December 18, 1989.

Track: March 24, 1990, Witherspoon and three of his classmates (Marcus Thomas, Harold McCants and Reggie Williams), won the 400-meter relay with a time of 43:20 at the Sumter Optimist Relays. In the high jump, Witherspoon, and his team, had a three-way tie for first place with a height of 17 feet 8 inches. He came in second in the 100 meter dash, he was passed in the last 10 meters of the run by Manning High School's Micha Spry.

== Collegiate career ==
Witherspoon played football and ran track at Clemson University.

In his fourth game as a freshman, on Saturday, September 22, 1990, against Appalachain State, Witherspoon ran for 81 yards from scrimmage for a touchdown, his first as a college player, and the longest in 40 years in Death Valley. Witherspoon ended that game with 123 yards and 10 carries. He and Ronald Williams ran for a total of 338 yards as first year players in that game.

He placed 7th overall in the 55 meter dash at the ACC Indoor Championships in 1993. As a senior, Witherspoon tried out for all but three teams prior to the NFL draft. While trying out for the Pittsburgh Steelers, Witherspoon had a 42-inch vertical and ran the 40 yard dash in 4.5 seconds.

== Professional career ==
In 1996, during his second year in the NFL with the Philadelphia Eagles, Witherspoon, ran for a total of 1,271 yards as a kick-off returner on special teams and scored two touchdowns. His longest run that season was 97 yards. During the 1996 Philadelphia Eagles Season he was named Special Teams MVP. He was ranked #7 on the Top Ten Eagles kickoff returners of all-time list by The Philly Voice in 2022.

== Legacy and awards ==
He was named one of the greatest running backs in the history of the Midlands by SC Varsity

On December 2, 1989, Witherspoon was named Sumter Daily Item's "Area Player of the Year".

In December 2025, Witherspoon was inducted into the Sumter High School Hall of Fame

== Personal life ==
Witherspoon is married and has two sons and a daughter. His daughter, Kalani Witherspoon is a sprinter/track athlete at the University of North Carolina at Chapel Hill.
