= Greg Jefferson =

American football player and educator (born 1971)

No. 79
- Position: Defensive end

Personal information
- Born: August 31, 1971 (age 55); Orlando, Florida, U.S.
- Listed height: 6 ft 3 in (1.91 m)
- Listed weight: 280 lb (127 kg)

Career information
- High school: Bartow (Bartow, Florida)
- College: UCF
- NFL draft: 1995: 3rd round, 72nd overall pick

Career history
- Philadelphia Eagles (1995–2000); Orlando Predators (2007)

Career NFL statistics
- Total tackles: 160
- Sacks: 13.5
- Fumble recoveries: 3
- Stats at Pro Football Reference

Career AFL statistics
- Total tackles: 1
- Stats at ArenaFan.com

Gregory Benton Jefferson (born August 31, 1971) is an American former professional football player who was a defensive end in the National Football League (NFL). He was selected by the Philadelphia Eagles in the third round of the 1995 NFL draft. He played college football for the UCF Knights. He became a teacher after his football career.

== NFL stats ==
Year	Team	Games	Combined tackles	Tackles	Assisted tackles	Sacks	Forced fumbles	Fumble recoveries
1996	PHI	11	24	13	11	2.5	0	0
1997	PHI	12	45	35	10	3.0	0	1
1998	PHI	15	42	27	15	4.0	0	0
1999	PHI	16	49	40	9	4.0	1	2
Career		54	160	114	46	13.5	1	3

== Personal life ==
Jefferson is currently a teacher for Orange County Public Schools. He has two daughters, both are professional weightlifters who graduated from Ocoee High School.
