= Paul Ricci =

American jazz musician

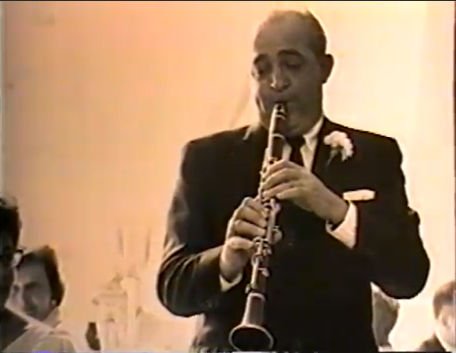

Background information
- Born: April 6, 1914; New York City, New York, U.S.
- Died: January 24, 2001 (aged 86)
- Genres: Jazz
- Instruments: Clarinet, saxophone, flute

Paul J. Ricci (April 6, 1914 – January 24, 2001) was an American jazz reedist.

== Early life ==
Ricci was born in New York City. He played clarinet and saxophone in local dance halls as a teenager.

== Career ==
By the early 1930s, Ricci was playing professionally with Lud Gluskin, Joe Haymes, Bob Howard, Red McKenzie, Red Nichols, Adrian Rollini, and Joe Venuti. He worked extensively as a session musician for recordings and broadcasts from the 1940s through the 1960s, for NBC, Paramount, and Universal. Among his later associations were collaborations with Yank Lawson, Bobby Hackett, Russ Case, Brad Gowans, Jerry Jerome, Herbie Fields, Lucky Millinder, Deane Kincaide, Bob Crosby, Jimmy Dorsey, Jerry Gray, Billy Butterfield, Enoch Light, Carl Kress, Billie Holiday, and the big bands of Dizzy Gillespie and Benny Goodman.
