= Ronnie Dixon =

American football player (born 1971)

No. 95, 90, 98
- Position: Defensive tackle

Personal information
- Born: May 10, 1971 (age 55); Clinton, North Carolina, U.S.
- Listed height: 6 ft 3 in (1.91 m)
- Listed weight: 301 lb (137 kg)

Career information
- High school: Clinton
- College: Cincinnati
- NFL draft: 1993: 6th round, 165th overall pick

Career history
- New Orleans Saints (1993); Cleveland Browns (1995)*; Philadelphia Eagles (1995–1996); New York Jets (1997); Kansas City Chiefs (1998)
- * Offseason or practice squad member only

Career NFL statistics
- Tackles: 48
- Stats at Pro Football Reference

Ronnie Christopher Dixon (born May 10, 1971) is an American former professional football player who was a defensive lineman for four seasons in the National Football League (NFL) for the New Orleans Saints, Philadelphia Eagles, New York Jets, and Kansas City Chiefs. He played college football for the Cincinnati Bearcats and was selected by the Saints in the sixth round of the 1993 NFL draft. He currently lives in Cincinnati, Ohio, where he works as a readymix concrete truck driver.

== Career ==
Dixon was traded on April 18, 1997, by the Eagles to the Jets for the 1997 seventh round pick later used to draft Koy Detmer.
