= Ted Williams (American football coach) =

American football coach and executive

Personal information
- Born: November 17, 1943 (age 82); Lyons, Texas, U.S.

Career information
- College: Cal Poly Pomona

Career history

Coaching
- Compton High School (1968−1979) (Head coach); Los Angeles City (1980) (Head coach); UCLA (1980−1989) (Linebackers/running backs coach); Washington State (1991−1993) (Offensive coordinator/running backs coach); Arizona (1994) (Secondary coach); Philadelphia Eagles (1995−1996) (Tight ends coach); Philadelphia Eagles (1997−2012) (Running backs coach); Philadelphia Eagles (2013−2014) (Tight ends coach)

Operations
- Philadelphia Eagles (2014) (Pro scout)

Ted J. Williams (born November 17, 1943) is an American former football coach who was a position coach with the Philadelphia Eagles of the National Football League (NFL) for 20 seasons from 1995 to 2014. He was also an offensive coordinator for Washington State from 1991 to 1993.

== Coaching career ==
=== High school and college ===
Williams taught and coached at Compton High School in Compton, California from 1968 to 1979 before being hired as the head coaching job at the Los Angeles City College in 1980. Soon after, he took a coaching job at UCLA to coach linebackers and running backs from 1980 to 1989 under Terry Donahue. At UCLA, he coached All-America linebackers Ken Norton and Carnell Lake as well as future NFL running backs Eric Ball, Mel Farr, Jr., Gaston Green, Freeman McNeil and Jairo Penaranda. From 1991 to 1993, Williams was Washington State University's offensive coordinator and running backs coach, coaching future NFL players Drew Bledsoe Robbie Tobeck and Clarence Williams. In 1994, he coached University of Arizona's secondary.

=== Philadelphia Eagles ===
Williams was hired by the Philadelphia Eagles in 1995 to coach the team's tight ends where he stayed from 1995 to 1996. He was shifted to coach the running backs in 1997. Williams had a big role in the drafting of running back Duce Staley. Williams had scouted Staley at the University of South Carolina and recommended the Eagles pick him with their third-round pick in the 1997 NFL draft. Staley went on to have a stellar career with the Eagles, accumulating 4,807 yards on 1,200 carries and 22 touchdowns along with 275 catches for 2,498 yards and 10 touchdowns. Williams was one of only four coaches kept on the coaching staff when Ray Rhodes was fired and replaced with Andy Reid. Williams coached Eagles starting running backs Staley, Correll Buckhalter, Brian Westbrook and LeSean McCoy. Under Williams, the Eagles had seven 1,000-yard rushers, including Staley with three, Westbrook with two, and McCoy with two. Williams moved to tight ends coach after Chip Kelly was hired following the dismissal of Andy Reid. He coached there for two seasons before taking a job within the Eagles pro personnel department in January 2014.

== Personal life ==
Williams is married to his wife, Theresa, and has four children: Darryl, Donald, Daniel and Terri.
