= Gerald Carr (American football) =

American football player and coach (born 1959)

Biographical details
- Born: June 28, 1959 (age 67); Davidson, North Carolina, U.S.
- Education: Southern Illinois

Playing career
- 1977–1980: Southern Illinois
- Position: Quarterback

Coaching career (HC unless noted)

Football
- 1981: North Mecklenburg (assistant)
- 1982: Southern Illinois (GA)
- 1983: Davidson (OBC)
- 1984–1985: Davidson (WR/AC)
- 1986–1988: Akron (Multiple positions)
- 1989–1990: Washington State (WR)
- 1991: Arizona (QB)
- 1992–1994: North Carolina (QB)
- 1995–1998: Philadelphia Eagles (WR)
- 1999: Wake Forest (WR)
- 2000: Carolina Cobras (OC/QB/WR)
- 2001: Indiana (QB/PGC)
- 2002: Kentucky (RB/AHC)
- 2003–2005: Baylor (RB/AHC)
- 2006: Buffalo (OC/QB)
- 2011: Southern (OC/QB)
- 2011–2012: Virginia Destroyers (RB)

Baseball
- 1981: North Mecklenburg JV

Accomplishments and honors

Championships
- 1× UFL (2011)

Gerald N. Carr (born June 28, 1959) is an American former football quarterback and coach. He played college football at Southern Illinois before starting a coaching career that spanned from 1981–2012 with North Mecklenburg High School, Southern Illinois, Davidson, Akron, Washington State, Arizona, North Carolina, the Philadelphia Eagles, Wake Forest, the Carolina Cobras, Indiana, Kentucky, Baylor, Buffalo, Southern, and the Virginia Destroyers.

== Early life and education ==
Carr was born on June 28, 1959, in Davidson, North Carolina. He went to high school in Huntersville, North Carolina, at North Mecklenburg. He was offered a full scholarship from Southern Illinois University following high school. After his first season, Carr left the school's football team upon his family's request. He rejoined the team early in the 1978 season following an injury to starting quarterback John Cernak. In the team's final practice game before the season, Carr completed 11 of 18 passes for 154 yards and two touchdowns. After starting a few games, he was replaced by Arthur Williams.

He did not play much again until October 1979, when he came off the bench and led Illinois to a 31–7 victory over Wichita State. His teammate Joe Barwinski said Carr "was tearing Wichita State apart". The Southern Illinoisan reported, "Every time Wichita State penetrated the Salukis' pass protection and closed in on Carr, off he'd go, darting and dancing away from would-be tacklers. The whole scene, hilarious at times, was reminiscent of the old "Roadrunner" shows, where the coyote gets foiled every time." Carr was the team captain in his senior year, 1980. He graduated with a Bachelor of Science.

== Coaching career ==
Rather than pursue a career in professional football, Carr returned home to Huntersville and became a coach at North Mecklenburg High School, serving as assistant football coach and head coach of the JV baseball team. Under his coaching, the JV baseball team compiled a 16–1 record in the season. He also was a substitute teacher in Mecklenburg's school program.

Afterwards he returned to Southern Illinois University, and served as a graduate assistant during the 1982 season while working towards a master's degree. In 1983, Carr was hired by the Davidson Wildcats to be their offensive backfield coach. He was the team's receivers coach and academic coordinator from 1984–1985.

In 1986, he was given a position by the Akron Zips college football team. He coached from 1986–1988 at Akron, serving as academic coordinator, quarterbacks coach, receivers coach, and tight ends coach during his three seasons with the school. Carr left Akron and was hired as the receivers coach of Washington State in 1989.

On January 10, 1991, Arizona Wildcats football coach Dick Tomey announced he had signed Carr to be the Wildcats' quarterbacks coach. Tomey said, "Gerald will give us some ability to be more explosive in our passing offense, because he came from an explosive offense at WSU." The Wildcats compiled a 4–7 record in the 1991 season.

Carr left Arizona after one season, and joined the North Carolina Tar Heels in the same position. He spent three seasons, from 1992–1994, with the Tar Heels, helping them achieve a 10–3 record in 1993.

After three seasons, he joined the professional Philadelphia Eagles of the National Football League (NFL). He was given the position of wide receivers coach, and was hired in February 1995 by Ray Rhodes. After his first season, the Eagles acquired Irving Fryar, who he coached to Pro Bowl seasons in 1996 and 1997. Fryar set the franchise record for single-season receptions in 1996. Carr was fired following the 1998 season.

After his departure from the Eagles, Carr was given a position as the receivers coach for the Wake Forest Demon Deacons football team. He left after one season to join the Carolina Cobras of the Arena Football League (AFL). He served as the team's offensive coordinator, quarterbacks coach, and wide receivers coach during 2000. He joined the Indiana Hoosiers following the season, and served as their passing game coordinator and quarterbacks coach.

On February 11, 2002, Carr joined the Kentucky Wildcats to be their running backs coach. Guy Morriss gave him the task of assistant coach before the season started. Morriss said, "Gerald has earned the respect of the players already in the short time he has been here. I like the way he has handled the players very demanding, but fair. He's also proven that he is a good, knowledgeable coach."

Carr spent one season at Kentucky before spending 2003–2005 at Baylor University. He served as the school's assistant head coach and running backs coach. He resigned in December 2005. He was replaced by Wes Phillips. In 2006, he was announced as offensive coordinator and quarterbacks coach for the Buffalo Bulls. He left Buffalo in January 2007.

He retired until 2011, when he accepted an offer to be the Southern Jaguars' offensive coordinator and quarterbacks coach. He left before the season began to join the Virginia Destroyers of the United Football League (UFL). He spent two seasons as their running backs coach, winning the 2011 UFL championship game before retiring from coaching. Running back Dominic Rhodes won UFL player of the year in 2011.

== Later life ==
After Carr's coaching career he founded a construction company called All-Pro Builders.
