= Ray Rhodes =

American football player and coach (born 1950)

No. 82, 22, 26
- Position: Cornerback

Personal information
- Born: October 20, 1950 (age 76); Mexia, Texas, U.S.
- Listed height: 5 ft 11 in (1.80 m)
- Listed weight: 185 lb (84 kg)

Career information
- High school: Mexia
- College: TCU (1970); Tulsa (1972–1973)
- NFL draft: 1974: 10th round, 236th overall pick

Career history

Playing
- New York Giants (1974–1979); San Francisco 49ers (1980)

Coaching
- San Francisco 49ers (1981–1991); Assistant defensive backs coach; (1981–1982); Defensive backs coach; (1983–1991); Green Bay Packers (1992–1993) Defensive coordinator; San Francisco 49ers (1994) Defensive coordinator; Philadelphia Eagles (1995–1998) Head coach; Green Bay Packers (1999) Head coach; Washington Redskins (2000) Defensive coordinator; Denver Broncos (2001–2002) Defensive coordinator; Seattle Seahawks (2003–2007) Defensive coordinator; Houston Texans (2008–2010) Defensive assistant; Cleveland Browns (2011–2012) Defensive assistant

Awards and highlights
- As head coach: AP NFL Coach of the Year (1995); Sporting News Coach of the Year (1995); Pro Football Weekly Coach of the Year (1995); Greasy Neale Award (1995); As assistant coach: 5× Super Bowl champion (XVI, XIX, XXIII, XXIV, XXIX)

Head coaching record
- Regular season: 37–42–1 (.469)
- Postseason: 1–2 (.333)
- Career: 38–44–1 (.464)
- Coaching profile at Pro Football Reference
- Stats at Pro Football Reference

Raymond Earl Rhodes (born October 20, 1950) is an American former professional football player and coach in the National Football League (NFL). Rhodes played wide receiver and cornerback for the New York Giants and the San Francisco 49ers. He served as the head coach of the Philadelphia Eagles and the Green Bay Packers, as well as the former assistant defensive backs coach of the Houston Texans. He earned five Super Bowl rings as an assistant coach with the San Francisco 49ers, and was named Coach of the Year by the Associated Press in 1995, his first season as Eagles head coach. He last served as the senior defensive assistant for the Cleveland Browns.

== Playing career ==
=== High school ===
Born and raised in Mexia, Texas, Rhodes graduated from Mexia High School in 1969, and was a letterman in football, basketball, and track and field. He transferred from crosstown Dunbar High School after his sophomore year.

=== College ===
Rhodes was a running back at Texas Christian University in Fort Worth for two seasons, then transferred to the University of Tulsa, where he played wide receiver and cornerback. In his two seasons, he had totals of 729 rushing yards, 558 receiving yards and 501 kickoff return yards for a 26.4 average per return; he had three 100+ yard rushing games. In 2023, he was inducted into the Tulsa Athletic Hall of Fame.

=== NFL ===
Rhodes was selected by the New York Giants in the tenth round of the 1974 NFL draft, 236th overall. He spent his first three years in the NFL as a wide receiver before switching to cornerback. In 1979, he was traded to the San Francisco 49ers for Tony Dungy, another future head coach. He retired after one season with the 49ers.

== Coaching career ==
=== NFL ===
==== Assistant coach ====
Rhodes remained with the 49ers as an assistant secondary coach before becoming defensive backs coach. He won four Super Bowls with a group that included Ronnie Lott, Eric Wright, and Dwight Hicks. After serving that position for many years, he was hired by former colleague Mike Holmgren to be the new defensive coordinator for the Green Bay Packers. After two years Rhodes returned to San Francisco as the defensive coordinator of their 1994 Super Bowl-winning team.

Following his head coaching jobs, Rhodes served as the defensive coordinator for the Washington Redskins and the Denver Broncos. After the 2002 season, Rhodes was reunited with Holmgren when he became the defensive coordinator for the Seattle Seahawks, where he remained through the 2007 season.

In September 2005, Rhodes was hospitalized for dizziness and tests later revealed that he had suffered from a mild stroke. Early Monday October 2, 2006, the Seahawks charter flight had to make an emergency landing in Rapid City, South Dakota to get precautionary medical care for Rhodes. The Seahawks were flying home from a loss at the Chicago Bears.

On January 28, 2008, Ray Rhodes joined his sixth NFL organization when he was hired by the Houston Texans as an assistant defensive backs coach.

==== Head coach ====
===== Philadelphia Eagles =====
On February 2, 1995, five days after the 49ers won Super Bowl XXIX, Ray Rhodes was named head coach of the Philadelphia Eagles, becoming the fourth African-American head coach in NFL history behind Fritz Pollard, Art Shell and Dennis Green. Rhodes gained notoriety for his no-nonsense approach and unusual ways of motivating his players. One such tactic was an analogy "comparing the feeling of a loss to someone breaking into (one's) home and sodomizing (one's) horses and kids."

In Rhodes's first season, he received the NFL Coach of the Year Award as the Eagles overcame a 1–3 start to finish 10–6 and qualify for the playoffs as a wild card. Despite playing the first-round game at home, the Eagles were an underdog to the Detroit Lions, whose starting left tackle, Lomas Brown, guaranteed an easy win. Using this perceived lack of respect as a rallying cry, Philadelphia dismantled Detroit, 58–37, at one point leading the game by a 51–7 score. Rhodes said after the victory that the only things guaranteed in life are "death and taxes." Though the Eagles were eliminated by the Dallas Cowboys the following week, the 1995 season was considered an enormous success.

In 1996, the Eagles again finished 10–6, but struggled down the stretch after an impressive 7–2 start. Once again, Philadelphia reached the playoffs as a wild card, traveling to San Francisco to face the 49ers, Rhodes's former team. At a rain-soaked 3Com Park, the Eagles, who boasted the top-ranked offense in the NFC during the regular season, were shut out, 14–0.

During training camp in 1997, Rhodes remarked that season's Eagles team was his most talented one to date. Despite the optimism, Philadelphia started 1–3, and never quite recovered, stumbling to a disappointing 6–9–1 record, including an 0–7–1 mark on the road. As the team struggled through the season, it was widely speculated that players had grown weary of Rhodes's fiery approach and were tuning him out.

The 1998 season proved to be a disaster. A listless Eagles team finished 3–13, setting a franchise record for losses in a season. For the second straight season, Philadelphia did not win a road game, going 0–8 away from home. The offense, which ranked first in the NFC two years earlier, finished dead last in the NFL. The Eagles were shut out three times and scored only 161 total points. On December 28, one day after the season's final game, Rhodes was fired as Philadelphia's head coach. In four seasons as the Eagles' head coach, Rhodes compiled a 29–34–1 record in the regular season and a 1–2 record in the playoffs.

===== Green Bay Packers =====
The Green Bay Packers were looking for a new coach after Mike Holmgren had left to become head coach and general manager of the Seattle Seahawks. Green Bay GM Ron Wolf was a fan of Rhodes's coaching style. On January 11, 1999, Rhodes was hired to coach the Packers after being the only candidate to interview for the position.

Rhodes's tenure as head coach lasted only one season. They started off with wins in four of their first six games before meeting Holmgren's Seahawks. Seattle thrashed Green Bay 27–7 in what was the first loss of six in a nine-game span. Rhodes spent the season under heavy scrutiny by the Wisconsin sports media, beginning with accusations of underachieving. One particular loss served as a lightning rod for criticism (such as ESPN's Paul Maguire). Green Bay was trying to protect a 31–27 lead over the Carolina Panthers, who had the ball at their own 37-yard line with four minutes remaining. A would-be touchdown was instead overruled by replay that instead had Green Bay stay on the field. Rhodes failed to use a timeout at any point (Carolina used all three during the four minute drive) that eventually resulted in Carolina win on a quarterback run as time expired. The loss was the third at home for the season, the most for a Packer team since 1991. The Packers would ultimately finish 8–8, which would be their only non-winning season between 1992 and 2004. Green Bay missed the playoffs for the first time since 1992, based on a tiebreaker system (Detroit and Dallas reached the playoffs with 8–8 records, while Green Bay and the Carolina Panthers did not).

On January 3, 2000, Rhodes was fired by the Packers, and subsequently replaced by Mike Sherman. Months later, Rhodes accused the team of setting him up to fail, stating that Wolf had hired him into "a situation where there was an overestimation of the talent there." He also stated his regrets in expecting his players to be responsible and trying to treat them the way Rhodes wanted to be treated when he was a player.

== Head coaching record ==
Team	Year	Regular season					Postseason			
Team	Year	Won	Lost	Ties	Win %	Finish	Won	Lost	Win %	Result
PHI	1995	10	6	0	.625	2nd in NFC East	1	1	.500	Lost to Dallas Cowboys in NFC Divisional Game
PHI	1996	10	6	0	.625	2nd in NFC East	0	1	.000	Lost to San Francisco 49ers in NFC Wild Card Game
PHI	1997	6	9	1	.400	3rd in NFC East	-	-	-	-
PHI	1998	3	13	0	.188	5th in NFC East	-	-	-	-
PHI Total		29	34	1	.460		1	2	.333	
GB	1999	8	8	0	.500	4th in NFC Central	-	-	-	-
GB Total		8	8	0	.500		-	-	-	
Total		37	42	1	.468		1	2	.333	

== Personal life ==
Rhodes and his wife, Carmen, have four daughters.

While in Philadelphia, Rhodes spent a lot of time enjoying his favorite hobby, horse racing. He appeared regularly on Courier-Post's "Dusty Nathan's Winner's Circle" radio show.

In September 2005, Rhodes suffered a stroke while at his suburban Seattle home. During the 2006 season, Rhodes suffered from stroke-like symptoms while on the Seahawks' team flight home from a game at Chicago; the plane made an emergency landing in South Dakota due to the incident.

Rhodes and his family currently reside in San Francisco, California.
