= Sylvester Wright =

American football player (born 1971)

No. 52, 55
- Positions: Defensive end, linebacker

Personal information
- Born: December 30, 1971 (age 54); Detroit, Michigan, U.S.
- Listed height: 6 ft 2 in (1.88 m)
- Listed weight: 258 lb (117 kg)

Career information
- High school: Mackenzie (Detroit)
- College: Kansas
- NFL draft: 1995: undrafted

Career history
- Philadelphia Eagles (1995–1996); Frankfurt Galaxy (1998)

Career NFL statistics
- Tackles: 4
- Stats at Pro Football Reference

Sylvester Wright (born December 30, 1971) is an American former professional football player who was a defensive end and linebacker for the Philadelphia Eagles of the National Football League (NFL) from 1995 to 1996. He played college football for the Kansas Jayhawks.
