= Troy Drake =

American football player (born 1972)

No. 75, 70
- Position: Offensive tackle

Personal information
- Born: May 15, 1972 (age 54); Byron, Illinois, U.S.
- Listed height: 6 ft 6 in (1.98 m)
- Listed weight: 294 lb (133 kg)

Career information
- College: Indiana

Career history
- 1995–1997: Philadelphia Eagles
- 1998: Washington Redskins
- Stats at Pro Football Reference

Troy Adam Drake (born May 15, 1972) is an American former professional football offensive tackle in the National Football League (NFL) for the Philadelphia Eagles and Washington Redskins. He played college football at Indiana University Bloomington.
