= 1994 Los Angeles Rams season =

NFL team season (last season in Los Angeles until 2016)

- Owner: Georgia Frontiere
- General manager: John Shaw
- Head coach: Chuck Knox
- Offensive coordinator: Chris Harris
- Defensive coordinator: George Dyer
- Home stadium: Anaheim Stadium (since 1980)

Results
- Record: 4–12
- Division place: 4th NFC West
- Playoffs: Did not qualify
- Pro Bowlers: Jerome Bettis, RB

Uniform
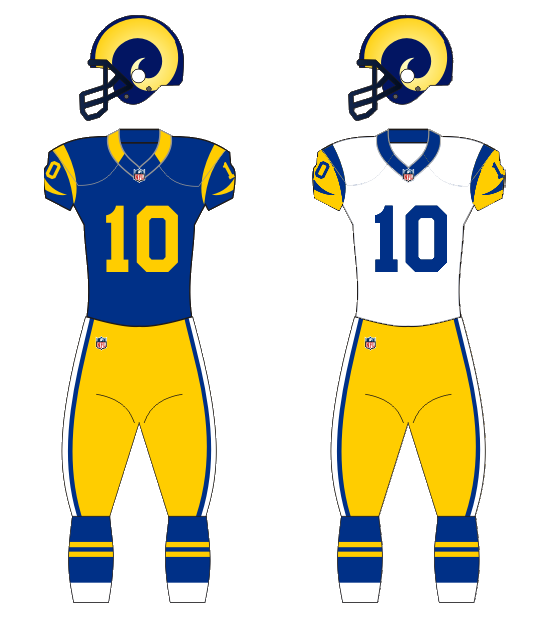

The 1994 Los Angeles Rams season was the franchise's 57th season in the National Football League, their 58th overall, and their 49th and final in the Greater Los Angeles Area until their 2016 relocation back to Los Angeles. After nearly 50 years in the Greater Los Angeles Area, including 15 seasons at Anaheim Stadium, owner Georgia Frontiere announced that the team would relocate to St. Louis, Missouri on January 15, 1995. While the owners initially rejected the move, permission was eventually granted therefore bringing an end to Southern California's first major professional sports franchise until 2016.

The threat of relocation dominated talk about the Rams from early in the offseason right up to the moment the move was announced and it had a major effect on the franchise's standing in the market. Average attendance for Rams games at Anaheim Stadium was at an all-time low (an average of 43,312 a game) as ownership negotiated with both Baltimore and St. Louis. Leigh Steinberg organized a group known as "Save the Rams" and attempted to reach out to ownership and strike a deal to keep the team in the Southern California market, however, their efforts proved to be unsuccessful.

On the field, the Rams continued their downward spiral and missed the postseason for the fifth consecutive season. Los Angeles only won four games and clinched their fifth losing season in a row on December 4 against the New Orleans Saints and finished the season on a seven-game losing streak. The Rams defense saw some glimmers of hope, shutting out Joe Montana's Chiefs and putting together solid performances against Arizona and New York, but it was not nearly enough to lift the Rams back to the .500 mark. At the end of the season, head coach Chuck Knox was fired after three consecutive last place finishes in the NFC West and Frontiere also relieved John Shaw of his General Manager duties, although he remained with the team as a high-ranking executive.

== Offseason ==
=== 1994 draft class ===
1994 Los Angeles Rams draft
Round	Selection	Player	Position	College
1	15	Wayne Gandy	Tackle	Auburn
2	33	Isaac Bruce	Wide receiver	Memphis
2	49	Toby Wright	Safety	Nebraska
2	56	Brad Ottis	Defensive end	Wayne State
3	71	Keith Lyle	Safety	Virginia
3	83	James Bostic	Running back	Auburn
3	100	Ernest Jones	Linebacker	Oregon
4	108	Chris Brantley	Wide receiver	Rutgers
6	167	Rickey Brady	Tight end	Oklahoma
6	189	Ronald Edwards	Tackle	North Carolina A&T

=== Undrafted free agents ===
1994 undrafted free agents of note
Player	Position	College
D'Marco Farr	Defensive tackle	Washington
Kevin McDougal	Quarterback	Notre Dame

== Personnel ==
=== Staff ===
1994 Los Angeles Rams staff
Front office: Owner/president – Georgia Frontiere; Executive vice-president – John Shaw; Senior vice-president – Jay Zygmunt; Administrator of football operations – Jack Faulkner; Director of player personnel – John Becker; Head coaches: Vice-president/head coach – Chuck Knox; Assistant head coach/safeties – Joe Vitt; Offensive coaches: Offensive coordinator/running backs – Chick Harris; Quarterbacks – Mike Martz; Wide receivers – Steve Moore; Tight ends – Rennie Simmons; Offensive line – Jim Erkenbeck; Offensive assistant – Chuck Knox Jr.	Defensive coaches: Defensive coordinator/defensive line – George Dyer; Linebackers – Dick Selcer; Defensive backs – Rod Perry; Defensive assistant – Greg Gaines; Special teams coaches: Special teams – Wayne Sevier; Strength and conditioning: Strength and conditioning – Chris Clausen

=== Team roster ===
1994 Los Angeles Rams roster
Quarterbacks (QB): 8 Tommy Maddox; 9 Jamie Martin; 13 Chris Miller; 17 Chris Chandler; Running backs (RB): 28 Johnny Bailey; 30 Howard Griffith FB; 34 Tim Lester; 36 Jerome Bettis; 38 David Lang KR; Wide receivers (WR): 81 Todd Kinchen; 82 Jermaine Ross; 83 Flipper Anderson; 86 Jessie Hester; 88 Chris Brantley KR; Tight ends (TE): 48 Rickey Brady; 84 Troy Drayton; 87 Ron Middleton	Offensive linemen (OL): 51 Blair Bush; 61 Bern Brostek C; 66 Tom Newberry C/G; 70 Wayne Gandy T; 71 Chuck Belin G; 72 Clarence Jones T; 77 Darryl Ashmore G/T; 78 Jackie Slater T; 79 Leo Goeas G; Defensive linemen (DL): 60 Fred Stokes DE; 76 Robert Young DE; 90 Sean Gilbert DT; 92 David Rocker DT; 95 Brad Ottis DE/DT; 96 Jay Williams DE; 97 Gerald Robinson DE; 98 Jimmie Jones DT	Linebackers (LB): 52 Joe Kelly OLB; 53 Chris Martin OLB; 54 Brett Collins OLB; 56 Shane Conlan MLB; 57 Thomas Homco; 58 Roman Phifer OLB; 59 Henry Rolling OLB; Defensive backs (DB): 20 Darryl Henley CB; 22 Marquez Pope SS; 24 Wymon Henderson CB/S; 26 Anthony Newman FS; 28 Robert Bailey CB; 29 Dexter Davis CB; 31 Steve Israel CB; 32 Toby Wright FS; 35 Keith Lyle SS; 41 Todd Lyght CB; Special teams (ST): 5 Sean Landeta P; 10 Tony Zendejas	Practice squad: 68 Brad Fichtel C; 55 Paul Liggett MLB; —- Tony Harrison WR; -- Roosevelt Patterson G; Reserve: 33 James Bostic RB (IR); 80 Isaac Bruce WR (IR); 89 Richard Buchanan WR (IR); 75 D'Marco Farr DT (IR); 50 Ernest Jones DE (IR); 64 Keith Loneker G (IR); 53 active, 6 inactive, 3 practice squad Rookies in italics

== Preseason ==
=== Schedule ===
Week	Date	Opponent	Result	Record	Venue	Recap
1	August 6	at Green Bay Packers	L 6–14	0–1	Camp Randall Stadium	Recap
2	August 13	New England Patriots	L 10–28	0–2	Anaheim Stadium	Recap
3	August 20	Los Angeles Raiders	L 20–29	0–3	Anaheim Stadium	Recap
4	August 25	at San Diego Chargers	L 6–24	0–4	Jack Murphy Stadium	Recap

== Regular season ==
=== Schedule ===
Week	Date	Opponent	Result	Record	Venue	Recap
1	September 4	Arizona Cardinals	**W** 14–12	1–0	Anaheim Stadium	Recap
2	September 11	at **Atlanta Falcons**	**L** 13–31	1–1	Georgia Dome	Recap
3	September 18	**San Francisco 49ers**	**L** 19–34	1–2	Anaheim Stadium	Recap
4	September 25	at Kansas City Chiefs	**W** 16–0	2–2	Arrowhead Stadium	Recap
5	October 2	**Atlanta Falcons**	**L** 5–8	2–3	Anaheim Stadium	Recap
6	October 9	at Green Bay Packers	**L** 17–24	2–4	Lambeau Field	Recap
7	October 16	New York Giants	**W** 17–10	3–4	Anaheim Stadium	Recap
8	October 23	at **New Orleans Saints**	**L** 34–37	3–5	Louisiana Superdome	Recap
9	Bye					
10	November 6	Denver Broncos	**W** 27–21	4–5	Anaheim Stadium	Recap
11	November 13	Los Angeles Raiders	**L** 17–20	4–6	Anaheim Stadium	Recap
12	November 20	at **San Francisco 49ers**	**L** 27–31	4–7	Candlestick Park	Recap
13	November 27	at San Diego Chargers	**L** 17–31	4–8	Jack Murphy Stadium	Recap
14	December 4	**New Orleans Saints**	**L** 15–31	4–9	Anaheim Stadium	Recap
15	December 11	at Tampa Bay Buccaneers	**L** 14–24	4–10	Tampa Stadium	Recap
16	December 18	at Chicago Bears	**L** 13–27	4–11	Soldier Field	Recap
17	December 24	Washington Redskins	**L** 21–24	4–12	Anaheim Stadium	Recap
Note: Intra-division opponents are in **bold** text.

== Game summaries ==
=== Week 1 ===
Week One: Arizona Cardinals (0–0) at Los Angeles Rams (0–0)

Quarter	1	2	3	4	Total
Cardinals	0	6	6	0	12
Rams	7	0	7	0	14

at Anaheim Stadium, Anaheim, California

- Date: Sunday, September 4
- Game time: 1:00 p.m. PDT
- Game weather: 70 °F (21.1 °C), wind 8 miles per hour (13 km/h; 7.0 kn)
- Game attendance: 32,969 (47.78% full)
- Referee: Bernie Kukar
- TV: FOX
- Pro-Football-Reference.com
  Rams Wake Up and Show Buddy How to Play Ball (LA Times)

Game information

First quarter

- LA – Todd Lyght 74 yard fumble return (Tony Zendejas kick) – Rams 7–0

Second quarter

- ARI – Greg Davis 37 yard field goal – Rams 7–3
- ARI – Greg Davis 34 yard field goal – Rams 7–6

Third quarter

- LA – Jerome Bettis 1 yard rush (Tony Zendejas kick) – Rams 14–6
- ARI – Larry Centers 3 yard pass from Steve Beuerlein (pass failed) – Rams 14–12

Cardinals

- Steve Beuerlein—18/40, 158 Yds, 1 TD, 2 INT
- Ronald Moore—13 Rush, 65 Yds
- Gary Clark—4 Rec, 55 Yds

Rams

- Chris Miller—6/16, 131 Yds, 0 TD, 1 INT
- Jerome Bettis—21 Rush, 52 Yds
- Flipper Anderson—1 Rec, 44 Yds

=== Week 2 ===
Week Two: Los Angeles Rams (1–0) at Atlanta Falcons (0–1)

Quarter	1	2	3	4	Total
Rams	0	7	0	6	13
Falcons	14	3	7	7	31

at Georgia Dome, Atlanta

- Date: Sunday, September 11
- Game time: 10:00 a.m. PDT
- Game weather: Played indoors (dome stadium)
- Game attendance: 55,378 (77.75% full)
- TV: Fox
- Pro-Football-Reference.com
  Rams Leave Atlanta With Rison to Believe (LA Times)

Game information

First quarter

- ATL – Terance Mathis 2 yard pass from Jeff George (Norm Johnson kick) – Falcons 7–0
- ATL – Andre Rison 16 yard pass from Jeff George (Norm Johnson kick) – Falcons 14–0

Second quarter

- LA – Isaac Bruce 34 yard pass from Chris Miller (Tony Zendejas kick) – Falcons 14–7
- ATL – Norm Johnson 48 yard field goal – Falcons 17–7

Third quarter

- ATL – Darnell Walker 44 yard interception return (Norm Johnson kick) – Falcons 24–7

Fourth quarter

- ATL – Andre Rison 16 yard pass from Jeff George (Norm Johnson kick) – Falcons 31–7
- LA – Flipper Anderson 41 yard pass from Chris Chandler (pass failed) – Falcons 31–13

Rams

- Chris Miller—10/20, 187 Yds, 1 TD, 3 INT
- Jerome Bettis—24 Rush, 102 Yds
- Flipper Anderson—5 Rec, 154 Yds

Falcons

- Jeff George—29/38, 287 Yds, 3 TD, 0 INT
- Craig Heyward—9 Rush, 68 Yds
- Andre Rison—12 Rec, 123 Yds

=== Week 3 ===
Week Three: San Francisco 49ers (1–1) at Los Angeles Rams (1–1)

Quarter	1	2	3	4	Total
49ers	10	7	3	14	34
Rams	7	3	0	9	19

at Anaheim Stadium, Anaheim, California

- Date: Sunday, September 18
- Game time: 1:00 p.m. PDT
- Game weather: 67 °F (19.4 °C), wind 8 miles per hour (13 km/h; 7.0 kn)
- Game attendance: 56,479 (81.84% full)
- TV: Fox
- Pro-Football-Reference.com
  Sorry Georgia, but 49ers Own Rams (LA Times)

Game information

First quarter

- SF – John Taylor 3 yard pass from Steve Young (Doug Brien kick) – 49ers 7–0
- LA – Troy Drayton 4 yard pass from Chris Miller (Tony Zendejas kick) – Tied 7–7
- SF – Doug Brien 33 yard field goal – 49ers 10–7

Second quarter

- LA – Tony Zendejas 25 yard field goal – Tied 10–10
- SF – Steve Young 1 yard rush (Doug Brien kick) – 49ers 17–10

Third quarter

- SF – Doug Brien 47 yard field goal – 49ers 20–10

Fourth quarter

- SF – Jerry Rice 1 yard pass from Steve Young (Doug Brien kick) – 49ers 27–10
- LA – Tony Zendejas 35 yard field goal – 49ers 27–13
- SF – Steve Young 1 yard rush (Doug Brien kick) – 49ers 34–13
- LA – Jerome Bettis 2 yard rush (pass failed) – 49ers 34–19

49ers

- Steve Young—31/39, 187 Yds, 2 TD, 0 INT
- Ricky Watters—18 Rush, 56 Yds
- Jerry Rice—11 Rec, 147 Yds

Rams

- Chris Chandler—9/15, 87 Yds, 0 TD, 0 INT
- Jerome Bettis—21 Rush, 104 Yds
- Jessie Hester—4 Rec, 58 Yds

=== Week 4 ===
Week Four: Los Angeles Rams (1–2) at Kansas City Chiefs (3–0)

Quarter	1	2	3	4	Total
Rams	13	0	3	0	16
Chiefs	0	0	0	0	0

at Arrowhead Stadium, Kansas City, Missouri

- Date: Sunday, September 25
- Game time: 10:00 a.m. PDT
- Game weather: 58 °F (14.4 °C), wind 13 miles per hour (21 km/h; 11 kn)
- Game attendance: 78,184 (100.11% full)
- TV: Fox
- Pro-Football-Reference.com
  Montana, Chiefs Have Nothing on Rams (LA Times)

Game information

First quarter

- LA – Tony Zendejas 29 yard field goal – Rams 3–0
- LA – Flipper Anderson 72 yard pass from Chris Chandler (Tony Zendejas kick) – Rams 10–0
- LA – Tony Zendejas 23 yard field goal – Rams 13–0

Third quarter

- LA – Tony Zendejas 28 yard field goal – Rams 16–0

Rams

- Chris Chandler—13/21, 207 Yds, 1 TD, 0 INT
- Jerome Bettis—35 Rush, 132 Yds
- Flipper Anderson—2 Rec, 83 Yds

Chiefs

- Joe Montana—18/37, 175 Yds, 0 TD, 3 INT
- Marcus Allen—15 Rush, 59 Yds
- Willie Davis—5 Rec, 74 Yds

=== Week 5 ===
Week Five: Atlanta Falcons (2–2) at Los Angeles Rams (2–2)

Quarter	1	2	3	4	Total
Falcons	0	0	0	8	8
Rams	0	2	3	0	5

at Anaheim Stadium, Anaheim, California

- Date: Sunday, October 2
- Game time: 1:00 p.m. PDT
- Game weather: 66 °F (18.9 °C), wind 8 miles per hour (13 km/h; 7.0 kn)
- Game attendance: 34,599 (50.14% full)
- TV: Fox
- Pro-Football-Reference.com
  Rams Come Up Short in Battle of Backups (LA Times)

Game information

Second quarter

- LA – Safety, Sean Gilbert tackled Jeff George in end zone – Rams 2–0

Third quarter

- LA – Tony Zendejas 28 yard field goal – Rams 5–0

Fourth quarter

- ATL – R. Sanders 13 yd pass from B. Hebert (T. Mathis pass from B. Hebert) – Falcons 8–5

Falcons

- Jeff George—16/25, 190 Yds, 0 TD, 1 INT
- Erric Pegram—13 Rush, 45 Yds
- Bert Emanuel—6 Rec, 86 Yds

Rams

- Tommy Maddox—7/18, 86 Yds, 0 TD, 2 INT
- Jerome Bettis—29 Rush, 117 Yds
- Johnny Bailey—5 Rec, 54 Yds

=== Week 6 ===
Week Six: Los Angeles Rams (2–3) at Green Bay Packers (2–3)

Quarter	1	2	3	4	Total
Rams	7	10	0	0	17
Packers	3	0	14	7	24

at Lambeau Field, Green Bay, Wisconsin

- Date: Sunday, October 9
- Game time: 10:00 a.m. PDT
- Game weather: 47 °F (8.3 °C), wind 12 miles per hour (19 km/h; 10 kn)
- Game attendance: 58,911 (98.94% full)
- TV: Fox
- Pro-Football-Reference.com
  For Rams, It All Goes Right, Then It All Goes Wrong (LA Times)

Game information

First quarter

- LA – Troy Drayton 2 yard pass from Chris Miller (Tony Zendejas kick) – Rams 7–0
- GB – Chris Jacke 25 yard field goal – Rams 7–3

Second quarter

- LA – Troy Drayton 4 yard pass from Chris Miller (Tony Zendejas kick) – Rams 14–3
- LA – Tony Zendejas 37 yard field goal – Rams 17–3

Third quarter

- GB – Sterling Sharpe 8 yard pass from Brett Favre (Chris Jacke kick) – Rams 17–10
- GB – Robert Brooks 85 yard punt return (Chris Jacke kick) – Packers 17–17

Fourth quarter

- GB – Edgar Bennett 1 yard rush (Chris Jacke kick) – Packers 17–24

Rams

- Chris Miller—18/29, 166 Yds, 2 TD, 1 INT
- Jerome Bettis—22 Rush, 65 Yds
- Flipper Anderson—4 Rec, 73 Yds

Packers

- Brett Favre—25/41, 222 Yds, 1 TD, 1 INT
- Reggie Cobb—11 Rush, 37 Yds
- Sterling Sharpe—7 Rec, 62 Yds

=== Week 7 ===
Week Seven: New York Giants (3–2) at Los Angeles Rams (3–3)

Quarter	1	2	3	4	Total
Giants	7	3	0	0	10
Rams	14	3	0	0	17

at Anaheim Stadium, Anaheim, California

- Date: Sunday, October 16
- Game time: 1:00 p.m. PDT
- Game weather: 65 °F (18.3 °C), wind 11 miles per hour (18 km/h; 9.6 kn)
- Game attendance: 40,474 (58.65% full)
- TV: Fox
- Pro-Football-Reference.com
  Defense Pushes Rams Around Corner, 17-10 (LA Times)

Game information

First quarter

- LA – Isaac Bruce 19 yard pass from Chris Miller (Tony Zendejas kick) – Rams 7–0
- NYG – Rodney Hampton 27 yard rush (David Treadwell kick) – Tied 7–7
- LA – Troy Drayton 12 yard pass from Chris Miller (Tony Zendejas kick) – Rams 14–7

Second quarter

- NYG – David Treadwell 24 yard field goal – Rams 14–10
- LA – Tony Zendejas 22 yard field goal – Rams 17–10

Giants

- Dave Brown—15/27, 165 Yds, 0 TD, 2 INT
- Rodney Hampton—27 Rush, 112 Yds
- Mike Sherrard—4 Rec, 66 Yds

Rams

- Chris Miller—13/26, 197 Yds, 2 TD, 1 INT
- Jerome Bettis—30 Rush, 88 Yds
- Jerome Bettis—3 Rec, 62 Yds

=== Week 8 ===
Week Eight: Los Angeles Rams (3–4) at New Orleans Saints (2–5)

Quarter	1	2	3	4	Total
Rams	0	17	3	14	34
Saints	14	13	10	0	37

at Louisiana Superdome, New Orleans

- Date: Sunday, October 23
- Game time: 10:00 a.m. PDT
- Game weather: Played indoors (dome stadium)
- Game attendance: 47,908 (69.37% full)
- Referee: Johnny Grier
- TV: FOX
- Pro-Football-Reference.com
  Saints' Longest Marches Made by Kick Returner (LA Times)

Game information

First quarter

- NO – Derek Brown 3 yard rush (Morten Andersen kick) – Saints 7–0
- NO – Wesley Walls 30 yard pass from Jim Everett (Morten Andersen kick) – Saints 14–0

Second quarter

- LA – Isaac Bruce 19 yard pass from Chris Miller (Tony Zendejas kick) – Saints 14–7
- NO – Morten Andersen 21 yard field goal – Saints 17–7
- LA – Toby Wright 98 yard fumble return (Tony Zendejas kick) – Saints 17–14
- NO – Tyrone Hughes 92 yard kickoff return (Morten Andersen kick) – Saints 24–14
- LA – Tony Zendejas 47 yard field goal – Saints 24–17
- NO – Morten Andersen 40 yard field goal – Saints 27–17

Third quarter

- NO – Morten Andersen 37 yard field goal – Saints 30–17
- LA – Tony Zendejas 32 yard field goal – Saints 30–20
- NO – Tyrone Hughes 98 yard kickoff return (Morten Andersen kick) – Saints 37–20

Fourth quarter

- LA – Johnny Bailey 7 yard rush (Tony Zendejas kick) – Saints 37–27
- LA – Robert Bailey 103 yard punt return (Tony Zendejas kick)– Saints 37–34

Rams

- Chris Miller—7/11, 88 Yds, 1 TD, 0 INT
- Jerome Bettis—18 Rush, 63 Yds
- Isaac Bruce—3 Rec, 44 Yds

Saints

- Jim Everett—17/26, 206 Yds, 1 TD, 2 INT
- Derek Brown—26 Rush, 86 Yds
- Wesley Walls—3 Rec, 65 Yds

This game was notable for Robert Bailey's record-setting punt return touchdown, wherein the Rams failed to down the ball in the end zone for a touchback; while most players assumed that the ball bounced out of bounds and stepped off the field, Bailey recognized the live ball, retrieved it, and ran it for 103 yards, all the way back to the Saints' end zone, untouched. Due to later rule changes that declare a punted ball dead when it hits the ground in the end zone, this play is currently unable to be replicated in the NFL.

=== Week 10 ===
Week Ten: Denver Broncos (3–5) at Los Angeles Rams (3–5)

Quarter	1	2	3	4	Total
Broncos	0	3	3	15	21
Rams	7	10	7	3	27

at Anaheim Stadium, Anaheim, California

- Date: Sunday, November 6
- Game time: 1:00 p.m. PST
- Game weather: 58 °F (14.4 °C), wind 8 miles per hour (13 km/h; 7.0 kn)
- Game attendance: 48,103 (69.71% full)
- TV: NBC
- Pro-Football-Reference.com
  Rams Don't Let Elway Drill Them (LA Times)

Game information

First quarter

- LA – Jerome Bettis 1 yard rush (Tony Zendejas kick) – Rams 7–0

Second quarter

- LA – Howard Griffith 3 yard pass from Chris Chandler (Tony Zendejas kick) – Rams 14–0
- DEN – Jason Elam 42 yard field goal – Rams 14–3
- LA – Tony Zendejas 35 yard field goal – Rams 17–3

Third quarter

- LA – Flipper Anderson 30 yard pass from Chris Chandler (Tony Zendejas kick) – Rams 24–3
- DEN – Jason Elam 29 yard field goal – Rams 24–6

Fourth quarter

- DEN – Glyn Milburn 20 yd pass from J. Elway (S. Sharpe pass from J. Elway) – Rams 24–14
- LA – Tony Zendejas 18 yard field goal – Rams 27–14
- DEN – Derek Russell 12 yard pass from John Elway (Jason Elam kick) – Rams 27–21

Broncos

- John Elway—24/45, 241 Yds, 2 TD, 0 INT
- John Elway—3 Rush, 18 Yds
- Shannon Sharpe— 7 Rec, 69 Yds

Rams

- Chris Chandler—19/25, 223 Yds, 2 TD, 1 INT
- Jerome Bettis—33 Rush, 91 Yds
- Flipper Anderson—5 Rec, 85 Yds

=== Week 11 ===
The final meeting between the two Southern California rivals ended in a close 20–17 victory for the Raiders in Anaheim. The Los Angeles Rams and the Los Angeles Raiders only met five times as cross-town rivals with the Rams finishing with a 1–4 record against the Raiders. The games, however, were generally very close with only one of the meetings being decided by more than one score (the Raiders' 16–6 victory in 1985). The 1994 meeting was a back and forth affair that eventually saw the Raiders ice the game away with a pair of field goals in the fourth quarter.

Week Eleven: Los Angeles Raiders (4–5) at Los Angeles Rams (4–5)

Quarter	1	2	3	4	Total
Raiders	7	7	0	6	20
Rams	7	0	0	10	17

at Anaheim Stadium, Anaheim, California

- Date: Sunday, November 13
- Game time: 1:00 p.m. PST
- Game weather: 56 °F (13.3 °C), wind 6 miles per hour (9.7 km/h; 5.2 kn)
- Game attendance: 65,208 (94.49% full)
- TV: NBC
- Pro-Football-Reference.com
  Raiders Rule Black-and-Blue Day (LA Times)

Game information

First quarter

- RAI – Andrew Glover 27 yard pass from Jeff Hostetler (Jeff Jaeger kick) – Raiders 7–0
- LA – Flipper Anderson 22 yard pass from Chris Chandler (Tony Zendejas kick) – Tied 7–7

Second quarter

- RAI – Raghib Ismail 10 yard pass from Jeff Hostetler (Jeff Jaeger kick) – Raiders 14–7

Fourth quarter

- RAI – Jeff Jaeger 44 yard field goal – Raiders 17–7
- LA – Tony Zendejas 22 yard field goal – Raiders 17–10
- RAI – Jeff Jaeger 47 yard field goal – Raiders 20–10
- LA – Todd Kinchen 4 yard pass from Chris Miller (Tony Zendejas kick) – Raiders 20–17

Raiders

- Jeff Hostetler—17/25, 218 Yds, 2 TD, 1 INT
- Harvey Williams—21 Rush, 44 Yds
- Tim Brown— 1 Rec, 53 Yds

Rams

- Chris Chandler—10/11, 171 Yds, 1 TD, 0 INT
- Jerome Bettis—10 Rush, 13 Yds
- Flipper Anderson—5 Rec, 105 Yds

=== Week 12 ===
This was the last meeting between the Rams and 49ers as California rivals until 2016 and it ended with the eventual Super Bowl champion 49ers on top with a 31–27 final. While the meeting between the two rivals in Anaheim was not very close, the 1994 meeting at Candlestick Park was a very close affair to close out the Los Angeles-San Francisco rivalry. The 49ers jumped out to an early 14–3 lead and held a 21–6 lead at halftime, the Rams, however, came storming back in the second half, outscoring San Francisco 21–10. Los Angeles was able to take the lead in the fourth quarter on a 22-yard pass play by Chris Miller, but the 49ers responded with a touchdown drive of their own to take a 31–27 advantage. The 49ers ended up holding on for their ninth win of the season while the Rams dropped their seventh game en route to a 4–12 season. The final record between the Los Angeles Rams and the San Francisco 49ers from the 1950 to 1994 was 48–40 in favor of Los Angeles.

Week Twelve: Los Angeles Rams (4–6) at San Francisco 49ers (8–2)

Quarter	1	2	3	4	Total
Rams	3	3	13	8	27
49ers	14	7	3	7	31

at Candlestick Park, San Francisco, California

- Date: Sunday, November 20
- Game time: 5:00 p.m. PST
- Game weather: 46 °F (7.8 °C), wind 5 miles per hour (8.0 km/h; 4.3 kn)
- Game attendance: 62,774 (94.38% full)
- TV announcers (ESPN): Mike Patrick and Joe Theismann
- Pro-Football-Reference.com
  In the End, Rams Dealt One Bad Hand (LA Times)

Game information

First quarter

- SF – John Taylor 7 yard pass from Steve Young (Doug Brien kick) – 49ers 7–0
- LA – Tony Zendejas 31 yard field goal – 49ers 7–3
- SF – Jerry Rice 7 yard pass from Steve Young (Doug Brien kick) – 49ers 14–3

Second quarter

- LA – Tony Zendejas 27 yard field goal – 49ers 14–6
- SF – Jerry Rice 5 yard pass from Steve Young (Doug Brien kick) – 49ers 21–6

Third quarter

- LA – Todd Kinchen 44 yard rush (pass failed) – 49ers 21–12
- SF – Doug Brien 28 yard field goal – 49ers 24–12
- LA – Flipper Anderson 50 yard pass from Chris Miller (Tony Zendejas kick) – 49ers 24–19

Fourth quarter

- LA – Jessie Hester 22 yard pass from Chris Miller (Jerome Bettis run) – Rams 27–24
- SF – Jerry Rice 18 yard pass from Steve Young (Doug Brien kick) – 49ers 31–27

Rams

- Chris Miller—16/33, 228 Yds, 2 TD, 0 INT
- Todd Kinchen—1 Rush, 44 Yds
- Flipper Anderson—5 Rec, 99 Yds

49ers

- Steve Young—30/44, 325 Yds, 4 TD, 0 INT
- Ricky Watters—20 Rush, 81 Yds
- Jerry Rice—16 Rec, 165 Yds

=== Week 13 ===
Week thirteen saw the final meeting between the Los Angeles Rams and the San Diego Chargers. The Rams jumped out to a 14–6 lead in the first half, but Los Angeles was unable to hold off the eventual AFC Champion Chargers and fell 31–17. After the season, the Chargers ended up having the entire Southern California megaregion to themselves after the Rams and the Raiders vacated the Los Angeles market—an arrangement that would not be changed until 2016, when the Rams relocated to Los Angeles. Los Angeles was also mathematically eliminated from the NFC West race during week 13 after its loss to San Diego and with San Francisco improving to 8–2 on the next day on Monday Night Football.

Week Thirteen: Los Angeles Rams (4–7) at San Diego Chargers (8–3)

Quarter	1	2	3	4	Total
Rams	0	14	0	3	17
Chargers	0	6	15	10	31

at Jack Murphy Stadium, San Diego

- Date: Sunday, November 27
- Game time: 1:00 p.m. PST
- Game weather: 52 °F (11.1 °C), wind 8 miles per hour (13 km/h; 7.0 kn)
- Game attendance: 59,579 (97.93% full)
- TV: Fox
- Pro-Football-Reference.com
  Rams at Height of Imperfection (LA Times)

Game information

Second quarter

- LA – Jessie Hester 40 yard pass from Chris Miller (Tony Zendejas kick) – Rams 7–0
- SD – John Carney 31 yard field goal – Rams 7–3
- LA – Troy Drayton 12 yard pass from Chris Miller (Tony Zendejas kick) – Rams 14–3
- SD – John Carney 49 yard field goal – Rams 14–6

Third quarter

- SD – Darrien Gordon 75 yard punt return (Ronnie Harmon run) – Tied 14–14
- SD – Ronnie Harmon 11 yd pass from Stan Humphries (John Carney kick) – Chargers 21–14

Fourth quarter

- SD – John Carney 37 yard field goal – Chargers 24–14
- LA – Tony Zendejas 33 yard field goal – Chargers 24–17
- SD – Sean Vanhorse 50 yard interception return (John Carney kick) – Chargers 31–17

Rams

- Chris Miller—26/47, 298 Yds, 2 TD, 4 INT
- Jerome Bettis—10 Rush, 38 Yds
- Jessie Hester—4 Rec, 85 Yds

Chargers

- Stan Humphries—17/33, 147 Yds, 1 TD, 1 INT
- Natrone Means—23 Rush, 95 Yds
- Mark Seay—4 Rec, 42 Yds

=== Week 14 ===
Week Fourteen: New Orleans Saints (4–8) at Los Angeles Rams (4–8)

Quarter	1	2	3	4	Total
Saints	7	21	3	0	31
Rams	0	7	0	8	15

at Anaheim Stadium, Anaheim, California

- Date: Sunday, December 4
- Game time: 1:00 p.m. PST
- Game weather: 56 °F (13.3 °C), wind 6 miles per hour (9.7 km/h; 5.2 kn)
- Game attendance: 34,960 (50.66% full)
- Referee: Howard Roe
- TV: FOX
- Pro-Football-Reference.com
  Ram Loss to Saints, Everett No Easier the Second Time (LA Times)

Game information

First quarter

- NO – Mario Bates 26 yard rush (Morten Andersen kick) – Saints 7–0

Second quarter

- NO – Mario Bates 11 yard rush (Morten Andersen kick) – Saints 14–0
- LA – Todd Kinchen 24 yard pass from Chris Miller (Tony Zendejas kick) – Saints 14–7
- NO – Mario Bates 1 yard rush (Morten Andersen kick) – Saints 21–7
- NO – Michael Haynes 30 yard pass from Jim Everett (Morten Andersen kick) – Saints 28–7

Third quarter

- NO – Morten Andersen 46 yard field goal – Saints 31–7

Fourth quarter

- LA – Jerome Bettis 5 yard pass from Chris Miller (Jerome Bettis run) – Saints 31–15

Saints

- Jim Everett—13/22, 161 Yds, 1 TD, 1 INT
- Mario Bates—25 Rush, 96 Yds
- Michael Haynes—5 Rec, 80 Yds

Rams

- Chris Miller—17/24, 198 Yds, 2 TD, 0 INT
- Jerome Bettis—15 Rush, 53 Yds
- Johnny Bailey—11 Rec, 116 Yds

=== Week 15 ===
In front of a sparse crowd of around 34,000 at Tampa Stadium, Los Angeles dropped its fifth game in a row and in the process became mathematically eliminated from playoff contention for the fifth consecutive season. The game was fairly evenly matched (both were 4–9 going into the game) except for a 17-point outburst in the second quarter by the Buccaneers that gave Tampa Bay the victory.

Week Fifteen: Los Angeles Rams (4–9) at Tampa Bay Buccaneers (4–9)

Quarter	1	2	3	4	Total
Rams	0	7	0	7	14
Buccaneers	0	17	0	7	24

at Tampa Stadium, Tampa, Florida

- Date: Sunday, December 11
- Game time: 10:00 a.m. PST
- Game weather: 68 °F (20 °C), wind 13 miles per hour (21 km/h; 11 kn)
- Game attendance: 34,150 (45.96% full)
- TV: Fox
- Pro-Football-Reference.com
  Rams Lose Cool, Tampa Bay Takes Advantage, 24-14 (LA Times)

Game information

Second quarter

- TB – Michael Husted 20 yard field goal – Buccaneers 3–0
- TB – Charles Wilson 71 yd pass from Craig Erickson (M. Husted kick) – Buccaneers 10–0
- LA – Troy Drayton 22 yd pass from Chris Chandler (Tony Zendejas kick) – Buccaneers 10–7
- TB – Errict Rhett 8 yard rush (Michael Husted kick) – Buccaneers 17–7

Fourth quarter

- LA – Jessie Hester 12 yd pass from Chris Chandler (T. Zendejas kick) – Buccaneers 17–14
- TB – Charles Wilson 44 yd pass from Craig Erickson (M. Husted kick) – Buccaneers 24–14

Rams

- Chris Chandler—18/34, 199 Yds, 2 TD, 0 INT
- Jerome Bettis—13 Rush, 23 Yds
- Jessie Hester—6 Rec, 82 Yds

Buccaneers

- Craig Erickson—10/22, 231 Yds, 2 TD, 0 INT
- Errict Rhett—31 Rush, 119 Yds
- Charles Wilson—4 Rec, 176 Yds

=== Week 16 ===
Week Sixteen: Los Angeles Rams (4–10) at Chicago Bears (8–6)

Quarter	1	2	3	4	Total
Rams	7	3	0	3	13
Bears	3	14	3	7	27

at Soldier Field, Chicago

- Date: Sunday, December 18
- Game time: 10:00 a.m. PST
- Game weather: 33 °F (0.6 °C), wind 14 miles per hour (23 km/h; 12 kn)
- Game attendance: 56,276 (84.06% full)
- TV: Fox
- Pro-Football-Reference.com
  Bettis Can't Run and Rams Can't Hide in Chicago (LA Times)

Game information

First quarter

- LA – Chris Chandler 1 yard rush (Tony Zendejas kick) – Rams 7–0
- CHI – Kevin Butler 41 yard field goal – Rams 7–3

Second quarter

- LA – Tony Zendejas 18 yard field goal – Rams 10–3
- CHI – Keith Jennings 3 yard pass from Steve Walsh (Kevin Butler kick) – Tied 10–10
- CHI – Raymont Harris 2 yard rush (Kevin Butler kick) – Bears 17–10

Third quarter

- CHI – Kevin Butler 30 yard field goal – Bears 20–10

Fourth quarter

- LA – Tony Zendejas 21 yard field goal – Bears 20–13
- CHI – Lewis Tillman 1 yard rush (Kevin Butler kick) – Bears 27–13

Rams

- Chris Chandler— 8/13, 145 Yds, 0 TD, 0 INT
- Johnny Bailey— 3 Rush, 9 Yds
- Flipper Anderson— 2 Rec, 69 Yds

Bears

- Steve Walsh— 12/25, 135 Yds, 1 TD, 0 INT
- Raymont Harris— 23 Rush, 92 Yds
- Jeff Graham— 4 Rec, 66 Yds

=== Week 17 ===
In front of the smallest crowd at Anaheim Stadium, the Rams closed out their tenure in Southern California with a loss to the 2–13 Washington Redskins. After a season full of rumors of the franchise's inevitable relocation, the fan base had withered down to next to nothing and two high school football games at Anaheim Stadium drew larger crowds than the announced attendance for the Rams' week 17 game. Many fans spent the game chanting expletives and hurling insults and owner Georgia Frontiere and the City of St. Louis—"Save the Rams" founder Leigh Steinberg attempted to discuss keeping the Rams in Southern California, but Rams executives were nowhere to be found. The game was a close affair with the hapless Washington Redskins and despite being favored by 3.5 points, Los Angeles ended up falling by three points to end 49 seasons of Los Angeles Ram football. They would subsequently return to Los Angeles in 2016 after experiencing similar issues in St. Louis as they previously did in Los Angeles.

Week Seventeen: Washington Redskins (2–13) at Los Angeles Rams (4–11)

Quarter	1	2	3	4	Total
Redskins	0	17	7	0	24
Rams	7	14	0	0	21

at Anaheim Stadium, Anaheim, California

- Date: Saturday, December 24
- Game time: 1:00 p.m. PDT
- Game weather: 62 °F (16.7 °C), wind 7 miles per hour (11 km/h; 6.1 kn)
- Game attendance: 25,705 (37.25% full)
- TV: Fox
- Pro-Football-Reference.com
  Rams Are All but Run Out of Town by Redskins, 24-21 (LA Times)

Game information

First quarter

- LA – Anthony Newman 22 yard interception return (Tony Zendejas kick) – Rams 7–0

Second quarter

- WAS – Reggie Brooks 2 yard rush (Chip Lohmiller kick) – Tied 7–7
- LA – Todd Kinchen 34 yard pass from Chris Miller (Tony Zendejas kick) – Rams 14–7
- WAS – Brian Mitchell 78 yard punt return (Chip Lohmiller kick) – Tied 14–14
- WAS – Chip Lohmiller 37 yard field goal – Redskins 17–14
- LA – Jermaine Ross 36 yard pass from Chris Miller (Tony Zendejas kick) – Rams 21–17

Third quarter

- WAS – James Jenkins 1 yd pass from Heath Shuler (Chip Lohmiller kick) – Redskins 24–21

Redskins

- Heath Shuler— 13/28, 149 Yds, 1 TD, 1 INT
- Reggie Brooks— 13 Rush, 50 Yds
- Henry Ellard— 5 Rec, 81 Yds

Rams

- Chris Miller— 27/40, 304 Yds, 2 TD, 1 INT
- Jerome Bettis— 15 Rush, 48 Yds
- Jessie Hester— 5 Rec, 66 Yds

=== Standings ===
NFC West
	W	L	T	PCT	PF	PA	STK
^{(1)} San Francisco 49ers	13	3	0	.813	505	296	L1
New Orleans Saints	7	9	0	.438	348	407	W1
Atlanta Falcons	7	9	0	.438	317	385	W1
Los Angeles Rams	4	12	0	.250	286	365	L7

== Relocation to St. Louis ==
By 1994, the Los Angeles Rams had withered to a mere shadow of their former self. Accusations and excuses were constantly thrown back and forth between the Rams' fan base, ownership, and local politicians. Many in the fan base blamed the ownership of Georgia Frontiere for the franchise's woes, while ownership cited the outdated stadium and withering fan support for the problems that were plaguing the Rams. On March 15, 1994, the National Football League owners rejected Ms. Frontiere's bid to move the franchise to St. Louis, Missouri, her native city, by a 21–3–6 vote, with the Raiders abstaining. Then-Commissioner Paul Tagliabue stated after rejecting the move that:

"This was one of the most complex issues we have had to approach in years. We had to balance the interest of fans in Los Angeles and in St. Louis that we appreciate very much. In my judgment, they did not meet the guidelines we have in place for such a move."

The commissioner also added:

"Once the bridges have been burned and people get turned off on a sports franchise, years of loyalty is not respected and it is difficult to get it back. By the same token, there are millions of fans in that area who have supported the Rams in an extraordinary way. The Rams have 50 years of history and the last 5 or so years of difficult times can be corrected."

Frontiere, however, responded with a thinly veiled threat at a lawsuit and the NFL owners eventually acquiesced to her demands, weary of going through a long, protracted legal battle. Tagliabue simply stated that "The desire to have peace and not be at war was a big factor" in allowing the Rams move to go forward. In a matter of a month, the vote had gone from 21–6 opposed to 23–6 in favor, with the Raiders again abstaining. Jonathan Kraft, son of Patriots owner Robert Kraft, elaborated on the commissioners remarks by saying "About five or six owners didn't want to get the other owners into litigation, so they switched their votes." Only six teams remained in opposition to the Rams move from Los Angeles: the Pittsburgh Steelers, New York Giants, New York Jets, Buffalo Bills, Arizona Cardinals (who played in St. Louis from 1960 to 1987), and Washington Redskins. After the vote was over, Dan Rooney publicly stated that he opposed the move of the Los Angeles Rams because:

"I believe we should support the fans who have supported us for years".

The Rams would not return to the Los Angeles area until 2016.

== See also ==
- History of the Los Angeles Rams
- Anaheim Stadium
