= 1994 Detroit Lions season =

NFL team season

- Owner: William Clay Ford Sr.
- General manager: Chuck Schmidt
- Head coach: Wayne Fontes
- Offensive coordinator: Tom Moore
- Defensive coordinator: Herb Paterra
- Home stadium: Pontiac Silverdome

Results
- Record: 9–7
- Division place: 3rd NFC Central
- Playoffs: Lost Wild Card Playoffs (at Packers) 12–16

The 1994 Detroit Lions season was the 65th season in the National Football League (NFL). The Lions finished with a 9–7 record and made their second consecutive playoff appearance as one of the NFC's Wildcard teams—the first time the franchise had made the playoffs in consecutive non-strike seasons since 1954.

The Lions underwent a complete overhaul at quarterback, as all three quarterbacks from 1993 left in free agency: Rodney Peete joined Dallas as a backup to Troy Aikman; Erik Kramer signed with division rival Chicago as their starter; and former Heisman Trophy winner Andre Ware signed with Minnesota but was cut before the season started, subsequently being picked up and later released by the Los Angeles Raiders without playing a single down. The Lions compensated by signing Miami backup Scott Mitchell to be their starter and Kansas City backup Dave Krieg to back him up, as well as bringing back Chuck Long as their third-string QB.

Despite the signing of Mitchell, it was Kreig, a former starter in Seattle, who led the Lions into the playoffs following an injury to Mitchell. For the second consecutive year, the Lions lost in the playoffs to the Green Bay Packers. After the season, Milton Mack retired.

== Offseason ==
Free Agency: The Lions signed Scott Mitchell, who had just replaced an injured Dan Marino.

Additions	Subtractions
QB Scott Mitchell (Dolphins)	QB Erik Kramer (Bears)
QB Dave Krieg (Chiefs)	QB Rodney Peete (Cowboys)
WR Anthony Carter (Vikings)	WR Willie Green (Buccaneers)
LB Scott Kowalkowski (Eagles)	P Jim Arnold (Chiefs)
LB Broderick Thomas (Buccaneers)	LB George Jamison (Chiefs)
LB Mike Johnson (Browns)	G David Richards (Falcons)
P Greg Montgomery (Oilers)	WR Jeff Campbell (Broncos)
CB Milton Mack (Buccaneers)	WR Reggie Barrett (Seahawks)
	CB Tim McKyer (Steelers)
	QB Andre Ware (Vikings)
	G Bill Fralic (retirement)

=== NFL draft ===
1994 Detroit Lions draft
Round	Pick	Player	Position	College	Notes
1	21	Johnnie Morton	Wide receiver	USC	
2	57	Van Malone	Safety	Texas	
3	93	Shane Bonham	Defensive tackle	Tennessee	
4	124	Vaughn Bryant	Cornerback	Stanford	
5	154	Tony Semple	Guard	Memphis	
6	183	Jocelyn Borgella	Cornerback	Cincinnati	
7	215	Tom Beer	Linebacker	Saginaw Valley State	
Made roster

=== Undrafted free agents ===
1994 undrafted free agents of note
Player	Position	College
Ernie Brown	Defensive End	Syracuse
Josh Butland	Punter	Michigan State
Eric Green	Wide receiver	Benedictine (IL)
Jason Jones	Guard	Hampton
John Oglesby	Running back	TCU
Ricky Powers	Running back	Michigan
James Wilson	Defensive tackle	Tennessee
Richard Woodley	Wide receiver	TCU

== Personnel ==
=== Staff ===
1994 Detroit Lions staff
Front office: Owner and president – William Clay Ford Sr.; Executive vice president and chief operating officer – Chuck Schmidt; Treasurer – William Clay Ford Jr.; Director of player personnel – Ron Hughes; Director of pro scouting – Kevin Colbert; Head coaches: Head coach – Wayne Fontes; Assistant head coach/offense – Dave Levy; Offensive coaches: Quarterbacks – Tom Moore; Running backs – Billie Matthews; Receivers – Charlie Sanders; Tight ends/h-backs – Dave Jaumotte; Offensive line – Paul Boudreau	Defensive coaches: Defensive coordinator – Herb Paterra; Defensive line – Lamar Leachman; Linebackers – Howard Tippett; Outside linebackers – Don Clemons; Defensive backs – John Fontes; Special teams coaches: Special teams – Steve Kazor; Strength and conditioning: Strength and conditioning/defensive assistant – Bert Hill

=== Roster ===
1994 Detroit Lions roster
Quarterbacks (QB): 17 Dave Krieg; 16 Chuck Long; 13 Gino Torretta; Running backs (RB): 48 Tom Beer FB; 23 Mel Gray; 26 Eric Lynch; 31 Derrick Moore; 34 Ron Rivers; 20 Barry Sanders; Wide receivers (WR): 81 Anthony Carter; 83 Aubrey Matthews; 84 Herman Moore; 87 Johnnie Morton; 80 Brett Perriman; 42 Larry Ryans; Tight ends (TE): 49 Ty Hallock; 82 Rodney Holman	Offensive linemen (OL): 75 Lomas Brown T; 66 Shawn Bouwens G; 68 Leonard Burton C; 74 Mike Compton G; 76 Scott Conover G/T; 53 Kevin Glover C; 73 Dave Lutz T; 71 Larry Tharpe T; 67 Doug Widell G; Defensive linemen (DL): 96 Shane Bonham DE; 90 Dan Owens NT; 91 Robert Porcher DE; 94 Kelvin Pritchett DE; 93 Marc Spindler NT; 95 Mike Wells	Linebackers (LB): 99 Tracy Hayworth OLB; 59 Mike Johnson ILB; 57 Victor Jones ILB; 52 Scott Kowalkowski ILB; 55 Antonio London OLB; 97 Tracy Scroggins OLB; 54 Chris Spielman ILB; 56 Pat Swilling OLB; 51 Broderick Thomas OLB; Defensive backs (DB): 36 Bennie Blades FS; 27 Jocelyn Borgella CB; 32 Willie Clay SS; 21 Harry Colon SS; 25 Greg Jeffries CB; 24 Milton Mack CB; 39 Van Malone FS; 40 Robert Massey CB; 47 Ryan McNeil CB; Special teams (ST): 4 Jason Hanson K; 9 Greg Montgomery P; 63 Mark Rodenhauser LS	Practice squad: 30 John Oglesby RB; 64 James Wilson DE; 44 Richard Woodley WR; Reserve: 89 Ron Hall TE (IR); 19 Scott Mitchell QB (IR); 38 Kevin Scott CB (IR); 62 Tony Semple G (IR); Rookies in italics 53 active, 4 reserve, 3 practice squad

== Regular season ==
=== Schedule ===
Week	Date	Opponent	Result	Record	Venue	Attendance	Recap
1	September 4	Atlanta Falcons	**W** 31–28 (OT)	1–0	Pontiac Silverdome	60,740	Recap
2	September 11	at **Minnesota Vikings**	**L** 3–10	1–1	Hubert H. Humphrey Metrodome	57,349	Recap
3	September 19	at Dallas Cowboys	**W** 20–17 (OT)	2–1	Texas Stadium	64,102	Recap
4	September 25	New England Patriots	**L** 17–23	2–2	Pontiac Silverdome	59,618	Recap
5	October 2	at **Tampa Bay Buccaneers**	**L** 14–24	2–3	Tampa Stadium	38,012	Recap
6	October 9	San Francisco 49ers	**L** 21–27	2–4	Pontiac Silverdome	77,340	Recap
7	Bye						
8	October 23	**Chicago Bears**	**W** 21–16	3–4	Pontiac Silverdome	73,574	Recap
9	October 30	at New York Giants	**W** 28–25 (OT)	4–4	Giants Stadium	75,124	Recap
10	November 6	at **Green Bay Packers**	**L** 30–38	4–5	Milwaukee County Stadium	54,995	Recap
11	November 13	**Tampa Bay Buccaneers**	**W** 14–9	5–5	Pontiac Silverdome	50,814	Recap
12	November 20	at **Chicago Bears**	**L** 10–20	5–6	Soldier Field	55,035	Recap
13	November 24	Buffalo Bills	**W** 35–21	6–6	Pontiac Silverdome	75,672	Recap
14	December 4	**Green Bay Packers**	**W** 34–31	7–6	Pontiac Silverdome	76,338	Recap
15	December 10	at New York Jets	**W** 18–7	8–6	Giants Stadium	56,080	Recap
16	December 17	**Minnesota Vikings**	**W** 41–19	9–6	Pontiac Silverdome	73,881	Recap
17	December 25	at Miami Dolphins	**L** 20–27	9–7	Joe Robbie Stadium	70,980	Recap

Note: Intra-division opponents are in bold text.

=== Game summaries ===
==== Week 1 vs. Atlanta Falcons ====
The Lions opened the 1994 season by hosting the Falcons, who were no longer with the services of defensive back Deion Sanders, now with San Francisco. Scott Mitchell and Jeff George erupted in the second half, combining for six touchdowns as the game lead tied or changed six times. In overtime the Lions drove down for Jason Hanson's winning field goal and a 31–28 final.

==== Week 2 at Minnesota Vikings ====
Defense was the story as the two teams combined for just 501 yards of offense, four fumbles, two interceptions, 147 yards of penalties, and a 10–3 Vikings win.

==== Week 3 at Dallas Cowboys ====
Team	1	2	3	4	OT	Total
• Lions	3	7	7	0	3	20
Cowboys	7	0	3	7	0	17

- Date: September 19
- Location: Texas Stadium, Irving, Texas
- Game start: 8:00 p.m.
- Game attendance: 64,102
- Game weather: 73 °F (23 °C); wind 9 mph (14 km/h)
- TV announcers (ABC): Frank Gifford, Al Michaels, Dan Dierdorf

Scoring summary
Q1	DAL	Alvin Harper 17 yard pass from Troy Aikman (Chris Boniol kick)	DAL 7–0
Q1	DET	Jason Hanson 32 yard field goal	DAL 7–3
Q2	DET	Brett Perriman 25 yard pass from Scott Mitchell (Jason Hanson kick)	DET 10–7
Q3	DET	Herman Moore 9 yard pass from Scott Mitchell (Jason Hanson kick)	DET 17–7
Q3	DAL	Chris Boniol 19 yard field goal	DET 17–10
Q4	DAL	Emmitt Smith 6 yard run (Chris Boniol kick)	Tie 17–17
OT	DET	Jason Hanson 44 yard field goal	DET 20–17

Barry Sanders accounted for 194 of the Lions' 379 total yards of offense, while the Cowboys fumbled away the ball three times.

==== Week 4 vs. New England Patriots ====
Two Scott Mitchell interceptions proved decisive as the Patriots held on to win 23–17, despite 131 yards and two scores by Barry Sanders, highlighted when he outmaneuvered Harlon Barnett and Myron Guyton on one score; the NFL Films slow-motion clip of the score is the most replayed highlight in retrospectives on Sanders' career.

==== Week 5 at Tampa Bay Buccaneers ====
Scott Mitchell and Derrick Moore rushing touchdowns were the only offense the Lions could generate as the Bucs held on to a 24–14 win.

==== Week 6 vs. San Francisco 49ers ====
The Lions suffered their third straight loss despite racing to a 14–0 lead; they sacked Steve Young and Young, suffering a pinched nerve, writhed in pain, his face turning red. He managed to limp to the sidelines; Elvis Grbac came in for one play (an incomplete pass) before Young recovered enough to come back in and lead the Niners to four touchdown drives (marred by a missed PAT) for the 27–21 Niners win.

==== Week 8 vs. Chicago Bears ====
Despite giving up 400 yards of offense (and giving up two fumbles and a pick) and managing just 232 of their own (167 of them from Barry Sanders), the Lions intercepted Erik Kramer three times and Mel Gray's 102-yard kickoff return was decisive in a 21–16 Lions win.

==== Week 9 at New York Giants ====
After the Lions forced a safety in the first quarter, the game lead tied or changed five times as Barry Sanders rushed for 146 yards and caught two passes for 22 yards. Scott Mitchell was intercepted three times but managed two touchdowns, the last to Herman Moore in the fourth quarter. Dave Meggett's 56-yard punt return and Aaron Pierce's seven-yard catch in the fourth forced overtime, won 28–25 by the Lions on a 24-yard kick by Jason Hanson.

==== Week 10 at Green Bay Packers ====
The Lions fumbled three times and Scott Mitchell was benched after throwing two picks; Dave Krieg threw three touchdowns but the Lions could not overcome a 24–0 gap, falling 38–30.

==== Week 11 vs. Tampa Bay Buccaneers ====
Barry Sanders exploded to 237 rushing yards as the Lions held the Bucs to three field goals, winning 14–9.

==== Week 12 at Chicago Bears ====
The Lions scored 10 points in the second quarter but that was all they could muster as the Bears outgained them in yards 338–180 and scored ten second-half points to win 20–10.

==== Week 13 Thanksgiving vs. Buffalo Bills ====
Dave Krieg started and the Lions passing attack erupted to 351 yards and three touchdowns. The Bills fell behind 21–7 but clawed to within 28–21 in the fourth quarter, but Jim Kelly was intercepted by Willie Clay and Clay ran back the 28-yard touchdown that clinched the win for the Lions 35–21. Barry Sanders managed only 45 rushing yards and one touchdown. A glorious Thanksgiving Day for the Lions.

==== Week 14 vs. Green Bay Packers ====
The Lions and Packers squared off in a highly competitive contest as the game lead tied once and changed six times following the first quarter and a 14–3 Packers lead. Barry Sanders broke out 188 rushing yards and a touchdown while Dave Krieg managed 196 passing yards and two touchdowns. Brett Favre had three touchdowns but was picked off twice as the Lions rallied to win 34–31.

==== Week 15 at New York Jets ====
The post-November collapse of the 1994 Jets continued as Jason Hanson booted four field goals yet missed the PAT on a Barry Sanders touchdown catch. The Jets managed just 261 yards of offense and a Brad Baxter touchdown as the Lions won 18–7.

==== Week 16 vs. Minnesota Vikings ====
The four-way showdown for the NFC Central title took another twist as the Lions crushed the Vikings 41–19. The Lions needed only 284 yards of offense as Barry Sanders accounted for two touchdowns and Dave Krieg added a pair of scoring tosses. Warren Moon managed one touchdown and one pick and was replaced by Brad Johnson, but it couldn't help the Vikings overcome ten penalties for 98 yards.

==== Week 17 Christmas at Miami Dolphins ====
On Sunday Night Football both teams were locked in neck-and-neck divisional races; with the Patriots beating the Bears and the Packers downing the Buccaneers the day before, and the Vikings to face the 49ers on Monday Night, both teams had motive to win. It would not happen for the Lions as Dave Krieg was intercepted twice and Barry Sanders was held to 52 yards. Bernie Parmalee had 39 rushing yards and three touchdowns as the Dolphins won 27–20, winning the AFC East while the Lions made the playoffs as the NFC's fifth seed.

=== Standings ===
NFC Central
	W	L	T	PCT	PF	PA	STK
^{(3)} Minnesota Vikings	10	6	0	.625	356	314	W1
^{(4)} Green Bay Packers	9	7	0	.563	382	287	W3
^{(5)} Detroit Lions	9	7	0	.563	357	342	L1
^{(6)} Chicago Bears	9	7	0	.563	271	307	L1
Tampa Bay Buccaneers	6	10	0	.375	251	351	L1

== Playoffs ==
=== NFC Wild Card Game: At Green Bay Packers ===
NFC Wild Card Game: Detroit Lions at Green Bay Packers – Game summary

Quarter	1	2	3	4	Total
Lions	0	0	3	9	12
Packers	7	3	3	3	16

at Lambeau Field, Green Bay, Wisconsin

- Game time: 12:30 p.m. EST/11:30 a.m. CST
- Game weather: 31 °F (−1 °C), partly cloudy
- Game attendance: 58,125
- Referee: Gary Lane
- TV announcers (ABC): Brent Musburger, Dick Vermeil, and Lesley Visser

The Packers defense held Lions running back Barry Sanders to −1 rushing yards while holding Brett Perriman to −4 rushing yards. The Lions managed just 171 total yards of offense, with 199 yards passing from Dave Krieg, but he was sacked 4 times, resulting in 28 yards loss.

== Awards and honors ==
- Barry Sanders, All-Pro
- Barry Sanders, NFC Pro Bowl Selection
- Barry Sanders, NFL Offensive Player of the Year
- Barry Sanders, Club Record, Most Rushing Yards in One Game, 237 yards, November 13.

=== Milestones ===
- Barry Sanders, 6th consecutive 1000 yard season
