= Rob Fredrickson =

American football player (born 1971)

No. 53, 59
- Position: Linebacker

Personal information
- Born: May 13, 1971 (age 55); St. Joseph, Michigan, U.S.
- Listed height: 6 ft 4 in (1.93 m)
- Listed weight: 239 lb (108 kg)

Career information
- High school: St. Joseph
- College: Michigan State
- NFL draft: 1994: 1st round, 22nd overall pick

Career history
- Los Angeles / Oakland Raiders (1994–1997); Detroit Lions (1998); Arizona Cardinals (1999–2002)

Awards and highlights
- PFWA All-Rookie Team (1994); Second-team All-Big Ten (1993)

Career NFL statistics
- Tackles: 738
- Sacks: 15.5
- Interceptions: 5
- Stats at Pro Football Reference

Robert J. Fredrickson (born May 13, 1971) is an American former professional football player who was a linebacker for nine seasons in the National Football League (NFL) for the Los Angeles / Oakland Raiders, Detroit Lions, and Arizona Cardinals. He attended Michigan State University and was a 4-time Academic All-Big Ten recipient and earned All-American honors. He was selected in the first round of the 1994 NFL draft by the Raiders. Fredrickson was selected to the NFL All-Rookie 1st Team in 1994. He played linebacker for the Lions in 1998 and signed as a free agent with the Cardinals in 1999. He holds the modern-era Cardinals record for most tackles in a game with 22 vs. the New York Jets in 1999. He retired from the NFL in 2003.

Fredrickson continues to be active in the Phoenix community and is a member of the Phoenix charitable volunteer group, The Thunderbirds. As hosts of the Waste Management Phoenix Open, The Thunderbirds raised a record $13.2 million ($13,254,334) for local charities through proceeds from the 2019 tournament. The Thunderbirds and the Waste Management Phoenix Open have raised more than $81 million ($81,672,224) for local charities since 2010 when Waste Management became title sponsor. In its history, dating back to 1932, The Thunderbirds and the Phoenix Open have raised more than $147 million ($147,718,790) for charities in Arizona.

== NFL career statistics ==
Legend
| | Led the league |
| **Bold** | Career high |

| Year | Team | Games | | Tackles | | | | Interceptions | | | | Fumbles | | | |
| Year | Team | GP | GS | Comb | Solo | Ast | Sck | Int | Yds | TD | Lng | FF | FR | Yds | TD |
|---|---|---|---|---|---|---|---|---|---|---|---|---|---|---|---|
| 1994 | RAI | 16 | 12 | 81 | 58 | 23 | 3.0 | 0 | 0 | 0 | 0 | 1 | 0 | 0 | 0 |
| 1995 | OAK | 16 | 15 | 85 | 71 | 14 | 0.0 | 1 | 14 | 0 | 14 | 0 | **4** | **35** | **1** |
| 1996 | OAK | 10 | 10 | 47 | 36 | 11 | 0.0 | 0 | 0 | 0 | 0 | 0 | 0 | 0 | 0 |
| 1997 | OAK | 16 | 13 | 75 | 60 | 15 | 2.0 | 0 | 0 | 0 | 0 | 0 | 0 | 0 | 0 |
| 1998 | DET | 16 | 16 | 86 | 56 | 30 | 2.5 | 1 | 0 | 0 | 0 | 0 | 0 | 0 | 0 |
| 1999 | ARI | 16 | 16 | **125** | **95** | 30 | 2.0 | **2** | **57** | **1** | **34** | **3** | 1 | 0 | 0 |
| 2000 | ARI | 13 | 12 | 99 | 61 | **38** | 1.0 | 1 | 8 | 0 | 8 | 0 | 0 | 0 | 0 |
| 2001 | ARI | 15 | 15 | 93 | 72 | 21 | **4.0** | 0 | 0 | 0 | 0 | 1 | 0 | 0 | 0 |
| 2002 | ARI | 10 | 10 | 47 | 35 | 12 | 1.0 | 0 | 0 | 0 | 0 | 0 | 0 | 0 | 0 |
| | | 128 | 119 | 738 | 544 | 194 | 15.5 | 5 | 79 | 1 | 34 | 5 | 5 | 35 | 1 |
