= 1994 Atlanta Falcons season =

NFL team season

- Owner: Rankin Smith
- Head coach: June Jones
- Home stadium: Georgia Dome

Results
- Record: 7–9
- Division place: 3rd NFC West
- Playoffs: Did not qualify
- Pro Bowlers: WR Terance Mathis; DE Chris Doleman; LB Jessie Tuggle; S Elbert Shelley

The 1994 Atlanta Falcons season was the franchise's 29th season in the National Football League (NFL).

Under head coach June Jones, the Falcons' run and shoot offense was heavily imbalanced in 1994, in favor of the passing game. Atlanta's passing yardage (4,112 yards) was third in the NFC, and fifth in the league overall; but their rushing yards (1,249, 78.1 yards per game) were last in the league. They had by far the fewest rushing attempts in the league in 1994, with only 330 all year.

The Falcons started 4–2 in their first six games, but their season was ruined by going 3–7 afterwards.

== Offseason ==
Additions	Subtractions
DE Chris Doleman (Vikings)	RB Steve Broussard (Bengals)
S Brad Edwards (Redskins)	WR Michael Haynes (Saints)
QB Jeff George (Colts)	T Chris Hinton (Vikings)
RB Craig Heyward (Bears)	QB Chris Miller (Rams)
LB Clay Matthews Jr. (Browns)	WR Mike Pritchard (Broncos)
G Jim Ritcher (Bills)	
WR Ricky Sanders (Redskins)	
WR Clarence Verdin (Colts)	
G Mike Zandofsky (Chargers)	

=== NFL draft ===
1994 Atlanta Falcons draft
Round	Pick	Player	Position	College	Notes
2	45	Bert Emanuel	Wide receiver	Rice	
3	72	Anthony Phillips	Defensive back	Texas A&M–Kingsville	
3	99	Alai Kalaniuvalu	Guard	Oregon State	
4	111	Perry Klein	Quarterback	C. W. Post	
4	118	Mitch Davis	Linebacker	Georgia	
5	138	Harrison Houston	Wide receiver	Florida	
7	201	Jamal Anderson *	Running back	Utah	
Made roster * Made at least one Pro Bowl during career

=== Undrafted free agents ===
1994 undrafted free agents of note
Player	Position	College
Tyoka Jackson	Defensive end	Penn State
Clint Johnson	Wide receiver	Notre Dame
Stan White	Quarterback	Auburn

== Personnel ==
=== Staff ===
1994 Atlanta Falcons staff
Front office: Chairman of the Board – Rankin M. Smith Sr.; President – Taylor Smith; Vice President of Player Personnel – Ken Herock; Director of Pro Personnel – Chuck Connor; Head coaches: Head Coach – June Jones; Offensive coaches: Quarterbacks – Mouse Davis; Running Backs – Ollie Wilson; Assistant Head Coach/Wide Receivers – Milt Jackson; Offensive Line – Bob Palcic	Defensive coaches: Defensive Coordinator – Jim Bates; Defensive Line – Bill Kollar; Linebackers – Joe Haering; Outside Linebackers – Keith Armstrong; Secondary – Greg Brown; Defensive Assistant – Tim Marcum; Special teams coaches: Assistant Head Coach/Special Teams – Frank Gansz; Strength and conditioning: Strength and Conditioning – Tim Jorgensen

=== Roster ===
1994 Atlanta Falcons roster
Quarterbacks (QB): 1 Jeff George; 3 Bobby Hebert; 7 Perry Klein; Running backs (RB): 32 Jamal Anderson; 34 Craig Heyward; 33 Erric Pegram; Wide receivers (WR): 87 Bert Emanuel; 82 Leonard Harris; 81 Terance Mathis; 85 David Mims; 80 Andre Rison; 83 Ricky Sanders; 84 Darryl Spencer; 2 Clarence Verdin; Tight ends (TE): 88 Harper LeBel LS; 86 Mitch Lyons	Offensive linemen (OL): 75 Irv Eatman T; 65 Roman Fortin C; 78 Mike Kenn T; 66 Lincoln Kennedy T; 62 David Richards G; 51 Jim Ritcher G; 61 Robbie Tobeck C; 70 Bob Whitfield T; 72 Mike Zandofsky G; Defensive linemen (DL): 68 Mel Agee DT; 73 Dunstan Anderson DE; 92 Lester Archambeau DE; 56 Chris Doleman DE; 67 Moe Gardner DT; 97 Jumpy Geathers DT; 71 Bill Goldberg DT; 95 Pierce Holt DT; 69 Tom Williams DE	Linebackers (LB): 48 Darryl Ford OLB; 50 Ron George OLB; 53 Dwayne Gordon MLB; 57 Clay Matthews OLB; 52 Ken Tippins OLB; 58 Jessie Tuggle MLB; Defensive backs (DB): 25 Scott Case FS; 20 Brad Edwards FS; 39 Eric Jack CB; 44 D. J. Johnson CB; 41 Brett Maxie SS; 26 Anthony Phillips CB; 36 Kevin Ross FS; 37 Elbert Shelley CB; 45 Darnell Walker CB; 46 Charles Washington SS; Special teams (ST): 5 Harold Alexander P; 9 Norm Johnson K; 4 Scott Tyner P/K	Practice squad: 89 Harrison Houston WR; 15 Joseph Rogers WR; Reserve: 19 Corey Dixon WR (IR); 47 Roger Harper S (IR); 22 Alton Montgomery S (IR); 90 Chuck Smith DE (IR); 53 active, 4 inactive, 2 practice squad Rookies in italics

== Regular season ==
=== Schedule ===
Week	Date	Opponent	Result	Record	Venue	Recap
1	September 4	at Detroit Lions	**L** 28–31 (OT)	0–1	Pontiac Silverdome	Recap
2	September 11	**Los Angeles Rams**	**W** 31–13	1–1	Georgia Dome	Recap
3	September 18	Kansas City Chiefs	**L** 10–30	1–2	Georgia Dome	Recap
4	September 25	at Washington Redskins	**W** 27–20	2–2	RFK Stadium	Recap
5	October 2	at **Los Angeles Rams**	**W** 8–5	3–2	Anaheim Stadium	Recap
6	October 9	Tampa Bay Buccaneers	**W** 34–13	4–2	Georgia Dome	Recap
7	October 16	**San Francisco 49ers**	**L** 3–42	4–3	Georgia Dome	Recap
8	October 23	at Los Angeles Raiders	**L** 17–30	4–4	Los Angeles Memorial Coliseum	Recap
9	Bye					
10	November 6	San Diego Chargers	**W** 10–9	5–4	Georgia Dome	Recap
11	November 13	at **New Orleans Saints**	**L** 32–33	5–5	Louisiana Superdome	Recap
12	November 20	at Denver Broncos	**L** 28–32	5–6	Mile High Stadium	Recap
13	November 27	Philadelphia Eagles	**W** 28–21	6–6	Georgia Dome	Recap
14	December 4	at **San Francisco 49ers**	**L** 14–50	6–7	Candlestick Park	Recap
15	December 11	**New Orleans Saints**	**L** 20–29	6–8	Georgia Dome	Recap
16	December 18	at Green Bay Packers	**L** 17–21	6–9	Milwaukee County Stadium	Recap
17	December 24	Arizona Cardinals	**W** 10–6	7–9	Georgia Dome	Recap
Note: Intra-division opponents are in **bold** text.

=== Standings ===
NFC West
	W	L	T	PCT	PF	PA	STK
^{(1)} San Francisco 49ers	13	3	0	.813	505	296	L1
New Orleans Saints	7	9	0	.438	348	407	W1
Atlanta Falcons	7	9	0	.438	317	385	W1
Los Angeles Rams	4	12	0	.250	286	365	L7

== Awards and records ==
- Terance Mathis, Franchise Record, Most Receptions in One Season, 111 Receptions
