= 1994 Los Angeles Raiders season =

NFL team season (final season in Los Angeles)

- Owner: Al Davis
- General manager: Al Davis
- Head coach: Art Shell
- Home stadium: L.A. Memorial Coliseum

Results
- Record: 9–7
- Division place: 3rd AFC West
- Playoffs: Did not qualify
- Pro Bowlers: 6: PR Tim Brown; G Kevin Gogan; QB Jeff Hostetler; CB Terry McDaniel; DT Chester McGlockton; G Steve Wisniewski

The 1994 Los Angeles Raiders season was the franchise's 35th season overall, and the franchise's 25th season in the National Football League. They failed to improve on their 10–6 record from 1993 and missed the playoffs for the second time in three years. The Raiders would return to their original home in Oakland the following season.

== Offseason ==
=== NFL draft ===
1994 Los Angeles Raiders draft
Round	Pick	Player	Position	College	Notes
1	22	Rob Fredrickson	Linebacker	Michigan State	
2	52	James Folston	Linebacker	Louisiana–Monroe	
3	80	Calvin Jones	Running back	Nebraska	
4	120	Austin Robbins	Defensive tackle	North Carolina	
5	159	Roosevelt Patterson	Guard	Alabama	
7	217	Rob Holmberg	Linebacker	Penn State	
Made roster

== Personnel ==
=== Staff / Coaches ===
1994 Los Angeles Raiders staff
Front office: President of the General Partner – Al Davis; Director of Football Operations – Steve Ortmayer; Senior Executive – John Herrera; Head coaches: Head coach – Art Shell; Offensive coaches: Offense – Tom Walsh; Offensive backs – Jack Reilly; Wide receivers – Fred Biletnikoff; Tight ends – Bob Mischak; Offensive line – Bill Meyers; Offensive line – Mike White	Defensive coaches: Defense – John Fox; Defensive line – Gunther Cunningham; Defensive line – Ray Hamilton; Linebackers – Jim Haslett; Defensive backs – Odis McKinney; Defensive backs – Jack Stanton; Special teams coaches: Special teams – Steve Ortmayer; Strength and conditioning: Strength and conditioning – Doug Wilkerson

=== Roster ===
1994 Los Angeles Raiders roster
Quarterbacks (QB): 11 Vince Evans; 9 Billy Joe Hobert; 15 Jeff Hostetler; Running backs (RB): 49 Wes Bender; 27 Calvin Jones; 21 Tyrone Montgomery; 44 Tom Rathman FB; 22 Harvey Williams; Wide receivers (WR): 81 Tim Brown PR; 80 Daryl Hobbs; 86 Rocket Ismail KR; 82 James Jett; 89 Alexander Wright; Tight ends (TE): 84 John Duff; 87 Andrew Glover; 88 Jamie Williams	Offensive linemen (OL): 66 Kevin Gogan G; 64 Robert Jenkins T; 65 Max Montoya G; 72 Don Mosebar C; 71 Gerald Perry T; 78 Greg Skrepenak T; 77 Rich Stephens G; 68 Bruce Wilkerson T; 76 Steve Wisniewski G; Defensive linemen (DL): 93 Jerry Ball DT; 56 Aundray Bruce DE; 70 Scott Davis DE/DT; 74 Nolan Harrison DE/DT; 91 Chester McGlockton DT; 95 Austin Robbins DE/DT; 94 Anthony Smith DE; 96 Alberto White DE	Linebackers (LB): 54 Greg Biekert MLB; 55 James Folston OLB; 53 Rob Fredrickson OLB; 57 Rob Holmberg OLB; 52 Mike Jones MLB; 99 Winston Moss OLB; 51 Aaron Wallace OLB; Defensive backs (DB): 33 Eddie Anderson FS; 24 Patrick Bates SS; 40 Cary Brabham FS; 47 Donald Frank CB; 20 Derrick Hoskins SS; 25 Dan Land CB/S; 29 Albert Lewis CB; 36 Terry McDaniel CB; 37 James Trapp CB; 48 Lionel Washington CB; Special teams (ST): 7 Jeff Gossett P; 18 Jeff Jaeger K; 67 Dan Turk LS	Practice squad: 19 John Morton WR; 23 John Reece S; 61 Willie Stubbins T; 26 Charlie Young RB; Reserve: 41 Napoleon McCallum RB (IR); 28 Greg Robinson RB (PUP); 53 active, 2 inactive, 4 practice squad Rookies in italics

== Regular season ==
=== Schedule ===
Week	Date	Opponent	Result	Record	Venue	Attendance	Recap
1	September 5	at San Francisco 49ers	**L** 14–44	0–1	Candlestick Park	68,032	Recap
2	September 11	**Seattle Seahawks**	**L** 9–38	0–2	Los Angeles Memorial Coliseum	47,319	Recap
3	September 18	at **Denver Broncos**	**W** 48–16	1–2	Mile High Stadium	75,764	Recap
4	September 25	**San Diego Chargers**	**L** 24–26	1–3	Los Angeles Memorial Coliseum	55,385	Recap
5	Bye						
6	October 9	at New England Patriots	**W** 21–17	2–3	Foxboro Stadium	59,889	Recap
7	October 16	at Miami Dolphins	**L** 17–20	2–4	Joe Robbie Stadium	70,112	Recap
8	October 23	Atlanta Falcons	**W** 30–17	3–4	Los Angeles Memorial Coliseum	42,192	Recap
9	October 30	Houston Oilers	**W** 17–14	4–4	Los Angeles Memorial Coliseum	40,473	Recap
10	November 6	at **Kansas City Chiefs**	**L** 3–13	4–5	Arrowhead Stadium	78,709	Recap
11	November 13	at Los Angeles Rams	**W** 20–17	5–5	Anaheim Stadium	65,208	Recap
12	November 20	New Orleans Saints	**W** 24–19	6–5	Los Angeles Memorial Coliseum	41,722	Recap
13	November 27	Pittsburgh Steelers	**L** 3–21	6–6	Los Angeles Memorial Coliseum	58,327	Recap
14	December 5	at **San Diego Chargers**	**W** 24–17	7–6	Jack Murphy Stadium	63,012	Recap
15	December 11	**Denver Broncos**	**W** 23–13	8–6	Los Angeles Memorial Coliseum	60,016	Recap
16	December 18	at **Seattle Seahawks**	**W** 17–16	9–6	Kingdome	53,301	Recap
17	December 24	**Kansas City Chiefs**	**L** 9–19	9–7	Los Angeles Memorial Coliseum	64,130	Recap
Note: Intra-division opponents are in **bold** text.

=== Standings ===
AFC West
	W	L	T	PCT	PF	PA	STK
^{(2)} San Diego Chargers	11	5	0	.688	381	306	W2
^{(6)} Kansas City Chiefs	9	7	0	.563	319	298	W2
Los Angeles Raiders	9	7	0	.563	303	327	L1
Denver Broncos	7	9	0	.438	347	396	L3
Seattle Seahawks	6	10	0	.375	287	323	L2

== Season summary ==
=== Week 3 ===
Team	1	2	3	4	Total
• Raiders	21	7	10	10	48
Broncos	3	0	13	0	16

- Date: September 18
- Location: Mile High Stadium
- Game start: 4:00 p.m. EST
- Game attendance: 75,764
- Game weather: 68 °F (20 °C); wind 9 mph (14 km/h)
- Referee: Gordon McCarter
- TV announcers (NBC): Dick Enberg and Bob Trumpy

Scoring summary
Q1		LA	Williams 2 yard run (Jaeger kick)	LA 7–0
Q1		DEN	Elam 43 yard field goal	LA 7–3
Q1		LA	Montgomery 65 yard pass from Hostetler (Jaeger kick)	LA 14–3
Q1		LA	Brown 43 yard pass from Hostetler (Jaeger kick)	LA 21–3
Q2		LA	Glover 7 yard pass from Hostetler (Jaeger kick)	LA 28–3
Q3		DEN	Russell 1 yard run (run failed)	LA 28–9
Q3		LA	Williams 5 yard pass from Hostetler (Jaeger kick)	LA 35–9
Q3		DEN	Russell 4 yard run (Elam kick)	LA 35–16
Q3		LA	Jaeger 42 yard field goal	LA 38–16
Q4		LA	Jaeger 33 yard field goal	LA 41–16
Q4	9:15	LA	McDaniel 15 yard interception return (Jaeger kick)	LA 48–16

=== Week 10 ===
Team	1	2	3	4	Total
Raiders	0	3	0	0	3
• Chiefs	0	7	3	3	13

- Date: November 6
- Location: Arrowhead Stadium Kansas City, Missouri
- Game start: 8:00pm EST
- Game attendance: 78,709
- Game weather: 46 °F (8 °C) • 8 miles per hour (13 km/h; 7.0 kn)
- Referee: Dick Hantak
- TV announcers (ESPN Sunday Night Football): Mike Patrick, Joe Theisman, and Mark Malone (sideline)

Starting QBs=Jeff Hostetler - Los Angeles Raiders vs Joe Montana - Kansas City Chiefs

=== Week 11 ===
Week Eleven: Los Angeles Raiders (4–5) at Los Angeles Rams (4–5)

Quarter	1	2	3	4	Total
Raiders	7	7	0	6	20
Rams	7	0	0	10	17

at Anaheim Stadium, Anaheim, California

- Date: November 13
- Game time: 1:00 p.m. PST
- Game weather: 56 °F (13 °C), wind 6 mph (9.7 km/h)
- TV: NBC
- Pro-Football-Reference.com

Game information

First quarter

- RAI – Andrew Glover 27 yard pass from Jeff Hostetler (Jeff Jaeger kick) – Raiders 7–0
- RAM – Flipper Anderson 22 yard pass from Chris Chandler (Tony Zendejas kick) – Tied 7–7

Second quarter

- RAI – Raghib Ismail 10 yard pass from Jeff Hostetler (Jeff Jaeger kick) – Raiders 14–7

Fourth quarter

- RAI – Jeff Jaeger 44 yard field goal – Raiders 17–7
- RAM – Tony Zendejas 22 yard field goal – Raiders 17–10
- RAI – Jeff Jaeger 47 yard field goal – Raiders 20–10
- RAM – Todd Kinchen 4 yard pass from Chris Miller (Tony Zendejas kick) – Raiders 20–17

Raiders

- Jeff Hostetler
  17/25, 218 Yds, 2 TD, INT
- Harvey Williams
  21 Rush, 44 Yds
- Tim Brown
  5 Rec, 53 Yds

Rams

- Chris Chandler
  10/11, 171 Yds, TD
- Jerome Bettis
  10 Rush, 13 Yds
- Flipper Anderson
  5 Rec, 105 Yds
