= Anthony Phillips (defensive back) =

American football player (born 1970)

No. 26, 28
- Position: Cornerback

Personal information
- Born: October 5, 1970 (age 56); Galveston, Texas, U.S.
- Listed height: 6 ft 2 in (1.88 m)
- Listed weight: 209 lb (95 kg)

Career information
- High school: Ball (Galveston)
- College: Texas A&M–Kingsville
- NFL draft: 1994: 3rd round, 72nd overall pick

Career history
- Atlanta Falcons (1994–1996); Minnesota Vikings (1998); Grand Rapids Rampage (2000–2001); Buffalo Destroyers (2001)

Awards and highlights
- Arena Bowl champion (2001)

Career NFL statistics
- Total tackles: 56
- Interceptions: 2
- Stats at Pro Football Reference

Career AFL statistics
- Tackles: 34
- Passes defended: 14
- Fumble recoveries: 1
- Stats at ArenaFan.com

Anthony Dwayne Phillips (born October 5, 1970) is an American former professional football player who was a defensive back in the National Football League (NFL) for the Atlanta Falcons and Minnesota Vikings. He played college football for the Texas A&M–Kingsville Javelinas. He also played in the Arena Football League (AFL) for the Grand Rapids Rampage and Buffalo Destroyers, winning the Arena Bowl with Grand Rapids in his first season there.

== Professional career ==
After attending Texas A&M–Kingsville, Phillips was selected by the Atlanta Falcons in 1994. He became a rising star with the Falcons, but in his second season, he suffered a gruesome leg injury. During a game against the Buffalo Bills, Phillips intercepted a pass thrown by Buffalo quarterback Jim Kelly, catching the ball at the Atlanta 2-yard line, and was on his way to returning the ball for a defensive touchdown. However, after 43 yards, Kelly himself caught up to Phillips and tackled him while he was running (in bounds) down the side line, with the latter suffering a compound fracture to both his tibia and fibula on his right leg upon landing awkwardly on it. Phillips was required to stay on his back for a month in order for the bones to heal, and Kelly has since apologized for the injury.

Phillips was cut after one additional season with the Falcons. He later signed with the Minnesota Vikings in 1998, but his season ended with a torn ACL. After the season, he played two seasons in the Arena Football League, helping the Grand Rapids Rampage win ArenaBowl XV, before retiring.

== Personal life ==
Raised in Galveston, Texas, Phillips has four children and later settled in Kalamazoo, Michigan. He was diagnosed with kidney failure, stemming from legal steroid usage during his football career.Before Death, He face the pain Gracefully
