= 1994 Denver Broncos season =

American football team season

- Owner: Pat Bowlen
- General manager: John Beake
- Head coach: Wade Phillips
- Offensive coordinator: Jim Fassel
- Defensive coordinator: Charlie Waters
- Home stadium: Mile High Stadium

Results
- Record: 7–9
- Division place: 4th AFC West
- Playoffs: Did not qualify
- Pro Bowlers: QB John Elway; TE Shannon Sharpe; OL Gary Zimmerman; DB Steve Atwater

Uniform
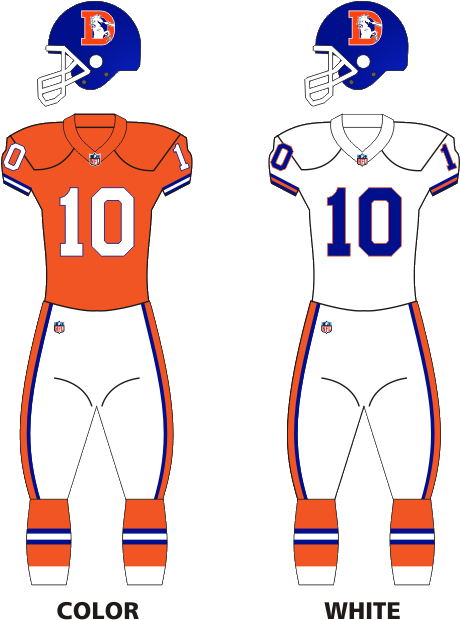

The 1994 Denver Broncos season was the team's 35th year in professional football and its 25th with the National Football League. The season would be the final year that Wade Phillips was head coach. This would also be the final season for longtime defensive stalwarts Karl Mecklenburg and Dennis Smith. This would be the last time the Broncos started 1–5 until 2023.

== Offseason ==
=== NFL draft ===
1994 Denver Broncos draft
Round	Pick	Player	Position	College	Notes
2	51	Allen Aldridge	Linebacker	Houston	
4	123	Randy Fuller	Cornerback	Tennessee State	
7	210	Keith Burns	Linebacker	Oklahoma State	
7	212	Butler By'not'e	Running back	Ohio State	
7	218	Tom Nalen *	Center	Boston College	
Made roster * Made at least one Pro Bowl during career

=== Undrafted free agents ===
1994 undrafted free agents of note
Player	Position	College
Dwayne Carswell	Tight end	Liberty
Derrick Clark	Running back	Evangel
Rod Smith	Wide receiver	Missouri Southern State

== Personnel ==
=== Staff / Coaches ===
1994 Denver Broncos staff
Front office: President and Chief Executive Officer – Pat Bowlen; General Manager – John Beake; Director of Football Operations/Player Personnel – Bob Ferguson; Assistant Director of Player Personnel – Cornell Green; Director of College Scouting – Jeff Smith; Pro Scout – Jack Elway; College Scout – Dave Gettleman; College Scout – Ted Sundquist; Head coaches: Head Coach – Wade Phillips; Assistant Head Coach/Offensive Coordinator – Jim Fassel; Special Assistant to Head Coach/Offense – Harold Richardson; Offensive coaches: Running Backs – Bishop Harris; Wide Receivers – Mo Forte; Tight Ends – Les Steckel; Offensive Line – John Levra	Defensive coaches: Defensive Coordinator – Charlie Waters; Defensive Line – Rex Norris; Linebackers – John Paul Young; Defensive Backs – Leon Fuller; Assistant Defensive Backs/Quality Control – Alvin Reynolds; Special teams coaches: Special Teams/Linebackers – Richard Smith; Strength and conditioning: Strength/Conditioning – Vernon Banks; Assistant Strength/Conditioning and Assistant Defensive Line – Barney Chavous

=== Final roster ===
1994 Denver Broncos roster
Quarterbacks (QB): 7 John Elway; 2 Will Furrer; 17 Hugh Millen; Running backs (RB): 43 Derrick Clark; 22 Glyn Milburn; 38 Reggie Rivers; 41 Deon Strother; Wide receivers (WR): 86 Jeff Campbell; 83 Anthony Miller; 80 Tony Kimbrough; 85 Derek Russell; 87 Cedric Tillman; Tight ends (TE): 89 Dwayne Carswell; 88 Jerry Evans; 84 Shannon Sharpe	Offensive linemen (OL): 60 Joe Burch C; 68 Russell Freeman T; 75 Brian Habib G; 67 Ken Lanier T; 78 Don Maggs G/T; 64 Jon Melander G; 66 Tom Nalen C/G; 76 Kirk Scrafford T; 79 Dave Widell; 65 Gary Zimmerman T; Defensive linemen (DL): 99 Shane Dronett DE; 73 Simon Fletcher DE; 96 Harald Hasselbach DT; 91 Willie Oshodin DE; 94 Jeff Robinson DE; 98 Ted Washington DT; 90 Dan Williams DT	Linebackers (LB): 57 Allen Aldridge OLB; 58 Elijah Alexander OLB; 56 Keith Burns MLB; 51 Mike Croel OLB; 54 Mitch Donahue OLB; 52 Richard Harvey OLB; 50 Ray Jacobs OLB; 77 Karl Mecklenburg MLB; Defensive backs (DB): 27 Steve Atwater SS; 23 Ronnie Bradford CB; 28 Butler B'ynote' CB/KR; 39 Ray Crockett CB; 24 Randy Fuller CB; 40 Darryl Hall SS; 21 Randy Hilliard CB; 31 Rondell Jones FS; 26 Ben Smith CB; 49 Dennis Smith FS; 25 Charles Swann CB; Special teams (ST): 1 Jason Elam K; 16 Tom Rouen P	Practice squad: -- Ryan McCoy LB; 19 Rod Smith WR; Reserve: 33 Rod Bernstine RB (IR); 83 Melvin Bonner WR (IR); 97 Darren Drozdov NT (IR); 72 Keith Kartz C (IR); 61 Bob Meeks C (IR); 81 Mike Pritchard WR (IR); 42 Leonard Russell RB (IR); 92 Dave Wyman LB (IR); Rookies in italics 53 active, 8 reserve, 2 practice squad

== Regular season ==
=== Schedule ===
Week	Date	Opponent	Result	Record	Venue	Attendance	Recap
1	September 4	**San Diego Chargers**	**L** 34–37	0–1	Mile High Stadium	74,032	Recap
2	September 11	at New York Jets	**L** 22–25	0–2	Giants Stadium	73,436	Recap
3	September 18	**Los Angeles Raiders**	**L** 16–48	0–3	Mile High Stadium	75,764	Recap
4	September 26	at Buffalo Bills	**L** 20–27	0–4	Rich Stadium	75,373	Recap
5	Bye						
6	October 9	at **Seattle Seahawks**	**W** 16–9	1–4	Husky Stadium	63,872	Recap
7	October 17	**Kansas City Chiefs**	**L** 28–31	1–5	Mile High Stadium	75,151	Recap
8	October 23	at **San Diego Chargers**	**W** 20–15	2–5	Jack Murphy Stadium	61,626	Recap
9	October 30	Cleveland Browns	**W** 26–14	3–5	Mile High Stadium	73,190	Recap
10	November 6	at Los Angeles Rams	**L** 21–27	3–6	Anaheim Stadium	48,103	Recap
11	November 13	**Seattle Seahawks**	**W** 17–10	4–6	Mile High Stadium	71,290	Recap
12	November 20	Atlanta Falcons	**W** 32–28	5–6	Mile High Stadium	70,594	Recap
13	November 27	Cincinnati Bengals	**W** 15–13	6–6	Mile High Stadium	69,714	Recap
14	December 4	at **Kansas City Chiefs**	**W** 20–17	7–6	Arrowhead Stadium	77,631	Recap
15	December 11	at **Los Angeles Raiders**	**L** 13–23	7–7	Los Angeles Memorial Coliseum	60,016	Recap
16	December 17	at San Francisco 49ers	**L** 19–42	7–8	Candlestick Park	64,884	Recap
17	December 24	New Orleans Saints	**L** 28–30	7–9	Mile High Stadium	64,445	Recap
Note: Intra-division opponents are in **bold** text.

=== Standings ===
AFC West
	W	L	T	PCT	PF	PA	STK
^{(2)} San Diego Chargers	11	5	0	.688	381	306	W2
^{(6)} Kansas City Chiefs	9	7	0	.563	319	298	W2
Los Angeles Raiders	9	7	0	.563	303	327	L1
Denver Broncos	7	9	0	.438	347	396	L3
Seattle Seahawks	6	10	0	.375	287	323	L2

== Season summary ==
=== Week 13 vs Bengals ===
Week Thirteen: Cincinnati Bengals (2–9) at Denver Broncos (5–6)

Quarter	1	2	3	4	Total
Bengals	0	6	0	7	13
Broncos	6	9	0	0	15

at Mile High Stadium, Denver, Colorado

- Date: November 27, 1994
- Game time: 4:00 p.m. EDT
- Game weather: 27 °F (−3 °C)
- Game attendance: 69,714
- Box Score, Box Score

Team	Category	Player	Statistics
Bengals	Passing	Jeff Blake	15/33, 215 Yds, TD, INT
Bengals	Rushing	Steve Broussard	8 Rush, 52 Yds
Bengals	Receiving	Carl Pickens	6 Rec, 132 Yds, TD
Broncos	Passing	John Elway	21/38, 239 Yds, TD
Broncos	Rushing	Leonard Russell	13 Rush, 30 Yds
Broncos	Receiving	Anthony Miller	5 Rec, 116 Yds, TD

Scoring summary

Quarter	Time	Drive			Team	Scoring information	Score	
Quarter	Time	Plays	Yards	TOP	Team	Scoring information	CIN	DEN
1	12:30	7	58		Broncos	34-yard field goal by Jason Elam	0	3
1	4:13	6	4		Broncos	33-yard field goal by Jason Elam	0	6
2	7:19	11	55		Bengals	43-yard field goal by Doug Pelfrey	3	6
2	4:09	7	58		Broncos	Anthony Miller 16-yard touchdown reception from John Elway, 2-point conversion attempt failed	3	12
2	2:57	4	7		Broncos	37-yard field goal by Jason Elam	3	15
2	0:11	11	66		Bengals	32-yard field goal by Doug Pelfrey	6	15
4	14:48	4	80		Bengals	Carl Pickens 70-yard touchdown reception from Jeff Blake, Doug Pelfrey kick good	13	15
"TOP" = time of possession. For other American football terms, see Glossary of American football.							13	15
