= Charles Wilson (American football) =

American football player (born 1968)

No. 88, 84, 89
- Position: Wide receiver

Personal information
- Born: July 1, 1968 (age 58); Tallahassee, Florida, U.S.
- Listed height: 5 ft 10 in (1.78 m)
- Listed weight: 185 lb (84 kg)

Career information
- High school: Amos P. Godby (Tallahassee)
- College: Memphis
- NFL draft: 1990: 5th round, 132nd overall pick

Career history
- Green Bay Packers (1990–1992); San Diego Chargers (1992); Tampa Bay Buccaneers (1992–1994); New York Jets (1995); Tampa Bay Buccaneers (1996)*; Tampa Bay Storm (1999–2000)
- * Offseason or practice squad member only

Awards and highlights
- AFL Rookie of the Year (1999)

Career NFL statistics
- Receptions: 113
- Receiving yards: 1,750
- Touchdowns: 12
- Stats at Pro Football Reference

Career AFL statistics
- Receptions: 82
- Receiving yards: 1,047
- Touchdowns: 30
- Stats at ArenaFan.com

Charles Joseph Wilson II (born July 1, 1968) is an American former professional football player who was a wide receiver for six seasons in the National Football League (NFL). He played college football for the Memphis Tigers from 1986 to 1988, but did not play his senior season. He was selected by the Green Bay Packers in the fifth round of the 1990 NFL draft with the 132nd overall pick. Wilson played in the NFL for the Green Bay Packers (1990–1991), Tampa Bay Buccaneers (1992–1994), and New York Jets (1995). He also played for the Tampa Bay Storm of the Arena Football League (AFL) from 1999 to 2000.
