= Mario Bates =

American football player (born 1973)

No. 24, 31
- Position: Running back

Personal information
- Born: January 16, 1973 (age 53); Victoria, Texas, U.S.
- Listed height: 6 ft 1 in (1.85 m)
- Listed weight: 217 lb (98 kg)

Career information
- High school: Amphitheater (Tucson, Arizona)
- College: Arizona State
- NFL draft: 1994: 2nd round, 44th overall pick

Career history
- New Orleans Saints (1994–1997); Arizona Cardinals (1998–1999); Detroit Lions (2000)

Awards and highlights
- First-team All-Pac-10 (1993)

Career NFL statistics
- Rushing yards: 3,048
- Rushing average: 3.6
- Rushing touchdowns: 38
- Receptions: 65
- Receiving yards: 419
- Stats at Pro Football Reference

Mario Doniel Bates (born January 16, 1973) is an American former professional football player who was a running back in the National Football League (NFL) for the New Orleans Saints, Arizona Cardinals, and the Detroit Lions. He played college football for the Arizona State Sun Devils and was selected in the second round of the 1994 NFL draft.

Playing for Arizona State in 1993, Bates carried the ball 246 times for 1,162 yards with eight touchdowns in 11 games. His brother, Michael, also played in the NFL.

Pre-draft measurables
Height	Weight	Arm length	Hand span	40-yard dash	10-yard split	20-yard split	20-yard shuttle	Vertical jump	Broad jump	Bench press
6 ft 0 5/8 in (1.84 m)	217 lb (98 kg)	33 1/4 in (0.84 m)	9 1/2 in (0.24 m)	4.43 s	1.56 s	2.63 s	4.12 s	36.0 in (0.91 m)	10 ft 8 in (3.25 m)	15 reps

== NFL career statistics ==
Year	Team	Games		Rushing					Receiving				
Year	Team	G	GS	Att	Yds	Avg	Lng	TD	Rec	Yds	Avg	Lng	TD
1994	NO	11	7	151	579	3.8	40	6	8	62	7.8	14	0
1995	NO	16	16	244	951	3.9	66	7	18	114	6.3	26	0
1996	NO	14	10	164	584	3.6	33	4	13	44	3.4	15	0
1997	NO	12	7	119	440	3.7	74	4	5	42	8.4	14	0
1998	ARI	16	1	60	165	2.8	15	6	1	14	14.0	14	0
1999	ARI	16	2	72	202	2.8	16	9	5	34	6.8	18	0
2000	DET	13	0	31	127	4.1	23	2	15	109	7.3	17	0
Career		98	43	841	3,048	3.6	74	38	65	419	6.4	26	0
