= Tyrone Montgomery =

American football player (born 1970)

No. 21
- Position: Running back

Personal information
- Born: August 3, 1970 (age 56); Greenville, Mississippi, U.S.
- Listed height: 6 ft 0 in (1.83 m)
- Listed weight: 190 lb (86 kg)

Career information
- High school: Greenville
- College: Ole Miss
- NFL draft: 1992: undrafted

Career history
- Los Angeles Raiders (1992–1994); St. Louis Rams (1995); Winnipeg Blue Bombers (1997)

Career NFL statistics
- Rushing yards: 203
- Rushing average: 2.8
- Total touchdowns: 1
- Stats at Pro Football Reference

Tyrone Montgomery (born August 3, 1970) is an American former professional football player who was a running back and wide receiver in the National Football League (NFL) for the Los Angeles Raiders and St. Louis Rams from 1992 to 1995. He played college football for the Ole Miss Rebels. He also played professionally for the Winnipeg Blue Bombers of the Canadian Football League (CFL).
