= Jeff George =

American football player (born 1967)

No. 11, 1, 3
- Position: Quarterback

Personal information
- Born: December 8, 1967 (age 58); Indianapolis, Indiana, U.S.
- Listed height: 6 ft 4 in (1.93 m)
- Listed weight: 214 lb (97 kg)

Career information
- High school: Warren Central (Indianapolis)
- College: Purdue (1986); Illinois (1987–1989)
- NFL draft: 1990: 1st round, 1st overall pick

Career history
- Indianapolis Colts (1990–1993); Atlanta Falcons (1994–1996); Oakland Raiders (1997–1998); Minnesota Vikings (1999); Washington Redskins (2000–2001); Seattle Seahawks (2002); Chicago Bears (2004); Oakland Raiders (2006)*
- * Offseason or practice squad member only

Awards and highlights
- NFL passing yards leader (1997); PFWA All-Rookie Team (1990); Sammy Baugh Trophy (1989); First-team All-Big Ten (1989); Second-team All-Big Ten (1988)

Career NFL statistics
- Passing attempts: 3,967
- Passing completions: 2,298
- Completion percentage: 57.9%
- TD–INT: 154–112
- Passing yards: 27,602
- Passer rating: 80.4
- Rushing yards: 307
- Rushing touchdowns: 2
- Stats at Pro Football Reference

Jeffrey Scott George (born December 8, 1967) is an American former professional football quarterback who played in the National Football League (NFL) for 14 seasons. He played college football for the Illinois Fighting Illini, earning the Sammy Baugh Trophy and first-team All-Big Ten honors in 1989.

George was selected first overall by the Indianapolis Colts in the 1990 NFL draft. A member of seven NFL teams, he helped the Atlanta Falcons in 1995 and the Minnesota Vikings in 1999 reach the playoffs and led the league in passing yards in 1997 with the Oakland Raiders. George's NFL career would also be marked by frequent conflicts with coaches and management, which resulted in brief tenures with each of his teams.

== Early life ==
George was born in Indianapolis, Indiana, to an Arab-American family. He attended Warren Central High School, where he received the Dial Award for the national high school scholar-athlete of the year in 1985 and was the first Gatorade National Player of the Year. George attended Purdue University and the University of Illinois Urbana-Champaign.

== College career ==
George transferred after a year at Purdue when the coach who recruited him, Leon Burtnett, resigned. Burtnett's replacement was Fred Akers, who had been known for his teams that used a run-heavy option type offense that required a more mobile quarterback. George subsequently committed to the University of Miami, but he backed out when coach Jimmy Johnson would not guarantee him a starting job. George stayed at Illinois for two years, leaving with a year of eligibility remaining after being assured he would be drafted as one of the first five picks of the NFL draft (he was picked No. 1 overall).

George would finish his college career with 6,212 yards, to go with 35 touchdowns and 35 interceptions, and most notably, an MVP performance against the Virginia Cavaliers in the 1990 Florida Citrus Growers Association Florida Citrus Bowl. In 1989, his final year as a college player, he threw for 2,738 yards, with 22 TD vs 12 INT.

== Professional career ==
=== Indianapolis Colts ===
The Colts traded up to draft George, making him the first pick in the 1990 NFL draft, and signed him to the richest rookie contract in NFL history at the time (worth a total of $15 million). George threw 46 interceptions to 41 touchdowns and lost 35 of his 49 career starts as a Colt; his only winning season with the Colts was 1992, during which he played ten games and threw 15 interceptions to seven touchdowns. Before the 1993 season, he refused to report to training camp and only returned to the team when Jim Irsay made it clear that George would have to pay a huge penalty fee for breach of contract if he did not get back to work. The Colts traded George to the Atlanta Falcons after the 1993 season.

=== Atlanta Falcons ===
In 1995, George led the Falcons to their first playoff appearance since 1991. On September 22, 1996, in a game against the Philadelphia Eagles, George got into a heated argument on the sidelines with Falcons coach June Jones, all of which was caught on camera for a national television audience. Jones suspended George for the remainder of the 1996 season. It was later confirmed that George blamed team management for his problems and felt Jones betrayed him by not standing up to this alleged mistreatment. Years after the incident, Jones became an advocate for George, stating that the TV argument was overblown and that George was a good quarterback, a team player and worthy of being on an NFL roster.

George's record with the Falcons was 16–19. He had the best completion percentage (60.5) of his career with 50 touchdowns and 32 interceptions.

=== Oakland Raiders ===
George signed with the Oakland Raiders for the 1997 NFL season after leaving the Falcons. The Oilers, in their first home game since their controversial relocation from Houston, ruined George's debut (he threw three touchdowns to Tim Brown) by beating the Raiders, 24–21, on an Al Del Greco field goal in overtime. A notable moment for the Silver and Black came in Week 8; against the visiting Broncos, George delivered a workmanlike performance (9–12, 96 yards, 2 TD, 1 INT). Due in large part to Napoleon Kaufman's 227-yard performance on the ground, the host Raiders upset the eventual Super Bowl champions, 28–25. In his eighth year in the NFL, he had arguably his finest statistical year, throwing for 29 touchdown passes and nine interceptions, for a 91.2 passer rating. However, despite George's statistics, the team struggled overall; their defense finished 28th in points allowed. Oakland finished 4–12 in Joe Bugel's one and only season as the Raiders' head coach.

The following year, the offense changed to head coach Jon Gruden's West Coast offense, a controlled-pass approach which did not suit George's strengths. George was inconsistent at the beginning of the year, and later struggled with a groin pull, telling a local radio audience that he was finished for the year. He also ignored the offensive coordinator's play calls during the 1998 season and ran his own plays through a wristband containing plays (in an interview, George told Joe Theismann that he did what the coaches wanted on first and second down, and simply threw it to Tim Brown on third down). The Raiders essentially ended George's Oakland tenure when they signed free-agent quarterback Rich Gannon.

=== Minnesota Vikings ===
After being cut by Oakland, George initially found himself without anywhere to play in 1999; an article at SI.com had several coaches (including Dick Vermeil, Mike Ditka, and Mike Holmgren) go on record about how George wasn't a winner and would not be considered by them despite their own poor/uncertain QB issues. However, the article also said that the Vikings had interest in George at a low salary to be the backup to Randall Cunningham, and George accepted that offer before training camp began. Cunningham struggled at the start of the 1999 season and was benched, and George took over the starting role. In 10 games as a starter George went 8–2 with 23 touchdowns, 8.6 yards per attempt, and a 94.2 rating, in leading Minnesota to the playoffs. George then earned his first career playoff win, throwing three touchdown passes to lead the Vikings over the Dallas Cowboys, 27–10. The Vikings lost the next week to the eventual Super Bowl champion St. Louis Rams, 49–37. Minnesota wanted George to return in 2000 but the combination of him delaying contract talks and the team's confidence that Daunte Culpepper could take over at QB led the Vikings to cut ties with him. George ended up signing with the Washington Redskins.

=== Washington Redskins ===
George hoped to return to Minnesota as a starting quarterback but was told by head coach Dennis Green to "shop around". After attempting to speak to other teams about securing a starting quarterback job, he was eventually offered a one-year, $400,000 contract by Minnesota, with incentives of up to $1.4 million. Rather than sign with the Vikings, George signed a four-year contract worth $14.8 million with the Washington Redskins as Brad Johnson's backup. Johnson went down in week 9; George replaced him and went 1–2 in the next three games. Johnson returned but played poorly against the New York Giants. George replaced him and started two games, both losses, after Norv Turner was fired in favor of interim coach Terry Robiskie. After the season, Johnson departed Washington for Tampa Bay, leaving George as the Redskins' starter going into 2001.

Before the 2001 season, Washington hired as head coach Marty Schottenheimer, who promised to install a West Coast scheme similar to that of Gruden in Oakland. George clashed with Schottenheimer over the offense, though the coach promised to work George through any problems he might have with the scheme. Washington released George after a 37–0 Monday Night loss to the Green Bay Packers, in which George had a 34.6 passer rating, the worst in the first two weeks of the 2001 season, as the team lost both games and were outscored by a combined total of 67–3. George was given 24 hours to remove his personal items from the Redskins' facilities before they were discarded. He was replaced by Tony Banks, who led the team to finish the season with an 8–8 record after they had begun with a record of 0–5.

=== Late career ===
George spent time on the roster of the Seattle Seahawks in late 2002 as an emergency quarterback and the Chicago Bears in 2004, but never took the field. George was not retained by the Bears for the 2005 season, nor was he signed by any other team. The Detroit Lions worked him out during their bye week but did not offer him a contract.

On August 28, 2006, the Oakland Raiders signed George. He was expected to compete for the third-string quarterback position. However, he was released during final cuts only five days later on September 2, 2006.

== NFL career statistics ==
Legend
	Led the league
**Bold**	Career high

Year	Team	Games			Passing									
Year	Team	GP	GS	Record	Cmp	Att	Pct	Yds	Avg	Lng	TD	Int	Rtg	Fum
1990	IND	13	12	5–7	181	334	54.2	2,152	6.4	75	16	13	73.8	0
1991	IND	16	16	1–15	292	485	60.2	2,910	6.0	49	10	12	73.8	**8**
1992	IND	10	10	6–4	167	306	54.6	1,963	6.4	57	7	15	61.5	3
1993	IND	13	11	2–9	234	407	57.5	2,526	6.2	72	8	6	76.3	3
1994	ATL	16	16	7–9	322	524	**61.5**	3,734	7.1	**85**	23	**18**	83.3	4
1995	ATL	16	16	9–7	**336**	**557**	60.3	**4,143**	7.4	62	24	11	89.5	3
1996	ATL	3	3	0–3	56	99	56.6	698	7.0	67	3	3	76.1	1
1997	OAK	16	16	4–12	290	521	55.7	3,917	7.5	76	**29**	9	91.2	5
1998	OAK	8	7	3–4	93	169	55.0	1,186	7.0	75	4	5	72.7	5
1999	MIN	12	10	8–2	191	329	58.1	2,816	**8.6**	80	23	12	**94.2**	7
2000	WAS	6	5	1–4	113	194	58.2	1,389	7.2	50	7	6	79.6	2
2001	WAS	2	2	0–2	23	42	54.8	168	4.0	17	0	3	34.6	0
Career		131	124	46–78	2,298	3,967	57.9	27,602	7.0	85	154	113	80.4	41

== Retirement ==
While George spent time on active NFL rosters through 2006, he had not attempted a pass since the 2001 season with the Washington Redskins. It was speculated that he might have replaced third-string quarterback Marques Tuiasosopo due to his friendship with Randy Moss. Moss has previously stated that George was his favorite of all the quarterbacks he's worked with. He has also commented in the past that he and George would take weekend fishing trips together when they both lived in Minnesota.

On October 30, 2007, during Mike and Mike in the Morning, Michael Kim in a SportsCenter update reported that George was interested in making another comeback, this time with the Minnesota Vikings, a team where he once had some success.

In November 2008, in an appearance on Sirius NFL Radio, George said, "I find it hard to believe there isn't a place in the game for me. My arm feels like I'm 25", he said. "I'm not asking to be a starter, I just want a spot on a team. I still hold out hope I can play in this league. I'm working out three or four days a week, staying ready. Some people might laugh about it. I've been hearing the excuse, 'You're too old,' but I look at guys now playing near 40, and if you can throw it like I can throw it ... Why wouldn't you take a look at me?"

On August 4, 2010, George announced on KFAN Sports radio in Minnesota that he would have been willing to step in for veteran QB Brett Favre if Favre had decided to retire from the Minnesota Vikings.

== Media ==
George has made occasional appearances on NFL Total Access with Rich Eisen and Terrell Davis. Following George's final seasons in the NFL, Jason Whitlock wrote several columns expressing his belief that George could still play and was deserving of an NFL try-out. George and Whitlock are longtime friends, having played high school football together.
