= Michael Husted =

American football player (born 1970)

No. 5, 4, 7
- Position: Placekicker

Personal information
- Born: June 16, 1970 (age 56); El Paso, Texas, U.S.
- Listed height: 6 ft 0 in (1.83 m)
- Listed weight: 190 lb (86 kg)

Career information
- High school: Hampton (Hampton, Virginia)
- College: Virginia
- NFL draft: 1993: undrafted

Career history
- Tampa Bay Buccaneers (1993–1998); Oakland Raiders (1999); Chicago Bears (2000)*; Washington Redskins (2000); Indianapolis Colts (2002)*; Kansas City Chiefs (2002)
- * Offseason or practice squad member only

Career NFL statistics
- Field goals: 142 / 200
- Field goal %: 71%
- Extra points: 192 / 198
- Stats at Pro Football Reference

Michael James Husted (born June 16, 1970) is an American former professional football player who was a placekicker in the National Football League (NFL). He played college football for the Virginia Cavaliers. Husted played in the NFL for nine seasons with four teams. His first six seasons were with the Tampa Bay Buccaneers. He also played for the Oakland Raiders, the Washington Redskins, and the Kansas City Chiefs. He retired after the 2002 season.

== Early life ==
Husted played high school football at Hampton High School in Virginia. During his time, the team played in three state championship games, winning two. Husted earned several awards during his high school career:

- Parade All American honorable mention (Senior year)
- First-team All State kicker (Senior and Junior years)
- First-team All Region kicker (Senior and Junior years)
- First-team All District kicker (Senior and Junior years)

== College career ==
Husted attended the University of Virginia, where was the kickoff specialist during his freshman and sophomore seasons. He then handled all kicking duties his junior and senior seasons.

During his senior campaign, he connected on 13-16 field goals and was named a Lou Groza semi-finalist. Husted also had a total of 95 touchbacks during his college career, the most in UVA history.

== Professional career ==
Husted played in the NFL for nine years. Despite being an undrafted free agent, Husted was signed by the Tampa Bay Buccaneers. He went on to have a successful rookie season, and was named to Football Digest's All Rookie team.

During his time with the Tampa Bay Buccaneers, Michael established several team records including:

- All-time leading scorer (502 pts.)
- Longest field goal (57 yards)
- Most 50+ field goals (10)

In 2000, Husted missed half of his 8 attempts for Washington. Despite having consecutive game-ending winning kicks vs. Tampa Bay and Philadelphia, Husted's overall performance was so bad (he missed 2 kicks against the Eagles and his game-winner was only 24 yards long) that Washington only kept him on the roster for one week after that because they couldn't sign his replacement right away. After that, Husted was cut, and outside of a single made attempt for Kansas City in 2002 he never played in the NFL again.

== Post-football career ==
After his NFL career, Husted was involved in an online start up, "iPlayers.net" in 2005. After the company was acquired by Active Network, LLC in 2007, Husted returned to the athletic and educational world.

Husted subsequently founded "National Camp Series", a series of kicking camps around the country that uses professional kicking coaches. The National Camp Series (NCS) KIX Player Ratings System uses historical data to determine a kickers comparative ranking.
