= Johnny Bailey =

American football player (1967–2010)

No. 22, 20, 21
- Positions: Running back, return specialist

Personal information
- Born: March 17, 1967; Houston, Texas, U.S.
- Died: August 20, 2010 (aged 43); Houston, Texas, U.S.
- Listed height: 5 ft 8 in (1.73 m)
- Listed weight: 190 lb (86 kg)

Career information
- High school: Yates (Houston, Texas)
- College: Texas A&I (1986–1989)
- NFL draft: 1990: 9th round, 228th overall pick

Career history
- Chicago Bears (1990–1991); Phoenix Cardinals (1992–1993); Los Angeles / St. Louis Rams (1994–1995); Iowa Barnstormers (1998)

Awards and highlights
- Pro Bowl (1992); 3× Harlon Hill Trophy (1987–1989); First-team All-American (1989)

Career NFL statistics
- Rushing yards: 832
- Rushing average: 4.4
- Receptions: 161
- Receiving yards: 1,355
- Return yards: 3,840
- Total touchdowns: 9
- Stats at Pro Football Reference
- College Football Hall of Fame

Johnny Lee Bailey (March 17, 1967 – August 20, 2010) was an American professional football player who was a running back in the National Football League (NFL). He played college football for the Texas A&I Javelinas, earning first-team All-American honors in 1989.

== Early life ==
Bailey was also a part of Houston's Yates High School football team when it won the 1985 5A state championship.

== Career ==
Bailey was drafted in the ninth round out of Texas A&I University (now named Texas A&M University–Kingsville) in the 1990 NFL draft by the Chicago Bears. While at Texas A&I, Bailey was the first, and so far only, player to be a three-time winner of the Harlon Hill Trophy, which is given to the best player in Division II college football. He played for the Bears for two years before going on to the Arizona Cardinals for two years, as well as playing for the Los Angeles/St. Louis Rams. During his NFL career he played in 81 games and scored nine touchdowns.

== Death ==
Bailey died on August 20, 2010, of pancreatic cancer. He is buried at the Houston Memorial Gardens in Pearland, Texas.
