= 1994 New Orleans Saints season =

NFL team season

- Head coach: Jim Mora
- Home stadium: Louisiana Superdome

Results
- Record: 7–9
- Division place: 2nd NFC West
- Playoffs: Did not qualify
- Pro Bowlers: T Willie Roaf; DE Wayne Martin

The 1994 New Orleans Saints season was the team's 28th as a member of the National Football League (NFL). They were unable to match their previous season's output of 8–8, winning only seven games. The team failed to qualify for the playoffs for the second consecutive season.

== Offseason ==
=== NFL draft ===
1994 New Orleans Saints draft
| Round | Pick | Player | Position | College | Notes |
| 1 | 13 | Joe Johnson * | Defensive end | Louisville | |
| 2 | 44 | Mario Bates | Running back | Arizona State | |
| 3 | 79 | Winfred Tubbs * | Linebacker | Texas | |
| 4 | 116 | Doug Nussmeier | Quarterback | Idaho | |
| 5 | 142 | Herman Carroll | Defensive end | Mississippi State | |
| 5 | 143 | Craig Novitsky | Guard | UCLA | |
| 6 | 176 | Derrell Mitchell | Wide receiver | Texas Tech | |
| 7 | 213 | Lance Lundberg | Offensive tackle | Nebraska | |
Made roster * Made at least one Pro Bowl during career

=== Undrafted free agents ===
1994 undrafted free agents of note
| Player | Position | College |
|---|---|---|
| Tim Brown | Linebacker | West Virginia |
| Brandon Hamilton | Cornerback | Tulane |

== Personnel ==
=== Staff ===
1994 New Orleans Saints staff
| Front office: Owner/General Partner – Tom Benson; Executive Vice President of Administration – Jim Miller; Vice President of Football Operations – Bill Kuharich; Director of Pro Personnel – Chet Franklin; Director of College Scouting – Bruce Lemmerman; Head coaches: Vice President/Head Coach – Jim E. Mora; Offensive coaches: Offensive Coordinator/Quarterbacks – Carl Smith; Running Backs – Jim Skipper; Wide Receivers – Steve Walters; Offensive Line – John Matsko; Offensive Assistant – Chip Myers | Defensive coaches: Defensive Coordinator – Steve Sidwell; Defensive Line – John Pease; Linebackers – Vic Fangio; Defensive Backs – Jim L. Mora; Defensive Assistant – Everett Withers; Special teams coaches: Special Teams/Tight Ends – Joe Marciano; Strength and conditioning: Strength and Conditioning – Russell Paternostro |

=== Roster ===
1994 New Orleans Saints roster
| Quarterbacks (QB): 17 Jim Everett; 13 Doug Nussmeier; 18 Wade Wilson; Running backs (RB): 24 Mario Bates; 21 Derek Brown; 32 Vaughn Dunbar; 25 Brad Muster FB; 22 Lorenzo Neal; 36 Derrick Ned; Wide receivers (WR): 89 Quinn Early; 81 Michael Haynes; 80 Tyrone Johnson; 88 Derrell Mitchell; 83 Torrance Small; Tight ends (TE): 86 Kirk Botkin LS; 82 Irv Smith; 85 Wesley Walls LS | Offensive linemen (OL): 64 Scott Adams G/T; 72 Jim Dombrowski G; 68 Alan Kline T; 67 Andy McCollum C/G; 60 Craig Novitsky C; 70 Chris Port G; 77 Willie Roaf T; 78 Tom Roth G/T; 63 Jeff Uhlenhake; 65 Willie Williams T; Defensive linemen (DL): 74 Herman Carroll DE; 91 Robert Goff NT; 96 Mark Gunn DE; 94 Joe Johnson DE; 93 Wayne Martin DE; 73 Frank Warren NT | Linebackers (LB): 58 Darion Conner OLB; 56 Ernest Dixon OLB; 51 Sam Mills ILB; 99 Joel Smeenge OLB; 54 Winfred Tubbs ILB; 97 Renaldo Turnbull OLB; 90 James Williams ILB; Defensive backs (DB): 26 Vince Buck FS; 45 Israel Byrd CB; 29 Vinnie Clark CB; 20 Othello Henderson SS; 33 Tyrone Hughes; 27 Selwyn Jones CB; 39 Carl Lee CB; 43 Tyrone Legette CB; 46 Sean Lumpkin SS; 44 J. J. McCleskey CB/FS; 37 Jimmy Spencer CB; Special teams (ST): 7 Morten Andersen K; 6 Tommy Barnhardt P | Practice squad: 38 Ralph Dawkins RB; 40 Chico Nelson S; Reserve: 71 Richard Cooper T (IR); 76 Jeff Davidson G (IR); 98 Jim Hanna NT (IR); 35 Shane Pahukoa S (IR); 84 Steve Rhem WR (IR); 75 Baron Rollins G (IR); 87 Frank Wainright TE (IR); 92 DeMond Winston LB (IR); 53 active, 8 inactive, 2 practice squad Rookies in italics |

== Regular season ==
=== Schedule ===
| Week | Date | Opponent | Result | Record | Venue | Attendance |
|---|---|---|---|---|---|---|
| 1 | September 4 | Kansas City Chiefs | **L** 30–17 | 0–1 | Louisiana Superdome | 69,362 |
| 2 | September 11 | Washington Redskins | **L** 24–38 | 0–2 | Louisiana Superdome | 58,049 |
| 3 | September 18 | at Tampa Bay Buccaneers | **W** 9–7 | 1–2 | Tampa Stadium | 45,522 |
| 4 | September 25 | at **San Francisco 49ers** | **L** 13–24 | 1–3 | Candlestick Park | 63,971 |
| 5 | October 2 | New York Giants | **W** 27–22 | 2–3 | Louisiana Superdome | 55,076 |
| 6 | October 9 | at Chicago Bears | **L** 7–17 | 2–4 | Soldier Field | 63,822 |
| 7 | October 16 | San Diego Chargers | **L** 22–36 | 2–5 | Louisiana Superdome | 50,565 |
| 8 | October 23 | **Los Angeles Rams** | **W** 37–34 | 3–5 | Louisiana Superdome | 47,908 |
| 9 | Bye | | | | | |
| 10 | November 6 | at Minnesota Vikings | **L** 20–21 | 3–6 | Hubert H. Humphrey Metrodome | 57,564 |
| 11 | November 13 | **Atlanta Falcons** | **W** 33–32 | 4–6 | Louisiana Superdome | 60,313 |
| 12 | November 20 | at Los Angeles Raiders | **L** 19–24 | 4–7 | Los Angeles Memorial Coliseum | 41,722 |
| 13 | November 28 | **San Francisco 49ers** | **L** 14–35 | 4–8 | Louisiana Superdome | 61,304 |
| 14 | December 4 | at **Los Angeles Rams** | **W** 31–15 | 5–8 | Anaheim Stadium | 34,960 |
| 15 | December 11 | at **Atlanta Falcons** | **W** 29–20 | 6–8 | Georgia Dome | 61,307 |
| 16 | December 19 | Dallas Cowboys | **L** 24–16 | 6–9 | Louisiana Superdome | 67,323 |
| 17 | December 24 | at Denver Broncos | **W** 30–28 | 7–9 | Mile High Stadium | 64,445 |
Note: Intra-division opponents are in **bold** text.

=== Standings ===
NFC West
| | W | L | T | PCT | PF | PA | STK |
|---|---|---|---|---|---|---|---|
| ^{(1)} San Francisco 49ers | 13 | 3 | 0 | .813 | 505 | 296 | L1 |
| New Orleans Saints | 7 | 9 | 0 | .438 | 348 | 407 | W1 |
| Atlanta Falcons | 7 | 9 | 0 | .438 | 317 | 385 | W1 |
| Los Angeles Rams | 4 | 12 | 0 | .250 | 286 | 365 | L7 |
