= 1994 NFL season =

American football season

- NFL 75th season anniversary logo

Regular season
- Duration: September 4 – December 26, 1994

Playoffs
- Start date: December 31, 1994
- AFC Champions: San Diego Chargers
- NFC Champions: San Francisco 49ers

Super Bowl XXIX
- Date: January 29, 1995
- Site: Joe Robbie Stadium, Miami, Florida
- Champions: San Francisco 49ers

Pro Bowl
- Date: February 5, 1995
- Site: Aloha Stadium

AFC teams: West, Central, East
NFC teams: West, Central, East

The 1994 NFL season was the 75th regular season of the National Football League (NFL). To honor the NFL's 75th season, a special anniversary logo was designed, and each player wore a patch on their jerseys with this logo throughout the season. Also, a selection committee of media and league personnel named a special NFL 75th Anniversary All-Time Team, honoring the best NFL players from the first 75 seasons.

The Phoenix Cardinals changed their name to Arizona Cardinals in an attempt to widen their appeal to the entire state of Arizona instead of just the Phoenix area. The name was initially resisted by team owner Bill Bidwill.

This marked the last season until 2016 that the city of Los Angeles had an NFL team and the last one until 2017 that the city had two. Both the Rams and the Raiders left the city following the season. The Rams moved east to St. Louis, Missouri after being in Los Angeles for 49 years, while the Raiders left after 13 seasons to return to their previous home in Oakland, California. The Rams eventually returned in 2016 followed by the Chargers in 2017 due to a stadium proposal being voted down by most voters in San Diego.

The season ended with Super Bowl XXIX when San Francisco defeated San Diego 49–26 at Joe Robbie Stadium. This was the first season of the 1990s to not feature the Buffalo Bills in the Super Bowl.

This was also the first time in which Christmas Day fell on a Sunday during the regular season. The league established the practice to move most of that weekend's games to the Saturday afternoon of Christmas Eve. Every NFL season afterwards with Christmas Day on a Sunday has followed this same scheduling format. Prior to the 1990 introduction of the bye week, Christmas had fallen within the postseason. In years in which Christmas was on a Sunday, that weekend's games would be split between Saturday, December 24 and Monday, December 26.

The NFL's salary cap was implemented this season.

All six conference division winners were the same as the winners in 1992

== Player movement ==
=== Transactions ===
- July 21: San Francisco signed quarterback Bill Musgrave
- July 21: Indianapolis signed quarterback Don Majkowski
- July 22: Washington signed safety Martin Bayless
- July 22: The New York Giants re-signed sign punter Mike Horan
- July 22: The Los Angeles Rams signed running back Johnny Bailey
- July 23: Philadelphia signed Defensive End Greg Townsend
- July 23 The Los Angeles Raiders signed Tackle Robert Jenkins
- July 25: Indianapolis signed linebacker Scott Radecic
- July 25: Miami signed guard Houston Hoover.
- July 25: Green Bay signed guard Guy McIntyre.
- July 25: Kansas City signed wide receiver Sanjay Beach.
- July 25: Buffalo signed free safety Mike Dumas
- July 25: San Francisco signed Wide Receiver Ed McCaffrey
- July 26: Detroit signed Tight End Rodney Holman
- July 27 Green Bay signed safety Mike Prior
- July 30: Arizona signed safety Andre Waters
- July 30: San Francisco signed running back Marc Logan
- August 31: Minnesota signed punter Mike Saxon.

=== Trades ===
- April 14, 1994: Houston traded quarterback Warren Moon to Minnesota.
- April 24, 1994: Minnesota traded defensive end Chris Doleman as a part of a package involving draft picks to Atlanta.
- July 12, 1994: Detroit traded safety William White to Kansas City.

=== Retirements ===
- January 15: Linebacker Lawrence Taylor announced his retirement immediately following the New York Giants 44-3 loss to the San Francisco 49ers in an NFC divisional playoff. Taylor was a 10-time Pro-Bowler, 10-time All-Pro (eight first-team, two second-team), two time Super Bowl champion (XXI, XXV), 1981 Defensive Rookie of the Year, three time Defensive Player of the Year (1981, 1982, 1986), and 1986 NFL MVP. Taylor played for the New York Giants his entire 13-year career.

=== Draft ===
The 1994 NFL draft was held from April 24 to 25, 1994. With the first pick, the Cincinnati Bengals selected defensive tackle Dan Wilkinson from Ohio State.

== Major rule changes ==
A package of changes were adopted to increase offensive production and scoring:

- The two-point conversion after touchdowns is adopted. However, the defensive two-point conversion would not be adopted until the 2015 season; instead a two-point conversion or extra point automatically was blown dead and ruled as "no good" as soon as the defense gained possession of the ball.
- The spot of the kickoff is moved from the 35-yard line to the 30-yard line; this rule change was reverted prior to the 2011 season.
- The "neutral zone infraction" foul is adopted. A play is automatically dead before the snap when a defensive player enters the neutral zone and causes an offensive player to react.
- After a field goal is missed, the defensive team takes possession of the ball at the spot of the kick (instead of at the line of scrimmage) or the 20-yard line, whichever is farther from the goal line.
- During field goal attempts and extra point tries, players on the receiving team cannot block below the waist.
- The referee shall announce the end of each quarter on his microphone. Prior to 1994, an official (the line judge from 1965 up to 1993) fired a starter's pistol to signal the end of a period.

== Preseason ==
=== American Bowl ===
A series of four pre-season games that were held at sites outside the United States. On July 31, the Los Angeles Raiders defeated Denver at Estadi Olímpic in Barcelona. On August 7, Minnesota defeated Kansas City at the Tokyo Dome in Tokyo. On August 13, the New York Giants defeated San Diego at Olympiastadion in Berlin. On August 15, Houston defeated Dallas at Estadio Azteca in Mexico City.

=== Hall of Fame Game ===
The Pro Football Hall of Fame Game, in which Atlanta defeated San Diego, was played on July 30 at Tom Benson Hall of Fame Stadium in Canton, Ohio, the same city where the league was founded. The 1994 Hall of Fame Class included Tony Dorsett, Bud Grant, Jimmy Johnson, Leroy Kelly, Jackie Smith and Randy White.

== Regular season ==
=== Scheduling formula ===
Inter-conference
AFC East vs NFC Central
AFC Central vs NFC East
AFC West vs NFC West

Highlights of the 1994 season included:

- Shula Bowl: On October 2, Don Shula's Miami Dolphins defeated his son David Shula's Cincinnati Bengals. This marked the first time in NFL history that a head coaching matchup featured father against son.
- Thanksgiving: Two games were played on Thursday, November 24, featuring Buffalo at Detroit and Green Bay at Dallas, with Detroit and Dallas winning.

=== Final standings ===
AFC East
	W	L	T	PCT	PF	PA	STK
^{(3)} Miami Dolphins	10	6	0	.625	389	327	W1
^{(5)} New England Patriots	10	6	0	.625	351	312	W7
Indianapolis Colts	8	8	0	.500	307	320	W2
Buffalo Bills	7	9	0	.438	340	356	L3
New York Jets	6	10	0	.375	264	320	L5

AFC Central
	W	L	T	PCT	PF	PA	STK
^{(1)} Pittsburgh Steelers	12	4	0	.750	316	234	L1
^{(4)} Cleveland Browns	11	5	0	.688	340	204	W1
Cincinnati Bengals	3	13	0	.188	276	406	W1
Houston Oilers	2	14	0	.125	226	352	W1

AFC West
	W	L	T	PCT	PF	PA	STK
^{(2)} San Diego Chargers	11	5	0	.688	381	306	W2
^{(6)} Kansas City Chiefs	9	7	0	.563	319	298	W2
Los Angeles Raiders	9	7	0	.563	303	327	L1
Denver Broncos	7	9	0	.438	347	396	L3
Seattle Seahawks	6	10	0	.375	287	323	L2

NFC East
	W	L	T	PCT	PF	PA	STK
^{(2)} Dallas Cowboys	12	4	0	.750	414	248	L1
New York Giants	9	7	0	.563	279	305	W6
Arizona Cardinals	8	8	0	.500	235	267	L1
Philadelphia Eagles	7	9	0	.438	308	308	L7
Washington Redskins	3	13	0	.188	320	412	W1

NFC Central
	W	L	T	PCT	PF	PA	STK
^{(3)} Minnesota Vikings	10	6	0	.625	356	314	W1
^{(4)} Green Bay Packers	9	7	0	.563	382	287	W3
^{(5)} Detroit Lions	9	7	0	.563	357	342	L1
^{(6)} Chicago Bears	9	7	0	.563	271	307	L1
Tampa Bay Buccaneers	6	10	0	.375	251	351	L1

NFC West
	W	L	T	PCT	PF	PA	STK
^{(1)} San Francisco 49ers	13	3	0	.813	505	296	L1
New Orleans Saints	7	9	0	.438	348	407	W1
Atlanta Falcons	7	9	0	.438	317	385	W1
Los Angeles Rams	4	12	0	.250	286	365	L7

=== Tiebreakers ===
- Miami finished ahead of New England in the AFC East based on head-to-head sweep (2–0).
- Kansas City finished ahead of L.A. Raiders in the AFC West based on head-to-head sweep (2–0).
- Green Bay was the first NFC Wild Card based on best head-to-head record (3–1) vs. Detroit (2–2) and Chicago (1–3) and better conference record (8–4) than the New York Giants (6–6).
- Detroit was the second NFC Wild Card based on better division record (4–4) than Chicago (3–5) and head-to-head victory over N.Y. Giants (1–0).
- Chicago was the third NFC Wild Card based on better record against common opponents (4–4) than N.Y. Giants (3–5).
- New Orleans finished ahead of Atlanta in the NFC West based on head-to-head sweep (2–0).

== Playoffs ==
Dec 31 – Joe Robbie Stadium	Jan 8 – Jack Murphy Stadium
6	Kansas City	17
3	Miami	21
3	Miami	27	Jan 15 – Three Rivers Stadium
2	San Diego	22
AFC
Jan 1 – Cleveland Stadium	2	San Diego	17
Jan 7 – Three Rivers Stadium
1	Pittsburgh	13
5	New England	13	AFC Championship
4	Cleveland	9
4	Cleveland	20	Jan 29 – Joe Robbie Stadium
1	Pittsburgh	29
Wild-card round
Divisional round
Dec 31 – Lambeau Field	A2	San Diego	26
Jan 8 – Texas Stadium
N1	San Francisco	49
5	Detroit	12	Super Bowl XXIX
4	Green Bay	9
4	Green Bay	16	Jan 15 – Candlestick Park
2	Dallas	35
NFC
Jan 1 – Hubert H. Humphrey Metrodome	2	Dallas	28
Jan 7 – Candlestick Park
1	San Francisco	38
6	Chicago	35	NFC Championship
6	Chicago	15
3	Minnesota	18
1	San Francisco	44

== Statistical leaders ==
=== Team ===
Points scored	San Francisco 49ers (505)
Total yards gained	Miami Dolphins (6,078)
Yards rushing	Pittsburgh Steelers (2,180)
Yards passing	New England Patriots (4,444)
Fewest points allowed	Cleveland Browns (204)
Fewest total yards allowed	Dallas Cowboys (4,313)
Fewest rushing yards allowed	Minnesota Vikings (1,090)
Fewest passing yards allowed	Dallas Cowboys (2,752)

=== Individual ===
Scoring	John Carney, San Diego Chargers (135 points)
Touchdowns	Emmitt Smith, Dallas Cowboys (22 TDs)
Most field goals made	John Carney, San Diego Chargers, and Fuad Reveiz, Minnesota Vikings (34 FGs)
Rushing	Barry Sanders, Detroit Lions (1,883 yards)
Passing	Steve Young, San Francisco 49ers (112.8 rating)
Passing touchdowns	Steve Young, San Francisco 49ers (35 TDs)
Pass receiving	Cris Carter, Minnesota Vikings (122 catches)
Pass receiving yards	Jerry Rice, San Francisco 49ers (1,499)
Punt returns	Brian Mitchell, Washington Redskins (14.1 average yards)
Kickoff returns	Mel Gray, Detroit Lions (28.4 average yards)
Interceptions	Eric Turner, Cleveland Browns, and Aeneas Williams, Arizona Cardinals (9)
Punting	Sean Landeta, Los Angeles Rams (44.8 average yards)
Sacks	Kevin Greene, Pittsburgh Steelers (14)

== Awards ==
Most Valuable Player	Steve Young, quarterback, San Francisco 49ers
Coach of the Year	Bill Parcells, New England Patriots
Offensive Player of the Year	Barry Sanders, running back, Detroit Lions
Defensive Player of the Year	Deion Sanders, cornerback, San Francisco 49ers
Offensive Rookie of the Year	Marshall Faulk, running back, Indianapolis Colts
Defensive Rookie of the Year	Tim Bowens, defensive tackle, Miami Dolphins
Comeback Player of the Year	Dan Marino, quarterback, Miami Dolphins
NFL Man of the Year Award	Junior Seau, linebacker, San Diego Chargers
Super Bowl Most Valuable Player	Steve Young, quarterback, San Francisco 49ers

== Coaching changes ==
=== Offseason ===
- Arizona Cardinals: Buddy Ryan replaced the fired Joe Bugel.
- Atlanta Falcons: June Jones replaced the fired Jerry Glanville who became a color commentator for the NFL on Fox prior to the 1994 season.
- Dallas Cowboys: Barry Switzer replaced Jimmy Johnson, who resigned in March 1994.
- New York Jets: Pete Carroll replaced the fired Bruce Coslet.
- Washington Redskins: Norv Turner replaced the fired Richie Petitbon.

=== In-season ===
- Houston Oilers: Jack Pardee was fired after 10 games and was replaced by Jeff Fisher.

== Stadium changes ==
This was the final season of selected Green Bay Packers home games in Milwaukee. Recent upgrades to Lambeau Field started to make it more lucrative for the team to play full-time in Green Bay, while Milwaukee County Stadium, built with baseball in mind, was becoming outdated for football.

The home of the Indianapolis Colts, the Hoosier Dome, was renamed the RCA Dome after RCA acquired the naming rights.

The Seattle Seahawks played their first three regular season home games at Husky Stadium because the Kingdome, the Seahawks' regular home field, was undergoing repairs for damaged tiles on its roof. The Seahawks returned to Husky for the 2000 and 2001 seasons while their new stadium was under construction.

== Uniforms ==
=== Throwback uniforms and games ===
The league honored its 75th season by having each team wear throwback uniforms during selected games. The designs varied widely in their accuracy; many of them were not completely accurate for a number of reasons:

- Although no attempt was made to simulate obsolete leather helmets (which were phased out in the 1950s), teams simulating uniforms from the era of leather headgear (Bears, Cardinals, Lions, Packers, Redskins, Steelers) simply removed all decals and striping from their regular hard-shell helmets.
- All jerseys displayed the players' last names on the back, though this practice did not become standard until 1970.
- The Buffalo Bills and New York Jets' otherwise accurate throwbacks used different colored helmets than their historic uniforms used, being red and green, respectively, instead of white. The Dallas Cowboys wore their then-current helmets with their throwbacks. The Cowboys and the Bills would later adopt a more accurate representation of their 1960s throwbacks as their alternative uniform, while the Jets would move to a style similar to their throwbacks but with a darker shade of green and green facemasks full-time in 1998 (the Jets introduced a more accurate throwback uniform, with a lighter shade of green and gray face masks, in 2024).
- The San Francisco 49ers also used their modern gold helmets with their 1955-inspired throwbacks, as the originals had red helmets. The white uniforms also had all red stripes on the sleeves, instead of the black-red-black pattern of the original. The white throwbacks would return to replace their black Color Rush uniforms in 2019, and the red throwback would also be added into their rotation in 2021.
- In some instances the fonts and typestyles used were only approximate matches at best. The San Diego Chargers and Houston Oilers' throwbacks averted this, being completely accurate replications, including typefaces, of their first uniforms in 1960. The Chargers and the Oilers' successors, the Tennessee Titans, wore these throwbacks again for the American Football League's 50th anniversary celebration during the 2009 season.
- The Cleveland Browns were the only team to not acquire throwbacks or alter any part of the uniform they had. They passed off their all white uniforms as "1964 throwbacks" to honor the Browns 1964 NFL Championship since with the exception of white facemasks, the 1994 all white uniform were similar in design to the 1964 uniform. Many believe Art Modell did this because of the four NFL Championships (1950, 1954, 1955 and 1964) the 1964 team was the only one that Paul Brown was not the Head Coach of and having throwbacks honoring any of the other Browns Championship Teams would be acknowledging Brown, something Modell would not do because of their antagonistic relationship dating back to when Modell purchased the team.
- The Indianapolis Colts also made no changes to their jerseys, helmets, or pants, only wearing striped socks instead of solid blue-topped socks for their throwback games.
- On-field officials working these throwback games wore flat caps similar to the ones that NFL officials wore back in the 1920s, but still had on their regular striped shirts instead of the white dress shirts worn during that era.

Some teams occasionally wore their throwbacks in additional games during the season, and the San Francisco 49ers wore them through the Super Bowl. They proved to be so popular that the New York Giants followed the lead of the Jets (who went back to their 1960s logo in 1998) and eventually returned to wearing them full-time, with very slight modifications, in 2000. After the NFL modified its rules to allow teams to wear alternate jerseys in 2002, the San Diego Chargers selected their throwbacks as their third uniforms.

Instead of wearing their throwbacks in additional games, the Dallas Cowboys celebrated their back-to-back Super Bowl titles by wearing "Double-Star" white alternative jerseys during Thanksgiving and through the playoffs. Similar to their throwbacks, they had blue sleeves and blue stars on each shoulder, but it was the modern star design with white lines and blue borders.

=== Wholesale team changes ===
- The Denver Broncos added trim to the nameplates to match the numbers on both regular jerseys: blue trim on the orange jerseys and orange trim on the white jerseys.
- The Miami Dolphins adopted a new style of numbers on their jerseys: white numbers with orange trim on their aqua jerseys and aqua numbers with orange trim on their white jerseys.
- The New England Patriots switched from red to white numbers on their blue jerseys; gray to red facemasks; and a different red-blue design on the pants stripping.
- The Seattle Seahawks adopted a thinner font for their jersey numbers.

== Television ==
This was the first season that the then-eight-year old Fox network televised NFL games, taking over the NFC package from CBS. ABC, NBC, TNT, and ESPN renewed their rights to televise Monday Night Football, the AFC package, Sunday night games during the first half of the season, and Sunday night games during the second half of the season, respectively. All of these networks signed four-year television contracts through the 1997 season. The league also signed an exclusivity agreement with the new direct broadcast satellite (DBS) service DirecTV to launch NFL Sunday Ticket, a satellite television subscription service offering every Sunday afternoon regular season NFL game.

Fox hired several members from CBS, including its lead broadcast team of Pat Summerall and John Madden; and Dick Stockton and Matt Millen to serve as Fox's #2 team. For the new Fox NFL Sunday pregame show, Fox hired CBS play-by-play announcer James Brown to be the host, and Terry Bradshaw as the show's lead analyst in basically the same role he had on The NFL Today on CBS. The then-recently retired player Howie Long and head coach Jimmy Johnson also joined Fox NFL Sunday.

NBC fired O. J. Simpson after he was charged with murder during the off-season. NBC also hired Greg Gumbel from CBS to become the new host of NFL Live!, replacing Jim Lampley. Ahmad Rashad became the show's new co-host, while Joe Gibbs joined Mike Ditka as the show's analysts.

Between this season and 1997, several existing ABC, NBC, CBS, and Fox affiliates were lost and replaced with new ones as part of the 1994–1996 United States broadcast television realignment.

=== Official NFC team affiliates ===
Team	Affiliate
Arizona Cardinals	KNXV (KSAZ in December)
Atlanta Falcons	WATL (WAGA in December)
Chicago Bears	WFLD
Dallas Cowboys	KDAF
Detroit Lions	WKBD (WJBK in December)
Green Bay Packers	WGBA
Los Angeles Rams	KTTV
Minnesota Vikings	WFTC
New Orleans Saints	WNOL
New York Giants	WNYW
Philadelphia Eagles	WTXF
San Francisco 49ers	KTVU
Tampa Bay Buccaneers	WFTS (WTVT in December)
Washington Redskins	WTTG
