= 1996 St. Louis Rams season =

NFL team season

- Owner: Georgia Frontiere
- General manager: Steve Ortmayer
- Head coach: Rich Brooks
- Offensive coordinator: Jack Reilly
- Defensive coordinator: Willie Shaw
- Home stadium: Trans World Dome

Results
- Record: 6–10
- Division place: 3rd NFC West
- Playoffs: Did not qualify
- Pro Bowlers: None

Uniform
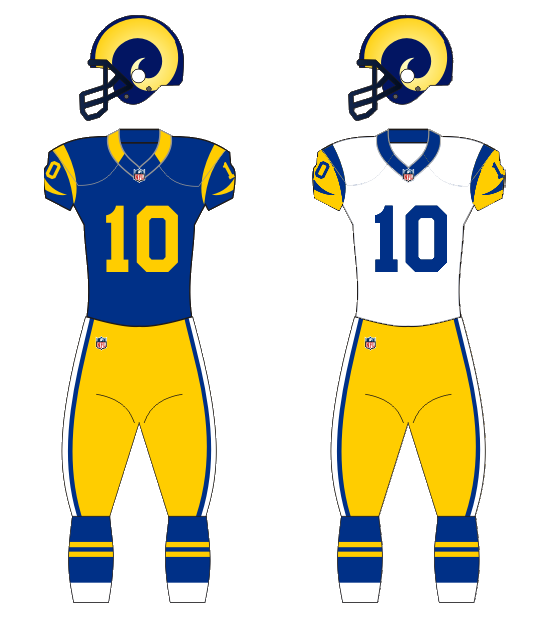

The 1996 St. Louis Rams season was the franchise's 59th year with the National Football League (NFL) and the second season in St. Louis. It was marked by a 59–16 victory over the Atlanta Falcons in week 11. The Rams’ point tally in that game was the highest by an NFL team since 1989, when the Cincinnati Bengals scored 61 points. Safety Keith Lyle tied first for the league lead in interceptions, with 9. However, the Rams finished the season with a 6–10 record. Head coach Rich Brooks was fired after the season. This was also the Rams first full season playing in the Trans World Dome.

== Offseason ==
=== NFL draft ===
1996 St. Louis Rams draft
Round	Pick	Player	Position	College	Notes
1	6	Lawrence Phillips	Running back	Nebraska	from Washington
1	18	Eddie Kennison	Wide receiver	LSU	from Chicago
2	42	Tony Banks	Quarterback	Michigan State	
2	59	Ernie Conwell	Tight end	Washington	from Pittsburgh
3	83	Jerald Moore	Running back	Oklahoma	from Chicago
4	105	Percell Gaskins	Linebacker	Kansas State	
5	141	Fred Miller	Offensive tackle	Baylor	
6	175	Derrick Harris	Running back	Miami (FL)	
6	201	Hayward Clay	Tight end	Texas A&M	from Dallas via Chicago
7	222	Chuck Osborne	Defensive tackle	Arizona	
Made roster * Made at least one Pro Bowl during career

== Personnel ==
=== Staff ===
1996 St. Louis Rams staff
Front office: Chairman – Georgia Frontiere; Vice chairman – Stan Kroenke; President – John Shaw; Senior vice-president – Jay Zygmunt; Vice-president of football operations – Steve Ortmayer; Director of player personnel – John Becker; Head coaches: Head coach – Rich Brooks; Assistant head coach/running backs – Johnny Roland; Offensive coaches: Offensive coordinator/quarterbacks – Jack Reilly; Wide receivers – Mike Martz; Tight ends – John Ramsdell; Offensive line – Steve Greatwood; Offensive line – George Warhop	Defensive coaches: Defensive coordinator – Willie Shaw; Defensive line – Deek Pollard; Linebackers – Dick Selcer; Cornerbacks – Steve Brown; Special teams coaches: Special teams – Nick Aliotti; Strength and conditioning: Strength and conditioning – Chris Clausen

=== Roster ===
1996 St. Louis Rams roster
Quarterbacks (QB): 12 Tony Banks; 10 Jamie Martin; 4 Steve Walsh; Running backs (RB): 30 Harold Green; 34 Derrick Harris; 44 Jerald Moore; 21 Lawrence Phillips; 28 Greg Robinson; Wide receivers (WR): 83 Donnell Baker; 80 Isaac Bruce; 20 Keith Crawford; 88 Eddie Kennison; 82 Jermaine Ross; 87 J. T. Thomas KR; Tight ends (TE): 81 Hayward Clay; 45 Ernie Conwell; 86 Aaron Laing	Offensive linemen (OL): 71 Chuck Belin G; 61 Bern Brostek C/G; 70 Wayne Gandy T; 79 Leo Goeas G; 60 Mike Gruttadauria C; 69 Jesse James C; 73 Fred Miller; 77 Billy Milner T; 67 Dwayne White G; 73 Zach Wiegert T; Defensive linemen (DL): 93 Kevin Carter DE; 75 D'Marco Farr DT; 99 James Harris DE; 65 Jon Kirksey DT; 91 Leslie O'Neal DE; 97 Chuck Osborne DT; 96 Jay Williams DE	Linebackers (LB): 53 Cedric Figaro MLB; 54 Percell Gaskins OLB; 51 Carlos Jenkins OLB; 55 Robert Jones MLB; 58 Roman Phifer OLB; Defensive backs (DB): 46 Torin Dorn CB; 39 Jeremy Lincoln CB; 41 Todd Lyght CB; 35 Keith Lyle FS; 23 Gerald McBurrows SS; 24 Herman O'Berry CB; 27 Anthony Parker CB; 22 Mike Scurlock CB/S; 38 Marquis Walker CB; 32 Toby Wright SS; Special teams (ST): 52 Paschall Davis LS; 6 Carlos Huerta K; 5 Sean Landeta P; 8 Chip Lohmiller K	Practice squad: 36 Marcus Holliday RB; 18 A. C. Tellison WR; 95 Tyrone Williams DT; Reserve: 50 Antonio Goss LB (IR); 57 Thomas Homco LB (IR); 98 Jimmie Jones DT (IR); -- Rico Mack LB (IR); 19 Billy Williams WR (IR); 89 Alexander Wright; 53 active, 6 inactive, 3 practice squad Rookies in italics

== Regular season ==
=== Schedule ===
Week	Date	Opponent	Result	Record	Venue	Attendance
1	September 1	Cincinnati Bengals	**W** 26–16	1–0	Trans World Dome	62,659
2	September 8	at **San Francisco 49ers**	**L** 0–34	1–1	3Com Park	63,624
3	Bye					
4	September 22	Washington Redskins	**L** 10–17	1–2	Trans World Dome	62,303
5	September 29	at Arizona Cardinals	**L** 28–31 (OT)	1–3	Sun Devil Stadium	33,116
6	October 6	**San Francisco 49ers**	**L** 11–28	1–4	Trans World Dome	61,260
7	October 13	at **Carolina Panthers**	**L** 13–45	1–5	Ericsson Stadium	70,535
8	October 20	Jacksonville Jaguars	**W** 17–14	2–5	Trans World Dome	60,066
9	October 27	at Baltimore Ravens	**L** 31–37 (OT)	2–6	Memorial Stadium	60,256
10	November 3	at Pittsburgh Steelers	**L** 6–42	2–7	Three Rivers Stadium	58,148
11	November 10	**Atlanta Falcons**	**W** 59–16	3–7	Trans World Dome	58,776
12	November 17	**Carolina Panthers**	**L** 10–20	3–8	Trans World Dome	60,652
13	November 24	Green Bay Packers	**L** 9–24	3–9	Trans World Dome	61,499
14	December 1	at **New Orleans Saints**	**W** 26–10	4–9	Louisiana Superdome	26,310
15	December 8	at Chicago Bears	**L** 9–35	4–10	Soldier Field	45,075
16	December 15	at **Atlanta Falcons**	**W** 34–27	5–10	Georgia Dome	26,519
17	December 21	**New Orleans Saints**	**W** 14–13	6–10	Trans World Dome	57,681
Note: Intra-division opponents are in **bold** text.

=== Standings ===
NFC West
	W	L	T	PCT	PF	PA	STK
^{(2)} Carolina Panthers	12	4	0	.750	367	218	W7
^{(4)} San Francisco 49ers	12	4	0	.750	398	257	W2
St. Louis Rams	6	10	0	.375	303	409	W2
Atlanta Falcons	3	13	0	.188	309	461	L2
New Orleans Saints	3	13	0	.188	229	339	L1
