= 1996 New Orleans Saints season =

NFL team season

- Head coach: Jim Mora (resigned October 21, 2–6 record); Rick Venturi (interim; 1–7 record)
- Offensive coordinator: Carl Smith
- Defensive coordinator: Jim Haslett
- Home stadium: Louisiana Superdome

Results
- Record: 3–13
- Division place: 5th NFC West
- Playoffs: Did not qualify
- Pro Bowlers: T Willie Roaf

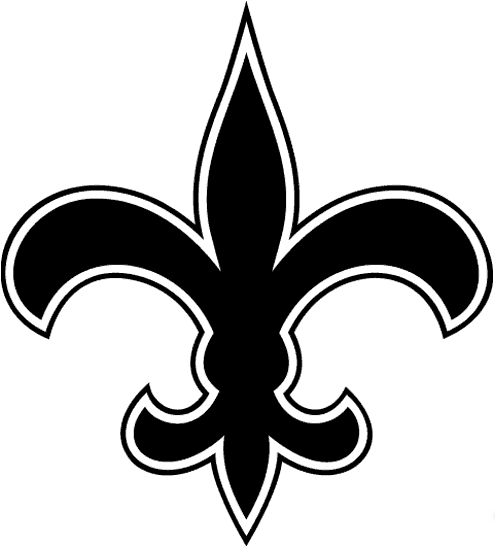
New Orleans Saints' Fleur-de-lis logo, (1967 - 1999)

The 1996 New Orleans Saints season was the team's 30th as a member of the National Football League. They were unable to match their previous season's output of 7–9 and finished with the second-worst sixteen-game record in franchise history at 3–13. The team failed to qualify for the playoffs for the fourth straight year.

Jim Mora, who had been the team's head coach since 1986, resigned from his position after eight games with a 2–6 record to that point and was replaced by linebackers coach Rick Venturi, who went 1–7 to close the season. Mora's resignation came one day after the Saints lost to the Carolina Panthers, where he ripped into his team's performance during the game, calling it “horseshit” and “embarrassing” and saying the Saints could not do “diddley poo” offensively.

The week 14 game vs. the St. Louis Rams drew a minuscule 26,310, the lowest-attended home game in Saints history, and 3,335 fewer than a 1987 game vs. the Rams played with replacement players due to that season's strike by the National Football League Players Association. After the season, Jim Dombrowski, who had been with the team since 1986, retired.

== Offseason ==
=== NFL draft ===
1996 New Orleans Saints draft
Round	Pick	Player	Position	College	Notes
1	11	Alex Molden	Cornerback	Oregon	
2	40	Je'Rod Cherry	Defensive back	California	
3	70	Brady Smith	Defensive end	Colorado State	
4	103	Ricky Whittle	Running back	Oregon	
5	136	Mercury Hayes	Wide receiver	Michigan	
5	145	Tom Ackerman	Guard	Eastern Washington	
5	165	Terry Guess	Wide receiver	Gardner–Webb	
6	179	Keno Hills	Guard	Louisiana–Lafayette	
6	204	Toderick Malone	Wide receiver	Alabama	
7	246	Henry Lusk	Tight end	Utah	
Made roster

== Personnel ==
1996 New Orleans Saints staff
Front office: Owner – Tom Benson; Executive vice-president/general manager – Bill Kuharich; Director of pro personnel – Chet Franklin; Director of college scouting – Bruce Lemmerman; Head coaches: Head coach – Jim E. Mora (resigned October 21); Offensive coaches: Offensive coordinator/quarterbacks – Carl Smith; Running backs – Dave Atkins; Wide receivers – Steve Walters; Tight ends – Bruce Arians; Offensive line – John Matsko; Offensive assistant – Jeff Davidson	Defensive coaches: Defensive coordinator – Jim Haslett; Defensive line – Wayne Nunnely; Linebackers – Rick Venturi (elevated to interim head coach October 21); Defensive backs – Jim L. Mora; Defensive assistant – John Pagano; Special teams coaches: Special teams – Bobby April; Strength and conditioning: Strength and conditioning – Russell Paternostro; Strength and Conditioning Assistant – Glenn Mayeaux

== Roster ==
1996 New Orleans Saints roster
Quarterbacks (QB): 17 Jim Everett; 14 Tommy Hodson; 13 Doug Nussmeier; Running backs (RB): 24 Mario Bates; 20 Derek Brown; 32 Earnest Hunter; 22 Lorenzo Neal; 23 Ricky Whittle; Wide receivers (WR): 19 Brett Bech; 87 Lee DeRamus; 18 Terry Guess; 89 Mercury Hayes; 81 Michael Haynes; 83 Torrance Small; Tight ends (TE): 85 Paul Green; 86 Tony Johnson; 88 Henry Lusk	Offensive linemen (OL): 69 Tom Ackerman C/G; 76 Keno Hills T; 74 Clarence Jones T; 61 Ed King G; 67 Andy McCollum C; 60 Craig Novitsky G; 77 Willie Roaf T; 66 Mike Verstegen G/T; 63 Donald Willis G; Defensive linemen (DL): 94 Joe Johnson DE/DT; 93 Wayne Martin DT; 92 Darren Mickell DE; 75 Emile Palmer DT; 95 Austin Robbins DT; 91 Brady Smith DE; 97 Renaldo Turnbull DE	Linebackers (LB): 53 Don Davis OLB; 56 Ernest Dixon OLB; 55 Mark Fields OLB; 52 Richard Harvey OLB; 58 Brian Jones MLB; 59 Rufus Porter OLB; 54 Winfred Tubbs MLB; Defensive backs (DB): 21 Eric Allen CB; 37 Je'Rod Cherry FS; 28 Derrick Hoskins SS; 33 Tyrone Hughes; 47 Greg Jackson FS; 29 Mark McMillian CB; 25 Alex Molden CB; 30 Anthony Newman SS; 41 William Strong CB; Special teams (ST): 10 Doug Brien K; 62 Kendall Gammon LS; 4 Klaus Wilmsmeyer P	Practice squad: 98 Herb Coleman DE; 40 Don Esposito RB; 64 Kevin Farkas T; Reserve: 99 Willie Broughton DT (IR); 45 Israel Byrd CB (NF-Inj.); 72 Jim Dombrowski G (IR); 80 Haywood Jeffires WR (IR); 46 Sean Lumpkin FS (IR); 84 Steve Rhem WR (IR); 82 Irv Smith TE (IR); 71 Fred Stokes DE (IR); 34 Ray Zellars FB (IR); 52 active, 9 inactive, 3 practice squad Rookies in italics

== Regular season ==
=== Schedule ===
Week	Date	Opponent	Result	Record	Venue	Attendance
1	September 1	at **San Francisco 49ers**	**L** 11–27	0–1	3Com Park	63,970
2	September 8	**Carolina Panthers**	**L** 20–22	0–2	Louisiana Superdome	43,288
3	September 15	at Cincinnati Bengals	**L** 15–30	0–3	Cinergy Field	45,412
4	September 22	Arizona Cardinals	**L** 14–28	0–4	Louisiana Superdome	34,316
5	September 29	at Baltimore Ravens	**L** 10–17	0–5	Memorial Stadium	61,063
6	October 6	Jacksonville Jaguars	**W** 17–13	1–5	Louisiana Superdome	34,231
7	October 13	Chicago Bears	**W** 27–24	2–5	Louisiana Superdome	43,512
8	October 20	at **Carolina Panthers**	**L** 7–19	2–6	Ericsson Stadium	70,888
9	Bye					
10	November 3	**San Francisco 49ers**	**L** 17–24	2–7	Louisiana Superdome	53,297
11	November 10	Houston Oilers	**L** 14–31	2–8	Louisiana Superdome	34,121
12	November 17	at **Atlanta Falcons**	**L** 15–17	2–9	Georgia Dome	43,119
13	November 24	at Tampa Bay Buccaneers	**L** 7–13	2–10	Houlihan's Stadium	40,203
14	December 1	**St. Louis Rams**	**L** 10–26	2–11	Louisiana Superdome	26,310
15	December 8	**Atlanta Falcons**	**L** 15–31	2–12	Louisiana Superdome	32,923
16	December 15	at New York Giants	**W** 17–3	3–12	Giants Stadium	52,530
17	December 21	at **St. Louis Rams**	**L** 13–14	3–13	Trans World Dome	57,681
Note: Intra-division opponents are in **bold** text.

=== Standings ===
NFC West
	W	L	T	PCT	PF	PA	STK
^{(2)} Carolina Panthers	12	4	0	.750	367	218	W7
^{(4)} San Francisco 49ers	12	4	0	.750	398	257	W2
St. Louis Rams	6	10	0	.375	303	409	W2
Atlanta Falcons	3	13	0	.188	309	461	L2
New Orleans Saints	3	13	0	.188	229	339	L1
