= 1996 San Francisco 49ers season =

American football team season

- Owner: Edward J. DeBartolo Jr.
- General manager: Carmen Policy
- Head coach: George Seifert
- Offensive coordinator: Marc Trestman
- Defensive coordinator: Pete Carroll
- Home stadium: 3Com Park

Results
- Record: 12–4
- Division place: 2nd NFC West
- Playoffs: Won Wild Card Playoffs (vs. Eagles) 14–0; Lost Divisional Playoffs (at Packers) 14–35
- Pro Bowlers: QB Steve Young; WR Jerry Rice; DT Bryant Young; FS Merton Hanks

The 1996 San Francisco 49ers season was the club's 51st since its inception. In commemoration, the 49ers wore a special 50th anniversary patch. They also wore a new uniform reminiscent of the 1994 throwback uniforms with white pants and shadowed numbers, but with a darker shade of red and an updated logo. The franchise tied for first place in the NFC West with a 12–4 record, but lost the division title to the Carolina Panthers on the division-record tiebreaker (the Panthers had swept the Niners in the season). The 49ers ranked 3rd in the league in points scored and 4th in fewest points allowed.

Although the team was competitive the entire season, nagging and recurring injuries to offensive players and an inconsistent running game contributed to a what was considered a disappointing season. After a 14–0 wild-card playoff victory over the Philadelphia Eagles, the 49ers were defeated by the Green Bay Packers in the divisional playoffs 35–14. This ended up being George Seifert's final season as the 49ers' head coach and also the final San Francisco season for defensive coordinator Pete Carroll, who would become the head coach of the New England Patriots the following season.

== Offseason ==
The 49ers tried to sign Giants running back Rodney Hampton in the offseason (signing him to an offer sheet) but to no avail.

=== NFL draft ===
1996 San Francisco 49ers draft
Round	Pick	Player	Position	College	Notes
2	46	Israel Ifeanyi	Defensive end	USC	
3	89	Terrell Owens * ^{†}	Wide receiver	Chattanooga	
4	128	Daryl Price	Defensive end	Colorado	
5	160	Iheanyi Uwaezuoke	Wide receiver	California	
6	198	Stephen Pitts	Running back	Penn State	
7	239	Sean Manuel	Tight end	New Mexico State	
7	254	Sam Manuel	Linebacker	New Mexico State	
Made roster † Pro Football Hall of Fame * Made at least one Pro Bowl during career

== Personnel ==
After concerns and criticisms of Marc Trestman's offensive play calling, in his first year, the 49ers brought back former coach Bill Walsh to act as an administrative assistant, largely to help coach Trestman orchestrate the technical side of the West Coast Offense.

=== Staff ===
1996 San Francisco 49ers staff
Front office: Owner – Edward J. DeBartolo, Jr.; President – Carmen Policy; Vice President and Director of Football Operations – Dwight Clark; Director of Player Personnel – Vinny Cerrato; Administrative Assistant to the Coaching Staff – Bill Walsh; Head coaches: Head Coach – George Seifert; Assistant Head Coach – Bill McPherson; Offensive coaches: Offensive Coordinator – Marc Trestman; Quarterbacks – Matt Cavanaugh; Running Backs – Carl Jackson; Receivers – Larry Kirksey; Tight Ends/Offensive Line Assistant – Mike Solari; Offensive Line – Bobb McKittrick; Offensive Assistant – Greg Knapp	Defensive coaches: Defensive Coordinator – Pete Carroll; Defensive Line – Dwaine Board; Linebackers – John Marshall; Defensive Backs – Johnnie Lynn; Defensive Assistant – Bo Pelini; Special teams coaches: Special Teams – George Stewart; Strength and conditioning: Physical Development Coordinator – Jerry Attaway; Strength Development Coordinator – Michael Barnes

=== Roster ===
1996 San Francisco 49ers roster
Quarterbacks (QB): 11 Jeff Brohm; 18 Elvis Grbac; 8 Steve Young; Running backs (RB): 35 Dexter Carter; 40 William Floyd FB; 41 Terry Kirby; 20 Derek Loville; 29 Anthony Lynn; 44 Tommy Vardell FB; Wide receivers (WR): 17 Mike Caldwell; 81 Terrell Owens; 80 Jerry Rice; 89 Iheanyi Uwaezuoke; Tight ends (TE): 49 Adrian Cooper; 84 Brent Jones; 85 Ted Popson	Offensive linemen (OL): 79 Harris Barton T; 65 Ray Brown G; 67 Chris Dalman G; 63 Derrick Deese G; 77 Tim Hanshaw G; 69 Rod Milstead G; 75 Frank Pollack T; 61 Jesse Sapolu C; 76 Kirk Scrafford T; 74 Steve Wallace T; Defensive linemen (DL): 92 Roy Barker DE; 78 Michael Brandon DE; 96 Dennis Brown DE; 90 Junior Bryant DT; 56 Chris Doleman DE; 95 Israel Ifeanyi DE; 91 Daryl Price DE; 94 Dana Stubblefield DT; 97 Bryant Young DT	Linebackers (LB): 99 Daved Benefield OLB; 55 Kevin Mitchell MLB; 51 Ken Norton Jr. MLB; 53 Tony Peterson OLB; 50 Gary Plummer OLB; 54 Lee Woodall OLB; Defensive backs (DB): 28 Curtis Buckley SS; 33 Dedrick Dodge FS; 22 Tyronne Drakeford CB; 36 Merton Hanks FS; 31 Steve Israel CB; 46 Tim McDonald SS; 23 Marquez Pope CB; 30 Mike Salmon CB/S; 27 Frankie Smith CB; Special teams (ST): 57 Randy Kirk LS; 3 Tommy Thompson P; 14 Jeff Wilkins K	Practice squad: 19 Mark Harris WR; 71 Albert Reese DT; Reserve: 86 Sean Manuel TE (IR); 88 Nate Singleton WR (IR); 83 J. J. Stokes WR (IR); 53 active, 3 inactive, 2 practice squad Rookies in italics

== Preseason ==
Week	Date	Opponent	Result	Record	Venue
1	August 3	Denver Broncos	L 17–20	0–1	3Com Park
2	August 10	San Diego Chargers	W 16–13 (OT)	1–1	3Com Park
3	August 18	at Jacksonville Jaguars	L 10–38	1–2	Jacksonville Municipal Stadium
4	August 23	at Seattle Seahawks	L 3–20	1–3	Kingdome

== Regular season ==
After the 1995 season, concerns about the 49ers' running game loomed largely for San Francisco. The 49ers were able to sign running back Terry Kirby by the fifth week of the season, but star fullback William Floyd was still recovering from a devastating knee injury suffered the previous season. Also, the loss of cornerback Eric Davis to divisional rival Carolina was a concern. However, with 1995's number one defense and highest scoring offense, San Francisco was picked by many to win their sixth Super Bowl.

The 49ers started out the 1996 season fast with dominant wins over the New Orleans Saints (27–11) and St. Louis Rams (34–0); against the Rams the 49ers scored two safeties. In the first two games, the 49ers had zero turnovers, but they had yet to throw a touchdown pass. In week 4, the 49ers faced the upstart 2–0 Carolina Panthers. Although favored to win, a groin injury to Steve Young, inconsistent run defense, and an aggressive blitzing scheme by Carolina led to a convincing 23–7 victory for the Panthers. San Francisco netted only 48 yards rushing and was only 2-of-11 on third-down conversions during the contest, and the budding bitterness of the rivalry spilled into constant jawing between Panthers receivers and the Niners secondary, notably spats between Carolina receiver Willie Green and the Niners' Merton Hanks.

Despite Steve Young's absence, the 49ers were able to win 39–17 over the Falcons on three interceptions of Bobby Hebert and a team-record six field goals by Jeff Wilkins, then the Niners beat the Rams in St. Louis 28–11.

However, in week seven the 49ers faced the team that knocked them out of the playoffs the previous year: the Green Bay Packers. With Steve Young on the bench, the 49ers ran an aggressive offensive and defensive scheme, building a 17–6 lead in the second quarter. But from that point on, conservative play-calling allowed Green Bay to get back in the game. With the game tied at 17 late in the fourth quarter, the 49ers faced a third and short in Green Bay territory. George Seifert opted for quarterback Elvis Grbac to fall on the ball and settle for a lead-changing field goal. However, Brett Favre led the Packers to a tying field goal at the end of regulation, and the Packers were able to win the game in overtime. In hindsight, that game was the turning point for the 49ers' season.

In a comeback victory over Cincinnati, Steve Young left the game due to injury, but heroically returned to lead the 49ers back from a 21–0 deficit; Young threw two touchdowns (including the first caught by mercurial rookie Terrell Owens) and ran in a third. In Houston Young connected with Jerry Rice on a quick slant, but suffered a concussion on the play; adding insult to the injury, time was out on the play due to a defensive penalty, thus the play didn't count. However, with Young and primary backup Elvis Grbac out, the 49ers were able to pull off a close 10–9 victory with third-stringer Jeff Brohm. A week later, once again the 49ers won a close game, 24–17 over New Orleans. After jumping out to a quick 10–0 lead in the first quarter against the arch-rival Dallas Cowboys, Young was again injured and finished the game on the sidelines. With the 49ers offense stagnant, the Cowboys came back to win 20–17 in overtime. Mounting frustration over the team's struggles was perhaps best showcased by a comment from Mayor Willie Brown that Elvis Grbac (who'd thrown a key interception from his nine-yard line) was "an embarrassment to mankind" after the defeat.

However, the 49ers were able to rebound, winning three straight, over the Ravens, Washington, and the Falcons at Atlanta. With many of their stars returning from injury, including Young, William Floyd, and Brent Jones, some analysts believed that the 49ers were a team to be feared again. With a 10–3 record and a one-game lead in the division, San Francisco had a chance to clinch the divisional title against the Panthers. But it was the 49ers who appeared to be a second-year franchise, making costly mistakes and penalties. Despite the 49ers gaining more yards than they did in the previous game against the Panthers (450 yards), Carolina was able to win, 30–24. Once again the Panthers jumped out to an early lead, 17–7, and scored 27 points by halftime. Although San Francisco was able to hold them to only a field goal in the second half, the lead proved to be too much; Young also was picked off twice and sacked five times.

Humbled, San Francisco was able to regain their offensive composure, winning the following week in Pittsburgh 25–15, against the defending AFC champions who were in the hunt for the #2 seed in their conference. Then the 49ers easily won the regular season finale against 5–10 Detroit, earning the #4 seed and its one home-field playoff game. Steve Young's 17/23, 2 TD performance against Detroit earned him his 5th NFL passing title with a passer rating of 97.2, edging out season MVP Brett Favre.

=== Schedule ===
Week	Date	Opponent	Result	Record	Venue	Attendance
1	September 1	**New Orleans Saints**	**W** 27–11	1–0	3Com Park	63,970
2	September 8	**St. Louis Rams**	**W** 34–0	2–0	3Com Park	63,624
3	Bye					
4	September 22	at **Carolina Panthers**	**L** 7–23	2–1	Ericcson Stadium	72,224
5	September 29	**Atlanta Falcons**	**W** 39–17	3–1	3Com Park	62,995
6	October 6	at **St. Louis Rams**	**W** 28–11	4–1	Trans World Dome	61,260
7	October 14	at Green Bay Packers	**L** 20–23 (OT)	4–2	Lambeau Field	60,716
8	October 20	Cincinnati Bengals	**W** 28–21	5–2	3Com Park	63,218
9	October 27	at Houston Oilers	**W** 10–9	6–2	Houston Astrodome	53,664
10	November 3	at **New Orleans Saints**	**W** 24–17	7–2	Louisiana Superdome	53,297
11	November 10	Dallas Cowboys	**L** 17–20 (OT)	7–3	3Com Park	68,919
12	November 17	Baltimore Ravens	**W** 38–20	8–3	3Com Park	51,596
13	November 24	at Washington Redskins	**W** 19–16 (OT)	9–3	RFK Stadium	54,235
14	December 2	at **Atlanta Falcons**	**W** 34–10	10–3	Georgia Dome	46,318
15	December 8	**Carolina Panthers**	**L** 24–30	10–4	3Com Park	66,291
16	December 15	at Pittsburgh Steelers	**W** 25–15	11–4	Three Rivers Stadium	59,823
17	December 23	Detroit Lions	**W** 24–14	12–4	3Com Park	61,921
Note: Intra-division opponents are in **bold** text.

=== Standings ===
NFC West
	W	L	T	PCT	PF	PA	STK
^{(2)} Carolina Panthers	12	4	0	.750	367	218	W7
^{(4)} San Francisco 49ers	12	4	0	.750	398	257	W2
St. Louis Rams	6	10	0	.375	303	409	W2
Atlanta Falcons	3	13	0	.188	309	461	L2
New Orleans Saints	3	13	0	.188	229	339	L1

== Postseason ==
=== Schedule ===
Playoff Round	Date	Opponent (seed)	Result	Record	Game Site	NFL.com recap
Wild Card	December 29, 1996	Philadelphia Eagles (5)	W 14–0	1–0	3Com Park	
Divisional	January 4, 1997	at Green Bay Packers (1)	L 14–35	1–1	Lambeau Field	

=== Game summaries ===
==== NFC Wild Card Playoffs: vs. (5) Philadelphia Eagles ====
NFC Wild Card playoff: Philadelphia Eagles at San Francisco 49ers – Game summary

Quarter	1	2	3	4	Total
Eagles	0	0	0	0	0
49ers	0	7	7	0	14

at 3Com Park, San Francisco, California

- Date: December 29, 1996
- Game time: 1 p.m. PDT

Game information

First quarter

- No scoring plays

Second quarter

- SF – Steve Young 9 yard rush (Jeff Wilkins kick). 49ers 7–0

Third quarter

- SF – Jerry Rice 3 yard pass from Steve Young. 49ers 14–0

Fourth quarter

- No scoring plays

Eagles

- Ty Detmer. 14-21, 148 yards, 0 TD, 2 Int
- Ricky Watters. 20 rush, 57 yards

49ers

- Steve Young. 14-21, 161 yards, 1 TD, 0 Int. 11 rush, 61 yards, 1 TD
- Bryant Young. 2 sacks

Turnovers

- Eagles – 3
- 49ers – 0

The 49ers entered the playoffs as the 4th seed. Their wild card match-up against the Philadelphia Eagles featured the return of Ricky Watters to San Francisco. Many analysts believed that Watters's departure was one of the main reasons the 49ers' dominance declined, so the game was highly anticipated.

The weather was very rainy and windy, but Steve Young's passes were as accurate as they were during the season. Despite both offenses moving the ball well, neither was able to score until the second quarter. With the score tied at 0–0, a long pass from Young to Jerry Rice set up Young's scamper into the endzone for a touchdown on a draw play. Although the 49ers took a 7–0 lead into half time, Young was once again injured. At the beginning of the second half, Young's throws were visibly altered. However, pain killers were effective enough for him to throw a touchdown pass to Rice before the game was over. Unfortunately for San Francisco, Young broke his ribs on the touchdown run, and the injury would force him to leave early in the first quarter the following week.

Although Philadelphia was able to move the ball at times, the 49ers were able to keep them scoreless. San Francisco advanced to the divisional playoffs, and the opponent would again be the Green Bay Packers. This would be the 49ers last playoff win against the Eagles until 2025.

==== NFC Divisional Playoffs: at (1) Green Bay Packers ====
NFC Divisional Playoff: San Francisco 49ers vs. Green Bay Packers – Game summary

Quarter	1	2	3	4	Total
49ers	0	7	7	0	14
Packers	14	7	7	7	35

at Lambeau Field, Green Bay, Wisconsin

- Date: January 4, 1997
- Game time: 11:30 a.m

Game information

First quarter

- GB – Desmond Howard 71-yard punt return (Chris Jackie kick). Packers 7–0
- GB – Andre Rison 4-yard pass from Brett Favre (Chris Jackie kick). Packers 14–0

Second quarter

- GB – Edgar Bennett 2-yard rush (Chris Jackie kick). Packers 21–0
- SF – Terry Kirby 8-yard pass from Elvis Grbac (Jeff Wilkins kick). Packers 21–7

Third quarter

- SF – Elvis Grbac 2-yard rush (Jeff Wilkins kick). Packers 21–14
- GB – Antonio Freeman 0-yard fumble return (Chris Jackie kick). Packers 28–14

Fourth quarter

- GB – Edgar Bennett 11-yard rush (Chris Jackie kick). Packers 35–14

49ers

- Steve Young. 2-5, 8 yards
- Elvis Grbac. 19-36 125 yards, 1 TD, 3 int

Packers

- Brett Favre. 11-15, 79 yards, 1 TD, 0 int
- Edgar Bennett. 17 rush, 80 yards, 2 TD

Turnovers

- 49ers – 5
- Packers – 1

San Francisco fell behind 21–0 early, but battled back to 21–14 part way through the third quarter. Special teams were decisively dominated by the Packers. To make matters worse, Steve Young only played for a few ineffective plays due to his rib injury. Neither team's offense was particularly effective in the game, with San Francisco gaining 196 total yards and Green Bay gaining 210 (including only 79 passing yards). However, costly penalties by San Francisco (6 for 42 yards, while Green Bay only had 1 for 5) and outstanding play by the Packers' special teams were the deciding factors (Green Bay averaged 43.2 yards per punt return).

A muffed kickoff by Green Bay set up a 49ers touchdown, but Green Bay's Desmond Howard returned two kicks for large gains, including one touchdown. The final score was Green Bay, 35–14. With the 49ers most valuable player out, special teams errors were far too much for San Francisco to remain competitive in the game. Green Bay was the eventual Super Bowl champion, and the 49ers' season again ended in defeat against the Packers.

== Awards and records ==
- Jerry Rice, Led NFL, Receptions, 108 receptions
- Jeff Wilkins, Franchise Record (tied), Most Field Goals in One Game, 6 Field Goals (September 29, 1996)
- Steve Young, Led NFL, Passer Rating, 97.2 Rating
