= Randall Godfrey =

American football player (born 1973)

No. 56, 53, 58, 57
- Position: Linebacker

Personal information
- Born: April 6, 1973 (age 53); Valdosta, Georgia, U.S.
- Listed height: 6 ft 2 in (1.88 m)
- Listed weight: 245 lb (111 kg)

Career information
- High school: Lowndes (Valdosta)
- College: Georgia
- NFL draft: 1996: 2nd round, 49th overall pick

Career history
- Dallas Cowboys (1996–1999); Tennessee Titans (2000–2002); Seattle Seahawks (2003); San Diego Chargers (2004–2006); Washington Redskins (2007)

Awards and highlights
- Second-team All-Pro (2000); First-team All-SEC (1993); Second-team All-SEC (1994); Freshman All-American (1992); SEC Freshman of the Year (1992); Freshman All-SEC (1992)

Career NFL statistics
- Tackles: 850
- Sacks: 17
- Forced fumbles: 19
- Passes defended: 29
- Interceptions: 6
- Defensive touchdowns: 2
- Stats at Pro Football Reference

Randall Euralentris Godfrey (born April 6, 1973) is an American former professional football player who was a linebacker in the National Football League (NFL). Godfrey played college football for the Georgia Bulldogs football and was selected in the 1996 NFL draft by the Dallas Cowboys with the 49th overall pick. He then played for the Tennessee Titans and the Seattle Seahawks.

== Early life ==
Godfrey attended Lowndes High School in Valdosta, Georgia, where he was a three-sport athlete (football, basketball and track). As a senior, he finished with 111 tackles, 6 sacks and 2 interceptions, receiving All-American, All-State and All-South honors.

He accepted a scholarship from the University of Georgia, where he majored in housing and consumer economics. He became the first true freshman in school history to lead the team in tackles (114) and was also named SEC Freshman of the Year. The next year, he repeated as the team leader in tackles (114) and earned All-SEC honors.

As a junior, he registered 102 tackles (second on the team), 2 sacks and 5 passes defensed. In his last year he missed four games with a pulled hamstring, affecting his playing time and finishing with 35 tackles (3 for loss).

== Professional career ==
=== Dallas Cowboys ===
Godfrey was selected by the Dallas Cowboys in the second round of the 1996 NFL draft, after dropping because of his diminished production as a college senior. Although he was selected to play middle linebacker, the level of skill and speed he demonstrated in training camp, allowed the Cowboys to move him into different defensive positions.

He started the last six games of his rookie season at strongside linebacker replacing Broderick Thomas. The next year, he registered 149 tackles (second on the team), one sack and 2 passes defensed. In 1998, he finished with 115 tackles (fourth on the team), 3 sacks and 3 forced fumbles.

In 1999, he led the team with 143 tackles after being switched to his natural position at middle linebacker, replacing Fred Strickland who was released.

In the 90's, the Cowboys organization felt they could find linebackers through the draft, without the need of paying a premium and adversely impacting the salary cap, so they allowed talented and productive players like Ken Norton Jr., Darrin Smith, Dixon Edwards and Robert Jones, to leave via free agency, instead of signing them into long-term contracts.

During the 2000 free agency period, although Godfrey was firmly entrenched as the team starting middle linebacker, the Cowboys chose not to match the offer he received from the Tennessee Titans and decided to let Dat Nguyen take over the position. He never missed a game in his four seasons in Dallas, recording 438 tackles, 5 quarterback sacks and 2 interceptions.

=== Tennessee Titans ===
In 2000, he set a career-high with 169 tackles and was named second-team All-Pro. He also registered 3 sacks, 6 passes defensed, 2 fumble recoveries and 2 interceptions.

Godfrey led the Titans in tackles each of his first two seasons with the team. Because of a right ankle injury he suffered in the season opener, he only played in 8 games (5 starts) during the 2002 season, finishing with 44 tackles and a sack.

Even though the Titans reworked his contract, with him agreeing to take less money, the team released him for salary cap reasons at the start of training camp in 2003.

=== Seattle Seahawks ===
Godfrey signed a one-year contract with the Seattle Seahawks, where he started 14 games and had 59 tackles in 2003.

=== San Diego Chargers ===
The San Diego Chargers signed Godfrey to a three-year deal in 2004. He was released after the 2007 NFL draft.

=== Washington Redskins ===
On August 21, 2007, Washington Redskins coach Joe Gibbs, seeking to rebuild an injury-riddled linebacking corps, talked Godfrey out of retirement. He was not re-signed after the season and retired.

On October 28, 2007, Godfrey made critical remarks regarding New England Patriots head coach Bill Belichick. Following a game in which the Patriots defeated the Redskins 52–7, Godfrey accused Belichick of showing the Redskins "no respect" because the Patriots continued to call deep passing plays despite leading 38-0 entering the fourth quarter. Belichick defended his play calling, saying "When you're playing defense it's your job to stop them. It's not (the offense's) job to not score."

== NFL career statistics ==
Legend
| | Led the league |
| **Bold** | Career high |

=== Regular season ===
| Year | Team | Games | | Tackles | | | | Interceptions | | | | Fumbles | | | |
| Year | Team | GP | GS | Comb | Solo | Ast | Sck | Int | Yds | TD | Lng | FF | FR | Yds | TD |
|---|---|---|---|---|---|---|---|---|---|---|---|---|---|---|---|
| 1996 | DAL | 16 | 6 | 28 | 25 | 3 | 0.0 | 0 | 0 | 0 | 0 | 1 | 0 | 0 | 0 |
| 1997 | DAL | 16 | 16 | 97 | 66 | **31** | 1.0 | 0 | 0 | 0 | 0 | 0 | 1 | 0 | 0 |
| 1998 | DAL | 16 | 16 | 86 | 70 | 16 | 3.0 | 1 | 0 | 0 | 0 | 2 | 1 | 0 | 0 |
| 1999 | DAL | 16 | 16 | 98 | 83 | 15 | 1.0 | 1 | 10 | 0 | 10 | 1 | 0 | 0 | 0 |
| 2000 | TEN | 16 | 16 | **121** | **98** | 23 | 3.0 | **2** | **25** | **1** | **24** | **5** | 1 | 0 | 0 |
| 2001 | TEN | 14 | 14 | 78 | 62 | 16 | 1.0 | 1 | 5 | 0 | 5 | 1 | 0 | 0 | 0 |
| 2002 | TEN | 8 | 5 | 32 | 25 | 7 | 1.0 | 0 | 0 | 0 | 0 | 0 | 0 | 0 | 0 |
| 2003 | SEA | 15 | 14 | 59 | 45 | 14 | 0.0 | 1 | 7 | 0 | 7 | 1 | 1 | **55** | **1** |
| 2004 | SDG | 15 | 15 | 87 | 68 | 19 | 2.0 | 0 | 0 | 0 | 0 | 3 | 1 | 0 | 0 |
| 2005 | SDG | 14 | 14 | 77 | 56 | 21 | 1.0 | 0 | 0 | 0 | 0 | 1 | **4** | 35 | 0 |
| 2006 | SDG | 13 | 13 | 58 | 42 | 16 | **4.0** | 0 | 0 | 0 | 0 | 2 | 0 | 0 | 0 |
| 2007 | WAS | 11 | 4 | 29 | 21 | 8 | 0.0 | 0 | 0 | 0 | 0 | 2 | 0 | 0 | 0 |
| | | 170 | 149 | 850 | 661 | 189 | 17.0 | 6 | 47 | 1 | 24 | 19 | 9 | 90 | 1 |

=== Playoffs ===
| Year | Team | Games | | Tackles | | | | Interceptions | | | | Fumbles | | | |
| Year | Team | GP | GS | Comb | Solo | Ast | Sck | Int | Yds | TD | Lng | FF | FR | Yds | TD |
|---|---|---|---|---|---|---|---|---|---|---|---|---|---|---|---|
| 1996 | DAL | 1 | 1 | 1 | 1 | 0 | 0.0 | 0 | 0 | 0 | 0 | 0 | 0 | 0 | 0 |
| 1998 | DAL | 1 | 1 | 2 | 2 | 0 | 0.0 | 0 | 0 | 0 | 0 | 0 | 0 | 0 | 0 |
| 1999 | DAL | 1 | 1 | 8 | **7** | 1 | 0.0 | 0 | 0 | 0 | 0 | 0 | 0 | 0 | 0 |
| 2000 | TEN | 1 | 1 | **9** | **7** | **2** | **1.0** | 0 | 0 | 0 | 0 | 0 | 0 | 0 | 0 |
| 2002 | TEN | 2 | 1 | 8 | 6 | **2** | 0.0 | 0 | 0 | 0 | 0 | 0 | 0 | 0 | 0 |
| 2003 | SEA | 1 | 1 | 5 | 4 | 1 | 0.0 | 0 | 0 | 0 | 0 | 0 | 0 | 0 | 0 |
| 2004 | SDG | 1 | 1 | 0 | 0 | 0 | 0.0 | 0 | 0 | 0 | 0 | 0 | 0 | 0 | 0 |
| 2006 | SDG | 1 | 1 | 0 | 0 | 0 | 0.0 | 0 | 0 | 0 | 0 | 0 | 0 | 0 | 0 |
| 2007 | WAS | 1 | 1 | 4 | 3 | 1 | 0.0 | 0 | 0 | 0 | 0 | 0 | 0 | 0 | 0 |
| | | 10 | 9 | 37 | 30 | 7 | 1.0 | 0 | 0 | 0 | 0 | 0 | 0 | 0 | 0 |

== Personal life ==
His son, R.J., plays basketball for Clemson University. He previously played for the University of Georgia.
