= Ray Zellars =

American football player (born 1973)

No. 34
- Position: Fullback

Personal information
- Born: March 25, 1973 (age 53); Pittsburgh, Pennsylvania, U.S.
- Listed height: 5 ft 11 in (1.80 m)
- Listed weight: 233 lb (106 kg)

Career information
- High school: David B. Oliver (Pittsburgh)
- College: Notre Dame
- NFL draft: 1995: 2nd round, 44th overall pick

Career history
- New Orleans Saints (1995–1998); Cincinnati Bengals (1998); Oakland Raiders (1999)*; Washington Redskins (2000)*
- * Offseason or practice squad member only

Career NFL statistics
- Rushing yards: 1,351
- Rushing average: 3.5
- Receptions: 57
- Receiving yards: 391
- Total touchdowns: 11
- Stats at Pro Football Reference

Raymond Mark Zellars (born March 25, 1973) is an American former professional football player who was a fullback in the National Football League (NFL). He played college football for the Notre Dame Fighting Irish and was selected by the New Orleans Saints in the second round of the 1995 NFL draft with the 44th overall pick. Zellars played for the Saints from 1995 to 1998, appearing in 48 regular-season games with 1,351 rushing yards and 11 touchdowns.

== Early life ==
Zellars was born in Pittsburgh, Pennsylvania, and attended David B. Oliver High School in Pittsburgh.

== College career ==
Zellars played college football at Notre Dame from 1991 to 1994. Sports Reference lists him with 210 rushing attempts for 1,135 yards and nine rushing touchdowns in his Notre Dame career.

One of Zellars' best-known college plays came against Purdue in 1994, when he scored on a 62-yard run during Notre Dame's 39–21 win at Notre Dame Stadium. Notre Dame later featured the play as part of its 125 Years of Notre Dame Football series.

== Professional career ==
The New Orleans Saints selected Zellars in the second round of the 1995 NFL draft, 44th overall. He played four seasons for New Orleans from 1995 to 1998.

Zellars appeared in 48 NFL regular-season games, including 29 starts. He finished his career with 382 rushing attempts for 1,351 yards and 11 touchdowns, along with 57 receptions for 391 yards. His most productive season came in 1997, when he started all 16 games and had 552 rushing yards, 263 receiving yards and four rushing touchdowns.

Zellars later had transactions with the Cincinnati Bengals, Oakland Raiders and Washington Redskins, but he did not appear in regular-season games for those teams.

== NFL career statistics ==
Legend
**Bold**	Career high

Year	Team	Games		Rushing					Receiving				
Year	Team	GP	GS	Att	Yds	Avg	Lng	TD	Rec	Yds	Avg	Lng	TD
1995	NOR	12	0	50	162	3.2	11	2	7	33	4.7	9	0
1996	NOR	9	6	120	475	**4.0**	**63**	**4**	9	45	5.0	12	0
1997	NOR	**16**	**16**	**156**	**552**	3.5	27	**4**	**31**	**263**	**8.5**	**38**	0
1998	NOR	11	7	56	162	2.9	15	1	10	50	5.0	14	0
Career		48	29	382	1,351	3.5	63	11	57	391	6.9	38	0
