= Jack Salmon =

Jack Salmon may refer to:

- Jack salmon, a common alternative name for the North Pacific hake.
- Jack salmon, a sexually mature male salmon that returns to spawn early.
- Jack Salmon, an American baseball player.
