= 1995 New Orleans Saints season =

29th season in franchise history

- Owner: Tom Benson
- General manager: Bill Kuharich
- Head coach: Jim Mora
- Offensive coordinator: Carl Smith
- Defensive coordinator: Monte Kiffin
- Home stadium: Louisiana Superdome

Results
- Record: 7–9
- Division place: 5th NFC West
- Playoffs: Did not qualify
- Pro Bowlers: T Willie Roaf; CB Eric Allen

The 1995 season was the New Orleans Saints' 29th season in the National Football League (NFL), the 21st to host games at the Louisiana Superdome and the tenth under head coach Jim Mora. The team matched on their 7–9 record from 1994, but missed the postseason for a third consecutive season and ended up in last place in the division for the first time since 1986.

== Offseason ==
=== NFL draft ===
1995 New Orleans Saints draft
Round	Pick	Player	Position	College	Notes
1	13	Mark Fields *	Linebacker	Washington State	
2	44	Ray Zellars	Running back	Notre Dame	
3	75	Mike Verstegen	Guard	Wisconsin	
4	108	Dameian Jeffries	Defensive end	Alabama	
5	148	William Strong	Defensive back	North Carolina State	
6	184	Lee DeRamus	Wide receiver	Wisconsin	
7	242	Travis Davis	Defensive back	Notre Dame	
Made roster * Made at least one Pro Bowl during career

== Personnel ==
1995 New Orleans Saints staff
Front office: Owner/general partner – Tom Benson; Executive vice-president of administration – Jim Miller; Vice-president of football operations – Bill Kuharich; Director of pro personnel – Chet Franklin; Director of college scouting – Bruce Lemmerman; Head coaches: Vice-president/head coach – Jim E. Mora; Offensive coaches: Offensive coordinator/quarterbacks – Carl Smith; Running backs – Jim Skipper; Wide receivers – Steve Walters; Tight ends – Larry Kennan; Offensive line – John Matsko	Defensive coaches: Defensive coordinator – Monte Kiffin; Defensive line – Wayne Nunnely; Linebackers – Jim Haslett; Defensive backs – Jim L. Mora; Defensive assistant – Steve Trimble; Defensive assistant – Frank Warren; Special teams coaches: Special teams – Joe Marciano; Strength and conditioning: Strength and conditioning – Russell Paternostro

== Roster ==
1995 New Orleans Saints roster
Quarterbacks (QB): 11 Jim Everett; 14 Tommy Hodson; 13 Doug Nussmeier; Running backs (RB): 24 Mario Bates; 20 Derek Brown; 22 Lorenzo Neal; 36 Derrick Ned; 34 Ray Zellars FB; Wide receivers (WR): 87 Lee DeRamus; 89 Quinn Early; 81 Michael Haynes; 84 Steve Rhem; 83 Torrance Small; Tight ends (TE): 86 Kirk Botkin LS; 82 Irv Smith; 85 Wesley Walls	Offensive linemen (OL): 71 Richard Cooper T; 72 Jim Dombrowski G; 61 Ed King G; 68 Alan Kline T; 67 Andy McCollum G; 60 Craig Novitsky; 77 Willie Roaf T; 62 Jeff Uhlenhake; 66 Mike Verstegen G/T; 63 Donald Willis G; Defensive linemen (DL): 99 Willie Broughton DT; 79 Tory Epps DT; 91 Robert Goff DT; 96 Dameian Jeffries DE; 94 Joe Johnson DE; 93 Wayne Martin DT; 74 Toddrick McIntosh DE; 90 Israel Stanley DT; 97 Renaldo Turnbull DE	Linebackers (LB): 51 Ron Childs MLB; 56 Ernest Dixon OLB; 55 Mark Fields OLB; 52 Richard Harvey OLB; 56 Brian Jones MLB; 59 Rufus Porter OLB; Defensive backs (DB): 21 Eric Allen CB; 45 Israel Byrd CB; 39 John Covington FS; 33 Tyrone Hughes; 43 Tyrone Legette CB; 46 Sean Lumpkin SS; 44 J. J. McCleskey FS; 30 Anthony Newman SS; 37 Jimmy Spencer CB; 41 William Strong CB; Special teams (ST): 10 Doug Brien K; 4 Klaus Wilmsmeyer P	Practice squad: 98 Dunstan Anderson DE; 95 Ernest Jones DE; Reserve: 26 Vince Buck S (IR); 28 Ralph Dawkins RB (IR); 35 Shane Pahukoa S (IR); 70 Chris Port G/T (IR); 3 Timm Rosenbach QB (NF-Inj.); 54 Winfred Tubbs LB (IR); 53 active, 6 inactive, 2 practice squad Rookies in italics

== Regular season ==
=== Schedule ===
Week	Date	Opponent	Result	Record	Venue	Attendance
1	September 3	San Francisco 49ers	**L** 22–24	0–1	Louisiana Superdome	66,627
2	September 10	at **St. Louis Rams**	**L** 13–17	0–2	Busch Memorial Stadium	59,335
3	September 17	**Atlanta Falcons**	**L** 24–27 (OT)	0–3	Louisiana Superdome	57,442
4	September 24	at New York Giants	**L** 29–45	0–4	Giants Stadium	72,619
5	October 1	Philadelphia Eagles	**L** 10–15	0–5	Louisiana Superdome	43,938
6	Bye					
7	October 15	Miami Dolphins	**W** 33–30	1–5	Louisiana Superdome	55,628
8	October 22	at **Carolina Panthers**	**L** 3–20	1–6	Memorial Stadium	55,484
9	October 29	at **San Francisco 49ers**	**W** 11–7	2–6	3Com Park	65,272
10	November 5	**St. Louis Rams**	**W** 19–10	3–6	Louisiana Superdome	43,120
11	November 12	Indianapolis Colts	**W** 17–14	4–6	Louisiana Superdome	44,122
12	November 19	at Minnesota Vikings	**L** 24–43	4–7	Hubert H. Humphrey Metrodome	58,108
13	November 26	Carolina Panthers	**W** 34–26	5–7	Louisiana Superdome	39,580
14	December 3	at New England Patriots	**W** 31–17	6–7	Foxboro Stadium	59,876
15	December 10	at Atlanta Falcons	**L** 14–19	6–8	Georgia Dome	54,603
16	December 16	Green Bay Packers	**L** 23–34	6–9	Louisiana Superdome	50,132
17	December 24	at New York Jets	**W** 12–0	7–9	Giants Stadium	28,885
Note: Intra-division opponents are in **bold** text.

== Game summaries ==
=== Week 1: vs San Francisco 49ers ===
Week 1: San Francisco 49ers at New Orleans Saints – Game summary

Quarter	1	2	3	4	Total
49ers	0	17	7	0	24
Saints	0	9	6	7	22

at Louisiana Superdome, New Orleans, Louisiana

- Date: September 3
- Game time: 12:00 p.m. CDT
- Game weather: None (indoor stadium)
- Game attendance: 66,627
- Recap

With the loss, the Saints started 0–1.

=== Week 2: at St. Louis Rams ===
Week 2: New Orleans Saints at St. Louis Rams – Game summary

Quarter	1	2	3	4	Total
Saints	3	0	7	3	13
Rams	7	10	0	0	17

at Busch Stadium, St. Louis

- Date: September 10
- Game time: 12:00 p.m. CDT
- Game weather: Sunny
- Game attendance: 59,335
- Recap

With the loss, the Saints fell to 0–2.

=== Standings ===
NFC West
	W	L	T	PCT	PF	PA	STK
^{(2)} San Francisco 49ers	11	5	0	.688	457	258	L1
^{(6)} Atlanta Falcons	9	7	0	.563	362	349	W1
St. Louis Rams	7	9	0	.438	309	418	L3
Carolina Panthers	7	9	0	.438	289	325	L1
New Orleans Saints	7	9	0	.438	319	348	W1

== Awards and records ==
- Jim Everett, franchise record, most passing yards in one season, 3,970 yards
- Jim Everett, franchise record, most touchdown passes in one season, 26 touchdown passes
