= Mike Salmon =

Mike Salmon may refer to:

- Mike Salmon (footballer)
- Mike Salmon (American football)
- Mike Salmon (racing driver)
