= Marcus Holliday =

American football player (born 1973)

No. 36
- Position: Running back

Personal information
- Born: July 16, 1973 (age 53); Memphis, Tennessee, U.S.
- Listed height: 5 ft 11 in (1.80 m)
- Listed weight: 222 lb (101 kg)

Career information
- High school: Fairley (Memphis)
- College: Memphis
- NFL draft: 1995: undrafted

Career history
- St. Louis Rams (1996); Hamilton Tiger-Cats (1997)

Career NFL statistics
- Games played: 1
- Stats at Pro Football Reference

Marcus Edward "Doc" Holliday (born July 16, 1973) is an American former professional football player who was a running back for the St. Louis Rams of the National Football League (NFL) and the Hamilton Tiger-Cats of the Canadian Football League (CFL). He played college football for the Memphis Tigers.

== College career ==
Holliday, who grew up in Memphis, was a fan of the Memphis Tigers men's basketball program and decided to commit to the University of Memphis for that reason, choosing it over Ole Miss, Northern Illinois, Arkansas, Arkansas State, and Tennessee. While at Memphis, he was friends with several basketball players and future NBA stars, including Penny Hardaway and David Vaughn.

Holliday played for the Memphis Tigers football team from 1991 to 1994. In 1994, he was the school's rushing leader with 618 yards and three touchdowns that year. He also played in the 1994 Blue–Gray Game.

During a 13–0 shutout win against Tulane in 1994, Holliday set the Memphis record for most rushing attempts in a single game with 42, gaining 151 yards in the process. The record still stands as of 2021.

=== College statistics ===
Year	Games	Rushing				Receiving				All-purpose			
Year	Games	Att	Yds	Avg	TD	Rec	Yds	Avg	TD	Plays	Yds	Avg	TD
1991	3	56	251	4.5	2	–	–	–	–	56	251	4.5	2
1992	10	49	189	3.9	3	6	52	8.7	0	55	241	4.4	3
1993	8	52	217	4.2	1	3	44	14.7	0	55	261	4.7	1
1994	8	145	618	4.3	3	3	20	6.7	0	148	638	4.3	3
Career	29	302	1,275	4.2	9	12	116	9.7	0	314	1,391	4.4	9

== Professional career ==
=== St. Louis Rams ===
On July 24, 1996, Holliday signed with the St. Louis Rams as a free agent. There, he was reunited with former Memphis teammate Isaac Bruce. He was waived by the Rams on August 19.

The Rams re-signed Holliday on November 30, 1996. The following day, he played in his only NFL game, a 26–10 win over the New Orleans Saints on December 1. He was released by the team on December 3 but was then signed back to the practice squad the following day.

=== Hamilton Tiger-Cats ===
Holliday played with the Hamilton Tiger-Cats in 1997, starting one game with the team. He made two rushing attempts and two receptions for seven yards in each category.

== After football ==
Holliday was formerly the sports director at ABC affiliate news station WATN-TV. He now serves as the Director of Broadcast Operations at Rust College.

He also hosts a podcast called Bleav in Rams with his former teammate Isaac Bruce.

== Personal life ==
Holliday and his wife Yatasha have four children: sons Marcus Holliday II and Jalen Kellum, and daughters Marchana and McKenzie. Marcus II played running back for the Murray State Racers and the Lane Dragons.

In 2009, he was held at gunpoint by a 16-year-old student on the high school football team he was coaching.
