= 1996 Atlanta Falcons season =

NFL team season

- Owner: Rankin Smith
- Head coach: June Jones
- Home stadium: Georgia Dome

Results
- Record: 3–13
- Division place: 4th NFC West
- Playoffs: Did not qualify
- Pro Bowlers: None

The 1996 Atlanta Falcons season was the franchise’s 31st season in the National Football League (NFL). The Falcons were unable to match their previous season’s output of 9–7 and failed to reach the playoffs. Atlanta started the season 0–8, going winless until November. Two of the team’s three wins were over the equally inept New Orleans Saints, who also finished 3–13.

The Falcons allowed 461 points in 1996, the most in team history. Football Outsiders calculates that the 1996 Falcons had the third-worst pass defense they had ever tracked.

The season was notable when Jeff George was engaged in a shouting match with June Jones in a nationally televised game against Philadelphia. The next day, George was suspended for his act and was eventually released by the team. As for coach Jones, he was fired at the conclusion of the season. This was also the final season Bobby Hebert would play in the NFL.

== Offseason ==
=== NFL draft ===
1996 Atlanta Falcons draft
Round	Pick	Player	Position	College	Notes
3	84	Shannon Brown	Defensive tackle	Alabama	
4	117	Richard Huntley	Running back	Winston-Salem State	
4	127	Juran Bolden	Cornerback	Mississippi Delta	
5	164	Gary Bandy	Defensive end	Baylor	
6	188	Craig Sauer	Linebacker	Minnesota	
7	229	Ethan Brooks	Offensive tackle	Williams	
Made roster

== Personnel ==
1996 Atlanta Falcons staff
Front office: Chairman of the Board – Rankin M. Smith Sr.; President – Taylor Smith; Vice President of Player Personnel – Ken Herock; Director of Pro Personnel – Chuck Connor; Head coaches: Head Coach – June Jones; Offensive coaches: Assistant Head Coach/Wide Receivers – Milt Jackson; Quarterbacks – Mouse Davis; Running Backs – Ollie Wilson; Offensive Line – Bob Palcic	Defensive coaches: Assistant Head Coach/Defense – Rod Rust; Defensive Line – Bill Kollar; Linebackers – Joe Haering; Secondary – Keith Armstrong; Defensive Assistant – Will Lewis; Special teams coaches: Assistant Head Coach/Special Teams – Frank Gansz; Strength and conditioning: Strength and Conditioning – Tim Jorgensen

== Roster ==
1996 Atlanta Falcons roster
Quarterbacks (QB): 3 Bobby Hebert; 7 Browning Nagle; 11 Billy Joe Tolliver; Running backs (RB): 32 Jamal Anderson; 34 Craig Heyward; 33 Richard Huntley; Wide receivers (WR): 80 Tyrone Brown; 87 Bert Emanuel; 81 Terance Mathis; 21 Eric Metcalf; 85 Roell Preston; 84 Freddie Scott; Tight ends (TE): 88 Harper LeBel LS; 86 Mitch Lyons	Offensive linemen (OL): 76 Antone Davis T; 65 Roman Fortin C; 63 Keith Loneker G; 55 Nate Miller G; 64 Jeff Pahukoa G; 61 Robbie Tobeck G; 70 Bob Whitfield T; 69 Gene Williams G; 77 Matt Willig T; 72 Mike Zandofsky G; Defensive linemen (DL): 92 Lester Archambeau DE; 73 Ethan Brooks DT; 91 John Burrough DE; 67 Moe Gardner DT; 98 Travis Hall DT; 96 Todd Kelly DE; 93 Dan Owens DT; 90 Chuck Smith DE; 74 Jeff Zgonina DT	Linebackers (LB): 97 Cornelius Bennett OLB; 51 David Brandon OLB; 56 Scott Fields OLB; 50 Ron George OLB; 57 Clay Matthews OLB; 52 Craig Sauer OLB; 59 Lorenzo Styles MLB; 58 Jessie Tuggle MLB; Defensive backs (DB): 24 Patrick Bates FS; 42 Sean Boyd CB; 25 Devin Bush SS; 27 Brad Edwards FS; 28 Lenny McGill CB; 38 Nate Odomes CB; 26 Anthony Phillips CB; 29 Louis Riddick SS; 37 Elbert Shelley CB/S; 45 Darnell Walker CB; Special teams (ST): 5 Morten Andersen K; 4 Dan Stryzinski P	Practice squad: 30 Robert Baldwin RB; 78 Clay Williams T; Reserve: 89 J. J. Birden WR (IR); 43 Juran Bolden CB (IR); 75 Shannon Brown DE (IR); 22 Tim McKyer CB (IR); 40 James Williams LB (IR); 53 active, 5 inactive, 2 practice squad Rookies in italics

== Regular season ==
=== Schedule ===
Week	Date	Opponent	Result	Record	Venue	Recap
1	September 1	at **Carolina Panthers**	**L** 6–29	0–1	Ericsson Stadium	Recap
2	September 8	Minnesota Vikings	**L** 17–23	0–2	Georgia Dome	Recap
3	Bye					
4	September 22	Philadelphia Eagles	**L** 18–33	0–3	Georgia Dome	Recap
5	September 29	at **San Francisco 49ers**	**L** 17–39	0–4	3Com Park	Recap
6	October 6	at Detroit Lions	**L** 24–28	0–5	Pontiac Silverdome	Recap
7	October 13	Houston Oilers	**L** 13–23	0–6	Georgia Dome	Recap
8	October 20	at Dallas Cowboys	**L** 28–32	0–7	Texas Stadium	Recap
9	October 27	Pittsburgh Steelers	**L** 17–20	0–8	Georgia Dome	Recap
10	November 3	**Carolina Panthers**	**W** 20–17	1–8	Georgia Dome	Recap
11	November 10	at **St. Louis Rams**	**L** 16–59	1–9	Trans World Dome	Recap
12	November 17	**New Orleans Saints**	**W** 17–15	2–9	Georgia Dome	Recap
13	November 24	at Cincinnati Bengals	**L** 31–41	2–10	Cinergy Field	Recap
14	December 2	**San Francisco 49ers**	**L** 10–34	2–11	Georgia Dome	Recap
15	December 8	at **New Orleans Saints**	**W** 31–15	3–11	Louisiana Superdome	Recap
16	December 15	**St. Louis Rams**	**L** 27–34	3–12	Georgia Dome	Recap
17	December 22	at Jacksonville Jaguars	**L** 17–19	3–13	Jacksonville Municipal Stadium	Recap
Note: Intra-division opponents are in **bold** text.

=== Standings ===
NFC West
	W	L	T	PCT	PF	PA	STK
^{(2)} Carolina Panthers	12	4	0	.750	367	218	W7
^{(4)} San Francisco 49ers	12	4	0	.750	398	257	W2
St. Louis Rams	6	10	0	.375	303	409	W2
Atlanta Falcons	3	13	0	.188	309	461	L2
New Orleans Saints	3	13	0	.188	229	339	L1
