= 1996 Dallas Cowboys season =

NFL team season

- Owner: Jerry Jones
- General manager: Jerry Jones
- Head coach: Barry Switzer
- Offensive coordinator: Ernie Zampese
- Defensive coordinator: Dave Campo
- Home stadium: Texas Stadium

Results
- Record: 10–6
- Division place: 1st NFC East
- Playoffs: Won Wild Card Playoffs (vs. Vikings) 40–15; Lost Divisional Playoffs (at Panthers) 17–26
- Pro Bowlers: QB Troy Aikman; CB Deion Sanders; S Darren Woodson; OG Larry Allen; OG Nate Newton; OT Erik Williams; C Ray Donaldson; DE Tony Tolbert; ST Jim Schwantz

Uniform
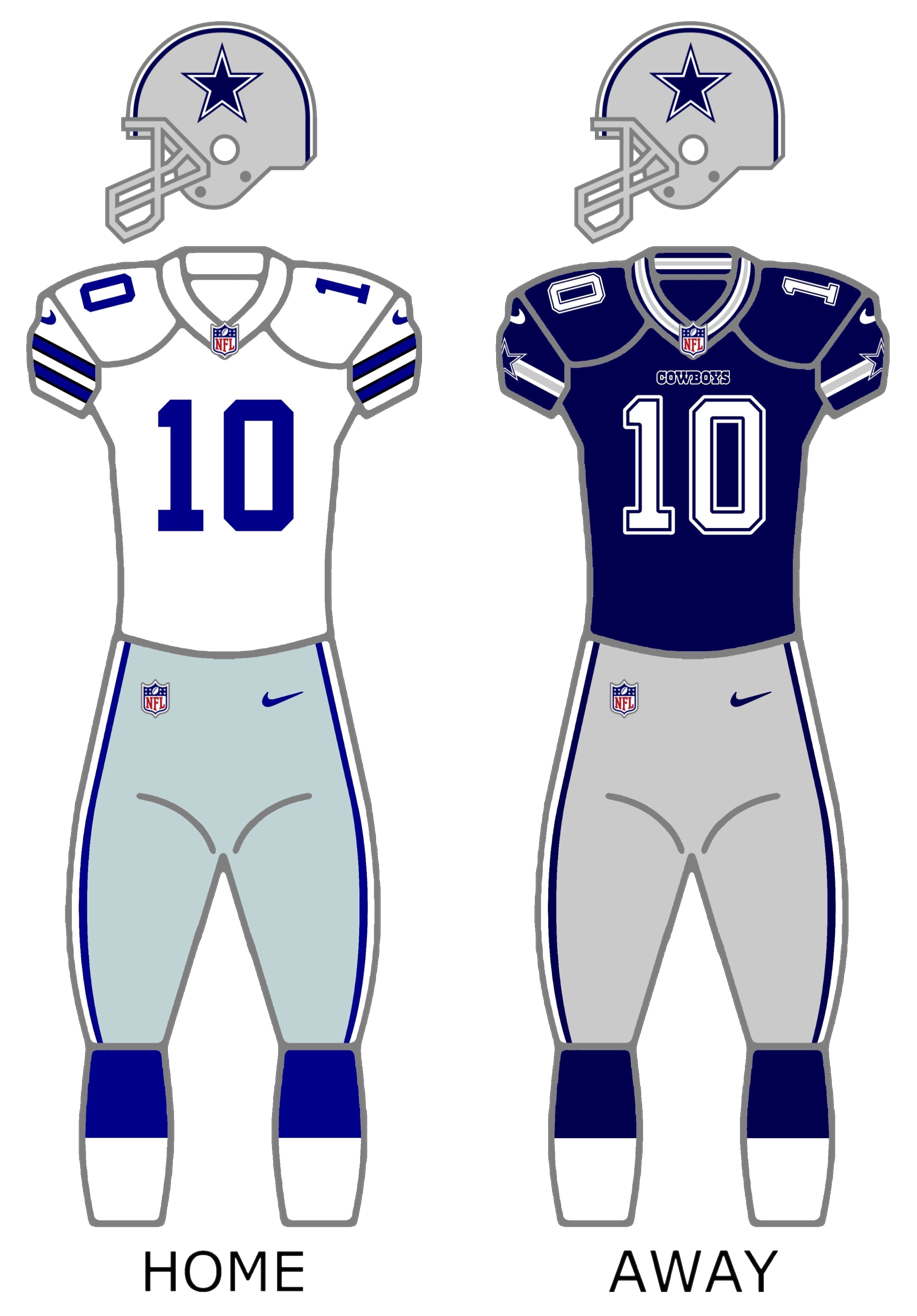

The 1996 Dallas Cowboys season was the franchise's 37th season in the National Football League (NFL) and was the third year under head coach Barry Switzer. Following their victory in Super Bowl XXX, the Cowboys failed to improve on their 12–4 record from 1995 but still reached the playoffs with a 10–6 record. Star receiver Michael Irvin was suspended by the league for the first five games and before the playoffs was accused along with offensive tackle Erik Williams of sexual assault. Controversy also took place when writer Skip Bayless published a scathing account of the Cowboys' 1995 season. Longtime trainer Mike Woicik also left the team after the season following a sideline dispute with coach Barry Switzer although Woicik returned in 2011. Additionally, late in the season; defensive tackle Leon Lett would be suspended for the last 3 games of the season and the first 13 of the following season after violating the NFL's substance abuse policy.

The Cowboys blew out the Vikings 40–15 in the Wild Card Round before being upset by the Panthers 26–17 in the Divisional Round. This shocking loss would kick off a long stretch of playoff futility for the Cowboys. The Cowboys failed to win another playoff game until 2009, and since their Super Bowl win the previous season, the Cowboys have never made it past the divisional round as of 2025.

This would be Troy Aikman’s final season with a playoff win.

== Offseason ==
=== NFL draft ===
1996 Dallas Cowboys draft
Round	Pick	Player	Position	College	Notes
2	37	Kavika Pittman	Defensive end	McNeese State	
2	49	Randall Godfrey	Linebacker	Georgia	
3	67	Clay Shiver	Center	Florida State	
3	94	Stepfret Williams	Wide receiver	Louisiana–Monroe	
3	95	Mike Ulufale	Defensive end	BYU	
5	157	Kenneth McDaniel	Defensive back	Norfolk State	
5	167	Alan Campos	Linebacker	Louisville	
6	207	Wendell Davis	Cornerback	Oklahoma	
7	243	Ryan Wood	Running back	Arizona State	
Made roster † Pro Football Hall of Fame * Made at least one Pro Bowl during career

== Regular season ==
Against the Chicago Bears in week one, running back Emmitt Smith left the game late with an injury that left him temporarily paralyzed. Though not career-threatening, Smith's injury hampered his effectiveness for the duration of the season. Adding to their difficulties, star wide receiver Michael Irvin was suspended for the first five games due to his highly publicized off-season incidents. Star cornerback Deion Sanders became the first player in the modern era of the NFL to start several games on both offense and defense. Charles Haley, a major defensive force for the Cowboys during the prior four seasons, missed most of the 1996 season with injury. Tight end Jay Novacek, a key offensive threat in recent seasons, missed the entire season due to an injury.

After losing three of their first four games, the team returned to form, winning three straight before defeating former head coach Jimmy Johnson, then head coach of the Miami Dolphins, on the way to their fifth consecutive NFC East title. Although Dallas still moved the ball well on offense, they had serious late-season trouble scoring touchdowns (ultimately finishing just 25th in the league in points scored). They won games against Green Bay (21–6) and New England (12–6), the season's eventual Super Bowl participants, without scoring a touchdown (seven field goals against Green Bay and four against New England); Dallas's defense finished third in the league in fewest points allowed.

The season also saw the return of former Cowboy Herschel Walker who added versatility as both a running back and kick-off returner. Walker had ten carries for 83 yards and a touchdown and 27 kick returns for 779 yards.

The game of the year came on November 10 at San Francisco. The Cowboys stood at 5–4 with the Niners at 7–2; the Niners had won three straight meetings with the Cowboys since Barry Switzer was hired as head coach. Sacks by Broderick Thomas and Jim Schwantz knocked Niners quarterback Steve Young out of the game and Elvis Grbac, who had shredded the Cowboys defense the previous year, came on, and after the Niners blew a 10–0 lead they took a 17–10 lead with 11:30 left in the fourth quarter. The Cowboys drove to the Niners' redzone but Aikman was picked off in the endzone by Marquez Pope with 6:30 to go. Grbac, however, was intercepted at his six-yard line on the ensuing play by Fred Strickland, and three plays later Aikman connected with Eric Bjornson for the tying touchdown. In overtime a big Emmitt Smith run set up Chris Boniol's winning field goal. With their win and a Redskins loss to Arizona, the Cowboys surged to win the NFC East.

After defeating the Minnesota Vikings 40–15 in the first round of the playoffs at Texas Stadium (which was, until 2009, their last playoff win), the Cowboys traveled to Charlotte, North Carolina and lost to the second-year Carolina Panthers, who had won the NFC West at 12–4 in their second season. Star receiver Michael Irvin was injured in the opening moments of the Carolina playoff game. Deion Sanders was also injured and had to leave the game.

Notable additions to the team included linebacker Randall Godfrey and safety George Teague.

The Cowboys' win over the 49ers ended a decade-long losing streak in Week 10 games (this included an 0–3 record in week 10 games during World Championship seasons). Also, with the win against the Miami Dolphins at Joe Robbie Stadium, this was the first time the Cowboys franchise won a football game in South Florida. During this period, the Cowboys lost three Super Bowls in the Orange Bowl by a total of 11 points and lost twice to the Miami Dolphins in 1978 (23 to 16, also in a week 10 game) and in 1984 (28 to 21).

== Schedule ==
Week	Date	Opponent	Result	Record	Venue	Recap
1	September 2	at Chicago Bears	**L** 6–22	0–1	Soldier Field	Recap
2	September 8	**New York Giants**	**W** 27–0	1–1	Texas Stadium	Recap
3	September 15	Indianapolis Colts	**L** 24–25	1–2	Texas Stadium	Recap
4	September 22	at Buffalo Bills	**L** 7–10	1–3	Rich Stadium	Recap
5	September 30	at **Philadelphia Eagles**	**W** 23–19	2–3	Veterans Stadium	Recap
6	Bye					
7	October 13	**Arizona Cardinals**	**W** 17–3	3–3	Texas Stadium	Recap
8	October 20	Atlanta Falcons	**W** 32–28	4–3	Texas Stadium	Recap
9	October 27	at Miami Dolphins	**W** 29–10	5–3	Pro Player Stadium	Recap
10	November 3	**Philadelphia Eagles**	**L** 21–31	5–4	Texas Stadium	Recap
11	November 10	at San Francisco 49ers	**W** 20–17 (OT)	6–4	3com park	Recap
12	November 18	Green Bay Packers	**W** 21–6	7–4	Texas Stadium	Recap
13	November 24	at **New York Giants**	**L** 6–20	7–5	Giants Stadium	Recap
14	November 28	**Washington Redskins**	**W** 21–10	8–5	Texas Stadium	Recap
15	December 8	at **Arizona Cardinals**	**W** 10–6	9–5	Sun Devil Stadium	Recap
16	December 15	New England Patriots	**W** 12–6	10–5	Texas Stadium	Recap
17	December 22	at **Washington Redskins**	**L** 10–37	10–6	RFK Stadium	Recap
Note: Intra-division opponents are in **bold** text.

=== Playoffs ===
Round	Date	Opponent (seed)	Result	Record	Venue
Wild Card	December 28, 1996	Minnesota Vikings (6)	**W** 40–15	1–0	Texas Stadium
Divisional	January 5, 1997	at Carolina Panthers (2)	**L** 26–17	1–1	Ericsson Stadium

=== Game summaries ===
==== Week One at Chicago Bears ====
Dallas’ season as defending champions got off to a terrible start between the five-game suspension of Michael Irvin and a poor performance by Troy Aikman with two interceptions and just 21 passes completed. Emmitt Smith had seventy yards rushing but suffered temporary paralysis. The Cowboys surrendered four turnovers (Aikman had a fumble in the fourth quarter as did Deion Sanders) in the 22–6 loss.

==== Week Two vs. NY Giants ====
At home the Cowboys rebounded by intercepting Giants quarterback Dave Brown three times and limiting him to just 55 yards. Emmitt Smith and Sherman Williams combined for 31 carries and 120 yards while Aikman threw for 228 yards and three touchdowns in the 27–0 shutout.

==== Week Three vs. Indianapolis Colts ====
What fell an Aaron Bailey touchdown drop at Pittsburgh short of being the Super Bowl XXX matchup happened at Texas Stadium and the ensuing game was a tight affair (though held without a catch Bailey had 148 kick return yards). After the Cowboys raced to a 21–3 lead the Colts lived up to Jim Harbaugh’s “Captain Comeback” nickname as Harbaugh stormed the Colts to lead 22–21 in the third. After an exchange of field goals (25-24 Colts) in the fourth Aikman completed two passes to the Colts 39. Chris Boniol booted the ball for the 57-yard field goal but it bounced off the crossbar; asked in post game about his range he said it was “fifty-six and a half.”

==== Week Four at Buffalo Bills ====
Following an ugly loss at Pittsburgh the week before the Bills had to start young Todd Collins in injured Jim Kelly's stead hosting the team that had denied them in two Super Bowls. The Bills defense took over; Troy Aikman was intercepted three times and he suffered an ankle injury on his final throw as he was sandwiched by Bruce Smith and Shawn Price. The result was a 10-7 Bills win in a game with just 416 total net yards of offense.

==== Week Five at Philadelphia Eagles ====
Returning to the site of the controversial twin attempt to convert a late 4th down the year before, the Cowboys fell behind 10-0 then raced to lead 20-10 and ultimately won 23–19 in a game with seven turnovers, five of them by the Eagles. Rodney Peete of the Eagles was lost for the season during the game.

==== Week Seven vs. Arizona Cardinals ====
Michael Irvin returned from suspension and the Cowboys won 17–3. Irvin caught five passes on ten targets for 51 yards. Despite the return of Irvin teammate Darren Woodson lamented, “We’re not close to being a championship team. If we think getting Michael back fixes everything, we’re kidding ourselves.”

==== Week Eight vs. Atlanta Falcons ====
Few expected the 0-6 Falcons embroiled in controversy between coach June Jones and benched quarterback Jeff George to put up serious resistance to the Cowboys but after Dallas led 17-6 the Falcons behind Jamal Anderson and Bobby Hebert stormed to lead 28–25 with 7:09 to go. After an exchange of punts the Cowboys in the final 2:46 needed just one minute and a 60-yard Troy Aikman touchdown to Kelvin Martin to ultimately win 32–28.

==== Week Nine at Miami Dolphins ====
This was the most anticipated regular season game of the season in the meeting of the Cowboys and their former coach. But Jimmy Johnson, questioned incessantly all week about his former team, could only watch as his Dolphins collapsed from a 10–6 lead in the second to a 29–10 loss. While Troy Aikman (363 yards and three touchdowns) downplayed the meeting, Charles Haley, only in his fourth game of the season, spoke freely about hating Johnson over a “no practice, no play” rule during his time in Dallas; Haley was held without a tackle.

==== Week 10 vs Philadelphia Eagles ====
The Cowboys’ playoff hopes took a hit in a 31–21 home loss to the now-7-2 Eagles. Troy Aikman was intercepted twice while Ty Detmer threw one touchdown and ran in another.

==== Week 11 at San Francisco 49ers ====
For four seasons, this had been the rivalry of football and it was once again a league-wide measuring stick. After Steve Young was sacked out of the game, the Cowboys fell behind 17–10. Aikman was intercepted by Marquez Pope at San Francisco's 9-yard line in the final seven minutes, but on the next play, Elvis Grbac was intercepted by Fred Strickland. Given new life, Aikman found Eric Bjornson and the game went to overtime tied 17-17. A long Emmitt Smith run in overtime resulted in the winning Cowboys field goal. The win was Barry Switzer’s only win over the Niners and with the Eagles losing to the Buffalo Bills earlier that day Dallas was now just one game out in the NFC East.

==== Week 12 vs. Green Bay Packers ====
Seven Chris Boniol field goals were more than enough to beat the Packers 21–6, but the game was marred by a sideline argument between Switzer and head trainer Mike Woicik.

==== Week 13 at New York Giants ====
A 20–6 loss to the now-5-7 Giants in which the Cowboys yet again failed the score a touchdown left Dallas still on course for the NFC East but eliminated from a playoff bye.

==== Week 14 vs. Washington Redskins ====
Emmitt Smith rammed in three touchdowns, the first for Dallas since the San Francisco game, in a 21–10 win over a Redskins team in free fall after starting 7–1. Troy Aikman had his worst showing of the season with just nine completions, 63 yards, a pick, and a passer rating of 33.

==== Week 15 at Arizona Cardinals ====
Aikman had a touchdown to Irvin while George Teague and Darren Woodson picked off Boomer Esiason in a 10-6 Dallas win.

==== Week 16 vs. New England Patriots ====
Once again the Cowboys failed to score a touchdown but held the surging Patriots to just two field goals; rookie kicker Adam Vinatieri also ran down Herschel Walker on a long kick return as the Cowboys clinched the NFC East in a 12–6 win.

==== Week 17 at Washington Redskins ====
Having clinched the division and out of contention for a playoff bye the Cowboys rested Troy Aikman and Emmitt Smith among others while the Redskins, out of the playoffs at 8–7, played their final game at RFK Stadium and won going away 37–10. Wade Wilson and Jason Garrett combined for just 11 completions for Dallas.

=== Standings ===
NFC East
	W	L	T	PCT	PF	PA	STK
^{(3)} Dallas Cowboys	10	6	0	.625	286	250	L1
^{(5)} Philadelphia Eagles	10	6	0	.625	363	341	W2
Washington Redskins	9	7	0	.563	364	312	W1
Arizona Cardinals	7	9	0	.438	300	397	L1
New York Giants	6	10	0	.375	242	297	L2

== Playoffs ==
=== Wildcard vs. Minnesota Vikings (December 28, 1996) ===
The Cowboys put the game away in the first half in exploding to a 30–0 lead and ultimately winning 40–15. The Cowboys forced six Vikings turnovers and put up 438 yards of offense.

=== Divisional Round at Carolina Panthers (January 5, 1997) ===
The dynasty of the decade in essence ended in a 26–17 defeat to the second-year Panthers in their first playoff game. The week started ominously with sexual violence allegations against Michael Irvin and Erik Williams (later disproven). Irvin's weekend ended on the game's second play as he was brought down by Lamar Lathon and broke his collarbone. Deion Sanders was later injured on a tackle by Tyrone Poole as the Panthers clawed to a 23–17 lead in the fourth. Troy Aikman’s final two possessions ended in interceptions as the game combined for just 471 yards of offense. The Cowboys ultimately lost 26-17 to the #2 seeded Carolina Panthers in Charlotte.

== Roster ==
Dallas Cowboys 1996 roster
Quarterbacks: 8 Troy Aikman; 17 Jason Garrett; 11 Wade Wilson; Running backs: 48 Daryl Johnston FB; 36 Dominique Ross; 22 Emmitt Smith; 34 Herschel Walker; 20 Sherman Williams; Wide receivers: 87 Billy Davis; 88 Michael Irvin; 83 Kelvin Martin; 85 Kevin Williams; 80 Stepfret Williams; Tight ends: 81 Tyji Armstrong; 86 Eric Bjornson; 82 Johnny Mitchell; 84 Jay Novacek	Offensive linemen: 73 Larry Allen G; 53 Ray Donaldson C; 63 John Flannery G; 69 George Hegamin T; 60 Derek Kennard G; 61 Nate Newton G; 50 Clay Shiver C; 71 Mark Tuinei T; 79 Erik Williams T; Defensive linemen: 96 Shante Carver DE; 75 Tony Casillas DT; 72 Ray Childress DT; 94 Charles Haley DE; 95 Chad Hennings DT; 99 Hurvin McCormack DE; 97 Kavika Pittman DE; 92 Tony Tolbert DE	Linebackers: 57 Alan Campos OLB; 56 Randall Godfrey OLB; 98 Godfrey Myles OLB; 52 Jim Schwantz MLB; 59 Darrin Smith OLB; 55 Fred Strickland MLB; 51 Broderick Thomas OLB; Defensive backs: 40 Bill Bates SS; 35 Wendell Davis CB; 24 Roger Harper FS; 31 Brock Marion FS; 21 Deion Sanders CB; 26 Kevin Smith CB; 30 George Teague FS; 42 Charlie Williams CB; 28 Darren Woodson SS; Special teams: 18 Chris Boniol K; 70 Dale Hellestrae LS; 19 John Jett P	Reserve lists: 91 Darren Benson DT (IR); 29 Alundis Brice CB (IR); 78 Leon Lett DT (Susp.); 93 Mike Ulufale DT (IR); -- Kendell Watkins TE (IR); Practice squad: 66 Tony Hutson G; Rookies in italics 53 active, 5 inactive, 1 practice squad

== Publications ==
The Football Encyclopedia ISBN 0-312-11435-4
Total Football ISBN 0-06-270170-3
Cowboys Have Always Been My Heroes ISBN 0-446-51950-2
