= Keith Lyle =

American football player (born 1972)

No. 35
- Position: Safety

Personal information
- Born: April 17, 1972 (age 54); Washington D.C., U.S.
- Listed height: 6 ft 2 in (1.88 m)
- Listed weight: 210 lb (95 kg)

Career information
- High school: Marshall (Falls Church, Virginia)
- College: Virginia
- NFL draft: 1994: 3rd round, 71st overall pick

Career history
- Los Angeles / St. Louis Rams (1994–2000); Washington Redskins (2001); Atlanta Falcons (2002)*; San Diego Chargers (2002)
- * Offseason or practice squad member only

Awards and highlights
- Super Bowl champion (XXXIV); NFL Interceptions leader (1996); PFWA All-Rookie Team (1994); St. Louis Rams 10th Anniversary Team; First-team All-ACC (1993); Second-team All-ACC (1991)

Career NFL statistics
- Tackles: 520
- Interceptions: 31
- Sacks: 5
- Stats at Pro Football Reference

Keith Allen Lyle (born April 17, 1972) is an American former professional football player who was a safety in the National Football League (NFL). He played college football for the Virginia Cavaliers. Lyle was selected by the Los Angeles Rams in the third round of the 1994 NFL draft. He also played for the Washington Redskins and San Diego Chargers.

== Early life ==
In high school, he played quarterback and safety for George C. Marshall High School, in Falls Church, Virginia. Keith's father Garry Lyle played for the Chicago Bears from 1967 to 1974.

== Professional career ==
From 1995 to 1998, Lyle intercepted 23 passes, the most in the NFL during that period. During the 1996 NFL season, Lyle, along with Tyrone Braxton of the Denver Broncos, led the NFL in interceptions with nine. Throughout his career with the Rams, Lyle also served as the team's holder. During his time with the Rams, Lyle started in 89 of 105 games.

=== NFL statistics ===
Year	Team	GP	COMB	TOTAL	AST	SACK	FF	FR	FR YDS	INT	IR YDS	AVG IR	LNG	TD	PD
1994	LOS	16	16	13	3	0.0	1	0	0	2	001	1	1	0	05
1995	STL	16	90	72	18	0.0	1	0	0	3	042	14	31	0	06
1996	STL	16	76	62	14	0.0	1	0	0	9	152	17	48	0	10
1997	STL	16	84	68	14	2.0	3	0	0	8	102	13	39	0	11
1998	STL	16	84	60	22	1.0	0	0	0	3	020	07	20	0	14
1999	STL	09	30	23	07	1.0	0	0	0	2	010	05	10	0	2
2000	STL	16	81	65	16	0.0	1	1	0	1	009	09	09	0	3
2001	WSH	16	31	24	07	1.0	0	0	0	1	000	00	00	0	3
2002	SD	15	30	25	05	0.0	1	0	0	2	026	13	26	0	2
Career		136	513	405	108	5.0	8	1	0	31	362	12	68	0	56
