= Keno Hills =

American football player (born 1973)

No. 76
- Positions: Guard, tackle

Personal information
- Born: June 13, 1973 (age 53); Tampa, Florida, U.S.
- Listed height: 6 ft 6 in (1.98 m)
- Listed weight: 305 lb (138 kg)

Career information
- High school: Tampa Bay Tech
- College: Kent State; Louisiana-Lafayette
- NFL draft: 1996: 6th round, 179th overall pick

Career history
- New Orleans Saints (1996–1999); Chicago Bears (1999); Miami Dolphins (2000)*
- * Offseason or practice squad member only

Career NFL statistics
- Games played: 22
- Games started: 7
- Stats at Pro Football Reference

Keno J. Hills (born June 13, 1973) is an American former professional football player who was an offensive lineman in the National Football League (NFL) for the New Orleans Saints. He was selected in the sixth round of the 1996 NFL draft after playing college football for the Louisiana Ragin' Cajuns.

In late December 1998, Hills was charged with drug and weapons violations. Then 25, he was booked for possession of heroin with intent to distribute and for possession of a firearm during a drug transaction. The charges were later dropped.

Hills did not see any field action with the Saints in 1999 — inactive for seven contests. He signed with the Chicago Bears on December 30, 1999, and was inactive for his only game on Chicago's 53-man roster. He was released by the Bears on June 16, 2000.

The Miami Dolphins signed Hills on June 21, 2000, as a free agent offensive tackle with a one-year contract. He went to the Dolphins' training camp but was released in the first cut.
