= Dameian Jeffries =

American football player (born 1973)

No. 96, 76
- Position: Defensive end

Personal information
- Born: May 7, 1973 (age 53); Sylacauga, Alabama, U.S.
- Listed height: 6 ft 4 in (1.93 m)
- Listed weight: 277 lb (126 kg)

Career information
- High school: Comer (Sylacauga)
- College: Alabama
- NFL draft: 1995: 4th round, 108th overall pick

Career history
- New Orleans Saints (1995); Baltimore Ravens (1997)*; Denver Broncos (1998)*; Mobile Admirals (1999)
- * Offseason or practice squad member only

Awards and highlights
- National champion (1992); Second-team All-American (1994); Second-team All-SEC (1994)

Career NFL statistics
- Tackles: 1
- Stats at Pro Football Reference

Dameian Jeffries (born May 7, 1973) is an American former professional football player who was a defensive end in the National Football League (NFL). He played college football for the Alabama Crimson Tide before being selected by the New Orleans Saints in the fourth round of the 1995 NFL draft with the 108th overall pick. He appeared in two games for the Saints in 1995. Jeffries later played for the Mobile Admirals in the short-lived Regional Football League (RFL) in 1999.

Baseball player Zelous Wheeler is his nephew.
