= Israel Ifeanyi =

Nigerian gridiron football player (born 1970)

No. 95
- Position: Defensive end

Personal information
- Born: November 21, 1970 (age 55); Lagos, Nigeria
- Listed height: 6 ft 3 in (1.91 m)
- Listed weight: 246 lb (112 kg)

Career information
- College: USC
- NFL draft: 1996: 2nd round, 46th overall pick

Career history
- San Francisco 49ers (1996); Tampa Bay Buccaneers (1998)*; San Diego Chargers (1998–1999)
- * Offseason or practice squad member only

Awards and highlights
- Second-team All-Pac-10 (1995)
- Stats at Pro Football Reference

Israel Ifeanyi (born November 21, 1970) is a Nigerian former professional American football defensive end who played for the San Francisco 49ers and San Diego Chargers. He was selected in the second round of the 1996 NFL draft with the 46th overall pick. He had a career-ending knee injury during training camp, cutting his career short as it was on the rise. Subsequently, he went on to coach high school football for 10 years, and was the head coach for eight years at Desert Christian High School in Lancaster, California, where he started the program and made the playoffs during several seasons.

During his collegiate career at USC he wore the famous #55 and was a collegiate All-American and defensive captain of the 1996 Champion Rose Bowl Game.
