= 1995 Atlanta Falcons season =

NFL team season

- Owner: Rankin Smith
- Head coach: June Jones
- Defensive coordinator: Joe Haering
- Home stadium: Georgia Dome

Results
- Record: 9–7
- Division place: 2nd NFC West
- Playoffs: Lost Wild Card Playoffs (at Packers) 20–37
- Pro Bowlers: RB Craig Heyward; DE Chris Doleman; LB Jessie Tuggle; K Morten Andersen; ST Elbert Shelley

The 1995 Atlanta Falcons season was the franchise’s thirtieth season in the National Football League (NFL). The team finished with a 9–7 record, and qualified for the post-season as a wild card team.

The Falcons’ pass defense gave up 4,541 yards through the air in 1995, which was a league record until 2011. (Note: Both the 2011 Packers and 2011 Patriots surrendered more passing yards.) The Falcons’ defense faced a total of 650 pass attempts, the most all time. (Note: As of the end of the 2011 season) The 405 passes completed against Atlanta in 1995 are fifth-most in NFL history. Still, Atlanta's points surrendered was 19th in the league, and its point-differential for the season was +13.

Falcons receivers Eric Metcalf, Bert Emanuel, and Terence Mathis became the third trio of teammates with over 1,000 receiving yards in the same season – a rare occurrence, with only five such trios in NFL history (as of 2026). This is the oldest Falcons roster in team history, at an average of 28.5 years old.

== Offseason ==
=== NFL draft ===
1995 Atlanta Falcons draft
Round	Pick	Player	Position	College	Notes
1	26	Devin Bush	Safety	Florida State	
2	41	Ron Davis	Cornerback	Tennessee	
3	77	Lorenzo Styles	Linebacker	Ohio State	
5	145	Roell Preston *	Wide receiver	Mississippi	
6	181	Travis Hall	Defensive tackle	BYU	
7	245	John Burrough	Defensive end	Wyoming	
Made roster * Made at least one Pro Bowl during career

== Personnel ==
=== Roster ===
1995 Atlanta Falcons roster
Quarterbacks (QB): 1 Jeff George; 3 Bobby Hebert; 7 Perry Klein; 13 Browning Nagle; Running backs (RB): 32 Jamal Anderson; 34 Craig Heyward; 21 Eric Metcalf; Wide receivers (WR): 89 J. J. Birden; 80 Tyrone Brown; 87 Bert Emanuel; 81 Terance Mathis; 85 Roell Preston; 83 Ricky Sanders; Tight ends (TE): 88 Harper LeBel LS; 86 Mitch Lyons	Offensive linemen (OL): 65 Roman Fortin C; 66 Lincoln Kennedy T; 55 Nate Miller G; 64 Jeff Pahukoa G; 62 David Richards T; 51 Jim Ritcher G; 61 Robbie Tobeck G; 70 Bob Whitfield T; 69 Gene Williams G; 72 Mike Zandofsky G; Defensive linemen (DL): 68 Mel Agee DT; 92 Lester Archambeau DE; 91 John Burrough DE; 56 Chris Doleman DE; 67 Moe Gardner DT; 97 Jumpy Geathers DT; 98 Travis Hall DT; 95 Pierce Holt DT; 90 Chuck Smith DE	Linebackers (LB): 50 Ron George OLB; 57 Clay Matthews OLB; 59 Lorenzo Styles MLB; 99 Darryl Talley OLB; 52 Ken Tippins OLB; 58 Jessie Tuggle MLB; Defensive backs (DB): 42 Devin Bush FS; 28 Ron Davis CB; 27 Brad Edwards FS; 47 Roger Harper FS; 44 D. J. Johnson CB; 38 Rich Miano SS; 22 Alton Montgomery SS; 36 Kevin Ross SS; 37 Elbert Shelley CB; 24 Terry Taylor CB; 45 Darnell Walker CB; Special teams (ST): 5 Morten Andersen K; 4 Dan Stryzinski P	Practice squad: 11 Ed Howard WR; 35 Tony Vinson RB; Reserve: 39 Eric Jack CB (IR); 26 Anthony Phillips CB (IR); 53 active, 2 inactive. 2 practice squad Rookies in italics

== Regular season ==
=== Schedule ===
Week	Date	Opponent	Result	Record	Venue	Attendance
1	September 3	**Carolina Panthers**	**W** 23–20 (OT)	1–0	Georgia Dome	58,808
2	September 10	at **San Francisco 49ers**	**L** 10–41	1–1	3Com Park	63,627
3	September 17	at **New Orleans Saints**	**W** 27–24 (OT)	2–1	Louisiana Superdome	57,442
4	September 24	New York Jets	**W** 13–3	3–1	Georgia Dome	40,778
5	October 1	New England Patriots	**W** 30–17	4–1	Georgia Dome	47,114
6	Bye					
7	October 12	at **St. Louis Rams**	**L** 19–21	4–2	Busch Memorial Stadium	59,700
8	October 22	at Tampa Bay Buccaneers	**W** 24–21	5–2	Tampa Stadium	66,135
9	October 29	Dallas Cowboys	**L** 13–28	5–3	Georgia Dome	70,089
10	November 5	Detroit Lions	**W** 34–22	6–3	Georgia Dome	49,619
11	November 12	at Buffalo Bills	**L** 17–23	6–4	Rich Stadium	62,690
12	November 19	**St. Louis Rams**	**W** 31–6	7–4	Georgia Dome	46,309
13	November 26	at Arizona Cardinals	**L** 37–40 (OT)	7–5	Sun Devil Stadium	35,147
14	December 3	at Miami Dolphins	**L** 20–21	7–6	Joe Robbie Stadium	63,395
15	December 10	**New Orleans Saints**	**W** 19–14	8–6	Georgia Dome	54,603
16	December 17	at **Carolina Panthers**	**L** 17–21	8–7	Memorial Stadium	53,833
17	December 24	**San Francisco 49ers**	**W** 28–27	9–7	Georgia Dome	51,785
Note: Intra-division opponents are in **bold** text.

=== Standings ===
NFC West
	W	L	T	PCT	PF	PA	STK
^{(2)} San Francisco 49ers	11	5	0	.688	457	258	L1
^{(6)} Atlanta Falcons	9	7	0	.563	362	349	W1
St. Louis Rams	7	9	0	.438	309	418	L3
Carolina Panthers	7	9	0	.438	289	325	L1
New Orleans Saints	7	9	0	.438	319	348	W1

== Playoffs ==
Week	Date	Opponent	Result	Record	Venue	Attendance
Wild Card	December 31	at Green Bay Packers	L 37–20	9–8	Lambeau Field	60,453
