= Nate Newton =

Nate Newton may refer to:

- Nate Newton (American football)
- Nate Newton (musician)
