= NFC West =

Division of the National Football Conference

- Formerly: Western Conference Coastal Division (1967–1969)
- Conference: National Football Conference (NFC)
- League: National Football League (NFL)
- Sport: American football
- Founded: 1967
- No. of teams: 4
- Country: United States
- Most recent champion: Seattle Seahawks (2025)
- Most titles: San Francisco 49ers (22)
- 2026 NFL season

NFC West team locations

The NFC West (formerly known as the Western Conference Coastal Division) is one of the four divisions of the National Football Conference (NFC) in the National Football League (NFL). It currently has four members: the Arizona Cardinals, the Los Angeles Rams, the San Francisco 49ers, and the Seattle Seahawks.

== History ==
The division was formed in 1967 as the National Football League Coastal Division, keeping with the theme of having all of the league's divisions starting with the letter "C." The division was so named because its teams were fairly close to the coasts of the United States, although they were on opposite coasts, making for long travel between division rivals. The NFL Coastal Division had four members: Atlanta Falcons, Baltimore Colts, Los Angeles Rams, and San Francisco 49ers. Los Angeles and San Francisco occupied the West Coast, while Baltimore maintained its dominance over the lesser teams that remained in the division. Atlanta was placed in the division instead of the expansion New Orleans Saints despite being further east than three Eastern Conference teams (Cowboys, Cardinals, and the aforementioned Saints).

After the AFL–NFL merger in 1970, the division was renamed the NFC West. The Baltimore Colts moved to the AFC East and were replaced by the Saints, who came from the Eastern Conference (the Saints played in the Capitol Division in 1967 and '69, and the Century Division in 1968). In 1976, the newly formed Seattle Seahawks spent one season in this division (Seattle did not play the other four members of the division home-and-home in 1976, playing each of the other 13 NFC teams and the other expansion team of 1976, the Tampa Bay Buccaneers) before moving to the AFC West. Except for that one year, the division remained the same until 1995 with the addition of the new Carolina Panthers team. The Rams moved to St. Louis before that same season, making the division geographically inaccurate. Ten of the fifteen NFC teams were based west of Atlanta, and twelve of them were based west of Charlotte (all except the Redskins, Eagles and Giants).

The 2002 re-alignment changed the entire look of the NFC West. The Falcons, Panthers, and Saints moved into the NFC South; while the Cardinals moved in from the NFC East and the Seahawks returned from the AFC West. The Rams remained in the West, preserving the historical rivalry with the 49ers that has existed since 1950, and thus had been the only team in the division that was located east of the Rocky Mountains until 2015. Despite this, the re-alignment made the NFC West have all of its teams based west of the Mississippi River. With the Rams' return to Los Angeles in 2016, the entire NFC West is now located west of the Rockies for the first time in its history; all teams except for the Cardinals are based in the Pacific Time Zone (since most of Arizona does not observe daylight saving time, the clocks are the same as Pacific Daylight Time from the second Sunday in March until the first Sunday of November, through at least 2027). The 2016 season marked the first time neither the 49ers nor Seahawks played a division game east of the Rocky Mountains.

The NFC West became the second division since the 2002 realignment (the NFC South was the first) to have each of its teams make a conference championship game appearance: Los Angeles (2018, 2021, and 2025), Arizona (2008 and 2015), San Francisco (2011, 2012, 2013, 2019, 2021 and 2023), and Seattle (2005, 2013, 2014, and 2025). Also since 2002, each team has won at least three division titles, one of only two divisions in the league to do so. All of its teams have appeared in a Super Bowl at least once since the 2002 realignment (the only other division accomplishing this being the NFC South): Arizona (2008), Los Angeles Rams (2018, 2021), San Francisco (2012, 2019, 2023), and Seattle (2005, 2013, 2014, 2025). As of 2025, the NFC West is the only division in the NFC that has not seen at least one of its teams win a Super Bowl when entering that year's playoffs as a wild-card entry (the same historical fact holds true for both the AFC East and AFC South).

In 2010, the NFC West became the first division in NFL history to have a champion with a losing record, after the Seattle Seahawks won the division title with a record of 7–9. They were joined in this distinction in 2014 by the Carolina Panthers, who won the NFC South with a record of 7–8–1, 2020 by the Washington Football Team, who won the NFC East also with a record of 7–9, 2022 by the Tampa Bay Buccaneers, who won the NFC South with a record of 8−9, and 2025 by the Carolina Panthers, who won the NFC South with a record of 8-9.

Since the end of the 2020 NFL regular season, the 49ers lead the division with a record of 589–499–16 (137–166–1 since re-alignment) with five Super Bowl titles and an overall playoff record of 33–22. The Rams hold a record of 586–575–21 (130–173–1 since re-alignment) with five Super Bowl appearances and two wins to go with a 25–26 overall playoff record. The Cardinals hold a 135–167–2 record since joining the NFC West (566–770–41 overall) and a loss in Super Bowl XLIII, currently with a 7–9 playoff record, 5–4 as a member of the NFC West. The Seahawks hold a record of 179–124–1 since joining the NFC West (367–340–1 overall), with four Super Bowl appearances, winning Super Bowl XLVIII to go with a playoff record of 17–18; they are currently 14–13 in the playoffs as a member of the NFC West, having gone 3–5 while in the AFC West. Since re-alignment, the Seahawks have led the division in wins, division titles, and playoff appearances.

The NFC West became the 4th division in NFL history to have three of its teams advance to the Divisional Round in the 2025–26 playoffs. That season, the Seahawks advanced to, and eventually won, Super Bowl LX after defeating both the 49ers, 41–6, and the Rams, 31–27, in the Divisional and Conference rounds, respectively.

== Results ==
=== Team Success ===
Team success
Team	Years in division	Playoff berths	Division championships	NFC Championship Game appearances	Super Bowl appearances	Super Bowl wins	Refs
San Francisco 49ers	1967–present	29	22	19	8	5	
Los Angeles Rams	1967–present	28	17	12	5	2	
Seattle Seahawks	1976, 2002–present	16	10	4	4	2	
Arizona Cardinals	2002–present	5	3	2	1	0	
Atlanta Falcons	1967–2001	6	2	1	1	0	
New Orleans Saints	1970–2001	5	2	0	0	0	
Carolina Panthers	1995–2001	1	1	1	0	0	
Baltimore Colts	1967–1969	1	1	0	1	0	

=== Season-by-season ===
Table legend
Super Bowl champions ‡	Conference champions ^{*}	Division champions ^{^}	Wild card berth ^{#}

NFC West yearly standings and team records
Season	Team (record)					Notes	Refs
Season	1st	2nd	3rd	4th	5th	Notes	Refs
Western Conference Coastal Division
1967	Los Angeles (11–1–2)^{^}	Baltimore (11–1–2)	San Francisco (7–7)	Atlanta (1–12–1)	—	The Coastal Division was formed with four inaugural members. The Baltimore Colts, the Los Angeles Rams and the San Francisco 49ers joined from the Western Division, while the Atlanta Falcons joined from the Eastern Division.	
1968	Baltimore (13–1) ^{*}	Los Angeles (10–3–1)	San Francisco (7–6–1)	Atlanta (2–12)	—		
1969	Los Angeles (11–3) ^{^}	Baltimore (8–5–1)	Atlanta (6–8)	San Francisco (4–8–2)	—		
NFC West Divsion
1970	San Francisco (10–3–1) ^{^}	Los Angeles (9–4–1)	Atlanta (4–8–2)	New Orleans (2–11–1)		With the completion of the AFL–NFL merger, the 49ers, Falcons, Rams, and Saints were placed into the West Division of the National Football Conference (NFC).	
1971	San Francisco (9–5) ^{^}	Los Angeles (8–5–1)	Atlanta (7–6–1)	New Orleans (4–8–2)	—		
1972	San Francisco (8–5–1) ^{^}	Atlanta (7–7)	Los Angeles (6–7–1)	New Orleans (2–11–1)	—		
1973	Los Angeles (12–2) ^{^}	Atlanta (9–5)	San Francisco (5–9)	New Orleans (5–9)	—		
1974	Los Angeles (10–4) ^{^}	San Francisco (6–8)	New Orleans (5–9)	Atlanta (3–11)	—		
1975	Los Angeles (12–2) ^{^}	San Francisco (5–9)	Atlanta (4–10)	New Orleans (2–12)	—		
1976	Los Angeles (10–3–1) ^{^}	San Francisco (8–6)	Atlanta (4–10)	New Orleans (4–10)	Seattle (2–12)	An expansion team, the Seattle Seahawks, joined the division.	
1977	Los Angeles (10–4) ^{^}	Atlanta (7–7)	San Francisco (5–9)	New Orleans (3–11)	—	The Seattle Seahawks left to join the AFC West after just one season with the NFC West.	
1978	Los Angeles (12–4) ^{^}	Atlanta (9–7) ^{#}	New Orleans (7–9)	San Francisco (2–14)	—		
1979	Los Angeles (9–7) ^{*}	New Orleans (8–8)	Atlanta (6–10)	San Francisco (2–14)	—		
1980	Atlanta (12–4) ^{^}	Los Angeles (11–5) ^{#}	San Francisco (6–10)	New Orleans (1–15)	—		
1981	San Francisco (13–3) ‡	Atlanta (7–9)	Los Angeles (6–10)	New Orleans (4–12)	—		
1982	Atlanta (5–4) ^{#}	New Orleans (4–5)	San Francisco (3–6)	L.A. Rams (2–7)	—	The NFL season was shortened to nine games by a strike, with divisions temporarily suspended and standings based on conference alone.	
1983	San Francisco (10–6) ^{^}	L.A. Rams (9–7) ^{#}	New Orleans (8–8)	Atlanta (7–9)	—		
1984	San Francisco (15–1) ‡	L.A. Rams (10–6) ^{#}	New Orleans (7–9)	Atlanta (4–12)	—		
1985	L.A. Rams (11–5) ^{^}	San Francisco (10–6) ^{#}	New Orleans (5–11)	Atlanta (4–12)	—		
1986	San Francisco (10–5–1) ^{^}	L.A. Rams (10–6) ^{#}	Atlanta (7–8–1)	New Orleans (7–9)	—		
1987	San Francisco (13–2) ^{^}	New Orleans (12–3) ^{#}	L.A. Rams (6–9)	Atlanta (3–12)	—	The strike of 1987 reduced the regular season from 16 to 15 games.	
1988	San Francisco (10–6) ‡	L.A. Rams (10–6) ^{#}	New Orleans (10–6)	Atlanta (5–11)	—		
1989	San Francisco (14–2) ‡	L.A. Rams (11–5) ^{#}	New Orleans (9–7)	Atlanta (3–13)	—		
1990	San Francisco (14–2) ^{^}	New Orleans (8–8) ^{#}	L.A. Rams (5–11)	Atlanta (5–11)	—		
1991	New Orleans (11–5) ^{^}	Atlanta (10–6) ^{#}	San Francisco (10–6)	L.A. Rams (3–13)	—		
1992	San Francisco (14–2) ^{^}	New Orleans (12–4) ^{#}	Atlanta (6–10)	L.A. Rams (6–10)	—		
1993	San Francisco (10–6) ^{^}	New Orleans (8–8)	Atlanta (6–10)	L.A. Rams (5–11)	—		
1994	San Francisco (13–3) ‡	New Orleans (7–9)	Atlanta (7–9)	L.A. Rams (4–12)	—		
1995	San Francisco (11–5) ^{^}	Atlanta (9–7) ^{#}	St. Louis (7–9)	Carolina (7–9)	New Orleans (7–9)	An expansion team, the Carolina Panthers, joined the division. The Los Angeles Rams relocated to St. Louis.	
1996	Carolina (12–4) ^{^}	San Francisco (12–4) ^{#}	St. Louis (6–10)	Atlanta (3–13)	New Orleans (3–13)		
1997	San Francisco (13–3) ^{^}	Carolina (7–9)	Atlanta (7–9)	New Orleans (6–10)	St. Louis (5–11)		
1998	Atlanta (14–2) ^{*}	San Francisco (12–4) ^{#}	New Orleans (6–10)	Carolina (4–12)	St. Louis (4–12)		
1999	St. Louis (13–3) ‡	Carolina (8–8)	Atlanta (5–11)	San Francisco (4–12)	New Orleans (3–13)		
2000	New Orleans (10–6) ^{^}	St. Louis (10–6) ^{#}	Carolina (7–9)	San Francisco (6–10)	Atlanta (4–12)		
2001	St. Louis (14–2) ^{*}	San Francisco (12–4) ^{#}	New Orleans (7–9)	Atlanta (7–9)	Carolina (1–15)		
2002	San Francisco (10–6) ^{^}	St. Louis (7–9)	Seattle (7–9)	Arizona (5–11)	—	The NFL realigned to create four divisions in both conferences with four teams in each division. The 49ers, Cardinals, Rams, and Seahawks were placed in the NFC West, while the Falcons, Panthers, and Saints were placed in the NFC South.	
2003	St. Louis (12–4) ^{^}	Seattle (10–6) ^{#}	San Francisco (7–9)	Arizona (4–12)	—		
2004	Seattle (9–7) ^{^}	St. Louis (8–8) ^{#}	Arizona (6–10)	San Francisco (2–14)	—		
2005	Seattle (13–3) ^{*}	St. Louis (6–10)	Arizona (5–11)	San Francisco (4–12)	—		
2006	Seattle (9–7) ^{^}	St. Louis (8–8)	San Francisco (7–9)	Arizona (5–11)	—		
2007	Seattle (10–6) ^{^}	Arizona (8–8)	San Francisco (5–11)	St. Louis (3–13)	—		
2008	Arizona (9–7) ^{*}	San Francisco (7–9)	Seattle (4–12)	St. Louis (2–14)	—		
2009	Arizona (10–6) ^{^}	San Francisco (8–8)	Seattle (5–11)	St. Louis (1–15)	—		
2010	Seattle (7–9) ^{^}	St. Louis (7–9)	San Francisco (6–10)	Arizona (5–11)	—		
2011	San Francisco (13–3) ^{^}	Arizona (8–8)	Seattle (7–9)	St. Louis (2–14)	—		
2012	San Francisco (11–4–1) ^{*}	Seattle (11–5) ^{#}	St. Louis (7–8–1)	Arizona (5–11)	—		
2013	Seattle (13–3) ‡	San Francisco (12–4) ^{#}	Arizona (10–6)	St. Louis (7–9)	—		
2014	Seattle (12–4) ^{*}	Arizona (11–5) ^{#}	San Francisco (8–8)	St. Louis (6–10)			
2015	Arizona (13–3) ^{^}	Seattle (10–6) ^{#}	St. Louis (7–9)	San Francisco (5–11)	—		
2016	Seattle (10–5–1) ^{^}	Arizona (7–8–1)	Los Angeles (4–12)	San Francisco (2–14)	—	The St. Louis Rams relocated back to Los Angeles and became the Los Angeles Rams.	
2017	L.A. Rams (11–5) ^{^}	Seattle (9–7)	Arizona (8–8)	San Francisco (6–10)	—		
2018	L.A. Rams (13–3) ^{*}	Seattle (10–6) ^{#}	San Francisco (4–12)	Arizona (3–13)	—		
2019	San Francisco (13–3) ^{*}	Seattle (11–5) ^{#}	L.A. Rams (9–7)	Arizona (5–10–1)	—		
2020	Seattle (12–4) ^{^}	L.A. Rams (10–6) ^{#}	Arizona (8–8)	San Francisco (6–10)	—		
2021	L.A. Rams (12–5) ‡	Arizona (11–6) ^{#}	San Francisco (10–7) ^{#}	Seattle (7–10)	—	The NFL expanded its season from 16 to 17 games a year.	
2022	San Francisco (13–4) ^{^}	Seattle (9–8) ^{#}	L.A. Rams (5–12)	Arizona (4–13)	—		
2023	San Francisco (12–5) ^{*}	L.A. Rams (10–7) ^{#}	Seattle (9–8)	Arizona (4–13)	—		
2024	L.A. Rams (10–7) ^{^}	Seattle (10–7)	Arizona (8–9)	San Francisco (6–11)	—		
2025	Seattle (14–3) ‡	L.A. Rams (12–5) ^{#}	San Francisco (12–5) ^{#}	Arizona (3–14)	—		
2026	San Francisco (8–1)	Seattle (6–4)	L.A. Rams (6–4)	Arizona (3–7)	—		

== See also ==
- NFL rivalries § NFC West
