= William Strong (American football) =

American football player (born 1971)

No. 41
- Position: Cornerback

Personal information
- Born: November 3, 1971 (age 55); Chester, South Carolina, U.S.
- Listed height: 5 ft 10 in (1.78 m)
- Listed weight: 191 lb (87 kg)

Career information
- High school: Lewisville (Richburg, South Carolina
- College: NC State (1991–1994)
- NFL draft: 1995: 5th round, 148th overall pick

Career history
- New Orleans Saints (1995–1998)

Career NFL statistics
- Games played: 9
- Tackles: 1
- Stats at Pro Football Reference

William Blake Strong (born November 3, 1971) is an American former professional football cornerback and who played for the New Orleans Saints of the National Football League (NFL). He played college football for the NC State Wolfpack.

== Early life ==
Strong was born on November 3, 1971, in Chester, South Carolina. He attended Lewisville High School in Richburg, South Carolina.

== College career ==
Strong played college football for the NC State Wolfpack from 1991 to 1994 and was a four-year letterman. He spent his first season as a reserve defensive back and was also used on special teams. Strong finished his career at NC State with six interceptions and 22 pass break ups.

== Professional career ==
Strong was selected in the fifth round, with the 148th overall selection, by the New Orleans Saints in the 1995 NFL draft. On July 14, he signed his rookie contract with the team. On August 27, Strong was released and was signed to the practice squad the following day. On December 8, he was elevated to the active roster but did not appear in any games in 1995. In 1996, Strong played in nine games and recorded one tackle. On July 21, 1997, he was placed on the left squad list after contemplating retirement. On February 12, 1998, Strong was reinstated by the league. On August 24, he was released by the team.
