= Mike Salmon (American football) =

American football player (born 1970)

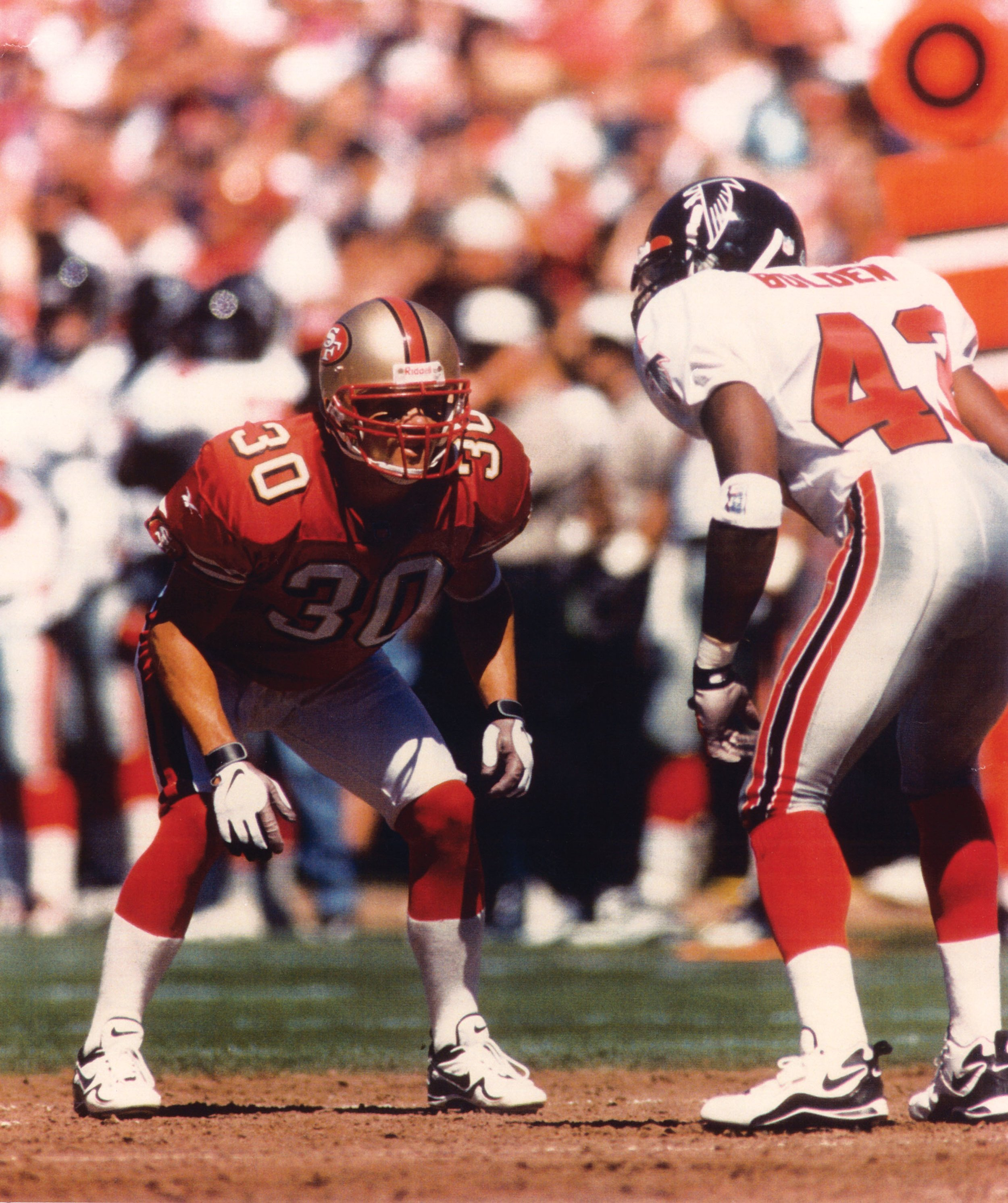

Profile
- Position: Defensive back

Personal information
- Born: December 27, 1970 (age 55); Long Beach, California, U.S.
- Listed height: 6 ft 1 in (1.85 m)
- Listed weight: 210 lb (95 kg)

Career information
- College: USC

Career history
- San Francisco 49ers (1994)*; Houston Oilers (1995)*; San Francisco 49ers (1996)*; Buffalo Bills (1996); San Francisco 49ers (1996–1997); Rhein Fire (1995–1996)
- * Offseason or practice squad member only
- Stats at Pro Football Reference

Michael William Salmon (born December 27, 1970) is an American former professional football player who was a defensive back in the National Football League (NFL). He played college football for the USC Trojans.

== Football career ==
Salmon named both the 5A Arizona High school football Player of the year and the Arizona Athlete of the year in 1989 by the Arizona Republic. He was recruited out of Greenway high school in 3 sports, football, baseball and basketball. In 1988 Salmon was selected by USA Today as the National H.S. Player of the Week after helping Greenway upset the #1 ranked Brophy Broncos on T.V. A game in which Salmon caught a T.D., threw for 2 T.D.'s, intercepted 2 passes, kicked 2 field goals and made 4 extra points all in the first half. Salmon later signed with the University of Southern California. Salmon was a team captain, started all four seasons at either free safety, strong safety, cornerback, outside linebacker, kicker, and punt returner. He holds the schools of all time record for positions started in a career. Salmon played both football and baseball for the USC Trojans. He batted .280 as a junior on the USC Trojans baseball team. Salmon turned down a chance to play professional baseball, like his older brother Tim, rejecting an $80,000 offer by the Philadelphia Phillies to accept USC's scholarship offer. Against Washington State in 1993, Salmon beat out future NFL kicker Cole Ford . Salmon entered the game and made four field goals from greater than 38 yards and was named Pac-10 Player of the week. "Here's a guy who hadn't kicked since high school, and he couldn't wait to get in there and kick," Coach John Robinson said. "If it'd been me, I'd have been scared to death." Salmon also kicked the game winning kick that year at Oregon as time expired in front of a sold out stadium. Salmon was on the Deans List twice at USC and also had the top GPA on the football team in 1992.

"He may be more important to our defense than (quarterback) Rob Johnson is to our offense," Salmon's defensive coordinator at USC, Don Lindsey, said. "We have an outstanding backup quarterback in Kyle Wachholz, so if we lost Rob it would hurt us, but it wouldn't be a killer. But if we lost Mike, the defense would lose a whole lot." On Senior Day in 1993, against the UCLA Bruins, as Salmon entered the Coliseum for the last time, USC coach John Robinson introduced Salmon as "one of the most competitive guys I have ever had".

Salmon played in the NFL for the San Francisco 49ers (1994-1997) and the Buffalo Bills (1996). Salmon backed up the two NFC pro bowl safeties Merton Hanks and Tim MacDonald in San Francisco. In Buffalo by backed up AFC pro bowl safeties Henry Jones and Kurt Shultz. In 1997, he suffered a career ending cartilage tear to his knee. Salmon played two seasons (1995-1996) of NFL Europe with Rhein Fire in Düsseldorf, Germany. Salmon had four interceptions in two years with Rhein Fire where he was later named to the All World League First-team at Free Safety and team captain.

== Personal ==
Mike Salmon is the younger brother of former Major League Baseball (MLB) right fielder Tim Salmon, who was named the American League's Rookie of the Year in 1993 and World Series Champion in 2002 for the Anaheim Angels. His son Jack Salmon was drafted by the Angels in the 2026 MLB draft. His cousin is Academy Award-winning Best Actress Holly Hunter. In 2012, Mike Salmon had his football jersey retired at Greenway High School in Phoenix, Arizona. He is the first and only football player to have his number retired in school history. His brother Tim is the only baseball player in the school's history to have his baseball number retired.

He lives in Newport Beach, California with his wife, Nina. Salmon serves as vice chairman of the board of directors of the Lott Trophy, an annual college football award given to a defensive player that exhibits excellence on and off the field.

Salmon received two degrees Bachelor's degree in Urban and Regional Planning and Communications from the University of Southern California, where he was a member of the Phi Delta Theta fraternity and named to the All Phi Delta Theta football team all four years he played.
