= Ernest Dixon (American football) =

American football player (born 1971)

No. 56, 58
- Position: Linebacker

Personal information
- Born: October 17, 1971 (age 55); Fort Mill, South Carolina, U.S.
- Listed height: 6 ft 1 in (1.85 m)
- Listed weight: 243 lb (110 kg)

Career information
- High school: Fort Mill (SC); Fork Union Military Academy (VA)
- College: South Carolina
- NFL draft: 1994: undrafted

Career history
- New Orleans Saints (1994–1997); Carolina Panthers (1998)*; Oakland Raiders (1998); Kansas City Chiefs (1998)
- * Offseason or practice squad member only

Awards and highlights
- First-team All-SEC (1993)

Career NFL statistics
- Games played: 66
- Tackles: 32
- Sacks: 4.5
- Interceptions: 2
- Stats at Pro Football Reference

Ernest James Dixon (born October 17, 1971) is an American former professional football player who was a linebacker for five seasons in the National Football League (NFL). After playing college football fort the South Carolina Gamecocks, he played in the NFL for the New Orleans Saints, Oakland Raiders, and Kansas City Chiefs.
