= 1996 NFL season =

American football season

Regular season
- Duration: September 1 – December 23, 1996

Playoffs
- Start date: December 28, 1996
- AFC Champions: New England Patriots
- NFC Champions: Green Bay Packers

Super Bowl XXXI
- Date: January 26, 1997
- Site: Louisiana Superdome, New Orleans, Louisiana
- Champions: Green Bay Packers

Pro Bowl
- Date: February 2, 1997
- Site: Aloha Stadium

AFC teams: West, Central, East
NFC teams: West, Central, East

The 1996 NFL season was the 77th regular season of the National Football League (NFL) and the season was marked by notable controversies from beginning to end. Most significantly, the Cleveland Browns relocation controversy resulted in a then-unique legal settlement where the Cleveland Browns franchise, history, records, and intellectual property remained in Cleveland (with the Browns officially deactivated), while its players and personnel transferred to Baltimore, technically to a new league franchise that was named the Baltimore Ravens.

The season ended with Super Bowl XXXI when the Green Bay Packers defeated the New England Patriots 35–21 at the Louisiana Superdome.

== Player movement ==
=== Retirements ===
- January 9, 1996: Rams offensive lineman Jackie Slater announced his retirement.

=== Draft ===
The 1996 NFL draft was held from April 20 to 21, 1996, at New York City's Paramount Theater. With the first pick, the New York Jets selected wide receiver Keyshawn Johnson from the University of Southern California.

== Referee changes ==
Gordon McCarter retired during the 1996 off-season. He joined the NFL in 1967, serving as a line judge and back judge, before being promoted to referee in 1974. Dale Hamer, who had to sit out the 1995 season to recover from open heart surgery, took over McCarter's officiating crew.

Future Vice President of Officiating Mike Pereira was hired as a side judge. He left the field after two seasons to join the league office and succeeded Jerry Seeman in 2001.

== Major rule changes ==
- In order to reduce injuries, hits with the helmet or to the head will be personal fouls and subject to fines.

== Preseason ==
=== American Bowl ===
A series of National Football League pre-season exhibition games that were held at sites outside the United States. Two games were contested in 1996.

Date	Winning team	Score	Losing team	Score	Stadium	City
July 28, 1996	San Diego Chargers	20	Pittsburgh Steelers	10	Tokyo Dome	(Japan) Tokyo
August 5, 1996	Kansas City Chiefs	32	Dallas Cowboys	6	Estadio Universitario	(Mexico) Monterrey

=== Hall of Fame Game ===
The Pro Football Hall of Fame Game, in which the Indianapolis Colts defeated the New Orleans Saints 10–3, was played on July 27, and held at Fawcett Stadium in Canton, Ohio, the same city where the league was founded. The 1996 Hall of Fame Class included Lou Creekmur, Dan Dierdorf, a former offensive lineman with the St. Louis Cardinals and a member of the Monday Night Football broadcast team, Joe Gibbs, a three-time Super Bowl winning coach with Washington, Charlie Joiner and Mel Renfro.

== Regular season ==
=== Scheduling formula ===
Inter-conference
AFC East vs NFC East
AFC Central vs NFC West
AFC West vs NFC Central

Highlights of the 1996 season included:

- Thanksgiving: Two games were played on Thursday, November 28, featuring Kansas City at Detroit and Washington at Dallas, with Kansas City and Dallas winning.

=== Final standings ===
AFC East
	W	L	T	PCT	PF	PA	STK
^{(2)} New England Patriots	11	5	0	.688	418	313	W1
^{(4)} Buffalo Bills	10	6	0	.625	319	266	W1
^{(6)} Indianapolis Colts	9	7	0	.563	317	334	L1
Miami Dolphins	8	8	0	.500	339	325	W2
New York Jets	1	15	0	.063	279	454	L7

AFC Central
	W	L	T	PCT	PF	PA	STK
^{(3)} Pittsburgh Steelers	10	6	0	.625	344	257	L2
^{(5)} Jacksonville Jaguars	9	7	0	.563	325	335	W5
Cincinnati Bengals	8	8	0	.500	372	369	W3
Houston Oilers	8	8	0	.500	345	319	W1
Baltimore Ravens	4	12	0	.250	371	441	L3

AFC West
	W	L	T	PCT	PF	PA	STK
^{(1)} Denver Broncos	13	3	0	.813	391	275	L1
Kansas City Chiefs	9	7	0	.563	297	300	L3
San Diego Chargers	8	8	0	.500	310	376	W1
Oakland Raiders	7	9	0	.438	340	293	L2
Seattle Seahawks	7	9	0	.438	317	376	W1

NFC East
	W	L	T	PCT	PF	PA	STK
^{(3)} Dallas Cowboys	10	6	0	.625	286	250	L1
^{(5)} Philadelphia Eagles	10	6	0	.625	363	341	W2
Washington Redskins	9	7	0	.563	364	312	W1
Arizona Cardinals	7	9	0	.438	300	397	L1
New York Giants	6	10	0	.375	242	297	L2

NFC Central
	W	L	T	PCT	PF	PA	STK
^{(1)} Green Bay Packers	13	3	0	.813	456	210	W5
^{(6)} Minnesota Vikings	9	7	0	.563	298	315	L1
Chicago Bears	7	9	0	.438	283	305	L1
Tampa Bay Buccaneers	6	10	0	.375	221	293	W1
Detroit Lions	5	11	0	.313	302	368	L5

NFC West
	W	L	T	PCT	PF	PA	STK
^{(2)} Carolina Panthers	12	4	0	.750	367	218	W7
^{(4)} San Francisco 49ers	12	4	0	.750	398	257	W2
St. Louis Rams	6	10	0	.375	303	409	W2
Atlanta Falcons	3	13	0	.188	309	461	L2
New Orleans Saints	3	13	0	.188	229	339	L1

=== Tiebreakers ===
- Jacksonville was the second AFC Wild Card ahead of Indianapolis and Kansas City based on better conference record (7–5 to Colts' 6–6 and Chiefs' 5–7).
- Indianapolis was the third AFC Wild Card based on head-to-head victory over Kansas City (1–0).
- Cincinnati finished ahead of Houston in the AFC Central based on better net division points (19 to Oilers' 11).
- Oakland finished ahead of Seattle in the AFC West based on better division record (3–5 to Seahawks' 2–6).
- Dallas finished ahead of Philadelphia in the NFC East based on better record against common opponents (7–4 to Eagles' 6–5.)
- Minnesota was the third NFC Wild Card based on better conference record than Washington (8–4 to Redskins' 6–6).
- Carolina finished ahead of San Francisco in the NFC West based on head-to-head sweep (2–0).
- Atlanta finished ahead of New Orleans in the NFC West based on head-to-head sweep (2–0).

== Playoffs ==
Dec 28 – Rich Stadium	Jan 4 – Mile High Stadium
5	Jacksonville	30
5	Jacksonville	30
4	Buffalo	27	Jan 12 – Foxboro Stadium
1	Denver	27
AFC
Dec 29 – Three Rivers Stadium	5	Jacksonville	6
Jan 5 – Foxboro Stadium
2	New England	20
6	Indianapolis	14	AFC Championship
3	Pittsburgh	3
3	Pittsburgh	42	Jan 26 – Louisiana Superdome
2	New England	28
Wild-card round
Divisional round
Dec 28 – Texas Stadium	A2	New England	21
Jan 5 – Ericsson Stadium
N1	Green Bay	35
6	Minnesota	15	Super Bowl XXXI
3	Dallas	17
3	Dallas	40	Jan 12 – Lambeau Field
2	Carolina	26
NFC
Dec 29 – 3Com Park	2	Carolina	13
Jan 4 – Lambeau Field
1	Green Bay	30
5	Philadelphia	0	NFC Championship
4	San Francisco	14
4	San Francisco	14
1	Green Bay	35

== Notable events ==
When Art Modell, owner of the Cleveland Browns, wanted to relocate his team to Baltimore in a surprise move first reported by The Boston Globe on November 4, 1995, the ensuing press furor and public relations mess forced the league to intercede and make an agreement with him and the cities of Cleveland and Baltimore before the new season began. In the agreement, the name, colors and history of the Browns were to remain in Cleveland, while the relocated club would technically be a new league franchise; the Browns would return to play in Cleveland at a new stadium no later than 1999 by way of an expansion or another franchise relocation. Either way, the Cleveland Browns would continue, officially suspended for the 1996 through 1998 seasons, while the Baltimore Ravens' history begins with the 1996 season.

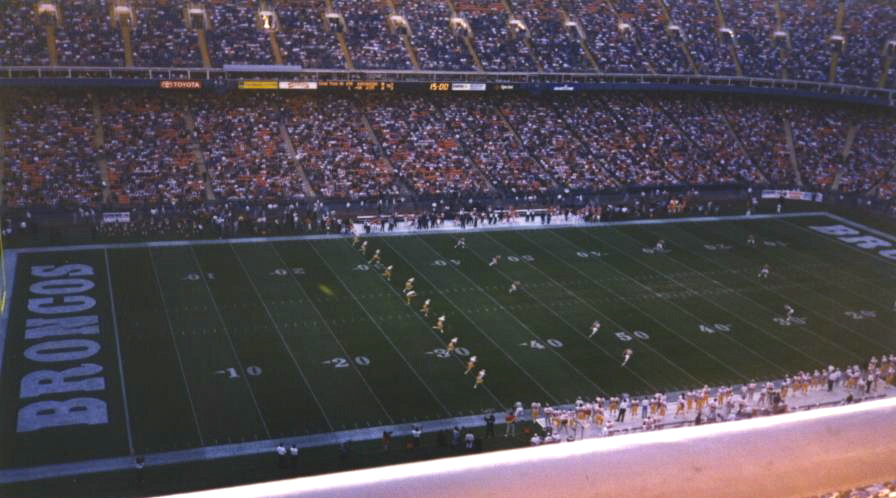
1996 AFC West champion Denver hosts Tampa Bay at Mile High Stadium, September 15, 1996

The season was also the final season for the Houston Oilers before leaving Texas for Memphis for the following season, and then to Nashville in 1998. This move left Houston with no professional football team until the 2002 debut of the Texans.

One of the most memorable aspects of the 1996 season was that the Carolina Panthers and Jacksonville Jaguars, each in just their second year of existence, both advanced to their respective conference championship games. 1996 marked the third year the NFL salary cap was in force and also marked the end of multiple "dynasties" in the NFL as it was the first season since 1991 (and only the second since 1987) in which neither the Dallas Cowboys nor the San Francisco 49ers played in the NFC Championship Game. It was also the first NFC Championship Game ever that did not feature either the Cowboys, 49ers, Washington Redskins, or Los Angeles Rams.

The season ended with Super Bowl XXXI when the Green Bay Packers defeated the New England Patriots in a game ultimately decided when a third-quarter kick-off was returned 99 yards for a touchdown by Packers' kick returner, Desmond Howard. For that, and his excellent performance on kick-off and punt returns throughout the game, Howard was named Super Bowl MVP, the first and only time that a special teams player has earned that award.

All that was nearly overshadowed by the press feeding frenzy reporting and commenting on the rumor, between the AFC championship game up to and into the broadcast coverage of Super Bowl XXXI itself, that iconic coach Bill Parcells was planning on breaking his contract with the New England Patriots because he did not get along well with owner Robert Kraft, who had helped turn around New England's image after years of ownership that was either dismal or absent. In the event, Parcells did not even return with the players, and telephone records showed he was talking to the Jets in the days before and the day of the Super Bowl itself. This documentary evidence led to the league awarding the Patriots multiple draft picks in compensation for the "tampering" by the Jets, which is but a continuation of one-upmanship that has gone on for years between the heated rivals.

== Statistical leaders ==
=== Team ===
Points scored	Green Bay Packers (456)
Total yards gained	Denver Broncos (5,791)
Yards rushing	Denver Broncos (2,362)
Yards passing	Jacksonville Jaguars (4,110)
Fewest points allowed	Green Bay Packers (210)
Fewest total yards allowed	Green Bay Packers (4,156)
Fewest rushing yards allowed	Denver Broncos (1,331)
Fewest passing yards allowed	Green Bay Packers (2,740)

=== Individual ===
Scoring	John Kasay, Carolina (145 points)
Touchdowns	Terry Allen, Washington (21 TDs)
Most field goals made	John Kasay, Carolina (37 FGs)
Rushing	Barry Sanders, Detroit (1,553 yards)
Passing	Steve Young, San Francisco (97.2 rating)
Passing touchdowns	Brett Favre, Green Bay (39 TDs)
Pass receiving	Jerry Rice, San Francisco (108 catches)
Pass receiving yards	Isaac Bruce, St. Louis (1,338)
Punt returns	Desmond Howard, Green Bay (15.1 average yards)
Kickoff returns	Michael Bates, Carolina (30.2 average yards)
Interceptions	Tyrone Braxton, Denver and Keith Lyle, St. Louis (9)
Punting	John Kidd, Miami (46.3 average yards)
Sacks	Kevin Greene, Carolina (14.5)

== Awards ==
Most Valuable Player	Brett Favre, quarterback, Green Bay
Coach of the Year	Dom Capers, Carolina
Offensive Player of the Year	Terrell Davis, running back, Denver
Defensive Player of the Year	Bruce Smith, defensive end, Buffalo
Offensive Rookie of the Year	Eddie George, running back, Houston
Defensive Rookie of the Year	Simeon Rice, defensive end, Arizona
Comeback Player of the Year	Jerome Bettis, running back, Pittsburgh
NFL Man of the Year Award	Darrell Green, cornerback, Washington
Super Bowl Most Valuable Player	Desmond Howard, return specialist, Green Bay

== Coaching changes ==
=== Off-season ===
- Arizona Cardinals – Vince Tobin new head coach. Replaced Buddy Ryan, who was fired after the 1995 season.
- Baltimore Ravens – Ted Marchibroda new head coach. Replaced Bill Belichick, who was fired in February 1996 shortly after the franchise was officially formed following the Cleveland Browns relocation controversy.
- Indianapolis Colts – Lindy Infante new head coach. Replaced Ted Marchibroda who was offered a job from the Baltimore Ravens.
- Miami Dolphins – Jimmy Johnson new head coach. Replaced Don Shula who retired after the 1995 season.
- Tampa Bay Buccaneers – Tony Dungy new head coach. Replaced Sam Wyche who was fired after the 1995 season.

=== In-season ===
- Cincinnati Bengals – Dave Shula was fired by mid season and was replaced by interim head coach Bruce Coslet.
- New Orleans Saints – Jim Mora resigned at mid season and was replaced by interim head coach Rick Venturi.

== Stadium changes ==
- Baltimore Ravens: The new Ravens team moved into Baltimore's Memorial Stadium
- Carolina Panthers: The Panthers moved from Memorial Stadium in Clemson, South Carolina to Ericsson Stadium in Charlotte, North Carolina, with the telecommunications company Ericsson acquiring the naming rights
- Cincinnati Bengals: Riverfront Stadium was renamed Cinergy Field after the energy company Cinergy acquires the naming rights
- Miami Dolphins: Joe Robbie Stadium was renamed Pro Player Stadium after Pro Player, the sports apparel division of Fruit of the Loom, acquired the naming rights
- Tampa Bay Buccaneers: Tampa Stadium was renamed Houlihan's Stadium after the Houlihan's restaurant chain acquired the naming rights

== Uniform changes ==
- The Arizona Cardinals modified their white jerseys, removing the black trim from numbers, removing the Cardinals logo from the sleeves, and moving the Arizona state flag above the sleeve stripes to where the logo was; the striping was truncated to one thin stripe with the flag above it. The striping on the white jerseys and socks worn with those jerseys changed to a wide red stripe surrounded by narrow copper and blue stripes to match the colors of the state flag.
- On June 5th 1996 The inaugural Baltimore Ravens uniforms featured purple jerseys with white numbers trimmed in black and gold at home, and white jerseys with purple numbers trimmed in black and white on the road. Black pants worn with both jerseys. The team's original logo featured raven wings outspread from a shield displaying a letter "B".
- The Dallas Cowboys introduced new blue jerseys with white lettering and numbers, and placed their star logo upon the sleeve stripes.
- The Minnesota Vikings added their Norseman logo to the jersey sleeves, in addition to paring down the sleeve striping on the purple jersey. This moved the TV numbers from the sleeves to the shoulders.
- The New Orleans Saints switched to gold numbers on both their black and white jerseys, similar to their original 1960s design. The secondary logo on the jersey sleeves, that featured and outline of the state of Louisiana, was replaced with another fleur-de-lis.
- On February 5th 1996 The Philadelphia Eagles introduced new uniforms, changing their primary color from kelly green to a darker shade described as "midnight green". The gray pants were replaced by white pants with the green jerseys, and green pants with the white jerseys. A new logo featuring a white eagle head with silver and black accents was placed on the green jersey sleeves, and the eagle wings on the helmets were redesigned to match.
- On February 11th 1996 The San Francisco 49ers introduced new uniforms featuring a darker shade of red, a black dropshadow effect added to the numbers, and switching from gold to white pants.

== Television ==
This was the third year under the league's four-year broadcast contracts with ABC, Fox, NBC, TNT, and ESPN. ABC, Fox, and NBC continued to televise Monday Night Football, the NFC package, the AFC package, respectively. Sunday night games aired on TNT during the first half of the season, and ESPN during the second half of the season.

With Jimmy Johnson leaving Fox NFL Sunday to become the head coach of the Miami Dolphins, Ronnie Lott was brought in to replace him.

Cris Collinsworth replaced Joe Montana as one of the analysts on The NFL on NBC pregame show, alongside Greg Gumbel, Mike Ditka, and Joe Gibbs.
