= 1991 New York Giants season =

NFL team season

- Owner: Wellington Mara; Robert Tisch
- General manager: George Young
- Head coach: Ray Handley
- Home stadium: Giants Stadium

Results
- Record: 8–8
- Division place: 4th NFC East
- Playoffs: Did not qualify
- Pro Bowlers: C Bart Oates

The 1991 New York Giants season was the franchise's 67th season in the National Football League (NFL) and the first under head coach Ray Handley. The Giants entered the season as the defending Super Bowl champion but failed to qualify for the playoffs; this marked the eighth time in NFL history that a team had failed to make the playoffs the season after winning the Super Bowl and the first since the 1988 Washington Redskins. The Giants became the first team to accomplish this feat twice, as they had missed the playoffs after winning Super Bowl XXI. Since then, there have been nine further instances of teams missing the playoffs after winning, with the 2012 Giants being one of them; they are one of only two teams to have done this three times, along with the Pittsburgh Steelers.

The 1991 season marked the first season that the Mara family did not have total ownership of the Giants. Wellington Mara's nephew Tim, who had inherited the half-stake in the team that his grandfather and namesake had given to Tim's father Jack, decided that he no longer wanted to be involved with the team after 26 years, most of which had been spent feuding with his uncle over the team's operations. On February 2, 1991, shortly after Super Bowl XXV, Tim Mara announced he had sold his family's stake in the team to businessman Bob Tisch, the co-founder of Loews Corporation and former United States Postmaster General. Tisch did not take an active role in the operations of the team, instead choosing to focus on the team's finances; this enabled the Maras to keep control of the football side of the team and allowed Wellington Mara's son John to take a more active role with the Giants.

The 1991 season also saw major changes to the Giants' coaching staff. Defensive coordinator Bill Belichick left the team to become the head coach of the Cleveland Browns shortly after the Super Bowl. Head coach Bill Parcells retired in May and was replaced by the team's former running backs coach Ray Handley.

During the Giants' previous season Phil Simms entered the year as the starter and started the first fourteen games of the season. In the course of that fourteenth game, where the Giants hosted the Buffalo Bills, Simms suffered a severe foot injury and backup Jeff Hostetler took over and led the Giants through the playoffs and to their Super Bowl victory over those same Bills.

Simms did recover from his injury and was expected to regain his starting position, but Handley decided to make Simms and Hostetler compete for the position. Handley made his decision prior to the Giants' week one matchup with the San Francisco 49ers on Monday Night Football and gave the starting job to Hostetler amid some controversy. Hostetler led the Giants to 6 wins in his eleven starts, but broke his back during a week 13 win against Tampa Bay. Simms returned to finish the game, but went 2–3 as Giants starter the remainder of the year and the Giants fell out of the playoffs.

== Offseason ==
After the 1990 season, in which the Giants won the Super Bowl, the Giants lost several members of their coaching staff. In addition to Parcells and Belichick, wide receivers coach Tom Coughlin took the head coaching position Boston College; he was said to have been the first choice to replace Parcells and would have done so had he not left the Giants.

=== NFL draft ===
1991 New York Giants draft
Round	Pick	Player	Position	College	Notes
1	27	Jarrod Bunch	RB	Michigan	
2	55	Kanavis McGhee	LB	Colorado	
3	83	Ed McCaffrey *	WR	Stanford	
4	111	Clarence Jones	T	Maryland	
5	139	Anthony Moss	LB	Florida State	
6	167	Corey Miller	LB	South Carolina	
7	195	Simmie Carter	DB	Southern Miss	
8	223	Lamar McGriggs	DB	Western Illinois	
9	250	Jerry Bouldin	WR	Mississippi State	
10	278	Luis Cristobal	G	Miami	
11	306	Ted Popson	TE	Portland State	
12	334	Larry Wanke	QB	John Carroll	
Made roster † Pro Football Hall of Fame * Made at least one Pro Bowl during career

== Roster ==
1991 New York Giants roster
Quarterbacks (QB): 6 Matt Cavanaugh; 11 Phil Simms; Running backs (RB): 24 Ottis Anderson; 33 Jarrod Bunch FB; 44 Maurice Carthon FB; 27 Rodney Hampton KR; 30 Dave Meggett; 34 Lewis Tillman; Wide receivers (WR): 85 Stephen Baker; 82 Mark Ingram; 81 Ed McCaffrey; 86 James Milling; 83 Odessa Turner; Tight ends (TE): 87 Howard Cross; 84 Zeke Mowatt	Offensive linemen (OL): 76 Jumbo Elliott T; 68 Clarence Jones T; 61 Bob Kratch G; 60 Eric Moore G; 65 Bart Oates C; 72 Doug Riesenberg T; 66 William Roberts G; 59 Brian Williams C; Defensive linemen (DL): 77 Eric Dorsey DE; 93 Mike Fox DE; 75 Lorenzo Freeman NT; 74 Erik Howard NT; 70 Leonard Marshall DE	Linebackers (LB): 51 Bobby Abrams OLB; 58 Carl Banks OLB; 99 Steve DeOssie ILB; 52 Pepper Johnson ILB; 96 Kanavis McGhee OLB; 57 Corey Miller OLB; 55 Gary Reasons ILB; 56 Lawrence Taylor OLB; Defensive backs (DB): 46 Roger Brown CB; 25 Mark Collins CB; 29 Myron Guyton FS; 47 Greg Jackson SS; 38 Lamar McGriggs SS; 21 Reyna Thompson CB; 28 Everson Walls CB; 36 Adrian White FS; 23 Perry Williams SS; Special teams (ST): 9 Matt Bahr K; 5 Sean Landeta P	Practice squad: 92 Murray Garrett DT; 67 Jeff Novak T; 88 Joey Smith WR; Reserve: 62 Jay Butler T (IR); -- Tim Downing DE (IR); 15 Jeff Hostetler QB (IR); 79 Clint James DE (IR); 49 Thom Kaumeyer S (IR); 54 Anthony Moss LB (IR); 18 Greg Taylor WR (IR); 73 John Washington NT (IR); Rookies in italics 47 active, 8 reserve, 3 practice squad

== Preseason ==
Week	Date	Opponent	Result	Record	Venue
1	August 5	Buffalo Bills	W 23–17	1–0	Giants Stadium
2	August 10	at Cleveland Browns	L 10–16	1–1	Cleveland Municipal Stadium
3	August 17	New York Jets	W 24–10	2–1	Giants Stadium
4	August 24	at New England Patriots	L 3–24	2–2	Foxboro Stadium

== Regular season ==
=== Schedule ===
Week	Date	Opponent	Result	Record	Venue	Recap
1	September 2	San Francisco 49ers	**W** 16–14	1–0	Giants Stadium	Recap
2	September 8	Los Angeles Rams	**L** 13–19	1–1	Giants Stadium	Recap
3	September 15	at Chicago Bears	**L** 17–20	1–2	Soldier Field	Recap
4	September 22	Cleveland Browns	**W** 13–10	2–2	Giants Stadium	Recap
5	September 29	at **Dallas Cowboys**	**L** 16–21	2–3	Texas Stadium	Recap
6	October 6	**Phoenix Cardinals**	**W** 20–9	3–3	Giants Stadium	Recap
7	October 14	at Pittsburgh Steelers	**W** 23–20	4–3	Three Rivers Stadium	Recap
8	Bye					
9	October 27	**Washington Redskins**	**L** 13–17	4–4	Giants Stadium	Recap
10	November 4	at **Philadelphia Eagles**	**L** 7–30	4–5	Veterans Stadium	Recap
11	November 10	at **Phoenix Cardinals**	**W** 21–14	5–5	Sun Devil Stadium	Recap
12	November 17	**Dallas Cowboys**	**W** 22–9	6–5	Giants Stadium	Recap
13	November 24	at Tampa Bay Buccaneers	**W** 21–14	7–5	Tampa Stadium	Recap
14	December 1	at Cincinnati Bengals	**L** 24–27	7–6	Riverfront Stadium	Recap
15	December 8	**Philadelphia Eagles**	**L** 14–19	7–7	Giants Stadium	Recap
16	December 15	at **Washington Redskins**	**L** 17–34	7–8	RFK Stadium	Recap
17	December 21	Houston Oilers	**W** 24–20	8–8	Giants Stadium	Recap
Note: Intra-division opponents are in **bold** text.

=== Game summaries ===
==== Week 1: vs. San Francisco 49ers ====
Week 1: San Francisco 49ers at New York Giants – Game summary

Quarter	1	2	3	4	Total
49ers	7	0	0	7	**14**
**Giants**	3	10	0	3	**16**

at Giants Stadium, East Rutherford, New Jersey

- Date: September 2
- Game time: 9:00 p.m. EDT
- Game weather: Clear, 65 °F (18 °C)
- Game attendance: 76,319
- Referee: Dale Hamer
- TV announcers (ABC): Al Michaels, Frank Gifford and Dan Dierdorf

Game information

**First quarter**

- NYG – Matt Bahr 35-yard field goal, 6:46. Giants 3–0.
- SF – Jerry Rice 73-yard pass from Steve Young (Mike Cofer kick), 2:44. 49ers 7–3.

**Second quarter**

- NYG – Ottis Anderson 1-yard run (Matt Bahr kick), 10:05. Giants 10–7.
- NYG – Matt Bahr 28-yard field goal, 0:00. Giants 13–7.

**Third quarter**

- No scoring plays.

**Fourth quarter**

- SF – Steve Young 5-yard run (Mike Cofer kick), 13:37. 49ers 14–13.
- NYG – Matt Bahr 35-yard field goal, 0:05. Giants 16–14.

**Top passers**

- SF – Steve Young – 12/22, 162 yards, TD, INT
- NYG – Jeff Hostetler – 17/31, 228 yards

**Top rushers**

- SF – Keith Henderson – 10 rushes, 46 yards
- NYG – Ottis Anderson – 15 rushes, 45 yards, TD

**Top receivers**

- SF – Jerry Rice – 1 reception, 73 yards, TD
- NYG – Mark Ingram – 6 receptions, 76 yards

==== Week 2: vs. Los Angeles Rams ====
Week 2: Los Angeles Rams at New York Giants – Game summary

Quarter	1	2	3	4	Total
**Rams**	0	10	3	6	**19**
Giants	0	6	0	7	**13**

at Giants Stadium, East Rutherford, New Jersey

- Date: September 8
- Game time: 1:00 p.m. EDT
- Game weather: Scattered clouds, 78 °F (26 °C)
- Game attendance: 76,541
- Referee: Johnny Grier
- TV announcers (CBS): Verne Lundquist and John Madden

Game information

**First quarter**

- No scoring plays.

**Second quarter**

- LA – Tony Zendejas 29-yard field goal, 14:48. Rams 3–0.
- NYG – Matt Bahr 46-yard field goal, 9:18. Tied 3–3.
- LA – Robert Delpino 1-yard run (Tony Zendejas kick), 3:58. Rams 10–3.
- NYG – Matt Bahr 40-yard field goal, 0:07. Rams 10–6.

**Third quarter**

- LA – Tony Zendejas 50-yard field goal, 9:29. Rams 13–6.

**Fourth quarter**

- LA – Tony Zendejas 32-yard field goal, 10:37. Rams 16–6.
- LA – Tony Zendejas 33-yard field goal, 3:08. Rams 19–6.
- NYG – Dave Meggett 1-yard pass from Jeff Hostetler (Matt Bahr kick), 1:52. Rams 19–13.

**Top passers**

- LA – Jim Everett – 7/16, 83 yards
- NYG – Jeff Hostetler – 17/32, 187 yards, TD, INT

**Top rushers**

- LA – Robert Delpino – 27 rushes, 116 yards, TD
- NYG – Lewis Tillman – 8 rushes, 42 yards

**Top receivers**

- LA – Damone Johnson – 1 reception, 18 yards
- NYG – Odessa Turner – 3 receptions, 47 yards

==== Week 3: at Chicago Bears ====
Week 3: New York Giants at Chicago Bears – Game summary

Quarter	1	2	3	4	Total
Giants	0	0	10	7	**17**
**Bears**	0	13	0	7	**20**

at Soldier Field, Chicago, Illinois

- Date: September 15
- Game time: 1:00 p.m. EDT/12:00 p.m. CDT
- Game weather: Mostly cloudy, 82 °F (28 °C)
- Game attendance: 64,829
- Referee: Dick Hantak
- TV announcers (CBS): Pat Summerall and John Madden

Game information

**First quarter**

- No scoring plays.

**Second quarter**

- CHI – Kevin Butler 46-yard field goal, 6:54. Bears 3–0.
- CHI – Wendell Davis 75-yard pass from Jim Harbaugh (Kevin Butler kick), 0:55. Bears 10–0.
- CHI – Kevin Butler 20-yard field goal, 0:00. Bears 13–0.

**Third quarter**

- NYG – Matt Bahr 35-yard field goal, 13:23. Bears 13–3.
- NYG – Rodney Hampton 6-yard run (Matt Bahr kick), 1:17. Bears 13–10.

**Fourth quarter**

- NYG – Rodney Hampton 3-yard run (Matt Bahr kick), 10:09. Giants 17–13.
- CHI – Neal Anderson 42-yard run (Kevin Butler kick), 6:39. Bears 20–17.

**Top passers**

- NYG – Jeff Hostetler – 25/35, 209 yards, INT
- CHI – Jim Harbaugh – 15/25, 221 yards, TD, INT

**Top rushers**

- NYG – Rodney Hampton – 15 rushes, 61 yards, 2 TD
- CHI – Neal Anderson – 8 rushes, 57 yards, TD

**Top receivers**

- NYG – Rodney Hampton – 6 receptions, 46 yards
- CHI – Wendell Davis – 2 receptions, 88 yards, TD

==== Week 4: vs. Cleveland Browns ====
Week 4: Cleveland Browns at New York Giants – Game summary

Quarter	1	2	3	4	Total
Browns	0	0	3	7	**10**
**Giants**	3	10	0	0	**13**

at Giants Stadium, East Rutherford, New Jersey

- Date: September 22
- Game time: 1:00 p.m. EDT
- Game weather: Scattered clouds, 61 °F (16 °C)
- Game attendance: 75,891
- Referee: Tom White
- TV announcers (NBC): Charlie Jones and Todd Christensen

Game information

**First quarter**

- NYG – Matt Bahr 44-yard field goal, 1:04. Giants 3–0.

**Second quarter**

- NYG – Matt Bahr 48-yard field goal, 11:10. Giants 6–0.
- NYG – Rodney Hampton 28-yard run (Matt Bahr kick), 3:33. Giants 13–0.

**Third quarter**

- CLE – Matt Stover 30-yard field goal, 4:13. Giants 13–3.

**Fourth quarter**

- CLE – Kevin Mack 7-yard pass from Bernie Kosar (Matt Stover kick), 14:55. Giants 13–10.

**Top passers**

- CLE – Bernie Kosar – 13/22, 107 yards, TD
- NYG – Jeff Hostetler – 9/15, 65 yards

**Top rushers**

- CLE – Kevin Mack – 20 rushes, 71 yards
- NYG – Rodney Hampton – 17 rushes, 104 yards, TD

**Top receivers**

- CLE – Webster Slaughter – 3 receptions, 41 yards
- NYG – Rodney Hampton – 4 receptions, 21 yards

==== Week 5: at Dallas Cowboys ====
Week 5: New York Giants at Dallas Cowboys – Game summary

Quarter	1	2	3	4	Total
Giants	0	3	3	10	**16**
**Cowboys**	0	7	7	7	**21**

at Texas Stadium, Irving, Texas

- Date: September 29
- Game time: 1:00 p.m. EDT/12:00 p.m. CDT
- Game weather: Cloudy, 66 °F (19 °C)
- Game attendance: 64,010
- Referee: Pat Haggerty
- TV announcers (CBS): Verne Lundquist and Dan Fouts

Game information

**First quarter**

- No scoring plays.

**Second quarter**

- NYG – Matt Bahr 43-yard field goal, 5:43. Giants 3–0.
- DAL – Emmitt Smith 3-yard run (Ken Willis kick), 1:13. Cowboys 7–3.

**Third quarter**

- DAL – Ray Horton 20-yard fumble return (Ken Willis kick), 14:42. Cowboys 14–3.
- NYG – Matt Bahr 29-yard field goal, 9:12. Cowboys 14–6.

**Fourth quarter**

- NYG – Matt Bahr 25-yard field goal, 11:12. Cowboys 14–9.
- NYG – Stephen Baker 19-yard pass from Jeff Hostetler (Matt Bahr kick), 5:41. Giants 16–14.
- DAL – Michael Irvin 23-yard pass from Troy Aikman (Ken Willis kick), 2:13. Cowboys 21–16.

**Top passers**

- NYG – Jeff Hostetler – 28/34, 368 yards, TD, INT
- DAL – Troy Aikman – 20/27, 277 yards, TD

**Top rushers**

- NYG – Rodney Hampton – 11 rushes, 46 yards
- DAL – Emmitt Smith – 18 rushes, 67 yards, 2 TD

**Top receivers**

- NYG – Mark Ingram – 6 receptions, 142 yards
- DAL – Michael Irvin – 6 receptions, 91 yards

==== Week 6: vs. Phoenix Cardinals ====
Week 6: Phoenix Cardinals at New York Giants – Game summary

Quarter	1	2	3	4	Total
Cardinals	3	0	6	0	**9**
**Giants**	14	3	0	3	**20**

at Giants Stadium, East Rutherford, New Jersey

- Date: October 6
- Game time: 4:00 p.m. EDT
- Game weather: Light rain, 64 °F (18 °C)
- Game attendance: 75,891
- Referee: Bob McElwee
- TV announcers (CBS): Verne Lundquist and Dan Fouts

Game information

**First quarter**

- NYG – Rodney Hampton 12-yard run (Matt Bahr kick), 10:42. Giants 7–0.
- PHO – Greg Davis 52-yard field goal, 6:20. Giants 7–3.
- NYG – Zeke Mowatt 7-yard pass from Jeff Hostetler (Matt Bahr kick), 0:52. Giants 14–3.

**Second quarter**

- NYG – Matt Bahr 42-yard field goal, 4:19. Giants 17–3.

**Third quarter**

- PHO – Greg Davis 40-yard field goal, 11:32. Giants 17–6.
- PHO – Greg Davis 29-yard field goal, 2:09. Giants 17–9.

**Fourth quarter**

- NYG – Matt Bahr 27-yard field goal, 10:40. Giants 20–9.

**Top passers**

- PHO – Tom Tupa – 23/40, 230 yards, 2 INT
- NYG – Jeff Hostetler – 14/18, 200 yards, TD

**Top rushers**

- PHO – Johnny Johnson – 14 rushes, 73 yards
- NYG – Rodney Hampton – 22 rushes, 137 yards, TD

**Top receivers**

- PHO – Randal Hill – 6 receptions, 65 yards
- NYG – Odessa Turner – 3 receptions, 46 yards

==== Week 7: at Pittsburgh Steelers ====
Week 7: New York Giants at Pittsburgh Steelers – Game summary

Quarter	1	2	3	4	Total
**Giants**	7	6	7	3	**23**
Steelers	0	0	3	17	**20**

at Three Rivers Stadium, Pittsburgh, Pennsylvania

- Date: October 14
- Game time: 9:00 p.m. EDT
- Game weather: Mostly cloudy, 47 °F (8 °C)
- Game attendance: 57,608
- Referee: Red Cashion
- TV announcers (ABC): Al Michaels, Frank Gifford and Dan Dierdorf

Game information

**First quarter**

- NYG – Howard Cross 12-yard pass from Jeff Hostetler (Matt Bahr kick) kick), 3:59. Giants 7–0.

**Second quarter**

- NYG – Matt Bahr 45-yard field goal, 13:41. Giants 10–0.
- NYG – Matt Bahr 40-yard field goal, 9:01. Giants 13–0.

**Third quarter**

- NYG – Dave Meggett 30-yard run (Matt Bahr kick), 7:13. Giants 20–0.
- PIT – Gary Anderson 26-yard field goal, 3:06. Giants 20–3.

**Fourth quarter**

- PIT – Gary Anderson 39-yard field goal, 10:19. Giants 20–6.
- PIT – Louis Lipps 16-yard pass from Neil O'Donnell (Gary Anderson kick), 4:37. Giants 20–13.
- PIT – Eric Green 5-yard pass from Neil O'Donnell (Gary Anderson kick), 0:50. Tied 20–20.
- NYG – Matt Bahr 44-yard field goal, 0:04. Giants 23–20.

**Top passers**

- NYG – Jeff Hostetler – 14/25, 116 yards, TD
- PIT – Neil O'Donnell – 11/21, 152 yards, 2 TD

**Top rushers**

- NYG – Rodney Hampton – 25 rushes, 96 yards
- PIT – Merrill Hoge – 8 rushes, 73 yards

**Top receivers**

- NYG – Dave Meggett – 4 receptions, 34 yards
- PIT – Dwight Stone – 2 receptions, 78 yards

With the win, the Giants improved to 4-3. However, they would end up being the last team to win in Pittsburgh on Monday night until the 2025 Houston Texans as the rest of the league would have 23 game losing streak in Pittsburgh on Monday night.

==== Week 9: vs. Washington Redskins ====
Week 9: Washington Redskins at New York Giants – Game summary

Quarter	1	2	3	4	Total
**Redskins**	0	0	7	10	**17**
Giants	10	3	0	0	**13**

at Giants Stadium, East Rutherford, New Jersey

- Date: October 27
- Game time: 7:30 p.m. EST
- Game weather: Scattered clouds, 64 °F (18 °C)
- Game attendance: 76,627
- Referee: Jerry Markbreit
- TV announcers (ESPN): Mike Patrick and Joe Theismann

Game information

**First quarter**

- NYG – Raúl Allegre 23-yard field goal, 8:35. Giants 3–0.
- NYG – Rodney Hampton 1-yard run (Raúl Allegre kick), 1:20. Giants 10–0.

**Second quarter**

- NYG – Raúl Allegre 36-yard field goal, 1:40. Giants 13–0.

**Third quarter**

- WAS – Gary Clark 7-yard pass from Mark Rypien (Chip Lohmiller kick), 0:42. Giants 13–7.

**Fourth quarter**

- WAS – Gary Clark 54-yard pass from Mark Rypien (Chip Lohmiller kick), 12:50. Redskins 14–13.
- WAS – Chip Lohmiller 35-yard field goal, 0:51. Redskins 17–13.

**Top passers**

- WAS – Mark Rypien – 12/25, 159 yards, 2 TD, INT
- NYG – Jeff Hostetler – 14/21, 137 yards, INT

**Top rushers**

- WAS – Ricky Ervins – 20 rushes, 82 yards
- NYG – Rodney Hampton – 21 rushes, 83 yards, TD

**Top receivers**

- WAS – Gary Clark – 3 receptions, 70 yards, 2 TD
- NYG – Stephen Baker – 3 receptions, 77 yards

==== Week 10: at Philadelphia Eagles ====
Week 10: New York Giants at Philadelphia Eagles – Game summary

Quarter	1	2	3	4	Total
Giants	0	0	7	0	**7**
**Eagles**	0	13	7	10	**30**

at Veterans Stadium, Philadelphia, Pennsylvania

- Date: November 4
- Game time: 9:00 p.m. EST
- Game weather: Mostly cloudy, 42 °F (6 °C)
- Game attendance: 65,816
- Referee: Johnny Grier
- TV announcers (ABC): Al Michaels, Frank Gifford and Dan Dierdorf

Game information

**First quarter**

- No scoring plays.

**Second quarter**

- PHI – Roger Ruzek 38-yard field goal, 14:09. Eagles 3–0.
- PHI – Keith Jackson 73-yard pass from Jim McMahon (Roger Ruzek kick), 7:23. Eagles 10–0.
- PHI – Roger Ruzek 36-yard field goal, 4:26. Eagles 13–0.

**Third quarter**

- PHI – James Joseph 11-yard run (Roger Ruzek kick), 4:04. Eagles 20–0.
- NYG – Rodney Hampton 1-yard run (Raúl Allegre kick), 2:21. Eagles 20–7.

**Fourth quarter**

- PHI – Roger Ruzek 25-yard field goal, 8:13. Eagles 23–7.
- PHI – James Joseph 1-yard run (Roger Ruzek kick), 3:19. Eagles 30–7.

**Top passers**

- NYG – Jeff Hostetler – 9/17, 142 yards
- PHI – Jim McMahon – 16/26, 229 yards, TD

**Top rushers**

- NYG – Rodney Hampton – 11 rushes, 54 yards, TD
- PHI – James Joseph – 18 rushes, 68 yards, 2 TD

**Top receivers**

- NYG – Odessa Turner – 1 reception, 55 yards
- PHI – Keith Jackson – 4 receptions, 88 yards, TD

==== Week 11: at Phoenix Cardinals ====
Week 11: New York Giants at Phoenix Cardinals – Game summary

Quarter	1	2	3	4	Total
**Giants**	7	7	7	0	**21**
Cardinals	0	7	0	7	**14**

at Sun Devil Stadium, Tempe, Arizona

- Date: November 10
- Game time: 4:00 p.m. EST/2:00 p.m. MST
- Game weather: Overcast, 74 °F (23 °C)
- Game attendance: 50,048
- Referee: Gerry Austin
- TV announcers (CBS): Dick Stockton and Merlin Olsen

Game information

**First quarter**

- NYG – Jeff Hostetler 47-yard run (Raúl Allegre kick), 1:34. Giants 7–0.

**Second quarter**

- NYG – Rodney Hampton 1-yard run (Raúl Allegre kick), 12:50. Giants 14–0.
- PHO – Johnny Johnson 3-yard run (Greg Davis kick), 3:12. Giants 14–7.

**Third quarter**

- NYG – Jeff Hostetler 4-yard run (Raúl Allegre kick), 3:46. Giants 21–7.

**Fourth quarter**

- PHO – Ricky Proehl 34-yard pass from Stan Gelbaugh (Greg Davis kick), 2:34. Giants 21–14.

**Top passers**

- NYG – Jeff Hostetler – 12/21, 124 yards
- PHO – Tom Tupa – 15/25, 175 yards, INT

**Top rushers**

- NYG – Rodney Hampton – 24 rushes, 99 yards, TD
- PHO – Johnny Johnson – 14 rushes, 37 yards, TD

**Top receivers**

- NYG – Mark Ingram – 3 receptions, 46 yards
- PHO – Ernie Jones – 5 receptions, 99 yards

==== Week 12: vs. Dallas Cowboys ====
Week 12: Dallas Cowboys at New York Giants – Game summary

Quarter	1	2	3	4	Total
Cowboys	0	3	6	0	**9**
**Giants**	6	10	0	6	**22**

at Giants Stadium, East Rutherford, New Jersey

- Date: November 17
- Game time: 4:00 p.m. EST
- Game weather: Partly sunny, 41 °F (5 °C)
- Game attendance: 76,410
- Referee: Gordon McCarter
- TV announcers (CBS): Pat Summerall and John Madden

Game information

**First quarter**

- NYG – Matt Bahr 27-yard field goal, 4:15. Giants 3–0.
- NYG – Matt Bahr 37-yard field goal, 2:15. Giants 6–0.

**Second quarter**

- DAL – Ken Willis 22-yard field goal, 10:07. Giants 6–3.
- NYG – Rodney Hampton 1-yard run (Matt Bahr kick), 3:30. Giants 13–3.
- NYG – Matt Bahr 22-yard field goal, 0:39. Giants 16–3.

**Third quarter**

- DAL – Ken Willis 31-yard field goal, 8:41. Giants 16–6.
- DAL – Ken Willis 18-yard field goal, 1:15. Giants 16–9.

**Fourth quarter**

- NYG – Mark Ingram 35-yard pass from Jeff Hostetler (kick failed), 10:08. Giants 22–9.

**Top passers**

- DAL – Troy Aikman – 16/25, 150 yards
- NYG – Jeff Hostetler – 14/22, 182 yards, TD

**Top rushers**

- DAL – Emmitt Smith – 17 rushes, 97 yards
- NYG – Lewis Tillman – 12 rushes, 63 yards

**Top receivers**

- DAL – Michael Irvin – 3 receptions, 48 yards
- NYG – Stephen Baker – 4 receptions, 64 yards

==== Week 13: at Tampa Bay Buccaneers ====
Week 13: New York Giants at Tampa Bay Buccaneers – Game summary

Quarter	1	2	3	4	Total
**Giants**	7	0	7	7	**21**
Buccaneers	0	7	0	7	**14**

at Tampa Stadium, Tampa, Florida

- Date: November 24
- Game time: 1:00 p.m. EST
- Game weather: Cloudy, 60 °F (16 °C)
- Game attendance: 63,698
- Referee: Dale Hamer
- TV announcers (CBS): Verne Lundquist and Dan Fouts

Game information

**First quarter**

- NYG – Dave Meggett 70-yard punt return (Matt Bahr kick), 10:10. Giants 7–0.

**Second quarter**

- TB – Reggie Cobb 27-yard run (Steve Christie kick), 14:53. Tied 7–7.

**Third quarter**

- NYG – Rodney Hampton 5-yard run (Matt Bahr kick), 8:50. Giants 14–7.

**Fourth quarter**

- TB – Willie Drewrey 19-yard pass from Vinny Testaverde (Steve Christie kick), 5:59. Tied 14–14.
- NYG – Stephen Baker 30-yard pass from Phil Simms (Matt Bahr kick), 0:16. Giants 21–14.

**Top passers**

- NYG – Phil Simms – 10/14, 100 yards, TD
- TB – Vinny Testaverde – 16/27, 122 yards, TD, 2 INT

**Top rushers**

- NYG – Rodney Hampton – 15 rushes, 44 yards, TD
- TB – Reggie Cobb – 22 rushes, 110 yards, TD

**Top receivers**

- NYG – Mark Ingram – 3 receptions, 56 yards
- TB – Willie Drewrey – 5 receptions, 57 yards, TD

==== Week 14: at Cincinnati Bengals ====
Week 14: New York Giants at Cincinnati Bengals – Game summary

Quarter	1	2	3	4	Total
Giants	7	7	3	7	**24**
**Bengals**	7	0	3	17	**27**

at Riverfront Stadium, Cincinnati, Ohio

- Date: December 1
- Game time: 4:00 p.m. EST
- Game weather: Overcast, 39 °F (4 °C)
- Game attendance: 45,063
- Referee: Howard Roe
- TV announcers (CBS): Pat Summerall and John Madden

Game information

**First quarter**

- NYG – Stephen Baker 15-yard pass from Phil Simms (Matt Bahr kick), 5:55. Giants 7–0.
- CIN – Tim McGee 41-yard pass from Boomer Esiason (Jim Breech kick), 0:36. Tied 7–7.

**Second quarter**

- NYG – Stephen Baker 13-yard pass from Phil Simms (Matt Bahr kick), 12:49. Giants 14–7.

**Third quarter**

- NYG – Matt Bahr 37-yard field goal, 10:12. Giants 17–7.
- CIN – Jim Breech 35-yard field goal, 4:55. Giants 17–10.

**Fourth quarter**

- CIN – Harold Green 1-yard run (Jim Breech kick), 11:15. Tied 17–17.
- CIN – Jim Breech 35-yard field goal, 7:10. Bengals 20–17.
- CIN – Mitchell Price 78-yard punt return (Jim Breech kick), 4:17. Bengals 27–17.
- NYG – Mark Ingram 19-yard pass from Phil Simms (Matt Bahr kick), 1:02. Bengals 27–24.

**Top passers**

- NYG – Phil Simms – 26/44, 296 yards, 3 TD
- CIN – Boomer Esiason – 17/30, 204 yards, TD

**Top rushers**

- NYG – Rodney Hampton – 16 rushes, 33 yards
- CIN – Craig Taylor – 5 rushes, 31 yards

**Top receivers**

- NYG – Mark Ingram – 7 receptions, 116 yards, TD
- CIN – Eddie Brown – 4 receptions, 95 yards

==== Week 15: vs. Philadelphia Eagles ====
Week 15: Philadelphia Eagles at New York Giants – Game summary

Quarter	1	2	3	4	Total
**Eagles**	0	10	3	6	**19**
Giants	7	7	0	0	**14**

at Giants Stadium, East Rutherford, New Jersey

- Date: December 8
- Game time: 1:00 p.m. EST
- Game weather: Overcast, 52 °F (11 °C)
- Game attendance: 76,099
- Referee: Tom White
- TV announcers (CBS): Pat Summerall and John Madden

Game information

**First quarter**

- NYG – Dave Meggett 8-yard pass from Phil Simms (Matt Bahr kick), 6:18. Giants 7–0.

**Second quarter**

- PHI – Roger Ruzek 46-yard field goal, 9:49. Giants 7–3.
- NYG – Dave Meggett 14-yard pass from Phil Simms (Matt Bahr kick), 5:29. Giants 14–3.
- PHI – Calvin Williams 8-yard pass from Jeff Kemp (Roger Ruzek kick), 0:42. Giants 14–10.

**Third quarter**

- PHI – Roger Ruzek 21-yard field goal, 3:04. Giants 14–13.

**Fourth quarter**

- PHI – Roger Ruzek 51-yard field goal, 14:05. Eagles 16–14.
- PHI – Roger Ruzek 36-yard field goal, 1:53. Eagles 19–14.

**Top passers**

- PHI – Jeff Kemp – 10/19, 146 yards, TD, 2 INT
- NYG – Phil Simms – 7/23, 100 yards, 2 TD, 2 INT

**Top rushers**

- PHI – Keith Byars – 12 rushes, 65 yards
- NYG – Rodney Hampton – 15 rushes, 47 yards

**Top receivers**

- PHI – Fred Barnett – 2 receptions, 68 yards
- NYG – Mark Ingram – 2 receptions, 37 yards

==== Week 16: at Washington Redskins ====
Week 16: New York Giants at Washington Redskins – Game summary

Quarter	1	2	3	4	Total
Giants	3	7	7	0	**17**
**Redskins**	7	17	3	7	**34**

at RFK Stadium, Washington D.C.

- Date: December 15
- Game time: 4:00 p.m. EST
- Game weather: Partly cloudy, 40 °F (4 °C)
- Game attendance: 54,722
- Referee: Pat Haggerty
- TV announcers (CBS): Pat Summerall and John Madden

Game information

**First quarter**

- NYG – Matt Bahr 36-yard field goal, 7:39. Giants 3–0.
- WAS – Gary Clark 65-yard pass from Mark Rypien (Chip Lohmiller kick), 7:22. Redskins 7–3.

**Second quarter**

- NYG – Phil Simms 1-yard run (Matt Bahr kick), 13:34. Giants 10–7.
- WAS – Gerald Riggs 1-yard run (Chip Lohmiller kick), 9:16. Redskins 14–10.
- WAS – Terry Orr 22-yard pass from Mark Rypien (Chip Lohmiller kick), 6:31. Redskins 21–10.
- WAS – Chip Lohmiller 36-yard field goal, 1:02. Redskins 24–10.

**Third quarter**

- WAS – Chip Lohmiller 36-yard field goal, 4:42. Redskins 27–10.
- NYG – Mark Ingram 18-yard pass from Phil Simms (Matt Bahr kick), 1:40. Redskins 27–17.

**Fourth quarter**

- WAS – Gary Clark 50-yard pass from Mark Rypien (Chip Lohmiller kick), 14:52. Redskins 34–17.

**Top passers**

- NYG – Phil Simms – 23/41, 288 yards, TD, 2 INT
- WAS – Mark Rypien – 9/19, 230 yards, 3 TD

**Top rushers**

- NYG – Rodney Hampton – 16 rushes, 67 yards
- WAS – Ricky Ervins – 13 rushes, 85 yards

**Top receivers**

- NYG – Mark Ingram – 6 receptions, 88 yards, TD
- WAS – Gary Clark – 3 receptions, 129 yards, 2 TD

==== Week 17: vs. Houston Oilers ====
Week 17: Houston Oilers at New York Giants – Game summary

Quarter	1	2	3	4	Total
Oilers	0	6	0	14	**20**
**Giants**	7	10	7	0	**24**

at Giants Stadium, East Rutherford, New Jersey

- Date: December 21
- Game time: 12:30 p.m. EST
- Game weather: Mostly cloudy, 39 °F (4 °C)
- Game attendance: 63,421
- Referee: Larry Nemmers
- TV announcers (NBC): Marv Albert and Paul Maguire

Game information

**First quarter**

- NYG – Rodney Hampton 2-yard run (Matt Bahr kick), 5:39. Giants 7–0.

**Second quarter**

- HOU – Al Del Greco 37-yard field goal, 13:46. Giants 7–3.
- NYG – Howard Cross 12-yard pass from Phil Simms (Matt Bahr kick), 7:40. Giants 14–3.
- NYG – Matt Bahr 54-yard field goal, 1:20. Giants 17–3.
- HOU – Al Del Greco 34-yard field goal, 0:03. Giants 17–6.

**Third quarter**

- NYG – Lewis Tillman 4-yard run (Matt Bahr kick), 9:04. Giants 24–6.

**Fourth quarter**

- HOU – Warren Moon 6-yard run (Al Del Greco kick), 6:06. Giants 24–13.
- HOU – Ernest Givins 5-yard pass from Warren Moon (Al Del Greco kick), 1:28. Giants 24–20.

**Top passers**

- HOU – Warren Moon – 22/36, 236 yards, TD
- NYG – Phil Simms – 15/17, 200 yards, TD

**Top rushers**

- HOU – Lorenzo White – 10 rushes, 82 yards
- NYG – Rodney Hampton – 28 rushes, 140 yards, TD

**Top receivers**

- HOU – Ernest Givins – 6 receptions, 87 yards, TD
- NYG – Howard Cross – 4 receptions, 51 yards, TD

=== Standings ===
NFC East
	W	L	T	PCT	DIV	CONF	PF	PA	STK
^{(1)} Washington Redskins	14	2	0	.875	6–2	10–2	485	224	L1
^{(5)} Dallas Cowboys	11	5	0	.688	5–3	8–4	342	310	W5
Philadelphia Eagles	10	6	0	.625	5–3	6–6	285	244	W1
New York Giants	8	8	0	.500	3–5	5–7	281	297	W1
Phoenix Cardinals	4	12	0	.250	1–7	3–11	196	344	L8

== See also ==
- List of New York Giants seasons
