= 1989 New York Giants season =

NFL team season

- Owner: Wellington Mara
- General manager: George Young
- Head coach: Bill Parcells
- Offensive coordinator: Ron Erhardt
- Defensive coordinator: Bill Belichick
- Home stadium: Giants Stadium

Results
- Record: 12–4
- Division place: 1st NFC East
- Playoffs: Lost Divisional Playoffs (vs. Rams) 13–19 (OT)
- Pro Bowlers: 2: LB Lawrence Taylor; KR David Meggett

The New York Giants played their 65th season in the National Football League (NFL) in 1989. After going 10–6 and suffering a heartbreaking final-day elimination from playoff contention in 1988, the team went 12–4 and won the NFC East. The Giants lost to the Los Angeles Rams 19–13 in the NFC Divisional playoffs.

Pro Bowl selections for the team were Dave Meggett and Lawrence Taylor. Ottis Anderson rushed for over 1,000 yards and was winner of the NFL Comeback Player of the Year Award.

== Offseason ==
=== NFL draft ===
1989 New York Giants draft
Round	Pick	Player	Position	College	Notes
1	18	Brian Williams	C	Minnesota	
3	64	Bob Kratch	G	Iowa	
3	78	Greg Jackson	S	LSU	
4	93	Lewis Tillman	RB	Jackson St	
4	105	Brad Henke	DT	Arizona	
5	132	Dave Meggett *	RB	Towson	
6	158	Howard Cross	TE	Alabama	
7	175	Dave Popp	T	Eastern Illinois	
8	218	Myron Guyton	S	Eastern Kentucky	
9	245	A.J. Greene	DB	Wake Forest	
10	272	Rodney Lowe	DE	Ole Miss	
11	299	Jerome Rinehart	DE	Tennessee-Martin	
12	326	Eric Smith	LB	UCLA	
Made roster † Pro Football Hall of Fame * Made at least one Pro Bowl during career

=== Undrafted free agents ===
1989 undrafted free agents of note
Player	Position	College
Lish Adams	Linebacker	Sam Houston State
Leon Cole	Defensive end	Texas A&M
LeRoy Etienne	Linebacker	Nebraska
Jeff Fryar	Tackle	Indiana
Jason Kuipers	Center	Florida State
Frank Miotke	Wide receiver	Grand Valley State
Travis Wallington	Linebacker	Navy
Dayne Williams	Running back	Florida State

== Roster ==
1989 New York Giants roster
Quarterbacks (QB): 15 Jeff Hostetler; 17 Jeff Rutledge; 11 Phil Simms; Running backs (RB): 33 George Adams; 24 Ottis Anderson; 44 Maurice Carthon FB; 30 Dave Meggett; 22 Lee Rouson; 34 Lewis Tillman; Wide receivers (WR): 85 Stephen Baker; 82 Mark Ingram KR; 86 Lionel Manuel; 81 Stacy Robinson; 83 Odessa Turner; Tight ends (TE): 87 Howard Cross; 84 Zeke Mowatt	Offensive linemen (OL): 76 Jumbo Elliott T; 61 Bob Kratch G; 60 Eric Moore T-G; 65 Bart Oates C; 72 Doug Riesenberg T; 66 William Roberts G; 59 Brian Williams; 69 Frank Winters; Defensive linemen (DL): 75 Mark Duckens DE; 74 Erik Howard NT; 70 Leonard Marshall DE; 73 John Washington DE; 71 Robb White DE; 77 Eric Dorsey DE	Linebackers (LB): 58 Carl Banks OLB; 98 Johnie Cooks ILB; 99 Steve DeOssie; 54 Dwayne Jiles OLB; 52 Pepper Johnson ILB; 55 Gary Reasons ILB; 56 Lawrence Taylor OLB; Defensive backs (DB): 25 Mark Collins CB; 38 Greg Cox FS; 29 Myron Guyton SS; 47 Greg Jackson SS; 43 Terry Kinard FS; 21 Reyna Thompson CB; 36 Adrian White SS; 39 Sheldon White CB; 23 Perry Williams CB; Special teams (ST): 5 Sean Landeta P; 3 Björn Nittmo K	Practice squad: 41 A. J. Greene CB; 80 Frank Miotke WR; 79 Dave Popp T; Reserve: 2 Raul Allegre K (IR); 89 Mark Bavaro TE (IR); 68 Damian Johnson G (IR); 57 Mike Hooten LB (IR); 20 Joe Morris RB (IR); Rookies in italics 47 active, 5 reserve, 4 practice squad

== Preseason ==
Week	Date	Opponent	Result	Record	Venue
1	August 12	at New England Patriots	W 20–17	1–0	Foxboro Stadium
2	August 20	at Kansas City Chiefs	W 45–7	2–0	Arrowhead Stadium
3	August 26	New York Jets	W 21–17	3–0	Giants Stadium
4	September 2	Pittsburgh Steelers	L 10–13	3–1	Giants Stadium

== Regular season ==
=== Schedule ===
Week	Date	Opponent	Result	Record	Venue	Recap
1	September 11	at **Washington Redskins**	**W** 27–24	1–0	RFK Stadium	Recap
2	September 17	Detroit Lions	**W** 24–14	2–0	Giants Stadium	Recap
3	September 24	**Phoenix Cardinals**	**W** 35–7	3–0	Giants Stadium	Recap
4	October 1	at **Dallas Cowboys**	**W** 30–13	4–0	Texas Stadium	Recap
5	October 8	at **Philadelphia Eagles**	**L** 19–21	4–1	Veterans Stadium	Recap
6	October 15	**Washington Redskins**	**W** 20–17	5–1	Giants Stadium	Recap
7	October 22	at San Diego Chargers	**W** 20–13	6–1	Jack Murphy Stadium	Recap
8	October 30	Minnesota Vikings	**W** 24–14	7–1	Giants Stadium	Recap
9	November 5	at **Phoenix Cardinals**	**W** 20–13	8–1	Sun Devil Stadium	Recap
10	November 12	at Los Angeles Rams	**L** 10–31	8–2	Anaheim Stadium	Recap
11	November 19	Seattle Seahawks	**W** 15–3	9–2	Giants Stadium	Recap
12	November 27	at San Francisco 49ers	**L** 24–34	9–3	Candlestick Park	Recap
13	December 3	**Philadelphia Eagles**	**L** 17–24	9–4	Giants Stadium	Recap
14	December 10	at Denver Broncos	**W** 14–7	10–4	Mile High Stadium	Recap
15	December 16	**Dallas Cowboys**	**W** 15–0	11–4	Giants Stadium	Recap
16	December 24	Los Angeles Raiders	**W** 34–17	12–4	Giants Stadium	Recap
Note: Intra-division opponents are in **bold** text.

=== Game summaries ===
==== Week 1 ====
Quarter	1	2	3	4	Total
**Giants**	7	7	0	13	**27**
Redskins	0	3	7	14	**24**

at RFK Stadium, Washington, D.C.

- Date: Monday, September 11
- Game time: 9:00 p.m.
- Game weather: 83 °F (28.3 °C), wind 11 miles per hour (18 km/h; 9.6 kn)
- Referee: Dick Hantak
- TV announcers (ABC): Al Michaels, Frank Gifford, and Dan Dierdorf
- Pro-Football-Reference.com

Game information

**First quarter**

- NYG – Odessa Turner 30-yard pass from Phil Simms (Raúl Allegre kick) – **Giants 7–0**

**Second quarter**

- NYG – Dave Meggett 62-yard pass from Phil Simms (Raúl Allegre kick) – **Giants 14–0**
- WSH – Chip Lohmiller 24-yard field goal – **Giants 14–3**

**Third quarter**

- WSH – Ricky Sanders 48-yard pass from Mark Rypien (Chip Lohmiller kick) – **Giants 14–10**

**Fourth quarter**

- NYG – Ottis Anderson 14-yard run (Raúl Allegre kick) – **Giants 21–10**
- WSH – Art Monk 6-yard pass from Mark Rypien (Chip Lohmiller kick) – **Giants 21–17**
- WSH – Monte Coleman 24-yard interception return (Chip Lohmiller kick) – **Redskins 24–21**
- NYG – Raúl Allegre 32-yard field goal – **Tie 24–24**
- NYG – Raúl Allegre 52-yard field goal – **Giants 27–24**

**Giants**

- Phil Simms
  11/19, 255 Yds, 2 TD, 2 INT
- Ottis Anderson
  23 Rush, 93 Yds, TD
- Odessa Turner
  3 Rec, 99 Yds, TD

**Redskins**

- Mark Rypien
  22/32, 349 Yds, 2 TD, INT
- Gerald Riggs
  24 Rush, 111 Yds
- Ricky Sanders
  6 Rec, 143 Yds, TD

==== Week 2 ====
Team	1	2	3	4	Total
Lions	0	7	7	0	14
• Giants	3	0	14	7	24

- Date: September 17
- Location: Giants Stadium
- Game weather: 69 °F or 20.6 °C, relative humidity 84%, wind 8 miles per hour (13 km/h; 7.0 kn)
- Referee: Johnny Grier

Scoring summary
Q1	6:46	NYG	Allegre 49 yard field goal	NYG 3–0
Q2	8:03	DET	Johnson 71 yard pass from Gagliano (Murray kick)	DET 7–3
Q3	9:55	DET	Sanders 4 yard run (Murray kick)	DET 14–3
Q3	5:10	NYG	Anderson 11 yard run (Allegre kick)	DET 14–10
Q3	0:43	NYG	Turner 9 yard pass from Simms (Allegre kick)	NYG 17–14
Q4	9:42	NYG	Bavaro 24 yard pass from Simms (Allegre kick)	NYG 24–14

==== Week 7 ====
Team	1	2	3	4	Total
• **Giants**	3	3	7	7	20
Chargers	0	3	3	7	13

- Date: October 22
- Location: Jack Murphy Stadium, San Diego, California
- Game start: 1:00 p.m. PST
- Game weather: 68 °F (20 °C), wind 8 miles per hour (13 km/h; 7.0 kn)
- Referee: Dale Hamer
- TV announcers (CBS): Pat Summerall and John Madden

Scoring summary
1	NYG	Raúl Allegre 21-yard field goal	Giants 3–0
2	SD	Chris Bahr 26-yard field goal	Tie 3–3
2	NYG	Raúl Allegre 40-yard field goal	Giants 6–3
3	NYG	Ottis Anderson 4-yard run (Raúl Allegre kick)	Giants 13–3
3	SD	Chris Bahr 30-yard field goal	Giants 13–6
4	NYG	Ottis Anderson 4-yard run (Raúl Allegre kick)	Giants 20–6
4	SD	Vencie Glenn 81-yard fumble return (Chris Bahr kick)	Giants 20–13

==== Week 14 ====
Team	1	2	3	4	Total
• Giants	0	14	0	0	14
Broncos	0	0	0	7	7

- Date: December 10
- Location: Mile High Stadium, Denver, Colorado
- Game start: 2:00 p.m. MST
- Game weather: 31 °F (−1 °C), wind 12 mph (19 km/h)
- Referee: Jerry Markbreit
- TV announcers (CBS): Pat Summerall and John Madden

Scoring summary
2	NYG	Ottis Anderson 3 yard run (Bjorn Nittmo kick)	Giants 7–0
2	NYG	David Meggett 57 yard pass from Phil Simms (Bjorn Nittmo kick)	Giants 14–0
4	DEN	Mike Young 32 yard pass from John Elway (David Treadwell kick)	Giants 14–7

=== Standings ===
NFC East
	W	L	T	PCT	DIV	CONF	PF	PA	STK
New York Giants^{(2)}	12	4	0	.750	6–2	8–4	348	252	W3
Philadelphia Eagles^{(4)}	11	5	0	.688	7–1	8–4	342	274	W1
Washington Redskins	10	6	0	.625	4–4	8–4	386	308	W5
Phoenix Cardinals	5	11	0	.313	2–6	4–8	258	377	L6
Dallas Cowboys	1	15	0	.063	1–7	1–13	204	393	L7

== Playoffs ==
Los Angeles Rams 19, New York Giants 13 (OT)

Quarter	1	2	3	4	OT	Total
Rams	0	7	0	6	6	19
Giants	6	0	7	0	0	13

at Giants Stadium, East Rutherford, New Jersey

- Game time: 12:30 p.m. EST
- Game weather: 37 °F or 2.8 °C, relative humidity 52%, wind 15 miles per hour (24 km/h; 13 kn), wind chill 29 °F or −1.7 °C
- Game attendance: 76,325
- Referee: Bob McElwee
- TV announcers (CBS): Pat Summerall and John Madden

The Rams upset the Giants with quarterback Jim Everett's 30-yard touchdown pass to Flipper Anderson with 1:06 gone in overtime. New York jumped to a 6–0 lead in the first quarter with two field goals by kicker Raúl Allegre. With 17 seconds left in the first half, Anderson caught a 20-yard touchdown reception from Everett to take a 7–6 lead. In the third quarter, Giants running back Ottis Anderson scored on a 2-yard touchdown. But in the fourth period, Los Angeles kicker Mike Lansford made two field goals to tie the game, the second one coming with 3:01 left in regulation.

== Awards and honors ==
- David Meggett, NFC Pro Bowl selection
- Lawrence Taylor, NFC Pro Bowl selection

== See also ==
- List of New York Giants seasons
