= 1990 New York Giants season =

NFL team season (won Super Bowl)

- Owner: Wellington Mara; Timothy J. Mara
- General manager: George Young
- Head coach: Bill Parcells
- Offensive coordinator: Ron Erhardt
- Defensive coordinator: Bill Belichick
- Home stadium: Giants Stadium

Results
- Record: 13–3
- Division place: 1st NFC East
- Playoffs: Won Divisional Playoffs (vs. Bears) 31–3; Won NFC Championship (at 49ers) 15–13; Won Super Bowl XXV (vs. Bills) 20–19
- Pro Bowlers: 7: C Bart Oates; G William Roberts; DT Erik Howard; LB Lawrence Taylor; LB Pepper Johnson; P Sean Landeta; ST Reyna Thompson

The 1990 New York Giants season was the franchise's 66th season in the National Football League (NFL). The Giants, who play in the National Football Conference (NFC), won their sixth championship and second Super Bowl. Led by linebacker Lawrence Taylor and quarterbacks Phil Simms and Jeff Hostetler, the Giants posted a 13–3 record before defeating the Chicago Bears and the two-time defending Super Bowl champion San Francisco 49ers in the NFC playoffs. In Super Bowl XXV, they defeated the Buffalo Bills 20–19 in Tampa Stadium. The story of the season is the subject of a recent book, When the Cheering Stops, by defensive end Leonard Marshall and CBSsports.com co-writer William Bendetson.

After making the playoffs in 1989, the Giants entered the 1990 season as a Super Bowl favorite, though most believed they stood little chance of stopping the 49ers. The Giants began the season with a 27–20 win over the Philadelphia Eagles, then won their next nine games before losing a rematch to Philadelphia 31–13 in Week 12. The Giants also lost close games to the 49ers on the road and to the Bills at home in the regular season before defeating both teams in playoff rematches. In the Week 15 game against Buffalo, starting quarterback Phil Simms was injured and ultimately lost for the season with a broken foot. He was replaced by Hostetler, who did not lose a game. The Giants' defense led the NFL in fewest points allowed (211), and the team set an NFL record by committing only 14 turnovers in the regular season. After the season, seven Giants were selected to the Pro Bowl.

In 2007, ESPN.com ranked the 1990 Giants' defense as the sixth-greatest in NFL history, noting that the team "allowed only 13.2 points a game against a very tough schedule – they played against seven playoff teams during the regular season. Led by Hall of Fame outside linebacker Lawrence Taylor and First Team All-Pro inside linebacker Pepper Johnson, New York's defense also came through in the playoffs, holding the Bears to just three points in the divisional playoff game. The Giants then held a resilient 49ers offense to just two field goals and one touchdown and set up the game-winning score by both forcing and recovering a late Roger Craig fumble involving NT Erik Howard and OLB Lawrence Taylor to win the NFC Championship Game 15–13. In Super Bowl XXV, the Giant defense held its own against the Bills' no-huddle offense while the Giants' offense executed long methodical drives that gave the Giants a time of possession advantage of 2 to 1, and New York won 20–19."

== Off-season ==
=== NFL draft ===
The Giants had 11 selections in the 12-round 1990 NFL draft and took running back Rodney Hampton in the first round with the #24 overall selection. They took defensive end Mike Fox from West Virginia University in the second round (#51 overall) and linebacker Greg Mark (#79 overall) of the University of Miami in the third round. Kicker Matt Stover was selected in the 12th round but spent the season on injured reserve.

1990 New York Giants draft
Round	Pick	Player	Position	College	Notes
1	27	Rodney Hampton *	Running back	Georgia	
2	51	Mike Fox	Defensive End	West Virginia	
3	79	Greg Mark	Linebacker	Miami (FL)	
4	107	David Whitmore	Safety	Stephen F. Austin	
5	135	Craig Kupp	Quarterback	Pacific Lutheran	
7	191	Aaron Emanuel	Running back	USC	
8	218	Barry Voorhees	Tackle	Cal State Northridge	
12	329	Matt Stover *	Kicker	Louisiana Tech	
Made roster * Made at least one Pro Bowl during career

=== Undrafted free agents ===
1990 undrafted free agents of note
Player	Position	College
Bobby Abrams	Linebacker	Michigan
Richard Apolskis	Guard	Arkansas
Gary Barlow	Guard	Pacific
Frank Baur	Quarterback	Lafayette
Greg Boysaw	CB-S	Illinois
Roy Brown	Guard	Virginia
Win Bryant	NT	Nicholls State
Ed Cunningham	Tackle	Texas
Mark Dennis	Linebacker	Central Michigan
Witliam Doyen	Tackle	West Virginia Tech
Troy Kyles	Wide receiver	Howard
Bruce Lang	Wide receiver	Fairmont State
Michael Lindsey	Linebacker	Southern
Andy Lock	Tackle	Missouri
Philip Ng	Wide receiver	Lafayette
Michael Riddick	Wide receiver	Delaware State
Chad Robinson	Linebacker	BYU
Terrance Sanders	Defensive End	Grambling
Clarence Seay	Wide receiver	UTEP
Chad Thorson	Linebacker	Wheaton
Kenneth Vines	Center	Central State (OH)

== Roster ==
1990 New York Giants roster
Quarterbacks (QB): 6 Matt Cavanaugh; 15 Jeff Hostetler; Running backs (RB): 24 Ottis Anderson; 44 Maurice Carthon FB; 27 Rodney Hampton KR; 30 Dave Meggett KR/PR; 22 Lee Rouson FB; 34 Lewis Tillman; Wide receivers (WR): 85 Stephen Baker; 82 Mark Ingram; 84 Troy Kyles; 81 Stacy Robinson; Tight ends (TE): 89 Mark Bavaro; 87 Howard Cross; 80 Bob Mrosko	Offensive linemen (OL): 76 Jumbo Elliott T; 61 Bob Kratch G; 60 Eric Moore T-G; 65 Bart Oates C; 64 Tom Rehder G-T; 72 Doug Riesenberg T; 66 William Roberts G; 59 Brian Williams G-C; Defensive linemen (DL): 77 Eric Dorsey DE; 93 Mike Fox DE; 74 Erik Howard NT; 70 Leonard Marshall DE; 73 John Washington DE	Linebackers (LB): 51 Bobby Abrams OLB; 58 Carl Banks OLB; 98 Johnie Cooks OLB; 99 Steve DeOssie ILB/LS; 52 Pepper Johnson ILB; 57 Larry McGrew OLB; 55 Gary Reasons ILB; 56 Lawrence Taylor OLB; Defensive backs (DB): 46 Roger Brown CB; 25 Mark Collins CB; 26 Dave Duerson SS; 29 Myron Guyton FS; 47 Greg Jackson SS; 21 Reyna Thompson CB; 28 Everson Walls CB; 43 David Whitmore FS; 23 Perry Williams CB; Special teams (ST): 9 Matt Bahr K; 5 Sean Landeta P	Practice squad: 92 Tim Downing DE; 54 Tracy Gravely LB; Reserve: 2 Raúl Allegre K; 79 Clint James DE (IR); 11 Phil Simms QB (IR); 3 Matt Stover K (IR); 83 Odessa Turner WR (IR); 36 Adrian White S (IR); Rookies in italics 47 active, 6 reserve, 2 practice squad

Defense

FS
Myron Guyton
⋅

WLB	ILB	ILB	SLB
Lawrence Taylor	Pepper Johnson	Steve DeOssie	⋅
⋅	⋅	⋅	⋅

SS
Greg Jackson
⋅

CB
Mark Collins
⋅

DE	NT	DE
John Washington	Erik Howard	Eric Dorsey
Leonard Marshall	⋅	⋅

CB
Everson Walls
⋅

Offense

WR
Stephen Baker
⋅

LT	LG	C	RG	RT
Eric Moore	William Roberts	Bart Oates	Bob Kratch	Doug Risenberg
Jumbo Elliott	⋅	⋅	Eric Moore	⋅

TE
Mark Bavaro
Howard Cross

WR
Mark Ingram
⋅

QB
Phil Simms
Jeff Hostetler

RB
Ottis Anderson
⋅

FB
Maurice Carthon
⋅

Special teams
PK Matt Bahr
P Sean Landeta
KR Dave Meggett
PR Dave Meggett

== Coaching staff ==
New York Giants 1990 coaching staff
Front office: Co-owner – Wellington Mara; Co-owner – Timothy J. Mara; general manager – George Young; Head coaches: Head coach – Bill Parcells; Offensive coaches: Offensive coordinator – Ron Erhardt; Running backs – Ray Handley; Wide receivers – Tom Coughlin; Tight ends – Mike Pope; Offensive line – Fred Hoaglin	Defensive coaches: Defensive coordinator/secondary – Bill Belichick; Defensive line – Romeo Crennel; Linebackers – Al Groh; Special teams coaches: Special teams coordinator – Mike Sweatman; Assistant special teams – Charlie Weis; Source:

Super Coaching Staff: https://www.giants.com/news/super-coaching-staff

== Schedule ==
=== Preseason ===
Week	Date	Opponent	Result	Record	Venue	Recap
1	August 13	at Buffalo Bills	**W** 20–6	1–0	Rich Stadium	Recap
2	August 18	at Houston Oilers	**W** 13–10	2–0	Houston Astrodome	Recap
3	August 25	New York Jets	**W** 17–7	3–0	Giants Stadium	Recap
4	September 1	Cleveland Browns	**W** 28–10	4–0	Giants Stadium	Recap

=== Regular season ===
Week	Date	Opponent	Result	Record	Venue	Recap
1	September 9	**Philadelphia Eagles**	**W** 27–20	1–0	Giants Stadium	Recap
2	September 16	at **Dallas Cowboys**	**W** 28–7	2–0	Texas Stadium	Recap
3	September 23	Miami Dolphins	**W** 20–3	3–0	Giants Stadium	Recap
4	September 30	**Dallas Cowboys**	**W** 31–17	4–0	Giants Stadium	Recap
5	Bye					
6	October 14	at **Washington Redskins**	**W** 24–20	5–0	RFK Stadium	Recap
7	October 21	**Phoenix Cardinals**	**W** 20–19	6–0	Giants Stadium	Recap
8	October 28	**Washington Redskins**	**W** 21–10	7–0	Giants Stadium	Recap
9	November 5	at Indianapolis Colts	**W** 24–7	8–0	Hoosier Dome	Recap
10	November 11	at Los Angeles Rams	**W** 31–7	9–0	Anaheim Stadium	Recap
11	November 18	Detroit Lions	**W** 20–0	10–0	Giants Stadium	Recap
12	November 25	at **Philadelphia Eagles**	**L** 13–31	10–1	Veterans Stadium	Recap
13	December 3	at San Francisco 49ers	**L** 3–7	10–2	Candlestick Park	Recap
14	December 9	Minnesota Vikings	**W** 23–15	11–2	Giants Stadium	Recap
15	December 15	Buffalo Bills	**L** 13–17	11–3	Giants Stadium	Recap
16	December 23	at **Phoenix Cardinals**	**W** 24–21	12–3	Sun Devil Stadium	Recap
17	December 30	at New England Patriots	**W** 13–10	13–3	Foxboro Stadium	Recap
Note: Intra-division opponents are in **bold** text.

=== Game summaries ===
==== Week 1: vs. Philadelphia Eagles ====
Team	1	2	3	4	Total
Eagles	3	7	0	10	20
• **Giants**	6	0	14	7	27

- Date: Sunday, September 9
- Location: Giants Stadium, East Rutherford, New Jersey
- Game start: 8:15 p.m. EST
- Game attendance: 76,202
- Game weather: 64 °F or 17.8 °C, relative humidity 61%, wind 6 miles per hour (9.7 km/h; 5.2 kn)
- Referee: Gordon McCarter
- TV announcers (TNT): Skip Caray and Pat Haden

Scoring summary
1	NYG	Raúl Allegre 38-yard field goal	NYG 3–0
1	NYG	Raúl Allegre 46-yard field goal	NYG 6–0
1	PHI	Roger Ruzek 37-yard field goal	NYG 6–3
2	PHI	Anthony Toney 18-yard pass from Keith Byars (Roger Ruzek kick)	PHI 10–6
3	NYG	Rodney Hampton 12-yard pass from Phil Simms (Raúl Allegre kick)	NYG 13–10
3	NYG	Dave Meggett 68-yard punt return (Raúl Allegre kick)	NYG 20–10
4	NYG	Mark Ingram 41-yard pass from Phil Simms (Raúl Allegre kick)	NYG 27–10
4	PHI	Randall Cunningham 1-yard run (Roger Ruzek kick)	NYG 27–17
4	PHI	Roger Ruzek 29-yard field goal	NYG 27–20

The Giants started the season with a 27–20 home win over the Philadelphia Eagles ending a four game losing streak to the Eagles. Despite sitting out training camp and the preseason in a contract dispute, linebacker Lawrence Taylor recorded three sacks and a forced fumble. The Giants' defense forced three turnovers and held the Eagles to 83 rushing yards. The Giants' offense scored three touchdowns in a 13-minute span in the third and early fourth quarters, but head coach Bill Parcells felt the offensive performance was lackluster overall: "Our runners didn't run the way we wanted them to. They were a little impatient. There were five or six vivid examples of cutting back too soon. You just have to give the play a chance and let it go where it's supposed to."

==== Week 2: at Dallas Cowboys ====
Team	1	2	3	4	Total
• **Giants**	0	14	7	7	28
Cowboys	0	7	0	0	7

- Date: Sunday, September 16
- Location: Texas Stadium, Irving, Texas
- Game start: 1:00 p.m. EST
- Game attendance: 61,090
- Game weather: 84 °F or 28.9 °C, relative humidity 58%, wind 5 miles per hour (8.0 km/h; 4.3 kn)
- Referee: Jerry Seeman
- TV announcers (CBS): Dick Stockton and Merlin Olsen

Scoring summary
2	NYG	Phil Simms 4-yard run (Raúl Allegre kick)	NYG 7–0
2	NYG	Ottis Anderson 1-yard run (Raúl Allegre kick)	NYG 14–0
2	DAL	Alexander Wright 90-yard kickoff return (Ken Willis kick)	NYG 14–7
3	NYG	Mark Bavaro 4-yard pass from Phil Simms (Raúl Allegre kick)	NYG 21–7
3	NYG	Lawrence Taylor 11-yard interception return (Raúl Allegre kick)	NYG 28–7

With temperatures reaching 122° on the artificial turf at Texas Stadium, the Giants played the Dallas Cowboys on September 16. The Giants dominated from the outset and used backup players heavily throughout the game. Lawrence Taylor batted a Troy Aikman pass high into the air, which he caught and returned for a touchdown. The Giants' defense held the Cowboys to 20 rushing yards and 156 yards of total offense, while the Giants' offense gained 369 yards. The Cowboys totaled only nine first downs, averaged 1.8 yards per rush and were dominated in time of possession, 41:40 to 18:20. Despite the 28–7 victory, Giants center Bart Oates still felt the offense could improve its play: "[w]e missed a lot of assignments. We rushed the ball O.K., but not like we did against Buffalo in preseason. Phil was pressured some. There were plenty of things we didn't do."

==== Week 3: vs. Miami Dolphins ====
Team	1	2	3	4	Total
Dolphins	0	0	3	0	3
• **Giants**	3	7	0	10	20

- Date: Sunday, September 23
- Location: Giants Stadium, East Rutherford, New Jersey
- Game start: 1:00 p.m. EST
- Game attendance: 76,483
- Game weather: 63 °F or 17.2 °C, relative humidity 66%, wind 17 miles per hour (27 km/h; 15 kn)
- Referee: Jerry Markbreit
- TV announcers (NBC): Dick Enberg and Bill Walsh

Scoring summary
1	NYG	Raúl Allegre 22-yard field goal	NYG 3–0
2	NYG	Ottis Anderson 1-yard run (Raúl Allegre kick)	NYG 10–0
3	MIA	Pete Stoyanovich 51-yard field goal	NYG 10–3
4	NYG	Ottis Anderson 2-yard run (Raúl Allegre kick)	NYG 17–3
4	NYG	Raúl Allegre 45-yard field goal	NYG 20–3

On September 23 at Giants Stadium, before 76,483 fans, the Giants met the Miami Dolphins for the first time since the Dolphins' undefeated 1972 season. Miami held the ball for only 19:42, and totaled only 158 yards of offense. The Giants' offense set the tone by holding the ball for 10:25 on the opening drive, leading to a field goal by Raúl Allegre. Holding Dan Marino to 119 total yards, and 3.6 yards per passing attempt, the Giants prevailed by a score of 20–3. Parcells was criticized by the local media for playing Taylor in the final moments, despite the lopsided score, after he had injured his hamstring.

==== Week 4: vs. Dallas Cowboys ====
Team	1	2	3	4	Total
Cowboys	0	3	7	7	17
• **Giants**	7	10	0	14	31

- Date: Sunday, September 30
- Location: Giants Stadium, East Rutherford, New Jersey
- Game start: 1:00 p.m. EST
- Game attendance: 75,923
- Game weather: 69 °F or 20.6 °C, relative humidity 80%, wind 13 miles per hour (21 km/h; 11 kn)
- Referee: Dale Hamer
- TV announcers (CBS): Pat Summerall and John Madden

Scoring summary
1	NYG	Mark Ingram 12-yard pass from Phil Simms (Matt Bahr kick)	NYG 7–0
2	DAL	Ken Willis 22-yard field goal	NYG 7–3
2	NYG	Matt Bahr 34-yard field goal	NYG 10–3
2	NYG	Bob Mrosko 7-yard pass from Phil Simms (Matt Bahr kick)	NYG 17–3
3	DAL	Emmitt Smith 4-yard run (Ken Willis kick)	NYG 17–10
4	NYG	Rodney Hampton 27-yard pass from Phil Simms (Matt Bahr kick)	NYG 24–10
4	NYG	Jeff Hostetler 12-yard run (Matt Bahr kick)	NYG 31–10
4	DAL	Jay Novacek 7-yard pass from Troy Aikman (Ken Willis kick)	NYG 31–17

The Giants faced the Dallas Cowboys in Week 4 before 75,923 fans at Giants Stadium. The Giants' defense held the Cowboys to 51 rushing yards on 20 attempts, and the Giants controlled the ball for 35:38. Giants quarterback Phil Simms threw three touchdowns, and backup Jeff Hostetler ran for a 12-yard score late in the fourth quarter. Although the Giants' league-leading defense gave up 284 yards, 84 came on the Cowboys' final possession when the Giants played a prevent defense. Simms threw touchdown passes to Mark Ingram and Rodney Hampton, and the Giants built a 31–10 early in the fourth quarter before pulling their starters and allowing a Dallas touchdown.

==== Week 6: at Washington Redskins ====
Team	1	2	3	4	Total
• **Giants**	0	7	14	3	24
Redskins	3	0	10	7	20

- Date: Sunday, October 14
- Location: RFK Stadium, Washington, D.C.
- Game start: 4:15 p.m. EST
- Game attendance: 54,737
- Game weather: 74 °F or 23.3 °C, relative humidity 68%, wind 11 miles per hour (18 km/h; 9.6 kn)
- Referee: Tom Dooley
- TV announcers (CBS): Pat Summerall and John Madden

Scoring summary
1	WSH	Chip Lohmiller 42-yard field goal	WSH 3–0
2	NYG	Stephen Baker 80-yard pass from Phil Simms (Matt Bahr kick)	NYG 7–3
3	WSH	Chip Lohmiller 35-yard field goal	NYG 7–6
3	NYG	Ottis Anderson 5-yard run (Matt Bahr kick)	NYG 14–6
3	WSH	Ricky Sanders 31-yard pass from Earnest Byner (Chip Lohmiller kick)	NYG 14–13
3	NYG	Mark Bavaro 2-yard pass from Phil Simms (Matt Bahr kick)	NYG 21–13
4	WSH	Gerald Riggs 1-yard run (Chip Lohmiller kick)	NYG 21–20
4	NYG	Matt Bahr 19-yard field goal	NYG 24–20

The Giants used their bye week to allow injured players such as linebacker Carl Banks, running back Rodney Hampton, special teamer Reyna Thompson, defensive lineman Erik Howard and offensive tackle Jumbo Elliott to recover from injuries. They played the Washington Redskins on the road the following week. The Giants forced four turnovers and won despite losing the time of possession battle, 35:28 to 24:32. Defensive coordinator Bill Belichick singled out free safety Greg Jackson, who had two interceptions, after the 24–20 win: "Jackson must have had 10 interceptions in practice, and if ever the cliche held true about a player playing the way he practices, it was so this week."

==== Week 7: vs. Phoenix Cardinals ====
Team	1	2	3	4	Total
Cardinals	3	7	6	3	19
• **Giants**	7	3	0	10	20

- Date: Sunday, October 21
- Location: Giants Stadium, East Rutherford, New Jersey
- Game start: 4:00 p.m. EST
- Game weather: 57 °F or 13.9 °C, relative humidity 62%, wind 10 miles per hour (16 km/h; 8.7 kn)
- Referee: Gene Barth
- TV announcers (CBS): Dick Stockton and Merlin Olsen

Scoring summary
1	NYG	Ottis Anderson 4-yard rush (Matt Bahr kick)	NYG 7–0
1	PHO	Al Del Greco 39-yard field goal	NYG 7–3
2	NYG	Matt Bahr 34-yard field goal	NYG 10–3
2	PHO	Luis Sharpe 1-yard pass from Timm Rosenbach (Al Del Greco kick)	PHO 10–10
3	PHO	Al Del Greco 18-yard field goal	PHO 13–10
3	PHO	Al Del Greco 34-yard field goal	PHO 16–10
4	PHO	Al Del Greco 45-yard field goal	PHO 19–10
4	NYG	Stephen Baker 38-yard pass from Jeff Hostetler (Matt Bahr kick)	PHO 19–17
4	NYG	Matt Bahr 40-yard field goal	NYG 20–19

In Week 7, the Giants faced the Phoenix Cardinals in front of 76,518 fans at Giants Stadium. They rushed for 151 yards on 31 carries, and committed only four penalties for 24 yards. Their defense held the Cardinals to 96 passing yards and 221 yards of total offense. With 5:38 left in the game, the Cardinals–13-point underdogs—extended their lead to 19–10, and had knocked Simms out of the game. However, the Giants came back with a 38-yard touchdown from Jeff Hostetler to Stephen Baker, and Hostetler then led a late drive culminating in a game-winning 40-yard field goal by Matt Bahr to win 20–19. The Giants' tone was subdued in their locker room after the win. "It wasn't pretty", said Taylor. "But you don't ask how to win, you just win."

==== Week 8: vs. Washington Redskins ====
	1	2	3	4	Total
Redskins	0	3	7	0	**10**
**Giants**	0	14	0	7	**21**

At home in front of 75,321 fans, the Giants played the Washington Redskins in Week 8. Each team totaled 16 first downs, four punts and five penalties, and the difference in time of possession was less than one minute. However, the Giants committed no turnovers while coercing three from the Redskins. Giants cornerback Everson Walls intercepted two passes—including one that he returned for his first career touchdown—and free safety Greg Jackson intercepted another. Walls' interception set up a Giants touchdown and a 14–0 lead in the second quarter. Jackson then intercepted a pass in the end zone in the third quarter to preserve a 14–10 lead, and Walls returned his second interception 28 yards for a touchdown that made the score 21–10 and put the game out of reach in the fourth quarter.

==== Week 9: At Indianapolis Colts ====
	1	2	3	4	Total
**Giants**	3	14	0	7	**24**
Colts	0	0	7	0	**7**

at Hoosier Dome, Indianapolis, Indiana

The Giants improved to 8–0 with a 24–7 win over the Indianapolis Colts in front of 56,688 in the Hoosier Dome. The Giants' defense held the Colts to 11 first downs, 181 total yards and 55 rushing yards. Simms completed 17 of 21 passes for 172 yards, with no touchdowns and was picked once, which ended his streak of 150 passes without an interception. Defensive end Leonard Marshall sacked Colts quarterback Jeff George twice, Dave Duerson returned a fumble for a touchdown and the Giants' defense held George to 160 yards passing on 37 pass attempts. The Giants controlled the game from the start, ending the first half leading 17–0, and besting the Colts 206 to 45 in total yards, 13 to 1 in first downs and 20:57 to 9:03 in time of possession.

==== Week 10: At Los Angeles Rams ====
	1	2	3	4	Total
**Giants**	3	7	7	14	**31**
Rams	0	0	7	0	**7**

at Anaheim Stadium, Anaheim, California

The Giants traveled to face the Los Angeles Rams on November 11, winning 31–7 in front of 64,632 fans at Anaheim Stadium and led by Simms' efficient passing. The Rams had beaten the Giants three times in the past two years, including one win in the 1989 playoffs. Although the Giants were able to sack Rams quarterback Jim Everett just twice, they limited him to 17-of-36 passing for 186 yards, no touchdowns and three interceptions. "It's hard to sack him", Belichick said. "But we kept the pressure on. We had the same coverage we used the last eight years. Nothing radically different."

==== Week 11: vs. Detroit Lions ====
	1	2	3	4	Total
Lions	0	0	0	0	**0**
**Giants**	7	13	0	0	**20**

The Giants defeated the Detroit Lions 20–0 in Week 11 to improve to 10–0, and set a franchise record for wins to start a season. Simms threw a 57-yard touchdown pass to receiver Mark Ingram in the second quarter to run the score to 17–0. After the Giants kicked a field goal to make the score 20–0, the teams played a scoreless second half. The shutout was the Giants' first of the season, and coach Parcells commented, "[t]he defense played very well. The offense played well when I let them. We played conservatively in the second half. We played pretty much error-free. We didn't do anything stupid."

==== Week 12 at Philadelphia Eagles ====
New York Giants (10–0) at Philadelphia Eagles (6–4)

Quarter	1	2	3	4	Total
Giants	7	6	0	0	**13**
Eagles	7	7	3	14	**31**

at Veterans Stadium • Philadelphia, Pennsylvania

- Date: Sunday, November 25
- Game time: 1:00 pm. EST
- Game weather: Cloudy • 52 °F or 11.1 °C • Wind 13 miles per hour (21 km/h; 11 kn)
- Referee: Red Cashion
- TV announcers (CBS): Dick Stockton and Merlin Olsen
- Pro-Football-Reference.com, The Football Database

Game information

Giants

- Phil Simms
  17/40, 234 Yds, 2 TD, 2 INT
- Dave Meggett
  2 Rush, 61 Yds
- Stephen Baker
  3 Rec, 65 Yds

Eagles

- Randall Cunningham
  17/31, 229 Yds, 2 TD
- Heath Sherman
  21 Rush, 71 Yds
- Keith Byars
  8 Rec, 128 Yds

The Giants were dealt their first loss at the hands of the Philadelphia Eagles on November 25 by a score of 31–13, dropping their record to 10–1. The Eagles broke open a close game by scoring two touchdowns in 22 seconds in the fourth quarter. The game was marked by several scuffles, and after the game some of the Giants players complained of the tactics used by the Eagles. The Eagles amassed 179 rushing yards and 405 total yards, and punted the ball just twice. Eagles quarterback Randall Cunningham rushed for 66 yards while completing 17 of 31 passes for 229 yards, two touchdowns and no interceptions. Taylor, who recorded three sacks and seven tackles in the Giants' season-opening victory over the Eagles, was held to one tackle in the loss.

Scoring summary

Quarter	Time	Drive			Team	Scoring information	Score	
Quarter	Time	Plays	Yards	TOP	Team	Scoring information	NYG	PHI
1	5:22				Giants	Ingram 15-yard touchdown reception from Simms, Bahr kick good	7	0
1	3:39				Eagles	Barnett 49-yard touchdown reception from Cunningham, Ruzek kick good	7	7
2	6:21				Eagles	Cunningham 1-yard touchdown run, Ruzek kick good	7	14
2	1:00				Giants	Bavaro 4-yard touchdown reception from Simms, Bahr kick no good	13	14
3	9:09				Eagles	39-yard field goal by Ruzek	13	17
4	13:12				Eagles	Williams 6-yard touchdown reception from Cunningham, Ruzek kick good	13	24
4	12:50				Eagles	Interception returned 22 yards for touchdown by Evans, Ruzek kick good	13	31
"TOP" = time of possession. For other American football terms, see Glossary of American football.							13	31

==== Week 13: At San Francisco 49ers ====
	1	2	3	4	Total
Giants	0	3	0	0	**3**
**49ers**	0	7	0	0	**7**

at Candlestick Park, San Francisco, California

The San Francisco 49ers matched the Giants with their own 10–0 start in the 1990 season. Although both teams lost in week 12 to stand at 10–1, their Week 13 matchup on Monday Night Football was still highly anticipated. The game took place in front of 66,092 fans at Candlestick Park. After the Giants opened the scoring in the second quarter with a Matt Bahr field goal, the 49ers answered with the game's only touchdown on a 23-yard pass from Joe Montana to John Taylor. Neither team would score again for the remainder of the contest, though the Giants came very close to reclaiming the lead when they drove to the 49ers' 9-yard line with four minutes left in regulation. However, the 49ers stopped the Giants on four consecutive pass attempts and held on to defeat New York 7–3. Following the game's conclusion, 49ers safety Ronnie Lott and Simms had a heated verbal exchange. Despite the loss, the Giants defense performed well, limiting the 49ers to 152 passing yards, 88 rushing yards, and holding All-Pro wide receiver Jerry Rice to a single 13-yard reception. 49ers defensive end Charles Haley recorded five tackles, 1.5 sacks, and two forced fumbles in the victory.

==== Week 14: vs. Minnesota Vikings ====
	1	2	3	4	Total
Vikings	5	7	3	0	**15**
**Giants**	3	7	0	13	**23**

The Giants hosted the Minnesota Vikings in Week 14. Led by Taylor, who recorded 12 tackles and two sacks, the Giants' defense held the Vikings to 132 passing yards. Taylor also forced a fumble by Vikings quarterback Rich Gannon and pressured Gannon into an interception by Gary Reasons at the Minnesota 17-yard line, which positioned Matt Bahr for the game-clinching 18-yard field goal. In addition, Taylor gave several inspirational speeches to his teammates. "He told us: 'I'm going to start playing the way we're supposed to play. If anybody wants to come along, fine,' " inside linebacker Steve DeOssie said. "He changed our attitude." The Giants won 23–15 to improve to 11–2. Prior to this game, Parcells had been hospitalized for kidney stones.

==== Week 15: vs. Buffalo Bills ====
	1	2	3	4	Total
**Bills**	7	7	0	3	**17**
Giants	7	3	3	0	**13**

In what would turn out to be a preview of Super Bowl XXV, the Giants lost at home to the Buffalo Bills 17–13 in Week 15. The game was played in inclement weather, which caused 10,295 no-shows at Giants Stadium. They led the Bills in total yards (313 to 264), rushing yards (157 to 65), first downs (20 to 13) and time of possession (37:59 to 22:01), but lost nonetheless. Simms broke his foot during the game, causing him to miss the remainder of the season, and was replaced by Jeff Hostetler, who had engineered the Giants' Week 7 fourth-quarter comeback against Phoenix. The Bills built a 14–10-second quarter lead behind 74- and 78-yard touchdown drives. The teams alternated field goals to make the score 17–13. However, the Giants could not score in the fourth quarter despite mounting drives to the Bills' 18 and 23 yard lines. This was Lionel Manuel's last game as a Giant, as he was waived afterwards.

==== Week 16: At Phoenix Cardinals ====
	1	2	3	4	Total
**Giants**	3	7	7	7	**24**
Cardinals	0	7	7	7	**21**

at Sun Devil Stadium, Tempe, Arizona

The Giants played the Phoenix Cardinals in Tempe, Arizona in Week 16. Their defense allowed 452 yards, and Cardinals quarterback Timm Rosenbach threw for three touchdowns and set a new career high with 381 yards passing. The Giants noticed in the week leading up to the game that teams had success running with their fullback against the Cardinals, and in the game, Giants fullback Maurice Carthon set a career high with 67 rushing yards on 12 carries. They also installed several plays to take advantage of quarterback Jeff Hostetler's scrambling ability. Hostetler threw for 191 yards and ran for 31 in his first start of the season. The Giants held on to win 24–21 when two of the Cardinals' fourth-quarter drives ended with interceptions and their final drive was ended by a Taylor sack. The win clinched the NFC's #2 seed (over the Chicago Bears) and a first-round bye for the playoffs.

==== Week 17: At New England Patriots ====
	1	2	3	4	Total
**Giants**	10	3	0	0	**13**
Patriots	0	10	0	0	**10**

at Foxboro Stadium, Foxboro, Massachusetts

The Giants travelled to Massachusetts to face the 1–14 New England Patriots at Foxboro Stadium in Week 17. The game was a de facto home game – the Patriots' penultimate home game drew barely 20,000 fans, so tens of thousands of Giants fans made the trip up to Foxborough to sell the stadium out. While the anemic Patriots had been long eliminated from playoff contention, the game had no playoff implications for the Giants either since they could not surpass the 49ers for the #1 seed in the NFC playoffs. The Giants rushed for a season-high 213 yards, led by Hostetler's 82 yards on 10 carries. The Patriots' Jason Staurovsky missed a potential game-tying 42-yard field goal in the fourth quarter, and Hostetler then ran a 30-yard bootleg on a key third-down play to allow the Giants to run out the clock and secure the victory, 13–10.

=== Standings ===
NFC East
	W	L	T	PCT	DIV	CONF	PF	PA	STK
^{(2)} New York Giants	13	3	0	.813	7–1	10–2	335	211	W2
^{(4)} Philadelphia Eagles	10	6	0	.625	5–3	9–3	396	299	W3
^{(5)} Washington Redskins	10	6	0	.625	4–4	7–5	381	301	W1
Dallas Cowboys	7	9	0	.438	2–6	6–8	244	308	L2
Phoenix Cardinals	5	11	0	.313	2–6	3–9	268	396	L3

== Playoffs ==
The Giants finished the regular season having committed an NFL record-low 14 turnovers, and their defense led the league in fewest points allowed (211).

Round	Date	Opponent (seed)	Result	Record	Venue	Recap
Wild Card	Bye					
Divisional	January 13, 1991	Chicago Bears (3)	W 31–3	1–0	Giants Stadium	Recap
NFC Championship	January 20, 1991	at San Francisco 49ers (1)	W 15–13	2–0	Candlestick Park	Recap
Super Bowl XXV	January 27, 1991	Buffalo Bills (A1)	W 20–19	3–0	Tampa Stadium	Recap

=== NFC Divisional Playoff: Vs Chicago Bears ===
Team	1	2	3	4	Total
Bears	0	3	0	0	3
• Giants	10	7	7	7	31

- Date: Sunday, January 13
- Location: Giants Stadium, East Rutherford, New Jersey
- Referee: Dick Hantak
- TV announcers (CBS): Pat Summerall and John Madden

The Giants defeated the Chicago Bears 31–3 at home in the NFC Divisional playoff game on January 13, 1991. Ottis Anderson rushed for 80 yards on 21 carries, and the Giants rushed for 194 yards overall, dominating time of possession; with more than 38 minutes on offense. Parcells, at the suggestion of Belichick, used a four-man defensive line most of the game—as opposed to the Giants' traditional 3-4 defense—confusing the unprepared Bears, who had trouble with their blocking assignments. The Giants were 4-for-4 on fourth-down plays and converted 6 of 14 third downs. The Giants' defense stopped the Bears on the goal line on a fourth-down attempt in the second quarter and held Bears quarterback Mike Tomczak to 17-of-36 passing for 205 yards and two interceptions. Bears running back Neal Anderson was kept to a season-low 19 yards on 12 carries. Hostetler threw for two touchdowns and ran for a third.

=== NFC Championship Game: At San Francisco 49ers ===
	1	2	3	4	Total
Giants	3	3	3	6	15
49ers	3	3	7	0	13

at Candlestick Park, San Francisco, California

The Giants advanced to face the two-time defending champion San Francisco 49ers in the NFC Championship game on January 20, 1991, in front of 65,750 fans at Candlestick Park. The winner of the game would go directly to Tampa to play the Super Bowl the following week. Parcells used this as a motivating factor. Before the game, Parcells said that the team could pack for only 2 days or the entire week. He then threw down a big suitcase and told his players "I guess you know which one I'm packing for." The game was a rematch of the 7–3 49ers win one month earlier. The teams alternated field goals in the first and second quarter to make the score 6–6 at halftime. Less than five minutes into the third quarter, 49ers quarterback Joe Montana threw a 61-yard touchdown pass to receiver John Taylor to give San Francisco a 13–6 lead. A Giants field goal made the score 13–9 at the end of the third quarter. With 9:42 remaining in the game, Leonard Marshall sacked and injured Montana, who left the game. The Giants got the ball back, but were stopped on a key third down and one. On fourth down, Parcells called a fake punt, and fortunately for the Giants the 49ers only had 10 men on the field, which resulted in a long run by Gary Reasons to set up another Giants field goal, making the score 13–12. The 49ers then attempted to run out the clock, but Giants nose tackle Erik Howard made a key play, fighting through a double-team to knock the ball out of running back Roger Craig's possession by getting his helmet on the football. Lawrence Taylor fought through a block at the line of scrimmage applied by tight end Brent Jones and a subsequent block by fullback Tom Rathman to position himself at Craig's location along the line of scrimmage to catch Howard's forced fumble in mid-air, which gave the ball to the Giants at their own 43-yard line. Hostetler completed passes to Bavaro and Baker, advancing the Giants to within Matt Bahr's field-goal range. Bahr's fifth made kick of the day, a 42-yarder with no time left on the clock, gave the Giants a 15–13 victory.

With the win, not only did the Giants advance to their second Super Bowl, they became and still remain the only team in NFL history to defeat a two-time repeat Super Bowl champion in the playoffs on the road.

=== Super Bowl XXV ===
	1	2	3	4	Total
Bills	3	9	0	7	19
Giants	3	7	7	3	20

at Tampa Stadium, Tampa, Florida

Super Bowl XXV took place amidst a background of war and patriotism in front of 73,813 fans at Tampa Stadium, in Tampa, Florida. The Gulf War had begun less than two weeks previous and the nation rallied around the Super Bowl as a symbol of America. Adding to the patriotic feeling was Whitney Houston's stirring rendition of the national anthem, perhaps the greatest in Super Bowl history. The game itself was among the most competitive Super Bowls ever played. The Giants got off to a quick 3–0 lead. However, the Bills scored the next 12 points, on a field goal, a touchdown by backup running back Don Smith and a safety after Jeff Hostetler was sacked in the end zone by Bruce Smith. Down 12–3, the Giants ran a drive that took nearly eight minutes and culminated in a 14-yard touchdown pass from Hostetler to Stephen Baker, making the score 12–10 at halftime.

The Giants received the second-half kickoff and mounted a drive during which they converted on five third-down plays over the course of more than nine minutes (a Super Bowl record) and scored on a one-yard touchdown run by Ottis Anderson, giving the Giants a 17–12 lead. The signature play of the drive came on a third-down play, when Giants receiver Mark Ingram appeared about to be tackled well short of a first down. However, Ingram evaded several tacklers, dragging one defender in the process, to gain just enough yards for a first down. The Giants' strategy to handle the Bills' potent offense had become clear: keep them off the field. The Giants' two touchdown drives consumed over 17 minutes.

The Bills struck back quickly. On the first play of the fourth quarter, Thurman Thomas ran for a 31-yard touchdown that put the Bills back in front, 19–17. A few possessions later, the Giants drove down to the Bills' 4-yard line but had to settle for a 21-yard field goal by Matt Bahr that gave the Giants a 20–19 lead. Both teams exchanged possessions before the Bills began one final drive. The Bills drove down to the Giants' 30-yard line to set up a game-winning 47-yard field goal attempt by Scott Norwood. Just before the kick, ABC showed a graphic indicating that, on grass that season, Norwood had only made three of seven field goals from at least 40 yards, and that the 47-yarder would be Norwood's longest ever on grass. A few moments later, in what became the game's signature moment, Norwood's attempt missed wide right, and the Giants won their second Super Bowl in five years, 20–19.

The Giants set a Super Bowl record for time of possession with a mark of 40:33, and Ottis Anderson was named MVP of the game after rushing for 102 yards and a touchdown.

== Season Facts ==
- This year was the second of four times that the Giants faced a team in the regular season that they later played in the Super Bowl. The Giants are 2–2 in the regular season and 4–0 in the Super Bowl against these teams.
- The Giants wore their home blue uniforms for their first seven games; five of those games were played at home and the remaining two were at the Dallas Cowboys and Washington Redskins, who traditionally wore their white uniforms at home. In all, the Giants wore their blue jerseys 12 times (winning 11 of those games) and their white jerseys seven times (winning five of those games).
- The Giants played the Miami Dolphins for the first time since their first meeting in 1972.
- The Giants set an NFL record for the fewest turnovers in a 16-game season, with 14.
- The Giants had a 13-game regular-season winning streak: three wins in 1989 and 10 wins in 1990.
- The Giants' 10–0 start was the best in team history, and their 13–3 record was their second-best in a 16-game season.
- The Giants' victory over the Bears in the NFC Divisional game was their first over the Bears in the playoffs since 1956.

== Awards and honors ==
- Ottis Anderson, Super Bowl Most Valuable Player
- Reyna Thompson, 1990 All-Madden Team
- Reyna Thompson, 1990 NFC Pro Bowl selection
- Eric Howard, 1990 All-Madden Team
- Matt Bahr, 1990 All-Madden Team
- Lawrence Taylor, 1990 NFC Pro Bowl selection
- Lawrence Taylor, 1990 Second Team All-Pro
- Sean Landeta, 1990 NFC Pro Bowl selection
- Sean Landeta, 1990 First Team All-Pro
- David Meggett, 1990 NFC Pro Bowl selection
- Pepper Johnson, 1990 NFC Pro Bowl selection
- Pepper Johnson, 1990 First Team All-Pro
- Bart Oates, 1990 NFC Pro Bowl selection

== See also ==
- History of the New York Giants (1979–93)
- List of New York Giants seasons

== Sources ==
- Neft, David S., Cohen, Richard M., and Korch, Rick. The Complete History of Professional Football from 1892 to the Present. New York: St. Martin's Press. 1994 ISBN 0-312-11435-4
- Pervin, Lawrence A. Football's New York Giants: A History. McFarland 2009 ISBN 0-7864-4268-9
- Schwartz, John. Tales from the New York Giants Sideline, Sports Publishing LLC, 2004 ISBN 1-58261-758-9
- Sprechman, Jordan and Shannon, Bill. This Day in New York Sports, Illinois: Sports Publishing LLC. 1998 ISBN 1-57167-254-0
