= Stephen Baker (American football) =

American football player (born 1964)

No. 85
- Position: Wide receiver

Personal information
- Born: August 30, 1964 (age 62); San Antonio, Texas, U.S.
- Listed height: 5 ft 8 in (1.73 m)
- Listed weight: 160 lb (73 kg)

Career information
- High school: Hamilton (Los Angeles, California)
- College: Fresno State
- NFL draft: 1987: 3rd round, 83rd overall pick

Career history
- New York Giants (1987–1992)

Awards and highlights
- Super Bowl champion (XXV)

Career NFL statistics
- Receptions: 141
- Receiving yards: 2,587
- Receiving touchdowns: 21
- Stats at Pro Football Reference

Stephen Edward Baker (born August 30, 1964) is an American former professional football player who was a wide receiver for six seasons with the New York Giants of the National Football League (NFL). He played college football for the Fresno State Bulldogs.

== Early life ==
Baker attended Alexander Hamilton High School in Los Angeles, California, where he lettered in football, track, and gymnastics.

== College career ==
Baker attended college at Fresno State University, where he caught 62 passes for 1,629 yards in two seasons.

== Professional career ==
Pre-draft measurables
Height	Weight	Arm length	Hand span	40-yard dash	10-yard split	20-yard split	20-yard shuttle	Vertical jump
5 ft 8 in (1.73 m)	157 lb (71 kg)	30 1/4 in (0.77 m)	8 1/4 in (0.21 m)	4.60 s	1.58 s	2.61 s	4.41 s	31.0 in (0.79 m)
All values from NFL Combine

Drafted by the New York Giants in the third round (83rd overall) of the 1987 NFL draft, Baker played for the Giants his entire career from 1987 to 1992. Also known as Stephen Baker "The Touchdown Maker," he won a championship ring with New York in Super Bowl XXV, when they defeated the Buffalo Bills 20–19. Baker caught two passes for 31 yards, including a 14-yard touchdown pass from Jeff Hostetler late in the second quarter.

Baker finished his six NFL seasons with 141 receptions for 2,587 yards and 21 touchdowns, along with 21 rushing yards.

In 1992, according to Football Outsiders, Baker had the worst catch rate of any wide receiver from 1991–2011, catching only 28.8% of the passes thrown to him.

In 2008, Baker was inducted into the Fresno County Athletic Hall of Fame.

== NFL career statistics ==
Legend
	Won the Super Bowl
**Bold**	Career high

=== Regular season ===
Year	Team	Games		Receiving				
Year	Team	GP	GS	Rec	Yds	Avg	Lng	TD
1987	NYG	12	5	15	277	18.5	50	2
1988	NYG	**16**	11	**40**	**656**	16.4	**85**	**7**
1989	NYG	15	4	13	255	19.6	39	2
1990	NYG	**16**	8	26	541	**20.8**	80	4
1991	NYG	15	**13**	30	525	17.5	52	4
1992	NYG	**16**	11	17	333	19.6	46	2
		90	52	141	2,587	18.3	85	21

=== Playoffs ===
Year	Team	Games		Receiving				
Year	Team	GP	GS	Rec	Yds	Avg	Lng	TD
1989	NYG	1	1	2	46	**23.0**	**27**	0
1990	NYG	**3**	**2**	**7**	**111**	15.9	25	**2**
		4	3	9	157	17.4	27	2

== Personal life ==
Baker is an enthusiast of radio-controlled airplanes and helicopters.
