= Mark Ingram Sr. =

American football player (born 1965)

Mark Ingram
No. 82, 85
- Position: Wide receiver

Personal information
- Born: August 23, 1965 (age 61); Rockford, Illinois, U.S.
- Listed height: 5 ft 10 in (1.78 m)
- Listed weight: 194 lb (88 kg)

Career information
- High school: Flint Northwestern (Flint, Michigan)
- College: Michigan State
- NFL draft: 1987: 1st round, 28th overall pick

Career history
- New York Giants (1987–1992); Miami Dolphins (1993–1994); Green Bay Packers (1995); Philadelphia Eagles (1996)

Awards and highlights
- Super Bowl champion (XXV); Second-team All-Big Ten (1986)

Career NFL statistics
- Receptions: 265
- Receiving yards: 3,926
- Receiving touchdowns: 26
- Stats at Pro Football Reference

Mark Valentino Ingram Sr. (born August 23, 1965) is an American former professional football player who was a wide receiver in the National Football League (NFL) for the New York Giants (1987–1992), the Miami Dolphins (1993 to 1994), the Green Bay Packers (1995), and the Philadelphia Eagles (1996). He played college football for the Michigan State Spartans. He is the father of Mark Ingram II, who won the Heisman Trophy in 2009 and is the New Orleans Saints' second all-time leader in rushing yards.

== Early life ==
Ingram played high school football at Flint Northwestern High School in Flint, Michigan. In high school, Ingram played at the quarterback position with Andre Rison at halfback. He then played college football at Michigan State University in East Lansing, Michigan. At Michigan State, Ingram was moved to the position of wide receiver, where he remained throughout his collegiate and professional career.

== Professional career ==
Pre-draft measurables
| Height | Weight | Arm length | Hand span | 40-yard dash | 10-yard split | 20-yard split | 20-yard shuttle | Vertical jump | Broad jump | Bench press |
|---|---|---|---|---|---|---|---|---|---|---|
| 5 ft 10 5/8 in (1.79 m) | 188 lb (85 kg) | 30 1/4 in (0.77 m) | 9 in (0.23 m) | 4.42 s | 1.53 s | 2.54 s | 4.16 s | 32.0 in (0.81 m) | 9 ft 3 in (2.82 m) | 8 reps |
All values from NFL Combine

Ingram was drafted by the Giants in the first round (28th overall) in the 1987 NFL draft. He is probably best known for a third down play in Super Bowl XXV in which he eluded at least five Buffalo Bills defenders to achieve a critical first down for the Giants to sustain a long touchdown drive. He finished the game as the Giants top receiver with five catches for 77 yards. As a Miami Dolphin, in a game against the New York Jets, Ingram caught four touchdown passes from Dan Marino. The most notable was the game-winning touchdown, which was the result of Marino faking out the Jets defense by indicating he was going to spike the ball to stop the clock. Instead, he lobbed a short pass to Ingram, who was open in the end zone.

Ingram retired after the 1996 season.

== NFL career statistics ==
Legend
| | Won the Super Bowl |
| **Bold** | Career high |

=== Regular season ===
| Year | Team | Games | | Receiving | | | | |
| Year | Team | GP | GS | Rec | Yds | Avg | Lng | TD |
|---|---|---|---|---|---|---|---|---|
| 1987 | NYG | 9 | 0 | 2 | 32 | 16.0 | 18 | 0 |
| 1988 | NYG | 7 | 4 | 13 | 158 | 12.2 | 32 | 1 |
| 1989 | NYG | **16** | 3 | 17 | 290 | 17.1 | 41 | 1 |
| 1990 | NYG | **16** | 14 | 26 | 499 | **19.2** | 57 | 5 |
| 1991 | NYG | **16** | 13 | **51** | **824** | 16.2 | 41 | 3 |
| 1992 | NYG | 12 | 12 | 27 | 408 | 15.1 | 34 | 1 |
| 1993 | MIA | **16** | **16** | 44 | 707 | 16.1 | **77** | **6** |
| 1994 | MIA | 15 | 13 | 44 | 506 | 11.5 | 64 | **6** |
| 1995 | GNB | **16** | 9 | 39 | 469 | 12.0 | 29 | 3 |
| 1996 | PHI | 5 | 0 | 2 | 33 | 16.5 | 20 | 0 |
| Career | | 128 | 84 | 265 | 3,926 | 14.8 | 77 | 26 |

=== Playoffs ===
| Year | Team | Games | | Receiving | | | | |
| Year | Team | GP | GS | Rec | Yds | Avg | Lng | TD |
|---|---|---|---|---|---|---|---|---|
| 1989 | NYG | 1 | 0 | 0 | 0 | 0.0 | 0 | 0 |
| 1990 | NYG | **3** | **3** | **11** | **168** | **15.3** | **22** | 0 |
| 1995 | GNB | **3** | 2 | 5 | 22 | 4.4 | 8 | 0 |
| Career | | 7 | 5 | 16 | 190 | 11.9 | 22 | 0 |

== Legal problems ==
On September 16, 2008, Ingram was sentenced to seven years in prison and up to five years of probation for money laundering and fraud. He was also ordered in a Long Island federal court to pay $252,000 in restitution. Ingram failed to show up to a federal prison in Ashland, Kentucky to turn himself in on December 5, 2008, and an arrest warrant was issued. On January 2, 2009, Ingram was arrested in a Flint, Michigan hotel room, where he was preparing to watch his son play in the 2009 Sugar Bowl. On March 22, 2010, in a courtroom in Central Islip, New York, Ingram was sentenced to an additional two years in prison for jumping bail. He was housed at Yazoo City Federal Correctional Complex (FCC) as inmate 22749-050, and was then in the custody of the Residential Reentry Management Detroit. Ingram was released from prison in early 2015.

== Personal life ==
Ingram's son, Mark Ingram II, played for the Alabama Crimson Tide and won the Heisman Trophy in 2009 and was drafted in the first round of the 2011 NFL draft by the New Orleans Saints, where he is their second all-time leader in rushing yardage.
