= Ottis Anderson =

American football player (born 1957)

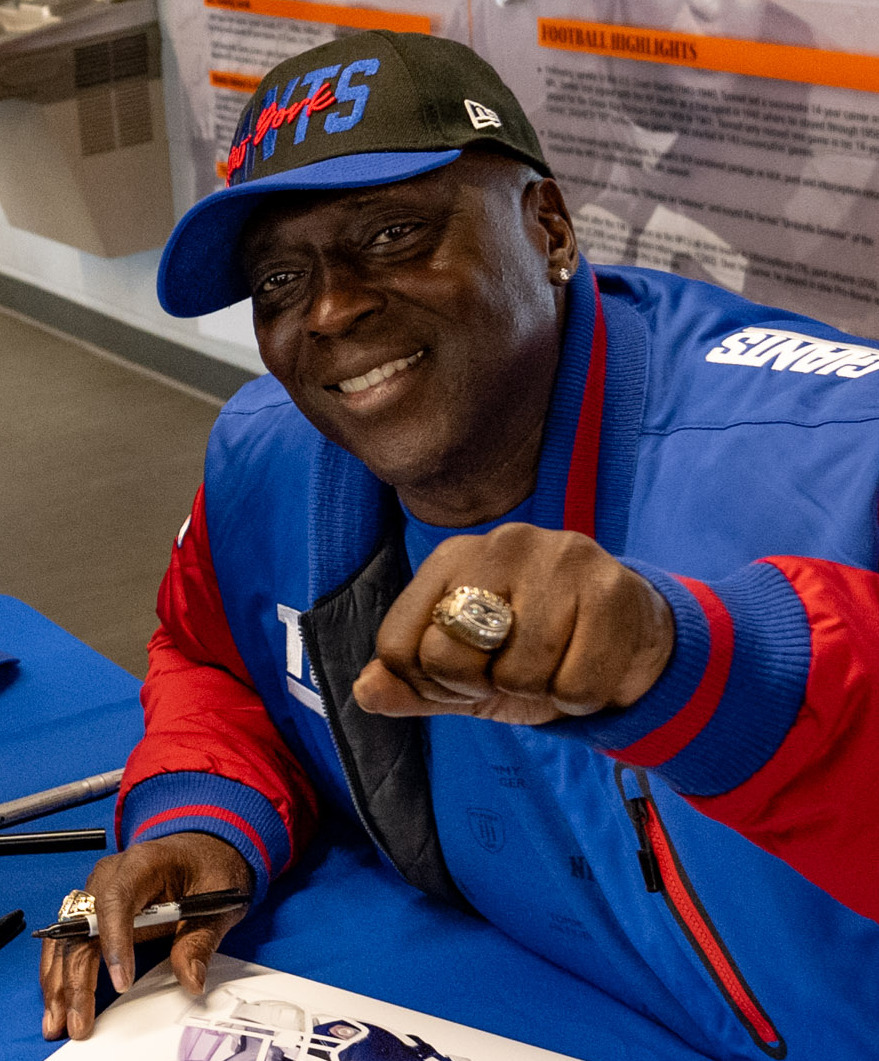
- Anderson in 2023

No. 32, 24
- Position: Running back

Personal information
- Born: January 19, 1957 (age 69); West Palm Beach, Florida, U.S.
- Listed height: 6 ft 2 in (1.88 m)
- Listed weight: 220 lb (100 kg)

Career information
- High school: Forest Hill (West Palm Beach)
- College: Miami (FL) (1975–1978)
- NFL draft: 1979: 1st round, 8th overall pick

Career history
- St. Louis Cardinals (1979–1986); New York Giants (1986–1992)

Awards and highlights
- 2× Super Bowl champion (XXI, XXV); Super Bowl MVP (XXV); NFL Offensive Rookie of the Year (1979); NFL Comeback Player of the Year (1989); First-team All-Pro (1979); Second-team All-Pro (1980); 2× Pro Bowl (1979, 1980); PFWA All-Rookie Team (1979); New York Giants Ring of Honor; 51st greatest New York Giant of all-time

Career NFL statistics
- Rushing yards: 10,273
- Rushing average: 4
- Rushing touchdowns: 81
- Receptions: 376
- Receiving yards: 3,062
- Receiving touchdowns: 5
- Stats at Pro Football Reference

Ottis Jerome Anderson (born January 19, 1957) is an American former professional football running back who played in the National Football League (NFL) for 14 seasons with the St. Louis Cardinals and New York Giants. He played college football for the Miami Hurricanes, setting the school record for rushing yards. Anderson was selected eighth overall in the 1979 NFL draft by the Cardinals.

In his first season, Anderson was named Offensive Rookie of the Year and received Pro Bowl and first-team All-Pro honors when he set the Cardinals all-time record for rushing yards. He also received a second Pro Bowl selection the following year. Traded to the Giants in 1986 amid a production decline, Anderson won two Super Bowl titles in Super Bowl XXI and Super Bowl XXV. Anderson was named MVP of the latter, in which he played a central part in helping the Giants set the Super Bowl record for time of possession.

== Early life ==
Ottis Jerome Anderson was born and raised in West Palm Beach, Florida. He was a football and track star at Forest Hill High School in West Palm Beach, graduating in 1975.

== College career ==
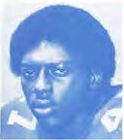
Anderson in 1976

Anderson attended the University of Miami on a full athletic scholarship and earned a degree in Physical Education. During his college career, Anderson broke Chuck Foreman's career rushing records at the University of Miami, becoming the first player to rush for more than 1,000 yards in the school's history his senior year with 1,266 yards. He received honorable mention as an All-American by the Associated Press, and graduated in 1979 as the team's all-time leading rusher with 3,331 yards.

Anderson was inducted into the University of Miami Sports Hall of Fame in 1990.

=== Statistics ===
Season	Rushing			Receiving		
Season	Att	Yds	TD	Rec	Yds	TD
1975	67	365	0	11	128	1
1976	213	918	6	10	121	0
1977	187	782	1	20	243	3
1978	224	1,266	8	14	47	0
Career	691	3,331	15	55	539	4

== Professional career ==
Anderson was selected in the first round of the 1979 NFL draft, the 8th overall pick, by the St. Louis Cardinals. He had one of the greatest debut games in NFL history, rushing for 193 yards, which was just 1 yard shy of Alan Ameche's all-time record for an NFL debut (Ameche rushed for 194 yards for the Baltimore Colts in 1955). His single season 1,605 rushing yard performance was one of the few bright spots in the Cardinals' 1979 season, when they finished 5–11. He earned the first of back-to-back Pro Bowl selections that year.

In his first six seasons, Anderson rushed for over 1,000 yards in five seasons. The lone exception was in the 1982 strike-shortened season, when he rushed for 587 yards in eight games; a pace for well over 1,000 yards in a full 16-game season.

The Cardinals made the playoffs in 1982, thanks to an expanded field due to the brevity of the season. It was the franchise's first postseason appearance since 1975 and last until 1998. Anderson rushed for 58 yards on eight carries against the Green Bay Packers in the team's lone playoff game.

Injuries drastically decreased the number of games Anderson played each season, and his explosiveness as a tailback. After a year and a half, Stump Mitchell emerged as the Cards' top running back, and the expendable Anderson was traded to the New York Giants in the middle of the 1986 season. He ended up deep in the Giants' depth chart. By this time in his career, it was clear that he was better used in goal line or short yardage situations. Anderson would rush for only six yards on seven carries in the 1986 playoffs, but did score a rushing touchdown in the Giants' victory over the Denver Broncos in Super Bowl XXI.

In his first two and a half seasons with New York, Anderson did not fumble once in his 100 offensive touches. In 1989, Anderson become the top running back for Bill Parcells' ball control offense and was named NFL Comeback Player of the Year. He scored a career-high 14 rushing touchdowns and rushed for 1,023 yards on 325 carries. He was also the top running back for the Giants the following year when they won Super Bowl XXV, and was named Super Bowl MVP for his 102 yards and a touchdown on 21 carries. As a testament to the Giants' ball control strategy, their time of possession was double that of the Buffalo Bills, their opponents, in the first Super Bowl without a turnover. Anderson is one of only four running backs in NFL history to score rushing touchdowns in two Super Bowls and win Super Bowl MVP (only Franco Harris and John Riggins accomplished this feat before Anderson, and only Emmitt Smith has achieved it since).

Anderson was replaced by Rodney Hampton in 1991. His last season was 1992. Anderson fumbled just three times in 739 touches as a Giant, from 1987 to 1992.

When he retired, Anderson ranked seventh in rushing touchdowns and eighth in rushing yards. At the 2014 season, Anderson was ranked 19th in career rushing touchdowns and is one of 31 running backs in the history of the NFL to rush for more than 10,000 yards (currently ranked 30th in career rushing yards at the conclusion of the 2019 NFL season).

== NFL career statistics ==
Legend
	Won the Super Bowl
	Super Bowl MVP
**Bold**	Career high

=== Regular season ===
Year	Team	Games		Rushing					Receiving				
Year	Team	GP	GS	Att	Yds	Avg	Lng	TD	Rec	Yds	Avg	Lng	TD
1979	STL	16	16	**331**	**1,605**	**4.8**	**76**	9	41	308	7.5	28	**2**
1980	STL	16	16	301	1,352	4.5	52	9	36	308	8.6	35	0
1981	STL	16	16	328	1,376	4.2	28	9	51	387	7.6	27	0
1982	STL	8	8	145	587	4.0	64	3	14	106	7.6	19	0
1983	STL	15	15	296	1,270	4.3	43	5	54	459	8.5	40	1
1984	STL	15	15	289	1,174	4.1	24	6	**70**	**611**	8.7	**57**	**2**
1985	STL	9	8	117	479	4.1	38	4	23	225	**9.8**	43	0
1986	STL	4	3	51	156	3.1	14	2	10	91	9.1	19	0
1986	NYG	8	0	24	81	3.4	16	1	9	46	5.1	12	0
1987	NYG	4	0	2	6	3.0	4	0	2	16	8.0	9	0
1988	NYG	16	0	65	208	3.2	11	8	9	57	6.3	13	0
1989	NYG	16	16	325	1,023	3.1	36	**14**	28	268	9.6	26	0
1990	NYG	16	11	225	784	3.5	28	11	18	139	7.7	18	0
1991	NYG	10	1	53	141	2.7	9	1	11	41	3.7	13	0
1992	NYG	13	0	10	31	3.1	6	0	0	0	0.0	0	0
Career		182	125	2,562	10,273	4.0	76	81	376	3,062	8.1	57	5

== Life after football ==
The end of Anderson's 14-year football career in 1993 marked the beginning of his career in entrepreneurship and motivational speaking.

Anderson has appeared on several major local and national radio and television shows, including The David Letterman Show and Good Morning America. He appeared on Comedy Central's Tosh.0 during the Crying Giants' Fan Web Redemption. Chris Cuomo of ABC News interviewed Anderson as part of One Moment in Time: The Life of Whitney Houston, a two-hour special on ABC shortly after the death of singer Whitney Houston. In Super Bowl XXV, Houston performed "The Star-Spangled Banner", and Anderson and then-Giants quarterback Jeff Hostetler, along with then-Buffalo Bills quarterback Frank Reich, reflected on Houston's performance in that game.

He was a broadcast analyst with WFAN for the New York Giants, and he co-hosted three radio shows in St. Louis with former Cardinal teammates Theotis Brown, E.J. Junior and Roy Green. Anderson was a frequent guest on The Billy Taylor Show in New York City and contributed to an in-season weekly column, Ask Ottis, in the Giants Insider publication.

As president of Ottis J. Anderson Enterprises, Anderson is also involved in several ventures and is involved with writing benefits for municipalities, school boards and privately held businesses in New Jersey. In 2017, Anderson began working as the Vice President of Business Development for Metro Exhibits, selling trade show booths and services. He has endorsed Global Syn-Turf, Inc. synthetic turf for sports fields.

Anderson has been affiliated with many community organizations such as the United Way of America, Boys & Girls Clubs of America, National Multiple Sclerosis Society, The Breast Cancer Research Foundation, and the Deborah Hospital Foundation.

Anderson was inducted into the St. Louis Sports Hall of Fame on May 2, 2022.

== See also ==
- History of the New York Giants (1979–1993)
