= Jeff Hostetler =

American football player (born 1961)

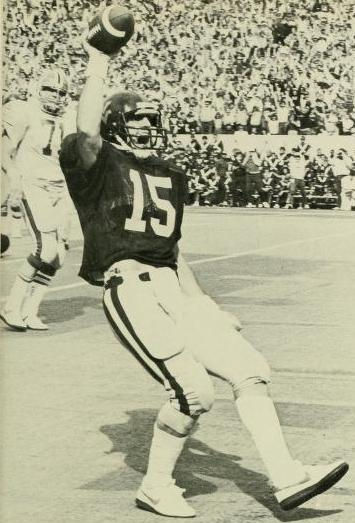
- Hostetler during his collegiate career with West Virginia

No. 15
- Position: Quarterback

Personal information
- Born: April 22, 1961 (age 65); Hollsopple, Pennsylvania, U.S.
- Listed height: 6 ft 3 in (1.91 m)
- Listed weight: 215 lb (98 kg)

Career information
- High school: Conemaugh Township Area (Conemaugh Township, Pennsylvania)
- College: Penn State (1979–1980); West Virginia (1981–1983)
- NFL draft: 1984: 3rd round, 59th overall pick

Career history
- New York Giants (1984–1992); Los Angeles / Oakland Raiders (1993–1996); Washington Redskins (1997–1998)

Awards and highlights
- 2× Super Bowl champion (XXI, XXV); Pro Bowl (1994); 79th greatest New York Giant of all-time; Third-team All-American (1983); Second-team All-East (1983)

Career NFL statistics
- Passing attempts: 2,338
- Passing completions: 1,357
- Completion percentage: 58.0%
- TD–INT: 94–71
- Passing yards: 16,430
- Passer rating: 80.5
- Rushing yards: 1,391
- Rushing touchdowns: 17
- Stats at Pro Football Reference

William Jeffrey Hostetler (born April 22, 1961) is an American former professional football player who was a quarterback in the National Football League (NFL) for the New York Giants, Los Angeles/Oakland Raiders, and Washington Redskins. He won Super Bowl XXV with the Giants after taking over late in the regular season for an injured Phil Simms. His nickname is "Hoss."

== College career ==
=== Penn State ===
Hostetler started his career at Penn State, where he started three games for the 1980 season. But Todd Blackledge soon beat him out for the starting quarterback job, and Hostetler transferred to West Virginia. Hostetler sat out the 1981 season, due to NCAA transfer rules.

=== West Virginia ===
Hostetler's first game as a Mountaineer was a 41–27 win over the #9 1982 Oklahoma Sooners football team, when he threw for four touchdowns and 321 yards. The upset victory earned Hostetler Offensive Player of the Week honors from Sports Illustrated. Another big win that season was a week later against the Maryland Terrapins, who were led by Boomer Esiason. The Mountaineers won 19–18 against the Top 10 ranked Terps. The Terps lost the game on a two-point conversion, while Hostetler threw for 285 yards and a touchdown. Hostetler led the Mountaineers to the 1982 Gator Bowl, where they lost to Florida State 31–12. Hostetler totaled 1,916 yards with ten touchdown passes that season.

In 1983, Hostetler led the #7 Mountaineers over Big East rival Pitt after a fourth quarter run to beat the Panthers 24–21, the first victory over Pitt in seven years. Hostetler led the game-winning drive that he capped out with a bootleg touchdown run for victory. In the 1983 Hall of Fame Bowl, Hostetler pulled out a come-from-behind 20–16 victory over the University of Kentucky, throwing two touchdowns. Hostetler finished his college career in the 1984 Hula Bowl and in the Japan Bowl. Hostetler threw for 2,345 yards and 16 touchdowns his senior season.

Hostetler was honored as a third-team All-American for 1983 by Gannett News Service.

Hostetler's two-year tenure at WVU led him to an 18–6 record under coach Don Nehlen. Hostetler ranks among single-season leaders at WVU in total offense, passing yards, pass completions, pass attempts, touchdown passes and passing efficiency. Hostetler also is the career leader in interception avoidance. Hostetler was named to the WVU all-time roster. In 1998, Hostetler was inducted into the West Virginia Sports Hall of Fame.

Hostetler was named to the 1984 GTE/CoSIDA academic All-America team and that same year won the National Football Foundation postgraduate scholarship. He was also a fan favorite in Morgantown and inspired a record, "Ole Hoss (The Ballad of West Virginia's Jeff Hostetler)".

== Professional career ==
=== New York Giants ===
Hostetler was drafted by the Giants in the third round of the 1984 NFL draft. In his first five seasons, he played sparingly, rarely making an appearance as he was the third-string quarterback behind Phil Simms and Jeff Rutledge. The first time he ever touched a football in a regular season game was in the 1986 season, when he blocked a punt in a game against the Philadelphia Eagles. His first start came late in the 1988 season, where he helped lead the Giants to victory in a road game against the New Orleans Saints. In 1989, he started a key game in the middle of the season, leading the Giants to a Monday night victory over the Minnesota Vikings. However, outside of these games, Hostetler's primary roles were mop-up duty and as a holder for kickers Raul Allegre, Bjorn Nittmo, and Matt Bahr. In 2007, in the episode of America's Game: The Super Bowl Champions that profiled the 1990 Giants team, Hostetler noted that he was frustrated with his lack of playing time and volunteered to play other positions, including wide receiver and blocker on the punt return team.

Hostetler finally seemed to reach his breaking point in December 1990. He had seen meaningful action in only one game that season, replacing Simms in the Giants' first game against the Phoenix Cardinals. Although he led the team to victory by engineering a late comeback with the team down 19–10 (they would win 20–19), Simms resumed his starting position the next week. Heading into Week 15 against the Buffalo Bills, Hostetler had decided that at the end of the season, he was retiring from the NFL and returning home. Something happened that week, however, that would eventually lead him to change his mind.

In the second half of the Buffalo game, which the Giants would go on to lose, Simms again went down with an injury. The Giants lost the game; Hostetler, speaking again to NFL Network, did not believe that Simms was hurt badly and figured that he was only a placeholder until Simms returned. As it turned out, Simms had suffered a severe foot injury and thus would be out for the remainder of the season, giving Hostetler his long-awaited opportunity. He led the Giants to two victories, a second win to secure a season sweep over the Cardinals and a surprisingly close victory over the team with the worst record in the league, the New England Patriots, and secured them a first-round bye with a 13–3 record. The Giants then beat the Chicago Bears in the divisional playoff.

In the NFC Championship against the San Francisco 49ers, Hostetler suffered a knee injury in the fourth quarter when Jim Burt, his former teammate, hit him low after Hostetler released the ball. Although he was injured, Hostetler was able to walk off the field on his own and later returned to the game and engineered two late scoring drives, that culminated with a Bahr field goal, and a 15–13 victory.

Hostetler started Super Bowl XXV; the Giants defeated the heavily favored Bills 20–19. He completed 20 of 32 passes for 222 yards with one touchdown. In 2008, ESPN ranked Hostetler's performance the 30th best quarterback performance in Super Bowl history. After reconsidering his retirement, he elected to return for the 1991 season.

During the summer of 1991, new coach Ray Handley made a decision regarding his quarterbacks. Instead of giving the starting job back to the now-healthy Simms, the coach held an open competition that Hostetler would ultimately win. He then led the Giants to victory in the season opener against the 49ers at home, snapping their NFL-record 18 game road winning streak. In his twelfth start against the Tampa Bay Buccaneers, Hostetler broke his back and missed the rest of the season. Of the games Hostetler started (including the one he didn't finish), the Giants went 7–5. Simms, meanwhile, lost his first three starts against the lowly Cincinnati Bengals (who won only three times that year), the Philadelphia Eagles (a loss which eliminated the Giants from playoff contention), and the eventual Super Bowl champion Washington Redskins. The Giants managed to win their final matchup against the Houston Oilers to finish 8–8.

When the 1992 season began, Hostetler was again the backup as Simms managed to regain the starter's spot. However, the veteran's proneness to injury again caught up with him, and in Week 4, Simms suffered a severe elbow injury that ended up costing him the rest of the season. Hostetler was once again given the helm but he also had injury issues, including suffering a concussion. He missed three games after resuming his starting position but finished with five victories in his nine starts, including three wins against winning teams. Despite that, he only managed to throw for eight touchdowns, and the Giants, who went through four quarterbacks that season, finished 6–10.

After the 1992 season, Ray Handley was fired, and former Denver Broncos coach Dan Reeves was hired as his replacement. Simms would be named the starter and Hostetler's contract was not renewed for 1993.

=== Los Angeles / Oakland Raiders ===
In the 1993 offseason, Hostetler moved west and signed a contract with the Los Angeles Raiders. He would become their starter and once again found success as the Raiders finished with a 10–6 record and made the playoffs as a wild card.

Following the 1993 regular season, Hostetler led the Raiders to an impressive 42–24 playoff win over the Denver Broncos. The veteran quarterback threw for 294 yards and three touchdowns in what would be the last NFL playoff game played in Los Angeles until the 2017 season, when the LA Rams hosted the Atlanta Falcons in the wild card round.

In 1994, Hostetler was voted to his only career Pro Bowl after leading the Raiders to a 9–7 record. With the Raiders back in Oakland for the 1995 campaign, Hostetler got his team off to an impressive 8–2 record. However, a shoulder injury kept him out for all but the final game of the season. The Raiders lost their final six games and finished 8–8.

Hostetler's final year in Oakland saw him reach a career high in touchdown passes with 23, as he started thirteen games and finished with a 7–6 record. Once again, however, the Raiders missed the playoffs and at the end of the season, Hostetler was again out of work as the Raiders did not offer him a contract.

=== Washington Redskins ===
The 36-year old Hostetler signed a contract with the Washington Redskins for 1997, with the team signing him as a backup for their fourth-year starter Gus Frerotte.

Late in the 1997 season, Hostetler returned to the starting lineup after an odd series of events. During a late season Sunday night matchup against Hostetler's former team the Giants, Frerotte scored what would prove to be the Redskins' only touchdown in a 7–7 tie. After he did so, Frerotte walked over to a padded concrete wall in the back of the end zone and headbutted it, causing a neck injury that ended his season. Hostetler finished the game and then started the remaining three, finishing with a 2–1 record. His loss came at the hands of his former team, as the Giants defeated the Redskins in the penultimate game of the season to win the NFC East championship.

Hostetler retired after the 1998 season, which he spent on injured reserve. He nearly came out of retirement in 1999 after a tryout with the St. Louis Rams where he would have backed up newly signed quarterback Trent Green, who supplanted both Hostetler and Frerotte as the starter in Washington in 1998. However, the Rams instead drafted Ohio State quarterback Joe Germaine in the 1999 NFL draft to serve as their third-stringer and elevating holdover Kurt Warner to second string; Warner would have been third string behind Hostetler had the latter signed with the Rams. It can be argued that the Rams not signing Hostetler helped kick-start The Greatest Show on Turf era due to Green's injury in the subsequent preseason and Warner's unexpected rise to stardom and eventual induction into the Pro Football Hall of Fame.

Hostetler finished with 1,357 of 2,338 completions for 16,430 yards and 94 touchdowns, with 71 interceptions. He also rushed for 1,391 yards and 17 touchdowns. Perhaps most impressive about Hostetler was his ability to perform very well in the post-season. In five playoff games, he completed 72 of 115 passes (62.6 percent) for 1,034 yards, seven touchdowns, no interceptions, and a 112.0 passer rating while going 4–1.

== NFL career statistics ==
Legend
| | Won the Super Bowl |
| **Bold** | Career high |

=== Regular season ===
| Year | Team | Games | | | Passing | | | | | | | | | Rushing | | | | | Sacks | |
| Year | Team | GP | GS | Record | Cmp | Att | Pct | Yds | Y/A | Lng | TD | Int | Rtg | Att | Yds | Avg | Lng | TD | Sck | Yds |
|---|---|---|---|---|---|---|---|---|---|---|---|---|---|---|---|---|---|---|---|---|
| 1985 | NYG | 5 | 0 | 0–0 | 0 | 0 | 0.0 | 0 | 0.0 | 0 | 0 | 0 | 0.0 | 0 | 0 | 0.0 | 0 | 0 | 0 | 0 |
| 1986 | NYG | 13 | 0 | 0–0 | 0 | 0 | 0.0 | 0 | 0.0 | 0 | 0 | 0 | 0.0 | 1 | 1 | 1.0 | 1 | 0 | 0 | 0 |
| 1988 | NYG | 16 | 1 | 1–0 | 16 | 29 | 55.2 | 244 | **8.4** | **85** | 1 | 2 | 65.9 | 5 | -3 | -0.6 | 0 | 0 | 5 | 31 |
| 1989 | NYG | 16 | 1 | 1–0 | 20 | 39 | 51.3 | 294 | 7.5 | 35 | 3 | 2 | 80.5 | 11 | 71 | **6.5** | 19 | 2 | 6 | 37 |
| 1990 | NYG | 16 | 2 | 2–0 | 47 | 87 | 54.0 | 614 | 7.1 | 44 | 3 | 1 | 83.2 | 39 | 190 | 4.9 | 30 | 2 | 9 | 38 |
| 1991 | NYG | 12 | 12 | 7–5 | 179 | 285 | **62.8** | 2,032 | 7.1 | 55 | 5 | 4 | **84.1** | 42 | **273** | **6.5** | **47** | 2 | 20 | 100 |
| 1992 | NYG | 13 | 9 | 5–4 | 103 | 192 | 53.6 | 1,225 | 6.4 | 46 | 8 | 3 | 80.8 | 35 | 172 | 4.9 | 27 | 3 | 24 | 148 |
| 1993 | RAI | 15 | 15 | **10–5** | 236 | 419 | 56.3 | 3,242 | 7.7 | 74 | 14 | 10 | 82.5 | **55** | 202 | 3.7 | 19 | **5** | 38 | 206 |
| 1994 | RAI | 16 | 16 | 9–7 | **263** | **455** | 57.8 | **3,334** | 7.3 | 77 | 20 | **16** | 80.8 | 46 | 159 | 3.5 | 14 | 2 | **41** | **232** |
| 1995 | OAK | 11 | 11 | 7–4 | 172 | 286 | 60.1 | 1,998 | 7.0 | 80 | 12 | 9 | 82.2 | 31 | 119 | 3.8 | 18 | 0 | 22 | 133 |
| 1996 | OAK | 13 | 13 | 7–6 | 242 | 402 | 60.2 | 2,548 | 6.3 | 62 | **23** | 14 | 83.2 | 37 | 179 | 4.8 | 17 | 1 | 32 | 181 |
| 1997 | WAS | 6 | 3 | 2–1 | 79 | 144 | 54.9 | 899 | 6.2 | 69 | 5 | 10 | 56.5 | 14 | 28 | 2.0 | 11 | 0 | 10 | 52 |
| Career | | 152 | 83 | 51–32 | 1,357 | 2,338 | 58.0 | 16,430 | 7.0 | 85 | 94 | 71 | 80.5 | 316 | 1,391 | 4.4 | 47 | 17 | 207 | 1,158 |

=== Postseason ===
| Year | Team | Games | | | Passing | | | | | | | | | Rushing | | | | | Sacks | |
| Year | Team | GP | GS | Record | Cmp | Att | Pct | Yds | Y/A | Lng | TD | Int | Rtg | Att | Yds | Avg | Lng | TD | Sck | Yds |
|---|---|---|---|---|---|---|---|---|---|---|---|---|---|---|---|---|---|---|---|---|
| 1989 | NYG | 1 | 0 | 0–0 | 0 | 0 | 0.0 | 0 | 0.0 | 0 | 0 | 0 | 0.0 | 0 | 0 | 0.0 | 0 | 0 | 0 | 0 |
| 1990 | NYG | 3 | 3 | **3–0** | **45** | **76** | 59.2 | 510 | 6.7 | 25 | 3 | 0 | 92.5 | **15** | **64** | **4.3** | 11 | **1** | **7** | **34** |
| 1993 | RAI | 2 | 2 | 1–1 | 27 | 39 | **69.2** | **524** | **13.4** | **86** | **4** | 0 | **146.0** | 9 | 34 | 3.8 | **12** | 0 | 4 | 18 |
| Career | | 6 | 5 | 4–1 | 72 | 115 | 62.6 | 1,034 | 9.0 | 86 | 7 | 0 | 112.0 | 24 | 98 | 4.1 | 12 | 1 | 11 | 52 |

== Personal life ==
Hostetler now lives in Morgantown, West Virginia, and owns a construction company. Hostetler is a descendant of the Amish-Mennonite immigrant, Jacob Hochstetler, member of the Northkill Amish Settlement, the first identifiable Amish settlement in the United States. With his wife, Vicky (daughter of his college coach, Don Nehlen), he has three sons. Hostetler graduated with a 3.85 GPA and a degree in finance from West Virginia University. His nephew is Ryan Nehlen, who played wide receiver for the West Virginia Mountaineers.

Chris Cuomo of ABC News interviewed Hostetler as part of One Moment in Time: The Life of Whitney Houston, a two-hour special on ABC shortly after the 2012 death of singer Whitney Houston. In Super Bowl XXV, Houston performed "The Star-Spangled Banner", and Hostetler and Super Bowl XXV MVP Ottis Anderson reflected on Houston's performance in that game.

He is the uncle of former Buffalo Bills tight-end Jonathan Stupar and former New York Giants linebacker Nate Stupar.
