= Joey Smith (American football) =

American football player (1969–)

No. 88
- Positions: Wide receiver, return specialist

Personal information
- Born: May 30, 1969; Knoxville, Tennessee, U.S.
- Died: May 21, 2024 (aged 54); Knoxville, Tennessee, U.S.
- Listed height: 5 ft 10 in (1.78 m)
- Listed weight: 177 lb (80 kg)

Career information
- High school: Austin-East (Knoxville)
- College: Louisville
- NFL draft: 1991: undrafted

Career history
- New York Giants (1991–1992); → New York/New Jersey Knights (1992); New York Giants (1994)*
- * Offseason or practice squad member only
- Stats at Pro Football Reference

Joey Leon Smith (May 30, 1969 – May 21, 2024) was an American professional football wide receiver who played for the New York Giants of the National Football League (NFL). He played college football for the Louisville Cardinals.

== Early life ==
Joey Leon Smith was born on May 30, 1969, in Knoxville, Tennessee. He attended Austin-East High School in Knoxville.

== College career ==
Smith enrolled at the University of Louisville to play college football for the Cardinals. He was a four-year letterman from 1987 to 1990, spending his first three years as a safety and his final year as a running back. He recorded two interceptions in 1987 and one interception in 1989. As a senior in 1990, Smith totaled 32 carries for 82 yards, three receptions for 22 yards, 19 kick returns for 372 yards, and 29 punt returns for 382 yards.

== Professional career ==
After going undrafted in the 1991 NFL draft, Smith signed with the New York Giants on June 4. He was released on August 26, signed to the practice squad on August 28, promoted to the active roster on November 11, released again on November 24, and signed to the practice squad again on November 26. Overall, he played in one game during the 1991 season as a reserve wide receiver and returned three kicks for 34 yards.

On February 20, 1992, the Giants allocated Smith to the World League of American Football to play for the New York/New Jersey Knights. He was released by the Knights on March 9, 1992, before ever playing for them. Smith appeared in 16 games, starting one, for the Giants during the 1992 NFL season, recording three catches for 45 yards on nine targets and 30 kick returns for 564 yards. He led the team in kick return yards. He was released on August 30, 1993, after the final game of the 1993 preseason.

Smith signed with the Giants again on March 10, 1994, this time to play safety. He was released on August 16, 1994, after the third of five preseason games.

== Post-playing career ==
Smith was a defensive backs and linebackers coach at East Stroudsburg University for 14 years. In 2014, he served as the defensive coordinator and assistant head coach for the Brooklyn Bolts of the Fall Experimental Football League. He was the defensive coordinator for the Cedar Rapids Titans of the Indoor Football League from 2015 to 2016. Smith was the defensive coordinator and defensive backs coach for the Jacksonville Sharks of the National Arena League (NAL) in 2017. On June 20, 2017, before the start of the NAL playoffs, Smith was dismissed despite the team having an 11–1 record.

Smith died on May 21, 2024, in Knoxville. His family donated his brain to the UNITE Brain Bank, where he was diagnosed with CTE.
