= Mike Fox (American football) =

American football player (born 1967)

No. 93
- Position: Defensive lineman

Personal information
- Born: August 5, 1967 (age 59); Akron, Ohio, U.S.
- Listed height: 6 ft 8 in (2.03 m)
- Listed weight: 285 lb (129 kg)

Career information
- High school: North (Akron, Ohio)
- College: West Virginia
- NFL draft: 1990: 2nd round, 51st overall pick

Career history
- New York Giants (1990–1994); Carolina Panthers (1995–1998)

Awards and highlights
- Super Bowl champion (XXV); First-team All-East (1989)

Career NFL statistics
- Sacks: 17
- FF / FR: 4 / 1
- Stats at Pro Football Reference

Michael James Fox (born August 5, 1967) is an American former professional football player who was a defensive lineman in the National Football League (NFL). He was selected by the New York Giants in the second round (51st overall) of the 1990 NFL draft. He played college football for the West Virginia Mountaineers.

He also played for the Carolina Panthers.

== College career ==
In 1989, Fox finished the year with 10 sacks while playing defensive tackle, making him the only player at the time to generate ten sacks from any position other than defensive end or linebacker. Fox had three multi-sack games, including the Syracuse game in which he recorded nine tackles, two sacks, and two tackles for a loss. Fox also finished with 71 tackles and the Gator Bowl MVP trophy. At the end of the 1989 season, he played for the East team in the East-West Shrine Game. He was also named to the Associated Press (AP) All-East first-team.

== Professional career ==
Fox was selected in the second round (51st overall) of the 1990 NFL draft by the New York Giants.

In 1995, Fox signed a five-year contract with the Carolina Panthers.

In 1999, Fox was placed in the 1999 NFL expansion draft by the Panthers. After not being selected by the Cleveland Browns in the expansion draft, he was cut by the Panthers.
