= Odessa Turner =

American football player (born 1964)

No. 83, 86, 80
- Position: Wide receiver

Personal information
- Born: October 12, 1964 (age 62); Monroe, Louisiana, U.S.
- Listed height: 6 ft 3 in (1.91 m)
- Listed weight: 205 lb (93 kg)

Career information
- High school: Wossman (Monroe)
- College: Northwestern State
- NFL draft: 1987: 4th round, 112th overall pick

Career history
- New York Giants (1987–1991); San Francisco 49ers (1992–1993); Ottawa Rough Riders (1995)

Awards and highlights
- Super Bowl champion (XXV)

Career NFL statistics
- Receptions: 97
- Receiving yards: 1,479
- Touchdowns: 8
- Stats at Pro Football Reference

Odessa Turner (born October 12, 1964) is an American former professional football player who was a wide receiver in the National Football League (NFL) for seven seasons for the New York Giants and the San Francisco 49ers. He played college football for the Northwestern State Demons and was selected in the fourth round of the 1987 NFL draft.

Turner also played for the Ottawa Rough Riders of the Canadian Football League after his NFL career.
