= Brian Williams (center) =

American football player (born 1966)

No. 59
- Position: Center

Personal information
- Born: June 8, 1966 (age 60); Mt. Lebanon, Pennsylvania, U.S.
- Listed height: 6 ft 5 in (1.96 m)
- Listed weight: 315 lb (143 kg)

Career information
- High school: Mt. Lebanon
- College: Minnesota
- NFL draft: 1989: 1st round, 18th overall pick

Career history
- New York Giants (1989–1999)

Awards and highlights
- Super Bowl champion (XXV)

Career NFL statistics
- Games played: 129
- Games started: 62
- Fumble recoveries: 1
- Stats at Pro Football Reference

Brian Scott Williams (born June 8, 1966) is an American former professional football player who was a center for the New York Giants of the National Football League (NFL) from 1989 to 1999. He played college football at the University of Minnesota and was selected in the first round (18th overall) of the 1989 NFL draft.

Williams is the oldest son of Robert Williams, a former quarterback at the University of Notre Dame who was also drafted in the NFL by the Chicago Bears in the 1959 NFL draft. Williams has a son, Maxx, who last played tight end for the Arizona Cardinals.

== See also ==
- History of the New York Giants (1979–93)
- History of the New York Giants (1994–present)
