= Bob Kratch =

American football player (born 1966)

No. 61
- Position: Guard

Personal information
- Born: January 6, 1966 (age 60); Brooklyn, New York, U.S.
- Listed height: 6 ft 3 in (1.91 m)
- Listed weight: 288 lb (131 kg)

Career information
- High school: Mahwah (Mahwah, New Jersey)
- College: Iowa
- NFL draft: 1989: 3rd round, 64th overall pick

Career history
- New York Giants (1989–1993); New England Patriots (1994–1996)

Awards and highlights
- Super Bowl champion (XXV); 2× First-team All-Big Ten (1986, 1988)

Career NFL statistics
- Games played: 105
- Games started: 71
- Stats at Pro Football Reference

Robert Kratch (born January 6, 1966) is an American former professional football player who was a guard in the National Football League (NFL) for the New York Giants and New England Patriots. He was selected in the third round of the 1989 NFL draft. He played college football at the University of Iowa for the Hawkeyes.

He lives in New Smyrna Beach, Florida with his wife, Kristi, and three children — Colby, 24, Nate, 22, and Mackenzie, 19. His son, Nate, plays basketball at Santa Clara University. His other son, Colby, was a tight end at Toledo University. He is a substitute teacher at New Smyrna Beach Middle School. He and his family own and operate Mudd Lake Furniture and The Roof In St Bonifacius, Minnesota.
