= Dale Hamer =

American football official (1937–2024)

Dale L. Hamer (September 12, 1937 – November 29, 2024) was an American football official in the National Football League (NFL) who served from 1978 to 2001, with a break taken for health reasons during the 1995 season. During his 23 seasons in the NFL, Hamer was assigned to officiate in two Super Bowls, as a head linesman in Super Bowl XVII and in Super Bowl XXII. Additionally, he was an alternate referee for Super Bowl XXVII. He was married to Arden Hamer. Soon he became the father of Megan Hamer and Lisa Hamer. And grandfather of JJ, Ellie, Miles, and Arden.

== Life and career ==
Hamer was born on September 12, 1937. in Fairhope, Pennsylvania. His career in the NFL started in 1978 as a head linesman. He was later promoted to referee in 1989 upon the retirement of long-time referee Fred Silva. In 1995, Hamer was forced to take a leave from officiating when doctors discovered that he had a heart murmur. Further tests revealed that Hamer had stenosis and calcification of his aortic heart valve, and it would need to be replaced. In July 1995, Dale received a pericardial tissue heart valve. As a result, he missed the entire 1995 NFL season, but returned at the start of the 1996 NFL season after Gordon McCarter announced his retirement. He returned to the head linesman position in 1998 and worked on the crews of Larry Nemmers and Bernie Kukar. After retiring as an on-field official following the 2001 NFL season, Hamer assumed new duties as an instant replay official for the NFL.

Hamer, who wore uniform number 104, was a past president of the National Football League Referees Association.

Hamer was a 1960 graduate of California State College in Western Pennsylvania (now California University of Pennsylvania), and in the early 1960s taught algebra at Clairton High School in Clairton, Pennsylvania.

Hamer died on November 29, 2024, at the age of 87.
