= Myron Guyton =

American football player (born 1967)

No. 29
- Position: Safety

Personal information
- Born: August 26, 1967 (age 59); Metcalf, Georgia, U.S.
- Listed height: 6 ft 1 in (1.85 m)
- Listed weight: 205 lb (93 kg)

Career information
- High school: Thomas County Central (Thomasville, Georgia)
- College: Eastern Kentucky
- NFL draft: 1989: 8th round, 218th overall pick

Career history
- New York Giants (1989–1993); New England Patriots (1994–1995)

Awards and highlights
- Super Bowl champion (XXV)

Career NFL statistics
- Tackles: 499
- Forced fumbles: 2
- Interceptions: 10
- Stats at Pro Football Reference

Myron Maynard Guyton (born August 26, 1967) is an American former professional football player who was a defensive back in the National Football League (NFL) for the New York Giants (1989–1993) and the New England Patriots (1994–1995). He was a member of the Giants team that won Super Bowl XXV. Before his NFL career, he played college football for the Eastern Kentucky Colonels and was selected by the Giants in the eighth round of the 1989 NFL draft. Guyton is a member of Phi Beta Sigma fraternity, Iota Delta chapter of Eastern Kentucky University.

On April 16, 2012, Guyton was among four former NFL players filing a lawsuit claiming the league did not properly protect players from concussions.

Guyton was inducted into the Kentucky Pro Football Hall of Fame in 2016.

Myron Guyton was a regular guest on the Bleedbigblue Podcast where he covered The New York Football Giants and other NFL topics.
