= Eric Dorsey =

American football player (born 1964)

No. 77
- Position: Defensive end

Personal information
- Born: August 5, 1964 (age 62); Washington, D.C., U.S.
- Listed height: 6 ft 5 in (1.96 m)
- Listed weight: 280 lb (127 kg)

Career information
- High school: McLean (McLean, Virginia)
- College: Notre Dame
- NFL draft: 1986: 1st round, 19th overall pick

Career history
- New York Giants (1986–1992)

Awards and highlights
- 2× Super Bowl champion (XXI, XXV)

Career NFL statistics
- Sacks: 7
- Fumble recoveries: 3
- Stats at Pro Football Reference

Eric Hall Dorsey (born August 5, 1964) is an American former professional football player who was a defensive end for seven seasons in the National Football League (NFL).

He started in Super Bowl XXV for the New York Giants. He played college football for the Notre Dame Fighting Irish and was selected in the first round of the 1986 NFL draft with the 19th overall pick. He was a standout at McLean High School (McLean, Virginia), where he anchored their 10-1 1980 team, playing almost every position his senior year and becoming the most heavily recruited player in school history.

In 2011, he was inducted into the McLean High School Hall of Fame but didn't attend the induction ceremony.

== See also ==
- History of the New York Giants (1979-1993)
