= Eric Moore (offensive lineman) =

American football player (born 1965)

No. 60, 62, 70
- Position: Guard

Personal information
- Born: January 28, 1965 (age 61); Berkeley, Missouri, U.S.
- Listed height: 6 ft 5 in (1.96 m)
- Listed weight: 290 lb (132 kg)

Career information
- High school: Berkeley
- College: Indiana
- NFL draft: 1988: 1st round, 10th overall pick

Career history
- New York Giants (1988–1993); Cincinnati Bengals (1994); Cleveland Browns (1995); Miami Dolphins (1995)

Awards and highlights
- Super Bowl champion (XXV); PFWA All-Rookie Team (1988); Second-team All-Big Ten (1987)

Career NFL statistics
- Games played: 84
- Games started: 74
- Fumble recoveries: 3
- Stats at Pro Football Reference

Eric Patrick Moore (born January 28, 1965) is an American former professional football player who was a guard in the National Football League (NFL) for the New York Giants (1988–1993), the Cincinnati Bengals (1994), the Cleveland Browns (1995) and the Miami Dolphins (1995). Moore was selected in the first round (tenth overall) of the 1988 NFL draft. He was a starter for the Giants in their Super Bowl XXV triumph.

In 1993, Moore was sentenced to a six-month pretrial diversion program for steroid possession along with former New York Giants teammate Mark Duckens. They were described by federal agents as "pawns in international steroid ring." Moore was also suspended for the first four weeks of the 1993 NFL season.

Moore lived in the Wolf Creek subdivision in Macon, Georgia for a while and his nickname in college was "PK".
