= Doug Riesenberg =

American football player (born 1965)

No. 72, 79
- Position: Offensive tackle

Personal information
- Born: July 23, 1965 (age 61); Carroll, Iowa, U.S.
- Listed height: 6 ft 5 in (1.96 m)
- Listed weight: 280 lb (127 kg)

Career information
- High school: Moscow (Moscow, Idaho)
- College: California
- NFL draft: 1987: 6th round, 168th overall pick

Career history
- New York Giants (1987–1995); Tampa Bay Buccaneers (1996)

Awards and highlights
- Super Bowl champion (XXV)

Career NFL statistics
- Games played: 145
- Games started: 132
- Fumble recoveries: 7
- Stats at Pro Football Reference

Douglas John Riesenberg (born July 23, 1965) is an American former professional football player who was an offensive tackle in the National Football League (NFL) for the New York Giants and Tampa Bay Buccaneers, and started in Super Bowl XXV. He played college football for the California Golden Bears.

Born in Carroll, Iowa, Riesenberg moved to Moscow, Idaho, before his freshman year of high school. At Moscow High School, he was an all-state football player for the Bears on both offense and defense, an all-state basketball player, and a three-time state champion in the discus. His father, Louis, a professor at the University of Idaho since 1979, was the chairman of the agricultural education department.

After being heavily recruited by colleges from coast to coast, Riesenberg attended the University of California, Berkeley, to study electrical engineering and computer science. He played defense and moved to offense for his senior season in 1986 for the Golden Bears. He was selected in the sixth round of the 1987 NFL draft by the New York Giants.

Riesenberg later attended Oregon State University in Corvallis to complete his engineering and education studies in 2005. He coached offensive line at Redwood High School (Larkspur) (helping the Giants to win MCAL titles in 1998 and 2000, also serving as the offensive coordinator for the latter) for four years at Corvallis High School, and two years at Philomath High School. Riesenberg is now a math teacher and offensive line coach at Crescent Valley High School in Corvallis.
