= Lewis Tillman (American football) =

American football player (born 1966)

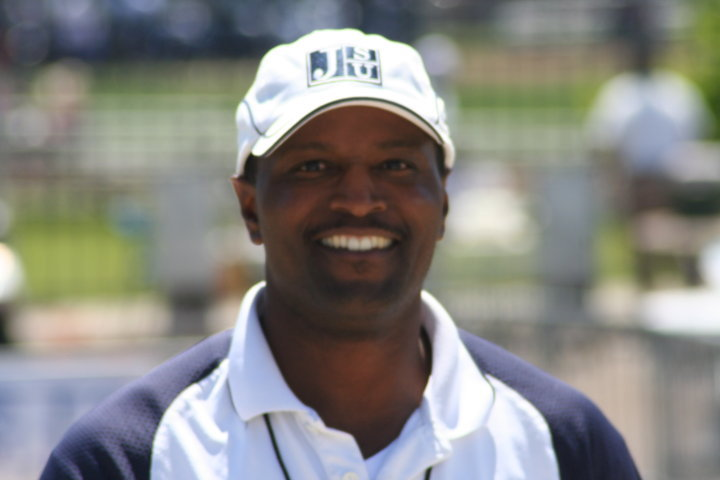

No. 34, 27
- Position: Running back

Personal information
- Born: April 16, 1966 (age 60); Hazlehurst, Mississippi, U.S.
- Listed height: 6 ft 0 in (1.83 m)
- Listed weight: 204 lb (93 kg)

Career information
- High school: Hazlehurst
- College: Jackson State
- NFL draft: 1989: 4th round, 93rd overall pick

Career history
- New York Giants (1989–1993); Chicago Bears (1994–1995)

Awards and highlights
- Super Bowl champion (XXV)

Career NFL statistics
- Rushing yards: 2,383
- Rushing average: 3.6
- Touchdowns: 12
- Stats at Pro Football Reference

Lewis Darnell Tillman (born April 16, 1966) is an American former professional football player who was a running back in the National Football League (NFL). He played for seven seasons for the New York Giants and the Chicago Bears. He played college football for the Jackson State Tigers and was selected 93rd overall in the fourth round of the 1989 NFL draft.

On January 31, 2012, it was announced that Tillman would be the new running backs coach for the Texas Southern Tigers.

== NFL Running Back 7yrs ==
- New York Giants 5 years (1989–1993)
- Chicago Bears 2 years (1994–1995)
- Tillman was selected in the 4th round in 1989 by the NY Giants.
- He spent five years as a running back and special teams player for the Giants.
- He also was part the NY Giants Super Bowl Championship team in 1991.
- He spent two seasons with the Chicago Bears where he was the leading rusher in 1994.
- Prior to the NFL, Tillman enjoyed a great career at Jackson State University where he broke Walter Payton's school career rushing record with 3,989 yards.
- He was a two-time Kodak All-American and Walter Camp All-American.
- In addition to being named the SWAC Offensive Player of the Year in 1987, he won the MVP award in both the East-West Shrine and Blue-Gray All-Star games.
- Since retiring from the NFL, Tillman has coached for 18 years on the high school and collegiate level.
