= Reyna Thompson =

American football player (born 1963)

No. 19, 24, 21
- Position: Cornerback

Personal information
- Born: August 28, 1963 (age 63); Dallas, Texas, U.S.
- Listed height: 6 ft 0 in (1.83 m)
- Listed weight: 194 lb (88 kg)

Career information
- High school: Thomas Jefferson (Dallas)
- College: Baylor
- NFL draft: 1986: 9th round, 247th overall pick

Career history
- Miami Dolphins (1986–1988); New York Giants (1989–1992); New England Patriots (1993)

Awards and highlights
- Super Bowl champion (XXV); Pro Bowl (1990)

Career NFL statistics
- Interceptions: 3
- Fumble recoveries: 1
- Touchdowns: 1
- Stats at Pro Football Reference

Reyna Onald Thompson (born August 28, 1963) is an American former professional football player who was a defensive back in the National Football League (NFL). He went to the Pro Bowl after the 1990 season as a special teams player with the New York Giants. He played college football for the Baylor Bears and was selected by the Miami Dolphins in the ninth round of the 1986 NFL draft with the 247th overall pick.

Thompson was a star football player in high school at Thomas Jefferson H.S. in Dallas. This led to him receiving a football and track scholarship to Baylor University where he earned his degree in communications. Thompson qualified for the Olympics for hurdles but was then drafted to the Miami Dolphins in 1986. After 9 seasons in the NFL, he retired.

Currently, he is teaching high school English in the Palm Beach County School District. Reyna Thompson is married to Nadine Thompson and together they raised eight children. In 2015, he served as head football coach for West Broward High School, leading the Bobcats to its first District playoff in the school's history. He also served as the head coach for Hollywood Hills High School football team. Reyna has dedicated his post NFL career to educating and coaching. During this time he has contributed to assisting several student in obtaining athletic scholarships.
