= William Roberts (American football) =

American football player (born 1962)

No. 66, 76, 69
- Positions: Guard, tackle

Personal information
- Born: August 5, 1962 (age 64); Miami, Florida, U.S.
- Listed height: 6 ft 5 in (1.96 m)
- Listed weight: 291 lb (132 kg)

Career information
- High school: Miami Carol City (Miami Gardens, Florida)
- College: Ohio State
- NFL draft: 1984: 1st round, 27th overall pick

Career history
- New York Giants (1984–1994); New England Patriots (1995–1996); New York Jets (1997)

Awards and highlights
- 2× Super Bowl champion (XXI, XXV); Pro Bowl (1990); 80th greatest New York Giant of all-time; Second-team All-American (1983); 2× Second-team All-Big Ten (1982, 1983)

Career NFL statistics
- Games Played: 195
- Games Started: 154
- Fumble recoveries: 4
- Stats at Pro Football Reference

William Harold Roberts (born August 5, 1962) is an American former professional football player who was an offensive lineman for 13 seasons in the National Football League (NFL) for the New York Giants, New England Patriots and New York Jets. He played college football for the Ohio State Buckeyes.

== Biography ==
Roberts was born in Miami, Florida, and attended Miami Carol City Senior High School. He played collegiately at Ohio State University, where, as a senior, he was named a second-team All-American by both Football News and Gannett News Service (GNS).

Roberts was selected in the first round of the 1984 NFL draft (27th overall) by the New York Giants. After appearing in 8 games at offensive tackle for the Giants in his rookie year, Roberts missed the entire 1985 season due to injury before establishing himself as a regular starter for the Giants in 1987. He moved to the guard position in 1989.

Roberts was selected to the Pro Bowl after the 1990 season, and played in 3 Super Bowls during his career, winning Super Bowl XXI and XXV with the New York Giants, and appearing in Super Bowl XXXI with the New England Patriots. Roberts retired after the 1997 season after a 13-year NFL career, having played in 195 games, with 154 as a starter.
