= 1986 New York Giants season =

NFL team 62nd season (won Super Bowl)

- Owner: Wellington Mara
- General manager: George Young
- Head coach: Bill Parcells
- Offensive coordinator: Ron Erhardt
- Defensive coordinator: Bill Belichick
- Home stadium: Giants Stadium

Results
- Record: 14–2
- Division place: 1st NFC East
- Playoffs: Won Divisional Playoffs (vs. 49ers) 49–3; Won NFC Championship (vs. Redskins) 17–0; Won Super Bowl XXI (vs. Broncos) 39–20
- Pro Bowlers: 8: TE Mark Bavaro; T Brad Benson; NTJim Burt; LB Harry Carson; P Sean Landeta; DE Leonard Marshall; RB Joe Morris; LB Lawrence Taylor

The 1986 season was the New York Giants' 62nd in the National Football League (NFL) and their fourth under head coach Bill Parcells. The New York Giants, who play in the National Football Conference (NFC) of the National Football League (NFL), won their fifth championship—and first Super Bowl—in franchise history during the season. Led by consensus league Most Valuable Player (MVP) linebacker Lawrence Taylor and Super Bowl MVP quarterback Phil Simms, the Giants posted a 14–2 record during the regular season, tied for the best record in the league with the defending Super Bowl champion Chicago Bears. The Giants improved on their 10–6 record from 1985, won their first division championship since the NFL-AFL merger in 1970, and won Super Bowl XXI against the Denver Broncos.

In the playoffs, the Giants, who were the top seed in the conference ahead of the Bears, defeated the San Francisco 49ers for the second consecutive year in the playoffs by a score of 49–3. The Giants then disposed of the Washington Redskins, in the NFC Championship Game 17–0. In Super Bowl XXI, behind Simms' 88% pass completion percentage and their strong defense, the Giants overcame a 10–9 halftime deficit and scored thirty second-half points while allowing only ten more and defeated the Broncos 39–20.

After making the playoffs in 1984 and 1985, the Giants entered the 1986 season as one of the favorites to win the Super Bowl. They began the season with a 31–28 loss to the Dallas Cowboys, before winning five consecutive games. After losing 17–12 to the Seattle Seahawks in week seven, the Giants won their final nine regular season games. Following the regular season, coach Bill Parcells won the NFL Coach of the Year Award, and eight Giants were named to the Pro Bowl. The Giants' defense, nicknamed the Big Blue Wrecking Crew, finished second in the league in points and yards allowed.

The 1986 Giants had been ranked as one of the greatest NFL teams of all time by fans, and members of the media. The Giants also ranked #12 on the 100 greatest teams of all time presented by the NFL on its 100th anniversary. It was this Giants team that popularized the practice of the "Gatorade shower", which entailed the players dousing members of the coaching staff with Gatorade near the end of a victorious game.

== Off-season ==
After two consecutive playoff seasons, the Giants entered the 1986 season as one of the favorites to win the Super Bowl.

=== Draft ===
The Giants had five selections in the first two rounds of the 1986 NFL draft, as opposed to the normal two, and 14 selections in the 12-round draft overall. Of the draft Giants' general manager George Young said, "This is not a blue-chip draft, but a strong blue-collar draft. A lot of people think there's better quantity than quality." With their first selection they chose defensive end Eric Dorsey #19 overall from the University of Notre Dame. With their four-second-round selections they chose Mark Collins, cornerback out of Cal State-Fullerton, Erik Howard, nose tackle out of Washington State University, Pepper Johnson, linebacker out of Ohio State University, and Greg Lasker, defensive back out of the University of Arkansas.

1986 New York Giants draft
Round	Pick	Player	Position	College	Notes
1	19	Eric Dorsey	DE	Notre Dame	
2	44	Mark Collins	DB	Cal State-Fullerton	
2	46	Erik Howard *	DT	Washington State	
2	51	Pepper Johnson *	LB	Ohio State	
2	53	Greg Lasker	DB	Arkansas	
3	73	John Washington	DE	Oklahoma State	
5	130	Vince Warren	WR	San Diego State	
6	139	Ron Brown	WR	Colorado	
6	157	Solomon Miller	WR	Utah State	
7	184	Jon Francis	RB	Boise State	
8	214	Steve Cisowski	OT	Santa Clara	
9	241	Jim Luebbers	DE	Iowa State	
10	268	Jerry Kimmel	LB	Syracuse	
11	295	Len Lynch	OG	Maryland	
Made roster † Pro Football Hall of Fame * Made at least one Pro Bowl during career

== Personnel ==
=== Staff ===
1986 New York Giants staff
Front office: President – Wellington Mara; General manager – George Young; Director of pro personnel – Tim Rooney; Head coaches: Head coach – Bill Parcells; Offensive coaches: Offensive coordinator – Ron Erhardt; Offensive backfield – Ray Handley; Receivers – Pat Hodgson; Tight ends – Mike Pope; Offensive line – Fred Hoaglin	Defensive coaches: Defensive coordinator – Bill Belichick; Defensive line – Lamar Leachman; Defensive backfield – Len Fontes; Defensive assistant – Mike Sweatman; Special teams coaches: Special teams – Romeo Crennel; Assistant special teams – Mike Sweatman; Strength and conditioning: Strength and Conditioning – Johnny Parker

=== Roster ===
1986 New York Giants roster
Quarterbacks (QB): 17 Jeff Rutledge; 11 Phil Simms; Running backs (RB): 24 Ottis Anderson; 44 Maurice Carthon; 30 Tony Galbreath; 20 Joe Morris; 22 Lee Rouson; Wide receivers (WR): 88 Bobby Johnson; 80 Phil McConkey; 87 Solomon Miller; 81 Stacy Robinson; Tight ends (TE): 89 Mark Bavaro; 84 Zeke Mowatt	Offensive linemen (OL): 67 Billy Ard G; 60 Brad Benson T; 61 Chris Godfrey G; 68 Damian Johnson G; 59 Brian Johnston C; 63 Karl Nelson T; 65 Bart Oates C; 66 William Roberts T; Defensive linemen (DL): 64 Jim Burt NT; 77 Eric Dorsey DE; 74 Erik Howard NT; 70 Leonard Marshall DE; 75 George Martin DE; 78 Jerome Sally NT; 73 John Washington DE	Linebackers (LB): 58 Carl Banks OLB; 53 Harry Carson ILB; 54 Andy Headen OLB; 57 Byron Hunt OLB; 52 Pepper Johnson ILB; 51 Robbie Jones OLB; 55 Gary Reasons ILB; 56 Lawrence Taylor OLB; Defensive backs (DB): 25 Mark Collins CB; 28 Tom Flynn FS; 48 Kenny Hill SS; 46 Greg Lasker SS; 34 Elvis Patterson CB; 27 Herb Welch FS; 23 Perry Williams CB; Special teams (ST): 2 Raúl Allegre K; 5 Sean Landeta P	Reserve: 33 George Adams RB (IR); 39 Tyrone Davis CB (IR); 15 Jeff Hostetler QB (IR); 69 David Jordan G (IR); 43 Terry Kinard S (IR); 86 Lionel Manuel WR (IR); 76 Curtis McGriff DE (IR); Rookies in italics

=== Depth chart ===
Defense

FS
Terry Kinard
Herb Welch

WLB	ILB	ILB	SLB
Lawrence Taylor	Harry Carson	Gary Reasons	Carl Banks
Byron Hunt	Pepper Johnson	Robbie Jones	⋅

SS
Kenny Hill
Greg Lasker

CB
Mark Collins
Elvis Patterson

DE	NT	DE
Leonard Marshall	Jim Burt	George Martin
John Washington	Erik Howard	Eric Dorsey

CB
Perry Williams
⋅

Offense

WR
Bobby Johnson
Solomon Miller

LT	LG	C	RG	RT
Brad Benson	Billy Ard	Bart Oates	Chris Godfrey	Karl Nelson
William Roberts	⋅	Brian Johnston	Damian Johnson	⋅

TE
Mark Bavaro
Zeke Mowatt

WR
Lionel Manuel
Stacy Robinson

QB
Phil Simms
Jeff Rutledge

RB
Joe Morris
Lee Rouson

FB
Maurice Carthon
Tony Galbreath

Special teams
PK Raúl Allegre
P Sean Landeta
KR Phil McConkey
PR Phil McConkey
LS Bart Oates
H Jeff Rutledge

== Preseason ==
=== Schedule ===
Week	Date	Opponent	Result	Record	Venue	Attendance	Recap
1	August 9	at Atlanta Falcons	L 24–31	0–1	Atlanta–Fulton County Stadium	25,445	Recap
2	August 16	at Green Bay Packers	W 22–14	1–1	Milwaukee County Stadium	41,774	Recap
3	August 23	New York Jets	W 20–16	2–1	Giants Stadium	73,882	Recap
4	August 30	Pittsburgh Steelers	W 17–3	3–1	Giants Stadium	45,441	Recap

== Regular season ==
=== Schedule ===
Week	Date	Opponent	Result	Record	Venue	Attendance	Recap
1	September 8	at Dallas Cowboys	L 28–31	0–1	Texas Stadium	59,804	Recap
2	September 14	San Diego Chargers	W 20–7	1–1	Giants Stadium	74,921	Recap
3	September 21	at Los Angeles Raiders	W 14–9	2–1	Los Angeles Memorial Coliseum	71,164	Recap
4	September 28	New Orleans Saints	W 20–17	3–1	Giants Stadium	72,769	Recap
5	October 5	at St. Louis Cardinals	W 13–6	4–1	Busch Memorial Stadium	40,562	Recap
6	October 12	Philadelphia Eagles	W 35–3	5–1	Giants Stadium	74,221	Recap
7	October 19	at Seattle Seahawks	L 12–17	5–2	Kingdome	62,282	Recap
8	October 27	Washington Redskins	W 27–20	6–2	Giants Stadium	75,923	Recap
9	November 2	Dallas Cowboys	W 17–14	7–2	Giants Stadium	74,871	Recap
10	November 9	at Philadelphia Eagles	W 17–14	8–2	Veterans Stadium	60,601	Recap
11	November 16	at Minnesota Vikings	W 22–20	9–2	Hubert H. Humphrey Metrodome	63,003	Recap
12	November 23	Denver Broncos	W 19–16	10–2	Giants Stadium	75,116	Recap
13	December 1	at San Francisco 49ers	W 21–17	11–2	Candlestick Park	59,777	Recap
14	December 7	at Washington Redskins	W 24–14	12–2	Robert F. Kennedy Memorial Stadium	55,642	Recap
15	December 14	St. Louis Cardinals	W 27–7	13–2	Giants Stadium	75,261	Recap
16	December 20	Green Bay Packers	W 55–24	14–2	Giants Stadium	71,351	Recap

== Game summaries ==
=== Week 1: at Dallas Cowboys ===
The Giants had their first test in the opening week Monday Night Football game against the defending Eastern Division champion Dallas Cowboys. Playing in front of 59,804 fans at Texas Stadium, the Giants lost the opener, 31–28. The teams played fairly evenly statistically; the Giants totalled 416 yards to the Cowboys' 392. Highlights of the game included Cowboys running back Herschel Walker, in his first NFL game, rushing 10 times for 64 yards and the game-winning touchdown, and fellow running back Tony Dorsett scoring on a 36-yard screen pass on the game's opening drive. The Giants struggled at the start of the game; they failed to get a first down on their first three drives, but their offense came alive and scored 28 points in the final three quarters.

Week 1: New York Giants at Dallas Cowboys

Quarter	1	2	3	4	Total
Giants (0–1)	0	14	7	7	28
Cowboys (1–0)	0	17	0	14	31

at Texas Stadium

- Date: September 8, 1986
- Game time: 9:00 p.m. EDT
- Game weather: 71 °F (22 °C), relative humidity 71%, wind 11 mph (18 km/h)
- Game attendance: 59,804
- Referee: Pat Haggerty
- TV announcers (ABC): Al Michaels (play-by-play), Frank Gifford (color commentator)
- Box Score

Scoring summary

Quarter	Time	Drive			Team	Scoring information	Score	
Quarter	Time	Plays	Yards	TOP	Team	Scoring information	Giants	Cowboys
2	9:30				Cowboys	Dorsett 36-yard touchdown reception from White, Septien kick good	0	7
2	6:21				Cowboys	Walker 1-yard touchdown run, Septien kick good	0	14
2	1:49				Giants	Johnson 13-yard touchdown reception from Simms, Thomas kick good	7	14
2	0:25				Giants	Robinson 3-yard touchdown reception from Simms, Thomas kick good	14	14
2	0:00				Cowboys	35-yard field goal by Septien	14	17
3	2:15				Giants	Morris 2-yard touchdown run, Thomas kick good	21	17
4	6:55				Cowboys	Chandler 1-yard touchdown reception from White, Septien kick good	21	24
4	5:24				Giants	Johnson 44-yard touchdown reception from Simms, Thomas kick good	28	24
4	1:16				Cowboys	Walker 10-yard touchdown run, Septien kick good	28	31
"TOP" = time of possession. For other American football terms, see Glossary of American football.							28	31

=== Week 2: vs. San Diego Chargers ===
In week two, the Giants defeated the San Diego Chargers 20–7 in front of 74,921 fans at Giants Stadium. The Giants led the Chargers 10–7 after three-quarters before scoring 10 in the fourth quarter to put the game out of reach. Joe Morris rushed 30 times for 83 yards and defensive backs Terry Kinard and Kenny Hill intercepted two passes each. Chargers quarterback Dan Fouts threw five-second half interceptions. "We took away their outside running game and their short passes", Giants' defensive coordinator Bill Belichick said. "When Fouts tried to go deep, that's when we got interceptions." The Giants dominated the Chargers in time of possession; 39 minutes 44 seconds to the Chargers' 20 minutes 16 seconds. The Giants defense forced eight turnovers overall, and held the Chargers to 41 rushing yards on 13 carries. After the game Fouts complimented the Giants defense, "There was no comparing the Giants' defense with the Dolphins' defense (the Chargers scored 50 points and totalled 500 yards against the Dolphins in week one). We never got anything established against the Giants. Momma said there would be days like this, and she was right."

Week 2: San Diego Chargers at New York Giants

Quarter	1	2	3	4	Total
Chargers (1–1)	0	7	0	0	7
Giants (1–1)	3	7	0	10	20

at Giants Stadium

- Date: September 14, 1986
- Game time: 1:00 p.m. EDT
- Game weather: 65 °F (18 °C), relative humidity 52%, wind 17 mph (27 km/h)
- Game attendance: 74,921
- Referee: Fred Wyant
- TV announcers (NBC): Don Criqui (play-by-play), Bob Trumpy (color commentator)
- Box Score

Scoring summary

Quarter	Time	Drive			Team	Scoring information	Score	
Quarter	Time	Plays	Yards	TOP	Team	Scoring information	Chargers	Giants
1	6:10				Giants	21-yard field goal by Cooper	0	3
2	13:16				Giants	Morris 1-yard touchdown run, Cooper kick good	0	10
2	3:24				Chargers	Anderson 29-yard touchdown reception from Fouts, Benirschke kick good	7	10
4	7:14				Giants	Manuel 12-yard touchdown reception from Simms, Cooper kick good	7	17
4	3:12				Giants	20-yard field goal by Cooper	7	20
"TOP" = time of possession. For other American football terms, see Glossary of American football.							7	20

=== Week 3: at Los Angeles Raiders ===
The Giants played the Los Angeles Raiders in Los Angeles in week three. Joe Morris rushed for 110 yards on 18 carries—the first time in 19 games someone had rushed for 100 yards against the Raiders—and the Giants' defense held the Raiders to three field goals. Raiders running back Marcus Allen was held to 40 yards on 15 carries, ending his then-NFL record 11 game 100 yard rushing streak, and the Giants defeated the Raiders 14–9. The Raiders gained a total of 58 rushing yards, and committed nine penalties. Raiders' quarterback Jim Plunkett completed 21 of 41 passes for 281 yards, and Phil Simms threw touchdown passes of 18 and 11 yards to wide receiver Lionel Manuel.

Week 3: New York Giants at Los Angeles Raiders

Quarter	1	2	3	4	Total
Giants (2–1)	0	0	7	7	14
Raiders (0–3)	6	0	0	3	9

at Los Angeles Memorial Coliseum

- Date: September 21, 1986
- Game time: 4:00 p.m. EDT
- Game weather: 63 °F (17 °C), relative humidity 76%, wind 11 mph (18 km/h)
- Game attendance: 71,164
- Referee: Red Cashion
- TV announcers (CBS): Pat Summerall (play-by-play), John Madden (color commentator), Irv Cross (sideline reporter)
- Box Score

Scoring summary

Quarter	Time	Drive			Team	Scoring information	Score	
Quarter	Time	Plays	Yards	TOP	Team	Scoring information	Giants	Raiders
1	7:15				Raiders	22-yard field goal by Bahr	0	3
1	3:17				Raiders	25-yard field goal by Bahr	0	6
3	7:25				Giants	Manuel 18-yard touchdown reception from Simms, Cooper kick good	7	6
4	12:22				Giants	Manuel 11-yard touchdown reception from Simms, Cooper kick good	14	6
4	5:44				Raiders	33-yard field goal by Bahr	14	9
"TOP" = time of possession. For other American football terms, see Glossary of American football.							14	9

=== Week 4: vs. New Orleans Saints ===
The Giants rallied to beat the New Orleans Saints 20–17 in front of 72,769 fans at Giants Stadium in week four. They came back from a 17–0 second-quarter deficit, by scoring 20 points in the final three-quarters. Rueben Mayes of the Saints returned the second-half kickoff 99 yards for an apparent touchdown only to have the play called back because of an illegal block by linebacker Sam Mills. The decisive points came on Phil Simms's 4-yard touchdown pass to tight end Zeke Mowatt midway through the fourth quarter. The Giants dominated the Saints in time of possession, holding the ball for 38 minutes and 47 seconds to the Saints 21 minutes and 13 seconds.

Week 4: New Orleans Saints at New York Giants

Quarter	1	2	3	4	Total
Saints (1–3)	14	3	0	0	17
Giants (3–1)	0	10	3	7	20

at Giants Stadium

- Date: September 28, 1986
- Game time: 1:00 p.m. EDT
- Game weather: 62 °F (17 °C), relative humidity 67%, wind 9 mph (14 km/h)
- Game attendance: 72,769
- Referee: Bob Frederic
- TV announcers (CBS): Dick Stockton (play-by-play), Dan Dierdorf (color commentator)
- Box Score

Scoring summary

Quarter	Time	Drive			Team	Scoring information	Score	
Quarter	Time	Plays	Yards	TOP	Team	Scoring information	Saints	Giants
1	12:00				Saints	Martin 63-yard touchdown reception from Wilson, Andersen kick good	7	0
1	3:37				Saints	Hilliard 1-yard touchdown run, Andersen kick good	14	0
2	12:47				Saints	27-yard field goal by Andersen	17	0
2	7:10				Giants	29-yard field goal by Allegre	17	3
2	1:20				Giants	Bavaro 19-yard touchdown reception from Simms, Allegre kick good	17	10
3	7:19				Giants	28-yard field goal by Allegre	17	13
4	8:03				Giants	Mowatt 4-yard touchdown reception from Simms, Allegre kick good	17	20
"TOP" = time of possession. For other American football terms, see Glossary of American football.							17	20

=== Week 5: at St. Louis Cardinals ===
The Giants faced the St. Louis Cardinals in St. Louis in their fifth game of the season. The Giants offense struggled, with Morris leading the team with a meager 53 rushing yards and quarterback Phil Simms completing only 8 of 20 passes for 104 yards. Mark Bavaro caught two passes and Bobby Johnson caught two as well, for 55 yards—the only passes caught by a Giants' wide receiver. The game was a defensive struggle that featured 17 punts, four field goals (two by each team), and one touchdown. The Giants won 13–6, and the decisive score was a 1-yard touchdown run by Joe Morris early in the third quarter. The Giants defense held the Cardinals to 2.4 yards per rush attempt and 3.8 yards per pass attempt in the victory.

Week 5: New York Giants at St. Louis Cardinals

Quarter	1	2	3	4	Total
Giants (4–1)	0	6	7	0	13
Cardinals (0–5)	3	0	3	0	6

at Busch Stadium

- Date: October 5, 1986
- Game time: 1:00 p.m. EDT
- Game weather: 60 °F (16 °C), relative humidity 70%, wind 11 mph (18 km/h)
- Game attendance: 40,562
- Referee: Chuck Heberling
- TV announcers (CBS): Gary Bender (play-by-play), Hank Stram (color commentator)
- Box Score

Scoring summary

Quarter	Time	Drive			Team	Scoring information	Score	
Quarter	Time	Plays	Yards	TOP	Team	Scoring information	Giants	Cardinals
1	8:37				Cardinals	31-yard field goal by Lee	0	3
2	8:53				Giants	44-yard field goal by Allegre	3	3
2	0:39				Giants	31-yard field goal by Allegre	6	3
3	9:40				Giants	Morris 1-yard touchdown run, Allegre kick good	13	3
3	3:14				Cardinals	47-yard field goal by Lee	13	6
"TOP" = time of possession. For other American football terms, see Glossary of American football.							13	6

=== Week 6: vs. Philadelphia Eagles ===
In week six, the Giants hosted the Eagles at the Meadowlands. Linebacker Harry Carson scored his first career touchdown by catching a pass on a fake field goal in the third quarter, and the Giants defense sacked Eagles' quarterbacks Ron Jaworski and Randall Cunningham three times each. The Giants won 35–3; their largest margin of victory since they defeated the Seattle Seahawks, 32–0, in 1981. The Giants defense held the Eagles to 58 total yards, and Lawrence Taylor had four sacks and seven tackles. The sack total was Taylor's highest single game total since the 1984 season. The Giants dominated in time of possession; they held the ball for 39 minutes and 33 seconds to the Eagles 20 minutes and 27 seconds. Simms completed 20 of 29 passes for 214 yards and two touchdowns and ran for another touchdown.

Week 6: Philadelphia Eagles at New York Giants

Quarter	1	2	3	4	Total
Eagles (2–4)	0	3	0	0	3
Giants (5–1)	0	14	14	7	35

at Giants Stadium

- Date: October 12, 1986
- Game time: 4:00 p.m. EDT
- Game weather: 55 °F (13 °C), relative humidity 78%, wind 12 mph (19 km/h)
- Game attendance: 74,221
- Referee: Jerry Markbreit
- TV announcers (CBS): Dick Stockton (play-by-play), Dan Dierdorf (color commentator)
- Box Score

Scoring summary

Quarter	Time	Drive			Team	Scoring information	Score	
Quarter	Time	Plays	Yards	TOP	Team	Scoring information	Eagles	Giants
2	13:28				Giants	Morris 30-yard touchdown run, Allegre kick good	0	7
2	5:18				Eagles	29-yard field goal by McFadden	3	7
2	0:59				Giants	Simms 4-yard touchdown run, Allegre kick good	3	14
3	7:15				Giants	Miller 10-yard touchdown reception from Simms, Allegre kick good	3	21
3	0:40				Giants	Carson 13-yard touchdown reception from Rutledge, Allegre kick good	3	28
4	10:43				Giants	Rouson 37-yard touchdown reception from Simms, Allegre kick good	3	35
"TOP" = time of possession. For other American football terms, see Glossary of American football.							3	35

=== Week 7: at Seattle Seahawks ===
The Giants allowed six sacks in their week seven 17–12 loss to the Seattle Seahawks. Seahawks defensive end Jacob Green outplayed offensive tackle Karl Nelson and recorded a career-high four sacks. Phil Simms threw four interceptions but coach Bill Parcells denied he was struggling, "[y]ou'd like not to take a sack in the scoring zone, but sometimes it's hard to know when to throw it away. Two of Phil's interceptions were rebounds that had nothing to do with the quarterback. On the interception on fourth and 14 at the end, he was trying to make a play. I think I would have thrown there, too. The other interception was his mistake. I don't think he's in a slump."

Week 7: New York Giants at Seattle Seahawks

Quarter	1	2	3	4	Total
Giants (5–2)	0	9	0	3	12
Seahawks (5–2)	7	0	3	7	17

at Kingdome

- Date: October 19, 1986
- Game time: 4:00 p.m. EDT
- Game weather: indoors (dome)
- Game attendance: 62,282
- Referee: Gene Barth
- TV announcers (CBS): Pat Summerall (play-by-play), John Madden (color commentator)
- Box Score

Scoring summary

Quarter	Time	Drive			Team	Scoring information	Score	
Quarter	Time	Plays	Yards	TOP	Team	Scoring information	Giants	Seahawks
1	7:51				Seahawks	Hudson 16-yard touchdown reception from Krieg, Johnson kick good	0	7
2	11:50				Giants	Miller 32-yard touchdown reception from Simms, Allegre kick no good	6	7
2	0:41				Giants	23-yard field goal by Allegre	9	7
3	7:03				Seahawks	25-yard field goal by Johnson	9	10
4	10:00				Seahawks	Warner 1-yard touchdown run, Johnson kick good	9	17
4	4:42				Giants	31-yard field goal by Allegre	12	17
"TOP" = time of possession. For other American football terms, see Glossary of American football.							12	17

=== Week 8: vs. Washington Redskins ===
The Giants improved to 6-2 and moved into a tie with Washington for the division lead after defeating them on the same night the New York Mets won the 1986 World Series at Shea Stadium. Fans attending the football game brought portable televisions and spent much of the time reacting to the baseball game, leading to a Redskins false start in one instance. With the teams tied 20–20, Joe Morris scored the game-winning touchdown on a 13-yard run with 98 seconds remaining. The Giants offense featured a two tight end formation throughout much of the game which allowed them to run the ball more effectively. The Giants used Mark Bavaro and Zeke Mowatt throughout much of the game, sometimes even lining them up on the same side. Morris finished the game with 181 yards. Redskins quarterback Jay Schroeder threw for 420 yards in the loss.

Week 8: Washington Redskins at New York Giants

Quarter	1	2	3	4	Total
Redskins (6–2)	0	3	14	3	20
Giants (6–2)	3	10	7	7	27

at Giants Stadium

- Date: October 27, 1986
- Game time: 9:00 p.m. EST
- Game weather: 52 °F (11 °C), relative humidity 97%, wind 14 mph (23 km/h)
- Game attendance: 75,923
- Referee: Jerry Seeman
- TV announcers (ABC): Al Michaels (play-by-play), Frank Gifford (color commentator)
- Box Score

Scoring summary

Quarter	Time	Drive			Team	Scoring information	Score	
Quarter	Time	Plays	Yards	TOP	Team	Scoring information	Redskins	Giants
1	10:00				Giants	37-yard field goal by Allegre	0	3
2	12:28				Giants	Morris 11-yard touchdown run, Allegre kick good	0	10
2	3:21				Redskins	23-yard field goal by Zendejas	3	10
2	0:00				Giants	44-yard field goal by Allegre	3	13
3	9:04				Giants	Johnson 25-yard touchdown reception from Simms, Allegre kick good	3	20
3	6:57				Redskins	Rogers 1-yard touchdown run, Zendejas kick good	10	20
3	4:12				Redskins	Clark 42-yard touchdown reception from Schroeder, Zendejas kick good	17	20
4	4:06				Redskins	29-yard field goal by Zendejas	20	20
4	1:38				Giants	Morris 13-yard touchdown run, Allegre kick good	20	27
"TOP" = time of possession. For other American football terms, see Glossary of American football.							20	27

=== Week 9: vs. Dallas Cowboys ===
The Giants played the Cowboys at Giants Stadium in week nine. Defensive end George Martin recorded a late sack, termed by head coach Bill Parcells as the biggest play of the game, to help the Giants to a 17–14 victory. The Giants held running backs Tony Dorsett to 45 yards in 10 carries and Herschel Walker to 34 yards in 10 carries. The Cowboys outgained the Giants 408 to 245 in total yardage, and had 25 first downs compared with the Giants' 14. Phil Simms struggled and completed only 6 of 18 passes for 67 yards, but Joe Morris rushed 29 times for 181 yards and two touchdowns as the Giants improved to 7–2.

Week 9: Dallas Cowboys at New York Giants

Quarter	1	2	3	4	Total
Cowboys (6–3)	0	7	0	7	14
Giants (7–2)	3	7	0	7	17

at Giants Stadium

- Date: November 2, 1986
- Game time: 1:00 p.m. EST
- Game weather: 59 °F (15 °C), relative humidity 83%, wind 14 mph (23 km/h)
- Game attendance: 74,871
- Referee: Dick Hantak
- TV announcers (CBS): Pat Summerall (play-by-play), John Madden (color commentator)
- Box Score

Scoring summary

Quarter	Time	Drive			Team	Scoring information	Score	
Quarter	Time	Plays	Yards	TOP	Team	Scoring information	Cowboys	Giants
1	2:29				Giants	25-yard field goal by Allegre	0	3
2	11:00				Cowboys	Renfro 11-yard touchdown reception from Pelluer, Septien kick good	7	3
2	6:24				Giants	Morris 8-yard touchdown run, Allegre kick good	7	10
4	12:24				Giants	Morris 6-yard touchdown run, Allegre kick good	7	17
4	7:29				Cowboys	Dorsett 23-yard touchdown run, Septien kick good	14	17
"TOP" = time of possession. For other American football terms, see Glossary of American football.							14	17

=== Week 10: at Philadelphia Eagles ===
In week 10, the Giants then travelled to Philadelphia to play the Eagles. In a physical game marked by several scuffles, the Giants passing game struggled as several receivers played with injuries, and quarterback Phil Simms completed only one pass to a wide receiver; a 17-yarder to Solomon Miller. Coach Bill Parcells placed the blame for the passing game's performance on dropped passes by the receivers. "You can't throw the ball much better than Phil did yesterday", commented Parcells. "But he didn't have the numbers to show for it." The Eagles rushed for 153 yards and outgained the Giants 265 to 237 in total yards. The Giants won 17–14 nonetheless despite Simms completing only 14 of 36 passes overall. The Giants rode their running attack as Joe Morris passed the 100 yard mark for the fourth consecutive game; Morris totalled 116, 181, 181 and 111 yards in that period. Lawrence Taylor recorded three sacks of the Giants defense seven sacks in the victory.

Week 10: New York Giants at Philadelphia Eagles

Quarter	1	2	3	4	Total
Giants (8–2)	0	10	7	0	17
Eagles (3–7)	0	0	0	14	14

at Veterans Stadium

- Date: November 9, 1986
- Game time: 4:00 p.m. EST
- Game weather: 64 °F (18 °C), relative humidity 93%, wind 12 mph (19 km/h)
- Game attendance: 60,601
- Referee: Fred Wyant
- TV announcers (CBS): Pat Summerall (play-by-play), John Madden (color commentator)
- Box Score

Scoring summary

Quarter	Time	Drive			Team	Scoring information	Score	
Quarter	Time	Plays	Yards	TOP	Team	Scoring information	Giants	Eagles
2	10:20				Giants	Morris 18-yard touchdown run, Allegre kick good	7	0
2	0:01				Giants	25-yard field goal by Allegre	10	0
3	10:04				Giants	Morris 3-yard touchdown run, Allegre kick good	17	0
4	8:49				Eagles	Quick 75-yard touchdown reception from Cunningham, McFadden kick good	17	7
4	0:45				Eagles	Cunningham 4-yard touchdown run, McFadden kick good	17	14
"TOP" = time of possession. For other American football terms, see Glossary of American football.							17	14

=== Week 11: at Minnesota Vikings ===
Trailing the Minnesota Vikings 20–19 with 72 seconds left in the fourth quarter at the Metrodome in week 11, Phil Simms completed a desperate 22-yard pass on fourth and 17 to Bobby Johnson for a first down. The completion led to Raúl Allegre's fifth field goal and an important Giants victory 22–20. In the Giants' three previous games, Simms had completed only six passes to wide receivers. In the Giants' victory he completed eight to wide receivers, four to tight end Mark Bavaro and 13 to his running backs—four to Ottis Anderson in the final two drives, three to Maurice Carthon, three to Joe Morris and three to Tony Galbreath. Simms commented years later, "[i]t's my favorite game in my career, because it's everything I always wanted to be as a player. I wanted to be tough, making big throws, immune to pressure, not worried about outcomes. It was truly like standing on the tee box in golf and there's trees on each side and water and you just go 'Man, I'm gonna rip it down the middle.' And no other thought crosses your mind." The game has frequently been credited as a signature game of their season, and the Giants players celebrated the victory in the tunnel leading to their locker room and in the locker room itself in a raucous manner that was highly atypical for the team. "They high-fived themselves silly", recalled Peter King. "They were screaming and hooting and raising hell—happier than they had been all year."

Week 11: New York Giants at Minnesota Vikings

Quarter	1	2	3	4	Total
Giants (9–2)	3	6	3	10	22
Vikings (6–5)	3	3	7	7	20

at Hubert H. Humphrey Metrodome

- Date: November 16, 1986
- Game time: 1:00 p.m. EST
- Game weather: indoors (dome)
- Game attendance: 62,003
- Referee: Pat Haggerty
- TV announcers (CBS): Tim Ryan (play-by-play), Terry Bradshaw (color commentator)
- Box Score

Scoring summary

Quarter	Time	Drive			Team	Scoring information	Score	
Quarter	Time	Plays	Yards	TOP	Team	Scoring information	Giants	Vikings
1	7:48				Giants	41-yard field goal by Allegre	3	0
1	1:19				Vikings	39-yard field goal by Nelson	3	3
2	12:46				Giants	37-yard field goal by Allegre	6	3
2	6:53				Vikings	44-yard field goal by Nelson	6	6
2	2:23				Giants	24-yard field goal by Allegre	9	6
3	8:34				Vikings	Rice 8-yard touchdown reception from Kramer, Nelson kick good	9	13
3	1:08				Giants	37-yard field goal by Allegre	12	13
4	9:30				Giants	Johnson 25-yard touchdown reception from Simms, Allegre kick good	19	13
4	6:53				Vikings	Carter 33-yard touchdown reception from Wilson, Nelson kick good	19	20
4	0:12				Giants	33-yard field goal by Allegre	22	20
"TOP" = time of possession. For other American football terms, see Glossary of American football.							22	20

=== Week 12: vs. Denver Broncos ===
In week 12, in what would turn out to be a preview of Super Bowl XXI, veteran defensive end George Martin (at 34 the oldest player on the team) intercepted a pass from Denver Broncos quarterback John Elway and returned it 78 yards for a touchdown before being tackled from behind in the end zone by a celebrating Lawrence Taylor. Then in the final two minutes of the game, Simms hit fan–favorite Phil McConkey for a 46-yard pass. This led to another game-winning kick from Allegre as the Giants defeated Denver 19–16 in front of 75,116 fans at Giants Stadium. With the victory the Giants completed their second five-game winning streak of the season, several of them in close contests; the margin of victory in those five games was 7, 3, 3, 2, and 3 points.

Week 12: Denver Broncos at New York Giants

Quarter	1	2	3	4	Total
Broncos (9–3)	3	3	3	7	16
Giants (10–2)	0	10	3	6	19

at Giants Stadium

- Date: November 23, 1986
- Game time: 1:00 p.m. EST
- Game weather: 43 °F (6 °C), relative humidity 70%, wind 10 mph (16 km/h)
- Game attendance: 75,116
- Referee: Tom Dooley
- TV announcers (NBC): Dick Enberg (play-by-play), Merlin Olsen (color commentator)
- Box Score

Scoring summary

Quarter	Time	Drive			Team	Scoring information	Score	
Quarter	Time	Plays	Yards	TOP	Team	Scoring information	Broncos	Giants
1	6:46				Broncos	40-yard field goal by Karlis	3	0
2	14:57				Giants	31-yard field goal by Allegre	3	3
2	2:38				Broncos	32-yard field goal by Karlis	6	3
2	0:43				Giants	Interception returned 75 yards for touchdown by Martin, Allegre kick good	6	10
3	9:46				Giants	45-yard field goal by Allegre	6	13
3	1:53				Broncos	42-yard field goal by Karlis	9	13
4	10:07				Giants	46-yard field goal by Allegre	9	16
4	1:55				Broncos	Winder 4-yard touchdown run, Karlis kick good	16	16
4	0:06				Giants	34-yard field goal by Allegre	16	19
"TOP" = time of possession. For other American football terms, see Glossary of American football.							16	19

=== Week 13: at San Francisco 49ers ===
In a Monday night encounter at San Francisco in week 13, the Giants overcame a 17–0 halftime deficit to Joe Montana's 49ers en route to a 21–17 victory. In the win, Simms threw for nearly 400 yards and wide receiver Stacy Robinson made an acrobatic catch at the goalline to set up the winning touchdown. Another important play also occurred during that Monday Night Football game. Here is a description of the play taken from a Monday Night Football broadcast in 2005: "On Dec. 1 1986, New York Giants tight end Mark Bavaro cements his reputation as one of the toughest men in the NFL. With the Giants trailing, Bavaro catches an innocent pass from Phil Simms over the middle. It takes nearly seven 49ers defenders to finally drag him down, some of which are carried for almost 20 yards, including future Hall of Famer Ronnie Lott. Bavaro's inspiring play jump starts the Giants, who win the game and eventually the Super Bowl."

Week 13: New York Giants at San Francisco 49ers

Quarter	1	2	3	4	Total
Giants (11–2)	0	0	21	0	21
49ers (7–5–1)	3	14	0	0	17

at Candlestick Park

- Date: December 1, 1986
- Game time: 9:00 p.m. EST
- Game weather: 51 °F (11 °C), relative humidity 69%, wind 8 mph (13 km/h)
- Game attendance: 59,777
- Referee: Ben Dreith
- TV announcers (ABC): Al Michaels (play-by-play), Frank Gifford (color commentator)
- Box Score

Scoring summary

Quarter	Time	Drive			Team	Scoring information	Score	
Quarter	Time	Plays	Yards	TOP	Team	Scoring information	Giants	49ers
1	0:25				49ers	30-yard field goal by Wersching	0	3
2	9:26				49ers	Rice 11-yard touchdown reception from Montana, Wersching kick good	0	10
2	0:45				49ers	Rice 1-yard touchdown run, Wersching kick good	0	17
3	12:19				Giants	Morris 17-yard touchdown reception from Simms, Allegre kick good	7	17
3	7:37				Giants	Robinson 34-yard touchdown reception from Simms, Allegre kick good	14	17
3	3:41				Giants	Anderson 1-yard touchdown run, Allegre kick good	21	17
"TOP" = time of possession. For other American football terms, see Glossary of American football.							21	17

=== Week 14: at Washington Redskins ===
The Giants defeated the Redskins 24–14 in week 14 to move into sole possession of first place in the NFC East. The Redskins held Joe Morris, who had rushed for 181 yards in the Giants week eight victory, to 62 yards on 22 carries. However, Lawrence Taylor recorded three sacks and harassed Redskins' quarterback Jay Schroeder all game, as the Giants recorded four sacks and the Redskins only recorded one. Phil Simms threw touchdown passes to Mark Bavaro, Bobby Johnson, and Phil McConkey in the victory. Schroeder threw six interceptions in the game, matching Sammy Baugh's franchise record, and the Redskins had 7 turnovers overall. After the game, Parcells gave the Redskins credit for their performance and told the reporters that he had a feeling that the two would meet again sometime in the playoffs.

Week 14: New York Giants at Washington Redskins

Quarter	1	2	3	4	Total
Giants (12–2)	0	14	10	0	24
Redskins (11–3)	0	7	0	7	14

at RFK Stadium

- Date: December 7, 1986
- Game time: 1:00 p.m. EST
- Game weather: 38 °F (3 °C), relative humidity 69%, wind 8 mph (13 km/h)
- Game attendance: 55,642
- Referee: Red Cashion
- TV announcers (CBS): Pat Summerall (play-by-play), John Madden (color commentator), Irv Cross (sideline reporter)
- Box Score

Scoring summary

Quarter	Time	Drive			Team	Scoring information	Score	
Quarter	Time	Plays	Yards	TOP	Team	Scoring information	Giants	Redskins
2	8:35				Giants	Bavaro 9-yard touchdown reception from Simms, Allegre kick good	7	0
2	1:55				Redskins	Bryant 4-yard touchdown run, Zendejas kick good	7	7
2	0:23				Giants	Johnson 7-yard touchdown reception from Simms, Allegre kick good	14	7
3	4:33				Giants	21-yard field goal by Allegre	17	7
3	3:11				Giants	McConkey 16-yard touchdown reception from Simms, Allegre kick good	24	7
4Raúl	3:24				Redskins	Bryant 22-yard touchdown reception from Schroeder, Zendejas kick good	24	14
"TOP" = time of possession. For other American football terms, see Glossary of American football.							24	14

=== Week 15: vs. St. Louis Cardinals ===
The Giants defeated the St. Louis Cardinals 27–7 in their fifteenth game of the season in front of 75,261 fans at Giants Stadium. Joe Morris ran for 179 yards and three touchdowns, but had three fumbles. Phil Simms struggled, but the offense was effective nonetheless; of the Giants 313 total yards, 252 came on the ground, while only 62 came from the passing game. The Giants defense controlled the Cardinals throughout the game, particularly in the first half; the Cardinals' first four possessions ended in third-down sacks and fourth-down punts. The Giants committed only two penalties for a total of ten yards, and their defense set a franchise record with nine sacks, despite sending Lawrence Taylor into pass coverage for most of the game. With the victory the Giants clinched their first NFC East division crown.

Week 15: St. Louis Cardinals at New York Giants

Quarter	1	2	3	4	Total
Cardinals (3–11–1)	0	0	0	7	7
Giants (13–2)	7	10	3	7	27

at Giants Stadium

- Date: December 14, 1986
- Game time: 1:00 p.m. EST
- Game weather: 26 °F (−3 °C), relative humidity 46%, wind 14 mph (23 km/h), wind chill 14 °F (−10 °C)
- Game attendance: 75,261
- Referee: Bob McElwee
- TV announcers (CBS): Jack Buck (play-by-play), Joe Theismann (color commentator)
- Box Score

Scoring summary

Quarter	Time	Drive			Team	Scoring information	Score	
Quarter	Time	Plays	Yards	TOP	Team	Scoring information	Cardinals	Giants
1	4:39				Giants	Morris 2-yard touchdown run, Allegre kick good	0	7
2	3:29				Giants	Morris 3-yard touchdown run, Allegre kick good	0	14
2	0:11				Giants	26-yard field goal by Allegre	0	17
3	3:30				Giants	23-yard field goal by Allegre	0	20
4	6:37				Cardinals	Green 15-yard touchdown reception from Mitchell, Schubert kick good	7	20
4	1:57				Giants	Morris 1-yard touchdown run, Allegre kick good	7	27
"TOP" = time of possession. For other American football terms, see Glossary of American football.							7	27

=== Week 16: vs. Green Bay Packers ===
The Giants headed into their final regular season game against the Green Bay Packers as 11½-point favorites and needed a victory to secure homefield advantage throughout the playoffs. Sparked by a blocked punt returned for a TD by Tom Flynn, who had recently been picked up from the Packers, the Giants defeated the Packers 55–24 in front of 71,351 fans at Giants Stadium to finish the regular season with a franchise record 14 victories. The win was the Giants' ninth consecutive, matching the team record set in 1962. The Giants also set a franchise record for points in the first quarter of a game with 21. Although the Packers cut the score to 24–17 at halftime, the Giants scored 31-second half points to put the game out of reach.

Week 16: Green Bay Packers at New York Giants

Quarter	1	2	3	4	Total
Packers (4–12)	0	17	7	0	24
Giants (14–2)	21	3	14	17	55

at Giants Stadium

- Date: December 20, 1986
- Game time: 12:30 p.m. EST
- Game weather: 39 °F (4 °C), relative humidity 63%, wind 13 mph (21 km/h)
- Game attendance: 71,351
- Referee: Fred Silva
- TV announcers (CBS): Dick Stockton (play-by-play), Dan Dierdorf (color commentator), John Dockery (sideline reporter)
- Box Score

Scoring summary

Quarter	Time	Drive			Team	Scoring information	Score	
Quarter	Time	Plays	Yards	TOP	Team	Scoring information	Packers	Giants
1	8:25				Giants	Bavaro 24-yard touchdown reception from Simms, Allegre kick good	0	7
1	7:23				Giants	Flynn returned blocked punt 36 yards for a touchdown, Allegre kick good	0	14
1	0:38				Giants	Morris 3-yard touchdown run, Allegre kick good	0	21
2	8:08				Giants	46-yard field goal by Allegre	0	24
2	4:11				Packers	Ivery 13-yard touchdown reception from Wright, Del Greco kick good	7	24
2	2:52				Packers	Interception returned 58 yards for touchdown by Stills, Del Greco kick good	14	24
2	0:42				Packers	46-yard field goal by Del Greco	17	24
3	8:20				Giants	Bavaro 4-yard touchdown reception from Simms, Allegre kick good	17	31
3	6:38				Packers	Davis 15-yard touchdown reception from Wright, Del Greco kick good	24	31
3	1:42				Giants	Mowatt 22-yard touchdown reception from Simms, Allegre kick good	24	38
4	14:48				Giants	Rouson 10-yard touchdown run, Allegre kick good	24	45
4	7:09				Giants	Rouson 21-yard touchdown run, Allegre kick good	24	52
4	2:07				Giants	26-yard field goal by Allegre	24	55
"TOP" = time of possession. For other American football terms, see Glossary of American football.							24	55

=== Standings ===
NFC East
	W	L	T	PCT	DIV	CONF	PF	PA	STK
^{(1)} New York Giants	14	2	0	.875	7–1	11–1	371	236	W9
^{(4)} Washington Redskins	12	4	0	.750	5–3	9–3	368	296	W1
Dallas Cowboys	7	9	0	.438	5–3	6–6	346	337	L5
Philadelphia Eagles	5	10	1	.344	1–6–1	3–8–1	256	312	L1
St. Louis Cardinals	4	11	1	.281	1–6–1	3–10–1	218	351	W1

== Playoffs ==
=== Schedule ===
Playoff Round	Date	Opponent (seed)	Result	Record	Venue	Attendance	Game recap
NFC Wild Card	First-round bye						
NFC Divisional	January 4, 1987	San Francisco 49ers (3)	W 49–3	1–0	Giants Stadium	76,034	N/A
NFC Championship	January 11, 1987	Washington Redskins (4)	W 17– 0	2–0	Giants Stadium	76,633	N/A
Super Bowl XXI	January 25, 1987	Denver Broncos (A2)	W 39–20	3–0	Rose Bowl	101,063	N/A

==== NFC Divisional Playoffs: vs. San Francisco 49ers ====
The Giants defeated the San Francisco 49ers 49–3 in their opening playoff game. Favored by only three points, the Giants caught a break when 49ers WR Jerry Rice fumbled an apparent touchdown catch-and-carry off his knee early in the game, then dominated the Niners the rest of the way. Their defense held the 49ers to 29 yards rushing, 184 yards in total offense, and 2 of 14 on third-down conversions. The Giants did not commit a turnover and totalled 216 rushing yards. Jim Burt knocked 49ers quarterback Joe Montana out of the game in the second quarter, hitting him as he threw a pass which Lawrence Taylor intercepted and returned the pick 34 yards for a touchdown. The Giants defense also held the 49ers to only nine first downs, and 15 of 37 passing for zero touchdowns and three interceptions.

1986 NFC Divisional Playoff: San Francisco 49ers at New York Giants

Quarter	1	2	3	4	Total
49ers (10–6–1)	3	0	0	0	3
Giants (15–2)	7	21	21	0	49

at Giants Stadium

- Date: January 4, 1987
- Game time: 12:30 p.m. EST
- Game weather: 31 °F (−1 °C), relative humidity 67%, wind 15 mph (24 km/h), wind chill 20 °F (−7 °C)
- Game attendance: 76,034
- Referee: Jerry Markbreit
- TV announcers (CBS): Pat Summerall (play-by-play), John Madden (color commentator), Irv Cross
- Box Score

Scoring summary

Quarter	Time	Drive			Team	Scoring information	Score	
Quarter	Time	Plays	Yards	TOP	Team	Scoring information	49ers	Giants
1	7:29				Giants	Bavaro 24-yard touchdown reception from Simms, Allegre kick good	0	7
1	1:20				49ers	26-yard field goal by Wersching	3	7
2	7:39				Giants	Morris 45-yard touchdown run, Allegre kick good	3	14
2	0:50				Giants	Johnson 15-yard touchdown reception from Simms, Allegre kick good	3	21
2	0:28				Giants	Interception returned 34 yards for touchdown by Taylor, Allegre kick good	3	28
3	8:56				Giants	McConkey 28-yard touchdown reception from Simms, Allegre kick good	3	35
3	1:58				Giants	Mowatt 29-yard touchdown reception from Simms, Allegre kick good	3	42
3	0:16				Giants	Morris 2-yard touchdown run, Allegre kick good	3	49
"TOP" = time of possession. For other American football terms, see Glossary of American football.							3	49

==== NFC Championship: vs. Washington Redskins ====
With wind gusts reaching 33 miles per hour (53 km/h), coach Bill Parcells chose to take the wind when his team won the opening coin toss of the Giants' NFC Championship Game against the Washington Redskins. With the wind at their backs the Giants scored 10 first quarter points while the Redskins managed only two first downs. The Redskins were forced to punt three times in the quarter, and the wind limited those punts to 23, 27, and 24 yards. The Redskins launched a drive behind Jay Schroeder's 48-yard completion to wide receiver Art Monk in the second quarter. However, after the Redskins botched the field goal snap on a 51-yard field goal attempt, the Giants drove for a touchdown with the wind in their face to make the score 17–0 at halftime. The Giants defense dominated the second half, and both teams went scoreless to make the final score 17–0. Schroeder completed only 20 of 50 passes for a meager 3.8 yards per attempt. Keys to the victory were tackle Brad Benson's neutralizing of Redskins pass rusher Dexter Manley, who had 18.5 sacks on the season, and the team's defense. After the game, John Madden remarked: "Last year, I thought the Bears had the best defense I had ever seen. But in the last two weeks, I feel these Giants have as good a defense as has ever played in this league."

1986 NFC Championship Game: Washington Redskins at New York Giants

Quarter	1	2	3	4	Total
Redskins (14–5)	0	0	0	0	0
Giants (16–2)	10	7	0	0	17

at Giants Stadium

- Date: January 11, 1987
- Game time: 4:00 p.m. EST
- Game weather: 39 °F (4 °C), relative humidity 80%, wind 22 mph (35 km/h), wind chill 29 °F (−2 °C)
- Game attendance: 76,633
- Referee: Pat Haggerty
- TV announcers (CBS): Pat Summerall (play-by-play), John Madden (color commentator), Irv Cross (sideline reporter)
- Box Score

Scoring summary

Quarter	Time	Drive			Team	Scoring information	Score	
Quarter	Time	Plays	Yards	TOP	Team	Scoring information	Redskins	Giants
1	11:38				Giants	47-yard field goal by Allegre	0	3
1	5:32				Giants	Manuel 11-yard touchdown reception from Simms, Allegre kick good	0	10
2	6:56				Giants	Morris 1-yard touchdown run, Allegre kick good	0	17
"TOP" = time of possession. For other American football terms, see Glossary of American football.							0	17

==== Super Bowl XXI: vs. Denver Broncos ====
The Giants played the Denver Broncos in Super Bowl XXI in front of 101,063 fans at the Rose Bowl. After the Broncos' Rich Karlis kicked a 48-yard field goal on the game's opening drive, the Giants took the lead with a 78-yard touchdown scoring drive, led by quarterback Phil Simms's 6-for-6 passing. The Broncos scored on a 4-yard quarterback draw by John Elway to make the score 10–7 at the end of the first quarter. Although the two teams' quarterbacks combined to complete all 13 passes attempted in the second quarter, the only score came when Giants' defensive end George Martin sacked Elway in the endzone for a safety to make the score 10–9.

A turning point of the game came on the first possession of the second half. The Giants received the second half kickoff, and led a short drive that stalled at their own 47-yard line. On fourth and 1, the Giants lined up in a punt formation before shifting to a traditional set. Second string quarterback Jeff Rutledge then looked over to Parcells for a signal as to whether he should try to draw the defense offside or run a play. After a nod of approval from Parcells, he ran a quarterback sneak for a first down. The Giants scored on the drive, and built a 39–13 lead before a late touchdown by the Broncos made the final score 39–20. Simms threw touchdown passes to Mark Bavaro and Phil McConkey to give him three on the game, and Joe Morris and Ottis Anderson each rushed for one touchdown. The Giants' defense limited the Broncos to only two net yards and 10 offensive plays in the third quarter. The 30-second half points set a Super Bowl-record for points in a half, and Simms was named MVP after completing 22 of 25 (88%) of his passes—a Super Bowl record which still stands.

Super Bowl XXI: Denver Broncos vs. New York Giants

Quarter	1	2	3	4	Total
Broncos (13–6)	10	0	0	10	20
Giants (17–2)	7	2	17	13	39

at Rose Bowl, Pasadena, California

- Date: January 25, 1987
- Game time: 6:13 p.m. EST
- Game weather: 76 °F (24 °C), sunny, relative humidity 68%, wind 5 mph (8.0 km/h)
- Game attendance: 101,063
- Referee: Jerry Markbreit
- TV announcers (CBS): Pat Summerall (play-by-play), John Madden (color commentator), Irv Cross (sideline reporter)
- Box Score

Scoring summary

Quarter	Time	Drive			Team	Scoring information	Score	
Quarter	Time	Plays	Yards	TOP	Team	Scoring information	Broncos	Giants
1	10:51	8	45	4:09	Broncos	48-yard field goal by Karlis	3	0
1	5:27	9	78	5:24	Giants	Mowatt 6-yard touchdown reception from Simms, Allegre kick good	3	7
1	2:06	6	58	3:21	Broncos	Elway 4-yard touchdown run, Karlis kick good	10	7
2	2:46	3	-15	0:45	Giants	Elway tackled in end zone for a safety by Martin	10	9
3	10:08	8	63	4:52	Giants	Bavaro 13-yard touchdown reception from Simms, Allegre kick good	10	16
3	3:54	9	32	5:07	Giants	21-yard field goal by Allegre	10	19
3	0:24	5	68	2:14	Giants	Morris 1-yard touchdown run, Allegre kick good	10	26
4	10:56	6	52	3:50	Giants	McConkey 6-yard touchdown reception from Simms, Allegre kick good	10	33
4	6:01	13	73	4:55	Broncos	28-yard field goal by Karlis	13	33
4	3:18	5	46	1:43	Giants	Anderson 2-yard touchdown run, Allegre kick no good	13	39
4	2:06	5	69	1:12	Broncos	Johnson 47-yard touchdown reception from Elway, Karlis kick good	20	39
"TOP" = time of possession. For other American football terms, see Glossary of American football.							20	39

== Postseason honors ==
Following the season eight Giants—tight end Mark Bavaro, offensive lineman Brad Benson, nose tackle Jim Burt, linebackers Lawrence Taylor and Harry Carson, punter Sean Landeta, running back Morris, and defensive end Leonard Marshall—were selected to the Pro Bowl. Taylor, who recorded a league-leading 20.5 sacks, became one of just two defensive players to win the NFL Most Valuable Player award and the only defensive player to win the award unanimously. Taylor also won his record third Defensive Player of the Year Award and coach Bill Parcells won his first NFL Coach of the Year Award.

== Stats ==
Passing

Passing
Player	G	GS	QBrec	Cmp	Att	Cmp%	Yds	TD	TD%	Int	Int%	Lng	Y/A	AY/A	Y/C	Y/G	Rate

Rushing

Rushing
Player	G	GS	Att	Yds	TD	Lng	Y/A	Y/G	A/G

Receiving

Receiving
Player	G	GS	Rec	Yds	Y/R	TD	Lng	R/G	Y/G

Kicking

Kicking
Player	G	GS	0–19	20–29	30–39	40–49	50+	FGM	FGA	FG%	XPM	XPA	XP%

Punting

Punting
Player	G	GS	Pnt	Yds	Lng	Blck	Y/P

Kick Return

Kick Return
Player	G	GS	Rt	Yds	TD	Lng	Y/RT

Punt Return

Punt Return
Player	G	GS	Ret	Yds	TD	Lng	Y/R

Defense & Fumbles

Defensive Interceptions
Player	G	GS	Int	Yds	TD	Lng	PD

Fumbles
Player	G	GS	FF	Fmb	FR	Yds	TD

Sacks & Tackles
Player	G	GS	Sk	Tkl	Ast	Sfty

Scoring Summary

Scoring Summary
Player	G	GS	RshTD	RecTD	PR TD	KR TD	FblTD	IntTD	OthTD	AllTD	2PM	2PA	XPM	XPA	FGM	FGA	Sfty	Pts

Team

Team Stats
Player	PF	Yds	Ply	Y/P	TO	FL	1stD	Pass Cmp	Pass Att	Pass Yds	Pass TD	Int	NY/A	Pass 1stD	Rush Att	Rush Yds	Rush TD	Y/A	Rush 1stD	Pen	Yds	1stPy

Quarter-by-quarter

Quarter-by-quarter
	1	2	3	4	OT	T
Giants	40	130	106	95	0	371
Opponents	39	84	37	76	0	236

== Gatorade shower ==
It was these 1986 Giants that popularized the football tradition of dousing the head coach with a cooler of Gatorade near the end of a victorious game. This originated in 1984 when Jim Burt, incensed by what he thought was mistreatment he received during practice, exacted revenge on Bill Parcells by dumping a cooler of Gatorade on him. Lawrence Taylor and Harry Carson later picked up on the ploy and would often sneak up on Coach Parcells near the end of games to dump the remaining Gatorade over his head. The dousing was a big hit with fans, and the Gatorade dumping continued throughout the season after each win, with Taylor, Carson, and several other players (Burt had since ceased doing it) concocting increasingly elaborate, sneaky, and playful ruses, so as to at least attempt to keep the inevitable dousing a surprise.

== Historical ranking ==
The 1986 New York Giants are considered one of the greatest NFL teams of all time, being recognized by the NFL Films series America's Game as the 13th greatest Super Bowl Champion, as well as being selected as the eighth greatest NFL team of all time by readers in a "Page 2" article on ESPN.com. In 2010, the team was tied for fifth in ESPN.com's NFL Super League, a project that ranked the 16 greatest NFL Super Bowl winning teams using computer simulations of a season of play between these teams, and were ranked eighth in The Ultimate Super Rankings, a 2007 ESPN ranking of the top 80 Super Bowl era NFL teams.

== Season facts ==
- The Giants beat the Redskins three times in one season twice in the regular season and once in the playoffs. This was the third time that a team won three games in season against the same opponent. (1982 Dolphins-Jets and 1983 Seahawks-Raiders)
- During the season, the Giants honored the memories of two of their former players on their uniforms. A helmet sticker with the number 38 was added to the uniforms after John Tuggle, a former running back the Giants selected as the final pick of the 1983 draft, died of angiosarcoma in August 1986. After former defensive back and two-time Pro Bowler Spider Lockhart died of lymphoma in July 1986, a patch with Lockhart's nickname and number were added to the jerseys and the Giants wore both the sticker and the jersey patch the whole season.

== Awards and honors ==
- Bill Parcells, National Football League Coach of the Year Award
- Phil Simms, Super Bowl Most Valuable Player
- Lawrence Taylor, AP NFL MVP
- Lawrence Taylor, PFWA NFL MVP
- Lawrence Taylor, Bert Bell Award
- Lawrence Taylor, AP NFL Defensive Player of the Year
- Lawrence Taylor, NEA NFL Defensive Player of the Year
- Lawrence Taylor, UPI NFC Defensive Player of the Year
- Lawrence Taylor, NFC Defensive Player of the Year

== See also ==
- History of the New York Giants (1979–93)
- List of New York Giants seasons

== Sources ==
- Neft, David S., Cohen, Richard M., and Korch, Rick. The Complete History of Professional Football from 1892 to the Present. New York: St. Martin's Press. 1994 ISBN 0-312-11435-4
- Pervin, Lawrence A. Football's New York Giants: A History. McFarland 2009 ISBN 0-7864-4268-9
- Pooley, Eric. True Blue, New York, New York Media LLC, January 26, 1987, issue ISSN 0028-7369 (available online)
- Schwartz, John. Tales from the New York Giants Sideline, Sports Publishing LLC, 2004 ISBN 1-58261-758-9
- Sprechman, Jordan and Shannon, Bill. This Day in New York Sports, Illinois: Sports Publishing LLC. 1998 ISBN 1-57167-254-0
