= Big Blue Wrecking Crew =

New York Giants defense in the 1980s

The Big Blue Wrecking Crew was the defense for the New York Giants during the 1980s that won two Super Bowl championships and three NFC East titles, the first in Super Bowl XXI in 1986 and the other in Super Bowl XXV in 1990. A 3-4 defense, it was among the greatest NFL defenses of all time, and featured Lawrence Taylor as its star, considered by many to be the greatest defensive player in NFL history.

== History ==
=== 1970s woes and rebuilding ===
The New York Giants, while historically a successful franchise, suffered a long playoff drought lasting from 1964 after losing the 1963 NFL Championship to the Chicago Bears until 1981 when they clinched their first playoff berth in 17 seasons on the last day of the regular season by defeating the Dallas Cowboys with a game-winning field goal in overtime.

The New York Giants of the 1970s struggled, posting losing records in 9 of the 10 seasons from 1971 to 1980. The Giants fortunes began to shift in 1981 with the drafting of Lawrence Taylor, as well as the shrewd management of general manager George Young, and the leadership of linebacker coach, defensive coordinator and eventual head coach Bill Parcells. The personnel moves of Young and the hard-line attitude and aggressive coaching of Parcells would be the primary factors of the rise of the Giants in the 1980s. Additionally, the drafting of Taylor began the era of perhaps the greatest linebacker corps in NFL history: the Crunch Bunch.

The Crunch Bunch was an impressive group of linebackers, including future Hall of Famers Harry Carson and Lawrence Taylor as well as five-time Pro Bowler Brad Van Pelt and Brian Kelley. As a unit they totaled 24 Pro Bowl selections and though they only played together for three seasons from 1981 through 1983 it set the foundation for Giants defensive dominance through the 1980s. The unit was anchored by Taylor, who NFL Network named the 3rd greatest player of all time and the best defensive player. The defensive coordinator of the Giants during this span was Bill Belichick, who would go on to coach the New England Patriots to six Super Bowl championships.

=== Breaking out in 1986 ===
The Giants drove me crazy. They gave me the most fits. They were the opposite of Buddy Ryan's Bears defense. They played that soft two-deep zone that didn't allow any big plays. You had to earn everything you got against the Giants.

— —Joe Gibbs

This defensive unit during the 1986 season was an example of the 3-4 defense. It featured George Martin and Leonard Marshall at defensive end, and Jim Burt at nose tackle. The linebacker corps for this team featured Lawrence Taylor as the "Jack", Gary Reasons as the "Will", Harry Carson as the "Mike" and Carl Banks as the "Sam". This front 7 gave up only 80.2 rushing yards per game. Additionally, the team accrued 59 sacks, 24 interceptions, and only gave up 14.8 points per game powering the Giants to a 14–2 record.

In the playoffs the Big Blue Wrecking Crew held the San Francisco 49ers, led by Hall of Fame quarterback Joe Montana to 3 points (and scored themselves on an interception return for a touchdown by Lawrence Taylor) to win 49–3 in the divisional round and shut out a powerful Washington Redskins offense that averaged 23 points per game during the regular season in the NFC Championship 17–0. Although the Redskins posted a 12–4 record of their own in 1986 and made it to the NFC championship game the Giants still beat them 3 times in that season accounting for 3 of their 5 losses.

While the Giants got off to a slow start in Super Bowl XXI, trailing the Denver Broncos led by another Hall of Fame quarterback John Elway 10–9 at halftime, they broke out in the second half reaching a 39–10 lead after scoring 24 unanswered points and set an NFL record by scoring 30 points in the second half, before surrendering 10 points in “garbage time” to ultimately win 39–20.

=== Peak and decline ===
The Giants enjoyed a good stretch of defensive dominance in the 1980s led by the Big Blue Wrecking Crew, which finally peaked in the 1990 season. Though the 1986 Giants are among the greatest defenses of all time, the 1990 Giants rivaled them in ferocity and their sheer will to dominate opposing teams. For 10 games straight, the Giants did not allow more than 20 opposing points. The Giants began the season with a 10–0 record, smothering teams into submission by allowing only 11 points per game during that span. The Big Blue Wrecking Crew was in great form, accruing 23 interceptions, and on average only giving up 13.2 points per game and allowing 20 points or more in only 4 games (including the play-offs) leading the Giants to a 13–3 regular season record.

The Giants defense brought more of the same in the playoffs, defeating the Bears easily in the divisional round 31–3 and holding the 49ers, who averaged 22.1 points per game in the regular season to only 13 points in the NFC Championship Game winning 15–13. Considered by many as one of the greatest games in NFL history it was an extremely physical contest, including a hit by Leonard Marshall on Joe Montana that symbolically ended his career as the quarterback of the 49ers (he would never win or reach another Super Bowl in a 49er uniform).

The Giants would ultimately face the Buffalo Bills in Super Bowl XXV, perhaps the most impressive win of the season. In one of the most memorable Super Bowls of all time, the Giants held the Bills, the highest scoring team in the NFL that year, averaging 26.8 points per game and scoring 44 and 51 points in the divisional round and AFC championship respectively, to a mere 19 points, winning 20–19 on a missed field goal as time expired.

This game would be the pinnacle of Bill Belichick's tenure as defensive coordinator; his game plan, a radical scheme designed to maximize punishment of the Bills receivers now resides in the Pro Football Hall of Fame.

Due to the departure of Parcells, and the advancing age and departure of many of its stars, after the 1990 season the Giants defense entered a decline. After two seasons of mediocrity the Giants surged in 1993, once again leading the NFL in scoring defense, but fell hard to the 49ers in the playoffs losing 44–3. While the defense would remain respectable the team never returned to their dominant ways and the days of Giants defensive dominance were gone. Finally, after a somewhat personally disappointing and injury marred year Lawrence Taylor, who tore an Achilles tendon in November 1992 while chasing the Green Bay Packers' Brett Favre, retired following the 1993 season, this along with the retirement of long time quarterback Phil Simms signaled the end of an era for the Giants.

In many ways 1993 represented a changing of the guard for the Giants. With the loss of longtime team staples such as Lawrence Taylor, Carl Banks and Phil Simms and the drafting of future Giants greats such as Jessie Armstead and Michael Strahan the team entered 1994 with a new and distinctive feel. The reign of the Big Blue Wrecking Crew was effectively over.

Armstead and Strahan were two of the bulwarks of the Giant defense which carried the team to Super Bowl XXXV in 2000.

== Season-by-season statistics ==
The table below summarizes the more important defensive stats for the New York Giants defense from 1984 to 1993. Source:

Season-by-season statistics
Season	Points per game	Total yards per game	Rushing yards per game	Passing yards per game	Sacks	Interceptions
1984	18.7	324.6	113.6	210.9	48	19
1985	17.7	270.0	92.6	177.4	68	24
1986	14.8	297.3	80.2	217.1	59	31
1987	20.8	310.5	117.9	192.7	55	20
1988	19	317.9	109.9	207.9	52	15
1989	15.8	291.5	96.2	195.3	39	22
1990	13.2	262.9	91.2	171.7	30	23
1991	18.6	287.5	107.9	179.6	34	12
1992	22.9	315.2	125.8	189.4	25	14
1993	12.8	291.4	96.7	194.8	41	18

== Starting lineups ==
These lists represent the starting lineups for the 1986 team and the 1990 team for their respective Super Bowl appearances.

1986 Squad
LE	George Martin
NT	Jim Burt
RE	Leonard Marshall
LOLB	Carl Banks
LILB	Gary Reasons
RILB	Harry Carson
ROLB	Lawrence Taylor
LCB	Elvis Patterson
RCB	Perry Williams
SS	Kenny Hill
FS	Herb Welch

1990 Squad
LE	Eric Dorsey
NT	Erik Howard
RE	Leonard Marshall
LOLB	Carl Banks
LILB	Gary Reasons
RILB	Pepper Johnson
ROLB	Lawrence Taylor
LCB	Mark Collins
RCB	Everson Walls
SS	Greg Jackson
FS	Myron Guyton

== See also ==
- New York Giants
- List of New York Giants seasons
