= Phil McConkey =

American football player (born 1957)

No. 80, 88, 82, 21
- Position: Wide receiver

Personal information
- Born: February 24, 1957 (age 69); Buffalo, New York, U.S.
- Listed height: 5 ft 10 in (1.78 m)
- Listed weight: 170 lb (77 kg)

Career information
- High school: Canisius (Buffalo)
- College: Navy
- NFL draft: 1979: undrafted

Career history
- New York Giants (1984–1985); Green Bay Packers (1986); New York Giants (1986–1988); Phoenix Cardinals (1989); San Diego Chargers (1989)

Awards and highlights
- Super Bowl champion (XXI)

Career NFL statistics
- Receptions: 67
- Receiving yards: 1,113
- Receiving touchdowns: 2
- Kick return yards: 1,324
- Punt return yards: 1,832
- Stats at Pro Football Reference

Philip Joseph McConkey (born February 24, 1957) is an American former professional football player who was a wide receiver for the New York Giants (1984–1988), Green Bay Packers (1986), Phoenix Cardinals (1989), and San Diego Chargers (1989) of the National Football League (NFL). He played college football for the Navy Midshipmen.

== Early life ==
McConkey grew up in Buffalo, New York, the son of Joe, a Buffalo police officer, and Jean McConkey (1936–2013). His father also worked side jobs and managed to pay for Phil and his sister, Debbie, to attend private schools.

He attended Canisius High School, and during that time Canisius didn't lose a football game during McConkey's last three seasons when they were one of the top teams in the state. He played both defensive back and wide receiver, earning local honors, but in his senior year in 1975 he still weighed only 140 pounds. Phil's play on the field earned him a spot as a Connolly Cup Finalist in 1974.

He knew the only way he could attend college was on a scholarship, but he received no offers until he earned an appointment to the U.S. Naval Academy.

== Navy Midshipmen ==
McConkey played college football for the Navy Midshipmen, catching 56 passes for 1,028 yards, while also gaining 1,039 special teams return yards and scoring 13 touchdowns (10 receiving, two rushing and one punt return).

In his senior season, McConkey helped lead the Midshipmen to a 9–3 record. In his last game for Navy in 1978, McConkey led Navy to a come-from-behind 23–16 win over Brigham Young University and star quarterback Jim McMahon in the inaugural Holiday Bowl and was named MVP.

== Pro football career ==
McConkey had completed his mandatory five years in the U.S. Navy as an officer and helicopter pilot when he decided to try to play professional football at age 27. He weighed barely 160 pounds and hadn't played football in five years. The first person he approached was Steve Belichick, Navy's backfield coach and scout, who timed him at a speedy 4.4 seconds in the 40-yard dash. Belichick then contacted his son, Bill Belichick, who had just been elevated to defensive coordinator of the New York Giants under head coach Bill Parcells.

McConkey was signed by the Giants as a 27-year-old rookie. He was the first Navy Midshipman to join the NFL after four full years of service since Roger Staubach in 1969.

In his six NFL seasons, McConkey was used as a reserve receiver, and frequently returned punts and kickoffs on special teams. His best statistical season was 1985, when he caught 25 passes for 404 yards, returned 53 punts for 442 yards, and gained 234 yards returning kickoffs.

After two seasons with the Giants, in 1986 he was released and signed with the Green Bay Packers. He played four games with the Packers in 1986, then was re-signed by the Giants for the season's last 12 games. In those 12 games, he caught 16 passes for 279 yards and one touchdown, plus he was a punt returner and kick returner.

McConkey is best remembered for his performance in Super Bowl XXI after the Giants' 1986 season, which the Giants won 39–20 over the Denver Broncos. In the game, his 25-yard punt return set up a Giants field goal. On the team's next drive, his 44-yard reception on a flea flicker play gave the Giants a first down on Denver's one-yard line, setting up a touchdown on the next play. In the fourth quarter, McConkey caught a six-yard touchdown reception after the pass bounced off the fingertips of tight end Mark Bavaro. Overall, McConkey contributed 50 receiving yards, 25 punt return yards, and one touchdown in the Giants victory. He also caught a 28-yard touchdown pass in New York's divisional playoff win over the San Francisco 49ers a few weeks earlier.

While running off the field during the celebration following the victory in Super Bowl XXI, McConkey spotted a handgun on the field. He picked up the weapon, which was subsequently taken by a security officer, who in turn returned it to the police officer who was unaware it was missing. The officer had lost the weapon while struggling with a fan who had jumped onto the field.

He played for the Giants for two more seasons as the team's primary punt returner and reserve wide receiver. His final NFL season was 1989 for both the San Diego Chargers and Arizona Cardinals. McConkey finished his six NFL seasons with a Super Bowl ring, 67 receptions for 1,113 yards and two touchdowns, 228 punt returns for 1,832 yards, and 69 kickoff returns for 1,324 yards in 84 games.

== Political life ==
In 1990, McConkey ran for the United States House of Representatives for the 12th Congressional District of New Jersey, encompassing parts of Hunterdon, Mercer, Somerset, Morris and Warren counties.

The seat was a heavily Republican district and was being vacated by incumbent Republican Rep. Jim Courter. In the Republican primary, McConkey was defeated by Dick Zimmer, who won the recently vacated seat in the November General election. Zimmer received 37.7% of the vote to McConkey's 30.8%. Future congressman Rodney Frelinghuysen, the scion of a powerful political family, would finish third. There are no run-off elections in New Jersey.

== Electoral history ==
1990 New Jersey Congressional District 12 Republican Primary
Party	Candidate	Votes	%
Republican	Dick Zimmer	15,834	37.7
Republican	Phil McConkey	12,925	30.8
Republican	Rodney Frelinghuysen	12,257	29.2
Republican	Joseph Shanahan	989	2.4

== Personal life ==
McConkey is president of Academy Securities, a San Diego–based financial services firm, and he owns several other San Diego businesses. He also still participates in athletics, including Masters Track events.

He is married to Erin McConkey and has a daughter, May. In 2013, he was inducted into the Greater Buffalo Sports Hall of Fame.

== See also ==
- History of the New York Giants (1979–1993)
