= History of the New York Giants (1979–1993) =

The period of 1979 to 1993 was one of the most successful in New York Giants franchise history. Members of the NFL's National Football Conference, the Giants struggled after reaching the NFL Championship Game in 1963. The 1964 season began a 15-year stretch in which the Giants were unable to make the playoffs. However, in 1979 they started rebuilding, hiring General Manager George Young, the first GM in the family-run team's history. Young, a former Baltimore Colts and Miami Dolphins executive, assembled a team that would become successful in the 1980s and early 1990s. Led by a run-oriented offense and a defense nicknamed the "Big Blue Wrecking Crew", the team qualified for the postseason six times in 10 seasons from 1981 to 1990. During that period, they won Super Bowl XXI (1987) and Super Bowl XXV (1991).

The period encompasses the careers of quarterback Phil Simms and linebacker Lawrence Taylor, two of the most accomplished players in team history. Simms was drafted to little fanfare from tiny Morehead State University in 1979, and struggled in his initial seasons before becoming a Pro Bowl quarterback. Taylor was the second selection in the 1981 NFL draft and, in contrast to Simms, was an immediate success, winning the league's Defensive Player of the Year Award in both his rookie and sophomore season. The team's success in this period was aided by head coach Bill Parcells, running back Joe Morris, and Hall of Fame linebacker Harry Carson. Following the 1990 season and a victory in Super Bowl XXV, Parcells resigned as coach and was replaced by the team's offensive coordinator, Ray Handley.

Handley served as coach for two mediocre seasons (1991–92), in which the Giants went from Super Bowl champions to a 6–10 record. He was fired following the 1992 season and replaced by former Denver Broncos coach Dan Reeves. In the early 1990s, Simms and Taylor played out the last years of their career with steadily declining production. In 1993, however, the Giants experienced a resurgent season with Reeves at the helm, and Simms and Taylor ended their careers as members of a winning team.

== Building a champion: 1979–1985 ==
The Giants made the decision to hire a general manager for the first time in team history following the 1978 season. However, disagreements during the search caused severe friction and discord between owners Wellington and Tim Mara. At one point they had tried to hire Jan Van Duser, a league executive, but he declined the offer due to the ownership squabbles. Finally, the Maras asked NFL Commissioner Pete Rozelle to step in with a recommendation. Rozelle recommended George Young, who worked in personnel for the Miami Dolphins and had been an assistant coach for the Baltimore Colts. Rozelle had discussed the hiring before hand with former Giants Frank Gifford and Tom Scott, who recommended hiring Young. They had already recommended Young to Wellington and his son John, but felt if Rozelle presented the recommendation as his own idea the brothers would be more likely to accept the pick. Young was hired and he was instrumental in turning around the fortunes of the franchise. "Oh, there is no question he helped save the franchise", John Mara later said. "It looked like a no-win situation. He came in and overhauled everything we did in a more professional way." Despite the hiring and subsequent success, the rift between Wellington and Tim lasted for several years and, at one point a partition had to be put between the two in the owner's box.

=== Simms and Taylor arrive: 1979–1982 ===
One of Young's first actions was to hire Ray Perkins as head coach. Perkins was an offensive assistant coach on the Dallas Cowboys under Hall of Fame coach Tom Landry. In his first draft, Young drafted quarterback Phil Simms from Morehead State University with the seventh overall draft pick to the surprise of many. Simms had never played on a winning team at Morehead State, and acknowledged after he was drafted that "[m]ost people have never heard of me." Young was certain of the choice though saying, "[o]nce in a while you get a chance to get a guy with a great arm and great potential and you'd darn sight better take it." Simms was unhappy with the selection, and had other teams which he favored playing on over the Giants. The Giants lost their first five games of the season with Joe Pisarcik starting at quarterback. Simms came on in relief of Pisarcik in the fifth game and started the next four, all of which the Giants won. They lost five out of their last seven however, finishing 6–10 for the year. They fell to 4–12 in 1980. Simms play was inconsistent, as he combined for 28 touchdowns against 33 interceptions while completing 48.8% of his passes over his first two seasons.

With the second overall draft pick in the 1981 draft, the Giants selected Lawrence Taylor, linebacker out of the University of North Carolina. Taylor impressed right from the start; in training camp his teammates took to calling him Superman and jokingly suggested that his locker should be replaced with a phone booth. The impact that Taylor had on the Giants' defense was immediate, and predicated the defense's transformation from allowing 425 points in 1980 to 257 in 1981. He was named 1981's NFL Defensive Rookie of the Year and NFL Defensive Player of the Year by the Associated Press, becoming to date the only rookie to ever win the Defensive Player of the Year award. His arrival raised the Giants linebacker corps—which already included Brad Van Pelt and future Hall of Famer Harry Carson—into one of the league's best: the Crunch Bunch.

The Giants started the 1981 season 5–3; but lost their next three games to fall to 5–6. Further complicating matters, Simms went down with a separated shoulder in the November 15th loss to the Washington Redskins. He was replaced by Scott Brunner. However, with Brunner leading the team, the Giants beat the defending conference champion Philadelphia Eagles 20–10 before losing to the San Francisco 49ers 17–10. They defeated the Los Angeles Rams 10–7 and the St. Louis Cardinals 20–10 setting up a season finale against the Dallas Cowboys, in which a win, along with a New York Jets victory over the Green Bay Packers the next day, would clinch a playoff spot for the Giants. Wearing their white jerseys at home (so as to force the Cowboys to wear their "unlucky" blue jerseys) the Giants won the game 13–10 in overtime on a Joe Danelo field goal. The Jets defeated the Packers, clinching the Giants' their first playoff berth since 1963. The Giants defeated the Eagles on the road 27–21 in the Wild Card round for their first playoff win since 1958 and first ever road post season win, but then lost to the eventual Super Bowl champion 49ers 38–24.

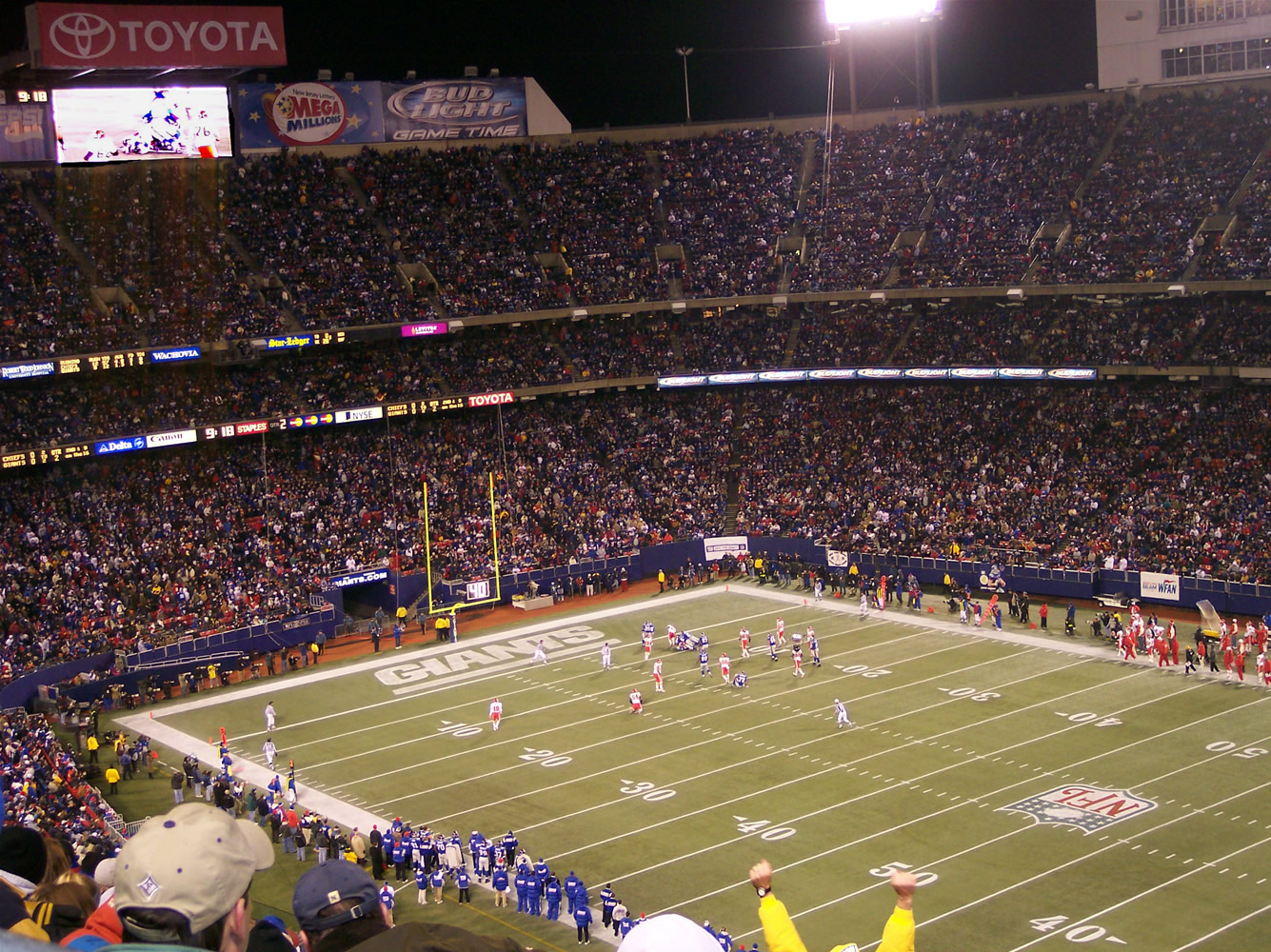
Giants Stadium was home to the Giants from 1976 to 2009.

The Giants were unable to build on their success in 1982, due in part to the 1982 NFL Players Strike which reduced the schedule to 9 games, and also to Ray Perkins' mid-season announcement that he was leaving the team at season's end to coach at the University of Alabama. The Giants lost their first two games before the strike and their first game upon returning. In New York's second game (against Green Bay on Monday Night Football) Carson recorded 25 tackles; 20 solo and 5 assists. They then won their next three games against the Detroit Lions, the Houston Oilers, and Philadelphia to even their record at 3–3. Perkins then announced that he was leaving to coach the University of Alabama in place of the retiring Bear Bryant after the season. The team's defensive coordinator, Bill Parcells, was chosen to replace him after a series of informal discussions with Young, during which Parcells did not know he was being interviewed for the position. Parcells named Bill Belichick the team's defensive coordinator and linebackers coach before the season. Belichick would later coach the New England Patriots to six Super Bowl titles. Simms, who had been unable to stabilize the quarterback situation up to that point, missed the entire season with a knee injury suffered in a preseason game against the New York Jets. Young described Perkins announcement as "a setback", and said "it slowed us down, interrupted our continuity." Lawrence Taylor however, remained a bright spot, again winning the NFL Defensive Player of the Year award.

=== Early Parcells era: 1983–1985 ===
Parcells first year proved difficult. In his first major decision as head coach, he decided to bench Simms in favor of Brunner based on what he had done in the 1981 season after Simms was injured. At first it appeared that Parcells' decision was justified, especially after a 27–3 victory over the Green Bay Packers gave the Giants a 2–2 record after 4 games. However, the Giants collapsed from there. The team went winless in their next seven games, losing six and garnering a tie with the St. Louis Cardinals, before defeating the Philadelphia Eagles to end the streak. The Giants then lost their remaining games to finish with a 3-12-1 record, including a 1-6-1 division record and a 1-7 home record (their only win was the game against the Packers; they defeated the Eagles at Veterans Stadium and their first win came at Atlanta–Fulton County Stadium against the Falcons). Brunner had a subpar season, completing just 49.2% of his passes and throwing 9 touchdowns against 22 interceptions.

Parcells ignored fans' protests and stuck with Brunner, although third stringer Jeff Rutledge saw considerable action. Finally, in a week six game against the Eagles, he brought Simms back to thunderous fan applause, only to see him suffer a season-ending hand injury. This was Simms fourth serious injury in as many seasons. The Giants' poor play caused 51,589 no–shows for the December 4 game in Giants Stadium. One of the few bright spots was rookie placekicker Ali Haji-Sheikh, who set an NFL record with 35 field goals in 42 attempts. The season was a disastrous one for Parcells, who dealt with both personal and professional heartbreak. Both of his parents died during the year and toward the end of the season, rumors began to circulate that the first year Giants coach would be fired and former University of Miami coach Howard Schnellenberger, who went on to win the school's first of an eventual four national championships in eight years, would take over. Parcells did have some supporters, one of whom was Jimmy "The Greek" Snyder; on the December 11, 1983 edition of The NFL Today Snyder spoke of the troubles Parcells inherited from his predecessor Perkins. The Giants elected to stick with Parcells after Schnellenberger elected to take a job in the United States Football League.

After the season, the Giants were involved in a fight for his services of Taylor with the New Jersey Generals of the United States Football League. Generals owner Donald Trump had given Taylor a $1 million interest-free, 25-year loan on December 14, 1983, with the provision that he would begin playing in the USFL in 1988. Taylor immediately regretted the decision. The Giants, who were eager to keep Taylor, took part in negotiating his way out of it. To free Taylor from the contract, the Giants had to pay Trump $750,000 over the next five seasons for Trump to release Taylor's rights, and give Taylor a new six-year, 6.2-million-dollar contract.

Parcells instituted numerous changes before the 1984 season. He changed half of the roster, getting rid of players he deemed problematic, overhauled the team's strength training program, and trained the players harder to make them more resistant to injury. The Giants had a problem with players abusing drugs in the early 1980s, and Parcells decided he had to take a stand. He estimates that he released 20–30 players due to drug use in his first three years as head coach, some after giving them second chances. He would often call their mothers to tell them of the players habits in an attempt to get them off drugs, and several times he recounts crying along with players as he released them. Simms won the starting job back for the season, and Brunner was released. Parcells announced the decision by saying, "[h]e gives us our best chance to win right now." Simms responded by throwing for 4,044 yards, making him the first Giant to reach 4,000 yards passing in a season. The Giants had a resurgent season, highlighted by a midseason stretch where they won five of six against opponents such as the defending conference champion Redskins, the Dallas Cowboys and their new co–tenants at Giants Stadium, the Jets. With two games left the Giants had a 9–5 record and a chance to win their first divisional title in 21 years. Yet despite the fact that they lost those final two games to finish 9–7, the Giants still made the playoffs as a Wild Card. In the first round, they defeated the Los Angeles Rams 16-13 in Anaheim before losing, 21–10, to the eventual Super Bowl champion San Francisco 49ers. Standout performers included Rob Carpenter and Joe Morris, who split running back duties, combining for over 1,300 yards and 11 touchdowns. Four receivers had over 30 catches on the year, including tight end Zeke Mowatt and receiver Bobby Johnson who tied for the team lead with 48 catches each. Phil McConkey returned punts and kickoffs. Parcells installed five new starters on defense, including Leonard Marshall at defensive end and Jim Burt at nose tackle, and the team's first round pick was used to draft Michigan State linebacker Carl Banks, who would become a key member of the Giants' linebacking corps for the next several seasons.

The Giants started out the 1985 season 3–1. They then lost to the Cowboys 30–29 in one of the first Sunday night national TV games, and to the Cincinnati Bengals 35–30, despite 513 yards passing from Simms, to drop to .500. They rallied to win their next 4 in a row, and alternated wins and losses the rest of the season to finish 10–6, and in a three–way tie for 1st. Though the Giants lost the division to the Cowboys on a tiebreaker, they still made the playoffs as a Wild Card. For the third straight time the Giants won their first round Wild Card playoff game, this time playing at home (the first Giants home playoff game since 1962), 17–3 over the defending champion 49ers. In the divisional playoffs they were defeated by the eventual Super Bowl champion Chicago Bears 21–0. After the loss Parcells promised Carson and defensive end George Martin, two of the team's longest tenured players, that next year's team would win a Super Bowl for them.

Many of the players that would play key roles on the Giants Super Bowl teams emerged in 1985. Joe Morris, known as "Little Joe" for his diminutive stature (Morris stood 5 ft 7 in and weighed 195 pounds), emerged as the main running threat on the Giants, rushing for 1,336 yards, scoring 21 touchdowns and making the Pro Bowl. Second year receiver Lionel Manuel led the Giants with 49 catches, and tight end Mark Bavaro had 37 catches in his first season. Simms again threw every pass for the Giants that season, passing for over 3,800 yards, and 22 touchdowns. Taylor, Marshall, and Martin combined for 38.5 sacks.

== Success: 1986–1990 ==
=== 1986: Super Bowl champions ===
The Giants entered the 1986 season as one of the favorites to win the Super Bowl. They had their first test in the opening week Monday Night Football game against the defending NFC East champion Dallas Cowboys. They lost 31–28 at Texas Stadium, when Herschel Walker scored on a 10 yard run with 76 seconds left. The Giants, however, won their next five in a row and 14 of their last 15, to finish the season 14–2.

The turning point of the season came in a game against the Minnesota Vikings in November. Trailing Minnesota 20–19 late in the fourth quarter in the Metrodome, Phil Simms completed a desperate fourth and 17 pass to Bobby Johnson for a first down. The completion led to Raúl Allegre's fifth field goal and an important Giants victory. The following week, veteran defensive end George Martin intercepted a pass from Denver Broncos quarterback John Elway and returned it 78 yards for a touchdown. Then in the final two minutes of the game, Simms hit fan–favorite Phil McConkey for a 46-yard pass. This led to another game-winning kick from Allegre as the Giants defeated Denver 19-16. In a Monday night encounter at San Francisco the next week, the Giants overcame a 17–0 halftime deficit to Joe Montana's 49ers en route to a 21–17 victory.

In the win, Simms threw for nearly 400 yards and wide receiver Stacy Robinson made an acrobatic catch at the goalline to set up the winning touchdown. Another important play also occurred during that Monday Night Football game. Here is a description of the play taken from a Monday Night Football broadcast in 2005: "On Dec. 1 1986, New York Giants tight end Mark Bavaro cements his reputation as one of the toughest men in the NFL. With the Giants trailing, Bavaro catches an innocent pass from Phil Simms over the middle. It takes nearly seven 49ers defenders to finally drag him down, some of which are carried for almost 20 yards, including future Hall of Famer Ronnie Lott. Bavaro's inspiring play jump starts the Giants, who win the game and eventually the Super Bowl." The defense set the tone for these Giants, allowing only 236 points, second fewest in the NFL. Lawrence Taylor was the standard bearer, and set a single–season team record with 20.5 sacks. In addition to winning an unprecedented third Defensive Player of the Year Award, Taylor was named NFL MVP by the Associated Press, becoming only the second defensive player to win the award.

On offense, Joe Morris had another standout season in 1986, rushing for 1,516 yards, scoring 14 touchdowns and making his 2nd straight Pro Bowl. Also making the Pro Bowl were Bavaro, who caught 66 passes for 1,001 yards, Carson, Jim Burt, Leonard Marshall, and Brad Benson, giving the Giants seven representatives. For Taylor and Carson the Pro Bowl berths marked their sixth straight selections.

Having won their first divisional title in 23 years, the Giants hosted the 49ers in the Divisional Playoffs and won easily, 49-3. The Giants then shut out the Redskins 17–0 in the NFC Championship Game at Giants Stadium. At the end of the game, mindful of how loyal and supportive their fans had been through some very lean years, the Giants flashed a message on the stadium message board thanking "the best fans in the world".

The Giants went on to play the Denver Broncos in Super Bowl XXI in front of 101,063 fans at the Rose Bowl. After falling behind 10–9 at halftime, the Giants defeated the Broncos 39–20. A turning point of the game came on the first possession of the second half. The Giants received the second half kickoff, and led a short drive that stalled at their own 47-yard line. On fourth and one, the Giants lined up in a punt formation before shifting to a traditional set. Second string quarterback Jeff Rutledge then ran a quarterback sneak for a first down. The Giants scored on the drive, and built a 39–13 lead before a late touchdown by the Broncos made the final score 39–20. Quarterback Phil Simms was named MVP after completing 22 of 25 (88%) of his passes—a Super Bowl record.

It was these 1986 Giants that popularized the football tradition of dousing the head coach with a cooler of Gatorade near the end of a victorious game. This originally started in 1985 when Jim Burt, incensed by what he thought was mistreatment he received in practice the week leading up to a game, exacted revenge on Bill Parcells by dumping a cooler of Gatorade on him after the Giants won that week's game. Lawrence Taylor and Harry Carson later picked up on the ploy and would often sneak up on Coach Parcells near the end of games to dump the remaining Gatorade over his head. The dousing was a big hit with fans, and the Gatorade dumping would continue on throughout the season after each win, with Taylor, Carson, and several other players (Burt had since ceased doing it) concocting increasingly elaborate, sneaky and playful ruses, so as to at least attempt to keep the inevitable dousing a surprise.

=== 1987–1989 ===
The 1987 season was a disappointment for the Giants. They lost their first two games of the season before the 1987 NFL Players Strike. As opposed to the players strike five years previous, NFL owners made a decision to go forward with replacement players. Unlike other teams such as the Washington Redskins and Houston Oilers, who made specific and elaborate plans to deal with the replacement games, the Giants made no plans. This resulted in the Giants losing all three replacement games, putting their record at 0–5 before the strike was over and the regular players returned. Though the Giants went a respectable 6–4 over their final 10 games, they were out of the playoffs at 6–9. A particular disappointment was the running game, which due to injuries to the offensive line (including tackle Karl Nelson missing the entire season due to Hodgkin's disease) struggled all season. Standouts included tight end Mark Bavaro, who led the team in catches with 55, and three of the Giants linebackers making the Pro Bowl—Taylor, Carl Banks (who was voted the team's MVP by the players), and Carson.

The Giants 1988 season got off to a rough start due to an offseason scandal involving Lawrence Taylor. Taylor had abused cocaine which violated the NFL's substance abuse policy and was suspended for the first four games of the season. Taylor's over the edge lifestyle was becoming an increasing concern for fans and team officials. This was especially true given the eventual career paths of talented players like Hollywood Henderson and Dexter Manley whose drug problems derailed their careers. However, after his return Taylor played at his normal All-Pro level, recording 15.5 sacks in 12 games. The intense worry and scrutiny would prove to be for naught, as for the rest of his career Taylor passed his drug tests and avoided suspension.

The Giants struggled to start the season. Taylor's absence, combined with a difficult early season schedule had them alternating wins and losses through their first six games. However, with Taylor back and playing well they were able to take full advantage of their remaining easier games (due to their last–place schedule from the year before), winning their next four games against the Cowboys, the Atlanta Falcons, and the Detroit Lions twice. After two straight losses, including a loss to the Philadelphia Eagles, they won their next three contests to set up a win-or-go-home game against the New York Jets in the season finale. The Jets game was technically a "road" game, and though the Jets were playing for little other than pride and a winning season, they defeated the Giants 27–21. In the game quarterback Ken O'Brien found Al Toon in the corner of the endzone in the final minute to give the Jets a victory. When the 49ers got blown out by the Rams 38–16 in the night game, the Giants were left outside of the postseason despite going 10–6. Season highlights included Joe Morris, in what would be his last year with the Giants, rushing for 1,083 yards, and the emergence of wide receiver Lionel Manuel, who led the team with 65 catches and 1,029 yards receiving.

After missing the playoffs in 1988, the Giants started the 1989 season 8–1 and did not allow more than 24 points in any game. After suffering through a 1–3 stretch, including a 31–10 loss to the Los Angeles Rams in Anaheim, the Giants rallied to win their final three games to secure the second best record in the NFC at 12–4. The division clinching season finale was highlighted by kick returner Dave Meggett's first career punt return for a touchdown. Though many people predicted an NFC Championship showdown between the Giants and the 49ers, the Giants lost their divisional playoff game to the Rams 19–13 in overtime. The highlight of the game was wide receiver Flipper Anderson's catch of the game-winning touchdown pass over cornerback Mark Collins. After he caught the pass, Anderson raced down the sideline, through the end zone, and into the tunnel that led to the locker rooms, silencing the crowd.

During the 1989 season, 11–year veteran Ottis Anderson, a Plan B Free Agent, emerged as the Giants new featured running back. His style of power running was an ideal fit for Parcells' offensive strategy and he ran for 1,023 yards and caught 28 passes. Dave Meggett also emerged as a threat on third downs and special teams, catching 34 passes for 531 yards and making the Pro Bowl.

=== 1990: Champions again ===
Although the Giants had one of the most successful seasons in franchise history in 1990, the season had a difficult beginning as Taylor held out of training camp, demanding a new contract with a salary of $2 million per year. Talks reached September with no progress. As the season approached Taylor received $2,500 a day in fines for not reporting. Taylor signed a contract just four days before the season opener against the Philadelphia Eagles. Despite barely practicing since the previous season, he started and finished with three sacks and a forced fumble.

They won their first 10 games, setting a franchise record for best start to a season. In those 10 wins the Giants did not allow more than 20 points in any game, and allowed 7 points or less 5 times. The San Francisco 49ers also got off to a strong start, matching the Giants with their own 10–0 start. As their Week 13 Monday Night Football matchup approached, it became increasingly possible that it would become the first matchup of 11–0 teams in NFL history. However, the Giants lost their next game, 31–13 to the Philadelphia Eagles, and the 49ers also lost their next game. The game drew high ratings nonetheless. The Giants held the 49ers west coast offense to seven points. But scored only three, in suffering their second straight loss.

The Giants rallied and won the following week against the Minnesota Vikings before facing the Buffalo Bills in their regular season home finale. Despite holding the Bills' powerful offense to 17 points, the Giants lost 17–13, for their third loss in four games. To compound the team's problems, Phil Simms suffered a broken foot that put him on the sidelines for the rest of the season. His replacement, Jeff Hostetler, had been with the team since 1984, but had thrown just 68 passes coming into the season.

To secure a first round bye, the Giants needed to beat two of the NFL's worst teams, the Phoenix Cardinals and New England Patriots on the road. The Giants won the Cardinals game 24–21. Their game against the Patriots was a de facto home game, as many Giants fans made the trip up to Foxborough to sell the stadium out. The Patriots, who came in 1-14 and on a 13-game losing streak in a scandal-plagued season, played the Giants better than expected, but missed a field goal that proved the difference as the Giants held on for a 13-10 win. The win secured a 13-3 record, and the playoff bye as the NFC's second seed. The team discipline Parcells installed was exemplified by the Giants setting the record for fewest turnovers in a season with 14 (this was the NFL record until 2008, when the Giants would again set the record along with the Miami Dolphins).

The Giants defeated the Chicago Bears 31–3 in the divisional playoff round, setting up a rematch with the 49ers in San Francisco for the NFC Championship and a Super Bowl berth. As they had in Week 12, the Giants defense held San Francisco's offense in check, limiting San Francisco to one touchdown and two field goals. The 49ers defense also held the Giants' offense in check, limiting the Giants to four Matt Bahr field goals through the midway point of the fourth of quarter. In the game's waning moments Erik Howard caused a Roger Craig fumble, and Lawrence Taylor recovered it. The Giants drove down the field and got into field goal range for Bahr. On the game's last play, Bahr hit a 42–yard field goal to give the Giants the NFC title, 15–13, over the two-time defending Super Bowl champions. Bahr set an NFC Championship Game record with his fifth field goal of the day.

The win set up another rematch for the Giants, this time in the Super Bowl against the Buffalo Bills. Throughout the 1990 season, the Bills' emergence as a championship caliber team had been one of the largest storylines. The Bills had a cutting edge, no-huddle offense, led by head coach Marv Levy, quarterback Jim Kelly, running back Thurman Thomas, wide receiver Andre Reed and an offensive line led by Kent Hull. They had also recorded a 13–3 record during the 1990 season, culminating with a 51–3 victory over the Los Angeles Raiders in the AFC Championship game. Heading into the game the Bills were installed as seven point favorites.

==== Super Bowl XXV ====
Super Bowl XXV took place amidst a background of war and patriotism in front of 73,813 fans at Tampa Stadium, in Tampa, Florida. The Persian Gulf War had begun less than two weeks previous and the nation rallied around the Super Bowl as a symbol of America. Adding to the patriotism was Whitney Houston's stirring rendition of the National Anthem, which became known as one of the greatest renditions in Super Bowl history. The game lived up to the stirring Anthem, as it went down as the most competitive Super Bowl in history. The Giants got off to a quick 3–0 lead. However, the Bills scored the next 12 points, on a field goal, a touchdown by backup running back Don Smith, and a safety after Jeff Hostetler was sacked in the end zone by Bruce Smith, to give the Bills a 12–3 lead. The Giants then ran a drive that took almost 8 minutes, and culminated in a 14-yard touchdown pass from Hostetler to Stephen Baker making the score 12–10 at halftime.

The Giants received the second half kickoff and mounted a record-setting drive. The opening drive ran for over 9 minutes (a Super Bowl record) and culminated in a 1-yard touchdown run by Ottis Anderson, giving the Giants a 17–12 lead. The signature play of the drive came on a third down play, when Giants receiver Mark Ingram appeared about to be tackled well short of a first down. However, Ingram evaded several tacklers, and dragged one defender just enough to get the Giants the first down, and kept the drive alive. By this time, the Giants strategy to handle the Bills offense had become clear: keep them off the field. Indeed, the Giants two touchdown drives consumed over 17 minutes.

On the first play of the fourth quarter, Thurman Thomas ran for a 31-yard touchdown that put the Bills back in front, 19–17. A few possessions later, the Giants drove down to the Bills 4 yard line, but were unable to score and had to settle for a 21-yard field goal by Matt Bahr that gave the Giants a 20–19 lead. Both teams exchanged possessions before the Bills began one final drive. The Bills drove down to the Giants 30-yard line to set up what would be a potentially game-winning 47-yard field goal attempt by Scott Norwood. Just before the kick, ABC showed a graphic indicating that, on grass that season, Norwood had made just 3–of–7 field goals from at least 40 yards. A few moments later, in what became the game's signature moment, Norwood's attempt missed wide right, and the Giants won their second Super Bowl, 20–19.

The Giants set a Super Bowl record for time of possession with a mark of 40:33, and Ottis Anderson was named MVP of the game after rushing for 102 yards and a touchdown.

=== End of an era ===
"This is the 90's. I was in the 80's. It's going away from me. I've given everything I could for 10 years."
— Bill Parcells, retirement press conference, May 16, 1991.

The 1990 season and Super Bowl win marked the end of an era for the Giants. Parcells had grown restless as coach of the Giants and yearned for complete control of the team. Knowing that he would not get that opportunity with George Young as general manager, Parcells decided in the spring of 1991 to leave the Giants for a career in broadcasting.

There was also an ownership change in what had been one of the most stable front offices in professional sports. In February 1991, after being diagnosed with cancer, Tim Mara sold his 50% interest in the team to Bob Tisch for a reported $80 million. The sale was worked out before the Super Bowl but not announced until afterwards, to avoid distracting the team. It marked the first time since their inception in 1925 that the Giants had not been wholly owned and controlled by the Mara family.

== The Handley era ==
Following the departure of Parcells and Belichick—whom many people saw as the likely successor to Parcells—the surprise replacement of Parcells was offensive coordinator Ray Handley. Belichick left to coach the Cleveland Browns when it became clear he was not regarded as head coaching material by Young. He later coached New England to six Super Bowl victories, and said that he deems not being considered for the Giants head coaching position one of the biggest disappointments of his career. Handley was a somewhat reluctant coach, whose approach stood in stark contrast to the passionate and emotional style employed by Parcells.

=== 1991–1992 ===
As with Parcells eight years previous, one of Handley's first major decisions as head coach involved replacing Phil Simms as the starting quarterback. Jeff Hostetler, who had led the Giants to a win in the Super Bowl, was named as the team's Opening Day starting quarterback. Though the Giants won their opening game in an NFC Championship Game rematch against the San Francisco 49ers 16–14, they lost three out of their next four games to drop to 2–3. Though they rallied to a record of 7-5 after a dramatic 21-14 win at Tampa Bay in week 13 and were in the hunt for a post-season spot, the Giants lost their next three behind Phil Simms who reclaimed his starting position when Hostetler went down with a broken back. Hostetler threw five touchdowns in his 12 starts, while Simms threw eight in his four starts. The excitement that had surrounded the Giants the previous year was gone. One of the few promising young players to emerge during the year was second–year running back Rodney Hampton, who led the Giants in rushing with 1,059 yards, while also catching 43 passes. The season was also marked by the decline of Lawrence Taylor. Although Taylor still finished with a respectable 7 sacks, 1991 marked the first time in his career he was not elected to the Pro Bowl.

Throughout the 1991 season it was clear that the team's defense, which had led the league in points allowed in 1990, was declining. This deterioration continued in 1992, when the team finished 26th in the league in points allowed. The Giants started 1-3 with Simms at the helm, rallied behind Hostetler to take four of their next five to get to 5-4, but lost their next five after Taylor and then Hostetler joined Simms on the injured list. Six losses out of their last seven games meant a 6–10 record, their first double digit loss season since 1983. The team's pass rush, in particular, struggled after Taylor missed the last six games with a torn Achilles tendon. Handley, who had become unpopular with both players and fans, was fired after the end of the regular season.

== Dan Reeves arrives ==
Handley was replaced by Dan Reeves, the successful former head coach of the Denver Broncos who led the Broncos to three Super Bowls in four years, one against the Giants. After his dismissal from the Broncos, Reeves took the unusual step of lobbying heavily for the job. Especially after being publicly rebuffed by a number of candidates, George Young was pleased that someone with Reeves's credentials wanted the job, and Reeves was hired as Giants head coach. He had been a finalist along with Perkins for the team's head coaching position in 1979, but Young went with Perkins at the time because he felt he knew him better from their days together with the Baltimore Colts.

=== 1993 ===
The impact Reeves had was immediate. As Bill Parcells had done before in 1984, Reeves named Phil Simms the starting quarterback and then released Hostetler. They won their first three games, and five of their first six. The defense was back to its Parcells-era levels and allowed more than 20 points once all season. With two games to go, the Giants were 11–3 and battling for an Eastern Division crown and a first round bye. However, they were upset by Phoenix, 17–6, in the next to last week of the season, setting up a winner–take–all game against the Dallas Cowboys in the season finale. Though the Giants played well, it was Emmitt Smith's memorable performance with a separated shoulder that led the Cowboys to a 16–13 overtime win, giving the Cowboys a sweep of the season series. Despite the loss, the Giants made the playoffs as a Wild Card and won their first round game 17–10 over the Minnesota Vikings. However, they were then defeated by the San Francisco 49ers 44–3, in their worst performance of the season in the second round.

As he had done in 1984 when Bill Parcells restored him to the starting quarterback's job, Phil Simms responded with a solid season in 1993. Playing in all 16 games, he completed almost 62% of his passes, threw for over 3,000 yards, 15 touchdowns, and 9 interceptions. The season marked the first time in seven years that Simms started every game for the Giants. Simms, Hampton, offensive linemen Jumbo Elliot and center Bart Oates all made the Pro Bowl. In addition, Reeves was named Coach of the Year by the Associated Press. Following the season Lawrence Taylor retired and Phil Simms was released by the team, leading to his eventual retirement. Simms and Taylor had been the faces of the franchise since 1979 and 1981 respectively.

== See also ==
- New York Giants seasons
- Logos and uniforms of the New York Giants
- List of New York Giants players

== Sources ==
- Eskenazi, Gerald. A Sports-Writer's Life: From the Desk of a New York Times Reporter, Columbia: University of Missouri Press. 2004 ISBN 0-8262-1510-6
- Neft, David S., Cohen, Richard M., and Korch, Rick. The Complete History of Professional Football from 1892 to the Present. New York: St. Martin's Press, 1994 ISBN 0-312-11435-4
- Pervin, Lawrence A. Football's New York Giants: A History. McFarland 2009 ISBN 0-7864-4268-9
- Tisch, Jonathon and Weber, Karl. The Power of We: Succeeding Through Partnerships, Hoboken: John Wiley and Sons, 2004 ISBN 0-471-65282-2
- Whittingham, Richard. What Giants They Were. Chicago: Triumph Books 2000 ISBN 1-57243-368-X
- Walsh, Chris. New York Giants Football: Guide and Record Book. Illinois: Triumph Books 2009 ISBN 1-60078-189-6
- Ziegel, Vic. Giants in the Earth. New York. New York Media, LLC Vol. 16, No. 40 October 10, 1983 ISSN 0028-7369 (available online)
