= Brad Benson =

American football player (born 1955)

No. 60
- Position: Offensive tackle

Personal information
- Born: November 25, 1955 (age 70); Altoona, Pennsylvania, U.S.
- Listed height: 6 ft 3 in (1.91 m)
- Listed weight: 222 lb (101 kg)

Career information
- High school: Altoona Area
- College: Penn State
- NFL draft: 1977: 8th round, 219th overall pick

Career history
- New York Giants (1977–1987)

Awards and highlights
- Super Bowl champion (XXI); Second-team All-Pro (1986); Pro Bowl (1986); 99th greatest New York Giant of all-time; First-team All-East (1976); Second-team All-East (1975)

Career NFL statistics
- Games played: 137
- Games started: 123
- Fumble recoveries: 1
- Stats at Pro Football Reference

Brad William Benson (born November 25, 1955) is an American former professional football player who was a tackle for the New York Giants of the National Football League (NFL) from 1978 to 1988. He was a pivotal member of the 1986 Giants team that defeated the Denver Broncos in Super Bowl XXI. Benson was selected to the Pro Bowl in 1986.

Benson played college football for the Penn State Nittany Lions from 1974 to 1976 and attended Altoona Area High School. He was selected by the New England Patriots in the eighth round of the 1977 NFL draft but never played for the team. He resides in Flemington, New Jersey.

After his retirement, Benson became a businessman and began selling cars. He previously operated the Brad Benson Auto Group in South Brunswick, New Jersey, selling Hyundais and Mitsubishis. For years, Benson has appeared in various television and radio commercials for his business, including an ad that featured Lawrence Taylor and another that parodied former New York governor Eliot Spitzer. Another commercial saw Benson talk about a goalpost he purchased from the original Giants Stadium, which he referred to as his "40-foot erection".

In another commercial, in the middle of the 2010 Qur'an-burning controversy, he offered a free car to the man behind the controversy, Terry Jones, if he went back on his threat. Jones reconsidered and he collected the new car from Benson and donated it to a charity."

Benson and his family have lived on a 325-acre (132 ha) farm in Hillsborough Township, New Jersey. His younger brother Troy Benson played for the New York Jets from 1985 to 1990. On March 17, 2013, Benson's son Clinton was accused of hitting Flemington's Richard Lachner with his Nissan Frontier pickup at around 3 a.m. on Woodfern Road in Branchburg by the historic Neshanic Inn. Clinton Benson had entered an open guilty plea on Feb. 1, 2016, to third-degree assault by auto, fourth-degree possession of hollow-point bullets, possession of drug paraphernalia and several motor-vehicle offenses.

== See also ==
- History of the New York Giants (1979–1993)
