= Stacy Robinson =

American football player (1962–2012)

No. 81
- Position: Wide receiver

Personal information
- Born: February 19, 1962; Stillwater, Oklahoma, U.S.
- Died: May 8, 2012 (aged 50)
- Listed height: 5 ft 11 in (1.80 m)
- Listed weight: 186 lb (84 kg)

Career information
- High school: Central (Saint Paul, Minnesota)
- College: Prairie View A&M; North Dakota State
- NFL draft: 1985: 2nd round, 46th overall pick

Career history
- New York Giants (1985–1990)

Awards and highlights
- 2× Super Bowl champion (XXI, XXV)

Career NFL statistics
- Receptions: 48
- Receiving yards: 749
- Receiving touchdowns: 7
- Stats at Pro Football Reference

Stacy Ladell Robinson (February 19, 1962 – May 8, 2012) was an American professional football player who was a wide receiver for the New York Giants of the National Football League (NFL). He played college football for the Prairie View A&M Panthers and North Dakota State Bison.

== Early life ==
Robinson grew up in the Rondo neighborhood of Saint Paul, Minnesota. He attended Saint Paul Central High School.

== Professional career ==
Robinson was a second round draft selection of the New York Giants in the 1985 NFL Draft. Robinson's most notable game was in week 13 of the 1986 season, when the Giants were playing the 49ers on Monday Night Football. The Giants trailed 17–0 at halftime, but scored three touchdowns in the third quarter to win the game. Robinson caught the second touchdown, a 34-yard pass from Phil Simms, but he made an incredible grab on a 49-yard pass from Phil Simms, down to the 1-yard line, to set up the Giants' final score. He finished with 5 catches for a career-high 116 yards receiving as the Giants won 21–17. The Giants went on to win Super Bowl XXI that season over the Denver Broncos, and Robinson caught three passes for a team high 62 receiving yards in the big game.

== Death and legacy ==
Robinson died of Multiple myeloma.

In 2013, the City of Saint Paul renamed Oxford Field as Stacy L. Robinson Field to honor his legacy and efforts to improve the park facility.

== See also ==
- History of the New York Giants (1979–1993)
