= Solomon Miller =

American football player (born 1964)

No. 87, 83
- Position: Wide receiver

Personal information
- Born: December 6, 1964 (age 61); Los Angeles, California, U.S.
- Listed height: 6 ft 1 in (1.85 m)
- Listed weight: 185 lb (84 kg)

Career information
- High school: Compton (Compton, California)
- College: Utah State
- NFL draft: 1986: 6th round, 157th overall pick

Career history
- New York Giants (1986); Tampa Bay Buccaneers (1987)

Awards and highlights
- Super Bowl champion (XXI)

Career NFL statistics
- Receptions: 14
- Receiving yards: 241
- Touchdowns: 2
- Stats at Pro Football Reference

Solomon Miller (born December 6, 1964) is an American former professional football player who was a wide receiver in the National Football League (NFL) for the New York Giants in 1986 and the Tampa Bay Buccaneers in 1987. He played college football for the Utah State Aggies and was selected in the sixth round of the 1986 NFL draft.
