= George Young (American football executive) =

American football player, coach, and executive (1930–2001)

- George Young

Personal information
- Born: September 22, 1930; Baltimore, Maryland, U.S.
- Died: December 8, 2001 (aged 71); Baltimore, Maryland, U.S.

Career information
- High school: Calvert Hall (Towson, Maryland)
- College: Bucknell
- NFL draft: 1952: 26th round, 302nd overall pick

Career history

Coaching
- Baltimore City College (1959–1967) Head coach; Baltimore Colts (1968–1974) Assistant coach

Operations
- Miami Dolphins (1975–1978) Director of player personnel; New York Giants (1979–1997) General manager; National Football League (1998–2001) Senior vice president of football operations

Awards and highlights
- 3× Super Bowl champion (V, XXI, XXV); NFL champion (1968); 5× NFL Executive of the Year (1984, 1986, 1990, 1993, 1997); New York Giants Ring of Honor; First-team All-Eastern (1951)
- Executive profile at Pro Football Reference
- Pro Football Hall of Fame

George Bernard Young (September 22, 1930 – December 8, 2001) was an American professional football executive. He served as the general manager of the New York Giants from 1979 to 1997. He was named NFL Executive of the Year five times.

== Early life ==
Young was born on September 22, 1930, in Baltimore, Maryland. Young grew up in Baltimore's 10th Ward (east Baltimore) in a tough Irish-Catholic neighborhood. He was an outstanding football player at Calvert Hall College, a Catholic high school then located in Baltimore, Maryland. He attended Bucknell University, where he was a starting defensive tackle for three seasons, team captain in 1951, and a member of the Phi Lambda Theta fraternity. He was named to the Little All-America first team and All-East first team in his senior year. Selected to play in the Blue–Gray game, he was selected by the Dallas Texans in the 26th round of the 1952 NFL draft.

Young then began a coaching career in the Baltimore area school system, briefly at Calvert Hall and then he took over the Baltimore City College football team. During a 15-year span, his teams won six Maryland Scholastic Association championships. Tom Gatewood, tight end, and John Sykes, running back, were two of Coach Young's City athletes who would make it to the NFL, Kurt Schmoke, quarterback, and Curt Anderson, linebacker, established themselves in the political realm. Young was especially proud of his years as an educator, during which he taught history and political science. During that time he also earned two master's degrees from Johns Hopkins University and Loyola College. In May 1987, he was awarded an honorary doctorate in humane letters from Western Maryland College.

== Early career ==
Prior to joining the Giants, Young was on the staffs of the Baltimore Colts (1968–1974), holding positions of scout, offensive line coach, director of player personnel, and offensive coordinator, and the Miami Dolphins (1975–1978), serving as director of personnel and pro scouting.

== New York Giants ==
Young signed a five‐year contract to become general manager of the New York Giants on February 14, 1979. He succeeded operations director Andy Robustelli, who had resigned 58 days earlier on December 18, 1978. His selection was a compromise between the team's co-owners Wellington Mara and his nephew Tim, both of whom had been feuding over the football operations since the late-1960s. Wellington's attempt to promote assistant director of football operations Terry Bledsoe and Tim's recommendation of hiring either Gil Brandt or Don Klosterman had only resulted in mutual disapproval.

Young joined a franchise which had only two winning seasons and no playoff appearances (in any format) in the 15 years since advancing to the NFL title game in 1963. The drought was extended by The Fumble the previous November. The ensuing fallout cost Robustelli, head coach John McVay and offensive coordinator Bob Gibson their jobs. Wellington Mara had made the Giants' football decisions himself since joining the organization in the 1930s, and continued to do so even after becoming part-owner of the team upon the death of his father, Tim, in 1958. He had ceded some of his authority to Robustelli in 1973, but continued to have the final say in football matters. The fan revolt in the wake of The Fumble, however, finally convinced the Maras of the need to modernize. They were thus more than willing to accede to Young's demand that he be given complete authority over the football side of the operation.

In building the Giants Young placed special emphasis on the NFL draft. From his inaugural draft in 1979 through the 1995 selection process, he succeeded in signing every player drafted over that span, and from those drafts, a total of 119 players made the club at one time or another. Instrumental in his reversal of the Giants’ fortunes was his drafting of standout players such as Phil Simms, Lawrence Taylor, Joe Morris, and Carl Banks, and selecting Bill Parcells as the club's head coach.

For most of his tenure, Young acted as a go-between for Wellington and Tim, who only spoke to each other sporadically even after Young took over. Typically, Young would listen to one Mara's suggestions and run them by the other.

=== Success ===
During Young's tenure, the Giants earned eight playoff berths, highlighted by victories in Super Bowls XXI and XXV, and compiled an overall record of 155–139–2. He was named NFL Executive of the Year a record five times: in 1984, 1986, 1990, 1993, and 1997. Young also served as chairman of the NFL's Competition Committee.

=== Decline ===
Despite Young's success during the 1980s, that success would not continue into the 1990s. One of his first mistakes was his choice of a new head coach for the Giants after the May 1991 resignation of Bill Parcells. Young's selection of Ray Handley was not met with success as Handley won a total of 14 games in his two-year stint. Young—an opponent of free agency—seemed to lose his touch following the introduction of the free agency cycle following the 1992 regular season. He struggled to adapt to the system, along with the introduction of a salary cap in 1994; he signed several players to overvalued contracts while losing much of the Giants core talent to other franchises following free agency's inception.

In addition, Young's draft magic seemed to disappear. From 1991 to 1996, the Giants drafted six consecutive first round busts, although his later round selections during that time period would consist of several prominent, elite players, such as defensive tackle Keith Hamilton, defensive end Michael Strahan, cornerback Phillippi Sparks, linebacker Jessie Armstead, cornerback Jason Sehorn, fullback Charles Way, wide receiver Amani Toomer, and running back Tiki Barber. Young retired following the 1997 season, handing his duties over to assistant Ernie Accorsi.

George Young joined the National Football League as senior vice president of football operations on February 2, 1998, after serving 19 years as general manager of the New York Giants.

Young was a resident of Upper Saddle River, New Jersey.

Young died of a rare neurological disease on December 8, 2001, in Baltimore.

=== Honors ===
The George Young Award is presented annually by The National Jewish Sports Hall of Fame and Museum to the person, Jewish or non-Jewish, who "has best exemplified the high ideals that George Young displayed".

On January 15, 2020, Young was elected to the Pro Football Hall of Fame Centennial Class of 2020.

== See also ==
- History of the New York Giants (1979–1993)
- History of the New York Giants (1994–present)
