= Jim Burt (American football) =

American football player (born 1959)

No. 64
- Position: Nose tackle

Personal information
- Born: June 7, 1959 (age 67); Orchard Park, New York, U.S.
- Listed height: 6 ft 1 in (1.85 m)
- Listed weight: 255 lb (116 kg)

Career information
- High school: Orchard Park
- College: Miami (FL)
- NFL draft: 1981: undrafted

Career history
- New York Giants (1981–1988); San Francisco 49ers (1989–1991)

Awards and highlights
- 2× Super Bowl champion (XXI, XXIV); Pro Bowl (1986); 64th greatest New York Giant of all-time

Career NFL statistics
- Sacks: 20.0
- Fumble recoveries: 10
- Touchdowns: 1
- Stats at Pro Football Reference

James P. Burt (born June 7, 1959) is an American former professional football player who was a nose tackle for the New York Giants and San Francisco 49ers of the National Football League (NFL). Burt was a member of the Giants team that won Super Bowl XXI and the 49ers team that won Super Bowl XXIV. He played college football for the Miami Hurricanes.

== College career ==
Burt played college football at the University of Miami and was inducted into its sports hall of fame. Raised in western New York state, he had dreamed of playing for Syracuse, but they advised him to attend prep school first.

== Professional career ==
Burt joined the Giants as an undrafted free agent in 1981. He made the Pro Bowl in 1986 and finished his career with 20 quarterback sacks. Burt was respected throughout the league for his toughness and determination, which resulted in him going from being an undrafted rookie free agent to a Pro Bowler. He is also known for knocking out 49ers quarterback Joe Montana on a pass in the 1986 NFC Divisional Playoff game. Montana's pass was picked off and returned for a touchdown by Giants linebacker Lawrence Taylor. The Giants won, 49–3, on their way to winning Super Bowl XXI.

Although many people often credit Harry Carson and Lawrence Taylor with inventing the "Gatorade Shower" on coaches following wins, Burt actually created it 42 years ago in 1984. The Giants had finished 3–12–1 in 1983, last place in the NFC East and third-worst in the 28-team league. As Carson stated in his 1987 book Point of Attack: The Defense Strikes Back, head coach Bill Parcells was especially hard on Burt in practice. Parcells on the Thursday before the game made Burt raise a 20 lb (9 kg) dumbbell repeatedly off the ground in the weight room for 45 minutes to simulate raising his arm powerfully out of his stance at the snap of the ball. Burt exacted revenge on Parcells after a 37–13 home win over the two-time defending NFC champion Washington Redskins on October 28 by dousing him with a cooler of water. The following season, the Giants dumped Gatorade on Parcells on October 20; it was another home win over the Redskins, but after consecutive losses to Dallas and Cincinnati. This became a tradition in football, analogous to the champagne showers teams make in their locker rooms after winning a championship.

Burt was known to wear an extremely tight jersey causing him to stick out in a crowd. To protect against opposing players grabbing onto his jersey he opted to wear one that was several sizes smaller. He would need assistance pulling it on and off for each game, sometimes even using scissors to cut off the jersey after the game.

Burt battled back problems with the New York Giants which ultimately caused Parcells to announce his retirement in 1988. Burt, however, was not ready to retire and instead joined the San Francisco 49ers for the 1989 season. He won his second NFL title when they defeated the Denver Broncos 55–10 in Super Bowl XXIV.

During the 2006 season, Burt travelled to Dallas to give moral support to his former tormentor Parcells who was then head coach of the Dallas Cowboys. He also delivered a pre-game speech and stood on the sidelines exulting Dallas' defensive players.

== Personal life ==
Burt's son Jim Burt Jr. followed in his father's footsteps and went to the University of Miami, but played baseball rather than football for the Hurricanes. Jim Jr. also played for a Connecticut-based collegiate baseball team, the Torrington Twisters.

Burt lived in Allendale, New Jersey when he was playing for the Giants. He has since been a resident of Saddle River, New Jersey.

He played high school football in Orchard Park, New York, a suburb of Buffalo and the home of the Bills. His teammates at Orchard Park High School included Craig Wolfley, later an offensive lineman with the Pittsburgh Steelers, and Larry Pfohl, who found fame as professional wrestler Lex Luger.

== See also ==
- History of the New York Giants (1979-1993)

== Video ==
- You Tube - Jim Burt's sole NFL TD – Monday, September 5, 1988
