= Leonard Marshall =

American football player (born 1961)

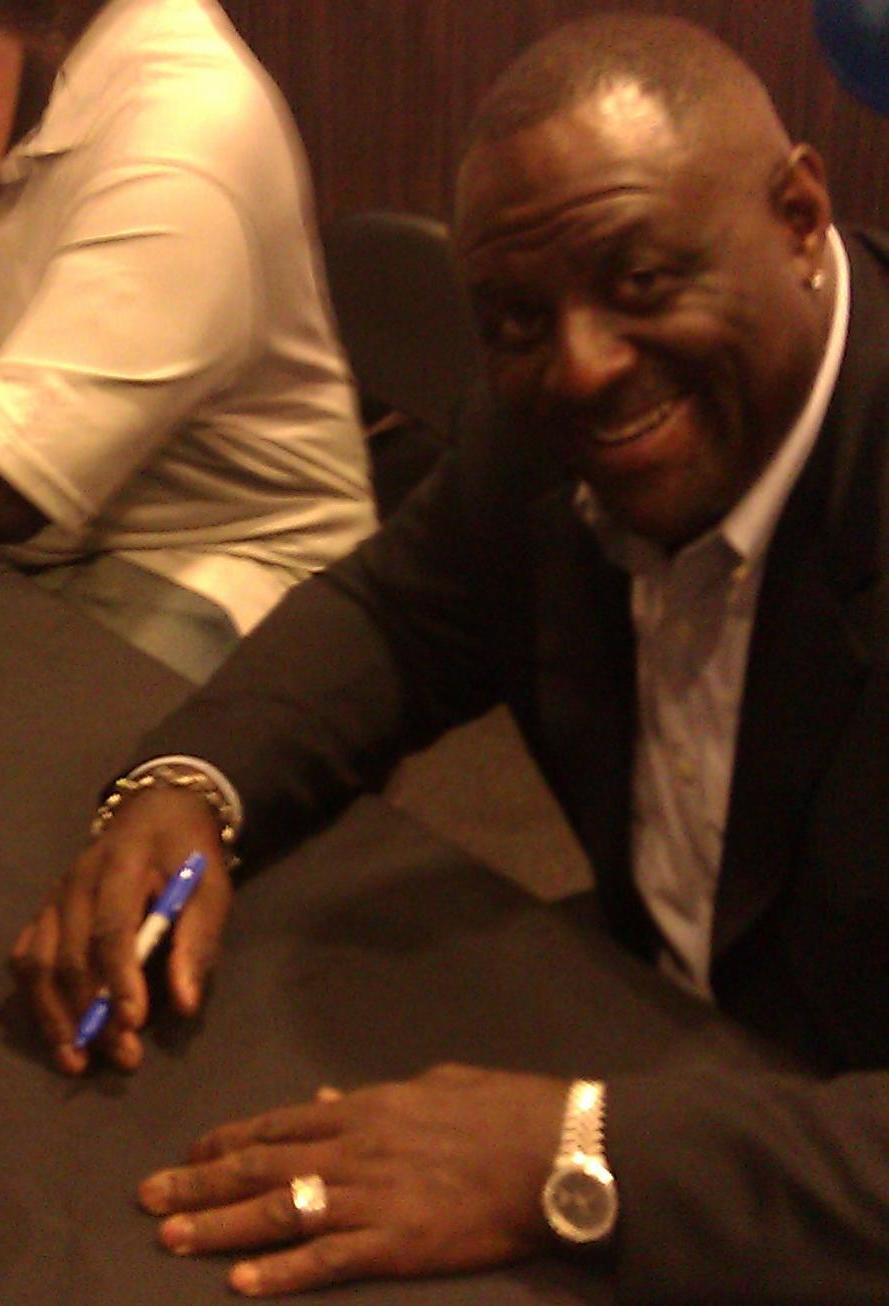
- Marshall in 2011

No. 70
- Position: Defensive end

Personal information
- Born: October 22, 1961 (age 65); Franklin, Louisiana, U.S.
- Listed height: 6 ft 3 in (1.91 m)
- Listed weight: 288 lb (131 kg)

Career information
- High school: Franklin (LA)
- College: LSU
- NFL draft: 1983: 2nd round, 37th overall pick

Career history
- New York Giants (1983–1992); New York Jets (1993); Washington Redskins (1994)

Awards and highlights
- 2× Super Bowl champion (XXI, XXV); 2× Second-team All-Pro (1985, 1986); 2× Pro Bowl (1985, 1986); New York Giants Ring of Honor; 26th greatest New York Giant of all-time

Career NFL statistics
- Games played: 177
- Sacks: 83.5
- Tackles: 714
- Stats at Pro Football Reference

Leonard Allen Marshall Jr. (born October 22, 1961) is an American former professional football player who was a defensive lineman for twelve seasons in the National Football League (NFL). He spent the first ten seasons of his career with the New York Giants where he accumulated 79.5 sacks, ranking him third in team history. He was twice selected to the Pro Bowl and twice named NFL Defensive Lineman of the Year following the 1985 and 1986 seasons. He won two championships with the Giants, recording three and a half sacks in the two Super Bowl games which he played in.

Marshall is most famously known for his 1991 hit on Joe Montana that knocked him out of the NFC championship game, after which Montana would not play another regular season game for almost two years. After his time with the Giants, Marshall went on to play a season each for the New York Jets and Washington Redskins before retiring from football at the age of 33. Marshall played college football at Louisiana State University.

Marshall has been active in several business and entrepreneurial activities since retiring. He also has spent time as a football camp instructor, a football head coach, written a couple of books, an Executive in Residence at Seton Hall University, an adjunct professor at Seton Hall University, and a radio broadcaster who made several appearances on The Howard Stern Show for 6 years starting in 1985-1991.

In 2013, Marshall was diagnosed with chronic traumatic encephalopathy (CTE), a degenerative brain disease detected in a growing number of retired NFL players. He has been involved with efforts to spread awareness about the issue and concerns of his fellow teammates and colleagues. Marshall is currently on the board of Carver Bank of Harlem, PikeTx.com, The Concussion Legacy Foundation, CaringKind of New York, and several other non profits. He is also an Outside Advisor at Rockefeller Capital Management of New York City where he works alongside Edward Moldaver, James Lee and Steve Cohen.

== Early life and college career ==
Marshall was born in Franklin, Louisiana. He was the oldest of seven children, whose father, Leonard Marshall Sr., was a foreman at a shipyard. Initially, Marshall's father did not like the idea of his son playing football, as he thought it was "a stupid game" that would prevent his son from doing more productive things. Later in his life however, Marshall Sr. expressed happiness over his son's success, and even rooted against his beloved Dallas Cowboys when his son's Giants teams played them.

Marshall played college football at Louisiana State University from 1979 to 1982, accumulating 180 tackles and 5 sacks during his four-year career. During his senior year, he recorded 53 tackles and 4 sacks and was named the team's defensive Most Valuable Player. Marshall also played a crucial role in LSU's 1982 victory over the University of Alabama, making several key tackles and prompting Hall of Fame coach Bear Bryant to state his regret after the game for not being able to successfully recruit Marshall. The team finished 8–3–1 that year and narrowly lost, 21–20, to Nebraska in the Orange Bowl.

Marshall graduated from Louisiana State University with a degree in Business Administration. He was later inducted into the LSU Hall of Fame in 2008.

== Professional career ==
Marshall was selected in the second round with the 37th overall pick by the New York Giants in the 1983 NFL draft. He was the fourth defensive lineman taken that year. At the time, Los Angeles Raiders managing general partner Al Davis described him as the steal of the draft.

During his rookie season with the Giants, Marshall struggled initially with weight problems, drawing the ire of the coaching staff. After trimming down, Marshall made an impact and played strongly against the run but was unable to mount much of a pass rush and finished with only 0.5 sacks on the season. He improved significantly in 1984 however, recording 6.5 sacks. He also made several key tackles to help the Giants preserve a 16–13 win over the Los Angeles Rams during the wild-card round of the playoffs.

Marshall's emergence as a pass rusher continued in 1985 as he racked up 15.5 sacks, earning him a trip to the Pro Bowl and recognition as NFL defensive lineman of the year. Marshall repeated both honors in 1986, teaming up with Hall of Fame linebacker Lawrence Taylor to form a potent pass rush on the right side of the Giants defense. He finished the year with 12 sacks, helping the Giants to a 14–2 record and an appearance in Super Bowl XXI to face off against the Denver Broncos. Marshall recorded two sacks in the Giants' 39–20 victory, earning him his first Super Bowl ring.

Marshall recorded 8 sacks in 10 games played during a strike-shortened 1987 season in which the Giants finished 6–9–1. He compiled another 8 sacks the following year as he split time with fellow defensive end John Washington. During the 1989 season Marshall collected 9.5 sacks, with the Giants losing in the first round of the playoffs that year to the Los Angeles Rams. Marshall later described the season as a lost opportunity as he felt the Giants had the best team in the league that year.

Marshall engaged in a prolonged contract holdout leading up to the 1990 season. He reported late, and after struggling initially to regain his starting job he recovered to finish the year with 4.5 sacks. The Giants went 13–3 during the regular season and advanced to the NFC Championship Game where the two-time defending Super Bowl champion San Francisco 49ers awaited them. In the fourth quarter of the game, Marshall hit 49ers quarterback Joe Montana so hard that he suffered a bruised sternum, bruised stomach, cracked ribs, and a broken hand. Montana was forced to leave the game and would not play another regular season game for almost two years (in December 1992), which ended up being his last game with the 49ers. The collision was later ranked as the third most "devastating hit" in NFL history by Fox Sports Net, and the third most "devastating hit" in sports history by The Best Damn Sports Show Period. It would also turn out to be the moment of Marshall's career that he came to be most well-known for. Marshall finished the game with four tackles, two sacks, and two forced fumbles, and was named NFL defensive player of the week. The Giants won the game 15–13 and advanced to Super Bowl XXV where they faced the Buffalo Bills. Marshall recorded the team's only sack in helping the Giants to a 20–19 victory, earning him his second Super Bowl ring.

Marshall continued to play at a high level in 1991 as he totalled 11 sacks for the year. In 1992, he clashed with new Giants coach Ray Handley however, and the two got into a well-publicized shouting match during halftime of a September game against Dallas. He ended up with four sacks on the year and entered into free agency afterwards. Marshall finished out his career playing a season each for the New York Jets and Washington Redskins.

Marshall retired from football at the age of 33. He later signed a ceremonial contract in 1996 that allowed him to retire as a Giant. Upon signing the contract he stated, "I wanted to retire as a Giant because it's where my career began. They were people who believed in my talents and helped mold me into the man I am today, and I wanted to thank them for that."

Marshall was selected to two Pro Bowls, and finished his career with 83.5 sacks in the regular season, and 7 in the postseason. His total of 79.5 as a Giant ranks him third in team history.

=== Career statistics ===
==== Regular season ====
Season	Team	GP	GS	Sk	Tkl	FF	FR	Int	Sfty
1983	New York Giants	14	6	0.5	39	0	0	0	1
1984	New York Giants	16	11	6.5	60	2	0	0	0
1985	New York Giants	16	16	15.5	99	0	0	1	0
1986	New York Giants	16	16	12.0	63	3	3	1	0
1987	New York Giants	10	10	8.0	68	1	0	0	0
1988	New York Giants	15	14	8.0	62	1	0	0	0
1989	New York Giants	16	16	9.5	81	2	0	0	1
1990	New York Giants	16	6	4.5	50	0	0	0	0
1991	New York Giants	16	16	11.0	80	0	0	0	0
1992	New York Giants	14	12	4.0	58	0	2	0	0
1993	New York Jets	12	12	2.0	37	0	1	0	0
1994	Washington Redskins	16	3	2.0	17	0	0	0	0
Career		177	138	83.5	714	9	6	2	2

GP: games played, GS: games started, Sk: sacks, Tkl: combined tackles, FF: forced fumbles, FR: fumbles recovered, Int: interceptions, Sfty: safeties

==== Postseason ====
Season	Team	GP	GS	Sk
1984	New York Giants	2	2	0
1985	New York Giants	2	2	1.0
1986	New York Giants	3	3	3.0
1989	New York Giants	1	1	0
1990	New York Giants	3	3	3.0
Career		11	11	7.0

== Life after football ==
=== Teaching and mentoring ===
Marshall hosted the Leonard Marshall Football Academy for a number of years, a football camp teaching the game's fundamentals to youth players between the ages 8 of 18.

Marshall served as a professor of Sports Management at Seton Hall's Stillman School of Business from 2004 to 2009.

In 2010, Marshall, himself a Catholic, was named head football coach at Hudson Catholic Regional High School in Jersey City, New Jersey.

=== Business activities ===
Marshall was founder of Pro Star Athletic, one of the largest sports licensed apparel companies of the 1990s. He later negotiated the sale of the company to International Apparel Manufactures Group of New York in 1999.

Marshall is a partner with the Playbook Franchise Fund, which invests in franchise businesses to provide stable income for high net worth individuals, in particular current and former professional athletes.

Marshall was named Vice President of Philanthropic Development for Seeman Holtz Financial Group in 2007. In 2015, he was named Director of Strategic Initiatives and Brand Ambassador for the publicly traded restaurant chain The Original Soup Man.

Marshall owned and managed The Marshall and Fox Sports Asset Management Group and was CEO and owner of Capital Source Mortgage.

In 2019 Marshall was named brand ambassador and advisory board member for the Apple Rush beverage company.

=== CTE diagnosis and advocacy ===
In 2013 Marshall was diagnosed with chronic traumatic encephalopathy (CTE), a degenerative brain disease linked to repeated head trauma that has afflicted many former football players. Tests for the disease were performed at UCLA using newly developed technology that allowed detection in living patients for the first time. Marshall says he began to notice symptoms such as memory loss, severe headaches, and mood swings in 2006, and that his erratic behavior took a major toll on the personal relationships in his life, including his marriage.

Marshall was part of a class action lawsuit against the NFL that initially resulted in a $765 million settlement, but was later amended to allow for a payout expected to exceed $1 billion. Marshall is involved with efforts to educate the public about concussion and head trauma issues, serving as a speaker for both the Practice Like Pros and Brain Unity Trust organizations. He was featured in the documentary United States of Football examining the subject of concussions in the NFL and youth league football. Marshall also founded the Game Plan Foundation to provide assistance for former athletes suffering from neurological disorders.

In a December 2019 interview, Marshall wondered aloud whether he has been kept out of the Giants' Ring of Honor because of his outspoken advocacy. He said, “I don’t want to believe that, because I think that when you look back on the powers that be and the gentlemen that are running the team now ... I would believe these men have a lot of respect for what I did as a player, both on and off the field, within the community, and the surrounding area, and what I continue to do to support the New York football Giants. I think that yes, I have been a little outspoken about [CTE], because I feel like I have a platform which allows me to do that, and to help my brothers who can’t help themselves.”

=== Medical cannabis ===
Marshall uses cannabidiol (CBD), a chemical extract of the cannabis plant, to treat the symptoms of CTE that he suffers from. He credits CBD with significantly improving his quality of life since he first started medicating with it in February 2016.

Marshall has spoken publicly in support of cannabis as an effective treatment option for mitigating the symptoms of head trauma-related health issues. He also says it can serve as a safer alternative to the pain-relieving opioid drugs that many NFL players become addicted to. Marshall has stated that the NFL should make allowances for the use of cannabis products as a medical treatment for players.

Marshall served as a keynote speaker and moderator at the Cannabis World Congress and Business Expo in New York City on June 15–17, 2016.

=== Other ===
Marshall hosted a radio show on WFAN in New York. Named The Leonard Marshall Show, it was recorded in Hollywood, Florida near his former residence in Boca Raton. Marshall currently provides pre-game and post-game commentary for Giants games on WFAN. During his time as a player, Marshall was a frequent presence on The Howard Stern Show and he co-hosted NY Football with Dick Lynch.

Marshall is co-author of When the Cheering Stops, a book about the Giants 1990 championship season that was released in 2010.

Marshall received a master's degree in Business Finance from Seton Hall University in 2007.

Marshall is a noted philanthropist who has received several awards in recognition of his charitable work.

Marshall currently resides in Paramus, New Jersey with his wife, Lisa.

== See also ==
- History of the New York Giants (1979–93)
- Living former players diagnosed with or reporting symptoms of chronic traumatic encephalopathy

== General references ==
- Mulé, Marty. Game of My Life: LSU: Memorable Moments of Tigers Football, Sports Publishing LLC, 2006 ISBN 1-59670-005-X
