= Bobby Johnson (wide receiver) =

American football player (born 1961)

No. 88
- Position: wide receiver

Personal information
- Born: December 14, 1961 (age 64); East St. Louis, Illinois, U.S.
- Listed height: 5 ft 11 in (1.80 m)
- Listed weight: 170 lb (77 kg)

Career information
- College: Kansas
- NFL draft: 1984: undrafted

Career history
- New York Giants (1984–1986)

Awards and highlights
- Super Bowl champion (XXI); Second-team All-Big Eight (1983)
- Stats at Pro Football Reference

Bobby Lee Johnson (born December 14, 1961) is an American former professional football player who was a wide receiver for three seasons with the New York Giants of the National Football League (NFL). He played college football for the Kansas Jayhawks.

He is best known as the receiver who caught Phil Simms' 4th and 17 pass in Minnesota in week 12 of the 1986 season. It is the play that many football historians feel turned the tide of the Giants championship run. The play set up Raul Allegre's game winning 33-yard field goal. The Giants won the game 22 - 20.

Following the 1986 NFL season, Johnson was traded to the San Diego Chargers. He was routinely late to practice as a result of his blossoming crack cocaine addiction and was subsequently cut two weeks later. In 1989, after years of homelessness and addiction, Johnson sold his Super Bowl XXI ring at a pawn shop in Nashville, TN for $250. Johnson has been clean since 2002. In 2016, Lee Einsidler, a sports fan, led the charge to reunite Johnson with his ring. Enlisting the help of Johnson's former head coach, Bill Parcells, Einsidler was successful in doing so.
