= Joe Cooper (kicker) =

American football player (born 1960)

No. 8, 3
- Position: Placekicker

Personal information
- Born: October 30, 1960 (age 66); Fresno, California, U.S.
- Listed height: 5 ft 10 in (1.78 m)
- Listed weight: 175 lb (79 kg)

Career information
- High school: Bullard (Fresno)
- College: California (1978–1982)
- NFL draft: 1983: undrafted

Career history
- San Diego Chargers (1984)*; Houston Oilers (1984); New York Giants (1986)
- * Offseason or practice squad member only
- Stats at Pro Football Reference

Joseph Donald Cooper (born October 30, 1960) is an American former professional football placekicker who played two seasons in the National Football League (NFL) with the Houston Oilers and New York Giants. Cooper played college football at the University of California, Berkeley.

== Early life and college ==
Joseph Donald Cooper was born on October 30, 1960, in Fresno, California. He attended Bullard High School in Fresno.

Cooper was a member of the California Golden Bears of the University of California, Berkeley from 1978 to 1982. He converted eight of 17 field goals and 26 of 27 extra points in 1978, one of three field goals and two of two extra points in 1979, six of 12 field goals and 21 of 21 extra points in 1981, and 11 of 23 field goals and 23 of 24 extra points in 1982. He did not attempt any kicks during the 1980 season.

== Professional career ==
Cooper went undrafted in the 1983 NFL draft. He signed with the San Diego Chargers on June 10, 1984, but was later released on August 13, 1984.

Cooper was signed by the Houston Oilers on November 12, 1984. He played in seven games for the Oilers during the 1984 season, converting 11 of 13 field goals and 13 of 13 extra points. He was released on August 27, 1985.

Cooper signed with the New York Giants on September 12, 1986. He appeared in two games for the Giants, converting two of four field goals and four of four extra points, before being released on September 25, 1986.

Cooper attended San Joaquin College of Law during his NFL career, and would fly between law school and games. He graduated in 1987, and opened Cooper & Cooper, LLP in 1993.
