= George Martin (American football) =

American football player (born 1953)

No. 75
- Position: Defensive end

Personal information
- Born: February 16, 1953 (age 73); Greenville, South Carolina, U.S.
- Listed height: 6 ft 4 in (1.93 m)
- Listed weight: 245 lb (111 kg)

Career information
- High school: Armijo (Fairfield, California)
- College: Oregon
- NFL draft: 1975: 11th round, 262nd overall pick

Career history
- New York Giants (1975–1988)

Awards and highlights
- Super Bowl champion (XXI); New York Giants Ring of Honor; 25th greatest New York Giant of all-time; Byron "Whizzer" White NFL Man of the Year Award (1986)

Career NFL statistics
- Sacks: 96.0
- Interceptions: 3
- Total touchdowns: 7
- Stats at Pro Football Reference

George Dwight Martin (born February 16, 1953) is an American former professional football player who spent his entire career as a defensive end in the National Football League (NFL) for the New York Giants from 1975 to 1988.

== Career ==
Martin missed only six games in his 14-year playing career (not counting games not played in because of strikes). He played college football at the University of Oregon in the then-Pacific-8 Conference and was drafted by the Giants in the 11th round of the 1975 NFL draft (262nd pick overall). He was a part of the 1986 Giants team that won a franchise record 14 games. In January 1987, Martin was one of the team captains for the Super Bowl XXI champions; late in the second quarter, Martin sacked Denver QB John Elway in the end zone for a safety, cutting the Broncos' lead to 10-9 where it held until halftime. They were the first two of twenty-six consecutive points scored by the Giants in the game.

In November 1985, Martin became the NFL's all-time leader in touchdowns scored by a defensive lineman (DL), with 5, when he returned an interception for 56 yards against the St. Louis Cardinals. (He had previously been tied at 4 with former Dallas Cowboy defensive tackle Bob Lilly.) In the following championship season, Martin became the league's career leader in touchdowns scored by a DL as a DL (at 6) when he returned an interception for 78 yards and 6 points in an late season home game against the same Broncos team they defeated in the Super Bowl, a feat which Giant head coach Bill Parcells has called the "greatest football play I've ever seen."

Martin's 7 NFL touchdowns came on 3 interception returns, 2 fumble returns/recoveries, one lateral return following a blocked field goal, and one offensive pass reception (in 1980, lining up as a tight end). (In November 2006, Miami's All-Pro defensive end Jason Taylor broke Martin's career record by notching his 7th defensive touchdown after intercepting a Brad Johnson pass.)

In addition, Martin amassed over 90 quarterback sacks in his Giants career (his official NFL total is 46 [the NFL did not begin counting sacks officially until 1982]; the Giants credit him with 96), during which time he was generally regarded as one of the league's most feared pass rushers. In 2004, he was inducted into the Sports Hall of Fame of New Jersey.

Martin has been a resident of Ringwood, New Jersey.

== Journey for 9/11 ==
On September 16, 2007, Martin began walking from New York City's George Washington Bridge to San Diego in order to raise money for medical care for the first responders to the September 11th, 2001 terrorist attack on the United States. Costing $150,000, Martin hoped to raise more than $10 million for this cause. World Wrestling Entertainment, among others, sponsored Martin's walk.

Martin received logistical and technological support from various organizations during the campaign. Sean Leone, former owner of S&L Services Inc., donated GPS tracking services to assist in monitoring and documenting Martin’s cross-country walk. The GPS data helped coordinate route planning, ensure safety, and provide real-time updates to supporters.

Martin planned to walk more than 3,000 miles across the nation, from the New York side of the George Washington Bridge to New Jersey, down to Washington, D.C., south to Interstate 40, then west, eventually leading to the Golden Gate Bridge in San Francisco. He hoped to finish his walk by March 2008.

Martin arrived in San Diego on June 21, 2008 after having walked over 3,000 miles. He said the total amount raised was about $2 million.

== See also ==
- History of the New York Giants (1979–93)
