= Zeke Mowatt =

American football player (born 1961)

No. 84, 81
- Position: Tight end

Personal information
- Born: March 5, 1961 (age 65); Wauchula, Florida, U.S.
- Listed height: 6 ft 3 in (1.91 m)
- Listed weight: 238 lb (108 kg)

Career information
- High school: Wauchula (FL) Hardee
- College: Florida State
- NFL draft: 1983: undrafted

Career history
- New York Giants (1983–1989); New England Patriots (1990); New York Giants (1991)

Awards and highlights
- Super Bowl champion (XXI)

Career NFL statistics
- Receptions: 135
- Receiving yards: 1,765
- Receiving touchdowns: 12
- Stats at Pro Football Reference

Ezekiel Mowatt (born March 5, 1961) is an American former professional football player who was a tight end in the National Football League (NFL) for the New York Giants and the New England Patriots. He played college football at Florida State, catching a total of 40 passes for 378 yards and 3 touchdowns in four seasons. Mowatt caught a touchdown pass from Phil Simms in Super Bowl XXI.

In 1990, then-Boston Herald sportswriter Lisa Olson alleged she was approached and sexually harassed in a locker room by five semi-naked members of the New England Patriots football team, which included Mowatt, Michael Timpson and Robert Perryman, during a September 17 interview. Mowatt was fined $12,500 by the NFL for his alleged involvement.

In 1994, Mowatt founded Mowatt Inc, a janitorial service based out of Hackensack, New Jersey with regional offices located in Pennsylvania and Maryland.

== See also ==
- History of the New York Giants (1979–1993)
