= Carl Banks =

American football player (born 1962)

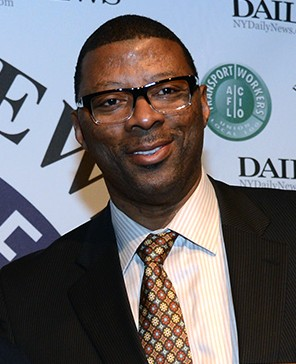
- Banks in 2014

No. 58
- Position: Linebacker

Personal information
- Born: August 29, 1962 (age 64); Flint, Michigan, U.S.
- Listed height: 6 ft 4 in (1.93 m)
- Listed weight: 235 lb (107 kg)

Career information
- High school: Beecher (Mount Morris, Michigan)
- College: Michigan State
- NFL draft: 1984: 1st round, 3rd overall pick

Career history
- New York Giants (1984–1992); Washington Redskins (1993); Cleveland Browns (1994–1995)

Awards and highlights
- 2× Super Bowl champion (XXI, XXV); First-team All-Pro (1987); Pro Bowl (1987); NFL 1980s All-Decade Team; PFWA All-Rookie Team (1984); New York Giants Ring of Honor; 17th greatest New York Giant of all-time; First-team All-American (1983); 3× First-team All-Big Ten (1981, 1982, 1983)

Career NFL statistics
- Sacks: 39.5
- Interceptions: 3
- Touchdowns: 1
- Stats at Pro Football Reference

Carl E. Banks (born August 29, 1962) is an American former professional football player who was a linebacker in the National Football League (NFL). He played from 1984 to 1995 for the New York Giants, Washington Redskins and Cleveland Browns. He played college football for the Michigan State Spartans.

== Career ==
Banks played high school football at Beecher High School, graduating in 1980. He played college football at Michigan State University and was the third overall pick in the 1984 NFL draft. He was selected by the New York Giants in the first round of the 1984 NFL draft with the third overall pick. He made the Pro Bowl in 1987, had 39.5 career quarterback sacks, and was a member of the NFL's 1980's All-Decade Team. He was a member of the Giants teams that won Super Bowls XXI and XXV as well as a key part of the Big Blue Wrecking Crew. Banks was a standout in their Super Bowl XXI victory in which he recorded 14 total tackles, including ten solo tackles. In 1993, Banks entered a three-year contract to play for the Washington Redskins. He was released from the Redskins after the 1993 season and spent his final two years with the Cleveland Browns before retiring after the 1995 season.

== Post-football career ==
After retiring from the NFL, Banks was a part-owner of the Arena Football League's New Jersey Red Dogs, along with ex-Giants Joe Morris and Harry Carson. He was Director of Player Development for the New York Jets in 1997. Currently, Banks can be heard as one of the voices of Sirius NFL Radio and WFAN. Starting in 2007, he became an analyst for the radio broadcasts of the New York Giants.

== See also ==
- History of the New York Giants (1979–93)
