= 1988 Dallas Cowboys season =

NFL team season

- Owner: Bum Bright
- General manager: Tex Schramm
- Head coach: Tom Landry
- Home stadium: Texas Stadium

Results
- Record: 3–13
- Division place: 5th NFC East
- Playoffs: Did not qualify
- Pro Bowlers: RB Herschel Walker

The 1988 Dallas Cowboys season was the franchise's 29th season in the National Football League. The team failed to improve on their 7–8 record from 1987, finishing at 14–23 and missing the playoffs for a third consecutive season. The 3–13 record in the 1988 season was the Cowboys' second worst season to that point in team history, surpassed only by its winless inaugural season in 1960.

The 1988 season was the final year for head coach Tom Landry, general manager Tex Schramm, and owner Bum Bright. It also featured the rookie season debut of Michael Irvin, one of the franchise's most accomplished players and a Pro Football Hall of Fame inductee.

== Offseason ==
=== NFL draft ===
1988 Dallas Cowboys draft
Round	Pick	Player	Position	College	Notes
1	11	Michael Irvin * ^{†}	WR	Miami (FL)	
2	41	Ken Norton *	LB	UCLA	
3	67	Mark Hutson	OG	Oklahoma	
4	94	Dave Widell	OT	Boston College	
6	151	Scott Secules	QB	Virginia	
7	178	Owen Hooven	OT	Oregon State	
8	205	Mark Higgs	RB	Kentucky	
9	232	Brian Bedford	WR	California	
10	263	Billy Owens	DB	Pittsburgh	
11	290	Chad Hennings	DE	Air Force	
12	317	Ben Hummel	LB	UCLA	
Made roster † Pro Football Hall of Fame * Made at least one Pro Bowl during career

=== Undrafted free agents ===
1988 undrafted free agents of note
Player	Position	College
Jean Austin	Cornerback	Rutgers
Sanjay Beach	Wide receiver	Colorado State
Kenny Blacknell	Linebacker	Appalachian State
Rodney Branch	Cornerback	Grambling State
Alvin Briggs	Safety	Auburn
Chase Brown	Wide receiver	Idaho State
Craig Burnett	Quarterback	Wyoming
David Caylor	Kicker	Long Beach State
Curtis Chappell	Wide receiver	Howard
Matt Clark	Wide receiver	Baylor
Ray Coleman	Defensive line	Florida A&M
Jason Cooper	Tight end	Duke
James Crawford	Running back	Eastern Kentucky
Kent Dean	Tight end	Kansas State
David Demore	Linebacker	Duke
David DenBraber	Quarterback	Ferris State
Bob Driscoll	Tight end	Northwestern
Tommy Duhart	Defensive tackle	Southeastern Oklahoma State
Jerry Dunlap	Defensive back	Youngstown State
Todd Friewald	Defensive end	VMI
John Garrett	Wide receiver	Princeton
Al Huge	Defensive tackle	Hillsdale
John Kropke	Defensive tackle	Illinois State
Jim Malosky	Quarterback	Minnesota Duluth
Stanley Monk	Running back	Duke
Kelly Ryan	Quarterback	Yale
Dewayne Terry	Safety	Duke
Sean Washington	Cornerback	Rutgers

== Summary ==
The 1988 season was the last of the Tom Landry era. After the 1988 season, the team would undergo drastic changes including a new head coach, and change of ownership from Bum Bright to current owner Jerry Jones.

Notable additions to the team in 1988 included wide receiver Michael Irvin and linebacker Ken Norton Jr. Defensive tackle Chad Hennings was also drafted in 1988 but, due to his obligations to the U.S. Air Force, he would not join the team until 1992.

The 1988 season was the first time since 1976 that future hall-of-fame running back Tony Dorsett was not on the Dallas roster. Dorsett had been relegated to a backup role to Herschel Walker for most of 1987 and was traded to the Denver Broncos during the offseason.

The 1988 season faced hardship from the release of the schedule. In 1987, Dallas had finished at 7–8, in a 3-way tie for second place in the NFC East and tiebreaking rules gave Dallas the “second place position”, even though Dallas finished fifth (last) in the NFC East in 1987 in “union games” (a strong replacement team, one which included several regulars who crossed picket lines, had inflated the Cowboys' record). As a result, their 1988 schedule was primarily against teams that were strong in 1987 (and also in 1988).

Steve Pelluer had won the starting quarterback job from veteran Danny White late in the 1987 season and won the job in training camp for 1988. Early in the season, White appeared briefly in relief roles before suffering a season-ending injury in week 7, which elevated Kevin Sweeney to the backup position. Sweeney briefly took over the starting job for Pelluer in weeks 11 and 12, but the results were poor and Pelluer regained the job.

In the season opener, Dallas lost to Pittsburgh, 24–21. The Cowboys had the ball inside the Pittsburgh 10 in the game's closing seconds in position to tie or win the game, but Pelluer was intercepted. After a close win over Phoenix in week two, Dallas lost to the New York Giants, 12–10 (the margin of defeat being a strange safety on the opening kickoff). A last-second goal line stand brought victory over Atlanta in week four but the following week, the Cowboys lost to New Orleans on a last-second Morten Andersen field goal. Two convincing losses followed and at 2–5, the season was in jeopardy.

In week 8, Dallas traveled to Philadelphia. Bad blood still existed from 1987, when Philadelphia coach Buddy Ryan, in the game's closing seconds, called a deep pass play when the Eagles were already leading the game by 10 points. The Cowboys roared to a 20–0 lead in the first half, but the Eagles came back to win 24–23 by scoring a touchdown on the game's final play. The next week, Dallas blew a 10–0 second-half lead to lose to the Phoenix Cardinals and fell to 2–7. The losing streak extended to 10 games before Dallas upset the defending Super Bowl champion Washington Redskins in week 15 in RFK Stadium, which eliminated the Redskins from 1988 playoff contention. The Redskins win marked the end of an era (and Landry's last win) but was also a harbinger as rookie (and future hall-of-fame) wide receiver Irvin caught three touchdown passes. The team lost the next week at Texas Stadium to the Philadelphia Eagles to finish the season 3–13, the worst record in the entire NFL and the team's worst record since 1960, the Cowboys' first season as an expansion team. A bright spot for the season was Walker, who led the NFC in rushing yards.

In addition to Landry, this was also the final season for long-time Cowboys such as president-general manager Tex Schramm, personnel director Gil Brandt, defensive tackle Randy White, quarterback Danny White, linebacker Mike Hegman, and defensive coordinator Ernie Stautner.

== Roster ==
Dallas Cowboys 1988 roster
Quarterbacks: 16 Steve Pelluer; 10 Scott Secules; 19 Kevin Sweeney; Running backs: 42 Darryl Clack KR; 46 Todd Fowler FB; 21 Mark Higgs; 30 Timmy Newsome FB; 34 Herschel Walker; Wide receivers: 87 Ray Alexander; 82 Cornell Burbage KR; 80 Everett Gay; 88 Michael Irvin; 83 Kelvin Martin KR/PR; Tight ends: 89 Thornton Chandler; 85 Steve Folsom	Offensive linemen: 62 Bob Brotzki T; 66 Kevin Gogan T; 68 Crawford Ker G; 61 Nate Newton G; 64 Tom Rafferty C; 79 Daryle Smith T; 63 Glen Titensor G; 65 Bob White C; 78 Dave Widell T; Defensive linemen: 99 Kevin Brooks DT; 77 Jim Jeffcoat DE; 72 Ed Jones DE; 73 Danny Noonan DT; 95 Mark Walen DT; 54 Randy White DE	Linebackers: 57 Ron Burton OLB; 59 Garry Cobb OLB; 55 Steve DeOssie MLB/LS; 53 Garth Jax OLB; 56 Eugene Lockhart MLB; 51 Ken Norton Jr. OLB; 50 Jeff Rohrer OLB; Defensive backs: 36 Vince Albritton SS; 40 Bill Bates SS; 26 Michael Downs FS; 38 Ron Francis CB; 45 Manny Hendrix CB; 31 Billy Owens FS; 24 Everson Walls CB; 23 Robert Williams CB; Special teams: 9 Roger Ruzek K; 4 Mike Saxon P	Reserve lists: -- Rod Barksdale WR (IR); 84 Doug Cosbie TE (IR); 81 Kelvin Edwards WR (IR); -- Chad Hennings DT (Military Reserve); 52 Jeff Hurd LB (IR); 79 Mark Hutson G (IR); 22 Victor Scott S (IR); 86 Mike Sherrard WR (IR); 71 Mark Tuinei T (IR); 11 Danny White QB (IR); 76 Jeff Zimmerman G (IR); Rookies in italics 47 active, 11 inactive

== Regular season ==
=== Schedule ===
Week	Date	Opponent	Result	Record	Game Site	Attendance	Recap
1	September 4	at Pittsburgh Steelers	**L** 21–24	0–1	Three Rivers Stadium	56,813	Recap
2	September 12	at **Phoenix Cardinals**	**W** 17–14	1–1	Sun Devil Stadium	67,139	Recap
3	September 18	**New York Giants**	**L** 10–12	1–2	Texas Stadium	55,325	Recap
4	September 25	Atlanta Falcons	**W** 26–20	2–2	Texas Stadium	39,702	Recap
5	October 3	at New Orleans Saints	**L** 17–20	2–3	Louisiana Superdome	68,474	Recap
6	October 9	**Washington Redskins**	**L** 17–35	2–4	Texas Stadium	63,325	Recap
7	October 16	at Chicago Bears	**L** 7–17	2–5	Soldier Field	64,759	Recap
8	October 23	at **Philadelphia Eagles**	**L** 23–24	2–6	Veterans Stadium	66,309	Recap
9	October 30	**Phoenix Cardinals**	**L** 10–16	2–7	Texas Stadium	42,196	Recap
10	November 6	at **New York Giants**	**L** 21–29	2–8	Giants Stadium	75,826	Recap
11	November 13	Minnesota Vikings	**L** 3–43	2–9	Texas Stadium	57,830	Recap
12	November 20	Cincinnati Bengals	**L** 24–38	2–10	Texas Stadium	37,865	Recap
13	November 24	Houston Oilers	**L** 17–25	2–11	Texas Stadium	50,845	Recap
14	December 4	at Cleveland Browns	**L** 21–24	2–12	Cleveland Stadium	77,683	Recap
15	December 11	at **Washington Redskins**	**W** 24–17	3–12	RFK Stadium	51,526	Recap
16	December 18	**Philadelphia Eagles**	**L** 7–23	3–13	Texas Stadium	46,131	Recap

Division opponents are in bold text

=== Game summaries ===
==== Week 1 ====
Week 1: Dallas Cowboys at Pittsburgh Steelers

Quarter	1	2	3	4	Total
Cowboys	7	0	7	7	**21**
Steelers	10	0	7	7	**24**

at Three Rivers Stadium • Pittsburgh, Pennsylvania

- Date: September 4, 1988
- Game time: 12 Noon CST
- Game attendance: 56,813
- Referee: Gordon McCarter
- TV announcers (CBS): Tim Brant (play-by-play) and Hank Stram (color commentator)
- Pro-Football-Reference.com

Game information

Cowboys

Steelers

Scoring summary

Quarter	Time	Drive			Team	Scoring information	Score	
Quarter	Time	Plays	Yards	TOP	Team	Scoring information	DAL	PIT
"TOP" = time of possession. For other American football terms, see Glossary of American football.							21	24

==== Week 2 at Cardinals ====
Week Two: Dallas Cowboys (0–1) at Phoenix Cardinals (0–1)

Quarter	1	2	3	4	Total
**Cowboys**	3	7	0	7	**17**
Cardinals	0	7	0	7	**14**

at Sun Devil Stadium, Tempe, Arizona

- Date: September 12, 1988
- Game time: 9:00 p.m. EDT
- Game weather: Sunny, 89 °F (32 °C)
- Game attendance: 67,139
- Referee: Red Cashion
- TV announcers (ABC): Al Michaels, Dan Dierdorf, and Frank Gifford
- Box Score

Team	Category	Player	Statistics
Cowboys	Passing	Steve Pelluer	12/24, 162 Yds, INT
Cowboys	Rushing	Herschel Walker	29 Rush, 149 Yds, TD
Cowboys	Receiving	Kelvin Martin	5 Rec, 72 Yds
Cardinals	Passing	Neil Lomax	20/34, 266 Yds, 2 TD
Cardinals	Rushing	Earl Ferrell	11 Rush, 65 Yds
Cardinals	Receiving	Jay Novacek	4 Rec, 78 Yds, TD

Scoring summary

Quarter	Time	Drive			Team	Scoring information	Score	
Quarter	Time	Plays	Yards	TOP	Team	Scoring information	DAL	PHO
1	6:55				Cowboys	47-yard field goal by Luis Zendejas	3	0
2	12:18				Cardinals	Earl Ferrell 16-yard touchdown reception from Neil Lomax, Al Del Greco kick good	3	7
2	4:35				Cowboys	Herschel Walker 3-yard touchdown run, Luis Zendejas kick good	10	7
4	5:23				Cowboys	Steve Pelluer 1-yard touchdown run, Luis Zendejas kick good	17	7
4	3:52				Cardinals	Jay Novacek 23-yard touchdown reception from Neil Lomax, Al Del Greco kick good	17	14
"TOP" = time of possession. For other American football terms, see Glossary of American football.							17	14

==== Week 3 ====
Week 3: New York Giants at Dallas Cowboys

Quarter	1	2	3	4	Total
Giants	5	0	7	0	**12**
Cowboys	3	0	7	0	**10**

at Texas Stadium • Irving, Texas

- Date: September 18, 1988
- Game time: 3:00 p.m. CDT
- Game weather: 82 °F (28 °C); Wind 16 mph (26 km/h)
- Game attendance: 55,325
- Referee: Pat Haggerty
- TV announcers (CBS): Pat Summerall (play-by-play) and John Madden (color commentator) (blacked out locally)
- Pro-Football-Reference.com

Game information

Giants

Cowboys

Scoring summary

Quarter	Time	Drive			Team	Scoring information	Score	
Quarter	Time	Plays	Yards	TOP	Team	Scoring information	NYG	DAL
"TOP" = time of possession. For other American football terms, see Glossary of American football.							12	10

==== Week 4 ====
Week 4: Atlanta Falcons at Dallas Cowboys

Quarter	1	2	3	4	Total
Falcons	7	10	3	0	**20**
Cowboys	14	0	2	10	**26**

at Texas Stadium • Irving, Texas

- Date: September 25, 1988
- Game time: 12 Noon CDT
- Game attendance: 39,702
- Referee: Bob McElwee
- TV announcers (CBS): Greg Gumbel (play-by-play) and Ken Stabler (color commentator) (blacked out locally)
- Pro-Football-Reference.com

Game information

Falcons

Cowboys

Scoring summary

Quarter	Time	Drive			Team	Scoring information	Score	
Quarter	Time	Plays	Yards	TOP	Team	Scoring information	ATL	DAL
"TOP" = time of possession. For other American football terms, see Glossary of American football.							20	26

==== Week 5 ====
Week 5: Dallas Cowboys at New Orleans Saints

Quarter	1	2	3	4	Total
Cowboys	0	7	7	3	**17**
Saints	7	7	3	3	**20**

at Louisiana Superdome • New Orleans, Louisiana

- Date: October 3, 1988
- Game time: 8:00 p.m. CDT
- Game attendance: 68,474
- Referee: Gene Barth
- TV announcers (ABC): Frank Gifford (play-by-play) and Dan Dierdorf (color commentator)
- Pro-Football-Reference.com

Game information

Cowboys

Saints

Scoring summary

Quarter	Time	Drive			Team	Scoring information	Score	
Quarter	Time	Plays	Yards	TOP	Team	Scoring information	DAL	NO
"TOP" = time of possession. For other American football terms, see Glossary of American football.							17	20

==== Week 6 ====
Week 6: Washington Redskins at Dallas Cowboys

Quarter	1	2	3	4	Total
Redskins	7	21	0	7	**35**
Cowboys	7	3	0	7	**17**

at Texas Stadium • Irving, Texas

- Date: October 9, 1988
- Game time: 12 Noon CDT
- Game attendance: 63,255
- Referee: Gordon McCarter
- TV announcers (CBS): Pat Summerall (play-by-play) and John Madden (color commentator)
- Pro-Football-Reference.com

Game information

Redskins

Cowboys

Scoring summary

Quarter	Time	Drive			Team	Scoring information	Score	
Quarter	Time	Plays	Yards	TOP	Team	Scoring information	WSH	DAL
"TOP" = time of possession. For other American football terms, see Glossary of American football.							35	17

==== Week 7 ====
Week 7: Dallas Cowboys at Chicago Bears

Quarter	1	2	3	4	Total
Cowboys	0	0	0	7	**7**
Bears	0	17	0	0	**17**

at Soldier Field • Chicago, Illinois

- Date: October 16, 1988
- Game time: 12 Noon CDT
- Game attendance: 64,759
- Referee: Jim Tunney
- TV announcers (CBS): Tim Ryan (play-by-play) and Dan Jiggetts (color commentator)
- Pro-Football-Reference.com

Game information

Cowboys

Bears

Scoring summary

Quarter	Time	Drive			Team	Scoring information	Score	
Quarter	Time	Plays	Yards	TOP	Team	Scoring information	DAL	CHI
"TOP" = time of possession. For other American football terms, see Glossary of American football.							7	17

==== Week 8 ====
Week 8: Dallas Cowboys at Philadelphia Eagles

Quarter	1	2	3	4	Total
Cowboys	17	3	3	0	**23**
Eagles	0	7	3	14	**24**

at Veterans Stadium • Philadelphia, Pennsylvania

- Date: October 23, 1988
- Game time: 12 Noon CDT
- Game attendance: 66,309
- Referee: Dick Hantak
- TV announcers (CBS): Verne Lundquist (play-by-play) and Dan Jiggetts (color commentator)
- Pro-Football-Reference.com

Game information

Cowboys

Eagles

Scoring summary

Quarter	Time	Drive			Team	Scoring information	Score	
Quarter	Time	Plays	Yards	TOP	Team	Scoring information	DAL	PHI
"TOP" = time of possession. For other American football terms, see Glossary of American football.							23	24

==== Week 9 ====
Week 9: Phoenix Cardinals at Dallas Cowboys

Quarter	1	2	3	4	Total
Cardinals	0	0	3	13	**16**
Cowboys	0	0	10	0	**10**

at Texas Stadium • Irving, Texas

- Date: October 30, 1988
- Game time: 12 Noon CST
- Game attendance: 42,196
- Referee: Bob McElwee
- TV announcers (CBS): Dick Stockton (play-by-play) and Dan Fouts (color commentator) (blacked out locally)
- Pro-Football-Reference.com

Game information

Cardinals

Cowboys

Scoring summary

Quarter	Time	Drive			Team	Scoring information	Score	
Quarter	Time	Plays	Yards	TOP	Team	Scoring information	PHO	DAL
"TOP" = time of possession. For other American football terms, see Glossary of American football.							16	10

==== Week 10 ====
Week 10: Dallas Cowboys at New York Giants

Quarter	1	2	3	4	Total
Cowboys	0	0	7	14	**21**
Giants	10	16	0	3	**29**

at Giants Stadium • East Rutherford, New Jersey

- Date: November 6, 1988
- Game time: 12 Noon CST
- Game attendance: 75,826
- Referee: Johnny Grier
- TV announcers (CBS): Verne Lundquist (play-by-play) and Terry Bradshaw (color commentator)
- Pro-Football-Reference.com

Game information

Cowboys

Giants

Scoring summary

Quarter	Time	Drive			Team	Scoring information	Score	
Quarter	Time	Plays	Yards	TOP	Team	Scoring information	DAL	NYG
"TOP" = time of possession. For other American football terms, see Glossary of American football.							21	29

==== Week 11 ====
Week 11: Minnesota Vikings at Dallas Cowboys

Quarter	1	2	3	4	Total
Vikings	17	0	17	9	**43**
Cowboys	0	3	0	0	**3**

at Texas Stadium • Irving, Texas

- Date: November 13, 1988
- Game time: 7:00 p.m. CST
- Game attendance: 57,830
- Referee: Red Cashion
- TV announcers (ESPN): Mike Patrick (play-by-play) and Joe Theismann (color commentator) (blacked out locally)
- Pro-Football-Reference.com

Game information

Vikings

Cowboys

Scoring summary

Quarter	Time	Drive			Team	Scoring information	Score	
Quarter	Time	Plays	Yards	TOP	Team	Scoring information	MIN	DAL
"TOP" = time of possession. For other American football terms, see Glossary of American football.							43	3

==== Week 12 ====
Week 12: Cincinnati Bengals at Dallas Cowboys

Quarter	1	2	3	4	Total
Bengals	7	17	7	7	**38**
Cowboys	3	0	7	14	**24**

at Texas Stadium • Irving, Texas

- Date: November 20, 1988
- Game time: 12 Noon CST
- Game attendance: 37,865
- Referee: Gordon McCarter
- TV announcers (NBC): Jim Donovan (play-by-play) and Ken Anderson (color commentator) (blacked out locally)
- Pro-Football-Reference.com

Game information

Bengals

Cowboys

Scoring summary

Quarter	Time	Drive			Team	Scoring information	Score	
Quarter	Time	Plays	Yards	TOP	Team	Scoring information	CIN	DAL
"TOP" = time of possession. For other American football terms, see Glossary of American football.							38	24

Until 2024, this was the last home loss to the Bengals.

==== Week 13 ====
Week 13: Houston Oilers at Dallas Cowboys

Quarter	1	2	3	4	Total
Oilers	0	10	3	12	**25**
Cowboys	7	3	7	0	**17**

at Texas Stadium • Irving, Texas

- Date: November 24, 1988
- Game time: 3:00 p.m. CST
- Game attendance: 50,845
- Referee: Gene Barth
- TV announcers (NBC-blacked out locally): Dick Enberg (play-by-play) and Merlin Olsen (color commentator) (blacked out locally)
- Pro-Football-Reference.com

Game information

Oilers

Cowboys

Scoring summary

Quarter	Time	Drive			Team	Scoring information	Score	
Quarter	Time	Plays	Yards	TOP	Team	Scoring information	HOU	DAL
"TOP" = time of possession. For other American football terms, see Glossary of American football.							25	17

This was the last home loss to the Houston-based team until 2024.

==== Week 14 ====
Week 14: Dallas Cowboys at Cleveland Browns

Quarter	1	2	3	4	Total
Cowboys	0	14	0	7	**21**
Browns	7	3	0	14	**24**

at Cleveland Stadium • Cleveland, Ohio

- Date: December 4, 1988
- Game time: 12 Noon CST
- Game attendance: 77,683
- Referee: Jerry Seeman
- TV announcers (CBS): Jim Nantz (play-by-play) and Ken Stabler (color commentator)
- Pro-Football-Reference.com

Game information

Cowboys

Browns

Scoring summary

Quarter	Time	Drive			Team	Scoring information	Score	
Quarter	Time	Plays	Yards	TOP	Team	Scoring information	DAL	CLE
"TOP" = time of possession. For other American football terms, see Glossary of American football.							21	24

==== Week 15 ====
Week 15: Dallas Cowboys at Washington Redskins

Quarter	1	2	3	4	Total
Cowboys	3	7	7	7	**24**
Redskins	3	0	14	0	**17**

at RFK Stadium • Washington, D.C.

- Date: December 11, 1988
- Game time: 12 Noon CST
- Game attendance: 51,526
- Referee: Jerry Markbreit
- TV announcers (CBS): Tim Ryan (play-by-play) and Dan Jiggetts (color commentator)
- Pro-Football-Reference.com

Game information

Cowboys

Redskins

Scoring summary

Quarter	Time	Drive			Team	Scoring information	Score	
Quarter	Time	Plays	Yards	TOP	Team	Scoring information	DAL	WSH
"TOP" = time of possession. For other American football terms, see Glossary of American football.							24	17

==== Week 16 ====
Week 16: Philadelphia Eagles at Dallas Cowboys

Quarter	1	2	3	4	Total
Eagles	0	10	7	6	**23**
Cowboys	7	0	0	0	**7**

at Texas Stadium • Irving, Texas

- Date: December 18, 1988
- Game time: 12 Noon CST
- Game attendance: 46,131
- Referee: Jim Tunney
- TV announcers (CBS): Tim Brant (play-by-play) and Hank Stram (color commentator) (blacked out locally)
- Pro-Football-Reference.com

Game information

Eagles

Cowboys

Scoring summary

Quarter	Time	Drive			Team	Scoring information	Score	
Quarter	Time	Plays	Yards	TOP	Team	Scoring information	PHI	DAL
"TOP" = time of possession. For other American football terms, see Glossary of American football.							23	7

=== Standings ===
NFC East
	W	L	T	PCT	DIV	CONF	PF	PA	STK
^{(3)} Philadelphia Eagles	10	6	0	.625	6–2	8–4	379	319	W2
New York Giants	10	6	0	.625	5–3	9–5	359	304	L1
Washington Redskins	7	9	0	.438	4–4	6–6	345	387	L2
Phoenix Cardinals	7	9	0	.438	3–5	6–6	344	398	L5
Dallas Cowboys	3	13	0	.188	2–6	3–9	265	381	L1

== Publications ==
- The Football Encyclopedia ISBN 0-312-11435-4
- Total Football ISBN 0-06-270170-3
- Cowboys Have Always Been My Heroes ISBN 0-446-51950-2
