= 1988 New York Giants season =

NFL team season

- Owner: Wellington Mara
- General manager: George Young
- Head coach: Bill Parcells
- Offensive coordinator: Ron Erhardt
- Defensive coordinator: Bill Belichick
- Home stadium: Giants Stadium

Results
- Record: 10–6
- Division place: 2nd NFC East
- Playoffs: Did not qualify
- Pro Bowlers: 2: LB Lawrence Taylor; FS Terry Kinard

The 1988 New York Giants season was the franchise's 64th season in the National Football League (NFL). The team finished 10–6, but due to the Philadelphia Eagles, who also went 10–6, completed a season sweep of New York Giants, a loss to the New York Jets in the season finale kept them out of the playoffs for the second consecutive season due to them also losing the conference tiebreaker to the Los Angeles Rams for the final wild-card berth. The season was marked early by the suspension for substance abuse of star linebacker Lawrence Taylor by the NFL for the first four games of the season. Following the end of the season, the Giants would see two longtime defensive stalwarts; defensive end George Martin and future Hall-of-Fame inside linebacker Harry Carson, announce their retirement.

== Offseason ==
=== NFL draft ===
1988 New York Giants draft
Round	Pick	Player	Position	College	Notes
1	10	Eric Moore	G	Indiana	
2	36	John Elliott *	T	Michigan	
3	62	Sheldon White	CB	Miami (OH)	
4	92	Ricky Shaw	LB	Oklahoma State	
5	118	Jon Carter	DE	Pittsburgh	
6	145	David Houle	G	Michigan State	
7	175	Mike Perez	QB	San Jose State	
7	186	Danta Whitaker	TE	Mississippi Valley State	
8	202	Sammy Lilly	CB	Georgia Tech	
10	259	Eric Hickerson	DB	Indiana	
10	265	Steve Wilkes	TE	Appalachian State	
11	286	Greg Harris	WR	Troy State	
12	313	David Futrell	DT	Brigham Young	
12	323	Brendan McCormack	DT	South Carolina	
Made roster † Pro Football Hall of Fame * Made at least one Pro Bowl during career

== Personnel ==
=== Staff ===
1988 New York Giants staff
Front office: President – Wellington Mara; General manager – George Young; Director of pro personnel – Tim Rooney; Head coaches: Head coach – Bill Parcells; Offensive coaches: Offensive coordinator – Ron Erhardt; Offensive backfield – Ray Handley; Receivers – Tom Coughlin; Tight ends – Mike Pope; Offensive line – Fred Hoaglin	Defensive coaches: Defensive coordinator – Bill Belichick; Defensive line – Lamar Leachman; Defensive backfield – Len Fontes; Defensive assistant – Mike Sweatman; Special teams coaches: Special teams – Romeo Crennel; Assistant special teams – Mike Sweatman; Strength and conditioning: Strength and Conditioning – Johnny Parker

=== Roster ===
1988 New York Giants roster
Quarterbacks (QB): 15 Jeff Hostetler; 17 Jeff Rutledge; 11 Phil Simms; Running backs (RB): 33 George Adams; 24 Ottis Anderson; 44 Maurice Carthon FB; 20 Joe Morris; 22 Lee Rouson; Wide receivers (WR): 85 Stephen Baker; 82 Mark Ingram Sr.; 86 Lionel Manuel; 80 Phil McConkey PR; 81 Stacy Robinson; Tight ends (TE): 89 Mark Bavaro; 88 Brad Beckman; 84 Zeke Mowatt	Offensive linemen (OL): 67 Billy Ard G; 76 Jumbo Elliott T; 69 Joe Fields C/G; 60 Eric Moore G; 63 Karl Nelson T; 72 Doug Riesenberg T; 66 William Roberts T; Defensive linemen (DL): 64 Jim Burt NT; 77 Eric Dorsey DE; 74 Erik Howard NT; 70 Leonard Marshall DE; 75 George Martin DE; 73 John Washington DE	Linebackers (LB): 58 Carl Banks OLB; 53 Harry Carson ILB; 98 Johnie Cooks OLB; 52 Pepper Johnson ILB; 55 Gary Reasons ILB; 51 Ricky Shaw ILB; 56 Lawrence Taylor OLB; Defensive backs (DB): 28 Tom Flynn FS; 41 Neal Guggemos CB/S; 37 Wayne Haddix CB; 48 Kenny Hill SS; 43 Terry Kinard FS; 36 Adrian White SS; 39 Sheldon White CB; 23 Perry Williams CB; Special teams (ST): 8 Maury Buford P; 6 Paul McFadden K; 65 Bart Oates LS	Practice squad None; Reserve: 2 Raúl Allegre K (IR); -- Mike Ariey T (IR); -- Henry Brown DE (IR); 78 Jon Carter DE (IR); 25 Mark Collins CB (IR); 68 Damian Johnson G (IR); 5 Sean Landeta P (IR); 38 Sammy Lilly CB (IR); 12 Mike Perez QB (IR); 62 Gary Schippang T (IR); 87 Tim Sherwin TE (IR); 83 Odessa Turner WR (IR); 27 Herb Welch S (IR); -- Danta Whitaker TE (IR); 71 Robb White DE (IR); 47 active, 15 inactive Rookies in italics

== Preseason ==
Week	Date	Opponent	Result	Record	Venue
1	August 7	at Green Bay Packers	W 34–3	1–0	Lambeau Field
2	August 14	New York Jets	W 24–21	2–0	Giants Stadium
3	August 20	Pittsburgh Steelers	W 28–17	3–0	Giants Stadium
4	August 27	at Cleveland Browns	L 13–17	3–1	Cleveland Municipal Stadium

== Regular season ==
=== Schedule ===
Week	Date	Opponent	Result	Record	Venue	Recap
1	September 5	**Washington Redskins**	**W** 27–20	1–0	Giants Stadium	Recap
2	September 11	San Francisco 49ers	**L** 17–20	1–1	Giants Stadium	Recap
3	September 18	at **Dallas Cowboys**	**W** 12–10	2–1	Texas Stadium	Recap
4	September 25	Los Angeles Rams	**L** 31–45	2–2	Giants Stadium	Recap
5	October 2	at **Washington Redskins**	**W** 24–23	3–2	RFK Stadium	Recap
6	October 10	at **Philadelphia Eagles**	**L** 13–24	3–3	Veterans Stadium	Recap
7	October 16	Detroit Lions	**W** 30–10	4–3	Giants Stadium	Recap
8	October 23	at Atlanta Falcons	**W** 23–16	5–3	Atlanta–Fulton County Stadium	Recap
9	October 30	at Detroit Lions	**W** 13–10 (OT)	6–3	Pontiac Silverdome	Recap
10	November 6	**Dallas Cowboys**	**W** 29–21	7–3	Giants Stadium	Recap
11	November 13	at **Phoenix Cardinals**	**L** 17–24	7–4	Sun Devil Stadium	Recap
12	November 20	**Philadelphia Eagles**	**L** 17–23 (OT)	7–5	Giants Stadium	Recap
13	November 27	at New Orleans Saints	**W** 13–12	8–5	Louisiana Superdome	Recap
14	December 4	**Phoenix Cardinals**	**W** 44–7	9–5	Giants Stadium	Recap
15	December 11	Kansas City Chiefs	**W** 28–12	10–5	Giants Stadium	Recap
16	December 18	at New York Jets	**L** 21–27	10–6	Giants Stadium	Recap
Note: Intra-division opponents are in **bold** text.

=== Game summaries ===
==== Week 1 ====
Team	1	2	3	4	Total
Redskins	6	7	0	7	20
• Giants	0	3	10	14	27

- Date: September 5
- Location: Giants Stadium, East Rutherford, New Jersey
- Game start: 8:00 p.m.
- Game weather: 72 °F (22.2 °C), wind 17 miles per hour (27 km/h; 15 kn)
- Referee: Dick Jorgensen
- TV announcers (ABC): Al Michaels, Frank Gifford, and Dan Dierdorf

Scoring summary
1	WSH	Chip Lohmiller 26 yard field goal	Redskins 3–0
1	WSH	Chip Lohmiller 25 yard field goal	Redskins 6–0
2	WSH	Ricky Sanders 29 yard pass from Doug Williams (Chip Lohmiller kick)	Redskins 13–0
2	NYG	Raúl Allegre 23 yard field goal	Redskins 13–3
3	NYG	Joe Morris 9 yard run (Raúl Allegre kick)	Redskins 13–10
3	NYG	Raúl Allegre 32 yard field goal	Tie 13–13
4	NYG	Tom Flynn 27 yard blocked punt return (Raúl Allegre kick)	Giants 20–13
4	NYG	Jim Burt 39 yard fumble return (Raúl Allegre kick)	Giants 27–13
4	WSH	Kelvin Bryant 19 yard pass from Doug Williams (Chip Lohmiller kick)	Giants 27–20

==== Week 3 ====
Team	1	2	3	4	Total
• Giants	5	0	7	0	12
Cowboys	3	0	7	0	10

- Date: September 18
- Location: Texas Stadium, Irving, Texas
- Game start: 4:00 p.m.
- Game weather: 82 °F (28 °C); Wind 16 mph (26 km/h)
- Referee: Pat Haggerty
- TV announcers (CBS): Pat Summerall and John Madden

==== Week 9 ====
Team	1	2	3	4	OT	Total
• Giants	0	3	7	0	3	13
Lions	0	7	0	3	0	10

- Date: October 30
- Location: Pontiac Silverdome
- Game start: 4:00 p.m. EST
- Game attendance: 38,354
- Game weather: Indoors (dome)
- Referee: Jerry Seeman
- TV announcers (CBS): Tim Ryan and Dan Jiggetts

Scoring summary
Q2	DET	Chadwick 15 yard pass from Hilger (Murray kick)	DET 7–0
Q2	NYG	McFadden 42 yard field goal	DET 7–3
Q3	NYG	Morris 1 yard run (McFadden kick)	NYG 10–7
Q4	DET	Murray 37 yard field goal	Tie 10–10
OT	NYG	McFadden 33 yard field goal	NYG 13–10

==== Week 13 ====
Team	1	2	3	4	Total
• Giants	0	7	0	6	13
Saints	3	6	0	3	12

- Date: November 27
- Location: Louisiana Superdome, New Orleans, Louisiana
- Game start: 7:00 p.m.
- Game attendance: 66,526
- Game weather: Indoors (dome)
- Referee: Fred Silva
- TV announcers (ESPN): Mike Patrick and Joe Theismann

Scoring summary
Q1	NO	Morten Andersen 27 yard field goal	NO 3–0
Q2	NO	Morten Andersen 41 yard field goal	NO 6–0
Q2	NYG	Stephen Baker 85 yard pass from Jeff Hostetler (Paul McFadden kick)	NYG 7–6
Q2	NO	Morten Andersen 26 yard field goal	NO 9–7
Q4	NYG	Paul McFadden 46 yard field goal	NYG 10–9
Q4	NO	Morten Andersen 45 yard field goal	NO 12–10
Q4	NYG	Paul McFadden 35 yard field goal	NYG 13–12

=== Standings ===
NFC East
	W	L	T	PCT	DIV	CONF	PF	PA	STK
Philadelphia Eagles^{(3)}	10	6	0	.625	6–2	8–4	379	319	W2
New York Giants	10	6	0	.625	5–3	9–5	359	304	L1
Washington Redskins	7	9	0	.438	4–4	6–6	345	387	L2
Phoenix Cardinals	7	9	0	.438	3–5	6–6	344	398	L5
Dallas Cowboys	3	13	0	.188	2–6	3–9	265	381	L1
