= 1988 Phoenix Cardinals season =

NFL team season (1st in Phoenix)

- Owner: Bill Bidwill
- Head coach: Gene Stallings
- Home stadium: Sun Devil Stadium

Results
- Record: 7–9
- Division place: 4th NFC East
- Playoffs: Did not qualify
- Pro Bowlers: T Luis Sharpe; WR J. T. Smith; PR Ron Wolfley

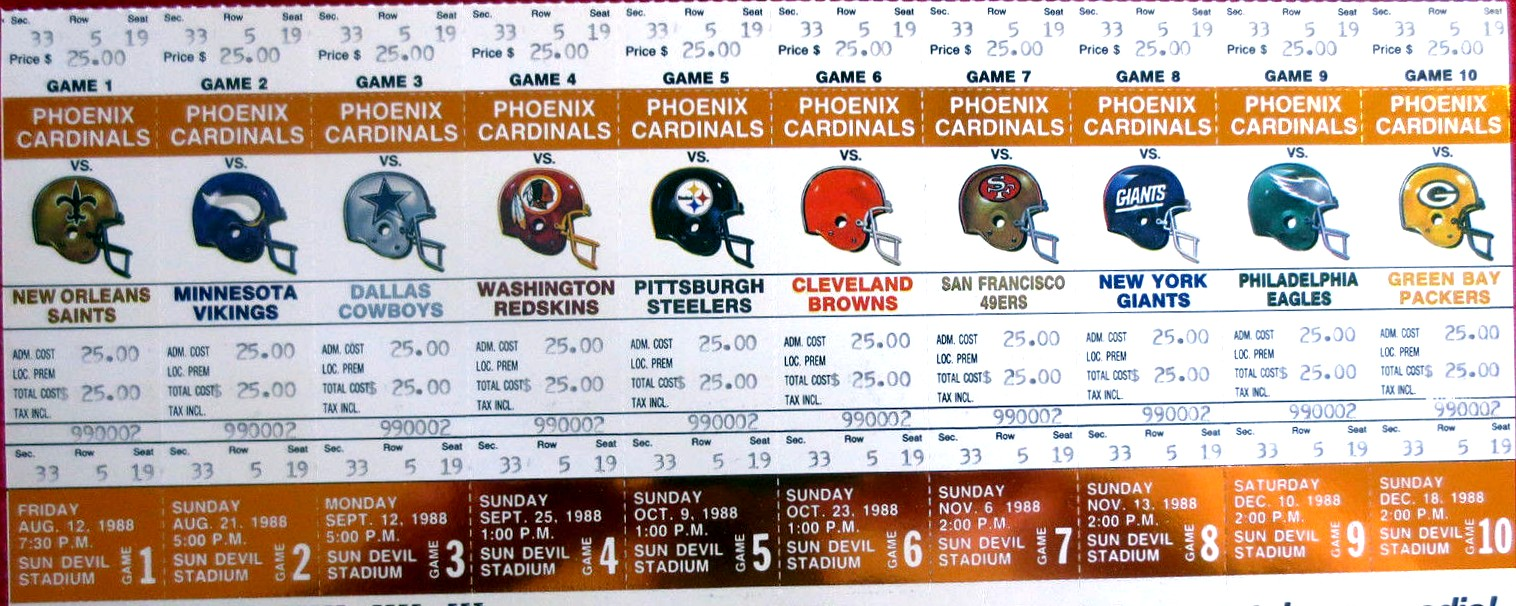
Season tickets for the Cardinals' 1988 inaugural season in Arizona.

The 1988 Phoenix Cardinals season was the franchise's 69th season in the National Football League and the first season in Phoenix. The Cardinals matched their seven wins from 1987, but finished with one more loss at 7–9, as 1987 was a one-game strike shortened season, and 1988 was a full 16-game season. With this move to Phoenix, the Cardinals became the first NFL team based in Arizona.

== Offseason ==
=== NFL draft ===
1988 Phoenix Cardinals draft
Round	Pick	Player	Position	College	Notes
1	12	Ken Harvey *	Linebacker	California	
2	38	Tony Jeffery	Running back	TCU	
3	68	Tom Tupa *	Quarterback, Punter	Ohio State	
4	95	Michael Brim	Cornerback	Virginia Union	
5	120	Chris Gaines	Linebacker	Vanderbilt	
5	132	Tony Jordan	Running back	Kansas State	
6	148	Jon Phillips	Guard	Oklahoma	
7	179	Ernie Jones	Wide receiver	Indiana	
8	206	Tim Moore	Linebacker	Michigan State	
9	233	Scott Dill	Tackle	Memphis State	
10	260	Andy Schillinger	Wide receiver	Miami (OH)	
11	291	Keith McCoy	Cornerback	Fresno State	
12	318	Chris Carrier	Safety	LSU	
Made roster * Made at least one Pro Bowl during career

=== Undrafted free agents ===
1988 undrafted free agents of note
Player	Position	College
Derek Andrews	Linebacker	Delaware State
Mike Bates	Quarterback	Miami (OH)
Steve Belton	Safety	Nebraska-Omaha
Scott Camper	Defensive tackle	Montana
John Clement	Guard	Northeast Louisiana
Michael Connors	Tackle	Purdue
Lorenzo Davis	Running back	DuPage College
Alfred Dorsey	Wide receiver	Nicholls State
Richard Haggerty	Defensive tackle	Oregon State
Anthony Hardy	Wide receiver	Purdue
Calvin Henry	Cornerback	New Mexico State
Michael Johnson	Defensive end	Temple
Scott Johnson	Linebacker	Northern Arizona
Lee Jones	Defensive end	Nebraska
Michael Simmons	Defensive tackle	Mississippi State
Pete Wahlheim	Safety	Southern Utah
Kennedy Webster	Safety	UTEP
Fred Wilburn	Defensive back	Fresno State

== Personnel ==
=== Staff ===
1988 Phoenix Cardinals staff
Front office: President – Bill Bidwill; Vice president and general manager – Larry Wilson; Director of pro personnel – Erik Widmark; Director of player personnel – George Boone; Head coaches: Head coach – Gene Stallings; Offensive coaches: Offensive coordinator – Jim Shofner; Running backs – Hank Kuhlmann; Receivers – Mal Moore; Offensive line – Tom Bresnahan; Special assistant/quality control – Leon McLaughlin	Defensive coaches: Defensive line – Jim Johnson; Linebackers – Joe Pascale; Defensive backs – Dennis Thurman; Special teams coaches: Special teams – Marv Braden; Strength and conditioning: Strength and conditioning – LeBaron Caruthers

=== Roster ===
1988 Phoenix Cardinals roster
Quarterbacks (QB): 15 Neil Lomax; 18 Cliff Stoudt; 19 Tom Tupa; Running backs (RB): 31 Earl Ferrell FB; 34 Jessie Clark; 28 Tony Jeffery; 30 Stump Mitchell; 36 Vai Sikahema; 24 Ron Wolfley; Wide receivers (WR): 81 Roy Green; 83 Don Holmes; 86 Ernie Jones; 87 Andy Schillinger; 84 J. T. Smith; Tight ends (TE): 80 Robert Awalt; 85 Jay Novacek	Offensive linemen (OL): 62 Ray Brown G; 74 Scott Dill; 70 Derek Kennard C; 76 Mark MacDonald G; 64 Todd Peat G; 67 Luis Sharpe T; 61 Lance Smith G; 76 Mark Traynowicz T; Defensive linemen (DL): 60 Steve Alvord DT; 79 Bob Clasby DT; 65 David Galloway DE; 95 Sean McNanie DE; 78 Freddie Joe Nunn DE; 72 Rod Saddler DE	Linebackers (LB): 55 Anthony Bell OLB; 53 Wayne Davis OLB; 56 Ken Harvey OLB; 51 Ricky Hunley MLB; 59 Tyrone Jones OLB; 54 E. J. Junior OLB; 57 Niko Noga MLB; Defensive backs (DB): 41 Carl Carter CB; 44 Mike Brim CB; 47 Cedric Mack CB; 26 Lester Lyles FS; 46 Tim McDonald SS; 25 Roland Mitchell CB; 48 Reggie Phillips CB; Special teams (ST): 11 Greg Horne P; 17 Al Del Greco K; 89 Mark Walczak LS	Reserve: 71 Joe Bostic G (IR); 75 Curtis Greer DE (IR); 32 Tony Jordan RB (IR); 35 Robert Mimbs RB (IR); 68 Mike Morris (IR); 63 Tootie Robbins T (IR); 69 Colin Scotts DT (IR); 97 Chris Spachman DT (IR); 43 Lonnie Young S (IR); Rookies in italics 47 active, 9 reserve

== Regular season ==
=== Schedule ===
Week	Date	Opponent	Result	Record	Venue	Attendance	Recap
1	September 4	at Cincinnati Bengals	**L** 14–21	0–1	Riverfront Stadium	50,404	Recap
2	September 12	**Dallas Cowboys**	**L** 14–17	0–2	Sun Devil Stadium	67,139	Recap
3	September 18	at Tampa Bay Buccaneers	**W** 30–24	1–2	Tampa Stadium	35,034	Recap
4	September 25	**Washington Redskins**	**W** 30–21	2–2	Sun Devil Stadium	61,973	Recap
5	October 2	at Los Angeles Rams	**W** 41–27	3–2	Anaheim Stadium	49,830	Recap
6	October 9	Pittsburgh Steelers	**W** 31–14	4–2	Sun Devil Stadium	53,278	Recap
7	October 16	at **Washington Redskins**	**L** 17–33	4–3	RFK Stadium	54,402	Recap
8	October 23	Cleveland Browns	**L** 21–29	4–4	Sun Devil Stadium	61,261	Recap
9	October 30	at **Dallas Cowboys**	**W** 16–10	5–4	Texas Stadium	42,196	Recap
10	November 6	San Francisco 49ers	**W** 24–23	6–4	Sun Devil Stadium	64,544	Recap
11	November 13	**New York Giants**	**W** 24–17	7–4	Sun Devil Stadium	65,324	Recap
12	November 20	at Houston Oilers	**L** 20–38	7–5	Houston Astrodome	43,843	Recap
13	November 27	at **Philadelphia Eagles**	**L** 21–31	7–6	Veterans Stadium	57,918	Recap
14	December 4	at **New York Giants**	**L** 7–44	7–7	Giants Stadium	73,438	Recap
15	December 10	**Philadelphia Eagles**	**L** 17–23	7–8	Sun Devil Stadium	54,832	Recap
16	December 18	Green Bay Packers	**L** 17–26	7–9	Sun Devil Stadium	44,586	Recap
Note: Intra-division opponents are in **bold** text.

=== Standings ===
NFC East
	W	L	T	PCT	DIV	CONF	PF	PA	STK
^{(3)} Philadelphia Eagles	10	6	0	.625	6–2	8–4	379	319	W2
New York Giants	10	6	0	.625	5–3	9–5	359	304	L1
Washington Redskins	7	9	0	.438	4–4	6–6	345	387	L2
Phoenix Cardinals	7	9	0	.438	3–5	6–6	344	398	L5
Dallas Cowboys	3	13	0	.188	2–6	3–9	265	381	L1

== Game summaries ==
=== Week 1: at Cincinnati Bengals ===
Week 1: Phoenix Cardinals at Cincinnati Bengals – Game summary

Quarter	1	2	3	4	Total
Cardinals	0	7	7	0	14
Bengals	0	7	7	7	21

at Riverfront Stadium, Cincinnati, Ohio

- Date: September 4
- Game time: 1:00 p.m. EDT/10:00 a.m. MST
- Game weather: 68 °F (20 °C)
- Game attendance: 50,404
- Box Score

Game information

First quarter

- No scoring plays.

Second quarter

- PHO – Stump Mitchell 4-yard pass from Neil Lomax (Al Del Greco kick). Cardinals 7–0.
- CIN – James Brooks 25-yard pass from Boomer Esiason (Jim Breech kick). Tied 7–7.

Third quarter

- PHO – Roy Green 29-yard pass from Neil Lomax (Al Del Greco kick). Cardinals 14–7.
- CIN – Eddie Brown 61-yard pass from Boomer Esiason (Jim Breech kick). Tied 14–14.

Fourth quarter

- CIN – Eddie Brown 61-yard pass from Boomer Esiason (Jim Breech kick). Bengals 21–14.

Top passers

- PHO – Neil Lomax – 21/31, 227 yards, 2 TD, 2 INT
- CIN – Boomer Esiason – 17/26, 271 yards, 3 TD, INT

Top rushers

- PHO – Stump Mitchell – 22 rushes, 110 yards
- CIN – James Brooks – 9 rushes, 75 yards

Top receivers

- PHO – J. T. Smith – 7 receptions, 98 yards
- CIN – Eddie Brown – 6 receptions, 143 yards, TD

=== Week 2: vs. Dallas Cowboys ===
Week 2: Dallas Cowboys at Phoenix Cardinals – Game summary

Quarter	1	2	3	4	Total
Cowboys	3	7	0	7	17
Cardinals	0	7	0	7	14

at Sun Devil Stadium, Tempe, Arizona

- Date: September 12
- Game time: 6:00 p.m. MST
- Game weather: Sunny, 89 °F (32 °C)
- Game attendance: 67,139
- Referee: Red Cashion
- TV announcers (ABC): Al Michaels, Dan Dierdorf, and Frank Gifford
- Box Score

Game information

First quarter

- DAL – Luis Zendejas 47-yard field goal, 6:55. Cowboys 3–0.

Second quarter

- PHO – Earl Ferrell 16-yard pass from Neil Lomax (Al Del Greco kick), 12:18. Cardinals 7–3.
- DAL – Herschel Walker 3-yard run (Luis Zendejas kick), 4:35. Cowboys 10–7.

Third quarter

- No scoring plays.

Fourth quarter

- DAL – Steve Pelluer 1-yard run (Luis Zendejas kick), 5:23. Cowboys 17–7.
- PHO – Jay Novacek 23-yard pass from Neil Lomax (Al Del Greco kick), 3:52. Cowboys 17–14.

Top passers

- DAL – Steve Pelluer – 12/24, 162 yards, INT
- PHO – Neil Lomax – 20/34, 266 yards, 2 TD

Top rushers

- DAL – Herschel Walker – 29 rushes, 149 yards, TD
- PHO – Earl Ferrell – 11 rushes, 65 yards

Top receivers

- DAL – Kelvin Martin – 5 receptions, 72 yards
- PHO – Jay Novacek – 4 receptions, 178 yards, TD

=== Week 3: at Tampa Bay Buccaneers ===
Week 3: Phoenix Cardinals at Tampa Bay Buccaneers – Game summary

Quarter	1	2	3	4	Total
Cardinals	13	7	3	7	30
Buccaneers	0	3	7	14	24

at Tampa Stadium, Tampa, Florida

- Date: September 18
- Game time: 1:00 p.m. EDT/10:00 a.m. MST
- Game weather: 81 °F (27 °C)
- Game attendance: 35,034
- Box Score

Game information

First quarter

- PHO – Al Del Greco 47-yard field goal. Cardinals 3–0.
- PHO – Stump Mitchell 6-yard run (Al Del Greco kick). Cardinals 10–0.
- PHO – Al Del Greco 37-yard field goal. Cardinals 13–0.

Second quarter

- TB – Donald Igwebuike 34-yard field goal. Cardinals 13–3.
- PHO – Earl Ferrell 1-yard run (Al Del Greco kick). Cardinals 20–3.

Third quarter

- TB – Bruce Hill 23-yard pass from Vinny Testaverde (Donald Igwebuike kick). Cardinals 20–10.
- PHO – Al Del Greco 23-yard field goal. Cardinals 23–10.

Fourth quarter

- TB – James Wilder 5-yard run (Donald Igwebuike kick). Cardinals 23–17.
- TB – Lars Tate 47-yard run (Donald Igwebuike kick). Buccaneers 24–23.
- PHO – Jay Novacek 42-yard pass from Cliff Stoudt (Al Del Greco kick). Cardinals 30–24.

Top passers

- PHO – Cliff Stoudt – 9/19, 149 yards, TD
- TB – Vinny Testaverde – 16/28, 211 yards, TD, 2 INT

Top rushers

- PHO – Stump Mitchell – 18 rushes, 110 yards, TD
- TB – Lars Tate – 4 rushes, 54 yards, TD

Top receivers

- PHO – J. T. Smith – 6 receptions, 103 yards
- TB – Bruce Hill – 4 receptions, 80 yards, TD

=== Week 4: vs. Washington Redskins ===
Week 4: Washington Redskins at Phoenix Cardinals – Game summary

Quarter	1	2	3	4	Total
Redskins	7	7	0	7	21
Cardinals	2	7	7	14	30

at Sun Devil Stadium, Tempe, Arizona

- Date: September 25
- Game time: 4:00 p.m. MST
- Game weather: 84 °F (29 °C)
- Game attendance: 61,973
- Box Score

Game information

First quarter

- WAS – Art Monk 23-yard pass from Mark Rypien (Chip Lohmiller kick. Redskins 7–0.
- PHO - Team safety. Redskins 7-2

Second quarter

- PHO – Tony Jordan 1-yard run (Al Del Greco kick). Cardinals 9–7.
- WAS – Ricky Sanders 18-yard pass from Mark Rypien (Chip Lohmiller kick). Redskins 14–9.

Third quarter

- PHO – Tony Jordan 1-yard run (Al Del Greco kick). Cardinals 16–14.

Fourth quarter

- PHO – Roy Green 27-yard pass from Neil Lomax (Al Del Greco kick). Cardinals 23–14.
- DAL – Anthony Allen 2-yard pass from Mark Rypien (Chip Lohmiller kick). Cardinals 23-21.
- PHO – Cedric Mack 45-yard fumble return (Al Del Greco kick). Cardinals 30–21.

Top passers

- WAS – Mark Rypien – 26/41, 303 yards, 3 TD, INT
- PHO – Neil Lomax – 8/17, 159 yards, TD, INT

Top rushers

- WAS – Timmy Smith – 18 rushes, 54 yards
- PHO – Earl Ferrell – 19 rushes, 108 yards

Top receivers

- WAS – Art Monk – 6 receptions, 92 yards, TD
- PHO – Roy Green – 2 receptions, 79 yards, TD

=== Week 5: at Los Angeles Rams ===
Week 5: Phoenix Cardinals at Los Angeles Rams – Game summary

Quarter	1	2	3	4	Total
Cardinals	10	14	3	14	41
Rams	7	7	6	7	27

at Anaheim Stadium, Anaheim, California

- Date: October 2
- Game time: 1:00 p.m. PDT/1:00 p.m. MST
- Game weather: 64 °F (18 °C)
- Game attendance: 49,830
- Box Score

Game information

First quarter

- LA – Greg Bell 5-yard run (Mike Lansford kick). Rams 7–0.
- PHO – Roy Green 33-yard pass from Neil Lomax (Al Del Greco kick). Tied 7–7.
- PHO – Al Del Greco 43-yard field goal. Cardinals 10–7.

Second quarter

- LA – Greg Bell 34-yard 5-yard run (Mike Lansford kick). Rams 14–10.
- PHO – Jay Novacek 8-yard pass from Neil Lomax (Al Del Greco kick). Cardinals 17–14.
- PHO – Rod Saddler 16-yard fumble return (Al Del Greco kick). Cardinals 24–14.

Third quarter

- PHO – Al Del Greco 51-yard field goal. Cardinals 27–14.
- LA – Damone Johnson 9-yard pass from Jim Everett (kick failed). Cardinals 27–20.

Fourth quarter

- PHO – Earl Ferrell 7-yard run (Al Del Greco kick). Cardinals 34–20.
- PHO – Stump Mitchell 35-yard run (Al Del Greco kick). Cardinals 41–20.
- LA – Greg Bell 1-yard run (Mike Lansford kick). Cardinals 41–27.

Top passers

- PHO – Neil Lomax – 28/43, 342 yards, 2 TD, INT
- LA – Jim Everett – 25/33, 300 yards, TD

Top rushers

- PHO – Earl Ferrell – 16 rushes, 97 yards, TD
- LA – Greg Bell – 18 rushes, 82 yards, 3 TD

Top receivers

- PHO – Jay Novacek – 9 receptions, 92 yards, TD
- LA – Henry Ellard – 6 receptions, 96 yards

=== Week 6: vs. Pittsburgh Steelers ===
Week 6: Pittsburgh Steelers at Phoenix Cardinals – Game summary

Quarter	1	2	3	4	Total
Steelers	7	0	0	7	14
Cardinals	7	17	7	0	31

at Sun Devil Stadium, Tempe, Arizona

- Date: October 9
- Game time: 2:00 p.m. MST
- Game weather: 84 °F (29 °C)
- Game attendance: 53,278
- Box Score

Game information

First quarter

- PHO – Robert Awalt 32-yard pass from Neil Lomax (Al Del Greco kick. Cardinals 7–0.
- PIT - Rod Woodson 92-yard kickoff return (Gary Anderson kick). Tied 7–7

Second quarter

- PHO – Al Del Greco 19-yard field goak. Cardinals 10–7.
- PHO – Tony Jordan 1-yard run (Al Del Greco kick). Cardinals 17–7.
- PHO – J. T. Smith 3-yard pass from Neil Lomax (Al Del Greco kick). Cardinals 24–7.

Third quarter

- PHO – J. T. Smith 13-yard pass from Neil Lomax (Al Del Greco kick). Cardinals 31–7.

Fourth quarter

- DAL – Merril Hoge 12-yard pass from Steve Bono (Gary Anderson kick). Cardinals 31-14.

Top passers

- PIT – Todd Blackledge – 8/20, 114 yards
- PHO – Neil Lomax – 17/26, 291 yards, 3 TD, INT

Top rushers

- PIT – Merril Hoge – 5 rushes, 34 yards
- PHO – Earl Ferrell – 17 rushes, 39 yards

Top receivers

- PIT – Louis Lipps – 3 receptions, 42 yards
- PHO – Roy Green – 4 receptions, 119 yards

=== Week 7: at Washington Redskins ===
Week 7: Phoenix Cardinals at Washington Redskins – Game summary

Quarter	1	2	3	4	Total
Cardinals	7	3	0	7	17
Redskins	9	14	7	3	33

at Robert F. Kennedy Memorial Stadium, Washington, District of Columbia

- Date: October 16
- Game time: 1:00 p.m. EST/11:00 a.m. MST
- Game weather: 61 °F (16 °C)
- Game attendance: 54,402
- Box Score

Game information

First quarter

- PHO – Roy Green 23-yard pass from Neil Lomax (Al Del Greco kick). Cardinals 7–0.
- WAS – Team Safety. Cardinals 7–2.
- WAS – Art Monk 19-yard pass from Mark Rypien (Chip Lohmiller kick). Redskins 9–7.

Second quarter

- PHO – Al Del Greco 38-yard field goal. Cardinals 10–9.
- WAS – Gary Clark 19-yard pass from Mark Rypien (Chip Lohmiller kick). Redskins 16–10.
- WAS – Art Monk 46-yard pass from Mark Rypien (Chip Lohmiller kick). Redskins 23–10.

Third quarter

- WAS – Gary Clark 60-yard pass from Mark Rypien (Chip Lohmiller kick). Redskins 30–10.

Fourth quarter

- WAS – Chip Lohmiller 20-yard field goal. Redskins 33–10.
- PHO – Jay Novacek 41-yard pass from Neil Lomax (Al Del Greco kick). Redskins 33–17.

Top passers

- PHO – Neil Lomax – 26/44, 332 yards, 2 TD, INT
- WAS – Mark Rypien – 15/27, 303 yards, 4 TD, INT

Top rushers

- PHO – Earl Ferrell – 9 rushes, 47 yards
- WAS – Kelvin Bryant – 22 rushes, 73 yards

Top receivers

- PHO – Roy Green – 5 receptions, 85 yards, TD
- WAS – Art Monk – 4 receptions, 82 yards, 2 TD

=== Week 8: vs. Cleveland Browns ===
Week 8: Cleveland Browns at Phoenix Cardinals – Game summary

Quarter	1	2	3	4	Total
Browns	7	10	3	9	29
Cardinals	0	14	0	7	21

at Sun Devil Stadium, Tempe, Arizona

- Date: October 23
- Game time: 2:00 p.m. MST
- Game weather: 80 °F (27 °C)
- Game attendance: 61,261
- Box Score

Game information

First quarter

- CLE – Rickey Bolden 3-yard pass from Bernie Kosar (Matt Bahr kick). Browns 7–0.

Second quarter

- CLE – Reggie Langhorne 29-yard pass from Bernie Kosar (Matt Bahr kick). Browns 14–0.
- PHO - Earl Ferrell 2-yard run (Al Del Greco kick). Browns 14–7
- PHO – J. T. Smith 8-yard pass from Neil Lomax (Al Del Greco kick). Tied 14–14.
- CLE – Matt Bahr 46-yard field goal. Browns 17–14.

Third quarter

- CLE – Matt Bahr 23-yard field goal. Browns 20–14.

Fourth quarter

- PHO – Robert Awalt 21-yard pass from Cliff Stoudt (Al Del Greco kick). Cardinals 21–20.
- CLE – Reggie Langhorne 25-yard pass from Bernie Kosar (Matt Bahr kick). Browns 27–21.
- CLE – Team safety. Browns 29-21.

Top passers

- CLE – Bernie Kosar – 25/43, 314 yards, 3 TD, 3 INT
- PHO – Neil Lomax – 11/19, 120 yards, TD, INT

Top rushers

- CLE – Tim Manoa – 15 rushes, 65 yards
- PHO – Earl Ferrell – 18 rushes, 110 yards, TD

Top receivers

- CLE – Reggie Langhorne – 5 receptions, 89 yards, 2 TD
- PHO – Roy Green – 5 receptions, 69 yards

=== Week 9: at Dallas Cowboys ===
Week 9: Phoenix Cardinals at Dallas Cowboys – Game summary

Quarter	1	2	3	4	Total
Cardinals	0	0	3	13	16
Cowboys	0	0	10	0	10

at Texas Stadium, Irving, Texas

- Date: October 30
- Game time: 12:00 p.m. CST/11:00 a.m. MST
- Game weather: 57 °F (14 °C)
- Game attendance: 42,196
- Box Score

Game information

First quarter

- No scoring plays.

Second quarter

- No scoring plays.

Third quarter

- DAL – Roger Ruzek 39-yard field goal. Cowboys 3–0.
- DAL – Ray Alexander 50-yard pass from Steve Pelluer (Roger Ruzek kick). Cowboys 10–0.
- PHO – Al Del Greco 32-yard field goal. Cowboys 10–3.

Fourth quarter

- PHO – Earl Ferrell 14-yard pass from Neil Lomax (Al Del Greco kick). Tied 10–10.
- PHO – Earl Ferrell 1-yard run (kick failed). Cardinals 16–10.

Top passers

- PHO – Neil Lomax – 13/32, 175 yards, TD
- DAL – Steve Pelluer – 9/31, 132 yards, TD, 2 INT

Top rushers

- PHO – Earl Ferrell – 19 rushes, 110 yards, TD
- DAL – Herschel Walker – 17 rushes, 87 yards

Top receivers

- PHO – Earl Ferrell – 4 receptions, 51 yards, TD
- DAL – Ray Alexander – 5 receptions, 90 yards, TD

=== Week 10: vs. San Francisco 49ers ===
Week 10: San Francisco 49ers at Phoenix Cardinals – Game summary

Quarter	1	2	3	4	Total
49ers	3	13	7	0	23
Cardinals	0	0	7	17	24

at Sun Devil Stadium, Tempe, Arizona

- Date: November 6
- Game time: 2:00 p.m. MST
- Game weather: 75 °F (24 °C)
- Game attendance: 64,544
- Box Score

Game information

First quarter

- SF – Mike Cofer 42-yard field goal. 49ers 3–0.

Second quarter

- SF – Roger Craig 3-yard run (Mike Cofer kick). 49ers 10–0.
- SF – Mike Cofer 27-yard field goal. 49ers 13–0.
- SF – Mike Cofer 30-yard field goal. 49ers 16–0.

Third quarter

- SF – Brent Jones 3-yard pass from Steve Young (Mike Cofer kick). 49ers 23–0.
- PHO – Roy Green 35-yard pass from Neil Lomax (Al Del Greco kick). 49ers 23–7.

Fourth quarter

- PHO – Al Del Greco 24-yard field goal. 49ers 23–10.
- PHO – Ernie Jones 5-yard pass from Neil Lomax (Al Del Greco kick). 49ers 23–17.
- PHO – Roy Green 9-yard pass from Neil Lomax (Al Del Greco kick). Cardinals 24–23.

Top passers

- SF – Steve Young – 14/27, 145 yards, TD
- PHO – Neil Lomax – 25/41, 323 yards, 3 TD

Top rushers

- SF – Roger Craig – 26 rushes, 162 yards, TD
- PHO – Earl Ferrell – 12 rushes, 54 yards

Top receivers

- SF – Tom Rathman – 4 receptions, 45 yards
- PHO – Roy Green – 6 receptions, 93 yards, 2 TD

=== Week 11: vs. New York Giants ===
Week 11: New York Giants at Phoenix Cardinals – Game summary

Quarter	1	2	3	4	Total
Giants	0	7	0	10	17
Cardinals	14	0	0	10	24

at Sun Devil Stadium, Tempe, Arizona

- Date: November 13
- Game time: 2:00 p.m. MST
- Game weather: 68 °F (20 °C)
- Game attendance: 65,324
- Box Score

Game information

First quarter

- PHO – Neil Lomax 1-yard run (Al Del Greco kick). Cardinals 7–0.
- PHO – Robert Awalt 7-yard pass from Neil Lomax (Al Del Greco kick). Cardinals 14–0.

Second quarter

- NYG – Maurice Carthon 18-yard pass from Phil Simms (Paul McFadden kick). Cardinals 14–7.

Third quarter

- No scoring plays

Fourth quarter

- PHO – Roy Green 44-yard pass from Neil Lomax (Al Del Greco kick). Cardinals 21–7.
- NYG – Ottis Anderson 1-yard run (Paul McFadden kick). Cardinals 21–14.
- PHO – Al Del Greco 28-yard field goal. Cardinals 24–14.
- NYG – Paul McFadden 40-yard field goal. Cardinals 24–17.

Top passers

- NYG – Phil Simms – 20/45, 195 yards, TD
- PHO – Neil Lomax – 23/35, 353 yards, 2 TD, INT

Top rushers

- NYG – Joe Morris – 9 rushes, 59 yards
- PHO – Stump Mitchell – 18 rushes, 71 yards

Top receivers

- NYG – George Adams – 7 receptions, 47 yards
- PHO – Roy Green – 9 receptions, 176 yards, TD

=== Week 12: at Houston Oilers ===
Week 12: Phoenix Cardinals at Houston Oilers – Game summary

Quarter	1	2	3	4	Total
Cardinals	0	7	7	6	20
Oilers	7	17	7	7	38

at Houston Astrodome, Houston, Texas

- Date: November 20
- Game time: 12:00 p.m. CST/11:00 a.m. MST
- Game weather: None (Indoor stadium)
- Game attendance: 43,843
- TV: CBS
- Box Score

Game information

First quarter

- HOU – Alonzo Highsmith 7-yard run (Tony Zendejas kick). Oilers 7–0.

Second quarter

- HOU – Tony Zendejas 37-yard field goal. Oilers 10–0.
- HOU – Drew Hill 50-yard pass from Warren Moon (Tony Zendejas kick). Oilers 17–0.
- PHO – Robert Awalt 52-yard pass from Cliff Stoudt (Al Del Greco kick). Oilers 17–7.
- HOU – Warren Moon 1-yard run (Tony Zendejas kick). Oilers 24–7.

Third quarter

- PHO – J. T. Smith 4-yard pass from Cliff Stoudt (Al Del Greco kick). Oilers 24–14.
- HOU – Ernest Givens 30-yard pass from Warren Moon (Tony Zendejas kick). Oilers 31–14.

Fourth quarter

- HOU – Ernest Givens 13-yard pass from Warren Moon (Tony Zendejas kick). Oilers 38–14.
- PHO – Ernie Jones 14-yard pass from Cliff Stoudt (kick failed). Oilers 38–20.

Top passers

- PHO – Cliff Stoudt – 19/29, 249 yards, 3 TD, 2 INT
- HOU – Warren Moon – 17/31, 266 yards, 3 TD

Top rushers

- PHO – Stump Mitchell – 5 rushes, 34 yards
- HOU – Alonzo Highsmith – 10 rushes, 38 yards, TD

Top receivers

- PHO – J. T. Smith – 10 receptions, 114 yards, TD
- HOU – Ernest Givens – 5 receptions, 118 yards, 2 TD

=== Week 13: at Philadelphia Eagles ===
Week 13: Phoenix Cardinals at Philadelphia Eagles – Game summary

Quarter	1	2	3	4	Total
Cardinals	7	7	0	7	21
Eagles	7	0	17	7	31

at Veterans Stadium, Philadelphia, Pennsylvania

- Date: November 27
- Game time: 1:00 p.m. EST/11:00 a.m. MST
- Game weather: 55 °F (13 °C)
- Game attendance: 57,918
- Box Score

Game information

First quarter

- PHI – Ron Johnson 11-yard pass from Randall Cunningham (Luis Zendejas kick). Eagles 7–0.
- PHO – J. T. Smith 7-yard pass from Cliff Stoudt (Al Del Greco kick). Tied 7–7.

Second quarter

- PHO – Earl Ferrell 17-yard run (Al Del Greco kick). Cardinals 14–7

Third quarter

- PHI – Luis Zendejas 28-yard field goal. Cardinals 14–10.'
- PHI – Cris Carter 8-yard pass from Randall Cunningham (Luis Zendejas kick). Eagles 17–14.
- PHI – Ron Johnson 9-yard pass from Matt Cavanaugh (Luis Zendejas kick). Eagles 24–14.

Fourth quarter

- PHO – Earl Ferrell 1-yard run (Al Del Greco kick). Eagles 24–21.
- PHI – Keith Byars 4-yard run (Luis Zendejas kick). Eagles 31–21.

Top passers

- PHO – Cliff Stoudt – 24/43, 228 yards, TD, 4 INT
- PHI – Randall Cunningham – 17/35, 214 yards, 2 TD, 2 INT

Top rushers

- PHO – Earl Ferrell – 18 rushes, 94 yards, 2 TD
- PHI – Keith Byars – 9 rushes, 42 yards, TD

Top receivers

- PHO – J. T. Smith – 9 receptions, 90 yards, TD
- PHI – Cris Carter – 3 receptions, 76 yards, TD

=== Week 14: at New York Giants ===
Week 14: Phoenix Cardinals at New York Giants – Game summary

Quarter	1	2	3	4	Total
Cardinals	0	7	0	0	7
Giants	10	7	7	20	44

at Giants Stadium, East Rutherford, New Jersey

- Date: December 4
- Game time: 1:00 p.m. EST/11:00 a.m. MST
- Game weather: 42 °F (6 °C)
- Game attendance: 73,438
- Box Score

Game information

First quarter

- NYG – Paul McFadden 21-yard field goal. Giants 3–0.
- NYG – Stacy Robinson 14-yard pass from Phil Simms (Paul McFadden kick). Giants 10–0.

Second quarter

- NYG – Stacy Robinson 9-yard pass from Phil Simms (Paul McFadden kick). Giants 17–0.
- PHO – Earl Ferrell 4-yard run (Al Del Greco kick). Giants 17–7

Third quarter

- NYG – Ottis Anderson 1-yard run (Paul McFadden kick). Giants 24–7.

Fourth quarter

- NYG – Ottis Anderson 1-yard run (Paul McFadden kick). Giants 31–7.
- NYG – Joe Morris 4-yard run (Paul McFadden kick). Giants 38–7.
- NYG – Ottis Anderson 1-yard run (kick failed). Giants 44–7.

Top passers

- PHO – Neil Lomax – 9/25, 103 yards, 2 INT
- NYG – Phil Simms – 11/20, 149 yards, 2 TD

Top rushers

- PHO – Stump Mitchell – 8 rushes, 45 yards
- NYG – Joe Morris – 32 rushes, 122 yards, TD

Top receivers

- PHO – Ernie Jones – 1 reception, 45 yards
- NYG – Stacy Robinson – 3 receptions, 48 yards, 2 TD

=== Week 15: vs. Philadelphia Eagles ===
Week 15: Philadelphia Eagles at Phoenix Cardinals – Game summary

Quarter	1	2	3	4	Total
Eagles	21	0	0	2	23
Cardinals	0	7	7	3	17

at Sun Devil Stadium, Tempe, Arizona

- Date: December 10
- Game time: 2:00 p.m. MST
- Game weather: 58 °F (14 °C)
- Game attendance: 54,832
- Box Score

Game information

First quarter

- PHI – Randall Cunningham 15-yard run (Luis Zendejas kick). Eagles 7–0.
- PHI – Keith Byars 4-yard run (Luis Zendejas kick). Eagles 14–0.
- PHI – Cris Carter 37-yard pass from Randall Cunningham (Luis Zendejas kick). Eagles 21–0.

Second quarter

- PHO – Ernie Jones 93-yard pass from Neil Lomax (Al Del Greco kick). Eagles 21–7.

Third quarter

- PHO – E.J. Junior 36-yard fumble return (Al Del Greco kick). Eagles 21–14

Fourth quarter

- PHO – Al Del Greco 40-yard field goal. Eagles 21–17.
- PHI – Team safety. Eagles 23–17.

Top passers

- PHI – Randall Cunningham – 10/26, 169 yards, TD, INT
- PHO – Neil Lomax – 29/50, 384 yards, TD, INT

Top rushers

- PHI – Keith Byars – 12 rushes, 86 yards, TD
- PHO – Stump Mitchell – 11 rushes, 24 yards

Top receivers

- PHI – Keith Byars – 5 receptions, 54 yards
- PHO – Ernie Jones – 6 receptions, 166 yards, TD

=== Week 16: vs. Green Bay Packers ===
Week 16: Green Bay Packers at Phoenix Cardinals – Game summary

Quarter	1	2	3	4	Total
Packers	13	7	6	0	26
Cardinals	7	10	0	0	17

at Sun Devil Stadium, Tempe, Arizona

- Date: December 18
- Game time: 2:00 p.m. MST
- Game weather: 60 °F (16 °C)
- Game attendance: 44,586
- Box Score

Game information

First quarter

- GB – Ron Pitts 63-yard punt return (kick failed). Packers 6–0.
- GB – Keith Woodside 3-yard run (Curtis Burrow kick). Packers 13–0.
- PHO – Stump Mitchell 4-yard run (Al Del Greco kick). Packers 13–7.

Second quarter

- PHO – Al Del Greco 20-yard field goal. Packers 13–10.
- PHO – Stump Mitchell 12-yard run (Al Del Greco kick). Cardinals 17–13.
- GB – Larry Mason 10-yard pass from Don Majkowski (Curtis Burrow kick). Packers 20–17

Third quarter

- GB – Clint Didier 2-yard pass from Don Majkowski (kick failed). Packers 26–17

Fourth quarter

- No scoring plays

Top passers

- GB – Don Majkowski – 18/36, 255 yards, 2 TD, 2 INT
- PHO – Neil Lomax – 15/33, 172 yards

Top rushers

- GB – Larry Mason – 18 rushes, 57 yards
- PHO – Stump Mitchell – 12 rushes, 75 yards, 2 TD

Top receivers

- GB – Perry Kemp – 6 receptions, 58 yards
- PHO – Roy Green – 5 receptions, 75 yards
