= Manny Hendrix =

American football player (born 1964)

No. 45
- Position: Cornerback

Personal information
- Born: October 20, 1964 (age 62); Phoenix, Arizona, U.S.
- Listed height: 5 ft 10 in (1.78 m)
- Listed weight: 170 lb (77 kg)

Career information
- High school: South Mountain (Phoenix)
- College: Utah
- NFL draft: 1986: undrafted

Career history
- Dallas Cowboys (1986–1991); San Francisco 49ers (1992)*; Buffalo Bills (1992)*
- * Offseason or practice squad member only

Awards and highlights
- Basketball second-team All-WAC (1985)

Career NFL statistics
- Interceptions: 2
- Fumble recoveries: 4
- Sacks: 0.5
- Stats at Pro Football Reference

Manuel Hendrix (born October 20, 1964) is an American former professional football player who was a cornerback for the Dallas Cowboys of the National Football League (NFL). He played college basketball for the Utah Utes.

== Early life ==
Hendrix attended South Mountain High School where he received All-American and All-state honors at cornerback in football. He received All-state honors at guard in basketball. He also practiced track.

He accepted a scholarship from the University of Utah, which was the only school that recruited him to play basketball. He became a four-year starter and a two-time captain under the coaching of Lynn Archibald,

Hendrix helped the Utes to the NCAA tournament in 1983 where they eliminated UCLA reaching the Sweet 16, and again in 1986 where they lost to North Carolina in the First round.

During his senior year, he was named team MVP and second-team All-WAC. He hit game-winning shots in back-to-back games during the 1985 WAC tournament, specially the one against Wyoming University. He finished his career ranked eighth in scoring with 1,493 points and fifth in assists with 409 in school history.

Hendrix possessed elite speed and put it on display during halftime of the intrasquad spring game in 1986, when tired of the taunts from football player Del Rodgers (a 1982 third-round draft pick), accepted his challenge to a 30-yard run and beat him barefoot. They would then run a 40-yard race where he won running the last 5 yards backwards.

In 2005, he was inducted into the Crimson Club Hall of Fame. In 2006, he was inducted into the Utah Sports Hall of Fame.

== Professional career ==
=== Dallas Cowboys ===
Although he never played a down of college football, he signed with the Dallas Cowboys as an undrafted free agent in 1986, following on the foot steps of Cornell Green, Peter Gent, Percy Howard, Ken Johnson and Ron Howard, as basketball players that were converted by the Cowboys to play professional football. On August 26, he was released and later re-signed on September 23. As a rookie he played on the nickel defense on passing downs, tallying 13 tackles and one fumble recovery.

In 1987, he registered 22 tackles and one pass defensed. He also started his first career game in the season finale against the St. Louis Cardinals, replacing an injured Ron Francis, while making 11 tackles and one pass defensed.

In 1988, he collected 31 tackles, one interception and 6 passes defensed. In 1989, he registered 3 starts, 27 tackles, 0.5 sacks, 6 quarterback pressures, 17 passes defensed and one fumble recovery.

In 1990, he became a starter, with 10 of his 11 starts coming at right cornerback after passing Robert Williams on the depth chart. He finished with 65 tackles, one interception, 6 passes defensed, one quarterback pressure and one forced fumble.

The next year, he lost his starting job to rookie Larry Brown after the third game. At the end of the 1991 season, he was left unprotected in Plan B free agency.

=== San Francisco 49ers ===
On April 2, 1992, he was signed in Plan B free agency by the San Francisco 49ers, but was cut in July.

=== Buffalo Bills ===
On July 31, 1992, he signed as a free agent with the Buffalo Bills. He was released on August 31.

== Personal life ==
Hendrix worked as the director of athletic relations and senior associate athletics director for development at the University of Utah. He also owned Manny's Auto Detailing and was a manager and part owner of Matthews Restaurant in Dallas.

His son Manny Hendrix Jr., plays semi-professional basketball in Australia's Big V basketball league.
