= Rob Awalt =

American football player (born 1964)

No. 80, 89, 86
- Position: Tight end

Personal information
- Born: April 9, 1964 (age 62); Landstuhl, West Germany
- Listed height: 6 ft 5 in (1.96 m)
- Listed weight: 258 lb (117 kg)

Career information
- High school: Valley (Sacramento, California, U.S.)
- College: Nevada; San Diego State
- NFL draft: 1987: 3rd round, 62nd overall pick

Career history
- St. Louis/Phoenix Cardinals (1987–1989); Dallas Cowboys (1990–1991); Denver Broncos (1992)*; Buffalo Bills (1992–1993)
- * Offseason or practice squad member only

Awards and highlights
- UPI NFL-NFC Rookie of the Year (1987); PFWA All-Rookie Team (1987); Third-team All-American (1986); All-WAC (1986)

Career NFL statistics
- Receptions: 138
- Receiving yards: 1,583
- Touchdowns: 10
- Stats at Pro Football Reference

Robert Mitchell Awalt (/ˈeɪwɔːlt/ AY-wawlt; born April 9, 1964) is a German-American former professional football tight end in the National Football League (NFL) for the St. Louis/Phoenix Cardinals, Dallas Cowboys, and Buffalo Bills. He played college football at San Diego State University.

== Early life ==
Born in Landstuhl, West Germany, he attended Valley High School in Sacramento, California, where he played as a quarterback. A coach failed him in physical education, preventing him from playing football one season.

Awalt accepted a football scholarship from the University of Nevada and spent one season as a redshirt quarterback. As a sophomore, he transferred to Sacramento City College and was converted to a tight end.

As a junior, he transferred to San Diego State University, where he posted 15 receptions for 181 yards and 2 touchdowns. That season, he was affected with thoracic outlet syndrome; the neurovascular problem was corrected by removing a rib and rerouting an artery and nerve.

In his last year, he led the team with 45 receptions (tenth in the conference) for 541 yards and 2 touchdowns.

== Professional career ==
Pre-draft measurables
| Height | Weight | Arm length | Hand span | 40-yard dash | 10-yard split | 20-yard split | 20-yard shuttle | Vertical jump | Broad jump |
|---|---|---|---|---|---|---|---|---|---|
| 6 ft 5 in (1.96 m) | 239 lb (108 kg) | 30 3/4 in (0.78 m) | 9 1/2 in (0.24 m) | 4.86 s | 1.68 s | 2.77 s | 4.45 s | 28.0 in (0.71 m) | 9 ft 0 in (2.74 m) |
All values from NFL Combine

=== St. Louis / Phoenix Cardinals ===
Awalt was selected by the St. Louis Cardinals in the third round (62nd overall) of the 1987 NFL draft. Although he entered his rookie season as a backup, starter Jay Novacek suffered a fractured right elbow which allowed him to be promoted mid-way through the season. He would end up having a year to remember, registering 9 receptions in each of the first two games after replacing Novacek and tying a franchise single-game record held by Jackie Smith. He finished with 42 receptions which was good for second among NFC tight ends and fell one short of the franchise record for receptions in a season for a rookie (Gern Nagler). He also had 9 starts, 526 receiving yards (second on the team) and 6 receiving touchdowns receptions (tying the franchise record for rookies). He was voted rookie of the year by the UPI and Sporting News.

In 1988, he passed Novacek on the depth chart and became the starter at tight end (15 starts). Although he tore two ligaments in his left ankle during October, he didn't miss any games. He finished third on the team with 39 receptions for 454 and 4 receiving touchdowns.

In 1989, with Gary Hogeboom instead of Neil Lomax as the team's starting quarterback, his production fell to 33 receptions for 360 yards and no touchdowns.

In 1990, Joe Bugel was hired as the new head coach and after Awalt missed three preseason games with a hyperextended right knee, he was surprisingly traded to the Dallas Cowboys in exchange for an eighth round pick (#209-Scott Evans) on August 29.

=== Dallas Cowboys ===
In 1990, the Dallas Cowboys acquired Awalt looking for him to recover his previous form and compete with Novacek (who was acquired in Plan B free agency) for the starting tight end job. He would end up having only 13 receptions for 133 yards, falling behind Novacek and missing the last 3 games because of a back injury. The next year, his production fell to 5 receptions for 57 yards, but he was still being used in two-tight end sets.

=== Denver Broncos ===
On April 1, 1992, he signed in Plan B free agency with the Denver Broncos. He was waived on August 31, after falling behind in training camp to Clarence Kay, Reggie Johnson and Shannon Sharpe.

=== Buffalo Bills ===
On September 8, 1992, he was signed as a free agent by the Buffalo Bills to replace an injured Keith McKeller. He was mainly used on special teams and faced the Cowboys in Super Bowl XXVIII. On December 30, 1993, he was placed on the injured reserve list with a rotator cuff injury.
