= Robert Williams (defensive back, born 1962) =

American football player (born 1962)

No. 23, 40
- Positions: Cornerback, safety

Personal information
- Born: October 2, 1962 (age 64); Galveston, Texas, U.S.
- Listed height: 5 ft 10 in (1.78 m)
- Listed weight: 190 lb (86 kg)

Career information
- High school: Ball (Galveston)
- College: Baylor
- NFL draft: 1986: undrafted

Career history
- Washington Redskins (1986)*; Dallas Cowboys (1987–1992); Phoenix Cardinals (1992); Dallas Cowboys (1992–1993); Washington Redskins (1993); Kansas City Chiefs (1993); Washington Redskins (1994)*
- * Offseason or practice squad member only

Awards and highlights
- 2× Super Bowl champion (XXVII, XXVIII)

Career NFL statistics
- Interceptions: 4
- Fumble recoveries: 2
- Sacks: 1
- Stats at Pro Football Reference

Robert Cole Williams (born October 2, 1962) is an American former professional football player who was a cornerback in the National Football League (NFL) for the Dallas Cowboys, Washington Redskins and Kansas City Chiefs. He played college football for the Baylor Bears.

== Early life ==
Williams attended Ball High School, where he played at running back. He was also a long jumper, ran on all relay teams, and was a standout hurdler. He won the district high hurdles title as a senior.

He accepted a football scholarship from Baylor University, to play under head coach Grant Teaff. He redshirted his freshman year. He was a backup running back behind Walter Abercrombie and Alfred Anderson in his first two seasons.

As a junior, he was a backup behind Ron Francis and Ralph Stockemer. He had 23 carries for 65 yards.

As a senior, he was a backup behind Derrick McAdoo, tallying 58 carries for 208 yards and 14 receptions for 183 yards, while being used as a wide receiver in some passing situations. He finished his college career with 119 carries for 410 yards, 19 receptions for 210 yards and one touchdown.

== Professional career ==
=== Washington Redskins (first stint) ===
Williams was signed as an undrafted free agent by the Washington Redskins after the 1986 NFL draft on May 3, with the intention of converting him into a wide receiver. He played in just two pre-season games before he was waived on August 4.

=== Dallas Cowboys (first stint) ===
The Dallas Cowboys were intrigued by his combination of size and speed, and signed him as a free agent prior to the 1987 season. Head coach Tom Landry planned to turn Williams into a defensive back to take advantage of his speed. He was released on September 7.

After the players went on a strike on the third week of the season, those contests were canceled (reducing the 16 game season to 15) and the NFL decided that the games would be played with replacement players. In September, he was re-signed to be a part of the Cowboys replacement team, which was given the mock name "Rhinestone Cowboys" by the media. He started two games at right cornerback and one at left cornerback, playing well enough that the Cowboys kept him for the rest of the season. He was mainly used as a special teams player, also seeing time at linebacker on passing situations. He finished with 26 tackles, one pass defensed and one fumble recovery.

In 1988, former Baylor teammate Ron Francis entered the season as the starter at right cornerback, before dislocating his left shoulder during an intrasquad game in pre-season. The injury allowed Williams to win the position outright. He recorded 60 tackles, 2 interceptions (tied for the team lead) and 19 passes defensed (second on the team). In the fifteenth game, a 24-17 win against the Washington Redskins, he had 4 passes defensed and set up the winning touchdown with an interception at the Redskins 24 yard line. In the ninth game against the Phoenix Cardinals, he limited Roy Green to one reception for 7 yards and also had 3 passes defensed.

In 1989, he missed 3 games with a sprained left knee he suffered in the third game against the Washington Redskins. In the last 2 games he was benched in favor of Francis. He posted 70 tackles, 10 passes defensed (tied for the team lead) and one quarterback pressure. In the season opener against the New Orleans Saints he tied a career-high with 10 tackles. In eighth game against the Phoenix Cardinals he had 4 passes defensed. The next game against the Washington Redskins he had 3 passes defensed.

In 1990, he started the first 6 games at right cornerback, before being passed on the depth chart by Manny Hendrix. He played as a nickel back the rest of the season. Here registered 42 tackles, 6 passes defensed, 3 special teams tackles, one interception.

In 1991, he was a backup cornerback, starting 2 games at weakside linebacker against the Houston Oilers and Atlanta Falcons, who were employing run and shoot offenses at the time. He tallied 49 tackles, 9 special teams tackles, one interception, 4 passes defensed, one sack and 2 quarterback pressures. In the ninth game against the Phoenix Cardinals he had a block punt to set up a touchdown. In the tenth game against the Houston Oilers he had 10 tackles and returned a blocked punt for his first career touchdown.

In 1992, he was moved from cornerback to free safety during the offseason. In the second game against the New York Giants he returned a blocked punt for a 3-yard touchdown. On September 21, he was placed on the injured reserve list because of a left knee injury. On October 26, he was signed to the practice squad. He was released 3 days later on October 29.

=== Phoenix Cardinals ===
On October 30, 1992, he was claimed off waivers by the Phoenix Cardinals. He was released two days later due to a failed a physical examination on November 1.

=== Dallas Cowboys (second stint) ===
On November 3, 1992, he was reacquired by the Cowboys. He was one of two players declared inactive for Super Bowl XXVII (the other was Alan Veingrad). He appeared in 9 games, collecting 7 tackles and one quarterback pressure.

On August 30, 1993, he was released and re-signed one day later. On October 12, 1993, he was released after playing in 4 games. Williams won two Super Bowl rings as a member of the Cowboys.

=== Washington Redskins (second stint) ===
On October 20, 1993, he signed with the Washington Redskins. He was declared inactive for the Monday game against the Buffalo Bills. He was released on November 2.

=== Kansas City Chiefs ===
On December 30, 1993, Williams signed as a free agent with the Kansas City Chiefs. He was cut on March 29, 1994.

=== Washington Redskins (third stint) ===
In August, 1994, he signed with the Washington Redskins. He was waived after playing in two pre-season games on August 28. He would later announce his retirement.

== Personal life ==
In 1996, Williams was hired as an assistant football and track coach at Jesuit College Preparatory School of Dallas. He goes by the nickname of “Doogie”.
