= Danta Whitaker =

American football player (1964–2020)

No. 82, 85, 88
- Position: Tight end

Personal information
- Born: March 14, 1964; Atlanta, Georgia, U.S.
- Died: March 23, 2020 (aged 56)
- Listed height: 6 ft 4 in (1.93 m)
- Listed weight: 252 lb (114 kg)

Career information
- High school: Atlanta (GA) George
- College: Mississippi Valley State
- NFL draft: 1988: 7th round, 186th overall pick

Career history
- New York Giants (1988); Atlanta Falcons (1989)*; Kansas City Chiefs (1989–1990); San Antonio Riders (1992); Minnesota Vikings (1992); Miami Dolphins (1993)*; Chicago Bears (1993)
- * Offseason or practice squad member only

Career NFL statistics
- Receptions: 9
- Receiving yards: 74
- Touchdowns: 1
- Stats at Pro Football Reference

Danta Whitaker (March 14, 1964 – March 23, 2020) was an American professional football tight end. The New York Giants selected him in the seventh round of the 1988 NFL draft with the 186th overall pick. He played college football at Mississippi Valley State.

Whitaker also played for the Kansas City Chiefs, San Antonio Riders, Minnesota Vikings and Chicago Bears. He died on March 23, 2020, at the age of 56.
