= 1988 Philadelphia Eagles season =

NFL team season

- Owner: Norman Braman
- Head coach: Buddy Ryan
- Offensive coordinator: Ted Plumb
- Defensive coordinator: Wade Phillips
- Home stadium: Veterans Stadium

Results
- Record: 10–6
- Division place: 1st NFC East
- Playoffs: Lost Divisional Playoffs (at Bears) 12–20

Uniform
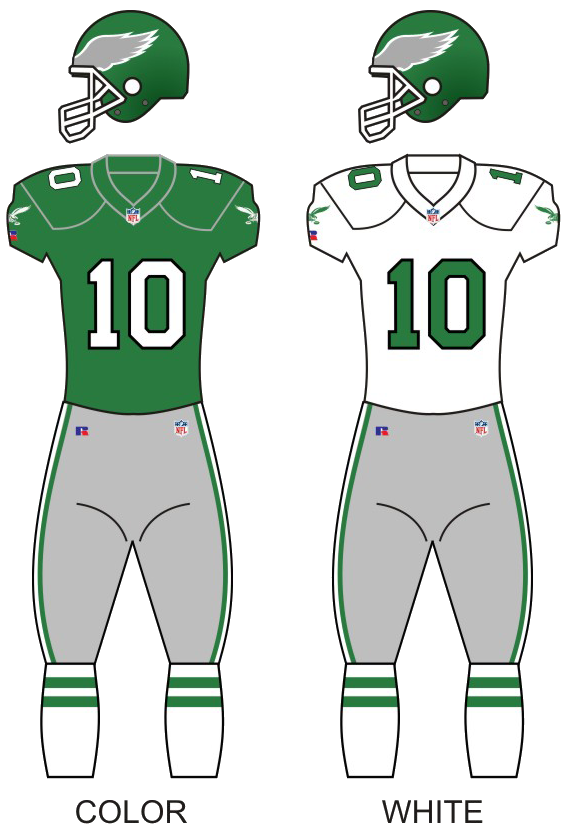

The 1988 Philadelphia Eagles season was the franchise's fifty-sixth season in the National Football League (NFL).

== Background ==
This season resulted in the team's appearance in the postseason for the first time since 1981. The Eagles won the NFC East for the first time since 1980, but lost to the Chicago Bears during the NFC Divisional round during the Fog Bowl.

In control of its own destiny for a playoff berth, but not the NFC East title on the final day of the regular season, Philadelphia dumped the Dallas Cowboys, 23–7. Guaranteed a minimum of a wild card berth following a New Orleans Saints win, the team had to wait for the end to the New York Jets-New York Giants game at Giants Stadium to learn if had clinched the division or not to avoid the Wild Card round. The Jets won the game, 27–21, on a late touchdown strike from Ken O'Brien to Al Toon, giving the Eagles the NFC East crown on the tiebreaker of having beaten the Giants in both regular-season meetings.

== Offseason ==
=== NFL draft ===
1988 Philadelphia Eagles Draft
Round	Selection	Player	Position	College
1	9	Keith Jackson	TE	Oklahoma
2	30	Eric Allen	CB	Arizona State
3	64	Matt Patchan	T	Miami (Florida)
5	122	Eric Everett	DB	Texas Tech
6	149	Don McPherson	QB	Syracuse
6	160	Rob Sterling	CB	Maine
7	176	Todd White	WR	Cal State Fullerton
8	207	David Smith	RB	Western Kentucky
10	261	Joe Schuster	DT	Iowa
11	288	Izel Jenkins	CB	North Carolina State
12	288	Steve Kaufusi	DE	BYU

== Personnel ==
=== Staff / Coaches ===
1988 Philadelphia Eagles staff
Front office: Owner – Norman Braman; President and chief operating officer – Harry Gamble; Director of player personnel – Joe Woolley; Head coaches: Head coach – Buddy Ryan; Offensive coaches: Assistant head coach/offense – Ted Plumb; Quarterbacks – Doug Scovil; Offensive backs – Dave Atkins; Offensive line – Bill Walsh; Assistant offensive line – Dan Neal	Defensive coaches: Defensive coordinator/linebackers – Wade Phillips; Defensive line – Dale Haupt; Defensive backs – Jeff Fisher; Special teams coaches: Special teams – Al Roberts; Strength and conditioning: Strength and conditioning – Ronnie Jones

=== Roster ===
1988 Philadelphia Eagles roster
Quarterbacks (QB): 6 Matt Cavanaugh; 12 Randall Cunningham; 9 Don McPherson; Running backs (RB): 32 Walter Abercrombie; 41 Keith Byars; 26 Michael Haddix; 35 Mark Konecny; 25 Anthony Toney; Wide receivers (WR): 81 Shawn Beals; 80 Cris Carter; 84 Kenny Jackson; 85 Ron Johnson; 82 Mike Quick; Tight ends (TE): 83 Jimmie Giles; 88 Keith Jackson; 89 David Little LS	Offensive linemen (OL): 72 David Alexander G; 63 Ron Baker G; 78 Matt Darwin T; 73 Ron Heller T; 66 Ken Reeves T/G; 50 Dave Rimington C; 68 Reggie Singletary G; 61 Ben Tamburello G; Defensive linemen (DL): 99 Jerome Brown DT; 90 Mike Golic DT; 97 John Klingel DE; 74 Mike Pitts DT; 96 Clyde Simmons DE; 92 Reggie White DE	Linebackers (LB): 58 Ty Allert MLB; 52 Todd Bell OLB; 91 Scott Curtis OLB; 56 Byron Evans MLB; 53 Dwayne Jiles OLB; 59 Seth Joyner OLB; 55 Mike Reichenbach MLB; Defensive backs (DB): 21 Eric Allen CB; 42 Eric Everett CB; 33 William Frizzell SS; 34 Terry Hoage FS; 48 Wes Hopkins FS; 46 Izel Jenkins CB; 20 Andre Waters SS; 43 Roynell Young CB; Special teams (ST): 10 John Teltschik P; 8 Luis Zendejas K	Reserve: 87 Eric Bailey TE (IR); 95 Doug Bartlett DT (IR); 77 Donald Evans DE (IR); 86 Gregg Garrity WR (IR); 94 Steve Kaufusi DE (IR); 57 Ron Moten LB (IR); 98 Joe Schuster DT (IR); 65 Ron Solt G (IR); 47 Rob Sterling S (IR); 47 active, 9 inactive Rookies in italics

== Regular season ==
=== Schedule ===
Week	Date	Opponent	Result	Record	Venue	Recap
1	September 4	at Tampa Bay Buccaneers	**W** 41–14	1–0	Tampa Stadium	Recap
2	September 11	Cincinnati Bengals	**L** 24–28	1–1	Veterans Stadium	Recap
3	September 18	at **Washington Redskins**	**L** 10–17	1–2	Robert F. Kennedy Memorial Stadium	Recap
4	September 25	at Minnesota Vikings	**L** 21–23	1–3	Hubert H. Humphrey Metrodome	Recap
5	October 2	Houston Oilers	**W** 32–23	2–3	Veterans Stadium	Recap
6	October 10	**New York Giants**	**W** 24–13	3–3	Veterans Stadium	Recap
7	October 16	at Cleveland Browns	**L** 3–19	3–4	Cleveland Stadium	Recap
8	October 23	**Dallas Cowboys**	**W** 24–23	4–4	Veterans Stadium	Recap
9	October 30	Atlanta Falcons	**L** 24–27	4–5	Veterans Stadium	Recap
10	November 6	Los Angeles Rams	**W** 30–24	5–5	Veterans Stadium	Recap
11	November 13	at Pittsburgh Steelers	**W** 27–26	6–5	Three Rivers Stadium	Recap
12	November 20	at **New York Giants**	**W** 23–17 (OT)	7–5	Giants Stadium	Recap
13	November 27	**Phoenix Cardinals**	**W** 31–21	8–5	Veterans Stadium	Recap
14	December 4	**Washington Redskins**	**L** 19–20	8–6	Veterans Stadium	Recap
15	December 10	at **Phoenix Cardinals**	**W** 23–17	9–6	Sun Devil Stadium	Recap
16	December 18	at **Dallas Cowboys**	**W** 23–7	10–6	Texas Stadium	Recap

Note: Intra-division opponents are in bold text.

=== Season summary ===
==== Week 1 ====
Team	1	2	3	4	Total
• Eagles	21	13	7	0	41
Buccaneers	0	0	14	0	14

- Date: September 4
- Location: Tampa Stadium
- Game attendance: 43,502
- Referee: Johnny Grier
- TV announcers (CBS): James Brown and Gary Fencik

Scoring summary
Q1	13:30	PHI	Quick 37 yard pass from Cunningham (Dorsey kick)	PHI 7–0
Q1	3:40	PHI	Toney 2 yard run (Dorsey kick)	PHI 14–0
Q1	2:23	PHI	Jackson 8 yard pass from Cunningham (Dorsey kick)	PHI 21–0
Q2	7:10	PHI	Dorsey 23 yard field goal	PHI 24–0
Q2	2:22	PHI	Dorsey 24 yard field goal	PHI 27–0
Q2	0:30	PHI	Cunningham 2 yard run (Dorsey kick)	PHI 34–0
Q3	11:12	TB	Hill 42 yard pass from Testaverde (Igwebuike kick)	PHI 34–7
Q3	6:37	PHI	Hoage 38 yard run (Dorsey kick)	PHI 41–7
Q3	1:32	TB	Carrier 56 yard pass from Testaverde (Igwebuike kick)	PHI 41–14

The Eagles played the Tampa Bay Buccaneers at Tampa Stadium where temperatures reached 90-degrees. On the Eagles’ fourth play of the game, Bucs linebacker Kevin Murphy chased Cunningham out of the pocket, and he rolled to his left and floated a 37-yard TD to Mike Quick. The first quarter ended with the Eagles up 21 to 0 after Anthony Toney ran for a TD and Cunningham threw an 8-yard TD to Jackson. The Eagles even scored on a 38-yard TD run by safety Terry Hoage on the only carry of his 13-year career.

==== Week 2 ====
Team	1	2	3	4	Total
• Bengals	7	7	0	14	28
Eagles	14	0	3	7	24

- Date: September 11
- Location: Veterans Stadium
- Referee: Bob McElwee
- TV announcers (NBC): Kevin Slaten and Dave Lapham

==== Week 3 ====
Team	1	2	3	4	Total
Eagles	0	3	0	7	10
• Redskins	14	0	3	0	17

- Date: September 18
- Location: RFK Stadium
- Referee: Jerry Markbreit
- TV announcers (CBS): Verne Lundquist and Terry Bradshaw

==== Week 4 ====
Team	1	2	3	4	Total
Eagles	0	14	0	7	21
• Vikings	10	0	7	6	23

- Date: September 25
- Location: Hubert H. Humphrey Metrodome
- Game weather: Indoors (dome)
- Referee: Jim Tunney
- TV announcers (CBS): Dick Stockton and Dan Fouts

==== Week 5 ====
Team	1	2	3	4	Total
Oilers	16	0	0	7	23
• Eagles	0	20	9	3	32

- Date: October 2
- Location: Veterans Stadium
- Referee: Dick Jorgensen
- Television network: NBC

==== Week 6 ====
Team	1	2	3	4	Total
Giants	3	0	3	7	13
• Eagles	0	14	3	7	24

- Date: October 10
- Location: Veterans Stadium
- Referee: Fred Wyant
- TV announcers (ABC): Frank Gifford and Dan Dierdorf

==== Week 7 ====
Team	1	2	3	4	Total
Eagles	0	3	0	0	3
• Browns	3	0	6	10	19

- Date: October 16
- Location: Cleveland Stadium
- Referee: Johnny Grier
- TV announcers (CBS): Steve Zabriskie and Will McDonough

==== Week 8 ====
Team	1	2	3	4	Total
Cowboys	17	3	3	0	23
• Eagles	0	7	3	14	24

- Date: October 23
- Location: Veterans Stadium
- Referee: Dick Hantak
- TV announcers (CBS): Verne Lundquist and Dan Jiggetts

==== Week 9 ====
Team	1	2	3	4	Total
• Falcons	0	7	13	7	27
Eagles	3	7	0	14	24

- Date: October 30
- Location: Veterans Stadium
- Referee: Ben Dreith
- TV announcers (CBS): James Brown and Gary Fencik

==== Week 10 ====
Team	1	2	3	4	Total
Rams	3	7	0	14	24
• Eagles	0	10	10	10	30

- Date: November 6
- Location: Veterans Stadium
- Referee: Bob McElwee
- TV announcers (CBS): Dick Stockton and Dan Fouts

==== Week 11 ====
Team	1	2	3	4	Total
• Eagles	0	14	3	10	27
Steelers	10	6	7	3	26

- Date: November 13
- Location: Three Rivers Stadium
- Referee: Fred Wyant
- TV announcers (CBS): Tim Ryan and Dan Jiggetts

==== Week 12 ====
Team	1	2	3	4	OT	Total
• Eagles	7	3	0	7	6	23
Giants	7	3	7	0	0	17

- Date: November 20
- Location: Giants Stadium
- Referee: Tom Dooley
- TV announcers (CBS): Pat Summerall and John Madden

==== Week 13 ====
Team	1	2	3	4	Total
Cardinals	7	7	0	7	21
• Eagles	7	0	17	7	31

- Date: November 27
- Location: Veterans Stadium
- Referee: Gordon McCarter
- TV announcers (CBS): Tim Ryan and Dan Jiggets

==== Week 14 ====
Team	1	2	3	4	Total
• Redskins	7	0	3	10	20
Eagles	3	13	3	0	19

- Date: December 4
- Location: Veterans Stadium
- Referee: Ben Dreith
- TV announcers (CBS): Dick Stockton and Dan Fouts

==== Week 15 ====
Team	1	2	3	4	Total
• Eagles	21	0	0	2	23
Cardinals	0	7	7	3	17

- Date: December 10
- Location: Sun Devil Stadium
- Referee: Pat Haggerty
- TV announcers (CBS): Verne Lundquist and Terry Bradshaw

==== Week 16 ====
Team	1	2	3	4	Total
• Eagles	0	10	7	6	23
Cowboys	7	0	0	0	7

- Date: December 18
- Location: Texas Stadium
- Referee: Jim Tunney
- TV announcers (CBS): Tim Brandt and Hank Stram

=== Standings ===
NFC East
	W	L	T	PCT	DIV	CONF	PF	PA	STK
^{(3)} Philadelphia Eagles	10	6	0	.625	6–2	8–4	379	319	W2
New York Giants	10	6	0	.625	5–3	9–5	359	304	L1
Washington Redskins	7	9	0	.438	4–4	6–6	345	387	L2
Phoenix Cardinals	7	9	0	.438	3–5	6–6	344	398	L5
Dallas Cowboys	3	13	0	.188	2–6	3–9	265	381	L1

== Postseason ==
=== Schedule ===
Round	Date	Opponent (seed)	Result	Record	Venue	Recap
Wild Card	First-round bye					
Divisional	December 31, 1988	at Chicago Bears (1)	L 12–20	0–1	Soldier Field	Recap

=== Game summaries ===
==== NFC Divisional Playoffs: at (1) Chicago Bears ====
NFC Divisional Playoffs: (3) Philadelphia Eagles at (1) Chicago Bears – Game summary

Quarter	1	2	3	4	Total
Eagles	3	6	3	0	12
Bears	7	10	0	3	20

at Soldier Field, Chicago, Illinois

- Date: December 31, 1988
- Game time: 12:30 p.m. EST/11:30 a.m. CST
- Game weather: 25 °F (−4 °C), sunny, then fog in the 2nd half
- Game attendance: 65,534
- Referee: Jim Tunney
- TV announcers (CBS): Verne Lundquist (play-by-play) and Terry Bradshaw (color commentator)

Game information

First quarter

- CHI – Dennis McKinnon 64-yard pass from Mike Tomczak (Kevin Butler kick). Bears 7–0.
- PHI – Luis Zendejas 42-yard field goal. Bears 7–3.
- PHI – Luis Zendejas 29-yard field goal. Bears 7–6.

Second quarter

- CHI – Neal Anderson 4-yard run (Kevin Butler kick). Bears 14–6.
- CHI – Kevin Butler 46-yard field goal. Bears 17–6.
- PHI – Luis Zendejas 30-yard field goal. Bears 17–9.

Third quarter

- PHI – Luis Zendejas 35-yard field goal. Bears 17–12.

Fourth quarter

- CHI – Kevin Butler 27-yard field goal. Bears 20–12.

Top passers

- PHI – Randall Cunningham – 27/54, 407 yards, 3 INT
- CHI – Mike Tomczak – 10/20, 172 yards, TD, 3 INT

Top rushers

- PHI – Keith Byars – 7 rushes, 34 yards
- CHI – Thomas Sanders – 8 rushes, 94 yards

Top receivers

- PHI – Keith Jackson – 7 receptions, 142 yards
- CHI – Dennis McKinnon – 4 receptions, 108 yards, TD

== Awards and honors ==
- NFL All-Rookie: Eric Allen
- Bert Bell Award: Randall Cunningham
- Sporting News Rookie of the Year: Keith Jackson
