= Sammy Lilly =

American football player (born 1965)

No. 37, 38, 26, 27
- Positions: Cornerback, safety

Personal information
- Born: February 12, 1965 (age 61); Anchorage, Alaska, U.S.
- Listed height: 5 ft 9 in (1.75 m)
- Listed weight: 178 lb (81 kg)

Career information
- High school: Augusta (GA) Butler
- College: Georgia Tech
- NFL draft: 1988: 8th round, 202nd overall pick

Career history
- New York Giants (1988); Philadelphia Eagles (1989–1990); San Diego Chargers (1990); Los Angeles Rams (1991); Tampa Bay Buccaneers (1992)*; Pittsburgh Steelers (1992)*; Los Angeles Rams (1992)
- * Offseason or practice squad member only

Career NFL statistics
- Games played: 50
- Games started: 1
- Stats at Pro Football Reference

Samuel Julius Lilly IV (born February 12, 1965) is an American former professional football player who was a defensive back in the National Football League (NFL). He played for the Philadelphia Eagles (1989–1990), the San Diego Chargers (1990), and the Los Angeles Rams (1991–1992). He played college football for the Georgia Tech Yellow Jackets.

== Professional career ==
Lilly was selected in the eighth round with the 202nd overall pick in the 1988 NFL draft by the New York Giants. Lilly suffered a knee injury and was placed on injured reserve.

Following the 1988 season, Lilly became an unrestricted free agent and signed a two-year contract March 13, 1989 with the Philadelphia Eagles.

After being released by the Eagles towards the end of the 1990 season, Lilly was picked up on December 5, 1990, by the San Diego Chargers during their bye week.

Following the 1990 season, Lilly again found himself a free agent and signed a contract with the Los Angeles Rams on April 1, 1991. Lilly was again left as a free agent at the end of the 1991 season.

Lilly signed with the Buccaneers on March 31, 1992. Lilly was hampered in the preseason with a hamstring injury and was released by the Buccaneers August 24, 1992.

Lilly was claimed on waivers August 26, 1992 after being waived by the Buccaneers however he was unable to make the final regular season cut and was waived by the Steelers just 5 days later.

After starting, Rams cornerback Todd Lyght suffered a separated shoulder and was put on injured reserve. Because of this, the Rams brought back Samuel Lilly for depth on September 22, 1992.

Lilly did not play beyond the 1992 season. In 2012, he founded Sports Academy South, a sports training academy. The site became defunct for unknown reasons in 2022 after not having been updated since 2017.
