= Jay Novacek =

American football player (born 1962)

- Novacek in 2010

No. 85, 84
- Position: Tight end

Personal information
- Born: October 24, 1962 (age 64); Martin, South Dakota, U.S.
- Listed height: 6 ft 4 in (1.93 m)
- Listed weight: 234 lb (106 kg)

Career information
- High school: Gothenburg (Gothenburg, Nebraska)
- College: Wyoming (1982–1984)
- NFL draft: 1985: 6th round, 158th overall pick

Career history
- St. Louis / Phoenix Cardinals (1985–1989); Dallas Cowboys (1990–1996)

Awards and highlights
- 3× Super Bowl champion (XXVII, XXVIII, XXX); First-team All-Pro (1992); PFWA All-NFC (1992); Second-team All-Pro (1991); 5× Pro Bowl (1991–1995); Consensus All-American (1984); First-team All-WAC (1984)

Career NFL statistics
- Receptions: 422
- Receiving yards: 4,630
- Receiving touchdowns: 30
- Stats at Pro Football Reference
- College Football Hall of Fame

Jay McKinley Novacek (/ˈnoʊvətʃɛk/ NOH-və-chek; born October 24, 1962) is an American former professional football player who was a tight end in the National Football League (NFL) for the St. Louis / Phoenix Cardinals (1985–1989) and the Dallas Cowboys (1990–1995). He played college football for the Wyoming Cowboys and was selected by the Cardinals in the sixth round of the 1985 NFL draft. Novacek was a five-time Pro Bowler, who was selected to play each year from 1991 through 1995. He was inducted into the College Football Hall of Fame in 2008.

== Early life ==
Born in Martin, South Dakota, Novacek attended Gothenburg High School in central Nebraska, where he was a two-year starter at quarterback and a three-sport athlete.

In 1980, he set the state record in the pole vault at 15 ft 1 in (4.60 m) and also won the state titles in that event and hurdles. He was an All-state football and basketball player. His jersey is the only one retired in school history.

Novacek was inducted into the Nebraska High School Sports Hall of Fame in 1996.

== College career ==
Novacek accepted a scholarship from the University of Wyoming in Laramie and started his college football career as a split end with the Wyoming Cowboys. The next year, he was moved to tight end.

He had few opportunities to prove his true worth in head coach Al Kincaid's run-oriented wishbone offense, where the team usually threw around 18 passes per game.

In 1984, Novacek posted 33 receptions for 745 yards, 4 touchdowns and set an NCAA single-season record for average per reception (22.6 yards) by a tight end. He was a consensus All-American and selected to the Western Athletic Conference (WAC) first-team. He finished his college career with 83 career receptions for 1,536 yards and 10 touchdowns.

Novacek also competed in track and field for the Cowboys. He won the WAC decathlon championship and placed fourth in the NCAA championships, earning All-American honors in track. He set the school record for decathlon points (7,615) and in the pole vault jump (16 ft 4 in (4.98 m)). He competed in the 1984 Olympic trials as a decathlete.

In 2008, he was inducted into the College Football Hall of Fame. In 1993, he was inducted into the inaugural class of the University of Wyoming Athletics Hall of Fame. In 2014, he was inducted into the Texas Cowboy Hall of Fame.

== Professional career ==
=== St. Louis / Phoenix Cardinals ===
Novacek was selected in the sixth round (158th overall) of the 1985 NFL draft by the St. Louis Cardinals. He was also selected by the Houston Gamblers in the fifth round (69th overall) of the 1985 USFL draft. As a rookie, he was a wide receiver and played mainly on special teams.

In 1986, he was moved to tight end, but was placed on the injured reserve list on August 19. He was activated on October 17, but was placed again on the injured reserve list on December 10.

In 1987, he began the season as the starter at tight end, until suffering a broken elbow against the New York Giants on October 25. After rookie Rob Awalt had a break-out game against the Philadelphia Eagles, Novacek was placed on the injured reserve list on November 2. He finished the season with 20 receptions for 254 yards and 3 touchdowns, producing just 2 receptions in his first two seasons and only 22 after three years.

In 1988, the Cardinals franchise moved to Phoenix and even though Awalt remained the starter at tight end, Novacek still ranked third on the team with 569 receiving yards and 4 receiving touchdowns. The next year with Gary Hogeboom instead of Neil Lomax as the team's starting quarterback, his production fell to 23 receptions for 225 yards and one touchdown.

In 1990, Joe Bugel was hired as the new head coach, who looked for the tight end position to be either a blocker or perform H-back type functions. Novacek was not seen as a good fit for the new system and was left unprotected—eligible to sign with any team under Plan B free agency.

=== Dallas Cowboys ===
In 1990, the Dallas Cowboys signed Novacek as a Plan B free agent, arguably the best signing in the history of this program. He was named the starter at tight end, even though the Cowboys also acquired Awalt to compete for the position. He would go on to have a break-out season, becoming one of the league's top receiving tight ends, while registering 59 receptions for 657 yards and 4 touchdowns.

He was a key contributor for the offense in the early 1990s, especially on third downs where he could find the soft spot in the defense. Beginning in 1991, he played in five straight Pro Bowls, while helping the Cowboys make the playoffs each year and winning the Super Bowl three times in four seasons. Although blocking was not his strength, he did a solid job locking up opponents.

In 1992, he was named an All-Pro after leading all tight ends with 68 receptions for 630 receiving yards and 6 touchdowns.

In 1995, he posted his second-highest single-season total for receptions (62) and touchdowns (5), to go along with a career-high in receiving yards (705). He underwent arthroscopic surgery on his right knee to repair a partial tear of his medial meniscus before the last game of the season, but still helped beat the Pittsburgh Steelers in Super Bowl XXX.

In 1996, although he missed the regular season because of a degenerative disc in his back, the Cowboys decided not to put him on injured reserve, in the hope he could be ready for the playoffs. On January 3, 1997, he was placed on the injured reserve list. On July 15, he officially retired from the NFL after his chronic lower-back problems cut short his career.

In his 11 seasons, Novacek recorded 422 receptions for 4,630 yards (ninth in team history) and 30 touchdowns, with most of his production coming from 1990 to 1995. He also came up big in the post-season, ranking third in franchise playoff history in receptions (62), receiving yards (645) and touchdown receptions (6).

== NFL career statistics ==
Legend
	Won the Super Bowl
**Bold**	Career high

=== Regular season ===
Year	Team	Games		Receiving					Fumbles	
Year	Team	GP	GS	Rec	Yds	Avg	Lng	TD	Fum	Lost
1985	STL	**16**	0	1	4	4.0	4	0	0	0
1986	STL	8	0	1	2	2.0	2	0	0	0
1987	STL	7	4	20	254	12.7	25	3	1	1
1988	PHO	**16**	1	38	569	**15.0**	42	4	0	0
1989	PHO	**16**	1	23	225	9.8	30	1	0	0
1990	DAL	**16**	15	59	657	11.1	41	4	1	0
1991	DAL	**16**	12	59	664	11.3	**49**	4	**3**	**2**
1992	DAL	**16**	**16**	**68**	630	9.3	34	**6**	0	0
1993	DAL	**16**	**16**	44	445	10.1	30	1	**3**	1
1994	DAL	**16**	14	47	475	10.1	27	2	0	0
1995	DAL	15	15	62	**705**	11.4	33	5	0	0
Career		158	94	422	4,630	11.0	49	30	8	4

=== Postseason ===
Year	Team	Games		Receiving					Fumbles	
Year	Team	GP	GS	Rec	Yds	Avg	Lng	TD	Fum	Lost
1991	DAL	2	2	5	58	**11.6**	25	1	0	0
1992	DAL	**3**	**3**	13	136	10.5	23	**2**	0	0
1993	DAL	**3**	**3**	15	142	9.5	20	**2**	0	0
1994	DAL	2	2	**16**	**176**	11.0	22	0	0	0
1995	DAL	**3**	**3**	13	133	10.2	**25**	1	0	0
Career		158	94	62	645	10.4	25	6	0	0
