= Ron Francis (gridiron football) =

American football player (born 1964)

No. 38
- Position: Cornerback

Personal information
- Born: April 7, 1964 (age 62); La Marque, Texas, U.S.
- Listed height: 5 ft 9 in (1.75 m)
- Listed weight: 201 lb (91 kg)

Career information
- High school: La Marque
- College: Baylor
- NFL draft: 1987: 2nd round, 39th overall pick

Career history
- Dallas Cowboys (1987–1990); New England Patriots (1991)*; BC Lions (1992–1993)
- * Offseason or practice squad member only

Awards and highlights
- Second-team All-American (1986); 2× All-SWC (1985, 1986); SWC defensive player of the year (1985)

Career NFL statistics
- Interceptions: 4
- Fumble recoveries: 3
- Touchdowns: 1
- Stats at Pro Football Reference

Ronald Bernard Francis (born April 7, 1964) is an American former professional football player who was a cornerback in the National Football League (NFL) for the Dallas Cowboys. He played college football for the Baylor Bears and was selected by the Cowboys in the second round of the 1987 NFL draft.

== Early life ==
Francis was one of the best state running backs at La Marque High School as a senior, receiving All-district honors. He played as a quarterback, wingback and safety in the previous years. He also practiced track.

He accepted a football scholarship from Baylor University. As a freshman, he was moved from running back to cornerback, starting 4 games while making 23 tackles and 6 passes defensed. In 1983, he was declared academically ineligible.

In 1984 as a sophomore, he was moved back to tailback and named the starter. He averaged 95.6 yards per game with three 100-yard efforts before suffering a pulled hamstring in the sixth game. He was also used as the short yardage quarterback. He finished with 127 carries for 558 yards (led the team), 5 rushing touchdowns, 12 receptions for 119 yards and 2 receiving touchdowns.

As a junior, he was moved again to cornerback, where he teamed with Thomas Everett to form one of the best defensive secondaries in college football. He posted 64 tackles, 6 interceptions (led the conference) and 12 passes defensed. He made 2 interceptions and a career-high eight tackles against the SWC champion Texas A&M University. In 1985, the defense ranked number 3 in the nation against the pass and he was named Southwest Conference defensive player of the year.

In 1986, the defense ranked third overall in the nation, with him recording 8 interceptions (led the conference), 2 fumbles recoveries and 11 passes defensed. He had a career-high 3 interceptions against the University of Texas.

Francis was a standout player in one of the school's most successful eras, as the Bears won 30 games and appeared in three Bowl games (2 wins). He was a two-time All-SWC selection and an honorable-mention All American. He finished with 14 interceptions and 29 passes defensed. In limited duty as a return man, he averaged 8.9 yards on 9 punt returns and 16.7 yards on 3 kickoff returns.

As a senior in 1986, he was honored as a second-team All-American by United Press International (UPI).

In 2017, he was inducted into the Baylor Athletics Hall of Fame.

== Professional career ==
Pre-draft measurables
Height	Weight	Arm length	Hand span	40-yard dash	10-yard split	20-yard split	20-yard shuttle	Vertical jump	Broad jump	Bench press
5 ft 9 3/8 in (1.76 m)	188 lb (85 kg)	30 in (0.76 m)	8 1/2 in (0.22 m)	4.49 s	1.59 s	2.65 s	4.06 s	34.0 in (0.86 m)	9 ft 7 in (2.92 m)	8 reps
All values from NFL Combine

=== Dallas Cowboys ===
He was selected by the Dallas Cowboys in the second round (39th overall) of the 1987 NFL draft. After the team traded cornerback Ron Fellows, Francis became the first rookie in 6 years to open the season as a starter for the team. He registered 48 tackles, 2 interceptions (one returned for a touchdown), 12 passes defensed (second on the team), 2 fumble recoveries (tied for the team lead).

In 1988, he entered the season as the starter at right cornerback, before dislocating his left shoulder during an intrasquad game in pre-season. The injury forced him to miss 2 months and allowed former Baylor teammate Robert Williams to win the starting position outright. Francis returned in the third game and would play as the third cornerback on passing situations. He collected 25 tackles, one interception and 7 passes defensed.

In 1989, Williams suffered a sprained knee in the third game against the Washington Redskins, opening the door for Francis to regain the starting position. In the fourth game against the New York Giants he tallied one interception. The next game against the Green Bay Packers he had a career-high 10 tackles and one pass defensed. After Williams returned to the lineup, they split time at cornerback until the fourteenth game against the Philadelphia Eagles, when he had 2 passes defensed during extended action in the second half. He started the last 2 games of the season. He posted 34 tackles, one interception (tied for second on the team) and 10 passes defensed (tied for the team lead).

In 1990, he returned to a backup role, appearing in 15 games.

=== New England Patriots ===
Francis was traded to the New England Patriots on February 19, 1991. In exchange for the first overall draft pick of the 1991 NFL draft (Russell Maryland), he was traded to the Patriots along with linebacker Eugene Lockhart, linebacker David Howard, a 1991 first round pick (#11 Pat Harlow) and a 1991 second round pick (#41 Jerome Henderson). He was waived on August 26.

=== BC Lions ===
In 1992, he was signed by the BC Lions of the Canadian Football League. He appeared in 9 games, making 20 tackles, 2 fumble recoveries and one sack. The next year, he appeared in 2 games.

== Personal life ==
His brother James Francis played linebacker in the NFL for the Cincinnati Bengals.
