= Paul McFadden =

American football player (born 1961)

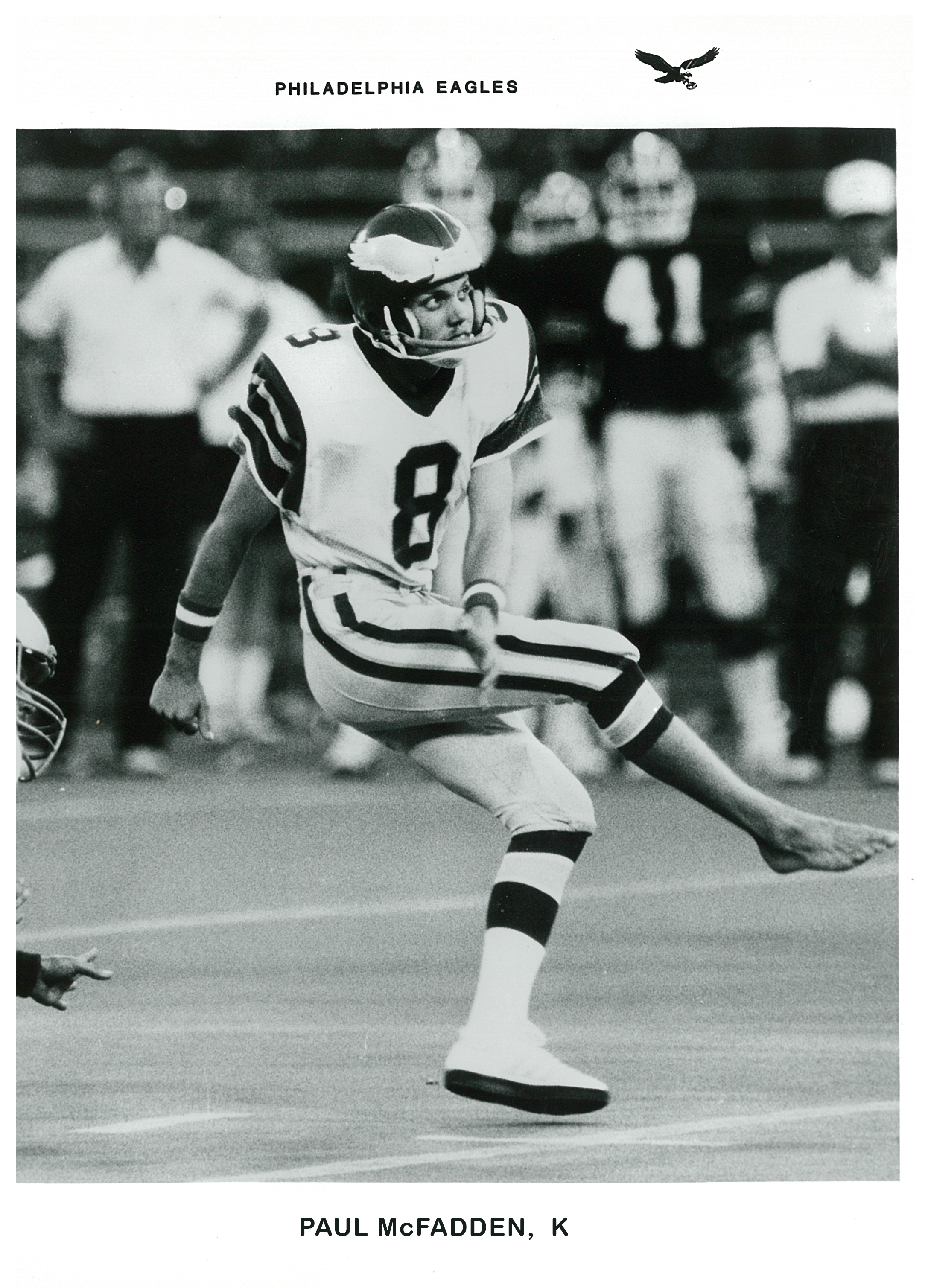
- McFadden in 1984; Photo by Annemarie Mountz

No. 8, 6
- Position: Placekicker

Personal information
- Born: September 24, 1961 (age 65); Cleveland, Ohio, U.S.
- Listed height: 5 ft 11 in (1.80 m)
- Listed weight: 163 lb (74 kg)

Career information
- High school: Euclid (Euclid, Ohio)
- College: Youngstown State
- NFL draft: 1984: 12th round, 312th overall pick

Career history
- Philadelphia Eagles (1984–1987); New York Giants (1988); Atlanta Falcons (1989)

Awards and highlights
- 1984 UPI. NFC Rookie of the Year; PFWA All-Rookie Team (1984)

Career NFL statistics
- Field goals made: 120
- Field goal attempts: 163
- Field goal %: 73.6
- Longest field goal: 54
- Stats at Pro Football Reference

Paul McFadden (born September 24, 1961) is an American former professional football player who was a placekicker in the National Football League (NFL). He gained recognition at the collegiate level as a kicker at Youngstown State University. McFadden became widely known for his barefooted kicking style.

He made his professional debut with the Philadelphia Eagles in 1984. That season he led the NFL in field goals kicked (30), was named NFC Rookie of the Year, and voted Co-MVP of the Eagles by his teammates. He repeated as Co-MVP of the Eagles in 1985, and remained with the team until 1987. He spent his final years in the NFL with the New York Giants (1988) and Atlanta Falcons (1989), respectively. His final NFL game was on 5 November 1989.

After ending his career as a professional football player, McFadden returned to Youngstown, where he served as director of athletic development from 1993 to 2002 and Chief Development Officer from 2002 to 2011 at Youngstown State University. In 2011, he was appointed as President of the Youngstown State University Foundation. He currently resides in northeastern Ohio.

He earned a BA in history from Youngstown State University in 1992, and a MA from Saint Mary's University of Minnesota in 2000.
