= Earl Ferrell =

American football player (born 1958)

No. 31
- Position: Running back

Personal information
- Born: March 27, 1958 (age 68); Halifax, Virginia, U.S.
- Listed height: 6 ft 0 in (1.83 m)
- Listed weight: 225 lb (102 kg)

Career information
- High school: Halifax Co. (South Boston, Virginia)
- College: East Tennessee State
- NFL draft: 1982: 5th round, 125th overall pick

Career history
- St. Louis/Phoenix Cardinals (1982–1989)

Career NFL statistics
- Rushing yards: 2,950
- Average: 4.3
- Rushing touchdowns: 24
- Stats at Pro Football Reference

Earl Thomas Ferrell (born March 27, 1958), is an American former professional football player who was a running back in the National Football League (NFL). He played college football for the East Tennessee State Buccaneers and was selected 125th overall by the St. Louis Cardinals in the fifth round of the 1982 NFL draft. Standing 6 ft 0 in (1.83 m) and 220 lbs., Ferrell played his entire NFL career for the Cardinals from 1982 to 1989. He led all Cardinals running backs in rushing yards during the 1988 and 1989 seasons, the team's first two years playing in Phoenix.

He was the second player, and one of only four in the school's history, to be selected in the draft and play in the NFL after playing college football at ETSU.

After a Pro Bowl appearance in each of his final two seasons, Ferrell's career was cut short due to problems with illegal drugs. In 1988, Ferrell reportedly tested positive three times for cocaine and, before the 1990 season, he was suspended for one year because of another failed drug test. He never played in the NFL again. On receiving the news of his suspension, Ferrell chose to retire.
