= 1988 NFL season =

American football season

Regular season
- Duration: September 4 – December 19, 1988

Playoffs
- Start date: December 24, 1988
- AFC Champions: Cincinnati Bengals
- NFC Champions: San Francisco 49ers

Super Bowl XXIII
- Date: January 22, 1989
- Site: Joe Robbie Stadium, Miami
- Champions: San Francisco 49ers

Pro Bowl
- Date: January 29, 1989
- Site: Aloha Stadium

AFC teams: West, Central, East
NFC teams: West, Central, East

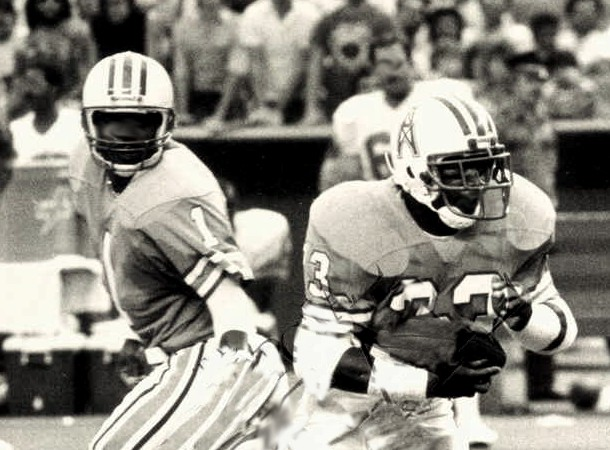
Quarterback Warren Moon (left) and running back Mike Rozier (right) of the Houston Oilers were among the league's top passers and rushers, respectively.

The 1988 NFL season was the 69th regular season of the National Football League. The Cardinals relocated from St. Louis, Missouri, to the Phoenix, Arizona, area becoming the Phoenix Cardinals but remained in the NFC East division. The playoff races came down to the regular season's final week, with the Seattle Seahawks winning the AFC West by one game, and the Philadelphia Eagles and San Francisco 49ers winning their respective divisions in a five-way tie, with the New Orleans Saints and New York Giants losing the NFC Wild Card berth to the Los Angeles Rams on tiebreakers.

1988 marked the final seasons for legendary head coaches Tom Landry of Dallas and Bill Walsh of San Francisco as well as the final full year for commissioner Pete Rozelle.

The season ended with Super Bowl XXIII when the San Francisco 49ers defeated the Cincinnati Bengals 20–16 at the Joe Robbie Stadium in Florida.

== Transactions ==
=== Retirements ===
- January 19, 1988: The Pittsburgh Steelers announce that Donnie Shell and John Stallworth have retired from professional football.

=== Draft ===
The 1988 NFL draft was held from April 24 to 25, 1988, at New York City's Marriott Marquis. With the first pick, the Atlanta Falcons selected linebacker Aundray Bruce from Auburn University.

== Officiating changes ==
Johnny Grier became the first African-American in NFL history to be promoted to referee. Grier replaced Bob Frederic, who retired in the offseason after 17 seasons as a referee. Grier was the field judge in the previous season's Super Bowl XXII, which was the same game that Doug Williams of the Washington Redskins became the first African-American quarterback to win the Super Bowl. Grier would be a referee until a career-ending injury during the 2004 season.

== Major rule changes ==
- A standard system of two time intervals between plays are established (and would be timed using the play clock): For normal plays, the offensive team has 45 seconds to snap the ball after the previous play is signaled dead. After time outs and other administrative stoppages, the time limit is 30 seconds beginning after the Referee signals that the ball is ready to resume play.
- If a fumble occurs during an extra point attempt, only the fumbling player can recover and/or advance the ball. This change closes a loophole in the "Stabler Fumble Rule" that was enacted during the 1979 NFL season in reaction to the Holy Roller Game.
- The penalty for running into the kicker was changed from five yards and an automatic first down to just five yards.

== 1988 deaths ==
- Alan Ameche: Having played for the Baltimore Colts in the 1950s, he died of a heart attack on August 8, 1988, at age 55 at Methodist Hospital in Houston, Texas, a few days after undergoing another heart bypass surgery.
- Steve Chomyszak
- David Croudip: The Atlanta Falcons cornerback died on October 10 after a cocaine overdose.
- Hall Haynes
- Clarke Hinkle
- Joe Don Looney
- Nick Pietrosante
- Art Rooney: The Pittsburgh Steelers founding owner died on August 25 following complications from a stroke.
- Joey Sternaman

== Preseason ==
=== American Bowl ===
A series of National Football League pre-season exhibition games that were held at sites outside the United States, the only American Bowl game in 1988 was held at London's Wembley Stadium.

Date	Winning team	Score	Losing team	Score	Stadium	City
July 31, 1988	Miami Dolphins	27	San Francisco 49ers	21	Wembley Stadium	(United Kingdom) London

== Regular season ==
=== Scheduling formula ===
Inter-conference
AFC East vs NFC Central
AFC Central vs NFC East
AFC West vs NFC West

Highlights of the 1988 season included:

- Thanksgiving: Two games were played on Thursday, November 24, featuring Minnesota at Detroit and Houston at Dallas, with Minnesota and Houston winning. This was the last time until 2000 both visiting teams won on Thanksgiving.

=== Final standings ===
AFC East
	W	L	T	PCT	DIV	CONF	PF	PA	STK
^{(2)} Buffalo Bills	12	4	0	.750	7–1	10–2	329	237	L1
Indianapolis Colts	9	7	0	.563	5–3	7–5	354	315	W1
New England Patriots	9	7	0	.563	5–3	7–5	250	284	L1
New York Jets	8	7	1	.531	3–5	6–7–1	372	354	W2
Miami Dolphins	6	10	0	.375	0–8	3–9	319	380	L1

AFC Central
	W	L	T	PCT	DIV	CONF	PF	PA	STK
^{(1)} Cincinnati Bengals	12	4	0	.750	4–2	8–4	448	329	W1
^{(4)} Cleveland Browns	10	6	0	.625	4–2	6–6	304	288	W1
^{(5)} Houston Oilers	10	6	0	.625	3–3	7–5	424	365	L1
Pittsburgh Steelers	5	11	0	.313	1–5	4–8	336	421	W1

AFC West
	W	L	T	PCT	DIV	CONF	PF	PA	STK
^{(3)} Seattle Seahawks	9	7	0	.563	6–2	8–4	339	329	W2
Denver Broncos	8	8	0	.500	3–5	5–7	327	352	W1
Los Angeles Raiders	7	9	0	.438	6–2	6–6	325	369	L2
San Diego Chargers	6	10	0	.375	3–5	4–8	231	332	W2
Kansas City Chiefs	4	11	1	.281	2–6	4–9–1	254	320	L2

NFC East
	W	L	T	PCT	DIV	CONF	PF	PA	STK
^{(3)} Philadelphia Eagles	10	6	0	.625	6–2	8–4	379	319	W2
New York Giants	10	6	0	.625	5–3	9–5	359	304	L1
Washington Redskins	7	9	0	.438	4–4	6–6	345	387	L2
Phoenix Cardinals	7	9	0	.438	3–5	6–6	344	398	L5
Dallas Cowboys	3	13	0	.188	2–6	3–9	265	381	L1

NFC Central
	W	L	T	PCT	DIV	CONF	PF	PA	STK
^{(1)} Chicago Bears	12	4	0	.750	6–2	9–3	312	215	L1
^{(4)} Minnesota Vikings	11	5	0	.688	6–2	9–3	406	233	W1
Tampa Bay Buccaneers	5	11	0	.313	4–4	4–8	261	350	W1
Detroit Lions	4	12	0	.250	2–6	3–11	220	315	L2
Green Bay Packers	4	12	0	.250	2–6	3–9	240	313	W2

NFC West
	W	L	T	PCT	DIV	CONF	PF	PA	STK
^{(2)} San Francisco 49ers	10	6	0	.625	4–2	8–4	369	294	L1
^{(5)} Los Angeles Rams	10	6	0	.625	4–2	8–4	407	293	W3
New Orleans Saints	10	6	0	.625	3–3	6–6	312	283	W1
Atlanta Falcons	5	11	0	.313	1–5	4–8	244	315	L3

=== Tiebreakers ===
- Cincinnati was the top AFC playoff seed ahead of Buffalo based on head-to-head victory (1–0).
- Indianapolis finished ahead of New England in the AFC East based on better record against common opponents (7–5 to Patriots' 6–6).
- Cleveland finished ahead of Houston in the AFC Central based on better division record (4–2 to Oilers' 3–3).
- San Francisco was the second NFC playoff seed ahead of Philadelphia on better record against common opponents (5–3 to Eagles' 5–4).
- Philadelphia finished first in the NFC East based on head-to-head sweep of the N.Y. Giants (2–0).
- Washington finished third in the NFC East based on better division record (4–4) than Phoenix (3–5).
- Detroit finished fourth in the NFC Central based on head-to-head sweep of Green Bay (2–0).
- San Francisco finished first in the NFC West based on better head-to-head record (3–1) against the L.A. Rams (2–2) and New Orleans (1–3).
- The L.A. Rams finished second in the NFC West based on better division record (4–2) than New Orleans (3–3).
- Rams earned the #2 NFC Wild Card based on better conference record (8–4, .667) than the N.Y. Giants (9–5, .642) and New Orleans (6–6, .500).

== Playoffs ==
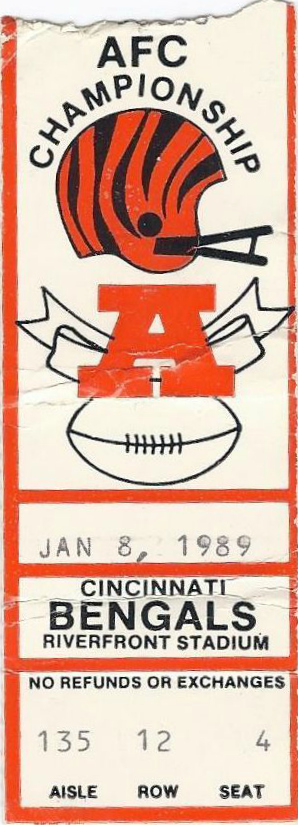
A ticket for the AFC Championship Game between the Bengals and the Bills.

Note: The Cincinnati Bengals (the AFC 1 seed) did not play the Houston Oilers (the 5 seed), nor did the Chicago Bears (the NFC 1 seed) play the Minnesota Vikings (the 4 seed), in the Divisional playoff round because those teams were in the same division.

Jan 1 – Rich Stadium
5	Houston	10
Dec 24 – Cleveland Stadium	Jan 8 – Riverfront Stadium
2*	Buffalo	17
AFC
5	Houston	24	2	Buffalo	10
Dec 31 – Riverfront Stadium
4	Cleveland	23	1	Cincinnati	21
AFC Championship
3	Seattle	13
Jan 22 – Joe Robbie Stadium
1*	Cincinnati	21
Divisional round
Wild-card round	A1	Cincinnati	16
Jan 1 – Candlestick Park
N2	San Francisco	20
Super Bowl XXIII
4	Minnesota	9
Dec 26 – Hubert H. Humphrey Metrodome	Jan 8 – Soldier Field
2*	San Francisco	34
NFC
5	LA Rams	17	2	San Francisco	28
Dec 31 – Soldier Field
4	Minnesota	28	1	Chicago	3
NFC Championship
3	Philadelphia	12
1*	Chicago	20

== Statistical leaders ==
=== Team ===
Points scored	Cincinnati Bengals (448)
Total yards gained	Cincinnati Bengals (6,057)
Yards rushing	Cincinnati Bengals (2,710)
Yards passing	Miami Dolphins (4,516)
Fewest points allowed	Chicago Bears (215)
Fewest total yards allowed	Minnesota Vikings (4,091)
Fewest rushing yards allowed	Chicago Bears (1,326)
Fewest passing yards allowed	Kansas City Chiefs (2,434)

== Awards ==
Most Valuable Player	Boomer Esiason, quarterback, Cincinnati
Coach of the Year	Mike Ditka, Chicago
Offensive Player of the Year	Roger Craig, running back, San Francisco
Defensive Player of the Year	Mike Singletary, linebacker, Chicago
Offensive Rookie of the Year	John Stephens, running back, New England
Defensive Rookie of the Year	Erik McMillan, safety, NY Jets
NFL Comeback Player of the Year	Greg Bell, running back, LA Rams
NFL Man of the Year	Steve Largent, wide receiver, Seattle
Super Bowl Most Valuable Player	Jerry Rice, wide receiver, San Francisco

== Coaching changes ==
=== Offseason ===
- Green Bay Packers: Forrest Gregg left to join the SMU Mustangs. Lindy Infante was named as Gregg's replacement.
- Los Angeles Raiders: Tom Flores stepped down to move to the team's front office. Mike Shanahan was named as the team's new head coach.

=== In-season ===
- Detroit Lions: Darryl Rogers was fired after 11 games and replaced by defensive coordinator Wayne Fontes.

== Stadium changes ==
The relocated Phoenix Cardinals moved from Busch Memorial Stadium in St. Louis to Sun Devil Stadium in Tempe, Arizona.

== Uniform changes ==
- Referees were outfitted with white hats while all other officials wore black hats, matching the standard practice in college and high school football. From 1979 through 1987, the reverse convention--the same as the Canadian Football League at the time--was used, with referees wearing black hats with all other officials wearing white hats.
- The Green Bay Packers removed the elliptical green circles with the player's number from the hip area of the pants, also removing the gold stripe in the middle, one of the additions made in 1984 by former coach Forrest Gregg; the team also added a small gold stripe on their socks.
- The Los Angeles Raiders switch to a darker silver pants.
- The New England Patriots dropped the red road pants they had worn since 1984; the red pants would return in 1990.
- The San Diego Chargers switched to a darker shade of blue on their jerseys, from gold to blue face masks, and from gold to white lightning bolts. The helmets remained unchanged until a complete redesign in 2007.

== Television ==
This was the second year under the league's three-year broadcast contracts with ABC, CBS, NBC, and ESPN to televise Monday Night Football, the NFC package, the AFC package, and Sunday Night Football, respectively. Joe Theismann took over as lead color commentator in ESPN's booth, replacing Roy Firestone, while the weekly "guest color commentator" spot was discontinued. Meanwhile, Dick Butkus joined The NFL Today as analyst, alongside host Brent Musburger and Irv Cross.

A number of NBC's regular NFL commentators were temporarily replaced while they called the network's coverage of the 1988 Summer Olympics in Seoul, South Korea from September 17 to October 2. Among them, Len Berman returned to the NFL on NBC pregame show to fill-in for host Bob Costas, while Curt Gowdy, Ray Scott, Chuck Thompson, Marty Glickman, Merle Harmon, and Al DeRogatis filled-in on the network's various broadcast crews.
