= 1987 New York Giants season =

NFL team season

- Owner: Wellington Mara
- General manager: George Young
- Head coach: Bill Parcells
- Offensive coordinator: Ron Erhardt
- Defensive coordinator: Bill Belichick
- Home stadium: Giants Stadium

Results
- Record: 6–9
- Division place: 5th NFC East
- Playoffs: Did not qualify
- Pro Bowlers: LB Lawrence Taylor

The 1987 season was the New York Giants' 63rd in the National Football League (NFL) and their fifth under head coach Bill Parcells. The Giants entered the season as the defending Super Bowl champion but failed to qualify for the playoffs. They were the sixth team in NFL history to enter a season as the defending Super Bowl champion and miss the playoffs. The Giants started the season 0–5, becoming the first defending Super Bowl champion to lose their first 5 games. Ultimately, the Giants never recovered from their dismal start and failed to improve on their 14–2 record from 1986 and finished at 6–9. They were eliminated from playoff contention for the first time since 1983. They also placed last in their division for the first time since that same season.

== Offseason ==
=== NFL draft ===
1987 New York Giants draft
Round	Pick	Player	Position	College	Notes
1	28	Mark Ingram	WR	Michigan State	
2	55	Adrian White	DB	Florida	
3	83	Stephen Baker	WR	Fresno State	
4	112	Odessa Turner	WR	Northwestern State	
5	140	Paul O'Connor	G	Miami (FL)	
6	160	Tim Richardson	RB	Pacific	
6	168	Doug Riesenberg	OT	California	
8	223	Rod Jones	TE	Washington	
9	225	Stan Parker	G	Nebraska	
9	251	Dana Wright	RB	Findlay	
10	279	Chuck Faucette	LB	Maryland	
11	307	Dave Walter	QB	Michigan Tech	
12	321	Bill Berthusen	DT	Iowa State	
12	329	Chad Stark	RB	North Dakota State	
Made roster † Pro Football Hall of Fame * Made at least one Pro Bowl during career

== Personnel ==
=== Staff ===
1987 New York Giants staff
Front office: President – Wellington Mara; General manager – George Young; Director of pro personnel – Tim Rooney; Head coaches: Head coach – Bill Parcells; Offensive coaches: Offensive coordinator – Ron Erhardt; Offensive backfield – Ray Handley; Receivers – Pat Hodgson; Tight ends – Mike Pope; Offensive line – Fred Hoaglin	Defensive coaches: Defensive coordinator – Bill Belichick; Defensive line – Lamar Leachman; Defensive backfield – Len Fontes; Defensive assistant – Mike Sweatman; Special teams coaches: Special teams – Romeo Crennel; Assistant special teams – Mike Sweatman; Strength and conditioning: Strength and Conditioning – Johnny Parker

=== NFL replacement players ===
After the league decided to use replacement players during the NFLPA strike, the following team was assembled:

1987 New York Giants replacement roster
Quarterbacks: 8 Mike Busch; 9 Jim Crocicchia; 15 Paul Kelly; Running backs: 26 Earl Beecham; 29 Jaime Covington; 36 Robert DiRico; 41 Kaulana Park; Wide receivers: 10 Beau Almodobar; 87 Lewis Bennett; 19 Mack Cummings; 88 Edwin Lovelady; 18 Reggie McGowan; 84 Warren Seitz; Tight ends: 83 Charles Coleman; 85 Jeff Smith	Offensive linemen: 64 Mike Black; 72 Kelvin Davis; 68 Bill Dugan; 90 Chris Jones; 78 Kevin Meuth; 74 Russell Mitchell; 61 Dan Morgan; 76 Frank Sutton; 59 Gregg Swartwoudt; 73 Scott Urch; Defensive linemen: 77 Dennis Borcky; 99 Reggie Carr; 94 Curtis Garrett; 71 Anthony Howard; 93 Brian Sisley; 98 Bini Scott	Linebackers: 91 Charlie Burgess; 95 Chris Davis; 59 Dan DeRose; 65 Jerry Kimmel; 96 Frank Nicholson; 97 Warren Thompson; 92 Jeff Tootle; Defensive backs: 21 Boris Byrd; 49 Jimmy Norris; 28 Rob Porter; 31 Steve Rehage; 38 Doug Smith; 45 Jim Yarbrough; Special teams: 3 George Benyola K; 6 Dana Moore P

=== Roster ===
1987 New York Giants roster
Quarterbacks (QB): 15 Jeff Hostetler; 17 Jeff Rutledge; 11 Phil Simms; Running backs (RB): 33 George Adams; 24 Ottis Anderson; 44 Maurice Carthon; 30 Tony Galbreath; 20 Joe Morris; 22 Lee Rouson; 41 Mike Varajon; Wide receivers (WR): 85 Stephen Baker; 82 Mark Ingram; 86 Lionel Manuel; 80 Phil McConkey; 83 Odessa Turner; Tight ends (TE): 89 Mark Bavaro; 84 Zeke Mowatt	Offensive linemen (OL): 67 Billy Ard G; 60 Brad Benson T; 61 Chris Godfrey G; 68 Damian Johnson G; 59 Brian Johnston C; 65 Bart Oates C; 72 Doug Riesenberg T; 66 William Roberts T; Defensive linemen (DL): 79 Bill Berthusen NT; 77 Eric Dorsey DE; 74 Erik Howard NT; 75 George Martin DE; 73 John Washington DE	Linebackers (LB): 58 Carl Banks OLB; 53 Harry Carson ILB; 54 Andy Headen OLB; 57 Byron Hunt OLB; 52 Pepper Johnson ILB; 51 Robbie Jones ILB; 55 Gary Reasons ILB; 56 Lawrence Taylor OLB; Defensive backs (DB): 47 Donald Brown CB; 28 Tom Flynn FS; 37 Wayne Haddix CB; 48 Kenny Hill SS; 43 Terry Kinard FS; 46 Greg Lasker SS; 27 Herb Welch CB/S; 36 Adrian White SS; 23 Perry Williams CB; Special teams (ST): 2 Raúl Allegre K; 5 Sean Landeta P	Reserve: 64 Jim Burt NT (IR); 21 Harvey Clayton CB (IR); 25 Mark Collins CB (IR); 9 Jim Crocicchia QB (IR); 19 Mack Cummings WR (IR); 70 Leonard Marshall DE (IR); 63 Karl Nelson T (NF-Ill.); 81 Stacy Robinson WR (IR); Rookies in italics

== Preseason ==
Week	Date	Opponent	Result	Record	Venue
1	August 15	at New England Patriots	W 19–17	1–0	Foxboro Stadium
2	August 22	Cleveland Browns	W 24–10	2–0	Giants Stadium
3	August 29	New York Jets	L 23–30	2-1	Giants Stadium
4	September 5	at Pittsburgh Steelers	W 26–20	3–1	Three Rivers Stadium

== Regular season ==
=== Schedule ===
Week	Date	Opponent	Result	Record	Venue	Recap
1	September 14	at Chicago Bears	**L** 19–34	0–1	Soldier Field	Recap
2	September 20	**Dallas Cowboys**	**L** 14–16	0–2	Giants Stadium	Recap
3	—N/a	at Miami Dolphins	**Cancelled due to the 1987 NFL strike**			
4	October 5	San Francisco 49ers	**L** 21–41	0–3	Giants Stadium	Recap
5	October 11	**Washington Redskins**	**L** 12–38	0–4	Giants Stadium	Recap
6	October 18	at Buffalo Bills	**L** 3–6 (OT)	0–5	Rich Stadium	Recap
7	October 25	**St. Louis Cardinals**	**W** 30–7	1–5	Giants Stadium	Recap
8	November 2	at **Dallas Cowboys**	**L** 24–33	1–6	Texas Stadium	Recap
9	November 8	New England Patriots	**W** 17–10	2–6	Giants Stadium	Recap
10	November 15	at **Philadelphia Eagles**	**W** 20–17	3–6	Veterans Stadium	Recap
11	November 22	at New Orleans Saints	**L** 14–23	3–7	Louisiana Superdome	Recap
12	November 29	at **Washington Redskins**	**L** 19–23	3–8	RFK Stadium	Recap
13	December 6	**Philadelphia Eagles**	**W** 23–20 (OT)	4–8	Giants Stadium	Recap
14	December 13	at **St. Louis Cardinals**	**L** 24–27	4–9	Busch Stadium	Recap
15	December 19	Green Bay Packers	**W** 20–10	5–9	Giants Stadium	Recap
16	December 27	New York Jets	**W** 20–7	6–9	Giants Stadium	Recap
Note: Intra-division opponents are in **bold** text.

=== Game summaries ===
==== Week 1 ====
Team	1	2	3	4	Total
Giants	7	0	6	6	19
• Bears	3	7	14	10	34

- Date: September 14
- Location: Soldier Field, Chicago, Illinois
- Game start: 8:00 p.m.
- Game weather: 62 °F (16.7 °C), wind 6 miles per hour (9.7 km/h; 5.2 kn)
- Referee: Jim Tunney
- TV announcers (ABC): Al Michaels, Frank Gifford and Dan Dierdorf

==== Week 2 ====
Team	1	2	3	4	Total
• Cowboys	3	7	3	3	16
Giants	7	0	7	0	14

- Date: September 20
- Location: Giants Stadium, East Rutherford, New Jersey
- Game start: 4:00 p.m.
- Game weather: 60 °F (15.6 °C), wind 16 miles per hour (26 km/h; 14 kn)
- Referee: Jerry Markbreit

==== Week 3 ====
Team	1	2	3	4	Total
• 49ers	3	14	10	14	41
Giants	0	7	0	14	21

- Date: October 5
- Location: Giants Stadium, East Rutherford, New Jersey
- Game start: 9:00 p.m.
- Game weather: 56 °F (13.3 °C), wind 12 miles per hour (19 km/h; 10 kn)
- Referee: Gene Barth
- Television network: ABC

==== Week 4 ====
Team	1	2	3	4	Total
• Redskins	3	21	7	7	38
Giants	3	0	9	0	12

- Date: October 11
- Location: Giants Stadium, East Rutherford, New Jersey
- Game start: 4:00 p.m.
- Game weather: 52 °F (11.1 °C), wind 13 miles per hour (21 km/h; 11 kn)
- Referee: Tom Dooley
- TV announcers (CBS): Pat Summerall and John Madden

==== Week 5 ====
Team	1	2	3	4	OT	Total
Giants	0	0	3	0	0	3
• Bills	0	0	0	3	3	6

- Date: October 18
- Location: Rich Stadium, Orchard Park, New York
- Game start: 4:00 p.m.
- Game weather: 53 °F (11.7 °C), wind 15 miles per hour (24 km/h; 13 kn)
- Referee: Bob McElwee

==== Week 6 ====
Team	1	2	3	4	Total
Cardinals	0	0	0	7	7
• Giants	14	3	3	10	30

- Date: October 25
- Location: Giants Stadium, East Rutherford, New Jersey
- Game start: 4:00 p.m.
- Game weather: 56 °F (13.3 °C), wind 19 miles per hour (31 km/h; 17 kn)
- Referee: Red Cashion

==== Week 7 ====
Team	1	2	3	4	Total
Giants	0	10	7	7	24
• Cowboys	7	7	0	19	33

- Date: November 2
- Location: Texas Stadium, Irving, Texas
- Game start: 8:00 p.m.
- Game weather: 69 °F (20.6 °C), wind 14 miles per hour (23 km/h; 12 kn)
- Referee: Fred Wyant
- Television network: ABC

==== Week 8 ====
Team	1	2	3	4	Total
Patriots	0	0	7	3	10
• Giants	0	14	3	0	17

- Date: November 8
- Location: Giants Stadium, East Rutherford, New Jersey
- Game start: 8:00 p.m.
- Game weather: 55 °F (12.8 °C), wind 12 miles per hour (19 km/h; 10 kn)
- Referee: Jerry Seeman

==== Week 9 ====
Team	1	2	3	4	Total
• **Giants**	7	3	7	3	20
Eagles	10	0	7	0	17

- Date: November 15
- Location: Veterans Stadium • Philadelphia, Pennsylvania
- Game start: 4:00 p.m. EST
- Game weather: 50 °F (10 °C), wind 8 miles per hour (13 km/h; 7.0 kn)
- Referee: Gordon McCarter

Scoring summary
1	PHI	Randall Cunningham 4 yard run (Paul McFadden kick)	Eagles 7–0
1	PHI	Paul McFadden 25 yard field goal	Eagles 10–0
1	NYG	Lionel Manuel 36 yard pass from Jeff Rutledge (Raúl Allegre kick)	Eagles 10–7
2	NYG	Raúl Allegre 53 yard field goal	Tie 10–10
3	PHI	Keith Byars 8 yard pass from Randall Cunningham (Paul McFadden kick)	Eagles 17–10
3	NYG	George Adams 1 yard run (Raúl Allegre kick)	Tie 17–17
4	NYG	Raúl Allegre 52 yard field goal	Giants 20–17

==== Week 10 ====
Team	1	2	3	4	Total
Giants	0	7	7	0	14
• Saints	3	10	0	10	23

- Date: November 22
- Location: Louisiana Superdome, New Orleans, Louisiana
- Game start: 3:00 p.m.
- Game weather: indoors (dome)
- Referee: Tom Dooley

==== Week 11 ====
Team	1	2	3	4	Total
Giants	10	6	3	0	19
• Redskins	0	0	9	14	23

- Date: November 29
- Location: RFK Stadium, Washington, D.C.
- Game start: 4:00 p.m.
- Game weather: 52 °F (11.1 °C), wind 11 miles per hour (18 km/h; 9.6 kn)
- Referee: Pat Haggerty

==== Week 12 ====
Team	1	2	3	4	OT	Total
Eagles	0	6	0	14	0	20
• Giants	7	0	6	7	3	23

- Date: December 6
- Location: Giants Stadium, East Rutherford, New Jersey
- Game start: 1:00 p.m.
- Game weather: 38 °F (3.3 °C), wind 22 miles per hour (35 km/h; 19 kn)
- Referee: Gene Barth

==== Week 13 ====
Team	1	2	3	4	Total
Giants	7	3	7	7	24
• Cardinals	14	13	0	0	27

- Date: December 13
- Location: Busch Stadium, St. Louis, Missouri
- Game start: 3:00 p.m.
- Game weather: 34 °F (1.1 °C), wind 9 miles per hour (14 km/h; 7.8 kn)
- Referee: Jerry Markbreit
- TV announcers (CBS): Dick Stockton & Terry Bradshaw

==== Week 14 ====
Team	1	2	3	4	Total
Packers	0	0	3	7	10
• Giants	0	13	7	0	20

- Date: December 19
- Location: Giants Stadium, East Rutherford, New Jersey
- Game start: 12:30 p.m.
- Game weather: 37 °F (2.8 °C), wind 12 miles per hour (19 km/h; 10 kn)
- Referee: Jerry Seeman

==== Week 15 ====
Team	1	2	3	4	Total
Jets	7	0	0	0	7
• Giants	0	17	3	0	20

- Date: December 27
- Location: Giants Stadium, East Rutherford, New Jersey
- Game start: 1:00 p.m.
- Game weather: 35 °F (1.7 °C), wind 11 miles per hour (18 km/h; 9.6 kn)
- Referee: Tom Dooley

=== Standings ===
NFC East
	W	L	T	PCT	DIV	CONF	PF	PA	STK
Washington Redskins^{(3)}	11	4	0	.733	7–1	9–3	379	285	W1
Dallas Cowboys	7	8	0	.467	4–4	5–7	340	348	W2
St. Louis Cardinals	7	8	0	.467	3–5	7–7	362	368	L1
Philadelphia Eagles	7	8	0	.467	3–5	4–7	337	380	W2
New York Giants	6	9	0	.400	3–5	4–8	280	312	W2

== Awards and honors ==
- Lawrence Taylor, NFC Pro Bowl selection
- Lawrence Taylor, Pro Football Weekly: 1st team all-conf.
- Lawrence Taylor, UPI: 2nd team all-conf.
- Lawrence Taylor, Associated Press: 2nd team all-NFL
- Lawrence Taylor, Pro Football Weekly: 1st team all-NFL
