= NFL on television =

Television coverage of the National Football League is the subject of the following articles:

- NFL on American television
- NFL on Canadian television
- List of current National Football League broadcasters § International broadcasters
