= Kaulana =

Kaulana is a given name. Notable people with the name include:

- Kaulana Noa (born 1976), American football player
- Kaulana Park (born 1962), American football player

== See also ==
- Kaulana Nā Pua, song
