= NFL on American television =

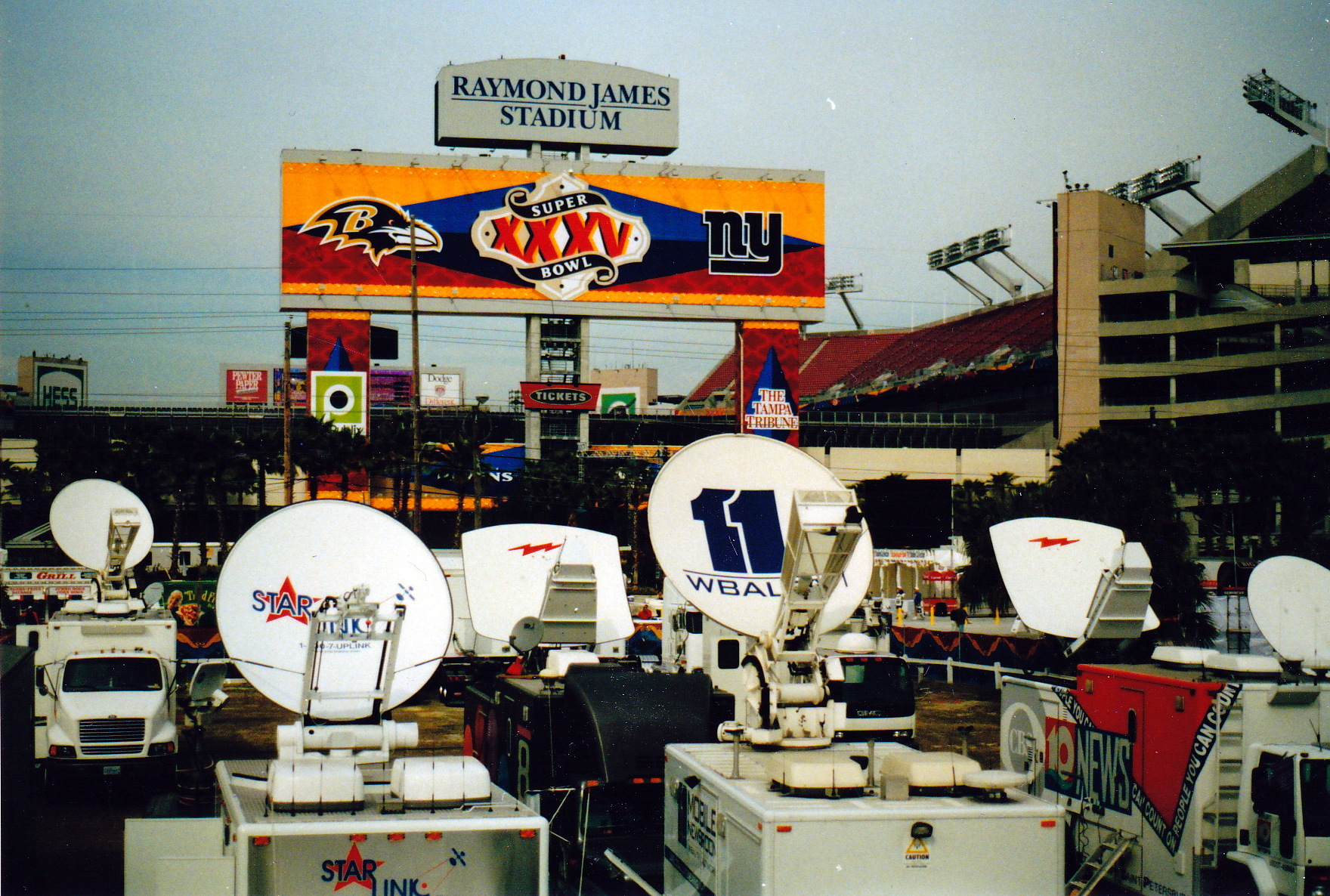
Satellite trucks broadcasting from Super Bowl XXXV at the Raymond James Stadium in Tampa, Florida. National Football League broadcasts are among the most-watched programs on American television.

The television rights to broadcast National Football League (NFL) games in the United States are the most lucrative and expensive rights of any sport in the world. Television brought professional football into prominence in the modern era after World War II. Since then, National Football League broadcasts have become the most-watched programs on American television.

Since the 1960s, all regular season and playoff games broadcast in the United States have been aired by national television networks. Since 1998, regionally shown regular season games on Sunday afternoons have been televised on CBS and Fox, which primarily carry games of AFC and NFC teams respectively (the conference of the away team generally determines the broadcaster of an inter-conference game). Nationally televised regular season games on Sunday and Monday nights have aired on NBC and ESPN, respectively, since 2006. ABC has also aired selected ESPN-produced regular season games since 2020. In addition, a "flexible scheduling" policy allows the league to reschedule select Sunday afternoon and Sunday night games to different time slots and/or reassign them to different networks regardless of conference in the second half of the season. Since the 2023 season, select Monday night and Thursday Night games are now also subject to flexible scheduling. During the postseason, ESPN/ABC airs two or three games, NBC airs two–four games, while CBS and Fox air the rest of the AFC and NFC games, respectively. The Super Bowl is currently rotated annually among CBS, Fox, NBC and ESPN/ABC.

With games airing on CBS, Fox, NBC and ESPN/ABC, the NFL thus holds broadcast contracts with four companies (Skydance Corporation, Fox Corporation, Comcast and The Walt Disney Company (majority ownership, with Hearst Communications and the league owning the remaining ownership of ESPN, LLC) that control a combined vast majority of the country's television product. These four broadcasters paid a combined total of US$110 billion to air games from 2023 to 2033. They previously paid a combined total of $39.6 billion to air games between 2014 and 2022.

NFL preseason telecasts are more in line with the other major sports leagues' regular-season telecasts: preseason telecasts are more locally produced, usually by a network affiliate of one of the above terrestrial television networks. Some preseason games will air nationally, however. Under the NFL's anti-siphoning rules for cable games, these stations usually will air simulcasts of ESPN and/or NFL Network games in their local markets if the local team is playing.

== Overview of schedule ==
The NFL regular season begins in the second weekend in September (the weekend after Labor Day in the United States) and ends in mid-January. Each team plays 17 games during an 18-week period. Typically, the majority of each week's games are played on Sunday afternoon. The Sunday afternoon games are televised regionally, where the particular game available on local television will depend on where the viewer is located, and begin at either 1:00 p.m., 4:05 p.m., or 4:25 p.m. Eastern Time. In addition, there are usually single nationally televised games each on Thursday night, Sunday night, and Monday night (most weeks). These primetime games are broadcast across the country over one national over-the-air broadcast, cable network (or one broadcast and one cable network for MNF Split DH), or streaming service, where there are no regional restrictions, nor any other competing NFL contest.

All playoff games, the Super Bowl and the Pro Bowl are held on either Saturday, Sunday or Monday in January and February, and in either the afternoon or primetime. These are also treated like primetime regular season games, televised across the country over a national network or streaming service with no regional restrictions or any other competing NFL game.

Scheduling during the NFL preseason is more lenient in that most games usually start based on local time. Thus, games on the West Coast are usually played after 7:00 p.m. Pacific Time (10:00 p.m. Eastern Time). However, the handful of primetime, nationally televised preseason games are still played at approximately 8:30 p.m. Eastern Time.

== Current broadcasting contracts ==
Annual NFL Broadcast Revenue (U.S. dollars)
Logo(s)	Broadcast Partner	Contract Term	Annual Value	Ref
ESPN logo ABC logo	The Walt Disney Company (including ABC, ESPN, ESPN Deportes, NFL Network, NFL RedZone and ESPN DTC)	2022–33	$2.7 billion	
YouTube logo YouTube TV logo	Alphabet Inc. and Google (including YouTube (application and website) and YouTube TV)	2023–29	$2 billion	
	NFL Network (including NFL RedZone, now part of The Walt Disney Company including ABC, ESPN and ESPN DTC since 2026)	2025–32	$1.3 billion	
Fox Broadcasting Company logo Fox One logo	Fox Corporation (including Fox, Fox Deportes and Fox One)	2023–33	$2.2 billion	
CBS logo Paramount+ logo	Skydance Corporation (including CBS and Paramount+)	2023–33	$2.1 billion	
NBC logo Peacock logo Telemundo logo Universo logo	Comcast (including NBC, Telemundo/Universo and Peacock)	2023–33	$2 billion	
Amazon Prime Video logo Twitch logo	Amazon (including Prime Video and Twitch)	2022–33	$1 billion	
	Cumulus Media (including Westwood One Radio)	2022–present	TBA	
Netflix logo	Netflix	2026–29	TBA	

The television rights to the NFL are the most expensive rights of not only any American sport, but any American entertainment property.

The Super Bowl is typically the most watched television broadcast of the year. Four of Nielsen Media Research's top 10 programs of all time are Super Bowls. Networks have purchased a share of the broadcasting rights to the NFL as a means of raising the entire network's profile.

The NFL distributes television revenue (as well as all revenue from League sponsorship and licensing deals, and 34% of all gate receipts) to all teams equally, regardless of performance. As of February 2019 each team receives $255 million annually from the league's television contracts, up 150% from $99.9 million in 2010. Under the current television contracts, which began during the 2022 season, regular season games are broadcast on seven networks: Prime Video, CBS, Fox, NBC, ESPN/ABC and the NFL Network. As of July 2023 national media revenue made up around 67% of the league's total football-related revenue according to Forbes.

Since the 2012 NFL season, the major networks have invested more in audio description due to FCC guidelines ramping up the requirements of opening up the second audio program audio channel to access audio description, which is also used by some networks to provide Spanish language audio of their primetime programming. Therefore, all of the NFL's broadcasting partners have added Spanish language audio commentary of games, either through a separate channel or over the SAP channel.

ESPN simulcasts Monday Night Football with Spanish-language commentary and graphics over ESPN Deportes and has since the move of MNF to ESPN in 2006, though its ABC simulcasts of games do carry the ESPN Deportes commentary over SAP on ABC. In 2017 and 2018, the Spanish-language coverage was also simulcast on ESPN2 during the first two months of the season. In the 2020-21 playoffs and every playoffs since, ESPN Deportes also aired an AFC Divisional Playoff game and the AFC Championship Game.

NBC's sister Spanish-language cable network mun2 (which rebranded as Universo in 2015) began to simulcast select Sunday Night Football games in the 2014 season as part of the new television contract, while its Spanish-language counterpart Telemundo Deportes provides the branding for NBC's SAP Spanish commentary.

Fox's Spanish-language sports network Fox Deportes began broadcasting select Fox games, including the playoffs and Super Bowl XLVIII in Spanish during the 2013 season. Super Bowl LI for Fox featured Spanish audio exclusive to Fox Deportes, without a SAP component over-the-air.

CBS, which lacked any Spanish language outlets prior to the 2019 remerger (Trés is legally part of the family, but is a cable channel), still uses solely SAP for its Spanish simulcasts. It relied on ESPN Deportes to simulcast Super Bowl 50, LIII and LV in Spanish, though it still carried Spanish SAP audio on the CBS broadcast of the game.

NFL finished new contract negotiations for its media rights deals for $110 billion over 11 years on March 18, 2021. In the new contracts, ABC became eligible to air the Super Bowl for the first time since Super Bowl XL in 2006. Since the 2023 NFL Season, ESPN/ABC has televised a wild-card game and a divisional playoff game, and flexible scheduling was added to Monday Night Football for Week 12 and beyond.

In 2022, Amazon Prime Video became the first streaming service to own full rights over a package of NFL games when it became the new home for Thursday Night Football.

In 2024, Netflix initially signed a three-year deal to exclusively two Christmas games. In 2026, Netflix signed a four-year extension to its original three-year deal, adding more games to its schedule.

2026 also saw ESPN acquire NFL Network, television distribution rights to NFL RedZone and the RedZone brand. In exchange, the league received a 10 percent equity stake in ESPN.

These current deals have an opt-out clause after the 2029 season, with the exception for ESPN/ABC's contract, whose opt-out clause is after the 2030 season.

In September 2026, NFL Commissioner Roger Goodell said the league was evaluating whether to repackage its existing media-rights packages in response to changes in how fans consume games, including the growth of streaming. The NFL has an option to revisit its current packages after the 2029-30 season.

== Sunday regional games ==
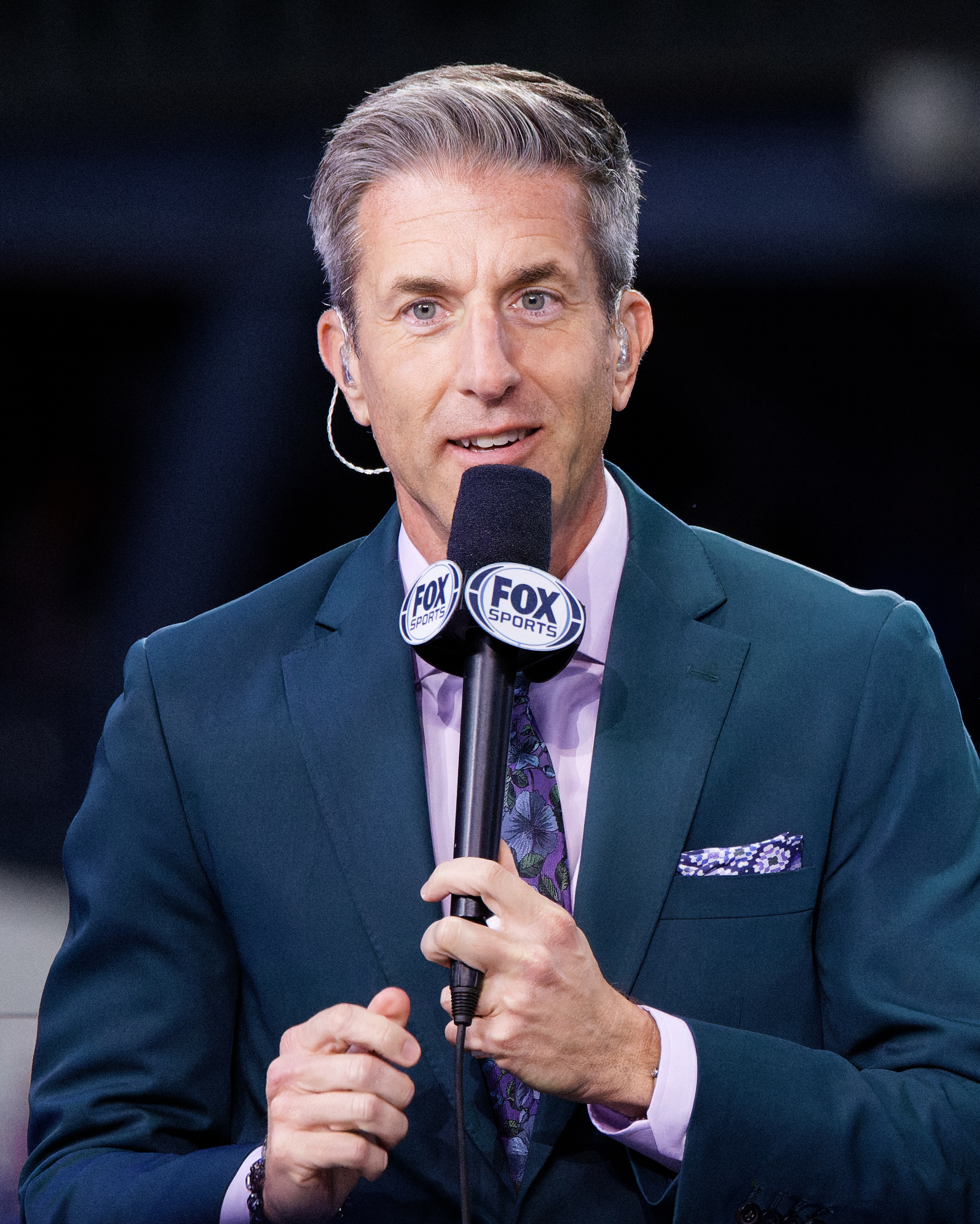
Jim Nantz (left), lead announcer of the NFL on CBS and Kevin Burkhardt (right), lead announcer of the NFL on Fox.

=== AFC and NFC packages ===
In 1970, the regional Sunday games (1 p.m. "early" and 4:05/4:25 p.m. "late" games Eastern time) were split into AFC and NFC packages. Each package was held by a single network: CBS had held the AFC package since 1998, and Fox had held the NFC package since 1994. These packages included Sunday afternoon games during each week of the regular season, a single game for each network on Thanksgiving, wild card playoff games, divisional playoff games, and the respective conference championship game for each network.

Starting in 2023, the league introduced greater scheduling flexibility, including cross-flexing regular season games between CBS and Fox and new protection rules for key matchups. As a result, Sunday afternoon games in both time slots are no longer allotted to a single network by conference affiliation, and the distribution of "high profile" games between CBS and Fox has become more or less balanced.

=== Classification as A, B, or C games ===
The Sunday games are classified as "A", "B", or "C" games. "A" games are usually the primary game for each network (1:00 ET for Eastern and Central time zone or 4:05 ET for Mountain and Pacific time zone games in a single-game week), and if the network has a doubleheader, is typically the 4:25 ET game. "B" games are typically the primary 1:00 ET game when the network has a doubleheader, or the secondary game if the network has a single game. "C" games are only shown in the participating teams' markets, and in some cases, markets where the game may be of interest to a local audience (due to playoff implications, rivalries, or a locally popular player/coach).

Market size and team success are significant factors in the classification of games. For example, Green Bay has a population of 105,000, one of the smallest for a city with a professional sports team. However, the Green Bay Packers usually have the "A" or "B" game because of their long history and almost unparalleled success (the Packers actually have two primary markets, with Milwaukee being the other primary market for the team; before 1995, the team played selected games in Milwaukee, including an NFL Championship Game held in the infield of the Milwaukee Mile). The Dallas Cowboys (due to that team's national popularity regardless of on-field play) and a team or player that has had recent success (multiple examples) have typically been shown in the national doubleheader time slot for ratings purposes, despite affiliate requests to show a team that may have more appeal locally; these games are typically decided by the NFL and CBS or Fox, depending on who has the doubleheader that week.

=== Interconference games ===
For interconference games, the visiting team generally determines which network is assigned for the game: an AFC team at NFC team game is typically assigned to CBS, and an NFC at AFC game is generally given to Fox. This allows both Fox and CBS affiliates in a team's primary market to carry games from the team during the season.

After a Broncos-Vikings game was moved to Fox in 2011 because of Fox having a lack of games as a result of an NFL flexible scheduling policy (see below), the NFL permanently instituted a "cross-flex" policy in 2014, allowing Fox games to be moved to CBS and CBS games moved to Fox.

On occasion, both of a team's home interconference games are played in prime time, depriving the opposite conference's network of any games involving the team. This happened in 1978 to the Los Angeles Rams, 1990 to the Indianapolis Colts, 1992 to the Houston Oilers, 1993 to both the Buffalo Bills and San Diego Chargers, 1997 and 2003 to the Miami Dolphins, 1999 to the New England Patriots, 2005 to the Baltimore Ravens, 2013 to the Atlanta Falcons, and 2015 to the Arizona Cardinals. In the 1997 Dolphins' case, their home game against the Chicago Bears had been initially slated for Fox, but was moved to Monday night due to Game 7 of the World Series that was played on Sunday night. In the 2015 Cardinals' case, their home game against the Cincinnati Bengals had been initially slated for CBS, but was moved to Sunday night on NBC via flexible scheduling which marks the first time since 1997 that a team's home interconference game was moved to primetime after their other interconference game was already scheduled for primetime.

The 2016 Arizona Cardinals, 2018 Detroit Lions, 2019 New Orleans Saints, 2020 New York Giants, 2021 New Orleans Saints, 2024 Houston Texans, 2024 Kansas City Chiefs, and 2024 Pittsburgh Steelers, and 2026 Denver Broncos also had both their home interconference games in prime time, but aired at least once on the opposing network regardless: the Cardinals appeared on Thursday Night Football in Week 5 at the San Francisco 49ers, the Lions appeared in their traditional Thanksgiving Day game against the Chicago Bears, and the others had at least one game crossflexed from the opposing network.

The Seattle Seahawks did not appear on NBC in their inaugural season of 1976, nor did the Tampa Bay Buccaneers in 1977, despite neither playing a single prime time game. In 1976, Seattle played in the NFC West and played their sole interconference game at Tampa Bay (thus on CBS), whereas, in 1977, the teams swapped conferences, so Tampa Bay played in the NFC Central and played their sole interconference game at Seattle (thus on CBS). Seattle would later return to the NFC West in 2002.

In addition to the above, a few teams prior to the 2002 realignment had their sole home interconference game played in prime time. From 1970–2001, this happened in 1972 to the Miami Dolphins, 1982 to the Detroit Lions, Buffalo Bills and Houston Oilers, 1987 to the Miami Dolphins and Dallas Cowboys, 1991 to the Minnesota Vikings and 2001 to the Jacksonville Jaguars. Additionally, the aforementioned 1972 Miami Dolphins, the only NFL team to complete a perfect season, did not appear on CBS; their lone interconference home game vs. the St. Louis Cardinals was broadcast on Monday Night Football, and Super Bowl VII was broadcast by NBC.

In addition, the team's home stadium would not make an appearance on either CBS or Fox due to interconference home games being crossflexed; this happened in 2016 to the Oakland Raiders, 2018 to the Tampa Bay Buccaneers, 2019 to both the Los Angeles Rams and Los Angeles Chargers, 2020 to the San Francisco 49ers, 2021 to the Tennessee Titans, 2023 to the Los Angeles Chargers, 2024 to the San Francisco 49ers and Buffalo Bills, and 2026 to the Dallas Cowboys. Both interconference and intraconference games may be cross-flexed to protect both networks.

=== Doubleheaders and single games ===
Three games (with some contractual exceptions, see below) are broadcast in any one market each Sunday morning/afternoon, with one network being allocated a "doubleheader" each week:

- A 1:00 p.m. ET (12:00 p.m. CT or 10:00 a.m. PT) "early" game and a 4:25 p.m. ET (3:25 p.m. CT or 1:25 p.m. PT) "late" game

While the other network broadcasts either:

- A 1:00 p.m. ET (12:00 p.m. CT or 10:00 a.m. PT) game, or
- A 4:05 p.m. ET (3:05 p.m. CT or 1:05 p.m. PT) game

==== Start times ====
Since 1998, early games have the precise, official start time of 1:01 p.m. ET, which allows for one network commercial and the NFL broadcast copyright teaser animation. However, game times are generally advertised simply as 1 p.m. starts. In addition, the league revised the late games to start at 4:05 p.m. ET if it was the only game televised by the network that week and to begin at 4:15 p.m. ET (moved to 4:25 p.m. ET in 2012) if it was part of a doubleheader. The additional 20 (10 prior to 2012) minutes for doubleheaders allowed the early games extra time to be shown to completion, and avoid continuing past the late game's scheduled kickoff. For single games, the start of 5 minutes past the hour allows the network time for a short introduction (as three hours had passed since the pre-game show has aired) and one commercial break before kickoff. In those cases, there is no need to avoid early-game overlap as there is no early game shown. In addition, it allows those games to end earlier. This is especially important for CBS, which wants to air 60 Minutes at 7 p.m. ET/6 p.m. CT, or as close to that time as possible, in Eastern and Central time markets which receive only a single late game.

==== Time zone rules ====
Sunday afternoon games in the Mountain and Pacific time zones are always scheduled for 2:05 or 2:25 p.m. Mountain Time and 1:05 or 1:25 p.m. Pacific Time. No games before 12:00 p.m. MT (2 p.m. ET) are ever scheduled, partly to avoid conflict with religious services in those cities; Denver had three noon MT kickoffs at Mile High Stadium late in the 1972 season, but the experiment was never repeated.

==== Doubleheader allotments ====
Beginning with the introduction of the 17-game season, Fox and CBS each have eight doubleheader weeks during the season between weeks 2 and 17 with both networks having the doubleheader for weeks 1 and 18 (In 2024 and 2025 those weeks were changed to weeks 15 and 18). These are not necessarily alternating weeks; one network may have two or rarely three or four consecutive doubleheaders (this only occurs when one network has doubleheader weeks 2 and 3 after both networks had the doubleheader in week 1; in weeks 16 and 17; and then both networks have doubleheaders week 18 or in the 2024 case a single network having it in weeks 15–18, with both networks having it in weeks 15 and 18). This happened to CBS in 2018 and Fox in 2019.

Fox requests to carry a doubleheader on a Sunday that it airs a Major League Baseball League Championship Series or World Series game if a Sunday game is being played (typically Game 2, 5 or 7 for the World Series and Game 1 for the League Championship Series) and uses the featured 4:25 game as a lead-in for the baseball playoffs (though in 1996, 2001, 2005, 2014, 2019, 2020, and all years since 2022 Fox did not have a doubleheader on the day it broadcast the World Series, as there was no Sunday World Series game due to expansion of the MLB postseason). Since 2022, Fox instead requests that Game 1 of its respective League Championship Series would air in this post-NFL slot.

During weeks 1 and 18, both networks are given doubleheaders; this has been the case since 2021 for week 1 and 2006 for the final week of the regular season. From 1990 through 2005, one network received nine doubleheaders during the 17-week season, and the other network received eight (except 1993, when CBS and NBC each received nine in an 18-week regular season).

Doubleheader allotments were often assigned with restrictions because of other network commitments. This happened during Finals Sunday of the U.S. Open tennis championships (September) (CBS, week 1 1976, '82, '85–'87, '89–'90, '99 and again 2001–2014; week 2 1979–81, '83–'84, '88, '91–93, '98, '00), or Major League Baseball playoffs in October (NBC, typically during League Championship Series from 1976 to 1989, and again in 1996 and 1997, World Series 1978 to 1984, when Sunday games were afternoon games, CBS, League Championship Series, 1990 to 1993 and Fox, League Division Series 2001 and League Championship Series from 2002 to 2006 and again in 2012). During these weeks, the restricted conference's teams in the Mountain and Pacific time zones could not play at home during the weekend in question, unless they either hosted an interconference game or were scheduled in prime time (regardless of opponent). The rule was effectively eliminated by the new cross-flex rule in 2014, meaning the NFL could apply the new rule and assign games that would be on the restricted network to the other network. In 1991 (Charleston, South Carolina market) and 1995 (Rochester, New York market), NBC did not allow their games to be played in the early slot (1:00 p.m. ET) in order to cover the final day of matches in golf's Ryder Cup (no restrictions in 1993 because the matches would end before 5:30 p.m. local time, or 12:30 p.m. ET).

Due to the COVID-19 pandemic in 2020, the league had to accommodate similar broadcasting conflicts when two men's major golf championships were postponed to the fall. The league gave Fox one late game in Week 2, Washington Football Team at Arizona Cardinals, to allow viewers to see the conclusion of the U.S. Open on Fox Sports 1 September 20. Rights to the golf tournament were later transferred to NBC, whose single primetime window for football rendered the point moot. Similarly with the final round of The Masters rescheduled for November 15, CBS was not given any early games in Week 10.

=== NFL Sunday Ticket and NFL RedZone ===
NFL Sunday Ticket is a subscription-based package that allows out of market regional games to be watched in full. Due to contractual reasons, national and in-market games are unavailable on the service. Sunday Ticket is also typically subject to the same blackout rules as local broadcasts. Starting with the 2023 NFL regular season, YouTube TV and YouTube Primetime Channels, will offer NFL Sunday Ticket. It will be exclusive to YouTube in the US and available on streaming devices, mobile apps, smart TVs, as well as most web browsers. Satellite broadcast company DirecTV previously offered Sunday Ticket from the inception of the product in 1994 until the end of the 2022 regular season.

In Canada, NFL Sunday Ticket is available via the streaming service DAZN and traditional cable and satellite providers.

A similar service is generally available on NFL GamePass (distributed by DAZN since 2023) outside of the US, China and Canada. Blackout and other restrictions vary on an individual country basis due to network exclusivities.

NFL RedZone is a premium network featuring whip-around coverage of regular season Sunday afternoon games in progress. The channel prides itself on showing "every touchdown from every game" using simulcasts from the relevant CBS and FOX feeds. It is available on many cable, streaming, and satellite providers in the United States, as well as several international services.

== Sunday local market policies ==
Regular season Sunday afternoon games aired on CBS and Fox are distributed to affiliates by means of regional coverage. Each individual game is only broadcast to selected media markets. The NFL imposes several television and blackout policies to maximize ratings and optimize stadium attendances.

=== Primary markets ===
Several factors determine which games are carried in each market. Each of the 32 NFL teams is assigned a "primary market" which is the metropolitan area where the club is located. Most teams also have a selected number of secondary markets. Secondary markets - which are almost exclusively non-NFL cities and towns - can be of any size, and are typically defined by an area where any part of the market falls within 75 miles of an NFL stadium. Small markets that have no clubs tend to strongly associate with geographically nearby or particularly relevant teams, but may fall outside of a 100-mile radius, are not necessarily an officially designated secondary markets by the NFL. Generally, games are aired in the primary and secondary markets as follows:

- All away games are aired in the primary and secondary markets. This is a gesture to old policies based on the ability for fans to attend games. Away games were looked upon as too difficult to travel to and attend.
- All sold-out home games are aired in the primary market. Through the 2014 season but not since, games that did not sell out at least 72 hours prior to kickoff were subject to local blackout in the primary and all secondary markets. (see below)

=== Restrictions on other games when local team is playing ===
The NFL rules have traditionally prohibited other NFL games from being shown on local television stations while a local team is playing a sold out, locally televised home game. Under these rules, when the home team is being shown on the network with the NFL single game, the doubleheader station can only air one of its games. When this happens, there are only two games shown locally. However, when the home team is being shown on the network with the doubleheader, all three games can still air in the same market.

The rule was designed to encourage ticket-holders to show up at the stadium instead of watching another game on television. However, each network was guaranteed to have at least one game broadcast in every market, so some exceptions are granted to this rule, typically when one of the two Sunday game networks has a 1:00 p.m. or 4:30 p.m. live non-NFL event, such as golf, tennis, baseball, or drag racing.

Since 2014, this rule has not applied in the last week of the season when both CBS and Fox have the doubleheader, so all markets receive four games that week. In 2019, this rule was loosened as a one-year test, allowing each market to air three games in some weeks regardless if the local team is playing at home. By 2022, teams were required to allow the doubleheader network to counter-program against their singleheader network home games at least twice per season; as of 2025, teams must allow four such competing telecasts, meaning that only five teams had enough 2025 home games scheduled in single-game network windows to impose any such blackouts. If none of the teams impose any such blackouts, 2025 will be the first season to not have a single blackout.

Prior to the 2000 season, doubleheader rules were much more restrictive. Pre-2000, only one game from each network could be aired in a market where a home game was played, even if the home game was on the doubleheader network. Therefore, markets with two teams (such as New York) rarely got more than two games, since odds were that one of the two teams would be at home on any given Sunday. Consequently, the Jets or Giants were often scheduled on Saturday in the final two weeks of the season to free up Sunday for the other New York team.

=== Mid-game switches ===
During the afternoon games, CBS and Fox may switch a market's game to a more competitive one mid-game, particularly when a game becomes one-sided. For this to occur, one team must be ahead by at least 18 points in the second half.

Due to the controversial 1968 "Heidi Game" incident on NBC, a primary media market must show its local team's game in its entirety and secondary markets usually follow suit for away games. Also, for home games secondary markets or any others where one team's popularity stands out may request a constant feed of that game, and in that case will not be switched.

If the local team is scheduled for the late game of a doubleheader, it has importance over any early game. If 4:25 p.m. arrives, and the early game has not concluded, the primary affiliate (home and road games) and secondary affiliates (road games only) are required to cut off the early game and switch to the start of the local team's game. Additional affiliates, including secondary affiliates for home games, may also request to pull out of an early game for a nearby team's late start. This is common in Texas, where many affiliates which are not considered secondary markets by the NFL still switch out of early games in order to get to the start of a 4:25 p.m. Dallas Cowboys game.

When a local team plays the early game of a doubleheader, that game holds importance over any late game. If the local team's early game runs beyond 4:25 p.m., the primary and secondary markets stay with it until completion. In those cases, the late game is simply joined in-progress.

=== Shared media markets ===
For this reason, if two teams share a primary media market, their games are never scheduled on the same network on the same day (unless they play each other). Otherwise, the networks could theoretically have to cut away from one team's game to show the other. Since 2020, two pairs of teams are affected by this rule, and are subject to additional rules described below:

- The New York Giants and New York Jets
- The Los Angeles Rams and Los Angeles Chargers

==== Chargers and Rams ====
The Los Angeles Chargers and Los Angeles Rams gained shared-market status after the Rams returned to Los Angeles (from St. Louis) in 2016, followed by the Chargers (from San Diego) in 2017. After playing in separate stadiums from 2017 to 2019, they began sharing SoFi Stadium in 2020.

- Every season, the Chargers and the Rams play at least 22 combined games which cannot be scheduled in the Sunday early time slot because they and most of their respective AFC West and NFC West rivals are in the Pacific and Mountain time zones: nine home games for one team and eight home games for the other; the Chargers' away games at Denver and Las Vegas; and the Rams' away games at Arizona, San Francisco, and Seattle.
- During seasons in which the AFC West and NFC West play each other, this count increases to 24 or 25 total games. In addition to the games listed above, the Chargers will have two inter-conference away games in the Mountain or Pacific Time Zones and the Rams will have one or two such games (depending on whether their game against Kansas City, in which they are located in the Central Time Zone, is away). However, one of these games is a head-to-head matchup between the two teams.
- During seasons in which the 17th game features an AFC West team at an NFC West team, this count increases to 23 games unless the Chargers and Rams play head-to-head in this game.
- The Rams' two interconference home games (with a visiting AFC team) are televised by CBS, and the Chargers' interconference home games (with a visiting NFC team) are on Fox, unless they are scheduled in prime time or are cross-flexed. This also limits the broadcast opportunities for the other team's game.
- When the Chargers and the Rams played in separate stadiums from 2017 to 2019, there were several times that both teams played late games on Sunday (including Week 2 of 2017 when both were at home), each of different networks. Whenever this happened, the must-show rule beat out the exclusivity rule, resulting in both games being shown in the Los Angeles area at the same time. Although both teams now share SoFi Stadium, they can still play late games at the same time on Sunday, only that one of them can be at home. On weeks both teams play home games, the other game is played either on Thursday or Monday night.

For the 2017 season, the NFL arranged four weeks in which one network would carry both the Rams and Chargers in separate time slots while the other had the rights to a doubleheader, thus giving the Los Angeles market four games in those weeks. Fox split its coverage between its two Los Angeles stations, KTTV and MyNetworkTV affiliate KCOP-TV. Likewise, CBS split between KCBS-TV and sister station KCAL-TV. These instances required cross-flexing of one NFC game (the Rams hosted the Seattle Seahawks in Week 5 on CBS) and one AFC game (the Chargers hosted the Buffalo Bills on Fox in Week 11).

==== Giants and Jets ====
The New York Giants and New York Jets began sharing the New York City market after the Jets began play in 1960. Both teams played at Giants Stadium from 1984 to 2009 and MetLife Stadium since 2010.

Originally, the league almost never scheduled the Giants and the Jets to play their games at the same time. The league first allowed exceptions during the 2009 season due to unusual scheduling logistics. These exceptions marked the first times since the 1984 season that the Giants and Jets played games simultaneously. In the 2017 season, the teams were scheduled for the same time slot five times.

- The aforementioned Chargers and Rams' late time slot requirement does not exist for the Giants and Jets. Since all NFC East and AFC East teams are either in the Eastern or Central time zones, most of their games can be played in either the early 1:00 p.m. or the late 4:05 p.m./4:25 p.m. time slots.
- However, it is still impossible for both New York teams to play home games on the same day, because they share MetLife Stadium. Therefore, the same conflict still exists.
  - As an example aversion, in 2016, the Jets hosted the Seattle Seahawks and Los Angeles Rams. The former game was scheduled during the same week in which the Giants played the Minnesota Vikings on Monday Night Football, while the latter game was scheduled during the same week in which the Giants played the Cincinnati Bengals on Monday Night Football. Conversely, the Giants' other interconference home game, vs. the Baltimore Ravens, was scheduled during the same week in which the Jets played on Monday Night Football.

Week 14 of the 2021 season initially had one instance in which Fox held the rights to both the Jets and Giants games despite CBS having the doubleheader (the Jets hosted New Orleans at 1:00 p.m., while the Giants played at the Los Angeles Chargers for a 4:05 p.m. contest). In such an instance, Fox would likely have split coverage between its New York properties, WNYW and WWOR-TV. However, the NFL later crossflexed the Saints-Jets game to CBS.

==== Primary/secondary market conflicts ====
Although in close proximity, the Washington Commanders and Baltimore Ravens are served by separate media markets, and so they can play at the same time and even on the same network. If both teams play at the same time on opposite networks with at least one at home, both games have aired in each market on a few occasions. Because Washington D.C. is an official secondary market for the Ravens but Baltimore is not an official secondary market for the Commanders, most cases involve a Ravens away game being aired in Washington opposite a Commanders home game.

In 2016, the same rule applied in Los Angeles, as Los Angeles was a primary market for the Rams and a secondary market for the Chargers (as the team was still playing in San Diego). However, no Chargers away games were scheduled opposite Rams home games.

==== Rams and Raiders in Los Angeles (1982–94) ====
When the Rams and Raiders shared the Los Angeles market from 1982 to 1994, the NFL was more lenient on its shared media markets policies, frequently scheduling home games for both teams at the same time; this was possible as the Rams and Raiders did not share the same stadium (Anaheim Stadium for the Rams, Los Angeles Memorial Coliseum for the Raiders). For example, during Week 17 of the 1994 season, their last respective home games in Los Angeles, both the Washington Redskins at Rams and Kansas City Chiefs at Raiders games were played at 1 p.m. PT. Likewise, the late Sunday afternoon games during Week 11 of the 1993 season included both the Kansas City Chiefs at the Raiders and Atlanta Falcons at the Rams. Both the Rams and Raiders usually had trouble selling out their respective stadiums during their time in Los Angeles; thus, their home games were frequently blacked out in the market anyway.

==== 49ers and Raiders in the San Francisco Bay Area (1960–1981 and 1995–2019) ====
When the 49ers and Raiders shared the Bay Area market from 1960 to 1981 and again from 1995 to 2019, originally the teams were typically not scheduled at the same time. To alleviate conflicts, both teams were scheduled for at least one prime time game, regardless of their records during the previous season.

In 2010, with the Broncos–49ers game being played in London, England during Week 8 of that season, the game occurred in the early time slot, something that would have been prohibited had the game been played in San Francisco. This allowed the Raiders to host the Seahawks on that day, marking the first time the 49ers played on CBS and the Raiders played on Fox on the same day, though the Raiders game was blacked out locally.

Starting in 2012, there were a number of times that the Raiders and 49ers both played late games on Sunday, often during Week 17. Whenever this happened, the must-show rule trumped the exclusivity rule, resulting in both games being shown in the Bay Area at the same time.

After the Raiders moved to Las Vegas in 2020, the schedule continues to be made so that the 49ers and Raiders are never scheduled to play at the same time on the same network so that all Raiders games can continue to air in the Bay Area market. With the Bay Area no longer being a shared market, it is now possible for one team to play the early game followed by the other team playing the late game on the doubleheader network.

=== Bonus coverage ===
When a media market's regionally televised game ends before the others, the network (CBS or Fox) may switch to "bonus coverage" of the ending of another game. However, the league imposes two restrictions that are designed to maximize the ratings of the late games on the doubleheader network, which tend to record the most NFL viewers during the day, often beating the audience for Sunday night games (these rules were changed in 2019, along with the singleheader rule, in an effort to keep viewers watching for longer periods of time.).

First, bonus coverage offered after any early time slot games cannot be shown past the start of the late time slot (either 4:25 ET for the doubleheader network or 4:05 ET for the single game network). This prevents people from continuing to watch the bonus coverage instead of seeing the beginning of the late doubleheader network's game (which is usually either their local team or the network's featured game). Networks may show highlights of the game and usually will at the earliest opportunity. The network broadcasting the single game will sometimes show each play as soon as it ends as part of its post-game show. A station originally getting the game featured during bonus coverage will stay with it unless it is leaving to show a local team. In the local markets of the second doubleheader game, networks sometimes split screen the local game to show critical portions of the first doubleheader game (with FOX airing it under "Double Coverage" on-air).

Second, bonus coverage cannot be shown after a late game on the single-game network because it will run in opposition to the ending of the late doubleheader network's game (the late doubleheader network is allowed to air bonus coverage since it's aired in every market) and Football Night in America. However, the single-game network usually schedules most of its top games in the early 1:00 ET time slot (except for west coast teams' home games, and possibly either a Giants or Jets game), and most weeks only one late single game are scheduled so this does not tend to be a major issue.

If the doubleheader network's games all finish before 7:30 ET, it is supposed to conclude the post-game show within 10 minutes to protect FNIA. If any games finish after 7:30, the post-game program can run until 8 ET. However, this restriction seems to apply to game footage only; on several occasions Fox has run its post-game offering to 8:00, despite all games ending before 7:30, by airing only panel discussions and interviews in the latter portion of the show. On the other hand, CBS rarely airs any post-game show after its doubleheaders or 4:05 single-games. This is because 60 Minutes is one of its signature shows, and CBS makes every effort to start it as close to 7 or 7:30 — its traditional airtime — as possible.

== National games ==
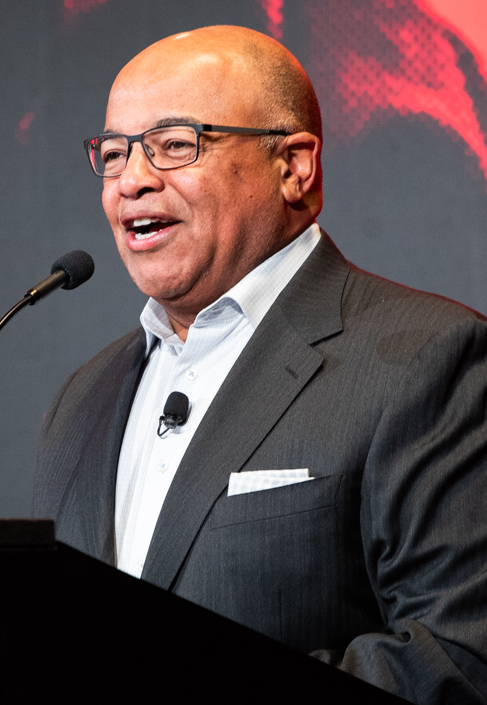
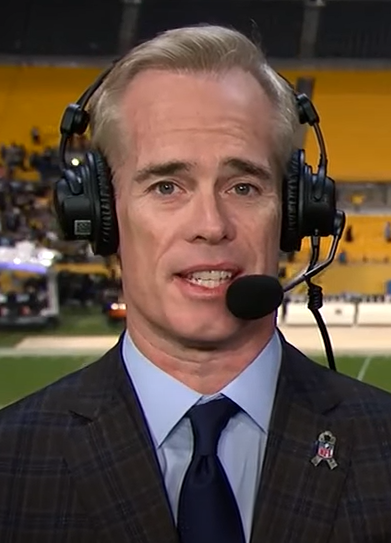
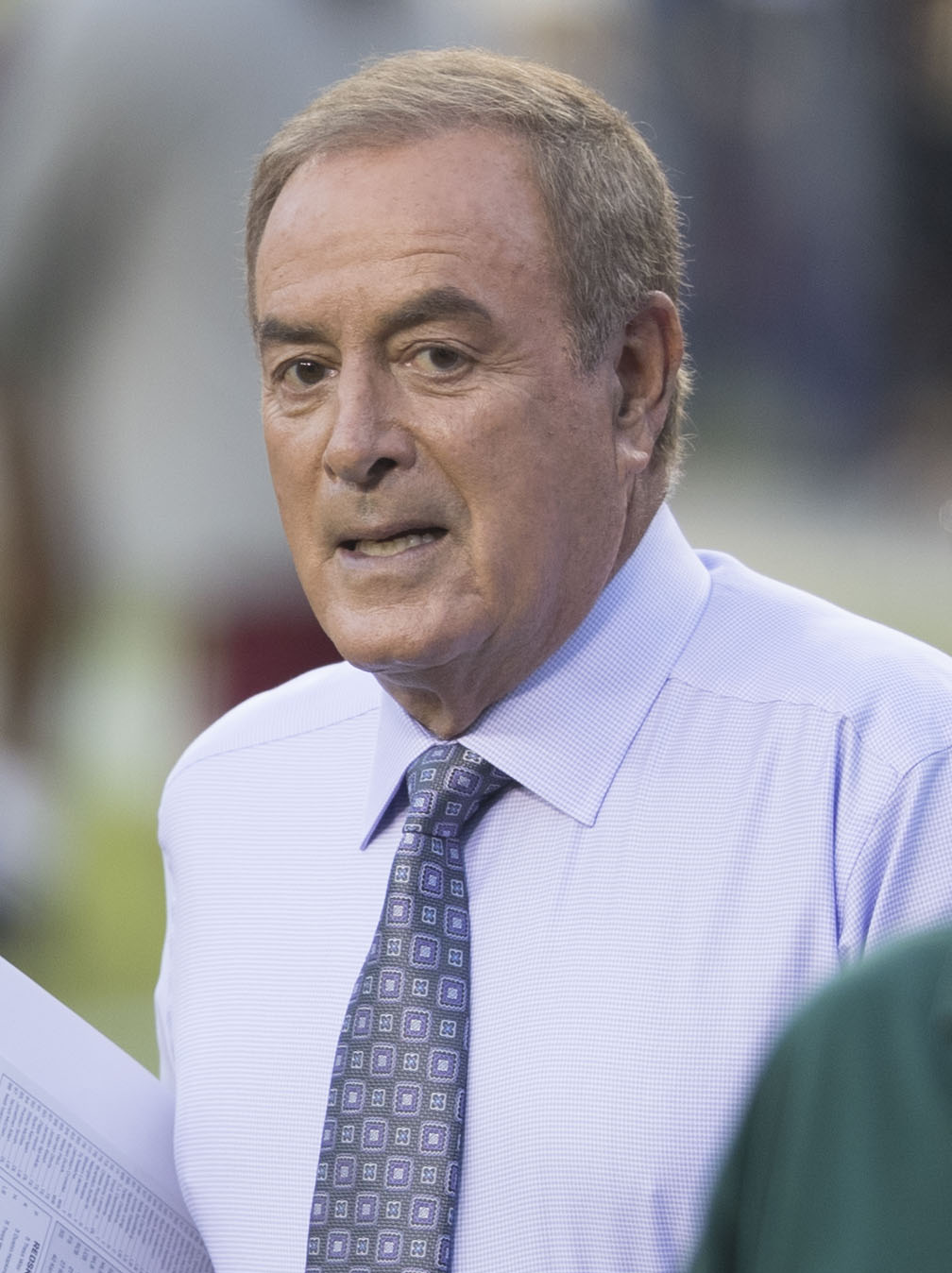
Mike Tirico (left), lead announcer of NBC's Sunday Night Football, Joe Buck (center), lead announcer of ESPN/ABC's Monday Night Football and Al Michaels (right), lead announcer of Prime Video's Thursday Night Football.

National broadcasts of marquee matches occur on Thursday, Sunday and Monday nights. NBC has broadcast rights to the opening night kickoff game and to the Sunday night games. These are televised under a special "flexible schedule" that allows Sunday afternoon games to be moved to prime-time beginning with Week 5 of the season.

=== Sunday Night Football ===
NBC has broadcast the marquee "game of the week" nationally since 2006. Before 2006, the "game of the week" was considered to be Monday Night Football on ABC. However, ESPN previously aired games on Sunday nights from 1987 to 2005, and TNT aired games from 1990 to 1997.

=== Thursday night games ===
Since 2012, a Thursday night game went into effect during every week of the season with the exception of the final week. Each game is aired on the NFL Network (prior to 2021) or Amazon Prime Video (2022 and on), with the exceptions of the Week 1 NFL Kickoff and Thanksgiving Day games, which are aired on NBC. The season-kickoff game for the 2012 season was moved up a day — to a Wednesday, in order to avoid conflict with President Barack Obama's speech at the Democratic National Convention. Since the NFL tries to avoid scheduling Thursday night games during the season which would require the visiting team to travel more than one time zone (excluding the Week 1 Kickoff), the five teams in the Pacific Time Zone — the Las Vegas Raiders, Los Angeles Chargers, Los Angeles Rams, San Francisco 49ers and Seattle Seahawks — would have more limited scheduling options in years that the AFC West and NFC West divisions don't face each other in interconference play. There have been some notable exceptions: the Kansas City Chiefs, who are based in the Central Time Zone, have played both the Chargers and Raiders on Thursdays; the Rams, who were based in St. Louis until 2015, played against the 49ers in 2013. Since TNF started in 2012, the Dallas Cowboys of the Central Time Zone have occasionally hosted clubs from the Pacific Time Zone on Thanksgiving Day: Dallas hosted the Oakland Raiders in 2013, the Los Angeles Chargers in 2017, and hosted the Las Vegas Raiders in 2021. The Detroit Lions, of the Eastern Time Zone, have not hosted a Mountain or Pacific Time Zone team during this time. Each year since 2014, the Thursday Night game the week after Thanksgiving has featured two teams that played on Thanksgiving, effectively giving both teams a full week of practice rather than the short week that most teams have for a Thursday Night game.

In 2014, CBS had simulcast Thursday night games between Weeks 2–8 and televised one of two Saturday games in Week 16, and each Thursday night game was an intra-division game, except for the Packers–Seahawks Week 1 NBC kickoff and the Cowboys–Bears game in Week 14. The two Saturday games in Week 16 — Eagles–Redskins and Chargers–49ers — aired beginning at 4:30 p.m. ET. The 4:30 p.m. ET game was televised by the NFL Network, while the other began shortly after 8:00 p.m. ET, and aired on CBS.

=== Monday Night Football ===
Between 1970 and 1977, and again since 2003, there has been no Monday night game during the last week of the season. From 1978 until 2002, a season-ending Monday night game was scheduled. The 2003 revision permits the NFL to have all eight teams involved in the Wild Card playoffs to have equal time in preparation, instead of the possibility of one or two teams having a shorter preparation for their playoff game if they were picked to play on Saturday, instead of Sunday. This scenario, in which a team finishing its season on Monday night had a playoff game the following Saturday, never occurred.

Between 2006 and 2020, ESPN has opened the season with a Monday Night Football doubleheader, with a 7:00 p.m. game and a 10:30 p.m. both shown in their entirety nationwide. ESPN2 or ESPNEWS (only in 2012 because ESPN2 was airing an MLB game) started the second game if the game on ESPN was not over by the time the second game had started. However, in Week 1 of the 2018 season, the conclusion of the first game of the doubleheader, Jets–Lions, moved to ESPN2 in order to show the beginning of the Rams–Raiders game on ESPN.

Since 2020, select Monday Night Football games have been simulcast on ABC and ESPN2. While the ABC broadcast is a simulcast of the main ESPN feed, the ESPN2 feed have also featured alternate telecasts. The 2020 alternate telecast was hosted by Rece Davis and Kirk Herbstreit, while the current version, started in 2021, is hosted by Eli Manning and Peyton Manning and nicknamed the "Manningcast."

=== Local syndication of cable and streaming games and anti-siphoning ===
The NFL has an anti-siphoning regulation, where all games televised on cable or streaming air via broadcast syndication to an over-the-air station. This rule is to maximize television ratings, as well as to protect the NFL's ability to sell television rights collectively. The anti-siphoning rule does not apply to secondary markets. For example, Miami Dolphins games do not air on local stations in West Palm Beach. The only exception is the Green Bay Packers which have two primary markets, Green Bay and Milwaukee, a remnant of when they played some home games in Milwaukee each season.

Typically, the team's flagship station for the preseason games will hold such rights, as teams will usually sell the preseason, local non-broadcast television games as one package. This station does not need to have affiliate connections with a national broadcaster of NFL games.

For ESPN games, owned-and-operated stations of ABC and Hearst Television (even those Hearst stations not affiliated with ABC, and including their one independent station in the Tampa-St. Petersburg market) have first right of refusal, due to both ESPN and ABC's common ownership by The Walt Disney Company (Hearst holds a 20% stake in ESPN). In the past (until 2021), the ABC O&Os have passed on airing the game, opting instead to air ABC's Monday night schedule which includes the successful Dancing with the Stars.

Under the agreement for the 2014 season between CBS and the NFL Network for Thursday Night Football simulcasts during the first half of the season, CBS affiliates in the primary markets in question have the primary option to carry local games. If the CBS affiliate opts out of the deal, the NFL will offer the package by syndication, typically with the Monday Night package. The CBS/NFL Network deal was extended for the 2015 season on January 18, 2015.

For the 2016 season, two midseason TNF games were NFL Network-exclusive but produced by NBC; the NBC affiliates in those markets with teams competing had the primary option to carry those games in-market. With the 2018 move of the package to Fox, the two NFL Network-exclusive games produced by Fox actually varied between NBC and CBS affiliates, rather than being exclusive to the Fox stations in each market. Starting in 2022, the Amazon Prime Video subscription service will hold the rights to broadcast TNF and because of this, the NFL will continue to require these games to be syndicated to the team's local markets.

In other markets, stations that are the affiliates of MyNetworkTV or The CW (and, in at least one case, an independent station) have outbid more established local broadcasters in some markets. However, the home team's market must be completely served by the station airing the game (as opposed to a low-power station). With increasing consolidation of local broadcasters in the United States, larger station ownership groups (particularly Nexstar Media Group) have increasingly cornered the market for these simulcasts.

On November 8, 1987, the very first NFL game ever aired on ESPN was played between the New England Patriots and New York Giants. Technically, the game was only simulcast in the Boston market, with a separate broadcast produced for the New York market by ESPN sister property WABC-TV – at the time, WABC's union contract prohibited non-union workers (like those of ESPN) from working on live events broadcast on the station. This marked the only time since the AFL–NFL merger that a regular season game was locally produced for television. The WABC broadcast featured WABC's own Corey McPherrin doing play-by-play, and Frank Gifford and Lynn Swann from Monday Night Football doing color commentary (Gifford and Swann did not have to travel further for their Monday night game, which was Seahawks at Jets).

=== Saturday NFL games ===
Under the Sports Broadcasting Act of 1961, for the NFL to retain its antitrust exemption, professional games are not permitted to air on any television station within a 75-mile radius of any high school or college game from 6pm on Friday to midnight on Saturday evening until the second weekend of December; effectively, this prevents the NFL from scheduling any games on those days.

Since the 1970 AFL–NFL merger, the NFL has taken an informal approach to scheduling games on Saturdays after the end of the college football season, with the scheduling policy changing many times. From 1970 to 2005, both of the Sunday afternoon broadcast networks (CBS and NBC from 1970 to 1993, Fox and NBC from 1994 to 1997, and Fox and CBS from 1998 to 2005) were given at least two Saturday afternoon national broadcasts in December, with ESPN also airing one or two Saturday games in primetime from 1998 to 2005.

In 2006, the schedule was cut to three Saturday games, which aired in primetime and were televised on the NFL Network in December. In 2008, this was changed to only one Saturday game, still aired in primetime on the NFL Network, which was the policy through 2011. For the 2012 season, ESPN aired the lone Saturday game in primetime. No Saturday game was scheduled in 2013, the first and only time since the 1970 merger that the NFL did not play any regular season games on Saturday.

In 2014, the NFL returned to Saturdays with a Week 16 doubleheader, with the Saturday afternoon game airing on the NFL Network and a Saturday night game airing on CBS. CBS Sports produced coverage for both games. In 2015, this schedule was modified again to one Saturday night game during both Week 15 and Week 16, these games were cable-only and produced by CBS. In 2016, Christmas fell on a Sunday, so the regional slate of week 16 games aired on Saturday afternoon, with a national game also airing that night, along with a national week 15 Saturday game the previous week, with CBS and Fox producing the regional games and NBC producing the national games for cable.

Since 2018, NFL Network has exclusively aired three or four late-season Saturday games per season. When the schedule is released, five Sunday afternoon games in each of these weeks will be eligible to be moved to Saturday afternoon or evening. The games moving to Saturday are typically announced no later than four weeks prior to game day. Beginning in 2021, ESPN and ABC currently air a Saturday doubleheader during Week 18 featuring games with playoff implications.

The 2023 season featured eight Saturday regular season games (three in Weeks 15, two in Week 16, one in Week 17, and two in Week 18) making it the most Saturday games played in a season since 1970 (excluding years in which Christmas falls on Sunday, and thus the great majority of that week's games are moved to Saturday afternoon). The 2024 season featured a Saturday night triple header which started with Chargers and Patriots, followed by the Bengals taking on the Broncos, and concluded with a prime time matchup with the Rams taking on the Cardinals.

Several notable games have taken place on Saturdays, including the New England Patriots' historic comeback from a 22–3 deficit in the fourth quarter against the New York Giants in 1996, a game the same season between the Philadelphia Eagles and the New York Jets in which the Eagles won in dramatic fashion over the 1-13 Jets to keep their playoff hopes alive (they would eventually qualify), the final game at Three Rivers Stadium featuring the Pittsburgh Steelers and Washington Redskins in 2000, another Patriots-Giants matchup in 2007 which saw the Patriots complete a 16–0 season and was simulcast on three networks, the last-ever match at Texas Stadium won by the Baltimore Ravens over the Dallas Cowboys in 2008, a 2012 game between the Detroit Lions and the Atlanta Falcons in which Calvin Johnson of the Lions set the NFL record for receiving yards in one season, a 2015 game between division rivals Eagles and the Redskins to decide the NFC East champion, a 2022 game between the Indianapolis Colts and the Minnesota Vikings in which the Vikings completed the largest comeback in NFL history down 33 points at halftime for a 39–36 overtime win, and a 2022 game between the rivals Titans and Jaguars to decide the AFC South champion.

== Flexible scheduling ==
Since the 2006 season, the NFL has used a "flexible scheduling" system for the last seven weeks of the regular season. This is because by week 11, there are a number of teams that have been eliminated or nearly eliminated from playoff contention. Flex-scheduling ensures that all Sunday night games and, on the doubleheader network, the late game that is designated as the national game (airs in the majority of markets nationally), have playoff significance, regardless of whether or not both teams are competing for a playoff spot. Two examples of this type of flexing involved the Carolina Panthers in 2008 and 2009. In the first instance, the Panthers and New York Giants saw a late season game flexed due to the winner of that matchup clinching home-field advantage throughout the NFC playoffs as the top seed. The next season, an out-of-contention Panthers team hosted the 11–2 Minnesota Vikings, who had a chance to improve their playoff positioning and take the top seed in the NFC playoffs. Sometimes, games will be flexed due to a team's success; for instance, the 2007 matchup between the New England Patriots and Buffalo Bills at Ralph Wilson Stadium was flexed due to the Patriots' potential run at an undefeated regular season that they eventually completed.

This system also allows teams that enjoy unexpected success to acquire a prime time spot that was not on their original schedule. Thanksgiving games and all games airing on cable channels (Monday, Thursday, and Saturday games) are fixed in place and cannot be changed to Sunday night, as are games during Christmas weekend whenever Christmas Day falls on a Sunday, as it was in 2011 (most games are played on Christmas Eve Saturday instead). It also increases the potential for teams to play on consecutive Sunday nights, as the 2007 Patriots, 2007 Redskins, the 2008 Giants, the 2012 49ers, the 2013 Broncos, 2015 Cardinals, the 2016 Cowboys, the 2018 Chiefs, the 2018 Vikings, the 2018 Rams, and the 2022 Chargers did (the Patriots hosted the Philadelphia Eagles the week following the second matchup with the Bills as scheduled, the Redskins were flexed into a matchup with the Giants and played the Vikings in a regularly scheduled matchup the week after, and the Giants hosted the Panthers one week after playing the Dallas Cowboys in Texas Stadium. The 49ers played the Seahawks in Seattle one week after playing at the Patriots. The Broncos were flexed into a matchup with the Chiefs and then playing on the road against the Patriots. The Vikings were flexed into a matchup with the Bears then hosted the Packers the next week. The Rams were flexed into a matchup also with the Bears then hosted the Eagles the next week.)

Under the system, Sunday games in the affected weeks in the Eastern and Central time zones will tentatively have the start time of 1:00 p.m. ET (10:00 am PT). Those played in the Mountain or Pacific time zones will have the tentative start time of 4:05/4:25 p.m. ET (1:05/1:25 p.m. PT). Also, there will be two games provisionally scheduled for the 8:20 p.m. for Sundays (8:15 p.m. for Mondays) ET slot. On the Tuesday twelve days before the games (possibly sooner for later weeks), the league will move one or two games to the prime time slots (or keep its original choices), and possibly move one or more 1:00 p.m. slotted games to the 4:00 p.m. slot.

Since 2023, Fox and CBS each may protect 17 Sunday afternoon games, one per week, during weeks 11–17 and NBC selects which game they want to air. For example, in 2011, NBC wanted a late season game between the Denver Broncos and New England Patriots which featured Tim Tebow as the Broncos quarterback. CBS protected the game and NBC got a game featuring the San Diego Chargers instead. Networks have the option of waiving protection to allow for a Sunday night airing, as happened with a game between the unbeaten Kansas City Chiefs and one-loss Denver Broncos in Week 11 of the 2013 season. The contest was protected by CBS, which would have to air it in the regional 4:05 p.m. timeslot because the game was in Denver and the network did not have doubleheader rights that week. CBS thus allowed NBC to pick up the telecast for a nationwide broadcast.

Neither CBS or Fox can protect games in week 18. In years when Christmas falls on Sunday (like in 2022) or on Monday (like in 2023), the NFL schedules its main slate of afternoon games on Christmas Eve (which would fall on Saturday or Sunday) without a prime time game (in both years there was a primetime game but neither one of the games were not eligible to be flexed), as NBC's game would be moved to Christmas night (see below). Thus, Sunday Night game flexible scheduling can not occur in week 16; NBC is then given flexible scheduling in week 10 instead. However, the other two types of flexible scheduling changes—moving a game from early to late, or changing networks—is still possible during such weeks. The NFL went around the flexible scheduling procedure prohibition in the 2016 NFL season where Christmas falls on a Sunday by scheduling two Sunday games at 4:30 p.m. and 8:30 p.m. ET, respectively.

During the last week of the season, the league could reschedule games as late as six days before the contests so that as many of the television networks as possible will be able to broadcast a game that has major playoff implications, and so that several division races or Wild Card spots are on the line at the same time. The week 18 games on Saturday afternoon, Saturday night and Sunday night is decided exclusively by the NFL; networks cannot protect or choose during the final week. For this final Sunday Night contest, the league prefers to flex-in a matchup in which at least one team must win in order to qualify for the playoffs, regardless of what happens in the other week 18 games. Since 2010 when the NFL began scheduling only divisional matchups in the final week, it is possible an intradivisional game that appeared on national television previously could be selected again. The NFL will only select such a game if there is no other suitable option. This example happened in the 2011 season concerning matchups between the Dallas Cowboys and New York Giants. In week 14, both teams played a game with major playoff implications that could have all but eliminated the Giants from playoff contention with a loss. Instead, that game marked the start of a four-game winning streak to end the season which included a game where the Giants eliminated the Eagles from playoff contention (despite a win over the Cowboys) with a win over the New York Jets. This win flexed the following week's matchup, where the Giants hosted the Cowboys, into NBC's slot, which determined the NFC East champion.

Individual teams may make no more than four appearances on NBC's Sunday Night Football package during the season. Only three teams may make as many as six prime time appearances (Sunday night, Monday night, Thursday night, and Saturday night combined). The remaining teams may make a maximum of five prime time appearances. In addition, there are no restrictions amongst intra-division games being "flexed."

In the 2014 NFL season, a related policy known as "cross-flexing" became available, where games can now be swapped between CBS and Fox, regardless of conference, in order to improve balance between the two networks, and expand the distribution of noteworthy games. A notable example occurred in the final week of the season, where a game between the Atlanta Falcons and Carolina Panthers playing in Atlanta to clinch the NFC South division (which was tentatively scheduled for Fox with a 1 p.m. kickoff) was cross-flexed to CBS and moved to a 4:25 p.m. kickoff, in order to give CBS a late-afternoon game with serious playoff implications (since Fox was also, by virtue of its package, to air a game between Detroit and Green Bay that would determine the NFC North champion and a first-round bye, and the AFC North title game between Cincinnati and Pittsburgh had been flexed to Sunday Night Football).

In the 2020 offseason, the NFL queried its teams on the possibility of expanding flexible scheduling to Monday Night Football. No consensus was achieved on whether or not such an expansion would be viable, as travel and lodging reservations are set in advance and would require visiting teams to book hotels for an extra day because of the uncertainty such a flex option would entail, as would syndication issues under the league's local syndication policies. Flexible scheduling would not take effect until Monday Night Football's next contract begins in 2022.

In 2020, because of numerous pandemic-related issues that led to CBS losing a 1 (Pittsburgh vs Tennessee) and 4:25 PM (New England at Kansas City) game in Week 4, the NFL used the flexible schedule rule to move Indianapolis at Chicago from 1 to 4:25 PM.

=== Current policy ===
As of the 2025 NFL season the following policy is used for flex scheduling:

- Sunday afternoon games may be moved freely between the 1 p.m. ET "early" and 4:05 p.m./4:25 p.m. "late" ET timeslots. The only exception being that games that take place in the Mountain or Pacific time zones must always be in the "late" slot.
- Only Sunday afternoon or TBD-listed games may be flexed to Sunday Night Football, Monday Night Football, or Thursday Night Football.
- For SNF, a game can be flexed twice during Weeks 5–10, and at the NFL's discretion during Weeks 11–17.
  - For Weeks 5–13, the decision to flex must be made at least 12 days in advance.
  - For Weeks 14–17, the decision to flex must be made at least 6 days in advance.
- For MNF, a game may be flexed at the NFL's discretion during Weeks 12–17. The decision to flex the game must be made at least 12 days in advance.
- For TNF, a maximum of two games may be flexed during Weeks 13–17. The decision to flex a game must be made 21 days in advance in order for the stadium, local authorities, and the affected games' primary market broadcasters (since the broadcasters of the game flexed in must reschedule programming to carry its local pre-game, the game, and post-game show, and the broadcasters of the game flexed out must negotiate refunds with advertisers and cancel arrangements with backup stations since their regular Thursday night schedule would be broadcast) to coordinate the schedule change.
- When a SNF, MNF, or TNF game is flexed, the game originally scheduled for that primetime slot is moved to one of the Sunday afternoon timeslots.
- For Week 18, there are no Thursday night games held. The Monday night game is held on Saturday as a doubleheader (legally belonging to the Monday night contract). The matchups for Week 18 are listed, but start times are tentatively listed as Sunday early (Eastern or Central) or Sunday late (Mountain and Pacific). The NFL schedules games with playoff implications as early as the conclusion of the Sunday afternoon late games but as late as the conclusion of the Monday night game, based on the relevance. The Saturday, Sunday afternoon, and Sunday night games for week 18 are announced following the conclusion of Week 17. This allows the NFL to schedule games with playoff implications in consequential order. For logistics, teams playing on Monday night in Week 17 are not permitted to play on Saturday of Week 18. The Week 17 Monday night game may also be flexed out in order to avoid a conflict if potential issues could occur.

== Holiday games ==
=== Thanksgiving Day games ===
Thanksgiving Day contests have been held since before the league's inception. The Detroit Lions have hosted a game every Thanksgiving since 1934 (with the exception of 1939–1944 due to the "Franksgiving" confusion and World War II), and they have been nationally televised since 1953. The first color television broadcast of an NFL regular season game was the 1965 Thanksgiving contest between the Lions and Baltimore Colts. In 1966, the NFL introduced an annual game hosted by the Dallas Cowboys, which has been played every year except in 1975 and 1977 when the St. Louis Cardinals hosted a match instead. However, fans both inside and outside St. Louis did not respond well to an NFL fixture on Thanksgiving, and thus Dallas resumed hosting the game in 1978.

When the AFL began holding annual Thanksgiving Day games, the league chose a different model, circulating the game among several cities. During the 1967–69 seasons, two Thanksgiving AFL games were televised each year.

After the 1970 merger, the NFL decided to keep only the traditional Detroit and Dallas games. Due to the broadcast contracts in place since 1970, three NFC teams play on Thanksgiving, as opposed to only one AFC outfit. During even years, the Lions play their Thanksgiving game against an AFC team, and thus are televised by the network holding the AFC package (NBC and later CBS since 1998); the Cowboys host an NFC team and are shown by the network with the NFC package (CBS and later Fox since 1994). During odd years, Dallas hosts an AFC team and Detroit plays an NFC opponent (usually another NFC North team, and often the Green Bay Packers, who draw high television ratings). Every decade or so, this even-odd rotation was reversed, Detroit hosting an NFC team in even years and an AFC team in odd years, Dallas hosting an AFC team in even years and an NFC team in odd years. Detroit is always the early broadcast and Dallas the mid-afternoon broadcast.

Following the introduction of Thursday Night Football in 2006, a third Thanksgiving game was added, a primetime game hosted by one of the remaining 30 NFL teams each year. While the first game featured two AFC teams, conference affiliation has varied since. Starting in 2012, the prime time Thanksgiving game has aired on NBC. In the future, the NFL may use flexible scheduling to allow the Lions or Cowboys to host a prime-time game, provided an Eastern time zone team is given the early (12:30 p.m.) slot.

Starting in 2014, changes to the NFL television contract allow either traditional Thanksgiving game to prime time (and NBC) and schedule an AFC game in either window to accommodate CBS, while Fox would get the other traditional game with Dallas or Detroit; to date, this has never happened. Cross-flexing also liberated CBS and Fox from their usual conference affiliation on Thursdays; thus Dallas and Detroit both hosted NFC opponents in 2014, 2015, 2016, and 2018 (in 2014, 2015, and 2018, the prime time game also featured two NFC franchises, so the AFC was completely shut out of the holiday those years). Fox has yet to broadcast an AFC team on Thanksgiving.

=== Christmas and Christmas Eve games ===
In recent years, the NFL has generally scheduled games on Christmas Day only if it falls on a day normally used for games (Saturday, Sunday, Monday). If Christmas Day falls on a Sunday, most of the games are to be played on the preceding day, Saturday, December 24, with three games scheduled for Christmas Night to be broadcast nationally (which most recently happened in 2022).

The first NFL games played on December 25 came during the 1971 season. The first two games of the Divisional Playoff Round that year were held on Christmas Day. The first game that day was between Dallas Cowboys and the Minnesota Vikings. The second of the two contests played that day, the Miami Dolphins versus the Kansas City Chiefs, ended up being the longest game in NFL history. The league received numerous complaints due to the length of this game, reportedly because it caused havoc with Christmas dinners around the nation. As a result, the NFL decided to not schedule any Christmas Day matches for the next 17 seasons.

In 1976 and 1977, the last two years before the advent of the 16-game schedule and expanded playoffs, the NFL came up with different approaches to avoid Christmas play. In 1976, when Christmas Day fell on a Saturday, the league moved the start of the regular season up one week to Sunday, September 12. The divisional playoffs were held on the weekend of December 18 and 19, leaving the conference championship games on Sunday, December 26. Super Bowl XI was played on January 9, 1977, the earliest it has ever been held. In 1977, with Christmas Day on Sunday, the NFL split the divisional playoffs, and for the only time since the AFL–NFL merger, each conference held both divisional playoff games the same day (AFC Saturday, December 24 and NFC Monday, December 26), ostensibly not to give one team a two-day rest advantage over the other for the conference championship games. Since two of the venues were in the Western United States, it was not possible to have regional coverage in both time slots on either day.

The NFL continued to avoid Christmas Day even after it started to increase the regular season and the playoffs. The league expanded to a 16-game regular season and a 10-team playoff tournament in 1978, but it was not until 1982 that the regular season ended after Christmas Day, due to the players' strike. In 1989, the NFL tried another Christmas Day game, with the Cincinnati Bengals hosted by the Minnesota Vikings, but it was a 9:00 p.m. ET Monday Night Football contest, thereby not conflicting with family dinners. In the years since, the NFL has played an occasional late-afternoon or night game on the holiday but there has not been a Christmas Day game starting earlier than 1:00 p.m. ET since 2022.

There have also been several games played on Christmas Eve over the years, including an Oakland Raiders–Baltimore Colts playoff contest in 1977 which culminated in a play known as "Ghost to the Post". These games have typically been played during the afternoon out of deference to the holiday.

The broadcasting contract beginning in 2022 allowed Fox to air games on Christmas Day if the schedule allowed for it. However, the 2022 season was the only season when Christmas fell on a Sunday during the entirety of the media rights deal, so all three Sunday networks had a single game each. The 2023 season saw the two Sunday afternoon networks airing a single game, in addition to Monday Night Football.

Beginning in 2024, the NFL made Christmas Day a regular part of the league's schedule. Also that year, the league's Christmas Day games were out of market on Netflix. Under the terms of the 2022 contract, CBS Sports is contracted to produce Christmas Day games and broadcast them in the primary market affiliates of both teams.

=== New Year's games ===
The NFL has so far only staged games on New Year's Day when it falls on a Sunday. Historically when this occurs, the numerous college football bowl games that traditionally play on New Year's Day then move to Monday, January 2.

In the 20th Century, New Year's Day fell during the postseason. The AFL played its first league championship game on January 1, 1961. Thereafter, games were played on New Year's Day in 1967 (the 1966 NFL and AFL Championship Games), in 1978 (the 1977 NFC and AFC Championship Games), in 1984 (the 1983 NFC and AFC Divisional Playoff Games), in 1989 (the 1988 NFC and AFC Divisional Playoff Games), and in 1995 (the second half of the 1994 NFC and AFC Wild Card Games).

The league's schedule during the 2000s and 2010s when resulted in New Year's Weekend consistently falling during the last week of the NFL's regular season (unless for when Christmas landing on Thursday which lands on the opening weekend of the postseason). The league's policy during that time was to play all of the games of the last week on one day to ensure an equal amount of rest heading into the playoffs. In 2006, 2012, and 2017 (the final weekend of the 2005, 2011, and 2016 regular seasons), all 32 teams played on Sunday, January 1. In those years when January 1 fell on a Monday, all 32 teams played on New Year's Eve.

After the league expanded to a 17-game schedule in 2021, New Year's Weekend has consistently fallen during the second-to-last week of the NFL's regular season (except for when Christmas lands on Thursday which falls on the last week of the season). In 2023, during the 2022 regular season, the regular slate of Sunday games was scheduled on New Year's Day and a Monday Night Football game on January 2. For the following 2023 regular season, the regular slate of Sunday games was still scheduled for New Year's Eve, but the Monday Night Football game was moved to Saturday, December 30 to defer to the New Year's Day college football bowl games.

=== Other holidays ===
- The NFL scheduled Monday Night Football games on Labor Day in the past, but has not done so since 2000, as it was determined that games during the Labor Day weekend were the lowest-rated of the season. Currently, Labor Day weekend serves as a league-wide bye week between the final preseason game and the start of the regular season.
- A Monday Night Football game is always scheduled on Columbus Day, a federal holiday.
- The NFL only plays on Halloween or Veterans Day if the holiday falls on a day in which football is normally played (Thursday, Sunday, or Monday).
- Since 2022, the NFL has scheduled one Monday Night Football game during the Wild Card round of the playoffs mostly falling on Martin Luther King Jr. Day.
- Beginning in 2022, the NFL will schedule the Super Bowl on Valentines Day if it lands on Sunday.
- Since 2023, the NFL scheduled afternoon games on Black Friday, the day after Thanksgiving.

== Blackout policies ==
Since 1973, the NFL has maintained a blackout policy that states that a home game cannot be televised locally if it is not sold out 72 hours prior to its start time. If this occurs, the local affiliate will have to move network programming airing in the afternoon to fill the game slot, air syndicated programming, air paid programming (including infomercials), and/or revert to a simulcast of another station, but will not be allowed to air any NFL-related programming unless alternate programming from the network is NFL-related. If there is only one NFL game on the network of the affected affiliate, the pre-game and post-game shows may also not be aired at the affiliate's discretion. Before that, NFL games were blacked out in the home team's market even if the game was a sellout. The NFL is the only major professional sports league in North America that requires teams to sell out in order to broadcast a game on television locally, although IndyCar imposes a blackout of the Indianapolis 500 that has been waived after a sellout in 2016 and 2025, a behind closed doors event in 2020, a reduced capacity event in 2021, and a rain-delayed event in 2024.

Before 1973, the lone exception to the blackout rule occurred in 1970 when the Giants and Jets played at Shea Stadium. The NFL allowed the game to be broadcast by WCBS-TV so Giants fans would not be denied an opportunity to see an away game on their local station (that same season, Raiders owner Al Davis enforced the blackout of his team's regular season finale vs. the 49ers, even though the NFL granted CBS affiliate KPIX permission to telecast the game in the Bay Area).

Furthermore, the NFL is the only network that imposes an anti-siphoning rule in all teams' local markets; The NFL sells syndication rights of each team's Thursday and Monday night games to a local over-the-air station in each local market. The respective cable station must be blacked out and replaced with a relay of another cable station on the frequencies of the blacked out station when that team is playing the said game. Otherwise, a static or animated caption will air in the event that an event is blacked out on an affected station that is temporarily closed in the local market.

In the other leagues, nationally televised games are often blacked out on the national networks they are airing on in their local markets, with such broadcasts replaced by alternate programming (or in most cases on cable networks, a temporary sign-off of the station) but they can still be seen on their local regional sports network that normally has their local broadcasting rights.

This led to controversy in 2007, when the New England Patriots were scheduled to play the New York Giants at Giants Stadium in their regular season finale on the NFL Network, in what was to be a chance to complete the first 16–0 regular season in NFL history. After the Senate Judiciary Committee threatened the NFL's antitrust exemption if it did not make the game available nationwide, the NFL relented and made the game the first in league history to be simulcast on three networks. The game aired on the NFL Network, as planned; on NBC, which would normally have the rights to prime time games; and, since the away team was an AFC team, on CBS. (WCVB in Boston holds the rights to the NFL's syndicated package for Patriots games, causing this game to be available on 3 over-the-air stations in the Boston TV market). This however, did not lead to the NFL offering this package to other channels; the games have remained on the NFL Network, although cable coverage of NFL Network has increased in the intervening period.

Until September 2014, the NFL blackout rules were sanctioned by the Federal Communications Commission (FCC), which enforced rules requiring cable and satellite providers to not distribute any sports telecast that had been blacked out by a broadcast television station within their market of service. On September 9, 2014, USA Today published an editorial from FCC chairman Tom Wheeler, who stated that "sports blackout rules are obsolete and have to go", and that he was submitting a proposal to "get rid of the FCC's blackout rules once and for all", to be voted on by the agency's members on September 30 of that year. On September 30, 2014, the Commission voted unanimously to repeal the FCC's blackout rules. However, the removal of these rules are, to an extent, purely symbolic; the NFL can still enforce its blackout policies on a contractual basis with television networks, stations, and service providers, a process made feasible by the large amount of leverage the league exerts upon its media partners.

Ultimately, no games would be blacked out at all during the 2014 season. On March 23, 2015, the NFL's owners voted to suspend the blackout rules for 2015, meaning that all games will be televised in their home markets, regardless of ticket sales. The blackout rule has been suspended for every subsequent season through 2022.

However, the NFL's syndication exclusivity rule continues to be in effect.

== Commercial breaks ==
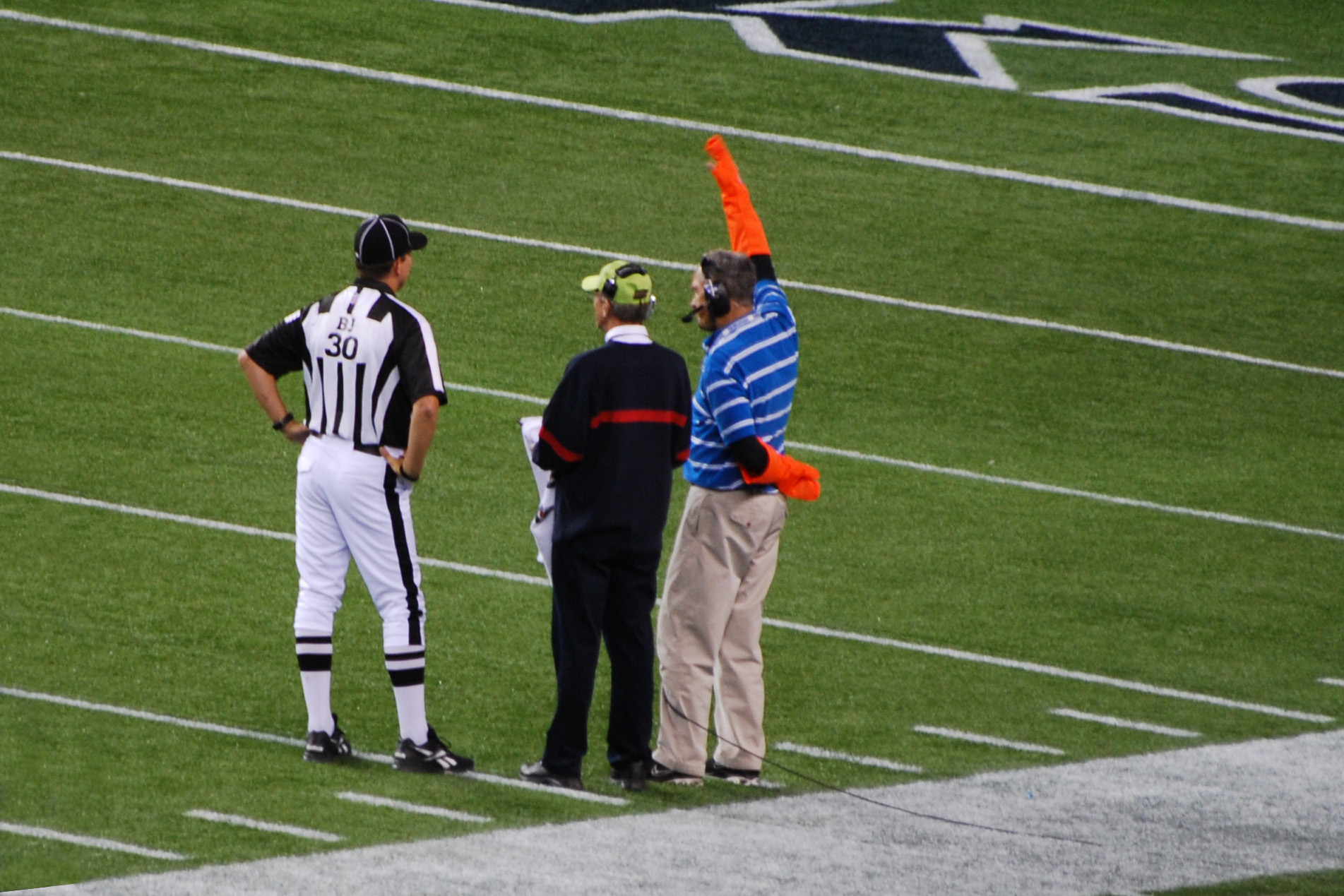
The network television coordinator with orange sleeves will lower his arm when the commercial is over.

During each half of a network-televised game, there are nine prescribed commercial breaks following the official kickoff. Two are firmly scheduled, and seven others are worked in during breaks in the play.

Pre-scheduled commercial breaks:

- The end of the first (or third) quarter
- The two-minute warning of the second (or fourth) quarter

Other instances used for commercial breaks (seven total required per half):

- A timeout called by either team
- Instant replay stoppage
- Game stoppage after a score
- Game stoppage after a kickoff or punt (excluding the opening kickoff of each half)
- Game stoppage after a turnover
- Injury timeout

Two commercial breaks during the typical 12-minute halftime period are considered separate.

Networks are more apt to front-load their commercials in the first and third quarters, to prevent an overrun in the second and fourth quarters respectively. However, in the event that at least one early-window game is running long (after 4:25 p.m. ET) on the doubleheader network, the network will normally hold its commercials for the late window until all audiences have joined the late games, to ensure maximum coverage for its advertisers. In the rare event that the first quarter of a late game ends before all early games on that network have ended, the network may either take a break consisting entirely of network promos / PSAs, or not take a break at all during the between-quarters timeout, and those commercials are rescheduled for later in the game.

If a team calls a timeout and the network decides to use it for a commercial break, a representative from the broadcast crew stationed on the sidelines wearing orange sleeves makes a crossing motion with his hands to alert the officials. The referee declares it a "two-minute timeout."

Once a broadcast has fulfilled the seven "random" breaks, game stoppages are no longer needed for commercials. The orange sleeve will hold his hands down in a twirl motion to alert the officials. If a team calls a timeout, the referee will declare it a "30-second timeout."

Since the nine total commercial breaks for the second half are to be finished prior to the end of regulation, commercial breaks are rarely needed in overtime situations, apart from a break immediately after the end of regulation and a break at the two-minute warning, should the overtime period reach that point. Commercials for these purposes are sometimes pre-sold on an if-needed basis (such as the specialized AIG "overtime" ads often seen during the early 2000s). In many cases, overtime periods are conducted without any commercials. By definition, a game that has entered overtime is tied, and so the game is still undecided, thus increasing the appeal of the given game. This also allows the extended broadcast to finish in a timely manner. In cases of long overtime periods, networks have been known to have a commercial break during a lengthy injury time out and in the regular season the two-minute warning of the overtime period. During postseason play, the very rare instances of a second overtime will feature a commercial between periods. Overtimes in the postseason are treated as if a new game has started, meaning most of the regular season commercial break rules are followed.

Beginning in the 2017 season, the ten breaks were reduced to nine per half. Networks are now required to have four breaks per quarter, along with the break after the first (or third) quarter, with each break extended by 30 seconds from 1:50 to 2:20. Also, commercial breaks are no longer permitted after kickoffs (except in the case of an extended stoppage in play after the kickoff, such as an injury), abolishing the quirk where a break occurs twice—once after a score, and then a second break on an ensuing kickoff. The break will only occur after the score.

== Broadcasting history & impact ==
The NFL, along with boxing and professional wrestling (before the latter publicly became known as a staged sport), was a pioneer of sports broadcasting during a time when baseball and college football were more popular than professional football. Due to the NFL understanding television at an earlier time, it was able to surpass Major League Baseball in the 1960s as the most popular sport in the United States.

=== Modern popularity ===
NBC Sunday Night Football became only the second regular live prime time television program in American history to emerge as the most watched overall American television series, after ending Fox's American Idol's record of eight consecutive seasons on hold of the rank in the 2011–12 season. The series holds this rank every season since, except in 2013, 2014 and 2018 when CBS shows NCIS and The Big Bang Theory, and ABC show Roseanne, respectively earned the title. As of 2025, Super Bowl LIX on Fox in 2025 is the most watched telecast by average in American history, attracting 127.7 million viewers for both halves of the game. Meanwhile, Super Bowl LI on Fox in 2017 remains the most watched telecast on peak conclusion in American history, drawing 172 million viewers (more than half of the U.S. population of 340 million that same year) in the league's first overtime period ever for a Super Bowl.

In November 2017, ratings for the first seven weeks declined by 5% compared to the same period in 2016; and decreased by 15% when compared to the same period in 2015, a strong season. Although ratings for the NFL have declined steadily after the Super Bowl in 2015, the latter remains the only program on American television to have attracted at least 100 million viewers on a single night annually since the 1983 series finale of M*A*S*H on CBS. The NFL telecasts are known for their relative stability in their television ratings in the United States since the beginning of the 21st century. Since 2010, except 2019 and 2021, the annual Super Bowl telecasts (including the halftime shows) have regularly attracted more than 100 million viewers in the United States alone, making it the only broadcast in U.S. television history to exceed the said annual viewership threshold for at least 10 years overall.

In 2025, the NFL dominated the list of most-watched telecasts in the United States that year; all of the top eight telecasts were NFL playoff or Thanksgiving games, and 45 out of the top 50, 84 out of the top 100, and 120 out of the top 150 most-watched telecasts of the year were NFL contests.

=== Coverage style changes over time ===
The style of pro football broadcasting has seen several changes since the 1990s, including female hosts and sideline reporters, visual first-down markers, advanced graphics, new multi-camera angles, and high definition telecasts. The most recent contract extensions have, for the first time, allowed the networks to broadcast games on the Internet.

=== List of NFL television contracts ===
NFL television contracts after the AFL-NFL merger
Period	AFC Package	NFC Package	Sunday Night	Monday Night	Thursday Night	Saturday Night
1970–1973	NBC	CBS	—N/a	ABC	—N/a	—N/a
1974–1977	NBC	CBS	—N/a	ABC	—N/a	ABC
1978–1981	NBC	CBS	ABC	ABC	ABC	—N/a

NFL television contracts since 1982 with cost in millions of USD per year. Streaming services in italics.
Period	AFC Package	NFC Package	Sunday Night	Monday Night	Thursday Night	Saturday Night	Sunday Ticket (Note: NFL Sunday Ticket is an out-of-market sports package that broadcasts NFL regular season games unavailable on local affiliates. It carries all regional Sunday afternoon games currently produced by Fox and CBS.)	Total Amount (Note: Does not include revenue from NFL Sunday Ticket)	Refs
1982–1986	NBC ($107)	CBS ($120)	ABC	ABC ($115)	ABC	NBC/CBS (Late season)	—N/a	$420	
1987–1989	NBC ($135)	CBS ($165)	ESPN (2nd half) ($51)	ABC ($125)	—N/a	NBC/CBS (Late season)	—N/a	$473	
1990–1993	NBC ($188)	CBS ($265)	TNT (1st half) ($111) ESPN (2nd half) ($111)	ABC ($225)	TNT(First Half); ESPN (Second half)	NBC/CBS (Late season)	—N/a	$900	
1994–1997	NBC ($217)	Fox ($395)	TNT (1st half) ($124) ESPN (2nd half) ($131)	ABC ($230)	TNT (First half); ESPN (Second half)	NBC/Fox (Late season)	DirecTV	$1,100	
1998–2002	CBS ($500)	Fox ($550)	ESPN ($600)	ABC ($550)	ESPN	CBS/Fox/ESPN (Late season)	DirecTV ($400)	$2,200	
2003–2005	CBS ($500)	Fox ($550)	ESPN ($600)	ABC ($550)	ABC (Opening Night); ESPN	CBS/Fox/ESPN (Late season)	DirecTV ($400)	$2,200	
2006–2010	CBS ($622.5)	Fox ($712.5)	NBC ($650)	ESPN; ESPN Deportes ($1,100)	NBC (Opening Night); NFL Network (2nd half) ($0)	NFL Network (Late season)	DirecTV ($700)	$3,085	
2011	CBS ($622.5)	Fox ($712.5)	NBC ($650)	ESPN; ESPN Deportes ($1,100)	NBC (Opening Night); NFL Network (2nd half) ($0)	—N/a	DirecTV ($1,000)	$3,085	
2012–2013	CBS ($622.5)	Fox ($712.5)	NBC ($650)	ESPN; ESPN Deportes ($1,100)	NBC (Opening Night and Thanksgiving); NFL Network ($0)	—N/a	DirecTV ($1,000)	$3,085	
2014	CBS; CBS All-Access (Note: Rebranded to Paramount+ on March 4, 2021.) ($1,000)	Fox (Note: Contract includes the broadcaster's TV Everywhere services.); Fox Deportes ($1,100)	NBC; Universo ($950)	ESPN; ESPN Deportes ($1,900)	NBC (Opening Night and Thanksgiving); NFL Network ($0); CBS (8 weeks, $275)	CBS/NFL Network (Late season)	DirecTV ($1,000)	>$5,000	
2015	CBS; CBS All-Access ($1,000)	Fox; Fox Deportes ($1,100)	NBC; Universo ($950)	ESPN; ESPN Deportes ($1,900)	NBC (Opening Night and Thanksgiving); NFL Network ($0); CBS (8 weeks, $275)	CBS/NFL Network (Late season)	DirecTV ($1,500)	>$5,000	
2016	CBS; CBS All-Access ($1,000)	Fox; Fox Deportes ($1,100)	NBC; Universo ($950)	ESPN; ESPN Deportes ($1,900)	NBC (Opening Night and Thanksgiving Night); NFL Network ($0); NBC (5 weeks, $225); CBS (5 weeks, $225); Twitter (10 weeks, $10)	CBS/NBC/NFL Network (Late season)	DirecTV ($1,500)	>$5,000	
2017	CBS; CBS All-Access ($1,000)	Fox; Fox Deportes ($1,100)	NBC; Universo ($950)	ESPN; ESPN Deportes ($1,900)	NBC (Opening Night and Thanksgiving Night); NFL Network ($0); NBC (6 weeks, $225); CBS (5 weeks, $225); Amazon Prime Video (11 weeks, $50)	CBS/NBC/NFL Network (Late season)	DirecTV ($1,500)	>$5,000	
2018–2019	CBS; CBS All-Access ($1,000)	Fox; Fox Deportes ($1,100)	NBC; Universo ($950)	ESPN; ESPN Deportes ($1,900)	NBC (Opening Night and Thanksgiving Night); NFL Network ($0); Fox (11 weeks, $660); Prime Video/Twitch (11 weeks, $65)	Fox/NFL Network (Late season)	DirecTV ($1,500)	>$5,000	
2020–2021	CBS; CBS All-Access ($1,000)	Fox; Fox Deportes ($1,100)	NBC; Universo ($950)	ESPN; ESPN Deportes ($1,900)	NBC (Opening Night and Thanksgiving Night); NFL Network ($0); Fox (11 weeks, $660); Prime Video/Twitch (12 weeks, $65)	Fox/NFL Network (Late season); Prime Video/Twitch (One game)	DirecTV ($1,500)	>$5,000	
2022	CBS; CBS All-Access ($1,000)	Fox; Fox Deportes ($1,100)	NBC; Universo ($950)	ESPN; ESPN Deportes; ABC (Note: ABC will air three Monday Night Football games, two Saturday games, and simulcast select ESPN games, including the Monday Night Super Wild Card game and a Divisional game. ABC will also air Super Bowl LXI and Super Bowl LXV.); ESPN+ (Note: ESPN+ became part of the ESPN app in 2025.) ($2,700)	NBC (Opening Night and Thanksgiving Night); Prime Video/Twitch ($1,000)	Fox and NFL Network (Late season)	DirecTV ($1,500)	>$5,000	
2023–2033 (Note: NFL Network will exclusively broadcast a select schedule of games per year.) (Note: These deals have an opt-out clause after the 2029 season, with the exception for ESPN/ABC, whose opt-out clause is after 2030)	CBS; Paramount+ ($2,100)	Fox; Fox Deportes; Tubi; Fox One (Note: Fox One launched in 2025.) ($2,200)	NBC; Universo; Telemundo (select games); Peacock ($2,000)	ESPN; ESPN Deportes; ABC; ESPN+ ($2,700)	NBC (Opening Night and Thanksgiving Night); Prime Video/Twitch ($1,000)	NFL Network (Late season)	YouTube TV ($2000)	>$12,000	

=== List of NFL network broadcasters past & present ===
Current English-language broadcasters:

- NBC
  - 1939, 1955–1963: (NFL)
  - 1965–1969: (AFL)
  - 1970–1997: (AFC – Sundays, Thanksgiving, two Saturdays)
    - 1970–1983: All AFC playoff games, Super Bowl every two years
    - 1984–1989: All AFC playoff games, Super Bowl every three years
    - 1990–1997: Most AFC playoff games, Super Bowl every three years
  - 2006–2033: NBC Sunday Night Football, Kickoff game, (2006-2022 Super Bowl every three years, 2023-2033 Super Bowl every four years)
    - 2006–2013: Two wild-card playoff games
    - 2012–2033: Thanksgiving primetime game
    - 2014–2019; 2024–2033: One wild-card playoff game, one divisional playoff game
    - 2016–2017: Several Thursdays, rare Saturdays [simulcast on NFL Network]
    - 2020–2023: Two wild-card playoff games, one divisional playoff game
- CBS
  - 1956–1969: (NFL – Sundays & several Mondays)
  - 1970–1993: (NFC – Sundays, Thanksgiving, two Saturdays)
    - 1970–1983: All NFC playoff games, Super Bowl every two years
    - 1984–1989: All NFC playoff games, Super Bowl every three years
    - 1990–1993: Most NFC playoff games, Super Bowl every three years
  - 1998–2005: (AFC – Sundays, Thanksgiving, two Saturdays, most AFC playoff games, Super Bowl every three years)
  - 2006–2013: (AFC – Sundays, Thanksgiving, most AFC playoff games, Super Bowl every three years)
  - 2014–2033: (NFL – Sundays, Thanksgiving, most AFC playoff games,) (2006-2022 Super Bowl every three years, 2023-2033 Super Bowl every four years)
  - 2020–2021, 2024: one additional wild card playoff game from either conference
    - 2014–2017: Several Thursdays, rare Saturdays [either conference, simulcast on NFL Network]
- Fox
  - 1994–2005: (NFC – Sundays, Thanksgiving, two Saturdays, most NFC playoff games, Super Bowl every three years)
  - 2006–2013: (NFC – Sundays, Thanksgiving, most NFC playoff games, Super Bowl every three years)
  - 2014–2033: (NFL – Sundays, Thanksgiving, most NFC playoff games,) (2006-2022 Super Bowl every three years, 2023-2033 Super Bowl every four years)
  - 2022: one additional wild card playoff game from either conference
    - 2018–2021: Several Thursdays, rare Saturdays [either conference, simulcast on NFL Network 2018-2022]
- ABC
  - 1948, 1950, 1953–1955: (NFL)
  - 1960–1964: (AFL)
  - 1970–2005; 2022-2033: Monday Night Football
    - 1984–1989: Super Bowl every three years
    - 1990–2005: Two wild-card playoff games, Super Bowl every three years
    - 2003–2005: Kickoff game
  - 2015–2033: One wild-card playoff game
  - 2023–2033: One divisional playoff game
  - 2018–2033: Pro Bowl
  - 2023–2033: Super Bowl every four years
- ESPN
  - 1987–1997: ESPN Sunday Night NFL (second half of season)
  - 1998–2005: ESPN Sunday Night Football (entire season), one Thursday, one Saturday
    - 2002 only: Kickoff game
  - 2006–2033: Monday Night Football (select games simulcast on ABC from 2020–present)
    - 2021–2023: Manningcast supplemental telecast
  - 2014: One wild-card playoff game
  - 2016-2017: Pro Bowl
  - 2018–2033: Simulcasts and/or Megacast supplemental coverage of any game carried by ABC
- NFL Network
  - 2006–2021: Thursday Night Football, at least one Saturday game (except 2011–2013)
  - 2006–2011 Thanksgiving primetime game
  - 2022–2033: NFL Network Exclusive Game Series (Select International Series and late-season games)

Current Spanish-language broadcasters:

- Universo/Telemundo Deportes
  - 2014–2033: NBC simulcasts, including all playoff games
- Fox Deportes
  - 2014–2033: Fox Simulcasts, including all playoff games
    Select Fox simulcasts, including all playoff games and Thursday games broadcast on Fox
- ESPN Deportes (select simulcasts on ESPN2 from 2017 to 2020)
  - 2006–2033: ESPN/ABC simulcasts, including ESPN's wild card game.
- TelevisaUnivision
  - 2023-2033: CBS Super Bowl simulcasts.

Current mobility partners:

- Verizon Wireless
  - 2014–2017: Exclusive carrier to view NFL telecasts on mobile devices with the rights costing $250 million per year.
  - 2018–2022: Expanded agreement to include streaming in-market NFL telecasts on any mobile carrier through one of its websites such as Yahoo with the rights costing Verizon $500 million per year.
- YouTube TV/YouTube Primetime Channels
  - 2023-2029: NFL Sunday Ticket
- Amazon Prime Video/Twitch
  - 2017 only: 10 Thursday Night games, 1 Christmas game on Prime Video alone
  - 2018 and 2019: 11 Thursday Night games on Prime Video and Twitch
  - 2020-2021: 11 Thursday Night games, 1 Saturday Football game on Prime Video and Twitch
  - 2022–2033: All Thursday Night games (excluding NFL Kickoff and Thanksgiving Night Games)
  - 2023–2033: Black Friday game
  - 2024–2033: One Wild Card playoff game
- Peacock
  - 2023: One regular season and one wild-card playoff game
  - 2024–2028: One regular season game
- Netflix
  - 2024–2029: Christmas Day game

Former broadcasters:

- DuMont Television Network
  - 1951–1955: Saturday Night Football
- TNT
  - 1990–1997: several Sunday night games (first half of season)
- ESPN+
  - 2022–2024 (Note: Originally under a 12-year deal, the ESPN+ exclusive game was moved to ESPN in 2025.): One regular season game

One-time and special broadcasts:

- NFL RedZone
  - 2009-present: Premium service of live whip around coverage of Sunday afternoon games.
- Nickelodeon
  - 2021-2033: Select multicast of games on CBS, featuring kid-friendly modifications to the in-game presentation

=== Season game costs ===
In the fall of 2025, streaming every NFL game requires multiple subscriptions. In September, the cost is approximately $84 per month. By October, a combined ESPN and Fox package reduces this to $74 per month. In December, additional subscriptions to Netflix and NFL+ are needed to access all games. The total cost for the regular season is approximately $328. Including NFL Sunday Ticket, priced at $522, brings the cost to $850. Adding playoff games increases the total to around $935 for complete access to all NFL games in the 2025 season.

== Leverage over the networks ==
=== League criticism ===
The NFL's status as a prime offering by the networks has led some to conclude that unbiased coverage of the league is not possible, although this may be true of most sports. However, with the current concentration of media ownership in the U.S., the league essentially has broadcast contracts with four media companies (CBS's parent company Paramount Global, NBCUniversal, Fox Corporation, and ESPN's parent company The Walt Disney Company) that own a combined vast majority of the American broadcast and cable networks.

ESPN attempted to run a dramatic series showing steamier aspects of pro football, Playmakers, but canceled the series after the league reportedly threatened to exclude the network from the next set of TV contracts. The network also withdrew its partnership with the PBS series Frontline on the 2013 documentary League of Denial, which chronicles the history of head injuries in the NFL, shortly after a meeting between ESPN executives and league commissioner Roger Goodell took place in New York City, though ESPN denies pressure from the NFL led to its backing out of the project, claiming a lack of editorial control instead.

Then in July 2015, The Hollywood Reporter reported that sources within ESPN believed that the NFL gave them a "terrible" 2015 Monday Night Football schedule as "payback" for remarks made on air by both ESPN commentators Keith Olbermann and Bill Simmons that were critical of the league and Goodell; ESPN parted ways with both Olbermann and Simmons during that same year.

In a 2019 interview with ESPN, longtime NBC Sports anchor Bob Costas revealed that he had been relieved of duties as host of Super Bowl LII the previous year after he made comments at a University of Maryland symposium that the sport of football "destroys people's brains." A few years earlier, Costas had been told by NBC brass he could not present an essay on Football Night in America about the 2015 film Concussion because the network was in the process of bidding for the rights to Thursday Night Football.

=== Counterprogramming ===
Counterprogramming, where other networks attempt to offer a program which is intended to compete with the NFL audience for a regular season game, playoff game or the Super Bowl (as Fox did in 1992 with a special segment of the sketch comedy series In Living Color during Super Bowl XXVI), has also been heavily discouraged with the consolidation of rights among the major networks; ESPN generally airs low-profile niche sports, non-conference men's and women's college basketball (often featuring teams in non-NFL markets or non-football schools, as high-profile non-conference games usually occur in November and December during the Thanksgiving and Christmas breaks), and minor league sports on Sunday afternoons, along with basic audio-only 'carousel' reports of current NFL scores by reporters from NFL stadiums on their other networks resembling those on ESPN Radio or Fox Sports Radio. From 2013 to 2022, ESPN has done some limited counterprogramming using Canadian Football League coverage from sister network and licensing partner TSN; in most cases, ESPN carries games in times when the NFL is not airing (except in cases, such as the Grey Cup, when a conflict is unavoidable). ESPN has also counterprogrammed the NFL's Thursday Night Football games with college football games of its own; the network had been carrying college football on Thursdays years before the NFL decided to play regularly on that night.

Programming on Fox and CBS when game coverage does not occur generally consists of brokered programming, which features extreme sports tours, Professional Bull Riders event coverage, and non-championship golf and Professional Bowlers Association broadcasts, along with related documentaries. Fox has utilised the position for a "football-futbol doubleheader" with a 2:00 p.m. or 5:00 p.m. Major League Soccer match, depending on market (the early game goes to markets with a late NFL game, and the late game goes to markets with an early NFL game; MLS, Fox, and the markets in question will work to ensure the late-season push for the playoff games will not clash with the NFL game in the same market; teams with shared ownership in close markets will not be allowed to have games on at the same time, such as the New England Patriots and New England Revolution with Robert Kraft, Atlanta Falcons and Atlanta United FC with Arthur Blank, Cleveland Browns and the Columbus Crew with Jimmy Haslam, and the Kansas City Chiefs and FC Dallas with Clark Hunt). Fox uses the time also for the PBA Clash bowling event starting in 2018, and in 2021 will feature the NHRA Camping World Drag Racing Series similarly (early game markets will air the race on tape delay, late game markets will air the race live). In many cases, primary market stations will usually air a local postgame show from their station's sports department with analysis and interviews and push the brokered programming to late night or a secondary station, if they carry it at all (there are network mandates to carry the PBR and PBA, for example). NBC, which has the Sunday night package, will run Golf Channel on NBC coverage, including the Evian Championship (a women's major held in France), a PGA Tour Challenge Season, or an international team tournament (depending on year, Ryder, Solheim, or President's Cup), motorsport (IMSA SportsCar Championship and NASCAR Cup Series late-season events; all serve as lead-in programming to Football Night in America), and Olympic sports which the demographic is focused towards women, such as ISU Grand Prix of Figure Skating. Likewise, since 2010 ABC has run low-profile same-week repeats of their programming in solidarity with ESPN or women's sporting events; in 2011, it did air the INDYCAR season finale in Las Vegas, which was abandoned after reigning Indianapolis 500 champion Dan Wheldon (a resident of the Tampa Bay Buccaneers market in St. Petersburg, FL) was killed on Lap 11 of 200.

Generally, the only networks to counterprogram the Super Bowl currently are niche cable networks with no "sports fan" appeal, such as Animal Planet with their Puppy Bowl and imitation programming, and various marathons by other cable networks. In years when it does not carry the game, Fox has often purposely burned off failed sitcoms and dramas to discourage viewers from tuning away from the game, with other networks generally running marathons of popular reality or drama programs (for NBC, The Apprentice has filled this role) merely to fill the evening rather than an actual attempt to counterprogram. CBS notably runs themed 60 Minutes episodes consisting of past stories featuring figures that fit the episode's theme. In 2022, Super Bowl LVI overlapped with the Winter Olympic Games. As NBC is the Olympics rightsholder for the United States, it sought to avoid a conflict between both events by trading Super Bowl LV to CBS in order to air the 2022 game, allowing NBC to maximize revenue in the process as it had in 2018 when it aired Super Bowl LII days prior to the start of the Pyeongchang Olympics. Under a new contract with the NFL, NBC gained rights to Super Bowls in 2026, 2030, and 2034, which are also Winter Olympic years (NBC and the IOC renewed to the 2036 Summer Olympics).

Until 2014 when the highlights program Gameday Live was launched, the NFL Network during 1:00 p.m. regular season games and the playoffs merely featured a still screen with the data of ongoing games on-screen under the title NFL GameCenter, while Sirius XM NFL Radio played in the background with 'carousel' score reports, with only highlights of game action from radio play-by-play heard occasionally. Super Bowl GameCenter retains this format during the Super Bowl, but with the Westwood One radio broadcast of the game instead.

=== Broadcast delimiters ===
Since 1998, at the start of the game, a teaser animation is displayed on all broadcasts. "[Name of broadcaster] welcomes you to the following presentation of the National Football League" (or similar phrasing) is announced. At the same time, at the end of the game, the message is "[Name of broadcaster] thanks you for watching this presentation of the National Football League" (or similar phrasing). This announcement is designed to separate game coverage from news, sports analysis, or entertainment programming not under the NFL contract and ownership.

Since that same year, the NFL has owned the rights to game broadcasts once they air—a copyright disclaimer airs either before the start of the second half or after the first commercial break of the second half, depending on the broadcaster ("This broadcast is copyrighted by NFL Productions for the private use of our audience. Any other use of this broadcast, or any pictures, descriptions or accounts of the game without the consent of NFL Productions is prohibited.", or similar phrasing). The phrasing of this disclaimer has gone through several revisions, the latest iteration first being used for the 2019 season. Notably, the disclaimer now refers to the broadcast, not telecast, and assigns copyright to NFL Productions, as opposed to the NFL. As wholly owned by the league, NFL Network has the exclusive rights to re-air games, and a select few are chosen each week.

=== Restrictions on sponsorship ===
Until 2019, the NFL had a strict policy prohibiting networks from running ads during official NFL programming (pre- and post-game studio shows and the games themselves) from the gambling industry and had rejected some ads from the Las Vegas Convention and Visitors Authority. Commissioner Roger Goodell explained in 2007 that it was inappropriate for the sport to be associated with sports betting. These restrictions also applied to any hotels that contain casinos, even if the casino is not mentioned in the ad. Officially, wagers such as over/unders and point spreads cannot be acknowledged on-air. Despite this policy, Al Michaels has been known for subtly including gambling-related observations in his commentary, as did Jimmy Snyder during his time as an NFL analyst in the 1980s. Most teams inserted similar clauses into their radio contracts, which are locally negotiated. The NFL injury report and required videotaping of practice are intended to prevent gamblers from gaining inside information. In contrast, fantasy football is often free to play. Daily fantasy sports, which are structured to prevent being classified as gambling, air advertisements on the NFL's partner networks on game days, but originally not during time controlled by the league.

On January 3, 2019, the NFL announced Caesars Entertainment Corporation as the "first ever official casino sponsor of the NFL," though it was clear that the deal does not encompass sports betting.

In 2021, the NFL reached deals with seven sportsbooks for them to become "Approved Sportsbook Operators", allowing them to air commercials during NFL games and other league-controlled programming. Caesars Entertainment, DraftKings and FanDuel became official sponsors of the league, allowing them to use league and team-controlled trademarks on their websites, apps and in-person presences, while Fox Bet, BetMGM, PointsBet and WynnBet were approved to air advertising.

The NFL also bans advertisements in several other product segments, including "dietary or nutritional supplements that contain ingredients other than vitamins and minerals, [..] or any prohibited substance", energy drinks, birth control, condoms, and hard liquor. Starting with the 2017 season, the NFL, with restrictions, allows a limited amount of liquor advertising during broadcasts.

The NFL imposes restrictions on sponsored segments during game coverage; this does not apply to national or local radio broadcasts. These are permitted only before kick off, during halftime, and following the game; however, these segments (and other programming with title sponsorships, particularly halftime and post-game shows or other sports properties) can be advertised a couple of times during game coverage, and "aerial footage" providers (i.e. sponsored blimps) may be acknowledged, usually once an hour as is standard in other sports. Other acknowledgements (including HDTV or Skycam-type camera sponsorships) are limited to pre-kickoff and post-game credits. This is done so that, while competitors of the NFL's official sponsors may advertise on game broadcasts, they will not become synonymous with the league through in-game and/or title sponsorship.

=== Restrictions on reporters ===
Sideline reporters are restricted as to whom they can speak to and when (usually a head coach at halftime, and one or two players before and after the game ends). Information on injured players or rules interpretations is relayed from NFL off-field officials to the TV producers in the truck, who then pass it along to the sideline reporters or booth announcers. Thus, CBS opted in 2006 to no longer use sideline reporters except for some playoff games. ESPN followed suit by reducing the roles of its sideline reporters in 2008. Fox hired former NFL officiating director Mike Pereira in 2010 as a rules analyst, who relays rules interpretations from Los Angeles to the games that the network covers, leaving their sideline reporters able to focus less on that role. Likewise, CBS hired retired referee Mike Carey in 2014 in the same role from New York on Sundays and the NFL Network in Culver City during Thursday Night Football games. However, he departed the network after the 2015 season and was replaced by Gene Steratore in 2018. During the 2020 season, NFL sideline reporters were instead stationed in the lower portion of seating areas due to COVID-19 protocols, with news relayed to them by team officials or off-air staffers instead.

== NFL Films ==
The NFL owns NFL Films, whose duties include providing game film to media outlets for highlights shows after a 2- to 3-day window during which outlets can use original game broadcast highlights.

== NFL+ ==
The NFL operates NFL+, a streaming service that broadcasts live out-of-market preseason games, radio broadcasts from all 32 teams and Westwood One Sports, and live in-market games on mobile devices, in addition to library programming from NFL Films and NFL Network. A premium tier allows access to on-demand game replays. It was previously known as NFL Game Pass until adopting its current name prior to the 2022 NFL season.

== International broadcasters ==
Outside the United States, NFL games are broadcast in the Americas across Canada, Mexico, Central America, and South America; as well as in Europe, Asia, Australia, and New Zealand, among others. Games can also be streamed through the NFL Game Pass International package, which is distributed by the DAZN platform.

== See also ==
- NFL Network
- NFL Sunday Ticket
- List of current National Football League broadcasters
- National Football League on Canadian television
- Major League Baseball on television
- Major League Soccer on television
- National Basketball Association on television
- National Hockey League on television

== Sources ==
- NFL ways to watch
- FOXBusiness.com – NFL Blackout Policy Angers Fans
- NFL Media Rights Deals For '07 Season
- NFL Record and Fact Book (ISBN 1-932994-36-X)
- Total Football: The Official Encyclopedia of the National Football League (ISBN 0-06-270174-6)
- America's Game: How Pro Football Captured A Nation by Michael MacCambridge (ISBN 0-375-50454-0)
- NFL to remain on broadcast TV
- NFL announces new prime-time TV packages
- CleverDonkey.com: The NFL Should Bench Its Blackout Rules
- NFL Network to televise regular-season games
- Process of game-time decisions will eliminate TV duds, create chaos by Michael Hiestand, USA Today, April 5, 2006 (Last accessed April 5, 2006)
- A Chronology of Pro Football on Television
- Gary Holmes at MediaPost looks at how the NFL continues to be a ratings draw over a 40 year span.
- Packers Live TV Telecast Rights in USA
