= James Yarbrough =

James or Jim Yarbrough may refer to:

- James C. Yarbrough, United States Army general
- Jim Yarbrough (offensive lineman) (James Kelley Yarbrough, born 1946), American football player
- Jim Yarbrough (defensive back) (James Edward Yarbrough, born 1963), American football player
- Jim Yarbrough (basketball) (born 1964), American college basketball coach
