= Jimmy Norris =

Welsh rugby union player

Jimmy Norris (born 25 July 1988, Newport, Wales) is a Welsh rugby union player. A winger, he has represented Wales at Under 19 and Under 20 level and was selected for the Wales national rugby sevens team squad in 2008.

Norris played his club rugby for Bedwas and made his debut for the Newport Gwent Dragons regional team in May 2007 against the Ospreys. In August 2009 he joined Cardiff RFC.

In the summer of 2010 Jimmy Norris had a brief stint with the Calgary Hornets Rugby Club in Calgary, Alberta, Canada. He scored 11 tries, leading the domestic competition. He was a pivotal reason the Hornets were able to win the National Championship for the 2010 season.

Norris has since begun work as a rugby and cricket coach, as well as being a physical education teacher at St Aloysius' College (Sydney) in Sydney, Australia.
