= Jeff Smith (tight end) =

American football player (born 1962)

No. 85
- Position: Tight end

Personal information
- Born: December 28, 1962 (age 63); Milan, Tennessee, U.S.
- Listed height: 6 ft 3 in (1.91 m)
- Listed weight: 240 lb (109 kg)

Career information
- High school: Milan
- College: Tennessee
- NFL draft: 1986: undrafted

Career history
- Atlanta Falcons (1986)*; New York Giants (1987)
- * Offseason or practice squad member only
- Stats at Pro Football Reference

Jeffrey Allen Smith (born December 28, 1962) is an American former professional football player who was a tight end for the New York Giants of the National Football League (NFL). He played college football for the Tennessee Volunteers.
