= Mack Cummings =

American football player (born 1959)

No. 19
- Position: Wide receiver

Personal information
- Born: March 3, 1959 (age 67); Gainesville, Florida, U.S.
- Listed height: 6 ft 0 in (1.83 m)
- Listed weight: 195 lb (88 kg)

Career information
- High school: Gainesville
- College: East Tennessee State
- NFL draft: 1983: undrafted

Career history
- Baltimore Colts (1983)*; New York Giants (1987)
- * Offseason or practice squad member only

Career NFL statistics
- Games played: 1
- Kick returns: 1
- Yards: 11
- Stats at Pro Football Reference

Mack Cummings (born March 3, 1959) is an American former professional football player who was a wide receiver for the New York Giants of the National Football League (NFL) in 1987. He played college football for the East Tennessee State Buccaneers.
