= Beau Almodobar =

American football player (born 1962)

Profile
- Position: Wide receiver

Personal information
- Born: August 4, 1962 (age 64); San Francisco, California
- Listed height: 5 ft 7 in (1.70 m)
- Listed weight: 180 lb (82 kg)

Career information
- High school: Nantucket
- College: Norwich
- NFL draft: 1986: undrafted

Career history
- Philadelphia Eagles (1986)*; New York Giants (1987)
- * Offseason or practice squad member only
- Stats at Pro Football Reference

Beau Almodobar (born October 25, 1962, in San Francisco, California) played American football in the National Football League. He played college football for the Norwich Cadets. A wide receiver, he played for only one season (1987) with the New York Giants as a replacement player. He wore jersey number 10. Almodobar is currently a physical education teacher at Cyrus Pierce Middle School in Nantucket, MA and coaches the Whalers, Nantucket High School's football team.

He was also a physical education instructor, athletic director and baseball coach at now-closed Thayer High School in Winchester, NH before moving back to Nantucket.
