= Chris Davis (linebacker) =

American football player (born 1963)

No. 95
- Position: Linebacker

Personal information
- Born: July 26, 1963 (age 63); Rahway, New Jersey, U.S.
- Listed height: 6 ft 1 in (1.85 m)
- Listed weight: 225 lb (102 kg)

Career information
- High school: Springbrook (Silver Spring, Maryland)
- College: Purdue; San Diego State
- NFL draft: 1986: undrafted

Career history
- New York Giants (1987)
- Stats at Pro Football Reference

Christopher Weldon Davis (born July 26, 1963) is an American former professional football player who was a linebacker for the New York Giants of the National Football League (NFL). He played college football for the Purdue Boilermakers and San Diego State Aztecs.
