= NFL on Canadian television =

As of the 2024 NFL season, CTV and TSN broadcast Sunday games. Monday Night Football airs exclusively on TSN. TSN and CTV 2 own rights to Sunday Night Football and Thursday Night Football. RDS carries games in the French language from all timeslots. American network television feeds may also be available, often from multiple markets, on cable and satellite (and via terrestrial broadcast in the border lands); all games are subject to simultaneous substitution. Monday Night Football also airs in simultaneous substitution with the ABC feed on CTV2 beginning with the 2023 season.

== Network overview ==
=== CBC Television ===
CBC was the original home of NFL in Canada. The games was simsubbed for 7 straight years (1972 to 1979), The Super Bowl were only simulcast from NBC and CBS via Cable. ABC broadcasts were also simsubbed for playoff use only. CBC stopped airing NFL in January 1979 where they lost to rival Global.

=== Citytv ===
Craig Media (including the Citytv stations in Winnipeg and Alberta) owned the rights to Monday Night Football in the early 2000s, and these rights moved to City for MNF's final season on ABC in 2005, before being moving again to TSN in 2006.

With the sale to Rogers, Citytv Vancouver carried late afternoon games during the 2007 season (as did OMNI.2 in Toronto), under sublicence from Rogers Sportsnet. For the 2008 season, all Citytv stations carried late afternoon games. Sportsnet carried a different game than the game broadcast by Citytv. Citytv Toronto also airs selected Buffalo Bills preseason games (including those held at the Rogers Centre).

CTV and TSN assumed rights to 4:05 pm and 4:25 pm ET games in 2014 as a result of Rogers acquiring exclusive national rights to the National Hockey League. In the 2015 season, Citytv aired some Thursday night games due to scheduling conflicts with Major League Baseball games on Sportsnet. (These games also aired on Sportsnet One.)

=== CTV Television Network ===
On May 22, 2007, it was announced that CTV had acquired the broadcast rights to the National Football League early-afternoon Sunday games, the full NFL playoffs, and the Super Bowl, effective the 2007 NFL season. This ended a lengthy association between the NFL and Global Television Network. TSN, a sports channel which CTV owns, also airs NFL games and produces the CTV broadcasts in tandem with CBS and Fox.

=== DAZN ===
As the Canadian rightsholder to NFL Game Pass and NFL Sunday Ticket, DAZN offers all preseason, regular-season (including Thursday night, Sunday night and Monday night games) and playoff games, as well as NFL RedZone.

DAZN also streams NFL Network, as well as complete coverage of marquee events like the NFL Draft and Combine.

Archived Super Bowl and NFL playoff games are also available on DAZN.

=== Global Television Network ===
Global was the longtime broadcaster of Sunday afternoon and playoff National Football League football games in Canada, beginning in 1979, simulcasting the relevant American broadcasts, an association that ended in 2007 when CTV outbid Global for the NFL broadcast package.

=== Prime Video ===
From 2017 to 2021, Prime Video held non-exclusive global streaming rights to Thursday Night Football, including in Canada. Beginning with the 2022 NFL season, Prime Video's rights are limited to the U.S. (though it is now the exclusive non-local rightsholder in that country), with Bell Media (via TSN, RDS, and CTV2) and DAZN continuing to hold Canadian rights using the Amazon-produced feed.

=== Réseau des sports ===
Bell Media's Réseau des sports (RDS) airs French-language coverage of the NFL. As with its coverage of other American sports events, RDS typically offers dubbed versions of the American game broadcasts.

=== TSN ===
TSN has been airing NFL games since 1987, and currently airs ESPN original programming, including Sunday NFL Countdown and Monday Night Football. In addition to Monday Night Football, TSN broadcasts NBC Sunday Night Football. Since the 2007 NFL season, it produces Sunday afternoon telecasts for CTV, although the feed is taken from CBS or Fox.

==== 2007 New England Patriots-New York Giants game ====
In Canada, the established sports channel TSN held the rights to the game, as it did for all NFL Network regular-season games at the time. After the NBC / CBS simulcast was announced, TSN's parent broadcast network CTV announced it too would carry the game, allowing CTV simultaneous substitution rights over American stations broadcasting the game. This meant that, in areas of eastern Canada receiving their "big three" network affiliates from Boston, the CTV signal was seen on four different basic-cable channels, in addition to TSN's broadcast (which only differed from CTV in terms of network identification and some commercials).

=== Sportsnet ===
For the 2005–2013 seasons, Sportsnet aired Sunday afternoon NFL action, splitting late games across the Pacific and West feeds, and the East and Ontario feeds. The games not shown in the opposite regions were also carried by Rogers-owned Citytv stations in Toronto, Vancouver, Calgary, Edmonton and Montreal. Sportsnet also broadcast Thursday Night Football and held rights to all Thanksgiving Day games between 2009–2016.

== NFL Sunday Ticket ==
NFL Sunday Ticket has been on the online subscription service DAZN since 2017 as well as on the following satellite and cable providers on a non-exclusive basis:

- Bell Satellite TV
- Shaw Direct
- Access Communications
- Cogeco
- Eastlink
- Rogers Cable
- Shaw Communications
- Vidéotron
- Westman Communications

Canadian Radio-television and Telecommunications Commission (CRTC) regulations prevent any cable or satellite provider from holding exclusive rights.

== See also ==
- Sports broadcasting contracts in Canada § National Football League
- List of Bills Toronto Series broadcasters
- List of Super Bowl lead-out programs#Lead-outs in Canada
