= Jim Yarbrough (defensive back) =

American football player (born 1963)

No. 45
- Position: Defensive back

Personal information
- Born: November 20, 1963 (age 62); United States
- Listed height: 6 ft 0 in (1.83 m)
- Listed weight: 195 lb (88 kg)

Career information
- High school: Fulton
- College: Murray State
- NFL draft: 1986: undrafted

Career history
- Denver Broncos (1986)*; New York Giants (1987)
- * Offseason or practice squad member only
- Stats at Pro Football Reference

James Edward Yarbrough (born November 20, 1963) is an American former professional football player who was a defensive back for the New York Giants of the National Football League (NFL). He played college football for the Murray State Racers.
