= Kaulana Park =

American football player (born 1962)

No. 39
- Position: Fullback

Personal information
- Born: June 16, 1962 (age 64); Honolulu, Hawaii, U.S.
- Listed height: 6 ft 2 in (1.88 m)
- Listed weight: 230 lb (104 kg)

Career information
- High school: Kamehameha
- College: Stanford (1982–1984)
- NFL draft: 1985: undrafted

Career history
- San Diego Chargers (1987)*; New York Giants (1987)
- * Offseason or practice squad member only
- Stats at Pro Football Reference

Kaulana Hnr Park (born June 16, 1962) is an American former professional football player who was a fullback for the New York Giants of the National Football League (NFL). He played college football for the Stanford Cardinal.

== Early life ==
Kaulana Hnr Park was born on June 16, 1962, in Honolulu, Hawaii. He attended the Kamehameha Schools Bishop Estate school system.

== College career ==
In 1981, Park played his first year of college football at Menlo School and Junior College. He then transferred to Stanford University, where he was a three-year letterman for the Stanford Cardinal from 1982 to 1984. He was a backup fullback for the majority of his college career. Park recorded college career totals of 85 carries for 285 yards and two touchdowns, and 24 receptions for 146 yards.

== Professional career ==
Park went undrafted in the 1985 NFL draft. He signed with the San Diego Chargers in 1987, but was released on August 14, 1987, after leaving the team.

On October 8, 1987, Park was signed by the New York Giants during the 1987 NFL players strike. He started two games for the Giants, rushing six times for 11 yards while also catching one pass for six yards on two targets. He was released by New York on October 19, 1987, after the strike ended.

== Personal life ==
Park later served as the director for the Department of Hawaiian Home Lands, and as the chairman for the Hawaiian Homes Commission.
