= Denver Broncos all-time roster =

1,475 players have appeared in at least one regular season or postseason game in the National Football League (NFL) or American Football League (AFL) for the Denver Broncos since 1960. This list is accurate through Week 9 of the 2026 NFL season.

== A ==
- Hamza Abdullah
- Kris Abrams-Draine
- Bob Adams
- Charlie Adams
- Mike Adams
- Sam Adams
- Ken Adamson
- Nate Adkins
- McTelvin Agim
- Allen Aldridge
- Steve Alexakos
- Elijah Alexander
- Jeff Alexander
- Kevin Alexander
- Kwon Alexander
- P. J. Alexander
- Ray Alexander
- Roc Alexander
- Stephen Alexander
- Ted Alflen
- Brandon Allen
- Buddy Allen
- Dakota Allen
- Don Allen
- Zach Allen
- Ty Allert
- Hank Allison
- Buddy Alliston
- Lyle Alzado
- Dave Ames
- Bobby Anderson
- Calvin Anderson
- C. J. Anderson
- Flipper Anderson
- Marques Anderson
- Mike Anderson
- Tycen Anderson
- Zaire Anderson
- Mitch Andrews
- Lou Andrus
- Kenny Anunike
- Lester Archambeau
- Justin Armour
- Otis Armstrong
- LeFrancis Arnold
- Mike Askea
- Bill Atkins
- Frank Atkinson
- George Atkinson
- Jeremiah Attaochu
- Steve Atwater
- Marvin Austin
- John Avery
- John Ayers
- Robert Ayers

== B ==
- Jay Bachman
- Tyler Badie
- Boss Bailey
- Champ Bailey
- Levelle Bailey
- Quinn Bailey
- Bill Bain
- Chris Baker
- Jason Baker
- Jerry Baker
- Lance Ball
- Montee Ball
- Michael Bandy
- Chris Banks
- Justin Bannan
- Mike Barber
- Allen Barbre
- Ernie Barnes
- Walt Barnes
- Dean Barnett
- Josh Barrett
- Shaquil Barrett
- Jahdae Barron
- Lamin Barrow
- Odell Barry
- Connor Barth
- Cody Barton
- Jim Barton
- Rich Baska
- Norm Bass
- Essang Bassey
- D'Anthony Batiste
- De'Vante Bausby
- Zane Beadles
- Scott Beavers
- Andrew Beck
- Jordan Beck
- Tom Beer
- Dave Behrman
- Kevin Belcher
- Henry Bell
- Josh Bell
- Ken Bell
- Mike Bell
- Tatum Bell
- LeVante Bellamy
- Scott Bentley
- Mitch Berger
- Frank Bernardi
- Lee Bernet
- Rod Bernstine
- Bertrand Berry
- Steve Beuerlein
- Kapri Bibbs
- Keishawn Bierria
- Keith Bishop
- Dré Bly
- Jacob Bobenmoyer
- Tony Boddie
- Omar Bolden
- Garett Bolles
- Nik Bonitto
- Melvin Bonner
- Devontae Booker
- Mike Boone
- A. J. Bouye
- Gordon Bowdell
- David Bowens
- Walt Bowyer
- Cory Boyd
- Greg Boyd
- Greg Bracelin
- Ronnie Bradford
- Nigel Bradham
- Philip Brady
- John Bramlett
- Sam Brandon
- Mel Bratton
- Tyrone Braxton
- Don Breaux
- Bob Breitenstein
- Aaron Brewer
- Chris Brewer
- Teddy Bridgewater
- Diyral Briggs
- Marlin Briscoe
- Bubby Brister
- Tramaine Brock
- Blake Brockermeyer
- J.W. Brodnax
- Keith Brooking
- Michael Brooks
- Robert Brooks
- Fred Broussard
- Andre Brown
- Boyd Brown
- Clay Brown
- Courtney Brown
- Cyron Brown
- Eric Brown
- Fred Brown
- Hardy Brown
- Jamie Brown
- John Brown
- Ken Brown (born 1954)
- Ken Brown (born 1971)
- Laron Brown
- Willie Brown
- Baron Browning
- Sam Brunelli
- Larry Brunson
- David Bruton
- Billy Bryan
- Steve Bryan
- Pat Bryant
- Correll Buckhalter
- Terrell Buckley
- Tom Buckman
- Fred Bukaty
- Brodrick Bunkley
- Bobby Burnett
- Keith Burns
- George Burrell
- Isaiah Burse
- Antwon Burton
- Michael Burton
- Josh Bush
- Rafael Bush
- Steve Busick
- Gerry Bussell
- Bill Butler
- Jake Butt
- Butler By'not'e
- Butch Byrd

== C ==
- Glenn Cadrez
- Andre Caldwell
- Scott Caldwell
- Austin Calitro
- Bryce Callahan
- Carter Campbell
- Jeff Campbell
- Larry Canada
- Steve Cargile
- Cooper Carlisle
- Al Carmichael
- Paul Carmichael
- Don Carothers
- Ken Carpenter
- Alphonso Carreker
- Darren Carrington
- Dwayne Carswell
- Dale Carter
- Jamal Carter
- Quinton Carter
- Rubin Carter
- Tony Carter (born 1972)
- Tony Carter (born 1986)
- James Casey
- Jurrell Casey
- Tim Casey
- John Cash
- Tom Cassese
- Jeremiah Castille
- Grady Cavness
- Byron Chamberlain
- Jamaal Charles
- Barney Chavous
- Anthony Chickillo
- Max Choboian
- Bradley Chubb
- Patrick Chukwurah
- Tom Cichowski
- Ralph Cindrich
- Ryan Clady
- Brian Clark
- Chris Clark
- Darius Clark
- Derrick Clark
- Desmond Clark
- Frank Clark
- Kelvin Clark
- Kevin Clark
- Nic Clemons
- Mike Clendenen
- Tyrie Cleveland
- Daniel Coats
- Cedric Cobbs
- Donald Coffey
- George Coghill
- Keary Colbert
- Chris Cole
- Jonah Coleman
- KaRon Coleman
- Marco Coleman
- Steve Coleman
- Tony Colorito
- Britton Colquitt
- Darren Comeaux
- Tom Compton
- Ed Cooke
- Andre Cooper
- Jonathon Cooper
- Mark Cooper
- Paul Cornick
- Kip Corrington
- Quan Cosby
- Dave Costa
- Bill Cottrell
- Curome Cox
- Jeremy Cox
- Larry Cox
- Perrish Cox
- Eric Crabtree
- River Cracraft
- Gary Crane
- Su'a Cravens
- Aaron Craver
- Jeremy Crawshaw
- Willis Crenshaw
- Jared Crick
- Ken Criter
- Damarea Crockett
- Ray Crockett
- Mike Croel
- Tim Crowder
- Frank Crum
- Ed Cummings
- Carl Cunningham
- Zach Cunningham
- Mike Current
- Scott Curtis
- Lloyd Cushenberry III
- Jay Cutler

== D ==
- Lional Dalton
- Brad Daluiso
- Bill Danenhauer
- Eldon Danenhauer
- Owen Daniels
- Stanley Daniels
- Ronald Darby
- Jeff Davidson
- Andra Davis
- Britt Davis
- C. J. Davis
- Dick Davis
- Dorsett Davis
- Eric Davis
- Jack Davis
- Marvin Davis
- Terrell Davis
- Todd Davis
- Vernon Davis
- Brian Dawkins
- Joe Dawkins
- Duke Dawson
- Al Day
- Ron Dayne
- Steve DeBerg
- Eric Decker
- Robert Delpino
- Rick Dennison
- Al Denson
- John Denvir
- A. J. Derby
- Todd Devoe
- David Diaz-Infante
- Wallace Dickey
- Bo Dickinson
- Christian DiLauro
- Bucky Dilts
- Charles Dimry
- Joe DiVito
- Hewritt Dixon
- Riley Dixon
- Zachary Dixon
- J. K. Dobbins
- Dedrick Dodge
- Kirk Dodge
- Chris Doering
- Jack Dolbin
- Matt Dominguez
- Tom Domres
- Mitch Donahue
- Vontarrius Dora
- Phillip Dorsett
- Tony Dorsett
- Lorenzo Doss
- Demar Dotson
- Gary Downs
- Dick Doyle
- Joel Dreessen
- Jeff Driskel
- Shane Dronett
- Tom Drougas
- Reuben Droughns
- Darren Drozdov
- Tom Dublinski
- Joe Dudek
- Wesley Duke
- Greg Dulcich
- Elvis Dumervil
- Rick Duncan
- Myron Dupree
- Pete Duranko

== E ==
- Kasim Edebali
- Booker Edgerson
- Chase Edmonds
- Ron Egloff
- Jim Eifrid
- Ebenezer Ekuban
- Jason Elam
- Jonah Elliss
- Luther Elliss
- John Elway
- John Embree
- John Engelberger
- Evan Engram
- Hunter Enis
- Pat Epperson
- Tom Erlandson
- Mike Ernst
- Paul Ernster
- Terry Erwin
- Audric Estimé
- Dale Evans
- Jerry Evans
- Larry Evans
- Blake Ezor

== F ==
- Stan Fanning
- Noah Fant
- Miller Farr
- Sean Farrell
- Rojesterman Farris
- Mario Fatafehi
- Daniel Fells
- James Ferentz
- Nick Ferguson
- Ronald Fields
- Steve Fitzhugh
- Joe Flacco
- Cameron Fleming
- Billy Fletcher
- Simon Fletcher
- Steve Foley
- Garrett Ford, Sr.
- Mike Ford
- Fred Forsberg
- Justin Forsett
- Alex Forsyth
- George Foster
- Bennie Fowler
- Vernon Fox
- Domonique Foxworth
- Mitchell Fraboni
- Jason Franci
- Mike Franckowiak
- Orlando Franklin
- Troy Franklin
- John Franklin-Myers
- Jim Fraser
- Al Frazier
- Mike Freeman
- Royce Freeman
- Russell Freeman
- Gus Frerotte
- Sean Fresch
- Lennie Friedman
- Sione Fua
- Travis Fulgham
- Kyle Fuller
- Randy Fuller
- Troy Fumagalli

== G ==
- Jabar Gaffney
- Thomas Gafford
- George Gaiser
- Bob Gaiters
- David Galloway
- David Gamble
- Elijah Garcia
- Max Garcia
- Jerrol Garcia-Williams
- Daryl Gardener
- Ben Garland
- Dave Garnett
- Scott Garnett
- Drake Garrett
- Olandis Gary
- Quentin Gause
- Chuck Gavin
- Ron Geater
- Jumpy Geathers
- Bob Geddes
- Jack Gehrke
- Ralph Giacomarro
- Freddie Gilbert
- Cookie Gilchrist
- Scotty Glacken
- Graham Glasgow
- Glenn Glass
- Tom Glassic
- George Goeddeke
- Ian Gold
- Goose Gonsoulin
- John Gonzaga
- Ahmad Gooden
- André Goodman
- Harvey Goodman
- D'Andre Goodwin
- Amon Gordon
- Cornell Gordon
- Darrien Gordon
- Melvin Gordon
- Richard Gordon
- Brandon Gorin
- Adam Gotsis
- Sam Graddy
- Randy Gradishar
- Gino Gradkowski
- Daniel Graham
- Tom Graham
- John Granby
- John Grant
- Paul Grasmanis
- Marsharne Graves
- J. T. Gray
- Cornell Green
- Gaston Green
- Louis Green
- Paul Green
- Virgil Green
- Willie Green
- Dre Greenlaw
- Charlie Greer
- Jim Greer
- Randy Gregory
- Brian Griese
- John Griffin
- Quentin Griffin
- Howard Griffith
- Jonas Griffith
- Bill Groman
- Chris Gronkowski
- Dan Gronkowski
- Dick Guesman
- Kevin Guidry
- Don Gulseth
- Buzz Guy

== H ==
- Brian Habib
- Dale Hackbart
- Joey Hackett
- Mike Haffner
- Britt Hager
- Mario Haggan
- Steve Haggerty
- Nate Hairston
- Ronnie Haliburton
- Andre Hall
- Darryl Hall
- Ben Hamilton
- DaeSean Hamilton
- Darrell Hamilton
- K. J. Hamler
- Wayne Hammond
- Patrick Hape
- Billy Hardee
- Mike Harden
- Anthony Harris
- Archie Harris
- Chris Harris Jr.
- Davontae Harris
- Jonathan Harris
- Quentin Harris
- Raymont Harris
- Ryan Harris
- Shelby Harris
- Steven Harris
- Dwight Harrison
- Derrick Harvey
- Maurice Harvey
- Richard Harvey
- RJ Harvey
- Harald Hasselbach
- Johnny Hatley
- Tim Hauck
- Steven Hauschka
- Art Hauser
- Wendell Hayes
- Herb Haygood
- Abner Haynes
- Mark Haynes
- Reggie Hayward
- Al Haywood
- Garrison Hearst
- Vaughn Hebron
- Temarrick Hemingway
- De'Angelo Henderson
- Wymon Henderson
- Jerry Hendren
- Brad William Henke
- Matt Henningsen
- Mitchell Henry
- Travis Henry
- Gary Henson
- Lonnie Hepburn
- Kelly Herndon
- Steve Herndon
- George Herring
- Mark Herrmann
- Jacob Hester
- Jeff Heuerman
- Bo Hickey
- Cliff Hicks
- Faion Hicks
- Buzz Highsmith
- Jack Hill
- Renaldo Hill
- Randy Hilliard
- Peyton Hillis
- Ronnie Hillman
- Tony Hills
- Kendall Hinton
- Domenik Hixon
- Russ Hochstein
- George Hoey
- John Hoffman
- Jon Hohman
- Alijah Holder
- Darius Holland
- Jeff Holland
- Montrae Holland
- Trindon Holliday
- Vonnie Holliday
- Shawn Hollingsworth
- Justin Hollins
- Gus Hollomon
- Andre Holmes
- Ron Holmes
- Gordy Holz
- Winford Hood
- Jerry Hopkins
- Mike Horan
- Don Horn
- Paul Howard
- Bobby Howfield
- John Huard
- Bob Hudson
- Talanoa Hufanga
- Michael Huff
- John Hufnagel
- Bobby Humphrey
- Lil'Jordan Humphrey
- Bob Humphreys
- Stefan Humphries
- Ricky Hunley
- Daniel Hunter
- Jason Hunter
- Glenn Hyde

== I ==
- Duke Ihenacho
- Martin Imhof
- Thomas Incoom
- Jerry Inman
- Nate Irving

== J ==
- Bernard Jackson
- Chad Jackson
- Darrell Jackson
- Jarious Jackson
- Jordan Jackson
- Kareem Jackson
- Lamar Jackson
- Larron Jackson
- Malik Jackson
- Mark Jackson
- Nate Jackson
- Rich Jackson
- Roger Jackson
- Tom Jackson
- Ray Jacobs (born 1938)
- Ray Jacobs (born 1972)
- Taylor Jacobs
- Ja'Wuan James
- Tory James
- Quentin Jammer
- Chuck Janerette
- Tom Janik
- Andy Janovich
- Pete Jaquess
- Tyrique Jarrett
- Patrick Jeffers
- Billy Jenkins
- Jim Jensen
- Timmy Jernigan
- Bill Jessup
- Gene Jeter
- Jerry Jeudy
- Josey Jewell
- Billy Joe
- Alexander Johnson
- Barry Johnson
- Brandon Johnson
- Butch Johnson
- Charley Johnson
- Chuck Johnson
- Darrius Johnson
- Earl Johnson
- Ellis Johnson
- Jamar Johnson
- Jason Johnson
- Jeremiah Johnson
- Jerry Johnson
- Kyle Johnson
- Raylee Johnson
- Reggie Johnson
- Steven Johnson
- Vance Johnson
- Tim Joiner
- Adam Jones
- Brandon Jones
- Calvin Jones
- Dante Jones
- Daryll Jones
- David Jones
- D. J. Jones
- Dominique Jones
- Dre'Mont Jones
- Ernest Jones
- Henry Jones
- Herana-Daze Jones
- James Jones
- Jimmy Jones
- Joseph Jones
- K. C. Jones
- Leonard Jones
- Nate Jones
- Rondell Jones
- Rulon Jones
- Sai'vion Jones
- Sam Jones
- Tony Jones
- Victor Jones
- LaMont Jordan
- Larry Jordan
- Don Joyce
- Seth Joyner
- Jim Juriga
- Winston Justice

== K ==
- John Kacherski
- Larry Kaminski
- Bob Kampa
- Danny Kanell
- Ken Karcher
- Rich Karlis
- Keith Kartz
- Kevin Kasper
- Kolbe Katsis
- Clarence Kay
- Bill Keating
- Case Keenum
- Mike Kellogg
- Chad Kelly
- Pat Kelly
- Kenoy Kennedy
- Eddie Kennison
- Shiloh Keo
- Crawford Ker
- Brett Kern
- Zach Kerr
- Devon Key
- Jon Keyworth
- Jim Kiick
- Darius Kilgo
- Tony Kimbrough
- Todd Kinchen
- Don King
- Marquette King
- Vince Kinney
- David Kircus
- Micah Kiser
- Bruce Klosterman
- Jeff Knapple
- Shawn Knight
- Terrance Knighton
- Micah Knorr
- Mike Knox
- Jonathan Kongbo
- Bob Konovsky
- Dan Koppen
- Cyrus Kouandjio
- Niko Koutouvides
- Greg Kragen
- Casey Kreiter
- Jim Krieg
- Henry Krieger-Coble
- Gary Kroner
- Lucas Krull
- Ray Kubala
- Gary Kubiak
- Frank Kuchta
- Chris Kuper
- Aaron Kyle

== L ==
- Matt LaCosse
- Ron Lamb
- Gordon Lambert
- Pat Lamberti
- Tyler Lancaster
- Gene Lang
- Kenard Lang
- Le-Lo Lang
- Harvey Langi
- Brendan Langley
- Ken Lanier
- Dan LaRose
- Carl Larpenter
- Spencer Larsen
- Bill Larson
- Bill Laskey
- Ike Lassiter
- Kit Lathrop
- Cody Latimer
- Don Latimer
- Ty Law
- Mike Leach
- Ronald Leary
- Jim LeClair
- Roger LeClerc
- Jacky Lee
- Larry Lee
- Zeph Lee
- Max Leetzow
- Ashley Lelie
- Mike Lemon
- Paris Lenon
- Jack Lentz
- Jim Leonhard
- Matt Lepsis
- Darrell Lester
- Leon Lett
- D. D. Lewis
- Greg Lewis
- Hal Lewis (1944)
- Jeff Lewis
- Marcedes Lewis
- Kory Lichtensteiger
- Tony Lilly
- Phillip Lindsay
- Hub Lindsey
- Steve Lindsey
- Pete Liske
- Floyd Little
- Brandon Lloyd
- Bill Lobenstein
- Drew Lock
- P. J. Locke
- Kerry Locklin
- Mike Lodish
- Dave Logan
- Derek Loville
- Calvin Lowry
- Tim Lucas
- Tommy Luke
- Triandos Luke
- Wil Lutz
- Fran Lynch
- John Lynch
- Paxton Lynch
- Anthony Lynn
- Tommy Lyons
- Rob Lytle

== M ==
- Dan MacDonald
- Marlon Mack
- Tommy Maddox
- Adrian Madise
- Don Maggs
- Josh Mallard
- Pete Mangum
- Chris Manhertz
- Peyton Manning
- Wade Manning
- Brison Manor
- Marquand Manuel
- Bobby Maples
- Laurence Maroney
- Arthur Marshall
- Brandon Marshall (born 1984)
- Brandon Marshall (born 1989)
- Chuck Marshall
- Trey Marshall
- Warren Marshall
- Paul Martha
- Jacob Martin
- Sam Martin
- Glenn Martinez
- Bobby Massie
- Rick Massie
- Billy Masters
- Damarri Mathis
- Evan Mathis
- Pat Matson
- Archie Matsos
- John Mattox
- Marv Matuszak
- Andy Maurer
- Dean May
- Ray May
- Joe Mays
- Darcel McBath
- Ryan McBean
- Ed McCaffrey
- Tanner McCalister
- Brendan McCarthy
- Kyle McCarthy
- John McCormick
- Lerentee McCray
- Marlon McCree
- Bob McCullough
- Jake McCullough
- Lawrence McCutcheon
- Orlando McDaniel
- Wahoo McDaniel
- Reggie McElroy
- Bud McFadin
- Willis McGahee
- John McGeever
- Phil McGeoghan
- Mike McGlinchey
- Chester McGlockton
- Connor McGovern
- Keli McGregor
- Travis McGriff
- Monte McGuire
- Isaiah McKenzie
- Alvin McKinley
- Kenny McKinley
- Bill McKoy
- Tim McKyer
- Jaleel McLaughlin
- Ron McLean
- Brandon McManus
- Ja'Quan McMillian
- Jim McMillin
- Bob McNamara
- Ryan McNeil
- Adam Meadows
- Karl Mecklenburg
- Bob Meeks
- Quinn Meinerz
- Jon Melander
- Mark Merrill
- Bobby Micho
- Willie Middlebrooks
- Glyn Milburn
- Hugh Millen
- Anthony Miller
- Billy Miller
- Chris Miller
- Von Miller
- Jeff Mills
- Marvin Mims
- Jeremy Mincey
- Gene Mingo
- Claudie Minor
- Tom Minter
- Andre Mintze
- Dean Miraldi
- Rex Mirich
- Alvin Mitchell
- Charley Mitchell
- Leroy Mitchell
- John Mobley
- Orson Mobley
- John Moffitt
- Mike Mohamed
- Alton Montgomery
- Marv Montgomery
- Randy Montgomery
- Scottie Montgomery
- Will Montgomery
- Mike Montler
- Alex Moore
- Bob Moore
- David Moore
- Elijah Moore
- Jason Moore
- Leroy Moore
- Rahim Moore
- Randy Moore
- Shawn Moore
- Emery Moorehead
- Fabian Moreau
- Knowshon Moreno
- Quincy Morgan
- Patrick Morris
- Craig Morton
- Haven Moses
- John Mosier
- Jarvis Moss
- Riley Moss
- Bobby Moten
- Parnell Motley
- Deiontrez Mount
- Marc Munford
- Latavius Murray
- Mark Murray
- Bill Musgrave
- Chad Mustard
- Sam Mustipher
- Netane Muti
- Chris Myers
- Michael Myers
- Wilbur Myers
- Jesse Myles
- Chip Myrtle

== N ==
- Rob Nairne
- Tom Nalen
- Damien Nash
- Marcus Nash
- Ricky Nattiel
- Joe Nedney
- Dan Neil
- Corey Nelson
- Ron Nery
- Tom Neville
- Mike Nichols
- Ben Niemann
- Bo Nix
- Taurean Nixon
- John Nocera
- Tom Nomina
- Ben Norman
- Chris Norman
- Jordan Norwood
- Phil Nugent

== O ==
- Jim O'Malley
- Deltha O'Neal
- Tom Oberg
- Riley Odoms
- Michael Ojemudia
- Russell Okung
- Albert Okwuegbunam
- Muhammad Oliver
- Eric Olsen
- Phil Olsen
- Seth Olsen
- Harold Olson
- Johnny Olszewski
- Tyler Onyedim
- Kyle Orton
- Willie Oshodin
- Brock Osweiler
- Devine Ozigbo

== P ==
- Alex Palczewski
- Anton Palepoi
- Chris Pane
- Matt Paradis
- Don Parish
- Ernie Park
- Brian Parker
- Charlie Parker
- Daren Parker
- Will Parks
- Rick Parros
- Alan Pastrana
- Aaron Patrick
- Tim Patrick
- Tito Paul
- Sam Paulescu
- Lonie Paxton
- Karl Paymah
- Russell Payne
- Erik Pears
- Matt Peart
- Jack Peavey
- Domata Peko
- Kyle Peko
- Craig Penrose
- Samaje Perine
- Jim Perkins
- Ronnie Perkins
- Lonnie Perrin
- Gerald Perry
- Michael Dean Perry
- Bob Perryman
- Anton Peters
- Kenny Peterson
- Darius Phillips
- John Phillips
- Shaun Phillips
- Lyle Pickens
- Terry Pierce
- Kavika Pittman
- Michael Pittman
- John Pitts
- Dave Pivec
- Bruce Plummer
- Jake Plummer
- Bobby Ply
- Randy Poltl
- Tyler Polumbus
- Keith Poole
- Nathan Poole
- Tyrone Poole
- Monsanto Pope
- P. J. Pope
- Kerry Porter
- Tracy Porter
- Clinton Portis
- Dickie Post
- Darryl Pounds
- Ben Powers
- Warren Powers
- Matt Prater
- Gene Prebola
- Steve Preece
- Adam Prentice
- Dave Preston
- Luke Prestridge
- Jim Price
- Errol Prisby
- Mike Pritchard
- Trevor Pryce
- Mike Purcell
- Jeb Putzier
- Johnny Pyeatt

== Q ==
- Frank Quayle
- Richard Quinn

== R ==
- Bruce Radford
- Manuel Ramirez
- Patrick Ramsey
- Steve Ramsey
- Taylor Rapp
- Shane Ray
- Wyatt Ray
- Kalif Raymond
- Montae Reagor
- Leo Reed
- Malik Reed
- Tony Reed
- Izell Reese
- Darrell Reid
- Karene Reid
- Dan Remsberg
- Josh Reynolds
- Simeon Rice
- Randy Rich
- Bob Richardson
- David Richie
- Frank Richter
- Larry Riley
- Marcus Rios
- Dalton Risner
- Reggie Rivers
- Joe Rizzo
- Malcolm Roach
- Randy Robbins
- Dewayne Robertson
- Adrian Robinson
- Curtis Robinson
- Frank Robinson
- Jeff Robinson
- Jeroy Robinson
- Lee Robinson
- Matt Robinson
- Que Robinson
- Bradley Roby
- Alden Roche
- Jake Rodgers
- Dominique Rodgers-Cromartie
- Ruben Rodriguez
- Bill Roehnelt
- Roderick Rogers
- Stan Rogers
- Dave Rolle
- Bill Romanowski
- Al Romine
- Dante Rosario
- Barry Rose
- Oliver Ross
- Tobin Rote
- Tom Rouen
- Justin Rowland
- John Rowser
- Eddie Royal
- Ahtyba Rubin
- Martin Rudolph
- Mike Ruether
- Steve Russ
- Cliff Russell
- Darryl Russell
- Derek Russell
- Leonard Russell
- Taylor Russolino
- Johnny Rutledge
- Jim Ryan
- Tom Rychlec
- Brett Rypien

== S ==
- George Saimes
- Ephraim Salaam
- Harvey Salem
- Ty Sambrailo
- Clint Sampson
- Drew Sanders
- Emmanuel Sanders
- Glenell Sanders
- Cecil Sapp
- Eric Saubert
- Todd Sauerbrun
- John Sawyer
- Ronald Sbranti
- Bob Scarpitto
- Carl Schaukowitch
- Tony Scheffler
- Steve Schindler
- Mark Schlereth
- Austin Schlottmann
- Mike Schnitker
- Michael Schofield
- Cody Schrader
- Bill Schultz
- John Schultz
- Lew Scott
- Kirk Scrafford
- Jimmy Sears
- Goldie Sellers
- Coty Sensabaugh
- Jeff Severson
- Steve Sewell
- Don Shackelford
- Hunter Sharp
- Rick Sharp
- Shannon Sharpe
- George Shaw
- Josh Shaw
- Richard Shelton
- Trent Sherfield
- Rod Sherman
- Mike Sherrard
- Roger Shoals
- Jeff Shoate
- Laval Short
- Trevor Siemian
- Sealver Siliga
- David Sills
- Jerry Simmons
- Justin Simmons
- Leon Simmons
- Chris Simms
- Mike Simone
- Jackie Simpson
- Alex Singleton
- Deyon Sizer
- JL Skinner
- John Sklopan
- Mickey Slaughter
- Tom Smiley
- Aaron Smith
- Alphonso Smith
- Antonio Smith
- Art Smith
- Ben Smith
- Dan Smith
- Dennis Smith
- Detron Smith
- Don Smith
- Ed Smith
- Elliot Smith
- Hal Smith
- Jimmy Smith
- Keidron Smith
- Le Kevin Smith
- Matt Smith
- Monte Smith
- Neil Smith
- Paul Smith (born 1945)
- Paul Smith (born 1978)
- Perry Smith
- Quanterus Smith
- Rod Smith
- Sammie Smith
- Tremon Smith
- Tre'Quan Smith
- Willie Smith
- Matt Snorton
- Kevin Snyder
- Brian Sochia
- Roland Solomon
- Henry Sorrell
- Diontae Spencer
- Jimmy Spencer
- Marquiss Spencer
- Donnie Spragan
- Rich Stachowski
- Jerry Stalcup
- Tim Stallworth
- Scott Stankavage
- Larry Steele
- Fred Steinfort
- Shamar Stephen
- Donald Stephenson
- Caden Sterns
- Darian Stewart
- Jeremy Stewart
- Jarrett Stidham
- James Stinnette
- Jesse Stokes
- Brandon Stokley
- Donnie Stone
- Otto Stowe
- Bob Stransky
- Dave Strickland
- Justin Strnad
- Deon Strother
- Dave Studdard
- Jerry Sturm
- Nick Subis
- John Sullins
- Don Summers
- Jim Summers
- Patrick Surtain II
- Jason Suttle
- Courtland Sutton
- Freddie Swain
- Charles Swann
- Shane Swanson
- Harry Swayne
- Neal Sweeney
- Bob Swenson
- Eugene Sykes
- Jashon Sykes
- Jim Szymanski

== T ==
- Aqib Talib
- Ralph Tamm
- Jacob Tamme
- Maa Tanuvasa
- George Tarasovic
- Jerry Tarr
- Pita Taumoepenu
- Alphonso Taylor
- Jamar Taylor
- Jordan Taylor
- Kitrick Taylor
- Lionel Taylor
- Reese Taylor
- Trey Teague
- Tim Tebow
- Steve Tensi
- David Terrell
- Jim Thibert
- Calvin Thomas
- Demaryius Thomas
- Dymonte Thomas
- Earlie Thomas
- Eric Thomas
- J. T. Thomas
- Julius Thomas
- Marcus Thomas
- Shamarko Thomas
- Zach Thomas
- Anthony Thompson
- Arland Thompson
- Bill Thompson
- Bob Thompson
- Broderick Thompson
- Jim Thompson
- Juwan Thompson
- Syd'Quan Thompson
- Calvin Throckmorton
- Cedric Tillman
- Dondrea Tillman
- Dave Tobey
- Kevin Toliver
- Eric Tomlinson
- Ryan Torain
- Andre Townsend
- Adam Trautman
- Austin Traylor
- Keith Traylor
- Jerry Traynham
- David Treadwell
- Danny Trevathan
- Steve Trimble
- Frank Tripucka
- Jeff Tupper
- Godwin Turk
- Billy Turner
- Clem Turner
- Jim Turner
- Jordan Turner
- Scott Turner
- Delarrin Turner-Yell
- Derrek Tuszka
- Melvin Tuten
- Maurice Tyler
- Dick Tyson

== U ==
- Keith Uecker
- Artie Ulmer
- Olen Underwood
- Mitch Unrein
- Rick Upchurch
- Eyioma Uwazurike

== V ==
- Steve Vallos
- Billy Van Heusen
- Nick Vannett
- Bradlee Van Pelt
- Louis Vasquez
- Bob Vaughn
- Cassius Vaughn
- Demetrin Veal
- David Veikune
- Tony Veland
- Jared Veldheer
- Devaughn Vele
- Chris Verhulst
- Kevin Vickerson
- Jalen Virgil
- Lloyd Voss

== W ==
- Jaylen Waddle
- Barrington Wade
- Bob Wade
- Colby Wadman
- Corliss Waitman
- Clarence Walker
- DeMarcus Walker
- Denard Walker
- Javon Walker
- Kenny Walker
- Vance Walker
- Levi Wallace
- Garret Wallow
- Lenny Walls
- J. D. Walton
- T. J. Ward
- DeMarcus Ware
- Gerard Warren
- Ty Warren
- Dave Washington (born 1940)
- Dave Washington (born 1948)
- Dwayne Washington
- Gene Washington
- Keith Washington
- Lionel Washington
- Marvin Washington
- Montrell Washington
- Ted Washington
- Blake Watson
- Chris Watson
- Dekoda Watson
- Josh Watson
- Menelik Watson
- Steve Watson
- Luke Wattenberg
- Darius Watts
- Nate Wayne
- Stephen Weatherly
- Kayvon Webster
- Nate Webster
- Darrion Weems
- Norris Weese
- Ted Wegert
- Jack Weil
- Kristian Welch
- Wes Welker
- Bill West
- Charlie West
- Willie West
- Max Wettstein
- Jim Whalen
- Andre White
- Jim White
- Taylor Whitley
- Dave Widell
- Doug Widell
- Casey Wiegmann
- Ray Wilborn
- Jonathan Wilhite
- Elijah Wilkinson
- Gerald Willhite
- Alfred Williams
- Dan Williams
- Darrent Williams
- DeShawn Williams
- D. J. Williams
- Jack Williams
- Jamal Williams
- Javonte Williams
- K'Waun Williams
- Seth Williams
- Sylvester Williams
- Wandy Williams
- Matt Willis
- Al Wilson
- Nemiah Wilson
- Russell Wilson
- Steve Wilson
- Troy Wilson
- Jamie Winborn
- Sammy Winder
- Juwann Winfree
- Billy Winn
- Bryant Winn
- Derek Wolfe
- Dick Wood
- Lee Woodall
- Ken Woodard
- Ray Woodard
- Chris Woods
- Wesley Woodyard
- James Wright
- Jim Wright
- Lonnie Wright
- Louis Wright
- Dave Wyman

== Y ==
- Bill Yelverton
- Isaac Yiadom
- Bob Young
- Chris Young
- Joe Young
- Kenny Young
- Mike Young
- Selvin Young

== Z ==
- Bob Zeman
- Gary Zimmerman
