= 1987 Denver Broncos season =

American football team season

- Owner: Pat Bowlen
- General manager: John Beake
- Head coach: Dan Reeves
- Offensive coordinator: Mike Shanahan
- Defensive coordinator: Joe Collier
- Home stadium: Mile High Stadium

Results
- Record: 10–4–1
- Division place: 1st AFC West
- Playoffs: Won Divisional Playoffs (vs. Oilers) 34–10; Won AFC Championship (vs. Browns) 38–33; Lost Super Bowl XXII (vs. Redskins) 10–42
- Pro Bowlers: QB John Elway; G Keith Bishop; LB Karl Mecklenburg

Uniform
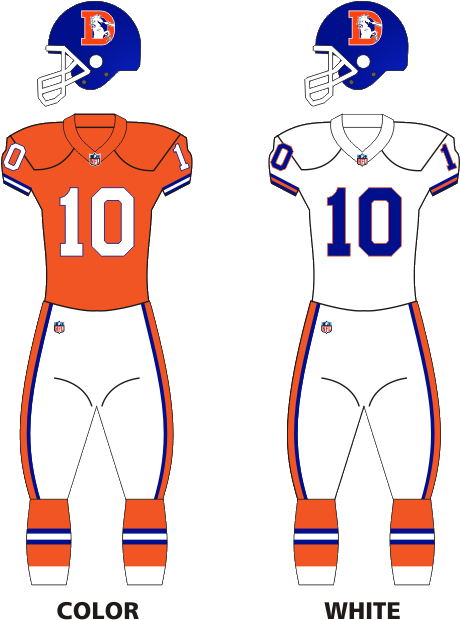

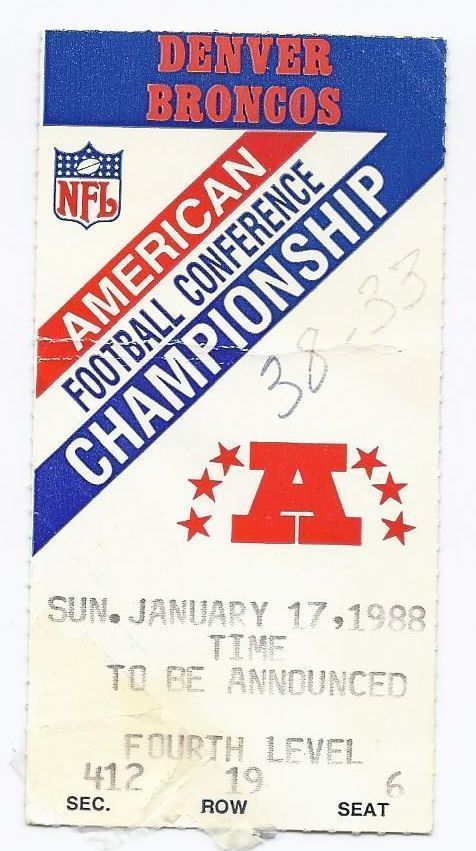
A ticket for the AFC Championship Game between the Browns and the Broncos.

The 1987 Denver Broncos season was the team's 28th year in professional football and its 18th with the National Football League (NFL). Games scheduled during the third week of the season were cancelled, and games played from weeks 4 to 6 were played with replacement teams. The Broncos finished first in the AFC West, and were AFC champions for the second straight year. Quarterback John Elway was voted league MVP for 1987. The Broncos reached the Super Bowl for the second consecutive season, but lost for the second straight time, 42–10 to the Washington Redskins.

== Offseason ==
=== NFL draft ===
1987 Denver Broncos draft
Round	Pick	Player	Position	College	Notes
1	27	Ricky Nattiel	Wide receiver	Florida	
3	84	Michael Brooks *	Linebacker	Louisiana State	
4	111	Marc Munford	Linebacker	Nebraska	
6	167	Warren Marshall	Running back	James Madison	
7	194	Wilbur Strozier	Tight end	Georgia	
8	222	Dan Morgan	Guard	Penn State	
9	250	Bruce Plummer	Center	Mississippi State	
10	278	Rafe Wilkinson	Linebacker	Richmond	
11	299	Steve Roberts	Defensive end	Washington	
11	306	Tommy Neal	Running back	Maryland	
12	334	Tyrone Braxton *	Safety	North Dakota State	
Made roster † Pro Football Hall of Fame * Made at least one Pro Bowl during career

== Personnel ==
=== Staff ===
1987 Denver Broncos staff
Front office: President and chief executive officer – Pat Bowlen; General manager – John Beake; Director of player personnel – Reed Johnson; Director of pro personnel – Lide Huggins; Head coaches: Vice president/head coach – Dan Reeves; Assistant head coach/defense – Joe Collier; Special assistant – Marvin Bass; Offensive coaches: Offensive coordinator/quarterbacks – Mike Shanahan; Running backs – Nick Nicolau; Wide receivers/tight ends – Chan Gailey; Offensive line – Alex Gibbs	Defensive coaches: Defensive line – Stan Jones; Assistant defensive line – Rubin Carter; Linebackers – Myrel Moore; Defensive backs – Charlie West; Special teams coaches: Special teams – Mike Nolan; Strength and conditioning: Strength/conditioning – Al Miller

=== Roster ===
1987 Denver Broncos roster
Quarterbacks (QB): 7 John Elway; 12 Ken Karcher; 8 Gary Kubiak; Running backs (RB): 35 Ken Bell; 24 Tony Boddie; 33 Gene Lang; 29 Warren Marshall; 46 Bobby Micho; 23 Sammy Winder; Wide receivers (WR): 83 Sam Graddy; 80 Mark Jackson; 82 Vance Johnson; 84 Ricky Nattiel; 81 Steve Watson; Tight ends (TE): 89 Mitch Andrews; 88 Clarence Kay; 89 Orson Mobley	Offensive linemen (OL): 54 Keith Bishop G; 62 Mike Freeman C/G; 79 Stefan Humphries G; 72 Keith Kartz T; 76 Ken Lanier T; 68 Larry Lee C; 74 Dan Remsberg T; 70 Dave Studdard T; Defensive linemen (DL): 65 Walt Bowyer DE; 79 Steve Bryan DE; 90 Freddie Gilbert DE; 75 Rulon Jones DE; 71 Greg Kragen NT; 61 Andre Townsend DE	Linebackers (LB): 56 Michael Brooks OLB; 55 Rick Dennison ILB; 73 Simon Fletcher OLB; 98 Ricky Hunley ILB; 97 Bruce Klosterman ILB; 58 Tim Lucas OLB; 77 Karl Mecklenburg ILB; 51 Marc Munford ILB; 50 Jim Ryan OLB; Defensive backs (DB): 34 Tyrone Braxton SS; 28 Jeremiah Castille CB; 27 Kevin Clark CB; 31 Mike Harden CB; 36 Mark Haynes CB; 22 Tony Lilly FS; 38 Bruce Plummer CB; 45 Steve Wilson CB; Special teams (ST): 2 Mike Horan P; 3 Rich Karlis K	Practice squad: None - Vacant; Reserve: 53 Dave Baran G/T (IR); 64 Billy Bryan C (IR); 69 Tony Colorito NT (IR); 78 Winford Hood G (IR); -- Paul Howard G (PUP); 20 Daryll Jones S (IR); 66 Jim Juriga T (IR); 85 Rick Massie WR (IR); 93 Richard Reed LB (IR); 48 Randy Robbins S (IR); 30 Steve Sewell RB (IR); 49 Dennis Smith S (IR); -- Rafe Wilkinson LB (IR); 47 Gerald Willhite RB (IR); Rookies in italics 50 active, 14 reserve, 0 practice squad

=== NFL replacement players ===
After the league decided to use replacement players during the NFLPA strike, the following team was assembled:

1987 Denver Broncos replacement roster
Quarterbacks: 26 Marshall Barnes; 12 Ken Karcher; 14 Dean May; 16 Monte McGuire; Running backs: 28 Scott Caldwell; 32 Joe Dudek; 34 Walt Goffigan; 41 Zeph Lee; 43 Bruce McIntyre; 24 Percy Keith; 29 John Sterling; 42 Mark Templeton; Wide receivers: 82 Laron Brown; 84 Eric Hodges; 83 Rick Massie; 87 Michel James; 80 Shane Swanson; 4 Bob Thompson; Tight ends: 86 Mitch Andrews; 89 Kerry Locklin; 88 Russell Payne; 85 Erich Rumple	Offensive linemen: 73 Kevin Belcher T; -- Robin Ham; 76 Archie Harris T; 69 David Jones; 71 Jack Peavey C; 60 Rick Pryor; 66 Carlos Scott; -- Tyrone Sorrells; 61 Isaac Williams; Defensive linemen: -- Kyle Ambrose; 79 Steve Bryan; 65 Theron Harrison; 74 Bill Lobenstein DE; 68 Ron McLean; 91 Jeff Tupper DE; 99 Ray Woodard; 77 Mitchell Young	Linebackers: 51 Stan David; 59 Kirk Dodge; 95 Tim Joiner; 56 Mike Knox; 58 Tim Lucas; 52 Dan MacDonald; 57 Matt Smith; 55 Bryant Winn; Defensive backs: 27 Kevin Clark; 37 Steve Fitzhugh; 25 Roger Jackson; 20 Daryll Jones; 45 Leonard Jones; 40 Martin Rudolph; 39 Darryl Russell; 38 Larry Shepherd; 46 Kennedy Webster; Special teams: 15 Mike Clendenen K; 6 Ralph Giacomarro P; 19 John Pieper

== Regular season ==
=== Schedule ===
Week	Date	Opponent	Result	Record	Venue	Attendance
1	September 13	**Seattle Seahawks**	**W** 40–17	1–0	Mile High Stadium	75,999
2	September 20	at Green Bay Packers	**T** 17–17 (OT)	1–0–1	Milwaukee County Stadium	50,624
3	September 28	at Cleveland Browns	canceled	1–0–1	Cleveland Stadium	
4	October 4	Houston Oilers	**L** 10–40	1–1–1	Mile High Stadium	38,494
5	October 12	**Los Angeles Raiders**	**W** 30–14	2–1–1	Mile High Stadium	61,230
6	October 18	at **Kansas City Chiefs**	**W** 26–17	3–1–1	Arrowhead Stadium	20,296
7	October 26	at Minnesota Vikings	**L** 27–34	3–2–1	Hubert H. Humphrey Metrodome	51,011
8	November 1	Detroit Lions	**W** 34–0	4–2–1	Mile High Stadium	75,172
9	November 8	at Buffalo Bills	**L** 14–21	4–3–1	Rich Stadium	63,698
10	November 16	Chicago Bears	**W** 31–29	5–3–1	Mile High Stadium	75,783
11	November 22	at **Los Angeles Raiders**	**W** 23–17	6–3–1	Los Angeles Memorial Coliseum	61,318
12	November 29	at **San Diego Chargers**	**W** 31–17	7–3–1	Jack Murphy Stadium	61,880
13	December 6	New England Patriots	**W** 31–20	8–3–1	Mile High Stadium	75,795
14	December 13	at **Seattle Seahawks**	**L** 21–28	8–4–1	Kingdome	61,759
15	December 19	**Kansas City Chiefs**	**W** 20–17	9–4–1	Mile High Stadium	75,053
16	December 27	**San Diego Chargers**	**W** 24–0	10–4–1	Mile High Stadium	21,189
Note: Intra-division opponents are in **bold** text.

=== Game summaries ===
==== Week 1 ====
Team	1	2	3	4	Total
Seahawks	14	3	0	0	17
• Broncos	7	13	14	6	40

- Date: September 17
- Location: Mile High Stadium
- Game start: 2:00 p.m. MST
- Game attendance: 75,999
- Referee: Red Cashion
- TV announcers (NBC): Dick Enberg and Merlin Olsen

Scoring summary
Q1	SEA	Turner 20 yard pass from Krieg (Johnson kick)	SEA 7–0
Q1	DEN	Sewell 72 yard pass from Elway (Karlis kick)	Tie 7–7
Q1	SEA	Warner 10 yard pass from Krieg (Johnson kick)	SEA 14–7
Q2	SEA	Johnson 25 yard field goal	SEA 17–7
Q2	DEN	Karlis 37 yard field goal	SEA 17–10
Q2	DEN	Karlis 42 yard field goal	SEA 17–13
Q2	DEN	Watson 4 yard pass from Elway (Karlis kick)	DEN 20–17
Q3	DEN	Mobley 5 yard pass from Elway (Karlis kick)	DEN 27–17
Q3	DEN	Johnson 59 yard pass from Elway (Karlis kick)	DEN 34–17
Q4	DEN	Karlis 25 yard field goal	DEN 37–17
Q4	DEN	Karlis 29 yard field goal	DEN 40–17

- John Elway 22/32, 338 Yds, 4 TD, INT

==== Week 2 ====
Team	1	2	3	4	OT	Total
Broncos	0	3	7	7	0	17
Packers	7	7	0	3	0	17

- Date: September 20
- Location: Milwaukee County Stadium
- Referee: Dick Hantak
- Television network: NBC

==== Week 4 ====
Team	1	2	3	4	Total
• Oilers	7	10	10	13	40
Broncos	0	10	0	0	10

- Date: October 4
- Location: Mile High Stadium
- Referee: Jim Tunney
- Television network: NBC

==== Week 5 ====
Team	1	2	3	4	Total
Raiders	0	14	0	0	14
• Broncos	14	3	6	7	30

- Date: October 12
- Location: Mile High Stadium
- Game start: 7:00 p.m. MST
- Game attendance: 61,230
- Game weather: 53 °F (12 °C); wind 7 mph (11 km/h)
- Referee: Fred Silva
- TV announcers (ABC): Al Michaels, Frank Gifford, and Dan Dierdorf

Scoring summary
Q1	DEN	Dudek 7 yard run (Clendenen kick)	DEN 7–0
Q1	DEN	Dudek 3 yard run (Clendenen kick)	DEN 14–0
Q2	LA	Perry 3 yard pass from Evans (Hardy kick)	DEN 14–7
Q2	LA	Calhoun 55 yard interception return (Hardy kick)	Tie 14–14
Q2	DEN	Clendenen 31 yard field goal	DEN 17–14
Q3	DEN	Massie 10 yard pass from Karcher (kick failed)	DEN 23–14
Q4	DEN	Poole 1 yard run (Clendenen kick)	DEN 30–14

==== Week 6 ====
Team	1	2	3	4	Total
• Broncos	9	10	0	7	26
Chiefs	7	7	3	0	17

- Date: October 18
- Location: Arrowhead Stadium
- Referee: Jerry Markbreit
- TV announcers (NBC): Don Criqui and Bob Trumpy

==== Week 7 ====
Team	1	2	3	4	Total
Broncos	7	10	0	10	27
• Vikings	7	7	13	7	34

- Date: October 26
- Location: Hubert H. Humphrey Metrodome
- Referee: Tom Dooley
- TV announcers (ABC): Gary Bender and Lynn Swann

==== Week 8 ====
Team	1	2	3	4	Total
Lions	0	0	0	0	0
• Broncos	17	7	0	10	34

- Date: November 1
- Location: Mile High Stadium
- Referee: Jerry Seeman
- Television network: CBS

==== Week 9 ====
Team	1	2	3	4	Total
Broncos	0	0	7	7	14
• Bills	0	18	3	0	21

- Date: November 8
- Location: Rich Stadium
- Referee: Dick Jorgensen
- Television network: NBC

==== Week 10 ====
Team	1	2	3	4	Total
Bears	14	0	15	0	29
• Broncos	0	21	0	10	31

- Date: November 16
- Location: Mile High Stadium
- Referee: Red Cashion
- TV announcers (ABC): Al Michaels, Frank Gifford, Dan Dierdorf

==== Week 11 ====
Team	1	2	3	4	Total
• Broncos	10	10	0	3	23
Raiders	0	14	3	0	17

- Date: November 22
- Location: Los Angeles Memorial Coliseum
- Referee: Jim Tunney
- TV announcers (NBC): Dick Enberg and Merlin Olsen

Scoring summary
Q1	DEN	Karlis 49 yard field goal	DEN 3–0
Q1	DEN	Johnson 24 yard pass from Elway (Karlis kick)	DEN 10–0
Q2	DEN	Karlis 31 yard field goal	DEN 13–0
Q2	LA	Jackson 35 yard run (Bahr kick)	DEN 13–7
Q2	DEN	Elway 1 yard run (Karlis kick)	DEN 20–7
Q2	LA	Jackson 1 yard run (Bahr kick)	DEN 20–14
Q3	LA	Bahr 34 yard field goal pass	DEN 20–17
Q4	DEN	Karlis 20 yard field goal	DEN 23–17

==== Week 12 ====
Team	1	2	3	4	Total
• Broncos	7	10	14	0	31
Chargers	7	3	0	7	17

- Date: November 29
- Location: Jack Murphy Stadium
- Referee: Gene Barth
- TV announcers (NBC): Charlie Jones and Jimmy Cefalo

==== Week 13 ====
Team	1	2	3	4	Total
Patriots	7	10	3	0	20
• Broncos	0	3	14	14	31

- Date: December 6
- Location: Mile High Stadium
- Referee: Fred Silva
- TV announcers (NBC): Dick Enberg and Merlin Olsen

Scoring summary
Q1	NE	Dupard 10 yard run (Franklin kick)	NE 7–0
Q2	DEN	Karlis 24 yard field goal	NE 7–3
Q2	NE	Collins 4 yard pass from Ramsey (Franklin kick)	NE 14–3
Q2	NE	Franklin 36 yard field goal	NE 17–3
Q3	DEN	Boddie 1 yard run (Karlis kick)	NE 17–10
Q3	DEN	Massie 7 yard pass from Elway (Karlis kick)	Tied 17–17
Q3	NE	Franklin 27 yard field goal	NE 20–17
Q4	DEN	Jackson 2 yard pass from Elway (Karlis kick)	DEN 24–20
Q4	DEN	Haynes 14 yard interception return (Karlis kick)	DEN 31–20

==== Week 14 ====
Team	1	2	3	4	Total
Broncos	0	0	14	7	21
• Seahawks	0	14	7	7	28

- Date: December 13
- Location: Kingdome
- Game weather: Indoors (dome)
- Referee: Bob McElwee
- Television network: ESPN

Scoring summary
Q2	5:50	SEA	Warner 3 yard run (Johnson kick)	SEA 7–0
Q2	0:22	SEA	Butler 35 yard pass from Krieg (Johnson kick)	SEA 14–0
Q3	12:28	DEN	Winder 11 yard run (Karlis kick)	SEA 14–7
Q3	10:36	DEN	Massie 39 yard pass from Elway (Karlis kick)	Tied 14–14
Q3	9:30	SEA	Butler 40 yard pass from Krieg (Johnson kick)	SEA 21–14
Q4	12:39	SEA	Williams 7 yard pass from Krieg (Johnson kick)	SEA 28–14
Q4	0:25	DEN	Winder 1 yard run (Karlis kick)	SEA 28–21

==== Week 15 ====
Team	1	2	3	4	Total
Chiefs	0	3	7	7	17
• Broncos	7	10	3	0	20

- Date: December 19
- Location: Mile High Stadium

==== Week 16 ====
Team	1	2	3	4	Total
Chargers	0	0	0	0	0
• Broncos	14	0	0	10	24

- Date: December 27
- Location: Mile High Stadium
- Referee: Fred Silva
- TV announcers (NBC): Charlie Jones and Jimmy Cefalo

Scoring summary
Q1	DEN	Clark 71 yard punt return	DEN 7–0
Q1	DEN	Winder 1 yard rush (Karlis kick)	DEN 14–0
Q4	DEN	Karlis 26 yard field goal	DEN 17–0
Q4	DEN	Hunley 52 yard interception return (Karlis kick)	DEN 24–0

=== Standings ===
AFC West
	W	L	T	PCT	DIV	CONF	PF	PA	STK
^{(1)} Denver Broncos	10	4	1	.700	7–1	8–3	379	288	W2
^{(5)} Seattle Seahawks	9	6	0	.600	4–3	5–6	371	314	L1
San Diego Chargers	8	7	0	.533	3–4	6–7	253	317	L6
Los Angeles Raiders	5	10	0	.333	2–6	3–8	301	289	L3
Kansas City Chiefs	4	11	0	.267	3–5	3–9	273	388	W1

== Playoffs ==
Round	Date	Opponent (seed)	Result	Record	Venue	Attendance
Divisional	January 10, 1988	Houston Oilers (4)	W 34–10	1–0	Mile High Stadium	75,968
AFC Championship	January 17, 1988	Cleveland Browns (2)	W 38–33	2–0	Mile High Stadium	75,993
Super Bowl XXII	January 31, 1988	Washington Redskins (N3)	L 10–42	2–1	Jack Murphy Stadium	73,302

=== Divisional ===
Team	1	2	3	4	Total
Oilers	0	3	0	7	10
• Broncos	14	10	3	7	34

- Date: January 10
- Location: Mile High Stadium

Broncos go to the AFC Championship Game and win to the Browns 38-33 but lost in Super Bowl XXII to the Redskins 42-10.

=== Conference Championship ===
Team	1	2	3	4	Total
Browns	0	3	21	9	33
• Broncos	14	7	10	7	38

- Date: January 17
- Location: Mile High Stadium

Broncos go to Super Bowl XXII but lost to the Redskins 42-10.

=== Super Bowl ===
Team	1	2	3	4	Total
• Redskins	0	35	0	7	42
Broncos	10	0	0	0	10

- Date: January 31
- Location: Jack Murphy Stadium

Broncos lost and in 1988 missed the playoffs 8-8.

== Awards and records ==
- Ricky Nattiel, All-Rookie selection
