= 1988 Denver Broncos season =

American football team season

- Owner: Pat Bowlen
- General manager: John Beake
- Head coach: Dan Reeves
- Offensive coordinator: Mike Shanahan
- Defensive coordinator: Joe Collier
- Home stadium: Mile High Stadium

Results
- Record: 8–8
- Division place: 2nd AFC West
- Playoffs: Did not qualify

Uniform
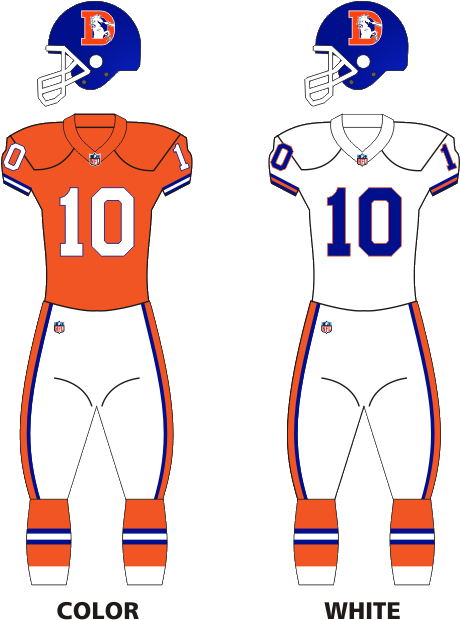

The 1988 season was the Denver Broncos' 29th year in professional football and its 19th with the National Football League (NFL). The Broncos entered the season as two-time defending AFC champions and looked to advance to the Super Bowl for the third consecutive season. The Broncos were led by Dan Reeves, their head coach, in his eighth season at this position as well as for the team. Future Hall of Fame quarterback John Elway came into the season as the reigning MVP, the only time he won this award in his career. After losing back-to-back Super Bowls, the Broncos added future Hall of Fame running back Tony Dorsett through a trade in the offseason. There was hope that he would contribute to the ground game and help them cross the threshold to win a Super Bowl. The trade brought the 34-year-old running back to Denver for a conditional 5th-round pick (WFAA).

Despite the upgrade, having the reigning MVP, and having gone to two straight Super Bowls, the Broncos missed the playoffs and finished with an 8–8 record, second to the Seattle Seahawks in their division. Injuries, a bad run game, and a poor defense all contributed to the disappointing season (LATimes). John Elway had a down year after his MVP win, throwing more interceptions than touchdowns. The trade for Tony Dorsett did not work out as both he and Sammy Winder, the second-string running back, finished with inefficient running at under four yards per carry.

After the season, the last remaining Bronco from their Super Bowl XII team, offensive lineman Billy Bryan, retired, ending a 12-year era for the team. The lackluster defense, which included ranking 28th against the run, ended in the firing of defensive coordinator Joe Collier at the same time. Joe Collier spent nineteen seasons with the team, being the mastermind behind the famed 'Orange Crush Defense' of the late 1970s and early 1980s (Deardo).

== Off season ==
=== NFL draft ===
1988 Denver Broncos draft
| Round | Pick | Player | Position | College | Notes |
| 1 | 26 | Ted Gregory | NT | Syracuse | |
| 2 | 45 | Gerald Perry | Tackle | Southern University | |
| 3 | 79 | Kevin Guidry | Cornerback | LSU | |
| 5 | 136 | Corris Ervin | DB | Central Florida | |
| 7 | 174 | Pat Kelly | TE | Syracuse | |
| 7 | 192 | Garry Frank | Guard | Mississippi State | |
| 9 | 248 | Mel Farr Jr. | Running back | UCLA | |
| 10 | 268 | Channing Williams | RB | Arizona State | |
| 11 | 304 | Shaun Grady | RB | Duke | |
| 12 | 332 | Michael Rhyan | QB | Cal State Fullerton | |
Made roster † Pro Football Hall of Fame * Made at least one Pro Bowl during career

=== Undrafted free agents ===
1988 undrafted free agents of note
| Player | Position | College |
|---|---|---|
| Bryan Barker | Punter | Santa Clara |

== Personnel ==
=== Staff / Coaches ===
1988 Denver Broncos staff
| Front office: President and chief executive officer – Pat Bowlen; General manager – John Beake; Director of player personnel – Reed Johnson; Director of pro personnel – Lide Huggins; Head coaches: Vice president/head coach – Dan Reeves; Assistant head coach/defense – Joe Collier; Special assistant – Marvin Bass; Offensive coaches: Quarterbacks – Chan Gailey; Running backs – Mo Forte; Wide receivers – Larry Kennan; Tight ends/assistant offensive line – Pete Mangurian; Offensive line – George Henshaw | Defensive coaches: Defensive line – Stan Jones; Assistant defensive line – Rubin Carter; Linebackers – Myrel Moore; Defensive backs – Charlie West; Special teams coaches: Special teams/assistant linebackers – Mike Nolan; Special teams/assistant defensive backs – Charlie Waters; Strength and conditioning: Strength/conditioning – Al Miller |

=== Roster ===
1988 Denver Broncos roster
| Quarterbacks (QB): 7 John Elway; 12 Ken Karcher; 8 Gary Kubiak; Running backs (RB): 35 Ken Bell KR; 33 Tony Dorsett; 30 Steve Sewell; 23 Sammy Winder FB; Wide receivers (WR): 80 Mark Jackson; 87 Jason Johnson KR; 82 Vance Johnson; 84 Ricky Nattiel; Tight ends (TE): 88 Clarence Kay; 86 Pat Kelly; 89 Orson Mobley | Offensive linemen (OL): 54 Keith Bishop; 64 Billy Bryan C; 78 Winford Hood T; 66 Jim Juriga G/T; 72 Keith Kartz G; 76 Ken Lanier T; 60 Gerald Perry G; 57 Mike Ruether C; 70 Dave Studdard T; Defensive linemen (DL): 65 Walt Bowyer DE; 90 Freddie Gilbert DE; 75 Rulon Jones DE; 99 Shawn Knight NT; 71 Greg Kragen NT; 61 Andre Townsend DE | Linebackers (LB): 56 Michael Brooks OLB; 95 Steve Bryan ILB; 55 Rick Dennison ILB; 73 Simon Fletcher OLB; 59 Tim Lucas OLB; 77 Karl Mecklenburg ILB; 51 Marc Munford ILB; 50 Jim Ryan LB; Defensive backs (DB): 34 Tyrone Braxton CB; 28 Jeremiah Castille CB; 37 Kevin Guidry CB; 31 Mike Harden FS; 36 Mark Haynes CB; 48 Randy Robbins SS; 49 Dennis Smith SS; 45 Steve Wilson CB; Special teams (ST): 2 Mike Horan P; 3 Rich Karlis K | Practice squad: None - Vacant; Reserve: 40 Jeff Alexander FB (IR); 25 Kip Corrington S (IR); 83 Sam Graddy WR (IR); 79 Stefan Humphries G (IR); 97 Bruce Klosterman LB (IR); 85 Rick Massie WR (IR); 74 Andrew Provence DT (IR); 94 Randy Thornton LB (IR); 81 Steve Watson WR (IR); 47 Gerald Willhite (IR); Rookies in italics 47 active, 10 reserve, 0 practice squad |

== Schedule ==
| Week | Date | Opponent | Result | Record | Venue | Attendance |
|---|---|---|---|---|---|---|
| 1 | September 4 | **Seattle Seahawks** | **L** 14–21 | 0–1 | Mile High Stadium | 75,986 |
| 2 | September 11 | **San Diego Chargers** | **W** 34–3 | 1–1 | Mile High Stadium | 75,359 |
| 3 | September 18 | at **Kansas City Chiefs** | **L** 13–20 | 1–2 | Arrowhead Stadium | 63,268 |
| 4 | September 26 | **Los Angeles Raiders** | **L** 27–30 (OT) | 1–3 | Mile High Stadium | 75,964 |
| 5 | October 2 | at **San Diego Chargers** | **W** 12–0 | 2–3 | Jack Murphy Stadium | 55,763 |
| 6 | October 9 | at San Francisco 49ers | W 16–13 (OT) | 3–3 | Candlestick Park | 61,711 |
| 7 | October 16 | Atlanta Falcons | **W** 30–14 | 4–3 | Mile High Stadium | 75,287 |
| 8 | October 23 | at Pittsburgh Steelers | **L** 21–39 | 4–4 | Three Rivers Stadium | 49,811 |
| 9 | October 31 | at Indianapolis Colts | **L** 23–55 | 4–5 | Hoosier Dome | 60,544 |
| 10 | November 6 | **Kansas City Chiefs** | **W** 17–11 | 5–5 | Mile High Stadium | 74,227 |
| 11 | November 13 | Cleveland Browns | **W** 30–7 | 6–5 | Mile High Stadium | 75,806 |
| 12 | November 20 | at New Orleans Saints | **L** 0–42 | 6–6 | Louisiana Superdome | 68,075 |
| 13 | November 27 | Los Angeles Rams | **W** 35–24 | 7–6 | Mile High Stadium | 74,141 |
| 14 | December 4 | at **Los Angeles Raiders** | **L** 20–21 | 7–7 | Los Angeles Memorial Coliseum | 65,561 |
| 15 | December 11 | at **Seattle Seahawks** | **L** 14–42 | 7–8 | Kingdome | 62,838 |
| 16 | December 17 | New England Patriots | **W** 21–10 | 8–8 | Mile High Stadium | 70,910 |
Note: Intra-division opponents are in **bold** text.

== Game summaries ==
=== Week 9 at Colts ===
Week Nine: Denver Broncos (4–4) at Indianapolis Colts (3–5)

| Quarter | 1 | 2 | 3 | 4 | Total |
|---|---|---|---|---|---|
| Broncos | 0 | 10 | 0 | 13 | 23 |
| Colts | 21 | 24 | 3 | 7 | 55 |

at Hoosier Dome, Indianapolis, Indiana

- Date: October 31
- Game time: 8:00 p.m. CDT
- Game weather: Indoors (dome)
- Game attendance: 60,544
- TV announcers (ABC): Al Michaels
- Box Score, Box Score

Game information

First quarter

- IND – Eric Dickerson 12-yard run (Dean Biasucci kick), 9:41. Colts 7–0.
- IND – Eric Dickerson 11-yard run (Dean Biasucci kick), 5:39. Colts 14–0.
- IND – Eric Dickerson 1-yard run (Dean Biasucci kick), 0:16. Colts 21–0.

Second quarter

- IND – Dean Biasucci 31-yard field goal, 13:22. Colts 24–0.
- IND – Eric Dickerson 41-yard run (Dean Biasucci kick), 11:47. Colts 31–0.
- DEN – Steve Sewell 2-yard pass from John Elway (Rich Karlis kick, 9:54. Colts 31–7.
- IND – Bill Brooks 53-yard pass from Gary Hogeboom (Dean Biasucci kick), 7:08. Colts 38–7.
- DEN – Rich Karlis 27-yard field goal, 1:00. Colts 38–10.
- IND – Clarence Verdin 40-yard pass from Chris Chandler (Dean Biasucci kick), 0:22. Colts 45–10.

Third quarter

- IND – Dean Biasucci 27-yard field goal, 6:34. Colts 48–10.

Fourth quarter

- IND – Albert Bentley 4-yard run (Dean Biasucci kick), 11:49. Colts 55–10.
- DEN – Vance Johnson 7-yard pass from Gary Kubiak (kick failed), 6:07. Colts 55–17.
- DEN – Steve Sewell 48-yard pass from Gary Kubiak (Rich Karlis kick), 5:39. Colts 55–23.

Top passers

- DEN – John Elway – 15/27, 158 yards, TD
- IND – Chris Chandler – 10/13, 167 yards, TD

Top rushers

- DEN – Ricky Nattiel – 1 rush, 29 yards
- IND – Eric Dickerson – 21 rushes, 159 yards, 4 TD

Top receivers

- DEN – Steve Sewell – 6 receptions, 82 yards, 2 TD
- IND – Bill Brooks – 3 receptions, 108 yards, TD

=== Week 16 ===
| Team | 1 | 2 | 3 | 4 | Total |
|---|---|---|---|---|---|
| Patriots | 7 | 3 | 0 | 0 | 10 |
| • Broncos | 7 | 7 | 0 | 7 | 21 |

- Date: December 17
- Location: Mile High Stadium, Denver, Colorado
- Game start: 4:00 p.m.
- Game weather: 32 °F (0 °C); wind 9 mph (14 km/h)

Scoring summary
| Q1 | NE | Stephens 23 yard run (Staurovsky kick) | NE 7–0 |
| Q1 | DEN | Winder 1 yard run (Karlis kick) | Tie 7–7 |
| Q2 | DEN | Dorsett 5 yard run (Karlis kick) | DEN 14–7 |
| Q2 | NE | Staurovsky 32 yard field goal | DEN 14–10 |
| Q4 | DEN | Winder 4 yard run (Karlis kick) | DEN 21–10 |

== Standings ==
AFC West
| | W | L | T | PCT | DIV | CONF | PF | PA | STK |
|---|---|---|---|---|---|---|---|---|---|
| ^{(3)} Seattle Seahawks | 9 | 7 | 0 | .563 | 6–2 | 8–4 | 339 | 329 | W2 |
| Denver Broncos | 8 | 8 | 0 | .500 | 3–5 | 5–7 | 327 | 352 | W1 |
| Los Angeles Raiders | 7 | 9 | 0 | .438 | 6–2 | 6–6 | 325 | 369 | L2 |
| San Diego Chargers | 6 | 10 | 0 | .375 | 3–5 | 4–8 | 231 | 332 | W2 |
| Kansas City Chiefs | 4 | 11 | 1 | .281 | 2–6 | 4–9–1 | 254 | 320 | L2 |
