= 1986 Denver Broncos season =

American football team season

- Owner: Pat Bowlen
- General manager: John Beake
- Head coach: Dan Reeves
- Offensive coordinator: Mike Shanahan
- Defensive coordinator: Joe Collier
- Home stadium: Mile High Stadium

Results
- Record: 11–5
- Division place: 1st AFC West
- Playoffs: Won Divisional Playoffs (vs. Patriots) 22–17; Won AFC Championship (at Browns) 23–20 (OT); Lost Super Bowl XXI (vs. Giants) 20–39
- Pro Bowlers: QB John Elway; RB Sammy Winder; G Keith Bishop; DE Rulon Jones; LB Karl Mecklenburg; S Dennis Smith

The 1986 Denver Broncos season was the franchise's 27th year in professional football and its 17th with the National Football League (NFL). They finished the regular season with a record of 11–5, returned to the playoffs after a one-year absence. In the Divisional Playoffs the Broncos defeated the New England Patriots 22–17. Then won the AFC Championship over the Cleveland Browns 23–20. At Super Bowl XXI the New York Giants dominated the second half of the game and won 39–20. This would be the first of back to back Super Bowl losses for the team.

This season would be the final season for the remaining members of the Orange Crush Defense that had carried the Broncos to their first Super Bowl nine seasons earlier, as nose tackle Rubin Carter, linebacker Tom Jackson, cornerback Louis Wright and safety Steve Foley would all retire after the season.

== Offseason ==
=== NFL draft ===
1986 Denver Broncos draft
Round	Pick	Player	Position	College	Notes
4	104	Jim Juriga	Guard	Illinois	
5	134	Tony Colorito	Nose tackle	USC	
6	151	Orson Mobley	Tight end	Salem	
6	161	Mark Jackson	Wide receiver	Purdue	
7	188	Raymond Phillips	Linebacker	North Carolina State	
8	217	Bruce Klosterman	Linebacker	South Dakota State	
9	244	Joe Thomas	Wide receiver	Mississippi Valley State	
10	271	Victor Hall	Tight end	Jackson State	
11	301	Thomas Dendy	Running back	South Carolina	
Made roster † Pro Football Hall of Fame * Made at least one Pro Bowl during career

== Personnel ==
=== Staff ===
1986 Denver Broncos staff
Front office: President and Chief Executive Officer – Pat Bowlen; General manager – John Beake; Director of player personnel – Reed Johnson; Head coaches: Vice president/head Coach – Dan Reeves; Assistant head coach/defense – Joe Collier; Special Assistant – Marvin Bass; Offensive coaches: Offensive coordinator/Quarterbacks – Mike Shanahan; Running Backs – Nick Nicolau; Wide Receivers – Kay Dalton; Offensive Line – Alex Gibbs	Defensive coaches: Defensive Line – Stan Jones; Linebackers – Myrel Moore; Defensive Backs – Charlie West; Special teams coaches: Special Teams/Tight Ends – Chan Gailey; Strength and conditioning: Strength/Conditioning – Al Miller

=== Roster ===
1986 Denver Broncos roster
Quarterbacks (QB): 7 John Elway; 8 Gary Kubiak; Running backs (RB): 35 Ken Bell; 33 Gene Lang; 30 Steve Sewell; 47 Gerald Willhite; 23 Sammy Winder; Wide receivers (WR): 80 Mark Jackson; 82 Vance Johnson; 84 Clint Sampson; 81 Steve Watson; Tight ends (TE): 85 Joey Hackett; 87 Bobby Micho; 89 Orson Mobley	Offensive linemen (OL): 54 Keith Bishop G; 64 Billy Bryan C; 63 Mark Cooper G; 62 Mike Freeman G/C; 60 Paul Howard G; 76 Ken Lanier T; 74 Dan Remsberg T; 70 Dave Studdard T; Defensive linemen (DL): 69 Tony Colorito NT; 73 Simon Fletcher DE; 90 Freddie Gilbert DE; 75 Rulon Jones DE; 71 Greg Kragen NT; 61 Andre Townsend DE	Linebackers (LB): 59 Darren Comeaux ILB; 55 Rick Dennison ILB; 98 Ricky Hunley ILB; 57 Tom Jackson OLB; 77 Karl Mecklenburg ILB; 50 Jim Ryan OLB; 52 Ken Woodard OLB; Defensive backs (DB): 43 Steve Foley FS; 31 Mike Harden CB; 36 Mark Haynes CB; 22 Tony Lilly FS; 48 Randy Robbins SS; 49 Dennis Smith SS; 45 Steve Wilson CB; 20 Louis Wright CB; Special teams (ST): 2 Mike Horan P; 3 Rich Karlis K	Practice squad: None - Vacant; Reserve: 72 Dallas Cameron LB (IR); 68 Rubin Carter NT (IR); 32 Joe Dudek RB (IR); 66 Jim Juriga T (IR); 88 Clarence Kay TE (NF-Ill.); 97 Bruce Klosterman ILB (IR); 83 Gary Rolle WR (IR); -- Stanley Short G/T (IR); 99 Ray Woodard DE (IR); Rookies in italics 48 active, 9 reserve, 0 practice squad

== Regular season ==
The Broncos won their first six games of the season, before being defeated by the then-5-1 New York Jets on Monday Night Football. They won two more games to improve to 8–1, tied with the Jets for the best record in the league. Although they would go 3–4 down the stretch, alternating wins and losses, Denver still finished ahead of the Seahawks and Chiefs in first place in the AFC West.

Week	Date	Opponent	Result	Record	Venue	Attendance
1	September 7	**Los Angeles Raiders**	**W** 38–36	1–0	Mile High Stadium	75,695
2	September 15	at Pittsburgh Steelers	**W** 21–10	2–0	Three Rivers Stadium	57,305
3	September 21	at Philadelphia Eagles	**W** 33–7	3–0	Veterans Stadium	63,839
4	September 28	New England Patriots	**W** 27–20	4–0	Mile High Stadium	75,804
5	October 5	Dallas Cowboys	**W** 29–14	5–0	Mile High Stadium	76,082
6	October 12	at **San Diego Chargers**	**W** 31–14	6–0	Jack Murphy Stadium	55,662
7	October 20	at New York Jets	**L** 10–22	6–1	Giants Stadium	73,759
8	October 26	**Seattle Seahawks**	**W** 20–13	7–1	Mile High Stadium	76,089
9	November 2	at **Los Angeles Raiders**	**W** 21–10	8–1	Los Angeles Memorial Coliseum	90,153
10	November 9	**San Diego Chargers**	**L** 3–9	8–2	Mile High Stadium	75,012
11	November 16	**Kansas City Chiefs**	**W** 38–17	9–2	Mile High Stadium	75,745
12	November 23	at New York Giants	**L** 16–19	9–3	Giants Stadium	75,116
13	November 30	Cincinnati Bengals	**W** 34–28	10–3	Mile High Stadium	58,705
14	December 7	at **Kansas City Chiefs**	**L** 10–37	10–4	Arrowhead Stadium	47,019
15	December 13	Washington Redskins	**W** 31–30	11–4	Mile High Stadium	75,905
16	December 20	at **Seattle Seahawks**	**L** 16–41	11–5	Kingdome	63,697
Note: Intra-division opponents are in **bold** text.

=== Game summaries ===
==== Week 1 ====
Team	1	2	3	4	Total
Raiders	16	6	14	0	36
• **Broncos**	7	14	7	10	38

- Date: September 7
- Location: Mile High Stadium, Denver, Colorado
- Game start: 2:00 p.m. MDT
- Game weather: 49 °F (9 °C) • Wind 9 mph (14 km/h)
- Referee: Jim Tunney
- TV announcers (NBC): Don Criqui (play-by-play), Bob Trumpy (color commentator)

Scoring summary
1	DEN	Steve Watson 35-yard pass from John Elway (Rich Karlis kick)	Broncos 7–0
1	LA	Marcus Allen 24-yard pass from Marc Wilson (Chris Bahr kick)	Tie 7–7
1	LA	Todd Christensen 16-yard pass from Marc Wilson (Chris Bahr kick)	Raiders 14–7
1	DEN	Safety, John Elway tackled by Greg Townsend in end zone	Raiders 16–7
2	LA	Chris Bahr 43-yard field goal	Raiders 19–7
2	DEN	John Elway 23-yard pass from Steve Sewell (Rich Karlis kick)	Raiders 19–14
2	LA	Chris Bahr 42-yard field goal	Raiders 22–14
2	DEN	Gene Lang 1-yard run (Rich Karlis kick)	Raiders 22–21
3	LA	Marcus Allen 2-yard run (Chris Bahr kick)	Raiders 29–21
3	DEN	Ken Woodard 16-yard fumble return (Rich Karlis kick)	Raiders 29–28
3	LA	Rod Barksdale 57-yard pass from Marc Wilson (Chris Bahr kick)	Raiders 36–28
4	DEN	Rich Karlis 51-yard field goal	Raiders 36–31
4	DEN	Gene Lang 7-yard pass from John Elway (Rich Karlis kick)	Broncos 38–36

==== Week 2 ====
Team	1	2	3	4	Total
• Broncos	0	7	7	7	21
Steelers	0	0	3	7	10

- Date: September 15
- Location: Three Rivers Stadium, Pittsburgh
- Game start: 9:00 p.m. EST
- Game attendance: 57,305
- Game weather: 64 °F (18 °C); wind 7 mph (11 km/h)
- Referee: Bob McElwee
- TV announcers (ABC): Frank Gifford and Al Michaels

Scoring summary
Q2	DEN	Watson 21 yard pass from Elway (Karlis kick)	DEN 7–0
Q3	PIT	Anderson 42 yard field goal	DEN 7–3
Q3	DEN	Sewell 34 yard pass from Elway (Karlis kick)	DEN 14–3
Q4	PIT	Erenberg 7 yard run (Anderson kick)	DEN 14–10
Q4	DEN	Winder 13 yard pass from Elway (Karlis kick)	DEN 21–10

==== Week 12 ====
Week 12: Denver Broncos at New York Giants

Quarter	1	2	3	4	Total
Broncos (9–3)	3	3	3	7	**16**
**Giants (10–2)**	0	10	3	6	**19**

at Giants Stadium

- Date: November 23, 1986
- Game time: 11:00 a.m. MST
- Game weather: 43 °F (6 °C), relative humidity 70%, wind 10 mph (16 km/h)
- Game attendance: 75,116
- Referee: Tom Dooley
- TV announcers (NBC): Dick Enberg (play-by-play), Merlin Olsen (color commentator)
- Box Score

Scoring summary

Quarter	Time	Drive			Team	Scoring information	Score	
Quarter	Time	Plays	Yards	TOP	Team	Scoring information	Broncos	Giants
1	6:46				Broncos	40-yard field goal by Karlis	3	0
2	14:57				Giants	31-yard field goal by Allegre	3	3
2	2:38				Broncos	32-yard field goal by Karlis	6	3
2	0:43				Giants	Interception returned 75 yards for touchdown by Martin, Allegre kick good	6	10
3	9:46				Giants	45-yard field goal by Allegre	6	13
3	1:53				Broncos	42-yard field goal by Karlis	9	13
4	10:07				Giants	46-yard field goal by Allegre	9	16
4	1:55				Broncos	Winder 4-yard touchdown run, Karlis kick good	16	16
4	0:06				Giants	34-yard field goal by Allegre	16	19
"TOP" = time of possession. For other American football terms, see Glossary of American football.							16	19

=== Standings ===
AFC West
	W	L	T	PCT	DIV	CONF	PF	PA	STK
^{(2)} Denver Broncos	11	5	0	.688	5–3	8–4	378	327	L1
^{(5)} Kansas City Chiefs	10	6	0	.625	5–3	9–5	358	326	W3
Seattle Seahawks	10	6	0	.625	5–3	7–5	366	293	W5
Los Angeles Raiders	8	8	0	.500	4–4	7–5	323	346	L4
San Diego Chargers	4	12	0	.250	1–7	4–8	335	396	L2

== Playoffs ==
Round	Date	Opponent (seed)	Result	Record	Venue	Attendance
Divisional	January 4, 1987	New England Patriots (3)	W 22–17	1–0	Mile High Stadium	76,105
AFC Championship	January 11, 1987	at Cleveland Browns (1)	W 23–20 (OT)	2–0	Cleveland Stadium	79,915
Super Bowl XXI	January 25, 1987	New York Giants (N1)	L 20–39	2–1	Rose Bowl	101,063

They won their divisional playoff game against the Patriots at home 22–17. They then played the Cleveland Browns in Cleveland for the AFC Championship. The game culminated in the famous "Drive", where John Elway led a 98-yard drive for a touchdown pass to Mark Jackson to tie the game and send it to overtime, where they won by a field goal, 23–20.

=== AFC Divisional Playoff ===
==== AFC: Denver Broncos 22, New England Patriots 17 ====
Game summary

Quarter	1	2	3	4	Total
Patriots	0	10	7	0	17
Broncos	3	7	10	2	22

at Mile High Stadium, Denver

- Game time: 4:00 p.m. EST/2:00 p.m. MST
- Game attendance: 75,262
- Referee: Jerry Seeman
- TV announcers (NBC): Dick Enberg and Merlin Olsen

Game information
- Scoring
  - DEN – FG R. Karlis 27 DEN 3–0
  - NE – S. Morgan 19 pass from Eason (Franklin kick) NE 7–3
  - DEN – J. Elway 22 run (Karlis kick) DEN 10–7
  - NE – FG A. Franklin 38 10–10
  - DEN – field goal Karlis 22 DEN 13–10
  - NE – S. Morgan 45 pass from Eason (Franklin kick) NE 17–13
  - DEN – V. Johnson 48 pass from Elway (Karlis kick) DEN 20–17
  - DEN – Safety, Eason sacked by R. Jones in end zone DEN 22–17

Broncos go to the AFC Championship Game and win to the Cleveland Browns in The Drive 23-20. But lost in Super Bowl XXI to the Giants 39-20.

=== AFC Championship game ===
Quarter	1	2	3	4	OT	Total
Broncos	0	10	3	7	3	23
Browns	7	3	0	10	0	20

at Cleveland Stadium, Cleveland

- Game time: 12:30 p.m. EST
- Game attendance: 79,973
- Referee: Chuck Heberling
- TV announcers (NBC): Dick Enberg and Merlin Olsen

This game is best remembered for The Drive when the Broncos drove 98 yards to tie the game with 37 seconds left in regulation, and Denver kicker Rich Karlis made the game-winning 33-yard field goal 5:38 into overtime.

The Browns scored first when quarterback Bernie Kosar threw a 6-yard touchdown pass to running back Herman Fontenot at the end of an 86-yard drive. But the Broncos then scored 10 unanswered points: Karlis' 19-yard field goal and running back Gerald Willhite's 1-yard rushing touchdown. Cleveland kicker Mark Moseley's 29-yard field goal before halftime tied the score, 10–10. The teams exchanged punts before Kosar completed a 48-yard touchdown pass to Brian Brennan with 5:43 remaining in regulation. Elway then led his team from their own 2-yard line to tie the game on wide receiver Mark Jackson's 5-yard touchdown reception with 37 seconds left in regulation. Karlis' game-winning field goal in overtime capped a 60-yard drive after the Browns were forced to punt.

==== The Drive play-by-play ====
The Browns had jumped to a 20–13 lead and the Broncos had muffed the ensuing kickoff when Elway took over, first-and-10 on their own 2-yard line, with 5:32 to play in the game.

1. – First down and 10, Denver 2-yard line. Sammy Winder 5-yard pass from Elway.

2. – Second down and 5, Denver 7-yard line. Winder 3-yard run.

3. – Third down and 2, Denver 10-yard line. Winder 2-yard run.

4. – First down and 10, Denver 12-yard line. Winder 3-yard run.

5. – Second down and 7, Denver 15-yard line. Elway 11-yard run.

6. – First down and 10, Denver 26-yard line. Steve Sewell 22-yard pass from Elway.

7. – First down and 10, Denver 48-yard line. S. Watson 12-yard pass from Elway.

Two-minute warning

8. – First down and 10, Cleveland 40-yard line (1:59 remaining). Incomplete pass by Elway, intended for Vance Johnson.

9. – Second down and 10, Cleveland 40-yard line (1:52 remaining). Dave Puzzilli sack of Elway, 8-yard loss.

10. – Third down and 18, Cleveland 48-yard line (1:47 remaining). Mark Jackson 20-yard pass from Elway.

11. – First down and 10, Cleveland 28-yard line (1:19 remaining). Incomplete pass by Elway, intended for Watson.

12. – Second down and 10, Cleveland 28-yard line (1:10 remaining). Steve Sewell 14-yard pass from Elway.

13. – First down and 10, Cleveland 14-yard line (:57 remaining). Incomplete pass by Elway, intended for Watson.

14. – Second down and 10, Cleveland 14-yard line (:42 remaining). John Elway 9-yard run (scramble).

15. – Third down and 1, Cleveland 5-yard line (:39 remaining). Mark Jackson 5-yard pass from Elway for the touchdown. Rich Karlis then adds the extra point to tie the game. Broncos go to Super Bowl XXI but lost to the Giants 39-20.

=== Super Bowl XXI ===
They played the Giants in Super Bowl XXI, losing 20–39, the first of Elway's five Super Bowls and the first of his three losses. Despite leading 10–9 at halftime, the Broncos collapsed in the second half as the Giants scored 30 points to Denver's ten.

== Super Bowl XXI: New York Giants 39, Denver Broncos 20 ==
Super Bowl XXI: Denver Broncos vs. New York Giants

Quarter	1	2	3	4	Total
Broncos (13–6)	10	0	0	10	20
Giants (17–2)	7	2	17	13	39

at Rose Bowl, Pasadena, California

- Date: January 25, 1987
- Game time: 3:13 p.m. PST
- Game weather: 76 °F (24 °C), sunny, relative humidity 68%, wind 5 mph (8.0 km/h)
- Game attendance: 101,063
- Referee: Jerry Markbreit
- TV announcers (CBS): Pat Summerall (play-by-play), John Madden (color commentator), Will McDonough (sideline reporter)
- Box Score

Scoring summary

Quarter	Time	Drive			Team	Scoring information	Score	
Quarter	Time	Plays	Yards	TOP	Team	Scoring information	Broncos	Giants
1	10:51	8	45	4:09	Broncos	48-yard field goal by Karlis	3	0
1	5:27	9	78	5:24	Giants	Mowatt 6-yard touchdown reception from Simms, Allegre kick good	3	7
1	2:06	6	58	3:21	Broncos	Elway 4-yard touchdown run, Karlis kick good	10	7
2	2:46	3	-15	0:45	Giants	Elway tackled in end zone for a safety by Martin	10	9
3	10:08	8	63	4:52	Giants	Bavaro 13-yard touchdown reception from Simms, Allegre kick good	10	16
3	3:54	9	32	5:07	Giants	21-yard field goal by Allegre	10	19
3	0:24	5	68	2:14	Giants	Morris 1-yard touchdown run, Allegre kick good	10	26
4	10:56	6	52	3:50	Giants	McConkey 6-yard touchdown reception from Simms, Allegre kick good	10	33
4	6:01	13	73	4:55	Broncos	28-yard field goal by Karlis	13	33
4	3:18	5	46	1:43	Giants	Anderson 2-yard touchdown run, Allegre kick no good	13	39
4	2:06	5	69	1:12	Broncos	Johnson 47-yard touchdown reception from Elway, Karlis kick good	20	39
"TOP" = time of possession. For other American football terms, see Glossary of American football.							20	39

Broncos lost and in 1987 finished 10-4-1 but lost in Super Bowl XXII to the Redskins 42-10.

== Statistics ==
=== Team stats ===
Denver scored 378 points during the year, sixth in the NFL. They gave up 327 points, 15th in the league.

The Broncos were 17th in the league in total offense, with 5,489 yards. They had 3,811 passing yards and 1,678 rushing yards. They had 22 passing touchdowns and 17 rushing touchdowns.

They were 17th in the league with 3,755 passing yards given up and 15th with 1,891 rushing yards given up. They were 21st in overall defense with 5,646 yards given up.

The team's 11–5 record is their sixth-best 16-game season in franchise history.

=== Player stats ===
- John Elway had 280 completions for 3,485 yards, 19 touchdowns and 13 interceptions. He also had 52 rushes for 257 yards, third highest on the team, and one rushing touchdown. He was fifth in the league in completions, ninth in total yards, and tenth in touchdowns.
- Mark Jackson had 38 receptions for 738 yards and one touchdown. Steve Watson had 45 receptions for 699 yards and three touchdowns. Vance Johnson had 31 receptions for 363 yards and two touchdowns. Clint Sampson had 21 receptions for 259 yards. Orson Mobley had 22 reception for 332 yards and one touchdown.
- The primary running back Sammy Winder had 240 rushes for 789 yards and 9 touchdowns, seventh highest in the league. He also had five touchdown receptions, giving him 14 total touchdowns for the season, fourth in the league. Gerald Willhite had 85 rushes for 365 yards and five rushing touchdowns and 64 receptions for 529 yards and 3 receiving touchdowns.
- Rich Karlis kicked 20 field goals out of 28 attempted, including the game-winning field goal in the AFC Championship Game. He kicked 44 out of 45 extra points.

== Awards and honors ==
- Keith Bishop, AFC Pro Bowl selection
- John Elway, AFC Pro Bowl selection
- Rulon Jones, AFC Pro Bowl selection
- Karl Mecklenburg, AFC Pro Bowl selection
- Dennis Smith, AFC Pro Bowl selection
- Sammy Winder, AFC Pro Bowl selection
