= Vance Johnson =

American football player (born 1963)

No. 82
- Position: Wide receiver

Personal information
- Born: March 13, 1963 (age 63); Trenton, New Jersey, U.S.
- Listed height: 5 ft 11 in (1.80 m)
- Listed weight: 185 lb (84 kg)

Career information
- High school: Cholla (Tucson, Arizona)
- College: Arizona
- NFL draft: 1985: 2nd round, 31st overall pick

Career history
- Denver Broncos (1985–1992); Minnesota Vikings (1993)*; Denver Broncos (1993); San Diego Chargers (1994)*; Denver Broncos (1995)
- * Offseason or practice squad member only

Awards and highlights
- First-team All-Pac-10 (1982)

Career NFL statistics
- Receptions: 415
- Receiving yards: 5,695
- Receiving touchdowns: 37
- Stats at Pro Football Reference

Vance Edward Johnson (born March 13, 1963) is an American former professional football player who was a wide receiver for the Denver Broncos of the National Football League (NFL). He played college football for the Arizona Wildcats. Johnson was selected by the Broncos in the second round of the 1985 NFL draft.

== Playing career ==
A 5'11", 174 lb. wide receiver, Johnson played college football at the University of Arizona, where he functioned as a multipurpose running back. In four seasons as a starter for the Wildcats, Johnson amassed 2,885 yards from scrimmage, 104 receptions, and 31 touchdowns, while also returning 62 kickoffs for 1,369 yards and another score. Johnson was also a World-Class long jumper. In 1982, Johnson won the NCAA championship, as well as winning the gold medal at the Junior Pan American games. In 1984 Johnson just missed making the U.S. Olympic team, finishing fourth in the long jump at the 1984 U.S. Olympic Trials.

Johnson spent his entire NFL career for the Broncos from 1985 to 1995. He helped the Broncos to three Super Bowl appearances in the 1980s and had an impressive performance in Super Bowl XXI, recording five catches for 121 yards and a touchdown. His best season was in 1989, when he recorded 76 receptions for 1,095 yards and seven touchdowns. In his 11 seasons, Johnson recorded 415 receptions for 5,695 yards and 37 touchdowns, while also rushing 17 times for 44 yards. He also gained 689 yards on punt returns, and 1,027 yards returning kickoffs. Johnson and fellow Broncos wide receivers Ricky Nattiel and Mark Jackson all played together from 1987 to 1992 and were nicknamed "The Three Amigos."

As of the 2017 NFL off-season, Johnson held at least three Broncos franchise records, including:

- Punt returns: playoffs (13), playoff season (7 in 1989; with Darrien Gordon)
- 100+ yard receiving games: playoffs (3; with Demaryius Thomas)

== Post-NFL life ==
During a 1996 episode of The Oprah Winfrey Show, Johnson admitted to abusing his ex-wife and other women in his life. Johnson has been married 9 times. He has seven biological children, plus two he adopted through his recent marriage to his last wife Michelle.

Johnson owned a real estate company in Grand Junction, Colorado, and VJ's Outlaw Ribs in Parachute, Colorado, where he lived with his son, Scott. He was the owner of Epicurious in Grand Junction, but in November 2012 he abruptly closed it, leaving a note on the front door of the building, but offering no further explanation. Another son, Vaughn Edward, died from a motorcycle accident in 2007.

Johnson achieved sobriety in 2013. He is currently an advocate for addiction recovery for athletes post-career. He is also a rehabilitation ambassador with Americas Rehab Campus in Tucson, Arizona; using his experiences to help others.

== Legacy ==
In March 2019, Johnson's biography, Uncovered: Why Becoming Less Became Everything was released. For years he hid a serious alcohol and pill addiction that cost him everything he had. He recalled hitting rock bottom in the middle of a canyon in Colorado. Johnson was interviewed for the March 27, 2019, edition of ABC Action News. He has been featured on the Oprah Winfrey Show, Maury Povich Show, the NFL Network, and the Wendy Williams Show.

Johnson was interviewed by William Slover of Pain Resource, about his struggles with addiction and chronic pain.

== NFL career statistics ==
Legend
	Led the league
**Bold**	Career high

=== Regular season ===
Year	Team	Games		Receiving				
Year	Team	GP	GS	Rec	Yds	Avg	Lng	TD
1985	DEN	**16**	7	51	721	14.1	63	3
1986	DEN	12	9	31	363	11.7	34	2
1987	DEN	11	9	42	684	16.3	59	**7**
1988	DEN	**16**	13	68	896	13.2	**86**	5
1989	DEN	**16**	**16**	**76**	**1,095**	14.4	69	**7**
1990	DEN	**16**	13	54	747	13.8	49	3
1991	DEN	10	0	21	208	9.9	22	3
1992	DEN	11	7	24	294	12.3	40	2
1993	DEN	10	8	36	517	14.4	56	5
1995	DEN	10	1	12	170	14.2	23	0
Career		128	83	415	5,695	13.7	86	37
