= Ron McLean (American football) =

American football player (born 1963)

No. 96, 62
- Position: Defensive lineman

Personal information
- Born: April 13, 1963 (age 63); Everett, Washington, U.S.
- Listed height: 6 ft 3 in (1.91 m)
- Listed weight: 270 lb (122 kg)

Career information
- High school: Ernest Righetti (Santa Maria, California)
- College: Cal State Fullerton
- NFL draft: 1987: 9th round, 241st overall pick

Career history
- New York Jets (1987)*; Denver Broncos (1987); New York Giants (1988)*; Kansas City Chiefs (1988)
- * Offseason or practice squad member only

Career NFL statistics
- Games played: 9
- Stats at Pro Football Reference

Ron McLean (born April 13, 1963) is an American former professional football player. He spent two seasons as a defensive lineman in the National Football League (NFL), playing for the Denver Broncos in 1987 and then the Kansas City Chiefs in 1988.

== Early life ==
McLean graduated in 1982 from Righetti High School in Santa Maria, California. As a senior for the Warriors, he was selected for All-Northern League First Team and All-CIF Division 2 Second Team honors. He then played at Cal State Fullerton.

== Professional career ==
McLean was selected in the ninth round of the 1987 NFL draft, with the 241st overall pick, by the New York Jets.

He played in three regular-season games as a rookie nose tackle with the Denver Broncos, being a replacement player, before being converted to defensive end and playing six regular-season games in his second season with the Kansas City Chiefs.
