= Neal Sweeney =

Football player (born 1945)

No. 49
- Position: Wide receiver

Personal information
- Born: June 13, 1945; Los Angeles, California, U.S.
- Died: September 4, 2008 (aged 63); Tulsa, Oklahoma, U.S.
- Listed height: 6 ft 2 in (1.88 m)
- Listed weight: 170 lb (77 kg)

Career information
- High school: Birmingham (CA)
- College: Tulsa
- NFL draft: 1967: 6th round, 139th overall pick

Career history
- Denver Broncos (1967)
- Stats at Pro Football Reference

Neal Sweeney (June 13, 1945 – September 4, 2008) was an American football wide receiver. He played for the Denver Broncos in 1967.

He was shot and killed on September 4, 2008, in Tulsa, Oklahoma at age 63.
