= Joe Thomas (wide receiver) =

American football player (born 1963)

No. 89
- Position: Wide receiver

Personal information
- Born: March 25, 1963 (age 63); Lafayette, Louisiana, U.S.
- Listed height: 5 ft 11 in (1.80 m)
- Listed weight: 175 lb (79 kg)

Career information
- College: Mississippi Valley State
- NFL draft: 1986: 9th round, 244th overall pick

Career history
- Denver Broncos (1986)*; Hamilton Tiger-Cats (1987); New Orleans Saints (1987)
- * Offseason or practice squad member only
- Stats at Pro Football Reference

Joseph Earl Thomas (born March 25, 1963) is an American former professional football player who was a wide receiver for the New Orleans Saints of the National Football League (NFL). He college football played for Mississippi Valley State Delta Devils. Thomas was selected in the ninth round with the 244th overall pick by the Denver Broncos in the 1986 NFL draft and was traded to the Saints. He played alongside Jerry Rice and the two share records in the NCAA record book. He is tenth all time in the record books for receiving touchdowns in 1985 and is thirteenth all time for career touchdowns.
