= Ken Bell (American football) =

American football player (born 1964)

No. 35, 41
- Positions: Running back, return specialist

Personal information
- Born: November 16, 1964 (age 61); Greenwich, Connecticut, U.S.
- Listed height: 5 ft 10 in (1.78 m)
- Listed weight: 190 lb (86 kg)

Career information
- High school: Greenwich
- College: Boston College
- NFL draft: 1986: undrafted

Career history
- Denver Broncos (1986–1989); Rhein Fire (1991)

Career NFL statistics
- Rushing yards: 96
- Rushing average: 3.1
- Return yards: 2,365
- Stats at Pro Football Reference

Kenneth Shawn Bell (born November 16, 1964) is an American former professional football player who was a return specialist for the Denver Broncos of the National Football League (NFL) in the late 1980s. He played college football for the Boston College Eagles.

== Early life ==
Bell attended the local high school in Greenwich, Connecticut, where he was part of a dominating football program and teammates with future Hall of Fame quarterback Steve Young. He was inducted into the high school's hall of fame in 2015.

== College career ==
Bell attended Boston College, appearing in all but one of the team's 48 games in four years from 1982 to 1985. His first three seasons, he was teammates with Heisman Trophy winner Doug Flutie. He had just 39 yards rushing and 112 returning kickoffs his freshman year, but his sophomore season saw increasing touches as a receiving running back (312 yards from scrimmage) and a returner (333). The season was highlighted by a 51-yard kickoff return to set up a late game-winning field goal in an 18-15 win over Temple. His junior year, Bell had 348 rushing yards, 200 receiving yards, and 410 kick return yards. He scored a 71-yard touchdown run on Nov 3 during a nationally televised game against Penn State. His senior year, 1985, he rarely returned kicks, but led the Eagles with 583 rushing yards for four touchdowns, along with 27 receptions for 237 yards.

== Professional career ==
Bell was undrafted out of college, but signed with the Denver Broncos for the 1986 season. Almost exclusively a kick returner (he had just 3 receptions and less than 100 yards rushing in four seasons with the team), Bell initially saw split duty with Gene Lang. However, after he finished his rookie year 6th in the league with 23.1 yards per return, he became the starter for all but three games where he was injured in 1987. Bell was so popular with the coaching staff, that even though his replacement Shane Swanson still holds the franchise rookie record for most all-purpose yards in a game, he was released from the team when Bell returned. In the 1987–88 NFL playoffs, Bell muffed a kick-off return late in the 4th quarter of the AFC Championship Game, recovering it at the 2-yard line. This set up "The Drive", arguably the defining moment of Hall of Famer John Elway's career. Bell returned most of the Broncos kicks in both 1988 (career highs of 36 returns for 768 yards) and 1989 (30 returns for 602 yards).

As of 2017's NFL off-season, Bell still holds the Broncos franchise record for most playoff kick returns at 21.
