= Shane Swanson =

American football player (born 1962)

No. 17, 80
- Position: Wide receiver

Personal information
- Born: October 4, 1962 (age 64); Tracy, California, U.S.
- Listed height: 5 ft 9 in (1.75 m)
- Listed weight: 200 lb (91 kg)

Career information
- High school: Hershey (NE)
- College: Nebraska
- NFL draft: 1985: 12th round, 315th overall pick

Career history
- Cleveland Browns (1985)*; Denver Broncos (1987)
- * Offseason or practice squad member only

Career NFL statistics
- Receptions: 6
- Receiving yards: 87
- Touchdowns: 1
- Stats at Pro Football Reference

Shane Dru Swanson (born October 4, 1962) is an American former professional football player who played briefly for the Denver Broncos in 1987. He played three seasons of college football at Nebraska as a return specialist, running back, and wide receiver. Though used sparingly at all three positions, he is remembered for a go-ahead 49 yard punt return touchdown in the fourth quarter to help #8 Nebraska defeat #9 Oklahoma State on Oct 6, 1984. Swanson was selected 315th overall by the Cleveland Browns in the 12th round of the 1985 NFL draft, but didn't appear in an NFL game until 1987; his entire career consisted of replacing an injured Ken Bell in games 3, 4, and 5 of the Broncos 1987 season. In the last of these games, he had 6 receptions for 87 yards (including a go-ahead 35-yard touchdown), 6 punt returns for 112 yards, and 3 kickoff returns for 91 yards. As of 2017, 290 all-purpose yards remains a Broncos rookie record.
