= Sammy Winder =

American football player (born 1959)

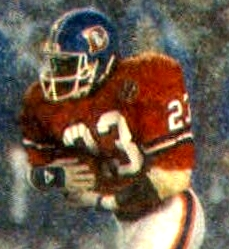
- Winder with the Denver Broncos in 1984

No. 23
- Position: Running back

Personal information
- Born: July 15, 1959 (age 67); Madison, Mississippi, U.S.
- Listed height: 5 ft 11 in (1.80 m)
- Listed weight: 203 lb (92 kg)

Career information
- High school: Madison-Ridgeland (Madison, Mississippi)
- College: Southern Miss
- NFL draft: 1982: 5th round, 131st overall pick

Career history
- Denver Broncos (1982–1990)

Awards and highlights
- 2× Pro Bowl (1984, 1986)

Career NFL statistics
- Rushing yards: 5,427
- Rushing average: 3.6
- Rushing touchdowns: 39
- Stats at Pro Football Reference

Sammy Winder (born July 15, 1959) is an American former professional football player who was a running back in the National Football League (NFL), spending his entire career with the Denver Broncos from 1982 to 1990. The son of a farmer, Winder played his high school football at Madison-Ridgeland High School in his hometown of Madison, Mississippi. Winder later played his collegiate football at The University of Southern Mississippi.

== College career ==
Winder played for Southern Mississippi from 1978 to 1981, rushing for 3,114 yards and 39 touchdowns, both school records. He also caught 11 passes for 70 yards. In his junior season, he rushed for 996 yards and a nation-leading 20 touchdowns. As a senior, he rushed for a career-high 1,029 yards and 12 more scores.

Winder's teammates at Southern Mississippi included future NFL players Reggie Collier and Louis Lipps. In his final two seasons, the team won 9 games each year and went 1–1 in bowl games.

== Professional career ==
Winder was a two-time Pro Bowl selection (1984 and 1986), and was a key reason the Broncos appeared in three Super Bowls in the 1980s (falling to the New York Giants, Washington Redskins and San Francisco 49ers). In his 9 seasons, Winder rushed for 5,427 yards and 39 touchdowns, while also catching 197 passes for 1,302 yards and 9 touchdowns. He was known for a signature touchdown celebration he called the 'Mississippi Mud Walk'. During his final two seasons, Winder was demoted to the second running back on the depth chart behind Bobby Humphrey, the Broncos 1989 supplemental draft pick out of the University of Alabama.

== NFL career statistics ==
Legend
**Bold**	Career high

Year	Team	Games		Rushing						Receiving					Fumbles	
Year	Team	GP	GS	Att	Yds	Avg	Y/G	Lng	TD	Rec	Yds	Avg	Lng	TD	Fum	FR
1982	DEN	8	2	67	259	**3.9**	32.4	18	1	11	83	7.5	22	0	1	1
1983	DEN	14	13	196	757	**3.9**	54.1	**52**	3	23	150	6.5	17	0	**7**	0
1984	DEN	**16**	**15**	**296**	**1,153**	**3.9**	**72.1**	24	4	**44**	**288**	6.5	21	2	5	**2**
1985	DEN	14	12	199	714	3.6	51.0	42	8	31	197	6.4	24	0	4	1
1986	DEN	**16**	**15**	240	789	3.3	49.3	31	**9**	26	171	6.6	20	**5**	2	1
1987	DEN	12	10	196	741	3.8	61.8	19	6	14	74	5.3	13	1	5	**2**
1988	DEN	**16**	12	149	543	3.6	33.9	35	4	17	103	6.1	14	1	1	0
1989	DEN	**16**	2	110	351	3.2	21.9	16	2	14	91	6.5	19	0	1	0
1990	DEN	15	2	42	120	2.9	8.0	19	2	17	145	**8.5**	17	0	2	0
Career		127	83	1,495	5,427	3.6	42.7	52	39	197	1,302	6.6	24	9	28	7

== After NFL career ==
Winder is now in the construction business. He owns and runs his own company, Winder Construction, which he started while still playing for the Denver Broncos in 1987.

== See also ==
- List of NCAA major college football yearly scoring leaders
