= Dean May =

American football player (born 1962)

No. 5, 14
- Position: Quarterback

Personal information
- Born: May 26, 1962 (age 64); Orlando, Florida, U.S.
- Listed height: 6 ft 5 in (1.96 m)
- Listed weight: 220 lb (100 kg)

Career information
- High school: Chamberlain High School
- College: Louisville
- NFL draft: 1984: 5th round, 138th overall pick

Career history
- Miami Dolphins (1984)*; Philadelphia Eagles (1984); Denver Broncos (1987)
- * Offseason or practice squad member only

Career NFL statistics
- Passing yards: 33
- TD–INT: 0-1
- Passer rating: 10.4
- Stats at Pro Football Reference

Dean Curtis May (born May 26, 1962) is an American former professional football player who was a quarterback in the National Football League (NFL) for the Philadelphia Eagles and Denver Broncos. After graduating from Chamberlain High School in Tampa, Florida in 1980, he played college football for the Louisville Cardinals. Second-team All-South Independent (1982)

Over the course of his NFL career he completed one pass in six attempts.
