= Monte McGuire =

American football player (born 1964)

No. 16
- Position: Quarterback

Personal information
- Born: May 7, 1964 (age 62); Abilene, Texas, U.S.
- Listed height: 6 ft 4 in (1.93 m)
- Listed weight: 202 lb (92 kg)

Career information
- High school: Monahans (Monahans, Texas)
- College: Texas Tech
- NFL draft: 1987: undrafted

Career history
- Denver Broncos (1987)

Career NFL statistics
- Passing yards: 23
- TD–INT: 0-0
- Passer rating: 89.6
- Stats at Pro Football Reference

Monte Lin McGuire (born May 7, 1964) is an American former professional football player who was a quarterback for the Denver Broncos of the National Football League (NFL). He played college football for the Texas Tech Red Raiders.
