= Scott Caldwell (American football) =

American football player (born 1963)

No. 28
- Position: Running back

Personal information
- Born: February 8, 1963 (age 63); Dallas, Texas, U.S.
- Listed height: 5 ft 10 in (1.78 m)
- Listed weight: 196 lb (89 kg)

Career information
- High school: Sam Houston (Arlington, Texas)
- College: Texas–Arlington (1981–1984)
- NFL draft: 1985: 8th round, 202nd overall pick

Career history
- Detroit Lions (1985–1986)*; Denver Broncos (1987)
- * Offseason or practice squad member only

Career NFL statistics
- Rushing yards: 53
- Rushing average: 3.3
- Receptions: 4
- Receiving yards: 34
- Stats at Pro Football Reference

Craig Scott "Scotty" Caldwell (born February 8, 1963) is an American former professional football player who was a running back for one season with the Denver Broncos of the National Football League (NFL). He played college football for the Texas–Arlington Mavericks and was selected by the Detroit Lions in the eighth round of the 1985 NFL draft.

== Early life and college ==
Craig Scott Caldwell was born on February 8, 1963, in Dallas, Texas. He attended Sam Houston High School in Arlington, Texas.

Caldwell was a member of the Texas–Arlington Mavericks of the University of Texas at Arlington from 1981 to 1984. He rushed nine times for 32 yards in 1981 while also catching two passes for 14 yards. He earned honorable mention All-American honors in 1984. Caldwell played in the East-West Shrine Game after his senior year. He was inducted into the school's athletics hall of fame in 2005.

== Professional career ==
Caldwell was selected by the Detroit Lions in the eighth round, with the 202nd overall pick, of the 1985 NFL draft. He officially signed with the team on July 21. However, he was later released on August 30, 1985. Caldwell signed with the Lions again in 1986 but was released on August 26, 1986.

Caldwell signed with the Denver Broncos on May 1, 1987, but was later released. On September 23, he signed with the Broncos during the 1987 NFL players strike. He played in all three strike games, starting one, for the Broncos and recorded 16 carries for 53 yards while also catching four passes for 34 yards. Caldwell was released on October 19, 1987, after the strike ended.
