= Matt Smith (American football) =

American football player (born 1965)

No. 57
- Position: Linebacker

Personal information
- Born: September 1, 1965 (age 61); Columbus, Ohio, U.S.
- Listed height: 6 ft 2 in (1.88 m)
- Listed weight: 234 lb (106 kg)

Career information
- High school: Lincoln (Gahanna, Ohio)
- College: West Virginia
- NFL draft: 1987: undrafted

Career history
- Denver Broncos (1987)

Awards and highlights
- Second-team All-East (1985)
- Stats at Pro Football Reference

Matthew Morgan Smith (born September 1, 1965) is an American former professional football linebacker who played for the Denver Broncos of the National Football League (NFL). He played college football at West Virginia University.
