= Tim Joiner =

American football player (1961–2023)

No. 47, 95
- Position: Linebacker

Personal information
- Born: January 7, 1961; Monrovia, California, U.S.
- Died: March 24, 2023 (aged 62); Baton Rouge, Louisiana, U.S.
- Listed height: 6 ft 4 in (1.93 m)
- Listed weight: 235 lb (107 kg)

Career information
- High school: Catholic (Baton Rouge, Louisiana)
- College: LSU
- NFL draft: 1983: 3rd round, 58th overall pick

Career history
- Houston Oilers (1983–1984); New Orleans Saints (1986)*; Denver Broncos (1987)
- * Offseason or practice squad member only

Career NFL statistics
- Fumble recoveries: 1
- Stats at Pro Football Reference

Timothy Lane Joiner (January 7, 1961 – March 24, 2023) was an American professional football player. He played as a linebacker in the National Football League (NFL) for the Houston Oilers and Denver Broncos. He appeared in 29 games and started in three games in his professional career.

Joiner was born in Monrovia, California, and attended Catholic High School in Baton Rouge, Louisiana. He attended Louisiana State University, where he played college football for the LSU Tigers.

Joiner died in Baton Rouge, Louisiana, on March 24, 2023, at the age of 62.
