= Jack Peavey =

American football player and coach (born 1963)

No. 71
- Position: Center

Personal information
- Born: June 6, 1963 (age 63); Attleboro, Massachusetts, U.S.
- Listed height: 6 ft 2 in (1.88 m)
- Listed weight: 260 lb (118 kg)

Career information
- High school: Foxboro
- College: Troy State
- NFL draft: 1985: undrafted

Career history

Playing
- New England Patriots (1985); Denver Broncos (1986–1987)

Coaching
- Jacksonville State (1988–1989) Special teams coordinator & offensive line coach; Arkansas (1990–1991) Offensive line coach & defensive line coach; Millersville (1992–1993) Special teams coordinator & offensive line coach; Rhode Island (1994–1995) Special teams coordinator & offensive line coach; Brown (1996) Tight ends coach; William Paterson (1997–1999) Head coach; Bishop Feehan HS (MA) (2000–2003) Head coach; Millsaps (2004) Offensive coordinator; Southwest Baptist (2005–2006) Head coach; Alabama State (2007) Assistant coach; Mississippi College (2008) Assistant coach; Texas A&M–Commerce (2009–2010) Assistant head coach & offensive line coach

Career NFL statistics
- Games played: 3
- Games started: 1
- Stats at Pro Football Reference

John A. Peavey (born June 6, 1963) is an American former professional football player and college coach. He served as the head football coach at William Paterson University from 1997 to 1999 and at Southwest Baptist University from 2005 to 2006, compiling a career college football record of 9–43. Peavey played professionally as a center in the National Football League (NFL) with the New England Patriots and the Denver Broncos.

== Coaching career ==
Peavey had great success as high school football coach with a record of 44–4–2. In four seasons as the head coach at Bishop Feehan High School in Attleboro, Peavey led the Shamrocks to four state championship title games and won three of them in a row. The Shamrocks were also league champions all four years. Peavey also helped lead Foxboro High School to back to back state championships.

Collegiately, Peavey is a former head football coach for the William Paterson University Pioneers football team in Wayne Township, New Jersey. He served for three years, 1997 to 1999, and compiled a 5–25 overall record (1–14 conference). A highlight during this otherwise unsuccessful campaign was leading the Pioneers to their first road win in 25 games and their first home victory in three years. In 1998, his offense led the conference in rushing. Peavey's only other collegiate head coaching job was at Southwest Baptist University, where he spent the 2005 and 2006 seasons. In two years, he compiled a 4–18 record, and then resigned in July 2007.

== Head coaching record ==
=== College ===
Year	Team	Overall	Conference	Standing	Bowl/playoffs
William Paterson Pioneers (New Jersey Athletic Conference) (1997–1999)
1997	William Paterson	0–10	0–5	6th	
1998	William Paterson	3–7	0–5	6th	
1999	William Paterson	2–8	1–4	5th	
William Paterson:		5–25	1–14		
Southwest Baptist Bearcats (NCAA Division II independent) (2005–2006)
2005	Southwest Baptist	3–8			
2006	Southwest Baptist	1–10			
Southwest Baptist:		4–18			
Total:		9–43			
