= Kevin Guidry =

American football player (born 1964)

No. 37, 27
- Position: Defensive back

Personal information
- Born: May 16, 1964 (age 62); Lake Charles, Louisiana, U.S.
- Listed height: 6 ft 0 in (1.83 m)
- Listed weight: 176 lb (80 kg)

Career information
- High school: Lake Charles
- College: LSU
- NFL draft: 1988: 3rd round, 79th overall pick

Career history
- Denver Broncos (1988); Phoenix Cardinals (1989); Atlanta Falcons (1990)*; Tampa Bay Storm (1991); Orlando Thunder (1992)
- * Offseason or practice squad member only

Awards and highlights
- ArenaBowl champion (1991)
- Stats at Pro Football Reference

Kevin Dale Guidry (born May 16, 1964) is an American former professional football player who was a defensive back in the National Football League (NFL). He played college football for the LSU Tigers and was selected by and played for the Denver Broncos in 1988 and for the Phoenix Cardinals in 1989. He moved into public office in 2004, when he was first elected to the Calcasieu Parish Police Jury, serving as Vice-President in 2008 and President in 2010. He ran as a Democratic Party nominee for the Louisiana House of Representatives in 2019 as a representative for District 34, but lost to fellow Democrat Wilford Carter.
