= Archie Harris (American football) =

American football player (born 1964)

No. 76
- Positions: Guard, tackle

Personal information
- Born: November 17, 1964 (age 61); Richmond, Virginia, U.S.
- Listed height: 6 ft 6 in (1.98 m)
- Listed weight: 270 lb (122 kg)

Career information
- High school: Huguenot (Richmond)
- College: William & Mary
- NFL draft: 1987: 7th round, 193rd overall pick

Career history
- Chicago Bears (1987)*; Denver Broncos (1987)
- * Offseason or practice squad member only

Career NFL statistics
- Games played: 3
- Stats at Pro Football Reference

Archie Lee Harris Jr. (born November 17, 1964) is an American former professional football player for the National Football League (NFL)'s Denver Broncos. He played offensive tackle for three games in 1987. Harris played college football at William & Mary.

Pre-draft measurables
Height	Weight	Arm length	Hand span	40-yard dash	10-yard split	20-yard split	Bench press
6 ft 5 7/8 in (1.98 m)	270 lb (122 kg)	32 1/4 in (0.82 m)	9 1/2 in (0.24 m)	5.08 s	1.80 s	2.98 s	31 reps
All values from NFL Combine

He was selected by the Chicago Bears in the seventh round of the 1987 NFL draft.

Harris appeared on the gameshow Who Wants to be a Millionaire on October 18, 2001.
