= Bryant Winn =

American football player (born 1961)

No. 55
- Position: Linebacker

Personal information
- Born: November 7, 1961 (age 65); Memphis, Tennessee, U.S.
- Listed height: 6 ft 4 in (1.93 m)
- Listed weight: 231 lb (105 kg)

Career information
- High school: Hamilton (Memphis)
- College: Houston (1981–1984)
- NFL draft: 1985: 12th round, 331st overall pick

Career history
- Washington Redskins (1985)*; Seattle Seahawks (1986)*; Denver Broncos (1987)
- * Offseason or practice squad member only
- Stats at Pro Football Reference

Bryant M. Winn (born November 7, 1961) is an American former professional football linebacker who played for the Denver Broncos of the National Football League (NFL). He played college football for the Houston Cougars and was selected by the Washington Redskins in the 12th round of the 1985 NFL draft.

== Early life ==
Bryant M. Winn was born on November 7, 1961, in Memphis, Tennessee. He attended Hamilton High School in Memphis.

== College career ==
Winn enrolled at the University of Houston to play college football for the Cougars. He did not earn a letter as a freshman in 1981 but ended up making the traveling team for the 1981 Sun Bowl. He was a three-year varsity letterman from 1982 to 1984. Winn started only seven games from 1981 to 1983 as a backup to Eugene Lockhart and Weedy Harris. Winn became the starter at inside linebacker his senior year in 1984, when he posted 167 tackles (the second most in school history at the time). He earned second-team All-Southwest Conference for the 1984 season and was also a team captain that year. Winn had one interception each in 1982, 1983, and 1984. At the conclusion of his college career, he played in the 1985 Senior Bowl. Winn graduated from Houston with an industrial technology degree.

== Professional career ==
Winn was selected by the Washington Redskins in the 12th round, with the 331st overall pick, of the 1985 NFL draft. He was released on August 27, 1985.

Winn signed with the Seattle Seahawks on April 15, 1986. He was later released on August 19, 1986.

On September 23, 1987, Winn signed with the Denver Broncos during the 1987 NFL players strike. He started all three strike games for the Broncos, recording two forced fumbles and one fumble recovery. He was released on November 3, 1987, after the strike ended.
