= Steve Fitzhugh =

American football player (born 1963)

No. 74
- Position: Defensive back

Personal information
- Born: May 11, 1961 (age 65); Akron, Ohio, U.S.
- Listed height: 5 ft 11 in (1.80 m)
- Listed weight: 188 lb (85 kg)

Career information
- High school: Walsh Jesuit
- College: Miami (OH)
- NFL draft: 1986: undrafted

Career history
- Denver Broncos (1986–1987)
- Stats at Pro Football Reference

Steve Fitzhugh (born January 28, 1963, in Akron, Ohio) is an American former professional football player who was a defensive back with the Denver Broncos of the National Football League (NFL). He began as a track and field all-star, becoming one of the top five sprinters in the country.

Fitzhugh attended Walsh Jesuit High School in Cuyahoga Falls, Ohio. There he was a highly touted football player and track star. He was highly recruited and selected Miami University on a full athletic scholarship to play football. There he was the captain of the football and track teams his senior year. Known as an "intimidating hitter", he was recruited by the NFL. He signed with the Denver Broncos in 1986. He was sidelined by a shoulder injury after two years in the league.

He is now an author, humorist and motivational speaker spending much of his time as a professional communicator, with teenagers about drugs, alcohol, and right choices. He travels around the nation and abroad as a guest speaker for a variety of venues including schools, colleges professional athletic teams, corporations, and penal institutions. Fitzhugh partnered with Ricky Bolden and Lon Solomon in co-founding The House, DC, three former crack houses transformed into an after-school youth center which services the under served population of Anacostia, Southeast Washington, DC. Fitzhugh is also the national spokesperson for the Fellowship of Christian Athletes 'OneWay2Play-Drug Free' program. He has also been to Jacksonville Illinois and told his life story about drugs.
