= Bruce Plummer =

American football player (born 1964)

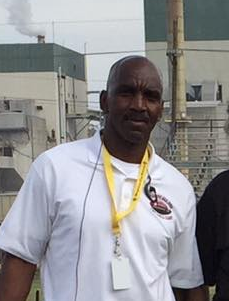
- Plummer in 2015

No. 38, 23, 28, 29, 18
- Position: Defensive back

Personal information
- Born: September 1, 1964 (age 62); Bogalusa, Louisiana, U.S.
- Listed height: 6 ft 0 in (1.83 m)
- Listed weight: 197 lb (89 kg)

Career information
- High school: Bogalusa
- College: Mississippi State
- NFL draft: 1987: 9th round, 250th overall pick

Career history
- Denver Broncos (1987–1988); Miami Dolphins (1988); Indianapolis Colts (1989); San Diego Chargers (1990); Denver Broncos (1990); San Francisco 49ers (1990); Philadelphia Eagles (1991); Winnipeg Blue Bombers (1992); BC Lions (1993); Albany Firebirds (1994–1995); Milwaukee Mustangs (1995); Memphis Pharaohs (1996); Arizona Rattlers (1997)

Awards and highlights
- ArenaBowl champion (1997)

Career NFL statistics
- Sacks: 1
- Interceptions: 2
- Fumble recoveries: 1
- Stats at Pro Football Reference

Career AFL statistics
- Tackles: 128
- Passes defended: 20
- Interceptions: 14
- Fumble recoveries: 2
- Stats at ArenaFan.com

Bruce Elliott Plummer (born September 1, 1964) is an American former professional football player who played defensive back in the National Football League (NFL). He played five seasons for the Denver Broncos (1987–1988, 1990), the Miami Dolphins (1988), the Indianapolis Colts (1989), the San Francisco 49ers (1990), and the Philadelphia Eagles (1991).

Pre-draft measurables
Height	Weight	Arm length	Hand span	40-yard dash	10-yard split	20-yard split	20-yard shuttle	Vertical jump	Broad jump
5 ft 11 7/8 in (1.83 m)	196 lb (89 kg)	30 1/4 in (0.77 m)	8 3/4 in (0.22 m)	4.57 s	1.55 s	2.57 s	4.17 s	29.5 in (0.75 m)	9 ft 10 in (3.00 m)
All values from NFL Combine

He was selected by the Broncos in the ninth round of the 1987 NFL draft with the 250th overall pick. Prior to entering the NFL, he played college football for Mississippi State University.

== Post-NFL career ==
After concluding his professional football career, Plummer went on to be employed for seven years at Bogalusa High School (2015–2022) as a teacher, seconding as an assistant football and baseball coach. He pursued a Master of Science degree in Coaching Education at Ohio University from 2018 to 2019, and in 2022 began working a full-time position as a Physical Education teacher at Pope John Paul II Catholic High School (2022–2024)

As of July 2024, he currently holds a position at Northshore High School as a Physical Education teacher.
