= Martin Rudolph =

American football player (born 1964)

No. 40
- Position: Cornerback

Personal information
- Born: October 19, 1964 (age 62); San Pedro, California, U.S.
- Listed height: 5 ft 10 in (1.78 m)
- Listed weight: 183 lb (83 kg)

Career information
- High school: Phineas Banning (Wilmington, California)
- College: Arizona
- NFL draft: 1987: undrafted

Career history
- Green Bay Packers (1987)*; Denver Broncos (1987)
- * Offseason or practice squad member only
- Stats at Pro Football Reference

Martin Jerome Rudolph (born October 19, 1964) is an American former professional football player who was a cornerback for the Denver Broncos of the National Football League (NFL). He played college football for the Arizona Wildcats.
