= Kevin Clark (American football) =

American football player and coach (born 1964)

No. 20, 27
- Positions: Defensive back, return specialist

Personal information
- Born: June 8, 1964 (age 62); Sacramento, California, U.S.

Career information
- College: San Jose State
- NFL draft: 1987: undrafted

Career history

Playing
- Denver Broncos (1987–1988); Dallas Cowboys (1989)*; Edmonton Eskimos (1990); British Columbia Lions (1990); Denver Broncos (1990–1991)
- * Offseason or practice squad member only

Coaching
- Frankfurt Galaxy (1991–1992) Defensive backs coach

Awards and highlights
- NFL Kickoff Return Leader (1990)
- Stats at Pro Football Reference

Kevin Randall Clark (born June 8, 1964) is an American former professional football player who was a defensive back and return specialist for four seasons with the Denver Broncos in the National Football League (NFL). He played college football for the San Jose State Spartans.

== Coaching career ==
Clark currently coaches in the Denver area with the private coaching service, CoachUp.
