= Mitch Andrews =

American football player (born 1964)

No. 86
- Position: Tight end

Personal information
- Born: March 4, 1964 (age 62); Houma, Louisiana, U.S.
- Listed height: 6 ft 2 in (1.88 m)
- Listed weight: 239 lb (108 kg)

Career information
- High school: H. L. Bourgeois (Gray, Louisiana)
- College: LSU (1982–1985)
- NFL draft: 1986: undrafted

Career history
- Denver Broncos (1986–1987); New York Jets (1989)*; New Orleans Saints (1989)*
- * Offseason or practice squad member only
- Stats at Pro Football Reference

Mitchell Dean Andrews (born March 4, 1964) is an American former professional football player who was a tight end for one season with the Denver Broncos of the National Football League (NFL). He played college football for the LSU Tigers.

== Early life and college ==
Mitchell Dean Andrews was born on March 4, 1964, in Houma, Louisiana. He attended H. L. Bourgeois High School in Gray, Louisiana.

Andrews was a four-year letterman for the LSU Tigers of Louisiana State University from 1982 to 1985. He caught three passes for 26 yards and one touchdown in 1982, 26 passes for 337 yards and one touchdown in 1983, 24 passes for 225 yards in 1984, and 34 passes for 277 yards and three touchdowns in 1985.

== Professional career ==
After going undrafted in the 1986 NFL draft, Andrews signed with the Denver Broncos on May 1. He was released on July 31, 1986. He was signed by the Broncos again the next year on May 1, 1987. Andrews was released again on August 17, re-signed on September 25, released on November 3, and re-signed on November 11, 1987. Overall, he played in eight games, starting three, for the Broncos during the 1987 season, catching four passes for 53 yards. He also appeared in two playoff games that season. Andrews was released by the Broncos for the final time on August 16, 1988.

Andrews was signed by the New York Jets in 1989, but later released on July 24, 1989.

He signed with the New Orleans Saints on August 1, 1989. He was released on September 4, re-signed the next day, and released again on September 9, 1989.
