= Bill Lobenstein =

American football player (born 1961)

No. 74
- Position: Defensive end

Personal information
- Born: May 11, 1961 (age 65); Mauston, Wisconsin, U.S.
- Listed height: 6 ft 3 in (1.91 m)
- Listed weight: 261 lb (118 kg)

Career information
- High school: Deerfield
- College: Wisconsin–Whitewater
- NFL draft: 1985: undrafted

Career history
- Denver Broncos (1985–1987)
- Stats at Pro Football Reference

Bill Lobenstein (born William Joseph Lobenstein on May 11, 1961) was a player in the National Football League for the Denver Broncos in 1987 as a defensive end.

== Biography ==
Lobenstein was born in Mauston, Wisconsin. He played at the University of Wisconsin–Madison, College of DuPage and the University of Wisconsin–Whitewater. His high school career took place in Deerfield at Deerfield High School.
