= Daryll Jones =

American football player (born 1962)

No. 43, 20
- Position: Safety

Personal information
- Born: April 23, 1962 (age 64); Columbus, Georgia, U.S.
- Listed height: 6 ft 0 in (1.83 m)
- Listed weight: 190 lb (86 kg)

Career information
- High school: Carver (Columbus)
- College: Georgia
- NFL draft: 1984: 7th round, 181st overall pick

Career history
- Green Bay Packers (1984–1985); Atlanta Falcons (1987)*; Denver Broncos (1987)
- * Offseason or practice squad member only

Awards and highlights
- National champion (1980)

Career NFL statistics
- Fumble recoveries: 3
- Stats at Pro Football Reference

Daryll Keith Jones (born March 23, 1962) is an American former professional football player who was a safety in the National Football League (NFL). He played college football for the Georgia Bulldogs.

== Early life and college ==
Jones was born Daryll Keith Jones on March 23, 1962 in Georgia.

He played at the collegiate level at the University of Georgia.

== Professional career ==
Jones was selected by the Green Bay Packers in the seventh round of the 1984 NFL draft and spent two seasons with the team. During his final season he was a member of the Denver Broncos.
