= Tony Boddie =

American football player (born 1960)

No. 24
- Position: Running back

Personal information
- Born: November 11, 1960 (age 65); Portsmith, Washington, U.S.
- Listed height: 5 ft 11 in (1.80 m)
- Listed weight: 195 lb (88 kg)

Career information
- College: Montana State

Career history
- 1983–1985: Los Angeles Express
- 1986–1987: Denver Broncos

Career NFL statistics
- Rushing yards: 9
- Rushing average: 2.3
- Rushing touchdowns: 1
- Receptions: 9
- Receiving yards: 85
- Stats at Pro Football Reference

Dominec LeAnthony "Tony" Boddie (born November 11, 1960) is an American former professional football player who was a running back in the United States Football League (USFL) and National Football League (NFL).

Boddie played college football for the Montana State Bobcats. He then spent three seasons with the Los Angeles Express of the USFL from 1983 to 1985, rushing for 642 yards and four touchdowns. He joined the Denver Broncos of the NFL the following year but appeared in just one game in the 1986 season. In 1987, he played five games for the Broncos, rushing for seven yards while also catching nine passes. He scored his only career touchdown in a Week 13 win over the New England Patriots. Boddie also appeared in all three Broncos postseason games and served as a pre-game captain in their Super Bowl XXII loss to the Washington Redskins. He was targeted only once in the game by quarterback John Elway.

Entering the 1988 season, Boddie was in a competition for the Broncos starting running back spot but injured his back in the preseason. He was eventually released by the Broncos and never appeared in another NFL game.

Boddie currently works as a regional sales manager for Nestle in Bremerton, Washington and is a volunteer football coach for Bremerton High School.
