= Roger Jackson (defensive back) =

American football player (born 1959)

No. 28, 25
- Position: Defensive back

Personal information
- Born: February 28, 1959 (age 67); Macon, Georgia, U.S.
- Listed height: 6 ft 0 in (1.83 m)
- Listed weight: 186 lb (84 kg)

Career information
- High school: Central (Macon)
- College: Bethune-Cookman (1978–1981)
- NFL draft: 1982: undrafted

Career history
- Denver Broncos (1982–1985, 1987)

Career NFL statistics
- Interceptions: 2
- Fumble recoveries: 1
- Sacks: 1
- Stats at Pro Football Reference

Roger Jackson (born February 28, 1959) is an American former professional football player who was a defensive back for five seasons with the Denver Broncos of the National Football League (NFL). He played college football for the Bethune–Cookman Wildcats.

== Early life and college ==
Roger Jackson was born on February 28, 1959, in Macon, Georgia. He attended Central High School in Macon.

Jackson was a four-year letterman for the Wildcats of Bethune–Cookman College from 1978 to 1981.

== Professional career ==
Jackson signed with the Denver Broncos on May 6, 1982, after going undrafted in the 1982 NFL draft. He played in nine games for the Broncos during the 1982 season and recovered one fumble. He appeared in all 16 games, starting three, in 1983, recording one interception and one sack. Jackson also played in one playoff game that year. He was waived on August 27, 1984, but re-signed the next day. He played in all 16 games for the second consecutive season in 1984 and made one interception. He also appeared in a playoff game. Jackson was waived on September 2, 1985, but recalled from waivers the next day. He appeared in nine games for the Broncos in 1985, and became a free agent after the season.

On September 29, 1987, Jackson was signed by the Broncos during the 1987 NFL players strike. He played in three games, starting two, that year. He was released on October 19, 1987, after the strike ended.

== Scouting career ==
Jackson was a scout for nine years with the Minnesota Vikings, two with the Kansas City Chiefs and two with the Denver Broncos.
