= Marc Munford =

American football player (born 1965)

No. 51
- Position: Linebacker

Personal information
- Born: February 14, 1965 (age 61); Lincoln, Nebraska, U.S.
- Listed height: 6 ft 2 in (1.88 m)
- Listed weight: 231 lb (105 kg)

Career information
- High school: Heritage (Littleton, Colorado)
- College: Nebraska
- NFL draft: 1987: 4th round, 111th overall pick

Career history
- Denver Broncos (1987–1990); Kansas City Chiefs (1991)

Awards and highlights
- First-team All-American (1984); 2× First-team All-Big Eight (1985, 1986); Second-team All-Big Eight (1984)

Career NFL statistics
- Sacks: 1
- Interceptions: 2
- Fumble recoveries: 3
- Stats at Pro Football Reference

Marc Christopher Munford (born February 14, 1965) is an American former professional football player who was a linebacker in the National Football League (NFL).

== Early life and college ==
Munford was born in Lincoln, Nebraska and attended Heritage High School in Littleton, Colorado. He played college football at the University of Nebraska–Lincoln, where he was a three-time All-Big Eight Conference selection by the Associated Press. He earned second-team recognition as a sophomore, and first-team as both a junior and senior. As a sophomore, he was also honored by Gannett News Service as a first-team All-American.

Munford was inducted into the Nebraska Football Hall of Fame in 1997.

== Professional career ==
Pre-draft measurables
Height	Weight	Arm length	Hand span	40-yard dash	10-yard split	20-yard split	20-yard shuttle	Vertical jump	Broad jump	Bench press
6 ft 2 in (1.88 m)	238 lb (108 kg)	30 1/2 in (0.77 m)	9 in (0.23 m)	4.78 s	1.68 s	2.76 s	4.31 s	3.0 in (0.08 m)	9 ft 2 in (2.79 m)	15 reps
All values from NFL Combine

Munford was selected by the Denver Broncos in the fourth round of the 1987 NFL draft, and spent four years with the team. He started 16 of the 48 games in which he appeared, with two interceptions, one sack, and three fumble recoveries. He signed with the Kansas City Chiefs for the 1991 season, as a "Plan B" free-agent, but spent the year on the injured reserve list.

In 2003, Munford was hired as the head coach for the Lincoln Capitals of the National Indoor Football League. He led the Capitals to a 9-5 record and a second place finish in the NIFL's Pacific North Division.
