= Dan Remsberg =

American football player (born 1962)

No. 74
- Position: Offensive tackle

Personal information
- Born: April 7, 1962 (age 64); Temple, Texas, U.S.
- Listed height: 6 ft 6 in (1.98 m)
- Listed weight: 275 lb (125 kg)

Career information
- High school: Temple
- College: Abilene Christian
- NFL draft: 1985: 9th round, 252nd overall pick

Career history
- San Diego Chargers (1985)*; Denver Broncos (1986–1987); Philadelphia Eagles (1988)*
- * Offseason or practice squad member only

Career NFL statistics
- Games played: 21
- Stats at Pro Football Reference

Daniel Lloyd Remsberg (born April 7, 1962) is an American former professional football player who was a tackle in the National Football League (NFL). He played college football for the Abilene Christian Wildcats and was selected by the San Diego Chargers in the ninth round of the 1985 NFL draft with the 252nd overall pick. He played for the Denver Broncos from 1986 to 1987.
