= Steve Bryan (American football) =

American football player (born 1964)

No. 79, 95
- Positions: Defensive end, linebacker

Personal information
- Born: May 6, 1964 (age 62); Wagoner, Oklahoma, U.S.
- Listed height: 6 ft 2 in (1.88 m)
- Listed weight: 256 lb (116 kg)

Career information
- High school: Coweta (Coweta, Oklahoma)
- College: Oklahoma (1982–1986)
- NFL draft: 1987: 5th round, 120th overall pick

Career history
- Chicago Bears (1987)*; Denver Broncos (1987–1989)
- * Offseason or practice squad member only

Awards and highlights
- National champion (1985); First-team All-Big Eight (1986)

Career NFL statistics
- Games played: 12
- Games started: 3
- Fumble recoveries: 1
- Stats at Pro Football Reference

Steven Ray Bryan (born May 6, 1964) is an American former professional football defensive end and linebacker who played in the National Football League (NFL) with the Denver Broncos. He played college football for the Oklahoma Sooners.

== Early life ==
Bryan was born on May 6, 1964, in Wagoner, Oklahoma. He attended Coweta High School in Coweta, Oklahoma.

== College career ==
Bryan played college football for the Oklahoma Sooners from 1982 to 1986. He started as a tight end and redshirted in 1982. Bryan moved to defense and played defensive end and defensive tackle. He was a starter on the 1985 national championship team and was named to the first-team All-Big Eight team in 1986.

== Professional career ==
=== Chicago Bears ===
Bryan was selected in the fifth round, with the 120th overall selection, by the Chicago Bears in the 1987 NFL draft. He officially signed with the team on July 31, 1987. On September 7, Bryan was waived by the team.

=== Denver Broncos ===
On September 25, 1987, Bryan was signed by the Denver Broncos as a result of the NFL Players Strike. He started all three replacement games and played in a one further game in 1987.

Bryan started the season on the injured reserve due to a knee injury. On October 24, 1988, he was activated after starter, Sam Graddy, suffered an injury. Bryan played in eight games and had a fumble recovery against the Los Angeles Rams. On July 24, 1989, he was released by team.

== Personal life ==
Bryan's brother, Rick Bryan, was an Unanimous All-American and defensive end for the Atlanta Falcons for ten seasons.
