= Tim Lucas (American football) =

American football player (born 1961)

No. 50, 48, 58, 59
- Position: Linebacker

Personal information
- Born: April 3, 1961 (age 65); Stockton, California, U.S.
- Listed height: 6 ft 3 in (1.91 m)
- Listed weight: 230 lb (104 kg)

Career information
- High school: Rio Vista (Rio Vista, California)
- College: California
- NFL draft: 1983: 10th round, 269th overall pick

Career history
- St. Louis Cardinals (1983)*; Oakland Invaders (1983-1985); St. Louis Cardinals (1986)*; San Diego Chargers (1987)*; Denver Broncos (1987–1993)
- * Offseason or practice squad member only

Career NFL statistics
- Sacks: 5
- Fumble recoveries: 2
- Interceptions: 1
- Stats at Pro Football Reference

Tim Lucas (born April 3, 1961) is an American former professional football player who was a linebacker for seven seasons with the Denver Broncos of the National Football League (NFL). He played college football for the California Golden Bears. He was picked by the St. Louis Cardinals in the 10th round (269th overall) of the 1983 NFL Draft.
