= Keith Kartz =

American football player (born 1963)

No. 60, 72
- Positions: Center, tackle, guard

Personal information
- Born: May 5, 1963 (age 63); Las Vegas, Nevada, U.S.
- Listed height: 6 ft 4 in (1.93 m)
- Listed weight: 270 lb (122 kg)

Career information
- High school: San Dieguito (Encinitas, California)
- College: California
- NFL draft: 1986: undrafted

Career history
- Seattle Seahawks (1986)*; Denver Broncos (1987–1994)
- * Offseason or practice squad member only

Awards and highlights
- First-team All-Pac-10 (1985)

Career NFL statistics
- Games played: 100
- Games started: 88
- Fumble recoveries: 6
- Stats at Pro Football Reference

Keith Leonard Kartz (born May 5, 1963) is an American former professional football player who was a center and tackle for the Denver Broncos of the National Football League (NFL). In 1990, he started in Super Bowl XXIV as a center for the Broncos. He played college football for the California Golden Bears.

== Early life and education ==
Kartz was born in Las Vegas, Nevada, and went to San Dieguito High School in Encinitas, California. He was a high school football standout, but lost his senior season to knee injury.

== College career ==
A student at the University of California, Berkeley, Kartz played for the California Golden Bears. At the end of his senior season, he was named to the All-Pac-10 first team.
