= Tony Colorito =

American football player (born 1964)

No. 69
- Position: Nose tackle

Personal information
- Born: September 8, 1964 (age 62); Brooklyn, New York, U.S.
- Listed height: 6 ft 5 in (1.96 m)
- Listed weight: 260 lb (118 kg)

Career information
- High school: Midwood (Brooklyn, New York)
- College: USC
- NFL draft: 1986: 5th round, 134th overall pick

Career history
- Denver Broncos (1986–1987)

Career NFL statistics
- Fumble recoveries: 2
- Stats at Pro Football Reference

Anthony Ivor Colorito (born September 8, 1964) is a former football player for the Denver Broncos in the National Football League (NFL).

== Biography ==
Colorito was born in Brooklyn, New York. He attended Midwood High School.

He then attended USC, where he was an All American in football for the USC Trojans, and was an all-conference selection in his final season.

He was drafted by the Denver Broncos in the fifth round of the 1986 NFL draft. He played nose tackle. In 1986, he played in 15 games for the Broncos, made 18 tackles and had two fumble recoveries. His career ended early when he suffered a knee injury in a 1987 exhibition game.
