= Rick Massie =

American football player (born 1960)

No. 83, 85
- Position: Wide receiver

Personal information
- Born: January 16, 1960 (age 66); Paris, Kentucky, U.S.
- Listed height: 6 ft 1 in (1.85 m)
- Listed weight: 190 lb (86 kg)

Career information
- High school: Bourbon County (Paris)
- College: Kentucky
- Supplemental draft: 1984: 2nd round, 46th overall pick

Career history
- Calgary Stampeders (1984); Denver Broncos (1987–1988)
- Stats at Pro Football Reference

Richard Ray Massie (born January 16, 1960) is an American former professional football player who was a wide receiver in the National Football League (NFL). He was selected by the Denver Broncos in the second round of the 1984 NFL Supplemental draft with the 46th pick. He played for the Calgary Stampeders in 1984 and the Broncos from 1987 to 1988.
