= Winford Hood =

American football player (born 1962)

No. 74, 78
- Positions: Guard, tackle

Personal information
- Born: March 29, 1962 (age 64); Atlanta, Georgia, U.S.
- Listed height: 6 ft 3 in (1.91 m)
- Listed weight: 262 lb (119 kg)

Career information
- College: Georgia
- NFL draft: 1984: 8th round, 207th overall pick

Career history
- Denver Broncos (1984–1988); Phoenix Cardinals (1989)*
- * Offseason or practice squad member only

Awards and highlights
- Second-team All-SEC (1983)

Career NFL statistics
- Games played: 47
- Games started: 9
- Stats at Pro Football Reference

Winford DeWayne Hood (born March 29, 1962) is an American former professional football player who was an offensive lineman for five seasons with the Denver Broncos of the National Football League (NFL). He played college football for the Georgia Bulldogs. He graduated from Therrell High School in Atlanta.
