= Mike Freeman (guard) =

American football player (born 1961)

No. 62, 61
- Position: Guard

Personal information
- Born: October 13, 1961 (age 65); Mount Holly, New Jersey, U.S.

Career information
- College: Arizona

Career history
- Denver Broncos (1984, 1986–1987); Los Angeles Raiders (1988); Denver Dynamite (1990–1991)

Awards and highlights
- Second-team All-Pac-10 (1983)

Career statistics
- Games played: 28
- Games started: 9
- Stats at Pro Football Reference

Career AFL statistics
- Tackles: 12
- Sacks: 2.5
- Pass break-ups: 3
- Fumble recoveries: 2
- Stats at ArenaFan.com

Michael Joseph Freeman (born October 13, 1961) is an American former professional football player who was a guard for four seasons with the Denver Broncos and the Los Angeles Raiders of the National Football League (NFL). He played college football for the Arizona Wildcats.
