= Bruce Klosterman =

American football player (born 1963)

No. 97
- Position: Linebacker

Personal information
- Born: April 17, 1963 (age 63); Dubuque, Iowa, U.S.
- Listed height: 6 ft 4 in (1.93 m)
- Listed weight: 230 lb (104 kg)

Career information
- High school: Beckman Catholic (Dyersville, Iowa)
- College: South Dakota State
- NFL draft: 1986: 8th round, 217th overall pick

Career history
- Denver Broncos (1986–1989); Los Angeles Raiders (1990)*; Los Angeles Rams (1990); Los Angeles Raiders (1991)*
- * Offseason or practice squad member only

Awards and highlights
- Second-team All-North Central (1985)
- Stats at Pro Football Reference

Bruce Donald Klostermann (born April 17, 1963) is an American former professional football player who was a linebacker in the National Football League (NFL). He played college football for the South Dakota State Jackrabbits.

== Early life ==
Klostermann was born in Dubuque, Iowa, and grew up in Dyersville and attended Beckman Catholic High School, where he played fullback and linebacker on the football team and point guard on the basketball team. He was a co-captain of the football team along with future NFL first round pick Mike Haight.

== College career ==
Klostermann began his collegiate career at Waldorf Junior College before transferring to the University of Iowa as a walk-on. He attended Iowa for one semester before transferring to South Dakota State University. In his first season with the Jackrabbits, Klostermnan finished second on the team with 107 tackles. Klostermann was named second-team All-North Central Conference as a senior after he led the team in fumble recoveries and tackles for loss and finished second on the team in tackles and sacks.

== Professional career ==
Klostermann was selected in the eighth round of the 1986 NFL draft by the Denver Broncos. He injured his knee during training camp and spent the 1986 season on injured reserve. Klostermann played in 37 games with five starts over three seasons with the Broncos and played in Super Bowl XXI, Super Bowl XXII and Super Bowl XXIV. He was signed by the Oakland Raiders in 1990 but was cut on August 28. Klostermann was signed by the Los Angeles Rams on November 28, 1990 to play the rest of the season.

== Personal life ==
Klostermann is married to Nancy and has three children: Erin, Zach, and Alyssa. Zach played football at Wartburg College, Erin played volleyball at St. Louis University while Alyssa played volleyball at the University of Iowa.
