= Orson Mobley =

American gridiron football player (born 1963)

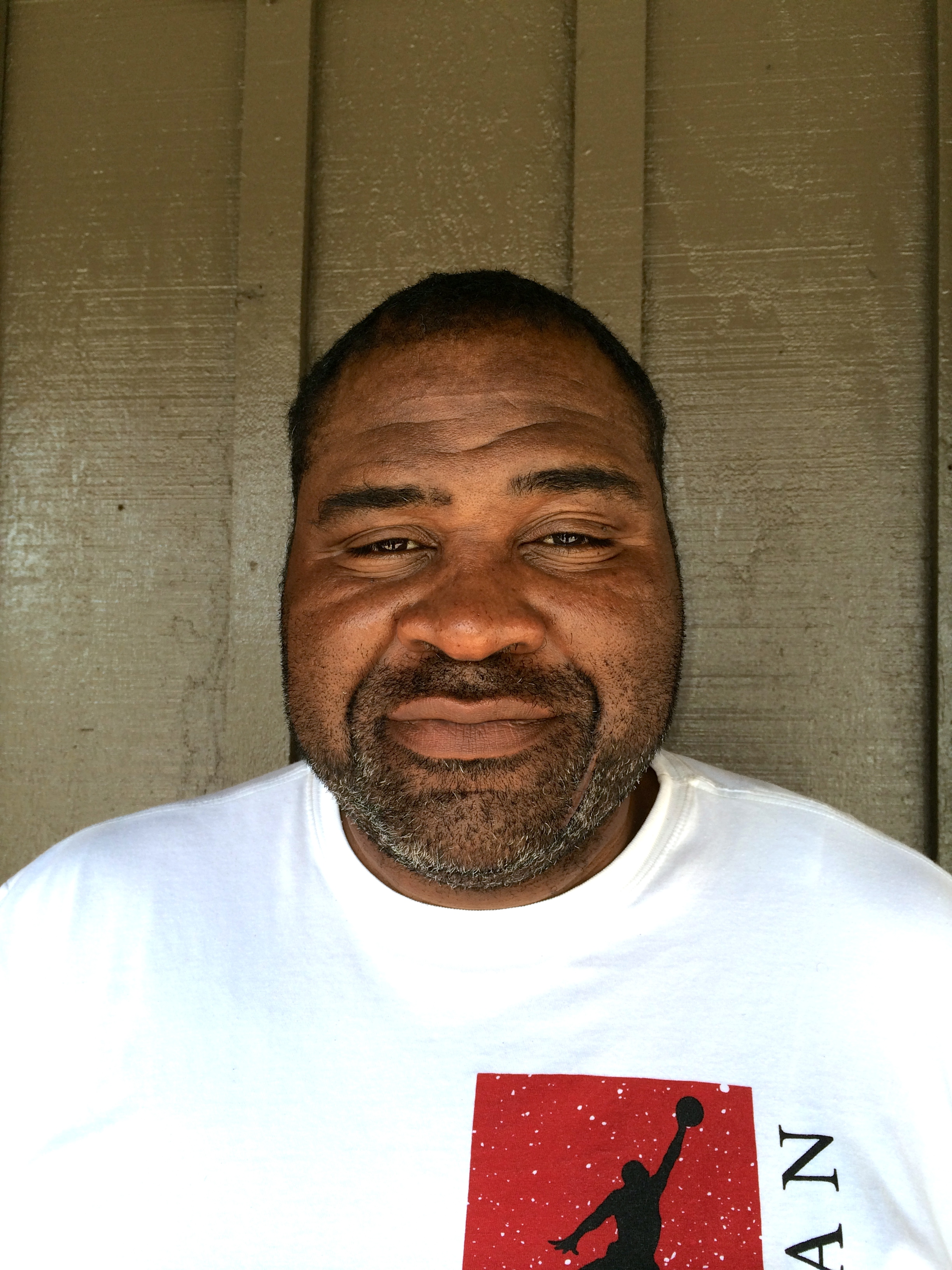
- Mobley in Palm Coast Florida

No. 89
- Position: Tight end

Personal information
- Born: March 4, 1963 (age 63); Brooksville, Florida, U.S.
- Listed height: 6 ft 5 in (1.96 m)
- Listed weight: 256 lb (116 kg)

Career information
- High school: Miami Palmetto (Pinecrest, Florida)
- College: Salem; Florida State
- NFL draft: 1986: 6th round, 151st overall pick

Career history
- Denver Broncos (1986–1990); Indianapolis Colts (1990); Miami Dolphins (1992)*
- * Offseason or practice squad member only

Career NFL statistics
- Receptions: 84
- Receiving yards: 1,019
- Receiving touchdowns: 4
- Stats at Pro Football Reference

Orson Odell Mobley (born March 4, 1963) is an American former professional football player who was a tight end for five seasons with the Denver Broncos of the National Football League (NFL). He was selected in the sixth round of the 1986 NFL draft. Mobley played in three Super Bowls (XXI, XXII, XXIV), and started in two of them. He ran into problems with the league late in his career and was suspended for substance abuse violations.

== College career ==
Mobley signed with Florida State University out of high school, then transferred from Florida State where he played football and baseball to Salem where he played both tight end and punter for Terry Bowden and starred along with future Florida State Head Coach Jimbo Fisher. Mobley won All-West Virginia Conference honors at Salem.

== Professional career ==
Mobley was picked 151st overall pick in the sixth round of the 1986 NFL Draft by the Denver Broncos. He caught a career high 22 passes and averaged 15.1 yards per reception as a rookie. Mobley's blocking paved the way for Bobby Humphrey to run for consecutive 1,000 yard seasons.

Mobley was named Bronco's Player of the Game after having 6 receptions for 55 yards vs. the Browns on November 13, 1988. He played in three Super Bowls.

=== Receiving record ===
| Year | No. | Yards | Avg. | TD |
|---|---|---|---|---|
| 1986 | 22 | 332 | 15.1 | 1 |
| 1987 | 16 | 228 | 14.3 | 1 |
| 1988 | 21 | 218 | 10.4 | 2 |
| 1989 | 17 | 200 | 11.8 | 0 |
| 1990 | 8 | 41 | 5.1 | 0 |
| Totals | 84 | 1,019 | 12.1 | 4 |

== Personal life ==
Mobley currently lives in Jacksonville, Florida. During his time in the NFL, he was suspended by the league for illegal substance use. In 1988, he was arresested and later acquitted on a domestic violence charge over an alleged assault in Aurora, Coloraldo. In 1995,he also was arrested in the Tampa Bay for alleged sexual assault of two women.

== Media references ==
On the show Night After Night with Allan Havey, Orson Mobley was portrayed as the owner of a dodgy fictional New Jersey hotel, the Mobley Hotel. The dilapidated hotel was where guests of the show were put up.
