= 1984 Denver Broncos season =

American football team season

- Owner: Pat Bowlen
- Head coach: Dan Reeves
- Defensive coordinator: Joe Collier
- Home stadium: Mile High Stadium

Results
- Record: 13–3
- Division place: 1st AFC West
- Playoffs: Lost Divisional Playoffs (vs. Steelers) 17–24

Uniform
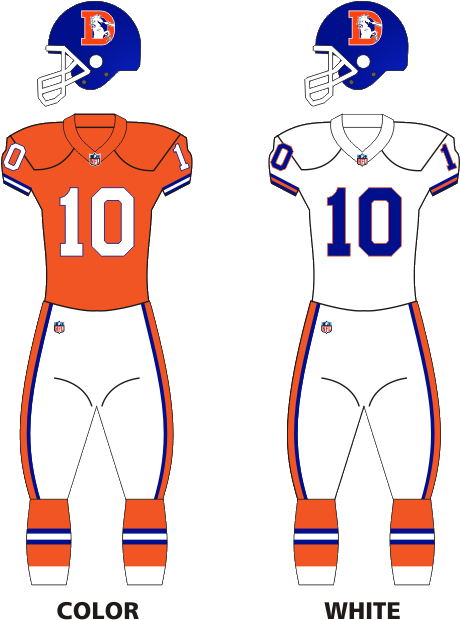

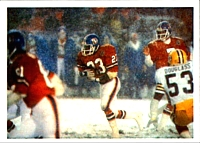
Broncos running back Sammy Winder rushing the ball against the Green Bay Packers in 1984

The 1984 Denver Broncos season was the franchise's 15th season in the National Football League (NFL), and the 25th overall. The team finished with its then franchise-best record of thirteen wins and three losses and were champions of the AFC West. In the playoffs, the Broncos were upset by the Pittsburgh Steelers in the Divisional Round, 24–17. This would be the final season for Tight End coach Fran Polsfoot, who died in April 1985.

== Offseason ==
=== NFL draft ===
1984 Denver Broncos draft
Round	Pick	Player	Position	College	Notes
2	46	Andre Townsend	Defensive end	Mississippi	1984-1990 (7 seasons)
3	78	Tony Lilly	Defensive back	Florida	1984-1987 (4 seasons)
4	89	Randy Robbins	Defensive back	Arizona	1984-1991 (8 seasons) then New England in 1992
6	159	Aaron Smith	Linebacker	Utah State	1984
7	186	Clarence Kay	Tight end	Georgia	1984-1992 (9 seasons)
8	207	Winford Hood	Guard	Georgia	1984-1988 (5 seasons)
8	218	Scott Garnett	Defensive tackle	Washington	1984 then San Diego/San Francisco in 1985, and Buffalo in 1987
9	245	Chris Brewer	Running back	Arizona	1984 then Chicago in 1987
10	272	Bobby Micho	Tight end	Texas	
11	299	Gene Lang	Running back	LSU	1984-1987 (4 seasons) then played for Atlanta from 1988-1990
12	326	Murray Jarman	Wide receiver	Clemson	
Made roster

== Personnel ==
=== Staff ===
1984 Denver Broncos staff
Front office: President and Chief Executive Officer – Pat Bowlen; Assistant General Manager – John Beake; Coordinator of College Scouting – Reed Johnson; Head coaches: Head Coach – Dan Reeves; Assistant Head Coach/Defense – Joe Collier; Offensive coaches: Running Backs – Nick Nicolau; Wide Receivers – Mike Shanahan; Offensive Line – Marvin Bass; Offensive Line – Alex Gibbs	Defensive coaches: Defensive Line – Stan Jones; Linebackers – Myrel Moore; Defensive Backs – Charlie West; Special teams coaches: Special Teams/Tight Ends – Fran Polsfoot; Strength and conditioning: Strength/Conditioning – IJ Gorman

=== Roster ===
1984 Denver Broncos roster
Quarterbacks (QB): 7 John Elway; 8 Gary Kubiak; Running backs (RB): 26 Chris Brewer; 33 Gene Lang; 39 Jesse Myles; 24 Rick Parros; 47 Gerald Willhite; 23 Sammy Winder; Wide receivers (WR): 80 Ray Alexander; 86 Butch Johnson; 84 Clint Sampson; 81 Steve Watson; Tight ends (TE): 88 Clarence Kay; 85 Don Summers; 87 James Wright	Offensive linemen (OL): 54 Keith Bishop G; 64 Billy Bryan C; 62 Mike Freeman G/C; 72 Marsharne Graves T; 78 Winford Hood T; 60 Paul Howard G; 67 Glenn Hyde G; 76 Ken Lanier T; 70 Dave Studdard T; Defensive linemen (DL): 65 Walt Bowyer DE; 68 Rubin Carter DT; 79 Barney Chavous DE; 66 Scott Garnett DT; 75 Rulon Jones DE; 69 Brison Manor DE; 61 Andre Townsend DE	Linebackers (LB): 58 Steve Busick ILB; 59 Darren Comeaux ILB; 55 Rick Dennison ILB; 98 Ricky Hunley OLB; 57 Tom Jackson OLB; 77 Karl Mecklenburg ILB; 50 Jim Ryan OLB; 52 Ken Woodard OLB; Defensive backs (DB): 43 Steve Foley FS; 31 Mike Harden CB; 28 Roger Jackson CB/S; 22 Tony Lilly FS; 48 Randy Robbins SS; 49 Dennis Smith SS; 45 Steve Wilson CB; 20 Louis Wright CB; Special teams (ST): 3 Rich Karlis K; 4 Chris Norman P	Practice squad: None - Vacant; Reserve: 12 Scott Brunner QB (IR); 63 Mark Cooper G (IR); -- Jim Joyce DE (IR); 29 Wilbur Myers S (IR); 83 John Sawyer TE (IR); -- Aaron Smith LB (IR); -- Rob Swanke NT (IR); 51 Bob Swenson LB (IR); Rookies in italics 49 active, 8 reserve, 0 practice squad

== Preseason ==
=== Schedule ===
Week	Date	Opponent	Result	Record	Venue	Attendance
1	August 4	Washington Redskins	L 13–16	0–1	Mile High Stadium	31,716
2	August 11	San Francisco 49ers	W 21–20	1–1	Mile High Stadium	70,211
3	August 18	Indianapolis Colts	W 31–0	2–1	Mile High Stadium	68,951
4	August 24	at Atlanta Falcons	W 24–13	3–1	Atlanta–Fulton County Stadium	30,988

== Regular season ==
=== Schedule ===
Week	Date	Opponent	Result	Record	Venue	Attendance
1	September 2	Cincinnati Bengals	**W** 20–17	1–0	Mile High Stadium	74,178
2	September 9	at Chicago Bears	**L** 0–27	1–1	Soldier Field	54,335
3	September 16	at Cleveland Browns	**W** 24–14	2–1	Cleveland Stadium	61,980
4	September 23	**Kansas City Chiefs**	**W** 21–0	3–1	Mile High Stadium	74,263
5	September 30	**Los Angeles Raiders**	**W** 16–13	4–1	Mile High Stadium	74,833
6	October 7	at Detroit Lions	**W** 28–7	5–1	Pontiac Silverdome	55,836
7	October 15	Green Bay Packers	**W** 17–14	6–1	Mile High Stadium	62,546
8	October 21	at Buffalo Bills	**W** 37–7	7–1	Rich Stadium	31,204
9	October 28	at **Los Angeles Raiders**	**W** 22–19 (OT)	8–1	Los Angeles Memorial Coliseum	91,020
10	November 4	New England Patriots	**W** 26–19	9–1	Mile High Stadium	74,908
11	November 11	at **San Diego Chargers**	**W** 16–13	10–1	Jack Murphy Stadium	53,162
12	November 18	Minnesota Vikings	**W** 42–21	11–1	Mile High Stadium	74,716
13	November 25	**Seattle Seahawks**	**L** 24–27	11–2	Mile High Stadium	74,922
14	December 2	at **Kansas City Chiefs**	**L** 13–16	11–3	Arrowhead Stadium	38,494
15	December 9	**San Diego Chargers**	**W** 16–13	12–3	Mile High Stadium	74,867
16	December 15	at **Seattle Seahawks**	**W** 31–14	13–3	Kingdome	64,411
Note: Intra-division opponents are in **bold** text.

=== Game summaries ===
==== Week 2 (Sunday, September 9, 1984): at Chicago Bears ====
Week 2: Denver Broncos at Chicago Bears – Game summary

Quarter	1	2	3	4	Total
Broncos (1–1)	0	0	0	0	**0**
**Bears** (2–0)	10	17	0	0	**27**

at Soldier Field • Chicago, Illinois

- Date: September 9
- Game time: 11:00 a.m. MDT
- Game attendance: 54,335
- Referee: Gene Barth
- TV announcers (NBC): Don Criqui (play–by–play) and Bob Trumpy (color commentator)

Team	Category	Player	Statistics
DEN	Passing		
DEN	Rushing		
DEN	Receiving		
CHI	Passing		
CHI	Rushing		
CHI	Receiving		

Scoring summary

Quarter	Time	Drive			Team	Scoring information	Score	
Quarter	Time	Plays	Yards	TOP	Team	Scoring information	DEN	CHI
1	10:05				Bears	38-yard field goal by Thomas	0	3
1	3:13				Bears	Gault 61-yard touchdown reception from McMahon, Thomas kick good	0	10
2	9:49				Bears	Payton 72-yard touchdown run, Thomas kick good	0	17
2	2:43				Bears	26-yard field goal by Thomas	0	20
2	0:24				Bears	Suhey 4-yard touchdown run, Thomas kick good	0	27
"TOP" = time of possession. For other American football terms, see Glossary of American football.							0	27

- Point spread:
- Over/under:
- Time of game:

Broncos	Game statistics	Bears
	First downs	
	Rushes–yards	
	Passing yards	
	Passes	
	Sacked–yards	
	Net passing yards	
	Total yards	
	Return yards	
	Punts	
	Fumbles–lost	
	Penalties–yards	
	Time of possession	

Individual stats

==== Week 7 vs. Packers ====
Green Bay Packers (1–5) at Denver Broncos (5–1)

Quarter	1	2	3	4	Total
Packers	0	0	7	7	**14**
Broncos	14	3	0	0	**17**

at Mile High Stadium • Denver, Colorado

- Date: October 15
- Game time: 9:00 p.m. EDT
- Game weather: Snow • 32 °F (0 °C) • Wind 4
- Game attendance: 62,546
- Referee: Gordon McCarter
- TV announcers (ABC): Frank Gifford, Don Meredith, and O. J. Simpson
- Pro-Football-Reference.com

Game information

Packers

- Lynn Dickey
  27/37, 371 Yds, TD, INT
- Jessie Clark
  11 Rush, 37 Yds
- James Lofton
  11 Rec, 206 Yds, TD

Broncos

- John Elway
  11/20, 101 Yds, INT
- Sammy Winder
  29 Rush, 86 Yds
- Steve Watson
  4 Rec, 42 Yds

Scoring summary

Quarter	Time	Drive			Team	Scoring information	Score	
Quarter	Time	Plays	Yards	TOP	Team	Scoring information	GB	DEN
1					Broncos	Fumble recovery returned 22 yards for touchdown by Foley, Karlis kick good	0	7
1					Broncos	Fumble recovery returned 27 yards for touchdown by Wright, Karlis kick good	0	14
2					Broncos	30-yard field goal by Karlis	0	17
3					Packers	Ellis 5-yard touchdown run, Garcia kick good	7	17
4					Packers	Lofton 54-yard touchdown reception from Dickey, Garcia kick good	14	17
"TOP" = time of possession. For other American football terms, see Glossary of American football.							14	17

=== Standings ===
AFC West
	W	L	T	PCT	DIV	CONF	PF	PA	STK
^{(2)} Denver Broncos	13	3	0	.813	6–2	10–2	353	241	W2
^{(4)} Seattle Seahawks	12	4	0	.750	5–3	8–4	418	282	L2
^{(5)} Los Angeles Raiders	11	5	0	.688	5–3	8–4	368	278	L1
Kansas City Chiefs	8	8	0	.500	4–4	7–7	314	324	W3
San Diego Chargers	7	9	0	.438	0–8	3–9	394	413	L2

== Postseason ==
Round	Date	Opponent (seed)	Result	Record	Venue	Attendance
Divisional	December 30	Pittsburgh Steelers (3)	L 17–24	0–1	Mile High Stadium	74,981

=== Playoff game summaries ===
==== 1984 AFC Divisional Playoffs (Sunday, December 30, 1984): vs. (3) Pittsburgh Steelers ====
AFC Divisional Playoffs: Pittsburgh Steelers at Denver Broncos – Game summary

Quarter	1	2	3	4	Total
Steelers (1–0)	0	10	7	7	24
Broncos (0–1)	7	0	10	0	17

at Mile High Stadium • Denver, Colorado

- Date: December 30
- Game time: 2:00 p.m. MST
- Game weather: 33 degrees, 58 humidity, 6 wind chill
- Game attendance: 74,981
- Referee: Fred Wyant
- TV announcers (NBC): Dick Enberg (play–by–play), Merlin Olsen (color commentator) and Ahmad Rashad (sideline reporter)

Team	Category	Player	Statistics
PIT	Passing	Mark Malone	17/28, 224 YDS, 1 TD
PIT	Rushing	Frank Pollard	16 CAR, 99 YDS, 2 TDs
PIT	Receiving	Louis Lipps	5 REC,. 86 YDS, 1 TD
DEN	Passing	John Elway	19/37, 184 YDS, 2 TDs, 2 INTs
DEN	Rushing	Sammy Winder	15 CAR, 37 YDS
DEN	Receiving	Gerald Willhite	4 REC, 32 YDS

Scoring summary

Quarter	Time	Drive			Team	Scoring information	Score	
Quarter	Time	Plays	Yards	TOP	Team	Scoring information	PIT	DEN
1	6:30	5	22	2:25	Broncos	Wright 9-yard touchdown reception from Elway, Karlis kick good	0	7
2	14:56	12	62	6:16	Steelers	28-yard field goal by Anderson	3	7
2	1:14	8	78	1:56	Steelers	Pollard 1-yard touchdown run, Anderson kick good	10	7
3	12:50	4	0	1:47	Broncos	21-yard field goal by Karlis	10	7
3	7:15	6	46	3:01	Broncos	Watson 20-yard touchdown reception from Elway, Karlis kick good	10	17
3	3:19	7	66	3:46	Steelers	Lipps 10-yard touchdown reception from Malone, Anderson kick good	17	17
4	1:59	3	2	1:36	Steelers	Pollard 2-yard touchdown run, Anderson kick good	24	17
"TOP" = time of possession. For other American football terms, see Glossary of American football.							24	17

- Point spread:
- Over/under:
- Time of game: 3 hours, 11 minutes

Steelers	Game statistics	Broncos
25	First downs	15
40–169	Rushes–yards	22–51
224	Passing yards	236
17–28–0	Passes	20–38–2
2–12	Sacked–yards	4–37
212	Net passing yards	199
381	Total yards	250
145	Return yards	73
2–42.5	Punts	4–42.2
3–2	Fumbles–lost	2–0
4–30	Penalties–yards	1–5
32:52	Time of possession	27:08

Individual stats

The Broncos lost to the Steelers 24–17 at Denver's Mile High Stadium on Sunday, December 30, 1984. The game was televised on NBC. Given Denver's record and their opportunistic defense (they ranked bottom 5 in total defense and 2nd in points allowed), Pittsburgh was the decided underdog. Indeed, much talk before the game centered on a possible meeting of two up-and-coming quarterbacks—Denver's John Elway and Miami's Dan Marino—in the AFC Championship Game.

The game turned into a defensive struggle. After the Broncos' first drive ended in a punt, Steelers' quarterback Mark Malone fumbled on two consecutive drives; the first ended in a missed Rich Karlis field goal, but the second was converted into a touchdown pass from Elway to receiver Jim Wright. The Steelers then answered with a scoring drive, as Gary Anderson kicked a 28-yard field goal.

With the teams trading punts, a miscue by the Steelers threatened to blow the game open. Midway through the second quarter, Steelers' punter Craig Colquitt had his punt blocked—the first of his career—and Denver set up at Pittsburgh's four-yard-line. But on third-and-goal, Elway floated a weak pass into the arms of nose tackle Gary Dunn. Now with the momentum, the Steelers were able to put a drive together at the end of the first half, resulting in a one-yard Frank Pollard touchdown run. The Broncos tried to tie the game with time running out in the half, but a long field goal attempt by Karlis fell short.

Leading somewhat surprisingly 10–7, Pittsburgh looked to grind out yards on the ground and keep Elway on the sidelines. But Denver managed two drives to take the lead in the quarter; the first ended with a Karlis chip-shot to tie the game at 10, then Elway hit receiver Steve Watson for a 20-yard strike to take a 17–10 lead. The Steelers then came back with a drive of their own, resulting in a 10-yard touchdown pass from Malone to receiver Louis Lipps. After both defenses held and forced a couple of more punts, Pittsburgh used Pollard and Walter Abercrombie to knife through a tiring Broncos defense. A key pass to Weegie Thompson put the Steelers at the 15-yard-line, where they stalled. However, Anderson missed his second field goal of the afternoon, and Denver took over with about three minutes left.

Having sustained a groin pull and a twisted knee, however, Elway was not as mobile and was experiencing difficulty with his throws. On second down, Elway threw a pass over the middle that was intercepted by Steelers' safety Eric Williams, who then ran the ball down to the 2-yard-line. After a short run and an incomplete pass, Pollard scored the go-ahead touchdown with a 1-yard run.

With a hobbled Elway not being able to lead the team to a first down, the Broncos turned the ball over on downs. They then used all their time-outs while stopping the Steelers, who, somewhat controversially, attempted a field goal on fourth down—only to see Anderson miss his third attempt of the day. Elway then threw to Watson near midfield, but by the time Elway fired the ball out of bounds to stop the clock, only one second remained. A desperation "Hail Mary" pass fell incomplete, and the Steelers won, 24–17.

The Broncos and their fans were bitterly disappointed by the loss, and finished the year 13–4. After a season-long, high-profile rivalry with their AFC West stablemates Seattle, neither team would end up in the AFC Championship Game.
