= 1985 Denver Broncos season =

American football team season

- Owner: Pat Bowlen
- General manager: John Beake
- Head coach: Dan Reeves
- Home stadium: Mile High Stadium

Results
- Record: 11–5
- Division place: 2nd AFC West
- Playoffs: Did not qualify

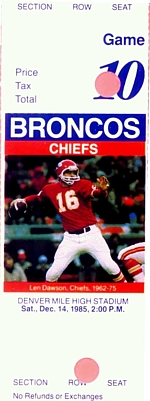
A ticket for a December 1985 game between the Broncos and the Kansas City Chiefs.

The 1985 Denver Broncos season was the team's 26th year in professional football and its 16th with the National Football League (NFL). Despite finishing with eleven wins and five losses, the Broncos failed to make the playoffs. The Broncos were coming off a loss to the Steelers in the divisional round, and were picked by many to make the Super Bowl at the end of the 1985 season. The Broncos started out well, as they started 6–2 and 8–3. However, two losses in overtime to arch rival Los Angeles resulted in the Broncos needing to win their final two games of the season to try to sneak into the playoffs. They did just that, beating Kansas City 14–13 and Seattle 27–24. However, even though the Broncos finished 11–5, they failed to reach the playoffs by virtue of a tiebreaker with the New England Patriots. The tiebreaker was based on the teams' common opponents record; and the Patriots beat the Broncos in that category by finishing 4–2 against the Raiders, Seahawks, Dolphins, and Colts, while the Broncos finished just 3–3 against the same four teams.

A week four loss at home vs. Miami and the sweep by the Raiders cost the Broncos the tiebreaker vs. the Patriots, but a 30-10 loss to the 8-8 Chargers in early November was just as damaging.

The 1985 Broncos are one of two teams in NFL history since the 1970 merger to end the season with eleven or more wins and not qualify for the playoffs - the other is the 2008 Patriots.

== Off Season ==
=== NFL draft ===
1985 Denver Broncos draft
Round	Pick	Player	Position	College	Notes
1	26	Steve Sewell	Running back	Oklahoma	
2	31	Vance Johnson	Wide receiver	Arizona	
2	54	Simon Fletcher	Defensive end	Houston	
4	110	Keli McGregor	Tight end	Colorado State	
5	139	Billy Hinson	Guard	Florida	
7	194	Dallas Cameron	Defensive tackle	Miami (FL)	
8	222	Eric Riley	Defensive back	Florida State	
9	249	Daryl Smith	Defensive back	North Alabama	
10	269	Buddy Funck	Quarterback	New Mexico	
10	278	Ron Anderson	Linebacker	Southern Methodist	
11	306	Gary Rolle	Wide receiver	Florida	
12	334	Dan Lynch	Guard	Washington State	
Made roster † Pro Football Hall of Fame * Made at least one Pro Bowl during career

== Personnel ==
=== Staff ===
1985 Denver Broncos staff
Front office: President and chief executive officer – Pat Bowlen; General manager – John Beake; Coordinator of college scouting – Reed Johnson; Head coaches: Vice president/head coach – Dan Reeves; Assistant head coach/defense – Joe Collier; Special assistant – Marvin Bass; Offensive coaches: Offensive coordinator/wide receivers and quarterbacks – Mike Shanahan; Running backs – Nick Nicolau; Tight ends/assistant offensive line – Doc Urich; Offensive line – Alex Gibbs	Defensive coaches: Defensive line – Stan Jones; Linebackers – Myrel Moore; Defensive backs – Charlie West; Special teams coaches: Special teams/defensive assistant – Chan Gailey; Strength and conditioning: Strength/conditioning – Al Miller

=== Roster ===
1985 Denver Broncos roster
Quarterbacks (QB): 7 John Elway; 8 Gary Kubiak; Running backs (RB): 34 Nathan Poole; 30 Steve Sewell; 47 Gerald Willhite; 23 Sammy Winder; Wide receivers (WR): 86 Butch Johnson; 82 Vance Johnson; 84 Clint Sampson; 81 Steve Watson; Tight ends (TE): 85 Mike Barber; 88 Clarence Kay; 87 James Wright	Offensive linemen (OL): 54 Keith Bishop G; 64 Billy Bryan C; 63 Mark Cooper T; 78 Winford Hood G; 60 Paul Howard G; 76 Ken Lanier T; 67 Dean Miraldi G/T; 70 Dave Studdard T; Defensive linemen (DL): 68 Rubin Carter NT; 79 Barney Chavous DE; 73 Simon Fletcher DE; 75 Rulon Jones DE; 71 Greg Kragen NT; 61 Andre Townsend DE	Linebackers (LB): 58 Steve Busick ILB; 59 Darren Comeaux ILB; 55 Rick Dennison ILB; 98 Ricky Hunley ILB; 57 Tom Jackson OLB; 77 Karl Mecklenburg ILB; 50 Jim Ryan OLB; 52 Ken Woodard OLB; Defensive backs (DB): 43 Steve Foley FS; 31 Mike Harden CB; 25 Daniel Hunter CB; 22 Tony Lilly FS; 48 Randy Robbins SS; 49 Dennis Smith SS; 45 Steve Wilson CB; 20 Louis Wright CB; Special teams (ST): 3 Rich Karlis K; 1 Chris Norman P	Reserve: 62 Mike Freeman C (IR); 72 Marsharne Graves T (IR); -- Alfondia Hill WR (IR); 51 Billy Hinson G (IR); 33 Gene Lang RB (IR); 21 Eric Riley CB (IR); 83 John Sawyer TE (IR); 56 Aaron Smith LB (IR); 10 Larry Ray Willis WR (IR); Rookies in italics

== Regular season ==
=== Schedule ===
Week	Date	Opponent	Result	Record	Venue	Attendance
1	September 8	at Los Angeles Rams	**L** 16–20	0–1	Anaheim Stadium	52,522
2	September 15	New Orleans Saints	**W** 34–23	1–1	Mile High Stadium	74,488
3	September 22	at Atlanta Falcons	**W** 44–28	2–1	Atlanta–Fulton County Stadium	37,903
4	September 29	Miami Dolphins	**L** 26–30	2–2	Mile High Stadium	73,614
5	October 6	Houston Oilers	**W** 31–20	3–2	Mile High Stadium	74,699
6	October 13	at Indianapolis Colts	**W** 15–10	4–2	Hoosier Dome	60,128
7	October 20	**Seattle Seahawks**	**W** 13–10 (OT)	5–2	Mile High Stadium	74,899
8	October 27	at **Kansas City Chiefs**	**W** 30–10	6–2	Arrowhead Stadium	68,246
9	November 3	at **San Diego Chargers**	**L** 10–30	6–3	Jack Murphy Stadium	57,312
10	November 11	San Francisco 49ers	**W** 17–16	7–3	Mile High Stadium	73,173
11	November 17	**San Diego Chargers**	**W** 30–24 (OT)	8–3	Mile High Stadium	74,376
12	November 24	at **Los Angeles Raiders**	**L** 28–31 (OT)	8–4	Los Angeles Memorial Coliseum	63,181
13	December 1	at Pittsburgh Steelers	**W** 31–23	9–4	Three Rivers Stadium	56,797
14	December 8	**Los Angeles Raiders**	**L** 14–17 (OT)	9–5	Mile High Stadium	75,042
15	December 14	**Kansas City Chiefs**	**W** 14–13	10–5	Mile High Stadium	69,209
16	December 20	at **Seattle Seahawks**	**W** 27–24	11–5	Kingdome	56,283
Note: Intra-division opponents are in **bold** text.

=== Season summary ===
==== Week 11 ====
Team	1	2	3	4	OT	Total
Chargers	7	7	0	10	0	24
• Broncos	7	0	0	17	6	30

- Date: November 17
- Location: Mile High Stadium
- Referee: Fred Silva
- Television network: NBC

Scoring summary
Q1	14:43	SD	Anderson 98 yard kickoff return (Thomas kick)	SD 7–0
Q1	3:10	DEN	Watson 4 yard pass from Elway (Karlis kick)	Tie 7–7
Q2	13:36	SD	James 6 yard pass from Fouts (Thomas kick)	SD 14–7
Q4	14:07	DEN	Lang 2 yard run (Karlis kick)	Tie 14–14
Q4	13:45	DEN	Lang 4 yard run (Karlis kick)	DEN 21–14
Q4	10:09	SD	Thomas 36 yard field goal	DEN 21–17
Q4	1:18	SD	Spencer 2 yard run (Thomas kick)	SD 24–21
Q4	0:05	DEN	Karlis 34 yard field goal	Tie 24–24
OT	10:15	DEN	Wright 60 yard blocked field goal return	DEN 30–24

==== Week 14 vs Raiders ====
Week 14: Los Angeles Raiders (9–4) at Denver Broncos (9–4)

Quarter	1	2	3	4	OT	Total
**Raiders**	0	0	14	0	3	**17**
Broncos	7	7	0	0	0	**14**

at Mile High Stadium, Denver, Colorado

- Date: December 8
- Game time: 4:00 p.m. EST
- Game weather: 31 °F (−1 °C)
- Game attendance: 75,042
- Referee: Fred Wyant
- TV announcers (NBC): Dick Enberg and Merlin Olsen
- Box Score, Box Score

Game information

**First quarter**

- DEN – James Wright 5-yard pass from John Elway (Rich Karlis kick), 1:27. Broncos 7–0. Drive:

**Second quarter**

- DEN – Sammy Winder 1-yard run (Rich Karlis kick), 0:30. Broncos 14–0. Drive:

**Third quarter**

- LA – Todd Christensen 3-yard pass from Marc Wilson (Chris Bahr kick), 8:31. Broncos 14–7. Drive:
- LA – Marcus Allen 15–yard run (Chris Bahr kick), 4:45. Tie 14–14. Drive:

**Fourth quarter**

- No scoring

**Overtime**

- LA – Chris Bahr 26-yard field goal, 10:05. Raiders 17–14. Drive:

Top passers

- LA – Marc Wilson – 13/28, 93 yards, TD, 4 INT
- DEN – John Elway – 18/36, 158 yards, TD, 3 INT

Top rushers

- LA – Marcus Allen – 25 rushes, 135 yards, TD
- DEN – Sammy Winder – 14 rushes, 41 yards, TD

Top receivers

- LA – Todd Christensen – 6 receptions, 53 yards, TD
- DEN – Steve Watson – 5 receptions, 56 yards

== Standings ==
AFC West
	W	L	T	PCT	DIV	CONF	PF	PA	STK
^{(1)} Los Angeles Raiders	12	4	0	.750	5–3	9–3	354	308	W6
Denver Broncos	11	5	0	.688	5–3	8–4	380	329	W2
Seattle Seahawks	8	8	0	.500	4–4	6–6	349	303	L2
San Diego Chargers	8	8	0	.500	3–5	7–7	467	435	L1
Kansas City Chiefs	6	10	0	.375	3–5	4–8	317	360	W1
