= 1987–88 NFL playoffs =

American football tournament

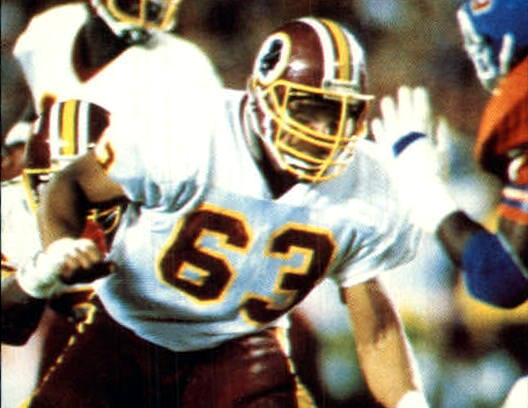
- Redskins guard Raleigh McKenzie covering an opponent during Super Bowl XXII.
- Dates: January 3–31, 1988
- Season: 1987
- Teams: 10
- Games played: 9
- Super Bowl XXII site: Jack Murphy Stadium; San Diego, California
- Defending champions: New York Giants (did not qualify)
- Champion: Washington Redskins (4th title)
- Runner-up: Denver Broncos
- Conference runners-up: Cleveland Browns; Minnesota Vikings
NFL playoffs
← 1986–87	1988–89 →

The National Football League playoffs for the 1987 season began on January 3, 1988. The postseason tournament concluded with the Washington Redskins defeating the Denver Broncos in Super Bowl XXII, 42–10, on January 31, at Jack Murphy Stadium in San Diego, California.

== Participants ==
Within each conference, the three division winners and the two non-division winners with the best overall regular season records qualified for the playoffs. The NFL did not use a fixed-bracket playoff system. The three division winners were seeded 1–3 based on their overall won-lost-tied record, and received a first-round bye while the wild card teams were seeded 4 and 5, and played in the first round, dubbed the wild-card playoffs or wild-card weekend, with the 4 seed hosting. The second round, the divisional playoffs, had a restriction where two teams from the same division could not meet: the surviving wild card team visited the division champion outside its division that had the higher seed, and the remaining two teams from that conference played each other. The two surviving teams from each conference's divisional playoff games then met in the respective AFC and NFC Conference Championship games, hosted by the higher seed. Finally the Super Bowl, the championship round of the playoffs, was played at a neutral site, with the designated home team based on an annual rotation by conference.

Playoff seeds
Seed	AFC	NFC
1	Denver Broncos (West winner)	San Francisco 49ers (West winner)
2	Cleveland Browns (Central winner)	Chicago Bears (Central winner)
3	Indianapolis Colts (East winner)	Washington Redskins (East winner)
4	Houston Oilers (wild card)	New Orleans Saints (wild card)
5	Seattle Seahawks (wild card)	Minnesota Vikings (wild card)

== Bracket ==
Jan 9 – Candlestick Park
5	Minnesota	36
Jan 3 – Louisiana Superdome	Jan 17 – RFK Stadium
1	San Francisco	24
NFC
5	Minnesota	44	5	Minnesota	10
Jan 10 – Soldier Field
4	New Orleans	10	3	Washington	17
NFC Championship
3	Washington	21
Jan 31 – Jack Murphy Stadium
2	Chicago	17
Divisional round
Wild-card round	N3	Washington	42
Jan 9 – Cleveland Stadium
A1	Denver	10
Super Bowl XXII
3	Indianapolis	21
Jan 3 – Astrodome	Jan 17 – Mile High Stadium
2	Cleveland	38
AFC
5	Seattle	20	2	Cleveland	33
Jan 10 – Mile High Stadium
4	Houston	23*	1	Denver	38
AFC Championship
4	Houston	10
1	Denver	34

* Indicates overtime victory

== Schedule ==
In the United States, NBC broadcast the AFC playoff games, CBS televised the NFC games, and ABC covered Super Bowl XXII.

Round	Away team	Score	Home team	Date	Kickoff (ET / UTC−5)	TV
Wild-card round	Minnesota Vikings	44–10	New Orleans Saints	January 3, 1988	12:30 p.m.	CBS
Wild-card round	Seattle Seahawks	20–23 (OT)	Houston Oilers	January 3, 1988	4:00 p.m.	NBC
Divisional round	Indianapolis Colts	21–38	Cleveland Browns	January 9, 1988	12:30 p.m.	NBC
Divisional round	Minnesota Vikings	36–24	San Francisco 49ers	January 9, 1988	4:00 p.m.	CBS
Divisional round	Washington Redskins	21–17	Chicago Bears	January 10, 1988	12:30 p.m.	CBS
Divisional round	Houston Oilers	10–34	Denver Broncos	January 10, 1988	4:00 p.m.	NBC
Conference championships	Minnesota Vikings	10–17	Washington Redskins	January 17, 1988	12:30 p.m.	CBS
Conference championships	Cleveland Browns	33–38	Denver Broncos	January 17, 1988	4:00 p.m.	NBC
Super Bowl XXII Jack Murphy Stadium San Diego, California	Washington Redskins	42–10	Denver Broncos	January 31, 1988	6:00 p.m.	ABC

== Wild-card round ==
=== Sunday, January 3, 1988 ===
==== NFC: Minnesota Vikings 44, New Orleans Saints 10 ====
Minnesota Vikings vs. New Orleans Saints – Game summary

Quarter	1	2	3	4	Total
Vikings	10	21	3	10	44
Saints	7	3	0	0	10

at Louisiana Superdome, New Orleans, Louisiana

- Game time: 12:30 p.m. EST/11:30 a.m. CST
- Game attendance: 68,546
- Referee: Tom Dooley
- TV announcers (CBS): Pat Summerall (play-by-play) and John Madden (color commentator)
- Pro-Football-Reference

Game information

First quarter

- NO – Eric Martin 10-yard pass from Bobby Hebert (Morten Andersen kick). Saints 7–0.
- MIN – Chuck Nelson 42-yard field goal. Saints 7–3.
- MIN – Anthony Carter 84-yard punt return (Chuck Nelson kick). Vikings 10–7.

Second quarter

- MIN – Steve Jordan 5-yard pass from Wade Wilson (Chuck Nelson kick). Vikings 17–7.
- MIN – Anthony Carter 10-yard pass from Allen Rice (Chuck Nelson kick). Vikings 24–7.
- NO – Morten Andersen 40-yard field goal. Vikings 24–10.
- MIN – Hassan Jones 44-yard pass from Wade Wilson (Chuck Nelson kick). Vikings 31–10.

Third quarter

- MIN – Chuck Nelson 42-yard field goal. Vikings 34–10.

Fourth quarter

- MIN – Chuck Nelson 19-yard field goal. Vikings 37–10.
- MIN – D. J. Dozier 18-yard run (Chuck Nelson kick). Vikings 44–10.

Top passers

- MIN – Wade Wilson – 11/20, 189 yards, 2 TD
- NO – Bobby Hebert – 9/19, 84 yards, TD, 2 INT

Top rushers

- MIN – Darrin Nelson – 17 rushes, 73 yards
- NO – Dalton Hilliard – 8 rushes, 39 yards

Top receivers

- MIN – Anthony Carter – 6 receptions, 79 yards, TD
- NO – Hoby Brenner – 2 receptions, 33 yards

In the Saints' first playoff game (and first winning season) in history, the Vikings dominated the game by recording two sacks, forcing six turnovers, and allowing only 149 yards. It was a stunning victory for the underdog Vikings, who had barely made the playoffs with an 8–7 record after losing three of their last four games, including their season ending match at home against the Washington Redskins in which they blew a 10-point fourth quarter lead, costing them a chance to clinch a playoff slot. The Vikings would spend the rest of the day pondering their prospects until a Dallas win over St. Louis enabled them to snag the NFC's lowest postseason seed. The Vikings had also been plagued with quarterback problems all year, starting three different quarterbacks during the season. Wade Wilson had the most starts with 7, but coach Jerry Burns decided to start Tommy Kramer, who had been through so many injuries he had only started in 5 regular season games and had not finished any of them. Meanwhile, the Saints had the NFL's second best record at 12-3 and came into this game on a 9-game winning streak.

New Orleans scored first after Vikings quarterback Kramer's fumble on a bad snap led to Saints quarterback Bobby Hebert's 10-yard touchdown pass to wide receiver Eric Martin. Then, Kramer was sacked and the Vikings had to punt, but Saints returner Mel Gray accidentally hit the ball while trying to avoid it and the Vikings recovered on the New Orleans 27, leading to Chuck Nelson's 42-yard field goal. Kramer had to leave the game on the next drive with a pinched nerve in his neck, but the team would go on to win easily without him. Later in the quarter, they went up 10-7 when Anthony Carter returned a Saints punt for an 84-yard touchdown, setting a playoff record for the longest punt return TD.

In the second quarter, Vikings running back Darrin Nelson caught a screen pass from Wilson on 3rd and 10, and took off for a 37-yard gain to the Saints 1-yard line, setting up Wilson's 5-yard touchdown pass to tight end Steve Jordan. Then on Minnesota's next drive, running back Allen Rice threw a 10-yard touchdown to Carter on a halfback option play. Saints kicker Morten Andersen cut the score to 24–10 with a 40-yard field goal, but John Harris' interception of a Hebert pass on the Saints 35 led to Wilson's 44-yard touchdown completion on a "Hail Mary" pass to Hassan Jones on the last play of the first half. Time had expired on the previous play, but the Saints were penalized for having 12 men on the field, giving the Vikings one more play with no time left on the clock.

The Vikings went on dominating the second half, scoring two more Nelson field goals and an 8-yard touchdown run by D. J. Dozier. In the second half alone, the Vikings gained 179 yards rushing.

Carter, who had only returned three punts during the season, finished the game with six punt returns for a playoff record 143 yards, and also caught six passes for 79 yards and another score. Wilson finished the game completing 11 of 20 passes for 189 yards and two touchdowns.

This was the first postseason meeting between the Vikings and Saints.

==== AFC: Houston Oilers 23, Seattle Seahawks 20 (OT) ====
Seattle Seahawks vs. Houston Oilers – Game summary

Quarter	1	2	3	4	OT	Total
Seahawks	7	3	3	7	0	20
Oilers	3	10	7	0	3	23

at Astrodome, Houston, Texas

- Game time: 4:00 p.m. EST/3:00 p.m. CST
- Game attendance: 50,519
- Referee: Bob McElwee
- TV announcers (NBC): Marv Albert (play-by-play) and Joe Namath (color commentator)

Game information

First quarter

- SEA – Steve Largent 20-yard pass from Dave Krieg (Norm Johnson kick). Seahawks 7–0.
- HOU – Tony Zendejas 47-yard field goal. Seahawks 7–3.

Second quarter

- HOU – Mike Rozier 1-yard run (Tony Zendejas kick). Oilers 10–7.
- HOU – Tony Zendejas 49-yard field goal. Oilers 13–7.
- SEA – Norm Johnson 33-yard field goal. Oilers 13–10.

Third quarter

- SEA – Norm Johnson 41-yard field goal. Tied 13–13.
- HOU – Willie Drewrey 29-yard pass from Warren Moon (Tony Zendejas kick). Oilers 20–13.

Fourth quarter

- SEA – Steve Largent 12-yard pass from Dave Krieg (Norm Johnson kick). Tied 20–20.

Overtime

- HOU – Tony Zendejas 42-yard field goal. Oilers 23–20.

Top passers

- SEA – Dave Krieg – 16/38, 237 yards, 2 TD
- HOU – Warren Moon – 21/32, 273 yards, TD, INT

Top rushers

- SEA – John L. Williams – 7 rushes, 27 yards
- HOU – Alonzo Highsmith – 12 rushes, 74 yards

Top receivers

- SEA – Steve Largent – 7 receptions, 132 yards, 2 TD
- HOU – Ernest Givins – 7 receptions, 89 yards

Oilers kicker Tony Zendejas won the game with a 42-yard field goal 8:05 into overtime. Although Houston outgained Seattle with 427 total offensive yards to 250, and Seattle was playing without star running back Curt Warner due to injury, the game remained close until the very end.

On the opening drive of the game, Seattle cornerback Melvin Jenkins intercepted Warren Moon's pass and returned it 28 yards to the Houston 46. Seahawks quarterback Dave Krieg then hit Steve Largent for a 33-yard completion, and eventually found him in the end zone for a 20-yard touchdown pass. This would be the extent of Seattle's first half success, as they gained just three yards with their next four possessions. Meanwhile, the Oilers responded with 13 unanswered points with two field goals by Zendejas (from 47 and 49 yards) and running back Mike Rozier's 1-yard rushing touchdown.

In the third quarter, Seattle running back Bobby Joe Edmonds returned a punt 54 yards to set up Norm Johnson's 33-yard field goal. Then a short Houston punt enabled Seattle to tie the game at 13 with Johnson's 41-yard kick at the end of the drive that went just 16 yards. Later in the third quarter, Moon threw a 29-yard touchdown pass to Willie Drewrey to give his team a 20–13 lead. Houston later had two chances to put the game away in the fourth quarter, but Zendejas hit the uprights on a 52-yard field goal, and later missed a kick from 29 yards out. With only 1:47 left in regulation, Krieg started an 80-yard drive that included a 10-yard completion to Largent on fourth and 10. Krieg then picked up 26 yards on another completion to Largent, and followed it up with a 32-yard pass to Ray Butler on the Houston 12. On the next play, he finished it with a 12-yard touchdown pass to Largent, tying the game with 26 seconds left.

Seattle won the coin toss in overtime, but had to punt. On Houston's ensuing drive, Fredd Young appeared to intercept a deflected pass; one official ruled a catch, but he was overruled and the call was not overturned by replay review, allowing Houston to keep the ball and drive to Zendejas' game winning score.

After the game, replay official Tony Veteri explained the call on Young's potential interception: "We could not tell whether the ball hit or not so we had to go with the call on the field. We did not get a clear-cut view of whether {Young} caught the ball before it hit the ground. Part of his arm covered up the ball. So we had to go with the call on the field." However, Young was livid: "It was as clean as you can catch a ball," he said. "There was no possible way that ball hit the ground. I know I had it."

Largent finished the game with seven receptions for 132 yards and two touchdowns, accounting for more than half his team's offense. Edmonds returned five kickoffs for 109 yards and three punts for 66. Moon completed 21 of 32 passes for 273 yards, a touchdown, and an interception. It was Houston's first playoff win since 1979, added on to their first winning season since 1980.

This was the first postseason meeting between the Seahawks and Oilers.

== Divisional round ==
=== Saturday, January 9, 1988 ===
==== AFC: Cleveland Browns 38, Indianapolis Colts 21 ====
Indianapolis Colts vs. Cleveland Browns – Game summary

Quarter	1	2	3	4	Total
Colts	7	7	0	7	21
Browns	7	7	7	17	38

at Cleveland Stadium, Cleveland, Ohio

- Game time: 12:30 p.m. EST
- Game attendance: 79,372
- Referee: Red Cashion
- TV announcers (NBC): Don Criqui (play-by-play) and Bob Trumpy (color commentator)

Game information

First quarter

- CLE – Earnest Byner 10-yard pass from Bernie Kosar (Matt Bahr kick). Browns 7–0.
- IND – Pat Beach 2-yard pass from Jack Trudeau (Dean Biasucci kick). Tied 7–7.

Second quarter

- CLE – Reggie Langhorne 39-yard pass from Bernie Kosar (Matt Bahr kick). Browns 14–7.
- IND – Eric Dickerson 19-yard pass from Jack Trudeau (Dean Biasucci kick). Tied 14–14.

Third quarter

- CLE – Earnest Byner 2-yard run (Matt Bahr kick). Browns 21–14.

Fourth quarter

- CLE – Matt Bahr 22-yard field goal. Browns 24–14.
- CLE – Brian Brennan 2-yard pass from Bernie Kosar (Matt Bahr kick). Browns 31–14.
- IND – Albert Bentley 1-yard run (Dean Biasucci kick). Browns 31–21.
- CLE – Frank Minnifield 48-yard interception return (Matt Bahr kick). Browns 38–21.

Top passers

- IND – Jack Trudeau – 21/33, 251 yards, 2 TD, INT
- CLE – Bernie Kosar – 20/31, 229 yards, 3 TD, INT

Top rushers

- IND – Eric Dickerson – 15 rushes, 50 yards
- CLE – Earnest Byner – 23 rushes, 122 yards, TD

Top receivers

- IND – Bill Brooks – 5 receptions, 78 yards
- CLE – Ozzie Newsome – 4 receptions, 65 yards

Felix Wright's interception deep inside his own territory sparked his team to score 17 unanswered points.

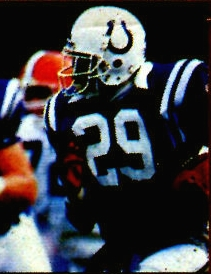
The Colts newly acquired running back Eric Dickerson rushed for 50 yards and received for 65 yards in the game, but it was not enough to stop the Browns.

Cleveland started off the game with a 15-play, 86-yard drive, converting five third downs on the way to Bernie Kosar's 15-yard touchdown pass to Earnest Byner. The Colts stormed right back, as quarterback Jack Trudeau threw completions for gains of 18 and 21 yards before finishing the drive with a 2-yard touchdown pass to tight end Pat Beach. Cleveland responded by driving from their own 35 to the Indianapolis 2-yard line, but on third down and goal, Colts safety Freddie Robinson intercepted Kosar's pass in the end zone. After an exchange of punts, the Browns took a 14–7 lead on Kosar's 39-yard touchdown pass to Reggie Langhorne with 1:51 left in the second quarter. Once again, the Colts responded with a touchdown of their own, moving the ball 59 yards in seven plays and tying the score on Trudeau's 19-yard touchdown pass to Eric Dickerson with 40 seconds left in the half.

Indianapolis took the second half kickoff and stormed down the field, overcoming some blown plays along the way. During the drive, Trudeau was sacked for an 11-yard loss on second down and 11, but a defensive holding penalty negated the play and gave the Colts a first down. Later on, Dickerson fumbled the ball, but Trudeau picked it up and threw a 15-yard first down completion to Bill Brooks. Eventually, Indianapolis reached the Browns 20-yard line, but linebacker Eddie Johnson hit Trudeau as he threw a pass, causing the ball to go straight up in the air where it was intercepted by Wright at the 14.

After the interception, Kosar completed five of seven passes for 65 yards while Byner rushed six times for 20 and capped off the drive with a 2-yard touchdown run, putting the Browns back in the lead, 21–14. Then after forcing a punt, Matt Bahr's 22-yard field goal gave the Browns a 10-point lead with just over 11 minutes left in the game. Following another punt, Byner fumbled the ball on a 25-yard run, but running back Herman Fontenot recovered the ball at the Colts 6-yard line, turning the play into a 41-yard gain. Three plays later, Kosar's 2-yard touchdown pass to receiver Brian Brennan made the score 31–14 with 3:44 left.

However, the Colts were not quite out of the game. With 1:07 left in regulation, Albert Bentley's 1-yard touchdown run cut the score to 31–21. Then Indianapolis recovered an onside kick on their own 41-yard line. But on the first play after that, Browns defensive end Al Baker sacked Trudeau for a 9-yard loss, knocking him out of the game. One play later, backup quarterback Sean Salisbury's pass was intercepted by Frank Minnifield, who returned the ball 48 yards for a touchdown to put the game away.

Byner finished the game with 122 rushing yards, four receptions for 36 yards, and two touchdowns. Kosar completed 20 of 31 passes for 229 yards, three touchdowns, and an interception.

This was the fourth postseason meeting between the Colts and Browns. The Colts won two of the prior three meetings when they were based in Baltimore.

Previous playoff games
Indianapolis/ Baltimore leads 2–1 in all-time playoff games

1964

Baltimore Colts 0 @ Cleveland Browns 27

1964 NFL Championship Game

1968

Baltimore Colts 34 @ Cleveland Browns 0

1968 NFL Championship Game

1971

Baltimore Colts 20 @ Cleveland Browns 3

1971 AFC Divisional playoffs

==== NFC: Minnesota Vikings 36, San Francisco 49ers 24 ====
Minnesota Vikings vs. San Francisco 49ers – Game summary

Quarter	1	2	3	4	Total
Vikings	3	17	10	6	36
49ers	3	0	14	7	24

at Candlestick Park, San Francisco, California

- Game time: 4:00 p.m. EST/1:00 p.m. PST
- Game attendance: 63,008
- Referee: Gene Barth
- TV announcers (CBS): Tim Ryan (play-by-play) and Joe Theismann (color commentator)
- Pro-Football-Reference

Game information

First quarter

- MIN – Chuck Nelson 21-yard field goal. Vikings 3–0.
- SF – Ray Wersching 43-yard field goal. Tied 3–3.

Second quarter

- MIN – Carl Hilton 7-yard pass from Wade Wilson (Chuck Nelson kick). Vikings 10–3.
- MIN – Chuck Nelson 23-yard field goal. Vikings 13–3.
- MIN – Najee Mustafaa 45-yard interception return (Chuck Nelson kick). Vikings 20–3.

Third quarter

- SF – Jeff Fuller 48-yard interception return (Ray Wersching kick). Vikings 20–10.
- MIN – Hassan Jones 5-yard pass from Wade Wilson (Chuck Nelson kick). Vikings 27–10.
- SF – Steve Young 5-yard run (Ray Wersching kick). Vikings 27–17.
- MIN – Chuck Nelson 40-yard field goal. Vikings 30–17.

Fourth quarter

- MIN – Chuck Nelson 40-yard field goal. Vikings 33–17.
- SF – John Frank 16-yard pass from Steve Young (Ray Wersching kick). Vikings 33–24.
- MIN – Chuck Nelson 23-yard field goal. Vikings 36–24.

Top passers

- MIN – Wade Wilson – 20/34, 298 yards, 2 TD, INT
- SF – Steve Young – 12/17, 158 yards, TD, INT

Top rushers

- MIN – Darrin Nelson – 11 rushes, 42 yards
- SF – Steve Young – 6 rushes, 72 yards, TD

Top receivers

- MIN – Anthony Carter – 10 receptions, 227 yards
- SF – Roger Craig – 9 receptions, 78 yards

Aided by wide receiver Anthony Carter's 10 receptions for an NFL playoff record 227 receiving yards, the Vikings upset the top seeded 49ers, who had earned the league's best record during the regular season at 13–2.

Minnesota drove 77 yards on their opening drive, including an 11-yard run by quarterback Wade Wilson out of shotgun formation on third and 7, to score on Chuck Nelson's 21-yard field goal. Then after an exchange of punts, 49ers quarterback Joe Montana's completions to Roger Craig and John Taylor for gains of 18 and 33 yards helped advance the ball 74 yards in 10 plays to tie the game on a 34-yard field goal from Ray Wersching.

Minnesota broke the tie in the second quarter with 17 unanswered points. First Wilson completed two passes to Carter for 23 total yards and rushed for 12 on a 70-yard drive that he finished with a 7-yard touchdown pass to tight end Carl Hilton. Following a 49ers punt, Wilson's 63-yard completion to Carter set up a second Nelson field goal, increasing the Vikings lead to 13–3. Then safety Reggie Rutland intercepted a pass from Montana intended for Dwight Clark and returned it 45 yards for a touchdown. The 49ers had a chance to cut into the lead before halftime, but Wersching missed a 26-yard field goal attempt, and the score would remain 20–3.

49ers safety Jeff Fuller returned an interception 48 yards for a touchdown early in the third quarter, but the Vikings stormed right back, with Carter gaining 30 yards on an end around play as the team drove 68 yards to score on Wilson's short touchdown pass to Hassan Jones, making the score 27–10. Later on, San Francisco coach Bill Walsh had enough of Montana and replaced him with Steve Young. The decision appeared to pay off, as Young hooked up with Craig for a 31-yard completion and later took the ball into the end zone himself on a 5-yard run, cutting their deficit to 27–17. But Minnesota countered with Wilson's 40-yard completion to Carter that set up Nelson's third field goal of the day. Wersching missed a 48-yard field goal on San Francisco's next drive, and the team would go into the final quarter still trailing 30–17.

In the fourth quarter, Fuller was nailed with a 15-yard facemask penalty while tackling Vikings running back Allen Rice after he gained 19 yards on a screen pass, setting up Nelson's 46-yard field goal to put the Vikings up 33–17. Then Carl Lee intercepted a pass from Young, allowing Minnesota to run more time off the clock. Following a punt, Young led the 49ers 68 yards in eight plays to score on a 16-yard touchdown pass to tight end John Frank, but by then there was only 3:42 left in the game. Nelson later kicked a postseason record fifth field goal, this one from 23 yards, to completely dash any hope of a miracle comeback.

In addition to his 227 receiving yards, Carter had a 30-yard carry and returned two punts for 21 yards. Vikings outside linebacker Chris Doleman had two sacks. Wilson completed 20/34 passes for 298 yards and two touchdowns, with one interception. Nelson finished the day a perfect 5/5 on field goals, a notable contrast to his lowly 13/24 performance during the regular season. Montana was held to just 12/26 completions for 109 yards with one interception. Young had a solid performance with 12/17 completions for 158 yards and a touchdown, with one interception, while also leading San Francisco in rushing with 72 yards on six carries. It was a sign of what lay in store for 49ers fans, as they would watch him and Montana compete fiercely for the starting quarterback job until Young inherited the starting position when Joe Montana suffered a serious elbow injury during the 1991 preseason. Until the 2007–08 NFL playoffs with the Cowboys losing to the Giants, this was the last time the No. 1 seed in the NFC did not advance to the NFC Championship Game. After the Cowboys loss, three of the next four No. 1 seeds in the NFC would lose their first playoff game (2008 Giants, 2010 Falcons and 2011 Packers).

This was the second postseason meeting between the Vikings and 49ers. San Francisco won the only previous meeting.

Previous playoff games
San Francisco leads 1–0 in all-time playoff games

1970

San Francisco 49ers 17 @ Minnesota Vikings 14

1970 NFC Divisional playoffs

=== Sunday, January 10, 1988 ===
==== NFC: Washington Redskins 21, Chicago Bears 17 ====
Washington Redskins vs. Chicago Bears – Game summary

Quarter	1	2	3	4	Total
Redskins	0	14	7	0	21
Bears	7	7	3	0	17

at Soldier Field, Chicago, Illinois

- Game time: 12:30 p.m. EST/11:30 a.m. CST
- Game attendance: 65,268
- Referee: Pat Haggerty
- TV announcers (CBS): Pat Summerall (play-by-play) and John Madden (color commentator)

Game information

First quarter

- CHI – Calvin Thomas 2-yard run (Kevin Butler kick). Bears 7–0.

Second quarter

- CHI – Ron Morris 14-yard pass from Jim McMahon (Kevin Butler kick). Bears 14–0.
- WAS – George Rogers 3-yard run (Ali Haji-Sheikh kick). Bears 14–7.
- WAS – Clint Didier 18-yard pass from Doug Williams (Ali Haji-Sheikh kick). Tied 14–14.

Third quarter

- WAS – Darrell Green 52-yard punt return (Ali Haji-Sheikh kick). Redskins 21–14.
- CHI – Kevin Butler 25-yard field goal. Redskins 21–17.

Fourth quarter

- No scoring plays.

Top passers

- WAS – Doug Williams – 14/29, 207 yards, TD, INT
- CHI – Jim McMahon – 15/29, 197 yards, TD, 3 INT

Top rushers

- WAS – Timmy Smith – 16 rushes, 66 yards
- CHI – Walter Payton – 18 rushes, 85 yards

Top receivers

- WAS – Ricky Sanders – 6 receptions, 92 yards
- CHI – Ron Morris – 2 receptions, 47 yards, TD

The Redskins overcame a 14–0 Bears lead by scoring three touchdowns. Early in the first quarter, Chicago's Richard Dent forced a fumble from Washington quarterback Doug Williams that defensive tackle Steve McMichael recovered on the Redskins 30-yard line, leading to running back Calvin Thomas' 2-yard touchdown run. Later on, Washington running back George Rogers was tackled for a 1-yard loss while trying to convert a fourth and 1 from the Chicago 32-yard line. The Bears then drove 67 yards on a drive that consumed 9:04 and ended with Jim McMahon throwing a 14-yard touchdown pass to Ron Morris.

However, Washington tied the game before halftime. First, Williams' 32-yard completion to Ricky Sanders on third down and nine and his 14-yard completion to tight end Clint Didier set up a 3-yard touchdown run by Rogers with 4:51 left in the half. Then after Chicago kicker Kevin Butler missed a 48-yard field goal, Washington got the ball back with 1:51 and made a big play when a late hit by cornerback Maurice Douglass turned a 13-yard catch by Sanders into a 28-yard gain. After two receptions by Gary Clark for 23 yards, Williams tied the game with an 18-yard touchdown pass to Didier.

With 11:40 left in the third quarter, Redskins cornerback Darrell Green scored on a 52-yard punt return for a touchdown (Green injured his ribs hurdling over a Chicago defender, #86 tight end Casper "Cap" Boso, en route to the end zone). Chicago responded with a 44-yard reception by Willie Gault that set up Butler's 25-yard field goal with 4:41 remaining in the quarter, but were shut down for the rest of the game. Green would return for just one play before leaving as a result of his injury, but Washington's defense still held on to their lead without him, intercepting three passes from McMahon in the second half.

Early in the fourth quarter, Washington drove into the Bears' red zone and sent their special teams unit to attempt a 35-yard field goal. Backup quarterback Jay Schroeder, who was the holder on the play, called an audible for a fake field goal, but due to the roaring crowd at Soldier Field, his receivers didn't hear the call. As a result, he had no one to throw to after the snap, and slipped on the 25-yard line while trying to run for a first down. Chicago then took over and drove to the Washington 14-yard line. But with just over nine minutes left in the game, McMahon's pass was intercepted by Barry Wilburn in the end zone. Later on, McMahon was intercepted again, this time by Dennis Woodberry at the Chicago 43. Three plays later, Washington attempted to put the game away with a quarterback sneak on fourth and inches, but Williams was stopped short with 1:13 left, giving the Bears one last chance to drive for a winning score. However, the Redskins defense again rose to the occasion, forcing Walter Payton out of bounds one yard short of the first-down marker on fourth down and 8.

This was the final game in the Hall of Fame career of Payton, who rushed for 85 yards and caught three passes for 20 yards. With this win, Joe Gibbs advanced to his third NFC Championship Game in his seven years as the Redskins head coach.

This game, along with the earlier win by the Vikings over the 49ers, would mark the first time the No. 1 and No. 2 seeds in a conference both lost. The feat has only been done twice more, in the AFC in the 2006–07 NFL playoffs with the Colts and Patriots beating the Ravens and Chargers, and again in the NFC in the 2008–09 NFL playoffs with the Cardinals beating the Panthers and Eagles defeating the Giants.

This was the seventh postseason meeting between the Redskins and Bears. Both teams split the previous six meetings.

Previous playoff games
Tied 3–3 in all-time playoff games

1937

Chicago Bears 21 @ Washington Redskins 28

1937 NFL Championship Game

1940

Chicago Bears 73 @ Washington Redskins 0

1940 NFL Championship Game

1942

Chicago Bears 6 @ Washington Redskins 14

1942 NFL Championship Game

1943

Washington Redskins 21 @ Chicago Bears 41

1943 NFL Championship Game

1984

Chicago Bears 23 @ Washington Redskins 19

1984 NFC Divisional playoffs

1986

Washington Redskins 27 @ Chicago Bears 13

1986 NFC Divisional playoffs

==== AFC: Denver Broncos 34, Houston Oilers 10 ====
Houston Oilers vs. Denver Broncos – Game summary

Quarter	1	2	3	4	Total
Oilers	0	3	0	7	10
Broncos	14	10	3	7	34

at Mile High Stadium, Denver, Colorado

- Game time: 4:00 p.m. EST/2:00 p.m. MST
- Game attendance: 75,440
- Referee: Jerry Markbreit
- TV announcers (NBC): Dick Enberg (play-by-play) and Merlin Olsen (color commentator)

Game information

First quarter

- DEN – Gene Lang 1-yard run (Rich Karlis kick). Broncos 7–0.
- DEN – Clarence Kay 27-yard pass from John Elway (Rich Karlis kick). Broncos 14–0.

Second quarter

- DEN – Rich Karlis 43-yard field goal. Broncos 17–0.
- HOU – Tony Zendejas 46-yard field goal. Broncos 17–3.
- DEN – Clarence Kay 1-yard pass from John Elway (Rich Karlis kick). Broncos 24–3.

Third quarter

- DEN – Rich Karlis 23-yard field goal. Broncos 27–3.

Fourth quarter

- HOU – Ernest Givins 19-yard pass from Warren Moon (Tony Zendejas kick). Broncos 27–10.
- DEN – John Elway 3-yard run (Rich Karlis kick). Broncos 34–10.

Top passers

- HOU – Warren Moon – 24/43, 264 yards, TD, 2 INT
- DEN – John Elway – 14/25, 259 yards, 2 TD, INT

Top rushers

- HOU – Mike Rozier – 9 rushes, 25 yards
- DEN – Sammy Winder – 13 rushes, 46 yards

Top receivers

- HOU – Drew Hill – 5 receptions, 93 yards
- DEN – Vance Johnson – 4 receptions, 105 yards

The Broncos jumped to an early 14–0 lead by converting two turnovers into touchdowns.

On the second play of the Oilers 1st drive, Steve Wilson recovered a fumbled lateral pass by running back Mike Rozier (the play was referred to as the "Stagger Lee" play after the 1923 folk song) at the Houston 1-yard line, setting up Gene Lang's 1-yard touchdown run. Then on the Oilers next drive, they drove 60 yards to the Denver 20, only to lose the ball when linebacker Karl Mecklenburg intercepted a pass from Warren Moon and returned it 18 yards to the Broncos 28-yard line. Denver quarterback John Elway hooked up with tight end Clarence Kay for a 29-yard completion on the next play. Five plays later, he completed a 27-yard pass to Kay for a touchdown that gave Denver a 14–0 lead. Both teams exchanged field goals in the second quarter before Elway threw a 1-yard touchdown to Kay.

In the third quarter, with Denver up 27–3, the Oilers drove to the Broncos 7-yard line, but lost the ball again with a Moon pass that Mark Haynes intercepted and returned 57 yards. In the fourth quarter, Moon completed a 19-yard touchdown to wide receiver Ernest Givins, but it was countered with Elway's 3-yard touchdown run.

Broncos receiver Vance Johnson caught four passes for 105 yards, but was injured in the game and had to miss the AFC Championship Game and saw limited action in Super Bowl XXII. Mike Harden, starting at strong safety in place of an injured Dennis Smith, was knocked out of the game himself with a broken right forearm.

This was the second postseason meeting between the Oilers and Broncos. Houston won the only previous meeting.

Previous playoff games
Houston leads 1–0 in all-time playoff games

1979

Denver Broncos 7 @ Houston Oilers 13

1979 AFC Wild Card playoffs

== Conference championships ==
=== Sunday, January 17, 1988 ===
==== NFC: Washington Redskins 17, Minnesota Vikings 10 ====
Minnesota Vikings vs. Washington Redskins – Game summary

Quarter	1	2	3	4	Total
Vikings	0	7	0	3	10
Redskins	7	0	3	7	17

at Robert F. Kennedy Memorial Stadium, Washington, D.C.

- Game time: 12:30 p.m. EST
- Game attendance: 55,212
- Referee: Ben Dreith
- TV announcers (CBS): Pat Summerall (play-by-play) and John Madden (color commentator)

Game information

First quarter

- WAS – Kelvin Bryant 42-yard pass from Doug Williams (Ali Haji-Sheikh kick). Redskins 7–0.

Second quarter

- MIN – Leo Lewis 23-yard pass from Wade Wilson (Chuck Nelson kick). Tied 7–7.

Third quarter

- WAS – Ali Haji-Sheikh 28-yard field goal. Redskins 10–7.

Fourth quarter

- MIN – Chuck Nelson 18-yard field goal. Tied 10–10.
- WAS – Gary Clark 7-yard pass from Doug Williams (Ali Haji-Sheikh kick). Redskins 17–10.

Top passers

- MIN – Wade Wilson – 19/39, 243 yards, TD, INT
- WAS – Doug Williams – 9/26, 119 yards, 2 TD

Top rushers

- MIN – Wade Wilson – 4 rushes, 28 yards
- WAS – Timmy Smith – 13 rushes, 72 yards

Top receivers

- MIN – Anthony Carter – 7 receptions, 85 yards
- WAS – Gary Clark – 3 receptions, 57 yards, TD

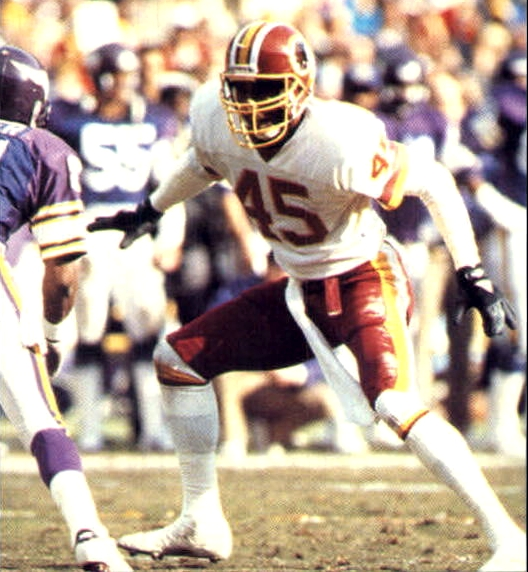
Redskins cornerback Barry Wilburn defending an opponent of the Minnesota Vikings during the NFC Championship Game.

In a defensive battle, the Redskins played a little better by limiting the Vikings to only 76 rushing yards and piling up eight sacks among seven different players (Dave Butz, Kurt Gouveia, Ravin Caldwell, Dexter Manley, Charles Mann, Alvin Walton, and Clarence Vaughn). The Vikings string of playoff upsets came to an end in a game that proved to be just as hard fought and intense as Washington's 27–24 overtime victory over them in Week 16 of the regular season.

Minnesota started off with a drive to the Redskins 35, but decided to punt rather than risk a long field goal. Bucky Scribner's 33-yard punt pinned the Redskins back at their own 2-yard line, but it didn't stop them from scoring on a 98-yard drive that included a 28-yard run by receiver Ricky Sanders on a reverse play and ended with running back Kelvin Bryant's 42-yard touchdown reception from quarterback Doug Williams. The Vikings went three and out on their next drive, and Scribner's punt traveled just 19 yards to the Redskins 45-yard line. Washington subsequently moved the ball to the Vikings 21, but came up empty when Ali Haji-Sheikh missed a 38-yard field goal.

Most of the remaining first half was a defensive struggle. With just over five minutes left, Washington running back Timmy Smith broke off a 34-yard run to the Vikings 31-yard line. But they failed to score again because of another missed field goal from Haji-Sheikh, this one from 47 yards. Minnesota took over and tied the game before halftime with quarterback Wade Wilson's 36-yard completion to tight end Steve Jordan setting up a 23-yard touchdown pass to Leo Lewis.

In the third quarter, Redskins linebacker Mel Kaufman picked off a pass that had been deflected by Butz (which turned out to be the only turnover of the game) and returned it 10 yards to the Minnesota 17-yard line to set up Haji-Sheikh's 28-yard field goal. In the final quarter, Wilson got the Vikings moving on a 10-play, 52-yard drive, finding receiver Anthony Carter for 23 yards, running back Allen Rice for 15, and Jordan for nine. Minnesota eventually got a first down on the Redskins 3-yard line, but Washington's defense made a stand, stopping them on three consecutive running plays and forcing them to settle for Chuck Nelson's 18-yard field goal to tie the game. The Redskins then marched 70 yards in eight plays, including Williams' 43-yard completion to Gary Clark, to score on Williams' 7-yard touchdown pass to Clark and take the lead, 17–10, with 5:06 left in the game, giving the Vikings one more chance for a game-tying drive. Minnesota subsequently advanced to the Washington 6-yard line, with Wilson completing five passes on the way there, but on fourth down and four with 56 seconds left in the game, running back Darrin Nelson dropped a potential touchdown catch after being tackled by cornerback Darrell Green, turning the ball over on downs and enabling the Redskins to run out the clock.

Williams completed only nine of 26 passes for 119 yards, but threw two touchdowns and no interceptions, while his team gained 161 yards on the ground, 72 from Smith. Wilson completed 19 of 39 passes for 243 yards and a touchdown, with one interception. Carter caught seven passes for 85 yards, and returned four punts for 57 yards.

This was the fourth postseason meeting between the Vikings and Redskins. Minnesota won two of the previous three meetings.

Previous playoff games
Minnesota leads 2–1 in all-time playoff games

1973

Washington Redskins 20 @ Minnesota Vikings 27

1973 NFC Divisional playoffs

1976

Washington Redskins 20 @ Minnesota Vikings 35

1976 NFC Divisional playoffs

1982

Minnesota Vikings 7 @ Washington Redskins 21

1982 NFC Second Round playoffs

==== AFC: Denver Broncos 38, Cleveland Browns 33 ====
Cleveland Browns vs. Denver Broncos – Game summary

Quarter	1	2	3	4	Total
Browns	0	3	21	9	33
Broncos	14	7	10	7	38

at Mile High Stadium, Denver, Colorado

- Game time: 4:00 p.m. EST/2:00 p.m. MST
- Game attendance: 76,197
- Referee: Jim Tunney
- TV announcers (NBC): Dick Enberg (play-by-play) and Merlin Olsen (color commentator)

Game information

First quarter

- DEN – Ricky Nattiel 8-yard pass from John Elway (Rich Karlis kick). Broncos 7–0.
- DEN – Steve Sewell 1-yard run (Rich Karlis kick). Broncos 14–0.

Second quarter

- CLE – Matt Bahr 24-yard field goal. Broncos 14–3.
- DEN – Gene Lang 1-yard run (Rich Karlis kick). Broncos 21–3.
- CLE – Reggie Langhorne 18-yard pass from Bernie Kosar (Matt Bahr kick). Broncos 21–10.

Third quarter

- DEN – Mark Jackson 80-yard pass from John Elway (Rich Karlis kick). Broncos 28–10.
- CLE – Earnest Byner 32-yard pass from Bernie Kosar (Matt Bahr kick). Broncos 28–17.
- CLE – Earnest Byner 4-yard run (Matt Bahr kick). Broncos 28–24.

Fourth quarter

- DEN – Rich Karlis 38-yard field goal. Broncos 31–24.
- CLE – Webster Slaughter 4-yard pass from Bernie Kosar (Matt Bahr kick). Tied 31–31.
- DEN – Sammy Winder 20-yard pass from John Elway (Rich Karlis kick). Broncos 38–31.
- CLE – Safety, Mike Horan ran out of end zone. Broncos 38–33.

Top passers

- CLE – Bernie Kosar – 26/41, 356 yards, 3 TD, INT
- DEN – John Elway – 14/26, 281 yards, 3 TD, INT

Top rushers

- CLE – Earnest Byner – 15 rushes, 67 yards, TD
- DEN – Sammy Winder – 20 rushes, 72 yards

Top receivers

- CLE – Earnest Byner – 7 receptions, 120 yards, TD
- DEN – Mark Jackson – 4 receptions, 134 yards, TD

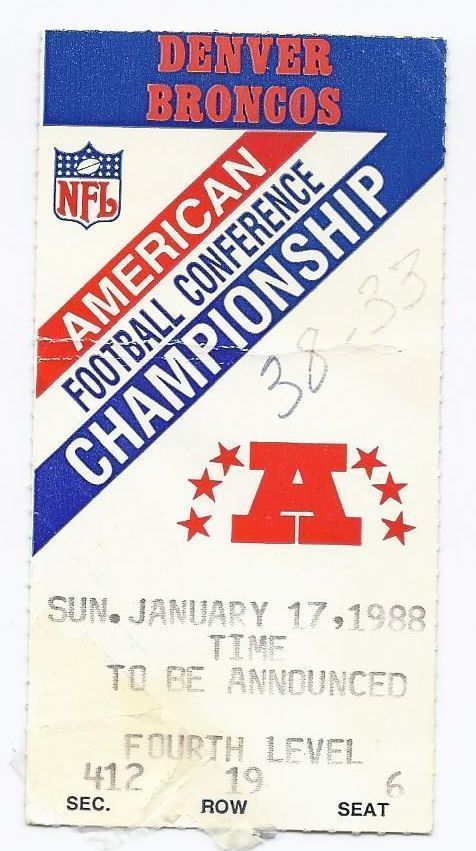
A ticket for the AFC Championship Game between the Browns and the Broncos.

This game is best remembered for The Fumble when Browns running back Earnest Byner fumbled at the Broncos' 2-yard line with 1:05 left. Also, these two teams were scheduled to meet during the regular season, however, the game happened to be scheduled during the week of games that was canceled (they were to meet on Monday Night Football).

Several early Cleveland miscues helped the Broncos jump to an early 14–0 lead. First, Cleveland kick returner Gerald McNeil was tackled by Tony Boddie on his own 12-yard line. Then after a sack by Denver players Simon Fletcher, Bernie Kosar threw a pass that went through the arms of Webster Slaughter and into the hands of linebacker Freddie Gilbert on the Browns 17, setting up John Elway's 8-yard touchdown pass to Ricky Nattiel. On Cleveland's next drive, fullback Kevin Mack lost a fumble while being tackled by Tony Lilly. One play later, Gene Lang's 42-yard run (surpassing the team's previous longest run of the season of 29 yards) gave Denver a first and goal situation. Elway eventually threw an incomplete pass on third and goal from the Browns 3-yard line, but a defensive holding penalty on Frank Minnifield gave Denver a first down at the 1, and running back Steve Sewell scored a touchdown on the next play.

After the ensuing kickoff, Kosar completed a 25-yard pass to tight end Ozzie Newsome and a 19-yarder to Clarence Weathers on third down and 17 on the way to a 29-yard field goal by Matt Bahr two minutes into the second quarter. But Denver stormed right back on an 80-yard drive that ended with a 1-yard touchdown run by Lang, making the score 21–3. A sack by Denver's Rulon Jones helped force the Browns to a three and out. This time all the Broncos could manage was a missed field goal by Rich Karlis. But once again Cleveland could not move the ball and turned it over with a fumble from receiver Brian Brennan that was recovered by cornerback Randy Robbins. This time the Browns defense stepped up, sacking Elway twice and forcing Denver's first punt of the game. After that, Kosar's 24-yard completion to Slaughter set up a 45-yard field goal attempt by Bahr, but he sent it wide right as time expired in the half.

Four plays into the second half, Felix Wright intercepted a pass from Elway, setting up Kosar's 18-yard touchdown pass to Reggie Langhorne. But less than a minute and a half later, Elway threw a short pass to receiver Mark Jackson, who broke a tackle from Mark Harper and evaded a tackle attempt from Wright on the way to an 80-yard touchdown reception (the longest play in Denver postseason history), giving the Broncos a 28–10 lead. Cleveland responded with two consecutive touchdowns. First Kosar threw a 32-yard touchdown pass to Byner. Then Broncos returner Ken Bell muffed the kickoff and was downed inside his own 10-yard line. Following a three and out, McNeil returned their punt to the Broncos 42. Kosar then completed four consecutive passes en route to a 4-yard touchdown run by Byner, making the score 28–24 with less than four minutes left in the third quarter. Denver struck back with a 38-yard field goal from Karlis to give them a seven-point lead going into the final quarter.

In the fourth quarter, the Browns drove 87 yards and tied the score with Kosar's 4-yard touchdown pass to Slaughter, but it was countered by Elway's 20-yard touchdown pass to running back Sammy Winder with four minutes left in the game.

After the ensuing kickoff, the Browns got the ball on their own 25-yard line. Byner started out the drive with a 16-yard burst and a 2-yard run, and then Kosar completed two passes to Brennan for 33 total yards. Following an encroachment penalty on defensive lineman Andre Townsend and a 6-yard run by Byner, an offsides penalty on Denver linebacker Karl Mecklenburg moved the ball to the Broncos 8-yard line with 1:12 remaining in regulation. The Browns had moved 67 yards in just six plays covering 2:41. On the next play, Byner took a handoff and appeared to be on his way to score the game-tying touchdown. But he was stripped of the ball by Jeremiah Castille, and fumbled at the 2-yard line. The Broncos recovered the fumble (Castille made the recovery), gave the Browns an intentional safety, and went on to win, 38–33.

Byner finished the game with 67 rushing yards, seven receptions for 120 yards, and two touchdowns. Elway finished the game completing 14 of 26 attempts for 281 yards and three touchdowns with an interception, and also rushed for 36 yards. His top target was Jackson, who caught four passes for 134 yards and a touchdown. Nattiel added five receptions for 95 yards and a touchdown.

This game was later featured on NFL's Greatest Games.

This was the second postseason meeting between the Browns and Broncos. Denver won the only prior meeting the previous year.

Previous playoff games
Denver leads 1–0 in all-time playoff games

1986

Denver Broncos 23 @ Cleveland Browns 20 (OT)

1986 AFC Championship Game

== Super Bowl XXII: Washington Redskins 42, Denver Broncos 10 ==
Super Bowl XXII – Washington Redskins vs. Denver Broncos – Game summary

Quarter	1	2	3	4	Total
Redskins (NFC)	0	35	0	7	42
Broncos (AFC)	10	0	0	0	10

at Jack Murphy Stadium, San Diego, California

- Date: January 31, 1988
- Game attendance: 73,302
- Referee: Bob McElwee
- TV announcers (ABC): Al Michaels (play-by-play), Frank Gifford, and Dan Dierdorf (color commentators)

This was the first Super Bowl meeting between the Redskins and Broncos.
