= 1984–85 NFL playoffs =

American football tournament

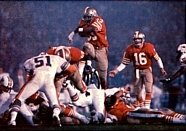
- The 49ers playing against the Dolphins in Super Bowl XIX.
- Dates: December 22, 1984–January 20, 1985
- Season: 1984
- Teams: 10
- Games played: 9
- Super Bowl XIX site: Stanford Stadium; Stanford, California
- Defending champions: Los Angeles Raiders
- Champion: San Francisco 49ers (2nd title)
- Runner-up: Miami Dolphins
- Conference runners-up: Chicago Bears; Pittsburgh Steelers
NFL playoffs
| ← 1983–84 | 1985–86 → |

The National Football League playoffs for the 1984 season began on December 22, 1984. The postseason tournament concluded with the San Francisco 49ers defeating the Miami Dolphins in Super Bowl XIX, 38–16, on January 20, 1985, at Stanford Stadium in Stanford, California.

== Participants ==
Within each conference, the three division winners and the two non-division winners with the best overall regular season records qualified for the playoffs. The NFL did not use a fixed-bracket playoff system. The three division winners were seeded 1–3 based on their overall won-lost-tied record, and received a first-round bye while the wild card teams were seeded 4 and 5, and played in the first round, dubbed the wild-card playoffs or wild-card weekend, with the 4 seed hosting. The second round, the divisional playoffs, had a restriction where two teams from the same division could not meet: the surviving wild card team visited the division champion outside its division that had the higher seed, and the remaining two teams from that conference played each other. The two surviving teams from each conference's divisional playoff games then met in the respective AFC and NFC Conference Championship games, hosted by the higher seed. Finally the Super Bowl, the championship round of the playoffs, was played at a neutral site, with the designated home team based on an annual rotation by conference.

Playoff seeds
| Seed | AFC | NFC |
|---|---|---|
| 1 | Miami Dolphins (East winner) | San Francisco 49ers (West winner) |
| 2 | Denver Broncos (West winner) | Washington Redskins (East winner) |
| 3 | Pittsburgh Steelers (Central winner) | Chicago Bears (Central winner) |
| 4 | Seattle Seahawks (wild card) | Los Angeles Rams (wild card) |
| 5 | Los Angeles Raiders (wild card) | New York Giants (wild card) |

== Bracket ==
Dec 30 – Mile High Stadium
3 | Pittsburgh | 24
Dec 22 – Kingdome | Jan 6 – Miami Orange Bowl
2 | Denver | 17
AFC
5 | LA Raiders | 7 | 3 | Pittsburgh | 28
Dec 29 – Miami Orange Bowl
4 | Seattle | 13 | 1 | Miami | 45
AFC Championship
4 | Seattle | 10
Jan 20 – Stanford Stadium
1 | Miami | 31
Divisional playoffs
Wild Card playoffs | A1 | Miami | 16
Dec 30 – RFK Stadium
N1 | San Francisco | 38
Super Bowl XIX
3 | Chicago | 23
Dec 23 – Anaheim Stadium | Jan 6 – Candlestick Park
2 | Washington | 19
NFC
5 | NY Giants | 16 | 3 | Chicago | 0
Dec 29 – Candlestick Park
4 | LA Rams | 13 | 1 | San Francisco | 23
NFC Championship
5 | NY Giants | 10
1 | San Francisco | 21

== Schedule ==
The two wild card games were held on different days because both venues were in the Pacific Time Zone. Playoff games normally started at either 12:30 p.m. Eastern Standard Time/9:30 a.m. Pacific Standard Time or 4 p.m. EST/1 p.m. PST. The NFL did not schedule prime time playoff games on the east coast until 2002. A 9:30 a.m. PST game was considered too early to be played on the west coast.

Starting with its coverage of Super Bowl XIX, ABC became part of the annual Super Bowl broadcasting rotation. The television rights to the first three rounds of the playoffs remained the same, with CBS televising the NFC games and NBC broadcasting the AFC games.

| Round | Away team | Score | Home team | Date | Kickoff (ET / UTC−5) | TV |
|---|---|---|---|---|---|---|
| Wild-card round | Los Angeles Raiders | 7–13 | Seattle Seahawks | December 22, 1984 | 4:00 p.m. | NBC |
| Wild-card round | New York Giants | 16–13 | Los Angeles Rams | December 23, 1984 | 3:30 p.m. | CBS |
| Divisional round | Seattle Seahawks | 10–31 | Miami Dolphins | December 29, 1984 | 12:30 p.m. | NBC |
| Divisional round | New York Giants | 10–21 | San Francisco 49ers | December 29, 1984 | 4:00 p.m. | CBS |
| Divisional round | Chicago Bears | 23–19 | Washington Redskins | December 30, 1984 | 12:30 p.m. | CBS |
| Divisional round | Pittsburgh Steelers | 24–17 | Denver Broncos | December 30, 1984 | 4:00 p.m. | NBC |
| Conference championships | Pittsburgh Steelers | 28–45 | Miami Dolphins | January 6, 1985 | 12:30 p.m. | NBC |
| Conference championships | Chicago Bears | 0–23 | San Francisco 49ers | January 6, 1985 | 4:00 p.m. | CBS |
| Super Bowl XIX Stanford Stadium Stanford, California | Miami Dolphins | 16–38 | San Francisco 49ers | January 20, 1985 | 6:15 p.m. | ABC |

== Wild-card round ==
=== Saturday, December 22, 1984 ===
==== AFC: Seattle Seahawks 13, Los Angeles Raiders 7 ====
Los Angeles Raiders vs. Seattle Seahawks – Game summary

| Quarter | 1 | 2 | 3 | 4 | Total |
|---|---|---|---|---|---|
| Raiders | 0 | 0 | 0 | 7 | 7 |
| Seahawks | 0 | 7 | 3 | 3 | 13 |

at Kingdome, Seattle, Washington

- Game time: 4:00 p.m. EST/1:00 p.m. PST
- Game attendance: 62,049
- Referee: Dick Jorgensen
- TV announcers (NBC): Charlie Jones and Bob Griese

Game information

First quarter

- No scoring plays.

Second quarter

- SEA – Daryl Turner 26-yard pass from Dave Krieg (Norm Johnson kick). Seahawks 7–0.

Third quarter

- SEA – Norm Johnson 35-yard field goal. Seahawks 10–0.

Fourth quarter

- SEA – Norm Johnson 44-yard field goal. Seahawks 13–0.
- RAI – Marcus Allen 46-yard pass from Jim Plunkett (Chris Bahr kick). Seahawks 13–7.

Top passers

- RAI – Jim Plunkett – 14/27, 184 yards, TD, 2 INT
- SEA – Dave Krieg – 4/10, 70 yards, TD

Top rushers

- RAI – Marcus Allen – 17 rushes, 61 yards
- SEA – Dan Doornink – 29 rushes, 126 yards

Top receivers

- RAI – Marcus Allen – 5 receptions, 90 yards, TD
- SEA – Daryl Turner – 1 reception, 26 yards, TD

The Seahawks rushed on 51 plays for 205 yards and the defense intercepted 2 passes and recorded 6 sacks to avenge their AFC championship loss to LA in the previous season. The Raiders crossed midfield only three times during the whole game, while Seattle's defense and Jeff West's punting constantly made them start each drive deep in their own territory. Their possessions in the game started from the 20, 4, 20, 18, 16, 22, 30, 20, 16, 16, 22 and 6-yard lines.

Seattle quarterback Dave Krieg completed only 4 of 10 passes in the game, but one was a 26-yard touchdown throw to Daryl Turner in the second quarter. Late in the third quarter, Seattle linebacker Bruce Scholtz forced a fumble from Frank Hawkins, and cornerback Keith Simpson recovered it on the Raiders 38. Krieg gained 13 yards with a scramble on the next play, and Norm Johnson finished the drive with a 35-yard field goal to put the team up 10-0 with 1:29 left in the third quarter. On LA's ensuing possession, quarterback Jim Plunkett, starting in his first game since week 6 of the regular season due to injuries, threw an interception to John Harris at the Seahawks 31-yard line, and Seattle ended up scoring another field goal on a 44-yard kick by Johnson, giving them a 13-0 lead.

With 5:05 left in the game, Plunkett threw a 47-yard touchdown pass to running back Marcus Allen. LA's defense managed to force a punt on the next series, but only after the Seahawks ran the clock down to 45 seconds, and West's kick pinned them back at their own 6-yard line. Seattle safety Kenny Easley then put the game away by intercepting a pass from Plunkett with 4 seconds left on the clock.

Dan Doornink recorded 29 carries for 126 rushing yards and a 14-yard reception. Defensive end Jacob Green had 2.5 sacks. Allen rushed for 61 yards, while also catching five passes for 90 yards and a score. This would be Seattle's last playoff victory until the 2005 NFC Divisional playoffs against the Washington Redskins.

This was the second postseason meeting between the Raiders and Seahawks. Los Angeles won the only previous meeting the previous year.

In his book about his years as a physician working for the Raiders "You're OK, It's Just a Bruise", Robert Huizenga wrote that Jacob Green's father had died suddenly in Texas right before the game, and Green was told by his mother that they were going to wait until the game was over to have Mr. Green's funeral so Jacob could be there to bury his dad. Green and his teammates dedicated the game to Mr. Green and absolutely destroyed the Raiders' offensive line on their way to victory.

Previous playoff games
Los Angeles Raiders leads 1–0 in all-time playoff games

1983

Seattle Seahawks 14 @ Los Angeles Raiders 30

1983 AFC Championship Game

=== Sunday, December 23, 1984 ===
==== NFC: New York Giants 16, Los Angeles Rams 13 ====
New York Giants vs. Los Angeles Rams – Game summary

| Quarter | 1 | 2 | 3 | 4 | Total |
|---|---|---|---|---|---|
| Giants | 10 | 0 | 6 | 0 | 16 |
| Rams | 0 | 3 | 7 | 3 | 13 |

at Anaheim Stadium, Anaheim, California

- Game time: 3:30 p.m. EST/12:30 p.m. PST
- Game weather: 64 °F (18 °C), mostly cloudy
- Game attendance: 67,037
- Referee: Ben Dreith
- TV announcers (CBS): Pat Summerall and John Madden

Game information

First quarter

- NYG – Ali Haji-Sheikh 37-yard field goal. Giants 3–0.
- NYG – Rob Carpenter 1-yard run (Ali Haji-Sheikh kick). Giants 10–0.

Second quarter

- RAMS – Mike Lansford 38-yard field goal. Giants 10–3.

Third quarter

- NYG – Ali Haji-Sheikh 39-yard field goal. Giants 13–3.
- RAMS – Eric Dickerson 14-yard run (Mike Lansford kick). Giants 13–10.
- NYG – Ali Haji-Sheikh 36-yard field goal. Giants 16–10.

Fourth quarter

- RAMS – Mike Lansford 22-yard field goal. Giants 16–13.

Top passers

- NYG – Phil Simms – 22/31, 179 yards
- RAMS – Jeff Kemp – 11/15, 109 yards

Top rushers

- NYG – Rob Carpenter – 13 rushes, 20 yards, TD
- RAMS – Eric Dickerson – 23 rushes, 107 yards, TD

Top receivers

- NYG – Zeke Mowatt – 7 receptions, 73 yards
- RAMS – Ron Brown – 3 receptions, 32 yards

In a defensive struggle, the Giants managed to pull out a win with key defensive stands on the last two LA drives.

After forcing the Rams to punt on the opening drive, New York scored first with kicker Ali Haji-Sheikh's 37-yard field goal. On the Rams ensuing drive, Giants linebacker Lawrence Taylor forced a fumble from Eric Dickerson, and defensive back Bill Currier recovered it at Los Angeles 23-yard line. This set up running back Rob Carpenter's 1-yard touchdown run, giving the Giants a 10-0 lead. Mike Lansford's 38-yard field goal in the second quarter cut the score to 10-3 going into halftime.

Haji-Sheikh kicked a 39-yard field goal in the third quarter, but this was countered by Dickerson's 14-yard touchdown run, making the score 13-10. New York responded with Haji-Sheikh's 36-yard field goal five minutes later to go up by 6 points. LA then took the ball back and drove to a first down on the Giants 7-yard line, with Dickerson rushing four times for 44 yards along the way. Dickerson picked up 3 more yards on the next play, but then Giants defensive end Leonard Marshall dropped fullback Dwayne Crutchfield for a 3-yard loss and Jeff Kemp's 3rd down completion to Henry Ellard picked up just 2 yards. Faced with 4th and goal from the 5, the Rams decided to settle for Lansford's 22-yard field goal, cutting their deficit to 16-13 with 7:02 left in the game.

Los Angeles caught a break on the Giants next possession when Joe Morris' 61-yard run was eliminated by a holding penalty against center Kevin Belcher and the team ended up punting. This gave the Rams one last chance to drive for the tying field goal or winning touchdown at the 2:48 mark. However, they were unable to gain even a single first down. Faced with 4th and 6 after three plays, Kemp was sacked by George Martin and fumbled the ball. Linebacker Andy Headen recovered for New York on the Rams 33, enabling them to run out the rest of the clock.

This game marked an impressive turnaround for the Giants, who had finished the previous year with a 3-12-1 record. Both teams combined for just 406 yards (214 for LA, 192 for New York). The only offensive star of the game was Dickerson, who rushed for 107 yards and a touchdown, though he rushed for only 37 yards on 12 carries in the first half, including his costly fumble.

This was the first postseason meeting between the Giants and Rams.

== Divisional round ==
=== Saturday, December 29, 1984 ===
==== AFC: Miami Dolphins 31, Seattle Seahawks 10 ====
Seattle Seahawks vs. Miami Dolphins – Game summary

| Quarter | 1 | 2 | 3 | 4 | Total |
|---|---|---|---|---|---|
| Seahawks | 0 | 10 | 0 | 0 | 10 |
| Dolphins | 7 | 7 | 14 | 3 | 31 |

at Miami Orange Bowl, Miami, Florida

- Game time: 12:30 p.m. EST
- Game weather: 79 °F (26 °C), partly cloudy, breezy
- Game attendance: 73,469
- Referee: Pat Haggerty
- TV announcers (NBC): Marv Albert and John Brodie

Game information

First quarter

- MIA – Tony Nathan 14-yard run (Uwe von Schamann kick). Dolphins 7–0.

Second quarter

- SEA – Norm Johnson 27-yard field goal. Dolphins 7–3.
- MIA – Jimmy Cefalo 34-yard pass from Dan Marino (Uwe von Schamann kick). Dolphins 14–3.
- SEA – Steve Largent 56-yard pass from Dave Krieg (Norm Johnson kick). Dolphins 14–10.

Third quarter

- MIA – Bruce Hardy 3-yard pass from Dan Marino (Uwe von Schamann kick). Dolphins 21–10.
- MIA – Mark Clayton 33-yard pass from Dan Marino (Uwe von Schamann kick). Dolphins 28–10.

Fourth quarter

- MIA – Uwe von Schamann 37-yard field goal. Dolphins 31–10.

Top passers

- SEA – Dave Krieg – 20/35, 234 yards, TD
- MIA – Dan Marino – 21/34, 262 yards, 3 TD, 2 INT

Top rushers

- SEA – Dan Doornink – 10 rushes, 35 yards
- MIA – Tony Nathan – 18 rushes, 76 yards, TD

Top receivers

- SEA – Steve Largent – 6 receptions, 128 yards, TD
- MIA – Mark Clayton – 5 receptions, 75 yards, TD

The Dolphins ran off 70 plays, gained 405 yards of total offense (including an uncharacteristic 143 yards rushing), and scored 17 unanswered points in the second half as they avenged last season's divisional round upset loss to Seattle. Meanwhile, Miami's defense, which had given up 134 points in the last five games of the season, held the Seahawks to just 267 yards. The Dolphins defense was particularly dominating on the ground, where they held Seattle to a mere 51 yards on 18 rushing attempts, an average of less than 3 yards per carry.

Miami started off the scoring with a 68-yard drive, featuring Dan Marino's 25-yard completion to Mark Clayton, that ended on Tony Nathan's 14-yard touchdown run. Near the end of the first quarter, Keith Simpson deflected a Marino pass into the arms of teammate John Harris, who returned the interception 32 yards to the Dolphins 39-yard line. Miami managed to keep the Seahawks out of the end zone, but Norm Johnson kicked a 27-yard field goal to put his team on the board at 7-3. On the Dolphins next drive, they were aided by a crucial penalty, an offsides call against the Seahawks that negated Marino's intercepted pass by Kenny Easley. Two plays later, Marino threw a 34-yard touchdown pass to Jimmy Cefalo, increasing the Dolphins lead to 14-3. However, Seattle quarterback Dave Krieg led his team back, firing a pass to receiver Steve Largent who caught the ball between two defenders and took off past cornerback Glen Blackwood for a 56-yard touchdown reception, cutting the score to 14-10 at the end of the half.

However, any thoughts of a Seattle comeback were quickly crushed in the second half. Following a missed field goal attempt by Johnson, Marino led the Dolphins 76 yards down the field to a 3-yard scoring reception by tight end Bruce Hardy, making the score 21-10. Seattle was quickly forced to punt on their next drive, and Jeff West shanked the kick, causing the ball to travel just 7 yards. Two plays later, Miami increased their lead to 28-10 on Marino's 33-yard touchdown pass to receiver Mark Clayton. In the fourth quarter, Dolphins kicker Uwe von Schamann made a 37-yard field goal that put the final score at 31-10.

Marino finished the game 21/34 for 262 yards and three touchdowns, with two interceptions (both by John Harris). The Dolphins 405 yards would be spread out quite evenly among the team, as their top rusher (Nathan) had only 76 yards, while their top receiver (Clayton) had 75. Krieg completed 20/35 passes for 234 yards and a touchdown, while also rushing for 2 yards and gaining one yard off a deflected pass that he caught himself. Largent was the top receiver of the game with 6 receptions for 128 yards and a touchdown.

This was the second postseason meeting between the Seahawks and Dolphins. Seattle won the only prior meeting the previous year.

Previous playoff games
Seattle leads 1–0 in all-time playoff games

1983

Seattle Seahawks 27 @ Miami Dolphins 20

1983 AFC Divisional playoffs

==== NFC: San Francisco 49ers 21, New York Giants 10 ====
New York Giants vs. San Francisco 49ers – Game summary

| Quarter | 1 | 2 | 3 | 4 | Total |
|---|---|---|---|---|---|
| Giants | 0 | 10 | 0 | 0 | 10 |
| 49ers | 14 | 7 | 0 | 0 | 21 |

at Candlestick Park, San Francisco

- Game time: 4:00 p.m. EST/1:00 p.m. PST
- Game weather: 41 °F (5 °C), fog
- Game attendance: 60,303
- Referee: Gene Barth
- TV announcers (CBS): Pat Summerall and John Madden

Game information

First quarter

- SF – Dwight Clark 21-yard pass from Joe Montana (Ray Wersching kick). 49ers 7–0.
- SF – Russ Francis 9-yard pass from Joe Montana (Ray Wersching kick). 49ers 14–0.

Second quarter

- NYG – Ali Haji-Sheikh 46-yard field goal. 49ers 14–3.
- NYG – Harry Carson 14-yard interception return (Ali Haji-Sheikh kick). 49ers 14–10.
- SF – Freddie Solomon 29-yard pass from Joe Montana (Ray Wersching kick). 49ers 21–10.

Third quarter

- No scoring plays.

Fourth quarter

- No scoring plays.

Top passers

- NYG – Phil Simms – 25/44, 218 yards, 2 INT
- SF – Joe Montana – 25/39, 309 yards, 3 TD, 3 INT

Top rushers

- NYG – Joe Morris – 17 rushes, 46 yards
- SF – Joe Montana – 3 rushes, 63 yards

Top receivers

- NYG – Zeke Mowatt – 5 receptions, 49 yards
- SF – Dwight Clark – 9 receptions, 112 yards, TD

Quarterback Joe Montana threw for 309 yards and 3 touchdown passes as he led the 49ers to a victory, while receiver Dwight Clark caught 9 passes for 112 yards and a touchdown. The 49ers defense also played exceptionally well, holding the Giants offense to a single field goal even though Montana was intercepted 3 times.

On San Francisco's first drive of the game, Montana completed a 21-yard touchdown pass to Clark. Ronnie Lott intercepted a pass and returned it 38 yards to set up Montana's 9-yard pass to Russ Francis that gave the 49ers a 14-0 lead just 6:48 into the game. In the second quarter, Giants linebacker Gary Reasons recorded his first of two interceptions on the day setting up Ali Haji-Sheikh's 46-yard field goal. Then linebacker Harry Carson recorded the first interception in his 9-year career and returned it 14 yards for a touchdown that cut the score to 14–10. But Montana responded with a 29-yard touchdown pass to Freddie Solomon, making the score 21-10 by the end of the second quarter.

Both defenses then controlled the rest of the game, allowing no points in the second half. In the third quarter, New York drove to the 49ers 18-yard line, only to have Phil Simms throw an interception to linebacker Riki Ellison. In the fourth quarter, New York moved the ball to the San Francisco 11, but Simms was sacked on third down. Now faced with 4th and 16, they decided to play conservative and take the field goal, but Haji-Sheikh's 33-yard kick went wide right. Following a punt, New York got the ball with 3:04 left and drove to the 49ers 22, this time turning the ball over on downs when Joe Morris was stuffed for no gain on 4th and inches. Finally, with 53 seconds left, San Francisco's defense closed out the game when Fred Dean forced a fumble from Simms that was recovered by 49ers lineman Dwaine Board.

This was the second postseason meeting between the Giants and 49ers. San Francisco won the only prior meeting.

Previous playoff games
San Francisco leads 1–0 in all-time playoff games

1981

New York Giants 24 @ San Francisco 49ers 38

1981 NFC Divisional playoffs

=== Sunday, December 30, 1984 ===
==== NFC: Chicago Bears 23, Washington Redskins 19 ====
Chicago Bears vs. Washington Redskins – Game summary

| Quarter | 1 | 2 | 3 | 4 | Total |
|---|---|---|---|---|---|
| Bears | 0 | 10 | 13 | 0 | 23 |
| Redskins | 3 | 0 | 14 | 2 | 19 |

at Robert F. Kennedy Memorial Stadium, Washington, D.C.

- Game time: 12:30 p.m. EST
- Game weather: 57 °F (14 °C), overcast
- Game attendance: 55,431
- Referee: Fred Silva
- TV announcers (CBS): Frank Glieber and Dick Vermeil

Game information

First quarter

- WAS – Mark Moseley 35-yard field goal. Redskins 3–0.

Second quarter

- CHI – Bob Thomas 34-yard field goal. Tied 3–3.
- CHI – Pat Dunsmore 19-yard pass from Walter Payton (Bob Thomas kick). Bears 10–3.

Third quarter

- CHI – Willie Gault 75-yard pass from Steve Fuller (kick failed). Bears 16–3.
- WAS – John Riggins 1-yard run (Mark Moseley kick). Bears 16–10.
- CHI – Dennis McKinnon 16-yard pass from Steve Fuller (Bob Thomas kick). Bears 23–10.
- WAS – John Riggins 1-yard run (Mark Moseley kick). Bears 23–17.

Fourth quarter

- WAS – Safety, Dave Finzer ran out of end zone. Bears 23–19.

Top passers

- CHI – Steve Fuller – 9/15, 211 yards, 2 TD
- WAS – Joe Theismann – 22/42, 292 yards, INT

Top rushers

- CHI – Walter Payton – 24 rushes, 104 yards
- WAS – John Riggins – 21 rushes, 50 yards, 2 TD

Top receivers

- CHI – Willie Gault – 1 reception, 75 yards, TD
- WAS – Art Monk – 10 receptions, 122 yards

The Bears upset the Redskins' bid for a third consecutive NFC championship with clutch plays and a stout defense that forced 3 turnovers and 7 sacks. Chicago's victory was Washington's first and only playoff defeat throughout their tenure at RFK Stadium.

With the scored tied 3–3 in the second quarter, the Bears executed a halfback option play at the Redskins' 19-yard line, with running back Walter Payton throwing a 19-yard touchdown to Pat Dunsmore. Then on the second play in the third period, Bears wide receiver Willie Gault caught a short pass from quarterback Steve Fuller, evaded Redskins cornerback Darrell Green who was too aggressive in trying to make an interception, and turned upfield for a 75-yard touchdown. Redskins running back John Riggins capped off a 74-yard drive with a 1-yard touchdown run then cut the lead, 16–10. But a running into the punter penalty call against Ken Coffey set up Dennis McKinnon's 16-yard reception to cap a Chicago 77-yard scoring drive to push their lead back to 13 at 23–10.

Washington attempted a comeback late in the third quarter. Rich Milot recovered a Fuller fumble at the Chicago 36-yard line, setting up a one-yard touchdown run by Riggins to cut the Bears lead to six. Then after being backed up deep in their own territory on fourth down with eight minutes left in the game, Chicago punter Dave Finzer stepped out of the end zone and gave the Redskins an intentional safety, making it 23–19. Washington then advanced to the Bears 24-yard line, but quarterback Joe Theismann threw three straight incompletions and Mark Moseley missed a 41-yard field goal attempt. Two other Washington possessions went nowhere and Chicago moved on to the NFC championship game.

Payton finished the game with a career postseason high 104 rushing yards, and caught one pass for 12.

This game would be the only time in Joe Gibbs' original tenure in Washington that his team would lose their opening playoff game. It happened for the only other time in what was Gibbs' final game in his career in the 2007-08 NFL playoffs to the Seattle Seahawks.

This was the fifth postseason meeting between the Bears and Redskins. Both teams previously split the prior four meetings.

Previous playoff games
Tied 2-2 in all-time playoff games

1937

Chicago Bears 21 @ Washington Redskins 28

1937 NFL Championship Game

1940

Chicago Bears 73 @ Washington Redskins 0

1940 NFL Championship Game

1942

Chicago Bears 6 @ Washington Redskins 14

1942 NFL Championship Game

1943

Washington Redskins 21 @ Chicago Bears 41

1943 NFL Championship Game

==== AFC: Pittsburgh Steelers 24, Denver Broncos 17 ====
Pittsburgh Steelers vs. Denver Broncos – Game summary

| Quarter | 1 | 2 | 3 | 4 | Total |
|---|---|---|---|---|---|
| Steelers | 0 | 10 | 7 | 7 | 24 |
| Broncos | 7 | 0 | 10 | 0 | 17 |

at Mile High Stadium, Denver, Colorado

- Game time: 4:00 p.m. EST/2:00 p.m. MST
- Game weather: 33 °F (0 °C), clear
- Game attendance: 74,981
- Referee: Fred Wyant
- TV announcers (NBC): Dick Enberg and Merlin Olsen

Game information

First quarter

- DEN – Jim Wright 9-yard pass from John Elway (Rich Karlis kick). Broncos 7–0.

Second quarter

- PIT – Gary Anderson 28-yard field goal. Broncos 7–3.
- PIT – Frank Pollard 1-yard run (Gary Anderson kick). Steelers 10–7.

Third quarter

- DEN – Rich Karlis 21-yard field goal. Tied 10–10.
- DEN – Steve Watson 20-yard pass from John Elway (Rich Karlis kick). Broncos 17–10.
- PIT – Louis Lipps 10-yard pass from Mark Malone (Gary Anderson kick). Tied 17–17.

Fourth quarter

- PIT – Frank Pollard 2-yard run (Gary Anderson kick). Steelers 24–17.

Top passers

- PIT – Mark Malone – 17/28, 224 yards, TD
- DEN – John Elway – 19/37, 184 yards, 2 TD, 2 INT

Top rushers

- PIT – Frank Pollard – 16 rushes, 99 yards, 2 TD
- DEN – Sammy Winder – 15 rushes, 37 yards

Top receivers

- PIT – Louis Lipps – 5 receptions, 86 yards, TD
- DEN – Steve Watson – 11 receptions, 177 yards, TD

Steelers running back Frank Pollard led the team to victory with 99 rushing yards, 4 receptions for 48 yards, and two touchdowns, the second in the game's closing minutes to the put Pittsburgh ahead for good.

The Broncos got their first chance to score after the opening drive, in which Rulon Jones's sack of Steelers quarterback Mark Malone forced a fumble that was recovered by defensive end Andre Townsend on the Steelers 23-yard line. But Denver only gained 1 yard with their next three plays and Rich Karlis missed a 39-yard field goal attempt. On the next play, Denver's Tom Jackson recovered a fumbled snap from Malone on the Steelers 22 set up quarterback John Elway's 9-yard touchdown pass to Jim Wright. Pittsburgh responded by moving the ball 62 yards to the Broncos 11-yard line, where Gary Anderson's 28-yard field goal made the score 7-3. Denver then drove to a 3rd and goal from the Steelers 6-yard line, only to lose the ball when Elway threw a pass that was intercepted by Pittsburgh defensive end Gary Dunn.

Late in the second quarter, Pollard rushed 4 times for 45 yards on a 78-yard drive that ended with his 1-yard touchdown run, giving the Steelers a 10-7 lead with 1:14 left in the half.

Denver tied the game in the third period when safety Roger Jackson blocked a punt give them a first and goal on the Pittsburgh 4-yard line, leading to Karlis' 21-yard field goal. The next time Denver got the ball, they drove 54 yards to take a 17-10 lead on Elway's 20-yard touchdown pass to Steve Watson (who finished with 11 receptions for 177 yards). But the Steelers tied the game with quarterback Mark Malone's 10-yard touchdown to Louis Lipps.

With 3 and half minutes left in the game, Pittsburgh drove into position for Anderson to attempt a go-ahead field goal, but he missed the kick from 26 yards. A few plays later, Steelers safety Eric Williams intercepted a pass from Elway and returned it 28 yards to the Broncos' 2-yard line to set up Pollard's winning 1-yard touchdown run.

Malone finished the game with 227 passing yards and a touchdown. Elway threw for 184 yards and two scores, but was sacked four times and intercepted twice. This was Elway's first playoff game as a starter; because of the Broncos' elimination, he was denied the opportunity to play in the only Super Bowl to be held at his college home field, Stanford Stadium. The Steelers outgained Denver who was outgained in ten of their 16 games in the regular season and ranked bottom 10 on total offense and total defense. Running back Sammy Winder, who rushed for 1,153 yards during the season, was held to just 37 yards on 15 carries.

This was the third postseason meeting between the Steelers and Broncos. Both teams split the prior two meetings.

Previous playoff games
Tied 1–1 in all-time playoff games

1977

Pittsburgh Steelers 21 @ Denver Broncos 34

1977 AFC Divisional playoffs

1978

Denver Broncos 10 @ Pittsburgh Steelers 33

1978 AFC Divisional playoffs

== Conference championships ==
=== Sunday, January 6, 1985 ===
==== AFC: Miami Dolphins 45, Pittsburgh Steelers 28 ====
Pittsburgh Steelers vs. Miami Dolphins – Game summary

| Quarter | 1 | 2 | 3 | 4 | Total |
|---|---|---|---|---|---|
| Steelers | 7 | 7 | 7 | 7 | 28 |
| Dolphins | 7 | 17 | 14 | 7 | 45 |

at Miami Orange Bowl, Miami, Florida

- Game time: 12:30 p.m. EST
- Game weather: 64 °F (18 °C), sunny
- Game attendance: 76,029
- Referee: Jerry Markbreit
- TV announcers (NBC): Dick Enberg and Merlin Olsen

Game information

First quarter

- MIA – Mark Clayton 40-yard pass from Dan Marino (Uwe von Schamann kick). Dolphins 7–0.
- PIT – Rich Erenberg 7-yard run (Gary Anderson kick). Tied 7–7.

Second quarter

- MIA – Uwe von Schamann 26-yard field goal. Dolphins 10–7.
- PIT – John Stallworth 65-yard pass from Mark Malone (Gary Anderson kick). Steelers 14–10.
- MIA – Mark Duper 41-yard pass from Dan Marino (Uwe von Schamann kick). Dolphins 17–14.
- MIA – Tony Nathan 2-yard run (Uwe von Schamann kick). Dolphins 24–14.

Third quarter

- MIA – Mark Duper 36-yard pass from Dan Marino (Uwe von Schamann kick). Dolphins 31–14.
- PIT – John Stallworth 19-yard pass from Mark Malone (Gary Anderson kick). Dolphins 31–21.
- MIA – Woody Bennett 1-yard run (Uwe von Schamann kick). Dolphins 38–21.

Fourth quarter

- MIA – Nat Moore 6-yard pass from Dan Marino (Uwe von Schamann kick). Dolphins 45–21.
- PIT – Wayne Capers 29-yard pass from Mark Malone (Gary Anderson kick). Dolphins 45–28.

Top passers

- PIT – Mark Malone – 20/36, 312 yards, 3 TD, 3 INT
- MIA – Dan Marino – 21/32, 421 yards, 4 TD, INT

Top rushers

- PIT – Walter Abercrombie – 15 rushes, 68 yards
- MIA – Tony Nathan – 19 rushes, 64 yards, TD

Top receivers

- PIT – John Stallworth – 4 receptions, 111 yards, 2 TD
- MIA – Mark Duper – 5 receptions, 148 yards, 2 TD

Pittsburgh racked up 455 yards of offense and converted 54% of their third downs, but it still wasn't enough to keep pace with Miami, who gained 569 yards in 71 plays en route to their fifth Super Bowl in franchise history. Dolphins quarterback Dan Marino led the Dolphins to a victory by throwing for 421 yards and 4 touchdowns (both AFC championship records) with 1 interception. Marino's record setting day was particularly noteworthy considering he threw his last pass with 11:05 left in the game. Steelers quarterback Mark Malone recorded 312 yards and 3 touchdowns, but was intercepted 3 times.

Miami scored first on Marino's 40-yard touchdown pass to wide receiver Mark Clayton, but Pittsburgh countered with running back Rich Erenberg's 7-yard rushing touchdown. Then after Dolphins kicker Uwe von Schamann made a 26-yard field goal, the Steelers took the lead, 14–10, with wide receiver John Stallworth's 65-yard touchdown reception. Marino struck back with a 41-yard touchdown to wide receiver Mark Duper. Then Dolphins safety Lyle Blackwood picked off a pass from Malone and returned it 4 yards to the Steelers 35. After an 11-yard run by Tony Nathan, the Dolphins suffered a setback when a touchdown pass was wiped out by a penalty. But Marino easily shook this off, completing a 28-yard pass to tight end Joe Rose at the 1-yard line on the next play. Nathan finished off the drive with a 2-yard touchdown run to give Miami a 24-14 halftime lead.

On the opening drive of the second half, Marino completed a 36-yard touchdown pass to Duper. Then after Stallworth caught a 19-yard touchdown, the Dolphins scored two more touchdowns, including Marino's fourth score, to clinch the victory. Malone threw a 29-yard touchdown pass to Wayne Capers in the final period to close out the scoring.

"We threw every defense we had at the guy -- zones, man-to-man, double- coverage, you name it, but the ball always seemed to get there before we did," Steelers safety Donnie Shell said. "The guy is incredible. He deserves what he's going to get, and to me that looks like a Super Bowl ring."

Duper finished the game with 5 receptions for 148 yards and 2 touchdowns. Clayton caught 4 passes for 95 yards and a score. Nathan rushed for 61 yards and a touchdown, while also catching 8 passes for 114 yards. Stallworth caught 4 passes for 111 yards and 2 touchdowns in the final postseason game of his Hall of Fame career.

This was the third postseason meeting between the Steelers and Dolphins. Both teams split the previous two meetings.

Previous playoff games
Tied 1–1 in all-time playoff games

1972

Miami Dolphins 21 @ Pittsburgh Steelers 17

1972 AFC Championship Game

1979

Miami Dolphins 14 @ Pittsburgh Steelers 34

1979 AFC Divisional playoffs

==== NFC: San Francisco 49ers 23, Chicago Bears 0 ====
Chicago Bears vs. San Francisco 49ers – Game summary

| Quarter | 1 | 2 | 3 | 4 | Total |
|---|---|---|---|---|---|
| Bears | 0 | 0 | 0 | 0 | 0 |
| 49ers | 3 | 3 | 7 | 10 | 23 |

at Candlestick Park, San Francisco

- Game time: 4:00 p.m. EST/1:00 p.m. PST
- Game weather: 52 °F (11 °C), drizzle
- Game attendance: 61,336
- Referee: Jerry Seeman
- TV announcers (CBS): Pat Summerall and John Madden

Game information

First quarter

- SF – Ray Wersching 21-yard field goal. 49ers 3–0.

Second quarter

- SF – Ray Wersching 22-yard field goal. 49ers 6–0.

Third quarter

- SF – Wendell Tyler 9-yard run (Ray Wersching kick). 49ers 13–0.

Fourth quarter

- SF – Freddie Solomon 10-yard pass from Joe Montana (Ray Wersching kick). 49ers 20–0.
- SF – Ray Wersching 34-yard field goal. 49ers 23–0.

Top passers

- CHI – Steve Fuller – 13/22, 87 yards, INT
- SF – Joe Montana – 18/34, 233 yards, TD, 2 INT

Top rushers

- CHI – Walter Payton – 22 rushes, 92 yards
- SF – Wendell Tyler – 10 rushes, 68 yards, TD

Top receivers

- CHI – Dennis McKinnon – 3 receptions, 48 yards
- SF – Dwight Clark – 4 receptions, 83 yards

The 49ers gained 387 yards while limiting the Bears to 186, with just 37 yards through the air. Chicago quarterback Steve Fuller completed just 13 of 22 passes for 87 yards and was sacked 9 times (twice each by Gary Johnson and Michael Carter).

Neither team played particularly well in the first half. Chicago took the opening kickoff and moved the ball 54 yards, 29 on carries by Walter Payton. But the drive stalled at the 49ers 23 and ended with no points when Bob Thomas missed a 41-yard field goal attempt. San Francisco then drove to the Chicago 2-yard line in 8 plays, but quarterback Joe Montana fumbled the snap on third down and had to dive on the ball. After that, Ray Wersching kicked a 21-yard field goal to make the score 3-0. 49ers safety Dwight Hicks gave the team a great chance to increase their lead more by intercepting a pass from Fuller in Chicago territory. San Francisco made it all the way to the 2-yard line again, but this time they did not even get a field goal as Montana was intercepted in the end zone by safety Gary Fencik.

A 66-yard drive to the Bears 4-yard set up Wersching's second field goal in the second quarter, giving the 49ers a 6-0 lead. Meanwhile, the Bears offense would go the entire period without gaining a first down. Fencik intercepted another pass from Montana, but Chicago could not do anything with the turnover opportunity.

Midway through the third quarter, the 49ers got into the end zone on a 5-play drive in which they never passed the ball. Running back Wendell Tyler rushed three times on it for 25 yards, the last carry a 9-yard score. Montana later threw a 10-yard touchdown pass to Freddie Solomon and Wersching finished off the scoring with a 34-yard field goal.

This was the first postseason meeting between the Bears and 49ers.

== Super Bowl XIX: San Francisco 49ers 38, Miami Dolphins 16 ==
Super Bowl XIX – Miami Dolphins vs. San Francisco 49ers – Game summary

| Quarter | 1 | 2 | 3 | 4 | Total |
|---|---|---|---|---|---|
| Dolphins (AFC) | 10 | 6 | 0 | 0 | 16 |
| 49ers (NFC) | 7 | 21 | 10 | 0 | 38 |

at Stanford Stadium, Stanford, California

- Date: January 20, 1985
- Game attendance: 84,059
- Referee: Pat Haggerty
- TV announcers (ABC): Frank Gifford, Don Meredith and Joe Theismann

This was the first Super Bowl meeting between the Dolphins and 49ers.
