= Gene Lang (American football) =

American football player (born 1962)

No. 33
- Position: Running back

Personal information
- Born: March 15, 1962 (age 64); Pass Christian, Mississippi, U.S.
- Listed height: 5 ft 10 in (1.78 m)
- Listed weight: 196 lb (89 kg)

Career information
- High school: Pass Christian (MS)
- College: LSU
- NFL draft: 1984: 11th round, 298th overall pick

Career history
- Denver Broncos (1984–1987); Atlanta Falcons (1988–1990)

Career NFL statistics
- Rushing yards: 1,148
- Rushing average: 3.6
- Rushing touchdowns: 11
- Stats at Pro Football Reference

Gene Eric Lang (born March 15, 1962) is an American former professional football player who was a running back in the National Football League (NFL). He played seven seasons for the Denver Broncos and the Atlanta Falcons. He attended Louisiana State University, where he played college football for the LSU Tigers and earned All-SEC honors as a freshman. He had 20 total touchdowns in his professional career: 11 rushing and nine receiving. He is perhaps best known for his role in the 1986 AFC Championship Game as his great recovery of a kickoff set up what is known in NFL lore as “The Drive”. Lang lives in Denver, Colorado, and owns a mortgage lending business.

== NFL career statistics ==
Legend
**Bold**	Career high

=== Regular season ===
Year	Team	Games		Rushing					Receiving				
Year	Team	GP	GS	Att	Yds	Avg	Lng	TD	Rec	Yds	Avg	Lng	TD
1984	DEN	**16**	0	8	42	**5.3**	15	2	4	24	6.0	9	1
1985	DEN	12	2	84	**318**	3.8	26	**5**	23	180	7.8	24	**2**
1986	DEN	15	2	29	94	3.2	14	1	13	105	8.1	26	**2**
1987	DEN	12	**8**	**89**	303	3.4	**28**	2	17	130	7.6	29	**2**
1988	ATL	**16**	3	53	191	3.6	19	0	37	398	10.8	**50**	1
1989	ATL	15	7	47	176	3.7	22	1	**39**	**436**	**11.2**	32	1
1990	ATL	3	0	9	24	2.7	9	0	1	7	7.0	7	0
		89	22	319	1,148	3.6	28	11	134	1,280	9.6	50	9

=== Playoffs ===
Year	Team	Games		Rushing					Receiving				
Year	Team	GP	GS	Att	Yds	Avg	Lng	TD	Rec	Yds	Avg	Lng	TD
1984	DEN	1	0	0	0	0.0	0	0	0	0	0.0	0	0
1986	DEN	**3**	0	**16**	55	3.4	14	0	**3**	6	2.0	4	0
1987	DEN	**3**	**2**	13	**83**	**6.4**	**42**	**2**	2	**32**	**16.0**	**25**	0
		7	2	29	138	4.8	42	2	5	38	7.6	25	0
