= Steve Watson (wide receiver) =

American football player and coach (born 1957)

No. 81
- Position: Wide receiver

Personal information
- Born: May 28, 1957 (age 69); Baltimore, Maryland, U.S.
- Listed height: 6 ft 4 in (1.93 m)
- Listed weight: 195 lb (88 kg)

Career information
- High school: St. Mark's (DE)
- College: Temple
- NFL draft: 1979: undrafted

Career history

Playing
- Denver Broncos (1979–1988)

Coaching
- Denver Broncos (2000) Intern; Denver Broncos (2001–2002) Defensive assistant; Denver Broncos (2003–2008) Wide receivers coach; University of Minnesota (2010–2011) Wide receivers coach; Indiana State University (2012) Wide receivers coach

Awards and highlights
- Second-team All-Pro (1981); Pro Bowl (1981); NFL receiving touchdowns co-leader (1981); Second-team All-East (1977); Delaware Sports Hall of Fame

Career NFL statistics
- Receptions: 353
- Receiving yards: 6,112
- Receiving touchdowns: 36
- Stats at Pro Football Reference

Steve Ross Watson (born May 28, 1957) is an American former professional football player who was a wide receiver for the Denver Broncos of the National Football League (NFL). He later became a wide receivers coach.

== College career ==
After high school at St. Mark's High School in Wilmington, Delaware, Watson attended Temple University. In four seasons for the Owls, Watson caught 98 passes for 1,629 yards (5th in school history) and 7 touchdowns. He was also a star on the track and field team as a long jumper, winning two conference titles. He was inducted into the school's athletic hall of fame in 1995.

== Pro career ==
Watson signed with the Denver Broncos as an undrafted free agent in 1979 and played his entire nine year NFL career for the team, appearing in 125 games. After recording only six receptions in each of his first two seasons, in 1981 Watson had 60 receptions for a career-best 1,244 yards and league-leading 13 TDs (including a 95-yard reception in game 6, the longest in the NFL that season and 3rd longest in franchise history). His 20.73 yards per catch remains a Broncos franchise record, and earned him a spot in the 1981 Pro Bowl. Watson had 555 receiving yards the 9-game strike-shortened season in 1982, hauled in 59 receptions for 1,133 yards in 1983 and a career-best 69 receptions for 1,170 in 1984. The 13-3 Broncos lost to Pittsburgh in the first round of the playoffs, but Watson had 11 receptions for a franchise record 177 yards. Watson started 31 of 32 games over the next two years, but saw his production fall to 915 yards, then 699. In the 1986 season, Watson assisted the team to a championship appearance in Super Bowl XXI, catching 2 passes for 54 yards in the game. After starting just one game in the 1987 season, Watson retired with career totals of 353 receptions for 6,112 yards and 36 touchdowns.

== NFL career statistics ==
Legend
	Led the league
**Bold**	Career high

=== Regular season ===
Year	Team	Games		Receiving				
Year	Team	GP	GS	Rec	Yds	Avg	Lng	TD
1979	DEN	**16**	0	6	83	13.8	22	0
1980	DEN	**16**	1	6	146	**24.3**	52	0
1981	DEN	**16**	13	60	**1,244**	20.7	**95**	**13**
1982	DEN	9	9	36	555	15.4	41	2
1983	DEN	**16**	**16**	59	1,133	19.2	78	5
1984	DEN	**16**	**16**	**69**	1,170	17.0	73	7
1985	DEN	**16**	15	61	915	15.0	60	5
1986	DEN	**16**	**16**	45	699	15.5	46	3
1987	DEN	5	1	11	167	15.2	49	1
		126	87	353	6,112	17.3	95	36

=== Playoffs ===
Year	Team	Games		Receiving				
Year	Team	GP	GS	Rec	Yds	Avg	Lng	TD
1979	DEN	1	0	0	0	0.0	0	0
1983	DEN	1	1	4	51	12.8	22	0
1984	DEN	1	1	**11**	**177**	16.1	**52**	**1**
1986	DEN	**3**	**3**	6	130	**21.7**	31	0
1987	DEN	**3**	0	0	0	0.0	0	0
		9	5	21	358	17.0	52	1

== Post-NFL career ==
In 1993, Watson was inducted into the Delaware Sports Museum and Hall of Fame. In 2000, he rejoined the Broncos as a defensive assistant. Since 2003 he has been a wide receivers coach. In 2010, he was hired by the Minnesota Golden Gophers football team to be their wide receivers coach.
