= Clarence Kay =

American football player (born 1961)

No. 88
- Position: Tight end

Personal information
- Born: July 30, 1961 (age 65); Seneca, South Carolina, U.S.
- Listed height: 6 ft 2 in (1.88 m)
- Listed weight: 237 lb (108 kg)

Career information
- High school: Seneca
- College: Georgia
- NFL draft: 1984: 7th round, 186th overall pick

Career history
- Denver Broncos (1984–1992)

Awards and highlights
- PFWA All-Rookie Team (1984); National champion (1980); Second-team All-SEC (1983)

Career NFL statistics
- Receptions: 193
- Receiving yards: 2,136
- Receiving touchdowns: 13
- Stats at Pro Football Reference

Clarence Hubert Kay (born July 30, 1961) is an American former professional football player. A 6'4", 237-lb. tight end from the University of Georgia, Kay was selected by the Denver Broncos in the 7th round of the 1984 NFL draft. Kay played in 9 NFL seasons from 1984 to 1992, all with the Broncos.

Between 1984 and 2006 Kay was arrested at least 12 times. In 2006 Kay pleaded guilty to harassment from domestic violence, and was sentenced to six months' imprisonment.

== NFL career statistics ==
Legend
| **Bold** | Career high |

=== Regular season ===
| Year | Team | Games | | Receiving | | | | |
| Year | Team | GP | GS | Rec | Yds | Avg | Lng | TD |
|---|---|---|---|---|---|---|---|---|
| 1984 | DEN | 16 | 13 | 16 | 136 | 8.5 | 21 | 3 |
| 1985 | DEN | 16 | 16 | 29 | 339 | 11.7 | 27 | 3 |
| 1986 | DEN | 13 | 12 | 15 | 195 | 13.0 | **34** | 1 |
| 1987 | DEN | 12 | 12 | 31 | **440** | **14.2** | 30 | 0 |
| 1988 | DEN | 14 | 14 | **34** | 352 | 10.4 | 27 | **4** |
| 1989 | DEN | 16 | 16 | 21 | 197 | 9.4 | 20 | 2 |
| 1990 | DEN | 16 | 14 | 29 | 282 | 9.7 | 22 | 0 |
| 1991 | DEN | 16 | 16 | 11 | 139 | 12.6 | 32 | 0 |
| 1992 | DEN | 16 | 13 | 7 | 56 | 8.0 | 15 | 0 |
| | | 135 | 126 | 193 | 2,136 | 11.1 | 34 | 13 |

=== Playoffs ===
| Year | Team | Games | | Receiving | | | | |
| Year | Team | GP | GS | Rec | Yds | Avg | Lng | TD |
|---|---|---|---|---|---|---|---|---|
| 1984 | DEN | 1 | 1 | 0 | 0 | 0.0 | 0 | 0 |
| 1986 | DEN | 2 | 1 | 2 | 23 | 11.5 | 15 | 0 |
| 1987 | DEN | 3 | 3 | **5** | **95** | **19.0** | **29** | **2** |
| 1989 | DEN | 3 | 0 | 1 | 6 | 6.0 | 6 | 0 |
| 1991 | DEN | 2 | 1 | 1 | 8 | 8.0 | 8 | 0 |
| | | 11 | 6 | 9 | 132 | 14.7 | 29 | 2 |
