= John Beake =

American football executive (1938–2026)

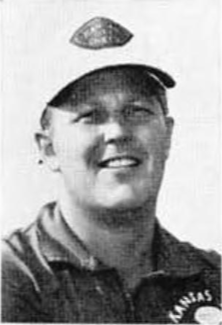
- Beake, c. 1974

Personal information
- Born: December 20, 1938; Long Branch, New Jersey, U.S.
- Died: October 17, 2026 (aged 87)

Career information
- College: Trenton State College; Pennsylvania State University

Career history

Coaching
- Penn State (1962) Graduate assistant; New York Military Academy (1963) Assistant coach; Nyack High School (1964–1967) Head coach; Kansas City Chiefs (1968–1974) Offensive backfield coach; Colorado State (1975) Offensive coordinator; New Orleans Saints (1976–1977) Offensive backfield coach

Operations
- Denver Broncos (1979–1980) Director of pro personnel; Denver Broncos (1981–1983) Director of player personnel; Denver Broncos (1984) Assistant general manager; Denver Broncos (1985–1998) General manager; Denver Broncos (1999–2000) Vice president of administration; NFL Europe (2001–2003) Managing director of football operations

Awards and highlights
- 3× Super Bowl champion (IV, XXXII, XXXIII)
- Executive profile at Pro Football Reference

John E. Beake (December 20, 1938 – October 17, 2026) was an American professional football executive who served as general manager of the Denver Broncos of the National Football League (NFL) from 1985 to 1998.

== Early life and education ==
Beake was born in Long Branch, New Jersey, on December 20, 1938. He graduated from Long Branch High School in 1957 and Trenton State College in 1961. He then earned a master's degree from Penn State, where he served as a graduate assistant under Rip Engle.

== Coaching ==
Beake was the head basketball and assistant football coach at New York Military Academy from 1963 to 1964. He then spent four seasons as the head football coach at Nyack High School, where he compiled a 24–4–4 record and won three league champions. In 1968 he was hired as an assistant coach by the Kansas City Chiefs. In his seven seasons in Kansas City, the Chiefs won three division titles, one conference championship, and Super Bowl IV. After one season as the offensive coordinator at Colorado State, Beake rejoined his Chiefs' former boss, Hank Stram, as the offensive backfield coach for the New Orleans Saints.

== Executive ==
In 1979, Beake joined the Denver Broncos as director of pro personnel. He was promoted to director of player personnel in 1981 and then assistant general manager in 1984. Shortly thereafter, the Broncos were sold and general manager Hein Poulus resigned. After going without a general manager for the 1984 season, the Broncos promoted Beake on February 18, 1985. Sitting third in the team's power structure behind the owner and head coach, Beake ran the administrative side of the Broncos, focusing on contract negotiations. During Beake's tenure as GM, the Broncos appeared in five Super Bowls, winning two of them (XXXII and XXXIII). On March 3, 1999, Beake was reassigned to the position of vice president of administration and Neal Dahlen succeeded him as general manager. He left the Broncos organization the following year to become the National Football League's vice president of player development and managing director of football operations for NFL Europe. In 2002 he was promoted to vice president of football development and operations. The NFL announced Beake's retirement on March 9, 2004.

== Death ==
Beake died on October 17, 2026, at the age of 87.
