= Scott Garnett =

American football player (born 1962)

No. 66, 92, 69
- Position: Defensive lineman

Personal information
- Born: December 3, 1962 (age 63); Harrisburg, Pennsylvania, U.S.
- Listed height: 6 ft 2 in (1.88 m)
- Listed weight: 271 lb (123 kg)

Career information
- High school: John Muir (Pasadena, California)
- College: Washington
- NFL draft: 1984: 8th round, 218th overall pick

Career history
- Denver Broncos (1984); San Francisco 49ers (1985); San Diego Chargers (1985); Buffalo Bills (1987)

Career NFL statistics
- Sacks: 3
- Fumble recoveries: 1
- Stats at Pro Football Reference

Scott Aaron Garnett (born December 3, 1962) is an American former professional football player who was a defensive lineman for four seasons in the National Football League (NFL) for the Denver Broncos, San Francisco 49ers, San Diego Chargers, and Buffalo Bills. He played college football for the Washington Huskies and was selected in the eighth round of the 1984 NFL draft.

== College career ==
Garnett was a four-year letterman for Washington from 1980 to 1983.
