= Marsharne Graves =

American football player (born 1962)

No. 72, 61
- Position: Offensive tackle

Personal information
- Born: July 8, 1962 (age 64); Memphis, Tennessee, U.S.
- Listed height: 6 ft 3 in (1.91 m)
- Listed weight: 268 lb (122 kg)

Career information
- High school: Abraham Lincoln (San Francisco, California)
- College: Arizona (1980–1983)
- NFL draft: 1984: undrafted

Career history
- Denver Broncos (1984–1985); Indianapolis Colts (1987)

Awards and highlights
- Second-team All-Pac-10 (1983)
- Stats at Pro Football Reference

Marsharne DeWayne Graves (born July 8, 1962) is an American former professional football player who was an offensive tackle for two seasons in the National Football League (NFL) with the Denver Broncos and Indianapolis Colts. He played college football for the Arizona Wildcats.

== Early life and college ==
Marsharne DeWayne Graves was born on July 8, 1962, in Memphis, Tennessee. He attended Abraham Lincoln High School in San Francisco, California.

He lettered for the Arizona Wildcats from 1980 to 1983. He was named second-team All-Pac-10 by the coaches in 1983.

== Professional career ==
After going undrafted in the 1984 NFL draft, Graves signed with the Denver Broncos on May 2, 1984. He was released on August 27 but later re-signed on November 5, 1984. He played in one regular season game and one playoff game for the Broncos during the 1984 season. Graves was placed on injured reserve on August 26, 1985, and spent the entire season there. He was released by the Broncos in 1986.

On September 23, 1987, Graves signed with the Indianapolis Colts as a replacement player during the 1987 NFL players strike. He started three game for the Colts before the strike ended. Graves was released on October 19, 1987.
