= Rich Karlis =

American football player (born 1959)

No. 3, 1
- Position: Placekicker

Personal information
- Born: May 23, 1959 (age 67); Salem, Ohio, U.S.
- Listed height: 6 ft 0 in (1.83 m)
- Listed weight: 180 lb (82 kg)

Career information
- High school: Salem
- College: Cincinnati
- NFL draft: 1981: undrafted

Career history
- Houston Oilers (1981)*; Denver Broncos (1982–1988); Minnesota Vikings (1989); Detroit Lions (1990); Atlanta Falcons (1991)*
- * Offseason or practice squad member only

Career NFL statistics
- Field goals: 172
- Field goals attempted: 239
- Field Goal %: 72
- Extra points: 283
- Points scored: 799
- Stats at Pro Football Reference

Richard John Karlis (born May 23, 1959) is an American former professional football player who was a placekicker for nine seasons for the Denver Broncos, Minnesota Vikings, and Detroit Lions in the National Football League (NFL) from 1982 to 1990. He played college football for the Cincinnati Bearcats and is known as the last of the field goal kickers who kicked barefoot full-time in the NFL.

Karlis is best known for kicking the game-winning field goal in overtime for Denver against the Cleveland Browns in the 1986 AFC Championship Game to reach Super Bowl XXI. He had an uneven performance in Denver's loss in Super Bowl XXI, tying a Super Bowl record with a 48-yard field goal, while missing a 23-yard attempt, the shortest missed field goal in Super Bowl history at that time. He also appeared in Super Bowl XXII for the Broncos the following year, making one of his two attempts in another Denver loss.

In 1989, as a member of the Vikings, he tied a then NFL record by kicking seven field goals in a 23–21 win against the Los Angeles Rams, a record which stood until 2007 when Rob Bironas of the Tennessee Titans broke the record with eight field goals in a game against the Houston Texans.

Karlis made 172 field goals and 283 extra point attempts for 799 points in his career. He once held the record for most field goal attempts in Super Bowls with six (making three of them) and holds other records including most consecutive field goals made as a rookie with thirteen in 1982.

Karlis is the creator of an instructional video for kickers.

== Career regular season statistics ==
Career high/best bold

Season	Team	G	FGM	FGA	%	LNG	XPM	XPA	%	PTS
1982	DEN	9	11	13	84.6	47	15	16	93.8	48
1983	DEN	16	21	25	84.0	50	33	34	97.1	96
1984	DEN	16	21	28	75.0	50	38	41	92.7	101
1985	DEN	16	23	38	60.5	48	41	44	93.2	110
1986	DEN	16	20	28	71.4	51	44	45	97.8	104
1987	DEN	12	18	25	72.0	51	37	37	100.0	91
1988	DEN	16	23	36	63.9	51	36	37	97.3	105
1989	MIN	13	31	39	79.5	51	27	28	96.4	120
1990	DET	6	4	7	57.1	39	12	12	100.0	24
Career		120	172	239	72.0	51	283	294	96.3	799
