= Aaron Smith (linebacker) =

American football player (1962–2008)

- Smith, circa 1984

No. 56
- Position: Linebacker

Personal information
- Born: August 10, 1962; Los Angeles, California, U.S.
- Died: November 2008 (aged 46)
- Listed height: 6 ft 2 in (1.88 m)
- Listed weight: 223 lb (101 kg)

Career information
- High school: St. Bernard (Los Angeles)
- College: Utah State
- NFL draft: 1984: 6th round, 159th overall pick

Career history
- Denver Broncos (1984–1985)

Awards and highlights
- Second-team All-Big West (1983)
- Stats at Pro Football Reference

Aaron Clayton Smith (August 10, 1962 – November 2008) was an American professional football linebacker who played for the Denver Broncos of the National Football League (NFL). He played college football for the Utah State Aggies and was selected by the Broncos in the sixth round of the 1984 NFL draft.

== Early life ==
Aaron Clayton Smith was born on August 10, 1962, in Los Angeles, California. He attended St. Bernard High School in Los Angeles.

== College career ==
Smith enrolled at Utah State University to play college football for the Aggies. He was on the varsity team in 1980 but did not play enough to earn a letter. He was a three-year letterman from 1981 to 1983. Smith led the team with 131 tackles as a senior in 1983, garnering second-team All-Big West Conference recognition. He finished his college career with 244 tackles.

== Professional career ==
Smith was selected by the Broncos in the sixth round, with the 159th overall pick, of the 1984 NFL draft. He signed with the team on June 7, joining former Utah State teammate Greg Kragen on the Broncos. Smith played in the first ten games of the 1984 season as a reserve linebacker, recording one kick return that he turned for two yards before fumbling the ball. He was placed on injured reserve on November 5, 1984. He was placed on injured reserve again on August 26, 1985, missing the entire 1985 season. Smith was released on August 18, 1986, after the second game of the 1986 preseason.

== Personal life ==
Smith's brother, Al Smith, also played in the NFL. Aaron died in November 2008 of an apparent heart attack.
