= John Harris (safety) =

American football player (born 1956)

No. 44
- Position: Safety

Personal information
- Born: June 13, 1956 (age 70); Fort Benning, Georgia, U.S.
- Listed height: 6 ft 2 in (1.88 m)
- Listed weight: 200 lb (91 kg)

Career information
- High school: Miami Jackson (Miami, Florida)
- College: Arizona State
- NFL draft: 1978: 7th round, 173rd overall pick

Career history
- Seattle Seahawks (1978–1985); Minnesota Vikings (1986–1988)

Awards and highlights
- PFWA All-Rookie Team (1978); Seattle Seahawks Top 50 players

Career NFL statistics
- Games played: 160
- Interceptions: 50
- Sacks: 1
- Touchdowns: 2
- Stats at Pro Football Reference

John Edward Harris (born June 13, 1956) is an American former professional football player who was a safety in the National Football League (NFL). He was selected by the Seattle Seahawks in the seventh round of the 1978 NFL draft. He played college football for the Arizona State Sun Devils.

Harris also played for the Minnesota Vikings.

== Professional career ==
=== Seattle Seahawks ===
Harris was selected by the Seattle Seahawks in the seventh round of the 1978 NFL draft. He played eight years for the team from 1978 to 1985. During that time he started 111 of 119 games and had 41 interceptions, returning two for touchdowns. In 1981, he had a team high ten interceptions, two of which he returned for touchdowns. Harris had four seasons with the Seattle Seahawks in which he would have six interceptions or more.

=== Minnesota Vikings ===
In 1986 Harris was traded to the Minnesota Vikings. He played three years for the team from 1986 to 1988. During that time he started 37 of 41 games, recording nine interceptions and two sacks.

After the 1988 season Harris retired after 11 years in the NFL. He finished his career starting 148 of 160 games, recording 50 interceptions, two touchdowns, a sack, and 12 fumble recoveries.
