= John Sawyer (American football) =

American football player (born 1953)

No. 81, 82, 83
- Position: Tight end

Personal information
- Born: July 26, 1953 (age 73); Brookhaven, Mississippi, U.S.
- Listed height: 6 ft 2 in (1.88 m)
- Listed weight: 230 lb (104 kg)

Career information
- High school: Baker (LA)
- College: Southern Miss
- NFL draft: 1975: 11th round, 271st overall pick

Career history
- Houston Oilers (1975–1976); Seattle Seahawks (1977–1982); Washington Redskins (1983); Denver Broncos (1983–1984)

Career NFL statistics
- Games played: 110
- Receptions: 129
- Receiving yards: 1,496
- Receiving touchdowns: 2
- Stats at Pro Football Reference

John Wesley Sawyer (born July 26, 1953) is an American former professional football player who was a tight end in the National Football League (NFL) for the Houston Oilers, Seattle Seahawks, Washington Redskins, and Denver Broncos. He played college football for the Southern Miss Golden Eagles and was selected in the 11th round of the 1975 NFL draft.
