= Chris Norman (American football) =

American football player (born 1962)

No. 1, 4
- Position: Punter

Personal information
- Born: May 25, 1962 (age 64); Albany, Georgia, U.S.
- Listed height: 6 ft 2 in (1.88 m)
- Listed weight: 198 lb (90 kg)

Career information
- High school: Dougherty (GA)
- College: South Carolina
- NFL draft: 1984: undrafted

Career history
- Denver Broncos (1984–1986)

Career NFL statistics
- Punts: 218
- Punt yards: 8,782
- Longest punt: 83
- Stats at Pro Football Reference

Chris Cooper Norman (born May 25, 1962) is a former punter in National Football League (NFL). He played his entire 3-year career for the Denver Broncos. First-team All-South Independent (1983)
