= James Wright (tight end) =

American football player (born 1956)

Jim Wright
No. 83, 87
- Position: Tight end

Personal information
- Born: September 1, 1956 (age 70); Fort Hood, Texas, U.S.
- Listed height: 6 ft 3 in (1.91 m)
- Listed weight: 240 lb (109 kg)

Career information
- High school: Brenham (TX)
- College: TCU
- NFL draft: 1978: 7th round, 179th overall pick

Career history
- Atlanta Falcons (1978–1979); Denver Broncos (1980–1985)

Career NFL statistics
- Receptions: 66
- Receiving yards: 666
- Touchdowns: 4
- Stats at Pro Football Reference

James Willie Wright (born September 1, 1956) is an American former professional football player who was a tight end for seven seasons with the Atlanta Falcons and the Denver Broncos of the National Football League (NFL). He played college football for the TCU Horned Frogs.

Wright played special teams for Atlanta in 1978 before finding himself with the Broncos by 1980. After being mostly a bystander, Wright found his role grow under new head coach Dan Reeves starting in 1982. His best, and final, season came in 1985 when he started twelve games for the Broncos and recorded 28 catches for 246 yards and a touchdown.
