= Tony Lilly =

American football player and coach (born 1962)

No. 22
- Position: Safety

Personal information
- Born: February 16, 1962 (age 64); Alexandria, Virginia, U.S.
- Listed height: 6 ft 0 in (1.83 m)
- Listed weight: 199 lb (90 kg)

Career information
- High school: Woodbridge (Lake Ridge, Virginia)
- College: Florida
- NFL draft: 1984: 3rd round, 78th overall pick

Career history

Playing
- Denver Broncos (1984–1987)

Coaching
- Potomac Senior High School (2005–2009); C.D. Hylton High School (2010–2019)

Awards and highlights
- Second-team All-American (1983); First-team All-SEC (1983); 2× Second-team All-SEC (1981, 1982)

Career NFL statistics
- Games played: 58
- Games started: 15
- Interceptions: 9
- Fumble recoveries: 3
- Stats at Pro Football Reference

Robert Anthony Lilly (born February 16, 1962) is an American former professional football player who was a safety for four seasons with the Denver Broncos of the National Football League (NFL) during the 1980s. Lilly played college football for the Florida Gators, and thereafter, he played professionally for the Denver Broncos of the NFL.

== Early life ==
Lilly was born in Alexandria, Virginia in 1962. When he was 9 years old he represented the Washington, D.C. area in the NFL's Punt, Pass, and Kick competition. In 1979, Lilly was one of five players from Northern Virginia named to United Press International's Virginia All-State football team. He attended Woodbridge High School in Woodbridge, Virginia, and he was a standout player for the Woodbridge Vikings high school football team. On October 2, 2004, Woodbridge High School retired the numbers of three former football players, including Lilly's No. 18.

== College career ==
Lilly accepted an athletic scholarship to attend the University of Florida in Gainesville, Florida, where he played for coach Charley Pell's Florida Gators football team from 1980 to 1983. He became a starter as a freshman when Tim Groves was injured late in the 1980 season, and remained a regular member of the Gators' starting lineup for his remaining three seasons. As a senior in 1983, Lilly was honored as a first-team All-Southeastern Conference (SEC) selection and a second-team All-American.

== Professional career ==
The Denver Broncos drafted Lilly in the third round (78th pick overall) in the 1984 NFL draft. He played for the Broncos for four seasons from 1984 to 1987. Lilly started at safety for the Broncos vs. Washington in Super Bowl XXII. Lilly was badly beaten (even though he had the angle of pursuit) by RB Timmy Smith on a 58-yard TD run and was also torched by WR Ricky Sanders on 80 and 50-yard TD receptions, all during Washington's epic 35-point 2nd quarter explosion; this would be Lilly's last game played in the NFL. In his four-year NFL career, he played in fifty-eight games, started fifteen of them, and totaled nine interceptions and three fumble recoveries.

== Life after the NFL ==
Lilly was a special education instructor and the head football coach at Potomac Senior High School located in Dumfries, Virginia from 2005 to 2009. In 2006, Lilly coached the Panthers to an 11–2 record in his second season and capturing the Cardinal District and Northwest Regional championships in the state of Virginia. The only two losses that season were to eventual Virginia Division 6 state champion Osbourn High School and Division 5 champion Phoebus High School.

In 2007, Lilly guided the Panthers to a perfect 10–0 regular season on the way to the Virginia Division 5 state championship game, before losing to Stone Bridge High School in the final. His 2007 Potomac Panthers finished the season 13–1 overall.

On May 4, 2010, Lilly was named the head football coach of C.D. Hylton High School in Woodbridge, Virginia, where he also serves as the head television production teacher. In his first season as head coach, he directed the team to a 10–0 regular season, before losing in their first playoff game against Battlefield, the eventual Division 6 champion who they had defeated earlier in the season.

== See also ==
- History of the Denver Broncos
- List of Florida Gators in the NFL draft
