= Randy Robbins (American football) =

American football player (born 1962)

No. 48
- Position: Cornerback

Personal information
- Born: September 14, 1962 (age 64); Casa Grande, Arizona, U.S.
- Listed height: 6 ft 2 in (1.88 m)
- Listed weight: 189 lb (86 kg)

Career information
- High school: Casa Grande Union
- College: Arizona
- NFL draft: 1984: 4th round, 89th overall pick

Career history
- Denver Broncos (1984–1991); New England Patriots (1992)

Awards and highlights
- Second-team All-American (1983); First-team All-Pac-10 (1983)

Career NFL statistics
- Interceptions: 13
- Fumble recoveries: 10
- Sacks: 8
- Stats at Pro Football Reference

Randy Robbins (born September 14, 1962) is an American former professional football player who was a defensive back in the National Football League (NFL).

Born and raised in Casa Grande, Arizona, Robbins played scholastically at Casa Grande Union High School. He played collegiately for the Arizona Wildcats, and, as a senior, was honored by Gannett News Service (GNS) as a second-team All-American.

A fourth round selection (89th overall pick) in the 1984 NFL draft, Robbins played for the Denver Broncos for eight seasons (1984–1991). He spent his final year in the NFL (1992) with the New England Patriots. For his career, Robbins recorded 13 interceptions (returning 2 for touchdowns), 8 sacks, and 10 fumble recoveries.

His cousin is Mike Scurlock, who played for the St. Louis Rams and the Carolina Panthers.
