= Andre Townsend =

American football player (born 1962)

No. 61
- Position: Defensive end

Personal information
- Born: October 8, 1962 (age 64); Chicago, Illinois, U.S.
- Listed height: 6 ft 3 in (1.91 m)
- Listed weight: 265 lb (120 kg)

Career information
- High school: Aberdeen (Mississippi)
- College: Ole Miss
- NFL draft: 1984: 2nd round, 46th overall pick

Career history
- Denver Broncos (1984–1990); Green Bay Packers (1992)*
- * Offseason or practice squad member only

Awards and highlights
- Third-team All-American (1983); 2× Second-team All-SEC (1982, 1983)

Career NFL statistics
- Sacks: 22
- Fumble recoveries: 6
- Touchdowns: 1
- Stats at Pro Football Reference

Andre Townsend (born October 8, 1962) is an American former professional football player who was a defensive end for seven seasons with the Denver Broncos of the National Football League (NFL).

Townsend was born in Chicago, Illinois. After a standout high school career for the Aberdeen, Mississippi High School Bulldogs, he played college football for the Ole Miss Rebels As a senior, he was honored by Football News as a third-team All-American.

Townsend was selected by the Broncos in the second round of the 1984 NFL draft. He spent his entire career with the Broncos, and started in Super Bowl XXI and Super Bowl XXII. He accumulated 22 career sacks and 6 fumble recoveries.
