= Rulon Jones =

American football player (born 1958)

No. 75
- Position: Defensive end

Personal information
- Born: March 25, 1958 (age 68); Salt Lake City, Utah, U.S.
- Listed height: 6 ft 6 in (1.98 m)
- Listed weight: 260 lb (118 kg)

Career information
- High school: Weber (Pleasant View, Utah)
- College: Utah State
- NFL draft: 1980: 2nd round, 42nd overall pick

Career history
- Denver Broncos (1980–1988)

Awards and highlights
- First-team All-Pro (1986); Second-team All-Pro (1985); 2× Pro Bowl (1985, 1986); PFWA All-Rookie Team (1980); UPI AFL-AFC Player of the Year (1986); Second-team All-American (1979)

Career NFL statistics
- Sacks: 73.5
- Fumble recoveries: 10
- Safeties: 3
- Touchdowns: 1
- Stats at Pro Football Reference

Rulon Kent Jones (born March 25, 1958) is an American former professional football player who spent his entire career as a defensive end for the Denver Broncos of the National Football League (NFL).

Jones played college football for the Utah State Aggies and was selected by the Broncos in the 1980 NFL draft. During his career, Jones played in 129 games and recorded 52.5 official quarterback sacks. Sacks were an unofficial statistic in his first two seasons, when he had 11 1/2 in 1980 and 9 1/2 in 1981.

During the 1986 season, he was named the UPI AFL-AFC Player of the Year on defense.

Rulon Davis was named after Jones and would also go on to play with the Broncos in the 2000s. Jones retired after the 1988 season.
