= 1984 USFL draft =

Second collegiate draft of the United States Football League

General information
- Date: January 4, 1984
- Location: The Roosevelt Hotel, New York

Overview
- 405 total selections in 19 rounds
- League: USFL
- First selection: Mike Rozier, RB; Pittsburgh Maulers

The 1984 USFL draft was the second collegiate draft of the United States Football League (USFL). It took place on January 4, 1984, at The Roosevelt Hotel in New York. The new six expansion teams were given the first six selections, followed by the established teams' picks, then followed by six additional selections by the expansion teams. In the even numbered rounds, the established teams chose first, followed by the expansion teams.

The Pittsburgh Maulers used the first overall pick to select running back Mike Rozier.

== Player selections ==
= All-Star
= USFL MVP

Round	Pick #	USFL team	Player	Position	College
1	1	Pittsburgh Maulers	Mike Rozier	RB	Nebraska
1	2	Oklahoma Outlaws	Ron Faurot	DE	Arkansas
1	3	Chicago Blitz	Irving Fryar	WR	Nebraska
1	4	Memphis Showboats	Barney Bussey	S	South Carolina State
1	5	Arizona Wranglers	Keith Millard	DT	Washington State
1	6	Jacksonville Bulls	Gary Clark	WR	James Madison
1	7	Chicago Blitz	Albert Bentley	RB	Miami (FL)
1	8	Washington Federals	Allanda Smith	S	TCU
1	9	New Jersey Generals	Draft choice forfeited for signing Herschel Walker	RB	Georgia
1	10	Denver Gold	Russell Carter	CB	SMU
1	11	Los Angeles Express	Steve Young	QB	BYU
1	12	Oakland Invaders	Cliff Benson	TE	Purdue
1	13	Birmingham Stallions	Kyle Clifton	LB	TCU
1	14	New Orleans Breakers	Buford Jordan	RB	McNeese State
1	15	New Jersey Generals	Steve DeOssie	LB	Boston College
1	16	Arizona Wranglers	Lupe Sanchez	S	UCLA
1	17	Philadelphia Stars	Scott Raridon	T	Nebraska
1	18	Michigan Panthers	Stanford Jennings	RB	Furman
1	19	Oakland Invaders	Bo Eason	CB	UC Davis
1	20	New Jersey Generals	Eric Williams	DT	Washington State
1	21	Memphis Showboats	Martin Bayless	CB	Bowling Green
1	22	San Antonio Gunslingers	Don Rogers	S	UCLA
1	23	Oklahoma Outlaws	Conrad Goode	T	Missouri
1	24	Los Angeles Express	Kevin Nelson	RB	UCLA
2	25	Washington Federals	Fred Robinson	DE	Miami (FL)
2	26	Chicago Blitz	Terry Taylor	DB	Southern Illinois
2	27	New Jersey Generals	Gary Reasons	LB	Northwestern State
2	28	Washington Federals	Patrick Allen	DB	Utah State
2	29	Pittsburgh Maulers	Don Maggs	T	Tulane
2	30	Pittsburgh Maulers	Doug Hollie	DE	SMU
2	31	Oakland Invaders	Sean McNanie	DE	San Diego State
2	32	Washington Federals	Keith Kidd	WR	Arkansas
2	33	New Orleans Breakers	Mark Schellen	RB	Nebraska
2	34	Chicago Blitz	Mike Russell	LB	Toledo
2	35	Philadelphia Stars	George Jamison	LB	Cincinnati
2	36	Michigan Panthers	Walter Broughton	RB	Jacksonville State
2	37	Los Angeles Express	Gary Zimmerman	G	Oregon
2	38	Oklahoma Outlaws	Norm Granger	RB	Iowa
2	39	San Antonio Gunslingers	Rick Neuheisel	QB	UCLA
2	40	Memphis Showboats	Chris Scott	DT	Purdue
2	41	Houston Gamblers	Rodney Bellinger	DB	Miami (FL)
2	42	Jacksonville Bulls	Ken Hobart	QB	Idaho
3	43	Jacksonville Bulls	Paul Bergmann	TE	UCLA
3	44	Chicago Blitz	Bobby Bell	LB	Missouri
3	45	Memphis Showboats	Ernest Gibson	DB	Furman
3	46	San Antonio Gunslingers	Frank Cephous	RB	UCLA
3	47	Oklahoma Outlaws	John Alt	T	Iowa
3	48	Birmingham Stallions	Taft Sales	LB	Missouri
3	49	Chicago Blitz	Tron Armstrong	WR	Eastern Kentucky
3	50	Washington Federals	Chris Washington	LB	Iowa State
3	51	New Jersey Generals	Lynn Madsen	DT	Washington
3	52	Denver Gold	Todd Shell	LB	BYU
3	53	Los Angeles Express	Derek Kennard	G	Nevada
3	54	Oakland Invaders	Daryl Hart	DB	Lane
3	55	New Jersey Generals	Clarence Collins	WR	Illinois State
3	56	New Orleans Breakers	Johnny Meads	LB	Nicholls State
3	57	Tampa Bay Bandits	Jeff Smith	DB	Missouri
3	58	Michigan Panthers	Kerry Baird	DB	Kentucky
3	59	Philadelphia Stars	R.L. Harris	DB	Stephen F. Austin
3	60	Denver Gold	John Grimsley	LB	Kentucky
3	61	Birmingham Stallions	Phil Boren	T	Arkansas
3	62	Oklahoma Outlaws	Joe Levelis	T	Iowa
3	63	Tampa Bay Bandits	Mark Cannon	C	Texas–Arlington
3	64	Memphis Showboats	Doug West	LB	UCLA
3	65	Houston Gamblers	Glenn Dennison	TE	Miami (FL)
3	66	Philadelphia Stars	Bobby Johnson	WR	Kansas
4	67	Washington Federals	Scott Garnett	DT	Washington
4	68	Denver Gold	Stewart Hill	LB	Washington
4	69	San Antonio Gunslingers	Mitch Willis	DT	SMU
4	70	Washington Federals	Ricky Simmons	WR	Nebraska
4	71	Tampa Bay Bandits	Reggie Smith	T	Kansas
4	72	Denver Gold	Mike Taliferro	DT	TCU
4	73	Oakland Invaders	Rickey Bolden	TE	SMU
4	74	Tampa Bay Bandits	Jay Brophy	LB	Miami (FL)
4	75	Philadelphia Stars	Jim Sandusky	WR	San Diego State
4	76	Washington Federals	Terry Long	G	East Carolina
4	77	Philadelphia Stars	Scott Campbell	QB	Purdue
4	78	Tampa Bay Bandits	Speedy Neal	RB	Miami (FL)
4	79	Jacksonville Bulls	Matt Courtney	DB	Idaho State
4	80	Michigan Panthers	Steve Hamilton	DE	East Carolina
4	81	Memphis Showboats	Hal Stephens	LB	East Carolina
4	82	Chicago Blitz	James King	T	Western Kentucky
4	83	Oklahoma Outlaws	Dwayne Pittman	RB	Arkansas State
4	84	Pittsburgh Maulers	Mark MacDonald	T	Boston College
5	85	Philadelphia Stars	George Radachowsky	DB	Boston College
5	86	Oklahoma Outlaws	John Goode	TE	Youngstown State
5	87	San Antonio Gunslingers	Andre Hardy	RB	Saint Mary's (CA)
5	88	Memphis Showboats	Richard Dukes	DB	Western Carolina
5	89	Washington Federals	Nakita Robertson	RB	Central Arkansas
5	90	Oakland Invaders	Mitch Callahan	DT	Arizona State
5	91	Los Angeles Express	Tony Zendejas	K	Nevada
5	92	Washington Federals	Sean Jones	DE	Northeastern
5	93	Oklahoma Outlaws	Milt Myers	QB	Whitworth
5	94	Michigan Panthers	Bobby Futrell	DB	Elizabeth City State
5	95	Los Angeles Express	Frank Seurer	QB	Kansas
5	96	Oakland Invaders	Thomas Carter	LB	San Diego State
5	97	Michigan Panthers	Jason Jacobs	RB	Iowa State
5	98	New Orleans Breakers	Stacy Rayfield	DB	Texas–Arlington
5	99	Tampa Bay Bandits	Kevin Ingram	QB	East Carolina
5	100	Arizona Wranglers	Jimmy Smith	RB	Elon
5	101	Philadelphia Stars	Andy Parker	TE	Utah
5	102	Michigan Panthers	Reggie Singletary	DT	NC State
5	103	Jacksonville Bulls	Carl Qualls	LB	Idaho State
5	104	Houston Gamblers	Turner Gill	QB	Nebraska
5	105	Memphis Showboats	Joe Carter	RB	Alabama
5	106	Tampa Bay Bandits	Mike Newton	RB	Austin Peay
5	107	Oklahoma Outlaws	Rufus Stevens	WR	Grambling State
5	108	Pittsburgh Maulers	Sam Slater	T	Weber State
6	109	Washington Federals	Joel Hilgenberg	C	Iowa
6	110	Washington Federals	Clint Harris	DB	East Carolina
6	111	Oakland Invaders	Steve Pelluer	QB	Washington
6	112	Birmingham Stallions	Dennis Woodberry	DB	Southern Arkansas
6	113	Los Angeles Express	Kirk Dodge	LB	UNLV
6	114	Michigan Panthers	Vito McKeever	DB	Florida
6	115	Oakland Invaders	Eric Jordan	RB	Purdue
6	116	Tampa Bay Bandits	Paul Gray	LB	Western Kentucky
6	117	Arizona Wranglers	Dean Steinkuhler	G	Nebraska
6	118	Birmingham Stallions	Renny Atkins	G	Kansas
6	119	Philadelphia Stars	Mike McInnis	DE	Arkansas–Pine Bluff
6	120	Washington Federals	Duane Gunn	WR	Indiana
6	121	Pittsburgh Maulers	Ed Martin	LB	Indiana State
6	122	Oklahoma Outlaws	Alvin Powell	G	Winston-Salem State
6	123	San Antonio Gunslingers	Ricky Turner	QB	Washington State
6	124	Memphis Showboats	Tom Andrews	T	Louisville
6	125	Houston Gamblers	Paul Fairchild	G	Kansas
6	126	Jacksonville Bulls	Chuck McCurley	TE	North Alabama
7	127	Jacksonville Bulls	Rusty Towery	QB	North Alabama
7	128	Houston Gamblers	Tony Fitzpatrick	DT	Miami (FL)
7	129	Memphis Showboats	Gary Bridges	DB	Eastern Illinois
7	130	Arizona Wranglers	Dan Ralph	DT	Oregon
7	131	Denver Gold	Arnold Garron	DB	New Hampshire
7	132	Pittsburgh Maulers	Ronnie Landry	RB	McNeese State
7	133	Chicago Blitz	Mel Gray	RB	Purdue
7	134	New Orleans Breakers	Leroy Howell	DE	Appalachian State
7	135	Birmingham Stallions	Robert Williams	DB	Eastern Illinois
7	136	Washington Federals	Lawrence Green	LB	Chattanooga
7	137	Los Angeles Express	Bruce Reimers	G	Iowa State
7	138	Oakland Invaders	John Thomas	DB	TCU
7	139	Philadelphia Stars	John Witkowski	QB	Columbia
7	140	New Orleans Breakers	John Farley	RB	Sacramento State
7	141	Tampa Bay Bandits	Randy Jenkins	QB	Kentucky
7	142	Birmingham Stallions	Milton Fields	LB	Arkansas
7	143	Philadelphia Stars	John Dorsey	LB	UConn
7	144	Michigan Panthers	Anthony Corley	RB	Nevada
7	145	Pittsburgh Maulers	Don Corbin	T	Kentucky
7	146	New Orleans Breakers	Phil Sutton	DB	Minnesota
7	147	San Antonio Gunslingers	Brian O'Meara	T	SMU
7	148	Memphis Showboats	Ted Rosnagle	DB	Portland State
7	149	Houston Gamblers	Craig White	WR	Missouri
7	150	Jacksonville Bulls	Hardis Johnson	WR	Florida State
8	151	Denver Gold	Dean Hagum	DT	Mesa State
8	152	Chicago Blitz	Donnell Daniel	DB	Southern Illinois
8	153	New Jersey Generals	Tom Bertoldi	QB	Northern Michigan
8	154	Denver Gold	Steve Wilburn	DE	Illinois State
8	155	Los Angeles Express	Gordon Hudson	TE	BYU
8	156	Arizona Wranglers	Louis Lipps	WR	Southern Miss
8	157	Oakland Invaders	Bernard Carvalho	G	Hawaii
8	158	Tampa Bay Bandits	Dean Browning	DT	Washington
8	159	Memphis Showboats	Carlton Gunn	DE	Carson–Newman
8	160	Michigan Panthers	Ken O'Neal	TE	Idaho State
8	161	Philadelphia Stars	Otto Kelly	RB	Nevada
8	162	Oakland Invaders	Steve Raquet	DE	Holy Cross
8	163	Jacksonville Bulls	Curtis Hobbs	WR	Nicholls State
8	164	Arizona Wranglers	Charlie Flager	G	Washington State
8	165	Denver Gold	Bob Biestek	RB	Boston College
8	166	San Antonio Gunslingers	Raymond Morris	LB	UTEP
8	167	Oklahoma Outlaws	Ernie Carswell	DB	Alabama State
8	168	Pittsburgh Maulers	Bruce Kallmeyer	K	Kansas
9	169	Pittsburgh Maulers	Rob Swanke	DT	Boston College
9	170	Oklahoma Outlaws	Mike Nease	T	Chattanooga
9	171	San Antonio Gunslingers	Bobby Craighead	RB	Northeast Louisiana
9	172	Denver Gold	David Archer	QB	Iowa State
9	173	Houston Gamblers	Billy Jackson	LB	Mississippi State
9	174	Jacksonville Bulls	Kirk Pendleton	WR	BYU
9	175	Chicago Blitz	Paul McFadden	K	Youngstown State
9	176	Chicago Blitz	Dean May	QB	Louisville
9	177	New Jersey Generals	Scott Etzel	C	Northern Iowa
9	178	New Orleans Breakers	Mark Smythe	DT	Indiana
9	179	Los Angeles Express	Tommy Norman	WR	Jackson State
9	180	Philadelphia Stars	Dave Piepkorn	G	North Dakota State
9	181	Birmingham Stallions	Keith Cathion	WR	Virginia Union
9	182	Memphis Showboats	Leonard Williams	RB	Western Carolina
9	183	Tampa Bay Bandits	Theo Windham	DB	Utah State
9	184	Arizona Wranglers	Randy Johnson	RB	Texas–Arlington
9	185	Philadelphia Stars	Steve Baack	DE	Oregon
9	186	Michigan Panthers	Willie Green	DE	Mississippi Valley State
9	187	Jacksonville Bulls	Aaron Smith	LB	Utah State
9	188	Houston Gamblers	Brian Salonen	TE	Montana
9	189	Memphis Showboats	Randy Wright	QB	Wisconsin
9	190	San Antonio Gunslingers	Gary Hoffman	T	Santa Clara
9	191	Oklahoma Outlaws	Clarence McDade	LB	SMU
9	192	Pittsburgh Maulers	Jay Carroll	TE	Minnesota
10	193	Oakland Invaders	Niko Noga	LB	Hawaii
10	195	New Jersey Generals	Mark Casale	QB	Montclair State
10	197	Los Angeles Express	Michael Carter	DT	SMU
10	198	Birmingham Stallions	Mike Landrum	TE	Southern Miss
10	199	Washington Federals	Waymon Hamilton	RB	BYU
10	200	Tampa Bay Bandits	Scott Shockley	T	Missouri
10	201	New Orleans Breakers	Frank Roberts	C	Tulane
10	202	New Jersey Generals	Harper Howell	TE	UCLA
10	203	Houston Gamblers	Ben Wise	LB	SMU
10	204	Denver Gold	Brian Pillman	LB	Miami (OH)
10	205	Pittsburgh Maulers	Dwayne Massey	T	Southern Miss
10	206	Oklahoma Outlaws	Pat Hauser	G	Cal State Northridge
10	207	San Antonio Gunslingers	Eddie Phillips	RB	Iowa
10	208	Memphis Showboats	John Robertson	T	East Carolina
10	209	Arizona Wranglers	Eddie Williams	DB	Miami (FL)
10	210	Jacksonville Bulls	Elvis Patterson	DB	Kansas
11	211	Jacksonville Bulls	Perry Kemp	WR	California (PA)
11	212	Houston Gamblers	Tim Galloway	DB	Holy Cross
11	213	Memphis Showboats	Doug Herrmann	DT	Nebraska
11	214	San Antonio Gunslingers	Craig White	DB	Minnesota
11	215	Oklahoma Outlaws	Keith Griffin	RB	Miami (FL)
11	216	Pittsburgh Maulers	Jim Byrne	DT	Wisconsin–La Crosse
11	217	Los Angeles Express	K.C. Brown	G	Kansas
11	218	Washington Federals	Kyle Mackey	QB	East Texas State
11	219	Denver Gold	Brian Holland	RB	Arizona
11	220	Chicago Blitz	Michel Bourgeau	DE	Boise State
11	221	Los Angeles Express	Kerwin Bell	RB	Kansas
11	222	Oakland Invaders	Derrick Batiste	DB	McNeese State
11	223	Washington Federals	L.E. Madison	LB	Kansas State
11	224	Arizona Wranglers	Rick Mallory	G	Washington
11	225	Tampa Bay Bandits	Kevin McClelland	LB	Kentucky
11	226	Michigan Panthers	Chris Jensen	WR	Lake Forest
11	227	Philadelphia Stars	Kenny Page	DE	UCLA
11	228	New Jersey Generals	Henry Koontz	RB	Mississippi State
11	229	Pittsburgh Maulers	Glenn Bates	DB	Marshall
11	230	Oklahoma Outlaws	Al Rickey Edwards	RB	Mississippi State
11	231	San Antonio Gunslingers	Everette Todd	DE	Rice
11	232	Memphis Showboats	Lawrence Lee	RB	Kentucky
11	233	Houston Gamblers	Dennis Rogan	RB	Weber State
11	234	Jacksonville Bulls	Tony Shaw	DB	Nevada
12	235	Washington Federals	Dave Moritz	WR	Iowa
12	236	New Orleans Breakers	Fred Fernandes	WR	Utah State
12	237	New Jersey Generals	Tim Cutts	P	Mississippi State
12	238	Denver Gold	Lamar Windham	RB	Mississippi State
12	239	Los Angeles Express	Mark Gardner	G	Hawaii
12	240	New Jersey Generals	Matt Long	C	San Diego State
12	241	Oakland Invaders	Mike Jones	RB	North Carolina A&T
12	242	Tampa Bay Bandits	Steve Carter	WR	Albany State
12	243	Michigan Panthers	Russ Hedderly	LB	Kent State
12	244	Chicago Blitz	Randy Rasmussen	G	Minnesota
12	245	Philadelphia Stars	Marvin Jackson	DB	Utah State
12	246	Michigan Panthers	Rick Naylor	LB	Notre Dame
12	247	Memphis Showboats	Mark Catano	T	Valdosta State
12	248	Houston Gamblers	Bruce Kozerski	T	Holy Cross
12	249	Memphis Showboats	Jeff Tootle	LB	Mesa State
12	250	San Antonio Gunslingers	Jesse Garcia	K	Northeast Louisiana
12	251	Oklahoma Outlaws	Steve Seman	G	Idaho
12	252	Pittsburgh Maulers	Demosthenes Christie	G	Morgan State
13	253	Pittsburgh Maulers	Felix McDowell	TE	East Texas State
13	254	Oklahoma Outlaws	Scott Gordon	T	UCLA
13	255	San Antonio Gunslingers	Chris Jackson	C	SMU
13	256	Memphis Showboats	Steve Gemza	T	UCLA
13	257	Houston Gamblers	Ron Motton	G	Nicholls State
13	258	Jacksonville Bulls	Mike Eddo	WR	BYU
13	259	Memphis Showboats	George Green	DB	Western Carolina
13	260	Memphis Showboats	Eddie Simmons	LB	Kansas
13	261	New Jersey Generals	Mitchell Bennett	WR	Lamar
13	262	Denver Gold	David Windham	LB	Jackson State
13	263	Los Angeles Express	Dee Monson	DT	Nevada
13	264	Oakland Invaders	Andre Mosely	DB	North Texas State
13	265	Birmingham Stallions	Walter Hawkins	DB	Missouri
13	266	New Orleans Breakers	Terry Cole	DE	Illinois
13	267	Tampa Bay Bandits	Tom McCormick	C	Florida State
13	268	Arizona Wranglers	Mike Saxon	P	San Diego State
13	269	Philadelphia Stars	Mike Guendling	LB	Northwestern
13	270	Jacksonville Bulls	Jay Pennison	C	Nicholls State
13	271	Michigan Panthers	Mark Jenkins	G	Cincinnati
13	272	Houston Gamblers	Shawn Rogers	RB	UC Davis
13	273	Memphis Showboats	Doug Wilkening	RB	Nebraska
13	274	San Antonio Gunslingers	Kent Townsend	DE	Baylor
13	275	Birmingham Stallions	Larry Curtis	DT	Virginia Union
13	276	Pittsburgh Maulers	Less Browne	DB	Colorado State
14	277	Washington Federals	Joe Hayes	RB	Central State (OK)
14	278	Memphis Showboats	Larry Gunter	DT	Lenoir Rhyne
14	279	New Jersey Generals	John Preston	DB	Central State (OK)
14	280	Denver Gold	Tom Jelesky	T	Purdue
14	281	Los Angeles Express	Casey Tiumalu	RB	BYU
14	282	Birmingham Stallions	Fletcher Louallen	DB	Livingston
14	283	Tampa Bay Bandits	Mike Hufford	T	Iowa
14	284	New Orleans Breakers	Joe Taylor	DB	Washington State
14	285	Michigan Panthers	Cedric Anderson	WR	Ohio State
14	286	Philadelphia Stars	Duan Hanks	WR	Stephen F. Austin
14	287	Oakland Invaders	Tom Grogan	QB	Iowa
14	288	Michigan Panthers	Shaun Gayle	DB	Ohio State
14	289	Pittsburgh Maulers	Gary Schofield	QB	Wake Forest
14	290	Oklahoma Outlaws	Daryl James	RB	Yankton
14	291	San Antonio Gunslingers	Ricky Davis	DB	West Texas State
14	292	Memphis Showboats	John Daly	WR	Dartmouth
14	293	Houston Gamblers	Tom Hornof	G	Missouri
14	294	Jacksonville Bulls	Tony Johnson	WR	Florida State
15	295	Jacksonville Bulls	Donald Thomas	DB	Tulane
15	296	Houston Gamblers	Daric Zeno	WR	Central State (OK)
15	297	Memphis Showboats	Robert Turner	DB	James Madison
15	298	San Antonio Gunslingers	Danny Buzzard	G	Texas Tech
15	299	Oklahoma Outlaws	Greg Kragen	DT	Utah State
15	300	Pittsburgh Maulers	Wayne Smith	WR	Tulane
15	301	New Jersey Generals	Reese Freeman	DT	Northern Colorado
15	302	Michigan Panthers	Linnie Patrick	RB	Alabama
15	303	New Jersey Generals	Jeff Spek	TE	San Diego State
15	304	Denver Gold	Mike Wells	TE	San Diego State
15	305	Los Angeles Express	Dennis Williams	T	Chattanooga
15	306	Philadelphia Stars	Rob Porter	DB	Holy Cross
15	307	Birmingham Stallions	Al Del Greco	K	Auburn
15	308	New Orleans Breakers	Emerson Brown	RB	Cameron
15	309	Tampa Bay Bandits	Mike Herrington	DE	Wisconsin
15	310	Memphis Showboats	Melvin Dorsey	RB	Western Carolina
15	311	Houston Gamblers	Rodney Brown	DB	Central Arkansas
15	312	Memphis Showboats	Sam Seale	WR	Western State (CO)
15	313	Pittsburgh Maulers	Larry Davis	RB	Luther
15	314	Oklahoma Outlaws	Brian Allen	WR	Idaho
15	315	San Antonio Gunslingers	Jim Kalafat	LB	Montana State
15	316	Memphis Showboats	Steve Harter	T	Mount Union
15	317	Houston Gamblers	Rayford Cooks	DE	North Texas State
15	318	Jacksonville Bulls	Roy Bennett	DB	Jackson State
16	319	Washington Federals	David Charpia	QB	Furman
16	320	Memphis Showboats	Eddie White	TE	Arkansas
16	321	New Jersey Generals	Dan McQuaid	T	UNLV
16	322	New Orleans Breakers	Rex Burningham	T	BYU
16	323	Los Angeles Express	Ivan Lesnik	DT	Arizona
16	324	Birmingham Stallions	Greg Shipp	DB	Southern Illinois
16	325	Birmingham Stallions	Rod Brooks	DB	North Alabama
16	326	Tampa Bay Bandits	Bill Booze	WR	Cincinnati
16	327	Denver Gold	Brian Brennan	WR	Boston College
16	328	Arizona Wranglers	Daryl Nichols	LB	Grambling State
16	329	Philadelphia Stars	Vince Albritton	DB	Washington
16	330	Oakland Invaders	Ed Rhone	DE	Oregon
16	331	Jacksonville Bulls	Steve Harper	TE	BYU
16	332	Houston Gamblers	Todd Fowler	TE	Stephen F. Austin
16	333	Memphis Showboats	Willie Henderson	WR	Central State (OK)
16	334	San Antonio Gunslingers	Mark Jackson	DB	Abilene Christian
16	335	Oklahoma Outlaws	Jeff England	G	Southern Colorado
16	336	Pittsburgh Maulers	Kurt Vestman	TE	Idaho
17	337	Pittsburgh Maulers	Brandon Flint	DT	BYU
17	338	Oklahoma Outlaws	Derrick Harmon	RB	Cornell
17	339	San Antonio Gunslingers	Reginald Cottingham	DB	TCU
17	340	Memphis Showboats	Ralph Battle	DB	Jacksonville State
17	341	Houston Gamblers	Emmanuel Cole	DT	Toledo
17	342	Jacksonville Bulls	Dan Lynch	G	Washington State
17	343	Memphis Showboats	Mark Weiler	LB	Indiana
17	344	Birmingham Stallions	Jay Wilson	LB	Missouri
17	345	New Jersey Generals	Dan Errico	DB	Rutgers
17	346	Denver Gold	Bill Johnson	RB	Arkansas State
17	347	Los Angeles Express	Bruce Green	LB	Texas Southern
17	348	Oakland Invaders	Mel Tucker	RB	Toledo
17	349	Birmingham Stallions	Jim Brown	TE	Southern Miss
17	350	New Orleans Breakers	Jeff Reyes	DE	Utah
17	351	Tampa Bay Bandits	Scott Ryerson	K	UCF
17	352	Michigan Panthers	Kurt Kapischke	T	Augustana (IL)
17	353	Philadelphia Stars	Eddie Stinnett	RB	BYU
17	354	Michigan Panthers	Carlton Rose	LB	Michigan
17	355	Jacksonville Bulls	Rich Roche	LB	Syracuse
17	356	Houston Gamblers	Clarence Verdin	WR	Southwestern Louisiana
17	357	Memphis Showboats	Alan Neal	LB	South Carolina State
17	358	San Antonio Gunslingers	John Morgan	G	Texas–Arlington
17	359	Oklahoma Outlaws	Mike Caterbone	WR	Franklin & Marshall
17	360	Pittsburgh Maulers	Greg Kelley	LB	Southern Miss
18	361	Washington Federals	Horace Pendergass	DB	Elizabeth City State
18	362	Memphis Showboats	Mike Grant	LB	East Carolina
18	363	New Jersey Generals	Jim Dumont	LB	Rutgers
18	364	New Jersey Generals	Al Williams	WR	Nevada
18	365	Los Angeles Express	Don Brown	LB	Defiance
18	366	Birmingham Stallions	Tom Moore	DB	Vanderbilt
18	367	Oakland Invaders	Leroy Lutu	TE	Washington
18	368	Tampa Bay Bandits	Glenn Tillery	WR	Duke
18	369	New Orleans Breakers	Gaylord Paul	DB	Southwestern Louisiana
18	370	Denver Gold	Willis Ray Mackey	RB	Oklahoma
18	371	Philadelphia Stars	Curt Thomas	WR	Missouri
18	372	Michigan Panthers	Gardner Williams	DB	Saint Mary's (CA)
18	373	Birmingham Stallions	Sylvester Stamps	RB	Jackson State
18	374	Oklahoma Outlaws	Dell Walker	RB	East Stroudsburg
18	375	San Antonio Gunslingers	Matt Harlien	T	Texas Tech
18	376	Memphis Showboats	Chris Nicholson	DT	Eastern Illinois
18	377	Houston Gamblers	Nate Mason	QB	Nebraska
18	378	Jacksonville Bulls	Dave Retherford	WR	Purdue
19	379	Jacksonville Bulls	Ken Roe	LB	Florida State
19	380	Houston Gamblers	Bob Seccareccia	T	Rhode Island
19	381	Memphis Showboats	Billy Risher	WR	Furman
19	382	San Antonio Gunslingers	Orson Weems	T	Arkansas
19	383	Oklahoma Outlaws	Kevin Dixon	TE	Southern Oregon
19	384	Pittsburgh Maulers	Dave Skudenski	DT	Fort Lewis
19	385	Memphis Showboats	Alan Reid	RB	Minnesota
19	386	Washington Federals	Paul Peterson	QB	Idaho State
19	387	New Jersey Generals	Eddie Hornback	DE	Mississippi State
19	388	Denver Gold	Marty Louthan	QB	Air Force
19	389	Los Angeles Express	Rodney Webster	RB	Boise State
19	390	Oakland Invaders	Keith James	WR	North Carolina A&T
19	391	Birmingham Stallions	Joe Spivak	G	Illinois State
19	392	Philadelphia Stars	Jon Young	DB	BYU
19	393	Los Angeles Express	Lance Dodson	T	Washington
19	394	Michigan Panthers	Eric Mack	TE	Kansas State
19	395	Philadelphia Stars	Jeff Chaffin	DE	UCLA
19	396	Michigan Panthers	Michael Wade	WR	Iowa State
19	397	Pittsburgh Maulers	Mark Bauer	T	Drake
19	398	Philadelphia Stars	Chris Marler	T	Louisiana Tech
19	399	San Antonio Gunslingers	Bert Zinamon	LB	Arkansas
19	400	Denver Gold	Joe Hines	DT	Penn State
19	401	Houston Gamblers	Trent Collins	DB	San Diego State
19	402	Jacksonville Bulls	John McLean	LB	Florida State

== Supplemental draft ==
Round	Pick #	USFL Team	Player	Position	College
20	1	Philadelphia Stars	Willie Harris	DB	North Carolina
20	2	Oakland Invaders	Don Holmes	WR	Mesa State
20	3	Washington Federals	Alvin Kidd	RB	Mississippi College
