= 1984 USFL territorial draft =

General information
- Date: January 4, 1984
- Location: The Roosevelt Hotel, New York

Overview
- League: USFL

The 1984 USFL territorial draft was the second territorial draft of the United States Football League (USFL). It took place on January 4, 1984, at the Roosevelt Hotel in New York. It included six new expansion teams.

== Player selections ==
= All-Star
= USFL MVP

USFL team	Player	Position	College
Arizona Wranglers	Brad Anderson	WR	Arizona
Arizona Wranglers	Leo Barker	LB	New Mexico State
Arizona Wranglers	Chris Brewer	RB	Arizona
Arizona Wranglers	Mike Cade	RB	Arizona State
Arizona Wranglers	Jimmie Carter	LB	New Mexico
Arizona Wranglers	Marsharne Graves	T	Arizona
Arizona Wranglers	Todd Hons	QB	Arizona State
Arizona Wranglers	Ricky Hunley	LB	Arizona
Arizona Wranglers	John Kaiser	LB	Arizona
Arizona Wranglers	Don Kern	TE	Arizona State
Arizona Wranglers	James Keyton	T	Arizona State
Arizona Wranglers	Pete Mandley	WR	Northern Arizona
Arizona Wranglers	Byron Nelson	T	Arizona
Arizona Wranglers	Sandy Osiecki	QB	Arizona State
Arizona Wranglers	Randy Robbins	DB	Arizona
Arizona Wranglers	Brad Rowland	DE	Northern Arizona
Arizona Wranglers	Tom Tunnicliffe	QB	Arizona
Arizona Wranglers	Mike White	T	Arizona State
Arizona Wranglers	Dwaine Wright	RB	Arizona State
Arizona Wranglers	Fredd Young	LB	New Mexico State
Birmingham Stallions	Pat Arrington	OT	Auburn
Birmingham Stallions	Dowe Aughtman	NG	Auburn
Birmingham Stallions	Zach Barnes	DT	Alabama State
Birmingham Stallions	Jesse Bendross	WR	Alabama
Birmingham Stallions	Chuck Clanton	DB	Auburn
Birmingham Stallions	Randy Edwards	DT	Alabama
Birmingham Stallions	Joe Hall	DB	Mississippi
Birmingham Stallions	Donnie Humphrey	DT	Auburn
Birmingham Stallions	Lionel James	RB	Auburn
Birmingham Stallions	Joey Jones	WR	Alabama
Birmingham Stallions	David Jordan	T	Auburn
Birmingham Stallions	Walter Lewis	QB	Alabama
Birmingham Stallions	Buford McGee	RB	Mississippi
Birmingham Stallions	Malcolm Simmons	P	Alabama
Birmingham Stallions	Doug Smith	DT	Auburn
Birmingham Stallions	Andre Townsend	DT	Mississippi
Birmingham Stallions	Ed West	TE	Auburn
Birmingham Stallions	Quency Williams	DE	Auburn
Birmingham Stallions	Chris Woods	WR	Auburn
Chicago Blitz	Carl Aikens Jr.	WR	Northern Illinois
Chicago Blitz	Greg Bell	RB	Notre Dame
Chicago Blitz	Dwight Beverly	RB	Illinois
Chicago Blitz	Scott Bolzan	T	Northern Illinois
Chicago Blitz	Ed Brady	LB	Illinois
Chicago Blitz	Tim Brewster	TE	Illinois
Chicago Blitz	Mitchell Brookins	WR	Illinois
Chicago Blitz	Chris Brown	DB	Notre Dame
Chicago Blitz	Mark Butkus	LB	Illinois
Chicago Blitz	Archie Carter	LB	Illinois
Chicago Blitz	Ricky Edwards	RB	Northwestern
Chicago Blitz	Clint Haynes	LB	Illinois
Chicago Blitz	Mike Johnson	DE	Illinois
Chicago Blitz	John Kidd	P	Northwestern
Chicago Blitz	Blair Kiel	QB	Notre Dame
Chicago Blitz	Neil Maune	G	Notre Dame
Chicago Blitz	Mike Shiner	T	Notre Dame
Chicago Blitz	Don Thorp	DT	Illinois
Chicago Blitz	Stacey Toran	DB	Notre Dame
Chicago Blitz	Tim Tyrrell	QB	Northern Illinois
Denver Gold	Sandy Armstrong	LB	Colorado
Denver Gold	Adrian Baker	RB	West Texas A&M
Denver Gold	Kevin Call	T	Colorado State
Denver Gold	Jeff Champine	WR	Colorado State
Denver Gold	Curt Cole	TE	Texas Tech
Denver Gold	Stan David	DB	Texas Tech
Denver Gold	Jeff Donaldson	DB	Colorado
Denver Gold	Jeff Harper	LB	Colorado State
Denver Gold	Leonard Harris	WR	Texas Tech
Denver Gold	Dave Hestera	TE	Colorado
Denver Gold	Norman Hill	LB	Texas Tech
Denver Gold	Terry Irvin	LB	Colorado
Denver Gold	Chris Kolodziejski	TE	Wyoming
Denver Gold	Terry Nugent	QB	Colorado State
Denver Gold	Vince Rafferty	DE	Colorado
Denver Gold	Joe Ramunno	G	Wyoming
Denver Gold	Billy Record	WR	West Texas A&M
Denver Gold	Clyde Riggins	DB	Colorado
Denver Gold	Victor Scott	DB	Colorado
Denver Gold	Jack Weil	P	Wyoming
Houston Gamblers	Fred Acorn	DB	Texas
Houston Gamblers	Mark Adickes	T	Baylor
Houston Gamblers	Mike Buchannan	DE	Texas
Houston Gamblers	Jerry Bullitt	LB	Texas A&M
Houston Gamblers	Rod Clark	DE	Texas State
Houston Gamblers	Mike Dunn	DB	Texas State
Houston Gamblers	Jeff Fuller	LB	Texas A&M
Houston Gamblers	Keith Guthrie	DT	Texas A&M
Houston Gamblers	Van Hughes	DT	Texas State
Houston Gamblers	Boyd Jones	T	Texas Southern
Houston Gamblers	David Jones	C	Texas
Houston Gamblers	Don Jones	WR	Texas A&M
Houston Gamblers	Loyd Lewis	DE	Texas A&M-Kingsville
Houston Gamblers	Eugene Lockhart	LB	Houston
Houston Gamblers	Rick McIvor	QB	Texas
Houston Gamblers	Bobby Micho	TE	Texas
Houston Gamblers	Ken Peters	TE	Houston
Houston Gamblers	Allen Rice	RB	Baylor
Houston Gamblers	Dave Roberson	WR	Houston
Houston Gamblers	Tommy Robison	T	Texas A&M
Houston Gamblers	Mike Ruether	C	Texas
Houston Gamblers	Ricky Sanders	WR	Texas State
Houston Gamblers	Adam Schreiber	G	Texas
Houston Gamblers	Adrian Simpson	DB	Texas State
Houston Gamblers	Casey Smith	T	Texas
Houston Gamblers	John Walker	RB	Texas
Houston Gamblers	Dale Walters	P	Rice
Houston Gamblers	Jimmie Williams	WR	Texas A&M
Houston Gamblers	Lionel Wilson	QB	Houston
Houston Gamblers	Ray Woodard	DT	Texas
Jacksonville Bulls	Ben Bennett	QB	Duke
Jacksonville Bulls	James Brown	G	Georgia
Jacksonville Bulls	Nat Brown	DB	North Carolina State
Jacksonville Bulls	Neal Cambridge	WR	Morris Brown
Jacksonville Bulls	Ronny Cone	RB	Georgia Tech
Jacksonville Bulls	Charlie Dean	DB	Georgia
Jacksonville Bulls	Phil Ebinger	C	Duke
Jacksonville Bulls	Michael Flagg	DE	Morris Brown
Jacksonville Bulls	Chet Gee	DB	Duke
Jacksonville Bulls	Freddie Gilbert	DE	Georgia
Jacksonville Bulls	Warren Gray	G	Georgia
Jacksonville Bulls	Derek Gwinn	G	Georgia Tech
Jacksonville Bulls	Jimmy Harper	T	Georgia
Jacksonville Bulls	Andy Hendel	LB	North Carolina State
Jacksonville Bulls	Terry Hoage	DB	Georgia
Jacksonville Bulls	Winford Hood	T	Georgia
Jacksonville Bulls	Vaughan Johnson	LB	North Carolina State
Jacksonville Bulls	Daryll Jones	DB	Georgia
Jacksonville Bulls	Clarence Kay	TE	Georgia
Jacksonville Bulls	Jerome Ley	DT	Duke
Jacksonville Bulls	Kelly Lowrey	QB	Florida State
Jacksonville Bulls	Guy McIntyre	T	Georgia
Jacksonville Bulls	Ron Rice	K	Georgia Tech
Jacksonville Bulls	Melvin Simmons	RB	Georgia
Jacksonville Bulls	Greg Steele	G	North Carolina State
Jacksonville Bulls	Weegie Thompson	WR	Florida State
Jacksonville Bulls	Tommy Thurson	LB	Georgia
Jacksonville Bulls	Jack Westbrook	DB	Georgia Tech
Jacksonville Bulls	Ken Whisenhunt	TE	Georgia Tech
Jacksonville Bulls	Felix Williams	WR	Morris Brown
Los Angeles Express	Tony Brewer	DB	Southern California
Los Angeles Express	Jeff Brown	LB	Southern California
Los Angeles Express	Keith Browner	LB	Southern California
Los Angeles Express	Fred Cornwell	TE	Southern California
Los Angeles Express	Todd Dillon	QB	Long Beach State
Los Angeles Express	Michael Harper	RB	Southern California
Los Angeles Express	David Howard	LB	Long Beach State
Los Angeles Express	Lionel Manuel	WR	Pacific
Los Angeles Express	Lee Miller	DB	Fullerton State
Los Angeles Express	Lenny Montgomery	RB	Long Beach State
Los Angeles Express	Malcolm Moore	WR	Southern California
Los Angeles Express	John Puzar	C	Long Beach State
Los Angeles Express	Ken Ruettgers	T	Southern California
Los Angeles Express	Rich Sanchez	RB	California Lutheran
Los Angeles Express	Tony Slaton	C	Southern California
Los Angeles Express	Cary Smith	T	Pacific
Los Angeles Express	Todd Spencer	RB	Southern California
Los Angeles Express	Chuck Walker	TE	California Lutheran
Los Angeles Express	Kirby Warren	RB	Pacific
Los Angeles Express	Tom Wilkes	DT	California Lutheran
Memphis Showboats	Steve Bearden	DE	Vanderbilt
Memphis Showboats	John Bond	QB	Mississippi State
Memphis Showboats	Chuck Coleman	RB	Tennessee
Memphis Showboats	Leonard Coleman	DB	Vanderbilt
Memphis Showboats	Derrick Crawford	WR	Memphis
Memphis Showboats	Clyde Duncan	WR	Tennessee
Memphis Showboats	Leon Floyd	WR	Tennessee State
Memphis Showboats	Mike Furnas	G	Tennessee
Memphis Showboats	Smokey Jordan	WR	Memphis
Memphis Showboats	Steve Knight	T	Tennessee
Memphis Showboats	John Matthews	T	Tennessee
Memphis Showboats	Greg Montgomery	DT	Memphis
Memphis Showboats	Randall Morris	RB	Tennessee
Memphis Showboats	Percy Nabors	DB	Memphis
Memphis Showboats	Darrell Nelson	TE	Memphis
Memphis Showboats	Robert O'Connor	LB	Vanderbilt
Memphis Showboats	Russell Phillips	T	Tennessee State
Memphis Showboats	Phil Roach	WR	Vanderbilt
Memphis Showboats	Ken Sample	G	Vanderbilt
Memphis Showboats	David Scandrett	LB	Tennessee
Memphis Showboats	Curt Singer	T	Tennessee
Memphis Showboats	Glenn Streno	C	Tennessee
Memphis Showboats	Mark Studaway	DE	Tennessee
Memphis Showboats	Golden Tate	WR	Tennessee State
Memphis Showboats	Lenny Taylor	WR	Tennessee
Memphis Showboats	William Thomas	DB	Vanderbilt
Memphis Showboats	Willie Twyford	DT	Vanderbilt
Memphis Showboats	Stan Weaver	P	Memphis
Memphis Showboats	Reggie White	DE	Tennessee
Memphis Showboats	Johnny Williams	DT	Tennessee
Memphis Showboats	Cedric Wright	QB	Memphis
Michigan Panthers	Scott Auer	T	Michigan State
Michigan Panthers	Carl Banks	LB	Michigan State
Michigan Panthers	Vince Bean	WR	Michigan
Michigan Panthers	Mike Boren	LB	Michigan
Michigan Panthers	Don Bracken	P	Michigan
Michigan Panthers	Richard Calhoun	RB	Eastern Michigan
Michigan Panthers	Milt Carthens	TE	Michigan
Michigan Panthers	Evan Cooper	DB	Michigan
Michigan Panthers	Darryl Dixon	DB	Michigan State
Michigan Panthers	Tom Dixon	C	Michigan
Michigan Panthers	Shawn Faulkner	RB	Western Michigan
Michigan Panthers	Nate Hannah	DB	Michigan State
Michigan Panthers	Tom Hassel	LB	Michigan
Michigan Panthers	Stefan Humphries	G	Michigan
Michigan Panthers	Demetrius Jones	DB	Western Michigan
Michigan Panthers	John Lott	DB	Michigan
Michigan Panthers	Rod Lyles	LB	Michigan
Michigan Panthers	David Marshall	LB	Eastern Michigan
Michigan Panthers	Steve Smith	QB	Michigan
Michigan Panthers	Daryl Turner	WR	Michigan State
New Jersey Generals	Vaughn Broadnax	RB	Ohio State
New Jersey Generals	Joe Dooley	C	Ohio State
New Jersey Generals	Rich Erenberg	RB	Colgate
New Jersey Generals	Carl Howard	DB	Rutgers
New Jersey Generals	Cookie Jackson	DB	Mississippi State
New Jersey Generals	Kenny Johnson	DB	Mississippi State
New Jersey Generals	Bernard King	LB	Syracuse
New Jersey Generals	Danny Knight	WR	Mississippi State
New Jersey Generals	Garcia Lane	DB	Ohio State
New Jersey Generals	Orlando Lowry	LB	Ohio State
New Jersey Generals	Mike Morini	T	Colgate
New Jersey Generals	Marty Murphy	DE	Colgate
New Jersey Generals	William Roberts	T	Ohio State
New Jersey Generals	Rowland Tatum	LB	Ohio State
New Jersey Generals	Blaise Winter	DE	Syracuse
New Jersey Generals	George Wonsley	RB	Mississippi State
New Jersey Generals	Brent Ziegler	RB	Syracuse
New Orleans Breakers	Jearld Baylis	LB	Southern Mississippi
New Orleans Breakers	Clint Berry	T	Louisiana State
New Orleans Breakers	Jim Boyle	T	Tulane
New Orleans Breakers	Bud Brown	DB	Southern Mississippi
New Orleans Breakers	Garrett Chase	DB	Grambling State
New Orleans Breakers	Alex Clark	DB	Louisiana State
New Orleans Breakers	Eugene Daniel	DB	Louisiana State
New Orleans Breakers	Jon English	QB	Tulane
New Orleans Breakers	Tony Good	RB	Southern University
New Orleans Breakers	Robert Griffin	WR	Tulane
New Orleans Breakers	Glen Howe	T	Southern Mississippi
New Orleans Breakers	Rydell Malancon	LB	Louisiana State
New Orleans Breakers	Bruce Miller	DB	Southern Mississippi
New Orleans Breakers	Mitch Montgomery	TE	Grambling State
New Orleans Breakers	Ed Scott	DB	Grambling State
New Orleans Breakers	Robert Smith	DE	Grambling State
New Orleans Breakers	Clemon Terrell	RB	Southern Mississippi
New Orleans Breakers	Elton Veals	RB	Tulane
New Orleans Breakers	Clint Wenzel	DE	Tulane
New Orleans Breakers	Stephen Wilson	G	Southern University
Oakland Invaders	Kevin Baird	DB	Stanford
Oakland Invaders	Dale Barthel	LB	Cal Poly (San Luis Obispo)
Oakland Invaders	Steve Brown	WR	Stanford
Oakland Invaders	Jim Clymer	TE	Stanford
Oakland Invaders	Sherman Cocroft	DB	San Jose State
Oakland Invaders	Jeff Deaton	T	Stanford
Oakland Invaders	Clyde Glover	DT	Fresno State
Oakland Invaders	Bobby Johnson	RB	San Jose State
Oakland Invaders	David Lewis	TE	California
Oakland Invaders	Greg Loberg	T	California
Oakland Invaders	Randy Pratt	K	California
Oakland Invaders	Henry Ramelli	T	San Jose State
Oakland Invaders	Eric Richardson	WR	San Jose State
Oakland Invaders	Ron Rivera	LB	California
Oakland Invaders	Byron Smith	DT	California
Oakland Invaders	Carl Sullivan	DE	San Jose State
Oakland Invaders	John Sullivan	DB	California
Oakland Invaders	Gene Underwood	DB	Cal Poly (San Luis Obispo)
Oakland Invaders	Clemont Williams	DB	California
Oakland Invaders	Vaughn Williams	DB	Stanford
Oklahoma Outlaws	Cliff Abbott	LB	Tulsa
Oklahoma Outlaws	Ernie Anderson	RB	Oklahoma State
Oklahoma Outlaws	Tom Baldwin	DT	Tulsa
Oklahoma Outlaws	Steve Ballard	DE	Tulsa
Oklahoma Outlaws	Tom Benson	LB	Oklahoma
Oklahoma Outlaws	Rick Bryan	DT	Oklahoma
Oklahoma Outlaws	Scott Case	DB	Oklahoma
Oklahoma Outlaws	John Chesley	TE	Oklahoma State
Oklahoma Outlaws	Dewayne Downing	WR	Oklahoma
Oklahoma Outlaws	Dwight Drane	DB	Oklahoma
Oklahoma Outlaws	James Dunlap	LB	Tulsa
Oklahoma Outlaws	Reuben Eckels	WR	Wichita State
Oklahoma Outlaws	Keith Estes	WR	Tulsa
Oklahoma Outlaws	Rod Fisher	DB	Oklahoma State
Oklahoma Outlaws	Jumpy Geathers	DT	Wichita State
Oklahoma Outlaws	Daryl Goodlow	LB	Oklahoma
Oklahoma Outlaws	John Green	WR	Tulsa
Oklahoma Outlaws	Larry Green	TE	Langston
Oklahoma Outlaws	Michael Gunter	RB	Tulsa
Oklahoma Outlaws	David Hersey	TE	Tulsa
Oklahoma Outlaws	Elwyn Holt	LB	Wichita State
Oklahoma Outlaws	Anthony Jones	TE	Wichita State
Oklahoma Outlaws	Paul Parker	G	Oklahoma
Oklahoma Outlaws	Chris Rockins	DB	Oklahoma State
Oklahoma Outlaws	Jackie Shipp	LB	Oklahoma
Oklahoma Outlaws	Bob Slater	DT	Oklahoma
Oklahoma Outlaws	James Spencer	LB	Oklahoma State
Oklahoma Outlaws	John Truitt	DE	Oklahoma
Oklahoma Outlaws	Brett White	RB	Tulsa
Oklahoma Outlaws	Billy Wilson	DB	Wichita State
Philadelphia Stars	Tyrone Anthony	RB	North Carolina
Philadelphia Stars	Kevin Baugh	WR	Penn State
Philadelphia Stars	Todd Blackledge	QB	Penn State
Philadelphia Stars	Brian Blados	T	North Carolina
Philadelphia Stars	Joe Conwell	T	North Carolina
Philadelphia Stars	William Fuller	DE	North Carolina
Philadelphia Stars	Greg Gattuso	DT	Penn State
Philadelphia Stars	Harry Hamilton	DB	Penn State
Philadelphia Stars	Ron Heller	T	Penn State
Philadelphia Stars	Kenny Jackson	WR	Penn State
Philadelphia Stars	Tom Kilkenny	LB	Temple
Philadelphia Stars	Scott Radecic	LB	Penn State
Philadelphia Stars	George Reynolds	P	Penn State
Philadelphia Stars	Tim Riordan	QB	Temple
Philadelphia Stars	Mark Robinson	DB	Penn State
Philadelphia Stars	Kevin Ross	DB	Temple
Philadelphia Stars	John Shigo	LB	Lehigh
Philadelphia Stars	Mark Smith	WR	North Carolina
Philadelphia Stars	Scott Stankavage	QB	North Carolina
Philadelphia Stars	Jon Williams	RB	Penn State
Pittsburgh Maulers	Tim Agee	DB	West Virginia
Pittsburgh Maulers	Duane Barnes	G	West Virginia
Pittsburgh Maulers	Dwight Collins	WR	Pittsburgh
Pittsburgh Maulers	Mike Dahl	G	Pittsburgh
Pittsburgh Maulers	Tom Flynn	DB	Pittsburgh
Pittsburgh Maulers	John Frank	TE	Ohio State
Pittsburgh Maulers	Steve Hathaway	LB	West Virginia
Pittsburgh Maulers	Troy Hill	DB	Pittsburgh
Pittsburgh Maulers	Rich Hollins	WR	West Virginia
Pittsburgh Maulers	Jeff Hostetler	QB	West Virginia
Pittsburgh Maulers	Mike Johnson	LB	Virginia Tech
Pittsburgh Maulers	Vince Johnson	G	Virginia Tech
Pittsburgh Maulers	Ben Lawrence	T	Indiana (PA)
Pittsburgh Maulers	Bill Maas	DT	Pittsburgh
Pittsburgh Maulers	Tony Magnelli	C	Pittsburgh
Pittsburgh Maulers	David Marvel	LB	Virginia Tech
Pittsburgh Maulers	Joe McCall	RB	Pittsburgh
Pittsburgh Maulers	Jim Merritts	DT	West Virginia
Pittsburgh Maulers	Kenny Moore	DB	Indiana (PA)
Pittsburgh Maulers	Steve Newberry	DB	West Virginia}
Pittsburgh Maulers	Dave Oblak	DT	West Virginia
Pittsburgh Maulers	Kevin Owens	T	Kutztown
Pittsburgh Maulers	Tony Paige	RB	Virginia Tech
Pittsburgh Maulers	James Patterson	DE	Virginia Tech
Pittsburgh Maulers	James Robinson	LB	Virginia Tech
Pittsburgh Maulers	Eric Schubert	K	Pittsburgh
Pittsburgh Maulers	Mike Shaw	TE	Virginia Tech
Pittsburgh Maulers	Alonzo Smith	TE	Virginia Tech
Pittsburgh Maulers	Jim Sweeney	C	Pittsburgh
Pittsburgh Maulers	Ray Weatherspoon	DB	Pittsburgh
Pittsburgh Maulers	Al Wenglikowski	LB	Pittsburgh
San Antonio Gunslingers	Alfred Anderson	RB	Baylor
San Antonio Gunslingers	Ricky Askew	TE	Rice
San Antonio Gunslingers	Mossy Cade	DB	Texas
San Antonio Gunslingers	Billy Cannon Jr.	LB	Texas A&M
San Antonio Gunslingers	Craig Curry	DB	Texas
San Antonio Gunslingers	Bruce Davis	WR	Baylor
San Antonio Gunslingers	Preston Davis	DB	Baylor
San Antonio Gunslingers	Doug Dawson	G	Texas
San Antonio Gunslingers	Robert Durham	LB	Houston
San Antonio Gunslingers	Jitter Fields	DB	Texas
San Antonio Gunslingers	Cyril Friday	LB	Texas State
San Antonio Gunslingers	John Haines	DT	Texas
San Antonio Gunslingers	Eric Holle	DE	Texas
San Antonio Gunslingers	Mark Johnson	G	Baylor
San Antonio Gunslingers	Donald Jordan	RB	Houston
San Antonio Gunslingers	Mark Lang	LB	Texas
San Antonio Gunslingers	Jeff Leiding	LB	Texas
San Antonio Gunslingers	Duane Losack	T	Houston
San Antonio Gunslingers	Dwayne Love	RB	Houston
San Antonio Gunslingers	Mike Luck	RB	Texas
San Antonio Gunslingers	Kirk McJunkin	G	Texas
San Antonio Gunslingers	Gerald McNeil	WR	Baylor
San Antonio Gunslingers	Mark Miller	LB	Texas A&M-Kingsville
San Antonio Gunslingers	Eddie O’Brien	RB	Angelo State
San Antonio Gunslingers	Jeff Paine	LB	Texas A&M
San Antonio Gunslingers	Joel Rios	DT	Rice
San Antonio Gunslingers	Tim Staskus	LB	Texas State
San Antonio Gunslingers	Karl Watson	LB	Texas Southern
San Antonio Gunslingers	Scott Wedell	K	Texas-El Paso
San Antonio Gunslingers	Ed Williams	DE	Texas
Tampa Bay Bandits	Ray Alexander	WR	Florida A&M
Tampa Bay Bandits	John Benson	LB	Florida A&M
Tampa Bay Bandits	John Bostic	DB	Bethune-Cookman
Tampa Bay Bandits	Rufus Brown	T	Florida A&M
Tampa Bay Bandits	Alphonso Carreker	DT	Florida State
Tampa Bay Bandits	Randy Clark	DB	Florida
Tampa Bay Bandits	Dwayne Dixon	WR	Florida
Tampa Bay Bandits	Dewey Forte	DT	Bethune-Cookman
Tampa Bay Bandits	Mike Grayson	RB	Duke
Tampa Bay Bandits	Roy Harris	DT	Florida
Tampa Bay Bandits	John Hunt	OG	Florida
Tampa Bay Bandits	Tony Lilly	DB	Florida
Tampa Bay Bandits	Wilber Marshall	LB	Florida
Tampa Bay Bandits	Fred McCallister	LB	Florida
Tampa Bay Bandits	Mark Militello	WR	Duke
Tampa Bay Bandits	Wilford Morgan	TE	Bethune-Cookman
Tampa Bay Bandits	Wayne Peace	QB	Florida
Tampa Bay Bandits	Reggie Sandilands	WR	Bethune-Cookman
Tampa Bay Bandits	Bruce Vaughan	DB	Florida
Tampa Bay Bandits	Lee Williams	DT	Bethune-Cookman
Washington Federals	Shawn Benson	G	Maryland
Washington Federals	Dom Blasingame	TE	South Carolina
Washington Federals	Ray Brown	DE	Clemson
Washington Federals	Dave D'Addio	RB	Maryland
Washington Federals	Boomer Esiason	QB	Maryland
Washington Federals	James Farr	G	Clemson
Washington Federals	J.D. Fuller	LB	South Carolina
Washington Federals	Rickey Hagood	DT	South Carolina
Washington Federals	Willie Joyner	RB	Maryland
Washington Federals	Pete Koch	DE	Maryland
Washington Federals	Howard Lewis	DB	Virginia
Washington Federals	Kevin Mack	RB	Clemson
Washington Federals	Rod McSwain	DB	Clemson
Washington Federals	Edgar Pickett	DE	Clemson
Washington Federals	James Robinson	DT	Clemson
Washington Federals	Rusty Russell	OT	South Carolina
Washington Federals	Jim Scott	DT	Clemson
Washington Federals	Ron Solt	G	Maryland
Washington Federals	Harry Venezia	T	Maryland
Washington Federals	Quentin Walker	WR	Virginia
