= 1984 NFL supplemental draft of USFL and CFL players =

One-time professional football draft

General information
- Date: June 5, 1984
- Location: New York City

Overview
- 84 total selections in 3 rounds
- League: NFL
- First selection: Steve Young, QB; Tampa Bay Buccaneers
- Most selections (6): Cleveland Browns
- Fewest selections (0): Chicago Bears

The 1984 NFL supplemental draft of USFL and CFL players was a one-time draft of United States Football League (USFL) and Canadian Football League (CFL) players held on June 5, 1984.

While there were a few Hall of Famers and Pro Bowl players in this draft, the quality was generally lower than in the normal annual draft. There were six first round draft picks from this draft (Wayne Peace, Paul Bergmann, Ken Hobart, Allanda Smith, Duanne Gunn and Danny Knight) who never played a game in the NFL. No normal first round draft pick has failed to play in the NFL since Jim Detwiler in 1967.

== Background ==
On June 5, 1984, the National Football League held a draft for college seniors who had already signed with either the USFL or the CFL in an attempt to head off a bidding war in its own ranks for USFL and CFL players. The 28 NFL teams chose 84 players from 224 available during the three-round selection meeting. The draft was for players who would have been eligible for the regular 1984 NFL draft in early May, but had already signed a contract with a USFL or CFL team.

The draft was implemented primarily with the fledgling USFL in mind. The owners did not want to risk potentially "wasting" picks in the regular draft on players who were already signed by another league, but also wanted to ensure there would not be a large influx of free agent talent in case the new league suddenly collapsed. The CFL, being a much more established circuit with strict limits on the number of American players on each team, was not as much of a concern, but was included to shield the NFL from potential antitrust litigation that might have arisen had the league targeted a specific rival with a supplemental draft. Of the 84 players selected, only eight were from the CFL, with 76 from the USFL.

While the Los Angeles Express were a modest 8–7 at the time of the draft, their roster was laden with talent. Future Hall of Famers Steve Young and Gary Zimmerman headlined a group of twenty Express players selected in the draft, including four of the first six selections and eleven in the opening round. (The eventual '84 USFL champs from Philadelphia were second with nine picks; no CFL team had more than two.)

Only one trade involving supplemental draft picks was consummated, as the Cleveland Browns acquired all three of the Chicago Bears' supplemental picks in exchange for the Browns' selections in the final four rounds of the regular 1984 draft. As a result, Cleveland made six selections in this draft (including Pro Bowlers Kevin Mack and Gerald McNeil, both with picks that originally belonged to Chicago) while the Bears made none. The other 26 teams made three selections each.

= Pro Bowler	= Hall of Famer

== Player selections ==
=== First round ===
Pick #	NFL team	Player	Position	Pro team	College
1	Tampa Bay Buccaneers	Steve Young	QB	Los Angeles Express	BYU
2	Houston Oilers	Mike Rozier	RB	Pittsburgh Maulers	Nebraska
3	New York Giants	Gary Zimmerman	G	Los Angeles Express	Oregon
4	Philadelphia Eagles	Reggie White	DE	Memphis Showboats	Tennessee
5	Kansas City Chiefs	Mark Adickes	OT	Los Angeles Express	Baylor
6	San Diego Chargers	Lee Williams	DE	Los Angeles Express	Bethune-Cookman
7	Cincinnati Bengals	Wayne Peace	QB	Tampa Bay Bandits	Florida
8	Indianapolis Colts	Paul Bergmann	TE	Jacksonville Bulls	UCLA
9	Atlanta Falcons	Joey Jones	WR	Birmingham Stallions	Alabama
10	New York Jets	Ken Hobart	QB	Denver Gold	Idaho
11	Cleveland Browns^{(from Chicago Bears)}	Kevin Mack	FB	Los Angeles Express	Clemson
12	Green Bay Packers	Buford Jordan	RB	New Orleans Breakers	McNeese State
13	Minnesota Vikings	Allanda Smith	CB	Los Angeles Express	TCU
14	Buffalo Bills	Dwight Drane	S	Los Angeles Express	Oklahoma
15	New Orleans Saints	Vaughan Johnson	LB	Jacksonville Bulls	North Carolina State
16	New England Patriots	Ricky Sanders	WR	Houston Gamblers	Southwest Texas State
17	St. Louis Cardinals	Mike Ruether	C	Los Angeles Express	Texas
18	Cleveland Browns	Mike Johnson	LB	Philadelphia Stars	Virginia Tech
19	Denver Broncos	Freddie Gilbert	DE	New Jersey Generals	Georgia
20	Detroit Lions	Alphonso Williams	WR	Oklahoma Outlaws	Nevada
21	Los Angeles Rams	William Fuller	DE	Philadelphia Stars	North Carolina
22	Seattle Seahawks	Gordon Hudson	TE	Los Angeles Express	BYU
23	Pittsburgh Steelers	Duane Gunn	WR	Los Angeles Express	Indiana
24	San Francisco 49ers	Derrick Crawford	WR	Memphis Showboats	Memphis
25	Dallas Cowboys	Todd Fowler	TE-RB	Houston Gamblers	Stephen F. Austin
26	Miami Dolphins	Danny Knight	WR	New Jersey Generals	Mississippi State
27	Washington Redskins	Tony Zendejas	K	Los Angeles Express	Nevada
28	Los Angeles Raiders	Christopher Woods	WR	Edmonton Eskimos (CFL)	Auburn

=== Second round ===
Pick #	NFL team	Player	Position	Pro team	College
29	Houston Oilers	Don Maggs	OT	Pittsburgh Maulers	Tulane
30	Tampa Bay Buccaneers	Kevin Nelson	RB	Los Angeles Express	UCLA
31	New York Giants	James Robinson	DT	Los Angeles Express	Clemson
32	Philadelphia Eagles	Daryl Goodlow	LB	Oklahoma Outlaws	Arizona
33	Kansas City Chiefs	Lupe Sanchez	CB	Arizona Wranglers	UCLA
34	San Diego Chargers	Steve Smith	QB	Montreal Concordes (CFL)	Michigan
35	Cincinnati Bengals	Bill Johnson	RB	Denver Gold	Arkansas State
36	Indianapolis Colts	Albert Bentley	RB	Michigan Panthers	Miami (FL)
37	Atlanta Falcons	Michael McInnis	DT	Philadelphia Stars	Arkansas-Pine Bluff
38	New York Jets	Jim Sandusky	WR	British Columbia Lions (CFL)	San Diego State
39	Green Bay Packers	Chuck Clanton	DB	Birmingham Stallions	Auburn
40	Minnesota Vikings	Robert B. Smith	DE	Arizona Wranglers	Grambling
41	Buffalo Bills	Daryl Hart	DB	Oakland Invaders	Lane
42	New Orleans Saints	Mel Gray	RB	Los Angeles Express	Purdue
43	New England Patriots	Eric Jordan	RB	Oakland Invaders	Purdue
44	Cleveland Browns^{(from Chicago Bears)}	Gerald McNeil	WR	Houston Gamblers	Baylor
45	St. Louis Cardinals	Derek Kennard	G	Los Angeles Express	Nevada
46	Denver Broncos	Rick Massie	WR	Calgary Stampeders (CFL)	Kentucky
47	Detroit Lions	George Jamison	LB	Philadelphia Stars	Cincinnati
48	Los Angeles Rams	Rick Johnson	QB	Oklahoma Outlaws	Southern Illinois
49	Seattle Seahwks	Alvin Powell	G	Oklahoma Outlaws	Winston-Salem State
50	Cleveland Browns	Tommy Robison	OT	Houston Gamblers	Texas A&M
51	San Francisco 49ers	Joe Conwell	OT	Philadelphia Stars	North Carolina
52	Pittsburgh Steelers	Tom Dixon	C	Michigan Panthers	Michigan
53	Miami Dolphins	Dewey Forte	DE	Los Angeles Express	Bethune-Cookman
54	Dallas Cowboys	Malcolm Moore	WR	Los Angeles Express	USC
55	Washington Redskins	Gary Clark	WR	Jacksonville Bulls	James Madison
56	Los Angeles Raiders	Stewart Hill	LB	Edmonton Eskimos (CFL)	Washington

=== Third round ===
Pick #	NFL team	Player	Position	Pro team	College
57	Tampa Bay Buccaneers	Alex Clark	DB	New Orleans Breakers	LSU
58	Houston Oilers	Lynn Madsen	DT	New Jersey Generals	Washington
59	New York Giants	Kirby Warren	RB	Los Angeles Express	Pacific
60	Philadelphia Eagles	Thomas Carter	LB	Oakland Invaders	San Diego State
61	Kansas City Chiefs	Garcia Lane	CB	Philadelphia Stars	Ohio State
62	San Diego Chargers	Clarence Collins	WR	New Jersey Generals	Illinois State
63	Atlanta Falcons	Dennis Woodberry	DB	Birmingham Stallions	Southern Arkansas
64	New York Jets	Turner Gill	QB	Montreal Concordes (CFL)	Nebraska
65	Cincinnati Bengals	Tom Kilkenny	LB	Chicago Blitz	Temple
66	Indianapolis Colts	Byron Smith	DT	Saskatchewan Roughriders (CFL)	California
67	Minnesota Vikings	David Howard	LB	Los Angeles Express	Long Beach State
68	Buffalo Bills	Don Corbin	OT	Pittsburgh Maulers	Kentucky
69	New Orleans Saints	Steve Dearden	LB	Memphis Showboats	Vanderbilt
70	New England Patriots	Walter Lewis	QB	Memphis Showboats	Alabama
71	Cleveland Browns ^{(from Chicago Bears)}	Doug West	LB	Jacksonville Bulls	UCLA
72	Green Bay Packers	John Sullivan	DB	Oakland Invaders	California
73	St. Louis Cardinals	Tim Riordan	QB	Philadelphia Stars	Temple
74	Detroit Lions	Doug Hollie	DE	Pittsburgh Maulers	SMU
75	Los Angeles Rams	Jim Byrne	NT	Philadelphia Stars	Wisconsin-LaCrosse
76	Seattle Seahawks	Frank Seurer	QB	Los Angeles Express	Kansas
77	Cleveland Browns	John Bond	QB	Saskatchewan Roughriders (CFL)	Mississippi State
78	Denver Broncos	Reggie Smith	OT	Tampa Bay Bandits	Kansas
79	Pittsburgh Steelers	Phil Boren	OT	Birmingham Stallions	Arkansas
80	San Francisco 49ers	Mark Schellen	RB	New Orleans Breakers	Nebraska
81	Dallas Cowboys	Jeff Spek	TE	New Jersey Generals	San Diego State
82	Miami Dolphins	Duan Hanks	WR	Philadelphia Stars	Stephen F. Austin
83	Washington Redskins	Clarence Verdin	WR	Houston Gamblers	Southwestern Louisiana
84	Los Angeles Raiders	James Farr	G	Washington Federals	Clemson

== Selections by teams ==
Rank	Team	Players selected	League
1	Los Angeles Express	20	USFL
2	Philadelphia Stars	9	USFL
3	Houston Gamblers	5	USFL
3	New Jersey Generals	5	USFL
5	Birmingham Stallions	4	USFL
5	Jacksonville Bulls	4	USFL
5	Memphis Showboats	4	USFL
5	Oakland Invaders	4	USFL
5	Oklahoma Outlaws	4	USFL
5	Pittsburgh Maulers	4	USFL
11	New Orleans Breakers	3	USFL
12	Arizona Wranglers	2	USFL
12	Denver Gold	2	USFL
12	Edmonton Eskimos	2	CFL
12	Michigan Panthers	2	USFL
12	Montreal Concordes	2	CFL
12	Saskatchewan Roughriders	2	CFL
12	Tampa Bay Bandits	2	USFL
19	British Columbia Lions	1	CFL
19	Calgary Stampeders	1	CFL
19	Chicago Blitz	1	USFL
19	Washington Federals	1	USFL
23	Hamilton Tiger-Cats	0	CFL
23	Ottawa Rough Riders	0	CFL
23	San Antonio Gunslingers	0	USFL
23	Toronto Argonauts	0	CFL
23	Winnipeg Blue Bombers	0	CFL

== Hall of Famers ==
- Steve Young, quarterback from the USFL, taken first overall by the Tampa Bay Buccaneers.

Pro Football Hall of Fame, Class of 2005

- Gary Zimmerman, offensive tackle from the USFL, taken third overall by the New York Giants.

Pro Football Hall of Fame, Class of 2008

- Reggie White, defensive end from the USFL, taken fourth overall by the Philadelphia Eagles.

Pro Football Hall of Fame, Class of 2006

== See also ==
- 1984 USFL draft
- 1984 USFL territorial draft
