= 1983 All-Pacific-10 Conference football team =

The 1983 All-Pacific-10 Conference football team consists of American football players chosen by various organizations for All-Pacific-10 Conference teams for the 1983 college football season.

== Offensive selections ==
=== Quarterbacks ===
- Steve Pelluer, Washington (Coaches-1)
- Tom Tunnicliffe, Arizona (Coaches-2)

=== Running backs ===
- Kevin Nelson, UCLA (Coaches-1)
- Bryce Oglesby, Oregon St. (Coaches-1)
- Kerry Porter, Washington St. (Coaches-1)
- Darryl Clack, Arizona St. (Coaches-2)
- Sterling Hinds, Washington (Coaches-2)
- Chris Brewer, Arizona (Coaches-2)

=== Wide receivers ===
- Mike Sherrard, UCLA (Coaches-1)
- Brad Anderson, Arizona (Coaches-1)
- Emile Harry, Stanford (Coaches-2)
- Reggie Bynum, Oregon St. (Coaches-2)

=== Tight ends ===
- Paul Bergmann, UCLA (Coaches-1)
- Fred Cornwell, USC (Coaches-2)

=== Tackles ===
- Duval Love, UCLA (Coaches-1)
- Charlie Flager, Washington St. (Coaches-2)
- Marsharne Graves, Arizona (Coaches-2)
- Mike White, Arizona St. (Coaches-2)

=== Guards ===
- Gary Zimmerman, Oregon (Coaches-1)
- Rick Mallory, Washington (Coaches-1)
- Dan Lynch, Washington St. (Coaches-1)
- Mike Freeman, Arizona (Coaches-2)
- Tom Hallock, USC (Coaches-2)

=== Centers ===
- Tony Slaton, USC (Coaches-1)

== Defensive selections ==
=== Linemen ===
- Keith Millard, Washington St. (Coaches-1)
- Ron Holmes, Washington (Coaches-1)
- Dan Ralph, Oregon (Coaches-1)
- Eric Williams, Washington St. (Coaches-1)
- Garin Veris, Stanford (Coaches-2)
- Ivan Lesnik, Arizona (Coaches-2)
- Lynn Madsen, Washington (Coaches-2)
- Steve Baack, Oregon (Coaches-2)

=== Linebackers ===
- Ron Rivera, California (Coaches-1)
- Ricky Hunley, Arizona (Coaches-1)
- Jack Del Rio, USC (Coaches-1)
- Neal Dellocono, UCLA (Coaches-1)
- Dave Wyman, Stanford (Coaches-2)
- James Murphy, Oregon St. (Coaches-2)
- Keith Browner, USC (Coaches-2)
- Doug West, UCLA (Coaches-2)

=== Defensive backs ===
- Don Rogers, UCLA (Coaches-1)
- Lupe Sanchez, UCLA (Coaches-1)
- Randy Robbins, Arizona (Coaches-1)
- David Fulcher, Arizona St. (Coaches-1)
- Vaughn Williams, Stanford (Coaches-2)
- Richard Rodgers Sr., California (Coaches-2)
- Ken Taylor, Oregon St. (Coaches-2)
- Vince Albritton, Washington (Coaches-2)

== Special teams ==
=== Placekickers ===
- Luis Zendejas, Arizona St. (Coaches-1)
- Max Zendejas, Arizona (Coaches-2)

=== Punters ===
- Kevin Hicks, Oregon (Coaches-1)
- Jim Meyers, Arizona St. (Coaches-2)

=== Return specialists ===
- Lew Barnes, Oregon (Coaches-1)
- Dwight Garner, California (Coaches-2)

== Key ==
Coaches = Pacific-10 head football coaches

== See also ==
- 1983 College Football All-America Team
