= Gerald McNeil =

American football player (born 1962)

No. 89
- Positions: Wide receiver, return specialist

Personal information
- Born: March 27, 1962 (age 64); Frankfurt, Germany
- Listed height: 5 ft 7 in (1.70 m)
- Listed weight: 145 lb (66 kg)

Career information
- High school: Killeen (Killeen, Texas)
- College: Baylor
- Supplemental draft: 1984: 2nd round, 44th overall pick

Career history
- Houston Gamblers (1984–1985); Cleveland Browns (1986–1989); Houston Oilers (1990)

Awards and highlights
- Pro Bowl (1987); All-USFL (1985); First-team All-American (1983); SWC Offensive Player of the Year (1983); 2× First-team All-SWC (1982, 1983)

Career NFL statistics
- Receptions: 29
- Receiving yards: 380
- Receiving TDs: 2
- Return yards: 3,569
- Return TDs: 2
- Stats at Pro Football Reference

Gerald Lynn McNeil (born March 27, 1962) is an American former professional football player who was a wide receiver and return specialist for five seasons in the National Football League (NFL) with the Cleveland Browns and Houston Oilers. He also played in the United States Football League (USFL) for two seasons with the Houston Gamblers.

McNeil played college football for the Baylor Bears, earning first-team All-American honors in 1983. The lightest player in the NFL, McNeil was nicknamed "the Ice Cube" because he was small and difficult for tacklers to grab hold of. It was also a play off Bears defensive tackle William Perry’s nickname, “The Refrigerator”. McNeil was drafted in the 1984 NFL supplemental draft and selected to the Pro Bowl in 1987. Known for his explosive returning ability, McNeil scored four touchdowns in his NFL career, including an 84-yard punt return against the Detroit Lions and a 100-yard kickoff return against the Pittsburgh Steelers.

== Early life ==
McNeil was born in West Germany, where his father was serving in the U.S. Army. He attended Killeen High School in Killeen, Texas.

McNeil played college football at Baylor University in Waco, Texas, from 1980 to 1983. He earned All-American honors as a wide receiver. One of his teammates was future Houston Oilers quarterback Cody Carlson. McNeil's brother, Pat, also played football at Baylor.

In his four seasons at Baylor, McNeil caught 163 passes for 2,651 yards, returned 101 punts for 886 yards, returned 31 kickoffs for 573 yards, and scored 17 touchdowns. He set school records for receptions and receiving yards which still stand among the top ten all-time to the present day.

== Professional football career ==
=== USFL ===
Our last signing was Gerald McNeil. He had been born in West Germany and became a high school track star in Texas and a college football legend at Baylor. He came with only one drawback: He was 5-foot-7 and weighed 139 pounds. Soaking wet. But he ran a 4.19 in the 40. We signed him immediately.

— Gamblers owner Jerry Argovitz

McNeil was selected by the San Antonio Gunslingers in the 1984 USFL Territorial Draft. He was later traded to the Houston Gamblers. In his two seasons with the Gamblers, he caught 91 passes for 1,518 yards, returned 69 punts for 830 yards, returned two kickoffs for 62 yards, and scored ten touchdowns. He was the USFL's leading punt returner in 1985.

=== NFL ===
McNeil was selected by the Cleveland Browns in the second round of the 1984 NFL Supplemental Draft of USFL and CFL players. He made his NFL debut in 1986 and played four seasons with the Browns, then played his fifth and final season with the Houston Oilers. In 1987 he made the pro bowl as a kick returner, returning 34 punts for 387 yards and a career best 11.4 yards per return average.

In his five NFL seasons, McNeil caught 29 passes for 380 yards, returned 191 punts for 1,717 yards, returned 91 kickoffs for 1,852 yards, and scored four touchdowns.

In 1986, McNeil was the only player in the NFL and the first since 1978 to return both a punt and a kickoff for a touchdown in the same season.

Although McNeil's listed weight was 145 lb (66 kg), McNeil stated in a March 2013 interview that "I usually came in around 140 pounds, but a lot of times I would lose 10, 12 pounds during the season very easily, so I played most of the time between 125 and 130."
