= Ed Martin (American football) =

American football player (born 1962)

No. 59
- Position: Linebacker

Personal information
- Born: March 29, 1962 (age 64); Evanston, Illinois, U.S.
- Listed height: 6 ft 4 in (1.93 m)
- Listed weight: 220 lb (100 kg)

Career information
- High school: Evanston Township (IL)
- College: Indiana State
- NFL draft: 1984: 6th round, 187th overall pick

Career history
- Los Angeles Express (1984–1985); Indianapolis Colts (1986)*
- * Offseason or practice squad member only

Awards and highlights
- Division I-AA All-American (1983); 2× All-MVC (1982, 1983)

Career USFL statistics
- Games played: 7

Ed Martin (born March 29, 1962) is an American former football linebacker in the United States Football League (USFL) for the Los Angeles Express. He played college football at Indiana State University.

== Early life ==
Martin attended Evanston Township High School, where he practiced football and basketball. As a senior, he received special mention All-State honors at defensive end. He also made the National Honor Society.

He accepted a football scholarship from Division I-AA Indiana State University. As a junior, he led the team with 121 tackles (78 solo) and 15 tackles for loss.

As a senior, he registered 2 interceptions. He was the runner-up for the Missouri Valley Conference Defensive Player of the Year (behind Terry Taylor). Martin contributed to the school's having its best record (9–4), it first playoff appearance, its first ever Top 10 Division I-AA National ranking (5th) and reaching the quarterfinals, losing to Southern Illinois University.

In 2009, he was inducted into the Indiana State University Athletics Hall of Fame.

== Professional career ==
=== Los Angeles Express (USFL) ===
Martin was selected by the Dallas Cowboys in the seventh round (193rd overall) of the 1984 NFL draft. He also was selected by the Pittsburgh Maulers in the sixth round of the 1984 USFL draft.

On June 1, he opted to sign with the Los Angeles Express of the United States Football League, after the Maulers traded his rights. He was released on April 26, 1985.

=== Indianapolis Colts ===
On March 24, 1986, he was signed as a free agent by the Indianapolis Colts. He decided to leave training camp on July 23.

== Personal life ==
On October 5, 2017, he was diagnosed with Amyotrophic lateral sclerosis (ALS).
