= 1983 All-Southwest Conference football team =

American college football all-star team

The 1983 All-Southwest Conference football team consists of American football players chosen, at each position, as the best players in the Southwest Conference during the 1983 NCAA Division I-A football season. The selectors for the 1983 season included the United Press International (UPI).

== All Southwest selections ==
=== Offense ===
==== Quarterbacks ====
- Lance McIlhenny, SMU (UPI-1)
- Kevin Murray, Texas A&M (UPI-2)

==== Running backs ====
- Reggie Dupard, SMU (UPI-1)
- Alfred Anderson, Baylor (UPI-1)
- Donald Jordan, Houston (UPI-2)
- Jeff Atkins, SMU (UPI-2)

==== Tight ends ====
- Rich Siler, Texas A&M (UPI-1)
- Rickey Bolden, SMU (UPI-2)

==== Wide Receivers ====
- Gerald McNeil, Baylor (UPI-1)
- James Maness, TCU (UPI-1)
- Ron Morris, SMU (UPI-2)
- Bruce Davis, Baylor (UPI-2)

==== Offensive tackles ====
- Mark Adickes, Baylor (UPI-1)
- Brian O'Meara, SMU (UPI-1)
- Gene Chilton, Texas (UPI-2)
- Grady Burnette, SMU (UPI-2)

==== Offensive guards ====
- Doug Dawson, Texas (UPI-1)
- Marcus Elliott, Arkansas (UPI-1)
- Kirk McJunkin, Texas (UPI-2)
- Andrew Campbell, SMU (UPI-2)

==== Centers ====
- Mike Ruether, Texas (UPI-1)
- Chris Jackson, SMU (UPI-2)

==== Placekickers ====
- Jeff Ward, Texas (UPI-1)
- Alan Smith, Texas A&M (UPI-2)

==== Punters ====
- John Teltschik, Texas (UPI-1)
- Kyle Stuard, Texas A&M (UPI-2)

=== Defense ===
==== Defensive ends ====
- Eric Holle, Texas (UPI-1)
- Ron Faurot, Arkansas (UPI-1)
- Anthony Beverly, SMU (UPI-2)
- Ervin Randle, Baylor (UPI-2)

==== Defensive tackles ====
- Ray Childress, Texas A&M (UPI-1)
- Tony Degrate, Texas (UPI-1)
- Mitch Willis, SMU (UPI-2)
- John Haines, Texas (UPI-2)

==== Middle guards ====
- Michael Carter, SMU (UPI-1)
- Keith Guthrie, Texas A&M (UPI-2)

==== Linebackers ====
- Jeff Leiding, Texas (UPI-1)
- Bert Zinamon, Arkansas (UPI-1)
- Mark Lang, Texas (UPI-2)
- Eugene Lockhart, Houston (UPI-2)

==== Defensive backs ====
- Jerry Gray, Texas (UPI-1)
- Russell Carter, SMU (UPI-1)
- Mossy Cade, Texas (UPI-1)
- Allanda Smith, TCU (UPI-1)
- Dwayne Anderson, SMU (UPI-2)
- Stan David, Texas Tech (UPI-2)
- Aaron Grant, Baylor (UPI-2)
- Fred Acorn, Texas (UPI-2)

== Miscellaneous ==
- Offensive Player of the Year: Gerald McNeil, Baylor (UPI)
- Defensive Players of the Year: Jerry Gray, Texas and Russell Carter, SMU (UPI)
- Coach of the Year: Fred Akers, Texas (UPI)
- Newcomer of the Year: Kevin Murray, Texas A&M (UPI)

== Key ==
UPI = United Press International

== See also ==
- 1983 College Football All-America Team
