= Boyd Jones =

American football player (born 1961)

No. 71
- Position: Offensive tackle / guard

Personal information
- Born: May 30, 1961 (age 65); Galveston, Texas, US
- Listed height: 6 ft 3 in (1.91 m)
- Listed weight: 265 lb (120 kg)

Career information
- College: Texas Southern (1979–1983)
- NFL draft: 1984: undrafted

Career history
- Green Bay Packers (1984)

Career NFL statistics
- Games played: 2
- Stats at Pro Football Reference

Boyd Efram Jones (born May 30, 1961) is an American former professional football player in the offensive tackle and guard positions. He played college football for the Texas Southern Tigers and later for one season professionally with the Green Bay Packers of the National Football League (NFL).

== Early life ==
Jones was born on May 30, 1961, in Galveston, Texas. After high school, he enrolled at Texas Southern University (TSU) in 1979, where he played for the Texas Southern Tigers football team as an offensive tackle. He attended TSU from 1979 to 1983 and was a four-year starter for the Tigers. Standing at 6 feet 4 inches (1.93 m) and weighing 260 pounds (120 kg), he and James Grisby were the team's two largest offensive players. As a junior in 1982, Jones was named second-team All-Southwestern Athletic Conference (SWAC).

TSU performed poorly during Jones's tenure with the team, compiling records of 3–8 (1979), 2–9 (1980), 4–6–1 (1981), 1–9–1 (1982), and 4–6 (1983) in his years there. He played under multiple head coaches at TSU. He was scouted by the Green Bay Packers while in college; one scout recalled that when visiting, the school's offensive line coach was absent, and thus Jones stepped in to the role.

== Professional career ==
Jones was selected by the Houston Gamblers in the 1984 USFL territorial draft but did not sign with them. After going unselected in the 1984 NFL draft, he signed with the Green Bay Packers as an undrafted free agent. Packers offensive line coach Jerry Wampfler described Jones as inexperienced and called him "green as grass", but Jones soon impressed him as he "was tenacious, had quick feet and was hard to knock off balance", according to the Green Bay Press-Gazette. Considered small for tackle, he was moved to guard during the team's training camp. He was described as being a "longshot" to make the team, but nonetheless made the final roster by beating out Ron Sams. Head coach Forrest Gregg noted that Jones had "really come a long way in a short time. He did a good job at both guard and tackle." He made his NFL debut in the team's season-opening win over the St. Louis Cardinals, and also saw action the following week against the Los Angeles Raiders. However, he was released by the Packers on September 15, 1984, six days after his second game. He did not sign with another team afterwards, ending his professional career with two games played.
