= Paul Bergmann =

American football player (born 1961)

No. 84
- Position: Tight end

Personal information
- Born: March 30, 1961 (age 65); Los Angeles, California, U.S.
- Listed height: 6 ft 3 in (1.91 m)
- Listed weight: 250 lb (113 kg)

Career information
- High school: Granada Hills Charter (Los Angeles)
- College: UCLA
- Supplemental draft: 1984: 1st round, 8th overall pick

Career history
- Jacksonville Bulls (1984); Oakland Invaders (1985)

Awards and highlights
- Second-team All-American (1983); First-team All-Pac-10 (1983)

Paul George Bergmann (born March 30, 1961) is an American former professional football player who was a tight end in the United States Football League (USFL) and National Football League (NFL). He played college football for the UCLA Bruins.

== Early life ==
Bergmann's football career began on the receiving end of John Elway's passes under legendary coach Jack Neumeier at Granada Hills Charter High School. Bergmann was a All-League, All-Valley, All-L.A. City receiver and linebacker. In the 1979 East vs. West Shrine All Star game Bergmann caught 9 passes and touchdowns from former teammate N.F.L. Hall of Fame John Elway and future UCLA Hall of Fame QB Tom Ramsey. Elway went on to Stanford, and Bergmann went to play at UCLA, on a full scholarship.

== College career ==
Bergmann lettered for the UCLA Bruins in 1982 and 1983. He was the recipient of the UCLA N.N. Sugarman Memorial Award for Best Leadership On Offense 1983, the UCLA George W. Dickerson Award for Outstanding Offensive Player in the 1983 USC game defeating the Trojans 27-17 for the PAC-10 Championship and a trip to the Rose Bowl. He was a 1st Team All-Pac-10 selection, UPI 1st Team All-West Coast, a 2nd Team AP and a UPI All-American selection. In those seasons, UCLA's record was 10-1-1, 7-4-1. Bergmann has 85 career receptions catching passes in 24 consecutive games, for 1076 receiving yards and 5 touchdowns. His season receptions and cumulative receptions were all-time UCLA records for a Tight-End.

Career	UCLA	85	1076	12.7	5

Career	UCLA	85	1076	12.7	5

Bergmann was a starting member of UCLA's 1983 Rose Bowl, where he led all receivers with 6 receptions defeating the Michigan Wolverines and the 1984 Rose Bowl Championship, where he caught the first touchdown pass of the game and 4 receptions thrown by Rick Neuheisel. Quarterback Rick Neuheisel would be the Rose Bowl MVP in the defeat of the Illinois Fighting Illini 45-9.

== Professional career ==
Bergmann was selected by the Jacksonville Bulls in the 3rd round of the 1984 USFL draft (43rd overall) and signed with them. That season he played in 16 games with 15 starts and 48 receptions for 647yds and 3 tds and one rush for 6 yards.

That summer he was the 8th pick in the 1st round of the 1984 NFL supplemental draft of USFL and CFL players by the Indianapolis Colts, but did not choose to go to the NFL at that time.

Despite being named the most valuable offensive player on the team and the second leading receiver, he was cut by the Bulls going into the 1985 season because he was not big enough for what they wanted a tight end to do and because they were able to get another tight end in the dispersal draft. He was picked up by the New Jersey Generals who planned to place him on their development team, so he asked to be waived instead. He was then signed by the USFL's Oakland Invaders in 1985, played in 13 games and caught his last pass of his professional career in the 1985 Championship game versus the Baltimore Stars - which was also the last game of the original USFL.

The Colts still held Bergmann's rights but waived him from the injured reserve list in November 1985 without him ever taking the field. The following spring he was signed by the Kansas City Chiefs but spent the season on the injured reserve list. During the following training camp he was waived without ever playing in a game in the NFL.

== Later life ==
He resides in Ojai, California, with his wife. Bergmann was ordained by the Evangelical Church Alliance, Bradley Illinois on October 12, 1995, and then by Ojai Valley Community Church February 1, 1998 where he served as a progressive Senior Pastor 1998-2021.
