= Allanda Smith =

American football player (born 1962)

No. 38
- Position: Defensive back

Personal information
- Born: March 7, 1962 (age 64); Houston, Texas, U.S.
- Listed height: 6 ft 1 in (1.85 m)
- Listed weight: 190 lb (86 kg)

Career information
- High school: Booker T. Washington
- College: TCU
- Supplemental draft: 1984: 1st round, 13th overall pick

Career history
- Los Angeles Express (1984–1985); Minnesota Vikings (1985); Washington Redskins (1986)

Awards and highlights
- First-team All-SWC (1983)

Allanda Smith (born March 7, 1962) is a former American football player. Smith attended Texas Christian University. He was a defensive back on the school's football team. Smith was drafted by the Washington Federals in the 1984 United States Football League draft. His rights were traded to the LA Express. Smith signed with the Express and played the 1984 and 1985 USFL seasons with LA. Smith was drafted by the NFL's Minnesota Vikings in the 1984 NFL Supplemental Draft of USFL and CFL players. Smith signed with the Vikings in time for the 1985 NFL season. He was on the injury reserve list for the whole 1985 season and was released by the Vikings during the off season between 1985 and 1986. He signed with the Washington Redskins in 1986. , but was released before the season started.
