= Reynaldo Hill =

American football player (born 1982)

No. 21, 22
- Position: Cornerback

Personal information
- Born: August 28, 1982 (age 44); Pahokee, Florida, U.S.
- Listed height: 5 ft 11 in (1.80 m)
- Listed weight: 185 lb (84 kg)

Career information
- High school: Stranahan (Fort Lauderdale, Florida)
- College: Florida
- NFL draft: 2005: 7th round, 218th overall pick

Career history
- Tennessee Titans (2005–2008); Omaha Nighthawks (2011)

Career NFL statistics
- Total tackles: 133
- Forced fumbles: 1
- Fumble recoveries: 1
- Pass deflections: 16
- Interceptions: 6
- Defensive touchdowns: 1
- Stats at Pro Football Reference

Reynaldo Romel Hill (born August 28, 1982) is an American former professional football player who was a cornerback for four seasons in the National Football League (NFL) during the early 2000s. Hill played college football for the Florida Gators, and thereafter, he played for the Tennessee Titans of the NFL and the Omaha Nighthawks of the United Football League (UFL).

== Early life ==
Hill was born in Pahokee, Florida, in 1982. He attended Stranahan High School in Fort Lauderdale, Florida, where he played high school football for the Stranahan Dragons.

== College career ==
Hill attended Dodge City Community College in Dodge City, Kansas, before accepting an athletic scholarship to transfer to the University of Florida in Gainesville, Florida. As a sophomore at Dodge City Community College, he led the NJCAA with twenty-two passes defensed, and added 57 tackles, three interceptions, two returned kickoffs and one returned punt for touchdowns. As a freshman, Hill had forty-five tackles, six interceptions, two fumble recoveries and fifteen breakups. He was a significant contributor to the Dodge City Community College secondary that was ranked first in the nation among junior colleges, and also returned fourteen punts for eighty-nine yards and scored two touchdowns. Hill also ran track at Dodge City Community College and ranked fifth nationally in the 200 meter dash his sophomore year.

While attending Florida, Hill played for coach Ron Zook's Florida Gators football team in 2003 and 2004. He appeared in twenty-five games in his two seasons as a Gator, and started in twelve during his senior season in 2004. He totaled fifty-seven tackles, one interception, and nine passes defensed throughout his college career. He was named to the Super Sleeper Team by the NFL Draft Report prior to the 2005 NFL draft.

== Professional career ==
Pre-draft measurables
Height	Weight	40-yard dash
5 ft 11 in (1.80 m)	187 lb (85 kg)	4.36 s
All values from Pro Day

Before the 2005 NFL draft, Hill was not invited to participate at the NFL Scouting Combine. At the University of Florida's Pro Day, Hill posted a 40-yard dash time of 4.32 seconds and a 37.5-inch vertical leap, which rated among the top ten performances at the 2005 combine.

=== Tennessee Titans ===
The Tennessee Titans selected Hill in the seventh round (218th pick overall) of the 2005 NFL Draft. He subsequently played for the Titans for four seasons from 2005 to 2008. After competing for a roster spot among a group of talented, young defensive backs in the Titans training camp, Hill took over the starting position midway through the 2005 NFL season and started the remaining ten games of the year. Hill showcased his play-making abilities by leading the team with three interceptions and tied for most interceptions among NFL rookie defensive backs. Hill scored his first career touchdown on a 52-yard interception that he returned for a touchdown against the Oakland Raiders. During the 2005 season, Hill started ten of the fifteen games in which he played, ending the season as the Titans interception leader with three, including one for a touchdown, and had forty-eight tackles. During the 2006 season, Hill started fourteen of fifteen games he played, ending the season with a career-high fifty-six total tackles and two interceptions.

In 2007, Hill started just two games after losing his starting job. In 2008, his role was as a backup cornerback. After two seasons of declining playing time, Hill became a free agent.

=== Omaha Nighthawks ===
Hill was selected in the first round (second pick overall) by the Omaha Nighthawks of the United Football League on June 29, 2011.

== NFL career statistics ==
Legend
**Bold**	Career high

=== Regular season ===
Year	Team	Games		Tackles					Interceptions					Fumbles			
Year	Team	GP	GS	Cmb	Solo	Ast	Sck	TFL	Int	Yds	TD	Lng	PD	FF	FR	Yds	TD
2005	TEN	15	10	54	**44**	10	0.0	**3**	**3**	**88**	**1**	**52**	**9**	**1**	0	0	0
2006	TEN	15	14	**56**	39	**17**	0.0	1	2	20	0	11	5	0	0	0	0
2007	TEN	13	2	20	15	5	0.0	1	1	0	0	0	2	0	**1**	0	0
2008	TEN	5	0	3	1	2	0.0	0	0	0	0	0	0	0	0	0	0
		48	26	133	99	34	0.0	5	6	108	1	52	16	1	1	0	0

=== Playoffs ===
Year	Team	Games		Tackles					Interceptions					Fumbles			
Year	Team	GP	GS	Cmb	Solo	Ast	Sck	TFL	Int	Yds	TD	Lng	PD	FF	FR	Yds	TD
2007	TEN	1	0	0	0	0	0.0	0	0	0	0	0	0	0	0	0	0
		1	0	0	0	0	0.0	0	0	0	0	0	0	0	0	0	0

== Personal life ==
Reynaldo married his wife Janina in 2009. They have two children together, Reynaldo Hill Jr. and Caden Hill.

== See also ==
- History of the Tennessee Titans
- List of Florida Gators in the NFL draft
