= Clarence Verdin =

American football player (born 1963)

No. 2, 83, 89
- Position: Wide receiver / Punt returner

Personal information
- Born: June 14, 1963 (age 63); Dulac, Louisiana, U.S.
- Listed height: 5 ft 8 in (1.73 m)
- Listed weight: 160 lb (73 kg)

Career information
- High school: South Terrebonne (Bourg, Louisiana)
- College: Southwestern Louisiana
- Supplemental draft: 1984: 3rd round, 83rd overall pick

Career history
- Houston Gamblers (1984–1985); Washington Redskins (1986–1987); Indianapolis Colts (1988–1993); Minnesota Vikings (1994)*; Atlanta Falcons (1994); Tampa Bay Buccaneers (1995)*; BC Lions (1996)
- * Offseason or practice squad member only

Awards and highlights
- Super Bowl champion (XXII); 2× Pro Bowl (1990, 1992); NFL kickoff return yards leader (1993); All-USFL (1985)

Career NFL statistics
- Games played: 118
- Games started: 25
- Receptions: 82
- Receiving yards: 1,329
- Return yards: 6,580
- Total Touchdowns: 12
- Stats at Pro Football Reference

Clarence Verdin (born June 14, 1963) is an American former professional football player who was a wide receiver and kick returner in the National Football League (NFL) for the Washington Redskins, Indianapolis Colts and Atlanta Falcons. He also was a member of the Houston Gamblers in the United States Football League (USFL) and the BC Lions in the Canadian Football League (CFL). He played college football at the University of Southwestern Louisiana

== Early life ==
Verdin attended South Terrebonne High School. He accepted a football scholarship from the University of Southwestern Louisiana.

== Professional career ==
Verdin was selected by the Houston Gamblers in the 17th round (356th overall) of the 1984 USFL draft. He was also selected by the Washington Redskins in the third round (83rd overall) of the 1984 NFL supplemental draft of USFL and CFL players.

In 1986, he signed with the Washington Redskins after the USFL folded. During his time with the Indianapolis Colts, he was famous for his end-zone celebration known as "The Verdance". He was selected for two Pro Bowls as a punt returner.

In 1996, he signed as a free agent with the BC Lions of the Canadian Football League, but was released after five games.
