= David Marshall (gridiron football) =

American football player (born 1961)

No. 59, 73, 96
- Position: Linebacker

Personal information
- Born: January 31, 1961 (age 65); Cleveland, Ohio, U.S.
- Listed height: 6 ft 3 in (1.91 m)
- Listed weight: 220 lb (100 kg)

Career information
- High school: Benedictine (Cleveland)
- College: Eastern Michigan
- NFL draft: 1984: undrafted

Career history
- Michigan Panthers (1984)*; Cleveland Browns (1984); Toronto Argonauts (1985–1986); Miami Dolphins (1987)
- * Offseason or practice squad member only
- Stats at Pro Football Reference

David Mark Marshall (born January 31, 1961) is an American former professional football linebacker who played in the National Football League (NFL) with the Cleveland Browns and Miami Dolphins. He played college football for the Eastern Michigan Eagles.

== Early life ==
David Mark Marshall was born on January 31, 1961, in Cleveland, Ohio. He attended Benedictine High School in Cleveland. He attended Cleveland Browns games as a child.

== College career ==
Marshall enrolled at Eastern Michigan University to play college football for the Eagles. He was a letterman in 1979, 1981, 1982, and 1983. He was a team co-captain in 1982. Captains for the 1983 season were decided on a game-by-game basis. Marshall earned second-team All-Mid-American Conference honors as a senior in 1983. He finished his college career with 360 tackles, the second most in school history at the time. It is the fifth-highest total in school history as of 2025.

== Professional career ==
Marshall was selected by the Michigan Panthers in the 1984 USFL territorial draft. He signed with the team on January 19, 1984. He was released on February 20, a week before the 1984 regular season opener.

Marshall signed with the Cleveland Browns on June 18, 1984. He played in all 16 games for the Browns during the 1984 season as a reserve linebacker. He was released on August 27, 1985, after the third preseason game.

Marshall was signed by the Toronto Argonauts of the Canadian Football League (CFL) on September 21, 1985. He played in four games for Toronto during the 1985 CFL season, recording one interception for 11 yards and one fumble recovery. He dressed in all 18 games for the Argonauts in 1986, posting three interceptions for 23 yards, three sacks, and five fumble recoveries.

Marshall became a free agent after the 1986 season, and signed with the Miami Dolphins on March 9, 1987. He was released on September 7 but re-signed the next day. He missed three games during the 1987 season due to the 1987 NFL players strike. Marshall played in two games overall for the Dolphins as a backup linebacker in 1987 before being released on October 24, 1987.
