= Tim Riordan =

American football player (born 1960)

No. 10, 14
- Position: Quarterback

Personal information
- Born: July 15, 1960 (age 66); New London, Connecticut, U.S.
- Listed height: 6 ft 1 in (1.85 m)
- Listed weight: 185 lb (84 kg)

Career information
- High school: New London
- College: Temple
- Supplemental draft: 1984: 3rd round, 73rd overall pick

Career history
- Philadelphia/Baltimore Stars (1984–1985); St. Louis Cardinals (1986)*; New Orleans Saints (1987)
- * Offseason or practice squad member only
- Stats at Pro Football Reference

Timothy P. Riordan (born July 15, 1960) is an American former professional football quarterback who played for the New Orleans Saints of the National Football League (NFL) and the Philadelphia/Baltimore Stars of the United States Football League (USFL). He played college football at Temple University.

== Early life and college ==
Timothy P. Riordan was born on July 15, 1960, in New London, Connecticut. He attended New London High School.

Riordan played college football for the Temple Owls of Temple University and was a two-year letterman from 1982 to 1983. He completed 13 of 30 passes (43.3%) for 107 yards and three interceptions in 1981. During the 1982 season, he recorded 157 completions on 247 passing attempts (63.6%) for 1,840 yards, 13 touchdowns, and seven interceptions while also rushing for two touchdowns. His completion percentage was the highest among independents that year. Riordan also led all independents with a 137.8 passer rating. He completed 143 of 277 passes (51.6%) for 1,732 yards, seven touchdowns and 11 interceptions in 1983 while scoring two rushing touchdowns.

== Professional career ==
On January 4, 1984, Riordan was a territorial selection of the Philadelphia Stars in the 1984 USFL draft. He signed with the Stars on January 20, 1984. He played in 14 games for the Stars during the 1984 USFL season, totaling six completions on 11 attempts for 103 yards, and one carry for three yards. On June 5, 1984, Riordan was selected by the St. Louis Cardinals in the third round of the 1984 NFL supplemental draft of USFL and CFL players. The Stars moved to Baltimore, Maryland in 1985. He completed 21 of 36 (58.3%) passes for 260 yards and one touchdown in 1985. He became a free agent after the 1985 season.

On August 14, 1986, Riordan signed with the Cardinals. However, he was soon released on August 28, 1986.

On October 14, 1987, Riordan was signed by the New Orleans Saints during the 1987 NFL players strike. He played in one game for the Saints, rushing once for three yards and throwing an incompletion. He was released on October 19, 1987, after the strike ended.
