= Jeff Spek =

Canadian gridiron football player (born 1960)

No. 88
- Position: Tight end

Personal information
- Born: October 1, 1960 (age 66); Calgary, Alberta
- Listed height: 6 ft 3 in (1.91 m)
- Listed weight: 240 lb (109 kg)

Career information
- High school: El Modena (CA)
- College: San Diego State
- Supplemental draft: 1984: 3rd round, 81st overall pick

Career history
- New Jersey Generals (1984–1985); Dallas Cowboys (1986)*; Tampa Bay Buccaneers (1986)
- * Offseason or practice squad member only

Career NFL statistics
- Games played: 2
- Stats at Pro Football Reference

Jeff Martin Spek (born October 1, 1960) is an American former professional football player who was a tight end in the National Football League (NFL) for the Tampa Bay Buccaneers. He also was a member of the New Jersey Generals in the United States Football League (USFL). He played college football at the University of Nevada, Las Vegas.

== Early life ==
Spek was born in Calgary, Alberta, Canada, and played football at El Modena High School in Orange, California. He went on to attend the University of Nevada, Las Vegas. In 1981 as a junior, he registered 54 receptions for 895 yards, 13th in nation in total yards. After the season, a coaching change made him take the decision to transfer to San Diego State University, along with Jim Sandusky. He was a starter in his senior season.

== Professional career ==
=== New Jersey Generals (USFL) ===
Spek was selected by the New Jersey Generals in the 15th round (303rd overall) of the 1984 USFL draft. He became a starter at tight end as a rookie and registered 49 receptions (team leader), 732 receiving yards (led the team) and 5 receiving touchdowns (led the team). His stats dropped the next year with rookie Doug Flutie as the new starter at quarterback (Brian Sipe was the previous starter).

=== Dallas Cowboys ===
He was selected by the Dallas Cowboys in the third round (81st overall) of the 1984 NFL Supplemental Draft of USFL and CFL Players. He signed a contract on August 12, 1986, to start playing in the NFL after the USFL folded. He was waived on August 26.

=== Tampa Bay Buccaneers ===
On October 25, 1986, Spek was signed by the Tampa Bay Buccaneers as a free agent. He played as a backup, after his professional career ended with a blown knee, suffered while playing special teams against the Buffalo Bills. He was later placed on the injured reserve list.
