= Al Williams (gridiron football) =

American gridiron football player (born 1961)

No. 84
- Position: Wide receiver

Personal information
- Born: October 5, 1961 (age 65); Vidalia, Georgia, U.S.
- Listed height: 5 ft 10 in (1.78 m)
- Listed weight: 180 lb (82 kg)

Career information
- High school: Long Beach Polytechnic (Long Beach, California)
- College: Nevada
- Supplemental draft: 1984: 1st round, 20th overall pick

Career history
- Oklahoma/Arizona Outlaws (1984–1985); Detroit Lions (1984–1986)*; San Diego Chargers (1987); New Orleans Saints (1987)*; Tampa Bay Buccaneers (1988)*; Hamilton Tiger-Cats (1989)
- * Offseason or practice squad member only

Career NFL statistics
- Receptions: 12
- Receiving yards: 247
- Receiving touchdowns: 1
- Stats at Pro Football Reference

Career CFL statistics
- Receptions: 9
- Receiving yards: 144
- Receiving touchdowns: 0

Alphonso Williams (born October 5, 1961) is an American former professional football player who was a wide receiver in the United States Football League (USFL), National Football League (NFL), and Canadian Football League (CFL). He played college football for the Nevada Wolf Pack.

== Professional career ==
Williams was selected by the New Jersey Generals in the 18th round (364th overall) of the 1984 USFL draft and the Detroit Lions in the first round (20th overall) of the 1984 NFL Supplemental Draft.

He ended up playing for the Oklahoma/Arizona Outlaws, while the Detroit Lions kept him on the practice squad. After the USFL folded and the Detroit Lions released him in 1986, Williams became a free agent. In 1987, Williams was picked up by the San Diego Chargers and New Orleans Saints during preseason, then played in three games for the San Diego Chargers during the NFLPA strike. He was traded to the Tampa Bay Buccaneers for a conditional draft pick, then last played in the CFL for the Hamilton Tiger-Cats.

== Personal life ==
Williams had settled in Arizona. He revealed in a podcast with former teammate Billy Ray Smith Jr. that he was coaching and been involved with multiple charities for the local youth.
