= Derek Kennard =

American football player (born 1962)

No. 70, 60
- Positions: Guard, center

Personal information
- Born: September 9, 1962 (age 64); Stockton, California, U.S.
- Listed height: 6 ft 3 in (1.91 m)
- Listed weight: 333 lb (151 kg)

Career information
- High school: Edison (Stockton)
- College: Nevada
- Supplemental draft: 1984: 2nd round, 45th overall pick

Career history
- Los Angeles Express (1984–1985); St. Louis/Phoenix Cardinals (1986–1990); New Orleans Saints (1991–1993); Dallas Cowboys (1994–1996)

Awards and highlights
- Super Bowl champion (XXX); Second-team All-Pro (1992); Division I-AA All-American (1983); 2× All-Big Sky (1982, 1983); Second-team All-Big Sky (1981); Big Sky Conference Silver Anniversary team

Career NFL statistics
- Games played: 134
- Games started: 122
- Stats at Pro Football Reference

Derek Craig Kennard (born September 9, 1962) is an American former professional football player who was a guard and center in the National Football League (NFL) for the St. Louis/Phoenix Cardinals, New Orleans Saints, and Dallas Cowboys. He also was a member of the Los Angeles Express in the United States Football League (USFL). He played college football for the Nevada Wolf Pack.

== Early life ==
Kennard attended Edison High School, where he was an offensive tackle and his No. 73 jersey was retired in 1996. He accepted a football scholarship from the University of Nevada, Reno, where he was a second-team All-Big Sky as a sophomore, and All-Big Sky as a junior and senior. He was named to the Division I-AA All-American as an offensive tackle in 1983.

In 1996, he was inducted into Nevada Athletics Hall of Fame and he also is part of the Big Sky Conference Silver Anniversary team.

== Professional career ==
=== Los Angeles Express ===
Kennard was selected by the Los Angeles Express in the third round (53rd overall) of the 1984 USFL draft. He was converted into a guard and played in 20 games during 2 seasons.

=== St. Louis / Phoenix Cardinals ===
Kennard was selected by the St. Louis Cardinals in the second round (45th overall) of the 1984 NFL Supplemental Draft of USFL and CFL players. He joined them after the USFL folded in August 1986, starting 10 out of 15 games at left guard.

In 1987, he started the final 11 games at center. In 1988, he was the regular starter at center and was an alternate selection to the Pro Bowl.

In 1989, he was suspended 2 games after crashing his car while driving under the influence and started 14 games at center. In 1990, he was moved to left guard to make room for Bill Lewis at center. He played in 73 games and had a streak of 40 consecutive starts.

=== New Orleans Saints ===
On August 19, 1991, he was traded along with a fifth round draft choice (#118-Rogerick Green) to the New Orleans Saints, in exchange for holdout cornerback Robert Massey. He opened the season as the starter at right guard, but suffered a torn pectoral muscle in a weight room accident, and was lost for the year after the third game.

In 1991, he regained his starting position at right guard. He missed the season finale with a sprained ankle. In 1992, he started the first 14 games at right guard before moving to center in place of an injured Joel Hilgenberg in the fifteenth game, and returned to guard for the season finale.

Kennard played 3 seasons and had 32 consecutive starts at guard and center.

=== Dallas Cowboys ===
On April 18, 1994, he signed with the Dallas Cowboys as an unrestricted free agent, primarily to be the starting right guard, replacing Kevin Gogan who signed with the Los Angeles Raiders in free agency.

In 1995 after injuring his hip in training camp, he told the team that he was retiring because of health reasons, but Jerry Jones eventually convinced him to return. When Larry Allen moved from left tackle back to right guard, he became a backup offensive lineman. After Ray Donaldson suffered a broken right ankle and was placed on the injured reserve list, he started the last 4 games at center and all of the playoffs. In Super Bowl XXX he started at center and played with a severe separated shoulder.

Although he was not a part of the team at the start of the 1996 season, the Cowboys signed him to help in one game. He retired at the end of the year.

== Personal life ==
His sons Derek Kennard Jr. played defensive tackle for the University of Nevada, and Devon Kennard played linebacker for the New York Giants, Detroit Lions and Arizona Cardinals from 2014-2022, and USC from 2009-2013.

After retiring from the NFL, he promoted sleep apnea awareness with a company called Pro Player Health Alliance. In the summer of 1986, he shot several episodes of the HBO series 1st & Ten.
