= Eugene Lockhart =

American football player (born 1961)

No. 56, 51
- Position: Linebacker

Personal information
- Born: March 7, 1961 (age 65); Crockett, Texas, U.S.
- Listed height: 6 ft 2 in (1.88 m)
- Listed weight: 228 lb (103 kg)

Career information
- High school: Crockett (Crockett, Texas)
- College: Houston
- NFL draft: 1984: 6th round, 152nd overall pick

Career history
- Dallas Cowboys (1984–1990); New England Patriots (1991–1992)

Awards and highlights
- Second-team All-Pro (1989); PFWA All-Rookie Team (1984); Second-team All-SWC (1983)

Career NFL statistics
- Games played: 136
- Tackles: 1,001
- Sacks: 16
- Interceptions: 6
- Touchdowns: 1
- Stats at Pro Football Reference

Eugene Lockhart, Jr. (born March 7, 1961) is an American former professional football player who was a linebacker in the National Football League (NFL) for the Dallas Cowboys and New England Patriots. He played college football at the University of Houston and was selected in the sixth round of the 1984 NFL draft.

== Early life ==
Lockhart attended Crockett High School and became a two-year starting linebacker for the University of Houston during the 1982 and 1983 seasons.

In 1983, Lockhart was named tri-captain of the Cougars football team. He led the team with 134 tackles, was named second-team All Southwest Conference by UPI and was voted the team's most valuable player. Lockhart graduated with a degree in marketing.

== Professional career ==
=== Dallas Cowboys ===
Lockhart was selected by the Dallas Cowboys in the sixth round (152nd overall) of the 1984 NFL draft. He was also selected by the Houston Gamblers in the 1984 USFL Territorial Draft.

Lockhart became the first rookie in Cowboys history to start at middle linebacker, when Bob Breunig went down with a back injury during the first half of the season. After Breunig retired at the end of the year, he became just the fourth player in Cowboys' history to have held that position on a regular basis. After leading the team with 86 tackles (49 solo), Lockhart was named to the 1984 NFL All-Rookie team.

In 1985, in his first full season as a starter, he led the team in tackles (128), fumble recoveries (4) and forced fumbles (3). In 1986, he led the team with 121 tackles, 77 of them solo and had a career-high 5 sacks. In 1988, he led the team with 121 tackles, 72 of them solo, while registering 3 passes deflected and 2 fumble recoveries.

In Dallas, his punishing hits earned him the nickname "Mean Gene, the hitting machine". Lockhart led the team in tackles in four of his seven years with the Cowboys and contributed with more than 100 tackles in every season except 1987, when he registered 80 tackles (52 solo), after suffering a fractured right fibula and missing the last 3 games.

In 1989, he led the NFL and set a club record with 222 tackles, while also leading the team in interceptions (2) and the linebackers in passes deflected (8). He also set club records with 154 solo tackles, 16 double-digit tackle games and 16 solo tackles in a game against the Phoenix Cardinals (10-29-1989). He did not make the Pro Bowl that year, but he was named to the 1989 All-Pro first-team and was a bright spot on an otherwise dismal 1–15 team. In 1990, he led the team with 139 tackles (72 solo).

Lockhart played for the Cowboys during a low point in the franchise's history. He was one of the few standout players on otherwise lackluster teams, which eventually cost him a chance to earn Pro Bowl honors and other accolades. He finished his Cowboys career with 897 tackles and second-team All-Pro honors.

Head coach Jimmy Johnson's system favored more agile linebackers, so Lockhart was traded to the New England Patriots on April 19, 1991. In exchange for the first overall draft pick of the 1991 NFL draft (Russell Maryland), he was traded to the Patriots along with cornerback Ron Francis, linebacker David Howard, a 1991 first round pick (#11 Pat Harlow), and a 1991 second round pick (#41 Jerome Henderson). While cleaning out his locker, he was quoted saying, "It's a cold business — a cold, cold business, and it's even colder in New England."

=== New England Patriots ===
In 1991, he had 42 solo tackles, 64 total, which was fourth on the team. The next year, he played in 16 games (8 starts) and finished fourth on the team with 70 tackles (42 solo). He was waived on August 30, 1993.

Lockhart played in the NFL for 9 seasons (7 with the Cowboys, 2 with the Patriots), started 117 games, recorded over 1,001 tackles, 16 sacks and 6 interceptions (1 returned for a TD).

== Personal life ==
Starting in 1998, Lockhart has run an annual turkey giveaway program in his hometown of Crockett.

In 2009, Lockhart and eight others were indicted on federal charges of organizing a $20 million mortgage fraud scheme in the Dallas, Texas, area. In late 2012, Lockhart was convicted and sentenced to 54 months in prison for the fraud. In November 2014, representing himself in court, he lost an appeal to reduce restitution garnishment from his pension. He also filed a lawsuit seeking $80,000 in damages due to allegedly substandard medical care he received during incarceration. He was released in May 2015 after serving about three years of his sentence and was required to complete about two years' probation.
