= Lee Williams (American football) =

American football player (born 1962)

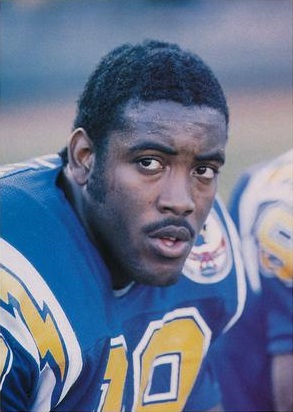
- Williams in 1984

No. 99, 97
- Position: Defensive end

Personal information
- Born: October 15, 1962 (age 64); Fort Lauderdale, Florida, U.S.
- Listed height: 6 ft 6 in (1.98 m)
- Listed weight: 269 lb (122 kg)

Career information
- High school: Fort Lauderdale (FL) Stranahan
- College: Bethune-Cookman
- Supplemental draft: 1984: 1st round, 6th overall pick

Career history
- San Diego Chargers (1984–1990); Houston Oilers (1991–1993)

Awards and highlights
- Second-team All-Pro (1989); 2× Pro Bowl (1988, 1989)

Career NFL statistics
- Sacks: 82.5
- Interceptions: 2
- Touchdowns: 1
- Stats at Pro Football Reference

Lee Eric Williams (born October 15, 1962 in Fort Lauderdale, Florida) is an American former professional football player who was a defensive end in the National Football League (NFL). He was drafted by the San Diego Chargers sixth overall in the 1984 NFL Supplemental Draft of USFL and CFL Players. He played college football at Bethune-Cookman.

== Early life ==
Williams attended Stranahan High School. He accepted a football scholarship from Bethune–Cookman University.

== Professional career ==
Williams was selected by the Tampa Bay Bandits in the 1984 USFL Territorial Draft. He was traded to the Los Angeles Express, where he played the 1984 USFL season.

He was also selected by the San Diego Chargers sixth overall in the 1984 NFL Supplemental Draft of USFL and CFL Players. He joined the Chargers to play the 1984 NFL season.

A two-time Pro Bowl selection with the Chargers, Williams also played for the Houston Oilers.
