= Jason Steele (politician) =

American politician (born 1948)

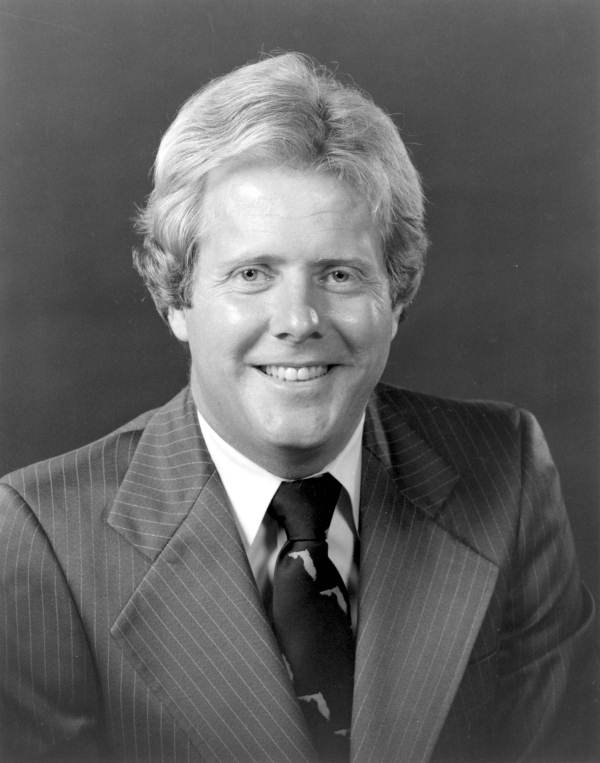
- Steele in 1980

Republican candidate for Florida House of Representatives (District 31)
- Election date 2008

Personal details
- Born: July 26, 1948 (age 77) Fort Lauderdale, Florida
- Party: Republican
- Occupation: Broker 2004–present Florida HOR Member 1980–1982

Jason Steele (born July 26, 1948) is an American politician who was a Republican member of the Florida House of Representatives from 1980 to 1982. His district included portions of Brevard County. He was born in Fort Lauderdale, Florida. Steele was appointed to the Brevard County Commission in June 2023 by Governor Ron DeSantis and served as Chairman until termed out in November 2024. Jason has been appointed by different Governors to many prestigious statewide committees, including Enterprise Florida BOD, and Space Florida BOD, Jason also served as the Director of the Division of Real Estate in Governor Jeb Bush’s administration.Steele was also the Chairman of the Brevard County Republican Party in 2010. Jason Steele has been involved in Republican Party campaigns for 55 years.

== Career ==
Steele's earliest experience was as a personal aide to Governor Claude Kirk.

In 1981 Steele served on the committee for Tourism, Economic Development and Transportation, Private Property Rights. He served as the Chairman of the Brevard County Legislative committee.

In 1993 Steele was seated as the Liaison to the Florida Real Estate Education Foundation. In 1994 he became an Agency Task Force committee member. In 1992 he became the Chairman of the Florida Real Estate Commission. Before this he was the Vice-Chairman.

In 1981 Steele ran an unsuccessful campaign for the Florida Senate.

From 1980–1982 Steele served in the Florida House of Representatives for District 44.

- 2004 to 2008 Prevent Board of Directors
- 2002 to 2008 Member Hubbs-Seaworld Research Institute Florida
- 1985 to 2008 Founder, and Member of Space Coast Tiger Bay Club
- 1992 Chairman Florida Real Estate Commission

== Professional experience ==
Steele is currently Director of Government Affairs for Smith & Associates in Melbourne, Florida . ]. From 2002-2004 he was the Director of the Division of Real Estate for the State of Florida. Circuit Court Judge George Maxwell appointed Steele the receiver for the Brevard Builder Group in 2002. In his early life, 1976–2003, he was Vice President of the Steele Company out of Indialantic, Florida.

Steele has been an expert witness and has been retained for legal opinion on real estate cases in the state of Florida. He was also appointed by Governor Bob Martinez to be a Florida Real Estate Commissioner for 8 years from 1988-1996. He has been a Real Estate Instructor since 1980.

== Education ==
Steele is an I.T.I. Trained Real Estate Instructor for GRI, Fair Housing, Sales and Marketing, Environmental Permitting, Agency, and Law. He attended Florida State University. He was awarded an associate degree from Broward Community College. Attended St. Thomas Aquinas High School (Fort Lauderdale, Florida). He graduated from Stranahan High School Ft. Lauderdale.
