= Chester Seabury =

First black student at White Florida school

Chester Seabury was the first African-American student to graduate from a white high school in the state of Florida, in 1963.

== History ==
Chester hoped to earn a scholarship to an Ivy League School, but needed a third year of Spanish, which was not offered at the black school he attended, Dillard High School. Chester's mother, Florrie Young Seabury, petitioned the school board to allow her son to attend Stranahan High School. He was allowed to attend, and became the first African-American to graduate from a white high school in Florida. In 1974 Seabury earned a Ph.D. in mathematics from Stanford. After teaching at M.I.T., he returned to Stanford and obtained J.D. and M.B.A degrees.
