= Robert Smith (defensive end) =

American gridiron football player (born 1962)

Robert B. Smith
No. 74
- Position: Defensive end

Personal information
- Born: December 3, 1962 (age 63); Bogalusa, Louisiana, U.S.
- Listed height: 6 ft 6 in (1.98 m)
- Listed weight: 255 lb (116 kg)

Career information
- High school: Bogalusa
- College: Grambling State
- Supplemental draft: 1984: 2nd round, 40th overall pick

Career history
- Arizona Wranglers (1984); Minnesota Vikings (1985); Dallas Cowboys (1987); Toronto Argonauts (1990); Tampa Bay Storm (1991); Detroit Drive (1992)
- Stats at Pro Football Reference
- Stats at ArenaFan.com

Robert Benjamin Smith (born December 3, 1962) is an American former professional football player who was a defensive end in the National Football League (NFL) for the Minnesota Vikings and Dallas Cowboys. He played college football for the Grambling State Tigers. He also was a member of the Arizona Wranglers, Toronto Argonauts, Tampa Bay Storm and Detroit Drive.

== Early life ==
Born in Bogalusa, Louisiana, he attended Bogalusa High School. He accepted a football scholarship from Grambling State University.

== Professional career ==
Smith was selected by the New Orleans Breakers in the 1984 USFL Territorial Draft. He was traded and signed to play for the Arizona Wranglers in the United States Football League for the 1984 season. He was also selected by the Minnesota Vikings in the second round (40th overall) of the 1984 NFL Supplemental Draft.

In 1985, he joined the Vikings after the USFL folded, playing in all 16 games as a backup at defensive end and defensive tackle, though he was almost exclusively used as a field goal blocker due to his 6'6 frame. He was released before the start of the 1986 season.

In 1987, he was signed as a free agent by the Dallas Cowboys. He broke his left arm during the preseason and was placed on the injured reserve list. He was released before the start of the 1988 season.
