= Stranahan High School =

Public high School in Fort Lauderdale, Florida

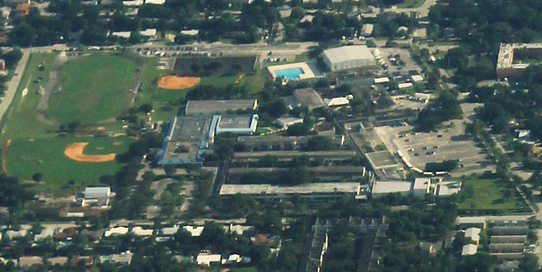

Location
- 1800 SW 5th Place; Fort Lauderdale, Florida 33312; United States
- Coordinates: 26.1117534°N 80.165046°W

Information
- Type: Public
- Established: 1953
- School district: Broward County Public Schools
- Superintendent: Howard Hepburn
- Principal: Nichola Gayle
- Teaching staff: 65.00 (FTE)
- Enrollment: 1,438 (2022–23)
- Student to teacher ratio: 22.12
- Colors: Orange and Blue
- Mascot: Mighty Dragon
- Nickname: Home of the Dragons
- Website: stranahan.browardschools.com

Stranahan High School, located in Fort Lauderdale, Florida, was officially opened in 1953 as an elementary school. The school is a part of the Broward County Public Schools district. Originally for white students only, In 1963 Chester Seabury became the first African-American to graduate from a white high school in Florida when he graduated from Stranahan.

The school was built on land donated by Ivy Julia Cromartie Stranahan and was named after her late husband Frank Stranahan. The school progressively added the junior high school grades a year at a time due to rapid population growth in the area. The school opened as a high school in 1957. The first principal of Stranahan was Kenneth Dale Haun. Kenneth Haun had been a Junior High Assistant Principal when he was picked to help design and then serve as principal of Stranahan until 1966. As the school added grades each year and then gradually dropped the middle school grades, Kenneth Haun continued as head of the school. He served as principal for nearly thirty years. The school's unique design of separate buildings spread out more like a college campus was a result of limited funds to build the school. Buildings were gradually added in phases to accommodate the growth of the student population. The first hall building was converted to a 2-story building in the 1950s. During renovations of the first hall in the early 90s, there was a large fire that consumed most of the building. The building was renovated and it now contains the administration on the first floor and the second floor has English and social studies classrooms. The second hall has computer labs and foreign language classrooms. The third hall has art classrooms and the fourth hall has math. The magnet classrooms are mostly in the new science and medical magnet buildings. Previously some of the magnet classrooms were located in the second and third hall.

The current principal is Nichola Gayle. Stranahan High has an FCAT school grade of "B" for the 2013 academic year.

== Overview ==
Stranahan High School has two magnet programs dedicated to engineering and medical sciences. The magnet program's first graduating class was in 1997. It received a Gates Grant in 2005 and has begun a transition to small learning communities. The present community serving 9th-grade students is CREST. Tenth through 12th-grade students may choose among communities dedicated to business (downtown community), the arts (the studio community), technology and engineering (Sci-Tech community), or health-related careers (the health pavilion community). In 2007 Stranahan was recognized by the College Board as one of three high schools in the nation to receive an "Inspiration Award" for outstanding achievement in minority student participation in Advanced Placement classes. It was also recognized by Newsweek magazine as one of the top 500 high schools in the country.

== Attendance zone ==
The school serves sections of Fort Lauderdale and Davie.

== Medical Magnet ==
Students in the Medical Magnet program will be given specialized classes that are designed to inform them of general aspects of the medical field. Some of these classes include medical research, biotechnology, genetics, and forensics. Students are also encouraged in the Medical Magnet program to take Anatomy and Physiology versus physics, and also include special classes such as Health Science. Students in their 12th grade year are given the opportunity to travel to Broward General Hospital in order to observe different departments and also become interactive with doctors, nurses, or any staff.

== Sports ==
- Girls soccer
- Boys soccer
- Football
- Volleyball
- Swimming
- Cheer-leading
- Girls flag football
- Girls basketball
- Boys basketball
- Baseball
- Cross Country
- Wrestling
- Softball
- Track and Field
- Step Team

== Extra curricular clubs ==
- Business Professionals of America
- Ecology Club
- Key Club
- Marine Biology Club
- MCJROTC
- Mu Alpha Theta
- National Honor Society
- Gay Straight Alliance
- Student Government Association (SGA)
- National Honor Society
- Women of Tomorrow
- Youth Crime Watch
- Health Occupations Students of America (HOSA)
- Best Buddies
- Future Florida Educators of America (FFEA)
- First Priority
- Poetry Club
- Guitar Club
- Colorful Spaces Club (BIPOC)

== Demographics ==
As of the 2021–22 school year, the total student enrollment was 1,499. The ethnic makeup of the school was 33.4% White, 63.6% Black, 29.5% Hispanic, 0.7% Asian, 1.9% Multiracial, 0.3% Native American or Native Alaskan, and 0.1% Native Hawaiian or Pacific Islander.

== Notable alumni ==
- Tiffany Bolling, actress
- Rubin Carter, Defensive Tackle (1975–1986) Denver Broncos
- Reynaldo Hill, former NFL cornerback for the Tennessee Titans
- John Hope, pitcher (1993–1996) Pittsburgh Pirates
- Undra Johnson, running back, NFL, Atlanta Falcons, New Orleans Saints, Dallas Cowboys
- Andre King, Wide Receiver (2001–2004) Cleveland Browns
- Jacinta Monroe, (WNBA) Forward (2011–current) Tulsa Shock
- Jim Naugle, former mayor of Fort Lauderdale
- Sandra Peabody, talent agent, acting coach, former actress
- Demetrius Rhaney, football offensive lineman, St. Louis Rams
- Carlton Rose, professional football player.
- Chester Seabury, first African-American to graduate from a white high school in Florida
- Jason Steele, politician
- Diana Williams, ABC News evening anchor in New York City
- Lee Williams, Defensive Tackle San Diego Chargers
