= Demetrius Rhaney =

American football player (born 1992)

No. 65, 61, 74, 62, 59
- Position: Center

Personal information
- Born: June 22, 1992 (age 34); Fort Lauderdale, Florida, U.S.
- Listed height: 6 ft 2 in (1.88 m)
- Listed weight: 300 lb (136 kg)

Career information
- High school: Stranahan (Fort Lauderdale)
- College: Ellsworth CC (2010–2011); Tennessee State (2012–2013)
- NFL draft: 2014: 7th round, 250th overall pick

Career history
- St. Louis / Los Angeles Rams (2014–2016); Jacksonville Jaguars (2017)*; Washington Redskins (2017–2018); Memphis Express (2019); Hamilton Tiger-Cats (2019); Buffalo Bills (2019)*; Houston Roughnecks (2020)
- * Offseason or practice squad member only

Career NFL statistics
- Games played: 33
- Games started: 1
- Stats at Pro Football Reference

Demetrius Rhaney (born June 22, 1992) is an American former professional football player who was a center in the National Football League (NFL) and Canadian Football League (CFL). He was selected by the St. Louis Rams in the seventh round of the 2014 NFL draft. He played college football for the Tennessee State Tigers, having also played at Ellsworth Community College.

== Early life ==
A native of Fort Lauderdale, Florida, Rhaney lost his mother, Veronica Dixon to a sudden illness when he was in seventh grade. He attended Academy High School in Coral Springs, Florida, before it was shut down, and later Stranahan High School.

== College career ==
Because his transcript from Academy was lost, he could not meet NCAA requirements to accept a scholarship offer from Alabama A&M University. Instead, he enrolled at Ellsworth CC, and later Tennessee State.

== Professional career ==
=== St. Louis / Los Angeles Rams ===
Rhaney was selected by the St. Louis Rams in the seventh round, 250th overall, of the 2014 NFL draft. On June 20, 2017, Rhaney was waived by the Rams.

=== Jacksonville Jaguars ===
On June 21, 2017, Rhaney was claimed off waivers by the Jacksonville Jaguars. He was released on September 1, 2017.

=== Washington Redskins ===
On November 21, 2017, Rhaney signed with the Washington Redskins.

On September 1, 2018, Rhaney was waived for final roster cuts before the start of the 2018 season. He was re-signed on December 5, 2018, but was waived six days later.

=== Memphis Express ===
In 2019, Rhaney joined the Memphis Express of the Alliance of American Football (AAF).

=== Hamilton Tiger-Cats ===
After the AAF ceased operations in April 2019, Rhaney signed with the Hamilton Tiger-Cats of the Canadian Football League on May 23, 2019.

=== Buffalo Bills ===
On August 10, 2019, Rhaney was signed by the Buffalo Bills. He was waived on August 31, 2019.

=== Houston Roughnecks ===
Rhaney was selected in the 2020 XFL draft by the Houston Roughnecks. He had his contract terminated when the league suspended operations on April 10, 2020.
