= Mike Ruether =

American football player (born 1962)

No. 51, 57, 55
- Positions: Center, guard, tight end

Personal information
- Born: September 20, 1962; Inglewood, California, U.S.
- Died: December 29, 2021 (aged 59); Atlanta, Georgia, U.S.
- Listed height: 6 ft 4 in (1.93 m)
- Listed weight: 279 lb (127 kg)

Career information
- High school: Bishop Miege (Roeland Park, Kansas)
- College: Texas
- Supplemental draft: 1984: 1st round, 17th overall pick

Career history
- Los Angeles Express (1984–1985); St. Louis Cardinals (1986–1987); Denver Broncos (1988–1989); Atlanta Falcons (1990–1993); Minnesota Vikings (1994)

Awards and highlights
- First-team All-American (1983); First-team All-SWC (1983); 1983 Southwest Conference Champion; 1982 Cotton Bowl Classic Champion
- Stats at Pro Football Reference

Michael Allen Ruether (September 20, 1962 - December 29, 2021) was an American professional football player who was an offensive lineman and tight end in the National Football League (NFL). He played college football for the Texas Longhorns, earning first-team All-American honors as a lineman in 1983. During his 10-year professional career, he played primarily with the NFL's Atlanta Falcons and went to Super Bowl XXIV with the Denver Broncos. He also played for the Los Angeles Express and the St. Louis Cardinals and spent a year with the Minnesota Vikings.

== College career ==
Ruether played college football at the University of Texas from 1980 to 1983. In 1983 he was an All-Southwest Conference, and first-team All-American selection on a team that won the conference championship and went into the Cotton Bowl undefeated and ranked No. 2. He also played for the 1981 team that spent a week ranked No. 1 and finished the season ranked No. 2 after upsetting Alabama in the Cotton Bowl Classic.

== Professional career ==
In early 1984, Ruether was selected by the Houston Gamblers of the USFL and then traded to the Los Angeles Express along with Mark Adickes for two future picks. He played for the Los Angeles Express of the USFL, where he snapped the ball to future Hall of Famer Steve Young in 1984 and 1985 before entering the NFL with the Cardinals in 1986. He started all but two games his rookie season in which they made it to the Conference Championship game, but was not a starter in 1985 and battled knee, elbow and neck injuries. When the USFL folded in 1986, Ruiether signed with the St. Louis Cardinals. The Cardinals held his rights because they drafted him in the first round of the 1984 NFL Supplemental Draft of USFL and CFL players.

With the Cardinals, Ruether started two games at center in one and 2/3rds seasons he was with them, but again dealt with ankle injuries. Prior to the start of the 1988 season, he was signed as a free agent by the Cardinals, which by then had moved to Phoenix, and then traded to Denver for Ricky Hunley before the season started.

Ruether was a back-up center for the Denver Broncos in 1988 and went to Super Bowl XXIV with them. At the end of the season he was resigned with them as a Plan B free agent. He was released by the Broncos early in the 1989 season, but then signed with them again 5 weeks later.

He was a Plan B free agent again in 1990 and was signed by the Atlanta Falcons where he played the last four seasons of his career. In Atlanta, he played center, guard and tight end. He had his most successful season with the Falcons in 1991 when he started 6 games and even caught a pass for 22 yards. He was an unrestricted free agent at the end of the 1994 season and resigned with Atlanta, but was then released in August.

In November 1994 he was signed as a free agent by the Minnesota Vikings. He never took the field with them and was a free agent when the season ended.

He was married for some time to Marjorie Severin Biasotto and they had two children – son Reece Austin Ruether and daughter Ramsey Severin Phillips - and a granddaughter Charley Severin Phillips. His parents were Bob and Connie Ruether.
