= Brian Allen (wide receiver) =

American football player (born 1962)

Profile
- Position: Wide receiver

Personal information
- Born: August 6, 1962 (age 64); San Bernardino, California
- Listed height: 6 ft 0 in (1.83 m)
- Listed weight: 184 lb (83 kg)

Career information
- High school: Bishop Carroll Catholic HS
- Junior college: Hutchinson CC
- College: Idaho

Career history
- 1984: Edmonton Eskimos

Brian Allen (born August 6, 1962) is a former gridiron football wide receiver who played one game for the Edmonton Eskimos of the Canadian Football League in 1984 and with the Washington Redskins in 1984 the National Football League on the practice squad. He played college football for the Idaho Vandals. In the 1984 USFL collegiate draft, Allen was selected in the 15th round by the Oklahoma Outlaws with the 314th pick, but he didn't play with the Outlaws.
