= George Jamison =

American football player (born 1962)

No. 95, 58, 57
- Position: Linebacker

Personal information
- Born: September 30, 1962 (age 64); Bridgeton, New Jersey, U.S.
- Listed height: 6 ft 1 in (1.85 m)
- Listed weight: 228 lb (103 kg)

Career information
- High school: Bridgeton
- College: Cincinnati
- Supplemental draft: 1984: 2nd round, 47th overall pick

Career history
- Philadelphia / Baltimore Stars (1984–1985); Detroit Lions (1986–1993); Kansas City Chiefs (1994–1996); Detroit Lions (1997–1998)

Career NFL statistics
- NFL Tackles: 557
- NFL Sacks: 20.5
- NFL Interceptions: 9
- Stats at Pro Football Reference

George R. Jamison Jr. (born September 30, 1962) is an American former professional football player who was a linebacker in the National Football League (NFL). He played college football for the Cincinnati Bearcats. After playing the 1984 and 1985 seasons in the United States Football League for the Philadelphia/Baltimore Stars, he joined the Detroit Lions in the NFL. The Lions selected him in the second round of the 1984 Supplemental Draft. He also played three seasons for the Kansas City Chiefs before rejoining the Lions to finish his career.

Jamison grew up in Bridgeton, New Jersey and attended Bridgeton High School.

He lives in Rochester, Michigan and has a daughter who is going to attend Northwestern University on a basketball scholarship. He also has a son who has graduated from Bowling Green State University and is now teaching in the West Bloomfield School District.
