= Orlando Lowry =

American football player (born 1961)

Profile
- Position: linebacker

Personal information
- Born: August 14, 1961 (age 65); Cleveland, Ohio, U.S.
- Listed height: 6 ft 4 in (1.93 m)
- Listed weight: 237 lb (108 kg)

Career information
- High school: Shaker Heights (Shaker Heights, Ohio)
- College: Ohio State

Career history
- Indianapolis Colts (1985-1989); New England Patriots (1989)
- Stats at Pro Football Reference

Orlando Dewey Lowry (born August 14, 1961) is an American former professional football player who was a linebacker in the National Football League for the Indianapolis Colts and New England Patriots. He played college football for the Ohio State Buckeyes.

His brother Quentin Lowry played in the NFL.
