= Rickey Bolden =

American football player (born 1961)

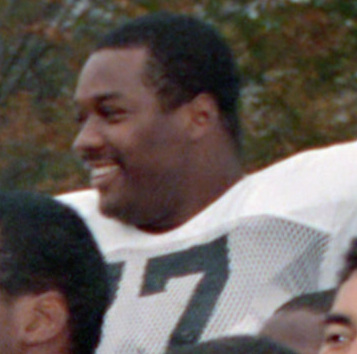
- Bolden with the Cleveland Browns in 1988

No. 88, 77
- Positions: Tackle, guard, tight end

Personal information
- Born: September 8, 1961 (age 65); Dallas, Texas, U.S.
- Listed height: 6 ft 6 in (1.98 m)
- Listed weight: 274 lb (124 kg)

Career information
- High school: Hillcrest (Dallas, Texas)
- College: SMU
- NFL draft: 1984: 4th round, 96th overall pick

Career history
- Cleveland Browns (1984–1989)

Awards and highlights
- 2× Second-team All-SWC (1982, 1983)

Career NFL statistics
- Games played: 62
- Games started: 34
- Receptions: 2
- Receiving yards: 22
- Receiving touchdowns: 1
- Stats at Pro Football Reference

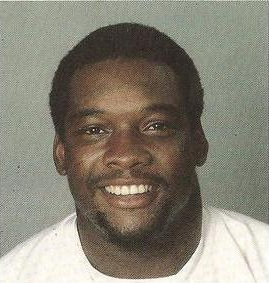

Rickey Allen Bolden (born September 8, 1961) is an American former professional football player who played offensive lineman for six seasons for the Cleveland Browns. He was selected by the Browns in the fourth round of the 1984 NFL draft.

Bolden was raised in Dallas, Texas as one of ten children. His father died when he was 12 years old. According to Bolden, he grew up in "a typical inner city." He said he was shot when he was 14 years old.

Bolden played college football as a tight end for the SMU Mustangs. After being selected by the Browns in the 1984 NFL draft, he was converted to offensive line.

While still only 28 years old and a starting offensive lineman for the Browns, Bolden left football to become a pastor. He completed his studies at Ashland Theological Seminary and worked with churches of various Christian denominations.
