= John Sullivan (defensive back) =

American football player (born 1961)

No. 38, 33, 43
- Position: Defensive back

Personal information
- Born: November 15, 1961 (age 64); Hartford, Connecticut, U.S.
- Listed height: 6 ft 1 in (1.85 m)
- Listed weight: 196 lb (89 kg)

Career information
- High school: Abraham Lincoln (San Francisco, California)
- College: California
- Supplemental draft: 1984: 3rd round, 72nd overall pick

Career history
- Oakland Invaders; Green Bay Packers (1986); San Diego Chargers (1986); San Francisco 49ers (1987)

Career NFL statistics
- Games played: 16
- Stats at Pro Football Reference

John Lloyd Sullivan (born November 15, 1961) is an American former professional football player who was a defensive back in the National Football League (NFL). He played college football for the California Golden Bears.

== Biography ==
Sullivan was born on November 15, 1961, in Hartford, Connecticut.

== Career ==
After playing with the Oakland Invaders of the United States Football League, Sullivan was drafted in the third round of the 1984 NFL Supplemental Draft of USFL and CFL Players by the Green Bay Packers. He would later split the 1986 NFL season with the Packers and the San Diego Chargers. The following season, he was a member of the San Francisco 49ers.

He played at the collegiate level at the University of California, Berkeley.
