= Alvin Powell =

American football player (born 1959)

No. 73
- Position: Guard

Personal information
- Born: November 19, 1959 (age 66)

Career information
- College: Winston–Salem State
- Supplemental draft: 1984: 2nd round, 49th overall pick

Career history
- Oklahoma/Arizona Outlaws (1984–1985); Seattle Seahawks (1987–1988); Miami Dolphins (1989); Cleveland Thunderbolts (1992)

Career NFL statistics
- Career Games Played: 20
- Career Kickoffs Returned: 3
- Career Kickoff Return Yards: 23
- Stats at Pro Football Reference
- Stats at ArenaFan.com

Alvin Robert Powell II (born November 19, 1959) is a former National Football League guard. actor and celebrity bodyguard. He currently speaks about drug awareness and substance abuse.

== Football career ==
Powell spent the 1984 USFL season with the Oklahoma Outlaws based in Tulsa and then moved with the team in 1985 to become one of the Arizona Outlaws based in Tempe, Arizona, after Oklahoma had merged with the Arizona Wranglers. He blocked for among others, quarterback Doug Williams who would later win Super Bowl XXII with the Washington Redskins. Powell was drafted into the NFL in 1984 by the Seattle Seahawks, in the second round of the 1984 NFL Supplemental Draft of USFL and CFL Players (49th overall). Powell joined the NFL in 1987 with the Seattle Seahawks. The team was moderately successful that year, winning nine games, and losing six, before losing to the Houston Oilers in the AFC Wildcard playoff. The next year, the team won nine games, and lost seven, before losing to the Cincinnati Bengals in the AFC Divisional Playoff.

He joined the Miami Dolphins in 1989, but only played in two games before resigning.

He played with the London Monarchs of the World Football League from 1991 to 1992.

In his first season with the Seattle Seahawks (1987), he was involved in three kickoffs, gaining 23 yards. However, 14 of those came from one kickoff. He also fumbled the ball once. After that season, he never was involved in another NFL kickoff. In 1987, he played in a career-high twelve games. That number sank to six the next year, and to two by 1989.

== Filmography ==
- The Whole Nine Yards
- Lucky Number Slevin
- Snake Eyes

== Drug addiction and counseling ==
Powell started using crack cocaine in 1985, and by 1988 was addicted to cocaine, and was smoking marijuana and drinking significant amounts of alcohol.

Powell currently is a substance abuse counselor, helping people combat their drug problems. He also speaks at schools about drugs. Despite the fact that he is a devout Christian, he says that he never forces the people who he helps to believe in God.

He runs the Saving Station Foundation, which teaches people about the dangers of drugs. It is based in Montreal, Quebec, Canada.
