= Mitch Willis =

American football player (born 1962)

No. 98, 73
- Positions: Nose tackle, defensive tackle

Personal information
- Born: March 16, 1962 (age 64); Dallas, Texas, U.S.
- Listed height: 6 ft 8 in (2.03 m)
- Listed weight: 278 lb (126 kg)

Career information
- High school: Arlington-Lamar (Arlington, Texas)
- College: SMU
- NFL draft: 1984: 7th round, 183rd overall pick

Career history
- Los Angeles Raiders (1985–1988); Atlanta Falcons (1988); Indianapolis Colts (1989); Dallas Cowboys (1990)

Awards and highlights
- Second-team All-SWC (1983)

Career NFL statistics
- Sacks: 2
- Stats at Pro Football Reference

Otis Mitch Willis (born March 16, 1962) is an American former professional football player who was a nose tackle and defensive tackle in the National Football League (NFL). He played college football for the SMU Mustangs. He played six seasons in the NFL for the Los Angeles Raiders from 1985 to 1988, Atlanta Falcons in 1988, and Dallas Cowboys in 1990.
