= Lupe Sanchez =

American football defensive back

No. 28
- Positions: Defensive back, kick and punt returner

Personal information
- Born: October 28, 1961; Tulare, California, U.S.
- Died: April 28, 2025 (aged 63)
- Listed height: 5 ft 10 in (1.78 m)
- Listed weight: 192 lb (87 kg)

Career information
- High school: Mount Whitney
- College: UCLA
- Supplemental draft: 1984: 2nd round, 33rd overall pick

Career history
- Pittsburgh Steelers; Arizona Wranglers (USFL); Orlando Renegades (USFL)
- Stats at Pro Football Reference

Guadalupe Ledezma Sanchez (October 28, 1961 – April 28, 2025) was an American professional football player who was a defensive back and kick and punt returner for the Pittsburgh Steelers of the National Football League (NFL) from 1986 to 1988. He played college football for the UCLA Bruins.

== High school and collegiate career ==
Sanchez was born in Tulare, California, and grew up in Visalia, California. He played high school football at Mt. Whitney High School, where as a running back he helped lead the Pioneers to an undefeated season in 1978. Besides Sanchez, the team boasted two other future NFL players (Don Mosebar and Mike Young) and is considered one of the best teams in California high school football history. Sanchez is a member of the Mt. Whitney Athletics Hall of Fame.

Sanchez played college football for the UCLA Bruins from 1979 to 1983. Among his honors his senior year, he was named a first-team defensive back on the 1983 All-Pac-10 Football Team, All-America honorable mention by the AP and UCLA's Kenneth S. Washington Award for Outstanding Senior. His 13 interceptions as a Bruin are still the fifth most in UCLA history.

== Professional career ==
He was selected in the second round of the 1984 NFL supplemental draft by the Kansas City Chiefs but chose to play in the United States Football League (USFL) for the Arizona Wranglers and Orlando Renegades.

Sanchez joined the Steelers in 1986 and spent three seasons in Pittsburgh. In 39 games with the Steelers, he had four interceptions, returning one 67 yards for a touchdown in 1986. As a kick returner, he returned 35 kickoffs for 778 yards, averaging 22.2 yards per return. He was cut by the Steelers on April 19, 1989.

== Personal life and death ==
After football, Sanchez worked as a financial planner. Sanchez died on April 28, 2025, at the age of 63.
