= 1983 Denver Broncos season =

American football team season

- Owner: Edgar Kaiser
- General manager: Hein Poulus
- Head coach: Dan Reeves
- Offensive coordinator: John Hadl
- Defensive coordinator: Joe Collier
- Home stadium: Mile High Stadium

Results
- Record: 9–7
- Division place: 3rd AFC West
- Playoffs: Lost Wild Card Playoffs (at Seahawks) 7–31

Uniform
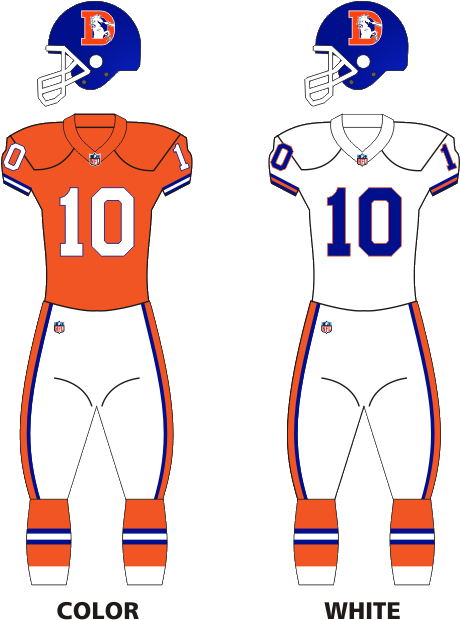

The 1983 Denver Broncos season was its 24th in professional football and 14th in the National Football League (NFL). Led by third-year head coach Dan Reeves, the Broncos were 9–7, third in the AFC West, and made their first playoff appearance in four seasons.

Before the season, the Broncos traded with the Baltimore Colts for the rights to first overall pick in the 1983 draft, quarterback John Elway. He started ten games for the Broncos as a rookie, and the team won four of them. In his first two starts, both road wins, Elway left the game trailing, relieved by veteran Steve DeBerg.

After three straight losses, Elway was benched by Reeves in early October; and DeBerg led the team to four consecutive victories and a 6–3 record. A shoulder injury in a loss in Seattle sidelined him and Elway again became the starter. In the rematch with Seattle two weeks later in Denver, Elway was out with the flu and third-string rookie Gary Kubiak led the Broncos to a win.

Elway's finest game as a rookie came in week 15, the Broncos' second game against Baltimore, the team that drafted him. Denver trailed 19–0 at the start of the fourth quarter, until Elway threw for three touchdowns in the final period to win 21–19 and kept their playoff hopes alive. The following week was a lopsided road loss at Kansas City in −30 °F (−34 °C) wind chill, but the Broncos made the playoffs, gaining the final AFC berth over Cleveland, also at 9–7, whom they defeated in week 14.

DeBerg started the wild card playoff loss in Seattle, and was relieved by Elway in the fourth quarter.

The Broncos' wild-card playoff loss to the Seahawks marked their only playoff appearance during the three-year ownership of Edgar Kaiser Jr.; Pat Bowlen bought the team the following spring.

== NFL draft ==
1983 Denver Broncos draft
Round	Pick	Player	Position	College	Notes
1	4	Chris Hinton	Guard	Northwestern	traded to the Baltimore Colts along with Quarterback Mark Herrmann and the Broncos' first round pick in the 1984 NFL Draft for John Elway
2	31	Mark Cooper	Tackle	Miami (FL)	1983-1987 (5 seasons) then Tampa Bay from 1987-1989
3	60	Clint Sampson	Wide Receiver	San Diego State	1983-1986 (4 seasons)
5	116	George "Weedy" Harris	Linebacker	Houston	
5	125	Bruce Baldwin	Defensive Back	Harding	
6	143	Victor Heflin	Defensive Back	Delaware State	not signed by the Broncos, but went on to play for the St. Louis Cardinals from 1983-1984
7	172	Myron Dupree	Defensive Back	North Carolina Central	1983
8	197	Gary Kubiak	Quarterback	Texas A&M	1983-1991 (9 seasons)
9	228	Brian Hawkins	Defensive Back	San Jose State	
10	254	Walt Bowyer	Defensive End	Arizona State	1983-1984, 1987-1988 (4 seasons)
11	283	Don Bailey	Center	Miami (FL)	not signed by the Broncos, but went on to play for the Indianapolis Colts from 1984-1985
12	310	Karl Mecklenburg *	Linebacker	Minnesota	1983-1994 (12 seasons), 6x Pro Bowl, 4x First Team All-Pro, Denver Broncos Ring of Fame
Made roster † Pro Football Hall of Fame * Made at least one Pro Bowl during career

== Personnel ==
=== Staff ===
1983 Denver Broncos staff
Front office: Owner – Edgar Kaiser; Vice President/General Manager – Hein Poulus; Director of Football Operations – John Beake; Coordinator of College Scouting – Reed Johnson; Head coaches: Head Coach – Dan Reeves; Assistant Head Coach/Defense – Joe Collier; Special Assistant – Marvin Bass; Offensive coaches: Quarterbacks/Wide Receivers – John Hadl; Running Backs – Nick Nicolau; Offensive Line – Dan Radakovich	Defensive coaches: Defensive Line – Stan Jones; Linebackers – Myrel Moore; Defensive Backs – Charlie West; Special teams coaches: Special Teams/Tight Ends – Fran Polsfoot; Strength and conditioning: Strength/Conditioning – IJ Gorman

=== Roster ===
1983 Denver Broncos roster
Quarterbacks (QB): 7 John Elway; 8 Gary Kubiak; Running backs (RB): 39 Jesse Myles; 34 Nathan Poole; 46 Dave Preston; 47 Gerald Willhite; 23 Sammy Winder; Wide receivers (WR): 84 Clint Sampson; 82 Zach Thomas; 80 Rick Upchurch; 81 Steve Watson; Tight ends (TE): 85 Ron Egloff; 88 Riley Odoms; 83 John Sawyer	Offensive linemen (OL): 74 Jerry Baker T; 54 Keith Bishop G; 64 Billy Bryan C; 63 Mark Cooper G; 62 Tom Glassic G; 60 Paul Howard G; 63 Ken Lanier T; 70 Dave Studdard T; 67 Keith Uecker T; Defensive linemen (DL): 65 Walt Bowyer DE; 68 Rubin Carter NT; 79 Barney Chavous DE; 75 Rulon Jones DE; 72 Don Latimer NT; 66 Brison Manor DE; 77 Karl Mecklenburg DE; 78 Rich Stachowski NT	Linebackers (LB): 58 Steve Busick ILB; 59 Darren Comeaux ILB; 55 Rick Dennison OLB; 53 Randy Gradishar ILB; 57 Tom Jackson OLB; 50 Jim Ryan OLB; 52 Ken Woodard OLB; Defensive backs (DB): 21 Myron Dupree SS; 43 Steve Foley FS; 31 Mike Harden CB; 28 Roger Jackson FS/CB; 29 Wilbur Myers FS; 49 Dennis Smith SS; 37 Steve Trimble SS; 45 Steve Wilson CB; 20 Louis Wright CB; Special teams (ST): 3 Rich Karlis K; 11 Luke Prestridge P	Reserve: 86 Dean Barnett TE (IR); 17 Steve DeBerg QB (IR); -- Bret Felknor DE (IR); -- George Harris LB (IR); 73 Shawn Hollingsworth T (IR); 41 Rob Lytle RB (IR); -- Maomao Niko T (IR); 24 Rick Parros RB (IR); -- Jeff Raikes WR (IR); 51 Bob Swenson LB (IR); 87 James Wright TE (IR); Rookies in italics

== Preseason ==
=== Schedule ===
Week	Date	Opponent	Result	Record	Venue	Attendance
1	August 5	Seattle Seahawks	W 10–7	1–0	Mile High Stadium	53,887
2	August 13	Atlanta Falcons	W 21–10	2–0	Mile High Stadium	73,199
3	August 20	Cleveland Browns	W 19–10	3–0	Mile High Stadium	73,244
4	August 26	at Minnesota Vikings	L 3–34	3–1	Hubert H. Humphrey Metrodome	59,435

== Regular season ==
=== Schedule ===
Week	Date	Opponent	Result	Record	Venue	Attendance
1	September 4	at Pittsburgh Steelers	**W** 14–10	1–0	Three Rivers Stadium	58,233
2	September 11	at Baltimore Colts	**W** 17–10	2–0	Memorial Stadium	52,613
3	September 18	Philadelphia Eagles	**L** 10–13	2–1	Mile High Stadium	74,202
4	September 25	**Los Angeles Raiders**	**L** 7–22	2–2	Mile High Stadium	74,289
5	October 2	at Chicago Bears	**L** 14–31	2–3	Soldier Field	58,210
6	October 9	at Houston Oilers	**W** 26–14	3–3	Astrodome	44,209
7	October 16	Cincinnati Bengals	**W** 24–17	4–3	Mile High Stadium	74,305
8	October 23	**San Diego Chargers**	**W** 14–6	5–3	Mile High Stadium	74,581
9	October 30	**Kansas City Chiefs**	**W** 27–24	6–3	Mile High Stadium	74,640
10	November 6	at **Seattle Seahawks**	**L** 19–27	6–4	Kingdome	61,189
11	November 13	at **Los Angeles Raiders**	**L** 20–22	6–5	Los Angeles Memorial Coliseum	51,945
12	November 20	**Seattle Seahawks**	**W** 38–27	7–5	Mile High Stadium	74,710
13	November 27	at **San Diego Chargers**	**L** 7–31	7–6	Jack Murphy Stadium	43,650
14	December 4	Cleveland Browns	**W** 27–6	8–6	Mile High Stadium	70,912
15	December 11	Baltimore Colts	**W** 21–19	9–6	Mile High Stadium	74,864
16	December 18	at **Kansas City Chiefs**	**L** 17–48	9–7	Arrowhead Stadium	11,377
Note: Intra-division opponents are in **bold** text.

=== Game summaries ===
==== Week 1 (Sunday, September 4, 1983): at Pittsburgh Steelers ====
Week 1: Denver Broncos at Pittsburgh Steelers – Game summary

Quarter	1	2	3	4	Total
**Broncos** (1–0)	0	7	0	7	**14**
Steelers (0–1)	0	7	3	0	**10**

at Three Rivers Stadium • Pittsburgh, Pennsylvania

- Date: September 4
- Game time: 11:00 a.m. MDT
- Game weather: 73 °F (23 °C), wind 5 mph (8 km/h)
- Game attendance: 58,233
- Referee: Jerry Seeman
- TV announcers (NBC): Bob Costas (play–by–play) and Bob Trumpy (color commentator)

Team	Category	Player	Statistics
DEN	Passing		
DEN	Rushing		
DEN	Receiving		
PIT	Passing		
PIT	Rushing		
PIT	Receiving		

Scoring summary

Quarter	Time	Drive			Team	Scoring information	Score	
Quarter	Time	Plays	Yards	TOP	Team	Scoring information	DEN	PIT
2	12:38				Broncos	Winder 1-yard touchdown run, Karlis kick good	7	0
2	1:08				Steelers	Harris 4-yard touchdown run, Anderson kick good	7	7
3	8:41				Steelers	31-yard field goal by Anderson	7	10
4	2:54				Broncos	Egloff 2-yard touchdown reception from DeBerg, Karlis kick good	14	10
"TOP" = time of possession. For other American football terms, see Glossary of American football.							14	10

- Point spread:
- Over/under:
- Time of game:

Broncos	Game statistics	Steelers
	First downs	
	Rushes–yards	
	Passing yards	
	Passes	
	Sacked–yards	
	Net passing yards	
	Total yards	
	Return yards	
	Punts	
	Fumbles–lost	
	Penalties–yards	
	Time of possession	

Individual stats

==== Week 2 (Sunday, September 11, 1983): at Baltimore Colts ====
Week 2: Denver Broncos at Baltimore Colts – Game summary

Quarter	1	2	3	4	Total
**Broncos** (2–0)	0	3	0	14	**17**
Colts (1–1)	3	0	0	7	**10**

at Memorial Stadium • Baltimore, Maryland

- Date: September 11
- Game time: 2:00 p.m. MDT
- Game weather: 84 °F (29 °C), wind 10 mph (16 km/h)
- Game attendance: 52,613
- Referee: Gene Barth
- TV announcers (NBC): Marv Albert (play–by–play) and John Brodie (color commentator)

Team	Category	Player	Statistics
DEN	Passing		
DEN	Rushing		
DEN	Receiving		
BAL	Passing		
BAL	Rushing		
BAL	Receiving		

Scoring summary

Quarter	Time	Drive			Team	Scoring information	Score	
Quarter	Time	Plays	Yards	TOP	Team	Scoring information	DEN	BAL
1	8:06				Colts	32-yard field goal by Allegre	0	3
2	1:51				Broncos	42-yard field goal by Karlis	3	3
4	11:45	—	—	—	Colts	Fumble recovery returned 41 yards for touchdown by Anderson, Allegre kick good	3	10
4	5:55				Broncos	Watson 24-yard touchdown reception from DeBerg, Karlis kick good	10	10
4	0:29				Broncos	Watson 2-yard touchdown run, Karlis kick good	17	10
"TOP" = time of possession. For other American football terms, see Glossary of American football.							17	10

- Point spread:
- Over/under:
- Time of game:

Broncos	Game statistics	Colts
	First downs	
	Rushes–yards	
	Passing yards	
	Passes	
	Sacked–yards	
	Net passing yards	
	Total yards	
	Return yards	
	Punts	
	Fumbles–lost	
	Penalties–yards	
	Time of possession	

Individual stats

==== Week 3 (Sunday, September 18, 1983): vs. Philadelphia Eagles ====
Week 3: Philadelphia Eagles at Denver Broncos – Game summary

Quarter	1	2	3	4	Total
**Eagles** (2–1)	7	0	0	6	**13**
Broncos (2–1)	0	0	3	7	**10**

at Mile High Stadium • Denver, Colorado

- Date: September 18
- Game time: 2:00 p.m. MDT
- Game attendance: 74,202
- Referee: Gordon McCarter
- TV announcers (CBS): Tom Brookshier (play–by–play) and Charlie Waters (color commentator)

Team	Category	Player	Statistics
PHI	Passing		
PHI	Rushing		
PHI	Receiving		
DEN	Passing		
DEN	Rushing		
DEN	Receiving		

Scoring summary

Quarter	Time	Drive			Team	Scoring information	Score	
Quarter	Time	Plays	Yards	TOP	Team	Scoring information	PHI	DEN
1	4:18				Eagles	Quick 38-yard touchdown reception from Jaworski, Franklin kick good	7	0
3	11:01				Broncos	34-yard field goal by Karlis	7	3
4	13:08				Eagles	20-yard field goal by Franklin	10	3
4	1:54				Broncos	Parros 33-yard touchdown reception from Elway, Karlis kick good	10	10
4	0:57				Eagles	43-yard field goal by Franklin	13	10
"TOP" = time of possession. For other American football terms, see Glossary of American football.							13	10

- Point spread:
- Over/under:
- Time of game:

Eagles	Game statistics	Broncos
	First downs	
	Rushes–yards	
	Passing yards	
	Passes	
	Sacked–yards	
	Net passing yards	
	Total yards	
	Return yards	
	Punts	
	Fumbles–lost	
	Penalties–yards	
	Time of possession	

Individual stats

==== Week 4 (Sunday, September 25, 1983): vs. Los Angeles Raiders ====
Week 4: Los Aneles Raiders at Denver Broncos – Game summary

Quarter	1	2	3	4	Total
**Raiders** (4–0)	0	7	13	2	**22**
Broncos (2–2)	0	0	0	7	**7**

at Mile High Stadium • Denver, Colorado

- Date: September 25
- Game time: 2:00 p.m. MDT
- Game attendance: 74,289
- Referee: Dick Jorgensen
- TV announcers (NBC): Marv Albert (play–by–play) and John Brodie (color commentator)

Team	Category	Player	Statistics
RAI	Passing	Jim Plunkett	13/24, 154 YDS, 2 TDs, 1 INT
RAI	Rushing	Marcus Allen	15 CAR, 45 YDS
RAI	Receiving	Marcus Allen	4 CAR, 20 YDS
DEN	Passing	Steve DeBerg	8/21, 117 YDS, 1 INT
DEN	Rushing	Sammy Winder	20 CAR, 119 YDS
DEN	Receiving	Steve Watson	5 REC, 72 YDS

Scoring summary

Quarter	Time	Drive			Team	Scoring information	Score	
Quarter	Time	Plays	Yards	TOP	Team	Scoring information	RAI	DEN
2	7:11	2	36		Raiders	Branch 35-yard touchdown reception from Plunkett, Bahr kick good	7	0
3	9:41				Raiders	27-yard field goal by Bahr	10	0
3	2:23				Raiders	29-yard field goal by Bahr	13	0
3	0:44				Raiders	Branch 17-yard touchdown reception from Plunkett, Bahr kick good	20	0
4	1:42	—	—	—	Broncos	Thomas 70-yard kickoff return for a touchdown, Karlis kick good	20	7
4	0:54	—	—	—	Raiders	DeBerg tackled in end zone for a safety by Townsend	22	7
"TOP" = time of possession. For other American football terms, see Glossary of American football.							22	7

- Point spread: Broncos +3½
- Over/under: 34.0 **(under)**
- Time of game:

Raiders	Game statistics	Broncos
11	First downs	16
37–82	Rushes–yards	30–130
154	Passing yards	188
13–24–1	Passes	14–33–2
3–22	Sacked–yards	5–50
132	Net passing yards	138
214	Total yards	268
113	Return yards	122
9–46.1	Punts	8–42.6
3–0	Fumbles–lost	4–2
4–22	Penalties–yards	9–78
29:29	Time of possession	30:31

Individual stats

==== Week 5 (Sunday, October 2, 1983): at Chicago Bears ====
Week 5: Denver Broncos at Chicago Bears – Game summary

Quarter	1	2	3	4	Total
Broncos (2–3)	0	0	7	7	**14**
**Bears** (2–3)	14	10	0	7	**31**

at Soldier Field • Chicago, Illinois

- Date: October 2
- Game time: 11:00 a.m. MDT
- Game attendance: 58,210
- Referee: Fred Silva
- TV announcers (NBC): Charlie Jones (play–by–play) and Bob Griese (color commentator)

Team	Category	Player	Statistics
DEN	Passing		
DEN	Rushing		
DEN	Receiving		
CHI	Passing		
CHI	Rushing		
CHI	Receiving		

Scoring summary

Quarter	Time	Drive			Team	Scoring information	Score	
Quarter	Time	Plays	Yards	TOP	Team	Scoring information	DEN	CHI
1	13:49				Bears	Suhey 13-yard touchdown run, Thomas kick good	0	7
1	0:07				Bears	Gault 15-yard touchdown reception from McMahon, Thomas kick good	0	14
2	10:00	—	—	—	Bears	Interception returned 11 yards for touchdown by Frazier, Thomas kick good	0	21
2	1:07				Bears	19-yard field goal by Thomas	0	24
3	2:15				Broncos	Poole 15-yard touchdown run, Karlis kick good	7	24
4	14:32				Broncos	Upchurch 15-yard touchdown reception from DeBerg, Karlis kick good	14	24
4	14:08				Bears	Gault 72-yard touchdown reception from Evans, Thomas kick good	14	31
"TOP" = time of possession. For other American football terms, see Glossary of American football.							14	31

- Point spread:
- Over/under:
- Time of game:

Broncos	Game statistics	Bears
	First downs	
	Rushes–yards	
	Passing yards	
	Passes	
	Sacked–yards	
	Net passing yards	
	Total yards	
	Return yards	
	Punts	
	Fumbles–lost	
	Penalties–yards	
	Time of possession	

Individual stats

==== Week 6 (Sunday, October 9, 1983): at Houston Oilers ====
Week 6: Denver Broncos at Houston Oilers – Game summary

Quarter	1	2	3	4	Total
**Broncos** (3–3)	7	13	3	3	**26**
Oilers (0–6)	0	14	0	0	**14**

at Astrodome • Houston, Texas

- Date: October 9
- Game time: 11:00 a.m. MDT
- Game weather: indoors (dome)
- Game attendance: 44,209
- Referee: Fred Wyant
- TV announcers (NBC): Don Criqui (play–by–play) and Ahmad Rashad (color commentator)

Team	Category	Player	Statistics
DEN	Passing		
DEN	Rushing		
DEN	Receiving		
HOU	Passing		
HOU	Rushing		
HOU	Receiving		

Scoring summary

Quarter	Time	Drive			Team	Scoring information	Score	
Quarter	Time	Plays	Yards	TOP	Team	Scoring information	DEN	HOU
1	3:33				Broncos	Egloff 7-yard touchdown reception from DeBerg, Karlis kick good	7	0
2	14:51				Oilers	Smith 40-yard touchdown reception from Nielsen, Kempf kick good	7	7
2	11:27				Broncos	45-yard field goal by Karlis	10	7
2	4:34				Broncos	Watson 24-yard touchdown reception from DeBerg, Karlis kick good	17	7
2	2:16				Broncos	39-yard field goal by Karlis	20	7
2	1:05				Oilers	Campbell 1-yard touchdown run, Kempf kick good	20	14
3	0:32				Broncos	49-yard field goal by Karlis	23	14
4	1:57				Broncos	35-yard field goal by Karlis	26	14
"TOP" = time of possession. For other American football terms, see Glossary of American football.							26	14

- Point spread:
- Over/under:
- Time of game:

Broncos	Game statistics	Oilers
	First downs	
	Rushes–yards	
	Passing yards	
	Passes	
	Sacked–yards	
	Net passing yards	
	Total yards	
	Return yards	
	Punts	
	Fumbles–lost	
	Penalties–yards	
	Time of possession	

Individual stats

==== Week 7 (Sunday, October 16, 1983): vs. Cincinnati Bengals ====
Week 7: Cincinnati Bengals at Denver Broncos – Game summary

Quarter	1	2	3	4	Total
Bengals (1–6)	7	3	7	0	**17**
**Broncos** (4–3)	7	3	7	7	**24**

at Mile High Stadium • Denver, Colorado

- Date: October 16
- Game time: 2:00 p.m. MDT
- Game attendance: 74,305
- Referee: Jerry Markbreit
- TV announcers (NBC): Bob Costas (play–by–play) and Bob Trumpy (color commentator)

Team	Category	Player	Statistics
CIN	Passing		
CIN	Rushing		
CIN	Receiving		
DEN	Passing		
DEN	Rushing		
DEN	Receiving		

Scoring summary

Quarter	Time	Drive			Team	Scoring information	Score	
Quarter	Time	Plays	Yards	TOP	Team	Scoring information	CIN	DEN
1	5:05				Broncos	Preston 3-yard touchdown reception from DeBerg, Karlis kick good	0	7
1	0:20				Bengals	Alexander 3-yard touchdown run, Breech kick good	7	7
2	6:31				Bengals	35-yard field goal by Breech	10	7
2	1:07				Broncos	31-yard field goal by Karlis	10	10
3	7:11				Broncos	Parros 3-yard touchdown run, Karlis kick good	10	17
3	2:35	—	—	—	Bengals	Interception returned 55 yards for touchdown by Horton, Breech kick good	17	17
4	6:57				Broncos	Parros 7-yard touchdown reception from DeBerg, Karlis kick good	17	24
"TOP" = time of possession. For other American football terms, see Glossary of American football.							17	24

- Point spread:
- Over/under:
- Time of game:

Bengals	Game statistics	Broncos
	First downs	
	Rushes–yards	
	Passing yards	
	Passes	
	Sacked–yards	
	Net passing yards	
	Total yards	
	Return yards	
	Punts	
	Fumbles–lost	
	Penalties–yards	
	Time of possession	

Individual stats

==== Week 8 (Sunday, October 23, 1983): vs. San Diego Chargers ====
Week 8: San Diego Chargers at Denver Broncos – Game summary

Quarter	1	2	3	4	Total
Chargers (3–5)	0	3	3	0	**6**
**Broncos** (5–3)	0	0	0	14	**14**

at Mile High Stadium • Denver, Colorado

- Date: October 23
- Game time: 2:00 p.m. MDT
- Game attendance: 74,581
- Referee: Jim Tunney
- TV announcers (NBC): Marv Albert (play–by–play) and John Brodie (color commentator)

Team	Category	Player	Statistics
SD	Passing		
SD	Rushing		
SD	Receiving		
DEN	Passing		
DEN	Rushing		
DEN	Receiving		

Scoring summary

Quarter	Time	Drive			Team	Scoring information	Score	
Quarter	Time	Plays	Yards	TOP	Team	Scoring information	SD	DEN
2	0:23				Chargers	29-yard field goal by Benirschke	3	0
3	1:49				Chargers	30-yard field goal by Benirschke	6	0
4	12:32				Broncos	Upchurch 30-yard touchdown reception from DeBerg, Karlis kick good	6	7
4	1:42				Broncos	Preston 2-yard touchdown run, Karlis kick good	6	14
"TOP" = time of possession. For other American football terms, see Glossary of American football.							6	14

- Point spread:
- Over/under:
- Time of game:

Chargers	Game statistics	Broncos
	First downs	
	Rushes–yards	
	Passing yards	
	Passes	
	Sacked–yards	
	Net passing yards	
	Total yards	
	Return yards	
	Punts	
	Fumbles–lost	
	Penalties–yards	
	Time of possession	

Individual stats

==== Week 9 (Sunday, October 30, 1983): vs. Kansas City Chiefs ====
Week 9: Kansas City Chiefs at Denver Broncos – Game summary

Quarter	1	2	3	4	Total
Chiefs (4–5)	7	0	3	14	**24**
**Broncos** (6–3)	0	17	3	7	**27**

at Mile High Stadium • Denver, Colorado

- Date: October 30
- Game time: 2:00 p.m. MST
- Game attendance: 70,912
- Referee: Chuck Heberling
- TV announcers (NBC): Bob Costas (play–by–play) and Bob Trumpy (color commentator)

Team	Category	Player	Statistics
KC	Passing		
KC	Rushing		
KC	Receiving		
DEN	Passing		
DEN	Rushing		
DEN	Receiving		

Scoring summary

Quarter	Time	Drive			Team	Scoring information	Score	
Quarter	Time	Plays	Yards	TOP	Team	Scoring information	KC	DEN
1	5:07				Chiefs	Brown 1-yard touchdown run, Lowery kick good	7	0
2	6:11				Broncos	Poole 15-yard touchdown run, Karlis kick good	7	7
2	3:34				Broncos	31-yard field goal by Karlis	7	10
2	1:40				Broncos	Watson 46-yard touchdown reception from DeBerg, Karlis kick good	7	17
3	11:21				Chiefs	21-yard field goal by Lowery	10	17
3	5:51				Broncos	27-yard field goal by Karlis	10	20
4	8:55				Broncos	Poole 15-yard touchdown run, Karlis kick good	10	27
4	6:11				Chiefs	Jackson 9-yard touchdown run, Lowery kick good	17	27
4	1:31				Chiefs	Sampson 8-yard touchdown reception from Kenney, Lowery kick good	24	27
"TOP" = time of possession. For other American football terms, see Glossary of American football.							24	27

- Point spread:
- Over/under:
- Time of game:

Chiefs	Game statistics	Broncos
	First downs	
	Rushes–yards	
	Passing yards	
	Passes	
	Sacked–yards	
	Net passing yards	
	Total yards	
	Return yards	
	Punts	
	Fumbles–lost	
	Penalties–yards	
	Time of possession	

Individual stats

==== Week 10 (Sunday, November 6, 1983): at Seattle Seahawks ====
Week 10: Denver Broncos at Seattle Seahawks – Game summary

Quarter	1	2	3	4	Total
Broncos (6–4)	0	3	6	10	**19**
**Seahawks** (6–4)	6	0	14	7	**27**

at Kingdome • Seattle, Washington

- Date: November 6
- Game time: 2:00 p.m. MST
- Game weather: indoors (dome)
- Game attendance: 61,189
- Referee: Bob McElwee
- TV announcers (NBC): Merle Harmon (play–by–play) and Dave Rowe (color commentator)

Team	Category	Player	Statistics
DEN	Passing		
DEN	Rushing		
DEN	Receiving		
SEA	Passing		
SEA	Rushing		
SEA	Receiving		

Scoring summary

Quarter	Time	Drive			Team	Scoring information	Score	
Quarter	Time	Plays	Yards	TOP	Team	Scoring information	DEN	SEA
1	10:19				Seahawks	42-yard field goal by Johnson	0	3
1	0:52				Seahawks	18-yard field goal by Johnson	0	6
2	10:07				Broncos	38-yard field goal by Karlis	3	6
3	12:57				Seahawks	Largent 14-yard touchdown reception from Krieg, Johnson kick good	3	13
3	11:14				Seahawks	Johns 30-yard touchdown reception from Krieg, Johnson kick good	3	20
3	3:15				Broncos	Winder 1-yard touchdown run, Karlis kick no good	9	20
4	14:00				Broncos	43-yard field goal by Karlis	12	20
4	9:36				Seahawks	Krieg 10-yard touchdown run, Johnson kick good	12	27
4	6:01				Broncos	Watson 25-yard touchdown reception from Elway, Karlis kick good	19	27
"TOP" = time of possession. For other American football terms, see Glossary of American football.							19	27

- Point spread:
- Over/under:
- Time of game:

Broncos	Game statistics	Seahawks
	First downs	
	Rushes–yards	
	Passing yards	
	Passes	
	Sacked–yards	
	Net passing yards	
	Total yards	
	Return yards	
	Punts	
	Fumbles–lost	
	Penalties–yards	
	Time of possession	

Individual stats

==== Week 11 (Sunday, November 13, 1983): at Los Angeles Raiders ====
Week 11: Denver Broncos at Los Angeles Raiders – Game summary

Quarter	1	2	3	4	Total
Broncos (6–5)	10	0	0	10	**20**
**Raiders** (8–3)	0	6	7	9	**22**

at Los Angeles Memorial Coliseum • Los Angeles, California

- Date: November 13
- Game time: 2:00 p.m. MST
- Game attendance: 51,945
- Referee: Red Cashion
- TV announcers (NBC): Don Criqui (play–by–play) and Merlin Olsen (color commentator)

Team	Category	Player	Statistics
DEN	Passing	John Elway	11/31, 190 YDS, 1 INT
DEN	Rushing	John Elway	3 CAR, 32 YDS, 1 TD
DEN	Receiving	Rick Upchurch	3 REC, 63 YDS
RAI	Passing	Jim Plunkett	26/42, 252 YDS
RAI	Rushing	Marcus Allen	18 CAR, 84 YDS, 1 TD
RAI	Receiving	Todd Christensen	8 REC, 114 YDS

Scoring summary

Quarter	Time	Drive			Team	Scoring information	Score	
Quarter	Time	Plays	Yards	TOP	Team	Scoring information	DEN	RAI
1	9:24				Broncos	23-yard field goal by Karlis	3	0
1	8:26	—	—	—	Broncos	Fumble recovery returned 0 yards for touchdown by Chavous, Karlis kick good	10	0
2	12:39				Raiders	28-yard field goal by Bahr	10	3
2	0:02				Raiders	42-yard field goal by Bahr	10	6
3	5:52				Raiders	Allen 7-yard touchdown run, Bahr kick good	10	13
4	11:44				Raiders	Hawkins 17-yard touchdown run, Bahr kick no good (aborted)	10	19
4	6:35				Broncos	22-yard field goal by Karlis	13	19
4	0:58				Broncos	Elway 4-yard touchdown run, Karlis kick good	20	19
4	0:04				Raiders	39-yard field goal by Bahr	20	22
"TOP" = time of possession. For other American football terms, see Glossary of American football.							20	22

- Point spread: Broncos +7
- Over/under: 42.0 **(push)**
- Time of game:

Broncos	Game statistics	Raiders
14	First downs	23
25–63	Rushes–yards	29–140
190	Passing yards	252
11–31–1	Passes	26–43–0
2–21	Sacked–yards	5–52
169	Net passing yards	200
232	Total yards	340
91	Return yards	147
7–36.4	Punts	5–44.8
2–1	Fumbles–lost	3–3
5–29	Penalties–yards	7–57
26:30	Time of possession	33:30

Individual stats

==== Week 12 (Sunday, November 20, 1983): vs. Seattle Seahawks ====
Week 12: Seattle Seahawks at Denver Broncos – Game summary

Quarter	1	2	3	4	Total
Seahawks (6–6)	0	7	13	7	**27**
**Broncos** (7–5)	10	10	7	11	**38**

at Mile High Stadium • Denver, Colorado

- Date: November 20
- Game time: 2:00 p.m. MST
- Game attendance: 74,581
- Referee: Gene Barth
- TV announcers (NBC): Marv Albert (play–by–play) and John Brodie (color commentator)

Team	Category	Player	Statistics
SEA	Passing		
SEA	Rushing		
SEA	Receiving		
DEN	Passing		
DEN	Rushing		
DEN	Receiving		

Scoring summary

Quarter	Time	Drive			Team	Scoring information	Score	
Quarter	Time	Plays	Yards	TOP	Team	Scoring information	SEA	DEN
1	12:34				Broncos	42-yard field goal by Karlis	0	3
1	3:00				Broncos	Watson 78-yard touchdown reception from Kubiak, Karlis kick good	0	10
2	7:04				Broncos	25-yard field goal by Karlis	0	13
2	1:52				Broncos	Willhite 24-yard touchdown run, Karlis kick good	0	20
2	11:14				Seahawks	Walker 50-yard touchdown reception from Krieg, Johnson kick good	7	20
3	10:57				Broncos	Kubiak 7-yard touchdown run, Karlis kick good	7	27
3	5:39				Seahawks	Hughes 1-yard touchdown run, Johnson kick good	14	27
3	1:12				Seahawks	Metzelaars 17-yard touchdown reception from Krieg, Johnson kick no good	20	27
4	10:28				Broncos	21-yard field goal by Karlis	20	30
4	7:40				Broncos	38-yard field goal by Karlis	20	33
4	4:35				Seahawks	Young 11-yard touchdown reception from Krieg, Johnson kick good	27	33
4	1:39	—	—	—	Broncos	Krieg tackled in end zone for a safety by Jones	27	35
4	1:08				Broncos	40-yard field goal by Karlis	27	38
"TOP" = time of possession. For other American football terms, see Glossary of American football.							27	38

- Point spread:
- Over/under:
- Time of game:

Seahawks	Game statistics	Broncos
	First downs	
	Rushes–yards	
	Passing yards	
	Passes	
	Sacked–yards	
	Net passing yards	
	Total yards	
	Return yards	
	Punts	
	Fumbles–lost	
	Penalties–yards	
	Time of possession	

Individual stats

==== Week 13 (Sunday, November 27, 1983): at San Diego Chargers ====
Week 13: Denver Broncos at San Diego Chargers – Game summary

Quarter	1	2	3	4	Total
Broncos (7–6)	7	0	0	0	**7**
**Chargers** (5–8)	14	7	0	10	**31**

at Jack Murphy Stadium • San Diego, California

- Date: November 27
- Game time: 2:00 p.m. MST
- Game attendance: 43,650
- Referee: Gordon McCarter
- TV announcers (NBC): Don Criqui (play–by–play) and Gene Washington (color commentator)

Team	Category	Player	Statistics
DEN	Passing		
DEN	Rushing		
DEN	Receiving		
SD	Passing		
SD	Rushing		
SD	Receiving		

Scoring summary

Quarter	Time	Drive			Team	Scoring information	Score	
Quarter	Time	Plays	Yards	TOP	Team	Scoring information	DEN	SD
1	10:59				Broncos	Poole 1-yard touchdown run, Karlis kick good	7	0
1	4:54				Chargers	Winslow 9-yard touchdown reception from Fouts, Benirschke kick good	7	7
1	1:29				Chargers	Winslow 2-yard touchdown reception from Fouts, Benirschke kick good	7	14
2	8:51				Chargers	Brooks 3-yard touchdown run, Benirschke kick good	7	21
4	14:43				Chargers	Muncie 1-yard touchdown run, Benirschke kick good	7	28
4	6:29				Chargers	20-yard field goal by Benirschke	7	31
"TOP" = time of possession. For other American football terms, see Glossary of American football.							7	31

- Point spread:
- Over/under:
- Time of game:

Broncos	Game statistics	Chargers
	First downs	
	Rushes–yards	
	Passing yards	
	Passes	
	Sacked–yards	
	Net passing yards	
	Total yards	
	Return yards	
	Punts	
	Fumbles–lost	
	Penalties–yards	
	Time of possession	

Individual stats

==== Week 14 (Sunday, December 4, 1983): vs. Cleveland Browns ====
Week 14: Cleveland Browns at Denver Broncos – Game summary

Quarter	1	2	3	4	Total
Browns (8–6)	3	3	0	0	**6**
**Broncos** (8–6)	0	21	3	3	**27**

at Mile High Stadium • Denver, Colorado

- Date: December 4
- Game time: 2:00 p.m. MST
- Game attendance: 70,912
- Referee: Pat Haggerty
- TV announcers (NBC): Marv Albert (play–by–play) and John Brodie (color commentator)

Team	Category	Player	Statistics
CLE	Passing		
CLE	Rushing		
CLE	Receiving		
DEN	Passing		
DEN	Rushing		
DEN	Receiving		

Scoring summary

Quarter	Time	Drive			Team	Scoring information	Score	
Quarter	Time	Plays	Yards	TOP	Team	Scoring information	CLE	DEN
1	9:57				Browns	47-yard field goal by Bahr	3	0
2	14:29				Broncos	Winder 3-yard touchdown run, Karlis kick good	3	7
2	5:27				Broncos	Sampson 39-yard touchdown reception from Elway, Karlis kick good	3	14
2	1:03				Broncos	Sampson 49-yard touchdown reception from Elway, Karlis kick good	3	21
2	0:02				Browns	58-yard field goal by Cox	6	21
3	7:01				Broncos	20-yard field goal by Karlis	6	24
4	8:02				Broncos	50-yard field goal by Karlis	6	27
"TOP" = time of possession. For other American football terms, see Glossary of American football.							6	27

- Point spread:
- Over/under:
- Time of game:

Browns	Game statistics	Broncos
	First downs	
	Rushes–yards	
	Passing yards	
	Passes	
	Sacked–yards	
	Net passing yards	
	Total yards	
	Return yards	
	Punts	
	Fumbles–lost	
	Penalties–yards	
	Time of possession	

Individual stats

==== Week 15 (Sunday, December 11, 1983): vs. Baltimore Colts ====
Week 15: Baltimore Colts at Denver Broncos – Game summary

Quarter	1	2	3	4	Total
Colts (6–9)	3	13	3	0	**19**
**Broncos** (9–6)	0	0	0	21	**21**

at Mile High Stadium • Denver, Colorado

- Date: December 11
- Game time: 2:00 p.m. MST
- Game weather: 40 °F (4 °C)
- Game attendance: 74,864
- Referee: Fred Silva
- TV announcers (NBC): Jay Randolph (play–by–play) and Bob Chandler (color commentator)

Team	Category	Player	Statistics
BAL	Passing	Mike Pagel	13/27, 217 YDS, 1 TD, 1 INT
BAL	Rushing	Curtis Dickey	19 CAR, 92 YDS
BAL	Receiving	Bernard Henry	8 REC, 169 YDS, 1 TD
DEN	Passing	John Elway	23/44, 345 yards, 3 TDs
DEN	Rushing	John Elway	3 CAR, 23 YDS
DEN	Receiving	Steve Watson	4 REC, 98 YDS

Scoring summary

Quarter	Time	Drive			Team	Scoring information	Score	
Quarter	Time	Plays	Yards	TOP	Team	Scoring information	BAL	DEN
1	1:20				Colts	42-yard field goal by Allegre	3	0
2	10:55				Colts	55-yard field goal by Allegre	6	0
2	7:23				Colts	41-yard field goal by Allegre	9	0
2	5:55				Broncos	Henry 40-yard touchdown reception from Pagel, Allegre kick good	16	0
3	7:50				Colts	26-yard field goal by Allegre	19	0
4	10:52				Broncos	Sampson 21-yard touchdown reception from Elway, Karlis kick good	19	7
4	4:54				Broncos	Myles 26-yard touchdown reception from Elway, Karlis kick good	19	14
4	0:44				Broncos	Willhite 26-yard touchdown reception from Elway, Karlis kick good	19	21
"TOP" = time of possession. For other American football terms, see Glossary of American football.							19	21

- Point spread:
- Over/under:
- Time of game:

Colts	Game statistics	Broncos
	First downs	
	Rushes–yards	
	Passing yards	
	Passes	
	Sacked–yards	
	Net passing yards	
	Total yards	
	Return yards	
	Punts	
	Fumbles–lost	
	Penalties–yards	
	Time of possession	

Individual stats

==== Week 16 (Sunday, December 18, 1983): at Kansas City Chiefs ====
Week 16: Denver Broncos at Kansas City Chiefs – Game summary

Quarter	1	2	3	4	Total
Broncos (9–7)	0	3	0	14	**17**
**Chiefs** (6–10)	21	7	10	10	**48**

at Arrowhead Stadium • Kansas City, Missouri

- Date: December 18
- Game time: 11:00 a.m. MST
- Game attendance: 11,377
- Referee: Tom Dooley
- TV announcers (NBC): Phil Stone (play–by–play) and Jim Turner (color commentator)

Team	Category	Player	Statistics
DEN	Passing		
DEN	Rushing		
DEN	Receiving		
KC	Passing		
KC	Rushing		
KC	Receiving		

Scoring summary

Quarter	Time	Drive			Team	Scoring information	Score	
Quarter	Time	Plays	Yards	TOP	Team	Scoring information	DEN	KC
1	13:53	—	—	—	Chiefs	Interception returned 58 yards for touchdown by Smith, Lowery kick good	0	7
1	7:47				Chiefs	Sampson 48-yard touchdown reception from Kenney, Lowery kick good	0	14
1	5:00				Chiefs	Scott 17-yard touchdown reception from Kenney, Lowery kick good	0	21
2	12:21				Broncos	24-yard field goal by Karlis	3	21
2	4:27				Chiefs	Brown 1-yard touchdown run, Lowery kick good	3	28
3	7:00				Chiefs	38-yard field goal by Lowery	3	31
3	2:10				Chiefs	Brown 6-yard touchdown run, Lowery kick good	3	38
4	11:56				Chiefs	43-yard field goal by Lowery	3	41
4	8:57				Broncos	Willhite 1-yard touchdown run, Karlis kick good	10	41
4	8:35				Broncos	Willhite 2-yard touchdown run, Karlis kick good	17	41
4	1:53				Chiefs	Paige 23-yard touchdown reception from Blackledge, Lowery kick good	17	48
"TOP" = time of possession. For other American football terms, see Glossary of American football.							17	48

- Point spread:
- Over/under:
- Time of game:

Broncos	Game statistics	Chiefs
	First downs	
	Rushes–yards	
	Passing yards	
	Passes	
	Sacked–yards	
	Net passing yards	
	Total yards	
	Return yards	
	Punts	
	Fumbles–lost	
	Penalties–yards	
	Time of possession	

Individual stats

=== Standings ===
AFC West
	W	L	T	PCT	DIV	CONF	PF	PA	STK
^{(1)} Los Angeles Raiders	12	4	0	.750	6–2	10–2	442	338	W1
^{(4)} Seattle Seahawks	9	7	0	.563	5–3	8–4	403	397	W2
^{(5)} Denver Broncos	9	7	0	.563	3–5	9–5	302	327	L1
San Diego Chargers	6	10	0	.375	4–4	4–8	358	462	L1
Kansas City Chiefs	6	10	0	.375	2–6	4–8	386	367	W1

== Playoffs ==
Round	Date	Opponent (seed)	Result	Record	Venue	Attendance
AFC Wild Card Playoffs	December 24	at Seattle Seahawks (4)	L 7–31	0–1	Kingdome	60,752

=== Playoff game summaries ===
==== 1983 AFC Wild Card Playoffs (Saturday, December 24, 1983): at (4) Seattle Seahawks ====
AFC Wild Card Playoffs: Denver Broncos at Seattle Seahawks – Game summary

Quarter	1	2	3	4	Total
Broncos (0–1)	7	0	0	0	7
Seahawks (1–0)	7	3	7	14	31

at Kingdome • Seattle, Washington

- Date: December 24
- Game time: 2:00 p.m. MST
- Game weather: indoors (dome)
- Game attendance: 60,752
- Referee: Red Cashion
- TV announcers (NBC): Charlie Jones (play–by–play), Bob Griese (color commentator) and Ahmad Rashad (sideline reporter)

Team	Category	Player	Statistics
DEN	Passing	Steve DeBerg	14/19, 131 YDS, 1 TD, 1 INT
DEN	Rushing	Sammy Winder	16 CAR, 59 YDS
DEN	Receiving	Jesse Myles	7 REC, 73 YDS, 1 TD
SEA	Passing	Dave Krieg	12/13, 200 YDS, 3 TDs
SEA	Rushing	Curt Warner	23 CAR, 99 YDS
SEA	Receiving	Steve Largent	4 REC, 76 YDS, 1 TD

Scoring summary

Quarter	Time	Drive			Team	Scoring information	Score	
Quarter	Time	Plays	Yards	TOP	Team	Scoring information	DEN	SEA
1	10:18	8	62	4:33	Seahawks	Largent 17-yard touchdown reception from Krieg, Johnson kick good	0	7
1	3:38	9	76	4:08	Broncos	Myles 13-yard touchdown reception from DeBerg, Karlis kick good	7	7
2	9:25	9	32	4:33	Seahawks	37-yard field goal by Johnson	7	10
3	6:58	5	73	3:19	Seahawks	Metzelaars 5-yard touchdown reception from Krieg, Johnson kick good	7	17
4	14:56	9	61	4:17	Seahawks	Johns 18-yard touchdown reception from Krieg, Johnson kick good	7	24
4	9:34	9	64	4:43	Seahawks	Hughes 2-yard touchdown run, Johnson kick good	7	31
"TOP" = time of possession. For other American football terms, see Glossary of American football.							7	31

- Point spread:
- Over/under:
- Time of game: 2 hours, 53 minutes

Broncos	Game statistics	Seahawks
21	First downs	17
33–125	Rushes–yards	38–145
254	Passing yards	200
24–34–2	Passes	12–13–0
2–19	Sacked–yards	2–21
233	Net passing yards	179
360	Total yards	324
128	Return yards	146
4–47.8	Punts	3–41.7
1–1	Fumbles–lost	1–0
5–35	Penalties–yards	3–34
30:57	Time of possession	29:03

Individual stats

Playoff Game Officials

Playoff
Round	Opponent	Referee	Umpire	Head Linesman	Line Judge	Back Judge	Side Judge	Field Judge	Alternate
Wild Card	at Seattle	(43) Red Cashion	(67) John Keck	(109) Sid Semon	(41) Dick McKenzie	(28) Don Wedge	(90) Gil Mace	(84) Bob Wortman	
