= 1982 Denver Broncos season =

American football team season

- Owner: Edgar Kaiser
- General manager: Grady Alderman
- Head coach: Dan Reeves
- Home stadium: Mile High Stadium

Results
- Record: 2–7
- Division place: 12th AFC
- Playoffs: Did not qualify

The 1982 Denver Broncos season was the team's 23rd year in professional football and its 13th with the National Football League (NFL). The Broncos played only nine games this season, owing to the strike imposed by the National Football League Players Association (NFLPA). The Broncos were looking to improve on their 10–6 record from 1981. But due to many injuries plus the strike, the Broncos only won two games and lost seven. This was their worst record since 1971, their first losing season since 1975, and their first with fewer than three wins since 1964. Both of the Broncos’ wins came against interconference teams, and the team only won one home game the entire season, against the reigning Super Bowl champion San Francisco 49ers. Their only other win was against the Los Angeles Rams. The Broncos went winless against AFC foes in 1982, although all their non-division AFC games (Note: The Broncos were scheduled to play the Steelers and Bills at home and the Jets and Oilers — who finished 1–8 — away.) were cancelled by the strike.

== NFL draft ==
1982 Denver Broncos draft
Round	Pick	Player	Position	College	Notes
1	21	Gerald Willhite	RB	San Jose State	
2	50	Orlando McDaniel	WR	LSU	
4	106	Dan Plater	WR	BYU	
5	131	Sammy Winder *	RB	Southern Mississippi	
7	189	Alvin Ruben	DE	Houston	
9	243	Keith Uecker	OT	Auburn	
10	274	Ken Woodard	LB	Tuskegee	
11	300	Stuart Yatsko	G	Oregon	
12	327	Brian Clark	G	Clemson	
Made roster † Pro Football Hall of Fame * Made at least one Pro Bowl during career

=== Undrafted free agents ===
1982 undrafted free agents of note
Player	Position	College
Tim Koegel	Quarterback	Notre Dame
Danny Rich	Linebacker	Weber State

== Personnel ==
=== Staff ===
1982 Denver Broncos staff
Front office: Owner – Edgar Kaiser; General Manager – Grady Alderman; Director of Player Personnel – John Beake; Coordinator of College Scouting – Carroll Hardy; Coordinator of Pro Scouting – Reed Johnson; Head coaches: Head Coach – Dan Reeves; Assistant Head Coach/Defense – Joe Collier; Special Assistant – Marvin Bass; Offensive coaches: Offensive Coordinator/Wide Receivers – Rod Dowhower; Running Backs – Nick Nicolau; Offensive Line – Jerry Frei	Defensive coaches: Defensive Line – Stan Jones; Linebackers – Bob Zeman; Defensive Backs – Richie McCabe; Special teams coaches: Special Teams/Tight Ends – Fran Polsfoot

=== Roster ===
1982 Denver Broncos roster
Quarterbacks (QB): 17 Steve DeBerg; 10 Mark Herrmann; 7 Craig Morton; Running backs (RB): 41 Rob Lytle; 24 Rick Parros; 34 Nathan Poole; 46 Dave Preston; 47 Gerald Willhite; 23 Sammy Winder; Wide receivers (WR): 83 Wade Manning; 82 Orlando McDaniel; 80 Rick Upchurch; 81 Steve Watson; Tight ends (TE): 85 Ron Egloff; 88 Riley Odoms; 87 James Wright	Offensive linemen (OL): 54 Keith Bishop C/G; 64 Billy Bryan C; 78 Brian Clark T; 62 Tom Glassic G; 60 Paul Howard G; 76 Ken Lanier T; 71 Claudie Minor T; 70 Dave Studdard G; 67 Keith Uecker T; Defensive linemen (DL): 77 Greg Boyd DE; 68 Rubin Carter NT; 79 Barney Chavous DE; 75 Rulon Jones DE; 72 Don Latimer NT; 66 Brison Manor DE	Linebackers (LB): 58 Steve Busick ILB; 59 Darren Comeaux ILB; 55 Rick Dennison OLB; 56 Larry Evans ILB; 53 Randy Gradishar ILB; 57 Tom Jackson OLB; 50 Jim Ryan OLB; 51 Bob Swenson OLB; 52 Ken Woodard OLB; Defensive backs (DB): 28 Roger Jackson CB; 22 Aaron Kyle CB/FS; 49 Dennis Smith SS; 26 J. T. Thomas SS; 37 Steve Trimble FS/CB; 45 Steve Wilson CB; 20 Louis Wright CB; Special teams (ST): 3 Rich Karlis K; 11 Luke Prestridge P	Reserve: 43 Steve Foley S (IR); 31 Mike Harden S (IR); Rookies in italics

== Preseason ==
=== Schedule ===
Week	Date	Opponent	Result	Record	Venue	Attendance
1	August 14	at Los Angeles Rams	W 33–20	1–0	Anaheim Stadium	57,482
2	August 21	Miami Dolphins	W 17–14	2–0	Mile High Stadium	77,465
3	August 28	Minnesota Vikings	W 27–17	3–0	Mile High Stadium	73,371
4	September 4	at New York Jets	W 20–13	4–0	Giants Stadium	43,820

== Regular season ==
=== Schedule ===
Week	Date	Opponent	Result	Record	Venue	Attendance
1	September 12	**San Diego Chargers**	**L** 3–23	0–1	Mile High Stadium	73,564
2	September 19	San Francisco 49ers	**W** 24–21	1–1	Mile High Stadium	73,899
—N/a	September 26	at New Orleans Saints	Cancelled due to the NFLPA Players' strike †			
—N/a	October 3	Pittsburgh Steelers	Cancelled due to the NFLPA Players' strike †			
—N/a	October 10	at New York Jets	Cancelled due to the NFLPA Players' strike †			
—N/a	October 17	at Houston Oilers	Cancelled due to the NFLPA Players' strike †			
—N/a	October 24	**Los Angeles Raiders**	Cancelled due to the NFLPA Players' strike †			
—N/a	October 31	Buffalo Bills	Cancelled due to the NFLPA Players' strike †			
—N/a	November 7	at **Seattle Seahawks**	**Postponed until January 2, 1983 due to the NFLPA Players' strike**			
—N/a	November 14	at **Kansas City Chiefs**	Cancelled due to the NFLPA Players' strike †			
10	November 21	**Seattle Seahawks**	**L** 10–17	1–2	Mile High Stadium	73,996
11	November 28	at **San Diego Chargers**	**L** 20–30	1–3	Jack Murphy Stadium	47,629
12	December 5	Atlanta Falcons	**L** 27–34	1–4	Mile High Stadium	73,984
13	December 12	at Los Angeles Rams	**W** 27–24	2–4	Anaheim Stadium	48,112
14	December 19	**Kansas City Chiefs**	**L** 16–37	2–5	Mile High Stadium	74,192
15	December 26	at **Los Angeles Raiders**	**L** 10–27	2–6	Los Angeles Memorial Coliseum	44,160
16	January 2, 1983	at **Seattle Seahawks**	**L** 11–13	2–7	Kingdome	43,145
Note: Intra-division opponents are in **bold** text.

=== Game summaries ===
==== Week 1 (Sunday, September 12, 1982): vs. San Diego Chargers ====
Week 1: San Diego Chargers at Denver Broncos – Game summary

Quarter	1	2	3	4	Total
**Chargers**	3	3	10	7	**23**
Broncos	0	3	0	0	**3**

at Mile High Stadium • Denver, Colorado

- Date: September 12
- Game time: 2:00 p.m. MDT
- Game attendance: 73,564
- Referee: Jim Tunney
- TV announcers (NBC): Marv Albert (play–by–play) and Jim Turner (color commentator)

Team	Category	Player	Statistics
SD	Passing		
SD	Rushing		
SD	Receiving		
DEN	Passing		
DEN	Rushing		
DEN	Receiving		

Scoring summary

Quarter	Time	Drive			Team	Scoring information	Score	
Quarter	Time	Plays	Yards	TOP	Team	Scoring information	SD	DEN
1					Chargers	50-yard field goal by Benirschke	3	0
2					Broncos	40-yard field goal by Karlis	3	3
2					Chargers	24-yard field goal by Benirschke	6	3
3					Chargers	40-yard field goal by Benirschke	9	3
3					Chargers	Fitzkee 18-yard touchdown reception from Fouts, Benirschke kick good	16	3
4					Chargers	Muncie 10-yard touchdown run, Benirschke kick good	23	3
"TOP" = time of possession. For other American football terms, see Glossary of American football.							23	3

- Point spread:
- Over/under:
- Time of game:

Chargers	Game statistics	Broncos
	First downs	
	Rushes–yards	
	Passing yards	
	Passes	
	Sacked–yards	
	Net passing yards	
	Total yards	
	Return yards	
	Punts	
	Fumbles–lost	
	Penalties–yards	
	Time of possession	

Individual stats

==== Week 2 (Sunday, September 19, 1982): vs. San Francisco 49ers ====
Week 2: San Francisco 49ers at Denver Broncos – Game summary

Quarter	1	2	3	4	Total
49ers	14	7	0	0	**21**
**Broncos**	7	7	0	10	**24**

at Mile High Stadium • Denver, Colorado

- Date: September 19
- Game time: 2:00 p.m. MDT
- Game attendance: 73,899
- Referee: Chuck Heberling
- TV announcers (CBS): Pat Summerall (play–by–play) and John Madden (color commentator)

Team	Category	Player	Statistics
SF	Passing		
SF	Rushing		
SF	Receiving		
DEN	Passing		
DEN	Rushing		
DEN	Receiving		

Scoring summary

Quarter	Time	Drive			Team	Scoring information	Score	
Quarter	Time	Plays	Yards	TOP	Team	Scoring information	SF	DEN
1					49ers	Solomon 46-yard touchdown reception from Montana, Wersching kick good	7	0
1		—	—	—	Broncos	Upchurch 67-yard punt return for a touchdown, Karlis kick good	7	7
1					49ers	Moore 1-yard touchdown run, Wersching kick good	14	7
2					Broncos	Parros 4-yard touchdown reception from DeBerg, Karlis kick good	14	14
2					49ers	Clark 24-yard touchdown reception from Montana, Wersching kick good	21	14
4					Broncos	Upchurch 37-yard touchdown reception from DeBerg, Karlis kick good	21	21
4					Broncos	18-yard field goal by Karlis	21	24
"TOP" = time of possession. For other American football terms, see Glossary of American football.							21	24

- Point spread:
- Over/under:
- Time of game:

49ers	Game statistics	Broncos
	First downs	
	Rushes–yards	
	Passing yards	
	Passes	
	Sacked–yards	
	Net passing yards	
	Total yards	
	Return yards	
	Punts	
	Fumbles–lost	
	Penalties–yards	
	Time of possession	

Individual stats

==== Week 10 (Sunday, November 21, 1982): vs. Seattle Seahawks ====
Week 10: Seattle Seahawks at Denver Broncos – Game summary

Quarter	1	2	3	4	Total
**Seahawks**	0	0	7	10	**17**
Broncos	0	7	3	0	**10**

at Mile High Stadium • Denver, Colorado

- Date: November 21
- Game time: 2:00 p.m. MST
- Game attendance: 73,966
- Referee: Jerry Seeman
- TV announcers (NBC): Charlie Jones (play–by–play) and Len Dawson (color commentator)

Team	Category	Player	Statistics
SEA	Passing		
SEA	Rushing		
SEA	Receiving		
DEN	Passing		
DEN	Rushing		
DEN	Receiving		

Scoring summary

Quarter	Time	Drive			Team	Scoring information	Score	
Quarter	Time	Plays	Yards	TOP	Team	Scoring information	SEA	DEN
2					Broncos	Willhite 15-yard touchdown run, Karlis kick good	0	7
3		—	—	—	Seahawks	Interception returned 31 yards for touchdown by Scholtz, Johnson kick good	7	7
3					Broncos	21-yard field goal by Karlis	7	10
4					Seahawks	25-yard field goal by Johnson	10	10
4					Seahawks	Largent 34-yard touchdown reception from Zorn, Johnson kick good	17	10
"TOP" = time of possession. For other American football terms, see Glossary of American football.							17	10

- Point spread:
- Over/under:
- Time of game:

Seahawks	Game statistics	Broncos
	First downs	
	Rushes–yards	
	Passing yards	
	Passes	
	Sacked–yards	
	Net passing yards	
	Total yards	
	Return yards	
	Punts	
	Fumbles–lost	
	Penalties–yards	
	Time of possession	

Individual stats

==== Week 11 (Sunday, November 28, 1982): at San Diego Chargers ====
Week 11: Denver Broncos at San Diego Chargers – Game summary

Quarter	1	2	3	4	Total
Broncos	3	7	7	3	**20**
**Chargers**	0	17	3	10	**30**

at Jack Murphy Stadium • San Diego, California

- Date: November 28
- Game time: 2:00 p.m. MST
- Game attendance: 47,629
- Referee: Jerry Markbreit
- TV announcers (NBC): Don Criqui (play–by–play) and John Brodie (color commentator)

Team	Category	Player	Statistics
DEN	Passing		
DEN	Rushing		
DEN	Receiving		
SD	Passing		
SD	Rushing		
SD	Receiving		

Scoring summary

Quarter	Time	Drive			Team	Scoring information	Score	
Quarter	Time	Plays	Yards	TOP	Team	Scoring information	DEN	SD
1					Broncos	27-yard field goal by Karlis	3	0
2					Chargers	Winslow 3-yard touchdown reception from Fouts, Benirschke kick good	3	7
2					Chargers	41-yard field goal by Benirschke	3	10
2					Chargers	Winslow 28-yard touchdown reception from Fouts, Benirschke kick good	3	17
2					Broncos	Upchurch 16-yard touchdown reception from DeBerg, Karlis kick good	10	17
3					Broncos	DeBerg 6-yard touchdown run, Karlis kick good	17	17
3					Chargers	18-yard field goal by Benirschke	17	20
4					Broncos	38-yard field goal by Karlis	20	20
4					Chargers	Winslow 2-yard touchdown reception from Fouts, Benirschke kick good	20	27
4					Chargers	42-yard field goal by Benirschke	20	30
"TOP" = time of possession. For other American football terms, see Glossary of American football.							20	30

- Point spread:
- Over/under:
- Time of game:

Broncos	Game statistics	Chargers
	First downs	
	Rushes–yards	
	Passing yards	
	Passes	
	Sacked–yards	
	Net passing yards	
	Total yards	
	Return yards	
	Punts	
	Fumbles–lost	
	Penalties–yards	
	Time of possession	

Individual stats

==== Week 12 (Sunday, December 5, 1982): vs. Atlanta Falcons ====
Week 12: Atlanta Falcons at Denver Broncos – Game summary

Quarter	1	2	3	4	Total
**Falcons** (3–2)	7	7	10	10	**34**
Broncos (1–4)	14	3	3	7	**27**

at Mile High Stadium • Denver, Colorado

- Date: December 5
- Game time: 2:00 p.m. MST
- Game attendance: 73,984
- Referee: Gene Barth
- TV announcers (CBS): Jack Buck (play–by–play) and Hank Stram (color commentator)

Team	Category	Player	Statistics
ATL	Passing		
ATL	Rushing		
ATL	Receiving		
DEN	Passing		
DEN	Rushing		
DEN	Receiving		

Scoring summary

Quarter	Time	Drive			Team	Scoring information	Score	
Quarter	Time	Plays	Yards	TOP	Team	Scoring information	ATL	DEN
1					Falcons	Andrews 8-yard touchdown run, Luckhurst kick good	7	0
1					Broncos	Winder 3-yard touchdown run, Karlis kick good	7	7
1					Broncos	Watson 6-yard touchdown reception from DeBerg, Karlis kick good	7	14
2					Falcons	Miller 9-yard touchdown reception from Bartkowski, Luckhurst kick good	14	14
2					Broncos	31-yard field goal by Karlis	14	17
3					Broncos	26-yard field goal by Karlis	14	20
3					Falcons	Andrews 86-yard touchdown reception from Bartkowski, Luckhurst kick good	21	20
3					Falcons	51-yard field goal by Luckhurst	24	20
4					Falcons	51-yard field goal by Luckhurst	27	20
4					Falcons	Andrews 2-yard touchdown run, Luckhurst kick good	34	20
4					Broncos	Wright 6-yard touchdown reception from DeBerg, Karlis kick good	34	27
"TOP" = time of possession. For other American football terms, see Glossary of American football.							34	27

- Point spread:
- Over/under:
- Time of game:

Falcons	Game statistics	Broncos
	First downs	
	Rushes–yards	
	Passing yards	
	Passes	
	Sacked–yards	
	Net passing yards	
	Total yards	
	Return yards	
	Punts	
	Fumbles–lost	
	Penalties–yards	
	Time of possession	

Individual stats

==== Week 13 (Sunday, December 12, 1982): at Los Angeles Rams ====
Week 13: Denver Broncos at Los Angeles Rams – Game summary

Quarter	1	2	3	4	Total
**Broncos**	0	14	3	10	**27**
Rams	7	14	0	3	**24**

at Anaheim Stadium • Anaheim, California

- Date: December 12
- Game time: 2:00 p.m. MST
- Game attendance: 48,112
- Referee: Bob McElwee
- TV announcers (NBC): Phil Stone (play–by–play) and Gene Washington (color commentator)

Team	Category	Player	Statistics
DEN	Passing		
DEN	Rushing		
DEN	Receiving		
RAM	Passing		
RAM	Rushing		
RAM	Receiving		

Scoring summary

Quarter	Time	Drive			Team	Scoring information	Score	
Quarter	Time	Plays	Yards	TOP	Team	Scoring information	DEN	RAM
1					Rams	Guman 1-yard touchdown run, Lansford kick good	0	7
2					Rams	Tyler 1-yard touchdown run, Lansford kick good	0	14
2					Rams	Cromwell 17-yard touchdown run, Lansford kick good	0	21
2					Broncos	Upchurch 51-yard touchdown reception from DeBerg, Karlis kick good	7	21
2					Broncos	Parros 7-yard touchdown reception from DeBerg, Karlis kick good	14	21
3					Broncos	47-yard field goal by Karlis	17	21
4					Broncos	18-yard field goal by Karlis	20	21
4					Broncos	Parros 2-yard touchdown run, Karlis kick good	27	21
4					Rams	39-yard field goal by Lansford	27	24
"TOP" = time of possession. For other American football terms, see Glossary of American football.							27	24

- Point spread:
- Over/under:
- Time of game:

Broncos	Game statistics	Rams
	First downs	
	Rushes–yards	
	Passing yards	
	Passes	
	Sacked–yards	
	Net passing yards	
	Total yards	
	Return yards	
	Punts	
	Fumbles–lost	
	Penalties–yards	
	Time of possession	

Individual stats

==== Week 14 (Sunday, December 19, 1982): vs. Kansas City Chiefs ====
Week 14: Kansas City Chiefs at Denver Broncos – Game summary

Quarter	1	2	3	4	Total
**Chiefs**	3	7	10	17	**37**
Broncos	0	13	3	0	**16**

at Mile High Stadium • Denver, Colorado

- Date: December 19
- Game time: 2:00 p.m. MST
- Game attendance: 74,192
- Referee: Jim Tunney
- TV announcers (NBC): Marv Albert (play–by–play) and Bob Trumpy (color commentator)

Team	Category	Player	Statistics
KC	Passing		
KC	Rushing		
KC	Receiving		
DEN	Passing		
DEN	Rushing		
DEN	Receiving		

Scoring summary

Quarter	Time	Drive			Team	Scoring information	Score	
Quarter	Time	Plays	Yards	TOP	Team	Scoring information	KC	DEN
1					Chiefs	47-yard field goal by Lowery	3	0
2		—	—	—	Chiefs	Interception returned 56 yards for touchdown by Harris, Lowery kick good	10	0
2					Broncos	Willhite 2-yard touchdown run, Karlis kick no good	10	6
2		—	—	—	Broncos	Upchurch 78-yard punt return for a touchdown, Karlis kick good	10	13
3					Broncos	44-yard field goal by Karlis	17	16
3					Chiefs	19-yard field goal by Lowery	20	16
4					Chiefs	22-yard field goal by Lowery	23	16
4					Chiefs	Carson 33-yard touchdown reception from Kenney, Lowery kick good	30	16
4		—	—	—	Chiefs	Interception returned 43 yards for touchdown by Barbaro, Lowery kick good	37	16
"TOP" = time of possession. For other American football terms, see Glossary of American football.							37	16

- Point spread:
- Over/under:
- Time of game:

Chiefs	Game statistics	Broncos
	First downs	
	Rushes–yards	
	Passing yards	
	Passes	
	Sacked–yards	
	Net passing yards	
	Total yards	
	Return yards	
	Punts	
	Fumbles–lost	
	Penalties–yards	
	Time of possession	

Individual stats

==== Week 15 (Sunday, December 26, 1982): at Los Angeles Raiders ====
Week 15: Denver Broncos at Los Angeles Raiders – Game summary

Quarter	1	2	3	4	Total
Broncos	0	0	0	10	**10**
**Raiders**	3	24	0	0	**27**

at Los Angeles Memorial Coliseum • Los Angeles, California

- Date: December 26
- Game time: 2:00 p.m. MST
- Game attendance: 44,160
- Referee: Red Cashion
- TV announcers (NBC): Dick Enberg (play–by–play) and Merlin Olsen (color commentator)

Team	Category	Player	Statistics
DEN	Passing		
DEN	Rushing		
DEN	Receiving		
RAI	Passing		
RAI	Rushing		
RAI	Receiving		

Scoring summary

Quarter	Time	Drive			Team	Scoring information	Score	
Quarter	Time	Plays	Yards	TOP	Team	Scoring information	DEN	RAI
1					Raiders	19-yard field goal by Bahr	0	3
2					Raiders	Allen 4-yard touchdown reception from Plunkett, Bahr kick good	0	10
3					Raiders	King 5-yard touchdown run, Bahr kick good	0	17
2					Raiders	Allen 51-yard touchdown reception from Plunkett, Bahr kick good	0	24
2					Raiders	36-yard field goal by Bahr	0	27
4					Broncos	31-yard field goal by Karlis	3	27
4					Broncos	Watson 18-yard touchdown reception from Herrmann, Karlis kick good	10	27
"TOP" = time of possession. For other American football terms, see Glossary of American football.							10	27

- Point spread:
- Over/under:
- Time of game:

Broncos	Game statistics	Raiders
	First downs	
	Rushes–yards	
	Passing yards	
	Passes	
	Sacked–yards	
	Net passing yards	
	Total yards	
	Return yards	
	Punts	
	Fumbles–lost	
	Penalties–yards	
	Time of possession	

Individual stats

==== Week 16 (Sunday, January 2, 1983): at Seattle Seahawks ====
Week 16: Denver Broncos at Seattle Seahawks – Game summary

Quarter	1	2	3	4	Total
Broncos	2	0	7	2	**11**
**Seahawks**	3	0	0	10	**13**

at Kingdome • Seattle, Washington

- Date: January 2
- Game time: 2:00 p.m. MST
- Game weather: indoors (dome)
- Game attendance: 43,415
- Referee: Fred Wyant
- TV announcers (NBC): Phil Stone (play–by–play) and Gene Washington (color commentator)

Team	Category	Player	Statistics
DEN	Passing		
DEN	Rushing		
DEN	Receiving		
SEA	Passing		
SEA	Rushing		
SEA	Receiving		

Scoring summary

Quarter	Time	Drive			Team	Scoring information	Score	
Quarter	Time	Plays	Yards	TOP	Team	Scoring information	DEN	SEA
1					Seahawks	22-yard field goal by Johnson	0	3
1					Broncos	Brown tackled in end zone for a safety by Boyd	2	3
3					Broncos	Herrmann 6-yard touchdown run, Karlis kick good	9	3
4					Seahawks	34-yard field goal by Johnson	9	6
4					Broncos	Krieg tackled in end zone for a safety by Chavous	11	6
4					Seahawks	Carr 19-yard touchdown reception from Krieg, Johnson kick good	11	13
"TOP" = time of possession. For other American football terms, see Glossary of American football.							11	13

- Point spread:
- Over/under:
- Time of game:

Broncos	Game statistics	Seahawks
	First downs	
	Rushes–yards	
	Passing yards	
	Passes	
	Sacked–yards	
	Net passing yards	
	Total yards	
	Return yards	
	Punts	
	Fumbles–lost	
	Penalties–yards	
	Time of possession	

Individual stats

== Standings ==
AFC West
	W	L	T	PCT	DIV	CONF	PF	PA	STK
Los Angeles Raiders^{(1)}	8	1	0	.889	5–0	5–1	260	200	W5
San Diego Chargers^{(5)}	6	3	0	.667	2–3	5–3	288	221	L1
Seattle Seahawks	4	5	0	.444	2–1	3–5	127	147	W1
Kansas City Chiefs	3	6	0	.333	2–1	3–3	176	184	W1
Denver Broncos	2	7	0	.222	0–6	0–6	148	226	L3

AFC
#	Team	W	L	T	PCT	PF	PA	STK
Seeded postseason qualifiers
1	Los Angeles Raiders	8	1	0	.889	260	200	W5
2 (Note: Miami finished ahead of Cincinnati based on better conference record (6–1 to Cincinnati’s 6–2).)	Miami Dolphins	7	2	0	.778	198	131	W3
3	Cincinnati Bengals	7	2	0	.778	232	177	W2
4 (Note: Pittsburgh finished ahead of San Diego based on better record against common opponents (3–1 to Chargers' 2–1). Conference tiebreak was initially used to eliminate New York Jets.) (Note: Pittsburgh and San Diego finished ahead of New York Jets based on conference record (Pittsburgh and San Diego 5–3 against Jets’ 2–3))	Pittsburgh Steelers	6	3	0	.667	204	146	W2
5	San Diego Chargers	6	3	0	.667	288	221	L1
6	New York Jets	6	3	0	.667	245	166	L1
7	New England Patriots	5	4	0	.556	143	157	W1
8 (Note: Cleveland finished ahead of Buffalo and Buffalo ahead of Seattle based on conference record (4–3 to Buffalo’s 3–3 to Seattle’s 3–5).)	Cleveland Browns	4	5	0	.444	140	182	L1
Did not qualify for the postseason
9	Buffalo Bills	4	5	0	.444	150	154	L3
10	Seattle Seahawks	4	5	0	.444	127	147	W1
11	Kansas City Chiefs	3	6	0	.333	176	184	W1
12	Denver Broncos	2	7	0	.222	148	226	L3
13	Houston Oilers	1	8	0	.111	136	245	L7
14	Baltimore Colts	0	8	1	.056	113	236	L2
Tiebreakers
