= Super Bowl XXI =

1987 National Football League championship game

Denver Broncos (2) (AFC) (11–5)	New York Giants (1) (NFC) (14–2)
20	39
Head coach: Dan Reeves	Head coach: Bill Parcells
	1	2	3	4	Total
DEN	10	0	0	10	20
NYG	7	2	17	13	39
- Date: January 25, 1987
- Kickoff time: 3:13 p.m. PST (UTC-8)
- Stadium: Rose Bowl; Pasadena, California
- MVP: Phil Simms, quarterback
- Favorite: Giants by 9.5
- Referee: Jerry Markbreit
- Attendance: 101,063

Ceremonies
- National anthem: Neil Diamond
- Coin toss: Willie Davis
- Halftime show: George Burns, Mickey Rooney, USC Marching Band

TV in the United States
- Network: CBS
- Announcers: Pat Summerall and John Madden
- Nielsen ratings: 45.8 (est. 87.2 million viewers)
- Market share: 66
- Cost of 30-second commercial: $600,000

Radio in the United States
- Network: NBC Radio
- Announcers: Don Criqui and Bob Trumpy

Super Bowl XXI was an American football game between the American Football Conference (AFC) champion Denver Broncos and the National Football Conference (NFC) champion New York Giants to decide the National Football League (NFL) champion for the 1986 season. It was the 21st Super Bowl and was played on January 25, 1987, at the Rose Bowl in Pasadena, California. The Giants defeated the Broncos, 39–20, for their first Super Bowl and first NFL title since 1956. It was the first of consecutive Super Bowl losses for the Broncos, who lost the Super Bowl a year later 42–10 to the Washington Redskins.

This was the Broncos' first Super Bowl appearance since the 1977 season. Led largely through the play of quarterback John Elway and a defense that led the AFC in fewest yards allowed, the Broncos posted an 11–5 regular season record and two narrow playoff victories. The Giants, led by quarterback Phil Simms, running back Joe Morris, and their "Big Blue Wrecking Crew" defense, advanced to their first Super Bowl after posting a 14–2 regular season record and only allowing a combined total of 3 points in their two postseason wins.

The game was tight in the first half, with the Broncos holding a 10–9 halftime lead, the narrowest margin in Super Bowl history. The only score in the second quarter, however, was Giants defensive end George Martin's sack of Elway in the end zone for a safety. This began the Giants’ run of scoring 26 unanswered points through the third and fourth quarters. Denver would counter with ten additional points toward the end of the game to narrow their margin of victory. The Giants also posted a Super Bowl record 30 points in the second half, and limited the Broncos to only 2 net yards in the third quarter. Simms, who was named the Super Bowl MVP, finished the game with 22 of 25 passes completed for 268 yards and three touchdowns. He also had 25 rushing yards on 3 carries. His 22 out of 25 (88%) completion percentage broke both a Super Bowl and NFL postseason record.

The telecast of the game on CBS was seen by an estimated 87.2 million viewers. The large national audience saw an early appearance of the now-traditional Gatorade shower, where players dump a cooler full of liquid over a coach's head following a meaningful win. The practice was first started by Giants players in 1985; it began to gain national attention during the 1986 season, when Parcells was doused after every win. Another tradition was set with the quarterback from the winning team stating after the game that he was "Going to Disneyworld/Disneyland!"; although this version was made into an advertisement (featuring "When You Wish Upon A Star" as its soundtrack) for later playback. Simms would be the first to say it live following the Giants win in Super Bowl XXV. Both he and Elway were each paid $75,000.

This loss also kicked off the Broncos' run of Super Bowl futility with John Elway under center that decade. They would make it back to the Super Bowl the next year but lost 42–10 to the Washington Redskins, after leading 10–0 at the end of the first quarter. Two years later, they made it back but fell to the defending world champion 49ers 55–10.

== Background ==
=== Host selection process ===
NFL owners voted to award Super Bowl XXI to Pasadena, California, on May 24, 1984, during their May 23–25, 1984 meetings in Washington, D.C. Fourteen cities were part of the bidding process, which was scheduled to award four Super Bowls (XXI, XXII, XXIII, and XXIV). The bidding cities included: Anaheim, Detroit, Houston, Jacksonville, Miami, Minneapolis, New Orleans, Pasadena, Philadelphia, San Francisco, San Diego, Seattle, Tampa, and Tempe. The Philadelphia host committee assembled what was considered a strong, but long-shot bid, hoping to win the first outdoor Super Bowl in a cold weather city. Minneapolis went above and beyond in selling their unsuccessful bid, even staging a parade in the lobby of the hotel hosting the NFL owners' meeting that included a woman riding a white horse. To counter, Philadelphia Eagles-owner Leonard Tose launched a parade in the style of the Mummers Parade, featuring musicians and clowns. Philadelphia ultimately came close to landing a Super Bowl at Veterans Stadium, nearly approaching the needed number of votes to secure the game. The city's momentum was disrupted after the NFL owners passed a resolution calling for a future Super Bowl to be held in a Northern city with a domed stadium, affirming the league's interest in another cold weather city hosting the game, while undermining Philadelphia's ongoing effort to have the dome-less Veterans Stadium host a Super bowl.

The balloting for XXI took 13 ballots and over two hours to complete, with Pasadena finally receiving the winning bid. XXII was also voted on, but the voting for XXIII and XXIV was postponed. This was the fourth time that Pasadena hosted the game, and the sixth time it was held in the Greater Los Angeles Area.

=== Denver Broncos ===
The Broncos won the AFC West with an 11–5 regular season record, largely through the play of quarterback John Elway. In just his fourth season in the league, Elway made an impact to the team with his ad-libbing skills. During the regular season, he had thrown for 3,480 yards and 19 touchdowns, while also rushing for 257 yards, the third-leading rusher on the team.

Elway did not really have a particular receiver who caught most of his passes during the regular season, but wide receivers Mark Jackson, Vance Johnson, Steve Watson, and tight end Orson Mobley all combined for 136 receptions and 2,132 yards. Pro Bowl running back Sammy Winder was the Broncos' top rusher with 789 yards and 9 touchdowns, while also catching 26 passes for another 171 yards and 5 touchdowns. Halfback Gerald Willhite rushed for 365 yards and 5 touchdowns, while also leading the team in receptions with 64 (for 529 yards and three touchdowns), and ranking third in the NFL in both punt return yards (468) and yards per return average (11.1). The Broncos also had a powerful offensive line, led by Pro Bowl guard Keith Bishop.

The Broncos' defense led the AFC in fewest rushing yards allowed (1,651). The defensive line was anchored by Pro Bowl defensive end Rulon Jones, who recorded 13.5 sacks and a fumble recovery. Denver's linebacking corps, led by three-time Pro Bowler Tom Jackson and Karl Mecklenburg, who recorded 9.5 sacks, was viewed as comparable to the Giants' Pro Bowl linebackers. Their secondary was led by Pro Bowl cornerbacks Dennis Smith and Louis Wright, along with Mike Harden, who intercepted 6 passes and returned them for 179 yards and 2 touchdowns. Wright, Steve Foley, and Jackson, the last remnants of Denver's Orange Crush defense of the 1970s, all retired after this Super Bowl.

=== New York Giants ===
The Giants advanced to their first Super Bowl in team history, and were playing for their first league championship since they lost to the Chicago Bears in the 1963 NFL Championship Game. The Giants were led by quarterback Phil Simms, who threw for 3,487 yards and 21 touchdowns (but also 22 interceptions). Simms' main target was tight end Mark Bavaro, who caught 66 passes for 1,001 yards and 4 touchdowns. Although the Giants did not have one great wide receiver, they did have several good ones. Receivers Stacy Robinson, Bobby Johnson, and Phil McConkey combined for 76 receptions and 1,307 yards.

However, running the ball was the Giants' primary offensive attack. Running back Joe Morris finished the regular season with a then-franchise record 1,516 rushing yards and 14 touchdowns, while also catching 21 passes for 223 yards and another touchdown. One reason for his success was fullback Maurice Carthon, who provided Morris with excellent blocking and was the team's second leading rusher with 260 yards. Another reason was the play of their offensive line, led by Pro Bowl left tackle Brad Benson and right tackle Karl Nelson. On special teams, punter Sean Landeta made the Pro Bowl with an average of 44.8 gross yards per punt (2nd in the NFL), a net average of 37.1, and 24 punts inside the 20.

The Giants main strength was their defense, nicknamed The "Big Blue Wrecking Crew". After giving up 31 points in a season-opening loss to the Dallas Cowboys, the Giants had not given up more than 20 points in a game until the last game of the season, in a 55–24 win over the Green Bay Packers. The team ranked second in the NFL in fewest points (236) and yards (4,757) allowed. The Giants' defensive leader was Hall of Fame outside linebacker Lawrence Taylor, who led the league with 20.5 sacks during the regular season, won the NFL Defensive Player of the Year Award for the third time in his career, and became just the second defensive player to win the NFL Most Valuable Player Award (Alan Page was the first in 1971). At 6'3" and 245 pounds, Taylor was big enough to break through the offensive lines of many teams, but he still had enough speed to chase down running backs. The Giants' other starting linebackers, Gary Reasons, Carl Banks, and future Hall of Famer Harry Carson, did not get as much media attention as Taylor, but Carson had been selected to play in the Pro Bowl, while Reasons had two interceptions and Banks recorded 6.5 sacks and 2 fumble recoveries. Nose tackle Jim Burt and right end Leonard Marshall, who were also both selected to the Pro Bowl, anchored the defensive line. Marshall recorded 12 sacks, 3 fumble recoveries, and 1 interception during the season. The Giants secondary was led by safeties Terry Kinard (4 interceptions, 2 fumble recoveries) and Kenny Hill (3 interceptions, 3 fumble recoveries), along with cornerback Perry Williams (4 interceptions).

With the play of their defense, the running attack led by Morris, and Simms' passing game, the Giants earned a 14–2 regular season record.

This is the only one of the New York Giants’ five Super Bowl appearances where they were favored.

=== Playoffs ===
Elway's ability to improvise on the fly, in part, helped Denver to make it through the playoffs, narrowly defeating the New England Patriots 22–17, and the Cleveland Browns 23–20, in the AFC Championship Game. The AFC Championship Game against the Browns was particularly significant because Elway displayed why many NFL experts thought Super Bowl XXI would be the first of many Super Bowls for him. In what became known as The Drive, the Broncos started from their own 2-yard line, trailing 20–13, with 5:32 left to play. But in 15 plays, Elway led Denver 98 yards for a game-tying touchdown pass with 39 seconds left. The Broncos then won in overtime after Elway led them 60 yards in 9 plays to set up kicker Rich Karlis' game-winning field goal.

Meanwhile, the Giants went on to only allow a combined total of 3 points in their playoff victories over the San Francisco 49ers, 49–3, and the Washington Redskins, 17–0, respectively. The dominating performances by the Giants' defense gave the team extra confidence going into their Super Bowl matchup versus the Broncos.

=== Super Bowl pregame news ===
Much of the pregame hype centered around the confrontation between Elway and Taylor, and whether or not Taylor would be able to hurry Elway's throws or sack him. The Giants had narrowly defeated Denver during the regular season, forcing four turnovers in a 19–16 win despite being outgained in total yards 405 to 262. This was the last Super Bowl until Super Bowl XXXIV in which both teams entered the game having never won a Super Bowl before.

As the designated home team in the annual rotation between AFC and NFC teams, the Giants wore their home blue uniforms and white pants. The Broncos donned their all-white road uniforms.

The New York players in this game wore stickers with the number 38 on their helmets as a tribute to former Giants fullback John Tuggle, who had died of cancer shortly before the start of the season at age 25. They also had patches on their uniforms as a memorial to former Giants defensive back Carl Lockhart, who had died of lymphoma at the age of 43 one month before Tuggle.

== Broadcasting ==
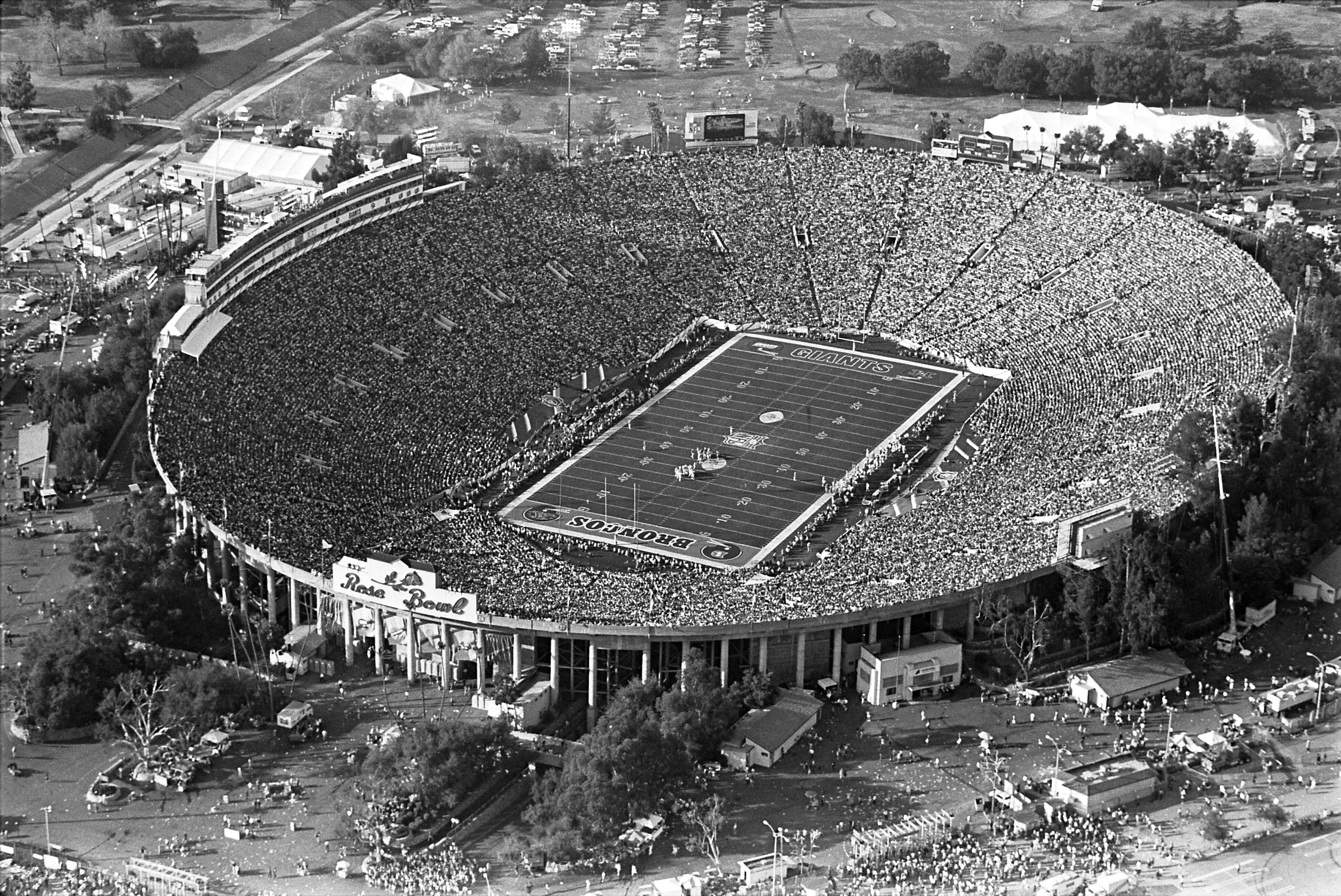
Aerial view of the game at the Rose Bowl

The game was broadcast in the United States by CBS. It featured the broadcast team of play-by-play announcer Pat Summerall and color commentator John Madden. Brent Musburger of The NFL Today anchored The Super Bowl Today pregame, halftime and postgame coverage. Helping Musburger were reporters Irv Cross and Will McDonough and analysts Jimmy "The Greek" Snyder (his last Super Bowl; as Snyder was fired before the following season's NFC Championship Game following a controversy over remarks suggesting African-Americans were better athletes because they were bred that way during slavery), Terry Bradshaw, Joe Theismann, Mariette Hartley from the recently-launched The Morning Program morning show (looking at the relationship between football and Hollywood), CBS News reporter Charles Osgood, Ben Wright (Wright, normally part of CBS golf coverage, was reporting from Milan, Italy and was reporting on international interest in the Super Bowl), Anne Butler, Pat O'Brien (reporting from a mine in Summit County, Colorado) and Dan Dierdorf (in his final CBS assignment before moving on to ABC's Monday Night Football for the following season; Dierdorf would return to CBS for the 1999 season); with additional features including home video footage recorded by backup Giants running back Tony Galbreath and Broncos guard Keith Bishop; an interview of both Bill Parcells and Indiana Hoosiers men's basketball) head coach Bob Knight (Parcells having been an assistant coach to Knight on the Army Black Knights men's basketball team during the 1966–67 season) and an opportunity to call one of three 900 numbers to determine whether one agree with Snyder’s prediction of a 24–20 Giant victory, felt the Giants would win by a larger margin or that the Broncos would win.

This was the first NFL game to be broadcast in Dolby Surround sound and in stereo.

Nationally on radio, the game was carried over the NBC Radio Network. Don Criqui served as play-by-play with Bob Trumpy his color commentator. This was the last Super Bowl called by Criqui, as NBC Radio lost NFL rights following the season and he returned to his secondary play-by-play role on NBC television. Trumpy would call two more Super Bowls for NBC television (Super Bowl XXVII and Super Bowl XXVIII) as part of the network's No. 1 broadcast team. In the teams' local markets, the game was carried on WNEW-AM in New York City with Jim Gordon and Dick Lynch and KOA-AM in Denver, Colorado (and much of the western and central United States thanks to KOA's 50,000-watt clear channel signal), with Bob Martin and Larry Zimmer.

The game was also broadcast in Canada on CTV and in the United Kingdom on Channel 4. The latter had commentary by Frank Gifford, John Smith and Don Shula. This was also the first Super Bowl to be telecast on commercial television in Asia, as the GMA Network in the Philippines aired its first Super Bowl. This game also marked the first Super Bowl to be broadcast live in Rome.

Super Bowl XXI is featured in NFL's Greatest Games under the title Land of the Giants and was narrated by John Doremus.

=== Music ===
The game is notable for the two intended debuts of musical themes that have become syonymous with the network, for differing reasons. CBS opened the game with the theme music, composed by Lloyd Landesman, that would later be used for their college football coverage.

CBS also originally planned to debut the song "One Shining Moment" during a postgame montage at the end of its coverage. Songwriter David Barrett had originally wrote "One Shining Moment" for basketball, being inspired after watching Larry Bird play. For the Super Bowl XXI montage, the lyrics were modified to make football references instead of basketball ones, such as changing "The ball is tipped" to "The ball is kicked". However, both the game and the postgame interviews ran past the expected airtime, and thus the montage was canceled and CBS instead went straight to its Super Bowl lead-out program, Hard Copy. CBS then asked Barrett for permission to use the song after the 1987 NCAA Division I men's basketball championship game on March 30, in which Indiana beat Syracuse. "One Shining Moment" was used to close CBS's coverage of the tournament. The positive public response led to it becoming an annual feature on the NCAA Division I men's basketball tournament coverage ever since.

== Entertainment ==
The pregame show was a salute to California and featured the pop music group The Beach Boys and Canadian jazz fusion band The Shuffle Demons. Singer Neil Diamond performed the national anthem. The show was directed and choreographed by Lesslee Fitzmorris. The coin toss ceremony featured Pro Football Hall of Fame defensive lineman Willie Davis.

The halftime show was a "Salute to Hollywood's 100th Anniversary" featuring an introduction by George Burns (who was only nine years younger than the Hollywood neighborhood in Los Angeles) and a performance by the Southern California high school drill teams and dancers.

Upon winning, Giants players celebrated by dumping a Gatorade cooler on head coach Bill Parcells; the 1986 Giants are credited with starting this tradition following a game earlier in the season.

Super Bowl XXI MVP Phil Simms became the first athlete to appear in an "I'm going to Disney World!" television ad, being recorded shouting the phrase while celebrating the team's victory immediately after the game.

== Game summary ==
=== First quarter ===
On the Broncos' first play after receiving the opening kickoff, quarterback John Elway faked a handoff, then spun around and ran in the opposite direction for a 10-yard gain to the Denver 34-yard line. Then on third down, his 24-yard completion to wide receiver Mark Jackson advanced the ball to the Giants' 39-yard line. However, the Giants' defense tightened up and halted the drive at the 30-yard line, forcing Denver to settle for kicker Rich Karlis's 48-yard field goal to give them an early 3–0 lead. Karlis' kick tied a Super Bowl record for longest field goal set by Jan Stenerud of the Kansas City Chiefs in Super Bowl IV.

New York responded on their first possession of the game with a 9-play, 78-yard drive. First, quarterback Phil Simms completed a 17-yard pass to wide receiver Lionel Manuel. Then running back Joe Morris ran for 11 yards to the Denver 41-yard line. Despite a holding penalty on New York tight end Mark Bavaro, the Giants marched to the Broncos 6 with Simms' 18-yard pass to wide receiver Stacy Robinson, and then a 17-yard completion to Bavaro two plays later. Simms finished the drive with a 6-yard touchdown pass to tight end Zeke Mowatt, giving the Giants a 7–3 lead.

Broncos kick returner Ken Bell gave his team great field position by returning the ensuing kickoff 28 yards to the Broncos 42-yard line. Elway's first two passes were a 14-yard completion to running back Sammy Winder, followed by an 11-yard completion to tight end Orson Mobley, moving the ball to the New York 33-yard line. On the next play Elway called a screen pass for Winder, which he ran for a gain of 9 yards before going out of bounds. Linebacker Harry Carson hit Winder after he stepped out, drawing a penalty for unnecessary roughness. Then an unsportsmanlike conduct penalty was assessed to linebacker Lawrence Taylor for picking up and throwing the first flag.

Carson's penalty was assessed for 12 yards, half the distance to the goal from the spot of the dead ball, and Taylor's was for half the distance from that spot, resulting in a total of 19 penalty yards and a first down for Denver at the New York 6-yard line. The Giants kept the Broncos out of the end zone for the first two plays, but on third down, Elway scored on a 4-yard quarterback draw to regain the lead for the Broncos, 10–7, with just over two minutes remaining in the first quarter.

=== Second quarter ===
After Denver forced a punt by New York to start the second quarter, Elway dropped back to pass from his own 18-yard line on 3rd-and-12. The Giants' pass rush forced him to scramble out of the pocket, but it gave him enough time to find wide receiver Vance Johnson for a 54-yard completion. Elway then moved the Broncos down the field further and after a third down completion to running back Steve Sewell, the third time Denver converted on the drive (Elway found Mobley for a second first down after the Johnson play), they had the ball on the New York 1-yard line with a chance to take a two-score lead.

However, the Giants' defense stood their ground. First, Elway tried a run-pass option, but Taylor broke through the line and tackled him for a 1-yard loss. Carson stopped fullback Gerald Willhite on the next play for no gain on a run up the middle, and linebacker Carl Banks chased down Winder as he attempted to score on a sweep, tackling him for a 4-yard loss, bringing up 4th-and-goal from the 5. Karlis tried to salvage the drive with a 24-yard field goal, but he missed it wide right, giving him the record for the shortest missed field goal in Super Bowl history.

The Giants picked up a first down on the first play of the ensuing drive as Bavaro caught a 12-yard pass from Simms on the first play from scrimmage. Simms followed that up with an 8-yard completion to Robinson, and two plays later, Morris picked up a first down with a short run. The drive stalled there, and the Broncos got the ball back on their 15. Elway was tackled for a 2-yard loss by defensive end Leonard Marshall on the first play of the ensuing drive.

What followed was one of the more controversial calls of the game. With the ball on his own 13-yard line, Elway found tight end Clarence Kay for a gain of 25 yards and an apparent first down. However, referee Jerry Markbreit conferred with his crew and reversed the call, determining that Kay had not controlled the ball before being tackled. However, the discussion among the crew continued for some time before NFL Director of Officiating Art McNally paged umpire Bob Boylston; this meant that, for the first time, the newly introduced instant replay system would be used in a Super Bowl.

The crew then waited while McNally and the officials in the replay booth took a second look at the play. They determined that the play should stand as called, since they were not able to find conclusive evidence that the pass was complete. However, CBS discovered that the referees had erred in their judgment; toward the end of the first half, the network showed the Kay play from the reverse angle view, which the replay booth did not have access to, and it clearly showed that the pass was caught cleanly.

To make things less ideal for the Broncos, the Giants' pass rush got to Elway again on third down and forced him into the end zone. George Martin, the veteran New York defensive lineman, tackled him there for a safety, cutting the Denver lead to 10-9 and giving the ball back to the offense with a chance to regain the lead. However, after Simms failed to complete a third down pass to Bavaro on third down (which, incidentally, would his last incompletion of the game), the Broncos were able to get the ball back.

With 1:09 left in the half, the Broncos started from their own 37-yard line. On second down, Elway completed a 31-yard pass to wide receiver Steve Watson, and then a 10-yard pass to Willhite, giving the Broncos a first down at the Giants 21. They moved the ball to the 16, which resulted from a penalty on nose tackle Jim Burt for jumping offsides, but the Giants forced two incompletions. The last of these saw Elway lead Mobley too far on a throw to the end zone and cause him to collide with the goal post.

Despite having missed a relative chip shot field goal on his last attempt, Karlis was called upon again to try to extend the Denver lead, this time with a 34-yarder. Despite having made all but one of his attempts inside of 40 yards during the regular season, Karlis once again pulled the kick wide right and the drive ended with no points. Karlis later admitted his two misses in the first half were devastating to the Broncos: "Both times I didn't get my hips all the way through the kicks. I was steering the ball, and I know better than that. I felt the team unravel after that. I really hurt them."

=== Third quarter ===
In the second half, the Giants dominated the Broncos, outscoring them 30–10 with four touchdowns and a field goal on their first five possessions.

The Giants took the opening kickoff in the third quarter, but faced 4th-and-1 after their first three plays. New York sent their punt formation out onto the field. Parcells had entertained the possibility of running a fake punt and sent backup quarterback Jeff Rutledge onto the field to line up as a third blocking back along with running backs Maurice Carthon and Lee Rouson. Parcells said his reasoning was that if the Broncos were not going to pick up on Rutledge being used as a decoy for a potential fake, he would take advantage. As he had thought, Denver paid no attention to Rutledge, and he moved under center while punter Sean Landeta split out as a receiver and Carthon and Rouson lined up in a split back set behind him. Rutledge then took the snap from center and ran a quarterback sneak to the New York 47-yard line for a first down. On the next play, Simms completed a 13-yard pass to Morris, and then followed it up with a 23-yard completion to Rouson. Three plays later, Simms finished the drive with a 13-yard touchdown pass to Bavaro to give the Giants a 16–10 lead. The Broncos were forced to punt on their next drive, and wide receiver Phil McConkey returned the punt 25 yards to Denver's 36-yard line. The Broncos managed to keep the Giants out of the end zone, but kicker Raúl Allegre increased New York's lead to 19–10 with a 21-yard field goal.

Denver was again forced to punt on their ensuing possession. Afterwards, Simms completed a 17-yard pass to Manuel at the Broncos 45-yard line. Two plays later, the Giants executed a flea flicker play for a 44-yard gain. Simms handed off to Morris, but before he crossed the line of scrimmage, Morris pitched the ball back to Simms. With the ensuing pass, Simms found McConkey, who was wide open at the Broncos 20-yard line. After eluding safety Steve Foley, McConkey was upended by cornerback Mark Haynes just before he reached the goal line, throwing his hands up in mock frustration after being stopped at the 1-yard line. On the next play, Morris scored on a 1-yard touchdown run, increasing the Giants' lead to 26–10 and essentially putting the game away.

=== Fourth quarter ===
Elway barely avoided a turnover by recovering his own fumble on the last play of the third quarter before getting sacked for an 11-yard loss by Marshall. After a false start by offensive tackle Ken Lanier pushed Denver back to their own 4-yard line to start the fourth quarter, Elway threw an interception to Giants cornerback Elvis Patterson, who was tackled at the Denver 42 by Watson, but an illegal use of hands penalty on Patterson after the interception moved the ball to the New York 48. On the second play after the turnover, Simms completed a 36-yard pass to Robinson. Four plays later, from the Broncos 6, Simms threw a pass to Bavaro in the end zone. The pass bounced off Bavaro's fingertips, but fell right into the hands of McConkey for a touchdown, extending the Giants' lead to 33–10.

The Broncos, now playing for pride, finally managed to get a good drive going on their next possession, advancing the ball 74 yards in 13 plays. Elway completed 5 of 6 passes for 46 yards (including a 15-yard reception by Jackson) and rushed for 14, while Karlis finished the drive with a 28-yard field goal, cutting Denver's deficit to 33–13. But Giants wide receiver Bobby Johnson recovered Karlis' ensuing onside kick attempt and New York responded with yet another scoring drive. Rouson ran twice for 21 yards, and then Simms ran for a 22-yard gain. On the next play, running back Ottis Anderson scored on a 2-yard touchdown run, giving the Giants a 39–13 lead after Allegre missed the extra point wide left.

Denver finally scored their second touchdown of the game when Elway found Vance Johnson on a 47-yard bomb later on, which was the 100th recorded Super Bowl touchdown. Elway would eventually be replaced by Gary Kubiak, who took a sack to end the game, and the Giants were victorious in a 39–20 rout of the Broncos.

As the final seconds of the game ticked away, Carson, continuing the recent trend started by the Giants, gave Parcells a Gatorade shower, going as far as to take off his jersey and pads and sneak behind Parcells with a Rose Bowl security team shirt on. Thanks in large part to this particular Gatorade dunking, a tradition of sorts was formed that continues to this day. In addition, offensive tackle Brad Benson and center Bart Oates drenched Simms with a cooler of ice water. "I think it was very appropriate to cool the guy down", Oates explained, "as hot as he was in the game."

Simms finished with a passer rating of 150.92, the highest for one game in Super Bowl history. Morris was the top rusher of the game, gaining 67 yards, and added another 20 yards on 4 receptions. Robinson was the Giants' top receiver with 3 catches for 62 yards. Bavaro caught 4 passes for 51 yards and a touchdown. McConkey caught 2 passes for 50 yards and a touchdown, returned a punt for 25 yards, and even got to make a contribution after the game, discovering a dropped police pistol on the field and turning it over to a stadium security guard. Defensively, while the Broncos managed to bottle up Lawrence Taylor, Carl Banks had 14 tackles, 10 of which were unassisted and four of those for negative yardage, while Leonard Marshall had two sacks and forced a fumble. Elway finished the game with 22 out of 37 pass completions for 304 yards, 1 touchdown, and 1 interception. He also was the Broncos' leading rusher in the game, with 27 rushing yards and a touchdown on 6 carries. Denver's Vance Johnson was the top receiver of the game, with 5 receptions for 121 yards, an average of 24.2 yards per catch, and a touchdown.

The Giants' victory in Super Bowl XXI marked the second time in four months that the New York metropolitan area had won a championship in a major professional sport; three months before, the New York Mets had won the 1986 World Series.

=== Box score ===
Super Bowl XXI: New York Giants 39, Denver Broncos 20

Quarter	1	2	3	4	Total
Broncos (AFC)	10	0	0	10	20
Giants (NFC)	7	2	17	13	39

at Rose Bowl, Pasadena, California

- Date: January 25, 1987
- Game time: 3:13 p.m. PST
- Game weather: 76 °F (24 °C), sunny

Scoring summary

Quarter	Time	Drive			Team	Scoring information	Score	
Quarter	Time	Plays	Yards	TOP	Team	Scoring information	DEN	NYG
1	10:51	8	45	4:09	DEN	48-yard field goal by Rich Karlis	3	0
1	5:27	9	78	5:24	NYG	Zeke Mowatt 6-yard touchdown reception from Phil Simms, Raúl Allegre kick good	3	7
1	2:06	6	58	3:21	DEN	John Elway 4-yard touchdown run, Karlis kick good	10	7
2	2:46	3	–15	0:47	NYG	Elway tackled in end zone for a safety by George Martin	10	9
3	10:08	8	63	4:52	NYG	Mark Bavaro 13-yard touchdown reception from Simms, Allegre kick good	10	16
3	3:54	9	32	5:07	NYG	21-yard field goal by Allegre	10	19
3	0:24	5	68	2:14	NYG	Joe Morris 1-yard touchdown run, Allegre kick good	10	26
4	10:56	6	52	3:50	NYG	Phil McConkey 6-yard touchdown reception from Simms, Allegre kick good	10	33
4	6:01	13	73	4:55	DEN	28-yard field goal by Karlis	13	33
4	4:18	5	46	2:43	NYG	Ottis Anderson 2-yard touchdown run, Allegre kick no good (wide left)	13	39
4	2:06	5	69	2:12	DEN	Vance Johnson 47-yard touchdown reception from Elway, Karlis kick good	20	39
"TOP" = time of possession. For other American football terms, see Glossary of American football.							20	39

== Final statistics ==
Sources: NFL.com Super Bowl XXI, Super Bowl XXI Play Finder NYG, Super Bowl XXI Play Finder Den

=== Statistical comparison ===
	Denver Broncos	New York Giants
First downs	23	24
First downs rushing	5	10
First downs passing	16	13
First downs penalty	2	1
Third down efficiency	7/14	6/12
Fourth down efficiency	0/0	1/2
Net yards rushing	52	136
Rushing attempts	19	38
Yards per rush	2.7	3.6
Passing – Completions/attempts	26/41	22/25
Times sacked-total yards	4–32	1–5
Interceptions thrown	1	0
Net yards passing	320	263
Total net yards	372	399
Punt returns-total yards	1–9	1–25
Kickoff returns-total yards	5–84	4–53
Interceptions-total return yards	0–0	1–(−7)
Punts-average yardage	2–41.0	3–46.0
Fumbles-lost	2–0	0–0
Penalties-total yards	4–28	6–48
Time of possession	25:21	34:39
Turnovers	1	0

=== Individual statistics ===
Broncos passing
	C/ATT^{1}	Yds	TD	INT	Rating
John Elway	22/37	304	1	1	83.6
Gary Kubiak	4/4	48	0	0	116.7
Broncos rushing
	Car^{2}	Yds	TD	LG^{3}	Yds/Car
John Elway	6	27	1	10	4.50
Gerald Willhite	4	19	0	11	4.75
Steve Sewell	3	4	0	12	1.33
Gene Lang	2	2	0	4	1.00
Sammy Winder	4	0	0	3	0.00
Broncos receiving
	Rec^{4}	Yds	TD	LG^{3}	Target^{5}
Vance Johnson	5	121	1	54	6
Gerald Willhite	5	39	0	11	10
Sammy Winder	4	34	0	14	4
Mark Jackson	3	51	0	24	4
Steve Watson	2	54	0	31	3
Clint Sampson	2	20	0	11	2
Orson Mobley	2	17	0	11	5
Steve Sewell	2	12	0	7	4
Gene Lang	1	4	0	4	1
Clarence Kay	0	0	0	0	2

Giants passing
	C/ATT^{1}	Yds	TD	INT	Rating
Phil Simms	22/25	268	3	0	150.9
Giants rushing
	Car^{2}	Yds	TD	LG^{3}	Yds/Car
Joe Morris	20	67	1	11	3.35
Phil Simms	3	25	0	22	8.33
Lee Rouson	3	22	0	18	7.33
Tony Galbreath	4	17	0	7	4.25
Maurice Carthon	3	4	0	2	1.33
Ottis Anderson	2	1	1	2	0.50
Jeff Rutledge	3	0	0	2	0.00
Giants receiving
	Rec^{4}	Yds	TD	LG^{3}	Target^{5}
Mark Bavaro	4	51	1	17	5
Joe Morris	4	20	0	12	4
Maurice Carthon	4	13	0	7	4
Stacy Robinson	3	62	0	36	4
Lionel Manuel	3	43	0	17	3
Phil McConkey	2	50	1	44	3
Lee Rouson	1	23	0	23	1
Zeke Mowatt	1	6	1	6	1

^{1}Completions/attempts ^{2}Carries ^{3}Long gain ^{4}Receptions ^{5}Times targeted

=== Records set ===
The following records were set in Super Bowl XXI, according to the official NFL.com boxscore, the 2016 NFL Record & Fact Book and the Pro-Football-Reference.com game summary.
Some records have to meet NFL minimum number of attempts to be recognized. The minimums are shown (in parentheses).

Player records set
Passing records
Highest passer rating, game	150.9	Phil Simms (New York)
Highest completion percentage, game, (20 attempts)	88.0% (22–25)	Phil Simms (New York)
Most consecutive completions, game	10	Phil Simms (New York)
Records tied
Longest field goal	48 yards	Rich Karlis (Denver)
Most 40-plus yard field goals, game	1	Rich Karlis (Denver)
Most Safeties, Game	1	George Martin (New York)

Team records set
Points
Most points scored, second half	30 points	Giants
Passing
Highest completion percentage (20 attempts)	88.0% (22–25)	Giants
Defense
Most yards allowed in a win	372	Giants
Records tied
Most touchdowns, game	5	Giants
Most Safeties, Game	1	Giants
Fewest turnovers, game	0	Giants
Fewest punts, game	2	Broncos

Turnovers are defined as the number of times losing the ball on interceptions and fumbles.

Records set, both team totals
	Total	Giants	Broncos
Points, Both Teams
Most points scored, second half	40 points	30	10
Rushing, both teams
Fewest rushing yards (net)	155 yards	136	19
Turnovers, Both Teams
Fewest Turnovers	1	0	1
Punting, Both Teams
Fewest punts, game	5	3	2
Records tied, both team totals
Most points, first quarter	17 points	7	10
Fewest times intercepted	1	0	1
Fewest fumbles lost	0	0	0
Fewest punt returns, game	2	1	1

This is also the first, and only time in history, an NFL game ended with a final score of 39–20.

== Starting lineups ==
Hall of Fame‡

Denver	Position	Position	New York
Offense
Vance Johnson	WR		Lionel Manuel
Dave Studdard	LT		Brad Benson
Keith Bishop	LG		Billy Ard
Billy Bryan	C		Bart Oates
Mark Cooper	RG		Chris Godfrey
Ken Lanier	RT		Karl Nelson
Clarence Kay	TE		Mark Bavaro
Steve Watson	WR		Stacy Robinson
John Elway‡	QB		Phil Simms
Sammy Winder	RB		Joe Morris
Gerald Willhite	FB		Maurice Carthon
Defense
Andre Townsend	LE		George Martin
Greg Kragen	NT		Jim Burt
Rulon Jones	RE		Leonard Marshall
Jim Ryan	LOLB		Carl Banks
Karl Mecklenburg	LILB		Gary Reasons
Ricky Hunley	RILB		Harry Carson‡
Tom Jackson	ROLB		Lawrence Taylor‡
Louis Wright	LCB		Elvis Patterson
Mike Harden	RCB		Perry Williams
Steve Foley	SS		Kenny Hill
Dennis Smith	FS		Herb Welch

== Officials ==
- Referee: Jerry Markbreit #9-second Super Bowl (XVII)
- Umpire: Bob Boylston #101 first Super Bowl
- Head linesman: Terry Gierke No. 72 first Super Bowl
- Line judge: Bob Beeks #59 fourth Super Bowl (XIV, XVI, XVIII)
- Back judge: Jim Poole No. 92 first Super Bowl
- Side judge: Gil Mace #90 second Super Bowl (XVIII)
- Field judge: Pat Mallette #82 first Super Bowl
- Alternate umpire: Hendi Ancich #115 worked Super Bowl XXIV

== Trivia ==
This was the first scorigami in Super Bowl history. As of the start of the 2026-27 NFL season, Super Bowl XXI remains the only game in league history to have a 39-20 final score.

Coincidentally, the other two Super Bowl scorigami also involved the Broncos, and they have lost both games: Super Bowl XXIV (55-10), and Super Bowl XLVIII (43-8).
