= Poulus =

Poulus is a Dutch patronymic surname originating from the given name.

- Jan Poulus (1916–1991), Dutch footballer
- Hein Poulus, Dutch-Canadian attorney
