= Bruce Baldwin =

Bruce Baldwin may refer to:

- Bruce Baldwin (American football) (born 1959), American football player
- Bruce Baldwin (cricketer) (born 1950), New Zealand cricketer
