= Rick Parros =

American football player (born 1958)

No. 24, 29
- Position: Running back

Personal information
- Born: June 14, 1958 (age 68); Brooklyn, New York, U.S.
- Listed height: 5 ft 11 in (1.80 m)
- Listed weight: 200 lb (91 kg)

Career information
- High school: Granite (South Salt Lake, Utah)
- College: Utah State
- NFL draft: 1980: 4th round, 107th overall pick

Career history
- Denver Broncos (1981–1984); Seattle Seahawks (1985, 1987)

Career NFL statistics
- Rushing yards: 1,381
- Rushing average: 3.9
- Rushing touchdowns: 7
- Stats at Pro Football Reference

Rick U. Parros (born June 14, 1958) is an American former professional football player who was a running back in the National Football League (NFL). He played college football for the Utah State Aggies. Parros was selected by the Denver Broncos in the fourth round of the 1980 NFL draft, for whom he played from 1981 through 1984. He was Denver's leading rusher in 1981 with 749 yards on 176 carries.

Parros also played for the Seattle Seahawks in 1985 and 1987.

== NFL career statistics ==
Legend
**Bold**	Career high

Year	Team	Games		Rushing					Receiving				
Year	Team	GP	GS	Att	Yds	Avg	Lng	TD	Rec	Yds	Avg	Lng	TD
1981	DEN	**16**	**16**	**176**	**749**	4.3	**25**	**2**	25	216	8.6	26	1
1982	DEN	9	9	77	277	3.6	14	1	**37**	**259**	7.0	24	**2**
1983	DEN	6	5	30	96	3.2	13	1	12	126	10.5	**33**	**2**
1984	DEN	15	2	46	208	**4.5**	**25**	**2**	6	25	4.2	9	0
1985	SEA	4	0	8	19	2.4	6	0	1	27	**27.0**	27	0
1987	SEA	1	1	13	32	2.5	7	1	1	7	7.0	7	0
		51	33	350	1,381	3.9	25	7	82	660	8.0	33	5
