= Grady Alderman =

American football player (1938–2018)

No. 67
- Position: Offensive tackle

Personal information
- Born: December 10, 1938; Detroit, Michigan, U.S.
- Died: April 5, 2018 (aged 79); Evergreen, Colorado, U.S.
- Listed height: 6 ft 2 in (1.88 m)
- Listed weight: 247 lb (112 kg)

Career information
- High school: Madison (Madison Heights, Michigan)
- College: Detroit (1957–1959)
- NFL draft: 1960: 10th round, 111th overall pick
- Expansion draft: 1961: 1st round, 1st overall pick

Career history

Playing
- Detroit Lions (1960); Minnesota Vikings (1961–1974)

Operations
- Denver Broncos (1981–1982) General manager

Awards and highlights
- NFL champion (1969); 2× Second-team All-Pro (1965, 1969); 6× Pro Bowl (1963–1967, 1969); 50 Greatest Vikings; Minnesota Vikings 25th Anniversary Team

Career NFL statistics
- Games played: 204
- Games started: 177
- Fumble recoveries: 13
- Stats at Pro Football Reference
- Executive profile at Pro Football Reference

Grady Charles Alderman (December 10, 1938 – April 5, 2018) was an American professional football player and executive. He played principally as an offensive tackle for 15 seasons in the National Football League (NFL), mostly with the Minnesota Vikings. He was named to the Pro Bowl six times, and was the last player from the original Vikings expansion draft to play for the team.

== Early life ==
Alderman was born on December 10, 1938, in Detroit, Michigan to Cecil and Grace Alderman. He attended Madison High School in Madison Heights, Michigan, where he played high school football.

He attended the University of Detroit Mercy, playing on its football team from 1957 to 1959 as an offensive lineman. He received a Bachelor of Science degree in accounting. As a senior, he was one of two players named the team's most valuable linemen. He was second-team All-Catholic All-American in 1959. He was named a member of the Detroit Mercy Titans Hall of Fame.

== Football career ==
=== Playing career ===
The Detroit Lions selected Alderman in the tenth round of the 1960 NFL draft (111th overall). He played sparingly in 11 games for the Lions in 1960, starting only one (at guard). In 1961, the Minnesota Vikings selected him in the January 26, 1961 expansion draft. He started 14 games at left tackle in his initial season with the Vikings (1961). He served the first half of 1962 in the Army, at Fort Leonard Wood, Missouri, with teammate Tommy Mason. Alderman and Mason returned to the Vikings in July, in time for the 1962 season.

Alderman played in 193 regular season games for the Vikings, chiefly at left tackle. He started 176 games for the Vikings from 1961 to 1974. He was selected to six Pro Bowls in a seven-year span (1963–1967, 1969), and was twice named a second-team All-Pro (1965 and 1969). Alderman played in 12 post-season games for the Vikings, including Super Bowls IV, VIII and IX. He missed only three games in 14 years with the Vikings. He was the Vikings offensive team captain for eight seasons.

In 1974, he put off having cancer surgery to participate in Super Bowl VIII, played on January 13, 1974. He had learned about the cancer after the Vikings defeated the Dallas Cowboys for the National Football Conference title on December 30, 1973. His doctors concluded there was no additional risk to him if he played in the Super Bowl, and Alderman had the surgery three days after the Super Bowl; subsequently undergoing radiation treatment as well. Alderman lived another 44 years.

After being the Vikings’ offensive captain again in 1974, the team waived him in June 1975, and he was quickly claimed by the Chicago Bears. In 1975, he ended his professional playing career in the Chicago Bears training camp, as a player then coach, and did not play another official game.

=== Legacy ===
By 1969, he was the last player taken by the Vikings in the expansion draft who was still on the team, and became known as the "last of the original Vikings." The Vikings had selected future Hall of Fame quarterback Fran Tarkenton in the third round of the 1961 NFL draft, held on December 27-28, 1960. He played for the Vikings alongside Alderman from the team’s inception in 1961 to 1966; and then again years later from 1972 to 1978 (1972-74 with Alderman). Alderman was the first player Tarkenton met during the Vikings first training camp. Tarkenton was the Vikings starting quarterback until being traded after the 1966 season to the New York Giants. He was traded back to the Vikings before the 1972 season and finished his career in Minnesota.

Neither Tarkenton nor Alderman, however, played as long, or as late, for the Vikings as original Viking defensive end Jim Marshall. Marshall was obtained in a trade before the Vikings 1961 inaugural season, and played 19 consecutive seasons for the Vikings (1961-1979), starting every Vikings game during those 19 seasons. This made Marshall the last Viking who played for the inaugural 1961 team at the time he retired, Tarkenton the last original Viking taken in the NFL draft at the time he retired, and Alderman the last original Viking taken in the 1961 expansion draft at the time he retired.

Fran Tarkenton described Alderman and Marshall as the cornerstones of the Vikings teams of that era. Hall of Fame Minnesota coach Bud Grant said of Alderman, "'He was a great leader, respected, smart and played left tackle which is a very valuable position on the field and was good at it. He was very, very intelligent, and it showed in how he played.'"

He was selected to the group of 50 Greatest Vikings, named to celebrate the team’s 50th anniversary. He had also been named to the Vikings’ 25th Anniversary All-Time Team.

In 2021, the Professional Football Researchers Association named Alderman to the PFRA Hall of Very Good Class of 2021.

=== Post-playing professional football career ===
==== Broadcaster for Vikings ====
After leaving the Bears, for the next four years Alderman did color commentary for radio broadcasts of the Vikings' games. He worked alongside play-by-play announcer Joe McConnell on WCCO radio.

==== Business development with Vikings ====
Alderman then became the Director of Planning and Development for the Vikings. He used his financial experience to work with the Vikings in overseeing the construction of the team's headquarters (Winter Park); and then in managing a $25 million investment earmarked for construction of the Vikings new sports stadium (the Hubert H. Humphrey Metrodome).

==== General manager Denver Broncos ====
Alderman left his director position with the Vikings when the Denver Broncos hired him to replace general manager Fred Gehrke. Alderman was the Bronco's general manager from March 1981 until December 1982. He was replaced by Hein Polous, with the Broncos and Alderman agreeing that Alderman was not fired, and the move to hire Polous was mutually agreed upon.

== Personal life ==
Alderman was a Certified Public Accountant (CPA). During the off seasons of his playing career, he worked as a CPA for Deloitte, Haskins & Sells.

Alderman stayed in Colorado even after leaving his general manager position with the Broncos in 1982, and lived with his family in Evergreen, Colorado. There, he had a business as a CPA, worked in banking as an asset based lender, and worked as a contractor. He served on the foundation board for the Rockland Community Church.

== Death ==
Alderman died on April 5, 2018, at the age of 79 at the Life Care Center of Evergreen, Colorado. He was survived by his wife on nearly 57 years, Nancy (Sharp) Alderman, and their two children and six grandchildren.
