= Myron Dupree =

American football player (born 1961)

No. 21
- Position: Defensive back

Personal information
- Born: October 15, 1961 (age 65); New York City, New York, U.S.
- Listed height: 5 ft 11 in (1.80 m)
- Listed weight: 180 lb (82 kg)

Career information
- High school: Rocky Mount (NC)
- College: North Carolina Central
- NFL draft: 1983: 7th round, 172nd overall pick

Career history
- Denver Broncos (1983); Philadelphia Eagles (1985)*
- * Offseason or practice squad member only
- Stats at Pro Football Reference

Myron Dupree (born October 15, 1961) is an American former professional football player who was a defensive back for the Denver Broncos of the National Football League (NFL) in 1983. He played college football for the North Carolina Central Eagles. He was selected 172nd overall in the seventh round by Denver Broncos of the 1983 NFL Draft.
