= Zach Thomas (wide receiver) =

American football player (born 1960)

No. 82, 84
- Positions: Wide receiver, return specialist

Personal information
- Born: September 8, 1960 (age 66); Cocoa, Florida, U.S.
- Listed height: 6 ft 0 in (1.83 m)
- Listed weight: 182 lb (83 kg)

Career information
- High school: Cocoa
- College: South Carolina State
- NFL draft: 1983: undrafted

Career history
- Denver Broncos (1983–1984); Tampa Bay Buccaneers (1984)

Career NFL statistics
- Games played: 30
- Receptions: 12
- Receiving yards: 182
- Return TDs: 1
- Stats at Pro Football Reference

Zachary Dwayne Thomas (born September 8, 1960) is an American former professional football player who was a wide receiver in the National Football League (NFL). He was signed by the Denver Broncos as an undrafted free agent in 1983. He played college football for the South Carolina State Bulldogs.

Thomas also played for the Tampa Bay Buccaneers.
