= Mark Cooper (American football) =

American football player (born 1960)

No. 63, 71
- Position: Guard

Personal information
- Born: February 14, 1960 (age 66); Camden, New Jersey, U.S.
- Listed height: 6 ft 5 in (1.96 m)
- Listed weight: 270 lb (122 kg)

Career information
- High school: Miami Killian (Kendall, Florida)
- College: Miami (FL)
- NFL draft: 1983: 2nd round, 31st overall pick

Career history
- Denver Broncos (1983–1987); Tampa Bay Buccaneers (1987–1989)

Career NFL statistics
- Games played: 78
- Games started: 19
- Stats at Pro Football Reference

Mark Samuel Cooper (born February 14, 1960) is an American former professional football player who was a guard in the National Football League (NFL) for the Denver Broncos and the Tampa Bay Buccaneers. He started for the Broncos in Super Bowl XXI. Cooper played college football for the Miami Hurricanes, where he was a Second-team All-South Independent (1982)
