= Bruce Baldwin (American football) =

American gridiron football player (born 1959)

Profile
- Position: Defensive back

Personal information
- Born: September 15, 1959 (age 67); Jacksonville, Illinois, U.S.
- Listed height: 6 ft 1 in (1.85 m)
- Listed weight: 197 lb (89 kg)

Career information
- High school: Searcy (AR)
- College: Harding
- NFL draft: 1983: 5th round, 125th overall pick

Career history
- Denver Broncos (1983)*
- * Offseason or practice squad member only

Bruce Baldwin (born September 15, 1959) is an American former football defensive back who played four seasons for the Harding Bisons and part of one season for the Denver Broncos. Baldwin was selected 125th overall in the fourth round of the 1983 NFL draft by the Denver Broncos.
