= Greg Boyd (American football) =

American football player (born 1952)

No. 65, 77, 72, 97, 76, 95, 98
- Position: Defensive end

Personal information
- Born: September 15, 1952 (age 74); Merced, California, U.S.
- Listed height: 6 ft 6 in (1.98 m)
- Listed weight: 274 lb (124 kg)

Career information
- High school: Edison (Fresno, California)
- College: San Diego State
- NFL draft: 1976: 6th round, 170th overall pick

Career history
- New England Patriots (1976–1979); Denver Broncos (1980–1982); Green Bay Packers (1983); Los Angeles Raiders (1984); San Francisco 49ers (1984); New Jersey Generals (1985)*
- * Offseason or practice squad member only

Awards and highlights
- Super Bowl champion (XIX); Fresno City College Wall of Fame, 2002

Career NFL statistics
- Sacks: 14
- Fumble recoveries: 1
- Safeties: 2
- Stats at Pro Football Reference

Gregory Earl Boyd (born September 15, 1952) is an American former professional football player who was a defensive lineman for nine seasons in the National Football League (NFL) and one in the United States Football League (USFL). He played college football for the San Diego State Aztecs. He has a Super Bowl ring from the 1984 San Francisco 49ers.

Boyd was trained as a professional wrestler by Brad Rheingans, Billy Robinson, Rick Steiner, and Verne Gagne in 1985, working periodically throughout the rest of the decade at the American Wrestling Association, and later as Herkules Boyd for the Catch Wrestling Association in Germany.
