= Hein Poulus =

Dutch-Canadian attorney

Personal information
- Born: February 24, 1947 (age 79); Jakarta, Indonesia

Career information
- College: University of British Columbia; London School of Economics

Career history
- Denver Broncos (1981–1982) Member of the board of directors; Denver Broncos (1983) General manager/vice president
- Executive profile at Pro Football Reference

Hein Poulus (born February 24, 1947) is an Indonesian-born Dutch-Canadian attorney who served as the general manager of the Denver Broncos of the National Football League (NFL) in 1983.

== Early life ==
Poulus was born in Jakarta and educated in Indonesia and the Netherlands. He earned law degrees from both the University of British Columbia and the London School of Economics. He was a member of the Vancouver law firm McAlpine, Poulus and Hordo from 1973 to 1979. In 1979, he went to work for Edgar Kaiser Jr. and held a number of roles in the Kaiser organization, including executive assistant to the chairman, vice-president of corporate communications for Kaiser Resources Ltd., and director of Kaiser Resources and E. F. Kaiser & Co.

== Denver Broncos ==
Poulus was named to the Denver Broncos board of directors when Kaiser purchased the team in 1981. Due to his background in contract law, Pouls took over contract negotiations from general manager Grady Alderman. Poulus was named vice president and general manager of the team on December 3, 1982. He helped the team acquire John Elway and achieve a playoff berth in 1983. Kaiser sold the team in the following year to Pat Bowlen, which led to Poulus quitting in July 1984.

== Legal career ==
After leaving the Broncos, Poulus worked for Southeastern Capital Corporation, a Denver-based leveraged buyout group. He then returned to Canada and resumed his legal career. He was an associate in McAlpine, Poulus and Hordo from 1991 to 1993, a partner at Smith Lyons from 1993 to 1996, a partner at Stikeman Elliott from 1996 to 2019, senior counsel at Harris & Company from 2019 to 2022. In 2022 he founded with Poulus Ensom (now Poulus Ensom Smith) with Joseph Ensom. Poulus has represented Eldorado Gold, Duke Energy, Telus, Epson, Concord Pacific Developments, Slocan Forest Products, and Canaco Resources.

In 1998, Poulus was appointed legal counsel for the public inquiry into the fundraising activities of the New Democratic Party and the Nanaimo Commonwealth Holding Society. However, the inquiry was put on hold in order to not prejudice criminal charges against former NDP finance minister Dave Stupich and others involved in the Bingogate scandal.

Poulus was the lead lawyer for Francesco Aquilini in a civil suit brought by former business partners Tom Gaglardi and Ryan Beedie over Aquilini's purchase of the Vancouver Canucks. In 2008, Justice Catherine Wedge ruled in favor of Aquilini.

Poulus has also served as chairman of Tournigan Energy and Longview Capital and was a director of the Vancouver Symphony Society.
