= Gerald Willhite =

American football player (born 1959)

No. 47
- Position: Running back

Personal information
- Born: May 30, 1959 (age 67); Sacramento, California, U.S.
- Listed height: 5 ft 10 in (1.78 m)
- Listed weight: 200 lb (91 kg)

Career information
- High school: Cordova (Rancho Cordova, California)
- College: San Jose State
- NFL draft: 1982: 1st round, 21st overall pick

Career history
- Denver Broncos (1982–1988)

Career NFL statistics
- Rushing yards: 1,688
- Rushing average: 4.4
- Rushing touchdowns: 17
- Stats at Pro Football Reference

Gerald William Willhite (born May 30, 1959) is an American former professional football player who was a running back for the Denver Broncos of the National Football League (NFL). He played college football for the San Jose State Spartans. He was selected by the Broncos in the first round (21st overall) of the 1982 NFL draft.

Willhite was born in Sacramento, California, and graduated from Cordova High School of Rancho Cordova, California, in 1977. Though Gerald's younger brother Kevin Willhite would become one of the top high school football stars in the state, he did not play football in high school, mainly due to his small size of 5'2 and 98 pounds. However, Gerald was a star at track and field and wrestling, finishing one wrestling season with an undefeated 24–0 record.

After high school, Willhite attended American River College, deciding to forgo wrestling and focus entirely on track and field. No longer concerned with wrestling weight restrictions, Willhite gained 90 pounds between his freshman and sophomore year. He also grew 7 inches, and eventually decided to join the school's football team. In his two seasons at ARC, he rushed for over 1,000 yards and caught at least 50 passes both times. He then transferred to San Jose State University, where he went on to rush for 2,364 yards and 20 touchdowns over his final two seasons in college football, while also catching 107 passes for 927 yards and 8 more scores. Willhite still holds the school records for most average yards gained rushing per game at 107.5 and pass receptions in a game with 18 in the 1981 California Bowl against University of Toledo.

After college, Willhite played for the Broncos from 1982 to 1988. In his rookie season, Willhite was Denver's leading rusher, rushing for 347 yards in a season shortened to 9 games by a players strike. He appeared in Super Bowl XXI against the New York Giants. In his 7 NFL seasons, he rushed for 1,688 yards and 17 touchdowns, with a 4.4 yards per carry average, while also catching 207 passes for 1,767 yards and 5 scores. On special teams, he returned 101 punts for 1,012 yards and a touchdown, along with 26 kickoffs for 512 yards. Willhite was inducted into the Sacramento Sports Hall of Fame in 2020.

Willhite owned and operated GW Spices BBQ Restaurant in Rancho Cucamonga, California.
