= Nathan Poole =

American football player (born 1956)

No. 35, 34
- Position: Running back

Personal information
- Born: December 17, 1956 (age 69); Alexander City, Alabama, U.S.
- Listed height: 5 ft 9 in (1.75 m)
- Listed weight: 210 lb (95 kg)

Career information
- College: Louisville
- NFL draft: 1979: 10th round, 250th overall pick

Career history
- Cincinnati Bengals (1979–1980); Toronto Argonauts (1981); Denver Broncos (1982–1983); Seattle Seahawks (1985)*; Denver Broncos (1985-1987)
- * Offseason or practice squad member only

Career NFL statistics
- Rushing yards: 423
- Rushing average: 3.4
- Touchdowns: 5
- Stats at Pro Football Reference

Nathan Lewis Poole (born December 17, 1956) is an American former professional football player who was a running back in the National Football League (NFL).

He was selected in the 10th round (250th overall) of the 1979 NFL draft by the Cincinnati Bengals after playing college football for the University of Louisville. He missed playing for the Bengals in Super Bowl XVI, due to injury. He played in the NFL for six seasons, two for the Bengals and four for the Denver Broncos.
