= Clint Sampson =

American football player (1961–2005)

No. 84
- Position: Wide receiver

Personal information
- Born: January 4, 1961; Los Angeles, California, U.S.
- Died: December 25, 2005 (aged 44); Los Angeles, California, U.S.
- Listed height: 5 ft 11 in (1.80 m)
- Listed weight: 183 lb (83 kg)

Career information
- High school: Crenshaw (Los Angeles)
- College: San Diego State
- NFL draft: 1983: 3rd round, 60th overall pick

Career history
- Denver Broncos (1983–1986); Buffalo Bills (1988)*; San Diego Chargers (1989)*
- * Offseason or practice squad member only

Career NFL statistics
- Receptions: 66
- Receiving yards: 1,014
- Receiving touchdowns: 8
- Stats at Pro Football Reference

Clinton Bernard Sampson (January 4, 1961 – December 25, 2005) was an American professional football player who was a wide receiver for the Denver Broncos of the National Football League (NFL). He played college football for the San Diego State Aztecs and was selected by the Broncos in the third round of the 1983 NFL draft.

Sampson died at the age of 44 on December 25, 2005, due to injuries sustained in a car accident.
