= Keith Bishop (American football) =

American football player (born 1957)

No. 54
- Position: Guard

Personal information
- Born: March 10, 1957 (age 69); La Jolla, California, U.S.
- Listed height: 6 ft 3 in (1.91 m)
- Listed weight: 260 lb (118 kg)

Career information
- High school: Midland (TX) Lee High School
- College: Nebraska; Baylor
- NFL draft: 1980: 6th round, 157th overall pick

Career history
- Denver Broncos (1980–1989)

Awards and highlights
- 2× Pro Bowl (1986, 1987); Denver Broncos 50th Anniversary Team

Career NFL statistics
- Games played: 129
- Games started: 87
- Fumble recoveries: 3
- Stats at Pro Football Reference

Keith Bryan Bishop (born March 10, 1957) is an American former professional football player who was a guard for 10 seasons with the Denver Broncos of the National Football League (NFL). He was a Pro Bowl selection in 1986 and 1987.

After a career in Dallas, TX with the DEA, Bishop returned to football and the Denver Broncos in 2007, as an offensive line coaching intern. He was married to Mary Bishop, and they are the parents of son, John, and daughters, Rachel and Sarah.

Bishop is the Broncos' vice president of security.

== Career ==
Keith Bishop is a former official of the Drug Enforcement Administration (DEA) who served for approximately 20 years before retiring around 2012. During his career, he held positions including Assistant Regional Director and Assistant Special Agent in Charge (RAC). In his final assignment, Bishop served as Country Attaché at the DEA Southwest Asia Regional Office in Kabul, Afghanistan, where he was posted from approximately 2008 to 2012, covering Afghanistan and Pakistan.
