= Ken Lanier =

American football player (born 1959

No. 76, 79, 67
- Position: Offensive tackle

Personal information
- Born: July 8, 1959 (age 67); Columbus, Ohio, U.S.
- Listed height: 6 ft 3 in (1.91 m)
- Listed weight: 290 lb (132 kg)

Career information
- High school: Marion-Franklin (Columbus)
- College: Florida State
- NFL draft: 1981: 5th round, 125th overall pick

Career history
- Denver Broncos (1981–1992); Los Angeles Raiders (1993); Denver Broncos (1994)

Awards and highlights
- Second-team All-American (1980)

Career NFL statistics
- Games played: 179
- Games started: 167
- Fumble recoveries: 4
- Stats at Pro Football Reference

Kenneth Wayne Lanier (born July 8, 1959) is an American former professional football player who was an offensive tackle for 14 seasons in the National Football League (NFL), including 13 of those with the Denver Broncos. He played college football for the Florida State Seminoles.
