= 1989 Denver Broncos season =

American football team season

- Owner: Pat Bowlen
- General manager: John Beake
- Head coach: Dan Reeves
- Offensive coordinator: Chan Gailey
- Defensive coordinator: Wade Phillips
- Home stadium: Mile High Stadium

Results
- Record: 11–5
- Division place: 1st AFC West
- Playoffs: Won Divisional Playoffs (vs. Steelers) 24–23; Won AFC Championship (vs. Browns) 37–21; Lost Super Bowl XXIV (vs. 49ers) 10–55
- Pro Bowlers: QB John Elway; DT Greg Kragen; LB Karl Mecklenburg; S Dennis Smith; K David Treadwell

Uniform
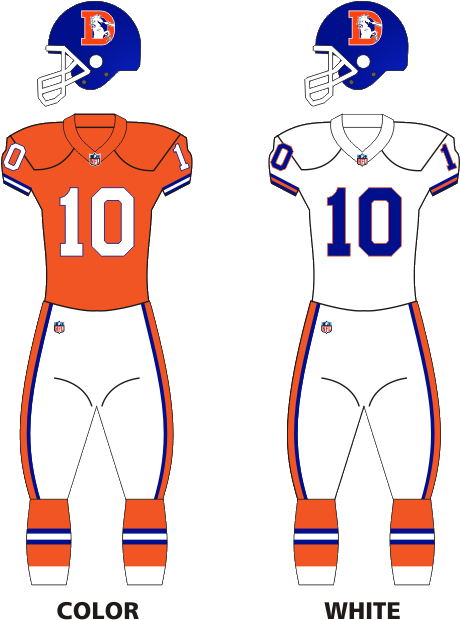

The 1989 Denver Broncos season was the team's 30th year in professional football and its 20th with the National Football League (NFL). The head coach was Dan Reeves while Chan Gailey was the offensive coordinator and Wade Phillips was the defensive coordinator. In the postseason Denver won a nail biter over the Pittsburgh Steelers 24–23 then cruised over the Cleveland Browns 37–21 in the AFC Championship Game.

The season ended with the Broncos being blown out 55–10 in Super Bowl XXIV by the San Francisco 49ers.

== Offseason ==
=== NFL draft ===
1989 Denver Broncos draft
Round	Pick	Player	Position	College	Notes
1	20	Steve Atwater * ^{†}	S	Arkansas	
1	Supp	Bobby Humphrey	RB	Alabama	
2	41	Doug Widell	G	Boston College	
2	47	Warren Powers	DE	Maryland	
3	69	Darrell Hamilton	T	North Carolina	
4	97	Jake McCullough	DE	Clemson	
5	134	Darren Carrington	S	Northern Arizona	
6	152	Anthony Stafford	WR	Oklahoma	
7	180	Melvin Bratton	RB	Miami (FL)	
8	208	Paul Green	TE	USC	
9	236	Monte Smith	G	North Dakota State	
9	241	Wayne Williams	RB	Florida	
10	264	Anthony Butts	DE	Mississippi State	
11	292	Richard Shelton	DB	Liberty	
12	320	John Javis	WR	Howard	
Made roster † Pro Football Hall of Fame * Made at least one Pro Bowl during career

=== Undrafted free agents ===
1989 undrafted free agents of note
Player	Position	College
Pat Hegarty	Quarterback	UTEP
Chris Rule	Quarterback	Colorado State

== Personnel ==
1989 Denver Broncos staff
Front office: President and chief executive officer – Pat Bowlen; General manager – John Beake; Director of football operations – Lide Huggins; Director of player personnel – Reed Johnson; Administrative assistant to head coach and general manager – Joe DeCamillis; Head coaches: Vice-president/head coach – Dan Reeves; Special assistant – Marvin Bass; Offensive coaches: Offensive coordinator/wide receivers – Chan Gailey; Quarterbacks – Mike Shanahan (hired Oct 16); Running backs – Mo Forte; Tight ends/assistant offensive line – Pete Mangurian; Offensive line – George Henshaw	Defensive coaches: Defensive coordinator – Wade Phillips; Defensive line – Earl Leggett; Linebackers – Mike Nolan; Defensive backs – Charlie Waters; Special teams coaches: Special teams – Harold Richardson; Strength and conditioning: Strength/conditioning – Al Miller; Assistant strength and conditioning – Barney Chavous

=== Final roster ===
1989 Denver Broncos roster
Quarterbacks (QB): 7 John Elway; 8 Gary Kubiak; Running backs (RB): 40 Jeff Alexander FB; 35 Ken Bell; 32 Mel Bratton FB; 26 Bobby Humphrey; 30 Steve Sewell; 23 Sammy Winder; Wide receivers (WR): 80 Mark Jackson; 82 Vance Johnson KR; 84 Ricky Nattiel KR; 83 Mike Young; Tight ends (TE): 88 Clarence Kay; 87 Pat Kelly; 89 Orson Mobley	Offensive linemen (OL): 54 Keith Bishop; 66 Jim Juriga G; 72 Keith Kartz C; 76 Ken Lanier T; 60 Gerald Perry T; 57 Mike Ruether C; 65 Monte Smith G; 67 Doug Widell G; Defensive linemen (DL): 92 Alphonso Carreker DE; 68 Brad Henke DE/DT; 90 Ron Holmes DE; 71 Greg Kragen NT; 91 Warren Powers DE; 61 Andre Townsend	Linebackers (LB): 56 Michael Brooks OLB; 58 Scott Curtis ILB; 55 Rick Dennison ILB; 73 Simon Fletcher OLB; 97 Bruce Klosterman OLB; 59 Tim Lucas OLB; 77 Karl Mecklenburg ILB; 51 Marc Munford ILB; Defensive backs (DB): 27 Steve Atwater FS; 34 Tyrone Braxton CB; 29 Darren Carrington CB; 25 Kip Corrington FS; 36 Mark Haynes CB; 24 Wymon Henderson CB; 48 Randy Robbins SS; 49 Dennis Smith SS; Special teams (ST): 2 Mike Horan P; 9 David Treadwell K	Practice squad: 86 Paul Green TE; 69 Darrell Hamilton T; 19 Pat Hegarty QB; 78 Jeff Mickel T; 52 Ron Sancho LB; Reserve: 64 Billy Bryan C (IR); 96 Jake McCullough DE (IR); 74 Andrew Provence DT (IR); 94 Randy Thornton LB (IR); Rookies in italics 47 active, 4 reserve, 5 practice squad

== Regular season ==
One of Denver's new major additions was rookie running back Bobby Humphrey, who rushed for 1,151 yards, caught 22 passes for 156 yards, and scored 8 touchdowns. Humphrey gave the Broncos a powerful running attack that they lacked in their previous Super Bowl seasons. The defense had a new weapon as well: rookie free safety Steve Atwater. Together with veteran defensive backs Dennis Smith, Wymon Henderson and Tyrone Braxton, the Broncos secondary combined for 14 interceptions. Braxton lead the team with 6, which he returned for 103 yards and a touchdown, while also recovering 2 fumbles. Another new addition was defensive end Ron Holmes, who recorded 9 sacks. Holmes, along with veteran linebackers Karl Mecklenburg (7.5 sacks and 4 fumble recoveries) and Simon Fletcher (12 sacks) gave Denver one of the top defensive lines in the AFC.

Veteran receiver Vance Johnson had the best season of his career, catching 76 passes for 1,095 yards and 7 touchdowns, while also returning 12 punts for 118 yards. However, quarterback John Elway played inconsistently during the regular season, throwing just as many interceptions as touchdowns (18) and recording only a 73.7 passer rating.

=== Schedule ===
Week	Date	Opponent	Result	Record	Venue	Attendance	Recap
1	September 10	**Kansas City Chiefs**	**W** 34–20	1–0	Mile High Stadium	74,284	Recap
2	September 18	at Buffalo Bills	**W** 28–14	2–0	Rich Stadium	78,176	Recap
3	September 24	**Los Angeles Raiders**	**W** 31–21	3–0	Mile High Stadium	75,754	Recap
4	October 1	at Cleveland Browns	**L** 13–16	3–1	Cleveland Municipal Stadium	78,637	Recap
5	October 8	**San Diego Chargers**	**W** 16–10	4–1	Mile High Stadium	75,222	Recap
6	October 15	Indianapolis Colts	**W** 14–3	5–1	Mile High Stadium	74,680	Recap
7	October 22	at **Seattle Seahawks**	**W** 24–21 (OT)	6–1	Kingdome	62,353	Recap
8	October 29	Philadelphia Eagles	**L** 24–28	6–2	Mile High Stadium	75,065	Recap
9	November 5	Pittsburgh Steelers	**W** 34–7	7–2	Mile High Stadium	74,739	Recap
10	November 12	at **Kansas City Chiefs**	**W** 16–13	8–2	Arrowhead Stadium	76,245	Recap
11	November 20	at Washington Redskins	**W** 14–10	9–2	RFK Stadium	52,975	Recap
12	November 26	**Seattle Seahawks**	**W** 41–14	10–2	Mile High Stadium	75,117	Recap
13	December 3	at **Los Angeles Raiders**	**L** 13–16 (OT)	10–3	Los Angeles Memorial Coliseum	87,560	Recap
14	December 10	New York Giants	**L** 7–14	10–4	Mile High Stadium	63,283	Recap
15	December 16	at Phoenix Cardinals	**W** 37–0	11–4	Sun Devil Stadium	56,071	Recap
16	December 24	at **San Diego Chargers**	**L** 16–19	11–5	Jack Murphy Stadium	50,524	Recap
Note: Intra-division opponents are in **bold** text.

=== Game summaries ===
==== Week 2 ====
Team	1	2	3	4	Total
• Broncos	5	13	3	7	28
Bills	0	0	7	7	14

- Date: September 18
- Location: Rich Stadium, Orchard Park, New York
- Game start: 9:00 p.m. EST
- Game attendance: 78,176
- Game weather: 57 °F (14 °C); wind 5 mph (8.0 km/h)
- Referee: Bob McElwee
- TV announcers (ABC): Al Michaels, Frank Gifford, and Dan Dierdorf

Scoring summary
Q1	DEN	Mueller tackled by Brooks in end zone	DEN 2–0
Q1	DEN	Treadwell 22 yard field goal	DEN 5–0
Q2	DEN	Treadwell 33 yard field goal	DEN 8–0
Q2	DEN	Johnson 19 yard pass from Elway (Treadwell kick)	DEN 15–0
Q2	DEN	Treadwell 46 yard field goal	DEN 18–0
Q3	DEN	Treadwell 24 yard field goal	DEN 21–0
Q3	BUF	Kinnebrew 1 yard run (Norwood kick)	DEN 21–7
Q4	BUF	Harmon 20 yard pass from Kelly (Norwood kick)	DEN 21–14
Q4	DEN	Humphrey 5 yard run (Treadwell kick)	DEN 28–14

==== Week 3 ====
Team	1	2	3	4	Total
Raiders	0	0	7	14	21
• Broncos	21	7	0	3	31

- Date: September 24
- Location: Mile High Stadium, Denver, Colorado
- Game start: 2:00 p.m. MST
- Game weather: 62 °F (17 °C), wind 11 mph (18 km/h)
- Referee: Jerry Markbreit
- TV announcers (NBC): Dick Enberg and Bill Walsh

Scoring summary
1	DEN	John Elway 29 yard run (David Treadwell kick)	Broncos 7–0
1	DEN	Jeff Alexander 1 yard run (David Treadwell kick)	Broncos 14–0
1	DEN	Mark Jackson 46 yard pass from John Elway (David Treadwell kick)	Broncos 21–0
2	DEN	Mark Jackson 11 yard pass from John Elway (David Treadwell kick)	Broncos 28–0
3	LA	Lionel Washington 22 yard interception return (Jeff Jaeger kick)	Broncos 28–7
4	LA	Mervyn Fernandez 75 yard pass from Jay Schroeder (Jeff Jaeger kick)	Broncos 28–14
4	LA	Linden King 15 yard fumble return (Jeff Jaeger kick)	Broncos 28–21
4	DEN	David Treadwell 38 yard field goal	Broncos 31–21

==== Week 14 ====
Team	1	2	3	4	Total
• Giants	0	14	0	0	14
Broncos	0	0	0	7	7

- Date: December 10
- Location: Mile High Stadium, Denver, Colorado
- Game start: 2:00 p.m. MST
- Game weather: 31 °F (−1 °C), wind 12 mph (19 km/h)
- Referee: Jerry Markbreit
- TV announcers (CBS): Pat Summerall and John Madden

Scoring summary
2	NYG	Ottis Anderson 3 yard run (Bjorn Nittmo kick)	Giants 7–0
2	NYG	David Meggett 57 yard pass from Phil Simms (Bjorn Nittmo kick)	Giants 14–0
4	DEN	Mike Young 32 yard pass from John Elway (David Treadwell kick)	Giants 14–7

=== Playoffs ===
Round	Date	Opponent (seed)	Result	Record	Venue	Attendance	Recap
Divisional	January 7, 1990	Pittsburgh Steelers (5)	**W** 24–23	1–0	Mile High Stadium	75,868	Recap
AFC Championship	January 14, 1990	Cleveland Browns (2)	**W** 37–21	2–0	Mile High Stadium	76,005	Recap
Super Bowl XXIV	January 28, 1990	San Francisco 49ers (N1)	**L** 10–55	2–1	Louisiana Superdome	72,919	Recap

=== Standings ===
AFC West
	W	L	T	PCT	DIV	CONF	PF	PA	STK
^{(1)} Denver Broncos	11	5	0	.688	6–2	9–3	362	226	L1
Kansas City Chiefs	8	7	1	.531	3–5	6–7–1	318	286	W1
Los Angeles Raiders	8	8	0	.500	3–5	6–6	315	297	L2
Seattle Seahawks	7	9	0	.438	4–4	7–5	241	327	L1
San Diego Chargers	6	10	0	.375	4–4	4–8	266	290	W2
