= List of Denver Broncos first-round draft picks =

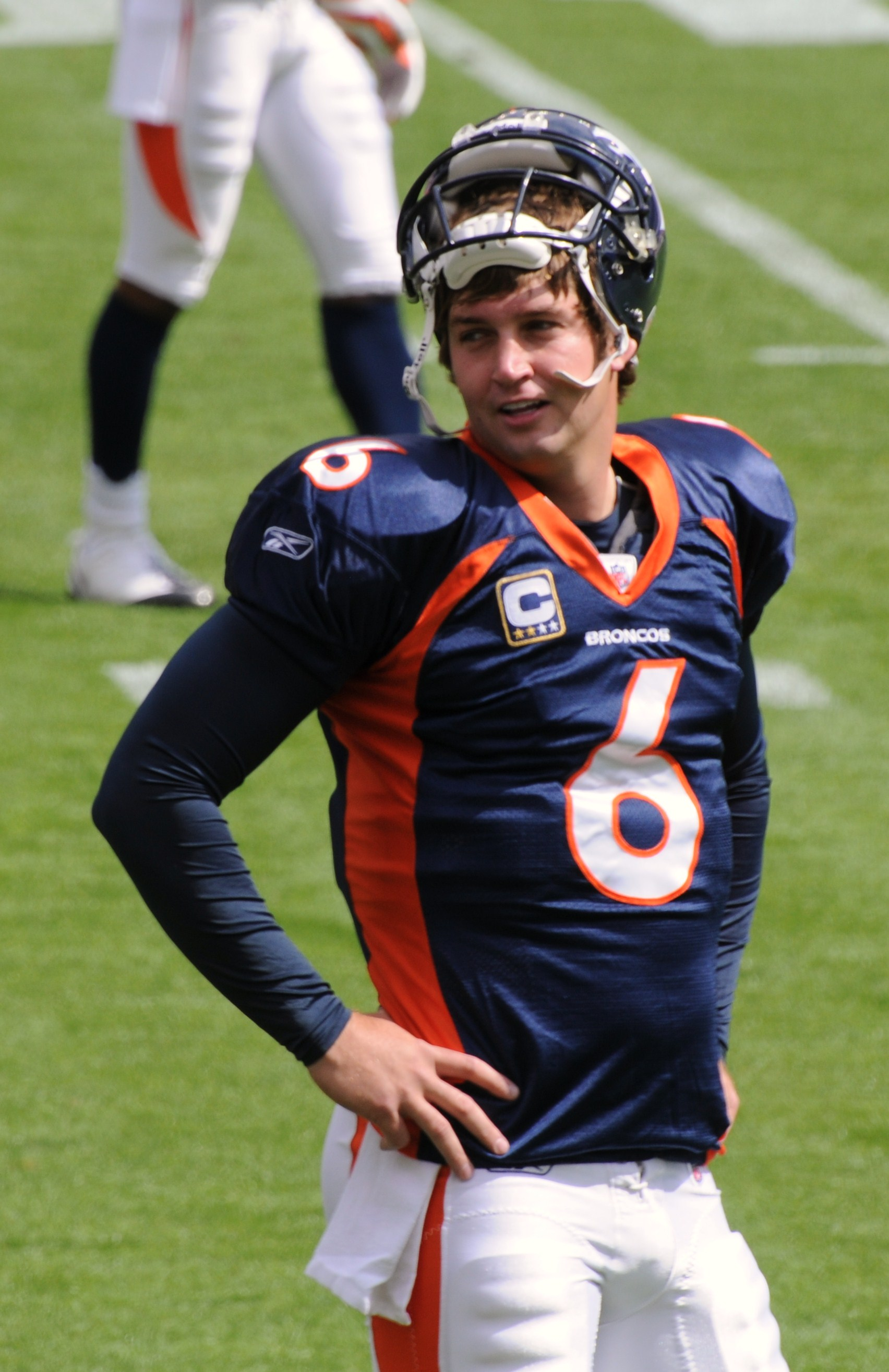
Jay Cutler earned a Pro Bowl selection with the Broncos in 2008.

The Denver Broncos are a professional American football team based in Denver, Colorado. They are members of the American Football Conference West Division in the National Football League (NFL). The franchise was formed on August 14, 1959, to compete in the American Football League (AFL). The first AFL Draft was held three months later. The last AFL draft the Broncos participated in was the 1966 draft, due to them joining the NFL as part of the AFL–NFL merger on June 8, 1966.

The Broncos first participated in the NFL Annual Player Selection Meeting, more commonly known as the NFL draft, in 1967. In the NFL Draft, each NFL franchise annually seeks to add new players to its roster. Teams are ranked in reverse order based on the previous season's record; the worst record picks first, the second-worst picking second and so on. The two exceptions to this order are made for teams that appeared in the previous Super Bowl; the Super Bowl champion always picks 32nd, and the Super Bowl loser always picks 31st. Teams have the option of trading away their picks to other teams for different picks, players, cash, or a combination thereof. Thus, it is not uncommon for a team's actual draft pick to differ from their assigned draft pick, or for a team to have extra or no draft picks in any round due to these trades.

The Broncos selected Roger LeClerc, a placekicker from Trinity College, in the 1960 AFL Draft. In their first NFL Draft, the Broncos selected Floyd Little, a running back from Syracuse University. The Broncos have selected players from the University of Nebraska, University of Florida, and University of Tennessee three times each, the most from any university in the first-round. The team's most recent selections were Tim Tebow, a quarterback from Florida University and Demaryius Thomas, wide receiver from Georgia Tech. Three selections, Floyd Little, Merlin Olsen, and Bob Brown, were enshrined in the Pro Football Hall of Fame in 1982 and 2004, respectively. In 1991, Mike Croel became the first Bronco to win the Defensive Rookie of the Year award, receiving 68 out of 82 votes.

The Broncos' latest first-round pick is University of Texas cornerback Jahdae Barron, who they picked 20th overall in the 2025 NFL draft.

== Key ==
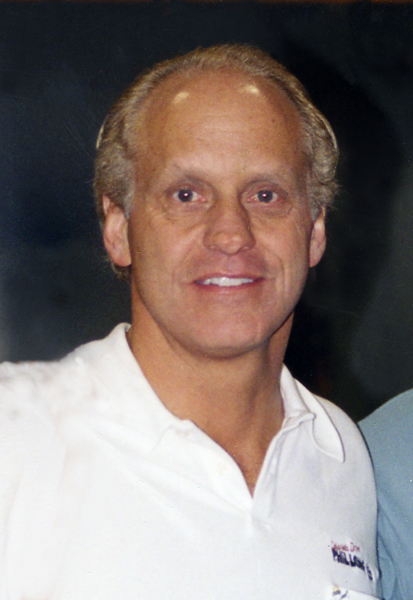
Randy Gradishar, a seven-time Pro Bowl participant and member of the Pro Football Hall of Fame

Table key
^	Indicates the player was inducted into the Pro Football Hall of Fame.
—	The Broncos did not draft a player in the first round that year.
Year	Each year links to an article about that particular AFL, Common, or NFL draft.
Pick	Indicates the number of the pick within the first round
Position	Indicates the position of the player in the NFL
College	The player's college football team

== Player selections ==
Denver Broncos first-round draft picks
Year	Pick	Player name	Position	College	Notes
1960	—	Roger LeClerc	C	Trinity College	
1961	—	Bob Gaiters	HB	New Mexico State	
1962	—	Merlin Olsen ^	DT	Utah State	
1963	—	Kermit Alexander	CB	UCLA	
1964	—	Bob Brown ^	OT	Nebraska	
1965	—	No pick	—	—	^{[a]}
1966	—	Jerry Shay	OT	Purdue	
1967	6	Floyd Little ^	RB	Syracuse	
1968	—	No pick	—	—	^{[b]}
1969	—	No pick	—	—	^{[b]}
1970	11	Bobby Anderson	RB	Colorado	
1971	12	Marv Montgomery	OT	USC	^{[c]}
1972	5	Riley Odoms	TE	Houston	
1973	9	Otis Armstrong	RB	Purdue	
1974	14	Randy Gradishar ^	ILB	Ohio State	
1975	17	Louis Wright	CB	San Jose State	
1976	15	Tom Glassic	G	Virginia	
1977	18	Steve Schindler	G	Boston College	
1978	27	Don Latimer	NT	Miami (FL)	
1979	22	Kelvin Clark	OT	Nebraska	
1980	—	No pick	—	—	^{[d]}
1981	15	Dennis Smith	S	USC	
1982	21	Gerald Willhite	RB	San Jose State	^{[e]}
1983	4	Chris Hinton	G	Northwestern	
1984	—	No pick	—	—	^{[f]}
1985	26	Steve Sewell	RB	Oklahoma	
1986	—	No pick	—	—	^{[g]}
1987	27	Ricky Nattiel	WR	Florida	
1988	26	Ted Gregory	DT	Syracuse	
1989	20	Steve Atwater ^	S	Arkansas	^{[h]}
1990	—	No pick	—	—	^{[i]}
1991	4	Mike Croel	OLB	Nebraska	
1992	25	Tommy Maddox	QB	UCLA	
1993	11	Dan Williams	DE	Toledo	^{[j]}
1994	—	No pick	—	—	^{[k]}
1995	—	No pick	—	—	^{[l]}
1996	15	John Mobley	OLB	Kutztown	
1997	28	Trevor Pryce	DT	Clemson	
1998	30	Marcus Nash	WR	Tennessee	
1999	31	Al Wilson	MLB	Tennessee	
2000	15	Deltha O'Neal	CB	California	^{[m]}
2001	24	Willie Middlebrooks	CB	Minnesota	
2002	19	Ashley Lelie	WR	Hawaii	
2003	20	George Foster	OT	Georgia	
2004	17	D. J. Williams	MLB	Miami (FL)	^{[n]}
2005	—	No pick	—	—	^{[o]}
2006	11	Jay Cutler	QB	Vanderbilt	^{[p]}
2007	17	Jarvis Moss	DE	Florida	^{[q]}
2008	12	Ryan Clady	OT	Boise State	
2009	12	Knowshon Moreno	RB	Georgia	
2009	18	Robert Ayers	DE	Tennessee	^{[r]}
2010	22	Demaryius Thomas	WR	Georgia Tech	^{[s]}
2010	25	Tim Tebow	QB	Florida	^{[t]}
2011	2	Von Miller	OLB	Texas A&M	
2012	—	No pick	—	—	
2013	28	Sylvester Williams	DT	North Carolina	
2014	31	Bradley Roby	CB	Ohio State	
2015	23	Shane Ray	OLB	Missouri	
2016	26	Paxton Lynch	QB	Memphis	
2017	20	Garett Bolles	OT	Utah	
2018	5	Bradley Chubb	DE	NC State	
2019	20	Noah Fant	TE	Iowa	
2020	15	Jerry Jeudy	WR	Alabama	
2021	9	Patrick Surtain II	CB	Alabama	
2022	No pick (traded to Seattle for Russell Wilson)				
2023	No pick (traded to Seattle for Russell Wilson)				
2024	12	Bo Nix	QB	Oregon	
2025	20	Jahdae Barron	CB	Texas	
2026	—	No pick	—	—	

== Footnotes ==
- ^{a} The Broncos traded their 1965 first-round pick along with defensive tackle Bud McFadin to the Houston Oilers for quarterback Jacky Lee.
- ^{b 1} ^{2} On August 15, 1967, the Broncos traded their No. 4 overall pick in the 1968 Draft and No. 9 overall pick in the 1969 Draft to the San Diego Chargers for quarterback Steve Tensi.
- ^{c} On January 28, 1971, the Broncos traded their No. 9 overall pick in the 1971 Draft and defensive end Alden Roche to the Green Bay Packers for the No. 12 overall pick in the 1971 Draft and quarterback Don Horn.
- ^{d} On February 1, 1980, the Broncos traded their No. 20 overall pick and a second-round pick in the 1980 Draft along with quarterback Craig Penrose to the New York Jets for quarterback Matt Robinson.
- ^{e} The Broncos traded their No. 19 overall pick in the 1982 Draft to the Buffalo Bills for the No. 21 overall pick and a fourth-round pick in the 1982 Draft.
- ^{f} On May 2, 1983, the Broncos traded their No. 19 overall pick in the 1984 Draft along with quarterback Mark Herrmann and guard Chris Hinton to the Baltimore Colts for quarterback John Elway.
- ^{g} On October 9, 1984, the Broncos traded their No. 21 overall pick and third-round pick in 1986 Draft and fifth-round pick in 1987 Draft to the Cincinnati Bengals for the draft rights of Ricky Hunley.
- ^{h} On April 23, 1989, the Broncos traded their No. 13 overall pick in the 1989 Draft to the Cleveland Browns for the No. 20 overall, second, fifth, and ninth-round picks in the 1989 Draft.
- ^{i} On July 7, 1989, the Broncos selected Bobby Humphrey in the 1989 Supplemental Draft; as a result, they forfeited their rights to a first-round pick in 1990 Draft.
- ^{j} The Broncos traded their No. 14 overall pick and a third-round pick in the 1993 Draft to the Cleveland Browns for the No. 11 overall pick.
- ^{k} On August 23, 1993, the Broncos traded their No. 18 overall pick and sixth-round pick in the 1994 draft and a second-round pick in the 1995 draft to the Minnesota Vikings for offensive tackle Gary Zimmerman.
- ^{l} On April 24, 1994, the Broncos traded a third-round selection in the 1994 Draft and a first-round pick in the 1995 Draft to the Atlanta Falcons for wide receiver Mike Pritchard and a seventh-round pick in the 1995 Draft.
- ^{m} On April 12, 2000, the Broncos traded their No. 10 overall pick in the 2000 Draft to the Baltimore Ravens for the No. 15 overall pick and a second-round pick in the 2000 Draft.
- ^{n} On April 9, 2004, the Broncos traded No. 24 overall pick in the 2004 Draft along with cornerback Deltha O'Neal and a fourth-round pick to the Cincinnati Bengals for the No. 17 overall pick.
- ^{o} On April 19, 2005, the Broncos traded their No. 25 overall pick in the 2005 Draft to the Washington Redskins for a third-round pick in the 2005 Draft, No. 22 overall and fourth-round picks in the 2006 Draft.
- ^{p} On March 21, 2006, the Broncos traded their No. 29 overall pick along with a third-round pick in the 2006 Draft and fourth-round pick in the 2007 Draft to the Atlanta Falcons for the No. 15 overall pick.
  On April 19, 2006, the Broncos traded their No. 22 overall pick to the San Francisco 49ers for second and third-round picks.
  On April 29, 2006, the Broncos traded their No. 15 overall pick to the St. Louis Rams for the No. 11 overall pick and a third-round pick in the 2006 Draft.
- ^{q} On April 28, 2007, the Broncos traded their No. 21 overall pick along with a third and sixth-round picks to the Jacksonville Jaguars for the No. 17 overall pick.
- ^{r} On April 2, 2009, the Broncos traded quarterback Jay Cutler and a fifth-round pick in the 2009 Draft to the Chicago Bears for the No. 18 overall pick in the 2009 Draft along with a third-round pick in the 2009 Draft and a first-round pick in the 2010 Draft.
- ^{s} On April 22, 2010, the Patriots traded this selection to the Broncos for a first-round selection (24th overall; traded to Dallas, who selected Dez Bryant) and a fourth-round selection it acquired from San Francisco (113th overall; New England selected Aaron Hernandez).
- ^{t} On April 22, 2010, the Ravens traded this selection to the Broncos for a second-round selection it acquired from Miami (43rd overall; Baltimore selected Sergio Kindle), a third-round selection it acquired from Philadelphia (70th overall; Baltimore selected Ed Dickson), and a fourth-round selection (114th overall; Baltimore selected Dennis Pitta).
