= Super Bowl XXIV =

1990 Edition of the Super Bowl

San Francisco 49ers (1) (NFC) (14–2)	Denver Broncos (1) (AFC) (11–5)
55	10
Head coach: George Seifert	Head coach: Dan Reeves
	1	2	3	4	Total
SF	13	14	14	14	55
DEN	3	0	7	0	10
- Date: January 28, 1990
- Kickoff time: 4:23 p.m. CST (UTC-6)
- Stadium: Louisiana Superdome; New Orleans, Louisiana
- MVP: Joe Montana, quarterback
- Favorite: 49ers by 12
- Referee: Dick Jorgensen
- Attendance: 72,919

Ceremonies
- National anthem: Aaron Neville
- Coin toss: Mel Blount, Terry Bradshaw, Art Shell, and Willie Wood
- Halftime show: Pete Fountain, Doug Kershaw, and Irma Thomas

TV in the United States
- Network: CBS
- Announcers: Pat Summerall, John Madden, Irv Cross, and Will McDonough
- Nielsen ratings: 39.0 (est. 73.85 million viewers)
- Market share: 63
- Cost of 30-second commercial: $700,000

Radio in the United States
- Network: CBS Radio
- Announcers: Jack Buck, Hank Stram, and Randy Cross

Super Bowl XXIV was an American football game played to decide the National Football League (NFL) champion for the 1989 season between the National Football Conference (NFC) and defending Super Bowl champion San Francisco 49ers and the American Football Conference (AFC) champion Denver Broncos. The 49ers defeated the Broncos by the score of 55–10. The game was played on January 28, 1990, at the Louisiana Superdome in New Orleans, Louisiana. 49ers Quarterback Joe Montana, who set eight player and additional records during the game, was named Super Bowl MVP for the third and final time in his career.

It was the 49ers' fourth Super Bowl appearance as they finished the 1989 regular season with a league best 14–2 record. They entered the game in a bid to become the first back-to-back Super Bowl champions since the Pittsburgh Steelers, following their victory in Super Bowl XXIII the previous year. The Broncos, who posted an 11–5 regular season record, entered the Super Bowl looking to avoid tying the Minnesota Vikings with four Super Bowl losses, as well as the Vikings' record of losing three Super Bowls in four years.

Throughout the game, the 49ers displayed an insurmountable dominance over the Broncos. Denver consistently struggled throughout the game as the offense was repeatedly stalled and made costly mistakes that the 49ers always capitalized on. Denver's only score of the first half was a field goal made by kicker David Treadwell halfway through the first quarter, making the game 27–3 by halftime. In the second half, the 49ers picked up where they left off. With the exception of Denver's only touchdown of the night in the third quarter, which occurred following a pass interference call on San Francisco's defense that set them up to score on the 49ers 1-yard line, the 49ers only continued to take advantage of Denver's offensive struggles, delivering multiple touchdowns in the remaining two quarters. Now comfortable with their lead of 55–10, 49ers backup quarterback Steve Young replaced Joe Montana. Following numerous punts by the Broncos, Young led the team to Denver's 30-yard line as the game ended.

It was the 49ers' fourth Super Bowl championship, and their second in as many seasons. With the win, the 49ers became only the second NFL/NFC team to repeat since the Green Bay Packers in 1967. The Broncos were handed their fourth Super Bowl loss in franchise history, following losses in 1977's Super Bowl XII, 1986's Super Bowl XXI, and 1987's Super Bowl XXII. The game set numerous Super Bowl records, including the most points scored by one team (55), the largest margin of victory (45 points), and the most touchdowns scored by one team (8).

Super Bowl XXIV has been ranked as one of the worst Super Bowls, due to the 49ers' dominance over the Broncos. The game's broadcast on CBS was watched by around 73.85 million viewers, the smallest Super Bowl audience since 1969's Super Bowl III.

== Background ==
=== Host selection process ===
NFL owners voted to award Super Bowl XXIV to New Orleans, Louisiana on March 14, 1985, during their March 10–15, 1985 meetings held in Phoenix. This would be a record seventh time that New Orleans hosted the Super Bowl. Tulane Stadium was the site of Super Bowls IV, VI, and IX; while the Louisiana Superdome previously hosted XII, XV, and XX.

Originally, the selection was to be voted on during the May 23–25, 1984 meetings. However, after balloting for XXI took more than two hours, voting for XXIV was rescheduled to the following year. Twelve cities were part of the bidding process, which was scheduled to award two Super Bowls (XXIII and XXIV). The bidding cities included: Anaheim, Detroit, Houston, Jacksonville, Miami, Minneapolis, New Orleans, Philadelphia, San Francisco, Seattle, Tampa, and Tempe. New Orleans entered as the favorite.

=== Teams ===
==== San Francisco 49ers ====
The 49ers entered the game seeking to win their second straight Super Bowl. Bill Walsh retired as head coach after San Francisco's 20–16 win over the Cincinnati Bengals in the previous year's Super Bowl, but rookie head coach George Seifert did not miss a beat, as he guided the 49ers to a league-best 14–2 regular season record. Their two losses were only by a combined margin of 5 points.

The 49ers' offense was just as dominating as it was during the previous regular season. Quarterback Joe Montana threw for 3,512 yards, 26 touchdowns, and only 8 interceptions, giving him what was then the highest single-season quarterback rating in NFL history (112.4). Montana also rushed for 227 yards and 3 touchdowns, and earned both the NFL Most Valuable Player Award and the NFL Offensive Player of the Year Award. Wide receiver Jerry Rice had another outstanding season, catching 82 passes for 1,483 yards and 17 touchdowns. Running back Roger Craig was the team's leading rusher with 1,054 yards and 6 touchdowns, and he recorded 49 receptions for 473 yards and another touchdown.

But other stars on the 49ers' offense began to emerge, enabling the team to spread the ball around. After being used primarily as a punt returner during his first two seasons, wide receiver John Taylor had a breakout season, catching 60 passes for 1,077 yards and 10 touchdowns, while also returning 36 punts for 417 yards. Tight end Brent Jones recorded 40 receptions for 500 yards. Fullback Tom Rathman had the best season of his career, rushing for 305 yards and catching 73 passes for 616 yards. Kicker Mike Cofer scored 136 points while making a career-high 80.6% of his field goals. Even Montana's backup, Steve Young, had a great year, throwing for 1,001 yards and 8 touchdowns with only 3 interceptions, while also rushing for 126 yards and 2 touchdowns. With all of these weapons, San Francisco's offense led the league in total yards from scrimmage (6,268) and scoring (442 points).

The 49ers' defense allowed the third-fewest points in the NFL (253). Defensive end Pierce Holt recorded 10.5 sacks, as did linebacker Charles Haley. In addition to Haley, their linebacking corps was anchored by Keena Turner, Matt Millen, and Bill Romanowski. Future Hall of Fame safety Ronnie Lott led the team with 5 interceptions. Defensive backs Eric Wright and Chet Brooks also combined for 5 interceptions between them.

==== Denver Broncos ====
The Broncos were trying to avoid becoming the second team, after the Vikings, to lose a fourth Super Bowl. After appearing in Super Bowl XXI and Super Bowl XXII, the team missed the playoffs with an 8–8 record during the 1988 season. But they signed several new players in the offseason to help them win 10 of their first 12 games in 1989 and finish with an 11–5 record.

One of Denver's new major additions was rookie running back Bobby Humphrey, who rushed for 1,151 yards, caught 22 passes for 156 yards, and scored 8 touchdowns. Humphrey gave the Broncos a powerful running attack that they lacked in their previous Super Bowl seasons. Also new to the team was rookie kicker David Treadwell, who made the Pro Bowl with an 81.8% field goal percentage and ranked third in the NFL with 120 points. The defense, coordinated by Wade Phillips, had a new weapon as well: rookie free safety Steve Atwater. Together with veteran defensive backs Dennis Smith, Wymon Henderson, and Tyrone Braxton, the Broncos' secondary combined for 14 interceptions. Braxton led the team with 6, which he returned for 103 yards and a touchdown, while also recovering 2 fumbles. Linebacker Simon Fletcher lead the team with 105 tackles and 12 sacks, while veteran linebacker Karl Mecklenburg gained 7.5 sacks, 2 forced fumbles, and four fumble recoveries. Another new addition was defensive end Ron Holmes, who recorded 9 sacks. Defensive end Alphonso Carreker added 5.5 sacks.

Veteran receiver Vance Johnson had the best season of his career, catching 76 passes for 1,095 yards and 7 touchdowns, while also returning 12 punts for 118 yards. However, quarterback John Elway played inconsistently during the regular season, throwing just as many interceptions as touchdowns (18) and recording only a 73.7 passer rating.

=== Playoffs ===
Despite his regular season problems, Elway ended up playing his best during the playoffs. First, he led the Broncos on a late touchdown drive to narrowly defeat the Pittsburgh Steelers, 24–23. The Steelers held a 17–10 halftime lead before Elway's 37-yard touchdown pass to Vance Johnson tied the game in the third quarter. Then after Pittsburgh scored two field goals to take a 23–17 fourth-quarter lead, Elway led the Broncos on a 71-yard drive to score on Melvin Bratton's 1-yard, game-winning touchdown run. On the ensuing drive, Randy Robbins then recovered a Steelers fumble on third down with 2:02 left to clinch the victory.

The Broncos then defeated the Cleveland Browns 37–21 in the AFC Championship Game. This was the third time in the last four years that both teams faced each other for the AFC Championship, and the previous two resulted in two of the most famous games in NFL Lore: The Drive and The Fumble. In this game, the Broncos seemed to be in complete control at first, building up a 24–7 lead. But Browns quarterback Bernie Kosar rallied his team back with two third-quarter touchdowns, cutting the lead to 24–21 going into the 4th quarter. Some observers began to wonder if this game would become known as "The Comeback". However, Elway destroyed any chance of a Browns comeback by leading the Broncos 80 yards and scoring with a 39-yard touchdown pass to Sammy Winder on the first drive of the 4th quarter. Denver then scored field goals on each of their next two drives to put the game away. Elway finished the game with 385 passing yards, 3 touchdowns, and no interceptions, while also leading Denver in rushing with 5 carries for 39 yards.

Meanwhile, the 49ers started out their postseason by blowing out the Minnesota Vikings, 41–13. Minnesota started out the game by marching 70 yards on their opening drive and scoring a field goal to take a 3–0 lead. But the 49ers dominated the rest of the game. On their first play from scrimmage, Montana completed a short pass to Rice, who then took it all the way to the end zone for a 72-yard touchdown reception. The next time they had the ball, Montana led them on another touchdown drive, scoring on a short pass to tight end Brent Jones. Then defensive back Chet Brooks intercepted a pass from Vikings quarterback Wade Wilson and returned it 28 yards, setting up Montana's third touchdown pass on an 8-yard toss to Taylor. Then just before halftime, Montana threw another touchdown pass to Rice, giving the 49ers a 28–3 halftime lead. Then in the fourth quarter, San Francisco scored two more touchdowns to put the game away: a 53-yard interception return by Lott and a 4-yard run by Craig. Montana finished the game with 241 passing yards, 4 touchdowns, and no interceptions. Wilson was held to just 9 completions for 74 yards, and was intercepted twice.

The 49ers then entered the NFC Championship Game against the Los Angeles Rams, who had defeated San Francisco in one of their two regular season games against them, and were coming off postseason wins against two of the NFC's toughest teams, the New York Giants and the Philadelphia Eagles. The Rams scored first to take a 3–0 lead. However, the 49ers took over in the 2nd quarter, scoring 21 unanswered points on two touchdown passes by Montana and a touchdown run by Craig. By halftime, San Francisco had a commanding 21–3 lead and went on to a surprisingly easy 30–3 win and their second consecutive Super Bowl appearance. Montana had another superb performance, compiling 262 passing yards and 2 touchdowns, again without throwing an interception. Rams quarterback Jim Everett was held to 163 yards and threw 3 interceptions.

=== Super Bowl pregame news ===
Although Elway's performance in the AFC Championship Game was widely considered his best ever, many sports writers and fans believed that the Broncos' best effort would not be good enough to beat the 49ers. After all, Denver had barely defeated the Steelers, who only had a 9–7 regular season record, while the 9–6–1 Cleveland Browns had almost overcome a 17-point second half deficit before Denver put them away in the fourth quarter. Furthermore, the Elway-led Broncos had already lost two Super Bowls. On the other hand, the Montana-led 49ers, with their powerful offense, had already won three Super Bowls.

Montana came into this game with a 7–0 record as a starting quarterback at the Superdome due to the 49ers' dominance of their then-NFC West rival New Orleans Saints. The 49ers' only loss in the Superdome in the 1980s came in 1986, when Mike Moroski started for an injured Montana.

The Broncos, as the designated home team in the annual rotation between AFC and NFC teams, wore their home orange uniforms with white pants. At the time, the Broncos were winless (0–2) in Super Bowls while wearing orange. The 49ers would wear white road uniforms with gold pants, which was the same combination they wore in their Super Bowl XVI victory.

== Broadcasting ==
The game was broadcast in the United States by CBS and featured the broadcast team of play-by-play announcer Pat Summerall and color commentator John Madden. Brent Musburger hosted all of The Super Bowl Today pregame (2 hours), halftime, and postgame events with help from his NFL Today co-hosts Irv Cross, Dick Butkus, and Will McDonough, along with game analysts Terry Bradshaw, Ken Stabler, and Dan Fouts, and then-Chicago Bears head coach Mike Ditka. Pat O'Brien, meanwhile, was stationed in San Francisco 49ers quarterback Joe Montana's hometown of Monongahela, Pennsylvania. Also contributing to the broadcast coverage were Lesley Visser; a satirical piece on instant replay by Sports Illustrated writer Curry Kirkpatrick, Bernard Goldberg of CBS' 48 Hours and a feature segment of behind-the-scenes video recorded by Denver Broncos receiver Mark Jackson showing the Broncos' preparation for the Super Bowl.

This was the last NFL broadcast for the NFL Today team as it was constructed. Several weeks after the Super Bowl, a management change at CBS resulted in the firing of Brent Musburger; his last event for the network was the call of the 1990 NCAA Men's Basketball Championship Game on April 2. Irv Cross was taken off the studio team and became an analyst instead, serving in that role for two years with Tim Ryan. Dick Butkus returned to acting, while Will McDonough moved over to NBC’s pregame, where he would remain until retiring. CBS went to a two-man studio team for 1990 with Greg Gumbel, who joined CBS from ESPN the prior year, replacing Musburger as host and Terry Bradshaw moving from his prior position as the No. 2 analyst alongside Verne Lundquist to the studio analyst position vacated by Cross. CBS would not return to using a four-man studio team until 1998, coinciding with their return to broadcasting NFL games for the first time since 1993.

CBS debuted a new graphical package and theme song for their telecasts. The graphics became part of The NFL Today open while the theme continued to be used on game broadcasts for the next two seasons and replaced the original NFL Today theme ("Horizontal Hold" by Jack Trombey), which had been used in remixed form for the 1989 season. The last use of the actual theme was for the 1991 season's NFC Championship Game, while a remixed version was used for Super Bowl XXVI's pregame show.

This was the last Super Bowl to feature a kickoff time earlier than 6 p.m. ET.

The series premiere of Grand Slam was the Super Bowl lead-out program on CBS.

The game drew a national Nielsen rating of 39.0 for CBS, the lowest rating for a Super Bowl game since Super Bowl III in January 1969.

Nissan aired a commercial during Super Bowl XXIV advertising the new Nissan 300ZX Twin Turbo. Executives at Nissan pulled the commercial after the initial airing when they became concerned the commercial would promote street racing since the commercial features the 300ZX being faster than a sport bike, a formula one car and a fighter jet.

On radio, the game was broadcast in the United States by CBS and featured the broadcast team of play-by-play announcer Jack Buck and color commentators Hank Stram and Randy Cross. Cross filled in for Stram when the latter was stricken with laryngitis and had to leave the broadcast in the third quarter of the game. Dick Stockton hosted all of the events. Locally, Super Bowl XXIV was broadcast by KGO-AM in San Francisco with Joe Starkey and Wayne Walker and by KOA-AM in Denver with Larry Zimmer and Jim Turner (Zimmer was moved from his normal position as a color commentator when the Broncos' regular play-by-play voice, Bob Martin, became seriously ill the day before the game; eventually losing his battle with cancer just under a month after the game).

This game was featured on NFL's Greatest Games under the title Coronation.

== Entertainment ==
=== Pregame ceremonies ===
The pregame show was a salute to Mardi Gras and featured musician and singer David Clayton-Thomas.

Soul and R&B singer (and New Orleans native) Aaron Neville later sang the national anthem.

The coin toss ceremony featured the recent inductees to the Pro Football Hall of Fame: defensive back Mel Blount, quarterback Terry Bradshaw, offensive lineman Art Shell, and safety Willie Wood. Shell, who was then the head coach of the Los Angeles Raiders, became the first active head coach or player to join the coin toss ceremonies. Bradshaw, not to be outdone, joined the ceremonies on the occasion of the 15th anniversary of Super Bowl IX, which had been played at Tulane Stadium and saw the Pittsburgh Steelers win their first world championship.

=== Halftime show ===
The halftime show was a salute to both New Orleans and the 40th anniversary of the comic strip Peanuts. The show featured performances by clarinetist Pete Fountain, fiddle player Doug Kershaw, and singer Irma Thomas – all Louisiana natives. Three local college bands, Southern University, University of Louisiana at Lafayette, and Nicholls State, joined in the performance. The finale featured a float that was dressed up as a riverboat that rose several stories high. The float was so huge that one of the goal posts had to be moved so it could be put on the field.

== Game summary ==
The 49ers blew out the Broncos by gaining 461 yards of total offense, holding the ball for 39:31, and scoring on eight of their first 11 drives. The San Francisco defense also limited the Broncos to 167 yards, 12 first downs, and 20:29 time of possession, while recording six sacks and forcing four turnovers. The 49ers converted all of the turnovers into touchdowns, needing only four plays total to score on the last three.

=== First quarter ===
On their opening possession, the Broncos were forced to punt after a three-and-out, and the 49ers scored on their ensuing drive, marching 66 yards in 10 plays and scoring on a 20-yard touchdown pass from quarterback Joe Montana to wide receiver Jerry Rice.

The Broncos responded with a 49-yard drive, mainly on plays by running back Bobby Humphrey, who rushed 4 times for 22 yards and caught a 27-yard shovel pass, quarterback John Elway's longest completion of the game. The drive stalled at the San Francisco 25-yard line, forcing Denver to settle for kicker David Treadwell's 42-yard field goal to cut their deficit to 7–3.

Denver's defense forced a three-and-out on San Francisco's next possession, and wide receiver Vance Johnson gave his team good field position with a 7-yard return to the Broncos' 49-yard line. But on the first play of the drive, Humphrey fumbled the ball while being tackled by defensive end Kevin Fagan, and safety Chet Brooks recovered the loose ball for San Francisco at the 49ers' 46-yard line. At this point, the 49ers completely took over the game.

On the first play after the turnover, a 14-yard run by fullback Tom Rathman was nullified by a holding penalty on center Jesse Sapolu, but Montana erased that penalty with a 20-yard pass to Rice. Four plays later, Rathman picked up a first down with a 4-yard run on 4th-and-1. The 49ers then reached the Broncos 10 on a 22-yard reception by Rice and scored on Montana's 7-yard touchdown pass to tight end Brent Jones two plays later. Kicker Mike Cofer missed the extra point attempt wide right, keeping the score at 13–3, but it turned out to be the only miscue the 49ers would make for the entire game.

=== Second quarter ===
Once again, the Broncos were forced to punt three plays after the ensuing kickoff to start the second quarter, and the 49ers advanced 69 yards in 14 plays to score another touchdown. The key player on that drive was Rathman, who caught 3 passes for 39 yards, kept the drive alive with another successful 4th-and-1 conversion, and capped it off with a 1-yard touchdown run two plays later to increase the San Francisco lead to 20–3. After the next three possessions ended in punts, with under two minutes left in the first half, 49ers wide receiver John Taylor's 17-yard punt return gave San Francisco the ball at their own 41. In just 5 plays and over a minute, they scored their fourth touchdown of the game on a 38-yard completion from Montana to Rice, increasing their lead to 27–3 to end the half.

=== Third quarter ===
When the second half started, the 49ers picked up right where they left off. After Denver forced San Francisco to punt to start the half, 49ers linebacker Michael Walter intercepted Elway's first pass of the half, and Montana threw a 28-yard touchdown pass to Rice on the next play, increasing the lead to 34–3. It was Montana's 10th Super Bowl touchdown pass breaking the previous record of 9 set by Terry Bradshaw. Then Elway was intercepted again on the Broncos' ensuing drive, this time by Brooks, who returned the ball 38 yards to the Denver 37-yard line. The turnover led to yet another San Francisco score. Two plays later, Montana fooled safety Steve Atwater with a pump fake in Rice's direction, and then threw a 35-yard touchdown pass to Taylor (his 5th and final touchdown of the game and his 11th and final touchdown pass of his Super Bowl career), making the score 41–3 just over 5 minutes into the quarter. San Francisco had scored three touchdowns in less than 6 minutes to blow open the game.

Denver's lone touchdown came on their next possession, a 61-yard, 5-play drive. First, Broncos safety Darren Carrington returned the ensuing kickoff from his own goal line to the 39-yard line. Elway's 13-yard completion to Johnson, a 34-yard run by Humphrey, and a pass interference penalty on 49ers linebacker Bill Romanowski moved the ball to the San Francisco 1-yard line. Two plays later, Elway capped off the drive with a 3-yard touchdown run, cutting their deficit to 41–10.

=== Fourth quarter ===
However, the 49ers continued to dominate the Broncos. San Francisco responded to Denver's score with an 11-play, 75-yard drive that took 6:56 off the clock. The drive included two runs and a reception by running back Roger Craig for a total of 26 yards, two runs by Rathman for a total of 22 yards, and a 12-yard reception by Rice. On the first play of the fourth quarter, Rathman finished the drive with a 3-yard touchdown run, giving the 49ers a 48–10 lead. Then after the ensuing kickoff, Elway was sacked for a 6-yard loss by defensive end Danny Stubbs. After an offsides penalty on linebacker Antonio Goss, cornerback Don Griffin strip-sacked Elway, and Stubbs returned the fumble 15 yards to Denver's 1-yard line before he was tackled by running back Steve Sewell and center Keith Kartz. Craig then closed out the scoring with the 49ers' eighth and final touchdown of the game, a 1-yard run, on the next play to make the final score of the game 55–10 in favor of San Francisco. The 49ers scored two touchdowns in this quarter before two minutes had elapsed.

San Francisco, now comfortable with their lead, but still with nearly an entire quarter left to play, had Steve Young fill in for Montana for the remainder of the game. After the next three possessions resulted in punts, the 49ers reached the Broncos 30 to end the game.

Rice finished the game with 7 receptions for 148 yards and a Super Bowl record 3 receiving touchdowns. He joined Craig as the only players to score three touchdowns in a Super Bowl (Craig did it in Super Bowl XIX – 2 receiving and 1 rushing). Craig was the leading rusher of the game with 69 rushing yards and a touchdown, while also catching 5 passes for 34 yards. Rathman rushed for 38 yards and 2 touchdowns while also catching 4 passes for 43 yards. Taylor caught 3 passes for 49 yards and a touchdown and added another 38 yards on 3 punt returns. Elway was held to a passer rating of 19.4 on just 10 completions out of 26 attempts for 108 yards with no touchdowns and 2 interceptions. He managed to run for a touchdown, but fumbled twice (although he recovered one of them). Humphrey was Denver's leading rusher and receiver, with 61 rushing yards and 3 receptions for 38 yards. Carrington returned 6 kickoffs for 146 yards.

A photo essay titled "Ranking the Super Bowls", written by media analyst Elliot Harrison and featuring Dallas personnel man Gil Brandt, ranked Super Bowl XXIV the lowest of the first 50 played. The article was published on the NFL's website.

=== Box score ===
Super Bowl XXIV: San Francisco 49ers 55, Denver Broncos 10

Quarter	1	2	3	4	Total
49ers (NFC)	13	14	14	14	55
Broncos (AFC)	3	0	7	0	10

at Louisiana Superdome, New Orleans, Louisiana

- Date: January 28, 1990
- Game time: 4:23 p.m. CST
- Game weather: 72 °F (22 °C), played indoors, domed stadium

Scoring summary

Quarter	Time	Drive			Team	Scoring information	Score	
Quarter	Time	Plays	Yards	TOP	Team	Scoring information	SF	DEN
1	10:06	10	66	3:59	SF	Jerry Rice 20-yard touchdown reception from Joe Montana, Mike Cofer kick good	7	0
1	6:47	10	49	3:19	DEN	42-yard field goal by David Treadwell	7	3
1	0:03	10	54	5:15	SF	Brent Jones 7-yard touchdown reception from Montana, Cofer kick no good (wide right)	13	3
2	7:15	14	69	7:07	SF	Tom Rathman 1-yard touchdown run, Cofer kick good	20	3
2	0:34	5	59	1:04	SF	Rice 38-yard touchdown reception from Montana, Cofer kick good	27	3
3	12:48	1	28	0:06	SF	Rice 28-yard touchdown reception from Montana, Cofer kick good	34	3
3	9:44	2	37	0:48	SF	John Taylor 35-yard touchdown reception from Montana, Cofer kick good	41	3
3	6:53	5	61	2:51	DEN	John Elway 3-yard touchdown run, Treadwell kick good	41	10
4	14:57	11	75	6:56	SF	Rathman 3-yard touchdown run, Cofer kick good	48	10
4	13:47	1	1	0:04	SF	Roger Craig 1-yard touchdown run, Cofer kick good	55	10
"TOP" = time of possession. For other American football terms, see Glossary of American football.							55	10

== Aftermath ==
Montana and the 49ers looked to win a third consecutive Super Bowl in 1990 and once again finished with the league's best record at 14–2. However, in the NFC Championship Game that season, the 49ers were defeated by the New York Giants on a field goal as time expired. During the game, Montana was sacked from his blind side by Leonard Marshall and was forced to leave the game with a series of injuries including a broken finger, a bruised back, and a concussion. Later, it was discovered that Montana suffered an injury to his throwing elbow in the game and it was severe enough to cost him the entire 1991 season. Montana's injuries, which kept him out of fifteen games in 1992 as well, paved the way for Steve Young to become the 49ers' starting quarterback full-time and Montana was eventually traded to the Kansas City Chiefs in 1993. Young would win the 49ers another Super Bowl title in 1995 in Super Bowl XXIX.

After Super Bowl XXIV, Elway and the Broncos entered a period of decline. 1990 saw them fall to 5–11, which put them last in the AFC West. While they returned to the playoffs in 1991, the Broncos failed to make the Super Bowl after losing the AFC Championship Game to the Buffalo Bills. That marked the first time in their existence that Denver lost a conference championship game. They eventually returned to success as Elway led the team to an NFL-best 13–3 record in 1996, only to lose their first playoff game, against the Jacksonville Jaguars. Incidentally, that was the final time in Elway's career that he would lose a playoff game. After his three previous attempts had gone unsuccessfully, Elway led the Broncos to Super Bowl XXXII where they finally broke through and won the Super Bowl for the first time in franchise history, over the Green Bay Packers. A year later, in what later proved to be the final game of his career, Elway led the Broncos to another victory in the Super Bowl as Denver won Super Bowl XXXIII 34–19 over the Atlanta Falcons and was named the game's Most Valuable Player.

Montana, Young and Elway would meet again in the player introduction and coin toss ceremonies at Super Bowl 50 in Santa Clara, California. Elway and Terrell Davis were named honorary captains for the Broncos, while Young presented the ceremonial coin for the game. Montana flipped the coin while Elway called the toss on behalf of the then-current captains of the Broncos and Carolina Panthers. The Broncos went on to win their third world championship, 24–10.

== Final statistics ==
Sources: NFL.com Super Bowl XXIV, Super Bowl XXIV Play Finder SF, Super Bowl XXIV Play Finder Den

=== Statistical comparison ===
	San Francisco 49ers	Denver Broncos
First downs	28	12
First downs rushing	14	5
First downs passing	14	6
First downs penalty	0	1
Third down efficiency	8/15	3/11
Fourth down efficiency	2/2	0/0
Net yards rushing	144	64
Rushing attempts	44	17
Yards per rush	3.3	3.8
Passing – Completions/attempts	24/32	11/29
Times sacked-total yards	1–0	6–33
Interceptions thrown	0	2
Net yards passing	317	103
Total net yards	461	167
Punt returns-total yards	3–38	2–11
Kickoff returns-total yards	3–49	9–196
Interceptions-total return yards	2–42	0–0
Punts-average yardage	4–39.5	6–38.5
Fumbles-lost	0–0	3–2
Penalties-total yards	4–38	0–0
Time of possession	39:31	20:29
Turnovers	0	4

=== Individual statistics ===
49ers passing
	C/ATT^{1}	Yds	TD	INT	Rating
Joe Montana	22/29	297	5	0	147.6
Steve Young	2/3	20	0	0	85.4
49ers rushing
	Car^{2}	Yds	TD	LG^{3}	Yds/Car
Roger Craig	20	69	1	18	3.45
Tom Rathman	11	38	2	18	3.45
Joe Montana	2	15	0	10	7.50
Terrence Flagler	6	14	0	10	2.33
Steve Young	4	6	0	11	1.50
Harry Sydney	1	2	0	2	2.00
49ers receiving
	Rec^{4}	Yds	TD	LG^{3}	Target^{5}
Jerry Rice	7	148	3	38	9
Roger Craig	5	34	0	12	6
Tom Rathman	4	43	0	18	4
John Taylor	3	49	1	35	5
Mike Sherrard	1	13	0	13	1
Wesley Walls	1	9	0	9	2
Brent Jones	1	7	1	7	2
Harry Sydney	1	7	0	7	1
Jamie Williams	1	7	0	7	1
Mike Wilson	0	0	0	0	1

Broncos passing
	C/ATT^{1}	Yds	TD	INT	Rating
John Elway	10/26	108	0	2	19.4
Gary Kubiak	1/3	28	0	0	68.8
Broncos rushing
	Car^{2}	Yds	TD	LG^{3}	Yds/Car
Bobby Humphrey	12	61	0	34	5.08
John Elway	4	8	1	3	2.00
Sammy Winder	1	–5	0	–5	–5.00
Broncos receiving
	Rec^{4}	Yds	TD	LG^{3}	Target^{5}
Bobby Humphrey	3	38	0	27	4
Steve Sewell	2	22	0	12	2
Vance Johnson	2	21	0	13	3
Ricky Nattiel	1	28	0	28	2
Mel Bratton	1	14	0	14	1
Sammy Winder	1	7	0	7	1
Clarence Kay	1	6	0	6	2
Mark Jackson	0	0	0	0	8
Mike Young	0	0	0	0	3
Orson Mobley	0	0	0	0	1

^{1}Completions/attempts ^{2}Carries ^{3}Long gain ^{4}Receptions ^{5}Times targeted

=== Records set ===
The following records were set in Super Bowl XXIV, according to the official NFL.com boxscore, the 2022 NFL Record & Fact Book and the ProFootball reference.com game summary.
Some records have to meet NFL minimum number of attempts to be recognized. The minimums are shown (in parentheses).

Player records set
Passing records
Most attempts, career	122	Joe Montana (San Francisco)
Most completions, career	83	Joe Montana (San Francisco)
Most consecutive completions, game	13	Joe Montana (San Francisco)
Most passing yards, career	1,142 yards	Joe Montana (San Francisco)
Most touchdown passes, game	5	Joe Montana (San Francisco)
Most touchdown passes, career	11	Joe Montana (San Francisco)
Highest passer rating, career, (40 attempts)	127.8	Joe Montana (San Francisco)
Highest completion percentage, career, (40 attempts)	68.0% (83–122)	Joe Montana (San Francisco)
Receiving records
Most receptions, career	20	Roger Craig (San Francisco)
Most receiving touchdowns, game	3	Jerry Rice (San Francisco)
Most receiving touchdowns, career	4	Jerry Rice (San Francisco)
Special Teams
Most kickoff returns, career	10	Ken Bell (Denver)
Most punt return yards gained, career	94 yards	John Taylor (San Francisco)
Highest average, punt return yardage, career (4 returns)	15.7 yards (6–94)	John Taylor (San Francisco)
Most (one point) extra points, game	7	Mike Cofer (San Francisco)
Most (one point) extra points, career	9	Mike Cofer (San Francisco)
Records tied
Most touchdowns, game	3	Jerry Rice (San Francisco)
Most points scored, game	18	Jerry Rice (San Francisco)
Most touchdowns, career	4	Jerry Rice; Roger Craig (San Francisco)
Most points scored, career	24	Jerry Rice; Roger Craig (San Francisco)
Lowest percentage, passes had intercepted, career, (40 attempts)	0% (0–122)	Joe Montana (San Francisco)
Most rushing touchdowns, game	2	Tom Rathman (San Francisco)
Most fumbles recovered, career	2	John Elway (Denver)
Most punt returns, career	6	John Taylor (San Francisco)

Team records set
Most points, game	55 points	49ers
Largest margin of victory	45 points	49ers
Most touchdowns, game	8	49ers
Most (one point) PATs	7	49ers
Most passing touchdowns	5	49ers
Most kickoff returns, game	9	Broncos
Records tied
Most Super Bowl victories	4	49ers
Most consecutive Super Bowl victories	2	49ers
Most points, fourth quarter	14 points	49ers
Fewest turnovers, game	0	49ers
Most Super Bowl losses	4	Broncos
Fewest passing touchdowns	0	Broncos
Fewest penalties	0	Broncos

Turnovers are defined as the number of times losing the ball on interceptions and fumbles.

Records set, both team totals
	Total	49ers	Broncos
Kickoff returns, Both Teams
Most kickoff returns	12	3	9
Records tied, both team totals
Most touchdowns	9	8	1
Most points, third quarter	21 points	14	7
Fewest field goals attempted	1	0	1
Most rushing touchdowns	4	3	1

This is also the first and only NFL game to end with a final score of 55–10, which is scorigami.

== Starting lineups ==
Hall of Fame‡

San Francisco	Position	Position	Denver
Offense
John Taylor	WR		Vance Johnson
Bubba Paris	LT		Gerald Perry
Guy McIntyre	LG		Jim Juriga
Jesse Sapolu	C		Keith Kartz
Bruce Collie	RG		Doug Widell
Harris Barton	RT		Ken Lanier
Brent Jones	TE		Orson Mobley
Jerry Rice‡	WR		Mark Jackson
Joe Montana‡	QB		John Elway‡
Roger Craig‡	RB		Steve Sewell
Tom Rathman	RB		Bobby Humphrey
Defense
Pierce Holt	LE		Alphonso Carreker
Michael Carter	NT		Greg Kragen
Kevin Fagan	RE		Ron Holmes
Charles Haley‡	LOLB		Michael Brooks
Matt Millen	LILB		Rick Dennison
Michael Walter	RILB		Karl Mecklenburg
Keena Turner	ROLB		Simon Fletcher
Darryl Pollard	LCB		Tyrone Braxton
Don Griffin	RCB		Wymon Henderson
Chet Brooks	SS		Dennis Smith
Ronnie Lott‡	FS		Steve Atwater‡

== Officials ==
- Referee: Dick Jorgensen #60 first Super Bowl; alternate for XV
- Umpire: Hendi Ancich #115 alternate for XXI
- Head linesman: Earnie Frantz #111 first Super Bowl
- Line judge: Ron Blum #83 first Super Bowl
- Back judge: Al Jury #106 third Super Bowl (XX, XXII)
- Side judge: Gerald Austin #34 first Super Bowl
- Field judge: Don Orr #77 second Super Bowl (XVII)
- Alternate referee: Dick Hantak #105 worked Super Bowl XVII as back judge
- Alternate umpire: Rex Stuart #103
- This would be the final game for Jorgensen, who died from cancer on October 10, 1990. Austin was promoted to fill his vacant referee position.
