= Tyrone Braxton =

American football player (born 1964)

No. 34
- Position: Safety

Personal information
- Born: December 17, 1964 (age 61); Madison, Wisconsin, U.S.
- Listed height: 5 ft 11 in (1.80 m)
- Listed weight: 190 lb (86 kg)

Career information
- High school: James Madison Memorial (Madison)
- College: North Dakota State
- NFL draft: 1987: 12th round, 334th overall pick

Career history
- Denver Broncos (1987–1993); Miami Dolphins (1994); Denver Broncos (1995–1999)

Awards and highlights
- 2× Super Bowl champion (XXXII, XXXIII); Pro Bowl (1996); NFL interceptions co-leader (1996)

Career NFL statistics
- Interceptions: 36
- Interception yards: 617
- Touchdowns: 4
- Stats at Pro Football Reference

Tyrone Scott Braxton (born December 17, 1964) is an American former professional football player who was a safety in the National Football League (NFL) from 1987 to 1999, primarily for the Denver Broncos. Braxton played in four Super Bowls with the Broncos, and won two NFL championship rings in Super Bowl XXXII and Super Bowl XXXIII. Braxton also played one season with the Miami Dolphins in 1994 and was a one time Pro Bowler in 1996, a season in which he led the NFL in interceptions with nine.

== Early life and college ==
Braxton attended James Madison Memorial High School in Madison, Wisconsin. He played college football at North Dakota State University where he earned all-conference honors as a senior and was drafted by the Broncos in the 12th round of the 1987 NFL draft, the second to last pick overall. He has a Master of Social Work from Metropolitan State University of Denver.

== Professional career ==
=== Denver Broncos ===
The Denver Broncos selected Braxton in the 12th round (334th overall) of the 1987 NFL draft. He was the 14th and final safety drafted in 1987.

==== 1987 season ====
Throughout training camp, Braxton competed for a roster spot as a backup safety and special teams player. On September 2, 1987, the Denver Broncos officially placed Braxton on injured reserve after he suffered a shoulder injury during a preseason game. On December 19, 1987, Braxton made his professional regular season debut as the Broncos defeated the Kansas City Chiefs 20—17. He appeared in the last two games of the regular season primarily as a special teams player.

The Denver Broncos finished the 1987 NFL season first in the AFC West with a 10—4—1 record, clinching a playoff berth and earning a first round bye and a playoff berth. On January 10, 1988, Braxton made his playoff debut in the AFC Divisional Round and recorded three solo tackles as the Broncos routed the Houston Oilers 34—10. On January 31, 1988, Braxton appeared in Super Bowl XXII with the Denver Broncos as they were soundly defeated by the Washington Redskins 10—42.

==== 1988 season ====
He entered training camp slated to remain as a backup at safety under defensive coordinator Joe Collier. Head coach Dan Reeves named him the primary nickelback and a backup at safety to begin the season, behind starting safeties Dennis Smith and Mike Harden. On September 4, 1988, Braxton recorded three solo tackles and made the first sack of his career on Dave Krieg for a seven—yard loss as the Broncos lost their home-opener to the Seattle Seahawks 21—14. In Week 7, he set a season-high with four solo tackles during a 30—14 win against the Atlanta Falcons. On October 23, 1988, Braxton recorded three solo tackles, made one pass deflection, and had his first career interception on a pass attempt by Todd Blackledge during a 21—39 loss at the Pittsburgh Steelers. He finished the season with 49 combined tackles (38 solo), seven pass deflections, two interceptions, a fumble recovery, and a sack 16 games and zero starts.

==== 1989 season ====
On July 18, 1989, the Denver Broncos re-signed Braxton to a three—year, $561,000 contract. The Broncos' defensive backs coach Charlie Waters transitioned Braxton from safety to cornerback during training camp. He was transitioned to cornerback following the departure of starting cornerback Jeremiah Castille and the selection of safety Steve Atwater in the first round of the 1989 NFL draft. He competed for a starting role at cornerback against Mike Harden and Wymon Henderson. Head coach Dan Reeves named Braxton a starting cornerback to begin the regular season, pairing him with Wymon Henderson and Mark Haynes at nickelback.

On September 10, 1989, Braxton earned his first career start in the Broncos' home-opener against the Kansas City Chiefs and made six combined tackles (four solo), one pass deflection, and intercepted a pass thrown by Steve DeBerg and returned it 34—yards for the first touchdown of his career as they won 20—34. On October 22, 1989, he set a season-high with 11 combined tackles (10 solo), set another season-high with four pass deflections, made one fumble recovery, and intercepted a pass by Dave Kreig during a 24—21 win at the Seattle Seahawks. He started all 16 games for the first time in his career and finished the season with 111 combined tackles (77 solo), 18 pass deflections, six interceptions, two forced fumbles, two fumble recoveries, and a touchdown.

The Denver Broncos finished the 1989 NFL season first in the AFC West with an 11—5 record, clinching a playoff berth and earning a first round bye. The Broncos advanced to the Super Bowl after defeating the Pittsburgh Steelers 24—23 in the Divisional Round and the Cleveland Browns 37—21 in the AFC Championship Game. On January 23, 1990, Braxton started in Super Bowl XXIV and recorded eight solo tackles, two pass deflections, and one sack as the Broncos were soundly defeated 10—55 by the San Francisco 49ers. He was tasked with covering Hall of Famer Jerry Rice who made seven receptions for 148 receiving yards and caught three touchdown receptions.

==== 1990 season ====
The Denver Broncos selected Alton Montgomery in the second round (52nd overall) of the 1990 NFL draft and transitioned him to cornerback. Head coach Dan Reeves retained Braxton and Wymon Henderson as the starting cornerbacks to begin the regular season. In Week 2, he set a season-high with six solo tackles and two pass deflections during a 24—23 win against the Kansas City Chiefs. On September 23, 1990, Braxton made one solo tackle before he exited the game due to a knee injury as the Broncos lost 34—31 to the Seattle Seahawks. On September 26, 1990, the Broncos placed Braxton on injured reserve for the remainder of the season due to a torn ligament in his right knee requiring surgery.

==== 1991 season ====
On July 9, 1991, the Denver Broncos re-signed Braxton to a three—year, $540,000 contract extension. He returned to training camp after recovering from a torn MCL and regained his role as a starting cornerback.

On September 1, 1991, Braxton started in the Broncos' home-opener against the Cincinnati Bengals and made two combined tackles (one solo) and intercepted a pass by Boomer Esiason and returned it for a 52—yard touchdown as they won 14—45. In Week 8, he set a season-high with eight combined tackles (seven solo) as the Broncos defeated the Kansas City Chiefs 19—16.He finished the 1991 NFL season with 92 combined tackles (57 solo), 12 pass deflections, four interceptions, a forced fumble, a fumble recovery, a sack, and one touchdown in 16 games and 15 starts.

==== 1992 season ====
Head coach Dan Reeves retained Braxton and Wymon Henderson as the starting cornerbacks. On September 6, 1992, Braxton started in the Denver Broncos' home-opener against the Los Angeles Raiders and set a season-high with seven combined tackles (four solo) as they won 17—13. The following week, Braxton recorded five combined tackles (three solo) and set a season-high with four pass deflections during a 21—13 win against the San Diego Chargers in Week 2. He started in all 16 games throughout the 1993 NFL season and made 99 combined tackles (56 solo) and two interceptions. He led the team with 16 pass deflections. On December 28, 1992, the Broncos announced their decision to fire head coach Dan Reeves after they finished with an 8—8 record.

==== 1993 season ====
On January 26, 1993, the Denver Broncos announced their decision to hire defensive coordinator Wade Phillips to be their new head coach. Defensive coordinator Charlie Waters retained Braxton as a starting cornerback and paired him with Charles Dimry.

On September 5, 1993, Braxton started in the Broncos' season-opener at the New York Jets and made nine combined tackles (seven solo), one pass deflection, two forced fumbles, and had an interception on a pass thrown by Boomer Esiason during a 26—20 victory. In Week 18, he set a season-high with nine combined tackles (eight solo) during a 30—33 overtime loss at the Los Angeles Raiders. He started in all 16 games throughout the season and made 111 combined tackles (79 solo), 19 pass deflections, three interceptions, two forced fumbles, and two fumble recoveries.

==== 1994 season ====
On February 18, 1994, the Denver Broncos officially released Braxton after they finished the 1993 NFL season with a 9—7 record. He was released after the 1993 season, after being blamed a "scapegoat" behind for a Broncos defense that struggled. The team would finish last in total defense in 1994, the year he was away from the team.

=== Miami Dolphins ===
On May 13, 1994, the Miami Dolphins signed Braxton to a two—year, $900,000 contract as an unrestricted free agent. Head coach Don Shula named Braxton the starting nickelback and listed him as the third cornerback on the depth chart behind starting tandem Troy Vincent and J. B. Brown. On November 6, 1994, Braxton set a season-high with three solo tackles, made one pass deflection, and had his first interception as a member of the Dolphins after picking off a pass by Jim Harbaugh during a 21—22 win against the Indianapolis Colts. He finished the 1994 NFL season with 12 combined tackles (10 solo), four pass deflections, and two interceptions in 16 games and zero starts.

==== 1995 season ====
On April 19, 1995, the Miami Dolphins released Braxton with one season remaining on his contract.

=== Denver Broncos (second stint) ===
On July 23, 1995, the Denver Broncos signed Braxton as an unrestricted free agent. Upon his return, Braxton was transitioned from cornerback to safety and began competing against Ronnie Bradford and Tim Hauck for the starting role at strong safety after it was vacated following the retirement of Dennis Smith. Although defensive coordinator Greg Robinson held reservations on the acquisition of Braxton, head coach Mike Shanahan believed Braxton would successfully earn the starting role and named him the starting strong safety to begin the regular season, pairing him with starting free safety Steve Atwater.

In Week 2, Braxton set a season-high with ten combined tackles (eight solo) during a 21—31 loss at the Dallas Cowboys. In Week 8, he recorded seven combined tackles (five solo) and set a season-high with three pass deflections as the Broncos lost 7—21 to the Kansas City Chiefs. He started all 16 games at strong safety and made 110 combined tackles (74 solo), ten pass deflections, and two interceptions.

==== 1996 season ====
Head coach Mike Shanahan retained Braxton and Steve Atwater as the starting safeties during the 1996 NFL season. On September 15, 1996, Braxton made five combined tackles (four solo) and intercepted a pass by Trent Dilfer attempted to throw to tight end Dave Moore and returned it for a 69—yard touchdown as the Broncos defeated the Tampa Bay Buccaneers 23—27. On October 20, 1996, Braxton made seven combined tackles (six solo), two pass deflections, and secured the Broncos' 34—45 victory against the Baltimore Ravens by intercepting Vinny Testaverde's pass attempt to tight end Brian Kinchen with 1:48 remaining. On November 10, 1996, Braxton recorded six combined tackles (five solo), set a season-high with four pass deflections, recovered a fumble, and intercepted a pass by Dave Kreig during a 12—17 victory against the Chicago Bears. On December 15, 1996, Braxton made five solo tackles, a pass deflection, a forced fumble, and set a career-high with his ninth interception of the season after picking off Jeff Hostetler's pass to James Jett as the Broncos defeated the Oakland Raiders 19—24. He started all 16 games and finished with a total of 84 combined tackles (69 solo), 18 pass deflections, three forced fumbles, one fumble recovery, and a touchdown. His nine interceptions tied with St. Louis Rams safety Keith Lyle for the league lead in 1996. His performance throughout the season earned him a selection to the 1997 Pro Bowl, marking the first and only Pro Bowl selection of his career.

==== 1997 season ====
Head coach Mike Shanahan retained the starting safety duo of Braxton and Steve Atwater throughout the season and owned one of the top pass defenses with the additions of cornerbacks Tim McKyer and Darrien Gordon. In Week 2, he set a season-high 11 combined tackles (six solo) during a 35—14 win at the Seattle Seahawks. On November 9, 1997, Braxton made three solo tackles, two pass deflections, and intercepted a pass by Kerry Collins and returned it 27—yards for a touchdown as the Broncos routed the Carolina Panthers 34—0. In Week 14, he recorded four solo tackles, set a season-high with three pass deflections, and intercepted a pass attempt by Craig Whelihan during a 38—28 win at the San Diego Chargers. He started in all 16 games and finished with 79 combined tackles (61 solo), 12 pass deflections, four interceptions, three fumble recoveries, a forced fumble, a touchdown, and was credited with half a sack.

The Denver Broncos finished the 1997 NFL season second in the AFC West with a 12—4 record to earn a Wild-Card position. The Broncos routed the Jacksonville Jaguars 42—17 in the AFC Wild-Card Game and won the AFC Divisional Round 14—10 at the Kansas City Chiefs. On January 11, 1998, Braxton recorded eight combined tackles (three solo), led the team with three pass deflections, and intercepted Kordell Stewart's pass attempt to wide receiver Charles Johnson during a 24—21 victory at the Pittsburgh Steelers in the AFC Championship Game to advance to the Super Bowl. On January 25, 1998, Braxton started in Super Bowl XXXII and recorded seven combined tackles (six solo), made one pass deflection, and intercepted a pass Brett Favre attempted to throw to wide receiver Robert Brooks as the Broncos defeated the Green Bay Packers 24—31. He earned his first Super Bowl ring with the Broncos in 1997.

==== 1998 season ====
Throughout training camp, Braxton competed to retain his role as the starting strong safety after the Broncos selected safety Eric Brown in the second round (51st overall) of the 1998 NFL draft. Head coach Mike Shanahan named Braxton the starting nickelback and the primary backup safety behind starting tandem Steve Atwater and rookie Eric Brown. In Week 12, he set a season-high with five solo tackles, made one pass deflection, and intercepted a pass attempt by Donald Hollas as the Broncos routed the Oakland Raiders 40—14. He finished the season with 39 combined tackles (33 solo), five pass deflections, and one interception in 16 games and six starts.

The Denver Broncos finished the 1998 NFL season atop the AFC West with a 14—2 record to clinch a playoff berth and a first round bye. On January 9, 1999, Braxton recorded seven combined tackles (six solo) as the Broncos routed the Miami Dolphins 38—3 in the Divisional Round. The following week, the Broncos defeated the New York Jets 23—10 to win the AFC Championship Game. On January 31, 1999, Braxton started in Super Bowl XXXIII at strong safety and recorded two combined tackles (one solo) and had a fumble recovery as the Broncos defeated the Atlanta Falcons 34—19.

== Personal life ==
His brother was convicted in a drug charge and served one year in a Wisconsin state prison back in the 1980s. A second brother served a 25-year prison sentence for armed robbery, while more of his friends were either arrested or died because of drug related issues, which inspired a career for Braxton in the youth ministry.
