= Jake McCullough =

American football player (born 1965)

No. 96
- Position: Defensive end

Personal information
- Born: July 22, 1965 (age 61); Loris, South Carolina, U.S.
- Listed height: 6 ft 7 in (2.01 m)
- Listed weight: 345 lb (156 kg)

Career information
- High school: Loris
- College: Clemson
- NFL draft: 1989: 4th round, 97th overall pick

Career history
- Denver Broncos (1989–1990); Indianapolis Colts (1991)*; London Monarchs (1992)
- * Offseason or practice squad member only

Career NFL statistics
- Games played: 16
- Stats at Pro Football Reference

Richard Charles "Jake" McCullough (born July 22, 1965) is an American former professional football player who was a defensive end for the Denver Broncos of the National Football League (NFL) and the London Monarchs of the WLAF. He played college football for the Clemson Tigers.

== College football career ==
McCullough played football for the Clemson Tigers from 1985 to 1988. With the Tigers, he played in the 1986 Gator Bowl and the 1988 and 1989 Citrus Bowl. He made second-team All-Atlantic Coast and honorable mention All-America by the Associated Press.

== Professional career ==
=== Denver Broncos ===
==== 1989 season ====
McCullough was selected by the Denver Broncos in the fourth round of the 1989 NFL draft, with the 97th pick overall. He played in 10 games in the Broncos' 1989 season before suffering a hip injury and being placed on injured reserve on December 15. In his 10 games, he recorded two tackles and a sack.

The Broncos later went on to Super Bowl XXIV, but lost 55–10 against the San Francisco 49ers.

==== 1990 season ====
McCullough played six games with the team in 1990.

=== London Monarchs ===
McCullough played with the London Monarchs of the World League of American Football in 1992.
