= Ron Holmes =

American football player (1963–2011)

No. 90
- Position: Defensive end

Personal information
- Born: August 26, 1963; Fort Benning, Georgia, U.S.
- Died: October 27, 2011 (aged 48); Dupont, Washington, U.S.
- Listed height: 6 ft 5 in (1.96 m)
- Listed weight: 255 lb (116 kg)

Career information
- High school: Timberline (Lacey, Washington)
- College: Washington
- NFL draft: 1985: 1st round, 8th overall pick

Career history
- Tampa Bay Buccaneers (1985–1988); Denver Broncos (1989–1992)

Awards and highlights
- Consensus All-American (1984); Morris Trophy (1984); 2× First-team All-Pac-10 (1983, 1984)

Career NFL statistics
- Games played: 101
- Sacks: 36.5
- Fumble recoveries: 5
- Stats at Pro Football Reference

Ronald Holmes (August 26, 1963 – October 27, 2011) was an American professional football player who was a defensive end for eight seasons in the National Football League (NFL) for the Tampa Bay Buccaneers and the Denver Broncos.

Holmes played college football for the Washington Huskies in Seattle, winning the Pac-10 Morris Trophy and earning All-American honors in 1984. After leading the Huskies to a victory over Oklahoma in the Orange Bowl, Holmes left the school with the all team record in career sacks (28) and sacks in a game (5). Holmes was selected in the first round with the eighth overall pick in the 1985 NFL draft by Tampa Bay. He spent four years with the Bucs before moving on to Denver in 1989 and playing four seasons for the Broncos.

Holmes ranked second on the Broncos in 1989 with 9 sacks and started in Super Bowl XXIV. He was considered to have Pro Bowl talent, but his development was slowed by injuries.

Holmes was inducted into the UW Husky Hall of Fame in 2001. At age 48, he died in 2011 in Dupont, Washington.

== See also ==
- Washington Huskies football statistical leaders
