= 1996 Denver Broncos season =

American football team season

- Owner: Pat Bowlen
- General manager: John Beake and Mike Shanahan
- President: Pat Bowlen
- Head coach: Mike Shanahan
- Offensive coordinator: Gary Kubiak
- Defensive coordinator: Greg Robinson
- Home stadium: Mile High Stadium

Results
- Record: 13–3
- Division place: 1st AFC West
- Playoffs: Lost Divisional Playoffs (vs. Jaguars) 27–30
- All-Pros: 5: RB Terrell Davis (1st team); TE Shannon Sharpe (1st team); T Gary Zimmerman (1st team); DE Alfred Williams (1st team); QB John Elway (2nd team)
- Pro Bowlers: 9: QB John Elway; RB Terrell Davis; TE Shannon Sharpe; T Gary Zimmerman; DE Alfred Williams; DT Michael Perry; OLB Bill Romanowski; FS Steve Atwater; SS Tyrone Braxton
- Team MVP: Terrell Davis

Uniform
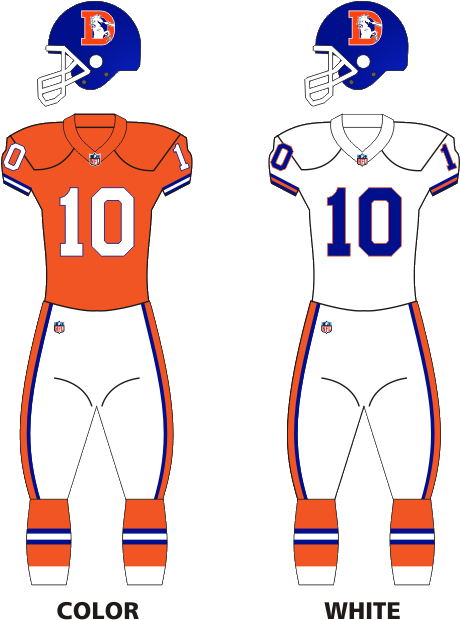

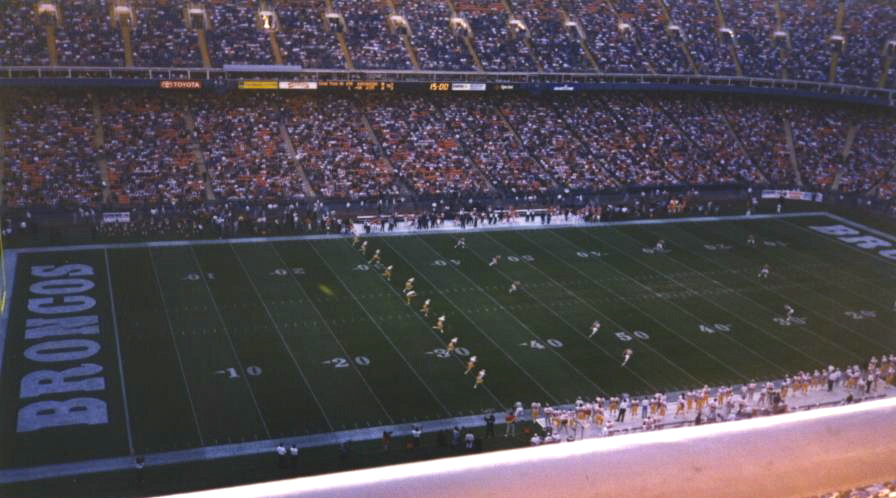
Denver vs. Tampa Bay at Mile High Stadium, September 15, 1996

The 1996 Denver Broncos season was the franchise's 27th season in the National Football League, the 37th overall and their 2nd under head coach Mike Shanahan. The Broncos improved on their 8–8 record from 1995 and finished the season with a 13–3 record. They also clinched the AFC West for the first time since 1991, and earning the top seed in the AFC Playoffs.

In the playoffs, the Broncos were upset by the Jacksonville Jaguars in the Divisional Round, 30–27. Prior to their defeat, they were the top-seeded team in the NFL and were heavily favored to go to and win the Super Bowl by many analysts, breaking the AFC losing streak from the 1980s. The loss rendered the 1996 Broncos team as a historic failure, as it was a major Super Bowl or bust year. After the season, Jumpy Geathers retired.

== Offseason ==
=== NFL draft ===
1996 Denver Broncos draft
Round	Pick	Player	Position	College	Notes
1	15	John Mobley	Linebacker	Kutztown	
2	44	Tory James *	Defensive back	LSU	
3	65	Detron Smith	Running back	Texas A&M	
3	78	Mark Campbell	Defensive tackle	Florida	
4	100	Jeff Lewis	Quarterback	Northern Arizona	
4	122	Darrius Johnson	Defensive back	Oklahoma	
5	159	Patrick Jeffers	Wide receiver	Virginia	
6	181	Tony Veland	Defensive back	Nebraska	
7	213	Leslie Ratliffe	Offensive tackle	Tennessee	
7	226	Chris Banks	Guard	Kansas	
7	235	L. T. Levine	Running back	Kansas	
7	236	Brian Gragert	Punter	Wyoming	
Made roster * Made at least one Pro Bowl during career

== Personnel ==
=== Staff ===
1996 Denver Broncos staff
Front office: President and Chief Executive Officer – Pat Bowlen; General Manager – John Beake; Director of Player Personnel – Neal Dahlen; Director of Pro Scouting – Jack Elway; Director of College Scouting – Ted Sundquist; College Scouting Consultant – Jerry Frei; Administrative Assistant/Player Personnel – Harold Richardson; Administrative Assistant/Defense – J. D. Brookhart; College Scout – Dave Gettleman; Head coaches: Head Coach – Mike Shanahan; Assistant Head Coach/Offensive Line – Alex Gibbs; Offensive coaches: Offensive Coordinator/Quarterbacks – Gary Kubiak; Running Backs – Bobby Turner; Wide Receivers – Mike Heimerdinger; Tight Ends – Brian Pariani; Assistant Offensive Line – Barney Chavous; Offensive Assistant – Rick Dennison	Defensive coaches: Defensive Coordinator – Greg Robinson; Defensive Line – George Dyer; Linebackers – Frank Bush; Defensive Backs/Secondary – Ed Donatell; Defensive Assistant – Rick Smith; Special teams coaches: Special Teams – Richard Smith; Strength and conditioning: Strength and Conditioning – Rich Tuten; Assistant Strength and Conditioning – Greg Saporta; Strength Assistant – Barney Chavous

=== Roster ===
1996 Denver Broncos roster
Quarterbacks (QB): 7 John Elway; 8 Jeff Lewis; 14 Bill Musgrave; Running backs (RB): 29 Aaron Craver FB; 30 Terrell Davis; 22 Vaughn Hebron KR; 38 Reggie Rivers; 42 Detron Smith FB; Wide receivers (WR): 82 Patrick Jeffers; 81 Todd Kinchen PR; 87 Ed McCaffrey; 83 Anthony Miller; 88 Mike Sherrard; 80 Rod Smith PR; Tight ends (TE): 89 Dwayne Carswell; 86 Byron Chamberlain; 84 Shannon Sharpe	Offensive linemen (OL): 70 Jamie Brown T; 63 David Diaz-Infante G; 75 Brian Habib G; 68 Reggie McElroy T; 66 Tom Nalen C; 69 Mark Schlereth G; 64 Ralph Tamm G/C; 76 Broderick Thompson T; 65 Gary Zimmerman T; Defensive linemen (DL): 67 Mark Campbell DT; 79 Jumpy Geathers DT; 96 Harald Hasselbach DE; 72 Ernest Jones DE/DT; 97 Mike Lodish DT; 95 Michael Dean Perry DT; 94 Jeff Robinson; 98 Maa Tanuvasa DT; 91 Alfred Williams DE; 90 Dan Williams DE	Linebackers (LB): 57 Allen Aldridge MLB; 56 Keith Burns MLB; 59 Glenn Cadrez OLB; 54 Britt Hager OLB; 51 John Mobley OLB; 53 Bill Romanowski OLB; Defensive backs (DB): 27 Steve Atwater FS; 34 Tyrone Braxton SS; 39 Ray Crockett CB; 37 Tim Hauck FS; 21 Randy Hilliard CB; 20 Tory James CB; 25 Darrius Johnson CB; 31 Rondell Jones SS; 48 Lionel Washington CB; Special teams (ST): 1 Jason Elam K; 16 Tom Rouen P	Practice squad: -- Reggie Green G; 60 John Jones G; -- Marcus Price T; 41 Michael Titley TE; 32 Tony Veland S; Reserve: 77 Jason Childs T (PUP); -- Steve Russ LB (Military); Rookies in italics 53 active, 2 reserve, 5 practice squad

== Regular season ==
Week	Date	Opponent	Result	Record	Venue	Attendance	Recap
1	September 1	New York Jets	**W** 31–6	1–0	Mile High Stadium	70,595	Recap
2	September 8	at **Seattle Seahawks**	**W** 30–20	2–0	Kingdome	43,671	Recap
3	September 15	Tampa Bay Buccaneers	**W** 27–23	3–0	Mile High Stadium	71,535	Recap
4	September 22	at **Kansas City Chiefs**	**L** 14–17	3–1	Arrowhead Stadium	79,439	Recap
5	September 29	at Cincinnati Bengals	**W** 14–10	4–1	Cinergy Field	51,798	Recap
6	October 6	**San Diego Chargers**	**W** 28–17	5–1	Mile High Stadium	75,058	Recap
7	Bye						
8	October 20	Baltimore Ravens	**W** 45–34	6–1	Mile High Stadium	70,453	Recap
9	October 27	**Kansas City Chiefs**	**W** 34–7	7–1	Mile High Stadium	75,652	Recap
10	November 4	at **Oakland Raiders**	**W** 22–21	8–1	Oakland–Alameda County Coliseum	61,179	Recap
11	November 10	Chicago Bears	**W** 17–12	9–1	Mile High Stadium	75,555	Recap
12	November 17	at New England Patriots	**W** 34–8	10–1	Foxboro Stadium	59,457	Recap
13	November 24	at Minnesota Vikings	**W** 21–17	11–1	Hubert H. Humphrey Metrodome	59,142	Recap
14	December 1	**Seattle Seahawks**	**W** 34–7	12–1	Mile High Stadium	74,982	Recap
15	December 8	at Green Bay Packers	**L** 6–41	12–2	Lambeau Field	60,712	Recap
16	December 15	**Oakland Raiders**	**W** 24–19	13–2	Mile High Stadium	75,466	Recap
17	December 22	at **San Diego Chargers**	**L** 10–16	13–3	Jack Murphy Stadium	46,801	Recap
Note: Intra-division opponents are in **bold** text.

== Standings ==
AFC West
	W	L	T	PCT	PF	PA	STK
^{(1)} Denver Broncos	13	3	0	.813	391	275	L1
Kansas City Chiefs	9	7	0	.563	297	300	L3
San Diego Chargers	8	8	0	.500	310	376	W1
Oakland Raiders	7	9	0	.438	340	293	L2
Seattle Seahawks	7	9	0	.438	317	376	W1

== Postseason ==
=== Schedule ===
Round	Date	Opponent (seed)	Result	Record	Venue	Attendance	Recap
Wild Card	First-round bye						
Divisional	January 4, 1997	Jacksonville Jaguars (5)	L 27–30	0–1	Mile High Stadium	75,678	Recap

=== AFC Divisional Playoffs: vs (5) Jacksonville Jaguars ===
AFC Divisional Playoffs: (5) Jacksonville Jaguars at (1) Denver Broncos – Game summary

Quarter	1	2	3	4	Total
Jaguars	0	13	7	10	30
Broncos	12	0	0	15	27

at Mile High Stadium, Denver, CO

- Date: January 4, 1997
- Game time: 2:00 p.m. (Mountain Time)
- Game weather: 36 °F (2 °C), sunny
- Game attendance: 75,678

== Awards and records ==
AP Offensive Player of the Year – Terrell Davis

UPI AFL-AFC Offensive MVP – Terrell Davis (1996 was the last year this award was given out)

Terrell Davis set franchise rushing record for most carries (345) in a season and most rushing touchdowns (13) in a season

=== Milestones ===
Terrell Davis reached 1,000 yards faster than any Denver Bronco running back in franchise history
