= Doug Widell =

American football player (born 1966)

No. 64, 67, 74
- Position: Guard

Personal information
- Born: September 23, 1966 (age 60); Hartford, Connecticut, U.S.
- Listed height: 6 ft 4 in (1.93 m)
- Listed weight: 289 lb (131 kg)

Career information
- High school: South Catholic (Hartford)
- College: Boston College
- NFL draft: 1989: 2nd round, 41st overall pick

Career history
- Denver Broncos (1989–1992); Green Bay Packers (1993); Detroit Lions (1994–1995); Indianapolis Colts (1996–1997); Green Bay Packers (1998)*
- * Offseason or practice squad member only

Awards and highlights
- First-team All-East (1988)

Career NFL statistics
- Games played: 139
- Games started: 126
- Fumble recoveries: 4
- Stats at Pro Football Reference

Douglas Joseph Widell (born September 23, 1966) is an American former professional football player who was a guard for nine seasons in the National Football League (NFL). He played college football for the Boston College Eagles and was selected by the Denver Broncos in the second round of the 1989 NFL draft. He was a part of the Broncos' Super Bowl XXIV losing team. His brother Dave Widell was his teammate at Boston College and with the Broncos.

Pre-draft measurables
Height	Weight	Bench press
6 ft 4 1/4 in (1.94 m)	283 lb (128 kg)	25 reps
