= Steve Sewell =

American football player (born 1963)

No. 30
- Positions: Running back, wide receiver

Personal information
- Born: April 2, 1963 (age 63); San Francisco, California, U.S.
- Listed height: 6 ft 3 in (1.91 m)
- Listed weight: 210 lb (95 kg)

Career information
- High school: Archbishop Riordan (San Francisco, California)
- College: Oklahoma
- NFL draft: 1985: 1st round, 26th overall pick

Career history
- Denver Broncos (1985–1991)

Awards and highlights
- Second-team All-Big Eight (1984)

Career NFL statistics
- Rushing yards: 917
- Rushing average: 4
- Receptions: 187
- Receiving yards: 2,354
- Total touchdowns: 26
- Stats at Pro Football Reference

Steven Edward Sewell (born April 2, 1963) is an American former professional football player who was a running back for the Denver Broncos of the National Football League (NFL). He played college football for the Oklahoma Sooners. Sewell was selected by the Broncos in the first round of the 1985 NFL draft. He played his entire NFL career for the Broncos from 1985 to 1991, making Super Bowl appearances in Super Bowl XXI, XXII and XXIV. Sewell finished his seven seasons with 917 rushing yards, 187 receptions for 2,354 yards, and 26 total touchdowns. Sewell became the head football coach at Overland High School in Aurora, Colorado.

In 1988 Sewell had his first son and in 1999 Sewell had fraternal twins. He and his family live in Centennial, Colorado.

== Early life ==
Sewell attended Riordan High School in San Francisco, California and was a student and a letterman in football. Steve played three years of Varsity Football at Archbishop Riordan High School under Coach Dan Hayes, where he gained 1723 yards rushing in his career. In his senior year, he gained 1041 yards rushing and scored 10 TDs rushing as he led Riordan to an 8 win and 2 loss season.

== College career ==
Sewell played in 47 games in his four years with the Oklahoma Sooners rushing for 1178 yards and 10 touchdowns on 187 carries (6.3 avg) and also had 560 yards receiving and 4 touchdowns on 33 receptions (17.0 avg). During his senior season Sewell had 295 all-purpose yards in a 24–6 victory over conference opponent Kansas State; at the time it was the third highest single game total by a Sooner.

== NFL career statistics ==
Legend
**Bold**	Career high

=== Regular season ===
Year	Team	Games		Rushing					Receiving				
Year	Team	GP	GS	Att	Yds	Avg	Lng	TD	Rec	Yds	Avg	Lng	TD
1985	DEN	16	2	**81**	**275**	3.4	16	**4**	24	224	9.3	54	1
1986	DEN	11	2	23	123	5.3	15	1	23	294	12.8	40	1
1987	DEN	7	0	19	83	4.4	17	2	13	209	16.1	**72**	1
1988	DEN	16	3	32	135	4.2	**26**	1	**38**	**507**	13.3	68	**5**
1989	DEN	16	3	7	44	**6.3**	10	0	25	416	**16.6**	56	3
1990	DEN	12	1	17	46	2.7	8	3	26	268	10.3	36	0
1991	DEN	16	1	50	211	4.2	**26**	2	**38**	436	11.5	60	2
		94	12	229	917	4.0	26	13	187	2,354	12.6	72	13

=== Playoffs ===
Year	Team	Games		Rushing					Receiving				
Year	Team	GP	GS	Att	Yds	Avg	Lng	TD	Rec	Yds	Avg	Lng	TD
1986	DEN	3	0	6	13	2.2	12	0	8	100	12.5	39	0
1987	DEN	3	1	7	7	1.0	5	**1**	8	92	11.5	25	0
1989	DEN	3	1	5	23	4.6	12	0	5	77	**15.4**	**43**	0
1991	DEN	2	0	**8**	**51**	**6.4**	**19**	0	**10**	**106**	10.6	26	0
		11	2	26	94	3.6	19	1	31	375	12.1	43	0
