= Jeff Alexander (American football) =

American football player (born 1965)

No. 20, 40
- Positions: Running back, fullback

Personal information
- Born: January 15, 1965 (age 61); Baton Rouge, Louisiana, U.S.
- Listed height: 6 ft 0 in (1.83 m)
- Listed weight: 232 lb (105 kg)

Career information
- High school: Baker (LA)
- College: Tulane; Southern
- NFL draft: 1988: undrafted

Career history
- Denver Broncos (1988–1989); Dallas Texans (1991); Phoenix Cardinals (1991)*; London Monarchs (1992); Denver Broncos (1992)
- * Offseason or practice squad member only

Awards and highlights
- World Bowl champion (I)

Career NFL statistics
- Rushing yards: 146
- Rushing average: 3.2
- Receptions: 8
- Receiving yards: 84
- Total touchdowns: 2
- Stats at Pro Football Reference

Career AFL statistics
- Receptions: 2
- Receiving yards: 13
- Stats at ArenaFan.com

Jeffrey O'Neal Alexander (born January 15, 1965) is an American former professional football player who was a running back in the National Football League (NFL). He was signed as an undrafted free agent by the Denver Broncos in 1988. He played for the Broncos in 1988 and 1992. He played college football for the Southern Jaguars.

Alexander also played for the London Monarchs of the World League of American Football (WLAF) and the Dallas Texans of the Arena Football League (AFL).
