= Darrell Hamilton =

American football player (born 1965)

No. 69
- Position: Offensive tackle

Personal information
- Born: May 11, 1965 (age 61); Washington, D.C., U.S.
- Listed height: 6 ft 6 in (1.98 m)
- Listed weight: 298 lb (135 kg)

Career information
- High school: Anacostia (Washington, D.C.)
- College: North Carolina
- NFL draft: 1989: 3rd round, 69th overall pick

Career history
- Denver Broncos (1989–1991); Atlanta Falcons (1992)*; New York Giants (1993)*; San Diego Chargers (1993)
- * Offseason or practice squad member only

Career NFL statistics
- Games played: 21
- Games started: 10
- Stats at Pro Football Reference

Darrell Franklin Hamilton (born May 11, 1965) is an American former professional football player who was a tackle in the National Football League (NFL). He played for the Denver Broncos from 1990 to 1991. He was selected in the third round of the 1989 NFL draft by the Broncos.
