= Monte Smith =

American football player (born 1967)

No. 65
- Position: Guard

Personal information
- Born: April 24, 1967 (age 59); Madison, Wisconsin, U.S.
- Listed height: 6 ft 5 in (1.96 m)
- Listed weight: 270 lb (122 kg)

Career information
- High school: Oregon (Oregon, Wisconsin)
- College: North Dakota
- NFL draft: 1989: 9th round, 236th overall pick

Career history
- Denver Broncos (1989–1990)

Career NFL statistics
- Games played: 14
- Stats at Pro Football Reference

Monte Gene Smith (born April 24, 1967) is an American former professional football player who was a guard for the Denver Broncos of the National Football League (NFL). He played college football for the North Dakota Fighting Hawks and was selected by the Broncos in the ninth round of the 1989 NFL draft with the 236th overall pick. He played the 1989 season with the team. After a year away from the NFL, he was again a member of the team during the 1991 NFL season, but did not see any playing time in a regular season game.
