= Gerald Perry (American football) =

American football player (born 1964)

No. 60, 64, 71
- Positions: Tackle, guard

Personal information
- Born: November 12, 1964 (age 61); Columbia, South Carolina, U.S.
- Listed height: 6 ft 6 in (1.98 m)
- Listed weight: 290 lb (132 kg)

Career information
- High school: Dreher (Columbia)
- College: Southern
- NFL draft: 1988: 2nd round, 45th overall pick

Career history
- Denver Broncos (1988–1990); Los Angeles Rams (1991–1992); Los Angeles/Oakland Raiders (1993–1995); St. Louis Rams (1996)*; (1997)*
- * Offseason or practice squad member only

Career NFL statistics
- Games played: 97
- Games started: 84
- Fumble recoveries: 2
- Stats at Pro Football Reference

Gerald Perry (born November 12, 1964) is an American former professional football player who was an offensive tackle for eight seasons in the National Football League (NFL). He played college football for the Southern Jaguars and was selected by the Denver Broncos in the second round of the 1988 NFL draft. He started in Super Bowl XXIV for the Broncos. He was a star basketball player in high school, winning the honor of the state's Mr. Basketball in 1983 as a center for Dreher High School.

On December 27, 1989, Perry was convicted of soliciting a prostitute, and was sentenced to 15 days imprisonment. He was injured in a shooting in 2009.
