= Steve Atwater =

American football player (born 1966)

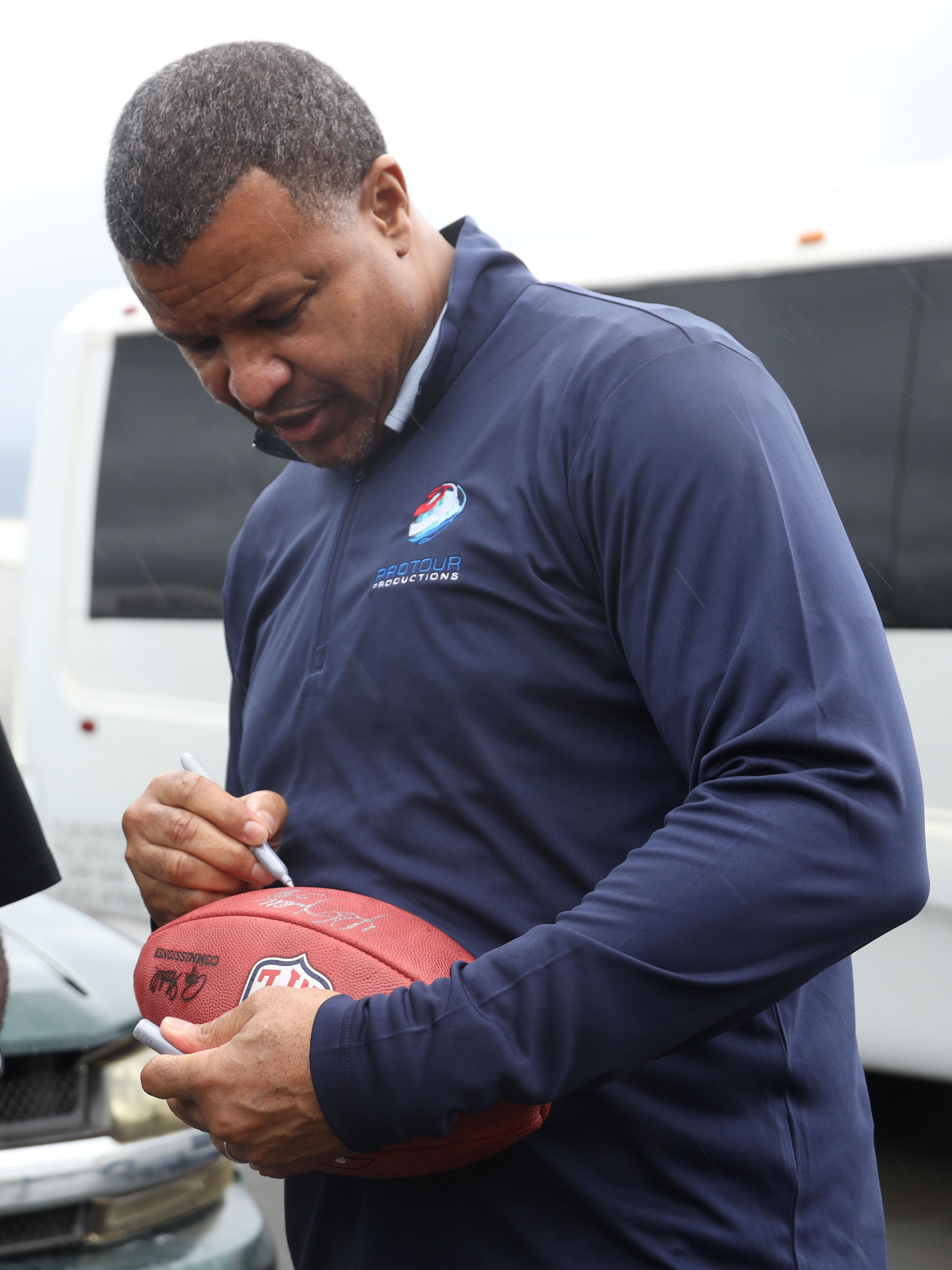
- Atwater in 2025

No. 27
- Position: Safety

Personal information
- Born: October 28, 1966 (age 60); Chicago, Illinois, U.S.
- Listed height: 6 ft 3 in (1.91 m)
- Listed weight: 218 lb (99 kg)

Career information
- High school: Lutheran North (St. Louis, Missouri)
- College: Arkansas (1985–1988)
- NFL draft: 1989: 1st round, 20th overall pick

Career history
- Denver Broncos (1989–1998); New York Jets (1999)

Awards and highlights
- 2× Super Bowl champion (XXXII, XXXIII); 2× First-team All-Pro (1991, 1992); 2× Second-team All-Pro (1990, 1996); 8× Pro Bowl (1990–1996, 1998); NFL 1990s All-Decade Team; PFWA All-Rookie Team (1989); Denver Broncos Ring of Fame; 2× First-team All-SWC (1986, 1988); Second-team All-SWC (1987)

Career NFL statistics
- Total tackles: 1,188
- Interceptions: 24
- Interception yards: 408
- Forced fumbles: 6
- Fumble recoveries: 8
- Sacks: 5
- Defensive touchdowns: 1
- Stats at Pro Football Reference
- Pro Football Hall of Fame

Stephen Dennis Atwater (born October 28, 1966) is an American former professional football player who was a safety for the Denver Broncos of the National Football League (NFL). He was an eight-time Pro Bowl selection and two-time Super Bowl champion. Atwater was elected to the Pro Football Hall of Fame on February 1, 2020.

Atwater and Dennis Smith made up a Broncos secondary that was known for their ferocious hits on opposing players.

== Early life ==
Atwater attended Lutheran High School North in St. Louis, Missouri and was the school's top athlete, playing football, basketball, and track. Atwater was selected all-conference and league Most Valuable Player as an option style quarterback. He credits his coach there, Mike Russell, as serving as a mentor for him both as a football player and becoming an exemplary citizen. Atwater also is sixth on Lutheran North's all-time passing yards in a season with 1,097 yards in his junior year.

== College career ==
Atwater signed with the University of Arkansas, where he was moved from quarterback to safety. He was named to the All-Southwest Conference team three times and named as an All-American twice.

During his senior year, Atwater helped the 1988 Arkansas Razorbacks football team finish the season at 10-2 and win the Southwest Conference championship outright, but lost to UCLA and QB Troy Aikman in the 1989 Cotton Bowl Classic on New Year's Day. 1988 bookended his college career since Arkansas also finished 10–2 after beating Arizona State 18–17 in the 1985 Holiday Bowl during Atwater's freshman season.

Helping Atwater's stock as a pro prospect was his appearance in the East-West Shrine Game, where he logged two interceptions. He was also named defensive most valuable player in the 1989 East-West Shrine Game.

He still holds the school record with 14 interceptions in his career.

In 1994, Atwater was named to the Razorback All-Century Team and the All-Decade Team for the 1980s. He was inducted into the University of Arkansas Sports Hall of Honor in 1998.

== Professional career ==
=== Pre-draft ===
On January 15, 1989, Atwater appeared in the East-West Shrine Game and made two interceptions for the West as they were defeated 24—6 by the East. He was named the Defensive Player of the Game and substantially raised his draft stock following his performance. He was considered to be one of the top two safety prospects available in the 1989 NFL Draft, along with Florida's Louis Oliver. Atwater was considered slow after running a 4.63s 40-yard dash at the NFL Scouting Combine, compared to Louis Oliver who ran a 4.37s 40-yard dash. At Arkansas' Pro Day, Atwater improved his 40-yard dash time to 4.50. During the pre-draft process, he had pre-draft visits with multiple teams including the Broncos.

Pre-draft measurables
Height	Weight	40-yard dash	10-yard split	20-yard split	20-yard shuttle	Vertical jump	Broad jump	Bench press
6 ft 3 1/2 in (1.92 m)	212 lb (96 kg)	4.63 s	1.60 s	2.75 s	4.14 s	37.5 in (0.95 m)	9 ft 6 in (2.90 m)	7 reps
All values from NFL Combine

=== Denver Broncos ===
The Denver Broncos selected Atwater in the first round (20th overall) of the 1989 NFL draft. Atwater was the first safety drafted in 1989. Head coach Dan Reeves was conflicted on which safety to draft after Louis Oliver was unexpectedly still undrafted at 20th overall. Head coach Dan Reeves consulted with defensive coordinator Wade Phillips and defensive backs coach Charlie Waters and it was decided they would draft Atwater due to his leadership and instincts.

==== 1989 season ====
Due to failed contract negotiations, Atwater staged a contract holdout which subsequently caused him to refuse to attend the first two weeks of training camp. On August 1, 1989, the Denver Broncos signed Atwater to a four—year, $2 million rookie contract that included an initial signing bonus of $750,000.

Upon his arrival at training camp, Atwater was slated to take over a starting role at safety following the departure of Mike Harden. Defensive coordinator Wade Phillips employed him to line up close to the line of scrimmage and as a strong safety in the box to fortify the Broncos' dismal run defense from the previous season. Head coach Dan Reeves named Atwater and Dennis Smith the starting safeties to begin the regular season. With both standing at 6'3", the Broncos employed possibly the tallest safety tandem of all-time.

On September 10, 1989, Atwater earned his first career start and made his professional regular season debut in the Broncos' home-opener against the Kansas City Chiefs as they won 34—20. On September 24, 1989, Atwater set a season-high with two interceptions and had his first career interception on a pass Jay Schroeder attempted to throw to wide receiver Willie Gault and returned it for a 30—yard gain in the second quarter as the Broncos defeated the Los Angeles Raiders 31—21. In Week 5, he set a season-high with 12 combined tackles during a 10—16 win against the San Diego Chargers. He started all 16 games during his rookie campaign and made 129 combined tackles (86 solo) and three interceptions.

==== 1990 season ====
The Denver Broncos' retained Atwater and Dennis Smith as the starting safeties to begin the regular season in 1990. On September 17, 1990, Atwater had a career highlight in a game against the Kansas City Chiefs that was nationally televised on Monday Night Football. As the Kansas City Chiefs' 260 lbs. running back Christian Okoye came through a hole in the line of scrimmage, he was met by Atwater early in the first quarter. The resulting collision stopped Okoye in his tracks and resulted in no gain, with Atwater standing over him, taunting the proclaimed "Nigerian Nightmare", while he lay on the ground stunned. The hit instantly became the most prominent play of their careers. His coach Mike Shanahan stated "That's the hit people will remember him for.". The Broncos went on to defeat the Chiefs 24—23. The following game, Atwater was sidelined as the Broncos defeated the Seattle Seahawks in overtime 31—34 due to an injury classified as a rib strain. In Week 6, he set a season-high with 18 combined tackles during a 17—34 loss to the Pittsburgh Steelers. On November 18, 1990, Atwater sacked Jim Harbaugh for a five—yard loss, marking the first sack of his career during a 16—13 loss to the Chicago Bears. He finished the season with a career-high 173 combined tackles (112 solo), made two pass deflections, and one sack in 15 games and 15 starts. His breakout season earned him a selection to the 1991 Pro Bowl, alongside Dennis Smith. This marked the first Pro Bowl selection of his career, although he was unable to participate due to injury.

==== 1991 season ====
On September 15, 1991, Atwater made ten combined tackles, a fumble recovery, and intercepted Jeff Kemp's pass to wide receiver Paul Skansi as the Broncos defeated the Seattle Seahawks 10—16. In Week 16, he set a season-high with 14 combined tackles and sacked Chris Chandler for a five—yard loss, marking his lone sack of the season as the Broncos defeated the Phoenix Cardinals 24—19. He started in all 16 games throughout the 1991 NFL season and finished with 150 combined tackles (83 solo), 11 pass deflections, five interceptions, and one sack. He finished with the second most tackles on the team for the second season in-a-row, behind linebacker Michael Brooks with 153 combined tackles. His performance in 1991 earned him a selection to the 1992 Pro Bowl.

==== 1992 season ====
On July 7, 1992, the Denver Broncos re-signed Atwater to a two—year, $3.50 million contract that included an initial signing bonus of $350,000. Head coach Mike Shanahan retained Atwater and Dennis Smith as the starting safety duo to begin the regular season. Atwater would be inactive as the Broncos defeated the Los Angeles Raiders in their home-opener due to an ankle sprain.

In Week 2, he set a season-high with 17 combined tackles (10 solo) during a 21—13 victory against the San Diego Chargers. On September 27, 1992, Atwater recorded five solo tackles, set a season-high with three pass deflections, and had his first interception of the season on a pass attempt by Mike Tomczak during a 12—0 win at the Cleveland Browns. In Week 15, he made seven combined tackles (six solo), a pass deflection, a fumble recovery, and intercepted a pass by Jim Kelly during a 17—27 loss at the Buffalo Bills. He finished the 1992 NFL season with 151 combined tackles (73 solo), 12 pass deflections, two interceptions, two forced fumbles, two fumble recoveries, and one sack in 15 games and 15 starts. On December 28, 1992, the Broncos announced their decision to fire head coach Dan Reeves after they finished with an 8—8 record.

==== 1993 season ====
On January 26, 1993, the Denver Broncos announced their decision to hire defensive coordinator Wade Phillips to be their new head coach. Defensive coordinator Charlie Waters retained Atwater and Dennis Smith as the starting safeties to begin the season. On September 5, 1993, Atwater started in the Broncos' season-opener at the New York Jets and recorded eight combined tackles (six solo) and set a season-high with three pass deflections in their 26—20 victory. In Week 14, Atwater set a season-high with 14 combined tackles (nine solo) and had one pass break-up during a 10—13 loss at the San Diego Chargers. He started all 16 games throughout the 1993 NFL season and led the Broncos with 141 combined tackles (80 solo). He also made 12 pass deflections, two forced fumbles, two interceptions, and one sack. He was voted to the 1994 Pro Bowl, marking his fourth consecutive Pro Bowl selection.

==== 1994 season ====
Head coach Wade Phillips retained Atwater as the starting strong safety to begin the regular season. He started alongside Darryl Hall and Rondell Jones for the first three games while Dennis Smith sat out as a contract holdout. In Week 3, Atwater set a season-high with 14 combined tackles (11 solo) and had a forced fumble as the Broncos were routed 16—48 by the Los Angeles Raiders. On October 9, 1994, Atwater made six combined tackles (two solo), a pass break-up, recovered a fumble, and had his lone interception of the season after picking off Rick Mirer during a 16—9 victory at the Seattle Seahawks. He was inactive for two games (Weeks 15—16) after injuring his hamstring. He finished the season with 125 combined tackles (72 solo), eight pass deflections, one interception, two fumble recoveries, and one forced fumble in 14 games and 14 starts. On December 30, 1994, the Denver Broncos fired head coach Wade Phillips after they finished the 1994 NFL season with a 7—9 record.

==== 1995 season ====
On February 1, 1995, the Denver Broncos announced the hiring Mike Shanahan as their new head coach after previously holding the position of offensive coordinator. On May 12, 1995, the Denver Broncos re-signed Atwater to a five—year, $12.50 million contract extension that included a signing bonus of $3.30 million. Defensive coordinator Greg Robinson retained Atwater as the starting strong safety and paired him with starting free safety Tyrone Braxton.

In Week 11, Atwater set a season-high 11 combined tackles (10 solo) during a 13—31 loss at the Philadelphia Eagles. On December 10, 1995, Atwater recorded three combined tackles (one solo), tied his season-high of three pass deflections, and intercepted a pass John Friesz threw to wide receiver Brian Blades during a 31—27 loss to the Seattle Seahawks. He started all 16 games in 1995 and finished the season with 103 combined tackles (82 solo), 13 pass deflections, three interceptions, and two forced fumbles.

==== 1996 season ====
Head coach Mike Shanahan retained the duo of Atwater and Tyrone Braxton as the starting safeties in 1996. In Week 13, he set a season-high 12 combined tackles (10 solo) during a 21—17 victory at the Minnesota Vikings. In Week 16, Atwater recorded four solo tackles, tied his season-high of two pass deflections, and intercepted a pass by Jeff Hostetler as the Broncos defeated the Oakland Raiders 24—19. He started in all 16 games throughout the 1996 NFL season and finished with 81 combined tackles (64 solo), 11 pass deflections, three interceptions, and two forced fumbles. He was voted to the 1997 Pro Bowl, marking the seventh consecutive Pro Bowl selection of his career.

==== 1997 season ====
The combination of Atwater and Tyrone Braxton returned as the starting safeties for the third consecutive season. He was sidelined for the Broncos' 38—20 victory against the Cincinnati Bengals in Week 4 due to a shoulder injury. On November 30, 1997, Atwater recorded four combined tackles (three solo), set a season-high with three pass deflections, and scored the first and only touchdown of his career during a 38—28 win at the San Diego Chargers. His scored on a pick-six in the second quarter after intercepting Craig Whelihan's pass to tight end Freddie Jones and returning it for a 22—yard touchdown. In Week 15, he set a season-high with eight combined tackles (six solo) during a 24—35 loss at the Pittsburgh Steelers. He ended the season with a total of 68 combined tackles (53 solo), seven pass deflections, two interceptions, two forced fumbles, one sack, and one touchdown in 15 games and 15 starts.

The Denver Broncos finished the 1997 NFL season second in the NFC West with a 12—4 record, clinching playoff berth. The Broncos defeated the Jacksonville Jaguars 42—17 in the AFC Wild-Card Game and the Kansas City Chiefs 14—10 in the Divisional Round. They defeated the Pittsburgh Steelers 24—21 in the AFC Championship Game to advance to the Super Bowl. On January 25, 1998, Atwater started in Super Bowl XXXII and had one of the greatest defensive performances in a Super Bowl, recording six solo tackles, one pass deflection, one sack, and a forced fumble in their 31—24 victory against the Green Bay Packers.

==== 1998 season ====
Head coach Mike Shanahan retained Atwater as the starting free safety to begin the season and paired him with rookie second round pick Eric Brown for the majority of the season. On December 21, 1998, Atwater set a season-high with eight combined tackles (five solo), made one pass deflection, and had his lone interception of the season on a pass Dan Marino attempted to throw to wide receiver O. J. McDuffie during a 21—31 loss at the Miami Dolphins. He started in all 16 games and finished the season with 55 combined tackles (43 solo), five pass deflections, and one interception. He was unexpectedly voted to the 1999 Pro Bowl. It was speculated his Pro Bowl selection was due to his performance in Super Bowl XXXII. His eight Pro Bowl selections ranks as the second most in franchise history.

The Denver Broncos finished the 1998 NFL season atop the AFC West with a 14—2 record to clinch a playoff berth and first round bye. The Broncos routed the Miami Dolphins 34—19 in the Divisional Round. On January 17, 1999, Atwater made four combined tackles (two solo), one pass deflection, and forced a fumble during a 23—10 victory against the New York Jets in the AFC Championship Game. On January 31, 1999, Atwater started in Super Bowl XXXIII and recorded seven combined tackles (six solo) and made one pass deflection as the Broncos defeated the Atlanta Falcons 34—19.

==== 1999 season ====
On March 1, 1999, the Denver Broncos released Atwater with one—year remaining on his contract due to salary cap concerns, saving $3.30 million.

Denver's defense jumped 20 spots to finish 7th against the run and tied for 3rd best in yards per carry with a 3.7-yard average. That same year, Atwater finished 2nd to the Kansas City Chiefs' Derrick Thomas in Defensive Rookie of the Year voting. The additions of rookies Atwater and Bobby Humphrey, along with key free agent signings, helped Denver rebound from 8–8 in 1988 to AFC Super Bowl representative in 1989.

=== New York Jets ===
On March 2, 1999, the New York Jets signed Atwater three—year, $8.25 million contract as an unrestricted free agent that included a signing bonus of $1.80 million. He entered training camp slated as the starting free safety under defensive coordinator Bill Belichick. Head coach Bill Parcells named Atwater and Victor Green the starting safeties to begin the regular season.

Atwater played for the New York Jets for one season and became a free agent. He called Broncos owner Pat Bowlen, asking him if he could retire as a Bronco. He signed a one-day ceremonial contract with the Broncos before announcing his retirement from football. He thanked several of his coaches, stating "I bleed orange and will always bleed orange and blue." At the time of his retirement, he played in 155 consecutive games with the Broncos. Bowlen called Atwater one of the Broncos' "greatest players".

== NFL career statistics ==
Legend
	Won the Super Bowl
**Bold**	Career high
Underline	Incomplete data

=== Regular season ===
Year	Team	Games		Tackles				Interceptions						Fumbles				
Year	Team	GP	GS	Cmb	Solo	Ast	Sck	PD	Int	Yds	Y/I	Lng	TD	FF	FR	Yds	Y/F	TD
1989	DEN	**16**	**16**	129	—	—	0.0	—	3	34	11.3	30	0	—	1	**29**	**29.0**	0
1990	DEN	15	15	**173**	—	—	**1.0**	—	2	32	16.0	27	0	**2**	0	0	—	0
1991	DEN	**16**	**16**	150	—	—	**1.0**	—	**5**	**104**	20.8	49	0	1	1	0	0.0	0
1992	DEN	15	15	151	—	—	**1.0**	—	2	22	11.0	22	0	—	**2**	1	0.5	0
1993	DEN	**16**	**16**	141	—	—	**1.0**	—	2	81	**40.5**	**68**	0	0	0	0	—	0
1994	DEN	14	14	74	52	22	0.0	—	1	24	24.0	24	0	1	**2**	17	8.5	0
1995	DEN	**16**	**16**	103	**82**	21	0.0	—	3	54	18.0	25	0	0	0	0	—	0
1996	DEN	**16**	**16**	81	64	17	0.0	—	3	11	3.7	11	0	1	0	0	—	0
1997	DEN	15	15	68	53	15	**1.0**	—	2	42	21.0	22	**1**	0	**2**	0	0.0	0
1998	DEN	**16**	**16**	55	43	12	0.0	—	1	4	4.0	4	0	0	0	0	—	0
1999	NYJ	12	11	63	40	**23**	0.0	**1**	0	0	—	0	0	1	0	0	—	0
Career		167	166	1,188	334	110	5.0	1	24	408	17.0	68	1	6	8	47	5.9	0

=== Postseason ===
Year	Team	Games		Tackles				Interceptions					
Year	Team	GP	GS	Cmb	Solo	Ast	Sck	PD	Int	Yds	Y/I	Lng	TD
1989	DEN	3	3	3	—	—	0.0	—	0	0	—	0	0
1991	DEN	2	2	0	0	0	0.0	**0**	**1**	0	**0.0**	0	0
1993	DEN	1	1	0	0	0	0.0	—	0	0	—	0	0
1996	DEN	1	1	6	6	0	0.0	—	0	0	—	0	0
1997	DEN	**4**	**4**	9	5	**4**	**1.0**	—	0	0	—	0	0
1998	DEN	3	3	**10**	**9**	1	0.0	—	0	0	—	0	0
Career		14	14	28	23	5	1.0	0	1	0	0.0	0	0

== Legacy ==
Atwater was inducted to the Broncos' Ring of Fame in 2005. In 2017, Atwater was hired as both an insider for the Broncos' website as well as fan development manager.

Atwater was among 27 modern-era semifinalists for the Pro Football Hall of Fame class of 2012. He was one of four previously eligible candidates that made it to the semifinals for the first time. Atwater also made the finalist list for the 2016 and 2020 classes.

After 16 years, Atwater was selected to the 2020 Hall of Fame class on February 1, 2020.
