= Simon Fletcher (American football) =

American football player (born 1962)

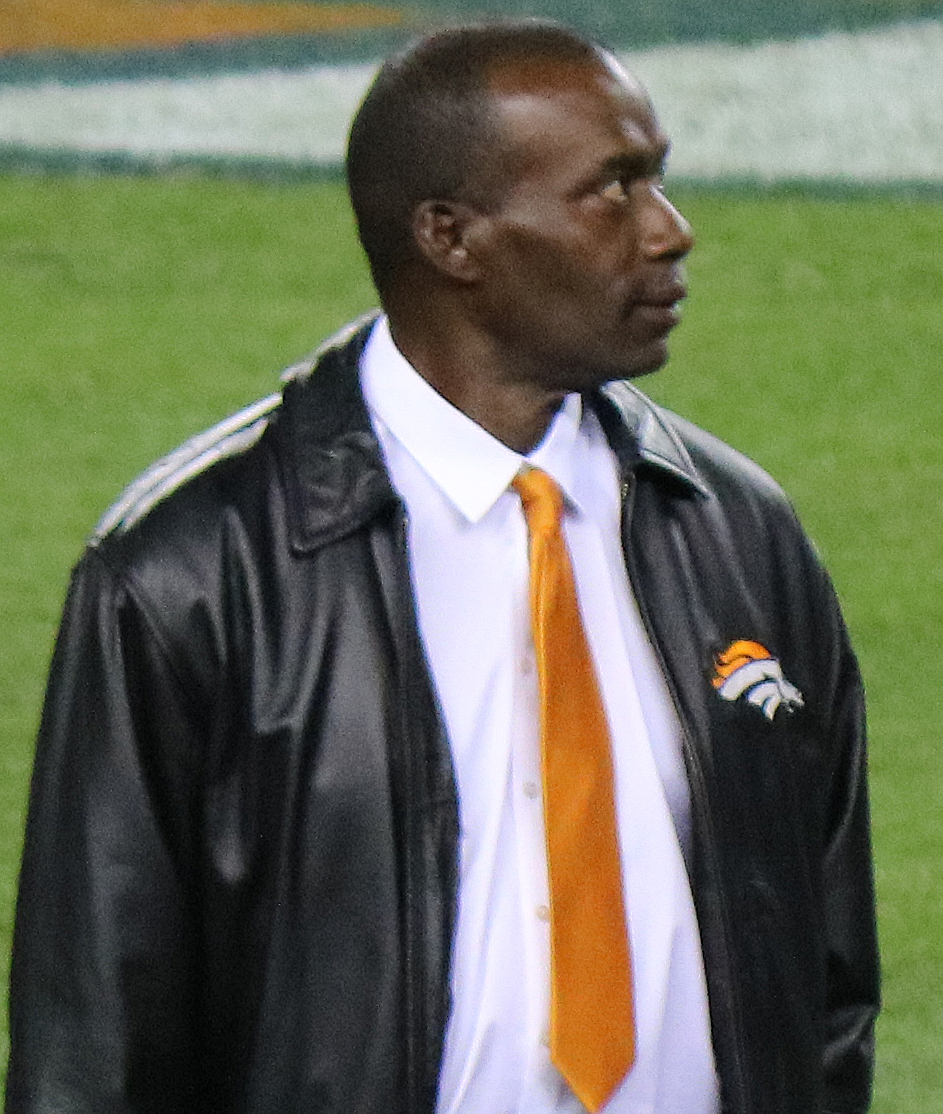
- Fletcher on the field at his Ring of Fame ceremony in 2016

No. 73
- Positions: Linebacker, defensive end

Personal information
- Born: February 18, 1962 (age 64); Bay City, Texas, U.S.
- Listed height: 6 ft 6 in (1.98 m)
- Listed weight: 240 lb (109 kg)

Career information
- High school: Bay City
- College: Houston
- NFL draft: 1985: 2nd round, 54th overall pick

Career history
- Denver Broncos (1985–1995)

Awards and highlights
- Denver Broncos Ring of Fame; Denver Broncos 50th Anniversary Team

Career NFL statistics
- Tackles: 828
- Sacks: 97.5
- Forced fumbles: 20
- Stats at Pro Football Reference

Simon Raynard Fletcher (born February 18, 1962) is an American former professional football player who was a linebacker for the Denver Broncos of the National Football League (NFL). He played college football for the Houston Cougars. Fletcher was selected by the Broncos in the second round of the 1985 NFL draft.

== Professional career ==
Fletcher played for the Denver Broncos for his entire NFL career from 1985 to 1995. In his 11-year career he recorded a Denver Broncos record 97.5 sacks, two interceptions, and 10 fumble recoveries. He shared the NFL record (DeMarcus Ware) for most consecutive games with a sack with 10 until it was broken by Chris Jones of the Kansas City Chiefs in 2018. His four sacks against Minnesota on Nov 4, 1990 tied a franchise record.

In May 2016, Simon Fletcher was inducted into the Broncos' Ring of Fame, along with Denver greats Jason Elam and John Lynch. The three inductees were the 29th, 30th, and 31st members of Denver's Ring of Fame.

He owned a barbecue restaurant named Simon Fletcher's Grid-Iron Grill and BBQ in Fort Morgan, Colorado.

== NFL career statistics ==
=== Regular season ===
Year	Team	Games		Tackles				Interceptions			Fumbles	
Year	Team	GP	GS	Cmb	Solo	Ast	Sck	Int	Yds	TD	FF	FR
1985	DEN	16	1	17	–	–	1.0	0	0	0	0	0
1986	DEN	16	2	43	–	–	5.5	0	0	0	0	2
1987	DEN	12	12	70	–	–	4.0	0	0	0	0	1
1988	DEN	16	16	115	–	–	9.0	1	4	0	0	1
1989	DEN	16	16	105	–	–	12.0	0	0	0	3	1
1990	DEN	16	16	97	–	–	11.0	0	0	0	4	1
1991	DEN	16	16	89	–	–	13.5	0	0	0	2	1
1992	DEN	16	16	99	–	–	16.0	0	0	0	5	0
1993	DEN	16	16	99	–	–	13.5	0	0	0	3	1
1994	DEN	16	16	50	38	12	7.0	1	4	0	1	2
1995	DEN	16	16	44	36	8	5.0	0	0	0	2	0
Career		172	143	828	74	20	97.5	2	8	0	20	10
