= J. B. Brown =

J. B. Brown may refer to:

- J. B. Brown (cornerback) (born 1967), American football cornerback
- John Bundy Brown, American industrialist from Portland, Maine, who owned the Portland Sugar Company
  - J.B. Brown Memorial Block, historic building in Portland, Maine named after John Bundy Brown

== See also ==
- James E. Brown III, American test pilot, nicknamed JB
