= Dennis Smith (safety) =

American football player (born 1959)

No. 49
- Position: Safety

Personal information
- Born: February 3, 1959 (age 67); Santa Monica, California, U.S.
- Listed height: 6 ft 3 in (1.91 m)
- Listed weight: 200 lb (91 kg)

Career information
- High school: Santa Monica
- College: USC
- NFL draft: 1981: 1st round, 15th overall pick

Career history
- Denver Broncos (1981–1994)

Awards and highlights
- 2× First-team All-Pro (1984, 1986); Second-team All-Pro (1989); 6× Pro Bowl (1985, 1986, 1989–1991, 1993); NFL combined tackles leader (1983); Denver Broncos Ring of Fame; National champion (1978); 2× Third-team All-American (1979, 1980); 2× First-team All-Pac-10 (1979, 1980); Second-team All-Pac-10 (1978)

Career NFL statistics
- Interceptions: 30
- Interception yards: 431
- Sacks: 15
- Stats at Pro Football Reference

Dennis Smith (born February 3, 1959) is an American former professional football player who was a safety in the National Football League (NFL) for the Denver Broncos from 1981 until 1994. Smith played college football for the USC Trojans.

== Early life ==
Smith played high school football as a wide receiver and defensive back at Santa Monica High School (Samohi). He was the CIF Southern Section Co-Player of the Year in 1976. Dennis Smith was a great prospect who went on to be a Pro Bowl player. But at that time his standard as a player was to emulate Dennis Thurman, who had been such an outstanding player previously at Samohi in 1974 who also later starred at USC and Smith would eventually follow Thurman as a freshman to run track and play football at USC as a safety. Smith also ran on the track & field team at Santa Monica and broke the HS high jump record (which has since been eclipsed) in 1977. He was coached by Tebb Kusserow. who also coached number of other NFL players such as Dennis Thurman, Junior Thurman, Mel Kaufman, Pat O'Hara, Glyn Milburn, Sam Anno, Damone Johnson, and others notables such as actor Dean Cain. Smith has also been inducted into the Santa Monica High School Hall of Fame for athletes and has had his number "symbolically" retired by the school.

== College career ==
Smith was a consensus All-America choice as a senior at University of Southern California in 1980. He played in two Rose Bowls for the Trojans. He played in a secondary which included three future NFL All-Pros: the San Francisco 49ers' Ronnie Lott and the Minnesota Vikings' Joey Browner in addition to himself. Smith was a consensus All-America choice as he lettered four times in football and three times in track. He posted 205 career tackles and 16 interceptions. He was inducted into the USC Ring of Fame in 2001. Smith played at Southern California (1977–1980) for John Robinson in a star-studded defensive backfield and is a member of the USC team that won the national championship in 1978.

== Professional career ==
Smith established himself as one of the most feared and hardest hitting safeties in the NFL (a reputation later held by his protégé, Steve Atwater). Smith was voted to play in six Pro Bowls (following the 1985–1986, 1989–1991 and 1993 seasons), was named All-American Football Conference (AFC) in 1984 and 1988. He played on three Broncos Super Bowl teams (XXI, XXII, XXIV), and was named All-Pro four times.

Smith's career totals include 1,171 tackles, 30 interceptions and 15 sacks. He posted a career-high five interceptions in 1991. He ranks fourth all-time among Denver Broncos in games played with the franchise with 184. He is the Broncos' leading tackler of all time with 1,152 recorded tackles.

Smith was named the Denver Broncos's most inspirational player in 1992. He was inducted into the Denver Broncos Ring of Fame in 2001 and the Colorado Hall of Fame in 2006.

== NFL career statistics ==
=== Regular season ===
| Year | Team | Games | | Tackles | | | | Interceptions | | | | | Fumbles | | | |
| Year | Team | GP | GS | Comb | Solo | Ast | Sck | Int | Yds | Avg | Lng | TD | FF | FR | Yds | TD |
|---|---|---|---|---|---|---|---|---|---|---|---|---|---|---|---|---|
| 1981 | DEN | 16 | 4 | 45 | — | — | 0.0 | 1 | 65 | 65.0 | 65 | 0 | 0 | 2 | 0 | 0 |
| 1982 | DEN | 8 | 8 | 65 | — | — | 2.0 | 1 | 29 | 29.0 | 29 | 0 | 0 | 0 | 0 | 0 |
| 1983 | DEN | 14 | 13 | 114 | — | — | 5.0 | 4 | 39 | 9.8 | 23 | 0 | 0 | 0 | 0 | 0 |
| 1984 | DEN | 15 | 15 | 92 | — | — | 1.0 | 3 | 13 | 4.3 | 10 | 0 | 0 | 1 | 64 | 1 |
| 1985 | DEN | 13 | 12 | 66 | — | — | 4.0 | 3 | 46 | 15.3 | 39 | 0 | 0 | 0 | 0 | 0 |
| 1986 | DEN | 14 | 14 | 88 | — | — | 1.0 | 1 | 0 | 0.0 | 0 | 0 | 0 | 1 | 0 | 0 |
| 1987 | DEN | 6 | 6 | 35 | — | — | 0.0 | 2 | 21 | 10.5 | 15 | 0 | 0 | 2 | 0 | 0 |
| 1988 | DEN | 11 | 11 | 106 | — | — | 1.0 | 0 | 0 | 0.0 | 0 | 0 | 0 | 2 | 0 | 0 |
| 1989 | DEN | 14 | 14 | 82 | — | — | 0.0 | 2 | 78 | 39.0 | 50 | 0 | 0 | 3 | 0 | 0 |
| 1990 | DEN | 15 | 15 | 110 | — | — | 0.0 | 1 | 13 | 13.0 | 13 | 0 | 0 | 2 | 0 | 0 |
| 1991 | DEN | 16 | 16 | 110 | — | — | 0.0 | 5 | 60 | 12.0 | 39 | 0 | 0 | 1 | 5 | 0 |
| 1992 | DEN | 16 | 16 | 120 | — | — | 0.0 | 4 | 10 | 2.5 | 8 | 0 | 0 | 2 | 0 | 0 |
| 1993 | DEN | 14 | 14 | 96 | — | — | 0.0 | 3 | 57 | 19.0 | 36 | 0 | 1 | 0 | 0 | 0 |
| 1994 | DEN | 12 | 12 | 29 | 23 | 6 | 1.0 | 0 | 0 | 0.0 | 0 | 0 | 0 | 1 | 0 | 0 |
| Career | | 184 | 170 | 1,158 | 23 | 6 | 15.0 | 30 | 431 | 14.4 | 65 | 0 | 1 | 17 | 69 | 1 |
