= Wymon Henderson =

American football player (born 1961)

No. 22, 24
- Position: Cornerback

Personal information
- Born: December 15, 1961 (age 64); North Miami Beach, Florida, U.S.
- Listed height: 5 ft 10 in (1.78 m)
- Listed weight: 190 lb (86 kg)

Career information
- High school: North Miami Beach (FL)
- College: UNLV
- NFL draft: 1985: undrafted

Career history
- Los Angeles Express (1983-1985); San Francisco 49ers (1985)*; Minnesota Vikings (1987–1988); Denver Broncos (1989–1992); Los Angeles Rams (1993–1994)
- * Offseason or practice squad member only

Career NFL statistics
- Tackles: 436
- Interceptions: 16
- Fumble recoveries: 3
- Touchdowns: 2
- Stats at Pro Football Reference

Wymon Henderson (born December 15, 1961) is a former cornerback who played eight seasons for the Minnesota Vikings, Denver Broncos, and Los Angeles Rams in the National Football League (NFL). He started in Super Bowl XXIV.
