= Bobby Humphrey =

American football player (born 1966)

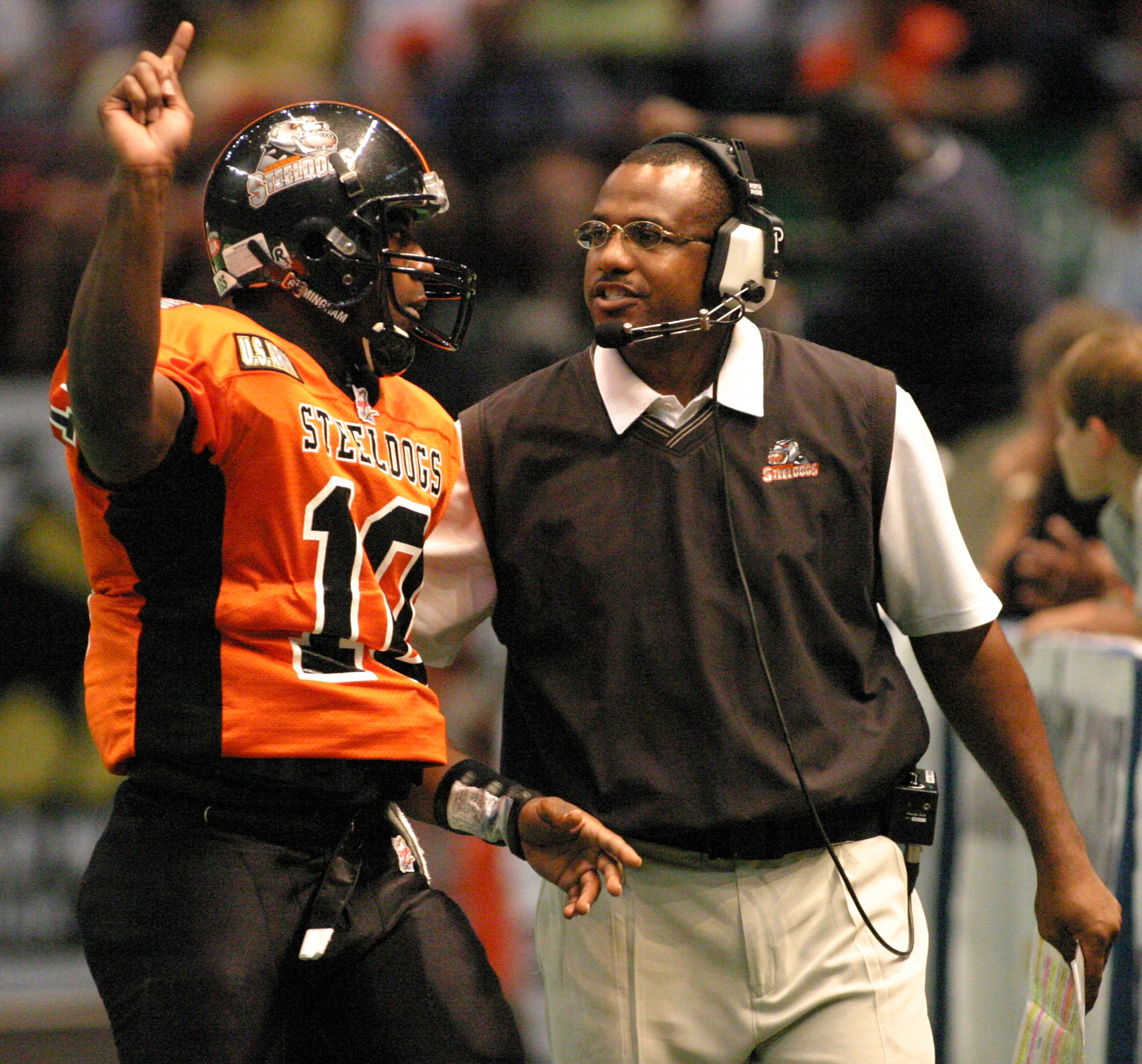
- Humphrey as head coach of the Birmingham Steeldogs in 2005

No. 26, 44
- Position: Running back

Personal information
- Born: October 11, 1966 (age 60); Birmingham, Alabama, U.S.
- Listed height: 6 ft 1 in (1.85 m)
- Listed weight: 201 lb (91 kg)

Career information
- High school: Glenn (Birmingham)
- College: Alabama
- Supplemental draft: 1989: 1st round

Career history
- Denver Broncos (1989–1991); Miami Dolphins (1992–1993); Buffalo Bills (1995)*
- * Offseason or practice squad member only

Awards and highlights
- Pro Bowl (1990); PFWA All-Rookie Team (1989); First-team All-American (1987); Second-team All-American (1986); 2× First-team All-SEC (1986, 1987)

Career NFL statistics
- Rushing yards: 2,857
- Rushing average: 4.1
- Rushing touchdowns: 15
- Stats at Pro Football Reference

Bobby Gene Humphrey (born October 11, 1966) is an American former professional football player who was a running back for the Denver Broncos and Miami Dolphins in the National Football League (NFL). He played college football for the Alabama Crimson Tide, twice earning All-American honors.

== College career ==
Humphrey played from 1985 to 1988 for the Crimson Tide. During his freshman year, he would share the backfield with Gene Jelks and Kerry Goode. He would rush for 502 yards, on 99 carries, and 4 touchdowns. During his sophomore year, he led the Crimson Tide in rushing with 1,471 yards and scored 15 touchdowns. The season ended on Christmas Day in the Sun Bowl against the Washington Huskies. Humphrey scored three touchdowns, and the Tide finished with a 10–3 record. He was named to an All-American team. In 1987, Bobby Humphrey was once again the featured back for the Tide. Rushing for 1,255 yards on 238 carries, and 11 touchdowns. One of the highlights of his junior year, was a 220-yard rushing performance against Penn State. On Halloween night, against Mississippi State he would pass Johnny Musso as Alabama's all-time leading rusher. Alabama would finish the year in the 1988 Hall of Fame Bowl, where Humphrey would score two touchdowns in a losing effort. He was once again named to an All-American team, and finished tenth in the Heisman Trophy voting. During spring practice, he would break his left foot. He started his senior season against Temple, scoring a touchdown. But two weeks later, he would break his foot again ending his college career. He finished with 3,420 rushing yards and 33 touchdowns. At the end of his college career, no Alabama running back had more 200 yard rushing games, with four, and more 100 yard rushing games, with sixteen, than Bobby Humphrey.

In his four seasons playing for the Crimson Tide, Humphrey rushed for 3,420 yards (a school record at the time), caught 60 passes for 523 yards, and scored 40 touchdowns. He made the College Football All-America Team in 1986 and 1987. In 1986, he set a school record with 1,471 rushing yards. In 1987, he was voted as UPI's offensive player of the year and finished 10th in the Heisman Trophy balloting.

== Professional career ==
Humphrey was one of five players selected in the 1989 NFL Supplemental Draft, selected in the first round by the Denver Broncos. During his rookie season, he rushed for 1,151 yards and seven touchdowns for the Broncos; he also threw a 17-yard touchdown pass and hauled in a touchdown reception. The Broncos qualified for Super Bowl XXIV, but were defeated 55–10 by the San Francisco 49ers. Humphrey, although finishing the game as the Broncos leader in both rushing (61 yards) and receiving (31 yards), had a key turnover in the first quarter when he fumbled near midfield. Following this fumble, the 49ers would score 34 unanswered points to put the game away. He followed his rookie season with a Pro Bowl selection in 1990, rushing for 1,202 yards and seven touchdowns in 1990. Humphrey was the first Denver Bronco to rush for 1,000 yards in back-to-back seasons.

In 1991, Humphrey held out of training camp in hopes of obtaining a new contract. The Broncos, by team policy, refused to renegotiate his pay and the holdout continued late into the season. Unable to secure a new contract, Humphrey finally ended his holdout in week 14. However, by that time, newly signed Gaston Green had emerged as the team's starting running back and was on his way to completing his own 1,000-yard season. Furthermore, Humphrey had fallen out of favor with the team's coaching and front office as a result of the holdout. When Humphrey returned in week 14, he was out of shape and given only a reserve role in the Broncos' offense. He remained on the bench as Denver made a run to the AFC Championship Game, losing to the Buffalo Bills 10–7.

The following offseason, Humphrey was traded to the Miami Dolphins in exchange for running back Sammie Smith. He played for the Dolphins in 1992 scoring only one rushing touchdown and running for 471 yards; he also finished with 507 receiving yards and a touchdown reception. With his new team, Humphrey returned to the AFC Championship Game for the second consecutive season, losing again to the Buffalo Bills. After being out of football for two seasons, Humphrey attempted a comeback in 1995 with the Bills, but failed to make the team.

== NFL career statistics ==
Legend
**Bold**	Career high

=== Regular season ===
Year	Team	Games		Rushing					Receiving				
Year	Team	GP	GS	Att	Yds	Avg	Lng	TD	Rec	Yds	Avg	Lng	TD
1989	DEN	**16**	12	**294**	1,151	3.9	**40**	**7**	22	156	7.1	13	**1**
1990	DEN	15	**14**	288	**1,202**	4.2	37	**7**	24	152	6.3	**26**	0
1991	DEN	4	0	11	33	3.0	7	0	0	0	0.0	0	0
1992	MIA	**16**	1	102	471	**4.6**	21	1	**54**	**507**	**9.4**	**26**	**1**
Career		51	27	695	2,857	4.1	40	15	100	815	8.2	26	2

=== Playoffs ===
Year	Team	Games		Rushing					Receiving				
Year	Team	GP	GS	Att	Yds	Avg	Lng	TD	Rec	Yds	Avg	Lng	TD
1989	DEN	**3**	**3**	**38**	**169**	**4.4**	**34**	0	5	67	**13.4**	**27**	0
1992	MIA	2	2	31	93	3.0	15	0	**9**	**71**	7.9	20	0
Career		5	5	69	262	3.8	34	0	14	138	9.9	27	0

== Arena football coaching career ==
In August 1999, the Birmingham Steeldogs formed as part of a new indoor football league called AF2, a developmental league for the Arena Football League. Humphrey, with no coaching experience at that level, was named head coach. Over the course of six seasons, Humphrey guided the Steeldogs to a 51–50 record. After a disappointing 2–14 season, Humphrey was dismissed in 2005. The Steeldogs would rename themselves as the Alabama Steeldogs one year later, before ceasing operations following the 2007 season. The league would fold in 2009. Humphrey, at the time of his dismissal, was the second-winningest coach in the league.

== Post-football activities ==
In 1998, Humphrey returned to the University of Alabama, and earned a bachelor's degree in social work. In 2004, he was inducted into the Alabama Sports Hall of Fame. During his time coaching in AF2, he owned and operated Humphrey Construction Company. As of 2012, Humphrey is vice president of business development for Bryant Bank in Birmingham, Alabama. He was appointed to the City of Hoover's Parks and Recreation Board in 2014. In the summer of 2016, Humphrey was one of 75 players to be eligible for the 2017 Class for the College Football Hall of Fame.

== Personal life ==
Humphrey is married. He and his wife Barbara have five children. Two of his sons have gone on to play college football. Maudrecus Humphrey played for the University of Arkansas and UAB. Marlon Humphrey followed his father's footsteps and played for Alabama, donning his father's jersey number 26, before being selected 16th overall by the Baltimore Ravens in the 2017 NFL draft.

== Shooting incident ==
In February 1993, Humphrey was shot in his right thigh by friend and former teammate Mark Petties on an Alabama highway. Humphrey and Petties were returning from New Orleans, driving northbound on Interstate 65 in Humphrey's vehicle, when a fight ensued. The origin of the dispute was never made clear. A passing motorist saw the two fighting on the highway shoulder in Alabaster, AL, and called local police. When they arrived, Humphrey, 26, was lying on the ground. Humphrey was treated at Shelby Medical Center and released hours after the bullet was removed.

Eight days before the shooting incident, Humphrey had been arrested for cocaine possession, aggravated assault and destruction of hotel property in Columbus, GA.
