= 1994 New York Giants season =

NFL team season

- Head coach: Dan Reeves
- Home stadium: Giants Stadium

Results
- Record: 9–7
- Division place: 2nd NFC East
- Playoffs: Did not qualify
- Pro Bowlers: None

The 1994 New York Giants season was the franchise's 70th season in the National Football League (NFL) and the second under head coach Dan Reeves. The Giants failed to improve on their 11–5 record from 1993 and finished 9–7 in 1994. They were second in the National Football Conference East Division, three games behind the Dallas Cowboys.

In the 1994 NFL draft, the Giants selected wide receiver Thomas Lewis in the first round, with the 24th overall pick. New York began the season with a three-game winning streak, defeating the Philadelphia Eagles, Arizona Cardinals, and Washington Redskins. The Giants' first loss came in their fourth game, as the New Orleans Saints defeated them 27–22. The next six games were also losses; after the Cardinals beat them 10–9 in week 11, New York's record was 3–7. Against the Houston Oilers, the Giants snapped their seven-game losing streak by winning 13–10. The team won its next four games, moving into postseason contention following its second win over Philadelphia. In the final game of the regular season, against the defending Super Bowl champion Cowboys, the Giants prevailed by five points, 15–10. They needed a Green Bay loss as well to make the playoffs; the Packers won their last game; ending the Giants' season.

Rodney Hampton rushed for 1,075 yards and six touchdowns during the season; he was seventh in the NFL in rushing yards in 1994. The Giants' leading receiver statistically was Mike Sherrard, who caught 53 passes for 825 yards and six touchdowns. Dave Brown started 15 of 16 games at quarterback, and threw 12 touchdown passes and 16 interceptions. Defensively, Keith Hamilton and Erik Howard each had 6.5 sacks to lead the Giants, while John Booty and Phillippi Sparks each had a team-high three interceptions.

== Offseason ==
The Giants went through some roster changes after the 1993 season in free agency. Among the departures were Bart Oates, who was signed by the San Francisco 49ers; Mark Collins, who the Kansas City Chiefs signed; Myron Guyton, who joined former coach Bill Parcells with the New England Patriots; and Perry Williams, who signed with the New York Jets. Simms started all 16 games in 1993, being one of only seven quarterbacks to do so, and was named a member of the Pro Bowl team for his performance, having led the Giants to an 11–5 season that included a victory over the Minnesota Vikings in the playoffs. However, Simms underwent shoulder surgery after the 1993 season to repair a torn labrum. The surgery was successful, and team doctor Russell F. Warren's prognosis for recovery was excellent. Simms was expected to be ready in time for training camp. However, later during that offseason, Simms was released by the Giants, and subsequently decided to retire.

Additions	Subtractions
S Jarvis Williams (Dolphins)	QB Phil Simms (retirement)
S John Booty (Cardinals)	LB Lawrence Taylor (retirement)
	C Bart Oates (49ers)
	CB Mark Collins (Chiefs)
	S Myron Guyton (Patriots)
	CB Perry Williams (Jets)

=== NFL draft ===
1994 New York Giants draft
Round	Pick	Player	Position	College	Notes
1	24	Thomas Lewis	WR	Indiana	
2	47	Thomas Randolph	CB	Kansas State	
2	59	Jason Sehorn	CB	USC	
3	95	Gary Downs	RB	NC State	
4	128	Chris Maumalanga	DT	Kansas	
4	Supplemental	Tito Wooten	S	Houston	
5	155	Chad Bratzke	DE	Eastern Kentucky	
6	186	Jason Winrow	G	Ohio State	
Made roster † Pro Football Hall of Fame * Made at least one Pro Bowl during career

== Personnel ==
=== Staff ===
1994 New York Giants staff
Front office: President/co-chief executive officer – Wellington Mara; Chairman/co-chief executive officer – Preston Robert Tisch; Executive vice president/general counsel – John Mara; Vice president/general manager – George Young; Assistant general manager – Harry Hulmes; Director of player personnel – Tom Boisture; Director of pro personnel – Tim Rooney; Assistant director of player personnel – Rick Donohue; Director of college scouting – Jerry Shay; Head coaches: Head coach – Dan Reeves; Offensive coaches: Offensive coordinator/quarterbacks – George Henshaw; Running backs – George Sefcik; Wide receivers – Dick Rehbein; Tight ends – James Daniel; Offensive line – Pete Mangurian	Defensive coaches: Defensive coordinator – Mike Nolan; Defensive line – Earl Leggett; Linebackers – Don Blackmon; Defensive backs – Zaven Yaralian; Special teams coaches: Special teams – Joe DeCamillis; Strength and conditioning: Strength and conditioning – Al Miller; Asst. strength and conditioning – Kerry Goode

=== Roster ===
1994 New York Giants roster
Quarterbacks (QB): 17 Dave Brown; 10 Kent Graham; 8 Stan White; Running backs (RB): 34 Gary Downs; 20 Keith Elias; 27 Rodney Hampton; 30 Dave Meggett; 44 Kenyon Rasheed; Wide receivers (WR): 80 Chris Calloway; 82 Omar Douglas; 89 Gary Harrell; 83 Arthur Marshall KR; 88 Mike Sherrard; Tight ends (TE): 86 Derek Brown; 87 Howard Cross; 85 Brian Kozlowski; 84 Aaron Pierce	Offensive linemen (OL): 78 Greg Bishop T; 62 Scott Davis G; 76 Jumbo Elliott T; 63 Darren Reese G; 72 Doug Riesenberg T; 66 William Roberts G; 67 Adam Schreiber C; 61 Lance Smith G; 59 Brian Williams C; Defensive linemen (DL): 77 Chad Bratzke DE; 71 Stacey Dillard DT; 93 Mike Fox DT; 75 Keith Hamilton DE; 74 Erik Howard DT; 99 Chris Maumalanga DT; 91 Coleman Rudolph DE; 92 Michael Strahan DE	Linebackers (LB): 98 Jessie Armstead OLB; 54 Carlton Bailey ILB; 94 Michael Brooks ILB; 55 Marcus Buckley OLB; 57 Corey Miller OLB; 58 Pete Shufelt OLB; 90 Corey Widmer MLB; Defensive backs (DB): 21 Willie Beamon CB; 41 John Booty S; 37 Jesse Campbell FS; 23 Thomas Randolph CB; 39 Corey Raymond CB; 31 Jason Sehorn CB; 22 Phillippi Sparks CB; 26 Jarvis Williams SS; 29 Tito Wooten FS; Special teams (ST): 3 Brad Daluiso K; 2 Mike Horan P; 18 David Treadwell K	Practice squad: 25 Leon Brown RB; Reserve: 81 Thomas Lewis WR (IR); 51 Andre Powell LB (IR); 68 Jason Winrow G (IR); Rookies in italics 53 active, 3 reserve, 1 practice squad

== Preseason ==
Week	Date	Opponent	Result	Record	Venue
1	July 30	Miami Dolphins	L 19–20	0–1	Giants Stadium
2	August 6	Cleveland Browns	L 15–24	0–2	Giants Stadium
3	August 13	at San Diego Chargers	W 28–20	1–2	Olympiastadion (Berlin)
4	August 20	at New York Jets	L 10–13	1–3	Giants Stadium
5	August 27	at Chicago Bears	L 21–27	1–4	Soldier Field

== Regular season ==
=== Schedule ===
Week	Date	Opponent	Result	Record	Venue	Recap
1	September 4	**Philadelphia Eagles**	**W** 28–23	1–0	Giants Stadium	Recap
2	September 11	at **Arizona Cardinals**	**W** 20–17	2–0	Sun Devil Stadium	Recap
3	September 18	**Washington Redskins**	**W** 31–23	3–0	Giants Stadium	Recap
4	Bye					
5	October 2	at New Orleans Saints	**L** 22–27	3–1	Louisiana Superdome	Recap
6	October 10	Minnesota Vikings	**L** 10–27	3–2	Giants Stadium	Recap
7	October 16	at Los Angeles Rams	**L** 10–17	3–3	Anaheim Stadium	Recap
8	October 23	Pittsburgh Steelers	**L** 6–10	3–4	Giants Stadium	Recap
9	October 30	Detroit Lions	**L** 25–28 (OT)	3–5	Giants Stadium	Recap
10	November 7	at **Dallas Cowboys**	**L** 10–38	3–6	Texas Stadium	Recap
11	November 13	**Arizona Cardinals**	**L** 9–10	3–7	Giants Stadium	Recap
12	November 21	at Houston Oilers	**W** 13–10	4–7	Houston Astrodome	Recap
13	November 27	at **Washington Redskins**	**W** 21–19	5–7	RFK Stadium	Recap
14	December 4	at Cleveland Browns	**W** 16–13	6–7	Cleveland Municipal Stadium	Recap
15	December 11	Cincinnati Bengals	**W** 27–20	7–7	Giants Stadium	Recap
16	December 18	at **Philadelphia Eagles**	**W** 16–13	8–7	Veterans Stadium	Recap
17	December 24	**Dallas Cowboys**	**W** 15–10	9–7	Giants Stadium	Recap
Note: Intra-division opponents are in **bold** text.

=== Game summaries ===
==== Week 1: vs. Philadelphia Eagles ====
Week 1: Philadelphia Eagles at New York Giants – Game summary

Quarter	1	2	3	4	Total
Eagles	0	10	3	10	**23**
**Giants**	14	7	7	0	**28**

at Giants Stadium, East Rutherford, New Jersey

- Date: September 4
- Game time: 1:00 p.m. EDT
- Game weather: Mostly sunny, 65 °F (18 °C)
- Game attendance: 76,130
- Referee: Larry Nemmers
- TV announcers (Fox): Dick Stockton and Matt Millen

Game information

**First quarter**

- NYG – Rodney Hampton 1-yard run (David Treadwell kick), 3:45. Giants 7–0.
- NYG – Dave Meggett 68-yard punt return (David Treadwell kick), 1:06. Giants 14–0.

**Second quarter**

- PHI – Eddie Murray 21-yard field goal, 13:44. Giants 14–3.
- NYG – Chris Calloway 51-yard pass from Dave Brown (David Treadwell kick), 11:09. Giants 21–3.
- PHI – Mark Bavaro 3-yard pass from Randall Cunningham (Eddie Murray kick), 0:39. Giants 21–10.

**Third quarter**

- PHI – Eddie Murray 39-yard field goal, 11:39. Giants 21–13.
- NYG – Dave Meggett 26-yard run (David Treadwell kick), 4:05. Giants 28–13.

**Fourth quarter**

- PHI – Eddie Murray 36-yard field goal, 12:09. Giants 28–16.
- PHI – Calvin Williams 10-yard pass from Randall Cunningham (Eddie Murray kick), 1:19. Giants 28–23.

**Top passers**

- PHI – Randall Cunningham – 20/39, 344 yards, 2 TD
- NYG – Dave Brown – 10/20, 171 yards, TD, INT

**Top rushers**

- PHI – Randall Cunningham – 5 rushes, 35 yards
- NYG – Rodney Hampton – 21 rushes, 85 yards, TD

**Top receivers**

- PHI – Herschel Walker – 1 reception, 93 yards
- NYG – Chris Calloway – 3 receptions, 74 yards, TD

==== Week 2: at Arizona Cardinals ====
Week 2: New York Giants at Arizona Cardinals – Game summary

Quarter	1	2	3	4	Total
**Giants**	6	14	0	0	**20**
Cardinals	3	7	0	7	**17**

at Sun Devil Stadium, Tucson, Arizona

- Date: September 11
- Game time: 8:00 p.m. EDT/6:00 p.m. MDT
- Game weather: Clear, 87 °F (31 °C)
- Game attendance: 60,066
- Referee: Jerry Markbreit
- TV announcers (TNT): Gary Bender and Pat Haden

Game information

**First quarter**

- NYG – Howard Cross 1-yard pass from Dave Brown (kick failed), 11:55. Giants 6–0.
- ARI – Greg Davis 21-yard field goal, 1:48. Giants 6–3.

**Second quarter**

- ARI – Fred McAfee 2-yard run (Greg Davis kick), 14:57. Cardinals 10–6.
- NYG – Rodney Hampton 3-yard run (David Treadwell kick), 8:53. Giants 13–10.
- NYG – Howard Cross 1-yard pass from Dave Brown (David Treadwell kick), 0:15. Giants 20–10.

**Third quarter**

- No scoring plays.

**Fourth quarter**

- ARI – Ronald Moore 2-yard pass from Jim McMahon (Greg Davis kick), 10:52. Giants 20–17.

**Top passers**

- NYG – Dave Brown – 11/17, 119 yards, 2 TD, INT
- ARI – Steve Beuerlein – 10/22, 108 yards, INT

**Top rushers**

- NYG – Dave Meggett – 15 rushes, 44 yards
- ARI – Ronald Moore – 10 rushes, 25 yards

**Top receivers**

- NYG – Kenyon Rasheed – 3 receptions, 47 yards
- ARI – Randal Hill – 5 receptions, 62 yards

==== Week 3: vs. Washington Redskins ====
Week 3: Washington Redskins at New York Giants – Game summary

Quarter	1	2	3	4	Total
Redskins	3	17	0	3	**23**
**Giants**	10	7	7	7	**31**

at Giants Stadium, East Rutherford, New Jersey

- Date: September 18
- Game time: 4:00 p.m. EDT
- Game weather: Scattered clouds, 70 °F (21 °C)
- Game attendance: 77,298
- Referee: Howard Roe
- TV announcers (Fox): Pat Summerall and John Madden

Game information

**First quarter**

- NYG – Dave Meggett 2-yard run (David Treadwell kick), 10:22. Giants 7–0.
- WAS – Chip Lohmiller 25-yard field goal, 5:51. Giants 7–3.
- NYG – David Treadwell 34-yard field goal, 2:19. Giants 10–3.

**Second quarter**

- WAS – Henry Ellard 3-yard pass from John Friesz (Chip Lohmiller kick), 9:42. Tied 10–10.
- WAS – Chip Lohmiller 41-yard field goal, 7:22. Redskins 13–10.
- NYG – Mike Sherrard 30-yard pass from Dave Brown (David Treadwell kick), 4:14. Giants 17–13.
- WAS – Ethan Horton 3-yard pass from John Friesz (Chip Lohmiller kick), 1:08. Redskins 20–17.

**Third quarter**

- NYG – Aaron Pierce 16-yard pass from Dave Meggett (David Treadwell kick), 11:40. Giants 24–20.

**Fourth quarter**

- WAS – Chip Lohmiller 35-yard field goal, 13:08. Giants 24–23.
- NYG – Dave Meggett 1-yard run (David Treadwell kick), 7:09. Giants 31–23.

**Top passers**

- WAS – John Friesz – 32/50, 381 yards, 2 TD, 2 INT
- NYG – Dave Brown – 14/19, 221 yards, TD

**Top rushers**

- WAS – Reggie Brooks – 13 rushes, 57 yards
- NYG – Dave Meggett – 26 rushes, 82 yards, 2 TD

**Top receivers**

- WAS – Henry Ellard – 10 receptions, 197 yards, TD
- NYG – Mike Sherrard – 3 receptions, 71 yards, TD

==== Week 5: at New Orleans Saints ====
Week 5: New York Giants at New Orleans Saints – Game summary

Quarter	1	2	3	4	Total
Giants	3	10	0	9	**22**
**Saints**	3	14	3	7	**27**

at Louisiana Superdome, New Orleans, Louisiana

- Date: October 2
- Game time: 4:00 p.m. EDT/3:00 p.m. CDT
- Game weather: None (indoor stadium)
- Game attendance: 55,076
- Referee: Gordon McCarter
- TV announcers (Fox): Joe Buck and Tim Green

Game information

**First quarter**

- NYG – David Treadwell 41-yard field goal, 5:49. Giants 3–0.
- NO – Morten Andersen 29-yard field goal, 0:21. Tied 3–3.

**Second quarter**

- NYG – Mike Sherrard 10-yard pass from Dave Brown (David Treadwell kick), 7:50. Giants 10–3.
- NYG – David Treadwell 32-yard field goal, 5:07. Giants 13–3.
- NO – Quinn Early 4-yard pass from Jim Everett (Morten Andersen kick), 1:56. Giants 13–10.
- NO – James Williams 33-yard interception return (Morten Andersen kick), 1:00. Saints 17–13.

**Third quarter**

- NO – Morten Andersen 32-yard field goal, 10:37. Saints 20–13.

**Fourth quarter**

- NO – Derek Brown 3-yard run (Morten Andersen kick), 13:35. Saints 27–13.
- NYG – David Treadwell 35-yard field goal, 8:02. Saints 27–16.
- NYG – Mike Sherrard 3-yard pass from Dave Brown (run failed), 2:04. Saints 27–22.

**Top passers**

- NYG – Dave Brown – 20/35, 180 yards, 2 TD, 2 INT
- NO – Jim Everett – 20/30, 249 yards, TD, INT

**Top rushers**

- NYG – Dave Meggett – 16 rushes, 40 yards
- NO – Derek Brown – 22 rushes, 64 yards, TD

**Top receivers**

- NYG – Howard Cross – 3 receptions, 66 yards
- NO – Michael Haynes – 2 receptions, 68 yards

==== Week 6: vs. Minnesota Vikings ====
Week 6: Minnesota Vikings at New York Giants – Game summary

Quarter	1	2	3	4	Total
**Vikings**	3	7	14	3	**27**
Giants	0	10	0	0	**10**

at Giants Stadium, East Rutherford, New Jersey

- Date: October 10
- Game time: 9:00 p.m. EDT
- Game weather: Clear, 60 °F (16 °C)
- Game attendance: 77,294
- Referee: Tom White
- TV announcers (ABC): Al Michaels, Frank Gifford, Dan Dierdorf and Lynn Swann

Game information

**First quarter**

- MIN – Fuad Reveiz 44-yard field goal, 3:42. Vikings 3–0.

**Second quarter**

- NYG – David Treadwell 22-yard field goal, 13:36. Tied 3–3.
- MIN – Terry Allen 1-yard run (Fuad Reveiz kick), 5:31. Vikings 10–3.
- NYG – Dave Brown 3-yard run (David Treadwell kick), 0:07. Tied 10–10.

**Third quarter**

- MIN – Anthony Parker 44-yard interception return (Fuad Reveiz kick), 13:16. Vikings 17–10.
- MIN – Cris Carter 20-yard pass from Warren Moon (Fuad Reveiz kick), 2:48. Vikings 24–10.

**Fourth quarter**

- MIN – Fuad Reveiz 24-yard field goal, 13:20. Vikings 27–10.

**Top passers**

- MIN – Warren Moon – 23/34, 299 yards, TD, INT
- NYG – Dave Brown – 19/36, 226 yards, 3 INT

**Top rushers**

- MIN – Terry Allen – 21 rushes, 75 yards, TD
- NYG – Rodney Hampton – 13 rushes, 27 yards

**Top receivers**

- MIN – Qadry Ismail – 7 receptions, 117 yards
- NYG – Mike Sherrard – 4 receptions, 49 yards

==== Week 7: at Los Angeles Rams ====
Week 7: New York Giants at Los Angeles Rams – Game summary

Quarter	1	2	3	4	Total
Giants	7	3	0	0	**10**
**Rams**	14	3	0	0	**17**

at Anaheim Stadium, Anaheim, California

- Date: October 16
- Game time: 4:00 p.m. EDT/1:00 p.m. PDT
- Game weather: Partly cloudy, 65 °F (18 °C)
- Game attendance: 40,747
- Referee: Ed Hochuli
- TV announcers (Fox): Kevin Harlan and Jerry Glanville

Game information

**First quarter**

- LA – Isaac Bruce 19-yard pass from Chris Miller (Tony Zendejas kick), 10:41. Rams 7–0.
- NYG – Rodney Hampton 27-yard run (David Treadwell kick), 4:31. Tied 7–7.
- LA – Troy Drayton 12-yard pass from Chris Miller (Tony Zendejas kick), 1:08. Rams 14–7.

**Second quarter**

- NYG – David Treadwell 24-yard field goal, 9:44. Rams 14–10.
- LA – Tony Zendejas 22-yard field goal, 3:22. Rams 17–10.

**Third quarter**

- No scoring plays.

**Fourth quarter**

- No scoring plays.

**Top passers**

- NYG – Dave Brown – 15/27, 165 yards, 2 INT
- LA – Chris Miller – 13/26, 197 yards, 2 TD, INT

**Top rushers**

- NYG – Rodney Hampton – 27 rushes, 112 yards, TD
- LA – Jerome Bettis – 30 rushes, 88 yards

**Top receivers**

- NYG – Mike Sherrard – 4 receptions, 66 yards
- LA – Jerome Bettis – 3 receptions, 62 yards

==== Week 8: vs. Pittsburgh Steelers ====
Week 8: Pittsburgh Steelers at New York Giants – Game summary

Quarter	1	2	3	4	Total
**Steelers**	0	3	0	7	**10**
Giants	3	3	0	0	**6**

at Giants Stadium, East Rutherford, New Jersey

- Date: October 23
- Game time: 1:00 p.m. EDT
- Game weather: Light rain, 62 °F (17 °C)
- Game attendance: 71,819
- Referee: Bernie Kukar
- TV announcers (NBC): Dick Enberg, Bob Trumpy and Hannah Storm

Game information

**First quarter**

- NYG – David Treadwell 19-yard field goal, 4:46. Giants 3–0.

**Second quarter**

- NYG – Brad Daluiso 49-yard field goal, 9:40. Giants 6–0.
- PIT – Gary Anderson 29-yard field goal, 3:38. Giants 6–3.

**Third quarter**

- No scoring plays.

**Fourth quarter**

- PIT – Bam Morris 6-yard run (Gary Anderson kick), 8:17. Steelers 10–6.

**Top passers**

- PIT – Neil O'Donnell – 16/29, 138 yards, INT
- NYG – Dave Brown – 13/25, 206 yards, 2 INT

**Top rushers**

- PIT – Bam Morris – 29 rushes, 146 yards, TD
- NYG – Rodney Hampton – 18 rushes, 34 yards

**Top receivers**

- PIT – Andre Hastings – 3 receptions, 38 yards
- NYG – Chris Calloway – 3 receptions, 93 yards

==== Week 9: vs. Detroit Lions ====
Week 9: Detroit Lions at New York Giants – Game summary

Quarter	1	2	3	4	OT	Total
**Lions**	2	6	10	7	3	**28**
Giants	0	10	0	15	0	**25**

at Giants Stadium, East Rutherford, New Jersey

- Date: October 30
- Game time: 1:00 p.m. EST
- Game weather: Sunny, 59 °F (15 °C)
- Game attendance: 75,124
- Referee: Gary Lane
- TV announcers (Fox): Pat Summerall, John Madden and Anthony Muñoz

Game information

**First quarter**

- DET – Dave Brown fumble out of bounds in end zone for a safety, 5:30. Lions 2–0.

**Second quarter**

- NYG – Rodney Hampton 4-yard run (David Treadwell kick), 10:34. Giants 7–2.
- NYG – David Treadwell 25-yard field goal, 1:15. Giants 10–2.
- DET – Herman Moore 14-yard pass from Scott Mitchell (pass failed), 0:25. Giants 10–8.

**Third quarter**

- DET – Jason Hanson 31-yard field goal, 8:13. Lions 11–10.
- DET – Mike Johnson 48-yard interception return (Jason Hanson kick), 3:44. Lions 18–10.

**Fourth quarter**

- NYG – Dave Meggett 56-yard punt return (Hampton run), 11:07. Tied 18–18.
- DET – Herman Moore 1-yard pass from Scott Mitchell (Jason Hanson kick), 8:48. Lions 25–18.
- NYG – Aaron Pierce 7-yard pass from Dave Brown (David Treadwell kick), 1:15. Tied 25–25.

**Overtime**

- DET – Jason Hanson 24-yard field goal, 8:17. Lions 28–25.

**Top passers**

- DET – Scott Mitchell – 16/30, 180 yards, 2 TD, 3 INT
- NYG – Dave Brown – 19/29, 159 yards, TD, INT

**Top rushers**

- DET – Barry Sanders – 26 rushes, 146 yards
- NYG – Rodney Hampton – 30 rushes, 138 yards, TD

**Top receivers**

- DET – Herman Moore – 9 receptions, 106 yards, 2 TD
- NYG – Aaron Pierce – 5 receptions, 49 yards, TD

==== Week 10: at Dallas Cowboys ====
Week 10: New York Giants at Dallas Cowboys – Game summary

Quarter	1	2	3	4	Total
Giants	0	3	0	7	**10**
**Cowboys**	0	14	21	3	**38**

at Texas Stadium, Irving, Texas

- Date: November 7
- Game time: 9:00 p.m. EST/8:00 p.m. CST
- Game weather: Scattered clouds, 60 °F (16 °C)
- Game attendance: 64,836
- Referee: Johnny Grier
- TV announcers (ABC): Al Michaels, Frank Gifford, Dan Dierdorf and Lynn Swann

Game information

**First quarter**

- No scoring plays.

**Second quarter**

- DAL – Alvin Harper 22-yard pass from Troy Aikman (Chris Boniol kick), 14:55. Cowboys 7–0.
- NYG – David Treadwell 23-yard field goal, 9:54. Cowboys 7–3.
- DAL – Emmitt Smith 1-yard run (Chris Boniol kick), 2:47. Cowboys 14–3.

**Third quarter**

- DAL – Emmitt Smith 1-yard run (Chris Boniol kick), 12:29. Cowboys 21–3.
- DAL – Troy Aikman 3-yard run (Chris Boniol kick), 5:02. Cowboys 28–3.
- DAL – Daryl Johnston 9-yard run (Chris Boniol kick), 0:29. Cowboys 35–3.

**Fourth quarter**

- DAL – Chris Boniol 45-yard field goal, 11:12. Cowboys 38–3.
- NYG – Howard Cross 9-yard pass from Kent Graham (David Treadwell kick), 5:46. Cowboys 38–10.

**Top passers**

- NYG – Kent Graham – 9/14, 98 yards, TD, INT
- DAL – Troy Aikman – 19/24, 241 yards, TD

**Top rushers**

- NYG – Gary Downs – 7 rushes, 28 yards
- DAL – Emmitt Smith – 35 rushes, 163 yards, 2 TD

**Top receivers**

- NYG – Howard Cross – 5 receptions, 44 yards, TD
- DAL – Michael Irvin – 7 receptions, 118 yards, TD

==== Week 11: vs. Arizona Cardinals ====
Week 11: Arizona Cardinals at New York Giants – Game summary

Quarter	1	2	3	4	Total
**Cardinals**	0	0	3	7	**10**
Giants	7	2	0	0	**9**

at Giants Stadium, East Rutherford, New Jersey

- Date: November 13
- Game time: 1:00 p.m. EST
- Game weather: Cloudy, 52 °F (11 °C)
- Game attendance: 71,719
- Referee: Bob McElwee
- TV announcers (Fox): Joe Buck and Tim Green

Game information

**First quarter**

- NYG – Aaron Pierce 4-yard pass from Kent Graham (David Treadwell kick), 5:13. Giants 7–0.

**Second quarter**

- NYG – Holding penalty on Ernest Dye enforced in endzone for a safety, 3:15. Giants 9–0.

**Third quarter**

- ARI – Greg Davis 45-yard field goal, 5:08. Giants 9–3.

**Fourth quarter**

- ARI – Bryan Reeves 9-yard pass from Steve Beuerlein (Greg Davis kick), 1:39. Cardinals 10–9.

**Top passers**

- ARI – Steve Beuerlein – 17/33, 180 yards, TD, INT
- NYG – Kent Graham – 9/26, 92 yards, TD, INT

**Top rushers**

- ARI – Ronald Moore – 13 rushes, 44 yards
- NYG – Rodney Hampton – 26 rushes, 93 yards

**Top receivers**

- ARI – Ricky Proehl – 4 receptions, 39 yards
- NYG – Howard Cross – 2 receptions, 36 yards

==== Week 12: at Houston Oilers ====
Week 12: New York Giants at Houston Oilers – Game summary

Quarter	1	2	3	4	Total
**Giants**	0	0	7	6	**13**
Oilers	0	0	7	3	**10**

at Houston Astrodome, Houston, Texas

- Date: November 21
- Game time: 9:00 p.m. EST/8:00 p.m. CST
- Game weather: None (indoor stadium)
- Game attendance: 53,201
- Referee: Dick Hantak
- TV announcers (ABC): Al Michaels, Frank Gifford, Dan Dierdorf and Lynn Swann

Game information

**First quarter**

- No scoring plays.

**Second quarter**

- No scoring plays.

**Third quarter**

- HOU – Billy Joe Tolliver 1-yard run (Al Del Greco kick), 4:44. Oilers 7–0.
- NYG – Mike Sherrard 40-yard pass from Kent Graham (David Treadwell kick), 0:59. Tied 7–7.

**Fourth quarter**

- NYG – David Treadwell 26-yard field goal, 8:19. Giants 10–7.
- HOU – Al Del Greco 43-yard field goal, 4:08. Tied 10–10.
- NYG – David Treadwell 37-yard field goal, 0:02. Giants 13–10.

**Top passers**

- NYG – Kent Graham – 6/13, 105 yards, TD
- HOU – Billy Joe Tolliver – 10/15, 119 yards

**Top rushers**

- NYG – Rodney Hampton – 34 rushes, 122 yards
- HOU – Lorenzo White – 27 rushes, 156 yards

**Top receivers**

- NYG – Mike Sherrard – 6 receptions, 109 yards, TD
- HOU – Lorenzo White – 2 receptions, 49 yards

==== Week 13: at Washington Redskins ====
Week 13: New York Giants at Washington Redskins – Game summary

Quarter	1	2	3	4	Total
**Giants**	7	7	7	0	**21**
Redskins	3	6	3	7	**19**

at RFK Stadium, Washington, D.C.

- Date: November 27
- Game time: 4:00 p.m. EST
- Game weather: Light rain, 39 °F (4 °C)
- Game attendance: 43,384
- Referee: Tom White
- TV announcers (Fox): Joe Buck and Tim Green

Game information

**First quarter**

- WAS – Chip Lohmiller 43-yard field goal, 7:17. Cardinals 3–0.
- NYG – Dave Brown 2-yard run (David Treadwell kick), 2:08. Giants 7–3.

**Second quarter**

- WAS – Chip Lohmiller 29-yard field goal, 10:40. Giants 7–6.
- NYG – Chris Calloway 34-yard pass from Dave Brown (David Treadwell kick), 1:52. Giants 14–6.
- WAS – Chip Lohmiller 29-yard field goal, 0:21. Giants 14–9.

**Third quarter**

- NYG – Mike Sherrard 6-yard pass from Dave Brown (David Treadwell kick), 10:19. Giants 21–9.
- WAS – Chip Lohmiller 46-yard field goal, 7:34. Giants 21–12.

**Fourth quarter**

- WAS – Martin Bayless 60-yard fumble return (Chip Lohmiller kick), 4:44. Giants 21–19.

**Top passers**

- NYG – Dave Brown – 10/17, 161 yards, 2 TD
- WAS – Heath Shuler – 11/28, 165 yards, INT

**Top rushers**

- NYG – Rodney Hampton – 34 rushes, 106 yards
- WAS – Ricky Ervins – 14 rushes, 92 yards

**Top receivers**

- NYG – Chris Calloway – 2 receptions, 47 yards, TD
- WAS – Henry Ellard – 4 receptions, 81 yards

==== Week 14: at Cleveland Browns ====
Week 14: New York Giants at Cleveland Browns – Game summary

Quarter	1	2	3	4	Total
**Giants**	7	0	3	6	**16**
Browns	3	3	0	7	**13**

at Cleveland Municipal Stadium, Cleveland, Ohio

- Date: December 4
- Game time: 4:00 p.m. EST
- Game weather: Overcast, 56 °F (13 °C)
- Game attendance: 72,068
- Referee: Jerry Markbreit
- TV announcers (Fox): Kevin Harlan and Jerry Glanville

Game information

**First quarter**

- CLE – Matt Stover 41-yard field goal, 8:55. Browns 3–0.
- NYG – Aaron Pierce 10-yard pass from Dave Brown (David Treadwell kick), 2:42. Giants 7–3.

**Second quarter**

- CLE – Matt Stover 23-yard field goal, 12:06. Giants 7–6.

**Third quarter**

- NYG – Brad Daluiso 25-yard field goal, 3:24. Giants 10–6.

**Fourth quarter**

- NYG – Brad Daluiso 30-yard field goal, 8:15. Giants 13–6.
- CLE – Leroy Hoard 5-yard run (Matt Stover kick), 4:24. Tied 13–13.
- NYG – Brad Daluiso 33-yard field goal, 0:19. Giants 16–13.

**Top passers**

- NYG – Dave Brown – 17/33, 226 yards, TD, INT
- CLE – Vinny Testaverde – 20/38, 238 yards, 2 INT

**Top rushers**

- NYG – Rodney Hampton – 23 rushes, 77 yards
- CLE – Leroy Hoard – 11 rushes, 45 yards, TD

**Top receivers**

- NYG – Mike Sherrard – 5 receptions, 101 yards
- CLE – Derrick Alexander – 7 receptions, 171 yards

==== Week 15: vs. Cincinnati Bengals ====
Week 15: Cincinnati Bengals at New York Giants – Game summary

Quarter	1	2	3	4	Total
Bengals	0	7	3	10	**20**
**Giants**	0	17	3	7	**27**

at Giants Stadium, East Rutherford, New Jersey

- Date: December 11
- Game time: 1:00 p.m. EST
- Game weather: Cloudy, 45 °F (7 °C)
- Game attendance: 67,530
- Referee: Dale Hamer
- TV announcers (NBC): Marv Albert and Paul Maguire

Game information

**First quarter**

- No scoring plays.

**Second quarter**

- NYG – Rodney Hampton 1-yard run (Brad Daluiso kick), 11:46. Giants 7–0.
- NYG – Brad Daluiso 52-yard field goal, 4:34. Giants 10–0.
- CIN – Carl Pickens 5-yard pass from Jeff Blake (Doug Pelfrey kick), 1:11. Giants 10–7.
- NYG – Howard Cross 8-yard pass from Dave Brown (Brad Daluiso kick), 0:16. Giants 17–7.

**Third quarter**

- CIN – Doug Pelfrey 38-yard field goal, 10:16. Giants 17–10.
- NYG – Brad Daluiso 33-yard field goal, 4:58. Giants 20–10.

**Fourth quarter**

- CIN – Carl Pickens 3-yard pass from Jeff Blake (Doug Pelfrey kick), 9:23. Giants 20–17.
- CIN – Doug Pelfrey 23-yard field goal, 1:47. Tied 20–20.
- NYG – Rodney Hampton 3-yard run (Brad Daluiso kick), 0:40. Giants 27–20.

**Top passers**

- CIN – Jeff Blake – 17/37, 200 yards, 2 TD
- NYG – Dave Brown – 16/26, 222 yards, TD, 2 INT

**Top rushers**

- CIN – Steve Broussard – 13 rushes, 46 yards
- NYG – Rodney Hampton – 23 rushes, 76 yards, 2 TD

**Top receivers**

- CIN – Carl Pickens – 7 receptions, 59 yards, 2 TD
- NYG – Mike Sherrard – 4 receptions, 75 yards

==== Week 16: at Philadelphia Eagles ====
Week 16: New York Giants at Philadelphia Eagles – Game summary

Quarter	1	2	3	4	Total
**Giants**	0	3	3	10	**16**
Eagles	7	3	3	0	**13**

at Veterans Stadium, Philadelphia, Pennsylvania

- Date: December 18
- Game time: 4:00 p.m. EST
- Game weather: Partly sunny, 44 °F (7 °C)
- Game attendance: 64,540
- Referee: Gordon McCarter
- TV announcers (Fox): Pat Summerall and John Madden

Game information

**First quarter**

- PHI – Mark Bavaro 27-yard pass from Bubby Brister (Eddie Murray kick), 2:45. Eagles 7–0.

**Second quarter**

- PHI – Eddie Murray 32-yard field goal, 5:13. Eagles 10–0.
- NYG – Brad Daluiso 47-yard field goal, 0:04. Eagles 10–3.

**Third quarter**

- PHI – Eddie Murray 42-yard field goal, 10:05. Eagles 13–3.
- NYG – Brad Daluiso 19-yard field goal, 1:56. Eagles 13–6.

**Fourth quarter**

- NYG – Dave Meggett 5-yard run (Brad Daluiso kick), 3:54. Tied 13–13.
- NYG – Brad Daluiso 18-yard field goal, 0:54. Giants 16–13.

**Top passers**

- NYG – Dave Brown – 18/27, 264 yards, INT
- PHI – Bubby Brister – 25/39, 182 yards, TD, INT

**Top rushers**

- NYG – Rodney Hampton – 24 rushes, 61 yards
- PHI – Herschel Walker – 4 rushes, 23 yards

**Top receivers**

- NYG – Mike Sherrard – 5 receptions, 81 yards
- PHI – Mark Bavaro – 2 receptions, 45 yards, TD

==== Week 17: vs. Dallas Cowboys ====
Week 17: Dallas Cowboys at New York Giants – Game summary

Quarter	1	2	3	4	Total
Cowboys	3	0	7	0	**10**
**Giants**	0	10	2	3	**15**

at Giants Stadium, East Rutherford, New Jersey

- Date: December 24
- Game time: 1:00 p.m. EST
- Game weather: Overcast, 46 °F (8 °C)
- Game attendance: 66,943
- Referee: Gerry Austin
- TV announcers (Fox): Pat Summerall and John Madden

Game information

**First quarter**

- DAL – Chris Boniol 37-yard field goal, 4:42. Cowboys 3–0.

**Second quarter**

- NYG – Mike Sherrard 49-yard pass from Dave Brown (Brad Daluiso kick), 14:44. Giants 7–3.
- NYG – Brad Daluiso 38-yard field goal, 12:03. Giants 10–3.

**Third quarter**

- DAL – Blair Thomas 1-yard run (Chris Boniol kick), 11:01. Tied 10–10.
- NYG – Rodney Peete fumble out of bounds in end zone for a safety, 4:37. Giants 12–10.

**Fourth quarter**

- NYG – Brad Daluiso 30-yard field goal, 13:55. Giants 15–10.

**Top passers**

- DAL – Troy Aikman – 9/11, 62 yards
- NYG – Dave Brown – 11/19, 141 yards, TD

**Top rushers**

- DAL – Blair Thomas – 18 rushes, 63 yards, TD
- NYG – Rodney Hampton – 26 rushes, 91 yards

**Top receivers**

- DAL – Jay Novacek – 4 receptions, 38 yards
- NYG – Mike Sherrard – 3 receptions, 65 yards, TD

=== Standings ===
NFC East
	W	L	T	PCT	PF	PA	STK
^{(2)} Dallas Cowboys	12	4	0	.750	414	248	L1
New York Giants	9	7	0	.563	279	305	W6
Arizona Cardinals	8	8	0	.500	235	267	L1
Philadelphia Eagles	7	9	0	.438	308	308	L7
Washington Redskins	3	13	0	.188	320	412	W1
