= 1993 New York Giants season =

NFL team season

- Head coach: Dan Reeves
- Offensive coordinator: George Henshaw
- Defensive coordinator: Mike Nolan
- Home stadium: Giants Stadium

Results
- Record: 11–5
- Division place: 2nd NFC East
- Playoffs: Won Wild Card Playoffs (vs. Vikings) 17–10; Lost Divisional Playoffs (at 49ers) 3–44
- Pro Bowlers: 4: C Bart Oates; T Jumbo Elliott; QB Phil Simms; RB Rodney Hampton

The 1993 New York Giants season was the franchise's 69th season in the National Football League (NFL) and the first under head coach Dan Reeves, who was hired by the Giants after being fired by the Denver Broncos in the off-season.

The Giants were looking to improve on their 6–10 mark from the previous year under former head coach Ray Handley and return to the playoffs for the first time since winning Super Bowl XXV in January 1991. Under Reeves’ watch, the Giants did exactly that, finishing with an 11–5 record and qualifying for the playoffs as one of the three Wild Card teams in the NFC. They defeated the Minnesota Vikings at home 17–10, but were soundly defeated by the San Francisco 49ers 44–3 in the Divisional Playoffs.

After the season, star linebacker Lawrence Taylor announced his retirement from football. As Taylor was playing out his final season, another Giants defensive stalwart was entering the league; 1993 saw the debut of Texas Southern defensive end Michael Strahan in the team's lineup.

1993 was also the last season for veteran Giants quarterback Phil Simms; he was released following the season and after entertaining offers to continue his career, Simms elected to retire in 1994.

== Offseason ==
There was some significant roster turnover from 1992. Among the departures were veteran linebackers Carl Banks, who joined the Washington Redskins, and Pepper Johnson, who joined the Cleveland Browns; defensive end Leonard Marshall, who joined the New York Jets; and Super Bowl XXV MVP Ottis Anderson, who retired.

Another major roster turnover move was at the quarterback position. For the last two seasons, as well as the end of the 1990 season, Simms and Jeff Hostetler had each had spells as the starter. Simms' season-ending foot injury in 1990 opened the door for Hostetler to lead the Giants to victory in Super Bowl XXV, and Hostetler had won the starting job for 1991. However, Hostetler went down after suffering a season-ending broken back and Simms was pressed back into service to finish the season. Then, in 1992, Simms suffered another season-ending injury early in the year and Hostetler once again became the starter, only to battle injuries himself in a season where the Giants used four starting quarterbacks. In June of 1993, Reeves decided to release Hostetler and give Simms the starting job permanently.

Additions	Subtractions
LB Michael Brooks (Broncos)	QB Jeff Hostetler (Raiders)
WR Mark Jackson (Broncos)	LB Carl Banks (Redskins)
	LB Pepper Johnson (Browns)
	DE Leonard Marshall (Jets)
	RB Ottis Anderson (retired)
	CB Reyna Thompson (Patriots)
	WR Mark Ingram Sr. (Dolphins)
	DE Eric Dorsey (retired)
	P Sean Landeta (Rams)

=== NFL draft ===
1993 New York Giants draft
Round	Pick	Player	Position	College	Notes
2	40	Michael Strahan * ^{†}	DE	Texas Southern	
3	66	Marcus Buckley	LB	Texas A&M	
4	93	Greg Bishop	T	Pacific	
5	123	Tommy Thigpen	LB	North Carolina	
6	150	Scott Davis	G	Iowa	
7	177	Todd Peterson	K	Georgia	
8	207	Jessie Armstead *	LB	Miami (FL)	
Made roster † Pro Football Hall of Fame * Made at least one Pro Bowl during career

=== Undrafted free agents ===
1993 undrafted free agents of note
Player	Position	College
Hassan Bailey	Defensive back	Kansas
Walter Bailey	Defensive back	Washington
Willie Beamon	Cornerback	Northern Iowa
Steve Brannon	Defensive end	Hampton
Eric Bruun	Punter	Purdue
Keith Crawford	Wide receiver	Howard Payne
Jamie Crysdale	Center	Cincinnati
Tico Duckett	Running back	Michigan State
Brian Fox	Quarterback	Florida
Jerold Jeffcoat	Defensive tackle	Temple
Brian Kozlowski	Tight end	UConn

== Personnel ==
=== Staff ===
1993 New York Giants staff
Head coaches: Head coach – Dan Reeves; Offensive coaches: Offensive coordinator/quarterbacks – George Henshaw; Running backs – George Sefcik; Wide receivers – Dick Rehbein; Tight ends – James Daniel; Offensive line – Pete Mangurian	Defensive coaches: Defensive coordinator – Mike Nolan; Defensive line – Earl Leggett; Linebackers – Don Blackmon; Defensive backs – Zaven Yaralian; Special teams coaches: Special teams – Joe DeCamillis; Strength and conditioning: Strength and conditioning – Al Miller; Asst.strength and conditioning/ offensive quality control – Kerry Goode

=== Roster ===
1993 New York Giants roster
Quarterbacks (QB): 17 Dave Brown; 10 Kent Graham; 11 Phil Simms; Running backs (RB): 33 Jarrod Bunch FB; 27 Rodney Hampton; 30 Dave Meggett; 44 Kenyon Rasheed FB; 34 Lewis Tillman; Wide receivers (WR): 80 Chris Calloway; 85 Keith Crawford; 89 Mark Jackson; 81 Ed McCaffrey; Tight ends (TE): 86 Derek Brown; 87 Howard Cross; 84 Aaron Pierce	Offensive linemen (OL): 78 Greg Bishop G/T; 62 Scott Davis G; 76 Jumbo Elliott T; 68 Clarence Jones T; 61 Bob Kratch G; 60 Eric Moore T; 65 Bart Oates C; 72 Doug Riesenberg T; 66 William Roberts G; 59 Brian Williams C; Defensive linemen (DL): 71 Stacey Dillard NT; 95 Mark Flythe DE; 93 Mike Fox DE; 75 Keith Hamilton DE; 74 Erik Howard NT; 92 Michael Strahan DE	Linebackers (LB): 98 Jessie Armstead OLB; 54 Carlton Bailey ILB; 94 Michael Brooks ILB; 55 Marcus Buckley ILB; 58 Burnell Dent ILB; 96 Kanavis McGhee OLB; 57 Corey Miller OLB; 51 Andre Powell ILB; 56 Lawrence Taylor OLB; 90 Corey Widmer ILB; Defensive backs (DB): 21 Willie Beamon CB; 37 Jesse Campbell SS; 25 Mark Collins CB; 29 Myron Guyton SS; 47 Greg Jackson FS; 24 Izel Jenkins CB; 39 Corey Raymond CB; 22 Phillippi Sparks CB; 49 David Tate FS; Special teams (ST): 3 Brad Daluiso K; 2 Mike Horan P; 18 David Treadwell K	Practice squad: 70 Steve Brannon DE; 82 Kevin Evans WR; 41 Brian Kozlowski TE; 83 Eric Weir WR; Reserve: 88 Mike Sherrard WR (IR); 97 Tommy Thigpen LB (IR); 79 George Thornton NT (NF-Ill.); 23 Perry Williams CB (IR); Rookies in italics 53 active, 4 reserve, 4 practice squad

== Preseason ==
Week	Date	Opponent	Result	Record	Venue
1	August 7	at Cincinnati Bengals	W 27–16	1–0	Riverfront Stadium
2	August 14	Pittsburgh Steelers	L 17–23	1–1	Giants Stadium
3	August 21	New York Jets	W 14–13	2–1	Giants Stadium
4	August 28	at Miami Dolphins	L 17–23	2–2	Joe Robbie Stadium

== Regular season ==
Simms started all 16 games in 1993, being one of only seven quarterbacks to do so, and led the Giants to a resurgent 11–5 season including a victory over the Minnesota Vikings in the playoffs. However, Simms underwent shoulder surgery after the 1993 season to repair a torn labrum. The surgery was successful, and team doctor Russell F. Warren's prognosis for recovery was excellent, and Simms was expected to be ready in time for training camp. However, later during that offseason, Simms was released by the Giants, and subsequently decided to retire. The Giants offense was coming off a sub-par 1992 season, so Dan Reeves and offensive coordinator George Henshaw added and adjusted schemes. The emphasis remained running the ball as the Full House and Power I formations were installed. Rodney Hampton and Phil Simms both made the pro bowl, each the driving force behind the offense. The Defense returned to its dominant ways; allowing an NFL-best 12.8 points per game, or 205 points all year. Lawrence Taylor would join Simms in retirement after the season, ending an era. The Giants finished the 1993 season first in overall defense and rushing offense.

The Giants played the Dolphins in Miami for the first time on December 5, only the fourth meeting between the clubs since the AFL-NFL merger. New York was scheduled to be the opponent for the Dolphins' first regular season game at Joe Robbie Stadium in 1987, but that game was cancelled by a players' strike.

The Giants qualified for the playoffs on December 12 with a win at Giants Stadium against the Colts, 35 years after the two teams met in "The Greatest Game Ever Played". However in week 18, the Cowboys and Giants met in the Meadowlands to conclude the regular season with huge stakes. The winner would win the NFC East and have home-field advantage as the NFC's #1 seed and have a week off, while the loser would have to play an extra week and host a wild card game against the Minnesota Vikings as the NFC's #4 seed. The Giants lost to the Cowboys 16–13 in overtime, making their road to the Super Bowl much harder.

=== Schedule ===
Week	Date	Opponent	Result	Record	Venue	Recap
1	September 5	at Chicago Bears	**W** 26–20	1–0	Soldier Field	Recap
2	September 12	Tampa Bay Buccaneers	**W** 23–7	2–0	Giants Stadium	Recap
3	September 19	Los Angeles Rams	**W** 20–10	3–0	Giants Stadium	Recap
4	Bye					
5	October 3	at Buffalo Bills	**L** 14–17	3–1	Rich Stadium	Recap
6	October 10	at **Washington Redskins**	**W** 41–7	4–1	RFK Stadium	Recap
7	October 17	**Philadelphia Eagles**	**W** 21–10	5–1	Giants Stadium	Recap
8	Bye					
9	October 31	New York Jets	**L** 6–10	5–2	Giants Stadium	Recap
10	November 7	at **Dallas Cowboys**	**L** 9–31	5–3	Texas Stadium	Recap
11	November 14	**Washington Redskins**	**W** 20–6	6–3	Giants Stadium	Recap
12	November 21	at **Philadelphia Eagles**	**W** 7–3	7–3	Veterans Stadium	Recap
13	November 28	**Phoenix Cardinals**	**W** 19–17	8–3	Giants Stadium	Recap
14	December 5	at Miami Dolphins	**W** 19–14	9–3	Joe Robbie Stadium	Recap
15	December 12	Indianapolis Colts	**W** 20–6	10–3	Giants Stadium	Recap
16	December 20	at New Orleans Saints	**W** 24–14	11–3	Louisiana Superdome	Recap
17	December 26	at **Phoenix Cardinals**	**L** 6–17	11–4	Sun Devil Stadium	Recap
18	January 2, 1994	**Dallas Cowboys**	**L** 13–16 (OT)	11–5	Giants Stadium	Recap
Note: Intra-division opponents are in **bold** text.

=== Game summaries ===
==== Week 1: at Chicago Bears ====
Week 1: New York Giants at Chicago Bears – Game summary

Quarter	1	2	3	4	Total
**Giants**	3	6	7	10	**26**
Bears	0	7	10	3	**20**

at Soldier Field, Chicago, Illinois

- Date: September 5
- Game time: 4:00 p.m. EDT/3:00 p.m. CDT
- Game weather: Light rain, 66 °F (19 °C)
- Game attendance: 66,900
- Referee: Dick Hantak
- TV announcers (CBS): Verne Lundquist and John Madden

Game information

**First quarter**

- NYG – David Treadwell 19-yard field goal, 6:50. Giants 3–0.

**Second quarter**

- NYG – David Treadwell 35-yard field goal, 11:33. Giants 6–0.
- NYG – David Treadwell 23-yard field goal, 7:00. Giants 9–0.
- CHI – Terry Obee 2-yard pass from Jim Harbaugh (Kevin Butler kick), 0:03. Giants 9–7.

**Third quarter**

- CHI – Myron Baker 5-yard blocked punt return Kevin Butler kick), 13:55. Bears 14–9.
- CHI – Kevin Butler 20-yard field goal, 8:39. Bears 17–9.
- NYG – Mark Jackson 40-yard pass from Phil Simms (David Treadwell kick), 0:19. Bears 17–16.

**Fourth quarter**

- NYG – David Treadwell 36-yard field goal, 9:44. Giants 19–17.
- CHI – Kevin Butler 34-yard field goal, 3:07. Bears 20–19.
- NYG – Jarrod Bunch 1-yard pass from Phil Simms (David Treadwell kick), 1:07. Giants 26–20.

**Top passers**

- NYG – Phil Simms – 24/34, 277 yards, 2 TD
- CHI – Jim Harbaugh – 16/28, 178 yards, TD, INT

**Top rushers**

- NYG – Rodney Hampton – 22 rushes, 76 yards
- CHI – Craig Heyward – 13 rushes, 51 yards

**Top receivers**

- NYG – Mike Sherrard – 6 receptions, 87 yards
- CHI – Tom Waddle – 3 receptions, 62 yards

==== Week 2: vs. Tampa Bay Buccaneers ====
Week 2: Tampa Bay Buccaneers at New York Giants – Game summary

Quarter	1	2	3	4	Total
Buccaneers	0	7	0	0	**7**
**Giants**	7	10	3	3	**23**

at Giants Stadium, East Rutherford, New Jersey

- Date: September 12
- Game time: 1:00 p.m. EDT
- Game weather: Mostly cloudy, 65 °F (18 °C)
- Game attendance: 75,891
- Referee: Larry Nemmers
- TV announcers (CBS): Sean McDonough and Matt Millen

Game information

**First quarter**

- NYG – Howard Cross 18-yard pass from Phil Simms (David Treadwell kick), 6:48. Giants 7–0.

**Second quarter**

- NYG – Rodney Hampton 2-yard run (David Treadwell kick), 8:26. Giants 14–0.
- TB – Tyji Armstrong 17-yard pass from Craig Erickson (Michael Husted kick), 3:58. Giants 14–7.
- NYG – David Treadwell 33-yard field goal, 0:00. Giants 17–7.

**Third quarter**

- NYG – David Treadwell 22-yard field goal, 9:37. Giants 20–7.

**Fourth quarter**

- NYG – David Treadwell 46-yard field goal, 7:03. Giants 23–7.

**Top passers**

- TB – Craig Erickson – 16/28, 174 yards, TD, INT
- NYG – Phil Simms – 12/26, 204 yards, TD, INT

**Top rushers**

- TB – Reggie Cobb – 16 rushes, 32 yards
- NYG – Rodney Hampton – 29 rushes, 134 yards, TD

**Top receivers**

- TB – Lawrence Dawsey – 4 receptions, 70 yards
- NYG – Mike Sherrard – 4 receptions, 69 yards

==== Week 3: vs. Los Angeles Rams ====
Week 3: Los Angeles Rams at New York Giants – Game summary

Quarter	1	2	3	4	Total
Rams	0	3	0	7	**10**
**Giants**	7	6	7	0	**20**

at Giants Stadium, East Rutherford, New Jersey

- Date: September 19
- Game time: 1:00 p.m. EDT
- Game weather: Scattered clouds, 65 °F (18 °C)
- Game attendance: 76,213
- Referee: Dale Hamer
- TV announcers (CBS): Jim Nantz and Randy Cross

Game information

**First quarter**

- NYG – Rodney Hampton 1-yard run (David Treadwell kick), 9:41. Giants 7–0.

**Second quarter**

- NYG – David Treadwell 34-yard field goal, 9:44. Giants 10–0.
- LA – Tony Zendejas 52-yard field goal, 6:14. Giants 10–3.
- NYG – David Treadwell 19-yard field goal, 0:00. Giants 13–3.

**Third quarter**

- NYG – Mark Collins 50-yard interception return (David Treadwell kick), 4:32. Giants 20–3.

**Fourth quarter**

- LA – Flipper Anderson 51-yard pass from Jim Everett (Tony Zendejas kick), 12:10. Giants 20–10.

**Top passers**

- LA – Jim Everett – 11/28, 135 yards, TD, 2 INT
- NYG – Phil Simms – 21/27, 217 yards

**Top rushers**

- LA – Jerome Bettis – 9 rushes, 33 yards
- NYG – Rodney Hampton – 41 rushes, 134 yards, TD

**Top receivers**

- LA – Flipper Anderson – 3 receptions, 63 yards, TD
- NYG – Mike Sherrard – 7 receptions, 65 yards

==== Week 5: at Buffalo Bills ====
Week 5: New York Giants at Buffalo Bills – Game summary

Quarter	1	2	3	4	Total
Giants	0	14	0	0	**14**
**Bills**	10	0	0	7	**17**

at Rich Stadium, Orchard Park, New York

- Date: October 3
- Game time: 8:00 p.m. EDT
- Game weather: Partly cloudy, 47 °F (8 °C)
- Game attendance: 79,283
- Referee: Gordon McCarter
- TV announcers (TNT): Gary Bender and Pat Haden

Game information

**First quarter**

- BUF – Steve Christie 24-yard field goal, 9:00. Bills 3–0.
- BUF – Henry Jones 85-yard interception return (Steve Christie kick), 4:43. Bills 10–0.

**Second quarter**

- NYG – Chris Calloway 5-yard pass from Phil Simms (David Treadwell kick), 6:15. Bills 10–7.
- NYG – Mark Jackson 3-yard pass from Phil Simms (David Treadwell kick), 0:18. Giants 14–10.

**Third quarter**

- No scoring plays.

**Fourth quarter**

- BUF – Pete Metzelaars 8-yard pass from Jim Kelly (Steve Christie kick), 2:27. Bills 17–14.

**Top passers**

- NYG – Phil Simms – 12/28, 160 yards, 2 TD, 3 INT
- BUF – Jim Kelly – 14/25, 142 yards, TD, INT

**Top rushers**

- NYG – Rodney Hampton – 32 rushes, 86 yards
- BUF – Thurman Thomas – 26 rushes, 122 yards

**Top receivers**

- NYG – Mike Sherrard – 2 receptions, 37 yards
- BUF – Pete Metzelaars – 6 receptions, 44 yards, TD

==== Week 6: at Washington Redskins ====
Week 6: New York Giants at Washington Redskins – Game summary

Quarter	1	2	3	4	Total
**Giants**	7	20	0	14	**41**
Redskins	0	7	0	0	**7**

at RFK Stadium, Washington, D.C.

- Date: October 10
- Game time: 1:00 p.m. EDT
- Game weather: Partly cloudy, 57 °F (14 °C)
- Game attendance: 53,715
- Referee: Red Cashion
- TV announcers (CBS): Pat Summerall and John Madden

Game information

**First quarter**

- NYG – Lewis Tillman 3-yard run (David Treadwell kick), 4:18. Giants 7–0.

**Second quarter**

- NYG – Howard Cross 7-yard pass from Phil Simms (kick failed), 9:43. Giants 13–0.
- NYG – Mike Sherrard 42-yard pass from Dave Meggett (David Treadwell kick), 8:14. Giants 20–0.
- NYG – Howard Cross 17-yard pass from Phil Simms (David Treadwell kick), 1:55. Giants 27–0.
- WAS – Tim McGee 12-yard pass from Mark Rypien (Chip Lohmiller kick), 0:53. Giants 27–7.

**Third quarter**

- No scoring plays.

**Fourth quarter**

- NYG – Mike Sherrard 55-yard pass from Phil Simms (David Treadwell kick), 10:20. Giants 34–7.
- NYG – Kenyon Rasheed 23-yard run (David Treadwell kick), 3:25. Giants 41–7.

**Top passers**

- NYG – Phil Simms – 14/17, 182 yards, 3 TD
- WAS – Mark Rypien – 21/35, 220 yards, TD, INT

**Top rushers**

- NYG – Lewis Tillman – 29 rushes, 104 yards, TD
- WAS – Ricky Ervins – 2 rushes, 23 yards

**Top receivers**

- NYG – Mike Sherrard – 4 receptions, 124 yards, 2 TD
- WAS – Tim McGee – 6 receptions, 72 yards, TD

==== Week 7: vs. Philadelphia Eagles ====
Week 7: Philadelphia Eagles at New York Giants – Game summary

Quarter	1	2	3	4	Total
Eagles	0	3	0	7	**10**
**Giants**	0	14	0	7	**21**

at Giants Stadium, East Rutherford, New Jersey

- Date: October 17
- Game time: 1:00 p.m. EDT
- Game weather: Overcast, 60 °F (16 °C)
- Game attendance: 76,050
- Referee: Bernie Kukar
- TV announcers (CBS): Verne Lundquist and Dan Fouts

Game information

**First quarter**

- No scoring plays.

**Second quarter**

- PHI – Matt Bahr 47-yard field goal, 14:52. Eagles 3–0.
- NYG – Ed McCaffrey 17-yard pass from Phil Simms (David Treadwell kick), 10:07. Giants 7–3.
- NYG – Lewis Tillman 1-yard run (David Treadwell kick), 3:53. Giants 14–3.

**Third quarter**

- No scoring plays.

**Fourth quarter**

- NYG – Lewis Tillman 10-yard run (David Treadwell kick), 10:07. Giants 21–3.
- PHI – Mark Bavaro 13-yard pass from Ken O'Brien (Matt Bahr kick), 5:56. Giants 21–10.

**Top passers**

- PHI – Ken O'Brien – 19/32, 210 yards, TD, INT
- NYG – Phil Simms – 11/22, 148 yards, TD, 2 INT

**Top rushers**

- PHI – Herschel Walker – 15 rushes, 58 yards
- NYG – Lewis Tillman – 20 rushes, 169 yards, 2 TD

**Top receivers**

- PHI – Mark Bavaro – 5 receptions, 69 yards, TD
- NYG – Mike Sherrard – 1 reception, 51 yards

==== Week 9: vs. New York Jets ====
Week 9: New York Jets at New York Giants – Game summary

Quarter	1	2	3	4	Total
**Jets**	0	3	7	0	**10**
Giants	3	3	0	0	**6**

at Giants Stadium, East Rutherford, New Jersey

- Date: October 31
- Game time: 1:00 p.m. EST
- Game weather: Overcast, 44 °F (7 °C)
- Game attendance: 71,659
- Referee: Gerry Austin
- TV announcers (NBC): Marv Albert and Paul Maguire

Game information

**First quarter**

- NYG – David Treadwell 28-yard field goal, 0:29. Giants 3–0.

**Second quarter**

- NYJ – Cary Blanchard 21-yard field goal, 9:05. Tied 3–3.
- NYG – David Treadwell 23-yard field goal, 1:37. Giants 6–3.

**Third quarter**

- NYJ – Brad Baxter 2-yard run (Cary Blanchard kick), 2:04. Jets 10–6.

**Fourth quarter**

- No scoring plays.

**Top passers**

- NYJ – Boomer Esiason – 12/17, 129 yards,
- NYG – Phil Simms – 20/30, 142 yards, INT

**Top rushers**

- NYJ – Brad Baxter – 19 rushes, 71 yards, TD
- NYG – Lewis Tillman – 17 rushes, 70 yards

**Top receivers**

- NYJ – Johnny Johnson – 7 receptions, 69 yards
- NYG – Mark Jackson – 6 receptions, 76 yards

==== Week 10: at Dallas Cowboys ====
Week 10: New York Giants at Dallas Cowboys – Game summary

Quarter	1	2	3	4	Total
Giants	0	6	0	3	**9**
**Cowboys**	10	7	0	14	**31**

at Texas Stadium, Irving, Texas

- Date: November 7
- Game time: 1:00 p.m. EST/12:00 p.m. CST
- Game weather: Cloudy, 41 °F (5 °C)
- Game attendance: 64,735
- Referee: Dick Hantak
- TV announcers (CBS): Pat Summerall and John Madden

Game information

**First quarter**

- DAL – Eddie Murray 34-yard field goal, 7:23. Cowboys 3–0.
- DAL – Alvin Harper 28-yard pass from Troy Aikman (Eddie Murray kick), 2:05. Cowboys 10–0.

**Second quarter**

- NYG – David Treadwell 22-yard field goal, 11:07. Cowboys 10–3.
- DAL – Alvin Harper 50-yard pass from Troy Aikman (Eddie Murray kick), 10:48. Cowboys 17–3.
- NYG – David Treadwell 45-yard field goal, 6:39. Cowboys 17–6.

**Third quarter**

- No scoring plays.

**Fourth quarter**

- DAL – Emmitt Smith 1-yard run (Eddie Murray kick), 11:22. Cowboys 24–6.
- DAL – Emmitt Smith 2-yard run (Eddie Murray kick), 9:02. Cowboys 31–6.
- NYG – David Treadwell 29-yard field goal, 3:31. Cowboys 31–9.

**Top passers**

- NYG – Phil Simms – 12/21, 155 yards
- DAL – Troy Aikman – 11/13, 162 yards, 2 TD

**Top rushers**

- NYG – Lewis Tillman – 20 rushes, 82 yards
- DAL – Emmitt Smith – 24 rushes, 117 yards, 2 TD

**Top receivers**

- NYG – Chris Calloway – 4 receptions, 87 yards
- DAL – Alvin Harper – 3 receptions, 90 yards, 2 TD

==== Week 11: vs. Washington Redskins ====
Week 11: Washington Redskins at New York Giants – Game summary

Quarter	1	2	3	4	Total
Redskins	0	0	3	3	**6**
**Giants**	7	7	3	3	**20**

at Giants Stadium, East Rutherford, New Jersey

- Date: November 14
- Game time: 1:00 p.m. EST
- Game weather: Overcast, 60 °F (16 °C)
- Game attendance: 76,606
- Referee: Bob McElwee
- TV announcers (CBS): Pat Summerall and John Madden

Game information

**First quarter**

- NYG – Rodney Hampton 1-yard run (David Treadwell kick), 7:16. Giants 7–0.

**Second quarter**

- NYG – Chris Calloway 21-yard pass from Dave Meggett (David Treadwell kick), 4:59. Giants 14–0.

**Third quarter**

- NYG – David Treadwell 43-yard field goal, 5:25. Giants 17–0.
- WAS – Chip Lohmiller 27-yard field goal, 0:39. Giants 17–3.

**Fourth quarter**

- NYG – David Treadwell 39-yard field goal, 6:23. Giants 20–3.
- WAS – Chip Lohmiller 33-yard field goal, 3:41. Giants 20–6.

**Top passers**

- WAS – Mark Rypien – 22/49, 239 yards, INT
- NYG – Phil Simms – 8/15, 100 yards, INT

**Top rushers**

- WAS – Reggie Brooks – 22 rushes, 91 yards
- NYG – Rodney Hampton – 24 rushes, 78 yards, TD

**Top receivers**

- WAS – Ricky Sanders – 8 receptions, 91 yards
- NYG – Mark Jackson – 5 receptions, 61 yards

==== Week 12: at Philadelphia Eagles ====
Week 12: New York Giants at Philadelphia Eagles – Game summary

Quarter	1	2	3	4	Total
**Giants**	0	0	0	7	**7**
Eagles	0	0	3	0	**3**

at Veterans Stadium, Philadelphia, Pennsylvania

- Date: November 21
- Game time: 4:00 p.m. EST
- Game weather: Partly sunny, 40 °F (4 °C)
- Game attendance: 62,928
- Referee: Ed Hochuli
- TV announcers (CBS): Pat Summerall and John Madden

Game information

**First quarter**

- No scoring plays.

**Second quarter**

- No scoring plays.

**Third quarter**

- PHI – Matt Bahr 35-yard field goal, 7:03. Eagles 3–0.

**Fourth quarter**

- NYG – Mark Jackson 26-yard pass from Phil Simms (David Treadwell kick), 14:55. Giants 7–3.

**Top passers**

- NYG – Phil Simms – 13/22, 187 yards, TD, INT
- PHI – Bubby Brister – 9/20, 94 yards

**Top rushers**

- NYG – Rodney Hampton – 24 rushes, 101 yards
- PHI – Herschel Walker – 14 rushes, 80 yards

**Top receivers**

- NYG – Mark Jackson – 5 receptions, 61 yards, TD
- PHI – Victor Bailey – 3 receptions, 54 yards

==== Week 13: vs. Arizona Cardinals ====
Week 13: Arizona Cardinals at New York Giants – Game summary

Quarter	1	2	3	4	Total
Cardinals	10	0	7	0	**17**
**Giants**	3	3	7	6	**19**

at Giants Stadium, East Rutherford, New Jersey

- Date: November 28
- Game time: 4:00 p.m. EST
- Game weather: Mostly sunny, 60 °F (16 °C)
- Game attendance: 59,979
- Referee: Tom White
- TV announcers (CBS): Verne Lundquist and Dan Fouts

Game information

**First quarter**

- PHO – Greg Davis 47-yard field goal, 12:45. Cardinals 3–0.
- PHO – Butch Rolle 1-yard pass from Steve Beuerlein (Greg Davis kick), 2:19. Cardinals 10–0.
- NYG – David Treadwell 22-yard field goal, 0:04. Cardinals 10–3.

**Second quarter**

- NYG – David Treadwell 37-yard field goal, 1:55. Cardinals 10–6.

**Third quarter**

- NYG – Ed McCaffrey 20-yard pass from Phil Simms (David Treadwell kick), 7:40. Giants 13–10.
- PHO – Ricky Proehl 17-yard pass from Steve Beuerlein (Greg Davis kick), 2:24. Cardinals 17–13.

**Fourth quarter**

- NYG – David Treadwell 22-yard field goal, 12:56. Cardinals 17–16.
- NYG – Brad Daluiso 54-yard field goal, 0:32. Giants 19–17.

**Top passers**

- PHO – Steve Beuerlein – 19/33, 193 yards, 2 TD, INT
- NYG – Phil Simms – 22/41, 337 yards, TD

**Top rushers**

- PHO – Ronald Moore – 17 rushes, 53 yards
- NYG – Rodney Hampton – 11 rushes, 18 yards

**Top receivers**

- PHO – Ricky Proehl – 6 receptions, 81 yards
- NYG – Mark Jackson – 7 receptions, 113 yards

==== Week 14: at Miami Dolphins ====
Week 14: New York Giants at Miami Dolphins – Game summary

Quarter	1	2	3	4	Total
**Giants**	7	7	3	2	**19**
Dolphins	7	0	0	7	**14**

at Joe Robbie Stadium, Miami Gardens, Florida

- Date: December 5
- Game time: 4:00 p.m. EST
- Game weather: Scattered clouds, 74 °F (23 °C)
- Game attendance: 72,161
- Referee: Gary Lane
- TV announcers (CBS): Pat Summerall and John Madden

Game information

**First quarter**

- NYG – Rodney Hampton 14-yard run (David Treadwell kick), 9:19. Giants 7–0.
- MIA – Keith Byars 6-yard run (Pete Stoyanovich kick), 6:13. Tied 7–7.

**Second quarter**

- NYG – Howard Cross 20-yard pass from Phil Simms (David Treadwell kick), 1:12. Giants 14–7.

**Third quarter**

- NYG – David Treadwell 42-yard field goal, 6:04. Giants 17–7.

**Fourth quarter**

- NYG – Steve DeBerg tackled in end zone by Keith Hamilton for a safety, 5:19. Giants 19–7.
- MIA – Tony Martin 25-yard pass from Steve DeBerg (Pete Stoyanovich kick), 1:01. Giants 19–14.

**Top passers**

- NYG – Phil Simms – 17/24, 257 yards, TD
- MIA – Steve DeBerg – 26/41, 365 yards, TD, 2 INT

**Top rushers**

- NYG – Rodney Hampton – 12 rushes, 60 yards, TD
- MIA – Terry Kirby – 5 rushes, 18 yards

**Top receivers**

- NYG – Aaron Pierce – 3 receptions, 98 yards
- MIA – Terry Kirby – 8 receptions, 95 yards

==== Week 15: vs. Indianapolis Colts ====
Week 15: Indianapolis Colts at New York Giants – Game summary

Quarter	1	2	3	4	Total
Colts	0	6	0	0	**6**
**Giants**	7	6	0	7	**20**

at Giants Stadium, East Rutherford, New Jersey

- Date: December 12
- Game time: 1:00 p.m. EST
- Game weather: Mostly sunny, 28 °F (−2 °C)
- Game attendance: 70,411
- Referee: Larry Nemmers
- TV announcers (NBC): Don Criqui, Beasley Reece and O. J. Simpson

Game information

**First quarter**

- NYG – Rodney Hampton 1-yard run (David Treadwell kick), 7:46. Giants 7–0.

**Second quarter**

- NYG – Chris Calloway 17-yard pass from Phil Simms (kick aborted), 14:15. Giants 13–0.
- IND – Dean Biasucci 21-yard field goal, 10:51. Giants 13–3.
- IND – Dean Biasucci 26-yard field goal, 1:15. Giants 13–6.

**Third quarter**

- No scoring plays.

**Fourth quarter**

- NYG – Jarrod Bunch 2-yard run (David Treadwell kick), 14:57. Giants 20–6.

**Top passers**

- IND – Jeff George – 22/38, 254 yards
- NYG – Phil Simms – 9/15, 85 yards, TD

**Top rushers**

- IND – Roosevelt Potts – 10 rushes, 33 yards
- NYG – Rodney Hampton – 33 rushes, 173 yards, TD

**Top receivers**

- IND – Jessie Hester – 2 receptions, 75 yards
- NYG – Chris Calloway – 2 receptions, 30 yards, TD

==== Week 16: at New Orleans Saints ====
Week 16: New York Giants at New Orleans Saints – Game summary

Quarter	1	2	3	4	Total
**Giants**	7	7	3	7	**24**
Saints	0	7	0	7	**14**

at Louisiana Superdome, New Orleans, Louisiana

- Date: December 20
- Game time: 9:00 p.m. EST/8:00 p.m. CST
- Game weather: None (indoor stadium)
- Game attendance: 69,036
- Referee: Johnny Grier
- TV announcers (ABC): Al Michaels, Frank Gifford and Dan Dierdorf

Game information

**First quarter**

- NYG – Mark Jackson 9-yard pass from Phil Simms (David Treadwell kick), 4:45. Giants 7–0.

**Second quarter**

- NYG – Howard Cross 17-yard pass from Phil Simms (David Treadwell kick), 7:47. Giants 14–0.
- NO – Brad Muster 1-yard run (Morten Andersen kick), 1:56. Giants 14–7.

**Third quarter**

- NYG – David Treadwell 22-yard field goal, 2:48. Giants 17–7.

**Fourth quarter**

- NYG – Dave Meggett 75-yard punt return (David Treadwell kick), 11:13. Giants 24–7.
- NO – Dalton Hilliard 5-yard pass from Mike Buck (Morten Andersen kick), 1:40. Giants 24–14.

**Top passers**

- NYG – Phil Simms – 15/23, 166 yards, 2 TD
- NO – Mike Buck – 11/21, 148 yards, TD, 2 INT

**Top rushers**

- NYG – Rodney Hampton – 19 rushes, 65 yards
- NO – Derek Brown – 6 rushes, 9 yards

**Top receivers**

- NYG – Mark Jackson – 5 receptions, 44 yards
- NO – Quinn Early – 4 receptions, 98 yards

==== Week 17: at Phoenix Cardinals ====
Week 17: New York Giants at Phoenix Cardinals – Game summary

Quarter	1	2	3	4	Total
Giants	3	3	0	0	**6**
**Cardinals**	0	0	10	7	**17**

at Sun Devil Stadium, Tempe, Arizona

- Date: December 26
- Game time: 4:00 p.m. EST/2:00 p.m. MST
- Game weather: Overcast, 57 °F (14 °C)
- Game attendance: 53,414
- Referee: Bernie Kukar
- TV announcers (CBS): Pat Summerall and John Madden

Game information

**First quarter**

- NYG – David Treadwell 19-yard field goal, 6:48. Giants 3–0.

**Second quarter**

- NYG – David Treadwell 22-yard field goal, 12:55. Giants 6–0.

**Third quarter**

- PHO – Greg Davis 20-yard field goal, 6:12. Giants 6–3.
- PHO – Ronald Moore 19-yard run (Greg Davis kick), 2:01. Cardinals 10–6.

**Fourth quarter**

- PHO – Ronald Moore 1-yard run (Greg Davis kick), 12:09. Cardinals 17–6.

**Top passers**

- NYG – Phil Simms – 21/30, 214 yards
- PHO – Steve Beuerlein – 15/24, 198 yards, 2 INT

**Top rushers**

- NYG – Rodney Hampton – 15 rushes, 38 yards
- PHO – Ronald Moore – 23 rushes, 135 yards, 2 TD

**Top receivers**

- NYG – Chris Calloway – 6 receptions, 69 yards
- PHO – Larry Centers – 5 receptions, 84 yards

==== Week 18: vs. Dallas Cowboys ====
Week 18: Dallas Cowboys at New York Giants – Game summary

Quarter	1	2	3	4	OT	Total
**Cowboys**	3	10	0	0	3	**16**
Giants	0	0	10	3	0	**13**

at Giants Stadium, East Rutherford, New Jersey

- Date: January 2
- Game time: 1:00 p.m. EST
- Game weather: Cloudy, 41 °F (5 °C)
- Game attendance: 77,356
- Referee: Jerry Markbreit
- TV announcers (CBS): Pat Summerall and John Madden

Game information

**First quarter**

- DAL – Eddie Murray 32-yard field goal, 4:37. Cowboys 3–0.

**Second quarter**

- DAL – Emmitt Smith 5-yard pass from Troy Aikman (Eddie Murray kick), 7:26. Cowboys 10–0.
- DAL – Eddie Murray 38-yard field goal, 0:00. Cowboys 13–0.

**Third quarter**

- NYG – Jarrod Bunch 1-yard run (David Treadwell kick), 7:42. Cowboys 13–7.
- NYG – David Treadwell 29-yard field goal, 1:20. Cowboys 13–10.

**Fourth quarter**

- NYG – David Treadwell 32-yard field goal, 0:10. Tied 13–13.

**Overtime**

- DAL – Eddie Murray 41-yard field goal, 4:16. Cowboys 16–13.

**Top passers**

- DAL – Troy Aikman – 24/30, 180 yards, TD
- NYG – Phil Simms – 16/25, 207 yards

**Top rushers**

- DAL – Emmitt Smith – 32 rushes, 168 yards
- NYG – Rodney Hampton – 30 rushes, 114 yards

**Top receivers**

- DAL – Emmitt Smith – 10 reception, 61 yards, TD
- NYG – Chris Calloway – 6 receptions, 58 yards

=== Standings ===
NFC East
	W	L	T	PCT	PF	PA	STK
^{(1)} Dallas Cowboys	12	4	0	.750	376	229	W5
^{(4)} New York Giants	11	5	0	.688	288	205	L2
Philadelphia Eagles	8	8	0	.500	293	315	W3
Phoenix Cardinals	7	9	0	.438	326	269	W3
Washington Redskins	4	12	0	.250	230	345	L2

== Postseason ==
Round	Date	Opponent	Result	Record	Venue	Recap
Wild Card	January 9	Minnesota Vikings (5)	W 17–10	1–0	Giants Stadium	Recap
Divisional Round	January 15	at San Francisco 49ers (2)	L 3–44	1–1	Candlestick Park	Recap

=== Game summaries ===
==== NFC Wild Card Playoffs: vs. (5) Minnesota Vikings ====
NFC Wild Card Playoffs: (5) Minnesota Vikings at (4) New York Giants – Game summary

Quarter	1	2	3	4	Total
Vikings	0	10	0	0	10
Giants	3	0	14	0	17

at Giants Stadium, East Rutherford, New Jersey

- Date: January 9
- Game time: 12:30 p.m. EST
- Game weather: Sunny, 20 °F (−7 °C)
- Game attendance: 75,089
- Referee: Ed Hochuli
- TV announcers (CBS): Pat Summerall and John Madden

Game information

First quarter

- NYG – David Treadwell 26-yard field goal, 8:35. Giants 3–0.

Second quarter

- MIN – Cris Carter 40-yard pass from Jim McMahon (Fuad Reveiz kick), 1:53. Vikings 7–3.
- MIN – Fuad Reveiz 52-yard field goal, 0:02. Vikings 10–3.

Third quarter

- NYG – Rodney Hampton 51-yard run (David Treadwell kick), 12:06. Tied 10–10.
- NYG – Rodney Hampton 2-yard run (David Treadwell kick), 5:37. Giants 17–10.

Fourth quarter

- No scoring plays.

Top passers

- MIN – Jim McMahon – 12/25, 145 yards, TD
- NYG – Phil Simms – 17/26, 94 yards

Top rushers

- MIN – Scottie Graham – 19 rushes, 69 yards
- NYG – Rodney Hampton – 33 rushes, 161 yards, 2 TD

Top receivers

- MIN – Cris Carter – 4 reception, 83 yards, TD
- NYG – Chris Calloway – 2 receptions, 30 yards

A howling, gusting wind dominated the game as both teams could only score with the wind. However, the Giants managed to score two touchdowns, both by running back Rodney Hampton in the third quarter, to pull ahead for good.

This was both the first playoff game and the first playoff win for the Giants since Super Bowl XXV.

==== NFC Divisional Round: at (2) San Francisco 49ers ====
NFC Divisional Round: (4) New York Giants at (2) San Francisco 49ers – Game summary

Quarter	1	2	3	4	Total
Giants	0	3	0	0	3
49ers	9	14	14	7	44

at Candlestick Park, San Francisco, California

- Date: January 15
- Game time: 4:00 p.m. EST/1:00 p.m. PST
- Game weather: Partly cloudy, 49 °F (9 °C)
- Game attendance: 67,143
- Referee: Bernie Kukar
- TV announcers (CBS): Pat Summerall and John Madden

Game information

First quarter

- SF – Ricky Watters 1-yard run (kick failed), 10:33. 49ers 6–0.
- SF – Mike Cofer 29-yard field goal, 4:53. 49ers 9–0.

Second quarter

- SF – Ricky Watters 1-yard run (Mike Cofer kick), 14:58. 49ers 16–0.
- SF – Ricky Watters 2-yard run (Mike Cofer kick), 4:03. 49ers 23–0.
- NYG – David Treadwell 25-yard field goal, 0:00. 49ers 23–3.

Third quarter

- SF – Ricky Watters 6-yard run (Mike Cofer kick), 7:38. 49ers 30–3.
- SF – Ricky Watters 2-yard run (Mike Cofer kick), 1:09. 49ers 37–3.

Fourth quarter

- SF – Marc Logan 2-yard run (Mike Cofer kick), 12:26. 49ers 44–3.

Top passers

- NYG – Phil Simms – 12/25, 124 yards, 2 INT
- SF – Steve Young – 17/22, 226 yards

Top rushers

- NYG – Rodney Hampton – 7 rushes, 12 yards
- SF – Ricky Watters – 24 rushes, 118 yards, 5 TD

Top receivers

- NYG – Ed McCaffrey – 5 receptions, 59 yards
- SF – John Taylor – 2 receptions, 74 yards

49ers running back Ricky Watters rushed for 118 yards, caught 5 passes for 46 yards, and scored an NFL playoff record 5 touchdowns as San Francisco crushed the Giants, 44–3. This was the final NFL game for both Giants legends Lawrence Taylor and Phil Simms.

== See also ==
- List of New York Giants seasons
