= List of NFL Coach of the Year awards =

The NFL Coach of the Year Award is presented annually by various news and sports organizations to the National Football League (NFL) head coach who has done the most outstanding job of working with the talent he has at his disposal. Currently, the most widely recognized award is presented by the Associated Press (AP), although in the past several awards received press recognition. First presented in 1957, the AP award also gave out an award to coaches of the American Football League (AFL) from 1961 to 1969. The Sporting News has given a pro football coach of the year award since 1947 and in 1949 gave its award to a non-NFL coach, Paul Brown of the All-America Football Conference's Cleveland Browns. Other NFL Coach of the Year awards are presented by Pro Football Weekly/Pro Football Writers of America and the Maxwell Football Club. The United Press International (UPI) NFL Coach of the Year award was first presented in 1955. From 1960 to 1969, before the AFL–NFL merger, an award was also given to the most outstanding coach from the AFL. When the leagues merged in 1970, separate awards were given to the best coaches from the American Football Conference (AFC) and National Football Conference (NFC). The UPI discontinued the awards after 1996.

== AP NFL Coach of the Year ==
**Bold**	Denotes team won the Super Bowl/NFL Championship that season
Italic	Denotes first year head coach of that team
*	Denotes interim coach
†	Member of the Pro Football Hall of Fame as a head coach

Season	Coach	Team	Record
1957	George Wilson	**Detroit Lions**	8–4
1958	Weeb Ewbank^{†}	**Baltimore Colts**	9–3
1959	Vince Lombardi^{†}	Green Bay Packers	7–5
1960	Buck Shaw	**Philadelphia Eagles**	10–2
1961	Allie Sherman	New York Giants	10–3–1
1962	Allie Sherman (2)	New York Giants	12–2
1963	George Halas^{†}	**Chicago Bears**	11–1–2
1964	Don Shula^{†}	Baltimore Colts	12–2
1965	George Halas^{†}(2)	Chicago Bears	9–5
1966	Tom Landry^{†}	Dallas Cowboys	10–3–1
1967	George Allen^{†} Don Shula^{†}(2) (tie)	Los Angeles Rams; Baltimore Colts	11–1–2; 11–1–2
1968	Don Shula^{†}(3)	**Baltimore Colts**	13–1
1969	Bud Grant^{†}	**Minnesota Vikings**	12–2
1970	Paul Brown^{†}	Cincinnati Bengals	8–6
1971	George Allen^{†}(2)	Washington Redskins	9–4–1
1972	Don Shula^{†}(4)	**Miami Dolphins**	14–0
1973	Chuck Knox	Los Angeles Rams	12–2
1974	Don Coryell^{†}	St. Louis Cardinals	10–4
1975	Ted Marchibroda	Baltimore Colts	10–4
1976	Forrest Gregg	Cleveland Browns	9–5
1977	Red Miller	Denver Broncos	12–2
1978	Jack Patera	Seattle Seahawks	9–7
1979	Jack Pardee	Washington Redskins	10–6
1980	Chuck Knox (2)	Buffalo Bills	11–5
1981	Bill Walsh^{†}	**San Francisco 49ers**	13–3
1982	Joe Gibbs^{†}	**Washington Redskins**	8–1
1983	Joe Gibbs^{†}(2)	Washington Redskins	14–2
1984	Chuck Knox (3)	Seattle Seahawks	12–4
1985	Mike Ditka	**Chicago Bears**	15–1
1986	Bill Parcells^{†}	**New York Giants**	14–2
1987	Jim Mora	New Orleans Saints	12–3
1988	Mike Ditka (2)	Chicago Bears	12–4
1989	Lindy Infante	Green Bay Packers	10–6
1990	Jimmy Johnson^{†}	Dallas Cowboys	7–9
1991	Wayne Fontes	Detroit Lions	12–4
1992	Bill Cowher^{†}	Pittsburgh Steelers	11–5
1993	Dan Reeves	New York Giants	11–5
1994	Bill Parcells^{†}(2)	New England Patriots	10–6
1995	Ray Rhodes	Philadelphia Eagles	10–6
1996	Dom Capers	Carolina Panthers	12–4
1997	Jim Fassel	New York Giants	10–5–1
1998	Dan Reeves (2)	Atlanta Falcons	14–2
1999	Dick Vermeil^{†}	**St. Louis Rams**	13–3
2000	Jim Haslett	New Orleans Saints	10–6
2001	Dick Jauron	Chicago Bears	13–3
2002	Andy Reid	Philadelphia Eagles	12–4
2003	Bill Belichick	**New England Patriots**	14–2
2004	Marty Schottenheimer	San Diego Chargers	12–4
2005	Lovie Smith	Chicago Bears	11–5
2006	Sean Payton	New Orleans Saints	10–6
2007	Bill Belichick (2)	New England Patriots	16–0
2008	Mike Smith	Atlanta Falcons	11–5
2009	Marvin Lewis	Cincinnati Bengals	10–6
2010	Bill Belichick (3)	New England Patriots	14–2
2011	Jim Harbaugh	San Francisco 49ers	13–3
2012	Bruce Arians*	Indianapolis Colts	11–5
2013	Ron Rivera	Carolina Panthers	12–4
2014	Bruce Arians (2)	Arizona Cardinals	11–5
2015	Ron Rivera (2)	Carolina Panthers	15–1
2016	Jason Garrett	Dallas Cowboys	13–3
2017	Sean McVay	Los Angeles Rams	11–5
2018	Matt Nagy	Chicago Bears	12–4
2019	John Harbaugh	Baltimore Ravens	14–2
2020	Kevin Stefanski	Cleveland Browns	11–5
2021	Mike Vrabel	Tennessee Titans	12–5
2022	Brian Daboll	New York Giants	9–7–1
2023	Kevin Stefanski (2)	Cleveland Browns	11–6
2024	Kevin O'Connell	Minnesota Vikings	14–3
2025	Mike Vrabel (2)	New England Patriots	14–3

== The Sporting News NFL Coach of the Year ==
Year	NFL Coach	Team
1947	Jimmy Conzelman	Chicago Cardinals
1948	Greasy Neale	Philadelphia Eagles
1949	Paul Brown	Cleveland Browns
1950	Steve Owen	New York Giants
1951	Paul Brown (2)	Cleveland Browns
1952	J. Hampton Pool	Los Angeles Rams
1953	Paul Brown (3)	Cleveland Browns
1954	No award	
1955	Joe Kuharich	Washington Redskins
1956	Jim Lee Howell	New York Giants
1957	No award	
1958	No award	
1959	No award	
1960	No award	
1961	Vince Lombardi	Green Bay Packers
1962	No award	
1963	George Halas	Chicago Bears
1964	Don Shula	Baltimore Colts
1965	George Halas (2)	Chicago Bears
1966	Tom Landry	Dallas Cowboys
1967	George Allen	Los Angeles Rams
1968	Don Shula (2)	Baltimore Colts
1969	Bud Grant	Minnesota Vikings
1970	Don Shula (3)	Miami Dolphins
1971	George Allen (2)	Washington Redskins
1972	Don Shula (4)	Miami Dolphins
1973	Chuck Knox	Los Angeles Rams
1974	Don Coryell	St. Louis Cardinals
1975	Ted Marchibroda	Baltimore Colts
1976	Chuck Fairbanks	New England Patriots
1977	Red Miller	Denver Broncos
1978	Jack Patera	Seattle Seahawks
1979	Dick Vermeil	Philadelphia Eagles
1980	Chuck Knox (2)	Buffalo Bills
1981	Bill Walsh	San Francisco 49ers
1982	Joe Gibbs	Washington Redskins
1983	Joe Gibbs (2)	Washington Redskins
1984	Chuck Knox (3)	Seattle Seahawks
1985	Mike Ditka	Chicago Bears
1986	Bill Parcells	New York Giants
1987	Jim Mora	New Orleans Saints
1988	Marv Levy	Buffalo Bills
1989	Lindy Infante	Green Bay Packers
1990	George Seifert	San Francisco 49ers
1991	Joe Gibbs (3)	Washington Redskins
1992	Bill Cowher	Pittsburgh Steelers
1993	Dan Reeves	New York Giants
1994	George Seifert (2)	San Francisco 49ers
1995	Ray Rhodes	Philadelphia Eagles
1996	Dom Capers	Carolina Panthers
1997	Jim Fassel	New York Giants
1998	Dan Reeves (2)	Atlanta Falcons
1999	Dick Vermeil (2)	St. Louis Rams
2000	Andy Reid	Philadelphia Eagles
2001	Dick Jauron	Chicago Bears
2002	Andy Reid (2)	Philadelphia Eagles
2003	Bill Belichick	New England Patriots
2004	Bill Cowher (2)	Pittsburgh Steelers
2005	Tony Dungy	Indianapolis Colts
2006	Sean Payton	New Orleans Saints
2007	Bill Belichick (2)	New England Patriots
2008	Mike Smith	Atlanta Falcons
2009	Sean Payton (2)	New Orleans Saints
2010	Mike Smith (2)	Atlanta Falcons
2011	Jim Harbaugh	San Francisco 49ers
2012	Mike Smith (3)	Atlanta Falcons
2013	Ron Rivera	Carolina Panthers
2014	Bruce Arians	Arizona Cardinals
2015	Ron Rivera (2)	Carolina Panthers
2016	Jason Garrett	Dallas Cowboys
2017	Sean McVay	Los Angeles Rams
2018	Andy Reid (3)	Kansas City Chiefs
2019	Kyle Shanahan	San Francisco 49ers
2020	Kevin Stefanski	Cleveland Browns
2021	Mike Vrabel	Tennessee Titans
2022	Brian Daboll	New York Giants
2023	Dan Campbell	Detroit Lions
2024	Kevin O'Connell	Minnesota Vikings
2025	Mike Vrabel (2)	New England Patriots

== Pro Football Weekly NFL Coach of the Year ==
Year	NFL Coach	Team
1968	AFL – Hank Stram; NFL – Don Shula	Kansas City Chiefs; Baltimore Colts
1969	AFL – John Madden; NFL – Bud Grant	Oakland Raiders; Minnesota Vikings
1970	Don Shula (2)	Miami Dolphins
1971	George Allen (2)	Washington Redskins
1972	Don Shula (3)	Miami Dolphins
1973	Chuck Knox	Los Angeles Rams
1974	Don Coryell	St. Louis Cardinals
1975	Ted Marchibroda	Baltimore Colts
1976	Chuck Fairbanks	New England Patriots
1977	Red Miller	Denver Broncos
1978	Walt Michaels	New York Jets
1979	Dick Vermeil	Philadelphia Eagles
1980	Chuck Knox (2)	Buffalo Bills
1981	Bill Walsh	San Francisco 49ers
1982	Joe Gibbs	Washington Redskins
1983	Joe Gibbs (2)	Washington Redskins
1984	Dan Reeves	Denver Broncos
1985	Mike Ditka	Chicago Bears
1986	Bill Parcells	New York Giants
1987	Jim Mora	New Orleans Saints
1988	Mike Ditka	Chicago Bears
1989	George Seifert	San Francisco 49ers
1990	Art Shell	Los Angeles Raiders
1991	Wayne Fontes	Detroit Lions
1992	Bill Cowher	Pittsburgh Steelers
1993	Dan Reeves (2)	New York Giants
1994	Bill Parcells (2)	New England Patriots
1995	Ray Rhodes	Philadelphia Eagles
1996	Dom Capers	Carolina Panthers
1997	Jim Fassel	New York Giants
1998	Dan Reeves (3)	Atlanta Falcons
1999	Dick Vermeil	St. Louis Rams
2000	Jim Haslett	New Orleans Saints
2001	Dick Jauron	Chicago Bears
2002	Andy Reid	Philadelphia Eagles
2003	Bill Belichick	New England Patriots
2004	Marty Schottenheimer	San Diego Chargers
2005	Lovie Smith	Chicago Bears
2006	Sean Payton	New Orleans Saints
2007	Bill Belichick (2)	New England Patriots
2008	Tony Sparano	Miami Dolphins

== Greasy Neale Award (Maxwell Football Club) ==
Earle "Greasy" Neale Award
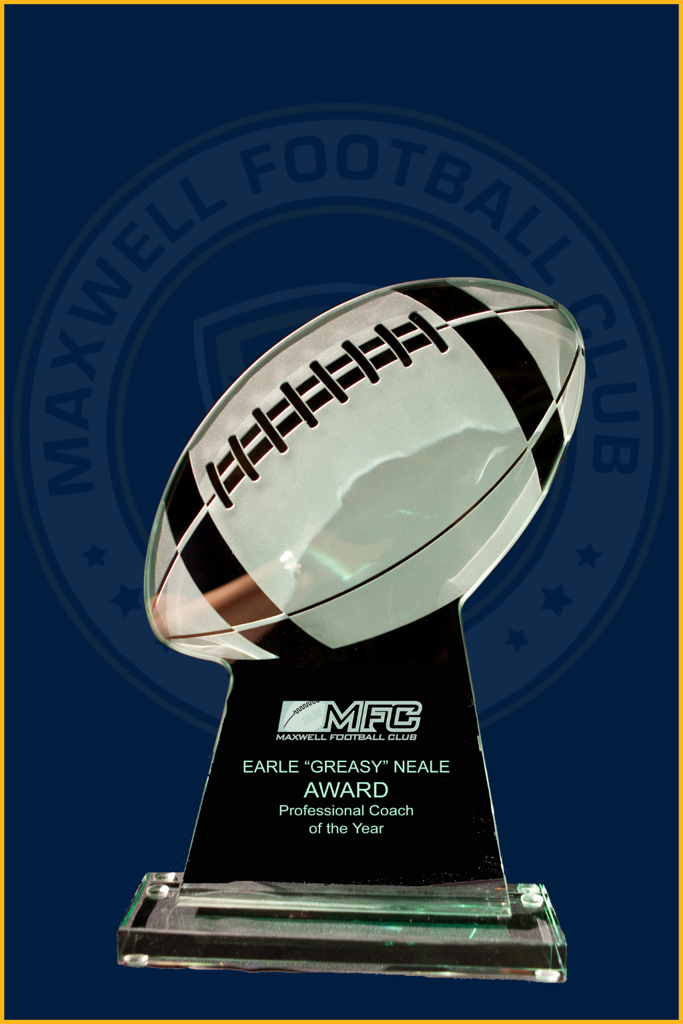
- Professional Coach of the Year Award
- Awarded for: Top head coach in the NFL
- Country: United States
- Presented by: Maxwell Football Club

History
- First award: 1989
- Most recent: Ben Johnson

The award, named after Earle "Greasy" Neale, was established in 1989 and is presented by the Maxwell Football Club to the top head coach in the NFL.

Year	AFC/NFC Coach	Team
1989	Chuck Noll	Pittsburgh Steelers
1990	Art Shell	Los Angeles Raiders
1991	Wayne Fontes	Detroit Lions
1992	Bobby Ross	San Diego Chargers
1993	Dan Reeves	New York Giants
1994	Bill Parcells	New England Patriots
1995	Ray Rhodes	Philadelphia Eagles
1996	Dom Capers	Carolina Panthers
1997	Tony Dungy	Tampa Bay Buccaneers
1998	Dennis Green	Minnesota Vikings
1999	Dick Vermeil	St. Louis Rams
2000	Andy Reid	Philadelphia Eagles
2001	Dick Jauron	Chicago Bears
2002	Andy Reid (2)	Philadelphia Eagles
2003	Dick Vermeil (2)	Kansas City Chiefs
2004	Marty Schottenheimer	San Diego Chargers
2005	Tony Dungy (2)	Indianapolis Colts
2006	Sean Payton	New Orleans Saints
2007	Bill Belichick	New England Patriots
2008	Jeff Fisher	Tennessee Titans
2009	Sean Payton (2)	New Orleans Saints
2010	Andy Reid (3)	Philadelphia Eagles
2011	Mike McCarthy	Green Bay Packers
2012	Chuck Pagano/Bruce Arians	Indianapolis Colts
2013	Chip Kelly	Philadelphia Eagles
2014	Bruce Arians (2)	Arizona Cardinals
2015	Ron Rivera	Carolina Panthers
2016	Jack Del Rio	Oakland Raiders
2017	Doug Pederson	Philadelphia Eagles
2018	Andy Reid (4)	Kansas City Chiefs
2019	John Harbaugh	Baltimore Ravens
2020	Bruce Arians (3)	Tampa Bay Buccaneers
2021	Zac Taylor	Cincinnati Bengals
2022	Nick Sirianni	Philadelphia Eagles
2023	Dan Campbell	Detroit Lions
2024	Sean McDermott	Buffalo Bills
2025	Ben Johnson	Chicago Bears

== Touchdown Club of Columbus NFL Coach of the Year ==
This award is officially called the Paul Brown Trophy.

== Kansas City Committee of 101 AFC/NFC Coach of the Year Awards ==
See: Kansas City Committee of 101 Awards#Coach of the Year Awards (NFC and AFC) (since 1969)

== AP AFL Coach of the Year ==
**Bold**	Denotes team won the Super Bowl/AFL Championship that season
Italic	Denotes first year head coach of that team
*	Denotes interim coach
†	Member of the Pro Football Hall of Fame as a head coach or executive

Season	Coach	Team	Record
1961	Wally Lemm*	**Houston Oilers**	10–3–1
1962	Jack Faulkner	Denver Broncos	7–7
1963	Al Davis^{†}	Oakland Raiders	10–4
1964	Mike Holovak	Boston Patriots	10–3–1
1965	Lou Saban	**Buffalo Bills**	10–3–1
1966	Hank Stram^{†}	**Kansas City Chiefs**	11–2–1
1967	John Rauch	Oakland Raiders	13–1
1968	Hank Stram^{†} (2)	Kansas City Chiefs	12–2
1969	Paul Brown^{†}	Cincinnati Bengals	4–9–1

== UPI National Football League Coach of the Year ==
Year			NFC coach	Team
1955			Joe Kuharich	Washington Redskins
1956			Buddy Parker	Detroit Lions
1957			Paul Brown	Cleveland Browns
1958			Weeb Ewbank	Baltimore Colts
1959			Vince Lombardi	Green Bay Packers
Year	AFL coach	Team	NFL coach	Team
1960	Lou Rymkus	Houston Oilers	Buck Shaw	Philadelphia Eagles
1961	Wally Lemm	Houston Oilers	Allie Sherman	New York Giants
1962	Jack Faulkner	Denver Broncos	Allie Sherman	New York Giants
1963	Al Davis	Oakland Raiders	George Halas	Chicago Bears
1964	Lou Saban	Buffalo Bills	Don Shula	Baltimore Colts
1965	Lou Saban	Buffalo Bills	George Halas	Chicago Bears
1966	Mike Holovak	Boston Patriots	Tom Landry	Dallas Cowboys
1967	John Rauch	Oakland Raiders	George Allen	Los Angeles Rams
1968	Hank Stram	Kansas City Chiefs	Don Shula	Baltimore Colts
1969	Paul Brown	Cincinnati Bengals	Bud Grant	Minnesota Vikings
Year	AFC coach	Team	NFC coach	Team
1970	Paul Brown	Cincinnati Bengals	Alex Webster	New York Giants
1971	Don Shula	Miami Dolphins	George Allen	Washington Redskins
1972	Chuck Noll	Pittsburgh Steelers	Dan Devine	Green Bay Packers
1973	John Ralston	Denver Broncos	Chuck Knox	Los Angeles Rams
1974	Sid Gillman	Houston Oilers	Don Coryell	St. Louis Cardinals
1975	Ted Marchibroda	Baltimore Colts	Tom Landry	Dallas Cowboys
1976	Chuck Fairbanks	New England Patriots	Jack Pardee	Chicago Bears
1977	Red Miller	Denver Broncos	Leeman Bennett	Atlanta Falcons
1978	Walt Michaels	New York Jets	Dick Vermeil	Philadelphia Eagles
1979	Sam Rutigliano	Cleveland Browns	Jack Pardee	Washington Redskins
1980	Sam Rutigliano	Cleveland Browns	Leeman Bennett	Atlanta Falcons
1981	Forrest Gregg	Cincinnati Bengals	Bill Walsh	San Francisco 49ers
1982	Tom Flores	Los Angeles Raiders	Joe Gibbs	Washington Redskins
1983	Chuck Knox	Seattle Seahawks	John Robinson	Los Angeles Rams
1984	Chuck Knox	Seattle Seahawks	Bill Walsh	San Francisco 49ers
1985	Raymond Berry	New England Patriots	Mike Ditka	Chicago Bears
1986	Marty Schottenheimer	Cleveland Browns	Bill Parcells	New York Giants
1987	Ron Meyer	Indianapolis Colts	Jim Mora	New Orleans Saints
1988	Marv Levy	Buffalo Bills	Mike Ditka	Chicago Bears
1989	Dan Reeves	Denver Broncos	Lindy Infante	Green Bay Packers
1990	Art Shell	Los Angeles Raiders	Jimmy Johnson	Dallas Cowboys
1991	Dan Reeves	Denver Broncos	Wayne Fontes	Detroit Lions
1992	Bobby Ross	San Diego Chargers	Dennis Green	Minnesota Vikings
1993	Marv Levy	Buffalo Bills	Dan Reeves	New York Giants
1994	Bill Parcells	New England Patriots	Dave Wannstedt	Chicago Bears
1995	Marty Schottenheimer	Kansas City Chiefs	Ray Rhodes	Philadelphia Eagles
1996	Tom Coughlin	Jacksonville Jaguars	Dom Capers	Carolina Panthers

== See also ==
- List of NFL awards
