= 1991 Denver Broncos season =

American football team season

- Owner: Pat Bowlen
- General manager: John Beake
- Head coach: Dan Reeves
- Offensive coordinator: Mike Shanahan
- Defensive coordinator: Wade Phillips
- Home stadium: Mile High Stadium

Results
- Record: 12–4
- Division place: 1st AFC West
- Playoffs: Won Divisional Playoffs (vs. Oilers) 26–24; Lost AFC Championship (at Bills) 7–10
- Pro Bowlers: QB John Elway; RB Gaston Green; LB Karl Mecklenburg; S Steve Atwater; S Dennis Smith

Uniform
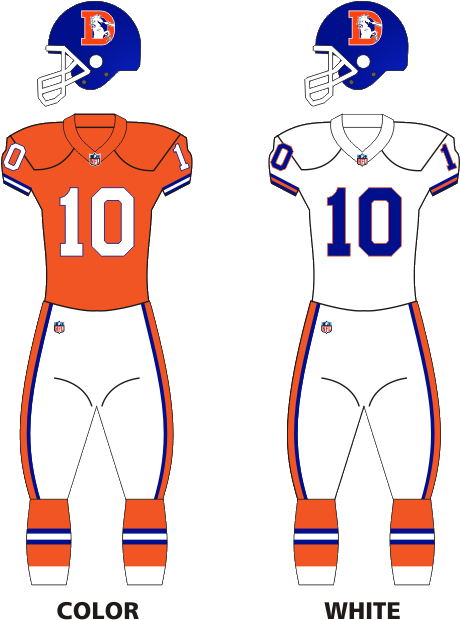

The 1991 Denver Broncos season was the team's 32nd year in professional football and its 22nd as a member club in the National Football League (NFL). The team improved on its 5–11 from 1990, winning their third AFC West title in five years, and advanced to the AFC Championship Game, where they fell to the Buffalo Bills 10–7. Overall, the Denver Broncos had five players who were selected to participate in the Pro Bowl. This season also brought The Drive II. In the divisional round of the playoffs, versus the Houston Oilers, the Broncos started the game-winning drive at their own 2-yard line and ended with a game-winning field goal for a 26–24 victory.

== Offseason ==
=== NFL draft ===
1991 Denver Broncos draft
Round	Pick	Player	Position	College	Notes
1	4	Mike Croel	DE	Nebraska	
2	30	Reggie Johnson	TE	Florida State	
3	61	Keith Traylor	DT	Central State (OK)	
4	89	Derek Russell	WR	Arkansas	
5	115	Greg Lewis	RB	Washington	
6	142	Nick Subis	OT	San Diego State	
8	200	Kenny Walker	DE	Nebraska	
9	227	Don Gibson	Defensive tackle	USC	
10	253	Curtis Mayfield	Wide receiver	Oklahoma State	
11	284	Shawn Moore	Quarterback	Virginia	
Made roster † Pro Football Hall of Fame * Made at least one Pro Bowl during career

=== Undrafted free agents ===
1991 undrafted free agents of note
Player	Position	College
John Story	Wide Receiver	Indiana State

== Personnel ==
=== Staff ===
1991 Denver Broncos staff
Front office: President and Chief Executive Officer – Pat Bowlen; General Manager – John Beake; Director of Football Operations – Lide Huggins; Director of Player Personnel – Reed Johnson; Head coaches: Vice President/Head Coach – Dan Reeves; Special Assistant – Marvin Bass; Offensive coaches: Offensive Coordinator/Quarterbacks – Mike Shanahan; Running Backs – Mo Forte; Wide Receivers – George Henshaw; Offensive Line – Pete Mangurian	Defensive coaches: Defensive Coordinator – Wade Phillips; Defensive Line – Ernie Stautner; Linebackers – Mike Nolan; Defensive Backs – Charlie Waters; Defensive Assistant – Barney Chavous; Defensive Quality Control – Joe DeCamillis; Special teams coaches: Tight Ends/Special Teams – Harold Richardson; Strength and conditioning: Strength/Conditioning – Al Miller

=== Roster ===
1991 Denver Broncos roster
Quarterbacks (QB): 7 John Elway; 8 Gary Kubiak; 12 Shawn Moore; Running backs (RB): 28 Gaston Green; 26 Bobby Humphrey; 41 Greg Lewis; 38 Reggie Rivers; 30 Steve Sewell; Wide receivers (WR): 82 Vance Johnson PR; 84 Ricky Nattiel PR; 85 Derek Russell KR; 83 Mike Young; Tight ends (TE): 89 Reggie Johnson; 88 Clarence Kay; 81 Shannon Sharpe	Offensive linemen (OL): 62 Jeff Davidson T; 63 Sean Farrell G; 72 Keith Kartz C; 68 Crawford Ker G; 76 Ken Lanier T; 74 Harvey Salem T; 60 Nick Subis; 79 Dave Widell; 67 Doug Widell G; Defensive linemen (DL): 90 Ron Holmes DE; 71 Greg Kragen NT; 91 Warren Powers DE; 70 Brian Sochia; 96 Kenny Walker DE	Linebackers (LB): 56 Michael Brooks ILB; 51 Mike Croel OLB; 73 Simon Fletcher OLB; 59 Tim Lucas OLB; 77 Karl Mecklenburg ILB; 52 Jeff Mills OLB; 57 Mark Murray ILB; 54 Keith Traylor ILB; Defensive backs (DB): 27 Steve Atwater FS; 34 Tyrone Braxton CB; 29 Charles Dimry CB; 24 Wymon Henderson CB; 21 Le-Lo Lang CB; 22 Alton Montgomery; 48 Randy Robbins SS; 49 Dennis Smith SS; Special teams (ST): 2 Mike Horan P; 9 David Treadwell K	Practice squad: -- Don Gibson NT; 86 Barry Johnson WR; Reserve: 93 Ronnie Haliburton LB (IR); 80 Mark Jackson WR (IR); 66 Jim Juriga G/T (IR); 33 Bob Perryman FB (IR); 47 active, 4 inactive, 2 practice squad Rookies in italics

== Preseason ==
Week	Date	Opponent	Result	Record	Venue	Attendance
1	July 27	vs. Detroit Lions	L 3–14	0–1	Fawcett Stadium	23,815
2	August 2	Indianapolis Colts	W 10–3	1–1	Mile High Stadium	75,375
3	August 7	at San Francisco 49ers	L 6–24	1–2	Candlestick Park	54,170
4	August 19	Miami Dolphins	W 21–13	2–2	Mile High Stadium	54,170
5	August 23	at Phoenix Cardinals	L 10–34	2–3	Sun Devil Stadium	38,372

== Regular season ==
=== Schedule ===
Week	Date	Opponent	Result	Record	Venue	Attendance	Recap
1	September 1	Cincinnati Bengals	**W** 45–14	1–0	Mile High Stadium	72,855	Recap
2	September 8	at **Los Angeles Raiders**	**L** 13–16	1–1	Los Angeles Memorial Coliseum	48,569	Recap
3	September 15	**Seattle Seahawks**	**W** 16–10	2–1	Mile High Stadium	74,152	Recap
4	September 22	**San Diego Chargers**	**W** 27–19	3–1	Mile High Stadium	73,258	Recap
5	September 29	at Minnesota Vikings	**W** 13–6	4–1	Hubert H. Humphrey Metrodome	55,031	Recap
6	October 6	at Houston Oilers	**L** 14–42	4–2	Houston Astrodome	59,145	Recap
7	Bye						
8	October 20	**Kansas City Chiefs**	**W** 19–16	5–2	Mile High Stadium	75,866	Recap
9	October 27	at New England Patriots	**W** 9–6	6–2	Foxboro Stadium	43,994	Recap
10	November 3	Pittsburgh Steelers	**W** 20–13	7–2	Mile High Stadium	70,973	Recap
11	November 10	**Los Angeles Raiders**	**L** 16–17	7–3	Mile High Stadium	75,896	Recap
12	November 17	at **Kansas City Chiefs**	**W** 24–20	8–3	Arrowhead Stadium	74,661	Recap
13	November 24	at **Seattle Seahawks**	**L** 10–13	8–4	Kingdome	60,430	Recap
14	December 1	New England Patriots	**W** 20–3	9–4	Mile High Stadium	67,116	Recap
15	December 8	at Cleveland Browns	**W** 17–7	10–4	Cleveland Municipal Stadium	73,539	Recap
16	December 15	Phoenix Cardinals	**W** 24–19	11–4	Mile High Stadium	74,098	Recap
17	December 22	at **San Diego Chargers**	**W** 17–14	12–4	Jack Murphy Stadium	51,449	Recap
Note: Intra-division opponents are in **bold** text.

=== Postseason ===
Round	Date	Opponent (seed)	Result	Record	Venue	Recap
Wild Card	First-round bye					
Divisional	January 4, 1992	Houston Oilers (3)	**W** 26–24	1–0	Mile High Stadium	Recap
Championship	January 12, 1992	at Buffalo Bills (1)	**L** 7–10	1–1	Rich Stadium	Recap

=== Season summary ===
==== Week 2 at Raiders ====
Week Two: Denver Broncos (1–0) at Los Angeles Raiders (0–1)

Quarter	1	2	3	4	Total
Broncos	3	3	0	7	**13**
**Raiders**	0	3	7	6	**16**

at Los Angeles Memorial Coliseum, Los Angeles, California

- Date: September 8
- Game time: 4:00 p.m. EST
- Game weather: 65 °F (18 °C)
- Game attendance: 48,569
- Box Score, Box Score

Game information

First quarter

- DEN – David Treadwell 22-yard field goal, 2:29. Broncos 3–0.

Second quarter

- DEN – David Treadwell 47-yard field goal, 13:11. Broncos 6–0.
- LA – Jeff Jaeger 29-yard field goal, 6:23. Broncos 6–3.

Third quarter

- LA – Willie Gault 16-yard pass from Jay Schroeder (Jeff Jaeger kick), 5:47. Raiders 10–6.

Fourth quarter

- LA – Jeff Jaeger 23-yard field goal, 9:17. Raiders 13–6.
- LA – Jeff Jaeger 34-yard field goal, 2:48. Raiders 16–6.
- DEN – Steve Sewell 3-yard pass from John Elway (David Treadwell kick), 0:25. Raiders 16–10.

Top passers

- DEN – John Elway – 15/29, 240 yards, TD
- LA – Jay Schroeder – 12/19, 168 yards, TD

Top rushers

- DEN – Gaston Green – 11 rushes, 25 yards
- LA – Roger Craig – 27 rushes, 99 yards

Top receivers

- DEN – Steve Sewell – 3 receptions, 50 yards, TD
- LA – Willie Gault – 3 receptions, 69 yards, TD

==== Week 10 ====
Team	1	2	3	4	Total
Steelers	3	7	0	3	13
• **Broncos**	0	17	3	0	20

- Date: November 3
- Location: Mile High Stadium • Denver, Colorado
- Game start: 6:00 p.m. MST
- Game weather: 16 °F (−9 °C), wind 8 mph (13 km/h)
- Referee: Dick Hantak
- TV announcers (ESPN): Mike Patrick & Joe Theismann

Scoring summary
1	PIT	Gary Anderson 26-yard field goal	Steelers 3–0
2	PIT	Eric Green 23-yard pass from Neil O'Donnell (Gary Anderson kick)	Steelers 10–0
2	DEN	Greg Lewis 1-yard run (David Treadwell kick)	Steelers 10–7
2	DEN	John Elway 4-yard run (David Treadwell kick)	Broncos 14–10
2	DEN	David Treadwell 28-yard field goal	Broncos 17–10
3	DEN	David Treadwell 21-yard field goal	Broncos 20–10
4	PIT	Gary Anderson 39-yard field goal	Broncos 20–13

=== Standings ===
AFC West
	W	L	T	PCT	DIV	CONF	PF	PA	STK
^{(2)} Denver Broncos	12	4	0	.750	5–3	10–4	304	235	W4
^{(4)} Kansas City Chiefs	10	6	0	.625	6–2	8–4	322	252	W1
^{(5)} Los Angeles Raiders	9	7	0	.563	5–3	7–5	298	297	L3
Seattle Seahawks	7	9	0	.438	2–6	6–6	276	261	W1
San Diego Chargers	4	12	0	.250	2–6	3–9	274	342	L1

== Playoffs ==
=== AFC Divisional Playoff ===
Denver Broncos 26, Houston Oilers 24

Quarter	1	2	3	4	Total
Oilers	14	7	0	3	24
Broncos	6	7	3	10	26

at Mile High Stadium, Denver, Colorado

- Game time: 4:00 p.m. EST/2:00 p.m. MST
- Game weather: 30 °F (−1 °C), cloudy
- Game attendance: 75,301
- Referee: Johnny Grier
- TV announcers (NBC): Charlie Jones and Todd Christensen

Trailing 24–23 with 2:07 left in the game, quarterback John Elway led the Broncos from their own 2-yard line to the winning 28-yard field goal with 16 seconds remaining. On the drive, he converted on two fourth downs. On fourth down and 6 from the Denver 28, he rushed for 7 yards. Then on fourth down and 10, he completed a 44-yard pass to wide receiver Vance Johnson.

The Oilers jumped to a 14–0 lead with quarterback Warren Moon's two touchdown passes to wide receivers Haywood Jeffires and Drew Hill for 15 and 9 yards, respectively. Elway then completed a 10-yard touchdown to Johnson, but kicker David Treadwell missed the extra point. Moon responded by throwing a 6-yard touchdown to wide receiver Curtis Duncan to give Houston a 21–6 lead, but Denver running back Greg Lewis scored a 1-yard touchdown before halftime. In the second half, the Oilers were limited to only a 25-yard field goal by kicker Al Del Greco, which gave Houston a 24–16 lead in the fourth quarter. The Broncos then marched 80 yards to score on Lewis' 1-yard touchdown run to cut the deficit to 24–23.

Elway's comeback is now known solely as The Drive II. Broncos go to the AFC Championship Game but lost to the Bills 10-7.

=== AFC Championship Game ===
Buffalo Bills 10, Denver Broncos 7

Quarter	1	2	3	4	Total
Broncos	0	0	0	7	7
Bills	0	0	7	3	10

at Rich Stadium, Orchard Park, New York

- Game time: 12:30 p.m. EST
- Game weather: 34 °F (1 °C), clear
- Game attendance: 80,272
- Referee: Dale Hamer
- TV announcers (NBC): Dick Enberg and Bill Walsh

Buffalo relied on missed field goals by Denver and some key plays from their defense to narrowly defeat the Broncos in a tough defensive struggle. Although the first half was scoreless, the Broncos advanced into Buffalo territory on all five of their possessions in the first half. However, Denver kicker David Treadwell missed 3 field goals, hitting the goal posts twice and driving the other attempt wide right.

Late in the third quarter, the Broncos faced second down and 10 at their own 19-yard line. Quarterback John Elway threw a middle screen pass intended for running back Steve Sewell, but it was tipped by Bills defensive lineman Jeff Wright into the arms of linebacker Carlton Bailey, who returned the ball 11 yards for Buffalo's only touchdown of the game. Elway was then knocked out of the game after suffering a deep thigh bruise, and was replaced by backup Gary Kubiak. With 4:18 left in the game, Buffalo kicker Scott Norwood made a 44-yard field goal to increase the lead, 10–0. Kubiak, who was playing in his last NFL game before retiring, led the Broncos 85 yards in eight plays and scored a 3-yard touchdown run with 1:43 left. Denver then recovered the ensuing onside kick, but the Bills clinched the victory after defensive back Kirby Jackson forced and recovered a fumble from running back Steve Sewell.

Broncos receiver Vance Johnson finished the game with 8 receptions for 104 yards. Kubiak completed 11 of 12 passes for 136 yards and rushed for 22.

Scoring
BUF – Bailey 11 interception return (Norwood kick) BUF 7–0
BUF – field goal Norwood 44 BUF 10–0
DEN – Kubiak 3 run (Treadwell kick) BUF 10–7 Broncos lost and in 1992 missed the playoffs 8-8.
