= Mark Jackson (wide receiver) =

American football player (born 1963)

No. 80, 89, 84
- Position: Wide receiver

Personal information
- Born: July 23, 1963 (age 63); Chicago, Illinois, U.S.
- Listed height: 5 ft 9 in (1.75 m)
- Listed weight: 180 lb (82 kg)

Career information
- College: Purdue
- NFL draft: 1986: 6th round, 161st overall pick

Career history
- Denver Broncos (1986–1992); New York Giants (1993–1994); Indianapolis Colts (1994)

Awards and highlights
- Peach Bowl (1984)

Career NFL statistics
- Receptions: 342
- Receiving yards: 5,551
- Receiving touchdowns: 29
- Stats at Pro Football Reference

Mark Anthony Jackson (born July 23, 1963) is an American former professional football player who was a wide receiver in the National Football League (NFL). He selected by the Denver Broncos in the sixth round of the 1986 NFL draft. Jackson attended high school at Terre Haute South Vigo High School and Alton Senior High School.

A receiver from Purdue University, Jackson played in the 1984 Peach Bowl before spending nine NFL seasons from 1986 to 1994 for the Broncos, the New York Giants, and the Indianapolis Colts. Jackson played in Super Bowls XXI, XXII, and XXIV with the Broncos. Jackson caught the touchdown pass that sent the game into overtime, completing "The Drive" in the Broncos' January 11, 1987 AFC Championship Game victory over the Cleveland Browns.

Along with Vance Johnson and Ricky Nattiel, Jackson comprised the "Three Amigos" receiving combination in the late 1980s. As of 2017's NFL off-season, Mark Jackson held the Broncos franchise record for career yards per reception in the playoffs (19.29).

== NFL career statistics ==
Legend
**Bold**	Career high

=== Regular season ===
Year	Team	Games		Receiving				
Year	Team	GP	GS	Rec	Yds	Avg	Lng	TD
1986	DEN	**16**	1	38	738	**19.4**	53	1
1987	DEN	12	11	26	436	16.8	52	2
1988	DEN	12	4	46	852	18.5	63	6
1989	DEN	**16**	**16**	28	446	15.9	49	2
1990	DEN	**16**	15	57	**926**	16.2	66	4
1991	DEN	12	10	33	603	18.3	**71**	1
1992	DEN	**16**	13	48	745	15.5	51	**8**
1993	NYG	**16**	14	**58**	708	12.2	40	4
1994	NYG	2	0	0	0	0.0	0	0
1994	IND	12	0	8	97	12.1	22	1
		130	84	342	5,551	16.2	71	29

=== Playoffs ===
Year	Team	Games		Receiving				
Year	Team	GP	GS	Rec	Yds	Avg	Lng	TD
1986	DEN	**3**	0	5	76	15.2	24	**1**
1987	DEN	**3**	**3**	**8**	**210**	**26.3**	**80**	**1**
1989	DEN	**3**	**3**	7	136	19.4	51	0
1991	DEN	1	0	1	4	4.0	4	0
1993	NYG	2	2	4	25	6.3	12	0
		12	8	25	451	18.0	80	2
