= Dan Reeves =

American football player and coach (1944–2022)

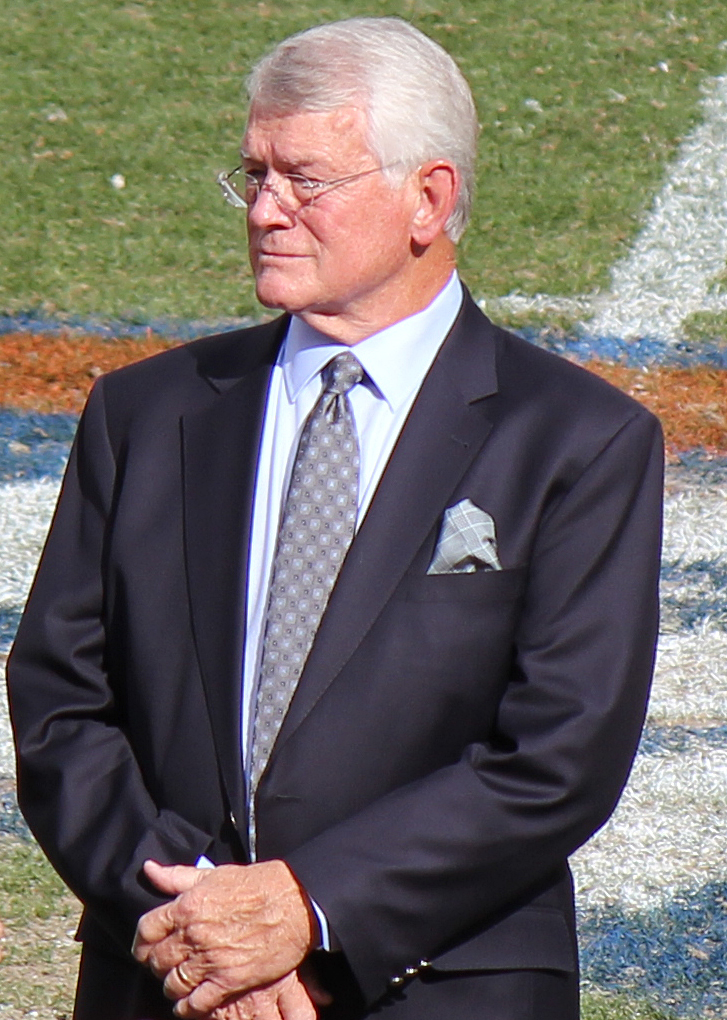
- Reeves in 2014

No. 30
- Position: Running back

Personal information
- Born: January 19, 1944; Rome, Georgia, U.S.
- Died: January 1, 2022 (aged 77); Atlanta, Georgia, U.S.
- Listed height: 6 ft 1 in (1.85 m)
- Listed weight: 200 lb (91 kg)

Career information
- High school: Americus (Americus, Georgia)
- College: South Carolina (1962–1964)
- NFL draft: 1965: undrafted

Career history

Playing
- Dallas Cowboys (1965–1972)

Coaching
- Dallas Cowboys (1970–1980) Offensive coordinator & running backs coach; Denver Broncos (1981–1992) Head coach; New York Giants (1993–1996) Head coach; Atlanta Falcons (1997–2003) Head coach

Operations
- Atlanta Falcons (1997–2003) General manager/player personnel

Awards and highlights
- As player: Super Bowl champion (VI); Second-team All-Pro (1966); 2× Second-team All-ACC (1962, 1964); As assistant coach: Super Bowl champion (XII); As head coach: 2× AP NFL Coach of the Year (1993, 1998); 2× The Sporting News NFL Coach of Year (1993, 1998); 3× Pro Football Weekly NFL Coach of Year (1984, 1993, 1998); 3× UPI Coach of the Year (Note: 2x for the AFC (1989, 1991) and 1x for the NFC (1993)); 5× 101 Awards Coach of the Year (Note: 3x for the AFC (1984, 1989, 1991) and 2x for the NFC (1993, 1998)); Greasy Neale Award (1993); George Halas Award (1999); Denver Broncos Ring of Fame

Career NFL statistics
- Rushing yards: 1,990
- Rushing average: 3.7
- Receptions: 129
- Receiving yards: 1,693
- Total touchdowns: 42
- Stats at Pro Football Reference

Head coaching record
- Regular season: 190–165–2 (.535)
- Postseason: 11–9 (.550)
- Career: 201–174–2 (.536)
- Coaching profile at Pro Football Reference
- Executive profile at Pro Football Reference

Daniel Edward Reeves (January 19, 1944 – January 1, 2022) was an American professional football running back and coach in the National Football League (NFL). During his 38 years in the NFL, Reeves participated in nine Super Bowls, the third most for an individual. He was a head coach for 23 seasons, a position he held with the Denver Broncos from 1981 to 1992, the New York Giants from 1993 to 1996, and the Atlanta Falcons from 1997 to 2003. As a player, he spent his eight-season career with the Dallas Cowboys, who signed him as an undrafted free agent in 1965.

Reeves made his first two Super Bowl appearances during his playing career, winning one in Super Bowl VI. He began his coaching career in 1972 as an assistant for Cowboys, where he made three championship appearances and was part of the staff that won Super Bowl XII. As the head coach of the Broncos for 12 seasons, Reeves led the team to three championship appearances in Super Bowl XXI, Super Bowl XXII, and Super Bowl XXIV, each of which ended in defeat. He spent his next four seasons as the head coach of the Giants, winning NFL Coach of the Year in 1993 after bringing the team to the playoffs that season, although they would not qualify again under him. In his final seven seasons, Reeves was the head coach of the Falcons. His most successful season with the Falcons was in 1998 when he led them to their championship debut in Super Bowl XXXIII, in which he was defeated by his former team, the Broncos. He also won NFL Coach of the Year a second time, making him the ninth coach to win the award multiple times and the first Falcons coach to receive it. For his accomplishments in Denver, Reeves was inducted to the Broncos Ring of Fame in 2014.

One of only 13 NFL head coaches to win 200 career games, Reeves has the most playoff wins (11, tied with Marv Levy) and Super Bowl appearances (four, tied with Levy and Bud Grant) among NFL head coaches to not win a championship. He is also tied with Jeff Fisher and Bill Belichick for the most regular season losses in NFL history at 165. Reeves, Belichick, and Marty Schottenheimer are the only eligible NFL head coaches with 200 career wins who have not been inducted to the Pro Football Hall of Fame.

== Early life ==
Born in Rome, Georgia, Reeves grew up in Americus, Georgia. He attended Americus High School, where he participated in football, baseball, and basketball.

After Reeves missed four games with a broken collarbone during his senior season, only the University of South Carolina was interested enough to offer him a football scholarship. The interest from other schools came later, when he won the MVP trophy at the Georgia High School football All-star game, but he decided to stay with his first choice. Reeves also was selected to the All-state basketball team in 1961.

== College career ==
Reeves played college football for the South Carolina Gamecocks, where he was a three-year starter at quarterback from 1962 to 1964. Reeves became the starting quarterback during his sophomore year in 1962 and was named second-team All-conference after his junior and senior years.

Even though he only compiled an 8–21–4 (.303) record, Reeves ended his college career as the leading passer in Gamecock history, accumulating 2,561 yards passing, to go along with sixteen touchdowns and three games with 100 rushing yards. Reeves also played for the South Carolina Gamecocks baseball team.

In 1977, Reeves was inducted into the school's Athletic Hall of Fame. In 2006, he was inducted into the State of South Carolina Athletic Hall of Fame.

== Professional playing career ==
Although he went undrafted after graduation, Reeves received professional sports offers from the Dallas Cowboys in the National Football League (NFL), the San Diego Chargers in the American Football League (AFL) and the Pittsburgh Pirates in Major League Baseball. Reeves signed with the Cowboys as an undrafted free agent in 1965 to play safety, but was later moved to halfback when a series of injuries depleted the team's depth during training camp.

In 1966, Tom Landry, looking for more speed at running back, shifted All-Pro safety Mel Renfro to offense. Renfro was hurt in the opening game, against the New York Giants, and Reeves took advantage of his opportunity by having a breakout season, leading the team in rushing with 757 yards and scoring with 96 points, while finishing second in receiving with 557 yards. His performance helped the Cowboys take some of the running load from fullback Don Perkins and reach their first championship game. Reeves set a franchise record with sixteen touchdowns (eight rushing and eight receiving), had over 1,300 all-purpose yards, was sixth in the NFL in rushing, first in touchdowns, and sixth in scoring. He was also voted to The Sporting News All-Pro team at the end of the year.

In 1967, Reeves posted back-to-back seasons with more than 600 rushing yards, ranking second on the team in rushing with 603 yards and third in receiving with 490 yards. In the week 8 game against the Atlanta Falcons, he set a franchise record after scoring four touchdowns. In the week 13 game against the Philadelphia Eagles, Reeves scored touchdowns rushing, receiving, and passing in the same game. He remained a starter until Week 4 of the 1968 season, when he tore ligaments in his left knee and was lost for the season.

The injury ended up hampering Reeves for the remainder of his career and limiting his abilities. Head coach Tom Landry started playing him in spots and asked him to become a player-coach, while being passed on the depth chart by Calvin Hill and Duane Thomas. Reeves remained in that role for three years, until he retired as an active player to become a full-time assistant coach on February 22, 1972.

Reeves played eight seasons with the Dallas Cowboys, collected 1,990 rushing yards, 1,693 receiving yards, and 42 touchdowns. The Cowboys made the playoffs every year, reaching the Super Bowl twice and culminating in a 24–3 victory over the Miami Dolphins in Super Bowl VI following the 1971 season.

He threw a touchdown pass in the Cowboys' losing effort in the legendary subzero Ice Bowl against the Green Bay Packers for the 1967 NFL title. In Super Bowl V with the Cowboys and Colts tied at 13 in the last two minutes, he let a pass go through his hands that was intercepted, setting up the Colts in Dallas territory. The Colts won the game on a 32-yard field goal from Jim O'Brien with five seconds left. In Super Bowl VI he collected 7 rushing yards as his team, Dallas Cowboys, won their first Super Bowl title, defeating Miami Dolphins.

In 2010, Reeves was inducted into the Texas Sports Hall of Fame.

== Coaching career ==
Reeves, a protégé of Tom Landry, became the youngest head coach in the NFL when he joined the Denver Broncos in 1981 as vice president and head coach. After acquiring quarterback John Elway in a trade, Reeves guided the Broncos to six post-season appearances, five divisional titles, three AFC championships, and three Super Bowl appearances (Super Bowl XXI, Super Bowl XXII, and Super Bowl XXIV) during his twelve-year tenure. He was the only AFC coach in the decade of the 1980s to lead his team to consecutive Super Bowl berths, and his Broncos appeared in the Super Bowl three times during a span of four years. Reeves and Elway did not always see eye-to-eye, to the point where quarterback Tommy Maddox was drafted by the Broncos in the first round of the 1992 draft. This came off the heels of the 1991 season in which Reeves had fired offensive coordinator and quarterbacks coach Mike Shanahan for "insubordination", as Reeves felt that Shanahan was driving a wedge between him and Elway, who said in 1990 that his relationship with Reeves was "the worst." Reeves was fired after the 1992 season and replaced by his protégé and friend Wade Phillips, who was previously the Broncos' defensive coordinator. Upon the death of Reeves in 2022, Elway stated that Reeves was a "winner" and said he owed a good deal of his career to Reeves.

Reeves was hired as head coach by the New York Giants for the 1993 season. In his first season, he led the Giants to an 11–5 record and a berth in the playoffs. Reeves's 1993 season record is the best ever for a first-year Giants coach, and he was named the 1993 Associated Press Coach of the Year after helping them improve from a 6–10 record in 1992. Reeves was fired after the Giants went 5–11 in 1995 and 6–10 in 1996.

In 1997, Reeves was named the head coach of the Atlanta Falcons. Under his command the team, which had finished the 1996 campaign with a 3–13 record, steadily improved. After going 7–9 in his first season in 1997, the Falcons went 14–2 in 1998, going on to capture their first NFC Championship. He became the third coach (after Bill Parcells and Chuck Knox) to lead three different franchises to the playoffs. Reeves coached the Falcons to a 12–2 record before being hospitalized for the final two regular season games to undergo quadruple-bypass heart surgery in December. Reeves managed to return to the sidelines just three weeks later to lead the Falcons to victory against the Minnesota Vikings in the NFC Championship Game. During Super Bowl XXXIII, Reeves's Falcons were pitched against his former team, the defending champion Denver Broncos whose quarterback Elway was in his final season that had Shanahan as head coach. The Falcons lost, 34–19. In the process, Reeves earned the NFL's top coaching awards as he was named the 1998 NFL Coach of the Year. In 2003, after winning just three of the first thirteen games, Reeves was fired and the Falcons replaced him with Wade Phillips as interim coach for three games.

In 2007, Reeves had an active role in the startup of Georgia State University's football program. In January 2009, Reeves interviewed with the San Francisco 49ers for their offensive coordinator job. After negotiations with the Dallas Cowboys, Reeves became a consultant for the team in February 2009. This role was short-lived, lasting two days before Reeves turned in the keys to his office and left. Reeves and the Cowboys could apparently not reach conclusions as to Reeves's role with the team. In the days following, it was revealed that the dispute came down to a contract clause specifying a number of hours per week to be worked, which Reeves deemed insulting.

== Head coaching record ==
Team	Year	Regular season					Postseason			
Team	Year	Won	Lost	Ties	Win %	Finish	Won	Lost	Win %	Result
DEN	1981	10	6	0	.625	2nd in AFC West	–	–	–	–
DEN	1982	2	7	0	.222	5th in AFC West	–	–	–	–
DEN	1983	9	7	0	.563	2nd in AFC West	0	1	.000	Lost to Seattle Seahawks in AFC wild card game
DEN	1984	13	3	0	.813	1st in AFC West	0	1	.000	Lost to Pittsburgh Steelers in AFC Divisional Game
DEN	1985	11	5	0	.688	2nd in AFC West	–	–	–	–
DEN	1986	11	5	0	.688	1st in AFC West	2	1	.667	Lost to New York Giants in Super Bowl XXI
DEN	1987	10	4	1	.700	1st in AFC West	2	1	.667	Lost to Washington Redskins in Super Bowl XXII
DEN	1988	8	8	0	.500	2nd in AFC West	–	–	–	–
DEN	1989	11	5	0	.688	1st in AFC West	2	1	.667	Lost to San Francisco 49ers in Super Bowl XXIV
DEN	1990	5	11	0	.313	5th in AFC West	–	–	–	–
DEN	1991	12	4	0	.750	1st in AFC West	1	1	.500	Lost to Buffalo Bills in AFC Championship Game
DEN	1992	8	8	0	.500	3rd in AFC West	–	–	–	–
DEN total		110	73	1	.601		7	6	.538	
NYG	1993	11	5	0	.688	2nd in NFC East	1	1	.500	Lost to San Francisco 49ers in NFC Divisional Game
NYG	1994	9	7	0	.563	2nd in NFC East	–	–	–	–
NYG	1995	5	11	0	.313	4th in NFC East	–	–	–	–
NYG	1996	6	10	0	.375	5th in NFC East	–	–	–	–
NYG total		31	33	0	.484		1	1	.500	
ATL	1997	7	9	0	.438	2nd in NFC West	–	–	–	–
ATL	1998	14	2	0	.875	1st in NFC West	2	1	.667	Lost to Denver Broncos in Super Bowl XXXIII
ATL	1999	5	11	0	.313	3rd in NFC West	–	–	–	–
ATL	2000	4	12	0	.250	5th in NFC West	–	–	–	–
ATL	2001	7	9	0	.438	3rd in NFC West	–	–	–	–
ATL	2002	9	6	1	.594	2nd in NFC South	1	1	.500	Lost to Philadelphia Eagles in NFC Divisional Game
ATL	2003	3	10	0	.231	Fired mid-season	–	–	–	–
ATL total		49	59	1	.454		3	2	.600	
Total		190	165	2	.535		11	9	.550	

== Broadcast career ==
Reeves covered NFL games as a color analyst (teamed with play-by-play man Bill Rosinski) for the second Sunday afternoon game on the Westwood One radio network.

== Personal life and death ==
Reeves was married to Pam Reeves, and had three children and six grandchildren. Reeves and his future wife dated in high school, where she was a cheerleader. While coaching for the Giants, Reeves and his wife were residents of Ho-Ho-Kus, New Jersey. He was a Christian.

Reeves' nephew is David Andrews, who played for the New England Patriots. His son-in-law, Joe DeCamillis, is a longtime NFL assistant.

Reeves died from complications of dementia at his home in Atlanta on the morning of January 1, 2022, aged 77, about three weeks before his 78th birthday.

== See also ==
- List of National Football League head coaches with 200 wins

== Books ==
- Reeves, Dan; Dick Connor (1988). Reeves: An Autobiography. Chicago: Bonus Books. ISBN 978-0-933893-64-1. OCLC 19519630.
