= Michael Brooks (linebacker) =

American football player (born 1964)

No. 56, 94, 50
- Position: Linebacker

Personal information
- Born: October 2, 1964 (age 62); Ruston, Louisiana, U.S.
- Listed height: 6 ft 1 in (1.85 m)
- Listed weight: 236 lb (107 kg)

Career information
- High school: Ruston
- College: LSU
- NFL draft: 1987: 3rd round, 84th overall pick

Career history
- Denver Broncos (1987–1992); New York Giants (1993–1995); Detroit Lions (1996)

Awards and highlights
- Second-team All-Pro (1993); Pro Bowl (1992); First-team All-American (1985); First-team All-SEC (1985); Second-team All-SEC (1984)

Career NFL statistics
- Sacks: 7
- Interceptions: 4
- Touchdowns: 1
- Stats at Pro Football Reference

Michael Brooks (born October 2, 1964) is an American former professional football player who was a linebacker in the National Football League (NFL). He played for the Denver Broncos, the New York Giants, and the Detroit Lions. He was a third round draft pick by the Broncos in the third round of the 1987 NFL Draft. Brooks played college football at Louisiana State University for the LSU Tigers, earning first-team All-American honors. He is an inductee in the Colorado Sports Hall of Fame and the Louisiana Sports Hall of Fame.

== NFL career statistics ==
Legend
**Bold**	Career high

=== Regular season ===
Year	Team	Games		Tackles				Interceptions				Fumbles			
Year	Team	GP	GS	Comb	Solo	Ast	Sck	Int	Yds	TD	Lng	FF	FR	Yds	TD
1987	DEN	12	0	8	—	—	1.0	0	0	0	0	1	1	0	0
1988	DEN	**16**	4	49	—	—	0.0	0	0	0	0	0	0	0	0
1989	DEN	**16**	**16**	123	—	—	1.0	0	0	0	0	1	2	0	0
1990	DEN	**16**	**16**	**175**	—	—	**2.0**	0	0	0	0	2	0	0	0
1991	DEN	14	14	153	—	—	0.0	**2**	7	0	9	0	0	0	0
1992	DEN	15	14	170	—	—	0.0	1	**17**	0	**17**	**3**	2	**55**	**1**
1993	NYG	13	13	92	—	—	1.0	0	0	0	0	2	1	0	0
1994	NYG	**16**	**16**	118	91	**27**	1.0	1	10	0	10	0	**3**	0	0
1995	NYG	**16**	**16**	116	**95**	21	1.0	0	0	0	0	0	0	0	0
1996	DET	4	4	12	6	6	0.0	0	0	0	0	0	0	0	0
		138	113	1,016	192	54	7.0	4	34	0	17	9	9	55	1
