= Willie Beamon =

American football player (born 1970)

Willie Beamen
No. 21
- Position: Cornerback

Personal information
- Born: June 14, 1970 (age 56); Belle Glade, Florida, U.S.
- Listed height: 5 ft 11 in (1.80 m)
- Listed weight: 184 lb (83 kg)

Career information
- High school: Suncoast
- College: Northern Iowa
- NFL draft: 1993: undrafted

Career history
- New York Giants (1993–1996)

Career NFL statistics
- Tackles: 78
- Sacks: 1
- Interceptions: 2
- Stats at Pro Football Reference

Willie Beamen (born June 14, 1970) is an American former professional football player who was a cornerback in the National Football League (NFL). He played college football for the Northern Iowa Panthers.

== Early life ==
Beamon grew up in Riviera Beach, Florida.

== Career ==
Beamon played for the University of Northern Iowa.

After not being drafted, he played four seasons for the New York Giants.

Beamon is not to be confused with the fictional character Willie Beamen, played by Jamie Foxx in the 1999 film, Any Given Sunday.
