= Greg Bishop =

American football player (born 1971)

No. 78, 65
- Positions: Guard, tackle

Personal information
- Born: May 2, 1971 (age 55); Stockton, California, U.S.
- Listed height: 6 ft 5 in (1.96 m)
- Listed weight: 305 lb (138 kg)

Career information
- High school: Lodi (Lodi, California)
- College: Pacific
- NFL draft: 1993: 4th round, 93rd overall pick

Career history
- New York Giants (1993–1998); Atlanta Falcons (1999)

Career NFL statistics
- Games played: 101
- Games started: 67
- Fumble recoveries: 5
- Stats at Pro Football Reference

Gregory Lawrence Bishop (born May 2, 1971) is an American former professional football player who was an offensive tackle in the National Football League (NFL). He played college football for the Pacific Tigers and was selected by the New York Giants in the fourth round of the 1993 NFL draft. He played for the Giants and the Atlanta Falcons.

== Biography ==
Bishop was born in Stockton, California and graduated from Lodi High School. He played college football at the University of the Pacific, where he played defensive lineman and left tackle.

Bishop played six seasons for the New York Giants, and one season for the Atlanta Falcons before retiring in 1999. In 2004, Bishop was inducted into the University of the Pacific Hall of Fame.

He and his wife Julie live in Lodi, California, and he is an assistant coach on the Lodi High School football team.
