= Stacey Dillard =

American football player (born 1968)

No. 71
- Positions: Nose tackle, defensive tackle

Personal information
- Born: September 17, 1968 (age 58); Clarksville, Texas, U.S.
- Listed height: 6 ft 5 in (1.96 m)
- Listed weight: 290 lb (132 kg)

Career information
- High school: Clarksville (TX)
- College: Oklahoma
- NFL draft: 1992: 6th round, 153rd overall pick

Career history
- New York Giants (1992–1995); Philadelphia Eagles (1997)*
- * Offseason or practice squad member only

Awards and highlights
- Second-team All-Big Eight (1991)

Career NFL statistics
- Tackles: 91
- Sacks: 5.5
- Forced fumbles: 1
- Stats at Pro Football Reference

Stacey Bertrand Dillard (born September 17, 1968) is an American former professional football player who played defensive lineman in the National Football League (NFL). Dillard attended Clarksville High School in Clarksville, Texas playing for coach Hilton Lambeth. After playing college football for the Oklahoma Sooners, Dillard was selected by the New York Giants in the sixth round of the 1992 NFL draft. He played his entire career for the Giants (1992–1995).

Dillard is the former athletic director and former head football coach at Princeton High School in Princeton, Texas.
