= Andre Powell =

American football player (born 1969)

No. 51
- Position: Linebacker

Personal information
- Born: June 5, 1969 (age 57); Baltimore, Maryland, U.S.
- Listed height: 6 ft 1 in (1.85 m)
- Listed weight: 226 lb (103 kg)

Career information
- High school: William Penn (York, Pennsylvania)
- College: Penn State
- NFL draft: 1992: 8th round, 209th overall pick
- Expansion draft: 1995: 12th round, 24th overall pick

Career history
- Miami Dolphins (1992)*; Philadelphia Eagles (1992)*; New York Giants (1993–1994); Carolina Panthers (1995)*
- * Offseason or practice squad member only

Career NFL statistics
- Total tackles: 3
- Stats at Pro Football Reference

Andre Maurice Powell (born June 5, 1969) is an American former professional football player who was a linebacker in the National Football League (NFL) who played for the New York Giants. He was selected by the Miami Dolphins in the eighth round of the 1992 NFL draft. He played college football for the Penn State Nittany Lions.
