= Scott Davis (offensive lineman) =

American football player (born 1970)

No. 62, 72
- Position: Offensive guard

Personal information
- Born: January 29, 1970 (age 56); Glenwood, Iowa, U.S.
- Listed height: 6 ft 3 in (1.91 m)
- Listed weight: 292 lb (132 kg)

Career information
- High school: Glenwood
- College: Iowa
- NFL draft: 1993: 6th round, 150th overall pick

Career history
- New York Giants (1993–1996); Atlanta Falcons (1997)

Awards and highlights
- Second-team All-Big Ten (1992)

Career NFL statistics
- GP / GS: 21 / 6
- Stats at Pro Football Reference

Scott L. Davis (born January 29, 1970) is an American former professional football player who was a guard in the National Football League (NFL). He played college football for the Iowa Hawkeyes. He was selected by the New York Giants in the sixth round of the 1993 NFL draft.

== Early life ==
Davis was born in Glenwood, Iowa and attended Glenwood High School.

== Professional career ==
Davis was selected in the 6th round (150th overall) of the 1993 NFL draft by the New York Giants. He was a member of a draft class that produced Hall of Famer Michael Strahan.

As a rookie, Davis appeared in four games for the Giants. On July 25, 1994, he was involved in a brawl with teammate Chris Maumalanga. The fight resulted in Davis being gashed open from his forehead to his nose. The gash required stitches to be close it. That season, he appeared in 15 games starting four. On July 29, 1995, he signed a two-year contract with the Giants. Going into the 1995 season, he was projected to be the team's starting left guard, however on August 12, he tore the ACL and damaged the MCL in his left knee. It would be a season-ending injury.

On June 17, 1997, he signed with the Atlanta Falcons. After not appearing in a game for two seasons for the Giants, Davis appeared and started in two games for the Falcons.
