= Kenyon Rasheed =

American football player (born 1970)

No. 44/34
- Position: Running back

Personal information
- Born: August 23, 1970 (age 56); Kansas City, Missouri, U.S.
- Listed height: 5 ft 10 in (1.78 m)
- Listed weight: 245 lb (111 kg)

Career information
- College: Oklahoma
- NFL draft: 1993: undrafted

Career history
- 1993–1994: New York Giants
- 1995–1996: New York Jets
- Stats at Pro Football Reference

Kenyon Rasheed is a former National Football League (NFL) running back for the New York Giants.

Kenyon was born August 23, 1970, in Kansas City, Missouri. After graduating Rockhurst High School in Kansas City, Missouri, he attended the University of Oklahoma, where he played football for four years. As a Sooner, he served as the captain of the team, and also was named to the All-Big 8 academic team four years straight. At 5'10" and 245 pounds, Kenyon was drafted to the New York Giants, where he played for four years from 1993 to 1996.

== Beyond football ==
He is now the CEO of Rasheed & Associates.
