= George Henshaw =

American football player and coach (born 1948)

Biographical details
- Born: January 22, 1948 (age 78); Richmond, Virginia, U.S.

Playing career
- 1967–1969: West Virginia
- Position: Defensive tackle

Coaching career (HC unless noted)
- 1970–1971: West Virginia (GA)
- 1972: West Virginia (JV)
- 1973–1975: West Virginia (DL)
- 1976–1978: Florida State (DL)
- 1979–1982: Florida State (OC/OL)
- 1983–1986: Alabama (OC/OL)
- 1987: Tulsa
- 1988–1990: Denver Broncos (OL)
- 1991: Denver Broncos (WR)
- 1992: Denver Broncos (OC/WR)
- 1993–1994: New York Giants (OC/QB)
- 1995–1996: New York Giants (OC)
- 1997–1998: Tennessee Oilers (OL/TE)
- 1999–2005: Tennessee Titans (AHC)
- 2006–2007: New Orleans Saints (SA/RB)
- 2013: Tennessee Titans (TE)

Head coaching record
- Overall: 3–8

Accomplishments and honors

Awards
- First-team All-Southern Conference (1967)

George Henshaw (born January 22, 1948) is an American former football coach. He was the head football coach at the University of Tulsa in 1987, where he compiled a record of 3–8. Henshaw also served as offensive coordinator for the Denver Broncos and New York Giants of the NFL. He played college football at West Virginia University between 1967 and 1969. From 1970 to 1975, he served as an assistant coach at West Virginia. He was also an offensive coordinator at the University of Alabama and Florida State University.

== Head coaching record ==
Year	Team	Overall	Conference	Standing	Bowl/playoffs
Tulsa Golden Hurricane (NCAA Division I-A independent) (1987)
1987	Tulsa	3–8			
Tulsa:		3–8			
Total:		3–8			

== Personal life ==
Henshaw and his wife Katherine have three children, Michael, Matthew and Kerry.
