= David Treadwell =

American football player (born 1965)

No. 9, 18
- Position: Placekicker

Personal information
- Born: February 27, 1965 (age 61); Columbia, South Carolina, U.S.
- Listed height: 6 ft 1 in (1.85 m)
- Listed weight: 195 lb (88 kg)

Career information
- High school: The Bolles School (Jacksonville, Florida)
- College: Clemson
- NFL draft: 1988: undrafted

Career history
- Denver Broncos (1988)*; Phoenix Cardinals (1989)*; Denver Broncos (1989–1992); New York Giants (1993); Kansas City Chiefs (1994)*; Pittsburgh Steelers (1994)*; New York Giants (1994)
- * Offseason or practice squad member only

Awards and highlights
- Pro Bowl (1989); All-Pro (1989); Consensus All-American (1987); First-team All-ACC (1987)

Career NFL statistics
- Field goal attempts: 175
- Field goals made: 135
- Field goal %: 77.1
- Stats at Pro Football Reference

David Mark Treadwell (born February 27, 1965) is an American former professional football player who was a placekicker in the National Football League (NFL) for the Denver Broncos (1989-1992) and the New York Giants (1993-1994). He played college football for the Clemson Tigers from 1984 to 1987, where he graduated with a degree in electrical engineering. He was selected to the Pro Bowl after the 1989 season. He was best known for missing all three of his field goal attempts in the 1992 AFC Championship Game against the Buffalo Bills. The Broncos lost the game 10-7.

After retiring from the NFL, Treadwell attended law school at the University of Denver and participated in the campaign to pass a ballot measure to fund the replacement for Mile High Stadium which ultimately became known as Invesco Field at Mile High. That led to a new career in the media. He became a sports talk show host at Denver-based Clear Channel corporation stations KOA and KTLK before moving to Denver's KDVR-TV (Fox 31) as sports director and anchor from 2000 to 2004. He reportedly left the station to "pursue business interests in a land development company." He now works for Newmark Knight Frank and is chairman of the board of directors of the St. Anthony North Health Foundation, affiliated with St. Anthony North Hospital in Westminster, Co., a suburb just north of Denver.
