= 1995 San Diego Chargers–New York Giants game =

American football game notable for poor fan conduct

The Snowball Game
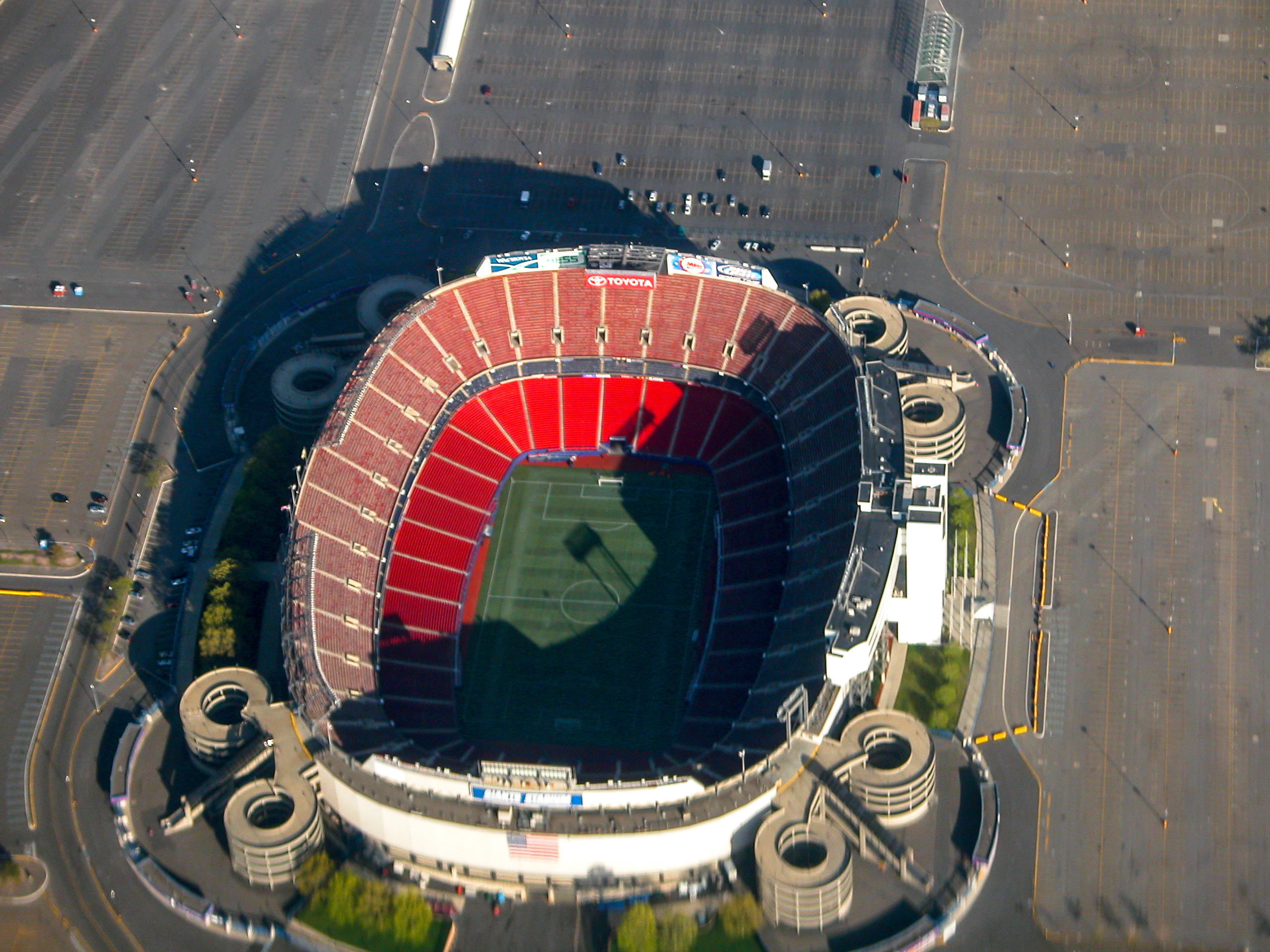
- Giants Stadium, the site of the game
San Diego Chargers (8–7)	New York Giants (5–10)
27	17
Head coach: Bobby Ross	Head coach: Dan Reeves
	1	2	3	4	Total
SD	0	3	7	17	27
NYG	3	14	0	0	17
- Date: December 23, 1995
- Stadium: Giants Stadium; East Rutherford, New Jersey
- Referee: Ron Blum
- Attendance: 50,243

TV in the United States
- Network: NBC
- Announcers: Marv Albert and Cris Collinsworth

On December 23, 1995, the San Diego Chargers and New York Giants faced off in Week 17 of the 1995 NFL season. The game was played at Giants Stadium in East Rutherford, New Jersey, United States, and was the last regular season game for both teams. The Chargers defeated the Giants, 27–17.

The game, which was nationally televised by NBC, became infamous due to the conduct of the fans in the stands that afternoon. A major snowstorm had swept through the New York metropolitan area during the week leading into the game, leaving maintenance crews unable to clear the seating areas in time for the game; as a result, many fans took to throwing snowballs in the stands and onto the field. The chaos that ensued nearly resulted in the Giants being forced to forfeit the game.

== Background ==
=== Chargers ===
Entering the final week of the 1995 season, the defending American Football Conference (AFC) champion Chargers were 8-7 and in danger of missing out on a playoff spot. The team had started the season with three wins in their first four contests, but had followed that up with six losses in their next seven to put them at 4–7. The Chargers had won their last four games and needed only to record a win in their final Week 17 matchup with the Giants to secure one of the AFC's three wild-card spots.

=== Giants ===
The Giants’ fortunes, meanwhile, were quite the opposite. Looking to return to the playoffs for the second time under Dan Reeves and coming off their second consecutive winning season, the Giants opened their 1995 season with a blowout loss to the Dallas Cowboys on national television. New York lost four of its first five games, and a four-game losing streak in November ensured a losing record for the season. The Giants entered the matchup with the Chargers at 5–10, having again lost to the Cowboys a week earlier; the last time the team had lost at least ten games was under Ray Handley, Reeves’ predecessor, in 1992.

=== Broadcast information ===
At the time that this game was played, the National Football League (NFL) had been scheduling a Saturday afternoon doubleheader of games during the last few weeks of the season. Both games would be broadcast nationally, with one game carried by Fox, which in 1995 held the broadcast rights to the National Football Conference (NFC), and the other carried by NBC, which held the broadcasting rights to the AFC. The NFL would later add a third game to their Saturday schedule, which was aired in prime time on either ABC or ESPN, and would keep this schedule until the end of the 2005 season, after which the NFL decided to schedule Saturday games on a more irregular basis.

Since this was an interconference matchup, the broadcast rules of the day dictated that the broadcasting rights for the game would belong to the network holding the visiting team's conference broadcast rights. Since the Chargers were members of the AFC, that meant that NBC would carry the game. Marv Albert provided the play-by-play, with Cris Collinsworth as the analyst and Will McDonough reporting from the sidelines.

The Chargers' radio broadcast was carried by flagship XETRA-AM, with Lee Hamilton as play-by-play. The Giants' broadcast was produced by WFAN but carried over its then flagship WOR, with Bob Papa and Dick Lynch in the booth. The game was also carried nationally by CBS Radio Sports.

In an odd scheduling coincidence, this game was the second time the Chargers had played on a Saturday in three weeks; two weeks earlier, they had played the Arizona Cardinals in another interconference affair (the Cardinals, at the time, were in the same division as the Giants and would continue to be until the end of the 2001 season). That game also became notable for the ill-received experiment by Fox to use a two-man, analyst-only broadcast team.

== Game summary ==
Week 17: San Diego Chargers at New York Giants – Game summary

Quarter	1	2	3	4	Total
Chargers	0	3	7	17	27
Giants	3	14	0	0	17

at Giants Stadium, East Rutherford, New Jersey

- Date: December 23
- Game time: 12:30 p.m. EST
- Game weather: 34 °F (1.1 °C), relative humidity 64%, wind 15 mph, wind chill 24
- Game attendance: 50,243
- Referee: Ron Blum
- TV announcers (NBC): Marv Albert and Cris Collinsworth
- Box score

The Giants opened the scoring after forcing the Chargers to punt on their opening possession. After converting consecutive third downs and crossing into Chargers territory, Dave Brown found Charles Way for a long pass play that put the Giants inside the Chargers' 10-yard line. The Giants settled for a field goal after Brown fumbled, Rodney Hampton gained three yards, and an incomplete pass. Brad Daluiso's 30-yard field goal put the Giants ahead 3–0.

On the ensuing drive, Chargers starter Stan Humphries suffered a neck injury and was unable to continue. Backup quarterback Gale Gilbert came in but the Giants forced another punt. The Chargers responded by stopping Tyrone Wheatley after two short runs and Brown missed Chris Calloway on third down. Chargers punt returner Andre Coleman fumbled the kick on fourth down, however, and the Giants recovered. With the ball on the Chargers' 23-yard line, it took the Giants four plays to score as Brown ran in from three yards out. The extra point made the score 10–0.

The Giants then forced the Chargers into a three-and-out on their next drive, but they would suffer their own punt miscue as Arthur Marshall fumbled and the Chargers recovered on the 16-yard line. After Aaron Hayden got two short gains, Gilbert threw an incompletion on third down. John Carney put the Chargers on the board with a field goal, making the score 10–3.

The Giants scored their second touchdown on a long drive just before the half. Brown completed all six passes he threw on the drive, including a third down completion to Marshall that brought the Giants to the Chargers' 1-yard line. Hampton would cap off the drive with a touchdown run and Daluiso added the extra point to make the score 17–3. These would be the last points the Giants would score.

On the opening drive of the second half, the Giants turned the ball over when Mike Sherrard fumbled after catching a short pass from Brown on third down. The Chargers took advantage of the short field and on the seventh play of their drive, Hayden scored on an eight-yard touchdown run. Carney's extra point cut the deficit to seven. The Giants tried to make up for their gaffe on the previous drive and moved the ball again into the opposing side of the field, as Brown's completion to Aaron Pierce gained twenty-four yards and put the Giants at the Chargers' 29-yard line. Three straight incompletions followed, however, and Daluiso missed his field goal attempt.

After both teams traded punts, the Chargers tied the game in the fourth quarter. The Giants had a chance to stop the Chargers on fourth down at their 29-yard line, but Gilbert found Tony Martin for a 13-yard completion to keep the drive going. The Chargers again found themselves down to a fourth down three plays later, but Rodney Culver found the end zone on an eight-yard touchdown run. Carney made the extra point to even the score at 17.

The Giants took advantage of a short kick by Carney and Brian Kozlowski's return set them up at their own 47. Brown completed a pass to Sherrard for fourteen yards and Hampton followed with three more significant gains to put the Giants at the 9-yard line with a chance to regain the lead. However, Hampton was stopped for a loss on first-and-goal, and on the next play Brown threw a pass that was intercepted by Shaun Gayle at the 1 and taken the entire length of the field for a Chargers touchdown and a 24–17 lead with the extra point.

Brown then lost a fumble on the next drive, giving the Chargers the ball inside Giants territory on the 40-yard line. The Chargers forced the Giants to use two of their timeouts by rushing the ball with Hayden four times, and then Carney came out and closed the scoring with a field goal. A failed fourth down conversion was the result of the Giants' subsequent drive and Brown was sacked on the final play.

== Officials ==
- Referee: Ron Blum (#7)
- Umpire: Bob Wagner (#100)
- Head linesman: Dale Williams (#8)
- Line judge: Bill Spyksma (#12)
- Back judge: Al Jury (#106)
- Side judge: Don Carlsen (#39)
- Field judge: Kirk Dornan (#6)

== The conditions ==
The New York metropolitan area had been experiencing a more active than normal storm season as winter approached in December 1995. In the nine days leading up to this particular game, three significant storms had blown through the area. The last of these three was the most severe, as the area surrounding the Meadowlands received upwards of nine to twelve inches of new snow on top of what had already been sitting on the ground from the previous two.

Maintenance workers at the Meadowlands managed to clear out the aisles before the game started so fans could access their seats. Many seating areas were still covered in snow, however, and had been sitting exposed to the elements for three days prior to the game. Entering the weekend, wind chills in the area were below freezing and any snow that had been left behind had frozen over. Attendance that day was significantly below full capacity, due in part to the weather and icy conditions and also because of the Giants’ poor play to that point. Just over 50,000 fans showed up for the game.

To pass the time, some fans began making snowballs and ice balls and tossing them at each other. As more and more fans joined in the snowball fights, stadium security started to lose control of the situation. A Pittsburgh Steelers fan was chased out of his seat after being bombarded by snowballs. A security guard tried to intervene, only to be pelted himself; the fan was ultimately chased out of the stadium. Eventually, the snowballs began making their way out of the stands and onto the field of play, which made an already dangerous situation significantly worse as the safety of the players and coaches of both teams was in jeopardy due to the frozen projectiles coming from the crowd. For example, an NBC cameraman mounted on a platform that followed the play along the Chargers sideline was frequently hit with snowballs. In all, ten of the stadium's security guards were injured, fourteen fans were arrested, and 175 were removed from the stadium. Things got so out of control that Chargers players did not remove their helmets once they reached the sideline for concern that they might be struck in their heads. Will McDonough, who as noted above was reporting on the sidelines, had to hide under a kicking net so he could avoid being hit with the icy projectiles.

Early in the fourth quarter, Chargers equipment manager Sid Brooks was hit in the face with a snowball and fell face first onto the stadium's hard artificial surface. Moments earlier, referee Ron Blum had decided to call a halt to the action and make an appeal for the fans to stop throwing snow. Using the Chargers' sideline phone system, Blum called Giants public address announcer Bob Sheppard in his booth while two Chargers assistants stood near him holding clipboards over his head so that he would not be struck as well. Blum told Sheppard that unless the snowball throwing stopped, he would forfeit the game to the Chargers.

Before play resumed, Sheppard admonished the fans for their actions and warned of a possible forfeit. The snowballs kept flying, especially as Gayle returned his interception for the winning touchdown, but the game was played to its conclusion. Reeves, in his postgame interview, said that he would not have objected to a forfeit, saying that the fans who were throwing snowballs "had no respect for human life." Giants owner Wellington Mara agreed, saying he would have accepted a forfeit. The Giants and the New Jersey Sports and Exposition Authority, owners of Giants Stadium, took out a full-page advertisement in the San Diego Union-Tribune apologizing to the Chargers for the incident "on behalf of the 99.99% of Giants fans who are the best fans in sports," and the league decided not to discipline them.

During the game, an Associated Press photographer snapped a photo of a man in a brown coat throwing a snowball. The Giants and the New Jersey Sports and Exposition Authority asked for assistance in identifying him, offering a reward. After fifteen people notified the team that they knew the man, New Jersey State Police arrested 26-year-old Jeffrey Lange from Readington, New Jersey, on December 27. Facing a judge on January 3, 1996, Lange pleaded innocent to charges of improper behavior, claiming that he was being scapegoated for the entire incident and that the unwelcome publicity had cost him his job. Lange was eventually convicted in April 1996 in East Rutherford municipal court and received a fine, which he appealed. The Bergen County Superior Court affirmed the verdict in August 1996.

== Aftermath ==
The Giants-Chargers game was one of two to take place at Giants Stadium that weekend, with the New York Jets hosting to the New Orleans Saints in their season finale the following day. There were no further snow throwing incidents that weekend as the remaining snow was cleared from the stands before kickoff.

The Chargers' win resulted in the team advancing to the playoffs as the highest seeded wild-card team, and they earned a home game in the playoffs. They were defeated by the Indianapolis Colts, however, and did not return to the postseason afterward until 2004.

The Giants’ 5–11 finish was their worst since Bill Parcells’ rookie year as coach in 1983, when they went 3–12–1. The team decided, in spite of their regression from the prior season when they went 9–7 and barely missed the playoffs, to retain the services of Dan Reeves as head coach for 1996; he would be fired after that season after compiling a 6-10 record.

Rodney Culver's touchdown was his third rushing touchdown of the season and the last of his NFL career. On May 11, 1996, Culver was aboard ValuJet Flight 592 when it crashed into the Florida Everglades following a fire in the cabin, killing everyone on the aircraft.

Two weeks after this game, the New York metropolitan received its fourth significant storm in the span of a month. This time, it was the Blizzard of 1996, which saw over two feet of new snow fall over the area surrounding the Meadowlands.
