= Sherard (name) =

Sherard is both a surname and a given name. Notable people with the name include:

== Surname ==
- Bennet Sherard (disambiguation), multiple people
- James Sherard (1666–1738), English apothecary, botanist and amateur musician
- Michael Sherard (1910–1998), British fashion designer
- Philip Sherard (disambiguation), multiple people
- Robert Sherard (1861–1943), English writer and journalist
- William Sherard (1659–1728), English botanist
- William Sherard, 1st Baron Sherard (1588–1640), English courtier

== Given name ==
- Sherard Cowper-Coles (born 1955), British diplomat
- Lord Sherard Manners (c. 1713–1742), English nobleman and Member of Parliament
- Sherard Osborn Cowper-Coles (1866–1936), British metallurgist and grandfather of Sherard Cowper-Coles
- Sherard Osborn (1822–1875), British Royal Navy admiral and explorer
- Sherard Parker (born 1980), Canadian actor
- Sherard Vines (1890–1974), English writer and academic

== See also ==
- Sherrard (name)
