= 1995 New York Giants season =

NFL team season

- Head coach: Dan Reeves
- Home stadium: Giants Stadium

Results
- Record: 5–11
- Division place: 4th NFC East
- Playoffs: Did not qualify
- Pro Bowlers: None

The 1995 New York Giants season was the franchise's 71st season in the National Football League (NFL) and the third under head coach Dan Reeves. The Giants finished in fourth place in the National Football Conference East Division with a 5–11 record, failing to improve on their 9–7 record from 1994.

During one notable game at the end of the season, against the San Diego Chargers, Giants fans threw snowballs onto the field throughout the contest. This action resulted in 15 arrests and the ejection of 175 fans from Giants Stadium; San Diego posted a 27–17 victory in what became known as the "Snowball Game".

== Offseason ==
=== 1995 expansion draft ===
New York Giants selected during the expansion draft
Round	Overall	Name	Position	Expansion team
2	3	Corey Raymond	CB	Jacksonville Jaguars
12	24	Andre Powell	LB	Carolina Panthers
24	47	Derek Brown	TE	Jacksonville Jaguars

=== NFL draft ===
1995 New York Giants draft
Round	Pick	Player	Position	College	Notes
1	17	Tyrone Wheatley	RB	Michigan	
2	54	Scott Gragg	T	Montana	
3	85	Rodney Young	DB	LSU	
4	128	Rob Zatechka	G	Nebraska	
4	133	Ben Talley	LB	Tennessee	
5	153	Roderick Mullen	CB	Grambling State	
6	204	Jamal Duff	DE	San Diego State	
6	206	Charles Way	FB	Virginia	
7	225	Bryne Diehl	P	Alabama	
Made roster † Pro Football Hall of Fame * Made at least one Pro Bowl during career

=== Undrafted free agents ===
1995 undrafted free agents of note
Player	Position	College
Derek Allen	Guard	Illinois
Geoff Bander	Quarterback	NC State
Jeremy Burkett	Wide Receiver	Colorado State
Chris Mazyck	Defensive tackle	Penn State

=== Transactions ===
- July 29: The Giants signed Jessie Armstead

== Personnel ==
=== Staff ===
1995 New York Giants staff
Head coaches: Head coach – Dan Reeves; Offensive coaches: Offensive coordinator – George Henshaw; Quarterbacks – Steve DeBerg; Running backs – George Sefcik; Wide receivers – Dick Rehbein; Tight ends – James Daniel; Offensive line – Pete Mangurian	Defensive coaches: Defensive coordinator – Mike Nolan; Defensive line – Earl Leggett; Linebackers – Don Blackmon; Defensive backs – Zaven Yaralian; Special teams coaches: Special teams – Joe DeCamillis; Strength and conditioning: Strength and conditioning – Al Miller; Asst. strength and conditioning – Kerry Goode

=== Roster ===
1995 New York Giants roster
Quarterbacks (QB): 17 Dave Brown; 12 Tommy Maddox; 8 Stan White; Running backs (RB): 20 Keith Elias; 27 Rodney Hampton; 34 Herschel Walker KR; 30 Charles Way; 28 Tyrone Wheatley KR; Wide receivers (WR): 80 Chris Calloway; 82 Omar Douglas; 89 Gary Harrell PR; 81 Thomas Lewis; 86 Arthur Marshall PR; 88 Mike Sherrard; Tight ends (TE): 87 Howard Cross; 85 Brian Kozlowski; 84 Aaron Pierce	Offensive linemen (OL): 69 Derek Allen G; 78 Greg Bishop G; 76 Jumbo Elliott T; 74 Scott Gragg T; 66 Jerry Reynolds G/T; 72 Doug Riesenberg T; 67 Adam Schreiber C; 61 Lance Smith G; 59 Brian Williams C; 73 Rob Zatechka G; Defensive linemen (DL): 93 Ray Agnew DT; 77 Chad Bratzke DE; 71 Stacey Dillard DT; 96 Jamal Duff DE; 75 Keith Hamilton DT; 97 Robert Harris DE; 91 Coleman Rudolph DE; 92 Michael Strahan DE; 79 Todd Yeaman DT	Linebackers (LB): 98 Jessie Armstead OLB; 94 Michael Brooks MLB; 55 Marcus Buckley OLB; 51 Mike Croel OLB; 57 Corey Miller OLB; 54 Ben Talley OLB; 90 Corey Widmer MLB; Defensive backs (DB): 21 Willie Beamon CB; 37 Jesse Campbell SS; 25 Vencie Glenn FS; 23 Thomas Randolph CB; 31 Jason Sehorn CB; 22 Phillippi Sparks CB; 29 Tito Wooten FS; 47 Rodney Young SS; Special teams (ST): 3 Brad Daluiso K; 2 Mike Horan P	Practice squad: 26 Jeremy Burkett TE; 36 Akili Johnson CB; 48 Brian Saxton TE; Reserve: 62 Scott Davis G (IR); 24 Maurice Douglass S (IR); Rookies in italics 53 active, 2 reserve, 3 practice squad

== Preseason ==
Week	Date	Opponent	Result	Record	Venue
1	August 6	at Cleveland Browns	W 19–13	1–0	Cleveland Municipal Stadium
2	August 11	New Orleans Saints	W 14–13	2–0	Giants Stadium
3	August 19	New York Jets	W 32–31	3–0	Giants Stadium
4	August 26	at Carolina Panthers	L 3–6	3–1	Memorial Stadium

== Regular season ==
=== Schedule ===
Week	Date	Opponent	Result	Record	Venue	Recap
1	September 4	**Dallas Cowboys**	**L** 0–35	0–1	Giants Stadium	Recap
2	September 10	at Kansas City Chiefs	**L** 17–20 (OT)	0–2	Arrowhead Stadium	Recap
3	September 17	at Green Bay Packers	**L** 6–14	0–3	Lambeau Field	Recap
4	September 24	New Orleans Saints	**W** 45–29	1–3	Giants Stadium	Recap
5	October 1	at San Francisco 49ers	**L** 6–20	1–4	3Com Park	Recap
6	October 8	**Arizona Cardinals**	**W** 27–21 (OT)	2–4	Giants Stadium	Recap
7	October 15	**Philadelphia Eagles**	**L** 14–17	2–5	Giants Stadium	Recap
8	Bye					
9	October 29	at **Washington Redskins**	**W** 24–15	3–5	RFK Stadium	Recap
10	November 5	at Seattle Seahawks	**L** 28–30	3–6	Kingdome	Recap
11	November 12	Oakland Raiders	**L** 13–17	3–7	Giants Stadium	Recap
12	November 19	at **Philadelphia Eagles**	**L** 19–28	3–8	Veterans Stadium	Recap
13	November 26	Chicago Bears	**L** 24–27	3–9	Giants Stadium	Recap
14	November 30	at **Arizona Cardinals**	**W** 10–6	4–9	Sun Devil Stadium	Recap
15	December 10	**Washington Redskins**	**W** 20–13	5–9	Giants Stadium	Recap
16	December 17	at **Dallas Cowboys**	**L** 20–21	5–10	Texas Stadium	Recap
17	December 23	San Diego Chargers	**L** 17–27	5–11	Giants Stadium	Recap
Note: Intra-division opponents are in **bold** text.

=== Game summaries ===
==== Week 1: vs. Dallas Cowboys ====
Week 1: Dallas Cowboys at New York Giants – Game summary

Quarter	1	2	3	4	Total
**Cowboys**	7	14	7	7	**35**
Giants	0	0	0	0	**0**

at Giants Stadium, East Rutherford, New Jersey

- Date: September 4
- Game time: 9:00 p.m. EDT
- Game weather: Scattered clouds, 75 °F (24 °C)
- Game attendance: 77,454
- Referee: Bob McElwee
- TV announcers (ABC): Al Michaels, Frank Gifford, Dan Dierdorf and Lynn Swann

Game information

**First quarter**

- DAL – Emmitt Smith 60-yard run (Chris Boniol kick), 11:56. Cowboys 7–0.

**Second quarter**

- DAL – Michael Irvin 7-yard pass from Troy Aikman (Chris Boniol kick), 11:58. Cowboys 14–0.
- DAL – Emmitt Smith 1-yard run (Chris Boniol kick), 6:52. Cowboys 21–0.

**Third quarter**

- DAL – Emmitt Smith 1-yard run (Chris Boniol kick), 11:03. Cowboys 28–0.

**Fourth quarter**

- DAL – Emmitt Smith 1-yard run (Chris Boniol kick), 12:33. Cowboys 35–0.

**Top passers**

- DAL – Troy Aikman – 15/20, 228 yards, TD
- NYG – Dave Brown – 20/34, 155 yards, INT

**Top rushers**

- DAL – Emmitt Smith – 21 rushes, 163 yards, 4 TD
- NYG – Rodney Hampton – 14 rushes, 48 yards

**Top receivers**

- DAL – Michael Irvin – 7 receptions, 109 yards, TD
- NYG – Chris Calloway – 3 receptions, 35 yards

==== Week 2: at Kansas City Chiefs ====
Week 2: New York Giants at Kansas City Chiefs – Game summary

Quarter	1	2	3	4	OT	Total
Giants	7	3	0	7	0	**17**
**Chiefs**	3	0	0	14	3	**20**

at Arrowhead Stadium, Kansas City, Missouri

- Date: September 10
- Game time: 1:00 p.m. EDT/12:00 p.m. CDT
- Game weather: Mostly cloudy, 61 °F (16 °C)
- Game attendance: 77,962
- Referee: Bernie Kukar
- TV announcers (Fox): Pat Summerall and John Madden

Game information

**First quarter**

- NYG – Chris Calloway 26-yard pass from Dave Brown (Brad Daluiso kick), 12:05. Giants 7–0.
- KC – Lin Elliott 42-yard field goal, 5:24. Giants 7–3.

**Second quarter**

- NYG – Brad Daluiso 23-yard field goal, 14:37. Giants 10–3.

**Third quarter**

- No scoring plays.

**Fourth quarter**

- NYG – Tito Wooten 1-yard fumble return (Brad Daluiso kick), 10:56. Giants 17–3.
- KC – Marcus Allen 1-yard run (Lin Elliott kick), 5:03. Giants 17–10.
- KC – Danan Hughes 3-yard pass from Steve Bono (Lin Elliott kick), 1:22. Tied 17–17.

**Overtime**

- KC – Lin Elliott 23-yard field goal, 7:11. Chiefs 20–17.

**Top passers**

- NYG – Dave Brown – 10/14, 151 yards, TD
- KC – Steve Bono – 29/47, 183 yards, TD, INT

**Top rushers**

- NYG – Rodney Hampton – 26 rushes, 79 yards
- KC – Marcus Allen – 19 rushes, 86 yards, TD

**Top receivers**

- NYG – Chris Calloway – 5 receptions, 100 yards, TD
- KC – Kimble Anders – 11 receptions, 68 yards

==== Week 3: at Green Bay Packers ====
Week 3: New York Giants at Green Bay Packers – Game summary

Quarter	1	2	3	4	Total
Giants	0	3	0	3	**6**
**Packers**	7	7	0	0	**14**

at Lambeau Field, Green Bay, Wisconsin

- Date: September 17
- Game time: 1:00 p.m. EDT/12:00 p.m. CDT
- Game weather: Partly cloudy, 57 °F (14 °C)
- Game attendance: 60,117
- Referee: Johnny Grier
- TV announcers (Fox): Pat Summerall and John Madden

Game information

**First quarter**

- GB – Mark Ingram 11-yard pass from Brett Favre (Craig Hentrich kick), 10:10. Packers 7–0.

**Second quarter**

- GB – Robert Brooks 19-yard pass from Brett Favre (Craig Hentrich kick), 9:06. Packers 14–0.
- NYG – Brad Daluiso 37-yard field goal, 5:46. Packers 14–3.

**Third quarter**

- No scoring plays.

**Fourth quarter**

- NYG – Brad Daluiso 32-yard field goal, 3:21. Packers 14–6.

**Top passers**

- NYG – Dave Brown – 23/50, 199 yards, INT
- GB – Brett Favre – 14/25, 141 yards, 2 TD

**Top rushers**

- NYG – Rodney Hampton – 16 rushes, 86 yards
- GB – Edgar Bennett – 23 rushes, 87 yards

**Top receivers**

- NYG – Mike Sherrard – 7 receptions, 74 yards
- GB – Robert Brooks – 5 receptions, 47 yards, TD

==== Week 4: vs. New Orleans Saints ====
Week 4: New Orleans Saints at New York Giants – Game summary

Quarter	1	2	3	4	Total
Saints	7	10	0	12	**29**
**Giants**	7	17	14	7	**45**

at Giants Stadium, East Rutherford, New Jersey

- Date: September 24
- Game time: 1:00 p.m. EDT
- Game weather: Mostly cloudy, 58 °F (14 °C)
- Game attendance: 72,619
- Referee: Dick Hantak
- TV announcers (Fox): Kevin Harlan, Jerry Glanville and Eric Clemons

Game information

**First quarter**

- NYG – Rodney Hampton 1-yard run (Brad Daluiso kick), 10:10. Giants 7–0.
- NO – Mario Bates 3-yard run (Chip Lohmiller kick), 7:42. Tied 7–7.

**Second quarter**

- NO – Wesley Walls 9-yard pass from Jim Everett (Chip Lohmiller kick), 13:07. Saints 14–7.
- NYG – Rodney Hampton 5-yard run (Brad Daluiso kick), 10:01. Tied 14–14.
- NO – Chip Lohmiller 20-yard field goal, 7:11. Saints 17–14.
- NYG – Chris Calloway 38-yard pass from Dave Brown (Brad Daluiso kick), 2:09. Giants 21–17.
- NYG – Brad Daluiso 50-yard field goal, 0:00. Giants 24–17.

**Third quarter**

- NYG – Rodney Hampton 2-yard run (Brad Daluiso kick), 12:06. Giants 31–17.
- NYG – Rodney Hampton 3-yard run (Brad Daluiso kick), 1:29. Giants 38–17.

**Fourth quarter**

- NO – Torrance Small 1-yard pass from Jim Everett (kick failed), 11:33. Giants 38–23.
- NYG – Tyrone Wheatley 19-yard run (Brad Daluiso kick), 4:35. Giants 45–23.
- NO – Derek Brown 4-yard pass from Jim Everett (pass failed), 1:46. Giants 45–29.

**Top passers**

- NO – Jim Everett – 19/32, 256 yards, 3 TD, 2 INT
- NYG – Dave Brown – 19/27, 258 yards, TD, INT

**Top rushers**

- NO – Mario Bates – 10 rushes, 57 yards, TD
- NYG – Rodney Hampton – 33 rushes, 149 yards, 4 TD

**Top receivers**

- NO – Michael Haynes – 4 receptions, 68 yards
- NYG – Chris Calloway – 5 receptions, 95 yards, TD

==== Week 5: at San Francisco 49ers ====
Week 5: New York Giants at San Francisco 49ers – Game summary

Quarter	1	2	3	4	Total
Giants	3	0	3	0	**6**
**49ers**	3	14	3	0	**20**

at 3Com Park, San Francisco, California

- Date: October 1
- Game time: 4:00 p.m. EDT/1:00 p.m. PDT
- Game weather: Sunny, 64 °F (18 °C)
- Game attendance: 65,536
- Referee: Howard Roe
- TV announcers (Fox): Pat Summerall and John Madden

Game information

**First quarter**

- NYG – Brad Daluiso 37-yard field goal, 11:34. Giants 3–0.
- SF – Doug Brien 22-yard field goal, 3:05. Tied 3–3.

**Second quarter**

- SF – William Floyd 1-yard run (Doug Brien kick), 1:57. 49ers 10–3.
- SF – Jerry Rice 16-yard pass from Steve Young (Doug Brien kick), 0:26. 49ers 17–3.

**Third quarter**

- SF – Doug Brien 46-yard field goal, 7:59. 49ers 20–3.
- NYG – Brad Daluiso 32-yard field goal, 0:58. 49ers 20–6.

**Fourth quarter**

- No scoring plays.

**Top passers**

- NYG – Dave Brown – 22/43, 218 yards, INT
- SF – Steve Young – 26/40, 202 yards, TD

**Top rushers**

- NYG – Tyrone Wheatley – 5 rushes, 16 yards
- SF – Derek Loville – 9 rushes, 42 yards

**Top receivers**

- NYG – Chris Calloway – 4 receptions, 46 yards
- SF – Jerry Rice – 7 receptions, 71 yards

==== Week 6: vs. Arizona Cardinals ====
Week 6: Arizona Cardinals at New York Giants – Game summary

Quarter	1	2	3	4	OT	Total
Cardinals	3	7	11	0	0	**21**
**Giants**	7	0	7	7	6	**27**

at Giants Stadium, East Rutherford, New Jersey

- Date: October 8
- Game time: 4:00 p.m. EDT
- Game weather: Scattered clouds, 64 °F (18 °C)
- Game attendance: 68,463
- Referee: Gordon McCarter
- TV announcers (Fox): Dick Stockton and Matt Millen

Game information

**First quarter**

- ARI – Greg Davis 23-yard field goal, 9:29. Cardinals 3–0.
- NYG – Mike Sherrard 6-yard pass from Dave Brown (Brad Daluiso kick), 3:34. Giants 7–3.

**Second quarter**

- ARI – Frank Sanders 11-yard pass from Dave Krieg (Greg Davis kick), 9:01. Cardinals 10–7.

**Third quarter**

- ARI – Greg Davis 36-yard field goal, 9:06. Cardinals 13–7.
- NYG – Charles Way 2-yard pass from Dave Brown (Brad Daluiso kick), 4:08. Giants 14–13.
- ARI – Frank Sanders 6-yard pass from Dave Krieg (Krieg-Sanders pass), 0:47. Cardinals 21–14.

**Fourth quarter**

- NYG – Dave Brown 2-yard run (Brad Daluiso kick), 12:53. Tied 21–21.

**Overtime**

- NYG – Jessie Armstead 58-yard interception return, 10:55. Giants 27–21.

**Top passers**

- ARI – Dave Krieg – 23/38, 305 yards, 2 TD, INT
- NYG – Dave Brown – 14/23, 166 yards, 2 TD, 2 INT

**Top rushers**

- ARI – Garrison Hearst – 23 rushes, 122 yards
- NYG – Tyrone Wheatley – 18 rushes, 61 yards

**Top receivers**

- ARI – Frank Sanders – 6 receptions, 108 yards, 2 TD
- NYG – Chris Calloway – 3 receptions, 78 yards

==== Week 7: vs. Philadelphia Eagles ====
Week 7: Philadelphia Eagles at New York Giants – Game summary

Quarter	1	2	3	4	Total
**Eagles**	0	14	0	3	**17**
Giants	0	6	0	8	**14**

at Giants Stadium, East Rutherford, New Jersey

- Date: October 15
- Game time: 1:00 p.m. EDT
- Game weather: Cloudy, 61 °F (16 °C)
- Game attendance: 74,252
- Referee: Ron Blum
- TV announcers (Fox): Kevin Harlan and Jerry Glanville

Game information

**First quarter**

- No scoring plays.

**Second quarter**

- PHI – Ricky Watters 3-yard run (Gary Anderson kick), 14:34. Eagles 7–0.
- PHI – Michael Zordich 58-yard fumble return (Gary Anderson kick), 10:04. Eagles 14–0.
- NYG – Brad Daluiso 20-yard field goal, 6:58. Eagles 14–3.
- NYG – Brad Daluiso 21-yard field goal, 0:02. Eagles 14–6.

**Third quarter**

- No scoring plays.

**Fourth quarter**

- PHI – Gary Anderson 40-yard field goal, 10:25. Eagles 17–6.
- NYG – Omar Douglas 41-yard fumble return (Rodney Hampton run), 4:45. Eagles 17–14.

**Top passers**

- PHI – Rodney Peete – 4/7, 47 yards
- NYG – Dave Brown – 9/18, 82 yards

**Top rushers**

- PHI – Ricky Watters – 30 rushes, 122 yards, TD
- NYG – Rodney Hampton – 14 rushes, 58 yards

**Top receivers**

- PHI – Charlie Garner – 1 reception, 29 yards
- NYG – Chris Calloway – 4 receptions, 47 yards

==== Week 9: at Washington Redskins ====
Week 9: New York Giants at Washington Redskins – Game summary

Quarter	1	2	3	4	Total
**Giants**	7	17	0	0	**24**
Redskins	3	3	6	3	**15**

at RFK Stadium, Washington, D.C.

- Date: October 29
- Game time: 8:00 p.m. EST
- Game weather: Clear, 52 °F (11 °C)
- Game attendance: 53,310
- Referee: Bob McElwee
- TV announcers (TNT): Verne Lundquist, Pat Haden and Ernie Johnson

Game information

**First quarter**

- NYG – Vencie Glenn 75-yard interception return (Brad Daluiso kick), 12:13. Giants 7–0.
- WAS – Eddie Murray 47-yard field goal, 9:19. Giants 7–3.

**Second quarter**

- NYG – Tyrone Wheatley 1-yard run (Brad Daluiso kick), 10:51. Giants 14–3.
- NYG – Mike Sherrard 57-yard pass from Dave Brown (Brad Daluiso kick), 9:12. Giants 21–3.
- NYG – Brad Daluiso 31-yard field goal, 1:06. Giants 24–3.
- WAS – Scott Blanton 52-yard field goal, 0:05. Giants 24–6.

**Third quarter**

- WAS – Marc Logan 2-yard run (run failed), 4:47. Giants 24–12.

**Fourth quarter**

- WAS – Eddie Murray 27-yard field goal, 13:36. Giants 24–15.

**Top passers**

- NYG – Dave Brown – 11/22, 139 yards, TD
- WAS – Gus Frerotte – 22/44, 345 yards, 4 INT

**Top rushers**

- NYG – Rodney Hampton – 17 rushes, 83 yards
- WAS – Terry Allen – 15 rushes, 56 yards

**Top receivers**

- NYG – Mike Sherrard – 3 receptions, 79 yards, TD
- WAS – Leslie Shepherd – 7 receptions, 135 yards

==== Week 10: at Seattle Seahawks ====
Week 10: New York Giants at Seattle Seahawks – Game summary

Quarter	1	2	3	4	Total
Giants	3	19	0	6	**28**
**Seahawks**	21	0	3	6	**30**

at Kingdome, Seattle, Washington

- Date: November 5
- Game time: 4:00 p.m. EST/1:00 p.m. PST
- Game weather: None (indoor stadium)
- Game attendance: 42,100
- Referee: Ed Hochuli
- TV announcers (Fox): Joe Buck and Tim Green

Game information

**First quarter**

- SEA – Brian Blades 33-yard pass from Rick Mirer (Todd Peterson kick), 10:00. Seahawks 7–0.
- NYG – Brad Daluiso 23-yard field goal, 6:16. Seahawks 7–3.
- SEA – Brian Blades 44-yard pass from Rick Mirer (Todd Peterson kick), 4:11. Seahawks 14–3.
- SEA – Joey Galloway 89-yard punt return (Todd Peterson kick), 0:39. Seahawks 21–3.

**Second quarter**

- NYG – Herschel Walker 8-yard pass from Dave Brown (Brad Daluiso kick), 11:40. Seahawks 21–10.
- NYG – Mike Sherrard 28-yard pass from Dave Brown (run failed), 1:55. Seahawks 21–16.
- NYG – Rodney Hampton 1-yard run (pass failed), 0:32. Giants 22–21.

**Third quarter**

- SEA – Todd Peterson 23-yard field goal, 10:30. Seahawks 24–22.

**Fourth quarter**

- SEA – Todd Peterson 41-yard field goal, 13:33. Seahawks 27–22.
- NYG – Rodney Hampton 1-yard run (pass failed), 8:15. Giants 28–27.
- SEA – Todd Peterson 32-yard field goal, 1:27. Seahawks 30–28.

**Top passers**

- NYG – Dave Brown – 20/41, 299 yards, 2 TD
- SEA – Rick Mirer – 17/31, 253 yards, 2 TD, INT

**Top rushers**

- NYG – Rodney Hampton – 18 rushes, 54 yards, 2 TD
- SEA – Lamar Smith – 19 rushes, 84 yards

**Top receivers**

- NYG – Mike Sherrard – 6 receptions, 128 yards, TD
- SEA – Brian Blades – 6 receptions, 153 yards, 2 TD

==== Week 11: vs. Oakland Raiders ====
Week 11: Oakland Raiders at New York Giants – Game summary

Quarter	1	2	3	4	Total
**Raiders**	3	7	0	7	**17**
Giants	0	3	10	0	**13**

at Giants Stadium, East Rutherford, New Jersey

- Date: November 12
- Game time: 1:00 p.m. EST
- Game weather: Mostly cloudy, 47 °F (8 °C)
- Game attendance: 71,170
- Referee: Tom White
- TV announcers (NBC): Dick Enberg, Paul Maguire and Phil Simms

Game information

**First quarter**

- OAK – Jeff Jaeger 30-yard field goal, 6:35. Raiders 3–0.

**Second quarter**

- OAK – Raghib Ismail 40-yard pass from Jeff Hostetler (Jeff Jaeger kick), 13:22. Raiders 10–0.
- NYG – Brad Daluiso 32-yard field goal, 10:31. Raiders 10–3.

**Third quarter**

- NYG – Brad Daluiso 32-yard field goal, 10:56. Raiders 10–6.
- NYG – Dave Brown 11-yard run (Brad Daluiso kick), 5:39. Giants 13–10.

**Fourth quarter**

- OAK – Harvey Williams 6-yard run (Jeff Jaeger kick), 6:52. Raiders 17–13.

**Top passers**

- OAK – Jeff Hostetler – 13/19, 152 yards, TD, INT
- NYG – Dave Brown – 18/31, 215 yards

**Top rushers**

- OAK – Harvey Williams – 21 rushes, 85 yards, TD
- NYG – Rodney Hampton – 14 rushes, 44 yards

**Top receivers**

- OAK – Raghib Ismail – 3 receptions, 54 yards, TD
- NYG – Chris Calloway – 5 receptions, 60 yards

==== Week 12: at Philadelphia Eagles ====
Week 12: New York Giants at Philadelphia Eagles – Game summary

Quarter	1	2	3	4	Total
Giants	7	0	3	9	**19**
**Eagles**	14	7	7	0	**28**

at Veterans Stadium, Philadelphia, Pennsylvania

- Date: November 19
- Game time: 1:00 p.m. EST
- Game weather: Overcast, 44 °F (7 °C)
- Game attendance: 63,562
- Referee: Johnny Grier
- TV announcers (Fox): Kevin Harlan and Jerry Glanville

Game information

**First quarter**

- NYG – Thomas Lewis 46-yard pass from Dave Brown (Brad Daluiso kick), 10:41. Giants 7–0.
- PHI – Fred Barnett 13-yard pass from Rodney Peete (Gary Anderson kick), 9:25. Tied 7–7.
- PHI – Ricky Watters 3-yard run (Gary Anderson kick), 5:49. Eagles 14–7.

**Second quarter**

- PHI – Fred Barnett 4-yard pass from Rodney Peete (Gary Anderson kick), 8:29. Eagles 21–7.

**Third quarter**

- NYG – Brad Daluiso 44-yard field goal, 10:52. Eagles 21–10.
- PHI – Ricky Watters 1-yard run (Gary Anderson kick), 6:15. Eagles 28–10.

**Fourth quarter**

- NYG – Rodney Hampton 1-yard run (Brad Daluiso kick), 14:57. Giants 28–17.
- NYG – Punt blocked by Michael Strahan out of bounds in end zone for a safety, 11:16. Eagles 28–19.

**Top passers**

- NYG – Dave Brown – 13/25, 160 yards, TD, 2 INT
- PHI – Rodney Peete – 14/20, 133 yards, 2 TD, INT

**Top rushers**

- NYG – Rodney Hampton – 21 rushes, 84 yards, TD
- PHI – Ricky Watters – 20 rushes, 84 yards, 2 TD

**Top receivers**

- NYG – Thomas Lewis – 7 receptions, 126 yards, TD
- PHI – Calvin Williams – 4 receptions, 57 yards

==== Week 13: vs. Chicago Bears ====
Week 13: Chicago Bears at New York Giants – Game summary

Quarter	1	2	3	4	Total
**Bears**	7	7	3	10	**27**
Giants	7	7	3	7	**24**

at Giants Stadium, East Rutherford, New Jersey

- Date: November 26
- Game time: 1:00 p.m. EST
- Game weather: Light rain, 40 °F (4 °C)
- Game attendance: 70,015
- Referee: Gordon McCarter
- TV announcers (Fox): Pat Summerall and John Madden

Game information

**First quarter**

- CHI – Michael Timpson 6-yard run (Kevin Butler kick), 7:34. Bears 7–0.
- NYG – Arthur Marshall 5-yard pass from Dave Brown (Brad Daluiso kick), 3:41. Tied 7–7.

**Second quarter**

- NYG – Rodney Hampton 1-yard run (Brad Daluiso kick), 4:40. Giants 14–7.
- CHI – Jeff Graham 6-yard pass from Erik Kramer (Kevin Butler kick), 0:49. Tied 14–14.

**Third quarter**

- NYG – Brad Daluiso 22-yard field goal, 6:16. Giants 17–14.
- CHI – Kevin Butler 34-yard field goal, 0:47. Tied 17–17.

**Fourth quarter**

- CHI – Michael Timpson 9-yard pass from Erik Kramer (Kevin Butler kick), 11:16. Bears 24–17.
- NYG – Rodney Hampton 2-yard run (Brad Daluiso kick), 6:27. Tied 24–24.
- CHI – Kevin Butler 37-yard field goal, 0:07. Bears 27–24.

**Top passers**

- CHI – Erik Kramer – 25/38, 268 yards, 2 TD
- NYG – Dave Brown – 17/33, 217 yards, TD

**Top rushers**

- CHI – Rashaan Salaam – 17 rushes, 76 yards
- NYG – Rodney Hampton – 22 rushes, 69 yards, 2 TD

**Top receivers**

- CHI – Curtis Conway – 6 receptions, 89 yards
- NYG – Thomas Lewis – 3 receptions, 77 yards

==== Week 14: at Arizona Cardinals ====
Week 14: New York Giants at Arizona Cardinals – Game summary

Quarter	1	2	3	4	Total
**Giants**	0	3	7	0	**10**
Cardinals	0	6	0	0	**6**

at Sun Devil Stadium, Tucson, Arizona

- Date: November 30
- Game time: 8:00 p.m. EST/6:00 p.m. MST
- Game weather: Clear, 60 °F (16 °C)
- Game attendance: 44,246
- Referee: Jerry Markbreit
- TV announcers (ESPN): Mike Patrick, Joe Theismann and Mark Malone

Game information

**First quarter**

- No scoring plays.

**Second quarter**

- ARI – Greg Davis 44-yard field goal, 13:32. Cardinals 3–0.
- ARI – Greg Davis 28-yard field goal, 3:05. Cardinals 6–0.
- NYG – Brad Daluiso 51-yard field goal, 0:15. Cardinals 6–3.

**Third quarter**

- NYG – Mike Sherrard 12-yard pass from Dave Brown (Brad Daluiso kick), 8:12. Giants 10–6.

**Fourth quarter**

- No scoring plays.

**Top passers**

- NYG – Dave Brown – 17/27, 144 yards, TD
- ARI – Dave Krieg – 22/37, 235 yards, INT

**Top rushers**

- NYG – Rodney Hampton – 18 rushes, 43 yards
- ARI – Garrison Hearst – 21 rushes, 85 yards

**Top receivers**

- NYG – Chris Calloway – 7 receptions, 71 yards
- ARI – Frank Sanders – 6 receptions, 84 yards

==== Week 15: vs. Washington Redskins ====
Week 15: Washington Redskins at New York Giants – Game summary

Quarter	1	2	3	4	Total
Redskins	0	3	0	10	**13**
**Giants**	3	10	0	7	**20**

at Giants Stadium, East Rutherford, New Jersey

- Date: December 10
- Game time: 4:00 p.m. EST
- Game weather: Partly sunny, 26 °F (−3 °C)
- Game attendance: 48,247
- Referee: Gerry Austin
- TV announcers (Fox): Joe Buck and Tim Green

Game information

**First quarter**

- NYG – Brad Daluiso 36-yard field goal, 1:45. Giants 3–0.

**Second quarter**

- WAS – Eddie Murray 34-yard field goal, 12:18. Tied 3–3.
- NYG – Thomas Lewis 90-yard kickoff return (Brad Daluiso kick), 11:59. Giants 10–3.
- NYG – Brad Daluiso 42-yard field goal, 1:11. Giants 13–3.

**Third quarter**

- No scoring plays.

**Fourth quarter**

- WAS – Eddie Murray 30-yard field goal, 14:49. Giants 13–6.
- WAS – Terry Allen 1-yard run (Eddie Murray kick), 3:35. Tied 13–13.
- NYG – Chris Calloway 40-yard pass from Dave Brown (Brad Daluiso kick), 1:12. Giants 20–13.

**Top passers**

- WAS – Heath Shuler – 17/32, 175 yards, INT
- NYG – Dave Brown – 10/12, 91 yards, TD

**Top rushers**

- WAS – Terry Allen – 30 rushes, 120 yards, TD
- NYG – Rodney Hampton – 18 rushes, 78 yards

**Top receivers**

- WAS – Jamie Asher – 4 receptions, 50 yards
- NYG – Chris Calloway – 2 receptions, 56 yards, TD

==== Week 16: at Dallas Cowboys ====
Week 16: New York Giants at Dallas Cowboys – Game summary

Quarter	1	2	3	4	Total
Giants	0	14	0	6	**20**
**Cowboys**	3	3	6	9	**21**

at Texas Stadium, Irving, Texas

- Date: December 17
- Game time: 4:00 p.m. EST/3:00 p.m. CST
- Game weather: Light rain, 52 °F (11 °C)
- Game attendance: 64,400
- Referee: Red Cashion
- TV announcers (Fox): Pat Summerall and John Madden

Game information

**First quarter**

- DAL – Chris Boniol 27-yard field goal, 10:19. Cowboys 3–0.

**Second quarter**

- NYG – Tyrone Wheatley 1-yard run (Brad Daluiso kick), 10:35. Giants 7–3.
- DAL – Chris Boniol 32-yard field goal, 5:18. Giants 7–6.
- NYG – Dave Brown 5-yard run (Brad Daluiso kick), 0:14. Giants 14–6.

**Third quarter**

- DAL – Chris Boniol 23-yard field goal, 11:13. Giants 14–9.
- DAL – Chris Boniol 45-yard field goal, 4:43. Giants 14–12.

**Fourth quarter**

- NYG – Brad Daluiso 20-yard field goal, 14:53. Giants 17–12.
- DAL – Emmitt Smith 5-yard run (pass failed), 12:48. Cowboys 18–17.
- NYG – Brad Daluiso 27-yard field goal, 5:17. Giants 20–18.
- DAL – Chris Boniol 35-yard field goal, 0:00. Cowboys 21–20.

**Top passers**

- NYG – Dave Brown – 10/20, 111 yards, INT
- DAL – Troy Aikman – 16/34, 222 yards, INT

**Top rushers**

- NYG – Rodney Hampton – 34 rushes, 187 yards
- DAL – Emmitt Smith – 24 rushes, 103 yards, TD

**Top receivers**

- NYG – Mike Sherrard – 2 receptions, 35 yards
- DAL – Michael Irvin – 5 receptions, 90 yards

==== Week 17: vs. San Diego Chargers ====
Week 17: San Diego Chargers at New York Giants – Game summary

Quarter	1	2	3	4	Total
**Chargers**	0	3	7	17	**27**
Giants	3	14	0	0	**17**

at Giants Stadium, East Rutherford, New Jersey

- Date: December 23
- Game time: 12:30 p.m. EST
- Game weather: Overcast, 34 °F (1 °C)
- Game attendance: 50,243
- Referee: Ron Blum
- TV announcers (NBC): Marv Albert, Cris Collinsworth and Will McDonough

Game information

**First quarter**

- NYG – Brad Daluiso 30-yard field goal, 3:57. Giants 3–0.

**Second quarter**

- NYG – Dave Brown 3-yard run (Brad Daluiso kick), 11:29. Giants 10–0.
- SD – John Carney 30-yard field goal, 7:04. Giants 10–3.
- NYG – Rodney Hampton 1-yard run (Brad Daluiso kick), 0:14. Giants 17–3.

**Third quarter**

- SD – Aaron Hayden 8-yard run (John Carney kick), 9:51. Giants 17–10.

**Fourth quarter**

- SD – Rodney Culver 8-yard run (John Carney kick), 9:04. Tied 17–17.
- SD – Shaun Gayle 99-yard interception return (John Carney kick), 5:44. Chargers 24–17.
- SD – John Carney 45-yard field goal, 3:37. Chargers 27–17.

**Top passers**

- SD – Gale Gilbert – 12/21, 97 yards
- NYG – Dave Brown – 21/36, 209 yards, INT

**Top rushers**

- SD – Aaron Hayden – 22 rushes, 80 yards, TD
- NYG – Rodney Hampton – 20 rushes, 60 yards, TD

**Top receivers**

- SD – Tony Martin – 4 receptions, 37 yards
- NYG – Keith Elias – 4 receptions, 46 yards

=== Standings ===
NFC East
	W	L	T	PCT	PF	PA	STK
^{(1)} Dallas Cowboys	12	4	0	.750	435	291	W2
^{(4)} Philadelphia Eagles	10	6	0	.625	318	338	L1
Washington Redskins	6	10	0	.375	326	359	W2
New York Giants	5	11	0	.313	290	340	L2
Arizona Cardinals	4	12	0	.250	275	422	L4
