= Sherard =

Sherard may refer to:

- Sherard (name)
- Sherard, Mississippi, an unincorporated community in Coahoma County, Mississippi, United States
- Sherard Bay, a waterway in Nunavut, Canada
- Baron Sherard, a former title in the Peerage of Ireland
- Sherard baronets, a former baronetcy

== See also ==
- Sherrard (disambiguation)
