= Sherrard =

Sherrard may refer to:

- Sherrard (name)
- Sherrard, Illinois
- Sherrard, West Virginia, an unincorporated community in Marshall County, West Virginia
- Sherrard Island (Queensland)

== See also ==
- Sherrard Falls, a waterfall of New South Wales, Australia
- Sherard (disambiguation)
