= History of the New York Giants (1994–present) =

The New York Giants, an American football team which currently plays in the NFL's National Football Conference, have qualified for the postseason ten times since 1994. With the retirement of Phil Simms and Lawrence Taylor—two of the most important figures in franchise history—after the 1993 season, the Giants entered a new era.

After a successful 1993 season, the Giants struggled under head coach Dan Reeves, and failed to reach the playoffs for three consecutive seasons. With the hiring of Jim Fassel as the team's new head coach in 1997, the Giants fortunes improved and they made the playoffs several times. Led by free agent acquisition quarterback Kerry Collins, the Fassel era included an appearance in Super Bowl XXXV, where they lost to the Baltimore Ravens. Although there was success, the Fassel era was also marked by inconsistency, and he was fired after the 2003 season.

Fassel was replaced by Tom Coughlin who served as head coach from 2004 to 2015. The Giants acquired quarterback Eli Manning via a draft day trade from the San Diego Chargers. Manning had been the quarterback at University of Mississippi, and was the first pick in the 2004 NFL draft. During this period standout Giants players include defensive end Michael Strahan, who set the NFL single season record in sacks in 2001, and running back Tiki Barber, who set a team record in rushing yards in 2005. The Giants made the playoffs four consecutive seasons, from 2005 to 2008 (including a Super Bowl victory during the 2007 season), but missed the playoffs in 2009 and 2010.

== New era: 1994–1996 ==
After finishing 11–5 and reaching the second round of the playoffs in 1993, the Giants took a step backwards in 1994. Phil Simms and Lawrence Taylor, the two biggest figures of the 1980s and early 1990s, both retired. Several other key starting players were dropped from the roster due to free agency. In the wake of Simms' retirement, head coach Dan Reeves named Dave Brown, who had been a No. 1 supplemental draft choice in 1992, as the Giants' new starting quarterback. Though Brown led the Giants to wins in their first three games of the season, the Giants lost their next 7 in a row to drop to 3–7. The poor play of Brown received much of the blame from fans and the media. However, the Giants recovered and won their last six games of the season, finishing with a 15–10 victory over the Dallas Cowboys at Giants Stadium. During this stretch they never allowed more than 20 points in a game, and the Giants ended the season with a record of 9–7. The team's stars included Rodney Hampton, who had his 4th straight 1,000 yard rushing season; second-year defensive lineman Michael Strahan, and linebackers Jessie Armstead and Michael Brooks.

In 1995 the team regressed further, losing even more players to free agency and finished the season with a 5–11 record, their worst since Bill Parcells' first season in 1983. Quarterback Dave Brown was particularly disappointing, as he finished with just 2,814 yards and 11 touchdowns on the season. Reeves went public with his desire to have more of a say in personnel matters. He controlled the team's free agency decisions, but feuded with General manager (GM) George Young who chose the team's draft picks. Lowlights were a 35–0 loss to the Dallas Cowboys in the Monday Night season opener, and the fans pelting the Charger sideline with snowballs in the season's final game. Though the defense still played well at times, the Giants sent no players to the Pro Bowl for the second straight year.

The Giants suffered through yet another poor season in 1996, finishing 6–10. Though Brown again started every game for the Giants he turned in one of the worst seasons of any starting quarterback in the league that year, throwing for 12 touchdowns against 20 interceptions. The Giants offense was one of the worst in the NFL and, unlike in previous years, the defense was unable to keep the offense afloat. After having one playoff appearance in four years, Reeves was dismissed after the 1996 season.

== Jim Fassel era ==
=== 1997–1999 ===
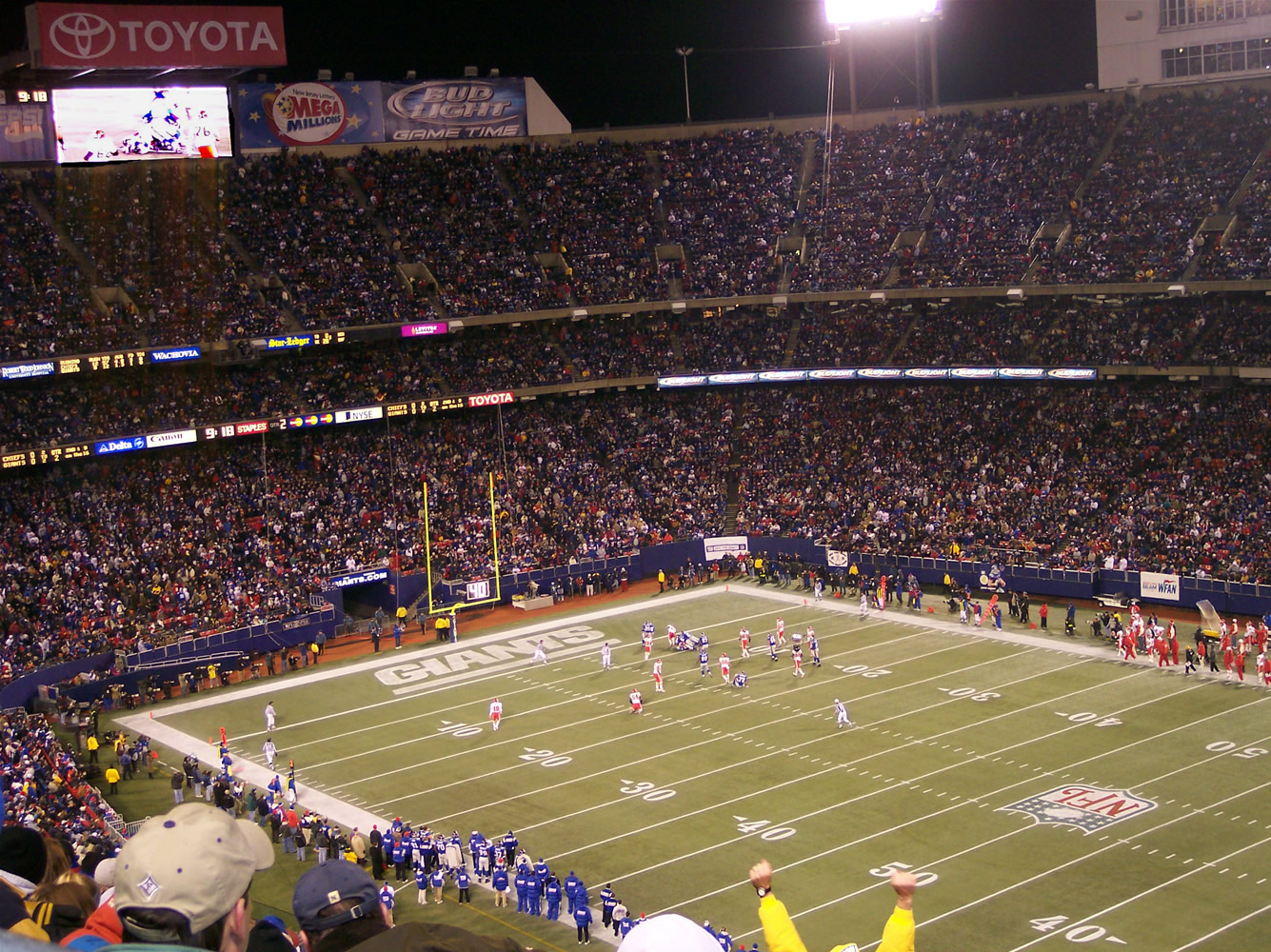
Giants Stadium was home to the Giants from 1976 to 2009.

The Giants hired Jim Fassel to replace Reeves before the 1997 season. Fassel had been the offensive coordinator for the Arizona Cardinals and Denver Broncos. After an opening day win against Philadelphia the Giants lost their next three games, including close losses to the Baltimore Ravens and St. Louis Rams. The Giants then won their next five games in a row. One of Fassel's biggest decisions during this streak was to replace Brown with second year quarterback Danny Kanell. The Giants won their next five game in a row to finish the season at 10–5–1, and win the NFC Eastern Division for the first time since 1990. In the first round, the Giants struggled in the fourth quarter, and the Vikings kicked a late field goal to defeat them, 23–22. After the 1997 season, Young, who as GM had helped build New York into a championship club in the 1980s, left the team to take a job in the NFL front office. He was replaced by Ernie Accorsi, a well-respected, veteran General Manager who had successful stints building the Baltimore Colts and Cleveland Browns.

In 1998, the Giants were unable to build on their successful 1997 season, and needed a four-game winning streak to close out the season at 8–8. The Giants strength was their defense, which featured two Pro Bowlers in Armstead and Strahan. However, the offense continued to be a disappointment. Brown had been jettisoned and replaced by Kanell and Kent Graham. Neither quarterback provided Pro Bowl caliber play, although Graham led the Giants to a 5–1 finish (including an upset of the then-undefeated Denver Broncos in Week 15).

Before the 1999 season the Giants signed quarterback Kerry Collins. Collins had been the first-ever draft choice of the expansion Carolina Panthers and in his second season led the Panthers to the NFC Championship game. However, problems with alcohol, conflicts with his teammates and questions about his character led to his release from the Panthers. Mike Ditka, coach of the New Orleans Saints signed him after his release; however the experiment failed and Collins was released again. Although many people, including Sports Illustrated football beat writer Peter King questioned the wisdom of Accorsi and the Giants giving Collins a US$16.9 million contract, especially when there was little interest for Collins's services league-wide, Accorsi was confident that Collins was a wise investment.

The 1999 season featured many strong individual performances by the Giants, especially on offense. Receiver Amani Toomer had a breakout season, accumulating over 1,100 yards receiving and six touchdowns. Fellow receiver Ike Hilliard also had a solid season, finishing just shy of 1,000 yards receiving on the year. Tight end Pete Mitchell contributed 58 receptions, and Tiki Barber emerged as a premiere pass-catching running back, catching 66 passes on the year. The defense was also solid, ranking 11th in the league and sending Armstead and Strahan to the Pro Bowl again. Though the Giants stood at 7–6 after 13 games, they lost their final three games of the season to miss the playoffs for the second consecutive season.

=== 2000: Super Bowl season ===
The 2000 season was considered a make-or-break season for Fassel. Like his predecessor, Dan Reeves, Fassel had enjoyed great success in his first year, but disappointment in the following two seasons. The conventional wisdom was that the Giants needed to have a strong year for Fassel to retain his job. The Giants' big draft acquisition was running back Ron Dayne, Heisman Trophy winner from the University of Wisconsin–Madison. Before the draft the team was debating whether to select Dayne or Shaun Alexander. The plan for Dayne was that the power running style he had at Wisconsin would complement Barber's speed and pass-catching ability. The two were dubbed "Thunder and Lightning".

After back-to-back November losses at home against St. Louis and Detroit dropped them to 7–4, the Giants playoff prospects were in question. In what would be his defining moment as Giants head coach, at a press conference following the Giants' loss to Detroit, Fassel guaranteed that "This team is going to the playoffs." The Giants responded, winning the next week's game against Arizona and the rest of their regular season games to finish the season 12–4 and earn a bye as the NFC's top seed.

The Giants won their first playoff game against the Philadelphia Eagles, 20–10. In the NFC Championship game faced the Minnesota Vikings, who were appearing in their second NFC Championship game in 3 seasons. Many people predicted that the Vikings and their high powered offense, led by Daunte Culpepper and receivers Randy Moss and Cris Carter would defeat the Giants and go on to the Super Bowl. However, the Giants dominated, winning, 41–0. The win marked the second time the Giants had won a Conference Championship in their home stadium by shutout. After the game Giants co-owner Wellington Mara delivered his famous "worst team ever" speech:

This team was referred to as the worst team ever to win the home-field advantage in the National Football League. And today, on our field of painted mud, we proved we're the worst team ever to win the NFC championship. In two weeks, we're going to try to become the worst team ever to win the Super Bowl.

Though the Giants kept the game close in the first half, and went into halftime down 10–0, the Ravens dominated the second half. Their defense (led by game MVP Ray Lewis) frustrated Kerry Collins all game long, resulting in Collins turning in one of the worst playoff performances in Super Bowl history. Collins completed 15 of 39 passes for 112 yards and 4 interceptions. The Ravens won the game 34–7 in one of the most lopsided Super Bowls ever. The lone Giants score came on a Ron Dixon kickoff return for a touchdown. On the very next kickoff, the Ravens countered as Jermaine Lewis also returned a kickoff for a touchdown.

On Sirius Radio, hosting a program in the mid-2010's, Amani Toomer revealed that Jim Fassel panicked in the week leading up to the Super Bowl. Changing the offensive game plan completely, the Giants lost the confidence built up in the NFC Championship game. Toomer attributes this as a major factor in their Super Bowl defeat.

=== 2001–2003 ===
The Giants were unable to build on their Super Bowl success in 2001, finishing the season 7–9 and out of the playoffs for the third time in four seasons. Kerry Collins continued to have success as the Giants' starting quarterback, throwing for over 3,700 yards and 19 TD's. Tiki Barber finished as the Giants leading rusher again, while tying Amani Toomer for the team lead with 72 receptions. But the standout player of the Giants 2001 season was Michael Strahan. Strahan set an NFL record by recording 22.5 sacks during the season, and won the NFL Defensive Player of the Year Award. He broke the 17-year-old NFL record held by Mark Gastineau.

The 2002 season saw the arrival of tight end Jeremy Shockey from the University of Miami, who provided Kerry Collins with yet another target. Collins would enjoy one of his best seasons as a pro in 2002, throwing for over 4,000 yards. Tiki Barber had his best season to date, rushing for 1386 yards and also catching 69 passes for 597 yards. The Giants started the season at 6–6, after which Fassel removed playcalling duties from offensive coordinator Sean Payton. The team responded to win their final four games to finish the year 10–6, and secure a first-round playoff game against the NFC West champion San Francisco 49ers.

The Giants controlled the 49ers throughout the game, and with four minutes left in the third quarter held a 38–14 lead, which would have been even larger had not Shockey dropped a touchdown pass in the third quarter. The 49ers rallied however, scoring a field goal and three touchdowns—two on Jeff Garcia touchdown passes, one on a Garcia 14-yard touchdown run, and two two-point conversions made by Terrell Owens—which gave the 49ers a 39–38 lead with a minute to go. Collins then drove the Giants down to the 49ers 23-yard line with six seconds to play, setting up a 41-yard potential game-winning field goal attempt by Matt Bryant. However, Bryant never got an opportunity to make the kick. 40-year-old long snapper Trey Junkin—who had been signed out of retirement for this playoff game—snapped the ball low and punter Matt Allen could not spot the ball for the attempt. With no other options, Allen threw it downfield to offensive lineman Rich Seubert. The Giants were penalized for an illegal man downfield (Seubert, despite checking in as an eligible receiver before the play), and the game was over. However, after the game, the NFL recognized that San Francisco should have been penalized on that play as well for pass interference. This would have created offsetting penalties and given New York a chance to kick again. After the game a devastated Junkin said "I cost 58 guys a chance to go to the Super Bowl. I'd give anything in the world, except my family at this point, right now to still be retired."

The loss was Fassel's second devastating playoff loss in three postseason appearances; following the season, Payton was not retained as offensive coordinator. The Giants started out the 2003 season 4–4, but lost their final eight games to finish 4–12. This included seven consecutive losses in the second half of the season, in which the Giants failed to score more than 13 points. With two games remaining in the season, Fassel requested a meeting with team management, and asked, if he was to be fired, that they do so now rather than wait until the end of the season. Management complied with his request, and fired Fassel on (or around) Dec. 17, 2003. However, in an unusual turn of events, the Giants agreed to allow him coach the team for the remainder of the season so long as Fassel assured them that the team would not "quit" on him.

== Tom Coughlin era: 2004–2015 ==
=== 2004 NFL draft and arrival of Eli Manning ===
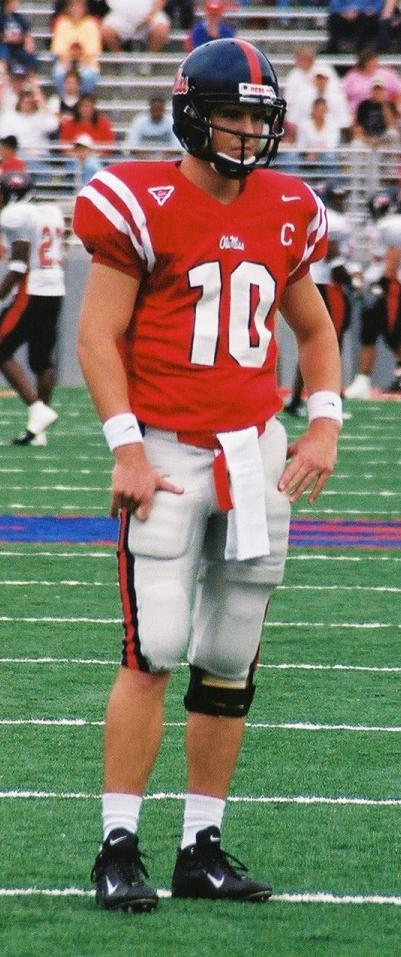
Coming out of Ole Miss in 2004 Eli Manning was the prized draft pick in that year's draft.

After a brief search, Ernie Accorsi hired Tom Coughlin, a one-time assistant of former Giants' coach Bill Parcells, to be the Giants new head coach. Coughlin had been the inaugural head coach of the Jacksonville Jaguars, and led them to the AFC Championship Game twice. He became the 16th head coach in franchise history. His stark, disciplinarian methods contrasted with the lax style employed by the departed Fassel. The Giants decided that their primary need was a franchise quarterback. Accorsi—who had coveted John Elway when he was Colts general manager in 1983—saw University of Mississippi quarterback Eli Manning as a similar talent. Manning's brother Peyton, and his father Archie, had already established successful careers as NFL quarterbacks. Though Accorsi wanted Manning, and Manning wanted to play in New York, Accorsi was unable to reach a deal to trade up to acquire him with the San Diego Chargers, who then used the first pick on Manning.

Manning had indicated before the draft that he did not want to play for the Chargers, and appeared unhappy when selected by them. After the pick was made, Chargers general manager A. J. Smith called Accorsi to make a deal. Part of the deal was that the Giants would select quarterback Philip Rivers out of North Carolina State University with the fourth pick overall and trade that pick, plus other selections (including the Giants first round pick the following year), to the Chargers for Manning's rights and additional considerations. When the trade was announced, the crowd in attendance at the draft (which was held in New York) cheered.

When Kerry Collins made it known that he did not want to stay with the Giants until they eventually demoted him for Manning, the Giants released Collins. They later signed quarterback Kurt Warner, to serve as the interim quarterback until Manning was deemed ready to play. Warner had led the St. Louis Rams to two Super Bowls, winning one of them. However, Warner had been affected by injuries, specifically a broken hand, which reduced his effectiveness and led to his release by the Rams.

=== 2004–2006: Eli Manning era begins ===
After losing the 2004 season opener, the Giants, behind Warner, went on to win five of their next six games to stand at 5–2. The Giants then lost two close games, to the Bears and Cardinals, to drop to 5–4. It was at this point that Coughlin announced that Eli Manning would become the starter for the rest of the season. Manning struggled in his first four starts, and the Giants did not score more than 14 points in any game. However, they played better in narrow losses to the Pittsburgh Steelers and the Cincinnati Bengals. The Giants won their final game of the year against rival Dallas, to finish the season 6–10. Top performers on the season included Tiki Barber, who established a personal career high in rushing yardage with 1,518 yards, and also contributed 52 catches and 15 touchdowns. Following the season Ron Dayne was released. Dayne had experienced several mediocre seasons while Shaun Alexander, who the Giants bypassed to draft Dayne, had developed into a consistent Pro Bowler.

The Giants won their first two games of the 2005 season, 42–19, against the Arizona Cardinals and 27–10, against the New Orleans Saints. The Giants lost to the Chargers the following week, 45–23, in a game which was marked by Chargers fans booing and jeering Eli Manning. They rebounded the following week, beating the St. Louis Rams by a score of 44–24.

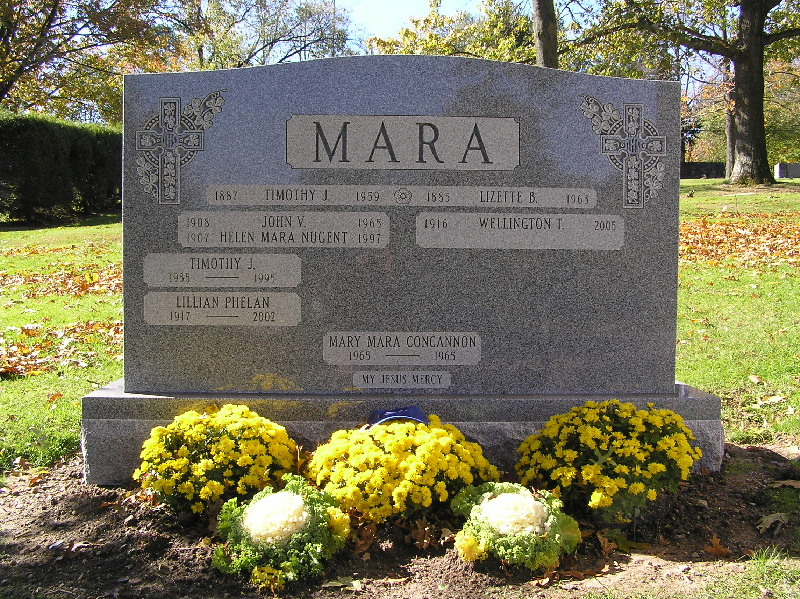
Wellington Mara's gravesite

On October 25, 2005, Giants patriarch Wellington Mara died at the age of 89. Mara had been involved with the Giants since he was 9 years old, when he was a ball boy for the Giants. The Giants dedicated their next game to Mara, and shut out the Washington Redskins, 36–0. Just twenty days after Mara's death, on November 15, 2005, the other Giants executive officer and well-known businessman Preston Robert Tisch died at the age of 79. The Giants then lost, 24–21, to the Seahawks when kicker Josh Brown kicked a 36-yard game-winning field goal. They then defeated the Cowboys, 17–10. The Giants defense made opposing quarterback Drew Bledsoe go 15 of 39 for 146 yards with only one touchdown pass and two interceptions. On December 17, 2005, in their 27–17 home victory against the Kansas City Chiefs, Tiki Barber set the team's single game rushing yard record with 220 yards, breaking the previous record of 218 yards, which had been set by Gene Roberts on November 12, 1950.

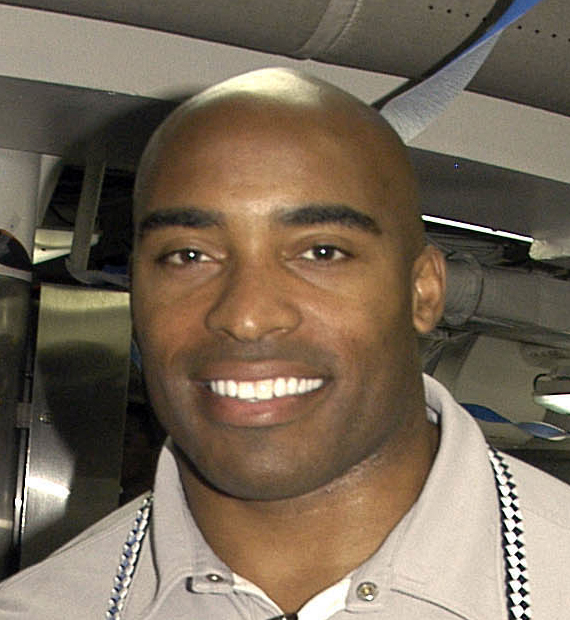
Tiki Barber set Giants single season and single game rushing records in 2005.

The Giants won the NFC East for the first time since 2000 with a 30–21 win against the Oakland Raiders in the final game of the season. The Giants lost 23–0 to the Carolina Panthers in the first round of the playoffs however. The 2005 Giants had five pro bowlers, including Barber (who set a team record in rushing yards during the season), Shockey, Strahan, Defensive End Osi Umenyiora, and Special teamer David Tyree.

In late September it was also announced that the New York Giants, New York Jets and the New Jersey Sports and Exhibition Authority had reached an agreement where both teams will work together to build a new stadium adjacent to the current Giants Stadium.

The Giants regressed to an 8–8 season in 2006. The season featured inconsistent play, criticism of the coaching by the media and players, and inconsistent play from Manning. The Giants won five consecutive games following a 1–2 start to gain a two-game advantage in the NFC East, but then key injuries to the offense and defense took their toll. Frustrations with the lack of production and with head coach Tom Coughlin began to surface as the Giants lost six of eight in the second half the season. The most disappointing loss of the season was a 24–21 defeat to the Titans, in which the team surrendered a 21-point fourth-quarter advantage. Following a season-ending win in Washington, the Giants claimed a wildcard berth in the NFC playoffs, but were defeated in the first round by the Eagles.

In his final season before retirement, Tiki Barber led the Giants with 1,662 yards and over 2,000 yards from scrimmage, Eli Manning threw for 3,244 yards and 24 touchdowns and Jeremy Shockey led the team in receptions. Defensively the team struggled all season long with pass defense (28th in the league) and with gaining a consistent pass rush.

=== 2007: Super Bowl champions ===
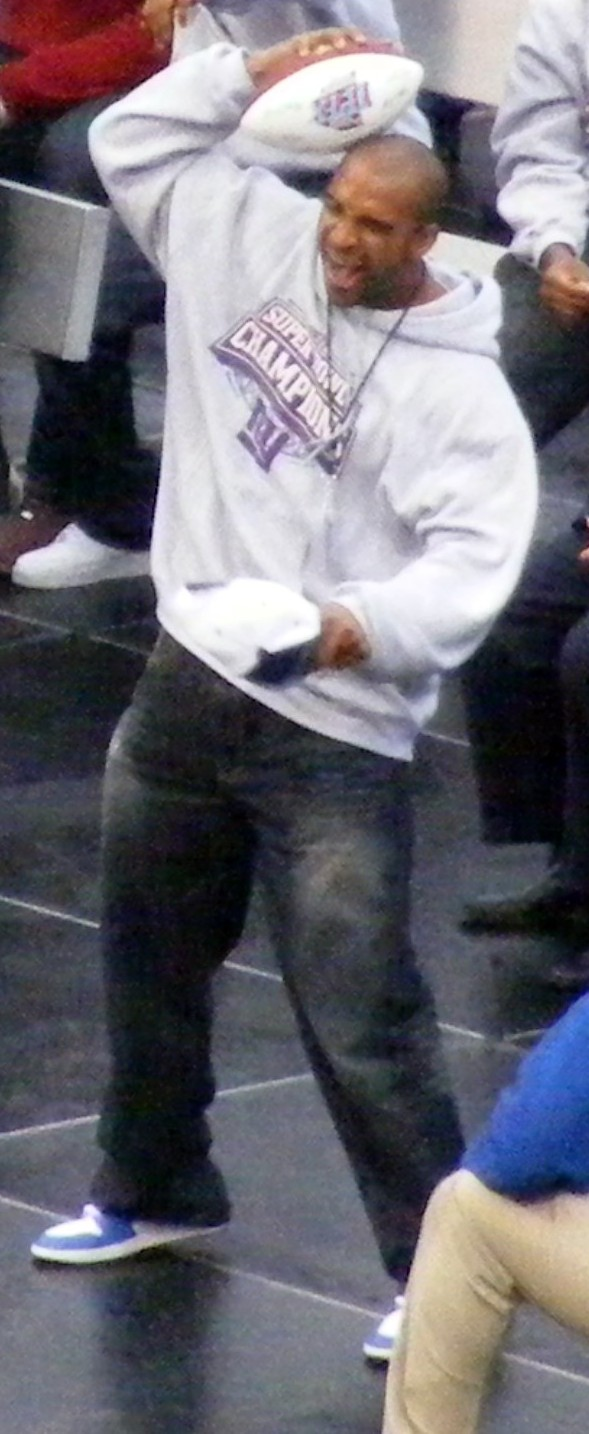
David Tyree playfully re-enacts his famous catch for the cameras at the Giants' championship rally.

In 2007, the Giants started 0–2 before winning their next six, making them only the second team in NFL history to accomplish that feat (the 1993 Dallas Cowboys were the other), and made the playoffs for the third consecutive season. In a game against the Eagles on September 30, the Giants tied the record for most sacks as a team in an NFL game, after sacking Philadelphia Eagles quarterback Donovan McNabb 12 times, with 6 of these coming from Osi Umenyiora. The Giants became the third NFL franchise to win at least 600 games when they defeated the Atlanta Falcons in an October Monday Night Football game 31–10. The Giants defeated the Miami Dolphins 13–10 in week eight in London's Wembley Stadium; the game was the first NFL regular-season game to be played outside of North America. The Giants made the playoffs with a 10–6 record (second in the NFC East) and played the Tampa Bay Buccaneers in the NFC Wild Card Playoffs. They avenged a third playoff loss from Buccaneers quarterback Jeff Garcia by beating them 24–14. Eli Manning earned his first playoff victory and Tom Coughlin picked up his first playoff victory as coach of the Giants. The next week the Giants defeated their division rival and NFC top seed Dallas Cowboys, winning their ninth consecutive road game. In the NFC Championship, kicker Lawrence Tynes made a final field goal for a 23–20 overtime win over the Packers in Green Bay. This made the Giants 4–0 in NFC Championship Games, and they advanced to Super Bowl XLII.

In Super Bowl XLII on February 3, 2008, the New York Giants defeated the New England Patriots, 17–14. The biggest play of the game was on third down on the Giants 44-yard line with 1:15 remaining. They were down, 14–10. After the snap, Manning ran back and was surrounded by a cloud of defenders. Escaping three near sacks, he made a miraculous pass to David Tyree, who caught the ball against his own helmet, while being covered by veteran defender Rodney Harrison. This set up the Giants' final touchdown to win. Eli Manning was named MVP, completing 19 of 34 passes for 255 yards along with two touchdowns. The Giants pulled off one of the biggest upsets in Super Bowl history by handing the New England Patriots their first loss of the season and preventing them from becoming only the second team in the Super Bowl era to finish undefeated. Plaxico Burress hauled in the game-winning touchdown pass with 35 seconds left to play to give the Giants their third Super Bowl. This game was also a rematch of their final regular season game, in which the Patriots came back from a 12-point deficit to finish the regular season 16–0.

A parade was held in the Canyon of Heroes of Lower Manhattan two days after the win, followed by a victory rally across the Hudson River inside Giants Stadium in East Rutherford, New Jersey.

=== 2008–2010: Closing of Giants Stadium and opening of MetLife Stadium ===
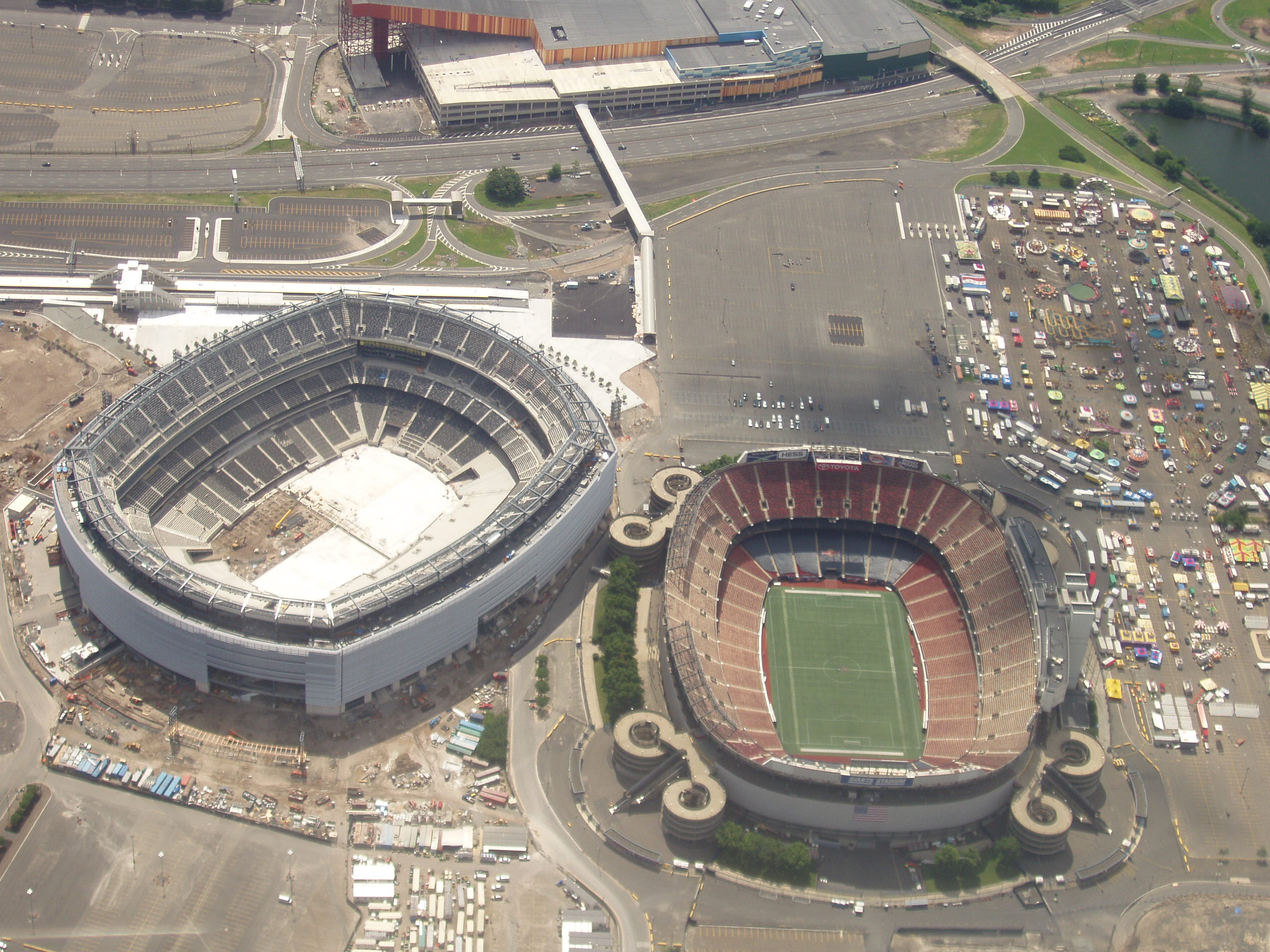
An aerial shot showing the construction of the Giants new stadium (on the left) alongside their old home field in July 2009

The Giants won their division again in 2008, with a record of 12–4 and earned themselves a first round bye and the No. 1 seed in the NFC. The Giants won 11 out for their first 12 games before stumbling to lose four of their final five including a 23–11 loss to the Eagles in the NFC Divisional Round. Manning was named to the Pro Bowl after the season, in a year where he threw for 3,238 yards, 21 touchdowns, and 10 interceptions. Other standouts included Brandon Jacobs and Derrick Ward who both rushed for 1,000 yards, as the Giants led the NFL in rushing yards. Justin Tuck led the team with 12 sacks, while Antonio Pierce was the team's leading tackler. The Giants featured a balanced offense with no receiver topping 600 receiving yards; the team also set a then-NFL record for fewest turnovers committed in the regular season with 13. The year marked a changing of the guard on the defensive line as Giants careers sack leader Michael Strahan retired before the season.

The 2009 season began with the Giants winning their first five games, but then dropped the next four. After beating the Falcons in overtime, they were routed by the Broncos on Thanksgiving. The Week 13 game with the Cowboys brought a 31–24 victory, but was followed by a 45–38 loss to the Eagles. The Giants nonetheless remained in the playoff picture until being defeated by the Panthers 41–9 in Week 16, in the last Giants home game at Giants Stadium. They then ended the year with an 8–8 record after a loss to the Vikings in Minnesota, missing the playoffs for the first time since 2004.

In the spring of 2010, the new Meadowlands Stadium was completed and the Giants and Jets opened it in August with their annual preseason match. During the summer, Bob Sheppard, the Giants' public address announcer from 1956 to 2005, died on July 11. The 2010 season would be dedicated to Sheppard's memory.

In the regular season, the Giants inaugurated their new home by beating the Panthers 31–18. Peyton outplayed Eli in the second "Manning Bowl" and the Colts won 38–14 in week two. Discipline became a growing problem during the early portion of the season. In the Colts' game, Jacobs threw his helmet into the stands, and in the next week's game with the Titans (a 29–10 loss at home) the Giants committed five personal fouls. The Giants next hosted the Bears on Sunday Night and won 17–3. After a win at Houston, the Giants then won their next three games to improve to 6–2. Their Week 14 game with Minnesota was scheduled for Sunday, December 12, but the Vikings' stadium roof collapsed, and the game was moved to Detroit and rescheduled to the next day, where the Giants won 21–3. Against the Eagles in the next week, the Giants blew a 21-point fourth quarter lead and the game when Eagles receiver DeSean Jackson returned it for a 65-yard game touchdown on the game's final play, in a match later dubbed the "Miracle at the New Meadowlands." The Giants finished the season 10–6, but missed the playoffs, the first time since 1988 that the franchise had won ten games in a season without making the playoffs. This was the sixth consecutive season the Giants finished with at least a .500 regular season record (2005–2010), the team's longest stretch since the NFL-AFL merger.

=== 2011: Super Bowl champions again ===
As the Giants began 2011, many NFL analysts predicted that the Eagles were a favorite to win the NFC East title, while the Giants were not expected to make the playoffs. The Giants opened their regular season against the Redskins on September 11, 2011, and lost in Washington 28–14. The Giants then won three straight games, including breaking their six-game losing streak to the Eagles. By Week 9, the Giants were 6–2 after beating the Patriots in New England for their first encounter since Super Bowl XLII. At this point however, they entered a difficult stretch of games and lost four straight to a resurgent 49ers, followed by the Eagles, Saints, and Packers. By now, the Giants found their chances of beating the Cowboys to the division title fading and Tom Coughlin's coaching abilities were increasingly called into question despite reassurances from team president John Mara that there were no plans to fire him. However, the Giants kept their playoff hopes alive in Week 14 by beating the Cowboys in Dallas on a last-second scoring drive led by Eli Manning and extending their win streak in Cowboys Stadium to three straight games. Despite another loss to the Redskins afterwards, the Giants defeated the New York Jets in Week 16 by a final score of 29–14, also eliminating the Eagles from playoff contention, to set up a rematch with the Cowboys in which the winner would win the NFC East and the loser would be eliminated from playoff contention. The game was later flexed into Sunday Night Football. The Giants beat the Cowboys 31–14 to win the NFC East with a record of 9–7. Throughout the regular season, Eli Manning (always viewed as a weak quarterback compared to his brother) put up some of the best stats of his career.

During the wild card round of the playoffs, the Giants hosted the Atlanta Falcons and won 24–2, with the Falcons' only score from a safety due to Eli Manning being flagged for grounding in the end zone. In the divisional round, the Giants were forced to play the defending champion Green Bay Packers at Lambeau Field. The Packers had finished the regular season with a league-best 15–1 record, including a 38–35 win against the Giants in Week 13. In addition, the Packers received a first-round bye, and thus this was their first playoff match. Despite these obstacles, the Giants handily defeated the Packers 37–20 to qualify for the NFC Championship Game against the San Francisco 49ers. With the score tied, 17–17, in regulation, the Giants moved into field goal range in overtime and Lawrence Tynes, the hero of the 2007 postseason, kicked a 20-yard field goal to send them to Super Bowl XLVI, a rematch against the New England Patriots.

==== Super Bowl XLVI ====
Once again facing the New England Patriots, the New York Giants headed to Lucas Oil Stadium, home of Eli's brother Peyton's team, the Indianapolis Colts. The Giants got off to an early lead by an intentional grounding call on Tom Brady in the end zone for a safety and retaining the ball for most of the 1st quarter. However, the Patriots came back and battled to a 10–9 lead. Nearing the end of the 4th quarter with the Giants behind 17–15, Patriots coach Bill Belichick allowed them to score a touchdown with the idea that they would have nearly a minute to drive downfield and score. However, the Giants defense held and broke up several Brady pass attempts. A last-second throw into the end zone by Brady was thwarted and the Giants won their fourth Super Bowl 21–17.

=== 2012–2015: Struggles ===
Like 2011, the Giants began the 2012 season 6–2 and finished 9–7, matching their 2011 record. After splitting their first four games, they won four straight, including a 26–3 road win against the eventual NFC Champion San Francisco 49ers. However, a 3–5 stretch in the second half of the season, punctuated by a 17–16 loss to the Washington Redskins and a 33–14 loss to the eventual Super Bowl XLVII champion Baltimore Ravens, was not enough for the Giants to overcome, causing them to miss the playoffs, thus failing to repeat as Super Bowl champions.

The Giants entered the 2013 season with hope they would play in Super Bowl XLVIII in their home stadium. However, the season began disastrously as the Giants lost their first six games of the season. Despite this, the Giants won their next four games, before losing to the Dallas Cowboys, 24–21. The Giants finished 7–9, their first losing season since 2004.

The Giants started the 2014 season losing their first two games before winning three straight. However, a seven-game losing streak sealed their fate, as they regressed to a 6–10 record. Despite the disappointing season, rookie wide receiver Odell Beckham Jr. won the NFL Offensive Rookie of the Year Award.

The Giants began the 2015 season in similar fashion. Their first two losses made them the first team in NFL history to lose their first two games despite leading by at least ten points. Despite their defensive struggles, they remained in the playoff race due to a weak division. But a poor November and December (in which the defense blew several late leads) caused the Giants to finish at 6–10.

== Ben McAdoo era: 2016–2017 ==
After several disappointing seasons, Coughlin retired after the end of the 2015 season as head coach. Ben McAdoo was named his successor. McAdoo brought the Giants to an 11–5 record and their first playoff berth since 2011 with a much improved defense (despite a mediocre offense). He was the first Giants head coach since Jim Fassel in 1997 to bring them to the playoffs in his first year as head coach. On December 11, 2016, during a Sunday Night Football game against the Dallas Cowboys, McAdoo was fined $200,000 for illegally using a walkie talkie on the field. Despite the regular season success, the Giants were defeated in the wild card round by the Green Bay Packers. In the week leading up to the game, several Giants wide receivers were seen on vacation in Miami with rapper Trey Songz, which some sources say largely contributed to the loss.

Despite an offseason filled with optimism, the 2017 season would prove much more challenging. An inept offense and under-performing defense, paired with season ending injuries to star wide receiver Odell Beckham Jr. and offseason acquisition Brandon Marshall, resulted in a 1–5 start. On November 5, 2017, the Giants suffered their largest home loss since 1998 in a 51–17 loss to the Los Angeles Rams. Disciplinary issues followed as mid-season suspensions were handed out to defensive stars Janoris Jenkins and Dominique Rogers-Cromartie. There was also speculation cornerback Eli Apple, the 10th overall pick in the 2016 NFL Draft, contemplated leaving the team after an especially critical film session led by McAdoo. The turbulent 2017 season came to a head for McAdoo when on November 28 he announced the team would be benching Eli Manning in favor of the much maligned Geno Smith. Manning's benching snapped his streak of 210 consecutive starts, the longest active streak in the NFL at the time, and the second longest in NFL history to only Brett Favre's 297. Fan and media reaction to the announcement was decidedly negative, with several fans and media personnel coming to Manning's defense despite the team's struggles on offense. Geno Smith would go on to start for the team in their week 13 loss to the Oakland Raiders, bringing their record to 2–10. The following day, the Giants fired Ben McAdoo and general manager Jerry Reese. McAdoo was the first Giants head coach to be fired during a season since Bill Arnsparger in 1976, and also became the first head coach to not last two full seasons with the team since Earl Potteiger in 1928. Defensive coordinator Steve Spagnuolo was named interim head coach, and Eli Manning was reinstated as starting quarterback for the remainder of the season. The Giants would proceed to finish the season 1–3 for a final record of 3–13. The record was the worst that the Giants posted since the league expanded to a 16-game regular season in 1978. Before the final game of the season against the Washington Redskins, the Giants formally announced the hiring of Dave Gettleman as their next general manager.

== Pat Shurmur era: 2018–2019 ==
On January 22, 2018, the Giants announced the hiring of Pat Shurmur as their next head coach. Shurmur had previously been the offensive coordinator for the Minnesota Vikings, offensive coordinator and interim head coach for the Philadelphia Eagles, and head coach of the Cleveland Browns. The Giants selected running back Saquon Barkley out of Penn State with their first round draft pick in the 2018 NFL draft, the highest that the Giants had selected in the draft since 1981. The Giants aggressively turned over their roster from the 2017 season, with only 13 out of the 53 players from the previous season's final game making the initial roster for the 2018 season. Despite these changes, the Giants only marginally improved in their first season under Shurmur, finishing last in the NFC East for a second year in a row with a 5–11 record. In the 2019 NFL draft The Giants selected Eli Manning successor Daniel Jones. The 2019 season opened with their third straight 0–2 start and on September 17, 2019, the Giants announced they would bench Eli Manning to accommodate Daniel Jones. They did moderately well the next two games to even out at 2–2, but suffered a 9–game losing streak. The streak came to an end in Week 15 at home against the Miami Dolphins in what turned out to be Eli Manning's final home game as a Giant as he announced his retirement after the season. They would later finish at 4–12. On December 30, 2019, the Giants fired head coach Pat Shurmur.

== Joe Judge era: 2020–2021 ==
On January 8, 2020, the Giants hired Joe Judge as the teams next head coach. The Giants opened their season with a horrendous 0–5 start for the first time since 2017. They would later rebound to 1–7 and they won their next 4 games heading into week 13 where they suffered a 3-game losing streak. Despite losing to the Baltimore Ravens 27–13 in Week 16, due to a very weak NFC East division that season, the Giants remained mathematically alive for the division title heading into Week 17. They needed a win against the Dallas Cowboys and a loss by the Washington Football Team in order to win the division. Despite defeating the Cowboys 23–19 that knocked the struggling Cowboys out of the playoffs, Washington would go on to win the game against the Philadelphia Eagles and the Giants missed the playoffs for the fourth straight season. The Giants would have been the first team to clinch a playoff berth and a division title with a double-digit losing record in the history of the NFL.

2021 would be a disaster for the Giants as they started 0–3, with the last two games against the Washington Football Team and the Atlanta Falcons being lost due to game-winning kicks. They would later finish at 4–13 including a six-game losing streak to end their season. On January 10, 2022, general manager Dave Gettleman announced his retirement and the next day, January 11, 2022, the Giants announced that Judge was fired after a disastrous season. Judge's season suffered from questionable calls, such as a coach's challenge on a non-reviewable scoring play during Week 1 versus the Denver Broncos, a controversial 11 minute post-game locker room rant after a 29–3 loss to the Chicago Bears, and a quarterback sneak on 3rd and 9 against their own goalline during a Week 18 matchup against the Washington Football Team.

== Brian Daboll era: 2022–2025 ==
On January 21, 2022, the Giants hired Joe Schoen, the former assistant general manager for the Buffalo Bills, as their general manager. One week later, on January 28, 2022, the Giants hired Bills offensive coordinator Brian Daboll as the team's next head coach.

The Giants opened their 2022 season with a 2–0 record for the first time since 2016 and had their best start since 2008. The Giants surpassed their 2021 win total after a Week 6 win over the Baltimore Ravens. With a win over the Washington Commanders in Week 15, they recorded their first non-losing season since 2016, and their first season since 2009 in which they never had a losing record at any stage. Despite struggling in the second half of the season, the Giants clinched a playoff spot and a winning record for the first time since 2016 with a Week 17 38–10 victory over the Indianapolis Colts. They would later Giants would later finish at 9–7–1 to finish at 3rd place in the NFC East and the NFC's #6 Seed.

As the sixth seed in the NFC, the Giants beat the Minnesota Vikings 31–24 in the Wild Card round, getting their first playoff win since Super Bowl XLVI in 2012. However, the Giants' season would end the following week with a 38–7 loss to their arch-rival and eventual NFC champion Philadelphia Eagles in the Divisional Round.

The 2023 season would be less successful as they had failed to improve on their 9–7–1 record from the previous season. A historically poor offensive line and numerous injuries, particularly losing starting quarterback Daniel Jones to a torn ACL in a Week 9 loss to the Raiders, plagued the team throughout the year. One highlight featured the Giants trailing 20–0 at halftime against the Arizona Cardinals. The Giants would later make a comeback to win the game 31–28. They would later finish at 6–11.

The 2024 season got off to a poor start, with the team starting 0-2 after losses to the Vikings and Commanders. This was followed by wins in 2 of their next 3 games, beating the Cleveland Browns and Seattle Seahawks on the road sandwiched around a home loss to the division rival Dallas Cowboys. However, the success did not last long, as the Giants lost their next 10 games, setting a new franchise record for longest losing streak during a season. In the week 14 loss to the New Orleans Saints, fans were seen wearing paper bags over their heads. The losing streak finally ended in week 17 with a win over the Indianapolis Colts, which knocked the Colts out of playoff contention. This would result in the only home victory for the Giants, thus avoiding becoming the first team in NFL history to lose 9 games at home during a season. However, there would be no saving the Giants from setting a new franchise record for losses, as a loss the next week in Philadelphia gave them their 14th loss, setting a new franchise record for losses in one season. The Giants were also swept by the NFC East for the first time in franchise history.

The 2025 season was marred by several close losses on the road, many of which saw the Giants choke away big leads and lose in the final 2 minutes, despite the solid play of rookie quarterback Jaxson Dart. After a loss to the Bears which dropped the Giants to 2-8, Daboll was fired and replaced by offensive coordinator Mike Kafka. Defensive coordinator Shane Bowen was also fired after a loss to the Lions. The Giants ultimately finished the season with a 4-13 record.

== John Harbaugh era: 2026-present ==
The team hired former longtime Baltimore Ravens head coach John Harbaugh as the new head coach on January 17, 2026.

== See also ==
- New York Giants seasons
- Logos and Uniforms of the New York Giants
- List of New York Giants players
