= Sherrard (name) =

Sherrard is both a surname and a given name. Notable people with the name include:

== Surname ==
- Charles Sherrard (1849–1938), English rugby union player
- Cherrie Sherrard (born 1938), American hurdler
- Danny Sherrard, American poet
- Jackie Sherrard (born 1956), English football player
- Kalan Sherrard (born 1988), American street performer
- Kathleen Sherrard (1898–1975), Australian geologist and palaeontologist
- Mike Sherrard (born 1963), American football player
- Patrick Sherrard (1919–1997), English cricketer
- Philip Sherrard (1922–1995), British author and scholar of Modern Greek literature
- Ryan Sherrard (born 1986), Canadian-German curler
- Seán Patrick Michael Sherrard, Irish singer and composer better known as Johnny Logan
- Valerie Sherrard (born 1957), Canadian writer
- William Sherrard (1872–1895), Irish football player

== Given name ==
- Sherrard Clemens (1820–1881), American politician and lawyer

== See also ==
- Sherard (name)
