= Rodney Hampton =

American football player (born 1969)

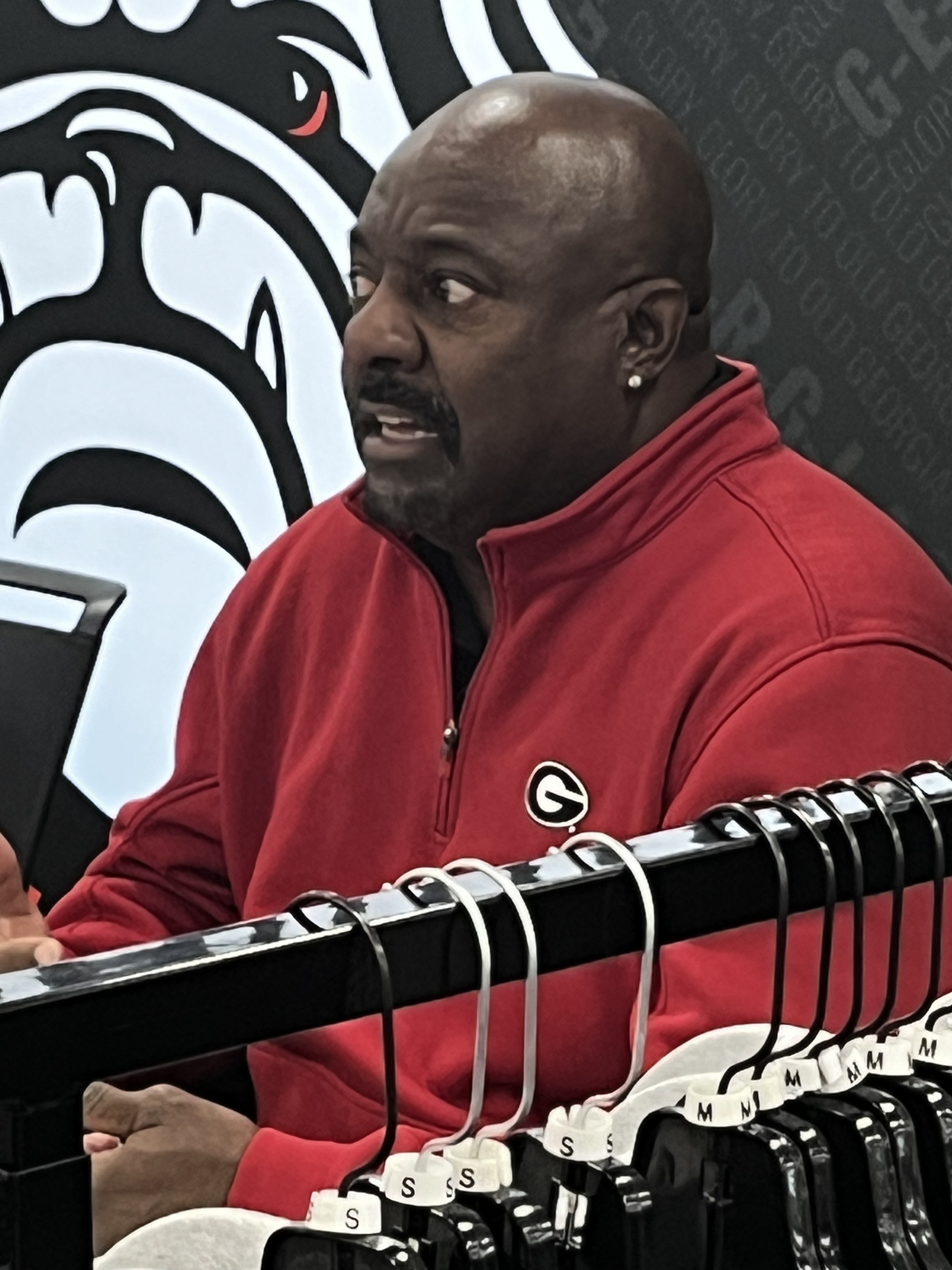
- Hampton in 2025

No. 27
- Position: Running back

Personal information
- Born: April 3, 1969 (age 57); Houston, Texas, U.S.
- Listed height: 5 ft 11 in (1.80 m)
- Listed weight: 228 lb (103 kg)

Career information
- High school: Kashmere (Houston)
- College: Georgia
- NFL draft: 1990: 1st round, 24th overall pick

Career history
- New York Giants (1990–1997)

Awards and highlights
- Super Bowl champion (XXV); 2× Pro Bowl (1992, 1993); New York Giants Ring of Honor; 45th greatest New York Giant of all-time; First-team All-SEC (1989); Florida–Georgia Hall of Fame

Career NFL statistics
- Rushing yards: 6,897
- Average: 3.8
- Touchdowns: 49
- Stats at Pro Football Reference

Rodney Craig Hampton (born April 3, 1969) is an American former professional football player who was a running back for the New York Giants of the National Football League (NFL). He played college football for the Georgia Bulldogs and was selected by the Giants in the first round of the 1990 NFL draft. He was a starting running back for the 1990 New York Giants who finished the year at 13–3 during the regular season while winning Super Bowl XXV on January 27, 1991.

== Biography ==
A 5'11", 215 lbs. running back from the University of Georgia by way of Kashmere High School in Houston, Texas, Rodney Hampton played his entire career with the Giants from 1990 to 1997. A two-time Pro Bowl selection in 1992 and 1993, his 6,897 career rushing yards stood as the most in Giants history until Tiki Barber surpassed that mark in the 2004 NFL season. Hampton was a member of the Giants team that won Super Bowl XXV.

After his rookie season was cut short due to injury, Hampton emerged as the team's most consistent offensive weapon over the next five seasons. He broke the 1,000 yard mark each year from 1991 to 1995. Following the 1995 season, Hampton was signed to a free agent offer sheet by the San Francisco 49ers, but the Giants quickly matched, and he remained in New York. Hampton rushed for over 800 yards in the 1996 season sharing carries with Tyrone Wheatley, but in 1997, Hampton underwent preseason arthroscopic surgery for a knee injury sustained in late in the 1996 season, and was only able to return to the team to see action in 2 late-season games, plus the Giants' lone playoff game. The Giants released Hampton prior to the 1998 season, and though he announced his intention to continue playing and a couple of teams reportedly enquired with his agent, having received no offers once the season began, Hampton opted to retire.

== Career statistics ==
Hampton's stats for the Georgia Bulldogs
| Season | Rushing | | | | | Receiving | | | | |
| Season | Att | Yds | Avg | Lng | TD | Rec | Yds | Avg | Lng | TD |
|---|---|---|---|---|---|---|---|---|---|---|
| 1987 | 126 | 890 | 7.1 | 50 | 4 | 10 | 133 | 13.3 | 36 | 2 |
| 1988 | 128 | 719 | 5.6 | 56 | 6 | 10 | 86 | 8.6 | 13 | 1 |
| 1989 | 218 | 1,059 | 4.9 | 36 | 12 | 26 | 219 | 8.4 | 29 | 0 |
| Totals | 472 | 2,668 | 5.7 | 50 | 22 | 46 | 438 | 9.5 | 36 | 3 |

Hampton's stats in the NFL
| Year | Team | GP | Rushing | | | | | Receiving | | | | |
| Year | Team | GP | Att | Yds | Avg | Lng | TD | Rec | Yds | Avg | Lng | TD |
|---|---|---|---|---|---|---|---|---|---|---|---|---|
| 1990 | NYG | 15 | 109 | 455 | 4.2 | 41 | 2 | 32 | 274 | 8.6 | 27 | 2 |
| 1991 | NYG | 14 | 256 | 1,059 | 4.1 | 44 | 10 | 43 | 283 | 6.6 | 19 | 0 |
| 1992 | NYG | 16 | 257 | 1,141 | 4.4 | 63 | 14 | 28 | 215 | 7.7 | 31 | 0 |
| 1993 | NYG | 12 | 292 | 1,077 | 3.7 | 20 | 5 | 18 | 210 | 11.7 | 62 | 0 |
| 1994 | NYG | 14 | 327 | 1,075 | 3.3 | 27 | 6 | 14 | 103 | 7.4 | 17 | 0 |
| 1995 | NYG | 16 | 306 | 1,182 | 3.9 | 32 | 10 | 24 | 142 | 5.9 | 18 | 0 |
| 1996 | NYG | 15 | 254 | 827 | 3.3 | 25 | 1 | 15 | 82 | 5.5 | 16 | 0 |
| 1997 | NYG | 2 | 23 | 81 | 3.5 | 22 | 1 | 0 | 0 | 0.0 | 0 | 0 |
| Totals | | 104 | 1,824 | 6,897 | 3.8 | 63 | 49 | 174 | 1,309 | 7.5 | 62 | 2 |

== See also ==
- History of the New York Giants (1979–1993)
- History of the New York Giants (1994–present)
