= Chris Calloway =

American football player (born 1968)

No. 88, 80, 82
- Position: Wide receiver

Personal information
- Born: March 29, 1968 (age 58); Chicago, Illinois, U.S.
- Listed height: 5 ft 10 in (1.78 m)
- Listed weight: 189 lb (86 kg)

Career information
- High school: Chicago (IL) Mount Carmel
- College: Michigan
- NFL draft: 1990: 4th round, 97th overall pick

Career history
- Pittsburgh Steelers (1990–1991); New York Giants (1992–1998); Atlanta Falcons (1999); New England Patriots (2000)

Career NFL statistics
- Receptions: 386
- Receiving yards: 5,497
- Touchdowns: 30
- Stats at Pro Football Reference

Christopher Fitzpatrick Calloway (born March 29, 1968) is an American former professional football player.

Calloway played as a wide receiver in the National Football League (NFL) for 11 seasons, including seven seasons for the New York Giants from 1992 to 1998. He was the Giants' leading receiver for four consecutive seasons from 1995 to 1998 and set a franchise record with a pass reception in 47 consecutive games from 1996 to 1998. At the end of his time with the Giants, his 334 catches ranked third in franchise history. He also played for the Pittsburgh Steelers from 1990 to 1991, the Atlanta Falcons in 1999 and the New England Patriots in 2000.

A native of Chicago, Calloway played college football as a flanker for the University of Michigan from 1987 to 1989. He caught 56 passes for 826 yards and eight touchdowns at Michigan. He played on two Big Ten Conference championship teams and appeared in two Rose Bowl Games for the Wolverines.

== Early life ==
Calloway was born in Chicago, Illinois, in 1968. He attended Mount Carmel High School in Chicago.

== University of Michigan ==
Calloway enrolled at the University of Michigan in 1986 and played college football as a flanker for head coach Bo Schembechler's Michigan Wolverines football teams from 1987 to 1989. He started five games at the flanker position in 1987, five games at flanker and one at split end in 1988, and 12 games at flanker in 1989. He won both the Meyer Morton Award and the Robert P. Ufer Award in 1989. In his three years as a receiver at Michigan, he caught 56 passes for 826 yards and eight touchdowns.

== Professional football ==
=== Pittsburgh Steelers ===
Calloway was selected by the Pittsburgh Steelers in the fourth round (97th overall pick) of the 1990 NFL draft. He was principally a backup receiver and special teams player for the Steelers. He appeared in 28 games, two as a starter, during the 1990 and 1991 seasons. He caught 25 passes for 378 yards and two touchdowns with the Steelers.

=== New York Giants ===
In March 1992, the New York Giants signed Calloway as a Plan B free agent. Calloway spent seven seasons with the Giants, appearing in 112 games, including 86 as a starter. He caught 334 passes for 4,710 yards (14.1 yards per catch) and 27 touchdowns. He had his best seasons in 1997 (58 catches for 849 yards and eight touchdowns) and 1998 (62 catches for 812 yards and six touchdowns). He was the Giants' leading receiver for four straight years from 1995 to 1998 and set a franchise record with a pass reception in 47 straight games from 1996 to 1998. In 1998, Calloway's last season with the Giants, he led the team with 62 receptions for 812 yards and 6 touchdowns. His 62 receptions were the most by a Giant receiver since Lionel Manuel in 1988. He was released by the Giants in February 1999, a move which he said had surprised him after leading the team in receptions for the previous four consecutive seasons. He was due just over $1 million and had a $300,000 bonus due on March 1. At the end of his seven seasons with the Giants, his 334 catches ranked third in franchise history behind Frank Gifford (367 catches) and Joe Morrison (395 catches).

=== Atlanta Falcons ===
In February 1999, following a visit with the Washington Redskins Calloway signed with the Atlanta Falcons, reuniting him with former Giants head coach Dan Reeves. Calloway's agent, Peter Schaffer, stated that Calloway's contract was for nearly $4 million. Calloway appeared in 11 games for the Falcons, six as a starter, and caught 22 passes for 314 yards and one touchdown. Calloway was released by the Falcons in May 2000

=== New England Patriots ===
In August 2000, Calloway signed with the New England Patriots, bringing him back together with former Giants assistant and new Patriots assistant coach, Dick Rehbein. He appeared in seven games, two as a starter, for the Patriots in 2000. He caught only five passes for 95 yards.

== NFL career statistics ==
| Year | Team | Games | | Receiving | | | | | Rushing | | | | | Fumbles | |
| Year | Team | GP | GS | Rec | Yds | Avg | Lng | TD | Att | Yds | Avg | Lng | TD | Fum | Lost |
|---|---|---|---|---|---|---|---|---|---|---|---|---|---|---|---|
| 1990 | PIT | 16 | 2 | 10 | 124 | 12.4 | 20T | 1 | 0 | 0 | 0.0 | 0 | 0 | 0 | 0 |
| 1991 | PIT | 12 | 0 | 15 | 254 | 16.9 | 33T | 1 | 0 | 0 | 0.0 | 0 | 0 | 0 | 0 |
| 1992 | NYG | 16 | 1 | 27 | 335 | 12.4 | 28 | 1 | 0 | 12 | 0.0 | 0 | 0 | 0 | 0 |
| 1993 | NYG | 16 | 9 | 35 | 513 | 14.7 | 47 | 3 | 0 | 0 | 0.0 | 6 | 0 | 0 | 0 |
| 1994 | NYG | 16 | 14 | 43 | 666 | 15.5 | 51T | 2 | 8 | 77 | 9.6 | 20 | 0 | 1 | 1 |
| 1995 | NYG | 16 | 15 | 56 | 796 | 14.2 | 49 | 3 | 2 | -9 | -4.5 | -3 | 0 | 0 | 0 |
| 1996 | NYG | 16 | 15 | 53 | 739 | 13.9 | 36 | 4 | 1 | 2 | 2.0 | 2 | 0 | 1 | 1 |
| 1997 | NYG | 16 | 16 | 58 | 849 | 14.6 | 68T | 8 | 1 | -1 | -1.0 | -1 | 0 | 0 | 0 |
| 1998 | NYG | 16 | 16 | 62 | 812 | 13.1 | 36 | 6 | 0 | 0 | 0.0 | 0 | 0 | 1 | 1 |
| 1999 | ATL | 11 | 6 | 22 | 314 | 14.3 | 33 | 1 | 0 | 0 | 0.0 | 0 | 0 | 0 | 0 |
| 2000 | NE | 7 | 2 | 5 | 95 | 19.0 | 28 | 0 | 0 | 0 | 0.0 | 0 | 0 | 0 | 0 |
| Career | | 158 | 96 | 386 | 5,497 | 14.2 | 68 | 30 | 12 | 69 | 5.8 | 20 | 0 | 3 | 3 |

== Later life ==
After retiring from football, Calloway bought a nightclub in Atlanta called "Fuel". He later became involved with an Atlanta businessman who Calloway claimed "nearly milked him dry in a treacherous Ponzi scheme." As of 2020, he lives in Houston and is married to Crystal L. Calloway.
