= Bennet Sherard =

Bennet Sherard may refer to:

- Bennet Sherard, 2nd Baron Sherard (1621–1700), Custos Rotulorum of Rutland, MP for Leicestershire
- Bennet Sherard (MP) (1649–1701), Member of Parliament for Rutland
- Bennet Sherard, 1st Earl of Harborough (1677–1732), British peer and Member of Parliament
- Bennet Sherard, 3rd Earl of Harborough (1709–1770), Earl of Harborough
