= Ron Blum =

American football official

Ron Blum is a former American football official in the National Football League (NFL), having served in that role from the 1985 NFL season through the 2007 NFL season. He joined the league as a line judge, officiating Super Bowl XXIV in 1990 and Super Bowl XXVI in 1992 and later became a referee for the start of the 1993 NFL season, replacing retired legend Pat Haggerty. Blum also was the Referee for the 1997 AFC Championship, which would be his highest game worked at the Referee position. Blum moved back to line judge beginning with the 2004 NFL season, and worked his last four seasons on the crew of referee Tony Corrente.

Blum wore the uniform number 83 from the 1985 to 1992 seasons and the number 7 from 1993 through 2007. He was the first non-referee to wear the uniform number 7; the number belonged to long-time referees Tommy Bell and, later, Fred Silva before Blum assumed it upon his promotion to crew chief. Side judge Keith Washington took the number upon Blum's retirement.

Blum played professional baseball for the Pittsburgh Pirates and the Chicago Cubs Organizations. He was All American in High School in basketball, football and baseball. Blum was a better quarterback than shortstop but his mom feared injury in football, so he opted for a baseball contract rather than pursuing his football dreams. He is a member of the Marin County Hall of Fame where he attended Marin Catholic High School.

In the offseason, Blum is a golf professional. He served as an assistant pro at Silverado Golf Course in Napa during the 1970s. For a number of years in the 1980s he was the head golf pro at the Sonoma National Golf Course in Sonoma County, California.

Blum was the referee for the San Diego Chargers' 27–17 victory over the New York Giants at Giants Stadium on December 23, 1995. The contest was notable because both teams, the game officials and other field-level personnel spent the entire second half dodging snowballs hurled by unruly fans. A few such projectiles hit Blum's legs. When he picked up a telephone on the Chargers' sidelines to make a call to request that a verbal warning to the crowd be made over the public address system, a snowball narrowly missed hitting him. Instead it struck Chargers equipment manager Sid Brooks, who was knocked unconscious and had to be removed from the sidelines on a stretcher. After retiring from officiating, Blum was asked to be an aid in television broadcast explaining calls, etc., he opted instead to join the San Francisco 49ers coaching staff, where he advised Coach Mike Singletary on when to challenge calls for two seasons. Now fully retired, Blum enjoys golfing daily at the course where he lives
