= Philip Sherard =

Philip Sherard may refer to:

- Philip Sherard (MP) (1623–1695), Member of Parliament for Rutland
- Philip Sherard, 2nd Earl of Harborough (1680–1750)
- Lt-Gen. Philip Sherard (d. 1790), Guards officer during the Seven Years' War
- Philip Sherard, 5th Earl of Harborough (1767–1807)
- Philip Sherard, 9th Baron Sherard (1804–1886)
- Philip Sherard, 11th Baron Sherard (1851–1924)

== See also ==
- Philip Sherrard, British author and philosopher
