= Derek Allen (American football) =

American football player (born 1971)

No. 69
- Position: Guard

Personal information
- Born: January 30, 1971 (age 55); Geneseo, Illinois, U.S.
- Listed height: 6 ft 4 in (1.93 m)
- Listed weight: 290 lb (132 kg)

Career information
- High school: Geneseo
- College: Illinois
- NFL draft: 1995: undrafted

Career history
- New York Giants (1995); Rhein Fire (1996)
- Stats at Pro Football Reference

Derek Scott Allen (born January 30, 1971) is an American former professional football player who was a guard for the New York Giants of the National Football League in 1995. He also played for the Rhein Fire of the World League of American Football (today NFL Europe) in 1996. He played college football for the Illinois Fighting Illini.
