= Sid Brooks =

American equipment manager (1935–2007)

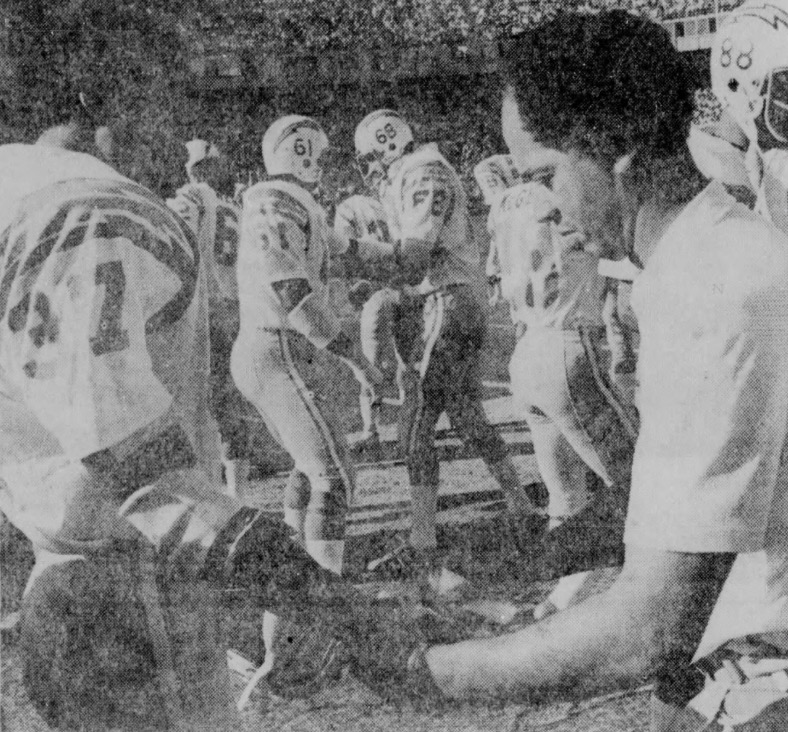
Brooks (right) with the San Diego Chargers in 1973, tending to Cid Edwards

Sidney Joseph Patrick Brooks (March 17, 1935 – April 14, 2007), nicknamed "Doc", was an American equipment manager for the San Diego Chargers (now Los Angeles) of the National Football League (NFL). He served in the U.S. Air Force for 20 years before spending 27 years with the Chargers (1973–2000). He was also the director of athletic equipment operations at the University of Southern California (USC) for five years (2000–2005).

== Early life ==
On March 17, 1935, Brooks was born in Ste. Genevieve, Missouri, to one of the city's first Black families. His father was born in Ste. Genevieve, and worked with banker Henry L. Rozier Sr. and his family for 77 years. Brooks's mother was the city's first African American resident with a college degree. She died from a head injury in a car wreck when he was six. He grew up with his older and younger brother, who were raised alone by their father. Few Blacks lived in Ste. Genevieve. Brooks was allowed to go to the local elementary school, but he took a bus over 50 miles (80 km) to go to a segregated high school in Festus, Missouri. He attended Douglass High School, where he was a member of their state championship relay team.

== Air Force ==
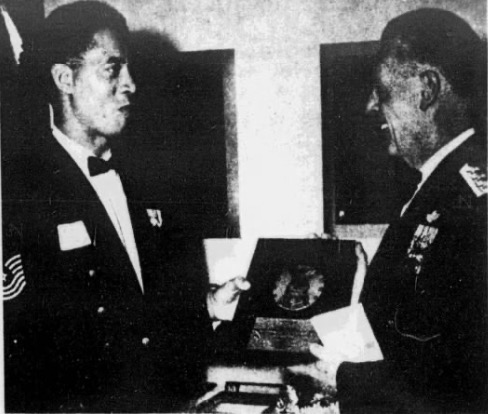
Brooks accepting award for Senior Non-Commissioned Officer of the Year for 1969

Brooks joined the Air Force when he was 18. He served 20 years, earning a promotion to senior master sergeant. He completed tours of duty in both the Korean War and Vietnam War, and was awarded 28 service medals. Brooks was named the U.S. Air Force Academy's Senior Non-Commissioned Officer of the Year in 1969, and he was one of the Air Force's Outstanding Airman of the Year in 1970, among 12 selected out of 650,000 airmen. He was Outstanding Airman of the Year for the Far East while at Da Nang Air Base in Vietnam in 1972. For five years from 1968 to 1973, he led the Air Force Academy's Cadet Athletic Supply Branch before retiring from the Air Force.

== San Diego Chargers ==
Brooks became the equipment manager for the San Diego Chargers in 1973. (Note: Some sources have called Brooks the first Black equipment manager in the NFL. However, The Louisiana Weekly wrote that Charlie Shepherd was the first with the New Orleans Saints in 1967.) Among his achievements with the team, he was credited with co-inventing colored face masks, colored football shoes, and three-color jersey numbers. The Chargers changed to yellow face masks after general manager and head coach Harland Svare made a request in 1973 for fiercer uniforms, like the darker blue jersey and blue helmet he wore with the New York Giants. At the time, every team had gray face masks. (Note: In a few rare cases, individual players had changed their face mask color, but it was not done across the team.) Brooks and Chargers business manager Bob Hood first went to their face mask supplier, Riddell, but they said they could not change the color. Brooks and Hood then approached a dentist who was selling face masks under the brand name Dungard, who was able to change the color by using a dental process. Some players were still wearing old single- and double-bar masks, which Brooks painted yellow himself. The Chargers introduced their new uniforms in 1974, after Svare had resigned as coach at the end of the 1973 season.

Standing at 6 feet 1 inch (1.85 m) and 200 pounds (91 kg), Brooks was athletic, and he annually raced a designated rookie in a 40-yard dash. He entered his final race in 1989 with an undefeated record of 16–0–1, tying Dennis McKnight in 1982. Brooks usually raced a lineman, but the 54-year-old agreed to go against quarterback Billy Joe Tolliver that year. The fleshy Tolliver started slow but recovered to win. According to Brooks, the two players holding the tape, Billy Ray Smith and Gary Plummer, kept moving the finish line. "Billy Joe might not have been as fast as I was, but he'd last longer", Brooks wrote.

In a Chargers road game against the New York Giants in 1995, fans at Giants Stadium threw snowballs throughout the game at players and coaches of both teams, as well as photographers, reporters, and security personnel. In the fourth quarter, Brooks was hit near his left eye by an ice ball. He collapsed and was unconscious for 30 seconds before being placed on a stretcher. "After all those years in Korea and Vietnam, I didn't get hurt until I came back here to New York. I'm sorry, I mean New Jersey", said Brooks. He called it "a cowardly act". He was not angry or bitter. NFL commissioner Paul Tagliabue wrote him a letter for his "professionalism and class" in downplaying the incident.

After 27 years with the Chargers, Brooks retired from the team in April 2000.

== USC ==
In July 2000, shortly after leaving the Chargers, Brooks accepted an offer to become the director of athletic equipment operations at USC. He said that he was "too young to retire" at age 65, and wanted to be "around young people and keep me young". In 2001, Brooks missed work for two months due to problems with his head related to the beaning at Giants Stadium. He first experienced problems several years earlier. He retired in 2005 after five years with the Trojans.

== Honors ==
In 2022, Brooks was among the Pro Football Hall of Fame's inaugural recipients of its Awards of Excellence for off-the-field contributions to the NFL. He was made an honorary Blue Angel in 1996.

== Personal life ==
Brooks and his wife, Gerri, were married for 38 years. They had three sons and a daughter. He wrote a book about his experiences, Sid Brooks' Tales from the San Diego Chargers Locker Room, which was published in 2006.

On April 14, 2007, Brooks died at home in Gilbert, Arizona, after a head injury from a fall at a health club sauna. He was 72.

== Publications ==
- Brooks, Sid; Brooks, Gerri (2006). Sid Brooks' Tales from the San Diego Chargers Locker Room. Sports Publishing. ISBN 9781596700970.
