= Sherard Parker =

Canadian actor (born 1980)

- Born: 10 March 1980 (age 46)
- Occupation: Actor
- Years active: 2003–present

Sherard Parker (born 10 March 1980) is a Canadian actor. He has appeared on the Australian Television series MDA (2005) and in The Recruit (2003).

== Career ==
Parker's first appeared in Roger Donaldson's CIA thriller The Recruit (2003) starring Al Pacino, playing a CIA agent and recently in Il Futuro (2013), with Rutger Hauer and notably in the British independent film He Who Dares (2014) playing an SAS captain. His theatre credits include an adaptation of Louise M. Alcott's Little Women, where he played the role of German professor Bhaer at the Singapore Repertory Theatre.

== Filmography ==
- Island (short) (2004)
- MDA (TV series) (2005)
- The Good Samaritan (short) (2005)
- The Chase (short) (2006)
- THE CHASE (short) (2012)
