= Dave Brown (quarterback) =

American football player (born 1970)

No. 17
- Position: Quarterback

Personal information
- Born: February 25, 1970 (age 56); Summit, New Jersey, U.S.
- Listed height: 6 ft 6 in (1.98 m)
- Listed weight: 230 lb (104 kg)

Career information
- High school: Westfield (Westfield, New Jersey)
- College: Duke
- Supplemental draft: 1992: 1st round

Career history
- New York Giants (1992–1997); Arizona Cardinals (1998–2001)

Career NFL statistics
- Passing attempts: 1,634
- Passing completions: 892
- Completion percentage: 54.6%
- TD–INT: 44–58
- Passing yards: 10,248
- Passer rating: 67.9
- Stats at Pro Football Reference

David Michael Brown (born February 25, 1970) is an American former professional football player who was a quarterback in the National Football League (NFL) for the New York Giants and Arizona Cardinals. He played college football for the Duke Blue Devils.

Brown grew up in Westfield, New Jersey, and played high school football at Westfield High School, graduating in 1988.

After his career in football, Brown went on to become a director at New York Life Investment Management. In 2008, he joined Lehman Brothers where he served as a Senior Vice President of Lehman's Private Fund Marketing Group. Brown left Lehman Brothers in 2008 to become the Co-Head of Greenhill's Private Capital Advisory Group. In 2015, he joined Moelis & Company to lead their new private equity fundraising business.

== College ==
Brown had a successful career at Duke University. In his November 4, 1989, starting debut he threw for 444 yards against Wake Forest University, including a 97-yard touchdown to wide receiver Clarkston Hines to establish Duke's longest play from scrimmage. Later that month, Brown set a school single-game record with 479 passing yards against the University of North Carolina at Chapel Hill, upending Duke's rival, 41–0, to finish the year with seven straight wins and a share of the Atlantic Coast Conference championship. The Blue Devils subsequently received a bid to play in the All-American Bowl, Duke's first bowl game in almost 30 years. In 1991, Brown was chosen as the recipient of Duke's Carmen Falcone Team MVP Award.

Brown ranks in the top ten in the following categories for Duke football quarterbacks: pass attempts in a season (#4, 437), pass attempts in a career (#5, 845), pass attempts in a game (#8, 54), pass completions in a game (#5, 33), pass completions in a season (#5, 230), pass completions in a career (#5, 463), passing yards in a game (#1, 479), passing yards in a season (#5, 2,794), passing yards in a career (#5, 5,717), touchdown passes in a game (#2, 4), touchdown passes in a season (#3, 20), touchdown passes in a career (#4, 42), 300-yard passing games in a season (#2, 4), 400-yard passing games in a career (#3, 8), 400-yard passing games in a season (#1, 2), and 400-yard passing games in a career (#2, 2).

Brown ranks in the top ten in the following categories for Duke football offensive players: total offensive yards in a season (#5, 2,851), total offensive yards in a career(#5, 5,770), total offensive yards in a game (#2, 470), and two-point attempts in a game (#1, 3).

- 1989: Threw for 1,479 yards with 14 TD vs 6 INT in just 8 games. This would be his only season under head coach Steve Spurrier before Spurrier was replaced by Barry Wilson.
- 1990: Threw for 1,444 yards with 8 TD vs 12 INT.
- 1991: Threw for 2,794 yards with 20 TD vs 15 INT on 437 pass attempts. Would also run for 5 TD.

== NFL ==
Brown was drafted by the Giants as the top overall selection in the 1992 supplemental draft. His first appearance came on December 12, 1992, when he was forced into the lineup due to injuries of Phil Simms, Jeff Hostetler, and Kent Graham, dropping a 19–0 decision to the Phoenix Cardinals. To make matters worse, Brown himself was injured during the game and did not play a down the rest of the season.

Following Simms' release after the following season, Brown won the starting job in 1994 and helped guide his team to a 9–7 record, including a season-ending six-game winning streak. However, the Giants won only a combined 11 games in the next two seasons and their offense finished statistically worst in the league in 1996. This finish led to the firing of Dan Reeves, and the hiring of noted QB guru Jim Fassel.

After injuring his chest during a game against the Dallas Cowboys, Brown lost his starting job in 1997 and was never able to re-claim it. Jim Fassel went the rest of the season with Danny Kanell at quarterback and had an unexpected run to the playoffs and division title. In the off-season Brown was signed by the Arizona Cardinals to play primarily as a backup, and he ended up finishing his career in 2001 with Arizona.

Following his career in professional football, Brown moved on to investment management.

== NFL career statistics ==
Year	Team	Games			Passing									Rushing					Sacked	
Year	Team	GP	GS	Record	Cmp	Att	Pct	Yds	Y/A	Lng	TD	Int	Rtg	Att	Yds	Y/A	Lng	TD	Sck	Yds
1992	NYG	2	0	—	4	7	57.1	21	3.0	8	0	0	62.2	2	-1	-0.5	1	0	4	9
1993	NYG	1	0	—	0	0	—	0	0.0	0	0	0	—	3	-4	-1.3	-1	0	0	0
1994	NYG	15	15	9–6	201	350	57.4	2,536	7.2	53	12	16	72.5	60	196	3.3	21	2	42	248
1995	NYG	16	16	5–11	254	456	55.7	2,814	6.2	57	11	10	73.1	45	228	5.1	23	4	44	206
1996	NYG	16	16	6–10	214	398	53.8	2,412	6.1	37	12	20	61.3	50	170	3.4	18	0	49	276
1997	NYG	7	6	3–3	93	180	51.7	1,023	5.7	62	5	3	71.1	17	29	1.7	7	1	13	67
1998	ARI	1	0	—	2	5	40.0	31	6.2	19	0	0	61.2	1	2	2.0	2	0	1	6
1999	ARI	8	5	3–2	84	169	49.7	944	5.6	71	2	6	55.9	13	49	3.8	10	0	18	130
2000	ARI	6	2	0–2	40	69	58.0	467	6.8	44	2	3	70.1	1	0	0.0	0	0	10	53
2001	ARI	1	0	—	0	0	—	0	0.0	0	0	0	—	—	—	—	—	—	0	0
Career		73	60	26–34	892	1,634	54.6	10,248	6.3	71	44	58	67.9	192	669	3.5	23	7	181	1,005

== See also ==
- History of the New York Giants (1994–present)
