= Mike Sherrard =

American football player (born 1963)

No. 86, 88
- Position: Wide receiver

Personal information
- Born: June 21, 1963 (age 63); Oakland, California, U.S.
- Listed height: 6 ft 1 in (1.85 m)
- Listed weight: 185 lb (84 kg)

Career information
- High school: Chico (Chico, California)
- College: UCLA
- NFL draft: 1986: 1st round, 18th overall pick

Career history
- Dallas Cowboys (1986–1988); San Francisco 49ers (1989–1992); New York Giants (1993–1995); Denver Broncos (1996)

Awards and highlights
- Super Bowl champion (XXIV); First-team All-Pac-10 (1983)

Career NFL statistics
- Receptions: 257
- Receiving yards: 3,931
- Receiving touchdowns: 22
- Stats at Pro Football Reference

Michael Watson Sherrard (born June 21, 1963) is an American former professional football player who was a wide receiver in the National Football League (NFL) for the Dallas Cowboys, San Francisco 49ers, New York Giants, and Denver Broncos. He played college football for the UCLA Bruins. Sherrard was selected in the first round of the 1986 NFL draft.

== Early life ==
Sherrard attended Chico High School in Chico, California, where he was a multi-sport athlete, lettering in football, basketball, baseball and track.

He moved on to UCLA as an unrecruited walk-on athlete and was redshirted after breaking his finger in fall practice. The next year, he suffered from mononucleosis when he reported for spring practice and registered only 2 receptions during the season, while backing up wide receivers Dokie Williams and Jo-Jo Townsell.

Sherrard became a starter as a sophomore in 1983, posting 48 receptions (school record) for 709 yards. He also was the first player in school history to have 2 games of more than 135 receiving yards; 136 yards against the University of Washington and 140 yards against Arizona State University. The next year, he had 43 catches, becoming the first player in school history to have two seasons with more than 40 receptions, while also tallying a career-high 729 receiving yards.

As a senior, he was having his best season until breaking his clavicle in the first half of the fifth game against Arizona State University. He missed five contests and returned for the season finale against USC. He also played in the 1986 Rose Bowl 45–28 win against the University of Iowa, where he had 4 receptions and one touchdown.

Sherrard left as the school's all-time leading receiver in a season and a career with 124 receptions for 1,937 yards and 9 touchdowns.

== Professional career ==
=== Dallas Cowboys ===
In the 1986 NFL draft the Dallas Cowboys traded up from the 20th to the 18th position with the San Francisco 49ers, in exchange for a fifth round draft choice (#131-Patrick Miller), in order to select Sherrard, who became only the second wide receiver ever drafted by the franchise in the first round (Dennis Homan was the first one in 1968).

Sherrard started what seemed to be a very promising NFL career, becoming a starter in the thirteenth game against the Seattle Seahawks. He played in all 16 games (4 starts), registering 41 receptions for 744 yards, an 18.2-yard average (led the team) and 5 receiving touchdowns (led the team). At the time his totals ranked third for most receptions, third for most receiving yards, and second for most receiving touchdowns by a rookie in franchise history.

In 1987, he came into training camp as the Cowboys best wide receiver, but was lost for the year when he was tripped by a defender during a scrimmage on August 5, shattering two bones (the tibia and fibula) in his right leg. He also missed the 1988 season, when he re-fractured his right leg tibia and also the shin bone, while jogging on a Santa Monica beach as part of his rehab treatment in March.

=== San Francisco 49ers ===
The San Francisco 49ers signed Sherrard in Plan B free agency in 1989, but put him on the Physically Unable to Perform list for the entire regular season, allowing him plenty of time to heal for the playoffs, where he caught 3 passes for 40 yards and was a part of the Super Bowl XXIV winning team.

In 1990, he was off to a solid start, but broke his right fibula in a 20–17 win over the Cleveland Browns during the seventh game and was placed on the injured reserve list on October 29. He finished with 17 receptions for 264 yards and 2 touchdowns. The next season, he played in all 16 games, posting 24 receptions for 296 yards and 2 touchdowns.

In 1992, he appeared in all 16 games (8 starts), tallying 38 catches for 607 yards, including 6 catches for 159 yards against the Buffalo Bills.

=== New York Giants ===
On April 7, 1993, he signed as a free agent with the New York Giants. He was off to a great start with 24 receptions for 433 yards and 2 touchdowns through the first 6 games, but lost the rest of the season after suffering a partially dislocated left hip and a fractured hip socket against the Philadelphia Eagles. He also had injury complications when he was diagnosed as having a blood clot on the same hip.

His best professional season came in 1994, when he had career-highs in starts (14), receptions (53), receiving yards (825) and touchdowns (6). The next year, although he missed most of the preseason with a hamstring injury, he played in 13 games (13 starts), catching 44 receptions for 577 yards and 4 touchdowns. He missed the 12th and 13th games with a ruptured blood vessel above his right knee.

=== Denver Broncos ===
On May 5, 1996, he signed as a free agent with the Denver Broncos, where he only played one season as a reserve, before announcing his retirement on August 6, 1997. Sherrard persevered through multiple injuries and doubts about his future, to play 11 seasons in the NFL, recording 257 receptions for 3,931 yards and 22 touchdowns.

== NFL career statistics ==
Legend
	Won the Super Bowl
**Bold**	Career high

=== Regular season ===
Year	Team	Games		Receiving				
Year	Team	GP	GS	Rec	Yds	Avg	Lng	TD
1986	DAL	**16**	4	41	744	**18.1**	**68**	5
1990	SFO	7	2	17	264	15.5	43	2
1991	SFO	**16**	0	24	296	12.3	31	2
1992	SFO	**16**	8	38	607	16.0	56	0
1993	NYG	6	5	24	433	18.0	55	2
1994	NYG	**16**	**14**	**53**	**825**	15.6	55	**6**
1995	NYG	13	13	44	577	13.1	57	4
1996	DEN	15	0	16	185	11.6	25	1
		105	46	257	3,931	15.3	68	22

=== Playoffs ===
Year	Team	Games		Receiving				
Year	Team	GP	GS	Rec	Yds	Avg	Lng	TD
1989	SFO	**3**	0	3	**34**	11.3	**15**	0
1990	SFO	2	0	**5**	24	4.8	8	**1**
1992	SFO	2	0	1	15	**15.0**	**15**	0
1996	DEN	1	0	0	0	0.0	0	0
		8	0	9	73	8.1	15	1

== Personal life ==
Sherrard's mother Cherrie, ran the 80-yard hurdles in the 1964 Summer Olympics, where she was a teammate of Bob Hayes. She won a gold medal in the 1967 Pan American Games. His father Robert, played college basketball, semi-pro baseball and was a college professor at California State University. He is a cousin of Pro Football Hall of Fame cornerback Darrell Green.

After retirement, Sherrard worked as a fundraiser for Autism Speaks. He currently lives in Westlake Village, California with his daughter and two sons and is involved in television production.

In 2010, he was hired as the wide receivers coach at Oaks Christian School. In 2014, he was the offensive coordinator at Oaks Christian. In 2015, he was hired as the wide receivers coach at Newbury Park High School.
