= NFL playoff results =

Annual and franchise records

NFL playoff results is a listing of the year-by-year results of the NFL Playoff games to determine the final two teams for the championship game. The winners of those games are listed in NFL Championship Game article.
The overall franchise records are shown in the last table.

== NFL playoff game results 1933–1966 ==
Beginning with the 1933 season, the NFL featured a championship game, played between the winners of its two divisions. In this era, if there was a tie for first place in the division at the end of the regular season, a one-game playoff was used to determine the team that would represent their division in the NFL Championship Game. This happened nine times during this era.

Teams who went on to win the NFL Championship Game that season are in bold.

| Playoffs | Title at Issue | Winner | Score | Loser | Ref. |
|---|---|---|---|---|---|
| 1941 | Western Division | **Chicago Bears** | 33–14 | Green Bay Packers | |
| 1943 | Eastern Division | Washington Redskins | 28–0 | New York Giants | |
| 1947 | Eastern Division | Philadelphia Eagles | 21–0 | Pittsburgh Steelers | |
| 1950 | American Conference | **Cleveland Browns** | 8–3 | New York Giants | |
| 1950 | National Conference | Los Angeles Rams | 24–14 | Chicago Bears | |
| 1952 | National Conference | **Detroit Lions** | 31–21 | Los Angeles Rams | |
| 1957 | Western Conference | **Detroit Lions** | 31–27 | San Francisco 49ers | |
| 1958 | Eastern Conference | New York Giants | 10–0 | Cleveland Browns | |
| 1965 | Western Conference | **Green Bay Packers** | 13–10 (OT) | Baltimore Colts | |

== NFL Conference Championship game results 1967–1969 ==
For the 1967 season, the NFL split into four divisions (two conferences of two divisions each). Each of the four division champions played in their respective Conference Championship Game, with those winners advancing to the NFL Championship Game. 1967 was the first year where a pre-scheduled playoff (rather than regular season results) determined participation in the championship. It also marked the first year in which if there was a tie for first place in a division, the division champion was determined by a system of tiebreakers, rather than via a playoff game (as detailed in the 1933–1966 era above).

NFL Championship winner in bold, who then faced the AFL champion in the AFL-NFL World Championship Game (later to be known as the Super Bowl)

| Year | Eastern Conference Championship | | | | Western Conference Championship | | | |
| Year | Champion | Score | Runner-up | Ref | Champion | Score | Runner-up | Ref |
|---|---|---|---|---|---|---|---|---|
| **1967** | Dallas Cowboys | 52–14 | Cleveland Browns | | **Green Bay Packers** | 28–7 | Los Angeles Rams | |
| **1968** | Cleveland Browns | 31–20 | Dallas Cowboys | | **Baltimore Colts** | 24–14 | Minnesota Vikings | |
| **1969** | Cleveland Browns | 38–14 | Dallas Cowboys | | **Minnesota Vikings** | 23–20 | Los Angeles Rams | |

== NFL Wild Card Round game results 1978–present ==
In 1978, the NFL expanded its playoffs pool from 8 to 10 teams, requiring the addition of another round of playoffs. From 1978 to 1989, this round featured one game per conference between the two wild-card (non-division winners) and thus the name "Wild Card" round. In 1982, the league held a 16-team tournament due to the players strike, which reduced the regular season to just 9 games. The playoffs expanded to 12 teams for the 1990 season, and again to 14 teams for the 2020 season, with an additional game added to this week in each year.

Teams who later went on to win the Super Bowl that season are in bold. Home teams in italics.

| Year | AFC | | | | NFC | | | |
| Year | Winner | Score | Loser | Ref. | Winner | Score | Loser | Ref. |
|---|---|---|---|---|---|---|---|---|
| 1978–79 | Houston Oilers | 17–9 | Miami Dolphins | | Atlanta Falcons | 14–13 | Philadelphia Eagles | |
| 1979–80 | Houston Oilers | 13–7 | Denver Broncos | | Philadelphia Eagles | 27–17 | Chicago Bears | |
| 1980–81 | **Oakland Raiders** | 27–7 | Houston Oilers | | Dallas Cowboys | 34–13 | Los Angeles Rams | |
| 1981–82 | Buffalo Bills | 31–27 | New York Jets | | New York Giants | 27–21 | Philadelphia Eagles | |
| 1982–83 | Miami Dolphins | 28–13 | New England Patriots | | **Washington Redskins** | 31–7 | Detroit Lions | |
| 1982–83 | Los Angeles Raiders | 27–10 | Cleveland Browns | | Green Bay Packers | 41–16 | St. Louis Cardinals | |
| 1982–83 | New York Jets | 44–17 | Cincinnati Bengals | | Minnesota Vikings | 30–24 | Atlanta Falcons | |
| 1982–83 | San Diego Chargers | 31–28 | Pittsburgh Steelers | | Dallas Cowboys | 30–17 | Tampa Bay Buccaneers | |
| 1983–84 | Seattle Seahawks | 31–7 | Denver Broncos | | Los Angeles Rams | 24–17 | Dallas Cowboys | |
| 1984–85 | Seattle Seahawks | 13–7 | Los Angeles Raiders | | New York Giants | 16–13 | Los Angeles Rams | |
| 1985–86 | New England Patriots | 26–14 | New York Jets | | New York Giants | 17–3 | San Francisco 49ers | |
| 1986–87 | New York Jets | 35–15 | Kansas City Chiefs | | Washington Redskins | 19–7 | Los Angeles Rams | |
| 1987–88 | Houston Oilers | 23–20 (OT) | Seattle Seahawks | | Minnesota Vikings | 44–10 | New Orleans Saints | |
| 1988–89 | Houston Oilers | 24–23 | Cleveland Browns | | Minnesota Vikings | 28–17 | Los Angeles Rams | |
| 1989–90 | Pittsburgh Steelers | 26–23 (OT) | Houston Oilers | | Los Angeles Rams | 21–7 | Philadelphia Eagles | |
| 1990–91 | Miami Dolphins | 17–16 | Kansas City Chiefs | | Washington Redskins | 20–6 | Philadelphia Eagles | |
| 1990–91 | Cincinnati Bengals | 41–14 | Houston Oilers | | Chicago Bears | 16–6 | New Orleans Saints | |
| 1991–92 | Kansas City Chiefs | 10–6 | Los Angeles Raiders | | Atlanta Falcons | 27–20 | New Orleans Saints | |
| 1991–92 | Houston Oilers | 17–10 | New York Jets | | Dallas Cowboys | 17–13 | Chicago Bears | |
| 1992–93 | San Diego Chargers | 17–0 | Kansas City Chiefs | | Washington Redskins | 24–7 | Minnesota Vikings | |
| 1992–93 | Buffalo Bills | 41–38 (OT) | Houston Oilers | | Philadelphia Eagles | 36–20 | New Orleans Saints | |
| 1993–94 | Kansas City Chiefs | 27–24 (OT) | Pittsburgh Steelers | | Green Bay Packers | 28–24 | Detroit Lions | |
| 1993–94 | Los Angeles Raiders | 42–24 | Denver Broncos | | New York Giants | 17–10 | Minnesota Vikings | |
| 1994–95 | Miami Dolphins | 27–17 | Kansas City Chiefs | | Green Bay Packers | 16–12 | Detroit Lions | |
| 1994–95 | Cleveland Browns | 20–13 | New England Patriots | | Chicago Bears | 35–18 | Minnesota Vikings | |
| 1995–96 | Buffalo Bills | 37–22 | Miami Dolphins | | Philadelphia Eagles | 58–37 | Detroit Lions | |
| 1995–96 | Indianapolis Colts | 35–20 | San Diego Chargers | | Green Bay Packers | 37–20 | Atlanta Falcons | |
| 1996–97 | Jacksonville Jaguars | 30–27 | Buffalo Bills | | Dallas Cowboys | 40–15 | Minnesota Vikings | |
| 1996–97 | Pittsburgh Steelers | 42–14 | Indianapolis Colts | | San Francisco 49ers | 14–0 | Philadelphia Eagles | |
| 1997–98 | **Denver Broncos** | 42–17 | Jacksonville Jaguars | | Minnesota Vikings | 23–22 | New York Giants | |
| 1997–98 | New England Patriots | 17–3 | Miami Dolphins | | Tampa Bay Buccaneers | 20–10 | Detroit Lions | |
| 1998–99 | Miami Dolphins | 24–17 | Buffalo Bills | | Arizona Cardinals | 20–7 | Dallas Cowboys | |
| 1998–99 | Jacksonville Jaguars | 25–10 | New England Patriots | | San Francisco 49ers | 30–27 | Green Bay Packers | |
| 1999–00 | Tennessee Titans | 22–16 | Buffalo Bills | | Washington Redskins | 27–13 | Detroit Lions | |
| 1999–00 | Miami Dolphins | 20–17 | Seattle Seahawks | | Minnesota Vikings | 27–10 | Dallas Cowboys | |
| 2000–01 | Miami Dolphins | 23–17 (OT) | Indianapolis Colts | | New Orleans Saints | 31–28 | St. Louis Rams | |
| 2000–01 | **Baltimore Ravens** | 21–3 | Denver Broncos | | Philadelphia Eagles | 21–3 | Tampa Bay Buccaneers | |
| 2001–02 | Oakland Raiders | 38–24 | New York Jets | | Philadelphia Eagles | 31–9 | Tampa Bay Buccaneers | |
| 2001–02 | Baltimore Ravens | 20–3 | Miami Dolphins | | Green Bay Packers | 25–15 | San Francisco 49ers | |
| 2002–03 | New York Jets | 41–0 | Indianapolis Colts | | Atlanta Falcons | 27–7 | Green Bay Packers | |
| 2002–03 | Pittsburgh Steelers | 36–33 | Cleveland Browns | | San Francisco 49ers | 39–38 | New York Giants | |
| 2003–04 | Tennessee Titans | 20–17 | Baltimore Ravens | | Carolina Panthers | 29–10 | Dallas Cowboys | |
| 2003–04 | Indianapolis Colts | 41–10 | Denver Broncos | | Green Bay Packers | 33–27 (OT) | Seattle Seahawks | |
| 2004–05 | New York Jets | 20–17 (OT) | San Diego Chargers | | St. Louis Rams | 27–20 | Seattle Seahawks | |
| 2004–05 | Indianapolis Colts | 49–24 | Denver Broncos | | Minnesota Vikings | 31–17 | Green Bay Packers | |
| 2005–06 | New England Patriots | 28–3 | Jacksonville Jaguars | | Washington Redskins | 17–10 | Tampa Bay Buccaneers | |
| 2005–06 | **Pittsburgh Steelers** | 31–17 | Cincinnati Bengals | | Carolina Panthers | 23–0 | New York Giants | |
| 2006–07 | **Indianapolis Colts** | 23–8 | Kansas City Chiefs | | Seattle Seahawks | 21–20 | Dallas Cowboys | |
| 2006–07 | New England Patriots | 37–16 | New York Jets | | Philadelphia Eagles | 23–20 | New York Giants | |
| 2007–08 | Jacksonville Jaguars | 31–29 | Pittsburgh Steelers | | Seattle Seahawks | 35–14 | Washington Redskins | |
| 2007–08 | San Diego Chargers | 17–6 | Tennessee Titans | | **New York Giants** | 24–14 | Tampa Bay Buccaneers | |
| 2008–09 | San Diego Chargers | 23–17 (OT) | Indianapolis Colts | | Arizona Cardinals | 30–24 | Atlanta Falcons | |
| 2008–09 | Baltimore Ravens | 27–9 | Miami Dolphins | | Philadelphia Eagles | 26–14 | Minnesota Vikings | |
| 2009–10 | New York Jets | 24–14 | Cincinnati Bengals | | Dallas Cowboys | 34–14 | Philadelphia Eagles | |
| 2009–10 | Baltimore Ravens | 33–14 | New England Patriots | | Arizona Cardinals | 51–45 (OT) | Green Bay Packers | |
| 2010–11 | New York Jets | 17–16 | Indianapolis Colts | | Seattle Seahawks | 41–36 | New Orleans Saints | |
| 2010–11 | Baltimore Ravens | 30–7 | Kansas City Chiefs | | **Green Bay Packers** | 21–16 | Philadelphia Eagles | |
| 2011–12 | Houston Texans | 31–10 | Cincinnati Bengals | | New Orleans Saints | 45–28 | Detroit Lions | |
| 2011–12 | Denver Broncos | 29–23 (OT) | Pittsburgh Steelers | | **New York Giants** | 24–2 | Atlanta Falcons | |
| 2012–13 | Houston Texans | 19–13 | Cincinnati Bengals | | Green Bay Packers | 24–10 | Minnesota Vikings | |
| 2012–13 | **Baltimore Ravens** | 24–9 | Indianapolis Colts | | Seattle Seahawks | 24–14 | Washington Redskins | |
| 2013–14 | Indianapolis Colts | 45–44 | Kansas City Chiefs | | New Orleans Saints | 26–24 | Philadelphia Eagles | |
| 2013–14 | San Diego Chargers | 27–10 | Cincinnati Bengals | | San Francisco 49ers | 23–20 | Green Bay Packers | |
| 2014–15 | Baltimore Ravens | 30–17 | Pittsburgh Steelers | | Carolina Panthers | 27–16 | Arizona Cardinals | |
| 2014–15 | Indianapolis Colts | 26–10 | Cincinnati Bengals | | Dallas Cowboys | 24–20 | Detroit Lions | |
| 2015–16 | Kansas City Chiefs | 30–0 | Houston Texans | | Seattle Seahawks | 10–9 | Minnesota Vikings | |
| 2015–16 | Pittsburgh Steelers | 18–16 | Cincinnati Bengals | | Green Bay Packers | 35–18 | Washington Redskins | |
| 2016–17 | Houston Texans | 27–14 | Oakland Raiders | | Seattle Seahawks | 26–6 | Detroit Lions | |
| 2016–17 | Pittsburgh Steelers | 30–12 | Miami Dolphins | | Green Bay Packers | 38–13 | New York Giants | |
| 2017–18 | Tennessee Titans | 22–21 | Kansas City Chiefs | | Atlanta Falcons | 26–13 | Los Angeles Rams | |
| 2017–18 | Jacksonville Jaguars | 10–3 | Buffalo Bills | | New Orleans Saints | 31–26 | Carolina Panthers | |
| 2018–19 | Indianapolis Colts | 21–7 | Houston Texans | | Dallas Cowboys | 24–22 | Seattle Seahawks | |
| 2018–19 | Los Angeles Chargers | 23–17 | Baltimore Ravens | | Philadelphia Eagles | 16–15 | Chicago Bears | |
| 2019–20 | Houston Texans | 22–19 (OT) | Buffalo Bills | | Minnesota Vikings | 26–20 (OT) | New Orleans Saints | |
| 2019–20 | Tennessee Titans | 20–13 | New England Patriots | | Seattle Seahawks | 17–9 | Philadelphia Eagles | |
| 2020–21 | Buffalo Bills | 27–24 | Indianapolis Colts | | Los Angeles Rams | 30–20 | Seattle Seahawks | |
| 2020–21 | Baltimore Ravens | 20–13 | Tennessee Titans | | **Tampa Bay Buccaneers** | 31–23 | Washington Football Team | |
| 2020–21 | Cleveland Browns | 48–37 | Pittsburgh Steelers | | New Orleans Saints | 21–9 | Chicago Bears | |
| 2021–22 | Cincinnati Bengals | 26–19 | Las Vegas Raiders | | Tampa Bay Buccaneers | 31–15 | Philadelphia Eagles | |
| 2021–22 | Buffalo Bills | 47–17 | New England Patriots | | San Francisco 49ers | 23–17 | Dallas Cowboys | |
| 2021–22 | Kansas City Chiefs | 42–21 | Pittsburgh Steelers | | **Los Angeles Rams** | 34–11 | Arizona Cardinals | |
| 2022–23 | Jacksonville Jaguars | 31–30 | Los Angeles Chargers | | San Francisco 49ers | 41–23 | Seattle Seahawks | |
| 2022–23 | Buffalo Bills | 34–31 | Miami Dolphins | | New York Giants | 31–24 | Minnesota Vikings | |
| 2022–23 | Cincinnati Bengals | 24–17 | Baltimore Ravens | | Dallas Cowboys | 31–24 | Tampa Bay Buccaneers | |
| 2023–24 | Houston Texans | 45–14 | Cleveland Browns | | Green Bay Packers | 48–32 | Dallas Cowboys | |
| 2023–24 | **Kansas City Chiefs** | 26–7 | Miami Dolphins | | Detroit Lions | 24–23 | Los Angeles Rams | |
| 2023–24 | Buffalo Bills | 31–17 | Pittsburgh Steelers | | Tampa Bay Buccaneers | 32–9 | Philadelphia Eagles | |
| 2024–25 | Houston Texans | 32–12 | Los Angeles Chargers | | **Philadelphia Eagles** | 22–10 | Green Bay Packers | |
| 2024–25 | Baltimore Ravens | 28–14 | Pittsburgh Steelers | | Washington Commanders | 23–20 | Tampa Bay Buccaneers | |
| 2024–25 | Buffalo Bills | 31–7 | Denver Broncos | | Los Angeles Rams | 27–9 | Minnesota Vikings | |
| 2025–26 | Buffalo Bills | 27–24 | Jacksonville Jaguars | | Los Angeles Rams | 34–31 | Carolina Panthers | |
| 2025–26 | New England Patriots | 16–3 | Los Angeles Chargers | | Chicago Bears | 31–27 | Green Bay Packers | |
| 2025–26 | Houston Texans | 30–6 | Pittsburgh Steelers | | San Francisco 49ers | 23–19 | Philadelphia Eagles | |
| Year | Winner | Score | Loser | Ref. | Winner | Score | Loser | Ref. |
| Year | AFC | | | | NFC | | | |

== NFL Divisional Round game results 1970–present ==
Starting with the 1970 merger with the American Football League the NFL expanded its playoffs to 8 teams total. The round of 8 has traditionally been known as the "Divisional" round.

Teams who later went on to win the Super Bowl that season are in bold.

| Year | AFC | | | | NFC | | | |
| Year | Winner | Score | Loser | Ref. | Winner | Score | Loser | Ref. |
|---|---|---|---|---|---|---|---|---|
| 1970–71 | **Baltimore Colts** | 17–0 | Cincinnati Bengals | | Dallas Cowboys | 5–0 | Detroit Lions | |
| 1970–71 | Oakland Raiders | 21–14 | Miami Dolphins | | San Francisco 49ers | 17–14 | Minnesota Vikings | |
| 1971–72 | Miami Dolphins | 27–24 (2OT) | Kansas City Chiefs | | **Dallas Cowboys** | 20–12 | Minnesota Vikings | |
| 1971–72 | Baltimore Colts | 20–3 | Cleveland Browns | | San Francisco 49ers | 24–20 | Washington Redskins | |
| 1972–73 | Pittsburgh Steelers | 13–7 | Oakland Raiders | | Dallas Cowboys | 30–28 | San Francisco 49ers | |
| 1972–73 | **Miami Dolphins** | 20–14 | Cleveland Browns | | Washington Redskins | 16–3 | Green Bay Packers | |
| 1973–74 | Oakland Raiders | 33–14 | Pittsburgh Steelers | | Minnesota Vikings | 27–20 | Washington Redskins | |
| 1973–74 | **Miami Dolphins** | 34–16 | Cincinnati Bengals | | Dallas Cowboys | 27–16 | Los Angeles Rams | |
| 1974–75 | Oakland Raiders | 28–26 | Miami Dolphins | | Minnesota Vikings | 30–14 | St. Louis Cardinals | |
| 1974–75 | **Pittsburgh Steelers** | 32–14 | Buffalo Bills | | Los Angeles Rams | 19–10 | Washington Redskins | |
| 1975–76 | **Pittsburgh Steelers** | 28–10 | Baltimore Colts | | Los Angeles Rams | 35–23 | St. Louis Cardinals | |
| 1975–76 | Oakland Raiders | 31–28 | Cincinnati Bengals | | Dallas Cowboys | 17–14 | Minnesota Vikings | |
| 1976–77 | **Oakland Raiders** | 24–21 | New England Patriots | | Minnesota Vikings | 35–20 | Washington Redskins | |
| 1976–77 | Pittsburgh Steelers | 40–14 | Baltimore Colts | | Los Angeles Rams | 14–12 | Dallas Cowboys | |
| 1977–78 | Denver Broncos | 34–21 | Pittsburgh Steelers | | **Dallas Cowboys** | 37–7 | Chicago Bears | |
| 1977–78 | Oakland Raiders | 37–31 (2OT) | Baltimore Colts | | Minnesota Vikings | 14–7 | Los Angeles Rams | |
| 1978–79 | **Pittsburgh Steelers** | 33–10 | Denver Broncos | | Dallas Cowboys | 27–20 | Atlanta Falcons | |
| 1978–79 | Houston Oilers | 31–14 | New England Patriots | | Los Angeles Rams | 34–10 | Minnesota Vikings | |
| 1979–80 | Houston Oilers | 17–14 | San Diego Chargers | | Tampa Bay Buccaneers | 24–17 | Philadelphia Eagles | |
| 1979–80 | **Pittsburgh Steelers** | 34–14 | Miami Dolphins | | Los Angeles Rams | 21–19 | Dallas Cowboys | |
| 1980–81 | San Diego Chargers | 20–14 | Buffalo Bills | | Philadelphia Eagles | 31–16 | Minnesota Vikings | |
| 1980–81 | **Oakland Raiders** | 14–12 | Cleveland Browns | | Dallas Cowboys | 30–27 | Atlanta Falcons | |
| 1981–82 | San Diego Chargers | 41–38 (OT) | Miami Dolphins | | Dallas Cowboys | 38–0 | Tampa Bay Buccaneers | |
| 1981–82 | Cincinnati Bengals | 27–20 | Buffalo Bills | | **San Francisco 49ers** | 38–24 | New York Giants | |
| 1982–83 | New York Jets | 17–14 | Los Angeles Raiders | | **Washington Redskins** | 21–7 | Minnesota Vikings | |
| 1982–83 | Miami Dolphins | 34–13 | San Diego Chargers | | Dallas Cowboys | 37–26 | Green Bay Packers | |
| 1983–84 | Seattle Seahawks | 27–20 | Miami Dolphins | | San Francisco 49ers | 24–23 | Detroit Lions | |
| 1983–84 | **Los Angeles Raiders** | 38–10 | Pittsburgh Steelers | | Washington Redskins | 51–7 | Los Angeles Rams | |
| 1984–85 | Miami Dolphins | 31–10 | Seattle Seahawks | | **San Francisco 49ers** | 21–10 | New York Giants | |
| 1984–85 | Pittsburgh Steelers | 24–17 | Denver Broncos | | Chicago Bears | 23–19 | Washington Redskins | |
| 1985–86 | Miami Dolphins | 24–21 | Cleveland Browns | | Los Angeles Rams | 20–0 | Dallas Cowboys | |
| 1985–86 | New England Patriots | 27–20 | Los Angeles Raiders | | **Chicago Bears** | 21–0 | New York Giants | |
| 1986–87 | Cleveland Browns | 23–20 (2OT) | New York Jets | | Washington Redskins | 27–13 | Chicago Bears | |
| 1986–87 | Denver Broncos | 22–17 | New England Patriots | | **New York Giants** | 49–3 | San Francisco 49ers | |
| 1987–88 | Cleveland Browns | 38–21 | Indianapolis Colts | | Minnesota Vikings | 36–24 | San Francisco 49ers | |
| 1987–88 | Denver Broncos | 34–10 | Houston Oilers | | **Washington Redskins** | 21–17 | Chicago Bears | |
| 1988–89 | Cincinnati Bengals | 21–13 | Seattle Seahawks | | Chicago Bears | 20–12 | Philadelphia Eagles | |
| 1988–89 | Buffalo Bills | 17–10 | Houston Oilers | | **San Francisco 49ers** | 34–9 | Minnesota Vikings | |
| 1989–90 | Cleveland Browns | 34–30 | Buffalo Bills | | **San Francisco 49ers** | 41–13 | Minnesota Vikings | |
| 1989–90 | Denver Broncos | 24–23 | Pittsburgh Steelers | | Los Angeles Rams | 19–13 (OT) | New York Giants | |
| 1990–91 | Buffalo Bills | 44–34 | Miami Dolphins | | San Francisco 49ers | 28–10 | Washington Redskins | |
| 1990–91 | Los Angeles Raiders | 20–10 | Cincinnati Bengals | | **New York Giants** | 31–3 | Chicago Bears | |
| 1991–92 | Denver Broncos | 26–24 | Houston Oilers | | **Washington Redskins** | 24–7 | Atlanta Falcons | |
| 1991–92 | Buffalo Bills | 37–14 | Kansas City Chiefs | | Detroit Lions | 38–6 | Dallas Cowboys | |
| 1992–93 | Buffalo Bills | 24–3 | Pittsburgh Steelers | | San Francisco 49ers | 20–13 | Washington Redskins | |
| 1992–93 | Miami Dolphins | 31–0 | San Diego Chargers | | **Dallas Cowboys** | 34–10 | Philadelphia Eagles | |
| 1993–94 | Buffalo Bills | 29–23 | Los Angeles Raiders | | San Francisco 49ers | 44–3 | New York Giants | |
| 1993–94 | Kansas City Chiefs | 28–20 | Houston Oilers | | **Dallas Cowboys** | 27–17 | Green Bay Packers | |
| 1994–95 | Pittsburgh Steelers | 29–9 | Cleveland Browns | | **San Francisco 49ers** | 44–15 | Chicago Bears | |
| 1994–95 | San Diego Chargers | 22–21 | Miami Dolphins | | Dallas Cowboys | 35–9 | Green Bay Packers | |
| 1995–96 | Pittsburgh Steelers | 40–21 | Buffalo Bills | | Green Bay Packers | 27–17 | San Francisco 49ers | |
| 1995–96 | Indianapolis Colts | 10–7 | Kansas City Chiefs | | **Dallas Cowboys** | 30–11 | Philadelphia Eagles | |
| 1996–97 | Jacksonville Jaguars | 30–27 | Denver Broncos | | **Green Bay Packers** | 35–14 | San Francisco 49ers | |
| 1996–97 | New England Patriots | 28–3 | Pittsburgh Steelers | | Carolina Panthers | 26–17 | Dallas Cowboys | |
| 1997–98 | Pittsburgh Steelers | 7–6 | New England Patriots | | San Francisco 49ers | 38–22 | Minnesota Vikings | |
| 1997–98 | **Denver Broncos** | 14–10 | Kansas City Chiefs | | Green Bay Packers | 21–7 | Tampa Bay Buccaneers | |
| 1998–99 | **Denver Broncos** | 38–3 | Miami Dolphins | | Atlanta Falcons | 20–18 | San Francisco 49ers | |
| 1998–99 | New York Jets | 34–24 | Jacksonville Jaguars | | Minnesota Vikings | 41–21 | Arizona Cardinals | |
| 1999–00 | Jacksonville Jaguars | 62–7 | Miami Dolphins | | Tampa Bay Buccaneers | 14–13 | Washington Redskins | |
| 1999–00 | Tennessee Titans | 19–16 | Indianapolis Colts | | **St. Louis Rams** | 49–37 | Minnesota Vikings | |
| 2000–01 | Oakland Raiders | 27–0 | Miami Dolphins | | Minnesota Vikings | 34–16 | New Orleans Saints | |
| 2000–01 | **Baltimore Ravens** | 24–10 | Tennessee Titans | | New York Giants | 20–10 | Philadelphia Eagles | |
| 2001–02 | **New England Patriots** | 16–13 (OT) | Oakland Raiders | | Philadelphia Eagles | 33–19 | Chicago Bears | |
| 2001–02 | Pittsburgh Steelers | 27–10 | Baltimore Ravens | | St. Louis Rams | 45–17 | Green Bay Packers | |
| 2002–03 | Tennessee Titans | 34–31 (OT) | Pittsburgh Steelers | | Philadelphia Eagles | 20–6 | Atlanta Falcons | |
| 2002–03 | Oakland Raiders | 30–10 | New York Jets | | **Tampa Bay Buccaneers** | 31–6 | San Francisco 49ers | |
| 2003–04 | **New England Patriots** | 17–14 | Tennessee Titans | | Carolina Panthers | 29–23 (2OT) | St. Louis Rams | |
| 2003–04 | Indianapolis Colts | 38–31 | Kansas City Chiefs | | Philadelphia Eagles | 20–17 (OT) | Green Bay Packers | |
| 2004–05 | Pittsburgh Steelers | 20–17 (OT) | New York Jets | | Atlanta Falcons | 47–17 | St. Louis Rams | |
| 2004–05 | **New England Patriots** | 20–3 | Indianapolis Colts | | Philadelphia Eagles | 27–14 | Minnesota Vikings | |
| 2005–06 | Denver Broncos | 27–13 | New England Patriots | | Seattle Seahawks | 20–10 | Washington Redskins | |
| 2005–06 | **Pittsburgh Steelers** | 21–18 | Indianapolis Colts | | Carolina Panthers | 29–21 | Chicago Bears | |
| 2006–07 | **Indianapolis Colts** | 15–6 | Baltimore Ravens | | New Orleans Saints | 27–24 | Philadelphia Eagles | |
| 2006–07 | New England Patriots | 24–21 | San Diego Chargers | | Chicago Bears | 27–24 (OT) | Seattle Seahawks | |
| 2007–08 | New England Patriots | 31–20 | Jacksonville Jaguars | | Green Bay Packers | 42–20 | Seattle Seahawks | |
| 2007–08 | San Diego Chargers | 28–24 | Indianapolis Colts | | **New York Giants** | 21–17 | Dallas Cowboys | |
| 2008–09 | Baltimore Ravens | 13–10 | Tennessee Titans | | Arizona Cardinals | 33–13 | Carolina Panthers | |
| 2008–09 | **Pittsburgh Steelers** | 35–24 | San Diego Chargers | | Philadelphia Eagles | 23–11 | New York Giants | |
| 2009–10 | Indianapolis Colts | 20–3 | Baltimore Ravens | | **New Orleans Saints** | 45–14 | Arizona Cardinals | |
| 2009–10 | New York Jets | 17–14 | San Diego Chargers | | Minnesota Vikings | 34–3 | Dallas Cowboys | |
| 2010–11 | Pittsburgh Steelers | 31–24 | Baltimore Ravens | | **Green Bay Packers** | 48–21 | Atlanta Falcons | |
| 2010–11 | New York Jets | 28–21 | New England Patriots | | Chicago Bears | 35–24 | Seattle Seahawks | |
| 2011–12 | New England Patriots | 45–10 | Denver Broncos | | San Francisco 49ers | 36–32 | New Orleans Saints | |
| 2011–12 | Baltimore Ravens | 20–13 | Houston Texans | | **New York Giants** | 37–20 | Green Bay Packers | |
| 2012–13 | **Baltimore Ravens** | 38–35 (2OT) | Denver Broncos | | San Francisco 49ers | 45–31 | Green Bay Packers | |
| 2012–13 | New England Patriots | 41–28 | Houston Texans | | Atlanta Falcons | 30–28 | Seattle Seahawks | |
| 2013–14 | New England Patriots | 43–22 | Indianapolis Colts | | **Seattle Seahawks** | 23–15 | New Orleans Saints | |
| 2013–14 | Denver Broncos | 24–17 | San Diego Chargers | | San Francisco 49ers | 23–10 | Carolina Panthers | |
| 2014–15 | **New England Patriots** | 35–31 | Baltimore Ravens | | Seattle Seahawks | 31–17 | Carolina Panthers | |
| 2014–15 | Indianapolis Colts | 24–13 | Denver Broncos | | Green Bay Packers | 26–21 | Dallas Cowboys | |
| 2015–16 | New England Patriots | 27–20 | Kansas City Chiefs | | Arizona Cardinals | 26–20 (OT) | Green Bay Packers | |
| 2015–16 | **Denver Broncos** | 23–16 | Pittsburgh Steelers | | Carolina Panthers | 31–24 | Seattle Seahawks | |
| 2016–17 | **New England Patriots** | 34–16 | Houston Texans | | Atlanta Falcons | 36–20 | Seattle Seahawks | |
| 2016–17 | Pittsburgh Steelers | 18–16 | Kansas City Chiefs | | Green Bay Packers | 34–31 | Dallas Cowboys | |
| 2017–18 | New England Patriots | 35–14 | Tennessee Titans | | **Philadelphia Eagles** | 15–10 | Atlanta Falcons | |
| 2017–18 | Jacksonville Jaguars | 45–42 | Pittsburgh Steelers | | Minnesota Vikings | 29–24 | New Orleans Saints | |
| 2018–19 | Kansas City Chiefs | 31–13 | Indianapolis Colts | | Los Angeles Rams | 30–22 | Dallas Cowboys | |
| 2018–19 | **New England Patriots** | 41–28 | Los Angeles Chargers | | New Orleans Saints | 20–14 | Philadelphia Eagles | |
| 2019–20 | Tennessee Titans | 28–12 | Baltimore Ravens | | San Francisco 49ers | 27–10 | Minnesota Vikings | |
| 2019–20 | **Kansas City Chiefs** | 51–31 | Houston Texans | | Green Bay Packers | 28–23 | Seattle Seahawks | |
| 2020–21 | Buffalo Bills | 17–3 | Baltimore Ravens | | Green Bay Packers | 32–18 | Los Angeles Rams | |
| 2020–21 | Kansas City Chiefs | 22–17 | Cleveland Browns | | **Tampa Bay Buccaneers** | 30–20 | New Orleans Saints | |
| 2021–22 | Cincinnati Bengals | 19–16 | Tennessee Titans | | San Francisco 49ers | 13–10 | Green Bay Packers | |
| 2021–22 | Kansas City Chiefs | 42–36 (OT) | Buffalo Bills | | **Los Angeles Rams** | 30–27 | Tampa Bay Buccaneers | |
| 2022–23 | **Kansas City Chiefs** | 27–20 | Jacksonville Jaguars | | Philadelphia Eagles | 38–7 | New York Giants | |
| 2022–23 | Cincinnati Bengals | 27–10 | Buffalo Bills | | San Francisco 49ers | 19–12 | Dallas Cowboys | |
| 2023–24 | Baltimore Ravens | 34–10 | Houston Texans | | San Francisco 49ers | 24–21 | Green Bay Packers | |
| 2023–24 | **Kansas City Chiefs** | 27–24 | Buffalo Bills | | Detroit Lions | 31–23 | Tampa Bay Buccaneers | |
| 2024–25 | Kansas City Chiefs | 23–14 | Houston Texans | | Washington Commanders | 45–31 | Detroit Lions | |
| 2024–25 | Buffalo Bills | 27–25 | Baltimore Ravens | | **Philadelphia Eagles** | 28–22 | Los Angeles Rams | |
| 2025–26 | Denver Broncos | 33–30 (OT) | Buffalo Bills | | **Seattle Seahawks** | 41–6 | San Francisco 49ers | |
| 2025–26 | New England Patriots | 28–16 | Houston Texans | | Los Angeles Rams | 20–17 (OT) | Chicago Bears | |
| Year | Winner | Score | Loser | Ref. | Winner | Score | Loser | Ref. |
| Year | AFC | | | | NFC | | | |

== NFL Conference Championship game results 1970–present ==
Note: Since the AFL–NFL Merger, the playoffs have generally been held over two calendar years. For example, the Indianapolis Colts are regarded as the 2006 NFL Champions even though the Super Bowl was in February 2007.

Super Bowl winners are in bold.

| Year | AFC Championship Game | | | | NFC Championship Game | | | |
| Year | Winner | Score | Loser | Ref. | Winner | Score | Loser | Ref. |
|---|---|---|---|---|---|---|---|---|
| 1970–71 | **Baltimore Colts** | 27–17 | Oakland Raiders | | Dallas Cowboys | 17–10 | San Francisco 49ers | |
| 1971–72 | Miami Dolphins | 21–0 | Baltimore Colts | | **Dallas Cowboys** | 14–3 | San Francisco 49ers | |
| 1972–73 | **Miami Dolphins** | 21–17 | Pittsburgh Steelers | | Washington Redskins | 26–3 | Dallas Cowboys | |
| 1973–74 | **Miami Dolphins** | 27–10 | Oakland Raiders | | Minnesota Vikings | 27–10 | Dallas Cowboys | |
| 1974–75 | **Pittsburgh Steelers** | 24–13 | Oakland Raiders | | Minnesota Vikings | 14–10 | Los Angeles Rams | |
| 1975–76 | **Pittsburgh Steelers** | 16–10 | Oakland Raiders | | Dallas Cowboys | 37–7 | Los Angeles Rams | |
| 1976–77 | **Oakland Raiders** | 24–7 | Pittsburgh Steelers | | Minnesota Vikings | 24–13 | Los Angeles Rams | |
| 1977–78 | Denver Broncos | 20–17 | Oakland Raiders | | **Dallas Cowboys** | 23–6 | Minnesota Vikings | |
| 1978–79 | **Pittsburgh Steelers** | 34–5 | Houston Oilers | | Dallas Cowboys | 28–0 | Los Angeles Rams | |
| 1979–80 | **Pittsburgh Steelers** | 27–13 | Houston Oilers | | Los Angeles Rams | 9–0 | Tampa Bay Buccaneers | |
| 1980–81 | **Oakland Raiders** | 34–27 | San Diego Chargers | | Philadelphia Eagles | 20–7 | Dallas Cowboys | |
| 1981–82 | Cincinnati Bengals | 27–7 | San Diego Chargers | | **San Francisco 49ers** | 28–27 | Dallas Cowboys | |
| 1982–83 | Miami Dolphins | 14–0 | New York Jets | | **Washington Redskins** | 31–17 | Dallas Cowboys | |
| 1983–84 | **Los Angeles Raiders** | 30–14 | Seattle Seahawks | | Washington Redskins | 24–21 | San Francisco 49ers | |
| 1984–85 | Miami Dolphins | 45–28 | Pittsburgh Steelers | | **San Francisco 49ers** | 23–0 | Chicago Bears | |
| 1985–86 | New England Patriots | 31–14 | Miami Dolphins | | **Chicago Bears** | 24–0 | Los Angeles Rams | |
| 1986–87 | Denver Broncos | 23–20 (OT) | Cleveland Browns | | **New York Giants** | 17–0 | Washington Redskins | |
| 1987–88 | Denver Broncos | 38–33 | Cleveland Browns | | **Washington Redskins** | 17–10 | Minnesota Vikings | |
| 1988–89 | Cincinnati Bengals | 21–10 | Buffalo Bills | | **San Francisco 49ers** | 28–3 | Chicago Bears | |
| 1989–90 | Denver Broncos | 37–21 | Cleveland Browns | | **San Francisco 49ers** | 30–3 | Los Angeles Rams | |
| 1990–91 | Buffalo Bills | 51–3 | Los Angeles Raiders | | **New York Giants** | 15–13 | San Francisco 49ers | |
| 1991–92 | Buffalo Bills | 10–7 | Denver Broncos | | **Washington Redskins** | 41–10 | Detroit Lions | |
| 1992–93 | Buffalo Bills | 29–10 | Miami Dolphins | | **Dallas Cowboys** | 30–20 | San Francisco 49ers | |
| 1993–94 | Buffalo Bills | 30–13 | Kansas City Chiefs | | **Dallas Cowboys** | 38–21 | San Francisco 49ers | |
| 1994–95 | San Diego Chargers | 17–13 | Pittsburgh Steelers | | **San Francisco 49ers** | 38–28 | Dallas Cowboys | |
| 1995–96 | Pittsburgh Steelers | 20–16 | Indianapolis Colts | | **Dallas Cowboys** | 38–27 | Green Bay Packers | |
| 1996–97 | New England Patriots | 20–6 | Jacksonville Jaguars | | **Green Bay Packers** | 30–13 | Carolina Panthers | |
| 1997–98 | **Denver Broncos** | 24–21 | Pittsburgh Steelers | | Green Bay Packers | 23–10 | San Francisco 49ers | |
| 1998–99 | **Denver Broncos** | 23–10 | New York Jets | | Atlanta Falcons | 30–27 (OT) | Minnesota Vikings | |
| 1999–00 | Tennessee Titans | 33–14 | Jacksonville Jaguars | | **St. Louis Rams** | 11–6 | Tampa Bay Buccaneers | |
| 2000–01 | **Baltimore Ravens** | 16–3 | Oakland Raiders | | New York Giants | 41–0 | Minnesota Vikings | |
| 2001–02 | **New England Patriots** | 24–17 | Pittsburgh Steelers | | St. Louis Rams | 29–24 | Philadelphia Eagles | |
| 2002–03 | Oakland Raiders | 41–24 | Tennessee Titans | | **Tampa Bay Buccaneers** | 27–10 | Philadelphia Eagles | |
| 2003–04 | **New England Patriots** | 24–14 | Indianapolis Colts | | Carolina Panthers | 14–3 | Philadelphia Eagles | |
| 2004–05 | **New England Patriots** | 41–27 | Pittsburgh Steelers | | Philadelphia Eagles | 27–10 | Atlanta Falcons | |
| 2005–06 | **Pittsburgh Steelers** | 34–17 | Denver Broncos | | Seattle Seahawks | 34–14 | Carolina Panthers | |
| 2006–07 | **Indianapolis Colts** | 38–34 | New England Patriots | | Chicago Bears | 39–14 | New Orleans Saints | |
| 2007–08 | New England Patriots | 21–12 | San Diego Chargers | | **New York Giants** | 23–20 (OT) | Green Bay Packers | |
| 2008–09 | **Pittsburgh Steelers** | 23–14 | Baltimore Ravens | | Arizona Cardinals | 32–25 | Philadelphia Eagles | |
| 2009–10 | Indianapolis Colts | 30–17 | New York Jets | | **New Orleans Saints** | 31–28 (OT) | Minnesota Vikings | |
| 2010–11 | Pittsburgh Steelers | 24–19 | New York Jets | | **Green Bay Packers** | 21–14 | Chicago Bears | |
| 2011–12 | New England Patriots | 23–20 | Baltimore Ravens | | **New York Giants** | 20–17 (OT) | San Francisco 49ers | |
| 2012–13 | **Baltimore Ravens** | 28–13 | New England Patriots | | San Francisco 49ers | 28–24 | Atlanta Falcons | |
| 2013–14 | Denver Broncos | 26–16 | New England Patriots | | **Seattle Seahawks** | 23–17 | San Francisco 49ers | |
| 2014–15 | **New England Patriots** | 45–7 | Indianapolis Colts | | Seattle Seahawks | 28–22 (OT) | Green Bay Packers | |
| 2015–16 | **Denver Broncos** | 20–18 | New England Patriots | | Carolina Panthers | 49–15 | Arizona Cardinals | |
| 2016–17 | **New England Patriots** | 36–17 | Pittsburgh Steelers | | Atlanta Falcons | 44–21 | Green Bay Packers | |
| 2017–18 | New England Patriots | 24–20 | Jacksonville Jaguars | | **Philadelphia Eagles** | 38–7 | Minnesota Vikings | |
| 2018–19 | **New England Patriots** | 37–31 (OT) | Kansas City Chiefs | | Los Angeles Rams | 26–23 (OT) | New Orleans Saints | |
| 2019–20 | **Kansas City Chiefs** | 35–24 | Tennessee Titans | | San Francisco 49ers | 37–20 | Green Bay Packers | |
| 2020–21 | Kansas City Chiefs | 38–24 | Buffalo Bills | | **Tampa Bay Buccaneers** | 31–26 | Green Bay Packers | |
| 2021–22 | Cincinnati Bengals | 27–24 (OT) | Kansas City Chiefs | | **Los Angeles Rams** | 20–17 | San Francisco 49ers | |
| 2022–23 | **Kansas City Chiefs** | 23–20 | Cincinnati Bengals | | Philadelphia Eagles | 31–7 | San Francisco 49ers | |
| 2023–24 | **Kansas City Chiefs** | 17–10 | Baltimore Ravens | | San Francisco 49ers | 34–31 | Detroit Lions | |
| 2024–25 | Kansas City Chiefs | 32–29 | Buffalo Bills | | **Philadelphia Eagles** | 55–23 | Washington Commanders | |
| 2025–26 | New England Patriots | 10–7 | Denver Broncos | | **Seattle Seahawks** | 31–27 | Los Angeles Rams | |
| Year | Winner | Score | Loser | Ref. | Winner | Score | Loser | Ref. |
| Year | AFC Championship Game | | | | NFC Championship Game | | | |

== All-time playoff records (NFL/AFL) ==
Updated through the 2025-26 playoffs

Listed in order of (1) Overall Win Percentage (2) Number of games won
| | | | | Post NFL/AFL Merger | | | | | | | | | All | | | Pre NFL/AFL Merger | | | | | |
| Round: | Overall | | | Wild Card | | | Divisional | | | Conference | | | Super Bowl | | | League | | | Divisional | | |
| Active Team | W | L | Pct | W | L | Pct | W | L | Pct | W | L | Pct | W | L | Pct | W | L | Pct | W | L | Pct |
|---|---|---|---|---|---|---|---|---|---|---|---|---|---|---|---|---|---|---|---|---|---|
| New England Patriots | 40 | 23 | .635 | 5 | 6 | .455 | 16 | 6 | .727 | 12 | 4 | .750 | 6 | 6 | .500 | 0 | 1 | .000 | 1 | 0 | 1.000 |
| San Francisco 49ers | 40 | 26 | .606 | 7 | 2 | .778 | 19 | 8 | .704 | 8 | 11 | .421 | 5 | 3 | .625 | 0 | 1 | .000 | 1 | 1 | .500 |
| Green Bay Packers | 37 | 28 | .569 | 11 | 7 | .611 | 9 | 11 | .450 | 3 | 6 | .333 | 4 | 1 | .800 | 8 | 2 | .800 | 2 | 1 | .667 |
| Baltimore Ravens | 18 | 14 | .563 | 9 | 3 | .750 | 5 | 8 | .385 | 2 | 3 | .400 | 2 | 0 | 1.000 | | | | | | |
| Las Vegas Raiders | 25 | 20 | .556 | 4 | 4 | .500 | 11 | 5 | .688 | 4 | 7 | .364 | 3 | 2 | .600 | 1 | 2 | .333 | 2 | 0 | 1.000 |
| Pittsburgh Steelers | 36 | 30 | .545 | 6 | 10 | .375 | 16 | 9 | .640 | 8 | 8 | .500 | 6 | 2 | .750 | | | | 0 | 1 | .000 |
| Washington Commanders | 25 | 21 | .543 | 7 | 4 | .636 | 7 | 9 | .438 | 5 | 2 | .714 | 3 | 2 | .600 | 2 | 4 | .333 | 1 | 0 | 1.000 |
| Kansas City Chiefs | 26 | 22 | .542 | 5 | 8 | .385 | 8 | 7 | .533 | 5 | 3 | .625 | 4 | 3 | .571 | 3 | 0 | 1.000 | 1 | 1 | .500 |
| Dallas Cowboys | 36 | 31 | .537 | 8 | 7 | .533 | 14 | 11 | .560 | 8 | 6 | .571 | 5 | 3 | .625 | 0 | 2 | .000 | 1 | 2 | .333 |
| Denver Broncos | 24 | 21 | .533 | 2 | 7 | .222 | 11 | 6 | .647 | 8 | 3 | .727 | 3 | 5 | .375 | | | | | | |
| Philadelphia Eagles | 29 | 27 | .518 | 9 | 12 | .429 | 9 | 7 | .563 | 5 | 4 | .556 | 2 | 3 | .400 | 3 | 1 | .750 | 1 | 0 | 1.000 |
| Seattle Seahawks | 20 | 19 | .513 | 9 | 7 | .563 | 5 | 9 | .357 | 4 | 1 | .800 | 2 | 2 | .500 | | | | | | |
| Carolina Panthers | 9 | 9 | .500 | 3 | 2 | .600 | 4 | 3 | .571 | 2 | 2 | .500 | 0 | 2 | .000 | | | | | | |
| Los Angeles Rams | 29 | 30 | .492 | 7 | 7 | .500 | 12 | 7 | .632 | 5 | 7 | .417 | 2 | 3 | .400 | 2 | 3 | .400 | 1 | 3 | .250 |
| New York Giants | 25 | 26 | .490 | 7 | 5 | .583 | 5 | 7 | .417 | 5 | 0 | 1.000 | 4 | 1 | .800 | 3 | 11 | .214 | 1 | 2 | .333 |
| Buffalo Bills | 22 | 23 | .489 | 9 | 5 | .643 | 7 | 9 | .438 | 4 | 3 | .571 | 0 | 4 | .000 | 2 | 1 | .667 | 0 | 1 | .000 |
| Tampa Bay Buccaneers | 12 | 13 | .480 | 4 | 7 | .364 | 4 | 4 | .500 | 2 | 2 | .500 | 2 | 0 | 1.000 | | | | | | |
| New York Jets | 12 | 13 | .480 | 6 | 5 | .545 | 4 | 3 | .571 | 0 | 4 | .000 | 1 | 0 | 1.000 | 1 | 0 | 1.000 | 0 | 1 | .000 |
| Indianapolis Colts | 23 | 25 | .479 | 7 | 7 | .500 | 7 | 10 | .412 | 3 | 4 | .429 | 2 | 2 | .500 | 3 | 1 | .750 | 1 | 1 | .500 |
| Jacksonville Jaguars | 8 | 9 | .471 | 5 | 3 | .625 | 3 | 3 | .500 | 0 | 3 | .000 | 0 | 0 | .000 | | | | | | |
| Miami Dolphins | 20 | 23 | .465 | 6 | 8 | .429 | 7 | 10 | .412 | 5 | 2 | .714 | 2 | 3 | .400 | | | | | | |
| Chicago Bears | 18 | 21 | .462 | 3 | 4 | .429 | 5 | 8 | .385 | 2 | 3 | .400 | 1 | 1 | .500 | 6 | 4 | .600 | 1 | 1 | .500 |
| Houston Texans | 7 | 9 | .438 | 7 | 2 | .778 | 0 | 7 | .000 | 0 | 0 | .000 | 0 | 0 | .000 | | | | | | |
| Cleveland Browns | 17 | 22 | .436 | 2 | 4 | .333 | 3 | 6 | .333 | 0 | 3 | .000 | 0 | 0 | .000 | 8 | 7 | .533 | 4 | 2 | .667 |
| New Orleans Saints | 10 | 13 | .435 | 5 | 6 | .455 | 3 | 5 | .375 | 1 | 2 | .333 | 1 | 0 | 1.000 | | | | | | |
| Tennessee Titans | 17 | 23 | .425 | 9 | 6 | .600 | 5 | 9 | .357 | 1 | 4 | .200 | 0 | 1 | .000 | 2 | 2 | .500 | 0 | 1 | .000 |
| Atlanta Falcons | 10 | 14 | .417 | 4 | 4 | .500 | 4 | 6 | .400 | 2 | 2 | .500 | 0 | 2 | .000 | | | | | | |
| Arizona Cardinals | 7 | 10 | .412 | 3 | 3 | .500 | 2 | 4 | .333 | 1 | 1 | .500 | 0 | 1 | .000 | 1 | 1 | .500 | | | |
| Minnesota Vikings | 21 | 32 | .396 | 7 | 9 | .438 | 9 | 12 | .429 | 3 | 6 | .333 | 0 | 4 | .000 | 1 | 0 | 1.000 | 1 | 1 | .500 |
| Cincinnati Bengals | 10 | 16 | .385 | 3 | 8 | .273 | 4 | 4 | .500 | 3 | 1 | .750 | 0 | 3 | .000 | | | | | | |
| Detroit Lions | 9 | 15 | .375 | 1 | 9 | .100 | 2 | 3 | .400 | 0 | 2 | .000 | 0 | 0 | .000 | 4 | 1 | .800 | 2 | 0 | 1.000 |
| Los Angeles Chargers | 12 | 21 | .364 | 6 | 5 | .545 | 4 | 8 | .333 | 1 | 3 | .250 | 0 | 1 | .000 | 1 | 4 | .200 | | | |
| Team | W | L | Pct | W | L | Pct | W | L | Pct | W | L | Pct | W | L | Pct | W | L | Pct | W | L | Pct |
| Round: | Overall | | | Wild Card | | | Divisional | | | Conference | | | Super Bowl | | | League | | | Divisional | | |
| | | | | Post NFL/AFL Merger | | | | | | | | | All | | | Pre NFL/AFL Merger | | | | | |

== Pre-merger performance by team ==
| Franchise | Division (as of 1969) | # | CG | CH | 33 | 34 | 35 | 36 | 37 | 38 | 39 | 40 | 41 | 42 | 43 | 44 | 45 | 46 | 47 | 48 | 49 | 50 | 51 | 52 | 53 | 54 | 55 | 56 | 57 | 58 | 59 | 60 | 61 | 62 | 63 | 64 | 65 | 66 | 67 | 68 | 69 |
|---|---|---|---|---|---|---|---|---|---|---|---|---|---|---|---|---|---|---|---|---|---|---|---|---|---|---|---|---|---|---|---|---|---|---|---|---|---|---|---|---|---|
| Green Bay Packers | Central | 11 | 10 | 8 | | | | CH | | RU | CH | | TB | | | CH | | | | | | | | | | | | | | | | RU | CH | CH | | | CH | CH | CH | | |
| Chicago Bears | Central | 11 | 10 | 6 | CH | RU | | | RU | | | CH | CH | RU | CH | | | CH | | | | TB | | | | | | RU | | | | | | | CH | | | | | | |
| Cleveland Browns | Century | 13 | 11 | 4 | • | • | • | • | • | • | • | • | • | • | • | • | • | • | • | • | • | CH | RU | RU | RU | CH | CH | | RU | TB | | | | | | CH | RU | | DR | RU | RU |
| Detroit Lions | Central | 5 | 5 | 4 | | | CH | | | | | | | | | | | | | | | | | CH | CH | RU | | | CH | | | | | | | | | | | | |
| New York Giants | Century | 16 | 14 | 3 | RU | CH | RU | | | CH | RU | | RU | | TB | RU | | RU | | | | TB | | | | | | CH | | RU | RU | | RU | RU | RU | | | | | | |
| Baltimore Colts | Coastal | 5 | 4 | 3 | • | • | • | • | • | • | • | • | • | • | • | • | • | • | • | • | • | • | • | • | | | | | | CH | CH | | | | | RU | TB | | | CH | |
| Philadelphia Eagles | Capitol | 4 | 4 | 3 | | | | | | | | | | | | | | | RU | CH | CH | | | | | | | | | | | CH | | | | | | | | | |
| Boston / Washington Redskins | Capitol | 6 | 6 | 2 | | | | RU | CH | | | RU | | CH | RU | | RU | | | | | | | | | | | | | | | | | | | | | | | | |
| Cleveland / Los Angeles Rams | Coastal | 8 | 5 | 2 | • | • | • | • | | | | | | | • | | CH | | | | RU | RU | CH | TB | | | RU | | | | | | | | | | | | DR | | DR |
| Chicago / St. Louis Cardinals | Century | 2 | 2 | 1 | | | | | | | | | | | | | | | CH | RU | | | | | | | | | | | | | | | | | | | | | |
| Minnesota Vikings | Central | 2 | 1 | 1 | • | • | • | • | • | • | • | • | • | • | • | • | • | • | • | • | • | • | • | • | • | • | • | • | • | • | • | • | | | | | | | | DR | CH |
| Dallas Cowboys | Capitol | 4 | 2 | 0 | • | • | • | • | • | • | • | • | • | • | • | • | • | • | • | • | • | • | • | • | • | • | • | • | • | • | • | | | | | | | RU | RU | DR | DR |
| Pittsburgh Steelers | Century | 1 | 0 | 0 | | | | | | | | | | | | | | | TB | | | | | | | | | | | | | | | | | | | | | | |
| San Francisco 49ers | Coastal | 1 | 0 | 0 | • | • | • | • | • | • | • | • | • | • | • | • | • | • | • | • | • | | | | | | | | TB | | | | | | | | | | | | |

| Franchise | Division | # | CG | CH | 60 | 61 | 62 | 63 | 64 | 65 | 66 | 67 | 68 | 69 |
|---|---|---|---|---|---|---|---|---|---|---|---|---|---|---|
| Buffalo Bills | East | 4 | 3 | 2 | | | | TB | CH | CH | RU | | | |
| Dallas Texans/Kansas City Chiefs | West | 4 | 3 | 3 | | | CH | | | | CH | | TB | CH |
| Houston Oilers | East | 5 | 4 | 2 | CH | CH | RU | | | | | RU | | DR |
| Los Angeles/San Diego Chargers | West | 5 | 5 | 1 | RU | RU | | CH | RU | RU | | | | |
| Oakland Raiders | West | 3 | 3 | 1 | | | | | | | | CH | RU | RU |
| New York Jets | East | 2 | 1 | 1 | | | | | | | | | CH | DR |
| Boston Patriots | East | 1 | 1 | 0 | | | | RU | | | | | | |

KEY
| CH | NFL/AFL Champion |
| RU | Lost in NFL/AFL Championship |
| DR/TB | Lost in Divisional Round / Tiebreaker |

- Existing franchises New Orleans Saints and Atlanta Falcons (NFL) and Denver Broncos, Miami Dolphins and Cincinnati Bengals (AFL) did not make playoff appearances during this era.

== Post-merger performance by team ==
| Franchise | Division (as of 2025) | # | DR | CC | SB | CH | 66 | 67 | 68 | 69 | 70 (Note: AFL–NFL merger was formalized before the start of the 1970 season) | 71 | 72 | 73 | 74 | 75 | 76 | 77 | 78 | 79 | 80 | 81 | 82 | 83 | 84 | 85 | 86 | 87 | 88 | 89 | 90 | 91 | 92 | 93 | 94 | 95 | 96 | 97 | 98 | 99 | 00 | 01 | 02 | 03 | 04 | 05 | 06 | 07 | 08 | 09 | 10 | 11 | 12 | 13 | 14 | 15 | 16 | 17 | 18 | 19 | 20 | 21 | 22 | 23 | 24 | 25 |
|---|---|---|---|---|---|---|---|---|---|---|---|---|---|---|---|---|---|---|---|---|---|---|---|---|---|---|---|---|---|---|---|---|---|---|---|---|---|---|---|---|---|---|---|---|---|---|---|---|---|---|---|---|---|---|---|---|---|---|---|---|---|---|---|---|---|---|
| New England | AFC East | 28 | 22 | 16 | 12 | 6 | | | | | | | | | | | DR | | DR | | | | WC | | | RU | DR | | | | | | | | WC | | RU | DR | WC | | | SB | | SB | SB | DR | CC | RU | | WC | DR | RU | CC | CC | SB | CC | SB | RU | SB | WC | | WC | | | | RU |
| Pittsburgh | AFC North | 35 | 25 | 16 | 8 | 6 | | | | | | | CC | DR | SB | SB | CC | DR | SB | SB | | | WC | DR | CC | | | | | DR | | | DR | WC | CC | RU | DR | CC | | | | CC | DR | | CC | SB | | WC | SB | | RU | WC | | | WC | DR | CC | DR | | | WC | WC | | WC | WC | WC |
| San Francisco | NFC West | 29 | 27 | 19 | 8 | 5 | | | | | CC | CC | DR | | | | | | | | | SB | | CC | SB | WC | DR | DR | SB | SB | CC | | CC | CC | SB | DR | DR | CC | DR | | | WC | DR | | | | | | | | | CC | RU | CC | | | | | | RU | | CC | CC | RU | | DR |
| Dallas | NFC East | 32 | 25 | 14 | 8 | 5 | | | | | RU | SB | CC | CC | | RU | DR | SB | RU | DR | CC | CC | CC | WC | | DR | | | | | | DR | SB | SB | CC | SB | DR | | WC | WC | | | | WC | | | WC | DR | | DR | | | | | DR | | DR | | DR | | | WC | DR | WC | | |
| Kansas City | AFC West | 25 | 17 | 10 | 7 | 4 | RU | | | SB | | DR | | | | | | | | | | | | | | | WC | | | | WC | DR | WC | CC | WC | DR | | DR | | | | | | DR | | | WC | | | | WC | | | WC | | DR | DR | WC | CC | SB | RU | CC | SB | SB | RU | |
| Green Bay | NFC North | 29 | 22 | 11 | 5 | 4 | SB | SB | | | | | DR | | | | | | | | | | DR | | | | | | | | | | | DR | DR | CC | SB | RU | WC | | | DR | WC | DR | WC | | | CC | | WC | SB | DR | DR | WC | CC | DR | CC | | | CC | CC | DR | | DR | WC | WC |
| New York | NFC East | 17 | 12 | 5 | 5 | 4 | | | | | | | | | | | | | | | | DR | | | DR | DR | SB | | | DR | SB | | | DR | | | | WC | | | RU | | WC | | | WC | WC | SB | DR | | | SB | | | | | WC | | | | | | DR | | | |
| Denver | AFC West | 24 | 17 | 11 | 8 | 3 | | | | | | | | | | | | RU | DR | WC | | | | WC | DR | | RU | RU | | RU | | CC | | WC | | | DR | SB | SB | | WC | | | WC | WC | CC | | | | | | DR | DR | RU | DR | SB | | | | | | | | | WC | CC |
| Oakland / LA / LV | AFC West | 21 | 17 | 12 | 5 | 3 | | RU | | | CC | | DR | CC | CC | CC | SB | CC | | | SB | | DR | SB | WC | DR | | | | | CC | WC | | DR | | | | | | | CC | DR | RU | | | | | | | | | | | | | | WC | | | | | WC | | | | |
| Washington | NFC East | 20 | 16 | 7 | 5 | 3 | | | | | | DR | RU | DR | DR | | DR | | | | | | SB | RU | DR | | CC | SB | | | DR | SB | DR | | | | | | | DR | | | | | | DR | | WC | | | | | WC | | | WC | | | | | WC | | | | CC | |
| Los Angeles / St. Louis | NFC West | 26 | 19 | 12 | 5 | 2 | | | | | | | | DR | CC | CC | CC | DR | CC | RU | WC | | | DR | WC | CC | WC | | WC | CC | | | | | | | | | | SB | WC | RU | | DR | DR | | | | | | | | | | | | | WC | RU | | DR | SB | | WC | DR | CC |
| Philadelphia | NFC East | 28 | 16 | 9 | 5 | 2 | | | | | | | | | | | | | WC | DR | RU | WC | | | | | | | DR | WC | WC | | DR | | | DR | WC | | | | DR | CC | CC | CC | RU | | DR | | CC | WC | WC | | | WC | | | | SB | DR | WC | | WC | RU | WC | SB | WC |
| Miami | AFC East | 25 | 17 | 7 | 5 | 2 | | | | | DR | RU | SB | SB | DR | | | | WC | DR | | DR | RU | DR | RU | CC | | | | | DR | | CC | | DR | WC | | WC | DR | DR | DR | WC | | | | | | | WC | | | | | | | | WC | | | | | | WC | WC | | |
| Baltimore / Indianapolis | AFC South | 25 | 18 | 8 | 4 | 2 | | | RU | | SB | CC | | | | DR | DR | DR | | | | | | | | | | DR | | | | | | | | CC | WC | | | DR | WC | | WC | CC | DR | DR | SB | DR | WC | RU | WC | | WC | DR | CC | | | | DR | | WC | | | | | |
| Baltimore | AFC North | 16 | 13 | 5 | 2 | 2 | • | • | • | • | • | • | • | • | • | • | • | • | • | • | • | • | • | • | • | • | • | • | • | • | • | • | • | • | • | • | | | | | SB | DR | | WC | | | DR | | CC | DR | DR | CC | SB | | DR | | | | WC | DR | DR | | WC | CC | DR | |
| Tampa Bay | NFC South | 15 | 8 | 4 | 2 | 2 | • | • | • | • | • | • | • | • | • | • | | | | CC | | DR | WC | | | | | | | | | | | | | | | DR | | CC | WC | WC | SB | | | WC | | WC | | | | | | | | | | | | | SB | DR | WC | DR | WC | |
| Seattle | NFC West | 21 | 14 | 5 | 4 | 2 | • | • | • | • | • | • | • | • | • | • | | | | | | | | CC | DR | | | WC | DR | | | | | | | | | | | WC | | | | WC | WC | RU | DR | DR | | | DR | | DR | SB | RU | DR | DR | | WC | DR | WC | | WC | | | SB |
| Chicago | NFC North | 17 | 13 | 5 | 2 | 1 | | | | | | | | | | | | DR | | WC | | | | | CC | SB | DR | DR | CC | | DR | WC | | | DR | | | | | | | DR | | | | DR | RU | | | | CC | | | | | | | | WC | | WC | | | | | DR |
| New York | AFC East | 13 | 9 | 5 | 1 | 1 | | | SB | | | | | | | | | | | | | WC | CC | | | WC | DR | | | | | WC | | | | | | | CC | | | WC | DR | | DR | | WC | | | CC | CC | | | | | | | | | | | | | | | |
| New Orleans | NFC South | 14 | 8 | 3 | 1 | 1 | | | | | | | | | | | | | | | | | | | | | | WC | | | WC | WC | WC | | | | | | | | DR | | | | | | CC | | | SB | WC | DR | | DR | | | | DR | CC | WC | DR | | | | | |
| Minnesota | NFC North | 31 | 22 | 10 | 4 | 0 | | | | RU | DR | DR | | RU | RU | DR | RU | CC | DR | | DR | | DR | | | | | CC | DR | DR | | | WC | WC | WC | | WC | DR | CC | DR | CC | | | | DR | | | | WC | CC | | | WC | | | WC | | CC | | DR | | | WC | WC | | |
| Buffalo | AFC East | 21 | 16 | 7 | 4 | 0 | | | | | | | | | DR | | | | | | DR | DR | | | | | | | CC | DR | RU | RU | RU | RU | | DR | WC | | WC | WC | | | | | | | | | | | | | | | | | | WC | | WC | CC | DR | DR | DR | CC | DR |
| Cincinnati | AFC North | 16 | 8 | 4 | 3 | 0 | • | • | | | DR | | | DR | | DR | | | | | | RU | WC | | | | | | RU | | DR | | | | | | | | | | | | | | | WC | | | | WC | | WC | WC | WC | WC | WC | | | | | | RU | CC | | | |
| Atlanta | NFC South | 14 | 10 | 4 | 2 | 0 | | | | | | | | | | | | | DR | | DR | | WC | | | | | | | | | DR | | | | WC | | | RU | | | | DR | | CC | | | | WC | | DR | WC | CC | | | | RU | DR | | | | | | | | |
| Carolina | NFC South | 9 | 7 | 4 | 2 | 0 | • | • | • | • | • | • | • | • | • | • | • | • | • | • | • | • | • | • | • | • | • | • | • | • | • | • | • | • | • | | CC | | | | | | | RU | | CC | | | DR | | | | | DR | DR | RU | | WC | | | | | | | | WC |
| Houston / Tennessee | AFC South | 20 | 14 | 5 | 1 | 0 | | | | | | | | | | | | | CC | CC | WC | | | | | | | DR | DR | WC | WC | DR | WC | DR | | | | | | RU | DR | | CC | DR | | | | WC | DR | | | | | | | | | DR | | CC | WC | DR | | | | |
| San Diego / Los Angeles | AFC West | 17 | 12 | 4 | 1 | 0 | | | | | | | | | | | | | | DR | CC | CC | DR | | | | | | | | | | DR | | RU | WC | | | | | | | | | WC | | DR | CC | DR | DR | | | | DR | | | | | DR | | | | WC | | WC | WC |
| St. Louis / Arizona | NFC West | 9 | 6 | 2 | 1 | 0 | | | | | | | | | DR | DR | | | | | | | WC | | | | | | | | | | | | | | | | DR | | | | | | | | | | RU | DR | | | | | WC | CC | | | | | | WC | | | | |
| Cleveland | AFC North | 13 | 9 | 3 | 0 | 0 | | | | | | DR | DR | | | | | | | | DR | | WC | | | DR | CC | CC | WC | CC | | | | | DR | | • | • | • | | | | WC | | | | | | | | | | | | | | | | | | DR | | | WC | | |
| Jacksonville | AFC South | 9 | 6 | 3 | 0 | 0 | • | • | • | • | • | • | • | • | • | • | • | • | • | • | • | • | • | • | • | • | • | • | • | • | • | • | • | • | • | | CC | WC | DR | CC | | | | | | WC | | DR | | | | | | | | | | CC | | | | | DR | | | WC |
| Detroit | NFC North | 14 | 5 | 2 | 0 | 0 | | | | | DR | | | | | | | | | | | | WC | DR | | | | | | | | CC | | WC | WC | WC | | WC | | WC | | | | | | | | | | | | WC | | | WC | | WC | | | | | | | CC | DR | |
| Houston | AFC South | 9 | 7 | 0 | 0 | 0 | • | • | • | • | • | • | • | • | • | • | • | • | • | • | • | • | • | • | • | • | • | • | • | • | • | • | • | • | • | • | • | • | • | • | • | • | | | | | | | | | | DR | DR | | | WC | DR | | WC | DR | | | | DR | DR | DR |

KEY
| SB | Super Bowl Champion |
| RU | Lost in Super Bowl |
| CC | Lost in Conference Championship |
| DR | Lost in Divisional Round |
| WC | Lost in Wild Card |
