= NFL playoffs =

US National Football League playoff games

- Current season, competition or edition: 2025–26 NFL playoffs
- Sport: American football
- Founded: 1933
- No. of teams: 14
- Most recent champions: Seattle Seahawks (2 titles)
- Most titles: Green Bay Packers (13 titles) (Note: Green Bay Packers have a total of 13 NFL championships: Pre-Playoffs Era (1920–1932): 3 Playoffs pre-Super Bowl Era (1933–1965): 6 Super Bowl Era (1966–present): 4)
- Broadcasters: United States: CBS; Fox; NBC; ABC/ESPN/ESPN2; U.S. Spanish audio broadcasts: Telemundo/Universo; ESPN Deportes; Fox Deportes; International: See list
- Streaming partners: United States: Paramount+; Peacock; ESPN+/ESPN DTC; Amazon; Fox One; International: DAZN

The National Football League (NFL) playoffs is the annual single-elimination tournament held to determine the league champion. The four-round tournament is held after the league's regular season. Since the 2020 season, seven teams from each of the league's two conferences qualify for the playoffs based on regular season winning percentage, with a tie-breaking procedure if required. The top team in each conference receives a first-round bye, automatically advancing to the next round. The tournament culminates in the Super Bowl, the league's championship game, competed between teams from each conference. Among the four major professional sports leagues in the United States, the NFL postseason is the only one to use a single-elimination tournament in all of its rounds.

NFL postseason history can be traced to the first NFL Championship Game in 1933, though in the early years, qualification for the game was based solely on regular-season records. From 1933 to 1966, the NFL postseason generally only consisted of the NFL Championship Game, which pitted the league's two division winners against each other (pending any one-game playoff matches that needed to be held to break ties in the division standings). In 1967, the playoffs were expanded to four teams (division winners). When the league completed its merger with the American Football League (AFL) in 1970, the playoffs were expanded to eight teams, which increased to ten in 1978, sixteen in 1982 (which was caused by a shortened season due to 1982 NFL strike), back to ten in 1983, twelve in 1990, and fourteen in 2020.

== Format ==
Schedule for the NFL playoffs
Season	2024–25	2025–26	2026–27	2027–28 (tentative)
Wild-card	Jan 11–13	Jan 10–12	Jan 16–18	Jan 15–17
Divisional	Jan 18–19	Jan 17–18	Jan 23–24	Jan 22–23
Conference	Jan 26	Jan 25	Jan 31	Jan 30
Super Bowl	LIX; Feb 9	LX; Feb 8	LXI; Feb 14	LXII; Feb 13

The 32-team National Football League is divided into two conferences, the American Football Conference (AFC) and the National Football Conference (NFC). Since 2002, each conference has 16 teams and is further divided into four geographic divisions of four teams each. As of 2025, qualification into the playoffs works as follows:

- The four division champions from each conference (the team in each division with the best overall record) are seeded 1 through 4 based on their overall won-lost-tied record.
- Three wild-card qualifiers from each conference (the three teams with the best overall record of all remaining teams in the conference) are seeded 5, 6, and 7.

If teams are tied (having the same regular season won-lost-tied record), the playoff seeding is determined by a set of tie-breaking rules.

The names of the first two playoff rounds date back to the postseason format that was first used in 1978, when the league added a second wild-card team to each conference. The first round of the playoffs is dubbed the "wild card round", "wild card weekend", or, from 2020–21 to 2023–24, "super wild card weekend". In this round, the second-seeded division winner hosts the seventh-seeded wild card team, the third hosts the sixth, and the fourth hosts the fifth. There are no restrictions regarding teams from the same division matching up in any round. The team with the best overall record from each conference receives a first round bye, automatically advancing them to the second round, dubbed the "divisional round", and hosts the lowest-remaining seed from the wild-card round. Meanwhile, the other two winners from that round play each other with the higher seeds hosting. The two surviving teams from each conferences' divisional round playoff games then meet in the respective conference championship games for the AFC and NFC, hosted by the higher-seeded team. The winners of those contests go on to face one another in the Super Bowl which is played at a predetermined site.

The New York Giants and New York Jets have shared the same home stadium since 1984 (Giants Stadium from 1984 to 2009, and MetLife Stadium since 2010). Thus, if both teams need to host playoff games on the same weekend, they are required to play on different days, even during the conference championship round when both games are normally scheduled on the same day. The only time such a scheduling conflict occurred was during Wild Card weekend in 1985 when only 10 teams qualified for the postseason and there were only two wild-card games. The 10-team system was used from 1978 to 1989 excluding 1982 (the 1982 NFL season used a 16-team playoff format). Instead of playing both Wild Card games on the same day, the Jets hosted their game on Saturday, December 28, before the Giants hosted their game on Sunday, December 29. This same scheduling conflict could occur for the Los Angeles Chargers and Los Angeles Rams, who began sharing SoFi Stadium in 2020.

#3 seed hosts	2nd-highestseed hosts
6	Wild-card #2
3	Division winner #3
2nd-lowest remaining seed
Higher seed hosts
#2 seed hosts	2nd-highest remaining seed
See Reseeding below
7	Wild-card #3	Lower seed
#1 seed hosts
2	Division winner #2	Higher seed
AFC Championship
#4 seed hosts	Lowest remaining seed
1	AFC best record
5	Wild-card #1
Divisional playoffs	Neutral site
4	Division winner #4
Wild-card round
A	AFC champion
#3 seed hosts	2nd-highestseed hosts	N	NFC champion
Super Bowl
6	Wild-card #2
3	Division winner #3
2nd-lowest remaining seed
Higher seed hosts
#2 seed hosts	2nd-highest remaining seed
See Reseeding below
7	Wild-card #3	Lower seed
#1 seed hosts
2	Division winner #2	Higher seed
NFC Championship
#4 seed hosts	Lowest remaining seed
1	NFC best record
5	Wild-card #1
4	Division winner #4

- Reseeding: Home field is determined by seeding number, not position on the bracket. The NFL does not use a fixed bracket system; the outcomes of the Wild Card games determine the matchups of the Divisional playoffs games. The lowest remaining seed in each conference travels to the first seed, and the second-lowest remaining seed travels to the second-highest remaining seed.

== Breaking ties ==
Often, teams will finish a season with identical records. It therefore becomes necessary to devise means to break these ties, either to determine which teams will qualify for the playoffs or to determine seeding in the playoff tournament. The rules below are applied in order until the tie is broken. Ties within divisions are always broken first to eliminate all but the highest-ranked club in each division before breaking ties between teams in different divisions; however, it should be emphasized that other than for division winners, divisional ranking is not in itself a tiebreaker. For example, if a division runner-up ties with teams finishing third and fourth in another division, the runner-up's record will be compared to the team awarded third place in the other division without regard to the teams' divisional finish.

If three or four teams in one division are tied for the division title and/or division runner-up, and also if after breaking ties within divisions three or four teams in different divisions are tied, then should the one or two team(s) be qualified or eliminated at any step the tiebreaker reverts to step one for the remaining two or three teams. If multiple playoff spots are at stake, the rules are applied in order until the first team(s) qualify(ies) or are eliminated, then the process is started again for the remaining teams. Finally, once ties are broken between three or more teams qualifying for the playoffs, the relative positions of the seeds determined will not change regardless of wild card and divisional round results – for example, if division winners were to tie for the second, third and fourth seeds in a conference and the third and fourth seeds subsequently advanced to the conference championship game, the team that was originally awarded the third seed would host that game even if it lost a head-to-head tiebreaker against the fourth seed.

The tie-breaking rules have changed over the years, with the most recent changes being made in 2002 to accommodate the league's realignment into eight four-team divisions; record vs. common opponents and most of the other criteria involving wins and losses were moved up higher in the tie-breaking list, while those involving compiled stats such as points for and against were moved to the bottom.

The current tiebreakers are as follows, with coin tosses or drawing of lots used if all of the criteria fail:

Divisional tiebreakers	Conference tiebreakers
1. Head-to-head (best won-lost-tied percentage in games between the clubs).; 2. Best won-lost-tied percentage in games played within the division.; 3. Best won-lost-tied percentage in common games (games played against the same opponents).; 4. Best won-lost-tied percentage in games played within the conference.; 5. Strength of victory (the combined won-lost-tied percentage of all the teams that a club has defeated).; 6. Strength of schedule (the combined won-lost-tied percentage of all the teams that a club has played against).; 7. Best combined ranking among conference teams in points scored and points allowed.; 8. Best combined ranking among all teams in points scored and points allowed.; 9. Best net points in common games.; 10. Best net points in all games.; 11. Best net touchdowns in all games.	1. Apply division tiebreaker to eliminate all but the highest-ranked club in each division before proceeding to step 2.; 2. Head-to-head, if applicable. (For ties among three or more teams, this step is only applied if there is a head-to-head sweep; i.e., if one club has defeated each of the others or if one club has lost to each of the others.); 3. Best won-lost-tied percentage in games played within the conference.; 4. Best won-lost-tied percentage in common games, a minimum of four.; 5. Strength of victory (record of all the teams they defeated that season).; 6. Strength of schedule (record of all the teams they played that season).; 7. Best combined ranking among conference teams in points scored and points allowed.; 8. Best combined ranking among all teams in points scored and points allowed.; 9. Best net points in conference games.; 10. Best net points in all games.; 11. Best net touchdowns in all games.

== Overtime rules ==
The NFL introduced overtime for any divisional tiebreaker games beginning in 1940 and for championship games beginning in 1946. The first postseason game to be played under these rules was the 1958 NFL Championship Game between the Baltimore Colts and New York Giants (the so-called "Greatest Game Ever Played"), decided by a one-yard touchdown run by Colts fullback Alan Ameche after eight minutes and fifteen seconds of extra time. Overtime under the original format was sudden death, the first team to score would be declared the winner.

In March 2010, the NFL amended its rules for postseason overtime, with the rule being extended into the regular season in March 2012. If a team scores a touchdown, or if the defense scores a safety on the (other team's) first possession, it is declared the winner. If it scores a field goal on its first possession, however, it then kicks off to the opposing team, which has an opportunity to score; if the score is tied again after that possession, true sudden death rules apply and whoever scores next will win. True sudden death rules would continue from double overtime hereafter.

The league further amended its postseason overtime rules in March 2022, with the rule being extended into the regular season in April 2025. It allows both teams to have at least one possession even if the first team with possession scores a touchdown.

=== Multiple overtimes ===
Since postseason games cannot end in a tie, unlike the preseason or regular season, additional overtime periods are played as necessary until a winner is determined. Furthermore, all clock rules apply as if a game had started over. Therefore, if the first overtime period ends with the score still tied, the teams switch ends of the field before the second overtime. With two minutes to go in the second overtime, there would be a two-minute warning (but not during the first overtime period as in the regular season). If it were still tied at the end of the second overtime, the team that lost (or deferred) the coin toss before the first overtime would have the option to kick off, receive, or choose a side of the field to defend. However, unlike in the first overtime period, true sudden death rules would continue from the start of any third and subsequent overtime period. There would be no extended break in between the second and third overtimes like at halftime of a regulation game, only the usual break in between quarters. If a game reached a fifth overtime, another coin toss would be held and timing rules would be as if another game started over. Although a contest could theoretically last indefinitely, or last several overtime periods like several National Hockey League postseason games, no NFL playoff game has ever gone past two overtime periods. The longest NFL overtime game played to date is 82 minutes, 40 seconds: Miami Dolphins kicker Garo Yepremian made the walk-off 37-yard field goal after 7:40 of the second overtime to defeat the Kansas City Chiefs, 27–24, in an AFC playoff game on December 25, 1971.

Playoff games that went into at least two overtimes
Length of game	Date	Away team	Score	Home team	Winning score
82:40	December 25, 1971	Miami Dolphins	27–24	Kansas City Chiefs	Garo Yepremian 37-yard field goal
77:54†	December 23, 1962	Dallas Texans	20–17	Houston Oilers	Tommy Brooker 25-yard field goal
77:02	January 3, 1987	New York Jets	20–23	Cleveland Browns	Mark Moseley 27-yard field goal
76:42	January 12, 2013	Baltimore Ravens	38–35	Denver Broncos	Justin Tucker 47-yard field goal
75:43	December 24, 1977	Oakland Raiders	37–31	Baltimore Colts	Dave Casper 10-yard touchdown pass from Ken Stabler
75:10	January 10, 2004	Carolina Panthers	29–23	St. Louis Rams	Steve Smith 69-yard touchdown pass from Jake Delhomme
† AFL game prior to the AFL–NFL merger.

== Playoff and championship history ==
The NFL's method for determining its champions has changed over the years.

=== Early years ===
From the league's founding in 1920 until 1932, there was no scheduled championship game. From 1920 to 1923, the championship was awarded to a team by a vote of team owners at the annual owners' meeting. From 1924 to 1932, the team having the best winning percentage was awarded the championship (the de facto standard owners had been using anyway). As each team played a different number of games, simply counting wins and losses would have been insufficient. Additionally, tie games were not counted in the standings in figuring winning percentage (under modern rules, ties count as ½ win and ½ loss). There was a head-to-head tiebreaker, which also was weighted toward the end of the season: for two teams that played each other twice, each winning once, the team winning the second game was determined to be the champion (the criteria used to decide the 1921 title).

=== 1932 playoff game ===
In 1932, the Chicago Bears (6–1–6) and the Portsmouth Spartans (6–1–4) were tied at the end of the season with identical winning percentages (.857). Of note, the Green Bay Packers (10–3–1) had more wins, but a lower winning percentage (.769) as calculated under the rules of the day, which ignored ties.

The Bears and Spartans had played to ties in both of their matchups, so the head-to-head tiebreaker did not apply. An additional game was therefore needed to determine a champion. It was agreed that the game would be played at Chicago's Wrigley Field, but severe winter weather and fear of a low turnout forced the game to be moved indoors to Chicago Stadium.

The game was played under modified rules on a shortened 80-yard dirt field, and the Bears won with a final score of 9–0. As a result of the game, the Bears had the better winning percentage (.875) and won the league title. The loss gave the Spartans a final winning percentage of .750 and moved them to third place behind the Packers. While there is no consensus that this game was a real "championship" game (or even a playoff game), it generated considerable interest and led to the creation of the official NFL Championship Game in 1933.

=== Before the Super Bowl ===
Given the interest of the impromptu "championship game", and the desire of the league to create a more equitable means of determining a champion, the league divided into two conferences beginning in 1933. The first-place teams in each conference met in the NFL Championship Game after the season. There was no tie-breaker system in place; any ties in the final standings of either conference resulted in playoff games in 1941, 1943, 1947, 1950 (2), 1952, 1957, 1958, and 1965. Since the venue and date of the championship game were often not known until the last game of the season had been played, these playoff games sometimes delayed the NFL title game by a week.

The playoff structure used from 1933 to 1966 was considered inequitable by some because of the number of times it failed to match the teams with the two best records in the championship game, as only the conference winners would qualify for playoff contention. Four times between 1950 and 1966 (in 1951, 1956, 1960, and 1963) the team with the second-best win–loss record did not qualify for the playoffs while the team with the best record in the other conference, but only the third-best in the league, advanced to the championship game.

During the 1960s, a third-place game was held in Miami, called the Playoff Bowl. It was contested in early January following the 1960–69 seasons. Though official playoff games at the time they were played, the NFL now officially classifies these ten games (and statistics) as exhibitions, not as playoff games.

==== AAFC playoffs ====
During its brief history, the AAFC, which would merge into the NFL for the 1950 season, used an identical playoff format to the NFL from 1946 to 1948. In 1949 (its last year), the AAFC merged its two conferences when one of its teams folded, and used a four-team playoff system. In 1948, the aforementioned issue of playoff inequity came into play when the San Francisco 49ers would miss the playoffs with a 12–2 record; they were in the same conference as the 14–0 Cleveland Browns, who would go on to win the Western Conference and then the AAFC's championship game against the 7–7 Buffalo Bills (AAFC).

==== AFL playoffs ====
For the 1960–68 seasons, the AFL used the two-divisional format identical to the NFL to determine its champion. There was no tie-breaker system in place, so ties atop the Eastern Division final standings in 1963 and Western Division in 1968 necessitated playoff games to determine each division's representative in the championship. In both years, the playoff winner went on the road for the AFL title game and lost.

For 1969, the final season before its merger with the NFL, the AFL added a first-round whereby each division winner played the second-place team from the other division. The winners of these games met in the AFL Championship Game. In the only year of this format, the AFL champion Kansas City Chiefs were the second-place team in the Western division and played both games on the road. They won Super Bowl IV in January and became the first division runner-up to win a Super Bowl.

=== Super Bowl and merger ===
The Super Bowl began as an inter-league championship game between the AFL and NFL, an idea first proposed by Kansas City Chiefs owner Lamar Hunt. This compromise was the result of pressures the upstart AFL was placing on the older NFL. The success of the rival league eventually led to a full merger of the two leagues. From the 1966 season to the 1969 season (Super Bowls I–IV) the game featured the champions of the AFL and NFL.

In 1967, the NFL expanded to 16 teams and split its two conferences into two divisions of four teams each. The four division champions advanced to the league's first guaranteed multi–game playoffs. To remain on schedule, a tie-breaker system was introduced. The first round determined the conference's champion and its representative in the NFL Championship Game, played the following week.

During the three years (1967–69) that this playoff structure was in effect, there was one use of the tie-breaker system. In 1967, the Los Angeles Rams and Baltimore Colts ended the season tied at 11–1–2 for the lead in the Coastal Division. The Colts came into the last game of the season undefeated but were beaten by the Rams. Though the Colts shared the best win–loss record in the NFL that year, they failed to advance to the playoffs while three other teams with worse records won their divisions. This event figured into the decision in 1970 to include a wild-card team in the playoff tournament after the AFL–NFL merger.

When the leagues merged in 1970, the new NFL (with 26 teams) reorganized into two conferences—the National Football Conference (NFC) and the American Football Conference (AFC)—with three divisions each. From the 1970 season to the 1977 season, four teams from each conference (for a total of eight teams) qualified for the playoffs each year. These four teams included the three division champions, and a fourth wild-card team.

Originally, the home teams in the playoffs were decided based on a yearly rotation. From 1970 to 1974, the divisional playoff round rotated which of the three division champions would have home-field advantage, with the wild-card team never having it; they and their opponents they faced in the divisional playoff game do not get home field advantage in the conference championship game. Starting in 1970, the divisional playoff games consisted of the AFC Central champions and the NFC West champions playing their games on the road. Then in 1971, it rotated to the AFC East champions and the NFC East champions playing their games on the road. In the 1972 divisional playoff games, the AFC West champions and the NFC Central champions were the visiting teams. And in 1973 it would start all over with the AFC Central and NFC West again, and again in 1974 with the AFC East champions and the NFC East champions playing their games on the road.

The divisional playoff match-ups were pre-determined year by year. The designated division champion assigned to play on the road would travel to play the division champion from the same division as the wild card winner. The wild card team was only allowed to play their divisional rival in the conference championship, but not in the divisional playoffs. In some years the designated road team was from the same division as the wild card team. In that case, the designated divisional road team would play one of the two other division champions, depending on the probable matchups from the previous year. For example, in the 1971 divisional playoffs, the AFC Eastern division winner was assigned to play on the road. The reason they played the AFC Western division champion and not the Central division, is because the AFC Eastern division winner played host to the AFC Central division winner in the divisional playoffs from the previous year (1970). This idea was designed to rotate playoff matchups year by year and not repeat.

However, the rotation system led to several playoff inequities, such as:

- In 1971, the teams with the two best records in each conference met in the divisional round. Meanwhile, the wild card teams had better records than the division winners they faced (the Browns and 49ers were both 9–5).
- In 1972, the Dolphins had to take their perfect record to Three Rivers Stadium to face the Pittsburgh Steelers, who went 11–3, in the AFC championship game. Also, the 8–5–1 49ers, who had the worst record of any playoff team, hosted the 10–4 Cowboys.
- In 1973, the 10–4 Bengals had to play at the 12–2 Dolphins in the divisional round, while the 9–4–1 Raiders hosted the 10–4 wild card Steelers.
- That same year, the Cowboys finished 10–4, but hosted two 12–2 teams; the Los Angeles Rams and Minnesota.
- In 1974, the 11–3 Dolphins had to play at the 12–2 Raiders in the divisional round, while the 10–3–1 Steelers hosted the wild card Bills.
- In 1974, the Vikings hosted the Rams in the NFC championship even though both teams went 10–4 and Los Angeles defeated Minnesota in the regular season.

The league instituted a seeding system for the playoffs in 1975, where the surviving clubs with the higher seeds were made the home teams for each playoff round. Thus, the top-seeded division winner played the wild-card team, and the remaining two division winners played at the home stadium of the better seed, forcing the lowest-ranked division winner to open the postseason on the road. However, two teams from the same division could not meet before the conference championship game. Thus, there would be times when the pairing in the divisional playoff round would be the 1 seed vs. the 3 seed and 2 vs. 4.

=== Expansion ===
Following an expansion of the regular season from 14 to 16 games in 1978, the league added one more wild-card team for each conference. The two wild-card teams played the week before the division winners. The winner of this game would be normally assigned to play the top-seeded division winner. However, the league continued to prohibit intra-divisional games in the divisional playoffs as was the case from 1970 to 1977, but allowed such contests in the wild-card round. This ten-team playoff format was used through the 1989 season. Under this system, the Oakland Raiders became the first wild-card team to win a Super Bowl following the 1980 season, and the first team to win a Super Bowl by winning four playoff games.

During the strike-shortened 1982 season, only nine regular-season games were played, and a modified playoff format was instituted. Divisional play was ignored (there were some cases where division rivals had both games wiped out by the strike, although each division ultimately sent at least one team to the playoffs), and the top eight teams from each conference (based on W-L-T record) were advanced to the playoffs. As a result, this became the first time that teams with losing records qualified for the playoffs: the 4–5 Cleveland Browns and the 4–5 Detroit Lions.

Several times between 1978 and 1989, the two wild-card games had to be played on different days. Normally they both would be held on Sunday. In 1983 and 1988, the games were split between Saturday and Monday because Sunday was Christmas, and the NFL had avoided playing on that day at the time. In 1984, both games were played in the Pacific Time Zone, so they had to be played on Saturday and Sunday to accommodate for time differences. In 1985, both the New York Giants and Jets hosted wild-card games. As they have shared a home stadium since 1984, the games had to be played on different days.

For the 1990 season, a third wild-card team for each conference was added, expanding the playoffs to twelve teams. The lowest-seeded division winner was then "demoted" to the wild-card weekend as the home team. Also, the restrictions on intra-divisional games during the divisional playoffs were removed.

The 2001 season was the first with playoff games in prime time. Thus, the league no longer had the same restrictions like in 1984 as to when to schedule games in the Pacific Time Zone.

The 1990 format continued until the 2002 expansion and realignment into eight divisions. In this format, used until the 2019 season, the four division winners and two wild cards in both conferences are seeded 1–6, respectively, with the top two seeds receiving byes, and the highest seed in each round guaranteed to host the lowest seed.

A limitation of the 12–team format was that division winners, including one with a .500 regular season record or a losing season, could play a home playoff game against wild card teams who had superior regular season records. Home field advantage does not guarantee success, however; during the 2015–16 season, every road team won their respective Wild Card playoff game, the first such occurrence in NFL history. Through 2019 however, NFL owners remained adamant that every division winner should still be rewarded with a home playoff game regardless of record.

Calls to expand the playoffs to 14 teams began in 2006. Proponents of expansion noted the increased revenue that could be gained from an additional two playoff games. They also noted that the 12–team playoff system was implemented when the league still had 28 teams, four fewer than the 2002 expansion. The opposition to such a move notes that an expansion of the playoffs would "water down" the field by giving access to lower-caliber teams. Opponents of expansion further point to the NBA playoffs and the NHL playoffs where more than half of the teams qualify for the postseason, and there is often a decreased emphasis on regular season performance as a result. In October 2013, NFL commissioner Roger Goodell announced plans to revisit the idea to expand the playoffs to 14 teams, with the increased revenue gained from the two additional postseason games being used to offset plans to shorten the preseason. The 14–team playoff proposal remained tabled until December 2014, when no team in the NFC South could finish better than .500; Goodell stated that the league would vote on it at the March 2015 Owners' Meetings. However, by February 2015, the Washington Post reported that support among team owners had eroded, and league leaders expressed reluctance to make a change until the end of the 2015 season. The proposal then lost all interest by 2017.

The league eventually revisited and implemented the 14–team playoff format in 2020, placing a third wild-card team in each conference, and only giving the top seed a bye (as explained above). For the first four years of this expanded playoff format, the league branded the opening round as "Super Wild Card Weekend" to help differentiate it from the previous 12–team format.

== NFL playoff appearances ==
Correct as of the end of the 2025 regular season (including 2025–26 NFL playoffs berths).

=== Appearances by active teams ===
Team	Appearances
Green Bay Packers	38
Dallas Cowboys	36
Pittsburgh Steelers	36
Cleveland / St. Louis / Los Angeles Rams	34
New York Giants	33
Minnesota Vikings	32
Philadelphia Eagles	32
San Francisco 49ers	31 (Note: The NFL now officially recognizes the team's playoff appearances and records from 1946 to 1949 when they were part of the All-America Football Conference.)
Cleveland Browns	30 (Note: The Baltimore Ravens were originally the Cleveland Browns, and moved to Baltimore in 1996. Due to an agreement with the city of Cleveland that allowed the club to move, the Browns' name, colors, and team history/records were left for a new Cleveland Browns team while the team, personnel, and staff of the old Browns team were allowed to move to Baltimore. As such, the Ravens are considered to have begun play in 1996 while the current Cleveland Browns are considered to have joined the NFL in 1950, were inactive from 1996 to 1998, and resumed play as a new team in 1999.)
Baltimore / Indianapolis Colts	29
Boston / New England Patriots	29 (Note: Includes American Football League postseason appearances. Per the conditions of the AFL–NFL merger, all history, playoffs, and records of the AFL were incorporated into the NFL.)
Chicago Bears	28 (Note: Does not include the appearance in the 1932 NFL Playoff Game. The NFL officially records it as an additional regular-season game)
Kansas City Chiefs	27
Washington Redskins / Football Team / Commanders	26
Buffalo Bills	25
Houston Oilers / Tennessee Titans	25
Miami Dolphins	25
Denver Broncos	24
Oakland / Los Angeles / Las Vegas Raiders	23
San Diego / Los Angeles Chargers	22
Seattle Seahawks	21
Detroit Lions	20
Baltimore Ravens	16
Cincinnati Bengals	16
Tampa Bay Buccaneers	15
Atlanta Falcons	14
New Orleans Saints	14
New York Jets	14
Chicago / St. Louis / Arizona Cardinals	11
Carolina Panthers	9
Houston Texans	9
Jacksonville Jaguars	9

== Current playoff appearance streaks ==
- Bold italics including longest streak indicates that the streak is also the team's longest-ever streak for consecutive playoff seasons.

Current consecutive Playoff appearances
Seasons	2018	2019	2020	2021	2022	2023	2024	2025	2026
	7	Buffalo Bills' longest streak							
			5	Philadelphia Eagles' longest streak (tied)					
					3	Pittsburgh Steelers			
					3	Houston Texans' longest streak			
					3	Los Angeles Rams			
					3	Green Bay Packers			
						2	LA Chargers		
						2	Denver Broncos		
Seasons	2018	2019	2020	2021	2022	2023	2024	2025	2026

=== Breakdown by division ===
2025 season
Division	Team	Seasons
AFC East	Buffalo Bills	7
AFC East	New England Patriots	1
AFC North	Pittsburgh Steelers	3
AFC South	Houston Texans	3
AFC South	Jacksonville Jaguars	1
AFC West	Los Angeles Chargers	2
AFC West	Denver Broncos	2
NFC East	Philadelphia Eagles	5
NFC North	Green Bay Packers	3
NFC North	Chicago Bears	1
NFC South	Carolina Panthers	1
NFC West	Los Angeles Rams	3
NFC West	San Francisco 49ers	1
NFC West	Seattle Seahawks	1

== All-time streaks of accomplishment ==
Notable current streaks in the table are listed below in bold. Only the longest streak for each team is listed. Note that the regular season increased from 14 to 16 games in 1978, then to the current 17 in 2021, and teams only played 9 regular-season games in 1982.

All streaks can be verified on the team pages at Pro-Football-Reference.com.

=== Most consecutive playoff appearances all time ===
Streaks can be verified at Pro Football Reference.com Team Franchise Pages

Italics= Streak is ongoing as of 2025 NFL season.

Streak Length	Teams
11	Patriots
10	Chiefs
9	Cowboys · Colts
8	49ers · Packers · Rams · Steelers
7	Oilers (Titans) · Bills
6	Browns · Raiders · Vikings
5	Dolphins (x3) · Seahawks (x2) · Bears · Bengals · Broncos · Eagles (x2) · Ravens · Buccaneers
4	Chargers · Giants · Jaguars · Redskins (Commanders) · Saints
3	Lions (x2) · Falcons · Panthers · Texans
2	Jets (x5) · Cardinals (x4)

Timeline for each team's longest streak.

Teams' longest consecutive playoff appearances all time
1940s					1950s							1960s			1970s										1980s										1990s					
5	6	7	8	9	0	1	2	3	4	5	6	7	8	9	0	1	2	3	4	5	6	7	8	9	0	1	2	3	4	5	6	7	8	9	0	1	2	3	4	5
		Chi. Cards 2					Detroit Lions 3						NY Jets 2						St. L. Cards 2							NY Jets 2				NY Jets 2			Buffalo Bills 6							
					Cleveland Browns 6											Washington Redskins 4				Dallas Cowboys 9												Houston Oilers 7								
																	Pittsburgh Steelers 8																							
																		Los Angeles Rams 8										San Francisco 49ers 8												
																	Oakland Raiders 6																							
																		Minnesota Vikings 6						S. D. Chargers 4					Chicago Bears 5									Detroit Lions 3		
															Miami Dolphins 5											Miami Dolphins 5														

**Bold and light blue is an Active Streak**

Teams' longest consecutive playoff appearances all time
1990s				2000s										2010s										2020s					
6	7	8	9	0	1	2	3	4	5	6	7	8	9	0	1	2	3	4	5	6	7	8	9	0	1	2	3	4	5
						Indianapolis Colts 9									Cincinnati Bengals 5														
Jacksonville Jaguars 4				Philadelphia Eagles 5					New York Giants 4				Green Bay Packers 8																
													New England Patriots 11											**Tampa Bay Bucs 5**					
										San Diego Chargers 4									**Kansas City Chiefs 10**										
	Miami Dolphins 5											Baltimore Ravens 5					Carolina Panthers 3												
					NY Jets 2								NY Jets 2		Denver Broncos 5								**Buffalo Bills 6**						
												Arizona Cards 2		Atlanta Falcons 3				Arizona Cards 2											
							Seattle Seahawks 5									Seattle Seahawks 5					New Orleans Saints 4								
															Houston Texans 2				Houston Texans 2			Houston Texans 2					**Houston Texans 2**		

=== Longest consecutive streak with a playoff win ===
Streaks can be verified at Pro Football Reference.com Team Franchise Pages

Streak Length	Teams
8	Patriots
7	Chiefs
6	Cowboys
5	Eagles · Packers · Raiders · Ravens · Seahawks · Bills
4	Steelers · Vikings
3	49ers (x 4) · Chargers · Dolphins (x 2) · Giants · Rams · Washington
2	Bears (x 2) · Bengals · Broncos (x 2) · Browns (x 3) · Buccaneers · Cardinals · Colts (x 4) · Falcons · Jaguars · Jets · Lions · Panthers · Saints · Texans (x 2) · Titans (Oilers) (x 4)

Timeline for each team's longest streak.

Teams' longest consecutive seasons with a playoff win all time (minimum 2 seasons)
1940s		1950s								1960s										1970s									
0	1	2	3	4	5	6	7	8	9	0	1	2	3	4	5	6	7	8	9	0	1	2	3	4	5	6	7	8	9
Chicago Bears 2		Detroit Lions 2		Cleveland Browns 2				Baltimore Colts 2		Houston Oilers 2								Cleveland Browns 2		Baltimore Colts 2			Oakland Raiders 5					Houston Oilers 2	
																					Miami Dolphins 3			Los Angeles Rams 3					

Teams' longest consecutive seasons with a playoff win all time (minimum 2 seasons)
1980s										1990s										2000s				
0	1	2	3	4	5	6	7	8	9	0	1	2	3	4	5	6	7	8	9	0	1	2	3	4
San Diego Chargers 3				Chicago Bears 2		Denver Broncos 2		San Francisco 49ers 3			Dallas Cowboys 6						Minnesota Vikings 4						Indianapolis Colts 2	
				New York Giants 3			Houston Oilers 2							Pittsburgh Steelers 4				Jacksonville Jaguars 2		Philadelphia Eagles 5				
						Cleveland Browns 2				Washington Redskins 3			Green Bay Packers 5					Miami Dolphins 3				Tennessee Titans 2		
												San Francisco 49ers 3				San Francisco 49ers 3								
																	Denver Broncos 2							

**Bold and light blue is an Active Streak**

Teams' longest consecutive seasons with a playoff win all time (minimum 2 seasons)
2000s		2010s										2020s									
8	9	0	1	2	3	4	5	6	7	8	9	0	1	2	3	4	5	6	7	8	9
Baltimore Ravens 5					Indianapolis Colts 2							Tampa Bay Buccaneers 2			**Houston Texans 3**						
Arizona Cardinals 2			New England Patriots 8										Cincinnati Bengals 2								
	New York Jets 2		San Francisco 49ers 3			Carolina Panthers 2		Atlanta Falcons 2		Kansas City Chiefs 7											
				Seattle Seahawks 5					New Orleans Saints 2			**Buffalo Bills 6**									
													San Francisco 49ers 3								

== See also ==
- List of NFL playoff games
- NFL championships
- NFL playoff results
- NFL starting quarterback playoff records
- NFL head coach playoff records
