= 1993 Seattle Seahawks season =

American football team season

- Owner: Ken Behring
- General manager: Tom Flores
- Head coach: Tom Flores
- Offensive coordinator: Larry Kennan
- Defensive coordinator: Rusty Tillman
- Home stadium: Kingdome

Results
- Record: 6–10
- Division place: 5th AFC West
- Playoffs: Did not qualify
- All-Pros: DT Cortez Kennedy (1st team); FS Eugene Robinson (2nd team)
- Pro Bowlers: RB Chris Warren; DT Cortez Kennedy; FS Eugene Robinson

The 1993 Seattle Seahawks season was the franchise's 18th in the National Football League (NFL). Playing under head coach and general manager Tom Flores, the team finished with a 6–10 win–loss record in the AFC West and missed the playoffs for the fifth straight season. In the first round of the 1993 NFL draft, Seattle selected quarterback Rick Mirer, who became their starter for the 1993 season.

At the end of the season, running back Chris Warren, defensive tackle Cortez Kennedy, and safety Eugene Robinson were selected to play for the AFC in the 1994 Pro Bowl, the NFL's honorary all-star game.

This season would mark the last time until 2004 the Seahawks played the New England Patriots. The Seahawks would not host the Patriots again until 2008.

== Offseason ==
=== NFL draft ===
1993 Seattle Seahawks draft
| Round | Pick | Player | Position | College | Notes |
| 1 | 2 | Rick Mirer | Quarterback | Notre Dame | |
| 2 | 30 | Carlton Gray | Cornerback | UCLA | |
| 4 | 85 | Dean Wells | Linebacker | Kentucky | |
| 5 | 114 | Terrence Warren | Wide receiver | Hampton | |
| 7 | 170 | Michael McCrary * | Defensive end | Wake Forest | |
| 8 | 197 | Jeff Blackshear | Guard | Northeast Louisiana | |
| 8 | 204 | Antonio Edwards | Defensive end | Valdosta State | |
Made roster * Made at least one Pro Bowl during career

=== Undrafted free agents ===
1993 undrafted free agents of note
| Player | Position | College |
|---|---|---|
| Arnold Ale | Linebacker | UCLA |
| Norris Brown | Cornerback | Clemson |
| Ken Burress | Cornerback | Bowling Green |
| C. J. Davis | Wide receiver | Washington State |
| Mike DeHoog | Tackle | Utah |
| Marcus Evans | Linebacker | Youngstown State |
| Peter Gardere | Punter | Texas |
| Paul Long | Center | Ohio State |
| Mike Lustyk | Defensive Tackle | Washington |
| David Oliver | Tackle | Northern Colorado |
| Bob Rees | Tackle | Iowa |
| Alex Smith | Running back | Auburn |
| Tommie Smith | Safety | Washington |
| Mack Strong | Fullback | Georgia |
| Ted Velicher | Guard | Iowa |
| David Webb | Linebacker | USC |

== Personnel ==
=== Staff ===
1993 Seattle Seahawks staff
| **Front office**: Owner – Ken Behring; President – David Behring; Executive vice president – Mickey Loomis; Vice president of football operations – Chuck Allen; Player personnel director – Mike Allman; Assistant player personnel director – Rick Thompson; Pro personnel director – Randy Mueller; College scouting director – Phil Neri; **Head coaches**: general manager/Head Coach – Tom Flores; Assistant head coach – Tom Catlin; **Offensive coaches**: Offensive coordinator/quarterbacks – Larry Kennan; Running backs – Clarence Shelmon; Wide receivers – Bob Bratkowski; Tight ends – Russ Purnell; Offensive line – Howard Mudd | **Defensive coaches**: Defensive coordinator/linebackers – Rusty Tillman; Defensive line – Tommy Brasher; Defensive backs – Paul Moyer; Defensive – Dave Brown; **Special teams coaches**: Special teams – Russ Purnell; **Strength and conditioning**: Strength and conditioning – Frank Raines |

=== Final roster ===
1993 Seattle Seahawks roster
| **Quarterbacks (QB)**: 18 Stan Gelbaugh; 7 Jeff Graham; 10 Dan McGwire; **3** Rick Mirer; **Running backs (RB)**: 43 Tracy Johnson; 22 Jon Vaughn KR; **42** Chris Warren; **32** John L. Williams FB; **Wide receivers (WR)**: 81 Michael Bates KR; **89** Brian Blades; **84** Kelvin Martin PR; 85 Doug Thomas; 86 Robb Thomas; 88 Terrence Warren; **Tight ends (TE)**: **82** Ferrell Edmunds; 87 Paul Green; 83 Trey Junkin LS | **Offensive linemen (OL)**: 69 Jeff Blackshear G; **64** Darrick Brilz G; 79 Jason Childs G/T; **53** Ray Donaldson C; **66** Andy Heck T; **76** Bill Hitchcock G; 78 Mike Keim T; **73** Ray Roberts T; 71 Rickie Shaw T; 56 Joe Tofflemire C; **Defensive linemen (DL)**: **77** Jeff Bryant DE; 67 Antonio Edwards DE; **96** Cortez Kennedy DT; 75 Michael McCrary DE; **72** Joe Nash DT; 91 Tyrone Rodgers DT; **62** Natu Tuatagaloa DE | **Linebackers (LB)**: 57 Ray Berry MLB; 51 David Brandon OLB; 50 Anthony Davis OLB; 55 Dino Hackett MLB; **98** Kevin Murphy OLB; **94** Rod Stephens MLB; 95 Dean Wells MLB; **90** Terry Wooden OLB; **Defensive backs (DB)**: 39 Brian Allred CB; **25** Robert Blackmon SS; 26 Carlton Gray CB; **29** Dwayne Harper CB; **27** Patrick Hunter CB; 20 James Jefferson CB; 44 Dave McCloughan CB/S; **41** Eugene Robinson FS; 37 Rafael Robinson SS; **Special teams (ST)**: 4 John Kasay K; 14 Rick Tuten P | **Practice squad**: 52 Arnold Ale LB; 74 James Atkins T; 24 Muhammad Shamsid-Deen RB; 38 Mack Strong FB; **Reserve**: 54 Grant Feasel C (IR); 59 Mitch Frerotte G (IR); 93 E. J. Junior LB (IR); 36 Rueben Mayes RB (IR); 97 Rufus Porter LB (IR); 70 Michael Sinclair DE (IR); 58 Bob Spitulski LB (IR); Rookies in italics 53 active, 7 reserve, 4 practice squad |

- Starters in bold.
- (*) Denotes players that were selected for the 1994 Pro Bowl.

== Schedule ==
=== Preseason ===
| Week | Date | Opponent | Result | Record | Venue | Recap |
|---|---|---|---|---|---|---|
| 1 | August 7 | Indianapolis Colts | **L** 13–16 (OT) | 0–1 | Kingdome | Recap |
| 2 | August 14 | at Minnesota Vikings | **L** 10–23 | 0–2 | Hubert H. Humphrey Metrodome | Recap |
| 3 | August 21 | San Francisco 49ers | **W** 30–0 | 1–2 | Kingdome | Recap |
| 4 | August 28 | at Houston Oilers | **W** 20–10 | 2–2 | Astrodome | Recap |

=== Regular season ===
| Week | Date | Opponent | Result | Record | Venue | Recap |
|---|---|---|---|---|---|---|
| 1 | September 5 | at **San Diego Chargers** | **L** 12–18 | 0–1 | Jack Murphy Stadium | Recap |
| 2 | September 12 | **Los Angeles Raiders** | **L** 13–17 | 0–2 | Kingdome | Recap |
| 3 | September 19 | at New England Patriots | **W** 17–14 | 1–2 | Foxboro Stadium | Recap |
| 4 | September 26 | at Cincinnati Bengals | **W** 19–10 | 2–2 | Riverfront Stadium | Recap |
| 5 | October 3 | **San Diego Chargers** | **W** 31–14 | 3–2 | Kingdome | Recap |
| 6 | Bye | | | | | |
| 7 | October 17 | at Detroit Lions | **L** 10–30 | 3–3 | Pontiac Silverdome | Recap |
| 8 | October 24 | New England Patriots | **W** 10–9 | 4–3 | Kingdome | Recap |
| 9 | October 31 | at **Denver Broncos** | **L** 17–28 | 4–4 | Mile High Stadium | Recap |
| 10 | November 7 | at Houston Oilers | **L** 14–24 | 4–5 | Houston Astrodome | Recap |
| 11 | November 14 | Cleveland Browns | **W** 22–5 | 5–5 | Kingdome | Recap |
| 12 | Bye | | | | | |
| 13 | November 28 | **Denver Broncos** | **L** 9–17 | 5–6 | Kingdome | Recap |
| 14 | December 5 | **Kansas City Chiefs** | **L** 16–31 | 5–7 | Kingdome | Recap |
| 15 | December 12 | at **Los Angeles Raiders** | **L** 23–27 | 5–8 | Los Angeles Memorial Coliseum | Recap |
| 16 | December 19 | Phoenix Cardinals | **L** 27–30 | 5–9 | Kingdome | Recap |
| 17 | December 26 | Pittsburgh Steelers | **W** 16–6 | 6–9 | Kingdome | Recap |
| 18 | January 2, 1994 | at **Kansas City Chiefs** | **L** 24–34 | 6–10 | Arrowhead Stadium | Recap |
Note: Intra-division opponents are in **bold** text.

== Standings ==
AFC West
| | W | L | T | PCT | PF | PA | STK |
|---|---|---|---|---|---|---|---|
| ^{(3)} Kansas City Chiefs | 11 | 5 | 0 | .688 | 328 | 291 | W1 |
| ^{(4)} Los Angeles Raiders | 10 | 6 | 0 | .625 | 306 | 326 | W1 |
| ^{(5)} Denver Broncos | 9 | 7 | 0 | .563 | 373 | 284 | L2 |
| San Diego Chargers | 8 | 8 | 0 | .500 | 322 | 290 | W2 |
| Seattle Seahawks | 6 | 10 | 0 | .375 | 280 | 314 | L1 |

== Game summaries ==
=== Preseason ===
==== Week P1: vs. Indianapolis Colts ====
Preseason Week One: Seattle Seahawks vs. Indianapolis Colts – Game summary

| Quarter | 1 | 2 | 3 | 4 | OT | Total |
|---|---|---|---|---|---|---|
| Colts | 0 | 10 | 0 | 3 | 3 | 16 |
| Seahawks | 0 | 7 | 6 | 0 | 0 | 13 |

at Kingdome, Seattle

- Date: August 7
- Game time: 6:09 pm local
- Game weather: indoors
- Game attendance: 45,055
- Referee: Jerry Markbreit
- TV: KING
- Gamebook

==== Week P2: at Minnesota Vikings ====
Preseason Week Two: Seattle Seahawks at Minnesota Vikings – Game summary

| Quarter | 1 | 2 | 3 | 4 | Total |
|---|---|---|---|---|---|
| Seahawks | 0 | 0 | 3 | 7 | 10 |
| Vikings | 7 | 9 | 0 | 7 | 23 |

at Metrodome, Minneapolis

- Date: August 14
- Game time: 7:08 pm local
- Game weather: indoors
- Game attendance: 42,240
- Referee: Bernie Kukar
- TV: KING
- Gamebook

==== Week P3: vs. San Francisco 49ers ====
Preseason Week Three: Seattle Seahawks vs. San Francisco 49ers – Game summary

| Quarter | 1 | 2 | 3 | 4 | Total |
|---|---|---|---|---|---|
| 49ers | 0 | 0 | 0 | 0 | 0 |
| Seahawks | 23 | 7 | 0 | 0 | 30 |

at Kingdome, Seattle

- Date: August 21
- Game time: 7:07 pm local
- Game weather: indoors
- Game attendance: 54,111
- Referee: Ron Blum
- TV: KING
- Gamebook

==== Week P4: at Houston Oilers ====
Preseason Week Four: Seattle Seahawks at Houston Oilers – Game summary

| Quarter | 1 | 2 | 3 | 4 | Total |
|---|---|---|---|---|---|
| Seahawks | 3 | 0 | 14 | 3 | 20 |
| Oilers | 0 | 7 | 0 | 3 | 10 |

at Astrodome, Houston, Texas

- Date: August 28
- Game time: 7:05 pm local
- Game weather: indoors
- Game attendance: 43,678
- Referee: Dale Hamer
- TV: KING
- Gamebook

=== Regular season ===
==== Week 1: at San Diego Chargers ====
Week One: Seattle Seahawks at San Diego Chargers – Game summary

| Quarter | 1 | 2 | 3 | 4 | Total |
|---|---|---|---|---|---|
| Seahawks | 7 | 3 | 0 | 2 | 12 |
| Chargers | 6 | 6 | 0 | 6 | 18 |

at San Diego Stadium, San Diego, California

- Date: September 5
- Game time: 1:01 pm local
- Game weather: clear, 72 °F (22 °C), 71% humidity, wind WNW 11 miles per hour (18 km/h)
- Game attendance: 58,039
- Referee: Howard Roe
- TV announcers (NBC): Dan Hicks & Joe Gibbs
- Recap Gamebook

Game information

First quarter

- SEA – Joe Nash 13-yard interception return (John Kasay kick), 14:07 (SEA 7–0)
- SD – John Carney 26-yard field goal, 5:54 (SEA 7–3)
- SD – John Carney 44-yard field goal, 3:26 (SEA 7–6)

Second quarter

- SEA – John Kasay 27-yard field goal, 11:45 (SEA 10–6)
- SD – John Carney 50-yard field goal, 8:07 (SEA 10–9)
- SD – John Carney 32-yard field goal, 3:21 (SD 12–10)

Third quarter

- No scoring plays

Fourth quarter

- SD – John Carney 51-yard field goal, 12:44 (SD 15–10)
- SD – John Carney 19-yard field goal, 5:35 (SD 18–10)
- SEA – Safety, John Kidd downed ball in end zone, 0:00 (SD 18–12)

Top passers

- SEA – Rick Mirer: 20/27, 154 yds, 1 INT
- SD – Stan Humphries: 13/30, 123 yds, 2 INT

Top rushers

- SEA – Chris Warren: 12 car, 38 yds
- SD – Marion Butts: 15 car, 87 yds

Top receivers

- SEA – Brian Blades: 5 rec, 54 yds
- SD – Anthony Miller: 6 rec, 56 yds

Team – pass – rush – total – to

- SEA – 141 – 89 – 230 – 2
- SD – 109 – 160 – 269 – 2

Seattle began the season with an 18–12 loss to the San Diego Chargers in a game that featured no offensive touchdowns. Joe Nash scored the game's first points with a 12-yard interception return for a touchdown, on a ball tipped into the air by Cortez Kennedy. Though the Seattle defense held the Chargers to no touchdowns, kicker John Carney had made six field goals to Seattle's one, as the Chargers led 18–10 in the fourth quarter. With 1:25 left in the game, Mirer completed a pass to Brian Blades to the Chargers' two-yard line, but a hit by linebacker Gary Plummer made Blades lose the ball. Seattle scored a safety as the Chargers ran out the clock to win 18–12. Sportswriter John Clayton noted that San Diego's game-plan was to run the football with halfback Marion Butts, and to run the ball to the left side, away from Kennedy. Clayton observed that the strategy worked against a defense he described as "tough", but mistakes by Seattle's linebackers allowed San Diego to earn "modest gains" on plays to keep drives moving. The first rookie quarterback to start a Seahawks season opener, Mirer finished the game with 154 yards and completed 20 of 27 pass attempts.

==== Week 2: vs. Los Angeles Raiders ====
Week Two: Seattle Seahawks vs. Los Angeles Raiders – Game summary

| Quarter | 1 | 2 | 3 | 4 | Total |
|---|---|---|---|---|---|
| Raiders | 7 | 10 | 0 | 0 | 17 |
| Seahawks | 0 | 10 | 0 | 3 | 13 |

at Kingdome, Seattle

- Date: September 12
- Game time: 5:06 pm local
- Game weather: indoors
- Game attendance: 58,836
- Referee: Red Cashion
- TV announcers (TNT): Gary Bender & Pat Haden
- Gamebook

Game information

First quarter

- LA – Jeff Hostetler 2-yard run (Jeff Jaeger kick), 4:41 (LA 7–0)

Second quarter

- SEA – Chris Warren 6-yard run (John Kasay kick), 14:00 (Tied 7–7)
- SEA – John Kasay 39-yard field goal, 9:53 (SEA 10–7)
- LA – Jeff Jaeger 36-yard field goal, 4:47 (Tied 10–10)
- LA – Tim Brown 33-yard pass from Jeff Hostetler (Jeff Jaeger kick), 1:13 (LA 17–10)

Third quarter

- No scoring plays

Fourth quarter

- SEA – John Kasay 53-yard field goal, 7:49 (LA 17–13)

Top passers

- LA – Jeff Hostetler: 18/33, 195 yds, 1 TD, 1 INT
- SEA – Rick Mirer: 14/22, 149 yds, 2 INT

Top rushers

- LA – Greg Robinson: 17 car, 54 yds
- SEA – Chris Warren: 20 car, 76 yds, 1 TD

Top receivers

- LA – Tim Brown: 9 rec, 97 yds, 1 TD
- SEA – Chris Warren: 4 rec, 61 yds

Team – pass – rush – total – to

- LA – 181 – 83 – 264 – 1
- SEA – 120 – 112 – 232 – 3

In their home opener, Seattle lost to the Los Angeles Raiders, 13–17.

==== Week 3: at New England Patriots ====
Week Three: Seattle Seahawks at New England Patriots – Game summary

| Quarter | 1 | 2 | 3 | 4 | Total |
|---|---|---|---|---|---|
| Seahawks | 7 | 0 | 10 | 0 | 17 |
| Patriots | 0 | 0 | 0 | 14 | 14 |

at Foxboro Stadium, Foxborough, Massachusetts

- Date: September 19
- Game time: 1:01 pm local
- Game weather: cloudy, 67 °F (19 °C), 58% humidity, wind NW 20 miles per hour (32 km/h)
- Game attendance: 50,392
- Referee: Bob McElwee
- TV announcers (NBC): Don Criqui & Beasley Reece
- Gamebook

Game information

First quarter

- SEA – Brian Blades 4-yard pass from Rick Mirer (John Kasay kick), 9:21 (SEA 7–0)

Second quarter

- No scoring plays

Third quarter

- SEA – John Kasay 24-yard field goal, 3:03 (SEA 10–0)
- SEA – Chris Warren 15-yard run (John Kasay kick), 0:30 (SEA 17–0)

Fourth quarter

- NE – Ben Coates 25-yard pass from Drew Bledsoe (Scott Sisson kick), 13:27 (SEA 17–7)
- NE – Sam Gash 4-yard run (Scott Sisson kick), 5:54 (SEA 17–14)

Top passers

- SEA – Rick Mirer: 12/16, 117 yds, 1 TD, 1 INT
- NE – Drew Bledsoe: 20/44, 238 yds, 1 TD, 2 INT

Top rushers

- SEA – Chris Warren: 36 car, 174 yds, 1 TD
- NE – Leonard Russell: 8 car, 21 yds

Top receivers

- SEA – Brian Blades: 6 rec, 50 yds, 1 TD
- NE – Ray Crittenden: 5 rec, 68 yds

Team – pass – rush – total – to

- SEA – 125 – 209 – 334 – 3
- NE – 223 – 51 – 274 – 3

==== Week 4: at Cincinnati Bengals ====
Week Four: Seattle Seahawks at Cincinnati Bengals – Game summary

| Quarter | 1 | 2 | 3 | 4 | Total |
|---|---|---|---|---|---|
| Seahawks | 0 | 6 | 3 | 10 | 19 |
| Bengals | 0 | 0 | 0 | 10 | 10 |

at Riverfront Stadium, Cincinnati, Ohio

- Date: September 26
- Game time: 4:00 pm local
- Game weather: cloudy, 60 °F (16 °C), 78% humidity, wind W 15 miles per hour (24 km/h)
- Game attendance: 46,880
- Referee: Gary Lane
- TV announcers (NBC): Charlie Jones & Todd Christensen
- Gamebook

Game information

First quarter

- No scoring plays

Second quarter

- SEA – John Kasay 32-yard field goal, 8:50 (SEA 3–0)
- SEA – John Kasay 35-yard field goal, 0:12 (SEA 6–0)

Third quarter

- SEA – John Kasay 23-yard field goal, 9:15 (SEA 9–0)

Fourth quarter

- CIN – Doug Pelfrey 23-yard field goal, 12:43 (SEA 9–3)
- CIN – Carl Pickens 21-yard pass from Jay Schroeder (Doug Pelfrey kick), 8:21 (CIN 10–9)
- SEA – Rod Stephens recovered fumble in end zone (John Kasay kick), 4:38 (SEA 16–10)
- SEA – John Kasay 35-yard field goal, 2:37 (SEA 19–10)

Top passers

- SEA – Rick Mirer: 18/30, 181 yds
- CIN – Jay Schroeder: 14/22, 183 yds, 1 TD

Top rushers

- SEA – Chris Warren: 19 car, 75 yds
- CIN – Harold Green: 13 car, 16 yds

Top receivers

- SEA – Brian Blades: 5 rec, 64 yds
- CIN – Tony McGee: 7 rec, 102 yds

Team – pass – rush – total – to

- SEA –166 – 139 – 305 – 2
- CIN – 324 – 30 – 354 – 3

==== Week 5: vs. San Diego Chargers ====
Week Five: Seattle Seahawks vs. San Diego Chargers – Game summary

| Quarter | 1 | 2 | 3 | 4 | Total |
|---|---|---|---|---|---|
| Chargers | 7 | 0 | 0 | 7 | 14 |
| Seahawks | 7 | 10 | 7 | 7 | 31 |

at Kingdome, Seattle

- Date: October 3
- Game time: 1:02 pm local
- Game weather: indoors
- Game attendance: 54,778
- Referee: Dick Hantak
- TV announcers (NBC): Tom Hammond & Cris Collinsworth
- Gamebook

Game information

First quarter

- SEA – Rick Mirer 2-yard run (John Kasay kick), 10:24 (SEA 7–0)
- SD – Marion Butts 2-yard run (John Carney kick), 2:37 (Tied 7–7)

Second quarter

- SEA – John Kasay 33-yard field goal, 7:39 (SEA 10–7)
- SEA – Brian Blades 17-yard pass from Dan McGwire (John Kasay kick), 0:10 (SEA 17–7)

Third quarter

- SEA – Chris Warren 1-yard run (John Kasay kick), 7:20 (SEA 24–7)

Fourth quarter

- SEA – Kelvin Martin 18-yard pass from Rick Mirer (John Kasay kick), 4:59 (SEA 31–7)
- SD – Anthony Miller 11-yard pass from John Friesz (John Carney kick), 2:11 (SEA 31–14)

Top passers

- SD – Stan Humphries: 12/27, 141 yds, 2 INT
- SEA – Rick Mirer: 25/40, 282 yds, 1 TD

Top rushers

- SD – Marion Butts: 11 car, 62 yds, 1 TD
- SEA – Chris Warren: 23 car, 32 yds, 1 TD

Top receivers

- SD – Anthony Miller: 10 rec, 123 yds, 1 TD
- SEA – Brian Blades: 10 rec, 132 yds, 1 TD

Team – pass – rush – total – to

- SD – 221 – 94 – 315 – 2
- SEA – 287 – 57 – 344 – 0

==== Week 7: at Detroit Lions ====
Week Seven: Seattle Seahawks at Detroit Lions – Game summary

| Quarter | 1 | 2 | 3 | 4 | Total |
|---|---|---|---|---|---|
| Seahawks | 7 | 0 | 3 | 0 | 10 |
| Lions | 0 | 14 | 13 | 3 | 30 |

at Silverdome, Pontiac, Michigan

- Date: October 17
- Game time: 1:01 pm local
- Game weather: indoors
- Game attendance: 60,801
- Referee: Gordon McCarter
- TV announcers (NBC): Don Criqui & Beasley Reece
- Gamebook

Game information

First quarter

- SEA – Kelvin Martin 6-yard pass from Rick Mirer (John Kasay kick), 13:28 (SEA 7–0)

Second quarter

- DET – Herman Moore 13-yard pass from Rodney Peete (Jason Hanson kick), 14:53 (Tied 7–7)
- DET – Herman Moore 11-yard pass from Rodney Peete (Jason Hanson kick), 1:27 (DET 14–7)

Third quarter

- SEA – John Kasay 19-yard field goal, 10:04 (DET 14–10)
- DET – Mel Gray 95-yard kickoff return (Jason Hanson kick), 9:45 (DET 21–10)

Fourth quarter

- DET – Jason Hanson 34-yard field goal, 8:01 (DET 24–10)
- DET – Jason Hanson 32-yard field goal, 2:04 (DET 27–10)
- DET – Jason Hanson 35-yard field goal, 5:15 (DET 30–10)

Top passers

- SEA – Rick Mirer: 23/39, 189 yds, 1 TD, 3 INT
- DET – Rodney Peete: 14/26, 157 yds, 2 TD, 1 INT

Top rushers

- SEA – Chris Warren: 15 car, 37 yds
- DET – Barry Sanders: 22 car, 101 yds

Top receivers

- SEA – Kelvin Martin: 8 rec, 80 yds, 1 TD
- DET – Herman Moore: 8 rec, 98 yds, 2 TD

Team – pass – rush – total – to

- SEA – 166 – 66 – 232 – 4
- DET – 151 – 141 – 292 – 2

==== Week 8: vs. New England Patriots ====
Week Eight: Seattle Seahawks vs. New England Patriots – Game summary

| Quarter | 1 | 2 | 3 | 4 | Total |
|---|---|---|---|---|---|
| Patriots | 0 | 0 | 3 | 6 | 9 |
| Seahawks | 0 | 3 | 0 | 7 | 10 |

at Kingdome, Seattle

- Date: October 24
- Game time: 1:01 pm local
- Game weather: indoors
- Game attendance: 56,526
- Referee: Larry Nemmers
- TV announcers (NBC): Dan Hicks and Dan Hampton
- Gamebook

Game information

First quarter

- No scoring plays

Second quarter

- SEA – John Kasay 30-yard field goal, 3:15 (SEA 3–0)

Third quarter

- NE – Scott Sisson 36-yard field goal, 3:11 (Tied 3–3)

Fourth quarter

- NE – Scott Sisson 25-yard field goal, 14:03 (NE 6–3)
- NE – Scott Sisson 19-yard field goal, 9:07 (NE 9–3)
- SEA – Brian Blades 1-yard pass from Rick Mirer (John Kasay kick), 0:25 (SEA 10–9)

Top passers

- NE – Scott Secules: 15/43, 203 yds, 1 TD, 2 INT
- SEA – Rick Mirer: 22/43, 203 yds, 1 TD, 2 INT

Top rushers

- NE – Leonard Russell: 21 car, 97 yds
- SEA – John L. Williams: 7 car, 29 yds

Top receivers

- NE – Leonard Russell: 3 rec, 28 yds
- SEA – Brian Blades: 9 rec, 70 yds, 1 TD

Team – pass – rush – total – to

- NE – 129 – 166 – 295 – 2
- SEA – 194 – 67 – 261 – 2

==== Week 9 at Denver Broncos ====
Week Nine: Seattle Seahawks at Denver Broncos – Game summary

| Quarter | 1 | 2 | 3 | 4 | Total |
|---|---|---|---|---|---|
| Seahawks | 7 | 0 | 3 | 7 | 17 |
| Broncos | 0 | 21 | 7 | 0 | 28 |

at Mile High Stadium, Denver, Colorado

- Date: October 31
- Game time: 2:02 pm local
- Game weather: clear, 62 °F (17 °C), 21% humidity, wind N 11 miles per hour (18 km/h)
- Game attendance: 73,644
- Referee: Ed Hochuli
- TV announcers (NBC): Tom Hammond & Cris Collinsworth
- Gamebook

Game information

First quarter

- SEA – John L. Williams 10-yard run (John Kasay kick), 9:23 (SEA 7–0)

Second quarter

- DEN – Vance Johnson 20-yard pass from John Elway (Jason Elam kick), 12:16 (Tied 7–7)
- DEN – Robert Delpino 2-yard run (Jason Elam kick), 8:04 (DEN 14–7)
- DEN – Shannon Sharpe 5-yard pass from John Elway (Jason Elam kick), 0:44 (DEN 21–7)

Third quarter

- SEA – John Kasay 53-yard field goal, 8:38 (DEN 21–10)
- DEN – Robert Delpino 1-yard run (Jason Elam kick), 2:41 (DEN 28–10)

Fourth quarter

- SEA – John L. Williams 2-yard run (John Kasay kick), 9:47 (DEN 28–17)

Top passers

- SEA – Rick Mirer: 16/30, 201 yds, 2 INT
- DEN – John Elway: 23/36, 255 yds, 2 TD, 1 INT

Top rushers

- SEA – Chris Warren: 14 car, 53 yds
- DEN – Rod Bernstine: 18 car, 64 yds

Top receivers

- SEA – Brian Blades: 7 rec, 87 yds
- DEN – Shannon Sharpe: 7 rec, 64 yds, 1 TD

Team – pass – rush – total – to

- SEA – 184 – 103 – 287 – 2
- DEN – 239 – 87 – 326 – 1

==== Week 10: at Houston Oilers ====
Week Ten: Seattle Seahawks at Houston Oilers – Game summary

| Quarter | 1 | 2 | 3 | 4 | Total |
|---|---|---|---|---|---|
| Seahawks | 7 | 0 | 0 | 7 | 14 |
| Oilers | 13 | 9 | 2 | 0 | 24 |

at Astrodome, Houston, Texas

- Date: November 7
- Game time: 12:01 pm local
- Game weather: indoors
- Game attendance: 50,447
- Referee: Howard Roe
- TV announcers (NBC): Dan Hicks & Joe Gibbs
- Gamebook

Game information

First quarter

- HOU – Webster Slaughter 32-yard pass from Warren Moon (Al Del Greco kick), 8:05 (HOU 7–0)
- SEA – Kelvin Martin 53-yard pass from Rick Mirer (John Kasay kick), 2:38 (Tied 7–7)
- HOU – Ernest Givins 32-yard pass from Warren Moon (PAT failed), 0:20 (HOU 13–7)

Second quarter

- HOU – Al Del Greco 33-yard field goal, 6:36 (HOU 16–7)
- HOU – Al Del Greco 51-yard field goal, 2:37 (HOU 19–7)
- HOU – Al Del Greco 39-yard field goal, 0:07 (HOU 22–7)

Third quarter

- HOU – Safety, Rick Mirer intentional grounding in end zone, 6:17 (HOU 24–7)

Fourth quarter

- SEA – Chris Warren 10-yard run (John Kasay kick), 12:57 (HOU 24–14)

Top passers

- SEA – Rick Mirer: 12/20, 175 yds, 1 TD, 1 INT
- HOU – Warren Moon: 36/55, 369 yds, 2 TD, 2 INT

Top rushers

- SEA – Chris Warren: 13 car, 54 yds, 1 TD
- HOU – Gary Brown: 12 car, 60 yds

Top receivers

- SEA – Kelvin Martin: 4 rec, 85 yds, 1 TD
- HOU – Webster Slaughter: 9 rec, 135 yds, 1 TD

Team – pass – rush – total – to

- SEA – 168 – 84 – 252 – 1
- HOU – 347 – 111 – 458 – 2

==== Week 11: vs. Cleveland Browns ====
Week Eleven: Seattle Seahawks vs. Cleveland Browns – Game summary

| Quarter | 1 | 2 | 3 | 4 | Total |
|---|---|---|---|---|---|
| Browns | 2 | 3 | 0 | 0 | 5 |
| Seahawks | 7 | 0 | 7 | 8 | 22 |

at Kingdome, Seattle

- Date: November 14
- Game time: 1:01 pm local
- Game weather: indoors
- Game attendance: 54,622
- Referee: Red Cashion
- TV announcers (NBC): Drew Goodman & Dan Hampton
- Gamebook

Game information

First quarter

- SEA – Robert Blackmon 5-yard fumble return (John Kasay kick), 14:46 (SEA 7–0)
- CLE – Safety, Anthony Pleasant tackled Rick Mirer in end zone, 8:36 (SEA 7–2)

Second quarter

- CLE – Matt Stover 25-yard field goal, 3:10 (SEA 7–5)

Third quarter

- SEA – John L. Williams 23-yard run (John Kasay kick), 3:58 (SEA 14–5)

Fourth quarter

- SEA – John Kasay 42-yard field goal, 9:12 (SEA 17–5)
- SEA – John Kasay 47-yard field goal, 4:30 (SEA 20–5)
- SEA – Safety, Antonio Edwards tackled Todd Philcox in end zone, 1:28 (SEA 22–5)

Top passers

- CLE – Todd Philcox: 9/20, 85 yds, 2 INT
- SEA – Rick Mirer: 11/27, 114 yds, 1 TD

Top rushers

- CLE – Eric Metcalf: 13 car, 75 yds
- SEA – Chris Warren: 24 car, 112 yds

Top receivers

- CLE – Michael Jackson: 1 rec, 56 yds
- SEA – John L. Williams: 6 rec, 60 yds, 1 TD

Team – pass – rush – total – to

- CLE – 57 – 175 – 232 – 7
- SEA – 104 – 119 – 223 – 0

As of the 2017 season, this is the second most-recent of only eight NFL games since 1940 where both teams scored a safety, with the only more recent one occurring the following season between the Cardinals and the Oilers.

==== Week 13: vs. Denver Broncos ====
Week Thirteen: Seattle Seahawks vs. Denver Broncos – Game summary

| Quarter | 1 | 2 | 3 | 4 | Total |
|---|---|---|---|---|---|
| Broncos | 0 | 7 | 3 | 7 | 17 |
| Seahawks | 0 | 0 | 2 | 7 | 9 |

at Kingdome, Seattle

- Date: November 28
- Game time: 1:01 pm local
- Game weather: indoors
- Game attendance: 57,812
- Referee: Dick Hantak
- TV announcers (NBC): Charlie Jones & Todd Christensen
- Gamebook

Game information

First quarter

- No scoring plays

Second quarter

- DEN – Shannon Sharpe 50-yard pass from John Elway (Jason Elam kick), 14:54 (DEN 7–0)

Third quarter

- SEA – Safety, Rod Stephens tackled John Elway in end zone, 12:12 (DEN 7–2)
- DEN – Jason Elam 25-yard field goal, 0:49 (DEN 10–2)

Fourth quarter

- SEA – Kelvin Martin 10-yard pass from Rick Mirer (John Kasay kick), 7:55 (DEN 10–7)
- DEN – Rod Bernstine 2-yard run (Jason Elam kick), 4:06 (DEN 17–9)

Top passers

- DEN – John Elway: 20/37, 226 yds, 1 TD, 1 INT
- SEA – Rick Mirer: 17/37, 188 yds, 1 TD, 1 INT

Top rushers

- DEN – Rod Bernstine: 17 car, 47 yds, 1 TD
- SEA – Chris Warren: 19 car, 95 yds

Top receivers

- DEN – Shannon Sharpe: 3 rec, 72 yds, 1 TD
- SEA – Kelvin Martin: 3 rec, 73 yds, 1 TD

Team – pass – rush – total – to

- DEN – 206 – 101 – 307 – 2
- SEA – 161 – 127 – 288 – 2

==== Week 14: vs. Kansas City Chiefs ====
Week Fourteen: Seattle Seahawks vs. Kansas City Chiefs – Game summary

| Quarter | 1 | 2 | 3 | 4 | Total |
|---|---|---|---|---|---|
| Chiefs | 10 | 7 | 14 | 0 | 31 |
| Seahawks | 3 | 3 | 7 | 3 | 16 |

at Kingdome, Seattle

- Date: November 5
- Game time: 1:02 pm local
- Game weather: indoors
- Game attendance: 58,511
- Referee: Jerry Markbreit
- TV announcers (NBC): Dan Hicks & Joe Gibbs
- Gamebook

Game information

First quarter

- SEA – John Kasay 22-yard field goal, 9:27 (SEA 3–0)
- KC – Marcus Allen 1-yard run (Nick Lowery kick), 5:57 (KC 7–3)
- KC – Nick Lowery 47-yard field goal, 0:29 (KC 10–3)

Second quarter

- KC – Derrick Thomas 86-yard fumble return (Nick Lowery kick), 11:09 (KC 17–3)
- SEA – John Kasay 26-yard field goal, 4:23 (KC 17–6)

Third quarter

- KC – Marcus Allen 1-yard run (Nick Lowery kick), 11:12 (KC 24–6)
- KC – Marcus Allen 30-yard run (Nick Lowery kick), 8:56 (KC 31–6)
- SEA – Chris Warren 1-yard run (John Kasay kick), 4:50 (KC 31–13)

Fourth quarter

- SEA – John Kasay 37-yard field goal, 9:53 (SEA 31–16)

Top passers

- KC – Joe Montana: 20/30, 239 yds
- SEA – Rick Mirer: 18/30, 287 yds, 2 INT

Top rushers

- KC – Marcus Allen: 12 car, 73 yds, 3 TD
- SEA – Chris Warren: 18 car, 59 yds, 1 TD

Top receivers

- KC – Willie Davis: 3 rec, 67 yds
- SEA – Brian Blades: 7 rec, 134 yds

Team – pass – rush – total – to

- KC – 231 – 106 – 337 – 0
- SEA – 275 – 90 – 365 – 4

==== Week 15: at Los Angeles Raiders ====
Week Fifteen: Seattle Seahawks at Los Angeles Raiders – Game summary

| Quarter | 1 | 2 | 3 | 4 | Total |
|---|---|---|---|---|---|
| Seahawks | 0 | 9 | 0 | 14 | 23 |
| Raiders | 3 | 7 | 17 | 0 | 27 |

at Los Angeles Memorial Coliseum, Los Angeles

- Date: November 12
- Game time: 1:01 pm local
- Game weather: clear, 68 °F (20 °C), 29% humidity, wind W 12 miles per hour (19 km/h)
- Game attendance: 38,161
- Referee: Gary Lane
- TV announcers (NBC): Dan Hicks & Dan Hampton
- Gamebook

Game information

First quarter

- LA – Jeff Jaeger 24-yard field goal, 6:21 (LA 3–0)

Second quarter

- SEA – Chris Warren 1-yard run (John Kasay kick), 14:46 (SEA 7–3)
- SEA – Safety, Rod Stephens tackled Nick Bell in end zone, 4:29 (SEA 9–3)
- LA – Jeff Hostetler 4-yard run (Jeff Jaeger kick), 0:32 (LA 10–9)

Third quarter

- LA – Tim Brown 74-yard punt return (Jeff Jaeger kick), 13:15 (LA 17–9)
- LA – Jeff Jaeger 48-yard field goal, 6:39 (LA 20–9)
- LA – James Jett 56-yard pass from Jeff Hostetler (Jeff Jaeger kick), 5:01 (LA 27–9)

Fourth quarter

- SEA – Rick Mirer 2-yard run (John Kasay kick), 6:24 (LA 27–16)
- SEA – Kelvin Martin 7-yard pass from Rick Mirer (John Kasay kick), 1:15 (LA 27–23)

Top passers

- SEA – Rick Mirer: 20/36, 171 yds, 1 TD, 1 INT
- LA – Jeff Hostetler: 18/25, 278 yds, 1 TD

Top rushers

- SEA – Chris Warren: 21 car, 73 yds, 1 TD
- LA – Nick Bell: 12 car, 35 yds

Top receivers

- SEA – Brian Blades: 5 rec, 47 yds
- LA – Rocket Ismail: 4 rec, 71 yds

Team – pass – rush – total – to

- SEA – 169 – 134 – 303 – 1
- LA – 303 – 59 – 362 – 2

==== Week 16: vs. Phoenix Cardinals ====
Week Sixteen: Seattle Seahawks vs. Phoenix Cardinals – Game summary

| Quarter | 1 | 2 | 3 | 4 | OT | Total |
|---|---|---|---|---|---|---|
| Cardinals | 7 | 0 | 7 | 13 | 3 | 30 |
| Seahawks | 10 | 10 | 0 | 7 | 0 | 27 |

at Kingdome, Seattle

- Date: December 19
- Game time: 1:02 pm local
- Game weather: indoors
- Game attendance: 45,737
- Referee: Ron Blum
- TV announcers (CBS): Jim Hill & Hank Stram
- Gamebook

Game information

First quarter

- SEA – Chris Warren 45-yard run (John Kasay kick), 13:47 (SEA 7–0)
- SEA – John Kasay 37-yard field goal, 6:05 (SEA 10–0)
- PHX – Randal Hill 58-yard pass from Steve Beuerlein (Greg Davis kick), 4:23 (SEA 10–7)

Second quarter

- SEA – John Kasay 47-yard field goal, 0:54 (SEA 13–7)
- SEA – Ferrell Edmunds 1-yard pass from Rick Mirer (John Kasay kick), 0:10 (SEA 20–7)

Third quarter

- PHX – Gary Clark 20-yard pass from Steve Beuerlein (Greg Davis kick), 4:12 (SEA 20–14)

Fourth quarter

- PHX – Larry Centers 16-yard pass from Steve Beuerlein (Greg Davis kick), 13:08 (PHX 21–20)
- PHX – Greg Davis 50-yard field goal, 5:09 (PHX 24–20)
- SEA – Rick Mirer 1-yard run (John Kasay kick), 1:22 (SEA 27–24)
- PHX – Greg Davis 55-yard field goal, 0:00 (Tied 27–27)

Overtime

- PHX – Greg Davis 41-yard field goal, 8:15 (PHX 30–27)

Top passers

- PHX – Steve Beuerlein: 34/53, 431 yds, 3 TD, 2 INT
- SEA – Rick Mirer: 15/30, 165 yds, 1 TD

Top rushers

- PHX – Ronald Moore: 24 car, 62 yds
- SEA – Chris Warren: 27 car, 168 yds

Top receivers

- PHX – Gary Clark: 12 rec, 152 yds, 1 TD
- SEA – Kelvin Martin: 4 rec, 74 yds

Team – pass – rush – total – to

- PHX – 405 – 71 – 476 – 4
- SEA – 153 – 212 – 365 – 1

==== Week 17: vs. Pittsburgh Steelers ====
Week Seventeen: Seattle Seahawks vs. Pittsburgh Steelers – Game summary

| Quarter | 1 | 2 | 3 | 4 | Total |
|---|---|---|---|---|---|
| Steelers | 0 | 3 | 0 | 3 | 6 |
| Seahawks | 7 | 3 | 3 | 3 | 16 |

at Kingdome, Seattle

- Date: December 26
- Game time: 1:01 pm local
- Game weather: indoors
- Game attendance: 51,814
- Referee: Bob McElwee
- TV announcers (NBC): Charlie Jones & Todd Christensen
- Gamebook

Game information

First quarter

- SEA – Paul Green 2-yard pass from Rick Mirer (John Kasay kick), 3:35 (SEA 7–0)

Second quarter

- SEA – John Kasay 32-yard field goal, 12:39 (SEA 10–0)
- PIT – Gary Anderson 42-yard field goal, 6:41 (SEA 10–3)

Third quarter

- SEA – John Kasay 48-yard field goal, 6:52 (SEA 13–3)

Fourth quarter

- PIT – Gary Anderson 43-yard field goal, 14:37 (SEA 13–6)
- SEA – John Kasay 35-yard field goal, 6:24 (SEA 16–6)

Top passers

- PIT – Neil O'Donnell: 20/43, 285 yds, 1 INT
- SEA – Rick Mirer: 12/29, 117 yds, 1 TD, 1 INT

Top rushers

- PIT – Leroy Thompson: 12 car, 66 yds
- SEA – Jon Vaughn: 26 car, 131 yds

Top receivers

- PIT – Eric Green: 7 rec, 119 yds
- SEA – Brian Blades: 4 rec, 60 yds

Team – pass – rush – total – to

- PIT – 264 – 116 – 380 – 2
- SEA – 101 – 267 – 368 – 1

==== Week 18: at Kansas City Chiefs ====
Week Eighteen: Seattle Seahawks at Kansas City Chiefs – Game summary

| Quarter | 1 | 2 | 3 | 4 | Total |
|---|---|---|---|---|---|
| Seahawks | 3 | 7 | 0 | 14 | 24 |
| Chiefs | 10 | 17 | 0 | 7 | 34 |

at Arrowhead Stadium, Kansas City, Missouri

- Date: January 2
- Game time: 12:00 pm local
- Game weather: cloudy, 38 °F (3 °C), 73% humidity, wind SE 11 miles per hour (18 km/h)
- Game attendance: 72,136
- Referee: Tom White
- TV announcers (NBC): Dan Hicks & Joe Gibbs
- Gamebook

Game information

First quarter

- SEA – John Kasay 55-yard field goal, 12:05 (SEA 3–0)
- KC – Willie Davis 14-yard pass from Joe Montana (Nick Lowery kick), 8:45 (KC 7–3)
- KC – Nick Lowery 23-yard field goal, 2:52 (KC 10–3)

Second quarter

- KC – Todd McNair 3-yard run (Nick Lowery kick), 9:15 (KC 17–3)
- KC – Albert Lewis recovered fumble in end zone (Nick Lowery kick), 7:17 (KC 24–3)
- SEA – Tracy Johnson 2-yard pass from Rick Mirer (John Kasay kick), 0:52 (KC 24–10)
- KC – Nick Lowery 47-yard field goal, 0:00 (KC 27–10)

Third quarter

- No scoring plays

Fourth quarter

- SEA – John L. Williams 23-yard run (John Kasay kick), 11:44 (KC 27–17)
- SEA – Ferrell Edmunds 4-yard pass from Rick Mirer (John Kasay kick), 6:27 (KC 27–24)
- KC – Todd McNair 2-yard run (Nick Lowery kick), 0:46 (KC 34–24)

Top passers

- SEA – Rick Mirer: 19/30, 140 yds, 2 TD
- KC – Joe Montana: 18/28, 210 yds, 1 TD, 1 INT

Top rushers

- SEA – John L. Williams: 16 car, 102 yds, 1 TD
- KC – Todd McNair: 17 car, 46 yds, 2 TD

Top receivers

- SEA – Brian Blades: 5 rec, 69 yds
- KC – J.J. Birden: 6 rec, 68 yds

Team – pass – rush – total – to

- SEA – 140 – 140 – 280 – 3
- KC – 263 – 109 – 372 – 2
