= 1994 Seattle Seahawks season =

American football team season

- Owner: Ken Behring
- General manager: Tom Flores
- Head coach: Tom Flores
- Offensive coordinator: Larry Kennan
- Defensive coordinator: Rusty Tillman
- Home stadium: Husky Stadium; Kingdome

Results
- Record: 6–10
- Division place: 5th AFC West
- Playoffs: Did not qualify
- All-Pros: RB Chris Warren (2nd team); DT Cortez Kennedy (1st team); P Rick Tuten (2nd team)
- Pro Bowlers: RB Chris Warren; DT Cortez Kennedy; P Rick Tuten

The 1994 Seattle Seahawks season was the team's 19th season with the National Football League (NFL). The 1994 season was head coach Tom Flores' last with the team. The team played their two preseason and first three regular season home games at Husky Stadium due to the collapse of four ceiling tiles at the Kingdome on July 19.

Chris Warren and the Seahawks rushing attack ranked second best for the season.

== Offseason ==
=== NFL draft ===
1994 Seattle Seahawks draft
| Round | Pick | Player | Position | College | Notes |
| 1 | 8 | Sam Adams * | Defensive end | Texas A&M | |
| 2 | 36 | Kevin Mawae * ^{†} | Guard | LSU | |
| 3 | 73 | Lamar Smith | Running back | Houston | |
| 4 | 110 | Larry Whigham | Defensive back | Northeast Louisiana | |
| 7 | 202 | Carlester Crumpler | Tight end | East Carolina | |
Made roster * Made at least one Pro Bowl during career

=== Undrafted free agents ===
1994 undrafted free agents of note
| Player | Position | College |
|---|---|---|
| Jason Atkinson | Linebacker | Texas A&M |
| Jay Bellamy | Safety | Rutgers |
| Jed DeVries | Tackle | Utah State |
| Bobby Hamilton | Defensive end | Southern Miss |
| Mike Kegarise | Tackle | Edinboro |
| James McKnight | Wide receiver | Liberty |
| Orlando Watters | Cornerback | Arkansas |
| Rick Wood | Fullback | Norfolk State |

== Personnel ==
=== Staff ===
1994 Seattle Seahawks staff
| **Front office**: Owner – Ken Behring; President – David Behring; Executive vice president – Mickey Loomis; Vice president of football operations – Chuck Allen; Player personnel director – Mike Allman; Assistant player personnel director – Rick Thompson; Pro personnel director – Randy Mueller; College scouting director – Phil Neri; **Head coaches**: General manager/head coach – Tom Flores; **Offensive coaches**: Offensive coordinator/quarterbacks – Larry Kennan; Running backs – Clarence Shelmon; Wide receivers – Bob Bratkowski; Tight ends – Russ Purnell; Offensive line – Howard Mudd | **Defensive coaches**: Defensive coordinator/linebackers – Rusty Tillman; Defensive line – Tommy Brasher; Defensive backs – Paul Moyer; Defensive – Dave Brown; Quality control – Tom Catlin; **Special teams coaches**: Special teams – Russ Purnell; **Strength and conditioning**: Strength and conditioning – Frank Raines |

=== Final roster ===
1994 Seattle Seahawks roster
| **Quarterbacks (QB)**: 18 Stan Gelbaugh; 12 Jeff Graham; 10 Dan McGwire; **Running backs (RB)**: 22 Beno Bryant KR; **43** Tracy Johnson FB; 35 Steve Smith; 38 Mack Strong FB; **42** Chris Warren; **Wide receivers (WR)**: 81 Michael Bates KR; **89** Brian Blades; 11 Ronnie Harris; **84** Kelvin Martin PR; 19 James McKnight; 86 Robb Thomas; 88 Terrence Warren KR; **Tight ends (TE)**: 48 Carlester Crumpler; 82 Ferrell Edmunds; **87** Paul Green | **Offensive linemen (OL)**: 74 James Atkins T; **75** Howard Ballard T; **69** Jeff Blackshear G; **53** Ray Donaldson C; 76 Bill Hitchcock G; 78 Mike Keim T; **52** Kevin Mawae G; 71 Mike Moody T; 56 Joe Tofflemire C; **Defensive linemen (DL)**: 98 Sam Adams DE/DT; **67** Antonio Edwards DE; **96** Cortez Kennedy DT; 99 Michael McCrary DE; **72** Joe Nash DT; 70 Michael Sinclair DE; 61 Matt Werner DT | **Linebackers (LB)**: 51 David Brandon OLB; **97** Rufus Porter OLB; 58 Bob Spitulski MLB; **94** Rod Stephens MLB; 95 Dean Wells MLB; **90** Terry Wooden OLB; **Defensive backs (DB)**: **25** Robert Blackmon SS; 29 Tony Brown CB; 23 Forey Duckett CB/S; 27 Patrick Hunter CB; 34 Dion Lambert FS; 44 Dave McCloughan FS; 21 Rafael Robinson SS; 28 Del Speer SS; 24 Terry Taylor CB; **31** Orlando Watters CB; **Special teams (ST)**: 83 Trey Junkin LS; 4 John Kasay K; 14 Rick Tuten P | **Practice squad**: 49 Greg Schorp TE; **Reserve**: 15 Reggie Barrett WR (IR); 20 Jay Bellamy S (IR); 50 Duane Bickett LB (IR); 92 Mike Frier DT (NF-Ill.); **26** Carlton Gray CB (IR); 59 Mitch Frerotte G (IR); 64 Bobby Hamilton DE (IR); 47 Kirby Jackson CB (IR); 65 Mike Kegarise T (IR); **3** Rick Mirer QB (IR); 37 Nate Odomes CB (NF-Inj.); **73** Ray Roberts T (IR); **41** Eugene Robinson S (IR); 91 Tyrone Rodgers DT (IR); 36 Lamar Smith RB (NF-Inj.); **93** Brent Williams DE (IR); Rookies in italics 53 active, 16 reserve, 1 practice squad |

- Starters in bold.
- (*) Denotes players that were selected for the 1995 Pro Bowl.

== Schedule ==
=== Preseason ===
| Week | Date | Opponent | Result | Record | Venue | Recap |
|---|---|---|---|---|---|---|
| 1 | August 5 | at Indianapolis Colts | **L** 9–13 | 0–1 | RCA Dome | Recap |
| 2 | August 13 | Tampa Bay Buccaneers | **W** 29–6 | 1–1 | Husky Stadium | Recap |
| 3 | August 20 | Minnesota Vikings | **W** 30–19 | 2–1 | Husky Stadium | Recap |
| 4 | August 26 | at San Francisco 49ers | **L** 9–13 | 2–2 | Candlestick Park | Recap |

=== Regular season ===
By finishing in fifth place in 1993, Seattle plays the two NFC fifth-place finishers, the Redskins and Buccaneers, and two games against the other AFC fifth-place finisher, the Colts.

| Week | Date | Opponent | Result | Record | Game site | Recap |
|---|---|---|---|---|---|---|
| 1 | September 4 | at Washington Redskins | **W** 28–7 | 1–0 | RFK Stadium | Recap |
| 2 | September 11 | at **Los Angeles Raiders** | **W** 38–9 | 2–0 | Los Angeles Memorial Coliseum | Recap |
| 3 | September 18 | **San Diego Chargers** | **L** 10–24 | 2–1 | Husky Stadium | Recap |
| 4 | September 25 | Pittsburgh Steelers | **W** 30–13 | 3–1 | Husky Stadium | Recap |
| 5 | October 2 | at Indianapolis Colts | **L** 15–17 | 3–2 | RCA Dome | Recap |
| 6 | October 9 | **Denver Broncos** | **L** 9–16 | 3–3 | Husky Stadium | Recap |
| 7 | Bye | | | | | |
| 8 | October 23 | at **Kansas City Chiefs** | **L** 23–38 | 3–4 | Arrowhead Stadium | Recap |
| 9 | October 30 | at **San Diego Chargers** | **L** 15–35 | 3–5 | Jack Murphy Stadium | Recap |
| 10 | November 6 | Cincinnati Bengals | **L** 17–20 (OT) | 3–6 | Kingdome | Recap |
| 11 | November 13 | at **Denver Broncos** | **L** 10–17 | 3–7 | Mile High Stadium | Recap |
| 12 | November 20 | Tampa Bay Buccaneers | **W** 22–21 | 4–7 | Kingdome | Recap |
| 13 | November 27 | **Kansas City Chiefs** | **W** 10–9 | 5–7 | Kingdome | Recap |
| 14 | December 4 | Indianapolis Colts | **L** 19–31 | 5–8 | Kingdome | Recap |
| 15 | December 11 | at Houston Oilers | **W** 16–14 | 6–8 | Houston Astrodome | Recap |
| 16 | December 18 | **Los Angeles Raiders** | **L** 16–17 | 6–9 | Kingdome | Recap |
| 17 | December 24 | at Cleveland Browns | **L** 9–35 | 6–10 | Cleveland Stadium | Recap |
Note: Intra-division opponents are in **bold** text.

Source: 1994 NFL season results

== Standings ==
AFC West
| | W | L | T | PCT | PF | PA | STK |
|---|---|---|---|---|---|---|---|
| ^{(2)} San Diego Chargers | 11 | 5 | 0 | .688 | 381 | 306 | W2 |
| ^{(6)} Kansas City Chiefs | 9 | 7 | 0 | .563 | 319 | 298 | W2 |
| Los Angeles Raiders | 9 | 7 | 0 | .563 | 303 | 327 | L1 |
| Denver Broncos | 7 | 9 | 0 | .438 | 347 | 396 | L3 |
| Seattle Seahawks | 6 | 10 | 0 | .375 | 287 | 323 | L2 |

== Game summaries ==
=== Preseason ===
==== Week P1: at Indianapolis Colts ====
Preseason Week One: Seattle Seahawks at Indianapolis Colts – Game summary

| Quarter | 1 | 2 | 3 | 4 | Total |
|---|---|---|---|---|---|
| Seahawks | 3 | 0 | 3 | 3 | 9 |
| Colts | 3 | 3 | 0 | 7 | 13 |

at RCA Dome, Indianapolis

- Date: August 5
- Game time: 7:30 pm local
- Game weather: indoors
- Game attendance: 40,469
- Referee: Jerry Markbreit
- TV: KING
- Gamebook

==== Week P2: vs. Tampa Bay Buccaneers ====
Preseason Week Two: Seattle Seahawks vs. Tampa Bay Buccaneers – Game summary

| Quarter | 1 | 2 | 3 | 4 | Total |
|---|---|---|---|---|---|
| Buccaneers | 6 | 0 | 0 | 0 | 6 |
| Seahawks | 0 | 22 | 0 | 7 | 29 |

at Husky Stadium, Seattle

- Date: August 13
- Game time: 4:09 pm local
- Game weather: clear, 82 °F (28 °C), wind N 5 miles per hour (8.0 km/h)
- Game attendance: 43,633
- Referee: Red Cashion
- TV: KING
- Gamebook

==== Week P3: vs. Minnesota Vikings ====
Preseason Week Three: Seattle Seahawks vs. Minnesota Vikings – Game summary

| Quarter | 1 | 2 | 3 | 4 | Total |
|---|---|---|---|---|---|
| Vikings | 0 | 3 | 0 | 16 | 19 |
| Seahawks | 7 | 3 | 14 | 6 | 30 |

at Husky Stadium, Seattle

- Date: August 20
- Game time: 4:08 pm local
- Game weather: clear, 75 °F (24 °C), wind SW 12 miles per hour (19 km/h)
- Game attendance: 45,497
- Referee: Ron Blum
- TV announcers (KING): Don Poier & Sam Adkins
- Gamebook

==== Week P4: at San Francisco 49ers ====
Preseason Week Four: Seattle Seahawks at San Francisco 49ers – Game summary

| Quarter | 1 | 2 | 3 | 4 | Total |
|---|---|---|---|---|---|
| Seahawks | 0 | 6 | 3 | 0 | 9 |
| 49ers | 7 | 3 | 3 | 0 | 13 |

at Candlestick Park, San Francisco

- Date: August 26
- Game time: 6:04 pm local
- Game weather: overcast, 65 °F (18 °C), 65% humidity, wind NW 25 miles per hour (40 km/h)
- Game attendance: 54,004
- Referee: Howard Roe
- TV: KING
- Gamebook

=== Regular season ===
==== Week 1: at Washington Redskins ====
Week One: Seattle Seahawks at Washington Redskins – Game summary

| Quarter | 1 | 2 | 3 | 4 | Total |
|---|---|---|---|---|---|
| Seahawks | 7 | 14 | 7 | 0 | 28 |
| Redskins | 7 | 0 | 0 | 0 | 7 |

at RFK Stadium, Washington, D.C.

- Date: September 4
- Game time: 1:01 pm local
- Game weather: partly cloudy, 68 °F (20 °C), 42% humidity, wind NE 15 miles per hour (24 km/h)
- Game attendance: 52,930
- Referee: Dale Hamer
- TV announcers (NBC): Charlie Jones & Randy Cross
- Gamebook

Game information

First quarter

- WAS – Desmond Howard 27-yard pass from John Friesz (Chip Lohmiller kick), 11:06 (WAS 7–0)
- SEA – Chris Warren 12-yard run (John Kasay kick), 6:53 (Tied 7–7)

Second quarter

- SEA – Terry Wooden 69-yard interception return (John Kasay kick), 10:07 (SEA 14–7)
- SEA – Brian Blades 5-yard pass from Rick Mirer (John Kasay kick), 0:11 (SEA 21–7)

Third quarter

- SEA – Chris Warren 12-yard run (John Kasay kick), 3:46 (SEA 28–7)

Fourth quarter

- No scoring plays

Top passers

- SEA – Rick Mirer: 17/30, 183 yds, 1 TD
- WAS – John Friesz: 17/32, 210 yds, 1 TD, 2 INT

Top rushers

- SEA – Chris Warren: 22 car, 100 yds, 2 TD
- WAS – Reggie Brooks: 12 car, 31 yds

Top receivers

- SEA – Kelvin Martin: 4 rec, 59 yds
- WAS – Henry Ellard: 7 rec, 105 yds

Team – pass – rush – total – to

- SEA – 176 – 184 – 360 – 0
- WAS – 224 – 34 – 258 – 3

==== Week 2: at Los Angeles Raiders ====
Week Two: Seattle Seahawks at Los Angeles Raiders – Game summary

| Quarter | 1 | 2 | 3 | 4 | Total |
|---|---|---|---|---|---|
| Seahawks | 7 | 3 | 14 | 14 | 38 |
| Raiders | 3 | 0 | 0 | 6 | 9 |

at Los Angeles Memorial Coliseum, Los Angeles

- Date: September 11
- Game time: 1:06 pm local
- Game weather: clear, 86 °F (30 °C), 65% humidity, wind W 5 miles per hour (8.0 km/h)
- Game attendance: 47,319
- Referee: Dick Hantak
- TV announcers (NBC): Charlie Jones & Randy Cross
- Gamebook

Game information

First quarter

- SEA – Chris Warren 4-yard run (John Kasay kick), 10:05 (SEA 7–0)
- LA – Jeff Jaeger 26-yard field goal, 2:04 (SEA 7–3)

Second quarter

- SEA – John Kasay 33-yard field goal, 7:31 (SEA 10–3)

Third quarter

- SEA – Brian Blades 5-yard pass from Rick Mirer (John Kasay kick), 5:47 (SEA 17–3)
- SEA – Michael Bates 40-yard pass from Rick Mirer (John Kasay kick), 0:57 (SEA 24–3)

Fourth quarter

- SEA – Chris Warren 38-yard pass from Rick Mirer (John Kasay kick), 10:44 (SEA 31–3)
- LA – Terry McDaniel 41-yard fumble return (PAT failed), 6:38 (SEA 31–9)
- SEA – Tracy Johnson 2-yard run (John Kasay kick), 2:32 (SEA 38–9)

Top passers

- SEA – Rick Mirer: 19/26, 242 yds, 3 TD
- LA – Jeff Hostetler: 17/36, 181 yds, 3 INT

Top rushers

- SEA – Chris Warren: 21 car, 62 yds, 1 TD
- LA – Harvey Williams: 5 car, 30 yds

Top receivers

- SEA – Kelvin Martin: 5 rec, 52 yds
- LA – Rocket Ismail: 6 rec, 77 yds

Team – pass – rush – total – to

- SEA – 235 – 97 – 332 – 1
- LA – 198 – 99 – 297 – 4

==== Week 3: vs. San Diego Chargers ====
Week Three: Seattle Seahawks vs. San Diego Chargers – Game summary

| Quarter | 1 | 2 | 3 | 4 | Total |
|---|---|---|---|---|---|
| Chargers | 0 | 10 | 14 | 0 | 24 |
| Seahawks | 0 | 3 | 0 | 7 | 10 |

at Husky Stadium, Seattle

- Date: September 18
- Game time: 1:02 pm local
- Game weather: clear, 78 °F (26 °C), 68% humidity, wind NW 7 miles per hour (11 km/h)
- Game attendance: 65,536
- Referee: Jerry Markbreit
- TV announcers (NBC): Jim Lampley & Todd Christensen
- Gamebook

Game information

First quarter

- No scoring plays

Second quarter

- SEA – John Kasay 39-yard field goal, 13:00 (SEA 3–0)
- SD – John Carney 36-yard field goal, 7:11 (Tied 3–3)
- SD – Natrone Means 1-yard run (John Carney kick), 0:19 (SD 10–3)

Third quarter

- SD – Stanley Richard 73-yard interception return (John Carney kick), 6:28 (SD 17–3)
- SD – Tony Martin 99-yard pass from Stan Humphries (John Carney kick), 1:55 (SD 24–3)

Fourth quarter

- SEA – Chris Warren 11-yard run (John Kasay kick), 9:49 (SD 24–10)

Top passers

- SD – Stan Humphries: 19/29, 262 yds, 1 TD
- SEA – Rick Mirer: 20/36, 163 yds, 1 INT

Top rushers

- SD – Natrone Means: 24 car, 86 yds, 1 TD
- SEA – Chris Warren: 14 car, 55 yds, 1 TD

Top receivers

- SD – Tony Martin: 6 rec, 152 yds, 1 TD
- SEA – Brian Blades: 8 rec, 66 yds

Team – pass – rush – total – to

- SD – 251 – 95 – 346 – 2
- SEA – 128– 59 – 187 – 2

==== Week 4: vs. Pittsburgh Steelers ====
Week Four: Seattle Seahawks vs. Pittsburgh Steelers – Game summary

| Quarter | 1 | 2 | 3 | 4 | Total |
|---|---|---|---|---|---|
| Steelers | 3 | 3 | 0 | 7 | 13 |
| Seahawks | 7 | 13 | 0 | 10 | 30 |

at Husky Stadium, Seattle

- Date: September 25
- Game time: 3:04 pm local
- Game weather: clear, 78 °F (26 °C), 68% humidity, wind NW 10 miles per hour (16 km/h)
- Game attendance: 59,637
- Referee: Red Cashion
- TV announcers (NBC): Don Criqui & Todd Christensen
- Gamebook

Game information

First quarter

- SEA – Chris Warren 3-yard run (John Kasay kick), 12:22 (SEA 7–0)
- PIT – Gary Anderson 31-yard field goal, 6:03 (SEA 7–3)

Second quarter

- SEA – John Kasay 31-yard field goal, 9:46 (SEA 10–3)
- SEA – Trey Junkin 1-yard pass from Rick Mirer (John Kasay kick), 6:20 (SEA 17–3)
- SEA – John Kasay 40-yard field goal, 0:46 (SEA 20–3)
- PIT – Gary Anderson 38-yard field goal, 0:00 (SEA 20–6)

Third quarter

- No scoring plays

Fourth quarter

- SEA – Orlando Watters 35-yard interception return (John Kasay kick), 4:15 (SEA 27–6)
- PIT – Charles Johnson 36-yard pass from Neil O'Donnell (Gary Anderson kick), 3:17 (SEA 27–13)
- SEA – John Kasay 31-yard field goal, 1:06 (SEA 30–13)

Top passers

- PIT – Neil O'Donnell: 31/43, 282 yds, 1 TD, 4 INT
- SEA – Rick Mirer: 14/24, 166 yds, 1 TD, 1 INT

Top rushers

- PIT – Barry Foster: 21 car, 96 yds
- SEA – Chris Warren: 26 car, 126 yds, 1 TD

Top receivers

- PIT – Charles Johnson: 7 rec, 99 yds, 1 TD
- SEA – Brian Blades: 4 rec, 97 yds

Team – pass – rush – total – to

- PIT – 321 – 131 – 452 – 4
- SEA – 152 – 145 – 297 – 1

==== Week 5: at Indianapolis Colts ====
Week Five: Seattle Seahawks at Indianapolis Colts – Game summary

| Quarter | 1 | 2 | 3 | 4 | Total |
|---|---|---|---|---|---|
| Seahawks | 5 | 3 | 0 | 7 | 15 |
| Colts | 10 | 0 | 7 | 0 | 17 |

at RCA Dome, Indianapolis

- Date: October 2
- Game time: 12:01 pm local
- Game weather: indoors
- Game attendance: 49,876
- Referee: Howard Roe
- TV announcers (NBC): Tom Hammond & Cris Collinsworth
- Gamebook

Game information

First quarter

- SEA – John Kasay 42-yard field goal, 12:08 (SEA 3–0)
- IND – Dean Biasucci 45-yard field goal, 7:28 (Tied 3–3)
- SEA – Safety, Jim Harbaugh intentional grounding in end zone, 5:18 (SEA 5–3)
- IND – Marshall Faulk 5-yard run (Dean Biasucci kick), 1:21 (IND 10–5)

Second quarter

- SEA – John Kasay 45-yard field goal, 0:12 (IND 10–8)

Third quarter

- IND – Marshall Faulk 1-yard run (Dean Biasucci kick), 5:49 (IND 17–8)

Fourth quarter

- SEA – Kelvin Martin 30-yard pass from Rick Mirer (John Kasay kick), 14:22 (IND 17–15)

Top passers

- SEA – Rick Mirer: 20/38, 186 yds, 1 TD, 1 INT
- IND – Jim Harbaugh: 15/27, 181 yds

Top rushers

- SEA – Chris Warren: 23 car, 81 yds
- IND – Marshall Faulk: 26 car, 90 yds, 2 TD

Top receivers

- SEA – Kelvin Martin: 8 rec, 104 yds, 1 TD
- IND – Sean Dawkins: 5 rec, 99 yds

Team – pass – rush – total – to

- SEA – 174 – 102 – 276 – 1
- IND – 168 – 119 – 287 – 1

==== Week 6: vs. Denver Broncos ====
Week Six: Seattle Seahawks vs. Denver Broncos – Game summary

| Quarter | 1 | 2 | 3 | 4 | Total |
|---|---|---|---|---|---|
| Broncos | 3 | 7 | 6 | 0 | 16 |
| Seahawks | 0 | 3 | 3 | 3 | 9 |

at Husky Stadium, Seattle

- Date: October 9
- Game time: 1:01 pm local
- Game weather: high clouds, 64 °F (18 °C), 71% humidity, wind NW 7 miles per hour (11 km/h)
- Game attendance: 63,872
- Referee: Bernie Kukar
- TV announcers (NBC): Don Criqui & Cris Collinsworth
- Gamebook

Game information

First quarter

- DEN – Jason Elam 26-yard field goal, 3:50 (DEN 3–0)

Second quarter

- SEA – John Kasay 37-yard field goal, 4:01 (Tied 3–3)
- DEN – John Elway 2-yard run (Jason Elam kick), 0:43 (DEN 10–3)

Third quarter

- SEA – John Kasay 36-yard field goal, 9:02 (DEN 10–6)
- DEN – Jason Elam 33-yard field goal, 4:14 (DEN 13–6)
- DEN – Jason Elam 37-yard field goal, 3:08 (DEN 16–6)

Fourth quarter

- SEA – John Kasay 42-yard field goal, 9:23 (DEN 16–9)

Top passers

- DEN – John Elway: 15/29, 146 yds
- SEA – Rick Mirer: 19/39, 244 yds, 2 INT

Top rushers

- DEN – Leonard Russell: 24 car, 103 yds
- SEA – Chris Warren: 18 car, 80 yds

Top receivers

- DEN – Shannon Sharpe: 7 rec, 87 yds
- SEA – Brian Blades: 6 rec, 90 yds

Team – pass – rush – total – to

- DEN – 128 – 150 – 278 – 0
- SEA – 244 – 94 – 338 – 5

==== Week 8: at Kansas City Chiefs ====
Week Eight: Seattle Seahawks at Kansas City Chiefs – Game summary

| Quarter | 1 | 2 | 3 | 4 | Total |
|---|---|---|---|---|---|
| Seahawks | 0 | 0 | 7 | 16 | 23 |
| Chiefs | 0 | 13 | 8 | 17 | 38 |

at Arrowhead Stadium, Kansas City, Missouri

- Date: October 23
- Game time: 12:01 pm local
- Game weather: clear, 63 °F (17 °C), 56% humidity, wind W 5 miles per hour (8.0 km/h)
- Game attendance: 78,847
- Referee: Dale Hamer
- TV announcers (NBC): Marv Albert & Paul Maguire
- Gamebook

Game information

First quarter

- No scoring plays

Second quarter

- KC – Kimble Anders 9-yard pass from Joe Montana (Lin Elliott kick), 7:48 (KC 7–0)
- KC – Lin Elliott 49-yard field goal, 6:27 (KC 10–0)
- KC – Lin Elliott 34-yard field goal, 0:20 (KC 13–0)

Third quarter

- SEA – Jon Vaughn 3-yard run (John Kasay kick), 8:34 (KC 13–7)
- KC – Marcus Allen 36-yard run (2-pt PAT: Marcus Allen run), 2:43 (KC 21–7)

Fourth quarter

- KC – Lake Dawson 21-yard pass from Joe Montana (Lin Elliott kick), 14:15 (KC 28–7)
- KC – Lin Elliott 27-yard field goal, 8:52 (KC 31–7)
- SEA – Brian Blades 1-yard pass from Rick Mirer (2-pt PAT: Brian Blades pass from Rick Mirer), 5:50 (KC 31–15)
- KC – Eric Martin 32-yard pass from Steve Bono (Lin Elliott kick), 4:31 (KC 38–15)
- SEA – Brian Blades 9-yard pass from Rick Mirer (2-pt PAT: Jon Vaughn run), 2:12 (KC 38–23)

Top passers

- SEA – Rick Mirer: 15/30, 126 yds, 2 TD
- KC – Joe Montana: 21/31, 270 yds, 2 TD

Top rushers

- SEA – Chris Warren: 19 car, 117 yds
- KC – Marcus Allen: 14 car, 77 yds, 1 TD

Top receivers

- SEA – Brian Blades: 7 rec, 61 yds, 2 TD
- KC – Lake Dawson: 5 rec, 93 yds, 1 TD

Team – pass – rush – total – to

- SEA – 96 – 167 – 263 – 2
- KC – 305 – 172 – 477 – 0

==== Week 9: at San Diego Chargers ====
Week Nine: Seattle Seahawks at San Diego Chargers – Game summary

| Quarter | 1 | 2 | 3 | 4 | Total |
|---|---|---|---|---|---|
| Seahawks | 0 | 7 | 0 | 8 | 15 |
| Chargers | 0 | 14 | 7 | 14 | 35 |

at San Diego Stadium, San Diego, California

- Date: October 30
- Game time: 1:01 pm local
- Game weather: clear, 69 °F (21 °C), 61% humidity, wind WSW 11 miles per hour (18 km/h)
- Game attendance: 59,001
- Referee: Ed Hochuli
- TV announcers (NBC): Tom Hammond & Cris Collinsworth
- Gamebook

Game information

First quarter

- No scoring plays

Second quarter

- SEA – Chris Warren 9-yard run (John Kasay kick), 12:41 (SEA 7–0)
- SD – John Carney 25-yard field goal, 7:14 (SEA 7–3)
- SD – John Carney 39-yard field goal, 1:45 (SEA 7–6)
- SD – Ronnie Harmon 15-yard run (John Carney kick), 1:15 (SD 13–7)

Third quarter

- SD – Natrone Means 15-yard run (2-pt PAT: Ronnie Harmon pass from Stan Humphries), 10:21 (SD 21–7)

Fourth quarter

- SD – Alfred Pupunu 8-yard pass from Gale Gilbert (John Carney kick), 11:43 (SD 28–7)
- SD – Tony Martin 16-yard pass from Gale Gilbert (John Carney kick), 1:46 (SD 35–7)
- SEA – Jon Vaughn 93-yard kickoff return (2-pt PAT: Chris Warren run), 1:28 (SD 35–15)

Top passers

- SEA – Rick Mirer: 15/30, 177 yds
- SD – Gale Gilbert: 11/14, 125 yds, 2 TD, 1 INT

Top rushers

- SEA – Chris Warren: 17 car, 92 yds, 1 TD
- SD – Natrone Means: 26 car, 104 yds, 1 TD

Top receivers

- SEA – Brian Blades: 6 rec, 189 yds
- SD – Ronnie Harmon: 3 rec, 60 yds

Team – pass – rush – total – to

- SEA – 171 – 112 – 283 – 2
- SD – 187 – 161 – 348 – 1

==== Week 10: vs. Cincinnati Bengals ====
Week Ten: Seattle Seahawks vs. Cincinnati Bengals – Game summary

| Quarter | 1 | 2 | 3 | 4 | OT | Total |
|---|---|---|---|---|---|---|
| Bengals | 5 | 3 | 3 | 6 | 3 | 20 |
| Seahawks | 7 | 0 | 3 | 7 | 0 | 17 |

at Kingdome, Seattle

- Date: November 6
- Game time: 1:01 pm local
- Game weather: indoors
- Game attendance: 46,630
- Referee: Ron Blum
- TV announcers (NBC): Mike Bush & Beasley Reece
- Gamebook

Game information

First quarter

- SEA – Tracy Johnson 1-yard run (John Kasay kick), 10:51 (SEA 7–0)
- CIN – Safety, Alfred Williams tackled Rick Mirer in end zone, 6:08 (SEA 7–2)
- CIN – Doug Pelfrey 36-yard field goal, 0:28 (SEA 7–5)

Second quarter

- CIN – Doug Pelfrey 44-yard field goal, 0:00 (CIN 8–7)

Third quarter

- CIN – Doug Pelfrey 36-yard field goal, 6:37 (CIN 11–7)
- SEA – John Kasay 23-yard field goal, 2:38 (CIN 11–10)

Fourth quarter

- CIN – Doug Pelfrey 47-yard field goal, 13:12 (CIN 14–10)
- SEA – Steve Smith 1-yard run (John Kasay kick), 9:07 (SEA 17–14)
- CIN – Doug Pelfrey 28-yard field goal, 4:27 (Tied 17–17)

Overtime

- CIN – Doug Pelfrey 26-yard field goal, 6:46 (CIN 20–17)

Top passers

- CIN – Jeff Blake: 31/43, 387 yds, 0 INT
- SEA – Rick Mirer: 13/32, 181 yds

Top rushers

- CIN – Derrick Fenner: 15 car, 49 yds
- SEA – Chris Warren: 24 car, 92 yds

Top receivers

- CIN – Darnay Scott: 7 rec, 157 yds
- SEA – Brian Blades: 4 rec, 85 yds

Team – pass – rush – total – to

- CIN – 377 – 119 – 496 – 2
- SEA –170 – 148 – 318 – 1

==== Week 11 at Denver Broncos ====
Week Eleven: Seattle Seahawks at Denver Broncos – Game summary

| Quarter | 1 | 2 | 3 | 4 | Total |
|---|---|---|---|---|---|
| Seahawks | 0 | 0 | 3 | 7 | 10 |
| Broncos | 0 | 7 | 3 | 7 | 17 |

at Mile High Stadium, Denver, Colorado

- Date: November 13
- Game time: 2:01 pm local
- Game weather: partly cloudy, 52 °F (11 °C), 22% humidity, wind S 5 miles per hour (8.0 km/h)
- Game attendance: 71,290
- Referee: Larry Nemmers
- TV announcers (NBC): Dan Hicks & Bob Golic
- Gamebook

Game information

First quarter

- No scoring plays

Second quarter

- DEN – John Elway 12-yard run (Jason Elam kick), 8:41 (DEN 7–0)

Third quarter

- DEN – Jason Elam 19-yard field goal, 4:46 (DEN 10–0)
- SEA – John Kasay 19-yard field goal, 1:58 (DEN 10–3)

Fourth quarter

- SEA – Chris Warren 23-yard run (John Kasay kick), 11:39 (Tied 10–10)
- DEN – Leonard Russell 11-yard run (Jason Elam kick), 5:43 (DEN 17–10)

Top passers

- SEA – Rick Mirer: 10/29, 133 yds
- DEN – John Elway: 17/32, 146 yds, 2 INT

Top rushers

- SEA – Chris Warren: 18 car, 122 yds, 1 TD
- DEN – Leonard Russell: 19 car, 109 yds, 1 TD

Top receivers

- SEA – Chris Warren: 4 rec, 78 yds
- DEN – Anthony Miller: 2 rec, 35 yds

Team – pass – rush – total – to

- SEA – 131 – 158 – 289 – 1
- DEN – 128 – 169 – 297 – 2

==== Week 12: vs. Tampa Bay Buccaneers ====
Week Twelve: Seattle Seahawks vs. Tampa Bay Buccaneers – Game summary

| Quarter | 1 | 2 | 3 | 4 | Total |
|---|---|---|---|---|---|
| Buccaneers | 0 | 7 | 3 | 11 | 21 |
| Seahawks | 7 | 8 | 0 | 7 | 22 |

at Kingdome, Seattle

- Date: November 20
- Game time: 1:01 pm local
- Game weather: indoors
- Game attendance: 37,466
- Referee: Jerry Markbreit
- TV announcers (Fox): Mike Breen & Merril Hoge
- Gamebook

Game information

First quarter

- SEA – Chris Warren 3-yard pass from Rick Mirer (John Kasay kick), 10:09 (SEA 7–0)

Second quarter

- SEA – Jon Vaughn 5-yard pass from Rick Mirer (2-pt PAT: Rick Tuten run), 12:43 (SEA 15–0)
- TB – Courtney Hawkins 2-yard pass from Craig Erickson (Michael Husted kick), 0:33 (SEA 15–7)

Third quarter

- TB – Michael Husted 30-yard field goal, 10:01 (SEA 15–10)

Fourth quarter

- TB – Courtney Hawkins 13-yard pass from Craig Erickson (2-pt PAT: Errict Rhett run), 12:20 (TB 18–15)
- TB – Michael Husted 35-yard field goal, 3:24 (TB 21–15)
- SEA – Mack Strong 7-yard run (John Kasay kick), 0:42 (SEA 22–21)

Top passers

- TB – Craig Erickson: 22/32, 212 yds, 2 TD, 1 INT
- SEA – Rick Mirer: 13/25, 127 yds, 2 TD, 1 INT

Top rushers

- TB – Errict Rhett: 24 car, 111 yds
- SEA – Chris Warren: 16 car, 116 yds

Top receivers

- TB – Lawrence Dawsey: 6 rec, 63 yds
- SEA – Brian Blades: 5 rec, 58 yds

Team – pass – rush – total – to

- TB – 212 – 120 – 332 – 2
- SEA – 117 – 177 – 294 – 3

==== Week 13: vs. Kansas City Chiefs ====
Week Thirteen: Seattle Seahawks vs. Kansas City Chiefs – Game summary

| Quarter | 1 | 2 | 3 | 4 | Total |
|---|---|---|---|---|---|
| Chiefs | 3 | 3 | 0 | 3 | 9 |
| Seahawks | 0 | 0 | 0 | 10 | 10 |

at Kingdome, Seattle

- Date: November 27
- Game time: 1:01 pm local
- Game weather: indoors
- Game attendance: 54,120
- Referee: Ed Hochuli
- TV announcers (NBC): Tom Hammond & Cris Collinsworth
- Gamebook

Game information

First quarter

- KC – Lin Elliott 32-yard field goal, 7:06 (KC 3–0)

Second quarter

- KC – Lin Elliott 23-yard field goal, 8:43 (KC 6–0)

Third quarter

- No scoring plays

Fourth quarter

- SEA – Steve Smith 2-yard run (John Kasay kick), 13:02 (SEA 7–6)
- KC – Lin Elliott 38-yard field goal, 7:27 (KC 9–7)
- SEA – John Kasay 32-yard field goal, 1:42 (SEA 10–9)

Top passers

- KC – Joe Montana: 19/35, 163 yds
- SEA – Rick Mirer: 15/31, 195 yds

Top rushers

- KC – Donnell Bennett: 8 car, 42 yds
- SEA – Chris Warren: 22 car, 53 yds

Top receivers

- KC – Lake Dawson: 8 rec, 66 yds
- SEA – Brian Blades: 7 rec, 141 yds

Team – pass – rush – total – to

- KC – 197 – 115 – 312 – 2
- SEA – 207 – 59 – 266 – 0

==== Week 14: vs. Indianapolis Colts ====
Week Fourteen: Seattle Seahawks vs. Indianapolis Colts – Game summary

| Quarter | 1 | 2 | 3 | 4 | Total |
|---|---|---|---|---|---|
| Colts | 7 | 7 | 7 | 10 | 31 |
| Seahawks | 10 | 3 | 0 | 6 | 19 |

at Kingdome, Seattle

- Date: December 4
- Game time: 1:03 pm local
- Game weather: indoors
- Game attendance: 39,574
- Referee: Johnny Grier
- TV announcers (NBC): Dan Hicks, Todd Christensen & Jim Gray
- Gamebook

Game information

First quarter

- SEA – John Kasay 37-yard field goal, 3:33 (SEA 3–0)
- SEA – Paul Green 18-yard pass from Rick Mirer (John Kasay kick), 3:22 (SEA 10–0)
- IND – Marshall Faulk 45-yard run (Dean Biasucci kick), 0:42 (SEA 10–7)

Second quarter

- IND – Ray Buchanan 37-yard interception return (Dean Biasucci kick), 6:54 (IND 14–10)
- SEA – John Kasay 31-yard field goal, 0:43 (SEA 14–13)

Third quarter

- IND – Don Majkowski 1-yard run (Dean Biasucci kick), 8:01 (IND 21–13)

Fourth quarter

- IND – Sean Dawkins 16-yard pass from Don Majkowski (Dean Biasucci kick), 10:20 (IND 28–13)
- IND – Dean Biasucci 21-yard field goal, 8:03 (IND 31–13)
- SEA – Steve Smith 1-yard pass from Dan McGwire (PAT failed), 1:44 (IND 31–19)

Top passers

- IND – Don Majkowski: 10/19, 105 yds, 1 TD, 2 INT
- SEA – Dan McGwire: 15/24, 145 yds, 1 TD, 1 INT

Top rushers

- IND – Marshall Faulk: 27 car, 129 yds, 1 TD
- SEA – Chris Warren: 23 car, 81 yds

Top receivers

- IND – Sean Dawkins: 3 rec, 42 yds, 1 TD
- SEA – Brian Blades: 4 rec, 55 yds
- SEA – Robb Thomas: 3 rec, 55 yds

Team – pass – rush – total – to

- IND – 105 – 183 – 288 – 4
- SEA – 131 – 107 – 238 – 5

==== Week 15: at Houston Oilers ====
Week Fifteen: Seattle Seahawks at Houston Oilers – Game summary

| Quarter | 1 | 2 | 3 | 4 | Total |
|---|---|---|---|---|---|
| Seahawks | 3 | 7 | 6 | 0 | 16 |
| Oilers | 0 | 0 | 0 | 14 | 14 |

at Astrodome, Houston, Texas

- Date: December 11
- Game time: 3:02 pm local
- Game weather: indoors
- Game attendance: 31,453
- Referee: Gordon McCarter
- TV announcers (NBC): Jim Lampley & Todd Christensen
- Gamebook

Game information

First quarter

- SEA – John Kasay 40-yard field goal, 13:23 (SEA 3–0)

Second quarter

- SEA – Chris Warren 33-yard run (John Kasay kick), 12:34 (SEA 10–0)

Third quarter

- SEA – Mack Strong 13-yard run (PAT failed), 11:33 (SEA 16–0)

Fourth quarter

- HOU – Webster Slaughter 36-yard pass from Billy Joe Tolliver (2-pt PAT: Haywood Jeffires pass from Billy Joe Tolliver), 4:23 (SEA 16–8)
- HOU – Ernest Givins 78-yard punt return (PAT failed), 2:53 (SEA 16–14)

Top passers

- SEA – Dan McGwire: 8/17, 95 yds
- HOU – Billy Joe Tolliver: 16/29, 184 yds, 1 TD, 1 INT

Top rushers

- SEA – Chris Warren: 30 car, 185 yds, 1 TD
- HOU – Lorenzo White: 17 car, 53 yds

Top receivers

- SEA – Steve Smith: 2 rec, 32 yds
- HOU – Webster Slaughter: 5 rec, 66 yds, 1 TD

Team – pass – rush – total – to

- SEA – 64 – 266 – 330 – 1
- HOU – 145 – 63 – 208 – 2

==== Week 16: vs. Los Angeles Raiders ====
Week Sixteen: Seattle Seahawks vs. Los Angeles Raiders – Game summary

| Quarter | 1 | 2 | 3 | 4 | Total |
|---|---|---|---|---|---|
| Raiders | 0 | 10 | 0 | 7 | 17 |
| Seahawks | 0 | 10 | 3 | 3 | 16 |

at Kingdome, Seattle

- Date: December 18
- Game time: 5:05 pm local
- Game weather: indoors
- Game attendance: 53,301
- Referee: Bernie Kukar
- TV announcers (ESPN): Mike Patrick, Joe Theismann & Mark Malone
- Gamebook

Game information

First quarter

- No scoring plays

Second quarter

- LA – Harvey Williams 5-yard run (Jeff Jaeger kick), 13:38 (LA 7–0)
- SEA – John Kasay 41-yard field goal, 9:42 (LA 7–3)
- LA – Jeff Jaeger 24-yard field goal, 5:20 (LA 10–3)
- SEA – Chris Warren 33-yard run (John Kasay kick), 1:00 (Tied 10–10)

Third quarter

- SEA – John Kasay 50-yard field goal, 8:47 (SEA 13–10)

Fourth quarter

- SEA – John Kasay 33-yard field goal, 9:35 (SEA 16–10)
- LA – Tim Brown 77-yard pass from Jeff Hostetler (Jeff Jaeger kick), 9:13 (LA 17–16)

Top passers

- LA – Jeff Hostetler: 17/29, 235 yds, 1 TD
- SEA – Dan McGwire: 19/35, 250 yds, 1 TD, 2 INT

Top rushers

- LA – Harvey Williams: 20 car, 93 yds, 1 TD
- SEA – Chris Warren: 24 car, 122 yds, 1 TD

Top receivers

- LA – Tim Brown: 4 rec, 107 yds, 1 TD
- SEA – Brian Blades: 5 rec, 70 yds

Team – pass – rush – total – to

- LA – 206 – 116 – 322 – 0
- SEA – 155 – 125 – 280 – 0

==== Week 17: at Cleveland Browns ====
Week Seventeen: Seattle Seahawks at Cleveland Browns – Game summary

| Quarter | 1 | 2 | 3 | 4 | Total |
|---|---|---|---|---|---|
| Seahawks | 0 | 0 | 3 | 6 | 9 |
| Browns | 7 | 14 | 7 | 7 | 35 |

at Cleveland Stadium, Cleveland, Ohio

- Date: December 24
- Game time: 1:00 pm local
- Game weather: cloudy, 41 °F (5 °C), 91% humidity, wind N 20 miles per hour (32 km/h)
- Game attendance: 54,180
- Referee: Gary Lane
- TV announcers (NBC): Dan Hicks & Cris Collinsworth
- Gamebook

Game information

First quarter

- CLE – Eric Metcalf 22-yard run (Matt Stover kick), 8:38 (CLE 3–0)

Second quarter

- CLE – Mark Carrier 35-yard pass from Vinny Testaverde (Matt Stover kick), 10:38 (CLE 14–0)
- CLE – Vinny Testaverde 1-yard run (Matt Stover kick), 2:15 (CLE 21–0)

Third quarter

- SEA – John Kasay 30-yard field goal, 11:28 (CLE 21–3)
- CLE – Derrick Alexander 3-yard pass from Vinny Testaverde (Matt Stover kick), 4:14 (CLE 28–3)

Fourth quarter

- CLE – Mark Carrier 14-yard run (Matt Stover kick), 11:51 (CLE 35–3)
- SEA – James McKnight 25-yard pass from Stan Gelbaugh (PAT failed), 1:22 (CLE 35–9)

Top passers

- SEA – Dan McGwire: 11/26, 149 yds, 1 INT
- CLE – Vinny Testaverde: 16/21, 228 yds, 2 TD, 1 INT

Top rushers

- SEA – Chris Warren: 16 car, 61 yds
- CLE – Leroy Hoard: 24 car, 74 yds

Top receivers

- SEA – Brian Blades: 6 rec, 80 yds
- CLE – Mark Carrier: 5 rec, 98 yds, 1 TD

Team – pass – rush – total – to

- SEA – 217 – 84 – 301 – 3
- CLE – 245 – 106 – 245 – 1
