= Eugene Robinson (American football) =

American football player (born 1963)

No. 41
- Position: Safety

Personal information
- Born: May 28, 1963 (age 63); Hartford, Connecticut, U.S.
- Listed height: 6 ft 0 in (1.83 m)
- Listed weight: 186 lb (84 kg)

Career information
- High school: Hartford (CT) Weaver
- College: Colgate
- NFL draft: 1985: undrafted

Career history
- Seattle Seahawks (1985–1995); Green Bay Packers (1996–1997); Atlanta Falcons (1998–1999); Carolina Panthers (2000)

Awards and highlights
- Super Bowl champion (XXXI); Second-team All-Pro (1993); 3× Pro Bowl (1992, 1993, 1998); NFL interceptions leader (1993); Seattle Seahawks 35th Anniversary team; Seattle Seahawks Top 50 players

Career NFL statistics
- Tackles: 1,415
- Interceptions: 57
- Sacks: 7.5
- Stats at Pro Football Reference

Eugene Keefe Robinson (born May 28, 1963) is an American former professional football safety who played in the National Football League (NFL) for 16 seasons. He spent the majority of his career with the Seattle Seahawks, who signed him as an undrafted free agent in 1985. In addition to his 11 seasons with the Seahawks, he was a member of the Green Bay Packers and Atlanta Falcons for two seasons each and the Carolina Panthers for one season.

During his Seattle tenure, Robinson was named to two Pro Bowls and led the league in interceptions in 1993. Robinson's two seasons with the Packers saw him reach the Super Bowl in both years and win Super Bowl XXXI. With the Falcons, he earned a third Pro Bowl selection and made a third consecutive Super Bowl appearance.

== College career ==
During high school, Robinson was not a sought after recruit and did not receive any major scholarship offers. He was interested in attending Colgate although they did not offer athletic scholarships and were known for their academics. When he inquired about joining their football program as a walk-on, Colgate wouldn't guarantee he'd receive a roster spot, but did guarantee he'd at least receive a tryout. He began attending Colgate University in 1981 and successfully joined the football team as a walk-on. While attending, Robinson also was part of their wrestling team and worked a part-time job at McDonald's to pay his tuition. He became a starter during his sophomore year in 1982. During his sophomore and junior seasons, he was limited to 34 combined tackles and one interception. As a senior, he remained a starting defensive back and recorded 52 combined tackles and two interceptions throughout the 1984 season.

== Professional career ==
During the NFL Scouting Combine, Robinson ran a 4.66s in the 40-yard dash. The New Jersey Generals selected Robinson during the 1985 USFL territorial draft. He attended training camp with the New Jersey Generals of the USFL, but opted to attend the tryout with the Seahawks.

=== Seattle Seahawks ===
Robinson went undrafted in the 1985 NFL draft, but was invited by the Seattle Seahawks to tryout during spring minicamp. At the conclusion of spring minicamp, the Seahawks invited him to participate at training camp. His versatility as a defensive back capable of playing both cornerback and safety significantly allowed him to quickly garner experience as it also coincided with cornerback Dave Brown's absence at training camp due to a contract holdout.

==== 1985 season ====
On June 4, 1985, the Seattle Seahawks signed Robinson as an undrafted free agent. On September 4, 1985, Robinson made the Seahawks' opening day roster as one of only three rookies to make it through their final roster cuts. Head coach Chuck Knox named Robinson a backup safety to begin the season and primarily used him on special teams. He was listed as a backup safety on the depth chart behind starting tandem Kenny Easley and John Harris and primary backup Paul Moyer.

On September 8, 1985, Robinson made his professional regular season debut in the Seahawks' season-opener at the Cincinnati Bengals as they won 28—24. On October 6, 1985, Robinson made one solo tackle, a pass deflection, and had his first career interception on a pass attempt by Mark Herrman during a 21—26 win against the San Diego Chargers. In Week 16, he set a season-high with nine combined tackles (six solo) and had a pass deflection during a 24—27 loss to the Denver Broncos. On December 1, 1985, Robinson recorded three combined tackles (one solo), set a season-high with two pass deflections, and intercepted a pass attempt by Todd Blackledge to wide receiver Stephone Paige as the Seahawks routed the Kansas City Chiefs 6—24. He finished his rookie season with 28 combined tackles (18 solo), four pass deflections, and two interceptions in 16 games and zero starts.

==== 1986 season ====
Throughout training camp, Robinson competed against Paul Moyer for the starting role at free safety after it was left vacant following the departure of John Harris. Head coach Chuck Knox named Robinson the starting free safety to begin the regular season, pairing him with Kenny Easley. On September 7, 1986, Robinson earned his first career start in the Seattle Seahawks' home-opener against the Pittsburgh Steelers and recorded four combined tackles (three solo) during a 0—30 shutout victory. On September 14, 1986, Robinson made five combined tackles (three solo), a pass deflection, and helped secure a 17—23 win against the Kansas City Chiefs by intercepting a pass by Todd Blackledge late in the fourth quarter. He started in all 16 games for the first time in his career and finished the season with 99 combined tackles (81 solo), ten pass deflections, three interceptions, and three forced fumbles.

==== 1987 season ====
He returned as the starting free safety alongside strong safety Kenny Easley. He was inactive for four games (Weeks 3—6) due to an ankle injury. In Week 8, he set a season-high with 11 combined tackles (seven solo) and had one pass deflection during a 28—17 win against the Minnesota Vikings. On November 15, 1987, Robinson recorded four combined tackles (three solo), made one pass deflection, and led the Seahawks from a 13—7 deficit after recovering a blocked punt by Don Bracken and returning it for an 15—yard touchdown during a 13—24 victory against the Green Bay Packers. In Week 15, Robinson recorded ten combined tackles (six solo), made two pass deflections, and set a career-high with two interceptions on passes by Mike Tomczak during a 34—21 victory at the Chicago Bears. He finished the season with 69 combined tackles (50 solo), three pass deflections, three interceptions, a fumble recovery, and scored one touchdown in 12 games and 12 starts.

The Seattle Seahawks finished the 1987 NFL season second in the AFC West with a 9—6 record to earn a Wild-Card position. On January 3, 1988, Robinson started in his first career playoff game and recorded 12 combined tackles (eight solo) as the Seahawks lost the AFC Wild-Card Game in overtime 23—20 at the Houston Oilers.

==== 1988 season ====
Head coach Chuck Knox retained Robinson as the starting free safety and paired him with strong safety Paul Moyer following the trade and sudden retirement of Kenny Easley. In Week 2, he made four solo tackles, one pass break-up, and had his lone interception of the season on a pass attempt by Steve DeBerg as the Seahawks routed the Kansas City Chiefs 10—31. On September 18, 1988, Robinson made four combined tackles (three solo), one pass deflection, and had the first sack of his career on Babe Laufenberg for a 13—yard loss during a 6—17 loss at the San Diego Chargers. In Week 4, he set a season-high with 11 combined tackles (four solo) and had one pass break-up as the Seahawks were routed by the San Francisco 49ers 7—38. He started in all 16 games throughout the 1988 NFL season and set a career-high with 115 combined tackles (86 solo) while also making five pass deflections, one fumble recovery, one sack, and an interception.

==== 1989 season ====
On July 21, 1989, the Seattle Seahawks re-signed Robinson to a three—year, $724,500 contract. Head coach Chuck Knox traded for Los Angeles Rams' safety Johnnie Johnson in order for him to compete against Robinson for the starting role at free safety. Head coach Chuck Knox named Robinson a backup free safety and primarily used him on special teams to begin the season. In his place, Knox named Johnnie Johnson and Paul Moyer as the starting safeties with Nesby Glasgow as the primary backup.

On October 1, 1989, Robinson made five combined tackles (three solo), two pass deflections, and secured the Seahawks' 14—7 victory at the Los Angeles Raiders by intercepting Jay Schroeder's pass to wide receiver Mervyn Fernandez with 30 seconds left in the game. In Week 7, he recorded six combined tackles (three solo) and set a season-high with three pass deflections during a 21—24 loss to the Denver Broncos. On December 23, 1989, Robinson set a season-high with 12 combined tackles (eight solo), made two pass deflections, and intercepted Mark Rypien's pass attempt to wide receiver Art Monk as the Seahawks were shutout 29—0 by the Washington Redskins. He finished the 1989 NFL season with 102 combined tackles (76 solo), five pass deflections, two forced fumbles, and made five interceptions in 16 games and 14 starts. For the second consecutive season, Robinson led the team in tackles with 102 combined tackles.

==== 1990 season ====
He entered training camp slated as the de facto starting free safety. Head coach Chuck Knox named Robinson and rookie second round pick (34th overall) Robert Blackmon as the starting safeties to begin the regular season. Following the first three games, defensive coordinator Tom Catlin elected to promote Nesby Glasgow to starting strong safety alongside Robinson for the rest of the season. In Week 5, he made three solo tackles, one pass deflection, a fumble recovery, and intercepted a pass attempt by Marc Wilson to wide receiver Cedric Jones during a 33—20 win at the New England Patriots. In Week 9, he set a season-high with ten combined tackles (five solo) during a 14—31 loss to the San Diego Chargers. On November 25, 1990, Robinson made six combined tackles (four solo), a pass deflection, and made a crucial interception on Billy Joe Tolliver during the fourth quarter that immediately led to the game-tying touchdown in the Seahawks' 13—10 overtime victory at the San Diego Chargers. On December 30, 1990, Robinson recorded four combined tackles (three solo), made one pass deflection, and scored a touchdown after returning a fumble recovery for 16—yards after Vann McElroy had a strip/sack on Rodney Peete as the Seahawks defeated the Detroit Lions 10—30. He started in all 16 games throughout the 1990 NFL season and finished with 82 combined tackles (63 solo), five pass deflections, four fumble recoveries, three interceptions, a forced fumble, and scored one touchdown.

==== 1991 season ====
Head coach Chuck Knox named Robinson and Robert Blackmon the starting safeties to begin the regular season after Nesby Glasgow satout the majority of training camp as a contract holdout. On October 20, 1991, Robinson made four combined tackles (three solo), one pass deflection, and intercepted a pass by Neil O'Donnell during a 27—7 win at the Pittsburgh Steelers. This marked his fourth consecutive game with an interception. In Week 9, he set a season-high with nine combined tackles (four solo) and had one pass deflection during a 20—9 victory against the San Diego Chargers. He started in all 16 games for the second consecutive season and made 93 combined tackles (69 solo), seven pass deflections, five interceptions, one sack, one forced fumble, and a fumble recovery. On December 28, 1991, the Seattle Seahawks' head coach Chuck Knox officially resigned after they finished the 1991 NFL season with a 9—7 record.

==== 1992 season ====
On January 7, 1992, the Seattle Seahawks announced that team president and general manager Tom Flores would be their new head coach.

On November 30, 1992, Robinson recorded four combined tackles (three solo), one pass deflection, and help secure a 13—16 win against the Denver Broncos by intercepting a pass attempt by Tommy Maddox late in the fourth quarter. On December 6, 1992, Robinson recorded five combined tackles (four solo), set a season-high with three pass deflections, and set a career-high with three interceptions after picking off Neil O'Donnell twice and followed it by intercepting backup Bubby Brister during a 14—20 loss at the Pittsburgh Steelers. He started in all 16 games for the third consecutive season and finished with 94 combined tackles (64 solo), 12 pass deflections, seven interceptions, two forced fumbles, one fumble recovery, and was credited with 1.5 sacks. His performance earned him a selection to the 1993 Pro Bowl, marking the first Pro Bowl selection of his career.

==== 1993 season ====
Head coach Tom Flores retained Robinson as the starting free safety and paired him with Robert Blackmon. Teammates voted Robinson to be the defensive captain for the team. In Week 8, Robinson set a season-high with 12 combined tackles (eight solo) and had two pass break-ups during a 10—9 victory against the New England Patriots. On November 14, 1993, Robinson made 11 combined tackles (eight solo), two pass deflections, two forced fumbles, a fumble recovery, and set a season-high with two interceptions on pass attempts by Todd Philcox as the Seahawks routed the Cleveland Browns 5—22. His performance in Week 11 against the Browns earned him AFC Defensive Player of the Week honors.

On December 24, 1993, the Seattle Seahawks signed Robinson to a two—year, $2.40 million contract extension before the new salary cap deadline that would come into effect at the beginning of 1994. On December 26, 1993, Robinson made five combined tackles (four solo), one pass deflection, a sack, a fumble recovery, and secured a 6—16 victory against the Pittsburgh Steelers after intercepting Neil O'Donnell's pass attempt with 5:30 left in the fourth quarter. He started in all 16 games for the fourth consecutive season and finished with 111 combined tackles (84 solo), 15 pass deflections, nine interceptions, three forced fumbles, two fumble recoveries, and two sacks. He was selected to the 1994 Pro Bowl, marking his second consecutive Pro Bowl selection. He was named first-team All-NFL by the Pro Football Writers of America, USA Today, Pro Football Weekly, and NFL Films. He was named second-team All-Pro by the Associated Press and earned the Marcus Nalley Award after teammates named him their Most Valuable Player. His nine interceptions set a new career-high in single season interceptions and also tied Buffalo Bills cornerback Nate Odomes for the league lead.

==== 1994 season ====
In Week 4, he set a season-high with eight combined tackles (seven solo), made one pass deflection, and picked off a pass attempt by Neil O'Donnell as the Seahawks routed the Pittsburgh Steelers 13—30. On December 4, 1994, Robinson recorded five combined tackles (four solo), set a season-high with two pass deflections, recovered a fumble, and intercepted a pass Don Majkowski to wide receiver Sean Dawkins during a 31—19 loss to the Indianapolis Colts.

On December 11, 1994, Robinson recorded five combined tackles (four solo) and had one pass break-up before exiting in the third quarter as the Seahawks won 16—14 at the Houston Oilers after injuring his leg. The following day, the Seahawks officially placed Robinson on injured reserve for the last two games of the season after it was discovered he had torn his Achilles tendon and required surgery. On December 29, 1994, the Seattle Seahawks fired head coach/general manager Tom Flores after they finished the 1994 NFL season fifth in the AFC West with a 6—10 record. He finished the season with 80 combined tackles (65 solo), eight pass deflections, three interceptions, one fumble recovery, and made one sack in 14 games and 14 starts.

==== 1995 season ====
On January 13, 1995, the Seattle Seahawks announced the hiring of Miami head coach Dennis Erickson. Robinson made a remarkable return and recovered in time to participate in training camp. Defensive coordinator Greg McMackin named Robinson and Robert Blackmon the starting safeties to begin the regular season. In Week 6, Robinson recorded 11 solo tackles and set a season-high with three pass deflections during a 14—34 loss at the Oakland Raiders. On December 10, 1995, Robinson set a season-high with 14 combined tackles (12 solo), made two pass deflections, and intercepted a pass John Elway attempted to throw to wide receiver Mike Pritchard during a 31—27 win at the Denver Broncos. He started in all 16 games throughout the 1995 NFL season and set a career-high with 111 combined tackles (85 solo) and also made seven pass deflections, a fumble recovery, and an interception.

=== Green Bay Packers ===
==== 1996 season ====
On June 27, 1996, the Seattle Seahawks traded Robinson to the Green Bay Packers in exchange for defensive end Matt LaBounty. Plans for the Seahawks trading Robinson had been rumored for some time after he allegedly refused to agree to take a 75% pay cut for the upcoming season, from $1.2 million to $300,000. He became expendable after the Seahawks signed free agent Darryl Williams. On July 17, 1996, the Packers subsequently traded former starting safety George Teague to the Atlanta Falcons. Head coach Mike Holmgren named Robinson the starting free safety to begin the season and paired him with strong safety LeRoy Butler.

On September 22,1996, Robinson recorded six combined tackles (four solo), set a season-high with two pass deflections, and had his first interception as a member of the Packers, picking off a pass attempt by Warren Moon during a 21—30 loss at the Minnesota Vikings. In Week 7, he set a season-high with eight combined tackles (three solo), made one pass deflection, and intercepted a pass Elvis Grbac attempted to throw to J. J. Stokes as the Packers defeated the San Francisco 49ers 20—23. In Week 14, Robinson set a season-high with seven solo tackles, made a pass deflection, and intercepted a pass attempt by Dave Krieg during a 17—28 victory against the Chicago Bears. He started in all 16 games and recorded 81 combined tackles (55 solo), 12 pass deflections, and six interceptions. Under defensive coordinator Fritz Shurmur, the addition of Robinson immensely improved the Packers' pass defense. As a former cornerback and intelligent veteran, Robinson was able to excel in pass coverage, allowing strong safety LeRoy Butler to line up in the box and along the line of scrimmage, which aided the defensive line that included Reggie White. His experience and pass coverage ability aided a young core of cornerbacks that included Doug Evans, Craig Newsome, and Tyrone Williams.

The Green Bay Packers finished the 1996 NFL season first in the NFC Central with an 13—3 record, clinching a playoff berth and earning a first round bye. On January 4, 1997, Robinson started in the NFC Wild-Card Game and recorded one solo tackle, made two pass deflections, and led the game with two interceptions on pass attempts by Steve Young as the Packers defeated the San Francisco 49ers 14—35. The following week, the Packers defeated the Carolina Panthers 30—13 to win the NFC Championship Game and advance to the Super Bowl. On January 26, 1997, Robinson started in Super Bowl XXXI and recorded a team-high nine combined tackles (six solo) and made one pass break-up as the Packers defeated the New England Patriots 35–21. He earned his first career Super Bowl ring.

==== 1997 season ====
Then again, after the 1997 season, Robinson and the Packers went to Super Bowl XXXII, however they lost 31–24, to the Denver Broncos. With his team trailing 24–17 in the third quarter, Robinson intercepted a pass from Broncos quarterback John Elway in the end zone, preventing Denver from building a bigger lead and setting up a touchdown on Green Bay's ensuing drive to tie the game. He also recorded an interception of Steve Young that set up a touchdown in the Packers 23–10 win over the San Francisco 49ers in the NFC title game two weeks prior.

=== Atlanta Falcons ===
On March 6, 1998, the Atlanta Falcons signed Robinson to a two—year, $3.55 million contract as an unrestricted free agent.

After the 1997 season, Robinson joined the Atlanta Falcons in 1998. During the season, Robinson recorded 46 tackles, two fumble recoveries, four interceptions, and one touchdown return, earning his third career Pro Bowl selection. After making a game-saving play in the NFC Championship game (breaking up an otherwise certain winning touchdown to Minnesota Vikings wide receiver Randy Moss), Robinson made it to his third consecutive Super Bowl, facing the Broncos for the second straight season.

The night prior to Super Bowl XXXIII, Robinson was arrested by an undercover police officer for soliciting a prostitute. Earlier that day, Robinson received the Athletes in Action/Bart Starr Award, given annually to a player who best exemplifies outstanding character and leadership in the home, on the field and in the community. After the arrest, Robinson agreed to return the award.

The next day, without much sleep the night before due to the prostitution incident, Robinson gave up an 80-yard touchdown reception to Broncos receiver Rod Smith, giving the Broncos a 17–3 lead over the Falcons. Later, in the fourth quarter, he missed a tackle on Denver running back Terrell Davis that enabled Davis to break a long run to the Atlanta 10-yard line. The Atlanta Falcons ended up losing the game, 34–19, and Robinson was widely denounced by the press and fans for the previous night's incident. The next season was Robinson's last with the Falcons.

=== Carolina Panthers ===
On August 12, 2000, the Carolina Panthers signed Robinson to a one—year, $440,000 contract at the league minimum for a veteran.

After leaving the Falcons, Robinson joined the Carolina Panthers, and retired following the 2000 season.

=== Career summary ===
In his 16 seasons, Robinson recorded 1,415 tackles, 57 interceptions, 762 return yards, 22 fumble recoveries, 71 return yards, and two touchdowns (one fumble return, one interception return), and 7.5 sacks. His 57 interceptions have been exceeded by just 11 players, four of whom are in the Pro Football Hall of Fame.

== NFL career statistics ==
Legend
	Won the Super Bowl
	Led the league
**Bold**	Career high

=== Regular season ===
Year	Team	Games		Tackles					Interceptions				Fumbles	
Year	Team	GP	GS	Cmb	Solo	Ast	TFL	Sck	Int	Yds	TD	PD	FF	FR
1985	SEA	**16**	0	28	–	–	–	0.0	2	47	0	–	0	0
1986	SEA	**16**	**16**	99	–	–	–	0.0	3	39	0	–	0	3
1987	SEA	12	12	69	–	–	–	0.0	3	75	0	–	0	1
1988	SEA	**16**	**16**	**115**	–	–	–	1.0	1	0	0	–	1	0
1989	SEA	**16**	14	107	–	–	–	0.0	5	24	0	–	2	1
1990	SEA	**16**	**16**	82	–	–	–	0.0	3	89	0	–	1	**4**
1991	SEA	**16**	**16**	93	–	–	–	1.0	5	56	0	–	1	1
1992	SEA	**16**	**16**	94	–	–	–	0.0	7	**126**	0	–	2	1
1993	SEA	**16**	**16**	111	–	–	–	2.0	**9**	80	0	–	**3**	2
1994	SEA	14	14	80	65	15	–	1.0	3	18	0	–	0	1
1995	SEA	**16**	**16**	105	**79**	26	–	0.0	1	32	0	–	0	1
1996	GB	**16**	**16**	81	55	26	–	0.0	6	107	0	–	0	0
1997	GB	**16**	**16**	112	75	**37**	–	**2.5**	1	26	0	–	1	2
1998	ATL	**16**	**16**	68	48	20	–	0.0	4	36	**1**	–	2	2
1999	ATL	**16**	**16**	92	63	29	**3**	0.0	3	7	0	**4**	1	0
2000	CAR	**16**	**16**	77	65	12	1	0.0	1	0	0	1	1	3
Career		250	232	1,413	450	165	4	7.5	57	762	1	5	15	22

== Coaching and broadcasting career ==
Robinson served as a color analyst for the Carolina Panthers Radio Network from 2002 to 2018. He is a varsity football and wrestling coach at Charlotte Christian School in Charlotte, North Carolina.

Beginning in January 2015, Robinson is a co-host of the morning television show Charlotte Today on WCNC-TV, Charlotte, NC.

== Personal life ==
Robinson is a Christian and spoke with the Carolina Panthers team before Super Bowl 50.
