= Kelvin Martin (American football) =

American football player and coach (born 1965)

No. 83, 84
- Positions: Wide receiver, return specialist

Personal information
- Born: May 14, 1965 (age 61); San Diego, California, U.S.
- Listed height: 5 ft 9 in (1.75 m)
- Listed weight: 163 lb (74 kg)

Career information
- High school: Jean Ribault (Jacksonville, Florida)
- College: Boston College
- NFL draft: 1987: 4th round, 95th overall pick
- Expansion draft: 1995: 29th round, 57th overall pick

Career history

Playing
- Dallas Cowboys (1987–1992); Seattle Seahawks (1993–1994); Jacksonville Jaguars (1995)*; Philadelphia Eagles (1995); Dallas Cowboys (1996)
- * Offseason or practice squad member only

Coaching
- Jacksonville (2000) Wide receivers coach & special teams coach; North Texas (2001–2002) Wide receivers coach & special teams coordinator

Awards and highlights
- Super Bowl champion (XXVII); First-team All-Pro (1992); First-team All-American (1985); 2× All-ECAC (1985, 1986)

Career NFL statistics
- Receptions: 367
- Receiving yards: 4,768
- Receiving touchdowns: 18
- Stats at Pro Football Reference

Kelvin Brian Martin (born May 14, 1965) is an American former professional football player who was a wide receiver in the National Football League (NFL). He was selected by the Dallas Cowboys in the fourth round of the 1987 NFL draft. He won Super Bowl XXVII with the Cowboys against the Buffalo Bills, giving him his only Super Bowl title. He played college football for the Boston College Eagles before playing ten seasons in the NFL from 1987 to 1996 for the Cowboys, Seattle Seahawks, and Philadelphia Eagles.

== Early life ==
At Jean Ribault High School in 1982, he made first-team All-City and All-Conference, while leading all Jacksonville wide receivers in catches (47), yards (746) and touchdowns (7).

Martin accepted a scholarship to play for Boston College, where he was a three-year starter and is recognized as one of the top wide receivers in school history.

In 1985, he was named as an All-East wide receiver, had a career-high 172 receiving yards against University of Pittsburgh, and was key contributor in Boston College’s Cotton Bowl win. He also caught the winning touchdown pass in the final seconds of Boston College 27-24 Hall of Fame Bowl victory over University of Georgia in 1986.

As a punt return specialist, he led the nation in yardage in 1985 (510). He set Boston College records for career returns (79 for 1,012 yards), single season yardage (510), single game yardage (166), and scored four touchdowns on punt runbacks.

- 1983: 6 catches for 119 yards with 1 TD
- 1984: 37 catches for 715 yards with 10 TD
- 1985: 49 catches for 958 yards with 9 TD
- 1986: 41 catches for 545 yards with 8 TD

In 2000, he was Inducted into the Boston College Varsity Club Athletic Hall of Fame. He still holds the career touchdown receptions record with 28, remains second in career yardage (2,337 yards) and fifth in receptions (133). Overall, he scored 194 career points.

== Professional career ==
=== Dallas Cowboys (first stint) ===
Martin was drafted in the fourth round of the 1987 NFL draft (95th overall) by the Dallas Cowboys, after dropping because of concerns over his size and speed.

He was used mostly as a punt and kickoff returner as a rookie after missing the first 8 games with injury. Nicknamed "K-Mart", by his second season he was named the starter wide receiver alongside Michael Irvin and finished third on the team with 49 receptions. In 1989, he led the team in receptions (46) and receiving yards (644), even though he was placed on the injured reserve list on November 21, with a left knee interior cruciate ligament injury. The next year, he repeated as the team leader in receptions (64) and receiving yards (732).

With the arrival of Alvin Harper in 1991, he was limited to a third down role and as a punt returner, where he ranked third in the NFC with an 11.6 average. Against the Philadelphia Eagles, he returned a punt 85 yards for a game-winning touchdown in a 25–13 win and also set a franchise record with 124 total punt return yards in a game.

Martin caught 32 passes for 359 yards and three touchdowns, while also finishing second in the NFL with a 12.7 punt return average during the 1992 Super Bowl championship season. His six-yard touchdown reception in the closing minutes of the NFC Championship game sealed a 30-20 Dallas victory over the favored San Francisco 49ers. He participated in Super Bowl XXVII and did not have any receptions in the game, but returned 3 punts for 35 yards and 4 kickoffs for 79 for a total of 114 yards, the same number of yards that Michael Irvin had with his 6 receptions in the game.

After the season, the Cowboys couldn't resign him because of salary cap considerations, so he declared for free agency, leaving as the franchise all-time leader in punt-return yardage with 1,803 yards and the tenth leading receiver (212 receptions, 2,703 yards and 8 touchdowns). He also led the team in punt returns in five different seasons, tying the record held by Bob Hayes.

=== Seattle Seahawks ===
Martin signed with the Seattle Seahawks as an unrestricted free agent in 1993 and had his best statistical season with 57 receptions for 798 yards and 5 receiving touchdowns (led the team). He was also the team punt returner and ranked 10th in the AFC with an 8.4 average.

In two years with the team, he registered 113 receptions, 1,479 yards and six touchdowns. He was left unprotected for the 1995 NFL expansion draft.

=== Jacksonville Jaguars ===
He was selected by the Jacksonville Jaguars in the 1995 NFL expansion draft, but was later released to reach the 95-man roster limit.

=== Philadelphia Eagles ===
After his release he signed as a free agent with the Philadelphia Eagles, and appeared in nine games during the 1995 season, catching 17 passes for 206 yards. He was placed on the injured reserve list on December 13, 1995.

=== Dallas Cowboys (second stint) ===
Martin re-signed with the Cowboys in 1996, catching 25 passes for 380 yards. He retired at the end of the season, finishing his career with 367 passes for 4,768 yards, 15 touchdowns, 261 punt returns for 2,567 yards and 76 kickoff returns for 1,453 yards.

== NFL career statistics ==
Legend
	Won the Super Bowl
**Bold**	Career high

=== Regular season ===
Year	Team	Games		Receiving				
Year	Team	GP	GS	Rec	Yds	Avg	Lng	TD
1987	DAL	7	0	5	103	**20.6**	33	0
1988	DAL	**16**	7	49	622	12.7	35	3
1989	DAL	11	11	46	644	14.0	46	2
1990	DAL	**16**	**16**	**64**	732	11.4	45	0
1991	DAL	**16**	0	16	243	15.2	27	0
1992	DAL	**16**	1	32	359	11.2	27	3
1993	SEA	**16**	14	57	**798**	14.0	53	**5**
1994	SEA	**16**	15	56	681	12.2	32	1
1995	PHI	9	1	17	206	12.1	22	0
1996	DAL	**16**	1	25	380	15.2	**60**	1
		139	66	367	4,768	13.0	60	15

=== Playoffs ===
Year	Team	Games		Receiving				
Year	Team	GP	GS	Rec	Yds	Avg	Lng	TD
1991	DAL	2	0	0	0	0.0	0	0
1992	DAL	**3**	0	4	33	8.3	12	**1**
1996	DAL	2	0	**5**	**61**	**12.2**	**18**	0
		7	0	9	94	10.4	18	1

== Personal life ==
He was a special teams and wide receivers assistant coach at Jacksonville University in 2000. He left to coach the wide receivers and special teams for the University of North Texas in 2001 and 2002, before resigning from the team following his arrest on drug charges.
