= Carlton Gray =

American football player (born 1971)

No. 26, 24, 23
- Position: Cornerback

Personal information
- Born: June 26, 1971 (age 55); Cincinnati, Ohio, U.S.
- Listed height: 6 ft 0 in (1.83 m)
- Listed weight: 198 lb (90 kg)

Career information
- High school: Forest Park (Cincinnati)
- College: UCLA
- NFL draft: 1993: 2nd round, 30th overall pick

Career history
- Seattle Seahawks (1993–1996); Indianapolis Colts (1997); New York Giants (1998); Kansas City Chiefs (1999–2000); Cincinnati Bengals (2001)*
- * Offseason or practice squad member only

Awards and highlights
- Consensus All-American (1992); Third-team All-American (1991); First-team All-Pac-10 (1992); Second-team All-Pac-10 (1991)

Career NFL statistics
- Games played: 102
- Games started: 62
- Tackles: 259
- Sacks: 2
- Interceptions: 12
- Stats at Pro Football Reference

Carlton Patrick Gray (born June 26, 1971) is an American former professional football player who was a cornerback for eight seasons in the National Football League (NFL). He played college football for the UCLA Bruins, and was recognized as an All-American. He was selected in the second round of the 1993 NFL draft by the Seattle Seahawks, and also played in the NFL for the Indianapolis Colts, New York Giants and Kansas City Chiefs.

== Early life ==
Gray was born in Cincinnati, Ohio. He went to Forest Park High School in Cincinnati, and was a prep standout in football, basketball, and track, running for Forest Park under coaches Lou Cynkar (High School) and James Michael Lafferty (junior high). He was awarded the Dial Award for the national high school scholar-athlete of the year in 1988. His grandfather, Benjamin Hooks, retired as the executive director of the NAACP.

== College career ==
Gray attended the University of California, Los Angeles, where he was a four-year starter for the Bruins teams from 1989 to 1992. He earned consensus first-team All-American honors as a senior, as well as first-team All-Pac-10 accolades. He finished second all-time in UCLA history with 16 interceptions. In 1989, he became the first freshman in a decade to start at least eight games for UCLA. In 1991, Gray finished second in the nation with 10 interceptions. After his senior season in 1992, Gray was selected to play in the Hula Bowl and East-West Shrine Game.

== Professional career ==
=== Seattle Seahawks ===
In the 1993 NFL Draft, Gray was selected by the Seattle Seahawks in the second round with the 30th pick overall pick. He played for the Seahawks from 1993 to 1996. On July 22, 1993, he officially signed with the Seahawks. His rookie year he played in ten games, starting two of them. He missed the final six games of the regular season due to an ankle injury. He also recorded a sack in 1993. In 1994, he played in 11 games before breaking his arm against the Tampa Bay Buccaneers in week 11 and missed the rest of the season. Both 1995 and 1996, Carlton played in all 16 games. In 1995, Gray had his most productive season as a pro, being second on the Seahawks with four interceptions. He also had a career-high 68 solo tackles and 5 assisted tackles. On February 16, 1996, he re-signed with the Seahawks. During his four seasons with the Seahawks, he had a total of nine interceptions, and one sack.

=== Indianapolis Colts ===
On March 3, 1997, Gray signed a 4-year, $9.7 million deal with the Colts as a free agent. During his one season with the Colts, he had 24 tackles and two interceptions. On September 3, 1998, the Colts released Gray because cornerback Tyrone Poole returned from an injury.

=== New York Giants ===
In his one season with the Giants, Gray played in 14 games and recorded 27 tackles, his second career sack, and one interception.

=== Kansas City Chiefs ===
Gray signed with the Chiefs after the departures of Dale Carter and Mark McMillian. The 1999 season, he played in all 16 games, and recorded seven tackles. During a scrimmage at River Falls in 2000, the Chiefs were scrimmaging the New Orleans Saints, and while a Saints player was at the bottom of the pile, Gray sucker punched him. After that, he rarely played, appearing in only four games.

=== Cincinnati Bengals ===
On June 6, 2001, the Bengals signed Carlton Gray to a two-year contract. However he was cut in training camp and never played a game with his hometown club.

=== NFL statistics ===
Year	Team	Games	Combined tackles	Tackles	Assisted tackles	Sacks	Forced fumbles	Fumble recoveries	Fumble return yards	Interceptions	Interception return yards	Yards per interception return	Longest Interception REturn	Interceptions returned for touchdown	Passes defended
1993	SEA	10	23	21	2	1.0	0	0	0	3	33	11	16	0	8
1994	SEA	11	51	45	6	0.0	0	0	0	2	0	0	0	0	11
1995	SEA	16	73	68	5	0.0	0	0	0	4	45	11	26	0	20
1996	SEA	16	53	45	8	0.0	1	1	0	0	3	0	3	0	7
1997	IND	15	24	20	4	0.0	0	0	0	2	0	0	0	0	8
1998	NYG	14	29	26	3	1.0	2	0	0	1	36	36	36	0	8
1999	KC	16	7	7	0	0.0	0	0	0	0	0	0	0	0	1
Career		98	260	232	28	2.0	3	1	0	12	117	10	36	0	63

== Personal life ==
Gray's daughters Amber and Chance were named McDonald's All-Americans playing basketball in high school.
