= Orlando Watters =

American football player (1971–2026)

Profile
- Position: Cornerback

Personal information
- Born: October 26, 1971; Anniston, Alabama, U.S.
- Died: June 8, 2026 (aged 54)
- Listed height: 5 ft 11 in (1.80 m)
- Listed weight: 177 lb (80 kg)

Career information
- College: Arkansas
- NFL draft: 1994: undrafted

Career history
- Seattle Seahawks (1994)

Awards and highlights
- First-team All-SEC (1993)
- Stats at Pro Football Reference

Orlando L. Watters (October 26, 1971 – June 8, 2026) was an American professional football player who was a cornerback for the Seattle Seahawks of the National Football League (NFL) in 1994. (Note: "Orlando Watters". National Football League.) He played college football for the Arkansas Razorbacks. (Note: Boling, Dave (1994-09-26). "Orlando's magic results in TD for rookie Watters". Kitsap Sun.)

Watters died on June 8, 2026, at the age of 54.
