= Rick Tuten =

American football player (1965–2017)

No. 14, 10, 11
- Position: Punter

Personal information
- Born: January 5, 1965; Perry, Florida, U.S.
- Died: June 13, 2017 (aged 52); Costa Rica
- Listed height: 6 ft 2 in (1.88 m)
- Listed weight: 221 lb (100 kg)

Career information
- High school: Forest (Ocala, Florida)
- College: Florida State
- NFL draft: 1988: undrafted

Career history
- San Diego Chargers (1988)*; Washington Redskins (1989)*; Philadelphia Eagles (1989); Buffalo Bills (1990); Green Bay Packers (1991)*; Seattle Seahawks (1991–1997); St. Louis Rams (1998–1999)
- * Offseason or practice squad member only

Awards and highlights
- Super Bowl champion (XXXIV); Second-team All-Pro (1994); Pro Bowl (1994); 2× NFL punting yards leader (1992, 1993); Seattle Seahawks 35th Anniversary team; National champion (1983)

Career NFL statistics
- Punts: 741
- Punting yards: 32,190
- Longest punt: 73
- Stats at Pro Football Reference

Richard Lamar Tuten (January 5, 1965 – June 13, 2017) was an American professional football player who was a punter in the National Football League (NFL), primarily with the Seattle Seahawks. He punted the ball 108 times in 1992, tied for fourth-most in a season in NFL history. In 1992, he punted for 4,760 yards with an average of 44.1 yards per punt. In 1994, the year he went to his only Pro Bowl, he punted the ball 91 times for 3,905 yards, an average of 42.9 yards per punt, and also scored a two-point conversion, the only scored points of his career. Tuten also received a ring as a member of the St. Louis Rams' Super Bowl championship team. However, he did not play in the game itself due to injury.

While with the Seattle Seahawks in 1998, he won the designation as the league's strongest man pound-for-pound in Flex magazine.

He has a daughter named Ryan, who married Buffalo Bills Kicker Tyler Bass on March 15, 2024, in Ocala, FL. He also has a son named Chase.

While on vacation with his wife in Costa Rica in 2017, Tuten unexpectedly died at age 52.

== Career statistics ==
Regular season

†	Denotes Super Bowl–winning season
	Led the league

Season	Team	GP	Punting					
Season	Team	GP	Punts	Yards	Y/P	Net	In20	TB
1989	Philadelphia	2	7	256	36.6	33.6	1	1
1990	Buffalo	14	53	2,107	39.8	34.2	12	4
1991	Seattle	10	49	2,106	43.0	36.9	8	3
1992	Seattle	16	108	4,760	44.1	38.7	29	8
1993	Seattle	16	90	4,007	44.5	37.3	21	7
1994	Seattle	16	91	3,905	42.9	36.7	33	7
1995	Seattle	16	83	3,735	45.0	36.5	21	8
1996	Seattle	16	85	3,746	44.1	34.5	20	7
1997	Seattle	11	48	2,007	41.8	36.4	15	5
1998	St. Louis	16	95	4,202	44.2	35.3	16	10
1999†	St. Louis	8	32	1,359	42.5	34.9	9	7
Career		141	741	32,190	43.4	36.3	185	67
