= Russ Purnell =

American football coach (born 1948)

Personal information
- Born: June 12, 1948 (age 78); Chicago, Illinois, U.S.

Career information
- College: Whittier

Career history
- Whittier (1970–1971) Graduate Assistant; Corona del Mar High School (1972) Offensive assistant & special teams coach; Edison High School (1973-1981) Offensive assistant & special teams coach; USC (1982–1985) Special teams coach & tight ends coach; Seattle Seahawks (1986) Offensive assistant; Seattle Seahawks (1987–1991) Tight ends coach & assistant special teams coach; Seattle Seahawks (1992–1994) Tight ends coach & special teams coach; Houston/Tennessee Oilers (1995–1998) Special teams coach; Baltimore Ravens (1999–2001) Special teams coach; Indianapolis Colts (2002–2008) Special teams coach; Jacksonville Jaguars (2009–2011) Special teams coordinator; Omaha Nighthawks (2012) Special teams coordinator; Carolina Panthers (2015–2016) Assistant special teams coordinator

Awards and highlights
- 2× Super Bowl champion (XXXV, XLI))

Russ Purnell (born June 12, 1948) is an American football coach. He has served for 26 seasons as an assistant coach in the NFL, mainly coordinating the special teams units. He is one of only 21 NFL assistant coaches who have won at least one Super Bowl championship with two different teams (Baltimore and Indianapolis). He was also the special teams coordinator for the Omaha Nighthawks of the United Football League (UFL).

== Playing career ==
Purnell played center at Orange Coast College and transferred to Whittier College, where he graduated with a business degree and served as a graduate assistant from 1970–71.

== Coaching career ==
Purnell began his coaching career at Corona del Mar High School in 1972 and coached at Edison High School (Huntington Beach, California) from 1973–81. He joined the University of Southern California staff as special teams and tight ends coach from 1982–85.

Purnell spent four seasons (1995–98) with the Houston/Tennessee Oilers after serving nine seasons (1986–94) with the Seattle Seahawks. With Seattle, he was tight ends/assistant special teams coach in 1987 before taking over the special teams and tight ends in 1992.

Purnell spent three seasons with the Baltimore Ravens as special teams coordinator from 1999–2001. Under Purnell’s leadership, kicker Matt Stover made the Pro Bowl in 2000, while kick returner Jermaine Lewis was tabbed for the honor in 2001. Stover connected on 93 of 107 field goals from 1999–2001, an 86.9% conversation rate. Lewis had an 84-yard kickoff return for a touchdown in the Super Bowl XXXV win against the New York Giants. Punter Kyle Richardson led the NFL in punts inside the 20 in 1999 and 2000. Baltimore led the NFL with a 14.8-yard punt return average in 2000, while Lewis (36-16.1 avg.) had the highest seasonal average for any player with 30-plus returns in NFL history and had two returns for touchdowns against the New York Jets.

Purnell served as special teams coach for the Indianapolis Colts under Tony Dungy from 2002–08. Under Purnell’s guidance, kicker Mike Vanderjagt (217/248, 87.5 pct.) became the most accurate field goal kicker in NFL history, and he set the NFL record with 42 consecutive field goals from 2002–04. In hitting all 37 field goal attempts in 2003, Vanderjagt posted only the fourth perfect season in NFL history, while earning his first Pro Bowl bid. Vanderjagt earned the Pro Football Weekly Golden Toe Award, the third time in Purnell’s career he tutored the award’s winner (Rick Tuten, Seattle, 1994; Stover, Baltimore, 2000). The Colts kickoff return unit ranked 8th in the NFL in 2004 and in 2005 the team’s coverage units ranked 5th in kickoff return average and seventh in punt return average. In 2006, Colts kicker Adam Vinatieri hit 25 of 28 field goals and all 38 PATs for 113 points as the team's field goal percentage ranked in the top five in the NFL. Terrence Wilkins served as the punt and kick returner for the Colts in 2006 and turned in an 82-yard punt return. In 2007, T. J. Rushing tied the franchise record with a 90-yard punt return touchdown. In 2008, Vinatieri connected on 20 of 25 field goals and produced a 13th consecutive 100-plus point season. Punter Hunter Smith recorded 23 punts inside the 20 out of his 53 punts.

Purnell joined the Carolina Panthers on May 5, 2015, as assistant special teams coordinator when special teams coordinator Bruce DeHaven took a leave of absence.

In the 2015 season, Purnell and the Panthers reached Super Bowl 50 on February 7, 2016. The Panthers fell to the Denver Broncos by a score of 24–10.

After the 2016 season, Purnell announced his retirement from coaching.

== Special teams Pro Bowlers coached ==
- Rick Tuten—1994
- John Henry Mills—1996
- Craig Hentrich—1998
- Matt Stover—2000
- Jermaine Lewis—2001
- Mike Vanderjagt—2003
- Montell Owens—2010
