= Leonard Russell (American football) =

American football player (born 1969)

No. 32, 42
- Position: Running back

Personal information
- Born: November 17, 1969 (age 56); Long Beach, California, U.S.
- Listed height: 6 ft 2 in (1.88 m)
- Listed weight: 240 lb (109 kg)

Career information
- High school: Long Beach Polytechnic
- College: Arizona State
- NFL draft: 1991: 1st round, 14th overall pick

Career history
- New England Patriots (1991–1993); Denver Broncos (1994); St. Louis Rams (1995); San Diego Chargers (1996)

Awards and highlights
- NFL Offensive Rookie of the Year (1991); PFWA All-Rookie Team (1991); New England Patriots All-1990s Team; Second-team All-Pac-10 (1990)

Career NFL statistics
- Rushing yards: 3,973
- Rushing average: 3.4
- Rushing touchdowns: 29
- Stats at Pro Football Reference

Leonard James Russell (born November 17, 1969) is an American former professional football player who was a running back for six seasons in the National Football League (NFL). He played college football for the Arizona State Sun Devils. Russell was selected by the New England Patriots in the first round of the 1991 NFL draft with the 14th overall pick. He played from 1991 to 1996 for the Patriots, Denver Broncos, St. Louis Rams, and San Diego Chargers.

== Professional career ==
In 1991, Russell was selected as the AP Offensive Rookie of the Year after rushing for 959 yards and 4 touchdowns for the Patriots.

In 1993, Bill Parcells took over as head coach, bringing a strong focus on running the football. Russell rushed for 1,088 yards and 7 TDs.

Before the start of the 1994 season, following his best year with New England, he was released after the Patriots traded for Marion Butts, the leading rusher from the Chargers.

Though not always utilized heavily in the passing game, Russell was an effective receiver for a power running back, catching 71.2% of targets during his career.

== NFL career statistics ==
Year	Team	GP	Att	Yds	Avg	Lng	TD	Rec	Yds	Avg	Lng	TD
1991	NE	16	266	959	3.6	24	4	18	81	4.5	18	0
1992	NE	11	123	390	3.2	23	2	11	24	2.2	12	0
1993	NE	16	300	1,088	3.6	21	7	26	245	9.4	69	0
1994	DEN	14	190	620	3.3	22	9	38	227	6.0	19	0
1995	STL	13	66	203	3.1	18	0	16	89	5.6	17	0
1996	SD	15	219	713	3.3	21	7	13	180	13.8	35	1
Career		85	1,164	3,973	3.4	24	29	122	846	6.9	69	1

== Personal life ==
Former Indianapolis Colts cornerback Chuckie Miller is his cousin.
