= Dean Wells (American football) =

American football player (1970–2025)

No. 95
- Position: Linebacker

Personal information
- Born: July 20, 1970; Louisville, Kentucky, U.S.
- Died: April 3, 2025 (aged 54)
- Listed height: 6 ft 3 in (1.91 m)
- Listed weight: 248 lb (112 kg)

Career information
- High school: Holy Cross (Louisville, Kentucky)
- College: Kentucky
- NFL draft: 1993: 4th round, 85th overall pick

Career history
- Seattle Seahawks (1993–1998); Carolina Panthers (1999–2001)

Career NFL statistics
- Tackles: 529
- Sacks: 2.5
- Interceptions: 3
- Forced fumbles: 6
- Fumble recoveries: 4
- Stats at Pro Football Reference

Dean Wells (July 20, 1970 – April 3, 2025) was an American professional football player who was a linebacker in the National Football League (NFL) from 1993 to 2001.

Wells played college football for the Kentucky Wildcats. He holds the school record for most sacks in a single game, recording five against Indiana in 1992, as well as single-season sack record with 10. Wells was selected in the fourth round of the 1993 NFL draft by the Seattle Seahawks and played five seasons for the team, leading the defense in tackles in 1996. He signed as a free agent with the Carolina Panthers in 1999 and spent three seasons with the team.

Wells ended his career with 529 tackles, 2.5 sacks, six forced fumbles, four fumble recoveries, and three interceptions. He died from acute lymphoblastic leukemia on April 3, 2025, at the age of 54.
