= Jeff Blackshear =

American football player (1969–2019)

No. 60, 69
- Position: Guard

Personal information
- Born: March 29, 1969; Fort Pierce, Florida, U.S.
- Died: August 31, 2019 (aged 50)
- Listed height: 6 ft 6 in (1.98 m)
- Listed weight: 316 lb (143 kg)

Career information
- High school: Fort Pierce Westwood (Fort Pierce, Florida)
- College: Northeast Louisiana
- NFL draft: 1993: 8th round, 197th overall pick

Career history
- Seattle Seahawks (1993–1995); Baltimore Ravens (1996–1999); Kansas City Chiefs (2000); Green Bay Packers (2002)

Career NFL statistics
- Games played: 128
- Games started: 96
- Stats at Pro Football Reference

Jeffrey Leon Blackshear (March 29, 1969 – August 31, 2019) was an American professional football guard who played nine seasons in the National Football League (NFL). He played for the Seattle Seahawks, Baltimore Ravens, Kansas City Chiefs and Green Bay Packers. He was drafted by the Seahawks in the eighth round of the 1993 NFL Draft with the 197th overall pick. Blackshear attended Northeast Louisiana University.
