= Mitch Frerotte =

American football player (1965–2008)

No. 59
- Position: Guard

Personal information
- Born: March 30, 1965; Kittanning, Pennsylvania, U.S.
- Died: June 11, 2008 (aged 43); Kittanning, Pennsylvania, U.S.
- Listed height: 6 ft 3 in (1.91 m)
- Listed weight: 281 lb (127 kg)

Career information
- College: Penn State
- NFL draft: 1987: undrafted

Career history
- Buffalo Bills (1987–1992); Seattle Seahawks (1993–1994)

Awards and highlights
- National champion (1986)

Career NFL statistics
- Games played: 58
- Games started: 3
- Touchdowns: 2
- Stats at Pro Football Reference

Paul Mitchael Frerotte (March 30, 1965 – June 11, 2008) was an American professional football player who played as a guard for four seasons in the National Football League (NFL), all with the Buffalo Bills.

== Biography ==
Frerotte is perhaps best known for scoring three touchdowns during the 1992 NFL season, a record for an offensive lineman.

Frerotte played in three Super Bowls: XXV, XXVI, and XXVII. He attended Kittanning High School and Penn State University.

== Personal life ==
Known as "Pit Bull" by his Bills teammates, Frerotte often wore an elaborate mask of eye black during games. He was a well-known Harley-Davidson enthusiast, who once threatened ESPN's Joe Theismann with bodily harm after he mounted Frerotte's motorcycle without permission.

Frerotte is the cousin of NFL quarterback Gus Frerotte. Mitch died from a massive heart attack at his mother's home on June 11, 2008. The coroner's report attributed his death to hypertrophic cardiomyopathy, a genetic heart condition which the American Heart Association calls the most common cause of sudden death in young athletes.
