= Todd Philcox =

American football player (born 1966)

No. 17, 15, 5, 10
- Position: Quarterback

Personal information
- Born: September 25, 1966 (age 60); Norwalk, Connecticut, U.S.
- Listed height: 6 ft 4 in (1.93 m)
- Listed weight: 218 lb (99 kg)

Career information
- High school: Norwalk (CT)
- College: Syracuse
- NFL draft: 1989: undrafted

Career history
- Cincinnati Bengals (1989–1990); Cleveland Browns (1991–1993); Cincinnati Bengals (1994); Miami Dolphins (1995)*; Tampa Bay Buccaneers (1995); Jacksonville Jaguars (1996); San Diego Chargers (1997); New England Patriots (1998)
- * Offseason or practice squad member only

Career NFL statistics
- Passing attempts: 173
- Passing completions: 85
- Completion percentage: 49.1%
- TD–INT: 7–11
- Passing yards: 1,138
- Passer rating: 57.4
- Stats at Pro Football Reference

Todd Philcox (born September 25, 1966, in Norwalk, Connecticut) is a former NFL quarterback.

== Career ==
Pre-draft measurables
Height	Weight	40-yard dash	10-yard split	20-yard split	20-yard shuttle	Vertical jump
6 ft 4 in (1.93 m)	213 lb (97 kg)	5.12 s	1.73 s	2.96 s	4.43 s	27.5 in (0.70 m)
All values from NFL Combine

Philcox came out of Syracuse University and then played nine years in the NFL for the Cincinnati Bengals, Cleveland Browns, Tampa Bay Buccaneers, Jacksonville Jaguars, San Diego Chargers, and New England Patriots. In 1993 Philcox was starting for the Cleveland Browns in week 11 against Seattle. On the first play of the game Philcox fumbled the ball; it was recovered by Seattle and was run in for a Seahawks touchdown. It was the fastest score in franchise history for Seattle. Philcox finished 4 for 8 and passed for 49 yards and had one interception in 1991. Philcox would go on to play two more seasons for Clevelend. He never fully recovered from a broken thumb in September 1992.
