= Paul Green (American football) =

American football player (born 1966)

No. 83, 86, 87, 85
- Position: Tight end

Personal information
- Born: October 8, 1966 (age 60); Coalinga, California, U.S.
- Listed height: 6 ft 3 in (1.91 m)
- Listed weight: 236 lb (107 kg)

Career information
- High school: Clovis West (Fresno, California)
- College: USC
- NFL draft: 1989: 8th round, 208th overall pick

Career history
- Denver Broncos (1989–1990); Sacramento Surge (1992); Seattle Seahawks (1992–1994); New Orleans Saints (1996)

Awards and highlights
- World Bowl champion (1992); First-team All-Pac-10 (1987)

Career NFL statistics
- Receptions: 69
- Receiving yards: 544
- Touchdowns: 3
- Stats at Pro Football Reference

Paul Earl Green (born October 8, 1966) is an American former professional football player who played tight end for four seasons for the Seattle Seahawks and New Orleans Saints. He was selected by the Denver Broncos in the eighth round of the 1989 NFL draft with the 208th overall pick.
