= Terrence Warren =

American football player (born 1969)

No. 88, 19, 83
- Position: Wide receiver

Personal information
- Born: August 2, 1969 (age 57); Suffolk, Virginia, U.S.
- Listed height: 6 ft 1 in (1.85 m)
- Listed weight: 205 lb (93 kg)

Career information
- College: Hampton
- NFL draft: 1993: 5th round, 114th overall pick

Career history
- Seattle Seahawks (1993–1994); San Francisco 49ers (1995)*; Jacksonville Jaguars (1995–1996); Oakland Raiders (1997)*; Toronto Argonauts (1998)
- * Offseason or practice squad member only

Career NFL statistics
- Rushing yards: 15
- Rushing average: 5
- Return yards: 417
- Stats at Pro Football Reference

Terrence Lamonte Warren (born August 2, 1969) is an American former professional football player who was a wide receiver in the National Football League (NFL) and Canadian Football League (CFL). He played college football for the Hampton Pirates.

While Warren played football at John F. Kennedy High School in Suffolk, Virginia, he became better known as a sprinter. In 1988, as a high school senior, Warren anchored the United States 400 meter relay team to a gold medal in the IAAF World Junior Track and Field Championships in Sudbury, Ontario. He played both sports at Hampton University, where he set several sprinting records and was a two-time NCAA Division II national champion in the 200 meter dash. He was selected by the Seattle Seahawks in the fifth round of the 1993 NFL draft. After two years in Seattle, he played briefly for the San Francisco 49ers. After his stint in San Francisco, he signed with the Jacksonville Jaguars, though he never played for the team due to injury. Warren was inducted into the Hampton University Athletics Hall of Fame on January 14, 2011, and the Central Intercollegiate Athletic (CIAA) Hall of Fame on February 27, 2015.
