= Rafael Robinson =

American football player (born 1969)

No. 37, 21, 22
- Position: Defensive back

Personal information
- Born: June 19, 1969 (age 57); Marshall, Texas, U.S.
- Listed height: 5 ft 11 in (1.80 m)
- Listed weight: 200 lb (91 kg)

Career information
- High school: Jefferson High School (Jefferson, Texas)
- College: Wisconsin
- NFL draft: 1992: undrafted

Career history
- Seattle Seahawks (1992–1995); Houston / Tennessee Oilers (1996–1997); BC Lions (1998–2000)

Career NFL statistics
- Tackles: 186
- Interceptions: 2
- Sacks: 1.5
- Stats at Pro Football Reference

Rafael Robinson (born June 19, 1969) is an American former professional football player who was a defensive back in the National Football League (NFL). He was signed by the Seattle Seahawks as an undrafted free agent in 1992. He played college football for the Wisconsin Badgers.

Robinson also played for the Houston / Tennessee Oilers.
