= Mike Keim =

American football player (born 1965)

No. 78
- Position: Tackle

Personal information
- Born: November 12, 1965 (age 60); Anaheim, California, U.S.
- Listed height: 6 ft 7 in (2.01 m)
- Listed weight: 302 lb (137 kg)

Career information
- High school: Round Valley (Eagar, Arizona)
- College: BYU
- NFL draft: 1991: undrafted

Career history
- New Orleans Saints (1991); Seattle Seahawks (1992–1995); San Francisco 49ers (1997)*
- * Offseason or practice squad member only

Awards and highlights
- Second-team All-WAC (1990)
- Stats at Pro Football Reference

Mike Keim (born November 12, 1965, in Anaheim, California) is an American former professional football player who was a tackle for five seasons with the New Orleans Saints and Seattle Seahawks of the National Football League (NFL). He played college football for the BYU Cougars.
