= Rod Stephens =

American football player (born 1966)

No. 50, 94, 99
- Position: Linebacker

Personal information
- Born: June 14, 1966 (age 60); Atlanta, Georgia, U.S.
- Listed height: 6 ft 1 in (1.85 m)
- Listed weight: 231 lb (105 kg)

Career information
- High school: North Fulton (Atlanta)
- College: Georgia Tech
- NFL draft: 1989: undrafted

Career history
- Seattle Seahawks (1989); Denver Broncos (1990)*; Seattle Seahawks (1990–1994); Washington Redskins (1995–1996)
- * Offseason or practice squad member only

Career NFL statistics
- Tackles: 538
- Forced fumbles: 11
- Sacks: 6
- Stats at Pro Football Reference

Rodrequis La'Vant Stephens (born June 14, 1966) is an American former professional football player who was a linebacker in the National Football League (NFL). He played college football for the Georgia Tech Yellow Jackets. He played in the NFL for the Seattle Seahawks from 1989 to 1994 and Washington Redskins from 1995 to 1996.
