= Bob Spitulski =

American football player (born 1969)

No. 55, 58
- Position: Linebacker

Personal information
- Born: September 10, 1969 (age 57); Toledo, Ohio, U.S.
- Listed height: 6 ft 3 in (1.91 m)
- Listed weight: 240 lb (109 kg)

Career information
- High school: Bishop Moore
- College: UCF
- NFL draft: 1992: 3rd round, 66th overall pick

Career history
- Seattle Seahawks (1992–1995)

Awards and highlights
- UCF Athletic Hall of Fame (2009)

Career NFL statistics
- Tackles: 49
- Sacks: 3
- Interceptions: 1
- Stats at Pro Football Reference

Bob Spitulski (born September 10, 1969) is an American former professional football player who was a linebacker for the Seattle Seahawks and the St. Louis Rams in the National Football League.

Spitulski attended the University of Central Florida and was selected in the third round of the 1992 NFL draft by the Seattle Seahawks.
