= Antonio Edwards =

American football player (born 1970)

No. 67, 94, 95, 96, 76
- Position: Defensive end

Personal information
- Born: March 10, 1970 (age 56); Moultrie, Georgia, U.S.
- Listed height: 6 ft 3 in (1.91 m)
- Listed weight: 271 lb (123 kg)

Career information
- High school: Colquitt County
- College: Valdosta State
- NFL draft: 1993: 8th round, 204th overall pick

Career history
- Seattle Seahawks (1993–1997); New York Giants (1997); Atlanta Falcons (1998); Carolina Panthers (1999); Denver Broncos (2000)*; Las Vegas Outlaws (2001)
- * Offseason or practice squad member only

Career NFL statistics
- Tackles: 119
- Sacks: 16
- Fumble recoveries: 2
- Stats at Pro Football Reference

Antonio Edwards (born March 10, 1970) is an American former professional football player who was a defensive end in the National Football League (NFL) for the Seattle Seahawks, the New York Giants, Atlanta Falcons, and Carolina Panthers. He played college football for the Valdosta State Blazers and was selected in eighth round of the 1993 NFL draft. In 2000, Edwards was the twelfth pick of the XFL draft as a member of the Las Vegas Outlaws. Edwards is currently the defensive line coach of the Collegiate School in Richmond, Virginia.

== Early life ==
Edwards attended Colquitt County High School in Moultrie, Georgia, and was a student and a letterman in football.

== Personal life ==
Edwards was a criminal justice major at Valdosta State University. While a member of the Seahawks, Antonio sponsored a reading enrichment program and helped build a playground at Brighton Elementary School in Seattle. He has a son Amahn and a daughter named Ashanti.
