= James Atkins (offensive tackle) =

American football player (born 1970)

No. 74
- Position: Guard

Personal information
- Born: January 28, 1970 (age 56); Amite, Louisiana, U.S.
- Listed height: 6 ft 6 in (1.98 m)
- Listed weight: 306 lb (139 kg)

Career information
- High school: Woodland (LA)
- College: Louisiana–Lafayette
- NFL draft: 1993: undrafted

Career history
- Houston Oilers (1993)*; Seattle Seahawks (1993–1997); Baltimore Ravens (1998–1999); Detroit Lions (2000)
- * Offseason or practice squad member only

Career NFL statistics
- Games played: 63
- Games started: 45
- Fumble recoveries: 4
- Stats at Pro Football Reference

James Curtis Atkins (born January 28, 1970) is an American former professional football player who was a guard in the National Football League (NFL). He played college football for the Louisiana–Lafayette Ragin' Cajuns. He played in the NFL for the Seattle Seahawks, Baltimore Ravens, and Detroit Lions.
