= Clarence Shelmon =

American football player and coach (born 1952)

Personal information
- Born: September 17, 1952 (age 74); Bossier City, Louisiana

Career information
- College: Houston

Career history
- University of Houston (1975–1976) Graduate assistant; Army (1979–1980) Running backs/tight ends; University of Indiana (1981–1983) Running backs; University of Arizona (1984–1986) Running backs; University of Southern California (1987–1990) Running backs; Los Angeles Rams (1991) Running backs; Seattle Seahawks (1992–1997) Running backs; Dallas Cowboys (1998–2001) Running backs; San Diego Chargers (2002–2006) Running backs; San Diego Chargers (2007–2009) Offensive coordinator
- Coaching profile at Pro Football Reference

Clarence Shelmon (born September 17, 1952 in Bossier City, Louisiana) is the former offensive coordinator for the National Football League San Diego Chargers.

Shelmon prepped at Airline High School and continued on to play college football at the University of Houston, where he lettered twice as a running back and graduated with a bachelor's degree in education. Shelmon also attended Long Island University where he worked toward a master's degree in guidance and counseling.

On the college level, Shelmon was an assistant coach for the University of Southern California. He also coached at the University of Arizona, Indiana University, Army, and the University of Houston. He then moved on to be the running backs coach for the Chargers, Dallas Cowboys, Seattle Seahawks and Los Angeles Rams. He was officially named the Chargers' offensive coordinator on January 27, 2007, replacing former coordinator Cam Cameron who was hired as the head coach of the Miami Dolphins. On January 10, 2012, Shelmon announced his retirement from football.
