= Tracy Johnson (American football) =

American football player (1966–2023)

No. 45, 43
- Position: Running back

Personal information
- Born: November 29, 1966; Concord, North Carolina, U.S.
- Died: April 7, 2023 (aged 56)
- Listed height: 6 ft 0 in (1.83 m)
- Listed weight: 234 lb (106 kg)

Career information
- High school: A.L. Brown (Kannapolis, North Carolina)
- College: Clemson
- NFL draft: 1989: 10th round, 271st overall pick

Career history
- Houston Oilers (1989); Atlanta Falcons (1990–1991); Seattle Seahawks (1992–1995); Tampa Bay Buccaneers (1996); Detroit Lions (1997)*
- * Offseason or practice squad member only

Career NFL statistics
- Rushing yards: 228
- Rushing average: 3.8
- Receptions: 28
- Receiving yards: 218
- Total touchdowns: 8
- Stats at Pro Football Reference

Tracy Illya Johnson (November 29, 1966 – April 7, 2023) was an American professional football running back in the National Football League (NFL). He was selected 271st overall by the Houston Oilers in the tenth round of the 1989 NFL draft.

Johnson attended Kings Mountain High School (1982–1984), before transferring to A.L. Brown High School for his senior season.

Johnson died of cancer on April 7, 2023, at the age of 56.
