= 1991 Seattle Seahawks season =

American football team season

- Owner: Ken Behring
- General manager: Tom Flores
- Head coach: Chuck Knox
- Offensive coordinator: John Becker
- Defensive coordinator: Tom Catlin
- Home stadium: Kingdome

Results
- Record: 7–9
- Division place: 4th AFC West
- Playoffs: Did not qualify
- All-Pros: DT Cortez Kennedy (2nd team)
- Pro Bowlers: FB John Williams; DT Cortez Kennedy

The 1991 Seattle Seahawks season was the team's 16th season with the National Football League (NFL). The 1991 season was the last season for head coach Chuck Knox, who left to become head coach of the Los Angeles Rams while president and general manager Tom Flores replaced him.

The Seahawks defense, led by future hall of Famer Cortez Kennedy, finished 8th on the season in both yards and scoring. This season was the last time a team played the same team in back to back games until the 2021 season when the Cleveland Browns played the Baltimore Ravens back to back, with a bye week in between.

== Offseason ==
=== NFL draft ===
1991 Seattle Seahawks draft
Round	Pick	Player	Position	College	Notes
1	16	Dan McGwire	Quarterback	San Diego State	
2	51	Doug Thomas	Wide receiver	Clemson	
3	74	David Daniels	Wide receiver	Penn State	
4	98	John Kasay *	Placekicker	Georgia	
5	128	Harlan Davis	Cornerback	Tennessee	
6	155	Michael Sinclair *	Defensive end	Eastern New Mexico	
10	266	Erik Ringoen	Linebacker	Hofstra	
11	297	Tony Stewart	Running back	Iowa	
12	324	Ike Harris	Guard	South Carolina	
Made roster * Made at least one Pro Bowl during career

=== Undrafted free agents ===
1991 undrafted free agents of note
Player	Position	College
Derwin Brewer	Wide Receiver	Middle Tennessee
Chris Bromley	Center	Florida
Robert Chirico	Defensive end	Colorado State
Douglas Craft	Safety	Southern
Stacy Danley	Running back	Auburn
Malcolm Frank	Cornerback	Baylor
Murray Garrett	Defensive tackle	Eastern New Mexico
Howard Gasser	Quarterback	UTEP
Calvin Griggs	Wide receiver	Washington State
Martin Hochertz	Defensive end	Southern Illinois
Matt Keller	Guard	Michigan State
Nick Mazzoli	Wide receiver	Simon Fraser
Curtis McManus	Wide receiver	Purdue
Mark Moore	Defensive tackle	Tennessee
Shawn Purter	Safety	Ohio
Bill Ragans	Safety	Florida State
Aaron Ruffin	Cornerback	Nicholls State
Turnell Sims	Guard	Syracuse
James Speer	Linebacker	Florida
Willie Thomas	Cornerback	Penn State
Alex Waits	Punter	Texas
Cecil Wilson	Fullback	Oklahoma State

== Personnel ==
=== Staff ===
1991 Seattle Seahawks staff
**Front office**: Owner – Ken Behring; President/general manager – Tom Flores; Vice president/assistant general manager – Chuck Allen; Vice president of finance – Mickey Loomis; Player personnel director – Mike Allman; Pro personnel director – Randy Mueller; Assistant player personnel director – Rick Thompson; **Head coaches**: Head coach – Chuck Knox; Assistant head coach – Tom Catlin; **Offensive coaches**: Offensive coordinator/receivers – John Becker; Quarterbacks – Ken Meyer; Offensive backs – Chick Harris; Tight ends – Russ Purnell; Offensive line – Kent Stephenson	**Defensive coaches**: Defensive coordinator/linebackers – Tom Catlin; Defensive line – George Dyer; Assistant linebackers – Rusty Tillman; Defensive backs – Rod Perry; Special assignments – Joe Vitt; Staff assistant – Paul Moyer; **Special teams coaches**: Special teams – Rusty Tillman; Assistant special teams – Russ Purnell; **Strength and conditioning**: Strength and conditioning – Frank Raines

=== Final roster ===
1991 Seattle Seahawks roster
**Quarterbacks (QB)**: **17** Dave Krieg; 10 Dan McGwire; **Running backs (RB)**: **44** Derrick Fenner; 30 James Jones FB; 20 Derek Loville; 42 Chris Warren; **32** John L. Williams FB; **Wide receivers (WR)**: **89** Brian Blades; 88 Jeff Chadwick; 84 Louis Clark; 36 David Daniels; **81** Tommy Kane; 85 Doug Thomas; **Tight ends (TE)**: 86 Travis McNeal; **87** Mike Tice	**Offensive linemen (OL)**: 64 Darrick Brilz G; **66** Andy Heck T; **76** Bill Hitchcock T; 63 Ronnie Lee T; **71** Bryan Millard G; 73 Curt Singer G; 56 Joe Tofflemire C; **74** Warren Wheat G; **Defensive linemen (DL)**: **77** Jeff Bryant DE; **79** Jacob Green DE; **96** Cortez Kennedy DT; 72 Joe Nash DT; 91 Jim Skow DE; **57** Tony Woods DE	**Linebackers (LB)**: 59 Joe Cain OLB; **53** Darren Comeaux MLB; **97** Rufus Porter OLB; 94 Rod Stephens MLB; **90** Terry Wooden OLB; 92 Dave Wyman MLB; **Defensive backs (DB)**: **25** Robert Blackmon SS; 34 Brian Davis CB; 23 Harlan Davis CB; 33 Dedrick Dodge FS; 22 Nesby Glasgow SS; **29** Dwayne Harper CB; **27** Patrick Hunter CB; 26 James Jefferson CB; **41** Eugene Robinson FS; **Special teams (ST)**: 83 Trey Junkin LS; 4 John Kasay K; 14 Rick Tuten P	**Practice squad**: 61 Theo Adams C; **Reserve**: 65 Edwin Bailey G (IR); 51 Marcus Cotton LB (IR); 3 Rick Donnelly P (IR); **54** Grant Feasel C (IR); 78 Eric Hayes DE (IR); 31 Vann McElroy S (IR); 58 Richard Newbill LB (IR); 70 Michael Sinclair DE (IR); 11 Kelly Stouffer QB (IR); Rookies in italics 47 active, 9 reserve, 1 practice squad

- Starters in bold.
- (*) Denotes players that were selected for the 1992 Pro Bowl.

== Schedule ==
=== Preseason ===
Week	Date	Opponent	Result	Record	Game site	Recap
1	August 3	Phoenix Cardinals	**L** 13–31	0–1	Kingdome	Recap
2	August 10	at Indianapolis Colts	**W** 17–7	1–1	Hoosier Dome	Recap
3	August 17	at Los Angeles Rams	**W** 23–7	2–1	Anaheim Stadium	Recap
4	August 23	San Francisco 49ers	**L** 16–28	2–2	Kingdome	Recap

Source: Seahawks Media Guides

=== Regular season ===
Divisional matchups have the AFC West playing the NFC West.

Week	Date	Opponent	Result	Record	Game site	Recap
1	September 1	at New Orleans Saints	**L** 24–27	0–1	Louisiana Superdome	Recap
2	September 8	New York Jets	**W** 20–13	1–1	Kingdome	Recap
3	September 15	at **Denver Broncos**	**L** 10–16	1–2	Mile High Stadium	Recap
4	September 22	at **Kansas City Chiefs**	**L** 13–20	1–3	Arrowhead Stadium	Recap
5	September 29	Indianapolis Colts	**W** 31–3	2–3	Kingdome	Recap
6	October 6	at Cincinnati Bengals	**W** 13–7	3–3	Riverfront Stadium	Recap
7	October 13	**Los Angeles Raiders**	**L** 20–23 (OT)	3–4	Kingdome	Recap
8	October 20	at Pittsburgh Steelers	**W** 27–7	4–4	Three Rivers Stadium	Recap
9	October 27	**San Diego Chargers**	**W** 20–9	5–4	Kingdome	Recap
10	Bye					
11	November 10	at **San Diego Chargers**	**L** 14–17	5–5	Jack Murphy Stadium	Recap
12	November 17	at **Los Angeles Raiders**	**L** 7–31	5–6	Los Angeles Memorial Coliseum	Recap
13	November 24	**Denver Broncos**	**W** 13–10	6–6	Kingdome	Recap
14	December 1	**Kansas City Chiefs**	**L** 6–19	6–7	Kingdome	Recap
15	December 8	San Francisco 49ers	**L** 22–24	6–8	Kingdome	Recap
16	December 15	at Atlanta Falcons	**L** 13–26	6–9	Atlanta–Fulton County Stadium	Recap
17	December 22	Los Angeles Rams	**W** 23–9	7–9	Kingdome	Recap
Note: Intra-division opponents are in **bold** text.

Source: 1991 NFL season results

== Standings ==
AFC West
	W	L	T	PCT	DIV	CONF	PF	PA	STK
^{(2)} Denver Broncos	12	4	0	.750	5–3	10–4	304	235	W4
^{(4)} Kansas City Chiefs	10	6	0	.625	6–2	8–4	322	252	W1
^{(5)} Los Angeles Raiders	9	7	0	.563	5–3	7–5	298	297	L3
Seattle Seahawks	7	9	0	.438	2–6	6–6	276	261	W1
San Diego Chargers	4	12	0	.250	2–6	3–9	274	342	L1

== Game summaries ==
=== Preseason ===
==== Week P1: vs. Phoenix Cardinals ====
Preseason Week One: Seattle Seahawks vs. Phoenix Cardinals – Game summary

Quarter	1	2	3	4	Total
Cardinals	10	14	0	7	31
Seahawks	3	3	0	7	13

at Kingdome, Seattle

- Date: August 3
- Game time: 7:36 pm local
- Game weather: indoors
- Game attendance: 49,448
- Referee: Pat Haggerty
- Gamebook

==== Week P2: at Indianapolis Colts ====
Preseason Week Two: Seattle Seahawks at Indianapolis Colts – Game summary

Quarter	1	2	3	4	Total
Seahawks	7	7	0	3	17
Colts	0	0	7	0	7

at Hoosier Dome, Indianapolis

- Date: August 10
- Game time: 7:31 pm local
- Game weather: indoors
- Game attendance: 47,943
- Referee: Stan Kemp
- Gamebook

==== Week P3: at Los Angeles Rams ====
Preseason Week Three: Seattle Seahawks at Los Angeles Rams – Game summary

Quarter	1	2	3	4	Total
Seahawks	3	10	0	10	23
Rams	0	0	0	7	7

at Anaheim Stadium, Anaheim, California

- Date: August 17
- Game time: 7:05 pm local
- Game weather: clear, 70 °F (21 °C), 80% humidity, wind SW 10 miles per hour (16 km/h)
- Game attendance: 47,834
- Referee: Bernie Kukar
- Gamebook

==== Week P4: vs. San Francisco 49ers ====
Preseason Week Four: Seattle Seahawks vs. San Francisco 49ers – Game summary

Quarter	1	2	3	4	Total
49ers	7	14	0	7	28
Seahawks	3	6	0	7	16

at Kingdome, Seattle

- Date: August 23
- Game time: 5:03 pm local
- Game weather: indoors
- Game attendance: 54,111
- Referee: Howard Roe
- Gamebook

=== Regular season ===
==== Week 1: at New Orleans Saints ====
Week One: Seattle Seahawks at New Orleans – Game summary

Quarter	1	2	3	4	Total
Seahawks	0	7	17	0	24
Saints	7	13	0	7	27

at Superdome, New Orleans, Louisiana

- Date: September 1
- Game time: 12:01 pm local
- Game weather: indoors
- Game attendance: 68,492
- Referee: Bernie Kukar
- TV: NBC
- Gamebook

Game information

First quarter

- NO – Gill Fenerty 50-yard pass from Bobby Hebert (Morten Andersen kick), 10:54 (NO 7–0)

Second quarter

- NO – Morten Andersen 47-yard field goal, 13:59 (NO 10–0)
- NO – Pat Swilling 39-yard interception return (Morten Andersen kick), 13:36 (NO 17–0)
- SEA – Brian Blades 10-yard pass from Dave Krieg (John Kasay kick), 8:29 (NO 17–7)
- NO – Morten Andersen 31-yard field goal, 3:26 (NO 20–7)

Third quarter

- SEA – Brian Blades 25-yard pass from Dave Krieg (John Kasay kick), 12:22 (NO 20–14)
- SEA – John Kasay 37-yard field goal, 8:29 (NO 20–17)
- SEA – Brian Davis 40-yard interception return (John Kasay kick), 0:14 (SEA 24–20)

Fourth quarter

- NO – Floyd Turner 20-yard pass from Bobby Hebert (Morten Andersen kick), 1:11 (NO 27–24)

Top passers

- SEA – Dave Krieg: 26/35, 274 yds, 2 TD, 2 INT
- NO – Bobby Hebert: 18/29, 226 yds, 2 TD, 2 INT

Top rushers

- SEA – John L. Williams: 6 car, 22 yds
- NO – Dalton Hilliard: 9 car, 18 yds

Top receivers

- SEA – Brian Blades: 12 rec, 160 yds, 2 TD
- NO – Gill Fenerty: 3 rec, 66 yds, 1 TD

Team – pass – rush – total – to

- SEA – 302 – 46 – 348 – 4
- NO – 201 – 43 – 244 – 3

==== Week 2: vs. New York Jets ====
Week Two: Seattle Seahawks vs. New York Jets – Game summary

Quarter	1	2	3	4	Total
Jets	0	3	0	10	13
Seahawks	0	3	17	0	20

at Kingdome, Seattle

- Date: September 8
- Game time: 1:03 pm local
- Game weather: indoors
- Game attendance: 56,770
- Referee: Pat Haggerty
- TV: NBC
- Gamebook

Game information

First quarter

- No scoring plays

Second quarter

- NYJ – Pat Leahy 29-yard field goal, 14:00 (NYJ 3–0)
- SEA – John Kasay 23-yard field goal, 0:00 (Tied 3–3)

Third quarter

- SEA – John Kasay 34-yard field goal, 8:53 (SEA 6–3)
- SEA – Travis McNeal 12-yard pass from Jeff Kemp (John Kasay kick), 8:07 (SEA 13–3)
- SEA – Tommy Kane 12-yard pass from Jeff Kemp (John Kasay kick), 5:40 (SEA 20–3)

Fourth quarter

- NYJ – Pat Leahy 30-yard field goal, 14:31 (SEA 20–6)
- NYJ – Rob Moore 6-yard pass from Troy Taylor (Pat Leahy kick), 1:14 (SEA 20–13)

Top passers

- NYJ – Ken O'Brien: 13/29, 128 yds, 2 INT
- SEA – Jeff Kemp: 18/29, 193 yds, 2 TD, 2 INT

Top rushers

- NYJ – Johnny Hector: 8 car, 55 yds
- SEA – Derrick Fenner: 14 car, 34 yds

Top receivers

- NYJ – Rob Moore: 6 rec, 98 yds, 1 TD
- SEA – Brian Blades: 4 rec, 53 yds

Team – pass – rush – total – to

- NYJ – 158 – 158 – 316 – 4
- SEA – 193 – 97 – 290 – 2

==== Week 3: at Denver Broncos ====
Week Three: Seattle Seahawks at Denver Broncos – Game summary

Quarter	1	2	3	4	Total
Seahawks	0	0	0	10	10
Broncos	0	10	3	3	16

at Mile High Stadium, Denver, Colorado

- Date: September 15
- Game time: 2:00 pm local
- Game weather: clear, 64 °F (18 °C), 28% humidity, wind W 3 miles per hour (4.8 km/h)
- Game attendance: 74,152
- Referee: Red Cashion
- TV announcers (NBC): Don Criqui and Bob Trumpy
- Gamebook

Game information

First quarter

- No scoring plays

Second quarter

- DEN – David Treadwell 17-yard field goal, 10:57 (DEN 3–0)
- DEN – Ricky Nattiel 61-yard pass from John Elway (David Treadwell kick), 2:00 (DEN 10–0)

Third quarter

- DEN – David Treadwell 25-yard field goal, 11:33 (DEN 13–0)

Fourth quarter

- DEN – David Treadwell 35-yard field goal, 14:05 (DEN 16–0)
- SEA – John Kasay 28-yard field goal, 7:30 (DEN 16–3)
- SEA – Derrick Fenner 1-yard run (John Kasay kick), 4:04 (DEN 16–10)

Top passers

- SEA – Jeff Kemp: 21/50, 322 yds, 2 INT
- DEN – John Elway: 19/32, 252 yds, 1 TD

Top rushers

- SEA – John L. Williams: 7 car, 26 yds
- DEN – Gaston Green: 25 car, 92 yds

Top receivers

- SEA – Tommy Kane: 6 rec, 122 yds
- DEN – Ricky Nattiel: 2 rec, 67 yds, 1 TD

Team – pass – rush – total – to

- SEA – 312 – 50 – 362 – 4
- DEN – 246 – 99 – 345 – 2

==== Week 4: at Kansas City Chiefs ====
Week Four: Seattle Seahawks at Kansas City Chiefs – Game summary

Quarter	1	2	3	4	Total
Seahawks	0	0	3	10	13
Chiefs	0	10	0	10	20

at Arrowhead Stadium, Kansas City, Missouri

- Date: September 22
- Game time: 3:01 pm local
- Game weather: overcast, 62 °F (17 °C), 60% humidity, wind NW 10 miles per hour (16 km/h)
- Game attendance: 71,789
- Referee: Dale Hamer
- TV: NBC
- Gamebook

Game information

First quarter

- No scoring plays

Second quarter

- KC – Nick Lowery 37-yard field goal, 14:33 (KC 3–0)
- KC – Tim Barnett 12-yard pass from Steve DeBerg (Nick Lowery kick), 9:49 (KC 10–0)

Third quarter

- SEA – John Kasay 45-yard field goal, 2:57 (KC 10–3)

Fourth quarter

- KC – Nick Lowery 9-yard field goal, 14:53 (KC 13–3)
- KC – Harvey Williams 15-yard pass from Steve DeBerg (Nick Lowery kick), 9:31 (KC 20–3)
- SEA – John Kasay 38-yard field goal, 6:27 (KC 20–6)
- SEA – Derrick Fenner 1-yard run (John Kasay kick), 1:39 (KC 20–13)

Top passers

- SEA – Jeff Kemp: 18/30, 232 yds, 2 INT
- KC – Steve DeBerg: 21/32, 214 yds, 2 TD

Top rushers

- SEA – Derrick Fenner: 15 car, 76 yds, 1 TD
- KC – Christian Okoye: 16 car, 79 yds

Top receivers

- SEA – Brian Blades: 8 rec, 97 yds
- KC – Robb Thomas: 4 rec, 57 yds

Team – pass – rush – total – to

- SEA – 208 – 170 – 378 – 4
- KC – 214 – 98 – 312 – 0

==== Week 5: vs. Indianapolis Colts ====
Week Five: Seattle Seahawks vs. Indianapolis Colts – Game summary

Quarter	1	2	3	4	Total
Colts	0	3	0	0	3
Seahawks	7	10	7	7	31

at Kingdome, Seattle

- Date: September 29
- Game time: 1:02 pm local
- Game weather: indoors
- Game attendance: 56,656
- Referee: Dick Hantak
- TV: NBC
- Gamebook

Game information

First quarter

- SEA – John L. Williams 6-yard run (John Kasay kick), 9:50 (SEA 7–0)

Second quarter

- SEA – John Kasay 41-yard field goal, 8:16 (SEA 10–0)
- SEA – Chris Warren 59-yard punt return (John Kasay kick), 5:49 (SEA 17–0)
- IND – Dean Biasucci 54-yard field goal, 1:49 (SEA 17–3)

Third quarter

- SEA – Tommy Kane 7-yard pass from Jeff Kemp (John Kasay kick), 9:16 (SEA 24–3)

Fourth quarter

- SEA – Derrick Fenner 10-yard run (John Kasay kick), 12:53 (SEA 31–3)

Top passers

- IND – Jeff George: 17/31, 144 yds, 2 INT
- SEA – Jeff Kemp: 7/10, 56 yds, 1 TD

Top rushers

- IND – Eric Dickerson: 13 car, 42 yds
- SEA – John L. Williams: 17 car, 80 yds, 1 TD

Top receivers

- IND – Clarence Verdin: 4 rec, 44 yds
- SEA – John L. Williams: 5 rec, 41 yds

Team – pass – rush – total – to

- IND – 95 – 42 – 137 – 3
- SEA – 83 – 168 – 251 – 3

==== Week 6: at Cincinnati Bengals ====
Week Six: Seattle Seahawks at Cincinnati Bengals – Game summary

Quarter	1	2	3	4	Total
Seahawks	7	0	6	0	13
Bengals	0	7	0	0	7

at Riverfront Stadium, Cincinnati, Ohio

- Date: October 6
- Game time: 1:01 pm local
- Game weather: clear, 48 °F (9 °C), 47% humidity, wind NW 15 miles per hour (24 km/h)
- Game attendance: 60,010
- Referee: Tom Dooley
- TV: NBC
- Gamebook

Game information

First quarter

- SEA – John L. Williams 35-yard run (John Kasay kick), 4:46 (SEA 7–0)

Second quarter

- CIN – Eric Ball 1-yard run (Jim Breech kick), 14:09 (Tied 7–7)

Third quarter

- SEA – John Kasay 36-yard field goal, 9:39 (SEA 10–7)
- SEA – John Kasay 31-yard field goal, 6:25 (SEA 13–7)

Fourth quarter

- No scoring plays

Top passers

- SEA – Jeff Kemp: 16/31, 204 yds, 3 INT
- CIN – Boomer Esiason: 18/38, 256 yds, 2 INT

Top rushers

- SEA – John L. Williams: 10 car, 62 yds, 1 TD
- CIN – Harold Green: 15 car, 76 yds

Top receivers

- SEA – Brian Blades: 7 rec, 99 yds
- CIN – Eddie Brown: 7 rec, 117 yds

Team – pass – rush – total – to

- SEA –202 – 103 – 305 – 3
- CIN – 240 – 124 – 364 – 5

==== Week 7: vs. Los Angeles Raiders ====
Week Seven: Seattle Seahawks vs. Los Angeles Raiders – Game summary

Quarter	1	2	3	4	OT	Total
Raiders	0	0	7	13	3	23
Seahawks	3	14	0	3	0	20

at Kingdome, Seattle

- Date: October 13
- Game time: 4:36 pm local
- Game weather: indoors
- Game attendance: 61,974
- Referee: Stan Kemp
- TV announcers (TNT): Skip Caray & Pat Haden
- Gamebook

Game information

First quarter

- SEA – John Kasay 36-yard field goal, 9:31 (SEA 3–0)

Second quarter

- SEA – Louis Clark 11-yard pass from Jeff Kemp (John Kasay kick), 14:06 (SEA 10–0)
- SEA – Patrick Hunter 32-yard interception return (John Kasay kick), 2:23 (SEA 17–0)

Third quarter

- LA – Ethan Horton 8-yard pass from Jay Schroeder (Jeff Jaeger kick), 5:45 (SEA 17–7)

Fourth quarter

- LA – Jeff Jaeger 47-yard field goal, 13:48 (SEA 17–10)
- LA – Tim Brown 12-yard pass from Jay Schroeder (Jeff Jaeger kick), 6:10 (Tied 17–17)
- SEA – John Kasay 45-yard field goal, 2:04 (SEA 20–17)
- LA – Jeff Jaeger 49-yard field goal, 0:01 (Tied 20–20)

Overtime

- LA – Jeff Jaeger 37-yard field goal, 8:23 (LA 23–20)

Top passers

- LA – Jay Schroeder: 28/52, 274 yds, 2 TD, 2 INT
- SEA – Jeff Kemp: 10/25, 147 yds, 1 TD, 3 INT

Top rushers

- LA – Nick Bell: 16 car, 75 yds
- SEA – John L. Williams: 16 car, 55 yds

Top receivers

- LA – Mervyn Fernandez: 9 rec, 96 yds
- SEA – Brian Blades: 4 rec, 99 yds

Team – pass – rush – total – to

- LA – 274 – 146 – 420 – 5
- SEA – 145 – 119 – 264 – 3

==== Week 8: at Pittsburgh Steelers ====
Week Eight: Seattle Seahawks at Pittsburgh Steelers – Game summary

Quarter	1	2	3	4	Total
Seahawks	3	14	3	7	27
Steelers	0	0	7	0	7

at Three Rivers Stadium, Pittsburgh, Pennsylvania

- Date: October 20
- Game time: 1:00 pm local
- Game weather: clear, 48 °F (9 °C), 68% humidity, wind S 7 miles per hour (11 km/h)
- Game attendance: 54,678
- Referee: Gordon McCarter
- TV: NBC
- Gamebook

Game information

First quarter

- SEA – John Kasay 36-yard field goal, 2:26 (SEA 3–0)

Second quarter

- SEA – John L. Williams 1-yard run (John Kasay kick), 12:10 (SEA 10–0)
- SEA – Jeff Chadwick 14-yard pass from Dave Krieg (John Kasay kick), 0:18 (SEA 17–0)

Third quarter

- PIT – Dwight Stone 57-yard pass from Neil O'Donnell (Gary Anderson kick), 7:57 (SEA 17–7)
- SEA – John Kasay 21-yard field goal, 0:38 (SEA 20–7)

Fourth quarter

- SEA – Mike Tice 1-yard pass from Dave Krieg (John Kasay kick), 8:37 (SEA 27–7)

Top passers

- SEA – Dave Krieg: 25/31, 266 yds, 2 TD
- PIT – Neil O'Donnell: 14/22, 184 yds, 1 TD, 1 INT

Top rushers

- SEA – John L. Williams: 17 car, 43 yds, 1 TD
- PIT – Barry Foster: 7 car, 36 yds

Top receivers

- SEA – Tommy Kane: 6 rec, 102 yds
- PIT – Dwight Stone: 2 rec, 67 yds, 1 TD

Team – pass – rush – total – to

- SEA – 259 – 65 – 324 – 0
- PIT – 162 – 78 – 240 – 3

==== Week 9: vs. San Diego Chargers ====
Week Nine: Seattle Seahawks vs. San Diego Chargers – Game summary

Quarter	1	2	3	4	Total
Chargers	0	6	3	0	9
Seahawks	7	3	0	10	20

at Kingdome, Seattle

- Date: October 27
- Game time: 1:01 pm local
- Game weather: indoors
- Game attendance: 58,025
- Referee: Bernie Kukar
- TV: NBC
- Gamebook

Game information

First quarter

- SEA – Derrick Fenner 1-yard run (John Kasay kick), 8:18 (SEA 7–0)

Second quarter

- SD – John Carney 29-yard field goal, 12:13 (SEA 7–3)
- SEA – John Kasay 51-yard field goal, 9:10 (SEA 10–3)
- SD – John Carney 24-yard field goal, 0:04 (SEA 10–6)

Third quarter

- SD – John Carney 36-yard field goal, 0:19 (SEA 10–9)

Fourth quarter

- SEA – Mike Tice 5-yard pass from Dave Krieg (John Kasay kick), 11:24 (SEA 17–9)
- SEA – John Kasay 54-yard field goal, 6:05 (SEA 20–9)

Top passers

- SD – John Friesz: 27/41, 212 yds
- SEA – Dave Krieg: 13/21, 142 yds, 1 TD, 2 INT

Top rushers

- SD – Marion Butts: 23 car, 76 yds
- SEA – John L. Williams: 18 car, 66 yds

Top receivers

- SD – Anthony Miller: 8 rec, 89 yds, 2 TD
- SEA – Tommy Kane: 5 rec, 53 yds

Team – pass – rush – total – to

- SD – 192 – 128 – 320 – 0
- SEA – 127 – 75 – 202 – 2

==== Week 11: at San Diego Chargers ====
Week Eleven: Seattle Seahawks at San Diego Chargers – Game summary

Quarter	1	2	3	4	Total
Seahawks	0	0	0	14	14
Chargers	7	7	0	3	17

at San Diego Stadium, San Diego, California

- Date: November 10
- Game time: 1:01 pm local
- Game weather: hazy, 71 °F (22 °C), 83% humidity, wind WSW 11 miles per hour (18 km/h)
- Game attendance: 43,597
- Referee: Dick Hantak
- TV: NBC
- Gamebook

Game information

First quarter

- SD – Marion Butts 17-yard run (John Carney kick), 9:11 (SD 7–0)

Second quarter

- SD – Marion Butts 1-yard run (John Carney kick), 9:16 (SD 14–0)

Third quarter

- No scoring plays

Fourth quarter

- SEA – John L. Williams 13-yard pass from Dave Krieg (John Kasay kick), 14:07 (SD 14–7)
- SEA – Jeff Chadwick 20-yard pass from Dave Krieg (John Kasay kick), 5:09 (Tied 14–14)
- SD – John Carney 54-yard field goal, 0:18 (SD 17–14)

Top passers

- SEA – Dave Krieg: 29/39, 379 yds, 2 TD, 1 INT
- SD – John Friesz: 17/25, 229 yds

Top rushers

- SEA – James Jones: 4 car, 22 yds
- SD – Marion Butts: 20 car, 86 yds, 2 TD

Top receivers

- SEA – Brian Blades: 8 rec, 131 yds
- SD – Anthony Miller: 5 rec, 124 yds

Team – pass – rush – total – to

- SEA – 350 – 37 – 387 – 3
- SD – 213 – 102 – 315 – 0

==== Week 12: at Los Angeles Raiders ====
Week Twelve: Seattle Seahawks at Los Angeles Raiders – Game summary

Quarter	1	2	3	4	Total
Seahawks	0	7	0	0	7
Raiders	3	21	0	7	31

at Los Angeles Memorial Coliseum, Los Angeles

- Date: November 17
- Game time: 1:02 pm local
- Game weather: overcast, 68 °F (20 °C), 60% humidity, wind W 10 miles per hour (16 km/h)
- Game attendance: 49,317
- Referee: Jerry Markbreit
- TV: NBC
- Gamebook

Game information

First quarter

- LA – Jeff Jaeger 51-yard field goal, 10:16 (LA 3–0)

Second quarter

- LA – Willie Gault 4-yard pass from Jay Schroeder (Jeff Jaeger kick), 11:46 (LA 10–0)
- LA – Andrew Glover 1-yard pass from Jay Schroeder (Jeff Jaeger kick), 6:51 (LA 17–0)
- SEA – Mike Tice 6-yard pass from Dave Krieg (John Kasay kick), 1:54 (LA 17–7)
- LA – Ethan Horton 51-yard pass from Jay Schroeder (Jeff Jaeger kick), 0:33 (LA 24–7)

Third quarter

  - No scoring plays

Fourth quarter

- LA – Napoleon McCallum 1-yard run (Jeff Jaeger kick), 14:22 (LA 31–7)

Top passers

- SEA – Dave Krieg: 18/25, 163 yds, 1 TD
- LA – Jay Schroeder: 16/19, 237 yds, 3 TD

Top rushers

- SEA – John L. Williams: 4 car, 19 yds
- LA – Marcus Allen: 9 car, 54 yds

Top receivers

- SEA – Louis Clark: 4 rec, 44 yds
- LA – Ethan Horton: 7 rec, 123 yds, 1 TD

Team – pass – rush – total – to

- SEA – 162 – 23 – 185 – 1
- LA – 226 – 116 – 342 – 1

==== Week 13: vs. Denver Broncos ====
Week Thirteen: Seattle Seahawks vs. Denver Broncos – Game summary

Quarter	1	2	3	4	Total
Broncos	0	0	10	0	10
Seahawks	3	10	0	0	13

at Kingdome, Seattle

- Date: November 24
- Game time: 1:02 pm local
- Game weather: indoors
- Game attendance: 60,430
- Referee: Stan Kemp
- TV: NBC
- Gamebook

Game information

First quarter

- SEA – John Kasay 36-yard field goal, 11:05 (SEA 3–0)

Second quarter

- SEA – Jeff Chadwick 4-yard pass from Dave Krieg (John Kasay kick), 3:46 (SEA 10–0)
- SEA – John Kasay 42-yard field goal, 0:33 (SEA 13–0)

Third quarter

- DEN – Warren Powers 22-yard fumble return (David Treadwell kick), 13:08 (SEA 13–7)
- DEN – David Treadwell 23-yard field goal, 7:15 (SEA 13–10)

Fourth quarter

- No scoring plays

Top passers

- DEN – John Elway: 13/23, 132 yds, 2 INT
- SEA – Dave Krieg: 9/19, 70 yds, 1 TD, 2 INT

Top rushers

- DEN – Gaston Green: 19 car, 49 yds
- SEA – John L. Williams: 17 car, 109 yds

Top receivers

- DEN – Derek Russell: 3 rec, 34 yds
- SEA – Tommy Kane: 2 rec, 24 yds

Team – pass – rush – total – to

- DEN – 112 – 98 – 210 – 4
- SEA – 53 – 146 – 199 – 4

==== Week 14: vs. Kansas City Chiefs ====
Week Fourteen Seattle Seahawks vs. Kansas City Chiefs – Game summary

Quarter	1	2	3	4	Total
Chiefs	3	6	3	7	19
Seahawks	3	0	0	3	6

at Kingdome, Seattle

- Date: December 1
- Game time: 1:01 pm local
- Game weather: indoors
- Game attendance: 57,248
- Referee: Pat Haggerty
- TV: NBC
- Gamebook

Game information

First quarter

- SEA – John Kasay 19-yard field goal, 8:03 (SEA 3–0)
- KC – Nick Lowery 20-yard field goal, 3:53 (Tied 3–3)

Second quarter

- KC – Nick Lowery 28-yard field goal, 9:59 (KC 6–3)
- KC – Nick Lowery 36-yard field goal, 3:33 (KC 9–3)

Third quarter

- KC – Nick Lowery 39-yard field goal, 8:43 (KC 12–3)

Fourth quarter

- KC – Pete Holohan 8-yard pass from Steve DeBerg (Nick Lowery kick), 7:43 (KC 19–3)
- SEA – John Kasay 26-yard field goal, 5:13 (KC 19–6)

Top passers

- KC – Steve DeBerg: 17/26, 154 yds, 1 TD
- SEA – Dave Krieg: 16/25, 263 yds, 1 INT

Top rushers

- KC – Barry Word: 26 car, 96 yds
- SEA – John L. Williams: 7 car, 20 yds

Top receivers

- KC – Emile Harry: 6 rec, 51 yds
- SEA – Travis McNeal: 4 rec, 66 yds

Team – pass – rush – total – to

- KC – 154 – 157 – 311 – 0
- SEA – 226 – 47 – 273 – 2

==== Week 15: vs. San Francisco 49ers ====
Week Fifteen: Seattle Seahawks vs. San Francisco 49ers – Game summary

Quarter	1	2	3	4	Total
49ers	0	10	7	7	24
Seahawks	6	3	7	6	22

at Kingdome, Seattle

- Date: December 8
- Game time: 1:02 pm local
- Game weather: indoors
- Game attendance: 56,711
- Referee: Howard Roe
- TV announcers (CBS): Tim Ryan & Irv Cross
- Gamebook

Game information

First quarter

- SEA – James Jones 1-yard run (PAT failed), 5:44 (SEA 6–0)

Second quarter

- SF – Harry Sydney 3-yard pass from Steve Bono (Mike Cofer field goal, 8:34 (SF 7–6)
- SEA – John Kasay 27-yard field goal, 2:27 (SEA 9–7)
- SF – Mike Cofer 50-yard field goal, 1:02 (SF 10–9)

Third quarter

- SF – Jerry Rice 9-yard pass from Steve Bono (Mike Cofer kick), 13:10 (SF 17–9)
- SEA – John L. Williams 5-yard run (John Kasay kick), 1:05 (SF 17–16)

Fourth quarter

- SEA – John Kasay 25-yard field goal, 12:21 (SEA 19–17)
- SEA – John Kasay 38-yard field goal, 6:15 (SEA 22–17)
- SF – John Taylor 15-yard pass from Steve Bono (Mike Cofer kick), 1:08 (SF 24–22)

Top passers

- SF – Steve Bono: 25/44, 280 yds, 3 TD, 2 INT
- SEA – Dave Krieg: 16/28, 128 yds

Top rushers

- SF – Harry Sydney: 2 car, 31 yds
- SEA – John L. Williams: 16 car, 66 yds, 1 TD

Top receivers

- SF – John Taylor: 7 rec, 113 yds, 1 TD
- SEA – John L. Williams: 6 rec, 44 yds

Team – pass – rush – total – to

- SF – 261 – 68 – 329 – 5
- SEA – 128 – 150 – 278 – 2

==== Week 16: at Atlanta Falcons ====
Week Sixteen: Seattle Seahawks at Atlanta Falcons – Game summary

Quarter	1	2	3	4	Total
Seahawks	0	0	3	10	13
Falcons	2	10	7	7	26

at Atlanta–Fulton County Stadium, Atlanta

- Date: December 15
- Game time: 1:01 pm local
- Game weather: clear, 47 °F (8 °C), 25% humidity, wind N 12 miles per hour (19 km/h)
- Game attendance: 53,834
- Referee: Tom Dooley
- TV: NBC
- Gamebook

Game information

First quarter

- ATL – Safety, Brian Jordan tackled Kelly Stouffer in end zone, 9:58 (ATL 2–0)

Second quarter

- ATL – Norm Johnson 42-yard field goal, 12:31 (ATL 5–0)
- ATL – George Thomas 4-yard pass from Chris Miller (Norm Johnson kick), 4:41 (ATL 12–0)

Third quarter

- ATL – Deion Sanders 48-yard interception return (Norm Johnson kick), 8:56 (ATL 19–0)
- SEA – John Kasay 43-yard field goal, 3:38 (ATL 19–3)

Fourth quarter

- SEA – John Kasay 43-yard field goal, 12:41 (ATL 19–6)
- ATL – Michael Haynes 18-yard pass from Chris Miller (Norm Johnson kick), 8:16 (ATL 26–6)
- SEA – Louis Clark 24-yard pass from Dave Krieg (John Kasay kick), 1:03 (ATL 26–13)

Top passers

- SEA – Dave Krieg: 22/35, 231 yds, 1 TD, 2 INT
- ATL – Chris Miller: 14/27, 160 yds, 2 TD

Top rushers

- SEA – James Jones: 6 car, 19 yds
- ATL – Mike Rozier: 11 car, 49 yds

Top receivers

- SEA – Louis Clark: 4 rec, 61 yds, 1 TD
- ATL – Michael Haynes: 4 rec, 60 yds, 1 TD

Team – pass – rush – total – to

- SEA – 202 – 33 – 235 – 3
- ATL – 140 – 131 – 271 – 1

==== Week 17: vs. Los Angeles Rams ====
Week Seventeen: Seattle Seahawks vs. Los Angeles Rams – Game summary

Quarter	1	2	3	4	Total
Rams	3	6	0	0	9
Seahawks	0	7	16	0	23

at Kingdome, Seattle

- Date: December 22
- Game time: 5:04 pm local
- Game weather: indoors
- Game attendance: 51,100
- Referee: Jerry Markbreit
- TV announcers (ESPN): Mike Patrick & Joe Theismann
- Gamebook

Game information

First quarter

- LA – Tony Zendejas 44-yard field goal, 1:02 (LA 3–0)

Second quarter

- LA – Tony Zendejas 46-yard field goal, 9:08 (LA 6–0)
- SEA – Mike Tice 4-yard pass from Dave Krieg (John Kasay kick), 1:28 (SEA 7–6)
- LA – Tony Zendejas 50-yard field goal, 0:06 (LA 9–7)

Third quarter

- SEA – John Kasay 35-yard field goal, 12:11 (SEA 10–9)
- SEA – James Jones 1-yard run (John Kasay kick), 9:10 (SEA 17–9)
- SEA – James Jones 6-yard run (PAT failed), 5:51 (SEA 23–9)

Fourth quarter

- No scoring plays

Top passers

- LA – Jim Everett: 12/27, 118 yds, 2 INT
- SEA – Dave Krieg: 13/27, 164 yds, 1 TD, 2 INT

Top rushers

- LA – Cleveland Gary: 16 car, 72 yds
- SEA – James Jones: 10 car, 50 yds, 2 TD

Top receivers

- LA – Henry Ellard: 3 rec, 43 yds
- SEA – Brian Blades: 6 rec, 85 yds

Team – pass – rush – total – to

- LA – 131 – 96 – 227 – 3
- SEA – 156 – 97 – 253 – 3
