= 1990 Seattle Seahawks season =

American football team season

- Owner: Ken Behring
- General manager: Tom Flores
- Head coach: Chuck Knox
- Offensive coordinator: John Becker
- Defensive coordinator: Tom Catlin
- Home stadium: Kingdome

Results
- Record: 9–7
- Division place: 3rd AFC West
- Playoffs: Did not qualify
- All-Pros: None
- Pro Bowlers: FB John Williams

The 1990 Seattle Seahawks season was the team's 15th season with the National Football League (NFL). The team improved on its 7–9 record from 1989, finishing 9–7. Despite the winning record, the team missed the postseason.

Seattle would start the season 0–3 before abandoning the run and shoot offense installed before the season and returning to the "Ground Chuck" Offense. Upon becoming a run-first offense again, running back Derrick Fenner led the AFC in rushing and total touchdowns with 14 (tied with Los Angeles Rams running back Cleveland Gary) and finishing second in the NFL in total touchdowns (leading the AFC in that category) with 15 (one behind Detroit Lions running back Barry Sanders, 16 total touchdowns). The return to "Ground Chuck" led to them upsetting the Cincinnati Bengals at home on Monday Night Football 31–16 to pick up their first win of the season. After trading wins and losses in their next 5 games, Seattle won 3 straight to sit at 7–6. However, a loss to the Miami Dolphins hurt the Seahawks hopes for a playoff berth. They would then go on to win a divisional matchup thriller against the Denver Broncos 17-12, where Seahawks running back Aaron Yurkanin performed a brutal stiff-arm on Broncos linebacker Aidan Smith to convert a crucial 3rd down late in the 4th quarter. The Seahawks would then defeat the Lions to finish 9–7, but were eliminated after the Houston Oilers (led by backup quarterback Cody Carlson subbing for an injured Warren Moon) defeated the Pittsburgh Steelers on the final Sunday Night Football game of 1990. Due to conference record tiebreakers, Houston's win sent the Oilers and Cincinnati Bengals to the playoffs while a Pittsburgh win would've sent the Seahawks and Steelers to the postseason. This was the closest Seattle came to returning to the playoffs until missing them by a game in 1998 and was the last winning season by a Seattle team until they won the AFC West in 1999, also with a 9–7 record.

This was the first Seahawks season without original member Steve Largent, who retired at the end of the previous season. This season is also notable for Kansas City Chiefs linebacker Derrick Thomas sacking Seahawks quarterback Dave Krieg an NFL record 7 times in a single game. Despite this the Seahawks managed to pull out the win when Krieg broke free of what would have been another Thomas sack to throw the game winning touchdown to receiver Paul Skansi.

Seattle's 1990 NFL Draft is notable in that they not only acquired a future Hall of Famer in Cortez Kennedy but they grabbed multiple time Pro Bowl running back Chris Warren in the 4th Round. Warren would play in Seattle until the end of the 1997 season becoming Seattle's all-time leading rusher on his final carry as a Seahawk, passing Seahawks Ring of Honor member Curt Warner with 6,706 to Warner's 6,705 (since broken by Shaun Alexander's 9,429 rushing yards as a Seahawk). In addition, they got Pro Bowl defensive back Robert Blackmon and defensive mainstay Terry Wooden.

== Offseason ==
=== Draft ===
1990 Seattle Seahawks draft
Round	Pick	Player	Position	College	Notes
1	3	Cortez Kennedy * ^{†}	Defensive tackle	Miami (FL)	
2	29	Terry Wooden	Linebacker	Syracuse	
2	34	Robert Blackmon	Safety	Baylor	
4	89	Chris Warren *	Running back	Ferrum	
5	119	Eric Hayes	Defensive tackle	Florida State	
6	146	Ned Bolcar	Linebacker	Notre Dame	
7	175	Bob Kula	Offensive tackle	Michigan State	
8	202	Bill Hitchcock	Offensive tackle	Purdue	
10	257	Robert Morris	Defensive end	Valdosta State	
11	286	Daryl Reed	Defensive back	Oregon	
12	312	John Gromos	Quarterback	Vanderbilt	
Made roster † Pro Football Hall of Fame * Made at least one Pro Bowl during career

=== Undrafted free agents ===
1990 undrafted free agents of note
Player	Position	College
Blake Bednarz	Guard	Syracuse
Lavent Blaylock	Cornerback	Indiana State
Dedrick Dodge	Safety	Florida State
Dewayne Fletcher	Cornerback	Toledo
Derek Horton	Cornerback	Oregon
Xavier Jordan	Linebacker	Western Kentucky
Alvin Lee	Wide receiver	LSU
Mike Lindsay	Tackle	Gardner–Webb
Derek Loville	Running back	Oregon
Donald Miller	Linebacker	Idaho State
Dave Murphy	Safety	Holy Cross
Terry Obee	Wide receiver	Oregon
Todd Oberdorf	Tackle	Indiana

== Personnel ==
=== Staff ===
1990 Seattle Seahawks staff
**Front office**: Owner – Ken Behring; President/general manager – Tom Flores; Vice president/assistant general manager – Chuck Allen; Player personnel director – Mike Allman; Assistant player personnel director – Rick Thompson; Pro personnel director – Randy Mueller; **Head coaches**: Head coach – Chuck Knox; Assistant head coach – Tom Catlin; **Offensive coaches**: Offensive coordinator/receivers – John Becker; Quarterbacks – Ken Meyer; Offensive backs – Chick Harris; Tight ends – Russ Purnell; Offensive line – Kent Stephenson	**Defensive coaches**: Defensive coordinator/linebackers – Tom Catlin; Defensive line – George Dyer; Assistant linebackers – Rusty Tillman; Defensive backs – Rod Perry; Special assignments – Joe Vitt; Staff assistant – Paul Moyer; **Special teams coaches**: Special teams – Rusty Tillman; Assistant special teams – Russ Purnell; **Strength and conditioning**: Strength and conditioning – Frank Raines

=== Final roster ===
1990 Seattle Seahawks roster
**Quarterbacks (QB)**: 15 Jeff Kemp; **17** Dave Krieg; 11 Kelly Stouffer; **Running backs (RB)**: **44** Derrick Fenner; 30 James Jones FB; 33 Derek Loville; 42 Chris Warren; **32** John L. Williams FB; **Wide receivers (WR)**: **89** Brian Blades; 88 Jeff Chadwick; 84 Louis Clark; **81** Tommy Kane; 82 Paul Skansi; **Tight ends (TE)**: 85 Ron Heller; **86** Travis McNeal; 87 Mike Tice	**Offensive linemen (OL)**: 64 Darrick Brilz G; **54** Grant Feasel C; **66** Andy Heck T; **63** Ronnie Lee T; 70 Ron Mattes T; **71** Bryan Millard G; 56 Joe Tofflemire C; 74 Warren Wheat G; **Defensive linemen (DL)**: **77** Jeff Bryant DT; **79** Jacob Green DE; 78 Eric Hayes DE/DT; 96 Cortez Kennedy DT; **72** Joe Nash DT; **57** Tony Woods DE	**Linebackers (LB)**: 51 Ty Allert MLB; 59 Joe Cain OLB; 99 Donald Miller OLB; 58 Richard Newbill MLB; 94 Rod Stephens MLB; 92 Dave Wyman MLB; **Defensive backs (DB)**: 25 Robert Blackmon SS; **22** Nesby Glasgow SS; **29** Dwayne Harper CB; **23** Patrick Hunter CB; 26 James Jefferson CB; 24 Mel Jenkins CB; 31 Vann McElroy FS; **41** Eugene Robinson FS; **Special teams (ST)**: 3 Rick Donnelly P; 9 Norm Johnson K; 83 Trey Junkin LS	**Practice squad**: 76 Bill Hitchcock T; 95 Robert Morris DE; 16 Terry Obee WR; **Reserve**: 50 Dave Ahrens LB (IR); 52 Ricky Andrews LB (IR); **65** Edwin Bailey G (IR); 55 Ned Bolcar LB (IR); **53** Darren Comeaux LB (IR); 34 Brian Davis CB (IR); 75 Chris Dyko T (IR); 23 Thom Kaumeyer S (IR); -- R. J. Kors S (IR); **97** Rufus Porter LB (IR); -- Jim Sandusky WR (IR); **90** Terry Wooden LB (IR); Rookies in italics 47 active, 12 reserve, 3 practice squad

- Starters in bold.
- (*) Denotes players that were selected for the 1991 Pro Bowl.

== Schedule ==
=== Preseason ===
Week	Date	Opponent	Result	Record	Venue	Recap
AB	August 4	Denver Broncos	**L** 10–14	0–1	(Japan) Tokyo Dome (Tokyo)	Recap
1	August 11	at Phoenix Cardinals	**W** 34–9	1–1	Sun Devil Stadium	Recap
2	August 17	Indianapolis Colts	**W** 13–10	2–1	Kingdome	Recap
3	August 24	Tampa Bay Buccaneers	**W** 10–3	3–1	Kingdome	Recap
4	August 31	at San Francisco 49ers	**W** 30–10	4–1	Candlestick Park	Recap

Source: Seahawks Media Guides

=== Regular season ===
Divisional matchups have the AFC West playing the NFC Central.

Week	Date	Opponent	Result	Record	Venue	Recap
1	September 9	at Chicago Bears	**L** 0–17	0–1	Soldier Field	Recap
2	September 16	**Los Angeles Raiders**	**L** 13–17	0–2	Kingdome	Recap
3	September 23	at **Denver Broncos**	**L** 31–34 (OT)	0–3	Mile High Stadium	Recap
4	October 1	Cincinnati Bengals	**W** 31–16	1–3	Kingdome	Recap
5	October 7	at New England Patriots	**W** 33–20	2–3	Foxboro Stadium	Recap
6	October 14	at **Los Angeles Raiders**	**L** 17–24	2–4	Los Angeles Memorial Coliseum	Recap
7	October 21	**Kansas City Chiefs**	**W** 19–7	3–4	Kingdome	Recap
8	Bye					
9	November 4	**San Diego Chargers**	**L** 14–31	3–5	Kingdome	Recap
10	November 11	at **Kansas City Chiefs**	**W** 17–16	4–5	Arrowhead Stadium	Recap
11	November 18	Minnesota Vikings	**L** 21–24	4–6	Kingdome	Recap
12	November 25	at **San Diego Chargers**	**W** 13–10 (OT)	5–6	Jack Murphy Stadium	Recap
13	December 2	Houston Oilers	**W** 13–10 (OT)	6–6	Kingdome	Recap
14	December 9	at Green Bay Packers	**W** 20–14	7–6	Milwaukee County Stadium	Recap
15	December 16	at Miami Dolphins	**L** 17–24	7–7	Joe Robbie Stadium	Recap
16	December 23	**Denver Broncos**	**W** 17–12	8–7	Kingdome	Recap
17	December 30	Detroit Lions	**W** 30–10	9–7	Kingdome	Recap
Note: Intra-division opponents are in **bold** text.

Source: 1990 NFL season results

== Standings ==
AFC West
	W	L	T	PCT	DIV	CONF	PF	PA	STK
^{(2)} Los Angeles Raiders	12	4	0	.750	6–2	9–3	337	268	W5
^{(5)} Kansas City Chiefs	11	5	0	.688	5–3	7–5	369	257	W2
Seattle Seahawks	9	7	0	.563	4–4	7–5	306	286	W2
San Diego Chargers	6	10	0	.375	2–6	5–9	315	281	L3
Denver Broncos	5	11	0	.313	3–5	4–8	331	374	W1

== Game summaries ==
Even though the Seahawks did not qualify for the playoffs, their most memorable moment during the season was in the final seconds against the Kansas City Chiefs when Dave Krieg threw a game-winning touchdown pass to Paul Skansi.

=== Preseason ===
==== Week P1: vs. Denver Broncos ====
Preseason Week One: Seattle Seahawks vs. Denver Broncos – Game summary

Quarter	1	2	3	4	Total
Broncos	0	7	0	7	14
Seahawks	0	0	10	0	10

at Tokyo Dome, Tokyo, Japan

- Date: August 5
- Game time: 11:05 am local
- Game weather: indoors
- Game attendance: 48,827
- Referee: Jim Tunney
- Gamebook

==== Week P2: at Phoenix Cardinals ====
Preseason Week Two: Seattle Seahawks at Phoenix Cardinals – Game summary

Quarter	1	2	3	4	Total
Seahawks	0	14	7	13	34
Cardinals	0	9	0	0	9

at Sun Devil Stadium, Tempe, Arizona

- Date: August 11
- Game time: 7:35 pm local
- Game weather: overcast, 99 °F (37 °C), 34% humidity, wind W 6 miles per hour (9.7 km/h)
- Game attendance: 31,316
- Referee: Pat Haggerty
- Gamebook

==== Week P3: vs. Indianapolis Colts ====
Preseason Week Three: Seattle Seahawks vs. Indianapolis Colts – Game summary

Quarter	1	2	3	4	Total
Colts	0	7	3	0	10
Seahawks	0	3	0	10	13

at Kingdome, Seattle

- Date: August 17
- Game time: 7:35 pm local
- Game weather: indoors
- Game attendance: 52,475
- Referee: Jerry Seeman
- Gamebook

==== Week P4: vs. Tampa Bay Buccaneers ====
Preseason Week Four: Seattle Seahawks vs. Tampa Bay Buccaneers – Game summary

Quarter	1	2	3	4	Total
Buccaneers	0	3	0	0	3
Seahawks	7	0	0	3	10

at Kingdome, Seattle

- Date: August 24
- Game time: 6:05 pm local
- Game weather: indoors
- Game attendance: 52,301
- Referee: Howard Roe
- Gamebook

==== Week P5: at San Francisco 49ers ====
Preseason Week Five: Seattle Seahawks at San Francisco 49ers – Game summary

Quarter	1	2	3	4	Total
Seahawks	0	20	0	10	30
49ers	0	7	3	0	10

at Candlestick Park, San Francisco

- Date: August 31
- Game time: 6:06 pm local
- Game weather: clear, 67 °F (19 °C), 49% humidity, wind N 15 miles per hour (24 km/h)
- Game attendance: 54,269
- Referee: Dick Hantak
- Gamebook

=== Regular season ===
==== Week 1: at Chicago Bears ====
Week One: Seattle Seahawks at Chicago Bears – Game summary

Quarter	1	2	3	4	Total
Seahawks	0	0	0	0	0
Bears	3	7	0	7	17

at Soldier Field, Chicago, Illinois

- Date: September 9
- Game time: 12:00 pm local
- Game weather: hazy, 76 °F (24 °C), 67% humidity, wind S 7 miles per hour (11 km/h)
- Game attendance: 64,400
- Referee: Pat Haggerty
- TV announcers (NBC): Dick Enberg & Bill Walsh
- Gamebook

Game information

First quarter

- CHI – Kevin Butler 47-yard field goal, 2:40 (CHI 3–0)

Second quarter

- CHI – Neal Anderson 17-yard run (Kevin Butler kick), 14:23 (CHI 10–0)

Third quarter

- No scoring plays

Fourth quarter

- CHI – Neal Anderson 4-yard run (Kevin Butler kick), 8:42 (CHI 17–0)

Top passers

- SEA – Dave Krieg: 12/27, 91 yds, 3 INT
- CHI – Jim Harbaugh: 21/29, 203 yds, 1 INT

Top rushers

- SEA – John L. Williams: 8 car, 45 yds
- CHI – Neal Anderson: 20 car, 101 yds, 2 TD

Top receivers

- SEA – Tommy Kane: 4 rec, 46 yds
- CHI – Dennis Gentry: 5 rec, 44 yds

Team – pass – rush – total – to

- SEA – 74 – 58 – 132 – 3
- CHI – 195 – 171 – 366 – 1

==== Week 2: vs. Los Angeles Raiders ====
Week Two: Seattle Seahawks vs. Los Angeles Raiders – Game summary

Quarter	1	2	3	4	Total
Raiders	3	0	0	14	17
Seahawks	0	3	7	3	13

at Kingdome, Seattle

- Date: September 16
- Game time: 1:02 pm local
- Game weather: indoors
- Game attendance: 61,889
- Referee: Jerry Markbreit
- TV announcers (NBC): Charlie Jones & Todd Christensen
- Gamebook

Game information

First quarter

- LA – Jeff Jaeger 47-yard field goal, 11:24 (LA 3–0)

Second quarter

- SEA – Norm Johnson 22-yard field goal, 5:08 (Tied 3–3)

Third quarter

- SEA – John L. Williams 2-yard run (Norm Johnson kick), 2:57 (SEA 10–3)

Fourth quarter

- LA – Mervyn Fernandez 12-yard pass from Jay Schroeder (Jeff Jaeger kick), 14:17 (Tied 10–10)
- SEA – Norm Johnson 19-yard field goal, 6:07 (LA 3–0)
- LA – Greg Bell 1-yard run (Jeff Jaeger kick), 1: 26 (LA 17–10)

Top passers

- LA – Jay Schroeder: 10/17, 236 yds, 1 TD
- SEA – Dave Krieg: 19/24, 225 yds, 1 INT

Top rushers

- LA – Greg Bell: 10 car, 40 yds, 1 TD
- SEA – John L. Williams: 18 car, 53 yds, 1 TD

Top receivers

- LA – Mervyn Fernandez: 4 rec, 93 yds, 1 TD
- SEA – Brian Blades: 3 rec, 44 yds
- SEA – John L. Williams, 5 rec, 44 yds

Team – pass – rush – total – to

- LA – 235 – 91 – 326 – 0
- SEA – 222 – 122 – 344 – 1

==== Week 3: at Denver Broncos ====
Week Three: Seattle Seahawks at Denver Broncos – Game summary

Quarter	1	2	3	4	OT	Total
Seahawks	7	7	10	7	0	31
Broncos	14	14	3	0	3	34

at Mile High Stadium, Denver, Colorado

- Date: September 23
- Game time: 1:00 pm local
- Game weather: clear, 72 °F (22 °C), 30% humidity, wind E 6 miles per hour (9.7 km/h)
- Game attendance: 75,290
- Referee: Red Cashion
- TV announcers (NBC): Fred Roggin & Todd Christensen
- Gamebook

Game information

First quarter

- SEA – Derrick Fenner 4-yard run (Norm Johnson kick), 8:14 (SEA 7–0)
- DEN – Mark Jackson 6-yard pass from John Elway (David Treadwell kick), 2:25 (Tied 7–7)
- DEN – Karl Mecklenburg 2-yard fumble return (David Treadwell kick), 1:28 (DEN 14–7)

Second quarter

- SEA – Derrick Fenner 2-yard run (Norm Johnson kick), 9:31 (Tied 14–14)
- DEN – Mark Jackson 29-yard pass from John Elway (David Treadwell kick), 1:54 (DEN 21–14)
- DEN – Mel Bratton 1-yard pass from John Elway (David Treadwell kick), 0:18 (DEN 28–14)

Third quarter

- SEA – Norm Johnson 39-yard field goal, 5:40 (DEN 28–17)
- SEA – Ron Heller 2-yard pass from Dave Krieg (Norm Johnson kick), 1:48 (DEN 28–24)

Fourth quarter

- DEN – David Treadwell 27-yard field goal, 7:08 (DEN 31–24)
- SEA – Derrick Fenner 4-yard run (Norm Johnson kick), 2:47 (Tied 31–31)

Overtime

- DEN – David Treadwell 25-yard field goal, 5:46 (DEN 34–31)

Top passers

- SEA – Dave Krieg: 20/28, 213 yds, 1 TD
- DEN – John Elway: 30/40, 297 yds, 3 TD

Top rushers

- SEA – Derrick Fenner: 22 car, 144 yds, 3 TD
- DEN – Bobby Humphrey: 25 car, 129 yds

Top receivers

- SEA – John L. Williams: 6 rec, 53 yds
- SEA – Travis McNeal: 3 rec, 53 yds
- DEN – Vance Johnson: 9 rec, 120 yds

Team – pass – rush – total – to

- SEA – 185 – 184 – 369 – 3
- DEN – 281 – 141 – 422 – 1

==== Week 4: vs. Cincinnati Bengals ====
Week Four: Seattle Seahawks vs. Cincinnati Bengals – Game summary

Quarter	1	2	3	4	Total
Bengals	0	6	3	7	16
Seahawks	3	7	7	14	31

at Kingdome, Seattle

- Date: October 1
- Game time: 6:00 pm local
- Game weather: indoors
- Game attendance: 60,135
- Referee: Jerry Seeman
- TV announcers (ABC): Frank Gifford, Al Michaels, Dan Dierdorf
- Gamebook

Game information

First quarter

- SEA – Norm Johnson 51-yard field goal, 5:06 (SEA 3–0)

Second quarter

- CIN – Jim Breech 34-yard field goal, 13:30 (Tied 3–3)
- SEA – Derrick Fenner 4-yard run (Norm Johnson kick), 4:48 (SEA 10–3)
- CIN – Jim Breech 26-yard field goal, 0:02 (SEA 10–6)

Third quarter

- SEA – Derrick Fenner 3-yard run (Norm Johnson kick), 5:48 (SEA 17–6)
- CIN – Jim Breech 43-yard field goal, 2:59 (SEA 17–9)

Fourth quarter

- SEA – Tommy Kane 63-yard pass from Dave Krieg (Norm Johnson kick), 14:51 (SEA 24–9)
- CIN – Mitchell Price 66-yard punt return (Jim Breech kick), 9:49 (SEA 24–16)
- SEA – Derrick Fenner 2-yard pass from Dave Krieg (Norm Johnson kick), 3:50 (SEA 31–16)

Top passers

- CIN – Boomer Esiason: 10/23, 128 yds, 1 INT
- SEA – Dave Krieg: 17/24, 217 yds, 2 TD, 1 INT

Top rushers

- CIN – Harold Green: 6 car, 39 yds
- SEA – John L. Williams: 12 car, 73 yds

Top receivers

- CIN – Eddie Brown: 2 rec, 38 yds
- SEA – Tommy Kane: 3 rec, 78 yds, 1 TD

Team – pass – rush – total – to

- CIN – 161 –69 – 230 – 2
- SEA –201 – 151 – 352 – 2

==== Week 5: at New England Patriots ====
Week Five: Seattle Seahawks at New England Patriots – Game summary

Quarter	1	2	3	4	Total
Seahawks	13	6	0	14	33
Patriots	3	7	7	3	20

at Sullivan Stadium, Foxborough, Massachusetts

- Date: October 7
- Game time: 1:00 pm local
- Game weather: clear, 81 °F (27 °C), 69% humidity, wind SW 15 miles per hour (24 km/h)
- Game attendance: 39,735
- Referee: Tom Dooley
- TV announcers (NBC): Don Criqui & Bob Trumpy
- Gamebook

Game information

First quarter

- SEA – Derrick Fenner 5-yard run (PAT failed), 12:46 (SEA 6–0)
- SEA – Tommy Kane 20-yard pass from Dave Krieg (Norm Johnson kick), 8:51 (SEA 13–0)
- NE – Jason Staurovsky 53-yard field goal, 3:03 (SEA 13–3)

Second quarter

- SEA – Norm Johnson 31-yard field goal, 11:12 (SEA 16–3)
- SEA – Norm Johnson 19-yard field goal, 1:52 (SEA 19–3)
- NE – Brent Williams 45-yard fumble return (Jason Staurovsky kick), 0:22 (SEA 19–10)

Third quarter

- NE – Hart Lee Dykes 35-yard pass from Marc Wilson (Jason Staurovsky kick), 11:08 (SEA 19–17)

Fourth quarter

- NE – Jason Staurovsky 48-yard field goal, 12:53 (NE 20–19)
- SEA – Jeff Chadwick 45-yard pass from Dave Krieg (Norm Johnson kick), 2:37 (SEA 26–20)
- SEA – Derrick Fenner 5-yard run (Norm Johnson kick), 2:13 (SEA 33–20)

Top passers

- SEA – Dave Krieg: 17/25, 254 yds, 2 TD, 1 INT
- NE – Marc Wilson: 20/33, 227 yds, 1 TD, 2 INT

Top rushers

- SEA – Derrick Fenner: 19 car, 77 yds, 2 TD
- NE – John Stephens: 14 car, 43 yds

Top receivers

- SEA – John L. Williams: 4 rec, 74 yds
- NE – Hart Lee Dykes: 5 rec, 103 yds, 1 TD

Team – pass – rush – total – to

- SEA – 227 – 111 – 338 – 2
- NE – 213 – 61 – 274 – 5

==== Week 6: at Los Angeles Raiders ====
Week Six: Seattle Seahawks at Los Angeles Raiders – Game summary

Quarter	1	2	3	4	Total
Seahawks	0	14	3	0	17
Raiders	7	14	0	3	24

at Los Angeles Memorial Coliseum, Los Angeles

- Date: October 14
- Game time: 1:00 pm local
- Game weather: hazy, 74 °F (23 °C), 64% humidity, wind SW 6 miles per hour (9.7 km/h)
- Game attendance: 50,624
- Referee: Dick Hantak
- TV announcers (NBC): Charlie Jones & Todd Christensen
- Gamebook

Game information

First quarter

- LA – Steve Smith 1-yard pass from Jay Schroeder (Jeff Jaeger kick), 6:49 (LA 7–0)

Second quarter

- LA – Mervyn Fernandez 3-yard pass from Jay Schroeder (Jeff Jaeger kick), 12:01 (LA 14–0)
- LA – Ethan Horton 3-yard pass from Jay Schroeder (Jeff Jaeger kick), 4:13 (LA 21–0)
- SEA – Paul Skansi 5-yard pass from Dave Krieg (Norm Johnson kick), 1:31 (LA 21–7)
- SEA – Tommy Kane 31-yard pass from Dave Krieg (Norm Johnson kick), 0:24 (LA 21–14)

Third quarter

- SEA – Norm Johnson 34-yard field goal, 1:34 (LA 21–17)

Fourth quarter

- LA – Jeff Jaeger 22-yard field goal, 10:31 (LA 24–17)

Top passers

- SEA – Dave Krieg: 22/36, 294 yds, 2 TD
- LA – Jay Schroeder: 19/26, 235 yds, 3 TD

Top rushers

- SEA – John L. Williams: 9 car, 42 yds
- LA – Marcus Allen: 12 car, 41 yds

Top receivers

- SEA – Derrick Fenner: 5 rec, 85 yds
- LA – Willie Gault: 5 rec, 73 yds

Team – pass – rush – total – to

- SEA – 265 – 77 – 342 – 2
- LA – 227 – 78 – 305 – 1

==== Week 7: vs. Kansas City Chiefs ====
Week Seven: Seattle Seahawks vs. Kansas City Chiefs – Game summary

Quarter	1	2	3	4	Total
Chiefs	0	7	0	0	7
Seahawks	0	3	3	13	19

at Kingdome, Seattle

- Date: October 21
- Game time: 1:02 pm local
- Game weather: indoors
- Game attendance: 60,358
- Referee: Howard Roe
- TV announcers (NBC): Jim Donovan & Joe Namath
- Gamebook

Game information

First quarter

- No scoring plays

Second quarter

- KC – J.J. Birden 33-yard pass from Steve DeBerg (Nick Lowery kick), 0:58 (KC 7–0)
- SEA – Norm Johnson 39-yard field goal, 0:00 (KC 7–3)

Third quarter

- SEA – Norm Johnson 27-yard field goal, 2:06 (KC 7–6)

Fourth quarter

- SEA – Norm Johnson 39-yard field goal, 9:25 (SEA 9–7)
- SEA – Norm Johnson 43-yard field goal, 3:00 (SEA 12–7)
- SEA – John L. Williams 4-yard run (Norm Johnson kick), 1:54 (SEA 19–7)

Top passers

- KC – Steve DeBerg: 23/34, 213 yds, 1 TD
- SEA – Dave Krieg: 13/35, 132 yds, 4 INT

Top rushers

- KC – Barry Word: 7 car, 35 yds
- SEA – Derrick Fenner: 15 car, 75 yds

Top receivers

- KC – Stephone Paige: 9 rec, 80 yds
- SEA – John L. Williams: 4 rec, 52 yds

Team – pass – rush – total – to

- KC – 179 – 69 – 248 – 3
- SEA – 124 – 136 – 260 – 4

==== Week 9: vs. San Diego Chargers ====
Week Nine: Seattle Seahawks vs. San Diego Chargers – Game summary

Quarter	1	2	3	4	Total
Chargers	7	7	17	0	31
Seahawks	0	7	0	7	14

at Kingdome, Seattle

- Date: November 4
- Game time: 1:02 pm local
- Game weather: indoors
- Game attendance: 59,646
- Referee: Red Cashion
- TV announcers (NBC): Tom Hammond & Joe Namath
- Gamebook

Game information

First quarter

- SD – Ronnie Harmon 11-yard pass from Billy Joe Tolliver (John Carney kick), 9:44 (SD 7–0)

Second quarter

- SEA – John L. Williams 21-yard run (Norm Johnson kick), 13:29 (Tied 7–7)
- SD – Quinn Early 45-yard pass from Billy Joe Tolliver (John Carney kick), 10:29 (SD 14–7)

Third quarter

- SD – John Carney 20-yard field goal, 6:02 (SD 17–7)
- SD – Nate Lewis 63-yard punt return (John Carney kick), 0:43 (SD 24–7)
- SD – Les Miller recovered fumble in end zone (John Carney kick), 0:11 (SD 31–7)

Fourth quarter

- SEA – Brian Blades 18-yard pass from Dave Krieg (Norm Johnson kick), 4:41 (SD 31–14)

Top passers

- SD – Billy Joe Tolliver: 11/24, 145 yds, 2 TD
- SEA – Dave Krieg: 15/31, 183 yds, 1 TD, 1 INT

Top rushers

- SD – Rod Bernstine: 19 car, 61 yds
- SEA – John L. Williams: 6 car, 33 yds, 1 TD

Top receivers

- SD – Quinn Early: 3 rec, 55 yds, 1 TD
- SEA – Tommy Kane: 6 rec, 97 yds

Team – pass – rush – total – to

- SD – 145 – 144 – 289 – 0
- SEA – 129 – 65 – 194 – 3

==== Week 10: at Kansas City Chiefs ====
Week Ten: Seattle Seahawks at Kansas City Chiefs – Game summary

Quarter	1	2	3	4	Total
Seahawks	0	3	7	7	17
Chiefs	0	6	10	0	16

at Arrowhead Stadium, Kansas City, Missouri

- Date: November 11
- Game time: 12:00 pm local
- Game weather: clear, 63 °F (17 °C), 50% humidity, wind SW 15 miles per hour (24 km/h)
- Game attendance: 71,285
- Referee: Tom White
- TV announcers (NBC): Jim Donovan & Paul Maguire
- Gamebook

Game information

First quarter

- No scoring plays

Second quarter

- KC – Nick Lowery 25-yard field goal, 13:02 (KC 3–0)
- SEA – Norm Johnson 43-yard field goal, 7:53 (Tied 3–3)
- KC – Nick Lowery 30-yard field goal, 0:07 (KC 6–3)

Third quarter

- SEA – Jeff Chadwick 54-yard pass from Dave Krieg (Norm Johnson kick), 12:33 (SEA 10–6)
- KC – Nick Lowery 24-yard field goal, 2:46 (SEA 10–9)
- KC – Dan Saleaumua recovered fumble in end zone (Nick Lowery kick), 1:35 (KC 16–10)

Fourth quarter

- SEA – Paul Skansi 25-yard pass from Dave Krieg (Norm Johnson kick), 0:00 (KC 17–16)

Top passers

- SEA – Dave Krieg: 16/30, 124 yds
- KC – Steve DeBerg: 16/23, 306 yds, 2 TD

Top rushers

- SEA – John L. Williams: 10 car, 36 yds
- KC – Christian Okoye: 21 car, 85 yds

Top receivers

- SEA – John L. Williams: 4 rec, 89 yds, 1 TD
- KC – Robb Thomas: 7 rec, 53 yds

Team – pass – rush – total – to

- SEA – 236 – 61 – 297 – 2
- KC – 115 – 114 – 229 – 0

==== Week 11: vs. Minnesota Vikings ====
Week Eleven: Seattle Seahawks vs. Minnesota Vikings – Game summary

Quarter	1	2	3	4	Total
Vikings	7	7	0	10	24
Seahawks	7	7	0	7	21

at Kingdome, Seattle

- Date: November 18
- Game time: 1:02 pm local
- Game weather: indoors
- Game attendance: 59,735
- Referee: Pat Haggerty
- TV announcers (CBS): Jim Henderson & Hank Stram
- Gamebook

Game information

First quarter

- SEA – Brian Blades 9-yard pass from Dave Krieg (Norm Johnson kick), 5:57 (SEA 7–0)
- MIN – Hassan Jones 8-yard pass from Rich Gannon (Fuad Reveiz kick), 0:54 (Tied 7–7)

Second quarter

- MIN – Anthony Carter 11-yard pass from Rich Gannon (Fuad Reveiz kick), 7:47 (MIN 14–7)
- SEA – Brian Blades 5-yard pass from Dave Krieg (Norm Johnson kick), 0:58 (Tied 14–14)

Third quarter

- No scoring plays

Fourth quarter

- SEA – Derrick Fenner 1-yard run (Norm Johnson kick), 7:02 (SEA 21–14)
- MIN – Herschel Walker 58-yard run (Fuad Reveiz kick), 2:28 (Tied 21–21)
- MIN – Fuad Reveiz 24-yard field goal, 0:00 (MIN 24–21)

Top passers

- MIN – Rich Gannon: 19/33, 177 yds, 2 TD
- SEA – Dave Krieg: 13/28, 138 yds, 2 TD, 1 INT

Top rushers

- MIN – Herschel Walker: 16 car, 99 yds, 1 TD
- SEA – Derrick Fenner: 15 car, 54 yds, 1 TD

Top receivers

- MIN – Anthony Carter: 5 rec, 49 yds, 1 TD
- SEA – Brian Blades: 5 rec, 50 yds, 2 TD

Team – pass – rush – total – to

- MIN – 161 – 141 – 302 – 1
- SEA – 132 – 101 – 233 – 1

==== Week 12: at San Diego Chargers ====
Week Twelve: Seattle Seahawks at San Diego Chargers – Game summary

Quarter	1	2	3	4	OT	Total
Seahawks	0	3	0	7	3	13
Chargers	0	3	7	0	0	10

at San Diego Stadium, San Diego, California

- Date: November 25
- Game time: 5:01 pm local
- Game weather: hazy, 67 °F (19 °C), 62% humidity, wind WNW 14 miles per hour (23 km/h)
- Game attendance: 50,097
- Referee: Dale Hamer
- TV announcers (ESPN): Mike Patrick & Joe Theismann
- Gamebook

Game information

First quarter

- No scoring plays

Second quarter

- SD – John Carney 20-yard field goal, 2:56 (SD 3–0)
- SEA – Norm Johnson 26-yard field goal, 0:05 (Tied 3–3)

Third quarter

- SD – Arthur Cox 19-yard pass from Billy Joe Tolliver (John Carney kick), 5:43 (SD 10–3)

Fourth quarter

- SEA – Derrick Fenner 1-yard run (Norm Johnson kick), 4:17 (Tied 10–10)

Overtime

- SEA – Norm Johnson 40-yard field goal, 11:59 (SEA 13–10)

Top passers

- SEA – Dave Krieg: 18/26, 211 yds
- SD – Billy Joe Tolliver: 15/22, 145 yds, 1 TD, 2 INT

Top rushers

- SEA – John L. Williams: 10 car, 27 yds, 1 TD
- SD – Marion Butts: 28 car, 128 yds

Top receivers

- SEA – John L. Williams: 9 rec, 110 yds
- SD – Arthur Cox: 6 rec, 53 yds, 1 TD

Team – pass – rush – total – to

- SEA – 175 – 58 – 233 – 2
- SD – 140 – 164 – 304 – 5

==== Week 13: vs. Houston Oilers ====
Week Thirteen: Seattle Seahawks vs. Houston Oilers – Game summary

Quarter	1	2	3	4	OT	Total
Oilers	0	3	0	7	0	10
Seahawks	0	7	3	0	3	13

at Kingdome, Seattle

- Date: December 2
- Game time: 1:02 pm local
- Game weather: indoors
- Game attendance: 57,592
- Referee: Howard Roe
- TV announcers (NBC): Charlie Jones & Todd Christensen
- Gamebook

Game information

First quarter

- No scoring plays

Second quarter

- HOU – Teddy Garcia 29-yard field goal, 7:23 (HOU 3–0)
- SEA – Chris Warren 1-yard run (Norm Johnson kick), 0:24 (SEA 7–3)

Third quarter

- SEA – Norm Johnson 39-yard field goal, 1:37 (SEA 10–3)

Fourth quarter

- HOU – Ernest Givins 2-yard pass from Warren Moon (Teddy Garcia kick), 11:14 (Tied 10–10)

Overtime

- SEA – Norm Johnson 42-yard field goal, 10:35 (SEA 13–10)

Top passers

- HOU – Warren Moon: 24/38, 232 yds, 1 TD, 1 INT
- SEA – Dave Krieg: 16/27, 168 yds, 1 INT

Top rushers

- HOU – Allen Pinkett: 8 car, 25 yds
- SEA – John L. Williams: 17 car, 53 yds

Top receivers

- HOU – Drew Hill: 5 rec, 58 yds
- SEA – Travis McNeal: 2 rec, 39 yds

Team – pass – rush – total – to

- HOU – 220 – 56 – 276 – 3
- SEA – 158 – 123 – 281 – 1

==== Week 14: at Green Bay Packers ====
Week Fourteen: Seattle Seahawks at Green Bay Packers – Game summary

Quarter	1	2	3	4	Total
Seahawks	7	10	3	0	20
Packers	0	0	0	14	14

at Milwaukee County Stadium, Milwaukee, Wisconsin

- Date: December 9
- Game time: 12:01 pm local
- Game weather: clear, 45 °F (7 °C), 55% humidity, wind SW 19 miles per hour (31 km/h)
- Game attendance: 52,015
- Referee: Bob McElwee
- TV announcers (NBC): Joel Meyers & Ahmad Rashad
- Gamebook

Game information

First quarter

- SEA – Jeff Chadwick 8-yard pass from Dave Krieg (Norm Johnson kick), 8:45 (SEA 7–0)

Second quarter

- SEA – Norm Johnson 37-yard field goal, 8:11 (SEA 10–0)
- SEA – Derrick Fenner 14-yard run (Norm Johnson kick), 1:03 (SEA 17–0)

Third quarter

- SEA – Norm Johnson 22-yard field goal, 8:40 (SEA 20–0)

Fourth quarter

- GB – Perry Kemp 13-yard pass from Blair Kiel (Chris Jacke kick), 5:35 (SEA 20–7)
- GB – Ed West 18-yard pass from Blair Kiel (Chris Jacke kick), 3:32 (SEA 20–14)

Top passers

- SEA – Dave Krieg: 11/18, 133 yds, 1 TD, 1 INT
- GB – Blair Kiel: 23/31, 198 yds, 2 TD

Top rushers

- SEA – Derrick Fenner: 20 car, 112 yds, 1 TD
- GB – Michael Haddix: 4 car, 10 yds

Top receivers

- SEA – Jeff Chadwick: 2 rec, 51 yds, 1 TD
- GB – Jeff Query: 6 rec, 57 yds

Team – pass – rush – total – to

- SEA – 133 – 158 – 291 – 2
- GB – 239 – 13 – 252 – 1

==== Week 15: at Miami Dolphins ====
Week Fifteen: Seattle Seahawks at Miami Dolphins – Game summary

Quarter	1	2	3	4	Total
Seahawks	3	7	0	7	17
Dolphins	3	14	7	0	24

at Joe Robbie Stadium, Miami

- Date: December 16
- Game time: 1:05 pm local
- Game weather: partly cloudy, 77 °F (25 °C), 60% humidity, wind E 9 miles per hour (14 km/h)
- Game attendance: 57,851
- Referee: Johnny Grier
- TV announcers (NBC): Joel Meyers & Ahmad Rashad
- Gamebook

Game information

First quarter

- SEA – Norm Johnson 24-yard field goal, 7:28 (SEA 3–3)
- MIA – Pete Stoyanovich 32-yard field goal, 1:57 (Tied 3–3)

Second quarter

- SEA – Derrick Fenner 2-yard run (Norm Johnson kick), 14:28 (SEA 10–3)
- MIA – James Pruitt 4-yard pass from Dan Marino (Pete Stoyanovich kick), 6:09 (Tied 10–10)
- MIA – Troy Stradford 6-yard run (Pete Stoyanovich kick), 1:28 (MIA 17–10)

Third quarter

- MIA – Ferrell Edmunds 11-yard pass from Dan Marino (Pete Stoyanovich kick), 0:11 (MIA 24–10)

Fourth quarter

- SEA – Jeff Chadwick 13-yard pass from Dave Krieg (Norm Johnson kick), 1:51 (MIA 24–17)

Top passers

- SEA – Dave Krieg: 21/37, 295 yds, 1 TD, 3 INT
- MIA – Dan Marino: 17/29, 250 yds, 2 TD, 1 INT

Top rushers

- SEA – John L. Williams: 10 car, 62 yds
- MIA – Sammie Smith: 17 car, 51 yds

Top receivers

- SEA – Tommy Kane: 10 rec, 162 yds
- MIA – Ferrell Edmunds: 5 rec, 76 yds, 1 TD

Team – pass – rush – total – to

- SEA – 261 – 83 – 344 – 4
- MIA – 242 – 105 – 347 – 3

==== Week 16: vs. Denver Broncos ====
Week Sixteen: Seattle Seahawks vs. Denver Broncos – Game summary

Quarter	1	2	3	4	Total
Broncos	3	7	2	0	12
Seahawks	3	7	7	0	17

at Kingdome, Seattle

- Date: December 23
- Game time: 5:05 pm local
- Game weather: indoors
- Game attendance: 55,845
- Referee: Jim Tunney
- TV announcers (ESPN): Mike Patrick & Joe Theismann
- Gamebook

Game information

First quarter

- DEN – David Treadwell 49-yard field goal, 11:19 (DEN 3–0)
- SEA – Norm Johnson 21-yard field goal, 0:18 (Tied 3–3)

Second quarter

- DEN – Bobby Humphrey 1-yard run (David Treadwell kick), 2:49 (DEN 10–3)
- SEA – Tommy Kane 5-yard pass from Dave Krieg (Norm Johnson kick), 0:42 (Tied 10–10)

Third quarter

- DEN – Safety, Dave Krieg intentional grounding in end zone, 3:29 (DEN 12–10)
- SEA – Derrick Fenner 1-yard run (Norm Johnson kick), 0:11 (SEA 17–12)

Fourth quarter

- No scoring plays

Top passers

- DEN – John Elway: 18/35, 171 yds, 2 INT
- SEA – Dave Krieg: 14/26, 109 yds, 1 TD, 1 INT

Top rushers

- DEN – Bobby Humphrey: 25 car, 91 yds, 1 TD
- SEA – Derrick Fenner: 13 car, 50 yds, 1 TD

Top receivers

- DEN – Mark Jackson: 4 rec, 55 yds
- SEA – John L. Williams: 6 rec, 35 yds

Team – pass – rush – total – to

- DEN – 145 – 101 – 246 – 2
- SEA – 103 – 110 – 213 – 1

==== Week 17: vs. Detroit Lions ====
Week Seventeen: Seattle Seahawks vs. Detroit Lions – Game summary

Quarter	1	2	3	4	Total
Lions	0	10	0	0	10
Seahawks	7	3	10	10	30

at Kingdome, Seattle

- Date: December 30
- Game time: 1:03 pm local
- Game weather: indoors
- Game attendance: 50,681
- Referee: Dick Hantak
- TV announcers (CBS): Verne Lundquist & John Madden
- Gamebook

Game information

First quarter

- SEA – Derrick Fenner 1-yard run (Norm Johnson kick), 3:01 (SEA 7–0)

Second quarter

- DET – Eddie Murray 24-yard field goal, 6:18 (SEA 7–3)
- DET – Barry Sanders 1-yard run (Eddie Murray kick), 1:54 (DET 10–7)
- SEA – Norm Johnson 43-yard field goal, 0:00 (Tied 10–10)

Third quarter

- SEA – Eugene Robinson 16-yard fumble return (Norm Johnson kick), 12:36 (SEA 17–10)
- SEA – Norm Johnson 25-yard field goal, 9:25 (SEA 20–10)

Fourth quarter

- SEA – Norm Johnson 37-yard field goal, 7:46 (SEA 23–10)
- SEA – Derrick Fenner 9-yard run (Norm Johnson kick), 4:43 (SEA 30–10)

Top passers

- DET – Rodney Peete: 11/25, 135 yds, 1 INT
- SEA – Dave Krieg: 21/33, 225 yds, 2 INT

Top rushers

- DET – Andre Ware: 1 car, 30 yds
- SEA – Derrick Fenner: 18 car, 75 yds, 2 TD

Top receivers

- DET – Robert Clark: 2 rec, 48 yds
- SEA – Tommy Kane: 6 rec, 76 yds

Team – pass – rush – total – to

- DET – 106 – 87 – 193 – 2
- SEA – 209 – 151 – 360 – 3
