= 1987 San Francisco 49ers season =

American football team season

- Owner: Edward J. DeBartolo Jr.
- General manager: John McVay
- Head coach: Bill Walsh
- Defensive coordinator: George Seifert
- Home stadium: Candlestick Park

Results
- Record: 13–2
- Division place: 1st NFC West
- Playoffs: Lost Divisional Playoffs (vs. Vikings) 24–36
- Pro Bowlers: QB Joe Montana; WR Jerry Rice; RB Roger Craig; NT Michael Carter; FS Ronnie Lott

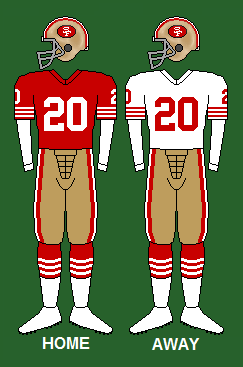

The 1987 San Francisco 49ers season was the franchise's 38th season in the National Football League and their 42nd overall. The 49ers won the division for the second consecutive season, ended the season as the top seed in the NFC and were heavily favored to represent the conference in the Super Bowl. The season ended with an upset loss to the Minnesota Vikings in the divisional round of the playoffs.

== The season ==
The 49ers lost the first game of the season to Pittsburgh. In their second game, against Cincinnati, it appeared that they were going to start the season 0–2, down by 6 points with just 2 seconds to play. However, quarterback Joe Montana threw a 25-yard pass to wide receiver Jerry Rice as time expired. The 49ers used the victory as a springboard to a 13–1 run to end the season with the best record in the NFL.

The 49ers scored 459 points, the most in the NFL in 1987; they also scored 206 more points than they allowed, best in the league as well. The 49ers gained the most total yards (5,987), the most rushing yards (2,237) and second most passing yards (3,750) in the NFL in 1987.

Wide receiver Jerry Rice was named NFL Offensive Player of the Year and the Bert Bell Award (for Player of the Year). Rice caught 22 touchdown passes in a strike-shortened 12 games (1 game was canceled because of the strike, and Rice didn't play in the next 3 games while the strike was on). This record stood for twenty years. (Note: This record was broken by Randy Moss in 2007, with his 22nd and 23rd TD receptions occurring in the 16th and final game of the season.) Rice led the league in receiving yards per game (89.8), total touchdowns (23: 22 receiving, 1 rushing), and points scored (138). Quarterback Joe Montana (who crossed the picket line during the strike) led the league with 31 touchdown passes. He also led the league in passer rating (102.1) and completion percentage (66.8%).

The San Francisco defense was also very strong, surrendering the fewest total yards (4,095), fewest passing yards (2,484) and fifth-fewest rushing yards (1,611) in the NFL in 1987. The 1987 49ers have the best passer rating differential (offensive passer rating minus opponents' combined passer rating) of the Live Ball Era (1978–present), with +52.4.

== Offseason ==
When the Tampa Bay Buccaneers selected quarterback Vinny Testaverde first overall in the 1987 NFL draft, Tampa Bay quarterback Steve Young was traded to the 49ers on April 24, 1987. The Buccaneers received 2nd and 4th round draft picks in the trade, which they used to draft Miami linebacker Winston Moss, and Arizona State wide receiver Bruce Hill.

=== NFL draft ===
- Harris Barton was the first offensive tackle selected in the first round of the NFL Draft by the 49ers since Forrest Blue was selected in 1968.

1987 San Francisco 49ers draft
| Round | Pick | Player | Position | College | Notes |
| 1 | 22 | Harris Barton * | Tackle | North Carolina | |
| 1 | 25 | Terrence Flagler | Running back | Clemson | |
| 2 | 37 | Jeff Bregel | Guard | USC | |
| 5 | 134 | Paul Jokisch | Wide receiver | Michigan | |
| 6 | 162 | Bob White | Linebacker | Penn State | |
| 7 | 189 | Steve DeLine | Kicker | Colorado State | |
| 8 | 217 | David Grayson | Linebacker | Fresno State | |
| 9 | 245 | Jonathan Shelley | Defensive back | Ole Miss | |
| 10 | 275 | John Paye | Quarterback | Stanford | |
| 11 | 301 | Calvin Nicholas | Wide receiver | Grambling State | |
Made roster † Pro Football Hall of Fame * Made at least one Pro Bowl during career

== Personnel ==
=== Staff ===
1987 San Francisco 49ers staff
| Front office: Owner – Edward J. DeBartolo, Jr.; President – Bill Walsh; Vice president/general counsel – Carmen Policy; Vice president/general manager – John McVay; Administrator of football operations – Neal Dahlen; Director of college scouting – Tony Razzano; Director of pro personnel – Allan Webb; Executive administrative assistant – Norb Hecker; Head coaches: Head coach – Bill Walsh; Offensive coaches: Quarterbacks – Mike Holmgren; Running backs – Sherman Lewis; Receivers – Dennis Green; Offensive line – Bobb McKittrick | Defensive coaches: Defensive coordinator – George Seifert; Defensive line – Fred von Appen; Linebackers – Bill McPherson; Defensive backs – Ray Rhodes; Defensive assistant – Tommy Hart; Special teams coaches: Special teams – Lynn Stiles; Strength and conditioning: Physical development coordinator – Jerry Attaway |

=== NFL replacement players ===
After the league decided to use replacement players during the NFLPA strike, the following team was assembled:

1987 San Francisco 49ers replacement roster
| Quarterbacks: 7 Mark Stevens; 10 Ed Blount; 11 Bob Gagliano; 15 Paul Berner; 16 Joe Montana; Running backs: 23 Tony Cherry; 24 Harry Sydney FB; 24 Bernard Moore; 25 Doug DuBose; 25 Del Rodgers; 28 Joe Cribbs; 28 Don Roberts; 33 Roger Craig; 35 James Mackey; 47 Andre Hardy; 48 Mike Varajon; 83 Carl Monroe; Wide receivers: 17 Tony Gladney; 29 Terry Greer; 32 Ray Brown; 82 Kevin Collins; 83 Carl Monroe; 84 Dennis Allen; 84 Thomas Henley; 86 Thai Ivory; 86 James Hardy; 87 Dwight Clark; 88 Jeff Tiefenthaller; Tight ends: 40 Mike Wells; 47 Chris Dressel; 81 Russ Francis; 89 Ron Heller; 90 Darren Long | Offensive linemen: 51 Michael Durette; 60 Chuck Thomas C; 62 Kevin Lamar; 63 Tracy Franz LT; 65 Tom Long; 65 Kevin Reach; 66 Mark Cochran; 66 Limbo Parks; 78 Gary Hoffman; Defensive linemen: 61 Joe Drake; 64 Mike Durrette; 67 Pete Kugler LDE; 75 Greg Lifer; 76 Dwaine Board RDE; 76 Terry Jackson; 79 Glenn Collins; 92 Reno Patterson; 93 Clyde Glover; 94 Bob Standifar; 96 Elston Ridgle; 97 Doug Mikolas NT | Linebackers: 51 Carl Keever; 52 George Cooper LOLB; 54 Ron Hadley LILB; 56 Darren Comeaux; 56 Steve Meadow; 57 Tom Cousineau RILB; 59 Keith Browner; 58 James Johnson; 90 Kevin Thompson; 90 Mark Korff; 98 Jerry Keeble ROLB; 99 Greg Wilks; Defensive backs: 20 Kevin Pollard; 21 Eric Wright; 22 Jonathon Shelley; 25 Del Rodgers; 26 John Butler; 31 Derrick Martin; 36 Darryl Pollard LCB; 43 Dana McLemore RCB; 43 John Sullivan; 45 Matt Courtney; 47 John Faylor FS; 49 Jeff Fuller SS; Special teams: 5 Jeff Brockhaus K; 6 Louis Berry P; 9 Jim Asmus P |

=== Roster ===
1987 San Francisco 49ers roster
| Quarterbacks (QB): 11 Bob Gagliano; 16 Joe Montana; 8 Steve Young; Running backs (RB): 33 Roger Craig; 28 Joe Cribbs; 32 Terrence Flagler; 44 Tom Rathman; 24 Harry Sydney; Wide receivers (WR): 87 Dwight Clark; 84 Ken Margerum; 80 Jerry Rice; 82 John Taylor; 85 Mike Wilson; Tight ends (TE): 86 John Frank; 89 Ron Heller; 88 Brent Jones | Offensive linemen (OL): 79 Harris Barton T; 69 Bruce Collie G; 51 Randy Cross C/G; 77 Bubba Paris T; 56 Fred Quillan C; 61 Jesse Sapolu G; 60 Chuck Thomas C; 74 Steve Wallace T; Defensive linemen (DL): 76 Dwaine Board DE; 95 Michael Carter NT; 75 Kevin Fagan DE; 93 Clyde Glover DE; 94 Charles Haley DE; 67 Pete Kugler DE; 97 Doug Mikolas NT; 92 Larry Roberts DE; 72 Jeff Stover DE | Linebackers (LB): 56 Darren Comeaux ILB; 51 George Cooper OLB; 50 Riki Ellison ILB; 55 Jim Fahnhorst ILB; 53 Milt McColl OLB; 90 Todd Shell OLB; 99 Michael Walter ILB; Defensive backs (DB): 29 Don Griffin CB; 49 Jeff Fuller SS; 46 Tom Holmoe FS; 42 Ronnie Lott FS; 22 Tim McKyer CB; 43 Dana McLemore CB; 20 Tory Nixon CB; 27 Carlton Williamson SS; Special teams (ST): 4 Max Runager P; 14 Ray Wersching K | Reserve: 65 Jeff Bregel G (IR); 57 Tom Cousineau LB (IR); 83 Derrick Crawford WR (IR); 57 Kevin Dean LB (IR); 25 Doug DuBose RB (IR); 71 Keith Fahnhorst T (IR); 54 Ron Hadley LB (IR); 92 Kevin Lilly DE (IR); 62 Guy McIntyre G (IR); -- Calvin Nicholas WR (IR); 15 John Paye QB (IR); 26 Sean Thomas CB (IR); 58 Keena Turner LB (IR); 21 Eric Wright CB (IR); Rookies in italics |

== Preseason ==
| Week | Date | Opponent | Result | Record | Venue |
|---|---|---|---|---|---|
| HOF | August 8 | vs. Kansas City Chiefs | W 20–7 | 1–0 | Fawcett Stadium |
| 1 | August 15 | at Los Angeles Raiders | W 42–16 | 2–0 | Los Angeles Memorial Coliseum |
| 2 | August 22 | Dallas Cowboys | L 3–13 | 2–1 | Candlestick Park |
| 3 | August 27 | San Diego Chargers | W 17–3 | 3–1 | Candlestick Park |
| 4 | September 4 | at Seattle Seahawks | L 10–34 | 3–2 | Kingdome |

== Regular season ==
In 1987, Jerry Rice led the NFL with 22 touchdown receptions. The runner-up was Philadelphia Eagles receiver Mike Quick with 11. This marked the first time in NFL history that a category leader doubled the total of his nearest competitor.

=== Schedule ===
| Week | Date | Opponent | Result | Record | Venue | Attendance |
|---|---|---|---|---|---|---|
| 1 | September 13 | at Pittsburgh Steelers | **L** 17–30 | 0–1 | Three Rivers Stadium | 55,735 |
| 2 | September 20 | at Cincinnati Bengals | **W** 27–26 | 1–1 | Riverfront Stadium | 53,498 |
| – | September 27 | Philadelphia Eagles | **Canceled** | | | |
| 3 | October 5 | at New York Giants | **W** 41–21 | 2–1 | Giants Stadium | 16,471 |
| 4 | October 11 | at **Atlanta Falcons** | **W** 25–17 | 3–1 | Atlanta–Fulton County Stadium | 8,684 |
| 5 | October 18 | St. Louis Cardinals | **W** 34–28 | 4–1 | Candlestick Park | 38,094 |
| 6 | October 25 | at **New Orleans Saints** | **W** 24–22 | 5–1 | Louisiana Superdome | 60,497 |
| 7 | November 1 | at **Los Angeles Rams** | **W** 31–10 | 6–1 | Anaheim Stadium | 55,328 |
| 8 | November 8 | Houston Oilers | **W** 27–20 | 7–1 | Candlestick Park | 59,740 |
| 9 | November 15 | **New Orleans Saints** | **L** 24–26 | 7–2 | Candlestick Park | 60,436 |
| 10 | November 22 | at Tampa Bay Buccaneers | **W** 24–10 | 8–2 | Tampa Stadium | 63,211 |
| 11 | November 29 | Cleveland Browns | **W** 38–24 | 9–2 | Candlestick Park | 60,248 |
| 12 | December 6 | at Green Bay Packers | **W** 23–12 | 10–2 | Lambeau Field | 51,118 |
| 13 | December 14 | Chicago Bears | **W** 41–0 | 11–2 | Candlestick Park | 63,509 |
| 14 | December 20 | **Atlanta Falcons** | **W** 35–7 | 12–2 | Candlestick Park | 54,698 |
| 15 | December 27 | **Los Angeles Rams** | **W** 48–0 | 13–2 | Candlestick Park | 57,950 |
Note: Intra-division opponents are in **bold** text.

=== Game summaries ===
==== Week 2: at Cincinnati Bengals ====
| Team | 1 | 2 | 3 | 4 | Total |
|---|---|---|---|---|---|
| • **49ers** | 0 | 7 | 13 | 7 | 27 |
| Bengals | 10 | 10 | 0 | 6 | 26 |

- Date: September 20
- Location: Riverfront Stadium • Cincinnati, Ohio
- Game start: 1:00 p.m.
- Game attendance: 53,498
- Game weather: 62 °F or 16.7 °C, wind 9 miles per hour (14 km/h; 7.8 kn)
- Referee: Bob McElwee
- TV announcers (CBS): Tim Ryan and Joe Theismann

Scoring summary
| 1 | CIN | Larry Kinnebrew 2-yard run (Jim Breech kick) | Bengals 7–0 |
| 1 | CIN | Jim Breech 23-yard field goal | Bengals 10–0 |
| 2 | SF | Mike Wilson 38-yard pass from Joe Montana (Ray Wersching kick) | Bengals 10–7 |
| 2 | CIN | Rodney Holman 46-yard pass from Boomer Esiason (Jim Breech kick) | Bengals 17–7 |
| 2 | CIN | Jim Breech 42-yard field goal | Bengals 20–7 |
| 3 | SF | Jerry Rice 34-yard pass from Joe Montana (Ray Wersching kick) | Bengals 20–14 |
| 3 | SF | Ray Wersching 24-yard field goal | Bengals 20–17 |
| 3 | SF | Ray Wersching 31-yard field goal | Tie 20–20 |
| 4 | CIN | Jim Breech 41-yard field goal | Bengals 23–20 |
| 4 | CIN | Jim Breech 46-yard field goal | Bengals 26–20 |
| 4 | SF | Jerry Rice 25-yard pass from Joe Montana (Ray Wersching kick) | 49ers 27–26 |

=== Standings ===
NFC West
| | W | L | T | PCT | DIV | CONF | PF | PA | STK |
|---|---|---|---|---|---|---|---|---|---|
| San Francisco 49ers^{(1)} | 13 | 2 | 0 | .867 | 5–1 | 10–1 | 459 | 253 | W6 |
| New Orleans Saints^{(4)} | 12 | 3 | 0 | .800 | 4–1 | 8–3 | 426 | 283 | W9 |
| Los Angeles Rams | 6 | 9 | 0 | .400 | 1–5 | 5–7 | 317 | 361 | L2 |
| Atlanta Falcons | 3 | 12 | 0 | .200 | 1–4 | 3–8 | 205 | 436 | L3 |

== Postseason ==
=== Schedule ===
| Round | Date | Opponent (seed) | Result | Record | Venue |
|---|---|---|---|---|---|
| Divisional | January 9 | Minnesota Vikings (5) | L 24–36 | 0–1 | Candlestick Park |

=== Game summaries ===
==== NFC Divisional Playoffs: vs. (5) Minnesota Vikings ====
NFC Divisional Round: Minnesota Vikings at San Francisco 49ers – Game summary

| Quarter | 1 | 2 | 3 | 4 | Total |
|---|---|---|---|---|---|
| Vikings | 3 | 17 | 10 | 6 | 36 |
| 49ers | 3 | 0 | 14 | 7 | 24 |

at Candlestick Park, San Francisco, CA

- Date: January 9, 1988
- Game time: 1 p.m. PST
- Referee: Gene Barth
- TV announcers (CBS): Tim Ryan and Joe Theismann

The 13–2 49ers suffered one of the biggest upsets in playoff history as the 8–7 Vikings came into Candlestick and beat the 49ers 36–24. Vikings QB Wade Wilson threw for 298 yards, and Anthony Carter caught 10 passes for 227 yards. Joe Montana struggled so much that Steve Young came in to relieve him. Though he played better, it was not enough. The Vikings took a 20–3 halftime lead, and held on for the major upset. Vikings advance to the NFC Championship but they were defeated by the Washington Redskins 17-10

== Awards and records ==
- Jerry Rice, Franchise Record, Most Touchdowns in One Season, 23 touchdowns (22 receiving, 1 rushing)
- Jerry Rice, Franchise Record, Most Points in One Season, 138 points
- Jerry Rice, NFL Leader, 23 touchdowns
- Jerry Rice, NFL Offensive Player of the Year
- Jerry Rice, Bert Bell Award
