= Ron Heller =

Ron Heller may refer to:

- Ron Heller (offensive tackle) (born 1962), American football offensive tackle who played in the NFL, 1984–1995
- Ron Heller (tight end) (born 1963), American football tight end who played in the NFL, 1987–1992
