= List of Seattle Seahawks first-round draft picks =

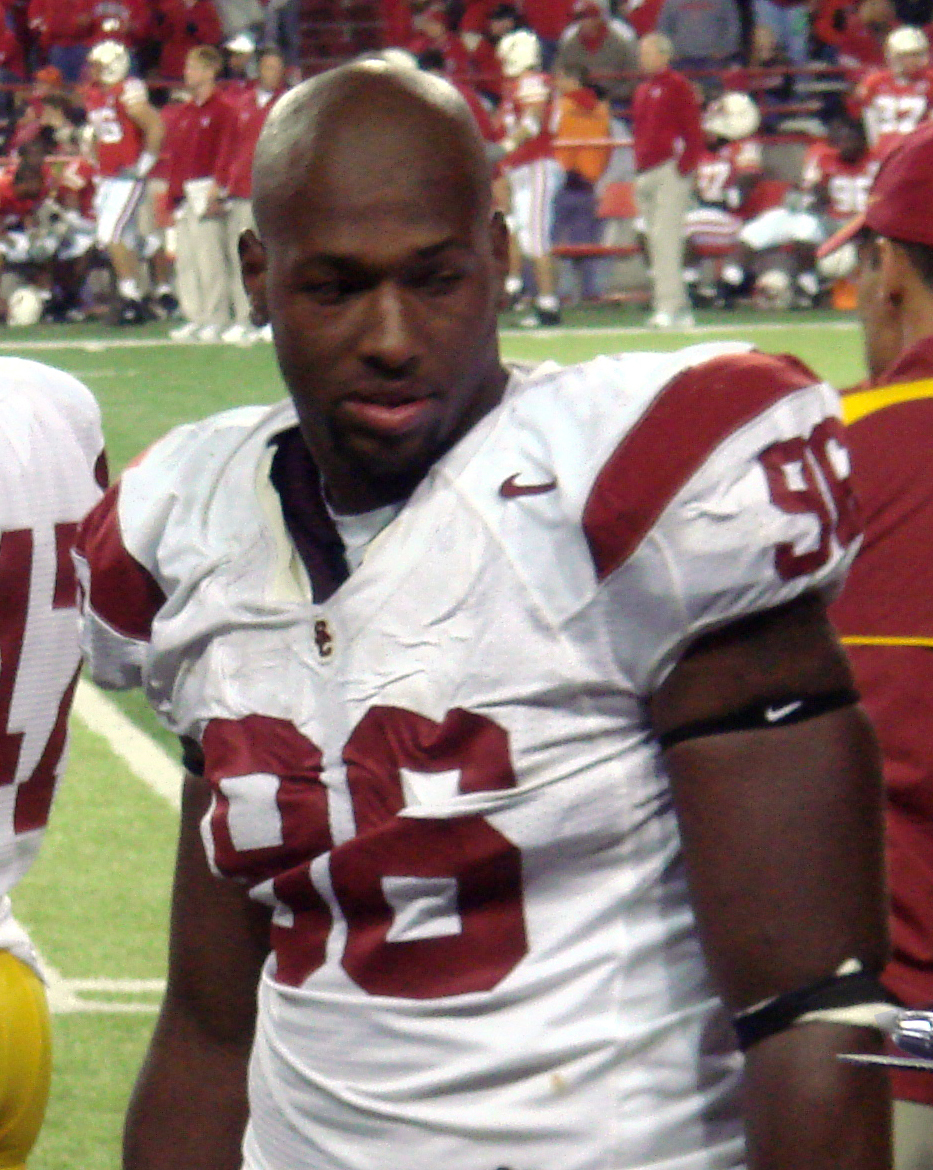
Lawrence Jackson, Seattle's 2008 first-round pick.

The Seattle Seahawks joined the National Football League (NFL) in 1976 with the Tampa Bay Buccaneers. They participated in their first draft, the 1976 NFL draft and selected Steve Niehaus, a defensive tackle from Notre Dame. The team's most recent first-round selection was in 2026, which was the selection of Jadarian Price, a running back.

Every year during April, each NFL franchise seeks to add new players to its roster through a collegiate draft known as "the NFL Annual Player Selection Meeting", which is more commonly known as the NFL Draft. Teams are ranked in inverse order based on the previous season's record, with the worst record picking first, and the second worst picking second and so on. The two exceptions to this order are made for teams that appeared in the previous Super Bowl; the Super Bowl champion always picks 32nd, and the Super Bowl loser always picks 31st. Teams have the option of trading away their picks to other teams for different picks, players, cash, or a combination thereof. Thus, it is not uncommon for a team's actual draft pick to differ from their assigned draft pick, or for a team to have extra or no draft picks in any round due to these trades.

The Seahawks have never selected the number one overall pick in any draft, although they have selected the second overall pick twice, the third overall pick three times and the fourth overall pick twice. The team's four selections from Notre Dame are the most chosen by the Seahawks from one university.

== Key ==
| ^ | Inducted into the Pro Football Hall of Fame |
| — | The Seahawks did not draft a player in the first round that year. |
| Year | Each year links to an article about that particular NFL Draft. |
| Pick | Indicates the number of the pick within the first round |
| Position | Indicates the position of the player in the NFL |
| College | The player's college football team |

== Player selections ==
Seattle Seahawks first-round draft picks
| Year | Pick | Player name | Position | College | Notes |
|---|---|---|---|---|---|
| 1976 | 2 | Steve Niehaus | DT | Notre Dame | |
| 1977 | 14 | Steve August | G | Tulsa | |
| 1978 | 9 | Keith Simpson | DB | Memphis State | |
| 1979 | 18 | Manu Tuiasosopo | DT | UCLA | |
| 1980 | 10 | Jacob Green | DE | Texas A&M | |
| 1981 | 4 | Kenny Easley^ | S | UCLA | |
| 1982 | 6 | Jeff Bryant | DE | Clemson | |
| 1983 | 3 | Curt Warner | RB | Penn State | |
| 1984 | 22 | Terry Taylor | CB | Southern Illinois | |
| 1985 | No pick | | | | |
| 1986 | 15 | John L. Williams | FB | Florida | |
| 1987 | 18 | Tony Woods | LB | Pittsburgh | |
| 1988 | 22 | Brian Bosworth | LB | Oklahoma | |
| 1989 | 15 | Andy Heck | OT | Notre Dame | |
| 1990 | 3 | Cortez Kennedy^ | DT | Miami (FL) | |
| 1991 | 16 | Dan McGwire | QB | San Diego State | |
| 1992 | 10 | Ray Roberts | OT | Virginia | |
| 1993 | 2 | Rick Mirer | QB | Notre Dame | |
| 1994 | 8 | Sam Adams | DT | Texas A&M | |
| 1995 | 8 | Joey Galloway | WR | Ohio State | |
| 1996 | 21 | Pete Kendall | OT | Boston College | |
| 1997 | 3 | Shawn Springs | CB | Ohio State | |
| 1997 | 6 | Walter Jones^ | OT | Florida State | |
| 1998 | 15 | Anthony Simmons | LB | Clemson | |
| 1999 | 22 | Lamar King | DE | Saginaw Valley State | |
| 2000 | 19 | Shaun Alexander | RB | Alabama | |
| 2000 | 22 | Chris McIntosh | OT | Wisconsin | |
| 2001 | 9 | Koren Robinson | WR | North Carolina State | |
| 2001 | 17 | Steve Hutchinson^ | G | Michigan | |
| 2002 | 28 | Jerramy Stevens | TE | Washington | |
| 2003 | 11 | Marcus Trufant | CB | Washington State | |
| 2004 | 23 | Marcus Tubbs | DT | Texas | |
| 2005 | 26 | Chris Spencer | C | Mississippi | |
| 2006 | 31 | Kelly Jennings | CB | Miami (FL) | |
| 2007 | No pick | | | | |
| 2008 | 28 | Lawrence Jackson | DE | Southern California | |
| 2009 | 4 | Aaron Curry | LB | Wake Forest | |
| 2010 | 6 | Russell Okung | OT | Oklahoma State | |
| 2010 | 14 | Earl Thomas | S | Texas | |
| 2011 | 25 | James Carpenter | OG | Alabama | |
| 2012 | 15 | Bruce Irvin | DE | West Virginia | |
| 2013 | No pick | | | | |
| 2014 | No pick | | | | |
| 2015 | No pick | | | | |
| 2016 | 31 | Germain Ifedi | G/T | Texas A&M | |
| 2017 | No pick | | | | |
| 2018 | 27 | Rashaad Penny | RB | San Diego State | |
| 2019 | 29 | L. J. Collier | DE | TCU | |
| 2020 | 27 | Jordyn Brooks | LB | Texas Tech | |
| 2021 | No pick | | | | |
| 2022 | 9 | Charles Cross | OT | Mississippi State | |
| 2023 | 5 | Devon Witherspoon | CB | Illinois | |
| 2023 | 20 | Jaxon Smith-Njigba | WR | Ohio State | |
| 2024 | 16 | Byron Murphy II | DT | Texas | |
| 2025 | 18 | Grey Zabel | OG | North Dakota State | |
| 2026 | 32 | Jadarian Price | RB | Notre Dame | |
