= Tommy Kane =

Canadian gridiron football player (born 1964)

No. 81, 82
- Position: Wide receiver

Personal information
- Born: January 14, 1964 (age 62); Montreal, Quebec, Canada
- Listed height: 5 ft 11 in (1.80 m)
- Listed weight: 180 lb (82 kg)

Career information
- High school: Dawson College (Montreal)
- College: Syracuse
- NFL draft: 1988: 3rd round, 75th overall pick

Career history
- Seattle Seahawks (1988–1992); Toronto Argonauts (1994)

Awards and highlights
- First-team All-East (1987)

Career NFL statistics
- Receptions: 142
- Receiving yards: 2,034
- Receiving touchdowns: 9
- Stats at Pro Football Reference

Thomas Henry Kane (born January 14, 1964) is a Canadian former professional football player. He played for the Seattle Seahawks of the National Football League (NFL) for four years, and then for the Toronto Argonauts of the Canadian Football League (CFL) for one year.

== Football career ==
Kane played college football at Syracuse University.

NFL

A third-round draft pick in 1988, Kane played for the Seattle Seahawks from 1988 to 1992, when his season ended early due to ankle and knee injuries. The Seahawks cut him during training camp in the following year

CFL

Kane moved to the Canadian Football League. He played five games for the Toronto Argonauts in 1994.

At the end of his pro career, Kane volunteered at youth football camps sponsored by Montreal's Westend Sport Association, which he had attended as a youth. While with the Argonauts, he donated a year's salary to the Centre. Kane is of Black Nova Scotian descent.

== NFL career statistics ==
Legend
**Bold**	Career high

Year	Team	Games		Receiving				
Year	Team	GP	GS	Rec	Yds	Avg	Lng	TD
1988	SEA	9	0	6	32	5.3	9	0
1989	SEA	5	0	7	94	13.4	20	0
1990	SEA	**16**	11	**52**	**776**	14.9	**63**	**4**
1991	SEA	**16**	**15**	50	763	**15.3**	60	2
1992	SEA	11	11	27	369	13.7	31	3
Career		57	37	142	2,034	14.3	63	9

== Crime and legal proceedings ==
In 1988, while at Syracuse University, Kane was arrested for assaulting a police officer after the officer attempted to have his illegally-parked car towed. He was charged with second-degree assault, second-degree obstructing governmental administration and resisting arrest. He was subsequently sentenced to community service.

On November 30, 2003, Kane severely beat and then stabbed his estranged wife, Tammara Shaikh, in his mother's house in LaSalle, Quebec. Shaikh, 35, died in the arms of a church counsellor from Kane's church who had accompanied her to the home with the intention of escorting Kane to a detox center. The couple had recently separated.

Originally charged with second-degree murder, Kane pleaded guilty to manslaughter for the act. Prosecutors took his depression into account, agreeing to the lesser count. There was a dispute as to whether he intended to murder his wife and claimed during his trial that he didn't remember the attack fully. Kane was ultimately sentenced to 18 years in prison.

In 2010, Quebec judge Clement Gascon ordered Kane to pay damages of $590,000 to Tammara Shaikh's family. $125,000 was awarded to each of Kane and Shaikh's four children and $90,000 to Tammara's sister, Ava Shaikh, who had gained legal custody of the children after Tammara's murder. In late 2015, the Canadian Parole Board approved Kane for six months of day parole while he continued to serve his 18 year sentence.

== Popular culture ==
- On November 22, 2014, Investigation Discovery aired this story in season 3, episode 3 of the original series Fatal Vows in an episode entitled Big League Murder.
