= John L. Williams (American football) =

American football player (born 1964)

No. 32, 22
- Position: Fullback

Personal information
- Born: November 23, 1964 (age 61); Palatka, Florida, U.S.
- Listed height: 5 ft 11 in (1.80 m)
- Listed weight: 231 lb (105 kg)

Career information
- High school: Palatka
- College: Florida
- NFL draft: 1986: 1st round, 15th overall pick

Career history
- Seattle Seahawks (1986–1993); Pittsburgh Steelers (1994–1995)

Awards and highlights
- 2× Pro Bowl (1990, 1991); 2× Second-team All-SEC (1984, 1985); Seattle Seahawks Top 50 players; University of Florida Athletic Hall of Fame

Career NFL statistics
- Rushing yards: 5,006
- Rushing average: 4
- Receptions: 546
- Receiving yards: 4,656
- Total touchdowns: 37
- Stats at Pro Football Reference

John L. Williams (born November 23, 1964) is an American former professional football player who was a fullback for 10 seasons in the National Football League (NFL) during the 1980s and 1990s. Williams played college football for the Florida Gators. A first-round pick in the 1986 NFL draft, he played professionally for the Seattle Seahawks and the Pittsburgh Steelers of the NFL.

== Early life ==
Williams was born in Palatka, Florida in 1964. He attended Palatka High School, where he was a standout high school football running back in the wishbone offense of the Palatka Panthers. Williams rushed for 3,449 yards and fifty-nine touchdowns, including 1,738 yards as a senior. The Panthers finished undefeated and won the Florida Class 3A championship. In 2007, twenty-five years after he graduated from high school, the Florida High School Athletic Association (FHSAA) recognized Williams as one of the "100 Greatest Players of the First 100 Years" of Florida high school football.

== College career ==
Williams accepted an athletic scholarship to attend the University of Florida in Gainesville, Florida, where he was a fullback for coach Charley Pell and coach Galen Hall's Florida Gators football teams from 1982 to 1985. Williams usually shared the backfield with tailback Neal Anderson, behind the blocking of the Gators' outstanding offensive line known as "The Great Wall of Florida." The Gators finished with identical 9–1–1 records in 1984 and 1985, and best-in-the-conference records of 5–0–1 and 5–1. Williams was recognized as a second-team All-Southeastern Conference (SEC) selection in 1984 and 1985, and an honorable mention All-American in 1985. He finished his four-year college career with 2,409 yards rushing and 863 yards receiving. Williams was inducted into the University of Florida Athletic Hall of Fame as a "Gator Great" in 1997. In a 2006 article series written for The Gainesville Sun, the Sun sportswriters rated him as the No. 31 all-time Gator from among the 100 greatest players of the first century of Florida football.

== Professional career ==
Williams was selected by the Seattle Seahawks in the first round (fifteenth pick overall) of the 1986 NFL draft. He played for the Seahawks for eight seasons from 1986 to 1993. He was selected to the Pro Bowl in 1990 and 1991. Williams played his final two seasons for the Pittsburgh Steelers in 1994 and 1995, and his last NFL game was Super Bowl XXX in which the Steelers lost to the Dallas Cowboys.

During his ten-year professional career, Williams played in 149 regular season games, started in 135 of them, and had 1,245 carries for 5,005 yards and eighteen rushing touchdowns, and 546 receptions for 4,656 yards and nineteen receiving touchdowns.

== NFL career statistics ==
Year	Team	GP	Att	Yds	Avg	Lng	TD	Rec	Yds	Avg	Lng	TD
1986	SEA	16	129	538	4.2	36	0	33	219	6.6	23	0
1987	SEA	12	113	500	4.4	48	1	38	420	11.1	75	3
1988	SEA	16	189	877	4.6	44	4	58	651	11.2	75	3
1989	SEA	15	146	499	3.4	21	1	76	657	8.6	51	6
1990	SEA	16	187	714	3.8	25	3	73	699	9.6	60	0
1991	SEA	16	188	741	3.9	42	4	61	499	8.1	35	1
1992	SEA	16	114	339	3.0	14	1	74	556	7.5	27	2
1993	SEA	16	82	371	4.5	38	3	58	450	7.8	25	1
1994	PIT	15	68	317	4.7	23	1	51	378	7.4	23	2
1995	PIT	11	29	110	3.8	31	0	24	127	5.3	20	1
Career		149	1,245	5,006	4.0	48	18	546	4,656	8.5	75	19

== See also ==
- Florida Gators football, 1980–89
- List of Florida Gators in the NFL draft
- List of Pittsburgh Steelers players
- List of Seattle Seahawks first-round draft picks
- List of Seattle Seahawks players
- List of University of Florida Athletic Hall of Fame members
