= Marcus Tubbs =

American football player (born 1981)

No. 90
- Position: Defensive tackle

Personal information
- Born: May 16, 1981 (age 45); Dallas, Texas, U.S.
- Listed height: 6 ft 3 in (1.91 m)
- Listed weight: 320 lb (145 kg)

Career information
- High school: DeSoto (DeSoto, Texas)
- College: Texas
- NFL draft: 2004: 1st round, 23rd overall pick

Career history
- Seattle Seahawks (2004–2007)

Awards and highlights
- First-team All-Big 12 (2003); Third-team All-Big 12 (2002); 2002 Cotton Bowl Classic Champion; 2002 Big 12 South Co-Champion; 2001 Holiday Bowl Champion; 2001 Big 12 South Champion

Career NFL statistics
- Total tackles: 60
- Sacks: 7
- Forced fumbles: 3
- Fumble recoveries: 1
- Stats at Pro Football Reference

Marcus Dwayne Tubbs (born May 16, 1981) is an American former professional football player who was a defensive tackle for three seasons with Seattle Seahawks of the National Football League (NFL). He played as a backup right tackle for the Seahawks in Super Bowl XL, after being selected by them 23rd overall in the 2004 NFL draft. He was an All-Big 12 conference player playing college football for the Texas Longhorns, with whom he later served as the director of football operations. In 2016 he became as assistant athletics director for football operations at the University of Houston.

== Early life ==
Tubbs was born in Dallas, Texas on May 16, 1981. Tubbs played basketball at DeSoto High School and did not start playing football until his junior year when he became a tight end. He earned first-team All-District honors in his senior year, when he had 28 catches for 353 yards and two touchdowns. He was a starter for his basketball team for 3 years in a row.

== College career ==
At Texas, Tubbs moved to the defensive line and became two-time All-Big 12 defensive tackle including first-team honors as a senior in 2003 when he was also a team captain. He played in 48 games, starting 37 games of them and finished his college career with 205 tackles and 19.5 sacks. He also forced 2 fumbles and 12 of his tackles caused a loss of yardage.

== Professional career ==
Tubbs was selected by Seattle Seahawks in the first round of the 2004 NFL draft and was then with the team for four injury-plagued years.

During his rookie year in 2004 he played in 11 games, recording six solo tackles, seven assisted tackles, one forced fumble and one sack.

In 2005, he played in 13 games, including Super Bowl XL. He recorded twenty-seven solo tackles, thirteen assisted tackles, 6 sacks and 2 forced fumbles.

In 2006, after playing in 5 games, Tubbs was placed on injured reserve with a knee injury that required microfracture surgery. Before the injury, he recorded four solo tackles, three assisted tackles and a half-sack.

In 2007, he was placed on injured reserve during pre-season and did not play any games.

On August 11, 2008, he was released from the Seahawks after failing his physical. Head coach Mike Holmgren indicated that the team would be interested in re-signing Tubbs when he recovers from his injuries, though this never came to be.

== Football Support Staff ==
In 2009, Tubbs returned to Texas where he spent eight years on the football teams support staff, first as a football operations intern. From 2010 to 2012 he served as special assistant for player relations. In 2012 he was the director of football operations and the next year he became assistant athletics director for football operations. In 2016 he was hired by the University of Houston as their assistant athletics director for football operations. In 2019, he left UH to work in medical sales, first with Vitalus Health and then with NuVasive.

== See also ==
List of Seattle Seahawks first-round draft picks
