= Ron Heller (tight end) =

American football player (born 1963)

No. 89, 80, 85, 82
- Position: Tight end

Personal information
- Born: September 18, 1963 (age 63); Grass Valley, California, U.S.
- Listed height: 6 ft 3 in (1.91 m)
- Listed weight: 236 lb (107 kg)

Career information
- High school: Clark Fork (Clark Fork, Idaho)
- College: Oregon State
- NFL draft: 1986: undrafted

Career history
- Dallas Cowboys (1986)*; San Francisco 49ers (1986–1988); Atlanta Falcons (1989); Seattle Seahawks (1990, 1992)
- * Offseason or practice squad member only

Awards and highlights
- Super Bowl champion (XXIII)

Career NFL statistics
- Receptions: 84
- Receiving yards: 871
- Touchdowns: 5
- Stats at Pro Football Reference

Ronald Jeffrey Heller (born September 18, 1963) is an American former professional football tight end in the National Football League (NFL) for the San Francisco 49ers, Atlanta Falcons, and Seattle Seahawks. He played college football at Oregon State University.

== Early life ==
Born in Grass Valley, California, he moved with his family to Clark Fork in north Idaho when he was 12, and graduated from Clark Fork High School in 1981, in a senior class of 18. He was a three-sport standout in football (All-state), basketball (All-state), and track (won the state title in the 200-meter dash). He played in an 8-man league in football.

Heller accepted a football scholarship to Oregon State University. He played for the Beavers from 1981 to 1985, where he played as a nose guard (freshman) and linebacker (sophomore and junior), before being switched to tight end as a senior.

In 2005, he was inducted into the Idaho Athletic Hall of Fame.

== Professional career ==
=== Dallas Cowboys ===
Heller was not selected in the 1986 NFL draft and was signed as an undrafted free agent by the Dallas Cowboys. He was released before the start of the season.

=== San Francisco 49ers ===
The San Francisco 49ers claimed him based on a recommendation from Paul Hackett, but a preseason neck injury placed him on the injured reserve list during the 1986 season. With the 49ers he was a special teams player and a part-time starter.

=== Atlanta Falcons ===
He signed with the Atlanta Falcons as a Plan B free agent in 1989. He started 13 games and his 33 receptions for 324 yards, ranked him sixth in the National Football Conference.

=== Seattle Seahawks ===
In 1990 after being left unprotected again, he signed as a Plan B free agent with the Seattle Seahawks. He was waived on August 26, 1991. After being out of football for a year, the Seahawks re-signed him on March 10, 1992.

== NFL career statistics ==
=== Regular season ===
Legend
	Won the Super Bowl
**Bold**	Career high

Year	Team	Games		Receiving					
Year	Team	GP	GS	Rec	Yds	Avg	Long	YPG	TD
1987	SF	13	6	12	165	**13.75**	12.7	**39t**	**3**
1988	SF	16	8	14	140	10.00	8.8	22	0
1989	ATL	15	13	**33**	**324**	9.82	**21.6**	30	1
1990	SEA	16	5	13	157	12.08	9.8	23	1
1992	SEA	16	11	12	85	7.08	5.3	17	0
Career		76	43	84	871	10.37	11.5	39t	5

== Personal life ==
Heller left football in 1993 and spent two years at Smith Barney as a financial consultant. In 1995, he co-founded Peritus Asset Management where he was CEO and Senior Portfolio Advisor. He is currently the head of Partner Development at PlanMember in Carpinteria, CA.
