= Derrick Fenner =

American football player (born 1967)

No. 44, 34
- Position: Running back

Personal information
- Born: April 6, 1967 (age 59); Washington, D.C., U.S.
- Listed height: 6 ft 3 in (1.91 m)
- Listed weight: 240 lb (109 kg)

Career information
- High school: Oxon Hill (MD)
- College: North Carolina
- NFL draft: 1989: 10th round, 268th overall pick

Career history
- Seattle Seahawks (1988–1991); Cincinnati Bengals (1992–1994); Oakland Raiders (1995–1997)

Awards and highlights
- NFL rushing touchdowns co-leader (1990); First-team All-ACC (1986)

Career NFL statistics
- Rushing yards: 2,996
- Rushing average: 3.7
- Rushing touchdowns: 32
- Stats at Pro Football Reference

Derrick Steven Fenner (born April 6, 1967), is an American former professional football player who was a running back in the National Football League (NFL). He played college football for the North Carolina Tar Heels and was selected by the Seattle Seahawks in the tenth round of the 1989 NFL draft. Fenner played in 120 NFL games from 1989 to 1997. His best year as a pro came during the 1990 season for the Seahawks when he scored 15 touchdowns (14 rushing and 1 receiving).

In 1987, Fenner spent time in jail after being arrested and charged for a murder. He was later released after his lawyer established that he had not been at the scene of the crime. In 1988, he pleaded guilty to cocaine possession and received probation. As a result of his legal troubles, the University of North Carolina parted ways with him and Fenner went into the NFL draft. After football he made his home with his wife and 2 children in Seattle.

== NFL career statistics ==
Legend
	Led the league
**Bold**	Career high

Year	Team	Games		Rushing					Receiving				
Year	Team	GP	GS	Att	Yds	Avg	Lng	TD	Rec	Yds	Avg	Lng	TD
1989	SEA	5	1	11	41	3.7	9	1	3	23	7.7	9	0
1990	SEA	**16**	**15**	**215**	**859**	4.0	36	**14**	17	143	8.4	**50**	1
1991	SEA	11	7	91	267	2.9	15	4	11	72	6.5	15	0
1992	CIN	**16**	1	112	500	**4.5**	35	7	7	41	5.9	15	1
1993	CIN	15	14	121	482	4.0	26	1	**48**	**427**	**8.9**	40	0
1994	CIN	**16**	13	141	468	3.3	21	1	36	276	7.7	29	1
1995	OAK	**16**	10	39	110	2.8	10	0	35	252	7.2	23	3
1996	OAK	**16**	11	67	245	3.7	17	4	31	252	8.1	23	**4**
1997	OAK	9	7	7	24	3.4	7	0	14	92	6.6	13	0
Career		120	79	804	2,996	3.7	36	32	202	1,578	7.8	50	10
