= Tracy Franz =

American football player (born 1960)

No. 68
- Position: Guard

Personal information
- Born: March 28, 1960 (age 66); Sacramento, California, U.S.
- Listed height: 6 ft 5 in (1.96 m)
- Listed weight: 270 lb (122 kg)

Career information
- High school: Rio Americano
- College: San Jose State
- NFL draft: 1982: undrafted

Career history
- Denver Broncos (1983)*; San Francisco 49ers (1987)
- * Offseason or practice squad member only
- Stats at Pro Football Reference

Tracy Mark Franz (born March 28, 1960) is an American former professional football player who was a guard for the San Francisco 49ers of the National Football League (NFL). He played college football for the San Jose State Spartans.
