= Planmember =

US independent broker-dealers

PlanMember Securities Corporation
- Type: Private
- Industry: Financial services
- Founded: 1982; 44 years ago
- Headquarters: Carpinteria, California, United States, 6267 Carpinteria Ave; Carpinteria, California, United States
- Area served: United States
- Key people: Jon Ziehl, President & CEO
- Revenue: ▲US$ $143.0 million (2021)
- Website: www.planmember.com

PlanMember Securities Corporation (commonly referred to as PlanMember) was founded in 1982 and is considered one of the 25 largest independent broker-dealers. As of 2020, the company had more than 479 financial advisors, over $14 billion in advisory & brokerage assets, and generated approximately $143.0 million in annual revenue for the 2021 fiscal year.

PlanMember was formed in 1982 to provide educators with the level of service and investment choices available to many corporate retirement plan employees. The company has expanded its financial services through more than 50 US-based financial centers and 500 independent financial advisors. PlanMember is headquartered in Carpinteria, CA.

PlanMember's subsidiaries are PlanMember Services, PlanMember Services, PlanMember Financial Corporation, PlanMember Educational Services, and PSC Insurance Marketing Corporation.

== Statistics ==
Key facts regarding PlanMember include the following:

- IBD Elite Top 50 independent broker/dealers
- 500 financial representatives
- Approximately 4,500 technology, custody, and clearing service subscribers
- $16.6 billion in advisory and brokerage assets as of April 2022

== Legal ==
On March 11, 2019, 79 firms agreed to a $125 million industry settlement arising from Firms 12b-1 fees fund sale violations. PlanMember to return $3.5 million to clients.
