= Cortez Kennedy =

American football player (1968–2017)

- Kennedy with the Seattle Seahawks in 1994

No. 96, 99
- Position: Defensive tackle

Personal information
- Born: August 23, 1968; Osceola, Arkansas, U.S.
- Died: May 23, 2017 (aged 48); Orlando, Florida, U.S.
- Listed height: 6 ft 3 in (1.91 m)
- Listed weight: 305 lb (138 kg)

Career information
- High school: Rivercrest (Wilson, Arkansas)
- College: Northwest Mississippi CC (1986–1987); Miami (FL) (1988–1989)
- NFL draft: 1990: 1st round, 3rd overall pick

Career history
- Seattle Seahawks (1990–2000)

Awards and highlights
- NFL Defensive Player of the Year (1992); 3× First-team All-Pro (1992–1994); 2× Second-team All-Pro (1991, 1996); 8× Pro Bowl (1991–1996, 1998, 1999); NFL 1990s All-Decade Team; PFWA All-Rookie Team (1990); Seattle Seahawks 35th Anniversary team; Seattle Seahawks Top 50 players; Seattle Seahawks Ring of Honor; Seattle Seahawks No. 96 retired; 2× National champion (1987, 1989); Second-team All-American (1989)

Career NFL statistics
- Tackles: 668
- Sacks: 58
- Interceptions: 3
- Stats at Pro Football Reference
- Pro Football Hall of Fame

Cortez C. Kennedy (August 23, 1968 – May 23, 2017) was an American professional football player who was a defensive tackle for his entire 11-season career with the Seattle Seahawks of the National Football League (NFL). He was inducted into the Pro Football Hall of Fame in 2012. He redefined and expanded the possibilities of how a large-bodied interior lineman could be used. In 1992, he won the Defensive Player of the Year award despite his team finishing 2–14.

Kennedy played collegiate football for the Miami Hurricanes at the University of Miami.

== Early life and college ==
Kennedy was born in Osceola, Arkansas, but grew up in the nearby town of Wilson. He graduated from Rivercrest High School in Wilson, and attended Northwest Mississippi Community College before being awarded a football scholarship to the University of Miami, where he was named an All-American in 1989.

Kennedy was inducted into the University of Miami Sports Hall of Fame in 2004.

== Professional career ==
Pre-draft measurables
Height	Weight	Arm length	Hand span	40-yard dash	10-yard split	20-yard split	Bench press
6 ft 1 1/2 in (1.87 m)	295 lb (134 kg)	30 7/8 in (0.78 m)	9 1/8 in (0.23 m)	4.95 s	1.75 s	2.86 s	23 reps
All values from NFL Combine

He was the third overall selection in the first round of the 1990 NFL draft by the Seahawks. He was unsigned until two days before the beginning of the season. Kennedy was named to the Pro Bowl in 1991. In 1992, having recorded 14 quarterback sacks, he received the NFL Defensive Player of the Year by the Associated Press despite the Seahawks' 2–14 record. He switched his jersey number to 99 that season in honor of close friend Jerome Brown, and was named First- or Second-team All-Pro five times.

Kennedy retired after the 2000 season. In 167 games with Seattle, he recorded 668 tackles, 58 sacks, and three interceptions. He announced his retirement in August 2002 after sitting out the 2001 season. He was given several offers by other teams, but wanted to finish his career in Seattle. He is generally considered one of the best defensive tackles to ever play the position in the NFL. He was a semi-finalist for the Pro Football Hall of Fame in 2008, as well as a finalist in 2009 and 2011, eventually being elected to the Hall as a member of the 2012 induction class. He was the second Hall of Famer to earn his credentials primarily as a Seahawk.

After retiring, Kennedy worked as an advisor for the New Orleans Saints, whose general manager, Mickey Loomis, had previously worked for the Seahawks. Kennedy later moved to Arkansas and Orlando, Florida, where he raised his daughter Courtney and focused on her education.

In 2006, Kennedy was inducted into the Seahawks' Ring of Honor. His jersey number, 96, was retired by the Seahawks during a game against the New England Patriots on October 14, 2012.

In 2007, Kennedy was named the best athlete ever to wear the number 96 by SI.com.

== NFL career statistics ==
Legend
	NFL Defensive Player of the Year
**Bold**	Career high

Year	Team	Games		Tackles				Interceptions						Fumbles		
Year	Team	GP	GS	Comb	Solo	Ast	Sck	Int	Yds	Avg	Lng	TD	PD	FF	FR	Yds
1990	SEA	16	2	48	48	0	1.0	0	0	0.0	0	0	0	1	**1**	0
1991	SEA	16	16	73	73	0	6.5	0	0	0.0	0	0	0	1	**1**	0
1992	SEA	16	16	**92**	**92**	0	**14.0**	0	0	0.0	0	0	0	**4**	**1**	19
1993	SEA	16	16	77	77	0	6.5	0	0	0.0	0	0	0	1	**1**	0
1994	SEA	16	16	70	54	16	4.0	0	0	0.0	0	0	0	0	**1**	0
1995	SEA	16	16	53	40	13	6.5	0	0	0.0	0	0	0	1	0	0
1996	SEA	16	16	67	48	**19**	8.0	0	0	0.0	0	0	0	1	0	0
1997	SEA	8	8	18	10	8	2.0	0	0	0.0	0	0	0	0	0	0
1998	SEA	15	15	42	29	13	2.0	0	0	0.0	0	0	0	0	**1**	**39**
1999	SEA	16	16	74	61	13	6.5	**2**	12	2.0	7	0	0	2	0	0
2000	SEA	16	16	50	32	18	1.0	1	**14**	**14.0**	**14**	0	0	0	0	0
Career		167	153	668	568	100	58.0	3	26	8.7	14	0	0	11	6	58

== Personal life ==
After retirement, he worked as a consultant for the New Orleans Saints and as an ambassador for the Seahawks. He has a daughter named Courtney.

== Death ==
Kennedy died on May 23, 2017, in Orlando, Florida. He was 48 years old. According to police, Kennedy was alone when he died. In the days leading up to his death, Kennedy had experienced symptoms of heart failure, including swollen legs and dizziness, which led to his hospitalization. Following his death, Wilson, Arkansas named a stretch of U.S. Highway 61 in his honor.
