= John Butler (defensive back) =

American football player (born 1965)

John Bulter
No. 29
- Position: Defensive back

Personal information
- Born: April 13, 1965 (age 61); San Diego, California, U.S.
- Listed height: 6 ft 1 in (1.85 m)
- Listed weight: 200 lb (91 kg)

Career information
- High school: Palos Verdes Peninsula (Rolling Hills Estates, California)
- College: Principia

Career history
- San Francisco 49ers (1987)
- Stats at Pro Football Reference

John Damon Butler (born April 13, 1965) is an American former professional football player who was a defensive back (Note: Some sources list him as a defensive back while some list him as a safety) for the San Francisco 49ers of the National Football League (NFL). He played college football for the Principia Panthers.

== College career ==
Butler played college football at Principia College where he would make the All-Conference as a safety in the Illini–Badger Football Conference in 1985 and 1986.

== Professional career ==
Butler's performances gained the attention of multiple professional football teams, he would sign with the San Francisco 49ers as a free agent becoming the first player from Principia to play in the NFL. Butler would play 1 season for the 49ers, playing 3 games in the 1987 NFL season recording 2 tackles.
