= Vann McElroy =

American football player (born 1960)

No. 26, 31
- Position: Safety

Personal information
- Born: January 13, 1960 (age 66); Birmingham, Alabama, U.S.
- Listed height: 6 ft 2 in (1.88 m)
- Listed weight: 193 lb (88 kg)

Career information
- High school: Uvalde (TX)
- College: Baylor
- NFL draft: 1982: 3rd round, 64th overall pick

Career history
- Los Angeles Raiders (1982–1990); Seattle Seahawks (1990–1992)

Awards and highlights
- Super Bowl champion (XVIII); 4× Second-team All-Pro (1983, 1984, 1986, 1987); 2× Pro Bowl (1983, 1984); Second-team All-American (1981); Third-team All-American (1980); First-team All-SWC (1980)

Career NFL statistics
- Interceptions: 31
- Interception yards: 296
- Touchdowns: 1
- Stats at Pro Football Reference

Vann William McElroy (born January 13, 1960) is an American former professional football player who was a defensive back for nine seasons in the National Football League (NFL), primarilty with the Los Angeles Raiders. A 6 ft 2 in (1.88 m), 193-pound (88 kg) safety, he played college football for the Baylor Bears, he was selected by the Raiders in the third round of the 1982 NFL draft.

McElroy played in consecutive Pro Bowls following the 1983 and 1984 seasons, and was a member of the Raiders' 1983 team that won Super Bowl XVIII in a rout of the favored Washington Redskins.

During the 1990 season, the Raiders traded McElroy to the Seahawks on October 16 in exchange for the Seahawks' eighth-round pick in the 1991 NFL draft.

McElroy is currently an agent representing professional players in contract negotiations and resides in Uvalde, Texas.
