= Clyde Glover =

American football player (born 1960)

No. 58, 93
- Position: Defensive lineman

Personal information
- Born: July 16, 1960 (age 66); New Orleans, Louisiana, U.S.
- Listed height: 6 ft 6 in (1.98 m)
- Listed weight: 280 lb (127 kg)

Career information
- High school: Sunset (North Las Vegas, Nevada)
- College: Fresno State
- NFL draft: 1984: undrafted

Career history
- New England Patriots (1984)*; Kansas City Chiefs (1985)*; Toronto Argonauts (1985); San Francisco 49ers (1986–1988); Los Angeles Raiders (1989)*; Buffalo Bills (1990)*
- * Offseason or practice squad member only
- Stats at Pro Football Reference

Clyde M. Glover (born July 16, 1960) is an American former professional football defensive lineman who played for the San Francisco 49ers of the National Football League (NFL). He played college football for the Fresno State Bulldogs.

== Early life ==
Clyde M. Glover was born on July 16, 1960, in New Orleans, Louisiana. He attended Sunset High School in North Las Vegas, Nevada.

== College career ==
Glover played junior college football at Walla Walla Community College from 1980 to 1981. He transferred to Fresno State University, where he was a two-year letterman for the Bulldogs from 1982 to 1983.

== Professional career ==
After going undrafted in the 1984 NFL draft, Glover signed with the New England Patriots on May 14. He was released on August 21, 1984, after the third preseason game.

On October 15, 1984, Glover signed a reserve/future contract with the Kansas City Chiefs for the 1985 season. He was released on June 7, 1985.

Glover was signed by the Toronto Argonauts of the Canadian Football League on June 10, 1985. He played in the first five games of the 1985 CFL season, and posted two sacks, before being released on August 4, 1985.

Glover signed with the San Francisco 49ers on March 10, 1986. He was released on August 19 after the second game of the 1986 preseason. On October 29, 1986, he signed a futures contract with the 49ers for the 1987 season. Glover was released on September 7, 1987, before the start of the regular season. On September 24, he was re-signed by the 49ers during the 1987 NFL players strike. He played good enough to stay on with the team after the strike ended. Glover played in 13 games overall, starting one, for San Francisco in 1987 and made two sacks. He also appeared in one playoff game. He was placed on injured reserve on August 29, 1988, and was released on October 4, 1988.

Glover was signed by the Los Angeles Raiders on January 10, 1989. He was released on August 29, 1989, after the third preseason game.

Glover signed with the Buffalo Bills on May 14, 1990. He was released on August 27 after the third game of the 1990 preseason.
