= Mike Wells (tight end) =

American football player (born 1962)

No. 40
- Position: Tight end

Personal information
- Born: January 22, 1962 (age 64); Quincy, California, U.S.
- Listed height: 6 ft 3 in (1.91 m)
- Listed weight: 233 lb (106 kg)

Career information
- High school: Quincy
- College: San Diego State
- NFL draft: 1984: undrafted

Career history
- San Francisco 49ers (1984)*; San Francisco 49ers (1987)
- * Offseason or practice squad member only
- Stats at Pro Football Reference

Michael L. Wells (born January 22, 1962) is an American former professional football player who played tight end for the San Francisco 49ers of the National Football League (NFL). He played college football for the San Diego State Aztecs.
