= Chick Harris =

American football coach (1945–2025)

Personal information
- Born: October 3, 1948; Durham, North Carolina, U.S.
- Died: January 7, 2025 (aged 76); Atlanta, Georgia, U.S.

Career information
- Positions: Defensive back, running back, wide receiver
- High school: Polytechnic (Long Beach, California)
- College: Long Beach CC (1965–1966); Northern Arizona (1967–1968)

Career history
- Colorado State (1970–1972) (WR); Long Beach State (1973) (WR); Detroit Wheels (1974) (OB/R); Washington (1975–1980) (DB); Buffalo Bills (1981–1982) (RB); Seattle Seahawks (1983–1991) (OB); Los Angeles Rams (1992–1993) (RB); Los Angeles Rams (1994) (OC); Carolina Panthers (1995–2001) (RB); Houston Texans (2002–2013) (RB)

Cleveland C. "Chick" Harris (September 21, 1945 – January 7, 2025) was an American football coach. He was a running backs coach in the National Football League (NFL) from 1981 to 2013. He was also the offensive coordinator of the Los Angeles Rams in 1994. Harris was the first running backs coach for both the Carolina Panthers and Houston Texans.

== Early life ==
Cleveland C. Harris was born on September 21, 1945, in Durham, North Carolina. He attended Long Beach Polytechnic High School in Long Beach, California.

Harris participated in both football and track at Long Beach City College. He played wide receiver for Long Beach from 1965 to 1966. He was inducted into the LBCC Foundation Hall Of Champions in 2008. Harris played defensive back and running back for the Northern Arizona Lumberjacks from 1967 to 1968. He was also a sprinter on Northern Arizona's track team. He was inducted into the NAU Athletics Hall of Fame in 1985.

== Coaching career ==
Harris began his coaching career at the collegiate level. He was the wide receivers coach at Colorado State from 1970 to 1972, the wide receivers coach at Long Beach State in 1973, and the defensive backs coach at Washington from 1975 to 1980.

Harris' first job at the professional level was as the offensive backs/receivers coach for the Detroit Wheels of the World Football League in 1974. He was later a running backs coach in the National Football League from 1981 to 2013 with the Buffalo Bills (1981–1982), Seattle Seahawks (1983–1991, offensive backfield), Los Angeles Rams (1992–1993), Carolina Panthers (1995–2001), and Houston Texans (2002–2013). He was also the offensive coordinator of the Rams in 1994. In 1995, Harris was hired to be the first running back coach in Panthers' history. Having been with the Texans since the team's inception in 2002, Harris became the longest tenured coach in franchise history when Joe Marciano was fired on December 6, 2013. However, Harris himself was fired by new head coach Bill O'Brien less than a month later.

== Personal life ==
Harris died on January 7, 2025, at age 79 in Atlanta, Georgia.
