= Warren Wheat =

American football player (born 1967)

No. 74
- Position: Guard

Personal information
- Born: May 13, 1967 (age 59); Phoenix, Arizona, U.S.
- Listed height: 6 ft 6 in (1.98 m)
- Listed weight: 274 lb (124 kg)

Career information
- High school: Camelback (Phoenix)
- College: BYU
- NFL draft: 1989: 8th round, 215th overall pick

Career history
- Los Angeles Rams (1989)*; Seattle Seahawks (1989–1991)
- * Offseason or practice squad member only

Career NFL statistics
- Games played: 16
- Games started: 7
- Stats at Pro Football Reference

Warren Wheat (born May 13, 1967) is an American former professional football player who was a guard for the Seattle Seahawks of the National Football League (NFL) from 1989 to 1991. Wheat played college football for the BYU Cougars] and was selected by the Los Angeles Rams in the eighth round of the 1989 NFL draft with the 215th overall pick.
