= Travis McNeal =

American football player (born 1967)

No. 86, 82
- Position: Tight end

Personal information
- Born: January 10, 1967 (age 59); Birmingham, Alabama, U.S.
- Listed height: 6 ft 3 in (1.91 m)
- Listed weight: 248 lb (112 kg)

Career information
- High school: West End (Birmingham, Alabama)
- College: Chattanooga
- NFL draft: 1989: 4th round, 101st overall pick

Career history
- Seattle Seahawks (1989–1992); Los Angeles Rams (1992–1993)

Awards and highlights
- PFWA All-Rookie Team (1989)

Career NFL statistics
- Receptions: 48
- Receiving yards: 652
- Touchdowns: 2
- Stats at Pro Football Reference

Travis S. McNeal (born January 10, 1967) is an American former professional football player who was a tight end for five seasons with the Seattle Seahawks and Los Angeles Rams. He was selected by the Seahawks in the fourth round of the 1989 NFL draft with the 101st overall pick.
