= Terry Wooden =

American football player (born 1967)

No. 90, 57
- Position: Linebacker

Personal information
- Born: January 14, 1967 (age 59); Hartford, Connecticut, U.S.
- Listed height: 6 ft 3 in (1.91 m)
- Listed weight: 239 lb (108 kg)

Career information
- High school: Farmington (Farmington, Connecticut)
- College: Syracuse
- NFL draft: 1990: 2nd round, 29th overall pick

Career history
- Seattle Seahawks (1990–1996); Kansas City Chiefs (1997); Oakland Raiders (1998)

Awards and highlights
- NFL solo tackles leader (1995); Third-team All-American (1989); 2× First-team All-East (1988, 1989)

Career NFL statistics
- Tackles: 700
- Sacks: 10
- Interceptions: 7
- Stats at Pro Football Reference

Terrence T. Wooden (born January 14, 1967) is an American former professional football player who was a linebacker in the National Football League (NFL) for three teams, the Seattle Seahawks, Kansas City Chiefs, and Oakland Raiders, from 1990 to 1998. He was selected 29th overall by the Seahawks in the second round of the 1990 NFL draft.

Wooden played college football for the Syracuse Orange and is currently a scout for the New Orleans Saints. Attended Farmington High School in Connecticut.
