= Eric Hayes (American football) =

American football player (born 1967)

No. 78, 93, 95
- Position: Defensive tackle

Personal information
- Born: November 12, 1967 (age 58); Tampa, Florida, U.S.
- Listed height: 6 ft 3 in (1.91 m)
- Listed weight: 292 lb (132 kg)

Career information
- High school: C. Leon King (Tampa)
- College: Florida State
- NFL draft: 1990: 5th round, 119th overall pick

Career history
- Seattle Seahawks (1990–1991); Los Angeles Rams (1992); Tampa Bay Buccaneers (1993); Connecticut Coyotes (1995)

Career NFL statistics
- Fumble recoveries: 1
- Stats at Pro Football Reference
- Stats at ArenaFan.com

Eric Gerard Hayes (born November 12, 1967) is an American former professional football player who was a defensive tackle for four seasons in the National Football League (NFL) with the Seattle Seahawks, Los Angeles Rams, and Tampa Bay Buccaneers. He was selected by the Seahawks in the fifth round of the 1990 NFL draft after playing college football for the Florida State Seminoles. Hayes was also a member of the Connecticut Coyotes of the Arena Football League (AFL).

== Early life ==
Eric Gerard Hayes was born on November 12, 1967, in Tampa, Florida. He attended C. Leon King High School in Tampa.

== College career ==
Hayes was a four-year letterman for the Florida State Seminoles from 1986 to 1989. He was redshirted in 1985. He earned Associated Press Honorable Mention All-American honors in 1987. Hayes also garnered second-team all-South Independent, Football News Third-team All-American and The Sporting News Honorable Mention All-American accolades in 1989.

== Professional career ==
Hayes was selected by the Seattle Seahawks of the NFL in the fifth round, with the 119th pick, of the 1990 NFL draft. He played in all 16 games his rookie year in 1990. He played in five games, starting three, during the 1991 season before being placed on injured reserve on October 2, 1991. Hayes was released on August 31, 1992.

He signed with the Los Angeles Rams on September 21, 1992, and played in one game during the 1992 season before being released on October 2, 1992. Hayes was signed by the Tampa Bay Buccaneers on March 12, 1993. He played in two games during the 1993 season before being released on September 16, 1993. He played for the AFL's Connecticut Coyotes in 1995.
