= Patrick Hunter =

American football player (born 1964)

No. 23, 27, 24
- Position: Cornerback

Personal information
- Born: October 24, 1964 (age 62); San Francisco, California, U.S.
- Listed height: 5 ft 11 in (1.80 m)
- Listed weight: 186 lb (84 kg)

Career information
- High school: South San Francisco (South San Francisco, California)
- College: Nevada
- NFL draft: 1986: 3rd round, 68th overall pick

Career history
- Seattle Seahawks (1986–1994); Arizona Cardinals (1995)

Career NFL statistics
- Tackles: 414
- Interceptions: 14
- Fumble recoveries: 5
- Stats at Pro Football Reference

Patrick Edward Hunter (born October 24, 1964) is an American former professional football player who was a cornerback for 10 seasons with the Seattle Seahawks and the Arizona Cardinals from 1986 to 1995.

Hunter grew up playing football for South San Francisco High School, then was recruited by Chris Ault as a four-year member of the University of Nevada, Reno Wolf Pack (1982–1985). He was awarded his letter all four years, and appeared in the NCAA Division 1AA national semi-finals after the 1983 and 1985 seasons.

Hunter was selected 68th overall by the Seahawks in the third round of the 1986 NFL draft. Over the course of his 10-year NFL career he played in 125 games (starting 104), logging 14 interceptions (returning one for a touchdown in 1991), 409 solo tackles, and 5 recovered fumbles.
