= Darren Comeaux =

American football player (born 1960)

No. 59, 56, 53
- Position: Linebacker

Personal information
- Born: April 15, 1960 (age 66); San Diego, California, U.S.
- Listed height: 6 ft 1 in (1.85 m)
- Listed weight: 227 lb (103 kg)

Career information
- High school: San Diego
- College: Arizona State
- NFL draft: 1982: undrafted

Career history
- Denver Broncos (1982–1986); San Francisco 49ers (1987); Seattle Seahawks (1988–1991)

Career NFL statistics
- Sacks: 3.5
- Interceptions: 3
- Fumble recoveries: 3
- Stats at Pro Football Reference

Darren Comeaux (born April 15, 1960) is an American former professional football player who was a linebacker for the Denver Broncos (1982–86), San Francisco 49ers (1987) and Seattle Seahawks (1988–91) of the National Football League (NFL). He played college football for the Arizona State Sun Devils.

He helped the Broncos win the 1984 AFC West Division and the 1986 AFC Championship, the 49ers win the 1987 NFC West Division and the Seahawks the 1988 AFC West Division.

Darren Comeaux grew up in California playing basketball and running track didn't start playing football until he was in high school. Once out of high school Darren attended San Diego Mesa Community College and eventually went to Arizona State University. Darren was undersized while in college weighing only 195 pounds, this being the main reason scouts weren't looking at him. He bulked up to 240 pounds and ended up on the Denver Broncos in 1982. While on the Broncos, he helped his team get to Super Bowl XXI but they would lose to the Giants 39–20. When he was on the San Francisco 49ers he suffered a knee injury which left him on injury reserve. While on injury reserve he was taken by the Seattle Seahawks in 1988 and replaced Brian Bosworth when he had a shoulder injury. Darren led the Seahawks in tackles consecutively and retired after spending 10 years in the league. He finished his NFL career in 1991, in 10 seasons he had over 100 tackles, 3½ sacks, 3 interceptions and he even returned 1 kickoff.
