= List of Seattle Seahawks team records =

Statistics of the Seattle Seahawks NFL football team

This article details statistics relating to the Seattle Seahawks NFL football team, including career, single season and game records.

== Offense ==
=== Passing ===
- Most pass attempts, career: Russell Wilson, 4,735
- Most pass attempts, season: Geno Smith, 578 (2024)
- Most pass attempts, rookie season: Rick Mirer, 486 (1993)
- Most pass attempts, game: Geno Smith, 56 (2024)
- Most pass attempts, playoffs: Russell Wilson, 451
- Most pass completions, career: Russell Wilson, 3,079
- Most pass completions, season: Geno Smith, 407 (2024)
- Most pass completions, rookie season: Rick Mirer, 274 (1993)
- Most pass completions, game: Matt Hasselbeck, 39 (2009)
- Most pass completions, playoffs: Russell Wilson, 275
- Most consecutive pass completions, game: Sam Darnold, 17 (2025) and Warren Moon, 17 (1998)
- Highest completion percentage, career (min. 500 attempts): Geno Smith, 68.5
- Highest completion percentage, season (min. 200 attempts): Geno Smith, 70.4 (2024)
- Highest completion percentage, rookie season (min. 200 attempts): Russell Wilson, 64.1 (2012)
- Highest completion percentage, game (min. 15 attempts): Russell Wilson, 88.6 (2020)
- Highest completion percentage, playoffs (min. 100 attempts): Russell Wilson, 61.0
- Most passing yards, career: Russell Wilson, 37,059
- Most passing yards, season: Geno Smith, 4,320 (2024)
- Most passing yards, rookie season: Russell Wilson, 3,118 (2012)
- Most passing yards, game: Russell Wilson, 452 (2017)
- Most passing yards, playoffs: Russell Wilson, 3,786
- Highest yards per attempt, career (min. 500 attempts): Russell Wilson, 7.8
- Highest yards per attempt, season (min. 200 attempts): Dave Krieg, 8.8 (1983)
- Highest yards per attempt, rookie season (min. 200 attempts): Russell Wilson, 7.9 (2012)
- Highest yards per attempt, game (min. 15 attempts): Russell Wilson, 14.6 (2018)
- Highest yards per attempt, playoffs (min. 100 attempts): Russell Wilson, 8.4
- Most passing touchdowns, career: Russell Wilson, 267
- Most passing touchdowns, season: Russell Wilson, 40 (2020)
- Most passing touchdowns, rookie season: Russell Wilson, 26 (2012) (tied NFL record)
- Most passing touchdowns, game: 5 (four players), most recently Russell Wilson (2020)
- Most passing touchdowns, playoffs: Russell Wilson, 25
- Most passes intercepted, career: Dave Krieg, 148
- Most passes intercepted, season: Jim Zorn, 27 (1976)
- Most passes intercepted, rookie season: Jim Zorn, 27 (1976)
- Most passes intercepted, game: Jim Zorn, 6 (1976)
- Most passes intercepted, playoffs: Russell Wilson, 12
- Lowest percentage passes had intercepted, career (min. 500 attempts): Russell Wilson, 1.8
- Lowest percentage passes had intercepted, season (min. 200 attempts): Seneca Wallace, 1.2 (2008)
- Lowest percentage passes had intercepted, rookie season (min. 200 attempts): Russell Wilson, 2.5 (2012)
- Lowest percentage passes had intercepted, playoffs (min. 100 attempts): Matt Hasselbeck, 2.2
- Highest passer rating, career (min. 500 attempts): Russell Wilson, 101.8
- Highest passer rating, season (min. 200 attempts): Russell Wilson, 110.9 (2018)
- Highest passer rating, rookie season (min. 200 attempts): Russell Wilson, 100.0 (2012)
- Highest passer rating, game (min. 10 attempts): Russell Wilson, 158.3 (2018)
- Highest passer rating, playoffs (min. 100 attempts): Russell Wilson, 95.3
- Most games, 300+ passing yards, career: Russell Wilson, 21
- Most games, 400+ passing yards, career: Dave Krieg, 4
- Most games, 300+ passing yards, season: Russell Wilson, 5 (2020) and Geno Smith, 5 (2024)
- Most games, 400+ passing yards, season: Matt Hasselbeck, 2 (2002)
- Most games, 1+ passing TDs, career: Russell Wilson, 137
- Most games, 2+ passing TDs, career: Russell Wilson, 92
- Most games, 3+ passing TDs, career: Russell Wilson, 41
- Most games, 4+ passing TDs, career: Russell Wilson, 17
- Most games, 5+ passing TDs, career: Russell Wilson, 5
- Most games, 1+ passing TDs, season: Dave Krieg, 16 (1984); Russell Wilson, 16 (2015) (tied NFL record)
- Most games, 2+ passing TDs, season: Russell Wilson, 13 (2018)
- Most games, 3+ passing TDs, season: Russell Wilson, 7 (2018 and 2020)
- Most games, 4+ passing TDs, season: Russell Wilson, 5 (2020)
- Most games, 5+ passing TDs, season: Russell Wilson, 2 (2015 and 2020)
- Most game-winning drives, career: Russell Wilson, 32
- Most game-winning drives, season: Dave Krieg, 5 (1990), Russell Wilson, 5 (2019) and Geno Smith, 5 (2023)
- Most fourth quarter comebacks, career: Russell Wilson, 24
- Most fourth quarter comebacks, season: Dave Krieg, 4 (1990), Russell Wilson, 4 (2016, 2019) and Geno Smith, 4 (2023, 2024)
- Highest %, passing TDs, season: Russell Wilson, 8.4 (35 TDs / 427 attempts) (2018)
- Highest %, passing TDs, rookie season: Russell Wilson, 6.62 (26 TDs / 393 attempts) (2012)

=== Receiving ===
- Most receiving touchdowns, career: Steve Largent, 100
- Most receiving touchdowns, season: Doug Baldwin, 14 (2015)
- Most receiving touchdowns, rookie season: Daryl Turner, 10 (1984)
- Most receiving touchdowns, game: Daryl Turner, 4 (1985)
- Most receiving touchdowns, playoffs: Doug Baldwin, 6 and Jermaine Kearse, 6
- Most pass receptions, career: Steve Largent, 819
- Most pass receptions, season: Jaxon Smith-Njigba, 119 (2025)
- Most pass receptions, rookie season: Joey Galloway, 67 (1995)
- Most pass receptions, game: Steve Largent, 15 (1987) and Tyler Lockett, 15 (2020)
- Most pass receptions, playoffs: Doug Baldwin, 58
- Most receiving yards, career: Steve Largent, 13,089
- Most receiving yards, season: Jaxon Smith-Njigba, 1,793 (2025)
- Most receiving yards, rookie season: Joey Galloway, 1,039 (1995)
- Most receiving touchdowns in rookie debut: Darrell Jackson 2
- Most receiving yards, playoffs: Doug Baldwin, 734
- Most receiving yards, game: Steve Largent, 261 (1987)
- Most games, 100+ receiving yards, career: Steve Largent, 40
- Most games, 100+ receiving yards, season: Jaxon Smith-Njigba, 9 (2025)
- Most games, 150+ receiving yards, career: Steve Largent, 4 and Tyler Lockett, 4
- Most games, 150+ receiving yards, season: Jaxon Smith Njigba, 2 (2025)
- Highest yard average per reception, career (min. 200 attempts): Steve Largent, 16.0
- Highest yard average per reception, season (min. 50 attempts): Steve Largent, 18.7 (1979)
- Highest yard average per reception, rookie season (min. 50 attempts): Joey Galloway, 15.5 (1995) and DK Metcalf, 15.5 (2019)
- Highest yard average per reception, game (min. 3 attempts): Koren Robinson, 55.3 (2002)
- Highest catch percentage, career (min. 300 attempts): Jaxon Smith-Njigba, 71.8
- Highest catch percentage, season (min. 50 attempts): Tyler Lockett, 81.4 (2018)
- Highest catch percentage, rookie season (min. 50 attempts): Tyler Lockett, 73.9 (2015)
- Highest yards per game, career (min. 300 attempts): Jaxon Smith-Njigba, 69.6
- Highest yards per game, season (min. 50 attempts): Jaxon Smith-Njigba, 105.5 (2025)
- Highest yards per game, rookie season (min. 50 attempts): Joey Galloway, 64.9 (1995)
- Most receiving touchdowns (tight end), career: Jimmy Graham, 18
- Most receiving touchdowns (tight end), season: Jimmy Graham, 10 (2017)
- Most receiving touchdowns (tight end), playoffs: Jerramy Stevens, 4
- Most pass receptions (tight end), career: Jimmy Graham, 170
- Most pass receptions (tight end), season: Jimmy Graham, 65 (2016)
- Most pass receptions (tight end), playoffs: Jerramy Stevens, 19
- Most receiving yards (tight end), career: Jimmy Graham, 2,048
- Most receiving yards (tight end), season: Jimmy Graham, 923 (2016)
- Most receiving yards (tight end), playoffs: Zach Miller, 236

=== Rushing ===
- Most rushing touchdowns, career: Shaun Alexander, 100
- Most rushing touchdowns, season: Shaun Alexander, 27 (2005) (tied NFL record)
- Most rushing touchdowns, rookie season: Curt Warner, 13 (1983)
- Most rushing touchdowns, game: 4 (three players), most recently Marshawn Lynch (2014)
- Most rushing touchdowns, playoffs: Marshawn Lynch, 12
- Most rushing attempts, career: Shaun Alexander, 2,176
- Most rushing attempts, season: Shaun Alexander, 370 (2005)
- Most rushing attempts, rookie season: Curt Warner, 335 (1983)
- Most rushing attempts, game: Shaun Alexander, 40 (2006)
- Most rushing attempts, playoffs: Marshawn Lynch, 211
- Most rushing yards, career: Shaun Alexander, 9,429
- Most rushing yards, season: Shaun Alexander, 1,880 (2005)
- Most rushing yards, rookie season: Curt Warner, 1,449 (1983)
- Most rushing yards, game: Shaun Alexander, 266 (2001)
- Most rushing yards, playoffs: Marshawn Lynch, 970
- Most games, 100+ rushing yards, career: Shaun Alexander, 37
- Most games, 100+ rushing yards, season: Shaun Alexander, 11 (2005)
- Highest yard rushing average, career (min. 400 attempts): Russell Wilson, 5.6
- Highest yard rushing average, season (min. 100 attempts): Russell Wilson, 7.2 (2014)
- Highest yard rushing average, rookie season (min. 100 attempts): Thomas Rawls, 5.7 (2015)
- Highest yard rushing average, game (min. 10 attempts): Marshawn Lynch, 11.6 (2012)
- Most rushing touchdowns (quarterback), career: Russell Wilson, 23
- Most rushing touchdowns (quarterback), season: Jim Zorn, 6 (1978); Russell Wilson, 6 (2014)
- Most rushing touchdowns (quarterback), rookie season: Jim Zorn, 4 (1976) and Russell Wilson, 4 (2012)
- Most rushing touchdowns (quarterback), game: Russell Wilson, 3 (2012)
- Most rushing touchdowns (quarterback), playoffs: Russell Wilson, 3
- Most rushing yards (quarterback), career: Russell Wilson, 4,689
- Most rushing yards (quarterback), season: Russell Wilson, 849 (2014)
- Most rushing yards (quarterback), rookie season: Russell Wilson, 489 (2012)
- Most rushing yards (quarterback), game: Russell Wilson, 122 (2014)
- Most rushing yards (quarterback), playoffs: Russell Wilson, 527

=== Combined (rushing and receiving) ===
- Most yards from scrimmage, career: Steve Largent, 13,172
- Most yards from scrimmage, season: Shaun Alexander, 1,958 (2005)
- Most yards from scrimmage, rookie season: Curt Warner, 1,774 (1983)
- Most yards from scrimmage, game: Shaun Alexander, 273 (2001)
- Most combined attempts, season: Shaun Alexander, 385 (2005)
- Most combined attempts, rookie season: Curt Warner, 379 (1983)
- Most total touchdowns, career: Shaun Alexander, 112
- Most total touchdowns, season: Shaun Alexander, 28 (2005)
- Most total touchdowns, rookie season: Curt Warner, 14 (1983)
- Most total touchdowns, game: Shaun Alexander, 5 (2002)

== Defense ==
- Most tackles, career: Bobby Wagner, 1,566
- Most tackles, season: Jordyn Brooks, 184 (2021)
- Most tackles, rookie season: Bobby Wagner, 140 (2012)
- Most tackles, playoffs: Bobby Wagner, 153
- Most solo tackles, career: Bobby Wagner, 915
- Most solo tackles, season: Jordyn Brooks, 109 (2021)
- Most solo tackles, rookie season: Bobby Wagner, 87 (2012)
- Most solo tackles, game: David Hawthorne, 15 (2009); Jordyn Brooks, 15 (2021)
- Most solo tackles, playoffs: Bobby Wagner, 92
- Most assisted tackles, career: Bobby Wagner, 651
- Most assisted tackles, season: Bobby Wagner, 87 (2023)
- Most assisted tackles, rookie season: Bobby Wagner, 53 (2012)
- Most assisted tackles, playoffs: Bobby Wagner, 61
- Most sacks, career: Jacob Green, 97.5 Unofficially: Jacob Green, 115.5 (including before sacks were an official stat)
- Most sacks, season: Michael Sinclair, 16.5 (1998)
- Most sacks, rookie season: Bruce Irvin, 8.0 (2012) Unofficially: Steve Niehaus, 9.5 (1976) (before sacks were an official stat)
- Most sacks, game: 4.0 (four players), most recently Chris Clemons (2012)
- Most sacks, playoffs: Cliff Avril, 6.5
- Most sacks (defensive back), season: Jamal Adams, 9.5 (2020) (NFL record)
- Most sacks (defensive back), rookie season: Devon Witherspoon, 3.0 (2023)
- Most sacks (defensive tackle), season: Cortez Kennedy, 14.0 (1992)
- Most sacks (defensive tackle), rookie season: Manu Tuiasosopo, 8.0 (1979)
- Most tackles for loss, career: Bobby Wagner, 79
- Most tackles for loss, season: Michael Bennett, 18 (2015)
- Most tackles for loss, rookie season: Leroy Hill, 11 (2005)
- Most tackles for loss, playoffs: Cliff Avril, 8
- Most quarterback hits, career: Michael Bennett, 118
- Most quarterback hits, season: Michael Bennett, 30 (2015)
- Most quarterback hits, rookie season: Bruce Irvin, 19 (2012)
- Most quarterback hits, playoffs: Cliff Avril, 15
- Most interceptions, career: Dave Brown, 50
- Most interceptions, season: Kenny Easley, 10 (1984); John Harris, 10 (1981)
- Most interceptions, rookie season: Tariq Woolen, 6 (2022)
- Most interceptions, game: 3 (five players), most recently Marcus Trufant (2007)
- Most interceptions, playoffs: John Harris, 4
- Most interceptions returned for touchdown, career: Dave Brown, 5
- Most interceptions returned for touchdown, season: 2 (ten players), most recently Justin Coleman (2017)
- Most interceptions returned for touchdown, rookie season: Brandon Browner, 2 (2011)
- Most interceptions returned for touchdown, game: Dave Brown, 2 (1984)
- Most interceptions returned for touchdown, playoffs: 1 (four players), most recently Kam Chancellor
- Most interception yards returned, career: Dave Brown, 643
- Most interception yards returned, season: Brandon Browner, 220 (2011)
- Most interception yards returned, rookie season: Brandon Browner, 220 (2011)
- Most interception yards returned, playoffs: Kam Chancellor, 92
- Most fumbles, career: Dave Krieg, 108
- Most fumbles, season: Dave Krieg, 18 (1989)
- Most fumbles, rookie season: Rick Mirer, 13 (1993)
- Most forced fumbles, career: Michael Sinclair, 25
- Most forced fumbles, season: Dwayne Harper, 10 (1993)
- Most forced fumbles, rookie season: Coby Bryant, 4 (2022)
- Most forced fumbles, playoffs: Michael Bennett, 3
- Most fumbles recovered (own and opponent), career: Russell Wilson, 32
- Most own fumbles recovered, career: Russell Wilson, 32
- Most own fumbles recovered, season: Dave Krieg, 9 (1989) and Jon Kitna, 9 (2000)
- Most own fumbles recovered, rookie season: Rick Mirer, 5 (1993)
- Most opponents fumbles recovered, career: Jacob Green, 17
- Most opponents fumbles recovered, season: Nesby Glasgow, 5 (1989)
- Most opponents fumbles recovered, rookie season: Kenny Easley, 4 (1981) and Gregg Johnson, 4 (1981)
- Most opponents fumbles recovered, playoffs: Michael Bennett, 2
- Most fumbles returned for touchdown, career: Bobby Wagner, 3 and Chad Brown, 3
- Most fumbles returned for touchdown, season: DeMarcus Lawrence, 2 (2025); Bobby Wagner, 2 (2015); Shelton Robinson, 2 (1983); Chad Brown, 2 (1997)
- Most fumbles returned for touchdown, game: DeMarcus Lawrence, 2 (2025)
- Most passes defended, career: Marcus Trufant, 112
- Most passes defended, season: Richard Sherman, 24 (2012)
- Most passes defended, rookie season: Brandon Browner, 23 (2011)
- Most passes defended, game: Marcus Trufant, 5 (2003)
- Most passes defended, playoffs: Richard Sherman, 10

== Special teams ==
=== Kicking ===
- Most field goals attempted, career: Jason Myers, 232
- Most field goals attempted, season: Jason Myers, 48 (2025)
- Most field goals attempted, rookie season: John Kasay, 31 (1991)
- Most field goals attempted, game: 6 (four players), most recently Jason Myers (2025)
- Most field goals attempted, playoffs: Stephen Hauschka, 20
- Most field goals made, career: Jason Myers, 200
- Most field goals made, season: Jason Myers, 41 (2025)
- Most field goals made, rookie season: John Kasay, 25 (1991)
- Most field goals made, game: 6 Jason Myers (2025)
- Most field goals made, playoffs: Stephen Hauschka, 19
- Highest field goal percentage, career (min. 100 attempts): Stephen Hauschka, 88.8
- Highest field goal percentage, season (min. 20 attempts): Jason Myers, 100.0 (2020) (tied NFL record)
- Highest field goal percentage, rookie season (min. 20 attempts): John Kasay, 80.6 (1991)
- Highest field goal percentage, playoffs (min. 5 attempts): Stephen Hauschka, 95.0
- Most field goal attempts, 50+ yards, career: Jason Myers, 49
- Most field goals made, 50+ yards, career: Jason Myers, 35
- Most field goal attempts, 50+ yards, season: Jason Myers, 12 (2024 and 2025)
- Most field goals made, 50+ yards, season: Jason Myers, 9 (2024 and 2025)
- Most field goals made, 60+ yards, career: Jason Myers, 1
- Longest field goal made: Jason Myers, 61 yards (2020)
- Most consecutive field goals made: Jason Myers, 37 (2019–2021)
- Most extra points attempted, career: Norm Johnson, 338
- Most extra points attempted, season: Josh Brown, 57 (2005)
- Most extra points attempted, rookie season: Josh Brown, 48 (2003)
- Most extra points attempted, game: John Leypoldt, 8 (1977)
- Most extra points attempted, playoffs: Stephen Hauschka, 28
- Most extra points made, career: Norm Johnson, 333
- Most extra points made, season: Josh Brown, 56 (2005)
- Most extra points made, rookie season: Josh Brown, 48 (2003)
- Most extra points made, game: John Leypoldt, 8 (1977)
- Most extra points made, playoffs: Stephen Hauschka, 27
- Highest extra point percentage, career (min. 100 attempts): Todd Peterson, 100.0
- Most touchbacks, career: Jason Myers, 315
- Most touchbacks, season: Jason Myers, 59 (2019)
- Most kickoffs, career: Jason Myers, 627
- Most kickoffs, season: Jason Myers, 103 (2025)
- Most blocked field goals, career: Joe Nash, 8; Craig Terrill, 8
- Most blocked field goals, season: Joe Nash, 3 (1989); Craig Terrill, 3 (2010); Red Bryant, 3 (2011)
- Most blocked extra points, career: Mike White, 3
- Most blocked extra points, season: Mike White, 2 (1981)
- Most blocked kicks (FGs and XPs), career: Joe Nash, 10
- Most blocked kicks (FGs and XPs), season: Red Bryant, 4 (2011)

=== Punting ===
- Most punts, career: Jon Ryan, 770
- Most punts, season: Rick Tuten, 108 (1992)
- Most punts, rookie season: Ryan Plackemeier, 84 (2006)
- Longest punt, season: Jon Ryan, 77 (2011)
- Longest punt, rookie season: Ryan Plackemeier, 72 (2006)
- Highest punt yard average, career (min. 100 punts): Michael Dickson, 48.2
- Highest punt yard average, season (min. 50 punts): Michael Dickson, 50.0 (2023)
- Highest punt yard average, rookie season (min. 50 punts): Michael Dickson, 48.2 (2018)
- Highest punt net average, season: Michael Dickson, 44.4 (2020)
- Most punts inside the 20 yards, career: Jon Ryan, 276
- Most punts inside the 20 yards, season: Michael Dickson, 40 (2021)
- Most punt touchbacks, career: Jon Ryan, 60
- Most punt touchbacks, season: Ryan Plackemeier, 15 (2006)
- Most punts had blocked, career: Herman Weaver, 6
- Most punts had blocked, season: Herman Weaver, 3 (1979)
- Most blocked punts, career: Kerry Justin, 3

=== Return ===
- Longest kick return, career: Tyler Lockett, 105 (2015)
- Longest kick return, playoffs: Rashid Shaheed, 95 (2025)
- Most combined kick returns, career: Leon Washington, 231
- Most combined kick returns, season: Charlie Rogers, 92 (2000)
- Most kick return yards, career: Leon Washington, 4,398
- Most kick return yards, season: Charlie Rogers, 1,992 (2000)
- Most kick return yards, rookie season: Tyler Lockett, 1,231 (2015)
- Most kick return yards, game: Leon Washington, 253 (2010)
- Most kick returns for touchdown, career: Joey Galloway, 4; Leon Washington, 4
- Most kick returns for touchdown, season: Leon Washington, 3 (2010)
- Most combined attempts, career: Chris Warren, 1,943
- Most kickoff returns, career: Steve Broussard, 165
- Most kickoff returns, season: Josh Wilson, 69 (2008)
- Most kickoff returns, rookie season: Al Hunter, 36 (1977)
- Most kickoff return yards gained, career: Steve Broussard, 3,900
- Most kickoff return yards gained, season: Josh Wilson, 1,753 (2008)
- Most kickoff return yards gained, rookie season: Tyler Lockett, 852 (2015)
- Most kickoff returns yards gained, game: Leon Washington, 253 (2010)
- Highest kickoff return average, career (min. 50 kickoff returns): Leon Washington, 26.2
- Highest kickoff return average, season (min. 25 kickoff returns): Leon Washington, 29.0 (2012)
- Highest kickoff return average, rookie season (min. 25 kickoff returns): Tyler Lockett, 25.8 (2015)
- Most kickoff returns for touchdown, career: Leon Washington, 4
- Most kickoff returns for touchdown, season: Leon Washington, 3 (2010)
- Most kickoff returns for touchdown, game: Leon Washington, 2 (2010)
- Longest punt return, career: Tory Horton, 95 (2025)
- Longest punt return, playoffs: Koren Robinson, 49 (2003)
- Most punt returns, career: Nate Burleson, 125
- Most punt returns, season: Nate Burleson, 58 (2007)
- Most punt returns, rookie season: Will Lewis, 41 (1980)
- Most punt return yards gained, career: Nate Burleson, 1,288
- Most punt return yards gained, season: Nate Burleson, 658 (2007)
- Most punt return yards gained, rookie season: Bobby Joe Edmonds, 419 (1986)
- Most punt return yards gained, game: Tyler Lockett, 139 (2015)
- Most punt returns for touchdown, career: Joey Galloway, 4
- Most punt returns for touchdown, season: Joey Galloway, 2 (1998)
- Highest punt return yard average, career (min. 50 punt returns): Charlie Rogers, 12.7
- Highest punt return yard average, season (min. 20 punt returns): Charlie Rogers, 14.5 (1999)
- Highest punt return yard average, rookie season (min. 20 punt returns): Charlie Rogers, 14.5 (1999)
- Most punt return fair catches, career: Bobby Engram, 68
- Most punt return fair catches, season: Chris Warren, 25 (1992)

== Miscellaneous ==
- Most seasons: Joe Nash, 15
- Most games played, career: Joe Nash, 218
- Most games played, playoffs: Bobby Wagner, 16 and Russell Wilson, 16
- Most games started: Steve Largent, 197
- Most consecutive games played: Jon Ryan, 159
- Most consecutive games started: Russell Wilson, 149
- Most consecutive games started (including playoffs): Russell Wilson, 165
- Most points: Jason Myers, 892
- Most points, season: Jason Myers, 171 (2025)
- Most points, rookie season: Josh Brown, 114 (2003)
- Most points, game: Shaun Alexander, 30 (2002)
- Most points, playoffs: Stephen Hauschka, 84
- Most points per game, career: Stephen Hauschka, 7.9
- Most two-point conversion attempts, career: Chris Warren, 5
- Most two-point conversion made, career: Lamar Smith, 4
- Most two-point conversions made, season: Lamar Smith, 3 (1996)
- Most team two-point conversions made, game: 3 (Week 16, 2025)
- Most safeties: Rod Stephens, 2
- Most safeties, season: Rod Stephens, 2 (1993) (tied NFL record)
- Most safeties, playoffs: Cliff Avril, 1 and Kelly Jennings, 1
- Most all-purpose yards, career: Steve Largent, 13,396
- Most all-purpose yards, season: Charlie Rogers, 1,992 (2000)
- Most all-purpose yards, rookie season: Tyler Lockett, 1,915 (2015)
- Most all-purpose yards, game: Shaun Alexander, 273 (2001)
- Most all-purpose yards, playoffs: Marshawn Lynch, 1,122
- Most Pro Bowls made, career: Walter Jones, 9; Russell Wilson, 9; Bobby Wagner, 9
- Most First-team All-Pro selections, career: Bobby Wagner, 6
- Most combined All-Pro selections (First-team and Second-team), career: Bobby Wagner, 9
- Most team Pro Bowl selections, season: 7 players (1984, 2005, 2015, 2016, 2017, 2020)
- Most wins, season: 14 (2025)
- Most wins, playoffs: 9 (four players: Russell Wilson, Bobby Wagner, Kam Chancellor and Jon Ryan)
- Most wins (quarterback), career: Russell Wilson, 104
- Most wins (quarterback), season: Sam Darnold, 14 (2025)

== Coaching ==
- Most wins, career: Pete Carroll, 137
- Most wins, season: Mike Macdonald, 14 (2025)
- Most wins, rookie season: Mike Macdonald, 10 (2024)
- Most playoff wins, career: Pete Carroll, 10
- Most home playoff wins, career: Pete Carroll, 6
- Most road playoff wins, career: Pete Carroll, 3
- Most consecutive home wins: Pete Carroll, 14 (2013–2014)
- Most consecutive road wins: Mike Macdonald, 10 (2024–2025)
- Most ties, career: Pete Carroll, 1
- Most consecutive winning seasons, career: Pete Carroll, 9 (2012–2020)
- Most consecutive playoff appearances, career: Mike Holmgren, 5 (2003–2007); Pete Carroll, 5 (2012–2016)
- Highest win percentage, career: Mike Macdonald, .706
- Highest win percentage, playoffs: Pete Carroll, .526
- Most games coached, career: Pete Carroll, 227
- Most playoff appearances, career: Pete Carroll, 10
- Most division titles, career: Mike Holmgren, 5; Pete Carroll, 5
- Most Super Bowl appearances, career: Pete Carroll, 2
- Most Super Bowl wins, career: Pete Carroll, 1; Mike Macdonald, 1

== Career leaders ==
All lists are accurate through the 2025 season.

Bold denotes an active player.

=== Passing leaders ===
**Top 10 career**
**Name**	**Seasons**	**Yards**
Russell Wilson	2012–2021	37,059
Matt Hasselbeck	2001–2010	29,434
Dave Krieg	1980–1991	26,132
Jim Zorn	1976–1984	20,122
Geno Smith	2020–2024	12,961
Rick Mirer	1993–1996	9,094
Jon Kitna	1996–2000	7,552
Warren Moon	1997–1998	5,310
**Sam Darnold**	2025–present	4,048
Seneca Wallace	2003–2009	3,547

=== Points leaders ===
**Top 10 career**
**Name**	**Seasons**	**Points**
**Jason Myers**	2019–present	892
Norm Johnson	1982–1990	810
Stephen Hauschka	2011–2016	759
Shaun Alexander	2000–2007	672
Steve Largent	1976–1989	608
Josh Brown	2003–2007	571
Todd Peterson	1995–1999	555
Marshawn Lynch	2010–2015, 2019	398
Tyler Lockett	2015–2024	398
Curt Warner	1983–1989	372

=== Receiving leaders ===
**Top 10 career**
**Name**	**Seasons**	**Yards**
Steve Largent	1976–1989	13,089
Tyler Lockett	2015–2024	8,594
Brian Blades	1988–1998	7,620
Doug Baldwin	2011–2018	6,563
Darrell Jackson	2000–2006	6,445
DK Metcalf	2019–2024	6,324
Bobby Engram	2001–2008	4,859
Joey Galloway	1995–1999	4,457
John L. Williams	1986–1993	4,151
Koren Robinson	2001–2004, 2008	3,567

=== Reception leaders ===
**Top 10 career**
**Name**	**Seasons**	**Rec**
Steve Largent	1976–1989	819
Tyler Lockett	2015–2024	661
Brian Blades	1988–1998	581
Doug Baldwin	2011–2018	493
John L. Williams	1986–1993	471
Darrell Jackson	2000–2006	441
DK Metcalf	2019–2024	438
Bobby Engram	2001–2008	399
Joey Galloway	1995–1999	283
**Jaxon Smith-Njigba**	2023–present	282

=== Rushing leaders ===
**Top 10 career**
**Name**	**Seasons**	**Yards**
Shaun Alexander	2000–2007	9,429
Chris Warren	1990–1997	6,706
Curt Warner	1983–1989	6,705
Marshawn Lynch	2010–2015, 2019	6,381
Russell Wilson	2012–2021	4,689
John L. Williams	1986–1993	4,579
Ricky Watters	1998–2000	4,009
Kenneth Walker III	2022–2025	3,555
Chris Carson	2017–2021	3,502
Sherman Smith	1976–1982	3,429

=== Touchdown leaders ===
**Top 10 career**
**Name**	**Seasons**	**TDs**
Shaun Alexander	2000–2007	112
Steve Largent	1976–1989	101
Marshawn Lynch	2010–2015, 2019	66
Tyler Lockett	2015–2024	65
Curt Warner	1983–1989	62
Doug Baldwin	2011–2018	49
DK Metcalf	2019–2024	48
Chris Warren	1990–1997	48
Darrell Jackson	2000–2006	47
Joey Galloway	1995–1999	42

=== Passing TD leaders ===
**Top 10 career**
**Name**	**Seasons**	**TDs**
Russell Wilson	2012–2021	292
Dave Krieg	1980–1991	195
Matt Hasselbeck	2001–2010	174
Jim Zorn	1976–1984	107
Geno Smith	2020–2024	76
Jon Kitna	1997–2000	49
Rick Mirer	1993–1996	41
Warren Moon	1997–1998	36
**Sam Darnold**	2025–present	25
Seneca Wallace	2005–2009	25

=== Interception leaders ===
**Top 10 career**
**Name**	**Seasons**	**Ints**
Dave Brown	1976–1986	50
Eugene Robinson	1985–1995	42
John Harris	1978–1985	41
Richard Sherman	2011–2017	32
Kenny Easley	1981–1987	32
Earl Thomas	2010–2018	28
Marcus Trufant	2003–2012	21
Shawn Springs	1997–2003	20
Darryl Williams	1996–1999	20
Keith Simpson	1978–1985	19

=== Sack leaders ===
**Top 10 career**
**Name**	**Seasons**	**Sacks**
Jacob Green	1980–1991	115.5
Michael Sinclair	1992–2001	73.5
Jeff Bryant	1982–1993	63.0
Cortez Kennedy	1990–2000	58.0
Chad Brown	1997–2004	48.0
Joe Nash	1982–1996	47.5
Michael Bennett	2013–2017	39.0
Chris Clemons	2010–2013	38.0
Rufus Porter	1988–1994	37.5
**Jarran Reed**	2016–2020, 2023–present	36.0

=== Tackle leaders ===
**Top 10 career**
**Name**	**Seasons**	**Tackles**
Bobby Wagner	2012–2021, 2023	1,566
Eugene Robinson	1985–1995	983
K. J. Wright	2011–2020	941
Keith Butler	1978–1987	813
Joe Nash	1982–1996	779
Chad Brown	1997–2004	743
Cortez Kennedy	1990–2000	669
Earl Thomas	2010–2018	664
Marcus Trufant	2003–2012	646
Terry Wooden	1990–1996	625

=== Pro Bowl leaders ===
**Top 10 career**
**Name**	**Seasons**	**Made**
Bobby Wagner	2012–2021, 2023	9
Russell Wilson	2012–2021	9
Walter Jones	1997–2008	9
Cortez Kennedy	1990–2000	8
Steve Largent	1976–1989	7
Earl Thomas	2010–2018	6
Kenny Easley	1981–1987	5
Marshawn Lynch	2010–2015, 2019	4
Richard Sherman	2011–2017	4
Kam Chancellor	2010–2017	4
Fredd Young	1984–1987	4

=== Coaching wins leaders ===
**Top 5 career**
**Name**	**Seasons**	**Wins**
Pete Carroll	2010–2023	137
Mike Holmgren	1999–2008	86
Chuck Knox	1983–1991	80
Jack Patera	1976–1982	35
Dennis Erickson	1995–1998	31

== See also ==
- List of National Football League records (individual)
