= Steve Largent Award =

American football award

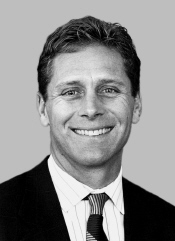
- Steve Largent, the namesake of the award
- Presented by: Seattle Seahawks

History
- First winner: Steve Largent, 1989
- Most wins: Mack Strong (5)
- Most recent: Julian Love, 2025

The Steve Largent Award is given by the Seattle Seahawks annually to the team contributor(s) best exemplifying the spirit, dedication, and integrity of former Seahawks wide receiver Steve Largent.

== Recipients ==
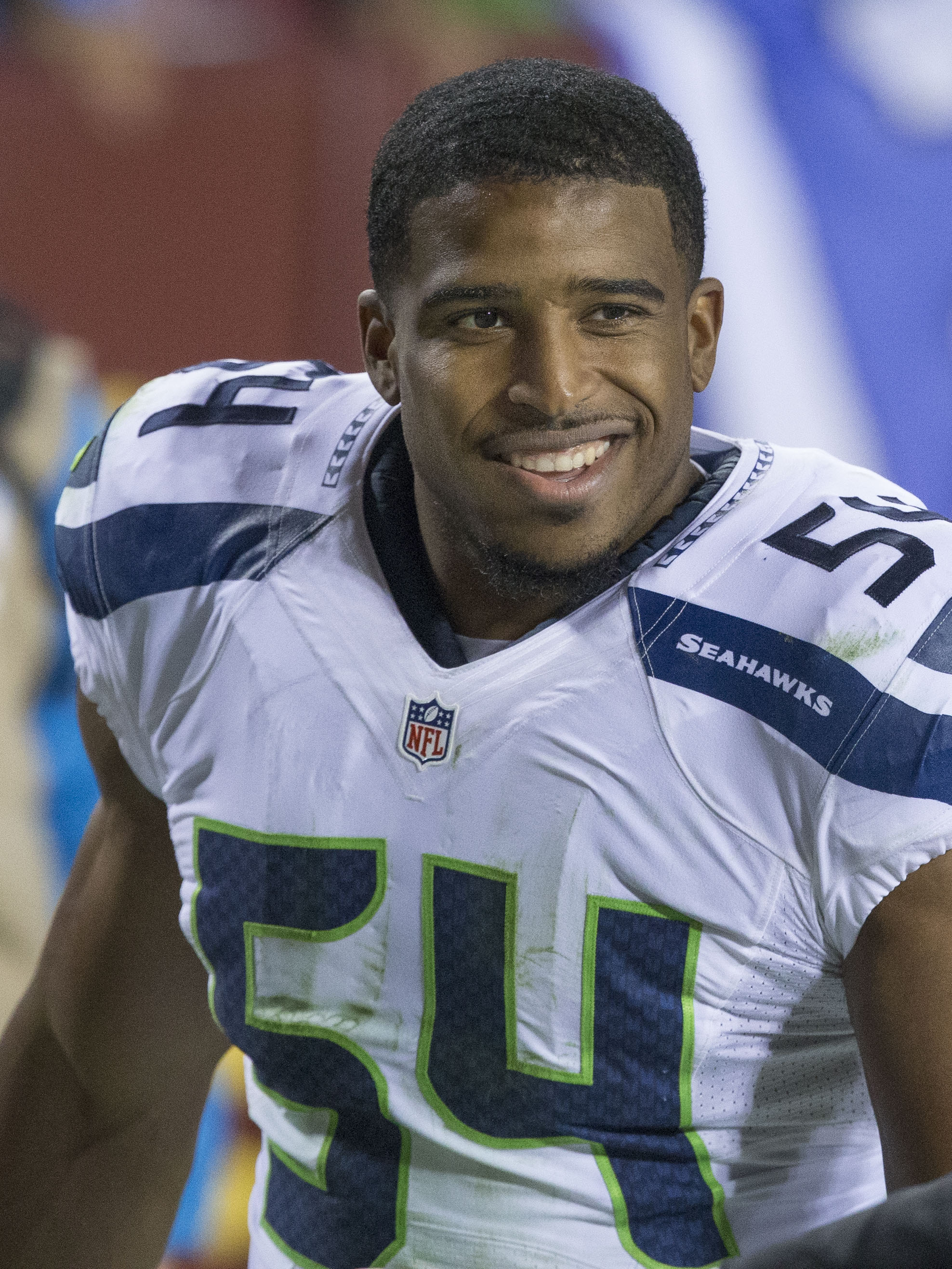
2017 & 2023 award recipient Bobby Wagner

Steve Largent Award Winners
| Season | Player | Position | Ref |
| 1989 | Steve Largent | WR | |
| 1990 | Jacob Green | DE | |
| 1991 | Rufus Porter | LB | |
| 1992 | Jeff Bryant | DE | |
| 1992 | Joe Nash | DT | |
| 1993 | Eugene Robinson | FS | |
| 1994 | Brian Blades | WR | |
| 1995 | Terry Wooden | LB | |
| 1996 | Cortez Kennedy | DT | |
| 1997 | Winston Moss | LB | |
| 1998 | Michael Sinclair | DE | |
| 1999 | Chad Brown | LB | |
| 2000 | Ricky Watters | RB | |
| 2001 | Mack Strong | FB | |
| 2002 | Mack Strong (2) | FB | |
| 2003 | Trent Dilfer | QB | |
| 2004 | Mack Strong (3) | FB | |
| 2005 | Mack Strong (4) | FB | |
| 2006 | Mack Strong (5) | FB | |
| 2007 | Bobby Engram | WR | |
| 2008 | Mike Holmgren | Head Coach | |
| 2009 | Matt Hasselbeck | QB | |
| 2010 | Roy Lewis | CB | |
| 2011 | Red Bryant | DT | |
| 2012 | Russell Wilson | QB | |
| 2013 | Earl Thomas | FS | |
| 2014 | Kam Chancellor | SS | |
| 2015 | Richard Sherman | CB | |
| 2016 | Kam Chancellor (2) | SS | |
| 2017 | Bobby Wagner | LB | |
| 2018 | Russell Wilson (2) | QB | |
| 2019 | Russell Wilson (3) | QB | |
| 2020 | K. J. Wright | LB | |
| 2021 | Tyler Lockett | WR | |
| 2022 | Tyler Lockett (2) | WR | |
| 2023 | Bobby Wagner (2) | LB | |
| 2024 | Tyler Lockett (3) | WR | |
| 2025 | Julian Love | Safety | |

== Multiple-time winners ==
List of multiple-time winners
| Awards | Player | Years | Hall of Fame induction |
|---|---|---|---|
| 5 | Mack Strong | 2001, 2002, 2004, 2005, 2006 | No |
| 3 | Russell Wilson | 2012, 2018, 2019 | Eligible in 2031 |
| 3 | Tyler Lockett | 2021, 2022, 2024 | Active |
| 2 | Kam Chancellor | 2014, 2016 | No |
| 2 | Bobby Wagner | 2017, 2023 | Active |
