= Fallbrook Union High School =

High school in California, United States

Location
- 2400 South Stage Coach Lane; Fallbrook, California; 33.3650°N 117.2431°W

Information
- Type: Public
- Established: 1893
- Founder: Rev. William Pittenger
- School district: Fallbrook Union High School District
- Grades: 9–12
- Enrollment: 1,900 (2023–2024)
- Colors: Red and White
- Sports: Football, Baseball, Basketball, Cross Country, Golf, Lacrosse, Rugby, Soccer, Swimming, Tennis, Track, Volleyball, Water Polo, Wrestling
- Mascot: The Warriors
- Website: www.fallbrookhs.org

Fallbrook Union High School (also referred to as FUHS, Fallbrook High School and FHS) is a public high school located in the rural community of Fallbrook, California. It is a part of the Fallbrook Union High School District. Established in 1893, FUHS is the second-oldest high school in San Diego County. The school teaches students in grades 9 through 12.

== Sports ==
Fallbrook Union High School competes in the Avocado League and in Division III CIF. In 1986 and 2000 the varsity football team won CIF championships.

The school also competes in the boys' sports of baseball, basketball, cross country, football, golf, lacrosse, rugby, soccer, swimming, tennis, track, volleyball, water polo, and wrestling, as well as competing in the girls' sports of basketball, cross country, field hockey, golf, gymnastics, lacrosse, rugby, soccer, softball, swimming, tennis, track, volleyball, and water polo. Fallbrook's girls' rugby U-18 team have been high school national champions five times: 2011, 2012, 2013, 2014, and 2015.

== History ==
The school was first opened in 1893 for 20 students. It was founded by Civil War Medal of Honor recipient Rev. William Pittenger.

In 1911, the Fallbrook High School board voted for a $20,000 20-year bond for construction of a new high school.

In the 1930s, the Public Works Administration Project approved a grant of $34,000, 45% of the cost of a new auditorium-gymnasium-cafeteria, a pool and grading of a sports field.

In 1934–1938, the student body voted on the school colors of red and white. The athletic teams were named "The Warriors" in honor of the large number of Native-Americans in the student body.

In 1939, Fallbrook Union High School was rated the most outstanding high school in the country by Chicago Farm Foundation.

In 1946, the State Department of Education rated Fallbrook to be the best small high school in California.

In 1948, the State of California declared that the main part of the school building did not meet earthquake standards and was condemned. A new building was built the following year.

In 1953, a $325,000 bond was passed to move the school to a site south of town. The 46,000-square-foot project was delayed due to county-wide strikes by brick masons and an unusually rainy year.

In 1967, a $900,000 bond was passed to add a cafeteria, classrooms and bus-loading facilities.

In 1994, a $23 million bond to improve the facilities and to ease the overcrowding problem was approved by Fallbrook voters. The project included a new gym, performing arts center, agriculture center, media center and vocational arts buildings.

Robert Thomas also retired in 1994 and Joe Diminicantanio was appointed superintendent. Enrollment had reached an all-time record of 2,300 students.

Construction began during summer 1996 on the five new buildings. Included are a $3.3 million, 27,000-square-foot gymnasium; $5 million performing arts center; $834,000 agricultural center; $4.5 million media center and a $2 million vocational arts building. The project took almost 6 years to complete with the last building opening in the fall of 2000. The impressive Bob Burton Center for the Performing Arts is a joint community-school facility and is named after Bob Burton, the Student Activities Director of thirty years.

In 1997, Diminicantanio retired and Thomas Anthony was appointed as superintendent.

As of 2007, the Fallbrook High School campus is home to a wide range of comprehensive high school offerings and is also home to Oasis and Ivy High School. Collectively the campus provides educational facilities for more than 3,000 students.

In 2016, district residents approved issuing $45 million in bonds for upgrading classrooms and facilities and improving school security. The initiative was passed by 64.75% of voters.

=== Student population ===
- 1893: 20 students
- 1934–1938: 160 students
- 1950: 244 students
- 1953: 539 students
- 1958: 750 students
- 1978: 1875 students
- 1994: 2300 students
- 2007: more than 3000
- 2015–2016: 2071 students

== Notable alumni ==
- Kayla Canett, rugby union player and Olympic Bronze Medallist
- Matt Chico, former pitcher for the Washington Nationals of Major League Baseball
- Michael Curtis, television writer and producer (Friends, "JONAS")
- John Dutton, former professional quarterback
- Janice Eberly, former Assistant Secretary of the Treasury for Economic Policy and Chief Economist.
- Aimee La Joie, actress
- Mike Leake, pitcher for the Seattle Mariners of Major League Baseball
- Donny Lucy, former MLB catcher for the Chicago White Sox
- Brent Noon, shot putter
- Ryan Plackemeier, former punter of the National Football League
- Paula Tiso, voice-over actress, broadcast television voice-over
- Chris Toth, professional beach and indoor soccer goalkeeper for the United States national beach soccer team and the Tacoma Stars of the Major Arena Soccer League.
- Arielle Vandenberg (Class of 2004), actress and model
