= Mack Strong =

American football player (born 1971)

No. 38
- Position: Fullback

Personal information
- Born: September 11, 1971 (age 55); Fort Benning, Georgia, U.S.
- Listed height: 6 ft 0 in (1.83 m)
- Listed weight: 253 lb (115 kg)

Career information
- High school: Brookstone School (Columbus, Georgia)
- College: Georgia
- NFL draft: 1993: undrafted

Career history
- Seattle Seahawks (1993–2007)

Awards and highlights
- First-team All-Pro (2005); 2× Pro Bowl (2005, 2006); Seattle Seahawks 35th Anniversary team; Seattle Seahawks Top 50 players

Career NFL statistics
- Rushing yards: 909
- Rushing average: 4
- Rushing touchdowns: 5
- Receptions: 218
- Receiving yards: 1,456
- Receiving touchdowns: 10
- Stats at Pro Football Reference

Mack Carlington Strong (born September 11, 1971) is an American former professional football player who was a fullback for the Seattle Seahawks of the National Football League (NFL) for 15 seasons. After playing college football for the Georgia Bulldogs, he was signed by the Seahawks as an undrafted free agent in 1993. Strong was selected the Pro Bowl twice in his career, in 2005 and 2006. He currently is a football sportscaster for Root Sports Northwest. He won the Steve Largent Award a record 5 times while with the Seahawks.

== Early life ==
Mack Strong was born in Fort Benning, Georgia. He attended Brookstone School in Columbus, Georgia, and was a letterman in football, basketball, and track. In football, he had 4,414 rushing yards and 86 touchdowns during his career.

== College career ==
He was recruited by teams all over the south, and in 1989 Strong opted to stay home and sign with the University of Georgia Bulldogs. The tradition of running backs at that school, which included Herschel Walker, led Strong to believe there was a real opportunity to make it to the NFL as a tailback. The Bulldogs had a couple of older running backs named Tim Worley and Rodney Hampton, both future first-round picks, so Strong had trouble finding playing time as a freshman. By his sophomore season, the team added top recruit Garrison Hearst and a ballyhooed transfer from Long Beach State named Terrell Davis. If Strong hadn't done the math, his coaches did it for him. He was told he could either move to fullback and block for the others, or he could sit and watch them from the bench.

Strong became a full-time starter at fullback for his final two years at Georgia, earning the honor of offensive captain as a senior. His blocking helped Hearst get drafted in the first round, while Davis went on to become a late-round NFL success story who went on to win Super Bowl MVP honors. As their workmanlike bodyguard, Strong was all but overlooked at Georgia. Despite his quiet leadership, blue-collar work ethic and impressive blocking style, he went undrafted after his senior season.

Despite being primarily a blocker, Strong amassed 1,210 yards rushing and receiving, and scored 10 touchdowns as a Georgia Bulldog.

== Professional career ==
Originally signed as free agent out of Georgia, Strong played his entire 14-year career with the Seahawks and received the Steve Largent Award a record five times (2001, 2002, 2004–2006). He blocked for three 1,000-yard rushers: Chris Warren, Ricky Watters, and Shaun Alexander. He held the Seahawks team record for longest rush in a playoff game with a 32-yard run during the 2005 divisional playoff game against the Washington Redskins until Marshawn Lynch's 67-yard rush against the Saints on January 8, 2011.

In 2005 Strong was selected to his first NFL Pro Bowl and chosen as an Associated Press All-Pro. He was known as one of the best blocking fullbacks in the NFL. Strong was again selected to the Pro Bowl in 2006.

== Retirement ==
In the 2007 season Strong suffered a herniated disk in his vertebrae in his neck against the Pittsburgh Steelers. The injury was said not to be life-threatening if Strong discontinued his playing of football. On October 8, 2007, Strong announced his retirement after 15 seasons due to this injury. After discussions with head coach Mike Holmgren, he was able to take on a position assisting the team's running backs. While being interviewed on Monday Night Football on November 12, 2007, he hinted at a possible future in the broadcast booth. Strong and his wife, Zoe, devote their time to working with the Washington Chapter of HOPE worldwide, a non-profit organization. He is a founder of their signature program in Washington state, the Mack Strong TEAM-WORKS Academy.

== Personal life ==
Strong and his family currently reside in Issaquah, Washington.

== Broadcasting career ==
On July 30, 2008, Fox Sports Northwest (now Root Sports Northwest) announced that Strong would be joining the network's talent team. In addition to providing insight and commentary on FSN's Seahawks coverage, he also was given his own show, titled "Mack Strong: Seahawks Insider". The show ended in 2011.
