= Brookstone School =

Prep school in Columbus, Georgia, US

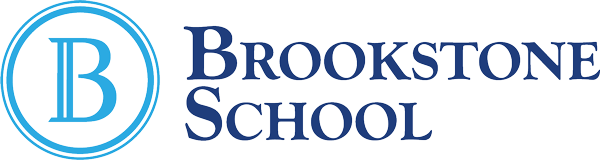

Location
- 440 Bradley Park Drive; Columbus, Georgia 31904; United States
- Coordinates: 32°31′41″N 84°59′15″W

Information
- Type: Private, college-preparatory school
- Established: 1951
- NCES School ID: 00297394
- Head of school: Henry F. Heil
- Teaching staff: 85.8 in K–12 (on an FTE basis)
- Grades: PK–12
- Gender: Co-educational
- Enrollment: 727 in K–12 (2017-2018)
- Student to teacher ratio: 8.5 in K–12
- Colors: Blue and white
- Nickname: Cougars
- Website: www.brookstoneschool.org

Brookstone School is a private, college-preparatory school in Columbus, Georgia, United States. It was established in 1951.

== History ==
The school was opened in September 10, 1951 as Trinity Parish School by Charles Strum Nauss II, a former student of Grace Fernald. The original campus was at 2112 Wynnton Road ("the old D. Abbott Turner home" at Brown Road) teaching grades from kindergarten to 4th grade (plans were in place to expand through 6th grade), with an emphasis on learning through sight, hearing, and the kinesthetic approach pioneered by Fernald. Although the school was sponsored by Episcopalians, it was not restricted to members of that denomination; but the school was under the control of Trinity Episcopal Parish and students were to receive religious instruction from the Rector of Trinity, Colin R. Campbell.

== Athletics ==
Brookstone has women's teams in 13 sports and men's teams in 11 sports.

== Notable alumni ==
- Chris Edmonds, NFL player
- Marshall Leonard, MLS player
- Dmitri Matheny, jazz flugelhornist
- Mack Strong, NFL player
- Tim Wilson, stand-up comedian and country music artist
- Joshua McKoon, Georgia Republican Party Chairman
