= List of NFL annual tackles leaders =

In American football, a tackle is when a defensive player forces the player with the ball to the ground or out of bounds to stop the runner from advancing downfield and to end the play. This is a list of National Football League (NFL) players who have led the regular season in solo and combined tackles each year. Tackles are not an official stat recorded by the NFL and are tracked by a scorekeeper of the home team. Pro Football Reference has combined tackle numbers dating back to the 1978 season and solo tackle numbers back to the 1994 season. However, combined tackle numbers before the 1987 season are incomplete and limited to few players.

The record for most solo tackles is held by Ray Lewis, who made 156 in the 1997 season, while the record for most combined tackles belongs to Hardy Nickerson, who made 214 in 1993.

== NFL annual combined tackles leaders ==
Key
Symbol	Meaning
Leader	The player who recorded the most combined tackles in the NFL
Combined tackles	The total number of combined tackles the player had
GP	The number of games played by a player during the season
†	Inducted into the Pro Football Hall of Fame
^	Active player
*	Set the single-season combined tackle record
(#)	Denotes the number of times a player appears in this list

Note that the combined tackle totals from 1978 to 1986 are incomplete.

NFL annual combined tackle leaders by season
Season	Leader	Combined tackles	GP	Team
1978	Clay Matthews Jr.	34*	15	Cleveland Browns
1979	Clay Matthews Jr. (2)	103*	16	Cleveland Browns
1980	Monte Coleman	118*	16	Washington Redskins
1981	Clay Matthews Jr. (3)	128*	16	Cleveland Browns
1982	Ronnie Lott†	68	9	San Francisco 49ers
1983	Dennis Smith	114	14	Denver Broncos
1984	Clay Matthews Jr. (4)	126	16	Cleveland Browns
1985	Kyle Clifton	160*	16	New York Jets
1986	Kyle Clifton (2)	174*	16	New York Jets
1987	Jesse Solomon	126	12	Minnesota Vikings
1988	Kyle Clifton (3)	162	16	New York Jets
1989	Byron Evans	184*	16	Philadelphia Eagles
1990	Jessie Tuggle	201*	16	Atlanta Falcons
1991	Jessie Tuggle (2)	207*	16	Atlanta Falcons
1992	Jessie Tuggle (3)	193	15	Atlanta Falcons
1993	Hardy Nickerson	214*	16	Tampa Bay Buccaneers
1994	Chris Spielman	195	16	Detroit Lions
1995	Jessie Tuggle (4)	152	16	Atlanta Falcons
1996	Victor Green	165	16	New York Jets
1997	Ray Lewis†	184	16	Baltimore Ravens
1998	Derrick Brooks†	158	16	Tampa Bay Buccaneers
1999	Ray Lewis† (2)	165	16	Baltimore Ravens
2000	Mike Peterson	160	16	Indianapolis Colts
2001	Ray Lewis† (3)	162	16	Baltimore Ravens
2002	Zach Thomas†	156	16	Miami Dolphins
2003	Jamie Sharper	166	16	Houston Texans
2004	Keith Bullock	152	16	Tennessee Titans
2004	Donnie Edwards	152	16	San Diego Chargers
2005	Jonathan Vilma	173	16	New York Jets
2006	Zach Thomas† (2)	165	16	Miami Dolphins
2007	Patrick Willis†	174	16	San Francisco 49ers
2008	D'Qwell Jackson	154	16	Cleveland Browns
2009	Patrick Willis† (2)	152	16	San Francisco 49ers
2010	Jerod Mayo	174	16	New England Patriots
2011	London Fletcher	166	16	Washington Redskins
2012	Luke Kuechly†	164	16	Carolina Panthers
2013	Vontaze Burfict	171	16	Cincinnati Bengals
2014	Luke Kuechly† (2)	164	16	Carolina Panthers
2015	NaVorro Bowman	154	16	San Francisco 49ers
2016	Bobby Wagner	167	16	Seattle Seahawks
2017	Blake Martinez	144	16	Green Bay Packers
2017	Joe Schobert	144	16	Cleveland Browns
2017	Preston Brown	144	16	Buffalo Bills
2018	Shaquille Leonard	163	15	Indianapolis Colts
2019	Bobby Wagner (2)	159	16	Seattle Seahawks
2020	Zach Cunningham	164	16	Houston Texans
2021	Foyesade Oluokun^	192	17	Atlanta Falcons
2022	Foyesade Oluokun^ (2)	184	17	Jacksonville Jaguars
2023	Bobby Wagner (3)	183	17	Seattle Seahawks
2024	Zaire Franklin^	173	17	Indianapolis Colts
2025	Jordyn Brooks^	183	17	Miami Dolphins

== Most seasons leading the league ==
Count	Player	Seasons	Team(s)
4	Clay Matthews Jr.	1978, 1979, 1981, 1984	Cleveland Browns
4	Jessie Tuggle	1990, 1991, 1992, 1995	Atlanta Falcons
3	Kyle Clifton	1985, 1986, 1988	New York Jets
3	Ray Lewis	1997, 1999, 2001	Baltimore Ravens
3	Bobby Wagner	2016, 2019, 2023	Seattle Seahawks
2	Luke Kuechly	2012, 2014	Carolina Panthers
2	Foyesade Oluokun	2021, 2022	Atlanta Falcons / Jacksonville Jaguars
2	Zach Thomas	2002, 2006	Miami Dolphins
2	Patrick Willis	2007, 2009	San Francisco 49ers

== NFL annual solo tackles leaders ==
Key
Symbol	Meaning
Leader	The player who recorded the most solo tackles in the NFL
Solo tackles	The total number of solo tackles the player had
GP	The number of games played by a player during the season
†	Inducted into the Pro Football Hall of Fame
^	Active player
*	Set the single-season solo tackle record
(#)	Denotes the number of times a player appears in this list

NFL annual solo tackle leaders by season
Season	Leader	Solo tackles	GP	Team
1994	Junior Seau†	124*	16	San Diego Chargers
1994	Chris Spielman	124*	16	Detroit Lions
1995	Terry Wooden	114	16	Seattle Seahawks
1996	Victor Green	123	16	New York Jets
1997	Ray Lewis†	156*	16	Baltimore Ravens
1998	Derrick Brooks†	123	16	Tampa Bay Buccaneers
1999	Ray Lewis† (2)	130	16	Baltimore Ravens
2000	Derrick Brooks† (2)	123	16	Tampa Bay Buccaneers
2001	Ray Lewis† (3)	114	16	Baltimore Ravens
2002	Brian Urlacher†	117	16	Chicago Bears
2003	Keith Brooking	126	16	Atlanta Falcons
2004	Derrick Brooks† (3)	109	16	Tampa Bay Buccaneers
2005	Jonathan Vilma	128	16	New York Jets
2006	DeMeco Ryans	126	16	Houston Texans
2007	Patrick Willis†	136	16	San Francisco 49ers
2008	Jon Beason	110	16	Carolina Panthers
2009	Patrick Willis† (2)	114	16	San Francisco 49ers
2010	Jerod Mayo	113	16	New England Patriots
2011	D'Qwell Jackson	116	16	Cleveland Browns
2012	James Laurinaitis	117	16	St. Louis Rams
2013	Paul Posluszny	122	15	Jacksonville Jaguars
2014	DeAndre Levy	117	16	Detroit Lions
2015	NaVorro Bowman	116	16	San Francisco 49ers
2016	Kwon Alexander	108	16	Tampa Bay Buccaneers
2017	Demario Davis^	97	16	New York Jets
2017	Bobby Wagner	97	16	Seattle Seahawks
2018	Shaquille Leonard	111	15	Indianapolis Colts
2019	Budda Baker^	104	16	Arizona Cardinals
2020	Zach Cunningham	106	16	Houston Texans
2021	Jordyn Brooks^	109	17	Seattle Seahawks
2022	Foyesade Oluokun^	128	17	Jacksonville Jaguars
2023	Foyesade Oluokun^ (2)	111	17	Jacksonville Jaguars
2024	Jamien Sherwood^	98	17	New York Jets
2025	Jordyn Brooks^ (2)	99	17	Miami Dolphins

== Most seasons leading the league ==
Count	Player	Seasons	Team(s)
3	Derrick Brooks	1998, 2000, 2004	Tampa Bay Buccaneers
3	Ray Lewis	1997, 1999, 2001	Baltimore Ravens
2	Jordyn Brooks	2021, 2025	Seattle Seahawks / Miami Dolphins
2	Foyesade Oluokon	2022, 2023	Jacksonville Jaguars
2	Patrick Willis	2007, 2009	San Francisco 49ers

== See also ==
- List of NFL career tackles leaders
