= Roy Lewis (American football) =

American football player (born 1985)

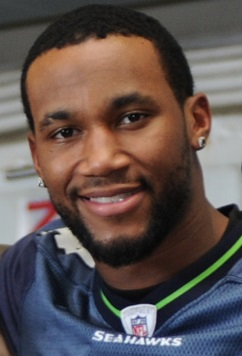
- Lewis in 2012

No. 30, 34
- Position: Cornerback

Personal information
- Born: May 19, 1985 (age 41); Los Angeles, California, U.S.
- Listed height: 5 ft 10 in (1.78 m)
- Listed weight: 190 lb (86 kg)

Career information
- High school: Narbonne (Harbor City, California)
- College: Washington
- NFL draft: 2008: undrafted

Career history
- Pittsburgh Steelers (2008); Seattle Seahawks (2009–2011)

Awards and highlights
- Super Bowl champion (XLIII)

Career NFL statistics
- Total tackles: 53
- Sacks: 1.5
- Forced fumbles: 1
- Fumble recoveries: 3
- Pass deflections: 5
- Stats at Pro Football Reference

Roy Lewis, Jr. (born May 19, 1985) is an American former professional football player who was a cornerback in the National Football League (NFL). He was signed by the Pittsburgh Steelers as an undrafted free agent in 2008. He played college football for the Washington Huskies. With the Steelers, he won Super Bowl XLIII against the Arizona Cardinals. He is now a firefighter for the City of Phoenix in Arizona.

== College career ==
Lewis was named a team captain as a senior at Washington, initially enrolled at San Jose State but transferred to Washington following his freshman year; eventually he earned a major in American ethnic studies. He was named Pac-10 defensive player of the week and the team's defensive MVP after the win over Boise State in 2007. Lewis, who played linebacker and cornerback in high school and college, impressed Steelers coach Mike Tomlin with his physical play, leading the coaching staff to give him an opportunity at the safety position.

== Professional career ==
=== Pittsburgh Steelers ===
Lewis was signed by the Steelers as an undrafted rookie free agent on April 28, 2008. After playing 1 game with the team in 2008, Lewis spent the 2009 preseason with the Steelers before being cut on September 4, 2009. He was activated on October 28.

=== Seattle Seahawks ===
Lewis was claimed off waivers by the Seahawks on September 6, 2009. He was activated on October 28. Following the 2010 season, Lewis was presented with the Steve Largent Award and the team's Man of the Year Award.
