= Chris Toth =

American beach and indoor soccer goalkeeper

Personal information
- Full name: Christopher Zoltan Toth
- Date of birth: August 4, 1989 (age 37)
- Place of birth: San Diego, California, U.S.
- Height: 6 ft 1 in (1.85 m)
- Position: Goalkeeper

Team information
- Current team: Tacoma Stars

Youth career
- Fallbrook High School

Senior career*
Years	Team	Apps	(Gls)
2008–2018	San Diego Sockers	89	
2018–2020	Ontario Fury	61	
2022-2023	Empire Strykers	22	
2020–	Tacoma Stars	28	
2025–2028	San Diego Sockers		

International career
2013–	United States (beach soccer)	104	
- * Club domestic league appearances and goals

Christopher Zoltan Toth (born August 4, 1989) is an American soccer goalkeeper who plays for the Tacoma Stars in the Major Arena Soccer League (MASL) and the United States beach soccer team. He has represented the U.S. in multiple FIFA Beach Soccer World Cups and is a five-time MASL Goalkeeper of the Year.

== Early life ==
Christopher Zoltan Toth was born on August 4, 1989, in San Diego, California. He was diagnosed at birth with transposition of the great arteries, a congenital heart defect requiring two surgeries, one as an infant and another during high school, to correct reversed pulmonary and aortic arteries. Despite medical advice against sports, Toth pursued soccer, inspired by his family’s goalkeeping legacy. His grandfather, Gyorgy Toth, played for Hungary alongside Ferenc Puskás, his father, Zoltan Toth, was a hall-of-fame indoor goalkeeper for the San Diego Sockers, and his grandmother was a handball goalkeeper. Toth attended Fallbrook High School, earning all-county honors as a junior and senior and selection to the North County All-Stars in his senior year.

== Career ==
=== Beach soccer ===
Toth has been the starting goalkeeper for the United States men's national beach soccer team since 2013, amassing 104 caps with a 53–51 record. He has represented the U.S. in four FIFA Beach Soccer World Cups: 2013 (Tahiti), 2019 (Paraguay), 2021 (Russia), and 2024 (Dubai), where he served as captain, made 18 saves in one match, scored a goal against the United Arab Emirates, and earned his 100th cap during the tournament (becoming the first U.S. beach soccer player to reach the milestone since U.S. Soccer began overseeing the discipline).

Toth has competed in seven CONCACAF Beach Soccer Championships (2013, 2015, 2017, 2019, 2021, 2023, 2025), contributing to U.S. titles in 2013 and 2023, runner-up finishes in 2019 and 2021, and a third-place finish in 2025.

His individual honors include the CONCACAF Golden Gloves (2013), Mundialito Golden Gloves (2016, 2022), Balaton Cup champion and Golden Gloves (2018), and selection among the top 50 beach soccer players in the world every year from 2017 to 2023. He also won two Hungarian Beach Soccer League (MLSZ) championships (2017, 2018).

In January 2026, Toth was not selected for the 15-player training camp roster under new head coach Marcelo Mendes, the team's first activity since the 2025 CONCACAF Championship.

=== Indoor soccer ===
Toth began his professional indoor soccer career with the San Diego Sockers in the Major Arena Soccer League (MASL) in 2008, playing alongside his father, Zoltan, who coached his development. He won three MASL championships with the Sockers and was named to the All-PASL Honorable Mention in 2013–14 after posting a 12–3 record and a .735 save percentage. In 2018, Toth joined the Ontario Fury, seeking more starting opportunities, and won MASL Player of the Week honors in 2020 after a 7–3 victory over the Milwaukee Wave. Since 2020, he has played for the Tacoma Stars, earning his fourth MASL Goalkeeper of the Year award in 2024 with 15 wins in 21 starts and 276 saves. Toth earned his fifth Goalkeeper of the year in 2025. As of January 2026, he holds MASL career records including 79–17 regular season and 11–6 playoffs with the Sockers, 22–20 with the Fury, and 25–18 regular season / 1–2 playoffs with the Stars; he is also the league's all-time leader in saves (2,429), games played (186), and save percentage (.736). Toth signed a 3-year deal with the Sockers through 2028.

In 2011, Toth trained with Hungarian clubs Újpest FC, Egri FC, and Győr ETO FC.

Toth is currently the starting goalkeeper for the San Diego Sockers in the Major Arena Soccer League (MASL). He began his professional indoor career with the Sockers (2009–2018), helping the team win three PASL Championships (2011–2013), three U.S. Open Cup titles (2010–2012), and a FIFRA Club Championship (2012). After departing San Diego, Toth played for the Ontario Fury (2018–2020, 2022–2023) and Tacoma Stars (2020, 2023–2025), before returning to the Sockers on a three-year contract ahead of the 2025–26 season.

He is a five-time MASL Goalkeeper of the Year (2016–17 and 2017–18 with San Diego; 2019–20 with Ontario; 2023–24 and 2024–25 with Tacoma), the only player in league history to win the award with three different teams. Toth has earned multi-time All-League First Team selections (2017, 2018, 2020, 2024, 2025), along with earlier honors including Third Team (2015) and Honorable Mention (2019, 2021). As of January 2026, he holds MASL career records including 79–17 regular season and 11–6 playoffs with the Sockers, 22–20 with the Fury, and 25–18 regular season / 1–2 playoffs with the Stars; he is also the league's all-time leader in saves (2,429), games played (186), and save percentage (.736).

== Coaching ==
He provides goalkeeping training for youth clubs, including Cardiff Sockers and Rancho Santa Fe, mentoring young players.

== Statistics ==
=== MASL and PASL goalkeeping statistics. ===
Year	League	Team	GP	min	W	L	GA	GAA	Shots Faced	Saves	CS	Save %
2010–11	PASL	San Diego Sockers	3	180:35	3	0	18	6.00	53	35	0	.660
2011–12	PASL	San Diego Sockers	8	371:00	6	0	20	3.23	113	93	0	.823
2012–13	PASL	San Diego Sockers	7	390:00	6	0	25	3.85	111	86	0	.775
2013–14	PASL	San Diego Sockers	15	908:23	12	3	74	4.89	279	205	0	.735
2014–15	MASL	San Diego Sockers	15	891:25	12	3	68	4.58	249	181	0	.727
2015–16	MASL	San Diego Sockers	18	1066:28	11	7	101	5.68	348	247	0	.710
2016–17	MASL	San Diego Sockers	11	656:00	9	2	40	3.66	216	176	0	.815
2017–18	MASL	San Diego Sockers	12	711:00	10	2	45	3.80	179	134	1	.749
2018–19	MASL	Ontario Fury	24	1487:00	11	13	116	4.68	420	304	0	.724
2019–20	MASL	Ontario Fury	18	1037:00	11	7	82	4.74	314	232	1	.739
2020–21	MASL	Tacoma Stars	7	387:00	3	3	34	5.27	119	85	0	.714
2021–22	MASL	Ontario Fury	19	905:00	6	8	79	5.24	289	210	0	.727
2022–23	MASL	Empire Strykers	22	1263:00	12	9	106	5.04	407	301	0	.740
2023–24	MASL	Tacoma Stars	21	1218:00	15	4	114	5.62	390	276	0	.708
2024–25*	MASL	Tacoma Stars	19	-	-	-	-	-	-	279		.752
Career			200	11,472	127	61	922	~4.82	3,487	2,565	2	.736

*Statistical update needed for the 2024–2025 season

=== MASL and PASL scoring statistics. ===
Year	League	Team	GP	GS	G	A	Pts	PIM	FC	Shts
2010–11	PASL	San Diego Sockers	3	0	0	0	0	2	0	0
2011–12	PASL	San Diego Sockers	8	0	0	3	3	0	2	1
2012–13	PASL	San Diego Sockers	7	0	0	3	3	0	1	0
2013–14	PASL	San Diego Sockers	15	0	0	4	4	0	0	0
2014–15	MASL	San Diego Sockers	15	0	0	1	1	2	0	0
2015–16	MASL	San Diego Sockers	18	0	0	0	0		0	0
2016–17	MASL	San Diego Sockers	11	0	0	2	2	0	0	0
2017–18	MASL	San Diego Sockers	12	0	0	6	6	0	0	0
2018–19	MASL	Ontario Fury	24	0	1	4	5	12	0	0
2019–20	MASL	Ontario Fury	18	0	0	5	5	7	0	0
2020–21	MASL	Tacoma Stars	7	0	0	0	0	4:00	0	0
2021–22	MASL	Ontario Fury	19	0	1	3	0	0:00	0	0
2022–23	MASL	Empire Strykers	22	0	0	3	0	0:00	0	0
2023–24	MASL	Tacoma Stars	21	0	1	6	0	4:00	0	0
Totals			200	0	3	40	29	31	3	1

- Total Appearances: 200
- Total Saves: 2,565

=== Beach Soccer ===
Competition	Tournament	Games	Goals	Assists	GS
Beach WC	Beach Soccer World Cup 2013	?	?	?	?
Beach WC	Beach Soccer World Cup 2019	3	1	0	?
Beach WC	Beach Soccer World Cup 2021	3	0	2	?
Mundialito	Mundialito Praia 2022	3	1	1	?
Beach WC	Beach Soccer World Cup 2024	3	1	0	

== Personal life ==
Toth resides in San Marcos, California, and is known for his dedication to training, often arriving first and leaving last at practice. His father, Zoltan Toth, has been his primary goalkeeping coach. Toth was born with a congenital heart defect, he underwent two surgeries to correct the condition, enabling his professional career.

== Honors ==
=== Beach soccer ===
==== Team Honors (United States Men's National Beach Soccer Team) ====
- CONCACAF Beach Soccer Championship winners: 2013, 2023
- CONCACAF Beach Soccer Championship runners-up: 2019, 2021
- CONCACAF Beach Soccer Championship third place: 2025
- Balaton Cup winners: 2018

==== Individual Honors ====
- CONCACAF Beach Soccer Championship/Qualifiers Golden Gloves (Best Goalkeeper): 2013
- Mundialito Golden Gloves (Best Goalkeeper): 2016, 2022
- Balaton Cup Golden Gloves (Best Goalkeeper): 2018
- Beach Soccer Worldwide Top 50 Players in the World: Selected every year from 2017 to 2023 (7 consecutive years)

==== Club/Other Honors ====
- Hungarian Beach Soccer League (MLSZ) champions: 2017, 2018

=== Indoor soccer ===
San Diego Sockers

- PASL Championship: 2011, 2012, 2013
- U.S. Open Cup: 2010, 2011, 2012
- FIFRA Club Championship: 2012

Individual

- MASL Goalkeeper of the Year: 2016–17, 2017–18, 2019–20, 2023–24, 2024–25 *the only player to win with three different teams.
- MASL All-League First Team: 2017, 2018, 2020, 2024, 2025
- MASL All-League Third Team: 2015
- MASL All-League Honorable Mention: 2019, 2021
- MASL All-Time Saves Leader: Surpassed the previous record with his 1,934th save on December 30, 2023.
- All-PASL: 2013–14.
- MASL: Elite 6 team
