= Jordyn Brooks =

American football player (born 1997)

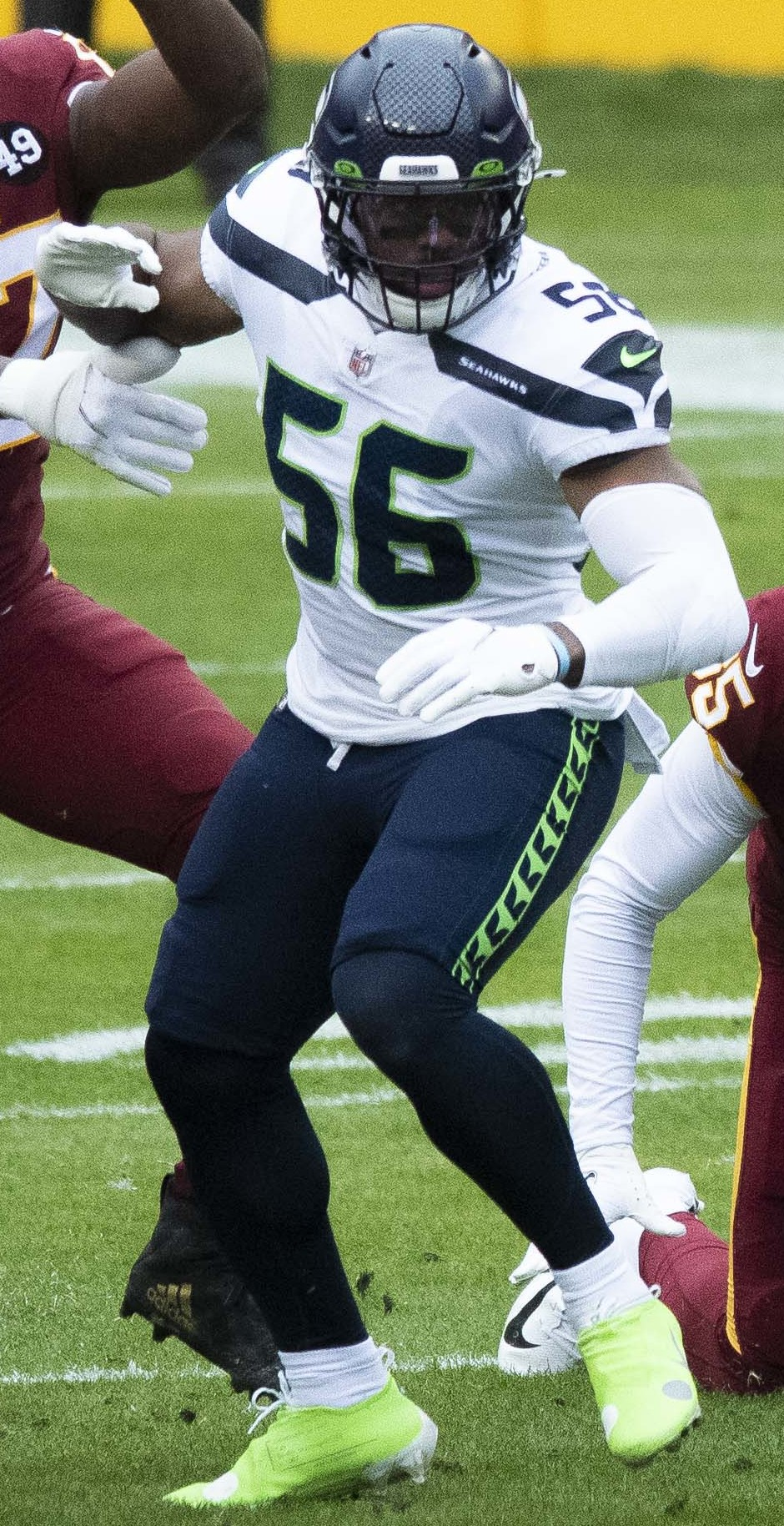
- Brooks with the Seattle Seahawks in 2020

No. 20 – Miami Dolphins
- Position: Linebacker
- Roster status: Active

Personal information
- Born: October 21, 1997 (age 29); Dallas, Texas, U.S.
- Listed height: 6 ft 0 in (1.83 m)
- Listed weight: 240 lb (109 kg)

Career information
- High school: Stratford (Houston, Texas)
- College: Texas Tech (2016–2019)
- NFL draft: 2020: 1st round, 27th overall pick

Career history
- Seattle Seahawks (2020–2023); Miami Dolphins (2024–present)

Awards and highlights
- First-team All-Pro (2025); 2× NFL solo tackles leader (2021, 2025); NFL combined tackles leader (2025); Second team All-American (2019); First team All-Big 12 (2019)

Career NFL statistics as of Week 10, 2026
- Total tackles: 923
- Sacks: 13.0
- Forced fumbles: 4
- Fumble recoveries: 6
- Pass deflections: 27
- Interceptions: 1
- Defensive touchdowns: 1
- Stats at Pro Football Reference

Jordyn W. Brooks (born October 21, 1997) is an American professional football linebacker for the Miami Dolphins of the National Football League (NFL). He played college football for the Texas Tech Red Raiders and was selected by the Seattle Seahawks in the first round of the 2020 NFL draft.

== Early life ==
Brooks was born in Dallas, Texas, and later moved to Houston, Texas, where he grew up. He attended Stratford High School. Brooks was named All-District 19-5A in his junior and senior seasons. Brooks committed to play college football at Texas Tech University over offers from Arkansas, Houston, Missouri and Washington.

== College career ==
Brooks was named a freshman All-American by 24/7 Sports and honorable mention All-Big 12 Conference after leading Texas Tech with 86 tackles (five for loss) with four passes broken up and a forced fumble. As a sophomore he finished third on the team in tackles with 89 (0.5 for loss) with an interception and two passes broken up and was again named honorable mention All-Big 12. Brooks was named honorable mention All-Big 12 for a third straight season after leading the Red Raiders with 84 tackles and with 7.5 tackles for loss with three sacks and an interception.

Going to his senior season, Brooks was named to the Butkus Award watch list and was named the top inside linebacker prospect for the 2020 NFL Draft by ESPN analyst Mel Kiper. He made 19 tackles with three sacks in an upset win over #21 Oklahoma State on October 5, 2019, and was named the Big 12 Defensive Player of the Week and the national defensive player of the week by the Football Writers Association of America and the Walter Camp Football Foundation (WCFF). Brooks was named first-team All-Big 12 and a consensus second-team All-American selection after recording 108 tackles, including 20 tackles for loss and three sacks. Brooks finished his collegiate career with 367 tackles (seventh-most in school history), 33 tackles for loss and seven sacks with two interceptions, two forced fumbles and three fumbles recovered.

== Professional career ==
Pre-draft measurables
Height	Weight	Arm length	Hand span	Wingspan	40-yard dash	10-yard split	20-yard split	Wonderlic
6 ft 0 in (1.83 m)	240 lb (109 kg)	32 7/8 in (0.84 m)	9 1/8 in (0.23 m)	6 ft 7 3/8 in (2.02 m)	4.54 s	1.53 s	2.67 s	10
All values from NFL Combine

=== Seattle Seahawks ===
==== 2020 ====
Brooks was selected by the Seattle Seahawks in the first round with the 27th overall pick in the 2020 NFL draft.

Brooks was named as the backup weakside linebacker to starter K. J. Wright to begin the season. Brooks ended up playing seven snaps in the team's Week 1 game against the Atlanta Falcons where he recorded his first career NFL tackle. Following the season-ending injury Bruce Irvin suffered after the team's Week 2 victory over the New England Patriots, the team announced that Brooks would replace Irvin as the starter. In a Week 13 game against the New York Giants, Brooks recorded 4 solo tackles and 6 assists, the most he had all season. He was the co-leader in tackles that game, with Jamal Adams also finishing with 10. In a Week 16 game against the Los Angeles Rams, Brooks recorded 7 solo tackles and 1 assist, leading the team with Adams and D. J. Reed. He ended his rookie season with a total of 57 total tackles, and 2 pass deflections.

==== 2021 ====
Brooks broke the Seahawks franchise record for most tackles in a season with 184 combined tackles.

==== 2022 ====
Following the Seahawks' 23–6 victory over the New York Jets in Week 17 of the 2022 season, it was announced that Brooks had suffered a torn ACL and was placed on injured reserve. He finished the season with a team-high 161 tackles, one sack, five passes defensed, and a forced fumble.

=== Miami Dolphins ===
On March 14, 2024, Brooks signed a three-year, $26.3 million contract with the Miami Dolphins. He started all 17 games in 2024, recording a team-leading 143 tackles, three sacks, and six passes defensed.

In Week 8 of the 2025 season, Brooks recorded 10 tackles, three tackles for loss and a sack in a 34-10 win over the Atlanta Falcons, earning AFC Defensive Player of the Week. In Week 11, Brooks recorded 20 tackles in a 16-13 win over the Commanders, earning his second AFC Defensive Player of the Week of the season. Brooks ended the 2025 season with a league leading 183 tackles (99 solo). Brooks also became the fifth player since 2000 to reach 800 tackles in his first six NFL seasons, joining Roquan Smith, Patrick Willis, Luke Kuechly, and Foyesade Oluokun.

On July 22, 2026, Brooks signed a three-year, $51.3 million extension, keeping him with the Dolphins through the 2029 season.

== Career statistics ==
Legend
	Led the league
**Bold**	Career high

=== NFL ===
==== Regular season ====
Year	Team	Games		Tackles					Interceptions						Fumbles				
Year	Team	GP	GS	Cmb	Solo	Ast	Sck	TFL	Int	Yds	Avg	Lng	TD	PD	FF	Fum	FR	Yds	TD
2020	SEA	14	6	57	35	22	0.0	2	0	0	0.0	0	0	2	0	0	0	0	0
2021	SEA	17	17	**184**	**109**	75	1.0	10	0	0	0.0	0	0	5	0	0	1	5	0
2022	SEA	16	16	161	103	58	1.0	3	0	0	0.0	0	0	5	**1**	0	1	3	0
2023	SEA	16	16	111	62	49	**4.5**	8	**1**	**12**	**12.0**	**12**	**1**	4	**1**	0	1	8	0
2024	MIA	17	17	143	86	57	3.0	11	0	0	0.0	0	0	**6**	0	0	**2**	**23**	0
2025	MIA	17	17	183	99	**84**	3.5	**13**	0	0	0.0	0	0	3	**1**	0	1	2	0
2026	MIA	9	9	84	38	46	0.0	4	0	0	0.0	0	0	2	1	0	0	0	0
Career		106	98	923	532	391	13.0	51	1	12	12.0	12	1	27	4	0	6	41	0

==== Postseason ====
Year	Team	Games		Tackles					Interceptions						Fumbles				
Year	Team	GP	GS	Cmb	Solo	Ast	Sck	TFL	Int	Yds	Avg	Lng	TD	PD	FF	Fum	FR	Yds	TD
2020	SEA	1	1	8	5	3	0.0	0	0	0	0.0	0	0	0	0	0	0	0	0
Career		1	1	8	5	3	0.0	0	0	0	0.0	0	0	0	0	0	0	0	0

=== College ===
Year	Team	GP	Tackles					Interceptions					Fumbles			
Year	Team	GP	Cmb	Solo	Ast	Sck	TFL	Int	Yds	Avg	TD	PD	FF	FR	Yds	TD
2016	Texas Tech	12	86	61	25	1.0	5.0	0	0	—	0	**4**	**1**	0	0	0
2017	Texas Tech	12	89	50	39	0.0	0.5	**1**	2	2.0	0	2	0	1	-2	0
2018	Texas Tech	12	84	43	41	**3.0**	7.5	**1**	**3**	**3.0**	0	1	0	0	0	0
2019	Texas Tech	11	**108**	**66**	**42**	**3.0**	**20.0**	0	0	—	0	0	**1**	**2**	**19**	0
Career		47	367	220	147	7.0	33.0	2	5	2.5	0	7	2	3	17	0

== Personal life ==
In November 2022, he helped distribute 10,000 cans of soup with Campbell's Chunky.
