= Chris Edmonds (safety) =

American football player (born 2001)

St. Louis Battlehawks
- Position: Safety
- Roster status: Unsigned draft pick

Personal information
- Born: July 16, 2001 (age 25); Phenix City, Alabama, U.S.
- Listed height: 6 ft 2 in (1.88 m)
- Listed weight: 210 lb (95 kg)

Career information
- High school: Brookstone School (Columbus, Georgia)
- College: Samford (2019–2021); Arizona State (2022–2023)
- NFL draft: 2024: undrafted

Career history
- Cleveland Browns (2024–2025); St. Louis Battlehawks (2027-present)

Career NFL statistics as of 2025
- Total tackles: 7
- Stats at Pro Football Reference

Chris Edmonds (born July 16, 2001) is an American professional football safety. He played college football for the Arizona State Sun Devils and Samford Bulldogs.

== College career ==
=== Samford ===
During Edmonds three-year career at Samford from 2019 to 2021, he appeared in 28 games, where he notched 83 tackles, a sack, eight interceptions, and a touchdown. After the conclusion of the 2021 season, Edmonds decided to enter his name into the NCAA transfer portal.

=== Arizona State ===
Edmonds decided to transfer to play for the Arizona State Sun Devils. During Edmonds two-year career at Arizona State from 2022 to 2023, he played in 24 games, where he totaled 121 tackles with one being for a loss, three interceptions, and five pass deflections. After the 2023 season, Edmonds declared for the 2024 NFL draft.

== Professional career ==
Pre-draft measurables
Height	Weight	Arm length	Hand span	Wingspan	40-yard dash	10-yard split	20-yard split	20-yard shuttle	Three-cone drill	Vertical jump	Broad jump	Bench press
6 ft 2 3/8 in (1.89 m)	210 lb (95 kg)	30 3/4 in (0.78 m)	8 3/4 in (0.22 m)	6 ft 2 3/4 in (1.90 m)	4.49 s	1.61 s	2.62 s	4.29 s	7.14 s	32.0 in (0.81 m)	9 ft 8 in (2.95 m)	9 reps
All values from Pro Day

After not being selected in the 2024 NFL draft, Edmonds signed with the Cleveland Browns as an undrafted free agent. On August 27, 2024, Edmonds was released during final roster cuts but signed back to the team's practice squad the following day. On October 12, 2024, Edmonds was elevated to the Browns active roster ahead of their week six matchup versus the Philadelphia Eagles.

On August 26, 2025, Edmonds was waived by the Browns as part of final roster cuts and re-signed to the practice squad the next day. He was promoted to the active roster on November 8. On December 10, Edmonds was waived and re-signed to the practice squad the next day. He was promoted back to the active roster on December 20.

On August 28, 2026, Edmonds was waived by the Browns.
