= Bobby Wagner =

American football player (born 1990)

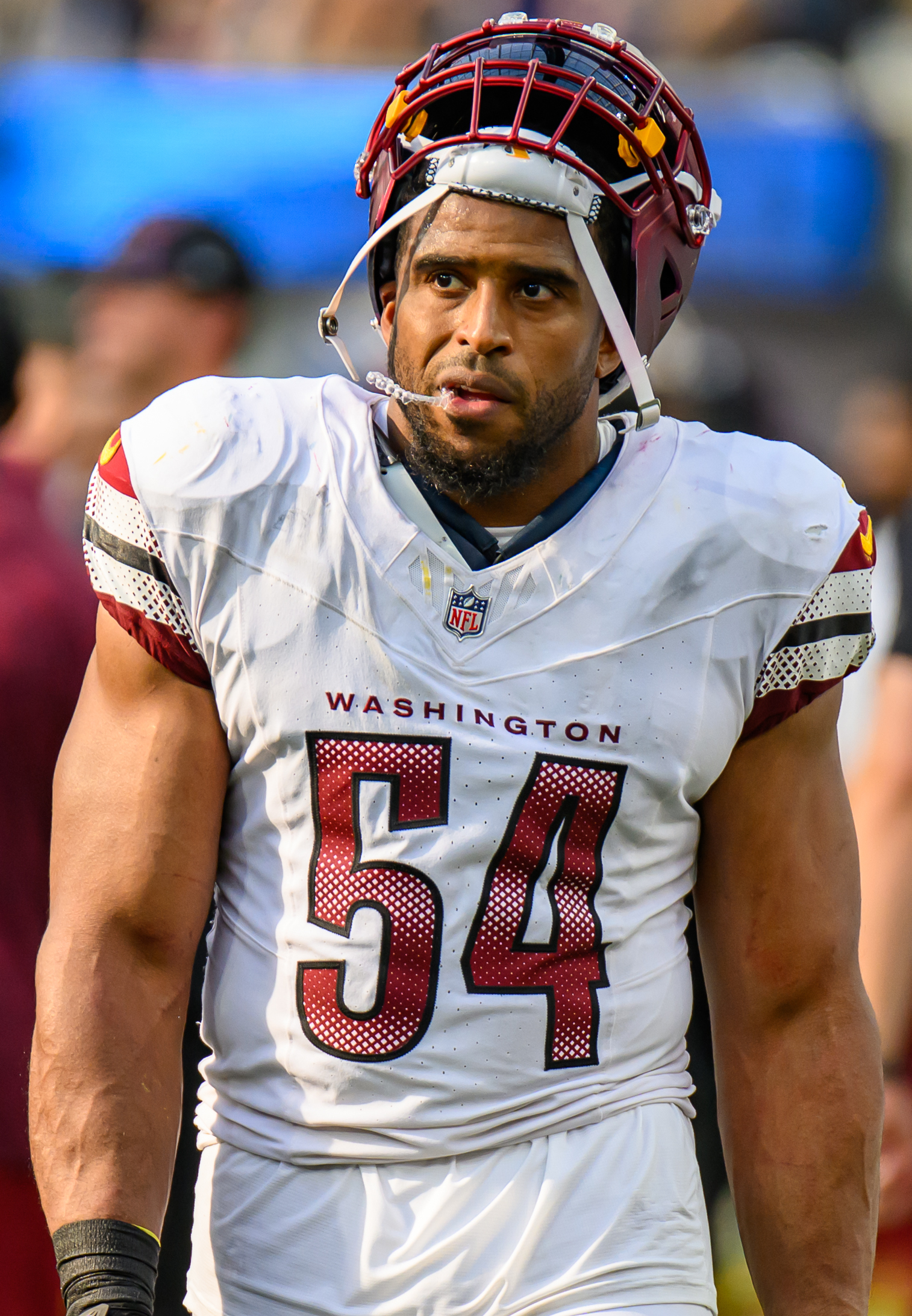
- Wagner with the Washington Commanders in 2025

Profile
- Position: Linebacker

Personal information
- Born: June 27, 1990 (age 36); Los Angeles, California, U.S.
- Listed height: 6 ft 0 in (1.83 m)
- Listed weight: 242 lb (110 kg)

Career information
- High school: Colony (Ontario, California)
- College: Utah State (2008–2011)
- NFL draft: 2012: 2nd round, 47th overall pick

Career history
- Seattle Seahawks (2012–2021); Los Angeles Rams (2022); Seattle Seahawks (2023); Washington Commanders (2024–2025)

Awards and highlights
- Super Bowl champion (XLVIII); Walter Payton NFL Man of the Year (2025); 6× First-team All-Pro (2014, 2016–2020); 5× Second-team All-Pro (2015, 2021–2024); 10× Pro Bowl (2014–2021, 2023, 2024); 3× NFL combined tackles leader (2016, 2019, 2023); NFL solo tackles co-leader (2017); NFL 2010s All-Decade Team; Seattle Seahawks Top 50 players; PFWA All-Rookie Team (2012); WAC Defensive Player of the Year (2011); 3× First-team All-WAC (2009–2011); Senior Bowl MVP (2012); NFL records: Most career assisted tackles: 850

Career NFL statistics as of 2025
- Tackles: 2,000
- Sacks: 39.5
- Pass deflections: 76
- Interceptions: 15
- Forced fumbles: 7
- Fumble recoveries: 12
- Defensive touchdowns: 4
- Stats at Pro Football Reference

Bobby Joseph Wagner (born June 27, 1990) is an American professional football linebacker. Wagner played college football for the Utah State Aggies and was selected by the Seattle Seahawks in the second round of the 2012 NFL draft. He spent ten years with the Seahawks before playing for the Los Angeles Rams in 2022, later returning to Seattle for a second stint in 2023. He then spent two seasons playing for the Washington Commanders.

Regarded as one of the greatest linebackers of his era, Wagner is a member of the NFL 2010s All-Decade Team and won Super Bowl XLVIII with the Seahawks in 2013. He is also a ten-time Pro Bowler, an eleven-time All-Pro selection, a three-time NFL combined tackles leader, and leads all active players in career tackles. Wagner won the 2023 Art Rooney Award and was named the 2025 Walter Payton NFL Man of the Year. He is also a minority owner of the WNBA's Seattle Storm.

== Early life ==
Wagner was born on June 27, 1990, in Los Angeles, California. He attended Colony High School in Ontario, California, where he played high school football for the Titans. In 2007, he registered 125 tackles (92 solo, 33 assists), including four sacks as a senior. He also played tight end, tallying 37 catches for 595 yards with 11 touchdowns. He received all-CIF Central Division honors as well as all-Mount Baldy League accolades. He earned second-team California Division 2 all-state honors after helping lead the Titans to a CIF division title and was named to the All-San Bernardino County team. Considered a two-star recruit by Rivals.com, Wagner's only offer came from Utah State.

== College career ==
Wagner attended Utah State University from 2008 to 2011. A four-year starter, he recorded 445 tackles, 4.5 sacks, and four interceptions during his career. As a senior in 2011, Wagner was the WAC Defensive Player of the Year after recording 147 tackles, four sacks, and two interceptions.

== Professional career ==
On January 14, 2012, it was announced that Wagner had accepted his invitation to play in the 2012 Senior Bowl. He became the first Utah State player to play in the game since Chris Cooley in 2004. On January 28, 2012, Wagner played in the Senior Bowl and recorded 22 combined tackles and an interception for the North team coached by Leslie Frazier that defeated the South team 23–13. He was named the Senior Bowl MVP and was also named the North's Most Outstanding Player. Wagner received an invitation to the NFL Scouting Combine, but was unable to attend after coming down with pneumonia. On March 30, 2012, Wagner attended Utah State's Pro Day and impressed scouts and team representatives after performing all of the combine drills. He displayed his versatility and athleticism throughout his workout and helped solidify himself as a top linebacker. His 40-yard dash and broad jump would have finished first among all linebackers in at the NFL combine and his vertical would have tied with California's Mychal Kendricks for first. His broad jump was five inches better than any linebacker at the combine and would have finished third among all positions. At the conclusion of the pre-draft process, Wagner was projected to be a second round pick by NFL draft experts and scouts. He was ranked the fourth best outside linebacker in the draft by NFLDraftScout.com.

Pre-draft measurables
Height	Weight	Arm length	Hand span	40-yard dash	10-yard split	20-yard split	20-yard shuttle	Three-cone drill	Vertical jump	Broad jump	Bench press
6 ft 0 3/8 in (1.84 m)	241 lb (109 kg)	33 in (0.84 m)	9 1/2 in (0.24 m)	4.46 s	1.57 s	2.64 s	4.28 s	7.10 s	39.5 in (1.00 m)	11 ft 0 in (3.35 m)	24 reps
All values from Utah State's Pro Day

=== Seattle Seahawks (first stint) ===
==== 2012 ====
The Seattle Seahawks selected Wagner in the second round (47th overall) of the 2012 NFL draft. He is the 11th highest player selected in the NFL draft from Utah State and the highest since Rulon Jones in 1980. The Seahawks also drafted his Utah State teammate Robert Turbin in the fourth round. On May 7, 2012, the Seahawks signed Wagner to a four-year, $4.30 million contract that includes $2.51 million guaranteed and a signing bonus of $1.57 million.

Wagner entered training camp competing for the vacant starting middle linebacker role against Barrett Ruud and Matt McCoy. Although Ruud was initially supposed to replace David Hawthorne, an injury sidelined him during organized team activities, giving Wagner valuable time with the first team defense. Head coach Pete Carroll named Wagner the starting middle linebacker, along with outside linebackers K. J. Wright and Leroy Hill, to start the regular season.

He made his professional regular season debut and first career start in the Seahawks season-opener at the Arizona Cardinals and recorded four combined tackles during their 20–16 loss. In Week 5, Wagner recorded five combined tackles and made his first career sack on Cam Newton in the Seahawks' 16–12 victory. The next week, he made a season-high 14 combined tackles in a 24–23 victory against the New England Patriots. On November 25, 2012, Wagner recorded nine combined tackles, two pass deflections, and intercepted his first career pass off Miami Dolphins quarterback Ryan Tannehill during a 24–21 loss. On December 9, 2012, he collected eight combined tackles, two pass deflections, and intercepted two passes off of John Skelton in a 58–0 routing against the Arizona Cardinals. Wagner finished his rookie season with 140 combined tackles (87 solo), four pass deflections, three interceptions. and two sacks in 16 games and 15 starts. Pro Football Focus (PFF) ranked him the second best inside linebacker in 2012 and the best rookie linebacker during the season. He was named to the PFWA All-Rookie Team.

The Seahawks finished second in the NFC West with an 11–5 record and received a playoff berth. On January 6, 2013, Wagner started in his first career playoff game and recorded nine combined tackles during a 24–14 victory at the Washington Redskins in the National Football Conference (NFC) Wild Card Round. They were eliminated by the Atlanta Falcons in the Divisional Round.

==== 2013: Super Bowl championship ====
Wagner remained the starting middle linebacker to start the 2013 regular season under new defensive coordinator Dan Quinn. On September 22, 2013, he recorded nine combined tackles, deflected a pass, and intercepted Chad Henne as the Seahawks defeated the Jacksonville Jaguars and Seattle's former defensive coordinator Gus Bradley 45–17, who became the Jaguars head coach in 2013. Wagner missed the first two games of his career (Weeks 6–7) after suffering a high ankle sprain. In Week 9, Wagner collected 11 combined tackles and was credited with 1.5 sacks on Mike Glennon during a 27–24 win over the Tampa Bay Buccaneers. On December 29, 2013, he made a season-high 12 combined tackles during a 27–9 victory against the St. Louis Rams. He finished the season with 120 combined tackles (72 solo), seven pass deflections, five sacks, and two interceptions in 14 games and 14 starts. PFF ranked Wagner the 61st best player in the league in 2013, regardless of position.

The Seahawks finished the season atop their division with a 13–3 record. On January 19, 2014, Wagner started in the NFC Championship and recorded 15 combined tackles during a 23–17 victory over the San Francisco 49ers. On February 2, 2014, Wagner started in his first career Super Bowl and made ten combined tackles as the Seahawks routed the Denver Broncos 43–8 and won Super Bowl XLVIII.

==== 2014 ====
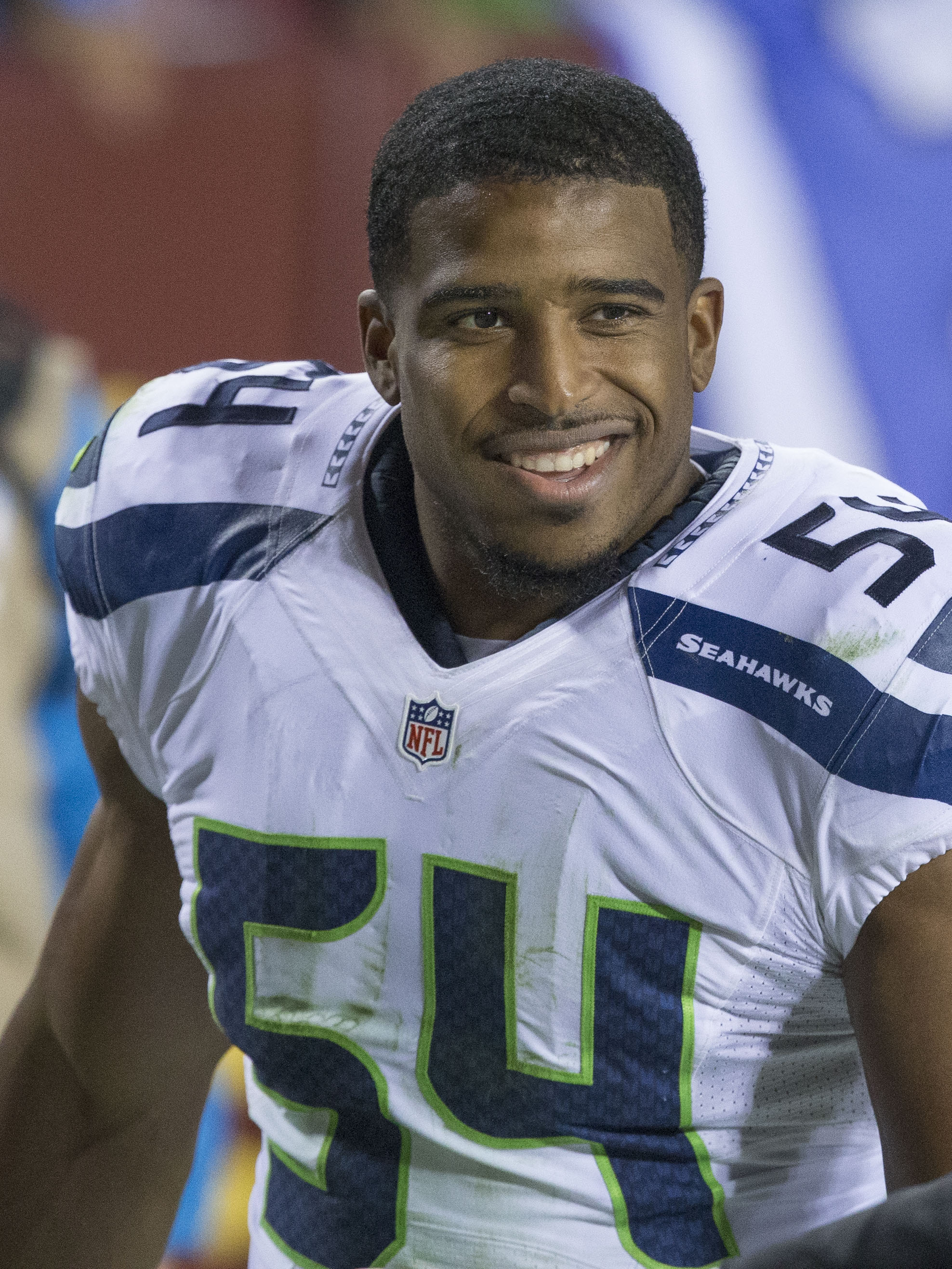
Wagner with the Seattle Seahawks in 2014

Wagner, K. J. Wright, and Bruce Irvin returned as the starting linebacker corps in 2014. Wagner started the Seahawks' season-opener against the Green Bay Packers and recorded a season-high 14 combined tackles during a 36–16 victory on Thursday Night Football. Unfortunately, he missed five games (Weeks 7–11) after suffering turf toe. On December 14, 2014, Wagner recorded his fourth game with at least ten combined tackles and sacked Colin Kaepernick during a 17–7 victory over the 49ers. Wagner finished the 2014 season with 104 combined tackles (67 solo), nine tackles for a loss, three pass deflections, and two sacks in 11 games and 11 starts. Even though he missed five games, he was voted into his first Pro Bowl and was named First Team All-Pro. For the third straight season, the Seahawks' defense finished first in the NFL in points allowed, making Wagner a key starter on the top defense every year of his career so far. For his efforts that season, he received a single MVP vote from Tony Dungy, largely due to the Seahawks allowing 20.4 points per game without Wagner and 6.5 points per game in the six games after he returned from an injury.

On February 1, 2015, the Seahawks played in Super Bowl XLIX after defeating the Panthers in the Divisional Round and then the Packers in the NFC Championship. Wagner recorded 12 combined tackles, deflected a pass, and intercepted a pass attempt by Tom Brady in the Seahawks 28–24 last-second loss to the Patriots. Wagner made the NFL Top 100 Players for the first time in his career after he garnered enough votes from his NFL peers to finish ranked 69th in the NFL Top 100 Players of 2015.

==== 2015 ====
On August 2, 2015, the Seahawks signed Wagner to a four-year, $43 million contract extension that included $19.97 million guaranteed and a signing bonus of $8 million.

Irvin, Wright, and Wagner remained the starters under new defensive coordinator Kris Richard to begin 2015. On October 11, 2015, Wagner recorded seven combined tackles, a pass deflection and a fumble recovery, and scored his first career touchdown during a 27–24 overtime loss to the Cincinnati Bengals. Defensive end Michael Bennett caused Bengals' running back Rex Burkhead to fumble in the third quarter, which Wagner recovered and returned it 23 yards for a touchdown. Wagner missed the Seahawks' Week 6 loss to the Carolina Panthers with a pectoral strain. In Week 10, Wagner collected 11 combined tackles, deflected a pass, recovered a fumble, and scored his second touchdown of the season, as the Seahawks lost to the Arizona Cardinals, 39–32. In the fourth quarter of that game, linebacker K. J. Wright sacked quarterback Carson Palmer for a nine-yard loss and jarred the ball loose resulting in a fumble. Wagner recovered the fumble and returned it for a 22-yard touchdown. On November 29, 2015, he tied his season-high of 12 combined tackles and deflected a pass in Seattle's 39–30 victory over the Pittsburgh Steelers.

He finished the 2015 season with 114 combined tackles (67 solo) and seven pass deflections, and was credited with only half a sack in 15 games and 15 starts. This marked his first and only season without a solo sack. Wagner finished second on the team in tackles, falling two behind leader K. J. Wright. He was voted to the 2016 Pro Bowl and was named to the Associated Press All-Pro second team. PFF ranked Wagner the 30th-best linebacker in 2015. His teammate K. J. Wright was ranked the sixth-best linebacker by PFF and Bruce Irvin was ranked 15th.

The Seahawks finished second in the NFC West with a 10–6 record. They went on to defeat the Vikings, 10–9, in the NFC Wild Card Round and then lost, 31–24, to the Panthers in the Divisional Round as Wagner recorded 13 combined tackles. On January 31, 2016, Wagner played in his first Pro Bowl game and recorded ten combined tackles to help Team Irvin defeat Team Rice, 49–27, and win the 2016 Pro Bowl.

==== 2016 ====
Wagner and Wright returned to their respective starting roles in 2016 and were joined by Mike Morgan, who was chosen to replace Bruce Irvin following his departure in free agency to the Oakland Raiders.

On September 25, 2016, Wagner recorded six combined, two pass deflections, and intercepted a pass by Blaine Gabbert during a 37–18 victory over the 49ers. In Week 9, Wagner made a career-high 16 combined tackles in Seattle's 31–25 win against the Buffalo Bills. During a Week 16 matchup against the Cardinals, he set the single-season franchise record in combined tackles after he surpassed Terry Beeson's record of 153 tackles. On January 1, 2017, Wright recorded 12 combined tackles, a pass deflection, and sacked Colin Kaepernick twice in a 25–23 victory at the San Francisco 49ers. Wagner finished the 2016 season as the Seahawks' leading tackler for the third consecutive season with a career-high 167 combined tackles (85 solo), 4.5 sacks, three pass deflections, and an interception in 16 games and 16 starts. He led the NFL in tackles, was named to his third consecutive Pro Bowl, and was voted First-team All-Pro. The Seahawks finished with a 10–5–1 record and won the NFC West. In the Wild Card Round against the Detroit Lions, he had ten total tackles in the 26–6 victory. In the Divisional Round loss to the Falcons, he had eight combined tackles. He was ranked 39th by his peers on the NFL Top 100 Players of 2017. PFF gave Wagner an overall grade of 90.8 in 2016, finishing third among linebackers behind Jerrell Freeman (93.9) and Luke Kuechly (93.1).

==== 2017 ====
On September 17, 2017, he recorded seven combined tackles, deflected two passes, and made his first interception of the season off of a pass by Brian Hoyer during a 12–9 win over the 49ers. On November 5, 2017, Wagner recorded a season-high 12 combined tackles, deflected a pass, and sacked Redskins' quarterback Kirk Cousins for the first safety of his career in the Seahawks' 17–14 loss. He finished the 2017 season with 133 combined tackles (97 solo), six pass deflections, two interceptions, 1.5 sacks, and a safety in 16 games and 16 starts. On December 19, 2017, Wagner was named to his fourth straight Pro Bowl. The Seahawks finished second in the NFC West with a 9–7 record and for that did not qualify for the playoffs for the first time during Wagner's time with the team. PFF gave Wagner an overall grade of 96.7 which was ranked the best grade among all linebackers. He earned First Team All-Pro and Pro Bowl nominations for the 2017 season. He was ranked No. 21 by his fellow players on the NFL Top 100 Players of 2018.

Wagner was the recipient of the 2017 Steve Largent Award, which is given annually to the team contributor best exemplifying the spirit, dedication, and integrity of former Seahawk wide receiver Steve Largent.

==== 2018 ====
On December 2, Wagner logged 12 combined tackles, one sack, two tackles for loss, and two takeaways near the goal line in a 43–16 home win over the 49ers. For his first takeaway, in the second quarter, he forced a fumble from Jeffery Wilson at the Seahawk 5-yard line, recovered it at the 3, and returned it 11 yards to the 14. Later, in the fourth quarter, he intercepted a pass from Nick Mullens at the 2-yard line and ran it back 98 yards for a touchdown, his first career pick six, to set the Seahawk franchise record for longest play. He earned NFC Defensive Player of the Week honors for his game against San Francisco. On December 10, against the Minnesota Vikings, Wagner was a part of many key third and fourth down stops as well as blocking a field goal by kicker Dan Bailey. The block proved to be controversial with the NFL eventually saying he should have been called for a penalty after using his teammates for leverage. In the 2018 season, Wagner had one sack, 138 total tackles (84 solo), one interception, 11 passes defended, and two forced fumbles. Wagner was named first-team All-Pro along with teammate Michael Dickson. The Seahawks finished second in the NFC West and made the playoffs as the No. 5-seed. In the Wild Card Round loss to the Dallas Cowboys, he had five total tackles. He was named to the Pro Bowl and earned First Team All-Pro. He was ranked 15th by his fellow players on the NFL Top 100 Players of 2019.

==== 2019 ====
On July 26, 2019, Wagner signed a three-year, $54 million contract extension with the Seahawks through the 2022 season with $40.2 million guaranteed, making him the highest-paid middle linebacker in the league. In Week 3 against the New Orleans Saints, Wagner recorded a team high 18 tackles in the 33–27 loss. In Week 7 against the Baltimore Ravens, Wagner recorded a team high 13 tackles in the 30–16 loss. In Week 8 against the Falcons, Wagner recorded a sack on Matt Schaub and recovered a fumble lost by Devonta Freeman in the 27–20 win. In Week 9 against the Buccaneers, Wagner recorded a team high 11 tackles and sacked Jameis Winston once in the 40–34 overtime win. In Week 15 against the Panthers, Wagner recorded his first interception of the season off a pass thrown by Kyle Allen during the 30–24 win. In Week 16 against the Cardinals, Wagner recorded a team high 13 tackles and sacked Kyler Murray once during the 27–13 loss. He led the NFL in total tackles with 159. In addition, he had three sacks, one interception, six passes defended, and one forced fumble. He was named to the Pro Bowl and earned First Team All-Pro honors for the 2019 season. He was ranked 13th by his fellow players on the NFL Top 100 Players of 2020.

==== 2020 ====
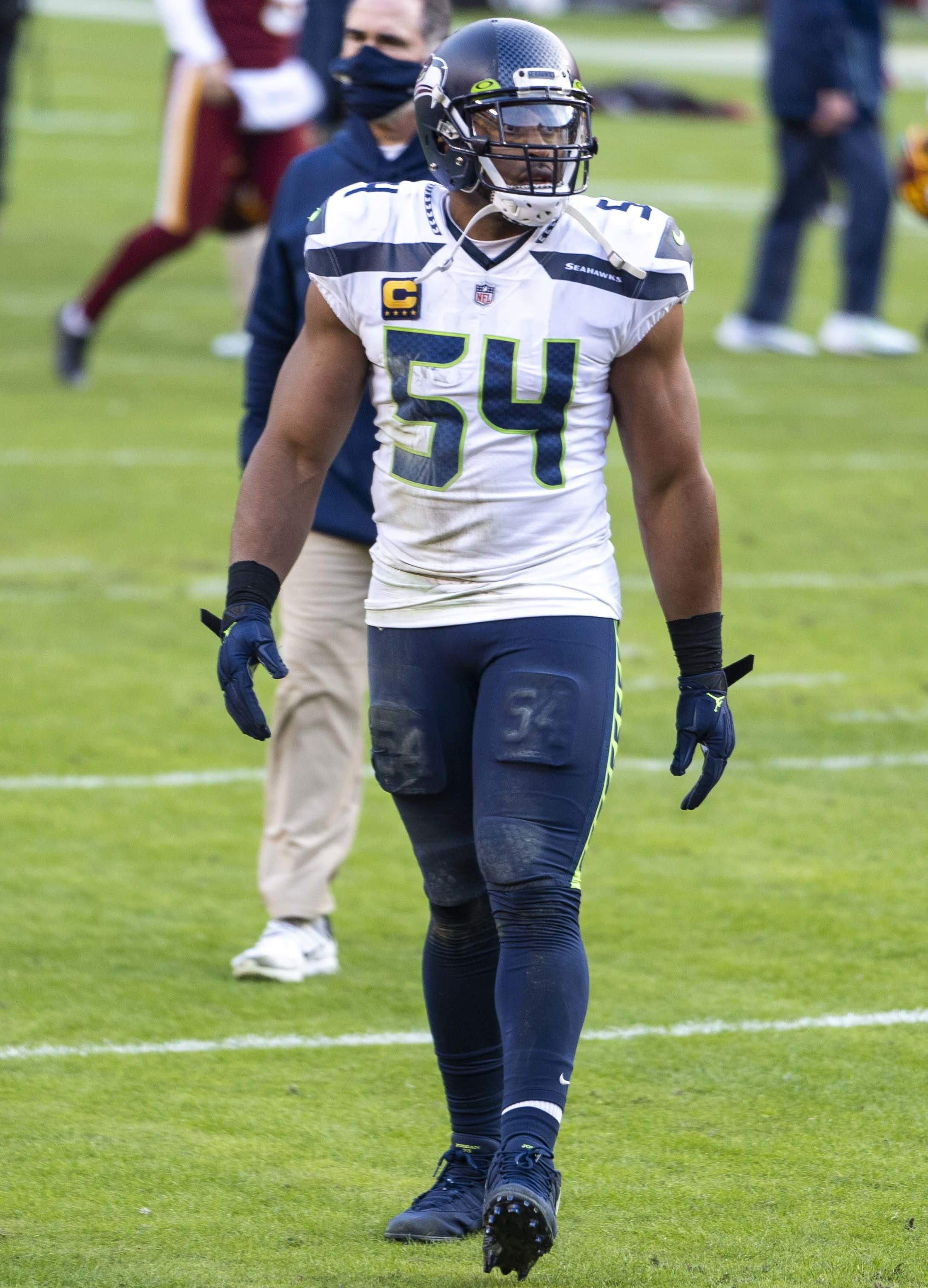
Wagner with the Seahawks in 2020

In Week 8 against the 49ers, Wagner recorded a team high 11 tackles and sacked Jimmy Garoppolo twice during the 37–27 win. On November 4, 2020, Wagner was named the NFC Defensive Player of the Week for his performance in Week 8. In the 2020 season, Wagner finished with three sacks, 138 total tackles (81 solo), eight passes defended, and one fumble recovery. He earned Pro Bowl and First Team All-Pro honors. He was ranked 25th by his fellow players on the NFL Top 100 Players of 2021. In the Wild Card Round of the playoffs against the Rams, Wagner led the team with 16 tackles (11 solo) and sacked John Wolford once during the 30–20 loss.

==== 2021 ====
In the 2021 season, Wagner finished with one sack, 170 total tackles (93 solo), one interception, five passes defended, and one forced fumble. Following the 2021 season, Wagner was named second-team All-Pro which ended his five-season streak of first-team All-Pro selections. He earned an eighth consecutive Pro Bowl nomination. He was ranked 29th by his fellow players on the NFL Top 100 Players of 2022.

On March 9, 2022, Wagner was released after 10 seasons with the Seahawks.

=== Los Angeles Rams ===
Wagner signed a five-year contract worth up to $65 million with the Los Angeles Rams on March 31, 2022. Playing and starting in all 17 games for the Rams, Wagner recorded six sacks, 140 total tackles, two interceptions, and five passes defended as L.A. fell to a 5-12 record the year after winning Super Bowl LVI. Following the 2022 season, Wagner was named second-team All-Pro for a second year in a row. He was ranked 62nd by his fellow players on the NFL Top 100 Players of 2023. The Rams released Wagner for salary cap reasons on February 23, 2023.

=== Seattle Seahawks (second stint) ===
Wagner signed a one-year contract worth up to $7 million to return to the Seahawks on March 25, 2023. He led the league in total tackles with 183 in the 2023 season. He was named as a Pro Bowler for the ninth time. In addition, he had 3.5 sacks, three passes defended, and one fumble recovery in 17 games and 16 starts. He was a second team All-Pro named by the Associated Press. He won the Art Rooney Award in 2023.

=== Washington Commanders ===
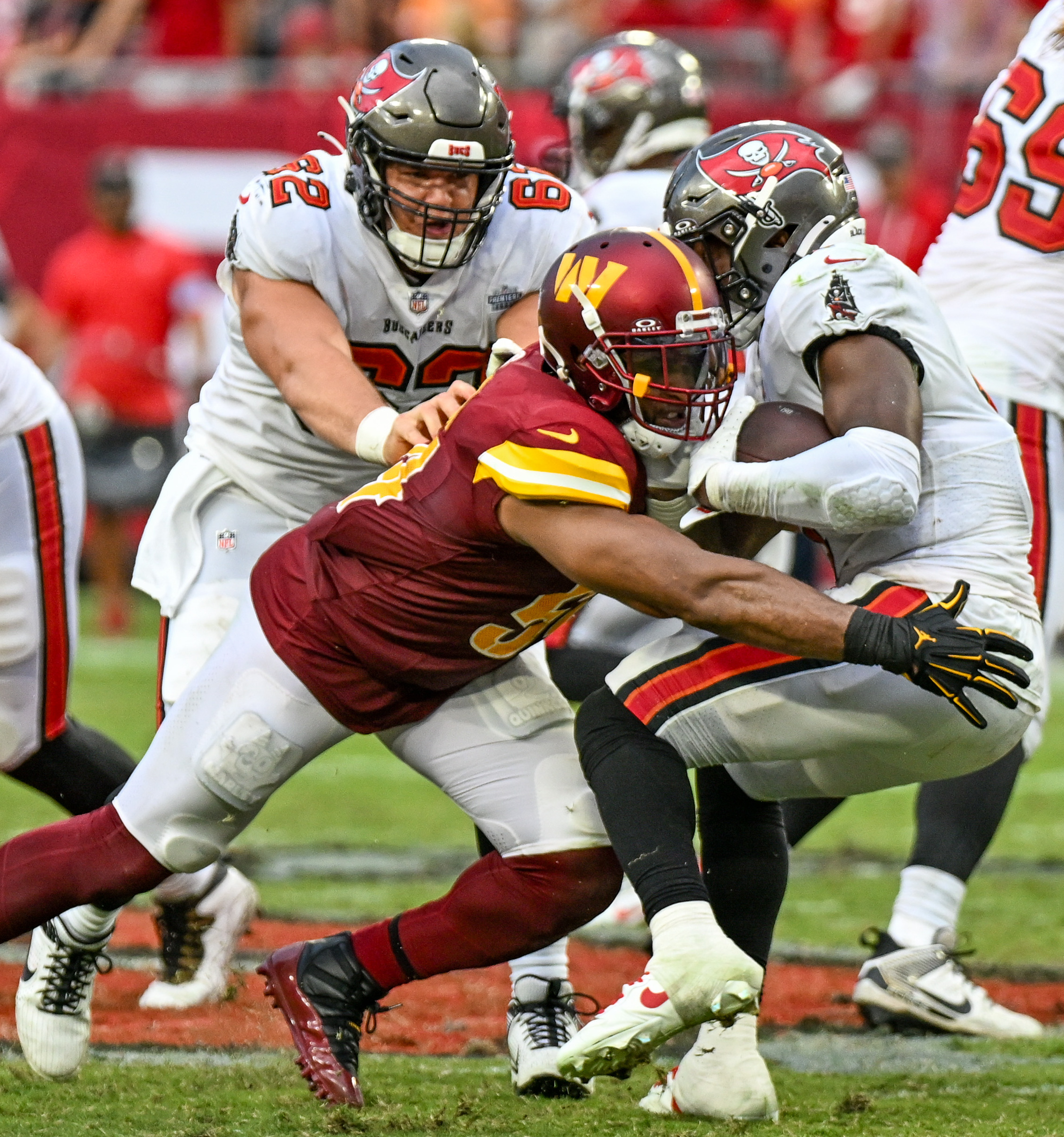
Wagner with the Washington Commanders making a tackle against the Tampa Bay Buccaneers, 2024

On March 15, 2024, Wagner signed a one-year, $8.5 million contract with the Washington Commanders. In Week 4 against the Arizona Cardinals, he surpassed Zach Thomas for fourth most career tackles in NFL history. Wagner recorded at least 100 tackles in a season for the 13th consecutive year, trailing London Fletcher for the second-longest streak in NFL history. He earned second-team All-Pro honors after recording 132 tackles, which led the team, as well as two sacks, four pass breakups, a forced fumble, and two fumble recoveries. Wagner also was named the team's nominee for the Walter Payton NFL Man of the Year Award. He was ranked 74th by his fellow players on the NFL Top 100 Players of 2025.

On March 6, 2025, Wagner signed a one-year contract extension worth $9.5 million. On January 4, 2026, during Washington's final regular season game, Wagner recorded five combined tackles to reach 2,000 combined tackles in his career, becoming the third player in NFL history to reach the mark after Ray Lewis and London Fletcher. He finished the season with 162 tackles, 4.5 sacks, four pass breakups, and two interceptions. He won the 2025 NFL Walter Payton Man of the Year. Wagner was ranked 81st by his fellow players on the NFL Top 100 Players of 2026.

== Career statistics ==
=== NFL ===
Legend
	Won the Super Bowl
	Led the league
**Bold**	Career high

==== Regular season ====
Year	Team	Games		Tackles						Interceptions						Fumbles			
Year	Team	GP	GS	Cmb	Solo	Ast	Sck	Sfty	TfL	PD	Int	Yds	Avg	Lng	TD	FF	FR	Yds	TD
2012	SEA	16	15	140	87	53	2.0	—	9	4	**3**	55	18.3	45	0	—	—	—	—
2013	SEA	14	14	120	72	48	5.0	—	4	7	2	9	4.5	9	0	—	1	0	0
2014	SEA	11	11	104	67	37	2.0	—	10	3	—	—	—	—	—	—	—	—	—
2015	SEA	15	15	114	67	47	0.5	—	2	7	—	—	—	—	—	**2**	**3**	**45**	**2**
2016	SEA	16	16	167	85	82	4.5	—	7	3	1	9	9.0	9	0	—	1	0	0
2017	SEA	16	16	133	**97**	36	1.5	**1**	**13**	6	2	7	3.5	7	0	—	1	21	1
2018	SEA	15	15	138	84	54	1.0	—	6	**11**	1	**98**	**98.0**	**98**	**1**	**2**	1	11	0
2019	SEA	16	16	159	86	73	3.0	—	7	6	1	6	6.0	6	0	1	1	5	0
2020	SEA	16	16	138	81	57	3.0	—	7	8	—	—	—	—	—	—	1	0	0
2021	SEA	16	16	170	93	77	1.0	—	3	5	1	3	3.0	3	0	1	—	—	—
2022	LAR	17	17	140	81	59	**6.0**	—	10	5	2	13	6.5	13	0	—	—	—	—
2023	SEA	17	16	**183**	96	**87**	3.5	—	11	3	—	—	—	—	—	—	1	0	0
2024	WAS	17	17	132	75	57	2.0	—	10	4	—	—	—	—	—	1	2	0	0
2025	WAS	17	17	162	79	83	4.5	—	8	4	2	7	3.5	6	—	—	—	—	—
Career		219	217	2,000	1,150	850	39.5	1	107	76	15	207	13.8	98	1	7	12	82	3

==== Postseason ====
Year	Team	Games		Tackles						Interceptions						Fumbles			
Year	Team	GP	GS	Cmb	Solo	Ast	Sck	Sfty	TfL	PD	Int	Yds	Avg	Lng	TD	FF	FR	Yds	TD
2012	SEA	2	2	17	12	5	0.0	—	**1**	**1**	**1**	**4**	**4.0**	**4**	0	—	—	—	—
2013	SEA	3	3	**34**	**17**	**17**	0.0	—	**1**	**1**	—	—	—	—	—	—	—	—	—
2014	SEA	3	3	31	16	15	0.0	—	0	**1**	**1**	0	0.0	0	0	—	—	—	—
2015	SEA	2	2	20	12	8	0.0	—	**1**	0	—	—	—	—	—	—	—	—	—
2016	SEA	2	2	18	11	7	0.0	—	**1**	0	—	—	—	—	—	—	—	—	—
2018	SEA	1	1	5	3	2	0.0	—	0	0	—	—	—	—	—	—	—	—	—
2019	SEA	2	2	12	10	2	0.0	—	**1**	**1**	—	—	—	—	—	—	—	—	—
2020	SEA	1	1	16	11	5	**1.0**	—	**1**	0	—	—	—	—	—	—	—	—	—
2024	WAS	3	3	25	12	13	0.5	—	**1**	0	—	—	—	—	—	—	**1**	0	0
Career		19	19	178	104	74	1.5	0	7	4	2	4	2.0	4	0	0	1	0	0

=== College ===
College statistics
Year	Team	GP	Tackles					Interceptions					Fumbles			
Year	Team	GP	Cmb	Solo	Ast	Sck	TFL	Int	Yds	Avg	TD	PD	FF	FR	Yds	TD
2008	Utah State	11	51	20	31	0.0	2.0	0	0	—	0	**2**	0	0	0	0
2009	Utah State	12	114	52	62	0.0	7.0	**2**	**32**	**16.0**	0	0	**1**	0	0	0
2010	Utah State	12	133	61	72	0.5	8.0	0	0	—	0	0	0	0	0	0
2011	Utah State	13	**147**	**67**	**80**	**4.0**	**11.5**	**2**	19	9.5	0	0	0	0	0	0
Career		48	445	200	245	4.5	28.5	4	51	12.8	0	2	1	0	0	0

== Awards and highlights ==
=== NFL ===
- Super Bowl champion (XLVIII)
- Walter Payton NFL Man of the Year (2025)
- 6× first-team All-Pro (2014, 2016–2020)
- 5× second-team All-Pro (2015, 2021–2024)
- 10× Pro Bowl (2014–2021, 2023, 2024)
- 3× NFL tackles leader (2016, 2019, 2023)
- 2× Steve Largent Award (2017, 2023)
- NFL 2010s All-Decade Team
- PFWA All-Rookie Team (2012)
- Art Rooney Award (2023)
- 11× NFL Top 100 — 69th (2015), 39th (2017), 21st (2018), 15th (2019), 13th (2020), 25th (2021), 29th (2022), 62nd (2023), 59th (2024), 74th (2025), 81st (2026)

=== College ===
- 3× first-team All-WAC (2009–2011)
- 2012 Senior Bowl MVP
- Utah State University Athletics Hall of Fame Induction class of 2021

=== Seahawks records ===
- Most tackles, career: 1,566
- Most solo tackles, career: 915
- Most assisted tackles, career: 651
- Most tackles for loss, career: 79
- Most tackles, rookie season: 140 (2012)
- Most solo tackles, rookie season: 87 (2012)

== Personal life ==
Wagner had a close relationship with his mother, Phenia, who passed away after complications from a stroke in 2009, Wagner's freshman year of college. Wagner started the FAST54 Phenia Mae Fund in her honor, partnering with hospitals to help stroke patients and promote stroke education.

In January 2024, Wagner began an 18-month online course from Howard University to earn a Master of Business Administration (MBA) degree. In July 2025, he became a minority owner of the Women's National Basketball Association (WNBA) team Seattle Storm.

In August 2024, Wagner purchased and opened a franchise location of the Crumbl Cookies bakery chain at The Landing shopping mall in Renton, Washington. Wagner stated that opening the Crumbl location was "one of the steps I'm looking to take to stay connected to the beautiful city of Seattle."
