= Foyesade Oluokun =

American football player (born 1995)

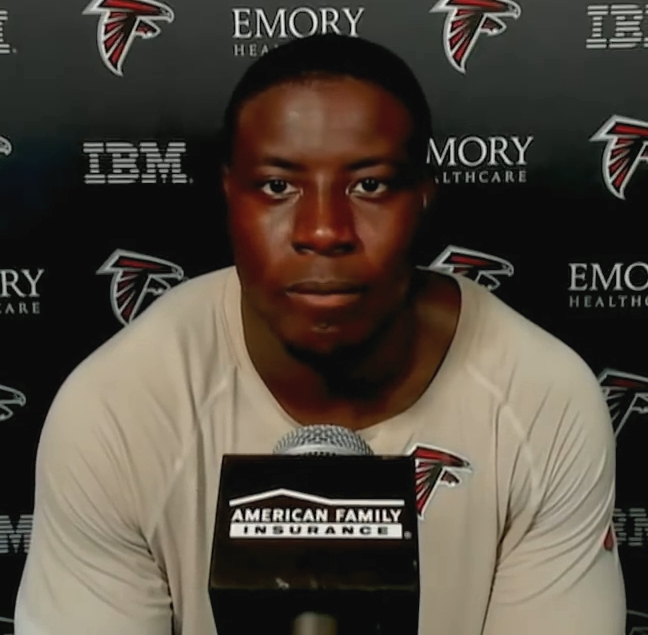
- Oluokun in 2021

No. 23 – Jacksonville Jaguars
- Position: Linebacker
- Roster status: Active

Personal information
- Born: August 2, 1995 (age 31); St. Louis, Missouri, U.S.
- Listed height: 6 ft 2 in (1.88 m)
- Listed weight: 230 lb (104 kg)

Career information
- High school: John Burroughs (Ladue, Missouri)
- College: Yale (2013–2017)
- NFL draft: 2018: 6th round, 200th overall pick

Career history
- Atlanta Falcons (2018–2021); Jacksonville Jaguars (2022–present)

Awards and highlights
- 2× NFL solo tackles leader (2022, 2023); 2× NFL combined tackles leader (2021, 2022)

Career NFL statistics as of Week 10, 2026
- Total tackles: 1,138
- Sacks: 13.5
- Forced fumbles: 13
- Fumble recoveries: 7
- Interceptions: 10
- Pass deflections: 42
- Defensive touchdowns: 1
- Stats at Pro Football Reference

Foyesade Oluokun (born August 2, 1995) is an American professional football linebacker for the Jacksonville Jaguars of the National Football League (NFL). He played college football for the Yale Bulldogs, and was selected by the Atlanta Falcons in the sixth round of the 2018 NFL draft.

== Early life ==
Oluokun attended Forsyth School, an elementary school in Clayton, Missouri, where he played basketball, soccer and other outdoor activities. He began playing football at John Burroughs School, where he was a standout on special teams with future Dallas Cowboys running back Ezekiel Elliott.

== College career ==
Oluokun played college football for Yale. He tore a pectoral muscle as a junior and was granted an extra semester. As a senior, he was a second-team all-Ivy League selection. He received a degree in economics from Yale, and declared for the 2018 NFL draft after the 2017 season. Oluokun noted that NFL front offices tend to assume that Ivy League players are a lower caliber of athletes, requiring him to work harder to prove his ability to play professionally.

== Professional career ==
=== Pre-draft ===
Oluokun did not receive an invitation to the NFL Scouting Combine. On March 8, 2018, Oluokun participated at a Pro Day held at Yale and completed all of the combine drills. Oluokun's time of 4.48 in the 40-yard dash would’ve finished sixth among linebackers at the combine and his time of 4.12 in the short shuttle would’ve been the second-best among linebackers. Oluokun attended pre-draft visits with multiple teams, including the Kansas City Chiefs, Arizona Cardinals, and Indianapolis Colts. At the conclusion of the pre-draft process, Oluokun was projected to be a seventh-round pick by the majority of NFL draft experts and scouts. He was ranked as the 20th best linebacker in the draft by DraftScout.com.

Pre-draft measurables
Height	Weight	Arm length	Hand span	Wingspan	40-yard dash	10-yard split	20-yard split	20-yard shuttle	Three-cone drill	Vertical jump	Broad jump	Bench press
6 ft 1 7/8 in (1.88 m)	229 lb (104 kg)	32 1/2 in (0.83 m)	8 3/4 in (0.22 m)	6 ft 7 in (2.01 m)	4.48 s	1.60 s	2.69 s	4.12 s	6.94 s	37 in (0.94 m)	10 ft 3 in (3.12 m)	18 reps
All values from Pro Day

=== Atlanta Falcons ===
The Atlanta Falcons selected Oluokun in the sixth round (200th overall) of the 2018 NFL draft. Oluokun was the 27th linebacker drafted in 2018. Oluokun was the 48th Yale player picked in a professional football draft and the first in the NFL draft since Shane Bannon in 2011.

External videos
- Falcons draft Foyesade Oluokun 200th overall

==== 2018 season ====
On May 9, 2018, the Falcons signed Oluokun to a four-year, $2.60 million contract with a signing bonus of $146,629.

Oluokun entered training camp slated to be a backup linebacker and special teams player. He impressed coaches with his athleticism and tackling ability during camp and began competing against Duke Riley to be the starting weakside linebacker. Head coach Dan Quinn named Oluokun a backup middle linebacker, behind Deion Jones, to begin the regular season.

He made his professional regular season debut in the Falcons' season-opener at the Philadelphia Eagles and made one tackle during their 18–12 loss. On October 7, 2018, Oluokun earned his first career start and recorded five combined tackles as the Falcons lost 41–17 at the Pittsburgh Steelers in Week 5. In Week 6, he collected a season-high ten combined tackles (seven solo) during a 34–29 victory against the Tampa Bay Buccaneers. He finished his rookie season in 2018 with 91 combined tackles (56 solo), one pass deflection, and one forced fumble in 16 games and seven starts. He received an overall grade of 64.6 from Pro Football Focus, 46th among qualifying linebackers in 2018.

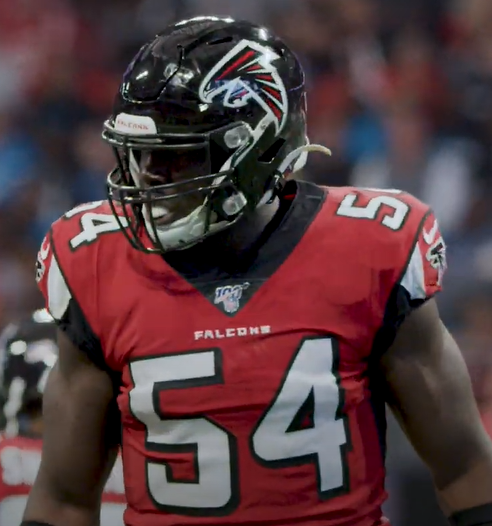
Oluokun in 2019

==== 2019 season ====
Throughout training camp, Oluokun competed against Duke Riley, Stephone Anthony, Bruce Carter, and Jermaine Grace for a role as a backup linebacker. Head coach Dan Quinn elected to have Oluokun begin the season the third linebacker on the depth chart, behind starting linebackers De'Vondre Campbell and Deion Jones. Vic Beasley acted as the third linebacker while being labeled a defensive end/edge rusher.

In Week 10, Oluokun earned his first start of the season at inside linebacker and recorded a season-high seven solo tackles (eight total) in a 26–9 win at the New Orleans Saints. On December 8, 2019, he collected a season-high 11 combined tackles (six solo) during a 40–20 victory against the Carolina Panthers. He completed his sophomore season in 2019 with 62 combined tackles (35 solo), two tackles for-a-loss, and a forced fumble in 16 games and three starts. The Atlanta Falcons finished second in the NFC South and did not qualify for a playoff berth after finishing the 2019 NFL season 7–9.

==== 2020 season ====
He entered training camp slated to takeover as a starting outside linebacker after De'Vondre Campbell departed in free agency. Head coach Dan Quinn promoted secondary coach Raheem Morris to defensive coordinator and handed over the defensive play calling duties. On August 20, 2020, the Falcons placed Oluokun on the reserve/COVID-19 list and returned after three days. Morris selected Oluokun and Deion Jones as the starting linebackers with Dante Fowler Jr. alongside as an edge rusher.

In Week 2 of the 2020 season against the Dallas Cowboys, Oluokun forced two fumbles on consecutive drives in the first quarter; both were recovered by the Falcons, who lost 40–39. In Week 6 against the Minnesota Vikings, Oluokun recorded his first career interception off a pass thrown by Kirk Cousins during the 40–23 win. In Week 9 against the Denver Broncos, Oluokun recorded 10 tackles, one pass deflection, and recorded his first career sack on Drew Lock during the 34–27 win. Oluokun was named National Football Conference (NFC) Defensive Player of the Week.

In Week 12 against the Las Vegas Raiders, Oluokun strip-sacked Derek Carr; the ball was recovered by teammate Jacob Tuioti-Mariner during the 43–6 win. In Week 16 against the Chiefs, Oluokun intercepted a pass thrown by Patrick Mahomes and made a 51-yard return during the 17–14 loss.

==== 2021 season ====
Before the season began, new head coach Arthur Smith moved Oluokun to the starting MIKE linebacker position.

In Week 3 against the New York Giants, Oluokun recorded 14 tackles in the 17–14 win. In Week 6 against the Miami Dolphins, Oluokun recorded 13 tackles and an interception in the 30–28 win. In Week 7 against the Carolina Panthers, Oluokun had a career-high 16 tackles in the 13–19 loss.

In Week 16, Oluokun had 14 tackles and intercepted Tim Boyle with less than 40 seconds left, sealing a 20–16 win over the Detroit Lions. His performance earned him NFC Defensive Player of the Week. In Week 17, Oluokun Had 13 total tackles, 2 pass deflections, and intercepted Josh Allen in the 15–29 loss to the Buffalo Bills. He led the league in tackles, the seventh-most single season tackles in NFL history.

=== Jacksonville Jaguars ===
On March 16, 2022, Oluokun signed a three-year, $45 million deal with the Jacksonville Jaguars.

Oluokun led the NFL in tackles in 2022 for the second straight year. In Week 7 of the 2023 season, he had a 24-yard interception returned for a touchdown against the Saints. In the 2023 season, he had 2.5 sacks, 173 total tackles (111 solo), one interception, six passes defended, one forced fumble, and three fumble recoveries.

On March 29, 2024, Oluokun signed a new four-year, $45 million contract, keeping him under contract with the Jaguars through the 2027 season. He finished the 2024 season with one sack, 108 total tackles (60 solo), one interception, and seven passes defended.

In Week 1 of the 2025 season, Oluokun recorded 10 tackles, a pass breakup, an interception, and a forced fumble in a 26–10 win over the Carolina Panthers, earning AFC Defensive Player of the Week. He finished the 2025 season with one sack, 143 total tackles (69 solo), one interception, 11 passes defended, two forced fumbles, and one fumble recovery.

In Week 4 of the 2026 NFL season against the Cincinnati Bengals, Oluokun posted seven tackles, an interception and forced a fumble and was named AFC Defensive Player of the Week.

== NFL career statistics ==
Legend
	Led the league
**Bold**	Career high

=== Regular season ===
Year	Team	Games		Tackles					Interceptions					Fumbles			
Year	Team	GP	GS	Cmb	Solo	Ast	TfL	Sck	PD	Int	Yds	Lng	TD	FF	FR	Yds	TD
2018	ATL	16	7	91	56	35	2	0.0	1	0	0	0	0	1	0	0	0
2019	ATL	16	3	62	36	26	2	0.0	0	0	0	0	0	1	0	0	0
2020	ATL	15	14	117	78	39	4	**3.0**	4	2	65	51	0	**4**	1	0	0
2021	ATL	17	17	**192**	102	**90**	4	2.0	6	**3**	**80**	**56**	0	1	0	0	0
2022	JAX	17	17	184	**128**	56	**12**	2.0	5	0	0	0	0	2	2	0	0
2023	JAX	17	17	173	111	62	8	2.5	6	1	24	24	**1**	1	**3**	0	0
2024	JAX	13	13	108	60	48	6	1.0	7	1	0	0	0	0	0	0	0
2025	JAX	17	17	143	69	74	5	1.0	**11**	1	0	0	0	2	1	0	0
2026	JAX	9	9	68	46	22	5	2.0	2	2	27	22	1	0	0	0	0
Career		137	114	1,138	686	452	48	13.5	42	10	196	56	1	13	7	0	0

=== Postseason ===
Year	Team	Games		Tackles					Interceptions					Fumbles			
Year	Team	GP	GS	Cmb	Solo	Ast	TfL	Sck	PD	Int	Yds	Lng	TD	FF	FR	Yds	TD
2022	JAX	2	2	**27**	**12**	**15**	0	0.0	0	0	0	0	0	0	0	0	0
2025	JAX	1	1	5	3	2	0	0.0	0	0	0	0	0	0	0	0	0
Career		3	3	32	15	17	0	0.0	0	0	0	0	0	0	0	0	0

== Personal life ==
The son of immigrants, he is of Nigerian descent.
