= Joe Nash =

American football player (born 1960)

No. 72
- Position: Defensive tackle

Personal information
- Born: October 11, 1960 (age 66); Boston, Massachusetts, U.S.
- Listed height: 6 ft 3 in (1.91 m)
- Listed weight: 278 lb (126 kg)

Career information
- High school: Boston College (Boston, Massachusetts)
- College: Boston College
- NFL draft: 1982: undrafted

Career history
- Seattle Seahawks (1982–1996)

Awards and highlights
- First-team All-Pro (1984); Pro Bowl (1984); Seattle Seahawks 35th Anniversary team; Seattle Seahawks Top 50 players

Career NFL statistics
- Sacks: 47.5
- Interceptions: 1
- Touchdowns: 2
- Stats at Pro Football Reference

Joseph Andrew Nash (born October 11, 1960) is an American former professional football player who spent his entire career as a defensive lineman for the Seattle Seahawks of the National Football League (NFL) from 1982 to 1996. Originally a nose tackle for seven seasons, Nash switched to defensive tackle in 1989. He was signed as an undrafted free agent by the Seahawks in 1982 from Boston College and went on to play in a Seahawks-record 218 career games over 15 seasons.

In 1984 he received Pro Bowl and All-Pro honors on the way to helping the Seattle Seahawks post a then team record of 12–4. He played alongside several other talented players on Seattle's defensive line, most notably Hall of Fame tackle Cortez Kennedy and All-Pro defensive end Jacob Green.
