= Ryan Plackemeier =

American football player (born 1984)

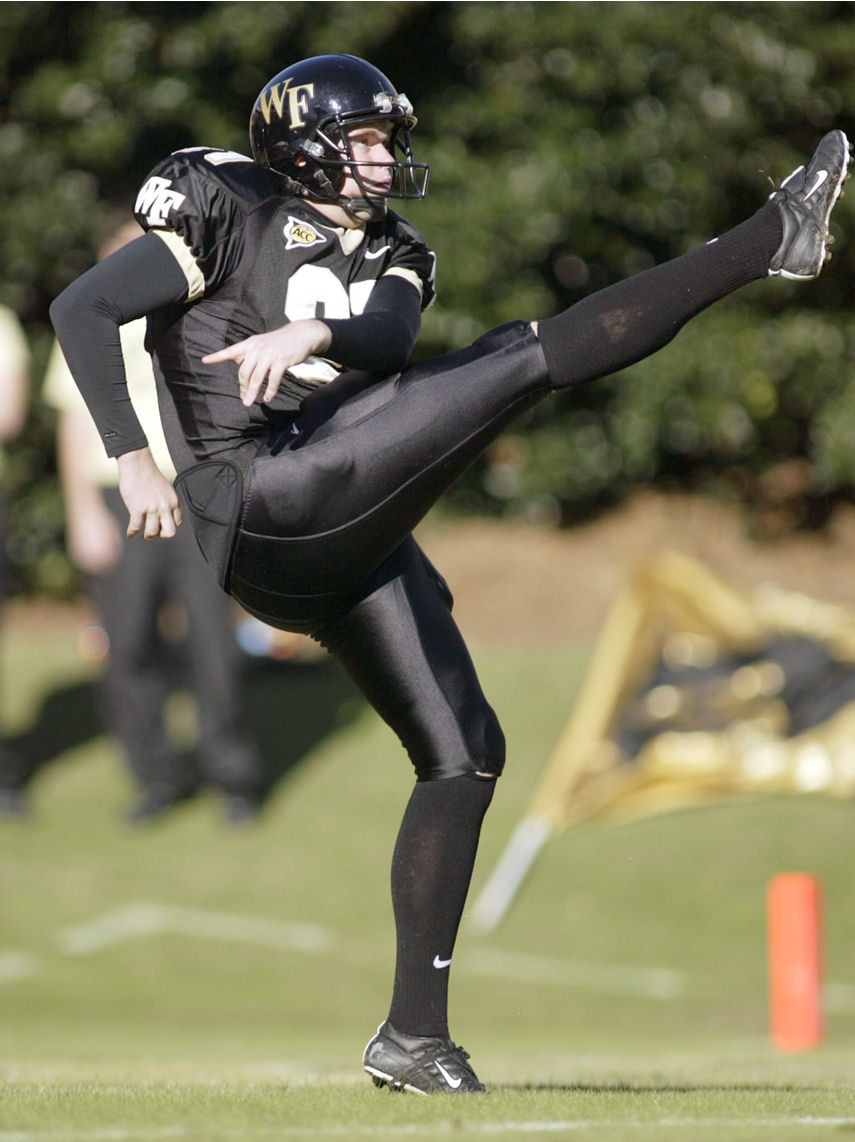
- Plackemeier with Wake Forest

No. 1
- Position: Punter

Personal information
- Born: March 5, 1984 (age 42); Colorado Springs, Colorado, U.S.
- Listed height: 6 ft 3 in (1.91 m)
- Listed weight: 252 lb (114 kg)

Career information
- High school: Fallbrook Union (Fallbrook, California)
- College: Wake Forest (2002–2005)
- NFL draft: 2006: 7th round, 239th overall pick

Career history
- Seattle Seahawks (2006–2008); Washington Redskins (2008); Cincinnati Bengals (2009)*
- * Offseason or practice squad member only

Awards and highlights
- PFWA All-Rookie Team (2006); Ray Guy Award (2005); Unanimous All-American (2005); 3× First-team All-ACC (2003–2005)

Career NFL statistics
- Punts: 236
- Punting yards: 9,955
- Punting average: 42.2
- Longest punt: 72
- Inside 20: 72
- Stats at Pro Football Reference

Ryan Steven Plackemeier (born March 5, 1984) is an American former professional football player who was a punter in the National Football League (NFL). He played college football for the Wake Forest Demon Deacons, winning the Ray Guy Award and earning unanimous All-American honors. He was selected by the Seattle Seahawks in the seventh round of the 2006 NFL draft, and also played for the Washington Redskins.

== Early life ==
Plackemeier was born in Colorado Springs, Colorado. He attended Fallbrook Union High School in Fallbrook, California, and was a letterman in soccer and football. In soccer, he was a four-year letterman and was twice recognized as his team's most valuable player. In football, as a senior, he was a first team All-Avocado League selection and was named the North County Times Kicker of the Year.

== College career ==
Plackemeier attended Wake Forest University, where he played for coach Jim Grobe's Wake Forest Demon Deacons football team from 2002 to 2005. He was a three-time first-team All-Atlantic Coast Conference (ACC) selection (2003, 2004, 2005), and a unanimous first-team All-American (2005). Following his senior season, he was presented the Ray Guy Award, given annually to the top college punter in the nation.

== Professional career ==
Pre-draft measurables
Height	Weight	Arm length	Hand span
6 ft 3 3/8 in (1.91 m)	253 lb (115 kg)	30 3/4 in (0.78 m)	8 1/2 in (0.22 m)
All values from NFL Combine

=== Seattle Seahawks ===
Plackemeier was selected by the Seattle Seahawks in the seventh round (239th overall pick) of the 2006 NFL draft and signed to a four-year, $1.65 million contract.

He was released from the Seahawks on September 9, 2008.

=== Washington Redskins ===
After beating out fellow veteran punter Josh Miller, Plackemeier was signed by the Redskins on October 14, 2008, due to injuries and poor performance that plagued former punter Durant Brooks. He became the second consecutive former Ray Guy Award-winning ACC punter to hold the job for the Redskins.

On February 12, 2009, he was waived by the Redskins.

=== Cincinnati Bengals ===
Plackemeier was claimed off waivers by the Cincinnati Bengals on February 13, 2009. He was waived on April 28, 2009.

== NFL career statistics ==
Legend
**Bold**	Career high

=== Regular season ===
Year	Team	Punting									
Year	Team	GP	Punts	Yds	Net Yds	Lng	Avg	Net Avg	Blk	Ins20	TB
2006	SEA	**16**	84	**3,778**	**3,135**	**72**	**45.0**	**37.3**	0	25	**15**
2007	SEA	**16**	**86**	3,436	2,954	62	40.0	34.3	0	**30**	6
2008	SEA	1	11	450	330	56	40.9	30.0	0	2	0
2008	WAS	10	55	2,291	1,901	62	41.7	33.9	**1**	15	10
Career		43	236	9,955	8,320	72	42.2	35.1	1	72	31

=== Playoffs ===
Year	Team	Punting									
Year	Team	GP	Punts	Yds	Net Yds	Lng	Avg	Net Avg	Blk	Ins20	TB
2006	SEA	**2**	**11**	393	371	**56**	35.7	33.7	0	4	0
2007	SEA	**2**	**11**	**452**	**450**	50	**41.1**	**40.9**	0	**5**	0
Career		4	22	845	821	56	38.4	37.3	0	9	0

== Personal ==
His father Steve, a math teacher at Mission Vista High School, was a swimmer and played water polo at Southeast Missouri State and uncle, Jim Israel, played basketball and baseball at Wake Forest. He double majored in communication and religion. He is married to his wife Kristen.
