= Jacob Green =

American football player (born 1957)

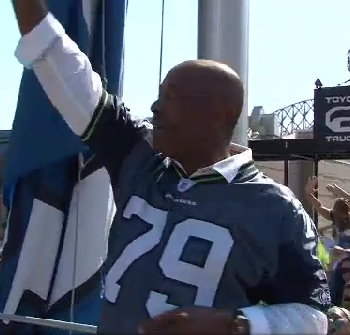
- Green raises the 12th Man flag at Qwest Field September 13, 2009

No. 76, 79
- Position: Defensive end

Personal information
- Born: January 21, 1957 (age 69); Pasadena, Texas, U.S.
- Listed height: 6 ft 2 in (1.88 m)
- Listed weight: 255 lb (116 kg)

Career information
- High school: Kashmere (Houston, Texas)
- College: Texas A&M
- NFL draft: 1980: 1st round, 10th overall pick

Career history
- Seattle Seahawks (1980–1991); San Francisco 49ers (1992)

Awards and highlights
- Second-team All-Pro (1984); 2× Pro Bowl (1986, 1987); PFWA All-Rookie Team (1980); Seattle Seahawks 35th Anniversary team; Seattle Seahawks Top 50 players; Seattle Seahawks Ring of Honor; First-team All-American (1979); First-team All-SWC (1978)

Career NFL statistics
- Sacks: 115.5
- Interceptions: 3
- Touchdowns: 4
- Stats at Pro Football Reference
- College Football Hall of Fame

Jacob Carl Green (born January 21, 1957) is an American former professional football player who was a defensive end in the National Football League (NFL). He played college football for the Texas A&M Aggies.

Green was an All-American selection in 1979 after compiling 134 tackles and was a then school-record 20 quarterback sacks. Green's 37 career sacks still rank second in A&M history behind Aaron Wallace’s 42 career sacks. Green owns school records for career fumbles caused (12) and season fumbles caused (six in 1978).

Green was a first-round draft pick (10th overall) in the 1980 NFL draft by the Seattle Seahawks. In his 13-year career in the NFL, Green played 12 seasons for the Seattle Seahawks, as number 79, and one season for the San Francisco 49ers. Green recorded 97.5 career sacks for the Seahawks (unofficially 115.5; sacks became an official NFL statistic in 1982, Green's third season), a team record and at the time of his retirement good for number three on the all-time sacks leaderboard behind only Reggie White and Lawrence Taylor.
