= 1996 Seattle Seahawks season =

American football team season

- Owner: Ken Behring
- Head coach: Dennis Erickson
- Offensive coordinator: Bob Bratkowski
- Defensive coordinator: Greg McMackin
- Home stadium: Kingdome

Results
- Record: 7–9
- Division place: 5th AFC West
- Playoffs: Did not qualify
- All-Pros: DT Cortez Kennedy (2nd team)
- Pro Bowlers: DE Michael Sinclair

The 1996 Seattle Seahawks season was the franchise's 21st season in the National Football League (NFL), the 21st playing their home games at the Kingdome and the second under head coach Dennis Erickson. They were unable to improve on their 8–8 record, finished the season 7–9, and missing the playoffs for the eighth consecutive season.

For the first time since 1984, safety Eugene Robinson was not on the opening day roster.

Owner Ken Behring unsuccessfully attempted to move the team to southern California. The team was sold to Paul Allen in June 1997.

After the season, the Seahawks would never finish at the bottom of the AFC West again. It would be the final season they finished at the bottom of their division for 25 years.

== NFL draft ==
1996 Seattle Seahawks draft
Round	Selection	Player	Position	College
1	21	Pete Kendall	OG	Boston College
2	46	Fred Thomas	DB	Tennessee-Martin
3	77	Robert Barr	OT	Rutgers
3	91	Reggie Brown	RB	Fresno State
4	99	Phillip Daniels	DE	Georgia
4	131	Eric Unverzagt	LB	Wisconsin
6	184	Reggie Green	OG	Florida
6	209	T. J. Cunningham	DB	Colorado
7	225	Johnie Church	DE	Florida

=== Undrafted free agents ===
1996 undrafted free agents of note
Player	Position	College
Willie Brown	Linebacker	Temple
Marc Collins	Punter	Eastern Kentucky
Jimmy Gary	Running back	West Virginia

== Personnel ==
=== Staff ===
1996 Seattle Seahawks staff
**Front office**: Owner – Ken Behring; President – David Behring; Executive vice president – Mickey Loomis; Vice president of football operations – Randy Mueller; Co-college scouting director – Mike Allman; Co-college scouting director – Phil Neri; Assistant player personnel director – Rick Thompson; **Head coaches**: Head coach – Dennis Erickson; Assistant head coach/tight ends – Gregg Smith; **Offensive coaches**: Offensive coordinator/wide receivers – Bob Bratkowski; Quarterbacks – Rich Olson; Running backs – Clarence Shelmon; Offensive line – Howard Mudd; Offensive staff assistant – Ned James	**Defensive coaches**: Defensive coordinator – Greg McMackin; Defensive line – Tommy Brasher; Linebackers – Mike Murphy; Defensive backs – Willy Robinson; Defensive – Dave Brown; Quality assistant – Keith Gilbertson; **Special teams coaches**: Special teams – Dave Arnold; **Strength and conditioning**: Strength and conditioning – Dana LeDuc

=== Final roster ===
1996 Seattle Seahawks roster
**Quarterbacks (QB)**: 8 Stan Gelbaugh; **3** Rick Mirer; 13 Gino Torretta; **Running backs (RB)**: 31 Steve Broussard; 32 Oscar Gray; 28 Dou Innocent; 36 Lamar Smith; **38** Mack Strong FB; **42** Chris Warren; **Wide receivers (WR)**: **84** Joey Galloway; 81 Ronnie Harris; 82 James McKnight; 85 Mike Pritchard; 88 Ricky Proehl; **Tight ends (TE)**: 45 Coleman Bell; 87 Carlester Crumpler; 83 Ronnie Williams	**Offensive linemen (OL)**: **74** James Atkins T; **75** Howard Ballard T; 64 Robert Barr T; 63 Frank Beede G; 79 Ed Cunningham C/G; **77** Derrick Graham G; **66** Pete Kendall G; **52** Kevin Mawae C; 69 Grant Williams T; **Defensive linemen (DL)**: **98** Sam Adams DT; 93 Phillip Daniels DE; 94 Antonio Edwards DE; **96** Cortez Kennedy DT; 67 Matt LaBounty DE; **99** Michael McCrary DE; 92 Henry McMillian DT; 72 Joe Nash DT; 78 Pat Riley DE; **70** Michael Sinclair DE	**Linebackers (LB)**: 54 Mike Barber OLB; 56 James Logan OLB; **55** Winston Moss OLB; 53 Eric Unverzagt MLB; **95** Dean Wells MLB; **90** Terry Wooden OLB; **Defensive backs (DB)**: 20 Jay Bellamy FS; **25** Robert Blackmon SS; **26** Carlton Gray CB; **30** Corey Harris CB; 24 Selwyn Jones CB; 23 Dexter Seigler CB; 22 Fred Thomas CB; **33** Darryl Williams FS; **Special teams (ST)**: 57 Jason Kyle LS; 2 Todd Peterson K; 14 Rick Tuten P	**Practice squad**: 60 Greg Bloedorn C; 7 Jon Kitna QB; 76 Riddick Parker DT; 16 Grayson Shillingford WR; **Reserve**: 48 Clarence Benford TE (IR); 89 Brian Blades WR (IR); 34 Reggie Brown FB (IR); 91 Keif Bryant DT (IR); 21 T. J. Cunningham S (IR); 86 Christian Fauria TE (IR); 17 John Friesz QB (IR); 19 Eddie Goines WR (IR); 97 Glenn Montgomery DT (IR); 51 John Solomon LB (IR); 59 Tyronne Stowe LB (IR); Rookies in italics 53 active, 11 reserve, 4 practice squad

- Starters in bold.
- (*) Denotes players that were selected for the 1997 Pro Bowl.

== Schedule ==
=== Preseason ===
Week	Date	Opponent	Result	Record	Game site	Recap
1	August 3	Atlanta Falcons	**W** 19–17	1–0	Kingdome	Recap
2	August 8	at Oakland Raiders	**W** 24–19	2–0	Oakland–Alameda County Coliseum	Recap
3	August 17	at Indianapolis Colts	**L** 13–15	2–1	RCA Dome	Recap
4	August 23	San Francisco 49ers	**W** 20–3	3–1	Kingdome	Recap

Source: Seahawks Media Guides

=== Regular season ===
Divisional matchups have the AFC West playing the NFC Central.

Week	Date	Opponent	Result	Record	Game site	Recap
1	September 1	at **San Diego Chargers**	**L** 7–29	0–1	Jack Murphy Stadium	Recap
2	September 8	**Denver Broncos**	**L** 20–30	0–2	Kingdome	Recap
3	September 15	**Kansas City Chiefs**	**L** 17–35	0–3	Kingdome	Recap
4	September 22	at Tampa Bay Buccaneers	**W** 17–13	1–3	Houlihan's Stadium	Recap
5	September 29	Green Bay Packers	**L** 10–31	1–4	Kingdome	Recap
6	October 6	at Miami Dolphins	**W** 22–15	2–4	Pro Player Stadium	Recap
7	Bye					
8	October 17	at **Kansas City Chiefs**	**L** 17–34	2–5	Arrowhead Stadium	Recap
9	October 27	**San Diego Chargers**	**W** 32–13	3–5	Kingdome	Recap
10	November 3	Houston Oilers	**W** 23–16	4–5	Kingdome	Recap
11	November 10	Minnesota Vikings	**W** 42–23	5–5	Kingdome	Recap
12	November 17	at Detroit Lions	**L** 16–17	5–6	Silverdome	Recap
13	November 24	**Oakland Raiders**	**L** 21–27	5–7	Kingdome	Recap
14	December 1	at **Denver Broncos**	**L** 7–34	5–8	Mile High Stadium	Recap
15	December 8	Buffalo Bills	**W** 26–18	6–8	Kingdome	Recap
16	December 15	at Jacksonville Jaguars	**L** 13–20	6–9	Jacksonville Municipal Stadium	Recap
17	December 22	at **Oakland Raiders**	**W** 28–21	7–9	Oakland–Alameda County Coliseum	Recap
Note: Intra-division opponents are in **bold** text.

Source: 1996 NFL season results

== Standings ==
AFC West
	W	L	T	PCT	PF	PA	STK
^{(1)} Denver Broncos	13	3	0	.813	391	275	L1
Kansas City Chiefs	9	7	0	.563	297	300	L3
San Diego Chargers	8	8	0	.500	310	376	W1
Oakland Raiders	7	9	0	.438	340	293	L2
Seattle Seahawks	7	9	0	.438	317	376	W1

== Game summaries ==
=== Preseason ===
==== Week P1: vs. Atlanta Falcons ====
Preseason Week One: Seattle Seahawks vs. Atlanta Falcons – Game summary

Quarter	1	2	3	4	Total
Falcons	7	3	0	7	17
Seahawks	0	10	9	0	19

at Kingdome, Seattle

- Date: August 3
- Game time: 7:06 pm local
- Game weather: indoors
- Game attendance: 30,284
- Referee: Howard Roe
- TV: KING
- Gamebook

==== Week P2: at Oakland Raiders ====
Preseason Week Two: Seattle Seahawks at Oakland Raiders – Game summary

Quarter	1	2	3	4	Total
Seahawks	7	14	0	3	24
Raiders	0	3	3	13	19

at Oakland–Alameda County Coliseum, Oakland, California

- Date: August 3
- Game time: 5:05 pm local
- Game weather: partly cloudy, 63 °F (17 °C), 76% humidity, wind WNW 10 miles per hour (16 km/h)
- Game attendance: 38,219
- Referee: Ed Hochuli
- TV: KING
- Gamebook

==== Week P3: at Indianapolis Colts ====
Preseason Week Three: Seattle Seahawks at Indianapolis Colts – Game summary

Quarter	1	2	3	4	Total
Seahawks	3	0	0	10	13
Colts	3	0	0	12	15

at RCA Dome, Indianapolis

- Date: August 17
- Game time: 7:01 pm local
- Game weather: indoors
- Game attendance: 38,930
- Referee: Red Cashion
- TV: KING
- Gamebook

==== Week P4: vs. San Francisco 49ers ====
Preseason Week Four: Seattle Seahawks vs. San Francisco 49ers – Game summary

Quarter	1	2	3	4	Total
49ers	3	0	0	0	3
Seahawks	3	0	10	7	20

at Kingdome, Seattle

- Date: August 23
- Game time: 7:06 pm local
- Game weather: indoors
- Game attendance: 38,144
- Referee: Dick Hantak
- TV: KING
- Gamebook

=== Regular season ===
==== Week 1: at San Diego Chargers ====
Week One: Seattle Seahawks at San Diego Chargers – Game summary

Quarter	1	2	3	4	Total
Seahawks	0	7	0	0	7
Chargers	7	6	3	13	29

at San Diego Stadium, San Diego, California

- Date: September 1
- Game time: 1:05 pm local
- Game weather: clear, 84 °F (29 °C), 73% humidity, wind WSW 8 miles per hour (13 km/h)
- Game attendance: 58,780
- Referee: Jerry Markbreit
- TV announcers (NBC): Jim Lampley, Bob Golic
- Gamebook

Game information

First quarter

- SD – Tony Martin 2-yard pass from Stan Humphries (John Carney kick), 2:15 (SD 7–0)

Second quarter

- SEA – Rick Mirer 5-yard run (Todd Peterson kick), 12:01 (Tied 7–7)
- SD – John Carney 35-yard field goal, 1:26 (SD 10–7)
- SD – John Carney 53-yard field goal, 0:00 (SD 13–7)

Third quarter

- SD – John Carney 22-yard field goal, 2:34 (SD 16–7)

Fourth quarter

- SD – John Carney 50-yard field goal, 13:34 (SD 19–7)
- SD – Leonard Russell 6-yard run (John Carney kick), 11:39 (SD 26–7)
- SD – John Carney 31-yard field goal, 10:28 (SD 29–7)

Top passers

- SEA – Rick Mirer: 24/41, 251 yds, 2 INT
- SD – Stan Humphries: 20/38, 195 yds, 1 TD

Top rushers

- SEA – Chris Warren: 13 car, 50 yds
- SD – Aaron Hayden: 11 car, 59 yds

Top receivers

- SEA – Joey Galloway: 4 rec, 89 yds
- SD – Tony Martin: 7 rec, 66 yds, 1 TD

Team – pass – rush – total – to

- SEA – 251 – 106 – 357 – 4
- SD – 191 – 186 – 377 – 0

==== Week 2: vs. Denver Broncos ====
Week Two: Seattle Seahawks vs. Denver Broncos – Game summary

Quarter	1	2	3	4	Total
Broncos	3	10	7	10	30
Seahawks	3	3	7	7	20

at Kingdome, Seattle

- Date: September 8
- Game time: 1:04 pm local
- Game weather: indoors
- Game attendance: 43,671
- Referee: Ed Hochuli
- TV announcers (NBC): Charlie Jones, Randy Cross
- Gamebook

Game information

First quarter

- DEN – Jason Elam 18-yard field goal, 7:08 (DEN 3–0)
- SEA – Todd Peterson 27-yard field goal, 0:30 (Tied 3–3)

Second quarter

- SEA – Todd Peterson 40-yard field goal, 8:16 (SEA 6–3)
- DEN – Aaron Craver 39-yard pass from John Elway (Jason Elam kick), 5:29 (DEN 10–6)
- DEN – Jason Elam 28-yard field goal, 0:10 (DEN 13–6)

Third quarter

- SEA – Joey Galloway 88-yard punt return (Todd Peterson kick), 7:10 (Tied 13–13)
- DEN – Anthony Miller 7-yard pass from John Elway (Jason Elam kick), 1:06 (DEN 20–13)

Fourth quarter

- DEN – Jason Elam 33-yard field goal, 10:32 (DEN 23–13)
- SEA – Christian Fauria 23-yard pass from John Friesz (Todd Peterson kick), 4:14 (DEN 23–20)
- DEN – John Elway 1-yard run (Jason Elam kick), 2:00 (DEN 30–20)

Top passers

- DEN – John Elway: 18/28, 209 yds, 2 TD
- SEA – John Friesz: 11/19, 137 yds, 1 TD

Top rushers

- DEN – Terrell Davis: 28 car, 111 yds
- SEA – Chris Warren: 14 car, 35 yds

Top receivers

- DEN – Anthony Miller: 4 rec, 49 yds, 1 TD
- SEA – Brian Blades: 4 rec, 57 yds

Team – pass – rush – total – to

- DEN – 194 – 180 – 374 – 1
- SEA – 172 – 39 – 211 – 3

==== Week 3: vs. Kansas City Chiefs ====
Week Three: Seattle Seahawks vs. Kansas City Chiefs – Game summary

Quarter	1	2	3	4	Total
Chiefs	14	7	7	7	35
Seahawks	0	10	0	7	17

at Kingdome, Seattle

- Date: September 15
- Game time: 1:04 pm local
- Game weather: indoors
- Game attendance: 39,790
- Referee: Mike Carey
- TV announcers (NBC): Don Criqui & Beasley Reece
- Gamebook

Game information

First quarter

- KC – Chris Penn 9-yard pass from Steve Bono (Pete Stoyanovich kick), 10:07 (KC 7–0)
- KC – Dale Carter 46-yard pass from Steve Bono (Pete Stoyanovich kick), 4:51 (KC 14–0)

Second quarter

- SEA – Todd Peterson 47-yard field goal, 9:05 (KC 14–3)
- SEA – Lamar Smith 4-yard run (Todd Peterson kick), 1:51 (KC 14–10)
- KC – Chris Penn 1-yard pass from Steve Bono (Pete Stoyanovich kick), 0:24 (KC 21–10)

Third quarter

- KC – Marcus Allen 2-yard run (Pete Stoyanovich kick), 9:44 (KC 28–10)

Fourth quarter

- SEA – Rick Mirer 1-yard run (Todd Peterson kick), 13:28 (KC 28–17)
- KC – Marcus Allen 1-yard run (Pete Stoyanovich kick), 3:19 (KC 34–17)

Top passers

- KC – Steve Bono: 18/27, 185 yds, 3 TD
- SEA – Rick Mirer: 15/31, 159 yds, 1 INT

Top rushers

- KC – Greg Hill: 11 car, 57 yds
- SEA – Lamar Smith: 8 car, 73 yds, 1 TD

Top receivers

- KC – Dale Carter: 3 rec, 61 yds, 1 TD
- SEA – Joey Galloway: 4 rec, 57 yds

Team – pass – rush – total – to

- KC – 166 – 157 – 323 – 2
- SEA – 141 – 97 – 238 – 1

==== Week 4: at Tampa Bay Buccaneers ====
Week Four: Seattle Seahawks at Tampa Bay Buccaneers – Game summary

Quarter	1	2	3	4	Total
Seahawks	0	3	0	14	17
Buccaneers	3	7	0	3	13

at Houlihan's Stadium, Tampa, Florida

- Date: September 22
- Game time: 4:05 pm local
- Game weather: clear, 77 °F (25 °C), 89% humidity, wind WSW 3 miles per hour (4.8 km/h)
- Game attendance: 30,212
- Referee: Bob McElwee
- TV announcers (NBC): Don Criqui & Beasley Reece
- Gamebook

Game information

First quarter

- TB – Michael Husted 33-yard field goal, 5:54 (TB 3–0)

Second quarter

- SEA – Todd Peterson 33-yard field goal, 14:13 (Tied 3–3)
- TB – Reggie Brooks 2-yard run (Michael Husted kick), 1:12 (TB 10–3)

Third quarter

- No scoring plays

Fourth quarter

- TB – Michael Husted 28-yard field goal, 9:20 (TB 13–3)
- SEA – Brian Blades 5-yard pass from Rick Mirer (Todd Peterson kick), 3:00 (TB 13–10)
- SEA – Lamar Smith 14-yard run (Todd Peterson kick), 0:31 (SEA 17–13)

Top passers

- SEA – Rick Mirer: 20/37, 209 yds, 1 TD, 1 INT
- TB – Trent Dilfer: 15/26, 118 yds, 1 INT

Top rushers

- SEA – Chris Warren: 12 car, 38 yds
- TB – Reggie Brooks: 26 car, 65 yds, 1 TD

Top receivers

- SEA – Brian Blades: 9 rec, 92 yds, 1 TD
- TB – Alvin Harper: 3 rec, 48 yds

Team – pass – rush – total – to

- SEA – 198 – 124 – 322 – 1
- TB – 106 – 111 – 217 – 1

==== Week 5: vs. Green Bay Packers ====
Week Five: Seattle Seahawks vs. Green Bay Packers – Game summary

Quarter	1	2	3	4	Total
Packers	10	7	7	7	31
Seahawks	0	7	3	0	10

at Kingdome, Seattle

- Date: September 29
- Game time: 1:04 pm local
- Game weather: indoors
- Game attendance: 59,973
- Referee: Ron Blum
- TV announcers (Fox): Kevin Harlan, Jerry Glanville
- Gamebook

Game information

First quarter

- GB – Antonio Freeman 13-yard pass from Brett Favre (Chris Jacke kick), 4:36 (GB 7–0)
- GB – Chris Jacke 36-yard field goal, 0:34 (GB 10–0)

Second quarter

- GB – Dorsey Levens 4-yard pass from Brett Favre (Chris Jacke kick), 3:54 (GB 17–0)
- SEA – Chris Warren 37-yard run (Todd Peterson kick), 1:56 (GB 17–7)

Third quarter

- GB – Keith Jackson 10-yard pass from Brett Favre (Chris Jacke kick), 8:24 (GB 24–7)
- SEA – Todd Peterson 44-yard field goal, 5:35 (GB 24–10)

Fourth quarter

- GB – Antonio Freeman 4-yard pass from Brett Favre (Chris Jacke kick), 9:50 (GB 31–10)

Top passers

- GB – Brett Favre: 20/34, 209 yds, 4 TD
- SEA – Rick Mirer: 10/30, 156 yds, 4 INT

Top rushers

- GB – Edgar Bennett: 22 car, 94 yds
- SEA – Chris Warren: 18 car, 103 yds, 1 TD

Top receivers

- GB – Antonio Freeman: 7 rec, 108 yds, 2 TD
- SEA – Mike Pritchard: 2 rec, 54 yds

Team – pass – rush – total – to

- GB – 202 – 142 – 344 – 0
- SEA – 170 – 159 – 329 – 5

==== Week 6: at Miami Dolphins ====
Week Six: Seattle Seahawks at Miami Dolphins – Game summary

Quarter	1	2	3	4	Total
Seahawks	7	7	0	8	22
Dolphins	3	6	6	0	15

at Pro Player Stadium, Miami

- Date: October 6
- Game time: 1:01 pm local
- Game weather: cloudy, 76 °F (24 °C), 96% humidity, wind W 5 miles per hour (8.0 km/h)
- Game attendance: 59,539
- Referee: Tom White
- TV announcers (NBC): Marv Albert, Sam Wyche
- Gamebook

Game information

First quarter

- MIA – Joe Nedney 53-yard field goal, 7:30 (MIA 3–0)
- SEA – Joey Galloway 65-yard pass from Rick Mirer (Todd Peterson kick), 0:00 (SEA 7–3)

Second quarter

- SEA – Joey Galloway 51-yard pass from Rick Mirer (Todd Peterson kick), 12:05 (SEA 14–3)
- MIA – Randal Hill 33-yard pass from Craig Erickson (PAT failed), 0:51 (SEA 14–9)

Third quarter

- MIA – Irving Spikes 2-yard run (PAT failed), 0:55 (MIA 15–14)

Fourth quarter

- SEA – Brian Blades 80-yard pass from John Friesz (2pt-PAT: Lamar Smith run), 2:03 (SEA 22–15)

Top passers

- SEA – John Friesz: 18/32, 299 yds, 3 TD, 1 INT
- MIA – Craig Erickson: 16/28, 243 yds, 1 TD, 1 INT

Top rushers

- SEA – Lamar Smith: 7 car, 35 yds
- MIA – Irving Spikes: 19 car, 48 yds, 1 TD

Top receivers

- SEA – Joey Galloway: 5 rec, 137 yds, 2 TD
- MIA – Jerris McPhail: 6 rec, 86 yds

Team – pass – rush – total – to

- SEA – 299 – 59 – 358 – 3
- MIA – 214 – 85 – 299 – 3

==== Week 8: at Kansas City Chiefs ====
Week Eight: Seattle Seahawks at Kansas City Chiefs – Game summary

Quarter	1	2	3	4	Total
Seahawks	0	3	7	6	16
Chiefs	10	10	7	7	34

at Arrowhead Stadium, Kansas City, Missouri

- Date: October 17
- Game time: 7:01 pm local
- Game weather: partly cloudy, 49 °F (9 °C), 61% humidity, wind NW 12 miles per hour (19 km/h)
- Game attendance: 76,057
- Referee: Bernie Kukar
- TV announcers (TNT): Verne Lundquist, Pat Haden
- Gamebook

Game information

First quarter

- KC – Pete Stoyanovich 42-yard field goal, 10:28 (KC 3–0)
- KC – Kimble Anders 15-yard run (Pete Stoyanovich kick), 3:41 (KC 10–0)

Second quarter

- KC – Marcus Allen 1-yard run (Pete Stoyanovich kick), 3:47 (KC 17–0)
- SEA – Todd Peterson 19-yard field goal, 0:26 (KC 17–3)
- KC – Pete Stoyanovich 43-yard field goal, 0:00 (KC 20–3)

Third quarter

- SEA – Chris Warren 50-yard run (Todd Peterson kick), 11:06 (KC 20–10)
- KC – Marcus Allen 1-yard run (Pete Stoyanovich kick), 0:21 (KC 27–10)

Fourth quarter

- KC – Sean LaChapelle 4-yard pass from Steve Bono (Pete Stoyanovich kick), 6:40 (KC 34–10)
- SEA – Joey Galloway 16-yard pass from John Friesz (PAT failed), 1:01 (KC 34–16)

Top passers

- SEA – John Friesz: 20/34, 238 yds, 1 TD, 1 INT
- KC – Steve Bono: 17/26, 194 yds, 1 TD

Top rushers

- SEA – Chris Warren: 14 car, 81 yds, 1 TD
- KC – Marcus Allen: 14 car, 39 yds, 2 TD

Top receivers

- SEA – Joey Galloway: 3 rec, 65 yds, 1 TD
- KC – Chris Penn: 5 rec, 69 yds

Team – pass – rush – total – to

- SEA – 213 – 110 – 323 – 1
- KC – 194 – 146 – 340 – 1

==== Week 9: vs. San Diego Chargers ====
Week Nine: Seattle Seahawks vs. San Diego Chargers – Game summary

Quarter	1	2	3	4	Total
Chargers	3	3	0	7	13
Seahawks	3	17	3	9	32

at Kingdome, Seattle

- Date: October 27
- Game time: 1:04 pm local
- Game weather: indoors
- Game attendance: 38,143
- Referee: Walt Coleman
- TV announcers (NBC): Jim Lampley & Bob Golic
- Gamebook

Game information

First quarter

- SEA – Todd Peterson 33-yard field goal, 11:15 (SEA 3–0)
- SD – John Carney 41-yard field goal, 7:00 (Tied 3–3)

Second quarter

- SD – John Carney 43-yard field goal, 13:30 (SD 6–3)
- SEA – Todd Peterson 44-yard field goal, 11:00 (Tied 6–6)
- SEA – Lamar Smith 10-yard run (Todd Peterson kick), 6:42 (SEA 13–6)
- SEA – Darryl Williams 79-yard interception return (Todd Peterson kick), 2:39 (SEA 20–6)

Third quarter

- SEA – Todd Peterson 47-yard field goal, 4:17 (SEA 23–6)

Fourth quarter

- SEA – Todd Peterson 27-yard field goal, 13:45 (SEA 26–6)
- SD – Charlie Jones 27-yard pass from Sean Salisbury (John Carney kick), 12:36 (SEA 26–13)
- SEA – Chris Warren 37-yard run (PAT failed), 4:48 (SEA 32–13)

Top passers

- SD – Sean Salisbury: 21/43, 291 yds, 1 TD, 4 INT
- SEA – John Friesz: 16/33, 206 yds

Top rushers

- SD – Terrell Fletcher: 8 car, 36 yds
- SEA – Chris Warren: 19 car, 146 yds, 1 TD

Top receivers

- SD – Charlie Jones: 7 rec, 79 yds, 1 TD
- SEA – Brian Blades: 4 rec, 66 yds

Team – pass – rush – total – to

- SD – 253 – 69 – 322 – 5
- SEA – 196 – 208 – 404 – 1

==== Week 10: vs. Houston Oilers ====
Week Ten: Seattle Seahawks vs. Houston Oilers – Game summary

Quarter	1	2	3	4	Total
Oilers	3	0	3	10	16
Seahawks	3	3	3	14	23

at Kingdome, Seattle

- Date: November 3
- Game time: 1:03 pm local
- Game weather: indoors
- Game attendance: 36,320
- Referee: Johnny Grier
- TV announcers (NBC): Dan Hicks & Bob Golic
- Gamebook

Game information

First quarter

- HOU – Al Del Greco 35-yard field goal, 8:43 (HOU 3–0)
- SEA – Todd Peterson 25-yard field goal, 2:53 (Tied 3–3)

Second quarter

- SEA – Todd Peterson 35-yard field goal, 6:01 (SEA 6–3)

Third quarter

- HOU – Al Del Greco 36-yard field goal, 5:03 (Tied 6–6)
- SEA – Todd Peterson 44-yard field goal, 2:31 (SEA 9–6)

Fourth quarter

- HOU – Al Del Greco 45-yard field goal, 14:55 (Tied 9–9)
- HOU – Chris Sanders 65-yard pass from Steve McNair (Al Del Greco kick), 8:12 (HOU 16–9)
- SEA – Joey Galloway 14-yard pass from Rick Mirer (John Friesz kick), 3:30 (Tied 16–16)
- SEA – Robert Blackmon 61-yard blocked field goal return (Todd Peterson kick), 0:04 (SEA 23–16)

Top passers

- HOU – Steve McNair: 12/18, 225 yds, 1 TD, 1 INT
- SEA – John Friesz: 24/38, 323 yds, 1 TD, 1 INT

Top rushers

- HOU – Eddie George: 25 car, 91 yds
- SEA – Chris Warren: 16 car, 34 yds

Top receivers

- HOU – Chris Sanders: 1 rec, 65 yds, 1 TD
- SEA – Joey Galloway: 8 rec, 94 yds, 1 TD

Team – pass – rush – total – to

- HOU – 225 – 128 – 353 – 1
- SEA – 310 – 32 – 342 – 1

==== Week 11: vs. Minnesota Vikings ====
Week Eleven: Seattle Seahawks vs. Minnesota Vikings – Game summary

Quarter	1	2	3	4	Total
Vikings	0	7	0	16	23
Seahawks	10	18	7	7	42

at Kingdome, Seattle

- Date: November 10
- Game time: 1:05 pm local
- Game weather: indoors
- Game attendance: 50,794
- Referee: Ed Hochuli
- TV announcers (Fox): Kenny Albert, Tim Green
- Gamebook

Game information

First quarter

- SEA – Todd Peterson 54-yard field goal, 10:36 (SEA 3–0)
- SEA – Lamar Smith 1-yard run (Todd Peterson kick), 4:47 (SEA 10–0)

Second quarter

- SEA – Todd Peterson 38-yard field goal, 9:34 (SEA 13–0)
- MIN – Jake Reed 38-yard pass from Warren Moon (Scott Sisson kick), 3:48 (SEA 13–7)
- SEA – Joey Galloway 7-yard pass from John Friesz (2-pt PAT: Lamar Smith run), 0:55 (SEA 21–7)
- SEA – Steve Broussard 26-yard run (Todd Peterson kick), 0:11 (SEA 28–7)

Third quarter

- SEA – Chris Warren 216-yard run (Todd Peterson kick), 9:38 (SEA 35–7)

Fourth quarter

- SEA – Ricky Proehl 22-yard pass from John Friesz (Todd Peterson kick), 12:45 (SEA 42–7)
- MIN – Brad Johnson 1-yard run (2-pt PAT: Andrew Jordan pass from Brad Johnson), 2:40 (SEA 42–15)
- MIN – Jake Reed 14-yard pass from Brad Johnson (2-pt PAT: Chris Walsh pass from Brad Johnson), 1:34 (SEA 42–23)

Top passers

- MIN – Warren Moon: 14/30, 187 yds, 1 TD, 2 INT
- SEA – John Friesz: 22/33, 263 yds, 2 TD

Top rushers

- MIN – Scottie Graham: 6 car, 9 yds
- SEA – Lamar Smith: 15 car, 90 yds, 1 TD

Top receivers

- MIN – Cris Carter: 7 rec, 142 yds
- SEA – Ricky Proehl: 6 rec, 95 yds, 1 TD

Team – pass – rush – total – to

- MIN – 300 – 15 – 315 – 4
- SEA – 253 – 199 – 452 – 1

==== Week 12: at Detroit Lions ====
Week Twelve: Seattle Seahawks at Detroit Lions – Game summary

Quarter	1	2	3	4	Total
Seahawks	7	3	3	3	16
Lions	0	7	7	3	17

at Silverdome, Pontiac, Michigan

- Date: November 17
- Game time: 1:01 pm local
- Game weather: indoors
- Game attendance: 51,194
- Referee: Larry Nemmers
- TV announcers (NBC): Dan Hicks, Bart Oates
- Gamebook

Game information

First quarter

- SEA – Lamar Smith 1-yard run (Todd Peterson kick), 6:40 (SEA 7–0)

Second quarter

- SEA – Todd Peterson 24-yard field goal, 9:56 (SEA 10–0)
- DET – Barry Sanders 11-yard run (Jason Hanson kick), 2:46 (SEA 10–7)

Third quarter

- SEA – Todd Peterson 25-yard field goal, 12:38 (SEA 13–7)
- DET – Herman Moore 6-yard pass from Don Majkowski (Jason Hanson kick), 1:52 (DET 14–13)

Fourth quarter

- SEA – Todd Peterson 21-yard field goal, 9:05 (SEA 16–14)
- DET – Jason Hanson 43-yard field goal, 4:32 (DET 17–14)

Top passers

- SEA – John Friesz: 8/18, 148 yds, 1 INT
- DET – Don Majkowski: 18/23, 157 yds, 1 TD, 1 INT

Top rushers

- SEA – Lamar Smith: 33 car, 148 yds, 1 TD
- DET – Barry Sanders: 16 car, 134 yds, 1 TD

Top receivers

- SEA – James McKnight: 1 rec, 73 yds
- DET – Herman Moore: 6 rec, 55 yds, 1 TD

Team – pass – rush – total – to

- SEA – 194 – 184 – 378 – 1
- DET – 141 – 144 – 285 – 1

==== Week 13: vs. Oakland Raiders ====
Week Thirteen: Seattle Seahawks vs. Oakland Raiders – Game summary

Quarter	1	2	3	4	Total
Raiders	0	14	3	10	27
Seahawks	3	7	3	8	21

at Kingdome, Seattle

- Date: November 24
- Game time: 1:05 pm local
- Game weather: indoors
- Game attendance: 47,506
- Referee: Jerry Markbreit
- TV announcers (NBC): Dan Hicks, Sam Wyche
- Gamebook

Game information

First quarter

- SEA – Todd Peterson 21-yard field goal, 7:11 (SEA 3–0)

Second quarter

- OAK – James Jett 17-yard pass from Jeff Hostetler (Cole Ford kick), 11:51 (OAK 7–3)
- SEA – Ronnie Williams 2-yard pass from Rick Mirer (Todd Peterson kick), 9:13 (SEA 10–7)
- OAK – Rick Cunningham 3-yard pass from Jeff Hostetler (Cole Ford kick), 4:01 (OAK 14–10)

Third quarter

- OAK – Cole Ford 47-yard field goal, 10:23 (OAK 17–10)
- SEA – Todd Peterson 32-yard field goal, 4:55 (OAK 17–13)

Fourth quarter

- OAK – Derrick Fenner 1-yard run (Cole Ford kick), 13:33 (OAK 24–13)
- SEA – Chris Warren 2-yard run (2-pt PAT: Chris Warren run), 11:10 (OAK 24–21)
- OAK – Cole Ford 26-yard field goal, 1:56 (OAK 27–21)

Top passers

- OAK – Jeff Hostetler: 13/23, 178 yds, 2 TD
- SEA – Rick Mirer: 16/25, 181 yds, 1 TD

Top rushers

- OAK – Napoleon Kaufman: 15 car, 104 yds
- SEA – Chris Warren: 18 car, 88 yds, 1 TD

Top receivers

- OAK – Tim Brown: 6 rec, 77 yds
- SEA – Joey Galloway: 3 rec, 99 yds

Team – pass – rush – total – to

- OAK – 149 – 200 – 349 – 1
- SEA – 166 – 130 – 296 – 1

==== Week 14 at Denver Broncos ====
Week Fourteen: Seattle Seahawks at Denver Broncos – Game summary

Quarter	1	2	3	4	Total
Seahawks	7	0	0	0	7
Broncos	14	13	7	0	34

at Mile High Stadium, Denver, Colorado

- Date: December 1
- Game time: 2:04 pm local
- Game weather: partly cloudy, 50 °F (10 °C), 21% humidity, wind S 6 miles per hour (9.7 km/h)
- Game attendance: 74,982
- Referee: Ron Blum
- TV announcers (NBC): Tom Hammond, Bob Trumpy
- Gamebook

Game information

First quarter

- DEN – Shannon Sharpe 1-yard pass from John Elway (Jason Elam kick), 11:36 (DEN 7–0)
- SEA – Mike Pritchard 8-yard pass from Rick Mirer (Todd Peterson kick), 5:25 (Tied 7–7)
- DEN – John Elway 2-yard run (Jason Elam kick), 1:51 (DEN 14–7)

Second quarter

- DEN – Jason Elam 44-yard field goal, 9:16 (DEN 17–7)
- DEN – Jason Elam 18-yard field goal, 1:47 (DEN 20–7)
- DEN – Ed McCaffrey 4-yard pass from John Elway (Jason Elam kick), 0:30 (DEN 27–7)

Third quarter

- DEN – Terrell Davis 5-yard run (Jason Elam kick), 6:53 (DEN 34–7)

Fourth quarter

- No scoring plays

Top passers

- SEA – Rick Mirer: 13/28, 177 yds, 1 TD, 2 INT
- DEN – John Elway: 17/27, 189 yds, 2 TD

Top rushers

- SEA – Lamar Smith: 8 car, 42 yds
- DEN – Terrell Davis: 26 car, 106 yds, 1 TD

Top receivers

- SEA – Joey Galloway: 5 rec, 108 yds
- DEN – Aaron Craver: 3 rec, 66 yds

Team – pass – rush – total – to

- SEA – 172 – 105 – 277 – 3
- DEN – 236 – 205 – 441 – 0

==== Week 15: vs. Buffalo Bills ====
Week Fifteen: Seattle Seahawks vs. Buffalo Bills – Game summary

Quarter	1	2	3	4	Total
Bills	0	8	0	10	18
Seahawks	10	6	3	7	26

at Kingdome, Seattle

- Date: December 8
- Game time: 1:05 pm local
- Game weather: indoors
- Game attendance: 41,373
- Referee: Howard Roe
- TV announcers (NBC): Charlie Jones, Randy Cross
- Gamebook

Game information

First quarter

- SEA – Joey Galloway 27-yard pass from Rick Mirer (Todd Peterson kick), 11:57 (SEA 7–0)
- SEA – Todd Peterson 41-yard field goal, 3:45 (SEA 10–0)

Second quarter

- SEA – Todd Peterson 38-yard field goal, 13:59 (SEA 13–0)
- SEA – Todd Peterson 22-yard field goal, 8:12 (SEA 16–0)
- BUF – Eric Moulds 37-yard pass from Jim Kelly (2-pt PAT: Quinn Early pass from Jim Kelly), 1:05 (SEA 16–8)

Third quarter

- SEA – Todd Peterson 30-yard field goal, 8:33 (SEA 19–8)

Fourth quarter

- BUF – Steve Christie 22-yard field goal, 11:36 (SEA 19–11)
- SEA – Lamar Smith 12-yard run (Todd Peterson kick), 8:41 (SEA 26–11)
- BUF – Chris Brantley 22-yard pass from Todd Collins (Steve Christie kick), 3:41 (SEA 26–18)

Top passers

- BUF – Jim Kelly: 24/41, 324 yds, 1 TD, 2 INT
- SEA – Rick Mirer: 9/23, 147 yds, 1 TD

Top rushers

- BUF – Thurman Thomas: 17 car, 65 yds
- SEA – Chris Warren: 21 car, 116 yds

Top receivers

- BUF – Eric Moulds: 5 rec, 89 yds, 1 TD
- SEA – Ricky Proehl: 4 rec, 91 yds

Team – pass – rush – total – to

- BUF – 312 – 79 – 391 – 5
- SEA – 132 – 170 – 302 – 0

==== Week 16: at Jacksonville Jaguars ====
Week Sixteen: Seattle Seahawks at Jacksonville Jaguars – Game summary

Quarter	1	2	3	4	Total
Seahawks	0	10	3	0	13
Jaguars	7	0	0	13	20

at Jacksonville Municipal Stadium, Jacksonville, Florida

- Date: December 15
- Game time: 8:03 pm local
- Game weather: clear, 47 °F (8 °C), 76% humidity, wind NE 10 miles per hour (16 km/h)
- Game attendance: 66,134
- Referee: Red Cashion
- TV announcers (ESPN): Mike Patrick, Joe Theismann, and Mark Malone
- Gamebook

Game information

First quarter

- JAX – Jimmy Smith 12-yard pass from Mark Brunell (Mike Hollis kick), 2:05 (JAX 7–0)

Second quarter

- SEA – Todd Peterson 27-yard field goal, 10:29 (JAX 7–3)
- SEA – Ricky Proehl 10-yard pass from Rick Mirer (Todd Peterson kick), 0:36 (SEA 10–7)

Third quarter

- SEA – Todd Peterson 24-yard field goal, 1:54 (SEA 13–7)

Fourth quarter

- JAX – Jimmy Smith 39-yard pass from Mark Brunell (Mike Hollis kick), 14:53 (JAX 14–13)
- JAX – Mike Hollis 19-yard field goal, 9:55 (JAX 17–13)
- JAX – Mike Hollis 39-yard field goal, 2:48 (JAX 20–13)

Top passers

- SEA – Rick Mirer: 16/31, 156 yds, 1 TD, 1 INT
- JAX – Mark Brunell: 19/26, 231 yds, 2 TD

Top rushers

- SEA – Lamar Smith: 16 car, 59 yds
- JAX – Natrone Means: 23 car, 92 yds

Top receivers

- SEA – Carlester Crumpler: 6 rec, 58 yds
- JAX – Jimmy Smith: 8 rec, 124 yds, 2 TD

Team – pass – rush – total – to

- SEA – 147 – 159 – 306 – 1
- JAX – 218 – 133 – 351 – 0

==== Week 17: at Oakland Raiders ====
Week Seventeen: Seattle Seahawks at Oakland Raiders – Game summary

Quarter	1	2	3	4	Total
Seahawks	0	13	15	0	28
Raiders	8	6	7	0	21

at Oakland–Alameda County Coliseum, Oakland, California

- Date: December 22
- Game time: 1:05 pm local
- Game weather: cloudy, 57 °F (14 °C), 69% humidity, wind SW 28 miles per hour (45 km/h)
- Game attendance: 33,455
- Referee: Mike Carey
- TV announcers (NBC): Charlie Jones, Randy Cross
- Gamebook

Game information

First quarter

- OAK – Cole Ford 47-yard field goal, 9:35 (OAK 3–0)
- OAK – Safety, Dan Land tackled Jay Bellamy in end zone, 8:08 (OAK 5–0)
- OAK – Cole Ford 23-yard field goal, 5:42 (OAK 8–0)

Second quarter

- OAK – Cole Ford 28-yard field goal, 13:05 (OAK 11–0)
- SEA – Todd Peterson 19-yard field goal, 10:57 (OAK 11–3)
- OAK – Cole Ford 24-yard field goal, 1:12 (OAK 14–3)
- SEA – Lamar Smith 27-yard run (Todd Peterson kick), 0:55 (OAK 14–10)
- SEA – Todd Peterson 52-yard field goal, 0:00 (OAK 14–13)

Third quarter

- SEA – Joey Galloway 32-yard pass from Gino Torretta (2-pt PAT: Lamar Smith run), 13:52 (SEA 21–14)
- SEA – Lamar Smith 3-yard run (Todd Peterson kick), 7:57 (SEA 28–14)
- OAK – Derrick Fenner 2-yard run (Cole Ford kick), 0:00 (SEA 28–21)

Fourth quarter

- No scoring plays

Top passers

- SEA – Gino Torretta: 5/16, 41 yds, 1 TD, 1 INT
- OAK – Billy Joe Hobert: 12/23, 175 yds, 1 INT

Top rushers

- SEA – Lamar Smith: 25 car, 87 yds, 2 TD
- OAK – Napoleon Kaufman: 15 car, 66 yds

Top receivers

- SEA – Joey Galloway: 3 rec, 39 yds, 1 TD
- OAK – Tim Brown: 5 rec, 65 yds

Team – pass – rush – total – to

- SEA – 13 – 116 – 129 – 2
- OAK – 238 – 118 – 356 – 7
