= 1995 Seattle Seahawks season =

American football team season

- Owner: Ken Behring
- Head coach: Dennis Erickson
- Offensive coordinator: Bob Bratkowski
- Defensive coordinator: Greg McMackin
- Home stadium: Kingdome

Results
- Record: 8–8
- Division place: 3rd AFC West
- Playoffs: Did not qualify
- All-Pros: RB Chris Warren (2nd team)
- Pro Bowlers: RB Chris Warren; DT Cortez Kennedy

The 1995 Seattle Seahawks season was the franchise's 20th season in the National Football League (NFL), the 20th playing their home games at the Kingdome and the first under head coach Dennis Erickson. They were able to improve on their 6–10 record and finished the season 8–8, however missing the playoffs for the seventh consecutive season.

== Offseason ==
Additions	Subtractions
QB John Friesz (Redskins)	QB Dan McGwire (Dolphins)
WR Ricky Proehl (Cardinals)	K John Kasay (Panthers)
C Jim Sweeney (Jets)	C Ray Donaldson (Cowboys)
RB Steve Broussard (Bengals)	LB Rufus Porter (Saints)

=== 1995 expansion draft ===
Seattle Seahawks selected during the expansion draft
Round	Overall	Name	Position	Expansion team
4	8	Tyrone Rodgers	DE	Carolina Panthers
29	57	Kelvin Martin	WR	Jacksonville Jaguars

=== NFL draft ===
1995 Seattle Seahawks draft
Round	Pick	Player	Position	College	Notes
1	8	Joey Galloway	Wide receiver	Ohio State	
2	39	Christian Fauria	Tight end	Colorado	
4	126	Jason Kyle	Linebacker	Arizona State	
6	180	Henry McMillian	Defensive tackle	Florida	
6	203	Eddie Goines	Wide Receiver	NC State	
6	216	Keif Bryant	Defensive Tackle	Rutgers	
Made roster

=== Undrafted free agents ===
1995 undrafted free agents of note
Player	Position	College
Ernest Allen	Defensive tackle	Cincinnati
Kelvin Anderson	Running back	Southeast Missouri State
Robert Baldwin	Fullback	Duke
Mike Barber	Linebacker	Clemson
Jerrick Bledsoe	Cornerback	Texas Southern
Judd Davis	Kicker	Florida
Bryan Heath	Center	Virginia
James McKeehan	Tight end	Texas A&M
DeWayne Patterson	Defensive end	Washington State
Joe Pickens	Quarterback	Duke
Kris Pollack	Guard	USC
Anthony Shelman	Running back	Louisville
Donald Willis	Guard	North Carolina A&T
Chad Wilson	Cornerback	Miami (FL)
Manley Woods	Wide receiver	New Mexico

== Personnel ==
=== Staff ===
1995 Seattle Seahawks staff
**Front office**: Owner – Ken Behring; President – David Behring; Executive vice president – Mickey Loomis; Vice president of football operations – Randy Mueller; Player personnel director – Mike Allman; Assistant player personnel director – Rick Thompson; College scouting director – Phil Neri; **Head coaches**: Head coach – Dennis Erickson; Assistant head coach/tight ends – Gregg Smith; **Offensive coaches**: Offensive coordinator/wide receivers – Bob Bratkowski; Quarterbacks – Rich Olson; Running backs – Clarence Shelmon; Offensive line – Howard Mudd; Offensive staff assistant – Ned James	**Defensive coaches**: Defensive coordinator – Greg McMackin; Defensive line – Tommy Brasher; Linebackers – Mike Murphy; Defensive backs – Willy Robinson; Defensive – Dave Brown; Defensive staff assistant – Arnie Matsumoto; Quality control – Tom Catlin; **Special teams coaches**: Special teams – Dave Arnold; **Strength and conditioning**: Strength and conditioning – Dana LeDuc

=== Final roster ===
1995 Seattle Seahawks roster
**Quarterbacks (QB)**: 17 John Friesz; 8 Stan Gelbaugh; 3 Rick Mirer; **Running backs (RB)**: 31 Steve Broussard; 43 Tracy Johnson; 36 Lamar Smith; 35 Steve Smith FB; 38 Mack Strong FB; 42 Chris Warren; **Wide receivers (WR)**: 89 Brian Blades; 84 Joey Galloway; 81 Ronnie Harris; 82 James McKnight; 88 Ricky Proehl; 86 Robb Thomas; **Tight ends (TE)**: 87 Carlester Crumpler; 85 Christian Fauria	**Offensive linemen (OL)**: 74 James Atkins T; 75 Howard Ballard T; 69 Jeff Blackshear G; 77 Matt Joyce G; 78 Mike Keim T; 52 Kevin Mawae G; 66 Todd Norman G; 73 Ray Roberts T; 53 Jim Sweeney C; **Defensive linemen (DL)**: 98 Sam Adams DT; 94 Antonio Edwards DE; 96 Cortez Kennedy DT; 99 Michael McCrary DE; 92 Henry McMillian DT; 72 Joe Nash DT; 70 Michael Sinclair DE; 93 Brent Williams DE	**Linebackers (LB)**: 54 Mike Barber MLB; 50 Duane Bickett OLB; 57 Jason Kyle OLB; 56 James Logan OLB; 55 Winston Moss OLB; 95 Dean Wells MLB; 90 Terry Wooden OLB; **Defensive backs (DB)**: 20 Jay Bellamy FS; 25 Robert Blackmon SS; 29 Tony Brown CB; 27 Tony Covington SS; 26 Carlton Gray CB; 30 Corey Harris CB; 24 Selwyn Jones CB; 41 Eugene Robinson FS; 21 Rafael Robinson SS; **Special teams (ST)**: 83 Trey Junkin LS; 2 Todd Peterson K; 14 Rick Tuten P	**Practice squad**: 68 Keif Bryant DT; 71 Kelvin Ingram T; 23 Dexter Seigler CB; 51 John Solomon LB; 15 Manley Woods WR; **Reserve**: 19 Eddie Goines WR (IR); 37 Nate Odomes CB (IR); 58 Bob Spitulski LB (IR); 59 Tyronne Stowe LB (IR); Rookies in italics 53 active, 4 reserve, 5 practice squad

- Starters in bold.
- (*) Denotes players that were selected for the 1996 Pro Bowl.

== Schedule ==
=== Preseason ===
Week	Date	Opponent	Result	Record	Venue	Recap
1	August 5	St. Louis Rams	**W** 34–20	1–0	Kingdome	Recap
2	August 12	Indianapolis Colts	**L** 17–20	1–1	Kingdome	Recap
3	August 20	at New Orleans Saints	**W** 24–19	2–1	Louisiana Superdome	Recap
4	August 26	at San Francisco 49ers	**L** 7–17	2–2	3Com Park	Recap

Source: Seahawks Media Guides

=== Regular season ===
Week	Date	Opponent	Result	Record	Venue	Recap
1	September 3	**Kansas City Chiefs**	**L** 10–34	0–1	Kingdome	Recap
2	September 10	at **San Diego Chargers**	**L** 10–14	0–2	Jack Murphy Stadium	Recap
3	September 17	Cincinnati Bengals	**W** 24–21	1–2	Kingdome	Recap
4	Bye					
5	October 1	**Denver Broncos**	**W** 27–10	2–2	Kingdome	Recap
6	October 8	at **Oakland Raiders**	**L** 14–34	2–3	Oakland–Alameda County Coliseum	Recap
7	October 15	at Buffalo Bills	**L** 21–27	2–4	Rich Stadium	Recap
8	October 22	**San Diego Chargers**	**L** 25–35	2–5	Kingdome	Recap
9	October 29	at Arizona Cardinals	**L** 14–20 (OT)	2–6	Sun Devil Stadium	Recap
10	November 5	New York Giants	**W** 30–28	3–6	Kingdome	Recap
11	November 12	at Jacksonville Jaguars	**W** 47–30	4–6	Jacksonville Municipal Stadium	Recap
12	November 19	at Washington Redskins	**W** 27–20	5–6	RFK Stadium	Recap
13	November 26	New York Jets	**L** 10–16	5–7	Kingdome	Recap
14	December 3	Philadelphia Eagles	**W** 26–14	6–7	Kingdome	Recap
15	December 10	at **Denver Broncos**	**W** 31–27	7–7	Mile High Stadium	Recap
16	December 17	**Oakland Raiders**	**W** 44–10	8–7	Kingdome	Recap
17	December 24	at **Kansas City Chiefs**	**L** 3–26	8–8	Arrowhead Stadium	Recap
Note: Intra-division opponents are in **bold** text.

Source: 1995 NFL season results

== Standings ==
AFC West
	W	L	T	PCT	PF	PA	STK
^{(1)} Kansas City Chiefs	13	3	0	.813	358	241	W2
^{(4)} San Diego Chargers	9	7	0	.563	321	323	W5
Seattle Seahawks	8	8	0	.500	363	366	L1
Denver Broncos	8	8	0	.500	388	345	W1
Oakland Raiders	8	8	0	.500	348	332	L6

== Game summaries ==
=== Preseason ===
==== Week P1: vs. St. Louis Rams ====
Preseason Week One: Seattle Seahawks vs. St. Louis Rams – Game summary

Quarter	1	2	3	4	Total
Rams	3	7	3	7	20
Seahawks	10	10	7	7	34

at Kingdome, Seattle

- Date: August 5
- Game time: 7:06 pm local
- Game weather: indoors
- Game attendance: 35,607
- Referee: Phil Luckett
- TV: KING
- Gamebook

==== Week P2: vs. Indianapolis Colts ====
Preseason Week Two: Seattle Seahawks vs. Indianapolis Colts – Game summary

Quarter	1	2	3	4	Total
Colts	3	0	7	10	20
Seahawks	0	0	3	14	17

at Kingdome, Seattle

- Date: August 12
- Game time: 7:05 pm local
- Game weather: indoors
- Game attendance: 38,006
- Referee: Jerry Markbreit
- TV: KING
- Gamebook

==== Week P3: at New Orleans Saints ====
Preseason Week Three: Seattle Seahawks at New Orleans Saints – Game summary

Quarter	1	2	3	4	Total
Seahawks	7	10	0	7	24
Saints	6	7	0	6	19

at Superdome, New Orleans, Louisiana

- Date: August 20
- Game time: 12:07 pm local
- Game weather: indoors
- Game attendance: 38,228
- Referee: Mike Carey
- TV: KING
- Gamebook

==== Week P4: at San Francisco 49ers ====
Preseason Week Four: Seattle Seahawks at San Francisco 49ers – Game summary

Quarter	1	2	3	4	Total
Seahawks	0	7	0	0	7
49ers	10	0	0	7	17

at Candlestick Park, San Francisco

- Date: August 26
- Game time: 5:06 pm local
- Game weather: clear, 67 °F (19 °C), 49% humidity, wind NW 20 miles per hour (32 km/h)
- Game attendance: 53,280
- Referee: Ron Blum
- TV: Fox
- Gamebook

=== Regular season ===
==== Week 1: vs. Kansas City Chiefs ====
Week One: Seattle Seahawks vs. Kansas City Chiefs – Game summary

Quarter	1	2	3	4	Total
Chiefs	7	13	14	0	34
Seahawks	3	0	0	7	10

at Kingdome, Seattle

- Date: September 3
- Game time: 1:05 pm local
- Game weather: indoors
- Game attendance: 47,564
- Referee: Howard Roe
- TV announcers (NBC): Jim Lampley, Bob Golic
- Gamebook

Game information

First quarter

- SEA – Todd Peterson 49-yard field goal, 10:56 (SEA 3–0)
- KC – Willie Davis 60-yard pass from Steve Bono (Lin Elliott kick), 4:00 (KC 7–3)

Second quarter

- KC – Lin Elliott 46-yard field goal, 10:25 (KC 10–3)
- KC – Willie Davis 40-yard pass from Steve Bono (Lin Elliott kick), 6:40 (KC 17–3)
- KC – Lin Elliott 49-yard field goal, 0:00 (KC 20–3)

Third quarter

- KC – Tamarick Vanover 99-yard kickoff return (Lin Elliott kick), 14:43 (KC 27–3)
- KC – Lake Dawson 16-yard pass from Steve Bono (Lin Elliott kick), 6:18 (KC 34–3)

Fourth quarter

- SEA – Brian Blades 21-yard pass from John Friesz (Todd Peterson kick), 2:52 (KC 34–10)

Top passers

- KC – Steve Bono: 18/23, 278 yds, 3 TD
- SEA – Rick Mirer: 19/37, 209 yds, 1 INT

Top rushers

- KC – Greg Hill: 15 car, 109 yds
- SEA – Chris Warren: 14 car, 56 yds

Top receivers

- KC – Willie Davis: 6 rec, 155 yds, 2 TD
- SEA – Brian Blades: 8 rec, 107 yds, 1 TD

Team – pass – rush – total – to

- KC – 278 – 141 – 419 – 0
- SEA – 264 – 78 – 342 – 2

==== Week 2: at San Diego Chargers ====
Week Two: Seattle Seahawks at San Diego Chargers – Game summary

Quarter	1	2	3	4	Total
Seahawks	0	7	3	0	10
Chargers	7	0	0	7	14

at San Diego Stadium, San Diego, California

- Date: September 10
- Game time: 1:01 pm local
- Game weather: clear, 76 °F (24 °C), 71% humidity, wind WSW 11 miles per hour (18 km/h)
- Game attendance: 54,420
- Referee: Walt Coleman
- TV announcers (NBC): Jim Lampley, Bob Golic
- Gamebook

Game information

First quarter

- SD – Tony Martin 5-yard pass from Stan Humphries (John Carney kick), 8:37 (SD 7–0)

Second quarter

- SEA – Christian Fauria 20-yard pass from Rick Mirer (Todd Peterson kick), 10:31 (Tied 7–7)

Third quarter

- SEA – Todd Peterson 23-yard field goal, 10:29 (SEA 10–7)

Fourth quarter

- SD – Ronnie Harmon 15-yard pass from Stan Humphries (John Carney kick), 13:41 (SD 14–10)

Top passers

- SEA – Rick Mirer: 13/29, 127 yds, 1 TD, 2 INT
- SD – Stan Humphries: 23/35, 260 yds, 2 TD, 1 INT

Top rushers

- SEA – Chris Warren: 16 car, 56 yds
- SD – Natrone Means: 26 car, 115 yds

Top receivers

- SEA – Christian Fauria: 4 rec, 41 yds, 1 TD
- SD – Tony Martin: 13 rec, 163 yds, 1 TD

Team – pass – rush – total – to

- SEA – 127 – 82 – 209 – 2
- SD – 251 – 146 – 397 – 2

==== Week 3: vs. Cincinnati Bengals ====
Week Three: Seattle Seahawks vs. Cincinnati Bengals – Game summary

Quarter	1	2	3	4	Total
Bengals	7	0	0	14	21
Seahawks	7	10	0	7	24

at Kingdome, Seattle

- Date: September 17
- Game time: 1:04 pm local
- Game weather: indoors
- Game attendance: 39,492
- Referee: Mike Carey
- TV announcers (NBC): Dan Hicks, Tunch Ilkin
- Gamebook

Game information

First quarter

- SEA – Steve Smith 5-yard pass from Rick Mirer (Todd Peterson kick), 10:37 (SEA 7–0)
- CIN – Darnay Scott 88-yard pass from Jeff Blake (Doug Pelfrey kick), 5:46 (Tied 7–7)

Second quarter

- SEA – Robb Thomas 50-yard pass from Rick Mirer (Todd Peterson kick), 1:10 (SEA 14–7)
- SEA – Todd Peterson 38-yard field goal, 0:00 (SEA 17–7)

Third quarter

- No scoring plays

Fourth quarter

- CIN – Roger Jones 17-yard interception return (Doug Pelfrey kick), 12:41 (SEA 17–14)
- SEA – Chris Warren 11-yard run (Todd Peterson kick), 6:44 (SEA 24–17)
- CIN – Carl Pickens 22-yard pass from Jeff Blake (Doug Pelfrey kick), 3:18 (SEA 24–21)

Top passers

- CIN – Jeff Blake: 22/42, 286 yds, 2 TD, 1 INT
- SEA – Rick Mirer: 21/30, 279 yds, 2 TD, 1 INT

Top rushers

- CIN – Jeff Blake: 5 car, 56 yds
- SEA – Chris Warren: 24 car, 109 yds, 1 TD

Top receivers

- CIN – Darnay Scott: 3 rec, 98 yds, 1 TD
- SEA – Joey Galloway: 6 rec, 78 yds

Team – pass – rush – total – to

- CIN – 291 – 110 – 401 – 1
- SEA –263 – 143 – 406 – 1

==== Week 5: vs. Denver Broncos ====
Week Five: Seattle Seahawks vs. Denver Broncos – Game summary

Quarter	1	2	3	4	Total
Broncos	0	0	3	7	10
Seahawks	0	10	7	10	27

at Kingdome, Seattle

- Date: October 1
- Game time: 1:05 pm local
- Game weather: indoors
- Game attendance: 49,914
- Referee: Dick Hantak
- TV announcers (NBC): Dan Hicks, Randy Cross
- Gamebook

Game information

First quarter

- No scoring plays

Second quarter

- SEA – Chris Warren 1-yard run (Todd Peterson kick), 1:42 (SEA 7–0)
- SEA – Todd Peterson 45-yard field goal, 0:02 (SEA 10–0)

Third quarter

- SEA – Chris Warren 4-yard run (Todd Peterson kick), 7:38 (SEA 17–0)
- DEN – Jason Elam 30-yard field goal, 2:35 (SEA 17–3)

Fourth quarter

- SEA – Chris Warren 4-yard run (Todd Peterson kick), 10:50 (SEA 24–3)
- DEN – Shannon Sharpe 26-yard pass from John Elway (Jason Elam kick), 7:48 (SEA 24–10)
- SEA – Todd Peterson 19-yard field goal, 1:56 (SEA 27–10)

Top passers

- DEN – John Elway: 19/37, 209 yds, 1 TD
- SEA – Rick Mirer: 16/24, 222 yds

Top rushers

- DEN – Terrell Davis: 15 car, 61 yds
- SEA – Chris Warren: 24 car, 115 yds, 3 TD

Top receivers

- DEN – Shannon Sharpe: 8 rec, 94 yds
- SEA – Joey Galloway: 4 rec, 89 yds

Team – pass – rush – total – to

- DEN – 243 – 75 – 318 – 1
- SEA – 192 – 230 – 422 – 0

==== Week 6: at Oakland Raiders ====
Week Six: Seattle Seahawks at Oakland Raiders – Game summary

Quarter	1	2	3	4	Total
Seahawks	0	0	7	7	14
Raiders	3	10	14	7	34

at Oakland–Alameda County Coliseum, Oakland, California

- Date: October 8
- Game time: 1:06 pm local
- Game weather: clear, 61 °F (16 °C), 75% humidity, wind W 10 miles per hour (16 km/h)
- Game attendance: 50,213
- Referee: Ron Blum
- TV announcers (NBC): Jim Lampley, Bob Golic
- Gamebook

Game information

First quarter

- OAK – Jeff Jaeger 37-yard field goal, 1:39 (OAK 3–0)

Second quarter

- OAK – Jeff Jaeger 24-yard field goal, 7:18 (OAK 6–0)
- OAK – Tim Brown 80-yard pass from Jeff Hostetler (Jeff Jaeger kick), 0:44 (OAK 13–0)

Third quarter

- SEA – Steve Broussard 21-yard run (Todd Peterson kick), 11:00 (OAK 13–7)
- OAK – Harvey Williams 25-yard run (Jeff Jaeger kick), 8:54 (OAK 20–7)
- OAK – Andrew Glover 13-yard pass from Harvey Williams (Jeff Jaeger kick), 1:52 (OAK 27–7)

Fourth quarter

- OAK – Kerry Cash 16-yard pass from Jeff Hostetler (Jeff Jaeger kick), 13:51 (OAK 34–7)
- SEA – Joey Galloway 35-yard pass from Rick Mirer (Todd Peterson kick), 12:06 (OAK 34–14)

Top passers

- SEA – Rick Mirer: 15/33, 236 yds, 1 TD, 2 INT
- OAK – Jeff Hostetler: 20/33, 333 yds, 2 TD

Top rushers

- SEA – Chris Warren: 16 car, 57 yds
- OAK – Harvey Williams: 19 car, 160 yds, 1 TD

Top receivers

- SEA – Joey Galloway: 4 rec, 87 yds, 1 TD
- OAK – Tim Brown: 5 rec, 143 yds, 1 TD

Team – pass – rush – total – to

- SEA – 227 – 116 – 343 – 2
- OAK – 335 – 195 – 530 – 0

==== Week 7: at Buffalo Bills ====
Week Seven: Seattle Seahawks at Buffalo Bills – Game summary

Quarter	1	2	3	4	Total
Seahawks	0	7	7	7	21
Bills	0	10	14	3	27

at Ralph Wilson Stadium, Orchard Park, New York

- Date: October 15
- Game time: 1:01 pm local
- Game weather: partly cloudy, 52 °F (11 °C), 46% humidity, wind W 29 miles per hour (47 km/h)
- Game attendance: 74,362
- Referee: Tom White
- TV announcers (NBC): Jim Lampley, Bob Golic
- Gamebook

Game information

First quarter

- No scoring plays

Second quarter

- SEA – Chris Warren 3-yard run (Todd Peterson kick), 12:43 (SEA 7–0)
- BUF – Bill Brooks 28-yard pass from Jim Kelly (Steve Christie kick), 5:38 (Tied 7–7)
- BUF – Steve Christie 43-yard field goal, 4:12 (BUF 10–7)

Third quarter

- BUF – Lonnie Johnson 2-yard pass from Jim Kelly (Steve Christie kick), 7:53 (BUF 17–7)
- BUF – Bill Brooks 30-yard pass from Jim Kelly (Steve Christie kick), 5:51 (BUF 24–7)
- SEA – Joey Galloway 54-yard pass from Rick Mirer (Todd Peterson kick), 4:49 (BUF 24–14)

Fourth quarter

- BUF – Steve Christie 26-yard field goal, 12:48 (BUF 27–14)
- SEA – Chris Warren 4-yard run (Todd Peterson kick), 4:17 (BUF 27–21)

Top passers

- SEA – Rick Mirer: 15/34, 218 yds, 1 TD, 3 INT
- BUF – Jim Kelly: 21/36, 275 yds, 3 TD

Top rushers

- SEA – Chris Warren: 23 car, 64 yds, 2 TD
- BUF – Thurman Thomas: 24 car, 51 yds

Top receivers

- SEA – Joey Galloway: 5 rec, 102 yds, 1 TD
- BUF – Bill Brooks: 6 rec, 109 yds, 2 TD

Team – pass – rush – total – to

- SEA – 190 – 78 – 268 – 4
- BUF – 259 – 115 – 374 – 0

==== Week 8: vs. San Diego Chargers ====
Week Eight: Seattle Seahawks vs. San Diego Chargers – Game summary

Quarter	1	2	3	4	Total
Chargers	6	19	0	10	35
Seahawks	7	3	6	9	25

at Kingdome, Seattle

- Date: October 22
- Game time: 1:05 pm local
- Game weather: indoors
- Game attendance: 45,821
- Referee: Jerry Markbreit
- TV announcers (NBC): Jim Lampley, Bob Golic
- Gamebook

Game information

First quarter

- SEA – Brian Blades 41-yard pass from Rick Mirer (Todd Peterson kick), 7:04 (SEA 7–0)
- SD – Ronnie Harmon 12-yard pass from Stan Humphries (PAT failed), 3:13 (SEA 7–6)

Second quarter

- SD – Mark Seay 2-yard pass from Stan Humphries (PAT failed), 11:42 (SD 12–7)
- SD – Shaun Gayle recovered fumble in end zone (PAT failed), 8:32 (SD 18–7)
- SEA – Todd Peterson 48-yard field goal, 4:44 (SD 18–10)
- SD – Natrone Means 7-yard run (John Carney kick), 1:54 (SD 25–10)

Third quarter

- SEA – Chris Warren 1-yard run (PAT failed), 9:25 (SD 25–16)

Fourth quarter

- SD – Ronnie Harmon 23-yard pass from Stan Humphries (John Carney kick), 14:24 (SD 32–16)
- SEA – Todd Peterson 27-yard field goal, 10:30 (SD 32–19)
- SD – John Carney 25-yard field goal, 5:09 (SD 35–19)
- SEA – Chris Warren 6-yard run (PAT failed), 2:53 (SD 35–25)

Top passers

- SD – Stan Humphries: 14/26, 166 yds, 3 TD, 1 INT
- SEA – Rick Mirer: 17/26, 216 yds, 1 TD, 3 INT

Top rushers

- SD – Natrone Means: 26 car, 91 yds, 1 TD
- SEA – Chris Warren: 18 car, 112 yds, 2 TD

Top receivers

- SD – Ronnie Harmon: 3 rec, 40 yds, 2 TD
- SEA – Chris Warren: 4 rec, 45 yds

Team – pass – rush – total – to

- SD – 146 – 153 – 299 – 1
- SEA – 233 – 150 – 383 – 4

==== Week 9: at Arizona Cardinals ====
Week Nine: Seattle Seahawks at Arizona Cardinals – Game summary

Quarter	1	2	3	4	OT	Total
Seahawks	0	0	7	7	0	14
Cardinals	14	0	0	0	6	20

at Sun Devil Stadium, Tempe, Arizona

- Date: October 29
- Game time: 2:05 pm local
- Game weather: clear, 82 °F (28 °C), 16% humidity, wind E 6 miles per hour (9.7 km/h)
- Game attendance: 39,600
- Referee: Red Cashion
- TV announcers (NBC): Jim Lampley, Bob Golic
- Gamebook

Game information

First quarter

- ARI – Rob Moore 8-yard pass from Dave Krieg (Greg Davis kick), 8:06 (ARI 7–0)
- ARI – Keith McCants 5-yard fumble return (Greg Davis kick), 4:31 (ARI 14–0)

Second quarter

- No scoring plays

Third quarter

- SEA – Mack Strong 17-yard pass from John Friesz (Todd Peterson kick), 7:52 (ARI 14–7)

Fourth quarter

- SEA – Mack Strong 2-yard pass from John Friesz (Todd Peterson kick), 11:08 (Tied 14–14)

Overtime

- ARI – Lorenzo Lynch 72-yard interception return, 3:44 (ARI 20–14)

Top passers

- SEA – John Friesz: 17/32, 205 yds, 2 TD, 2 INT
- ARI – Dave Krieg: 23/45, 200 yds, 1 TD, 2 INT

Top rushers

- SEA – Chris Warren: 23 car, 127 yds
- ARI – Garrison Hearst: 21 car, 54 yds

Top receivers

- SEA – Brian Blades: 5 rec, 69 yds
- ARI – Rob Moore: 6 rec, 77 yds, 1 TD

Team – pass – rush – total – to

- SEA – 198 – 230 – 428 – 7
- ARI – 190 – 115 – 305 – 4

==== Week 10: vs. New York Giants ====
Week Ten: Seattle Seahawks vs. New York Giants – Game summary

Quarter	1	2	3	4	Total
Giants	3	19	0	6	28
Seahawks	21	0	3	6	30

at Kingdome, Seattle

- Date: November 5
- Game time: 1:05 pm local
- Game weather: indoors
- Game attendance: 42,100
- Referee: Ed Hochuli
- TV announcers (Fox): Joe Buck & Tim Green
- Gamebook

Game information

First quarter

- SEA – Brian Blades 33-yard pass from Rick Mirer (Todd Peterson kick), 10:00 (SEA 7–0)
- NYG – Brad Daluiso 23-yard field goal, 6:16 (SEA 7–3)
- SEA – Brian Blades 44-yard pass from Rick Mirer (Todd Peterson kick), 4:11 (SEA 14–3)
- SEA – Joey Galloway 89-yard punt return (Todd Peterson kick), 0:39 (SEA 21–3)

Second quarter

- NYG – Herschel Walker 8-yard pass from Dave Brown (Brad Daluiso kick), 11:40 (SEA 21–10)
- NYG – Mike Sherrard 28-yard pass from Dave Brown (PAT failed), 1:55 (SEA 21–16)
- NYG – Rodney Hampton 1-yard run (PAT failed), 0:32 (NYG 22–21)

Third quarter

- SEA – Todd Peterson 23-yard field goal, 10:30 (SEA 24–22)

Fourth quarter

- SEA – Todd Peterson 41-yard field goal, 13:33 (SEA 27–22)
- NYG – Rodney Hampton 1-yard run (PAT failed), 8:15 (NYG 28–29)
- SEA – Todd Peterson 32-yard field goal, 1:27 (SEA 30–28)

Top passers

- NYG – Dave Brown: 20/41, 299 yds, 2 TD
- SEA – Rick Mirer: 17/31, 253 yds, 2 TD, 1 INT

Top rushers

- NYG – Rodney Hampton: 18 car, 54 yds, 2 TD
- SEA – Lamar Smith: 19 car, 84 yds

Top receivers

- NYG – Mike Sherrard: 6 rec, 128 yds, 1 TD
- SEA – Brian Blades: 6 rec, 153 yds, 2 TD

Team – pass – rush – total – to

- NYG – 286 – 117 – 403– 0
- SEA – 248 – 138 – 386 – 2

==== Week 11: at Jacksonville Jaguars ====
Week Eleven: Seattle Seahawks at Jacksonville Jaguars – Game summary

Quarter	1	2	3	4	Total
Seahawks	14	7	7	19	47
Jaguars	7	20	0	3	30

at Jacksonville Municipal Stadium, Jacksonville, Florida

- Date: November 12
- Game time: 1:03 pm local
- Game weather: clear, 52 °F (11 °C), 44% humidity, wind NE 5 miles per hour (8.0 km/h)
- Game attendance: 71,290
- Referee: Walt Coleman
- TV announcers (NBC): Don Criqui, Beasley Reece
- Gamebook

Game information

First quarter

- SEA – Chris Warren 29-yard run (Todd Peterson kick), 10:11 (SEA 7–0)
- JAX – Mark Brunell 3-yard run (Mike Hollis kick), 6:30 (Tied 7–7)
- SEA – Joey Galloway 38-yard pass from Rick Mirer (Todd Peterson kick), 0:00 (SEA 14–7)

Second quarter

- JAX – Vaughn Dunbar 2-yard run (Mike Hollis kick), 12:13 (Tied 14–14)
- SEA – Joey Galloway 86-yard run (Todd Peterson kick), 10:56 (SEA 21–14)
- JAX – Ernest Givins 15-yard pass from Mark Brunell (Mike Hollis kick), 7:02 (Tied 21–21)
- JAX – Mike Hollis 26-yard field goal, 1:22 (JAX 24–21)
- JAX – Mike Hollis 50-yard field goal, 0:00 (JAX 27–21)

Third quarter

- SEA – Joey Galloway 23-yard pass from Rick Mirer (Todd Peterson kick), 10:57 (SEA 28–27)

Fourth quarter

- SEA – Mack Strong 4-yard run (Todd Peterson kick), 13:47 (SEA 35–27)
- JAX – Mike Hollis 29-yard field goal, 10:37 (SEA 35–30)
- SEA – Todd Peterson 25-yard field goal, 4:18 (SEA 38–30)
- SEA – Tracy Johnson 2-yard run (Todd Peterson kick), 1:03 (SEA 45–30)
- SEA – Safety, Sam Adams tackled Mark Brunell in end zone, 0:50 (SEA 47–30)

Top passers

- SEA – Rick Mirer: 18/31, 244 yds, 2 TD, 1 INT
- JAX – Mark Brunell: 13/20, 121 yds, 1 TD, 1 INT

Top rushers

- SEA – Chris Warren: 27 car, 121 yds, 1 TD
- JAX – Mark Brunell: 6 car, 60 yds, 1 TD

Top receivers

- SEA – Joey Galloway: 5 rec, 114 yds, 2 TD
- JAX – Ernest Givins: 5 rec, 46 yds, 1 TD

Team – pass – rush – total – to

- SEA – 235 – 246 – 481 – 1
- JAX – 105 – 161 – 266 – 2

==== Week 12: at Washington Redskins ====
Week Twelve: Seattle Seahawks at Washington Redskins – Game summary

Quarter	1	2	3	4	Total
Seahawks	3	7	7	10	27
Redskins	3	7	0	10	20

at RFK Stadium, Washington, D.C.

- Date: November 19
- Game time: 1:01 pm local
- Game weather: clear, 49 °F (9 °C), 74% humidity, wind N 12 miles per hour (19 km/h)
- Game attendance: 51,298
- Referee: Mike Carey
- TV announcers (NBC): Tom Hammond, Bob Trumpy
- Gamebook

Game information

First quarter

- SEA – Todd Peterson 39-yard field goal, 10:52 (SEA 3–0)
- WAS – Eddie Murray 18-yard field goal, 0:54 (Tied 3–3)

Second quarter

- SEA – Joey Galloway 59-yard pass from Rick Mirer (Todd Peterson kick), 14:20 (SEA 10–3)
- WAS – Olanda Truitt 18-yard pass from Gus Frerotte (Eddie Murray kick), 9:58 (Tied 10–10)

Third quarter

- SEA – Carlester Crumpler 10-yard pass from Rick Mirer (Todd Peterson kick), 5:33 (SEA 17–10)

Fourth quarter

- WAS – Eddie Murray 48-yard field goal, 12:19 (SEA 17–13)
- SEA – Chris Warren 5-yard run (Todd Peterson kick), 7:46 (SEA 24–13)
- SEA – Todd Peterson 47-yard field goal, 3:16 (SEA 27–13)
- WAS – Michael Westbrook 5-yard pass from Heath Shuler (Eddie Murray kick), 1:18 (SEA 27–20)

Top passers

- SEA – Rick Mirer: 18/32, 185 yds, 2 TD, 2 INT
- WAS – Gus Frerotte: 14/32, 200 yds, 1 TD, 2 INT

Top rushers

- SEA – Chris Warren: 29 car, 136 yds, 1 TD
- WAS – Terry Allen: 15 car, 41 yds

Top receivers

- SEA – Joey Galloway: 4 rec, 90 yds, 1 TD
- WAS – Brian Mitchell: 7 rec, 68 yds

Team – pass – rush – total – to

- SEA – 173 – 167 – 340 – 2
- WAS – 281 – 67 – 348 – 5

==== Week 13: vs. New York Jets ====
Week Thirteen: Seattle Seahawks vs. New York Jets – Game summary

Quarter	1	2	3	4	Total
Jets	7	6	0	3	16
Seahawks	0	0	10	0	10

at Kingdome, Seattle

- Date: November 26
- Game time: 1:05 pm local
- Game weather: indoors
- Game attendance: 41,160
- Referee: Bernie Kukar
- TV announcers (NBC): Charlie Jones, Randy Cross
- Gamebook

Game information

First quarter

- NYJ – Adrian Murrell 2-yard run (Nick Lowery kick), 11:58 (NYJ 7–0)

Second quarter

- NYJ – Nick Lowery 38-yard field goal, 11:01 (NYJ 10–0)
- NYJ – Nick Lowery 33-yard field goal, 0:39 (NYJ 13–0)

Third quarter

- SEA – Mack Strong 6-yard pass from Rick Mirer (Todd Peterson kick), 8:26 (NYJ 13–7)
- SEA – Todd Peterson 42-yard field goal, 6:03 (NYJ 13–10)

Fourth quarter

- NYJ – Nick Lowery 41-yard field goal, 6:15 (NYJ 16–10)

Top passers

- NYJ – Boomer Esiason: 19/34, 149 yds, 1 INT
- SEA – Rick Mirer: 17/34, 138 yds, 1 TD, 1 INT

Top rushers

- NYJ – Adrian Murrell: 24 car, 116 yds, 1 TD
- SEA – Chris Warren: 16 car, 63 yds

Top receivers

- NYJ – Johnny Mitchell: 5 rec, 50 yds
- SEA – Brian Blades: 6 rec, 43 yds

Team – pass – rush – total – to

- NYJ – 143 – 112 – 255 – 1
- SEA – 118 – 74 – 192 – 3

==== Week 14: vs. Philadelphia Eagles ====
Week Fourteen: Seattle Seahawks vs. Philadelphia Eagles – Game summary

Quarter	1	2	3	4	Total
Eagles	0	7	0	7	14
Seahawks	7	10	3	6	26

at Kingdome, Seattle

- Date: December 3
- Game time: 1:04 pm local
- Game weather: indoors
- Game attendance: 39,893
- Referee: Gerry Austin
- TV announcers (Fox): Kenny Albert, Anthony Muñoz
- Gamebook

Game information

First quarter

- SEA – Chris Warren 5-yard run (Todd Peterson kick), 3:34 (SEA 7–0)

Second quarter

- SEA – Rick Mirer 12-yard run (Todd Peterson kick), 13:05 (SEA 14–0)
- PHI – Ricky Watters 1-yard run (Gary Anderson kick), 1:14 (SEA 14–7)
- SEA – Todd Peterson 47-yard field goal, 0:00 (SEA 17–7)

Third quarter

- SEA – Todd Peterson 35-yard field goal, 2:06 (SEA 20–7)

Fourth quarter

- PHI – Ricky Watters 1-yard run (Gary Anderson kick), 13:43 (SEA 20–14)
- SEA – Todd Peterson 37-yard field goal, 9:09 (SEA 23–14)
- SEA – Todd Peterson 45-yard field goal, 3:55 (SEA 26–14)

Top passers

- PHI – Rodney Peete: 19/36, 200 yds, 1 INT
- SEA – Rick Mirer: 17/30, 169 yds

Top rushers

- PHI – Ricky Watters: 21 car, 69 yds, 2 TD
- SEA – Chris Warren: 27 car, 93 yds, 1 TD

Top receivers

- PHI – Rob Carpenter: 4 rec, 57 yds
- SEA – Brian Blades: 6 rec, 71 yds

Team – pass – rush – total – to

- PHI – 200 – 69 – 269 – 1
- SEA – 149 – 167 – 316 – 0

==== Week 15 at Denver Broncos ====
Week Fifteen: Seattle Seahawks at Denver Broncos – Game summary

Quarter	1	2	3	4	Total
Seahawks	0	3	7	21	31
Broncos	10	10	0	7	27

at Mile High Stadium, Denver, Colorado

- Date: December 10
- Game time: 1:00 pm local
- Game weather: cloudy, 56 °F (13 °C), 26% humidity, wind NW 13 miles per hour (21 km/h)
- Game attendance: 71,488
- Referee: Gary Lane
- TV announcers (NBC): Jim Lampley, Bob Golic
- Gamebook

Game information

First quarter

- DEN – Aaron Craver 2-yard run (Jason Elam kick), 11:08 (DEN 7–0)
- DEN – Jason Elam 29-yard field goal, 3:19 (DEN 10–0)

Second quarter

- DEN – Anthony Miller 15-yard pass from John Elway (Jason Elam kick), 12:46 (DEN 17–0)
- DEN – Jason Elam 46-yard field goal, 5:00 (DEN 20–0)
- SEA – Todd Peterson 36-yard field goal, 1:15 (DEN 20–3)

Third quarter

- SEA – Antonio Edwards 83-yard fumble return (Todd Peterson kick), 9:09 (DEN 20–10)

Fourth quarter

- SEA – Chris Warren 24-yard run (Todd Peterson kick), 11:06 (DEN 20–17)
- DEN – John Elway 1-yard run (Jason Elam kick), 7:16 (DEN 27–17)
- SEA – Joey Galloway 5-yard pass from John Friesz (Todd Peterson kick), 4:10 (DEN 27–24)
- SEA – Chris Warren 20-yard pass from John Friesz (Todd Peterson kick), 0:49 (SEA 31–27)

Top passers

- SEA – John Friesz: 12/23, 157 yds, 2 TD, 1 INT
- DEN – John Elway: 16/29, 174 yds, 1 TD, 3 INT

Top rushers

- SEA – Chris Warren: 18 car, 101 yds, 1 TD
- DEN – Glyn Milburn: 18 car, 131 yds

Top receivers

- SEA – Brian Blades: 7 rec, 127 yds
- DEN – Anthony Miller: 4 rec, 57 yds, 1 TD

Team – pass – rush – total – to

- SEA – 192 – 134 – 326 – 2
- DEN – 148 – 240 – 388 – 5

==== Week 16: vs. Oakland Raiders ====
Week Sixteen: Seattle Seahawks vs. Oakland Raiders – Game summary

Quarter	1	2	3	4	Total
Raiders	3	0	0	7	10
Seahawks	17	10	14	3	44

at Kingdome, Seattle

- Date: December 17
- Game time: 5:02 pm local
- Game weather: indoors
- Game attendance: 58,428
- Referee: Jerry Markbreit
- TV announcers (ESPN): Mike Patrick, Joe Theismann, and Mark Malone
- Gamebook

Game information

First quarter

- SEA – Chris Warren 15-yard run (Todd Peterson kick), 12:20 (SEA 7–0)
- SEA – Chris Warren 14-yard run (Todd Peterson kick), 6:51 (SEA 14–0)
- OAK – Jeff Jaeger 42-yard field goal, 2:57 (SEA 14–3)
- SEA – Todd Peterson 39-yard field goal, 0:43 (SEA 17–3)

Second quarter

- SEA – Joey Galloway 43-yard pass from John Friesz (Todd Peterson kick), 12:50 (SEA 24–3)
- SEA – Todd Peterson 19-yard field goal, 2:57 (SEA 27–3)

Third quarter

- SEA – Corey Harris 57-yard fumble return (Todd Peterson kick), 12:23 (SEA 34–3)
- SEA – Chris Warren 35-yard run (Todd Peterson kick), 4:35 (SEA 41–3)

Fourth quarter

- SEA – Todd Peterson 38-yard field goal, 13:25 (SEA 44–3)
- OAK – Tim Brown 80-yard pass from Billy Joe Hobert (Jeff Jaeger kick), 7:22 (SEA 44–10)

Top passers

- OAK – Billy Joe Hobert: 8/13, 127 yds, 1 TD
- SEA – John Friesz: 16/25, 220 yds, 1 TD

Top rushers

- OAK – Harvey Williams: 12 car, 67 yds
- SEA – Chris Warren: 17 car, 105 yds, 3 TD

Top receivers

- OAK – Tim Brown: 3 rec, 102 yds, 1 TD
- SEA – Joey Galloway: 5 rec, 108 yds, 1 TD

Team – pass – rush – total – to

- OAK – 182 – 140 – 322 – 1
- SEA – 220 – 119 – 339 – 0

==== Week 17: at Kansas City Chiefs ====
Week Seventeen: Seattle Seahawks at Kansas City Chiefs – Game summary

Quarter	1	2	3	4	Total
Seahawks	0	3	0	0	3
Chiefs	13	7	3	3	26

at Arrowhead Stadium, Kansas City, Missouri

- Date: December 24
- Game time: 1:00 pm local
- Game weather: clear, 31 °F (−1 °C), 68% humidity, wind SW 10 miles per hour (16 km/h)
- Game attendance: 75,784
- Referee: Gordon McCarter
- TV announcers (NBC): Jim Lampley, Bob Golic
- Gamebook

Game information

First quarter

- KC – Tamarick Vanover 94-yard kickoff return (Lin Elliott kick), 14:45 (KC 7–0)
- KC – Lin Elliott 37-yard field goal, 10:22 (KC 10–0)
- KC – Lin Elliott 20-yard field goal, 0:26 (KC 13–0)

Second quarter

- SEA – Todd Peterson 34-yard field goal, 13:35 (KC 13–3)
- KC – Tamarick Vanover 9-yard pass from Steve Bono (Lin Elliott kick), 10:16 (KC 20–3)

Third quarter

- KC – Lin Elliott 20-yard field goal, 7:25 (KC 23–3)

Fourth quarter

- KC – Lin Elliott 27-yard field goal, 4:34 (KC 26–3)

Top passers

- SEA – John Friesz: 10/26, 80 yds
- KC – Steve Bono: 15/29, 209 yds, 1 TD, 1 INT

Top rushers

- SEA – Steve Broussard: 2 car, 15 yds
- KC – Greg Hill: 21 car, 113 yds

Top receivers

- SEA – Joey Galloway: 5 rec, 50 yds
- KC – Webster Slaughter: 3 rec, 73 yds

Team – pass – rush – total – to

- SEA – 63 – 26 – 89 – 0
- KC – 201 – 174 – 375 – 1
