= Randy Mueller =

American football executive (born 1961)

New Orleans Saints
- Title: Senior personnel advisor

Personal information
- Born: June 3, 1961 (age 65); St. Maries, Idaho, U.S.

Career information
- High school: St. Maries (ID)
- College: Linfield

Career history
- Seattle Seahawks (1983–1989) Pro personnel assistant; Seattle Seahawks (1990–1994) Pro personnel director; Seattle Seahawks (1995–1999) Vice president of football operations; New Orleans Saints (2000–2001) General manager; Miami Dolphins (2005–2007) General manager; Los Angeles Chargers (2008–2018) Senior executive for football operations; Salt Lake Stallions (2018–2019) General manager; Houston Roughnecks (2020) Director of pro personnel; Seattle Sea Dragons (2022–2023) Director of player personnel; New Orleans Saints (2024–present) Senior personnel advisor

Awards and highlights
- NFL Executive of the Year (2000)
- Executive profile at Pro Football Reference

Randy Mueller (born June 3, 1961) is an American professional football executive who is a senior personnel advisor for the New Orleans Saints of the National Football League (NFL). He previously served as the general manager for the NFL's Miami Dolphins and Saints, along with the Alliance of American Football (AAF)'s Salt Lake Stallions. He has over two decades of NFL front office experience.

== Early life ==
Born and raised in St. Maries, Idaho, Mueller played quarterback at St. Maries High School and Linfield College in McMinnville, Oregon. As a senior in 1982, he led his team to the NAIA Division II national championship and was named Most Valuable Player of the title game.

== Professional career ==
=== Seattle Seahawks ===
Mueller began his front office career in 1983 as an assistant in pro personnel with the Seattle Seahawks. He was promoted the position of pro personnel director in 1990 — a position he held until 1995. At that time he was promoted to vice president of football operations and held that post through 1999. First he traded quarterback Rick Mirer to the Chicago Bears for a first round pick, then Mueller selected Florida State offensive tackle Walter Jones with the sixth-overall pick in the 1997 NFL draft.

=== New Orleans Saints and ESPN ===
In 2000, Mueller became general manager of football operations for the New Orleans Saints. During his first year with the team, the Saints won the NFC West title and went on to win their first playoff game in franchise history. As a result, he was named Sporting News NFL Executive of the Year in 2000. The 2001 team could not improve, however, winning just seven games while selling only 25,000 season tickets for the following season to come, lowest in team history.

In 2002, Mueller traded running back Ricky Williams and the team's fourth-round selection in the 2002 NFL draft to the Miami Dolphins in exchange for their first- and fourth-round picks in 2002 and a conditional third-round pick in the 2003 NFL draft, which became a first-round pick after Williams ran for over 1,800 yards in his first season with the Dolphins. In May 2002, he was fired in what he called a surprise; owner Tom Benson called the firing one due to a "communication problem" in the decision process of making deals by management. He had been offered an extension on his contract (one year remaining) before the firing.

From 2002 to 2005, Mueller served as an NFL analyst for ESPN.

=== Miami Dolphins ===
On June 6, 2005, Mueller was hired as the general manager for the Miami Dolphins. Because then head coach Nick Saban had the final say on all roster moves, unlike most NFL general managers Mueller did not have control over player personnel decisions. After Saban's departure in January 2007, Mueller's authority increased as he took over responsibility for player personnel decisions. Mueller was also heavily involved in the team's search for its next head coach and eventual hiring of San Diego Chargers offensive coordinator Cam Cameron. On June 26, 2007 Mueller signed a contract extension that was expected to keep him with the team as general manager through at least 2009. Mueller was also to receive a salary adjustment, details of which were not publicly unavailable. On December 31, 2007 ESPN.com reported that Bill Parcells had fired Mueller as the Dolphins finished 1–15 (Cameron was fired a few days later).

=== San Diego/Los Angeles Chargers ===
Mueller joined the San Diego Chargers on April 29, 2008 as senior executive.

=== Alternative football leagues ===
In 2018, Mueller was hired by the Salt Lake Stallions of the newly created Alliance of American Football (AAF). After the AAF folded, he joined another fledgling league in the XFL, becoming the Houston Roughnecks' director of pro personnel in 2019 and later with the Seattle Dragons in 2022. On January 1, 2024, it was announced the Sea Dragons would not be a part of the UFL Merger.

=== Return to New Orleans ===
In 2024, Mueller rejoined the Saints as a senior personnel advisor.

== Personal ==
Mueller and his wife Lori have a daughter named Riley. His younger brother, Rick Mueller, is a longtime professional football executive, most recently as director of player personnel with the Arlington Renegades
