= Todd Peterson =

American football player (born 1970)

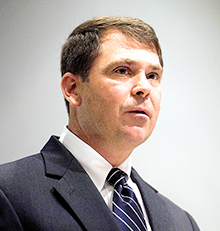
- Peterson in 2015

No. 2
- Position: Placekicker

Personal information
- Born: February 4, 1970 (age 56); Washington D.C., U.S.
- Listed height: 5 ft 11 in (1.80 m)
- Listed weight: 180 lb (82 kg)

Career information
- High school: Valdosta (Valdosta, Georgia)
- College: Georgia
- NFL draft: 1993: 7th round, 177th overall pick

Career history
- New York Giants (1993)*; New England Patriots (1993)*; Atlanta Falcons (1994)*; Arizona Cardinals (1994); Seattle Seahawks (1995–1999); Kansas City Chiefs (2000–2001); Pittsburgh Steelers (2002); San Francisco 49ers (2003–2004); Atlanta Falcons (2005)
- * Offseason or practice squad member only

Career NFL statistics
- Field goals made: 235
- Field goals attempted: 296
- Field goal %: 79.4
- Longest field goal: 54
- Stats at Pro Football Reference

Joseph Todd Peterson (born February 4, 1970) is an American former professional football player who was a placekicker in the National Football League (NFL). He played college football for the Georgia Bulldogs and was selected by the New York Giants in the seventh round of the 1993 NFL draft. Peterson last played with the Atlanta Falcons in 2005. His contract with the Falcons expired on March 11, 2006 and he retired after that season. He and his wife, Susan, are co-owners of Cabell's Designs LLC, with Cabell Sweeney. Cabell's is a design and licensing group focusing on collegiately licensed products in the giftware industry.

== College career ==
Peterson spent two years at the U.S. Naval Academy before transferring to the University of Georgia where during Peterson's senior year, he led the SEC in field goal percentage, and was named the University's first GTE Academic All-American in more than a decade since Terry Hoage. Peterson was also inducted into the University of Georgia's highest order, Sphinx in 1993.

== Professional career ==
Peterson was selected in the seventh round of the 1993 NFL draft with the 177th overall pick, but didn't debut until 1994 with the Arizona Cardinals, where he only appeared in two games that season, before going to the Seattle Seahawks. Peterson went through his prime years as a Seahawk, from 1995-1999 until he got picked up by the Kansas City Chiefs, where he spent two years, when he then became a member of the Pittsburgh Steelers for the 2002 season. He then went to the San Francisco 49ers, where he spent two years. After the 2004 season, the Atlanta Falcons picked up Peterson, where he spent one season before his contract expired and he subsequently retired. Peterson was honored as the NFL Man of the Year, 1996, in Seattle and served three terms totaling six years on the NFLPA's Board during his career.

== NFL career statistics ==
Year	Team	GP	Field Goal									Extra Point			Total Points
Year	Team	GP	FGM	FGA	Pct	<20	20−29	30−39	40−49	50+	Lng	XPM	XPA	Pct	Total Points
1994	ARI	2	2	4	50.0	0−0	1−1	1−1	0−2	0−0	35	4	4	100.0	10
1995	SEA	16	23	28	82.1	1−1	5−5	9−10	8−10	0−2	49	40	40	100.0	109
1996	SEA	16	28	34	82.4	0−0	11−13	7−7	8−11	2−3	49	27	27	100.0	111
1997	SEA	16	22	28	78.6	0−0	9−9	7−10	5−7	1−2	52	37	37	100.0	103
1998	SEA	16	19	24	79.2	3−3	4−4	4−5	5−5	3−7	51	41	41	100.0	98
1999	SEA	16	34	40	85.0	1−1	10−10	8−11	14−16	1−2	51	32	32	100.0	134
2000	KC	11	15	20	75.0	1−1	5−5	7−9	2−5	0−0	42	25	25	100.0	70
2001	KC	16	27	35	77.1	0−0	9−11	9−10	8−12	1−2	51	27	28	96.4	108
2002	PIT	10	12	21	57.1	1−1	2−3	6−10	3−7	0−0	46	25	26	96.1	61
2003	SF	8	12	15	80.0	0−0	5−7	3−3	4−4	0−1	48	22	23	95.7	58
2004	SF	16	18	22	81.8	1−1	3−3	7−8	5−6	2−4	51	23	23	100.0	77
2005	ATL	16	23	25	92.0	0−0	9−10	11−11	3−4	0−0	43	35	35	100.0	104
Career		159	235	296	79.4	5−5	76−84	79−95	65−89	10−23	54	338	341	99.1	1,043

== Sources ==
- TheGoal.com ~ Todd Peterson
- Yahoo! Sports ~ Todd Peterson
- SI.com ~ Todd Peterson
