= Steve Broussard =

American football player and coach (born 1967)

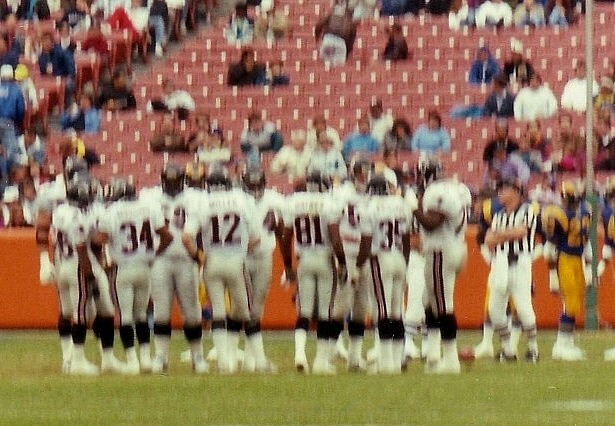

Delaware State Hornets
- Title: Running backs coach

Personal information
- Born: February 22, 1967 (age 59); Los Angeles, California, U.S.
- Listed height: 5 ft 7 in (1.70 m)
- Listed weight: 201 lb (91 kg)

Career information
- Position: Running back (No. 34, 31)
- High school: Manual Arts (Los Angeles, California)
- College: Washington State
- NFL draft: 1990: 1st round, 20th overall pick

Career history

Playing
- Atlanta Falcons (1990–1993); Cincinnati Bengals (1994); Seattle Seahawks (1995–1998); Baltimore Ravens (1999)*
- * Offseason or practice squad member only

Coaching
- Don Lugo HS (CA) (2000) Offensive coordinator; Diamond Ranch HS (CA) (2001) Offensive coordinator; Diamond Ranch HS (CA) (2002–2003) Head coach; Portland State (2004–2006) Running backs coach & wide receivers coach; Washington State (2007–2009) Special teams coordinator & running backs coach; Arizona State (2010–2011) Wide receivers coach & recruiting coordinator; UCLA (2012–2013) Running backs coach; SMU (2014) Running backs coach; Pasadena City (2015) Offensive coordinator; Fort Vancouver HS (WA) (2017) Head coach; St. Monica Catholic HS (CA) (2018) Head coach; St. Bernard HS (CA) (2021) Head coach; Montana State–Northern (2023) Offensive coordinator; Cal Poly (2024–2025) Running backs coach; Delaware State (2026–present) Running backs coach

Awards and highlights
- Seattle Seahawks 35th Anniversary team; Pac-10 Receiving Leader(1987), PAC-10 Rushing Leader(1988), Pac-10 All-Purpose Leader (1989) and Pac-10 Offensive Player of the Year (1989); First-team All-Pac-10 (1988); Second-team All-Pac-10 (1987); 2015 Induction to Washington State University Football Hall of Fame; 2025 Induction to Pacific Northwest Football Hall of Fame

Career NFL statistics
- Rushing yards: 2,625
- Rushing average: 4.5
- Rushing touchdowns: 19
- Stats at Pro Football Reference

Steve Nelson Broussard (born February 22, 1967) is an American college football coach and former player. He is the running backs coach for California Polytechnic State University, San Luis Obispo, a position he has held since 2024. He played professionally as a running back in the National Football League (NFL) for the Atlanta Falcons, Cincinnati Bengals, and Seattle Seahawks.

Broussard played college football for the Washington State Cougars and was selected by Atlanta in the first round of the 1990 NFL draft with the 20th overall pick. After his playing career, he has also served as a former assistant coach for several college football teams.

== College career ==
Born and raised in Los Angeles, and Altadena/Pasadena California, Broussard starred at Manual Arts High School and graduated in 1985. He played college football at Washington State University in Pullman, and led the Pac-10 in receiving as a sophomore (1987) and rushing as a junior (1988). In his senior year in 1989, Broussard led the conference in all-purpose yards, was the MVP (offensive), and ranked ninth in the nation in rushing yards per game. He completed his college career ranked third on the Cougars' all-time rushing list, fifth on the career receiving list, and owned two of the top three single-season rushing marks. He was named to the Cougar Hall of Fame in 2015.

== Professional career ==
Pre-draft measurables
Height	Weight	Arm length	Hand span	40-yard dash	10-yard split	20-yard split	20-yard shuttle	Vertical jump	Broad jump	Bench press
5 ft 6 1/4 in (1.68 m)	201 lb (91 kg)	28 in (0.71 m)	8 in (0.20 m)	4.45 s	1.58 s	2.63 s	4.29 s	31.0 in (0.79 m)	9 ft 2 in (2.79 m)	15 reps

Broussard was the 20th overall pick in the first round of the 1990 NFL draft by the Atlanta Falcons. He played four seasons for Atlanta (1990–1993), one in Cincinnati, then four more for the Seattle Seahawks (under head coach Dennis Erickson), and retired after the 1998 season.

== NFL career statistics ==
Year	Team	GP	Att	Yds	Avg	Lng	TD	Rec	Yds	Avg	Lng	TD
1990	ATL	13	126	454	3.6	50	4	24	160	6.7	18	0
1991	ATL	14	99	449	4.5	36	4	12	120	10.0	25	1
1992	ATL	15	84	363	4.3	27	1	11	96	8.7	24	1
1993	ATL	8	39	206	5.3	26	1	1	4	4.0	4	0
1994	CIN	13	94	403	4.3	37	2	34	218	6.4	25	0
1995	SEA	15	46	222	4.8	21	1	10	94	9.4	25	0
1996	SEA	12	15	106	7.1	26	1	6	28	4.3	9	0
1997	SEA	16	70	418	6.0	77	5	24	143	6.0	20	1
1998	SEA	15	5	4	0.8	3	0	4	21	5.3	16	0
Career		121	578	2,625	4.5	77	19	126	882	7.0	25	3

== Coaching career ==
After his nine-year NFL career, Broussard spent four years coaching high school football in California. He was the offensive coordinator at Don Lugo High School in Chino before going to Diamond Ranch High School as offensive coordinator in 2001. He became head coach at Diamond Ranch in 2002 and coached until 2003. His first season as head coach resulted in success with the Diamond Ranch Panthers taking the Mt. Baldy League Title. For the 2003 season, the Diamond Ranch Panthers were the heavy favorites (ranked #1 in preseason Mt. Baldy League) to take the league title once again with several returning seniors on offense & defense, and a talented junior class that featured three Division I prospects. The Panthers finished 1–4 in Mt. Baldy League play for the 2003 season.

Before the 2004 season, Portland State head coach Tim Walsh hired Broussard as a running backs coach. During the 2004 season, Broussard coached a first-team All-Big Sky fullback in Allen Kennett, while running backs Joe Rubin and Ryan Fuqua combined to lead the Vikings to a Big Sky Conference best-rushing average of 204.4 yards per game. Broussard coached the receivers his last 2 years at PSU until he was hired by Washington State before the 2007 season.

On February 8, 2007, Washington State head coach Bill Doba announced that Broussard would be returning to WSU to serve as the Cougars' running backs coach and special teams coordinator.

In 2011, Broussard moved to Arizona State University to coach receivers under head coach Dennis Erickson. ASU ranked 10th in the nation in passing offense (316.7 yds/g), and receiver Gerell Robinson ranked ninth in the nation with 107. 5 receiving yards per game. During the 2010 season, Broussard's receiving corps ranked 15th in the nation (286.4) and totaled 279 receptions for 3,437 yards and 23 touchdowns.

In his first season with the UCLA Bruins in 2012, Broussard directed a running back group headed by senior Johnathan Franklin, who set new school season (1,734 yards) and career (4,403) rushing marks on his way to earning All-America honors. Franklin, a finalist for the Doak Walker Award, also set a school record with nine 100-yard rushing games in 2012 and established new marks for both career (4,925) and season (2,062) all-purpose yardage. He went on to be selected by the Green Bay Packers in the 2013 NFL draft.

In his second season with the Bruins, Broussard directed a running back group headed by Myles Jack, who won Pac-12 Freshman of the Year honors in 2013. Jack set a UCLA single-game scoring record with four touchdowns in the win over Washington on November 15.

Broussard reconnected with SMU head coach June Jones, the coach who had a part in drafting him in Atlanta, on the Mustangs where he coached the running backs for one season in 2014. During the 2015 season, Broussard was the offensive coordinator at Pasadena City College.

In April 2017, Broussard was hired as the new head coach at Fort Vancouver High School in Vancouver, Washington. In February 2018, Broussard was reported to be taking the head football coaching job at St. Monica Catholic High School in California.

On May 20, 2024, Cal Poly hired Broussard as their running backs coach.

In February 2026, Broussard was hired by Delaware State University as their running backs coach under head coach, DeSean Jackson.
