= James McKnight (American football) =

American football player (born 1972)

No. 19, 82, 80
- Position: Wide receiver

Personal information
- Born: June 17, 1972 (age 54); Orlando, Florida, U.S.
- Listed height: 6 ft 1 in (1.85 m)
- Listed weight: 198 lb (90 kg)

Career information
- High school: Apopka (Apopka, Florida)
- College: Liberty
- NFL draft: 1994: undrafted

Career history
- Seattle Seahawks (1994–1998); Dallas Cowboys (1999–2000); Miami Dolphins (2001–2003); New York Giants (2004)

Career NFL statistics
- Receptions: 222
- Receiving yards: 3,595
- Receiving touchdowns: 18
- Stats at Pro Football Reference

James Edward McKnight (born June 17, 1972) is an American former professional football player who was a wide receiver in the National Football League (NFL) for the Seattle Seahawks, Dallas Cowboys, Miami Dolphins and New York Giants. He played college football for the Liberty Flames.

== Early life ==
McKnight attended Apopka High School, where he lettered in football, basketball and track.

He accepted a football scholarship to play for Liberty University under former NFL head coach Sam Rutigliano. He was forced to sit out his freshman season, however, due to the NCAA's Proposition 48 regulation.

McKnight became a starter as a junior, registering 50 receptions for 711 yards and five touchdowns. As a senior, he had 39 receptions for 812 yards and eight touchdowns.

He finished his college career with 144 receptions for 1,948 yards (17.1-yard average), 17 touchdowns and eight 100-yard games.

== Professional career ==
=== Seattle Seahawks ===
McKnight was signed as an undrafted free agent by the Seattle Seahawks after the 1994 NFL draft on April 29. He spent the first ten games of the season on the practice squad, before being promoted to the active roster on November 19. In 1995, he registered 14 special teams tackles. The next year, he was second on the team with 25 special teams tackles.

He slowly developed into a deep threat at wide receiver. In 1997, he suffered a sprained knee injury in the preseason finale against the Cincinnati Bengals and missed the first four games of the regular season. He started six games, while registering 34 receptions for 637 yards and six touchdowns. In the ninth week against the Oakland Raiders, he had four receptions for 100 yards and one touchdown, marking his first career 100-yard receiving game. In that contest, he teamed with Joey Galloway (seven receptions for 117 yards) to become the third pair of receivers in franchise history to top 100 yards in the same game.

In 1998, he was the team's third wide receiver, finishing with 21 receptions for 346 yards and two touchdowns. On June 24, 1999, he was traded to the Dallas Cowboys in exchange for a third round draft choice (#80-Darrell Jackson).

=== Dallas Cowboys ===
McKnight spent the 1999 season on the injured reserve list, after tearing the anterior cruciate ligament in his left knee during the Blue-White scrimmage on August 5.

In 2000, he became the team's leading receiver after Joey Galloway was lost to an injury for the season, registering 52 receptions for 926 yards and two touchdowns. He also had to adjust while playing with three different quarterbacks (Troy Aikman, Randall Cunningham and Anthony Wright).

=== Miami Dolphins ===
On March 16, 2001, he signed as a free agent with the Miami Dolphins, reuniting with offensive coordinator Chan Gailey, who was his head coach with the Dallas Cowboys. He started 15 games, tallying 55 receptions for 684 yards and three touchdowns.

In 2002, he was relegated to a reserve role after Oronde Gadsden passed him on the depth chart, finishing with nine starts, 29 receptions for 528 yards and two touchdowns.

The next year, he was the team's third wide receiver and his production dropped to 23 receptions for 285 yards and two touchdowns. He was released on March 2, 2004.

=== New York Giants ===
On May 20, 2004, he was signed by the New York Giants. He was placed on the injured reserve list after being sidelined with a turf toe injury since early in training camp. He was not re-signed at the end of the season.

== NFL career statistics ==
Legend
	Led the league
**Bold**	Career high

=== Regular season ===
Year	Team	Games		Receiving				
Year	Team	GP	GS	Rec	Yds	Avg	Lng	TD
1994	SEA	2	0	1	25	25.0	25	1
1995	SEA	16	0	6	91	15.2	24	0
1996	SEA	16	0	1	73	**73.0**	73	0
1997	SEA	12	6	34	637	18.7	60	**6**
1998	SEA	14	3	21	346	16.5	59	2
2000	DAL	16	15	52	**926**	17.8	48	2
2001	MIA	16	15	**55**	684	12.4	40	3
2002	MIA	15	9	29	528	18.2	77	2
2003	MIA	15	1	23	285	12.4	**80**	2
Total		122	49	222	3,595	16.2	80	18

=== Playoffs ===
Year	Team	Games		Receiving				
Year	Team	GP	GS	Rec	Yds	Avg	Lng	TD
2001	MIA	1	1	4	26	6.5	12	0
Total		1	1	4	26	6.5	12	0

== Personal life ==
McKnight worked as a financial services advisor. He currently coaches football and track and field at Calvary Christian Academy in Fort Lauderdale, Florida, working with the wide receivers.
