= Reggie Brooks =

American football player (born 1971)

No. 40, 41
- Position: Running back

Personal information
- Born: January 19, 1971 (age 55); Tulsa, Oklahoma, U.S.
- Listed height: 5 ft 8 in (1.73 m)
- Listed weight: 211 lb (96 kg)

Career information
- High school: Washington (Tulsa, Oklahoma)
- College: Notre Dame
- NFL draft: 1993: 2nd round, 45th overall pick

Career history
- Washington Redskins (1993–1995); Tampa Bay Buccaneers (1996); Barcelona Dragons (1998)

Awards and highlights
- PFWA All-Rookie Team (1993); Second-team All-American (1992)

Career NFL statistics
- Rushing yards: 1,726
- Rushing average: 3.9
- Rushing touchdowns: 7
- Stats at Pro Football Reference

Reginald Arthur Brooks (born January 19, 1971) is an American former professional football player who was a running back in the National Football League (NFL). He played college football for the Notre Dame Fighting Irish, earning second-team All-American honors in 1992.

Brooks attended Booker T. Washington High School in Tulsa, Oklahoma. He is the uncle to Minnesota Vikings Linebacker Anthony Barr.

Brooks was inducted into Booker T. Washington’s 2022 Ring of Honor class during a ceremony between the Hornets’ basketball games against Bixby on Friday night, Feb 4, 2022 at Nathan E. Harris Fieldhouse.

== Career ==
=== College ===
Brooks, following his older brother Tony, enrolled at the University of Notre Dame in 1989. Originally a defensive back, he converted to tailback for the 1991 season and won a spot in the starting lineup for 1992. During his senior season at Notre Dame, Brooks enjoyed massive success, rushing for 1,372 yards with an 8.0 yards per carry average while scoring 13 touchdowns. He was named an All-American and finished fifth in Heisman Trophy voting that year.

- 1991: 18 carries for 122 yards and 2 touchdowns. 1 catch for 4 yards.
- 1992: 167 carries for 1,343 yards and 13 touchdowns. 1 catch for 24 yards and 1 touchdown.

=== Professional ===
He was drafted by the Washington Redskins in the second round of the 1993 NFL draft. Brooks had a great rookie season with 1,063 rushing yards with a 4.8 average. The rest of his career didn't pan out and he was out of football by the end of the 1996 NFL season. He spent three years with the Redskins and one with the Tampa Bay Buccaneers.

=== Post-football career ===
Brooks is employed by Notre Dame as its Director of Student-Athlete Alumni Relations/Engagement. He is also a fixture on Notre Dame's football post-game show and other productions of Fighting Irish Digital Media. He is married and has five children.

== Notable performances ==
=== The Unconscious Touchdown ===
He is well known for a 20-yard touchdown run against rival University of Michigan in 1992. After catching a pitched ball on an option-right, Brooks broke six Wolverines tackles, the last of which knocked him unconscious before stumbling across the goal-line and collapsing face-first in the end zone.

=== The Snow Bowl ===
The Fighting Irish went up against Penn State in the final home game of 1992. A heavy snowfall throughout the first half made for a highly defensive struggle between the two perennial powerhouse programs. Trailing 16–9 with 4:25 left in the fourth quarter, senior quarterback Rick Mirer led the Irish on a 64-yard scoring drive, throwing to fullback Jerome Bettis on fourth down for a 3-yard score. Down by one point, Notre Dame coach Lou Holtz opted to go for two points and the win. Mirer dropped back to pass and was forced out of the pocket by the Penn State defense. Brooks, who had lined up as a slot receiver, worked across the field as the two primary receivers on the play were covered. Despite the fact that Brooks only had one reception all season, Mirer lofted the ball towards him in the back corner of the end zone. Brooks made a diving catch and the Irish prevailed, 17–16.

He was the winner of the 1995 and 1996 Madden Bowl.
