= Mike Barber (linebacker) =

American football player (born 1971)

No. 54, 53, 65
- Position: Linebacker

Personal information
- Born: November 9, 1971 (age 54); Edgemoor, South Carolina, U.S.
- Listed height: 6 ft 0 in (1.83 m)
- Listed weight: 246 lb (112 kg)

Career information
- High school: Lewisville (Richburg, South Carolina)
- College: Clemson
- NFL draft: 1995: undrafted

Career history
- Seattle Seahawks (1995–1997); Indianapolis Colts (1998–1999); New York/New Jersey Hitmen (2001)

Career NFL statistics
- Tackle: 209
- Sacks: 2
- Interceptions: 1
- Stats at Pro Football Reference

Mike Barber (born November 9, 1971) is an American former professional football player who was a linebacker in the National Football League (NFL). He was signed by the Seattle Seahawks as an undrafted free agent in 1995. He played college football for the Clemson Tigers.

Barber also played for the Indianapolis Colts.

== NFL career statistics ==
Legend
**Bold**	Career high

=== Regular season ===
Year	Team	Games		Tackles				Interceptions				Fumbles			
Year	Team	GP	GS	Comb	Solo	Ast	Sck	Int	Yds	TD	Lng	FF	FR	Yds	TD
1995	SEA	2	0	0	0	0	0.0	0	0	0	0	0	0	0	0
1996	SEA	13	7	42	32	10	0.0	0	0	0	0	**2**	**1**	0	0
1997	SEA	8	2	18	16	2	0.0	0	0	0	0	1	**1**	0	0
1998	IND	12	6	61	43	18	**2.0**	**1**	0	0	0	1	0	0	0
1999	IND	16	16	**88**	**60**	**28**	0.0	0	0	0	0	1	**1**	0	0
		51	31	209	151	58	2.0	1	0	0	0	5	3	0	0

=== Playoffs ===
Year	Team	Games		Tackles				Interceptions				Fumbles			
Year	Team	GP	GS	Comb	Solo	Ast	Sck	Int	Yds	TD	Lng	FF	FR	Yds	TD
1999	IND	1	1	10	9	1	0.0	0	0	0	0	0	0	0	0
		1	1	10	9	1	0.0	0	0	0	0	0	0	0	0
