= Chris Warren (American football) =

American football player (born 1967)

No. 35, 42
- Position: Running back

Personal information
- Born: January 24, 1967 (age 59); Silver Spring, Maryland, U.S.
- Listed height: 6 ft 2 in (1.88 m)
- Listed weight: 227 lb (103 kg)

Career information
- High school: Robinson (Fairfax, Virginia)
- College: Virginia (1985–1987); Ferrum (1988–1989)
- NFL draft: 1990: 4th round, 89th overall pick

Career history
- Seattle Seahawks (1990–1997); Dallas Cowboys (1998–2000); Philadelphia Eagles (2000)

Awards and highlights
- 2× Second-team All-Pro (1994, 1995); 3× Pro Bowl (1993–1995); Seattle Seahawks Top 50 players

Career NFL statistics
- Rushing yards: 7,696
- Rushing average: 4.3
- Rushing touchdowns: 52
- Receptions: 273
- Receiving yards: 1,935
- Receiving touchdowns: 5
- Stats at Pro Football Reference

Christopher Collins Warren II (born January 24, 1967) is an American former professional football player who was a running back in the National Football League (NFL) for 11 seasons. He played from 1990 to 2000, primarily for the Seattle Seahawks, but also for the Dallas Cowboys and Philadelphia Eagles.

== Early life ==
Born in Silver Spring, Maryland, Warren was raised in the metropolitan Washington, D.C. area and attended Robinson Secondary School in Fairfax, Virginia. After an outstanding high school football career with the Rams, he graduated in 1985 and enrolled at the University of Virginia in Charlottesville, but transferred after two years with the Cavaliers and finished at Ferrum College, a Division III school in rural southwestern Virginia. He was selected by the Seahawks in the fourth round (89th overall) of the 1990 NFL draft.

== Professional career ==
Pre-draft measurables
Height	Weight	Arm length	Hand span	40-yard dash	10-yard split	20-yard split	Vertical jump	Broad jump	Bench press
6 ft 1 3/4 in (1.87 m)	225 lb (102 kg)	31 3/4 in (0.81 m)	10 in (0.25 m)	4.61 s	1.65 s	2.74 s	36.5 in (0.93 m)	9 ft 6 in (2.90 m)	14 reps
All values from NFL Combine

Warren was drafted by the Seahawks in the fourth round of the 1990 NFL Draft. Initially seeing action as a kick returner, Warren's breakout season as a professional came in 1992, when he rushed for 1,017 yards. He followed that season with three more years with at least 1,000 yards rushing, setting a career-high in 1994 with 1,545 rushing yards. In 1995, Warren set another career-best with 15 rushing touchdowns.

Warren was a three-time selection for Pro Bowl in three consecutive seasons (1993, 1994, & 1995). By the end of his stint in Seattle he held the Seahawks' career rushing record, logging 6,706 total rushing yards for the franchise from 1990 to 1997. This record was held until 2005 when Shaun Alexander eclipsed the record during his MVP season.

In 1998 Warren signed with the Dallas Cowboys. He served as a kick returner, and a backup to Emmitt Smith. His best performance with the team came against the Redskins in week 5 of the 1998 season, when he and Smith both rushed for over 100 yards in the same game, marking the first time in 20 years such a feat was accomplished in Dallas. Warren was released after the 1999 season.

In 2018, Warren was a Pro Football Hall of Fame nominee along with fellow Seahawks running backs Shaun Alexander and Ricky Watters.

== Car crash ==
On December 1, 1994, Warren and teammates Lamar Smith and Mike Frier were involved in a collision in Kirkland, Washington, in which Smith's vehicle crashed into a utility pole. Warren and Smith walked away with minor injuries, while Frier took the brunt of the impact, becoming paralyzed from the waist down as a result.

== NFL career statistics ==
Legend
**Bold**	Career high

Year	Team	GP	Att	Yds	Avg	Lng	TD	Rec	Yds	Avg	Lng	TD
1990	SEA	16	6	11	1.8	4	1	0	0	0.0	0	0
1991	SEA	16	11	13	1.2	7	0	2	9	4.5	12	0
1992	SEA	16	223	1,017	4.6	**52**	3	16	134	8.4	33	0
1993	SEA	14	273	1,072	3.9	45	7	15	99	6.6	21	0
1994	SEA	16	**333**	**1,545**	4.6	41	9	41	**323**	7.9	51	**2**
1995	SEA	16	310	1,346	4.3	**52**	**15**	35	247	7.1	20	1
1996	SEA	14	203	855	4.2	51	5	40	273	6.8	33	0
1997	SEA	15	200	847	4.2	36	4	**45**	257	5.7	20	0
1998	DAL	9	59	291	**4.9**	49	4	13	66	5.1	15	1
1999	DAL	16	99	403	4.1	25	2	34	224	6.6	24	0
2000	DAL	13	59	254	4.3	32	2	31	302	**9.7**	**76**	1
2000	PHI	1	15	42	2.8	11	0	1	1	1.0	1	0
Career		162	1,791	7,696	4.3	52	52	273	1,935	7.1	76	5

== Personal life ==
Warren now helps out coaching for the Edison High School football team in Alexandria, Virginia. Warren has two sons, Chris III and Conlin, and two daughters, Ariana and Kayla. Chris Warren III was a running back for the Texas Longhorns for the 2015 through 2017 seasons; he then declared for the 2018 NFL draft. On May 7, 2018, Chris Warren III signed an undrafted free agent contract with the Oakland Raiders. As of 2020, he is the running back coach for the Thomas Jefferson High School for Science and Technology.

== Honors ==
- 1990: First-team All Rookie by Pro Football Weekly, College and Pro Football Newsweekly.
- 1991: First-team All-AFC by Football News.
- 1993: AFC Pro Bowl Squad, AFC Offensive Player of Week 3 (At New England)
- 1994: AFC Pro Bowl Squad, Seahawks Most Valuable Player (Voted By Teammates), First-team All-AFC (Pro Football Weekly\Pro Football Writers Association/Football News), Second-team All-NFL by Associated Press, College and Pro Newsweekly, Football Digest, AFC Offensive Player of Week 5 (At Pittsburgh 9/25).
- 1995: AFC Pro Bowl Starter; Seahawks Most Valuable Player (Voted By Teammates); First-team All-AFC (Pro Football Weekly/Pro Football Writers Association, United Press International, Football News), Second-team All-NFL (AP, College and Pro Football NewsWeekly, Football Digest); All-Madden Team (Selected By FOX-TV's NFL Analyst John Madden)
