= Eddie Goines =

American football player (born 1972)

No. 7
- Position: Wide receiver

Personal information
- Born: August 16, 1972 (age 54); Lakeland, Florida, U.S.
- Listed height: 6 ft 0 in (1.83 m)
- Listed weight: 190 lb (86 kg)

Career information
- High school: Lakeland
- College: NC State (1991–1994)
- NFL draft: 1995: 6th round, 203rd overall pick

Career history
- Seattle Seahawks (1995–1996); New York Giants (1998)*; Indianapolis Colts (1998)*; Arizona Rattlers (1999)
- * Offseason or practice squad member only
- Stats at ArenaFan.com

Eddie Goines (born August 16, 1972) is an American former football wide receiver. He played college football at NC State, and was selected by the Seattle Seahawks in the sixth round, with the 203rd overall pick, of the 1995 NFL draft. He played professionally in the Arena Football League (AFL).

== Early life ==
Eddie Goines was born on August 16, 1972, in Lakeland, Florida. He attended Lakeland Senior High School.

== College career ==
Goines was a four-year letterman for the NC State Wolfpack from 1991 to 1994. He finished his college career with totals of 147 carries for 2,352 yards and 17 touchdowns, 25 kick returns for 392 yards, and 20 punt returns for 182 yards. His 10 receiving touchdowns in 1993 was the most in the Atlantic Coast Conference (ACC) that year. Goines earned first-team All-ACC honors three times and Academic All-ACC honors four times.

== Professional career ==
Goines was selected by the Seattle Seahawks in the sixth round, with the 203rd overall pick, of the 1995 NFL draft. He missed the entire 1995 and 1996 seasons due to injury. He was released by Seattle on August 24, 1997.

Goines signed with the New York Giants on March 10, 1998. He was waived on August 25, 1998. He was signed to the Indianapolis Colts' practice squad on September 7, 1998.

Goines played in seven games for the Arizona Rattlers of the Arena Football League in 1999 as an offensive specialist, recording 39 receptions for 575 yards and 11 touchdowns, one rushing attempt for a four-yard touchdown, and 11 kick returns for 178 yards and one touchdown. He suffered a season-ending knee injury.

== Personal life ==
Goines became an actor after his football career.
