= Bob Bratkowski =

American football coach (born 1955)

Profile
- Position: Wide receivers coach

Personal information
- Born: December 2, 1955 (age 70); San Angelo, Texas, U.S.

Career information
- High school: Schlarman (Danville, Illinois)
- College: Washington State

Career history
- Missouri (1978–1980) Graduate assistant; Weber State (1981–1985) Offensive coordinator; Wyoming (1986) Offensive coordinator; Washington State (1987–1988) Offensive coordinator; Miami (FL) (1989–1991) Offensive coordinator; Seattle Seahawks (1992–1994) Wide receivers coach; Seattle Seahawks (1995–1998) Offensive coordinator; Pittsburgh Steelers (1999–2000) Wide receivers coach; Cincinnati Bengals (2001–2010) Offensive coordinator; Atlanta Falcons (2011) Quarterbacks coach; Jacksonville Jaguars (2012) Offensive coordinator; Cincinnati Bengals (2014–2015) Offensive assistant; Tennessee Titans (2016) Wide receivers coach
- Coaching profile at Pro Football Reference

Robert Bratkowski (born December 2, 1955) is an American former football coach. He is the son of former NFL quarterback Zeke Bratkowski. Bratkowski played college football for the Washington State Cougars as a wide receiver from 1975 to 1977.

== College assistant coach ==
Bratkowski began his coaching career in 1978 at Missouri. He became an offensive coordinator at Weber State in the Big Sky Conference under first-year head coach Mike Price in 1981. Bratkowski moved up to Division I-A in 1986 under head coach Dennis Erickson at Wyoming, and followed him to Washington State in 1987 and Miami in 1989.

- 1986 at Wyoming: Three Cowboy QBs combined to throw for 3,481 yards with 30 TD vs 21 INT.
- 1987 at Washington State: The Cougars had 1,644 yards rushing and scored 14 touchdowns on the ground.
- 1988 at Washington State: QB Timm Rosenbach threw for 3,097 yards with 24 TD and 11 INT. The Cougar ground game added 2,757 yards rushing and 29 touchdowns.
- 1989 at Miami: The Hurricane offense averaged 417 yards and 35 points per game and won the National Championship.
- 1990 at Miami: The Hurricane offense averaged 444 yards and 37 points per game.
- 1991 at Miami: The Hurricane offense averaged 405 yards and 32 points per game and won the National Championship.

== NFL assistant coach ==
Bratkowski moved to the NFL in 1992 with the Seattle Seahawks. After three seasons under head coach Tom Flores, he was promoted to offensive coordinator in 1995 by new head coach Dennis Erickson. When Erickson was fired following the 1998 season, Bratkowski became an assistant coach with the Pittsburgh Steelers.

In 2001, Bratkowski was offered the job of offensive coordinator with the Cincinnati Bengals, a position he held for a decade until January 31, 2011, when he was terminated from the Cincinnati Bengals as reported by ESPN news.

He coached the quarterbacks for the Atlanta Falcons in 2011, and became the offensive coordinator of the Jacksonville Jaguars in 2012, under first-year head coach Mike Mularkey.

Prior to the 2014 season, the Cincinnati Bengals re-hired Bob Bratkowski as an offensive assistant.

In 2016, new Tennessee Titans head coach Mike Mularkey coaxed Bratkowski out of retirement to coach wide receivers for the Titans. Bratkowski went back to retirement at the end of the 2017 season after Mularkey and the Titans mutually agreed to part ways.
