= Corey Harris (American football, born 1969) =

American football player

No. 86, 81, 30, 25, 45
- Positions: Safety, cornerback

Personal information
- Born: October 25, 1969 (age 57); Indianapolis, Indiana, U.S.
- Listed height: 5 ft 11 in (1.80 m)
- Listed weight: 213 lb (97 kg)

Career information
- High school: Ben Davis (Indianapolis)
- College: Vanderbilt
- NFL draft: 1992: 3rd round, 77th overall pick

Career history
- Houston Oilers (1992); Green Bay Packers (1992–1994); Seattle Seahawks (1995–1996); Miami Dolphins (1997); Baltimore Ravens (1998–2001); Detroit Lions (2002–2003)

Awards and highlights
- Super Bowl champion (XXXV); First-team All-SEC (1991)

Career NFL statistics
- Tackles: 626
- Sacks: 6.5
- Interceptions: 11
- Stats at Pro Football Reference

Corey Lamont Harris (born October 25, 1969) is an American former professional football player who was a safety in the National Football League (NFL). He was selected by the Houston Oilers in the third round of the 1992 NFL draft with the 77th overall pick. Over a 12-season career, Harris won a Super Bowl ring with the Baltimore Ravens after a victory in Super Bowl XXXV. Harris is a member of Kappa Alpha Psi fraternity.
