= Rick Mirer =

American football player (born 1970)

No. 3, 13, 5
- Position: Quarterback

Personal information
- Born: March 19, 1970 (age 56); Goshen, Indiana, U.S.
- Listed height: 6 ft 2 in (1.88 m)
- Listed weight: 210 lb (95 kg)

Career information
- High school: Goshen
- College: Notre Dame (1989–1992)
- NFL draft: 1993: 1st round, 2nd overall pick

Career history
- Seattle Seahawks (1993–1996); Chicago Bears (1997); Green Bay Packers (1998); New York Jets (1999); San Francisco 49ers (2000–2001); Oakland Raiders (2002–2003); Detroit Lions (2004)

Awards and highlights
- UPI Rookie of the Year (1993); PFWA All-Rookie Team (1993); Quarterback of the Year (1992)

Career NFL statistics
- Passing attempts: 2,043
- Passing completions: 1,088
- Completion percentage: 53.3%
- TD–INT: 50–76
- Passing yards: 11,969
- Passer rating: 63.5
- Stats at Pro Football Reference

Richard Franklin Mirer (born March 19, 1970) is an American former professional football player who was a quarterback in the National Football League (NFL) for 12 seasons. He played college football for the Notre Dame Fighting Irish, winning Quarterback of the Year in 1992. Mirer was selected second overall by the Seattle Seahawks in the 1993 NFL draft.

In his first season, Mirer set the rookie records for passing yards, attempts, and completions, earning him UPI Rookie of the Year. Unable to duplicate his success, Mirer would leave the Seahawks after four seasons. He spent the remainder of his career with the Chicago Bears, New York Jets, San Francisco 49ers, Oakland Raiders, and Detroit Lions, mostly as a backup.

== Early life ==
Mirer was born in Goshen, Indiana. At age eight, he competed in the National Punt, Pass and Kick Competition. His father, Ken, was head coach at Goshen High School in Goshen, Indiana but retired before Mirer made the varsity team. Mirer posted 3,973 yards and 30 touchdowns in his senior year, 2nd most in national prep history, and eclipsing Jeff George's Indiana High School passing records. Earned Academy of Achievement Award as the top high school football player in the country in 1989, along with being the winner of the Atlanta Touchdown Club's Bobby Dodd Award as the nation's best high school quarterback.

== College career ==
Mirer attended the University of Notre Dame from 1989 to 1992, accumulating a 29–7–1 record as starter – including 3 bowl games. He began his tenure serving as backup to Tony Rice, then took the reins of the Notre Dame offense in 1990 and led the team to the Orange Bowl. In 1991, Mirer set the single season touchdown record with 18 and was named co-MVP with teammate Jerome Bettis leading Notre Dame past Florida in the 1992 Sugar Bowl. He finished his career at Notre Dame by leading them to victory in the 1993 Cotton Bowl Classic. Mirer accounted for more points running and throwing (350) than any other player in Notre Dame history. He left Notre Dame 1st in career touchdowns with 41, and 2nd all time for total offense, completions, and passing yards; he was invited to play in the East-West Shrine Bowl, and Hula Bowl. Entering the 1993 Draft, he was hyped as the next Joe Montana, who also played college football at Notre Dame and was similar in stature. In 2008, Mirer was inducted into the Indiana Football Hall of Fame.

== Professional career ==
Pre-draft measurables
Height	Weight	Arm length	Hand span
6 ft 2 in (1.88 m)	216 lb (98 kg)	32 1/4 in (0.82 m)	9 1/4 in (0.23 m)
All values from NFL Combine

Mirer was selected with the second overall pick in the 1993 NFL Draft by the Seattle Seahawks. He signed a five-year, $15 million contract. In his rookie year under head coach Tom Flores, he set NFL rookie records for attempts, completions, and yards. In 1993, Mirer became only the third rookie quarterback since 1970 to start all of his team's games. He finished his rookie season fifth in the AFC with 274 completions and 2833 yards. These rookie records were later broken by Andrew Luck in 2012. He finished second for Offensive Rookie of the Year behind his former Notre Dame teammate Jerome Bettis.

On February 18, 1997, Mirer was traded with a fourth-round pick in the 1997 NFL draft to the Chicago Bears for their first-round draft pick, later packaged in a trade to the Atlanta Falcons to move up to 3rd overall that year to select Shawn Springs. Mirer signed a three-year, $11.4 million contract with the Bears, but played only seven games with three starts in the 1997 season.

Mirer requested to be released by the Bears in the beginning of the 1998 season and signed with the Green Bay Packers. Mirer never played a down for Green Bay, which was led by Brett Favre, and was later traded to the New York Jets in 1999 where he replaced an injured Vinny Testaverde as the Jets starter. In 2000, he was signed by the San Francisco 49ers to compete with Jeff Garcia. In 2002, Mirer became the a backup for the Oakland Raiders and became the starter for part of 2003. In 2004. Mirer was signed by the Detroit Lions, but saw no playing time. Mirer had a 63.5 passer rating, 11,969 passing yards, and 50 touchdown passes before he retired in 2004. Although playing for several teams that did make the playoffs during his career, Mirer never played a single down in the postseason. Mirer posted a 24–44 record as regular season starter in 12 seasons in the NFL. He has career single game highs of 287 yards passing and three touchdowns.

== Career statistics ==
=== NFL ===
Year	Team	GP	Passing					Rushing			
Year	Team	GP	Att	Comp	Yds	TD	Int	Att	Yds	Avg	TD
1993	SEA	16	486	274	2,833	12	17	68	343	5.0	3
1994	SEA	13	381	195	2,151	11	7	34	153	4.5	0
1995	SEA	15	391	209	2,564	13	20	43	193	4.5	1
1996	SEA	11	265	136	1,546	5	12	33	191	5.8	2
1997	CHI	7	103	53	420	0	6	20	78	3.9	1
1998	GB	0	DNP								
1999	NYJ	8	176	95	1,062	5	9	21	89	4.2	1
2000	SF	1	20	10	126	1	0	3	0	0.0	0
2001	SF	0	DNP								
2002	OAK	0	DNP								
2003	OAK	9	221	116	1,267	3	5	20	183	4.2	1
2004	DET	0	DNP								
Career		80	2,043	1,088	11,969	50	76	242	1,130	4.7	9

=== College ===
Season	Team	Games		Passing								Rushing			
Season	Team	GP	GS	Cmp	Att	Pct	Yds	Avg	TD	Int	Rate	Att	Yds	Avg	TD
1989	Notre Dame	10	1	15	30	50.0	456	6.0	0	1	93.7	12	32	2.6	0
1990	Notre Dame	12	9	110	200	55.0	1,824	9.1	8	6	138.8	98	198	2.0	6
1991	Notre Dame	13	13	132	234	56.4	2,117	9.0	18	10	149.2	75	306	4.0	9
1992	Notre Dame	12	12	120	234	51.3	1,876	8.0	15	6	134.7	68	158	2.3	2
Career		47	35	377	698	54.0	5,997	8.6	41	23	139.0	253	694	2.7	17

== See also ==
- List of celebrities who own wineries and vineyards
