= Jason Kyle =

American football player (born 1972)

No. 57, 56
- Positions: Long snapper, linebacker

Personal information
- Born: May 12, 1972 (age 54); Tempe, Arizona, U.S.
- Listed height: 6 ft 3 in (1.91 m)
- Listed weight: 235 lb (107 kg)

Career information
- High school: McClintock (Tempe)
- College: Arizona State
- NFL draft: 1995: 4th round, 126th overall pick
- Expansion draft: 1999: 1st round, 8th overall pick

Career history
- Seattle Seahawks (1995–1998); Cleveland Browns (1999); St. Louis Rams (2000)*; San Francisco 49ers (2000); Carolina Panthers (2001–2008); New Orleans Saints (2009–2010)
- * Offseason or practice squad member only

Awards and highlights
- Super Bowl champion (XLIV)

Career NFL statistics
- Games played: 203
- Total tackles: 29
- Fumble recoveries: 3
- Stats at Pro Football Reference

Jason Campbell Kyle (born May 12, 1972) is an American former professional football player who was a long snapper in the National Football League (NFL). He was selected by the Seattle Seahawks in the fourth round of the 1995 NFL draft. He played college football for the Arizona State Sun Devils as a linebacker.

Kyle also played for the Cleveland Browns, San Francisco 49ers, Carolina Panthers, and New Orleans Saints.

Kyle was the long snapper for the Saints during their Super Bowl winning 2009 season and for the first nine games of 2010, but due to a shoulder injury he was then placed on the injured reserve list, ending his season.

== College career ==
After walking on originally, Kyle received a full athletic scholarship to Arizona State University as a linebacker where he led the Pac-10 in tackles. He was chosen to play in the East/West Shrine Game, Senior Bowl, and the Blue/Grey Game. Academically, he received the Sun Angel Chairman’s Award, First-team Academic All-Pacific-10 Award, and Maroon and Gold Scholar Athlete Award. He earned a marketing degree.

== Professional career ==
Kyle was selected by the Seattle Seahawks in 1995 as a linebacker. Over the career of sixteen years Kyle moved from linebacker to long snapping. He played his last season in 2010 with the New Orleans Saints and was a member of the 2010 Super Bowl Champions. Kyle also served on the board of directors for the NFLPA.
