= Henry McMillian =

American football player (born 1971)

No. 92
- Position: Defensive tackle

Personal information
- Born: October 17, 1971 (age 55); Folkston, Georgia, U.S.
- Listed height: 6 ft 3 in (1.91 m)
- Listed weight: 275 lb (125 kg)

Career information
- High school: Charlton (Folkston, Georgia)
- College: Florida
- NFL draft: 1995: 6th round, 180th overall pick

Career history
- Seattle Seahawks (1995–1997)

Career NFL statistics
- Games played: 4
- Stats at Pro Football Reference

Henry McMillian (born October 17, 1971) is an American former professional football player who was a defensive tackle for the Seattle Seahawks of the National Football League (NFL). He played college football for the Florida Gators and was selected by the Seahawks in the sixth round of the 1995 NFL draft.
