= Greg McMackin =

American football player and coach (1945–2023)

Biographical details
- Born: April 24, 1945; Springfield, Oregon, U.S.
- Died: February 14, 2023 (aged 77); South Dakota, U.S.

Playing career
- 1963–1966: Southern Oregon
- Position: Defensive back

Coaching career (HC unless noted)
- 1968: Arizona (GA)
- 1969–1970: Aloha HS (OR) (assistant)
- 1971–1972: Aloha HS (OR)
- 1973–1975: Western Oregon State (DC)
- 1976–1978: Idaho (DC/DB)
- 1979–1983: San Jose State (DB)
- 1984: Stanford (LB)
- 1985: Denver Gold (DB)
- 1986–1989: Oregon Tech
- 1990–1991: Utah (DC)
- 1992: Navy (DC)
- 1993–1994: Miami (FL) (DC)
- 1995–1998: Seattle Seahawks (DC)
- 1999: Hawaii (DC)
- 2000–2002: Texas Tech (DC)
- 2003–2005: San Francisco 49ers (LB)
- 2007: Hawaii (DC)
- 2008–2011: Hawaii

Administrative career (AD unless noted)
- 1986–1989: Oregon Tech (assistant AD)

Head coaching record
- Overall: 53–39–1 (college)
- Bowls: 0–2
- Tournaments: 2–1 (NAIA D-II playoffs)

Accomplishments and honors

Championships
- 1 WAC (2010); 1 CFL Southern Division (1987); 1 CFA Mount Hood Division (1988)

Gregory James McMackin (April 24, 1945 – February 14, 2023) was an American football coach and player. He served as the head football coach at Oregon Institute of Technology from 1986 to 1989 and at the University of Hawaii at Manoa from 2008 to 2011, compiling a career college football record of 53–39–1. Before coming to Hawaii as defensive coordinator in 2007, he previously served in the same capacity for the Seattle Seahawks, the Miami Hurricanes, and the Texas Tech Red Raiders.

== Career ==
McMackin coached extensively at both the collegiate and professional levels.

At the professional level, McMackin coached for two National Football League teams: as defensive coordinator for the Seattle Seahawks from 1995 to 1998, and as linebackers and assistant head coach for the San Francisco 49ers from 2003 to 2005. He also coached for the Denver Gold of the defunct United States Football League (USFL).

At the college level, McMackin gained prominence as the defense coordinator for the University of Miami for the 1993 and 1994 seasons. There, Miami won two Big East Championships and ranked first in total defense, scoring defense and pass defense. Further, the Hurricanes allowed just seven touchdowns on defense in one season. While there, he coached Lombardi Award winner Warren Sapp, Ray Lewis and six First-Team Consensus All-Americans. The Hurricanes played in the national championship game (Orange Bowl) in 1995.

McMackin served as defensive coordinator at six colleges: Hawaii, Texas Tech, Miami, Navy, Utah, and Idaho.

Briefly, during the first half of the 2007 spring semester, McMackin was an instructor at Texas Tech.

McMackin, previously the defensive coordinator for the Hawaii Warriors, was one of several individuals being considered to fill the vacancy left by June Jones as head coach. Jones left the Hawaii Warriors in January to become the head coach of SMU.

On January 15, 2008, McMackin took over the position of head coach for the Hawaii Warriors. Upon signing his five-year contract, McMackin became the highest-paid state employee with a $1.12 million annual salary. The previous record was held by his predecessor, June Jones, with an $800,016 annual salary.

On August 1, 2009 McMackin was suspended for 30 days without pay due to his use of a homophobic slur during an interview.

McMackin resigned from his position of head coach for Hawaii on December 5, 2011, accepting a $600,000 buyout.

== Personal life and death ==
McMackin died in South Dakota, on February 14, 2023, at the age of 77.

== Accomplishments ==
- Was Head Coach at Division II Oregon Tech from 1986–89. Led team to #3 ranking and 4 winning seasons on way to 2 coach of the year awards.
- In 1999, led the University of Hawaii's defense to help orchestrate the biggest single-season turnaround in NCAA football history
- Named one of the nation's top coaches by American Football Magazine while at Texas Tech.
- Named Big 12 Conference's top recruiter by Rivals.com
- As the defensive coordinator for the Seattle Seahawks, coached seven All-Pro selections, and established a franchise-record for seven interceptions in one game. Overall, Seattle's defense improved from 30th to 8th.
- As defensive coordinator for the University of Miami, McMackin's defense was ranked first in the nation in total defense, scoring defense and pass defense.
- Both of Hawaii's WAC championships during former coach June Jones' tenure at Hawaii came during both of McMackin's two years as defensive coordinator for Hawaii.
- Authored Coaching the Defensive Backfield in 1992, which is in its seventh printing.
- In 2008, McMackin became the highest paid State of Hawaii employee ($1.1 million) upon becoming the Hawaii Warriors football head coach.
- Inducted in the Southern Oregon University Athletic Hall of Fame.

== Notable players coached ==
- Ray Lewis, Miami
- Warren Sapp, Miami
- Dwayne Johnson a.k.a. The Rock, Miami
- Rohan Marley, Miami
- Gill Byrd, San Jose State
- Michael Sinclair, Seattle Seahawks
- Jeff Ulbrich, Hawaii and San Francisco 49ers
- Julian Peterson, Detroit Lions
- Cortez Kennedy, Seattle Seahawks
- Chad Brown, Seattle Seahawks

== Head coaching record ==
=== College ===
Year	Team	Overall	Conference	Standing	Bowl/playoffs
Oregon Tech Hustlin' Owls (Columbia Football League) (1986–1987)
1986	Oregon Tech	5–4	4–2	3rd (Southern)	
1987	Oregon Tech	5–4	5–1	1st (Southern)	
Oregon Tech Hustlin' Owls (Columbia Football Association) (1988–1989)
1988	Oregon Tech	9–3	6–0	1st (Mount Hood)	L NAIA Division II Semifinal
1989	Oregon Tech	5–3–1	3–2–1	4th (Mount Hood)	
Oregon Tech:		24–14–1	18–5–1		
Hawaii Warriors (Western Athletic Conference) (2008–2011)
2008	Hawaii	7–7	5–3	T–2nd	L Hawaii
2009	Hawaii	6–7	3–5	T–5th	
2010	Hawaii	10–4	7–1	T–1st	L Hawaii
2011	Hawaii	6–7	3–4	T–4th	
Hawaii:		29–25	18–13		
Total:		53–39–1			
National championship Conference title Conference division title or championship game berth
