= Carlester Crumpler =

American football player (born 1971)

Carlester Crumpler Jr.
No. 48, 87
- Position: Tight end

Personal information
- Born: September 5, 1971 (age 55); Greenville, North Carolina, U.S.
- Listed height: 6 ft 6 in (1.98 m)
- Listed weight: 253 lb (115 kg)

Career information
- High school: J.H. Rose (Greenville)
- College: East Carolina
- NFL draft: 1994: 7th round, 202nd overall pick

Career history
- Seattle Seahawks (1994–1998); Minnesota Vikings (1999)

Awards and highlights
- First-team All-American (1993)

Career NFL statistics
- Games played: 78
- Receptions: 90
- Receiving yards: 979
- Receiving TDs: 4
- Stats at Pro Football Reference

Carlester T. Crumpler Jr. (born September 5, 1971) is an American former professional football player who was a tight end for the Seattle Seahawks (1994–1998) and Minnesota Vikings (1999) of the National Football League (NFL). He played college football for the East Carolina Pirates, earning first-team All-American honors in 1993.

Crumpler began playing football in ninth grade. He graduated from JH Rose High School in Greenville, North Carolina. He received a B.A. in finance and an MBA from East Carolina University, where he played tight end for the Pirates. Crumpler was name an All American by the Walter Camp Football foundation in 1993. In 2013, Crumpler and his father, also named Carlester, were both named to the All-Time ECU second team.

Pre-draft measurables
Height	Weight	Arm length	Hand span
6 ft 5 1/2 in (1.97 m)	253 lb (115 kg)	34 1/2 in (0.88 m)	10 1/8 in (0.26 m)

The Seahawks selected Crumpler in the seventh round with the 202nd overall pick of the 1994 NFL draft. He started 4 games in his first season, then a combined 26 games from 1995 to 1997. In 1998, his final season in Seattle, he fell behind Christian Fauria, a second round draft pick in 1995, on the depth chart. He started one game for the 1999 Minnesota Vikings.

== Personal life ==
Crumpler is the son of Carlester Crumpler, a record-setting running back at ECU who was drafted by the Buffalo Bills in 1974. Crumpler's younger brother is former Pro Bowl tight end Alge Crumpler. He has another brother who is a musician. He is the half-brother of A'riana Crumpler, who competed in throwing events for ECU's track and field team and Isaiah Crumpler, who plays football for Rutgers. Crumpler said he was named Rodney at birth, but his mother wanted to name him after his father. He said his father's name was a compromise between his grandmother and her mother, who liked the names Carl and Lester. Crumpler's mother died in 2023.

In high school, Crumpler also played basketball, ran track and field, and played trombone.

After ending his football career, Crumpler became a financial advisor, working at Bank of America and Merrill Lynch. Crumpler is married and has three children.
