= 1996 San Diego Chargers season =

NFL team 37th season

- Owner: Alex Spanos
- General manager: Bobby Beathard
- Head coach: Bobby Ross
- Home stadium: Jack Murphy Stadium

Results
- Record: 8–8
- Division place: 3rd AFC West
- Playoffs: Did not qualify
- All-Pros: 2: WR Tony Martin (2nd team); LB Junior Seau (1st team)
- Pro Bowlers: 2: WR Tony Martin; LB Junior Seau

The 1996 San Diego Chargers season was the franchise's 37th, its 27th in the National Football League (NFL), and its 34th in San Diego.

The season began with the team trying to improve on their 9–7 record in 1995. The Chargers fell back by one game and missed the playoffs by that margin. It was Bobby Ross's final season as the team's head coach, as he left due to "philosophical differences" with general manager Bobby Beathard. He had posted a 47–33 record over five seasons, going 3–3 in the playoffs.

Natrone Means had been let go following his injury the previous season. In his place, San Diego tried a running-back-by-committee approach featuring Leonard Russell, Aaron Hayden and Terrell Fletcher. This yielded 186 rushing yards in week one, but only four further 100-yard games throughout the season. Hayden was seldom used as the year went on — Russell managed 713 yards and 7 touchdowns, but the Chargers' average of 3.2 yards per rush was the league's worst. Changes on the offensive line may have contributed: veteran tackle Stan Brock retired during the offseason, and center Courtney Hall suffered a career-ending injury mid-season.

Tony Martin continued to be the star receiver, catching 85 passes for 1171 yards. He managed 14 touchdowns, joint-most in the NFL, and tying Lance Alworth's club record. Ronnie Harmon was replaced as a pass-catching back by Terrell Fletcher, who caught only two fewer passes (61), but for 197 fewer yards (476). Stan Humphries was again the starting quarterback, but continued to sustain frequent injuries and missed three games.

With six time Pro Bowl defensive end Leslie O'Neal having left after a decade with the club, Junior Seau stepped up to be the club leader in both sacks and tackles (7.0 and 138 respectively). He also contributed two interceptions, forced one fumble and recovered three. Rodney Harrison continued to improve, leading the team with five interceptions and coming second to Seau with 125 tackles. Darren Bennett averaged 45.6 yards per punt, third best in the league.

For the second consecutive year, the Chargers suffered an offseason tragedy. Running back Rodney Culver was among the 110 victims of ValuJet Flight 592.

== Offseason ==
=== NFL draft ===
1996 San Diego Chargers draft
Round	Pick	Player	Position	College	Notes
2	41	Bryan Still	Wide receiver	Virginia Tech	
2	50	Patrick Sapp	Linebacker	Clemson	
3	81	Brian Roche	Tight end	San Jose State	
4	114	Charlie Jones	Wide receiver	Fresno State	
5	155	Junior Soli	Defensive tackle	Arkansas	
6	190	Jim Mills	Guard	Idaho	
6	192	Bryan Stoltenberg	Center	Colorado	
7	231	Freddie Bradley	Running back	Sonoma State	
Made roster * Made at least one Pro Bowl during career

== Personnel ==
=== Staff ===
1996 San Diego Chargers staff
Front office: chairman of the board – Alex Spanos; President and vice-chairman – Dean Spanos; general manager – Bobby Beathard; Director of player personnel – Billy Devaney; Director of pro personnel – Rudy Feldman; Coordinator of football operations – Marty Hurney; Head coaches: Head coach – Bobby Ross; Offensive coaches: Offensive coordinator – Ralph Friedgen; Quarterbacks – Dwain Painter; Offensive backs – Sylvester Croom; Wide receivers – Jerry Sullivan; Tight ends/h-backs – Frank Falks; Offensive line – Jack Henry; Offense and special teams assistant – Stan Kwan; Quality control – John Misciagna	Defensive coaches: Defensive coordinator – Dave Adolph; Defensive line – Brian Baker; Linebackers – Dale Lindsey; Secondary – Greg Brown; Defense and special teams assistant – Dennis Murphy; Special teams coaches: Special teams – Chuck Priefer; Strength and conditioning: Strength and conditioning – John Dunn; Strength and conditioning assistant – John Hastings

=== Roster ===
1996 San Diego Chargers roster
Quarterbacks (QB): 12 Stan Humphries; 8 Sean Salisbury; 5 Craig Whelihan; Running backs (RB): 33 Kevin Bouie; 35 Freddie Bradley; 41 Terrell Fletcher; 24 Aaron Hayden; 42 Leonard Russell; Wide receivers (WR): 83 Andre Coleman KR; 84 'Omar Ellison; 17 Charlie Jones; 81 Tony Martin; 80 Bryan Still; Tight ends (TE): 88 Deems May; 89 Shannon Mitchell; 46 Walter Reeves; 87 Brian Roche	Offensive linemen (OL): 75 Tony Berti T; 63 Joe Cocozzo G; 73 Isaac Davis G; 60 Greg Engel C; 66 Jim Mills T; 77 Eric Moten G; 70 Vaughn Parker T; 64 Bryan Stoltenberg C; 72 Harry Swayne T; Defensive linemen (DL): 90 Marco Coleman DE; 93 Reuben Davis DT; 95 Vernon Edwards DE; 99 Raylee Johnson DE; 98 Shawn Lee DT; 94 Chris Mims DE; 97 John Parrella DT; 96 Don Sasa DT	Linebackers (LB): 57 Arnold Ale OLB; 58 Lewis Bush OLB; 51 Joe Cummings MLB; 52 Dwayne Gordon MLB; 54 Kurt Gouveia MLB; 56 Patrick Sapp OLB; 55 Junior Seau OLB; Defensive backs (DB): 44 Eric Castle FS; 31 Willie Clark CB; 21 Darrien Gordon CB/PR; 28 Dwayne Harper CB; 37 Rodney Harrison SS; 38 David Hendrix SS; 40 Mark Montreuil CB; 36 Kevin Ross FS; 29 Terrance Shaw CB; Special teams (ST): 2 Darren Bennett P; 50 David Binn LS; 3 John Carney K	Practice squad: 79 Pat Ivey DE; 27 Michael Swift CB; 53 active, 6 inactive, 2 practice squad Reserve: 53 Courtney Hall C (IR); 46 Maurice Harrell TE (IR); 85 Jimmy Oliver WR (IR); 86 Alfred Pupunu TE (IR); 65 Troy Sienkiewicz G/T (IR); 59 Glen Young LB (IR); Rookies in italics

== Preseason ==
Week	Date	Opponent	Result	Record	Venue	Attendance
1	July 30	vs. Pittsburgh Steelers	W 20–10	1–0	Tokyo Dome (Tokyo, Japan)	
2	August 6	at Minnesota Vikings	L 20–23	1–1	Hubert H. Humphrey Metrodome	
3	August 13	at San Francisco 49ers	L 13–16	1–2	3Com Park	
4	August 18	Arizona Cardinals	W 32–10	2–2	Jack Murphy Stadium	
5	August 25	at St. Louis Rams	L 34–37	2–3	Trans World Dome	

== Regular season ==
=== Schedule ===
Week	Date	Opponent	Result	Record	Venue	Attendance
1	September 1	**Seattle Seahawks**	**W** 29–7	1–0	Jack Murphy Stadium	58,780
2	September 8	Cincinnati Bengals	**W** 27–14	2–0	Jack Murphy Stadium	55,880
3	September 15	at Green Bay Packers	**L** 10–42	2–1	Lambeau Field	60,584
4	September 22	at **Oakland Raiders**	**W** 40–34	3–1	Oakland–Alameda County Coliseum	49,097
5	September 29	**Kansas City Chiefs**	**W** 22–19	4–1	Jack Murphy Stadium	59,384
6	October 6	at **Denver Broncos**	**L** 17–28	4–2	Mile High Stadium	75,058
7	Bye					
8	October 21	**Oakland Raiders**	**L** 14–23	4–3	Jack Murphy Stadium	62,530
9	October 27	at **Seattle Seahawks**	**L** 13–32	4–4	Kingdome	38,143
10	November 3	at Indianapolis Colts	**W** 26–19	5–4	RCA Dome	58,484
11	November 11	Detroit Lions	**W** 27–21	6–4	Jack Murphy Stadium	60,425
12	November 17	Tampa Bay Buccaneers	**L** 17–25	6–5	Jack Murphy Stadium	57,526
13	November 24	at **Kansas City Chiefs**	**W** 28–14	7–5	Arrowhead Stadium	69,472
14	December 1	New England Patriots	**L** 7–45	7–6	Jack Murphy Stadium	59,209
15	December 8	at Pittsburgh Steelers	**L** 3–16	7–7	Three Rivers Stadium	56,368
16	December 14	at Chicago Bears	**L** 14–27	7–8	Soldier Field	49,763
17	December 22	**Denver Broncos**	**W** 16–10	8–8	Jack Murphy Stadium	46,801
Note: Intra-division opponents are in **bold** text.

=== Game summaries ===
==== Week 1: vs. Seattle Seahawks ====
Week One: Seattle Seahawks at San Diego Chargers – Game summary

Quarter	1	2	3	4	Total
Seahawks	0	7	0	0	**7**
Chargers	7	6	3	13	**29**

at Jack Murphy Stadium, San Diego, California

- Date: September 1
- Game time: 1:00 p.m. PDT
- Game weather: 74 °F (23.3 °C), relative humidity 80%, wind 7 mph
- Game attendance: 58,780
- Referee: Jerry Markbreit
- TV announcers (NBC): Jim Lampley and Bob Golic
- Box score

Game information

**First quarter**

- SDG – Tony Martin 2-yard pass from Stan Humphries (John Carney kick), 2:15. Chargers 7–0. **Drive: 13 plays, 80 yards, 6:28.**

**Second quarter**

- SEA – Rick Mirer 6-yard run (Todd Peterson kick), 12:01. Tied 7–7. **Drive: 11 plays, 76 yards, 5:14.**
- SDG – John Carney 35-yard field goal, 1:26. Chargers 10–7. **Drive: 13 plays, 53 yards, 4:55.**
- SDG – John Carney 53-yard field goal, 0:00. Chargers 13–7. **Drive: 5 plays, 25 yards, 0:22.**

**Third quarter**

- SDG – John Carney 22-yard field goal, 2:34. Chargers 16–7. **Drive: 10 plays, 56 yards, 5:47.**

**Fourth quarter**

- SDG – John Carney 50-yard field goal, 13:34. Chargers 19–7. **Drive: 6 plays, 17 yards, 1:48.**
- SDG – Leonard Russell 6-yard run (John Carney kick), 11:39. Chargers 26–7. **Drive: 5 plays, 16 yards, 1:46.**
- SDG – John Carney 31-yard field goal, 10:28. Chargers 29–7. **Drive: 4 plays, 1 yard, 0:54.**

**Top passers**

- SEA – Rick Mirer – 24/41, 251 yards, 2 INT
- SDG – Stan Humphries – 20/38, 195 yards, TD

**Top rushers**

- SEA – Chris Warren – 13 rushes, 50 yards
- SDG – Aaron Hayden – 11 rushes, 59 yards

**Top receivers**

- SEA – Joey Galloway – 4 receptions, 89 yards
- SDG – Tony Martin – 7 receptions, 66 yards, TD

Touchdowns by Tony Martin and Leonard Russell, plus five field goals by John Carney saw the Chargers to an easy win on opening day. The running attack gave what was to prove its strongest showing, with Leonard Russell, Aaron Hayden and Terrell Fletcher splitting the carries, and each contributing to a team total of 186 yards (the Chargers would gain 100+ yards on the ground only four more times all year). When the Seahawks tried to play catch-up in the second half, San Diego's defense capitalised with four turnovers.

==== Week 2: vs. Cincinnati Bengals ====
Week Two: Cincinnati Bengals at San Diego Chargers – Game summary

Quarter	1	2	3	4	Total
Bengals	0	7	0	7	**14**
Chargers	7	7	3	10	**27**

at Jack Murphy Stadium, San Diego, California

- Date: September 8
- Game time: 1:00 p.m. PDT
- Game weather: 74 °F (23.3 °C), relative humidity 76%, wind 9 mph
- Game attendance: 55,880
- Referee: Dick Hantak
- TV announcers (NBC): Jim Lampley and Bob Golic
- Box score

Game information

**First quarter**

- SDG – Leonard Russell 1-yard run (John Carney kick), 2:11. Chargers 7–0. **Drive: 12 plays, 76 yards, 6:01.**

**Second quarter**

- SDG – Tony Martin 21-yard pass from Stan Humphries (John Carney kick), 10:52. Chargers 14–0. **Drive: 11 plays, 71 yards, 5:07.**
- CIN – Carl Pickens 27-yard pass from Jeff Blake (Doug Pelfrey kick), 1:53. Chargers 14–7. **Drive: 9 plays, 93 yards, 3:31.**

**Third quarter**

- SDG – John Carney 47-yard field goal, 10:39. Chargers 17–7. **Drive: 11 plays, 51 yards, 4:21.**

**Fourth quarter**

- SDG – John Carney 23-yard field goal, 13:13. Chargers 20–7. **Drive: 4 plays, 5 yards, 1:17.**
- SDG – Leonard Russell 1-yard run (John Carney kick), 11:51. Chargers 27–7. **Drive: 3 plays, 3 yards, 1:04.**
- CIN – Tony McGee 12-yard pass from Erik Wilhelm (Doug Pelfrey kick), 2:01. Chargers 27–14. **Drive: 6 plays, 49 yards, 3:56.**

**Top passers**

- CIN – Jeff Blake – 14/33, 163 yards, TD, INT
- SDG – Stan Humphries – 27/41, 275 yards, TD, INT

**Top rushers**

- CIN – Erik Wilhelm – 2 rushes, 22 yards
- SDG – Leonard Russell – 16 rushes, 62 yards, 2 TD

**Top receivers**

- CIN – Carl Pickens – 4 receptions, 63 yards, TD
- SDG – Tony Martin – 9 receptions, 96 yards, TD

The Chargers started strongly, going 76 and 71 yards on consecutive drives capped by touchdowns for Russell and Martin. However, the Bengals came back into it before halftime when Carl Pickens scored; Humphries then threw an interception with San Diego poised to respond. Up 17-7 through three-quarters, the Chargers then got two big plays to put the game away. Firstly, Darrien Gordon's 64-yard punt return set up a short field goal; on the Bengals' next play from scrimmage Kurt Gouveia intercepted Jeff Blake, and Russell soon punched it in from the one.

==== Week 3: at Green Bay Packers ====
Week Three: San Diego Chargers at Green Bay Packers – Game summary

Quarter	1	2	3	4	Total
Chargers	3	0	0	7	**10**
Packers	7	14	7	14	**42**

at Lambeau Field, Green Bay, Wisconsin

- Date: September 15
- Game time: 12:00 p.m. CDT
- Game weather: 55 °F (12.8 °C), relative humidity 80%, wind 9 mph
- Game attendance: 60,584
- Referee: Howard Roe
- TV announcers (NBC): Charlie Jones and Randy Cross
- Box score

Game information

**First quarter**

- GB – Edgar Bennett 10-yard run (Chris Jacke kick), 9:51. Packers 7–0. **Drive: 6 plays, 55 yards, 3:31.**
- SDG – John Carney 43-yard field goal, 1:05. Packers 7–3. **Drive: 10 plays, 55 yards, 5:06.**

**Second quarter**

- GB – Antonio Freeman 19-yard pass from Brett Favre (Chris Jacke kick), 12:52. Packers 14–3. **Drive: 6 plays, 80 yards, 3:13.**
- GB – William Henderson 8-yard pass from Brett Favre (Chris Jacke kick), 1:13. Packers 21–3. **Drive: 17 plays, 88 yards, 9:24.**

**Third quarter**

- GB – Keith Jackson 7-yard pass from Brett Favre (Chris Jacke kick), 1:52. Packers 28–3. **Drive: 9 plays, 50 yards, 5:27.**

**Fourth quarter**

- SDG – Tony Martin 9-yard pass from Stan Humphries (John Carney kick), 8:16. Packers 28–10. **Drive: 4 plays, 26 yards, 1:18.**
- GB – LeRoy Butler 90-yard interception return (Chris Jacke kick), 6:31. Packers 35–10.
- GB – Desmond Howard 65-yard punt return (Chris Jacke kick), 4:59. Packers 42–10.

**Top passers**

- SDG – Stan Humphries – 16/31, 130 yards, TD, 2 INT
- GB – Brett Favre – 22/33, 231 yards, 3 TD, INT

**Top rushers**

- SDG – Leonard Russell – 9 rushes, 27 yards
- GB – Edgar Bennett – 13 rushes, 65 yards, TD

**Top receivers**

- SDG – Tony Martin – 3 receptions, 38 yards, TD
- GB – Robert Brooks – 8 receptions, 108 yards

The Chargers were brought back down to Earth, as the eventual Super Bowl champions dominated in all phases of the game. Edgar Bennett scored on the Packers' opening drive, and Brett Favre followed up with 3 touchdown passes as Green Bay built a 28–3 lead through three-quarters. San Diego then had a brief revival, with Willie Clark recovering a Favre fumble to set up a Humphries-to-Martin TD pass, and Lewis Bush recovering a Bennett fumble in Packers' territory on the next play. However, LeRoy Butler ended the threat with an interception and 90-yard touchdown return, and there was still time for Desmond Howard to add a special teams touchdown on a 65-yard punt return.

This was San Diego's heaviest loss since a 48-10 reverse against San Francisco eight seasons earlier.

==== Week 4: at Oakland Raiders ====
Week Four: San Diego Chargers at Oakland Raiders – Game summary

Quarter	1	2	3	4	Total
Chargers	21	6	0	13	**40**
Raiders	0	14	7	13	**34**

at Oakland-Alameda County Coliseum, Oakland, California

- Date: September 22
- Game time: 1:00 p.m. PDT
- Game weather: 62 °F (16.7 °C), relative humidity 74%, wind 11 mph
- Game attendance: 49,097
- Referee: Bernie Kukar
- TV announcers (NBC): Charlie Jones and Randy Cross
- Box score

Game information

**First quarter**

- SDG – Terrell Fletcher 6-yard pass from Stan Humphries (John Carney kick), 4:03. Chargers 7–0. **Drive: 5 plays, 27 yards, 2:04.**
- SDG – Tony Martin 7-yard pass from Stan Humphries (John Carney kick), 3:05. Chargers 14–0. **Drive: 2 plays, 11 yards, 0:40.**
- SDG – Tony Martin 41-yard pass from Stan Humphries (John Carney kick), 0:58. Chargers 21–0. **Drive: 1 play, 41 yards, 0:06.**

**Second quarter**

- OAK – Derrick Fenner 4-yard pass from Jeff Hostetler (Cole Ford kick), 14:11. Chargers 21–7. **Drive: 5 plays, 60 yards, 1:47.**
- SDG – John Carney 28-yard field goal, 9:21. Chargers 24–7. **Drive: 10 plays, 70 yards, 4:50.**
- OAK – Rickey Dudley 6-yard pass from Jeff Hostetler (Cole Ford kick), 7:11. Chargers 24–14. **Drive: 4 plays, 80 yards, 2:10.**
- SDG – John Carney 39-yard field goal, 1:04. Chargers 27–14. **Drive: 5 plays, 34 yards, 1:17.**

**Third quarter**

- OAK – Tim Brown 6-yard pass from Jeff Hostetler (Cole Ford kick), 5:41. Chargers 27–21. **Drive: 13 plays, 63 yards, 5:39.**

**Fourth quarter**

- SDG – Tony Martin 19-yard pass from Stan Humphries (run failed), 8:04. Chargers 33–21. **Drive: 14 plays, 80 yards, 6:56.**
- SDG – Willie Clark 83-yard interception return (John Carney kick), 3:40. Chargers 40–21.
- OAK – Tim Brown 11-yard pass from Billy Joe Hobert (passed failed), 1:29. Chargers 40–27. **Drive: 8 plays, 79 yards, 2:11.**
- OAK – Kenny Shedd 28-yard pass from Billy Joe Hobert (Cole Ford kick), 0:12. Chargers 40–34. **Drive: 7 plays, 57 yards, 1:17.**

**Top passers**

- SDG – Stan Humphries – 18/25, 226 yards, 4 TD
- OAK – Jeff Hostetler – 26/44, 293 yards, 3 TD, 2 INT

**Top rushers**

- SDG – Leonard Russell – 19 rushes, 63 yards
- OAK – Napoleon Kaufman – 7 rushes, 116 yards

**Top receivers**

- SDG – Tony Martin – 10 receptions, 138 yards, 3 TD
- OAK – Tim Brown – 11 receptions, 120 yards, 2 TD

San Diego bounced back with victory in a back-and-forth shootout. The Chargers broke the game open late in the 1st quarter when Stan Humphries threw touchdown on three consecutive pass attempts. Firstly, a 35-yard punt return by Darrien Gordon set up a 27-yard scoring drive, with Humphries finding Terrell Fletcher to open the scoring. Kurt Gouveia intercepted Jeff Hostetler's next pass, leading to an even shorter drive, with Martin scoring the Chargers' second touchdown. Shortly afterwards, Rodney Harrison's fumble recovery was followed immediately by another Humphries-to-Martin score, from 41 yards out. The three touchdowns came within a span of only 3:05.

Hostetler then led a Raider comeback, throwing three touchdowns during the 2nd and 3rd quarters, while the Chargers could only manage a pair of Carney kicks. Down only 27–21, Oakland drive inside the San Diego 10, but the drive stalled and Cole Ford missed a 25-yard field goal as the 3rd quarter ended.

The Chargers then drove 80 yards the other way, Humphries finding Martin for another touchdown. Hostetler quickly drove back into scoring position, but Willie Clark intercepted his 4th down pass and ran it back 83 yards for a 40–21 lead with 3:40 to play. Oakland managed two quick touchdowns either side of an onside kick recovery, before Alfred Pupunu recovered a further onside attempt to clinch the win.

Humphries completed 18 of 25 passes for 226 yards, with a career-high four touchdowns and no interceptions. Martin had 10 receptions for 138 yards and three scores. San Diego set a club record for most yardage conceded in a win with 553; they managed only 321 themselves but won the turnover battle 3–0.

==== Week 5: vs. Kansas City Chiefs ====
Week Five: Kansas City Chiefs at San Diego Chargers – Game summary

Quarter	1	2	3	4	Total
Chiefs	0	9	7	3	**19**
Chargers	6	0	10	6	**22**

at Jack Murphy Stadium, San Diego, California

- Date: September 29
- Game time: 1:00 p.m. PDT
- Game weather: 66 °F (18.9 °C), relative humidity 86%, wind 8 mph
- Game attendance: 59,384
- Referee: Ed Hochuli
- TV announcers (NBC): Marv Albert and Sam Wyche
- Box score

Game information

**First quarter**

- SDG – John Carney 33-yard field goal, 7:44. Chargers 3–0. **Drive: 13 plays, 65 yards, 6:03.**
- SDG – John Carney 38-yard field goal, 0:46. Chargers 6–0. **Drive: 7 plays, 32 yards, 2:23.**

**Second quarter**

- KAN – Pete Stoyanovich 44-yard field goal, 12:17. Chargers 6–3. **Drive: 4 plays, 5 yards, 1:46.**
- KAN – Pete Stoyanovich 26-yard field goal, 2:48. Tied 6–6. **Drive: 7 plays, 40 yards, 2:53.**
- KAN – Pete Stoyanovich 26-yard field goal, 0:23. Chiefs 9–6. **Drive: 7 plays, 48 yards, 1:01.**

**Third quarter**

- SDG – John Carney 44-yard field goal, 10:13. Tied 9–9. **Drive: 12 plays, 54 yards, 4:47.**
- SDG – Darrien Gordon 81-yard punt return (John Carney kick), 7:14. Chargers 16–9.
- KAN – Reggie Johnson 3-yard pass from Steve Bono (Pete Stoyanovich kick), 6:07. Tied 16–16. **Drive: 2 plays, 62 yards, 1:07.**

**Fourth quarter**

- SDG – John Carney 39-yard field goal, 12:06. Chargers 19–16. **Drive: 9 plays, 61 yards, 3:17.**
- KAN – Pete Stoyanovich 32-yard field goal, 9:50. Tied 19–19. **Drive: 6 plays, 14 yards, 2:16.**
- SDG – John Carney 33-yard field goal, 3:17. Chargers 22–19. **Drive: 7 plays, 21 yards, 2:33.**

**Top passers**

- KAN – Steve Bono – 25/53, 280 yards, TD, 2 INT
- SDG – Stan Humphries – 19/41, 238 yards

**Top rushers**

- KAN – Marcus Allen – 9 rushes, 35 yards
- SDG – Leonard Russell – 14 rushes, 50 yards

**Top receivers**

- KAN – Marcus Allen – 6 receptions, 88 yards
- SDG – Alfred Pupunu – 5 receptions, 83 yards

A pair of Junior Seau interceptions helped the Chargers past the previously undefeated Chiefs. In a battle of field goals, Seau's first pick led to Carney's second, and a 6–0 lead. However, a fumbled punt return by Darrien Gordon set up the first of three successes by Pete Stoyanovich in the 2nd quarter.

After Carney tied the game at 9–9 in the 3rd quarter, Gordon atoned for his earlier error with an 81-yard punt return touchdown. However, Marcus Allen's 59-yard reception on the next play from scrimmage set an immediate Chiefs' response. Following a further exchange of field goals, Seau intercepted Steve Bono for the second time, and Carney kicked the winner from 33 yards out with 3:17 to play. A Seau sack was then instrumental in forcing Kansas City to turn the ball over on downs, but Russell fumbled on the next play. Given a bonus chance, Bono led his team into field goal range, but Chris Mims blocked the game-tying attempt.

The nine successful field goals were a record (since surpassed). Following this result, Denver, San Diego and Kansas City were tied atop the AFC West with 4-1 records.

==== Week 6: at Denver Broncos ====
Week Six: San Diego Chargers at Denver Broncos – Game summary

Quarter	1	2	3	4	Total
Chargers	3	14	0	0	**17**
Broncos	0	7	14	7	**28**

at Mile High Stadium, Denver, Colorado

- Date: October 6
- Game time: 2:00 p.m. MDT
- Game weather: 60 °F (15.6 °C), relative humidity 44%, wind 9 mph
- Game attendance: 75,058
- Referee: Bob McElwee
- TV announcers (NBC): Dick Enberg, Paul Maguire and Phil Simms
- Box score

Game information

**First quarter**

- SDG – John Carney 27-yard field goal, 6:40. Chargers 3–0. **Drive: 8 plays, 72 yards, 3:27.**

**Second quarter**

- SDG – Terrell Fletcher 5-yard pass from Stan Humphries (John Carney kick), 6:54. Chargers 10–0. **Drive: 5 plays, 44 yards, 2:58.**
- SDG – Tony Martin 6-yard pass from Stan Humphries (John Carney kick), 2:51. Chargers 17–0. **Drive: 6 plays, 64 yards, 2:16.**
- DEN – Shannon Sharpe 20-yard pass from John Elway (Jason Elam kick), 1:19. Chargers 17–7. **Drive: 5 plays, 80 yards, 1:32.**

**Third quarter**

- DEN – Shannon Sharpe 20-yard pass from John Elway (Jason Elam kick), 8:35. Chargers 17–14. **Drive: 7 plays, 64 yards, 2:51.**
- DEN – Shannon Sharpe 3-yard pass from John Elway (Jason Elam kick), 3:03. Broncos 21–17. **Drive: 7 plays, 53 yards, 3:07.**

**Fourth quarter**

- DEN – Ed McCaffrey 9-yard pass from John Elway (Jason Elam kick), 8:22. Broncos 28–17. **Drive: 12 plays, 62 yards, 6:29.**

**Top passers**

- SDG – Stan Humphries – 23/35, 237 yards, 2 TD
- DEN – John Elway – 32/41, 323 yards, 4 TD, INT

**Top rushers**

- SDG – Leonard Russell – 11 rushes, 24 yards
- DEN – Terrell Davis – 7 rushes, 50 yards

**Top receivers**

- SDG – Alfred Pupunu – 5 receptions, 81 yards
- DEN – Shannon Sharpe – 13 receptions, 153 yards, 3 TD

A collapse from 17-0 ahead cost San Diego victory in a pivotal game. Up 3–0 in the second quarter, Rodney Harrison's first interception of the season set up a short touchdown pass from Humphries to Terrell Fletcher; Humphries found Martin for another score shortly afterwards. John Elway responded immediately, leading his team 80 yards in just five plays, the last 20 coming on a 20-yard strike to Shannon Sharpe shortly before halftime.

In the 3rd quarter, the same pairing hooked up twice more, putting Denver four points ahead. San Diego tried to respond, but Humphries threw incomplete on 4th and 7 at the Broncos' 38, and Elway soon put the game away with his fourth touchdown pass, this time to Ed McCaffrey. This result put Denver alone atop the AFC West, and they wouldn't lose again until after they'd clinched home field advantage through the playoffs.

==== Week 8: vs. Oakland Raiders ====
Week Eight: Oakland Raiders at San Diego Chargers – Game summary

Quarter	1	2	3	4	Total
Raiders	7	3	10	3	**23**
Chargers	7	0	0	7	**14**

at Jack Murphy Stadium, San Diego, California

- Date: October 21
- Game time: 6:00 p.m. PDT
- Game weather: 66 °F (18.9 °C), relative humidity 54%, wind 7 mph
- Game attendance: 62,350
- Referee: Ron Blum
- TV announcers (ABC): Al Michaels, Frank Gifford and Dan Dierdorf
- Box score

Game information

**First quarter**

- OAK – Napoleon Kaufman 12 yard-run (Cole Ford kick), 11:59. Raiders 7–0. **Drive: 6 plays, 57 yards, 2:26.**
- SDG – Tony Martin 11-yard pass from Sean Salisbury (John Carney kick), 0:03. Tied 7–7. **Drive: 10 plays, 72 yards, 5:30.**

**Second quarter**

- OAK – Cole Ford 36-yard field goal, 11:27. Raiders 10–7. **Drive: 8 plays, 40 yards, 3:36.**

**Third quarter**

- OAK – Derrick Fenner 17-yard pass from Jeff Hostetler (Cole Ford kick), 8:02. Raiders 17–7. **Drive: 8 plays, 65 yards, 5:01.**
- OAK – Cole Ford 32-yard field goal, 3:12. Raiders 20–7. **Drive: 6 plays, 3 yards, 3:52.**

**Fourth quarter**

- SDG – Tony Martin 12-yard pass from Sean Salisbury (John Carney kick), 13:05. Raiders 20–14. **Drive: 13 plays, 79 yards, 5:07.**
- OAK – Cole Ford 34-yard field goal, 2:11. Raiders 23–14. **Drive: 5 plays, 3 yards, 1:42.**

**Top passers**

- OAK – Jeff Hostetler – 20/33, 191 yards, TD, INT
- SDG – Sean Salisbury – 22/35, 252 yards, 2 TD, INT

**Top rushers**

- OAK – Napoleon Kaufman – 3 rushes, 56 yards, TD
- SDG – Leonard Russell – 13 rushes, 19 yards

**Top receivers**

- OAK – Tim Brown – 5 receptions, 68 yards, 2 TD
- SDG – Tony Martin – 5 receptions, 81 yards, 2 TD

San Diego lost both the game and their starting QB on Monday Night Football. With his side down 7–0 in the 1st quarter, Humphries was hit by Chester McGlockton at the end of a 5-yard scramble and dislocated his left shoulder; backup Sean Salisbury came in and finished the drive with an 11-yard touchdown pass to Martin. Salisbury later fumbled while being sacked by McGlockton in Raider territory, and Oakland kicked a field goal for a 20–7 lead; San Diego bounced back quickly, with Salisbury and Martin hooking up from 12 yards out to pull it back to 20–14. However, Darrien Gordon muffed a punt in the final four minutes, and Oakland hit the clinching field goal.

Salisbury finished 22 of 35, for 235 yards, two touchdowns and one interception.

==== Week 9: at Seattle Seahawks ====
Week Nine: San Diego Chargers at Seattle Seahawks – Game summary

Quarter	1	2	3	4	Total
Chargers	3	3	0	7	**13**
Seahawks	3	17	3	9	**32**

at Kingdome, Seattle, Washington

- Date: October 27
- Game time: 1:00 p.m. PST
- Game weather: Dome
- Game attendance: 38,143
- Referee: Walt Coleman
- TV announcers (NBC): Jim Lampley and Bob Golic
- Box score

Game information

**First quarter**

- SEA – Todd Peterson 33-yard field goal, 11:15. Seahawks 3–0. **Drive: 8 plays, 65 yards, 3:45.**
- SDG – John Carney 41-yard field goal, 7:00. Tied 3–3. **Drive: 10 plays, 35 yards, 4:15.**

**Second quarter**

- SDG – John Carney 43-yard field goal, 13:30. Chargers 6–3. **Drive: 10 plays, 54 yards, 5:05.**
- SEA – Todd Peterson 44-yard field goal, 11:00. Tied 6–6. **Drive: 7 plays, 41 yards, 2:30.**
- SEA – Lamar Smith 10-yard run (Todd Peterson kick), 6:42. Seahawks 13–6. **Drive: 4 plays, 74 yards, 2:08.**
- SEA – Darryl Williams 79-yard interception return (Todd Peterson kick), 2:39. Seahawks 20–6.

**Third quarter**

- SEA – Todd Peterson 47-yard field goal, 4:17. Seahawks 23–6. **Drive: 7 plays, 31 yards, 2:50.**

**Fourth quarter**

- SEA – Todd Peterson 27-yard field goal, 13:45. Seahawks 26–6. **Drive: 5 plays, 5 yards, 2:07.**
- SDG – Charlie Jones 27-yard pass from Sean Salisbury (John Carney kick), 12:36. Seahawks 26–13. **Drive: 4 plays, 80 yards, 1:09.**
- SEA – Chris Warren 37-yard run (run failed), 4:48. Seahawks 32–13. **Drive: 2 plays, 41 yards, 0:50.**

**Top passers**

- SDG – Sean Salisbury – 21/43, 291 yards, TD, 4 INT
- SEA – John Friesz – 16/33, 206 yards

**Top rushers**

- SDG – Terrell Fletcher – 8 rushes, 36 yards
- SEA – Chris Warren – 19 rushes, 146 yards, TD

**Top receivers**

- SDG – Charlie Jones – 7 receptions, 79 yards, TD
- SEA – Brian Blades – 4 receptions, 66 yards

San Diego's five-game winning streak against the Seahawks came to an end in a one-sided encounter. The Chargers were missing their leaders on both sides of the ball, with Seau and Humphries out injured. Seattle running back Chris Warren took advantage of the former's absence with 146 yards and a touchdown, while Salisbury struggled in his first start, throwing four interceptions (one of those a pick six), against a single touchdown.

==== Week 10: at Indianapolis Colts ====
Week Ten: San Diego Chargers at Indianapolis Colts – Game summary

Quarter	1	2	3	4	Total
Chargers	7	9	3	7	**26**
Colts	0	6	6	7	**19**

at RCA Dome, Indianapolis, Indiana

- Date: November 3
- Game time: 1:00 p.m. EST
- Game weather: Dome
- Game attendance: 58,484
- Referee: Howard Roe
- TV announcers (NBC): Tom Hammond, Bob Trumpy and Sam Wyche
- Box score

Game information

**First quarter**

- SDG – Charlie Jones 41-yard pass from Sean Salisbury (John Carney kick), 1:12. Chargers 7–0. **Drive: 3 plays, 45 yards, 1:09.**

**Second quarter**

- SDG – John Carney 28-yard field goal, 14:55. Chargers 10–0. **Drive: 4 plays, -7 yards, 1:15.**
- SDG – John Carney 30-yard field goal, 10:43. Chargers 13–0. **Drive: 5 plays, 51 yards, 1:05.**
- IND – Cary Blanchard 47-yard field goal, 5:08. Chargers 13–3. **Drive: 9 plays, 47 yards, 5:35.**
- IND – Cary Blanchard 39-yard field goal, 1:03. Chargers 13–6. **Drive: 9 plays, 30 yards, 2:23.**
- SDG – John Carney 47-yard field goal, 0:12. Chargers 16–6. **Drive: 7 plays, 45 yards, 0:51.**

**Third quarter**

- SDG – John Carney 22-yard field goal, 9:27. Chargers 19–6. **Drive: 12 plays, 59 yards, 5:33.**
- IND – Cary Blanchard 33-yard field goal, 5:37. Chargers 19–9. **Drive: 9 plays, 59 yards, 3:50.**
- IND – Cary Blanchard 20-yard field goal, 2:46. Chargers 19–12. **Drive: 6 plays, 4 yards, 0:58.**

**Fourth quarter**

- SDG – Tony Martin 22-yard pass from Sean Salisbury (John Carney kick), 12:43. Chargers 26–12. **Drive: 6 plays, 42 yards, 2:09.**
- IND – Marvin Harrison 9-yard pass from Jim Harbaugh (Cary Blanchard kick), 3:20. Chargers 26–19. **Drive: 5 plays, 53 yards, 2:02.**

**Top passers**

- SDG – Sean Salisbury – 19/31, 237 yards, 2 TD
- IND – Jim Harbaugh – 18/44, 203 yards, TD, 4 INT

**Top rushers**

- SDG – Leonard Russell – 17 rushes, 53 yards
- IND – Jim Harbaugh – 6 rushes, 42 yards

**Top receivers**

- SDG – Tony Martin – 6 receptions, 128 yards, TD
- IND – Sean Dawkins – 5 receptions, 63 yards

Five turnovers helped San Diego to a much-needed win. Colts' QB Jim Harbaugh was intercepted by four different players in the first half — he had thrown only two all season coming in — and the Chargers converted the errors into a Charlie Jones touchdown reception and a pair of field goals. These were the first in a sequence of eight fields, four by each team, culminating in a Colts 20-yarder that made it 19–12; Indianapolis almost had a touchdown before that last kick, but punter Darren Bennett brought down Ray Buchanan at the nine after an 82-yard return.

Indianapolis were driving at the start of the 4th quarter, but Junior Seau sacked Harbaugh, causing a fumble which Chris Mims recovered. Tony Martin doubled the lead six plays later. The Colts then embarked on a 17 play drive, but turned the ball over on downs after having 1st and goal at the one. They did score on their next drive, but San Diego then picked up a pair of 1st downs to kill all but five seconds of the clock.

Sean Salisbury was much improved, going 19 of 31 for 237 yards and two touchdowns. Martin had 128 yards on just 6 receptions. San Diego committed 15 penalties (a club record at the time) for 135 yards.

==== Week 11: vs. Detroit Lions ====
Week Eleven: Detroit Lions at San Diego Chargers – Game summary

Quarter	1	2	3	4	Total
Lions	7	7	0	7	**21**
Chargers	7	10	7	3	**27**

at Jack Murphy Stadium, San Diego, California

- Date: November 11
- Game time: 6:00 p.m. PST
- Game weather: 67 °F (19.4 °C), relative humidity 48%, wind 4 mph
- Game attendance: 60,425
- Referee: Dale Hamer
- TV announcers (ABC): Al Michaels, Frank Gifford and Dan Dierdorf
- Box score

Game information

**First quarter**

- SDG – Tony Martin 32-yard pass from Stan Humphries (John Carney kick), 5:00. Chargers 7–0. **Drive: 10 plays, 63 yards, 5:49.**
- DET – Barry Sanders 2-yard run (Jason Hanson kick), 1:47. Tied 7–7. **Drive: 7 plays, 75 yards, 3:13.**

**Second quarter**

- DET – Barry Sanders 11-yard run (Jason Hanson kick), 13:40. Lions 14–7. **Drive: 5 plays, 66 yards, 2:03.**
- SDG – John Carney 29-yard field goal, 6:27. Lions 14–10. **Drive: 14 plays, 65 yards, 7:13.**
- SDG – Andre Coleman 46-yard pass from Stan Humphries (John Carney kick), 0:00. Chargers 17–14. **Drive: 5 plays, 57 yards, 1:21.**

**Third quarter**

- SDG – Alfred Pupunu 9-yard pass from Stan Humphries (John Carney kick), 8:44. Chargers 24–14. **Drive: 8 plays, 56 yards, 4:30.**

**Fourth quarter**

- SDG – John Carney 20-yard field goal, 12:24. Chargers 27–14. **Drive: 15 plays, 65 yards, 8:08.**
- DET – Brett Perriman 1-yard pass from Don Majkowski (Jason Hanson kick), 1:52. Chargers 27–21. **Drive: 13 plays, 61 yards, 2:44.**

**Top passers**

- DET – Don Majkowski – 10/18, 110 yards, TD
- SDG – Stan Humphries – 24/32, 311 yards, 3 TD

**Top rushers**

- DET – Barry Sanders – 16 rushes, 51 yards, 2 TD
- SDG – Leonard Russell – 20 rushes, 80 yards

**Top receivers**

- DET – Brett Perriman – 7 receptions, 70 yards, TD
- SDG – Tony Martin – 8 receptions, 113 yards, TD

Stan Humphries had a successful return to the starting lineup, and San Diego overcame another slew of penalties to win their second straight. After Humphries found Martin for a 32-yard touchdown on 2nd and 24, Barry Sanders scored touchdowns on consecutive drives to put Detroit ahead. The Lions led 14–10 on the stroke of halftime, but Humphries lofted a high pass into the end zone as the clock ran out, which eluded several Detroit defenders and nestled in the arms of Andre Coleman for a 46-yard touchdown. It was the second time Humphries had completed a Hail Mary pass on Monday Night Football, having done the same against Miami three seasons earlier.

San Diego carried their momentum on into the second half, where Alfred Pupunu caught a touchdown on their first drive, and Carney kick a field goal on their second. Carney had the chance to make the game almost safe with 5 minutes to play, but missed a 49 yarder, and Don Majkowski led Detroit the other way for a touchdown. An onside kick recovery by Junior Seau allowed San Diego to run out all but 9 seconds of the clock.

Humphries went 24 of 32 for 311 yards, three touchdowns and no interceptions. Martin had 8 grabs for 113 yards and a score. Leonard Russell had his most productive day as a Charger, with 80 yards on the ground and a further 33 through the air. San Diego outgained Detroit 406–222, but were flagged for 129 yards on 11 penalties; on the three Lions touchdown drives, penalties outcounted for 35, 30 and 24 yards respectively.

==== Week 12: vs. Tampa Bay Buccaneers ====
Week Twelve: Tampa Bay Buccaneers at San Diego Chargers – Game summary

Quarter	1	2	3	4	Total
Buccaneers	3	10	0	12	**25**
Chargers	14	0	3	0	**17**

at Jack Murphy Stadium, San Diego, California

- Date: November 17
- Game time: 1:00 p.m. PST
- Game weather: 58 °F (14.4 °C), relative humidity 78%, wind 7 mph
- Game attendance: 57,526
- Referee: Red Cashion
- TV announcers (FOX): Thom Brennaman and Ron Pitts
- Box score

Game information

**First quarter**

- SDG – Charlie Jones 63-yard pass from Stan Humphries (John Carney kick), 13:35. Chargers 7–0. **Drive: 3 plays, 70 yards, 1:25.**
- SDG – Leonard Russell 14-yard run (John Carney kick), 4:12. Chargers 14–0. **Drive: 1 plays, 14 yards, 0:02.**
- TB – Michael Husted 33-yard field goal, 0:44. Chargers 14–3. **Drive: 7 plays, 50 yards, 3:28.**

**Second quarter**

- TB – Mike Alstott 4-yard run (Michael Husted kick), 7:15. Chargers 14–10. **Drive: 12 plays, 72 yards, 6:20.**
- TB – Michael Husted 29-yard field goal, 0:00. Chargers 14–13. **Drive: 8 plays, 55 yards, 1:27.**

**Third quarter**

- SDG – John Carney 42-yard field goal, 7:17. Chargers 17–13. **Drive: 8 plays, 56 yards, 3:22.**

**Fourth quarter**

- TB – Michael Husted 27-yard field goal, 8:32. Chargers 17–16. **Drive: 4 plays, 4 yards, 1:36.**
- TB – Errict Rhett 1-yard run (pass failed), 6:02. Buccaneers 22–17. **Drive: 4 plays, 18 yards, 2:05.**
- TB – Michael Husted 19-yard field goal, 1:11. Buccaneers 25–17. **Drive: 10 plays, 33 yards, 3:47.**

**Top passers**

- TB – Trent Dilfer – 30/40, 327 yards, INT
- SDG – Stan Humphries – 15/33, 203 yards, TD, 3 INT

**Top rushers**

- TB – Mike Alstott – 9 rushes, 39 yards, 2 TD
- SDG – Leonard Russell – 14 rushes, 76 yards, TD

**Top receivers**

- TB – Courtney Hawkins – 7 receptions, 94 yards
- SDG – Charlie Jones – 1 reception, 63 yards, TD

San Diego suffered a shock defeat against the Buccaneers, who were 2-8 coming in, had lost ten consecutive road games, and had zero wins against the Chargers from six previous attempts.

The game started well for San Diego, with Charlie Jones turning a short crossing pattern into a 63-yard touchdown only three plays in. After Tampa Bay missed a short field goal, the Chargers recovered a muffed punt and scored via Russell a play later. The Buccaneers pulled it back to 14–10 over their next two drives, then began to miss numerous chances: Trent Dilfer was stuffed attempting a QB sneak on 4th and 1 from the San Diego 30; Alvin Harper dropped a pass in the end zone, forcing his team to settle for a field goal as the first half ended; following a Humphries interception, Dilfer was sacked by Chris Mims on 1st and 10 from the Charger 17, and Reuben Davis recovered; following a San Diego field goal, the Buccaneers executed a fake punt and reached 1st and 5 from the Charger 20, but Dilfer threw it straight to Rodney Harrison in the end zone.

In the 4th quarter, Tampa Bay finally turned their superiority into points, with two more Humphries interceptions leading to 9 points. A further field goal made it 25–17 with 2:11 to play. San Diego made it as far as the Tampa 30 in response, but Humphries threw three incompletions as time expired.

==== Week 13: at Kansas City Chiefs ====
Week Thirteen: San Diego Chargers at Kansas City Chiefs – Game summary

Quarter	1	2	3	4	Total
Chargers	7	14	7	0	**28**
Chiefs	0	0	0	14	**14**

at Jack Murphy Stadium, San Diego, California

- Date: November 24
- Game time: 12:00 p.m. CST
- Game weather: 27 °F (−2.8 °C), relative humidity 91%, wind 16 mph, wind chill 15
- Game attendance: 69,472
- Referee: Johnny Grier
- TV announcers (NBC): Don Criqui and Beasley Reece
- Box score

Game information

**First quarter**

- SDG – Tony Martin 20-yard pass from Stan Humphries (John Carney kick), 6:24. Chargers 7–0. **Drive: 4 plays, 28 yards, 1:23.**

**Second quarter**

- SDG – Leonard Russell 4-yard run (John Carney kick), 11:07. Chargers 14–0. **Drive: 10 plays, 97 yards, 5:20.**
- SDG – Tony Martin 10-yard pass from Stan Humphries (John Carney kick), 3:37. Chargers 21–0. **Drive: 9 plays, 79 yards, 4:42.**

**Third quarter**

- SDG – Leonard Russell 1-yard run (John Carney kick), 7:34. Chargers 28–0. **Drive: 10 plays, 74 yards, 5:15.**

**Fourth quarter**

- KAN – Chris Penn 17-yard pass from Rich Gannon (Pete Stoyanovich kick), 8:54. Chargers 28–7. **Drive: 8 plays, 68 yards, 2:58.**
- KAN – Todd McNair 10-yard pass from Rich Gannon (Pete Stoyanovich kick), 2:54. Chargers 28–14. **Drive: 11 plays, 80 yards, 2:50.**

**Top passers**

- SDG – Stan Humphries – 13/26, 252 yards, 2 TD
- KAN – Rich Gannon – 22/31, 226 yards, 2 TD

**Top rushers**

- SDG – Leonard Russell – 32 rushes, 88 yards, 2 TD
- KAN – Greg Hill – 6 rushes, 45 yards

**Top receivers**

- SDG – Tony Martin – 5 receptions, 148 yards, 2 TD
- KAN – Chris Penn – 6 receptions, 90 yards, TD

A surprising road win balanced out the home upset from a week earlier. Kansas City were 8-3 coming in, but San Diego completed the sweep with more ease than the final scoreline suggested. After Martin had opened the scoring, Kansas City reached a 3rd and 5 at the Charger 20, but Harrison intercepted Steve Bono, and San Diego drove 97 yards the other way to a Russell touchdown. Another TD reception by Martin made it 21–0 at halftime.

There was a repeat performance in the 3rd quarter; Harrison again intercepted Bono, and the Chargers again converted the turnover into a Russell score. Rich Gannon replaced Bono late in the 3rd quarter and led his team on a pair of touchdown drives, but they came too late to seriously threaten a comeback.

Martin caught five passes in the game: they covered 29, 20, 34, 10 and 55 yards respectively, the two shortest receptions being touchdowns. With a 7–5 record, San Diego were positioned as the 3rd wild card in the playoff race.

==== Week 14: vs. New England Patriots ====
Week Fourteen: New England Patriots at San Diego Chargers – Game summary

Quarter	1	2	3	4	Total
Patriots	14	17	14	0	**45**
Chargers	7	0	0	0	**7**

at Jack Murphy Stadium, San Diego, California

- Date: December 1
- Game time: 5:00 p.m. PST
- Game weather: 55 °F (12.8 °C), relative humidity 66%, wind 5 mph
- Game attendance: 59,209
- Referee: Ed Hochuli
- TV announcers (ESPN): Mike Patrick and Joe Theismann
- Box score

Game information

**First quarter**

- NE – Terry Glenn 8-yard pass from Drew Bledsoe (Adam Vinatieri kick), 11:13. Patriots 7–0. **Drive: 7 plays, 64 yards, 3:47.**
- NE – Keith Byars 19-yard pass from Drew Bledsoe (Adam Vinatieri kick), 5:28. Patriots 14–0. **Drive: 7 plays, 69 yards, 3:29.**
- SDG – Tony Martin 46-yard pass from Stan Humphries (John Carney kick), 2:58. Patriots 14–7. **Drive: 5 plays, 71 yards, 2:30.**

**Second quarter**

- NE – Sam Gash 7-yard pass from Drew Bledsoe (Adam Vinatieri kick), 13:20. Patriots 21–7. **Drive: 2 plays, 7 yards, 0:40.**
- NE – Willie McGinest defensive fumble recovery in end zone (Adam Vinatieri kick), 2:32. Patriots 28–7.
- NE – Adam Vinatieri 47-yard field goal, 7:17. Patriots 31–7. **Drive: 7 plays, 24 yards, 1:07.**

**Third quarter**

- NE – Shawn Jefferson 11-yard pass from Drew Bledsoe (Adam Vinatieri kick), 12:46. Patriots 38–7. **Drive: 3 plays, 27 yards, 1:26.**
- NE – Corwin Brown 42-yard fumble return (Adam Vinatieri kick), 1:23. Patriots 45–7.

**Fourth quarter**

- No scoring plays.

**Top passers**

- NE – Drew Bledsoe – 19/29, 232 yards, 4 TD
- SDG – Stan Humphries – 16/35, 204 yards, TD, 3 INT

**Top rushers**

- NE – Curtis Martin – 19 rushes, 63 yards
- SDG – Leonard Russell – 10 rushes, 35 yards

**Top receivers**

- NE – Ben Coates – 6 receptions, 71 yards
- SDG – Tony Martin – 5 receptions, 84 yards, TD

A home thrashing derailed the Chargers' playoff push. The Patriots scored touchdowns on their first two drives, before Stan Humphries found Tony Martin from 46 yards out to halve the deficit. Little went right for the Chargers thereafter, with six turnovers, including a pair of fumbles that were returned for touchdowns. Patriots' QB Drew Bledsoe threw four touchdowns, the last of these to former Charger Shawn Jefferson, and Humphries was knocked out of the game in the 3rd quarter with a concussion.

Tony Martin's score was the lone bright spot for San Diego. It was his 14th of the season, tying Lance Alworth's club record. However, Martin failed to score in the remaining three games, so the record remained unbroken. Taken together with their Week 3 loss in Green Bay, San Diego were outscored 87–17 by the eventual participants of Super Bowl XXXI.

==== Week 15: at Pittsburgh Steelers ====
Week Fifteen: San Diego Chargers at Pittsburgh Steelers – Game summary

Quarter	1	2	3	4	Total
Chargers	0	0	3	0	**3**
Steelers	6	7	0	3	**16**

at Three Rivers Stadium, Pittsburgh, Pennsylvania

- Date: December 8
- Game time: 1:00 p.m. EST
- Game weather: 34 °F (1.1 °C), relative humidity 73%, wind 12 mph, wind chill 25
- Game attendance: 56,368
- Referee: Gerald Austin
- TV announcers (NBC): Tom Hammond and Bob Trumpy
- Box score

Game information

**First quarter**

- PIT – Norm Johnson 49-yard field goal, 10:09. Steelers 3–0. **Drive: 5 plays, 53 yards, 2:09.**
- PIT – Norm Johnson 39-yard field goal, 3:29. Steelers 6–0. **Drive: 6 plays, 12 yards, 3:23.**

**Second quarter**

- PIT – Andre Hastings 11-yard pass from Mike Tomczak (Norm Johnson kick), 1:03. Steelers 13–0. **Drive: 10 plays, 88 yards, 4:12.**

**Third quarter**

- SDG – John Carney 25-yard field goal, 3:56. Steelers 13–3. **Drive: 7 plays, 20 yards, 2:25.**

**Fourth quarter**

- PIT – Norm Johnson 21-yard field goal, 14:12. Steelers 16–3. **Drive: 7 plays, 20 yards, 3:16.**

**Top passers**

- SDG – Sean Salisbury – 10/29, 125 yards, INT
- PIT – Mike Tomczak – 15/31, 153 yards, TD, 3 INT

**Top rushers**

- SDG – Leonard Russell – 16 rushes, 35 yards
- PIT – Erric Pegram – 17 rushes, 83 yards

**Top receivers**

- SDG – Andre Coleman – 1 reception, 50 yards
- PIT – Charles Johnson – 4 receptions, 67 yards

An anemic offensive performance saw the Chargers lose a scrappy game, in which both teams committed four turnovers. Two of these occurred on the same play: Darrien Gordon intercepted a tipped ball, but was hit by teammate Terrence Shaw and fumbled. The Steelers converted that error into a field goal, and led 13–0 at the break.

The Chargers offense, which once again had Salisbury in as starting QB, had mustered few threats to that point, but managed to get inside the Pittsburgh 10 before settling for a field goal. However, Salisbury fumbled while being sacked on the next possession, and the Steelers responded in kind. A 50-yard catch by Andre Coleman helped San Diego reach 3rd and 2 at the five yard line on their next possession, but Russell fumbled the chance away. A 55-yard interception return by Gordon set up one more chance, but Salisbury was sacked twice and the Chargers turned it over on downs.

==== Week 16: at Chicago Bears ====
Week Sixteen: San Diego Chargers at Chicago Bears – Game summary

Quarter	1	2	3	4	Total
Chargers	7	7	0	0	**14**
Bears	14	0	3	10	**27**

at Soldier Field, Chicago, Illinois

- Date: December 14
- Game time: 3:00 p.m. EST
- Game weather: 37 °F (2.8 °C), relative humidity 85%, wind 8 mph
- Game attendance: 49,763
- Referee: Dick Hantak
- TV announcers (NBC): Charlie Jones and Randy Cross
- Box score

Game information

**First quarter**

- SDG – Andre Coleman 20-yard pass from Stan Humphries (John Carney kick), 12:38. Chargers 7–0. **Drive: 5 plays, 75 yards, 2:22.**
- CHI – Bobby Engram 7-yard pass from Dave Krieg (Jeff Jaeger kick), 8:27. Tied 7–7. **Drive: 10 plays, 32 yards, 4:11.**
- CHI – Curtis Conway 7-yard pass from Dave Krieg (Jeff Jaeger kick), 1:37. Bears 14–7. **Drive: 9 plays, 50 yards, 5:02.**

**Second quarter**

- SDG – Leonard Russell 1-yard run (John Carney kick), 12:27. Tied 14–14. **Drive: 9 plays, 80 yards, 4:10.**

**Third quarter**

- CHI – Jeff Jaeger 45-yard field goal, 6:05. Bears 17–14. **Drive: 8 plays, 53 yards, 3:36.**

**Fourth quarter**

- CHI – Ryan Wetnight 8-yard pass from Dave Krieg (Jeff Jaeger kick), 14:53. Bears 24–14. **Drive: 13 plays, 51 yards, 5:06.**
- CHI – Jeff Jaeger 40-yard field goal, 1:04. Bears 27–14. **Drive: 11 plays, 58 yards, 5:03.**

**Top passers**

- SDG – Stan Humphries – 23/38, 217 yards, TD, INT
- CHI – Dave Krieg – 24/38, 217 yards, 3 TD

**Top rushers**

- SDG – Terrell Fletcher – 17 rushes, 37 yards
- CHI – Raymont Harris – 21 rushes, 64 yards

**Top receivers**

- SDG – Tony Martin – 9 receptions, 74 yards
- CHI – Bobby Engram – 5 receptions, 61 yards, TD

The Chargers suffered a third straight loss, and were soon eliminated from the playoff race. They started brightly, Humphries finding Russell for 35 yards on the game's opening play, and Coleman for a touchdown four plays later. After a pair of Bears touchdowns, Russell tied the scores from a yard out. On the next San Diego drive, Carney missed a 48-yard field goal, and the teams were still level at halftime. Carney also hit the upright from only 26 yards out in the second half, as the Bears pulled away.

Seau twice sacked Dave Krieg, bring his season tally to 7.0, which matched his career high. San Diego were officially eliminated from playoff contention the next day, when Indianapolis won at Kansas City.

==== Week 17: vs. Denver Broncos ====
Week Seventeen: Denver Broncos at San Diego Chargers – Game summary

Quarter	1	2	3	4	Total
Broncos	10	0	0	0	**10**
Chargers	7	3	6	0	**16**

at Jack Murphy Stadium, San Diego, California

- Date: December 22
- Game time: 5:00 p.m. PST
- Game weather: 59 °F (15.0 °C), relative humidity 81%, wind 13 mph
- Game attendance: 46,801
- Referee: Tom White
- TV announcers (ESPN): Mike Patrick and Joe Theismann
- Box score

Game information

**First quarter**

- DEN – Jason Elam 51-yard field goal, 13:49. Broncos 3–0. **Drive: 4 plays, -2 yards, 1:03.**
- DEN – Terrell Davis 1-yard run (Jason Elam kick), 8:20. Broncos 10–0. **Drive: 7 plays, 31 yards, 3:00.**
- SDG – Charlie Jones 9-yard pass from Stan Humphries (John Carney kick), 1:46. Broncos 10–7. **Drive: 3 plays, 15 yards, 1:21.**

**Second quarter**

- SDG – John Carney 50-yard field goal, 8:31. Tied 10–10. **Drive: 4 plays, 4 yards, 1:22.**

**Third quarter**

- SDG – John Carney 21-yard field goal, 9:24. Chargers 13–10. **Drive: 10 plays, 57 yards, 4:12.**
- SDG – John Carney 22-yard field goal, 0:33. Chargers 16–10. **Drive: 14 plays, 78 yards, 6:13.**

**Fourth quarter**

- No scoring plays.

**Top passers**

- DEN – Bill Musgrave – 11/18, 69 yards, INT
- SDG – Stan Humphries – 17/36, 170 yards, TD, 3 INT

**Top rushers**

- DEN – Jeff Lewis – 3 rushes, 35 yards
- SDG – Freddie Bradley – 19 rushes, 60 yards

**Top receivers**

- DEN – Aaron Craver – 6 receptions, 32 yards
- SDG – Tony Martin – 4 receptions, 50 yards

San Diego won a low-key final game to finish at 8-8. With Denver assured of the #1 seed, neither side had much to play for. John Elway started the game, and had his side up 10–0 before losing a fumble which Seau recovered, setting up a Humphries-to-Jones touchdown pass. After Elway was pulled, Seau recovered another fumble to set up the first of thee Carney field goals. With Terrell Davis soon joining his quarterback on the sidelines, the Denver offense was led by backups, and could generate no further points; Rodney Harrison foiled their best chance with an end zone interception.

The result meant that Bobby Ross left San Diego as the first Charger head coach to post no losing records during his tenure.

== Standings ==
AFC West
	W	L	T	PCT	PF	PA	STK
^{(1)} Denver Broncos	13	3	0	.813	391	275	L1
Kansas City Chiefs	9	7	0	.563	297	300	L3
San Diego Chargers	8	8	0	.500	310	376	W1
Oakland Raiders	7	9	0	.438	340	293	L2
Seattle Seahawks	7	9	0	.438	317	376	W1

== Awards ==
Seau and Martin were the only Chargers in the AFC Pro Bowl squad, both named as starters. Seau was also named a first-team All-Pro by the Associated Press, with Martin in the second team.
