= 1995 San Diego Chargers season =

NFL team 36th season

- Owner: Alex Spanos
- General manager: Bobby Beathard
- Head coach: Bobby Ross
- Offensive coordinator: Ralph Friedgen
- Defensive coordinator: Dave Adolph
- Home stadium: Jack Murphy Stadium

Results
- Record: 9–7
- Division place: 2nd AFC West
- Playoffs: Lost Wild Card Playoffs (vs. Colts) 20–35
- All-Pros: 2: P Darren Bennett (1st team); LB Junior Seau (2nd team)
- Pro Bowlers: 3: P Darren Bennett; DE Leslie O'Neal; LB Junior Seau

The 1995 San Diego Chargers season was the team's 36th, its 26th in the National Football League (NFL), and its 35th in San Diego.

The season began with the team as reigning AFC champions and trying to improve on their 11–5 record in 1994. After starting 4–7, the Chargers won their final five games to get into the playoffs. It ended in the first round with a loss to the Indianapolis Colts. That game would mark the last time the Chargers made the playoffs until the 2004 season, by when only long snapper David Binn remained from the 1995 roster.

While most of the offensive starters returned from the Super Bowl run were back, the Chargers slipped down the rankings for both passing and rushing. They were hampered by an injury to Natrone Means, who finished with 730 yards despite only having 5 carries in the second half of the season. Tony Martin established himself as the club's leading receiver, with 1,224 yards from 90 catches — this broke Kellen Winslow's club record for receptions in a season. The defense continued to be solid. Safeties Darren Carrington and Stanley Richard were both released after disappointing performances in the Super Bowl; Rodney Harrison began to see more action as a strong safety, and led the team with five interceptions. Leslie O'Neal, in his final year with the club, was once again the sack leader with 12.5; Junior Seau's 130 tackles were 45 more than the next best of his teammates. Andre Coleman continued to be dangerous, running one punt and two kickoffs back for touchdowns, though he also fumbled ten times. Former Australian rules full-forward Darren Bennett was voted to the Pro Bowl in his first season as a starting punter.

The Chargers suffered a tragedy during the offseason, when linebacker David Griggs was killed in a road accident.

After the season, Stan Brock, who had been with the San Diego Chargers since 1993, retired.

== Offseason ==
Additions	Subtractions
S Shaun Gayle (Bears)	RB Eric Bieniemy (Bengals)
	DT Les Miller (Saints)

=== 1995 expansion draft ===
San Diego Chargers selected during the expansion draft
Round	Overall	Name	Position	Expansion team
7	14	Curtis Whitley	Center	Carolina Panthers
14	27	Darren Carrington	Safety	Jacksonville Jaguars

=== NFL draft ===
1995 San Diego Chargers draft
Round	Pick	Player	Position	College	Notes
2	34	Terrance Shaw	Cornerback	Stephen F. Austin	
2	51	Terrell Fletcher	Running back	Wisconsin	
2	61	Jimmy Oliver	Wide receiver	TCU	
3	93	Don Sasa	Defensive tackle	Washington State	
3	98	Preston Harrison	Offensive guard	Ohio State	
3	100	Chris Cowart	Linebacker	Florida State	
4	104	Aaron Hayden	Running back	Tennessee	
5	162	'Omar Ellison	Wide receiver	Florida State	
6	177	Troy Sienkiewicz	Offensive guard	New Mexico State	
6	183	Brandon Harrison	Wide receiver	Howard Payne	
6	197	Craig Whelihan	Quarterback	Pacific	
6	200	Tony Berti	Offensive tackle	Colorado	
7	237	Mark Montreuil	Cornerback	Concordia (Quebec)	
Made roster * Made at least one Pro Bowl during career

== Personnel ==
=== Staff ===
1995 San Diego Chargers staff
Front office: chairman of the board – Alex Spanos; President and vice-chairman – Dean Spanos; general manager – Bobby Beathard; Assistant general manager – Dick Daniels; Director of player personnel – Billy Devaney; Director of pro personnel – Rudy Feldman; Coordinator of football operations – Marty Hurney; Head coaches: Head coach – Bobby Ross; Offensive coaches: Offensive coordinator – Ralph Friedgen; Quarterbacks – Dwain Painter; Offensive backs – Sylvester Croom; Wide receivers – Jerry Sullivan; Tight ends/h-backs – Frank Falks; Offensive line – Carl Mauck; Offense and special teams assistant – Stan Kwan; Quality control – John Misciagna	Defensive coaches: Defensive coordinator – Dave Adolph; Defensive line – Dennis Murphy; Linebackers – Dale Lindsey; Secondary – Greg Brown; Defense assistant – Kevin O'Dea; Special teams coaches: Special teams – Chuck Priefer; Strength and conditioning: Strength and conditioning – John Dunn; Strength and conditioning assistant – John Hastings

=== Roster ===
1995 San Diego Chargers roster
Quarterbacks (QB): 13 Gale Gilbert; 12 Stan Humphries; 5 Craig Whelihan; Running backs (RB): 22 Rodney Culver; 41 Terrell Fletcher; 33 Ronnie Harmon; 24 Aaron Hayden; 20 Natrone Means; Wide receivers (WR): 83 Andre Coleman; 84 'Omar Ellison; 80 Shawn Jefferson; 81 Tony Martin; 82 Mark Seay; Tight ends (TE): 88 Deems May; 89 Shannon Mitchell; 86 Alfred Pupunu; 87 Duane Young	Offensive linemen (OL): 61 Tony Berti T; 67 Stan Brock T; 68 Joe Cocozzo G; 73 Isaac Davis G; 60 Greg Engel C; 53 Courtney Hall C; 77 Eric Moten G; 70 Vaughn Parker T; 65 Troy Sienkiewicz G; 72 Harry Swayne T; Defensive linemen (DL): 90 Sebastian Barrie DE; 93 Reuben Davis DT; 99 Raylee Johnson DE; 98 Shawn Lee DT; 94 Chris Mims DE; 91 Leslie O'Neal DE; 97 John Parrella DT	Linebackers (LB): 51 David Brandon OLB; 58 Lewis Bush OLB; 57 Dennis Gibson MLB; 52 Dwayne Gordon MLB; 55 Junior Seau OLB; 59 Glen Young MLB; Defensive backs (DB): 44 Eric Castle FS; 31 Willie Clark CB; 23 Shaun Gayle SS; 21 Darrien Gordon CB; 28 Dwayne Harper CB; 37 Rodney Harrison SS; 38 David Hendrix SS; 40 Mark Montreuil CB; 26 Bo Orlando FS; 29 Terrance Shaw CB; Special teams (ST): 2 Darren Bennett P; 50 David Binn LS; 3 John Carney K	Practice squad: 46 Maurice Harrell TE; 16 Brandon Harrison WR; Reserve: 85 Jimmy Oliver WR (IR); 96 Don Sasa DT (IR); Rookies in italics 53 active, 2 reserve, 2 practice squad

== Preseason ==
Week	Date	Opponent	Result	Record	Venue	Attendance
1	August 7	Minnesota Vikings	L 19–23	0–1	Jack Murphy Stadium	
2	August 13	San Francisco 49ers	L 6–17	0–2	Jack Murphy Stadium	
3	August 19	vs. Houston Oilers	Canceled		Alamodome (San Antonio)	
4	August 25	St. Louis Rams	W 17–9	1–2	Jack Murphy Stadium	

== Regular season ==
=== Schedule ===
Week	Date	Opponent	Result	Record	Venue	Attendance
1	September 3	at **Oakland Raiders**	**L** 7–17	0–1	Oakland–Alameda County Coliseum	50,323
2	September 10	**Seattle Seahawks**	**W** 14–10	1–1	Jack Murphy Stadium	54,420
3	September 17	at Philadelphia Eagles	**W** 27–21	2–1	Veterans Stadium	63,081
4	September 24	**Denver Broncos**	**W** 17–6	3–1	Jack Murphy Stadium	58,987
5	October 1	at Pittsburgh Steelers	**L** 16–31	3–2	Three Rivers Stadium	57,012
6	October 9	at **Kansas City Chiefs**	**L** 23–29 (OT)	3–3	Arrowhead Stadium	79,288
7	October 15	Dallas Cowboys	**L** 9–23	3–4	Jack Murphy Stadium	62,664
8	October 22	at **Seattle Seahawks**	**W** 35–25	4–4	Kingdome	45,821
9	Bye					
10	November 5	Miami Dolphins	**L** 14–24	4–5	Jack Murphy Stadium	61,996
11	November 12	**Kansas City Chiefs**	**L** 7–22	4–6	Jack Murphy Stadium	59,285
12	November 19	at **Denver Broncos**	**L** 27–30	4–7	Mile High Stadium	74,681
13	November 27	**Oakland Raiders**	**W** 12–6	5–7	Jack Murphy Stadium	60,607
14	December 3	Cleveland Browns	**W** 31–13	6–7	Jack Murphy Stadium	56,358
15	December 9	Arizona Cardinals	**W** 28–25	7–7	Jack Murphy Stadium	55,258
16	December 17	at Indianapolis Colts	**W** 27–24	8–7	RCA Dome	55,318
17	December 23	at New York Giants	**W** 27–17	9–7	Giants Stadium	50,243
Note: Intra-division opponents are in **bold** text.

=== Game summaries ===
==== Week 1: at Oakland Raiders ====
Week One: San Diego Chargers at Oakland Raiders – Game summary

Quarter	1	2	3	4	Total
Chargers	0	7	0	0	**7**
Raiders	0	7	10	0	**17**

at Oakland-Alameda County Coliseum, Oakland, California

- Date: September 3
- Game time: 1:00 p.m. PDT
- Game weather: 63 °F (17.2 °C), relative humidity 83%, wind 11 mph
- Game attendance: 50,323
- Referee: Dick Hantak
- TV announcers (NBC): Dan Hicks and Randy Cross
- Box score

Game information

**First quarter**

- No scoring plays.

**Second quarter**

- OAK – Tim Brown 5-yard pass from Jeff Hostetler (Cole Ford kick), 11:57. Raiders 7–0. **Drive: 14 plays, 99 yards, 8:20.**
- SDG – Shawn Jefferson 39-yard pass from Stan Humphries (John Carney kick), 1:17. Tied 7–7. **Drive: 7 plays, 62 yards, 3:24.**

**Third quarter**

- OAK – Cole Ford 46-yard field goal, 13:43. Raiders 10–7. **Drive: 4 plays, 4 yards, 0:59.**
- OAK – Napoleon Kaufman 16-yard run (Cole Ford kick), 3:44. Raiders 17–7. **Drive: 2 plays, 27 yards, 0:41.**

**Fourth quarter**

- No scoring plays.

**Top passers**

- SDG – Stan Humphries – 23/47, 305 yards, TD, INT
- OAK – Jeff Hostetler – 14/26, 136 yards, TD

**Top rushers**

- SDG – Natrone Means – 15 rushes, 60 yards
- OAK – Harvey Williams – 16 rushes, 48 yards

**Top receivers**

- SDG – Shawn Jefferson – 6 receptions, 120 yards, TD
- OAK – Daryl Hobbs – 2 receptions, 27 yards

San Diego had a 3rd and 13 at the Oakland 38 in the opening quarter, but Humphries' long pass was intercepted at the 1-yard line. The Raiders responded with a 14-play, 99-yard drive that featured 10 runs for 58 yards. Means had a 35-yard carry on the ensuing drive, which ended with Carney's 42-yard field goal miss. San Diego faced a 2nd and 20 on their next drive, but Humphries found Martin for 19 yards and Means converted the third down with a 2-yard run. On the next play, Humphries threw to Jefferson at the goal line for a touchdown. The score was 7–7 at halftime.

Means lost a fumble at his own 33-yard line on the first play of the second half; the Chargers' defense allowed only four yards, and Oakland kicked a field goal. The teams then punted twice each, but Coleman fumbled the last of these at his own 27 and Oakland recovered, setting up a touchdown two plays later. The Chargers reached a 4th and 2 at the Raiders 32 in response, but Humphries threw incomplete on the first play of the 4th quarter. San Diego turned the ball over on downs twice more during the final period.

Jefferson's 120 receiving yards were the most he had during five season in San Diego. The Chargers outgained Oakland by 371 yards to 247, but committed all three of the game's turnovers.

==== Week 2: vs. Seattle Seahawks ====
Week Two: Seattle Seahawks at San Diego Chargers – Game summary

Quarter	1	2	3	4	Total
Seahawks	0	7	3	0	**10**
Chargers	7	0	0	7	**14**

at Jack Murphy Stadium, San Diego, California

- Date: September 10
- Game time: 1:00 p.m. PDT
- Game weather: 70 °F (21.1 °C), relative humidity 75%, wind 10 mph
- Game attendance: 54,420
- Referee: Walt Coleman
- TV announcers (NBC): Jim Lampley and Bob Golic
- Box score

Game information

**First quarter**

- SDG – Tony Martin 5-yard pass from Stan Humphries (John Carney kick), 8:37. Chargers 7–0. **Drive: 12 plays, 75 yards, 6:23.**

**Second quarter**

- SEA – Christian Fauria 20-yard pass from Rick Mirer (Todd Peterson kick), 10:31. Tied 7–7. **Drive: 8 plays, 47 yards, 3:42.**

**Third quarter**

- SEA – Todd Peterson 23-yard field goal, 10:29. Seahawks 10–7. **Drive: 11 plays, 57 yards, 4:31.**

**Fourth quarter**

- SDG – Ronnie Harmon 15-yard pass from Stan Humphries (John Carney kick), 13:41. Chargers 14–10. **Drive: 11 plays, 80 yards, 6:07.**

**Top passers**

- SEA – Rick Mirer – 13/29, 127 yards, TD, 2 INT
- SDG – Stan Humphries – 23/35, 260 yards, 2 TD, INT

**Top rushers**

- SEA – Chris Warren – 16 rushes, 56 yards
- SDG – Natrone Means – 26 rushes, 115 yards

**Top receivers**

- SEA – Christian Fauria – 4 receptions, 41 yards, TD
- SDG – Tony Martin – 13 receptions, 163 yards, TD

San Diego took the opening kickoff and drove 75 yards without having to convert a third down, with Martin's touchdown catch putting them ahead. They later moved from their own 9-yard line to the Seattle 40, but Humphries was intercepted and the Seahawks drove 47 yards the other way for the game-tying score. Seattle threatened to take the lead on their next possession, but Harrison intercepted Rick Mirer on a 3rd and 8 from the San Diego 13-yard line. The score remained 7–7 at halftime.

On the opening possession of the second half, Seattle reached a 3rd and goal from the San Diego 9. Mirer attempted to run the ball in, but was stopped a yard short by Bo Orlando and Glen Young. Following an exchange of punts, Humphries completed all five of his passes and accounted for 52 out of 80 yards on the go-ahead drive, capped by Harmon's touchdown catch with 13:41 to play. The Chargers missed a chance to extend their lead when Martin fumbled after a 24-yard catch to the Seattle 19-yard line. Three plays later, Harrison intercepted Mirer's long pass attempt at the San Diego 15. The Chargers then ran off the last 4:35 of the game, together with three Seahawks timeouts, with Means and Martin picking up two first downs each.

Harrison had the first two interceptions of his career. The Chargesr again comfortably outgained their opponents, this time by 397 yards to 209.

==== Week 3: at Philadelphia Eagles ====
Week Three: San Diego Chargers at Philadelphia Eagles – Game summary

Quarter	1	2	3	4	Total
Chargers	0	17	10	0	**27**
Eagles	7	7	7	0	**21**

at Veterans Stadium, Philadelphia, Pennsylvania

- Date: September 17
- Game time: 1:00 p.m. EDT
- Game weather: 65 °F (18.3 °C), relative humidity 92%, wind 13 mph
- Game attendance: 63,081
- Referee: Gordon McCarter
- TV announcers (NBC): Charlie Jones and Randy Cross
- Box score

Game information

**First quarter**

- PHI – Ricky Watters 4-yard pass from Randall Cunningham (Gary Anderson kick), 6:10. Eagles 7–0. **Drive: 10 plays, 45 yards, 4:46.**

**Second quarter**

- PHI – Fred Barnett 1-yard pass from Randall Cunningham (Gary Anderson kick), 14:56. Eagles 14–0. **Drive: 5 plays, 36 yards, 2:26.**
- SDG – Shawn Jefferson 38-yard pass from Stan Humphries (John Carney kick), 13:10. Eagles 14–7. **Drive: 4 plays, 49 yards, 1:46.**
- SDG – John Carney 35-yard field goal, 1:29. Eagles 14–10. **Drive: 8 plays, 42 yards, 3:12.**
- SDG – Junior Seau 29-yard defensive fumble return (John Carney kick), 1:16. Chargers 17–14.

**Third quarter**

- SDG – Andre Coleman 88-yard punt return (John Carney kick), 13:18. Chargers 24–14.
- SDG – John Carney 21-yard field goal, 5:35. Chargers 27–14. **Drive: 12 plays, 55 yards, 5:54.**
- PHI – Ed West 3-yard pass from Randall Cunningham (Gary Anderson kick), 1:30. Chargers 27–21. **Drive: 8 plays, 80 yards, 4:05.**

**Fourth quarter**

- No scoring plays.

**Top passers**

- SDG – Stan Humphries – 10/23, 143 yards, TD
- PHI – Randall Cunningham – 23/39, 196 yards, 3 TD, INT

**Top rushers**

- SDG – Natrone Means – 23 rushes, 122 yards
- PHI – Ricky Watters – 19 rushes, 76 yards

**Top receivers**

- SDG – Shawn Jefferson – 4 receptions, 67 yards, TD
- PHI – Calvin Williams – 3 receptions, 49 yards

San Diego went three-and-out on each of their first three possessions and already trailed by a touchdown before Means lost a fumble on the first play of their fourth possession. Randall Cunningham threw his second touchdown five plays later, and the Eagles led 14–0. Coleman returned the ensuing kickoff 41 yards to the Philadelphia 49-yard line; Harmon ran for 5 yards on a 3rd and 4, and Humphries found Jefferson for a touchdown on the next play. Shortly before halftime, Martin's 41-yard catch took the Chargers inside the Eagles 10-yard line. Humphries fumbled when sacked on 3rd down, but center Courtney Hall recovered and John Carney kicked a field goal to further narrow the gap. On the first play of the following drive, Calvin Williams fumbled and Junior Seau returned the loose ball 29 yards up the sideline before diving over a tackle for a touchdown and a 17–14 halftime lead.

Philadelphia went three-and-out to start the second half, and Coleman returned a punt 88 yards down the right sideline for another score; he ran his next return back 20 yards to the San Diego 42, eventually leading to a short Carney field goal and a run of twenty-seven unanswered points. Cunningham responded with his 3rd touchdown pass with over a quarter still to play, but the Chargers' defense didn't let the Eagles cross midfield on their final four possessions; a Harrison interception in the final seconds clinched the win.

Coleman returned three kickoffs for 75 yards and four punts for 133 yards and a touchdown. Seau's touchdown was the only one of his 20-year career.

==== Week 4: vs. Denver Broncos ====
Week Four: Denver Broncos at San Diego Chargers – Game summary

Quarter	1	2	3	4	Total
Broncos	0	3	3	0	**6**
Chargers	0	7	0	10	**17**

at Jack Murphy Stadium, San Diego, California

- Date: September 24
- Game time: 1:00 p.m. PDT
- Game weather: 70 °F (21.1 °C), relative humidity 78%, wind 7 mph
- Game attendance: 58,978
- Referee: Bob McElwee
- TV announcers (NBC): Charlie Jones and Randy Cross
- Box score

Game information

**First quarter**

- No scoring plays.

**Second quarter**

- DEN – Jason Elam 23-yard field goal, 9:42. Broncos 3–0. **Drive: 13 plays, 84 yards, 6:51.**
- SDG – Natrone Means 3-yard run (John Carney kick), 2:42. Chargers 7–3. **Drive: 14 plays, 73 yards, 7:00.**

**Third quarter**

- DEN – Jason Elam 52-yard field goal, 11:19. Chargers 7–6. **Drive: 6 plays, 42 yards, 3:41.**

**Fourth quarter**

- SDG – Natrone Means 2-yard run (John Carney kick), 13:46. Chargers 14–6. **Drive: 16 plays, 86 yards, 6:49.**
- SDG – John Carney 45-yard field goal, 5:00. Chargers 17–6. **Drive: 11 plays, 27 yards, 5:46.**

**Top passers**

- DEN – John Elway – 19/34, 186 yards
- SDG – Stan Humphries – 18/32, 189 yards, INT

**Top rushers**

- DEN – Terrell Davis – 7 rushes, 27 yards
- SDG – Natrone Means – 27 rushes, 115 yards, 2 TD

**Top receivers**

- DEN – Terrell Davis – 4 receptions, 36 yards
- SDG – Tony Martin – 5 receptions, 82 yards

Means began the Chargers' second possession with a 26-yard run and Humphries kept it going when he converted a 4th and 1 at the Denver 21 with a quarterback sneak; three plays later, Humphries was intercepted to end the threat. Denver drove 84 yards the other way, settling for a field goal after Harrison tackled Ed McCaffrey a yard short on a 3rd and 4 from the San Diego 8-yard line. The Chargers converted four shorts 3rd downs on the ensuing possession; Means accounted for three of these, including a touchdown on 3rd and goal from the Denver 2. There was no more scoring in the half, which ended with San Diego 7–3 ahead.

Terrance Shaw was flagged for a 34-yard pass interference penalty on the first play of the second half, leading to another Denver field goal. After two punts each, the Chargers had another touchdown drive sustained by four 3rd down conversions; the first three of these were on Humphries passes, then Means again scored on 3rd and goal from the Denver 2-yard line. Martin had a 26-yard catch on 2nd and 16 early in the next Chargers drive, leading to Carney's 45-yard field goal. John Elway led the Broncos to the San Diego 31, but threw four consecutive incompletions to end the final series Denver threat.

Means gained over 100 yards for the third consecutive game, all wins. The Broncos converted 3rd down opportunities only 3 times from 13 attempts, while the Chargers converted 11 of 19.

==== Week 5: at Pittsburgh Steelers ====
Week Five: San Diego Chargers at Pittsburgh Steelers – Game summary

Quarter	1	2	3	4	Total
Chargers	0	6	7	3	**16**
Steelers	21	10	0	0	**31**

at Three Rivers Stadium, Pittsburgh, Pennsylvania

- Date: October 1
- Game time: 4:00 p.m. EDT
- Game weather: 64 °F (17.8 °C), relative humidity 70%, wind 11 mph
- Game attendance: 57,012
- Referee: Gerald Austin
- TV announcers (NBC): Dick Enberg, Paul Maguire and Phil Simms
- Box score

Game information

**First quarter**

- PIT – Bam Morris 1-yard run (Norm Johnson kick), 8:57. Steelers 7–0. **Drive: 11 plays, 75 yards, 6:03.**
- PIT – Willie Williams 63-yard interception return (Norm Johnson kick), 6:10. Steelers 14–0.
- PIT – Alvoid Mays 32-yard interception return (Norm Johnson kick), 1:33. Steelers 21–0.

**Second quarter**

- PIT – Norm Johnson 25-yard field goal, 9:34. Steelers 24–0. **Drive: 10 plays, 75 yards, 5:17.**
- SDG – Natrone Means 13-yard run (pass failed), 4:33. Steelers 24–6. **Drive: 6 plays, 50 yards, 2:41.**
- PIT – Bam Morris 2-yard run (Norm Johnson kick), 0:48. Steelers 31–6. **Drive: 10 plays, 82 yards, 3:45.**

**Third quarter**

- SDG – Tony Martin 19-yard pass from Stan Humphries (John Carney kick), 9:58. Steelers 31–13. **Drive: 10 plays, 77 yards, 5:02.**

**Fourth quarter**

- SDG – John Carney 28-yard field goal, 14:51. Steelers 31–16. **Drive: 10 plays, 70 yards, 4:39.**

**Top passers**

- SDG – Stan Humphries – 22/40, 257 yards, TD, 4 INT
- PIT – Mike Tomczak – 12/21, 147 yards, INT

**Top rushers**

- SDG – Natrone Means – 18 rushes, 92 yards, TD
- PIT – Erric Pegram – 23 rushes, 95 yards

**Top receivers**

- SDG – Shawn Jefferson – 5 receptions, 81 yards
- PIT – Yancey Thigpen – 3 receptions, 58 yards

Pittsburgh opened the game with a six-minute touchdown drive. San Diego reached a 2nd and 7 from the Steelers 43 in response, but a Humphries pass was deflected, intercepted by Willie Williams and run back 63 yards for a touchdown. After an exchange of punts, another deflected pass was run back 32 yards by Alvoid Mays for a score; a field goal extended their lead to twenty-four points. Lewis Bush intercepted a Mike Tomczak pass at midfield, starting a drive that Means capped with a 13-yard touchdown run, but Pittsburgh came straight back with an 82-yard touchdown drive and led 31–6 at halftime.

Humphries threw a touchdown on the Chargers' first possession of the second half, and was intercepted again on their second. He completed four consecutive passes for 70 yards late in the 3rd quarter, but was sacked on 2nd and goal from the 3-yard line and the Chargers settled for a field goal. San Diego had a chance to get closer midway through the final quarter, but Martin dropped a potential 47-yard touchdown and Humphries threw his fourth interception three plays later.

This was a rematch of the previous season's AFC championship game, won by San Diego in the same venue. Humphries threw four interceptions in a regular season game for the first time.

==== Week 6: at Kansas City Chiefs ====
Week Six: San Diego Chargers at Kansas City Chiefs – Game summary

Quarter	1	2	3	4	OT	Total
Chargers	3	10	0	10	0	**23**
Chiefs	0	13	0	10	6	**29**

at Arrowhead Stadium, Kansas City, Missouri

- Date: October 9
- Game time: 8:00 p.m. CDT
- Game weather: 60 °F (15.6 °C), relative humidity 64%, wind 7 mph
- Game attendance: 79,288
- Referee: Howard Roe
- TV announcers (ABC): Al Michaels, Frank Gifford and Dan Dierdorf
- Box score

Game information

**First quarter**

- SDG – John Carney 20-yard field goal, 5:49. Chargers 3–0. **Drive: 19 plays, 63 yards, 9:11.**

**Second quarter**

- KAN – Lin Elliott 20-yard field goal, 13:24. Tied 3–3. **Drive: 14 plays, 67 yards, 7:25.**
- SDG – Natrone Means 2-yard run (John Carney kick), 11:24. Chargers 10–3. **Drive: 4 plays, 37 yards, 2:00.**
- KAN – Lin Elliott 28-yard field goal, 5:23. Chargers 10–6. **Drive: 13 plays, 63 yards, 6:01.**
- KAN – Kimble Anders 1-yard pass from Steve Bono (Lin Elliott kick), 3:53. Chiefs 13–10. **Drive: 3 plays, 22 yards, 1:30.**
- SDG – John Carney 36-yard field goal, 0:02. Tied 13-13. **Drive: 8 plays, 52 yards, 0:41.**

**Third quarter**

- No scoring plays

**Fourth quarter**

- KAN – Lin Elliott 20-yard field goal, 12:19. Chiefs 16–13. **Drive: 11 plays, 54 yards, 4:51.**
- SDG – Shannon Mitchell 4-yard pass from Stan Humphries (John Carney kick), 6:50. Chargers 20–16. **Drive: 10 plays, 73 yards, 5:29.**
- SDG – John Carney 29-yard field goal, 14:51. Chargers 23–16. **Drive: 9 plays, 60 yards, 3:26.**
- KAN – Derrick Walker 18-yard pass from Steve Bono (Lin Elliott kick), 0:15. Tied 23–23. **Drive: 8 plays, 79 yards, 0:57.**

**Overtime**

- KAN – Tamarick Vanover 86-yard punt return, 7:33. Chiefs 29–23.

**Top passers**

- SDG – Stan Humphries – 24/34, 315 yards, TD
- KAN – Steve Bono – 27/41, 329 yards, 2 TD

**Top rushers**

- SDG – Natrone Means – 24 rushes, 33 yards, TD
- KAN – Marcus Allen – 14 rushes, 26 yards

**Top receivers**

- SDG – Tony Martin – 7 receptions, 88 yards
- KAN – Webster Slaughter– 3 receptions, 90 yards

The first quarter saw only one possession each. San Diego opened with a 19-play drive on which Humphries completions converted four 3rd downs; they reached 2nd and goal from the 1 but were pushed when Vaughn Parker was flagged for a false start and Carney made a short field goal. The Chiefs' response took 14 plays and ended with another field goal. A 54-yard kickoff return by Coleman then set up the Chargers for a short touchdown drive capped by Means' 2-yard run. After a Chiefs field goal, Coleman fumbled the ensuing kickoff and Kansas City recovered to set up a 3-play touchdown drive and a three-point lead. The Chiefs were in position to add to that advantage shortly before halftime, but on 1st and 10 from the Chargers 18-yard line Steve Bono was sacked by Raylee Johnson and fumbled. Shawn Lee recovered the loose ball with 43 seconds remaining in the half, and Humphries managed to drive the Chargers into range for Carney to tie the score at 13–13 going into halftime.

Tony Martin fumbled away the best scoring chance of the 3rd quarter after catching a 30-yard pass to the Chiefs 11; the next score was a Lin Elliott field goal 13 minutes from time. On the next drive, Humphries ran for 11 yards on 3rd and 9 and converted a 3rd and 1 with a quarterback sneak. He then hit Shawn Jefferson for 45 yards down to the Chiefs 4-yard line and threw the go-ahead touchdown on the following play. After Junior Seau and Dennis Gibson stopped Marcus Allen in mid-flight for no gain on 3rd and 1, Kansas City punted. A 44-yard connection from Humphries to Ronnie Harmon converted a 3rd and 11 and took San Diego into Chiefs territory, but Humphries fell awkwardly on his throwing arm while completing another pass and had to leave the game with a shoulder injury. The Chargers ran the clock down to 1:12 before extending their lead with a field goal, but Bono led a rapid 79-yard drive and found Derrick Walker to tie the game at 23–23 with 15 seconds remaining.

San Diego won the toss in overtime. Gale Gilbert led the team to the edge of field goal range but was sacked by Neil Smith, forcing a punt. The Chiefs also had to kick the ball away, but not until after Lewis Bush had dropped a potential interception at the 22-yard line. Another Smith sack forced the Chargers to go three-and-out; Tamarick Vanover fielded the ensuing punt at his own 14, cut back to the left sideline, broke Bennett's tackle and completed the game-winning return.

It was the first NFL game to be decided by an overtime punt return touchdown, and also the fifth overtime game in the NFL that week, a setting a new record.

==== Week 7: vs. Dallas Cowboys ====
Week Seven: Dallas Cowboys at San Diego Chargers – Game summary

Quarter	1	2	3	4	Total
Cowboys	7	7	6	3	**23**
Chargers	2	0	7	0	**9**

at Jack Murphy Stadium, San Diego, California

- Date: October 15
- Game time: 1:00 p.m. PDT
- Game weather: 67 °F (19.4 °C), relative humidity 83%, wind 9 mph
- Game attendance: 62,664
- Referee: Dick Hantak
- TV announcers (FOX): Pat Summerall and John Madden
- Box score

Game information

**First quarter**

- SDG – Safety, Reuben Davis sacked Troy Aikman in end zone, 10:52. Chargers 2–0.
- DAL – Emmitt Smith 4-yard run (Chris Boniol kick), 4:30. Cowboys 7–2. **Drive: 5 plays, 48 yards, 2:29.**

**Second quarter**

- DAL – Emmitt Smith 1-yard run (Chris Boniol kick), 3:58. Cowboys 14–2. **Drive: 12 plays, 85 yards, 6:50.**

**Third quarter**

- SDG – Ronnie Harmon 48-yard run (John Carney kick), 11:40. Cowboys 14–9. **Drive: 4 plays, 67 yards, 2:13.**
- DAL – Daryl Johnston 1-yard run (kick failed), 3:40. Cowboys 20–9. **Drive: 14 plays, 80 yards, 8:00.**

**Fourth quarter**

- DAL – Chris Boniol 30-yard field goal, 5:27. Cowboys 23–9. **Drive: 8 plays, 57 yards, 5:01.**

**Top passers**

- DAL – Troy Aikman – 21/30, 222 yards
- SDG – Gale Gilbert – 20/32, 206 yards, 3 INT

**Top rushers**

- DAL – Emmitt Smith – 22 rushes, 68 yards, 2 TD
- SDG – Natrone Means – 22 rushes, 90 yards

**Top receivers**

- DAL – Michael Irvin – 7 receptions, 103 yards
- SDG – Andre Coleman – 3 receptions, 67 yards

Humphries was out with the shoulder injury he had picked up the previous week, so Gilbert started. He led the Chargers to a first down at the Dallas 34-yard line on the game's opening possession, then threw an interception on the next play after a miscommunication with Jefferson. Dallas took over at their own 7-yard line, but Reuben Davis immediately sacked Troy Aikman in the end zone for a safety. Gilbert was sacked near midfield on the next possession and lost a fumble, setting up a quick touchdown drive for the Cowboys. San Diego were soon threatening again; Gilbert's 41-yard completion to Coleman on 3rd and 26 was the biggest play as they moved from their own 16-yard line to a 2nd and goal from the Dallas 5. Gilbert then threw a wayward pass that was intercepted in the end zone. The Cowboys went three-and-out and San Diego took over near midfield, but Gilbert immediately threw another interception. It was the Chargers' fourth turnover in their first four possessions, and Dallas drove 85 yards to convert it into a touchdown and a 14–2 halftime lead.

Harmon broke away for a 48-yard touchdown early in the second half to cut the deficit to five points. Dallas took eight minutes off the clock on a 14-play, 80-yard touchdown drive. After an exchange of punts, the Chargers reached a 3rd and 12 on the Dallas 37. Gilbert hit Jefferson for an apparent touchdown, but Jefferson had stepped out of bounds before making the catch. San Diego tried to convert on 4th and 12, but could only gain 6 yards and turned the ball over. Dallas added a field goal and the Chargers failed to cross midfield on their final three possessions.

As well as the four turnovers, Gilbert was sacked six times and San Diego committed 9 penalties for 87 yards. The 48-yard run was the longest of Harmon's career.

==== Week 8: at Seattle Seahawks ====
Week Eight: San Diego Chargers at Seattle Seahawks – Game summary

Quarter	1	2	3	4	Total
Chargers	6	19	0	10	**35**
Seahawks	7	3	6	9	**25**

at Kingdome, Seattle, Washington

- Date: October 22
- Game time: 1:00 p.m. PDT
- Game weather: Dome
- Game attendance: 45,821
- Referee: Jerry Markbreit
- TV announcers (NBC): Jim Lampley and Bob Golic
- Box score

Game information

**First quarter**

- SEA – Brian Blades 41-yard pass from Rick Mirer (Todd Peterson kick), 7:04. Seahawks 7–0. **Drive: 6 plays, 59 yards, 2:15.**
- SDG – Ronnie Harmon 12-yard pass from Stan Humphries (kick blocked), 3:13. Seahawks 7–6. **Drive: 9 plays, 80 yards, 3:51.**

**Second quarter**

- SDG – Mark Seay 2-yard pass from Stan Humphries (pass failed), 11:42. Chargers 12–7. **Drive: 9 plays, 64 yards, 4:38.**
- SDG – Shaun Gayle defensive fumble recovery in end zone (pass failed), 8:32. Chargers 18–7.
- SEA – Todd Peterson 48-yard field goal, 4:44. Chargers 18–10. **Drive: 7 plays, 46 yards, 3:48.**
- SDG – Natrone Means 7-yard run (John Carney kick), 1:54. Chargers 25–10. **Drive: 7 plays, 75 yards, 2:50.**

**Third quarter**

- SEA – Chris Warren 1-yard run (pass failed), 9:25. Chargers 25–16. **Drive: 9 plays, 76 yards, 5:35.**

**Fourth quarter**

- SDG – Ronnie Harmon 23-yard pass from Stan Humphries (Carney kick), 14:24. Chargers 32–16. **Drive: 5 plays, 26 yards, 2:04.**
- SEA – Todd Peterson 27-yard field goal, 10:30. Chargers 32–19. **Drive: 9 plays, 41 yards, 3:54.**
- SDG – John Carney 25-yard field goal, 5:09. Chargers 35–19. **Drive: 4 plays, 4 yards, 2:12.**
- SEA – Chris Warren 6-yard run (run failed), 2:53. Chargers 35–25. **Drive: 6 plays, 67 yards, 2:16.**

**Top passers**

- SDG – Stan Humphries – 14/26, 166 yards, 3 TD, INT
- SEA – Rick Mirer – 17/26, 216 yards, TD, 3 INT

**Top rushers**

- SDG – Natrone Means – 26 rushes, 91 yards, TD
- SEA – Chris Warren – 8 rushes, 112 yards, 2 TD

**Top receivers**

- SDG – Ronnie Harmon – 3 receptions, 40 yards, 2 TD
- SEA – Chris Warren – 4 receptions, 45 yards

Gayle made an early interception of Mirer. Humphries had returned to the starting line-up, but was intercepted in turn on the next drive, and Seattle drove 59 yards for the opening touchdown. San Diego faced 4th and 2 from their own 41-yard line on the next series, Fletcher took a direct snap on a fake punt for 46 yards; Humphries found Harmon for a touchdown three plays later. On the next Chargers drive he converted a 4th and 1 with a quarterback sneak, followed up with a 37-yard completion to Martin, and hit Mark Seay for a 2-yard touchdown on 3rd and goal. Shortly afterwards, a 37-yard Bennett punt pinned the Seahawks at their own 1-yard line. Gayle recovered a fumbled snap in the end zone two plays later. After a Seahawks field goal, Means broke off a 36-yard run, then went the final 7 yards to the end zone on the next play; it was 25–10 at the break.

Seattle drove for a touchdown on the first possession of the second half. Late in the 3rd quarter, Harper intercepted Mirer and lateraled to Orlando, who ran the ball back 37 yards to the Seattle 26-yard line. Humphries and Harmon connected for a 23-yard touchdown on 3rd and 18 shortly afterwards. Shaw added a further interception as Seattle were kept at bay in the latter stages.

Leslie O'Neal had four of the Chargers' seven sacks; he had achieved only 2 1/2 sacks through the previous seven weeks. San Diego converted all three of their 4th down attempts.

==== Week 10: vs. Miami Dolphins ====
Week Ten: Miami Dolphins at San Diego Chargers – Game summary

Quarter	1	2	3	4	Total
Dolphins	7	0	7	10	**24**
Chargers	3	0	11	0	**14**

at Jack Murphy Stadium, San Diego, California

- Date: November 5
- Game time: 5:00 p.m. PST
- Game weather: 61 °F (16.1 °C), relative humidity 88%, wind 7 mph
- Game attendance: 61,996
- Referee: Bernie Kukar
- TV announcers (ESPN): Mike Patrick and Joe Theismann
- Box score

Game information

**First quarter**

- SDG – John Carney 33-yard field goal, 9:37. Chargers 3–0. **Drive: 10 plays, 31 yards, 5:23.**
- MIA – Irving Fryar 23-yard pass from Dan Marino (Pete Stoyanovich kick), 4:25. Dolphins 7–3. **Drive: 9 plays, 70 yards, 5:12.**

**Second quarter**

- No scoring plays.

**Third quarter**

- SDG – John Carney 39-yard field goal, 6:20. Dolphins 7–6. **Drive: 14 plays, 61 yards, 6:10.**
- MIA – Terry Kirby 5-yard pass from Dan Marino (Pete Stoyanovich kick), 4:19. Dolphins 14–6. **Drive: 7 plays, 66 yards, 2:01.**
- SDG – Tony Martin 50-yard pass from Stan Humphries (Mark Seay pass from Stan Humphries), 1:51. Tied 14–14. **Drive: 5 plays, 76 yards, 2:28.**

**Fourth quarter**

- MIA – Pete Stoyanovich 36-yard field goal, 10:40. Dolphins 17–14. **Drive: 15 plays, 62 yards, 6:47.**
- MIA – Keith Byars 1-yard run (Pete Stoyanovich kick), 7:22. Dolphins 24–14. **Drive: 3 plays, 18 yards, 1:21.**

**Top passers**

- MIA – Dan Marino – 25/39, 291 yards, 2 TD, INT
- SDG – Stan Humphries – 19/28, 206 yards, TD, INT

**Top rushers**

- MIA – Bernie Parmalee – 19 rushes, 103 yards
- SDG – Ronnie Harmon – 14 rushes, 52 yards

**Top receivers**

- MIA – Randal Hill – 2 receptions, 59 yards
- SDG – Tony Martin – 7 receptions, 121 yards, TD

Means was forced out of the game with a groin strain while making a 5-yard catch on the game's opening drive, which ended with a Carney field goal. The Dolphins responded by converting a 4th and 1 en route to Dan Marino's first touchdown pass. Humphries fumbled while being sacked soon afterwards, but Eric Moten recovered the ball at his own 16-yard line. After the Chargers punted, Miami reached a 3rd and goal from the 9, but Seau intercepted Marino near the goal line. Both sides crossed midfield on their next possession, but ended up punting; the score remained 7–3 at halftime.

San Diego went for it on 4th and 1 from the Miami 40-yard line midway through the 3rd quarter. Fletcher was tackled in the vicinity of the first down marker, but drew a face mask penalty to ensure the Chargers converted. Carney kicked his second field goal soon afterwards. Marino's 50-yard completion moved Miami to San Diego's 5-yard line, from where he found Terry Kirby for a touchdown on 3rd and goal. Humphries and Martin combined for 24 yards two plays into the Chargers' response, then connected again for a 50-yard touchdown on 3rd and 8, with Seay's two point conversion catch tying the score. Miami retook the lead on Pete Stoyanovich's field goal in the final quarter. Two plays later, an off-target Humphries pass was tipped by Martin and intercepted by Chris Singleton, setting up a quick Dolphins touchdown drive and a ten-point lead. Humphries' 33-yard pass to Seay moved the Chargers across midfield, but Pupunu lost a fumble at the Miami 5-yard line soon afterwards. The Dolphins then converted three 3rd downs to run the final 4:49 off the clock.

San Diego had knocked Miami out of the previous postseason at the same venue. With Means out of the game, Ronnie Harmon rushed for 52 yards while catching passes for a further 54.

==== Week 11: vs. Kansas City Chiefs ====
Week Eleven: Kansas City Chiefs at San Diego Chargers – Game summary

Quarter	1	2	3	4	Total
Chiefs	7	6	6	3	**22**
Chargers	7	0	0	0	**7**

at Jack Murphy Stadium, San Diego, California

- Date: November 12
- Game time: 1:00 p.m. PST
- Game weather: 63 °F (17.2 °C), relative humidity 87%, wind 7 mph
- Game attendance: 59,285
- Referee: Gordon McCarter
- TV announcers (NBC): Charlie Jones and Randy Cross
- Box score

Game information

**First quarter**

- KAN – Steve Bono 2-yard run (Lin Elliott kick), 6:51. Chiefs 7–0. **Drive: 9 plays, 59 yards, 4:23.**
- SDG – Rodney Culver 1-yard run (John Carney kick), 3:27. Tied 7–7. **Drive: 8 plays, 80 yards, 3:24.**

**Second quarter**

- KAN – Lin Elliott 47-yard field goal, 12:13. Chiefs 10–7. **Drive: 4 plays, 6 yards, 1:28.**
- KAN – Lin Elliott 48-yard field goal, 3:17. Chiefs 13–7. **Drive: 9 plays, 23 yards, 3:57.**

**Third quarter**

- KAN – Marcus Allen 1-yard run (pass failed), 6:16. Chiefs 19–7. **Drive: 12 plays, 82 yards, 5:44.**

**Fourth quarter**

- KAN – Lin Elliott 34-yard field goal, 3:58. Chiefs 22–7. **Drive: 12 plays, 61 yards, 5:52.**

**Top passers**

- KAN – Steve Bono – 17/27, 137 yards, INT
- SDG – Stan Humphries – 21/42, 244 yards

**Top rushers**

- KAN – Greg Hill – 17 rushes, 78 yards
- SDG – Rodney Culver – 11 rushes, 34 yards, TD

**Top receivers**

- KAN – Lake Dawson – 3 receptions, 30 yards
- SDG – Ronnie Harmon – 6 receptions, 96 yards

The Chiefs opened the scoring with a touchdown midway through the opening quarter. San Diego tied the score on an 80-yard drive; Humphries found Harmon for 31 yards, the officials missed Duane Young fumbling at the Kansas City 4-yard line, and Rodney Culver scored two plays later. After Kansas City moved back ahead with a pair of field goals, Harmon's 22-yard catch moved the Chargers across midfield. That drive ended with Carney missing a 45-yard field goal attempt, and the Chiefs led 13–7 at halftime.

Culver was stopped on a 3rd and 1 from the Kansas City 44 early in the 3rd quarter, leading to a punt. Kansas City then drove 82 yard to Marcus Allen's short touchdown run. The next two San Diego drives were stopped by 3rd down sacks of Humphries. After the Chiefs added a field goal, the final serious Charger threat ended when Humphries threw four consecutive incompletions from the Kansas City 45-yard line.

San Diego lost comfortably despite only being outgained by three yards (286 to 283) and outproduced by two first down (19 to 17); the Chiefs possessed the ball for over 35 minutes.

==== Week 12: at Denver Broncos ====
Week Twelve: San Diego Chargers at Denver Broncos – Game summary

Quarter	1	2	3	4	Total
Chargers	7	3	3	14	**27**
Broncos	21	6	0	3	**30**

at Mile High Stadium, Denver, Colorado

- Date: November 19
- Game time: 2:00 p.m. MST
- Game weather: 48 °F (8.9 °C), relative humidity 33%, wind 10 mph
- Game attendance: 74,681
- Referee: Gerald Austin
- TV announcers (NBC): Charlie Jones and Randy Cross
- Box score

Game information

**First quarter**

- DEN – Terrell Davis 2-yard run (Jason Elam kick), 13:27. Broncos 7–0. **Drive: 3 plays, 13 yards, 1:33.**
- DEN – Anthony Miller 34-yard pass from John Elway (Jason Elam kick), 9:14. Broncos 14–0. **Drive: 5 plays, 96 yards, 2:32.**
- DEN – Shannon Sharpe 4-yard pass from John Elway (Jason Elam kick), 0:04. Broncos 21–0. **Drive: 9 plays, 80 yards, 5:01.**
- SDG – Andre Coleman 91-yard kickoff return (John Carney kick), 0:00. Broncos 21–7.

**Second quarter**

- DEN – Jason Elam 20-yard field goal, 9:57. Broncos 24–7. **Drive: 10 plays, 61 yards, 5:03.**
- SDG – John Carney 29-yard field goal, 3:24. Broncos 24–10. **Drive: 8 plays, 13 yards, 3:07.**
- DEN – Jason Elam 35-yard field goal, 0:15. Broncos 27–10. **Drive: 10 plays, 63 yards, 3:09.**

**Third quarter**

- SDG – John Carney 32-yard field goal, 8:07. Broncos 27–13. **Drive: 9 plays, 45 yards, 4:08.**

**Fourth quarter**

- SDG – Ronnie Harmon 12-yard pass from Stan Humphries (John Carney kick), 14:57. Broncos 27–20. **Drive: 7 plays, 64 yards, 2:58.**
- SDG – Rodney Culver 4-yard run (John Carney kick), 9:57. Tied 27–27. **Drive: 7 plays, 72 yards, 3:44.**
- DEN – Jason Elam 32-yard field goal, 0:02. Broncos 30–27. **Drive: 7 plays, 53 yards, 3:41.**

**Top passers**

- SDG – Stan Humphries – 17/28, 206 yards, TD
- DEN – John Elway – 19/34, 290 yards, 2 TD, 2 INT

**Top rushers**

- SDG – Rodney Culver – 15 rushes, 56 yards, TD
- DEN – Chris Warren – 30 rushes, 176 yards, TD

**Top receivers**

- SDG – Tony Martin – 4 receptions, 54 yards
- DEN – Shannon Sharpe – 8 receptions, 137 yards, TD

San Diego gave up an 86-yard return on the opening kickoff, and Denver scored their first touchdown three plays later. After a San Diego three-and-out, Denver took over at their own 4-yard line; Elway led a rapid 96-yard drive with completions of 40 and 34 yards, the latter for a touchdown. A further Chargers punt was followed by a third Denver touchdown and a 21–0 lead with four seconds remaining in the quarter. Coleman ran the ensuing kickoff back 91 yards for a touchdown to put San Diego on the board. The Broncos were close to a further touchdown, but the drive stalled at the San Diego 2-yard line and they settled for a short field goal. A Harrison interception set San Diego up at the Denver 23, leading to a Carney field goal, but Denver responded with their own field goal and led 27–10 at halftime.

Seau intercepted Elway early in the 3rd quarter, setting up another field goal drive. The Broncos had a chance to lead by seventeen points again with three minutes left in the quarter, but missed a 46-yard field goal. Humphries completed all four of his pass attempts on the ensuing drive, connecting with four different receivers for 51 yards and a touchdown to Harmon. After a Denver three-and-out, Humphries again completed four passes out of four, this time covering 60 yards and setting up Culver's game-tying touchdown. The teams exchanged punts, and Denver took over on their 33-yard line with 3:43 to play. Rookie running back Terrell Davis carried the ball on six consecutive plays for 53 yards, setting up the game-winning field goal with two seconds remaining.

It was the Chargers' sixth loss in seven games. Denver outgained them by 463 yards to 269; it was the most yards the San Diego defense gave up all season.

==== Week 13: vs. Oakland Raiders ====
Week Thirteen: Oakland Raiders at San Diego Chargers – Game summary

Quarter	1	2	3	4	Total
Raiders	3	0	0	3	**6**
Chargers	0	6	3	3	**12**

at Jack Murphy Stadium, San Diego, California

- Date: November 27
- Game time: 6:00 p.m. PST
- Game weather: 61 °F (16.1 °C), relative humidity 74%, wind 7 mph
- Game attendance: 60,607
- Referee: Ed Hochuli
- TV announcers (ABC): Al Michaels, Frank Gifford and Dan Dierdorf
- Box score

Game information

**First quarter**

- OAK – Jeff Jaeger 30-yard field goal, 8:01. Raiders 3–0. **Drive: 12 plays, 57 yards, 5:23.**

**Second quarter**

- SDG – John Carney 39-yard field goal, 12:00. Tied 3–3. **Drive: 9 plays, 41 yards, 4:06.**
- SDG – John Carney 24-yard field goal, 4:38. Chargers 6–3. **Drive: 11 plays, 51 yards, 5:47.**

**Third quarter**

- SDG – John Carney 28-yard field goal, 1:22. Chargers 9–3. **Drive: 19 plays, 81 yards, 10:01.**

**Fourth quarter**

- OAK – Jeff Jaeger 26-yard field goal, 8:18. Chargers 9–6. **Drive: 12 plays, 88 yards, 5:58.**
- SDG – John Carney 38-yard field goal, 4:02. Chargers 12–6. **Drive: 4 plays, 7 yards, 2:01.**

**Top passers**

- OAK – Vince Evans – 17/32, 192 yards, 3 INT
- SDG – Stan Humphries – 24/34, 236 yards

**Top rushers**

- OAK – Harvey Williams – 20 rushes, 101 yards
- SDG – Aaron Hayden – 16 rushes, 59 yards

**Top receivers**

- OAK – Daryl Hobbs – 3 receptions, 52 yards
- SDG – Ronnie Harmon – 7 receptions, 76 yards

Oakland opened the scoring with a field goal on their opening drive. Jefferson's 35-yard catch had San Diego in at the Raiders 44-yard line in response, but they progressed no further and punted. Hayden's 13-yard carry opened their next drive, which covered 51 yards ended with Carney's first field goal. The next time they had the ball, Humphries converted a pair of 3rd downs before his 15-yard pass to Harmon on 3rd and 16 moved the ball to the Oakland 6-yard line. Rather than going for it on 4th down, Ross opted for a short field goal which Carney converted. Carney had a further chance as time expired in the half, but missed from 51 yards out and the score remained at 6–3.

The Raiders reached a 2nd and 4 at the San Diego 20, but Dwayne Harper intercepted Vince Evans to end the threat. Starting from his own 11, Humphries converted three 3rd downs with a trio of completions to Harmon and one more to Jefferson at the Oakland 7-yard line. Humphries was sacked on the next play, and San Diego eventually settled for another field goal. Harper intercepted Evans again two plays later, setting up his offense at the Raiders 33; Humphries was sacked on 3rd down, and the Chargers punted. Oakland running back Harvey Williams broke away for a 60-yard run to the San Diego 33-yard line, with Harper making a touchdown-saving tackle. The Raiders eventually settled for their second field goal. Mims sacked Evans the next time Oakland had the ball, forcing a fumble that he recovered himself at the Raiders 27-yard line. San Diego failed to gain a first down, but Carney hit the final field goal of the day with four minutes left. Needing a touchdown to take the lead, Oakland failed on a 4th and 7 from their own 43. They had one more chance, but got only as far as their own 18 before Harper's third interception clinched the win with 56 seconds to play.

As of 2025, Harper's three interceptions remain tied for the most in Chargers history. Oakland had entered the game with an 8–3 record, four games ahead of the Chargers.

==== Week 14: vs. Cleveland Browns ====
Week Fourteen: Cleveland Browns at San Diego Chargers – Game summary

Quarter	1	2	3	4	Total
Browns	0	3	7	3	**13**
Chargers	7	10	0	14	**31**

at Jack Murphy Stadium, San Diego, California

- Date: December 3
- Game time: 1:00 p.m. PST
- Game weather: 60 °F (15.6 °C), relative humidity 80%, wind 7 mph
- Game attendance: 56,358
- Referee: Bob McElwee
- TV announcers (NBC): Don Criqui and Beasley Reece
- Box score

Game information

**First quarter**

- SDG – Aaron Hayden 3-yard run (John Carney kick), 12:16. Chargers 7–0. **Drive: 5 plays, 23 yards, 2:44.**

**Second quarter**

- SDG – John Carney 31-yard field goal, 14:08. Chargers 10–0. **Drive: 17 plays, 84 yards, 8:29.**
- CLE – Matt Stover 34-yard field goal, 5:05. Chargers 10–3. **Drive: 8 plays, 64 yards, 3:50.**
- SDG – Aaron Hayden 1-yard run (John Carney kick), 0:41. Chargers 17–3. **Drive: 10 plays, 80 yards, 4:24.**

**Third quarter**

- CLE – Michael Jackson 28-yard pass from Vinny Testaverde (Matt Stover kick), 8:15. Chargers 17–10. **Drive: 10 plays, 80 yards, 4:42.**

**Fourth quarter**

- SDG – Tony Martin 25-yard pass from Stan Humphries (John Carney kick), 7:00. Chargers 24–10. **Drive: 10 plays, 96 yards, 5:25.**
- SDG – Terrell Fletcher 16-yard run (John Carney kick), 1:54. Chargers 31–10. **Drive: 9 plays, 53 yards, 3:26.**
- CLE – Matt Stover 40-yard field goal, 0:00. Chargers 31–13. **Drive: 10 plays, 44 yards, 1:54.**

**Top passers**

- CLE – Vinny Testaverde – 28/41, 303 yards, TD, INT
- SDG – Stan Humphries – 18/25, 230 yards, TD

**Top rushers**

- CLE – Leroy Hoard – 8 rushes, 20 yards
- SDG – Aaron Hayden – 32 rushes, 127 yards, 2 TD

**Top receivers**

- CLE – Keenan McCardell – 9 receptions, 97 yards
- SDG – Tony Martin – 9 receptions, 132 yards, TD

The Chargers benefitted from a Cleveland fumble on the opening kickoff, leaving them to drive only 23 yards for Hayden's opening touchdown. They began their next drive at their own 4-yard line, converting three 3rd downs on a 17-play drive that ended with Carney's 31-yard field goal. After an exchange of punts, the Browns got on the scoreboard with a field goal. Humphries found Martin for 29 yards on the first play of the Chargers' response; he later converted a 3rd and 1 from the Browns 2-yard line with a quarterback sneak, and Hayden scored again on the next play. Cleveland reached their own 49 late in the half, but were stopped by Willie Clark's interception, and San Diego led 17–3 at the interval.

The Browns halved their deficit the first time they had the ball in the second half; Vinny Testaverde converted a 4th and 1 at his own 41 with a quarterback sneak and finished the drive with a touchdown to Michael Jackson. After two punts each, the Chargers again began a drive at their own 4-yard line. Humphries completed all six of his passes on the ensuing possession, covering 78 of the drive's 96 yards; his 25-yard touchdown to Martin came on a 3rd and 4. The next time San Diego had the ball, Humphries converted 3rd downs with passes to Martin and Harmon and Fletcher ran 16 yards for the final Chargers touchdown.

San Diego rushed for a season-high total of 186 yards, having failed to gain as many as 80 in the four games since Means was injured. By contrast, Cleveland ran for only 26 yards. Hayden's 127 rushing yards was a new single-game high by an individual Charger that season.

==== Week 15: vs. Arizona Cardinals ====
Week Fifteen: Arizona Cardinals at San Diego Chargers – Game summary

Quarter	1	2	3	4	Total
Cardinals	0	14	3	8	**25**
Chargers	0	14	14	0	**28**

at Jack Murphy Stadium, San Diego, California

- Date: December 9
- Game time: 1:00 p.m. PST
- Game weather: 60 °F (15.6 °C), relative humidity 85%, wind 7 mph
- Game attendance: 55,258
- Referee: Walt Coleman
- TV announcers (FOX): Terry Bradshaw and Jimmy Johnson
- Box score

Game information

**First quarter**

- No scoring plays.

**Second quarter**

- SDG – Mark Seay 15-yard pass from Stan Humphries (John Carney kick), 13:08. Chargers 7–0. **Drive: 13 plays, 72 yards, 5:41.**
- ARI – Larry Centers 22-yard pass from Dave Krieg (Greg Davis kick), 7:13. Tied 7–7. **Drive: 4 plays, 40 yards, 1:47.**
- ARI – Clyde Simmons 25-yard interception return (Greg Davis kick), 2:21. Cardinals 14–7.
- SDG – Ronnie Harmon 3-yard pass from Stan Humphries (John Carney kick), 0:37. Tied 14–14. **Drive: 12 plays, 89 yards, 1:44.**

**Third quarter**

- SDG – Andre Coleman 92-yard kickoff return (John Carney kick), 14:45. Chargers 21–14.
- SDG – Mark Seay 38-yard pass from Stan Humphries (John Carney kick), 9:19. Chargers 28–14. **Drive: 6 plays, 60 yards, 3:16.**
- ARI – Greg Davis 36-yard field goal, 4:47. Chargers 28–17. **Drive: 4 plays, 7 yards, 1:05.**

**Fourth quarter**

- ARI – Stevie Anderson 12-yard pass from Dave Krieg (Stevie Anderson pass from Dave Krieg), 1:43. Chargers 28–25. **Drive: 12 plays, 67 yards, 3:38.**

**Top passers**

- ARI – Dave Krieg – 24/40, 283 yards, 2 TD
- SDG – Stan Humphries – 26/41, 288 yards, 3 TD, 4 INT

**Top rushers**

- ARI – Garrison Hearst – 11 rushes, 18 yards
- SDG – Aaron Hayden – 24 rushes, 84 yards

**Top receivers**

- ARI – Rob Moore – 5 receptions, 104 yards
- SDG – Mark Seay – 7 receptions, 114 yards, 2 TD

Culver was stopped on a 4th and 1 near midfield in the opening quarter, but the Cardinals missed a field goal and San Diego scored on their next drive; Seay caught a 15-yard touchdown on 3rd and 9. The Chargers committed three turnovers in the 2nd quarter: Martin's fumble set up a 40-yard touchdown drive for Arizona, Humphries was intercepted but the Chargers defense forced a punt, then another Humphries interception was run in for a touchdown by Clyde Simmons with 2:21 to play in the half. Humphries passed on all 12 plays on the next drive, converting a 4th and 10 from the Cardinals 38 with a 23-yard completion to Seay and finding Harmon for the touchdown three plays later. The teams entered halftime tied at 14–14.

Coleman put the Chargers ahead to stay when he ran the second half kickoff back 92 yard for a touchdown. On their first offensive series of the half, Humphries and Martin connected for 6 yards on a 3rd and 5, then threw a 38-yard touchdown to Coleman on the next play. Harper recovered a fumble near his own goal line soon afterwards. Another Humphries interception set up an Arizona field goal, and a fourth ended a drive that was at midfield. The Chargers had their sixth turnover with 5:21 to play when Gilbert fumbled on a fake field goal attempt. Dave Krieg led Arizona 67 yards the other way for his second touchdown pass, which came on 4th and 10, and added a two-point conversion to reduce their deficit to three. Seau recovered an onside kick attempt, then Hayden ran for 12 yards to ensure San Diego could run the clock out.

O'Neal had three of the Chargers' five sacks. The win, coupled with other results that weekend, meant San Diego could be sure of making the playoffs with victories in their following two games.

==== Week 16: at Indianapolis Colts ====
Week Sixteen: San Diego Chargers at Indianapolis Colts – Game summary

Quarter	1	2	3	4	Total
Chargers	7	0	7	13	**27**
Colts	3	7	0	14	**24**

at RCA Dome, Indianapolis, Indiana

- Date: December 17
- Game time: 4:00 p.m. EST
- Game weather: Dome
- Game attendance: 55,318
- Referee: Gary Lane
- TV announcers (NBC): Don Criqui and Beasley Reece
- Box score

Game information

**First quarter**

- IND – Cary Blanchard 36-yard field goal, 8:32. Colts 3–0. **Drive: 12 plays, 58 yards, 6:28.**
- SDG – Tony Martin 51-yard pass from Stan Humphries (John Carney kick), 2:51. Chargers 7–3. **Drive: 6 plays, 52 yards, 2:32.**

**Second quarter**

- IND – Ken Dilger 13-yard pass from Jim Harbaugh (Cary Blanchard kick), 1:48. Colts 10–7. **Drive: 11 plays, 81 yards, 4:25.**

**Third quarter**

- SDG – Stan Humphries 1-yard run (John Carney kick), 2:56. Chargers 14–10. **Drive: 8 plays, 29 yards, 3:33.**

**Fourth quarter**

- IND – Cary Blanchard 42-yard field goal, 13:16. Chargers 14–13. **Drive: 9 plays, 51 yards, 4:40.**
- SDG – Tony Martin 38-yard pass from Stan Humphries (John Carney kick), 11:21. Chargers 21–13. **Drive: 5 plays, 72 yards, 1:55.**
- IND – Marshall Faulk 1-yard run (Floyd Turner pass from Jim Harbaugh), 6:58. Tied 21–21. **Drive: 10 plays, 85 yards, 4:23.**
- SDG – John Carney 33-yard field goal, 1:59. Chargers 24–21. **Drive: 11 plays, 47 yards, 3:48.**
- IND – Cary Blanchard 50-yard field goal, 0:48. Tied 24–24. **Drive: 8 plays, 37 yards, 1:11.**
- SDG – John Carney 43-yard field goal, 0:03. Chargers 27–24. **Drive: 5 plays, 50 yards, 0:45.**

**Top passers**

- SDG – Stan Humphries – 21/40, 272 yards, 2 TD, INT
- IND – Jim Harbaugh – 20/43, 285 yards, TD, INT

**Top rushers**

- SDG – Aaron Hayden – 26 rushes, 96 yards
- IND – Marshall Faulk – 15 rushes, 48 yards, TD

**Top receivers**

- SDG – Tony Martin – 10 receptions, 168 yards, 2 TD
- IND – Sean Dawkins – 6 receptions, 123 yards

After the Colts opened the scoring with a field goal, Coleman ran the ensuing kickoff back 47 yards to his own 48. San Diego gained one first down, then were pushed back by a pair of penalties and faced 3rd and 20 from their own 49; Humphries found Martin behind the defense for a 51-yard touchdown. Carney missed a 51-yard field goal that could have extended the lead. Indianapolis also missed a field goal, before Jim Harbaugh converted a trio of 3rd downs and put them ahead 10–7 with a touchdown pass. That remained the halftime score after Carney failed from 39 yards with seconds remaining.

Coleman's 29-yard punt return set his offense up at the Colts 29-yard midway through the 3rd quarter; Humphries converted a 3rd and 7 with an 8-yard pass to Martin and scored himself with a quarterback sneak on 3rd and goal from the 1. Following an Indianapolis field goal, Martin beat the Colts defense for another long touchdown, but the Colts came straight back with a touchdown and two-point conversion to tie the score. Humphries was intercepted by Quentin Coryatt on the next play, but Willie Clark intercepted Harbaugh three plays later, and San Diego put together a 47-yard drive capped by Carney's first field goal with 1:59 left. The Colts reached the San Diego 33-yard line before Harbaugh threw three incompletions and they had to settle for a game-tying field goal with 48 seconds left. A 26-yard Humphries-to-Pupunu completion then moved the ball to the Colts' 49, before Coryatt dropped another potential interception. Humphries found Harmon for 17 yards on the next play; after a Hayden run netted 7 yards, Carney's winning kick came from 43 yards out with three seconds remaining.

Martin had 168 receiving yards while no other Chargers wide receiver had more than 9. Both teams were heavily flagged, with San Diego committing 10 penalties for 99 yards and Indianapolis 9 for 103 yards.

==== Week 17: at New York Giants ====
Week Seventeen: San Diego Chargers at New York Giants – Game summary

Quarter	1	2	3	4	Total
Chargers	0	3	7	17	**27**
Giants	3	14	0	0	**17**

at Giants Stadium, New York, New York

- Date: December 23
- Game time: 12:30 p.m. EST
- Game weather: 34 °F (1.1 °C), relative humidity 64%, wind 15 mph, wind chill 24
- Game attendance: 50,243
- Referee: Ron Blum
- TV announcers (NBC): Marv Albert and Cris Collinsworth
- Box score

Game information

**First quarter**

- NYG – Brad Daluiso 30-yard field goal, 3:57. Giants 3–0. **Drive: 16 plays, 73 yards, 8:16.**

**Second quarter**

- NYG – Dave Brown 3-yard run (Brad Daluiso kick), 11:29. Giants 10–0. **Drive: 5 plays, 23 yards, 3:16.**
- SDG – John Carney 30-yard field goal, 7:04. Giants 10–3. **Drive: 4 plays, 4 yards, 1:21.**
- NYG – Rodney Hampton 1-yard run (Brad Daluiso kick), 0:14. Giants 17–3. **Drive: 13 plays, 71 yards, 6:50.**

**Third quarter**

- SDG – Aaron Hayden 8-yard run (John Carney kick), 9:51. Giants 17–10. **Drive: 7 plays, 38 yards, 3:37.**

**Fourth quarter**

- SDG – Rodney Culver 8-yard run (John Carney kick), 9:04. Tied 17–17. **Drive: 12 plays, 55 yards, 5:41.**
- SDG – Shaun Gayle 99-yard interception return (John Carney kick), 5:44. Chargers 24–17.
- SDG – John Carney 45-yard field goal, 3:37. Chargers 27–17. **Drive: 6 plays, 13 yards, 1:10.**

**Top passers**

- SDG – Gale Gilbert – 12/21, 97 yards
- NYG – Dave Brown – 21/36, 209 yards, INT

**Top rushers**

- SDG – Aaron Hayden – 22 rushes, 80 yards, TD
- NYG – Rodney Hampton – 20 rushes, 60 yards, TD

**Top receivers**

- SDG – Tony Martin – 4 receptions, 37 yards
- NYG – Keith Elias – 4 receptions, 46 yards

Humphries was knocked out of the game with a neck injury on the Chargers' second offensive series, by which time they were already trailing to a field goal. Gilbert replaced him for the rest of the game. Coleman fumbled a punt early in the 2nd quarter, leading to a Giants touchdown five plays later. The Chargers also benefitted from a fumbled punt later in the quarter, with Fletcher recovering at the New York 16-yard line to set up Carney's 30-yard field goal. The Giants used up most of the half's final seven minutes on a 13-play touchdown drive and led 17–3 at the interval.

Seau recovered a fumble on the third play of the second half; Culver converted a 4th and 1 before Aaron Hayden scored two plays later. New York had a chance to add to their lead, but Brad Daluiso missed a 42-yard field goal. In the final quarter, Gilbert converted a 4th and 6 with a 13-yard completion to Martin and Culver ran in the game-tying touchdown on 4th and 2 from the 8. The Giants quickly moved into position to respond, but on 2nd and goal from the 12 Seau hit Dave Brown as he threw, and the ball looped up to be intercepted by Shaun Gayle at the 1 yard line; he returned it 99 yards for the go-ahead touchdown. Shortly afterwards, O'Neal forced a fumble, Bush recovered, and Carney clinched the win with a 45-yard field goal. By winning, San Diego clinched a wild card spot in the playoffs.

Throughout the game, New York fans threw snowballs onto the field with such frequency that game officials threatened to stop play and award San Diego the victory. In the fourth quarter, Chargers equipment manager Sid Brooks was hit near his left eye by an ice ball. He collapsed and was unconscious for 30 seconds before being placed on a stretcher.

== Standings ==
AFC West
	W	L	T	PCT	PF	PA	STK
^{(1)} Kansas City Chiefs	13	3	0	.813	358	241	W2
^{(4)} San Diego Chargers	9	7	0	.563	321	323	W5
Seattle Seahawks	8	8	0	.500	363	366	L1
Denver Broncos	8	8	0	.500	388	345	W1
Oakland Raiders	8	8	0	.500	348	332	L6

== Postseason ==
Round	Date	Opponent (seed)	Result	Record	Venue	Attendance	Recap
Wildcard	December 31	Indianapolis Colts (5)	L 20–35	0–1	Jack Murphy Stadium	61,182	Recap

=== Game summaries ===
==== AFC Wild Card Playoffs: vs. Indianapolis Colts ====
AFC Wild Card Playoffs: (#5) Indianapolis Colts at (#4) San Diego Chargers – Game summary

Quarter	1	2	3	4	Total
Colts	0	14	7	14	35
Chargers	3	7	7	3	20

at Jack Murphy Stadium, San Diego

- Date: January 8
- Game time: 1:00 p.m. PST
- Game weather: 57 °F (14 °C), relative humidity 90%, wind 5 mph
- Game attendance: 61,182
- Referee: Gary Lane
- TV announcers (NBC): Dick Enberg, Phil Simms, and Paul Maguire
- Box score

Game information

First quarter

- SDG – John Carney 54-yard field goal, 9:28. Chargers 3–0. Drive: 9 plays, 30 yards, 3:25.

Second quarter

- IND – Ken Dilger 2-yard pass from Jim Harbaugh (Cary Blanchard kick), 14:03. Colts 7–3. Drive: 8 plays, 27 yards, 3:45.
- SDG – Alfred Pupunu 6-yard pass from Stan Humphries (John Carney kick), 5:48. Chargers 10–7. Drive: 18 plays, 68 yards, 8:15.
- IND – Zack Crockett 33-yard rush (Cary Blanchard kick), 1:47. Colts 14–10. Drive: 8 plays, 80 yards, 4:01.

Third quarter

- SDG – Shawn Jefferson 11-yard pass from Stan Humphries (John Carney kick), 4:20. Chargers 17–14. Drive: 12 plays, 90 yards, 6:50.
- IND – Sean Dawkins 42-yard pass from Jim Harbaugh (Cary Blanchard kick), 0:41. Colts 21–17. Drive: 7 plays, 81 yards, 3:39.

Fourth quarter

- SDG – John Carney 30-yard field goal, 11:53. Colts 21–20. Drive: 8 plays, 55 yards, 3:48.
- IND – Zack Crockett 66-yard rush (Cary Blanchard kick), 11:28. Colts 28–20. Drive: 1 play, 66 yards, 0:25.
- IND – Jim Harbaugh 3-yard rush (Cary Blanchard kick), 6:55. Colts 35–20. Drive: 6 plays, 23 yards, 3:31.

Top passers

- IND – Jim Harbaugh – 16/27, 175 yards, 2 TD, INT
- SDG – Stan Humphries – 23/47, 292 yards, 2 TD, 4 INT

Top rushers

- IND – Zack Crockett – 13 rushes, 147 yards, 2 TD
- SDG – Aaron Hayden – 18 rushes, 80 yards

Top receivers

- IND – Floyd Turner – 5 receptions, 64 yards
- SDG – Ronnie Harmon – 10 receptions, 133 yards

Humphries returned from his injury and ran 10 yards to convert a 3rd and 6 on the Chargers' first possession; that drive ended with Carney's 54-yard field goal. San Diego forced a punt, but Humphries was intercepted on the next play, setting up Indianapolis at the San Diego 33-yard line. They moved to a 2nd and 10 from the 22 before Seau made an interception at his own 1. The Chargers could gain only 7 yards before punting, and Ray Buchanan's 46-yard return set the Colts up at the Chargers 27-yard line; Harbaugh's first touchdown came on 3rd and goal from the 2. San Diego responded with an 18-play, 68-yard drive in which they converted six separate 3rd down situations. Humphries converted one with a quarterback sneak and five with passes: three to Harmon, one to Martin and one to Pupunu for the touchdown. Indianapolis retook the lead with Zack Crockett's first touchdown run, 1:47 before halftime. Humphries led San Diego from their own 10-yard line to the Colts 17, but his pass to the end zone was deflected and intercepted with 17 seconds left, and Indianapolis remained 14–10 up at the break.

Both teams punted to start the second half, then the Chargers went 90 yards to retake the lead: Hayden converted a 3rd and 1, Humphries and Pupunu combined to convert a 3rd and 5, and Jefferson scored with an 11-yard catch. The Colts again responded on the following drive, with Harbaugh's second touchdown covering 42 yards on 3rd and 7. Fletcher and Hayden ran for gains of 20 and 15 yards back to back as the Chargers drove into Colts territory, but the drive broke down at the 12-yard line and they took and field goal to draw within a point. The Colts pulled away after that: Crockett broke away for his second touchdown on the next play after eluding O'Neal near the line of scrimmage, Humphries was intercepted, and Harbaugh ran in a touchdown. Humphries was intercepted for a fourth time as San Diego tried to make a comeback.

Crockett replaced an injured Marshall Faulk during the game—he ran for 147 yards after gaining none in the regular season.. The Chargers outgained Indianapolis by 429 yards to 333, but committed four of the game's five turnovers.

== Awards ==
Three Chargers were named to the AFC Pro Bowl squad, with Seau and Bennett as starters and O'Neal a backup. Bennett was also named a first-team All-Pro by the Associated Press, with Seau in the second team.
