= Aaron Hayden =

Aaron Hayden may refer to:

- Aaron Hayden (American football) (born 1973), American football running back
- Aaron Hayden (footballer) (born 1997), English football defender
