= Terrance Shaw =

American football player (born 1973)

No. 29, 22, 25
- Position: Cornerback

Personal information
- Born: November 11, 1973 (age 52); Marshall, Texas, U.S.
- Listed height: 6 ft 0 in (1.83 m)
- Listed weight: 200 lb (91 kg)

Career information
- High school: Marshall
- College: Stephen F. Austin
- NFL draft: 1995: 2nd round, 34th overall pick

Career history
- San Diego Chargers (1995–1999); Miami Dolphins (2000); New England Patriots (2001); Oakland Raiders (2002–2003); Carolina Panthers (2004)*; Minnesota Vikings (2004)
- * Offseason or practice squad member only

Awards and highlights
- Super Bowl champion (XXXVI)

Career NFL statistics
- Tackles: 472
- Interceptions: 11
- Fumble recoveries: 2
- Stats at Pro Football Reference

Terrance Bernard Shaw (born November 11, 1973) is an American former professional football player who was a cornerback in the National Football League (NFL). He was born in Marshall, Texas. As a member of the New England Patriots, he won Super Bowl XXXVI.

== Early life ==
Shaw attended Marshall High School in Marshall, Texas and was a letterman in football. As a senior, he was a first-team All-District selection, a first-team All-Region selection, and he led his team to a Texas High School Football State Title.

== College career ==
Shaw attended Stephen F. Austin State University and was a Business major and a four-year letterman in football. In football, as a senior, he was a first-team Division I-AA All-American and a first-team All-Southland Conference selection. As a junior, he garnered 67 tackles and was an All-Conference Honorable Mention selection. As a sophomore, he started the first five games, before tearing the anterior cruciate ligament in his right knee.

Shaw is a member of Phi Beta Sigma fraternity. He became a member during his time at Stephen F. Austin State University.

== Professional career ==
Pre-draft measurables
Height	Weight	Arm length	Hand span	40-yard dash	10-yard split	20-yard split	20-yard shuttle	Vertical jump	Broad jump	Bench press
5 ft 11 1/8 in (1.81 m)	188 lb (85 kg)	31 7/8 in (0.81 m)	9 3/4 in (0.25 m)	4.54 s	1.64 s	2.68 s	4.06 s	34.5 in (0.88 m)	10 ft 2 in (3.10 m)	14 reps

Shaw was selected in the second round of the 1995 NFL draft by the San Diego Chargers. During his career, he played as a cornerback for the San Diego Chargers, Miami Dolphins, Minnesota Vikings, New England Patriots, and Oakland Raiders in the NFL. On February 3, 2002, in the Louisiana Superdome in New Orleans, Louisiana, before a packed house of almost 73,000, Shaw helped the Patriots beat the St. Louis Rams in Super Bowl XXXVI in 2001. Shaw also played in Super Bowl XXXVII with the Oakland Raiders in 2002. In 2000, Shaw was a part of the Miami Dolphins' secondary and was ranked #1 in the NFL. That secondary led the league with 25 picks. Shaw had six playoff appearances in a ten-year career.

== NFL career statistics ==
Legend
**Bold**	Career high

=== Regular season ===
Year	Team	Games		Tackles					Interceptions					Fumbles			
Year	Team	GP	GS	Cmb	Solo	Ast	Sck	TFL	Int	Yds	TD	Lng	PD	FF	FR	Yds	TD
1995	SD	**16**	14	58	53	5	0.0	-	1	31	0	31	-	0	0	0	0
1996	SD	**16**	**16**	**85**	**72**	**13**	0.0	-	**3**	**78**	0	**36**	-	0	0	0	0
1997	SD	**16**	**16**	71	66	5	0.0	-	1	11	0	11	-	0	**1**	0	0
1998	SD	13	13	40	35	5	0.0	-	2	0	0	0	-	0	0	0	0
1999	SD	8	8	28	24	4	0.0	**2**	0	0	0	0	3	0	0	0	0
2000	MIA	11	3	27	22	5	0.0	1	1	0	0	0	4	0	0	0	0
2001	NE	13	3	26	23	3	0.0	1	0	0	0	0	4	0	0	0	0
2002	OAK	**16**	7	38	32	6	0.0	**2**	2	-2	0	3	**10**	0	**1**	0	0
2003	OAK	**16**	8	64	52	12	0.0	1	0	0	0	0	7	0	0	0	0
2004	MIN	15	4	35	31	4	0.0	0	1	22	0	22	5	0	0	0	0
		140	92	472	410	62	0.0	7	11	140	0	36	33	0	2	0	0

=== Playoffs ===
Year	Team	Games		Tackles					Interceptions					Fumbles			
Year	Team	GP	GS	Cmb	Solo	Ast	Sck	TFL	Int	Yds	TD	Lng	PD	FF	FR	Yds	TD
1995	SD	1	0	1	1	0	0.0	-	0	0	0	0	-	0	0	0	0
2000	MIA	2	0	0	0	0	0.0	-	0	0	0	0	-	0	0	0	0
2001	NE	**3**	0	5	5	0	0.0	0	0	0	0	0	**4**	0	0	0	0
2002	OAK	**3**	0	**10**	**9**	1	0.0	0	0	0	0	0	3	0	0	0	0
2004	MIN	2	0	6	4	**2**	0.0	0	0	0	0	0	0	0	**2**	0	0
		11	0	22	19	3	0.0	0	0	0	0	0	7	0	2	0	0

== Personal life ==
He is married to Shawneeque Watkins Shaw, and they have nine children - a daughter Ashley and sons Terrance Jr., Teris, Thomas, Trysten, Tierney, Trinity, Tylend, and daughter Timberlynd.

He coaches his son's youth league select football team, the SGP Rams.
