= Aaron Hayden (American football) =

American football player (born 1973)

No. 24, 33
- Position: Running back

Personal information
- Born: April 13, 1973 (age 53); Detroit, Michigan, U.S.
- Listed height: 6 ft 0 in (1.83 m)
- Listed weight: 216 lb (98 kg)

Career information
- High school: Mumford (Detroit)
- College: Tennessee
- NFL draft: 1995: 4th round, 104th overall pick

Career history
- San Diego Chargers (1995–1996); Green Bay Packers (1997); Philadelphia Eagles (1998)

Career NFL statistics
- Rushing yards: 784
- Rushing average: 3.6
- Receptions: 8
- Receiving yards: 74
- Total touchdowns: 4
- Stats at Pro Football Reference

Aaron Chautezz Hayden (born April 13, 1973) is an American former professional football player who was a running back in the National Football League (NFL) for the San Diego Chargers, the Green Bay Packers, and the Philadelphia Eagles. Hayden played college football for the Tennessee Volunteers and was selected in the fourth round of the 1995 NFL draft. He played four years in the NFL, and retired in 1998.

== College career ==
Hayden attended the University of Tennessee, where he played for the Volunteers for his entire college career.

=== College statistics ===
Season	GP	Rushing				Receiving			
Season	GP	Att	Yds	Avg	TD	Rec	Yds	Avg	TD
1991	11	145	704	4.9	7	10	99	9.9	1
1992	11	63	321	5.1	1	4	65	16.3	1
1993	11	28	217	7.8	1	0	0	0.0	0
1994	11	157	819	5.2	3	7	115	16.4	0
Total	44	393	2061	5.2	12	21	279	13.3	2
^{*}Includes bowl game. The NCAA does not include bowl games in official statistics for seasons prior to 2002.
Source: Aaron Hayden at Sports Reference

== Professional career ==
Hayden was drafted by the San Diego Chargers during the 1995 NFL draft in the fourth round with the 104th overall pick.

=== San Diego Chargers ===
During the 1995 season, Hayden would make his NFL regular season debut in Week 11 against the Denver Broncos. However, it wouldn't be until Week 14 before getting his first career touchdown in a 31–13 win against the Cleveland Browns. He would have 2 touchdowns that game. He would also make a start in the playoffs where the Chargers would lose against the Indianapolis Colts in the wild card round. Hayden would rush 80 yards in 18 carries in the game.

Hayden would return to San Diego for the 1996 season for 11 games, where he would record 55 carries for 166 yards, with no touchdowns.

=== Green Bay Packers ===
For the 1997 season, Hayden was signed by the Green Bay Packers. With Green Bay, he rushed for 148 yards with 32 carries in the regular season, helping the Packer make the playoffs. Throughout the playoffs, Hayden would see little time on the field. The Packers would end up making Super Bowl XXXII, losing 24–31 against the Denver Broncos.

== NFL career statistics ==
=== Regular season ===
Year	Team	Games		Rushing						Receiving						Fumbles	
Year	Team	GP	GS	Att	Yards	Avg	Lng	TD	FD	Rec	Yards	Avg	Lng	TD	FD	Fum	Lost
1995	SD	6	4	128	470	3.7	20	3	21	5	53	10.6	16	0	4	0	0
1996	SD	11	0	55	166	3.0	13	0	12	1	10	10.0	10	0	1	1	0
1997	GB	14	0	32	148	4.6	21	1	6	2	11	5.5	7	0	2	0	0
1998	PHI	1	0	0	0	0	0	0	0	0	0	0.0	0	0	0	0	0
Career		32	4	215	784	3.6	21	4	39	8	74	9.3	16	0	7	1	0

=== Postseason ===
Year	Team	Games		Rushing						Receiving						Fumbles	
Year	Team	GP	GS	Att	Yards	Avg	Lng	TD	FD	Rec	Yards	Avg	Lng	TD	FD	Fum	Lost
1995	SD	1	1	18	80	4.4	15	0	3	0	0	0	0	0	0	0	0
1997	GB	3	0	0	0	0	0	0	0	0	0	0	0	0	0	0	0
Career		4	1	18	80	4.4	15	0	3	0	0	0	0	0	0	0	0

== Personal life ==
His son, Dallan Hayden, plays college football for the Colorado Buffaloes. Dallan also used to play for the Ohio State Buckeyes
