= Shawn Jefferson =

American football player and coach (born 1969)

New York Jets
- Title: Wide receivers coach

Personal information
- Born: February 22, 1969 (age 57); Jacksonville, Florida, U.S.
- Listed height: 5 ft 11 in (1.80 m)
- Listed weight: 185 lb (84 kg)

Career information
- Position: Wide receiver (No. 80, 84, 87)
- High school: William M. Raines (Jacksonville)
- College: UCF (1987–1990)
- NFL draft: 1991: 9th round, 240th overall pick

Career history

Playing
- Houston Oilers (1991)*; San Diego Chargers (1991–1995); New England Patriots (1996–1999); Atlanta Falcons (2000–2002); Detroit Lions (2003)
- * Offseason or practice squad member only

Coaching
- Detroit Lions (2006–2012); Offensive assistant (2006); Assistant wide receivers coach (2007); Wide receivers coach (2008–2012); Tennessee Titans (2013–2015) Wide receivers coach; Miami Dolphins (2016–2018) Wide receivers coach; New York Jets (2019–2020) Assistant head coach & wide receivers coach; Arizona Cardinals (2021–2022); Wide receivers coach (2021); Associate head coach & wide receivers coach (2022); Carolina Panthers (2023) Wide receivers coach; New York Jets (2024–present) Wide receivers coach

Awards and highlights
- New England Patriots All-1990s Team

Career NFL statistics
- Receptions: 470
- Receiving yards: 7,023
- Receiving touchdowns: 29
- Stats at Pro Football Reference

Vanchi LaShawn "Shawn" Jefferson Sr. (born February 22, 1969) is an American professional football coach and former wide receiver who is the wide receivers coach for the New York Jets of the National Football League (NFL). He previously served as the associate head coach and wide receivers coach for the Arizona Cardinals from 2021 to 2022 and also previously served as an assistant coach for the Miami Dolphins, Tennessee Titans, and Detroit Lions.

== College career ==
Jefferson played college football at the University of Central Florida.

== Professional career ==
Pre-draft measurables
Height	Weight	Arm length	Hand span	40-yard dash	10-yard split	20-yard split	20-yard shuttle	Vertical jump
5 ft 11 1/4 in (1.81 m)	169 lb (77 kg)	30 in (0.76 m)	9 5/8 in (0.24 m)	4.53 s	1.61 s	2.66 s	4.19 s	30.0 in (0.76 m)
All values from NFL Combine

Jefferson was selected by the Houston Oilers in the ninth round of the 1991 NFL draft. In his career, Jefferson appeared in 195 games (along with 12 postseason games), and two Super Bowl appearances (Super Bowl XXIX and Super Bowl XXXI). He finished his career with 470 receptions for 7,023 yards and 29 touchdowns.

== NFL career statistics ==
Legend
	Led the league
**Bold**	Career high

=== Regular season ===
Year	Team	Games		Receiving				
Year	Team	GP	GS	Rec	Yds	Avg	Lng	TD
1991	SDG	16	3	12	125	10.4	29	1
1992	SDG	16	1	29	377	13.0	51	2
1993	SDG	16	4	30	391	13.0	39	2
1994	SDG	16	16	43	627	14.6	52	3
1995	SDG	16	15	48	621	12.9	45	2
1996	NWE	15	15	50	771	15.4	42	4
1997	NWE	16	14	54	**841**	15.6	**76**	2
1998	NWE	16	16	34	771	**22.7**	61	2
1999	NWE	16	16	40	698	17.5	68	**6**
2000	ATL	16	14	**60**	822	13.7	49	2
2001	ATL	16	6	37	539	14.6	48	2
2002	ATL	13	7	27	394	14.6	63	1
2003	DET	7	3	6	46	7.7	13	0
		195	130	470	7,023	14.9	76	29

=== Playoffs ===
Year	Team	Games		Receiving				
Year	Team	GP	GS	Rec	Yds	Avg	Lng	TD
1992	SDG	2	0	1	10	10.0	10	0
1994	SDG	3	3	7	75	10.7	16	0
1995	SDG	1	1	3	33	11.0	12	**1**
1996	NWE	3	2	**10**	**143**	**14.3**	**38**	0
1997	NWE	2	2	**10**	111	11.1	19	0
1998	NWE	1	1	4	30	7.5	10	0
2002	ATL	2	1	1	10	10.0	10	**1**
		14	10	36	412	11.4	38	2

== Coaching career ==
=== Detroit Lions ===
In 2006, Jefferson was hired by the Detroit Lions as an offensive assistant. In 2007, he was promoted to wide receivers coach.

=== Tennessee Titans ===
In 2013, Jefferson was hired by the Tennessee Titans as their wide receivers coach.

=== Miami Dolphins ===
On January 12, 2016, Jefferson was hired by the Miami Dolphins as their wide receivers coach under head coach Adam Gase.

=== New York Jets ===
In 2019, Jefferson followed Gase to be his assistant head coach and wide receivers coach with the New York Jets.

=== Arizona Cardinals ===
On January 19, 2021, Jefferson was hired by the Arizona Cardinals as their wide receivers coach under head coach Kliff Kingsbury, replacing David Raih. On May 10, 2022, Jefferson was promoted to associate head coach.

=== Carolina Panthers ===
On February 19, 2023, the Carolina Panthers hired Jefferson as their wide receivers coach.

=== New York Jets (second stint) ===
On January 31 2024, Jefferson was hired by the New York Jets as their wide receivers coach under head coach Robert Saleh. In February 2025, the Jets announced that Jefferson would be retained on the coaching staff of new head coach, Aaron Glenn.

== Personal life ==
Jefferson's son is Van Jefferson, a wide receiver for the Washington Commaders. He played college football at Ole Miss and Florida.
