= David Hendrix =

American football player (born 1972)

No. 38
- Position: Safety

Personal information
- Born: May 29, 1972 (age 54); Jesup, Georgia
- Listed height: 6 ft 1 in (1.85 m)
- Listed weight: 213 lb (97 kg)

Career information
- High school: Norcross (GA) Meadowcreek
- College: Georgia Tech
- NFL draft: 1995: undrafted

Career history
- San Diego Chargers (1995–1997)
- Stats at Pro Football Reference

David Hendrix (born May 29, 1972) is a former player in the National Football League. He played for the San Diego Chargers from 1995 to 1997. He played collegiality for the Georgia Tech football team.
