= Troy Sienkiewicz =

American football player (born 1972)

No. 65, 72, 99
- Positions: Guard, tackle

Personal information
- Born: May 27, 1972 (age 54); Charleston, South Carolina, U.S.
- Listed height: 6 ft 5 in (1.96 m)
- Listed weight: 313 lb (142 kg)

Career information
- High school: Alamogordo (NM)
- College: New Mexico State
- NFL draft: 1995: 6th round, 177th overall pick

Career history
- San Diego Chargers (1995–1998); Detroit Fury (2002)

Career NFL statistics
- Games played: 28
- Games started: 6
- Fumble recoveries: 2
- Stats at Pro Football Reference

Troy Sienkiewicz (born May 27, 1972) is an American former professional football player who was a guard and tackle for the San Diego Chargers of the National Football League (NFL) from 1996 to 1998. After walking on, he played college football for the New Mexico State Aggies. He was selected by the Chargers in the sixth round of the 1995 NFL draft with the 177th overall pick.
