= 'Omar Ellison =

American football player (born 1971)

No. 84
- Position: Wide receiver

Personal information
- Born: October 8, 1971 (age 55); Griffin, Georgia, U.S.
- Listed height: 6 ft 1 in (1.85 m)
- Listed weight: 200 lb (91 kg)

Career information
- High school: Griffin
- College: Florida State
- NFL draft: 1995: 5th round, 162nd overall pick

Career history
- San Diego Chargers (1995–1996); Green Bay Packers (1997)*; Atlanta Falcons (1997)*
- * Offseason or practice squad member only

Awards and highlights
- National champion (1993)

Career NFL statistics
- Receptions: 4
- Receiving yards: 21
- Stats at Pro Football Reference

'Omar Ryan Ellison (born October 8, 1971) is an American former professional football player who was a wide receiver for the San Diego Chargers of the National Football League (NFL). He played college football for the Florida State Seminoles. He was part of the 1993 Seminoles team that won the national championship. He was selected by the Chargers in the fifth round of the 1995 NFL draft with the 162nd overall pick. He made his NFL debut in Week 13 of the 1995 season against the Oakland Raiders. He appeared in ten games in the 1996 season and had three catches for 15 yards. After the 1996 season, he appeared on the Green Bay Packers and Atlanta Falcons practice squads.
