= Mark Montreuil =

Canadian football player (born 1971)

No. 40, 23
- Position: Defensive back

Personal information
- Born: December 29, 1971 (age 54); Montreal, Quebec, Canada
- Listed height: 6 ft 2 in (1.88 m)
- Listed weight: 200 lb (91 kg)

Career information
- High school: Beaconsfield (QC)
- University: Concordia (QC)
- NFL draft: 1995: 7th round, 237th overall pick

Career history
- San Diego Chargers (1995–1997); → London Monarchs (1996)

Career NFL statistics
- Tackles: 20
- Fumble recoveries: 1
- Stats at Pro Football Reference

Mark Allen Montreuil (born December 29, 1971) is a Canadian former professional football defensive back who played three seasons for the San Diego Chargers of the National Football League (NFL). He was selected by the Chargers in the seventh round of the 1995 NFL draft. He played university football for Concordia University.

Montreuil was born in Montreal, Quebec.
