= 1993 San Diego Chargers season =

NFL team 34th season

- Owner: Alex Spanos
- General manager: Bobby Beathard
- Head coach: Bobby Ross
- Home stadium: Jack Murphy Stadium

Results
- Record: 8–8
- Division place: 4th AFC West
- Playoffs: Did not qualify
- All-Pros: 1: LB Junior Seau (1st team)
- Pro Bowlers: 3: WR Anthony Miller; DE Leslie O'Neal; LB Junior Seau

The 1993 San Diego Chargers season was the team's 34th season, their 33rd in San Diego, and 24th in the National Football League.

The 1993 season began with the team trying to improve on their 11–5 record in 1992. Instead, they slipped to an 8–8 record. A tougher schedule made wins harder to come by — their beaten opponents averaged a 0.500 win percentage, compared to 0.369 the year before. Football Outsiders nonetheless rated the 1993 Chargers as the fourth-best team that season, and the second best in the AFC behind their conference rival Chiefs.

Uncertainty at the quarterback position contributed to a slow start. Stan Humphries suffered a shoulder injury during the pre-season, and posted a quarterback rating of just 46.12 through the first four games; John Friesz replaced him, posting better numbers but going 2–4 as a starter. Humphries returned for the final six games with a greatly improved rating of 90.7, and San Diego won four of them, but missed the playoffs by a single win.

The pass-catching corps were largely unchanged. Only two pass catchers from 1992, Rod Bernstine and Brian Brennan, did not return for 1993. Anthony Miller led the team in all major receiving categories (84 receptions, 1,162 yards, 7 touchdowns), while Ronnie Harmon had 73 catches out of the backfield. Marion Butts (746 yards, 4 touchdowns) split time in the backfield with rookie Natrone Means (645 yards, 8 touchdowns). On defense, the leaders were Leslie O'Neal (12.0 sacks), Junior Seau (129 tackles), and Darren Carrington (7 interceptions, plus 1 fumble recovery). Veteran cornerback Gill Byrd missed the entire season with injury and retired afterwards. Kicker John Carney started the season in fine form, running the consecutive field goal streak he'd started in 1992 up to a new NFL record of 29. His form slipped as the season wore on, and he finished on 31 field goals from 40 attempts, making 77.5 percent of his kicks.

== Offseason ==
Additions	Subtractions
T Stan Brock (Saints)	G David Richards (Lions)
CB Brian Davis (Seahawks)	LB Henry Rolling (Rams)
	T Broderick Thompson (Eagles)
	LB Kevin Murphy (Seahawks)
	QB Bob Gagliano (Falcons)
	T Leo Goeas (Rams)

=== NFL draft ===
1993 San Diego Chargers draft
Round	Pick	Player	Position	College	Notes
1	22	Darrien Gordon	Cornerback	Stanford	
2	41	Natrone Means *	Running back	North Carolina	
3	64	Joe Cocozzo	Guard	Michigan	
4	95	Raylee Johnson	Defensive end	Arkansas	
4	99	Lewis Bush	Linebacker	Washington State	
5	134	Walter Dunson	Wide receiver	Middle Tennessee	
6	161	Eric Castle	Defensive back	Oregon	
7	188	Doug Miller	Linebacker	South Dakota State	
8	222	Trent Green *	Quarterback	Stanford	
Made roster * Made at least one Pro Bowl during career

== Personnel ==
=== Staff ===
1993 San Diego Chargers staff
Front office: Chairman of the board and president – Alex Spanos; Vice chairman – Dean Spanos; General manager – Bobby Beathard; Assistant general manager – Dick Daniels; Director of player personnel – Billy Devaney; Director of pro personnel – Rudy Feldman; Director of college scouting – John Hinek; Coordinator of football operations – Marty Hurney; Head coaches: Head coach – Bobby Ross; Offensive coaches: Quarterbacks/passing game coordinator – Jack Reilly; Tight ends/h-backs/running game coordinator – Ralph Friedgen; Offensive backs – Sylvester Croom; Wide receivers – Jerry Sullivan; Offensive line – Carl Mauck; Quality control – John Misciagna	Defensive coaches: Defensive coordinator – Bill Arnsparger; Defensive line – George O'Leary; Linebackers – Dale Lindsey; Secondary – John Fox; Special teams coaches: Special teams – Chuck Priefer; Special teams assistant – Stan Kwan; Strength and conditioning: Strength and conditioning – John Dunn; Strength and conditioning assistant – Chip Morton

=== Roster ===
1993 San Diego Chargers roster
Quarterbacks (QB): 7 Trent Green; 12 Stan Humphries; 17 John Friesz; Running backs (RB): 32 Eric Bieniemy KR; 35 Marion Butts; 33 Ronnie Harmon; 20 Natrone Means; Wide receivers (WR): 85 Johnnie Barnes; 80 Shawn Jefferson; 81 Nate Lewis KR; 83 Anthony Miller; 84 Mark Seay; Tight ends (TE): 82 Mike Dyal; 88 Deems May; 86 Alfred Pupunu; 87 Duane Young	Offensive linemen (OL): 67 Stan Brock T; 68 Joe Cocozzo G; 53 Courtney Hall C; 69 Darrell Hamilton T; 74 Eric Jonassen T; 63 Raymond Smoot G; 72 Harry Swayne T; 64 Curtis Whitley C; 65 Mike Withycombe G; 70 Mike Zandofsky G; Defensive linemen (DL): 99 Raylee Johnson DE; 98 Shawn Lee DT; 94 Chris Mims DE; 91 Leslie O'Neal DE; 97 Israel Stanley DE; 90 Reggie White DT; 96 Blaise Winter DT	Linebackers (LB): 95 Jeff Brady MLB; 58 Lewis Bush OLB; 51 Terry Crews OLB; 56 Steve Hendrickson OLB; 54 Doug Miller MLB; 50 Gary Plummer MLB; 55 Junior Seau OLB; Defensive backs (DB): 29 Darren Carrington SS; 44 Eric Castle FS; 31 Brian Davis CB; 26 Floyd Fields SS; 27 Donald Frank CB; 40 James Fuller FS; 21 Darrien Gordon CB/PR; 30 Marquez Pope CB; 24 Stanley Richard FS; 25 Sean Vanhorse CB; Special teams (ST): 52 Sam Anno LS; 3 John Carney K; 10 John Kidd P	Practice squad: 47 Chris Thomas WR; 49 Michael Williams CB; Reserve: 34 Eric Boles WR (IR); 22 Gill Byrd CB (IR); 23 Walter Dunson RB (IR); 92 Burt Grossman DE (IR); 71 Joe Milinichik G (IR); 73 Mike Mooney T (IR); 77 Eric Moten G (IR); 89 Derrick Walker TE (IR); 57 Jerrol Williams LB (IR); Rookies in italics 53 active, 9 reserve, 2 practice squad

== Preseason ==
Week	Date	Opponent	Result	Record	Venue	Attendance
1	August 7	New England Patriots	W 13–7	1–0	Jack Murphy Stadium	
2	August 14	at Los Angeles Rams	W 23–17	2–0	Anaheim Stadium	
3	August 21	Phoenix Cardinals	W 10–3	3–0	Jack Murphy Stadium	
4	August 28	at San Francisco 49ers	L 14–30	3–1	Candlestick Park	

== Regular season ==
=== Schedule ===
Week	Date	Opponent	Result	Record	Venue	Attendance
1	September 5	**Seattle Seahawks**	**W** 18–12	1–0	Jack Murphy Stadium	58,039
2	September 12	at **Denver Broncos**	**L** 17–34	1–1	Mile High Stadium	75,074
3	September 19	Houston Oilers	**W** 18–17	2–1	Jack Murphy Stadium	58,519
4	Bye					
5	October 3	at **Seattle Seahawks**	**L** 14–31	2–2	Kingdome	54,778
6	October 10	at Pittsburgh Steelers	**L** 3–16	2–3	Three Rivers Stadium	55,264
7	October 17	**Kansas City Chiefs**	**L** 14–17	2–4	Jack Murphy Stadium	60,729
8	Bye					
9	October 31	at **Los Angeles Raiders**	**W** 30–23	3–4	Los Angeles Memorial Coliseum	45,122
10	November 7	at Minnesota Vikings	**W** 30–17	4–4	Hubert H. Humphrey Metrodome	55,527
11	November 14	Chicago Bears	**L** 13–16	4–5	Jack Murphy Stadium	58,459
12	November 21	**Los Angeles Raiders**	**L** 7–12	4–6	Jack Murphy Stadium	60,615
13	November 29	at Indianapolis Colts	**W** 31–0	5–6	Hoosier Dome	54,110
14	December 5	**Denver Broncos**	**W** 13–10	6–6	Jack Murphy Stadium	60,233
15	December 12	Green Bay Packers	**L** 13–20	6–7	Jack Murphy Stadium	57,930
16	December 19	at **Kansas City Chiefs**	**L** 24–28	6–8	Arrowhead Stadium	74,778
17	December 27	Miami Dolphins	**W** 45–20	7–8	Jack Murphy Stadium	60,311
18	January 2, 1994	at Tampa Bay Buccaneers	**W** 32–17	8–8	Tampa Stadium	35,587
Note: Intra-division opponents are in **bold** text.

=== Game summaries ===
==== Week 1: vs. Seattle Seahawks ====
Week One: Seattle Seahawks at San Diego Chargers – Game summary

Quarter	1	2	3	4	Total
Seahawks	7	3	0	2	**12**
Chargers	6	6	0	6	**18**

at Jack Murphy Stadium, San Diego, California

- Date: September 5
- Game time: 1:00 p.m. PDT
- Game weather: 70 °F (21.1 °C), relative humidity 82%, wind 8 miles per hour (13 km/h; 7.0 kn)
- Game attendance: 58,039
- Referee: Howard Roe
- TV announcers (NBC): Dan Hicks and Joe Gibbs
- Box score

Game information

**First quarter**

- SEA – Joe Nash 13-yard interception return (John Kasay kick), 14:07. Seahawks 7–0.
- SDG – John Carney 26-yard field goal, 5:54. Seahawks 7–3. **Drive: 10 plays, 61 yards, 5:33.**
- SDG – John Carney 44-yard field goal, 3:26. Seahawks 7–6. **Drive: 4 plays, 0 yards, 0:52.**

**Second quarter**

- SEA – John Kasey 27-yard field goal, 11:45. Seahawks 10–6. **Drive: 12 plays, 76 yards, 6:41.**
- SDG – John Carney 50-yard field goal, 8:07. Seahawks 10–9. **Drive: 10 plays, 37 yards, 3:38.**
- SDG – John Carney 32-yard field goal, 3:21. Chargers 12–10. **Drive: 7 plays, 38 yards, 2:50.**

**Third quarter**

- No scoring plays.

**Fourth quarter**

- SDG – John Carney 51-yard field goal, 12:44. Chargers 15–10. **Drive: 12 plays, 52 yards, 5:55.**
- SDG – John Carney 19-yard field goal, 5:35. Chargers 18–10. **Drive: 12 plays, 63 yards, 6:31.**
- SEA – Safety, Kidd ran out of end zone, 0:00. Chargers 18–12.

**Top passers**

- SEA – Rick Mirer – 20/27, 154 yards, INT
- SDG – Stan Humphries – 13/30, 123 yards, 2 INT

**Top rushers**

- SEA – Chris Warren – 12 rushes, 38 yards
- SDG – Marion Butts – 15 rushes, 87 yards

**Top receivers**

- SEA – Brian Blades – 5 receptions, 54 yards
- SDG – Anthony Miller – 6 receptions, 56 yards

In a game with no offensive touchdowns, John Carney's six field goals brought San Diego their first opening day win for seven years. They had to overcome a terrible start, Stan Humphries' second pass attempt of the season being batted in the air by Cortez Kennedy for Joe Nash to intercept and return 13 yards for a touchdown. Humphries was intercepted again only three plays later, but Seattle missed a field goal, and the Charger offense began to move the ball. Four consecutive field goal drives had them up 12–10 at the half.

Marion Butts rushed for 87 yards on 15 carries, but had to leave the game early in the 3rd quarter. Still, the Chargers managed two more Carney kicks, the latter making it a two score game with just 5:35 to play. The Seahawks responded with a drive deep into Charger territory, but Burt Grossman recovered a fumble at the two. Charger punter John Kidd then gave up an intentional safety as time expired.

Carney's six field goals were a club record; he had successes from 50 and 51 yards out, becoming the first Charger with two 50+ yard field goals in the same game. Humphries wasn't intercepted again after the first two possession, but completed only 13 of 30 for 123 yards and a 27.5 QB rating.

==== Week 2: at Denver Broncos ====
Week Two: San Diego Chargers at Denver Broncos – Game summary

Quarter	1	2	3	4	Total
Chargers	0	0	14	3	**17**
Broncos	0	17	7	10	**34**

at Mile High Stadium, Denver, Colorado

- Date: September 12
- Game time: 2:00 p.m. MDT
- Game weather: 76 °F (24.4 °C), relative humidity 20%, wind 11 miles per hour (18 km/h; 9.6 kn)
- Game attendance: 75,074
- Referee: Ron Blum
- TV announcers (NBC): Charlie Jones and Todd Christensen
- Box score

Game information

**First quarter**

- No scoring plays.

**Second quarter**

- DEN – Arthur Marshall 34-yard pass from John Elway (Jason Elam kick), 13:00. Broncos 7–0. **Drive: 7 plays, 87 yards, 3:01.**
- DEN – Reggie Rivers 12-yard pass from John Elway (Jason Elam kick), 12:09. Broncos 14–0. **Drive: 1 play, 12 yards, 0:06.**
- DEN – Jason Elam 20-yard field goal, 5:21. Broncos 17–0. **Drive: 11 plays, 62 yards, 4:23.**

**Third quarter**

- SDG – Derrick Walker 25-yard pass from Stan Humphries (John Carney kick), 10:07. Broncos 17–7. **Drive: 8 plays, 47 yards, 3:26.**
- SDG – Nate Lewis 24-yard pass from Stan Humphries (John Carney kick), 7:48. Broncos 17–14. **Drive: 4 plays, 35 yards, 1:18.**
- DEN – Rod Bernstine 1-yard run (Jason Elam kick), 0:59. Broncos 24–14. **Drive: 12 plays, 80 yards, 6:49.**

**Fourth quarter**

- SDG – John Carney 30-yard field goal, 9:25. Chargers 24–17. **Drive: 17 plays, 69 yards, 6:34.**
- DEN – Jason Elam 54-yard field goal, 3:36. Broncos 27–17. **Drive: 4 plays, 7 yards, 1:31.**
- DEN – Robert Delpino 1-yard run (Jason Elam kick), 1:55. Broncos 34–17. **Drive: 3 plays, 6 yards, 0:26.**

**Top passers**

- SDG – Stan Humphries – 28/49, 298 yards, 2 TD, INT
- DEN – John Elway – 24/34, 294 yards, 2 TD, INT

**Top rushers**

- SDG – Ronnie Harmon – 9 rushes, 42 yards
- DEN – Rod Bernstine – 14 rushes, 39 yards, TD

**Top receivers**

- SDG – Arthur Marshall – 6 receptions, 76 yards, TD
- DEN – Nate Lewis – 10 receptions, 119 yards, TD

The Chargers' first loss of the season arrived after a comeback attempt faltered. Two John Elway touchdown passes either side of an Eric Bieniemy fumble helped Denver lead 17–0 at halftime. Cornerback Marquez Pope played a key role in shifting momentum after the break, intercepting a pass and forcing a fumble on consecutive Bronco possessions. Both turnovers set the Chargers up with excellent field position, and both chances were converted, Humphries hitting Derrick Walker and Nate Lewis for touchdowns.

Now trailing only 17–14, San Diego were close to a stop on the next drive, but Elway converted a 3rd and 19 with a 46-yard completion to the one yard line. Ex-Charger Rod Bernstine scored a play later. Following an exchange of field goals, Humphries was intercepted and Denver iced the win.

Nate Lewis had 10 receptions and 119 yards, both career highs.

==== Week 3: vs. Houston Oliers ====
Week Three: Houston Oliers at San Diego Chargers – Game summary

Quarter	1	2	3	4	Total
Oilers	0	14	0	3	**17**
Chargers	3	6	3	6	**18**

at Jack Murphy Stadium, San Diego, California

- Date: September 19
- Game time: 1:00 p.m. PDT
- Game weather: 66 °F (18.9 °C), relative humidity 76%, wind 7 miles per hour (11 km/h; 6.1 kn)
- Game attendance: 58,519
- Referee: Ed Hochuli
- TV announcers (NBC): Charlie Jones and Todd Christensen
- Box score

Game information

**First quarter**

- SDG – John Carney 34-yard field goal, 5:30. Chargers 3–0. **Drive: 6 plays, 29 yards, 2:15.**

**Second quarter**

- SDG – John Carney 34-yard field goal, 13:55. Chargers 6–0. **Drive: 8 plays, 36 yards, 1:53.**
- SDG – John Carney 27-yard field goal, 10:53. Chargers 9–0. **Drive: 4 plays, -1 yards, 1:31.**
- HOU – Webster Slaughter 2-yard pass from Warren Moon (Al Del Greco kick), 5:31. Chargers 9–7. **Drive: 11 plays, 80 yards, 5:22.**
- HOU – Darryll Lewis 47-yard interception return (Al Del Greco kick), 3:13. Oilers 14–9.

**Third quarter**

- SDG – John Carney 27-yard field goal, 3:33. Oilers 14–12. **Drive: 8 plays, 69 yards, 3:28.**

**Fourth quarter**

- SDG – John Carney 36-yard field goal, 9:21. Chargers 15–14. **Drive: 6 plays, 10 yards, 2:40.**
- HOU – Al Del Greco 27-yard field goal, 4:59. Oilers 17–15. **Drive: 9 plays, 53 yards, 4:22.**
- SDG – John Carney 27-yard field goal, 0:03. Chargers 18–17. **Drive: 13 plays, 75 yards, 4:56.**

**Top passers**

- HOU – Warren Moon – 19/37, 199 yards, TD, 4 INT
- SDG – John Friesz – 8/15, 110 yards

**Top rushers**

- HOU – Lorenzo White – 13 rushes, 47 yards
- SDG – Marion Butts – 16 rushes, 66 yards

**Top receivers**

- HOU – Webster Slaughter – 7 receptions, 60 yards, TD
- SDG – Nate Lewis – 2 receptions, 57 yards

It was déjà vu for the Chargers, as John Carney kicked six field goals for the second consecutive home game. San Diego's defense played a huge role throughout the game; in the first half, Darren Carrington and Junior Seau both intercepted Warren Moon, either side of a Carrington fumble recovery. Each of these takeaways was converted into a field goal. Carney's third, from 27 yards out, gave him a streak of 26 consecutive regular season successes, stretching back to the previous season. This broke an NFL record set by Morten Andersen only a week earlier.

Moon got Houston in the end zone on their next drive, then Humphries threw his second pick six of the season, and it was 14–9 at the break. Humphries continued to struggle in the 3rd quarter, and was pulled for John Friesz, who completed a 47-yard pass downfield to Nate Lewis on his very first play. That set up Carney's fourth kick. Moon was intercepted on the next two Houston possessions: the first of these, by Sean Vanhorse, ended an Oiler threat; the second was Seau again, and led to Carney's fifth field goal and a 15–14 lead.

Moon was also benched at this point - his backup Cody Carlson drove Houston to a 3rd and 2 at the San Diego 8, whereupon a touchdown pass to Haywood Jeffires was incorrectly ruled to have been out of bounds. As a result, the Oliers settled for a field goal, and led by only two points with 4:59 to play. Friesz then completed four passes for 46 yards, as San Diego went 75 yards in 13 plays, culminating in Carney's final kick with just 3 seconds on the clock.

Humphries finished with just 7 completions from 26 attempts, for 73 yards and an interception, for a 23.6 QB rating.

==== Week 5: at Seattle Seahawks ====
Week Five: San Diego Chargers at Seattle Seahawks – Game summary

Quarter	1	2	3	4	Total
Chargers	7	0	0	7	**14**
Seahawks	7	10	7	7	**31**

at Kingdome, Seattle, Washington

- Date: October 3
- Game time: 1:00 p.m. PDT
- Game weather: Dome
- Game attendance: 54,778
- Referee: Dick Hantak
- TV announcers (NBC): Tom Hammond and Cris Collinsworth
- Box score

Game information

**First quarter**

- SEA – Rick Mirer 2-yard run (John Kasay kick), 10:24. Seahawks 7–0. **Drive: 10 plays, 81 yards, 4:36.**
- SDG – Marion Butts 2-yard run (John Carney kick), 2:37. Tied 7–7. **Drive: 6 plays, 65 yards, 2:16.**

**Second quarter**

- SEA – John Kasay 33-yard field goal, 7:39. Seahawks 10–7. **Drive: 16 plays, 65 yards, 6:28.**
- SEA – Brian Blades 17-yard pass from Dan McGwire (John Kasay kick), 0:10. Seahawks 17–7. **Drive: 9 plays, 43 yards, 1:37.**

**Third quarter**

- SEA – Chris Warren 1-yard run (John Kasay kick), 7:20. Seahawks 24–7. **Drive: 7 plays, 58 yards, 3:33.**

**Fourth quarter**

- SEA – Kelvin Martin 18-yard pass from Rick Mirer (John Kasay kick), 4:59. Seahawks 31–7. **Drive: 7 plays, 49 yards, 4:07.**
- SDG – Anthony Miller 11-yard pass from John Friesz (John Carney kick), 2:11. Seahawks 31–14. **Drive: 9 plays, 66 yards, 2:48.**

**Top passers**

- SDG – Stan Humphries – 12/27, 141 yards, 2 INT
- SEA – Rick Mirer – 25/40, 282 yards, TD

**Top rushers**

- SDG – Marion Butts – 11 rushes, 62 yards, TD
- SEA – Chris Warren – 23 rushes, 32 yards, TD

**Top receivers**

- SDG – Anthony Miller – 10 receptions, 123 yards, TD
- SEA – Brian Blades – 10 receptions, 132 yards, TD

Stan Humphries struggled again, and the Chargers slipped to 2–2. They trailed 7–0 when John Carney missed a 48-yard field goal, bringing his streak of consecutive kicks without a miss to an end at 29 (a record since surpassed). A Marion Butts run levelled the scores, but Humphries threw two interceptions thereafter as the Seahawks pulled away.

This time, Humphries completed 12 of 27 for 141 yards, with a QB rating of 30.0; three of the six worst ratings of his career came in the first four games of this season. John Friesz, who came in and threw a consolation score to Anthony Miller, was named the starter for the next game.

==== Week 6: at Pittsburgh Steelers ====
Week Six: San Diego Chargers at Pittsburgh Steelers – Game summary

Quarter	1	2	3	4	Total
Chargers	0	3	0	0	**3**
Steelers	3	3	7	3	**16**

at Three Rivers Stadium, Pittsburgh, Pennsylvania

- Date: October 10
- Game time: 4:00 p.m. EDT
- Game weather: 42 °F (5.6 °C), relative humidity 58%, wind 12 miles per hour (19 km/h; 10 kn)
- Game attendance: 55,264
- Referee: Gary Lane
- TV announcers (NBC): Dan Hicks and Dan Hampton
- Box score

Game information

**First quarter**

- PIT – Gary Anderson 37-yard field goal, 0:19. Steelers 3–0. **Drive: 11 plays, 36 yards, 6:36.**

**Second quarter**

- PIT – Gary Anderson 34-yard field goal, 1:56. Steelers 6–0. **Drive: 9 plays, 31 yards, 4:25.**
- SDG – John Carney 33-yard field goal, 0:03. Steelers 6–3. **Drive: 11 plays, 50 yards, 1:53.**

**Third quarter**

- PIT – Levon Kirkland 16-yard defensive fumble return (Gary Anderson kick), 3:25. Steelers 13–3.

**Fourth quarter**

- PIT – Gary Anderson 35-yard field goal, 7:47. Steelers 16–3. **Drive: 9 plays, 38 yards, 4:33.**

**Top passers**

- PIT – Neil O'Donnell – 16/25, 156 yards
- SDG – John Friesz – 15/26, 107 yards, INT

**Top rushers**

- PIT – Barry Foster – 23 rushes, 110 yards
- SDG – Ronnie Harmon – 3 rushes, 12 yards

**Top receivers**

- PIT – Eric Green – 5 receptions, 81 yards
- SDG – Anthony Miller – 6 receptions, 61 yards

John Friesz struggled on his first start of the season, hindered by a rushing attack which could gain only 19 yards on 20 carries. Still, the defense kept them in the game at half time, trailing only 6–3. On the first Charger drive of the 3rd quarter, Friesz executed a successful QB sneak on 4th and 1, earning a 1st and goal at the 8. However, Kevin Greene hit Friesz as he threw on the next play, causing a goal line interception and knocking the quarterback out of the game with a concussion.

Humphries came in, but was soon sacked by Greg Lloyd, causing a fumble which Levon Kirkland recovered and ran in for the game's only touchdown. San Diego finished with 138 yards, their worst tally for 16 years.

==== Week 7: vs. Kansas City Chiefs ====
Week Seven: Kansas City Chiefs at San Diego Chargers – Game summary

Quarter	1	2	3	4	Total
Chiefs	7	3	0	7	**17**
Chargers	0	7	0	7	**14**

at Jack Murphy Stadium, San Diego, California

- Date: October 17
- Game time: 1:00 p.m. PDT
- Game weather: 64 °F (17.8 °C), relative humidity 75%, wind 9 miles per hour (14 km/h; 7.8 kn)
- Game attendance: 60,729
- Referee: Jerry Markbreit
- TV announcers (NBC): Dick Enberg and Bob Trumpy
- Box score

Game information

**First quarter**

- KAN – Marcus Allen 15-yard pass from Joe Montana (Nick Lowery kick), 4:25. Chiefs 7–0. **Drive: 14 plays, 63 yards, 4:50.**

**Second quarter**

- SDG – Natrone Means 7-yard run (John Carney kick), 9:20. Tied 7–7. **Drive: 5 plays, 43 yards, 2:18.**
- KAN – Nick Lowery 37-yard field goal, 0:00. Chiefs 10–7. **Drive: 7 plays, 35 yards, 1:34.**

**Third quarter**

- No scoring plays.

**Fourth quarter**

- SDG – Anthony Miller 4-yard pass from John Friesz (John Carney kick), 13:55. Chargers 14–10. **Drive: 3 plays, 3 yards, 0:41.**
- KAN – Marcus Allen 1-yard run (Nick Lowery kick), 1:57. Chiefs 17–14. **Drive: 9 plays, 80 yards, 1:30.**

**Top passers**

- KAN – Joe Montana – 21/39, 284 yards, TD, INT
- SDG – John Friesz – 18/35, 218 yards, TD, INT

**Top rushers**

- KAN – Marcus Allen – 13 rushes, 46 yards, TD
- SDG – Marion Butts – 11 rushes, 38 yards

**Top receivers**

- KAN – Willie Davis – 4 receptions, 77 yards
- SDG – Anthony Miller – 6 receptions, 105 yards, TD

San Diego dropped a thriller to lose their third straight. Shortly after Anthony Miller had an 89-yard touchdown reception chalked off for a Harry Swayne hold, the Chiefs opened the scoring, veterans Joe Montana and Marcus Allen combing from 15 yards out. The Chargers were forced to punt on their next possession, but John Kidd's monster 67 yard kick pinned Kansas City at their own three. This shift in field position set San Diego up for a 36-yard touchdown drive, rookie Natrone Means powering over the goal line for his first career touchdown. Montana and Friesz then exchanged interceptions, before a Nick Lowery field goal made it 10–7 at the break.

John Carney had a chance to tie the scores in the 3rd quarter, but saw his kick blocked. Early in the 4th, Darrien Gordon returned a punt 54 yards to the three, and Miller caught the go-ahead touchdown pass on 3rd and goal. Lowery then hit the upright from 35 yards out, before Carney had another one blocked. Taking over on the 20 with 3:27 to play, Montana then led his team on the game-winning drive, converting a 4th and 10 along the way. Allen scored from a yard out with 1:57 remaining. Friesz also managed to convert a 4th and 10, but then threw four consecutive incompletions from the Kansas City 47.

Anthony Miller caught 6 passes for 105 yards and a touchdown. This result broke a string of nine consecutive home wins for San Diego, including one in the playoffs.

==== Week 9: at Los Angeles Raiders ====
Week Nine: San Diego Chargers at Los Angeles Raiders – Game summary

Quarter	1	2	3	4	Total
Chargers	7	3	14	6	**30**
Raiders	10	0	7	6	**23**

at Los Angeles Memorial Coliseum, Los Angeles, California

- Date: October 31
- Game time: 1:00 p.m. PST
- Game weather: 66 °F (18.9 °C), relative humidity 85%, wind 9 miles per hour (14 km/h; 7.8 kn)
- Game attendance: 45,122
- Referee: Red Cashion
- TV announcers (NBC): Charlie Jones and Todd Christensen
- Box score

Game information

**First quarter**

- RAI – Tim Brown 71-yard pass from Jeff Hostetler (Jeff Jaeger kick), 13:39. Raiders 7–0. **Drive: 1 play, 71 yards, 0:10.**
- SDG – Anthony Miller 29-yard pass from John Friesz (John Carney kick), 8:24. Tied 7–7. **Drive: 9 plays, 78 yards, 5:15.**
- RAI – Jeff Jaeger 38-yard field goal, 0:38. Raiders 10–7. **Drive: 15 plays, 78 yards, 7:46.**

**Second quarter**

- SDG – John Carney 45-yard field goal, 0:21. Tied 10–10. **Drive: 6 plays, 39 yards, 0:45.**

**Third quarter**

- RAI – Tim Brown 38-yard pass from Jeff Hostetler (Jeff Jaeger kick), 10:18. Raiders 17–10. **Drive: 7 plays, 81 yards, 4:42.**
- SDG – Marion Butts 12-yard run (John Carney kick), 6:06. Tied 17–17. **Drive: 8 plays, 80 yards, 4:12.**
- SDG – Donald Frank 102-yard interception return (John Carney kick), 3:24. Chargers 24–17.

**Fourth quarter**

- SDG – John Carney 36-yard field goal, 13:38. Chargers 27–17. **Drive: 7 plays, 47 yards, 3:23.**
- RAI – Jeff Jaeger 21-yard field goal, 9:55. Chargers 27–20. **Drive: 7 plays, 76 yards, 3:43.**
- SDG – John Carney 38-yard field goal, 1:49. Chargers 30–20. **Drive: 15 plays, 60 yards, 8:06.**
- RAI – Jeff Jaeger 31-yard field goal, 0:20. Chargers 30–23. **Drive: 8 plays, 50 yards, 1:29.**

**Top passers**

- SDG – John Friesz – 13/25, 162 yards, TD
- RAI – Jeff Hostetler – 20/32, 424 yards, 2 TD, 2 INT

**Top rushers**

- SDG – Natrone Means – 14 rushes, 68 yards
- RAI – Greg Robinson – 13 rushes, 53 yards

**Top receivers**

- SDG – Ronnie Harmon – 5 receptions, 89 yards
- RAI – Tim Brown – 5 receptions, 156 yards, 2 TD

Donald Frank's 102 yard interception return gave the Chargers a much-needed win. Los Angeles got off to an ideal start, Jeff Hostetler finding Tim Brown for a 71-yard touchdown on their very first play. San Diego responded quickly with Anthony Miller's 29-yard touchdown reception on the next drive. Following an exchange of field goals, it was 10–10 at halftime.

The Hostetler-to-Brown connection produced another long touchdown in the 3rd quarter (38 yards); San Diego again responded on the ensuing drive, Shawn Jefferson gaining 33 yards on a reverse before Butts ran it in from 12 yards out. Hostetler, who passed for 424 yards on the day, moved his team to the Charger 5 with a 55-yard completion, but threw his next pass straight at Frank, who ran the length of the field for an easy touchdown. Gary Plummer intercepted Hostetler on the next drive, and the teams traded field goals through the final quarter.

While Friesz only threw for 162 yards, the rushing duo of Means and Butts gained 68 and 64 yards respectively.

==== Week 10: at Minnesota Vikings ====
Week Ten: San Diego Chargers at Minnesota Vikings – Game summary

Quarter	1	2	3	4	Total
Chargers	7	3	6	14	**30**
Vikings	0	3	14	0	**17**

at Hubert H. Humphrey Metrodome, Minneapolis, Minnesota

- Date: November 7
- Game time: 12:00 p.m. CST
- Game weather: Dome
- Game attendance: 54,960
- Referee: Bob McElwee
- TV announcers (NBC): Charlie Jones and Todd Christensen
- Box score

Game information

**First quarter**

- SDG – Marion Butts 3-yard run (John Carney kick), 2:54. Chargers 7–0. **Drive: 10 plays, 80 yards, 6:23.**

**Second quarter**

- SDG – John Carney 36-yard field goal, 7:00. Chargers 10–0. **Drive: 9 plays, 28 yards, 3:40.**
- MIN – Fuad Reveiz 20-yard field goal, 3:35. Chargers 10–3. **Drive: 8 plays, 76 yards, 3:25.**

**Third quarter**

- SDG – Anthony Miller 66-yard pass from John Friesz (kick failed), 12:02. Chargers 16–3. **Drive: 5 plays, 75 yards, 2:58.**
- MIN – Anthony Carter 9-yard pass from Sean Salisbury (Fuad Reveiz kick), 7:57. Chargers 16–10. **Drive: 9 plays, 80 yards, 4:05.**
- MIN – Barry Word 1-yard run (Fuad Reveiz kick), 1:17. Vikings 17–16. **Drive: 9 plays, 78 yards, 3:56.**

**Fourth quarter**

- SDG – Natrone Means 7-yard run (John Carney kick), 10:12. Chargers 23–17. **Drive: 7 plays, 61 yards, 3:54.**
- SDG – Shawn Jefferson 18-yard pass from John Friesz (John Carney kick), 9:11. Chargers 30–17. **Drive: 3 plays, 21 yards, 1:01.**

**Top passers**

- SDG – John Friesz – 20/32, 268 yards, 2 TD
- MIN – Sean Salisbury – 29/47, 347 yards, TD, INT

**Top rushers**

- SDG – Natrone Means – 17 rushes, 105 yards, TD
- MIN – Barry Word – 8 rushes, 11 yards, TD

**Top receivers**

- SDG – Anthony Miller – 7 receptions, 142 yards, TD
- MIN – Anthony Carter – 10 receptions, 164 yards, TD

A balanced offensive performance saw the Chargers even their record at 4–4. A short TD run by Butts opened the scoring, and San Diego led 10–3 at the break. A 66-yard strike from Friesz to Miller extended the advantage, but John Carney missed the conversion, and back-to-back touchdown drives by Minnesota put the Vikings up by a point.

San Diego regained control with a trio of 4th quarter turnovers. First, Sean Vanhorse intercepted Sean Salisbury, and Means put the Chargers ahead seven plays later. On the ensuing kickoff, Marquez Pope forced a fumble, and Friesz found Shawn Jefferson for the Chargers' second score in barely a minute. Finally, Chris Mims knocked the ball from Salisbury's hands, with Leslie O'Neal recovering to end the final Viking threat.

Friesz went 20 of 32 for 268 yards with two touchdowns and no interceptions, while Miller caught 7 balls for 142 yards and one score. Means had 17 carries for 105 yards and a touchdown - the first 100-yard game of his career.

==== Week 11: vs. Chicago Bears ====
Week Eleven: Chicago Bears at San Diego Chargers – Game summary

Quarter	1	2	3	4	Total
Bears	0	6	10	0	**16**
Chargers	3	7	0	3	**13**

at Jack Murphy Stadium, San Diego, California

- Date: November 14
- Game time: 5:00 p.m. PST
- Game weather: 60 °F (15.6 °C), relative humidity 65%, wind 12 miles per hour (19 km/h; 10 kn)
- Game attendance: 58,459
- Referee: Bernie Kukar
- TV announcers (ESPN): Mike Patrick (sportscaster) and Joe Theismann
- Box score

Game information

**First quarter**

- SDG – John Carney 28-yard field goal, 9:04. Chargers 3–0. **Drive: 11 plays, 40 yards, 5:28.**

**Second quarter**

- SDG – John Kidd 2-yard run (John Carney kick), 14:49. Chargers 10–0. **Drive: 9 plays, 54 yards, 4:07.**
- CHI – Kevin Butler 33-yard field goal, 4:52. Chargers 10–3. **Drive: 11 plays, 39 yards, 5:13.**
- CHI – Kevin Butler 54-yard field goal, 2:26. Chargers 10–6. **Drive: 4 plays, 1 yard, 1:00.**

**Third quarter**

- CHI – Kevin Butler 20-yard field goal, 4:55. Chargers 10–9. **Drive: 12 plays, 66 yards, 6:47.**
- CHI – Curtis Conway 38-yard pass from Jim Harbaugh (Kevin Butler kick), 4:08. Bears 16–10. **Drive: 1 play, 38 yards, 0:08.**

**Fourth quarter**

- SDG – John Carney 26-yard field goal, 11:05. Bears 16–13. **Drive: 19 plays, 67 yards, 8:03.**

**Top passers**

- CHI – Jim Harbaugh – 13/24, 159 yards, TD, INT
- SDG – John Friesz – 19/37, 184 yards

**Top rushers**

- CHI – Tim Worley – 11 rushes, 33 yards
- SDG – Natrone Means – 18 rushes, 69 yards

**Top receivers**

- CHI – Curtis Conway – 2 receptions, 50 yards, TD
- SDG – Anthony Miller – 4 receptions, 46 yards

John Carney's late miss saw the Chargers drop a close game. San Diego sent their field goal unit onto the field at the end of their first three drives. The first two times, Carney attempted kicks - one successful, one blocked. The third time, holder John Kidd swept around left end for a touchdown and a 10–0 lead. Chicago then took charge, three field goals and a Jim Harbaugh touchdown pass putting them up 16–10 late in the 3rd quarter. The Chargers converted three 3rd downs and a 4th down on their next drive, but were eventually forced to settle for a field goal.

Plummer then intercepted Harbaugh in Charger territory, and Friesz led a 46-yard drive. However, Carney's kick missed badly to the left with 1:11 to play, and Chicago ran the clock out.

==== Week 12: vs. Los Angeles Raiders ====
Week Twelve: Los Angeles Raiders at San Diego Chargers – Game summary

Quarter	1	2	3	4	Total
Raiders	3	3	3	3	**12**
Chargers	0	0	0	7	**7**

at Jack Murphy Stadium, San Diego, California

- Date: November 21
- Game time: 1:00 p.m. PST
- Game weather: 61 °F (16.1 °C), relative humidity 35%, wind 5 miles per hour (8.0 km/h; 4.3 kn)
- Game attendance: 60,615
- Referee: Johnny Grier
- TV announcers (NBC): Dick Enberg and Bob Trumpy
- Box score

Game information

**First quarter**

- RAI – Jeff Jaeger 20-yard field goal, 3:38. Raiders 3–0. **Drive: 19 plays, 86 yards, 11:22.**

**Second quarter**

- RAI – Jeff Jaeger 20-yard field goal, 2:33. Raiders 6–0. **Drive: 13 plays, 89 yards, 7:16.**

**Third quarter**

- RAI – Jeff Jaeger 37-yard field goal, 7:17. Raiders 9–0. **Drive: 9 plays, 42 yards, 5:56.**

**Fourth quarter**

- RAI – Jeff Jaeger 27-yard field goal, 3:29. Raiders 12–0. **Drive: 15 plays, 68 yards, 8:13.**
- SDG – Nate Lewis 9-yard pass from Stan Humphries (John Carney kick), 1:53. Raiders 12–7. **Drive: 6 plays, 73 yards, 1:36.**

**Top passers**

- RAI – Jeff Hostetler – 19/31, 270 yards, INT
- SDG – Stan Humphries – 8/12, 84 yards, TD, INT

**Top rushers**

- RAI – Greg Robinson – 21 rushes, 89 yards
- SDG – Marion Butts – 10 rushes, 36 yards

**Top receivers**

- RAI – James Jett – 7 receptions, 138 yards
- SDG – Anthony Miller – 4 receptions, 53 yards

Los Angeles dominated several key statistics, even if the final score was close. The Raiders had more yards (428 to 154) plays (81 to 42) and time of possession (41:48 to 18:12). The tone was set by the opening drive of the game, as LA went 86 yards in 19 plays, taking 11:22 before stalling at the goal line and kicking a field goal. They had to settle for 3 points on three further red zone visits - a pair of turnovers also kept the score down.

For the Chargers, John Friesz struggled during his rare visits to the field, going 3 of 8 for 38 yards, and getting sacked twice. Stan Humphries came in at halftime, but saw a 44-yard completion to Shawn Jefferson wiped out by an offensive pass interference penalty, and couldn't breech the Raider red zone until late on in the game. After the fourth Raider field goal, Humphries threw six straight completions for 73 yards, the final nine coming on a touchdown to Nate Lewis. However, there was only 1:53 to play - the Raiders recovered an onside kick and only 14 seconds remained when San Diego got the ball back, whereupon Humphries was intercepted.

==== Week 13: at Indianapolis Colts ====
Week Thirteen: San Diego Chargers at Indianapolis Colts – Game summary

Quarter	1	2	3	4	Total
Chargers	0	14	3	14	**31**
Colts	0	0	0	0	**0**

at Hoosier Dome, Indianapolis, Indiana

- Date: November 29
- Game time: 9:00 p.m. EST
- Game weather: Played indoors (domed stadium)
- Game attendance: 54,110
- Referee: Ron Blum
- TV announcers (ABC): Al Michaels, Frank Gifford and Dan Dierdorf
- Box score

Game information

**First quarter**

- No scoring plays.

**Second quarter**

- SDG – Shawn Jefferson 39-yard pass from Stan Humphries (John Carney kick), 4:12. Chargers 7–0. **Drive: 9 plays, 97 yards, 5:00.**
- SDG – Nate Lewis 8-yard pass from Stan Humphries (John Carney kick), 0:34. Chargers 14–0. **Drive: 10 plays, 90 yards, 2:07.**

**Third quarter**

- SDG – John Carney 36-yard field goal, 3:33. Chargers 10–0. **Drive: 8 plays, 44 yards, 4:23.**

**Fourth quarter**

- SDG – Marion Butts 1-yard run (John Carney kick), 14:58. Chargers 23–17. **Drive: 3 plays, 8 yards, 1:12.**
- SDG – Eric Bieniemy 4-yard run (John Carney kick), 9:31. Chargers 23–17. **Drive: 7 plays, 53 yards, 3:50.**

**Top passers**

- SDG – Stan Humphries – 16/25, 216 yards, 2 TD
- IND – Jeff George – 17/28, 209 yards, TD, INT

**Top rushers**

- SDG – Marion Butts – 13 rushes, 80 yards, TD
- IND – Roosevelt Potts – 9 rushes, 34 yards

**Top receivers**

- SDG – Anthony Miller – 4 receptions, 65 yards
- IND – Jessie Hester – 8 receptions, 95 yards

The Charger defense had three takeaways while imposing a Monday Night shutout. Indianapolis drove to a first down at the Charger 26 on the game's first possession, but Stanley Richard intercepted an underthrown HB option pass, and there were few threats thereafter.

Stan Humphries had a successful return to the starting lineup, going 16 of 25 for 216 yards, and 2nd quarter touchdowns to Jefferson and Lewis. In the second half, Chris Mims and Junior Seau recovered a pair of fumbles, which San Diego turned into rushing touchdowns by Butts and Eric Bieniemy. In total, the Chargers rolled up 247 yards on the ground.

It was the second consecutive season in which San Diego shut out the Colts.

==== Week 14: vs. Denver Broncos ====
Week Fourteen: Denver Broncos at San Diego Chargers – Game summary

Quarter	1	2	3	4	Total
Broncos	3	7	0	0	**10**
Chargers	0	0	3	10	**13**

at Jack Murphy Stadium, San Diego, California

- Date: December 5
- Game time: 1:00 p.m. PST
- Game weather: 57 °F (13.9 °C), relative humidity 74%, wind 6 miles per hour (9.7 km/h; 5.2 kn)
- Game attendance: 60,233
- Referee: Dale Hamer
- TV announcers (NBC): Dick Enberg and Bob Trumpy
- Box score

Game information

**First quarter**

- DEN – Jason Elam 30-yard field goal, 6:32. Broncos 3–0. **Drive: 14 plays, 86 yards, 5:39.**

**Second quarter**

- DEN – David Wyman 1-yard pass from Tommy Maddox (Jason Elam kick), 1:49. Broncos 10–0. **Drive: 9 plays, 71 yards, 4:24.**

**Third quarter**

- SDG – John Carney 27-yard field goal, 10:03. Broncos 10–3. **Drive: 9 plays, 29 yards, 4:36.**

**Fourth quarter**

- SDG – Natrone Means 1-yard run (John Carney kick), 11:32. Tied 10–10. **Drive: 11 plays, 55 yards, 4:43.**
- SDG – John Carney 34-yard field goal, 0:03. Chargers 13–10. **Drive: 12 plays, 80 yards, 2:51.**

**Top passers**

- DEN – John Elway – 14/32, 171 yards, INT
- SDG – Stan Humphries – 22/39, 221 yards

**Top rushers**

- DEN – Rod Bernstine – 15 rushes, 52 yards
- SDG – Marion Butts – 11 rushes, 58 yards

**Top receivers**

- DEN – Arthur Marshall – 3 receptions, 44 yards
- SDG – Nate Lewis – 6 receptions, 60 yards

John Carney kicked the winner, as both he and the Chargers overcame their early errors. In the first half, Carney missed two long field goals, and a Nate Lewis touchdown was negated by a penalty. San Diego were also fooled by a fake field goal, and it was 10-0 Denver at the break.

Darren Carrington intercepted John Elway on the first play of the second half, and the tide began to turn, the turnover leading to a successful field goal, before Means tied the scores early in the 4th quarter. After Denver missed a field goal and both team punted, the Chargers began their final possession on their own 5 yard line. Following an eight-yard run by Means, Humphries threw on 10 consecutive plays, completing 7 passes for 72 yards. Carney's decisive kick came from 34 yards out with 3 seconds left.

==== Week 15: vs. Green Bay Packers ====
Week Fifteen: Green Bay Packers at San Diego Chargers – Game summary

Quarter	1	2	3	4	Total
Packers	7	6	7	0	**20**
Chargers	3	3	7	0	**13**

at Jack Murphy Stadium, San Diego, California

- Date: December 12
- Game time: 5:00 p.m. PST
- Game weather: 56 °F (13.3 °C), relative humidity 78%, wind 12 miles per hour (19 km/h; 10 kn)
- Game attendance: 57,930
- Referee: Howard Roe
- TV announcers (ESPN): Mike Patrick and Joe Theismann
- Box score

Game information

**First quarter**

- GB – Edgar Bennett 3-yard run (Chris Jacke kick), 9:10. Packers 7–0. **Drive: 7 plays, 66 yards, 4:00.**
- SDG – John Carney 47-yard field goal, 1:54. Packers 7–3. **Drive: 8 plays, 31 yards, 3:27.**

**Second quarter**

- GB – Chris Jacke 51-yard field goal, 9:12. Packers 10–3. **Drive: 6 plays, 15 yards, 2:57.**
- GB – Chris Jacke 42-yard field goal, 6:26. Packers 13–3. **Drive: 5 plays, 17 yards, 1:43.**
- SDG – John Carney 43-yard field goal, 0:04. Broncos 13–6. **Drive: 8 plays, 23 yards, 1:23.**

**Third quarter**

- GB – Darrell Thompson 5-yard run (Chris Jacke kick), 4:19. Packers 20–6. **Drive: 12 plays, 55 yards, 6:28.**
- SDG – Nate Lewis 10-yard pass from Stan Humphries (John Carney kick), 0:39. Packers 20–13. **Drive: 9 plays, 51 yards, 3:40.**

**Fourth quarter**

- No scoring plays.

**Top passers**

- GB – Brett Favre – 13/23, 146 yards, INT
- SDG – Stan Humphries – 27/51, 257 yards, TD, 3 INT

**Top rushers**

- GB – Edgar Bennett – 18 rushes, 59 yards, TD
- SDG – Marion Butts – 9 rushes, 30 yards

**Top receivers**

- GB – Sterling Sharpe – 7 receptions, 65 yards
- SDG – Anthony Miller – 8 receptions, 103 yards

San Diego's playoff chances took a knock, as Green Bay edged a hard-fought encounter. The Packers took an early 7–0 lead, after which both sides kicked two field goals, and Brett Favre and Stan Humphries were intercepted on consecutive plays - it was 13–6 at the break.

Early in the 3rd quarter, Humphries led his team to a 4th and 4 at the Green Bay 34. They opted to go for it, but Humphries was sacked, and the Packers soon doubled their lead. A Nate Lewis reception soon had San Diego back in the game, after which they crossed midfield twice more, but could produce no further points. Means was stopped for a loss on 4th and 1 from the 37, and Humphries threw an interception on 2nd and 9 from the 43 with 2:29 on the clock.

In total, Humphries completed 27 of a career-high 51 attempts, for 257 yards, 1 touchdown and 3 interceptions. Anthony Millar had 8 catches for 103 yards.

==== Week 16: at Kansas City Chiefs ====
Week Sixteen: San Diego Chargers at Kansas City Chiefs – Game summary

Quarter	1	2	3	4	Total
Chargers	10	7	0	7	**24**
Chiefs	0	14	7	7	**28**

at Arrowhead Stadium, Kansas City, Missouri

- Date: December 19
- Game time: 3:00 p.m. CST
- Game weather: 34 °F (1.1 °C), relative humidity 80%, wind 8 miles per hour (13 km/h; 7.0 kn), wind chill 27 °F (−2.8 °C)
- Game attendance: 74,778
- Referee: Bob McElwee
- TV announcers (NBC): Charlie Jones and Todd Christensen
- Box score

Game information

**First quarter**

- SDG – Ronnie Harmon 28-yard pass from Stan Humphries (John Carney kick), 13:25. Chargers 7–0. **Drive: 3 plays, 30 yards, 1:14.**
- SDG – John Carney 38-yard field goal, 11:13. Chargers 10–0. **Drive: 4 plays, 6 yards, 1:49.**

**Second quarter**

- SDG – Duane Young 3-yard pass from John Friesz (John Carney kick), 14:57. Chargers 17–0. **Drive: 9 plays, 60 yards, 3:58.**
- KAN – Marcus Allen 1-yard run (Nick Lowery kick), 7:32. Chargers 17–7. **Drive: 14 plays, 77 yards, 7:25.**
- KAN – Willie Davis 9-yard pass from Joe Montana (Nick Lowery kick), 2:10. Chargers 17–14. **Drive: 8 plays, 66 yards, 3:43.**

**Third quarter**

- KAN – J. J. Birden 4-yard pass from Joe Montana (Nick Lowery kick), 4:39. Chiefs 21–17. **Drive: 5 plays, 20 yards, 1:34.**

**Fourth quarter**

- KAN – Willie Davis 28-yard pass from Dave Krieg (Nick Lowery kick), 12:54. Chiefs 28–17. **Drive: 6 plays, 60 yards, 2:56.**
- SDG – Natrone Means 2-yard run (John Carney kick), 5:27. Chiefs 28–24. **Drive: 6 plays, 32 yards, 2:56.**

**Top passers**

- SDG – John Friesz – 19/38, 161 yards, TD, 2 INT
- KAN – Joe Montana – 18/32, 168 yards, 2 TD, INT

**Top rushers**

- SDG – Marion Butts – 15 rushes, 61 yards
- KAN – Todd McNair – 8 rushes, 42 yards

**Top receivers**

- SDG – Anthony Miller – 5 receptions, 67 yards
- KAN – Willie Davis – 4 receptions, 84 yards, 2 TD

The Chargers were officially eliminated from playoff contention, after losing a topsy-turvy struggle. They a dream start, Donald Frank intercepting Joe Montana on the very first play from scrimmage, and Stan Humphries throwing a 28-yard touchdown to Ronnie Harmon three plays later. Humphries was knocked out of the game with a concussion, but the big plays kept coming, Plummer forcing a fumble which Mims recovered, setting up a Carney field goal. When blocking tight end Duane Young caught his first career touchdown pass from Friesz, it was 17–0 three seconds into the 2nd quarter.

The Chiefs responded quickly, scoring 14 points on their next two drives, and turning a Gordon fumble and Friesz interception into 14 more after half time. The tide then turned San Diego's way, with consecutive drives into the red zone - they turned the ball over on downs the first time, but quickly forced a punt and scored through Means.

The final Charger drive began on their own 28 with 2:07 to play. Friesz completed four consecutive passes to reach a first down at the Kansas City 32, but threw straight at Albert Lewis on the next play for a game-sealing interception.

==== Week 17: vs. Miami Dolphins ====
Week Seventeen: Miami Dolphins at San Diego Chargers – Game summary

Quarter	1	2	3	4	Total
Dolphins	3	10	7	0	**20**
Chargers	10	14	14	7	**45**

at Jack Murphy Stadium, San Diego, California

- Date: December 27
- Game time: 6:00 p.m. PST
- Game weather: 60 °F (15.6 °C), relative humidity 50%, wind 7 mph
- Game attendance: 60,311
- Referee: Dick Hantak
- TV announcers (ABC): Al Michaels, Frank Gifford and Dan Dierdorf
- Box score

Game information

**First quarter**

- SDG – John Carney 20-yard field goal, 10:25. Chargers 3–0. **Drive: 7 plays, 3 yards, 2:40.**
- MIA – Pete Stoyanovich 31-yard field goal, 5:56. Tied 3–3. **Drive: 9 plays, 34 yards, 4:29.**
- SDG – Natrone Means 1-yard run (John Carney kick), 1:23. Chargers 10–3. **Drive: 9 plays, 76 yards, 4:33.**

**Second quarter**

- MIA – Pete Stoyanovich 50-yard field goal, 12:56. Chargers 10–6. **Drive: 11 plays, 53 yards, 3:27.**
- SDG – Natrone Means 65-yard run (John Carney kick), 12:41. Chargers 17–6. **Drive: 1 play, 65 yards, 0:15.**
- MIA – Keith Byars 1-yard run (Pete Stoyanovich kick), 6:217. Chargers 17–13. **Drive: 11 plays, 74 yards, 6:24.**
- SDG – Anthony Miller 41-yard pass from Stan Humphries (John Carney kick), 0:00. Chargers 24–13. **Drive: 3 plays, 53 yards, 0:12.**

**Third quarter**

- SDG – Ronnie Harmon 21-yard pass from Stan Humphries (John Carney kick), 13:39. Chargers 31–13. **Drive: 3 plays, 57 yards, 1:21.**
- SDG – Anthony Miller 14-yard pass from Stan Humphries (John Carney kick), 6:20. Chargers 38–13. **Drive: 12 plays, 78 yards, 5:08.**
- MIA – Keith Byars 13-yard pass from Scott Mitchell (Pete Stoyanovich kick), 3:17. Chargers 38–20. **Drive: 10 plays, 81 yards, 3:03.**

**Fourth quarter**

- SDG – Natrone Means 2-yard run (John Carney kick), 10:59. Chargers 45–20. **Drive: 15 plays, 65 yards, 7:18.**

**Top passers**

- MIA – Scott Mitchell – 24/40, 260 yards, TD, 3 INT
- SDG – Stan Humphries – 19/29, 248 yards, 3 TD

**Top rushers**

- MIA – Terry Kirby – 10 rushes, 25 yards
- SDG – Natrone Means – 18 rushes, 118 yards, 3 TD

**Top receivers**

- MIA – Terry Kirby – 7 receptions, 74 yards
- SDG – Anthony Miller – 7 receptions, 110 yards, 2 TD

After scoring only six touchdowns in their previous seven home games, the Chargers exploded for six in a single night, routing the playoff-chasing Dolphins and avenging their recent playoff defeat. The biggest scoring plays came in the 2nd quarter. First, Natrone Means burst through the line and outran the secondary for a 65-yard touchdown, his second of the game. Then, with five seconds to play in the half, the Chargers reached the Dolphin 41 with five seconds to play in the half. Humphries lofted a Hail Mary that was deflected in the air and grabbed by Anthony Miller just before he stepped out of the end zone. Harmon, Miller and Means added further scores in a processional second half.

Humphries finished 19 of 29 for 248 yards, three touchdowns and no interceptions, a QB rating of 126.8. Miller had 7 catches for 110 yards and two touchdowns; Means carried 18 times for 118 yards and scored three times. On defense, Darren Carrington had two interceptions while Donald Frank added a third.

==== Week 18: at Tampa Bay Buccaneers ====
Week Eighteen: San Diego Chargers at Tampa Bay Buccaneers – Game summary

Quarter	1	2	3	4	Total
Chargers	10	3	3	16	**32**
Buccaneers	0	3	7	7	**17**

at Tampa Stadium, Tampa, Florida

- Date: January 2
- Game time: 4:00 p.m. EST
- Game weather: 68 °F (20.0 °C), relative humidity 90%, wind 9 mph
- Game attendance: 35,587
- Referee: Gary Lane
- TV announcers (NBC): Drew Goodman and Bob Trumpy
- Box score

Game information

**First quarter**

- SDG – John Carney 48-yard field goal, 10:49. Chargers 3–0. **Drive: 9 plays, 51 yards, 4:11.**
- SDG – Anthony Miller 48-yard pass from Stan Humphries (John Carney kick), 5:47. Chargers 10–0. **Drive: 6 plays, 68 yards, 2:57.**

**Second quarter**

- TB – Michael Husted 21-yard field goal, 10:14. Chargers 10–3. **Drive: 19 plays, 84 yards, 10:33.**
- SDG – John Carney 38-yard field goal, 1:16. Chargers 13–3. **Drive: 4 plays, -3 yards, 0:29.**

**Third quarter**

- TB – Lamar Thomas 20-yard pass from Craig Erickson (Michael Husted kick), 5:45. Chargers 13–10. **Drive: 5 plays, 64 yards, 2:12.**
- SDG – John Carney 43-yard field goal, 0:52. Chargers 16–10. **Drive: 10 plays, 55 yards, 4:53.**

**Fourth quarter**

- TB – Courtney Hawkins 42-yard pass from Craig Erickson (Michael Husted kick), 8:26. Buccaneers 17–16. **Drive: 6 plays, 68 yards, 2:35.**
- SDG – John Carney 45-yard field goal, 6:17. Chargers 19–17. **Drive: 5 plays, 52 yards, 2:09.**
- SDG – Duane Young 12-yard pass from Stan Humphries (kick failed), 2:35. Chargers 25–17. **Drive: 5 plays, 35 yards, 1:59.**
- SDG – Natrone Means 15-yard run (John Carney kick), 1:51. Chargers 32–17. **Drive: 2 plays, 17 yards, 0:25.**

**Top passers**

- SDG – Stan Humphries – 18/30, 272 yards, 2 TD
- TB – Craig Erickson – 21/41, 272 yards, 2 TD, 3 INT

**Top rushers**

- SDG – Marion Butts – 13 rushes, 52 yards
- TB – Reggie Cobb – 21 rushes, 67 yards

**Top receivers**

- SDG – Anthony Miller – 7 receptions, 119 yards, TD
- TB – Horace Copeland – 7 receptions, 101 yards

A strong finish saw the Chargers level their record at 8–8. A 48-yard Anthony Miller touchdown opened the scoring, and the Chargers led 13–3 at halftime. After San Diego botched a fake field, the game turned Tampa Bay's way, and they led 17–16 with 8:26 to play. John Carney's fourth field goal of the game restored the Chargers lead, before they converted a pair of interceptions into touchdowns by Duane Young and Natrone Means.

Humphries had another strong showing: 18 of 30, for 272 yards, 2 touchdowns and no interceptions. Anthony Miller caught 7 passes for 119 yards and his 40th and final touchdown as a Charger.

== Standings ==
AFC West
	W	L	T	PCT	PF	PA	STK
^{(3)} Kansas City Chiefs	11	5	0	.688	328	291	W1
^{(4)} Los Angeles Raiders	10	6	0	.625	306	326	W1
^{(5)} Denver Broncos	9	7	0	.563	373	284	L2
San Diego Chargers	8	8	0	.500	322	290	W2
Seattle Seahawks	6	10	0	.375	280	314	L1

== Awards ==
Three Chargers were named to the AFC Pro Bowl squad, with Seau and Miller as starters and O'Neal a backup. Seau was also named a first-team All-Pro by the Associated Press.
