= 1993 Kansas City Chiefs season =

NFL team season

- Owner: Lamar Hunt
- General manager: Carl Peterson
- Head coach: Marty Schottenheimer
- Offensive coordinator: Paul Hackett
- Defensive coordinator: Dave Adolph
- Home stadium: Arrowhead Stadium

Results
- Record: 11–5
- Division place: 1st AFC West
- Playoffs: Won Wild Card Playoffs (vs. Steelers) 27–24 (OT); Won Divisional Playoffs (at Oilers) 28–20; Lost AFC Championship (at Bills) 13–30
- All-Pros: 2: DE Neil Smith (1st team); LB Derrick Thomas (2nd team)
- Pro Bowlers: 5: QB Joe Montana; RB Marcus Allen; T John Alt; DE Neil Smith; LB Derrick Thomas

The 1993 Kansas City Chiefs season was the franchise's 24th season in the National Football League and the 34th overall. They improved on their 10–6 record from 1992 and won the AFC West and with an 11–5 record. Kansas City advanced all the way to the AFC Championship before losing to the Buffalo Bills 30–13, which started the Chiefs' 8-game playoff losing streak. It would be 22 years before the Chiefs would win another playoff game, and 25 years until they won another playoff game at Arrowhead.

The season marked the first for new quarterback Joe Montana, who was acquired through a trade with the San Francisco 49ers and running back Marcus Allen from the Los Angeles Raiders, both winners of five Super Bowl championships combined. This would be the last time until 2018 that the Chiefs would appear in the AFC Championship game or win a playoff game at Arrowhead.

== Offseason ==
Additions	Subtractions
QB Joe Montana (49ers)	CB J. C. Pearson (Vikings)
RB Marcus Allen (Raiders)	RB Barry Word (Vikings)
T Reggie McElroy (Raiders)	LB Dino Hackett (Seahawks)
S Jay Taylor (Cardinals)	DT Bill Maas (Packers)
	G Dave Lutz (Lions)
	LB Chris Martin (Rams)

=== Montana and Marcus ===
In the months preceding the 1993 season, Kansas City acquired two former Super Bowl MVPs: Joe Montana from the San Francisco 49ers, and Marcus Allen from the Los Angeles Raiders.

The previous season, the Chiefs' starting quarterback was Dave Krieg and their running back was Christian Okoye. Okoye suffered a knee injury prior to training camp in 1993, but keeping Krieg would prove to be a wise decision in the event of injury to the new starter Montana.

Allen was named NFL Comeback Player of the Year in 1993 after rushing for twelve touchdowns and 764 yards.

=== Draft ===
With their first pick in the 1993 NFL draft, coming in the third round, the Chiefs' selected future all-pro and Hall of fame guard Will Shields out of the University of Nebraska. Shields went on to start 223 of the 224 career games he played for the team and was selected to 12 consecutive Pro Bowls.

1993 Kansas City Chiefs draft
Round	Pick	Player	Position	College	Notes
3	74	Will Shields * ^{†}	Guard	Nebraska	
4	103	Jaime Fields	Linebacker	Washington	
5	130	Lindsay Knapp	Guard	Notre Dame	
6	159	Darius Turner	Running back	Washington	
7	186	Danan Hughes	Wide receiver	Iowa	
Made roster † Pro Football Hall of Fame * Made at least one Pro Bowl during career

=== Undrafted free agents ===
1993 undrafted free agents of note
Player	Position	College
Mike Bartrum	Tight end	Marshall
Wes Bender	Running back	USC
Trevor Cobb	Running back	Rice
Ron Dickerson	Wide receiver	Arkansas
Matt Gay	Wide receiver	Kansas
Chip Hilleary	Quarterback	Kansas
Jeff Jones	Wide receiver	California
Morris Lolar	Cornerback	Friends

== Personnel ==
=== Staff ===
1993 Kansas City Chiefs staff
Front office: Founder – Lamar Hunt; Chairman of the board – Jack Steadman; President/general manager/Chief Executive Officer – Carl Peterson; Assistant general manager – Dennis Thum; Vice-president of player personnel – Lynn Stiles; Director of pro personnel – Mark Hatley; Director of college scouting – Terry Bradway; Head coaches: Head coach – Marty Schottenheimer; Assistant head coach/wide receivers – Al Saunders; Offensive coaches: Offensive coordinator/quarterbacks – Paul Hackett; Running backs – Jimmy Raye; Tight ends – Kurt Schottenheimer; Offensive line – Alex Gibbs; Offensive Assistant/quality control – Mike McCarthy	Defensive coaches: Defensive coordinator/linebackers – Dave Adolph; Defensive line – Tom Pratt; Defensive backs – Herman Edwards; Defensive assistant – John Bunting; Defensive assistant/quality control – Darvin Wallis; Special teams coaches: Special teams – Kurt Schottenheimer; Strength and conditioning: Strength and conditioning – Dave Redding; Assistant strength and conditioning – Russ Ball

=== Roster ===
1993 Kansas City Chiefs roster
Quarterbacks (QB): 14 Matt Blundin; 17 Dave Krieg; 19 Joe Montana; Running backs (RB): 32 Marcus Allen; 38 Kimble Anders; 48 Todd McNair; 21 John Stephens; 45 Ernie Thompson FB; 44 Harvey Williams; Wide receivers (WR): 82 Tim Barnett; 88 J. J. Birden; 84 Willie Davis; 83 Danan Hughes; 80 Fred Jones; Tight ends (TE): 87 Mike Bartrum; 89 Keith Cash; 85 Jonathan Hayes	Offensive linemen (OL): 76 John Alt T; 74 Derrick Graham T; 61 Tim Grunhard C; 65 Lindsay Knapp G; 70 Reggie McElroy G/T; 68 Will Shields G; 66 Ricky Siglar T; 79 Dave Szott G; 73 Joe Valerio; 72 Danny Villa; Defensive linemen (DL): 77 Pellom McDaniels DE; 92 Darren Mickell DE; 96 Tim Newton NT; 75 Joe Phillips NT; 97 Dan Saleaumua DE; 90 Neil Smith DE	Linebackers (LB): 50 Erick Anderson OLB; 59 Jaime Fields ILB; 51 Lonnie Marts ILB; 52 Tracy Rogers OLB; 54 Tracy Simien ILB; 53 Santo Stephens OLB; 58 Derrick Thomas OLB; Defensive backs (DB): 30 Martin Bayless SS; 34 Dale Carter CB; 29 Albert Lewis CB; 24 Erik McMillan FS; 42 Charles Mincy S; 38 Bruce Pickens CB; 31 Kevin Ross CB/FS; 27 Jay Taylor CB; 46 Bennie Thompson SS; 26 Tim Watson FS; 40 Robert Williams CB; Special teams (ST): 4 Bryan Barker P; 8 Nick Lowery K	Practice squad: 6 Allen DeGraffenreid WR; 5 Matt Gay WR; -- Troy Ridgley DT; 55 Pete Shufelt LB; Reserve: 22 Trevor Cobb RB (IR); 23 Ron Dickerson RB (IR); 25 Doug Terry S (IR); 41 David Whitmore S (IR); 53 active, 4 inactive, 4 practice squad Rookies in italics

== Preseason ==
Week	Date	Opponent	Result	Record	Venue	Attendance	Recap
1	August 7	at Green Bay Packers	W 29–21	1–0	Milwaukee County Stadium	51,655	Recap
2	August 12	Buffalo Bills	L 7–30	1–1	Arrowhead Stadium	73,550	Recap
3	August 21	Minnesota Vikings	W 27–20	2–1	Arrowhead Stadium	73,080	Recap
4	August 27	at New England Patriots	W 27–20	3–1	Foxboro Stadium	46,501	Recap

== Regular season ==
=== Schedule ===
Week	Date	Opponent	Result	Record	Venue	Attendance	Recap
1	September 5	at Tampa Bay Buccaneers	**W** 27–3	1–0	Tampa Stadium	63,378	Recap
2	September 12	at Houston Oilers	**L** 0–30	1–1	Houston Astrodome	59,780	Recap
3	September 20	**Denver Broncos**	**W** 15–7	2–1	Arrowhead Stadium	78,453	Recap
4	Bye						
5	October 3	**Los Angeles Raiders**	**W** 24–9	3–1	Arrowhead Stadium	77,395	Recap
6	October 10	Cincinnati Bengals	**W** 17–15	4–1	Arrowhead Stadium	78,493	Recap
7	October 17	at **San Diego Chargers**	**W** 17–14	5–1	Jack Murphy Stadium	60,729	Recap
8	Bye (Note: For the 1993 NFL season, all teams were scheduled two bye-weeks over the newly expanded 18-week schedule. This was the only time in NFL history that the season expanded to 18 weeks with 16 games. The format changed for the 1994 season.)						
9	October 31	at Miami Dolphins	**L** 10–30	5–2	Joe Robbie Stadium	67,765	Recap
10	November 8	Green Bay Packers	**W** 23–16	6–2	Arrowhead Stadium	76,742	Recap
11	November 14	at **Los Angeles Raiders**	**W** 31–20	7–2	Los Angeles Memorial Coliseum	66,553	Recap
12	November 21	Chicago Bears	**L** 17–19	7–3	Arrowhead Stadium	76,872	Recap
13	November 28	Buffalo Bills	**W** 23–7	8–3	Arrowhead Stadium	74,452	Recap
14	December 5	at **Seattle Seahawks**	**W** 31–16	9–3	Kingdome	58,551	Recap
15	December 12	at **Denver Broncos**	**L** 21–27	9–4	Mile High Stadium	75,822	Recap
16	December 19	**San Diego Chargers**	**W** 28–24	10–4	Arrowhead Stadium	74,778	Recap
17	December 26	at Minnesota Vikings	**L** 10–30	10–5	Hubert H. Humphrey Metrodome	59,236	Recap
18	January 2	**Seattle Seahawks**	**W** 34–24	11–5	Arrowhead Stadium	72,136	Recap
Note: Intra-division opponents are in **bold** text.

=== Game summaries ===
==== Week 1: at Tampa Bay Buccaneers ====
Week 1: Kansas City Chiefs at Tampa Bay Buccaneers – Game summary

Quarter	1	2	3	4	Total
**Chiefs**	0	17	7	3	**27**
Buccaneers	3	0	0	0	**3**

at Tampa Stadium, Tampa, Florida

- Date: September 5
- Game time: 1:00 p.m. EDT/12:00 p.m. CDT
- Game weather: Partly cloudy, 90 °F (32 °C)
- Game attendance: 63,378
- Referee: Dale Hamer
- TV announcers (NBC): Marv Albert, Paul Maguire and John Dockery
- Recap, Game Book

Game information

**First quarter**

- TB – Michael Husted 35-yard field goal, 1:56. Buccaneers 3–0. **Drive: 6 plays, 20 yards, 2:33.**

**Second quarter**

- KC – Willie Davis 19-yard pass from Joe Montana (Nick Lowery kick), 14:21. Chiefs 7–3. **Drive: 6 plays, 83 yards, 3:25.**
- KC – Nick Lowery 20-yard field goal, 7:03. Chiefs 10–3. **Drive: 8 plays, 67 yards, 3:04.**
- KC – J. J. Birden 50-yard pass from Joe Montana (Nick Lowery kick), 4:20. Chiefs 17–3. **Drive: 3 plays, 54 yards, 0:57.**

**Third quarter**

- KC – Marcus Allen 12-yard pass from Joe Montana (Nick Lowery kick), 5:08. Chiefs 24–3. **Drive: 8 plays, 68 yards, 3:45.**

**Fourth quarter**

- KC – Nick Lowery 23-yard field goal, 9:38. Chiefs 27–3. **Drive: 11 plays, 60 yards, 6:21.**

**Top passers**

- KC – Joe Montana – 14/21, 246 yards, 3 TD
- TB – Steve DeBerg – 12/20, 79 yards, INT

**Top rushers**

- KC – Marcus Allen – 13 rushes, 79 yards
- TB – Reggie Cobb – 17 rushes, 28 yards

**Top receivers**

- KC – J. J. Birden – 3 receptions, 82 yards, TD
- TB – Courtney Hawkins – 6 receptions, 53 yards

==== Week 2: at Houston Oilers ====
Week 2: Kansas City Chiefs at Houston Oilers – Game summary

Quarter	1	2	3	4	Total
Chiefs	0	0	0	0	**0**
**Oilers**	0	7	6	17	**30**

at Astrodome, Houston, Texas

- Date: September 12
- Game time: 12:00 p.m. CDT
- Game weather: None (indoor stadium)
- Game attendance: 59,780
- Referee: Howard Roe
- TV announcers (NBC): Marv Albert and Paul Maguire
- Recap, Game Book

Game information

**First quarter**

- No scoring plays.

**Second quarter**

- HOU – Curtis Duncan 2-yard pass from Warren Moon (Al Del Greco kick), 13:53. Oilers 7–0. **Drive: 18 plays, 80 yards, 11:40.**

**Third quarter**

- HOU – Al Del Greco 25-yard field goal, 9:52. Oilers 10–0. **Drive: 10 plays, 72 yards, 5:08.**
- HOU – Al Del Greco 22-yard field goal, 1:28. Oilers 13–0. **Drive: 4 plays, 5 yards, 0:53.**

**Fourth quarter**

- HOU – Al Del Greco 50-yard field goal, 7:00. Oilers 16–0. **Drive: 9 plays, 44 yards, 5:29.**
- HOU – Cris Dishman 58-yard fumble return (Al Del Greco kick), 5:34. Oilers 23–0.
- HOU – Lorenzo White 1-yard run (Al Del Greco kick), 2:40. Oilers 30–0. **Drive: 5 plays, 20 yards, 2:34.**

**Top passers**

- KC – Dave Krieg – 15/27, 175 yards, 2 INT
- HOU – Warren Moon – 22/35, 204 yards, TD, INT

**Top rushers**

- KC – Marcus Allen – 6 rushes, 17 yards
- HOU – Lorenzo White – 24 rushes, 48 yards, TD

**Top receivers**

- KC – Willie Davis – 3 receptions, 67 yards
- HOU – Webster Slaughter – 6 receptions, 74 yards

==== Week 3: vs. Denver Broncos ====
Week 3: Denver Broncos at Kansas City Chiefs – Game summary

Quarter	1	2	3	4	Total
Broncos	0	0	0	7	**7**
**Chiefs**	6	6	0	3	**15**

at Arrowhead Stadium, Kansas City, Missouri

- Date: September 20
- Game time: 8:00 p.m. CDT
- Game weather: Clear, 74 °F (23 °C)
- Game attendance: 78,453
- Referee: Gordon McCarter
- TV announcers (ABC): Al Michaels, Frank Gifford and Dan Dierdorf
- Recap, Game Book

Game information

**First quarter**

- KC – Nick Lowery 34-yard field goal, 12:24. Chiefs 3–0. **Drive: 6 plays, 32 yards, 2:36.**
- KC – Nick Lowery 41-yard field goal, 2:37. Chiefs 6–0. **Drive: 11 plays, 74 yards, 5:45.**

**Second quarter**

- KC – Nick Lowery 52-yard field goal, 8:56. Chiefs 9–0. **Drive: 10 plays, 53 yards, 5:50.**
- KC – Nick Lowery 44-yard field goal, 4:07. Chiefs 12–0. **Drive: 7 plays, 43 yards, 3:12.**

**Third quarter**

- No scoring plays.

**Fourth quarter**

- KC – Nick Lowery 20-yard field goal, 9:21. Chiefs 15–0. **Drive: 12 plays, 84 yards, 6:51.**
- DEN – Vance Johnson 2-yard pass from John Elway (Jason Elam kick), 1:24. Chiefs 15–7. **Drive: 13 plays, 91 yards, 3:23.**

**Top passers**

- DEN – John Elway – 28/45, 300 yards, TD, INT
- KC – Joe Montana – 21/36, 273 yards

**Top rushers**

- DEN – Robert Delpino – 3 rushes, 15 yards
- KC – Marcus Allen – 17 rushes, 91 yards

**Top receivers**

- DEN – Derek Russell – 6 receptions, 104 yards
- KC – Willie Davis – 6 receptions, 139 yards

==== Week 5: vs. Los Angeles Raiders ====
Week 5: Los Angeles Raiders at Kansas City Chiefs – Game summary

Quarter	1	2	3	4	Total
Raiders	0	3	0	6	**9**
**Chiefs**	14	7	3	0	**24**

at Arrowhead Stadium, Kansas City, Missouri

- Date: October 3
- Game time: 12:00 p.m. CDT
- Game weather: Clear, 67 °F (19 °C)
- Game attendance: 77,395
- Referee: Bob McElwee
- TV announcers (NBC): Marv Albert, Paul Maguire and O. J. Simpson
- Recap, Game Book

Game information

**First quarter**

- KC – Joe Valerio 1-yard pass from Joe Montana (Nick Lowery kick), 5:53. Chiefs 7–0. **Drive: 9 plays, 61 yards, 4:40.**
- KC – Willie Davis 15-yard pass from Joe Montana (Nick Lowery kick), 1:01. Chiefs 14–0. **Drive: 8 plays, 68 yards, 3:42.**

**Second quarter**

- RAI – Jeff Jaeger 27-yard field goal, 11:08. Chiefs 14–3. **Drive: 10 plays, 70 yards, 4:53.**
- KC – Marcus Allen 4-yard run (Nick Lowery kick), 6:30. Chiefs 21–3. **Drive: 10 plays, 53 yards, 4:38.**

**Third quarter**

- KC – Nick Lowery 29-yard field goal, 8:14. Chiefs 24–3. **Drive: 10 plays, 69 yards, 6:46.**

**Fourth quarter**

- RAI – Raghib Ismail 43-yard pass from Vince Evans (kick blocked), 6:12. Chiefs 24–9. **Drive: 6 plays, 83 yards, 1:38.**

**Top passers**

- RAI – Vince Evans – 15/26, 192 yards, TD
- KC – Dave Krieg – 5/9, 77 yards

**Top rushers**

- RAI – Greg Robinson – 10 rushes, 29 yards
- KC – Harvey Williams – 13 rushes, 56 yards

**Top receivers**

- RAI – Raghib Ismail – 4 receptions, 75 yards, TD
- KC – Mike Dyal – 1 reception, 31 yards

==== Week 6: vs. Cincinnati Bengals ====
Week 6: Cincinnati Bengals at Kansas City Chiefs – Game summary

Quarter	1	2	3	4	Total
Bengals	3	9	0	3	**15**
**Chiefs**	0	7	7	3	**17**

at Arrowhead Stadium, Kansas City, Missouri

- Date: October 10
- Game time: 12:00 p.m. CDT
- Game weather: Clear, 49 °F (9 °C)
- Game attendance: 75,493
- Referee: Bernie Kukar
- TV announcers (NBC): Charlie Jones and Todd Christensen
- Recap, Game Book

Game information

**First quarter**

- CIN – Doug Pelfrey 23-yard field goal, 5:36. Bengals 3–0. **Drive: 14 plays, 70 yards, 6:24.**

**Second quarter**

- CIN – Doug Pelfrey 24-yard field goal, 13:08. Bengals 6–0. **Drive: 13 plays, 84 yards, 6:18.**
- CIN – Doug Pelfrey 42-yard field goal, 8:34. Bengals 9–0. **Drive: 4 plays, 4 yards, 0:55.**
- KC – Tim Barnett 8-yard pass from Dave Krieg (Nick Lowery kick), 4:49. Bengals 9–7. **Drive: 7 plays, 63 yards, 3:45.**
- CIN – Doug Pelfrey 47-yard field goal, 0:01. Bengals 12–7. **Drive: 7 plays, 23 yards, 1:43.**

**Third quarter**

- KC – Marcus Allen 9-yard run (Nick Lowery kick), 6:26. Chiefs 14–12. **Drive: 6 plays, 51 yards, 2:58.**

**Fourth quarter**

- CIN – Doug Pelfrey 34-yard field goal, 5:59. Bengals 15–14. **Drive: 16 plays, 72 yards, 8:55.**
- KC – Nick Lowery 37-yard field goal, 2:43. Chiefs 17–15. **Drive: 7 plays, 48 yards, 3:16.**

**Top passers**

- CIN – David Klingler – 16/30, 173 yards, INT
- KC – Dave Krieg – 10/20, 140 yards, TD

**Top rushers**

- CIN – Harold Green – 22 rushes, 68 yards
- KC – Marcus Allen – 13 rushes, 48 yards, TD

**Top receivers**

- CIN – Jeff Query – 3 receptions, 69 yards
- KC – Kimble Anders – 4 receptions, 70 yards

==== Week 7: at San Diego Chargers ====
Week 7: Kansas City Chiefs at San Diego Chargers – Game summary

Quarter	1	2	3	4	Total
**Chiefs**	7	3	0	7	**17**
Chargers	0	7	0	7	**14**

at Jack Murphy Stadium, San Diego, California

- Date: October 17
- Game time: 3:00 p.m. CDT/1:00 p.m. PDT
- Game weather: Partly cloudy, 69 °F (21 °C)
- Game attendance: 60,729
- Referee: Jerry Markbreit
- TV announcers (NBC): Dick Enberg, Bob Trumpy and O.J. Simpson
- Recap, Game Book

Game information

**First quarter**

- KC – Marcus Allen 15-yard pass from Joe Montana (Nick Lowery kick), 4:25. Chiefs 7–0. **Drive: 4 plays, 64 yards, 1:12.**

**Second quarter**

- SD – Natrone Means 7-yard run (John Carney kick), 9:20. Tied 7–7. **Drive: 10 plays, 36 yards, 5:40.**
- KC – Nick Lowery 37-yard field goal, 0:00. Chiefs 10–7. **Drive: 7 plays, 35 yards, 1:34.**

**Third quarter**

- No scoring plays.

**Fourth quarter**

- SD – Anthony Miller 4-yard pass from John Friesz (John Carney kick), 13:55. Chargers 14–10. **Drive: 3 plays, 3 yards, 0:41.**
- KC – Marcus Allen 1-yard run (Nick Lowery kick), 1:57. Chiefs 17–14. **Drive: 9 plays, 80 yards, 1:30.**

**Top passers**

- KC – Joe Montana – 21/39, 284 yards, TD, INT
- SD – John Friesz – 18/35, 218 yards, TD, INT

**Top rushers**

- KC – Marcus Allen – 13 rushes, 46 yards, TD
- SD – Marion Butts – 11 rushes, 38 yards

**Top receivers**

- KC – Willie Davis – 4 receptions, 77 yards
- SD – Anthony Miller – 6 receptions, 105 yards, TD

==== Week 9: at Miami Dolphins ====
Week 9: Kansas City Chiefs at Miami Dolphins – Game summary

Quarter	1	2	3	4	Total
Chiefs	0	3	0	7	**10**
**Dolphins**	6	7	14	3	**30**

at Joe Robbie Stadium, Miami, Florida

- Date: October 31
- Game time: 1:00 p.m. EST/12:00 p.m. CST
- Game weather: Mostly cloudy, 73 °F (23 °C)
- Game attendance: 67,765
- Referee: Tom White
- TV announcers (NBC): Dick Enberg, Bob Trumpy and O.J. Simpson
- Recap, Game Book

Game information

**First quarter**

- MIA – Irving Fryar 27-yard pass from Scott Mitchell (pass failed), 7:05. Dolphins 6–0. **Drive: 6 plays, 35 yards, 1:36.**

**Second quarter**

- MIA – Keith Byars 8-yard pass from Scott Mitchell (Pete Stoyanovich kick), 14:55. Dolphins 13–0. **Drive: 9 plays, 80 yards, 4:09.**
- KC – Nick Lowery 47-yard field goal, 0:00. Dolphins 13–3. **Drive: 6 plays, 31 yards, 0:55.**

**Third quarter**

- MIA – Mark Ingram 77-yard pass from Scott Mitchell (Pete Stoyanovich kick), 14:32. Dolphins 20–3. **Drive: 2 plays, 77 yards, 0:28.**
- MIA – Terry Kirby 1-yard run (Pete Stoyanovich kick), 0:23. Dolphins 27–3. **Drive: 10 plays, 61 yards, 5:08.**

**Fourth quarter**

- MIA – Pete Stoyanovich 34-yard field goal, 7:41. Dolphins 30–3. **Drive: 11 plays, 48 yards, 6:29.**
- KC – Keith Cash 6-yard pass from Dave Krieg (Nick Lowery kick), 2:30. Dolphins 30–10. **Drive: 6 plays, 67 yards, 1:32.**

**Top passers**

- KC – Dave Krieg – 12/19, 126 yards, TD
- MIA – Scott Mitchell – 22/33, 344 yards, 3 TD

**Top rushers**

- KC – Todd McNair – 4 rushes, 44 yards
- MIA – Terry Kirby – 11 rushes, 46 yards, TD

**Top receivers**

- KC – J. J. Birden – 5 receptions, 65 yards
- MIA – Mark Ingram – 4 receptions, 103 yards, TD

==== Week 10: vs. Green Bay Packers ====
Week 10: Green Bay Packers at Kansas City Chiefs – Game summary

Quarter	1	2	3	4	Total
Packers	3	6	0	7	**16**
**Chiefs**	3	0	10	10	**23**

at Arrowhead Stadium, Kansas City, Missouri

- Date: November 8
- Game time: 8:00 p.m. CST
- Game weather: Overcast, 46 °F (8 °C)
- Game attendance: 76,742
- Referee: Red Cashion
- TV announcers (ABC): Al Michaels, Frank Gifford and Dan Dierdorf
- Recap, Game Book

Game information

**First quarter**

- KC – Nick Lowery 23-yard field goal, 9:42. Chiefs 3–0. **Drive: 6 plays, 17 yards, 2:49.**
- GB – Chris Jacke 23-yard field goal, 2:23. Tied 3–3. **Drive: 8 plays, 41 yards, 4:20.**

**Second quarter**

- GB – Chris Jacke 51-yard field goal, 12:01. Packers 6–3. **Drive: 6 plays, 21 yards, 2:45.**
- GB – Chris Jacke 19-yard field goal, 0:53. Packers 9–3. **Drive: 10 plays, 64 yards, 2:10.**

**Third quarter**

- KC – Dan Saleaumua 16-yard fumble return (Nick Lowery kick), 12:29. Chiefs 10–9.
- KC – Nick Lowery 34-yard field goal, 6:11. Chiefs 13–9. **Drive: 10 plays, 46 yards, 4:42.**

**Fourth quarter**

- KC – Marcus Allen 1-yard run (Nick Lowery kick), 13:54. Chiefs 20–9. **Drive: 7 plays, 76 yards, 2:13.**
- GB – Jackie Harris 35-yard pass from Brett Favre (Chris Jacke kick), 12:59. Chiefs 20–16. **Drive: 2 plays, 56 yards, 0:55.**
- KC – Nick Lowery 40-yard field goal, 3:26. Chiefs 23–16. **Drive: 7 plays, 58 yards, 2:31.**

**Top passers**

- GB – Brett Favre – 20/34, 213 yards, TD, 3 INT
- KC – Dave Krieg – 17/30, 170 yards

**Top rushers**

- GB – Darrell Thompson – 12 rushes, 51 yards
- KC – Todd McNair – 2 rushes, 54 yards

**Top receivers**

- GB – Jackie Harris – 6 receptions, 86 yards, TD
- KC – J. J. Birden – 5 receptions, 64 yards

==== Week 11: at Los Angeles Raiders ====
Week 11: Kansas City Chiefs at Los Angeles Raiders – Game summary

Quarter	1	2	3	4	Total
**Chiefs**	0	7	14	10	**31**
Raiders	7	10	0	3	**20**

at Los Angeles Memorial Coliseum, Los Angeles, California

- Date: November 14
- Game time: 3:00 p.m. CST/1:00 p.m. PST
- Game weather: Partly cloudy, 69 °F (21 °C)
- Game attendance: 66,553
- Referee: Ron Blum
- TV announcers (NBC): Dick Enberg, Bob Trumpy
- Recap, Game Book

Game information

**First quarter**

- RAI – Napoleon McCallum 4-yard run (Jeff Jaeger kick), 10:08. Raiders 7–0. **Drive: 6 plays, 57 yards, 3:07.**

**Second quarter**

- RAI – Ethan Horton 8-yard pass from Jeff Hostetler (Jeff Jaeger kick), 9:00. Raiders 14–0. **Drive: 5 plays, 33 yards, 2:21.**
- KC – Kimble Anders 15-yard pass from Dave Krieg (Nick Lowery kick), 2:01. Raiders 14–7. **Drive: 13 plays, 80 yards, 6:59.**
- RAI – Jeff Jaeger 35-yard field goal, 0:00. Raiders 17–7. **Drive: 8 plays, 63 yards, 2:01.**

**Third quarter**

- KC – Marcus Allen 4-yard run (Nick Lowery kick), 5:39. Raiders 17–14. **Drive: 6 plays, 65 yards, 3:21.**
- KC – Willie Davis 66-yard pass from Dave Krieg (Nick Lowery kick), 1:08. Chiefs 21–17. **Drive: 1 play, 66 yards, 0:11.**

**Fourth quarter**

- RAI – Jeff Jaeger 30-yard field goal, 10:15. Chiefs 21–20. **Drive: 8 plays, 68 yards, 3:42.**
- KC – Nick Lowery 29-yard field goal, 3:57. Chiefs 24–20. **Drive: 13 plays, 68 yards, 6:18.**
- KC – Keith Cash 4-yard pass from Dave Krieg (Nick Lowery kick), 2:52. Chiefs 31–20. **Drive: 2 plays, 10 yards, 0:50.**

**Top passers**

- KC – Dave Krieg – 12/27, 178 yards, 3 TD
- RAI – Jeff Hostetler – 16/35, 187 yards, TD, INT

**Top rushers**

- KC – Marcus Allen – 17 rushes, 85 yards, TD
- RAI – Greg Robinson – 17 rushes, 90 yards

**Top receivers**

- KC – Willie Davis – 5 receptions, 115 yards, TD
- RAI – Ethan Horton – 6 receptions, 69 yards, TD

==== Week 12: vs. Chicago Bears ====
Week 12: Chicago Bears at Kansas City Chiefs – Game summary

Quarter	1	2	3	4	Total
**Bears**	0	6	6	7	**19**
Chiefs	7	7	3	0	**17**

at Arrowhead Stadium, Kansas City, Missouri

- Date: November 21
- Game time: 12:00 p.m. CST
- Game weather: Clear, 52 °F (11 °C)
- Game attendance: 76,872
- Referee: Dick Hantak
- TV announcers (CBS): Verne Lundquist and Dan Fouts
- Recap, Game Book

Game information

**First quarter**

- KC – Marcus Allen 2-yard run (Nick Lowery kick), 4:25. Chiefs 7–0. **Drive: 7 plays, 58 yards, 3:47.**

**Second quarter**

- KC – Marcus Allen 8-yard run (Nick Lowery kick), 10:52. Chiefs 14–0. **Drive: 9 plays, 92 yards, 4:21.**
- CHI – Kevin Butler 32-yard field goal, 2:17. Chiefs 14–3. **Drive: 6 plays, 19 yards, 2:41.**
- CHI – Kevin Butler 45-yard field goal, 0:23. Chiefs 14–6. **Drive: 7 plays, 32 yards, 1:16.**

**Third quarter**

- CHI – Tim Worley 25-yard run (kick blocked), 8:16. Chiefs 14–12. **Drive: 6 plays, 74 yards, 3:37.**
- KC – Nick Lowery 20-yard field goal, 0:09. Chiefs 17–12. **Drive: 14 plays, 85 yards, 8:07.**

**Fourth quarter**

- CHI – Neal Anderson 1-yard run (Kevin Butler kick), 3:09. Bears 19–17. **Drive: 3 plays, 4 yards, 1:20.**

**Top passers**

- CHI – Jim Harbaugh – 13/20, 98 yards, 2 INT
- KC – Dave Krieg – 14/28, 157 yards, INT

**Top rushers**

- CHI – Tim Worley – 11 rushes, 59 yards, TD
- KC – Marcus Allen – 16 rushes, 78 yards, 2 TD

**Top receivers**

- CHI – Craig Heyward – 2 receptions, 24 yards
- KC – J. J. Birden – 3 receptions, 43 yards

==== Week 13: vs. Buffalo Bills ====
Week 13: Buffalo Bills at Kansas City Chiefs – Game summary

Quarter	1	2	3	4	Total
Bills	7	0	0	0	**7**
**Chiefs**	7	3	10	3	**23**

at Arrowhead Stadium, Kansas City, Missouri

- Date: November 28
- Game time: 3:00 p.m. CST
- Game weather: Clear, 45 °F (7 °C)
- Game attendance: 74,452
- Referee: Dale Hamer
- TV announcers (NBC): Marv Albert, Mike Ditka and O.J. Simpson
- Recap, Game Book

Game information

**First quarter**

- BUF – Kenneth Davis 9-yard run (Steve Christie kick), 4:14. Bills 7–0. **Drive: 13 plays, 80 yards, 6:04.**
- KC – Marcus Allen 18-yard pass from Joe Montana (Nick Lowery kick), 0:12. Tied 7–7. **Drive: 4 plays, 28 yards, 1:35.**

**Second quarter**

- KC – Nick Lowery 30-yard field goal, 7:43. Chiefs 10–7. **Drive: 12 plays, 55 yards, 6:13.**

**Third quarter**

- KC – Keith Cash 1-yard pass from Joe Montana (Nick Lowery kick), 11:18. Chiefs 17–7. **Drive: 7 plays, 80 yards, 3:42.**
- KC – Nick Lowery 22-yard field goal, 2:23. Chiefs 20–7. **Drive: 6 plays, 13 yards, 3:11.**

**Fourth quarter**

- KC – Nick Lowery 34-yard field goal, 5:11. Chiefs 23–7. **Drive: 13 plays, 50 yards, 7:00.**

**Top passers**

- BUF – Jim Kelly – 23/36, 214 yards, 3 INT
- KC – Joe Montana – 18/32, 208 yards, 2 TD, INT

**Top rushers**

- BUF – Thurman Thomas – 15 rushes, 25 yards
- KC – Marcus Allen – 22 rushes, 74 yards

**Top receivers**

- BUF – Pete Metzelaars – 10 receptions, 98 yards
- KC – Keith Cash – 4 receptions, 51 yards, TD

==== Week 14: at Seattle Seahawks ====
Week 14: Kansas City Chiefs at Seattle Seahawks – Game summary

Quarter	1	2	3	4	Total
**Chiefs**	10	7	14	0	**31**
Seahawks	3	3	7	3	**16**

at Kingdome, Seattle, Washington

- Date: December 5
- Game time: 3:00 p.m. CST/1:00 p.m. PST
- Game weather: None (indoor stadium)
- Game attendance: 58,551
- Referee: Jerry Markbreit
- TV announcers (NBC): Dan Hicks and Joe Gibbs
- Recap, Game Book

Game information

**First quarter**

- SEA – John Kasay 22-yard field goal, 9:27. Seahawks 3–0. **Drive: 9 plays, 52 yards, 5:33.**
- KC – Marcus Allen 1-yard run (Nick Lowery kick), 5:57. Chiefs 7–3. **Drive: 8 plays, 78 yards, 3:30.**
- KC – Nick Lowery 47-yard field goal, 0:29. Chiefs 10–3. **Drive: 9 plays, 49 yards, 3:45.**

**Second quarter**

- KC – Derrick Thomas 86-yard fumble return (Nick Lowery kick), 9:00. Chiefs 17–3.
- SEA – John Kasay 26-yard field goal, 4:23. Chiefs 17–6. **Drive: 13 plays, 68 yards, 6:46.**

**Third quarter**

- KC – Marcus Allen 1-yard run (Nick Lowery kick), 11:12. Chiefs 24–6. **Drive: 2 plays, 13 yards, 0:41.**
- KC – Marcus Allen 30-yard run (Nick Lowery kick), 8:56. Chiefs 31–6. **Drive: 2 plays, 47 yards, 0:39.**
- SEA – Chris Warren 1-yard run (John Kasay kick), 4:50. Chiefs 31–13. **Drive: 8 plays, 85 yards, 4:06.**

**Fourth quarter**

- SEA – John Kasay 37-yard field goal, 9:53. Chiefs 31–16. **Drive: 7 plays, 61 yards, 3:28.**

**Top passers**

- KC – Joe Montana – 20/30, 239 yards
- SEA – Rick Mirer – 18/30, 287 yards, 2 INT

**Top rushers**

- KC – Marcus Allen – 12 rushes, 73 yards, 3 TD
- SEA – Chris Warren – 18 rushes, 59 yards, TD

**Top receivers**

- KC – Willie Davis – 3 receptions, 67 yards
- SEA – Brian Blades – 7 receptions, 134 yards

==== Week 15: at Denver Broncos ====
Week 15: Kansas City Chiefs at Denver Broncos – Game summary

Quarter	1	2	3	4	Total
Chiefs	7	7	7	0	**21**
**Broncos**	3	7	7	10	**27**

at Mile High Stadium, Denver, Colorado

- Date: December 12
- Game time: 3:00 p.m. CST/2:00 p.m. MST
- Game weather: Cloudy, 51 °F (11 °C)
- Game attendance: 75,822
- Referee: Bernie Kukar
- TV announcers (NBC): Dick Enberg and Bob Trumpy
- Recap, Game Book

Game information

**First quarter**

- KC – Jonathan Hayes 11-yard pass from Joe Montana (Nick Lowery kick), 10:04. Chiefs 7–0. **Drive: 9 plays, 65 yards, 4:56.**
- DEN – Jason Elam 36-yard field goal, 2:51. Chiefs 7–3. **Drive: 8 plays, 43 yards, 4:05.**

**Second quarter**

- KC – Marcus Allen 4-yard run (Nick Lowery kick), 7:24. Chiefs 14–3. **Drive: 10 plays, 80 yards, 4:17.**
- DEN – Shannon Sharpe 9-yard pass from John Elway (Jason Elam kick), 0:22. Chiefs 14–10. **Drive: 11 plays, 74 yards, 4:57.**

**Third quarter**

- DEN – Shannon Sharpe 14-yard pass from John Elway (Jason Elam kick), 9:04. Broncos 17–14. **Drive: 12 plays, 80 yards, 5:56.**
- KC – Willie Davis 29-yard pass from Joe Montana (Nick Lowery kick), 2:59. Chiefs 21–17. **Drive: 2 plays, 25 yards, 1:06.**

**Fourth quarter**

- DEN – Shannon Sharpe 6-yard pass from John Elway (Jason Elam kick), 10:34. Broncos 24–21. **Drive: 3 plays, 11 yards, 1:24.**
- DEN – Jason Elam 53-yard field goal, 2:26. Broncos 27–21. **Drive: 11 plays, 48 yards, 5:02.**

**Top passers**

- KC – Joe Montana – 17/30, 237 yards, 2 TD, INT
- DEN – John Elway – 20/30, 221 yards, 3 TD, 2 INT

**Top rushers**

- KC – Marcus Allen – 14 rushes, 41 yards, TD
- DEN – Rod Bernstine – 23 rushes, 90 yards

**Top receivers**

- KC – J. J. Birden – 5 receptions, 95 yards
- DEN – Shannon Sharpe – 10 receptions, 65 yards, 3 TD

==== Week 16: vs. San Diego Chargers ====
Week 16: San Diego Chargers at Kansas City Chiefs – Game summary

Quarter	1	2	3	4	Total
Chargers	10	7	0	7	**24**
**Chiefs**	0	14	7	7	**28**

at Arrowhead Stadium, Kansas City, Missouri

- Date: December 19
- Game time: 3:00 p.m. CST
- Game weather: Clear, 50 °F (10 °C)
- Game attendance: 74,778
- Referee: Bob McElwee
- TV announcers (NBC): Charlie Jones and Todd Christensen
- Recap, Game Book

Game information

**First quarter**

- SD – Ronnie Harmon 28-yard pass from Stan Humphries (John Carney kick), 13:25. Chargers 7–0. **Drive: 3 plays, 30 yards, 1:14.**
- SD – John Carney 38-yard field goal, 11:13. Chargers 10–0. **Drive: 4 plays, 6 yards, 1:49.**

**Second quarter**

- SD – Duane Young 3-yard pass from John Friesz (John Carney kick), 14:57. Chargers 17–0. **Drive: 9 plays, 60 yards, 3:58.**
- KC – Marcus Allen 1-yard run (Nick Lowery kick), 7:32. Chargers 17–7. **Drive: 14 plays, 77 yards, 7:25.**
- KC – Willie Davis 9-yard pass from Joe Montana (Nick Lowery kick), 2:10. Chargers 17–14. **Drive: 8 plays, 66 yards, 3:43.**

**Third quarter**

- KC – J. J. Birden 4-yard pass from Joe Montana (Nick Lowery kick), 4:39. Chiefs 21–17. **Drive: 5 plays, 20 yards, 1:34.**

**Fourth quarter**

- KC – Willie Davis 28-yard pass from Dave Krieg (Nick Lowery kick), 12:54. Chiefs 28–17. **Drive: 6 plays, 60 yards, 2:56.**
- SD – Natrone Means 2-yard run (John Carney kick), 5:27. Chiefs 28–24. **Drive: 6 plays, 32 yards, 2:56.**

**Top passers**

- SD – John Friesz – 19/38, 161 yards, TD, 2 INT
- KC – Joe Montana – 18/32, 168 yards, 2 TD, INT

**Top rushers**

- SD – Marion Butts – 15 rushes, 61 yards
- KC – Todd McNair – 8 rushes, 42 yards

**Top receivers**

- SD – Anthony Miller – 5 receptions, 67 yards
- KC – Willie Davis – 4 receptions, 82 yards, 2 TD

==== Week 17: at Minnesota Vikings ====
Week 17: Kansas City Chiefs at Minnesota Vikings – Game summary

Quarter	1	2	3	4	Total
Chiefs	0	3	0	7	**10**
**Vikings**	3	7	10	10	**30**

at Hubert H. Humphrey Metrodome, Minneapolis, Minnesota

- Date: December 26
- Game time: 7:00 p.m. CST
- Game weather: None (indoor stadium)
- Game attendance: 59,236
- Referee: Gordon McCarter
- TV announcers (ESPN): Mike Patrick and Joe Theismann
- Recap, Game Book

Game information

**First quarter**

- MIN – Fuad Reveiz 22-yard field goal, 9:40. Vikings 3–0. **Drive: 11 plays, 46 yards, 4:33.**

**Second quarter**

- MIN – Cris Carter 31-yard pass from Jim McMahon (Fuad Reveiz kick), 12:17. Vikings 10–0. **Drive: 1 play, 31 yards, 0:07.**
- KC – Nick Lowery 42-yard field goal, 0:09. Vikings 10–3. **Drive: 9 plays, 58 yards, 1:35.**

**Third quarter**

- MIN – Cris Carter 29-yard pass from Jim McMahon (Fuad Reveiz kick), 12:07. Vikings 17–3. **Drive: 5 plays, 73 yards, 2:53.**
- MIN – Fuad Reveiz 19-yard field goal, 6:54. Vikings 20–3. **Drive: 8 plays, 27 yards, 4:18.**

**Fourth quarter**

- MIN – Scottie Graham 6-yard run (Fuad Reveiz kick), 11:43. Vikings 27–3. **Drive: 11 plays, 80 yards, 6:49.**
- MIN – Fuad Reveiz 34-yard field goal, 4:42. Vikings 30–3. **Drive: 9 plays, 38 yards, 5:35.**
- KC – Keith Cash 2-yard pass from Dave Krieg (Nick Lowery kick), 0:30. Vikings 30–10. **Drive: 6 plays, 59 yards, 1:20.**

**Top passers**

- KC – Joe Montana – 17/24, 121 yards, 2 INT
- MIN – Jim McMahon – 17/25, 219 yards, 2 TD, INT

**Top rushers**

- KC – Todd McNair – 6 rushes, 19 yards
- MIN – Scottie Graham – 33 rushes, 166 yards, TD

**Top receivers**

- KC – Keith Cash – 5 receptions, 53 yards, TD
- MIN – Cris Carter – 5 receptions, 88 yards, 2 TD

==== Week 18: vs. Seattle Seahawks ====
Week 18: Seattle Seahawks at Kansas City Chiefs – Game summary

Quarter	1	2	3	4	Total
Seahawks	3	7	0	14	**24**
**Chiefs**	10	17	0	7	**34**

at Arrowhead Stadium, Kansas City, Missouri

- Date: January 2
- Game time: 12:00 p.m. CST
- Game weather: Cloudy, 38 °F (3 °C)
- Game attendance: 72,136
- Referee: Tom White
- TV announcers (NBC): Dan Hicks and Joe Gibbs
- Recap, Game Book

Game information

**First quarter**

- SEA – John Kasay 55-yard field goal, 12:05. Seahawks 3–0. **Drive: 5 plays, 15 yards, 1:53.**
- KC – Willie Davis 14-yard pass from Joe Montana (Nick Lowery kick), 8:45. Chiefs 7–3. **Drive: 7 plays, 76 yards, 3:20.**
- KC – Nick Lowery 23-yard field goal. Chiefs 10–3. **Drive: 10 plays, 36 yards, 4:17.**

**Second quarter**

- KC – Todd McNair 3-yard run (Nick Lowery kick), 9:15. Chiefs 17–3. **Drive: 12 plays, 54 yards, 6:48.**
- KC – Albert Lewis blocked punt recovery in end zone (Nick Lowery kick), 0:53. Chiefs 24–3.
- SEA – Tracy Johnson 2-yard pass from Rick Mirer (John Kasay kick), 0:52. Chiefs 24–10. **Drive: 6 plays, 80 yards, 1:13.**
- KC – Nick Lowery 47-yard field goal, 0:00. Chiefs 27–10. **Drive: 6 plays, 50 yards, 0:32.**

**Third quarter**

- No scoring plays.

**Fourth quarter**

- SEA – John Williams 23-yard run (John Kasay kick), 11:44. Chiefs 27–17. **Drive: 2 plays, 32 yards, 0:50.**
- SEA – Ferrell Edmunds 4-yard pass from Rick Mirer (John Kasay kick), 6:27. Chiefs 27–24. **Drive: 10 plays, 34 yards, 5:17.**
- KC – Todd McNair 2-yard run (Nick Lowery kick), 0:46. Chiefs 34–24. **Drive: 5 plays, 11 yards, 1:17.**

**Top passers**

- SEA – Rick Mirer – 19/30, 140 yards, 2 TD
- KC – Joe Montana – 18/28, 210 yards, TD, INT

**Top rushers**

- SEA – John Williams – 16 rushes, 102 yards, TD
- KC – Todd McNair – 17 rushes, 46 yards, 2 TD

**Top receivers**

- SEA – Brian Blades – 5 receptions, 69 yards
- KC – J. J. Birden – 6 receptions, 68 yards

=== Standings ===
AFC West
	W	L	T	PCT	PF	PA	STK
^{(3)} Kansas City Chiefs	11	5	0	.688	328	291	W1
^{(4)} Los Angeles Raiders	10	6	0	.625	306	326	W1
^{(5)} Denver Broncos	9	7	0	.563	373	284	L2
San Diego Chargers	8	8	0	.500	322	290	W2
Seattle Seahawks	6	10	0	.375	280	314	L1

== Postseason ==
=== Schedule ===
Round	Date	Opponent (seed)	Result	Record	Venue	Attendance	Recap
Wild Card	January 8, 1994	Pittsburgh Steelers (6)	W 27–24 (OT)	1–0	Arrowhead Stadium	74,515	Recap
Divisional	January 16, 1994	at Houston Oilers (2)	W 28–20	2–0	Houston Astrodome	64,011	Recap
AFC Championship	January 23, 1994	at Buffalo Bills (1)	L 13–30	2–1	Rich Stadium	76,642	Recap

=== Game summaries ===
==== AFC Wild Card Playoffs: vs. (6) Pittsburgh Steelers ====
AFC Wild Card Playoffs: (6) Pittsburgh Steelers at (3) Kansas City Chiefs – Game summary

Quarter	1	2	3	4	OT	Total
Steelers	7	10	0	7	0	24
Chiefs	7	0	3	14	3	27

at Arrowhead Stadium, Kansas City, Missouri

- Date: January 8
- Game time: 11:30 a.m. CST
- Game weather: 25 °F (−4 °C)
- Game attendance: 74,515
- Referee: Gary Lane
- TV announcers (ABC): Al Michaels, Frank Gifford, Dan Dierdorf and Lynn Swann
- Recap, Game Book

Game information

First quarter

- PIT – Adrian Cooper 10-yard pass from Neil O'Donnell (Gary Anderson kick), 8:45. Steelers 7–0. Drive: 9 plays, 66 yards, 5:00.
- KC – J. J. Birden 23-yard pass from Dave Krieg (Nick Lowery kick), 1:39. Tied 7–7. Drive: 7 plays, 75 yards, 2:21.

Second quarter

- PIT – Gary Anderson 30-yard field goal, 9:34. Steelers 10–7. Drive: 15 plays, 63 yards, 7:05.
- PIT – Ernie Mills 26-yard pass from Neil O'Donnell (Gary Anderson kick), 0:18. Steelers 17–7. Drive: 6 plays, 51 yards, 0:37.

Third quarter

- KC – Nick Lowery 23-yard field goal, 1:09. Steelers 17–10. Drive: 11 plays, 49 yards, 5:11.

Fourth quarter

- KC – Marcus Allen 2-yard run (Lin Elliott kick), 8:58. Tied 17–17. Drive: 9 plays, 80 yards, 5:18.
- PIT – Eric Green 22-yard pass from Neil O'Donnell (Gary Anderson kick), 4:11. Steelers 24–17. Drive: 9 plays, 74 yards, 4:47.
- KC – Tim Barnett 7-yard pass from Joe Montana (Nick Lowery kick), 1:43. Tied 24–24. Drive: 4 plays, 9 yards, 0:46.

Overtime

- KC – Nick Lowery 32-yard field goal, 3:57. Chiefs 27–24. Drive: 11 plays, 66 yards, 5:59.

Top passers

- PIT – Neil O'Donnell – 23/42, 286 yards, 3 TD
- KC – Joe Montana – 28/43, 276 yards, TD

Top rushers

- PIT – Leroy Thompson – 25 rushes, 60 yards
- KC – Marcus Allen – 21 rushes, 67 yards, TD

Top receivers

- PIT – Jeff Graham – 7 receptions, 96 yards
- KC – J. J. Birden – 6 receptions, 72 yards, TD

Chiefs kicker Nick Lowery made the winning 32-yard field goal after 11:03 of overtime. The Steelers scored first on tight end Adrian Cooper's 10-yard touchdown reception from quarterback Neil O'Donnell. Kansas City then tied the game after backup quarterback Dave Krieg, who temporarily replaced injured starter Joe Montana, threw a 23-yard touchdown to wide receiver J.J. Birden. However, Pittsburgh scored 10 unanswered points in the second quarter: kicker Gary Anderson's 30-yard field goal and O'Donnell's 26-yard touchdown completion to wide receiver Ernie Mills. After Lowery made a 23-yard field goal in the third quarter, the Chiefs eventually tied the game in the fourth period with running back Marcus Allen's 2-yard touchdown. However, the Steelers marched 74-yards to take the lead on O'Donnell's third touchdown pass of the game, a 22-yard score to tight end Eric Green. In the final minutes of regulation, Keith Cash blocked a Pittsburgh punt and Fred Jones returned it to the Steelers 9-yard line. On fourth down, wide receiver Tim Barnett scored on a 7-yard touchdown reception from Montana to tie the game. Then after forcing Pittsburgh to punt, Kansas City drove 47 yards to set up Lowery's 43-yard field-goal attempt in the closing seconds, but the kick was wide right and thus the game went into overtime. Montana finished the game with 276 passing yards and a touchdown, with no interceptions. With the win, the Chiefs were able to advance to the Divisional Round to face the Oilers. This would be both the Chiefs last home playoff win until 2018 & their last playoff win against the Steelers until 2021.

==== AFC Divisional Playoffs: at (2) Houston Oilers ====
AFC Divisional Playoffs: (3) Kansas City Chiefs at (2) Houston Oilers – Game summary

Quarter	1	2	3	4	Total
Chiefs	0	0	7	21	28
Oilers	10	0	0	10	20

at Houston Astrodome, Houston, Texas

- Date: January 16
- Game time: 3:00 p.m. CST
- Game weather: None (indoor stadium)
- Game attendance: 64,011
- Referee: Gerry Austin
- TV announcers (NBC): Dick Enberg, Bob Trumpy, O.J. Simpson and Todd Christensen
- Recap, Game Book

Game information

First quarter

- HOU – Al Del Greco 49-yard field goal, 11:10. Oilers 3–0. Drive: 4 plays, –8 yards, 1:13.
- HOU – Gary Brown 2-yard run (Al Del Greco kick), 1:59. Oilers 10–0. Drive: 11 plays, 80 yards, 6:30.

Second quarter

- No scoring plays.

Third quarter

- KC – Keith Cash 7-yard pass from Joe Montana (Nick Lowery kick), 10:19. Oilers 10–7. Drive: 7 plays, 71 yards, 3:30.

Fourth quarter

- HOU – Al Del Greco 43-yard field goal, 9:37. Oilers 13–7. Drive: 4 plays, –1 yard, 1:59.
- KC – J. J. Birden 11-yard pass from Joe Montana (Nick Lowery kick), 8:38. Chiefs 14–13. Drive: 2 plays, 71 yards, 0:59.
- KC – Willie Davis 18-yard pass from Joe Montana (Nick Lowery kick), 7:44. Chiefs 21–13. Drive: 3 plays, 12 yards, 0:42.
- HOU – Ernest Givins 7-yard pass from Warren Moon (Al Del Greco kick), 3:35. Chiefs 21–20. Drive: 9 plays, 80 yards, 4:09.
- KC – Marcus Allen 21-yard run (Nick Lowery kick), 1:55. Chiefs 28–20. Drive: 6 plays, 79 yards, 1:40.

Top passers

- KC – Joe Montana – 22/38, 299 yards, 3 TD, 2 INT
- HOU – Warren Moon – 32/43, 306 yards, TD, INT

Top rushers

- KC – Marcus Allen – 14 rushes, 74 yards, TD
- HOU – Gary Brown – 11 rushes, 17 yards, TD

Top receivers

- KC – Willie Davis – 5 receptions, 96 yards, TD
- HOU – Haywood Jeffires – 9 receptions, 88 yards

Chiefs quarterback Joe Montana threw three touchdown passes in the second half to give his team a 28–20 win. The Oilers jumped to a 10–0 lead in the first quarter with kicker Al Del Greco's 49-yard field goal and running back Gary Brown's 2-yard touchdown. Then after a scoreless second period, Montana threw a 7-yard touchdown pass to tight end Keith Cash in the third quarter. In the fourth period, Del Greco kicked a 43-yard field goal to give Houston a 13–7 lead. But aided by a 38-yard pass interference penalty, the Chiefs advanced 71 yards to score on wide receiver J.J. Birden's 11-yard touchdown reception from Montana. On the Oilers' next possession, Kansas City defensive lineman Dan Saleaumua recovered a fumble by Houston quarterback Warren Moon, setting up Montana's 18-yard touchdown pass to wide receiver Willie Davis. The Oilers then drove 80 yards to score on wide receiver Ernest Givins' 7-yard touchdown catch, but the Chiefs responded with running back Marcus Allen's game-clinching 21-yard touchdown run that capped off a 79-yard drive. The Oilers had 1:51 left to score but failed on a 4th down attempt on their own 20 yard line. With the win, Kansas City advanced to the AFC Championship to face the Bills. However, this would be both the Chiefs last playoff win until 2015 & their last win in the Divisional Round until 2018.

==== AFC Championship: at (1) Buffalo Bills ====
AFC Championship: (3) Kansas City Chiefs at (1) Buffalo Bills – Game summary

Quarter	1	2	3	4	Total
Chiefs	6	0	7	0	13
Bills	7	13	0	10	30

at Rich Stadium, Orchard Park, New York

- Date: January 23
- Game time: 12:30 p.m. EST/11:30 a.m. CST
- Game weather: Cloudy, light snow, 29 °F (−2 °C)
- Game attendance: 76,642
- Referee: Johnny Grier
- TV announcers (NBC): Dick Enberg, Bob Trumpy, O.J. Simpson and Will McDonough
- Recap, Game Book

Game information

First quarter

- BUF – Thurman Thomas 12-yard run (Steve Christie kick), 6:49. Bills 7–0. Drive: 6 plays, 47 yards, 1:52.
- KC – Nick Lowery 31-yard field goal, 2:14. Bills 7–3. Drive: 10 plays, 51 yards, 4:35.
- KC – Nick Lowery 31-yard field goal, 0:59. Bills 7–6. Drive: 5 plays, 11 yards, 1:35.

Second quarter

- BUF – Thurman Thomas 3-yard run (Steve Christie kick), 12:02. Bills 14–6. Drive: 9 plays, 80 yards, 3:37.
- BUF – Steve Christie 23-yard field goal, 7:02. Bills 17–6. Drive: 10 plays, 41 yards, 3:31.
- BUF – Steve Christie 25-yard field goal, 2:01. Bills 20–6. Drive: 10 plays, 56 yards, 3:55.

Third quarter

- KC – Marcus Allen 1-yard run (Nick Lowery kick), 3:06. Bills 20–13. Drive: 14 plays, 90 yards, 7:18.

Fourth quarter

- BUF – Steve Christie 18-yard field goal, 11:55. Bills 23–13. Drive: 14 plays, 79 yards, 6:11.
- BUF – Thurman Thomas 3-yard run (Steve Christie kick), 5:30. Bills 30–13. Drive: 8 plays, 52 yards, 4:41.

Top passers

- KC – Dave Krieg – 16/29, 198 yards, INT
- BUF – Jim Kelly – 17/27, 160 yards

Top rushers

- KC – Marcus Allen – 18 rushes, 50 yards, TD
- BUF – Thurman Thomas – 33 rushes, 186 yards, 3 TD

Top receivers

- KC – Keith Cash – 6 receptions, 87 yards
- BUF – Andre Reed – 4 receptions, 49 yards

Running back Thurman Thomas led the Bills to the 30–13 victory by recording 186 rushing yards, 3 receptions for 22 yards, and three touchdowns. Buffalo scored first on Thomas' 12-yard touchdown run before Chiefs kicker Nick Lowery kicked two field goals. In the second quarter, Thomas scored on a 3-yard touchdown and Bills kicker Steve Christie made two field goals to extend the lead 20–6. With 21 seconds left in the first half, the Chiefs reached the Buffalo 5-yard line, but quarterback Joe Montana's pass was intercepted by Bills defensive back Henry Jones. Montana later suffered a concussion during the third play of the third quarter and left the game. Kansas City backup quarterback Dave Krieg then led his team on a 90-yard drive to score on running back Marcus Allen's 1-yard touchdown. However, Buffalo scored 10 unanswered points in the final period, an 18-yard field goal by Christie and a 3-yard touchdown by Thomas, to preserve the victory. This would be the Chiefs last appearance in the AFC Championship until 2018. As of 2025, this remains the Chiefs most recent playoff loss to Buffalo. They also remain the last team to lose to Buffalo in the AFC Championship
