= 1993 Los Angeles Raiders season =

NFL team season

- Owner: Al Davis
- General manager: Al Davis
- Head coach: Art Shell
- Offensive coordinator: Tom Walsh
- Defensive coordinator: Gunther Cunningham
- Home stadium: L.A. Memorial Coliseum

Results
- Record: 10–6
- Division place: 2nd AFC West
- Playoffs: Won Wild Card Playoffs (vs. Broncos) 42–24; Lost Divisional Playoffs (at Bills) 23–29

The 1993 Los Angeles Raiders season was the franchise's 34th season overall, and the franchise's 24th season in the National Football League. The team improved upon its 7–9 record in the previous season and returned to the NFL playoffs after a one-year absence, but lost in the AFC Divisional game to the Buffalo Bills.

This was the Raiders' final playoff appearance in Los Angeles, and would not return to the playoffs until 2000, when the franchise returned to Oakland. This would be the final season for receiver Willie Gault and defensive end Howie Long before their retirements. Additionally, defensive end Greg Townsend, who along with Long and center Don Mosebar were the only players left from the Raiders' Super Bowl XVIII championship team of 10 years earlier, left to play for the Philadelphia Eagles (in 1997; Townsend would return to the Raiders, by then having returned to their original home in Oakland, for his final season).

== Offseason ==
During the offseason the Raiders signed quarterback Jeff Hostetler from the New York Giants to lead the offense.

Joe Kelly, a former first round pick of the Bengals was signed to fill the middle linebacker slot.

Left tackle Gerald Perry was signed from the Rams to solidify the left tackle position which the Raiders had struggled to fill since the retirement of former Raider left tackles Bruce Davis and Art Shell.

Future Hall of Famer Marcus Allen, the team's all-time leading rusher, was allowed to leave as a free agent and later signed with the Kansas City Chiefs.

=== Notable Cuts ===
To fill Allen's spot, the Raiders signed running back Gaston Green, formerly of the Denver Broncos. However, Green did not make the team and was cut prior to the 1993 season.

The Los Angeles Raiders also brought back James Lofton from the Buffalo Bills. Lofton played for the Raiders during the 1987–1988 seasons. But like Green, he was cut prior to the 1993 season.

In training camp before the season, the Raiders 1991 forst round draft pick Todd Marinovich failed his third NFL drug test, this time for marijuana, and was suspended for the 1993 season. The Raiders released Marinovich on the final cutdown, choosing not to pay for Marinovich's salary while being suspended in the year before the salary cap would go into effect.

=== NFL draft ===
The 1993 draft for the Los Angeles Raiders eventually produced several starters. With the 12th pick in the first round the Raiders drafted safety Patrick Bates from Texas A&M.

The Raiders did not have a second round pick.

In the third round with the 58th pick the team drafted quarterback Billy Joe Hobert from Washington. Also in the third round with the 72nd pick the Raiders took defensive back James Trapp from Clemson.

In the fifth round the team drafted wide receiver Olanda Truitt from Mississippi State. The Raiders next pick occurred in the seventh round and with the 181st pick the team took linebacker Greg Biekert from Colorado.

The Raiders' final pick of the 1993 draft occurred in the 8th round, where they drafted running back Greg Robinson from Louisiana-Monroe.

==== Legacy ====
Greg Biekert proved to be the best of the group. He went on to become a primary starter in 1994 and was a starter for the Raiders until 2001. He started 123 out of a possible 144 games with the Raiders with 15 sacks, 5 fumble recoveries and 3 interceptions. As the Raiders middle linebacker he also recorded 704 tackles and 212 assists with the Raiders.

As a rookie running back Greg Robinson started 12 games and led the 1993 Los Angeles Raiders in rushing with 591 yards and a touchdown. He also added 15 receptions for 142 yards.

James Trapp was the third best of the bunch and he stayed on the Raiders roster as a sometime starter and as a reserve until the end of the 1996 season. He then spent four years with the Ravens and helped Baltimore achieve their first Super Bowl victory. With the Raiders he started 26 out of 88 games that he appeared in which included 4 interceptions and 3 fumble recoveries.

Olanda Truitt ended up leaving Los Angeles prior to the 1993 season and spent one year with the Vikings before spending two straight seasons with Washington. During that time he caught just 15 passes for 283 yards. In 1996, he returned to the Raiders and played two more years for them. He ended his career with just 22 catches. Hobert appeared in just 12 games for the Raiders between 1993 and 1996 which included 5 starts. Hobert went 0–5 as the Raiders starter in 1995–1996 and eventually left the team. He passed for 3,371 yards with the Raiders, Saints and Bills.

Although Bates was the Raiders first round choice in the 1993 draft, he played for the Raiders for only two years (93–94) recording just 69 tackles in 29 game appearances. In 1996, he played one season with Atlanta.

== Personnel ==
=== Staff / Coaches ===
1993 Los Angeles Raiders staff
Front office: President of the General Partner – Al Davis; Director of Football Operations – Steve Ortmayer; Senior Executive – John Herrera; Head coaches: Head coach – Art Shell; Offensive coaches: Offense – Tom Walsh; Offensive backs – Joe Scannella; Wide receivers – Fred Biletnikoff; Tight ends – Terry Robiskie; Offensive line – Bill Meyers; Offensive line – Mike White	Defensive coaches: Defense/Linebackers – Gunther Cunningham; Defensive line – Ray Hamilton; Linebackers – Jim Haslett; Defensive backs – Odis McKinney; Defensive backs – Jack Stanton; Special teams coaches: Special teams – Steve Ortmayer; Strength and conditioning: Strength and conditioning – Todd Sperber; Strength and conditioning – Doug Wilkerson

=== Roster ===
1993 Los Angeles Raiders roster
Quarterbacks (QB): 11 Vince Evans; 12 Billy Joe Hobert; 15 Jeff Hostetler; Running backs (RB): 38 Nick Bell; 23 Randy Jordan; 41 Napoleon McCallum; 21 Tyrone Montgomery; 28 Greg Robinson; 35 Steve Smith FB; Wide receivers (WR): 81 Tim Brown PR; 83 Willie Gault KR; 80 Daryl Hobbs; 86 Rocket Ismail KR; 82 James Jett; 89 Alexander Wright; Tight ends (TE): 84 John Duff; 88 Ethan Horton; 39 Kevin Smith	Offensive linemen (OL): 79 Ken Lanier T; 65 Max Montoya G; 72 Don Mosebar C; 64 Todd Peat G; 71 Gerald Perry T; 78 Greg Skrepenak T; 77 Rich Stephens G/T; 68 Bruce Wilkerson T; 76 Steve Wisniewski G; Defensive linemen (DL): 97 Willie Broughton DT; 56 Aundray Bruce DE; 92 Ferric Collons DE; 74 Nolan Harrison DT; 75 Howie Long DE/DT; 91 Chester McGlockton DT; 94 Anthony Smith DE; 93 Greg Townsend DE	Linebackers (LB): 54 Greg Biekert MLB; 52 Mike Jones OLB; 57 Joe Kelly MLB; 99 Winston Moss OLB; 51 Aaron Wallace OLB; Defensive backs (DB): 33 Eddie Anderson FS; 29 Patrick Bates FS; 31 Rickey Dixon FS; 46 Torin Dorn CB; 45 David Fulcher SS; 20 Derrick Hoskins SS; 25 Dan Land CB/S; 36 Terry McDaniel CB; 37 James Trapp CB; 48 Lionel Washington CB; Special teams (ST): 7 Jeff Gossett P; 18 Jeff Jaeger K; 67 Dan Turk LS	Practice squad: 24 Bryan Addison S; 19 John Morton WR; 62 Tom Roth G; 27 Charlie Young RB; 53 Glen Young LB; Reserve: 87 Andrew Glover TE (IR); 85 Charles Jordan WR (IR); 66 Steve Wright T (IR); 53 active, 3 inactive, 5 practice squad Rookies in italics

== Regular season ==
=== Schedule ===
Week	Date	Opponent	Result	Record	Venue	Attendance	Recap
1	September 5	Minnesota Vikings	**W** 24–7	1–0	Los Angeles Memorial Coliseum	44,120	Recap
2	September 12	at **Seattle Seahawks**	**W** 17–13	2–0	Kingdome	58,836	Recap
3	September 19	Cleveland Browns	**L** 16–19	2–1	Los Angeles Memorial Coliseum	48,617	Recap
4	Bye						
5	October 3	at **Kansas City Chiefs**	**L** 9–24	2–2	Arrowhead Stadium	77,395	Recap
6	October 10	New York Jets	**W** 24–20	3–2	Los Angeles Memorial Coliseum	41,627	Recap
7	October 18	at **Denver Broncos**	**W** 23–20	4–2	Mile High Stadium	75,712	Recap
8	Bye						
9	October 31	**San Diego Chargers**	**L** 23–30	4–3	Los Angeles Memorial Coliseum	45,122	Recap
10	November 7	at Chicago Bears	**W** 16–14	5–3	Soldier Field	59,750	Recap
11	November 14	**Kansas City Chiefs**	**L** 20–31	5–4	Los Angeles Memorial Coliseum	66,553	Recap
12	November 21	at **San Diego Chargers**	**W** 12–7	6–4	Jack Murphy Stadium	60,615	Recap
13	November 28	at Cincinnati Bengals	**L** 10–16	6–5	Riverfront Stadium	43,272	Recap
14	December 5	at Buffalo Bills	**W** 25–24	7–5	Rich Stadium	79,478	Recap
15	December 12	**Seattle Seahawks**	**W** 27–23	8–5	Los Angeles Memorial Coliseum	38,161	Recap
16	December 19	Tampa Bay Buccaneers	**W** 27–20	9–5	Los Angeles Memorial Coliseum	40,532	Recap
17	December 26	at Green Bay Packers	**L** 0–28	9–6	Lambeau Field	54,482	Recap
18	January 2	**Denver Broncos**	**W** 33–30 (OT)	10–6	Los Angeles Memorial Coliseum	66,904	Recap
Note: Intra-division opponents are in **bold** text.

== Standings ==
AFC West
	W	L	T	PCT	PF	PA	STK
^{(3)} Kansas City Chiefs	11	5	0	.688	328	291	W1
^{(4)} Los Angeles Raiders	10	6	0	.625	306	326	W1
^{(5)} Denver Broncos	9	7	0	.563	373	284	L2
San Diego Chargers	8	8	0	.500	322	290	W2
Seattle Seahawks	6	10	0	.375	280	314	L1

== Season summary ==
=== Week 1 vs Vikings ===
Jeff Hostetler completed 15 straight passes during the game which included a touchdown pass to Tim Brown. Cornerback Terry McDaniel intercepted a Jim McMahon pass and returned it 36 yards for a touchdown. Rookie running back Greg Robinson scored his only regular season touchdown as a Raider. Hostetler also rushed for 34 yards and defensive end Anthony Smith recorded 2 sacks.

=== Week 2 at Seahawks ===
Defensive End Anthony Smith sacked Seahawks quarterback Rick Mirer four times. Rookie Patrick Bates and Terry McDaniel each intercepted a pass and Jeff Hostetler rushed for a touchdown and tossed a touchdown pass to Tim Brown. Wide receivers Alexander Wright and Tim Brown totalled 13 receptions combined to pace the win.

=== Week 3 vs Browns ===
Week Three: Cleveland Browns (2–0) at Los Angeles Raiders (2–0)

Quarter	1	2	3	4	Total
Browns	0	0	0	19	19
Raiders	10	3	0	3	16

at Los Angeles Memorial Coliseum, Los Angeles, California

- Date: September 19, 1993
- Game time: 4:00 p.m. EDT
- Game weather: Sunny, 66 °F (19 °C)
- Game attendance: 48,617
- TV announcers (NBC): Marv Albert and Paul Maguire
- Box Score, Box Score

The Raiders dominated the Browns early and led 13–0. Defensive tackle Chester McGlockton intercepted a Bernie Kosar pass which set up one of the Raiders' two field goals. After that the Browns defense pressured Hostetler by sacking him six times and holding him to just 94 yards passing. The Raiders gained one first down in the second half and committed eight penalties. Browns running back Eric Metcalf scored the game-winning touchdown with just seconds remaining.

Team	Category	Player	Statistics
Browns	Passing	Vinny Testaverde	10/22, 159 Yds, TD, INT
Browns	Rushing	Tommy Vardell	14 Rush, 104 Yds
Browns	Receiving	Mark Carrier	5 Rec, 73 Yds
Raiders	Passing	Jeff Hostetler	11/25, 94 Yds, TD
Raiders	Rushing	Greg Robinson	18 Rush, 59 Yds
Raiders	Receiving	Steve Smith	4 Rec, 42 Yds

Scoring summary

Quarter	Time	Drive			Team	Scoring information	Score	
Quarter	Time	Plays	Yards	TOP	Team	Scoring information	CLE	LA
1	9:22				Raiders	Andrew Glover 2-yard touchdown reception from Jeff Hostetler, Jeff Jaeger kick good	0	7
1	1:07				Raiders	24-yard field goal by Jeff Jaeger	0	10
2	12:12				Raiders	27-yard field goal by Jeff Jaeger	0	13
4	8:23				Browns	32-yard field goal by Matt Stover	3	13
4	4:58				Raiders	53-yard field goal by Jeff Jaeger	3	16
4	2:26				Browns	Lawyer Tillman 12-yard touchdown reception from Vinny Testaverde, Matt Stover kick good	10	16
4	1:41				Raiders	Safety, Jeff Gossett ran out of end zone	12	16
4	0:02				Browns	Eric Metcalf 1-yard touchdown run, Matt Stover kick good	19	16
"TOP" = time of possession. For other American football terms, see Glossary of American football.							19	16

=== Week 5 at Chiefs ===
Former Raider Marcus Allen scored his 100th career rushing touchdown against his former team. Hostetler missed the game due to a knee injury and with veteran Vince Evans serving in his place the Raiders were unable to beat their chief rivals. The Raiders aided the Kansas City cause by committing 16 penalties for 173 yards.

=== Week 6 vs Jets ===
Raiders overcame a 17–0 Jet lead to win. Head coach Art Shell pulled a struggling Hostetler and Evans replaced him and the aging quarterback completed 14 passes for 247 yards and two touchdowns. During the third period and trailing 17–7 Evans hit Alexander Wright for a 68-yard touchdown pass. The Jets scored on a field goal to retake the lead 20–17. During a two-minute drill Evans drove the Raiders downfield. A third down was converted into a first down on a pass to James Jett. With four seconds remaining and with the ball inside the Jets one-yard line the Raiders ran a risky run play and running back Nick Bell scored a touchdown to defeat the New York Jets.

=== Week 7 at Broncos ===
On Monday Night Football quarterback Jeff Hostetler went 15 of 24 for 2 touchdowns. The Raiders dominated the first half and led 13–0 off two Jaeger field goals and a Hostetler touchdown pass to Alexander Wright. Denver fought their way back and scored 17 unanswered points to take a 17–13 lead. Raider James Jett scored on a 74-yard pass from Hostetler and the Raiders took the lead back from the Broncos. John Elway drove Denver downfield and rookie kicker Jason Elam kicked a field goal to tie the game 20–20. The Raiders responded with just seconds remaining with a Jeff Jaeger field goal from 53 yards away to beat the Broncos.

=== Week 9 vs Chargers ===
Halloween was all tricks for the Raiders and all treats for the Chargers as San Diego beat Los Angeles in a key game. This didn't stop Jeff Hostetler from passing for a Raider record 424 yards. The Raiders started the scoring on their first play from scrimmage with Tim Brown hauling in a Hostetler pass and racing 71 yards for a touchdown. Later and with the score tied 10–10 both Hostetler and Brown hooked up again for a 38-yard touchdown. San Diego retied the score 17–17 on a touchdown run by running back Marion Butts. The Raiders drove down the field and with the ball inside the San Diego 10-yard line, defensive back Donald Frank intercepted a Hostetler pass and ran back the interception 102 yards for a touchdown and a 24–17 San Diego lead. The Raiders could not get back into the game and despite 156 receiving yards by Brown the Raiders were defeated by the Chargers.

=== Week 10 at Bears ===
For the third time in five games the Raiders led early but saw their lead evaporate. Greg Robinson rushed for 70 yards and Napoleon McCallum added 50 more and one touchdown to overcome 11 penalties and 3 sacks of Hostetler. Los Angeles led 13–0 at halftime and just like the Cleveland game the Bears got themselves back in the game. The Raiders lead was cut to 13–7 on a Neal Anderson touchdown run but Jeff Jaeger saved the day by adding a field goal later in the fourth quarter. Bears quarterback Jim Harbaugh tossed a touchdown pass with just minutes remaining in the game to pull Chicago within two points. The Bears recovered their onside kick and drove within field goal range. Bears kicker Kevin Butler missed the field goal that would have won the game for Chicago.

=== Week 11 vs Chiefs ===
Once again the Raiders led early on a Hostetler touchdown pass to Ethan Horton and a touchdown run by Napoleon McCallum. Leading 14–0, the Raiders allowed Kansas City to go on a 31–6 run to beat the Raiders for the second straight time. Horton caught 6 passes for 69 yards and a touchdown against his old team.

=== Week 12 at Chargers ===
For the second time in four games the Raiders faced the San Diego Chargers. Jeff Jaeger kicked four field goals for the win but the Raiders had another nail biting game when San Diego scored a touchdown in the fourth quarter. Rookies Greg Robinson and James Jett had stellar games. Robinson accounted for 89 yards rushing and 13 yards receiving. Jett caught 7 passes for 138 yards. Also, future hall of famer Howie Long record two sacks.

=== Week 13 at Bengals ===
The Bengals were 0–10 entering the game and led the Raiders 13–0 as the fourth quarter began. The Raiders offense was unable to get anything going all day and two turnovers by Los Angeles granted them their fifth loss of the 1993 season. Chester McGlockton had three sacks.

=== Week 14 at Bills ===
Needing a win to keep their playoff hopes alive the Raiders overcame the three time AFC Champion Buffalo Bills. Jeff Hostetler rushed for a touchdown and threw for another. Jeff Jaeger added four field goals and Tim Brown caught 10 passes for 183 yards and a TD. During the fourth quarter the Bills led the Raiders 24–19. The Raiders defense forced Buffalo to punt. The Raiders ran just three plays, the first coming on a short completion to running back Nick Bell and a second to wide receiver James Jett. Then Hostetler knifed the football between three Buffalo defenders to receiver Tim Brown for a touchdown. Buffalo was driving for a game-winning field goal when Nolan Harrison forced Buffalo running back Thurman Thomas to fumble and the Raiders defense recovered to seal a 25–24 win.

=== Week 15 vs Seahawks ===
Tying to maintain their playoff dreams the Raiders defeated Seattle with the help of Cornerback Terry McDaniel who had a key interception. Hostetler, Jett and Brown all scored touchdowns after Seattle established a 9–3 lead. Leading 27–9 the Raiders allowed Seattle to reenter the game and the Seahawks scored the final 14 points of the game to cut the Raider lead 27–23. After their second touchdown the Seahawks were unable to recover their onside kick which preserved a Raider win.

=== Week 16 vs Buccaneers ===
The Raiders established a 14–0 lead before Tampa Bay forced their way back into the game. Alexander Wright recorded his first 100+ yard game as a Raider and Jeff Hostetler rushed for his fifth touchdown of the season. The Raiders defense recorded five sacks and forced 2 turnovers to preserve the victory. Tampa Bay's final ditch effort to win ended on a botched onside kick attempt and the Raiders prevailed.

=== Week 17 at Packers ===
Brett Favre beat the Raiders for the first of what would be four wins versus the Silver and Black. Sterling Sharpe torched the Raiders defense for 119 yards and a touchdown and the Packers running game burned the Raiders for 148 yards. Trailing 14–0, quarterback Jeff Hostetler suffered a concussion during a sack and was forced to leave the game. Vince Evans replaced him but fared no better than Hostetler, as both men completed just 18 of 38 passes. This is the game that gave birth to the "Lambeau Leap" when LeRoy Butler received a lateral from Reggie White, who recovered a fumble. Tim Brown did add 80 yards receiving, but a 25-yard fumble return and a long touchdown run gave the Packers an important 28–0 victory.

=== Week 18 at Broncos ===
Needing a win to make the playoffs the Los Angeles Raiders came back from a 17-point deficit twice in the game. Late in the fourth quarter the Raiders trailed Denver 30–23 but Jeff Hostetler and his offense drove Los Angeles down the field. On the final play of regulation Hostetler completed a third down pass to Alexander Wright for a 4-yard touchdown to force overtime. Denver won the overtime coin toss and John Elway drove Denver to a field goal opportunity. Rookie kicker Jason Elam missed his kick and the Raiders were granted new life. Hostetler drove Los Angeles down field again and Jeff Jaeger kicked a 47-yard field goal to send the Raiders to the 1993 playoffs. One week later the Raiders would host Denver again in the 1993 WildCard Playoffs.

== Classic comebacks ==
The 1993 season saw several Raider comebacks, these included:

- In Week 6 versus the New York Jets, the Raiders trailed 17–0 before coming back to win 24–20
- In Week 15 versus the Seattle Seahawks, the Raiders trailed 9–3 before coming back to win 27–23.
- In Week 17 the Raiders trailed Denver 17–0 and came back twice to tie and later win the game 33–30.

== Playoffs ==
=== AFC Wild Card ===
Los Angeles Raiders 42, Denver Broncos 24

Quarter	1	2	3	4	Total
Broncos	7	14	0	3	24
Raiders	14	7	14	7	42

at Los Angeles Memorial Coliseum, Los Angeles, California

- Game time: 4:00 p.m. EST/1:00 p.m. PST
- Game weather: 70 °F (21 °C), clear
- Game attendance: 65,314
- Referee: Bob McElwee
- TV announcers (NBC): Charlie Jones and Todd Christensen

Both teams entered the game with poor running games and backfield injuries. This made the passing attacks of both squads very important. During the first half both John Elway and Jeff Hostetler dominated with each man throwing three touchdown passes. After a 21–21 tie at halftime, Raiders running back Napoleon McCallum scored three rushing touchdowns in the second half to lead his team to the victory. Quarterback Jeff Hostetler completed 13 of 19 passes for 294 yards and 3 touchdowns. James Jett caught 3 passes for 111 yards and a touchdown. Tim Brown caught 3 passes for 86 yards and a touchdown. The game was tied 21–21 at halftime, but the Raiders pulled away with McCallum's three touchdowns in the second half.

=== AFC Divisional Playoff ===
Buffalo Bills 29, Los Angeles Raiders 23

Quarter	1	2	3	4	Total
Raiders	0	17	6	0	23
Bills	0	13	9	7	29

at Rich Stadium, Orchard Park, New York

- Game time: 12:30 p.m. EST
- Game weather: 0 °F (−18 °C), cloudy
- Game attendance: 61,923
- Referee: Red Cashion
- TV announcers (NBC): Marv Albert and Paul Maguire

In one of the coldest games in NFL history, the Bills overcame a 17–6 Raiders lead by scoring three times in a span of 6:18 in the second half. During the second half the Bills defense dominated the Raiders offense by allowing the Raiders to earn just one first down. Tim Brown caught 5 passes for 127 yards, which included an 86-yard pass for his lone touchdown of the game. The play is the Raiders' longest postseason play ever. Running back Napoleon McCallum scored twice, which brought his 1993 postseason touchdown total to five.

== Awards, records, and milestones ==
- Jeff Hostetler, Single Game Record, 424 passing yards, achieved on October 31 against the Chargers. That record was broken when Derek Carr passed for 513 yards against the Tampa Bay Buccaneers in 2016.
- Jeff Jaeger, Single Season Record, Most Field Goals in One Season, 35 and most field goals attempted in a season, 44.
- Jeff Jaeger, Single Season Record, Most Points in One Season, 132. This record would remain a Raider record until the 2010 season.
- Tim Brown recorded his first 1,000 yard receiving season
- Jeff Hostetler became the first Raider since 1979 to pass for over 3,000 yards. He also became just the third Raider at that time to accomplish that feat.
- Defensive end Howie Long retired following the season. In 2000, he entered the Pro Football Hall of Fame.
- Pro Bowl selections:
  - Cornerback Terry McDaniel
  - Wide Receiver Tim Brown
  - Guard Steve Wisniewski
  - Guard Max Montoya
  - Defensive End/Tackle Howie Long.
- This season was so memorable that Raiders.com has devoted three 3 of 27 of its "Fantastic Finishes" stories to the 1993 season. The games that appear are the 12/5 game at Buffalo, the 10/10 game against the Jets and the 1/2/94 game against Denver.
- Tim Brown's 74-yard punt return for a touchdown was the second time that he returned a punt for a touchdown during his career. He would only score one more time on a punt return and that would not occur again until 2001. During the season, Brown became the Raiders all-time leader in punt return yardage by surpassing Neal Colzie. Brown would eventually run his career punt return total to 3,272 yards and 3 touchdowns and a 10.2 average.
- Jeff Hostetler became just the third Raider ever to pass for 3,000 yards in one season. At that time the others were Daryle Lamonica and Ken Stabler. Only five Raider quarterbacks have passed for 3,000 yards or more as a Raider since Hostetler. This includes Rich Gannon (four times), Kerry Collins (twice), Carson Palmer (once), Derek Carr (each of his four seasons thus far) and Jeff George (once). The 1993 playoffs also marked Hostetler's first and only loss as a playoff starter. Hostetler led the Giants to the Super Bowl championship in 1990 going 4–0 and the Raiders in 1993 with a 1–1 record. In five playoff games, he completed 72 of 115 passes (62.6 percent) for 1,034 yards, seven touchdowns, no interceptions, and a 112.0 passer rating while going 4–1.

== Team leaders ==
- Leading Passer Jeff Hostetler, with 3,242 yards & 14 touchdowns
- Leading rusher: Greg Robinson with 591 yards
- Leading receiver: Tim Brown with 80 receptions for 1,180 yards
- Leading scorer: Jeff Jaeger with 132 points
- Sack leader: Anthony Smith with 12.5 sacks
- Leading Tackler: Winston Moss with 102 tackles
- Interception leader: Terry McDaniel with 5 interceptions
