= Marion Butts =

American football player (born 1966)

No. 35, 44
- Position: Running back

Personal information
- Born: August 1, 1966 (age 60); Sylvester, Georgia, U.S.
- Listed height: 6 ft 1 in (1.85 m)
- Listed weight: 248 lb (112 kg)

Career information
- High school: Worth County (GA)
- College: Florida State
- NFL draft: 1989: 7th round, 183rd overall pick

Career history
- San Diego Chargers (1989–1993); New England Patriots (1994); San Francisco 49ers (1995)*; Houston Oilers (1995)
- * Offseason or practice squad member only

Awards and highlights
- Second-team All-Pro (1990); 2× Pro Bowl (1990, 1991)

Career NFL statistics
- Rushing yards: 5,185
- Rushing average: 3.9
- Rushing touchdowns: 43
- Stats at Pro Football Reference

Marion Stevenson Butts Jr. (born August 1, 1966) is an American former professional football player who was a running back for seven seasons in the National Football League (NFL) for the San Diego Chargers, the New England Patriots and the Houston Oilers from 1989 to 1995.

== Professional career ==
Butts was drafted by the San Diego Chargers in the seventh round of the 1989 NFL Draft. He was immediately used as a starter, for the Chargers. On December 17, 1989, late in his rookie season, he rushed for 176 yards against the Kansas City Chiefs on a Chargers record 39 carries. He led the team (Chargers and Patriots) in rushing his first six seasons. He gained a career-best 1,225 yards in 1990, finishing third in the NFL in rushing yards, despite missing the final two games of the season due to injury. He was elected to the 1990 Pro Bowl. In the 1992 playoffs, Butts rushed 15 times for 119 yards and 1 touchdown against the Chiefs, setting the franchise records with 7.9 yards per carry.

In 1994, citing the new salary cap, as well as declining numbers due to a string of injuries, the Chargers traded Butts to the Patriots for a third- and a fifth-round pick.

== NFL career statistics ==
Year	Team	GP	Att	Yds	Avg	Lng	TD	Rec	Yds	Avg	Lng	TD
1989	SD	15	170	683	4.0	50	9	7	21	3.0	8	0
1990	SD	14	265	1,225	4.6	52	8	16	117	7.3	26	0
1991	SD	16	193	834	4.3	44	6	10	91	9.1	46	1
1992	SD	15	218	809	3.7	22	4	9	73	8.1	22	0
1993	SD	16	185	746	4.0	27	4	15	105	7.0	23	0
1994	NE	16	243	703	2.9	26	8	9	54	6.0	15	0
1995	HOU	12	71	185	2.6	9	4	2	10	5.0	10	0
Career		104	1,345	5,185	3.9	52	43	68	471	6.9	46	1
