= Raymond Smoot =

American football player (born 1970)

No. 63
- Position: Guard

Personal information
- Born: July 24, 1970 (age 56); Leesville, Louisiana, U.S.
- Listed height: 6 ft 4 in (1.93 m)
- Listed weight: 305 lb (138 kg)

Career information
- High school: Leesville
- College: LSU (1989–1992)
- NFL draft: 1993: undrafted

Career history
- San Diego Chargers (1993–1994)

Career NFL statistics
- Games played: 2
- Stats at Pro Football Reference

Raymond Eugene Smoot (born July 24, 1970) is an American former professional football guard and who played for the San Diego Chargers of the National Football League (NFL). He played college football for the LSU Tigers.

== Early life ==
Smoot was born on July 24, 1970, in Leesville, Louisiana, where he attended Leesville High School. He was named to the all-state team once and the all-district team three times.

== College career ==
Smoot played college football for the LSU Tigers from 1989 to 1992 and was a four-year letterman. He saw limited playing time at guard and tackle for the team with just six games played as a junior. On February 26, 1992, Smoot was ruled academically ineligible for spring practice. On June 3, Smoot, along with a teammate and two former players were charged with battery over an altercation in a parking on April 24. On June 20, the prosecutors dropped the charges after it was revealed that the accuser challenged them to a fight.

== Professional career ==
After going unselected in the 1993 NFL draft, Smoot signed with the San Diego Chargers as an undrafted free agent. On August 24, he was released by the team. On September 1, Smoot was signed to the practice squad. On December 25, he was elevated to the active roster and played the last two games of the season. On August 10, 1994, he suffered a rib cage injury in practice. On August 28, Smoot was waived by the Chargers. On August 30, he was signed to the practice squad.
