= Duane Young =

American football player (born 1968)

No. 87
- Position: Tight end

Personal information
- Born: May 29, 1968 (age 58); Kalamazoo, Michigan, U.S.
- Listed height: 6 ft 3 in (1.91 m)
- Listed weight: 270 lb (122 kg)

Career information
- High school: Kalamazoo Central
- College: Michigan State
- NFL draft: 1991: 5th round, 123rd overall pick

Career history
- San Diego Chargers (1991–1995); Arizona Cardinals (1996)*; Buffalo Bills (1998)
- * Offseason or practice squad member only

Awards and highlights
- First-team All-Big Ten (1990); Second-team All-Big Ten (1989)

Career NFL statistics
- Receptions: 38
- Receiving yards: 405
- Receiving touchdowns: 3
- Stats at Pro Football Reference

Curtis Duane Young Sr. (born May 29, 1968) is an American former professional football player who was a tight end in the National Football League (NFL). He played college football for the Michigan State Spartans. Young was selected 123rd overall by the San Diego Chargers in the fifth round of the 1991 NFL draft. Young played in the NFL for six seasons with the Chargers (1991–1995) and the Buffalo Bills (1998).

Young is from Kalamazoo, Michigan and is a graduate of Kalamazoo Central High School. Since retiring from the NFL he has coached many high school teams. Most recently he was the head coach at Loy Norrix High School in Kalamazoo.
