= Greg Robinson (running back) =

American football player (born 1969)

No. 28
- Position: Running back

Personal information
- Born: August 7, 1969 (age 57); Grenada, Mississippi, U.S.
- Listed height: 5 ft 10 in (1.78 m)
- Listed weight: 205 lb (93 kg)

Career information
- High school: Grenada (MS)
- College: Louisiana-Monroe
- NFL draft: 1993: 8th round, 206th overall pick

Career history
- Los Angeles Raiders (1993–1994); Green Bay Packers (1995)*; St. Louis Rams (1995–1996); Kansas City Chiefs (1998)*
- * Offseason or practice squad member only

Career NFL statistics
- Rushing yards: 890
- Average: 3.9
- Touchdowns: 2
- Stats at Pro Football Reference

Greg Robinson (born August 7, 1969) is an American former professional football player who played running back for three seasons for the St. Louis Rams and Los Angeles Raiders. He was selected by the Raiders in the eighth round of the 1993 NFL draft. He led the Raiders in rushing in 1993, gaining 591 yards in 12 games, before suffering a serious knee injury against the Buffalo Bills. He sat out the rest of the 1993 season and all of 1994 before coming back with the Rams. Robinson never fully recovered from his knee injury and retired after the 1998 season.

During his career, Robinson rushed for 890 yards and 2 touchdowns. He also added 18 receptions for 160 yards.

Robinson's best games as a professional occurred during three games in November 1993. Over the course of three weeks he rushed for 70 yards against the Chicago Bears, 90 yards against the Kansas City Chiefs, and 89 yards against the San Diego Chargers.

Greg Robinson's lone touchdown as a Los Angeles Raider occurred during the teams week one game against the Minnesota Vikings. His only touchdown as a St. Louis Ram occurred during a 1996 game against the Atlanta Falcons.
