= 1992 San Diego Chargers season =

NFL team 33rd season

- Owner: Alex Spanos
- General manager: Bobby Beathard
- Head coach: Bobby Ross
- Defensive coordinator: Bill Arnsparger
- Home stadium: Jack Murphy Stadium

Results
- Record: 11–5
- Division place: 1st AFC West
- Playoffs: Won Wild Card Playoffs (vs. Chiefs) 17–0; Lost Divisional Playoffs (at Dolphins) 0–31
- All-Pros: 2: CB Gill Byrd (2nd team); LB Junior Seau (1st team)
- Pro Bowlers: 5: CB Gill Byrd; RB Ronnie Harmon; WR Anthony Miller; DE Leslie O'Neal; LB Junior Seau

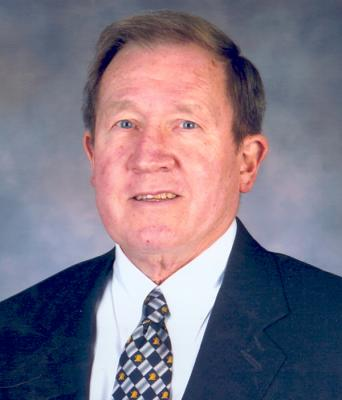
Head coach Bobby Ross led the Chargers to their first playoff appearance in 10 years.

The 1992 San Diego Chargers season was the team's 33rd season, their 32nd in San Diego, and 23rd in the National Football League.

San Diego came into the season off the back of a 4–12 record in 1991, four consecutive losing records, and nine consecutive seasons without making the playoffs. Bobby Ross began his first season as the team's head coach, after having spent the previous five years as a college coach at Georgia Tech. After starting quarterback John Friesz was injured in preseason, the Chargers lost their first four regular season games while being outscored 95–29, but rallied behind replacement quarterback Stan Humphries and a strong defense that featured Pro Bowlers on the defensive line (Leslie O'Neal), at linebacker (Junior Seau), and in the defensive backfield (Gill Byrd). They finished 11–5, clinching the AFC West title and becoming the first NFL team to start 0–4 and still make the playoffs. As of 2026, this feat has yet to be replicated.

During the regular season, the Chargers lost all four of their games against eventual playoff teams, though they did defeat Kansas City 17–0 at Jack Murphy Stadium in the wild card round. In the divisional playoffs they were emphatically beaten by the Miami Dolphins, being eliminated by a 31–0 scoreline.

== Offseason ==
=== Head coaching change ===
Dan Henning, the Chargers' head coach for the previous three seasons, was fired by general manager Bobby Beathard on December 23, 1991, the day after the Chargers completed a 4–12 campaign. Henning had gone 16–32 during his tenure; his entire staff of assistants were also dismissed.

On December 22, Beathard had denied rumours that Georgia Tech Yellow Jackets head coach Bobby Ross was already set to be installed as Henning's replacement. Nonetheless, Ross remained among the favorites for the role. On December 25, Georgia Tech won the Aloha Bowl by a single point; Ross interviewed for the Chargers job on December 30, and was unveiled as head coach on January 2, 1992. Ross' five-year stint in Georgia had seen the Yellow Jackets win a share of the National Championship in 1990. His accomplishments with the Chargers over the next five seasons included a Super Bowl appearance in 1994, and would earn him a place in their Hall of Fame.

Ross appointed Bill Arnsparger as defensive coordinator after Beathard arranged a meeting. Arnsparger, an NFL coach from 1964 to 1983, had been acting as the University of Florida's athletic director. In the early 70s, he had won two Super Bowls with Miami as a defensive coordinator, running their "No-Name" defense, and faced San Diego in the same role in the Epic in Miami a decade later. Arnsparger installed a 4–3 defense, a switch from the 3–4 alignment preferred by his predecessor Ron Lynn.

Other coaching appointees included numerous assistants Ross brought with him from Georgia Tech. Ralph Friedgen, who had also been with Ross in a prior job at Maryland, was installed as running game coordinator and tight ends coach; the post of offensive coordinator went unfilled until Friedgen was promoted to it two seasons later.

=== Players change ===
For the second consecutive year, the Chargers lost 11 players through Plan B free agency. These included Sam Seale, who had started every game at cornerback in 1991, defensive end George Hinkle, a starter in 13 games, and Kitrick Taylor, who had served as both a wide receiver and punt returner. Safety Anthony Shelton was injured during training camp, had shoulder surgery, and missed the entire season, while H-Back Craig McEwen was waived; neither played in the NFL again.

A well-established name on the defensive line also departed after failing to come to contract terms with the Chargers. Joe Phillips had been the Chargers' starting nose tackle the previous season, his fifth with the club. He was a holdout through training camp, asking either for more money or to be traded. On 9 September, he narrowly missed a final deadline to accept a two-year deal, and Beathard announced that negotiations were over. Phillips was released on September 21, and signed for the Chiefs.

On July 27, John Friesz ended a lengthy holdout, signing a two-year deal as the Chargers' starting quarterback. Twelve days later, he suffered a knee injury in the team's preseason opener after a late hit by Ken Harvey. Friesz required surgery for torn knee ligaments and was ruled out for the season, leaving journeyman Bob Gagliano as the only available quarterback with regular-season experience.

In April's NFL draft, Beathard had contacted Washington about the potential trade of a 5th-round draft pick for third-string quarterback Stan Humphries, a player he himself had drafted while serving as Washington's general manager in 1988. That trade fell through, but the parties reached an agreement after Friesz's injury, with Humphries moving to San Diego in exchange for what proved to be a 3rd-round pick in the 1993 draft. The new quarterback was already familiar with the Chargers' offensive system, as Dan Henning had been influential in both San Diego (as head coach) and Washington (as offensive coordinator). Humphries, who had fallen out of favor with Joe Gibbs in Washington, described the move as "a new life for me and a new opportunity". He would start 76 regular season games with the Chargers over the next six seasons, leading them to their only Super Bowl appearance and ultimately earning a place in the Chargers Hall of Fame. (Note: Humphries and Ross were inducted on the same day in 2002.)

Other arrivals included a pair of defensive linemen, Blaise Winter and Shawn Lee. Winter had been with the Chargers for two seasons in the late 1980s, but was unable to find a team in 1991. After winning a spot on the Chargers' roster, he made six sacks during the regular season and was granted the Ed Block Courage Award by his teammates. Lee was a midseason acquisition from Miami, who saw limited action in 1992, but would start 15 games in each of the next three seasons. Cornerback Sean Vanhorse had been unable to get onto the field in his first two seasons in the league, but started nine games in 1992 after the Chargers picked him up through Plan B free agency.

Additions	Subtractions
QB Stan Humphries (Redskins)	C/LS Mark Rodenhauser (Bears)
S Delton Hall (Steelers)	DT Joe Phillips (Chiefs)
	S Martin Bayless (Chiefs)
	S Sam Seale (Raiders)
	WR Kitrick Taylor (Packers)

=== NFL draft ===
San Diego made Tennessee defensive end Chris Mims their first pick in the draft, with Beathard praising the player's pass-rushing ability. Mims produced 10 sacks in his rookie year, and 38 in total during seven seasons with the Chargers.

Other selections made less of an impact in San Diego. Second-round pick Marquez Pope would play in the NFL for ten seasons, but only two of those were with the Chargers, for whom he started only a single game. Their next selection, wide receiver Ray Ethridge, caught only two passes in his career. Fifth-round offensive linemen Curtis Whitley and Eric Jonassen started two games each. Further down the draft, blocking tight end Deems May started six games in his rookie year, and spent five seasons in San Diego.

1992 San Diego Chargers draft
Round	Pick	Player	Position	College	Notes
1	23	Chris Mims	Defensive end	Tennessee	
2	33	Marquez Pope	Cornerback	Fresno State	
3	63	Ray Ethridge	Wide receiver	Pasadena City College	
5	117	Curtis Whitley	Center	Clemson	
5	131	Kevin Little	Linebacker	North Carolina A&T	
5	140	Eric Jonassen	Tackle	Bloomsburg (PA)	
6	147	Reggie White	Defensive tackle	North Carolina A&T	
7	174	Deems May	Tight end	North Carolina	
8	201	James Fuller	Cornerback	Portland State	
9	231	Johnnie Barnes	Wide receiver	Hampton	
10	258	Arthur Paul	Defensive tackle	Arizona State	
11	285	Keith McAfee	Running back	Texas A&M	
12	315	Carlos Huerta	Kicker	Miami (FL)	
Made roster * Made at least one Pro Bowl during career

=== Undrafted free agents ===
1992 undrafted free agents of note
Player	Position	College
Greg Byrne	Wide receiver	Southern Oregon
Chris Collins	Linebacker	SMU
Cecil Doggette	Cornerback	West Virginia
Mitch Kaaialii	Guard	Hawaii
Jimmy Laister	Tackle	Georgia Tech
Tony Lenseigne	Running back	Eastern Washington
Peter Tuipulotu	Running back	BYU
Donald Walkinshaw	Guard	Portland State
Jerelle Williams	Linebacker	Georgia Tech
Wayne Williams	Cornerback	LSU

== Personnel ==
=== Staff ===
1992 San Diego Chargers staff
Front office: Chairman of the board and president – Alex Spanos; Vice chairman – Dean Spanos; General manager – Bobby Beathard; Assistant general manager – Dick Daniels; Director of player personnel – Billy Devaney; Director of pro personnel – Rudy Feldman; Director of college scouting – John Hinek; Coordinator of football operations – Marty Hurney; Head coaches: Head coach – Bobby Ross; Offensive coaches: Quarterbacks/passing game coordinator – Jack Reilly; Tight ends/h-backs/running game coordinator – Ralph Friedgen; Offensive backs – Sylvester Croom; Wide receivers – Jerry Sullivan; Offensive line – Carl Mauck; Quality control – John Misciagna	Defensive coaches: Defensive coordinator – Bill Arnsparger; Defensive line – George O'Leary; Linebackers – Dale Lindsey; Secondary – John Fox; Special teams coaches: Special teams – Chuck Priefer; Special teams and coaching staff assistant – Stan Kwan; Strength and conditioning: Strength and conditioning – John Dunn; Strength and conditioning assistant – Chip Morton

=== Roster ===
1992 San Diego Chargers roster
Quarterbacks (QB): 16 Bob Gagliano; 12 Stan Humphries; 4 Pat O'Hara; Running backs (RB): 82 Rod Bernstine; 32 Eric Bieniemy; 35 Marion Butts; 33 Ronnie Harmon; Wide receivers (WR): 15 Brian Brennan; 80 Shawn Jefferson; 81 Nate Lewis; 83 Anthony Miller; Tight ends (TE): 88 Deems May; 86 Alfred Pupunu; 89 Derrick Walker; 87 Duane Young	Offensive linemen (OL): 67 Leo Goeas RT; 53 Courtney Hall C; 77 Eric Moten G; 65 David Richards G; 72 Harry Swayne LT; 76 Broderick Thompson RT; 64 Curtis Whitley C; 70 Mike Zandofsky G; Defensive linemen (DL): 92 Burt Grossman DE; 98 Shawn Lee DT; 94 Chris Mims DE; 91 Leslie O'Neal DE; 93 George Thornton DT; 96 Blaise Winter DT	Linebackers (LB): 34 Steve Hendrickson MLB; 99 Eugene Marve MLB; 58 Kevin Murphy OLB; 50 Gary Plummer MLB; 57 Henry Rolling OLB; 55 Junior Seau OLB; Defensive backs (DB): 37 Anthony Blaylock CB; 22 Gill Byrd CB; 29 Darren Carrington S; 26 Floyd Fields SS; 27 Donald Frank CB; 36 Delton Hall SS; 30 Marquez Pope CB; 24 Stanley Richard FS; 25 Sean Vanhorse CB; Special teams (ST): 52 Sam Anno LS; 3 John Carney K; 10 John Kidd P	Practice squad: 84 Robert Claiborne WR; 59 Reggie Clark LB; 21 Howard Griffith FB; 71 Eric Jonassen T; 97 Arthur Paul DT; Reserve: 19 Johnnie Barnes WR (IR); 28 Donnie Elder CB (IR); 6 Ray Ethridge WR (PUP); 17 John Friesz QB (IR); 40 James Fuller S (IR); 56 David Grayson LB (PUP); 68 Jarrod Johnson C (IR); 45 Kevin Little LB (IR); 73 Mike Mooney T (IR); 20 Chris Samuels RB (IR); 23 Anthony Shelton S (IR); 54 Billy Ray Smith LB (IR); 43 Peter Tuipulotu RB (IR); 90 Reggie White DT (IR); Rookies in italics 47 active, 14 reserve, 5 practice squad

== Preseason ==
San Diego's preseason began badly, as they were comfortably beaten by Phoenix, and lost starting quarterback Friesz for the year with a knee injury. The Cardinals scored touchdowns on their first three possessions, and led 28–0 before Derrick Walker caught a touchdown pass from Gagliano. Eric Bieniemy scored the Chargers' second touchdown. Gagliano started at quarterback in the next game, completing 7 of 11 for 123 yards; Marion Butts and Bieniemy scored with short rushes as San Diego beat the Patriots.

Against San Francisco, Gagliano completed 8 of 13 for 87 yards, and ran 20 yards for a touchdown. He then gave way to the newly-signed Humphries, who went 5 of 12 for 52 yards and an interception, while leading a drive that Ronnie Harmon capped with a 9-yard touchdown run. Future Charger Mark Seay scored for San Francisco as they won the game with 17 unanswered 4th quarter points. Gagliano was again the starter in the final preseason game against the Rams, leading an 80-yard touchdown drive on the opening possession, with Rod Bernstine scoring from the 1-yard line. Gagliano was 6 of 8 for 90 yards. Humphries took over and completed 11 of 16 for 118 yards, with touchdowns to Harmon and Walter Stanley (the latter of whom was nonetheless cut four days later). John Carney, who had won a training camp battle with Carlos Huerta for the kicking job, converted all three of his field goal attempts.

On August 31, Bobby Ross named Gagliano as his starting quarterback for week 1 of the regular season. He represented the six different opening day starter for the Chargers in as many seasons.

Week	Date	Opponent	Result	Record	Venue	Attendance
1	August 8	at Phoenix Cardinals	L 14–35	0–1	Sun Devil Stadium	28,298
2	August 14	at New England Patriots	W 20–10	1–1	Foxboro Stadium	18,626
3	August 21	San Francisco 49ers	L 14–20	1–2	Jack Murphy Stadium	40,921
4	August 27	Los Angeles Rams	W 30–19	2–2	Jack Murphy Stadium	46,949

== Regular season ==
=== Overview ===
Expectations for the Chargers were not particularly high going into the season. A summary of nine major publications found that four of them had San Diego finishing 4th in their 5-team division, while three placed them 3rd and two 2nd. The low expectations seemed justified as the team lost their first four games, but they improved drastically through the next twelve. This was echoed by the performance of Humphries, who started every game from week 2 onwards: he threw 1 touchdown and 8 interceptions during the 0–4 start, but 15 touchdowns against 10 interceptions the rest of the way. Overall, Humphries had 3,356 passing yards, the most by a Chargers starter since Dan Fouts in 1985. Anthony Miller enjoyed a return to form, crossing 1,000 yards receiving for the first time in three seasons. He ranked 10th in the league for receptions, and 6th for receiving yards, catching 72 passes for 1,060 yards and a team-leading seven touchdowns. Running back Harmon ranked 6th for receptions and 10th for receiving yards, with 79 receptions for 914 yards - he was comfortably the top running back in both categories. Nate Lewis added four touchdowns and over 500 receiving yards.

The Chargers employed a balanced attack that ranked 7th in the league for passing yardage and 9th for rushing (they were 6th overall). Butts led the team with 809 rushing yards. Bernstine had a higher yards per carry than Butts (4.7 to 3.7), but struggled with injuries and only played in nine regular season games. He finished with 499 yards, while Harmon and Bieniemy each contributed over 200. The four running backs combined for 14 rushing touchdowns, and Humphries added four more.

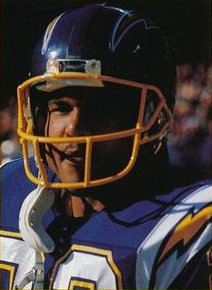
Cornerback Gill Byrd played his tenth and final season in San Diego. He intercepted four passes and was voted to the Pro Bowl.

On defense, the Chargers bounced back from a disappointing showing the previous season, improving from 19th to 4th. With the defensive alignment shifting from 3–4 to 4–3, Leslie O'Neal moved from linebacker to defensive end, and saw his sack count increase from 9 to 17, tied for second-best in the league. This also set an official club record (unofficially, Gary "Big Hands" Johnson had 17 1/2 in 1980). With rookie Mims adding 10 sacks (including a safety), and fellow defensive lineman Burt Grossman adding 8 (including two safeties), the Chargers totalled 51, joint third in the league. They were also second in the league for interceptions. Darren Carrington led the team with 6 interceptions, with Donald Frank and Gill Byrd had 4 each. It proved to be the final season of Byrd's playing career; after making only 11 interceptions in the first half of his ten-season career, he totalled 31 interceptions in his final five seasons in the league, 6 more than any other player during that span. All-Pro linebacker Junior Seau led the team with 102 tackles while adding 4 1/2 sacks.

Kicker Carney was fifth in the league with an 81.3% conversion rate on field goals (he made 26 of 32). This was a return to form after making only 65.5% the previous season. John Kidd was 14th with 42.6 yards per punt.

=== Schedule ===
Week	Date	Opponent	Result	Record	Venue	Attendance
1	September 6	**Kansas City Chiefs**	**L** 10–24	0–1	Jack Murphy Stadium	45,024
2	September 13	at **Denver Broncos**	**L** 13–21	0–2	Mile High Stadium	74,367
3	September 20	Pittsburgh Steelers	**L** 6–23	0–3	Jack Murphy Stadium	46,127
4	September 27	at Houston Oilers	**L** 0–27	0–4	Houston Astrodome	57,491
5	October 4	**Seattle Seahawks**	**W** 17–6	1–4	Jack Murphy Stadium	36,783
6	Bye					
7	October 18	at Indianapolis Colts	**W** 34–14	2–4	Hoosier Dome	48,552
8	October 25	**Denver Broncos**	**W** 24–21	3–4	Jack Murphy Stadium	53,576
9	November 1	Indianapolis Colts	**W** 26–0	4–4	Jack Murphy Stadium	40,324
10	November 8	at **Kansas City Chiefs**	**L** 14–16	4–5	Arrowhead Stadium	72,826
11	November 15	at Cleveland Browns	**W** 14–13	5–5	Cleveland Municipal Stadium	58,396
12	November 22	Tampa Bay Buccaneers	**W** 29–14	6–5	Jack Murphy Stadium	43,197
13	November 29	**Los Angeles Raiders**	**W** 27–3	7–5	Jack Murphy Stadium	59,894
14	December 6	at Phoenix Cardinals	**W** 27–21	8–5	Sun Devil Stadium	26,880
15	December 13	Cincinnati Bengals	**W** 27–10	9–5	Jack Murphy Stadium	50,579
16	December 20	at **Los Angeles Raiders**	**W** 36–14	10–5	Los Angeles Memorial Coliseum	40,152
17	December 27	at **Seattle Seahawks**	**W** 31–14	11–5	Kingdome	49,324
Note: Intra-division opponents are in **bold** text.

=== Game summaries ===
All game reports use the Pro Football Researchers' gamebook archive as a source.

==== Week 1: vs. Kansas City Chiefs ====
Week One: Kansas City Chiefs at San Diego Chargers – Game summary

Quarter	1	2	3	4	Total
Chiefs	7	3	7	7	**24**
Chargers	3	0	0	7	**10**

at Jack Murphy Stadium, San Diego, California

- Date: September 6
- Game time: 1:00 p.m. PDT
- Game weather: 70 °F (21.1 °C), relative humidity 77%, wind 10 mph
- Game attendance: 45,024
- Referee: Howard Roe
- TV announcers (NBC): Dick Enberg and Bob Trumpy
- Box score

Game information

**First quarter**

- KAN – Dale Carter 46-yard punt return (Nick Lowery kick), 13:21. Chiefs 7–0.
- SDG – John Carney 45-yard field goal, 1:33. Chiefs 7–3. **Drive: 11 plays, 44 yards, 5:16.**

**Second quarter**

- KAN – Nick Lowery 21-yard field goal, 4:59. Chiefs 10–3. **Drive: 11 plays, 45 yards, 6:11.**

**Third quarter**

- KAN – Kevin Ross 99-yard interception return (Nick Lowery kick), 1:53. Chiefs 17–3.

**Fourth quarter**

- SDG – Rod Bernstine 2-yard run (John Carney kick), 10:24. Chiefs 17–10. **Drive: 7 plays, 68 yards, 3:07.**
- KAN – Barry Word 1-yard run (Nick Lowery kick), 1:23. Chiefs 24–10. **Drive: 15 plays, 76 yards, 9:01.**

**Top passers**

- KAN – Dave Krieg – 15/25, 154 yards, INT
- SDG – Stan Humphries – 7/10, 62 yards, INT

**Top rushers**

- KAN – Barry Word – 18 rushes, 37 yards, TD
- SDG – Rod Bernstine – 10 rushes, 45 yards, TD

**Top receivers**

- KAN – J. J. Birden – 3 receptions, 30 yards
- SDG – Ronnie Harmon – 6 receptions, 44 yards

Harmon miscontrolled the opening kickoff out of bounds at the 2-yard line, forcing the offense to start from there. After three plays netted six yards, Kidd's punt was returned 46 yards for a touchdown by Dale Carter 99 seconds into the game. Later in the opening quarter, San Diego was the beneficiary of a roughing the kicker penalty, extending a drive after they'd been forced to punt. After Miller caught a 17-yard pass from Gagliano, the drive stalled for a second time and Carney kicked a 45-yard field goal. Gagliano was sacked on consecutive 2nd-quarter plays, again forcing Kidd to punt from deep in his own territory. The Chiefs took possession at the San Diego 48, and gained 8 yards on three plays before Dave Krieg drew Winter offside with a hard count on 4th and 2. Kansas City added a field goal later on in the drive and led 10–3 at the break.

In the 3rd quarter, Seau stopped one drive with an interception and another by sacking Krieg at his own 6-yard line. After Kansas City punted, San Diego started its next drive at the Chiefs 36, and reached a 3rd and 4 at the 13. Gagliano's pass was then tipped away from Harmon by former Charger Martin Bayless for Kevin Ross to intercept and return 99 yards for a touchdown. Humphries then entered the game; on his second drive, he completed 4 of 4 passes for 36 yards, with a defensive pass interference penalty accounting for a further 27 yards. Bernstine finished the drive with a 2-yard run, drawing San Diego back within seven points with 10:24 to play. Kansas City responded with a 15-play, 76-yard drive, converting three third downs and running the clock down to 1:23, with Barry Word scoring the clinching touchdown.

The Chargers held Kansas City to 188 yards, but gained a season-low 155 yards. Humphries completed 7 of 10 passes, for 62 yards and an interception. Gagliano was 7 of 20 for 55 yards and two interceptions. He was also sacked 5 times for a combined loss of 50 yards. It was the last start of Gagliano's career, as Humphries was given the starting job in week 2 and kept it for the rest of the season.

==== Week 2: at Denver Broncos ====
Week Two: San Diego Chargers at Denver Broncos – Game summary

Quarter	1	2	3	4	Total
Chargers	0	10	3	0	**13**
Broncos	7	0	14	0	**21**

at Mile High Stadium, Denver, Colorado

- Date: September 13
- Game time: 2:00 p.m. MDT
- Game weather: 74 °F (23.3 °C), relative humidity 28%, wind 11 mph
- Game attendance: 74,367
- Referee: Dick Hantak
- TV announcers (NBC): Don Criqui and Paul Maguire
- Box score

Game information

**First quarter**

- DEN – Mark Jackson 32-yard pass from John Elway (David Treadwell kick), 10:00. Broncos 7–0. **Drive: 8 plays, 80 yards, 5:00.**

**Second quarter**

- SDG – John Carney 20-yard field goal, 1:34. Broncos 7–3. **Drive: 15 plays, 77 yards, 8:43.**
- SDG – Nate Lewis 2-yard pass from Stan Humphries (John Carney kick), 0:28. Chargers 10–7. **Drive: 2 plays, 16 yards, 0:30.**

**Third quarter**

- DEN – John Elway 8-yard run (David Treadwell kick), 10:35. Broncos 14–10. **Drive: 7 plays, 64 yards, 2:58.**
- SDG – John Carney 27-yard field goal, 2:28. Broncos 14–13. **Drive: 10 plays, 55 yards, 4:46.**
- DEN – Shannon Sharpe 34-yard pass from John Elway (David Treadwell kick), 0:25. Broncos 21–13. **Drive: 1 play, 34 yards, 0:06.**

**Fourth quarter**

- No scoring plays.

**Top passers**

- SDG – Stan Humphries – 23/45, 231 yards, TD, 2 INT
- DEN – John Elway – 14/24, 186 yards, 2 TD, INT

**Top rushers**

- SDG – Rod Bernstine – 12 rushes, 83 yards
- DEN – Gaston Green – 11 rushes, 21 yards
  DEN – Reggie Rivers – 4 rushes, 21 yards

**Top receivers**

- SDG – Ronnie Harmon – 7 receptions, 91 yards
- DEN – Shannon Sharpe – 3 receptions, 61 yards, TD

Denver took the opening kickoff and drove 80 yards in 8 plays, scoring on John Elway's 32-yard touchdown pass to Mark Jackson with Byrd beaten on the play. An answering 60-yard drive by San Diego came to nothing when Carney's 37-yard field goal attempt was blocked. In the 2nd quarter, San Diego drove 77 yards in 15 plays; Bernstine had 3 carries for 34 yards as the Chargers reached a 3rd and 1 from the Denver 2, but he was then stuffed for a loss of a yard, and Carney came on to kick a short field goal with 1:34 remaining in the first half. Three plays later, Byrd intercepted a deep pass from Elway, and returned the ball 44 yards from his own 40-yard line to the Denver 16. A touchdown run by Harmon on the next play was wiped out by the first of two successive penalties, but Harmon's one-handed 29-yard reception moved the ball to the 2, from where Lewis caught Humphries' first Chargers touchdown pass with 24 seconds on the clock.

Leading 10–7, the Chargers allowed a touchdown on Denver's first second-half possession, this time on Elway's 8-yard run. The Chargers pulled back to within a point late in the quarter with a Carney field goal, then forced a three-and-out and took over at their own 19. Humphries was intercepted on the next play, and Elway threw a 34-yard touchdown pass to Shannon Sharpe on the play after that. The Chargers crossed midfield on all four of their 4th quarter possessions, but the drives ended with two punts, an interception and the clock expiring.

Bernstine rushed for 83 yards and Butts for 78 as San Diego gained 168 yards on the ground. A third running back, Harmon, led the team in receiving yards with 91 from 7 catches. Humphries threw for 231 yards, but the Chargers again gave up five sacks, this time for a loss of 44 yards.

==== Week 3: vs. Pittsburgh Steelers ====
Week Three: Pittsburgh Steelers at San Diego Chargers – Game summary

Quarter	1	2	3	4	Total
Steelers	0	7	0	16	**23**
Chargers	3	3	0	0	**6**

at Jack Murphy Stadium, San Diego, California

- Date: September 20
- Game time: 1:00 p.m. PDT
- Game weather: 70 °F (21.1 °C), relative humidity 80%, wind 8 mph
- Game attendance: 46,127
- Referee: Pat Haggerty
- TV announcers (NBC): Charlie Jones and Todd Christensen
- Box score

Game information

**First quarter**

- SDG – John Carney 24-yard field goal, 0:03. Chargers 3–0. **Drive: 13 plays, 71 yards, 8:08.**

**Second quarter**

- PIT – Adrian Cooper 24-yard pass from Neil O'Donnell (Gary Anderson kick), 1:56. Steelers 7–3. **Drive: 4 plays, 80 yards, 1:59.**
- SDG – John Carney 43-yard field goal, 0:03. Steelers 7–6. **Drive: 8 plays, 55 yards, 1:40.**

**Third quarter**

- No scoring plays.

**Fourth quarter**

- PIT – Dwight Stone 6-yard pass from Neil O'Donnell (kick failed), 7:47. Steelers 13–6. **Drive: 12 plays, 80 yards, 6:34.**
- PIT – Neil O'Donnell 1-yard run (Gary Anderson kick), 7:47. Steelers 20–6. **Drive: 5 plays, 18 yards, 3:02.**
- PIT – Gary Anderson 42-yard field goal, 7:47. Steelers 23–6. **Drive: 4 plays, -9 yards, 1:11.**

**Top passers**

- PIT – Neil O'Donnell – 17/24, 215 yards, 2 TD, INT
- SDG – Stan Humphries – 13/29, 151 yards, 2 INT

**Top rushers**

- PIT – Barry Foster – 21 rushes, 36 yards
- SDG – Rod Bernstine – 11 rushes, 65 yards

**Top receivers**

- PIT – Dwight Stone – 5 receptions, 69 yards, TD
- SDG – Ronnie Harmon – 3 receptions, 77 yards

San Diego took the opening kickoff and converted three third downs, one of those with Miller's diving 35-yard reception. Lewis appeared to have opened the scoring with an 11-yard touchdown catch, but Swayne was flagged for illegal motion, and the Chargers settled for a Carney field goal. In the 2nd quarter, the Steelers drove 80 yards in just 4 plays, taking the lead with a Neil O'Donnell touchdown pass. Late in the half, Humphries completed three consecutive passes for 39 yards, but took a blow to the ankle after the third of these and came out of the game.. Gagliano came in and completed his first pass, but the drive stalled and Carney made a 43-yard kick with 1:18 on the clock. Pittsburgh tried to move into field goal range, but Frank intercepted O'Donnell, and the Chargers took over at their own 34 with time for one more play. Gagliano's Hail Mary pass was batted in the air and caught by Harmon for a 55-yard gain, but the Steelers were able to tackle him 11 yards short of the end zone, preserving their 7–6 lead at the intermission.

Gagliano was intercepted on the Chargers' first possession of the second half; Greg Lloyd ran the ball back from his own 45-yard line to the San Diego 20, but Swayne knocked the ball loose at the end of the return and Butts recovered. San Diego punted, and Pittsburgh lost another fumble on the next play, Henry Rolling knocking the ball from Barry Foster's grasp for Byrd to recover. With Humphries back in at quarterback, Bernstine had a 15-yard carry and the Chargers advanced 30 yards to a 4th and 2 at the Pittsburgh 8, before sending Carney in for a go-ahead field goal attempt of 25 yards. Carney pulled his attempt wide to the left, and the game quickly shifted Pittsburgh's way. O'Donnell led an 80-yard touchdown drive, Humphries was intercepted on the next play, and O'Donnell ran for a score five plays later. The Steelers later added a field goal, and Humphries was intercepted a second time in the final minutes.

Harmon was again the leading receiver, with 3 catches for 77 yards (he also ran 3 times for 17 yards). San Diego outgained Pittsburgh 330–272 but was hampered by 10 penalties for 90 yards.

==== Week 4: at Houston Oilers ====
Week Four: San Diego Chargers at Houston Oilers – Game summary

Quarter	1	2	3	4	Total
Chargers	0	0	0	0	**0**
Oilers	10	0	7	10	**27**

at Astrodome, Houston, Texas

- Date: September 27
- Game time: 12:00 p.m. CDT
- Game weather: N/A (game played indoors)
- Game attendance: 57,491
- Referee: Gerald Austin
- TV announcers (NBC): Joel Meyers and Dan Hampton
- Box score

Game information

**First quarter**

- HOU – Haywood Jeffires 3-yard pass from Warren Moon (Al Del Greco kick), 9:17. Oilers 7–0. **Drive: 9 play, 80 yards, 5:43.**
- HOU – Al Del Greco 49-yard field goal, 6:30. Oilers 10–0. **Drive: 5 plays, 11 yards, 1:01.**

**Second quarter**

- No scoring plays.

**Third quarter**

- HOU – Lorenzo White 5-yard run (Al Del Greco kick), 4:17. Oilers 17–0. **Drive: 12 plays, 86 yards, 5:57.**

**Fourth quarter**

- HOU – Warren Moon 5-yard run (Al Del Greco kick), 12:24. Oilers 24–0. **Drive: 7 plays, 37 yards, 3:43.**
- HOU – Al Del Greco 46-yard field goal, 6:27. Oilers 27–0. **Drive: 9 plays, 44 yards, 4:58.**

**Top passers**

- SDG – Stan Humphries – 22/38, 219 yards, 3 INT
- HOU – Warren Moon – 17/28, 175 yards, TD

**Top rushers**

- SDG – Rod Bernstine – 9 rushes, 22 yards
- HOU – Lorenzo White – 5 rushes, 63 yards, TD

**Top receivers**

- SDG – Ronnie Harmon – 4 receptions, 78 yards
- HOU – Haywood Jeffires – 10 receptions, 77 yards, TD

As they had in their first two games, the Chargers gave up a touchdown on their opponent's first drive, Warren Moon leading an 80-yard drive and finishing it with a 3-yard pass to Haywood Jeffires. The Oilers added a field goal on their next possession. San Diego then converted three third downs in a row, moving from its own 22 to a 3rd and 1 from the Houston 30; Butts and Bernstine were stopped for no gain on back-to-back plays, turning the ball over on downs. On their next drive, they picked up four first downs in moving from their own 2-yard line to a 3rd and 1 at the Houston 39 - this time, Bernstine was stopped for the loss of a yard, and the Chargers elected to punt.

The Chargers were still in the game entering the 3rd quarter, trailing 10–0. However, they punted on their first three possessions of the second half, and Houston responded with two touchdowns and a field goal. San Diego's best chance to avoid the shutout came with five minutes left, after Harmon's 32-yard catch gave the Chargers a 1st and goal at the Oilers 4-yard line. After two incompletions and a run for no gain, Humphries threw his second interception on the day. A third followed in the final seconds.

San Diego dropped to 0–4 and was shut out for the first time in four seasons. Having gone six consecutive quarters without a point and ten without a touchdown, San Diego was already three games behind the division-leading Broncos and Chiefs. This latest one-sided defeat drew negative reviews from the Californian press, with the Los Angeles Times giving them a report card with six F grades out of nine, while the North County Times described them as potentially the league's worst team.

==== Week 5: vs. Seattle Seahawks ====
Week Five: Seattle Seahawks at San Diego Chargers – Game summary

Quarter	1	2	3	4	Total
Seahawks	0	3	3	0	**6**
Chargers	10	7	0	0	**17**

at Jack Murphy Stadium, San Diego, California

- Date: October 4
- Game time: 1:00 p.m. PDT
- Game weather: 68 °F (20.0 °C), relative humidity 73%, wind 7 mph
- Game attendance: 36,783
- Referee: Johnny Grier
- TV announcers (NBC): Don Criqui and Paul Maguire
- Box score

Game information

**First quarter**

- SDG – Anthony Miller 67-yard pass from Stan Humphries (John Carney kick), 12:24. Chargers 7–0. **Drive: 5 plays, 81 yards, 2:36.**
- SDG – John Carney 49-yard field goal, 3:48. Chargers 10–0. **Drive: 9 plays, 34 yards, 6:55.**

**Second quarter**

- SEA – John Kasay 27-yard field goal, 11:37. Chargers 10–3. **Drive: 15 plays, 70 yards, 7:11.**
- SDG – Anthony Miller 5-yard pass from Stan Humphries (John Carney kick), 0:12. Chargers 17–3. **Drive: 8 plays, 31 yards, 2:09.**

**Third quarter**

- SEA – John Kasay 29-yard field goal, 2:02. Chargers 17–6. **Drive: 5 plays, 53 yards, 3:17.**

**Fourth quarter**

- No scoring plays.

**Top passers**

- SEA – Dan McGwire – 12/21, 70 yards, 3 INT
- SDG – Stan Humphries – 15/28, 200 yards, 2 TD

**Top rushers**

- SEA – Chris Warren – 13 rushes, 76 yards
- SDG – Rod Bernstine – 18 rushes, 74 yards

**Top receivers**

- SEA – John L. Williams – 7 receptions, 51 yards
- SDG – Anthony Miller – 9 receptions, 142 yards, 2 TD

On the fifth play of the game, San Diego had a 2nd and 10 at its own 33. Humphries found Miller racing along the left sideline, the receiver catching the ball in stride at the Seattle 40 and outpacing the defense to score. After forcing a punt, the Chargers moved into field goal range with back-to-back receptions of 14 and 19 yards by Miller and Lewis. Humphries then fumbled while being sacked on third down, but Leo Goeas recovered, allowing Carney to extend the lead with a 49-yard kick. The Seahawks responded with a 15-play, 70-yard drive that ended with a John Kasay field goal. The following Chargers drive was extended by an illegal contact penalty as Humphries threw incomplete on fourth down, but San Diego came up empty-handed when Carney missed a 34-yard kick. Late in the half, Anthony Blaylock intercepted Seattle's backup quarterback Dan McGwire at the Seattle 31-yard line to set up another scoring chance. Four consecutive carries by Bernstine moved the ball to the 7; Humphries was then sacked before twice throwing incomplete, but an illegal use of hands penalty gave the Chargers a fresh set of downs, and Humphries found Miller for a 5-yard touchdown two plays later, making the score 17–3 with 12 seconds remaining in the half.

The Chargers offense was less effective in the second half, with their first two possessions both three-and-outs. For the Seahawks, Chris Warren's 52-yard carry set up a field goal late in the 3rd quarter. Carney missed another field goal on the next drive, coming up short on a 51-yarder, but Seattle failed to cross midfield on its final four drives.

Miller finished with 9 catches for 142 yards and two touchdowns, accounting for the majority of Humphries' 200 passing yards. San Diego's defense allowed only 70 net passing yards, while collecting four sacks and three interceptions.

==== Week 7: at Indianapolis Colts ====
Week Seven: San Diego Chargers at Indianapolis Colts – Game summary

Quarter	1	2	3	4	Total
Chargers	14	0	3	17	**34**
Colts	7	0	7	0	**14**

at Hoosier Dome, Indianapolis, Indiana

- Date: October 18
- Game time: 1:00 p.m. EDT
- Game weather: N/A (game played indoors)
- Game attendance: 48,552
- Referee: Howard Roe
- TV announcers (NBC): Don Criqui and Paul Maguire
- Box score

Game information

**First quarter**

- SDG – Rod Bernstine 25-yard run (John Carney kick), 9:48. Chargers 7–0. **Drive: 8 play, 81 yards, 5:12.**
- SDG – Rod Bernstine 2-yard run (John Carney kick), 6:18. Chargers 14–0. **Drive: 3 play, 68 yards, 1:39.**
- IND – Anthony Johnson 8 yard pass from Jeff George (Dean Biasucci kick), 1:37. Chargers 14–7. **Drive: 11 plays, 80 yards, 4:41.**

**Second quarter**

- No scoring plays.

**Third quarter**

- SDG – John Carney 23-yard field goal, 12:20. Chargers 17–7. **Drive: 6 plays, 14 yards, 2:20.**
- IND – William Schultz 3-yard pass from Jeff George (Dean Biasucci kick), 2:00. Chargers 17–14. **Drive: 5 plays, 38 yards, 2:55.**

**Fourth quarter**

- SDG – Eric Bieniemy 2-yard run (John Carney kick), 13:13. Chargers 24–14. **Drive: 7 plays, 80 yards, 3:47.**
- SDG – Stan Humphries 2-yard run (John Carney kick), 10:40. Chargers 31–14. **Drive: 2 plays, 10 yards, 0:50.**
- SDG – John Carney 27-yard field goal, 1:07. Chargers 34–14. **Drive: 9 plays, 38 yards, 6:08.**

**Top passers**

- SDG – Stan Humphries – 12/17, 205 yards, INT
- IND – Jeff George – 27/39, 318 yards, 2 TD, 2 INT

**Top rushers**

- SDG – Rod Bernstine – 23 rushes, 150 yards, 2 TD
- IND – Ken Clark – 6 rushes, 28 yards

**Top receivers**

- SDG – Nate Lewis – 3 receptions, 94 yards
- IND – Jessie Hester – 8 receptions, 105 yards

After taking the opening kickoff, San Diego drove 81 yards on 8 plays without facing a third down. Bernstine scored from the 25, hurdling the final potential tackler on his way to the end zone. After the Colts went three-and-out, Humphries immediately aimed a long pass at Lewis, who caught the ball and gained 62 yards before being brought down at the Colt 6. Bernstine ran for 4 and 2 yards on the next two plays, and the Chargers led 14–0 less than nine minutes into the game. After Jeff George's first touchdown pass, San Diego responded by driving into Colt territory, but Bernstine fumbled and Quentin Coryatt recovered at his own 28. Following an exchange of punts, Indianapolis drove from its own 20 to a 3rd and goal at the Charger 3, whereupon Carrington intercepted a misplaced George pass in the end zone. San Diego crossed midfield before Humphries, too, was intercepted. The Colts moved into field goal range, but Dean Biasucci was wide left with 14 seconds left in the half.

The turnovers continued in the second half, with Rolling forcing a fumble that Gary Plummer recovered at the Colts 20, setting up Carney's 23-yard field goal. George quickly led his team to a 1st and goal from the 8, but Carrington claimed his second end zone interception. On their next drive, San Diego committed its third turnover in opposition territory, Humphries fumbling when sacked. This time, George capitalized with his second touchdown pass of the game. San Diego came straight back with an 80-yard, 7-play touchdown drive. Bernstine carried four times for 39 yards, and Bieniemy scored his first career touchdown from the 2-yard line early in the final quarter. Byrd intercepted George early in the next drive, returning it 20 yards for an apparent touchdown. A penalty on Sean Vanhorse wiped out the score, but O'Neal recovered a fumble two plays later, and Humphries ran in a touchdown two plays later. A further fumble, caused by Mims's sack on George, was recovered by Rolling. That set up a Carney field goal for the game's final points.

Bernstine had 23 carries for 150 yards (this would stand as the best total of his career), with two touchdowns. However, he left late in the game with a shoulder dislocation, and spent the next seven games on injured reserve. San Diego committed three turnovers, the Colts five.

==== Week 8: vs. Denver Broncos ====
Week Eight: Denver Broncos at San Diego Chargers – Game summary

Quarter	1	2	3	4	Total
Broncos	0	7	0	14	**21**
Chargers	7	0	14	3	**24**

at Jack Murphy Stadium, San Diego, California

- Date: October 25
- Game time: 1:00 p.m. PST
- Game weather: 67 °F (19.4 °C), relative humidity 76%, wind 8 mph
- Game attendance: 53,576
- Referee: Jerry Markbreit
- TV announcers (NBC): Dick Enberg and Bob Trumpy
- Box score

Game information

**First quarter**

- SDG – Anthony Miller 38-yard pass from Stan Humphries (John Carney kick), 2:21. Chargers 7–0. **Drive: 4 plays, 52 yards, 2:25.**

**Second quarter**

- DEN – Mark Jackson 32-yard pass from John Elway (David Treadwell kick), 1:29. Tied 7–7. **Drive: 8 plays, 80 yards, 3:29.**

**Third quarter**

- SDG – Stan Humphries 2-yard run (John Carney kick), 7:48. Chargers 14–7. **Drive: 5 plays, 92 yards, 2:27.**
- SDG – Derrick Walker 27-yard pass from Stan Humphries (John Carney kick), 5:42. Chargers 21–7. **Drive: 3 plays, 32 yards, 0:58.**

**Fourth quarter**

- DEN – John Elway 5-yard run (David Treadwell kick), 13:47. Chargers 21–14. **Drive: 15 plays, 80 yards, 6:55.**
- SDG – John Carney 37-yard field goal, 6:35. Chargers 24–14. **Drive: 4 plays, -2 yards, 1:29.**
- DEN – Mark Jackson 28-yard pass from John Elway (David Treadwell kick), 5:03. Chargers 24–21. **Drive: 6 plays, 65 yards, 1:32.**

**Top passers**

- DEN – John Elway – 21/39, 260 yards, 2 TD, 3 INT
- SDG – Stan Humphries – 20/27, 355 yards, 2 TD, INT

**Top rushers**

- DEN – Arthur Marshall – 3 rushes, 28 yards
- SDG – Marion Butts – 20 rushes, 74 yards

**Top receivers**

- DEN – Mark Jackson – 5 receptions, 113 yards, 2 TD
- SDG – Anthony Miller – 6 receptions, 129 yards, TD

After the first ten minutes of the game were scoreless, Bieniemy's 16-yard punt return set the Chargers up at their own 48. Humphries completed passes of 22 yards to Walker and 38 yards to Miller, the latter for a touchdown. San Diego crossed midfield on its next two possessions, but turned the ball over both times: first, Humphries and Butts misplayed the exchange on an attempted handoff, with Denver recovering the loose ball; later, a Humphries bomb was intercepted at the goal line. After the second of these, Denver drove 80 yards to tie the score on John Elway's 32-yard pass to Mark Jackson. A 30-yard reception by Lewis helped move the Chargers into field goal range, but Carney was wide left as time expired in the half.

On their first possession of the 3rd quarter, the Chargers faced a 3rd and 1 on their own 17. Humphries converted with a 22-yard pass to Miller, immediately followed by a 59-yard connection with Walker, who was eventually brought down on the Denver 2-yard line. On the next play, Humphries dropped the ball in the backfield, but recovered it himself and rushed up the middle for an improvised touchdown. Two plays later, Byrd intercepted Elway and returned the ball 14 yards to the Denver 32. The Chargers were backed up by a penalty, but Humphries found Harmon for 18 yards and followed up with a 27-yard touchdown to Walker; it was the Chargers' second score in a span of 2:06. Elway attempted passes on 12 out of 15 plays on the next drive, leading his team 80 yards and scoring himself from 5 yards out. Kidd pinned Denver inside its own 10 with nine minutes remaining; three plays later, Byrd pulled in a deflected pass for his second interception of the game, his 10-yard return to the Denver 17 setting up a Carney field goal. Elway passed on the next six plays from scrimmage, completing 4 for 65 yards and another touchdown to Jackson. Three plays later Bieniemy fumbled, giving Denver the ball at the Charger 34, with 3:18 to play. On the next play Blaylock got ahead of Jackson on a fly route for an end zone interception; the turnover stood despite one of Blaylock's feet coming down out of bounds, as he was controversially ruled to have been forced out by Jackson. Humphries then converted a 3rd and 11 with a 12-yard completion to Harmon, Butts picked up a further first down, and the Chargers ran the clock out.

Humphries had his first 300-yard passing game, completing 20 of 27 for 355 yards, with two touchdowns and an interception. Miller had 6 catches for 129 yards and a touchdown, while Walker had 4 catches for 104 yards and a touchdown, the lone 100-yard receiving game of his career. Byrd's two interceptions gave him nine against Elway in his career.

==== Week 9: vs. Indianapolis Colts ====
Week Nine: Indianapolis Colts at San Diego Chargers – Game summary

Quarter	1	2	3	4	Total
Colts	0	0	0	0	**0**
Chargers	0	5	14	7	**26**

at Jack Murphy Stadium, San Diego, California

- Date: November 1
- Game time: 1:00 p.m. PST
- Game weather: 66 °F (18.9 °C), relative humidity 65%, wind 9 mph
- Game attendance: 40,324
- Referee: Pat Haggerty
- TV announcers (NBC): Charlie Jones and Todd Christensen
- Box score

Game information

**First quarter**

- No scoring plays.

**Second quarter**

- SDG – Safety, Burt Grossman sacked Jeff George in end zone, 10:32. Chargers 2–0.
- SDG – John Carney 33-yard field goal, 5:39. Chargers 5–0. **Drive: 8 plays, 50 yards, 4:53.**

**Third quarter**

- SDG – Nate Lewis 17-yard pass from Stan Humphries (John Carney kick), 8:02. Chargers 12–0. **Drive: 7 plays, 76 yards, 4:53.**
- SDG – Nate Lewis 9-yard pass from Stan Humphries (John Carney kick), 1:35. Chargers 19–0. **Drive: 9 plays, 69 yards, 5:19.**

**Fourth quarter**

- SDG – Marion Butts 3-yard run (John Carney kick), 4:18. Chargers 26–0. **Drive: 6 plays, 32 yards, 3:44.**

**Top passers**

- IND – Jack Trudeau – 5/11, 61 yards
- SDG – Stan Humphries – 22/33, 256 yards, 2 TD, 2 INT

**Top rushers**

- IND – Anthony Johnson – 11 rushes, 28 yards
- SDG – Marion Butts – 27 rushes, 118 yards, TD

**Top receivers**

- IND – Jessie Hester – 3 receptions, 34 yards
- SDG – Anthony Miller – 6 receptions, 105 yards

San Diego's offense moved the ball freely in the first half, but missed several scoring opportunities. Humphries was intercepted in Colts territory on their first drive, and sacked near midfield to force a punt on the next one. With Indianapolis failing to gain a first down on its first two possessions, the Chargers drove to within a yard of the end zone, only for Butts to fumble as he dove over the goal line with the Colts recovering. Three plays later, Grossman broke through the line and sacked Jeff George in the end zone for a safety. After the ensuing free kick, a 43-yard catch by Miller set up a 33-yard field goal by Carney. The Colts picked up their first two first downs of the game on the next possession, but back-to-back sacks by O'Neal and Winter forced another punt. The Chargers led just 5–0 at halftime, despite outgaining the Colts by 203 yards to -5.

The offense managed to score a pair of touchdowns in the 3rd quarter. First, Harmon had a pair of 15-yard receptions on a 76-yard drive; from the Colts 17, Humphries lofted a pass to Lewis in the far left corner of the end zone. Harmon added a 20-yard reception on the next drive, which went 69 yards and ended with Humphries finding Lewis in the same corner for a 9-yard touchdown. In the final quarter, Stanley Richard intercepted a tipped George pass to set up a 3-yard Butts touchdown with 4:18 to play. Indianapolis then had its best drive of the game, moving from its own 1-yard line to the Chargers 18 before another Grossman sack forced a fumble that George Thornton recovered, clinching the Chargers' first shutout win since 1986.

The Colts mustered only eight first downs (five of these came on their final drive), and 99 total yards (68 on the final drive). Indianapolis quarterbacks were sacked seven times. The 99 yards were the fewest a Charger defense had given up since 1961. The Chargers offense picked up 398 yards and 26 first downs, while holding the ball for 42:24. Butts rushed 27 times for 118 yards and a touchdown, while Miller had 6 catches for 105 yards.

==== Week 10: at Kansas City Chiefs ====
Week Ten: San Diego Chargers at Kansas City Chiefs – Game summary

Quarter	1	2	3	4	Total
Chargers	0	0	7	7	**14**
Chiefs	3	10	0	3	**16**

at Arrowhead Stadium, Kansas City, Missouri

- Date: November 8
- Game time: 3:00 p.m. CST
- Game weather: 43 °F (6.1 °C), relative humidity 72%, wind 18 mph
- Game attendance: 72,826
- Referee: Bernie Kukar
- TV announcers (NBC): Joel Meyers and Beasley Reece
- Box score

Game information

**First quarter**

- KAN – Nick Lowery 47-yard field goal, 4:42. Chiefs 3–0. **Drive: 13 plays, 32 yards, 7:41.**

**Second quarter**

- KAN – Christian Okoye 2-yard run (Nick Lowery kick), 14:57. Chiefs 10–0. **Drive: 5 plays, 15 yards, 2:20.**
- KAN – Nick Lowery 35-yard field goal, 1:11. Chiefs 13–0. **Drive: 4 plays, 5 yards, 1:10.**

**Third quarter**

- SDG – Derrick Walker 14-yard pass from Stan Humphries (John Carney kick), 2:55. Chiefs 13–7. **Drive: 8 plays, 80 yards, 3:59.**

**Fourth quarter**

- SDG – Marion Butts 1-yard run (John Carney kick), 13:28. Chargers 14–13. **Drive: 9 plays, 90 yards, 2:35.**
- KAN – Nick Lowery 36-yard field goal, 0:54. Chiefs 16–14. **Drive: 7 plays, 49 yards, 2:24.**

**Top passers**

- SDG – Stan Humphries – 20/35, 294 yards, TD, INT
- KAN – Dave Krieg – 10/28, 114 yards

**Top rushers**

- SDG – Marion Butts – 17 rushes, 37 yards, TD
- KAN – Christian Okoye – 19 rushes, 38 yards, TD

**Top receivers**

- SDG – Ronnie Harmon – 7 receptions, 96 yards
- KAN – Willie Davis – 2 receptions, 36 yards

The Chiefs led 3–0 in the opening quarter when Derrick Thomas sacked Humphries, forcing a fumble that Thomas recovered himself on the Chargers 15. Christian Okoye scored five plays later. In the 2nd quarter, Thomas stopped another drive with a third down sack. The Chargers forced a punt and moved to the Chiefs 47, from where a Humphries bomb was brought in by Lewis for an apparent touchdown. However, Broderick Thompson was flagged for holding, negating the score. Thomas then picked up his third and fourth sacks of the half on consecutive plays, forcing another fumble that the Chiefs recovered. Following a Nick Lowery field goal, Kansas City led 13–0 at the break.

The Chargers offense improved in the second half. On their second possession, they drove 80 yards in 8 plays for a touchdown. Walker had 3 catches for 41 yards on the drive, scoring from the 14-yard line. After forcing a punt, San Diego had another long touchdown drive, this time 90 yards in 9 plays. Humphries hit Jefferson in stride up the right sideline for 51 yards to move into Chiefs territory, converted a 3rd and 15 with an 18-yard pass to Miller, then found Harmon for 24 yards on 3rd and 9. Butts scored from a yard out on the next play, putting the Chargers ahead 14–13 early in the final quarter. After the Chiefs twice went three-and-out, either side of a Butts fumble, Harmon took a Humphries pass for 31 yards, and San Diego reached a 3rd and 1 on the Kansas City 45. With Butts out of the game, Harmon was stopped for no gain and Ross opted to punt. Two further punts followed, before Kansas City took over on its own 33 with 3:18 to play. Dave Krieg completed three consecutive passes, positioning his team for Lowery's game-winning 36-yard field goal with 54 seconds to play. The Chargers began their final drive on their own 20. Harmon got out of bounds for an 11-yard gain on the first play, but Humphries was sacked on the next, before Dale Carter made a game-clinching interception.

Humphries completed 20 of 35 for 294 yards, with a touchdown and an interception. He was sacked six times, and fumbled twice. The Chargers outgained Kansas City 295–211, but committed all four of the game's turnovers. Following this defeat, San Diego was two games behind Denver and one behind Kansas City in the AFC West.

==== Week 11: at Cleveland Browns ====
Week Eleven: San Diego Chargers at Cleveland Browns – Game summary

Quarter	1	2	3	4	Total
Chargers	7	0	0	7	**14**
Browns	0	3	0	10	**13**

at Municipal Stadium, Cleveland, Ohio

- Date: November 15
- Game time: 1:00 p.m. EST
- Game weather: 28 °F (−2.2 °C), relative humidity 76%, wind 11 mph, wind chill 18
- Game attendance: 58,396
- Referee: Ed Hochuli
- TV announcers (NBC): Dan Hicks and Joe Namath
- Box score

Game information

**First quarter**

- SDG – Shawn Jefferson 26-yard pass from Stan Humphries (John Carney kick), 9:36. Chargers 7–0. **Drive: 3 plays, 26 yards, 0:18.**

**Second quarter**

- CLE – Matt Stover 36-yard field goal, 0:07. Chargers 7–3. **Drive: 8 plays, 51 yards, 2:18.**

**Third quarter**

- No scoring plays.

**Fourth quarter**

- CLE – Michael Jackson 24-yard pass from Mike Tomczak (Matt Stover kick), 14:04. Browns 10–7. **Drive: 10 plays, 99 yards, 6:41.**
- CLE – Matt Stover 28-yard field goal, 5:00. Browns 13–7. **Drive: 5 plays, 16 yards, 2:16.**
- SDG – Anthony Miller 45-yard pass from Stan Humphries (John Carney kick), 2:05. Chargers 14–13. **Drive: 6 plays, 72 yards, 2:55.**

**Top passers**

- SDG – Stan Humphries – 19/32, 234 yards, 2 TD, INT
- CLE – Mike Tomczak – 18/32, 322 yards, TD, 2 INT

**Top rushers**

- SDG – Marion Butts – 19 rushes, 61 yards
- CLE – Kevin Mack – 17 rushes, 35 yards

**Top receivers**

- SDG – Anthony Miller – 7 receptions, 110 yards, TD
- CLE – Lawyer Tillman – 8 receptions, 148 yards

Harmon lost a fumble on the game's third play, and the Browns progressed to a 3rd and 4 from the Chargers 9-yard line. Carrington then intercepted Mike Tomczak and return the ball 69 yards to the Cleveland 26. After two incompletions, Humphries connected with Shawn Jefferson on a corner route for a touchdown. The Chargers threatened again on their next possession, but a third down sack pushed them out of realistic field goal range. Early in the second quarter, Floyd Fields had his only career interception, setting his team up at the Cleveland 49, but an underthrown Humphries pass was intercepted three plays later. The Chargers squandered another scoring chance late in the half when Carney's 48-yard field goal attempt was blocked. The Browns drove 51 yards the other way and Matt Stover was successful with a 36-yard kick, reducing San Diego's lead to 7–3 at the interval.

Cleveland and San Diego both punted from near midfield on their first drives of the second half; Carrington downed Kidd's punt at the Cleveland 1. The Browns then drove 99 yards in 10 plays to take the lead on Tomczak's touchdown pass to Michael Jackson. A 20-yard catch by Miller had the Chargers back in field goal range, but Kidd mishandled the snap on what would have been a game-tying 44-yard attempt. Harmon fumbled again on the next Chargers drive, leading to another Stover field goal and a 13–7 Cleveland lead with five minutes to play. San Diego began its next drive at its own 28. Butts rushed 4 times for 27 yards before Humphries overthrew Lewis in the end zone, bringing up a 3rd and 8 at the Cleveland 45. Humphries went long again, this time finding Miller in the middle of the end zone with 2:05 to play. Tomczak responded with three straight completions, but Carrington forced a fumble after the third of these, and Richard recovered at his own 38 with 52 seconds to play. Butts carried three times, with the Browns calling timeout after each of them before Kidd punted and Cleveland took over at its own 29-yard line with 29 seconds to play. Tomczak threw an incompletion, then was sacked by Mims. He had time for one more pass, which Jackson caught at the Chargers 36 with no time on the clock.

San Diego won despite Tomczak's 322 passing yards, the most any quarterback posted against the Charger defense all season. Miller caught 7 passes for 110 yards and a touchdown.

==== Week 12: vs. Tampa Bay Buccaneers ====
Week Twelve: Tampa Bay Buccaneers at San Diego Chargers – Game summary

Quarter	1	2	3	4	Total
Buccaneers	0	7	0	7	**14**
Chargers	12	10	0	7	**29**

at Jack Murphy Stadium, San Diego, California

- Date: November 22
- Game time: 1:00 p.m. PST
- Game weather: 58 °F (14.4 °C), relative humidity 42%, wind 8 mph
- Game attendance: 43,197
- Referee: Red Cashion
- TV announcers (CBS): Jim Hill and Hank Stram
- Box score

Game information

**First quarter**

- SDG – Ronnie Harmon 3-yard pass from Stan Humphries (John Carney kick), 4:06. Chargers 7–0. **Drive: 12 plays, 79 yards, 6:40.**
- SDG – Safety, Chris Mims sacked Vinny Testaverde in end zone, 3:20. Chargers 9–0.
- SDG – John Carney 28-yard field goal, 2:13. Chargers 12–0. **Drive: 4 plays, 8 yards, 0:52.**

**Second quarter**

- TB – Ron Hall 10-yard pass from Vinny Testaverde (Eddie Murray kick), 12:17. Chargers 12–7. **Drive: 10 plays, 80 yards, 4:49.**
- SDG – John Carney 31-yard field goal, 3:27. Chargers 15–7. **Drive: 8 plays, 37 yards, 4:21.**
- SDG – Ronnie Harmon 6-yard run (John Carney kick), 0:14. Chargers 22–7. **Drive: 8 plays, 61 yards, 14:46.**

**Third quarter**

- No scoring plays.

**Fourth quarter**

- TB – Vinny Testaverde 1-yard run (Eddie Murray kick), 13:28. Chargers 22–14. **Drive: 13 plays, 80 yards, 5:22.**
- SDG – Stan Humphries 4-yard run (John Carney kick), 1:12. Chargers 29–14. **Drive: 6 plays, 38 yards, 3:05.**

**Top passers**

- TB – Vinny Testaverde – 19/29, 187 yards, TD
- SDG – Stan Humphries – 13/28, 126 yards, TD

**Top rushers**

- TB – Reggie Cobb – 17 rushes, 73 yards
- SDG – Marion Butts – 22 rushes, 104 yards

**Top receivers**

- TB – Mark Carrier – 7 receptions, 76 yards
- SDG – Ronnie Harmon – 4 receptions, 43 yards, TD

Following an exchange of punts, the Chargers moved from their own 21 to the Tampa Bay 43. Humphries then eluded two potential sacks before taking off up the right sideline for 25 yards. Five plays later, on 3rd and goal from the 3, he found Harmon on a corner route for the touchdown. San Diego scored twice more in the next two minutes. After a penalty backed the Buccaneers up at their own 3, Mims broke through to bring down quarterback Vinny Testaverde for a safety. Lewis fielded the ensuing free kick near the left sideline at his own 20, angled right to exploit a gap in the Tampa coverage, broke a tackle and went for 62 yards before being forced out of bounds. That set up a Carney field goal and a 12–0 lead. Testaverde led an 80-yard drive in response, featuring an 18-yard run by former Charger Gary Anderson on 3rd and 9 and capped by Testaverde's own touchdown pass. Carney made a 31-yard field goal late in the half, and the Chargers got the ball back at their own 39 with 1:24 left. Harmon had three catches for 40 yards on the ensuing drive before scoring with a 6-yard run, extending the Charger lead to 22–7 with 14 seconds on the clock.

There was no scoring in the 3rd quarter, but Testaverde ran for a touchdown early in the 4th. The Chargers were driving in Buccaneers territory with six minutes to play when Butts lost a fumble. Tampa Bay reached a 4th and 4 at its own 36 and went for the first down but Anderson was stopped a yard short by Carrington and others. Humphries ran in an insurance touchdown in the final minutes, going 4 yards on a naked bootleg.

Mims had three of the Chargers' six sacks. Butts rushed 22 times for 104 yards. San Diego achieved its first winning record since the end of the 1987 season.

==== Week 13: vs. Los Angeles Raiders ====
Week Thirteen: Los Angeles Raiders at San Diego Chargers – Game summary

Quarter	1	2	3	4	Total
Raiders	0	3	0	0	**3**
Chargers	7	14	0	6	**27**

at Jack Murphy Stadium, San Diego, California

- Date: November 29
- Game time: 5:00 p.m. PST
- Game weather: 62 °F (16.7 °C), relative humidity 37%, wind 8 mph
- Game attendance: 59,894
- Referee: Dale Hamer
- TV announcers (ESPN): Mike Patrick and Joe Theismann
- Box score

Game information

**First quarter**

- SDG – Anthony Miller offensive fumble recovery in end zone (John Carney kick), 0:08. Chargers 7–0. **Drive: 7 plays, 55 yards, 3:26.**

**Second quarter**

- RAI – Jeff Jaeger 36-yard field goal, 8:43. Chargers 7–3. **Drive: 10 plays, 60 yards, 6:17.**
- SDG – Marion Butts 1-yard run (John Carney kick), 4:13. Chargers 14–3. **Drive: 8 plays, 85 yards, 4:20.**
- SDG – Shawn Jefferson 15-yard pass from Stan Humphries (John Carney kick), 0:16. Chargers 21–3. **Drive: 5 plays, 48 yards, 0:34.**

**Third quarter**

- No scoring plays.

**Fourth quarter**

- SDG – John Carney 27-yard field goal, 5:40. Chargers 24–3. **Drive: 7 plays, 10 yards, 4:13.**
- SDG – John Carney 21-yard field goal, 0:21. Chargers 27–3. **Drive: 5 plays, 30 yards, 3:03.**

**Top passers**

- RAI – Jay Schroeder – 14/19, 166 yards, INT
- SDG – Stan Humphries – 13/26, 164 yards, TD, INT

**Top rushers**

- RAI – Eric Dickerson – 17 rushes, 103 yards
- SDG – Marion Butts – 16 rushes, 71 yards, TD

**Top receivers**

- RAI – Tim Brown – 6 receptions, 60 yards
- SDG – Ronnie Harmon – 4 receptions, 74 yards

Los Angeles began by driving to the Chargers 21-yard line, but Kevin Murphy blocked Jeff Jaeger's field goal try. The Raiders gained a first down at the Chargers 48 on their next drive, but Jay Schroeder's pass was deflected slightly and intercepted inches from the ground by Richard, who returned it 20 yards to the Chargers 45. San Diego advanced to the Los Angeles 20-yard line, from where Butts broke through several tackles on a run up the middle, but had the ball knocked loose as he approached the goal line. The ball ran generously for Miller to fall on and recover as he rolled into the end zone. After a Raiders field goal, Jefferson converted a 3rd and 10 with a 15-yard catch, Bieniemy had an 18-yard run up the middle and Harmon pulled in a one-handed catch and broke to the right sideline for a 45-yard gain to the 1-yard line. Butts scored on the next play. The Raiders drove 62 yards and earned a first down at the Chargers 29-yard line late in the half. Tim Brown then caught a short pass but fumbled when tackled by Hall. Seau picked up the loose ball and, following laterals to Vanhorse and Carrington, the Chargers returned it a total of 28 yards to the Raiders 48-yard line. Harmon took a draw 33 yards to the 15-yard line, then had an apparent touchdown catch ruled incomplete. A Lewis catch and fumble was also ruled an incomplete pass before Jefferson caught a touchdown with 16 seconds left in the half, and the Chargers led 21–3.

San Diego missed chances to extend its lead on their first two possessions of the second half, with Butts stopped short on fourth down, and Humphries intercepted in Raiders territory. Los Angeles, however, gained only two first downs in the second half. Eric Dickerson, who had run for 100 yards in the first half, was limited to a single carry for 3 yards as his team played catch-up. Twice in the final quarter, the Raiders went for it on fourth down, but a Winter sack and an incompletion caused them to turn the ball over both times. In each case, the Chargers capitalised with a field goal.

Despite the wide margin of victory, San Diego only outgained the Raiders 333–324. Harmon had 4 carries for 37 yards, and 4 catches for 74 yards.

==== Week 14: at Phoenix Cardinals ====
Week Fourteen: San Diego Chargers at Phoenix Cardinals – Game summary

Quarter	1	2	3	4	Total
Chargers	0	10	7	10	**27**
Cardinals	14	0	7	0	**21**

at Sun Devil Stadium, Phoenix, Arizona

- Date: December 6
- Game time: 2:00 p.m. MDT
- Game weather: 52 °F (11.1 °C), relative humidity 65%, wind 3 mph
- Game attendance: 26,880
- Referee: Pat Haggerty
- TV announcers (NBC): Charlie Jones and Todd Christensen
- Box score

Game information

**First quarter**

- PHO – Ernie Jones 4-yard pass from Chris Chandler (Greg Davis kick), 12:15. Cardinals 7–0. **Drive: 4 plays, 28 yards, 2:45.**
- PHO – Johnny Johnson 6-yard run (Greg Davis kick), 7:24. Cardinals 14–0. **Drive: 4 plays, 73 yards, 1:54.**

**Second quarter**

- SDG – Anthony Miller 23-yard pass from Stan Humphries (John Carney kick), 14:12. Cardinals 14–7. **Drive: 3 plays, 27 yards, 0:49.**
- SDG – John Carney 50-yard field goal, 0:48. Cardinals 14–10. **Drive: 9 plays, 49 yards, 1:26.**

**Third quarter**

- PHO – Ricky Proehl 63-yard pass from Chris Chandler (Greg Davis kick), 7:19. Cardinals 21–10. **Drive: 7 plays, 85 yards, 4:09.**
- SDG – Eric Bieniemy 5-yard run (John Carney kick), 0:43. Cardinals 21–17. **Drive: 4 plays, 55 yards, 2:02.**

**Fourth quarter**

- SDG – Ronnie Harmon 1-yard run (John Carney kick), 8:44. Chargers 24–21. **Drive: 9 plays, 63 yards, 4:27.**
- SDG – John Carney 43-yard field goal, 1:44. Chargers 27–21. **Drive: 4 plays, 5 yards, 0:23.**

**Top passers**

- SDG – Stan Humphries – 20/32, 275 yards, TD, INT
- PHO – Mike Tomczak – 20/35, 251 yards, 2 TD, 2 INT

**Top rushers**

- SDG – Eric Bieniemy – 9 rushes, 24 yards, TD
- PHO – Johnny Johnson – 15 rushes, 48 yards, TD

**Top receivers**

- SDG – Nate Lewis – 4 receptions, 77 yards
- PHO – Ricky Proehl – 6 receptions, 112 yards, TD

Harmon fumbled the opening kickoff return, and the Cardinals had to travel only 28 yards for a Chris Chandler touchdown pass. Following a Charger punt, Vanhorse was flagged for a 43-yard pass interference setting up a Johnny Johnson touchdown run only 7:36 into the game. San Diego was forced to punt again, but Carrington intercepted Chandler and returned the ball 37 yards to give them another chance, starting at the opposition 27. After two plays netted four yards, Humphries hit Miller on an out route, and the receiver turned up the left sideline for a touchdown. Phoenix drove 69 yards to the Chargers 13 on the next possession, but Lee forced Johnson to fumble with Mims recovering. They missed another good scoring chance on their following drive, Greg Davis wide left on a 25-yard field goal. Lewis's 17-yard catch on 3rd and 10 helped move San Diego in range for a 50-yard field goal try, which Carney converted in the final minute of the half; the score was 14–10 at the interval.

Midway through the 3rd quarter, the Cardinals extended their lead—Ricky Proehl got behind Carrington for a 63-yard touchdown reception. The Chargers responded late in the quarter: Humphries had back-to-back completions of 25 yards to Bieniemy and 26 yards to Miller, before Bieniemy scored on a 5-yard run off right tackle. Humphries was intercepted early in the final quarter, but Seau forced a fumble on the next play and Byrd recovered at the Chargers 37. San Diego moved to a 2nd and 20 at the Phoenix 47-yard line, from where Humphries hit Lewis with a deep pass to the 1-yard line. Butts was stopped for no gain on the next play, then Humphries was nearly intercepted, before Harmon scored and the Chargers had their first lead at 24–20. Phoenix missed another scoring chance on the next drive, Byrd forcing Proehl to fumble at the Chargers 32, with Lee making the recovery. On the next Cardinals drive, O'Neal sacked Chandler on 4th and 5, setting up a Carney field goal with 1:44 to play. Frank ended the final Cardinals drive with a fourth-down interception.

O'Neal had 4 of the Chargers' 6 sacks. San Diego and Kansas City (who lost to Los Angeles) were tied at 8–5 with Denver a game back, though the Chiefs held the tiebreaker advantage having beaten the Chargers twice.

==== Week 15: vs. Cincinnati Bengals ====
Week Fifteen: Cincinnati Bengals at San Diego Chargers – Game summary

Quarter	1	2	3	4	Total
Bengals	7	3	0	0	**10**
Chargers	3	7	14	3	**27**

at Jack Murphy Stadium, San Diego, California

- Date: December 13
- Game time: 1:00 p.m. PST
- Game weather: 53 °F (11.7 °C), relative humidity 46%, wind 10 mph
- Game attendance: 50,579
- Referee: Dick Hantak
- TV announcers (NBC): Dan Hicks and Beasley Reece
- Box score

Game information

**First quarter**

- SDG – John Carney 21-yard field goal, 5:49. Chargers 3–0. **Drive: 14 plays, 77 yards, 9:11.**
- CIN – Jeff Query 83-yard pass from David Klingler (Jim Breech kick), 5:28. Bengals 7–3. **Drive: 1 play, 83 yards, 0:21.**

**Second quarter**

- CIN – Jim Breech 48-yard field goal, 1:41. Bengals 10–3. **Drive: 11 plays, 50 yards, 5:49.**
- SDG – Anthony Miller 11-yard pass from Stan Humphries (John Carney kick), 0:15. Tied 10–10. **Drive: 7 plays, 75 yards, 1:26.**

**Third quarter**

- SDG – Stan Humphries 1-yard run (John Carney kick), 4:19. Chargers 17–10. **Drive: 13 plays, 66 yards, 8:13.**
- SDG – Rod Bernstine 7-yard run (John Carney kick), 1:15. Chargers 24–10. **Drive: 5 plays, 18 yards, 2:48.**

**Fourth quarter**

- SDG – John Carney 48-yard field goal, 13:46. Chargers 27–10. **Drive: 4 plays, -6 yards, 1:00.**

**Top passers**

- CIN – David Klingler – 13/26, 195 yards, TD, 2 INT
- SDG – Stan Humphries – 19/28, 209 yards, TD, 2 INT

**Top rushers**

- CIN – Harold Green – 16 rushes, 73 yards
- SDG – Marion Butts – 6 rushes, 47 yards

**Top receivers**

- CIN – Jeff Query – 1 reception, 83 yards, TD
- SDG – Ronnie Harmon – 8 receptions, 80 yards

Despite another bad start, the Chargers assured themselves of a winning record and maintained their playoff push. They held the ball for over nine minutes on their opening drive, going 77 yards in 14 plays with Harmon twice converting third down situations. The running back was eventually stopped at the 3 on 3rd and goal from the 11, and Carney opened the scoring with a short field goal. The Bengals required only one play to respond, David Klingler using play action and finding Jeff Query behind Byrd and Carrington for an 83-yard touchdown. Humphries was intercepted three plays later, though the Chargers defense forced a three-and-out. San Diego then began another long drive, going from its own 20 to a 3rd and goal at the Cincinnati 4-yard line. On the fifteenth play of the drive, Humphries was intercepted in the end zone. The Bengals drove 50 yards the other way, and added a field goal with 1:41 remaining in the half. Starting from his own 25, Humphries threw passes on seven consecutive plays, completing six of them to four different receivers. He found Miller on a corner route for an 11-yard touchdown with 15 seconds on the clock, and the game was tied 10–10 at halftime.

The Chargers drove 66 yards in 13 plays for another touchdown on their first drive of the second half. Jefferson's juggling 18-yard catch on 3rd and 11 moved the ball into Bengals territory, and Humphries rolled right on a naked bootleg on 4th and goal from the 1, narrowly making it across the goal line. Plummer intercepted Klingler on the next play, leaving his offense to drive only 18 yards for their third touchdown in a row: Humphries converted a 4th and 1 with a sneak, and Bernstine, back after an eight-week injury break, went up the middle to score from the 7. After only three more plays, Klinger had a pass batted high in the air by Seau, with Carrington claiming an interception. That set up a 48-yard Carney field goal. An O'Neal sack pushed Cincinnati out of field goal range on their next drive, and San Diego saw out the rest of the game without incident.

The Chargers possessed the ball for nearly 22 minutes in the first half alone, and for over 39 minutes in total. Harmon had 8 catches for 80 yards, and 5 carries for 30 yards.

==== Week 16: at Los Angeles Raiders ====
Week Sixteen: San Diego Chargers at Los Angeles Raiders – Game summary

Quarter	1	2	3	4	Total
Chargers	3	20	3	10	**36**
Raiders	0	0	7	7	**14**

at Memorial Coliseum, Los Angeles, California

- Date: December 20
- Game time: 1:00 p.m. PST
- Game weather: 50 °F (10.0 °C), relative humidity 31%, wind 8 mph
- Game attendance: 40,152
- Referee: Gary Lane
- TV announcers (NBC): Charlie Jones and Todd Christensen
- Box score

Game information

**First quarter**

- SDG – John Carney 42-yard field goal, 6:59. Chargers 3–0. **Drive: 12 plays, 59 yards, 6:59.**

**Second quarter**

- SDG – John Carney 23-yard field goal, 0:54. Chargers 6–0. **Drive: 13 plays, 51 yards, 7:38.**
- SDG – Anthony Miller 14-yard pass from Stan Humphries (John Carney kick), 4:30. Chargers 13–0. **Drive: 6 plays, 40 yards, 2:32.**
- SDG – Nate Lewis 50-yard pass from Stan Humphries (John Carney kick), 8:12. Chargers 20–0. **Drive: 3 plays, 58 yards, 1:25.**
- SDG – John Carney 25-yard field goal, 14:49. Chargers 23–0. **Drive: 10 plays, 43 yards, 1:37.**

**Third quarter**

- SDG – John Carney 28-yard field goal, 8:20. Chargers 26–0. **Drive: 13 plays, 56 yards, 5:15.**
- RAI – Alexander Wright 21-yard pass from Vince Evans (Jeff Jaeger kick), 13:22. Chargers 26–7. **Drive: 6 plays, 27 yards, 3:03.**

**Fourth quarter**

- SDG – Eric Bieniemy 1-yard run (John Carney kick), 4:30. Chargers 33–7. **Drive: 2 plays, 3 yards, 0:40.**
- RAI – Tim Brown 5-yard pass from Vince Evans (Jeff Jaeger kick), 7:40. Chargers 33–14. **Drive: 8 plays, 61 yards, 3:10.**
- SDG – John Carney 23-yard field goal, 12:19. Chargers 36–14. **Drive: 7 plays, 49 yards, 4:39.**

**Top passers**

- SDG – Stan Humphries – 17/32, 237 yards, 2 TD
- RAI – Vince Evans – 9/20, 115 yards, 2 TD, 2 INT

**Top rushers**

- SDG – Marion Butts – 16 rushes, 52 yards
- RAI – Vince Evans – 3 rushes, 24 yards

**Top receivers**

- SDG – Nate Lewis – 2 receptions, 70 yards, TD
- RAI – Alexander Wright – 2 receptions, 32 yards, TD

After taking the opening kickoff, San Diego drove 59 yards in 12 plays, with Bernstine converting a pair of third downs. Carney capped the drive with a 42-yard field goal, putting San Diego ahead to stay. After a Raiders three-and-out, the Chargers used up the remainder of the opening quarter, going 51 yards in 13 plays. Humphries converted a 4th and inches with a quarterback sneak, but San Diego eventually settled for another field goal. Los Angeles failed to gain a first down on either of its next two possessions, and the Chargers took control with a pair of Humphries touchdown passes. On 3rd and 6 from the Raiders 14, he hit Miller on an out pattern; the receiver eluded a tackler and turned up the right sideline to score. Next, Humphries found Lewis in stride inside the Raiders 10 for a 50-yard touchdown. Los Angeles responded by moving into Charger territory for the first time, but Byrd's one-handed interception ended the threat. Lewis's 20-yard reception on 3rd and 12 was the biggest play of the next drive, which ended with another Carney field goal. The Chargers led 23–0 at the break, having scored on all five of their first half possessions while holding the ball for over 20 minutes and outgaining the Raiders 233–30.

The Charger defense continued their dominance into the 3rd quarter, forcing three further three-and-outs while Carney added another field goal. Los Angeles's backup quarterback Vince Evans threw two touchdowns in the latter stages, but San Diego responded each time. Seau's interception set up a short Bieniemy touchdown run, and Walker's 34-yard reception positioned Carney for a fifth field goal.

Byrd made his 42nd and final interception. All of these were with the Chargers, and remain a club record for a career. Carney set a club record with five field goals in a single game. Due to a loss by Kansas City earlier in the day, San Diego moved into first place in the AFC West; the Chargers also clinched a playoff berth, their first since 1982.

==== Week 17: at Seattle Seahawks ====
Week Seventeen: San Diego Chargers at Seattle Seahawks – Game summary

Quarter	1	2	3	4	Total
Chargers	0	6	7	18	**31**
Seahawks	7	0	7	0	**14**

at Kingdome, Seattle, Washington

- Date: December 27
- Game time: 1:00 p.m. PST
- Game weather: N/A (game played indoors)
- Game attendance: 49,324
- Referee: Bernie Kukar
- TV announcers (NBC): Charlie Jones and Todd Christensen
- Box score

Game information

**First quarter**

- SEA – Chris Warren 30-yard run (John Kasay kick), 10:53. Seahawks 7–0. **Drive: 7 plays, 93 yards, 4:07.**

**Second quarter**

- SDG – John Carney 31-yard field goal, 12:35. Seahawks 7–3. **Drive: 10 plays, 65 yards, 3:58.**
- SDG – John Carney 38-yard field goal, 2:44. Seahawks 7–6. **Drive: 6 plays, 55 yards, 2:18.**

**Third quarter**

- SDG – Marion Butts 7-yard run (John Carney kick), 8:56. Chargers 13–7. **Drive: 10 plays, 80 yards, 6:04.**
- SEA – Trey Junkin 2-yard pass from Stan Gelbaugh (John Kasay kick), 4:21. Seahawks 14–13. **Drive: 7 plays, 86 yards, 4:35.**

**Fourth quarter**

- SDG – John Carney 47-yard field goal, 5:17. Chargers 16–14. **Drive: 10 plays, 68 yards, 6:08.**
- SDG – Ronnie Harmon 5-yard run (John Carney kick), 3:06. Chargers 23–14. **Drive: 3 plays, 8 yards, 0:28.**
- SDG – Safety, Burt Grossman sacked Stan Gelbaugh in end zone, 2:18. Chargers 25–14.
- SDG – Darren Carrington 28-yard interception return (pass failed), 1:14. Chargers 31–14.

**Top passers**

- SDG – Stan Humphries – 8/14, 138 yards
- SEA – Stan Gelbaugh – 17/32, 22 yards, TD, 2 INT

**Top rushers**

- SDG – Marion Butts – 13 rushes, 64 yards, TD
- SEA – Chris Warren – 5 rushes, 66 yards, TD

**Top receivers**

- SDG – Anthony Miller – 6 receptions, 96 yards
- SEA – Brian Blades – 6 receptions, 103 yards

Seattle was on its way to a record for the fewest points scored in a 16-game regular season (140), but drove 93 yards in only 7 plays to start the game with Chris Warren running for gains of 31 and 30 yards, the latter for a touchdown. Walker's 17-yard catch on 3rd on 5 helped position San Diego for a field goal—Carney's 31-yard kick was his 14th success in a row, a club record. In response, the Seahawks were poised for a field goal try of their own, but a botched hold prevented them getting the kick away. Humphries completed a 55-yard pass to Lewis on the next drive, but was sacked by Rufus Porter and Cortez Kennedy soon afterwards, and knocked out of the game with a dislocated shoulder. San Diego settled for another field goal, and trailed 7–6 at halftime.

Week 1 starter Gagliano played the second half at quarterback for the Chargers. He led an 8-play, 80-yard touchdown drive to start the second half, finding Miller for completions of 25, 11 (on 4th and 3), and 19 yards. Butts finished the drive with a 7-yard touchdown, fighting through the attempted tackle of Robert Blackmon. The Seahawks responded with another quick touchdown drive, going 86 yards in 7 plays for a 14–13 lead. With 11 minutes remaining in the game, San Diego was facing a 3rd and 1 from their own 12-yard line. Gagliano completed back-to-back passes of 19 yards to Jefferson and 22 yards to Miller, Butts picked up a further first down and Carney put the Chargers ahead with a 47-yard field goal with 5:17 to play. San Diego scored three more times in the span of barely four minutes. Plummer intercepted Stan Gelbaugh, returning the ball 38 yards to the Seattle 8. Three plays later, Harmon took a delayed handoff and swept left for a 5-yard touchdown. Gelbaugh was sacked by O'Neal and Grossman on the next drive, the latter in the end zone for Grossman's second safety of the season. The Chargers then went three-and-out, but Gelbaugh was soon intercepted again, Byrd tipping the ball for Carrington to intercept and return 26 yards for the game's final points.

Gagliano was 9 of 15 for 125 yards in what proved to be the last on-field action of his career. San Diego won its division for the first time since 1981.

=== Standings ===
AFC West
	W	L	T	PCT	DIV	CONF	PF	PA	STK
^{(3)} San Diego Chargers	11	5	0	.688	5–3	9–5	335	241	W7
^{(6)} Kansas City Chiefs	10	6	0	.625	6–2	8–4	348	282	W1
Denver Broncos	8	8	0	.500	4–4	7–5	262	329	L1
Los Angeles Raiders	7	9	0	.438	4–4	5–7	249	281	W1
Seattle Seahawks	2	14	0	.125	1–7	2–10	140	312	L4

== Postseason ==
Round	Date	Opponent (seed)	Result	Record	Venue	Attendance
Wildcard	January 2, 1993	Kansas City Chiefs (6)	W 17–0	1–0	Jack Murphy Stadium	58,278
Divisional	January 10, 1993	at Miami Dolphins (2)	L 0–31	1–1	Joe Robbie Stadium	71,224

=== Game summaries ===
==== AFC Wild Card Playoffs: Chiefs at Chargers ====
AFC Wild Card Playoffs: (#6) Kansas City Chiefs at (#3) San Diego Chargers – Game summary

Quarter	1	2	3	4	Total
Chiefs	0	0	0	0	0
Chargers	0	0	10	7	17

at Jack Murphy Stadium, San Diego, California

- Date: January 2
- Game time: 1:00 p.m. PST
- Game weather: 62 °F (17 °C), rain
- Game attendance: 58,278
- Referee: Dick Hantak
- TV announcers (ABC): Brent Musburger (play-by-play) and Dick Vermeil (color commentator)

Game information

First quarter

- No scoring plays.

Second quarter

- No scoring plays.

Third quarter

- SDG – Marion Butts 54-yard run (John Carney kick), 5:53. Chargers 7–0. Drive: 4 plays, 74 yards, 1:57.
- SDG – John Carney 34-yard field goal, 3:33. Chargers 10–0. Drive: 4 plays, 9 yards, 2:03.

Fourth quarter

- SDG – Steve Hendrickson 5-yard run (John Carney kick), 4:57. Chargers 17–0. Drive: 10 plays, 91 yards, 5:32.

Top passers

- KAN – Dave Krieg – 16/34, 233 yards, 2 INT
- SDG – Stan Humphries – 14/23, 199 yards

Top rushers

- KAN – Harvey Williams – 12 rushes, 35 yards
- SDG – Marion Butts – 15 rushes, 119 yards, TD

Top receivers

- KAN – J. J. Birden – 4 receptions, 78 yards
- SDG – Derrick Walker – 3 receptions, 60 yards

Humphries was cleared to start after his injury the previous week. He completed a 39-yard pass to Lewis on the game's first play; San Diego reached a 2nd and 7 on the Chiefs 9-yard line before Humphries and Butts failed to complete the exchange on a handoff and Kansas City recovered the ball. The next seven drives all ended in punts. Late in the half, San Diego reached the Kansas City 27 before being pushed back by a sack. Carney eventually attempted a 52-yard field goal, which struck the crossbar and fell short with 34 seconds left. Kansas City reached the Chargers' 42-yard line, from where Krieg's pass was intercepted near the goal line by Carrington as time expired in a scoreless half.

San Diego opened the scoring nine minutes in the 3rd quarter. On a 2nd and 2 from his 46-yard line, Butts ran through the line of scrimmage and eluded a potential tackle before breaking away for a touchdown. Krieg's pass on the following play was batted up in the air by Winter and intercepted by O'Neal to set up a field goal. Facing a 3rd and 2 at his own 18-yard line in the final quarter, Humphries completed a 44-yard pass to Miller, who fumbled while being tackled. Numerous players had chances to gain possession of the ball before Harmon recovered it at the Kansas City 28-yard line. Steve Hendrickson's clinching touchdown followed seven plays later.

Humphries was sacked five times and Krieg seven times as both defenses were dominant; Kansas City didn't get any farther than the San Diego 34-yard line all game. Hendrickson's touchdown run was his only carry of the season. Chargers go to the Divisional Round but lost to the Dolphins 31–0.

==== AFC Divisional Playoffs: Chargers at Dolphins ====
AFC Divisional Playoffs: (#3) San Diego Chargers at (#2) Miami Dolphins – Game summary

Quarter	1	2	3	4	Total
Chargers	0	0	0	0	0
Dolphins	0	21	0	10	31

at Joe Robbie Stadium, Miami, Florida

- Date: January 10
- Game time: 4:00 p.m. EST
- Game weather: 84 °F (29 °C), rain
- Game attendance: 71,224
- Referee: Johnny Grier
- TV announcers (NBC): Dick Enberg (play-by-play) and Bob Trumpy (color commentator)

Game information

First quarter

- No scoring plays.

Second quarter

- MIA – Tony Paige 1-yard pass from Dan Marino (Pete Stoyanovich kick), 6:30. Dolphins 7–0. Drive: 9 plays, 48 yards, 5:00.
- MIA – Keith Jackson 9-yard pass from Dan Marino (Pete Stoyanovich kick), 1:46. Dolphins 14–0. Drive: 2 plays, 37 yards, 0:13.
- MIA – Keith Jackson 30-yard pass from Dan Marino (Pete Stoyanovich kick), 0:27. Dolphins 21–0. Drive: 4 plays, 42 yards, 0:27.

Third quarter

- No scoring plays.

Fourth quarter

- MIA – Pete Stoyanovich 22-yard field goal, 14:03. Dolphins 24–0. Drive: 12 plays, 60 yards, 7:00.
- MIA – Aaron Craver 25-yard run (Pete Stoyanovich kick), 8:19. Dolphins 31–0. Drive: 6 plays, 53 yards, 4:12.

Top passers

- SDG – Stan Humphries – 18/44, 140 yards, 4 INT
- MIA – Dan Marino – 17/29, 167 yards, 3 TD

Top rushers

- SDG – Eric Bieniemy – 4 rushes, 26 yards
- MIA – Aaron Craver – 8 rushes, 72 yards, TD

Top receivers

- SDG – Ronnie Harmon – 9 receptions, 73 yards
- MIA – Mark Duper – 3 receptions, 57 yards

Humphries was intercepted four times as the Chargers were shut out by Miami. Dan Marino threw three touchdowns in the 2nd quarter, each of those following an interception. San Diego's farthest progress of the game was the Miami 40-yard line; the Chargers converted only 3 of 15 third down attempts. Chargers lost and in 1993 missed the playoffs 8–8.

== Awards ==
Five Chargers were named to the 1993 Pro Bowl, with Seau and Byrd both named to the Associated Press (AP) All-Pro team. Also, Seau and O'Neal both received votes for the Defensive Player of the Year Award, (Note: Cortez Kennedy won the award with 33 votes; Seau and O'Neal received 12 and 3 respectively.) and Ross came close to winning the AP Coach of the Year Award. (Note: Bill Cowher won with 23 votes; Ross had 20.)

Player	Position	Pro Bowl starter	Pro Bowl reserve	AP 1st team All-Pro	AP 2nd team All-Pro
Gill Byrd	Cornerback	Yes			Yes
Ronnie Harmon	Running back		Yes		
Anthony Miller	Wide receiver	Yes			
Leslie O'Neal	Defensive end	Yes			
Junior Seau	Linebacker	Yes		Yes	
