= 1996 Frankfurt Galaxy season =

World League of American Football team season

- General manager: Chris Heyne
- Head coach: Ernie Stautner
- Home stadium: Waldstadion

Results
- Record: 6–4
- Division place: 2nd
- Playoffs: Lost World Bowl '96

The 1996 Frankfurt Galaxy season was the fourth season for the franchise in the World League of American Football (WLAF). The team was led by head coach Ernie Stautner in his second year, and played its home games at Waldstadion in Frankfurt, Germany. They finished the regular season in second place with a record of six wins and four losses. In World Bowl '96, Frankfurt lost to the Scottish Claymores 32–27.

== Offseason ==
=== World League draft ===
1996 Frankfurt Galaxy World League draft selections
Draft order		Player name	Position	College
Round	Choice	Player name	Position	College
1	6	Mark Byers	LB	UNLV
2	12	Jay Kearney	WR	West Virginia
3	13	Lance Gunn	DB	Texas
4	24	Marquel Fleetwood	QB	Minnesota
5	25	Fred Foggie	DB	Boise State
6	36	Charles Hope	G	Central State
7	37	Ed Robinson	LB	Florida
8	48	Ron Collins	T	Fresno State
9	49	Garry Pay	C	BYU
10	60	Reginald Lee	LB	Youngstown State
11	61	Thomas Baskin	DT	Texas
12	72	Eric Jonassen	T	Bloomsburg
13	75	Hillary Butler	LB	Washington
14	86	Ronnie Woolfolk	LB	Colorado
15	87	Wes Bender	RB	USC
16	98	Donald Toomer	DB	Utah State
17	99	Steve Brooks	TE	Occidental College
18	110	Vernon Edwards	DE	SMU
19	111	Theo Adams	T	Hawaii
20	121	John Paci	QB	Indiana
21	122	Jerrick Bledsoe	DB	Texas Southern
22	131	Eric Gant	RB	Grambling State
23	132	Tirrell Greene	G	Miami
23	134	Curtis Shearer	WR	San Diego State

== Personnel ==
=== Staff ===
1996 Frankfurt Galaxy (NFL Europe) staff
Front office: General Manager – Chris Heyne; Head coaches: Head Coach – Ernie Stautner; Offensive coaches: Offensive Coordinator – Thomas Coleman; Offensive Line – Fred Quillan; Offensive Assistant – Lew Carpenter	Defensive coaches: Defensive Coordinator/Linebackers – LaVern Torgeson; Defensive Line – C. L. Whittington; National Coach/Defensive Backs – Florian Berrenberg

=== Roster ===
1996 Frankfurt Galaxy final roster
Quarterbacks: 14 Brad Bretz; 10 Jerry Colquitt; 12 Terry Karg; 16 Steve Pelluer; Running backs: 20 Wes Bender; 7 Nathaniel Bolton; 30 Bobby Phillips; 43 Kevin Williams; Wide receivers: 81 Mario Bailey; 84 Mike Bellamy; 1 Gary Harrell; 2 Tony Harrison; 15 Jay Kearney; Tight ends: 87 Maurice Johnson; 89 Ed Smith	Offensive linemen: 72 Theo Adams G; 68 Michael Batiste G; 65 Ron Collins T; 75 Tirrell Greene G; 69 George Hegamin T; 64 Charles Hope G; 62 Toby Mills C; 79 Craig Ritter T; 76 Mike Suarez C/T; Defensive linemen: 63 Jon Baker DE; 91 Thomas Baskin DT; 66 Mike Kerr DE; 90 Don Reynolds DT; 95 Patrick Scott DE; 59 Ronnie Woolfork DE	Linebackers: 57 Hillary Butler MLB; 58 Mark Byers OLB; 50 Bernard Carter OLB; 53 Tom Cavallo MLB; 56 Reginald Lee OLB; 51 Ed Robinson OLB; Defensive backs: 21 Curtis Cotton S; 42 Johnny Dixon S; 22 Cecil Doggette CB; 36 Fred Foggie CB; 39 Lance Gunn S; 32 Chris Hall CB; 27 Greg Patrick S; Special teams: 3 Kevin Feighery P	National players: 83 (Germany) Martin Driever TE; 67 (Germany) Stefan Gamlin DT; 9 (Germany) Ralf Kleinmann K; 80 (Germany) Daniel Koenner WR; 99 (Germany) Frank Messmer DT; 6 (Denmark) Ollie Quass K; 24 (Germany) Ingo Seibert RB; Rookies in italics

== Schedule ==
Week	Date	Kickoff (Note: All times local to where the game was played.)	Opponent	Results		Game site	Attendance
Week	Date	Kickoff	Opponent	Final score	Team record	Game site	Attendance
1	Saturday, April 13	7:00 p.m.	at Rhein Fire	W 27–21	1–0	Rheinstadion	32,092
2	Saturday, April 20	7:00 p.m.	London Monarchs	W 37–3	2–0	Waldstadion	34,186
3	Sunday, April 28	6:00 p.m.	at Barcelona Dragons	W 33–29	3–0	Estadi Olímpic de Montjuïc	17,503
4	Sunday, May 5	7:00 p.m.	Amsterdam Admirals	W 40–28	4–0	Waldstadion	28,627
5	Saturday, May 11	7:00 p.m.	Scottish Claymores	L 0–20	4–1	Waldstadion	32,126
6	Sunday, May 19	3:00 p.m.	at London Monarchs	L 7–27	4–2	White Hart Lane	10,764
7	Sunday, May 26	3:00 p.m.	at Scottish Claymores	L 17–20	4–3	Murrayfield Stadium	13,116
8	Saturday, June 1	7:00 p.m.	Rhein Fire	L 8–31	4–4	Waldstadion	38,798
9	Saturday, June 8	7:00 p.m.	Barcelona Dragons	W 24–21	5–4	Waldstadion	33,115
10	Saturday, June 15	6:30 p.m.	at Amsterdam Admirals	W 28–20	6–4	Olympisch Stadion	14,062
World Bowl '96
11	Sunday, June 23	6:00 p.m.	at Scottish Claymores	L 27–32	6–5	Murrayfield Stadium	38,982

== Standings ==
World League of American Football
Team	W	L	T	PCT	PF	PA	Home	Road	STK
Scottish Claymores	7	3	0	.700	233	190	5–0	2–3	L1
Frankfurt Galaxy	6	4	0	.600	221	220	3–2	3–2	W2
Amsterdam Admirals	5	5	0	.500	250	210	4–1	1–4	L1
Barcelona Dragons	5	5	0	.500	192	230	4–1	1–4	W1
London Monarchs	4	6	0	.400	161	192	3–2	1–4	W1
Rhein Fire	3	7	0	.300	176	191	2–3	1–4	L2

== Game summaries ==
=== Week 1: at Rhein Fire ===
Week One: Frankfurt Galaxy at Rhein Fire – Game summary

Quarter	1	2	3	4	Total
Frankfurt	10	0	7	10	27
Rhein	0	0	7	14	21

at Rheinstadion, Düsseldorf, Germany

- Date: Saturday, April 13
- Game time: 7:00 p.m. CEST
- Game attendance: 32,092

=== Week 2: vs London Monarchs ===
Week Two: London Monarchs at Frankfurt Galaxy – Game summary

Quarter	1	2	3	4	Total
London	0	3	0	0	3
Frankfurt	7	14	13	3	37

at Waldstadion, Frankfurt, Germany

- Date: Saturday, April 20
- Game time: 7:00 p.m. CEST
- Game attendance: 34,186

=== Week 3: at Barcelona Dragons ===
Week Three: Frankfurt Galaxy at Barcelona Dragons – Game summary

Quarter	1	2	3	4	Total
Frankfurt	7	3	7	16	33
Barcelona	6	3	0	20	29

at Estadi Olímpic de Montjuïc, Barcelona, Spain

- Date: Sunday, April 28
- Game time: 6:00 p.m. CEST
- Game attendance: 17,503

=== Week 4: vs Amsterdam Admirals ===
Week Four: Amsterdam Admirals at Frankfurt Galaxy – Game summary

Quarter	1	2	3	4	Total
Amsterdam	0	14	14	0	28
Frankfurt	14	20	0	6	40

at Waldstadion, Frankfurt, Germany

- Date: Sunday, May 5
- Game time: 7:00 p.m. CEST
- Game attendance: 28,627

=== Week 5: vs Scottish Claymores ===
Week Five: Scottish Claymores at Frankfurt Galaxy – Game summary

Quarter	1	2	3	4	Total
Scotland	3	0	3	14	20
Frankfurt	0	0	0	0	0

at Waldstadion, Frankfurt, Germany

- Date: Saturday, May 11
- Game time: 7:00 p.m. CEST
- Game attendance: 32,126

=== Week 6: at London Monarchs ===
Week Six: Frankfurt Galaxy at London Monarchs – Game summary

Quarter	1	2	3	4	Total
Frankfurt	0	0	0	7	7
London	14	6	0	7	27

at White Hart Lane, London, England

- Date: Sunday, May 19
- Game time: 3:00 p.m. BST
- Game attendance: 10,764

=== Week 7: at Scottish Claymores ===
Week Seven: Frankfurt Galaxy at Scottish Claymores – Game summary

Quarter	1	2	3	4	Total
Frankfurt	7	0	3	7	17
Scotland	0	3	14	3	20

at Murrayfield Stadium, Edinburgh, Scotland

- Date: Sunday, May 26
- Game time: 3:00 p.m. BST
- Game attendance: 13,116

=== Week 8: vs Rhein Fire ===
Week Eight: Rhein Fire at Frankfurt Galaxy – Game summary

Quarter	1	2	3	4	Total
Rhein	21	7	0	3	31
Frankfurt	0	0	0	8	8

at Waldstadion, Frankfurt, Germany

- Date: Saturday, June 1
- Game time: 7:00 p.m. CEST
- Game attendance: 38,798

=== Week 9: vs Barcelona Dragons ===
Week Nine: Barcelona Dragons at Frankfurt Galaxy – Game summary

Quarter	1	2	3	4	Total
Barcelona	14	0	0	7	21
Frankfurt	0	7	7	10	24

at Waldstadion, Frankfurt, Germany

- Date: Saturday, June 8
- Game time: 7:00 p.m. CEST
- Game attendance: 33,115

=== Week 10: at Amsterdam Admirals ===
Week Ten: Frankfurt Galaxy at Amsterdam Admirals – Game summary

Quarter	1	2	3	4	Total
Frankfurt	13	8	7	0	28
Amsterdam	7	7	0	6	20

at Olympisch Stadion, Amsterdam, Netherlands

- Date: Saturday, June 15
- Game time: 6:30 p.m. CEST
- Game attendance: 14,062
