= 1994 Green Bay Packers season =

NFL team season

- Owner: Green Bay Packers, Inc.
- General manager: Ron Wolf
- President: Bob Harlan
- Head coach: Mike Holmgren
- Offensive coordinator: Sherman Lewis
- Defensive coordinator: Fritz Shurmur
- Home stadium: Lambeau Field; Milwaukee County Stadium

Results
- Record: 9–7
- Division place: 2nd NFC Central
- Playoffs: Won Wild Card Playoffs (vs. Lions) 16–12; Lost Divisional Playoffs (at Cowboys) 9–35
- Pro Bowlers: WR Sterling Sharpe; DE Reggie White; LB Bryce Paup

The 1994 season was the Green Bay Packers' 74th season in the National Football League (NFL), their 76th overall. The Packers finished with a 9–7 record for their third straight winning season. 1994 marked the first of 8 seasons in which Packers' quarterback Brett Favre would throw more than 30 touchdown passes. It also marked the second season in which he started all 16 games for the Packers, starting a record-breaking starting streak which would continue throughout his career. This was the final season that the Packers played at Milwaukee County Stadium; they played home games exclusively at Lambeau beginning in 1995. Three Packers had the distinction of being named to the NFL's All-Time 75th Anniversary Team: Reggie White, Don Hutson, and Ray Nitschke. After defeating the Detroit Lions 16–12 in the NFC Wild Card Game, the season ended in a 35–9 loss to the Dallas Cowboys in an NFC Divisional Playoff Game.

== Offseason ==
Additions	Subtractions
DE Sean Jones (Oilers)	G Doug Widell (Lions)
TE Reggie Johnson (Broncos)	OLB Tony Bennett (Colts)
RB Reggie Cobb (Buccaneers)	P Bryan Wagner (Chargers)
G Guy McIntyre (49ers)	TE Jackie Harris (Buccaneers)
DT Steve McMichael (Bears)	
LB Fred Strickland (Vikings)	
WR Curtis Duncan (Oilers)	

=== 1994 NFL draft ===
With their first selection (16th overall) in the 1994 NFL draft, the Packers tabbed offensive tackle Aaron Taylor.

1994 Green Bay Packers draft
Round	Pick	Player	Position	College	Notes
1	16	Aaron Taylor	Offensive tackle	Notre Dame	
3	84	LeShon Johnson	Running back	Northern Illinois	
4	126	Gabe Wilkins	Defensive end	Gardner–Webb	
5	146	Terry Mickens	Wide receiver	Florida A&M	
5	149	Dorsey Levens *	Running back	Georgia Tech	
6	169	Jay Kearney	Wide receiver	West Virginia	
6	175	Ruffin Hamilton	Linebacker	Tulane	
6	181	Bill Schroeder	Wide receiver	Wisconsin–La Crosse	
6	190	Paul Duckworth	Linebacker	Connecticut	
Made roster * Made at least one Pro Bowl during career

=== Undrafted free agents ===
1994 undrafted free agents of note
Player	Position	College
Randy Bierman	Defensive tackle	Illinois
Victor Brown	Safety	Tennessee
Johnny Cox	Wide receiver	Fort Lewis
Charlie Dean	Tight end	Florida
Daryl Frazier	Wide receiver	Florida
Reggie Holt	Strong Safety	Wisconsin
Lenny McGill	Cornerback	Arizona State
Lamark Shackerford	Defensive tackle	Wisconsin
Kurt Warner	Quarterback	Northern Iowa
Mark Williams	Linebacker	Ohio State
Jeff Wilner	Tight End	Wesleyan

== Staff ==
1994 Green Bay Packers staff
Front office: President/chief executive officer – Bob Harlan; Executive vice-president/general manager – Ron Wolf; Director of pro personnel – Ted Thompson; Director of college scouting – John Math; Pro personnel assistant – Reggie McKenzie; Head coaches: Head coach – Mike Holmgren; Offensive coaches: Offensive coordinator – Sherman Lewis; Quarterbacks – Steve Mariucci; Running backs – Gil Haskell; Wide receivers – Jon Gruden; Offensive line – Tom Lovat; Assistant offensive line/Tight Ends – Andy Reid	Defensive coaches: Defensive coordinator – Fritz Shurmur; Defensive line – Larry Brooks; Linebackers – Bob Valesente; Defensive backs/Secondary – Dick Jauron; Defensive assistant/quality control – Jim Lind; Special teams coaches: Special teams – Nolan Cromwell; Strength and conditioning: Strength and conditioning – Kent Johnston

== Roster ==
1994 Green Bay Packers roster
Quarterbacks (QB): 8 Mark Brunell; 11 Ty Detmer; 4 Brett Favre; Running backs (RB): 34 Edgar Bennett FB; 32 Reggie Cobb; 42 LeShon Johnson; 25 Dorsey Levens; 26 Darrell Thompson; 29 Marcus Wilson; Wide receivers (WR): 87 Robert Brooks; 80 Charles Jordan; 88 Terry Mickens; 81 Anthony Morgan; 84 Sterling Sharpe; Tight ends (TE): 89 Mark Chmura; 82 Reggie Johnson; 86 Ed West; 83 Jeff Wilner	Offensive linemen (OL): 71 Gary Brown LT; 72 Earl Dotson RT; 63 Jamie Dukes C; 76 Harry Galbreath G; 70 Charles Hope G; 67 Paul Hutchins RT; 62 Guy McIntyre G; 75 Ken Ruettgers LT; 68 Joe Sims RT; 52 Frank Winters C; Defensive linemen (DL): 94 Matt Brock DT; 99 Don Davey DT; 78 Tommy Fagan DE; 90 Steve McMichael DT; 96 Sean Jones DE; 64 John Jurkovic DT; 92 Reggie White DE; 98 Gabe Wilkins DE	Linebackers (LB): 58 Ruffin Hamilton OLB; 53 George Koonce OLB; 95 Bryce Paup OLB; 59 Wayne Simmons OLB; 55 Fred Strickland MLB; 51 Mark Williams OLB; 56 James Willis MLB; Defensive backs (DB): 27 Terrell Buckley CB; 36 LeRoy Butler SS; 33 Doug Evans CB; 30 Corey Harris CB; 24 Tim Hauck SS; 37 Keshon Johnson CB; 39 Mike Prior FS; 31 George Teague FS; 35 Ray Wilson S; Special teams (ST): 17 Craig Hentrich P; 13 Chris Jacke K	Practice squad: 69 Ethan Albright LS; 54 Bernard Carter OLB; 18 Jay Kearney WR; 19 Bill Schroeder WR; Reserve: 93 Gilbert Brown DT (IR); 40 Charlie Dean TE (IR); -- Bob Kuberski DT (Military); 97 Matt LaBounty DE (IR); 85 Ron Lewis (IR); 22 Lenny McGill CB (IR); 47 Roland Mitchell CB (IR); 73 Aaron Taylor G (PUP); 23 Sammy Walker CB (IR); 53 active, 9 inactive, 4 practice squad Rookies in italics

== Regular season ==
The Packers finished 9–7, 2nd place in the NFC Central division, 1 game behind the 10–6 Warren Moon-led Minnesota Vikings. Via a better head-to-head record versus the Detroit Lions and the Chicago Bears and a better conference record versus the New York Giants, Green Bay clinched the first wild card spot in the NFC.

=== Schedule ===
Week	Date	Opponent	Result	Record	Venue	Attendance
1	September 4	**Minnesota Vikings**	**W** 16–10	1–0	Lambeau Field	59,487
2	September 11	Miami Dolphins	**L** 14–24	1–1	Milwaukee County Stadium	55,011
3	September 18	at Philadelphia Eagles	**L** 7–13	1–2	Veterans Stadium	63,922
4	September 25	**Tampa Bay Buccaneers**	**W** 30–3	2–2	Lambeau Field	58,551
5	October 2	at New England Patriots	**L** 16–17	2–3	Foxboro Stadium	57,522
6	October 9	Los Angeles Rams	**W** 24–17	3–3	Lambeau Field	58,911
7	Bye					
8	October 20	at **Minnesota Vikings**	**L** 10–13 (OT)	3–4	Hubert H. Humphrey Metrodome	63,041
9	October 31	at **Chicago Bears**	**W** 33–6	4–4	Soldier Field	47,381
10	November 6	**Detroit Lions**	**W** 38–30	5–4	Milwaukee County Stadium	54,995
11	November 13	New York Jets	**W** 17–10	6–4	Lambeau Field	58,307
12	November 20	at Buffalo Bills	**L** 20–29	6–5	Rich Stadium	79,029
13	November 24	at Dallas Cowboys	**L** 31–42	6–6	Texas Stadium	64,597
14	December 4	at **Detroit Lions**	**L** 31–34	6–7	Pontiac Silverdome	76,338
15	December 11	**Chicago Bears**	**W** 40–3	7–7	Lambeau Field	57,927
16	December 18	Atlanta Falcons	**W** 21–17	8–7	Milwaukee County Stadium	54,885
17	December 24	at **Tampa Bay Buccaneers**	**W** 34–19	9–7	Tampa Stadium	65,076

Note: Intra-division opponents are in bold text.

=== Game summaries ===
==== Week 1 vs Minnesota Vikings ====
Week 1: Minnesota Vikings at Green Bay Packers

Quarter	1	2	3	4	Total
Vikings	0	0	3	7	**10**
**Packers**	3	10	0	3	**16**

at Lambeau Field, Green Bay, Wisconsin

- Date: September 4, 1994
- Game time: 12:00 p.m. CST
- Game weather: Overcast, 58 °F (14 °C)
- Game attendance: 59,487
- TV announcers (Fox): Kevin Harlan and Jerry Glanville

Game information

**First quarter**

**Second quarter**

**Third quarter**

**Fourth quarter**

Top passers

- MIN – Warren Moon – 20/37, 166 yards, 3 INT
- GB – Brett Favre – 22/36, 185 yards, 1 TD

Top rushers

- MIN – Terry Allen – 11 rushes, 33 yards
- GB – Edgar Bennett – 16 rushes, 51 yards

Top receivers

- MIN – Jake Reed – 4 receptions, 42 yards
- GB – Sterling Sharpe – 7 receptions, 53 yards, 1 TD

The Packers kicked off the season at home against their division rival, the Minnesota Vikings, and came away with a 16–10 victory to improve to 1–0.

==== Week 9: at Chicago Bears ====
Week 9: Green Bay Packers at Chicago Bears

Quarter	1	2	3	4	Total
**Packers**	0	14	7	12	**33**
Bears	0	0	0	6	**6**

at Soldier Field, Chicago, Illinois

- Date: October 31, 1994
- Game time: 7:00 p.m. CST
- Game weather: Overcast, 49 °F (9 °C)
- Game attendance: 47,381
- Referee: Howard Roe
- TV announcers (ABC): Al Michaels, Frank Gifford, Dan Dierdorf, and Lynn Swann

Game information

**First quarter**

**Second quarter**

**Third quarter**

**Fourth quarter**

Top passers

- CHI – Steve Walsh – 16/25, 140 yards, 1 TD, 1 INT
- GB – Brett Favre – 6/15, 82 yards, 1 TD

Top rushers

- CHI – Lewis Tillman – 15 rushes, 51 yards
- GB – Edgar Bennett – 26 rushes, 105 yards, 2 TD

Top receivers

- CHI – Curtis Conway – 3 receptions, 49 yards
- GB – Sterling Sharpe – 3 receptions, 43 yards

==== Week 13: at Dallas Cowboys ====
Week 13: Green Bay Packers at Dallas Cowboys

Quarter	1	2	3	4	Total
Packers	7	10	7	7	**31**
**Cowboys**	0	6	19	17	**42**

at Texas Stadium, Irving, Texas

- Date: November 24, 1994
- Game time: 3:00 p.m. CST
- Game weather: Overcast, 47 °F (8 °C)
- Game attendance: 64,597
- TV announcers (Fox): Pat Summerall and John Madden

Game information

**First quarter**

**Second quarter**

**Third quarter**

**Fourth quarter**

Top passers

- GB – Brett Favre – 27/40, 257 yards, 4 TD
- DAL – Jason Garrett – 15/26, 311 yards, 2 TD, INT

Top rushers

- GB – Reggie Cobb – 9 rushes, 17 yards
- DAL – Emmitt Smith – 32 rushes, 133 yards, 2 TD

Top receivers

- GB – Sterling Sharpe – 9 receptions, 122 yards, 4 TD
- DAL – Alvin Harper – 3 receptions, 91 yards, TD

==== Week 16 vs. Atlanta Falcons ====
Week 16: Atlanta Falcons at Green Bay Packers

Quarter	1	2	3	4	Total
Falcons	3	6	0	8	**17**
**Packers**	14	0	0	7	**21**

at Milwaukee County Stadium, Milwaukee, Wisconsin

- Date: December 18, 1994
- Game time: 12:00 p.m. CST
- Game weather: Overcast, 33 °F (1 °C)
- Game attendance: 54,885
- Referee: Gary Lane
- TV announcers (Fox): Joe Buck and Tim Green

Game information

**First quarter**

**Second quarter**

**Third quarter**

**Fourth quarter**

Top passers

- ATL – Bobby Hebert – 20/41, 221 yards, 1 TD, 1 INT
- GB – Brett Favre – 29/44, 321 yards, 2 TD, 1 INT

Top rushers

- ATL – Craig Heyward – 21 rushes, 77 yards
- GB – Edgar Bennett – 13 rushes, 46 yards

Top receivers

- ATL – Andre Rison – 6 receptions, 95 yards
- GB – Edgar Bennett – 8 receptions, 101 yards

Ironically, the Packers, led by Brett Favre, who was a former Atlanta Falcons member, closed Milwaukee County Stadium by beating the Falcons.

=== Standings ===
NFC Central
	W	L	T	PCT	PF	PA	STK
^{(3)} Minnesota Vikings	10	6	0	.625	356	314	W1
^{(4)} Green Bay Packers	9	7	0	.563	382	287	W3
^{(5)} Detroit Lions	9	7	0	.563	357	342	L1
^{(6)} Chicago Bears	9	7	0	.563	271	307	L1
Tampa Bay Buccaneers	6	10	0	.375	251	351	L1

== Playoffs ==
Week	Date	Opponent	Result	Venue	Attendance
Wild Card	December 31, 1994	Detroit Lions	W 16–12	Lambeau Field	58,125
Divisional	January 8, 1995	at Dallas Cowboys	L 35–9	Texas Stadium	64,745

=== Playoffs summary ===
==== NFC Wild Card Game: VS Detroit Lions ====
NFC Wild Card Game: Detroit Lions at Green Bay Packers – Game summary

Quarter	1	2	3	4	Total
Lions	0	0	3	9	12
Packers	7	3	3	3	16

at Lambeau Field, Green Bay, Wisconsin

- Game time: 12:30 p.m. EST/11:30 a.m. CST
- Game weather: 31 °F (−1 °C), partly cloudy
- Game attendance: 58,125
- Referee: Gary Lane
- TV announcers (ABC): Brent Musburger, Dick Vermeil, and Lesley Visser

== Awards and honors ==
- Don Hutson, NFL 75th Anniversary All-Time Team
- Ray Nitschke, NFL 75th Anniversary All-Time Team
- Reggie White, NFL 75th Anniversary All-Time Team
