= Tirrell Greene =

American football player (born 1972)

No. 51
- Position: Guard / Center

Personal information
- Born: May 15, 1972 (age 54); Pittsburgh, Pennsylvania, U.S.
- Listed height: 6 ft 3 in (1.91 m)
- Listed weight: 302 lb (137 kg)

Career information
- High school: Pittsburgh (PA) Woodland Hills
- College: Miami (FL)
- NFL draft: 1995: undrafted

Career history
- Frankfurt Galaxy (1996)

Awards and highlights
- National champion (1991); First-team All-American (1994); First-team All-Big East (1993); Second-team All-Big East (1994)

Tirrell Greene (born May 15, 1972) is an American former football offensive lineman. He attended the University of Miami, where he was an All-American in 1994. Greene went undrafted in the 1995 NFL draft and played one season for the Frankfurt Galaxy.
