= 1993 All-Western Athletic Conference football team =

The 1993 All-Western Athletic Conference football team consists of American football players chosen by various organizations for All-WAC teams for the 1993 college football season.

== Offensive selections ==
=== Quarterbacks ===
- Trent Dilfer, Fresno St. (Coaches-1)
- Stoney Case, New Mexico (Coaches-2)

=== Running backs ===
- Marshall Faulk, San Diego St. (Coaches-1)
- Ron Rivers, Fresno St. (Coaches-1)
- Jamal Anderson, Utah (Coaches-2)
- Ryan Christopherson, Wyoming (Coaches-2)

=== Wide receivers ===
- Ryan Yarborough, Wyoming (Coaches-1)
- Darney Scott, San Diego St. (Coaches-1)
- Eric Drage, BYU (Coaches-1)
- Bryan Rowley, Utah (Coaches-2)
- Carl Winston, New Mexico (Coaches-2)

=== Tight ends ===
- Mike Jones, Wyoming (Coaches-1)
- Henry Lusk, Utah (Coaches-2)

=== Offensive Linemen ===
- Jason James, Fresno St. (Coaches-1)
- Bob Cox, Colorado St. (Coaches-1)
- Lance Scott, Utah (Coaches-1)
- Chad Mathis, Air Force (Coaches-1)
- Klint Hall, New Mexico (Coaches-1)
- Mike Empey, BYU (Coaches-1)
- Ron Collins, Fresno St. (Coaches-2)
- Pat Meyer, Colorado St. (Coaches-2)
- Carlson Leomiti, San Diego St. (Coaches-2)
- Anthony Brown, Utah (Coaches-2)
- Mike Alexander, San Diego St. (Coaches-2)
- Peter Pale, Hawaii (Coaches-2)

== Defensive selections ==
=== Defensive Linemen ===
- Steve Norton, Colorado St. (Coaches-1)
- Kurt Whitehead, Wyoming (Coaches-1)
- Luther Elliss, Utah (Coaches-1)
- Steve Hodge, Colorado St. (Coaches-1)
- Brad Bell, Fresno St. (Coaches-2)
- Lenny Gomes, BYU (Coaches-2)
- La'Roi Glover, San Diego St. (Coaches-2)
- Brent Shieffer, Wyoming (Coaches-2)

=== Linebackers ===
- Barron Wortham, UTEP (Coaches-1)
- Brian Schneider, Colorado St. (Coaches-1)
- Tuli Mateialona, New Mexico (Coaches-1)
- Todd Herget, BYU (Coaches-1)
- Mike Black, Air Force (Coaches-2)
- Mark Rexford, Utah (Coaches-2)
- Ron Papazian, Fresno St. (Coaches-2)
- Johnny Harrison, Air Force (Coaches-2)
- Al Aliipule, Hawaii (Coaches-2)

=== Defensive Backs ===
- Greg Myers, Colorado St. (Coaches-1)
- Eric Jack, New Mexico (Coaches-1)
- James Burton, Fresno St. (Coaches-1)
- Ray Wilson, New Mexico (Coaches-1)
- Andre Strode, Colorado St. (Coaches-2)
- Darrell Lewis, San Diego St. (Coaches-2)
- Brian Watkins, Air Force (Coaches-2)
- Kenny Johnson, Wyoming (Coaches-2)

== Special teams ==
=== Placekickers ===
- Derek Mahoney, Fresno St. (Coaches-1)
- Marshall Young, UTEP (Coaches-1)
- Chris Yergensen, Utah (Coaches-2)

=== Punters ===
- Chris MacInnis, Air Force (Coaches-1)
- Mike Nesbitt, New Mexico (Coaches-2)

=== Return specialists ===
- Greg Myers, Colorado St. (Coaches-1)
- Chris Yergensen, Utah (Coaches-2)

== Other ==
=== Offensive Player of the Year ===
- Trent Dilfer, Fresno St. (Coaches)

=== Defensive Player of the Year ===
- Barron Wortham, UTEP (Coaches)

=== Freshman of the Year ===
- Steve Scifres, Wyoming (Coaches)

=== Special Teams Player of the Year ===
- Chris MacInnis, Air Force (Coaches)

=== Coach of the Year ===
- Dennis Franchione, New Mexico (Coaches)

== Key ==
Coaches = Western Athletic Conference head football coaches and sports information directors.

== See also ==
- 1993 College Football All-America Team
