= George Hegamin =

American football player (born 1973)

Colorado Buffaloes
- Title: Offensive line coach

Personal information
- Born: February 14, 1973 (age 53); Camden, New Jersey, U.S.
- Listed height: 6 ft 7 in (2.01 m)
- Listed weight: 331 lb (150 kg)

Career information
- High school: Camden
- College: North Carolina State
- NFL draft: 1994: 3rd round, 102nd overall pick

Career history

Playing
- Dallas Cowboys (1994–1997); → Frankfurt Galaxy (1996); Philadelphia Eagles (1998); Tampa Bay Buccaneers (1999–2000)

Coaching
- Prime Prep Academy (2012) Offensive line coach; IMG Academy National Team (2019–2020) Offensive line coach; IMG Academy Post Grad Team (2020) Head coach; Colorado (2025–present) Offensive line coach

Awards and highlights
- Super Bowl champion (XXX); All-World (1996); Second-team All-ACC (1992); Freshman All-American (1992)

Career NFL statistics
- Games played: 64
- Games started: 17
- Fumble recoveries: 1
- Stats at Pro Football Reference

George Russell Hegamin (born February 14, 1973) is an American former professional football player who was an offensive lineman in the National Football League (NFL) for the Dallas Cowboys, Philadelphia Eagles, and Tampa Bay Buccaneers. He played college football at North Carolina State University.

== Early life ==
Hegamin started to play organized football as a junior at Camden High School in Camden, New Jersey. He received All-American honorable-mention and first-team All-state honors, as a senior defensive tackle.

He accepted a football scholarship from North Carolina State University, where he was converted into an offensive tackle. As a redshirt freshman in 1992, he won the right tackle starting job and received Freshman All-American and second-team All-ACC honors.

In 1993, he was platooned at right tackle with Scott Woods and was a part of an offensive line that surrendered only 14 sacks (third lowest in school history). At the end of the season, he bypassed his final two years of college to enter the NFL draft, in order to help his mother, who was diagnosed with cancer.

== Professional career ==
=== Dallas Cowboys ===
Hegamin was selected by the Dallas Cowboys in the third-round (102nd overall) of the 1994 NFL draft, and was the largest player picked in the draft. As a rookie, he was de-activated for the first seven games of the season. He appeared in three contests, before being de-activated for the rest of the regular season and the playoffs.

The next year, he appeared in the season opener, before being declared inactive for the next 12 games. With injuries along the offensive line, he was active but didn't play in the final three contests of the regular season. He was a part of the Super Bowl XXX championship team.

In 1996, he was allocated to the Frankfurt Galaxy of the World League of American Football, where he was a starter at right tackle and earned All-World honors. With the departure of Ron Stone in free agency, he was used as the Cowboys top backup for the offensive line. He had his first start, while filling-in for an injured Mark Tuinei in the season finale against the Washington Redskins.

In his first years in the league, he saw little action as a backup of arguably some of the best offensive lines in NFL history. In 1997, with the offensive line beginning to show its age, he started a total of nine games while replacing injured starters. Seven starts in place of Mark Tuinei at left tackle and two at left guard in place of Nate Newton. Although he was solid at run blocking, he didn't have the agility needed for pass blocking, so the Cowboys replaced him at left tackle with Larry Allen in passing downs situations.

=== Philadelphia Eagles ===
On February 19, 1998, he signed a four-year contract as a free agent with the Philadelphia Eagles. The Eagles used him at right guard, where he started six games.

The next year, with the arrival of new head coach Andy Reid, he walked out of training camp for one day, after being told of his demotion in favor of rookie Doug Brzezinski. When he came back, Reid made him push a blocking sled the length of a practice field under the heat, in front of some players, coaches, executives and the media. He eventually was cut on September 4, 1999.

=== Tampa Bay Buccaneers ===
On November 10, 1999, he signed with the Tampa Bay Buccaneers and backed up both offensive tackle positions for two seasons. He made two starts during his time with the team, including the 2000 Wild-Card playoff loss against the Philadelphia Eagles, where he was overmatched at left tackle playing against Pro Bowler Hugh Douglas. He was released on September 2, 2001.

== Personal life ==
Hegamin works as the Senior Manager of Players Services for the NFL Players Association. He is also the offensive lineman coach at the Under Armour National Combine and Elite Football Camp. Current OL Coach at IMG Academy in FL. He is now on the staff of the Colorado Buffalos under Coach Prime.
