= Henry Lusk =

American football player (born 1972)

No. 88, 83
- Position: Tight end

Personal information
- Born: May 8, 1972 (age 54); Seaside, California, U.S.
- Listed height: 6 ft 2 in (1.88 m)
- Listed weight: 245 lb (111 kg)

Career information
- High school: Monterey (Monterey, California)
- College: Utah
- NFL draft: 1996: 7th round, 246th overall pick

Career history
- New Orleans Saints (1996); New York Jets (1997)*; Green Bay Packers (1997)*; Washington Redskins (1998)*; Miami Dolphins (1998); Washington Redskins (1999)*; New England Patriots (1999)*; Tampa Bay Buccaneers (2000)*
- * Offseason or practice squad member only

Awards and highlights
- Second-team All-WAC (1993)

Career NFL statistics
- Receptions: 27
- Receiving yards: 210
- Rushing yards: 7
- Stats at Pro Football Reference

Hendrick Hamilton Lusk (born May 8, 1972) is an American former professional football player who was a tight end for two seasons for the New Orleans Saints, Green Bay Packers and Miami Dolphins of the National Football League (NFL). He was selected in the seventh round of the 1996 NFL draft. In 2010, Lusk became the head coach of the John F. Kennedy High School football team in Sacramento, California. He resigned from coaching John F. Kennedy High School due to a lewd photo of him surfacing.

Lusk was a high school football coach for Murray High School in Salt Lake City, Utah. He began coaching at Desert Hills High School, and won the 3AA state championship in 2016. In 2017, Lusk became the head coach of the Monterey High School football team, the school which he attended.
