= Hillary Butler =

American football player (born 1971)

No. 55, 57
- Position: Linebacker

Personal information
- Born: January 5, 1971 (age 55); San Francisco, California

Career information
- High school: Lakes (Lakewood, Washington)
- College: Washington
- NFL draft: 1994: undrafted

Career history
- Seattle Seahawks (1994)*; Jacksonville Jaguars (1995)*; Frankfurt Galaxy (1996–1998); Denver Broncos (1997-1998)*; Seattle Seahawks (1998); Denver Broncos (2000)*
- * Offseason or practice squad member only

Awards and highlights
- Super Bowl champion (XXXII); All-World League (1997); All-NFL Europe (1998)
- Stats at Pro Football Reference

Hillary Dourtha Butler (born January 5, 1971) is a retired professional American football linebacker who played in the National Football League and the NFL Europe League. In his four-year pro career he played for the Seattle Seahawks of the NFL, Frankfurt Galaxy of NFL Europe and a member of the SB XXXIII Denver Broncos. Hillary was on the field during the Terrell Davis breakout year of 2,000 + yard season. Butler played college football at the University of Washington. He now is the coach at Lakes High School in Washington
