= Ray Ethridge =

American gridiron football player (born 1968)

No. 6, 85, 86
- Position: Wide receiver

Personal information
- Born: September 11, 1968 (age 58); San Diego, California, U.S.
- Listed height: 5 ft 10 in (1.78 m)
- Listed weight: 180 lb (82 kg)

Career information
- High school: Crawford (San Diego, California)
- College: Pasadena City College
- NFL draft: 1992: 3rd round, 63rd overall pick

Career history
- BC Lions (1991); San Diego Chargers (1992); Cleveland Browns (1995)*; Carolina Panthers (1995)*; Cleveland Browns (1995); Baltimore Ravens (1996–1997); San Diego Chargers (1999)*
- * Offseason or practice squad member only

Career NFL statistics
- Receptions: 43
- Receiving yards: 421
- GP / GS: 32 / 10
- Stats at Pro Football Reference

Career CFL statistics
- Receptions: 18
- Receiving yards: 200
- Kickoff / Punt returns: 16 / 8
- KO / Punt return yards: 402 / 75
- Total touchdowns: 2

Raymond Arthur Ethridge Jr. (born September 11, 1968) is an American former professional football player who was a wide receiver in the National Football League (NFL). He played college football at Pasadena City College. He was selected by the San Diego Chargers in the third round of the 1992 NFL draft.

== Early life ==
Ethridge was born in San Diego, but moved to Texas in seventh grade. He returned to San Diego in 12th grade and enrolled at Crawford. After finishing third in the 100, second in the 200 and fourth in the 400 relay at the state championship track meet. As a senior, he out ran future Cleveland Browns wide receiver Patrick Rowe.

== College career ==
After playing football at Pasadena City College at the urging of NFL wide receiver Anthony Miller, signed a letter of intent to attend New Mexico State but instead chose to play in the Canadian Football League.

== Professional career ==
=== Canadian Football League ===
In his lone season playing for the BC Lions in the Canadian Football League, Ethridge played in six games and caught 18 passes for 200 yards and a touchdown. He eventually asked for and was granted his release so that he could try out for the NFL. While in Canada, he beat Raghib "Rocket" Ismail in a 100-meter race.

=== National Football League ===
Ethridge was selected in the third round (63rd overall) of the 1992 NFL draft by the San Diego Chargers.

On September 5, 1995 he was signed by the Cleveland Browns to their practice squad. He then spent the 1996 and 1997 season with the Baltimore Ravens, during which he played in 16 games with one start and caught two passes for 24-yards. He re-joined the Chargers in the late 1990s and was released on June 16, 1999.

== Personal life ==
Ethridge has at least two children .
