= Ron Collins Jr =

American football player (born 1971)

Ron Collins
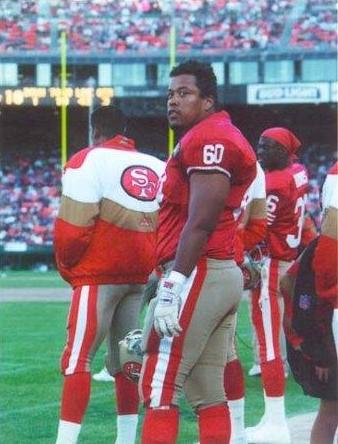

No. 60, 76, 67, 79
- Position: OL

Personal information
- Born: September 30, 1971 (age 55) (United States) Tokyo, Japan
- Listed height: 6 ft 5 in (1.96 m)
- Listed weight: 305 lb (138 kg)

Career information
- High school: Cajon (San Bernardino, CA)
- College: Fresno State

Career history
- 1994: San Francisco 49ers
- 1995: Jacksonville Jaguars
- 1996 to 1997: Frankfurt Galaxy
- 1997: Indianapolis Colts
- 1997: Miami Dolphins
- 1997: Chicago Bears

Awards and highlights
- Second-team All-WAC (1993)

Ron Collins (born September 30, 1971) is a former professional American football player.

Ron was born in Tokyo, Japan, and played as an offensive lineman with the NFL Europe's Frankfurt Galaxy in their 1996 and 1997 seasons. He also played in the NFL off-season and on NFL practice squads with the San Francisco 49ers, Jacksonville Jaguars, Indianapolis Colts, Miami Dolphins, Chicago Bears. In college, Collins played for the Fresno State Bulldogs.
