= Ray Wilson (American football) =

American football player (born 1971)

No. 42, 35
- Position: Safety

Personal information
- Born: August 26, 1971 (age 55); Panama City, Florida, U.S.
- Listed height: 6 ft 1 in (1.85 m)
- Listed weight: 202 lb (92 kg)

Career information
- High school: A. Crawford Mosley (Florida)
- College: New Mexico
- NFL draft: 1994: undrafted

Career history
- New Orleans Saints (1994); Green Bay Packers (1994)

Awards and highlights
- First-team All-WAC (1993)

Career NFL statistics
- Games played: 6
- Stats at Pro Football Reference

Ray Wilson (born August 26, 1971) is a former safety in the National Football League (NFL). Wilson was born on August 26, 1971, in Panama City, Florida where he attended A. Crawford Mosley High School. After high school, Wilson was signed by Auburn University to play college football, although he ended up not passing his ACT and was unable to attend Auburn. Instead, he went to Pearl River Junior College for two years before transferring to the University of New Mexico where he played for their college football team. During his first season at New Mexico, he was the starting safety for all 11 games and recorded 94 tackles, the 12th most in the Western Athletic Conference that season. He was named a team captain for his senior season. His senior year, he became the lead tackler in the entire Western Athletic Conference and had three interceptions.

Wilson split the 1994 NFL season between the New Orleans Saints and the Green Bay Packers. He played in the first three games of the seasons for the Saints before being released. After signing to the Packers' Wilson was activated to the Packers full squad in late November 1994. He played for the Packers for the remainder of the season, although he was due to an injury inactive to the game day roster for two of the five games that he was on the team.
