= Jeff Wilner =

American football player (born 1971)

No. 83, 49, 85, 41
- Position: Tight end

Personal information
- Born: December 31, 1971 (age 54); East Meadowbrook, New York, U.S.
- Listed height: 6 ft 5 in (1.96 m)
- Listed weight: 255 lb (116 kg)

Career information
- High school: Phillips Exeter Academy
- College: Wesleyan
- NFL draft: 1994: undrafted

Career history
- Green Bay Packers (1994); New England Patriots (1995)*; Green Bay Packers (1995); Denver Broncos (1995); Barcelona Dragons (1997)
- * Offseason or practice squad member only

Career NFL statistics
- Receptions: 5
- Receiving yards: 31
- Stats at Pro Football Reference

Jeffrey Scott Wilner (December 31, 1971) is a former tight end in the National Football League (NFL).

== Biography ==
Wilner was born on December 31, 1971, in East Meadowbrook, New York.

He graduated from Phillips Exeter Academy and played college football at Wesleyan University where he was teammates with future NFL coach Eric Mangini. Wilner was the first graduate of the university to play in the NFL.

== College career ==
In 1990, as a freshman, Wilner recorded four receptions for 27 yards and one touchdown while playing tight end for coach Kevin Spencer.

After spending his sophomore year playing offensive tackle, Wilner returned to tight end for his junior season, recording 12 receptions for 163 yards and one touchdown.

As a senior, Wilner recorded 28 receptions for 245 yards and three touchdowns at tight end. Additionally, he recorded three blocked PAT attempts and one blocked punt, which he returned 50 yards for a touchdown.

== Professional career ==
Wilner was signed as an undrafted free agent by the Green Bay Packers in 1994. As a rookie, Wilner played in 11 games and started one. Filling in for injured starter Mark Chmura, he finished the season with five receptions for 31 yards and no touchdowns.

Wilner began his sophomore campaign with the Packers, but was subsequently traded to the New England Patriots, and was cut by the Patriots before the season started. Wilner would then sign with the Packers and play two games for them. He was then released by the Packers. He would then sign with the Denver Broncos. While in Denver, he did not see any playing time during a regular season game. After being released by the Broncos, he was later drafted by the Barcelona Dragons of the World League of American Football (WLAF), but was unable to play due to injury.
