= Theo Adams (American football) =

American football player (born 1966)

No. 61, 73
- Position: Guard

Personal information
- Born: April 24, 1966 (age 60); San Francisco, California, U.S.
- Listed height: 6 ft 4 in (1.93 m)
- Listed weight: 300 lb (136 kg)

Career information
- High school: Honolulu (HI) McKinley
- College: Hawaii
- NFL draft: 1990: undrafted

Career history
- Los Angeles Rams (1990)*; London Monarchs (1991); Los Angeles Rams (1991)*; Seattle Seahawks (1991-1992); → London Monarchs (1992); Tampa Bay Buccaneers (1993); Philadelphia Eagles (1994)*; San Francisco 49ers (1995)*; Philadelphia Eagles (1995); Frankfurt Galaxy (1996); San Jose SaberCats (1996–1997)
- * Offseason or practice squad member only
- Stats at Pro Football Reference
- Stats at ArenaFan.com

Theo P. Adams (born April 24, 1966) is an American former professional football player who was an offensive lineman in the National Football League (NFL). He played college football for the Hawaii Warriors before signing as an undrafted free agent by the Los Angeles Rams. He was part of the inaugural London Monarchs team that won the World Bowl '91. Adams later played for the NFL's Seattle Seahawks and Tampa Bay Buccaneers.
