= Johnnie Barnes =

American football player (born 1968)

No. 19, 85, 80
- Position: Wide receiver

Personal information
- Born: July 21, 1968 (age 58); Suffolk, Virginia, U.S.
- Listed height: 6 ft 1 in (1.85 m)
- Listed weight: 185 lb (84 kg)

Career information
- College: Hampton
- NFL draft: 1992: 9th round, 231st overall pick

Career history
- San Diego Chargers (1992–1994); Pittsburgh Steelers (1995); Amsterdam Admirals (1997); Milwaukee Mustangs (1998)

Career NFL statistics
- Receptions: 14
- Receiving yards: 191
- Stats at Pro Football Reference

Johnnie Darnell Barnes (born July 21, 1968) is an American former professional football player who was a wide receiver for four seasons in the National Football League (NFL). He played college football for the Hampton Pirates. He was selected in the ninth round of the 1992 NFL draft by the San Diego Chargers, for whom he played three seasons. He then spent one season with the Pittsburgh Steelers. Following his NFL career, Barnes played for the Amsterdam Admirals of NFL Europe.
