= Anthony Miller (wide receiver, born 1965) =

American football player (born 1965)

No. 83
- Position: Wide receiver

Personal information
- Born: April 15, 1965 (age 61); Pasadena, California, U.S.
- Listed height: 5 ft 11 in (1.80 m)
- Listed weight: 190 lb (86 kg)

Career information
- High school: John Muir (Pasadena)
- College: Tennessee
- NFL draft: 1988: 1st round, 15th overall pick

Career history
- San Diego Chargers (1988–1993); Denver Broncos (1994–1996); Dallas Cowboys (1997)

Awards and highlights
- 5× Pro Bowl (1989, 1990, 1992, 1993, 1995)

Career NFL statistics
- Games played: 155
- Receptions: 595
- Receiving yards: 9,148
- Receiving touchdowns: 63
- Stats at Pro Football Reference

Lawrence Anthony Miller (born April 15, 1965) is an American former professional football player who was a wide receiver in the National Football League (NFL) for the San Diego Chargers, Denver Broncos and Dallas Cowboys. He played college football for the Tennessee Volunteers. In 10 seasons as a player, Miller had five 1,000-yard seasons, and he was the second player with a career of only 10 seasons with five 1,000-yard seasons.

== Early life ==
Miller attended John Muir High School in Pasadena, California, where he was a track standout, winning the 400 metres at the CIF Southern Section meet in 1983. He also competed in the long jump, 100 metres (10.3 seconds), 200 metres (20.6 seconds) and relay events.

He joined a football team for the first time in his life as a senior, at the urging of head coach Jim Brownfield. He registered 13 receptions for 230 yards and 2 touchdowns, but didn't generate much interest from recruiters. He also practiced basketball.

== College career ==
Miller initially accepted a track and field scholarship from San Diego State, but transferred after one semester to Pasadena City College, when the coaches refused to allow him to play football in addition to running track.

In 1985, he became the state junior-college champion in the 100- and 200-meter distances. He also had a breakout year in football, catching 47 passes for 881 yards and nine touchdowns, a long rushing touchdown and 25 kicks returned for 786 yards. His 1,728 all-purpose yards led all California junior-college players, and he was named to the junior-college All-American team.

Miller played at the University of Tennessee during an era when the school garnered its reputation as "Wide Receiver U," with receivers such as Anthony Hancock, Willie Gault and Tim McGee preceding Miller as first-round NFL draft picks. Three of Miller's wide-receiver teammates at Tennessee— Joey Clinkscales, Alvin Harper and Anthony Morgan— would also become NFL draftees. Despite consistent competition for playing time, Miller amassed 765 yards and five touchdowns on 47 catches in just 17 games for the Volunteers, and returned 25 kickoffs for 547 yards.

Splitting time with Clinkscales during the 1986 season, Miller caught 36 passes for a team-leading 667 yards and five touchdowns, and returned 24 kickoffs for 522 yards. In his debut against New Mexico, he caught five passes for 80 yards and caught five passes for 66 yards in his SEC debut against Mississippi State. In Tennessee's loss to Auburn, Miller provided the Volunteers' lone touchdown, catching a screen pass from Randy Sanders and racing 60 yards to the end zone. Miller caught a 70-yard touchdown pass and returned six kickoffs for a school-record 126 yards in Tennessee's loss to Alabama. He had a 44-yard touchdown catch against Memphis State, and caught touchdown passes of 51 yards and 50 yards against Vanderbilt. He caught six passes for 72 yards in Tennessee's 21–14 win over Minnesota in the 1986 Liberty Bowl.

During the 1987 season, Miller injured his knee in the opener against Iowa, missing five games and struggling with injuries throughout the season. Playing sparingly in just six games, he finished the regular season with 11 catches for 98 yards, and returned only one kickoff for 25 yards. In Tennessee's 27–22 win over Indiana in the 1988 Peach Bowl, Miller caught five passes for 78 yards, including a 45-yard touchdown reception in the first quarter.

== Professional career ==
Pre-draft measurables
Height	Weight	Hand span	40-yard dash	10-yard split	20-yard split	20-yard shuttle	Vertical jump	Broad jump	Bench press
5 ft 10 5/8 in (1.79 m)	181 lb (82 kg)	8 1/2 in (0.22 m)	4.38 s	1.62 s	2.59 s	4.20 s	32.0 in (0.81 m)	9 ft 3 in (2.82 m)	14 reps

=== San Diego Chargers ===
Although some NFL teams were concerned with Miller's knee injury, he was selected by the San Diego Chargers in the first round (15th overall) of the 1988 NFL draft. He became a starter opposite fellow rookie Quinn Early, posting 36 receptions (tied for second on the team) for 526 yards (second on the team), three receiving touchdowns and a 25.9 kickoff return average (second on the team).

In 1989, he had a breakout performance and one of the best seasons in franchise history, leading the team with 75 receptions for 1,252 yards and 10 receiving touchdowns, receiving Pro Bowl honors. He was specially effective in the second half of the season, when he tallied 47 receptions and seven touchdowns in eight games. He also took part in the NFL's "Fastest Man" competition, placing second to Darrell Green. The next year, he led the team with 63 receptions for 933 yards and seven receiving touchdowns.

In 1991, he missed the last three games with an injury, recording 44 receptions (second on the team) for 649 yards (led the team) and three receiving touchdowns (tied for the team lead). The next year, he underwent arthroscopic knee surgery before training camp that caused him to start slow, but recovered to post 72 receptions for 1,060 yards (led the AFC) and seven receiving touchdowns.

In 1993, he had 84 receptions for 1,162 yards and seven receiving touchdowns.

Miller was a finalist in 2012 for induction into the San Diego Chargers Hall of Fame, but lost to punter Darren Bennett in the fan vote.

=== Denver Broncos ===
On March 17, 1994, Miller was signed as a free agent by the Denver Broncos to replace wide receiver Vance Johnson. Miller became just the fourth player in franchise history to reach 1,000 receiving yards in a season by registering 60 receptions (third on the team) for 1,107 yards (led the team) and five receiving touchdowns (led the team). It was also the first time in club history that two receivers (Miller and Shannon Sharpe) recorded 1,000 yards each in the same season.

In 1995, although he missed two games with injuries, Miller had 59 receptions (second on the team) for 1,079 yards (led the team) and set a franchise record with 14 receiving touchdowns (also accomplished in 2013 by Demaryius Thomas).

In 1996, Miller started 16 games, posting 56 receptions for 735 yards and three touchdowns. On June 2, 1997, he was surprisingly released in a salary-cap move after the team gave third-year receiver Rod Smith the starting position.

=== Dallas Cowboys ===
On June 2, 1997, Miller signed as a free agent with the Dallas Cowboys as a complement to Michael Irvin and to replace the recently departed Kevin Williams. Miller missed all of training camp and most of the preseason while recovering from arthroscopic knee surgery performed during the offseason. Although he was limited with injuries, he still posted 16 starts, 46 receptions (third on the team) for 645 yards (second on the team) and four receiving touchdowns (second on the team). However, the Cowboys did not sign him to a new contract after the season.

== NFL career statistics ==
Year	Team	Games		Receiving					Rushing					Kickoff returns				
Year	Team	GP	GS	Rec	Yds	Avg	Lng	TD	Att	Yds	Avg	Lng	TD	Ret	Yds	Avg	Lng	TD
1988	SD	16	15	36	526	14.6	49	3	7	45	6.4	20	0	25	648	25.9	93	1
1989	SD	16	16	75	1,252	16.7	69	10	4	21	5.3	24	0	21	533	25.4	91	1
1990	SD	16	16	63	933	14.8	31	7	3	13	4.3	10	0	1	13	13.0	13	0
1991	SD	13	12	44	649	14.8	58	3	—	—	—	—	—	—	—	—	—	—
1992	SD	16	16	72	1,060	14.7	67	7	1	−1	−1.0	−1	0	1	33	33.0	33	0
1993	SD	16	16	84	1,162	13.8	66	7	1	0	0.0	0	0	2	42	21.0	29	0
1994	DEN	16	15	60	1,107	18.5	76	5	1	3	3.0	3	0	—	—	—	—	—
1995	DEN	14	14	59	1,079	18.3	62	14	1	5	5.0	5	0	—	—	—	—	—
1996	DEN	16	16	56	735	13.1	46	3	3	39	13.0	26	1	—	—	—	—	—
1997	DAL	16	16	46	645	14.0	54	4	1	6	6.0	6	0	—	—	—	—	—
Career		155	152	595	9,148	15.4	76	63	22	131	6.0	26	1	50	1,269	25.4	93	2
