= Wes Bender =

American football player (1970–2018)

Profile
- Position: Running back

Personal information
- Born: August 2, 1970; Van Nuys, California
- Died: March 5, 2018 (aged 47)
- Listed height: 5 ft 10 in (1.78 m)
- Listed weight: 242 lb (110 kg)

Career information
- High school: Burroughs (Burbank, California)
- College: USC
- NFL draft: 1993: undrafted

Career history
- Kansas City Chiefs (1993); Los Angeles Raiders (1994); Frankfurt Galaxy (1996); Oakland Raiders (1996)*; New Orleans Saints (1997)
- * Offseason or practice squad member only
- Stats at Pro Football Reference

Wesley Todd Bender (August 2, 1970 – March 5, 2018) was an American football running back in the National Football League who played for the Los Angeles Raiders and New Orleans Saints. He played college football for the USC Trojans.

Bender died on March 5, 2018. He was one of at least 345 NFL players to be diagnosed after death with chronic traumatic encephalopathy (CTE), caused by repeated hits to the head. He was interred at Forest Lawn Memorial Park (Hollywood Hills).
