= Sean Vanhorse =

American football player (born 1968)

No. 25, 29, 37
- Position: Cornerback

Personal information
- Born: July 22, 1968 (age 58); Baltimore, Maryland, U.S.
- Listed height: 5 ft 10 in (1.78 m)
- Listed weight: 180 lb (82 kg)

Career information
- High school: Northwestern (Baltimore)
- College: Howard
- NFL draft: 1990: 6th round, 151 (by the Miami Dolphins)th overall pick

Career history
- Miami Dolphins (1990); Detroit Lions (1991); San Diego Chargers (1992–1994); Detroit Lions (1995); Minnesota Vikings (1996)

Career NFL statistics
- Tackles: 134
- Interceptions: 6
- Touchdowns: 1
- Stats at Pro Football Reference

Sean Joseph Vanhorse (born July 22, 1968) is an American former professional football player who was a cornerback for five seasons with the San Diego Chargers, Detroit Lions, and Minnesota Vikings of the National Football League (NFL). He played college football for the Howard Bison. He was selected by the Miami Dolphins in the sixth round of the 1990 NFL draft with the 151st overall pick.

Vanhorse is living in Alpharetta, Georgia, with his wife Juliee, and has two children, Sydne and Solomon. Solomon, is a running back at Indiana University.
