= Charles Hope (American football) =

American football player (born 1970)

No. 70, 64
- Position: Guard

Personal information
- Born: March 12, 1970 (age 56); Wilmington, Delaware, U.S.
- Listed height: 6 ft 3 in (1.91 m)
- Listed weight: 303 lb (137 kg)

Career information
- High school: William Penn (New Castle, Delaware)
- College: Central State (OH)
- NFL draft: 1992: undrafted

Career history
- Miami Dolphins (1992-1993)*; Green Bay Packers (1993–1994); Frankfurt Galaxy (1996)
- * Offseason or practice squad member only

Career NFL statistics
- Games played: 6
- Stats at Pro Football Reference

Charles Hope (born 1970) is a former offensive guard in the National Football League.

== Biography ==
Hope was born Charles Edward Hope on March 12, 1970 in Wilmington, Delaware and is a graduate of William Penn High School in New Castle, Delaware. Actively cheers for the Buffalo Bills.

== Career ==
Hope played with the Green Bay Packers during the 1994 NFL season. He played college football at Central State University.
