= Eric Jonassen =

American football player (born 1968)

No. 74
- Position: Offensive tackle

Personal information
- Born: August 16, 1968 (age 58); Baltimore, Maryland, U.S.
- Listed height: 6 ft 5 in (1.96 m)
- Listed weight: 310 lb (141 kg)

Career information
- High school: Mount Saint Joseph (Baltimore)
- College: Penn State; Bloomsburg
- NFL draft: 1992: 5th round, 140th overall pick

Career history
- San Diego Chargers (1992–1994); Atlanta Falcons (1995)*; Philadelphia Eagles (1996)*; Arizona Cardinals (1996–1997)
- * Offseason or practice squad member only

Career NFL statistics
- Games played: 32
- Games started: 2
- Stats at Pro Football Reference

Eric Jonassen (born August 16, 1968) is an American former professional football player who was a tackle in the National Football League (NFL). He played for the San Diego Chargers from 1993 to 1994. He was selected by the Chargers in the fifth round of the 1992 NFL draft. He played college football for the Penn State Nittany Lions and Bloomsburg Huskies.
