= 1994 San Diego Chargers season =

NFL team 35th season

- Owner: Alex Spanos
- General manager: Bobby Beathard
- Head coach: Bobby Ross
- Offensive coordinator: Ralph Friedgen
- Defensive coordinator: Bill Arnsparger
- Home stadium: Jack Murphy Stadium

Results
- Record: 11–5
- Division place: 1st AFC West
- Playoffs: Won Divisional Playoffs (vs. Dolphins) 22–21; Won AFC Championship (at Steelers) 17–13; Lost Super Bowl XXIX (vs. 49ers) 26–49
- All-Pros: 3: K John Carney (1st team); DE Leslie O'Neal (2nd team); LB Junior Seau (1st team)
- Pro Bowlers: 4: K John Carney; RB Natrone Means; DE Leslie O'Neal; LB Junior Seau

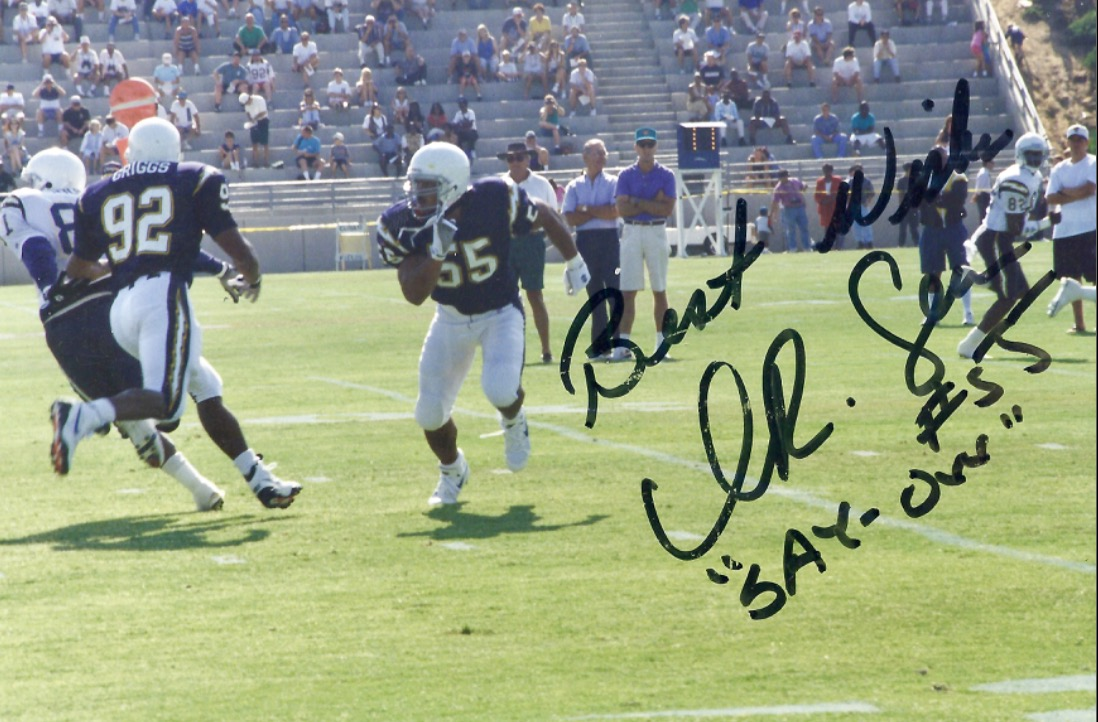
Signed photograph of Junior Seau (#55) at Charger training camp - also pictured are Tony Martin (#81), David Griggs (#92) and Mark Seay (#82)

The 1994 San Diego Chargers season was the team's 35th, its 25th in the National Football League (NFL) and its 34th in San Diego. It featured a surprising run to Super Bowl XXIX, where the Chargers lost to the San Francisco 49ers. To date, this is the only Super Bowl appearance in franchise history.

The 1994 season began with the team trying to improve on their 8–8 record in 1993. The offense underwent a major overhaul, with the club leaders in rushing and receiving yards (Marion Butts and Anthony Miller) both traded during the offseason. Second-year running back Natrone Means took over the lead rusher role, setting a club record with 1,350 yards during the regular season. At wide receiver, the trio of Tony Martin, Shawn Jefferson and Mark Seay combined for over 2,000 yards. On defense, Junior Seau and Leslie O'Neal repeated as the club leaders in tackles and sacks respectively; Stanley Richard ran two of his four interceptions back for touchdowns. Future All-Pro safety Rodney Harrison joined the team as a fifth-round draft pick but primarily played on special teams, where the Chargers had four touchdowns on kick returns and John Carney led the league in scoring. It was the franchise's first season with long snapper David Binn on the roster. He would play seventeen seasons as a Charger, a franchise record.

San Diego won their first six games en route to an 11–5 record and were crowned AFC West champions. In the playoffs, they defeated the Miami Dolphins 22–21 after trailing 21–6 at halftime, then they produced an upset 17–13 victory over the Pittsburgh Steelers in the AFC Championship Game having trailed 13–3 in the 3rd quarter. They advanced to Super Bowl XXIX, only to lose to the heavily favored San Francisco 49ers 49–26 at Joe Robbie Stadium.

== Offseason ==
=== Departures and arrivals ===
1994 was the first season in which the NFL used a salary cap; it was set at $33.8 million. This created a new challenge for teams trying to retain their top players and to a major turnover of personnel in San Diego, with ten starters from 1993 cut, traded or leaving through free agency.

Guard Mike Zandofsky was the first to depart, signing as a free agent with the Atlanta Falcons on March 5. Four days later, general manager Bobby Beathard avoided losing Center Courtney Hall to free agency when the player agreed to a three-year contract, but cut starting tight end Derrick Walker on the same day to save cap space. The Chargers also made acquisitions through free agency, bringing in cornerback Dwayne Harper from the Seattle Seahawks (he replaced Donald Frank, who Beathard traded for a 6th-round draft pick shortly afterwards), linebacker David Griggs from the Miami Dolphins (replacing Jerrol Williams), and defensive tackle Reuben Davis from the Arizona Cardinals (replacing Blaise Winter).

While Beathard signed Pro Bowl linebacker Junior Seau to a new contract early in the offseason, starting middle linebacker Gary Plummer joined the San Francisco 49ers on March 23. Plummer had spent eight years with the Chargers, appearing in every game since the start of 1988, but Beathard was unable to match San Francisco's offer due to the salary cap; Plummer said, "If I had my choice, I would be playing in San Diego this year." The Chargers replaced Plummer with Dennis Gibson, a seven-year veteran who had spent his entire career with the Detroit Lions and was credited with 479 tackles, (Note: Tackles are an unofficial statistic tracked by the team in question.) the ninth-most in the history of that franchise. In contrast to Plummer, defensive end Burt Grossman asked to be traded after hearing a report that the team were considering offloading him to stay under the cap; Grossman had been the team's first-round draft pick in 1988. Beathard eventually did trade him, receiving a sixth-round draft pick from the Philadelphia Eagles in exchange.

"If the Chargers win the division, run through the playoffs, go to the Super Bowl, Beathard looks like the smartest man in the NFL. If the Chargers lose—and especially if Miller and the Broncos win—some will point to it as one of the worst decisions Beathard ever made."

— The Escondido Times-Advocate on Bobby Beathard's decision not to re-sign Anthony Miller, April 1, 1994.

San Diego's second-leading wide receiver from 1993, Nate Lewis, was traded to the Los Angeles Rams for a fourth-round pick on March 18; on the same day, top wide receiver Anthony Miller signed an offer sheet from the Denver Broncos for $10.5 million over four years. As Miller had the Chargers' transition tag, this required them to match the offer within a week to retain the player, whose 1993 salary had been only $1 million. Beathard took what the local Escondido Times-Advocate termed his "biggest gamble... since he arrived in San Diego" on March 25 when he let Miller go to the Broncos, a division rival. Miller had made four Pro Bowls during his six years in San Diego, and ranked second in the AFC for both receptions and receiving yardage the previous year. San Diego had picked up potential replacements in Vance Johnson (a nine-year veteran with the Broncos with a recent history of injuries) and Tony Martin (a backup for the bulk of his four years in Miami). Johnson was injured again during training camp and cut in preseason, but Martin won a roster spot and averaged over 1,000 per season during a four-year stint with the Chargers.

The final starter to leave was running back Marion Butts on April 25; he was a two-time Pro Bowler who had led the team in rushing through each of the previous five seasons. After Beathard was unable to rework Butts' contract to save cap space, he was traded to the New England Patriots in exchange for the teams swapping third-round draft picks. This left Natrone Means entering his second NFL season as the featured running back. Speaking on the roster changes, head coach Bobby Ross said,

Offensively, we have question marks... the big one is Anthony. He is the big play guy. We don't know how we'll do there.

=== NFL draft ===
San Diego had no first-round pick, as Beathard had traded it for a second round selection in the previous year's draft. They did have two second-round picks in 1994, both of which Beathard used on offensive linemen, explaining, "You better have some young offensive linemen coming up or you are going to be in trouble." Guard Isaac Davis was mostly a backup in 1994, eventually starting 29 games over four seasons with the Chargers; Tackle Vaughn Parker also saw little action as a rookie, but went on to have a 10-season, 107-start career in San Diego. Andre Coleman, chosen in the third round, was a wide receiver noted for his ability as a kick returner. He made an immediate impact in the latter role, scoring three kickoff return touchdowns as a rookie, including one in the Super Bowl, then followed up with three more return touchdowns in 1995, though he was gone from the team after only one more season.

Beathard also found a significant player in the fifth round, selecting Safety Rodney Harrison with the 145th overall pick. Harrison was noted as a hard hitter who lacked discipline by draft analysts Mel Kiper and Joel Buchsbaum. He maintained his reputation for physical play through an NFL career that lasted fifteen seasons (the first nine with San Diego), and was named the Chargers' best late-round steal in a 2016 ESPN article. Harrison was named to two Pro Bowls and one Associated Press All-Pro first team while in San Diego, and went on to be voted to their 50th Anniversary Team in 2009.

Among the Chargers' undrafted rookie signings was long snapper David Binn. He went on to appear in a franchise-record 256 games over the next seventeen seasons.

1994 San Diego Chargers draft
Round	Pick	Player	Position	College	Notes
2	43	Isaac Davis	Guard	Arkansas	
2	63	Vaughn Parker	Offensive tackle	UCLA	
3	70	Andre Coleman	Wide receiver	Kansas State	
3	82	Willie Clark	Cornerback	Notre Dame	
5	137	Aaron Laing	Tight end	New Mexico State	
5	145	Rodney Harrison *	Safety	Western Illinois	
5	150	Darren Krein	Defensive end	Miami (FL)	
5	160	Tony Vinson	Running back	Towson	
7	207	Zane Beehn	Linebacker	Kentucky	
Made roster * Made at least one Pro Bowl during career

== Personnel ==
=== Staff ===
1994 San Diego Chargers staff
Front office: Chairman of the board and president – Alex Spanos; Vice chairman – Dean Spanos; General manager – Bobby Beathard; Assistant general manager – Dick Daniels; Director of player personnel – Billy Devaney; Director of pro personnel – Rudy Feldman; Director of college scouting – John Hinek; Coordinator of football operations – Marty Hurney; Head coaches: Head coach – Bobby Ross; Offensive coaches: Offensive coordinator – Ralph Friedgen; Quarterbacks – Dwain Painter; Offensive backs – Sylvester Croom; Wide receivers – Jerry Sullivan; Tight ends/h-backs – Frank Falks; Offensive line – Carl Mauck; Offense and special teams assistant – Stan Kwan; Quality control – John Misciagna	Defensive coaches: Defensive coordinator – Bill Arnsparger; Defensive line – Dennis Murphy; Linebackers – Dale Lindsey; Secondary – Willie Shaw; Defense assistant – Kevin O'Dea; Special teams coaches: Special teams – Chuck Priefer; Strength and conditioning: Strength and conditioning – John Dunn; Strength and conditioning assistant – Chip Morton

=== Roster ===
1994 San Diego Chargers roster
Quarterbacks (QB): 11 Jeff Brohm; 13 Gale Gilbert; 12 Stan Humphries; Running backs (RB): 32 Eric Bieniemy; 35 Rodney Culver; 33 Ronnie Harmon; 20 Natrone Means; Wide receivers (WR): 85 Johnnie Barnes; 83 Andre Coleman; 80 Shawn Jefferson; 81 Tony Martin; 82 Mark Seay; Tight ends (TE): 84 Aaron Laing; 89 Shannon Mitchell; 86 Alfred Pupunu; 87 Duane Young	Offensive linemen (OL): 67 Stan Brock T; 68 Joe Cocozzo G; 73 Isaac Davis G; 60 Greg Engel C; 53 Courtney Hall C; 74 Eric Jonassen T; 71 Joe Milinichik G; 70 Vaughn Parker G; 72 Harry Swayne T; 64 Curtis Whitley C; Defensive linemen (DL): 93 Reuben Davis DT; 99 Raylee Johnson DE; 98 Shawn Lee DT; 95 Les Miller DT; 94 Chris Mims DE; 91 Leslie O'Neal DE; 97 John Parrella DT; 79 Cornell Thomas DE; 90 Reggie White DT	Linebackers (LB): 58 Lewis Bush OLB; 57 Dennis Gibson MLB; 92 David Griggs OLB; 34 Steve Hendrickson; 54 Doug Miller MLB; 55 Junior Seau OLB; Defensive backs (DB): 29 Darren Carrington SS; 44 Eric Castle FS; 31 Willie Clark CB; 21 Darrien Gordon CB/PR; 28 Dwayne Harper CB; 37 Rodney Harrison SS; 24 Stanley Richard FS; 25 Sean Vanhorse CB; 43 Lonnie Young FS; Special teams (ST): 50 David Binn LS; 3 John Carney K; 9 Bryan Wagner P	Practice squad: 2 Darren Bennett P; 63 Raymond Smoot G; 17 Chris Thomas WR; 45 Tony Vinson RB; 59 Glen Young LB; Reserve: 66 Earnest Greene T (IR); 56 Darren Krein LB (IR); 88 Deems May TE (IR); 77 Eric Moten G (PUP); 96 Blaise Winter DT (IR); Rookies in italics 53 active, 5 reserve, 5 practice squad

== Preseason ==
The Chargers began their preseason by playing in the annual Pro Football Hall of Fame Game. Means took his first preseason carry for 43 yards, and Stan Humphries completed his first pass for 36 yards and a touchdown to Shawn Jefferson; later, Willie Clark added an 86-yard interception return touchdown, but the Charger backups generated little offense once they entered the game and Atlanta won 21–17. The following week, San Diego turned the ball over five times and their receivers dropped numerous passes in a one-sided loss to Houston. Next, the Chargers played an American Bowl game in Germany; Mark Seay and Eric Bieniemy scored first half touchdowns, but San Diego lost 28–20 after Coleman's late turnover led to a key New York Giants touchdown.

San Diego started 0–4 in a preseason campaign for the first time in their history after their 30–24 loss to San Francisco. Their starting offense produced touchdowns for Jefferson and Martin, and backup quarterback Gale Gilbert's touchdown pass to Ronnie Harmon put the Chargers up by eight points before San Francisco came from behind with reserve players in for both sides. The Chargers managed to avoid a winless record with their 24–6 win over the Los Angeles Rams. Ross praised the sharp play of Humphries, who threw touchdowns to Seay and Jefferson in the first half; Gilbert added one to H-Back Alfred Pupunu in an easy victory.

1994 preseason games
Week	Date	Opponent	Result	Record	Venue	Attendance
HOF	July 30	vs. Atlanta Falcons	L 17–21	0–1	Fawcett Stadium, Canton, Ohio	23,185
1	August 6	at Houston Oilers	L 3–31	0–2	Alamodome, San Antonio, Texas	29,815
2	August 13	vs. New York Giants	L 20–28	0–3	Olympia Stadion, Berlin, Germany	57,329
3	August 18	San Francisco 49ers	L 24–30	0–4	Jack Murphy Stadium	45,674
4	August 25	Los Angeles Rams	W 24–6	1–4	Jack Murphy Stadium	49,283

== Regular season ==
=== Overview ===
Having lost numerous starters on both offense and defense, San Diego were expected to struggle in 1994. In preseason predictions, they were frequently picked to finish 4th or 5th in the five-team AFC West division, with the Miami Herald naming them the worst of the NFL's 28 teams. Once the season started, the Chargers proved to be a surprise success with a 6–0 start that featured wins over all four of their division rivals. Their form slipped as they lost five of the next eight games, with the offense frequently struggling to produce touchdowns. They recovered to win their final two games, clinching their division and a first round bye.

San Diego's offense was built around establishing the running game to set up occasional deep play-action passes. The trade of Butts left Means as the starting running back; aided by a large and experienced offensive line, he responded with 12 touchdowns and 1,350 yards, six times gaining over 100 yards in a game. A powerful rusher with limited breakaway ability, Means had no runs over 25 yards all season but averaged a steady 3.9 yards per carry. His yardage total ranked second in the AFC and established a new franchise record. (Note: LaDainian Tomlinson broke this record in 2002.) Bieniemy was his primary backup and added 295 yards; San Diego's average of 115.8 yards per game ranked 7th in the league.

The passing game was led by Humphries, who picked up numerous injuries during the season but still started every game but one. His form matched that of the team in general, as he led the AFC in passer rating through the early winning streak, endured a midseason slump and finished with two strong performances. Overall, Humphries completed 58% of his passes, throwing for 3,209 yards with 17 touchdowns and 12 interceptions. His passer rating of 81.6 was 5th in the AFC and a new high for his career. With Miller and Lewis having left in the offseason, an inexperienced trio shared time at wide receiver—Seay, Jefferson and Martin each had the best statistical season of his career to that point. Seay led the trio with 58 receptions; Martin was the main big-play threat with 17.7 yards per receptions, and his totals of 885 yards and 7 touchdowns were the best of any Charger. The starting tight ends Pupunu and Duane Young were used primarily to block, but Harmon supplemented the wide receivers with 58 catches playing mainly as a third-down back.

Seau remained the Chargers' leading star and one of the league's top linebackers. He was credited with a team-leading 155 tackles (124 solo) despite struggling for much of the year with a pinched nerve in his left shoulder which frequently left him trying to play with only one good arm. His fellow linebackers, the newly signed Griggs and Gibson, both specialised in stopping the run, while Davis and Shawn Lee were a pair of 300-pounders in the middle of the defensive line; the Chargers' rush defense ranked top in the AFC. San Diego's defensive ends led the team in quarterback sacks, with Leslie O'Neal having 12 1/2 (2nd-most in the AFC) and Chris Mims adding 11. The pass defense had ranked last in the league in 1993. They appeared improved for much of the year but regressed late on and were still perceived as a weakness. Nonetheless, safety Stanley Richard played well enough to be named an alternate for the Pro Bowl—his four interceptions were tied with second-year cornerback Darrien Gordon for the team lead.

On special teams, the Chargers had two strong return specialists. Gordon's 13.2 yards per punt return were the best in the AFC, while Coleman's 26.4 yards per kickoff return ranked second; both players had two touchdown returns in the regular season. Kicker John Carney made 34 of 38 field goals and led the NFL in scoring with 135 points, a franchise record. (Note: LaDainian Tomlinson broke this record in 2006.)

=== Schedule ===
1994 regular season games
Week	Date	Opponent	Result	Record	Venue	Attendance	Recap
1	September 4	at **Denver Broncos**	**W** 37–34	1–0	Mile High Stadium	74,032	Recap
2	September 11	Cincinnati Bengals	**W** 27–10	2–0	Jack Murphy Stadium	53,217	Recap
3	September 18	at **Seattle Seahawks**	**W** 24–10	3–0	Husky Stadium	65,536	Recap
4	September 25	at **Los Angeles Raiders**	**W** 26–24	4–0	Los Angeles Memorial Coliseum	55,385	Recap
5	Bye						
6	October 9	**Kansas City Chiefs**	**W** 20–6	5–0	Jack Murphy Stadium	62,923	Recap
7	October 16	at New Orleans Saints	**W** 36–22	6–0	Louisiana Superdome	50,565	Recap
8	October 23	**Denver Broncos**	**L** 15–20	6–1	Jack Murphy Stadium	61,626	Recap
9	October 30	**Seattle Seahawks**	**W** 35–15	7–1	Jack Murphy Stadium	59,001	Recap
10	November 6	at Atlanta Falcons	**L** 9–10	7–2	Georgia Dome	59,217	Recap
11	November 13	at **Kansas City Chiefs**	**W** 14–13	8–2	Arrowhead Stadium	76,997	Recap
12	November 20	at New England Patriots	**L** 17–23	8–3	Foxboro Stadium	59,690	Recap
13	November 27	Los Angeles Rams	**W** 31–17	9–3	Jack Murphy Stadium	59,579	Recap
14	December 5	**Los Angeles Raiders**	**L** 17–24	9–4	Jack Murphy Stadium	63,012	Recap
15	December 11	San Francisco 49ers	**L** 15–38	9–5	Jack Murphy Stadium	62,105	Recap
16	December 18	at New York Jets	**W** 21–6	10–5	Giants Stadium	48,213	Recap
17	December 24	Pittsburgh Steelers	**W** 37–34	11–5	Jack Murphy Stadium	58,379	Recap
Note: Intra-division opponents are in **bold** text.

=== Game summaries ===
==== Week 1: at Denver Broncos ====
Week One: San Diego Chargers at Denver Broncos – Game summary

Quarter	1	2	3	4	Total
**Chargers**	6	21	3	7	**37**
Broncos	17	7	3	7	**34**

at Mile High Stadium, Denver, Colorado

- Date: September 4
- Game time: 6:00 p.m. MDT
- Game weather: 72 °F (22.2 °C), wind 11 miles per hour (18 km/h; 9.6 kn)
- Game attendance: 74,032
- Referee: Ed Hochuli
- TV announcers (TNT): Gary Bender and Pat Haden
- Box score

Game information

**First quarter**

- DEN – Mike Pritchard 50-yard pass from John Elway (Jason Elam kick), 12:21. Broncos 7–0. **Drive: 3 plays, 41 yards, 1:02.**
- DEN – Leonard Russell 22-yard run (Jason Elam kick), 7:45. Broncos 14–0. **Drive: 6 plays, 80 yards, 2:39.**
- DEN – Jason Elam 25-yard field goal, 4:26. Broncos 17–0. **Drive: 7 plays, 9 yards, 3:19.**
- SDG – Alfred Pupunu 22-yard pass from Stan Humphries (run failed), 0:25. Broncos 17–6. **Drive: 9 plays, 82 yards, 4:01.**

**Second quarter**

- DEN – Glyn Milburn 8-yard pass from John Elway (Jason Elam kick), 11:25. Broncos 24–6. **Drive: 9 plays, 83 yards, 4:00.**
- SDG – Shawn Jefferson 47-yard pass from Stan Humphries (John Carney kick), 9:13. Broncos 24–13. **Drive: 4 plays, 81 yards, 2:12.**
- SDG – Mark Seay 29-yard pass from Stan Humphries (pass failed), 7:28. Broncos 24–19. **Drive: 4 plays, 40 yards, 1:30.**
- SDG – Stanley Richard 99-yard interception return (Ronnie Harmon run), 0:00. Chargers 27–24.

**Third quarter**

- DEN – Jason Elam 25-yard field goal, 9:32. Tied 27–27. **Drive: 12 plays, 51 yards, 5:28.**
- SDG – John Carney 27-yard field goal, 6:01. Chargers 30–27. **Drive: 8 plays, 43 yards, 3:31.**

**Fourth quarter**

- DEN – Shannon Sharpe 5-yard pass from John Elway (Jason Elam kick), 14:07. Broncos 34–30. **Drive: 11 plays, 67 yards, 6:54.**
- SDG – Natrone Means 1-yard run (John Carney kick), 4:01. Chargers 37–34. **Drive: 19 plays, 89 yards, 10:06.**

**Top passers**

- SDG – Stan Humphries – 12/22, 232 yards, 3 TD
- DEN – John Elway – 36/46, 371 yards, 3 TD, 2 INT

**Top rushers**

- SDG – Natrone Means – 22 rushes, 96 yards, TD
- DEN – Leonard Russell – 8 rushes, 70 yards, TD

**Top receivers**

- SDG – Shawn Jefferson – 3 receptions, 79 yards, TD
- DEN – Mike Pritchard – 5 receptions, 119 yards, TD

Seau's late fumble recovery completed San Diego's comeback from eighteen points behind.

Denver scored on their first four possessions. Their first touchdown was set up by Kidd's shanked punt, which only went 13 yards; the Broncos had five plays covering 10 yards or more en route to their second touchdown. Martin fumbled the ensuing kickoff, and Denver reached a 1st and goal at the 2 before Seau and Shawn Lee shared a 3rd-down sack that forced a field goal. Humphries began the next drive with a 22-yard completion to Means and ended it with a 22-yard touchdown to Pupunu, but John Elway led another touchdown drive and Denver led 24–6. San Diego scored twice in the next four minutes. Humphries had a 25-yard completion to Eric Bieniemy before finding Jefferson behind the defense for a 47-yard touchdown, Carrington intercepted Elway's next pass, and Seay's touchdown catch followed on 3rd and 10. Late in the half, Denver embarked on an 11-play drive from their own 28 to a 3rd and 1 from the San Diego 5-yard line. Richard then made a diving interception, got to his feet and ran the ball back 99 yards for a touchdown as time expired. Harmon's two-point conversion run put the Chargers up 27–24 at halftime.

The teams had only three possessions each in the second half. After an exchange of field goals, Denver converted three 3rd downs, including Shannon Sharpe's touchdown on 3rd and goal from the 5. San Diego responded with a 19-play, 89-yard drive that featured five 3rd-down conversions and ran over ten minutes off the clock; Means' touchdown came on 3rd and goal from the 1. Trailing by three points with four minutes to play, Denver drove from their own 25 to the San Diego 3 without facing a 3rd down. On second and goal, Elway rolled to his right and attempted to pass to Miller, alone in the end zone. The ball slipped from his hand as he threw, popping up for Seau to recover with 35 seconds left, and San Diego ran out the clock.

Seay touchdown catch came on his first NFL reception. Harmon's two-point conversion was the first by a Charger since Lance Alworth in 1968. (Note: The NFL had newly adopted the two-point conversion for the 1994 season. Previously, it had been used in the AFL.)

==== Week 2: vs Cincinnati Bengals ====
Week Two: Cincinnati Bengals at San Diego Chargers – Game summary

Quarter	1	2	3	4	Total
Bengals	3	0	0	7	**10**
**Chargers**	3	10	7	7	**27**

at Jack Murphy Stadium, San Diego, California

- Date: September 11
- Game time: 1:00 p.m. PDT
- Game weather: 69 °F (20.6 °C), relative humidity 79%, wind 8 miles per hour (13 km/h; 7.0 kn)
- Game attendance: 53,217
- Referee: Howard Roe
- TV announcers (NBC): Dan Hicks and Bob Golic
- Box score

Game information

**First quarter**

- SDG – John Carney 38-yard field goal, 10:06. Chargers 3–0. **Drive: 7 plays, 67 yards, 2:36.**
- CIN – Doug Pelfrey 19-yard field goal, 5:16. Tied 3–3. **Drive: 10 plays, 73 yards, 4:50.**

**Second quarter**

- SDG – Natrone Means 3-yard run (John Carney kick), 14:44. Chargers 10–3. **Drive: 10 plays, 71 yards, 5:32.**
- SDG – John Carney 20-yard field goal, 5:12. Chargers 13–3. **Drive: 15 plays, 91 yards, 8:21.**

**Third quarter**

- SDG – Mark Seay 49-yard pass from Stan Humphries (John Carney kick), 0:26. Chargers 20–3. **Drive: 5 plays, 80 yards, 1:52.**

**Fourth quarter**

- CIN – Harold Green 5-yard pass from David Klingler (Doug Pelfrey kick), 11:59. Chargers 20–10. **Drive: 9 plays, 63 yards, 3:27.**
- SDG – Mark Seay 4-yard pass from Stan Humphries (John Carney kick), 3:16. Chargers 27–10. **Drive: 8 plays, 51 yards, 4:12.**

**Top passers**

- CIN – David Klingler – 21/34, 180 yards, TD, INT
- SDG – Stan Humphries – 18/29, 299 yards, 2 TD

**Top rushers**

- CIN – Darnay Scott – 3 rushes, 42 yards
- SDG – Natrone Means – 21 rushes, 107 yards, TD

**Top receivers**

- CIN – Carl Pickens – 4 receptions, 45 yards
- SDG – Mark Seay – 8 receptions, 119 yards, 2 TD

San Diego started 2–0 for the first time in 13 years after a straightforward win over the Bengals.

On the Chargers' third play from scrimmage, Humphries found Martin deep downfield for his first catch as a Charger, covering 61 yards and leading to a field goal. Cincinnati reached a 3rd and goal from the Chargers 8, but settled for a field goal after Seau tackled Steve Broussard at the 1-yard line. The Chargers were also set for a short field goal on the following drive, but the Bengals were penalised on the attempt, giving San Diego a fresh set of downs. Means scored on the next play. Humphries completed all four of his passes for 56 yards on their next possession, leading to another short field goal. Cincinnati gained a 2nd and 9 at the San Diego 10 late in the half, but Mims sacked David Klingler, forcing a fumble that Blaise Winter recovered. The halftime score was 13–3.

Cincinnati missed another good scoring chance in the 3rd quarter, this time reaching 3rd and goal from the 4 before Lee forced Broussard to fumble and recovered the ball himself. Later in the quarter, Seay was left completely unmarked on a 3rd and 8, leading to an easy 49-yard touchdown. The Bengals managed a touchdown in response, but had to punt on their next possession after Raylee Johnson tackled Tim McGee for a loss of 18 yards. San Diego then put the game away with a 51-yard drive on which Means (5 carries for 35 yards) and Seay (3 catches for 16 yards and the touchdown) accounted for every play.

The final score was identical to the result of the teams' previous game, in 1992.

==== Week 3: at Seattle Seahawks ====
Week Three: San Diego Chargers at Seattle Seahawks – Game summary

Quarter	1	2	3	4	Total
**Chargers**	0	10	14	0	**24**
Seahawks	0	3	0	7	**10**

at Husky Stadium, Seattle, Washington

- Date: September 18
- Game time: 1:00 p.m. PDT
- Game weather: 67 °F (19.4 °C), relative humidity 68%, wind 10 miles per hour (16 km/h; 8.7 kn)
- Game attendance: 65,536
- Referee: Jerry Markbreit
- TV announcers (NBC): Jim Lampley and Todd Christensen
- Box score

Game information

**First quarter**

- No scoring plays.

**Second quarter**

- SEA – John Kasay 39-yard field goal, 13:00. Seahawks 3–0. **Drive: 7 plays, -4 yards, 2:49.**
- SDG – John Carney 36-yard field goal, 7:11. Tied 3–3. **Drive: 13 plays, 55 yards, 5:49.**
- SDG – Natrone Means 1-yard run (John Carney kick), 0:19. Chargers 10–3. **Drive: 11 plays, 51 yards, 5:52.**

**Third quarter**

- SDG – Stanley Richard 73-yard interception return (John Carney kick), 6:28. Chargers 17–3.
- SDG – Tony Martin 99-yard pass from Stan Humphries (John Carney kick)), 1:55. Chargers 24–3. **Drive: 3 plays, 90 yards, 1:33.**

**Fourth quarter**

- SEA – Chris Warren 11-yard run (John Kasay kick), 9:49. Broncos 24–10. **Drive: 7 plays, 35 yards, 3:13.**

**Top passers**

- SDG – Stan Humphries – 19/29, 262 yards, TD
- SEA – Rick Mirer – 20/36, 163 yards, INT

**Top rushers**

- SDG – Natrone Means – 24 rushes, 86 yards, TD
- SEA – Chris Warren – 14 rushes, 55 yards, TD

**Top receivers**

- SDG – Tony Martin – 6 receptions, 152 yards, TD
- SEA – Brian Blades – 8 receptions, 66 yards

Humphries and Martin tied an NFL record when they combined for a 99-yard touchdown pass, and San Diego won a battle of unbeaten teams.

Seattle gained a first down on the San Diego 11 on the game's first possession but fumbled a handoff and Mims recovered. Late in the opening quarter, Martin attempted to pass on a trick play but was intercepted by Patrick Hunter, who returned the ball 51 yards before Curtis Whitley made the tackle. Consecutive pass interference penalties on Dwayne Harper gave Seattle a first down inside the 1-yard line, but Jon Vaughn was stopped for no gain then for a loss of 20 yards, and Seattle could only manage a field goal. Martin caught an 11-yard pass on 4th and 7 on the Chargers' response, which also ended with a field goal. After an O'Neal sack forced a Seattle three-and-out, San Diego went ahead to stay. Humphries found Harmon for 18 yards on 3rd and 15, and Means scored two plays later for a 10–3 lead at the break.

Carney missed a 48-yard field goal early in the 3rd quarter, and Seattle moved to a 1st and 10 at the San Diego 28. Seau pressured Rick Mirer on the next play, resulting in a hurried pass that Richard intercepted and returned for an easy 73-yard touchdown. Seattle later pinned San Diego at their own 10 with a punt. Following a run for no gain, Humphries was sacked at his own one-yard line by Brent Williams to bring up a 3rd and 19. Humphries then hit Tony Martin in stride at the 35-yard line, and he outran Hunter to complete the 99-yard touchdown. Seattle got one touchdown back after Humphries fumbled a snap, but could get no closer.

O'Neal had three of the Chargers' six sacks. Harper was penalized four times against his former teammates.

==== Week 4: at Los Angeles Raiders ====
Week Four: San Diego Chargers at Los Angeles Raiders – Game summary

Quarter	1	2	3	4	Total
**Chargers**	10	10	3	3	**26**
Raiders	0	3	14	7	**24**

at Los Angeles Memorial Coliseum, Los Angeles, California

- Date: September 25
- Game time: 1:00 p.m. PDT
- Game weather: 69 °F (20.6 °C), relative humidity 75%, wind 8 miles per hour (13 km/h; 7.0 kn)
- Game attendance: 55,385
- Referee: Bernie Kukar
- TV announcers (NBC): Dick Enberg and Bob Trumpy
- Box score

Game information

**First quarter**

- SDG – Darrien Gordon 90-yard punt return (John Carney kick), 12:08. Chargers 7–0.
- SDG – John Carney 38-yard field goal, 5:55. Chargers 10–0. **Drive: 10 plays, 46 yards, 5:40.**

**Second quarter**

- SDG – Natrone Means 1-yard run (John Carney kick), 13:37. Chargers 17–0. **Drive: 7 plays, 75 yards, 3:47.**
- RAI – Jeff Jaeger 43-yard field goal, 9:36. Chargers 17–3. **Drive: 7 plays, 27 yards, 4:01.**
- SDG – John Carney 24-yard field goal, 4:28. Chargers 20–3. **Drive: 8 plays, 37 yards, 5:08.**

**Third quarter**

- SDG – John Carney 27-yard field goal, 9:54. Chargers 23–3. **Drive: 10 plays, 50 yards, 5:06.**
- RAI – Jeff Hostetler 1-yard run (Jeff Jaeger kick), 6:58. Chargers 23–10. **Drive: 5 plays, 29 yards, 2:56.**
- RAI – Rocket Ismail 24-yard pass from Jeff Hostetler (Jeff Jaeger kick), 3:55. Chargers 23–17. **Drive: 5 plays, 52 yards, 1:57.**

**Fourth quarter**

- RAI – Lionel Washington 31-yard interception return (Jeff Jaeger kick), 7:01. Raiders 24–23.
- SDG – John Carney 33-yard field goal, 0:02. Chargers 26–24. **Drive: 14 plays, 65 yards, 6:59.**

**Top passers**

- SDG – Stan Humphries – 18/26, 191 yards, 2 INT
- RAI – Jeff Hostetler – 14/25, 230 yards, TD

**Top rushers**

- SDG – Natrone Means – 21 rushes, 52 yards, TD
- RAI – Harvey Williams – 11 rushes, 24 yards

**Top receivers**

- SDG – Ronnie Harmon – 6 receptions, 74 yards
- RAI – Tim Brown – 4 receptions, 88 yards

John Carney's 33-yard field goal with two seconds remaining preserved San Diego's unbeaten record after they had lost a 20-point lead.

Darrien Gordon eluded several would-be tacklers during his 90-yard punt return only three minutes into the game. On the first Chargers offensive series, Harmon's receptions converted a pair of third downs and Carney made his first field goal; on the next, Jefferson drew a 50-yard pass interference penalty on 3rd and 12 from the San Diego 49, and Means scored two plays later. Los Angeles then drove into Charger territory for the first time, taking a field goal after Seau sacked Jeff Hostetler on consecutive plays. Coleman returned the ensuing kickoff 52 yards, leading to another Carney field goal and a 20–3 lead. That was the halftime score after Los Angeles went for a 4th and 3 at the Chargers 6-yard line and Harvey Williams gained only 2 yards.

Carney's third field goal came on the opening possession of the second half and extended the Chargers' lead to 20 points. The Raiders began their comeback on the next drive when Hostetler scored on 4th and goal from the 1, then followed up with his touchdown pass three minutes later. Humphries threw his first interception of the season late in the 3rd quarter, and Los Angeles drove from their own 15 to the Chargers 16 before Williams fumbled and Carrington recovered. Four plays later, Humphries was hit as he threw and the resulting pass was intercepted by Lionel Washington. He returned the ball 31 yards and put Los Angeles ahead for the first time with seven minutes to play. Humphries injured his knee on the play, but returned to lead the Chargers' game-winning drive. They faced a 3rd and 14 at the Raiders 45 before Humphries found Harmon for 13 yards. Ross passed up on a field goal try as he wanted to run more time off the clock, and Humphries and Harmon connected again, this time for 8 yards and a first down. Carney's game-winner came three plays later.

Davis was ejected in the 2nd quarter for fighting. A loss by the New York Giants during San Diego's bye week left the Chargers as the league's last unbeaten team for the first time since they were an AFL team.

==== Week 6: vs. Kansas City Chiefs ====
Week Six: Kansas City Chiefs at San Diego Chargers – Game summary

Quarter	1	2	3	4	Total
Chiefs	0	3	0	3	**6**
**Chargers**	3	10	0	7	**20**

at Jack Murphy Stadium, San Diego, California

- Date: October 9
- Game time: 1:00 p.m. PDT
- Game weather: 78 °F (25.6 °C), relative humidity 42%, wind 9 miles per hour (14 km/h; 7.8 kn)
- Game attendance: 62,923
- Referee: Red Cashion
- TV announcers (NBC): Charlie Jones and Randy Cross
- Box score

Game information

**First quarter**

- SDG – John Carney 23-yard field goal, 5:24. Chargers 3–0. **Drive: 11 plays, 47 yards, 5:21.**

**Second quarter**

- KAN – Lin Elliott 25-yard field goal, 9:46. Tied 3–3. **Drive: 14 plays, 63 yards, 4:50.**
- SDG – John Carney 32-yard field goal, 6:46. Chargers 6–3. **Drive: 6 plays, 64 yards, 3:00.**
- SDG – Natrone Means 9-yard run (John Carney kick), 2:56. Chargers 13–3. **Drive: 5 plays, 43 yards, 2:18.**

**Third quarter**

- No scoring plays.

**Fourth quarter**

- KAN – Lin Elliott 25-yard field goal, 13:12. Chargers 13–6. **Drive: 10 plays, 62 yards, 4:17.**
- SDG – Mark Seay 5-yard pass from Stan Humphries (John Carney kick), 7:47. Chargers 20–6. **Drive: 9 plays, 77 yards, 5:25.**

**Top passers**

- KAN – Joe Montana – 37/55, 310 yards, INT
- SDG – Stan Humphries – 16/25, 171 yards, TD

**Top rushers**

- KAN – Greg Hill – 5 rushes, 45 yards
- SDG – Natrone Means – 19 rushes, 125 yards, TD

**Top receivers**

- KAN – Marcus Allen – 9 receptions, 83 yards
- SDG – Tony Martin – 1 reception, 48 yards

Means had a dominant performance as San Diego completed an early sweep of their AFC West rivals.

Midway through the opening quarter, Jefferson's 14-yard catch converted a 4th and 8 and led to Carney's first field goal. The Chargers were in Kansas City territory again on their following drive, but Bieniemy fumbled and Kansas City drove 63 yards to tie the score. Martin's 48-yard catch and run was the biggest play of the following drive, which led to another field goal. San Diego's defense forced a three-and-out, and they took over possession on the Kansas City 43. Means then carried five times in a row, covering 38 yards and drawing a further 5 via a facemask penalty; he finished the drive with a 9-yard touchdown run. Kansas City gained a first down on the San Diego 32 late in the half, but Mims sacked Joe Montana, Davis recovered, and the score remained 13–3 at the break.

Gordon stopped a 3rd quarter drive when he intercepted Montana's long pass near the goal line. Kansas City had a 4th and 1 at the San Diego 2-yard line early in the final period, but took a field goal after they were unable to induce the Chargers to jump offside. Means had gains of 25 and 23 yards on the following drive, which was capped by Seay's touchdown catch on 3rd and goal from the 5. Kansas City had two more drives reaching the San Diego 24- and 3-yard lines, but Montana threw incomplete on 4th down both times.

Means had 21 receiving yards as well as his 125 rushing yards. The Chargers debuted their powder blue throwback uniforms in the game. These were replicas of their 1961 season, which was also the last time they had started 5–0.

==== Week 7: at New Orleans Saints ====
Week Seven: San Diego Chargers at New Orleans Saints – Game summary

Quarter	1	2	3	4	Total
**Chargers**	14	13	6	3	**36**
Saints	0	7	7	8	**22**

at Louisiana Superdome, New Orleans, Louisiana

- Date: October 16
- Game time: 3:00 p.m. CDT
- Game weather: Dome
- Game attendance: 50,565
- Referee: Howard Roe
- TV announcers (NBC): Marv Albert and Paul Maguire
- Box score

Game information

**First quarter**

- SDG – Natrone Means 16-yard run (John Carney kick), 9:04. Chargers 7–0. **Drive: 8 plays, 55 yards, 3:32.**
- SDG – Natrone Means 8-yard run (John Carney kick), 0:23. Chargers 14–0. **Drive: 8 plays, 72 yards, 4:09.**

**Second quarter**

- SDG – John Carney 49-yard field goal, 11:55. Chargers 17–0. **Drive: 5 plays, 24 yards, 2:06.**
- SDG – Natrone Means 1-yard run (John Carney kick), 10:46. Chargers 24–0. **Drive: 2 plays, 28 yards, 1:09.**
- NO – Quinn Early 18-yard pass from Jim Everett (Morten Andersen kick), 8:10. Chargers 24–7. **Drive: 5 plays, 80 yards, 2:36.**
- SDG – John Carney 31-yard field goal, 1:00. Chargers 27–7. **Drive: 15 plays, 78 yards, 7:10.**

**Third quarter**

- SDG – John Carney 29-yard field goal, 13:46. Chargers 30–7. **Drive: 5 plays, 42 yards, 1:14.**
- NO – Irv Smith 1-yard pass from Jim Everett (Morten Andersen kick), 10:25. Chargers 30–14. **Drive: 7 plays, 75 yards, 3:21.**
- SDG – John Carney 29-yard field goal, 2:31. Chargers 33–14. **Drive: 15 plays, 60 yards, 7:54.**

**Fourth quarter**

- NO – Lorenzo Neal 1-yard run (Wesley Walls pass from Jim Everett), 9:39. Raiders 33–22. **Drive: 11 plays, 84 yards, 5:13.**
- SDG – John Carney 28-yard field goal, 3:39. Chargers 36–22. **Drive: 5 plays, 2 yards, 1:33.**

**Top passers**

- SDG – Stan Humphries – 17/29, 186 yards
- NO – Jim Everett – 24/35, 210 yards, 2 TD

**Top rushers**

- SDG – Natrone Means – 26 rushes, 120 yards, 3 TD
- NO – Derek Brown – 13 rushes, 81 yards

**Top receivers**

- SDG – Tony Martin – 5 receptions, 51 yards
- NO – Quinn Early – 6 receptions, 58 yards, TD

Three first-half touchdowns from Means and five field goals from Carney accounted for the Chargers' points as they improved to 6–0.

New Orleans missed a field goal on the game's opening possession. Means carried 4 times for 44 yards in response, capping the drive with his first touchdown. After the Saints missed another field goal, Humphries and Duane Young connected for 31 yards to set up another Means touchdown. Carney added a field goal and Steve Hendrickson recovered a fumble on the ensuing kickoff. Jefferson drew pass interference in the end zone two plays later and Means scored for the third time in four possessions. New Orleans quickly got on the scoreboard with their first touchdown, but San Diego responded with a seven-minute drive for a field goal and led 27–7 at halftime.

Jefferson drew another pass interference penalty early in the 3rd quarter, this one covering 41 yards and setting up a field goal. After another Saints touchdown, San Diego drove into New Orleans territory and Pupunu caught a 16-yard pass on 3rd and 7 from the 17. Means appeared to have scored two plays later, but Pupunu was called for offensive holding, pushing the Chargers back 10 yards and leading them to settle for another field goal. When New Orleans scored a touchdown and two-point conversion in the final quarter, they had cut the deficit to only 11 points and soon forced the Chargers to punt. On a 1st and 10 from the New Orleans 30 with under six minutes to play, Seau forced a fumble that Gordon recovered. Means had another touchdown negated by a holding penalty, but Carney added his fifth field goal and New Orleans failed to cross midfield on their final possession.

With Means having 120 yards rushing and 10 receiving, Bieniemy having 53 rushing, and Harmon having 27 rushing and 34 receiving, the Chargers' running backs combined for 244 of their 378 yards.

==== Week 8: vs. Denver Broncos ====
Week Eight: Denver Broncos at San Diego Chargers – Game summary

Quarter	1	2	3	4	Total
**Broncos**	0	7	7	6	**20**
Chargers	6	6	0	3	**15**

at Jack Murphy Stadium, San Diego, California

- Date: October 23
- Game time: 1:00 p.m. PDT
- Game weather: 65 °F (18.3 °C), relative humidity 80%, wind 5 miles per hour (8.0 km/h; 4.3 kn)
- Game attendance: 61,626
- Referee: Dick Hantak
- TV announcers (NBC): Charlie Jones & Randy Cross
- Box score

Game information

**First quarter**

- SDG – John Carney 22-yard field goal, 5:37. Chargers 3–0. **Drive: 8 plays, 55 yards, 3:48.**
- SDG – John Carney 39-yard field goal, 3:33. Chargers 6–0. **Drive: 4 plays, 0 yards, 0:22.**

**Second quarter**

- SDG – John Carney 37-yard field goal, 14:07. Chargers 9–0. **Drive: 8 plays, 25 yards, 3:02.**
- DEN – Leonard Russell 3-yard run (Jason Elam kick), 5:09. Chargers 9–7. **Drive: 16 plays, 80 yards, 8:58.**
- SDG – John Carney 26-yard field goal, 0:00. Chargers 12–7. **Drive: 7 plays, 44 yards, 0:43.**

**Third quarter**

- DEN – Shannon Sharpe 43-yard pass from John Elway (Jason Elam kick), 2:12. Broncos 14–12. **Drive: 3 plays, 48 yards, 1:20.**

**Fourth quarter**

- SDG – John Carney 44-yard field goal, 11:11. Chargers 15–14. **Drive: 8 plays, 55 yards, 2:59.**
- DEN – Jason Elam 54-yard field goal, 10:02. Broncos 17–15. **Drive: 4 plays, 4 yards, 1:09.**
- DEN – Jason Elam 25-yard field goal, 4:07. Broncos 20–15. **Drive: 9 plays, 66 yards, 4:07.**

**Top passers**

- DEN – John Elway – 22/31, 241 yards, TD, INT
- SDG – Stan Humphries – 17/33, 142 yards, 3 INT

**Top rushers**

- DEN – Leonard Russell – 18 rushes, 35 yards, TD
- SDG – Natrone Means – 19 rushes, 100 yards

**Top receivers**

- DEN – Shannon Sharpe – 6 receptions, 121 yards, TD
- SDG – Ronnie Harmon – 8 receptions, 69 yards

The Broncos, 1–5 heading into the game, handed the Chargers their first loss of the season.

Humphries threw his first interception three plays into the game on a 1st and 10 from the Denver 43. After the Broncos missed a field goal, San Diego moved back into Denver territory and Bieniemy's 36-yard run gave them a 1st and goal at the 4-yard line. Carney kicked his first field goal after Harmon dropped a touchdown on 3rd down. Three plays later, O'Neal knocked the ball from Elway's grip and Mims recovered at the Denver 21. Jefferson failed to stay in bounds while making a potential touchdown catch on first down, and the Chargers again took a field goal after two further incompletions. Denver again lost a fumble within three plays, this time forced by David Griggs and recovered by Seau at the Denver 44. San Diego drove as far as the 19 before settling for their third field goal in three drives. The Broncos responded with a 16-play touchdown drive on which Elway and Miller combined to convert two 3rd downs before Leonard Russell scored on 4th and 1 from the 3-yard line. Late in the half, Carrington intercepted a deflected Elway pass and returned it to the Denver 13. Means gained 5 yards on the next play but kicked out at an opposition player and was penalised 15 yards; Humphries was intercepted two plays later. The Broncos went three-and-out, and San Diego managed to reach the Denver 8-yard line, from where Carney made his fourth field goal as time expired. They led 12–7.

Denver took the second half kickoff and drove to the San Diego 6-yard line, from where they tried a fake field goal – Mims tackled the ball carrier for a loss of four yards. Later, Denver took the lead through Shannon Sharpe's 43-yard touchdown catch on 3rd and 5. Following an exchange of punts, Jefferson took a reverse 22 yards and Carney's 44-yard kick put the Chargers one point ahead. Denver responded with consecutive field goal drives leaving San Diego with 4:07 to score a touchdown. They reached the Denver 40, but Humphries was intercepted for the third time. After a Broncos punt, San Diego began their final drive on their own 19 with 1:53 to play. Humphries opened up with completions of 13 yards to Harmon and 23 to Martin, but injured his ankle making the second throw and was knocked out of the game. Gale Gilbert replaced him and opened with a 14-yard pass to Harmon, but then threw four incompletions from the Denver 31-yard line.

San Diego scored only 15 points despite having nine drives inside Denver territory. Carney was the first kicker to make five field goals in consecutive games.

==== Week 9: vs. Seattle Seahawks ====
Week Nine: Seattle Seahawks at San Diego Chargers – Game summary

Quarter	1	2	3	4	Total
Seahawks	0	7	0	8	**15**
**Chargers**	0	14	7	14	**35**

at Jack Murphy Stadium, San Diego, California

- Date: October 30
- Game time: 1:00 p.m. PST
- Game weather: 64 °F (17.8 °C), relative humidity 70%, wind 8 miles per hour (13 km/h; 7.0 kn)
- Game attendance: 59,001
- Referee: Ed Hochuli
- TV announcers (NBC): Tom Hammond and Cris Collinsworth
- Box score

Game information

**First quarter**

- No scoring plays.

**Second quarter**

- SEA – Chris Warren 9-yard run (John Kasay kick), 12:41. Seahawks 7–0. **Drive: 9 plays, 63 yards, 4:26.**
- SDG – John Carney 25-yard field goal, 7:14. Seahawks 7–3. **Drive: 9 plays, 38 yards, 3:05.**
- SDG – John Carney 39-yard field goal, 1:45. Seahawks 7–6. **Drive: 7 plays, 40 yards, 2:01.**
- SDG – Ronnie Harmon 15-yard run (Ronnie Harmon pass from Stan Humphries), 1:15. Chargers 14–7. **Drive: 2 plays, 23 yards, 0:06.**

**Third quarter**

- SDG – Natrone Means 5-yard run (John Carney kick), 10:12. Chargers 21–7. **Drive: 5 plays, 37 yards, 2:34.**

**Fourth quarter**

- SDG – Alfred Pupunu 8-yard pass from Gale Gilbert (John Carney kick), 11:43. Chargers 28–7. **Drive: 11 plays, 76 yards, 5:25.**
- SDG – Tony Martin 16-yard pass from Gale Gilbert (John Carney kick), 1:46. Chargers 35–7. **Drive: 13 plays, 89 yards, 7:09.**
- SEA – Jon Vaughn 93-yard kickoff return (Chris Warren run), 1:28. Chargers 35–15.

**Top passers**

- SEA – Rick Mirer – 15/30, 177 yards
- SDG – Gale Gilbert – 11/14, 125 yards, 2 TD, INT

**Top rushers**

- SEA – Chris Warren – 17 rushes, 92 yards, TD
- SDG – Natrone Means – 26 rushes, 104 yards, TD

**Top receivers**

- SEA – Brian Blades – 6 receptions, 89 yards
- SDG – Ronnie Harmon – 3 receptions, 60 yards

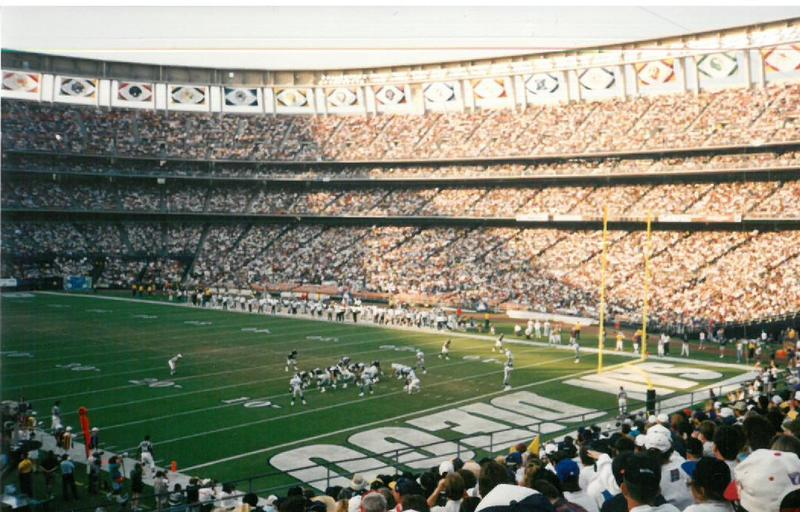
Week 9: San Diego's offense line up against the Seahawks.

Richard forced two key turnovers either side of halftime, and the Chargers overcome the loss of Stan Humphries to win comfortably.

After both teams opened with three punts, Seattle converted a 4th and 4 en route to their opening touchdown. After one more punt each, Harmon made a one-handed, 28-yard catch on 3rd and 13 that led to Carney's first field goal. The Seahawks drove into San Diego territory and went for it on 4th and 1 from the 39, but the Chargers defense stopped Rick Mirer for no gain on a quarterback sneak. Means had a 20-yard run on the next play, and the Chargers reached a 3rd and 8 from the Seattle 21 before Martin's apparent touchdown catch was dubiously ruled out of bounds and Carney made his second field goal. Richard forced Chris Warren to fumble on the next play with Gordon recovering at the Seattle 23. Harmon had an 8-yard catch, then ran the remaining 15 yards to the end zone on a draw play. Seattle drove to the San Diego 12-yard line with 6 seconds left, but committed a penalty while Mirer spiked the ball, resulting in a 10-second runoff and the half ending with San Diego up 14–7.

Humphries was sacked early in the 3rd quarter and dislocated an elbow. The Chargers punted but Richard again forced Warren to fumble with Carrington recovering at the Seattle 37. Gilbert replaced Humphries for the ensuing possession, and Means had 4 carries for 27 yards and the touchdown. Seattle's offense progressed no further than the San Diego 46 in the second half, and Gilbert led back-to-back drives of 76 and 89 yards, capping both with touchdown passes.

Humphries struggled before his injury, completing 7 of 17 passes for 86 yards. Means became the first Charger to post four consecutive 100-yard rushing performances.

==== Week 10: at Atlanta Falcons ====
Week Ten: San Diego Chargers at Atlanta Falcons – Game summary

Quarter	1	2	3	4	Total
Chargers	0	3	3	3	**9**
**Falcons**	7	0	3	0	**10**

at Georgia Dome, Atlanta, Georgia

- Date: November 6
- Game time: 1:00 p.m. EST
- Game weather: Dome
- Game attendance: 59,217
- Referee: Dale Hamer
- TV announcers (NBC): Marv Albert & Paul Maguire
- Box score

Game information

**First quarter**

- ATL – Terance Mathis 9-yard pass from Jeff George (Norm Johnson kick), 7:45. Falcons 7–0. **Drive: 13 plays, 91 yards, 7:15.**

**Second quarter**

- SDG – John Carney 50-yard field goal, 3:06. Falcons 7–3. **Drive: 6 plays, 35 yards, 2:27.**

**Third quarter**

- SDG – John Carney 33-yard field goal, 7:13. Falcons 7–6. **Drive: 14 plays, 63 yards, 7:47.**
- ATL – Norm Johnson 23-yard field goal, 5:11. Falcons 10–6. **Drive: 5 plays, 22 yards, 2:02.**

**Fourth quarter**

- SDG – John Carney 49-yard field goal, 13:52. Falcons 10–9. **Drive: 8 plays, 27 yards, 4:04.**

**Top passers**

- SDG – Gale Gilbert – 22/38, 207 yards
- ATL – Jeff George – 19/31, 180 yards, TD, 2 INT

**Top rushers**

- SDG – Natrone Means – 25 rushes, 102 yards
- ATL – Craig Heyward – 8 rushes, 37 yards

**Top receivers**

- SDG – Mark Seay – 6 receptions, 65 yards
- ATL – Terance Mathis – 7 receptions, 77 yards, TD

Carney's 4th quarter miss proved decisive as the Chargers lost with Humphries on the sidelines.

Atlanta converted three 3rd downs on their opening drive, scoring the game's lone touchdown when Terance Mathis broke Sean Vanhorse's tackle attempt en route to the end zone. The Chargers drove to Atlanta's 24-yard line in response, but holding penalties on Stan Brock and Joe Milinichik pushed them back out of field goal range. They crossed midfield again late in the 2nd quarter, this time scoring through Carney's 50-yard kick. Harper's interception of Jeff George gave San Diego possession at the Atlanta 33-yard line with 18 seconds to play, but Gilbert was sacked, forcing the Chargers to use their final timeout. His 26-yard completion to Harmon moved the ball to the Atlanta 15, but San Diego were unable to run another play before time expired with Atlanta up 7–3.

San Diego's best chance to score a touchdown came on the opening possession of the second half. Seay's 19-yard catch on a 3rd and 10 moved them to the Atlanta 6-yard line, then two runs by Means gained a yard. On 3rd and goal, Pupunu took a short pass in for a touchdown, but the score was ruled out when Young was flagged for offensive pass interference. Carney instead kicked his second field goal. A 58-yard kickoff return allowed Atlanta to quickly kick a field goal of their own. Later, Harper intercepted George again, setting up a short drive and Carney's third field goal. Trailing by one point, San Diego forced a punt, then Means gained 3 yards on a 4th and 1 as they drove back into Atlanta territory. On 3rd and 4 from the 29-yard line, Gilbert missed an open Seay near the goal line, and Carney pushed his potential go-ahead kick wide right from 47 yards out with eight minutes left. The Chargers last two drive ended in a punt and Gilbert's incompletion on 4th and 22 from his own 25.

Gilbert's previous start had been for the 1986 Seattle Seahawks. Carney had made 21 kicks in a row before his late miss. Means extended his streak of 100-yard rushing games to five; this stood as a franchise record until LaDainian Tomlinson had nine in a row in 2006.

==== Week 11: at Kansas City Chiefs ====
Week Eleven: San Diego Chargers at Kansas City Chiefs – Game summary

Quarter	1	2	3	4	Total
**Chargers**	0	0	7	7	**14**
Chiefs	0	13	0	0	**13**

at Arrowhead Stadium, Kansas City, Missouri

- Date: November 13
- Game time: 12:00 p.m. CST
- Game weather: 56 °F (13.3 °C), relative humidity 76%, wind 18 miles per hour (29 km/h; 16 kn)
- Game attendance: 76,997
- Referee: Ron Blum
- TV announcers (NBC): Dick Enberg & Bob Trumpy
- Box score

Game information

**First quarter**

- No scoring plays.

**Second quarter**

- KAN – Lin Elliott 27-yard field goal, 12:32. Chiefs 7–0. **Drive: 6 plays, 20 yards, 2:59.**
- KAN – Kimble Anders 1-yard run (Lin Elliott kick), 8:51. Chiefs 10–0. **Drive: 4 plays, 28 yards, 1:47.**
- KAN – Lin Elliott 34-yard field goal, 0:03. Chiefs 13–0. **Drive: 5 plays, 12 yards, 1:47.**

**Third quarter**

- SDG – Shawn Jefferson 52-yard pass from Stan Humphries (John Carney kick), 0:30. Chiefs 13–7. **Drive: 5 plays, 89 yards, 2:38.**

**Fourth quarter**

- SDG – Duane Young 5-yard pass from Stan Humphries (John Carney kick), 6:41. Chargers 14–13. **Drive: 3 plays, 8 yards, 1:19.**

**Top passers**

- SDG – Stan Humphries – 21/36, 206 yards, 2 TD, INT
- KAN – Joe Montana – 20/46, 178 yards, 2 INT

**Top rushers**

- SDG – Natrone Means – 21 rushes, 55 yards
- KAN – Kimble Anders – 13 rushes, 40 yards, TD

**Top receivers**

- SDG – Shawn Jefferson – 2 receptions, 60 yards, TD
- KAN – Danan Hughes – 4 receptions, 53 yards

The Chargers survived a controversial finish to complete a comeback win. Kansas City were a game back in the AFC West, and would have gone on top on divisional record with a victory.

Coleman fumbled the opening kickoff, though Richard soon intercepted Joe Montana to offset the error. A Means fumble late in the 1st quarter led to the Chiefs' first field goal, while Dale Carter's 30-yard punt return set up their touchdown. The Chargers ran only one play inside Chiefs territory in eight first half possessions, which resulted in a sack of Humphries and a fumble that Kansas City recovered. On the next San Diego possession, Humphries was intercepted at his own 29, leading to the Chiefs' second field goal. Kansas City started five different first half possessions in Charger territory, but led only 13–0.

San Diego punted on their first two drives of the 3rd quarter, and were poised to do so again on their third. Ron Dickerson was penalised for roughing Wagner on the kick, giving the Chargers 15 yards and a first down; Humphries found Jefferson behind the defense for a 52-yard touchdown on the next play. Midway through the final quarter, Carrington intercepted a deflected Montana pass and returned it 19 yards to the 8-yard line. After two Means carries gained 3 yards, Humphries found Young wide open in the end zone for the winning touchdown. The Chargers forced a punt, but were unable to run the clock out after Means lost a yard on 3rd and 1; Kansas City began their final possession at their own 23 with 1:51 to play. Montana converted two 4th downs as they reached a 3rd and 10 at their own 48 with 16 seconds left. Danan Hughes caught his next pass in bounds at the San Diego 30; the Chiefs scrambled to stop the clock, but Montana spiked the ball just after time had run out.

San Diego won despite being outgained by 249 yards to 235 and committing four of the game's six turnovers. The game's ending had some controversy, as Montana was jostled by O'Neal and Lee as they made their way over to their side of the line of scrimmage, making it harder for him to spike the ball quickly. Officials did throw a flag on the Chargers, but ruled that any infractions had occurred after the game clock had already run out.

==== Week 12: at New England Patriots ====
Week Twelve: San Diego Chargers at New England Patriots – Game summary

Quarter	1	2	3	4	Total
Chargers	0	0	10	7	**17**
**Patriots**	7	3	3	10	**23**

at Foxboro, Foxborough, Massachusetts

- Date: November 20
- Game time: 1:00 p.m. EST
- Game weather: 47 °F (8.3 °C), relative humidity 46%, wind 13 miles per hour (21 km/h; 11 kn)
- Game attendance: 59,690
- Referee: Gordon McCarter
- TV announcers (NBC): Don Criqui and Beasley Reece
- Box score

Game information

**First quarter**

- NE – Leroy Thompson 27-yard pass from Drew Bledsoe (Matt Bahr kick), 5:20. Patriots 7–0. **Drive: 8 plays, 67 yards, 4:27.**

**Second quarter**

- NE – Matt Bahr 39-yard field goal, 12:28. Patriots 10–0. **Drive: 9 plays, 32 yards, 3:32.**

**Third quarter**

- SDG – John Carney 34-yard field goal, 10:46. Patriots 10–3. **Drive: 9 plays, 43 yards, 4:14.**
- NE – Matt Bahr 38-yard field goal, 0:38. Patriots 13–3. **Drive: 9 plays, 33 yards, 4:07.**
- SDG – Andre Coleman 80-yard kickoff return (John Carney kick), 0:24. Patriots 13–10.

**Fourth quarter**

- NE – Marion Butts 1-yard run (Matt Bahr kick), 9:19. Patriots 20–10. **Drive: 12 plays, 64 yards, 6:05.**
- NE – Matt Bahr 23-yard field goal, 6:17. Patriots 23–10. **Drive: 4 plays, 8 yards, 2:14.**
- SDG – Tony Martin 2-yard pass from Stan Humphries (John Carney kick), 0:55. Patriots 23–17. **Drive: 14 plays, 92 yards, 2:37.**

**Top passers**

- SDG – Stan Humphries – 20/37, 219 yards, TD, 3 INT
- NE – Drew Bledsoe – 21/36, 224 yards, TD, 2 INT

**Top rushers**

- SDG – Natrone Means – 15 rushes, 59 yards
- NE – Marion Butts – 28 rushes, 88 yards, TD

**Top receivers**

- SDG – Duane Young – 4 receptions, 69 yards
- NE – Michael Timpson – 8 receptions, 82 yards

San Diego's offense again struggled in a loss, failing to produce a touchdown until the final minute.

A roughing the passer gave the Chargers the lone first down from their first three possessions, which ended with two punts and a Humphries interception. New England had more success, missing an early field goal but scoring twice to open up a 10-point lead. Young's 28-yard catch gave the Chargers their first scoring chance, but Carney missed a 48-yard field goal try. An interception by Gordon set them up at the New England 44 late in the first half; they reached the 28-yard line, but were pushed back by a penalty and a sack. Humphries eventually threw incomplete on 4th and 19 with 23 seconds left. The Patriots got in range for a 48-yard field goal try, but Matt Bahr missed and the lead stayed at 10–0.

Means carried 5 times for 30 yards on the opening drive of the second half, leading to Carney's 34-yard field goal. After Bahr restored the Patriots' 10-point lead, Coleman took a short kickoff and benefitted from strong blocking as he scored his first career touchdown without having to break any tackles. New England responded on the ensuing drive, which featured three 3rd-down conversion passes by Drew Bledsoe and ended with Butts scoring against his former team. Humphries was intercepted on the next two Charger drives, with New England converting the first of these turnovers into a field goal. The Chargers moved the ball on their final possession, with Humphries throwing for 95 of his game total of 218 yards. He converted a 4th and 20 with a 21-yard pass to Seay, and found Martin for the touchdown two plays later with 55 seconds left. New England recovered the ensuing onside kick attempt and ran out the clock.

Gordon had both the Chargers' interceptions. Means crossed 1,000 rushing yards for the season during the game. This game constituted the first time since 1983 that the Chargers played the Patriots. The reason for this is that before the admission of the Texans in 2002, NFL scheduling formulas for games outside a team's division were much more influenced by table position during the previous season.

==== Week 13: vs. Los Angeles Rams ====
Week Thirteen: Los Angeles Rams at San Diego Chargers – Game summary

Quarter	1	2	3	4	Total
Rams	0	14	0	3	**17**
**Chargers**	0	6	15	10	**31**

at Jack Murphy Stadium, San Diego, California

- Date: November 27
- Game time: 1:00 p.m. PST
- Game weather: 52 °F (11.1 °C), relative humidity 58%, wind 8 miles per hour (13 km/h; 7.0 kn)
- Game attendance: 59,579
- Referee: Bob McElwee
- TV announcers (FOX): Dick Stockton and Matt Millen
- Box score

Game information

**First quarter**

- No scoring plays.

**Second quarter**

- RAM – Jessie Hester 40-yard pass from Chris Miller (Tony Zendejas kick), 14:09. Rams 7–0. **Drive: 1 play, 40 yards, 0:06.**
- SDG – John Carney 31-yard field goal, 6:58. Rams 7–3. **Drive: 13 plays, 50 yards, 7:11.**
- RAM – Troy Drayton 12-yard pass from Chris Miller (Tony Zendejas kick), 2:51. Rams 14–3. **Drive: 8 plays, 61 yards, 4:07.**
- SDG – John Carney 48-yard field goal, 0:59. Rams 14–6. **Drive: 8 plays, 32 yards, 1:52.**

**Third quarter**

- SDG – Darrien Gordon 75-yard punt return (Ronnie Harmon run), 13:12. Tied 14–14.
- SDG – Ronnie Harmon 11-yard pass from Stan Humphries (John Carney kick), 6:20. Chargers 21–14. **Drive: 10 plays, 52 yards, 4:31.**

**Fourth quarter**

- SDG – John Carney 36-yard field goal, 9:58. Chargers 24–14. **Drive: 9 plays, 52 yards, 5:24.**
- RAM – Tony Zendejas 33-yard field goal, 3:48. Chargers 24–17. **Drive: 10 plays, 46 yards, 3:22.**
- SDG – Sean Vanhorse 50-yard interception return (John Carney kick), 0:51. Chargers 31–17.

**Top passers**

- RAM – Chris Miller – 26/47, 298 yards, 2 TD, 4 INT
- SDG – Stan Humphries – 17/33, 147 yards, TD, INT

**Top rushers**

- RAM – Jerome Bettis – 10 rushes, 38 yards
- SDG – Natrone Means – 23 rushes, 95 yards

**Top receivers**

- RAM – Jessie Hester – 4 receptions, 85 yards, TD
- SDG – Mark Seay – 4 receptions, 42 yards

Gordon made big plays on both defense and special teams as the Chargers avoided an upset loss to the Rams.

San Diego missed some early scoring chances. Harper intercepted Chris Miller to set his offense up at midfield, but they failed to gain a first down and punted. Later, Martin dropped a long touchdown and the Chargers punted, but Lewis Bush recovered a muffed return at the Los Angeles 24-yard line. San Diego advanced to the 14 before a Means touchdown was negated by a holding penalty on Courtney Hall and two sacks led them to punt on 4th and 38. The Rams, who entered the game with a 4–7 record, took the lead one play after a Humphries interception. Martin dropped another long touchdown pass on the following drive; Harmon later ran for 9 yards on 4th and 2, but San Diego eventually settled for Carney's first field goal. The next two drives resulted in another Rams touchdown and another Chargers field goal, leaving Los Angeles 14–6 up at halftime.

The Rams opened the second half by going three-and-out, and Gordon returned the punt 75 yards up the left sideline for a touchdown before Harmon's two-point run tied the score. Los Angeles went three-and-out again, and San Diego's offense produced their lone touchdown drive of the game: Martin's 7-yard catch converted a 3rd and 6, and Harmon's touchdown came on 3rd and 9 from the 10-yard line. The Rams threatened to tie the score as they reached 3rd and 1 at the San Diego 7, but Gordon deflected Miller's end zone pass up in the air before intercepting it himself. Seay's 27-yard catch then moved the ball into Rams territory, and Carney put the Chargers up by 10. Los Angeles managed a field goal of their own late in the game, then forced a punt and took over on their own 27 with 2:38 to play. They reached a 4th and 5 from their own 44, then Vanhorse intercepted Miller at midfield and ran it back for the clinching touchdown.

Four different Charger defensive backs had interceptions. San Diego were outgained by 326 yards to 243, but produced five of the game's six takeaways.

==== Week 14: vs. Los Angeles Raiders ====
Week Fourteen: Los Angeles Raiders at San Diego Chargers – Game summary

Quarter	1	2	3	4	Total
**Raiders**	7	7	0	10	**24**
Chargers	7	7	0	3	**17**

at Jack Murphy Stadium, San Diego, California

- Date: December 5
- Game time: 6:00 p.m. PST
- Game weather: 58 °F (14.4 °C), relative humidity 74%, wind 7 miles per hour (11 km/h; 6.1 kn)
- Game attendance: 63,012
- Referee: Gerry Austin
- TV announcers (ABC): Al Michaels, Frank Gifford and Dan Dierdorf
- Box score

Game information

**First quarter**

- RAI – Alexander Wright 76-yard pass from Jeff Hostetler (Jeff Jaeger kick), 13:50. Raiders 7–0. **Drive: 1 play, 76 yards, 0:10.**
- SDG – Shawn Jefferson 29-yard pass from Stan Humphries (John Carney kick), 11:03. Tied 7–7. **Drive: 4 plays, 63 yards, 2:47.**

**Second quarter**

- RAI – Rocket Ismail 6-yard pass from Vince Evans (Jeff Jaeger kick), 10:27. Raiders 14–7. **Drive: 14 plays, 82 yards, 8:10.**
- SDG – Tony Martin 16-yard pass from Gale Gilbert (John Carney kick), 0:07. Tied 14–14. **Drive: 9 plays, 55 yards, 1:33.**

**Third quarter**

- RAI – Jeff Jaeger 43-yard field goal, 14:55. Raiders 17–14. **Drive: 10 plays, 55 yards, 4:43.**
- SDG – John Carney 24-yard field goal, 12:34. Tied 17–17. **Drive: 5 plays, 18 yards, 2:21.**

**Fourth quarter**

- RAI – Rocket Ismail 6-yard pass from Jeff Hostetler (Jeff Jaeger kick), 7:23. Raiders 24–17. **Drive: 9 plays, 81 yards, 5:11.**

**Top passers**

- RAI – Jeff Hostetler – 22/29, 319 yards, 2 TD, INT
- SDG – Stan Humphries – 17/33, 202 yards, TD

**Top rushers**

- RAI – Harvey Williams – 20 rushes, 41 yards
- SDG – Natrone Means – 18 rushes, 41 yards

**Top receivers**

- RAI – Tim Brown – 7 receptions, 96 yards
- SDG – Mark Seay – 4 receptions, 61 yards

Given an opportunity to clinch the AFC West, San Diego instead lost a close game to Los Angeles.

A loss by Kansas City the previous day had left the Chargers one win from clinching the division, but Jeff Hostetler capitalized on an error by Richard to throw a touchdown pass on the Raiders' first play. San Diego were aided by four Raider penalties for 25 yards on their answering drive, ending in Jefferson's touchdown. Vince Evans briefly relieved Hostetler in the 2nd quarter, with the second of his two passes going for a touchdown. Hostetler was back for the next Los Angeles possession, throwing a 54-yard completion to James Jett (Richard made a touchdown-saving tackle) but getting intercepted by Griggs two plays later. After an exchange of punts, San Diego began a drive at their own 45. Humphries was sacked on the first play, but came back to convert a 3rd and 18 with a 24-yard completion to Seay. Later in the drive, Humphries was temporarily knocked out of the game by a thumb sprain, and Gilbert completed all three of his passes, the last for a touchdown to Martin and a 14–14 halftime tie.

Humphries returned for the first Chargers possession of the second half and converted two 3rd downs as they reach a 1st and 10 at the Los Angeles 19. Means then attempted a pass, but missed an easy touchdown when he overthrew an open receiver; two plays later, he lost a fumble. Los Angeles drove for a field goal before Coleman returned the kickoff for 68 yards and San Diego responded in kind. The Raiders then drove 81 yards for their fourth lead of the game. San Diego crossed midfield on each of their last three possessions: from the Los Angeles 45-yard line Harry Swayne was penalized for holding leading to a punt, from the Los Angeles 49 Humphries threw incomplete on 4th and 3, and from the Los Angeles 48 Stan Brock was penalized for holding and Humphries was eventually sacked at his own 33 as time expired.

Four different quarterbacks threw touchdowns to four different receivers in the first half. Los Angeles were penalized 17 times for the loss of 146 yards while San Diego gave up 9 penalties for 63 yards.

==== Week 15: vs. San Francisco 49ers ====
Week Fifteen: San Francisco 49ers at San Diego Chargers – Game summary

Quarter	1	2	3	4	Total
**49ers**	7	14	3	14	**38**
Chargers	0	3	6	6	**15**

at Jack Murphy Stadium, San Diego, California

- Date: December 11
- Game time: 1:00 p.m. PST
- Game weather: 54 °F (12.2 °C), relative humidity 62%, wind 7 miles per hour (11 km/h; 6.1 kn)
- Game attendance: 62,105
- Referee: Tom White
- TV announcers (FOX): Pat Summerall and John Madden
- Box score

Game information

**First quarter**

- SF – Brent Jones 10-yard pass from Steve Young (Doug Brien kick), 1:31. 49ers 7–0. **Drive: 11 plays, 60 yards, 6:09.**

**Second quarter**

- SF – John Taylor 4-yard pass from Steve Young (Doug Brien kick), 5:39. 49ers 14–0. **Drive: 7 plays, 37 yards, 3:48.**
- SF – Ricky Watters 4-yard run (Doug Brien kick), 1:51. 49ers 21–0. **Drive: 4 plays, 59 yards, 1:39.**
- SDG – John Carney 50-yard field goal, 00:00. 49ers 21–3. **Drive: 7 plays, 45 yards, 0:53.**

**Third quarter**

- SDG – Natrone Means 12-yard run (run failed), 9:15. 49ers 21–9. **Drive: 11 plays, 47 yards, 5:45.**
- SF – Doug Brien 22-yard field goal, 4:16. 49ers 24–9. **Drive: 9 plays, 71 yards, 4:59.**

**Fourth quarter**

- SF – William Floyd 1-yard run (Doug Brien kick), 8:20. 49ers 31–9. **Drive: 10 plays, 68 yards, 5:19.**
- SDG – Tony Martin 2-yard pass from Stan Humphries (run failed), 5:28. 49ers 31–15. **Drive: 10 plays, 73 yards, 2:52.**
- SF – Deion Sanders 90-yard interception return (Doug Brien kick), 0:32. 49ers 38–15.

**Top passers**

- SF – Steve Young – 25/32, 304 yards, 2 TD
- SDG – Stan Humphries – 25/43, 337 yards, TD, 2 INT

**Top rushers**

- SF – Rickey Watters – 17 rushes, 53 yards, TD
- SDG – Natrone Means – 18 rushes, 50 yards, TD

**Top receivers**

- SF – Jerry Rice – 12 receptions, 144 yards
- SDG – Tony Martin – 9 receptions, 172 yards, TD

In the Super Bowl XXIX preview, the Chargers missed their second chance to win their division as they lost for the fifth time in eight games.

San Diego began well, forcing a punt and converting two 3rd downs as they crossed into San Francisco territory, but Humphries was sacked attempting to convert a 4th and 8 from the 31. Steve Young then led his team deep into Charger territory on four consecutive possessions, failing on 4th down once but scoring three touchdowns without reply. Humphries threw an interception in his own territory on the next play, but O'Neal knocked the ball from Young's hand and recovered it himself. Four completions from Humphries covered 56 yards, and Carney's 50-yard kick as time expired closed the deficit to 21–3.

Coleman ran the second half kickoff back 41 yards. Pupunu's 6-yard catch on 4th and 2 kept the ensuing drive going and Means scored to reduce the deficit further. The 49ers responded with a field goal. San Diego then drove as far as San Francisco's 13-yard line but were pushed back by a penalty and sack before Carney missed a 42-yard kick; the 49ers drove 68 yards the other way for a further touchdown. Martin had 4 catches for 65 yards on the Chargers' final scoring drive, finishing with a touchdown on 4th and goal from the 2-yard line. After San Francisco ran most of the remaining time off the clock, Martin's 54-yard catch gave San Diego another scoring chance, but Deion Sanders intercepted Humphries' next pass and returned it for a touchdown.

Means' touchdown was his first since week 9. Martin's 172 receiving yards would stand as the most of his career.

==== Week 16: at New York Jets ====
Week Sixteen: San Diego Chargers at New York Jets – Game summary

Quarter	1	2	3	4	Total
**Chargers**	0	7	7	7	**21**
Jets	3	3	0	0	**6**

at Giants Stadium, East Rutherford, New Jersey

- Date: December 18
- Game time: 1:00 p.m. EST
- Game weather: 44 °F (6.7 °C), relative humidity 80%, wind 11 miles per hour (18 km/h; 9.6 kn)
- Game attendance: 48,213
- Referee: Jerry Markbreit
- TV announcers (NBC): Tom Hammond & Cris Collinsworth
- Box score

Game information

**First quarter**

- NYJ – Nick Lowery 38-yard field goal, 0:37. Jets 3–0. **Drive: 8 plays, 35 yards, 4:27.**

**Second quarter**

- NYJ – Nick Lowery 30-yard field goal, 3:55. Jets 6–0. **Drive: 8 plays, 48 yards, 4:13.**
- SDG – Mark Seay 2-yard pass from Stan Humphries (John Carney kick), 1:09. Chargers 7–6. **Drive: 8 plays, 64 yards, 2:46.**

**Third quarter**

- SDG – Tony Martin 44-yard pass from Stan Humphries (John Carney kick), 7:28. Chargers 14–6. **Drive: 6 plays, 65 yards, 3:13.**

**Fourth quarter**

- SDG – Tony Martin 60-yard pass from Stan Humphries (John Carney kick), 5:05. Chargers 21–6. **Drive: 1 play, 60 yards, 0:07.**

**Top passers**

- SDG – Stan Humphries – 19/26, 280 yards, 3 TD
- NYJ – Jack Trudeau – 11/20, 99 yards

**Top rushers**

- SDG – Natrone Means – 23 rushes, 73 yards
- NYJ – Richie Anderson – 6 rushes, 23 yards

**Top receivers**

- SDG – Tony Martin – 3 receptions, 116 yards, 2 TD
- NYJ – Richie Anderson – 7 receptions, 64 yards

San Diego overcame a slow start to clinch the AFC West at the third attempt.

New York gained a first down at the San Diego 26 early in the game, but Lee forced a fumble that Seau recovered. San Diego drove to a 4th and 1 at the Jets 34-yard line, but Means was stopped for a loss of 2 and they turned the ball over on downs. Means lost a fumble near midfield on the Chargers' next possession, and New York drove for their first field goal. The Jets added another field goal in the 2nd quarter, after which the Chargers responded with their first touchdown: Young had a 13-yard catch on 3rd and 3, and Seay's touchdown came on 3rd and 2 putting San Diego 7–6 ahead.

The Chargers extended their lead on their first second-half possession. Seay gained just enough yardage on a 3rd and 3 reception, and Humphries found Martin open up the right sideline for a 44-yard touchdown on the next play. Seay drew a 27-yard pass interference penalty to move San Diego back into Jets territory later in the 3rd quarter, but Means lost another fumble, this time on 1st and 10 from the 12-yard line. After two punts each, the Jets reached a 4th and 6 at the San Diego 40, from where Jack Trudeau threw incomplete with five minutes left. The Chargers immediately scored the clinching touchdown, Martin getting behind the Jet defense for a 60-yard touchdown. New York punted after Reggie White's 3rd-down sack, then Rodney Culver ran 6 times for 59 yards as San Diego ran the final three minutes off the clock.

San Diego had five sacks, with Lee and White credited with two each. Humphries had a passer rating of 146.3, which would stand as the best of his career.

==== Week 17: vs. Pittsburgh Steelers ====
Week Seventeen: Pittsburgh Steelers at San Diego Chargers – Game summary

Quarter	1	2	3	4	Total
Steelers	0	13	6	15	**34**
**Chargers**	3	14	7	13	**37**

at Jack Murphy Stadium, San Diego, California

- Date: December 24
- Game time: 1:00 p.m. PST
- Game weather: 60 °F (15.6 °C), relative humidity 84%, wind 8 miles per hour (13 km/h; 7.0 kn)
- Game attendance: 58,379
- Referee: Dick Hantak
- TV announcers (NBC): Jim Lampley & Todd Christensen
- Box score

Game information

**First quarter**

- SDG – John Carney 37-yard field goal, 6:19. Chargers 3–0. **Drive: 14 plays, 49 yards, 5:39.**

**Second quarter**

- PIT – Gary Anderson 28-yard field goal, 9:09. Tied 3–3. **Drive: 9 plays, 63 yards, 3:48.**
- SDG – Andre Coleman 90-yard kickoff return (John Carney kick), 8:53. Chargers 10–3.
- PIT – Gary Anderson 28-yard field goal, 3:07. Chargers 10–6. **Drive: 10 plays, 61 yards, 5:46.**
- PIT – Charles Johnson 19-yard pass from Neil O'Donnell (Gary Anderson kick), 1:00. Steelers 13–10. **Drive: 5 plays, 56 yards, 1:00.**
- SDG – Mark Seay 2-yard pass from Stan Humphries (John Carney kick), 0:26. Chargers 17–13. **Drive: 5 plays, 73 yards, 0:34.**

**Third quarter**

- SDG – Natrone Means 2-yard run (John Carney kick), 7:12. Chargers 24–13. **Drive: 17 plays, 78 yards, 7:48.**
- PIT – Fred McAfee 6-yard run (pass failed), 3:05. Chargers 24–19. **Drive: 7 plays, 83 yards, 4:07.**

**Fourth quarter**

- PIT – Charles Johnson 84-yard pass from Mike Tomczak (Dwight Stone pass from Mike Tomczak), 14:48. Steelers 27–24. **Drive: 2 plays, 83 yards, 0:24.**
- SDG – John Carney 40-yard field goal, 10:29. Tied 27–27. **Drive: 8 plays, 50 yards, 4:19.**
- PIT – Andre Hastings 11-yard pass from Mike Tomczak (Gary Anderson kick), 6:29. Steelers 34–27. **Drive: 9 plays, 84 yards, 4:00.**
- SDG – Natrone Means 20-yard run (John Carney kick), 4:32. Tied 34–34. **Drive: 6 plays, 44 yards, 1:57.**
- SDG – John Carney 32-yard field goal, 0:03. Chargers 37–34. **Drive: 7 plays, 34 yards, 2:36.**

**Top passers**

- PIT – Mike Tomczak – 10/16, 248 yards, 2 TD
- SDG – Stan Humphries – 21/35, 249 yards, TD

**Top rushers**

- PIT – Bam Morris – 9 rushes, 56 yards
- SDG – Natrone Means – 22 rushes, 85 yards, 2 TD

**Top receivers**

- PIT – Charles Johnson – 4 receptions, 165 yards, 2 TD
- SDG – Ronnie Harmon – 6 receptions, 85 yards

San Diego earned a first-round playoff bye on John Carney's 32-yard field goal with 3 seconds left in the game.

The Chargers' first drive was prolonged when Pittsburgh had too many men on the field during a punt, leading to Carney's first field goal. Pittsburgh tied the score in the 2nd quarter, but Coleman broke to the left sideline with the ensuing kickoff and outran the Steelers coverage for a 90-yard touchdown. Pittsburgh scored 10 points on their next two drive to move ahead with exactly a minute to play. Humphries then led a rapid drive featuring four completions to four different receivers, covering 22, 23, and 30 yards before the 2-yard touchdown to Seay. They led 17–13 at the interval.

San Diego opened the second half with a 17-play, 78-yard touchdown drive. Martin converted a pair of 3rd downs, and Seay had a 7-yard catch on 4th and 4; Means eventually scored on 3rd and goal from the 2-yard line. Pittsburgh, who were assured of the No. 1 seed in the playoffs, had rested many of their starters by this point but nonetheless rallied as Mike Tomczak led a pair of touchdown drives to take the lead. Harmon had a 35-yard catch on 3rd and 19 to position San Diego for a game-tying field goal, but Pittsburgh produced a third consecutive touchdown drive to go up 34–27. Coleman broke off a 46-yard return on the ensuing kickoff, and the Chargers, now led by Gale Gilbert after another Humphries injury, soon reached 4th and 1 on the Steelers' 20. Means then broke through off right tackle, surviving contact with numerous defenders en route to the end zone. After the defense forced a three-and-out, Means carried four times on a 34-yard drive to set up the winning kick.

The final scoreline was the same as in the Chargers' opening game of the season. San Diego were outgained by 442 yards to 350 but were boosted by Coleman 6 kickoff returns for 195 yards.

=== Standings ===
AFC West
	W	L	T	PCT	PF	PA	STK
^{(2)} San Diego Chargers	11	5	0	.688	381	306	W2
^{(6)} Kansas City Chiefs	9	7	0	.563	319	298	W2
Los Angeles Raiders	9	7	0	.563	303	327	L1
Denver Broncos	7	9	0	.438	347	396	L3
Seattle Seahawks	6	10	0	.375	287	323	L2

== Postseason ==
Round	Date	Opponent (seed)	Result	Record	Venue	Attendance	Recap
Divisional	January 8, 1995	Miami Dolphins (3)	W 22–21	1–0	Jack Murphy Stadium	63,381	Recap
AFC Championship	January 15, 1995	at Pittsburgh Steelers (1)	W 17–13	2–0	Three Rivers Stadium	61,545	Recap
Super Bowl XXIX	January 29, 1995	San Francisco 49ers (N1)	L 26–49	2–1	Joe Robbie Stadium	74,107	Recap

=== Game summaries ===
==== AFC Divisional Playoffs: vs. Miami Dolphins ====
AFC Divisional Playoffs: (#3) Miami Dolphins at (#2) San Diego Chargers – Game summary

Quarter	1	2	3	4	Total
Dolphins	7	14	0	0	21
Chargers	0	6	9	7	22

at Jack Murphy Stadium, San Diego, California

- Date: January 8
- Game time: 1:00 p.m. PST
- Game weather: 60 °F (16 °C), relative humidity 86%, wind 12 miles per hour (19 km/h; 10 kn)
- Game attendance: 63,381
- Referee: Johnny Grier
- TV announcers (NBC): Dick Enberg (play-by-play) and Bob Trumpy (color commentator)
- Box score

Game information

First quarter

- MIA – Keith Jackson 8-yard pass from Dan Marino (Pete Stoyanovich kick), 2:24. Dolphins 7–0. Drive: 9 plays, 79 yards, 3:55.

Second quarter

- SDG – John Carney 20-yard field goal, 10:36. Dolphins 7–3. Drive: 15 plays, 72 yards, 6:48.
- MIA – Keith Jackson 9-yard pass from Dan Marino (Pete Stoyanovich kick), 7:21. Dolphins 14–3. Drive: 6 plays, 52 yards, 3:15.
- SDG – John Carney 21-yard field goal, 2:47. Dolphins 14–6. Drive: 9 plays, 70 yards, 4:34.
- MIA – Mike Williams 16-yard pass from Dan Marino (Pete Stoyanovich kick), 0:27. Dolphins 21–6. Drive: 9 plays, 70 yards, 2:20.

Third quarter

- SDG – Safety, Reuben Davis tackled Bernie Parmalee in the end zone, 6:54. Dolphins 21–8.
- SDG – Natrone Means 24-yard run (John Carney kick), 2:42. Dolphins 21–15. Drive: 8 plays, 54 yards, 4:12.

Fourth quarter

- SDG – Mark Seay 8-yard pass from Stan Humphries (John Carney kick), 0:35. Chargers 22–21. Drive: 10 plays, 61 yards, 2:41.

Top passers

- MIA – Dan Marino – 24/38, 262 yards, 3 TD
- SDG – Stan Humphries – 28/43, 276 yards, TD, 2 INT

Top rushers

- MIA – Bernie Parmalee – 7 rushes, 16 yards
- SDG – Natrone Means – 24 rushes, 139 yards, TD

Top receivers

- MIA – Keith Jackson – 8 receptions, 109 yards, 2 TD
- SDG – Tony Martin – 5 receptions, 62 yards

The Chargers overcame a 15-point halftime deficit and hung on to win when Pete Stoyanovich missed a 48-yard field goal with 1 second left.

San Diego moved into Miami territory on Means' 19-yard run midway through the opening quarter, but he lost a fumble after catching a 6-yard pass on 2nd and 7 at the Dolphins 32. Dan Marino's passes then accounted for 65 yards on a 79-yard touchdown drive. The Chargers reached a 4th and 7 at the Miami 38 in reply, which Harmon converted with a one-handed catch for 15 yards. Pupunu's 13-yard catch moved the ball to the 6-yard line, but Humphries eventually threw incomplete on 3rd and goal from the 2, leading to a short field goal. Marino needed only six plays to guide Miami to another touchdown. Means broke off consecutive carries of 18 and 20 yards before Bieniemy ran for 17 yards to bring up another 1st and goal from the 6. Two plays produced no gain, then Jefferson could only pick up 3 yards on an end-around. Carney kicked another chip shot field goal, but Miami responded with a third consecutive touchdown drive. Humphries was intercepted in the final seconds, and Miami led 21–6 at the break.

After taking the second half kickoff, the Chargers embarked on a 15-play drive that covered 81 yards in nearly eight minutes. Seay had a 14-yard catch on 3rd and 5 and a 15-yarder on 4th and 7 from the Miami 25-yard line. Three plays later, Harmon's 8-yard catch brought up a 4th and goal from the 1. This time, Ross passed on the short field goal and went for the touchdown; Means swept left, but was forced out of bounds short of the goal line. On the following play, Davis tackled Bernie Parmalee in the end zone for a safety. After taking the ensuing free kick, San Diego converted 3rd downs through Jefferson and Means, bringing up a 1st and 10 at the Miami 24-yard line. Means ran round the right end of the line and fought through several tacklers inside the 10-yard line. He dove for the corner of the end zone and was awarded a touchdown after officials failed to notice his foot going out of bounds inside the 3-yard line. San Diego had to punt on their next possession after Means was stopped for no gain on a 3rd and 1 from midfield. Soon afterwards, Keith Jackson caught a 20-yard pass from Marino and attempted to lateral the ball to a teammate. The pass went to ground and the Chargers recovered. However, as the ball had gone forwards it was classed as an illegal forward pass and not a fumble, so Miami retained possession. San Diego forced a punt, and gained a first down at the Miami 37-yard line. From there, a Humphries touchdown pass to Jefferson was incorrectly ruled to have been caught out of bounds. Humphries was intercepted on the next play.

After a Miami three-and-out, San Diego took over at their own 39 with 3:16 remaining in the game. Harmon had 3 catches for 23 yards and Martin 2 for 25 yards as they drove to a 1st and goal at the 8. The Dolphin defense then lost track of Seay as he ran through the line of scrimmage and made his way to the right flat, where he was wide open for the winning touchdown with 35 seconds left. Miami took over at their own 38-yard line after a short Carney squib kick. Eric Castle's 32-yard pass interference penalty moved the ball to San Diego's 30, from where Marino twice threw incomplete before Stoyanovich came on for the decisive field goal try, which missed wide right by a distance.

While they were hampered by three turnovers and multiple failures to score from inside the Miami 10-yard line, the Chargers dominated time of possession (39:20 to 20:40), total plays run (85 to 47) and total offensive yardage (466 to 282). These advantages were particularly pronounced in the second half as they kept the ball away from Dan Marino by running 50 plays to just 16 by Miami. They advanced to the AFC Championship Game for the first time since 1981.

As well as the officiating errors, an incident at halftime caused controversy, as a power cut affected the lighting in the Dolphins' locker room and forced them to make their offensive adjustments for the second half in a small adjacent room. This caused confusion on the play where Davis caught Parmalee in the end zone for a safety. In 2006, Chargers equipment manager Sid Brooks wrote that the power cut was accidental, being caused when Brock slammed his helmet into a wall in anger and struck an electrical box, though Brooks also stated that his stadium staff made no attempt to fix the problem when the Dolphins reported it.

With the win, the Chargers secured a trip to the AFC Championship. This would end up being their last Divisional Round win until 2007.

==== AFC Championship Game: at Pittsburgh Steelers ====
AFC Championship: (#2) San Diego Chargers at (#1) Pittsburgh Steelers – Game summary

Quarter	1	2	3	4	Total
Chargers	0	3	7	7	17
Steelers	7	3	3	0	13

at Three Rivers Stadium, Pittsburgh, Pennsylvania

- Date: January 15
- Game time: 12:30 p.m. EST
- Game weather: 59 °F (15 °C), relative humidity 82%, wind 14 miles per hour (23 km/h; 12 kn)
- Game attendance: 61,545
- Referee: Gerald Austin
- TV announcers (NBC): Dick Enberg (play-by-play) and Bob Trumpy (color commentator)
- Box score

Game information

First quarter

- PIT – John L. Williams 16-yard pass from Neil O'Donnell (Gary Anderson kick), 7:28. Steelers 7–0. Drive: 13 plays, 67 yards, 7:32.

Second quarter

- SDG – John Carney 20-yard field goal, 3:41. Steelers 7–3. Drive: 6 plays, 77 yards, 3:11.
- PIT – Gary Anderson 39-yard field goal, 0:09. Steelers 10–3. Drive: 12 plays, 51 yards, 3:32.

Third quarter

- PIT – Gary Anderson 23-yard field goal, 10:37. Steelers 13–3. Drive: 9 plays, 50 yards, 3:22.
- SDG – Alfred Pupunu 43-yard pass from Stan Humphries (John Carney kick), 8:03. Steelers 13–10. Drive: 5 plays, 64 yards, 2:34.

Fourth quarter

- SDG – Tony Martin 43-yard pass from Stan Humphries (John Carney kick), 5:13. Chargers 17–13. Drive: 8 plays, 80 yards, 4:44.

Top passers

- SDG – Stan Humphries – 11/22, 165 yards, 2 TD, 1 INT
- PIT – Neil O'Donnell – 32/54, 349 yards, TD

Top rushers

- SDG – Natrone Means – 20 rushes, 69 yards
- PIT – Barry Foster – 20 rushes, 47 yards

Top receivers

- SDG – Alfred Pupunu – 4 receptions, 76 yards, TD
- PIT – Ernie Mills – 8 receptions, 106 yards

San Diego secured their first Super Bowl berth by overcoming a ten-point deficit and making a late goal-line stand against the heavily favored Steelers.

Pittsburgh, who entered the game as nine-point favorites, took the opening kickoff and converted a 4th and 2 en route to a touchdown. The Steelers had chances to add to their lead; Mims forced Barry Foster to fumble near midfield with Carrington recovering, then Pittsburgh were backed up by a holding penalty after reaching the San Diego 27 and eventually punted. San Diego, who had only managed a single first down from their first three possessions, then moved the ball 78 yards in the space of only two plays and a penalty: Means had a 17-yard run and a 15-yard catch before Jefferson drew a 46-yard pass interference penalty from Deon Figures. From a first and goal at the Pittsburgh 2-yard line, three runs by Means lost a yard and Carney made a 20-yard field goal. The Steelers responded by converting three 3rd downs and increasing their lead to 10–3 with a field goal shortly before halftime.

Humphries threw an interception three plays into the second half, and Pittsburgh drove to the Chargers 6-yard line before taking a field goal to go up by ten points. San Diego began their comeback on the following drive, beginning with Coleman's 32-yard kickoff return. They gained two first downs, then the Steeler defense was fooled by play action to Means. Pupunu was left open at the Pittsburgh 20-yard line and completed a 43-yard touchdown. Late in the 3rd quarter, Pittsburgh had a 3rd and 2 at the San Diego 43; O'Neal stopped Foster for a loss of 2 yards, forcing a punt. San Diego's game-winning drive started at their own 20. Pupunu had consecutive catches of 23 and 8 yards, and Means gained 8 yards on 3rd and 1. Means lost 4 yards on the next play, and the Chargers soon faced 3rd and 14 at the Pittsburgh 43. Martin then beat Tim McKyer along the right sideline, catching Humphries' pass as he crossed the goal line. Needing to respond with a touchdown, the Steelers began at their own 17. Neil O'Donnell passed on the first seven plays of the drive, completing all of them to bring up a 1st and goal at the San Diego 9-yard line. On the next three plays, John Parrella stopped Foster for a loss of 1, Gibson nearly intercepted a pass at the goal line, and John L. Williams was tackled by numerous Chargers after a 7-yard catch. On 4th and goal from the 3, O'Donnell aimed for Foster in the front of the end zone, but Gibson arrived in time to knock the ball away with 1:04 to play. Humphries executed three quarterback kneels to run out the clock.

San Diego won despite being outgained by 415 yards to 226. Pittsburgh had been particularly dominant up to the point of their second field goal, with a 279–49 yardage advantage; Humphries at that point had completed only a single pass for 15 yards. Seau led the San Diego defense with 16 tackles (12 solo, 4 assisted) despite playing with a shoulder injury. A sell-out crowd of 68,000 fans greeted the team at Jack Murphy Stadium when they returned home to San Diego, with 10,000 more turned away.

With the win, the Chargers secured their first trip to the Super Bowl in franchise history. However, this would end up being the Chargers last appearance in the AFC Championship until 2007. In addition, as of 2025, this is the only AFC Championship game the Chargers have won.

==== Super Bowl XXIX: vs. San Francisco 49ers ====
Super Bowl XXIX: (A2) San Diego Chargers vs. (N1) San Francisco 49ers – Game summary

Quarter	1	2	3	4	Total
Chargers	7	3	8	8	26
49ers	14	14	14	7	49

at Joe Robbie Stadium, Miami, Florida

- Date: January 29
- Game time: 6:00 p.m. EST
- Game weather: 73 °F (22.8 °C), relative humidity 80%, wind 6 miles per hour (9.7 km/h; 5.2 kn)
- Game attendance: 74,107
- Referee: Jerry Markbreit
- TV announcers (ABC): Al Michaels (play-by-play), Frank Gifford, and Dan Dierdorf (color commentators)
- Box score

Game information

First quarter

- SF – Jerry Rice 44-yard pass from Steve Young (Doug Brien kick), 13:36. 49ers 7–0. Drive: 3 plays, 59 yards, 1:24.
- SF – Ricky Watters 51-yard pass from Steve Young (Doug Brien kick), 10:05. 49ers 14–0. Drive: 4 plays, 79 yards, 1:53.
- SDG – Natrone Means 1-yard run (John Carney kick), 2:44. 49ers 14–7. Drive: 13 plays, 78 yards, 7:21.

Second quarter

- SF – William Floyd 5-yard pass from Steve Young (Doug Brien kick), 13:02. 49ers 21–7. Drive: 10 plays, 70 yards, 4:42.
- SF – Ricky Watters 8-yard pass from Steve Young (Doug Brien kick), 4:44. 49ers 28–7. Drive: 9 plays, 49 yards, 4:51.
- SDG – John Carney 31-yard field goal, 1:44. 49ers 28–10. Drive: 8 plays, 62 yards, 3:00.

Third quarter

- SF – Ricky Watters 9-yard run (Doug Brien kick), 9:35. 49ers 35–10. Drive: 7 plays, 62 yards, 3:45.
- SF – Jerry Rice 15-yard pass from Steve Young (Doug Brien kick), 3:18. 49ers 42–10. Drive: 10 plays, 67 yards, 4:07.
- SDG – Andre Coleman 98-yard kickoff return (Mark Seay pass from Stan Humphries), 3:01. 49ers 42–18. Drive: 0 plays, 0 yards, 0:17.

Fourth quarter

- SF – Jerry Rice 7-yard pass from Steve Young (Doug Brien kick), 13:49. 49ers 49–18. Drive: 6 plays, 32 yards, 1:19.
- SDG – Tony Martin 30-yard pass from Stan Humphries (Alfred Pupunu pass from Stan Humphries), 2:25. Chargers 49–26. Drive: 8 plays, 67 yards, 1:56.

Top passers

- SDG – Stan Humphries – 24/49, 275 yards, TD, 2 INT
- SF – Steve Young – 24/36, 325 yards, 6 TD

Top rushers

- SDG – Natrone Means – 13 rushes, 33 yards, TD
- SF – Steve Young – 5 rushes, 49 yards

Top receivers

- SDG – Mark Seay – 7 receptions, 75 yards
- SF – Jerry Rice – 10 receptions, 149 yards, 3 TD

The 49ers justified their status as 18.5-point favorites with a one-sided win.

San Francisco took the opening kickoff and scored touchdowns on their third and seventh offensive plays to lead 14–0 inside of 5 minutes. San Diego responded with their longest drive of the game, converting 3rd downs via a Humphries quarterback sneak and Harmon's 17-yard catch and 10-yard run. Jefferson drew pass interference from Sanders in the end zone, and Means scored from the 1 on the next play. San Francisco's offense continued to move the ball with ease, coming straight back with another touchdown and adding a fourth two drives later. Bieniemy's 33-yard gain on a screen pass took San Diego to the 49ers 13-yard line, but Martin and Seay both dropped passes in the end zone and the Chargers settled for a field goal. A potential 54-yard touchdown pass from Humphries to Martin was foiled by Eric Davis' diving interception at the goal line, and the halftime score remained 28–10.

The 49ers extended their lead by scoring on their first two possessions of the second half. Coleman then became the third player to score a kickoff return touchdown in Super Bowl history, breaking to the left sideline and easily outpacing the coverage; Seay's subsequent two point conversion was the first in a Super Bowl. San Diego's defense managed to force a three-and-out, but Means lost 4 yards on a 4th and 1 from his own 37 and the 49ers soon added their seventh touchdown. Martin's touchdown and Pupunu's two point conversion completed the scoring.

Excluding a one-play drive at the end of the first half, San Francisco scored touchdowns on seven of their first ten possessions of the game. Coleman had 8 kickoff returns for a total of 244 yards, a playoff record. Despite losing the game, a parade was thrown in honor of the Chargers when they returned to San Diego, attended by a crowd of approximately 150,000. As of today, it remains the Chargers' lone appearance in the Super Bowl.

== Awards ==
Four Chargers were named to the 1995 Pro Bowl, with three of those named to the Associated Press (AP) All-Pro team. Also, Seau received 8 votes for the Defensive Player of the Year Award. (Note: Deion Sanders won the award with 39 votes.)

Player	Position	Pro Bowl starter	Pro Bowl reserve	AP 1st team All-Pro	AP 2nd team All-Pro
John Carney	Kicker	Yes		Yes	
Natrone Means	Running back	Yes			
Leslie O'Neal	Defensive end	Yes			Yes
Junior Seau	Linebacker	Yes		Yes	

== Deaths of players ==
The 1994 Chargers are also remembered for tragedy in the form of numerous untimely deaths, as ten players from the squad have died prematurely since that time.

- June 19, 1995 — Linebacker David Griggs died in a car accident when his vehicle slid off a ramp on Florida's Turnpike, linking to three roads just west of Fort Lauderdale and subsequently slammed into a pole, he was 28 years old.
- May 11, 1996 — Running back Rodney Culver and his wife Karen were among the 110 people (105 passengers, 5 crew members) aboard ValuJet Flight 592 when it crashed into the Florida Everglades, killing everyone aboard. He was 26 years old.
- July 21, 1998 — Linebacker Doug Miller died after being struck twice by lightning during a thunderstorm while camping in Colorado. He was 29 years old.
- May 11, 2008 — Center Curtis Whitley died of a drug overdose. His body was discovered by sheriff deputies in his trailer home in Fort Stockton, Texas, just one day after his 39th birthday. One of the drugs he was known to use was Crystal methamphetamine.
- October 15, 2008 — Defensive end Chris Mims was found dead in his Los Angeles apartment by police officers conducting a welfare check. The most likely cause of death was cardiac arrest due to an enlarged heart since he weighed 456 pounds (207 kg) when he died. He was 38 years old.
- February 26, 2011 — Defensive tackle Shawn Lee died from a cardiac arrest resulting from double pneumonia. Lee had been suffering from diabetes for years prior to his death. He was 44 years old.
- December 8, 2011 — Linebacker Lewis Bush died from an apparent heart attack, just six days after his 42nd birthday.
- May 2, 2012 — Linebacker Junior Seau died in his home in Oceanside, California. Seau was discovered already lifeless by his girlfriend. His death was likely a suicide since a self-inflicted gunshot wound was apparent to the chest. He was 43 years old.
- April 30, 2021 — Center Courtney Hall. Hall's death was announced on April 30, 2021.
- September 3, 2024 — Offensive Lineman Eric Moten died at age 56.
