= Chris Mims =

American football player (1970–2008)

No. 94, 91
- Position: Defensive end

Personal information
- Born: September 29, 1970; Los Angeles, California, U.S.
- Died: October 15, 2008 (aged 38); Los Angeles, California, U.S.
- Listed height: 6 ft 5 in (1.96 m)
- Listed weight: 300 lb (136 kg)

Career information
- High school: Susan Miller Dorsey (Los Angeles)
- College: Tennessee
- NFL draft: 1992: 1st round, 23rd overall pick

Career history
- San Diego Chargers (1992–1996); Washington Redskins (1997); Oakland Raiders (1998)*; San Diego Chargers (1998–1999); Chicago Bears (2000)*
- * Offseason or practice squad member only

Awards and highlights
- PFWA All-Rookie Team (1992); First-team All-SEC (1991)

Career NFL statistics
- Tackles: 221
- Sacks: 42
- Fumble recoveries: 8
- Stats at Pro Football Reference

Christopher Eddie Mims (September 29, 1970 – October 15, 2008) was an American professional football player who was a defensive end in the National Football League (NFL). He played college football for the Tennessee Volunteers. Mims was selected by the San Diego Chargers in the first round of the 1992 NFL draft with the 23rd overall pick. He also spent one season with the Washington Redskins. He retired in 2000 after being released by the Chicago Bears in training camp that same year.

== Early life ==
Mims' father Lorenzo died at 38 in an apparent homicide when Chris was 11. Mims attended Susan Miller Dorsey High School in Los Angeles, California. As a senior, he set the school single season records for sacks and tackles. However, he failed to meet the academic qualifications to attended an NCAA university. Therefore, he chose to attend Los Angeles Pierce College, then Los Angeles Southwest Junior College. After earning better grades, he was recruited by assistant coach A. J. Christoff to the University of Tennessee where he spent two seasons. While at Tennessee, he recorded 90 tackles and 9.5 sacks.

In the October 18, 2010, issue of Sports Illustrated, former NFL agent Josh Luchs alleged that he paid Mims 'about $500 a month' during his last year at the University of Tennessee.

== Professional career ==
Mims was selected in the first round (23rd overall) of the 1992 NFL draft. As a rookie, he appeared in 16 games with four starts. During his rookie season, he recorded 53 tackles, 10 sacks, one forced fumble and one fumble recovery as well as recording a safety. In 1993, he appeared in 16 games with seven starts. He recorded 32 tackles, seven sacks, two forced fumbles. For the 1994 season, he started all 16 games. He recorded 35 tackles (28 solo.), 11 sacks, three forced fumbles and two fumble recoveries. In 1995, he started all 15 games he appeared in. He recorded 28 tackles (24 solo.), two sacks, one forced fumble and one fumble recovery. For 1996, he start all 15 games he appeared in. He recorded 20 tackles (12 solo.), six sacks, one forced fumble and one fumble recovery.

After spending five seasons with the Chargers, Mims signed as an unrestricted free agent with the Washington Redskins on June 10, 1997. In 1997, his lone season with the Redskins, he appeared in 11 games with seven starts. For the season, he recorded 16 tackles (10 solo.), four sacks and one forced fumble.

One year, to the day after signing with the Redskins, Mims re-signed with the Chargers to a one-year contract. In 1998, after returning to the Chargers, he appeared in six games. For the season, he recorded three tackles, and two sacks. On February 8, 1999, he re-signed with the Chargers on a two-year contract. For 1999, he appeared in nine games. For the season, he recorded five tackles (four solo.). He was released on October 9, and re-signed on October 16. He was released again, for the final time by the Chargers on December 3, 1999.

On February 15, 2000, Mims was signed by the Chicago Bears. He was released on August 22, 2000, after missing a practice because he overslept.

=== Career statistics ===
| Season | | | | Defense | | | | | Fumbles | |
| Year | Team | GP | GS | Tack. | Solo. | Ass. | Sacks | TFL | FF | FR |
|---|---|---|---|---|---|---|---|---|---|---|
| 1992 | SD | 16 | 4 | 53 | – | – | 10 | – | 1 | 1 |
| 1993 | SD | 16 | 7 | 32 | – | – | 7 | – | 2 | 2 |
| 1994 | SD | 16 | 16 | 35 | 28 | 7 | 11 | – | 3 | 2 |
| 1995 | SD | 15 | 15 | 28 | 24 | 4 | 2 | – | 1 | 1 |
| 1996 | SD | 15 | 15 | 20 | 12 | 8 | 6 | – | 2 | 2 |
| 1997 | WAS | 11 | 7 | 16 | 10 | 6 | 4 | – | 1 | 0 |
| 1998 | SD | 6 | 0 | 3 | 0 | 3 | 2 | – | 0 | 0 |
| 1999 | SD | 9 | 0 | 5 | 4 | 1 | 0 | – | 0 | 0 |
| Career | | 104 | 64 | 192 | – | – | 42 | – | 10 | 8 |

== Later years and death ==
Mims was the sixth member of the 1994 San Diego Chargers AFC championship team to die young, the others being David Griggs, Rodney Culver, Doug Miller, Junior Seau, and Curtis Whitley. During his final years, Mims was unable to take care of himself and he lived on disability payments and avoided bill collectors.

On October 15, 2008, Mims was found dead in his Los Angeles apartment by police officers conducting a welfare check. The cause of death was determined to be an enlarged heart. He weighed 456 pounds or 207 kilograms at the time of his death. A few years prior to his death, he had suffered a stroke. Mims like his father Lorenzo died at 38 .

== Personal life ==
Mims had one son, Christopher Eddie Mims Jr.

=== Legal troubles ===
During his playing career, Mims had numerous legal troubles. Among them were charges of assault, vandalism, and driving under the influence. He was taken to court more than 20 times for unpaid bills in San Diego County. He is reported to have defaulted on a $243,750 house loan during the Chargers' Super Bowl season. He neglected bills for his Mercedes-Benz 600 SEL, attorneys' fees, carpet bills, liquor bills and, at times, child support.

In 1995, he was cited by a Superior Court judge for not making monthly payments of $5,000 to a man whose windshield he smashed in a traffic dispute. Mr. Mims got out of his vehicle in standstill traffic on Interstate 163 near Scripps Ranch, Ca. and attempted to fight a man in another vehicle. Mr. Mims broke the drivers side window in an attempt to harm the driver. The driver was a retired LAPD officer, Captain Robert Michael. Mims once realizing, fled the scene but San Diego Police caught and cited him with the San Diego Chargers ultimately paying the court ordered restitution.

In 1998, he was convicted of refusing to take a blood-alcohol test after being pulled over on suspicion of driving drunk.

In 1999, he pleaded guilty to a misdemeanor assault charge after he hit a man with a belt outside a Del Taco.
