= Stan Humphries =

American football player (born 1965)

No. 16, 12
- Position: Quarterback

Personal information
- Born: April 14, 1965 (age 61); Shreveport, Louisiana, U.S.
- Listed height: 6 ft 2 in (1.88 m)
- Listed weight: 223 lb (101 kg)

Career information
- High school: Southwood (Shreveport)
- College: Northeast Louisiana (1984–1987)
- NFL draft: 1988: 6th round, 159th overall pick

Career history
- Washington Redskins (1988–1991); San Diego Chargers (1992–1997)

Awards and highlights
- Super Bowl champion (XXVI); Los Angeles Chargers Hall of Fame; San Diego Chargers 50th Anniversary Team; NCAA I-AA national champion (1987); NFL record: Longest touchdown pass: 99 yards (tied)

Career NFL statistics
- Passing attempts: 2,516
- Passing completions: 1,431
- Completion percentage: 56.9%
- TD–INT: 89–84
- Passing yards: 17,191
- Passer rating: 75.8
- Stats at Pro Football Reference

William Stanley Humphries (born April 14, 1965) is an American former professional football player who was a quarterback in the National Football League (NFL) for the Washington Redskins and San Diego Chargers. He played college football for the Northeast Louisiana Indians and he was selected by the Redskins in the sixth round of the 1988 NFL draft. In the 1991 NFL season Humphries won Super Bowl XXVI with Washington as a backup, then was traded to the Chargers before the 1992 season. He led the Chargers to three playoff runs and an appearance in Super Bowl XXIX in 1994.

== College career ==
Playing for Northeast Louisiana (now Louisiana–Monroe), Humphries was quarterback on the team that won the 1987 NCAA Division I-AA Football Championship Game. In two seasons, Humphries passed for 4,395 yards and 29 touchdowns. He still holds the record for 300-yard passing games with eight.

== Professional career ==
Pre-draft measurables
Height	Weight	Hand span	40-yard dash	10-yard split	20-yard split	20-yard shuttle	Vertical jump
6 ft 1 7/8 in (1.88 m)	223 lb (101 kg)	10 1/4 in (0.26 m)	4.93 s	1.75 s	2.84 s	4.56 s	28.0 in (0.71 m)
All values from NFL Combine

=== Washington Redskins ===
Humphries was selected 159th overall by the Redskins in the sixth round of the 1988 NFL draft. He made his first professional start in 1990 in Phoenix against the Cardinals with regular starter Mark Rypien sidelined with an injury. Humphries went on to pass for 1,015 yards and three touchdowns in seven games in 1990. The following season, he won a Super Bowl ring with the Redskins as Rypien's backup.

=== San Diego Chargers ===
Humphries was traded to the San Diego Chargers before the start of the 1992 season following a preseason injury to starting Chargers QB John Friesz. The two teams ran the same offense, allowing Humphries to quickly make an impact. He passed for 3,356 yards, which ranked fifth in the league in 1992. He helped lead the Chargers, who were 4–12 in 1991 and stumbled out to an 0–4 start in 1992, to finish with an 11–5 record that won the AFC West and ended the Chargers' decade-long playoff drought. To this day, the 1992 San Diego Chargers are the only NFL team to make the playoffs after an 0–4 start. He played with a separated left shoulder in the 1992 AFC Wild-Card Game, a 17–0 win over the Kansas City Chiefs, their first home playoff game since the 1980 AFC Championship game. Their season ended the next week in a 31–0 loss to the Miami Dolphins in the AFC Divisional Playoffs.

In 1994, Humphries led the Chargers with clutch performances through an impressive series of victories in the NFL Playoffs. It started with the Chargers rallying from a 21–6 halftime deficit at home to defeat the Miami Dolphins (led by Hall of Fame quarterback Dan Marino) with a 22–21 victory in the AFC divisional playoffs, earning the Chargers a trip to the AFC Championship Game the next week at Pittsburgh. The Pittsburgh Steelers were favored by 10 1/2 points, and some Steeler players the week prior to the game had made a Super Bowl rap video, assuming they would be the ones going to the Super Bowl. In what would become one of pro football's all-time great upsets, the Chargers again rallied from a 13–3 deficit late in the third quarter and held off a furious last-minute Pittsburgh drive with a goal-line stand to win the AFC championship 17–13 at Pittsburgh's Three Rivers Stadium. Thus the Chargers earned a trip to Miami and Super Bowl XXIX, the first and only Super Bowl appearance in franchise history. Humphries executed the first successful two-point conversion in the Super Bowl (which was adopted by the NFL at the start of the 1994 season), throwing a pass to Mark Seay. They were greeted by 70,000 fans at San Diego Jack Murphy Stadium upon arriving back from Pittsburgh. Despite losing Super Bowl XXIX 49–26 to the San Francisco 49ers, more than 100,000 fans greeted the Chargers when they arrived back in San Diego after the game.

In 1997, Humphries was forced to retire after a series of concussions. During his career, he led the Chargers to three playoff appearances and the franchise's only Super Bowl appearance. Humphries started for San Diego from 1992 to 1997, making 81 starts in 88 games while completing 1,431 of 2,516 passes for 17,191 yards and 89 touchdowns. San Diego was 47–29 (62 percent) in regular-season games and 3–3 in playoff contests he started. He was inducted into the Chargers Hall of Fame in 2002. In 2009, he was one of four quarterbacks named on the franchise's 50th anniversary team. In 2004, Humphries was also inducted by the San Diego Hall of Champions into the Breitbard Hall of Fame honoring San Diego's finest athletes both on and off the playing surface. He was inducted into the Louisiana Sports Hall of Fame in 2007.

== NFL career statistics ==
Legend
	Led the league
**Bold**	Career high

=== Regular season ===
Year	Team	Games			Passing									Rushing					Sacks	
Year	Team	GP	GS	Record	Cmp	Att	Pct	Yds	Y/A	Lng	TD	Int	Rtg	Att	Yds	Avg	Lng	TD	Sck	Yds
1989	WAS	2	0	0-0	5	10	50.0	91	**9.1**	39	1	1	75.4	5	10	2.0	9	0	3	9
1990	WAS	7	5	3-2	91	156	58.3	1,015	6.5	44	3	10	57.5	23	**106**	**4.6**	17	2	9	62
1992	SDG	**16**	**15**	**11-4**	263	454	57.9	3,356	7.4	67	16	**18**	76.4	28	79	2.8	25	**4**	**28**	218
1993	SDG	12	10	6-4	173	324	53.4	1,981	6.1	48	12	10	71.5	8	37	**4.6**	**27**	0	18	142
1994	SDG	15	**15**	**11-4**	264	453	58.3	3,209	7.1	**99**	17	12	**81.6**	19	19	1.0	8	0	25	**223**
1995	SDG	15	**15**	9-6	**282**	**478**	**59.0**	**3,381**	7.1	51	17	14	80.4	**33**	53	1.6	18	1	23	197
1996	SDG	13	13	7-6	232	416	55.8	2,670	6.4	63	**18**	13	76.7	21	28	1.3	7	0	20	187
1997	SDG	8	8	3-5	121	225	53.8	1,488	6.6	72	5	6	70.7	13	24	1.8	11	0	18	144
Career		88	81	50-31	1,431	2,516	56.9	17,191	6.8	99	89	84	75.8	150	356	2.4	27	7	144	1,182

=== Playoffs ===
Year	Team	Games			Passing									Rushing					Sacks	
Year	Team	GP	GS	Record	Cmp	Att	Pct	Yds	Y/A	Lng	TD	Int	Rtg	Att	Yds	Avg	Lng	TD	Sck	Yds
1992	SDG	2	2	1-1	32	67	47.8	339	5.1	**44**	0	4	38.1	2	10	5.0	10	0	**6**	**57**
1994	SDG	**3**	**3**	**2-1**	**63**	**114**	**55.3**	**716**	**6.3**	43	**4**	**5**	**67.7**	**7**	1	0.1	3	0	5	35
1995	SDG	1	1	0-1	23	47	48.9	292	6.2	26	2	4	47.5	4	**32**	**8.0**	**17**	0	1	8
Career		6	6	3-3	118	228	51.8	1,347	5.9	44	6	13	54.8	13	43	3.3	17	0	12	100

== Post-playing career ==
Humphries became a college football commentator, and also hosts his namesake celebrity golf tournament, which has raised more than $1 million over the years for Rady Children's Hospital in San Diego.

Humphries has served as the head girls basketball coach at Ouachita Christian School in Monroe, Louisiana since 2017.

=== Golf ===
Humphries has qualified for amateur golf's United States Senior Amateur Championship in 2022 and the R&A Senior Amateur Championship in 2023, finishing fourth in the latter.
