= Tony Martin (American football) =

American football player (born 1965)

No. 89, 81, 80
- Position: Wide receiver

Personal information
- Born: September 5, 1965 (age 61); Miami, Florida, U.S.
- Listed height: 6 ft 0 in (1.83 m)
- Listed weight: 181 lb (82 kg)

Career information
- High school: Miami Northwestern
- College: Mesa State
- NFL draft: 1989: 5th round, 126th overall pick

Career history
- New York Jets (1989)*; Miami Dolphins (1989–1993); San Diego Chargers (1994–1997); Atlanta Falcons (1998); Miami Dolphins (1999–2000); Atlanta Falcons (2001)
- * Offseason or practice squad member only

Awards and highlights
- Second-team All-Pro (1996); Pro Bowl (1996); NFL receiving touchdowns co-leader (1996); NFL record: Longest receiving touchdown: 99 yards (tied)

Career NFL statistics
- Receptions: 593
- Receiving yards: 9,065
- Receiving Touchdowns: 56
- Stats at Pro Football Reference

Tony Derrick Martin (born September 5, 1965) is an American former professional football player who was a wide receiver in the National Football League (NFL). He was selected by the New York Jets in the fifth round of the 1989 NFL draft. He earned second-team All-Pro honors with the San Diego Chargers in 1996.

== Professional career ==
Pre-draft measurables
Height	Weight	40-yard dash	10-yard split	20-yard split	20-yard shuttle	Vertical jump
6 ft 0 1/8 in (1.83 m)	174 lb (79 kg)	4.44 s	1.50 s	2.63 s	4.22 s	39.0 in (0.99 m)

Martin was a 6'0" wide receiver out of Mesa State College in Grand Junction, Colorado. The New York Jets selected him 126th overall with their fifth round pick of the 1989 NFL draft. Martin, however, did not make the opening day roster in New York, and was placed on waivers. The Dolphins picked him up as a free agent prior to the 1990 NFL season.

Martin appeared in all 16 games that season for the Dolphins, starting five. He caught 29 passes for 388 yards and two touchdowns. He also returned 26 punts for Miami, for 140 yards.

He again played every game for Miami in 1991, catching 27 total passes for 434 yards and two touchdowns. On two occasions that season Martin would eclipse the 100-yard barrier.

1992 would again see Martin appear in every game for the Dolphins, starting three and catching 33 passes for 553 yards and two touchdowns.

Martin was limited by injuries to 12 games in 1993. He only caught 20 passes for 347 yards and three touchdowns. He did manage to log his third career 100-yard game, with a then career high 110 yards against the Washington Redskins in week four. The Dolphins won the game, 17–10.

The San Diego Chargers acquired Martin during the 1994 offseason, and in four years with the club, he caught 288 passes for 4,184 yards and 33 touchdowns. In 1996, he led the NFL with 14 touchdowns and received his only Pro Bowl invitation.

After joining the Atlanta Falcons for the 1998 season, Martin gained 1,181 yards on 66 passes, six of them for touchdowns. The Dolphins reacquired him prior to the 1999 season.

Martin had his best Miami season in 1999, catching 67 passes for 1,037 yards and five touchdowns. 2000 would see the 35-year-old receiver's skills start to decline, and his stats reflected it, as he caught only 26 passes for 393 yards that year.

Martin rejoined the Falcons for the 2001 season, gaining 548 yards on 37 passes. He would play 15 games before being released with one game left in the season.

Martin started 26 games for the Dolphins over six seasons and appeared in 86 overall for the team. He totaled 202 catches for 3,152 yards and 14 touchdowns.

== NFL career statistics ==
Receiving

Year	Team	GP	Rec	Yards	Avg	Lng	TD	FD	Fum	Lost
1990	MIA	16	29	388	13.4	45	2	0	0	0
1991	MIA	16	27	434	16.1	54	2	16	0	0
1992	MIA	16	33	553	16.8	55	2	26	1	0
1993	MIA	12	20	347	17.4	80	3	14	1	1
1994	SD	16	50	885	17.7	99	7	39	0	0
1995	SD	16	90	1,224	13.6	51	6	60	3	3
1996	SD	16	85	1,171	13.8	55	14	59	0	0
1997	SD	16	63	904	14.3	72	6	45	0	0
1998	ATL	16	66	1,181	17.9	62	6	56	0	0
1999	MIA	16	67	1,037	15.5	69	5	51	0	0
2000	MIA	10	26	393	15.1	44	0	19	0	0
2001	ATL	11	37	548	14.8	63	3	29	0	0
Career		177	593	9,065	15.3	99	56	414	5	4

Returning Stats

Year	Team	GP	PRet	Yards	TD	FC	Lng	KRet	Yards	TD	FC	Lng
1990	MIA	16	26	140	0	0	35	0	0	0	0	0
1991	MIA	16	1	10	0	0	10	0	0	0	0	0
1992	MIA	16	1	0	0	0	0	0	0	0	0	0
1994	SD	16	0	0	0	0	0	8	167	0	0	29
Career		64	28	150	0	0	35	8	167	0	0	29

Rushing Stats

Year	Team	GP	Att	Yards	Avg	Lng	TD	FD	Fum	Lost
1990	MIA	16	1	8	8.0	8	0	0	0	0
1992	MIA	16	1	-2	-2.0	-2	0	0	0	0
1993	MIA	12	1	6	6.0	6	0	0	0	0
1994	SD	16	2	-9	-4.5	4	0	0	1	0
1999	MIA	16	1	-6	-6.0	-6	0	0	0	0
Career		76	6	-3	-0.5	8	0	0	1	0

== Personal life ==
He is divorced from actress LisaRaye McCoy.
