= Aaron Laing =

American football player (born 1971)

No. 84, 86
- Position: Tight end

Personal information
- Born: July 19, 1971 (age 55); Houston, Texas, U.S.
- Listed height: 6 ft 3 in (1.91 m)
- Listed weight: 260 lb (118 kg)

Career information
- High school: Sharpstown (Houston)
- College: New Mexico State
- NFL draft: 1994: 5th round, 137th overall pick

Career history
- San Diego Chargers (1994–1995); St. Louis Rams (1996–1998); Cleveland Browns (1999)*
- * Offseason or practice squad member only

Career NFL statistics
- Receptions: 18
- Receiving yards: 147
- Touchdowns: 1
- Stats at Pro Football Reference

Aaron Matthew Laing (born July 19, 1971) is an American former professional football player who was a tight end in the National Football League (NFL) for the San Diego Chargers and St. Louis Rams. He was selected in the fifth round of the 1994 NFL draft with the 137th overall pick. He played college football for the Lamar Cardinals and New Mexico State Aggies.
