= Mark Seay =

American football player (born 1967)

No. 84, 82, 81
- Position: Wide receiver

Personal information
- Born: April 11, 1967 (age 59); Los Angeles, California, U.S.
- Listed height: 6 ft 0 in (1.83 m)
- Listed weight: 175 lb (79 kg)

Career information
- High school: San Bernardino (San Bernardino, California)
- College: Long Beach State
- NFL draft: 1992: undrafted

Career history
- San Francisco 49ers (1992–1993)*; San Diego Chargers (1993–1995); Philadelphia Eagles (1996–1997); Cleveland Browns (1999)*
- * Offseason or practice squad member only

Career NFL statistics
- Receptions: 135
- Receiving yards: 1,629
- Receiving touchdowns: 10
- Stats at Pro Football Reference

Mark Edward Seay (born April 11, 1967) is an American former professional football player who was a wide receiver in the National Football League (NFL) for the San Francisco 49ers, San Diego Chargers and Philadelphia Eagles. He played college football for Long Beach State 49ers. Seay has the distinction of being the first NFL player to score a two-point conversion in Super Bowl history.

== Early life ==
Seay played wide receiver in football and center fielder in baseball at Compton High School, but transferred in 1981 to San Bernardino High School after his family decided to move. He would end up breaking many of the school's football offensive records, while helping lead the team to the playoff quarterfinals in his senior season.

== Professional baseball career ==
After graduating from high school, he spent two years in the Texas Rangers farm system.

== College football career ==
Seay accepted a football scholarship at Cal State Long Beach in 1987. The following year [1988] while attending his sister's children's Halloween party, shots were fired outside the home, compelling him to shield his 2-year-old niece with his body. As a result, he was injured with a .38-caliber bullet that pierced through his pelvis, kidney, and lung, stopping near his heart (where the bullet still remains). He was hospitalized for 2 1/2 weeks, lost a kidney, and spent two months eating only soup, while keeping to strict bed rest.

In 1989, he rejoined the football team, but school officials deemed him medically ineligible, to avoid legal liability in the event that the bullet close to his heart became dislodged, or that a hit might risk damage to his remaining kidney. He sued the university, but before the case went to court, former NFL great George Allen, who had just been named the new Cal State Long Beach head coach, helped him return to the team. As part of a compromise, he dropped his lawsuit, signed a waiver absolving the university from liability, wore additional protective equipment (a pad and flat jacket to protect his back and hip), and took urine tests after each game.

As a junior and senior, he earned second-team All-Big West honors at wide receiver, with Allen going on record saying: "He's an example for all of us, what I call a solid citizen. He's a leader. One of the highlights of my coaching career is having a guy like Mark Seay on my team."

Seay finished his four seasons with 132 receptions for 2,075 yards and 13 touchdowns, and added another 2,121 yards returning kickoffs.

== Professional football career ==
=== San Francisco 49ers ===
In 1992, with Bruce Allen (George Allen's son) as his agent, he was signed as an undrafted free agent by the San Francisco 49ers, after accepting a similar liability waiver as he did in college. He would make the team's practice squad, before being released in 1993 at the end of training camp.

=== San Diego Chargers ===
In 1993, the San Diego Chargers claimed him off waivers and kept him inactive for all but one regular season game. In the 1994 NFL season, he became a favorite target of quarterback Stan Humphries as a slot receiver, tying the team lead in receptions with Ronnie Harmon and helping the Chargers reach Super Bowl XXIX against the San Francisco 49ers, after catching a game-winning touchdown pass in a playoff game against the Miami Dolphins. In Super Bowl XXIX, Seay was on the receiving end of the first successful two-point conversion in Super Bowl history, via a Stan Humphries pass. (The rule was adopted by the NFL at the start of the 1994 season.)

=== Philadelphia Eagles ===
In 1996, he signed as a free agent with the Philadelphia Eagles where he played wide receiver and on special teams. He retired at the end of the 1997 season, with 135 receptions for 1,629 yards and 10 touchdowns.

== Personal life ==
His father, Elvin Seay Sr., died from a stroke when Mark was 14. In 2003, his older brother, Elvin Seay Jr., 41, was shot in a San Bernardino motel parking lot and spent 11 months in a coma before dying. In 2006 his younger brother, James Seay, 37, was shot to death in the family's backyard by two assailants.

In 2008, he graduated from the San Bernardino Valley College Extended Basic Police Academy and received a B.A. in criminal justice from California State University, San Bernardino. Seay is also a motivational speaker.
