= Curtis Whitley =

American football player (1969–2008)

No. 64, 66
- Position: Center

Personal information
- Born: May 10, 1969; Smithfield, North Carolina, U.S.
- Died: May 11, 2008 (aged 39); Fort Stockton, Texas, U.S.
- Listed height: 6 ft 1 in (1.85 m)
- Listed weight: 295 lb (134 kg)

Career information
- High school: Smithfield-Selma
- College: Chowan; Clemson
- NFL draft: 1992: 5th round, 117th overall pick
- Expansion draft: 1995: 7th round, 14th overall pick

Career history
- San Diego Chargers (1992–1994); Carolina Panthers (1995–1996); Oakland Raiders (1997–1998); Tampa Bay Storm (2000)

Career NFL statistics
- Games played: 72
- Games started: 27
- Fumble recoveries: 2
- Stats at Pro Football Reference

Curtis Wayne Whitley (May 10, 1969 – May 11, 2008) was an American professional football player who was a center in the National Football League (NFL). He played college football for the Clemson Tigers and was selected by the San Diego Chargers in the fifth round of the 1992 NFL draft with the 117th overall pick. Whitley played six seasons for the Chargers (1992–1994), Carolina Panthers (1995–1996), and Oakland Raiders (1997).

Born in Smithfield, North Carolina, Whitley graduated from Smithfield-Selma High School before attending Clemson University. In the NFL, he was selected by the Carolina Panthers in the 1995 NFL expansion draft.

Whitley was found dead from a drug overdose in Texas on May 11, 2008, one day after his 39th birthday.

== Sources ==
- Curtis Whitley's career stats
