= Doug Miller (American football) =

American football player (1969–1998)

No. 54
- Position: Linebacker

Personal information
- Born: October 29, 1969; Cheyenne, Wyoming, U.S.
- Died: July 21, 1998 (aged 28); Dotsero, Colorado, U.S.
- Listed height: 6 ft 3 in (1.91 m)
- Listed weight: 237 lb (108 kg)

Career information
- High school: Sturgis Brown (Sturgis, South Dakota)
- College: South Dakota State
- NFL draft: 1993: 7th round, 188th overall pick

Career history
- San Diego Chargers (1993–1994)

Career NFL statistics
- Games played: 23
- Stats at Pro Football Reference

Douglas Alan Miller (October 29, 1969 – July 21, 1998) was an American professional football player who was a linebacker for the San Diego Chargers of the National Football League (NFL). He played college football for the South Dakota State Jackrabbits and was selected by the Chargers in the seventh round of the 1993 NFL draft with the 188th overall pick. Miller played in 23 games for San Diego from 1993 to 1994.

Miller died in 1998 after being struck by lightning twice in Colorado. He was there to participate in a charity golf tournament and to go camping with a friend.
