= 1997 Denver Broncos season =

American football team season

- Owner: Pat Bowlen
- General manager: John Beake and Mike Shanahan
- President: Pat Bowlen
- Head coach: Mike Shanahan
- Offensive coordinator: Gary Kubiak
- Defensive coordinator: Greg Robinson
- Home stadium: Mile High Stadium

Results
- Record: 12–4
- Division place: 2nd AFC West
- Playoffs: Won Wild Card Playoffs (vs. Jaguars) 42–17; Won Divisional Playoffs (at Chiefs) 14–10; Won AFC Championship (at Steelers) 24–21; Won Super Bowl XXXII (vs. Packers) 31–24
- Pro Bowlers: QB John Elway; RB Terrell Davis; TE Shannon Sharpe; C Tom Nalen

The 1997 season was the Denver Broncos' 28th season in the National Football League (NFL) and their 38th overall. The Broncos finished the season with a record of 12–4, finishing second in the AFC West, and winning Super Bowl XXXII. The Broncos were the second wild card team since the 1970 merger to win a Super Bowl, joining the 1980 Oakland Raiders.

The 1997 season saw the addition of the Denver Broncos' newest wordmark and logo. Their new logo featured a newer, dynamic Bronco, which has been the team's logo since the 1997 season. The new default team colors unveiled prior to the 1997 season were navy blue jerseys with orange and white pants with orange. This would continue until 2012, when they assigned the all navy blue uniforms as the "Main alternate" slot, making the primary uniforms have orange tops, white bottoms and orange/white shoes.

== Offseason ==
=== NFL draft ===
1997 Denver Broncos draft
Round	Pick	Player	Position	College	Notes
1	28	Trevor Pryce *	Defensive tackle	Clemson	
3	67	Dan Neil	Guard	Texas	
4	124	Cory Gilliard	Cornerback	Ball State	
Made roster * Made at least one Pro Bowl during career

== Season summary ==
Having lost a disappointing playoff game to Jacksonville the year before, many thought this might be John Elway's last chance to win a Super Bowl. They started off the season by winning their first six games, beating the Chiefs, Seahawks, Rams, Bengals, Falcons and Patriots in the first game between the last two unbeaten NFL teams since 1973. They then lost to the Raiders, then defeated the Bills, Seahawks, and Panthers. They then lost to the Chiefs, beat the Raiders and the Chargers, lost to the Steelers and the 49ers, but finished the season with a win against the Chargers.

They made the playoffs as a wildcard and advanced against the Jaguars and Chiefs and defeated the Steelers in the 1997 AFC Championship Game. They then won Super Bowl XXXII against the Packers 31–24, only the second team since the NFL/AFL merger in 1970 to ever win a Super Bowl as a wildcard, and the first AFC team to win the title since the Los Angeles Raiders in Super Bowl XVIII following the 1983 season. The win was a big morale boost to Denver and the Broncos, who had suffered through four previous Super Bowl losses, and especially Elway, who had led three of those defeats.

The 1997 Broncos were tenth in the league in total passing yards with 3704 and fourth in the league in total rushing yards with 2378. They finished with 6082 total yards, first in the NFL. They were fourth in total yards given up with 4969. They were also first in total points scored with 472. They were seventh in total points allowed with 287.

The team's 12–4 record is their fifth-best 16-game season in franchise history.

During the season John Elway threw for 3635 yards and Terrell Davis rushed for 1750 yards. Rod Smith had 70 receptions for 1180 yards and Ed McCaffrey had 45 receptions for 590 yards. Tight end Shannon Sharpe has 72 receptions for 1107 yards. Kicker Jason Elam kicked 26 field goals out of 36 attempted. Davis, Elway, Tom Nalen, Sharpe, and Neil Smith made the Pro Bowl.

== Personnel ==
=== Staff ===
1997 Denver Broncos staff
Front office: President and chief executive officer – Pat Bowlen; General manager – John Beake; Director of player personnel – Neal Dahlen; Director of pro scouting – Jack Elway; Director of college scouting – Ted Sundquist; College Scouting Consultant – Jerry Frei; College Scout – Dave Gettleman; Head coaches: Head coach – Mike Shanahan; Assistant head coach/offensive line – Alex Gibbs; Offensive coaches: Offensive coordinator/quarterbacks – Gary Kubiak; Running backs – Bobby Turner; Wide receivers – Mike Heimerdinger; Tight ends – Brian Pariani; Assistant offensive line/Assistant Strength and Conditioning – Barney Chavous; Offensive assistant – Dwain Painter; Offensive assistant – Ricky Porter	Defensive coaches: Defensive coordinator – Greg Robinson; Defensive line – George Dyer; Linebackers – Frank Bush; Defensive backs – Ed Donatell; Defensive assistant – Rick Smith; Pass Rush Specialist – John Teerlinck; Special teams coaches: Special teams – Rick Dennison; Strength and conditioning: Strength and conditioning – Rich Tuten; Assistant Strength and Conditioning – Greg Saporta

=== Roster ===
1997 Denver Broncos roster
Quarterbacks (QB): 6 Bubby Brister; 7 John Elway; 8 Jeff Lewis; Running backs (RB): 30 Terrell Davis; 29 Howard Griffith FB; 22 Vaughn Hebron KR; 31 Derek Loville; 37 Anthony Lynn; 42 Detron Smith FB; Wide receivers (WR): 83 Flipper Anderson; 85 Willie Green; 81 Patrick Jeffers; 87 Ed McCaffrey; 80 Rod Smith; 88 Sir Mawn Wilson; Tight ends (TE): 89 Dwayne Carswell; 86 Byron Chamberlain; 84 Shannon Sharpe	Offensive linemen (OL): 70 Jamie Brown T; 63 David Diaz-Infante; 75 Brian Habib G; 77 Tony Jones T; 66 Tom Nalen C; 62 Dan Neil G; 69 Mark Schlereth G; 74 Harry Swayne T; 65 Gary Zimmerman T; Defensive linemen (DL): 96 Harald Hasselbach DE; 72 Ernest Jones DE/DT; 97 Mike Lodish DT; 93 Trevor Pryce DT; 99 David Richie DT; 90 Neil Smith DE; 98 Maa Tanuvasa DT; 94 Keith Traylor NT; 91 Alfred Williams DE	Linebackers (LB): 57 Allen Aldridge MLB; 56 Keith Burns MLB; 59 Glenn Cadrez OLB; 50 Jon Hesse OLB; 51 John Mobley OLB; 53 Bill Romanowski OLB; 58 Steve Russ OLB; Defensive backs (DB): 27 Steve Atwater FS; 34 Tyrone Braxton SS; 39 Ray Crockett CB; 33 Dedrick Dodge FS; 23 Darrien Gordon CB/PR; 21 Randy Hilliard CB; 25 Darrius Johnson CB; 26 Tim McKyer CB; 32 Tony Veland SS; Special teams (ST): 1 Jason Elam K; 16 Tom Rouen P	Practice squad: -- Chris Banks G; 55 Hillary Butler LB; 48 George Coghill S; 82 David Gamble WR; -- Randy Bierman T; Reserve: 79 Jumpy Geathers DT (IR); 20 Tory James CB (IR); 60 K. C. Jones C (IR); 24 Selwyn Jones CB (IR); 78 Matt Lepsis T (NF-Inj.); 53 active, 5 inactive, 5 practice squad Rookies in italics

== Preseason ==
Week	Date	Opponent	Result	Record	Venue	Attendance	Recap
1	July 26	Buffalo Bills	W 31–10	1–0	Mile High Stadium	69,739	Recap
2	August 4	vs. Miami Dolphins	L 19–38	1–1	Estadio Guillermo Cañedo (Mexico City)	104,629	Recap
3	August 9	at Carolina Panthers	W 23–13	2–1	Ericsson Stadium	68,296	Recap
4	August 17	at New England Patriots	L 21–31	2–2	Foxboro Stadium	55,354	Recap
5	August 23	San Francisco 49ers	W 31–17	3–2	Mile High Stadium	69,847	Recap

== Regular season ==
=== Schedule ===
Week	Date	Opponent	Result	Record	Venue	Recap
1	August 31	**Kansas City Chiefs**	**W** 19–3	1–0	Mile High Stadium	Recap
2	September 7	at **Seattle Seahawks**	**W** 35–14	2–0	Kingdome	Recap
3	September 14	St. Louis Rams	**W** 35–14	3–0	Mile High Stadium	Recap
4	September 21	Cincinnati Bengals	**W** 38–20	4–0	Mile High Stadium	Recap
5	September 28	at Atlanta Falcons	**W** 29–21	5–0	Georgia Dome	Recap
6	October 6	New England Patriots	**W** 34–13	6–0	Mile High Stadium	Recap
7	Bye					
8	October 19	at **Oakland Raiders**	**L** 25–28	6–1	Oakland–Alameda County Coliseum	Recap
9	October 26	at Buffalo Bills	**W** 23–20 (OT)	7–1	Rich Stadium	Recap
10	November 2	**Seattle Seahawks**	**W** 30–27	8–1	Mile High Stadium	Recap
11	November 9	Carolina Panthers	**W** 34–0	9–1	Mile High Stadium	Recap
12	November 16	at **Kansas City Chiefs**	**L** 22–24	9–2	Arrowhead Stadium	Recap
13	November 24	**Oakland Raiders**	**W** 31–3	10–2	Mile High Stadium	Recap
14	November 30	at **San Diego Chargers**	**W** 38–28	11–2	Qualcomm Stadium	Recap
15	December 7	at Pittsburgh Steelers	**L** 24–35	11–3	Three Rivers Stadium	Recap
16	December 15	at San Francisco 49ers	**L** 17–34	11–4	3Com Park	Recap
17	December 21	**San Diego Chargers**	**W** 38–3	12–4	Mile High Stadium	Recap
Note: Intra-division opponents are in **bold** text.

== Game summaries ==
=== Week 1 ===
Team	1	2	3	4	Total
Chiefs	0	0	3	0	3
• Broncos	3	6	0	10	19

- Date: August 31
- Location: Mile High Stadium
- Game start: 2:00 pm MDT
- Referee: Ed Hochuli
- TV announcers (NBC): Dick Enberg, Paul Maguire, and Phil Simms

=== Week 2 ===
Team	1	2	3	4	Total
• Broncos	10	3	15	7	35
Seahawks	0	14	0	0	14

- Date: September 7
- Location: Kingdome
- Game start: 2:00 pm MDT
- Referee: Phil Luckett
- TV announcers (NBC): Dick Enberg, Paul Maguire, and Phil Simms

=== Week 3 ===
Team	1	2	3	4	Total
Rams	7	0	0	7	14
• Broncos	7	7	7	14	35

- Date: September 14
- Location: Mile High Stadium
- Game start: 2:00 pm MDT
- TV announcers (FOX): Sam Rosen and Bill Maas

=== Week 4 ===
Team	1	2	3	4	Total
Bengals	7	0	10	3	20
• Broncos	0	14	7	17	38

- Date: September 21
- Location: Mile High Stadium
- Game start: 2:00 pm MDT
- Referee: Mike Carey
- TV announcers (NBC): Charlie Jones and Randy Cross

=== Week 5 ===
Team	1	2	3	4	Total
• Broncos	15	8	6	0	29
Falcons	0	7	7	7	21

- Date: September 28
- Location: Georgia Dome
- Game start: 11:00 am MDT
- Referee: Dick Hantak
- TV announcers (NBC): Charlie Jones and Bob Trumpy

=== Week 6 ===
Team	1	2	3	4	Total
Patriots	0	13	0	0	13
• Broncos	14	0	17	3	34

- Date: October 6
- Location: Mile High Stadium
- Game start: 7:00 pm MDT
- Referee: Jerry Markbreit
- TV announcers (ABC): Al Michaels, Frank Gifford and Dan Dierdorf

=== Week 8 ===
Team	1	2	3	4	Total
Broncos	7	3	7	8	25
• Raiders	7	7	7	7	28

- Date: October 19
- Location: Oakland-Alameda County Coliseum
- Game start: 2:00 pm MDT
- Referee: Bernie Kukar
- TV announcers (NBC): Tom Hammond and Randy Cross

=== Week 9 ===
Team	1	2	3	4	OT	Total
• Broncos	0	10	10	0	3	23
Bills	0	0	20	0	0	20

- Date: October 26
- Location: Rich Stadium
- Game start: 11:00 am MDT
- Referee: Ron Blum
- TV announcers (NBC): Tom Hammond and Randy Cross

=== Week 10 ===
Team	1	2	3	4	Total
Seahawks	3	7	10	7	27
• Broncos	3	10	14	3	30

- Date: November 2
- Location: Mile High Stadium
- Game start: 2:00 pm MST
- Referee: Tom White
- TV announcers (NBC): Tom Hammond and Randy Cross

=== Week 11 ===
Team	1	2	3	4	Total
Panthers	0	0	0	0	0
• Broncos	14	3	10	7	34

- Date: November 9
- Location: Mile High Stadium
- Game start: 2:00 pm MST
- Referee: Johnny Grier
- TV announcers (Fox): Pat Summerall and John Madden

=== Week 12 ===
Team	1	2	3	4	Total
Broncos	3	10	3	6	22
• Chiefs	0	14	7	3	24

- Date: November 16
- Location: Arrowhead Stadium
- Game start: 11:00 am MST
- Referee: Bill Carollo
- TV announcers (NBC): Dick Enberg, Paul Maguire and Phil Simms

=== Week 13 ===
Team	1	2	3	4	Total
Raiders	0	3	0	0	3
• Broncos	0	14	17	0	31

- Date: November 24
- Location: Mile High Stadium
- Game start: 7:00 pm MST
- Referee: Mike Carey
- TV announcers (ABC): Al Michaels, Frank Gifford and Dan Dierdorf

=== Week 14 ===
Team	1	2	3	4	Total
• Broncos	7	21	7	3	38
Chargers	0	7	7	14	28

- Date: November 30
- Location: Qualcomm Stadium
- Game start: 6:00 pm MST
- Referee: Gerald Austin
- TV announcers (ESPN): Mike Patrick and Joe Theismann

=== Week 15 ===
Team	1	2	3	4	Total
Broncos	14	7	3	0	24
• Steelers	7	14	7	7	35

- Date: December 7
- Location: Three Rivers Stadium
- Game start: 11:00 am MST
- Referee: Walt Coleman
- TV announcers (NBC): Dick Enberg, Paul Maguire and Phil Simms

=== Week 16 ===
Team	1	2	3	4	Total
Broncos	10	0	7	0	17
• 49ers	0	14	10	10	34

- Date: December 15
- Location: Candlestick Park
- Game start: 7:00 pm MST
- Referee: Phil Luckett
- TV announcers (ABC): Al Michaels, Frank Gifford and Dan Dierdorf

=== Week 17 ===
Team	1	2	3	4	Total
Chargers	3	0	0	0	3
• Broncos	0	24	7	7	38

- Date: December 21
- Location: Mile High Stadium
- Game start: 2:00 pm MST
- Referee: Jerry Markbreit
- TV announcers (NBC): Mike Breen and James Lofton

== Standings ==
AFC West
	W	L	T	PCT	PF	PA	STK
^{(1)} Kansas City Chiefs	13	3	0	.813	375	232	W6
^{(4)} Denver Broncos	12	4	0	.750	472	287	W1
Seattle Seahawks	8	8	0	.500	365	362	W2
Oakland Raiders	4	12	0	.250	324	419	L5
San Diego Chargers	4	12	0	.250	266	425	L8

== Playoffs ==
Round	Date	Opponent (seed)	Result	Record	Venue	Attendance
Wild Card Playoffs	December 27	Jacksonville Jaguars (5)	W 42–17	1–0	Mile High Stadium	74,481
Divisional	January 4, 1998	at Kansas City Chiefs (1)	W 14–10	2–0	Arrowhead Stadium	76,695
AFC Championship	January 11, 1998	at Pittsburgh Steelers (2)	W 24–21	3–0	Three Rivers Stadium	61,382
Super Bowl XXXII	January 25, 1998	vs. Green Bay Packers (N2)	W 31–24	4–0	Qualcomm Stadium	68,912

=== AFC Wild Card: vs. (5) Jacksonville Jaguars ===
Team	1	2	3	4	Total
Jaguars	0	7	10	0	17
• Broncos	14	7	0	21	42

- Date: December 27
- Location: Mile High Stadium
- Referee: Bernie Kukar
- TV announcers (ABC): Al Michaels, Frank Gifford, and Dan Dierdorf

In the 1997 AFC Wildcard Playoff weekend, the Broncos were paired against the Jacksonville Jaguars. The Broncos viewed this game as a chance to avenge the previous season's Divisional Playoff loss of 30–27 to the Jaguars, an early exit in a year the Broncos were favored to win the Super Bowl. Ultimately, 21 unanswered 4th quarter points saw the Broncos seize the win.

=== AFC Divisional Playoff: at (1) Kansas City Chiefs ===
Team	1	2	3	4	Total
• Broncos	0	7	0	7	14
Chiefs	0	0	10	0	10

- Date: January 4
- Location: Arrowhead Stadium
- Referee: Jerry Markbreit
- TV announcers (NBC): Dick Enberg, Paul Maguire, and Phil Simms

In the Divisional Round, the Broncos faced their AFC West divisional rival, the Kansas City Chiefs, who had won the Division title on the back of a 6-game winning streak to end the regular season. However, while most of that winning streak came with backup QB Rich Gannon at the helm, starting QB Elvis Grbac had reclaimed the reins of the Chiefs' offense by the end of the regular season. The debate as to which QB was best suited to lead the Chiefs' offense entering the playoffs spilled over into this Divisional Round contest, as the Chiefs failed to score in the first half despite home-field advantage. Down by 3 points entering the 4th quarter, the Broncos took the lead back from the Chiefs with Terrell Davis's second touchdown of the game, which would be enough to see them advance to the AFC Championship Game the following week in Pittsburgh.

=== AFC Championship Game: at (2) Pittsburgh Steelers ===
Team	1	2	3	4	Total
• Broncos	7	17	0	0	24
Steelers	7	7	0	7	21

- Date: January 11
- Location: Three Rivers Stadium
- Referee: Ron Blum
- TV announcers (NBC): Dick Enberg, Paul Maguire, and Phil Simms

In the Championship Game, the Broncos once again went on the road to face the Pittsburgh Steelers, who eked out a 7-6 home win over the New England Patriots in their Divisional Round contest the week prior. While the Steelers were slight favorites entering the game, a 17-point 2nd quarter from the Broncos' offense fueled them to a double-digit lead that they never fully relinquished, as they advanced to the Super Bowl for the 5th time in franchise history.

=== Super Bowl: vs. (N2) Green Bay Packers ===
Team	1	2	3	4	Total
Packers	7	7	3	7	24
• Broncos	7	10	7	7	31

- Date: January 25
- Location: Qualcomm Stadium
- Game start: 4:30 pm MST
- Referee: Ed Hochuli
- TV announcers (NBC): Dick Enberg, Phil Simms and Paul Maguire

The Broncos entered Super Bowl XXXII as massive betting underdogs against the Green Bay Packers; Vegas lines saw the Packers close as 11-point favorites just before kickoff. Despite this, the Broncos never trailed in an otherwise tight contest, as their offense managed to score a touchdown in every quarter of the game on the shoulders of RB Terrell Davis, who gave the Broncos the lead for good in the 4th quarter with his 3rd goal-line touchdown of the game. On the day, the Broncos as a team tied the Super Bowl XX winning Chicago Bears' record for most team rushing touchdowns in a single Super Bowl game, with 4. The win marked the Broncos' first-ever Super Bowl in franchise history, having lost in their previous 4 appearances (XII, XXI, XXII, XXIV).

== Awards and records ==
- Terrell Davis, Super Bowl MVP
- John Elway, Franchise Record, Most Touchdowns in One Season, 27 Touchdown Passes
