= Troy Dumas =

American football player and coach (born 1972)

No. 55, 54
- Position: Linebacker

Personal information
- Born: September 30, 1972 (age 54); Riverside, California, U.S.
- Listed height: 6 ft 3 in (1.91 m)
- Listed weight: 242 lb (110 kg)

Career information
- High school: Cheyenne East (Cheyenne, Wyoming)
- College: Nebraska
- NFL draft: 1995: 3rd round, 97th overall pick

Career history

Playing
- Kansas City Chiefs (1995–1997); St. Louis Rams (1997); Denver Broncos (1999)*; Orlando Predators (2000); Las Vegas Outlaws (2001)
- * Offseason or practice squad member only

Coaching
- Cheyenne Central High School Assistant coach / Linebackers and defensive ends; Doane College Defensive coordinator / Linebackers; Southeast Missouri (2008-2009) Linebackers; Southeast Missouri (2010) Safeties

Awards and highlights
- ArenaBowl champion (2000); National champion (1994); First-team All-Big Eight (1994)

Career NFL statistics
- GP / GS: 16 / 0
- Sacks: 1
- FF / FR: 1 / 0
- Stats at Pro Football Reference
- Stats at ArenaFan.com

Troy T. Dumas (born September 30, 1972) is an American former professional football player who was a linebacker in the National Football League (NFL). He played college football for the Nebraska Cornhuskers. He was drafted in the third round (97th overall) by the Kansas City Chiefs.

He also played for the St. Louis Rams of the National Football League (NFL) as well as the Las Vegas Outlaws of the XFL. He became a coach after his playing career.

== College career ==
Dumas attended the University of Nebraska–Lincoln where he was a member of four consecutive Big Eight Conference championship teams. Four teams that also competed in the FedEx Orange Bowl (1991-1994). He played defensive back for his first three seasons before converting to linebacker as senior in 1994. Following his senior season, he was a First-team All-Conference selection and was a semi-finalist for the Butkus Award. He graduated from Nebraska with a Bachelor's degree in Human resources and family sciences.

== Professional career ==
Dumas was selected in the third round (97th overall) of the 1995 NFL draft by the Kansas City Chiefs. He ended up missing his entire rookie season after injuring his knee in the second preseason game, against the Arizona Cardinals. In 1996, he appeared in six games, at both linebacker and on special teams. In 1997, appeared mostly on special teams, it was during this season he recorded his only career sack. Midway through the season, he joined the St. Louis Rams, appearing in two games for them. On July 8, 1998, he was released by the Rams. On January 5, 1999, he signed with the Denver Broncos. However, he was released on August 26, 1999.

In 2000, he joined the Orlando Predators, as a fullback / linebacker, of the Arena Football League. While there, he recorded five tackles, and two carries for four yards. In 2001, he joined the Las Vegas Outlaws of the XFL for its lone season.

== Coaching career ==
Dumas began his coaching career as an assistant coach at Cheyenne Central High School. He then became the defensive coordinator, linebacker and defensive ends coach at Doane College.

In early 2008, he joined the coaching staff at Southeast Missouri State as the teams linebackers coach. That same year, he also earned an NFL Minority Coaching Fellowship with the Kansas City Chiefs.
