= 1997 St. Louis Rams season =

NFL team season

- Owner: Georgia Frontiere
- General manager: Dick Vermeil
- Head coach: Dick Vermeil
- Offensive coordinator: Jerry Rhome
- Defensive coordinator: Bud Carson
- Home stadium: Trans World Dome

Results
- Record: 5–11
- Division place: 5th NFC West
- Playoffs: Did not qualify
- Pro Bowlers: DE Kevin Carter

Uniform
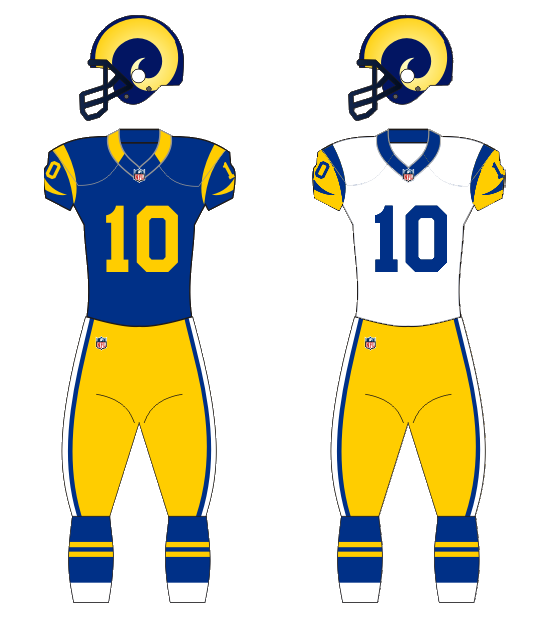

The 1997 St. Louis Rams season was the team's 60th year with the National Football League (NFL) and the third season in St. Louis. Still struggling to find answers, the Rams looked to improve on their 6–10 record from 1996 and make the playoffs for the first time since 1989, when the team was still based in Anaheim. The Rams started out the season mediocre, splitting their first four games. However, after beating the New York Giants at home, things began to unravel, as the Rams lost their next eight games before winning three of their last four to end the season 5–11. This was Dick Vermeil’s first season as head coach of the Rams. Despite the losing record, Vermeil had brought the Rams back to competitiveness. Of their 5–11 record, five of those losses were only by a touchdown or less.

== Offseason ==
=== NFL draft ===
1997 St. Louis Rams draft
Round	Pick	Player	Position	College	Notes
1	1	Orlando Pace * ^{†}	Offensive tackle	Ohio State	
2	40	Dexter McCleon	Cornerback	Clemson	
4	112	Ryan Tucker	Offensive tackle	TCU	
Made roster † Pro Football Hall of Fame * Made at least one Pro Bowl during career

== Roster ==
1997 St. Louis Rams roster
Quarterbacks (QB): 12 Tony Banks; 9 Will Furrer; 11 Mark Rypien; Running backs (RB): 33 Derrick Harris; 34 Craig Heyward FB; 31 Amp Lee; 44 Jerald Moore; 28 David Thompson; Wide receivers (WR): 80 Isaac Bruce; 81 Keith Crawford; 88 Eddie Kennison; 16 Donald Sellers; 83 Torrance Small; 87 J. T. Thomas; Tight ends (TE): 84 Ernie Conwell; 89 Mitch Jacoby; 86 Aaron Laing	Offensive linemen (OL): 77 Ethan Brooks T; 65 Ernest Dye T; 70 Wayne Gandy T; 66 John Gerak G; 60 Mike Gruttadauria C; 73 Fred Miller T; 76 Orlando Pace T; 62 Vernice Smith C; 50 Ryan Tucker C; 72 Zach Wiegert G; Defensive linemen (DL): 93 Kevin Carter DE; 75 D'Marco Farr DT; 79 Bill Johnson DT; 98 Chris Maumalanga DT; 91 Leslie O'Neal DE; 92 Bryan Robinson DT; 94 Jeff Robinson DE; 96 Jay Williams DE	Linebackers (LB): 54 Troy Dumas OLB; 57 Britt Hager MLB; 52 Mike Jones OLB; 55 Robert Jones MLB; 59 Muadianvita Kazadi OLB; 58 Roman Phifer OLB; 53 Brett Wallerstedt MLB; Defensive backs (DB): 20 Taje Allen CB; 22 Billy Jenkins SS; 41 Todd Lyght CB; 35 Keith Lyle FS; 24 Dexter McCleon CB; 47 Ryan McNeil CB; 42 Joe Rowe CB; 37 Mike Scurlock FS; 32 Toby Wright SS; Special teams (ST): 2 Mike Horan P; 14 Jeff Wilkins K	Practice squad: 15 Donnell Baker WR; 95 Shannon Brown DT; 26 June Henley RB; -- David Kempfert C; Reserve: 56 Charlie Clemons LB (IR); 82 Malcolm Floyd WR (IR); 23 Gerald McBurrows S (IR); -- Billy Milner T (IR); 51 Lorenzo Styles LB (IR); 90 Jeff Zgonina DT (IR); 53 active, 6 inactive, 4 practice squad Rookies in italics

== Regular season ==
=== Schedule ===
Week	Date	Opponent	Result	Record	Venue	Attendance
1	August 31	**New Orleans Saints**	**W** 38–24	1–0	Trans World Dome	64,575
2	September 7	**San Francisco 49ers**	**L** 12–15	1–1	Trans World Dome	64,630
3	September 14	at Denver Broncos	**L** 14–35	1–2	Mile High Stadium	74,338
4	September 21	New York Giants	**W** 13–3	2–2	Trans World Dome	64,642
5	September 28	at Oakland Raiders	**L** 17–35	2–3	Oakland–Alameda County Coliseum	42,506
6	Bye					
7	October 12	at **San Francisco 49ers**	**L** 10–30	2–4	3Com Park	63,825
8	October 19	Seattle Seahawks	**L** 9–17	2–5	Trans World Dome	64,819
9	October 26	Kansas City Chiefs	**L** 20–28	2–6	Trans World Dome	64,864
10	November 2	at **Atlanta Falcons**	**L** 31–34	2–7	Georgia Dome	36,583
11	November 9	at Green Bay Packers	**L** 7–17	2–8	Lambeau Field	60,093
12	November 16	**Atlanta Falcons**	**L** 21–27	2–9	Trans World Dome	64,299
13	November 23	**Carolina Panthers**	**L** 10–16	2–10	Trans World Dome	64,609
14	November 30	at Washington Redskins	**W** 23–20	3–10	Jack Kent Cooke Stadium	74,772
15	December 7	at **New Orleans Saints**	**W** 34–27	4–10	Louisiana Superdome	54,803
16	December 14	Chicago Bears	**L** 10–13	4–11	Trans World Dome	66,030
17	December 20	at **Carolina Panthers**	**W** 30–18	5–11	Ericcson Stadium	58,101
Note: Intra-division opponents are in **bold** text.

=== Standings ===
NFC West
	W	L	T	PCT	PF	PA	STK
^{(1)} San Francisco 49ers	13	3	0	.813	375	265	L1
Carolina Panthers	7	9	0	.438	265	314	L2
Atlanta Falcons	7	9	0	.438	320	361	L1
New Orleans Saints	6	10	0	.375	237	327	L1
St. Louis Rams	5	11	0	.313	299	359	W1
