= 1997 Kansas City Chiefs season =

NFL team season

- Owner: Lamar Hunt
- General manager: Carl Peterson
- Head coach: Marty Schottenheimer
- Offensive coordinator: Paul Hackett
- Defensive coordinator: Gunther Cunningham
- Home stadium: Arrowhead Stadium

Results
- Record: 13–3
- Division place: 1st AFC West
- Playoffs: Lost Divisional Playoffs (vs. Broncos) 10–14
- All-Pros: 3: G Dave Szott (1st team); G Will Shields (2nd team); CB James Hasty (2nd team)
- Pro Bowlers: 6: FB Kimble Anders; WR Andre Rison; G Will Shields; LB Derrick Thomas; CB Dale Carter; CB James Hasty

The 1997 season was the Kansas City Chiefs' 28th in the National Football League (NFL) and their 38th overall. The Chiefs improved on their 9–7 record from 1996, and finished with a 13–3 record and as AFC West division champions. The Rich Gannon–Elvis Grbac quarterback controversy was a focal point of the team's season. It brewed throughout the entire season and arguably cost the Chiefs a victory in the playoffs. The Chiefs were defeated by division rival and eventual Super Bowl champion, Denver Broncos, in the 1997 playoffs. 1997 was the final season the Chiefs appeared in the playoffs during the 1990s and for the next several seasons, they fell into futility. They did not return to the playoffs until 2003.

This was the last season that head coach Marty Schottenheimer would coach the team into the playoffs, with the loss to Denver in the divisional round 14–10 capping off many years of disappointing playoff struggles. This was also the final season for future Hall of Fame running back Marcus Allen.

== Offseason ==
=== NFL draft ===
1997 Kansas City Chiefs draft
Round	Pick	Player	Position	College	Notes
1	13	Tony Gonzalez * ^{†}	Tight end	California	
2	47	Kevin Lockett	Wide receiver	Kansas State	
4	110	Pat Barnes	Quarterback	California	
6	163	June Henley	Running back	Kansas	
6	195	Isaac Byrd	Wide receiver	Kansas	
7	214	Nathan Parks	Offensive tackle	Stanford	
Made roster † Pro Football Hall of Fame * Made at least one Pro Bowl during career

== Personnel ==
=== Staff ===
1997 Kansas City Chiefs staff
Front office: Founder – Lamar Hunt; Chairman of the Board – Jack Steadman; President/General Manager/Chief Executive Officer – Carl Peterson; Executive Vice President/Assistant General Manager – Dennis Thum; Administrative Assistant to the Head Coach – Russ Ball; Head coaches: Head Coach – Marty Schottenheimer; Assistant Head Coach/Wide Receivers – Al Saunders; Offensive coaches: Offensive Coordinator – Paul Hackett; Quarterbacks – Mike McCarthy; Running Backs – Jimmy Raye; Tight Ends/Offensive Assistant – Jim Erkenbeck; Offensive Line – Mike Solari	Defensive coaches: Defensive Coordinator/Linebackers – Gunther Cunningham; Defensive Line – Bob Karmelowicz; Defensive Backs – Kurt Schottenheimer; Defensive Assistant/Special Teams – Woodrow Lowe; Defensive Assistant/Quality Control – Darvin Wallis; Special teams coaches: Special Teams – Mike Stock; Strength and conditioning: Strength and Conditioning – Dave Redding; Strength and Conditioning – Matt Schiotz; Assistant Strength and Conditioning – Roberto Parker

=== Roster ===
1997 Kansas City Chiefs roster
Quarterbacks (QB): 17 Pat Barnes; 12 Rich Gannon; 11 Elvis Grbac; 8 Billy Joe Tolliver; Running backs (RB): 32 Marcus Allen; 38 Kimble Anders FB; 30 Donnell Bennett FB; 27 Greg Hill; 49 Tony Richardson FB; Wide receivers (WR): 80 Lake Dawson; 84 Joe Horn; 83 Danan Hughes; 81 Kevin Lockett; 89 Andre Rison; 87 Tamarick Vanover; Tight ends (TE): 88 Tony Gonzalez; 48 Ted Popson; 82 Derrick Walker	Offensive linemen (OL): 69 Jeff Criswell T; 61 Tim Grunhard C; 62 Glenn Parker T; 72 Nate Parks G/T; 68 Will Shields G; 65 Jeff Smith C; 79 Dave Szott G; 70 Marcus Spears T; 64 Ralph Tamm; 70 Steve Wallace T; Defensive linemen (DL): 71 Tom Barndt NT; 99 Vaughn Booker DE; 93 John Browning DE; 77 Pellom McDaniels DE; 91 Ty Parten DT; 95 Michael Dean Perry DT; 75 Joe Phillips NT; 92 Dan Williams DT	Linebackers (LB): 50 Anthony Davis OLB; 59 Donnie Edwards MLB; 51 Greg Manusky ILB; 54 Tracy Simien MLB; 56 Wayne Simmons OLB; 58 Derrick Thomas OLB; 90 Terry Wooden ILB; Defensive backs (DB): 44 Darren Anderson CB; 45 Bucky Brooks CB; 34 Dale Carter CB; 40 James Hasty CB; 29 Mark McMillian CB; 47 Todd Scott S; 25 Reggie Tongue SS; 21 Jerome Woods FS; Special teams (ST): 5 Louie Aguiar P; 10 Pete Stoyanovich K	Practice squad: -- Kotto Cotton WR; 42 Jesse Haynes RB; 53 Mark Smith LB; 73 Pete Swanson T; 24 Vann Washington S; Reserve: 9 Reggie Jones WR (IR); 31 Kevin Ross CB/S (IR); 53 active, 2 inactive, 5 practice squad Rookies in italics

== Preseason ==
Week	Date	Opponent	Result	Record	Venue	Attendance	Recap
1	August 2	Pittsburgh Steelers	L 14–28	0–1	Arrowhead Stadium	72,726	Recap
2	August 9	at New Orleans Saints	L 7–26	0–2	Louisiana Superdome	55,211	Recap
3	August 14	Carolina Panthers	W 30–10	1–2	Arrowhead Stadium	76,972	Recap
4	August 22	at St. Louis Rams	L 13–14	1–3	Trans World Dome	63,936	Recap

== Regular season ==
=== Schedule ===
Week	Date	Opponent	Result	Record	Venue	Attendance	Recap
1	August 31	at **Denver Broncos**	**L** 3–19	0–1	Mile High Stadium	75,600	Recap
2	September 8	at **Oakland Raiders**	**W** 28–27	1–1	Oakland–Alameda County Coliseum	61,523	Recap
3	September 14	Buffalo Bills	**W** 22–16	2–1	Arrowhead Stadium	78,169	Recap
4	September 21	at Carolina Panthers	**W** 35–14	3–1	Ericsson Stadium	67,402	Recap
5	September 28	**Seattle Seahawks**	**W** 20–17 (OT)	4–1	Arrowhead Stadium	77,877	Recap
6	October 5	at Miami Dolphins	**L** 14–17	4–2	Pro Player Stadium	71,794	Recap
7	Bye						
8	October 16	**San Diego Chargers**	**W** 31–3	5–2	Arrowhead Stadium	77,196	Recap
9	October 26	at St. Louis Rams	**W** 28–20	6–2	Trans World Dome	64,864	Recap
10	November 3	Pittsburgh Steelers	**W** 13–10	7–2	Arrowhead Stadium	78,301	Recap
11	November 9	at Jacksonville Jaguars	**L** 10–24	7–3	Alltel Stadium	70,444	Recap
12	November 16	**Denver Broncos**	**W** 24–22	8–3	Arrowhead Stadium	77,963	Recap
13	November 23	at **Seattle Seahawks**	**W** 19–14	9–3	Kingdome	66,264	Recap
14	November 30	San Francisco 49ers	**W** 44–9	10–3	Arrowhead Stadium	77,535	Recap
15	December 7	**Oakland Raiders**	**W** 30–0	11–3	Arrowhead Stadium	76,379	Recap
16	December 14	at **San Diego Chargers**	**W** 29–7	12–3	Qualcomm Stadium	54,594	Recap
17	December 21	New Orleans Saints	**W** 25–13	13–3	Arrowhead Stadium	66,772	Recap
Note: Intra-division opponents are in **bold** text.

=== Game summaries ===
==== Week 1: at Denver Broncos ====
Week 1: Kansas City Chiefs at Denver Broncos – Game summary

Quarter	1	2	3	4	Total
Chiefs	0	0	3	0	**3**
**Broncos**	3	6	0	10	**19**

at Mile High Stadium, Denver, Colorado

- Date: August 31
- Game time: 3:00 p.m. CDT/2:00 p.m. MDT
- Game weather: Partly cloudy, 82 °F (28 °C)
- Game attendance: 75,600
- Referee: Ed Hochuli
- TV announcers (NBC): Dick Enberg, Paul Maguire, Phil Simms and Jim Gray
- Recap, Game Book

Game information

**First quarter**

- DEN – Jason Elam 35-yard field goal, 4:30. Broncos 3–0. **Drive: 14 plays, 48 yards, 6:12.**

**Second quarter**

- DEN – Jason Elam 36-yard field goal, 6:09. Broncos 6–0. **Drive: 16 plays, 77 yards, 8:38.**
- DEN – Jason Elam 25-yard field goal, 0:13. Broncos 9–0. **Drive: 8 plays, 83 yards, 1:39.**

**Third quarter**

- KC – Pete Stoyanovich 20-yard field goal, 1:24. Broncos 9–3. **Drive: 11 plays, 77 yards, 6:04.**

**Fourth quarter**

- DEN – Terrell Davis 10-yard run (Jason Elam kick), 12:55. Broncos 16–3. **Drive: 6 plays, 49 yards, 3:29.**
- DEN – Jason Elam 53-yard field goal, 3:44. Broncos 19–3. **Drive: 10 plays, 55 yards, 5:31.**

**Top passers**

- KC – Elvis Grbac – 14/25, 115 yards, INT
- DEN – John Elway – 17/28, 246 yards

**Top rushers**

- KC – Greg Hill – 7 rushes, 92 yards
- DEN – Terrell Davis – 26 rushes, 101 yards, TD

**Top receivers**

- KC – Lake Dawson – 2 receptions, 30 yards
- DEN – Rod Smith – 5 receptions, 122 yards

==== Week 2: at Oakland Raiders ====
Week 2: Kansas City Chiefs at Oakland Raiders – Game summary

Quarter	1	2	3	4	Total
**Chiefs**	3	10	9	6	**28**
Raiders	7	3	17	0	**27**

at Oakland–Alameda County Coliseum, Oakland, California

- Date: September 8
- Game time: 8:00 p.m. CDT/6:00 p.m. PDT
- Game weather: Partly cloudy, 74 °F (23 °C)
- Game attendance: 61,523
- Referee: Gary Lane
- TV announcers (ABC): Al Michaels, Frank Gifford, Dan Dierdorf and Lynn Swann
- Recap, Game Book

Game information

**First quarter**

- OAK – Napoleon Kaufman 10-yard run (Cole Ford kick), 6:45. Raiders 7–0. **Drive: 9 plays, 81 yards, 4:50.**
- KC – Pete Stoyanovich 23-yard field goal, 2:14. Raiders 7–3. **Drive: 9 plays, 69 yards, 4:31.**

**Second quarter**

- KC – Kimble Anders 5-yard pass from Elvis Grbac (Pete Stoyanovich kick), 8:42. Chiefs 10–7. **Drive: 6 plays, 44 yards, 2:59.**
- OAK – Cole Ford 32-yard field goal, 1:03. Tied 10–10. **Drive: 12 plays, 77 yards, 2:49.**
- KC – Pete Stoyanovich 24-yard field goal, 0:02. Chiefs 13–10. **Drive: 6 plays, 83 yards, 1:01.**

**Third quarter**

- OAK – Rickey Dudley 37-yard pass from Jeff George (Cole Ford kick), 13:03. Raiders 17–13. **Drive: 3 plays, 76 yards, 1:57.**
- OAK – Rickey Dudley 16-yard pass from Jeff George (Cole Ford kick), 10:23. Raiders 24–13. **Drive: 3 plays, 54 yards, 0:42.**
- OAK – Cole Ford 34-yard field goal, 9:50. Raiders 27–13. **Drive: 4 plays, 0 yards, 0:22.**
- KC – Pete Stoyanovich 23-yard field goal, 5:26. Raiders 27–16. **Drive: 8 plays, 61 yards, 4:24.**
- KC – Darren Anderson 55-yard interception return (pass failed), 1:05. Raiders 27–22.

**Fourth quarter**

- KC – Andre Rison 32-yard pass from Elvis Grbac (pass failed), 0:03. Chiefs 28–27. **Drive: 6 plays, 80 yards, 0:55.**

**Top passers**

- KC – Elvis Grbac – 21/35, 212 yards, 2 TD
- OAK – Jeff George – 19/39, 295 yards, 2 TD, 2 INT

**Top rushers**

- KC – Kimble Anders – 5 rushes, 55 yards
- OAK – Napoleon Kaufman – 22 rushes, 84 yards, TD

**Top receivers**

- KC – Andre Rison – 8 receptions, 162 yards, TD
- OAK – Tim Brown – 11 receptions, 155 yards

==== Week 3: vs. Buffalo Bills ====
Week 3: Buffalo Bills at Kansas City Chiefs – Game summary

Quarter	1	2	3	4	Total
Bills	0	3	7	6	**16**
**Chiefs**	6	3	0	13	**22**

at Arrowhead Stadium, Kansas City, Missouri

- Date: September 14
- Game time: 12:00 p.m. CDT
- Game weather: Clear, 77 °F (25 °C)
- Game attendance: 78,169
- Referee: Tom White
- TV announcers (NBC): Mike Breen and James Lofton
- Recap, Game Book

Game information

**First quarter**

- KC – Pete Stoyanovich 46-yard field goal, 8:20. Chiefs 3–0. **Drive: 11 plays, 54 yards, 5:03.**
- KC – Pete Stoyanovich 45-yard field goal, 1:08. Chiefs 6–0. **Drive: 6 plays, 30 yards, 2:38.**

**Second quarter**

- BUF – Steve Christie 46-yard field goal, 7:49. Chiefs 6–3. **Drive: 9 plays, 32 yards, 3:30.**
- KC – Pete Stoyanovich 42-yard field goal, 1:03. Chiefs 9–3. **Drive: 9 plays, 47 yards, 1:07.**

**Third quarter**

- BUF – Andre Reed 77-yard pass from Todd Collins (Steve Christie kick), 12:15. Bills 10–9. **Drive: 2 plays, 86 yards, 0:48.**

**Fourth quarter**

- BUF – Steve Christie 33-yard field goal, 14:29. Bills 13–9. **Drive: 6 plays, 57 yards, 1:42.**
- KC – Tamarick Vanover 94-yard kickoff return (Pete Stoyanovich kick), 14:13. Chiefs 16–13.
- BUF – Steve Christie 30-yard field goal, 11:52. Tied 16–16. **Drive: 5 plays, 49 yards, 2:21.**
- KC – Tony Richardson 1-yard pass from Elvis Grbac (kick blocked), 6:55. Chiefs 22–16. **Drive: 6 plays, 50 yards, 2:55.**

**Top passers**

- BUF – Todd Collins – 22/43, 297 yards, TD, 2 INT
- KC – Elvis Grbac – 20/37, 179 yards, TD

**Top rushers**

- BUF – Antowain Smith – 11 rushes, 30 yards
- KC – Greg Hill – 17 rushes, 59 yards

**Top receivers**

- BUF – Andre Reed – 4 receptions, 113 yards, TD
- KC – Andre Rison – 5 receptions, 75 yards

==== Week 4: at Carolina Panthers ====
Week 4: Kansas City Chiefs at Carolina Panthers – Game summary

Quarter	1	2	3	4	Total
**Chiefs**	7	7	7	14	**35**
Panthers	0	7	0	7	**14**

at Ericsson Stadium, Charlotte, North Carolina

- Date: September 21
- Game time: 1:00 p.m. EDT/12:00 p.m. CDT
- Game weather: Cloudy, 71 °F (22 °C)
- Game attendance: 67,402
- Referee: Dale Hamer
- TV announcers (NBC): Dan Hicks and Jim Mora
- Recap, Game Book

Game information

**First quarter**

- KC – Kimble Anders 55-yard pass from Elvis Grbac (Pete Stoyanovich kick), 0:38. Chiefs 7–0. **Drive: 3 plays, 58 yards, 1:38.**

**Second quarter**

- KC – Andre Rison 18-yard pass from Elvis Grbac (Pete Stoyanovich kick), 9:32. Chiefs 14–0. **Drive: 5 plays, 56 yards, 1:30.**
- CAR – Fred Lane 8-yard run (John Kasay kick), 3:59. Chiefs 14–7. **Drive: 5 plays, 49 yards, 2:17.**

**Third quarter**

- KC – Marcus Allen 1-yard run (Pete Stoyanovich kick), 6:32. Chiefs 21–7. **Drive: 4 plays, 14 yards, 1:21.**

**Fourth quarter**

- KC – Tony Richardson 3-yard pass from Elvis Grbac (Pete Stoyanovich kick), 14:19. Chiefs 28–7. **Drive: 4 plays, 30 yards, 1:42.**
- KC – Mark McMillian 62-yard interception return (Pete Stoyanovich kick), 13:42. Chiefs 35–7.
- CAR – Wesley Walls 19-yard pass from Kerry Collins (John Kasay kick), 5:46. Chiefs 35–14. **Drive: 7 plays, 70 yards, 1:53.**

**Top passers**

- KC – Elvis Grbac – 16/29, 224 yards, 3 TD, INT
- CAR – Kerry Collins – 24/47, 328 yards, TD, 4 INT

**Top rushers**

- KC – Kimble Anders – 7 rushes, 42 yards
- CAR – Anthony Johnson – 11 rushes, 39 yards

**Top receivers**

- KC – Kimble Anders – 4 receptions, 94 yards, TD
- CAR – Rae Carruth – 8 receptions, 110 yards,

==== Week 5: vs. Seattle Seahawks ====
Week 5: Seattle Seahawks at Kansas City Chiefs – Game summary

Quarter	1	2	3	4	OT	Total
Seahawks	7	3	7	0	0	**17**
**Chiefs**	0	7	7	3	3	**20**

at Arrowhead Stadium, Kansas City, Missouri

- Date: September 28
- Game time: 3:00 p.m. CDT
- Game weather: Clear, 79 °F (26 °C)
- Game attendance: 77,877
- Referee: Walt Coleman
- TV announcers (NBC): Don Criqui and Jim Mora
- Recap, Game Book

Game information

**First quarter**

- SEA – Joey Galloway 41-yard pass from Warren Moon (Todd Peterson kick), 8:33. Seahawks 7–0. **Drive: 3 plays, 53 yards, 1:18.**

**Second quarter**

- SEA – Todd Peterson 44-yard field goal, 9:34. Seahawks 10–0. **Drive: 14 plays, 61 yards, 8:26.**
- KC – Marcus Allen 8-yard run (Pete Stoyanovich kick), 5:11. Seahawks 10–7. **Drive: 8 plays, 77 yards, 4:23.**

**Third quarter**

- KC – Marcus Allen 1-yard run (Pete Stoyanovich kick), 7:03. Chiefs 14–10. **Drive: 11 plays, 79 yards, 6:09.**
- SEA – James McKnight 54-yard pass from Warren Moon (Todd Peterson kick), 5:24. Seahawks 17–14. **Drive: 3 plays, 78 yards, 1:29.**

**Fourth quarter**

- KC – Pete Stoyanovich 29-yard field goal, 13:14. Tied 17–17. **Drive: 13 plays, 58 yards, 7:10.**

**Overtime**

- KC – Pete Stoyanovich 41-yard field goal, 1:56. Chiefs 20–17. **Drive: 9 plays, 27 yards, 4:33.**

**Top passers**

- SEA – Warren Moon – 19/26, 252 yards, 2 TD, INT
- KC – Elvis Grbac – 24/38, 274 yards, 3 INT

**Top rushers**

- SEA – Lamar Smith – 12 rushes, 78 yards
- KC – Marcus Allen – 19 rushes, 78 yards, 2 TD

**Top receivers**

- SEA – Mike Pritchard – 4 receptions, 88 yards
- KC – Andre Rison – 7 receptions, 78 yards

==== Week 6: at Miami Dolphins ====
Week 6: Kansas City Chiefs at Miami Dolphins – Game summary

Quarter	1	2	3	4	Total
Chiefs	0	14	0	0	**14**
**Dolphins**	7	7	0	3	**17**

at Pro Player Stadium, Miami, Florida

- Date: October 5
- Game time: 1:00 p.m. EDT/12:00 p.m. CDT
- Game weather: 84 °F (29 °C)
- Game attendance: 71,794
- Referee: Johnny Grier
- TV announcers (NBC): Charlie Jones, Bob Trumpy and Randy Cross
- Recap, Game Book

Game information

**First quarter**

- MIA – Karim Abdul-Jabbar 10-yard run (Olindo Mare kick), 5:35. Dolphins 7–0. **Drive: 4 plays, 44 yards, 2:21.**

**Second quarter**

- KC – Andre Rison 18-yard pass from Elvis Grbac (Pete Stoyanovich kick), 10:54. Tied 7–7. **Drive: 12 plays, 65 yards, 6:09.**
- KC – Tony Gonzalez 21-yard pass from Elvis Grbac (Pete Stoyanovich kick), 5:40. Chiefs 14–7. **Drive: 6 plays, 54 yards, 3:04.**
- MIA – Bernie Parmalee 7-yard pass from Dan Marino (Olindo Mare kick), 1:11. Tied 14–14. **Drive: 9 plays, 95 yards, 4:29.**

**Third quarter**

- No scoring plays.

**Fourth quarter**

- MIA – Olindo Mare 29-yard field goal, 5:40. Dolphins 17–14. **Drive: 11 plays, 60 yards, 4:34.**

**Top passers**

- KC – Elvis Grbac – 23/30, 177 yards, 2 TD
- MIA – Dan Marino – 19/31, 259 yards, TD

**Top rushers**

- KC – Marcus Allen – 7 rushes, 25 yards
- MIA – Karim Abdul-Jabbar – 17 rushes, 38 yards, TD

**Top receivers**

- KC – Andre Rison – 8 receptions, 86 yards, TD
- MIA – O. J. McDuffie – 5 receptions, 86 yards

==== Week 8: vs. San Diego Chargers ====
Week 8: San Diego Chargers at Kansas City Chiefs – Game summary

Quarter	1	2	3	4	Total
Chargers	0	0	3	0	**3**
**Chiefs**	7	17	0	7	**31**

at Arrowhead Stadium, Kansas City, Missouri

- Date: October 16
- Game time: 7:00 p.m. CDT
- Game weather: Clear, 61 °F (16 °C)
- Game attendance: 77,196
- Referee: Dick Hantak
- TV announcers (TNT): Verne Lundquist, Pat Haden, Mark May and Craig Sager
- Recap, Game Book

Game information

**First quarter**

- KC – Elvis Grbac 1-yard run (Pete Stoyanovich kick), 3:17. Chiefs 7–0. **Drive: 6 plays, 62 yards, 2:47.**

**Second quarter**

- KC – Andre Rison 10-yard pass from Elvis Grbac (Pete Stoyanovich kick), 6:50. Chiefs 14–0. **Drive: 7 plays, 54 yards, 3:49.**
- KC – Andre Rison 5-yard pass from Elvis Grbac (Pete Stoyanovich kick), 2:21. Chiefs 21–0. **Drive: 6 plays, 36 yards, 2:21.**
- KC – Pete Stoyanovich 45-yard field goal, 0:02. Chiefs 24–0. **Drive: 7 plays, 32 yards, 0:41.**

**Third quarter**

- SD – Greg Davis 26-yard field goal, 0:37. Chiefs 24–3. **Drive: 14 plays, 61 yards, 7:06.**

**Fourth quarter**

- KC – Marcus Allen 6-yard run (Pete Stoyanovich kick), 10:34. Chiefs 31–3. **Drive: 6 plays, 29 yards, 3:32.**

**Top passers**

- SD – Jim Everett – 9/25, 137 yards, 2 INT
- KC – Elvis Grbac – 20/40, 235 yards, 2 TD

**Top rushers**

- SD – Gary Brown – 12 rushes, 59 yards
- KC – Marcus Allen – 7 rushes, 29 yards, TD

**Top receivers**

- SD – Freddie Jones – 4 receptions, 81 yards
- KC – Andre Rison – 8 receptions, 86 yards, 2 TD

==== Week 9: at St. Louis Rams ====
Week 9: Kansas City Chiefs at St. Louis Rams – Game summary

Quarter	1	2	3	4	Total
**Chiefs**	6	11	11	0	**28**
Rams	7	7	0	6	**20**

at Trans World Dome, St. Louis, Missouri

- Date: October 26
- Game time: 12:00 p.m. CST
- Game weather: None (indoor stadium)
- Game attendance: 64,864
- Referee: Bob McElwee
- TV announcers (NBC): Joel Meyers and Beasley Reece
- Recap, Game Book

Game information

**First quarter**

- KC – Pete Stoyanovich 25-yard field goal, 12:35. Chiefs 3–0. **Drive: 4 plays, 24 yards, 1:24.**
- STL – Isaac Bruce 12-yard pass from Tony Banks (Jeff Wilkins kick), 4:59. Rams 7–3. **Drive: 9 plays, 79 yards, 4:48.**
- KC – Pete Stoyanovich 52-yard field goal, 0:54. Rams 7–6. **Drive: 10 plays, 42 yards, 4:05.**

**Second quarter**

- KC – Lake Dawson 10-yard pass from Elvis Grbac (Elvis Grbac–Tamarick Vanover pass), 10:40. Chiefs 14–7. **Drive: 9 plays, 65 yards, 3:33.**
- KC – Pete Stoyanovich 41-yard field goal, 5:57. Chiefs 17–7. **Drive: 4 plays, 0 yards, 1:53.**
- STL – Lawrence Phillips 1-yard run (Jeff Wilkins kick), 1:48. Chiefs 17–14. **Drive: 8 plays, 70 yards, 4:09.**

**Third quarter**

- KC – Pete Stoyanovich 39-yard field goal, 10:09. Chiefs 20–14. **Drive: 10 plays, 60 yards, 4:51.**
- KC – Marcus Allen 2-yard run (Elvis Grbac–Tony Gonzalez pass), 7:01. Chiefs 28–14. **Drive: 4 plays, 22 yards, 2:07.**

**Fourth quarter**

- STL – Jeff Wilkins 25-yard field goal, 11:12. Chiefs 28–17. **Drive: 12 plays, 40 yards, 5:31.**
- STL – Jeff Wilkins 49-yard field goal, 5:07. Chiefs 28–20. **Drive: 6 plays, 52 yards, 1:12.**

**Top passers**

- KC – Elvis Grbac – 20/37, 204 yards, TD
- STL – Tony Banks – 18/30, 268 yards, TD

**Top rushers**

- KC – Donnell Bennett – 8 rushes, 32 yards
- STL – Lawrence Phillips – 23 rushes, 67 yards, TD

**Top receivers**

- KC – Tony Gonzalez – 4 receptions, 53 yards
- STL – Isaac Bruce – 5 receptions, 94 yards, TD

==== Week 10: vs. Pittsburgh Steelers ====
Week 10: Pittsburgh Steelers at Kansas City Chiefs – Game summary

Quarter	1	2	3	4	Total
Steelers	10	0	0	0	**10**
**Chiefs**	0	13	0	0	**13**

at Arrowhead Stadium, Kansas City, Missouri

- Date: November 3
- Game time: 8:00 p.m. CST
- Game weather: Partly cloudy, 37 °F (3 °C)
- Game attendance: 78,301
- Referee: Ed Hochuli
- TV announcers (ABC): Al Michaels, Frank Gifford, Dan Dierdorf and Lynn Swann
- Recap, Game Book

Game information

**First quarter**

- PIT – Courtney Hawkins 44-yard pass from Kordell Stewart (Norm Johnson kick), 8:05. Steelers 7–0. **Drive: 7 plays, 79 yards, 3:43.**
- PIT – Norm Johnson 27-yard field goal, 0:32. Steelers 10–0. **Drive: 9 plays, 38 yards, 3:25.**

**Second quarter**

- KC – Pete Stoyanovich 35-yard field goal, 9:13. Steelers 10–3. **Drive: 12 plays, 60 yards, 6:19.**
- KC – Pete Stoyanovich 44-yard field goal, 2:54. Steelers 10–6. **Drive: 11 plays, 38 yards, 4:23.**
- KC – Danan Hughes 14-yard pass from Marcus Allen (Pete Stoyanovich kick), 1:40. Chiefs 13–10. **Drive: 5 plays, 45 yards, 0:55.**

**Third quarter**

- No scoring plays.

**Fourth quarter**

- No scoring plays.

**Top passers**

- PIT – Kordell Stewart – 11/21, 101 yards, TD, INT
- KC – Elvis Grbac – 16/29, 172 yards, INT

**Top rushers**

- PIT – Jerome Bettis – 17 rushes, 103 yards
- KC – Marcus Allen – 10 rushes, 49 yards

**Top receivers**

- PIT – Courtney Hawkins – 5 receptions, 76 yards, TD
- KC – Tony Gonzalez – 4 receptions, 56 yards

==== Week 11: at Jacksonville Jaguars ====
Week 11: Kansas City Chiefs at Jacksonville Jaguars – Game summary

Quarter	1	2	3	4	Total
Chiefs	0	3	0	7	**10**
**Jaguars**	7	17	0	0	**24**

at Alltel Stadium, Jacksonville, Florida

- Date: November 9
- Game time: 1:00 p.m. EST/12:00 p.m. CST
- Game weather: Clear, 59 °F (15 °C)
- Game attendance: 70,444
- Referee: Jerry Markbreit
- TV announcers (NBC): Dan Hicks, Jim Kelly and James Lofton
- Recap, Game Book

Game information

**First quarter**

- JAX – Pete Mitchell 5-yard pass from Mark Brunell (Mike Hollis kick), 11:30. Jaguars 7–0. **Drive: 6 plays, 52 yards, 3:30.**

**Second quarter**

- JAX – James Stewart 1-yard run (Mike Hollis kick), 13:03. Jaguars 14–0. **Drive: 5 plays, 93 yards, 2:37.**
- KC – Pete Stoyanovich 45-yard field goal, 11:01. Jaguars 14–3. **Drive: 5 plays, 22 yards, 2:03.**
- JAX – Natrone Means 14-yard run (Mike Hollis kick), 6:57. Jaguars 21–3. **Drive: 7 plays, 75 yards, 4:03.**
- JAX – Mike Hollis 52-yard field goal, 1:15. Jaguars 24–3. **Drive: 6 plays, 30 yards, 0:50.**

**Third quarter**

- No scoring plays.

**Fourth quarter**

- KC – Danan Hughes 7-yard fumble return (Pete Stoyanovich kick), 9:49. Jaguars 24–10. **Drive: 10 plays, 89 yards, 4:58.**

**Top passers**

- KC – Rich Gannon – 29/50, 314 yards, 2 INT
- JAX – Mark Brunell – 9/20, 199 yards, TD

**Top rushers**

- KC – Marcus Allen – 3 rushes, 37 yards
- JAX – Natrone Means – 14 rushes, 62 yards, TD

**Top receivers**

- KC – Tony Gonzalez – 7 receptions, 69 yards
- JAX – Jimmy Smith – 4 receptions, 112 yards

==== Week 12: vs. Denver Broncos ====
Week 12: Denver Broncos at Kansas City Chiefs – Game summary

Quarter	1	2	3	4	Total
Broncos	3	10	3	6	**22**
**Chiefs**	0	14	7	3	**24**

at Arrowhead Stadium, Kansas City, Missouri

- Date: November 16
- Game time: 12:00 p.m. CST
- Game weather: Clear and cold, 31 °F (−1 °C)
- Game attendance: 77,963
- Referee: Bill Carollo
- TV announcers (NBC): Dick Enberg, Paul Maguire, Phil Simms and Jim Gray
- Recap, Game Book

Game information

**First quarter**

- DEN – Jason Elam 21-yard field goal, 4:43. Broncos 3–0. **Drive: 15 plays, 61 yards, 7:23.**

**Second quarter**

- DEN – Shannon Sharpe 5-yard pass from John Elway (Jason Elam kick), 14:56. Broncos 10–0. **Drive: 7 plays, 98 yards, 3:40.**
- DEN – Jason Elam 38-yard field goal, 6:27. Broncos 13–0. **Drive: 9 plays, 44 yards, 5:27.**
- KC – Marcus Allen 6-yard run (Pete Stoyanovich kick), 4:28. Broncos 13–7. **Drive: 4 plays, 18 yards, 1:59.**
- KC – Danan Hughes 5-yard pass from Rich Gannon (Pete Stoyanovich kick), 1:08. Chiefs 14–13. **Drive: 4 plays, 45 yards, 1:51.**

**Third quarter**

- KC – Marcus Allen 1-yard run (Pete Stoyanovich kick), 8:04. Chiefs 21–13. **Drive: 5 plays, 36 yards, 1:37.**
- DEN – Jason Elam 38-yard field goal, 4:36. Chiefs 21–16. **Drive: 8 plays, 45 yards, 3:28.**

**Fourth quarter**

- DEN – Jason Elam 28-yard field goal, 14:14. Chiefs 21–19. **Drive: 10 plays, 49 yards, 4:00.**
- DEN – Jason Elam 34-yard field goal, 1:00. Broncos 22–21. **Drive: 6 plays, 59 yards, 1:00.**
- KC – Pete Stoyanovich 54-yard field goal, 0:00. Chiefs 24–22. **Drive: 6 plays, 36 yards, 1:00.**

**Top passers**

- DEN – John Elway – 18/31, 232 yards, TD
- KC – Rich Gannon – 11/21, 98 yards, TD, INT

**Top rushers**

- DEN – Terrell Davis – 34 rushes, 127 yards
- KC – Marcus Allen – 16 rushes, 43 yards, 2 TD

**Top receivers**

- DEN – Rod Smith – 7 receptions, 114 yards
- KC – Andre Rison – 4 receptions, 44 yards

==== Week 13: at Seattle Seahawks ====
Week 13: Kansas City Chiefs at Seattle Seahawks – Game summary

Quarter	1	2	3	4	Total
**Chiefs**	7	3	7	2	**19**
Seahawks	7	7	0	0	**14**

at Kingdome, Seattle, Washington

- Date: November 23
- Game time: 3:00 p.m. CST/1:00 p.m. PST
- Game weather: None (indoor stadium)
- Game attendance: 66,264
- Referee: Larry Nemmers
- TV announcers (NBC): Mike Breen and James Lofton
- Recap, Game Book

Game information

**First quarter**

- KC – Marcus Allen 1-yard run (Pete Stoyanovich kick), 9:52. Chiefs 7–0. **Drive: 10 plays, 76 yards, 5:08.**
- SEA – Joey Galloway 20-yard pass from Warren Moon (Todd Peterson kick), 2:46. Tied 7–7. **Drive: 13 plays, 77 yards, 7:06.**

**Second quarter**

- KC – Pete Stoyanovich 22-yard field goal, 12:15. Chiefs 10–7. **Drive: 11 plays, 65 yards, 5:31.**
- SEA – Steve Broussard 22-yard run (Todd Peterson kick), 1:06. Seahawks 14–10. **Drive: 8 plays, 62 yards, 3:40.**

**Third quarter**

- KC – Rich Gannon 1-yard run (Pete Stoyanovich kick), 9:26. Chiefs 17–14. **Drive: 8 plays, 54 yards, 3:46.**

**Fourth quarter**

- KC – Punt blocked by Joe Horn out of bounds in end zone for a Safety, 11:25. Chiefs 19–14.

**Top passers**

- KC – Rich Gannon – 15/28, 175 yards
- SEA – Warren Moon – 20/37, 248 yards, TD, INT

**Top rushers**

- KC – Donnell Bennett – 7 rushes, 35 yards
- SEA – Steve Broussard – 7 rushes, 33 yards, TD

**Top receivers**

- KC – Andre Rison – 6 receptions, 90 yards
- SEA – James McKnight – 4 receptions, 66 yards

==== Week 14: vs. San Francisco 49ers ====
Week 14: San Francisco 49ers at Kansas City Chiefs – Game summary

Quarter	1	2	3	4	Total
49ers	3	3	3	0	**9**
**Chiefs**	7	21	0	16	**44**

at Arrowhead Stadium, Kansas City, Missouri

- Date: November 30
- Game time: 12:00 p.m. CST
- Game weather: Cloudy, 45 °F (7 °C)
- Game attendance: 77,535
- Referee: Gary Lane
- TV announcers (Fox): Pat Summerall, John Madden and Pam Oliver
- Recap, Game Book

Game information

**First quarter**

- KC – Andre Rison 6-yard pass from Rich Gannon (Pete Stoyanovich kick), 7:03. Chiefs 7–0. **Drive: 7 plays, 38 yards, 2:48.**
- SF – Gary Anderson 33-yard field goal, 0:55. Chiefs 7–3. **Drive: 10 plays, 72 yards, 6:08.**

**Second quarter**

- KC – Tony Gonzalez 2-yard pass from Rich Gannon (Pete Stoyanovich kick), 9:06. Chiefs 14–3. **Drive: 12 plays, 69 yards, 6:49.**
- KC – Marcus Allen 3-yard run (Pete Stoyanovich kick), 7:04. Chiefs 21–3. **Drive: 1 play, 3 yards, 0:03.**
- KC – Ted Popson 1-yard pass from Marcus Allen (Pete Stoyanovich kick), 0:26. Chiefs 28–3. **Drive: 7 plays, 57 yards, 2:42.**
- SF – Gary Anderson 33-yard field goal, 0:00. Chiefs 28–6. **Drive: 3 plays, 43 yards, 0:26.**

**Third quarter**

- SF – Gary Anderson 40-yard field goal, 12:17. Chiefs 28–9. **Drive: 6 plays, 54 yards, 2:43.**

**Fourth quarter**

- KC – Andre Rison 29-yard pass from Rich Gannon (Pete Stoyanovich kick), 12:40. Chiefs 35–9. **Drive: 7 plays, 58 yards, 3:20.**
- KC – Terry Kirby tackled in end zone by Joe Phillips and Donnie Edwards for a Safety, 8:26. Chiefs 37–9.
- KC – Mark McMillian 12-yard interception return (Pete Stoyanovich kick), 4:13. Chiefs 44–9.

**Top passers**

- SF – Steve Young – 17/23, 184 yards, INT
- KC – Rich Gannon – 12/21, 186 yards, 3 TD, INT

**Top rushers**

- SF – Garrison Hearst – 7 rushes, 85 yards
- KC – Greg Hill – 19 rushes, 54 yards

**Top receivers**

- SF – Terrell Owens – 6 receptions, 67 yards
- KC – Andre Rison – 5 receptions, 117 yards, 2 TD

==== Week 15: vs. Oakland Raiders ====
Week 15: Oakland Raiders at Kansas City Chiefs – Game summary

Quarter	1	2	3	4	Total
Raiders	0	0	0	0	**0**
**Chiefs**	10	10	0	10	**30**

at Arrowhead Stadium, Kansas City, Missouri

- Date: December 7
- Game time: 12:00 p.m. CST
- Game weather: Overcast with fog, 28 °F (−2 °C)
- Game attendance: 76,379
- Referee: Ron Blum
- TV announcers (NBC): Charlie Jones and Bob Trumpy
- Recap, Game Book

Game information

**First quarter**

- KC – Pete Stoyanovich 44-yard field goal, 11:21. Chiefs 3–0. **Drive: 7 plays, 42 yards, 3:39.**
- KC – Donnell Bennett 9-yard run (Pete Stoyanovich kick), 3:05. Chiefs 10–0. **Drive: 12 plays, 91 yards, 6:55.**

**Second quarter**

- KC – Pete Stoyanovich 27-yard field goal, 13:26. Chiefs 13–0. **Drive: 9 plays, 25 yards, 3:46.**
- KC – Rich Gannon 5-yard run (Pete Stoyanovich kick), 2:13. Chiefs 20–0. **Drive: 13 plays, 72 yards, 7:32.**

**Third quarter**

- No scoring plays.

**Fourth quarter**

- KC – Pete Stoyanovich 40-yard field goal, 14:21. Chiefs 23–0. **Drive: 9 plays, 58 yards, 4:00.**
- KC – Tony Richardson 2-yard pass from Rich Gannon (Pete Stoyanovich kick), 6:42. Chiefs 30–0. **Drive: 9 plays, 84 yards, 5:57.**

**Top passers**

- OAK – Jeff George – 8/18, 102 yards
- KC – Rich Gannon – 15/21, 225 yards, TD

**Top rushers**

- OAK – Harvey Williams – 3 rushes, 16 yards
- KC – Donnell Bennett – 24 rushes, 85 yards, TD

**Top receivers**

- OAK – James Jett – 3 receptions, 42 yards
- KC – Andre Rison – 5 receptions, 93 yards

==== Week 16: at San Diego Chargers ====
Week 16: Kansas City Chiefs at San Diego Chargers – Game summary

Quarter	1	2	3	4	Total
**Chiefs**	7	7	8	7	**29**
Chargers	0	7	0	0	**7**

at Qualcomm Stadium, San Diego, California

- Date: December 14
- Game time: 3:00 p.m. CST/1:00 p.m. PST
- Game weather: Clear and sunny, 68 °F (20 °C)
- Game attendance: 54,594
- Referee: Bernie Kukar
- TV announcers (NBC): Tom Hammond and Randy Cross
- Recap, Game Book

Game information

**First quarter**

- KC – Marcus Allen 1-yard run (Pete Stoyanovich kick), 3:02. Chiefs 7–0. **Drive: 8 plays, 80 yards, 3:10.**

**Second quarter**

- SD – Eric Metcalf 14-yard pass from Craig Whelihan (Greg Davis kick), 14:09. Tied 7–7. **Drive: 9 plays, 53 yards, 3:53.**
- KC – Lake Dawson 21-yard pass from Rich Gannon (Pete Stoyanovich kick), 8:05. Chiefs 14–7. **Drive: 6 plays, 59 yards, 2:14.**

**Third quarter**

- KC – Pete Stoyanovich 40-yard field goal, 10:43. Chiefs 17–7. **Drive: 8 plays, 42 yards, 4:17.**
- KC – Todd Philcox sacked in end zone by Derrick Thomas for a Safety, 5:41. Chiefs 19–7.
- KC – Pete Stoyanovich 48-yard field goal, 1:42. Chiefs 22–7. **Drive: 9 plays, 34 yards, 3:59.**

**Fourth quarter**

- KC – Mark McMillian 87-yard interception return (Pete Stoyanovich kick), 6:46. Chiefs 29–7.

**Top passers**

- KC – Rich Gannon – 8/25, 116 yards, TD
- SD – Craig Whelihan – 13/20, 137 yards, TD

**Top rushers**

- KC – Marcus Allen – 8 rushes, 44 yards, TD
- SD – Gary Brown – 16 rushes, 57 yards

**Top receivers**

- KC – Andre Rison – 2 receptions, 52 yards
- SD – Tony Martin – 7 receptions, 66 yards

==== Week 17: vs. New Orleans Saints ====
Week 17: New Orleans Saints at Kansas City Chiefs – Game summary

Quarter	1	2	3	4	Total
Saints	0	0	7	6	**13**
**Chiefs**	3	9	0	13	**25**

at Arrowhead Stadium, Kansas City, Missouri

- Date: December 21
- Game time: 12:00 p.m. CST
- Game weather: Drizzle, 32 °F (0 °C)
- Game attendance: 54,594
- Referee: Walt Coleman
- TV announcers (Fox): Joe Buck and Bill Maas
- Recap, Game Book

Game information

**First quarter**

- KC – Pete Stoyanovich 30-yard field goal, 3:23. Chiefs 3–0. **Drive: 15 plays, 67 yards, 7:48.**

**Second quarter**

- KC – Pete Stoyanovich 25-yard field goal, 8:27. Chiefs 6–0. **Drive: 11 plays, 43 yards, 5:46.**
- KC – Tamarick Vanover 82-yard punt return (pass failed), 5:47. Chiefs 12–0.

**Third quarter**

- NO – Keith Poole 32-yard pass from Billy Joe Hobert (Doug Brien kick), 5:57. Chiefs 12–7. **Drive: 7 plays, 62 yards, 3:42.**

**Fourth quarter**

- KC – Marcus Allen 3-yard run (pass failed), 11:21. Chiefs 18–7. **Drive: 3 plays, 8 yards, 1:38.**
- KC – Ted Popson 3-yard pass from Rich Gannon (Pete Stoyanovich kick), 9:31. Chiefs 25–7. **Drive: 3 plays, 7 yards, 1:27.**
- NO – Keith Poole 14-yard pass from Danny Wuerffel (run failed), 2:23. Chiefs 25–13. **Drive: 8 plays, 78 yards, 3:31.**

**Top passers**

- NO – Billy Joe Hobert – 11/21, 141 yards, TD, 3 INT
- KC – Elvis Grbac – 5/14, 51 yards

**Top rushers**

- NO – Ray Zellars – 18 rushes, 47 yards
- KC – Marcus Allen – 9 rushes, 50 yards, TD

**Top receivers**

- NO – Eric Guliford – 4 receptions, 53 yards
- KC – Kimble Anders – 4 receptions, 26 yards

=== Standings ===
AFC West
	W	L	T	PCT	PF	PA	STK
^{(1)} Kansas City Chiefs	13	3	0	.813	375	232	W6
^{(4)} Denver Broncos	12	4	0	.750	472	287	W1
Seattle Seahawks	8	8	0	.500	365	362	W2
Oakland Raiders	4	12	0	.250	324	419	L5
San Diego Chargers	4	12	0	.250	266	425	L8

== Postseason ==
=== Schedule ===
Round	Date	Opponent (seed)	Result	Record	Venue	Attendance	Recap
Wild Card	First-round bye						
Divisional	January 4, 1998	Denver Broncos (4)	L 10–14	0–1	Arrowhead Stadium	76,965	Recap

=== Game summaries ===
==== AFC Divisional Playoffs: vs. (4) Denver Broncos ====
AFC Divisional Playoffs: (4) Denver Broncos at (1) Kansas City Chiefs – Game summary

Quarter	1	2	3	4	Total
Broncos	0	7	0	7	14
Chiefs	0	0	10	0	10

at Arrowhead Stadium, Kansas City, Missouri

- Date: January 4
- Game time: 3:00 p.m. CST
- Game weather: Overcast, 32 °F (0 °C)
- Game attendance: 76,965
- Referee: Jerry Markbreit
- TV announcers (NBC): Dick Enberg, Phil Simms, Paul Maguire and Jim Gray
- Recap, Game Book

Game information

First quarter

- No scoring plays.

Second quarter

- DEN – Terrell Davis 1-yard run (Jason Elam kick), 1:56. Broncos 7–0. Drive: 8 plays, 65 yards, 4:51.

Third quarter

- KC – Pete Stoyanovich 20-yard field goal, 9:42. Broncos 7–3. Drive: 11 plays, 67 yards, 5:18.
- KC – Tony Gonzalez 12-yard pass from Elvis Grbac (Pete Stoyanovich kick), 0:10. Chiefs 10–7. Drive: 4 plays, 65 yards, 1:35.

Fourth quarter

- DEN – Terrell Davis 1-yard run (Jason Elam kick), 12:32. Broncos 14–10. Drive: 6 plays, 49 yards, 1:38.

Top passers

- DEN – John Elway – 10/19, 170 yards
- KC – Elvis Grbac – 24/37, 160 yards, TD

Top rushers

- DEN – Terrell Davis – 25 rushes, 101 yards, 2 TD
- KC – Marcus Allen – 12 rushes, 37 yards

Top receivers

- DEN – Ed McCaffrey – 3 receptions, 56 yards
- KC – Andre Rison – 8 receptions, 110 yards

== See also ==
- Rich Gannon/Elvis Grbac quarterback controversy
