= 1997 San Francisco 49ers season =

American football team season

- Owner: Edward J. DeBartolo Jr.
- General manager: Carmen Policy
- Head coach: Steve Mariucci
- Offensive coordinator: Marty Mornhinweg
- Defensive coordinator: John Marshall
- Home stadium: 3Com Park

Results
- Record: 13–3
- Division place: 1st NFC West
- Playoffs: Won Divisional Playoffs (vs. Vikings) 38–22; Lost NFC Championship (vs. Packers) 10–23
- Pro Bowlers: G Kevin Gogan; QB Steve Young; DT Dana Stubblefield; LB Ken Norton, Jr. LB Lee Woodall; S Merton Hanks

The 1997 San Francisco 49ers season was the franchise's 48th season in the National Football League (NFL) and their 52nd overall. The team appeared in the NFC Championship Game for the fifth time in the 1990s. This season marked the 49ers' last appearance in the NFC title game until the 2011 season as well as the last time that they clinched the number 1 seed with home-field advantage throughout the playoffs until the 2019 season. The team's playoff run was ended by the Green Bay Packers for the third straight season.

== Offseason ==
=== NFL draft ===
1997 San Francisco 49ers draft
Round	Pick	Player	Position	College	Notes
1	26	Jim Druckenmiller	Quarterback	Virginia Tech	
2	55	Marc Edwards	Fullback	Notre Dame	
3	77	Greg Clark	Tight end	Stanford	
Made roster * Made at least one Pro Bowl during career

=== Undrafted free agents ===
1997 Undrafted free agents of note
Player	Position	College
Ryan Longwell	Kicker	California
Brandon Noble	Defensive tackle	Penn State

== Personnel ==
=== Staff / Coaches ===
1997 San Francisco 49ers staff
Front office: Owner – Edward J. DeBartolo, Jr.; President – Carmen Policy; Vice-president/Director of Football Operations – Dwight Clark; Director of player personnel – Vinny Cerrato; Head coaches: Head coach – Steve Mariucci; Offensive coaches: Offensive coordinator/quarterbacks – Marty Mornhinweg; Running backs – Tom Rathman; Wide receivers – Larry Kirksey; Tight ends – Patrick Morris; Offensive line – Bobb McKittrick; Offensive quality control – Greg Knapp	Defensive coaches: Defensive coordinator – John Marshall; Defensive line – Dwaine Board; Linebackers – Richard Smith; Defensive backs – Jim Mora; Defensive assistant – Bill McPherson; Defensive quality control – Jaime Hill; Special teams coaches: Special teams Coordinator – George Stewart; Strength and conditioning: Physical development coordinator – Jerry Attaway; Strength development coordinator – Michael Barnes

=== Roster ===
1997 San Francisco 49ers roster
Quarterbacks (QB): 11 Jeff Brohm; 14 Jim Druckenmiller; 8 Steve Young; Running backs (RB): 44 Marc Edwards FB; 40 William Floyd FB; 20 Garrison Hearst; 41 Terry Kirby; 32 Chuck Levy; Wide receivers (WR): 88 Mark Harris; 81 Terrell Owens; 80 Jerry Rice; 83 J. J. Stokes; 89 Iheanyi Uwaezuoke; Tight ends (TE): 85 Greg Clark; 86 Chad Fann; 84 Brent Jones	Offensive linemen (OL): 65 Ray Brown G; 67 Chris Dalman C; 63 Derrick Deese T; 66 Kevin Gogan G; 77 Tim Hanshaw T; 69 Rod Milstead G; 75 Frank Pollack T; 60 Joe Rudolph G; 61 Jesse Sapolu C; 76 Kirk Scrafford T; Defensive linemen (DL): 92 Roy Barker DE; 90 Junior Bryant DT; 56 Chris Doleman DE; 91 Kevin Greene DE; 96 Daryl Price DE; 71 Albert Reese DT; 94 Dana Stubblefield DT; 97 Bryant Young DT	Linebackers (LB): 55 Kevin Mitchell MLB; 51 Ken Norton Jr. OLB; 50 Gary Plummer MLB; 52 Jim Schwantz OLB; 53 James Williams MLB; 54 Lee Woodall OLB; Defensive backs (DB): 31 Zack Bronson FS; 28 Curtis Buckley CB/S; 22 Tyronne Drakeford CB; 36 Merton Hanks FS; 25 Brett Maxie SS; 46 Tim McDonald SS; 23 Marquez Pope CB; 29 Frankie Smith CB; 38 Darnell Walker CB; 26 Rod Woodson CB; Special teams (ST): 1 Gary Anderson K; 57 Randy Kirk LS; 3 Tommy Thompson P	Practice squad: -- Jeff Posey LB; -- Curtis Shearer WR; -- Carlos Thornton DE; Reserve: 79 Harris Barton T (IR); 58 Vincent Bradford LB (IR); 59 Tom Cavallo LB (IR); 74 Dave Fiore T (IR); 95 Marvin Washington DE (IR); 53 active, 5 inactive, 3 practice squad Rookies in italics

== Preseason ==
Week	Date	Opponent	Result	Record	Venue
1	August 2	at San Diego Chargers	L 13–20	0–1	Qualcomm Stadium
2	August 9	Seattle Seahawks	W 21–17	1–1	3Com Park
3	August 18	Jacksonville Jaguars	L 20–28	1–2	3Com Park
4	August 23	at Denver Broncos	L 17–31	1–3	Mile High Stadium

== Regular season ==
Opening the 1997 season with new coach Steve Mariucci and halfback Garrison Hearst, the 49ers seemed to have shored up their one major weakness from the season before. Also, additions Kevin Gogan to the offensive line and Rod Woodson to the defense were clear improvements over the previous season's roster.

However, in the first game of the season at Tampa Bay, both quarterback Steve Young and receiver Jerry Rice went down with injuries. Rice appeared to be out for the season with a serious knee injury, and Young, with yet another concussion, discussed retirement.

Young eventually came back, as did Rice for 1 1/2 quarters in the second-to-last game of the season (before getting another unrelated injury to his knee), and the team, with the league's number-one defense leading the way, pulled together and finished strongly at 13–3.

=== Schedule ===
Week	Date	Opponent	Result	Record	Venue	Attendance
1	August 31	at Tampa Bay Buccaneers	**L** 6–13	0–1	Houlihan's Stadium	62,554
2	September 7	at **St. Louis Rams**	**W** 15–12	1–1	Trans World Dome	64,630
3	September 14	**New Orleans Saints**	**W** 33–7	2–1	3Com Park	61,838
4	September 21	**Atlanta Falcons**	**W** 34–7	3–1	3Com Park	60,404
5	September 29	at **Carolina Panthers**	**W** 34–21	4–1	Ericcson Stadium	70,972
6	Bye					
7	October 12	**St. Louis Rams**	**W** 30–10	5–1	3Com Park	63,825
8	October 19	at **Atlanta Falcons**	**W** 35–28	6–1	Georgia Dome	53,378
9	October 26	at **New Orleans Saints**	**W** 23–0	7–1	Louisiana Superdome	60,443
10	November 2	Dallas Cowboys	**W** 17–10	8–1	3Com Park	68,657
11	November 10	at Philadelphia Eagles	**W** 24–12	9–1	Veterans Stadium	67,133
12	November 16	**Carolina Panthers**	**W** 27–19	10–1	3Com Park	61,500
13	November 23	San Diego Chargers	**W** 17–10	11–1	3Com Park	61,195
14	November 30	at Kansas City Chiefs	**L** 9–44	11–2	Arrowhead Stadium	77,535
15	December 7	Minnesota Vikings	**W** 28–17	12–2	3Com Park	55,761
16	December 15	Denver Broncos	**W** 34–17	13–2	3Com Park	68,461
17	December 21	at Seattle Seahawks	**L** 9–38	13–3	Kingdome	66,253
Note: Intra-division opponents are in **bold** text.

=== Game summaries ===
==== Week 1: at Tampa Bay Buccaneers ====
Steve Mariucci's debut game as 49ers head coach did not go well as Steve Young was sacked by Warren Sapp on San Francisco's first drive and was benched due to injury for Jeff Brohm until the fourth quarter. Brohm made no difference in the 13–6 Bucs win. Jerry Rice’s season all but ended in injury after four catches for 38 yards.

==== Week 2: at St. Louis Rams ====
Jim Druckenmiller started for Young as the Niners entered the TWA Dome. The Rams scored first on a field goal while San Francisco's first drive saw a missed attempt; Druckenmiller completed only ten passes (on 28 throws) and three of them were on this drive but later in the second he completed a 25-yard touchdown (it would be the only touchdown of his NFL career). The Rams led 12–7 on four Jeff Wilkins field goals until after a Lawrence Phillips fumble with 12 minutes remaining, when Garrison Hearst burst in a 35-yard Niners score on the resulting San Francisco possession. The Rams failed on fourth down in the final five minutes to seal the 15–12 Niners win.

==== Week 3: vs. New Orleans Saints ====
The Niners' first home game of the year was another win over the Saints, who were led this time by ex-Bears coach Mike Ditka. Despite being sacked five times Steve Young completed eighteen passes for 220 yards and three touchdowns. Saints quarterbacks threw a combined six interceptions in the game.

==== Week 4: vs. Atlanta Falcons ====
Young again blew past 30 points scored as the Niners routed the Falcons 34–7. Young completed 17 of 24 passes for 336 yards and two touchdowns, one a 56-yarder to Terrell Owens.

==== Week 5: vs. Carolina Panthers ====
After just one win in four career games against the Panthers in Carolina's first two seasons, the Niners upended the slumping Panthers 34–21. The Niners jumped to a 27–7 lead as they intercepted Kerry Collins three times.

==== Week 7: vs. St. Louis Rams ====
The Niners crushed the Rams at 3Com Park 30–10 as they held Tony Banks to just nine completions while sacking him four times.

==== Week 8: at Atlanta Falcons ====
A week after getting their first win of the season (against New Orleans) the Falcons hosted the Niners and their first drive ended in a 27-yard touchdown throw by Jamal Anderson to Bert Emanuel. The Niners scored three straight touchdowns and kept answering ensuing Falcons touchdowns with more of their own. With the score 35–28 San Francisco, the Falcons attempted an onside kick but the Niners recovered and won the game.

==== Week 9: at New Orleans Saints ====
The Niners traveled 470 miles southwest to the Superdome and flustered the 2–6 Saints yet again. Three Saints quarterbacks could only muster 109 yards with a pick and a fumble as the Niners rolled 23–0.

==== Week 10: vs. Dallas Cowboys ====
The playoff-level intensity of the 1992–96 period was gone as the faltering Cowboys limped into 3Com Park at 4–4 and led in the third quarter 10–7, but the surging Niners scored ten more points and then intercepted Troy Aikman in the game's final minute on a pass intended for Stepfret Williams. The 17–10 Niners win would in essence be a last hurrah for the rivalry that had dominated the league earlier in the decade. It was also the 49ers' last win over the Cowboys at home until 2022.

==== Week 11: at Philadelphia Eagles ====
The Niners traveled to Veterans Stadium and won 24–12, snaring three Eagles turnovers and scoring on a Merton Hanks fumble return and a Chuck Levy punt return.

==== Week 12: vs. Carolina Panthers ====
The Niners picked off Kerry Collins three more times and held the Panthers under 260 total yards as they reached ten straight wins 23–19.

==== Week 13: vs. San Diego Chargers ====
The collapse of San Diego's season after a 4–4 start continued as only a Paul Bradford fumble-return score marred San Francisco's 17–10 win.

==== Week 14: at Kansas City Chiefs ====
Three years after their loss to Joe Montana at Arrowhead Stadium, the Niners were crushed 44–9 as Rich Gannon threw three touchdowns and Steve Young threw three interceptions, and Jeff Brohm threw a pick-six.

==== Week 15: vs. Minnesota Vikings ====
Steve Young rebounded with two touchdowns in a 28–17 win over the Vikings. In a harbinger of the Vikings' subsequent season, Randall Cunningham played the whole game and had two touchdowns.

==== Week 16: vs. Denver Broncos ====
The Niners reached thirteen wins by crushing the Super Bowl-bound Denver Broncos 34–17. The Broncos led 17–14 in the third quarter but after a Niners field goal John Elway was picked off by Merton Hanks and Hanks scored. Another Niners field goal and a fumble-return score by Kevin Greene salted away the San Francisco win. Jerry Rice returned for this one game and had three catches and a touchdown.

==== Week 17: at Seattle Seahawks ====
Having secured the top playoff seed, the Niners played all three of their quarterbacks at the Kingdome, and the frustrated Seahawks ended their 8–8 season on a high note as Warren Moon erupted for four touchdowns in only his second career win (38–9) in six games against San Francisco (the other win was a 10–7 win with the Oilers in 1993).

=== Standings ===
NFC West
	W	L	T	PCT	PF	PA	STK
^{(1)} San Francisco 49ers	13	3	0	.813	375	265	L1
Carolina Panthers	7	9	0	.438	265	314	L2
Atlanta Falcons	7	9	0	.438	320	361	L1
New Orleans Saints	6	10	0	.375	237	327	L1
St. Louis Rams	5	11	0	.313	299	359	W1

== Postseason ==
=== Schedule ===
Round	Date	Opponent (seed)	Result	Record	Stadium
Wild Card	First-round bye				
NFC Divisional Playoff	January 3, 1998	Minnesota Vikings (6)	W 38–22	1–0	Candlestick Park
NFC Championship Game	January 11, 1998	Green Bay Packers (2)	L 10–23	1–1	Candlestick Park

Toward the end of the season, things appeared to be going well for the team's postseason prospects. But in the second-to-last game of the season, Rice was injured again and deemed out for the playoffs. Similarly, the team's offensive heart for the season, running back Garrison Hearst, had a broken collar bone through the postseason and did not return to full health before the end of the season.

Despite not having either their leading receiver or their starting running back, the 49ers were able to make it to their 7th NFC championship game in 10 years. But not having an elite receiver or solid running back showed glaringly in their loss to the Packers in the conference championship game; Hearst returned, but his injury was still a problem as he only played a few ineffective snaps.

==== NFC Divisional Game vs. (6) Minnesota Vikings ====
NFC Divisional Playoff: Minnesota Vikings at San Francisco 49ers – Game Summary

Quarter	1	2	3	4	Total
Vikings	7	0	7	8	22
49ers	7	14	10	7	38

at 3Com Park

- Date: January 3, 1998
- Game time: 1 p.m. PDT
- Game weather: 54 °F or 12.2 °C, relative humidity 88%, wind 13 miles per hour (21 km/h; 11 kn)

Game information

First quarter

- SF - William Floyd 1-yard rush (Gary Anderson kick). 49ers 7–0
- Min - Cris Carter 66 yard pass from Randall Cunningham (Eddie Murray kick). Tie 7–7

Second quarter

- SF - Terry Kirby 1-yard rush (Gary Anderson kick). 49ers 14–7
- SF - Ken Norton 23-yard interception return (Gary Anderson kick). 49ers 21–7

Third quarter

- SF - Gary Anderson 34 yard field goal. 49ers 24–7
- Min - Cris Carter 3 yard pass from Randall Cunningham (Eddie Murray kick). 49ers 24–14
- SF - Terrell Owens 15 yard pass from Steve Young (Gary Anderson kick). 49ers 31–14

Fourth quarter

- SF - Terry Kirby 1-yard rush (Gary Anderson kick). 49ers 38–14
- Min - Matthew Hatchette 13 yard pass from Randall Cunningham (2 point successful). 49ers 38–22

Vikings

- Randall Cunningham. 18-40, 331 yards, 3 TD, 1 Int
- Cris Carter. 6 Rec, 93 yards, 2 TD

49ers

- Steve Young. 21-30, 224 yards, 1 TD, 0 Int.
- Terry Kirby. 25 rush, 120 yards, 2 TD.
- JJ Stokes. 9 rec, 101 yards

49ers get in the NFC Championship game and lost the third straight time to the Packers 23-10.

==== NFC Championship Game vs. (2) Green Bay Packers ====
NFC Championship at San Francisco 49ers – Game Summary

Quarter	1	2	3	4	Total
Packers	3	10	0	10	23
49ers	0	3	0	7	10

at 3Com Park

- Date: January 11, 1998
- Game time: 1 p.m. PDT
- Game weather: 54 °F or 12.2 °C, relative humidity 90%, wind 10 miles per hour (16 km/h; 8.7 kn)

Game information

First quarter

- GB - Ryan Longwell 19 yard field goal. Packers 3–0

Second quarter

- GB - Antonio Freeman 27 yard pass from Brett Favre (Ryan Longwell kick). Packers 10–0
- SF - Gary Anderson 34 yard field goal. Packers 10–3
- GB - Ryan Longwell 43 yard field goal. Packers 13–3

Third quarter no scoring Fourth quarter

- GB - Ryan Longwell 25 yard field goal. Packers 16–3
- GB - Dorsey Levens 5-yard rush (Ryan Longwell kick). Packers 23–3
- SF - Chuck Levy 95 yard kickoff return. (Gary Anderson kick). Packers 23–10

Packers

- Brett Favre. 16-27, 222 yards, 1 TD, 0 Int
- Dorsey Levens. 27 rush, 114 yards, 1 TD

49ers

- Steve Young. 23-38, 250 yards, 0 TD, 1 Int
- Terrell Owens. 6 rec, 100 yards

Turnovers

- Packers - 0
- 49ers - 2

The 49ers and Packers met in the playoffs for the 3rd year in a row, and for the 3rd year in a row, the Packers defeated the 49ers. The 49ers were battling multiple injuries in the game, including missing star wide receiver Jerry Rice. The lack of depth on offense showed throughout the game, as the offense generated just 3 points. The only touchdown of the game for the 49ers was Chuck Levy's 95-yard kick return for a touchdown. But by then, the Packers had a commanding 23–10 lead in the 4th quarter. With the loss, the 49ers finished the year at 14–4. As of 2025, this marks the 49ers last playoff loss to the Packers.

== Awards and records ==
- Steve Young, Led NFL, Passer Rating, 104.7 Rating
