= 1997 New Orleans Saints season =

NFL team season

- Head coach: Mike Ditka
- Offensive coordinator: Danny Abramowicz
- Defensive coordinator: Zaven Yaralian
- Home stadium: Louisiana Superdome

Results
- Record: 6–10
- Division place: 4th NFC West
- Playoffs: Did not qualify
- Pro Bowlers: T Willie Roaf

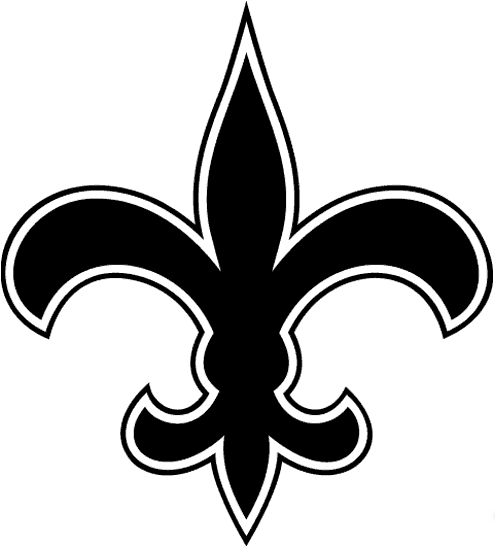
Team Logo

The 1997 New Orleans Saints season was the franchise's 31st season in the National Football League (NFL), and 24th at the Louisiana Superdome. The team improved upon its 1996 record of 3–13, winning six games, but failed to qualify for the playoffs for the fifth consecutive season.

This was the Saints’ first season with Mike Ditka as head coach. New Orleans hired the former Chicago Bears head coach after Ditka had spent the previous four seasons as a studio analyst for NBC Sports.

== Offseason ==
=== NFL draft ===
1997 New Orleans Saints draft
Round	Pick	Player	Position	College	Notes
1	10	Chris Naeole	Guard	Colorado	
2	33	Rob Kelly	Defensive back	Ohio State	
2	39	Jared Tomich	Defensive end	Nebraska	
3	62	Troy Davis	Running back	Iowa State	
4	99	Danny Wuerffel	Quarterback	Florida	
4	116	Keith Poole	Wide receiver	Arizona State	
6	165	Nicky Savoie	Tight end	LSU	
Made roster

== Personnel ==
=== Staff ===
1997 New Orleans Saints staff
Front office: Owner – Tom Benson; President/general manager/chief operating officer – Bill Kuharich; Vice-president of football operations/assistant general manager – Chet Franklin; Director of college scouting – Bruce Lemmerman; Head coaches: Head coach – Mike Ditka; Assistant head coach/linebackers – Rick Venturi; Offensive coaches: Offensive coordinator – Danny Abramowicz; Quarterbacks – Tom Clements; Running backs – Tom Moore; Wide receivers – Harold Jackson; Tight Ends/offensive line Assistant – Dan Neal; Offensive line – Dick Stanfel; Offensive assistant – Judd Garrett	Defensive coaches: Defensive coordinator – Zaven Yaralian; Defensive line – Walt Corey; Defensive backs – Willie Shaw; Defensive assistant – John Pagano; Special teams coaches: Special teams – Bobby April; Strength and conditioning: Strength and conditioning – Mike Woicik; Assistant strength and conditioning – Jack Del Rio

== Roster ==
1997 New Orleans Saints roster
Quarterbacks (QB): 12 Billy Joe Hobert; 13 Doug Nussmeier; 7 Danny Wuerffel; Running backs (RB): 24 Mario Bates; 40 Wes Bender; 28 Troy Davis; 44 Fred McCrary FB; 34 Ray Zellars FB; Wide receivers (WR): 84 Eric Guliford; 80 Alvin Harper; 88 Andre Hastings; 81 Randal Hill; 83 Keith Poole; 86 Gunnard Twyner; Tight ends (TE): 87 John Farquhar; 85 Nicky Savoie; 82 Irv Smith	Offensive linemen (OL): 69 Tom Ackerman C/G; 73 Isaac Davis G; 62 Jerry Fontenot C; 76 Keno Hills G/T; 72 Trezelle Jenkins T; 74 Clarence Jones T; 67 Andy McCollum G; 77 Willie Roaf T; 71 Ricky Siglar T; 66 Mike Verstegen G; Defensive linemen (DL): 97 La'Roi Glover DT; 94 Joe Johnson DE; 93 Wayne Martin DT; 92 Darren Mickell DE; 95 Austin Robbins DT; 99 Pio Sagapolutele DT; 91 Brady Smith DE; 90 Jared Tomich DE	Linebackers (LB): 50 Ink Aleaga OLB; 51 Derrick Barnes MLB; 56 Ernest Dixon MLB; 55 Mark Fields OLB; 59 Keith Mitchell OLB; 54 Winfred Tubbs MLB; Defensive backs (DB): 21 Eric Allen CB; 30 Je'Rod Cherry CB/FS; 38 Donovan Greer CB; 23 Chris Hewitt SS; 33 Rob Kelly SS; 29 Sammy Knight FS; 25 Alex Molden CB; 30 Anthony Newman FS; 26 Mickey Washington CB; Special teams (ST): 10 Doug Brien K; 60 Kendall Gammon LS; 3 Mark Royals P	Practice squad: 63 Duane Ashman DE; 27 Anthony Cobbs CB; 9 Jake Delhomme QB; 46 Earl Little S; Reserve: 89 Brett Bech WR (IR); 20 Derek Brown RB (IR); 53 Don Davis LB (IR); 96 Luke Fickell DT (IR); 52 Richard Harvey LB (IR); 64 Mike Jerich T (PUP); 58 Brian Jones LB (IR); 45 Ron Leshinski TE (Military Reserve); 65 Chris Naeole G (IR); 5 Heath Shuler QB (IR); 53 active, 10 inactive, 4 practice squad Rookies in italics

== Regular season ==
=== Schedule ===
Week	Date	Opponent	Result	Record	Venue	Attendance
1	August 31	at **St. Louis Rams**	**L** 24–38	0–1	TWA Dome	64,575
2	September 7	San Diego Chargers	**L** 6–20	0–2	Louisiana Superdome	65,760
3	September 14	at **San Francisco 49ers**	**L** 7–33	0–3	3Com Park	61,838
4	September 21	Detroit Lions	**W** 35–17	1–3	Louisiana Superdome	50,016
5	September 28	at New York Giants	**L** 9–14	1–4	Giants Stadium	68,891
6	October 5	at Chicago Bears	**W** 20–17	2–4	Soldier Field	58,865
7	October 12	**Atlanta Falcons**	**L** 17–23	2–5	Louisiana Superdome	65,619
8	October 19	**Carolina Panthers**	**L** 0–13	2–6	Louisiana Superdome	50,963
9	October 26	**San Francisco 49ers**	**L** 0–23	2–7	Louisiana Superdome	60,443
10	Bye					
11	November 9	at Oakland Raiders	**W** 13–10	3–7	Oakland–Alameda County Coliseum	40,091
12	November 16	Seattle Seahawks	**W** 20–17 (OT)	4–7	Louisiana Superdome	50,493
13	November 23	at **Atlanta Falcons**	**L** 3–20	4–8	Georgia Dome	48,620
14	November 30	at **Carolina Panthers**	**W** 16–13	5–8	Ericcson Stadium	57,957
15	December 7	**St. Louis Rams**	**L** 27–34	5–9	Louisiana Superdome	54,803
16	December 14	Arizona Cardinals	**W** 27–10	6–9	Louisiana Superdome	45,517
17	December 21	at Kansas City Chiefs	**L** 13–25	6–10	Arrowhead Stadium	66,772
Note: Intra-division opponents are in **bold** text.

=== Standings ===
NFC West
	W	L	T	PCT	PF	PA	STK
^{(1)} San Francisco 49ers	13	3	0	.813	375	265	L1
Carolina Panthers	7	9	0	.438	265	314	L2
Atlanta Falcons	7	9	0	.438	320	361	L1
New Orleans Saints	6	10	0	.375	237	327	L1
St. Louis Rams	5	11	0	.313	299	359	W1
