= John Browning (American football) =

American football player (born 1973)

No. 93
- Position: Defensive lineman

Personal information
- Born: September 30, 1973 (age 53); Miami, Florida, U.S.
- Listed height: 6 ft 4 in (1.93 m)
- Listed weight: 297 lb (135 kg)

Career information
- High school: North Miami (North Miami, Florida)
- College: West Virginia
- NFL draft: 1996: 3rd round, 68th overall pick

Career history
- Kansas City Chiefs (1996–2006); Denver Broncos (2007)*
- * Offseason or practice squad member only

Career NFL statistics
- Tackles: 307
- Sacks: 27.5
- Interceptions: 1
- Stats at Pro Football Reference

John Edward Browning (born September 30, 1973) is an American former professional football player who was a defensive tackle in the National Football League (NFL). He played in 24 regular season games (12 starts) for West Virginia University, tallying 78 tackles, 8 sacks, a fumble recovery and a pass deflection. He was selected in the 1996 NFL draft in the third round by the Kansas City Chiefs.

== NFL career statistics ==
Legend
**Bold**	Career high

=== Regular season ===
Year	Team	Games		Tackles				Interceptions				Fumbles			
Year	Team	GP	GS	Comb	Solo	Ast	Sck	Int	Yds	TD	Lng	FF	FR	Yds	TD
1996	KAN	13	2	21	17	4	2.0	0	0	0	0	**1**	0	0	0
1997	KAN	14	13	33	29	4	4.0	0	0	0	0	0	**1**	0	0
1998	KAN	8	8	30	20	**10**	0.0	0	0	0	0	0	0	0	0
2000	KAN	16	16	**48**	**38**	**10**	6.0	**1**	0	0	0	0	**1**	0	0
2001	KAN	6	6	20	15	5	1.5	0	0	0	0	0	0	0	0
2002	KAN	16	16	39	33	6	**7.0**	0	0	0	0	0	**1**	0	0
2003	KAN	16	16	42	37	5	0.5	0	0	0	0	0	**1**	**7**	0
2004	KAN	16	7	39	32	7	4.5	0	0	0	0	**1**	0	0	0
2005	KAN	16	12	35	31	4	2.0	0	0	0	0	**1**	0	0	0
		121	96	307	252	55	27.5	1	0	0	0	3	4	7	0

=== Playoffs ===
Year	Team	Games		Tackles				Interceptions				Fumbles			
Year	Team	GP	GS	Comb	Solo	Ast	Sck	Int	Yds	TD	Lng	FF	FR	Yds	TD
1997	KAN	1	0	1	1	0	0.0	0	0	0	0	0	0	0	0
2003	KAN	1	1	**4**	**4**	0	0.0	0	0	0	0	0	0	0	0
		2	1	5	5	0	0.0	0	0	0	0	0	0	0	0
