= Joe Rowe (American football) =

American football player (born 1973)

No. 42
- Position: Cornerback

Personal information
- Born: December 8, 1973 (age 52); East Elmhurst, New York, U.S.
- Listed height: 6 ft 0 in (1.83 m)
- Listed weight: 195 lb (88 kg)

Career information
- High school: Greensville Co. (VA)
- College: Virginia
- NFL draft: 1997: undrafted

Career history
- St. Louis Rams (1997)*; Green Bay Packers (1997)*; St. Louis Rams (1997); Scottish Claymores (1999)
- * Offseason or practice squad member only

Career NFL statistics
- Games played: 2
- Stats at Pro Football Reference

Joseph Rowe III (born December 8, 1973) is an American former professional football player who was a cornerback for one season with the St Louis Rams of the National Football League (NFL) in 1997. He played college football for the Virginia Cavaliers. He was on the Green Bay Packers practice squad for a season, and also played for the Scottish Claymores in 1999.
