= Ted Popson =

American football player (born 1966)

No. 87, 85, 48
- Position: Tight end

Personal information
- Born: September 10, 1966 (age 60); Granada Hills, California, U.S.
- Listed height: 6 ft 4 in (1.93 m)
- Listed weight: 245 lb (111 kg)

Career information
- College: Portland State
- NFL draft: 1991: 11th round, 306th overall pick

Career history
- New York Giants (1991–1992)*; London Monarchs (1992); San Francisco 49ers (1993–1996); Kansas City Chiefs (1997–1998)
- * Offseason or practice squad member only

Awards and highlights
- Super Bowl champion (XXIX)

Career NFL statistics
- Receptions: 103
- Receiving yards: 980
- Receiving touchdowns: 8
- Stats at Pro Football Reference

Theodore Paul Popson (born September 10, 1966) is an American former professional football player who was a tight end in the World League of American Football (WLAF) and the National Football League (NFL). He played college football for the Portland State Vikings and was selected by the New York Giants in the 11th round of the 1991 NFL draft. In 1992, Popson played for the WLAF's London Monarchs. He then played for the NFL's San Francisco 49ers (1994–1996) and Kansas City Chiefs (1997–1998).

Popson co-hosts the sports talk radio program called Steak & Popson, with Steve Salisbury, at KAHI AM 950, in Sacramento, CA and has worked for 95.7FM in San Francisco, CA.
