= Sir Mawn Wilson =

American football player (born 1973)

No. 6, 88
- Position: Wide receiver

Personal information
- Born: June 4, 1973 (age 53); Tampa, Florida, U.S.

Career information
- College: Syracuse
- NFL draft: 1996: undrafted

Career history
- Miami Dolphins (1996)*; Arizona Rattlers (1997); Denver Broncos (1997); New England Patriots (1998–1999); Tampa Bay Storm (2001–2002); Buffalo Destroyers (2003); Carolina Cobras (2004); New York Dragons (2005); Austin Wranglers (2006)
- * Offseason or practice squad member only

Awards and highlights
- Super Bowl champion (XXXII); ArenaBowl champion (1997)
- Stats at ArenaFan.com

Sir Mawn Wilson (born June 4, 1973) is an American former professional football wide receiver in the National Football League (NFL) and Arena Football League (AFL). He played college football at Syracuse. On March 25, 2002, Wilson re-signed with the Tampa Bay Storm.

Wilson played from 1997 to 2006 during his career with the Arizona Rattlers, Austin Wranglers, Buffalo Destroyers, Carolina Cobras, New York Dragons and Tampa Bay Storm. Wilson caught 139 passes for 1,501 yards and 18 receiving touchdowns in his career.
