= History of Kansas City Chiefs quarterbacks =

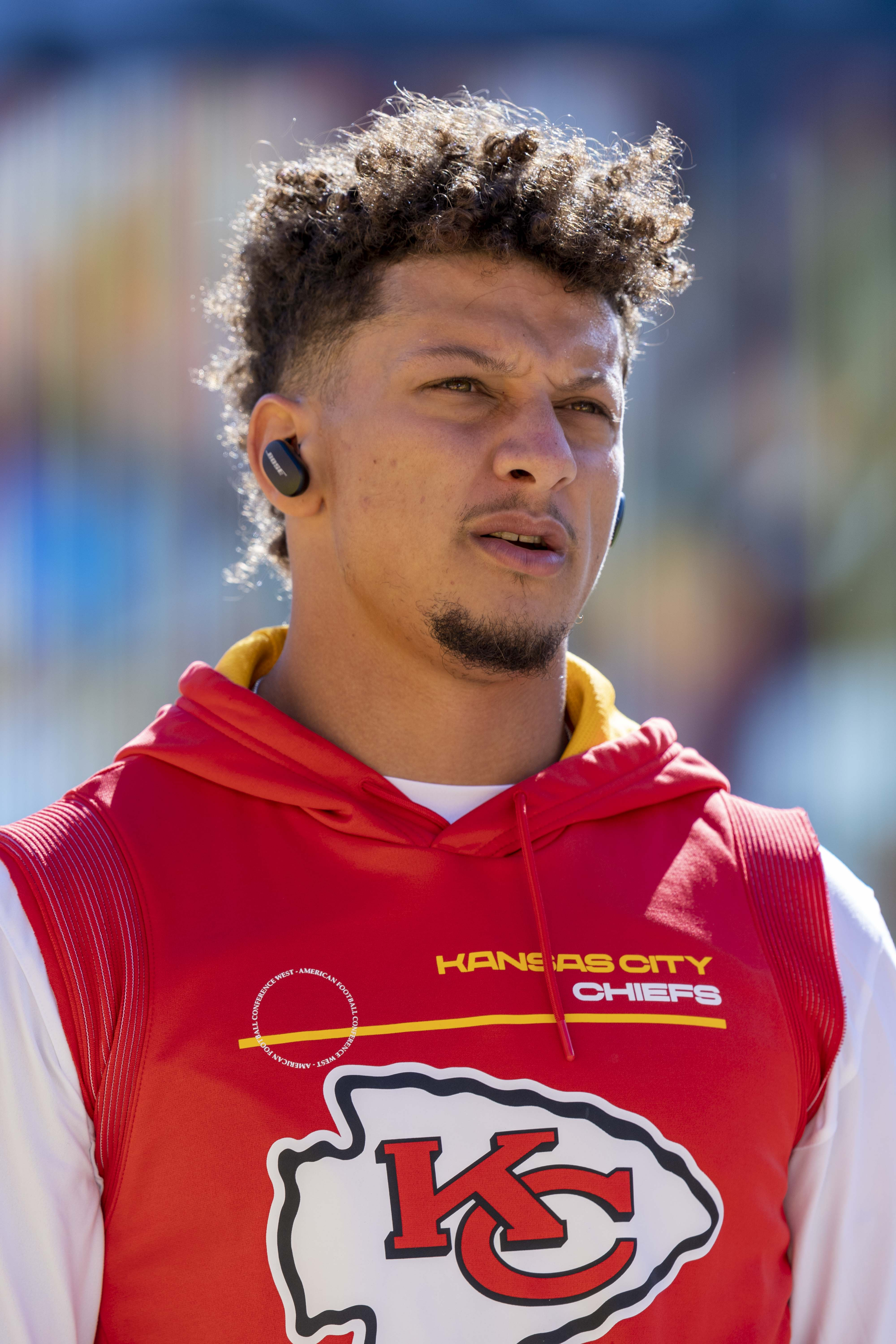
Patrick Mahomes, the current starting quarterback for the Kansas City Chiefs.

31 quarterbacks have started for the National Football League's Kansas City Chiefs since their franchise began. The team has also had numerous backup quarterbacks that have stolen the spotlight from the starters.

Under Len Dawson, the Texans/Chiefs won three American Football League championships and appeared in two Super Bowl championship games. Dawson was named Most Valuable Player following the Chiefs' victory in Super Bowl IV. Dawson played a total of 13 seasons with Kansas City and retired with many franchise records. Despite having little success in developing and drafting a quality quarterback of their own, the Chiefs have achieved success under many veteran quarterbacks, including Dave Krieg, Joe Montana, Elvis Grbac, Trent Green and Alex Smith. The Chiefs have often relied on veteran leadership at the position. It wasn't until 2017 the Chiefs were able to successfully draft and groom a quarterback of their own, Patrick Mahomes, who brought them their first AFC Championship title and second Super Bowl victory.

== History ==
=== Starting quarterbacks ===
The Chiefs have had many notable and established quarterbacks on their squad at different times. Hall of Famers Len Dawson and Joe Montana led the Chiefs in two successful eras and both led the team to playoff appearances in their first seasons.

The franchise's first starter was Cotton Davidson, who started 25 games for the Texans before being traded in 1962. Team owner Lamar Hunt traded Davidson to the Oakland Raiders for the first-overall selection in the 1963 AFL draft. The franchise used that pick to select future Hall of Fame defensive tackle Buck Buchanan.

In Davidson's absence, free agent quarterback Len Dawson signed with the team on July 2, 1962 after spending a five-year career in the NFL with Pittsburgh and Cleveland. In Dallas, Dawson was rejoined with head coach Hank Stram who served as an assistant coach with Purdue, where Dawson played college football. In his first season with the Texans, Dawson led the team to a double-overtime victory over the Houston Oilers in the AFL Championship Game. The victory brought the team's first league championship.

"'Lenny the Cool'...He was our leader. He was the man."

— Buck Buchanan, Chiefs defensive end (1963–1975).

Len Dawson was the franchise's most successful quarterback, playing in 182 regular season games (158 starts) for the Texans/Chiefs, and holds many franchise records. He was nicknamed "Lenny the Cool" for his calm composure on the field. Dawson completed 2,115 of 3,696 passes for 28,507 yards with 237 touchdowns and 178 interceptions, good for an 82.6 career rating. He ranks first in team history in pass attempts, completions, passing yards and touchdowns. He led the Chiefs to 94 regular season wins and three AFL titles. Dawson led the Chiefs to an appearance in the first AFL–NFL Championship Game (later known as "Super Bowl I") against the Green Bay Packers. He was named MVP of Super Bowl IV when he directed Kansas City to a 23–7 victory over the Minnesota Vikings. Dawson was named to six AFL All-Star teams and one Pro Bowl squad, in addition to being named the AFL Player of the Year in 1962. Dawson was also named the NFL Man of the Year in 1973. Dawson threw a franchise record six touchdown passes against the Denver Broncos on November 1, 1964 in a 49–39 victory. In 1966, while still playing for the Chiefs, Dawson became the sports director and anchor for KMBC-TV, a local Kansas City ABC affiliate. As of 2009, Dawson is still KMBC's sports director. He would practice and play for the Chiefs during the day and later help anchor news broadcasts at night. After retiring from the NFL in 1975, Dawson began hosting Inside the NFL on HBO and worked network broadcasts for NBC. He joined the Chiefs' radio broadcast team in 1984 and provides color commentary to game broadcasts.

Bill Kenney was the team's starting quarterback in various times between 1980 and 1988 and compiled a 46–51 record. Kenney played behind a porous offensive line and holds the franchise record for most times sacked (195). Kenney's All-Pro wide receiver teammate Carlos Carson said, "I don't care who you are, it's tough to throw a pass when you're lying on your back." Kenney was selected to the 1984 Pro Bowl. After retiring from professional football, Kenney became a State Senator for the Missouri Senate.

The Chiefs made a mistake in drafting quarterback Todd Blackledge in the 1983 NFL draft believing that Blackledge was a better choice than Jim Kelly and Dan Marino. Blackledge never started a full season for Kansas City while Kelly and Marino played Hall of Fame careers. Blackledge started 24 total games in Kansas City, but inconsistent play led to him sharing time with Bill Kenney from 1984–1987.

In the 1987 season, the Chiefs used five starting quarterbacks for the only time in franchise history. Doug Hudson was the last quarterback drafted by the team to start a game until Brodie Croyle started in 2007. In Hudson's only game, he was sacked in the endzone for a safety by the Denver Broncos' Jim Ryan. The sack and fumble is the only recorded statistic for his career.

In 1988, the Chiefs traded two draft selections and safety Mark Robinson to the Tampa Bay Buccaneers in exchange for veteran quarterback Steve DeBerg. DeBerg spent four seasons with the Chiefs, leading the team to 2 postseason appearances (in 1990, he did so despite playing with a broken finger). DeBerg compiled 11,873 passing yards, 67 touchdowns and 50 interceptions with the Chiefs with an 81.8 passer rating. DeBerg's best year was 1990 with a 101.2 quarterback rating, passing for 3,444 yards, 23 touchdowns and only 4 interceptions.

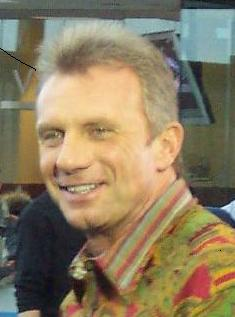
In his first season with the team, Joe Montana led the Chiefs to their first AFC Championship Game appearance, a feat they would not accomplish again until 2018.

On April 21, 1993, Kansas City acquired quarterback Joe Montana, safety David Whitmore, and a third-round draft pick in the 1993 NFL draft (Will Shields) by sending their first-round selection to the San Francisco 49ers. Montana had already agreed on a three-year, $10 million contract before getting traded. Montana would lead the Chiefs to the AFC Championship Game, a feat they would not accomplish again until 2018. He was also selected to the 1994 Pro Bowl. In 1994, Montana led the Chiefs into Mile High Stadium to face John Elway and the Denver Broncos on Monday Night Football. Elway performed some of his late-game magic but it was Montana who stole the show in a game later known as the "Monday Night Shootout." The two teams entered the fourth quarter tied at 21, and a Chiefs field goal put the team on top 24–21. After a turnover by the Broncos, Kansas City appeared ready to run out the clock behind running back Marcus Allen. Allen fumbled, leaving the Broncos with possession of the ball, and Elway led the Broncos to a touchdown to give Denver a 28–24 lead. However, with 1:29 remaining, Montana led the Chiefs 75 yards down the field to score the last minute go ahead touchdown, and the Chiefs snapped an 11-game losing streak to Denver with a 31–28 victory.

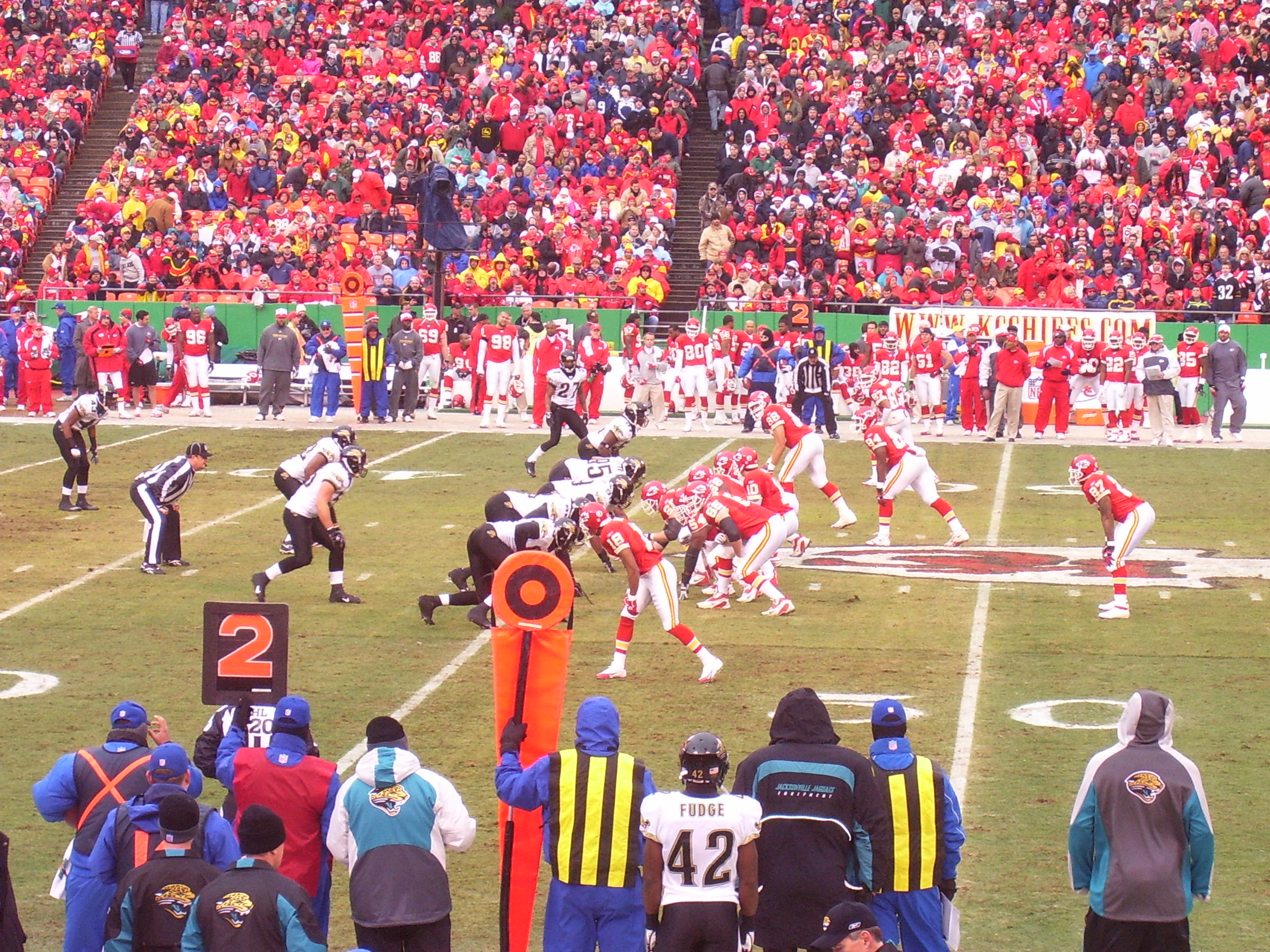
Trent Green lines up with the Chiefs' offense, 2006.

After the departure of Elvis Grbac in 2001, the Chiefs acquired Trent Green in a trade with the St. Louis Rams. In his first season, Green struggled and was called "a big disappointment." Phil Kloster famously nicknamed him "Tr-INT" after he had a particularly rough outing versus Denver in which he threw 4 interceptions to Deltha O'Neal. This was later picked up from Chiefs fan page Chiefsplanet by Jason Whitlock who printed the moniker in the Kansas City Star and took the nickname to fame. By his third season, Green led the Chiefs to a 13–3 record in 2003 and was called the "mastermind of the Chiefs' high-powered offense." In 2004, Green threw for 4,591 yards and a league-high 556 passing attempts. Green was selected to two Pro Bowl games in 2003 and 2005. Green's 81-game start streak for the Chiefs from 2001–2006 is a franchise record at the position. His 88 career starts for the Chiefs is second behind Dawson. Green is the Chiefs' career leader in passer rating (87.3), average gain per attempt (7.7), 300-yard passing games (24), completion percentage (61.94), and completions of 20 or more yards (274). He is the only quarterback in Chiefs history to throw a "perfect game" registering a 158.3 passer rating against Detroit on December 14, 2003.

In the past few decades, the Chiefs have relied on veteran quarterbacks to lead their team. The Chiefs never drafted their own quarterback to develop until Brodie Croyle was chosen in the 2006 NFL draft and claimed the starting position in 2007. In the years prior to drafting Croyle (1960–2005), the Chiefs had drafted 30 quarterbacks and each led the team to victory just 57 times, or 15%.

When head coach Herman Edwards was hired in 2006, he stated that he was looking towards implementing a "youth movement" into his game plan, and he began his roster moves at the quarterback position. Croyle was the team's starting quarterback heading into the 2008 season, however, he suffered an injury and Damon Huard played in Croyle's absence. Huard started the Chiefs' game in Week 2, but he himself suffered an injury and Tyler Thigpen substituted for the remainder of the game. Thigpen started for the Chiefs in Huard and Croyle's absence against the Falcons. Croyle returned in Week 7 to start against the Tennessee Titans but suffered a season-ending knee injury. Following the injuries to Croyle and Huard, Thigpen became the de facto starting quarterback.

After a poor first career start for Thigpen against Atlanta, a game in which he threw three interceptions, the Chiefs implemented the spread offense. With the absence of RB Larry Johnson, the central part of the Chiefs' offense in years past, offensive coordinator Chan Gailey adjusted the offense to mimic the spread formation run by Thigpen at Coastal Carolina. It was considered by many in the NFL as a gamble, since there have been doubts over the spread offense's longterm success at the professional level. It was also a new direction for head coach Herman Edwards, who has long had a reputation for favoring more conservative, run-oriented offenses. After it was implemented, Edwards began seeing his team gain confidence with every game it played in that wide-open system, as the Chiefs began to become competitive once again on offense.

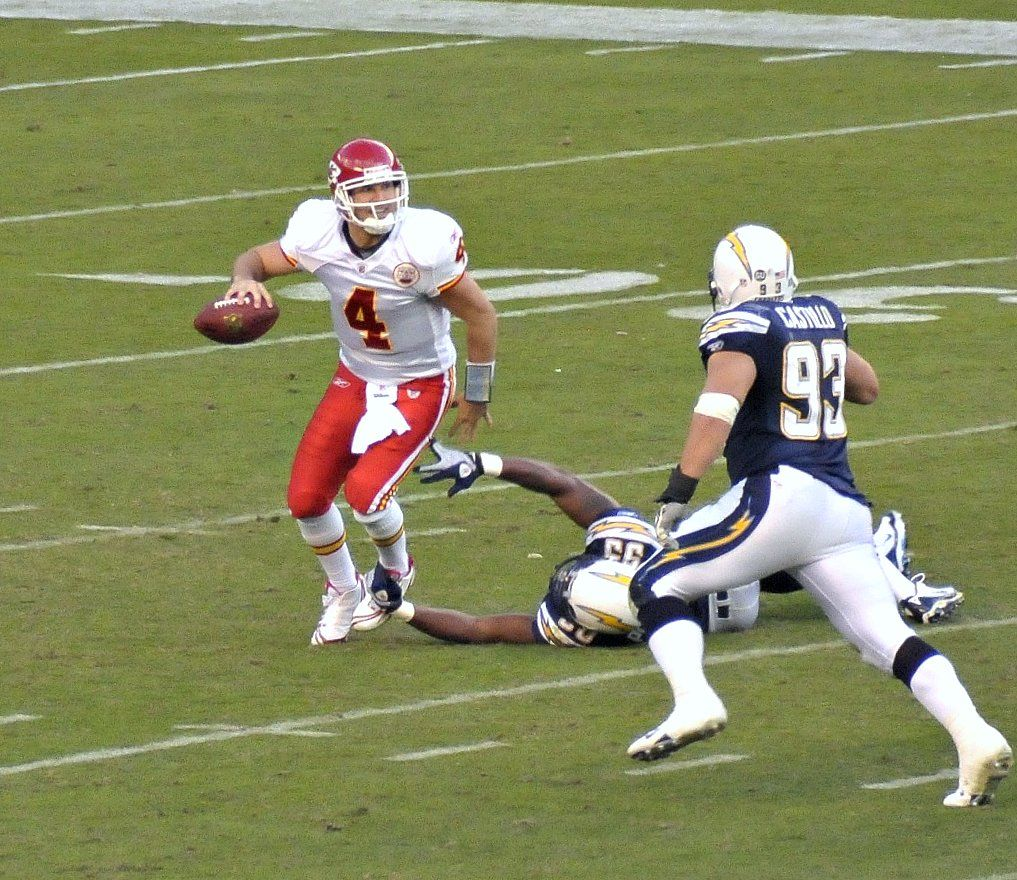
Tyler Thigpen avoids a sack from Shaun Phillips, 2008.

The switch to the spread offense paid off for Thigpen and his abilities. Prior to the Chiefs implementing the spread offense, Thigpen had been playing erratically with the Chiefs, and he suddenly became poised and effective running the new offense. In Thigpen's second career start, he passed for 280 yards with a 69.4% completion rate, with two touchdowns and no interceptions against the New York Jets, nearly leading the Chiefs to win over the heavily favored Jets. Thigpen's passer rating climbed from 44.3 to 76.9 in the five games following his initial start at Atlanta. The Chiefs scored more than 10 points just twice in their first six games, but scored more offensive points than that in every game since, and twice topped 25 points.

Thigpen won his first game as the Chiefs' starter on November 30 against the Oakland Raiders, leading Kansas City to a 20–13 victory. Thigpen finished 15-for-22 for 162 yards and ran for 48 more. The offensive gameplan finally paid off and resulted in a victory which ended a 7-game losing streak for the Chiefs. Thigpen ended the season starting nine games for Chiefs with a 1–8 record. Six of the losses were within 7-point or less margins. He registered 21 total touchdowns, 12 interceptions, and 2,994 all-purpose yards.

On February 28, 2009, the Chiefs acquired QB Matt Cassel and LB Mike Vrabel from the New England Patriots for the #34 overall selection in the 2009 NFL draft. Cassel competed with Thigpen for the starting quarterback position during training camp and won decisively.

Matt Cassel did not have immediate success as the starter for Kansas City, as he led the team to a 4–12 season in 2009, throwing for 2,924 yards and 16 touchdowns, while also throwing 16 interceptions. The next year as the starter, he showed marked improvement, and helped the Chiefs attain a 10–6 record in 2010 by throwing for 3,116 yards, 27 touchdowns, and only 7 interceptions. Cassel's effective quarterback play helped the Kansas City Chiefs win the AFC West and return to the postseason, where they faced the Baltimore Ravens. The game ended with a loss, however, with the final score being 30–7. Cassel began the 2011 season as the starting quarterback, however during a loss in Week 10 against the Denver Broncos, he injured his hand and did not play the rest of the season. He was replaced by Tyler Palko, who had only thrown six passes in his career up to that point. He started four games for Chiefs, and led them to a 1–3 record before being benched in a 37–10 loss to the Jets in Week 14. Kyle Orton, the former Denver Broncos quarterback, was chosen to start the Week 15 game against the formerly unbeaten 13-0 Green Bay Packers, and led them to an improbable upset. The next game, Orton led the Chiefs to a close loss in overtime against the Oakland Raiders, ending their hopes of a playoff bid. They finished the season at 7–9, with nine games started by Cassel, four by Palko, and three by Orton. The Chiefs began their 2012 season with high hopes, but they were quickly dashed, as both Cassel and late season replacement Brady Quinn, also a former Broncos quarterback, split the 2012 season even with 8 games started each. The team tied with the 2012 Arizona Cardinals for most interceptions (20) with Cassel throwing 12 and Quinn throwing 8. The Chiefs ended with the worst record in the NFL in offensive passing and finished the season with a 2–14 record. Subsequently, head coach Romeo Crennel and general manager Scott Pioli were both fired, and the Chiefs brought in former Eagles head coach Andy Reid and John Dorsey to be head coach and general manager.

In 2013, a trade made by Dorsey brought in former No. 1 overall pick Alex Smith. Around the same time, the Chiefs also released Matt Cassel. Alex Smith took the former 2-14 team and led them to a 9–0 start and an 11–5 record, as a strong defense and a decent offense led them to a playoff berth. Alex Smith also recorded 3,313 yards, twenty-three touchdowns, and only seven interceptions. However, the Chiefs were stunned as they lost in the Wildcard Round to the fourth seeded Indianapolis Colts 45-44 after leading by 38-10 early in the 3rd quarter.

The next season, the Chiefs put up a second straight winning season under the new Andy Reid/Alex Smith system, however their 9–7 record was not enough to make the playoffs. Alex Smith again finished with a similar season, putting up 3,265 yards, eighteen touchdowns, and six interceptions. In the following season, the Chiefs started with a 1–5 record, however improved quarterback play and defense led the Chiefs on an improbable 11-game winning streak, culminating with the team's first playoff win since 1993, where they beat the Houston Texans by a score of 30–0. The Chiefs, however, fell short of an AFC Championship Game bid as the Chiefs lost to the defending Super Bowl champion New England Patriots. Alex Smith recorded his career high in passing yards that season, however, with 3,486 yards, and also had twenty touchdowns and seven interceptions. In 2016, Alex Smith started his fourth straight season as Chiefs quarterback. He was injured in Week 8 against the Indianapolis Colts, however he only missed one game and backup quarterback Nick Foles led them to a 19–14 win over the Jacksonville Jaguars the following week. In Week 12, Alex Smith also led the Chiefs to a 30–27 overtime win against the defending Super Bowl champion Denver Broncos, and put the Chiefs at 8–3 on the season.

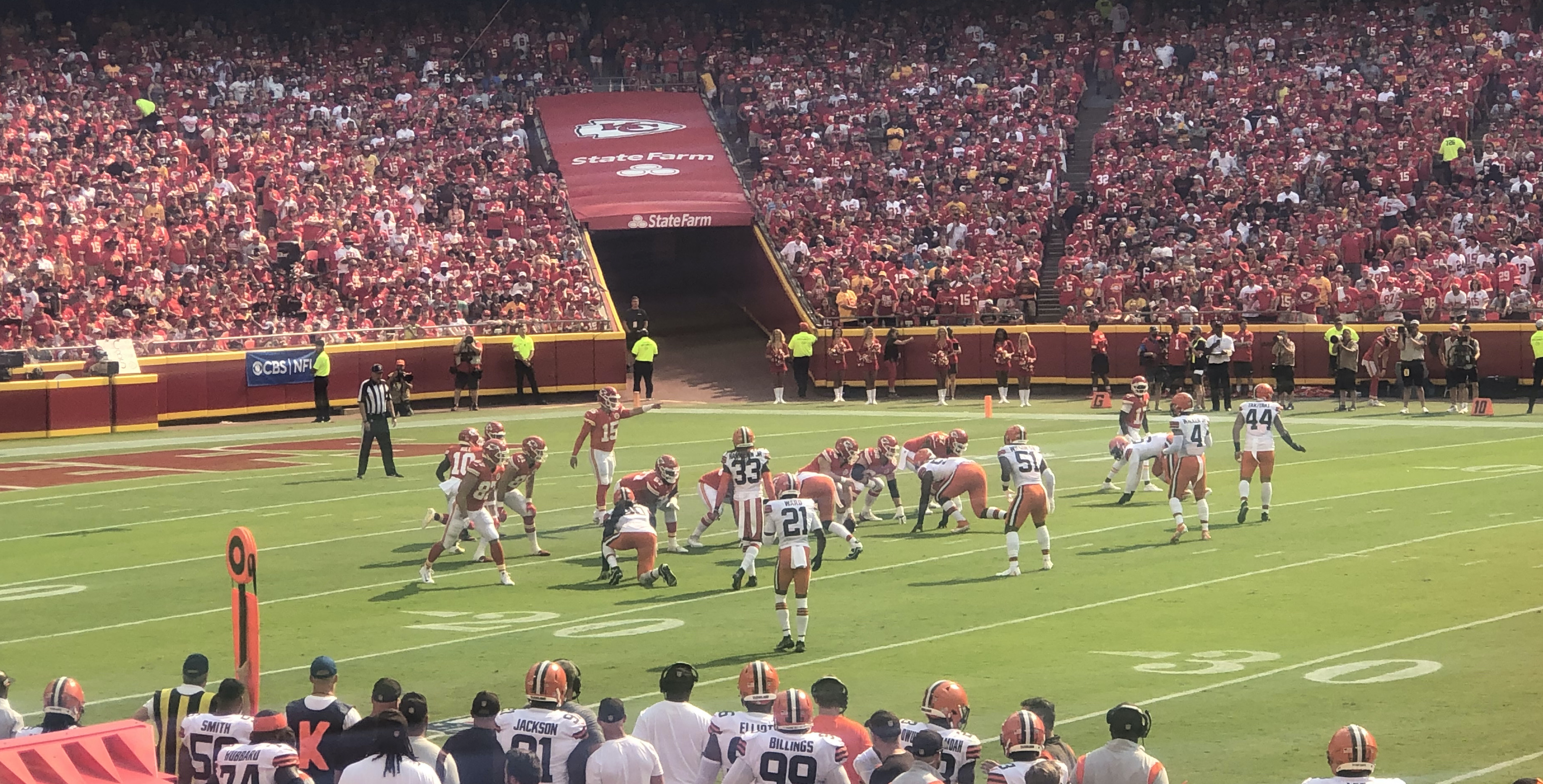
Patrick Mahomes leading the Chiefs offense against the Browns, 2021

In 2017, the Chiefs drafted Patrick Mahomes with the 10th selection in the draft. Mahomes spent almost all of that season as the backup to Smith, and on December 31, 2017, with the Chiefs' playoff seeding already secured and most of the starters resting until the following week's Wild Card Round matchup with the Tennessee Titans, Mahomes made his NFL debut as the starting QB, leading the Chiefs to a 27–24 victory over the Denver Broncos. The Chiefs traded Alex Smith to the Washington Redskins after the season and named Mahomes as the starting QB for 2018. Mahomes quickly showed off his talents on the field, setting an NFL record with 10 TD passes in his first 3 games and throwing for 300 yards in 8 of the first 9 games of the 2018 season. Mahomes ultimately finished the 2018 season with 5,097 passing yards and 50 touchdowns, becoming the youngest player since Dan Marino in 1984 to throw for that many yards, and the second player in NFL history, along with Peyton Manning, to throw for 5,000 passing yards and 50 touchdowns in the same season. For his performance, he was named the NFL MVP, and he also received several other awards and accolades.

=== Backup quarterbacks ===
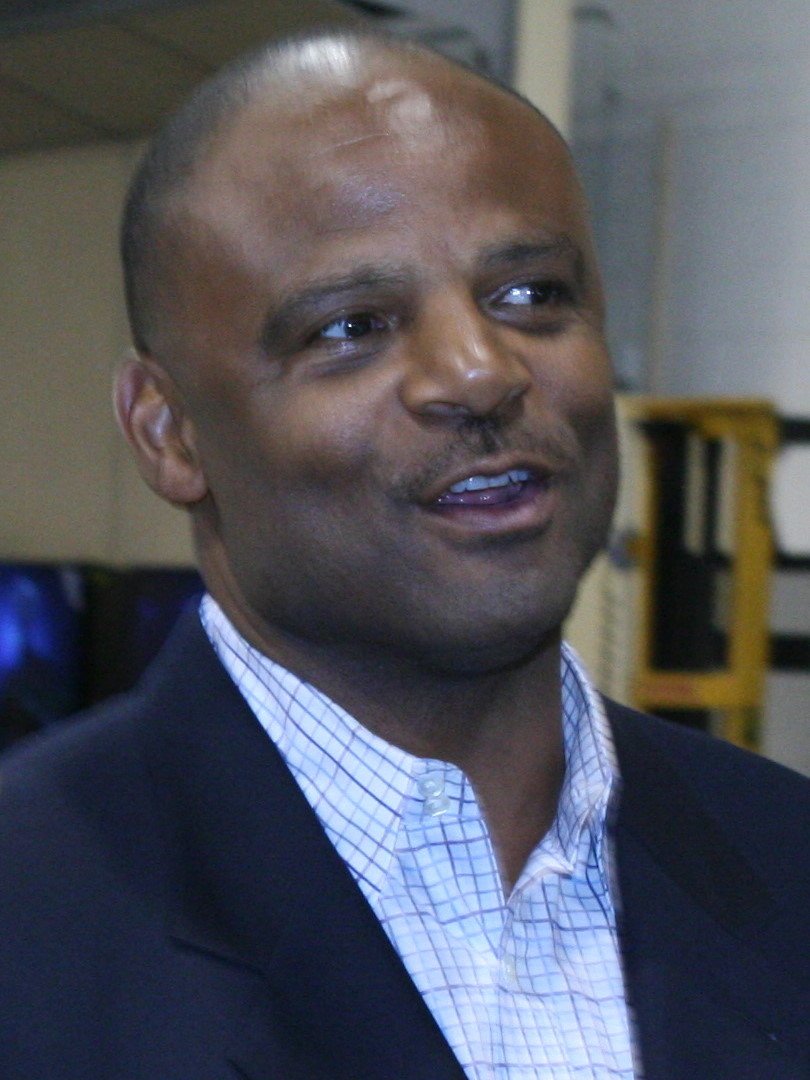
After Rich Gannon's departure, Warren Moon served as Elvis Grbac's backup. Moon started one game for Kansas City in the 2000 season.

Notable backup quarterbacks have also led the Chiefs to success after substituting for their starting quarterback, including Mike Livingston, Rich Gannon, and Damon Huard. When Len Dawson was injured during the Chiefs’ 1969 season, second-year quarterback Mike Livingston won all six of his starts in Dawson's absence. Dawson returned late in the season to lead the Chiefs on way to Super Bowl IV. Livingston, surrounded by a much weaker cast when he got another chance to start, never enjoyed much success again. Tom Flores was also on the Chiefs' 1969 team that won Super Bowl IV, but never played in a game for the Chiefs. He went on to coach the Oakland Raiders to two Super Bowl victories in the 1980s. Warren Moon was on the Chiefs' roster for the 1999 and 2000 seasons under Elvis Grbac and started one game in Grbac's absence. Moon was inducted into the Pro Football Hall of Fame in 2006. Ron Jaworski finished his career as a Chief in 1989, and started three games.

=== Quarterback controversies ===
==== Gannon and Grbac ====
A quarterback controversy began in the 1997 season when Elvis Grbac started the first nine games and suffered an injury, leading to Rich Gannon's substitution for the next six games. Grbac would return in the team's season finale. Gannon won five consecutive starts down the stretch to help the Chiefs earn home-field advantage with a 13–3 record. Grbac wasn't much of a leader, in fact he once made the comment "I can't catch the ball and throw it, too." although he was a talented thrower. Gannon was an aggressive leader who demanded the most of his players. Grbac was selected by coach Marty Schottenheimer to start the team's playoff game against the Denver Broncos, a game which the Chiefs would lose 14–10. Chiefs fans were deeply divided over whether Gannon or Grbac should lead the team, and Gannon backers were none too happy when he was let go and signed with the Raiders in 1999.

After joining the Raiders, Gannon knocked the Chiefs out of playoff contention in the 1999 season when the Raiders defeated the Chiefs by a score of 41–38 in overtime. Grbac was released by the Chiefs after the 2000 season and signed with the then-defending Super Bowl champion Baltimore Ravens. Grbac only lasted one season in Baltimore and retired in the offseason. In 2002, Gannon would be named the NFL's Most Valuable Player and led the Raiders to an appearance in Super Bowl XXXVII.

==== Quarterback instability under Herman Edwards (2006–2008) ====
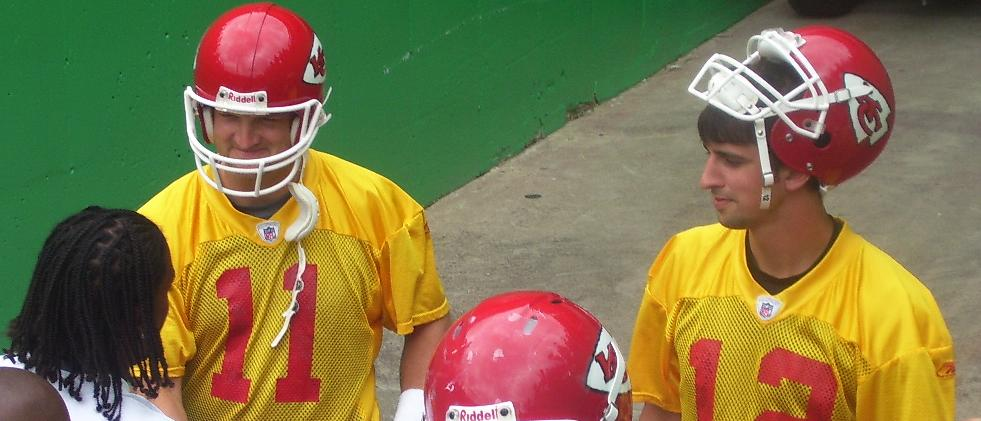
Damon Huard (left) and Brodie Croyle (right) at a Chiefs mini camp practice.

Trent Green had proven himself incredibly durable in his tenure with the Chiefs, and had started every game for the Chiefs since they acquired him in a 2001 trade. Green suffered a severe concussion in the 2006 season opener, when he was hit outside the pocket by Cincinnati Bengals defensive end Robert Geathers. The injury would sideline him for the next eight games. He considered retirement but said neurosurgeons and neurophysiologists told him he faced no increased risk of Alzheimer's disease or dementia if he resumed playing with the team. Damon Huard took over in Green's absence while Green recovered, and coach Herman Edwards stated that Green would reclaim the position when he got healthy. The situation with Huard was compared to the Gannon–Grbac controversy from seven years earlier. Until he replaced Green in week one, Huard had thrown one pass in a game since 2000 and started in six games. Huard played in ten games throwing 11 touchdown passes and only one interception for a quarterback rating of 98.0 with the Chiefs. The Chiefs went 5–3 in games with Huard starting, but when Trent Green reclaimed his starting job, he managed a 4–4 record and threw 7 touchdowns and 9 interceptions. When Green returned, the opinions of Chiefs fans were divided. Half wanted Damon Huard while others remained loyal to Green. Edwards eventually chose Green to start the team's playoff game against the Indianapolis Colts. Edwards had said that if Green struggled, he wouldn't hesitate to substitute Huard into the game:

You have to win the game...There's no tomorrow. And you have to do whatever is best for the football team at that point. I'll do whatever I have to do. When you're in the playoffs, you're desperate.

The Chiefs' offense stumbled in the 23–8 loss, and Green threw for 107 yards on 14-of-24 passing with two interceptions. Kansas City's initial first down came with 3:34 remaining in the third quarter, and managed 126 total yards on offense.

In late January, Chiefs general manager Carl Peterson told Green that he would have to restructure his contract to remain with the team and to brace for a lesser role on offense. Green was also granted permission to explore options of a trade. The February 2007 contract agreement with Huard, who would have been an unrestricted free agent, was the first public indication that Green's job was in danger. The first team to have contacted the Chiefs' front office about acquiring Green was the Miami Dolphins, but Miami disagreements prolonged trade talks. The Dolphins initially offered a seventh round draft pick to the Chiefs, but the Chiefs declined, instead seeking a second round pick in exchange for Green. The Detroit Lions and Cleveland Browns were also interested in Green, whom were both looking for a veteran quarterback. Green had told the Chiefs that Miami was his preference for a trade, being that he previously worked under both head coach Cam Cameron and longtime quarterbacks coach Terry Shea. On draft day, the Chiefs and Dolphins could not reach a trade agreement. Green voiced his frustration, and criticism was drawn to the Chiefs' apparent neglect to trade Green.

Green stated that he was being treated unfairly on and off the field and that the 2007 quarterback competition was "substantially weighted" towards Brodie Croyle, who was drafted in 2006. Green voiced his reluctance to be a backup to Croyle and Huard. Head coach Herman Edwards voiced his own displeasure with Green's outspoken comments and simply said that he was "trying to create competition." The changes had become apparent to Green, whom learned of the dismissal of quarterbacks coach Terry Shea from Croyle. He had also pointed out numerous occasions where Edwards had expressed the intention to start a younger quarterback to go along with the others in the AFC West. Green's agent had also said that the Dolphins were willing to be "flexible" in the trade negotiations, but the Chiefs organization were reportedly ignoring their calls in late May.

On June 5, the Chiefs agreed to trade Green to the Miami Dolphins for a conditional fifth round pick in the 2008 NFL draft. The pick could have been upgraded to a fourth-round selection if Green reached certain predetermined playing time and performance levels. A season-ending concussion sent Green to the disabled list, securing a fifth-round choice for the Chiefs.

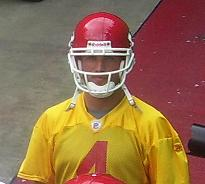
Tyler Thigpen was the third Chiefs quarterback to start a game in 2008.

On August 25, Huard was named the Chiefs' starting quarterback for the season opener against the Houston Texans. However, following an unproductive first half of the season Croyle was named the starter on November 12. Huard was injured in a game the previous day against the Denver Broncos, and Croyle filled in for the remainder of the game. Croyle started his first NFL regular season game against the Indianapolis Colts at the RCA Dome on November 18, 2007, but the Chiefs lost the game 13–10. The Chiefs finished the season losing 9 consecutive games (a club record) and ended with a 4–12 record, their worst in 30 years. Croyle started six of the last seven games for the Chiefs, losing all six.

In 2008, Croyle started the Chiefs' opening game against the New England Patriots, but suffered a shoulder injury. Huard played for the remainder of the game and started the team's Week 2 matchup against the Oakland Raiders. Huard was injured in the game and replaced by Tyler Thigpen. Thigpen was the third Chiefs starting quarterback in the 2008 season. The Chiefs prepared Croyle throughout their bye week in order to return in Week 7 against the Tennessee Titans. Croyle suffered a season-ending knee injury in the game, and when Huard substituted, he suffered a thumb injury leading to Thigpen finishing the game at quarterback. After the game, it was confirmed that both Croyle and Huard were placed on injured reserve, and Thigpen was announced as the starter against the Jets in Week 8. The Chiefs signed both Ingle Martin and Quinn Gray to replace both Croyle and Huard on the depth chart. Thigpen started the remaining ten games of the season, but the Chiefs finished with a franchise-worst 2–14 record and continued to lack stability at the QB position under head coach Herman Edwards.

== Franchise records ==
The following is a list of franchise records accomplished by Texans/Chiefs quarterbacks from 1960–2018.

=== Career ===
- Games started, total: Len Dawson, 158 (1962–1975).
- Games played, total: Len Dawson, 182 (1962–1975).
- Games started, consecutive: Trent Green, 81 (2001–2006).
- Passing yards: Len Dawson, 28,507 (1962–1975).
- Touchdown passes: Len Dawson, 237 (1962–1975).
- Most passes had intercepted: Len Dawson, 178 (1962–1975).
- Most consecutive games, touchdown passes: Patrick Mahomes, 31 (October 6, 2019 to October 17, 2021).
- Highest passer rating: Trent Green, 87.3 (2001–2006).
- Passing attempts: Len Dawson, 3,696 (1962–1975).
- Passing completions: Len Dawson, 2,115 (1962–1975).
- Passing completion percentage: Trent Green, 61.94 (2001–2006).
- Most 300-yard passing games: Trent Green, 24 (2001–2006).
- Regular season wins: Len Dawson, 94 (1962–1975).
- Times sacked (compiled since 1972): Bill Kenney, 195 (1980–1988).
- Longest pass completion: Trent Green to Marc Boerigter, 99 (December 12, 2002 vs. San Diego Chargers).
- Lowest percentage, passes had intercepted: Elvis Grbac, 3.04 (1,548-47) (1997–2000).

=== Season ===
- Touchdown passes: Patrick Mahomes, 50 (2018).
- Touchdown passes, rookie: Steve Fuller, 6 (1979).
- Yards gained:, Patrick Mahomes, 5,097 (2018).
- Yards gained, rookie: Steve Fuller, 1,484 (1979).
- Passes had intercepted: Trent Green, 24 (2001).
- Passes had intercepted, rookie: Steve Fuller, 14 (1979).
- Fumbles: Steve Fuller, 16 (1980).
- Times sacked (compiled since 1972): Steve Fuller, 49 (1980).
- Passing attempts: Bill Kenney, 603 (1983).
- Passing completions: Patrick Mahomes, 369 (2018).
- Most 300-yard passing games: Patrick Mahomes, 10 (2018).
- Most passing attempts, rookie: Steve Fuller, 270 (1979).
- Most passing completions, rookie: Steve Fuller, 146 (1979).

=== Game ===
- First quarterback to throw and catch a touchdown pass: Tyler Thigpen (November 2, 2008 vs. Tampa Bay Buccaneers).
- Youngest quarterback to start: Patrick Mahomes (December 31, 2017 vs. Denver Broncos).
- Oldest quarterback to start: Warren Moon, 44 (November 26, 2000 vs. San Diego Chargers).
- Touchdown passes: Two players tied– Len Dawson; Patrick Mahomes, 6 (November 1, 1964 vs. Denver Broncos; September 16, 2018 vs. Pittsburgh Steelers + November 19, 2018 vs. Los Angeles Rams).
- Highest passer rating: Trent Green, 158.3 (December 12, 2002 vs. Detroit Lions).
- Passes attempted: Two players tied–Joe Montana; Steve Bono, 55 (October 9, 1994 vs. San Diego Chargers; December 12, 1994 vs. Miami Dolphins).
- Passes attempted, no interceptions: Trent Green, 47 (December 7, 2003 vs. Denver Broncos).
- Passes completed: Elvis Grbac, 39 (November 5, 2000 vs. Oakland Raiders).
- Passes completed, consecutive: Len Dawson, 16 (September 9, 1967 vs. Houston Oilers).
- Yards gained: Elvis Grbac, 504 (November 5, 2000 vs. Oakland Raiders).
- Times sacked: Steve Fuller, 10 (November 2, 1980 vs. Baltimore Colts).
- Most passes had intercepted: Todd Blackledge, 6 (October 20, 1985 vs. Los Angeles Rams).

== See also ==
- List of Kansas City Chiefs starting quarterbacks
- List of Kansas City Chiefs players
