= 1995 Kansas City Chiefs season =

NFL team season

- Owner: Lamar Hunt
- General manager: Carl Peterson
- Head coach: Marty Schottenheimer
- Offensive coordinator: Paul Hackett
- Defensive coordinator: Gunther Cunningham
- Home stadium: Arrowhead Stadium

Results
- Record: 13–3
- Division place: 1st AFC West
- Playoffs: Lost Divisional Playoffs (vs. Colts) 7–10
- All-Pros: 3: DE Neil Smith (2nd team); CB Dale Carter (2nd team); P Louie Aguiar (2nd team)
- Pro Bowlers: 7: QB Steve Bono; FB Kimble Anders; G Will Shields; DE Neil Smith; DT Dan Saleaumua; LB Derrick Thomas; CB Dale Carter

The 1995 season was the Kansas City Chiefs' 26th in the National Football League (NFL), their 33rd in Kansas City and their 36th overall. The team improved on their 9–7 record from 1994 and finished the regular season with a 13–3 record and the AFC West division championship. However, the Chiefs suffered a devastating loss in the divisional round of the 1995–96 AFC playoffs when placekicker Lin Elliott missed three crucial field goals, allowing the Indianapolis Colts to win 10–7. Due to the retirement of Joe Montana, the Chiefs made a change at the quarterback position, by starting Steve Bono, who started two games in 1994 while Montana was injured.

== Offseason ==
Additions	Subtractions
QB Rich Gannon	QB Joe Montana (retirement)
WR Webster Slaughter (Oilers)	WR J. J. Birden (Falcons)
S Brian Washington (Jets)	T Derrick Graham (Panthers)
S Martin Bayless (Redskins)	S David Whitmore (Eagles)
T Jeff Criswell (Jets)	

=== 1995 expansion draft ===
Kansas City Chiefs selected during the expansion draft
Round	Overall	Name	Position	Expansion team
9	18	Greg Kragen	NT	Carolina Panthers
20	39	Monty Grow	DB	Jacksonville Jaguars

=== Draft ===
1995 Kansas City Chiefs draft
Round	Pick	Player	Position	College	Notes
1	31	Trezelle Jenkins	Offensive tackle	Michigan	
3	81	Tamarick Vanover	Wide receiver	Florida State	
3	97	Troy Dumas	Linebacker	Nebraska	
4	134	Steve Stenstrom	Quarterback	Stanford	
5	155	Mike Pelton	Defensive tackle	Auburn	
5	164	Jerrott Willard	Linebacker	California	
6	202	Bryan Proby	Defensive tackle	Arizona State	
6	207	Tom Barndt	Center	Pittsburgh	
Made roster

=== Undrafted free agents ===
1995 undrafted free agents of note
Player	Position	College
Ron Childs	Linebacker	Washington State
Ron Florine	Tackle	Central Missouri State
Gary Layton	Punter	Miami (OH)
Sean Scott	Wide receiver	Pittsburg State
J. J. Smith	Running back	Kansas State
Willy Tate	Tight end	Oregon
Robert Williams	Tight end	Valdosta State

== Personnel ==
=== Staff ===
1995 Kansas City Chiefs staff
Front office: Founder – Lamar Hunt; Chairman of the board – Jack Steadman; President/general manager/chief executive officer – Carl Peterson; Assistant general manager – Dennis Thum; Vice-president of player personnel – Lynn Stiles; Director of pro personnel – Mark Hatley; Director of college scouting – Terry Bradway; Head coaches: Head coach – Marty Schottenheimer; Assistant head coach/Wide Receivers – Al Saunders; Offensive coaches: Offensive coordinator – Paul Hackett; Quarterbacks – Mike McCarthy; Running backs – Jimmy Raye; Tight ends/offensive Assistant – Jim Erkenbeck; Offensive line – Art Shell; Offensive quality control – Jimmy Raye III	Defensive coaches: Defensive coordinator – Gunther Cunningham; Defensive line – Carl Hairston; Linebackers – John Bunting; Defensive backs – Kurt Schottenheimer; Defensive backs – Herman Edwards; Defensive assistant/Special Teams – Woodrow Lowe; Defensive assistant/quality control – Darvin Wallis; Special teams coaches: Special teams – Mike Stock; Assistant special teams – Woodrow Lowe; Strength and conditioning: Strength and conditioning – Dave Redding; Assistant Strength and Conditioning – Russ Ball

=== Roster ===
1995 Kansas City Chiefs roster
Quarterbacks (QB): 14 Matt Blundin; 13 Steve Bono; 12 Rich Gannon; Running backs (RB): 32 Marcus Allen; 38 Kimble Anders; 30 Donnell Bennett FB; 29 Greg Hill; 49 Tony Richardson FB; 22 J.J. Smith; 31 Leroy Thompson; Wide receivers (WR): 88 Victor Bailey; 84 Willie Davis; 80 Lake Dawson; 83 Danan Hughes; 81 Chris Penn; 85 Webster Slaughter; 87 Tamarick Vanover; Tight ends (TE): 89 Keith Cash; 82 Derrick Walker	Offensive linemen (OL): 76 John Alt T; 69 Jeff Criswell T; 61 Tim Grunhard C; 74 Trezelle Jenkins T; 68 Will Shields G; 66 Ricky Siglar T; 79 Dave Szott G; 73 Joe Valerio C; 72 Danny Villa; Defensive linemen (DL): 99 Vaughn Booker DE; 77 Pellom McDaniels DE; 92 Darren Mickell DE; 75 Joe Phillips DT; 67 Bryan Proby DE/DT; 97 Dan Saleaumua DT; 90 Neil Smith DE; 94 Keith Traylor NT	Linebackers (LB): 50 Anthony Davis OLB; 57 George Jamison OLB; 51 Greg Manusky MLB; 52 Tracy Rogers OLB; 54 Tracy Simien MLB; 58 Derrick Thomas OLB; Defensive backs (DB): 44 Darren Anderson CB; 21 Martin Bayless S; 34 Dale Carter CB; 23 Perry Carter CB; 25 Mark Collins FS/CB; 40 James Hasty CB; 25 Doug Terry SS; 48 Brian Washington SS; 35 William White S; Special teams (ST): 5 Louie Aguiar P; 2 Lin Elliott K	Practice squad: 56 Anthony Abrams LB; 71 Tom Barndt DT; 70 Ron Florine T; 64 Mu Tagoai G; 46 Willy Tate TE; Reserve: 96 Troy Dumas LB (IR); 59 Jaime Fields LB (IR); 15 Steve Matthews QB (NF-Inj.); 27 Jay Taylor CB (IR); 95 Jerrott Willard LB (NF-Inj.); 53 active, 4 inactive, 5 practice squad Rookies in italics

== Season summary ==
The season began promisingly on September 3 with a convincing 34–10 win over the Seattle Seahawks in Seattle. New Chiefs quarterback Steve Bono passed for 3,121 yards and 21 touchdowns. Fullback Kimble Anders led the team in pass receptions with 55.

In Week Two, the Chiefs battled back from a two-touchdown deficit to defeat the New York Giants in overtime, 20–17 on September 10. A costly interception, penalties, and struggles on third down all led to a 17–3 Giants lead. The Chiefs didn't score a touchdown until 5:03 remained in the game. On the Chiefs' following possession, Bono completed to Danan Hughes with the game-tying score after a 67-yard, 14-play drive that took just 2 minutes and 32 seconds. Lin Elliott booted the game-winning field goal with 7:11 remaining in overtime to give the Chiefs the win. Marcus Allen led the Chiefs with 86 yards rushing and Bono passed for 187 yards.

The win improved the Chiefs record to 2–0. This was the first of three overtime wins for Kansas City at Arrowhead Stadium during the 1995 season, and it set the tone for the team's ability to win tight, close games throughout the regular season.

On September 17, James Hasty picked off a Jeff Hostetler pass and returned it for a touchdown in overtime as the Chiefs beat the Oakland Raiders, 23–17 to go 3–0. The defense would play a key role in Kansas City's success. The team held its opponents to a league-best 241 points and recorded a third-best 47 sacks. Cornerback Dale Carter led the team with 4 interceptions. Rookie kick returner Tamarick Vanover was also spectacular, returning two kickoffs and one punt for scores. Linebacker Derrick Thomas and defensive ends Neil Smith and Dan Saleaumua also shined for the Chiefs' defense.

On October 1, Quarterback Steve Bono ran for a 76-yard bootleg touchdown, accumulating more than 20% of his total career rushing yards in 1 play. The Chiefs won over the Cardinals 24–3.

On October 9, Tamarick Vanover returned a punt 86 yards in overtime to give the Chiefs a 29–23 victory over the San Diego Chargers on Monday Night Football. It was the Chiefs' third overtime win at Arrowhead Stadium during the 1995 season, and was the first time in NFL history that an overtime game had been won on a punt return for a touchdown.

On October 22, the Chiefs beat the Denver Broncos at Mile High Stadium, 21–7. Marcus Allen was again a standout for the offense, gaining 890 yards rushing and scoring 5 touchdowns for the season.

On November 19, the Chiefs won their seventh game in a row, beating the Houston Oilers 20–13 at Arrowhead Stadium, to go 10–1.

On December 24, Tamarick Vanover ran the opening kickoff 89 yards for a touchdown, and the Chiefs defeated the Seahawks, 26–3. They won the AFC West title and finished the regular season with a 13–3 record.

== Preseason ==
Week	Date	Opponent	Result	Record	Venue	Attendance	Recap
1	August 5	Washington Redskins	W 37–21	1–0	Arrowhead Stadium	70,807	Recap
2	August 11	at Arizona Cardinals	L 17–22	1–1	Sun Devil Stadium	44,690	Recap
3	August 19	Buffalo Bills	W 36–10	2–1	Arrowhead Stadium	76,299	Recap
4	August 26	at Minnesota Vikings	W 17–13	3–1	Hubert H. Humphrey Metrodome	39,349	Recap

== Regular season ==
=== Schedule ===
Week	Date	Opponent	Result	Record	Venue	Attendance	Recap
1	September 3	at **Seattle Seahawks**	**W** 34–10	1–0	Kingdome	47,562	Recap
2	September 10	New York Giants	**W** 20–17 (OT)	2–0	Arrowhead Stadium	77,964	Recap
3	September 17	**Oakland Raiders**	**W** 23–17 (OT)	3–0	Arrowhead Stadium	78,696	Recap
4	September 24	at Cleveland Browns	**L** 17–35	3–1	Cleveland Stadium	74,280	Recap
5	October 1	at Arizona Cardinals	**W** 24–3	4–1	Sun Devil Stadium	50,211	Recap
6	October 9	**San Diego Chargers**	**W** 29–23 (OT)	5–1	Arrowhead Stadium	79,288	Recap
7	October 15	New England Patriots	**W** 31–26	6–1	Arrowhead Stadium	77,992	Recap
8	October 22	at **Denver Broncos**	**W** 21–7	7–1	Mile High Stadium	71,044	Recap
9	Bye						
10	November 5	Washington Redskins	**W** 24–3	8–1	Arrowhead Stadium	77,821	Recap
11	November 12	at **San Diego Chargers**	**W** 22–7	9–1	Jack Murphy Stadium	59,285	Recap
12	November 19	Houston Oilers	**W** 20–13	10–1	Arrowhead Stadium	77,576	Recap
13	November 23	at Dallas Cowboys	**L** 12–24	10–2	Texas Stadium	64,901	Recap
14	December 3	at **Oakland Raiders**	**W** 29–23	11–2	Oakland–Alameda County Coliseum	53,930	Recap
15	December 11	at Miami Dolphins	**L** 6–13	11–3	Joe Robbie Stadium	70,321	Recap
16	December 17	**Denver Broncos**	**W** 20–17	12–3	Arrowhead Stadium	75,061	Recap
17	December 24	**Seattle Seahawks**	**W** 26–3	13–3	Arrowhead Stadium	75,784	Recap
Note: Intra-division opponents are in **bold** text.

=== Game summaries ===
==== Week 1: at Seattle Seahawks ====
Week 1: Kansas City Chiefs at Seattle Seahawks – Game summary

Quarter	1	2	3	4	Total
**Chiefs**	7	13	14	0	**34**
Seahawks	3	0	0	7	**10**

at Kingdome, Seattle, Washington

- Date: September 3
- Game time: 3:00 p.m. CDT/1:00 p.m. PDT
- Game weather: None (indoor stadium)
- Game attendance: 47,564
- Referee: Howard Roe
- TV announcers (NBC): Jim Lampley and Bob Golic
- Recap, Game Book

Game information

**First quarter**

- SEA – Todd Peterson 49-yard field goal, 10:56. Seahawks 3–0. **Drive: 9 plays, 37 yards, 4:04.**
- KC – Willie Davis 60-yard pass from Steve Bono (Lin Elliott kick), 4:00. Chiefs 7–3. **Drive: 2 plays, 63 yards, 0:41.**

**Second quarter**

- KC – Lin Elliott 46-yard field goal, 10:25. Chiefs 10–3. **Drive: 12 plays, 62 yards, 6:23.**
- KC – Willie Davis 40-yard pass from Steve Bono (Lin Elliott kick), 6:40. Chiefs 17–3. **Drive: 5 plays, 68 yards, 1:54.**
- KC – Lin Elliott 49-yard field goal, 0:00. Chiefs 20–3. **Drive: 2 plays, 17 yards, 0:09.**

**Third quarter**

- KC – Tamarick Vanover 99-yard kickoff return (Lin Elliott kick), 14:43. Chiefs 27–3.
- KC – Lake Dawson 16-yard pass from Steve Bono (Lin Elliott kick), 6:18. Chiefs 34–3. **Drive: 9 plays, 76 yards, 5:14.**

**Fourth quarter**

- SEA – Brian Blades 21-yard pass from John Friesz (Todd Peterson kick), 2:52. Chiefs 34–10. **Drive: 9 plays, 77 yards, 2:23.**

**Top passers**

- KC – Steve Bono – 18/23, 278 yards, 3 TD
- SEA – Rick Mirer – 19/37, 209 yards, INT

**Top rushers**

- KC – Greg Hill – 15 rushes, 109 yards
- SEA – Chris Warren – 14 rushes, 56 yards

**Top receivers**

- KC – Willie Davis – 6 receptions, 155 yards, 2 TD
- SEA – Brian Blades – 8 receptions, 107 yards, TD

==== Week 2: vs. New York Giants ====
Week 2: New York Giants at Kansas City Chiefs – Game summary

Quarter	1	2	3	4	OT	Total
Giants	7	3	0	7	0	**17**
**Chiefs**	3	0	0	14	3	**20**

at Arrowhead Stadium, Kansas City, Missouri

- Date: September 10
- Game time: 12:00 p.m. CDT
- Game weather: Clear, 73 °F (23 °C)
- Game attendance: 77,962
- Referee: Bernie Kukar
- TV announcers (Fox): Pat Summerall and John Madden
- Recap, Game Book

Game information

**First quarter**

- NYG – Chris Calloway 26-yard pass from Dave Brown (Brad Daluiso kick), 12:05. Giants 7–0. **Drive: 5 plays, 75 yards, 2:55.**
- KC – Lin Elliott 42-yard field goal, 5:24. Giants 7–3. **Drive: 7 plays, 25 yards, 2:25.**

**Second quarter**

- NYG – Brad Daluiso 23-yard field goal, 14:37. Giants 10–3. **Drive: 12 plays, 72 yards, 5:47.**

**Third quarter**

- No scoring plays.

**Fourth quarter**

- NYG – Tito Wooten 1-yard fumble return (Brad Daluiso kick), 10:56. Giants 17–3.
- KC – Marcus Allen 1-yard run (Lin Elliott kick), 5:03. Giants 17–10. **Drive: 9 plays, 73 yards, 5:53.**
- KC – Danan Hughes 3-yard pass from Steve Bono (Lin Elliott kick), 1:22. Tied 17–17. **Drive: 14 plays, 67 yards, 2:32.**

**Overtime**

- KC – Lin Elliott 23-yard field goal, 7:11. Chiefs 20–17. **Drive: 7 plays, 35 yards, 3;40.**

**Top passers**

- NYG – Dave Brown – 10/14, 151 yards, TD
- KC – Steve Bono – 29/47, 183 yards, TD, INT

**Top rushers**

- NYG – Rodney Hampton – 26 rushes, 79 yards
- KC – Marcus Allen – 19 rushes, 86 yards, TD

**Top receivers**

- NYG – Chris Calloway – 5 receptions, 100 yards, TD
- KC – Kimble Anders – 11 receptions, 68 yards

==== Week 3: vs. Oakland Raiders ====
Week 3: Oakland Raiders at Kansas City Chiefs – Game summary

Quarter	1	2	3	4	OT	Total
Raiders	0	14	3	0	0	**17**
**Chiefs**	7	0	0	10	6	**23**

at Arrowhead Stadium, Kansas City, Missouri

- Date: September 17
- Game time: 12:00 p.m. CDT
- Game weather: Clear, 71 °F (22 °C)
- Game attendance: 78,696
- Referee: Gary Lane
- TV announcers (NBC): Marv Albert and Cris Collinsworth
- Recap, Game Book

Game information

**First quarter**

- KC – Lake Dawson 4-yard pass from Steve Bono (Lin Elliott kick), 11:00. Chiefs 7–0. **Drive: 3 plays, 11 yards, 1:09.**

**Second quarter**

- OAK – Harvey Williams 1-yard run (Cole Ford kick), 14:00. Tied 7–7. **Drive: 6 plays, 46 yards, 2:19.**
- OAK – Harvey Williams 1-yard run (Cole Ford kick), 0:27. Raiders 14–7. **Drive: 7 plays, 33 yards, 3:13.**

**Third quarter**

- OAK – Cole Ford 33-yard field goal, 6:50. Raiders 17–7. **Drive: 9 plays, 67 yards, 4:00.**

**Fourth quarter**

- KC – Willie Davis 19-yard pass from Steve Bono (Lin Elliott kick), 13:32. Raiders 17–14. **Drive: 6 plays, 72 yards, 3:10.**
- KC – Lin Elliott 35-yard field goal, 7:57. Tied 17–17. **Drive: 8 plays, 57 yards, 4:09.**

**Overtime**

- KC – James Hasty 64-yard interception return, 10:33. Chiefs 23–17.

**Top passers**

- OAK – Jeff Hostetler – 19/30, 203 yards, 2 INT
- KC – Steve Bono – 19/28, 164 yards, 2 TD

**Top rushers**

- OAK – Harvey Williams – 20 rushes, 74 yards, 2 TD
- KC – Marcus Allen – 17 rushes, 53 yards

**Top receivers**

- OAK – Tim Brown – 7 receptions, 72 yards
- KC – Marcus Allen – 4 receptions, 37 yards

==== Week 4: at Cleveland Browns ====
Week 4: Kansas City Chiefs at Cleveland Browns – Game summary

Quarter	1	2	3	4	Total
Chiefs	0	3	0	14	**17**
**Browns**	7	0	7	21	**35**

at Cleveland Municipal Stadium, Cleveland, Ohio

- Date: September 24
- Game time: 4:00 p.m. EDT/3:00 p.m. CDT
- Game weather: Sunny and cool, 58 °F (14 °C)
- Game attendance: 74,280
- Referee: Jerry Markbreit
- TV announcers (NBC): Jim Lampley, Bob Golic and Will McDonough
- Recap, Game Book

Game information

**First quarter**

- CLE – Earnest Byner 7-yard run (Matt Stover kick), 0:29. Browns 7–0. **Drive: 14 plays, 74 yards, 7:31.**

**Second quarter**

- KC – Lin Elliott 25-yard field goal, 0:38. Browns 7–3. **Drive: 5 plays, 17 yards, 1:31.**

**Third quarter**

- CLE – Andre Rison 4-yard pass from Vinny Testaverde (Matt Stover kick), 8:16. Browns 14–3. **Drive: 8 plays, 61 yards, 3:10.**

**Fourth quarter**

- CLE – Earnest Byner 3-yard pass from Vinny Testaverde (Matt Stover kick), 10:26. Browns 21–3. **Drive: 11 plays, 80 yards, 6:12.**
- KC – Keith Cash 38-yard pass from Steve Bono (Lin Elliott kick), 8:01. Browns 21–10. **Drive: 7 plays, 66 yards, 2:25.**
- CLE – Gerald Dixon 18-yard interception return (Matt Stover kick), 4:45. Browns 28–10.
- CLE – Mike Caldwell 24-yard interception return (Matt Stover kick), 4:26. Browns 35–10.
- KC – Webster Slaughter 2-yard pass from Steve Bono (Lin Elliott kick), 0:14. Browns 35–17. **Drive: 10 plays, 71 yards, 1:37.**

**Top passers**

- KC – Steve Bono – 29/49, 272 yards, 2 TD, 2 INT
- CLE – Vinny Testaverde – 21/36, 204 yards, 2 TD

**Top rushers**

- KC – Kimble Anders – 2 rushes, 21 yards
- CLE – Leroy Hoard – 13 rushes, 50 yards

**Top receivers**

- KC – Keith Cash – 8 receptions, 111 yards, TD
- CLE – Earnest Byner – 7 receptions, 59 yards, TD

==== Week 5: at Arizona Cardinals ====
Week 5: Kansas City Chiefs at Arizona Cardinals – Game summary

Quarter	1	2	3	4	Total
**Chiefs**	0	14	10	0	**24**
Cardinals	0	0	0	3	**3**

at Sun Devil Stadium, Tempe, Arizona

- Date: October 1
- Game time: 3:00 p.m. CDT/1:00 p.m. MST
- Game weather: 85 °F (29 °C)
- Game attendance: 50,211
- Referee: Ron Blum
- TV announcers (NBC): Don Criqui and Beasley Reece
- Recap, Game Book

Game information

**First quarter**

- No scoring plays.

**Second quarter**

- KC – Steve Bono 76-yard run (Lin Elliott kick), 14:47. Chiefs 7–0. **Drive: 3 plays, 85 yards, 1:26.**
- KC – Joe Valerio 1-yard pass from Steve Bono (Lin Elliott kick), 7:05. Chiefs 14–0. **Drive: 4 plays, 15 yards, 2:26.**

**Third quarter**

- KC – Lake Dawson 14-yard pass from Steve Bono (Lin Elliott kick), 10:42. Chiefs 21–0. **Drive: 9 plays, 89 yards, 4:18.**
- KC – Lin Elliott 28-yard field goal, 3:39. Chiefs 24–0. **Drive: 8 plays, 63 yards, 4:06.**

**Fourth quarter**

- ARI – Greg Davis 48-yard field goal, 14:23. Chiefs 24–3. **Drive: 11 plays, 40 yards, 4:16.**

**Top passers**

- KC – Steve Bono – 7/17, 78 yards, 2 TD, INT
- ARI – Dave Krieg – 25/41, 308 yards, INT

**Top rushers**

- KC – Marcus Allen – 11 rushes, 62 yards
- ARI – Garrison Hearst – 15 rushes, 54 yards

**Top receivers**

- KC – Lake Dawson – 2 receptions, 29 yards, TD
- ARI – Frank Sanders – 4 receptions, 97 yards

==== Week 6: vs. San Diego Chargers ====
Week 6: San Diego Chargers at Kansas City Chiefs – Game summary

Quarter	1	2	3	4	OT	Total
Chargers	3	10	0	10	0	**23**
**Chiefs**	0	13	0	10	6	**29**

at Arrowhead Stadium, Kansas City, Missouri

- Date: October 9
- Game time: 8:00 p.m. CDT
- Game weather: Clear, 68 °F (20 °C)
- Game attendance: 79,288
- Referee: Howard Roe
- TV announcers (ABC): Al Michaels, Frank Gifford, Dan Dierdorf and Lynn Swann
- Recap, Game Book

Game information

**First quarter**

- SD – John Carney 28-yard field goal, 5:49. Chargers 3–0. **Drive: 19 plays, 63 yards, 9:11.**

**Second quarter**

- KC – Lin Elliott 21-yard field goal, 13:24. Tied 3–3. **Drive: 14 plays, 67 yards, 7:25.**
- SD – Natrone Means 2-yard run (John Carney kick), 11:24. Chargers 10–3. **Drive: 4 plays, 37 yards, 2:00.**
- KC – Lin Elliott 28-yard field goal, 5:23. Chargers 10–6. **Drive: 13 plays, 63 yards, 6:01.**
- KC – Kimble Anders 2-yard pass from Steve Bono (Lin Elliott kick), 3:53. Chiefs 13–10. **Drive: 3 plays, 22 yards, 1:30.**
- SD – John Carney 36-yard field goal, 0:02. Tied 13–13. **Drive: 8 plays, 52 yards, 0:41.**

**Third quarter**

- No scoring plays.

**Fourth quarter**

- KC – Lin Elliott 49-yard field goal, 12:19. Chiefs 16–13. **Drive: 11 plays, 54 yards, 4:51.**
- SD – Shannon Mitchell 4-yard pass from Stan Humphries (John Carney kick), 6:50. Chargers 20–16. **Drive: 10 plays, 73 yards, 5:29.**
- SD – John Carney 29-yard field goal, 1:12. Chargers 23–16. **Drive: 9 plays, 60 yards, 3:26.**
- KC – Derrick Walker 18-yard pass from Steve Bono (Lin Elliott kick), 0:15. Tied 23–23. **Drive: 8 plays, 79 yards, 0:57.**

**Overtime**

- KC – Tamarick Vanover 86-yard punt return, 7:33. Chiefs 29–23.

**Top passers**

- SD – Stan Humphries – 24/34, 315 yards, TD
- KC – Steve Bono – 27/41, 329 yards, 2 TD

**Top rushers**

- SD – Natrone Means – 24 rushes, 33 yards, TD
- KC – Marcus Allen – 14 rushes, 26 yards

**Top receivers**

- SD – Tony Martin – 7 receptions, 88 yards
- KC – Webster Slaughter – 3 receptions, 90 yards

==== Week 7: vs. New England Patriots ====
Week 7: New England Patriots at Kansas City Chiefs – Game summary

Quarter	1	2	3	4	Total
Patriots	7	3	9	7	**26**
**Chiefs**	3	21	0	7	**31**

at Arrowhead Stadium, Kansas City, Missouri

- Date: October 15
- Game time: 12:00 p.m. CDT
- Game weather: Clear, 68 °F (20 °C)
- Game attendance: 77,992
- Referee: Ed Hochuli
- TV announcers (NBC): Dick Enberg, Paul Maguire and Phil Simms
- Recap, Game Book

Game information

**First quarter**

- KC – Lin Elliott 27-yard field goal, 10:46. Chiefs 3–0. **Drive: 9 plays, 53 yards, 4:14.**
- NE – Dave Meggett 16-yard run (Matt Bahr kick), 6:39. Patriots 7–3. **Drive: 4 plays, 39 yards, 1:31.**

**Second quarter**

- KC – Steve Bono 2-yard run (Lin Elliott kick), 14:17. Chiefs 10–7. **Drive: 5 plays, 35 yards, 2:36.**
- NE – Matt Bahr 29-yard field goal, 9:01. Tied 10–10. **Drive: 11 plays, 53 yards, 5:16.**
- KC – Willie Davis 18-yard pass from Steve Bono (Lin Elliott kick), 5:22. Chiefs 17–10. **Drive: 9 plays, 71 yards, 3:39.**
- KC – Tamarick Vanover 26-yard pass from Steve Bono (Lin Elliott kick), 3:08. Chiefs 24–10. **Drive: 2 plays, 29 yards, 0:42.**

**Third quarter**

- NE – Matt Bahr 20-yard field goal, 10:00. Chiefs 24–13. **Drive: 14 plays, 77 yards, 5:00.**
- NE – Vincent Brisby 22-yard pass from Drew Bledsoe (run failed), 4:50. Chiefs 24–19. **Drive: 10 plays, 80 yards, 3:56.**

**Fourth quarter**

- KC – Greg Hill 9-yard run (Lin Elliott kick), 6:46. Chiefs 31–19. **Drive: 10 plays, 46 yards, 3:25.**
- NE – Will Moore 6-yard pass from Drew Bledsoe (Matt Bahr kick), 2:07. Chiefs 31–26. **Drive: 8 plays, 80 yards, 1:41.**

**Top passers**

- NE – Drew Bledsoe – 25/47, 237 yards, 2 TD, INT
- KC – Steve Bono – 16/40, 209 yards, 2 TD

**Top rushers**

- NE – Dave Meggett – 7 rushes, 63 yards, TD
- KC – Greg Hill – 15 rushes, 83 yards, TD

**Top receivers**

- NE – Will Moore – 7 receptions, 65 yards, TD
- KC – Willie Davis – 2 receptions, 52 yards, TD

==== Week 8: at Denver Broncos ====
Week 8: Kansas City Chiefs at Denver Broncos – Game summary

Quarter	1	2	3	4	Total
**Chiefs**	7	7	7	0	**21**
Broncos	7	0	0	0	**7**

at Mile High Stadium, Denver, Colorado

- Date: October 22
- Game time: 3:00 p.m. CDT/2:00 p.m. MDT
- Game weather: Cloudy/light snow, 34 °F (1 °C)
- Game attendance: 71,044
- Referee: Red Cashion
- TV announcers (NBC): Dick Enberg, Paul Maguire and Phil Simms
- Recap, Game Book

Game information

**First quarter**

- DEN – Shannon Sharpe 10-yard pass from John Elway (Jason Elam kick), 5:44. Broncos 7–0. **Drive: 7 plays, 30 yards, 3:18.**
- KC – Steve Bono 1-yard run (Lin Elliott kick), 3:31. Tied 7–7. **Drive: 6 plays, 34 yards, 2:13.**

**Second quarter**

- KC – Lake Dawson 14-yard pass from Steve Bono (Lin Elliott kick), 2:45. Chiefs 14–7. **Drive: 4 plays, 30 yards, 2:20.**

**Third quarter**

- KC – Marcus Allen 1-yard run (Lin Elliott kick), 9:20. Chiefs 21–7. **Drive: 12 plays, 52 yards, 5:40.**

**Fourth quarter**

- No scoring plays.

**Top passers**

- KC – Steve Bono – 15/28, 164 yards, TD
- DEN – John Elway – 21/40, 214 yards, TD, 2 INT

**Top rushers**

- KC – Marcus Allen – 21 rushes, 121 yards, TD
- DEN – Terrell Davis – 18 rushes, 69 yards

**Top receivers**

- KC – Tamarick Vanover – 1 reception, 57 yards
- DEN – Anthony Miller – 5 receptions, 73 yards

==== Week 10: vs. Washington Redskins ====
Week 10: Washington Redskins at Kansas City Chiefs – Game summary

Quarter	1	2	3	4	Total
Redskins	0	3	0	0	**3**
**Chiefs**	7	10	0	7	**24**

at Arrowhead Stadium, Kansas City, Missouri

- Date: November 5
- Game time: 12:00 p.m. CST
- Game weather: 54 °F (12 °C)
- Game attendance: 77,821
- Referee: Walt Coleman
- TV announcers (Fox): Kevin Harlan and Jerry Glanville
- Recap

Game information

**First quarter**

- KC – Marcus Allen 1-yard run (Lin Elliott kick), 7:26. Chiefs 7–0. **Drive: 10 plays, 50 yards, 4:38.**

**Second quarter**

- KC – Willie Davis 19-yard pass from Steve Bono (Lin Elliott kick), 11:52. Chiefs 14–0. **Drive: 10 plays, 61 yards, 4:07.**
- WAS – Eddie Murray 29-yard field goal, 5:28. Chiefs 14–3. **Drive: 7 plays, 48 yards, 2:12.**
- KC – Lin Elliott 38-yard field goal, 0:01. Chiefs 17–3. **Drive: 9 plays, 55 yards, 1:48.**

**Third quarter**

- No scoring plays.

**Fourth quarter**

- KC – Kimble Anders 40-yard run (Lin Elliott kick), 2:26. Chiefs 24–3. **Drive: 7 plays, 52 yards, 3:39.**

**Top passers**

- WAS – Gus Frerotte – 11/34, 140 yards
- KC – Steve Bono – 21/37, 201 yards, TD, INT

**Top rushers**

- WAS – Terry Allen – 14 rushes, 69 yards
- KC – Kimble Anders – 5 rushes, 75 yards, TD

**Top receivers**

- WAS – Jamie Asher – 3 receptions, 42 yards
- KC – Keith Cash – 5 receptions, 48 yards

==== Week 11: at San Diego Chargers ====
Week 11: Kansas City Chiefs at San Diego Chargers – Game summary

Quarter	1	2	3	4	Total
**Chiefs**	7	6	6	3	**22**
Chargers	7	0	0	0	**7**

at Jack Murphy Stadium, San Diego, California

- Date: November 12
- Game time: 3:00 p.m. CST/1:00 p.m. PST
- Game weather: Clear and sunny, 69 °F (21 °C)
- Game attendance: 59,285
- Referee: Gordon McCarter
- TV announcers (NBC): Charlie Jones and Randy Cross
- Recap, Game Book

Game information

**First quarter**

- KC – Steve Bono 2-yard run (Lin Elliott kick), 6:51. Chiefs 7–0. **Drive: 9 plays, 59 yards, 4:23.**
- SD – Rodney Culver 1-yard run (John Carney kick), 3:27. Tied 7–7. **Drive: 8 plays, 80 yards, 3:24.**

**Second quarter**

- KC – Lin Elliott 47-yard field goal, 12:13. Chiefs 10–7. **Drive: 4 plays, 6 yards, 1:28.**
- KC – Lin Elliott 48-yard field goal, 3:17. Chiefs 13–7. **Drive: 9 plays, 23 yards, 3:57.**

**Third quarter**

- KC – Marcus Allen 1-yard run (pass failed), 6:16. Chiefs 19–7. **Drive: 12 plays, 82 yards, 5:44.**

**Fourth quarter**

- KC – Lin Elliott 34-yard field goal, 3:58. Chiefs 22–7. **Drive: 12 plays, 61 yards, 5:52.**

**Top passers**

- KC – Steve Bono – 17/27, 137 yards, INT
- SD – Stan Humphries – 21/42, 244 yards

**Top rushers**

- KC – Greg Hill – 17 rushes, 78 yards
- SD – Rodney Culver – 11 rushes, 34 yards, TD

**Top receivers**

- KC – Lake Dawson – 3 receptions, 30 yards
- SD – Ronnie Harmon – 6 receptions, 96 yards

==== Week 12: vs. Houston Oilers ====
Week 12: Houston Oilers at Kansas City Chiefs – Game summary

Quarter	1	2	3	4	Total
Oilers	0	6	0	7	**13**
**Chiefs**	3	7	0	10	**20**

at Arrowhead Stadium, Kansas City, Missouri

- Date: November 19
- Game time: 7:00 p.m. CST
- Game weather: Clear, 63 °F (17 °C)
- Game attendance: 77,576
- Referee: Tom White
- TV announcers (ESPN): Mike Patrick, Joe Theismann and Mark Malone
- Recap, Game Book

Game information

**First quarter**

- KC – Lin Elliott 47-yard field goal, 3:11. Chiefs 3–0. **Drive: 4 plays, 3 yards, 1:39.**

**Second quarter**

- KC – Webster Slaughter 3-yard pass from Steve Bono (Lin Elliott kick), 14:55. Chiefs 10–0. **Drive: 3 plays, 9 yards, 1:28.**
- HOU – Chris Sanders 1-yard pass from Chris Chandler (pass failed), 0:26. Chiefs 10–6. **Drive: 10 plays, 55 yards, 4:36.**

**Third quarter**

- No scoring plays.

**Fourth quarter**

- KC – Lin Elliott 21-yard field goal, 8:15. Chiefs 13–6. **Drive: 10 plays, 34 yards, 4:02.**
- HOU – Chris Sanders 40-yard pass from Chris Chandler (Al Del Greco kick), 1:46. Tied 13–13. **Drive: 9 plays, 65 yards, 2:56.**
- KC – Mark Collins 34-yard fumble return (Lin Elliott kick), 0:15. Chiefs 20–13.

**Top passers**

- HOU – Chris Chandler – 19/38, 189 yards, 2 TD, 3 INT
- KC – Steve Bono – 13/30, 122 yards, TD, INT

**Top rushers**

- HOU – Rodney Thomas – 25 rushes, 58 yards
- KC – Marcus Allen – 16 rushes, 49 yards

**Top receivers**

- HOU – Chris Sanders – 4 receptions, 60 yards, 2 TD
- KC – Webster Slaughter – 3 receptions, 30 yards, TD

==== Week 13: at Dallas Cowboys ====
Thanksgiving Day games

Week 13: Kansas City Chiefs at Dallas Cowboys – Game summary

Quarter	1	2	3	4	Total
Chiefs	0	6	6	0	**12**
**Cowboys**	14	0	7	3	**24**

at Texas Stadium, Irving, Texas

- Date: November 23
- Game time: 3:00 p.m. CST
- Game weather: Partly cloudy, 66 °F (19 °C)
- Game attendance: 64,901
- Referee: Gerry Austin
- TV announcers (NBC): Dick Enberg, Paul Maguire, Phil Simms and Jim Gray
- Recap, Game Book

Game information

**First quarter**

- DAL – Emmitt Smith 15-yard run (Chris Boniol kick), 8:41. Cowboys 7–0. **Drive: 11 plays, 70 yards, 6:19.**
- DAL – Michael Irvin 33-yard pass from Troy Aikman (Chris Boniol kick), 0:29. Cowboys 14–0. **Drive: 11 plays, 75 yards, 6:35.**

**Second quarter**

- KC – Lin Elliott 34-yard field goal, 1:50. Cowboys 14–3. **Drive: 11 plays, 49 yards, 4:31.**
- KC – Lin Elliott 37-yard field goal, 0:04. Cowboys 14–6. **Drive: 8 plays, 64 yards, 0:48.**

**Third quarter**

- DAL – Jay Novacek 33-yard pass from Troy Aikman (Chris Boniol kick), 6:03. Cowboys 21–6. **Drive: 9 plays, 70 yards, 5:30.**
- KC – Lake Dawson 45-yard pass from Steve Bono (pass failed), 2:29. Cowboys 21–12. **Drive: 7 plays, 83 yards, 3:34.**

**Fourth quarter**

- DAL – Chris Boniol 20-yard field goal, 10:56. Cowboys 24–12. **Drive: 4 plays, 2 yards, 0:54.**

**Top passers**

- KC – Steve Bono – 20/36, 276 yards, TD
- DAL – Troy Aikman – 21/29, 192 yards, 2 TD

**Top rushers**

- KC – Greg Hill – 8 rushes, 41 yards
- DAL – Emmitt Smith – 18 rushes, 56 yards, TD

**Top receivers**

- KC – Tamarick Vanover – 4 receptions, 85 yards
- DAL – Michael Irvin – 11 receptions, 121 yards, TD

==== Week 14: at Oakland Raiders ====
Week 14: Kansas City Chiefs at Oakland Raiders – Game summary

Quarter	1	2	3	4	Total
**Chiefs**	6	6	10	7	**29**
Raiders	7	3	0	13	**23**

at Oakland–Alameda County Coliseum, Oakland, California

- Date: December 3
- Game time: 3:00 p.m. CST/1:00 p.m. PST
- Game weather: Increased clouds, 56 °F (13 °C)
- Game attendance: 53,930
- Referee: Dick Hantak
- TV announcers (NBC): Dick Enberg, Paul Maguire, Phil Simms and Jim Gray
- Recap, Game Book

Game information

**First quarter**

- OAK – Terry McDaniel 42-yard interception return (Jeff Jaeger kick), 13:59. Raiders 7–0.
- KC – Rich Gannon 12-yard run (kick failed, hit right upright), 0:32. Raiders 7–6. **Drive: 6 plays, 76 yards, 3:14.**

**Second quarter**

- OAK – Jeff Jaeger 46-yard field goal, 11:49. Raiders 10–6. **Drive: 9 plays, 45 yards, 3:43.**
- KC – Kimble Anders 23-yard run (kick failed, wide left), 3:24. Chiefs 12–10. **Drive: 3 plays, 53 yards, 1:32.**

**Third quarter**

- KC – Marcus Allen 1-yard run (Lin Elliott kick), 9:00. Chiefs 19–10. **Drive: 7 plays, 52 yards, 4:12.**
- KC – Lin Elliott 35-yard field goal, 0:44. Chiefs 22–10. **Drive: 4 plays, 9 yards, 1:55.**

**Fourth quarter**

- KC – Brian Washington 74-yard interception return (Lin Elliott kick), 7:37. Chiefs 29–10.
- OAK – James Jett 26-yard pass from Billy Joe Hobert (run failed), 6:37. Chiefs 29–16. **Drive: 3 plays, 75 yards, 1:00.**
- OAK – Tim Brown 1-yard pass from Billy Joe Hobert (Jeff Jaeger kick), 1:32. Chiefs 29–23. **Drive: 7 plays, 49 yards, 1:16.**

**Top passers**

- KC – Steve Bono – 9/14, 87 yards, INT
- OAK – Vince Evans – 23/37, 227 yards, 2 INT

**Top rushers**

- KC – Marcus Allen – 21 rushes, 124 yards, TD
- OAK – Harvey Williams – 7 rushes, 5 yards

**Top receivers**

- KC – Webster Slaughter – 3 receptions, 39 yards
- OAK – Tim Brown – 10 receptions, 150 yards, TD

==== Week 15: at Miami Dolphins ====
Week 15: Kansas City Chiefs at Miami Dolphins – Game summary

Quarter	1	2	3	4	Total
Chiefs	0	0	0	6	**6**
**Dolphins**	6	7	0	0	**13**

at Joe Robbie Stadium, Miami, Florida

- Date: December 11
- Game time: 9:00 p.m. EST/8:00 p.m. CST
- Game weather: Partly cloudy, 69 °F (21 °C)
- Game attendance: 70,321
- Referee: Johnny Grier
- TV announcers (ABC): Al Michaels, Frank Gifford, Dan Dierdorf and Lynn Swann
- Recap, Game Book

Game information

**First quarter**

- MIA – Pete Stoyanovich 33-yard field goal, 9:31. Dolphins 3–0. **Drive: 7 plays, 29 yards, 2:51.**
- MIA – Pete Stoyanovich 33-yard field goal, 1:30. Dolphins 6–0. **Drive: 8 plays, 27 yards, 4:11.**

**Second quarter**

- MIA – O. J. McDuffie 3-yard pass from Dan Marino (Pete Stoyanovich kick), 2:42. Dolphins 13–0. **Drive: 11 plays, 63 yards, 7:08.**

**Third quarter**

- No scoring plays.

**Fourth quarter**

- KC – Webster Slaughter 5-yard pass from Steve Bono (kick failed, wide left), 5:04. Dolphins 13–6. **Drive: 7 plays, 75 yards, 3:29.**

**Top passers**

- KC – Steve Bono – 15/37, 180 yards, TD, INT
- MIA – Dan Marino – 18/34, 156 yards, TD, INT

**Top rushers**

- KC – Marcus Allen – 16 rushes, 88 yards
- MIA – Bernie Parmalee – 24 rushes, 83 yards

**Top receivers**

- KC – Derrick Walker – 4 receptions, 56 yards
- MIA – Irving Fryar – 6 receptions, 80 yards

==== Week 16: vs. Denver Broncos ====
Week 16: Denver Broncos at Kansas City Chiefs – Game summary

Quarter	1	2	3	4	Total
Broncos	0	7	3	7	**17**
**Chiefs**	7	7	0	6	**20**

at Arrowhead Stadium, Kansas City, Missouri

- Date: December 17
- Game time: 3:00 p.m. CST
- Game weather: Cloudy, 37 °F (3 °C)
- Game attendance: 75,061
- Referee: Ed Hochuli
- TV announcers (NBC): Dick Enberg, Paul Maguire and Phil Simms
- Recap, Game Book

Game information

**First quarter**

- KC – Webster Slaughter 5-yard pass from Steve Bono (Lin Elliott kick), 9:23. Chiefs 7–0. **Drive: 6 plays, 35 yards, 3:20.**

**Second quarter**

- KC – Steve Bono 5-yard run (Lin Elliott kick), 3:01. Chiefs 14–0. **Drive: 12 plays, 80 yards, 7:16.**
- DEN – Ray Crockett 50-yard fumble return (Jason Elam kick), 0:03. Chiefs 14–7.

**Third quarter**

- DEN – Jason Elam 49-yard field goal, 4:37. Chiefs 14–10. **Drive: 7 plays, 56 yards, 2:46.**

**Fourth quarter**

- KC – Vaughn Booker 14-yard fumble return (pass failed), 1:52. Chiefs 20–10.
- DEN – Mike Pritchard 3-yard pass from John Elway (Jason Elam kick), 0:12. Chiefs 20–17. **Drive: 8 plays, 64 yards, 1:40.**

**Top passers**

- DEN – John Elway – 24/36, 242 yards, TD
- KC – Steve Bono – 23/37, 232 yards, TD

**Top rushers**

- DEN – Glyn Milburn – 10 rushes, 33 yards
- KC – Marcus Allen – 16 rushes, 54 yards

**Top receivers**

- DEN – Anthony Miller – 5 receptions, 60 yards
- KC – Lake Dawson – 5 receptions, 58 yards

==== Week 17: vs. Seattle Seahawks ====
Week 17: Seattle Seahawks at Kansas City Chiefs – Game summary

Quarter	1	2	3	4	Total
Seahawks	0	3	0	0	**3**
**Chiefs**	13	7	3	3	**26**

at Arrowhead Stadium, Kansas City, Missouri

- Date: December 24
- Game time: 12:00 p.m. CST
- Game weather: Clear, 31 °F (−1 °C)
- Game attendance: 75,784
- Referee: Gordon McCarter
- TV announcers (NBC): Jim Lampley and Bob Golic
- Recap, Game Book

Game information

**First quarter**

- KC – Tamarick Vanover 89-yard kickoff return (Lin Elliott kick), 14:45. Chiefs 7–0.
- KC – Lin Elliott 37-yard field goal, 10:22. Chiefs 10–0. **Drive: 7 plays, 39 yards, 2:52.**
- KC – Lin Elliott 20-yard field goal, 0:26. Chiefs 13–0. **Drive: 14 plays, 63 yards, 7:49.**

**Second quarter**

- SEA – Todd Peterson 34-yard field goal, 13:35. Chiefs 13–3. **Drive: 5 plays, 13 yards, 1:51.**
- KC – Tamarick Vanover 9-yard pass from Steve Bono (Lin Elliott kick), 10:16. Chiefs 20–3. **Drive: 7 plays, 53 yards, 3:19.**

**Third quarter**

- KC – Lin Elliott 20-yard field goal, 7:25. Chiefs 23–3. **Drive: 11 plays, 63 yards, 6:13.**

**Fourth quarter**

- KC – Lin Elliott 27-yard field goal, 4:34. Chiefs 26–3. **Drive: 9 plays, 49 yards, 5:04.**

**Top passers**

- SEA – John Friesz – 10/26, 80 yards
- KC – Steve Bono – 15/29, 209 yards, TD, INT

**Top rushers**

- SEA – Steve Broussard – 2 rushes, 15 yards
- KC – Greg Hill – 21 rushes, 113 yards

**Top receivers**

- SEA – Joey Galloway – 5 receptions, 50 yards
- KC – Webster Slaughter – 3 receptions, 73 yards

=== Standings ===
AFC West
	W	L	T	PCT	PF	PA	STK
^{(1)} Kansas City Chiefs	13	3	0	.813	358	241	W2
^{(4)} San Diego Chargers	9	7	0	.563	321	323	W5
Seattle Seahawks	8	8	0	.500	363	366	L1
Denver Broncos	8	8	0	.500	388	345	W1
Oakland Raiders	8	8	0	.500	348	332	L6

== Postseason ==
=== Schedule ===
Round	Date	Opponent (seed)	Result	Record	Venue	Attendance	Recap
Wild Card	First-round bye						
Divisional	January 7, 1996	Indianapolis Colts (5)	L 7–10	0–1	Arrowhead Stadium	77,594	Recap

=== Game summaries ===
==== AFC Divisional Playoffs: vs. (5) Indianapolis Colts ====
AFC Divisional Playoffs: (5) Indianapolis Colts at (1) Kansas City Chiefs – Game summary

Quarter	1	2	3	4	Total
Colts	0	7	3	0	10
Chiefs	7	0	0	0	7

at Arrowhead Stadium, Kansas City, Missouri

- Date: January 7
- Game time: 3:00 p.m. CST
- Game weather: Clear and cold, 11 °F (−12 °C)
- Game attendance: 77,594
- Referee: Jerry Markbreit
- TV announcers (NBC): Dick Enberg, Paul Maguire, Phil Simms and Jim Gray
- Recap, Game Book

Game information

First quarter

- KC – Lake Dawson 20-yard pass from Steve Bono (Lin Elliott kick), 0:29. Chiefs 7–0. Drive: 5 plays, 62 yards, 2:28.

Second quarter

- IND – Floyd Turner 5-yard pass from Jim Harbaugh (Cary Blanchard kick), 6:49. Tied 7–7. Drive: 18 plays, 77 yards, 5:40.

Third quarter

- IND – Cary Blanchard 30-yard field goal, 2:48. Colts 10–7. Drive: 9 plays, 35 yards, 4:34.

Fourth quarter

- No scoring plays.

Top passers

- IND – Jim Harbaugh – 12/27, 112 yards, TD, INT
- KC – Steve Bono – 11/25, 122 yards, TD, 3 INT

Top rushers

- IND – Lamont Warren – 20 rushes, 76 yards
- KC – Marcus Allen – 21 rushes, 94 yards

Top receivers

- IND – Sean Dawkins – 4 receptions, 37 yards
- KC – Lake Dawson – 4 receptions, 70 yards, TD

Entering the playoffs holding the league's best record and the one seed, the Chiefs played the Indianapolis Colts, who were coming off a dominant 35–20 win against the Chiefs' divisional rival in the San Diego Chargers. Against the Colts, the heavily favored Chiefs appeared to be in the driver's seat of their own destiny after jumping out to an early 7–0 lead in the first quarter thanks to a Lake Dawson touchdown catch from Steve Bono. It would, however, be the Chiefs' final points they would score of the season, as for the rest of the game, the Colts' defense swarmed Bono, picking him off three times throughout the remainder of the game. Aside from the dominating defensive effort from Indianapolis, the Colts also scored a touchdown of their own off a Jim Harbaugh-Floyd Turner touchdown pass to tie the game at 7–7 going into halftime. For the rest of the game, both offenses were stagnant in the frigid-cold air inside Arrowhead Stadium. While both teams had great opportunities to score, poor special teams performances on both sides would prove to be a hindrance. Despite this, the Colts attained the lead for good in the third quarter off a Cary Blanchard field goal (his only make in three attempts) to make the score 10–7. The aforementioned Colts defense, which had swarmed the Kansas City offense, forced head coach Marty Schottenheimer to make a change at quarterback late in the game, substituting Bono out for Rich Gannon in the fourth quarter after Bono's third interception of the game. However, after Dawson dropped a potential game-winning touchdown pass on the Chiefs' final drive, Schottenheimer opted for Lin Elliott to kick the game-tying field goal. Throughout the game, Elliott had been shaky on field goals, as up until that point he had been 0-2 from 35 and 39 yards. Despite this, he was trotted out to attempt to kick the game into a potential overtime; his third kick, this time from 43 yards, sailed well wide of the uprights, ending the Chiefs' season at a 13–4 record. The Colts, meanwhile, would advance to the AFC Championship Game, though they would lose in a thrilling matchup against the Pittsburgh Steelers. Chiefs lost and in 1996 missed the playoffs 9-7.
