= List of Kansas City Chiefs first-round draft picks =

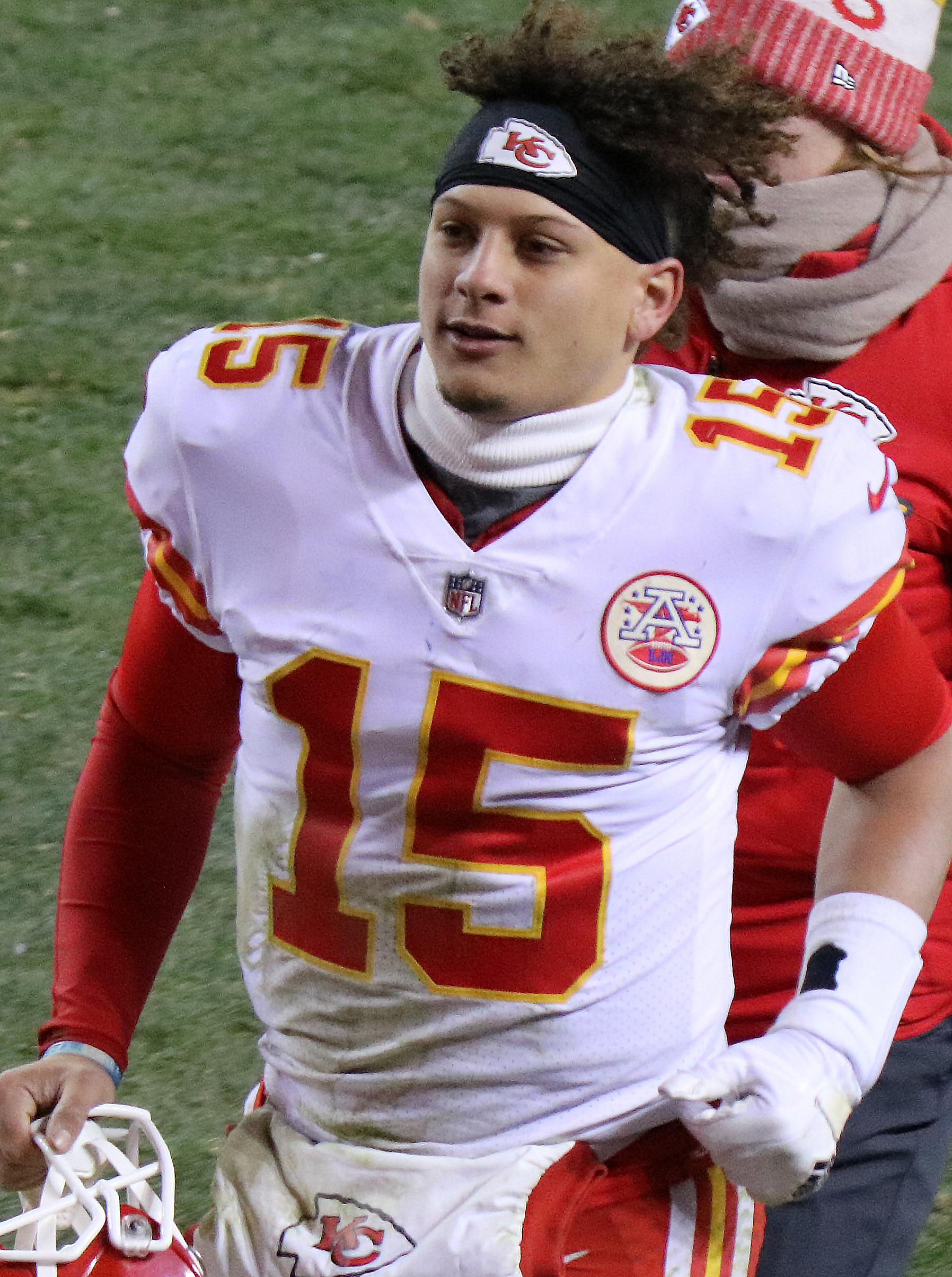
Patrick Mahomes was drafted 10th overall in the 2017 NFL draft. Since becoming the team's starting quarterback in 2018, Mahomes has been the league's Most Valuable Player twice (2018 and 2022), the 2018 Offensive Player of the Year, a three-time All-Pro, a six-time Pro Bowler, and the 2020 Sports Illustrated Sportsman of the Year. Mahomes has also played in five Super Bowls, three of which the Chiefs won (LIV, LVII, LVIII), and earned Super Bowl MVP in each victory.

The Kansas City Chiefs are a professional American football team based in Kansas City, Missouri. The Chiefs compete in the National Football League (NFL) as a member of the American Football Conference West Division. The team was founded in 1959 as the Dallas Texans by businessman Lamar Hunt, and was a charter member of the American Football League (AFL). In spring 1963, the team relocated to Kansas City, and assumed its current name. The Chiefs joined the NFL prior to the 1970 season as a result of the AFL–NFL merger.

The NFL draft, officially known as the "NFL Annual Player Selection Meeting", is an annual event which serves as the league's most common source of player recruitment. The draft order is determined based on the previous season's standings; the teams with the worst win–loss records receive the earliest picks. Teams that qualified for the NFL playoffs select after non-qualifiers, and their order depends on how far they advanced, using their regular season record as a tie-breaker. The final two selections in the first round are reserved for the Super Bowl runner-up and champion. Draft picks are tradable and players or other picks can be acquired with them.

Before the merger agreements in 1966, the AFL directly competed with the NFL and held a separate draft. This led to a bidding war over top prospects between the two leagues, along with the subsequent drafting of the same player in each draft. As part of the merger agreement on June 8, 1966, the two leagues began holding a multiple round "common draft". Once the AFL officially merged with the NFL in 1970, the "common draft" simply became the NFL draft. The first AFL draft was held prior to the start of the 1960 season. The first round of the 1960 AFL draft was territorial selections. Each team received a "territorial pick" which allowed them to select a single player within a pre-agreed upon designated region (the team's "territory"). Teams then agreed on the top eight players at each position, who were subsequently assigned to teams by random draw, with each of the eight teams receiving one of those players. This process was repeated until all 53 roster spots were filled. Beginning in the 1961 draft, the AFL, using the same system as the NFL, began to assign picks based on the previous season's standings.

Since the team's first draft, the Chiefs have selected 64 players in the first round. The team's first-round pick in the inaugural AFL draft was Don Meredith, a quarterback out of Southern Methodist University (SMU); he was the team's territorial selection. The Chiefs have held the first overall pick twice, once in the AFL draft, selecting Buck Buchanan in 1963, and once in the NFL draft, selecting Eric Fisher in 2013. In the most recent draft, held in 2026, the Chiefs selected LSU cornerback Mansoor Delane and Clemson defensive tackle Peter Woods.

The Chiefs did not draft a player in the first round on nine occasions. Four of the team's first-round picks—Buck Buchanan, Tony Gonzalez, Gale Sayers, and Derrick Thomas—have been elected to the Pro Football Hall of Fame; one of these, Sayers, chose not to play for the Chiefs and joined the NFL instead. The Chiefs used additional first-round picks in the 1960s to select Don Meredith and Ronnie Bull, who also chose to sign with the NFL instead.

== Player selections ==
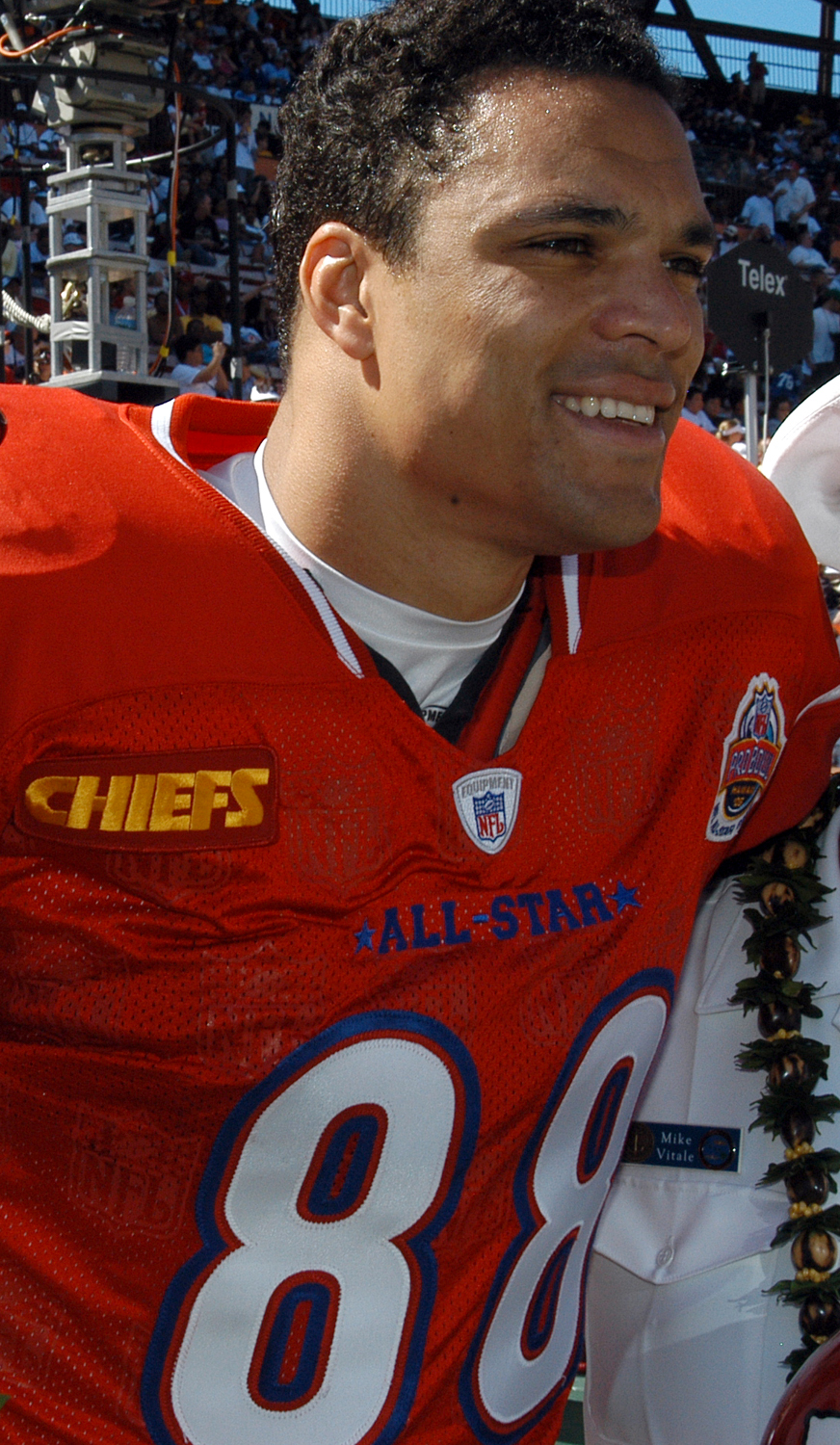
Tight end Tony Gonzalez was drafted 13th overall by the Chiefs in the 1997 NFL draft. Gonzales was a 14-time Pro Bowler, 10-time All-Pro, and finished his career with the most receptions and receiving yards by a tight end in history. He was inducted into the Chiefs Hall of Fame in 2018, the Pro Football Hall of Fame in 2019, and was also selected for the NFL 100th Anniversary All-Time Team.

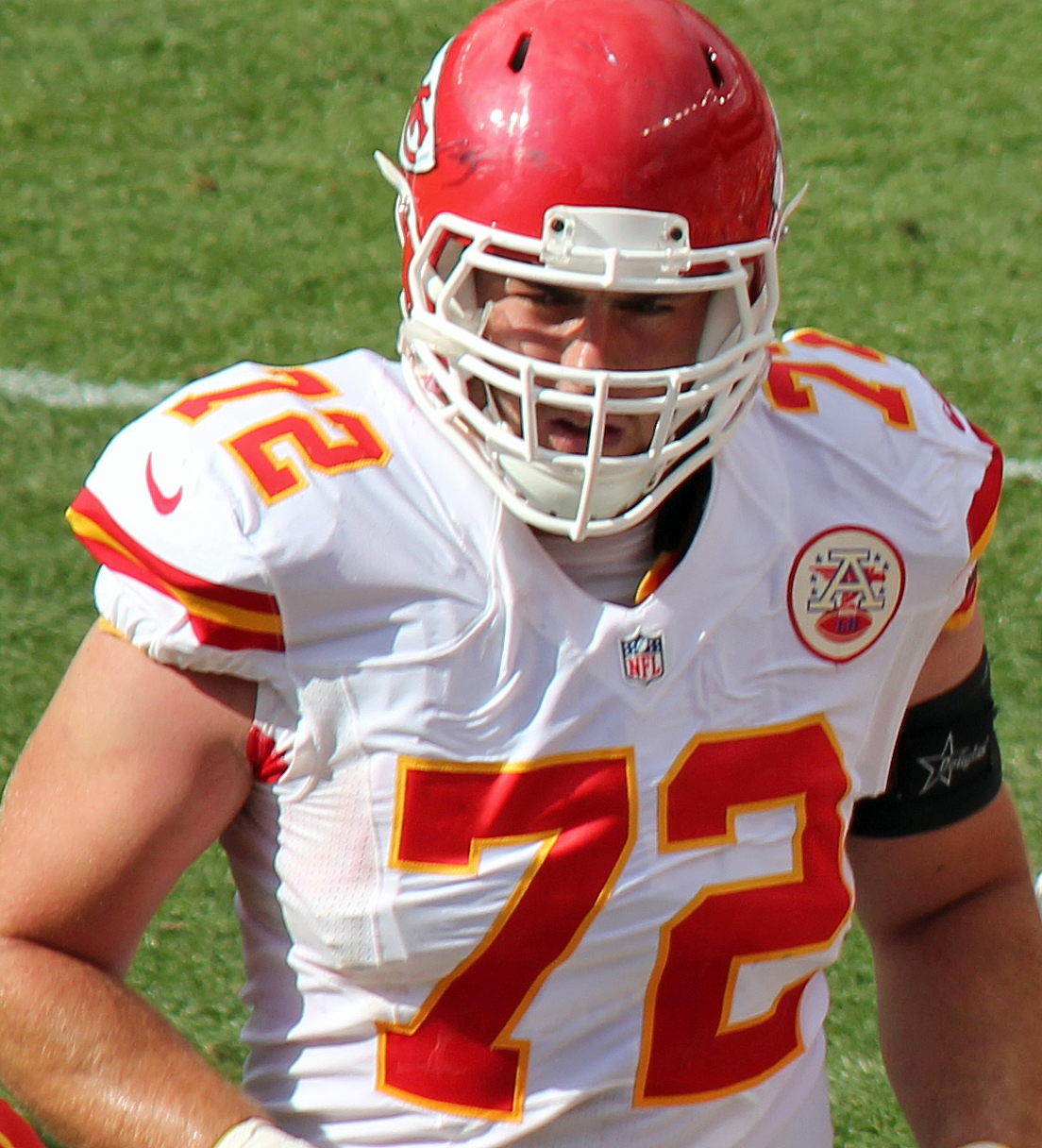
Eric Fisher was drafted first overall by the Chiefs in 2013. He played eight seasons for the team, during which time he was a two-time Pro Bowler.

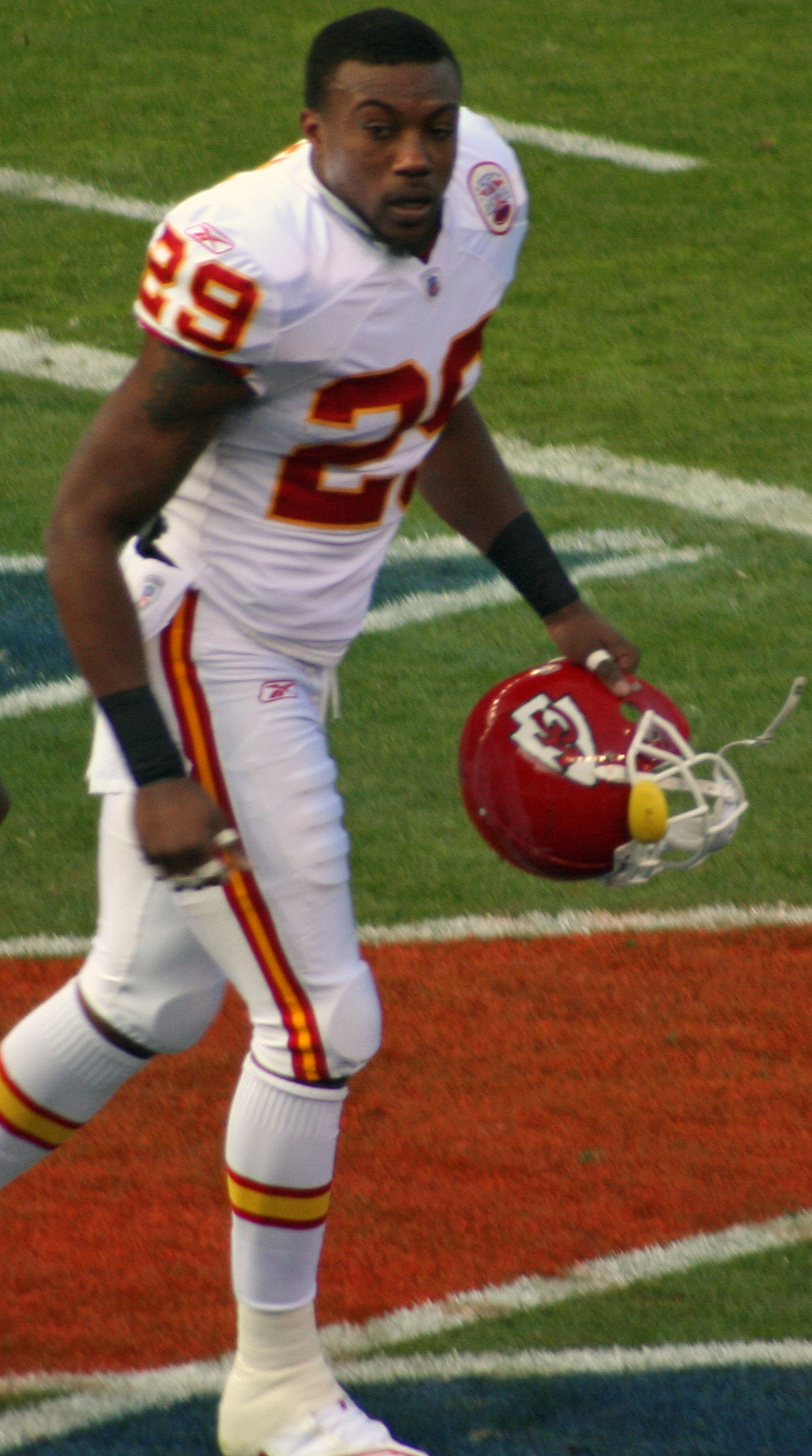
Eric Berry is a defensive back who was selected 5th overall in 2010. He spent his whole career with the Chiefs, during which time he was a three-time first-time All-Pro, five-time Pro Bowler, and was selected to the NFL 2010s All-Decade Team. Berry was diagnosed with Hodgkin's lymphoma in late 2014 and, after undergoing chemotherapy in the offseason and being declared cancer free, came back for the 2015 season. He earned Pro Bowl and All-Pro honors the two seasons following his diagnosis and won named the 2015 AP NFL Comeback Player of the Year.

Key
Symbol	Meaning
†	Inducted into the Pro Football Hall of Fame
*	Selected number one overall
‡	Selected number one overall and inducted into the Pro Football Hall of Fame

Position abbreviations
C	Center
CB	Cornerback
DB	Defensive back
DE	Defensive end
DT	Defensive tackle
G	Guard
LB	Linebacker
QB	Quarterback
RB	Running back
T	Tackle
TE	Tight end
WR	Wide receiver

Kansas City Chiefs (Note: The Kansas City Chiefs were previously known as the Dallas Texans (1960–1962).) first-round draft picks
Season	Pick	Player	Position	College	Notes
1960	Territorial	Don Meredith	QB	SMU	First round was territorial selections. (Note: The first round of the 1960 AFL draft was territorial selections. Teams were allowed to select a single player from a designated region (their "territory").) Chose to play for the NFL's Dallas Cowboys instead.
1961	6	E. J. Holub	C	Texas Tech	
1962	3	Ronnie Bull	RB	Baylor	Signed for the NFL's Chicago Bears instead
1963	1	Buck Buchanan‡	DT	Grambling	Pick received from Oakland Raiders (Note: Kansas City traded quarterback Cotton Davidson to the Oakland Raiders in exchange for their 1963 first-round selection (No. 1 overall) and the rights to defensive tackle Fred Miller.)
1963	8	Ed Budde	T	Michigan State	
1964	2	Pete Beathard	QB	USC	
1965	5	Gale Sayers†	RB	Kansas	Signed for the NFL's Chicago Bears instead
1966	6	Aaron Brown	DE	Minnesota	
1967	24	Gene Trosch	DT	Miami (FL)	
1968	19	Mo Moorman	G	Texas A&M	
1968	22	George Daney	G	UTEP	Pick received from Houston Oilers (Note: Kansas City traded quarterback Pete Beathard to the Houston Oilers in exchange for their 1968 first-round selection (No. 22 overall), quarterback Jacky Lee, and defensive tackle Ernie Ladd.)
1969	23	Jim Marsalis	DB	Tennessee State	
1970	26	Sid Smith	T	USC	
1971	16	Elmo Wright	WR	Houston	
1972	23	Jeff Kinney	RB	Nebraska	
1973	No pick				Pick traded to Chicago Bears (Note: Kansas City traded their 1973 first-round selection (No. 17 overall) to the Chicago Bears in exchange for the rights to defensive tackle George Seals.)
1974	16	Woody Green	RB	Arizona State	
1975	No pick				Pick traded to Houston Oilers (Note: Kansas City traded their 1975 first-round selection (No. 6 overall) and defensive tackle Curley Culp to the Houston Oilers in exchange for their 1976 third-round selection (No. 79 overall) and defensive tackle John Matuszak.)
1976	14	Rod Walters	G	Iowa	
1977	10	Gary Green	DB	Baylor	
1978	2	Art Still	DE	Kentucky	
1979	2	Mike Bell	DE	Colorado State	
1979	23	Steve Fuller	QB	Clemson	Moved up draft order in trade with Houston Oilers (Note: Kansas City traded their 1979 second-round selection (No. 31 overall) and 1980 second-round selection (No. 38 overall) to the Houston Oilers in exchange for their 1979 first-round selection (No. 23 overall).)
1980	11	Brad Budde	G	USC	
1981	14	Willie Scott	TE	South Carolina	
1982	11	Anthony Hancock	WR	Tennessee	Moved up draft order in trade with St. Louis Cardinals (Note: Kansas City traded their 1982 first- and third-round selections (Nos. 16 and 73 overall) to the St. Louis Cardinals in exchange for their 1982 first-round selection (No. 11 overall).)
1983	7	Todd Blackledge	QB	Penn State	
1984	5	Bill Maas	DT	Pittsburgh	
1984	21	John Alt	T	Iowa	Pick received from Los Angeles Rams (Note: Kansas City traded cornerback Gary Green to the Los Angeles Rams in exchange for their 1984 first- and fifth-round selections (Nos. 21 and 134 overall).)
1985	15	Ethan Horton	RB	North Carolina	
1986	7	Brian Jozwiak	T	West Virginia	
1987	19	Paul Palmer	RB	Temple	
1988	2	Neil Smith	DE	Nebraska	Moved up the draft order in trade with Detroit Lions (Note: Kansas City traded their 1988 first- and second-round selections (Nos. 3 and 29 overall) to the Detroit Lions in exchange for their 1988 first-round selection (No. 2 overall).)
1989	4	Derrick Thomas†	LB	Alabama	
1990	13	Percy Snow	LB	Michigan State	
1991	21	Harvey Williams	RB	LSU	
1992	20	Dale Carter	DB	Tennessee	
1993	No pick				Pick traded to San Francisco 49ers (Note: Kansas City traded their 1993 first-round selection (No. 18 overall) to the San Francisco 49ers in exchange for quarterback Joe Montana, safety David Whitmore, and a 1994 third-round selection (No. 92 overall).)
1994	25	Greg Hill	RB	Texas A&M	
1995	31	Trezelle Jenkins	T	Michigan	Moved down draft order in trade with Jacksonville Jaguars (Note: Kansas City traded their 1995 first-round selection (No. 19 overall) to the Jacksonville Jaguars in exchange for their 1995 first-, third-, and fourth-round selections (Nos. 31, 97, and 134 overall) and 1996 fourth-round selection (No. 113 overall).)
1996	28	Jerome Woods	DB	Memphis	
1997	13	Tony Gonzalez†	TE	California	Moved up draft order in trade with Tennessee Oilers (Note: Kansas City traded their 1997 first-, third-, fourth-, and sixth-round selections (Nos. 18, 81, 116, and 181 overall) to the Tennessee Oilers in exchange for their 1997 first- and fourth-round selections (Nos. 13 and 110 overall).)
1998	27	Victor Riley	T	Auburn	
1999	14	John Tait	T	BYU	
2000	21	Sylvester Morris	WR	Jackson State	
2001	No pick				Pick traded to St. Louis Rams (Note: Kansas City traded their 2001 first-round selection (No. 12 overall) to the St. Louis Rams in exchange for their 2001 fifth-round selection (No. 150 overall) and quarterback Trent Green.)
2002	6	Ryan Sims	DT	North Carolina	Moved up draft order in trade with Dallas Cowboys (Note: Kansas City traded their 2002 first- and third-round selections (Nos. 8 and 75 overall) and 2003 sixth-round selection (No. 186 overall) to the Dallas Cowboys in exchange for their 2003 first-round selection (No. 6 overall).)
2003	27	Larry Johnson	RB	Penn State	Moved down draft order in trade with Pittsburgh Steelers (Note: Kansas City traded their 2003 first-round selection (No. 16 overall) to the Pittsburgh Steelers in exchange for their 2003 first-, third-, and sixth-round selections (Nos. 27, 92, and 200 overall).)
2004	No pick				Pick traded to Detroit Lions (Note: Kansas City traded their 2004 first-round selection (No. 30 overall) to the Detroit Lions in exchange for their 2004 second- and fourth-round selections (Nos. 36 and 105 overall).)
2005	15	Derrick Johnson	LB	Texas	
2006	20	Tamba Hali	DE	Penn State	
2007	23	Dwayne Bowe	WR	LSU	
2008	5	Glenn Dorsey	DT	LSU	
2008	15	Branden Albert	G	Virginia	Pick received from Minnesota Vikings. (Note: Kansas City traded their 2009 sixth-round selection (No. 187 overall) and defensive end Jared Allen to the Minnesota Vikings in exchange for their 2008 first-, sixth-, and two third-round selections (Nos. 17, 73, 82, and 182 overall).) Moved up draft order in trade with Detroit Lions. (Note: Kansas City traded a 2008 first-, received from the Minnesota Vikings, third-, and fifth-round selection (Nos. 17, 66, and 136 overall) to the Detroit Lions in exchange for their 2008 first- and third-round selections (Nos. 15 and 76 overall).)
2009	3	Tyson Jackson	DE	LSU	
2010	5	Eric Berry	DB	Tennessee	
2011	26	Jon Baldwin	WR	Pittsburgh	Moved down draft order in trade with Cleveland Browns (Note: Kansas City traded their 2011 first-round selection (No. 21 overall) to the Cleveland Browns in exchange for their 2011 first- and third-round selections (Nos. 26 and 70 overall).)
2012	11	Dontari Poe	NT	Memphis	
2013	1	Eric Fisher*	T	Central Michigan	
2014	23	Dee Ford	DE	Auburn	
2015	18	Marcus Peters	CB	Washington	
2016	No pick				Moved down draft order in trade with San Francisco 49ers (Note: Kansas City traded their 2016 first-round selection (No. 28 overall) to the San Francisco 49ers in exchange for their 2016 second-, fourth-, and sixth-round selections (Nos. 37, 105, and 178 overall).)
2017	10	Patrick Mahomes	QB	Texas Tech	Moved up draft order in trade with Buffalo Bills (Note: Kansas City traded their 2017 first- and third-round selections (Nos. 27 and 91 overall) and 2018 first-round selection (No. 22 overall) to the Buffalo Bills in exchange for their 2017 first-round selection (No. 10 overall).)
2018	No pick				Pick traded to Buffalo Bills
2019	No pick				Pick traded to Seattle Seahawks (Note: Kansas City traded their 2019 first- and third-round selections (Nos. 29 and 92 overall) and 2020 second-round selection (No. 64 overall) to the Seattle Seahawks in exchange for their 2019 third-round selection (No. 84 overall) and defensive end Frank Clark.)
2020	32	Clyde Edwards-Helaire	RB	LSU	
2021	No pick				Pick traded to Baltimore Ravens (Note: Kansas City traded their 2021 first-, third-, and fourth-round selections (Nos. 31, 94, and 136 overall) and 2022 fifth-round selection (No. 173 overall) to the Baltimore Ravens in exchange for their 2021 second-round selection (No. 58 overall), 2022 sixth-round selection (No. 191 overall), and offensive tackle Orlanda Brown Jr.)
2022	21	Trent McDuffie	CB	Washington	Pick received from Miami Dolphins. (Note: Kansas City traded wide receiver Tyreek Hill to the Miami Dolphins in exchange for their 2022 first-, second, and fourth-round selections (Nos. 29, 50, and 121 overall) and 2023 fourth- and sixth-round selections (Nos. 122 and 178 overall).) Moved up draft order in trade with New England Patriots. (Note: Kansas City traded a 2022 first-, received from the Miami Dolphins, third-, and sixth-round selection (Nos. 29, 94, and 121 overall) to the New England Patriots in exchange for their 2022 first-round selection (No. 21 overall).)
2022	30	George Karlaftis	DE	Purdue	
2023	31	Felix Anudike-Uzomah	DE	Kansas State	
2024	28	Xavier Worthy	WR	Texas	Moved up draft order in trade with Buffalo Bills (Note: Kansas City traded their 2024 first-, third-, and seventh-round selections (Nos. 32, 95, and 221 overall) to the Buffalo Bills in exchange for their 2024 first-, fourth-, and seventh-round selections (Nos. 28, 133, and 248 overall).)
2025	32	Josh Simmons	T	Ohio State	Moved down draft order in trade with Philadelphia Eagles (Note: Kansas City traded their 2025 first-round selection (No. 31 overall) to the Philadelphia Eagles in exchange for their 2025 first- and fifth-round selections (Nos. 32 and 164 overall).)
2026	6	Mansoor Delane	CB	LSU	Moved up draft order in trade with Cleveland Browns (Note: Cleveland traded a first-round selection (6th overall) to Kansas City in exchange for first-, third- and fifth round selections (9th, 74th and 148th overall).)
2026	29	Peter Woods	DT	Clemson	Pick received from Los Angeles Rams (Note: The LA Rams traded first-, fifth- and sixth-round selections (29th, 169th and 210th overall), and a 2027 third-round selection to Kansas City in exchange for CB Trent McDuffie.)

== See also ==
- History of the Kansas City Chiefs
- List of Kansas City Chiefs seasons
