= Gunther Cunningham =

German gridiron football coach (1946–2019)

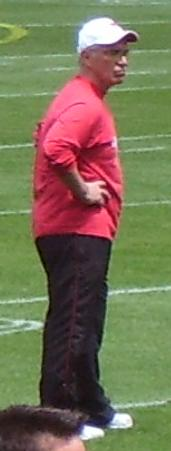

Personal information
- Born: June 19, 1946; Munich, Germany
- Died: May 11, 2019 (aged 72); Detroit, Michigan, U.S.

Career information
- College: Oregon

Career history
- Oregon (1969–1971) Defensive line coach; Arkansas (1972) Defensive line coach; Stanford (1973–1976); Assistant offensive line & freshman coach (1973); Defensive line coach (1974–1976); California (1977–1980); Defensive backs coach (1977); Linebackers coach (1978); Defensive coordinator & defensive line coach (1979–1980); Hamilton Tiger-Cats (1981) Defensive line coach & linebackers coach; Baltimore/Indianapolis Colts (1982–1984) Defensive line coach & linebackers coach; San Diego Chargers (1985–1990) Defensive line coach; Los Angeles Raiders (1991–1994); Linebackers coach (1991); Defensive coordinator (1992–1993); Defensive line coach (1994); Kansas City Chiefs (1995–2000); Defensive coordinator (1995–1998); Head coach (1999–2000); Tennessee Titans (2001–2003) Assistant head coach & linebackers coach; Kansas City Chiefs (2004–2008) Defensive coordinator; Detroit Lions (2009–2016); Defensive coordinator (2009–2013); Senior coaching assistant (2014–2016)

Head coaching record
- Regular season: 16–16 (.500)
- Coaching profile at Pro Football Reference

Gunther Cunningham (June 19, 1946 – May 11, 2019) was an American football head coach. He served as the Kansas City Chiefs head coach for two seasons. He also had two stints as the Chiefs' defensive coordinator. He served as an assistant coach for five other National Football League (NFL) teams and four college teams. He coached football for 47 consecutive seasons without taking any years off.

== Early life ==
Cunningham was born in 1946 in war-torn Munich, Germany to an American serviceman and a German mother before moving to the United States at age ten. He attended the University of Oregon, where he played linebacker and placekicker before embarking on a coaching career that spanned almost fifty years.

== Coaching career ==
In 1995, Cunningham was hired by the Chiefs as the defensive coordinator after spending the previous four seasons as a coach with the Los Angeles Raiders.

During his original tenure as defensive coordinator, Cunningham's defenses allowed an average of only 16.4 points per game, the best mark in the NFL and had a turnover margin of +30, tops in the AFC. Under his lead, a number of players excelled, including stars such as Neil Smith, James Hasty, Dale Carter, and Pro Football Hall of Fame linebacker Derrick Thomas. Cunningham's defenses aided Kansas City to an overall record of 42–22.

After the Chiefs missed the playoffs in 1998, head coach Marty Schottenheimer resigned, opening the door for Cunningham's promotion to the head coach position. In his first season, the Chiefs jumped to a 5–2 start but sputtered in the final games, limping to 9–6 before a matchup with the Oakland Raiders (eliminated the previous week from the playoffs) where a victory would give the Chiefs the AFC West. Playing at home, Kansas City jumped out to a 17–0 lead in the first quarter before the game turned into a shootout on the heels of a blocked punt recovered for a touchdown for Oakland on their way to a 28–24 halftime lead. Kansas City led 38–35 before Joe Nedney drilled a 38-yard field goal to tie the game late while Pete Stoyanovich missed a 44-yard field goal as time expire that saw overtime coming. Oakland won the coin toss and with a short field due to the kickoff going out of bounds, the Raiders charged through with a litany of passes to set up Nedney for a 33-yard field goal, which he drilled to win the game and eliminate the Chiefs from playoff contention. The 2000 season was overshadowed by the tragic death of defensive star Derrick Thomas, who died on February 8 from injuries after a car accident that left him paralyzed. Plagued by inconsistent QB play by Elvis Grbac, the Chiefs regressed to 7–9 and Cunningham was fired and replaced by Dick Vermeil. The move was controversial at the time as Cunningham claimed he was never informed by management that he was to be fired and only found out about it after discovering the article regarding his termination on the Chiefs website after he showed up to work one morning. Cunningham went on to become a successful linebackers coach for the Tennessee Titans. Cunningham was hired again in 2004 to revitalize a defense that had finished near or at the bottom of the overall rankings since Schottenheimer and Cunningham departed.

For the 2008 season, Cunningham coached the Chiefs' linebackers as well as serving as the defensive coordinator.

Cunningham was hired as the Detroit Lions defensive coordinator on January 21, 2009, about a week after the Lions hired new head coach Jim Schwartz, who he worked with on the Titans from 2001 to 2003.

In 2019, he was one of the awardees of the Paul "Dr. Z" Zimmerman Award (given out as a lifetime achievement award as an assistant coach) by the Professional Football Writers of America (PFWA).

== Personal life ==
He became a naturalized U.S. citizen on April 6, 2010. Cunningham and his wife had two children. Cunningham died on Saturday, May 11, 2019, from cancer.

== Head coaching record ==
Team	Year	Regular season					Postseason			
Team	Year	Won	Lost	Ties	Win %	Finish	Won	Lost	Win %	Result
KC	1999	9	7	0	.563	2nd in AFC West	-	-	-	-
KC	2000	7	9	0	.438	3rd in AFC West	-	-	-	-
Total		16	16	0	.500		-	-	-	-
