= James Hasty =

American football player (born 1965)

No. 40, 34
- Position: Cornerback

Personal information
- Born: May 23, 1965 (age 61); Seattle, Washington, U.S.
- Listed height: 6 ft 0 in (1.83 m)
- Listed weight: 211 lb (96 kg)

Career information
- High school: Franklin (Seattle)
- College: Central Washington; Washington State
- NFL draft: 1988: 3rd round, 74th overall pick

Career history
- New York Jets (1988–1994); Kansas City Chiefs (1995–2000); Oakland Raiders (2001)

Awards and highlights
- Second-team All-Pro (1997); 2× Pro Bowl (1997, 1999); NFL interceptions co-leader (1999); PFWA All-Rookie Team (1988); New York Jets All-Time Four Decade Team

Career NFL statistics
- Interceptions: 45
- Interception yards: 555
- Touchdowns: 4
- Stats at Pro Football Reference

James Edward Hasty (born May 23, 1965) is an American former professional football player who was a cornerback who played in the National Football League (NFL) for the New York Jets, Kansas City Chiefs, and Oakland Raiders for 14 seasons from 1988 to 2001. He played college football for the Washington State Cougars.

== Professional career ==
=== New York Jets ===
The New York Jets selected Hasty in the third round (74th overall) of the 1988 NFL draft. The Jets secured their acquisition of Hasty by trading their fourth (90th overall) and fifth-round picks (131st overall) to the Los Angeles Raiders in return for the third-round pick (74th overall) used to immediately draft Hasty. He was the seventh cornerback drafted in 1988.

==== 1988 season ====
On July 12, 1988, the New York Jets signed Hasty to a three—year, $540,000 rookie contract. Entering training, Hasty was slated to takeover as a starting cornerback following the departures of Jerry Holmes and Russell Carter during free agency. Head coach Joe Walton named Hasty a starting cornerback to begin the regular season, alongside veteran Bobby Humphery.

On September 4, 1988, Hasty earned his first career start in the Jets' season-opener at the New England Patriots during a 3–28 loss. The following week, he made his first career interception on a pass thrown by Gary Danielson as the Jets routed the Cleveland Browns 23–3 in Week 2. In Week 9, he was sidelined due to a sore hamstring as the Jets lost 20–24 against the Pittsburgh Steelers. In Week 12, he made an interception and had the first sack of his career on Jim Kelly during a 6–9 overtime loss at the Buffalo Bills. On December 10, 1988, Hasty made three combined tackles and set a career-high with two interceptions on passes thrown by Gary Hogeboom during a 16–34 win against the Indianapolis Colts. He finished his rookie season with 58 combined tackles, 22 pass deflections, five interceptions, three fumble recoveries, and one sack in 15 games and 15 starts.

==== 1989 season ====
He entered training camp in 1989 slated to retain his role as a starting cornerback. Head coach Joe Walton retained Hasty and Bobby Humphery as the starting cornerbacks to begin the regular season. On September 24, 1989, Hasty tied his career-high of two interceptions after picking off two pass attempts by Dan Marino during the Jets' 40–33 win at the Miami Dolphins. On October 15, 1989, Hasty had a fumble recovery and returned an interception thrown by Bobby Hebert 34—yards to score the first touchdown of his career as the Jets lost 14–29 at the New Orleans Saints. He started all 16 games for the first time in his career and recorded 63 combined tackles (51 solo), 21 pass deflections, five interceptions, two fumble recoveries, a forced fumble, and one touchdown. On December 26, 1989, the New York Jets fired head coach Joe Walton and his entire coaching staff after finishing the 1989 NFL season with a 4–12 record.

==== 1990 season ====
On February 6, 1990, the New York Jets hired Bruce Coslet to takeover as their new head coach. Hasty entered training camp slated as the de facto No. 1 starting cornerback following the departure of Bobby Humphery. Defensive coordinator Pete Carroll opted to change from a zone defense to a bump and run coverage. Head coach Bruce Coslet named Hasty a starting cornerback to begin the regular season and paired him with rookie Tony Stargell. On September 9, 1990, Hasty started in the New York Jets' season-opener at the Cincinnati Bengals and made one solo tackle, a pass deflection, and intercepted a pass thrown by Boomer Esiason as they lost 20—25. In Week 10, he set a season-high with 11 combined tackles (eight solo) during a 3—17 loss to the Miami Dolphins. He started all 16 games throughout the 1990 NFL season and finished with 66 combined tackles, 14 pass deflections, three fumble recoveries, a forced fumble, and two interceptions.

==== 1991 season ====
He remained the Jets' No. 1 starting cornerback throughout the 1991 NFL season and was paired with Tony Stargell and Michael Brim. In Week 4, he set a season-high with 12 combined tackles (10 solo) and had one pass break-up during a 13—19 overtime loss at the Chicago Bears. On November 24, 1991, Hasty recorded nine combined tackles (four solo), tied his season-high of two pass deflections, and intercepted a pass attempt by John Friesz as the Jets routed the San Diego Chargers 3—24. He started all 16 games and finished with a total of 94 combined tackles, 14 pass deflections, four fumble recoveries, and three interceptions. His four fumble recoveries tied Chris Burkett for most in the NFL in 1991.

==== 1992 season ====
Head coach Bruce Coslet retained Hasty and Michael Brim as the starting cornerbacks throughout the 1992 NFL season. On October 4, 1992, Hasty recorded three solo tackles, made one pass deflection, and intercepted a pass by Hugh Millen during a 21—30 victory against the New England Patriots. In Week 13, he set a season-high with seven combined tackles during a 13–24 loss at the Buffalo Bills. He started in all 16 games for the fourth consecutive season and finished with 65 combined tackles, two interceptions, two forced fumbles, and two fumble recoveries. He led the team with 17 pass deflections in 1992.

==== 1993 season ====
Following the conclusion of the 1992 NFL season, Hasty became a restricted transitional free agent after the Jets exercised the first right of refusal that allowed Hasty to negotiate with other teams and receive contract offers, but gave the Jets the option to retain Hasty if they chose to match any offers made by teams. The Cincinnati Bengals met with Hasty and made a two—year contract offer with a salary of $1.7 million.

On May 4, 1993, the New York Jets agreed to match the Bengals offer of $1.7 million. On May 5, 1993, the New York Jets re-signed Hasty to a two—year, $4 million contract that made him the highest salaried defensive back in the NFL.

Entering training camp, Hasty was slated as the No. 1 starting cornerback. Head coach Bruce Coslet named Hasty a starting cornerback to begin the season and paired him with Eric Thomas. On September 26, 1993, Hasty recorded two solo tackles, set a season-high with two pass deflections, and intercepted Drew Bledsoe's pass to Greg McMurtry as the Jets routed the New England Patriots 7—45. In Week 16, he set a season-high with seven combined tackles (six solo) as the Jets lost 7—28 to the Dallas Cowboys. He started in all 16 games and finished with 68 combined tackles, five pass deflections, and two interceptions.

==== 1994 season ====
On January 7, 1994, the New York Jets fired head coach Bruce Coslet after they finished the 1994 NFL season with an 8—8 record. The Jets subsequently named defensive coordinator Pete Carroll as their new head coach. During training camp, Hasty underwent arthroscopic knee surgery due to an injury. The Jets selected cornerback Aaron Glenn in the first round (12th overall) of the 1994 NFL draft. Head coach Pete Carroll named Hasty and rookie Aaron Glenn the starting cornerbacks to begin the season.

On November 20, 1994, Hasty recorded six combined tackles (five solo), tied his season-high of two pass deflections, made a sack, and intercepted Warren Moon's pass attempt to running back Robert Smith during a 31—21 victory at the Minnesota Vikings. In Week 13, Hasty set a season-high with ten combined tackles (eight solo), made one pass deflection, and intercepted Dan Marino's pass attempt to Mark Ingram as the Jets lost 28—24 to the Miami Dolphins. He started all 16 games for the sixth consecutive season and finished with 88 combined tackles (77 solo), ten pass deflections, five interceptions, two forced fumbles, and two fumble recoveries. He set a career-high with three sacks in 1994.

=== Kansas City Chiefs ===
==== 1995 season ====
On April 1, 1995, the Kansas City Chiefs signed Hasty to a four—year, $5.25 million contract as an unrestricted free agent. Head coach Marty Schottenheimer named Hasty a starting cornerback to begin the season, pairing him with Dale Carter.

On September 3, 1995, Hasty set a season-high with eight solo tackles, made two pass deflections, forced a fumble, and intercepted Rick Mirer's pass attempt to Brian Blades during a 34—10 win at the Seattle Seahawks. On September 17, 1995, Hasty made five solo tackles, one pass deflection, recovered a fumble, and led the Chiefs to a 17—23 overtime victory against the Oakland Raiders by intercepting a pass attempt by Jeff Hostetler and returning it for a 64—yard touchdown to end overtime. On December 3, 1995, Hasty recorded five solo tackles, set a season-high with six pass deflections, and intercepted Vince Evans' pass attempt to wide receiver Daryl Hobbs during a 29—23 victory at the Oakland Raiders. In Week 16, he set a season-high with seven combined tackles (six solo) and made one pass deflection during a 20—17 win against the Denver Broncos. He started in all 16 games and finished with 75 combined tackles (72 solo), 17 pass deflections, three interceptions, a forced fumble, a fumble recovery, and one touchdown.

==== 1996 season ====
Hasty and Dale Carter returned as the starting cornerbacks for the 1996 NFL season. On September 8, 1996, Hasty made two combined tackles (one solo) and scored a touchdown after returning a fumble recovery for 85—yards following Derrick Thomas forcing a fumble by Billy Joe Tolliver while making a sack during a 19—3 victory against the Oakland Raiders. He was sidelined during the Chiefs' 7—17 loss to the Pittsburgh Steelers in Week 6 due to a hamstring injury. In Week 14, he set a season-high with six combined tackles (five solo) during a 28—24 victory at the Detroit Lions. He finished with 43 combined tackles (39 solo), six pass deflections, a fumble recovery, a sack, and a touchdown in 15 games and 14 starts.

== After football ==
From 2001 to 2004, Hasty was an assistant football coach for Bellevue High School who won 4 straight State Championships in the state of Washington. In 2010, he rejoined the coaching staff of the Bellevue Wolverines as a defensive backs coach. The Bellevue Defensive Coordinator was headed by Chris Beak who had served in various coaching duties in the NFL himself. In September 2010, Chris Beak re-entered the NFL as an offensive assistant coach with the San Francisco 49ers. This led to his taking over as the Bellevue defensive coordinator, where he won another three state titles and a Sports Illustrated National Championship.

He started working for ESPN as an NFL analyst on May 3, 2006, where he was also a college football analyst.

== NFL career statistics ==
=== Regular season ===
Legend
	Led the league
**Bold**	Career high

Year	Team	Games		Tackles				Interceptions					Fumbles			
Year	Team	GP	GS	Comb	Solo	Ast	Sck	Int	Yds	Avg	Lng	TD	FF	FR	Yds	TD
1988	NYJ	15	15	58	—	—	1.0	5	20	4.0	16	0	0	3	35	0
1989	NYJ	**16**	**16**	63	—	—	0.0	5	62	12.4	34	1	1	2	2	0
1990	NYJ	**16**	**16**	66	—	—	0.0	2	0	0.0	0	1	3	0	0	0
1991	NYJ	**16**	**16**	**94**	—	—	0.0	3	39	13.0	39	0	0	**4**	7	0
1992	NYJ	**16**	**16**	65	—	—	0.0	2	18	9.0	18	0	**2**	2	0	0
1993	NYJ	**16**	**16**	68	—	—	0.0	2	22	11.0	22	0	1	2	28	0
1994	NYJ	**16**	**16**	88	**77**	11	**3.0**	5	90	18.0	40	0	**2**	2	0	0
1995	KC	**16**	**16**	75	72	3	0.0	3	89	**29.7**	**64**	**1**	1	1	20	0
1996	KC	15	14	43	39	4	1.0	0	0	0.0	0	0	1	1	**80**	**1**
1997	KC	**16**	15	74	62	12	2.0	3	22	7.3	19	0	0	1	0	0
1998	KC	**16**	14	63	53	10	1.0	4	42	10.5	21	0	0	1	0	0
1999	KC	15	15	85	72	**13**	1.0	**7**	**98**	14.0	56	**2**	0	0	0	0
2000	KC	**16**	**16**	67	58	9	1.0	4	53	13.3	38	0	1	2	0	0
2001	OAK	1	0	1	1	0	0.0	0	0	0.0	0	0	0	0	0	0
Career		206	201	910	434	62	10.0	45	555	12.3	64	4	8	24	172	1

== Personal life ==
Hasty is a member of the Omega Psi Phi fraternity while attending Washington State University.

Hasty's sons, J.R. and Tyler, played football at Bellevue High School. J.R. played football at the University of Washington and Central Washington University but was dismissed from each football program. Tyler redshirted the 2012 football season at Oregon State University but was dismissed from the team following an arrest.
