= Kimble Anders =

American football player (born 1966)

No. 38
- Position: Fullback

Personal information
- Born: September 10, 1966 (age 60); Galveston, Texas, U.S.
- Listed height: 5 ft 11 in (1.80 m)
- Listed weight: 218 lb (99 kg)

Career information
- High school: Ball (Galveston)
- College: Houston
- NFL draft: 1990: undrafted

Career history
- Pittsburgh Steelers (1990)*; Kansas City Chiefs (1991–2000)
- * Offseason or practice squad member only

Awards and highlights
- 3× Pro Bowl (1995–1997); Kansas City Chiefs Hall of Fame

Career NFL statistics
- Rushing yards: 2,261
- Rushing average: 4.6
- Touchdowns: 18
- Stats at Pro Football Reference

Kimble Lynard Anders (born September 10, 1966) is an American former professional football player who was a fullback in the National Football League (NFL). He played college football for the Houston Cougars.

== Early life ==
He played college football at the University of Houston where he produced 261 carries for 1,359 yards and 16 touchdowns to go with 115 receptions for 1,718 and 11 scores.

== Professional career ==
Kimble was signed as an undrafted free agent by the Pittsburgh Steelers in 1990. In 1991, he was signed as a free agent by the Kansas City Chiefs. He played for the Chiefs throughout his career. On December 31, 1994 in a playoff game vs the Miami Dolphins, which the Chiefs ultimately lost 27-17, he caught a 57 yard touchdown pass from Joe Montana which wound up being the last touchdown pass of Montana's career. In 2022, the Chiefs announced he would be inducted into the team's Hall of Fame during the 2022 season.

== NFL career statistics ==
Legend
**Bold**	Career high

=== Regular season ===
Year	Team	Games		Rushing					Receiving				
Year	Team	GP	GS	Att	Yds	Avg	Lng	TD	Rec	Yds	Avg	Lng	TD
1991	KAN	2	0	0	0	0.0	0	0	2	30	**15.0**	23	0
1992	KAN	11	2	1	1	1.0	1	0	5	65	13.0	28	0
1993	KAN	**16**	13	75	291	3.9	18	0	40	326	8.2	27	1
1994	KAN	**16**	13	62	231	3.7	19	**2**	**67**	525	7.8	30	1
1995	KAN	**16**	13	58	**398**	**6.9**	44	**2**	55	349	6.3	28	1
1996	KAN	**16**	**15**	54	201	3.7	15	**2**	60	**529**	8.8	45	**2**
1997	KAN	15	14	**79**	397	5.0	43	0	59	453	7.7	**55**	**2**
1998	KAN	**16**	**15**	58	230	4.0	20	1	64	462	7.2	29	**2**
1999	KAN	2	2	32	181	5.7	46	0	2	14	7.0	9	0
2000	KAN	15	7	76	331	4.4	**69**	**2**	15	76	5.1	12	0
		125	94	495	2,261	4.6	69	9	369	2,829	7.7	55	9

=== Playoffs ===
Year	Team	Games		Rushing					Receiving				
Year	Team	GP	GS	Att	Yds	Avg	Lng	TD	Rec	Yds	Avg	Lng	TD
1992	KAN	1	0	0	0	0.0	0	0	0	0	0.0	0	0
1993	KAN	**3**	**2**	**8**	**28**	**3.5**	**15**	0	4	37	9.3	12	0
1994	KAN	1	1	5	17	3.4	7	0	6	**103**	**17.2**	**57**	**1**
1995	KAN	1	1	5	16	3.2	8	0	**7**	44	6.3	13	0
1997	KAN	1	1	3	9	3.0	6	0	2	4	2.0	3	0
		7	5	21	70	3.3	15	0	19	188	9.9	57	1

== Personal life ==
On April 4, 2013, it was announced that Anders would return to his home town of Galveston, Texas to serve as Head Coach for Ball High School and athletic director for Galveston Independent School District.
