= Steve Bono =

American football player (born 1962)

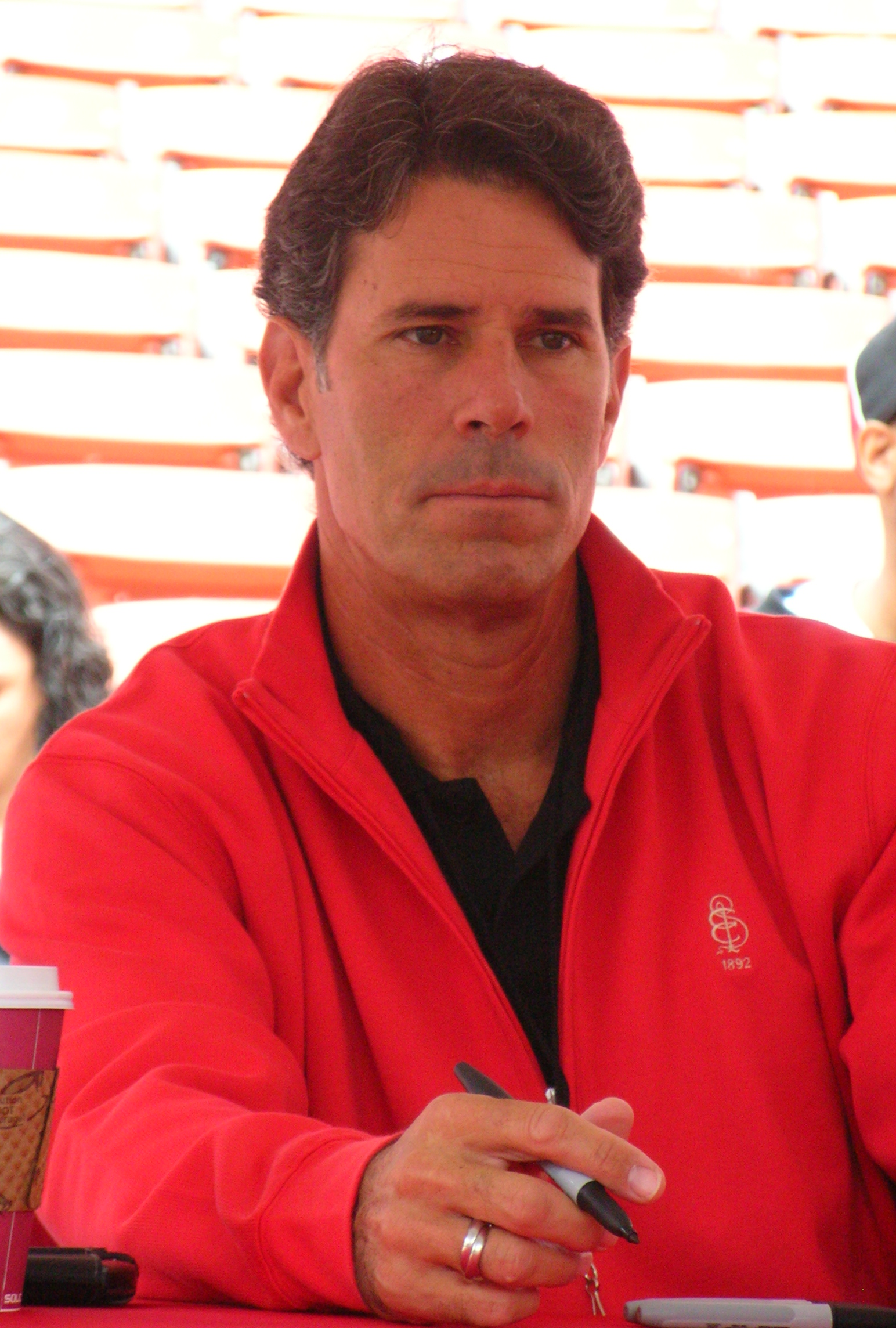
- Bono in 2009

No. 12, 13, 15
- Position: Quarterback

Personal information
- Born: May 11, 1962 (age 64); Norristown, Pennsylvania, U.S.
- Listed height: 6 ft 4 in (1.93 m)
- Listed weight: 215 lb (98 kg)

Career information
- High school: Norristown Area
- College: UCLA (1980–1984)
- NFL draft: 1985: 6th round, 142nd overall pick

Career history
- Minnesota Vikings (1985–1986); Pittsburgh Steelers (1987–1988); San Francisco 49ers (1989–1993); Kansas City Chiefs (1994–1996); Green Bay Packers (1997); St. Louis Rams (1998); Carolina Panthers (1999)

Awards and highlights
- Super Bowl champion (XXIV); Pro Bowl (1995)

Career NFL statistics
- Passing attempts: 1,701
- Passing completions: 934
- Completion percentage: 54.9%
- TD–INT: 62–42
- Passing yards: 10,439
- Passer rating: 75.3
- Stats at Pro Football Reference

Steven Christopher Bono (born May 11, 1962) is an American former professional football player who was a quarterback in the National Football League (NFL). He played college football for the UCLA Bruins and was selected by the Minnesota Vikings in the sixth round of the 1985 NFL draft. He played for seven different teams in 15 different seasons, spending the most time with the San Francisco 49ers and Kansas City Chiefs.

== College career ==
Bono attended the University of California at Los Angeles, where he received a degree in sociology. As a Bruins quarterback, Bono posted collegiate career numbers of 177 completions in 315 attempts. On January 1, 1985, Bono threw for 243 yards and 2 touchdowns on his way to Quarterbacking the Bruins to Victory in the 1985 Fiesta Bowl over Bernie Kosar and the Miami Hurricanes. Bono also earned a varsity letter in baseball as the team's catcher.

== Professional career ==
=== Minnesota Vikings ===
Bono was selected by the Minnesota Vikings with the 142nd overall pick in the sixth round in the 1985 NFL draft.

In his first two seasons with the Vikings (1985 and 1986), Bono appeared in two games. He spent both seasons third on the depth chart behind starter Tommy Kramer and his backup Wade Wilson. At the end of the 1986 season, the Vikings placed Bono on waivers.

=== Pittsburgh Steelers ===
Bono then signed as a free agent with the Pittsburgh Steelers. Bono appeared in five games over two seasons with the Steelers (1987-1988). He made his first NFL start on October 4, 1987, against the Atlanta Falcons. After the 1988 season, the Steelers allowed Bono to become a free agent.

=== San Francisco 49ers ===
On June 13, 1989, Bono signed a contract with the San Francisco 49ers where he remained for five seasons, his longest stay with one team in his career. The 49ers would win Super Bowl XXIV in his first season with the team, marking the only Super Bowl win of his career. However, he did not play in the game. Bono spent the 1989 and 1990 seasons as the 49ers' third-string quarterback behind Joe Montana and Steve Young. In 1991, with Montana lost for the season, and Steve Young injured mid-season, Bono started six games. He went 5–1 as a starter and finished the season fourth in passer rating. Bono returned to his backup role behind Young in 1992 and 1993.

=== Kansas City Chiefs ===
Prior to the 1994 season, the 49ers traded Bono to the Kansas City Chiefs, where once again he served as a backup to his former 49ers teammate Joe Montana. After Montana retired, Bono became the starting quarterback in 1995. On October 1, 1995, in a game against the Arizona Cardinals, Bono ran 76 yards for a touchdown, the longest scoring run by a quarterback in NFL history up to that time. In the same season, he guided the Chiefs to a 13–3 record and a division title. At season's end, he was selected for the AFC Pro Bowl team. Bono remained the Chiefs starter throughout the 1996 season.

=== Journeyman years ===
Bono finished his career with several short stints. He signed as a free agent with the Green Bay Packers in 1997. Bono spent 1998 with the St. Louis Rams. The following year, he signed with the Carolina Panthers.

== NFL career statistics ==
Legend
	Won the Super Bowl
**Bold**	Career high

Year	Team	Games			Passing							
Year	Team	GP	GS	Record	Cmp	Att	Pct	Yds	TD	Int	Lng	Rtg
1985	MIN	1	0	–	1	10	10.0	5	0	0	5	39.6
1986	MIN	1	0	–	1	1	**100.0**	3	0	0	3	79.2
1987	PIT	3	3	2–1	34	74	45.9	438	5	2	57	76.3
1988	PIT	2	0	–	10	35	28.6	110	1	2	15	25.9
1989	SF	1	0	–	4	5	80.0	62	1	0	45	**157.9**
1990	SF	0	0	–	Did not play							
1991	SF	9	6	5–1	141	237	59.5	1,617	11	4	**78**	88.5
1992	SF	16	0	–	36	56	64.3	463	2	2	36	87.1
1993	SF	8	0	–	39	61	63.9	416	0	1	33	76.9
1994	KC	7	2	0–2	66	117	56.4	796	4	4	62	74.6
1995	KC	16	16	**13–3**	**293**	**520**	56.3	**3,121**	**21**	10	60	79.5
1996	KC	14	13	8–5	235	438	53.7	2,572	12	**13**	69	68.0
1997	GB	2	0	–	5	10	50.0	29	0	0	14	56.2
1998	STL	6	2	0–2	69	136	50.7	807	5	4	47	69.1
1999	CAR	2	0	–	0	1	0.0	0	0	0	0	39.6
Career		88	42	28–14	934	1,701	54.9	10,439	62	42	78	75.3

== Personal life ==
Bono and his wife have two children, and live in Palo Alto, California. His son, Christoph, was the quarterback for the Palo Alto High School's football team and then played baseball for the UCLA Bruins. Christoph played with future NFL wide receiver Davante Adams in high school. Christoph also played professionally in the San Francisco Giants and San Diego Padres minor league systems and with the independent Gary SouthShore RailCats.

An avid golfer, Bono held an annual golf event in the San Francisco area benefiting the National Kidney Foundation. Bono also played in the 1993 Pebble Beach National Pro-Am golf tournament, one of the most prestigious pro-am events in the United States.

As of 2023, Bono works for Morgan Stanley as a financial advisor in Palo Alto California.
