= Louie Aguiar =

American football player (born 1966)

No. 12, 4, 5, 10
- Position: Punter

Personal information
- Born: June 30, 1966 (age 60); Livermore, California, U.S.
- Listed height: 6 ft 2 in (1.88 m)
- Listed weight: 215 lb (98 kg)

Career information
- High school: Granada (Livermore)
- College: Utah State
- NFL draft: 1989: undrafted

Career history
- Buffalo Bills (1989)*; (1990)*; Barcelona Dragons (1991); New York Jets (1991–1993); Kansas City Chiefs (1994–1998); Green Bay Packers (1999); St. Louis Rams (2000)*; Chicago Bears (2000); Green Bay Packers (2002)*; Peoria Pirates (2004)
- * Offseason or practice squad member only

Awards and highlights
- Second-team All-Pro (1995)

Career NFL statistics
- Punts: 758
- Punting Yards: 31,221
- Punting Avg: 41.2
- Stats at Pro Football Reference

Louis Raymond Aguiar (born June 30, 1966) is an American former professional football player who was a punter in the National Football League (NFL). He played college football for the Utah State Aggies. In his pro career, he played for the Barcelona Dragons (1991) of the World League of American Football, the New York Jets(1991–1993), the Kansas City Chiefs (1994–1998), the Green Bay Packers (1999), and the Chicago Bears (2000) of the NFL.

After his playing days, Aguiar coached for 12 years at Waterloo High School and Seckman Highschool

Aguiar is divorcing Teri Bollinger, a former Miss Illinois Teen USA 1990 and Miss Missouri USA 1999. She is also a former contestant on The Biggest Loser, Season 18.

He was named as the New York Jets assistant special teams coach on February 5, 2013.

== NFL career statistics ==
Legend
**Bold**	Career high

=== Regular season ===
Year	Team	Punting									
Year	Team	GP	Punts	Yds	Net Yds	Lng	Avg	Net Avg	Blk	Ins20	TB
1991	NYJ	16	64	2,521	2,217	61	39.4	34.6	0	14	7
1992	NYJ	16	73	2,993	2,744	65	41.0	37.6	0	21	3
1993	NYJ	16	73	2,806	2,510	**71**	38.4	34.4	0	21	7
1994	KAN	16	85	3,582	2,936	61	42.1	34.5	0	15	7
1995	KAN	16	**91**	**3,990**	**3,317**	65	**43.8**	36.5	0	**29**	**12**
1996	KAN	16	88	3,667	2,975	68	41.7	33.8	0	25	10
1997	KAN	16	82	3,465	3,130	65	42.3	**38.2**	0	28	4
1998	KAN	16	75	3,226	2,613	59	43.0	34.4	**1**	20	5
1999	GNB	15	75	2,954	2,544	64	39.4	33.9	0	20	4
2000	CHI	9	52	2,017	1,816	56	38.8	34.9	0	8	4
Career		152	758	31,221	26,802	71	41.2	35.3	1	201	63

=== Playoffs ===
Year	Team	Punting									
Year	Team	GP	Punts	Yds	Net Yds	Lng	Avg	Net Avg	Blk	Ins20	TB
1991	NYJ	1	2	72	72	41	36.0	36.0	0	0	0
1994	KAN	1	2	80	80	52	40.0	**40.0**	0	**2**	0
1995	KAN	1	4	147	117	48	36.8	29.3	0	0	**1**
1997	KAN	1	**5**	**232**	**196**	**62**	**46.4**	39.2	0	**2**	0
Career		4	13	531	465	62	40.8	35.8	0	4	1
