= 1995 All-Pro Team =

Official list of the best NFL players in 1995

The 1995 All-Pro Team is composed of the National Football League players that were named to the Associated Press, Pro Football Writers Association, and The Sporting News All-Pro Teams in 1995. Both first and second teams are listed for the AP team. These are the three teams that are included in Total Football II: The Official Encyclopedia of the National Football League. In 1995 the Pro Football Writers Association and Pro Football Weekly combined their All-pro teams, a practice which continued through 2008. In 1995 all three All-pro teams returned to a 4-3 defense, picking only one middle linebacker.

== Teams ==
Offense
Position	First team	Second team
Quarterback	Brett Favre, Green Bay Packers (AP, PFWA, TSN)	Steve Young, San Francisco 49ers (AP-2t); Dan Marino, Miami Dolphins (AP-2t)
Running back	Barry Sanders, Detroit Lions (AP, PFWA, TSN); Emmitt Smith, Dallas Cowboys (AP, PFWA, TSN)	Chris Warren, Seattle Seahawks (AP-2); Marshall Faulk, Indianapolis Colts (AP-2)
Wide receiver	Herman Moore, Detroit Lions (AP, PFWA, TSN); Jerry Rice, San Francisco 49ers (AP, PFWA, TSN)	Cris Carter, Minnesota Vikings (AP-2); Carl Pickens, Cincinnati Bengals (AP-2)
Tight end	Ben Coates, New England Patriots (AP, PFWA, TSN)	Shannon Sharpe, Denver Broncos (AP-2)
Tackle	Lomas Brown, Detroit Lions (AP, PFWA); Willie Roaf, New Orleans Saints (AP, PFWA, TSN); Erik Williams, Dallas Cowboys (TSN)	Gary Zimmerman, Denver Broncos (AP-2); Richmond Webb, Miami Dolphins (AP-2)
Guard	Randall McDaniel, Minnesota Vikings (AP, PFWA, TSN); Nate Newton, Dallas Cowboys (AP, PFWA); Larry Allen, Dallas Cowboys (TSN)	Steve Wisniewski, Oakland Raiders (AP-2); Larry Allen, Dallas Cowboys (AP-2)
Center	Dermontti Dawson, Pittsburgh Steelers (AP, PFWA, TSN)	Kevin Glover, Detroit Lions (AP-2)

Special teams
Position	First team	Second team
Kicker	Morten Andersen, Atlanta Falcons (AP, PFWA, TSN)	Jason Elam, Denver Broncos (AP-2)
Punter	Darren Bennett, San Diego Chargers (AP, PFWA, TSN)	Louie Aguiar, Kansas City Chiefs (AP-2)
Kick Returner	Brian Mitchell, Washington Redskins (AP, PFWA, TSN)	Glyn Milburn, Denver Broncos (AP-2)
Punt Returner	Brian Mitchell, Washington Redskins (PFWA); Glyn Milburn, Denver Broncos (TSN)	
Special Teams	Steve Tasker, Buffalo Bills (PFWA)	

Defense
Position	First team	Second team
Defensive end	Reggie White, Green Bay Packers (AP, PFWA, TSN); Bruce Smith, Buffalo Bills (AP, PFWA, TSN)	Neil Smith, Kansas City Chiefs (AP-2); William Fuller, Philadelphia Eagles (AP-2)
Defensive tackle	Chester McGlockton, Oakland Raiders (AP, PFWA); John Randle, Minnesota Vikings (AP, PFWA, TSN); Eric Swann, Arizona Cardinals (TSN)	Dana Stubblefield, San Francisco 49ers (AP-2); Andy Harmon, Philadelphia Eagles (AP-2)
Middle linebacker	Junior Seau, San Diego Chargers (PFWA, TSN); Ken Norton Jr., San Francisco 49ers (AP)	Junior Seau, San Diego Chargers (AP-2)
Outside linebacker	Greg Lloyd, Pittsburgh Steelers (AP, PFWA, TSN); Bryce Paup, Buffalo Bills (AP, PFWA, TSN)	William Thomas, Philadelphia Eagles (AP-2); Ken Harvey, Washington Redskins (AP-2)
Cornerback	Aeneas Williams, Arizona Cardinals (AP, PFWA, TSN); Eric Davis, San Francisco 49ers (AP, PFWA); Deion Sanders, Dallas Cowboys (TSN)	Dale Carter, Kansas City Chiefs (AP-2); Terry McDaniel, Oakland Raiders (AP-2)
Safety	Merton Hanks, San Francisco 49ers (AP, PFWA, TSN); Darren Woodson, Dallas Cowboys (AP, PFWA, TSN)	Carnell Lake, Pittsburgh Steelers (AP-2); Tim McDonald, San Francisco 49ers (AP-2)

== Key ==
- AP = Associated Press first-team All-Pro
- AP-2 = Associated Press second-team All-Pro
- AP-2t = Tied for second-team All-Pro in the AP vote
- PFWA = Pro Football Writers Association All-NFL
- TSN = The Sporting News All-Pro
