= Greg Hill (running back) =

American football player (born 1972)

No. 29, 27, 21
- Position: Running back

Personal information
- Born: February 23, 1972 (age 54); Dallas, Texas, U.S.
- Listed height: 5 ft 11 in (1.80 m)
- Listed weight: 207 lb (94 kg)

Career information
- High school: Dallas Carter
- College: Texas A&M
- NFL draft: 1994: 1st round, 25th overall pick

Career history
- Kansas City Chiefs (1994–1997); St. Louis Rams (1998); Detroit Lions (1999)

Awards and highlights
- Third-team All-American (1992); 2× First-team All-SWC (1991, 1992)

Career NFL statistics
- Rushing yards: 3,218
- Rushing average: 4.2
- Rushing touchdowns: 12
- Stats at Pro Football Reference

Gregory LaMonte Hill (born February 23, 1972) is an American former professional football player who was a running back in the National Football League (NFL) from 1994 to 1999.

== High school ==
Hill attended David W. Carter High School in Dallas, Texas, where he was a highly recruited running back and was named to all-district, all-Texas, and All-America teams after rushing for 1,122 yards and 14 touchdowns as a senior in 1989. He had transferred from Bishop Dunne Catholic School prior to his senior year.

== College ==
He starred collegiately at Texas A&M, where in 1991 he made an immediate impact in the first game of his freshman year by rushing for 212 yards (which is still an NCAA freshman debut record) in a 45-7 Aggie thrashing of LSU. He would go on to set the A&M freshman rushing record that year at 1,216 yards.

His best season came during his sophomore season in 1992, when The Sporting News named him a second-team All-American running back after he rushed for 1,339 yards (3rd all-time for a single season at Texas A&M) and became the fastest running back in Southwest Conference history to reach 2,000 career yards.

In 1993, he set a record for longest run by an Aggie with a 94-yard scamper against TCU (later broken by D'Andre "Tiki" Hardeman). He finished his A&M career with 3,262 rushing yards - 3rd all-time for the Aggies, and added 33 touchdowns (5th all-time).

The only blemish on his career at Texas A&M was his involvement in a scandal in which 9 players received money from a booster for work that they did not perform. This led to an NCAA investigation that resulted in Texas A&M being put on probation and being banned from television appearances and postseason competition during the 1994 season. The timing of this penalty was particularly painful for Aggie football, as the team was unbeaten that season, yet unable to participate in a bowl game. Many Aggie fans felt jilted, as Hill declared early for the NFL draft just days after the NCAA sanctions were announced.

== NFL ==
Hill was selected by the Kansas City Chiefs in the first round (25th overall) of the 1994 NFL draft, the third Texas A&M player chosen in the first round that year behind Sam Adams and Aaron Glenn. Once again he made an immediate impact in his first season playing well as a backup to legend Marcus Allen, picking up 574 yards rushing and averaging 4.1 per carry. He appeared in all 16 games and making one start. He had the third-most rushing yards among all AFC rookies and was the Chiefs leading rusher in five games.

The following season, he moved into a platoon role with Allen, appearing in all 16 contests and again making one start. He had the first 100-yard game of his career with 109 yards on 15 carries (7.3-yard avg.) in the season opener on September 3 vs. Seattle. Allen and Hill formed a formidable tandem, combining for 1,557 yards (667 of those gained by Hill). The Chiefs had an impressive year, finishing 13–3, but lost to an underdog Indianapolis Colts team in their first playoff game.

The Allen-Hill platoon continued in the 1996 season, in which the Chiefs were picked by many to win the AFC. Although Hill played well, rushing for 645 yards on a 4.8 average, the Chiefs were disappointing, going 9-7 and narrowly missing the playoffs.

Hill and Allen switched roles in 1997 with Hill becoming the starter and the veteran Allen spelling him in relief. Although Hill started every game for the Chiefs that year, it was a disappointing season for him as he finished with only 550 yards with a subpar 3.5 average per carry. Hill was granted free agency after the 1997 season and signed with the St. Louis Rams.

Hill once again made a quick start in 1998, leading the league in rushing and scoring with 240 yards and 4 touchdowns on a 6.0 average through the first two games of the season. Unfortunately, he broke his leg during the third game and never saw the field again for St. Louis. Hill fell to second-string when the Rams acquired Marshall Faulk, the best all-purpose back in the NFL during that era, two days before the NFL draft.

The unexpected retirement of Barry Sanders two days before the 1999 training camp opened left the Detroit Lions thin at running back, so they acquired Hill from St. Louis in exchange for two draft picks to help fill that void. Hill started eight games in 1999 and rushed for 542 yards and two touchdowns. He was released by the Lions after that season.

Hill spent the 2000 season out of football and although there were rumors that Marty Schottenheimer (who coached Hill in Kansas City) and the Washington Redskins would pick Hill up for the 2001 season, it was not to be. Hill never returned to the NFL.

In six career seasons in the NFL, Hill rushed for 3,218 yards and 12 touchdowns.

Hill was an on-air talent with Kevin Scott on KRLD-FM 105.3 The Fan until June 22, 2009.

=== NFL statistics ===
Rushing Stats

Year	Team	Games	Carries	Yards	Yards per carry	Longest carry	Touchdowns	First downs	Fumbles	Fumbles lost
1994	KC	16	141	574	4.1	20	1	22	1	1
1995	KC	16	155	667	4.3	27	1	27	2	1
1996	KC	15	135	645	4.8	28	4	30	1	1
1997	KC	16	157	550	3.5	38	0	23	1	0
1998	STL	2	40	240	6.0	46	4	12	0	0
1999	DET	14	144	542	3.8	45	2	20	1	1
Career		79	772	3,218	4.2	46	12	134	6	4

Receiving Stats

Year	Team	Games	Receptions	Yards	Yards per Reception	Longest Reception	Touchdowns	First Downs	Fumbles	Fumbles Lost
1994	KC	16	16	92	5.8	21	0	4	0	0
1995	KC	16	7	45	6.4	13	0	3	0	0
1996	KC	15	3	60	20.0	34	1	3	0	0
1997	KC	16	12	126	10.5	39	0	4	0	0
1998	STL	2	1	6	6.0	6	0	0	0	0
1999	DET	14	13	77	5.9	15	0	1	0	0
Career		79	52	406	7.8	39	1	15	0	0
