= Bryan Proby =

American football player (born 1971)

No. 67
- Position: Defensive line

Personal information
- Born: November 30, 1971 (age 54); Compton, California, U.S.
- Listed height: 6 ft 5 in (1.96 m)
- Listed weight: 285 lb (129 kg)

Career information
- High school: Banning (Los Angeles, California)
- College: Arizona State
- NFL draft: 1995: 6th round, 202nd overall pick

Career history
- Kansas City Chiefs (1995–1996); Scottish Claymores (1996, 1998)
- Stats at Pro Football Reference

Bryan Craig Proby (November 30, 1971) is an American former professional football player who was a defensive lineman for the Kansas City Chiefs of the National Football League (NFL). He played college football for the Arizona State Sun Devils. He was selected by the Chiefs in the sixth round (202nd overall) of the 1995 NFL draft.

== After football ==
In July 2010, Proby opened a barbecue restaurant, Big Belly's BBQ, in Tempe, Arizona. The restaurant has since closed.
