= Lake Dawson =

American football player & executive (born 1972)

Oklahoma Sooners
- Title: Senior assistant general manager

Personal information
- Born: January 2, 1972 (age 54); Boston, Massachusetts, U.S.
- Listed height: 6 ft 1 in (1.85 m)
- Listed weight: 204 lb (93 kg)

Career information
- High school: Federal Way (Federal Way, Washington)
- College: Notre Dame
- NFL draft: 1994: 3rd round, 92nd overall pick

Career history

Playing
- Kansas City Chiefs (1994–1997); Indianapolis Colts (1999)

Operations
- Seattle Seahawks Pro scout & pro personnel assistant (2001–2004) Assistant director of pro personnel (2004–2007); Tennessee Titans Director of pro personnel (2007–2010) Vice president of football operations (2011–2012) Vice president of player personnel (2012–2015); Cleveland Browns (2016) Senior personnel executive; Buffalo Bills (2017–2024) Assistant director of college scouting; Oklahoma (2025–present) Senior assistant general manager

Career NFL statistics
- Receptions: 103
- Receiving yards: 1,406
- Receiving touchdowns: 10
- Stats at Pro Football Reference

Lake Dawson (born January 2, 1972) is an American former professional football player who currently serves as a senior assistant general manager for the Oklahoma Sooners. He graduated from Federal Way High School in 1990, where he had participated in football, basketball, and track. He played for the University of Notre Dame from 1990 to 1994 and then was selected as a wide receiver for the Kansas City Chiefs in the NFL, where he remained for four seasons. He also was listed for two years on the roster of the Indianapolis Colts but ultimately retired due to injury.

== Football executive ==
Dawson served as the Vice President of Football Operations for the Tennessee Titans from 2011 to 2015. Dawson was hired by the Buffalo Bills in May 2017 to be Assistant Director of College Scouting.

On June 13, 2025, after eight years with Buffalo, Dawson was hired to serve as the senior assistant general manager of the Oklahoma Sooners under general manager Jim Nagy.

== Personal life ==
He earned Master of Business Administration from Kelley School of Business at Indiana University Bloomington.
