= Lin Elliott =

American football player (born 1968)

No. 2
- Position: Placekicker

Personal information
- Born: November 11, 1968 (age 57); Euless, Texas, U.S.
- Listed height: 6 ft 0 in (1.83 m)
- Listed weight: 182 lb (83 kg)

Career information
- High school: Waco (Waco, Texas)
- College: Texas Tech
- NFL draft: 1992: undrafted

Career history
- Dallas Cowboys (1992–1993); Atlanta Falcons (1993)*; Kansas City Chiefs (1994–1995); Minnesota Vikings (1996)*
- * Offseason or practice squad member only

Awards and highlights
- Super Bowl champion (XXVII); Second-team All-SWC (1991)

Career NFL statistics
- Field goals att-made: 99–75 (.758)
- Extra points att-made: 118–113 (.958)
- Points: 338
- Stats at Pro Football Reference

Lindley Franklin Elliott Jr. (born November 11, 1968) is an American former professional football player who was a placekicker in the National Football League (NFL) for the Dallas Cowboys and Kansas City Chiefs. He played college football for the Texas Tech Red Raiders. He earned a Super Bowl ring with the Cowboys in Super Bowl XXVII.

== Early life ==
Elliott attended Waco High School, where he practiced football and soccer. In soccer, he was a four-time All-district selection.

He walked on at Texas Tech University. As a sophomore, he was named the starter at placekicker, making 9 out of 19 field goal attempts (47.4%).

As a junior, he made 14 out of 17 field goal attempts for a school record 82.4%. As a senior, he made 17 (tied school record) out of 26 field goal attempts, set the school's consecutive extra point record (85) and was second in the conference with 85 points. Against Cal State Fullerton, he tied the school record for field goals in a game with 4 (all over 40 yards), including a career-long tying 52-yarder.

Elliott finished as the school's all-time leading scorer at the time (220 points), while making 40 out of 62 field goal attempts (64.5%) and 100 (school record) out of 101 extra points (64.5%).

In 2015, he was inducted into the Texas Tech Athletic Hall of Fame.

== Professional career ==
=== Dallas Cowboys ===
Elliott was signed as an undrafted free agent by the Dallas Cowboys after the 1992 NFL draft, to compete as the replacement for kicker Ken Willis. He recovered from a pulled groin muscle in training camp, to be named the starter over Brad Daluiso. He started the regular season slowly until hitting 13 straight field goals and registering 27 touchbacks, which at the time were both franchise records. His 24 field goals were a rookie record and third in club history. His 3 field goals over 50 yards in a single-season ranked second in franchise history. His 119 points set a team rookie record, while ranking fourth in the NFL and leading all rookies. He was part of the Super Bowl XXVII winning team.

In 1993, he missed an extra point attempt in the season opener against the Washington Redskins. He missed two field goals in the 10–13 loss against the Buffalo Bills in the second game, contributing to a 0–2 start. On September 14, he was released.

=== Kansas City Chiefs ===
On April 7, 1994, he signed as a free agent with the Kansas City Chiefs. He registered 25-of-30 field goals (83.3%).

In 1995, he made 24 of 30 field goals (80%), contributing to the team going 13–3 in the regular season and clinching home field advantage throughout the playoffs, making them heavy favorites. But he is best remembered for missing three field goal attempts from 35, 39, and 42 yards in a 10–7 playoff loss to the Indianapolis Colts in January 1996. He suffered a late-season swoon, as his final miss against the Colts was his ninth missed kick in five games.

On February 16, 1996, the Chiefs decided not to make him a qualifying offer as a restricted free agent, effectively releasing him, even though he had an 81.7% field goal accuracy during his two seasons, ranking as the second-most accurate kicker in Chiefs history.

=== Minnesota Vikings ===
On August 1, 1996, he signed with the Minnesota Vikings as a free agent. He was released before the season started on August 20. This marked the end of his NFL career.
