= Neil Smith (American football) =

American football player (born 1966)

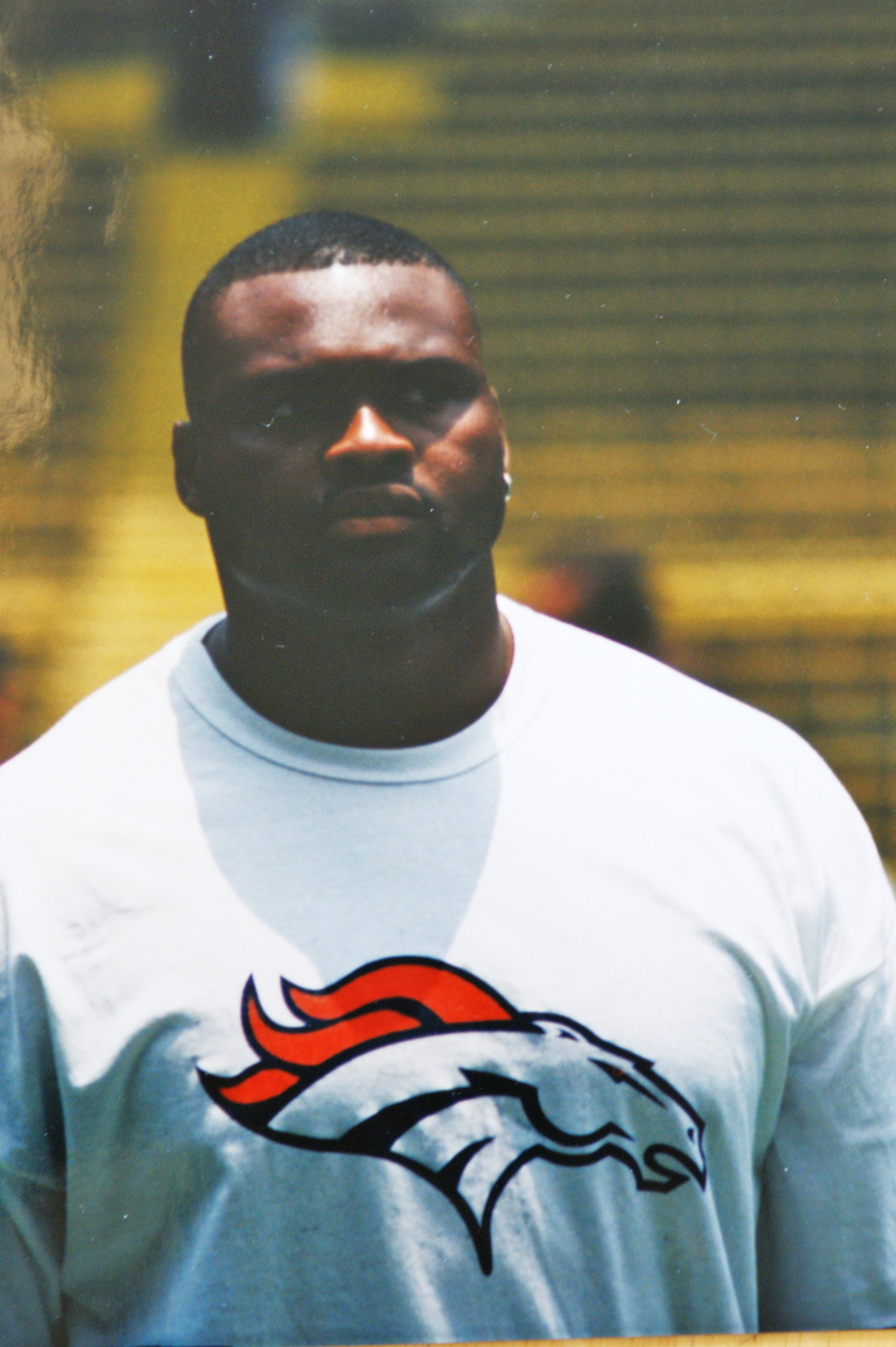
- Smith, c. 1997–1999

No. 90, 91
- Position: Defensive end

Personal information
- Born: April 10, 1966 (age 60); New Orleans, Louisiana, U.S.
- Listed height: 6 ft 4 in (1.93 m)
- Listed weight: 270 lb (122 kg)

Career information
- High school: McDonogh 35 (New Orleans)
- College: Nebraska (1984–1987)
- NFL draft: 1988: 1st round, 2nd overall pick

Career history
- Kansas City Chiefs (1988–1996); Denver Broncos (1997–1999); San Diego Chargers (2000)

Awards and highlights
- 2× Super Bowl champion (XXXII, XXXIII); First-team All-Pro (1993); 3× Second-team All-Pro (1992, 1995, 1997); 6× Pro Bowl (1991–1995, 1997); NFL forced fumbles co-leader (1994); NFL sacks leader (1993); NFL 1990s All-Decade Team; Kansas City Chiefs Hall of Fame; Second-team All-American (1987); First-team All-Big Eight (1987)

Career NFL statistics
- Tackles: 625
- Sacks: 104.5
- Forced fumbles: 30
- Fumble recoveries: 12
- Stats at Pro Football Reference

Neil Smith (born April 10, 1966) is an American former professional football player who was a defensive end in the National Football League (NFL). He played for the Kansas City Chiefs from 1988 to 1996, the Denver Broncos from 1997 to 1999, and the San Diego Chargers in 2000. Before his NFL career, he played college football for the Nebraska Cornhuskers, where he was an All-American in 1987. He also co-owned an arena football team, the Kansas City Command.

== Early life ==
Born in New Orleans, Smith graduated from McDonogh No. 35 Senior High School in the city.

== Professional career ==
The Chiefs, who had the third pick, made it known to everyone before the 1988 NFL draft that they intended to take Smith. The Detroit Lions, picking second, threatened to pick Smith and the Chiefs were forced to move up one slot to make sure that Smith would be their pick. Incidentally, one of the draft picks the Chiefs surrendered in order to move up turned out to be star linebacker Chris Spielman. Smith's pre-draft measurables were head-turning. He was 6' 4¼", weighed 257 pounds, had a 7-foot-1½-inch arm span, and ran a 4.55 forty-yard dash.

== NFL career statistics ==
Legend
	Won the Super Bowl
	Led the league
**Bold**	Career high

Year	Team	GP	Tackles				Interceptions			Fumbles			
Year	Team	GP	Cmb	Solo	Ast	Sck	Int	Yds	TD	FF	FR	Yds	TD
1988	KC	13	53	—	—	2.5	0	0	0	1	0	0	0
1989	KC	15	67	—	—	6.5	0	0	0	4	2	3	**1**
1990	KC	16	**68**	—	—	9.5	0	0	0	4	1	0	0
1991	KC	16	65	—	—	8.0	0	0	0	3	2	**10**	0
1992	KC	16	77	—	—	14.5	**1**	22	**1**	2	2	0	0
1993	KC	16	55	—	—	**15.0**	**1**	3	0	4	**3**	0	0
1994	KC	14	46	**42**	4	11.5	**1**	**41**	0	**5**	1	6	0
1995	KC	16	55	**42**	**13**	12.0	0	0	0	4	1	0	0
1996	KC	16	41	34	7	6.0	0	0	0	1	0	0	0
1997	DEN	14	34	29	5	8.5	0	0	0	1	0	0	0
1998	DEN	14	27	20	7	4.0	**1**	2	0	1	0	0	0
1999	DEN	15	31	25	6	6.5	0	0	0	0	0	0	0
2000	SD	10	6	5	1	0.0	0	0	0	0	0	0	0
Career		191	625	197	43	104.5	4	68	1	30	12	19	1

== Legacy ==
One of the top defensive linemen of his era, Smith made the Pro Bowl 6 times during his career (1991–1995 and 1997), and led the NFL with 15 sacks in the 1993 season. With the Broncos, Smith won 2 NFL championship rings for Super Bowl XXXII and Super Bowl XXXIII. In the 1998 Divisional Playoffs against the Miami Dolphins, Smith cemented the 38-3 Broncos victory with a 79-yard fumble return for a touchdown, and in Super Bowl XXXII, he recorded a key fumble recovery that set up a Broncos field goal.

Smith finished his 13 NFL seasons with 104.5 sacks, 30 forced fumbles, 12 fumble recoveries, 19 return yards, and 1 touchdown. He also intercepted 4 passes, returning them for 68 yards and a touchdown. He is the former co-owner of the Kansas City Brigade, a team in the Arena Football League from 2006 until 2008.

On October 22, 2006, Smith was inducted to the Chiefs's Hall of Honor.

== Notes ==
Smith's trademark sack celebration, which consisted of him pantomiming swinging a baseball bat, was invented in tribute to another Kansas City sports hero, Hall Of Famer George Brett.

There was a rule created in his name. The "Neil Smith" rule, enacted in 1998, prevents a defensive lineman from flinching to induce a false start penalty on the offense.

Smith appeared as a panelist on the Nickelodeon game show Figure it Out. He also appeared in a series of Campbell's Chunky Soup commercials.

The Kansas City Command retired #90 in his honor.
