= Trezelle Jenkins =

American football player (born 1973)

No. 74
- Position: Offensive tackle

Personal information
- Born: March 13, 1973 (age 53); Chicago, Illinois, U.S.
- Listed height: 6 ft 7 in (2.01 m)
- Listed weight: 317 lb (144 kg)

Career information
- High school: Morgan Park (Chicago)
- College: Michigan
- NFL draft: 1995: 1st round, 31st overall pick

Career history
- Kansas City Chiefs (1995–1997); New Orleans Saints (1997); Minnesota Vikings (1998)*
- * Offseason or practice squad member only

Career NFL statistics
- Games played: 9
- Games started: 1
- Stats at Pro Football Reference

Trezelle Samuel Jenkins (born March 13, 1973) is an American former professional football player. He played college football as an offensive tackle for the University of Michigan from 1991 to 1995. His nickname at U of M was "Tree." After being drafted in the first round of the 1995 NFL draft, he played professional football in the National Football League (NFL) for the Kansas City Chiefs from 1995 to 1997.

== Early life ==
Jenkins was born in Chicago, Illinois, in 1973. He attended, and played football at, Morgan Park High School in Chicago.

== University of Michigan ==
Jenkins enrolled at the University of Michigan in January 1991 and was the first ever to enroll early as a college football player. This is now a popular practice amongst student athletes wanting to get an early start on their collegiate career. He played college football for head coach Gary Moeller's Michigan Wolverines football teams from 1991 to 1995.

As a sophomore in 1992, Jenkins started nine games at left offensive tackle for the undefeated 1992 Michigan Wolverines football team that compiled a 9-0-3 record and defeated Washington in the 1993 Rose Bowl. As a junior, he started seven games (two at left tackle and five at right tackle), and as a senior, he started all 12 games at left tackle.

== Professional football ==
Pre-draft measurables
Height	Weight	Arm length	Hand span	40-yard dash	10-yard split	20-yard split	20-yard shuttle	Vertical jump	Broad jump	Bench press
6 ft 7 3/8 in (2.02 m)	322 lb (146 kg)	35 1/2 in (0.90 m)	10 1/4 in (0.26 m)	5.31 s	1.90 s	3.06 s	4.85 s	28.0 in (0.71 m)	8 ft 5 in (2.57 m)	25 reps
All values from NFL Combine

Jenkins was selected by the Kansas City Chiefs in the first round (31st overall pick) of the 1995 NFL draft. He was the first offensive lineman the Chiefs selected in the first round since Brian Jozwiak in 1986.

Jenkins played in nine games for the Chiefs from 1995 to 1997. He was subsequently signed by the New Orleans Saints and the Minnesota Vikings.

== Career after football ==
In 1999, Jenkins and his wife, Dora, opened three franchise locations of Chicago's Harold's Chicken Shack throughout Detroit and Metro-Detroit.
