= Dale Carter =

American football player (born 1969)

No. 21, 24, 34, 40
- Position: Cornerback

Personal information
- Born: November 28, 1969 (age 56); Covington, Georgia, U.S.
- Listed height: 6 ft 1 in (1.85 m)
- Listed weight: 194 lb (88 kg)

Career information
- High school: Newton (Covington)
- College: Tennessee
- NFL draft: 1992: 1st round, 20th overall pick

Career history
- Kansas City Chiefs (1992–1998); Denver Broncos (1999–2001); Minnesota Vikings (2001); New Orleans Saints (2002–2003); Baltimore Ravens (2004–2005)

Awards and highlights
- NFL Defensive Rookie of the Year (1992); 2× Second-team All-Pro (1995, 1996); 4× Pro Bowl (1994–1997); PFWA All-Rookie Team (1992); Consensus All-American (1991); Second-team All-American (1990); 2× First-team All-SEC (1990, 1991)

Career NFL statistics
- Interceptions: 24
- Interception return yards: 256
- Touchdowns: 1
- Stats at Pro Football Reference

Dale Lavelle Carter (born November 28, 1969) is an American former professional football player who was a cornerback in the National Football League (NFL). He played college football for the Tennessee Volunteers and was selected by the Kansas City Chiefs in the first round of the 1992 NFL draft with the 20th overall pick. He played in the NFL for the Chiefs, Denver Broncos, Minnesota Vikings, New Orleans Saints, and Baltimore Ravens.

== Professional career ==
Pre-draft measurables
| Height | Weight | Arm length | Hand span | Bench press |
|---|---|---|---|---|
| 6 ft 0 1/2 in (1.84 m) | 188 lb (85 kg) | 32 5/8 in (0.83 m) | 8 in (0.20 m) | 7 reps |
All values from NFL Combine

Carter was selected 20th overall as a cornerback by the Chiefs in the first round of the 1992 NFL draft out of the University of Tennessee.

In 1992, Carter was named the NFL Defensive Rookie of the Year. On Thanksgiving Day (November 23, 1995), Carter was ejected for kicking Michael Irvin of the Dallas Cowboys in a 24–12 loss at Texas Stadium.

After six seasons in Kansas City in which he shined on the field, but numerous off-the-field problems, Carter signed a four-year, $22.8 million contract with the Broncos in 1999, making him the NFL's highest-paid defensive back. After a poor year, Carter was suspended for the entire 2000 season due to a fourth substance abuse violation before being released during the 2001 season. He then played for the Vikings, Saints, he missed the entire 2004 season due to a blood clot in his lung and then played for the Ravens before retiring after the 2005 season.

=== NFL statistics ===
| Year | Team | Games | Combined tackles | Tackles | Assisted tackles | Sacks | Forced fumbles | Fumble recoveries | Interceptions | Interception return yards | Yards per interception returns | Longest interception return | Interceptions returned for touchdown | Passes defended |
|---|---|---|---|---|---|---|---|---|---|---|---|---|---|---|
| 1992 | KC | 16 | 55 | 39 | 16 | 0.0 | 0 | 2 | 7 | 65 | 9 | 36 | 1 | 0 |
| 1993 | KC | 15 | 47 | 43 | 4 | 0.0 | 1 | 0 | 1 | 0 | 0 | 0 | 0 | 11 |
| 1994 | KC | 16 | 79 | 76 | 3 | 0.0 | 2 | 0 | 2 | 24 | 12 | 24 | 0 | 11 |
| 1995 | KC | 16 | 52 | 47 | 5 | 0.0 | 0 | 1 | 4 | 45 | 11 | 29 | 0 | 17 |
| 1996 | KC | 14 | 50 | 41 | 9 | 0.0 | 1 | 1 | 3 | 17 | 6 | 17 | 0 | 18 |
| 1997 | KC | 16 | 56 | 49 | 7 | 0.0 | 0 | 0 | 2 | 9 | 5 | 9 | 0 | 7 |
| 1998 | KC | 11 | 38 | 30 | 8 | 0.0 | 1 | 0 | 2 | 23 | 12 | 23 | 0 | 5 |
| 1999 | DEN | 14 | 72 | 54 | 18 | 0.0 | 0 | 0 | 2 | 48 | 24 | 34 | 0 | 12 |
| 2001 | MIN | 9 | 33 | 24 | 9 | 0.0 | 0 | 0 | 0 | 0 | 0 | 0 | 0 | 5 |
| 2002 | NO | 7 | 30 | 26 | 4 | 0.0 | 0 | 0 | 1 | 25 | 25 | 25 | 0 | 8 |
| 2003 | NO | 8 | 24 | 22 | 2 | 1.0 | 0 | 0 | 0 | 0 | 0 | 0 | 0 | 1 |
| 2005 | BAL | 15 | 25 | 22 | 3 | 0.0 | 1 | 0 | 0 | 0 | 0 | 0 | 0 | 1 |
| Total | Total | 157 | 506 | 434 | 72 | 1.0 | 6 | 2 | 24 | 256 | 11 | 36 | 1 | 96 |

== Personal life ==
Carter is the brother of Jake Reed, a former NFL wide receiver who played most notably for the Minnesota Vikings. They were teammates on the Vikings in the 2001 NFL season.

His son is former NFL safety/cornerback Nigel Warrior, and his nephew, Jake's son, is CFL/former NFL safety J.R. Reed.
