= 1997 San Diego Chargers season =

NFL team 38th season

- Owner: Alex Spanos
- General manager: Bobby Beathard
- Head coach: Kevin Gilbride
- Home stadium: Qualcomm Stadium

Results
- Record: 4–12
- Division place: 5th AFC West
- Playoffs: Did not qualify
- All-Pros: 2: WR/PR Eric Metcalf (1st team); LB Junior Seau (2nd team)
- Pro Bowlers: 2: WR/PR Eric Metcalf; LB Junior Seau

The 1997 San Diego Chargers season was the franchise's 28th season in the National Football League (NFL), its 38th overall and was the first season under Kevin Gilbride. With veteran first-string quarterback Stan Humphries missing half the season, the Chargers struggled and failed to improve on their 8–8 record from 1996. Backup quarterback Craig Whelihan went winless in seven starts, with the result that the Chargers lost their final eight games after a 4–4 start and scored only one touchdown in their final three games. The team finished with a 4–12 record and missed the playoffs for the second consecutive season.

San Diego struggled with Gilbride's new offensive system. Humphries posted a QB rating of 70.8, his worst as a Charger; none of the other three quarterbacks who saw action managed better than 60.6, and the number of sacks given up leapt from 33 to 51, with Whelihan taking 21 of them. Tony Martin was again the leading receiver, but fell short of 1,000 yards for the first time in three seasons. The running game improved slightly. Gary Brown gained 945 yards, but was inconsistent: his top two yardage totals were 181 and 169, but he only reached 60 yards in one other game. From San Diego's season tally of 27 touchdowns, only 17 were scored by the offense, a new club record low. Changes to the offensive line may have contributed to these struggles, with Eric Moten and Harry Swayne both having departed during the offseason.

On defense, linebacker Junior Seau led the team with 7.0 sacks. However, his six-season run as the top tackler was ended by Rodney Harrison, who had a superb all-round year at strong safety: 4.0 sacks, 132 tackles, touchdowns on an interception return, a fumble recovery and a kickoff return. New signing Eric Metcalf ran three punts back for touchdowns.

The team's stadium, Qualcomm Stadium, hosted Super Bowl XXXII at the end of the season.

== Offseason ==
=== NFL draft ===
1997 San Diego Chargers draft
Round	Pick	Player	Position	College	Notes
2	45	Freddie Jones	Tight end	North Carolina	
3	74	Michael Hamilton	Linebacker	North Carolina A&T	
4	109	Raleigh Roundtree	Guard	South Carolina State	
5	138	Kenny Bynum	Running back	South Carolina State	
5	146	Paul Bradford	Cornerback	Portland State	
6	178	Daniel Palmer	Center	Air Force	
7	218	Toran James	Linebacker	North Carolina A&T	
7	237	Tony Corbin	Quarterback	Sacramento State	
Made roster † Pro Football Hall of Fame * Made at least one Pro Bowl during career

=== Undrafted free agents ===
1997 undrafted free agents of note
Player	Position	College
Mike Maslowski	Linebacker	Wisconsin–La Crosse

== Personnel ==
=== Staff ===
1997 San Diego Chargers staff
Front office: Chairman of the board – Alex Spanos; President/vice chairman – Dean Spanos; General manager – Bobby Beathard; Director of player personnel – Billy Devaney; Director of pro personnel – Rudy Feldman; Coordinator of football operations – Marty Hurney; Head coaches: Head coach – Kevin Gilbride; Assistant head coach – Nick Nicolau; Offensive coaches: Offensive coordinator – Mike Sheppard; Running backs – Ollie Wilson; Wide receivers – Tyrone Dixon; Tight ends – Bill MacDermott; Offensive line – George DeLeone; Offensive assistant – Mike Cavanaugh	Defensive coaches: Defensive coordinator – Joe Pascale; Defensive line – Wayne Nunnely; Linebackers – Jim Vechiarella; Defensive backs – Rod Perry; Defensive assistant – Kevin Lempa; Special teams coaches: Special teams – Frank Novak; Strength and conditioning: Strength and conditioning – John Hastings

=== Roster ===
1997 San Diego Chargers roster
Quarterbacks (QB): 15 Todd Philcox; 8 Casey Weldon; 5 Craig Whelihan; Running backs (RB): 33 Gary Brown; 43 Kenny Bynum; 32 Robert Chancey; 34 Aaron Craver; Wide receivers (WR): 84 Ray Crittenden; 82 Charlie Jones; 81 Tony Martin; 21 Eric Metcalf; 85 Latario Rachal; 17 Anthony Rodgers; 80 Bryan Still; Tight ends (TE): 89 Frank Hartley; 83 Bryan Jennings; 86 Shannon Mitchell	Offensive linemen (OL): 75 Tony Berti T; 69 Ben Bordelon G; 63 Joe Cocozzo G; 60 Greg Engel C; 63 Raleigh McKenzie C; 66 Jim Mills G; 70 Vaughn Parker T; 79 Marcus Price T; 74 Raleigh Roundtree T; 65 Troy Sienkiewicz G; Defensive linemen (DL): 90 Marco Coleman DE; 95 William Fuller DE; 96 Norman Hand DT; 99 Raylee Johnson DE; 98 Shawn Lee DT; 94 Mike Mohring DT; 97 John Parrella DT; 91 Van Tuinei DE	Linebackers (LB): 52 James Burgess MLB; 58 Lewis Bush MLB; 53 Michael Hamilton OLB; 59 Toran James OLB; 56 Patrick Sapp OLB; 55 Junior Seau OLB; Defensive backs (DB): 25 Paul Bradford CB; 22 Dorian Brew CB; 20 Mike Dumas FS; 37 Rodney Harrison SS; 29 Terrance Shaw CB; 27 Michael Swift CB; 23 Gerome Williams SS; Special teams (ST): 2 Darren Bennett P; 50 David Binn LS; 7 Greg Davis K	Practice squad: 44 Joe DiBernardo LB; 26 Rodney Filer FB; 38 Eric Vance CB; 53 active, 15 inactive, 3 practice squad Reserve: 3 John Carney K (IR); 93 Reuben Davis DT (IR); 11 Jim Everett QB (IR); 41 Terrell Fletcher RB (IR); 54 Kurt Gouveia LB (IR); 28 Dwayne Harper CB (IR); 57 Bobby Houston LB (IR); 12 Stan Humphries QB (IR); 42 Greg Jackson S (IR); 88 Freddie Jones TE (IR); 40 Mark Montreuil S (IR); 68 Dan Palmer T (Military); 51 Pulu Poumele T (IR); 87 Brian Roche TE (IR); 46 Johnny Thomas CB (IR); Rookies in italics

== Preseason ==
Week	Date	Opponent	Result	Record	Venue	Attendance
1	August 2	San Francisco 49ers	W 20–13	1–0	Qualcomm Stadium	
2	August 9	Indianapolis Colts	W 23–17	2–0	Qualcomm Stadium	
3	August 16	at Tennessee Oilers	W 21–7	3–0	Liberty Bowl Memorial Stadium	
4	August 22	at Minnesota Vikings	L 22–28	3–1	Hubert H. Humphrey Metrodome	

== Regular season ==
=== Schedule ===
Week	Date	Opponent	Result	Record	Venue	Attendance
1	August 31	at New England Patriots	**L** 7–41	0–1	Foxboro Stadium	60,190
2	September 7	at New Orleans Saints	**W** 20–6	1–1	Louisiana Superdome	65,760
3	September 14	Carolina Panthers	**L** 7–26	1–2	Qualcomm Stadium	63,149
4	September 21	at **Seattle Seahawks**	**L** 22–26	1–3	Kingdome	51,110
5	September 28	Baltimore Ravens	**W** 21–17	2–3	Qualcomm Stadium	54,094
6	October 5	at **Oakland Raiders**	**W** 25–10	3–3	Oakland–Alameda County Coliseum	43,648
7	Bye					
8	October 16	at **Kansas City Chiefs**	**L** 3–31	3–4	Arrowhead Stadium	77,196
9	October 26	Indianapolis Colts	**W** 35–19	4–4	Qualcomm Stadium	63,177
10	November 2	at Cincinnati Bengals	**L** 31–38	4–5	Cinergy Field	53,754
11	November 9	**Seattle Seahawks**	**L** 31–37	4–6	Qualcomm Stadium	64,616
12	November 16	**Oakland Raiders**	**L** 13–38	4–7	Qualcomm Stadium	65,714
13	November 23	at San Francisco 49ers	**L** 10–17	4–8	3Com Park	61,195
14	November 30	**Denver Broncos**	**L** 28–38	4–9	Qualcomm Stadium	54,245
15	December 7	Atlanta Falcons	**L** 3–14	4–10	Qualcomm Stadium	46,317
16	December 14	**Kansas City Chiefs**	**L** 7–29	4–11	Qualcomm Stadium	54,594
17	December 21	at **Denver Broncos**	**L** 3–38	4–12	Mile High Stadium	69,632
Note: Intra-division opponents are in **bold** text.

=== Game summaries ===
==== Week 1: at New England Patriots ====
Week One: San Diego Chargers at New England Patriots – Game summary

Quarter	1	2	3	4	Total
Chargers	0	0	7	0	**7**
**Patriots**	14	17	0	10	**41**

at Foxboro, Foxborough, Massachusetts

- Date: August 31
- Game time: 1:00 p.m. EDT
- Game weather: 67 °F (19.4 °C), relative humidity 85%, wind 8 mph
- Game attendance: 60,190
- Referee: Bernie Kukar
- TV announcers (NBC): Marv Albert and Randy Cross
- Box score

Game information

**First quarter**

- NE – Ben Coates 4-yard pass from Drew Bledsoe (Adam Vinatieri kick), 9:59. Patriots 7–0. **Drive: 10 plays, 73 yards, 5:01.**
- NE – Terry Glenn 25-yard pass from Drew Bledsoe (Adam Vinatieri kick), 2:44. Patriots 14–0. **Drive: 4 plays, 67 yards, 2:01.**

**Second quarter**

- NE – Adam Vinatieri 21-yard field goal, 9:46. Patriots 17–0. **Drive: 8 plays, 56 yards, 3:47.**
- NE – Sam Gash 12-yard pass from Drew Bledsoe (Adam Vinatieri kick), 3:51. Patriots 24–0. **Drive: 6 plays, 70 yards, 3:34.**
- NE – Keith Byars 2-yard pass from Drew Bledsoe (Adam Vinatieri kick), 0:37. Patriots 31–0. **Drive: 5 plays, 45 yards, 1:27.**

**Third quarter**

- SDG – Freddie Jones 44-yard pass from Stan Humphries (John Carney kick), 11:42. Patriots 31–7. **Drive: 7 plays, 78 yards, 3:18.**

**Fourth quarter**

- NE – Adam Vinatieri 26-yard field goal, 11:27. Patriots 34–7. **Drive: 14 plays, 64 yards, 6:24.**
- NE – Willie Clay 53-yard interception return (Adam Vinatieri kick), 5:32. Patriots 41–7.

**Top passers**

- SDG – Stan Humphries – 12/26, 131 yards, TD
- NE – Drew Bledsoe – 26/39, 340 yards, 4 TD

**Top rushers**

- SDG – Gary Brown – 12 rushes, 49 yards
- NE – Curtis Martin – 22 rushes, 75 yards

**Top receivers**

- SDG – Freddie Jones – 4 receptions, 73 yards, TD
- NE – Shawn Jefferson – 5 receptions, 82 yards

For the second consecutive season, the Chargers took a beating from New England. Four touchdown passes from Drew Bledsoe had the Patriots cruising at halftime, up 31-0. Rookie tight end Freddie Jones made a fine one-handed grab for a 44-yard touchdown, but that was the lone Charger highlight. When Stan Humphries dislocated his shoulder trying to chase down a fumble, Jim Everett came in and threw a pick six to complete the scoring.

==== Week 2: at New Orleans Saints ====
Week Two: San Diego Chargers at New Orleans Saints – Game summary

Quarter	1	2	3	4	Total
**Chargers**	7	3	3	7	**20**
Saints	3	3	0	0	**6**

at Superdome, New Orleans, Louisiana

- Date: September 7
- Game time: 12:00 p.m. CDT
- Game weather: Dome
- Game attendance: 65,760
- Referee: Tom White
- TV announcers (NBC): Tom Hammond and Jim Kelly
- Box score

Game information

**First quarter**

- NO – Doug Brien 37-yard field goal, 9:43. Saints 3–0. **Drive: 9 plays, 28 yards, 4:17.**
- SDG – Rodney Harrison defensive fumble recovery in end zone (John Carney kick), 5:39. Chargers 7–3.

**Second quarter**

- NO – Doug Brien 31-yard field goal, 12:43. Chargers 7–6. **Drive: 12 plays, 66 yards, 7:56.**
- SDG – John Carney 37-yard field goal, 1:15. Chargers 10–6. **Drive: 9 plays, 80 yards, 2:27.**

**Third quarter**

- SDG – John Carney 34-yard field goal, 12:40. Chargers 13–6. **Drive: 4 plays, 7 yards, 1:25.**

**Fourth quarter**

- SDG – Freddie Jones 21-yard pass from Jim Everett (John Carney kick), 2:10. Chargers 20–6. **Drive: 7 plays, 52 yards, 3:35.**

**Top passers**

- SDG – Jim Everett – 17/29, 195 yards, TD, INT
- NO – Heath Shuler – 20/38, 194 yards, 3 INT

**Top rushers**

- SDG – Gary Brown – 21 rushes, 46 yards
- NO – Troy Davis – 10 rushes, 34 yards

**Top receivers**

- SDG – Eric Metcalf – 4 receptions, 65 yards
- NO – Randal Hill – 7 receptions, 63 yards

Six takeaways by the Charger defense helped backup QB Jim Everett beat the team who'd cut him during the offseason. In an error-filled game, San Diego went ahead when an errant pitch was missed by several players and chased back 30 yards into the Saints end zone, where Rodney Harrison recovered. Leading 13-6, Everett wasted an opportunity with a red zone interception, but found Freddie Jones with 2:10 to play for the clincher.

==== Week 3: vs. Carolina Panthers ====
Week Three: Carolina Panthers at San Diego Chargers – Game summary

Quarter	1	2	3	4	Total
**Panthers**	10	3	3	10	**26**
Chargers	7	0	0	0	**7**

at Qualcomm Stadium, San Diego, California

- Date: September 14
- Game time: 1:00 p.m. PDT
- Game weather: 74 °F (23.3 °C), relative humidity 71%, wind 7 mph
- Game attendance: 63,149
- Referee: Ed Hochuli
- TV announcers (FOX): Thom Brennaman and Ron Pitts

Game information

**First quarter**

- SDG – Erric Pegram 6-yard run (John Carney kick), 5:16. Chargers 7–0. **Drive: 3 plays, 65 yards, 0:36.**
- CAR – Wesley Walls 8-yard pass from Kerry Collins (John Kasay kick), 3:06. Tied 7–7. **Drive: 5 plays, 44 yards, 2:10.**
- CAR – John Kasay 25-yard field goal, 0:49. Panthers 10–7. **Drive: 4 plays, 4 yards, 1:00.**

**Second quarter**

- CAR – John Kasay 36-yard field goal, 7:45. Panthers 13–7. **Drive: 16 plays, 56 yards, 6:41.**

**Third quarter**

- CAR – John Kasay 34-yard field goal, 1:57. Panthers 16–7. **Drive: 10 plays, 34 yards, 4:40.**

**Fourth quarter**

- CAR – John Kasay 28-yard field goal, 14:05. Panthers 19–7. **Drive: 6 plays, 20 yards, 1:28.**
- CAR – Wesley Walls 1-yard pass from Kerry Collins (John Kasay kick), 10:08. Panthers 26–7. **Drive: 6 plays, 24 yards, 2:59.**

**Top passers**

- CAR – Kerry Collins – 17/36, 138 yards, 2 TD, INT
- SDG – Stan Humphries – 13/25, 145 yards

**Top rushers**

- CAR – Tim Biakabutuka – 12 rushes, 54 yards
- SDG – Gary Brown – 10 rushes, 35 yards

**Top receivers**

- CAR – Muhsin Muhammad – 4 receptions, 43 yards
- SDG – Tony Martin – 3 receptions, 75 yards

Humphries returned to the starting line-up, and began well, hitting Tony Martin deep for 59 yards to set up a touchdown for Erric Pegram. However, the Panthers needed only five plays to level the scores, and took control from there. Humphries was sacked seven times, and accounted for three of four lost fumbles for San Diego on the day.

The seven sacks conceded were the worst for San Diego since a replacement players game during the 1987 season.

==== Week 4: at Seattle Seahawks ====
Week Four: San Diego Chargers at Seattle Seahawks – Game summary

Quarter	1	2	3	4	Total
Chargers	0	16	0	6	**22**
**Seahawks**	3	10	0	13	**26**

at Kingdome, Seattle, Washington

- Date: September 21
- Game time: 1:00 p.m. PDT
- Game weather: Dome
- Game attendance: 51,110
- Referee: Gary Lane
- TV announcers (NBC): Mike Breen and James Lofton
- Box score

Game information

**First quarter**

- SEA – Todd Peterson 41-yard field goal, 10:19. Seahawks 3–0. **Drive: 6 plays, 38 yards, 2:55.**

**Second quarter**

- SDG – John Carney 22-yard field goal, 14:55. Tied 3–3. **Drive: 12 plays, 48 yards, 5:44.**
- SDG – Rodney Harrison 75-yard interception return (John Carney kick), 13:37. Chargers 10–3.
- SDG – John Carney 29-yard field goal, 7:13. Chargers 13–3. **Drive: 10 plays, 41 yards, 3:47.**
- SEA – Mack Strong 5-yard pass from Warren Moon (Todd Peterson kick), 3:34. Chargers 13–10. **Drive: 8 plays, 85 yards, 3:39.**
- SEA – Todd Peterson 37-yard field goal, 1:50. Tied 13–13. **Drive: 5 plays, 7 yards, 1:28.**
- SDG – John Carney 26-yard field goal, 0:11. Chargers 16–13. **Drive: 11 plays, 61 yards, 1:39.**

**Third quarter**

- SDG – No scoring play.

**Fourth quarter**

- SDG – John Carney 41-yard field goal, 13:42. Chargers 19–13. **Drive: 4 plays, 1 yard, 1:49.**
- SEA – Joey Galloway 53-yard pass from Warren Moon (Todd Peterson kick), 13:01. Seahawks 20–19. **Drive: 3 plays, 69 yards, 0:41.**
- SDG – John Carney 41-yard field goal, 5:21. Chargers 22–20. **Drive: 9 plays, 47 yards, 4:22.**
- SEA – Steve Broussard 1-yard run (pass failed), 1:22. Seahawks 26–22. **Drive: 9 plays, 80 yards, 3:59.**

**Top passers**

- SDG – Stan Humphries – 25/46, 239 yards, 3 INT
- SEA – Warren Moon – 17/34, 252 yards, 2 TD, 2 INT

**Top rushers**

- SDG – Gary Brown – 16 rushes, 46 yards
- SEA – Steve Broussard – 11 rushes, 72 yards, TD

**Top receivers**

- SDG – Tony Martin – 5 receptions, 62 yards
- SEA – Joey Galloway – 5 receptions, 106 yards, TD

The Chargers paid for an inability to score on offense, three times settling for field goals after driving inside the Seattle ten. Rodney Harrison scored the lone San Diego touchdown, jumping the route on a Warren Moon pass and going 75 yards untouched for a 10-3 lead. San Diego should have doubled that lead, but officials incorrectly ruled an Eric Metcalf touchdown as an incomplete pass, and they had to settle for the second of John Carney's five field goals.

Daryll Williams picked off Humphries three times, the most crucial coming in the third quarter, with San Diego in position to extend a 16-13 lead. A Terrence Shaw interception later led to a field goal, but Moon found Joey Galloway for a 51-yard touchdown to put Seattle ahead. Another Moon turnover, this time a fumble recovered by Harrison, set up Carney's fifth field goal, edging the Chargers ahead 22-20 with 5:21 to play. However, Seattle then drove 80 yards for the winning touchdown with 1:22 on the clock, San Diego failing to make a first down on their final possession.

==== Week 5: vs. Baltimore Ravens ====
Week Five: Baltimore Ravens at San Diego Chargers – Game summary

Quarter	1	2	3	4	Total
Ravens	3	3	11	0	**17**
**Chargers**	7	7	7	0	**21**

at Qualcomm Stadium, San Diego, California

- Date: September 28
- Game time: 1:00 p.m. PDT
- Game weather: 73 °F (22.8 °C), relative humidity 83%, wind 6 mph
- Game attendance: 54,094
- Referee: Gerry Austin
- TV announcers (NBC): Joel Meyers and Randy Cross
- Box score

Game information

**First quarter**

- SDG – Tony Martin 36-yard pass from Stan Humphries (Greg Davis kick), 6:27. Chargers 7–0. **Drive: 6 plays, 72 yards, 3:13.**
- BAL – Matt Stover 47-yard field goal, 2:24. Chargers 7–3. **Drive: 11 plays, 25 yards, 4:03.**

**Second quarter**

- SDG – Tony Martin 72-yard pass from Stan Humphries (Greg Davis kick), 7:56. Chargers 14–3. **Drive: 2 plays, 73 yards, 0:35.**
- BAL – Matt Stover 35-yard field goal, 0:29. Chargers 14–6. **Drive: 9 plays, 43 yards, 3:49.**

**Third quarter**

- BAL – Matt Stover 28-yard field goal, 11:22. Chargers 14–9. **Drive: 9 plays, 64 yards, 3:38.**
- BAL – Jermaine Lewis 37-yard pass from Vinny Testaverde (Michael Jackson pass from Vinny Testaverde), 6:00. Ravens 17–14. **Drive: 8 plays, 77 yards, 3:39.**
- SDG – Tony Martin 38-yard pass from Stan Humphries (Greg Davis kick), 0:03. Chargers 21–17. **Drive: 3 plays, 54 yards, 1:08.**

**Fourth quarter**

- No scoring plays.

**Top passers**

- BAL – Vinny Testaverde – 18/42, 228 yards, TD, 2 INT
- SDG – Stan Humphries – 17/26, 358 yards, 3 TD, 2 INT

**Top rushers**

- BAL – Bam Morris – 17 rushes, 81 yards
- SDG – Gary Brown – 18 rushes, 58 yards

**Top receivers**

- BAL – Jermaine Lewis – 2 receptions, 70 yards, TD
- SDG – Tony Martin – 4 receptions, 155 yards, 3 TD

A trio of long touchdown passes brought the Chargers a much-needed win. Humphries connected Tony Martin for a 36-yard touchdown in the first quarter; after a Ravens field goal, Eric Metcalf's 62-yard reception had San Diego knocking on the door again, but Humphries threw an end zone interception. He soon made amends, finding Martin wide open behind the defense for a 72-yard score.

John Carney was out for the season with a knee injury; his replacement Greg Davis missed from 49 yards out midway through the second quarter, and the tide began to turn. Baltimore scored two field goals, a touchdown and a two-point conversion over their next three possessions, and led 17-14. The Chargers reached 1st and goal at the 6 in response, but Humphries again threw an interception. On their next possession, San Diego had a lucky break, the officials missing a fumble by Terrell Fletcher. On the very next play, the Humphries-to-Martin connection struck again from 38 yards out. 4th quarter interceptions by Mike Dumas and Dwayne Harper prevented a Ravens comeback.

Humphries finished on 17 of 26 for a career-high 358 yards, 3 touchdowns and 2 interceptions. Martin caught all three touchdowns, his first of the season, and gained 155 yards on just 4 receptions.

==== Week 6: at Oakland Raiders ====
Week Six: San Diego Chargers at Oakland Raiders – Game summary

Quarter	1	2	3	4	Total
**Chargers**	6	3	10	6	**25**
Raiders	0	3	7	0	**10**

at Oakland-Alameda County Coliseum, Oakland, California

- Date: October 5
- Game time: 1:00 p.m. PDT
- Game weather: 67 °F (19.4 °C), relative humidity 56%, wind 10 mph
- Game attendance: 43,648
- Referee: Ron Blum
- TV announcers (NBC): Dick Enberg, Paul Maguire and Phil Simms
- Box score

Game information

**First quarter**

- SDG – Greg Davis 30-yard field goal, 9:19. Chargers 3–0. **Drive: 4 plays, -2 yards, 1:31.**
- SDG – Greg Davis 22-yard field goal, 3:13. Chargers 6–0. **Drive: 10 plays, 65 yards, 4:52.**

**Second quarter**

- SDG – Greg Davis 38-yard field goal, 7:59. Chargers 9–0. **Drive: 10 plays, 46 yards, 4:33.**
- OAK – Cole Ford 24-yard field goal, 0:00. Chargers 9–3. **Drive: 14 plays, 86 yards, 3:19.**

**Third quarter**

- SDG – Greg Davis 43-yard field goal, 11:04. Chargers 12–3. **Drive: 9 plays, 54 yards, 3:56.**
- OAK – Napoleon Kaufman 70-yard pass from Jeff George (Cole Ford kick), 10:03. Chargers 12–10. **Drive: 3 plays, 71 yards, 1:01.**
- SDG – Gary Brown 1-yard run (Greg Davis kick), 5:43. Chargers 19–10. **Drive: 9 plays, 80 yards, 4:20.**

**Fourth quarter**

- SDG – Greg Davis 33-yard field goal, 6:07. Chargers 22–10. **Drive: 9 plays, 29 yards, 4:16.**
- SDG – Greg Davis 33-yard field goal, 2:34. Chargers 25–10. **Drive: 6 plays, 18 yards, 2:13.**

**Top passers**

- SDG – Stan Humphries – 18/33, 226 yards
- OAK – Jeff George – 19/42, 271 yards, TD

**Top rushers**

- SDG – Gary Brown – 36 rushes, 181 yards, TD
- OAK – Napoleon Kaufman – 11 rushes, 13 yards, TD

**Top receivers**

- SDG – Tony Martin – 5 receptions, 75 yards
- OAK – Napoleon Kaufman – 3 receptions, 100 yards, TD

Gary Brown and Greg Davis propelled San Diego to their 6th win in the past 7 road games against the Raiders. Three Davis field goals had the Chargers up 9-0 approaching halftime. A 36-yard pass interference penalty on Terrence Shaw then set the Raiders up with first and goal at the 1, but Jeff George missed on three passes, and Oakland had to settle for a field goal. It was 12-3 early in the second half before Napoleon Kaufman took a short pass from George and broke away for a 70-yard touchdown.

The Chargers soon restored their nine-point advantage. Brown broke off runs of 17 and 32 yards on the next drive, and finished it off with a 1 yard TD run. Seau later ended a threat by sacking George, forcing a fumble that John Parrella recovered, setting up the fifth of Davis' six field goals.

Brown, who had been out of the NFL since the Oilers cut him in 1995, finished on 186 yards from a career-high 36 carries.

==== Week 8: at Kansas City Chiefs ====
Week Eight: San Diego Chargers at Kansas City Chiefs – Game summary

Quarter	1	2	3	4	Total
Chargers	0	0	3	0	**3**
**Chiefs**	7	17	0	7	**31**

at Arrowhead Stadium, Kansas City, Missouri

- Date: October 16
- Game time: 7:00 p.m. CDT
- Game weather: 57 °F (13.9 °C), relative humidity 69%, wind 10 mph
- Game attendance: 77,196
- Referee: Dick Hantak
- TV announcers (TNT): Verne Lundquist, Pat Haden and Mark May
- Box score

Game information

**First quarter**

- KAN – Elvis Grbac 1-yard run (Pete Stoyanovich kick), 3:17. Chiefs 7–0. **Drive: 6 plays, 62 yards, 2:47.**

**Second quarter**

- KAN – Andre Rison 10-yard pass from Elvis Grbac (Pete Stoyanovich kick), 6:50. Chiefs 14–0. **Drive: 7 plays, 54 yards, 3:49.**
- KAN – Andre Rison 5-yard pass from Elvis Grbac (Pete Stoyanovich kick), 2:21. Chiefs 21–0. **Drive: 6 plays, 36 yards, 2:21.**
- KAN – Pete Stoyanovich 45-yard field goal, 0:02. Chiefs 24–0. **Drive: 7 plays, 32 yards, 0:41.**

**Third quarter**

- SDG – Greg Davis 26-yard field goal, 0:37. Chiefs 24–3. **Drive: 14 plays, 61 yards, 7:06.**

**Fourth quarter**

- KAN – Marcus Allen 6-yard run (Pete Stoyanovich kick), 10:34. Chiefs 31–3. **Drive: 6 plays, 29 yards, 3:32.**

**Top passers**

- SDG – Jim Everett – 9/25, 137 yards, 2 INT
- KAN – Elvis Grbac – 20/40, 235 yards, 2 TD

**Top rushers**

- SDG – Gary Brown – 12 rushes, 59 yards
- KAN – Marcus Allen – 7 rushes, 29 yards, TD

**Top receivers**

- SDG – Freddie Jones – 4 receptions, 81 yards
- KAN – Andre Rison – 8 receptions, 86 yards, 2 TD

San Diego were dominated in their first Thursday night game for 11 seasons. Kansas City eased to a 24-0 lead at halftime, and a 26-yard Greg Davis field goal was all that prevented a shutout. Stan Humphries was knocked out of the game with a concussion in the 1st quarter, and backup Jim Everett threw a pair of interceptions before third-stringer Craig Whelihan finished up the game; between them, the trio had only 14 completions in 43 attempts. The Chargers also gave up 19 penalties for 146 yards, both of which set club records.

==== Week 9: vs. Indianapolis Colts ====
Week Nine: Indianapolis Colts at San Diego Chargers – Game summary

Quarter	1	2	3	4	Total
Colts	0	0	6	13	**19**
**Chargers**	3	9	14	9	**35**

at Qualcomm Stadium, San Diego, California

- Date: October 26
- Game time: 1:00 p.m. PST
- Game weather: 66 °F (18.9 °C), relative humidity 31%, wind 7 mph
- Game attendance: 63,177
- Referee: Phil Luckett
- TV announcers (NBC): Dan Hicks and Jim Kelly
- Box score

Game information

**First quarter**

- SDG – Greg Davis 45-yard field goal, 6:45. Chargers 3–0. **Drive: 9 plays, 40 yards, 4:07.**

**Second quarter**

- SDG – Greg Davis 35-yard field goal, 14:49. Chargers 6–0. **Drive: 9 plays, 63 yards, 4:06.**
- SDG – Greg Davis 34-yard field goal, 5:52. Chargers 9–0. **Drive: 12 plays, 65 yards, 5:14.**
- SDG – Greg Davis 31-yard field goal, 0:11. Chargers 12–0. **Drive: 11 plays, 67 yards, 1:48.**

**Third quarter**

- SDG – Gary Brown 1-yard run (Greg Davis kick), 7:29. Chargers 19–0. **Drive: 10 plays, 70 yards, 4:47.**
- IND – Sean Dawkins 36-yard pass from Paul Justin (pass failed), 6:09. Chargers 19–6. **Drive: 4 plays, 73 yards, 1:20.**
- SDG – Frank Hartley 2-yard pass from Stan Humphries (Greg Davis kick), 1:58. Chargers 26–6. **Drive: 9 plays, 76 yards, 4:11.**

**Fourth quarter**

- SDG – Greg Davis 45-yard field goal, 10:31. Chargers 29–6. **Drive: 6 plays, 20 yards, 2:37.**
- IND – Aaron Bailey 10-yard pass from Paul Justin (Cary Blanchard kick), 5:34. Chargers 29–13. **Drive: 9 plays, 63 yards, 4:57.**
- IND – Ray McElroy 42-yard blocked field goal return (pass failed), 2:17. Chargers 29–19.
- SDG – Rodney Harrison 40-yard kickoff return (kick blocked), 2:09. Chargers 35–19.

**Top passers**

- IND – Paul Justin – 20/39, 243 yards, 2 TD, 2 INT
- SDG – Stan Humphries – 21/34, 229 yards, TD

**Top rushers**

- IND – Lamont Warren – 3 rushes, 11 yards
  IND – Marshall Faulk – 8 rushes, 11 yards
- SDG – Gary Brown – 28 rushes, 169 yards, TD

**Top receivers**

- IND – Sean Dawkins – 5 receptions, 84 yards, TD
- SDG – Tony Martin – 6 receptions, 61 yards

The Chargers levelled their record at 4-4 with victory over the winless Colts. After four Davis field goals accounted for all the first half scoring, the game woke up in the 3rd quarter; Gary Brown broke off a 31-yard run to set up his own one-yard score, after a Colts reply, Stan Humphries threw the last touchdown pass of his career, a two-yarder to Frank Hartley. The Chargers were up 29-13 late on when Davis had his attempt at a sixth field blocked and run back for a touchdown; San Diego prevented a two-point conversion and Harrison then ran an onside kick attempt back 40 yards for a touchdown to complete the scoring.

Brown had 169 yards on 28 carries. It was the third time in the season San Diego scored five or more field goals, tying a dubious record set by the Minnesota Vikings eight seasons previously.

The result appeared more significant at the end of the season, as San Diego finished 4-12, while the Colts were 3-13, giving them the first pick in the 1998 NFL draft.

==== Week 10: at Cincinnati Bengals ====
Week Ten: San Diego Chargers at Cincinnati Bengals – Game summary

Quarter	1	2	3	4	Total
Chargers	7	10	0	14	**31**
**Bengals**	0	24	7	7	**38**

at Cinergy Field, Cincinnati, Ohio

- Date: November 2
- Game time: 1:00 p.m. EST
- Game weather: 46 °F (7.8 °C), relative humidity 79%, wind 13 mph
- Game attendance: 53,754
- Referee: Walt Coleman
- TV announcers (NBC): Jim Donovan and Bob Trumpy
- Box score

Game information

**First quarter**

- SDG – Gary Brown 1-yard run (Greg Davis kick), 3:17. Chiefs 7–0. **Drive: 6 plays, 62 yards, 2:47.**

**Second quarter**

- CIN – Doug Pelfrey 27-yard field goal, 6:50. Chiefs 14–0. **Drive: 7 plays, 54 yards, 3:49.**
- CIN – Carl Pickens 15-yard pass from Jeff Blake (Doug Pelfrey kick), 2:21. Chiefs 21–0. **Drive: 6 plays, 36 yards, 2:21.**
- SDG – Eric Metcalf 85-yard punt return (Greg Davis kick), 0:02. Chiefs 24–0. **Drive: 7 plays, 32 yards, 0:41.**
- CIN – Brian Milne 2-yard run (Doug Pelfrey kick), 6:50. Chiefs 14–0. **Drive: 7 plays, 54 yards, 3:49.**
- CIN – John Copeland 25-yard defensive fumble return (Doug Pelfrey kick), 2:21. Chiefs 21–0. **Drive: 6 plays, 36 yards, 2:21.**
- SDG – Greg Davis 45-yard field goal, 0:37. Chiefs 24–3. **Drive: 14 plays, 61 yards, 7:06.**

**Third quarter**

- CIN – Corey Dillon 71-yard run (Doug Pelfrey kick), 6:50. Chiefs 14–0. **Drive: 7 plays, 54 yards, 3:49.**

**Fourth quarter**

- SDG – Eric Metcalf 67-yard punt return (Greg Davis kick), 0:02. Chiefs 24–0. **Drive: 7 plays, 32 yards, 0:41.**
- CIN – Jeff Blake 13-yard run (Doug Pelfrey kick), 0:02. Chiefs 24–0. **Drive: 7 plays, 32 yards, 0:41.**
- SDG – Charlie Jones 44-yard pass from Craig Whelihan (Greg Davis kick), 0:02. Chiefs 24–0. **Drive: 7 plays, 32 yards, 0:41.**

**Top passers**

- SDG – Stan Humphries – 12/25, 115 yards, INT
- CIN – Jeff Blake – 19/32, 172 yards, TD

**Top rushers**

- SDG – Gary Brown – 14 rushes, 34 yards, TD
- CIN – Corey Dillon – 19 rushes, 123 yards, TD

**Top receivers**

- SDG – Tony Martin – 7 receptions, 69 yards
- CIN – Darnay Scott – 6 receptions, 52 yards

San Diego lost both the game and their starting quarterback. They began well, with Gary Brown opening the scoring, and Eric Metcalf later making it 14-10 with an 85-yard punt return. A pair of Humphries errors turned the game in the 2nd quarter, an interception setting up one touchdown and a fumble being directly returned for another.

It was 24-17 to the Bengals in the 3rd quarter when Humphries was driven into the ground by Reinard Wilson, sustaining his second concussion in three games. This injury kept him out for the rest of the season, and he decided to retire early the next year.

With backup Jim Everett also out with an ankle injury, 3rd year pro Craig Whelihan came in for the rest of the game. The Bengals twice extended their lead to 14 points, and the Chargers pegged them back both times. Firstly, Metcalf ran another punt back for a score, this time from 67 yards out. Then Whelihan threw his first NFL touchdown pass, a 44-yarder to Charlie Jones. San Diego had two further possessions, but could not cross midfield.

It was the second time Metcalf had returned two kicks for scores in a single game. He became the first player to have ten total kick return touchdowns in a career (2 kickoffs, 8 punts).

==== Week 11: vs. Seattle Seahawks ====
Week Eleven: Seattle Seahawks at San Diego Chargers – Game summary

Quarter	1	2	3	4	Total
**Seahawks**	0	10	14	13	**37**
Chargers	14	3	7	7	**31**

at Qualcomm Stadium, San Diego, California

- Date: November 9
- Game time: 1:00 p.m. PST
- Game weather: 63 °F (17.2 °C), relative humidity 71%, wind 7 mph
- Game attendance: 64,616
- Referee: Bernie Kukar
- TV announcers (NBC): Don Criqui and Jim Mora
- Box score

Game information

**First quarter**

- SDG – Greg Jackson 41-yard fumble return (Greg Davis kick), 13:30. Chargers 7–0.
- SDG – Tony Martin 10-yard pass from Craig Whelihan (Greg Davis kick), 2:17. Chargers 14–0. **Drive: 7 plays, 31 yards, 4:12.**

**Second quarter**

- SEA – Todd Peterson 27-yard field goal, 6:58. Chargers 14–3. **Drive: 10 plays, 72 yards, 5:21.**
- SDG – Greg Davis 33-yard field goal, 1:16. Chargers 17–3. **Drive: 12 plays, 66 yards, 5:42.**
- SEA – Joey Galloway 30-yard pass from Warren Moon (Todd Peterson kick), 0:22. Chargers 17–10. **Drive: 7 plays, 60 yards, 0:54.**

**Third quarter**

- SEA – Chris Warren 1-yard run (Todd Peterson kick), 9:00. Tied 17–17. **Drive: 13 plays, 61 yards, 6:00.**
- SEA – Michael Sinclair defensive fumble recovery in end zone (Todd Peterson kick), 8:44. Seahawks 24–17.
- SDG – Paul Bradford 56-yard interception return (Greg Davis kick), 0:30. Tied 24–24.

**Fourth quarter**

- SDG – Tony Martin 61-yard pass from Craig Whelihan (Greg Davis kick), 11:20. Chargers 31–24. **Drive: 3 plays, 80 yards, 1:38.**
- SEA – Todd Peterson 28-yard field goal, 6:02. Chargers 31–27. **Drive: 11 plays, 64 yards, 5:18.**
- SEA – Joey Galloway 40-yard pass from Warren Moon (Todd Peterson kick), 2:20. Seahawks 34–31. **Drive: 7 plays, 73 yards, 1:55.**
- SEA – Todd Peterson 27-yard field goal, 1:18. Seahawks 37–31. **Drive: 4 plays, 6 yards, 0:28.**

**Top passers**

- SEA – Warren Moon – 24/45, 295 yards, 2 TD, INT
- SDG – Craig Whelihan – 17/29, 206 yards, 2 TD, INT

**Top rushers**

- SEA – Chris Warren – 16 rushes, 59 yards, TD
- SDG – Gary Brown – 18 rushes, 53 yards

**Top receivers**

- SEA – Joey Galloway – 3 receptions, 84 yards, 2 TD
- SDG – Tony Martin – 5 receptions, 100 yards, 2 TD

Craig Whelihan had some good moments in his first NFL start, but it wasn't enough for the win. Special team got the Chargers off to a fast start, Greg Jackson returning a fumbled punt for a touchdown. Whelihan then strung together 11 consecutive completions over three drives, including a 10-yard touchdown to Martin. A Davis field goal made it 17-3 late in the 2nd quarter.

Seattle responded with touchdown drives either side of halftime, then recovered a Whelihan fumble in the end zone for a 24-17 lead. Late in the third quarter, the tide turned again, when Paul Bradford picked off a Warren Moon pass and returned it 56 yards for a game-tying score. Early in the 4th quarter, Whelihan went deep for Martin, finding him from 61 yards out to put the Chargers back on top. However, Seattle came back once again, Moon's second touchdown pass coming between two field goals. San Diego's last chance ended when Whelihan was sacked on 4th and 6 from midfield.

The quarterback finished on 17 of 29 for 206 yards, 2 touchdowns and 1 interception. Martin caught 5 for exactly 100 yards, and the two scores.

==== Week 12: vs. Oakland Raiders ====
Week Twelve: Oakland Raiders at San Diego Chargers – Game summary

Quarter	1	2	3	4	Total
**Raiders**	7	14	14	3	**38**
Chargers	7	6	0	0	**13**

at Qualcomm Stadium, San Diego, California

- Date: November 16
- Game time: 5:00 p.m. PST
- Game weather: 61 °F (16.1 °C), relative humidity 72%, wind 6 mph
- Game attendance: 65,714
- Referee: Dale Hamer
- TV announcers (ESPN): Mike Patrick and Joe Theismann
- Box score

Game information

**First quarter**

- SDG – Greg Jackson 36-yard interception return (Greg Davis kick), 7:05. Chargers 7–0.
- OAK – Harvey Williams 8-yard pass from Jeff George (Cole Ford kick), 5:06. Tied 7–7. **Drive: 4 plays, 74 yards, 1:59.**

**Second quarter**

- OAK – Harvey Williams 1-yard run (Cole Ford kick), 12:48. Raiders 14–7. **Drive: 6 plays, 17 yards, 2:33.**
- SDG – Greg Davis 45-yard field goal, 9:10. Raiders 14–10. **Drive: 7 plays, 58 yards, 3:38.**
- OAK – James Jett 9-yard pass from Jeff George (Cole Ford kick), 5:17. Raiders 21–10. **Drive: 9 plays, 67 yards, 3:53.**
- SDG – Greg Davis 22-yard field goal, 0:26. Raiders 21–13. **Drive: 13 plays, 79 yards, 4:51.**

**Third quarter**

- OAK – Harvey Williams 1-yard run (Cole Ford kick), 7:04. Raiders 28–13. **Drive: 7 plays, 69 yards, 3:29.**
- OAK – Harvey Williams 32-yard pass from Jeff George (Cole Ford kick), 1:46. Raiders 35–13. **Drive: 6 plays, 49 yards, 3:05.**

**Fourth quarter**

- OAK – Cole Ford 23-yard field goal, 10:38. Raiders 38–13. **Drive: 6 plays, 16 yards, 2:09.**

**Top passers**

- OAK – Jeff George – 16/34, 226 yards, 3 TD, 2 INT
- SDG – Craig Whelihan – 14/26, 202 yards

**Top rushers**

- OAK – Napoleon Kaufman – 20 rushes, 109 yards
- SDG – Gary Brown – 21 rushes, 86 yards

**Top receivers**

- OAK – Harvey Williams – 3 receptions, 59 yards, 2 TD
- SDG – Charlie Jones – 3 receptions, 86 yards

A lack of punch on offense saw San Diego lose at home to the Raiders for the fifth time in seven seasons. Their defense got them off to the ideal start, Greg Jackson picking off Jeff George and going 36 yards for his second touchdown in as many weeks. However, Oakland needed only four plays to level the scores; a Whelihan fumble set them up for a 14-7 lead. San Diego moved the ball well on their next two drives, but both times had to settle for field goals, while the Raiders added another touchdown. It was 21-13 at the break, and Oakland added 17 unanswered points in the second half.

Running back Harvey Williams had two touchdowns rushing and two receiving, becoming the first Charger opponent to score four in one game since 1985.

==== Week 13: at San Francisco 49ers ====
Week Thirteen: San Diego Chargers at San Francisco 49ers – Game summary

Quarter	1	2	3	4	Total
Chargers	0	0	10	0	**10**
**49ers**	3	7	7	0	**17**

at 3Com Park, San Francisco, California

- Date: November 23
- Game time: 1:00 p.m. PST
- Game weather: 61 °F (16.1 °C), relative humidity 86%, wind 15 mph
- Game attendance: 61,195
- Referee: Ron Blum
- TV announcers (NBC): Dick Enberg, Paul Maguire and Phil Simms
- Box score

Game information

**First quarter**

- SF – Gary Anderson 29-yard field goal, 7:45. 49ers 3–0. **Drive: 6 plays, 23 yards, 1:59.**

**Second quarter**

- SF – Terrell Owens 37-yard pass from Steve Young (Gary Anderson kick), 0:28. 49ers 10–0. **Drive: 3 plays, 37 yards, 0:19.**

**Third quarter**

- SDG – Greg Davis 31-yard field goal, 11:13. 49ers 10–3. **Drive: 4 plays, 5 yards, 2:25.**
- SF – J. J. Stokes 3-yard pass from Steve Young (Gary Anderson kick), 6:53. 49ers 17–3. **Drive: 4 plays, 34 yards, 1:56.**
- SDG – Paul Bradford 78-yard defensive fumble return (Greg Davis kick), 2:53. 49ers 17–10.

**Fourth quarter**

- No scoring plays.

**Top passers**

- SDG – Craig Whelihan – 4/18, 81 yards, 3 INT
- SF – Steve Young – 20/30, 245 yards, 2 TD

**Top rushers**

- SDG – Kenny Bynum – 11 rushes, 64 yards
- SF – Garrison Hearst – 22 rushes, 87 yards

**Top receivers**

- SDG – Freddie Jones – 3 receptions, 48 yards
- SF – Terrell Owens – 4 receptions, 84 yards, TD

Despite a feeble offensive showing (8 first downs, 3 turnovers), San Diego ran the 10-1 49ers surprisingly close. The Chargers failed to cross midfield in the first half, but the defense managed to keep a 49ers attack featuring future Hall of Famers Steve Young and Terrell Owens largely in check, and the score was only 10-0 at the break. Early in the second half, a fumbled punt return set the Chargers up in the red zone, but they could muster only a field goal. A Whelihan interception set San Francisco up for a short touchdown drive; the quarterback's next pass was also intercepted, but San Diego's defense kept them in the game, rookie defensive back Paul Bradford returning a Garrison Hearst fumble 78 yards for a touchdown.

Whelihan was benched at this point - he had gone 4 of 18 for 81 yards and three interceptions, with a 6.2 passer rating. Recently-acquired veteran Todd Philcox came on for this first action since 1993, and promptly led the Chargers on their only substantial drive of the game, moving from their own 20 to San Francisco territory, and seeming to have scored on a Bryan Still reception. However, a false start wiped out the score, and Davis missed a field goal a few plays later. San Diego had two more possessions, but could cross midfield on neither of them.

==== Week 14: vs. Denver Broncos ====
Week Fourteen: Denver Broncos at San Diego Chargers – Game summary

Quarter	1	2	3	4	Total
**Broncos**	7	21	7	3	**38**
Chargers	0	7	7	14	**28**

at Qualcomm Stadium, San Diego, California

- Date: November 30
- Game time: 5:00 p.m. PST
- Game weather: 61 °F (16.1 °C), relative humidity 67%, wind 8 mph
- Game attendance: 54,245
- Referee: Gerry Austin
- TV announcers (ESPN): Mike Patrick and Joe Theismann
- Box score

Game information

**First quarter**

- DEN – Ed McCaffrey 4-yard pass from John Elway (Jason Elam kick), 4:56. Broncos 7–0. **Drive: 6 plays, 43 yards, 2:37.**

**Second quarter**

- DEN – Rod Smith 5-yard pass from John Elway (Jason Elam kick), 11:42. Broncos 14–0. **Drive: 10 plays, 74 yards, 4:42.**
- SDG – Tony Martin 4-yard pass from Craig Whelihan (Greg Davis kick), 5:51. Broncos 14–7. **Drive: 10 plays, 40 yards, 5:51.**
- DEN – Terrell Davis 5-yard run (Jason Elam kick), 1:15. Broncos 21–7. **Drive: 9 plays, 64 yards, 4:36.**
- DEN – Steve Atwater 22-yard interception return (Jason Elam kick), 1:01. Broncos 28–7.

**Third quarter**

- SDG – Eric Metcalf 83-yard punt return (Greg Davis kick), 12:41. Broncos 28–14.
- DEN – Ed McCaffrey 21-yard pass from John Elway (Jason Elam kick), 9:09. Broncos 35–14. **Drive: 8 plays, 75 yards, 3:32.**

**Fourth quarter**

- SDG – Gary Brown 1-yard run (Greg Davis kick), 6:19. Broncos 35–21. **Drive: 25 plays, 98 yards, 9:33.**
- DEN – Jason Elam 32-yard field goal, 4:16. Broncos 38–21. **Drive: 5 plays, 31 yards, 2:03.**
- SDG – Eric Metcalf 11-yard pass from Craig Whelihan (Greg Davis kick), 0:28. Broncos 38–28. **Drive: 15 plays, 67 yards, 3:48.**

**Top passers**

- DEN – John Elway – 20/33, 240 yards, 3 TD
- SDG – Craig Whelihan – 23/51, 222 yards, 2 TD, 2 INT

**Top rushers**

- DEN – Terrell Davis – 26 rushes, 178 yards, TD
- SDG – Gary Brown – 12 rushes, 21 yards, TD

**Top receivers**

- DEN – Ed McCaffrey – 7 receptions, 111 yards, 2 TD
- SDG – Tony Martin – 8 receptions, 78 yards, TD

San Diego lost to the division-leading Broncos in a game more one-sided than the final scoreline implied. Terrell Davis had 178 yards on the ground and 36 more through the air; he was the star performer as Denver moved serenely to a 35-14 lead early in the second half. Whelihan threw two picks, one being run back for a touchdown, but did manage to find Tony Martin for the receiver's 33rd and final touchdown as a Charger; Eric Metcalf provided another highlight when he went 83 yards for the record-breaking ninth punt return touchdown of his career.

Denver drove to the San Diego goal line, but turned the ball over on downs. The Chargers responded with an epic 25-play drive, covering 98 yards, featuring a pair of 4th down conversions and ending with Gary Brown's 1 yard run.

Following a failed onside kick attempt, Denver added a field goal. San Diego then had another long drive, this time covering 67 yards in 15 plays and scoring through a Metcalf reception. After a second onside kick was successful, the Chargers ran three more plays as time expired. This meant that San Diego had run 43 of the game's final 48 plays, having run only 30 out of 88 prior to that point. Their 25 plays on a single drive set an NFL record; they also tied the record for most plays in a single quarter, with 40 in the 4th.

==== Week 15: vs. Atlanta Falcons ====
Week Fifteen: Atlanta Falcons at San Diego Chargers – Game summary

Quarter	1	2	3	4	Total
**Falcons**	0	7	7	0	**14**
Chargers	0	0	3	0	**3**

at Qualcomm Stadium, San Diego, California

- Date: December 7
- Game time: 1:00 p.m. PST
- Game weather: 62 °F (16.7 °C), relative humidity 83%, wind 11 mph
- Game attendance: 46,317
- Referee: Tom White
- TV announcers (FOX): Thom Brennaman and Ron Pitts
- Box score

Game information

**First quarter**

- No scoring plays.

**Second quarter**

- ATL – Terance Mathis 19-yard pass from Chris Chandler (Morten Andersen kick), 14:10. Falcons 7–0. **Drive: 6 plays, 36 yards, 3:02.**

**Third quarter**

- ATL – Byron Hanspard 99-yard kickoff return (Morten Andersen kick), 14:41. Falcons 14–0.
- SDG – Greg Davis 37-yard field goal, 7:13. Falcons 14–3. **Drive: 14 plays, 52 yards, 7:28.**

**Fourth quarter**

- No scoring plays.

**Top passers**

- ATL – Chris Chandler – 10/23, 115 yards, TD, INT
- SDG – Craig Whelihan – 22/41, 259 yards, 3 INT

**Top rushers**

- ATL – Jamal Anderson – 22 rushes, 60 yards
- SDG – Gary Brown – 11 rushes, 24 yards

**Top receivers**

- ATL – Bert Emanuel – 3 receptions, 32 yards
  ATL – Todd Kinchen – 2 receptions, 32 yards
- SDG – Eric Metcalf – 8 receptions, 109 yards

The Chargers actually outgained Atlanta 268-204, but were foiled by a handful of key plays. On the game's first drive, they had a 2nd and 11 at the Atlanta 16, but Terrell Fletcher couldn't handle a Whelihan pass, deflected off his hands and was intercepted. A second interception set up Atlanta for the opening touchdown, and they doubled their lead when Byron Hanspard went 99 yards with the opening kickoff of the second half. San Diego wasted opportunities on their three remaining drives: from a 1st and goal at the 6, they settled for a field goal; on 3rd and goal at the 3, Whelihan threw another interception; a 42 yard field goal attempt was blocked.

Metcalf had 109 yards on 8 receptions. The paid attendance was the lowest for a Charger home game since the 1992 season.

==== Week 16: vs. Kansas City Chiefs ====
Week Sixteen: Kansas City Chiefs at San Diego Chargers – Game summary

Quarter	1	2	3	4	Total
**Chiefs**	7	7	8	7	**29**
Chargers	0	7	0	0	**7**

at Qualcomm Stadium, San Diego, California

- Date: December 14
- Game time: 1:00 p.m. PST
- Game weather: 58 °F (14.4 °C), relative humidity 52%, wind 7 mph
- Game attendance: 54,594
- Referee: Bernie Kukar
- TV announcers (NBC): Tom Hammond and Randy Cross
- Box score

Game information

**First quarter**

- KAN – Marcus Allen 1-yard run (Pete Stoyanovich kick), 3:02. Chiefs 7–0. **Drive: 8 plays, 80 yards, 3:10.**

**Second quarter**

- SDG – Eric Metcalf 14-yard pass from Craig Whelihan (Greg Davis kick), 14:09. Tied 7–7. **Drive: 9 plays, 53 yards, 3:53.**
- KAN – Lake Dawson 21-yard pass from Rich Gannon (Pete Stoyanovich kick), 8:05. Chiefs 14–7. **Drive: 6 plays, 59 yards, 2:14.**

**Third quarter**

- KAN – Pete Stoyanovich 40-yard field goal, 10:43. Chiefs 17–7. **Drive: 8 plays, 42 yards, 4:17.**
- KAN – Safety, Derrick Thomas sacked Todd Philcox in end zone, 5:41. Chiefs 19–7.
- KAN – Pete Stoyanovich 48-yard field goal, 1:42. Chiefs 22–7. **Drive: 9 plays, 34 yards, 3:59.**

**Fourth quarter**

- KAN – Mark McMillian 87-yard interception return (Pete Stoyanovich kick), 6:46. Chiefs 29–7.

**Top passers**

- KAN – Rich Gannon – 8/25, 116 yards, TD
- SDG – Craig Whelihan – 13/20, 137 yards, TD

**Top rushers**

- KAN – Marcus Allen – 8 rushes, 44 yards, TD
- SDG – Gary Brown – 16 rushes, 57 yards

**Top receivers**

- KAN – Andre Rison – 2 receptions, 52 yards
- SDG – Tony Martin – 7 receptions, 66 yards

As with the previous game, San Diego outgained the opposition - 282 yards to 239 this time - but floundered in opposition territory. After Whelihan found Metcalf to tie the scores at 7, six further Charger drives crossed midfield, but none produced points. Whelihan fumbled when sacked on a 3rd and 3 from the Kansas City 43, and was replaced by Todd Philcox, who was sacked by Derrick Thomas for a safety on his first drive. Later, with the score at 22-7, Philcox drove the team to a first down at the Chief 17, but threw a game-sealing pick six on the next play.

For the second time in the 1997 season, the Chargers gave up seven sacks.

==== Week 17: at Denver Broncos ====
Week Seventeen: San Diego Chargers at Denver Broncos – Game summary

Quarter	1	2	3	4	Total
Chargers	3	0	0	0	**3**
**Broncos**	0	24	7	7	**38**

at Mile High Stadium, Denver, Colorado

- Date: December 21
- Game time: 2:00 p.m. MST
- Game weather: 23 °F (−5.0 °C), relative humidity 80%, wind 6 mph, wind chill 16
- Game attendance: 69,632
- Referee: Jerry Markbreit
- TV announcers (NBC): Mike Breen and James Lofton
- Box score

Game information

**First quarter**

- SDG – Greg Davis 26-yard field goal, 3:29. Chargers 3–0. **Drive: 14 plays, 46 yards, 7:55.**

**Second quarter**

- DEN – Rod Smith 11-yard pass from John Elway (Jason Elam kick), 13:38. Broncos 7–3. **Drive: 10 plays, 60 yards, 4:51.**
- DEN – Rod Smith 15-yard pass from John Elway (Jason Elam kick), 9:05. Broncos 14–3. **Drive: 3 plays, 29 yards, 1:19.**
- DEN – Ed McCaffrey 1-yard pass from John Elway (Jason Elam kick), 4:09. Broncos 21–3. **Drive: 5 plays, 56 yards, 2:18.**
- DEN – Jason Elam 25-yard field goal, 0:13. Broncos 24–3. **Drive: 12 plays, 75 yards, 2:50.**

**Third quarter**

- DEN – Shannon Sharpe 68-yard pass from John Elway (Jason Elam kick), 14:37. Broncos 31–3. **Drive: 1 play, 68 yards, 0:23.**

**Fourth quarter**

- DEN – Derek Loville 6-yard run (Jason Elam kick), 4:35. Broncos 38–3. **Drive: 18 plays, 90 yards, 10:25.**

**Top passers**

- SDG – Craig Whelihan – 15/28, 147 yards, INT
- DEN – John Elway – 17/26, 273 yards, 4 TD, INT

**Top rushers**

- SDG – Kenny Bynum – 10 rushes, 34 yards
- DEN – Derek Loville – 14 rushes, 66 yards, TD

**Top receivers**

- SDG – Eric Metcalf – 3 receptions, 52 yards
- DEN – Shannon Sharpe – 8 receptions, 162 yards, TD

A forgettable defeat at the hands of the eventual Super Bowl champions closed out the Chargers' season. They took they lead with a Davis kick, and only trailed 7-3 when Junior Seau picked off a John Elway pass. However, Whelihan gave it straight back with an interception of his own, and it was already 31-3 a single play into the second half. The eight game losing streak was the club's worst in a single season since 1986.

== Standings ==
AFC West
	W	L	T	PCT	PF	PA	STK
^{(1)} Kansas City Chiefs	13	3	0	.813	375	232	W6
^{(4)} Denver Broncos	12	4	0	.750	472	287	W1
Seattle Seahawks	8	8	0	.500	365	362	W2
Oakland Raiders	4	12	0	.250	324	419	L5
San Diego Chargers	4	12	0	.250	266	425	L8

== Awards ==
Seau (as a backup linebacker) and Metcalf (as a kick returner) were the only Chargers in the AFC Pro Bowl squad. Metcalf was also named a first-team All-Pro by the Associated Press, with Seau in the second team.
