= Toub =

Toub is a surname. Notable people with the surname include:

- Dave Toub (born 1962), American football player and coach
- Shaun Toub (born 1958), Iranian-born American actor
