= Eric Metcalf =

American football player (born 1968)

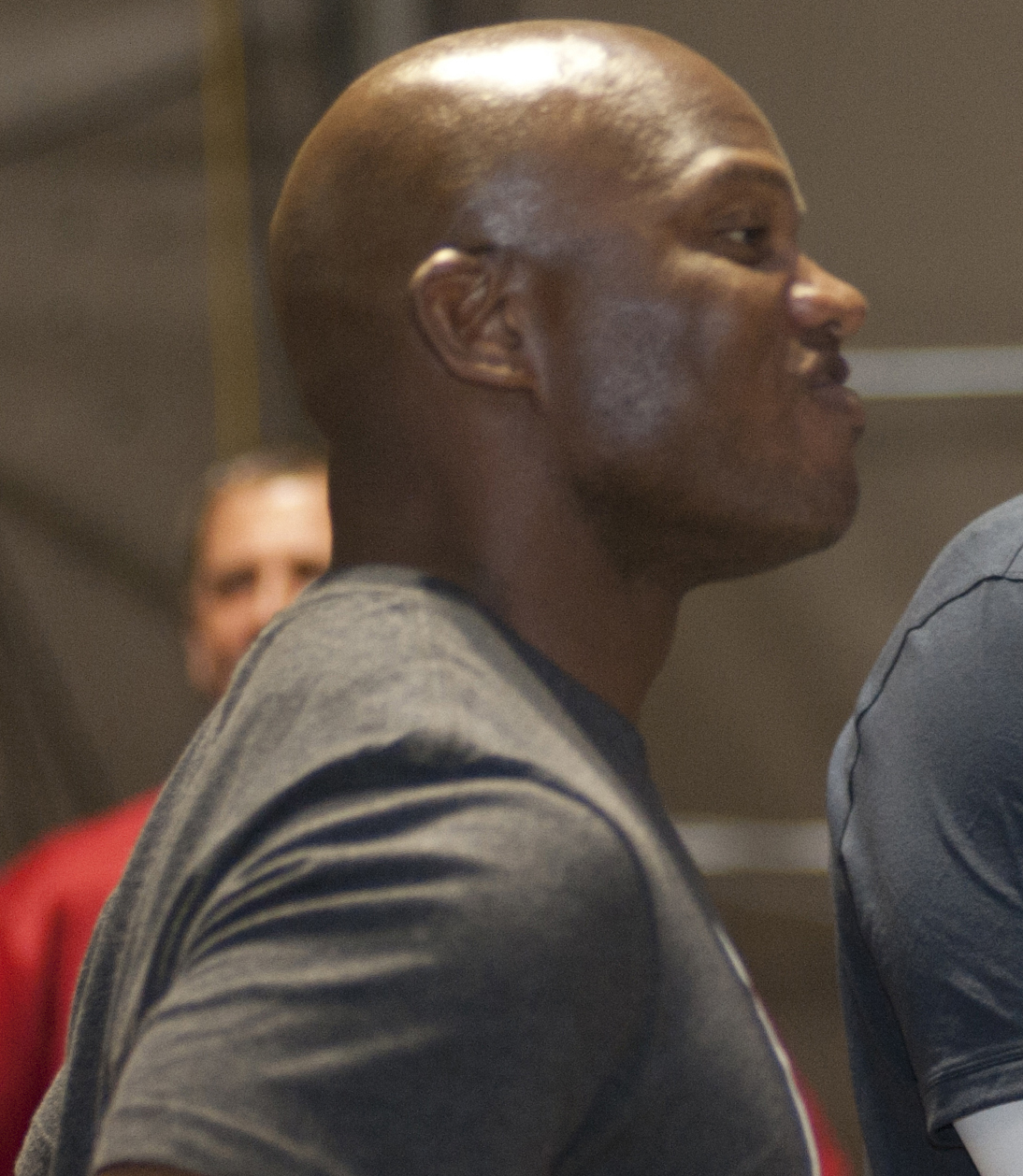
- Metcalf in 2013

No. 21, 82, 34, 22
- Positions: Running back, wide receiver, return specialist

Personal information
- Born: January 23, 1968 (age 58); Seattle, Washington, U.S.
- Listed height: 5 ft 10 in (1.78 m)
- Listed weight: 190 lb (86 kg)

Career information
- High school: Bishop Denis J. O'Connell (Arlington, Virginia)
- College: Texas
- NFL draft: 1989: 1st round, 13th overall pick

Career history
- Cleveland Browns (1989–1994); Atlanta Falcons (1995–1996); San Diego Chargers (1997); Arizona Cardinals (1998); Baltimore Ravens (1999)*; Carolina Panthers (1999); Oakland Raiders (2001)*; Washington Redskins (2001); Green Bay Packers (2002)
- * Offseason or practice squad member only

Awards and highlights
- 2× First-team All-Pro (1993, 1997); 3× Pro Bowl (1993, 1994, 1997); NFL kickoff return yards leader (1990); Cleveland Browns Legends; Second-team Football All-American (1987); SWC Offensive Player of the Year (1987); 3× First-team All-SWC (1986–1988)

Career NFL statistics
- Receptions: 541
- Receiving yards: 5,572
- Rushing yards: 2,392
- Return yards: 9,266
- Total touchdowns: 55
- Stats at Pro Football Reference

Eric Quinn Metcalf (born January 23, 1968) is an American former professional football player in the National Football League (NFL) for the Cleveland Browns, Atlanta Falcons, San Diego Chargers, Arizona Cardinals, Carolina Panthers, Washington Redskins and Green Bay Packers. He was a three-time Pro Bowl selection for the Browns and the Chargers. He was also the 1988 US Track and Field Champion in the long jump and a two-time NCAA Champion in the same event at Texas. His father Terry was a three time Pro Bowl running back for the St. Louis Cardinals, Toronto Argonauts and Washington Redskins.

== Early life ==
Metcalf grew up in Seattle - where his parents were from - with his mother, Christina Jefferson.

Metcalf was an outstanding athlete from a young age. After a year at a Catholic all-boys high school in Seattle, he transferred to Bishop Denis J. O'Connell High School in Arlington County, Virginia where he could play football. He lived with his father, who just finished his NFL career with the Redskins, and who helped coach the football team. At O'Connell Metcalf competed in both football and track and field. In 1983, he led the O'Connell Knights to the state championship, rushing for over 1000 yards, scoring 24 touchdowns on offense, defense and special teams and being named all-Met, the DC area player of the year and a Catholic All-American an made the Washington Metropolitan All-Scholastic team. He even filled in as QB for one game and upset De Matha. The next season he again gained all-Met honors and scored 11 touchdowns.

In track he set school records in the long jump, triple jump, and 100-meter dash(10.54 seconds) which still stand today. His records for the 200-meter (21.34 seconds) and 400-meter dash were broken in the spring of 2025. His 1983 long jump of 24 feet 5 1/2 inches was the 10th longest jump by a high school boy ever. He still has the seventh longest distance ever posted indoors by an American high schooler with a jump of 7.75 meters.

In 1991, he was inducted into the inaugural Bishop O'Connell Athletic Hall of Fame class and in 2023 he was inducted into the Arlington County Sports Hall of Fame.

== College career ==
Metcalf was heavily recruited and initially committed to the University of Miami and heavily considered the University of Notre Dame before attending the University of Texas at Austin where he was an All-Southwest Conference selection three times, the 1987 Southwest Conference player of the year and team MVP and a second-team All-American in 1987. Metcalf finished his four seasons with 4,051 yards from scrimmage, 125 receptions, and 31 total touchdowns, while adding another 1,650 yards on special teams, with an average of 10 yards per punt return. He set school records for most career receptions (125), most receptions in a season (42, twice), most receptions in a single game (12), most receiving yards in a game by a freshman (120), longest reception by a freshman (80 yards), career all-purpose yards (5,507), all-purpose yards in a season (1,921), and career return yards (1,076). And he currently holds the record for most career receptions by a running back (125), most career receiving yards by a running back (1,394), most receiving yards by a running back in one season (556), most receiving yards by a running back in one game (181), longest reception by a running back (80 yards, tied), most returns in a game (7). He is the only player in Texas history to lead the team in all-purpose yards all four years and one of only three players to have 100+ yards rushing and 100+ yards receiving in a single game. He helped the Longhorns to two Bluebonnet Bowl and led them to victory in the 1987 game.

In track, he was a four-time All-American and set the University of Texas at Austin's long jump record (still current) at 8.44 meters (27'8"1/4). He won the NCAA National Long Jump Championship in 1986 and 1988 (he skipped the 1987 meet) and the SWC Long Jump titles in 1986 and 1987. He was also the US Jr. National Long Jump Champion in 1986 and 1987. He earned the distinction of being a five-time All-American and in 1988 competed in the USA Olympic Trials, finishing 8th overall. He helped the team win two conference outdoor championships in 1986 and 1987 and to finish 2nd at the NCAA championships in 1987 and 1988.

After college he played in the 1989 Hula Bowl and the 1989 Senior Bowl.

In 2002 he was inducted into the Texas Longhorns Hall of Honor and in 2017 he was inducted into the Texas Sports Hall of Fame.

== Professional career ==
Pre-draft measurables
| Height | Weight | 40-yard dash | 10-yard split | 20-yard split | Vertical jump |
|---|---|---|---|---|---|
| 5 ft 9 in (1.75 m) | 180 lb (82 kg) | 4.46 s | 1.58 s | 2.59 s | 33.0 in (0.84 m) |
All values from NFL Combine

=== Cleveland Browns ===
Metcalf was selected by the Browns in the first round with the 13th overall pick in the 1989 NFL draft. The Browns traded four draft picks (first round, second round, fifth round, and ninth round) to the Denver Broncos (with which they chose Hall of Famer Steve Atwater among others) to move up seven spots to pick up Metcalf. Metcalf didn't sign with Cleveland until August, missing all but one preseason game.

A multi-talented player, Metcalf excelled at offense and as a returner on special teams. In his first season he had more than 2000 all-purpose yards and he set the Browns' rookie rushing record as the Brown's won the AFC Central and made it all the way to the 1989 AFC Championship game. In his second NFL season, he led the league in kickoff return yards (1,052), kickoff returns (52) and return touchdowns (two) including one for 101 yards - the longest in the NFL that season. He suffered an injury in 1991 that limited to only 8 games, but notable new coach Bill Belichick had him start returning punts. As a result of that decision he led the NFL in punt returns in 1992 including a TD. He would go on to lead the NFL in punt return touchdowns in four different seasons (1993–1995, 1997) and score at least one punt return touchdown per year for four years in a row and five out of six. In 1993 he led the league in all-purpose yards, was First Team All-Pro as both a kickoff returner and punt returner, made the Pro Bowl and was the AFC NFL Players Association Special Teams Player of the Year. He also had the longest punt return in the NFL that year - 91 yards. In 1994 he again made the Pro Bowl as a returner - though in the Pro Bowl he did line up as running back and had one catch - was the AFC NFL Players Association Special Teams Player of the Year and was a Sporting News All Pro. That season the Browns again made the playoffs, but lost in the second round.

=== Atlanta Falcons ===
In 1995 he was traded to the Atlanta Falcons along with the Browns 1st Round draft pick (#26 overall) for Atlanta's 1st round draft pick (#10 overall). Atlanta moved him to slot receiver in their "Run and Shoot" offense where he led the team with 104 receptions (7th in the NFL that year) for more than 1,000 yards and helped them make the playoffs as a wild card team. He also set a career high with 1,983 all-purpose yards. He was a reduced part of the offense in 1996, getting only half as many catches as yards, but still had a career 2nd best 1,937 all-purpose yards.

=== San Diego Chargers ===
At the end of the 1996 season, he became a free agent and signed with San Diego.

In San Diego he was again a receiver, and during his lone season there was again named an All-Pro and made the Pro Bowl primarily as a kick returner, though in that Pro Bowl he did have one rush and one reception. He led the league with a career high of 3 punt return touchdowns.

=== Arizona Cardinals ===
At the end of the season, the Chargers traded Metcalf, Patrick Sapp, the third and 33rd pick in the 1998 NFL draft and their 1999 first-round pick to move up one spot to draft Ryan Leaf, often considered one of the worst trades in franchise history.

In Arizona, his playing time was down and he didn't score a touchdown, but in the season finale, he returned a kickoff 46 yards to set up the game-winning field goal in a victory that sent Arizona to the playoffs.

=== Later career ===
After one season with the Cardinals, Metcalf was signed and released by the Baltimore Ravens during the summer and fall of 1999.

He was then signed by the Carolina Panthers, where he was unhappy and unproductive. The highlight of the season was that he became the first player in NFL history with 7,000 yards in offense and 7,000 yards in kick returns.

After sitting out the 2000 season, Metcalf was signed by the Oakland Raiders in the 2001 preseason and then released before the season started.

In October he was signed by the Washington Redskins, for whom his father had played. He had an 89-yard punt return for a touchdown, the longest in the NFL that season, that set the record for punt returns for a touchdown (since surpassed). Despite his late start, he finished in the top 10 for punt returns, punt return yards and 2nd for punt return touchdowns. He did not return to the Redskins in 2002.

He was signed by the Green Bay Packers for the last game of the 2002 season and the playoffs. He ran the ball twice and had 5 returns for 47 all-purpose yards. Following the season he retired.

=== NFL Career ===
Overall, Metcalf finished his career with 2,392 rushing yards, 541 receptions for 5,572 yards, 3,453 punt return yards (5th best in history), and 5,813 yards returning kickoffs. This gave him a total of 17,230 all-purpose yards, ranking him 9th among at the time of his retirement (he had been as high as 7th earlier in his career). He also scored 55 touchdowns (12 rushing, 31 receiving, ten punt returns, two kickoff returns). His 12 returns for touchdowns are the third most in NFL history behind Devin Hester and Brian Mitchell. Metcalf's 10 punt return touchdowns were an NFL record, until October 2, 2011, when Hester broke it against the Panthers. Metcalf is 2nd all-time for punt returns. At the time of his retirement, he was 4th in Punt Return Yards, 8th in Kickoff returns, and 9th in Kickoff return yards.

In 2008 he was named a Cleveland Brown legend. As of 2023, he has been a Pro Football Hall of Fame nominee eight times, but never made it to semi-finalist. He was nominated again in 2024 and 2025.

== NFL career statistics ==
Receiving statistics

| Year | Team | GP | Rec | Yards | Avg | Lng | TD | FD | Fumb | Lost |
|---|---|---|---|---|---|---|---|---|---|---|
| 1989 | CLE | 16 | 54 | 397 | 7.4 | 68 | 4 | 0 | 0 | 0 |
| 1990 | CLE | 16 | 57 | 452 | 7.9 | 35 | 1 | 0 | 0 | 0 |
| 1991 | CLE | 8 | 29 | 294 | 10.1 | 45 | 0 | 13 | 0 | 0 |
| 1992 | CLE | 16 | 47 | 614 | 13.1 | 69 | 5 | 25 | 2 | 1 |
| 1993 | CLE | 16 | 63 | 539 | 8.6 | 49 | 2 | 21 | 1 | 1 |
| 1994 | CLE | 16 | 47 | 436 | 9.3 | 57 | 3 | 21 | 2 | 2 |
| 1995 | ATL | 16 | 104 | 1,189 | 11.4 | 62 | 8 | 53 | 0 | 0 |
| 1996 | ATL | 16 | 54 | 599 | 11.1 | 67 | 6 | 33 | 0 | 0 |
| 1997 | SD | 16 | 40 | 576 | 14.4 | 62 | 2 | 24 | 1 | 1 |
| 1998 | ARI | 16 | 31 | 324 | 10.5 | 29 | 0 | 18 | 0 | 0 |
| 1999 | CAR | 16 | 11 | 133 | 12.1 | 33 | 0 | 6 | 0 | 0 |
| 2001 | WAS | 10 | 4 | 19 | 4.8 | 9 | 0 | 0 | 0 | 0 |
| Career | | 178 | 541 | 5,572 | 10.3 | 69 | 31 | 214 | 6 | 5 |

Rushing statistics

| Year | Team | GP | Att | Yards | Avg | Lng | TD | FD | Fum | Lost |
|---|---|---|---|---|---|---|---|---|---|---|
| 1989 | CLE | 16 | 187 | 633 | 3.4 | 43 | 6 | 0 | 0 | 0 |
| 1990 | CLE | 16 | 80 | 248 | 3.1 | 17 | 1 | 0 | 0 | 0 |
| 1991 | CLE | 8 | 30 | 107 | 3.6 | 15 | 0 | 3 | 0 | 0 |
| 1992 | CLE | 16 | 73 | 301 | 4.1 | 31 | 1 | 12 | 1 | 1 |
| 1993 | CLE | 16 | 129 | 611 | 4.7 | 55 | 1 | 25 | 2 | 2 |
| 1994 | CLE | 16 | 93 | 329 | 3.5 | 37 | 2 | 12 | 1 | 0 |
| 1995 | ATL | 16 | 28 | 133 | 4.8 | 23 | 1 | 8 | 0 | 0 |
| 1996 | ATL | 16 | 3 | 8 | 2.7 | 4 | 0 | 0 | 0 | 0 |
| 1997 | SD | 16 | 3 | -5 | -1.7 | 2 | 0 | 0 | 0 | 0 |
| 1999 | CAR | 16 | 2 | 20 | 10.0 | 17 | 0 | 1 | 0 | 0 |
| 2002 | GB | 1 | 2 | 7 | 3.5 | 5 | 0 | 1 | 0 | 0 |
| Career | | 179 | 630 | 2,392 | 3.8 | 55 | 12 | 62 | 4 | 3 |

Returning statistics

| Year | Team | GP | PR | Yards | TD | FC | Lng | KR | Yards | TD | FC | Lng |
|---|---|---|---|---|---|---|---|---|---|---|---|---|
| 1989 | CLE | 16 | 0 | 0 | 0 | 0 | 0 | 31 | 718 | 0 | 0 | 49 |
| 1990 | CLE | 16 | 0 | 0 | 0 | 0 | 0 | 52 | 1,052 | 2 | 0 | 101 |
| 1991 | CLE | 8 | 12 | 100 | 0 | 1 | 30 | 23 | 351 | 0 | 0 | 24 |
| 1992 | CLE | 16 | 44 | 429 | 1 | 10 | 75 | 9 | 157 | 0 | 0 | 30 |
| 1993 | CLE | 16 | 36 | 464 | 2 | 11 | 91 | 15 | 318 | 0 | 0 | 47 |
| 1994 | CLE | 16 | 35 | 348 | 2 | 6 | 92 | 9 | 210 | 0 | 0 | 32 |
| 1995 | ATL | 16 | 39 | 383 | 1 | 14 | 66 | 12 | 278 | 0 | 0 | 47 |
| 1996 | ATL | 16 | 27 | 296 | 0 | 9 | 39 | 49 | 1,034 | 0 | 0 | 55 |
| 1997 | SD | 16 | 45 | 489 | 3 | 8 | 85 | 16 | 355 | 0 | 0 | 63 |
| 1998 | ARI | 16 | 43 | 295 | 0 | 7 | 24 | 57 | 1,218 | 0 | 0 | 59 |
| 1999 | CAR | 16 | 34 | 238 | 0 | 18 | 30 | 4 | 56 | 0 | 0 | 31 |
| 2001 | WAS | 10 | 33 | 412 | 1 | 5 | 89 | 1 | 25 | 0 | 0 | 25 |
| 2002 | GB | 1 | 3 | -1 | 0 | 0 | 0 | 2 | 41 | 0 | 0 | 21 |
| Career | | 179 | 351 | 3,453 | 10 | 89 | 92 | 280 | 5,813 | 2 | 0 | 101 |

== Personal life ==
Following his retirement as a player, Metcalf went into coaching. He coached football and track at Rainier Beach High School in Seattle, Washington and in the 2005–2006 season he helped lead the team to the state semi-finals in football. He also started an elite high school track and field club called Seatown Express. In 2013 he became a volunteer track and field coach at the University of Washington working with horizontal jumpers and sprints, and in 2016 he transitioned into an Assistant Coach for sprints there. In his first year as an assistant coach, the women's 4x400-meter relay squad he coached qualified for the NCAA Championships for the first time in school history and he has since coached the sprinters to break several school records.
