= Devin Hester =

American football player (born 1982)

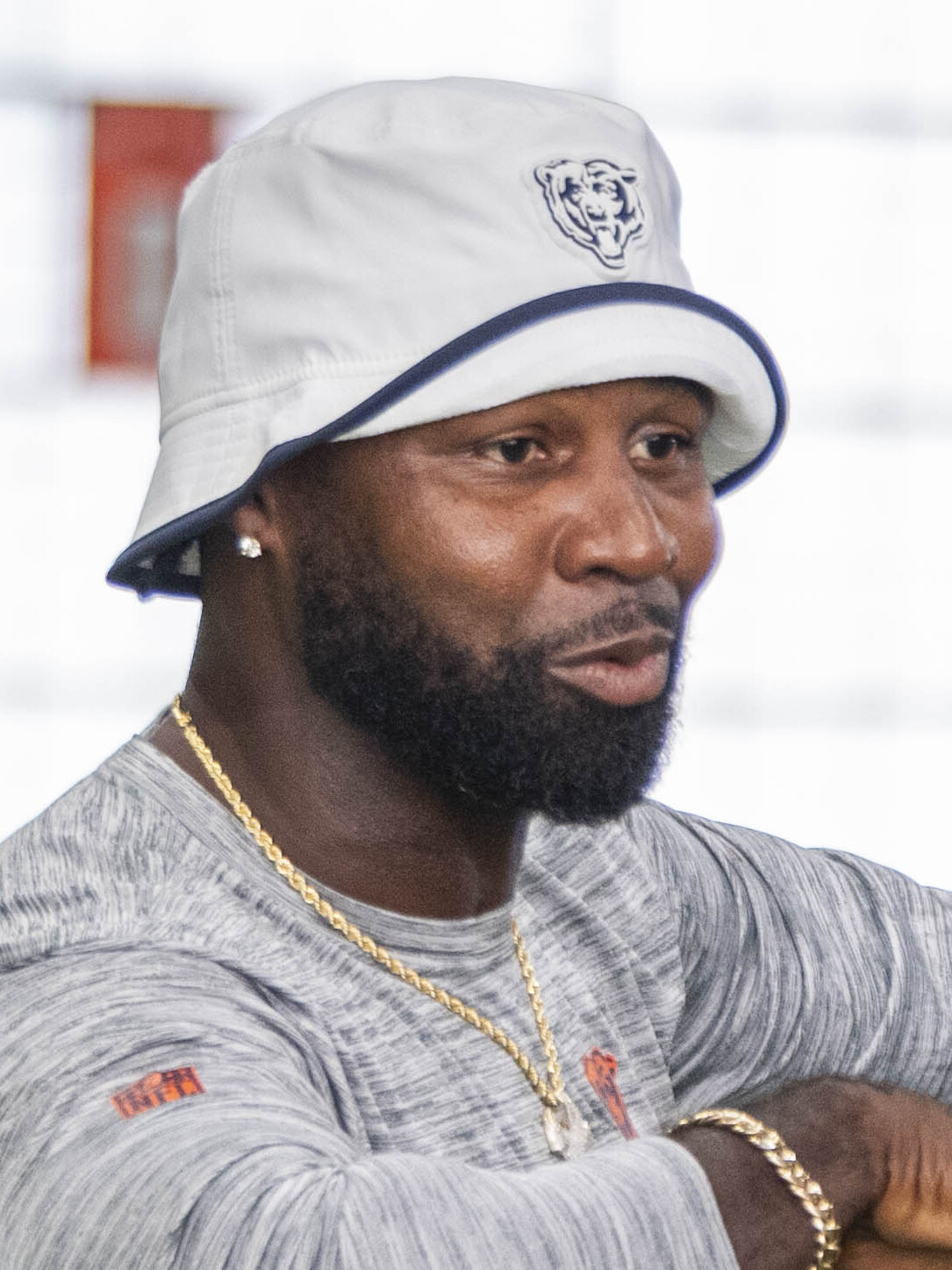
- Hester in 2025

No. 23, 17, 14
- Positions: Wide receiver, return specialist

Personal information
- Born: November 4, 1982 (age 44); Riviera Beach, Florida, U.S.
- Listed height: 5 ft 11 in (1.80 m)
- Listed weight: 190 lb (86 kg)

Career information
- High school: Suncoast (Riviera Beach)
- College: Miami (FL) (2003–2005)
- NFL draft: 2006: 2nd round, 57th overall pick

Career history
- Chicago Bears (2006–2013); Atlanta Falcons (2014–2015); Baltimore Ravens (2016); Seattle Seahawks (2016)

Awards and highlights
- 3× First-team All-Pro (2006, 2007, 2010); Second-team All-Pro (2011); 4× Pro Bowl (2006, 2007, 2010, 2014); 2× NFL kickoff return yards leader (2013, 2014); 2× NFL punt return yards leader (2006, 2010); 3× NFL Alumni Special Teams Player of the Year (2006, 2007, 2010); NFL 2000s All-Decade Team; NFL 2010s All-Decade Team; NFL 100th Anniversary All-Time Team; PFWA All-Rookie Team (2006); 100 Greatest Bears of All-Time; First-team All-American (2004); 2× First-team All-ACC (2004, 2005); NFL records: Most career return touchdowns: 20; Most career punt return touchdowns: 14; Most return touchdowns in a season: 6 (2007; tied)

Career NFL statistics
- Receptions: 255
- Receiving yards: 3,311
- Receiving touchdowns: 16
- Kickoff return yards: 7,333
- Punt return yards: 3,696
- Kickoff return touchdowns: 6
- Punt return touchdowns: 14
- Stats at Pro Football Reference
- Pro Football Hall of Fame

Devin Devorris Hester Sr. (born November 4, 1982) is an American former professional football player who was a wide receiver and return specialist in the National Football League (NFL). As the only primary return specialist to be enshrined in the Pro Football Hall of Fame, Hester is widely considered to be the greatest return specialist in NFL history.

He played college football for the Miami Hurricanes, where he was the first player in the university's recent history to play in all three phases of American football: offense, defense and special teams. He was selected by the Chicago Bears in the second round of the 2006 NFL draft. Hester also played for the Atlanta Falcons, the Baltimore Ravens and the Seattle Seahawks over his 11-season NFL career. He is also the only player to return the opening kick of a Super Bowl for a touchdown. Hester was selected to the NFL All-Decade Team for both the 2000s and 2010s.

Originally drafted as a cornerback, Hester quickly made an impact as a kick and punt returner, and later became a wide receiver. He holds the NFL record for most all-time return touchdowns—punt and kickoff combined—and most all-time punt return touchdowns. He was inducted into the Pro Football Hall of Fame in 2024 after being a finalist in 2022 and 2023.

== Early life ==
Devin Hester was born to Juanita Brown and Lenorris Hester Sr. in Riviera Beach, Florida. His parents separated when he was a toddler. Before he became a teenager, his mother was severely injured in a car accident, while his father died of complications from AIDS two years later. His step-father, Derrick Brown, and brother, Lenorris Jr., helped Hester escape his depression and rebuild his life by introducing him to football. He soon returned to his normal life and began to excel in sports.

During his youth, Hester enjoyed following the Dallas Cowboys. He especially idolized Deion Sanders, Emmitt Smith, and Michael Irvin. He was also a fan of the Chicago Bulls during the Michael Jordan and Phil Jackson era. Fred Taylor of the University of Florida was Hester's favorite athlete. In addition to football, he also enjoyed playing soccer and following baseball.

== High school ==
Hester attended first Palm Beach Gardens High, then on to Suncoast High School, where he played football as a cornerback, wide receiver, return specialist, and running back. He earned recognition from SuperPrep.com as the top high school prospect in Florida and Parade, who named Hester onto their All-American team. Hester also participated in the 2002 CaliFlorida Bowl, where he returned a kick for an 80-yard touchdown. His success prompted his teammates to nickname him "Sugar Foot".

Considered a five-star recruit by Rivals.com, Hester was listed as the second best cornerback in the nation in 2002.

=== Track and field ===
Hester was also a standout track athlete. While at Suncoast, he received All-America accolades, and he ranked second nationally in the long jump as a junior. He also captured the 2004 Big EAST Indoor long jump title as a member of the University of Miami track and field team, with a leap of 7.37 meters. He also competed in the 60 meters and 100 meters, posting personal bests of 6.77 seconds and 10.62, 10.42W seconds, respectively.

Personal bests

| Event | Time (seconds) | Venue | Date |
|---|---|---|---|
| 60 meters | 6.77 | Syracuse, New York | February 21, 2004 |
| 100 meters | 10.42 (+6.0 m/s) w | Piscataway, New Jersey | May 1, 2004 |
| 200 meters | 22.23 | New York, New York | March 9, 2002 |
| Event | Mark (meters) | Venue | Date |
| Long Jump | 7.37 m (24 ft 2 in) | Syracuse, New York | February 21, 2004 |

== College career ==
After completing high school, Hester enrolled at the University of Miami, where he played for the Miami Hurricanes football team from 2003 to 2005. As a sophomore in 2004, he earned national recognition as a kick returner after being named a first-team All-American by the Walter Camp Football Foundation and The Sporting News. His ability to thrust laterally and break away from pursuers made him one of the nation's most dangerous return specialists. During his freshman year, Hester returned an opening kick for a 98-yard touchdown against the Florida Gators. In a game against Duke in 2005, Hester broke six tackles while returning an 81-yard punt. Ultimately, Hester completed his college career with a total of six touchdowns from kick returns (4 punts, 2 kickoffs), one blocked field goal return, one rushing touchdown, one receiving touchdown and recorded five interceptions as a defensive back.

Hester became the first football player in the Miami Hurricanes' recent history to play as member of the special, offensive, and defensive teams. He was known as "Hurricane Hester" by his fans and teammates. In his junior season, Hester returned 19 punts for 326 yards and three touchdowns, along with 15 kickoffs for 389 yards and a score, while also intercepting four passes. During his productive tenure at the University of Miami, Hester befriended Deion Sanders through Ed Reed, an alumnus of the University of Miami, and friend of Sanders. Sanders counseled, advised, and encouraged Hester. Hester was also known as "Anytime" in college, which is a tribute to Sanders' nickname, "Prime Time". He also adopted Sanders' signature touchdown dance, and showboating maneuvers, which he carried to his future NFL career.

Hester finished his three seasons with the Miami Hurricanes with 41 punt returns for 638 yards and 4 touchdowns, 40 kick returns for 1,019 yards and 2 touchdowns, 24 carries for 160 yards rushing and 1 touchdown, 10 receptions for 196 yards receiving, 11 tackles, 1 sack, 1 fumble recovery (returned for touchdown), and five interceptions for 57 return yards.

== Professional career ==
Pre-draft measurables
| Height | Weight | Arm length | Hand span | 40-yard dash | 10-yard split | 20-yard split | 20-yard shuttle | Three-cone drill | Vertical jump | Broad jump | Bench press |
|---|---|---|---|---|---|---|---|---|---|---|---|
| 5 ft 10 5/8 in (1.79 m) | 190 lb (86 kg) | 31 1/8 in (0.79 m) | 9 in (0.23 m) | 4.43 s | 1.53 s | 2.61 s | 4.20* s | 6.78* s | 38 in (0.97 m) | 10 ft 4 in (3.15 m) | 16 reps |
All values from NFL Combine/*Pro Day

=== Chicago Bears ===
==== 2006 season ====
Hester began his professional career in the National Football League with the Chicago Bears, who selected him in the second round of the 2006 NFL draft with the 57th overall pick. The team originally drafted Hester as a cornerback, but they intended to play him as a return specialist, following the retirement of Jerry Azumah and departure of Bobby Wade. The team's decision to draft Hester was initially criticized by fans and sports analysts, who believed the Bears should have spent their early picks on offensive prospects.

In his first 13 weeks as a professional football player, Hester recorded six return touchdowns, including a punt return in his NFL debut, and a then-record tying 108-yard touchdown from a missed field goal against the New York Giants. He also returned a punt for a clutch 83-yard game-winning touchdown against the Arizona Cardinals to give the Bears the lead in a comeback win, and two kickoff returns in one game against the St. Louis Rams. Following his record-breaking game during week 14, opposing teams exercised additional caution when allowing Hester to return kicks. During the postseason, Hester ran back a punt at a critical moment against the Seattle Seahawks, but it was called back on a blocking penalty. Regardless, the Bears won both NFC playoffs rounds, and advanced to Super Bowl XLI to play the Indianapolis Colts. He started the game for the Bears by returning the game's opening kick for a touchdown. The feat was the first touchdown return of an opening kickoff in Super Bowl history and still remains as the only one in Super Bowl history. It also marked the quickest touchdown scored in Super Bowl history as well as the quickest lead ever taken by any team, though the latter record has since been surpassed by the Seahawks in Super Bowl XLVIII. Following the kick, the Colts did not kick the ball directly to Hester, significantly limiting the Bears' return efforts as they would lose 17–29.

Hester's feats in 2006 earned him three NFC Special Teams Player of the Week Awards and a trip to the 2007 Pro Bowl. After the 2006 season ended, he was named the NFC Player of the Month for December and was a finalist for 2006 Pepsi NFL Rookie of the Year. He was also voted onto the Associated Press's 2006 All-Pro team with 48 and a half votes, finishing fourth behind LaDainian Tomlinson, Champ Bailey, and Jason Taylor who all received 50 votes. He finished the 2006 season by accumulating three touchdowns for 600 yards on 47 punt returns, and two touchdowns for 528 yards on 20 kick returns, thus making him one of the league's most productive kick and punt returners. Even without taking an offensive snap prior to week 14, Hester was the Bears' second leading scorer, behind kicker Robbie Gould. On the other hand, Hester struggled to control the football at times, having games with multiple fumbles on at least two separate occasions.

Many fans speculated that Hester's speed and prior experience as a wide receiver would earn him a spot on the Bears' offense, similar to teammate Rashied Davis. While head coach Lovie Smith dismissed the speculation, he played Hester as a wide receiver for one play against the Tampa Bay Buccaneers on December 17, 2006; he ran a curl route and was targeted by quarterback Rex Grossman, but the pass was too low and fell incomplete. Hester attributes his talent to his mentor, Deion Sanders, who Hester claims helped him perfect his return game. Sanders, a former cornerback and kick returner, compliments Hester after every productive performance. However, Sanders also berated Hester for taunting another player en route to his second touchdown return against the St. Louis Rams. His teammates and coaches have also praised Hester. After the 2006 season, he was voted to receive the team's Brian Piccolo Award, which is given to a player who possesses a good character and work ethic. Bears fans and the local media nicknamed Hester the "Windy City Flyer" during his first year in Chicago.

==== 2007 season ====
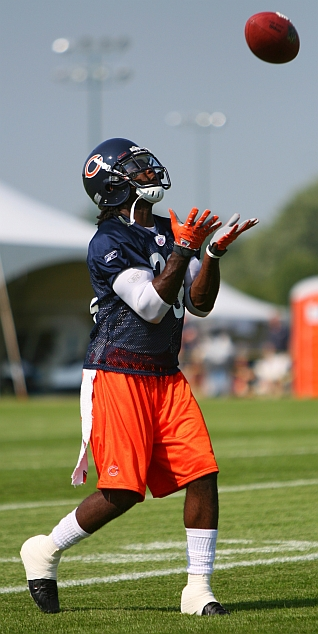
Hester in training camp with the Chicago Bears in 2007

Shortly after losing Super Bowl XLI, Hester and special teams coach Dave Toub spent a significant amount of time working on new return strategies and formations. Ultimately, Smith converted Hester into a wide receiver in order to increase the number of opportunities he would receive during a game. Hester, who originally played as a wide receiver at the University of Miami, was initially hesitant about making the switch to offense, as he wished to follow in the footsteps of Deion Sanders. However, the Bears' coaching staff eventually persuaded Hester to make the transition over the summer. During the 2007 offseason, Hester won the Best Breakthrough Athlete ESPY Award.

Although NFL rules generally required wide receivers to wear jersey numbers in the 10–19 and 80–89 range, players who later change positions are allowed to keep their previous number, as long as it is not within the 50–79 range for eligible receiver purposes prior to the 2021 NFL season. Hester was allowed to keep number 23, a number normally used for cornerbacks, since it sits outside the 50–79 range. Along with former Pittsburgh Steelers wide receiver Dwight Stone, who wore number 20 during his eight-year stint in Pittsburgh, and Oakland Raiders wide receiver Cliff Branch, Hester was one of three wide receivers to wear a 20s jersey number since the NFL adopted the current uniform numbering system in 1973.

Hester returned his first touchdown of the season, a 73-yard punt return, against the Kansas City Chiefs during week 2. He nearly recorded a second touchdown return, but the play was negated by a holding penalty. Hester established himself as a threat on offense, when he caught an 81-yard touchdown pass from Brian Griese against the Minnesota Vikings. He also returned a punt for an 89-yard touchdown, though the Bears lost the game. In the weeks to come, many opposing special teams began to kick the ball away from Hester, contributing to, according to Mike Pereira, a 132% increase in kickoffs that went out of bounds. Rod Marinelli, the head coach of the Detroit Lions, placed a strong emphasis on kicking the ball away from Hester, saying, "kick the ball into Lake Michigan and make sure it (sinks) to the bottom."

Before the Bears' week 12 matchup against the Denver Broncos, Todd Sauerbrun infamously stated that he would kick the ball to Hester. Hester, who had not returned a kick for a touchdown in almost a month, responded by returning a punt and kickoff for touchdowns. Keith Olbermann, a commentator for NBC Sunday Night Football, awarded Sauerbrun with the dubious "Worst Person in the NFL Award" for kicking the ball to Hester and failing to tackle him. The two touchdowns gave Hester the most kick returns for touchdowns in the Bears' franchise history. Hester concluded the season with a 64-yard punt return for a touchdown and a 55-yard touchdown reception against the New Orleans Saints. He was even given the opportunity to throw a pass on a variation of a wide receiver reverse, but he was sacked while motioning to Bernard Berrian.

Hester finished the season with six kicks returned for touchdowns, which set a league record. He finished the season ranking fourth on the League's all-time combined kick return list, behind Brian Mitchell (13), Eric Metcalf (12), and Dante Hall (12). Additionally, he amassed 299 yards on 20 receptions as a receiver, though he was often used as a decoy. His play on offense received mixed commentary. While the Bears' coaching staff believed Hester showed enough progress to become one of the team's top receivers in 2008, Hester was prone to making small errors, including running routes incorrectly or dropping catches. He drew a 15-yard facemask penalty while attempting to fend off a would-be tackler in a game against the Saints, and received a $5,000 fine. Nevertheless, Hester concluded the season with four Player of the Week Awards, giving him a franchise-high total of seven in his career, and an invitation to the 2008 Pro Bowl.

==== 2008 season ====
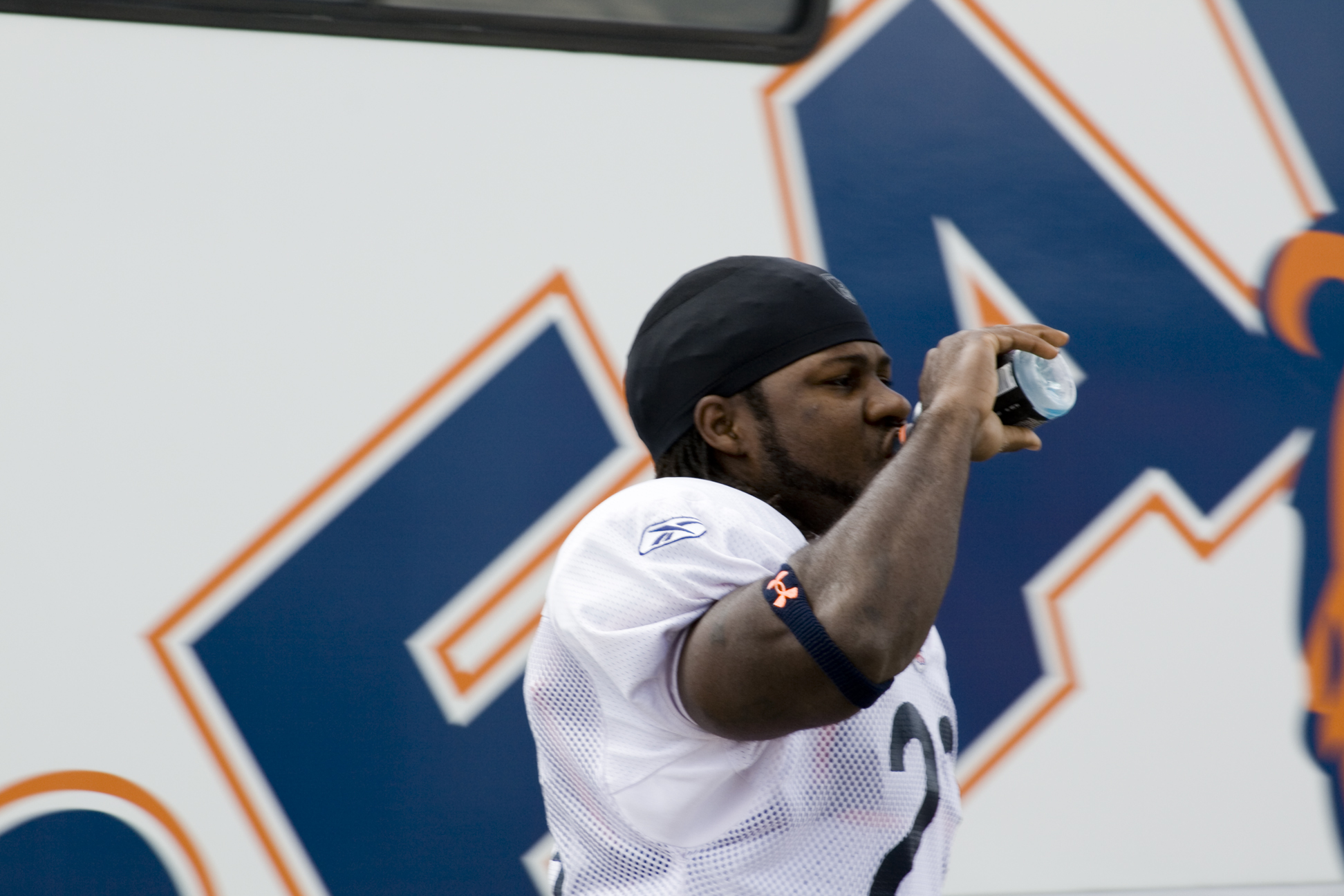
Hester at training camp in 2008

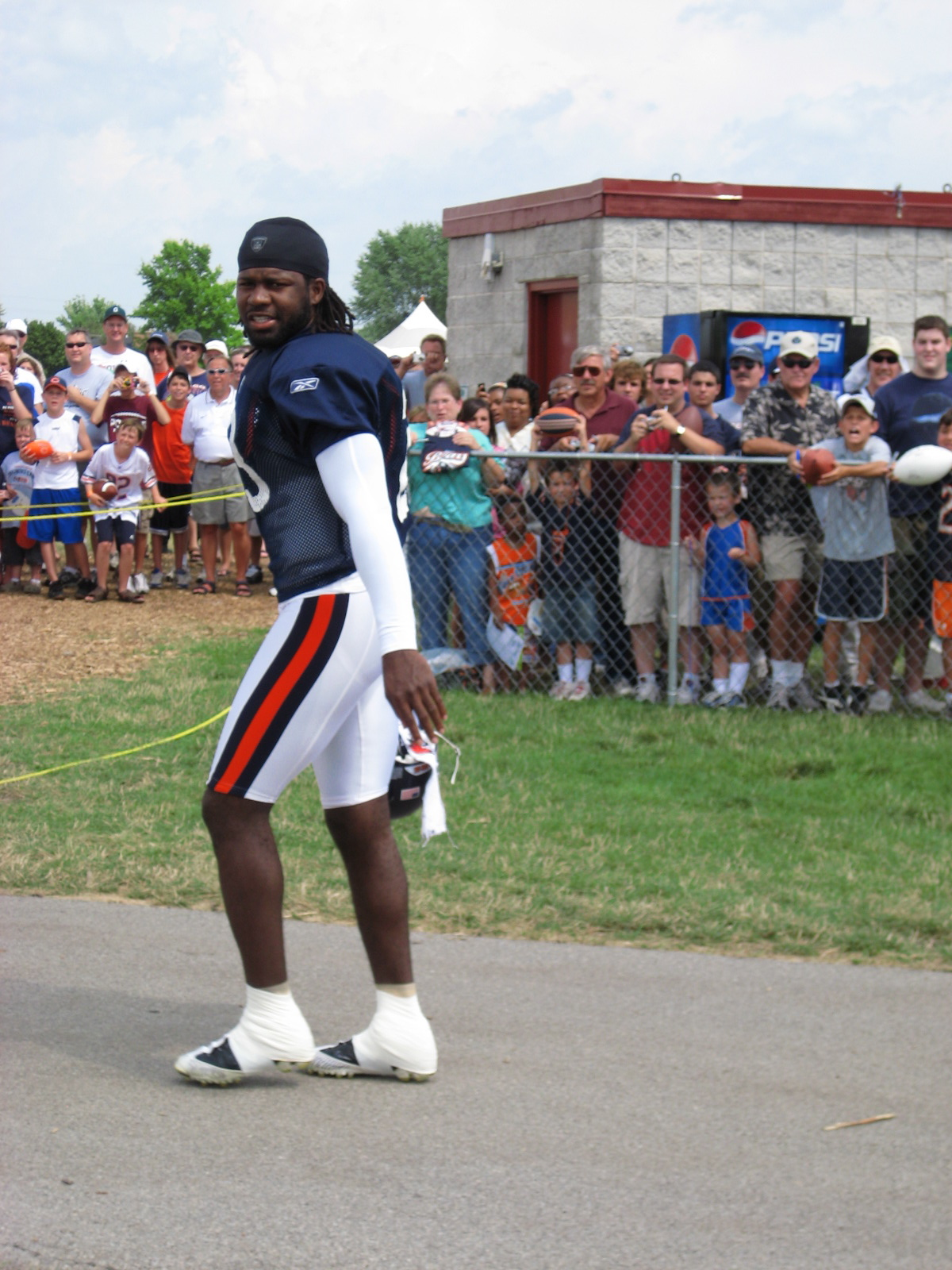
Hester in training camp with the Chicago Bears in 2008

Prior to the beginning of the 2008 season, Hester stated that he would not attend the Bears' summer camp unless the team offered him a new contract. He further voiced his displeasure with his current contract in a phone interview with the Chicago Tribune, commenting, "I can't go out and play this year making $445,000. Come on, man." After receiving a $30,000 fine for not attending two days of training, Hester returned to the team's camp. The team later offered him a new four-year contract extension, worth over $40 million.

The Bears continued to utilize Hester in the receiving game in the 2008 season. Hester missed the third game of the season after tearing cartilage in his ribs during the previous week. He returned to the field in the team's week 4 contest against the Philadelphia Eagles, where he caught his first touchdown of the season. Smith gave Hester his first starting job as a wide receiver the next week, in place of the injured Brandon Lloyd. Hester went on to catch five passes for 66 yards and one touchdown. In the following week, Hester totaled 87 yards on six receptions against the Atlanta Falcons in a 22–20 loss.

After a week 8 bye, Hester caught four passes for 42 yards and had an 11-yard run against the Detroit Lions. He eventually lost his kick return duties to Danieal Manning, but began receiving more playing time as a wide receiver. Between week 12 and 15, Hester caught 17 passes for 250 yards and one touchdown. David Haugh of the Chicago Tribune regarded Hester as the team's "biggest threat in the passing game". He concluded the season by catching 51 passes for a team high 665 yards. Unlike his previous two seasons in the NFL, Hester did not record a single touchdown return and only averaged 6.2 yards per punt return. Smith commented on Hester at the end of the season by saying, "I know his returns dropped off a little bit this year, but his plate was full there for a while. We think we have a happy medium now for him as a punt returner and continuing to develop as a receiver." Hester was also selected to play in the 2009 Pro Bowl as a third alternate.

==== 2009 season ====
After the acquisition of Jay Cutler, Hester took on the role as the de facto number one wide receiver. In the first game of the season, Hester caught seven passes from Cutler for 90 yards, including a 36-yard touchdown reception. In the following weeks Hester began to develop a rapport with Cutler and amassed 634 receiving yards and three touchdowns through the first ten weeks of the season. He played the best game of the season on October 25, 2009, against the Cincinnati Bengals, catching eight passes for 101 yards and a touchdown. In a game against the St. Louis Rams during the thirteenth week of the season, Hester injured his calf and missed three starts. Hester returned to play in the Bears season finale against the Detroit Lions, catching three passes for 75 yards. Despite missing the three starts, Hester led the team with 757 receiving yards, and finished behind Greg Olsen in receptions. Hester built his reputation around his kick returning abilities, but his kickoff-returning duties decreased significantly following the 2007 season finale. He told the Chicago Tribune that he planned on spending the offseason honing his receiving and returning skills by strengthening in his legs, especially to fully recover from the calf injury he sustained earlier.

==== 2010 season ====
During the offseason, Hester worked on his speed and conditioning by prioritizing running over weight training. Bears offensive coordinator Mike Martz gave Hester the opportunity to work with Isaac Bruce, who was part of Martz's "Greatest Show on Turf". Bruce advised Hester on route-running and basic wide receiver fundamentals. Hester appeared in three preseason games, where he recorded five receptions for 64 yards. On September 19, the regular season, Hester caught four passes for 77 yards and a one-handed catch for a touchdown against the Dallas Cowboys. The following week, Hester returned a punt for a 62-yard touchdown in a close game against the Green Bay Packers. This was his first touchdown return since the final week of the 2007 season against the New Orleans Saints. On October 17, Hester returned two punts for 93 yards and an 89-yard touchdown, in a 23–20 loss against the Seattle Seahawks. The touchdown tied the record for most combined kick and punt return touchdowns in a career with Brian Mitchell (13). In week 10 of the regular season, Hester caught four passes for 38 yards and a 19-yard touchdown against the Minnesota Vikings. Hester was given back his kick return duties, and returned two kicks for 100 yards including a run back of 68 yards. Hester also ran back two punts for 47 yards including a return of 42 yards. Two weeks later, Hester caught three balls for 86 yards from Jay Cutler, and returned a kick 46 yards in a 31–26 win against the Philadelphia Eagles. On December 20 in a game against the Minnesota Vikings, Hester scored on a 15-yard touchdown pass from Jay Cutler. Later, Hester returned a Chris Kluwe punt 64 yards for a touchdown, which set the all-time NFL record for combined kickoff and punt returns for touchdown with 14, passing Brian Mitchell. It was the tenth punt return for touchdown of his career, tying Eric Metcalf's record for the most punt return touchdowns in a career.

Hester finished the season with 40 receptions for 475 yards and four touchdowns. As a return specialist, he amassed 564 yards on punt returns, while averaging 17.1 yards per return and scored three touchdowns. Hester was the third leading scorer, behind running back Matt Forte and kicker Robbie Gould. His accomplishments in the 2010 season earned him two NFC Special Teams Player of The Week Awards, a trip to the 2011 Pro Bowl, and a selection to the All-Pro Team. Hester was ranked 32nd best player in the League in a poll where active NFL players ranked their top 100 peers.

==== 2011 season ====
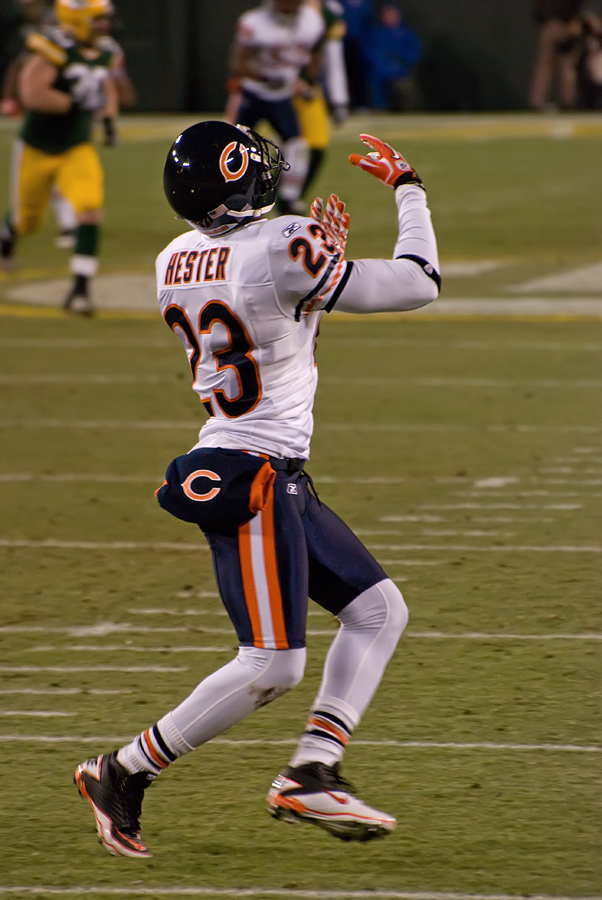
Hester receiving a punt in 2011

Prior to the 2011 season, the NFL passed a new rule that moved kickoffs to the 35-yard line from the 30-yard line. The change was a result of a player safety initiative to reduce injuries during kickoffs. The rule change directly resulted in a higher number of touchbacks and fewer returns. Hester commented on the situation stating, "They got a couple touchbacks but you've still got guys bringing it out and at the end of the day that rule is pointless."

On October 2, 2011, Hester became the NFL's all-time leader in punt return touchdowns with 11 when he returned a punt 69 yards for a touchdown against the Carolina Panthers surpassing Eric Metcalf's record. On October 16, Hester returned a kickoff for a 98-yard touchdown against the Minnesota Vikings. On November 13, Hester returned a punt 82 yards for a touchdown against the Detroit Lions. He had 26 receptions for 369 yards and a touchdown in the 2011 season. He earned NFC Special Teams Player of the Week three times in the 2011 season for Weeks 4,6, and 10. He was named NFC Special Teams Player of the Month for October. He was ranked 48th by his fellow players on the NFL Top 100 Players of 2012.

==== 2012 season ====
On April 30, 2012, Bears offensive coordinator Mike Tice and general manager Phil Emery announced that Hester's role would be reduced down to at least 4th-string, and Tice mentioned that the Bears would utilize Hester in a series of plays called the "Hester Package", instead of an every-down receiver. In the season, Hester caught 23 passes while only catching one touchdown, which occurred in week 4 against the Dallas Cowboys. He also failed to return a kick/punt for a touchdown and ranked 22nd in punt return average during 2012. After Smith's firing on December 31, Hester stated that he considered retirement, though he tweeted that his consideration was not related to Smith.

==== 2013 season ====
Hester exclusively saw playing time as a return specialist when Marc Trestman became the Bears' head coach. In week two against the Minnesota Vikings, Hester broke the team record for most kickoff return yards in a game with 249. He was named NFC Special Teams Player of the Week. Four weeks later against the New York Giants, Hester passed Glyn Milburn for the most all-time kickoff return yards in franchise history with 4,643 yards. Against the Washington Redskins, Hester returned a punt 81 yards for a touchdown for his 19th career return touchdown, tying Deion Sanders' record. In addition to Hester's NFL records, he is also the leader in career punt returns (264) and punt return yards (3,241) among active players. Hester ended the 2013 season having averaged 27.7 kick return yards and 14.2 punt return yards, while also leading the league in kick return yards with 1,442.

Hester became a free agent on March 11, 2014. He released a statement on March 5, 2014, that the Bears did not intend to re-sign him. Hester thanked the Bears organization and fan base for their support throughout his time in Chicago. Phil Emery, the Bears' general manager, commented on Hester's legacy, stating, "While Devin has redefined the pinnacle standard of the return position in the NFL, the memories and contributions he has given us cannot be measured by stats or numbers."

=== Atlanta Falcons ===
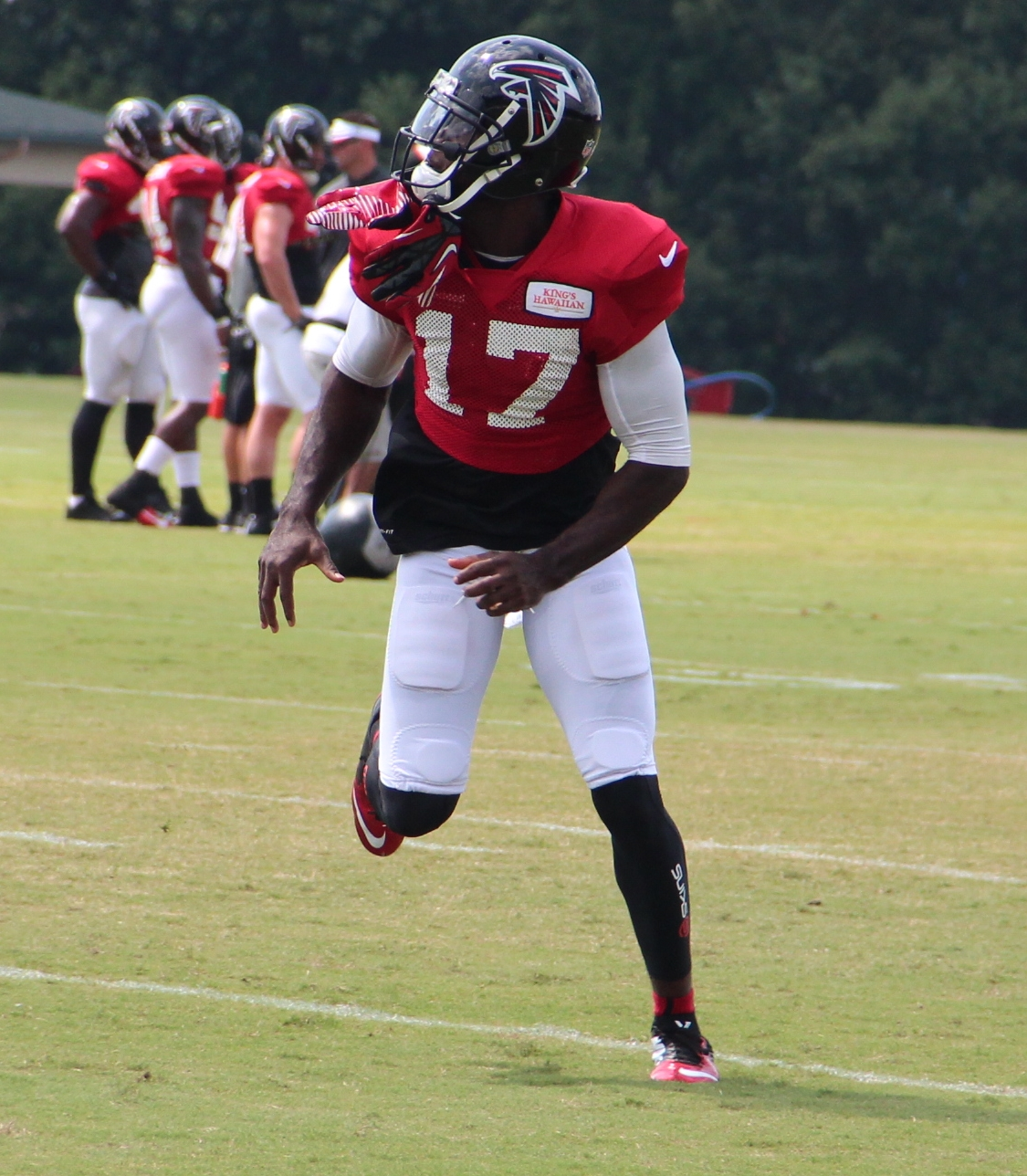
Hester with the Atlanta Falcons in 2014

Hester signed a three-year contract with the Atlanta Falcons on March 20, 2014. In his debut game with the Falcons, Hester caught five passes for 99 yards, helping lead the Falcons to a 37–34 week 1 overtime victory over the New Orleans Saints. During week 3 against the Tampa Bay Buccaneers, Hester brought back a 62-yard punt for his 20th career touchdown return, breaking the record for career non-offensive touchdowns he previously shared with Deion Sanders. Also in the same game, Hester recorded a rushing touchdown, forced fumble and fumble recovery. Hester was named the NFC's Special Teams Player of the Week for his accomplishments. Hester concluded the season with 504 receiving yards from 38 receptions and led the NFL with 1,128 kick-off return yards. He was also selected to play in the 2015 Pro Bowl.

Hester missed a majority of the 2015 NFL season due to a turf toe injury. The Falcons activated him from the injury reserve for the final five games of the season, but only used Hester on special teams. He tallied 235 kick return yards and 34 punt return yards, but failed to record a touchdown. Hester underwent foot surgery in January 2016 to repair the toe injury he sustained earlier in the season.

On July 26, Hester was released by the Falcons. Hester attributed his dismissal to the lingering toe-injury he sustained in the previous season. He voiced interest in continuing his career in the NFL for the 2016 season once he has fully recovered.

=== Baltimore Ravens ===
On September 4, 2016, Hester agreed to a one-year deal with the Baltimore Ravens. Hester appeared in 12 games for the Ravens, where he was used exclusively as a return specialist. He recorded 180 punt return yards and 466 kick return yards but failed to return a touchdown during the 2016 season. The Ravens released Hester on December 13.

=== Seattle Seahawks ===
Hester signed with the Seattle Seahawks on January 3, 2017. He debuted for the Seahawks in the first round of the 2016 playoffs against the Detroit Lions. Hester returned one kickoff for 20 yards and one punt for five yards against the Detroit Lions. During the Divisional Round, he returned five kickoffs for 194 yards, including 78- and 50-yard run backs against the Atlanta Falcons. The Falcons defeated the Seahawks, 36–20. Hester announced his intentions to retire from professional football after the game.

=== Retirement and legacy ===
On December 12, 2017, Hester officially announced his retirement from the NFL. The Chicago Bears honored both Hester and former teammate Matt Forte on April 23, 2018, during a press conference at Halas Hall. The two players signed ceremonial one-day contracts to retire as members of the Bears.

He amassed over 10,000 career yards returning punts and kickoffs, an NFL-record 20 touchdown returns, and four Pro Bowl selections over his 11-season career. He is regarded as one of the greatest return specialists in NFL history. Dave Toub, Hester's former special teams coordinator, noted Hester left a lasting impression in the NFL, shaping the way teams approached special teams and the value they placed on return specialists. He believed Hester's success led other teams to invest draft capital in return specialists, hoping to replicate the impact Hester had on the Bears. He also added other teams shifted their approach by prioritizing players who excelled in covering kicks and punts rather than retaining backups who made limited contributions to special teams.

On September 22, 2021, Hester was nominated for the Pro Football Hall of Fame in his first year of eligibility, though he was not inducted. On February 8, 2024, in his third year of eligibility, Hester was selected for induction, becoming the first return specialist to make the Hall of Fame.

== NFL career statistics ==
Legend
| | NFL record |
| | Led the league |
| **Bold** | Career high |

=== Regular season ===
| Year | Team | Games | | Receiving | | | | | Rushing | | | | | Kick returns | | | | | Punt returns | | | | | Fumbles | |
| Year | Team | GP | GS | Rec | Yds | Avg | Lng | TD | Att | Yds | Avg | Lng | TD | Ret | Yds | Avg | Lng | TD | Ret | Yds | Avg | Lng | TD | Fum | Lost |
|---|---|---|---|---|---|---|---|---|---|---|---|---|---|---|---|---|---|---|---|---|---|---|---|---|---|
| 2006 | CHI | 16 | 0 | — | — | — | — | — | — | — | — | — | — | 20 | 528 | 26.4 | 96T | **2** | **47** | 600 | 12.8 | 84T | 3 | **8** | **2** |
| 2007 | CHI | 16 | 0 | 20 | 299 | **15.0** | **81T** | 2 | **7** | −10 | −1.4 | 5 | 0 | 43 | 934 | 21.7 | 97T | **2** | 42 | **651** | 15.5 | **89T** | **4** | 7 | 1 |
| 2008 | CHI | 15 | 8 | 51 | 665 | 13.0 | 65T | 3 | 6 | **61** | **10.2** | **20** | 0 | 31 | 679 | 21.9 | 51 | 0 | 32 | 198 | 6.2 | 25 | 0 | 5 | **2** |
| 2009 | CHI | 13 | 12 | **57** | **757** | 13.3 | 48 | 3 | 6 | −1 | −0.2 | 7 | 0 | 7 | 156 | 22.3 | 44 | 0 | 24 | 187 | 7.8 | 33 | 0 | 3 | 1 |
| 2010 | CHI | 16 | 13 | 40 | 475 | 11.9 | 39 | **4** | **7** | 30 | 4.3 | 11 | 0 | 12 | 427 | **35.6** | 79 | 0 | 33 | 564 | **17.1** | **89T** | 3 | 0 | 0 |
| 2011 | CHI | 16 | 8 | 26 | 369 | 14.2 | 53 | 1 | 1 | −6 | −6.0 | −6 | 0 | 33 | 723 | 21.9 | **98T** | 1 | 28 | 454 | 16.2 | 82T | 2 | 5 | 0 |
| 2012 | CHI | 15 | 5 | 23 | 242 | 10.5 | 39 | 1 | 3 | 6 | 2.0 | 8 | 0 | 24 | 621 | 25.9 | 40 | 0 | 40 | 331 | 8.3 | 44 | 0 | 1 | 0 |
| 2013 | CHI | 16 | 0 | — | — | — | — | — | — | — | — | — | — | **52** | **1,436** | 27.6 | 80 | 0 | 18 | 256 | 14.2 | 81T | 1 | 5 | 1 |
| 2014 | ATL | 16 | 1 | 38 | 504 | 13.3 | 46 | 2 | 6 | 36 | 6.0 | **20T** | **1** | 45 | 1,128 | 25.1 | 66 | 0 | 18 | 240 | 13.3 | 68 | 1 | 2 | 1 |
| 2015 | ATL | 5 | 0 | — | — | — | — | — | — | — | — | — | — | 9 | 235 | 26.1 | 35 | 0 | 8 | 34 | 4.3 | 11 | 0 | 0 | 0 |
| 2016 | BAL | 12 | 0 | — | — | — | — | — | — | — | — | — | — | 19 | 466 | 24.5 | 60 | 0 | 25 | 180 | 7.2 | 28 | 0 | 5 | 1 |
| Career | | 156 | 47 | 255 | 3,311 | 13.0 | 81T | 16 | 36 | 116 | 3.2 | 20T | 1 | 295 | 7,333 | 24.9 | 98T | 5 | 315 | 3,695 | 11.7 | 89T | 14 | 41 | 9 |

=== Postseason ===
| Year | Team | Games | | Receiving | | | | | Rushing | | | | | Kick returns | | | | | Punt returns | | | | | Fumbles | |
| Year | Team | GP | GS | Rec | Yds | Avg | Lng | TD | Att | Yds | Avg | Lng | TD | Ret | Yds | Avg | Lng | TD | Ret | Yds | Avg | Lng | TD | Fum | Lost |
|---|---|---|---|---|---|---|---|---|---|---|---|---|---|---|---|---|---|---|---|---|---|---|---|---|---|
| 2006 | CHI | 3 | 0 | — | — | — | — | — | — | — | — | — | — | **7** | 184 | 26.3 | **92T** | **1** | **6** | 32 | 5.3 | 14 | 0 | **3** | 0 |
| 2010 | CHI | 2 | 2 | **2** | **4** | **2.0** | **6** | 0 | — | — | — | — | — | 2 | 30 | 15.0 | 24 | 0 | 5 | **46** | **9.2** | **26** | 0 | 0 | 0 |
| 2016 | SEA | 2 | 0 | — | — | — | — | — | — | — | — | — | — | 6 | **214** | **35.7** | 78 | 0 | 2 | 5 | 2.5 | 5 | 0 | 0 | 0 |
| Career | | 7 | 2 | 2 | 4 | 2.0 | 6 | 0 | 0 | 0 | 0.0 | 0 | 0 | 15 | 428 | 28.5 | 92T | 1 | 13 | 83 | 6.4 | 26 | 0 | 3 | 0 |

In a 2006 regular season game against the New York Giants, Hester returned a missed field goal 108 yards for a touchdown, giving him 6 total TDs on the season.

== Career highlights ==
=== Awards and honors ===
NFL

- 3× First-team All-Pro (2006, 2007, 2010)
- Second-team All-Pro (2011)
- 4× Pro Bowl (2006, 2007, 2010, 2014)
- 2× NFL kickoff return yards leader (2013, 2014)
- 2× NFL punt return yards leader (2006, 2010)
- 3× NFL Alumni Special Teams Player of the Year (2006, 2007, 2010)
- NFL 2000s All-Decade Team
- NFL 2010s All-Decade Team
- NFL 100th Anniversary All-Time Team
- PFWA All-Rookie Team (2006)
- 100 Greatest Bears of All-Time
- 2× NFL Top 100 — 32nd (2011), 48th (2012)

College

- First-team All-American (2004)
- 2× First-team All-ACC (2004, 2005)
- University of Miami Sports Hall of Fame

Other

- Chicagoland Sports Hall of Fame

=== Records ===
==== NFL records ====
- Combined special teams return touchdowns, career: 20 (14 punts, 5 kickoffs, 1 missed field goal)
- Most special teams touchdowns, career: 20
- Most kick and punt return touchdowns, career: 19
- Punt return touchdowns, career: 14
- Punt return touchdowns, season: 4 (2007)
- Kick return touchdowns, game: 2 (Chicago Bears at St. Louis Rams, December 11, 2006)
  - tied with many other players
- Combined return touchdowns, season: 6 (2007) (4 punts, 2 kickoffs)
- Combined return touchdowns, rookie, season: 6 (2006) (3 punts, 2 kickoffs, 1 missed field goal)
- Combined return touchdowns, game: 2, twice
  - 2, Chicago Bears at St. Louis Rams, December 11, 2006 (2 kickoffs)
  - 2, Chicago Bears vs. Denver Broncos, November 25, 2007 (1 punt, 1 kickoff)
- Non-offensive touchdowns, season: 6, twice
  - 6, 2006 (3 punts, 2 kickoffs, 1 missed field goal)
  - 6, 2007 (4 punts, 2 kickoffs)
- Fastest Touchdown in Super Bowl history: 14 seconds

==== Chicago Bears franchise records ====
- Most punt returns, lifetime: 264
- Most punt return yards, lifetime: 3,241 yards
- Most punt return yards, season: 651 yards (2007)
- Most punt return yards, game: 152 yards, at Arizona Cardinals, October 16, 2006
- Highest average, yards per punt return, season [min. 15 returns]: 17.1 (2010)
  - Hester returned 33 punts for 564 yards.
- Highest average, yards per punt return, game [min. 3 returns]: 40.7, vs. Detroit Lions, November 13, 2011
  - Hester returned 3 punts for 122 yards.
- Most punt return touchdowns, lifetime: 14
- Most punt return touchdowns, season: 4
- Most punt return touchdowns, game: 1
  - Achieved several times and tied with many players
- Most punt return fair catches, lifetime: 79
- Most kick returns, lifetime: 222
- Most kick return yards, lifetime: 5,510 yards
- Most kick return yards, game: 249 yards, vs. Minnesota Vikings, September 15, 2013
- Highest average, yards per kickoff return, game [min. 3 returns]: 56.3, at St. Louis Rams, December 11, 2006
  - Hester returned 4 kickoffs for 225 yards.
- Most kick return touchdowns, game: 2, at St. Louis Rams, December 11, 2006
- Most combined return yards, lifetime: 8,751 yards (p-3,241, k-5,510)
- Most combined return yards, game: 314 yards, at Detroit Lions, September 30, 2007 (p-95, k-219)
- Most combined return touchdowns, lifetime: 20 (p-14, k-5, missed fg-1)
- Most combined return touchdowns, season: 6 in 2006 (p-3, k-2, missed fg-1)

6 in 2007 (p-4, k-2)

- Most combined return touchdowns, game: 2, twice
  - 2, at St. Louis Rams, December 11, 2006 (2 kick)
  - 2, vs. Denver Broncos, November 25, 2007 (1 punt, 1 kick)
- Longest play: 108 yards, at New York Giants, November 12, 2006
  - tied with Nathan Vasher

== Personal life ==
Hester was in a relationship with Tamara James, a women's basketball player he met at the University of Miami. James played professionally for the Washington Mystics of the WNBA. Their engagement was later called off. Later, Hester married Zingha Walcott, an elementary school teacher, in 2010. They have three sons and live in Windermere, Florida. Hester's family lives in Florida and was struck by Hurricane Wilma in 2005. Hester has assisted his family financially in helping them rebuild their home. His brother Lenorris Jr., lived with Hester during his tenure with the Bears. Raised in a Christian household, Hester brought a Bible to every game he played. Hester is also cousins with Aaron Hester who played for the Edmonton Eskimos of the Canadian Football League.

Hester's successful rookie year drew him much publicity and popularity. He eventually signed an endorsement deal with Under Armour.

There was also a surge in the demand for Hester's jerseys within the Chicago area sporting stores. Hester was invited to throw the ceremonial opening pitch and sing "Take Me Out to the Ball Game" at the Chicago Cubs' 2007 home opener. Along with teammates Rex Grossman and Tommie Harris, Hester appeared on the February 2007 issue of Sports Illustrated for Kids. Hester's perfect 100 speed rating in EA Sports' Madden NFL 08 made him the fastest player in the game's history. He appeared in commercials for Under Armour in 2008 and 2009. In 2013, Hester outran a cheetah in a race sponsored by National Geographic at Busch Gardens Tampa. The competition consisted of Hester running back and forth on a straight track to simulate laps, while the cheetah ran in a similar but separate track. In 2013, Hester founded the Anytime 23 Empowerment Center Inc., a non-profit organization that serves as a positive, nurturing and safe environment for kids ages 6–18. The organization was later renamed to "Devin Hester Foundation".
