= Aaron Hester =

American gridiron football player (born 1990)

Profile
- Position: Cornerback

Personal information
- Born: March 1, 1990 (age 36); Los Angeles, California, U.S.
- Listed height: 6 ft 2 in (1.88 m)
- Listed weight: 198 lb (90 kg)

Career information
- College: UCLA
- NFL draft: 2013: undrafted

Career history
- Denver Broncos (2013)*; Detroit Lions (2014)*; San Diego Chargers (2014)*; Kansas City Chiefs (2015)*; Edmonton Eskimos (2015)*
- * Offseason or practice squad member only
- Stats at Pro Football Reference

Aaron Sutton Hester (born March 1, 1990) is an American former professional football cornerback. He played college football at UCLA. Hester signed with the Denver Broncos as an undrafted free agent in 2013.

== Early life ==
He attended Dominguez High School in Compton, California. He was selected to the Cal-Hi Sports All-State first-team. He was selected to CIF-Southern Section Western Division team. He was lettered in Track and Field while at High School for three years where he was a Three-time All-State performer.

College recruiting
Name	Hometown	School	Height	Weight	40^{‡}	Commit date
Aaron Hester; Cornerback	Compton, California	Dominguez High School	6 ft 0 in (1.83 m)	180 lb (82 kg)	4.44	Mar 9, 2007
Aaron Hester; Cornerback	Recruit ratings: Scout: Rivals:					
Overall recruit ranking: Scout: 19 (CB) Rivals: 7 (CB), 63 (National), 8 (California)
‡ Refers to 40-yard dash; Note: In many cases, Scout, Rivals, 247Sports, On3, and ESPN may conflict in their listings of height, weight and 40 time.; In these cases, the average was taken. ESPN grades are on a 100-point scale.; Sources: "2008 UCLA Bruins Football Commitments". Rivals.; "2008 UCLA Bruins Football Recruiting Commits". Scout.; "Scout.com Team Recruiting Rankings". Scout.; "2008 Team Ranking". Rivals.com.

== College career ==
He played College football at UCLA. He finished college with a total of 131 Tackles, 5 Interceptions, including one on USC quarterback Matt Barkley on the very first play from scrimmage on November 17, 2012 in UCLA's first victory over crosstown rival USC since 2006. Hester had 22 pass deflections and one forced fumble. He was selected to participate in the 2013 East-West Shrine Game alongside his UCLA teammate cornerback Sheldon Price on the West team.

== Professional career ==
Pre-draft measurables
Height	Weight	Arm length	Hand span	40-yard dash	20-yard shuttle	Three-cone drill	Vertical jump	Broad jump
6 ft 2 in (1.88 m)	198 lb (90 kg)	32 1/2 in (0.83 m)	10 3/8 in (0.26 m)	4.62 s	4.33 s	7.26 s	29.0 in (0.74 m)	9 ft 4 in (2.84 m)
All values from the NFL Combine

=== Denver Broncos ===
On April 27, 2013, he signed with the Denver Broncos as an undrafted free agent. On August 30, 2013, he was released.

=== Detroit Lions ===
On April 21, 2014, he signed with the Detroit Lions as an unrestricted free agent. The Lions released Hester on August 25, 2014.

=== San Diego Chargers ===
On October 8, 2014, he signed with the San Diego Chargers.

=== Kansas City Chiefs ===
On December 31, 2014, Hester signed a futures contract with the Kansas City Chiefs.

=== Edmonton Eskimos ===
Hester was signed to the practice roster of the Edmonton Eskimos in October 2015.

== Personal life ==
He is the son of Alan Hester and Latonya Dorsey. He is cousins with Pro Football Hall of Fame inductee Devin Hester.
