= Southside High School (Greenville, South Carolina) =

Coordinates: 34°47′50″N 82°24′8″W

Location
- 6630 Frontage Road; Greenville, South Carolina 29605; United States

Information
- Type: Public
- Motto: "Celebrating Diversity. United in Learning"
- Principal: Tatiana Shea
- Teaching staff: 68.62 (FTE)
- Grades: 9–12
- Enrollment: 1,075 (2024–2025)
- Student to teacher ratio: 15.67
- Colors: Orange; Black
- Mascot: Tiger
- Yearbook: Invictus
- Website: www.greenville.k12.sc.us/southside

Southside High School is one of 15 public high schools that are part of the Greenville, South Carolina County Schools System. It is the first school in South Carolina to be home to an International Baccalaureate Diploma Program.

== Advanced Placement and IB Diploma Programs ==
Southside is the first high school in South Carolina to offer an International Baccalaureate Diploma Program and Advanced Placement Program. Many courses taught at the school incorporate expected materials from both programs. In addition, the IB Middle Years Program was implemented during the Fall of 2006.

== School activities ==
=== Sports ===
- Basketball
- Football
- Soccer
- Tennis
- Cross Country
- Volleyball
- Track and Field
- Cheerleading
- Baseball
- Softball

=== Extra Curricular Programs ===
- Academic Team
- STEAM Team
- Speech and Debate
- Marching Band
- Symphonic Band
- Various Air Force JROTC clubs

== Major accomplishments ==
- 1980 AA State Basketball Champions
- 1990 AA State Track Runner-Up
- 1991 AA State Basketball Runner-up (upper state champions)
- 1992 AA State Basketball Champions
- 1993 AA State Basketball Runner-Up (Upper state champions)
- 1994 South Carolina Leading Forensics Chapter
- 1997 AAA State Track Champions
- 1997 South Carolina Speech and Debate Champions
- 2003 AA State Champions in Forensics; Overall State Champions in Forensics
- 2006 Relay For Life Most money raised by a High School
- 2007 AA Upper-State Boys' Basketball Champions (27-1) season
- 2008 AA State Boys' Basketball Champions
- 2008 AA State Champions in Forensics; South Carolina District Tournament Sweepstakes Winner in Forensics
- 2009 AA State Boys' Basketball Champions
- 2009 AA State 4x4 Relay Champions
- 2009 State Champions in Forensics; South Carolina Districts Tournament Sweepstakes Winner in Forensics
- 2010 State Champions in Forensics
- 2010 AA State Girls' Basketball Champions
- 2012 AAA Boys' Basketball Upper-State Champions
- 2017 AAA Boys' Basketball State Champions
- 2019 AAA Boys' Cross Country Upper-State Champions
- 2021 Academic Team State Champions

== Notable alumni ==
- Michael Hamilton, former NFL player
