= Michael Hamilton (American football) =

American football player (born 1973)

No. 53, 50
- Position: Linebacker

Personal information
- Born: December 3, 1973 (age 52); Greenville, South Carolina, U.S.
- Listed height: 6 ft 2 in (1.88 m)
- Listed weight: 245 lb (111 kg)

Career information
- High school: Southside (Greenville, South Carolina)
- College: North Carolina A&T
- NFL draft: 1997: 3rd round, 74th overall pick

Career history
- San Diego Chargers (1997–1999); Miami Dolphins (2000); Cleveland Browns (2000)

Awards and highlights
- First-team All-MEAC (1995)

Career NFL statistics
- Tackles: 23
- Fumble recoveries: 1
- Passes defended: 1
- Stats at Pro Football Reference

Michael Antonio Hamilton (born December 3, 1973) is an American former professional football player who was a linebacker for four seasons in the National Football League (NFL), primarily with the San Diego Chargers. He played college football for the North Carolina A&T Aggies

Hamilton was born in Greenville, South Carolina. As a high school student he played basketball, football and participated in track and field. He won the state championship as a basketball player his senior year. In track and field he was also a state champion as a junior and senior in the 400-meter run and the 400-meter relay. Hamilton only played football his senior year in high school. He was a dominant defensive end and was named Southside High School's "Athlete Of The Year" in 1992.

Despite only playing one year of high school football, Hamilton received a full athletic scholarship to North Carolina Agricultural and Technical State University. There, he majored in biology. As a redshirt freshman, Hamilton made an immediate impact as an outside linebacker. He was named the "Mid-Eastern Athletic Conference Rookie of the Week" four times. He was also an All Conference Player in his college career. In 1996, Hamilton received his Bachelor of Science with honors.

After his collegiate career, Hamilton was selected in the third round of the 1997 NFL Draft by the San Diego Chargers. During his career in the NFL, Hamilton was a key Special Teams Player and understudy to the late NFL great Junior Seau. He was named "Special Teams Player of the Game" in a matchup against the Baltimore Ravens in 1998 and the "Defensive Player of the Game" in a competition against the Cleveland Browns in 1999. Hamilton also scored his first NFL touchdown as a pro in a preseason game against the St. Louis Rams in 1998, scoring on a 75-yard interception return.

After leaving the Chargers, Hamilton played with the Miami Dolphins and Cleveland Browns before officially retiring in 2004.

Hamilton is the CEO and Founder of Big Kidd International Sports. In this role, he travels the world training athletes. The organization has held football training camps in Paris, France and Rio de Janeiro, Brazil.

Hamilton is active with the NFL, the NFL Players Association, and the alumni associations of the San Diego Chargers, the Cleveland Browns, and the Miami Dolphins.
