= Dave Toub =

American football coach (born 1962)

Kansas City Chiefs
- Title: Assistant head coach & special teams coordinator

Personal information
- Born: June 1, 1962 (age 64); Ossining, New York, U.S.

Career information
- Position: Offensive lineman
- College: UTEP
- NFL draft: 1985: 9th round, 231st overall pick

Career history

Playing
- Philadelphia Eagles (1985)*; Los Angeles Rams (1986)*
- * Offseason or practice squad member only

Coaching
- UTEP (1986–1988); Graduate assistant (1986); Strength and conditioning coach (1987–1988); Missouri (1989–2000); Strength and conditioning coach (1989–1997); Defensive line coach (1998–2000); Philadelphia Eagles (2001–2003) Special teams & quality control coach; Chicago Bears (2004–2012) Special teams coordinator; Kansas City Chiefs (2013–present); Special teams coordinator (2013–2017); Assistant head coach & special teams coordinator (2018–present)

Awards and highlights
- As coach: 3× Super Bowl champion (LIV, LVII, LVIII); As player: 2× All-Western Athletic Conference

David Toub (born June 1, 1962) is an American professional football coach who is the assistant head coach and special teams coordinator for the Kansas City Chiefs of the National Football League (NFL).

Toub was the special teams coordinator named to ESPN's 2025 "All Quarter Century" team, due to his having "coordinated a top-five special teams unit in every season from 2006 (when ESPN's efficiency ratings began) to 2017, including the postseason."

== Playing career ==
=== College ===
Toub played offensive line at Springfield College from 1980 to 1981 and at the University of Texas-El Paso (UTEP) from 1983 to 1984. At UTEP, Toub earned All-WAC selections twice.

=== Professional ===
Toub was drafted by the Philadelphia Eagles in the ninth round of the 1985 NFL draft. He was released before the start of the regular season. Later, Toub attended the Los Angeles Rams training camp in two consecutive years, but was released before the start of the regular season.

== Coaching career ==
=== College ===
Toub began his coaching career at the University of Texas-El Paso in 1986. His first year was as a graduate assistant; the next two years he was the strength and conditioning coach. Toub then spent nine years as the strength and conditioning coach at the University of Missouri; also coaching offensive line from 1989 to 1991 with Andy Reid. Afterwards, Toub coached the defensive line for three years.

=== Philadelphia Eagles ===
In 2001, Toub began his coaching career in the National Football League with the Philadelphia Eagles as the special teams/quality control coach.

=== Chicago Bears ===
Toub joined the Chicago Bears coaching staff on January 24, 2004, as the special teams coordinator. On February 27, 2007, Toub signed a three-year extension with the Bears, keeping him under contract through the 2009 season. The Bears' special teams unit was highly successful in 2006; kicker Robbie Gould, return specialist Devin Hester, and gunner Brendon Ayanbadejo were voted to the 2007 Pro Bowl. On April 5, 2007, Toub was voted special teams coach of the year by his peers. His special teams unit was ranked at the top of the league for the 2006 and 2007 seasons. For the last eight years, the Bears special teams have been in the top three, and was ranked third by rankings performed by the Dallas Morning News. In 2008 he was elected to the USA Today All-Joe team. In 2012, he signed a two-year extension with the team.

=== Kansas City Chiefs ===
On January 15, 2013, Toub announced that he would leave Chicago and accept a position with the Kansas City Chiefs and reunite with Andy Reid. In 2018, he received the assistant head coach title in addition to his special teams coordinator duties. In 2019, Toub won his first Super Bowl when the Chiefs defeated the San Francisco 49ers 31–20 in Super Bowl LIV. In 2022, Toub won his second Super Bowl when the Chiefs defeated the Philadelphia Eagles 38–35 in Super Bowl LVII. In 2023, Toub won his third Super Bowl when the Chiefs again defeated the San Francisco 49ers 25–22 in Super Bowl LVIII.

== Personal life ==
Toub is married and has a son and daughter. His son Shane is the assistant offensive line coach for the Washington Commanders and played center for the Dayton Flyers in the mid-2010s.
