= Patrick Sapp =

American football player (born 1973)

No. 56, 55, 94
- Position: Linebacker

Personal information
- Born: May 11, 1973 (age 53); Jacksonville, Florida, U.S.
- Listed height: 6 ft 4 in (1.93 m)
- Listed weight: 258 lb (117 kg)

Career information
- High school: William M. Raines (Jacksonville, Florida)
- College: Clemson
- NFL draft: 1996: 2nd round, 50th overall pick

Career history
- San Diego Chargers (1996–1997); Arizona Cardinals (1998–1999); Indianapolis Colts (2000)*; Memphis Maniax (2001)
- * Offseason or practice squad member only

Career NFL statistics
- Tackles: 100
- Sacks: 2
- Forced fumbles: 1
- Stats at Pro Football Reference

Patrick Sapp (born May 11, 1973) is an American former professional football player who was a linebacker in the National Football League (NFL) and the XFL. He played college football for the Clemson Tigers.

== Biography ==
Sapp was selected in the second round of the 1996 NFL draft with the 50th overall pick. Sapp played for the San Diego Chargers and Arizona Cardinals. He played for the San Diego Chargers from 1996 to 1997, and was traded to the Arizona Cardinals along with Eric Metcalf, the Chargers 1st (#3 overall) and 2nd-round picks in 1998 and the Chargers 1st-round pick in 1999 for the Cardinals 1st-round pick in 1998 (#2 overall). The Chargers drafted with that pick Ryan Leaf. Sapp was the starting quarterback for the Clemson Tigers football team, before moving to linebacker.

== Personal life ==
His son, Josh, is a tight end for Clemson.
