= Paul Bradford (American football) =

American football player (born 1974)

No. 25, 23
- Position: Cornerback

Personal information
- Born: April 20, 1974 (age 52); East Palo Alto, California, U.S.
- Listed height: 5 ft 9 in (1.75 m)
- Listed weight: 185 lb (84 kg)

Career information
- High school: Carlmot (Belmont, California)
- College: Portland State
- NFL draft: 1997: 5th round, 146th overall pick

Career history
- San Diego Chargers (1997–1998); Minnesota Vikings (2000)*; Las Vegas Outlaw (2001)
- * Offseason or practice squad member only

Career NFL statistics
- Total tackles: 23
- Interceptions: 2
- Fumble recoveries: 1
- Touchdowns: 2
- Stats at Pro Football Reference

Paul L. Bradford (born April 20, 1974) is an American former professional football player who was a cornerback in the National Football League (NFL). He played college football for the Portland State Vikings. He was selected by the San Diego Chargers in the fifth round of the 1997 NFL draft.

== Early life ==
Bradford attended Carlmont High School, where he was an All-state honorable mention football player. He then attended College of San Mateo and lettered twice in football. He then transferred to Portland State University where he majored in physical education. In two seasons with the Vikings, he recorded 80 tackles, four interceptions, and 13 pass deflections.

== Professional career ==
Bradford was selected in the fifth round (146th overall) by the San Diego Chargers. As a rookie, he appeared in 15 games with four starts. All four starts came at left cornerback. He recorded 23 total tackles, two interceptions (one for a touchdown), one fumble recovery (for a touchdown) and seven passes defensed. He recorded his first interception while replacing Dwayne Harper during Week 10 against the Seattle Seahawks, intercepting Warren Moon, it was also his only interception returned for a touchdown. He started in place of the injured Harper the next week, intercepting a Jeff George pass intended James Jett. On August 15, 1998, he re-signed with the Chargers. In 1998, he injured his knee and was placed on injured reserve, resulting in his missing the entire season. He was re-signed by the Chargers on April 2, 1999. He was released on September 5, 1999. On March 7, 2000, he was signed by the Minnesota Vikings. He was released on July 5, 2000.

Bradford was selected in the sixth (44th overall) in the 2001 XFL draft by the Las Vegas Outlaws.

== Personal life ==
Bradford is married to his wife Margarita, the couple have 2 daughters and 2 sons, and reside in East Palo Alto.
