= 1994 Kansas City Chiefs season =

NFL team season

- Owner: Lamar Hunt
- General manager: Carl Peterson
- Head coach: Marty Schottenheimer
- Offensive coordinator: Paul Hackett
- Defensive coordinator: Dave Adolph
- Home stadium: Arrowhead Stadium

Results
- Record: 9–7
- Division place: 2nd AFC West
- Playoffs: Lost Wild Card Playoffs (at Dolphins) 17–27
- All-Pros: 1: LB Derrick Thomas (2nd team)
- Pro Bowlers: 3: DE Neil Smith; LB Derrick Thomas; CB Dale Carter

The 1994 Kansas City Chiefs season was the franchise's 25th season in the National Football League, the 32nd as the Kansas City Chiefs and the 35th overall. They failed to improve their 11–5 record from 1993 and finishing with a 9–7 record and Wild Card spot in the 1994–95 playoffs. The Chiefs lost to the Miami Dolphins 27–17 in the wild-card round. Alongside celebrating the NFL's 75th anniversary season, Hall of Fame quarterback Joe Montana retired following the season.

By playing their first four games vs. the NFC West, the Chiefs became the first AFC team to play its first four games against NFC teams since the AFL–NFL merger. The first team to play four inter-conference games to open a season were the 1992 Los Angeles Rams.

1994 was the first season that the playing surface at Arrowhead Stadium was natural grass. It had previously been TartanTurf from 1972 to 1993.

== Offseason ==
| Additions | Subtractions |
|---|---|
| QB Steve Bono (49ers) | QB Dave Krieg (Lions) |
| TE Derrick Walker (Chargers) | RB Todd McNair (Oilers) |
| NT Greg Kragen (Broncos) | T Reggie McElroy (Vikings) |
| WR Eric Martin (Saints) | RB Harvey Williams (Raiders) |
| CB Mark Collins (Giants) | CB Kevin Ross (Falcons) |
| LB Greg Manusky (Vikings) | S Martin Bayless (Redskins) |
| P Louie Aguiar (Jets) | TE Jonathan Hayes (Steelers) |
| S William White (Lions) | CB Albert Lewis (Raiders) |
| | P Bryan Barker (Eagles) |
| | K Nick Lowery (Jets) |

=== Draft ===
1994 Kansas City Chiefs draft
| Round | Pick | Player | Position | College | Notes |
| 1 | 25 | Greg Hill | Running back | Texas A&M | |
| 2 | 58 | Donnell Bennett | Running back | Miami (FL) | |
| 3 | 92 | Lake Dawson | Wide receiver | Notre Dame | |
| 3 | 96 | Chris Penn | Wide receiver | Tulsa | |
| 4 | 127 | Bracy Walker | Defensive back | North Carolina | |
| 5 | 151 | James Burton | Defensive back | Fresno State | |
| 5 | 156 | Rob Waldrop | Defensive tackle | Arizona | |
| 6 | 185 | Anthony Daigle | Running back | Fresno State | |
| 7 | 199 | Steve Matthews | Quarterback | Memphis | |
| 7 | 219 | Tracy Greene | Tight end | Grambling State | |
Made roster

=== Undrafted free agents ===
1994 undrafted free agents of note
| Player | Position | College |
|---|---|---|
| Ken Alexander | Linebacker | Florida State |
| Dunstan Anderson | Defensive end | Tulsa |
| Byron Bonds | Defensive tackle | SMU |
| Larry Boyd | Defensive end | Arizona State |
| Elvin Caldwell | Guard | Purdue |
| Jerry Freese | Linebacker | Northeastern Oklahoma State |
| Robert Gaddy | Tackle | Alcorn State |
| Monty Grow | Safety | Florida |
| Bernardo Harris | Linebacker | North Carolina |

== Personnel ==
=== Staff ===
1994 Kansas City Chiefs staff
| Front office: Founder – Lamar Hunt; Chairman of the Board – Jack Steadman; President/General Manager/Chief Executive Officer – Carl Peterson; Assistant General Manager – Dennis Thum; Vice President of Player Personnel – Lynn Stiles; Director of Pro Personnel – Mark Hatley; Director of College Scouting – Terry Bradway; Head coaches: Head Coach – Marty Schottenheimer; Assistant Head Coach/Wide Receivers – Al Saunders; Offensive coaches: Offensive Coordinator/Quarterbacks – Paul Hackett; Running Backs – Jimmy Raye; Tight Ends – Kurt Schottenheimer; Offensive Line – Alex Gibbs; Offensive Assistant/Quality Control – Mike McCarthy | Defensive coaches: Defensive Coordinator/Linebackers – Dave Adolph; Defensive Line – Tom Pratt; Defensive Backs – Herman Edwards; Defensive Assistant – John Bunting; Defensive Assistant/Quality Control – Darvin Wallis; Special teams coaches: Special Teams – Kurt Schottenheimer; Strength and conditioning: Strength and Conditioning – Dave Redding; Assistant Strength and Conditioning – Russ Ball |

=== Roster ===
1994 Kansas City Chiefs roster
| Quarterbacks (QB): 14 Matt Blundin; 13 Steve Bono; 19 Joe Montana; Running backs (RB): 32 Marcus Allen; 38 Kimble Anders; 29 Greg Hill; 21 Jon Vaughn; Wide receivers (WR): 88 J. J. Birden; 84 Willie Davis; 80 Lake Dawson; 83 Danan Hughes; 85 Eric Martin; 81 Chris Penn; Tight ends (TE): 89 Keith Cash; 87 Tracy Greene; 45 Jimmie Johnson; 47 Tommie Stowers; 82 Derrick Walker | Offensive linemen (OL): 76 John Alt T; 74 Derrick Graham T; 61 Tim Grunhard C; 65 Lindsay Knapp G; 68 Will Shields G; 66 Ricky Siglar T; 79 Dave Szott G; 73 Joe Valerio; 72 Danny Villa; Defensive linemen (DL): 99 Vaughn Booker DE; 71 Greg Kragen DT; 92 Darren Mickell DE; 75 Joe Phillips DT; 97 Dan Saleaumua DT; 90 Neil Smith DE; 98 Rob Waldrop DT | Linebackers (LB): 50 Anthony Davis OLB; 53 Rick Hamilton MLB; 57 George Jamison OLB; 51 Greg Manusky; 52 Tracy Rogers OLB; 54 Tracy Simien MLB; 58 Derrick Thomas OLB; 55 Ronnie Woolfork OLB; Defensive backs (DB): 44 Darren Anderson CB; 34 Dale Carter CB; 25 Mark Collins CB; 22 Monty Grow FS; 42 Charles Mincy S; 27 Jay Taylor CB; 24 Doug Terry SS; 35 William White FS; 41 David Whitmore SS; Special teams (ST): 5 Louie Aguiar P; 2 Lin Elliott K | Practice squad: -- Perry Carter CB; 6 Allen DeGraffenreid WR; 49 Matt Gay S; 64 Emerson Martin G; 60 Garry Pay C; Reserve: 56 Arnold Ale LB (IR); 30 Donnell Bennett RB (IR); 23 Ron Dickerson RB (IR); 59 Jaime Fields LB (IR); 46 Victor Jones RB (IR); 15 Steve Matthews QB (NF-Inj.); 77 Pellom McDaniels DE (IR); 96 Tim Newton DT (IR); 26 Tim Watson S (IR); 53 active, 9 inactive, 5 practice squad Rookies in italics |

== Season summary ==
After an opening day win over the New Orleans Saints, the Chiefs faced the San Francisco 49ers on September 11. Facing his old team, Joe Montana led the Chiefs to a 24–17 win at Arrowhead. But after opening the season at 3–0, the Chiefs dropped 2 in a row to the Rams and Chargers.

On October 17, a 6-yard pass and a tightrope run into the end zone ended the Chiefs' 11-year drought in Mile High Stadium. Joe Montana and the Chiefs faced a 4-point deficit on Monday Night Football. The final drive in the final 82 seconds took nine plays, all of them Montana passes except one run of 10 yards by Marcus Allen; Montana's final pass was a five-yard score to Willie Davis for the 31–28 Kansas City win. For the game, Montana hit 34 of 54 pass attempts for 393 yards and 3 touchdowns and the Chiefs, now 4–2, had now thrust themselves back into the playoff hunt. The game was tied 14–14 at the half. Lin Elliott's field goal with 4:08 left in the game temporarily put the Chiefs ahead 24–21. A Marcus Allen fumble set up the Broncos' final touchdown, but Montana and his inspiring confidence resulted in the comeback.

Montana would have another great season, passing for 3,283 yards. The rushing game improved from 1993 as the Chiefs rushed for 1,732 yards and twelve touchdowns (up from the previous year's 1,655 yards). Allen's game trailed off from 1993 as he gained 709 yards to lead the team (to 764 the previous year), while rookie Greg Hill managed only 574 yards for the season. Fullback Kimble Anders was the leading receiver with 67 receptions. The defense showed flashes of brilliance as it improved to seventh in fewest points allowed from 1993's ninth, and as had become the standard, was led by perennial Pro Bowlers Derrick Thomas and Neil Smith. Defensive back Dale Carter had a superb year and was also chosen for the Pro Bowl.

On December 24, Marcus Allen gained 132 yards rushing as the Chiefs beat the Los Angeles Raiders 19–9 in the last Raiders game ever as host in Los Angeles. The win secured a fifth-straight playoff spot for the Chiefs.

== Preseason ==
| Week | Date | Opponent | Result | Record | Venue | Attendance | Recap |
|---|---|---|---|---|---|---|---|
| 1 | July 31 | Houston Oilers | W 24–17 | 1–0 | Arrowhead Stadium | 70,732 | Recap |
| 2 | August 7 | vs. Minnesota Vikings | L 9–17 | 1–1 | (Japan) Tokyo Dome (Tokyo) | 49,555 | Recap |
| 3 | August 12 | at Washington Redskins | W 17–14 | 2–1 | RFK Stadium | 40,778 | Recap |
| 4 | August 22 | Chicago Bears | L 18–21 | 2–2 | Arrowhead Stadium | 75,114 | Recap |
| 5 | August 26 | at Buffalo Bills | L 3–24 | 2–3 | Rich Stadium | 46,166 | Recap |

== Regular season ==
=== Schedule ===
| Week | Date | Opponent | Result | Record | Venue | Attendance | Recap |
|---|---|---|---|---|---|---|---|
| 1 | September 4 | at New Orleans Saints | **W** 30–17 | 1–0 | Louisiana Superdome | 69,362 | Recap |
| 2 | September 11 | San Francisco 49ers | **W** 24–17 | 2–0 | Arrowhead Stadium | 79,907 | Recap |
| 3 | September 18 | at Atlanta Falcons | **W** 30–10 | 3–0 | Georgia Dome | 67,357 | Recap |
| 4 | September 25 | Los Angeles Rams | **L** 0–16 | 3–1 | Arrowhead Stadium | 78,184 | Recap |
| 5 | Bye | | | | | | |
| 6 | October 9 | at **San Diego Chargers** | **L** 6–20 | 3–2 | Jack Murphy Stadium | 62,923 | Recap |
| 7 | October 17 | at **Denver Broncos** | **W** 31–28 | 4–2 | Mile High Stadium | 75,151 | Recap |
| 8 | October 23 | **Seattle Seahawks** | **W** 38–23 | 5–2 | Arrowhead Stadium | 78,847 | Recap |
| 9 | October 30 | at Buffalo Bills | **L** 10–44 | 5–3 | Rich Stadium | 79,501 | Recap |
| 10 | November 6 | **Los Angeles Raiders** | **W** 13–3 | 6–3 | Arrowhead Stadium | 78,709 | Recap |
| 11 | November 13 | **San Diego Chargers** | **L** 13–14 | 6–4 | Arrowhead Stadium | 76,997 | Recap |
| 12 | November 20 | Cleveland Browns | **W** 20–13 | 7–4 | Arrowhead Stadium | 69,121 | Recap |
| 13 | November 27 | at **Seattle Seahawks** | **L** 9–10 | 7–5 | Kingdome | 54,120 | Recap |
| 14 | December 4 | **Denver Broncos** | **L** 17–20 (OT) | 7–6 | Arrowhead Stadium | 77,631 | Recap |
| 15 | December 12 | at Miami Dolphins | **L** 28–45 | 7–7 | Joe Robbie Stadium | 71,578 | Recap |
| 16 | December 18 | Houston Oilers | **W** 31–9 | 8–7 | Arrowhead Stadium | 74,474 | Recap |
| 17 | December 24 | at **Los Angeles Raiders** | **W** 19–9 | 9–7 | Los Angeles Memorial Coliseum | 64,130 | Recap |
Note: Intra-division opponents are in **bold** text.

=== Game summaries ===
==== Week 1: at New Orleans Saints ====
Week 1: Kansas City Chiefs at New Orleans Saints – Game summary

| Quarter | 1 | 2 | 3 | 4 | Total |
|---|---|---|---|---|---|
| **Chiefs** | 7 | 10 | 3 | 10 | **30** |
| Saints | 0 | 3 | 7 | 7 | **17** |

at Louisiana Superdome, New Orleans, Louisiana

- Date: September 4
- Game time: 12:00 p.m. CDT
- Game weather: None (indoor stadium)
- Game attendance: 69,362
- Referee: Gary Lane
- TV announcers (NBC): Dick Enberg, Bob Trumpy and Hannah Storm
- Recap, Game Book

Game information

**First quarter**

- KC – Willie Davis 11-yard pass from Joe Montana (Lin Elliott kick), 4:16. Chiefs 7–0. **Drive: 15 plays, 80 yards, 7:23.**

**Second quarter**

- KC – Marcus Allen 1-yard run (Lin Elliott kick), 13:14. Chiefs 14–0. **Drive: 6 plays, 59 yards, 3:19.**
- NO – Morten Andersen 48-yard field goal, 8:27. Chiefs 14–3. **Drive: 8 plays, 43 yards, 4:47.**
- KC – Lin Elliott 24-yard field goal, 0:58. Chiefs 17–3. **Drive: 14 plays, 74 yards, 7:29.**

**Third quarter**

- NO – Wesley Walls 13-yard pass from Jim Everett (Morten Andersen kick), 9:10. Chiefs 17–10. **Drive: 6 plays, 80 yards, 2:56.**
- KC – Lin Elliott 22-yard field goal, 3:18. Chiefs 20–10. **Drive: 15 plays, 75 yards, 5:52.**

**Fourth quarter**

- KC – Keith Cash 2-yard pass from Joe Montana (Lin Elliott kick), 13:12. Chiefs 27–10. **Drive: 2 plays, 25 yards, 0:27.**
- KC – Lin Elliott 27-yard field goal, 7:02. Chiefs 30–10. **Drive: 9 plays, 76 yards, 4:27.**
- NO – Derek Brown 14-yard pass from Jim Everett (Morten Andersen kick), 4:00. Chiefs 30–17. **Drive: 8 plays, 78 yards, 3:02.**

**Top passers**

- KC – Joe Montana – 24/33, 315 yards, 2 TD
- NO – Jim Everett – 26/37, 326 yards, 2 TD, 2 INT

**Top rushers**

- KC – Marcus Allen – 17 rushes, 82 yards, TD
- NO – Derek Brown – 9 rushes, 35 yards

**Top receivers**

- KC – Willie Davis – 7 receptions, 109 yards, TD
- NO – Quinn Early – 8 receptions, 101 yards

==== Week 2: vs. San Francisco 49ers ====
Week 2: San Francisco 49ers at Kansas City Chiefs – Game summary

| Quarter | 1 | 2 | 3 | 4 | Total |
|---|---|---|---|---|---|
| 49ers | 0 | 14 | 0 | 3 | **17** |
| **Chiefs** | 7 | 2 | 15 | 0 | **24** |

at Arrowhead Stadium, Kansas City, Missouri

- Date: September 11
- Game time: 12:00 p.m. CDT
- Game weather: Clear, 83 °F (28 °C)
- Game attendance: 79,907
- Referee: Bob McElwee
- TV announcers (Fox): Pat Summerall, John Madden and Anthony Muñoz
- Recap, Game Book

Game information

**First quarter**

- KC – Joe Valerio 1 yard pass from Joe Montana (Lin Elliott kick), 9:16. Chiefs 7–0. **Drive: 11 plays, 67 yards, 5:44.**

**Second quarter**

- SF – Brent Jones 5-yard pass from Steve Young (Doug Brien kick), 14:57. Tied 7–7. **Drive: 8 plays, 70 yards, 3:38.**
- SF – Marc Logan 1 yard rush (Doug Brien kick), 8:01. 49ers 14–7. **Drive: 10 plays, 55 yards, 5:42.**
- KC – Steve Young sacked in end zone by Derrick Thomas for a Safety, 2:12. 49ers 14–9.

**Third quarter**

- KC – Keith Cash 8-yard pass from Joe Montana (Joe Montana−J. J. Birden pass), 8:43. Chiefs 17–14. **Drive: 8 plays, 57 yards, 3:38.**
- KC – Marcus Allen 4-yard run (Lin Elliott kick), 4:59. Chiefs 24–14. **Drive: 4 plays, 17 yards, 1:25.**

**Fourth quarter**

- SF – Doug Brien 19-yard field goal, 5:34. Chiefs 24–17. **Drive: 12 plays, 78 yards, 5:52.**

**Top passers**

- SF – Steve Young – 24/34, 288 yards, TD, 2 INT
- KC – Joe Montana – 19/31, 203 yards, 2 TD

**Top rushers**

- SF – Ricky Watters – 14 rushes, 59 yards
- KC – Marcus Allen – 20 rushes, 69 yards, TD

**Top receivers**

- SF – Jerry Rice – 5 receptions, 78 yards
- KC – Willie Davis – 4 receptions, 59 yards

==== Week 3: at Atlanta Falcons ====
Week 3: Kansas City Chiefs at Atlanta Falcons – Game summary

| Quarter | 1 | 2 | 3 | 4 | Total |
|---|---|---|---|---|---|
| **Chiefs** | 7 | 3 | 7 | 13 | **30** |
| Falcons | 0 | 0 | 3 | 7 | **10** |

at Georgia Dome, Atlanta, Georgia

- Date: September 18
- Game time: 8:00 p.m. EDT/7:00 p.m. CDT
- Game weather: None (indoor stadium)
- Game attendance: 67,357
- Referee: Johnny Grier
- TV announcers (TNT): Gary Bender, Pat Haden and Kevin Kiley
- Recap, Game Book

Game information

**First quarter**

- KC – J. J. Birden 13-yard pass from Joe Montana (Lin Elliott kick), 10:03. Chiefs 7–0. **Drive: 4 plays, 28 yards, 1:58.**

**Second quarter**

- KC – Lin Elliott 48-yard field goal, 11:33. Chiefs 10–0. **Drive: 6 plays, −9 yards, 2:55.**

**Third quarter**

- KC – Donnell Bennett 4-yard run (Lin Elliott kick), 8:41. Chiefs 17–0. **Drive: 10 plays, 69 yards, 6:19.**
- ATL – Norm Johnson 33-yard field goal, 3:10. Chiefs 17–3. **Drive: 4 plays, 7 yards, 1:32.**

**Fourth quarter**

- KC – Lin Elliott 19-yard field goal, 14:21. Chiefs 20–3. **Drive: 8 plays, 60 yards, 3:49.**
- KC – Lin Elliott 45-yard field goal, 10:53. Chiefs 23–3. **Drive: 6 plays, 19 yards, 2:32.**
- ATL – Andre Rison 25-yard pass from Jeff George (Norm Johnson kick), 8:33. Chiefs 23–10. **Drive: 5 plays, 83 yards, 2:20.**
- KC – J. J. Birden 34-yard pass from Joe Montana (Lin Elliott kick), 6:17. Chiefs 30–10. **Drive: 4 plays, 67 yards, 2:16.**

**Top passers**

- KC – Joe Montana – 28/39, 361 yards, 2 TD, 2 INT
- ATL – Jeff George – 29/45, 299 yards, TD, 2 INT

**Top rushers**

- KC – Greg Hill – 8 rushes, 28 yards
- ATL – Erric Pegram – 14 rushes, 74 yards

**Top receivers**

- KC – J. J. Birden – 7 receptions, 99 yards, 2 TD
- ATL – Terance Mathis – 13 receptions, 123 yards

==== Week 4: vs. Los Angeles Rams ====
Week 4: Los Angeles Rams at Kansas City Chiefs – Game summary

| Quarter | 1 | 2 | 3 | 4 | Total |
|---|---|---|---|---|---|
| **Rams** | 13 | 0 | 3 | 0 | **16** |
| Chiefs | 0 | 0 | 0 | 0 | **0** |

at Arrowhead Stadium, Kansas City, Missouri

- Date: September 25
- Game time: 12:00 p.m. CDT
- Game weather: Mostly cloudy, 68 °F (20 °C)
- Game attendance: 78,184
- Referee: Larry Nemmers
- TV announcers (Fox): Joe Buck and Tim Green
- Recap, Game Book

Game information

**First quarter**

- LA – Tony Zendejas 29-yard field goal, 4:40. Rams 3–0. **Drive: 13 plays, 54 yards, 5:58.**
- LA – Flipper Anderson 72-yard pass from Chris Chandler (Tony Zendejas kick), 2:51. Rams 10–0. **Drive: 2 plays, 72 yards, 0:46.**
- LA – Tony Zendejas 23-yard field goal, 1:17. Rams 13–0. **Drive: 5 plays, 15 yards, 1:17.**

**Second quarter**

- No scoring plays.

**Third quarter**

- LA – Tony Zendejas 28-yard field goal, 3:51. Rams 16–0. **Drive: 9 plays, 39 yards, 4:56.**

**Fourth quarter**

- No scoring plays.

**Top passers**

- LA – Chris Chandler – 13/21, 207 yards, TD
- KC – Joe Montana – 18/37, 175 yards, 3 INT

**Top rushers**

- LA – Jerome Bettis – 35 rushes, 132 yards
- KC – Marcus Allen – 15 rushes, 59 yards

**Top receivers**

- LA – Flipper Anderson – 2 receptions, 83 yards, TD
- KC – Willie Davis – 5 receptions, 74 yards

==== Week 6: at San Diego Chargers ====
Week 6: Kansas City Chiefs at San Diego Chargers – Game summary

| Quarter | 1 | 2 | 3 | 4 | Total |
|---|---|---|---|---|---|
| Chiefs | 0 | 3 | 0 | 3 | **6** |
| **Chargers** | 3 | 10 | 0 | 7 | **20** |

at Jack Murphy Stadium, San Diego, California

- Date: October 9
- Game time: 3:00 p.m. CDT/1:00 p.m. PDT
- Game weather: Clear and sunny, 90 °F (32 °C)
- Game attendance: 62,923
- Referee: Red Cashion
- TV announcers (NBC): Charlie Jones, Randy Cross and Beasley Reece
- Recap, Game Book

Game information

**First quarter**

- SD – John Carney 23-yard field goal, 5:24. Chargers 3–0. **Drive: 11 plays, 47 yards, 5:21.**

**Second quarter**

- KC – Lin Elliott 25-yard field goal, 9:46. Tied 3–3. **Drive: 14 plays, 63 yards, 6:51.**
- SD – John Carney 32-yard field goal, 6:46. Chargers 6–3. **Drive: 6 plays, 64 yards, 3:00.**
- SD – Natrone Means 9-yard run (John Carney kick), 2:56. Chargers 13–3. **Drive: 5 plays, 43 yards, 2:18.**

**Third quarter**

- No scoring plays.

**Fourth quarter**

- KC – Lin Elliott 25-yard field goal, 13:12. Chargers 13–6. **Drive: 10 plays, 62 yards, 4:17.**
- SD – Mark Seay 6-yard pass from Stan Humphries (John Carney kick), 7:47. Chargers 20–6. **Drive: 9 plays, 77 yards, 5:25.**

**Top passers**

- KC – Joe Montana – 37/55, 310 yards, INT
- SD – Stan Humphries – 16/25, 171 yards, TD

**Top rushers**

- KC – Greg Hill – 5 rushes, 45 yards
- SD – Natrone Means – 19 rushes, 125 yards, TD

**Top receivers**

- KC – Marcus Allen – 9 receptions, 83 yards
- SD – Tony Martin – 1 reception, 48 yards

==== Week 7: at Denver Broncos ====
Week 7: Kansas City Chiefs at Denver Broncos – Game summary

| Quarter | 1 | 2 | 3 | 4 | Total |
|---|---|---|---|---|---|
| **Chiefs** | 0 | 14 | 7 | 10 | **31** |
| Broncos | 0 | 14 | 7 | 7 | **28** |

at Mile High Stadium, Denver, Colorado

- Date: October 17
- Game time: 8:00 p.m. CDT/7:00 p.m. MDT
- Game weather: Partly cloudy, 42 °F (6 °C)
- Game attendance: 75,151
- Referee: Jerry Markbreit
- TV announcers (ABC): Al Michaels, Frank Gifford, Dan Dierdorf and Lynn Swann
- Recap, Game Book

Game information

**First quarter**

- No scoring plays.

**Second quarter**

- DEN – Leonard Russell 12-yard run (Jason Elam kick), 14:16. Broncos 7–0. **Drive: 3 plays, 21 yards, 0:58.**
- KC – Marcus Allen 7-yard run (Lin Elliott kick), 6:57. Tied 7–7. **Drive: 8 plays, 45 yards, 3:47.**
- DEN – Anthony Miller 27-yard pass from John Elway (Jason Elam kick), 3:35. Broncos 14–7. **Drive: 7 plays, 60 yards, 2:12.**
- KC – J. J. Birden 6-yard pass from Joe Montana (Lin Elliott kick), 1:12. Tied 14–14. **Drive: 9 plays, 62 yards, 2:23.**

**Third quarter**

- KC – Joe Valerio 4-yard pass from Joe Montana (Lin Elliott kick), 10:02. Chiefs 21–14. **Drive: 10 plays, 76 yards, 4:58.**
- DEN – Jerry Evans 20-yard pass from John Elway (Jason Elam kick), 0:02. Tied 21–21. **Drive: 8 plays, 73 yards, 4:46.**

**Fourth quarter**

- KC – Lin Elliott 19-yard field goal, 4:08. Chiefs 24–21. **Drive: 7 plays, 67 yards, 3:23.**
- DEN – John Elway 4-yard run (Jason Elam kick), 1:29. Broncos 28–24. **Drive: 6 plays, 39 yards, 1:12.**
- KC – Willie Davis 5-yard pass from Joe Montana (Lin Elliott kick), 0:08. Chiefs 31–28. **Drive: 9 plays, 75 yards, 1:21.**

**Top passers**

- KC – Joe Montana – 34/54, 393 yards, 3 TD, INT
- DEN – John Elway – 18/29, 263 yards, 2 TD

**Top rushers**

- KC – Marcus Allen – 16 rushes, 63 yards, TD
- DEN – Leonard Russell – 15 rushes, 41 yards, TD

**Top receivers**

- KC – Derrick Walker – 8 receptions, 98 yards
- DEN – Anthony Miller – 5 receptions, 99 yards, TD

==== Week 8: vs. Seattle Seahawks ====
Week 8: Seattle Seahawks at Kansas City Chiefs – Game summary

| Quarter | 1 | 2 | 3 | 4 | Total |
|---|---|---|---|---|---|
| Seahawks | 0 | 0 | 7 | 16 | **23** |
| **Chiefs** | 0 | 13 | 8 | 17 | **38** |

at Arrowhead Stadium, Kansas City, Missouri

- Date: October 23
- Game time: 12:00 p.m. CDT
- Game weather: Clear, 63 °F (17 °C)
- Game attendance: 78,847
- Referee: Dale Hamer
- TV announcers (NBC): Marv Albert and Paul Maguire
- Recap, Game Book

Game information

**First quarter**

- No scoring plays.

**Second quarter**

- KC – Kimble Anders 9-yard pass from Joe Montana (Lin Elliott kick), 7:48. Chiefs 7–0. **Drive: 10 plays, 82 yards, 5:30.**
- KC – Lin Elliott 49-yard field goal, 6:27. Chiefs 10–0. **Drive: 4 plays, 1 yard, 1:21.**
- KC – Lin Elliott 34-yard field goal, 0:20. Chiefs 13–0. **Drive: 11 plays, 53 yards, 3:20.**

**Third quarter**

- SEA – Jon Vaughn 3-yard run (John Kasay kick), 8:34. Chiefs 13–7. **Drive: 11 plays, 60 yards, 6:26.**
- KC – Marcus Allen 36-yard run (Marcus Allen run), 2:43. Chiefs 21–7. **Drive: 11 plays, 60 yards, 6:26.**

**Fourth quarter**

- KC – Lake Dawson 21-yard pass from Joe Montana (Lin Elliott kick), 14:15. Chiefs 28–7. **Drive: 5 plays, 81 yards, 2:23.**
- KC – Lin Elliott 27-yard field goal, 8:52. Chiefs 31–7. **Drive: 7 plays, 32 yards, 4:08.**
- SEA – Brian Blades 1-yard pass from Rick Mirer (Rick Mirer−Brian Blades pass), 5:50. Chiefs 31–15. **Drive: 7 plays, 65 yards, 3:02.**
- KC – Eric Martin 32-yard pass from Steve Bono (Lin Elliott kick), 4:31. Chiefs 38–15. **Drive: 3 plays, 42 yards, 1:19.**
- SEA – Brian Blades 9-yard pass from Rick Mirer (Jon Vaughn run), 2:12. Chiefs 38–23. **Drive: 13 plays, 71 yards, 2:19.**

**Top passers**

- SEA – Rick Mirer – 15/30, 126 yards, 2 TD
- KC – Joe Montana – 21/31, 270 yards, 2 TD

**Top rushers**

- SEA – Chris Warren – 19 rushes, 117 yards
- KC – Marcus Allen – 14 rushes, 77 yards, TD

**Top receivers**

- SEA – Brian Blades – 7 receptions, 61 yards, 2 TD
- KC – Lake Dawson – 5 receptions, 93 yards, TD

==== Week 9: at Buffalo Bills ====
Week 9: Kansas City Chiefs at Buffalo Bills – Game summary

| Quarter | 1 | 2 | 3 | 4 | Total |
|---|---|---|---|---|---|
| Chiefs | 7 | 0 | 3 | 0 | **10** |
| **Bills** | 14 | 17 | 3 | 10 | **44** |

at Rich Stadium, Orchard Park, New York

- Date: October 30
- Game time: 1:00 p.m. EST/12:00 p.m. CST
- Game weather: Sunny, 60 °F (16 °C)
- Game attendance: 79,501
- Referee: Gordon McCarter
- TV announcers (NBC): Dick Enberg, Bob Trumpy and Hannah Storm
- Recap, Game Book

Game information

**First quarter**

- BUF – Pete Metzelaars 11-yard pass from Jim Kelly (Steve Christie kick), 9:11. Bills 7–0. **Drive: 10 plays, 73 yards, 5:49.**
- KC – Marcus Allen 9-yard run (Lin Elliott kick), 5:28. Tied 7–7. **Drive: 8 plays, 60 yards, 3:43.**
- BUF – Andre Reed 23-yard pass from Jim Kelly (Steve Christie kick), 0:00. Bills 14–7. **Drive: 6 plays, 67 yards, 2:58.**

**Second quarter**

- BUF – Thurman Thomas 2-yard run (Steve Christie kick), 3:16. Bills 21–7. **Drive: 6 plays, 69 yards, 2:16.**
- BUF – Steve Christie 49-yard field goal, 1:00. Bills 24–7. **Drive: 4 plays, 5 yards, 0:53.**
- BUF – Andre Reed 6-yard pass from Jim Kelly (Steve Christie kick), 0:11. Bills 31–7. **Drive: 3 plays, 25 yards, 0:18.**

**Third quarter**

- KC – Lin Elliott 22-yard field goal, 10:34. Bills 31–10. **Drive: 11 plays, 64 yards, 4:26.**
- BUF – Steve Christie 26-yard field goal, 5:45. Bills 34–10. **Drive: 5 plays, 17 yards, 1:33.**

**Fourth quarter**

- BUF – Pete Metzelaars 3-yard pass from Jim Kelly (Steve Christie kick), 14:54. Bills 41–10. **Drive: 3 plays, 12 yards, 1:06.**
- BUF – Steve Christie 24-yard field goal, 9:33. Bills 44–10. **Drive: 6 plays, 73 yards, 2:54.**

**Top passers**

- KC – Joe Montana – 12/20, 124 yards
- BUF – Jim Kelly – 14/22, 184 yards, 4 TD

**Top rushers**

- KC – Greg Hill – 10 rushes, 34 yards
- BUF – Kenneth Davis – 11 rushes, 83 yards

**Top receivers**

- KC – Lake Dawson – 6 receptions, 74 yards
- BUF – Andre Reed – 5 receptions, 106 yards, 2 TD

==== Week 10: vs. Los Angeles Raiders ====
Week 10: Los Angeles Raiders at Kansas City Chiefs – Game summary

| Quarter | 1 | 2 | 3 | 4 | Total |
|---|---|---|---|---|---|
| Raiders | 0 | 3 | 0 | 0 | **3** |
| **Chiefs** | 0 | 7 | 3 | 3 | **13** |

at Arrowhead Stadium, Kansas City, Missouri

- Date: November 6
- Game time: 7:00 p.m. CST
- Game weather: Clear, 58 °F (14 °C)
- Game attendance: 78,709
- Referee: Dick Hantak
- TV announcers (ESPN): Mike Patrick, Joe Theismann and Mark Malone
- Recap, Game Book

Game information

**First quarter**

- No scoring plays.

**Second quarter**

- KC – Derrick Walker 57-yard pass from Joe Montana (Lin Elliott kick), 9:22. Chiefs 7–0. **Drive: 1 play, 62 yards, 0:26.**
- RAI – Jeff Jaeger 50-yard field goal, 5:29. Chiefs 7–3. **Drive: 8 plays, 20 yards, 3:53.**

**Third quarter**

- KC – Lin Elliott 19-yard field goal, 2:46. Chiefs 10–3. **Drive: 11 plays, 64 yards, 5:13.**

**Fourth quarter**

- KC – Lin Elliott 27-yard field goal, 11:33. Chiefs 13–3. **Drive: 14 plays, 58 yards, 5:28.**

**Top passers**

- RAI – Jeff Hostetler – 17/33, 172 yards, 2 INT
- KC – Joe Montana – 17/28, 173 yards, TD

**Top rushers**

- RAI – Harvey Williams – 24 rushes, 93 yards
- KC – Marcus Allen – 15 rushes, 62 yards

**Top receivers**

- RAI – Tim Brown – 6 receptions, 84 yards
- KC – Derrick Brown – 4 receptions, 90 yards, TD

==== Week 11: vs. San Diego Chargers ====
Week 11: San Diego Chargers at Kansas City Chiefs – Game summary

| Quarter | 1 | 2 | 3 | 4 | Total |
|---|---|---|---|---|---|
| **Chargers** | 0 | 0 | 7 | 7 | **14** |
| Chiefs | 0 | 13 | 0 | 0 | **13** |

at Arrowhead Stadium, Kansas City, Missouri

- Date: November 13
- Game time: 12:00 p.m. CST
- Game weather: Overcast with showers, 62 °F (17 °C)
- Game attendance: 76,997
- Referee: Ron Blum
- TV announcers (NBC): Dick Enberg, Bob Trumpy and Hannah Storm
- Recap, Game Book

Game information

**First quarter**

- No scoring plays.

**Second quarter**

- KC – Lin Elliott 27-yard field goal, 12:32. Chiefs 3–0. **Drive: 6 plays, 20 yards, 2:59.**
- KC – Kimble Anders 1-yard run (Lin Elliott kick), 8:51. Chiefs 10–0. **Drive: 4 plays, 28 yards, 1:47.**
- KC – Lin Elliott 34-yard field goal, 0:03. Chiefs 13–0. **Drive: 5 plays, 12 yards, 1:47.**

**Third quarter**

- SD – Shawn Jefferson 52-yard pass from Stan Humphries (John Carney kick), 0:30. Chiefs 13–7. **Drive: 5 plays, 89 yards, 2:38.**

**Fourth quarter**

- SD – Duane Young 5-yard pass from Stan Humphries (John Carney kick), 6:41. Chargers 14–13. **Drive: 3 plays, 8 yards, 1:19.**

**Top passers**

- SD – Stan Humphries – 21/36, 206 yards, 2 TD, INT
- KC – Joe Montana – 20/46, 178 yards, 2 INT

**Top rushers**

- SD – Natrone Means – 21 rushes, 55 yards
- KC – Kimble Anders – 13 rushes, 40 yards, TD

**Top receivers**

- SD – Shawn Jefferson – 2 receptions, 60 yards, TD
- KC – Danan Hughes – 4 receptions, 53 yards

==== Week 12: vs. Cleveland Browns ====
Week 12: Cleveland Browns at Kansas City Chiefs – Game summary

| Quarter | 1 | 2 | 3 | 4 | Total |
|---|---|---|---|---|---|
| Browns | 0 | 6 | 7 | 0 | **13** |
| **Chiefs** | 0 | 7 | 3 | 10 | **20** |

at Arrowhead Stadium, Kansas City, Missouri

- Date: November 20
- Game time: 12:00 p.m. CST
- Game weather: Rain, 48 °F (9 °C)
- Game attendance: 69,121
- Referee: Howard Roe
- TV announcers (NBC): Marv Albert and Paul Maguire
- Recap, Game Book

Game information

**First quarter**

- No scoring plays.

**Second quarter**

- KC – Tracy Greene 6-yard pass from Joe Montana (Lin Elliott kick), 11:09. Chiefs 7–0. **Drive: 10 plays, 59 yards, 4:40.**
- CLE – Eric Metcalf 15-yard pass from Vinny Testaverde (run failed), 2:09. Chiefs 7–6. **Drive: 9 plays, 50 yards, 3:10.**

**Third quarter**

- KC – Lin Elliott 22-yard field goal, 5:18. Chiefs 10–6. **Drive: 7 plays, 15 yards, 2:46.**
- CLE – Michael Jackson 15-yard pass from Mark Rypien (Matt Stover kick), 2:48. Browns 13–10. **Drive: 5 plays, 60 yards, 2:30.**

**Fourth quarter**

- KC – Lin Elliott 28-yard field goal, 14:07. Tied 13–13. **Drive: 9 plays, 69 yards, 3:41.**
- KC – Kimble Anders 1-yard run (Lin Elliott kick), 7:46. Chiefs 20–13. **Drive: 8 plays, 61 yards, 4:11.**

**Top passers**

- CLE – Mark Rypien – 10/24, 114 yards, TD, INT
- KC – Joe Montana – 19/33, 169 yards, TD

**Top rushers**

- CLE – Leroy Hoard – 17 rushes, 68 yards
- KC – Greg Hill – 12 rushes, 66 yards

**Top receivers**

- CLE – Leroy Hoard – 6 receptions, 56 yards
- KC – Eric Martin – 4 receptions, 54 yards

==== Week 13: at Seattle Seahawks ====
Week 13: Kansas City Chiefs at Seattle Seahawks – Game summary

| Quarter | 1 | 2 | 3 | 4 | Total |
|---|---|---|---|---|---|
| Chiefs | 3 | 3 | 0 | 3 | **9** |
| **Seahawks** | 0 | 0 | 0 | 10 | **10** |

at Kingdome, Seattle, Washington

- Date: November 27
- Game time: 3:00 p.m. CST/1:00 p.m. PST
- Game weather: None (indoor stadium)
- Game attendance: 54,120
- Referee: Ed Hochuli
- TV announcers (NBC): Tom Hammond and Cris Collinsworth
- Recap, Game Book

Game information

**First quarter**

- KC – Lin Elliott 32-yard field goal, 7:06. Chiefs 3–0. **Drive: 13 plays, 56 yards, 6:14.**

**Second quarter**

- KC – Lin Elliott 23-yard field goal, 8:43. Chiefs 6–0. **Drive: 7 plays, 34 yards, 3:02.**

**Third quarter**

- No scoring plays.

**Fourth quarter**

- SEA – Steve Smith 2-yard run (John Kasay kick), 13:02. Seahawks 7–6. **Drive: 10 plays, 66 yards, 5:02.**
- KC – Lin Elliott 38-yard field goal, 7:27. Chiefs 9–7. **Drive: 11 plays, 52 yards, 5:35.**
- SEA – John Kasay 32-yard field goal, 1:42. Seahawks 10–9. **Drive: 5 plays, 25 yards, 1:15.**

**Top passers**

- KC – Joe Montana – 19/35, 163 yards
- SEA – Rick Mirer – 15/31, 195 yards

**Top rushers**

- KC – Donnell Bennett – 8 rushes, 42 yards
- SEA – Chris Warren – 22 rushes, 53 yards

**Top receivers**

- KC – Lake Dawson – 8 receptions, 66 yards
- SEA – Brian Blades – 7 receptions, 141 yards

==== Week 14: vs. Denver Broncos ====
Week 14: Denver Broncos at Kansas City Chiefs – Game summary

| Quarter | 1 | 2 | 3 | 4 | OT | Total |
|---|---|---|---|---|---|---|
| **Broncos** | 7 | 0 | 7 | 3 | 3 | **20** |
| Chiefs | 0 | 3 | 6 | 8 | 0 | **17** |

at Arrowhead Stadium, Kansas City, Missouri

- Date: December 4
- Game time: 3:00 p.m. CST
- Game weather: Overcast, 67 °F (19 °C)
- Game attendance: 77,631
- Referee: Tom White
- TV announcers (NBC): Dick Enberg, Bob Trumpy and Beasley Reece
- Recap, Game Book

Game information

**First quarter**

- DEN – Reggie Rivers 1-yard run (Jason Elam kick), 7:06. Broncos 7–0. **Drive: 8 plays, 61 yards, 4:22.**

**Second quarter**

- KC – Lin Elliott 22-yard field goal, 5:01. Broncos 7–3. **Drive: 7 plays, 7 yards, 2:51.**

**Third quarter**

- DEN – Shannon Sharpe 24-yard pass from John Elway (Jason Elam kick), 5:33. Broncos 14–3. **Drive: 6 plays, 88 yards, 3:00.**
- KC – Marcus Allen 1-yard run (run failed), 3:14. Broncos 14–9. **Drive: 4 plays, 76 yards, 2:19.**

**Fourth quarter**

- DEN – Jason Elam 34-yard field goal, 7:26. Broncos 17–9. **Drive: 18 plays, 65 yards, 10:48.**
- KC – Willie Davis 62-yard pass from Steve Bono (Steve Bono–Willie Davis pass), 7:08. Tied 17–17. **Drive: 1 play, 62 yards, 0:18.**

**Overtime**

- DEN – Jason Elam 34-yard field goal, 2:48. Broncos 20–17. **Drive: 9 plays, 41 yards, 4:52.**

**Top passers**

- DEN – John Elway – 18/22, 256 yards, TD
- KC – Steve Bono – 18/37, 323 yards, TD

**Top rushers**

- DEN – Leonard Russell – 20 rushes, 62 yards
- KC – Marcus Allen – 16 rushes, 49 yards, TD

**Top receivers**

- DEN – Anthony Miller – 6 receptions, 153 yards
- KC – Willie Davis – 3 receptions, 107 yards, TD

==== Week 15: at Miami Dolphins ====
Week 15: Kansas City Chiefs at Miami Dolphins – Game summary

| Quarter | 1 | 2 | 3 | 4 | Total |
|---|---|---|---|---|---|
| Chiefs | 7 | 7 | 7 | 7 | **28** |
| **Dolphins** | 0 | 14 | 21 | 10 | **45** |

at Joe Robbie Stadium, Miami, Florida

- Date: December 12
- Game time: 9:00 p.m. EST/8:00 p.m. CST
- Game weather: Partly cloudy, 74 °F (23 °C)
- Game attendance: 71,578
- Referee: Bernie Kukar
- TV announcers (ABC): Al Michaels, Frank Gifford, Dan Dierdorf and Lynn Swann
- Recap, Game Book

Game information

**First quarter**

- KC – J. J. Birden 22-yard pass from Steve Bono (Lin Elliott kick), 5:36. Chiefs 7–0. **Drive: 10 plays, 83 yards, 7:16.**

**Second quarter**

- MIA – Bernie Parmalee 10-yard pass from Dan Marino (Pete Stoyanovich kick), 14:54. Tied 7–7. **Drive: 12 plays, 75 yards, 5:42.**
- KC – Marcus Allen 3-yard run (Lin Elliott kick), 9:05. Chiefs 14–7. **Drive: 13 plays, 81 yards, 5:49.**
- MIA – Irving Fryar 4-yard pass from Dan Marino (Pete Stoyanovich kick), 3:19. Tied 14–14. **Drive: 10 plays, 81 yards, 5:46.**

**Third quarter**

- MIA – Dan Marino 4-yard run (Pete Stoyanovich kick), 5:57. Dolphins 21–14. **Drive: 13 plays, 61 yards, 7:20.**
- MIA – Troy Vincent 58-yard interception return (Pete Stoyanovich kick), 3:56. Dolphins 28–14.
- KC – Jon Vaughn 91-yard kickoff return (Lin Elliott kick), 3:39. Dolphins 28–21.
- MIA – Bernie Parmalee 47-yard run (Pete Stoyanovich kick), 0:36. Dolphins 35–21. **Drive: 5 plays, 75 yards, 3:03.**

**Fourth quarter**

- MIA – Pete Stoyanovich 21-yard field goal, 7:27. Dolphins 38–21. **Drive: 11 plays, 70 yards, 6:04.**
- KC – Willie Davis 15-yard pass from Steve Bono (Lin Elliott kick), 3:26. Dolphins 38–28. **Drive: 14 plays, 66 yards, 4:01.**
- MIA – Irving Spikes 1-yard run (Pete Stoyanovich kick), 3:08. Dolphins 45–28. **Drive: 1 play, 1 yard, 0:18.**

**Top passers**

- KC – Steve Bono – 33/55, 314 yards, 2 TD, 3 INT
- MIA – Dan Marino – 21/30, 241 yards, 2 TD

**Top rushers**

- KC – Kimble Anders – 3 rushes, 22 yards
- MIA – Bernie Parmalee – 19 rushes, 127 yards, TD

**Top receivers**

- KC – J. J. Birden – 10 receptions, 131 yards, TD
- MIA – O. J. McDuffie – 5 receptions, 66 yards

==== Week 16: vs. Houston Oilers ====
Week 16: Houston Oilers at Kansas City Chiefs – Game summary

| Quarter | 1 | 2 | 3 | 4 | Total |
|---|---|---|---|---|---|
| Oilers | 3 | 0 | 0 | 6 | **9** |
| **Chiefs** | 7 | 0 | 14 | 10 | **31** |

at Arrowhead Stadium, Kansas City, Missouri

- Date: December 18
- Game time: 3:00 p.m. CST
- Game weather: Clear, 51 °F (11 °C)
- Game attendance: 74,474
- Referee: Gerry Austin
- TV announcers (NBC): Don Criqui and Beasley Reece
- Recap, Game Book

Game information

**First quarter**

- KC – Derrick Walker 10-yard pass from Joe Montana (Lin Elliott kick), 10:26. Chiefs 7–0. **Drive: 5 plays, 29 yards, 2:21.**
- HOU – Al Del Greco 48-yard field goal, 2:29. Chiefs 7–3. **Drive: 8 plays, 43 yards, 4:03.**

**Second quarter**

- No scoring plays.

**Third quarter**

- KC – Lake Dawson 25-yard pass from Joe Montana (Lin Elliott kick), 11:38. Chiefs 14–3. **Drive: 7 plays, 76 yards, 3:22.**
- KC – Donnell Bennett 12-yard run (Lin Elliott kick), 4:24. Chiefs 21–3. **Drive: 6 plays, 82 yards, 3:31.**

**Fourth quarter**

- HOU – Haywood Jeffires 20-yard pass from Billy Joe Tolliver (pass failed), 14:55. Chiefs 21–9. **Drive: 10 plays, 74 yards, 4:29.**
- KC – Lin Elliott 21-yard field goal, 12:53. Chiefs 24–9. **Drive: 6 plays, 59 yards, 2:02.**
- KC – Greg Hill 8-yard run (Lin Elliott kick), 4:10. Chiefs 31–9. **Drive: 1 plays, 8 yards, 0:05.**

**Top passers**

- HOU – Billy Joe Tolliver – 15/26, 116 yards, TD, INT
- KC – Joe Montana – 16/27, 235 yards, 2 TD

**Top rushers**

- HOU – Lorenzo White – 21 rushes, 88 yards
- KC – Greg Hill – 14 rushes, 63 yards, TD

**Top receivers**

- HOU – Haywood Jeffires – 4 receptions, 57 yards, TD
- KC – Lake Dawson – 5 receptions, 101 yards, TD

==== Week 17: at Los Angeles Raiders ====
Week 17: Kansas City Chiefs at Los Angeles Raiders – Game summary

| Quarter | 1 | 2 | 3 | 4 | Total |
|---|---|---|---|---|---|
| **Chiefs** | 7 | 7 | 3 | 2 | **19** |
| Raiders | 0 | 3 | 0 | 6 | **9** |

at Los Angeles Memorial Coliseum, Los Angeles, California

- Date: December 24
- Game time: 3:00 p.m. CST/1:00 p.m. PST
- Game weather: Cloudy, 65 °F (18 °C)
- Game attendance: 64,130
- Referee: Red Cashion
- TV announcers (NBC): Dick Enberg, Bob Trumpy and Jim Gray
- Recap, Game Book

Game information

**First quarter**

- KC – Willie Davis 47-yard pass from Joe Montana (Lin Elliott kick), 13:06. Chiefs 7–0. **Drive: 5 plays, 77 yards, 1:54.**

**Second quarter**

- RAI – Jeff Jaeger 30-yard field goal, 7:02. Chiefs 7–3. **Drive: 22 plays, 86 yards, 12:14.**
- KC – Mark Collins 78-yard interception return (Lin Elliott kick), 0:00. Chiefs 14–3.

**Third quarter**

- KC – Lin Elliott 22-yard field goal, 5:03. Chiefs 17–3. **Drive: 13 plays, 71 yards, 6:25.**

**Fourth quarter**

- KC – Penalty on Don Mosebar enforced in end zone for a Safety, 11:57. Chiefs 19–3.
- RAI – Alexander Wright 65-yard pass from Vince Evans (pass failed), 6:21. Chiefs 19–9. **Drive: 5 plays, 97 yards, 1:51.**

**Top passers**

- KC – Joe Montana – 15/24, 214 yards, TD
- RAI – Jeff Hostetler – 14/27, 167 yards, INT

**Top rushers**

- KC – Marcus Allen – 33 rushes, 132 yards
- RAI – Harvey Williams – 14 rushes, 48 yards

**Top receivers**

- KC – Willie Davis – 3 receptions, 83 yards, TD
- RAI – Tim Brown – 6 receptions, 85 yards

=== Standings ===
AFC West
| | W | L | T | PCT | PF | PA | STK |
|---|---|---|---|---|---|---|---|
| ^{(2)} San Diego Chargers | 11 | 5 | 0 | .688 | 381 | 306 | W2 |
| ^{(6)} Kansas City Chiefs | 9 | 7 | 0 | .563 | 319 | 298 | W2 |
| Los Angeles Raiders | 9 | 7 | 0 | .563 | 303 | 327 | L1 |
| Denver Broncos | 7 | 9 | 0 | .438 | 347 | 396 | L3 |
| Seattle Seahawks | 6 | 10 | 0 | .375 | 287 | 323 | L2 |

- Kansas City finished ahead of the Los Angeles Raiders based on head-to-head sweep (2–0)

== Postseason ==
=== Schedule ===
| Round | Date | Opponent (seed) | Result | Record | Venue | Attendance | Recap |
|---|---|---|---|---|---|---|---|
| Wild Card | December 31 | at Miami Dolphins (3) | L 17–27 | 0–1 | Joe Robbie Stadium | 67,487 | Recap |

=== Game summaries ===
==== AFC Wild Card Playoffs: at (3) Miami Dolphins ====
AFC Wild Card Playoffs: Kansas City Chiefs (6) at Miami Dolphins (3) – Game summary

| Quarter | 1 | 2 | 3 | 4 | Total |
|---|---|---|---|---|---|
| Chiefs | 14 | 3 | 0 | 0 | 17 |
| Dolphins | 7 | 10 | 10 | 0 | 27 |

at Joe Robbie Stadium, Miami, Florida

- Date: December 31
- Game time: 4:00 p.m. EST/3:00 p.m. CST
- Game weather: Partly cloudy, 79 °F (26 °C)
- Game attendance: 67,487
- Referee: Jerry Markbreit
- TV announcers (ABC): Al Michaels, Frank Gifford, Dan Dierdorf and Lynn Swann
- Recap, Game Book

Game information

First quarter

- KC – Derrick Walker 1-yard pass from Joe Montana (Lin Elliott kick), 8:22. Chiefs 7–0. Drive: 11 plays, 80 yards, 6:28.
- MIA – Bernie Parmalee 1-yard run (Pete Stoyanovich kick), 2:20. Tied 7–7. Drive: 10 plays, 72 yards, 6:12.
- KC – Kimble Anders 57-yard pass from Joe Montana (Lin Elliott kick), 0:40. Chiefs 14–7. Drive: 4 plays, 83 yards, 1:40.

Second quarter

- MIA – Pete Stoyanovich 40-yard field goal, 12:15. Chiefs 14–10. Drive: 7 plays, 35 yards, 3:25.
- KC – Lin Elliott 21-yard field goal, 6:12. Chiefs 17–10. Drive: 12 plays, 69 yards, 6:03.
- MIA – Ronnie Williams 1-yard pass from Dan Marino (Pete Stoyanovich kick), 0:22. Tied 17–17. Drive: 13 plays, 80 yards, 5:50.

Third quarter

- MIA – Irving Fryar 7-yard pass from Dan Marino (Pete Stoyanovich kick), 11:58. Dolphins 24–17. Drive: 6 plays, 64 yards, 3:02.
- MIA – Pete Stoyanovich 40-yard field goal, 1:36. Dolphins 27–17. Drive: 10 plays, 59 yards, 4:48.

Fourth quarter

- No scoring plays.

Top passers

- KC – Joe Montana – 26/37, 314 yards, 2 TD, INT
- MIA – Dan Marino – 22/29, 257 yards, 2 TD

Top rushers

- KC – Marcus Allen – 14 rushes, 64 yards
- MIA – Bernie Parmalee – 18 rushes, 57 yards, TD

Top receivers

- KC – Kimble Anders – 6 receptions, 103 yards, TD
- MIA – Irving Fryar – 6 receptions, 71 yards, TD
