= Tamposi =

Tamposi is a surname. Notable people with the surname include:

- Ali Tamposi (born 1989), American songwriter
- Elizabeth M. Tamposi (born 1955), American politician and diplomat
- Samuel A. Tamposi (1924–1995), American real estate developer
