= Michael Joseph (American politician) =

American politician

Member-elect of the New Hampshire House of Representatives from the Hillsborough 3rd district
- Assuming office December 2026
- Succeeding: Paige Beauchemin

Personal details
- Party: Democratic

Michael Joseph is an American politician. A member of the Democratic Party, he is the member-elect for the Hillsborough 3rd district of the New Hampshire House of Representatives.
