= Kissy Simmons =

American actress

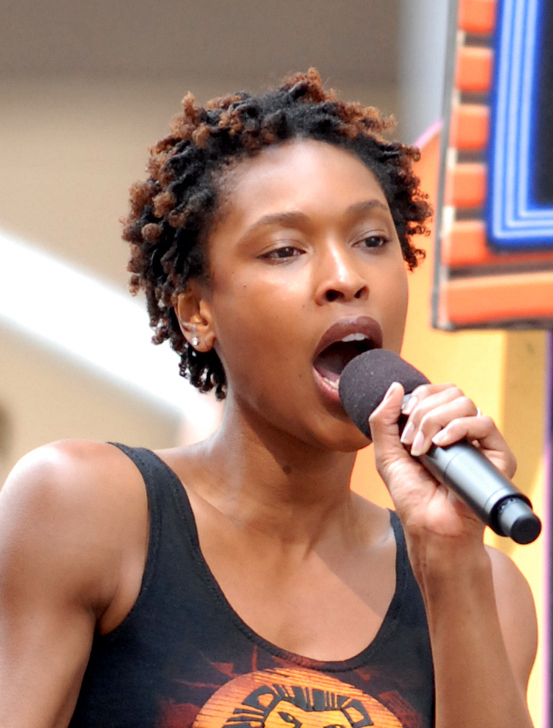
Simmons performing "Shadowland" at Broadway on Broadway, September 10, 2006.

Kissy Simmons is an American actress. "Kissy" is short for Kissimmee, the Floridian city near Orlando about 80 miles from Floral City where she was born. She is best known for playing Nala in the Broadway production of The Lion King and as of 2011 is reprising the role in the Las Vegas production at Mandalay Bay beginning May 5, 2009.

== Biography ==
Simmons was state high-jump champion at Citrus High School in Florida, and attended the University of South Florida on a full track scholarship. She received a BA in speech communications before going on to a successful modeling and theatre career in the Tampa Bay area. Professional credits include Joseph and the Amazing Technicolor Dreamcoat (Narrator), Little Shop of Horrors (Ronnette) and Jacques Brel is Alive and Well and Living in Paris.

== Recent career ==
In April 2008, Simmons made her Carnegie Hall debut performing at the New York Pops 25th Annual Spring Gala. Then in May 2008, along with Ashley Brown and Sierra Boggess, she performed at The New York Pops 25th Birthday Gala.

Along with ten other select members of the current Lion King cast, Simmons performed September 15, 2008 at The White House for a State Dinner. The invitation came personally from The First Lady Laura Bush, who saw the show during its Kennedy Center engagement.
