= Inverness Highlands North, Florida =

Census-designated place in Florida, US

Inverness Highlands North
- Census-designated place
- Location in Citrus County and the state of Florida
- Coordinates: 28°52′15″N 82°22′35″W
- Country: United States
- State: Florida
- County: Citrus

Area
  - Total: 2.07 sq mi (5.35 km^{2})
  - Land: 2.01 sq mi (5.20 km^{2})
  - Water: 0.062 sq mi (0.16 km^{2})
- Elevation: 72 ft (22 m)

Population (2020)
  - Total: 2,707
  - Density: 1,349/sq mi (520.9/km^{2})
- Time zone: UTC-5 (Eastern (EST))
  - Summer (DST): UTC-4 (EDT)
- FIPS code: 12-33958
- GNIS feature ID: 2402617

Inverness Highlands North is an unincorporated area and census-designated place (CDP) in Citrus County, Florida, United States. The population was 2,707 at the 2020 census, up from 2,401 at the 2010 census. It is part of the Homosassa Springs, Florida Metropolitan Statistical Area.

== Geography ==
Inverness Highlands North is located in eastern Citrus County up against the northwest corner of the city of Inverness, the county seat. The CDP is bordered to the north by Hernando and to the northwest by Citrus Hills. State Road 44 forms the southern edge of the CDP, leading east into Inverness and west 14 miles (23 km) to Crystal River.

According to the United States Census Bureau, the CDP has a total area of 1.9 square miles (5.0 km^{2}), of which 1.9 square miles (4.9 km^{2}) is land and 0.08 square miles (0.2 km^{2}), or 3.11%, is water.

== Demographics ==
Historical population
| Census | Pop. | Note | %± |
|---|---|---|---|
| 2000 | 1,470 | | — |
| 2010 | 2,401 | | 63.3% |
| 2020 | 2,707 | | 12.7% |
U.S. Decennial Census

=== 2020 census ===
As of the 2020 census, Inverness Highlands North had a population of 2,707. The median age was 46.4 years. 19.4% of residents were under the age of 18 and 23.7% of residents were 65 years of age or older. For every 100 females there were 93.6 males, and for every 100 females age 18 and over there were 89.3 males age 18 and over.

100.0% of residents lived in urban areas, while 0.0% lived in rural areas.

There were 1,146 households in Inverness Highlands North, of which 27.1% had children under the age of 18 living in them. Of all households, 44.0% were married-couple households, 18.2% were households with a male householder and no spouse or partner present, and 28.1% were households with a female householder and no spouse or partner present. About 28.4% of all households were made up of individuals and 16.6% had someone living alone who was 65 years of age or older.

There were 1,224 housing units, of which 6.4% were vacant. The homeowner vacancy rate was 1.1% and the rental vacancy rate was 1.9%.

Racial composition as of the 2020 census
| Race | Number | Percent |
|---|---|---|
| White | 2,269 | 83.8% |
| Black or African American | 120 | 4.4% |
| American Indian and Alaska Native | 16 | 0.6% |
| Asian | 48 | 1.8% |
| Native Hawaiian and Other Pacific Islander | 2 | 0.1% |
| Some other race | 36 | 1.3% |
| Two or more races | 216 | 8.0% |
| Hispanic or Latino (of any race) | 212 | 7.8% |

=== 2000 census ===
As of the census of 2000, there were 1,470 people, 616 households, and 434 families residing in the CDP. The population density was 766.8 inhabitants per square mile (296.1/km^{2}). There were 665 housing units at an average density of 346.9 per square mile (133.9/km^{2}). The racial makeup of the CDP was 91.77% White, 6.05% African American, 0.07% Native American, 0.27% Asian, 0.14% from other races, and 1.70% from two or more races. Hispanic or Latino of any race were 2.59% of the population.

There were 616 households, out of which 26.8% had children under the age of 18 living with them, 57.1% were married couples living together, 9.7% had a female householder with no husband present, and 29.5% were non-families. 25.2% of all households were made up of individuals, and 12.5% had someone living alone who was 65 years of age or older. The average household size was 2.39 and the average family size was 2.80.

In the CDP, the population was spread out, with 22.4% under the age of 18, 6.7% from 18 to 24, 24.3% from 25 to 44, 23.0% from 45 to 64, and 23.6% who were 65 years of age or older. The median age was 42 years. For every 100 females, there were 89.2 males. For every 100 females age 18 and over, there were 83.0 males.

The median income for a household in the CDP was $27,128, and the median income for a family was $28,821. Males had a median income of $30,263 versus $21,161 for females. The per capita income for the CDP was $12,818. About 13.1% of families and 14.0% of the population were below the poverty line, including 13.0% of those under age 18 and 12.4% of those age 65 or over.

== Public transportation ==
Citrus County Transit's Orange route serves Inverness.

== Education ==
The CDP is served by Citrus County Schools. Elementary schools serving sections of the CDP include Hernando and Pleasant Grove. All residents are zoned to Inverness Middle School, and Citrus High School.
