= Samuel A. Tamposi =

American real estate developer (1924–1995)

- Born: August 31, 1924; Nashua, New Hampshire, U.S.
- Died: May 25, 1995 (aged 70); Boston, Massachusetts, U.S.
- Occupations: Businessman, entrepreneur
- Political party: Republican
- Children: 6, including Elizabeth Tamposi
- Relatives: Ali Tamposi and Maggie Goodlander (granddaughters)

Samuel A. Tamposi (August 31, 1924 – May 25, 1995) was an American real estate developer and Republican Party activist from New Hampshire. He is best known for his work in the Nashua, New Hampshire and Citrus Hills, Florida areas, and for his friendship with Ted Williams, and association with the Boston Red Sox.

Tamposi played an integral role in bringing many Fortune 500 companies to New Hampshire, such as Fidelity Investments, Anheuser Busch, Coca-Cola, Raytheon, Sylvania, Sun Chemical, Kollsman Instruments and Honeywell.

== Biography ==
Samuel Tamposi was born in Nashua, New Hampshire in 1924 to George and Aspasia Tamposi, Aromanian parents who came to the United States from Avdella, Greece. He had two older brothers, Nicholas (Nick) and James (Jim). Though Tamposi grew up on a farm, his interests soon shifted to sales.

In the mid 1950s, when Nashua's Textron plant shut down, Tamposi moved his business to real estate, investing most of his money in an abandoned building. He later sold the building and used the capital to develop a building for McCallister Scientific.

Tamposi met Gerald Nash after this first development, and the two formed a fast partnership. Throughout the 1960s and 1970s, Tamposi and Nash developed more than 120 acres (0.49 km^{2}) of commercial and industrial land per year.

== Development of Citrus Hills ==
In 1977, Tamposi was invited to become a limited partner in ownership of the Boston Red Sox. Through this association, Tamposi became friends with Ted Williams. Williams soon became a spokesperson for Tamposi and Nash's new planned Floridian community, Citrus Hills.

== Personal life ==
One of his granddaughters, Maggie Goodlander, is an attorney who was U.S. deputy assistant attorney general for the Antitrust Division from 2022 to 2024. In November 2024 she won election to Congress as the Representative for New Hampshire's 2nd congressional district, and has served in that position since January 2025. Her husband is Jake Sullivan.

Another granddaughter, Ali Tamposi is an accomplished singer-songwriter, having written or co-written hits such as "Stronger (What Doesn't Kill You)", "Señorita", "It Ain't Me", "Idol", among others.
