= Sam Franklin Jr. =

American football player (born 1996)

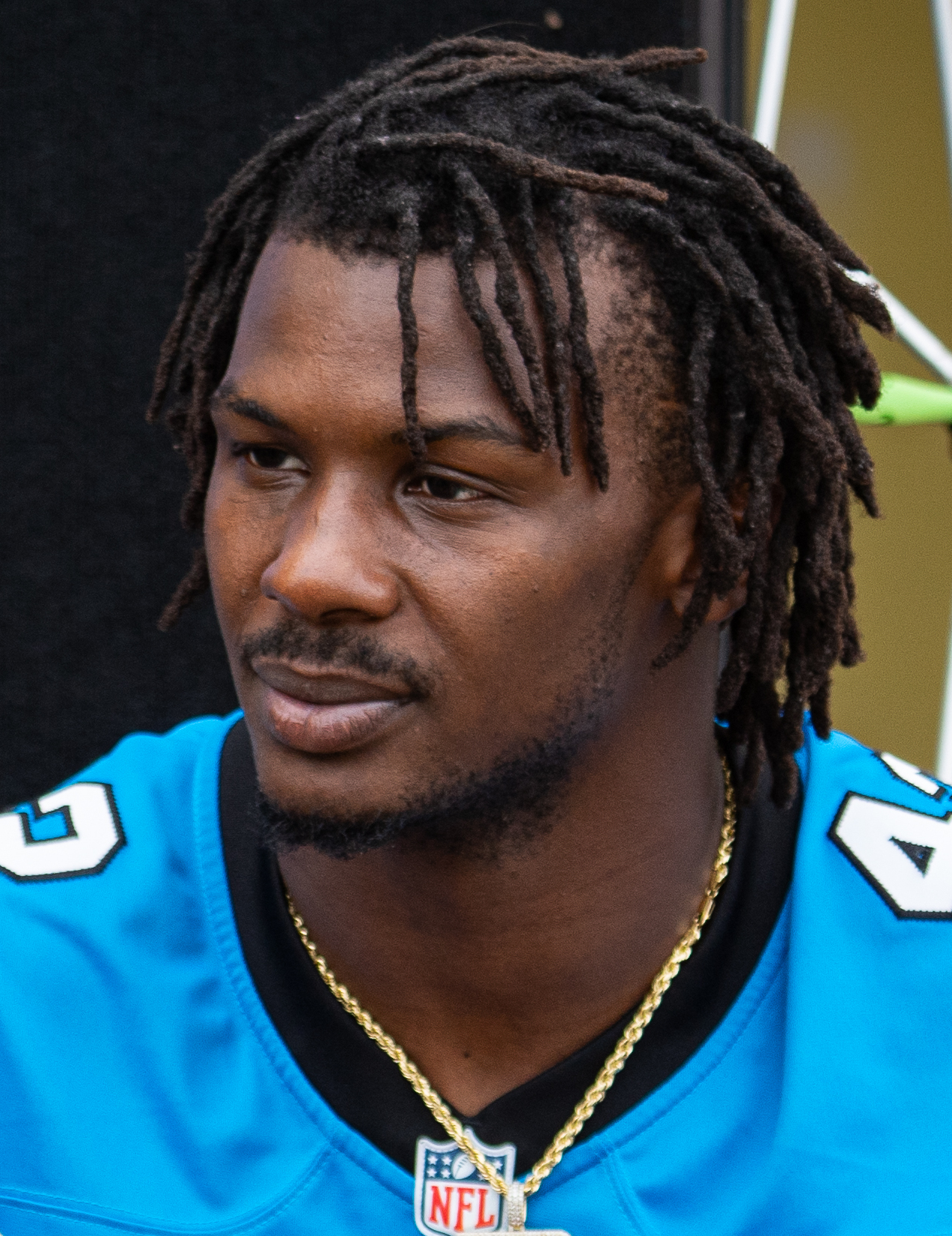
- Franklin with the Carolina Panthers in 2024

No. 28 – Buffalo Bills
- Position: Safety
- Roster status: Active

Personal information
- Born: February 2, 1996 (age 30); Inverness, Florida, U.S.
- Listed height: 6 ft 3 in (1.91 m)
- Listed weight: 210 lb (95 kg)

Career information
- High school: Citrus (Inverness)
- College: Temple (2016–2019)
- NFL draft: 2020: undrafted

Career history
- Carolina Panthers (2020–2024); Denver Broncos (2025)*; Buffalo Bills (2025–present)
- * Offseason or practice squad member only

Career NFL statistics as of Week 11, 2026
- Total tackles: 128
- Sacks: 1
- Forced fumbles: 1
- Pass deflections: 5
- Interceptions: 1
- Defensive touchdowns: 1
- Stats at Pro Football Reference

Samuel Lamar Franklin Jr. (born February 2, 1996) is an American professional football safety for the Buffalo Bills of the National Football League (NFL). He played college football for the Temple Owls and was signed by the Carolina Panthers as an undrafted free agent in 2020.

== Early life ==
Franklin grew up in Crystal River, Florida and attended Citrus High School, where he played wide receiver, safety and linebacker on the football team. He was recruited by the University of Massachusetts, but failed to qualify academically. He enrolled at East Coast Prep, where he played alongside future Panthers teammate Myles Hartsfield for a post-graduate year to improve his grades and test scores.

== College career ==
Franklin was a member of the Temple Owls for four seasons, starting as a defensive back before moving to linebacker. As a senior, he was the team's third-leading tackler with 68 tackles and had 7.5 tackles for loss. Franklin finished his collegiate career with 194 tackles including 24 tackles for loss, eight sacks, two interceptions, 10 pass breakups, three fumble recoveries and one forced fumble in 53 games played.

== Professional career ==
Pre-draft measurables
Height	Weight	Arm length	Hand span	Wingspan
6 ft 2 1/8 in (1.88 m)	204 lb (93 kg)	31 3/4 in (0.81 m)	9 1/2 in (0.24 m)	6 ft 7 1/8 in (2.01 m)
All values from Pro Day

=== Carolina Panthers ===
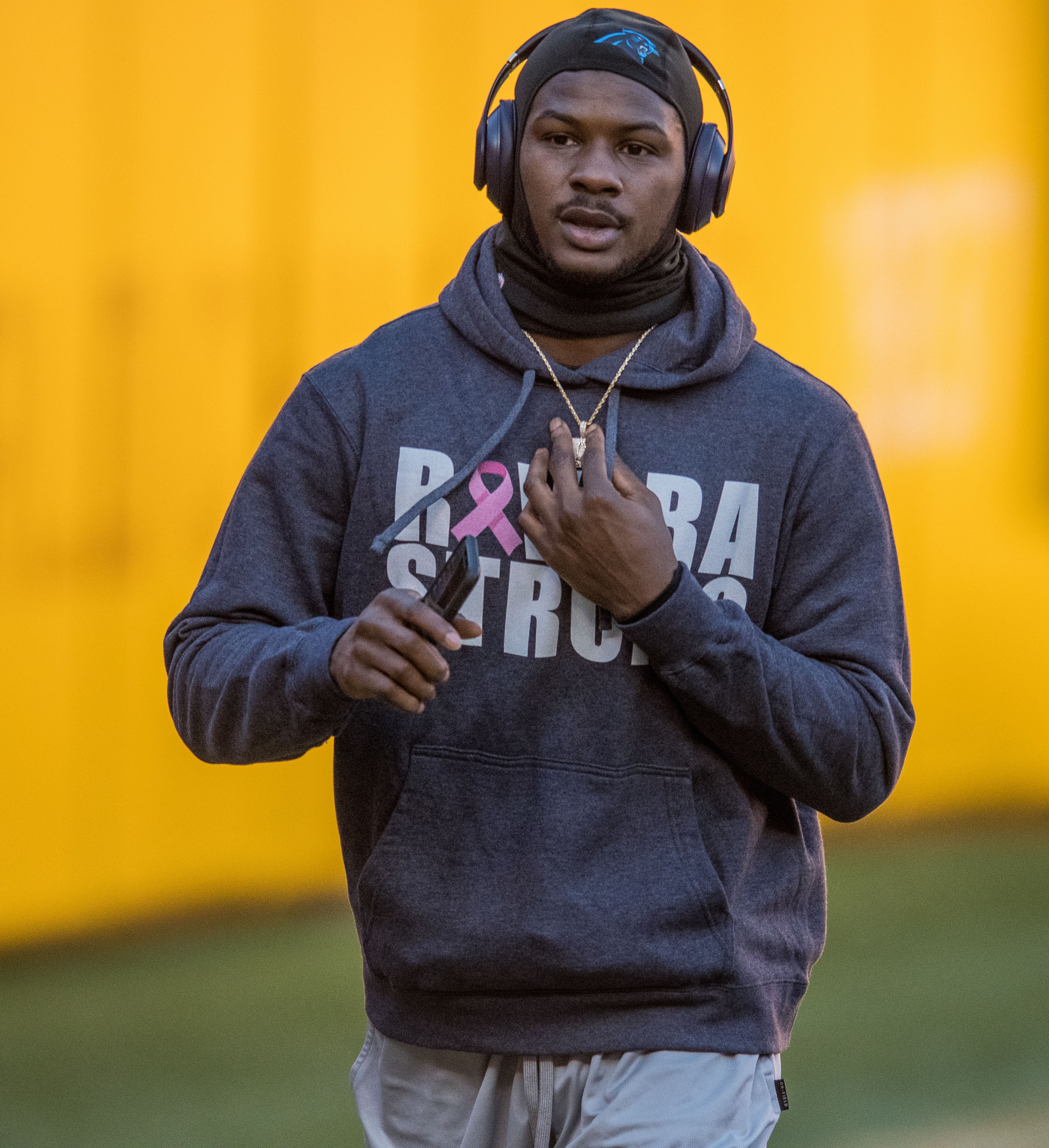
Franklin with the Carolina Panthers in 2020

Franklin was signed by the Carolina Panthers as an undrafted free agent on May 2, 2020, and made the team out of training camp. On October 18, Franklin had his first meaningful action against the Chicago Bears when Juston Burris was injured, making two tackles. In Week 9 against the Kansas City Chiefs, Franklin recorded his first career sack on Patrick Mahomes during the 33–31 loss.

In Week 4 of the 2023 season against the Minnesota Vikings, Franklin recorded his first career interception which he then returned 99 yards for his first NFL defensive touchdown. This interception also set the franchise record for longest interception returned for a touchdown. One week later at Detroit, Franklin set a new personal high with eight total tackles, including seven solo stops.

On July 29, 2024, Franklin suffered a broken foot during training camp practice. He was placed on injured reserve to begin the season. He was activated on October 26.

=== Denver Broncos ===
On April 8, 2025, Franklin signed a one-year guaranteed contract with the Denver Broncos. On August 26, Franklin was released by the Broncos.

=== Buffalo Bills ===
On August 27, 2025, Franklin signed with the Buffalo Bills' practice squad. On September 4, he was promoted to the active roster.

On February 27, 2026, Franklin signed a three-year contract extension with the Bills worth up to $7.5 million.

On October 21, 2026, Franklin was suspended by the NFL for one game for spitting at a Raiders opponent three days after a Week 6 win over the Las Vegas Raiders. He was the second Bills' player to be suspended for spitting at an opponent in that game, after C. J. Gardner-Johnson was disqualified for spitting earlier in the game. Franklin denied the allegation, and announced that he would appeal the suspension. On October 23, the NFL announced that Franklin’s suspension was reduced to a unsportsmanlike conduct fine following his successful appeal.
