= Citrus High School =

Public high school in Inverness, Florida, United States

Coordinates: 28.8352619°N 82.3370383°W

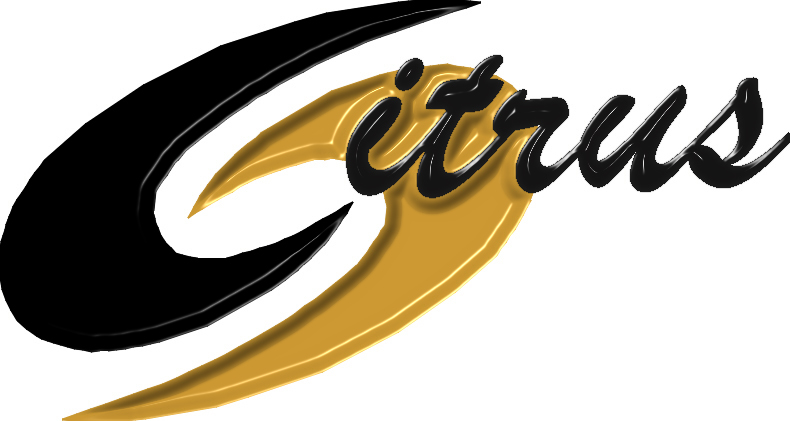

Location
- 600 W. Highland Blvd. Inverness, Florida 34452; United States

Information
- Type: Public Secondary School
- Established: 1911
- School district: Citrus County School District
- Principal: Mary Leonard
- Teaching staff: 80.50 (FTE)
- Grades: 9 to 12
- Enrollment: 1,486 (2023–2024)
- Student to teacher ratio: 18.46
- Schedule type: 7 periods
- Colors: Black and Vegas gold
- Song: Citrus High We Love Thee
- Mascot: Hurricane
- Yearbook: The Citrio
- Feeder schools: Inverness Middle School, Citrus Springs Middle School
- Website: http://chs.citrusschools.org

Citrus High School (CHS) is a public high school in the town of Inverness, Florida, United States. A part of the Citrus County School District, Citrus High currently offers a four-year curriculum in grades 9-12 and currently has an enrollment of 1,420 students. The school was founded in 1911. Citrus High, nicknamed the Hurricanes, was the first of the three high schools in the Citrus County School District, which also includes Crystal River High, in the coastal town of Crystal River and Lecanto High, located in the center of the county.

In the 2016–17 school year, Citrus High School started the Academy of Computer Sciences, an academy designed to give students a strong foundation in computer science.

Citrus High serves the following communities: Inverness, Floral City, Inverness Highlands North, Inverness Highlands South, and sections of Citrus Hills, Citrus Springs, and Hernando.

== History ==
Citrus High School can be dated to the late 1800s when it was a wood-frame school building that taught chart class to the sixth grade. It is referred to as the first Inverness High School by some. Citrus High School was officially authorized to be built in 1911 as a two-story brick school house which was designed by architect W.B. Talley. It was to be built on Citrus Avenue. This was across the street from the existing building. The Winston Brothers of Inverness, Florida's bid of $12,760 was approved by the school board. It was built originally to serve high school students, however, after the construction was completed, the school taught grades 1-12.

In 1913, the school was wired for electricity and in 1918, the student body had outgrown the school. The school board originally wished to add on to the school but, after two unsuccessful attempts for bid, the project was abandoned. In 1920, the Board of Public Instruction approved to build a school and principal's home. The newer school was to be built on the corner of Line Avenue and Main Street. The bid was given to C.M. Emerson & Co. for a bid of $19,210. The current old school was to be strictly used as a grammar school. In 1921, the new school was built but was only used for a short time. Due to major structural problems, the students were sent back to the 1911 school. In 1930, a new high school was built once again on Main Street and Line Avenue. Citrus High received accreditation as a four-year high school from the State Board of Education. This school housed students until 1985 when a fire struck Citrus High School which nearly burned down the whole campus. The fire was blamed on faulty wiring. Students were placed in temporary portables to finish the school year. Some classes were held in the original 1911 building which is currently owned by Citrus Memorial Hospital. After the fire, Citrus High School was steadily reconstructed until 1992 when construction on the new East and West Wings were completed. The original building from the 1930 school resides between these wings.

== Notable alumni ==
- Ben Davison – Olympic Rower
- Sam Franklin – NFL strong safety for the Buffalo Bills; recorded his first career sack on Patrick Mahomes
- Monty Grow – NFL player
- Rick Hamilton – UCF Athletics Hall of Fame; football, NFL player
- Kissy Simmons – actress, Class of 1993
