= Paige Beauchemin =

American politician

Member of the New Hampshire House of Representatives from the Hillsborough 3rd district
- Incumbent
- Assumed office November 29, 2023
- Preceded by: David Cote
- Succeeded by: Michael Joseph (elect)

Personal details
- Party: Democratic
- Spouse: Ed Beauchemin
- Children: 3
- Education: Chatham University (BA); University of Pittsburgh (DN)

Paige Marie Beauchemin is an American registered nurse and Democratic politician serving in the New Hampshire House of Representatives, representing Hillsborough District 3, which includes Nashua's Ward 4. She was elected in a special election in November 2023.

Beauchemin was a candidate for the United States House of Representatives representing New Hampshire's 2nd congressional district in the 2026 election. She ran in the Democratic primary against incumbent representative Maggie Goodlander.

== Early life and education ==
Beauchemin was born in Concord, New Hampshire, and grew up in communities throughout southern New Hampshire. She graduated from Concord High School in 1997.

Beauchemin attended Chatham University in Pittsburgh, Pennsylvania, where she earned a Bachelor of Arts in psychology with minors in business and writing. She later trained as a nurse through the UPMC Shadyside School of Nursing at the University of Pittsburgh, completing her nursing diploma in 2009.

== Healthcare career ==
Beauchemin began her professional nursing career in 2010. She worked as a nurse at St. Joseph Hospital in Nashua. Beauchemin founded OwlHive Health, a maternal and perinatal education and consulting organization based in Nashua.

== Political career ==
=== New Hampshire House of Representatives ===
Beauchemin was elected to the New Hampshire House of Representatives in a special election held in November 2023 to represent Hillsborough District 3. The seat became vacant following the resignation of Democratic representative David Cote.

Beauchemin won the Democratic primary unanimously, receiving 84 votes. She went on to win the general election with 409 votes, receiving 61% of the vote.

=== 2026 congressional campaign ===
In 2025, Beauchemin announced her candidacy for the United States House of Representatives representing New Hampshire's 2nd congressional district. She unsuccessfully challenged incumbent Democratic representative Maggie Goodlander in the 2026 Democratic primary election.

Beauchemin stated that her campaign would not accept contributions from political action committees affiliated with the American Israel Public Affairs Committee (AIPAC).

== Personal life ==
Beauchemin and her husband Ed have three children. They live in Nashua, New Hampshire.

== Electoral History ==
2023 Hillsborough County District 3 (Nashua Ward 4) Special Election
Party	Candidate	Votes	%
Democratic	Paige Beauchemin	409	60.69%
Republican	David M. Narkunas	265	39.32%
Total votes		674	100.00%
