= Maggie Goodlander =

American politician (born 1986)

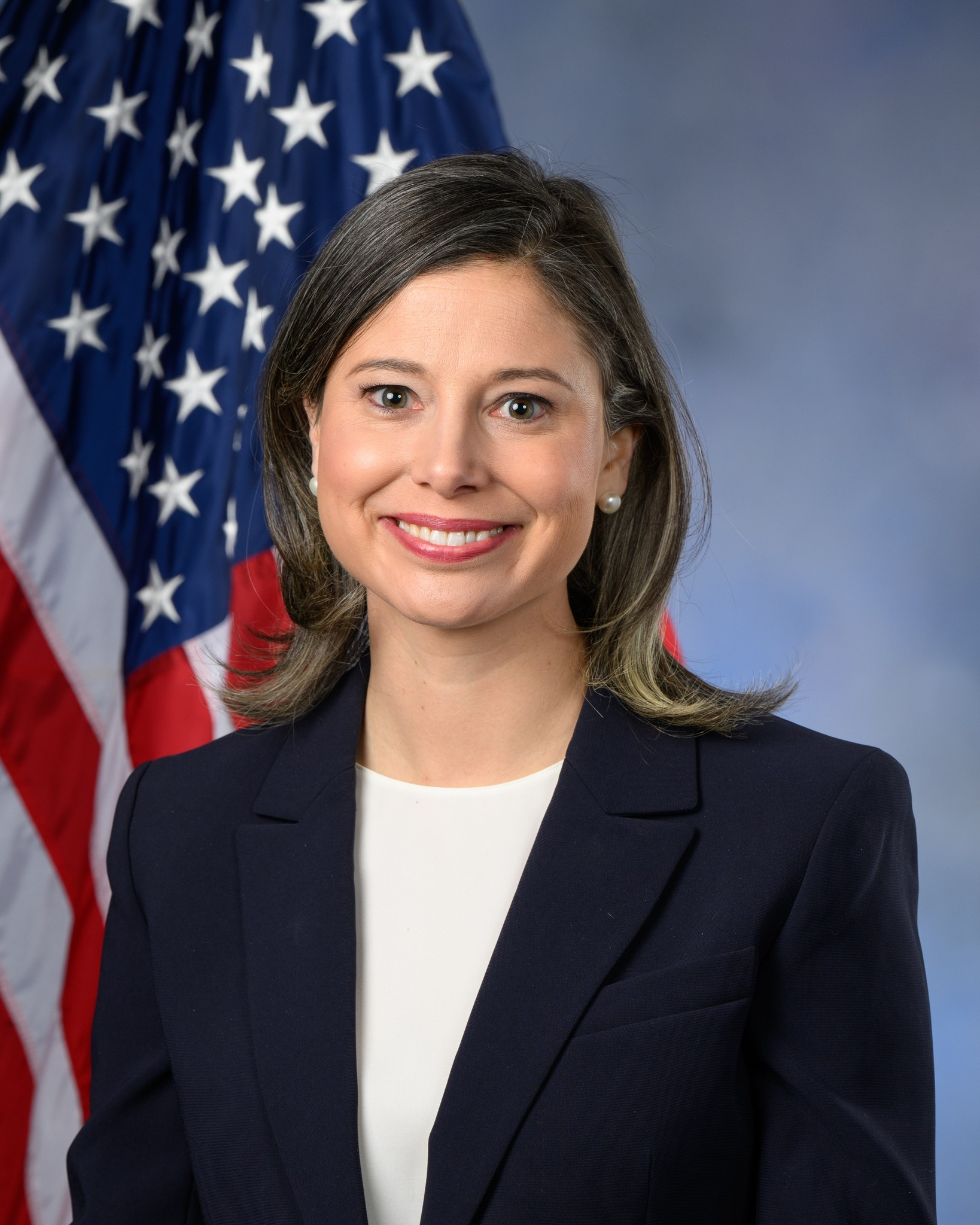
- Official portrait, 2024

Member of the U.S. House of Representatives from New Hampshire's 2nd district
- Incumbent
- Assumed office January 3, 2025
- Preceded by: Annie Kuster

Personal details
- Born: Margaret Vivian Goodlander; November 4, 1986 (age 40) Nashua, New Hampshire, U.S.
- Party: Democratic
- Spouse: Jake Sullivan (m. 2015)
- Relatives: Betty Tamposi (mother); Samuel A. Tamposi (grandfather)
- Education: Yale University (BA, JD)
- Website: House website Campaign website

Military service
- Branch/service: United States Navy; U.S. Navy Reserve
- Years of service: 2010–2022
- Rank: Lieutenant
- Unit: Naval Intelligence
- Battles/wars: Global War on Terrorism

Margaret Vivian Goodlander (born November 4, 1986) is an American politician, lawyer, and former naval officer who has served as the U.S. representative from New Hampshire's 2nd congressional district since 2025. A member of the Democratic Party, she is married to Jake Sullivan, former U.S. national security advisor.

Goodlander served as an intelligence officer in the United States Navy Reserve and worked as a foreign policy advisor in the United States Senate to Senators Joe Lieberman and John McCain. After law school, she was a law clerk for Chief Judge Merrick Garland and Justice Stephen Breyer. She served as counsel on the House Judiciary Committee during the first impeachment of Donald Trump. During the Biden administration, she was an attorney at the United States Department of Justice and senior White House advisor. She was elected to Congress in 2024 to replace retiring Democratic incumbent Annie Kuster.

== Early life and education ==
Goodlander was born on November 4, 1986, in Nashua, New Hampshire. She is a member of the Tamposi family, a prominent New Hampshire political family. Her grandfather, Samuel Tamposi, was the state's largest commercial real estate developer, a major Republican donor, and a partner of the Boston Red Sox. Her mother, Betty Tamposi, was a Republican member of the New Hampshire House of Representatives who served as Assistant Secretary of State for Consular Affairs under President George H. W. Bush.

Goodlander graduated from the Groton School in 2005. She attended Yale University, graduating with a Bachelor of Arts in history in 2009. In 2016, she obtained her Juris Doctor from Yale Law School. As a student at Yale, she was a research fellow in Lebanon, Egypt, Syria, and Libya.

== Naval and legal career ==
After graduating from Yale Law School in 2016, Goodlander served as a law clerk to Chief Judge Merrick Garland of the U.S. Court of Appeals for the District of Columbia Circuit from 2016 to 2017 and U.S. Supreme Court Justice Stephen Breyer from 2017 to 2018. She was an associate at Skadden, Arps, Slate, Meagher & Flom in 2019.

Goodlander has worked as a senior foreign policy advisor for U.S. Senators Joe Lieberman and John McCain. She served as an intelligence officer in the United States Navy Reserve for 11 years, reaching the rank of lieutenant.

Goodlander served as counsel to the House Judiciary Committee during the first impeachment of Donald Trump, where she co-authored a 55-page report describing the constitutional grounds for impeaching Trump. Following Trump's acquittal by the U.S. Senate in February 2020, she began working as counsel to Co-Equal, an activist organization that advocates for increased congressional funding and support for federal agencies that provide research and policy advice to members of Congress.

Goodlander taught constitutional law at the University of New Hampshire and Dartmouth College from 2019 to 2021. She also served on the boards of the New Hampshire Women's Foundation, New Hampshire Legal Assistance, the World Affairs Council of New Hampshire, and the Rudman Center Advisory Board.

In January 2021, Goodlander joined the United States Department of Justice as counselor to the attorney general under Garland, who had become U.S. attorney general under President Joe Biden and under whom Goodlander clerked after law school. She served as a deputy assistant attorney general for the Antitrust Division from September 12, 2022 to February 23, 2024, overseeing the international, appellate, and policy work, preceded by Rene Augustine and succeeded by John Elias.

After leaving the Justice Department, she briefly served as a White House senior advisor, where she led the Biden administration's Unity Agenda for the Nation.

== U.S. House of Representatives ==
=== Elections ===
==== 2024 ====
On May 9, 2024, Goodlander announced her candidacy in the Democratic primary for New Hampshire's 2nd congressional district in the 2024 elections to succeed retiring U.S. Representative Annie Kuster. Her mother, Betty Tamposi, ran for the same seat as a Republican in 1988 but lost the primary to Chuck Douglas, who had asserted that it would be inappropriate for a mother to hold political office while raising young children. Goodlander defeated former New Hampshire Executive Councilor Colin Van Ostern, who had been endorsed by Kuster, with 63.8% of the vote to Van Ostern's 36.2%. In the general election, Goodlander defeated Republican nominee and libertarian activist Lily Tang Williams 52.9% to 47.1%.

=== Tenure ===
Goodlander assumed office on January 3, 2025. She succeeded retiring U.S. Representative Annie Kuster.

Goodlander had initially expressed interest in a 2026 Senate run, but announced in April 2025 that she would not run.

In November 2025, Goodlander was one of six people, all Democratic lawmakers, to be part of a video telling servicemembers they can refuse illegal orders. In response later that month, President Trump posted on social media calling those in the video, including Goodlander, traitors who should be charged with sedition punishable by death, and shared a social media post calling for them to be hanged.

In June 2026, she was one of 10 House Democrats to sign onto Promise to America, a pro-capitalist, anti-socialist initiative, launched after three candidates backed by the Democratic Socialists of America won Democratic primary elections.

=== Committee assignments ===
For the 119th Congress:

- Committee on Armed Services
  - Subcommittee on Military Personnel
  - Subcommittee on Tactical Air and Land Forces
- Committee on Small Business
  - Subcommittee on Economic Growth, Tax, and Capital Access
  - Subcommittee on Oversight, Investigations, and Regulations
  - Subcommittee on Rural Development, Energy, and Supply Chains

=== Caucus memberships ===
- New Democrat Coalition
- Future Forum
- Labor Caucus
- House Baltic Caucus

== Personal life ==
Goodlander is married to Jake Sullivan, who served as United States national security advisor under President Joe Biden from 2021 to 2025. They met at the Munich Security Conference during the Obama administration when Goodlander worked for U.S. Senator Joe Lieberman and Sullivan worked as an advisor for then-U.S. Secretary of State Hillary Clinton. They married on June 6, 2015, in New Haven, Connecticut. They rent a home in Nashua, New Hampshire, and also own a $1.2 million home in Portsmouth, New Hampshire.

Goodlander became pregnant in late 2022, but during her pregnancy, the fetus was diagnosed with a fatal condition and died in utero. While awaiting a medical procedure to remove the fetus, Goodlander went into labor and gave birth to a stillborn son in a hotel bathtub on Easter. She has cited the experience as inspiring her to campaign for abortion rights.

== Electoral history ==
2024 New Hampshire's 2nd congressional district election
Primary election
Party	Candidate	Votes	%
Democratic	Maggie Goodlander	42,960	63.74%
Democratic	Colin Van Ostern	24,342	36.12%
Write-in		94	0.14%
Total votes		67,396	100.00%
General election
Democratic	Maggie Goodlander	211,641	52.93%
Republican	Lily Tang Williams	187,810	46.97%
Write-in		367	0.09%
Total votes		399,818	100.00%
Democratic hold			

2026 New Hampshire's 2nd congressional district election
Primary election
Party	Candidate	Votes	%
Democratic	Maggie Goodlander	59,817	81.92%
Democratic	Paige Beauchemin	13,205	18.08%
Write-in		109	0.15%
Total votes		73,022	100.00%

U.S. House of Representatives
Preceded by Annie Kuster	Member of the U.S. House of Representatives from New Hampshire's 2nd congressional district 2025–present	Incumbent
U.S. order of precedence (ceremonial)
Preceded by Craig Goldman	United States representatives by seniority 384th	Succeeded by Adam Gray
