= Citrus County Transit =

Public transportation agency in Florida, US

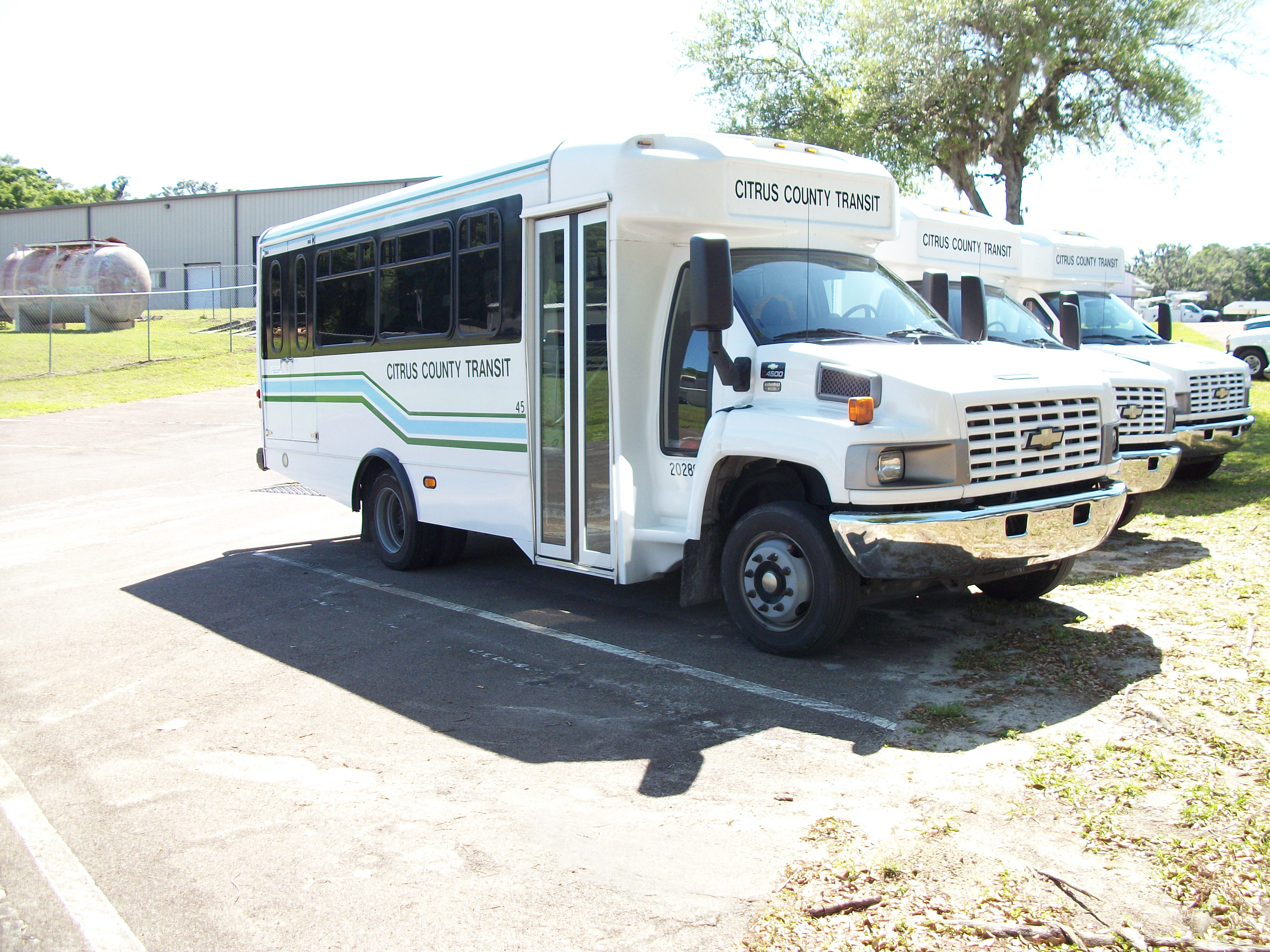
- Citrus County Bus at a county-run facility in Lecanto, Florida
- Locale: Lecanto, Florida
- Service area: Citrus County, Florida
- Service type: bus service
- Routes: 5
- Fuel type: gasoline

Citrus County Transit is the public transportation agency that serves Citrus County, Florida.

The service provides on-demand service on Monday-Friday and operates the Orange Line, a fixed route which connects Beverly Hills, Homosassa, Lecanto Crystal River and Inverness, on Monday-Friday.
