= Citrus Hills, Florida =

Census-designated place in Florida, US

Citrus Hills
- Census-designated place
- Location in Citrus County and the state of Florida
- Coordinates: 28°52′34″N 82°25′34″W
- Country: United States
- State: Florida
- County: Citrus

Area
  - Total: 9.70 sq mi (25.12 km^{2})
  - Land: 9.70 sq mi (25.11 km^{2})
  - Water: 0.0039 sq mi (0.01 km^{2})
- Elevation: 112 ft (34 m)

Population (2020)
  - Total: 9,302
  - Density: 959.4/sq mi (370.43/km^{2})
- Time zone: UTC-5 (Eastern (EST))
  - Summer (DST): UTC-4 (EDT)
- FIPS code: 12-12412
- GNIS feature ID: 2402775

Citrus Hills is a census-designated place (CDP) in Citrus County, Florida, United States. The population was 9,302 at the 2020 census, up from 7,470 at the 2010 census. It is part of the Homosassa Springs, Florida Metropolitan Statistical Area.

The CDP takes its name from The Villages of Citrus Hills, a master-planned community first developed by Gerald Nash and Sam Tamposi in the 1970s. (Although sharing a similar name with The Villages, the well-known giant Central Florida retirement community, the two developments are not related.)

== Geography ==
Citrus Hills is located northeast of the center of Citrus County. It is bordered by Pine Ridge to the north, Hernando to the northeast, Inverness Highlands North to the east, and Lecanto to the south and west. Citrus Hills is approximately 9 miles (14 km) northwest of Inverness, the Citrus County seat.

According to the United States Census Bureau, Citrus Hills has a total area of 9.7 square miles (25.1 km^{2}), of which 0.004 square miles (0.01 km^{2}), or 0.05%, is water.

== Demographics ==
Historical population
Census	Pop.	Note	%±
2000	4,029		—
2010	7,470		85.4%
2020	9,302		24.5%
U.S. Decennial Census

=== 2020 census ===
As of the 2020 census, Citrus Hills had a population of 9,302. The median age was 67.3 years. 7.6% of residents were under the age of 18 and 55.7% of residents were 65 years of age or older. For every 100 females there were 92.4 males, and for every 100 females age 18 and over there were 92.0 males age 18 and over.

99.8% of residents lived in urban areas, while 0.2% lived in rural areas.

There were 4,305 households in Citrus Hills, of which 10.9% had children under the age of 18 living in them. Of all households, 67.0% were married-couple households, 10.7% were households with a male householder and no spouse or partner present, and 17.5% were households with a female householder and no spouse or partner present. About 21.7% of all households were made up of individuals and 16.3% had someone living alone who was 65 years of age or older.

There were 4,849 housing units, of which 11.2% were vacant. The homeowner vacancy rate was 2.9% and the rental vacancy rate was 14.3%.

Racial composition as of the 2020 census
Race	Number	Percent
White	7,934	85.3%
Black or African American	251	2.7%
American Indian and Alaska Native	24	0.3%
Asian	527	5.7%
Native Hawaiian and Other Pacific Islander	5	0.1%
Some other race	111	1.2%
Two or more races	450	4.8%
Hispanic or Latino (of any race)	487	5.2%

=== 2000 census ===
As of the census of 2000, there were 4,029 people, 1,783 households, and 1,485 families residing in the CDP. The population density was 411.2 inhabitants per square mile (158.8/km^{2}). There were 2,137 housing units at an average density of 218.1 per square mile (84.2/km^{2}). The racial makeup of the CDP was 92.78% White, 1.44% African American, 0.32% Native American, 4.02% Asian, 0.45% from other races, and 0.99% from two or more races. Hispanic or Latino of any race were 2.83% of the population.

There were 1,783 households, out of which 15.1% had children under the age of 18 living with them, 78.4% were married couples living together, 3.4% had a female householder with no husband present, and 16.7% were non-families. 13.7% of all households were made up of individuals, and 8.0% had someone living alone who was 65 years of age or older. The average household size was 2.26 and the average family size was 2.46.

In the CDP, the population was spread out, with 13.3% under the age of 18, 2.2% from 18 to 24, 13.3% from 25 to 44, 36.6% from 45 to 64, and 34.6% who were 65 years of age or older. The median age was 59 years. For every 100 females, there were 96.1 males. For every 100 females age 18 and over, there were 94.5 males.

The median income for a household in the CDP was $48,229, and the median income for a family was $53,222. Males had a median income of $35,125 versus $24,875 for females. The per capita income for the CDP was $25,753. About 4.3% of families and 6.5% of the population were below the poverty line, including 16.2% of those under age 18 and 1.4% of those age 65 or over.

== Education ==
The CDP is served by Citrus County Schools. Elementary schools serving sections of the CDP include Central Ridge, Forest Ridge, and Hernando. Middle schools serving sections of the CDP include Citrus Springs, Inverness, and Lecanto. High schools serving sections of the CDP include Citrus High School and Lecanto High School.
