= Gerald Nash =

Gerald Nash may refer to:

- Gerald Ewart Nash (1896–1976), Canadian World War I flying aces
- Ged Nash (Gerald Henry Nash, born 1975), Irish Labour Party politician
