= Monty Grow =

American football player (born 1971)

No. 22, 28
- Position: Safety

Personal information
- Born: September 4, 1971 (age 55); Inverness, Florida, U.S.
- Listed height: 6 ft 4 in (1.93 m)
- Listed weight: 214 lb (97 kg)

Career information
- High school: Citrus (Inverness)
- College: Florida (1989–1993)
- NFL draft: 1994: undrafted
- Expansion draft: 1995: 20th round, 39th overall pick

Career history
- Kansas City Chiefs (1994); Jacksonville Jaguars (1995–1996); Green Bay Packers (1997)*
- * Offseason or practice squad member only

Career NFL statistics
- Tackles: 14
- Interceptions: 2
- Forced fumbles: 1
- Stats at Pro Football Reference

Monty Roy Grow (born September 4, 1971) is an American former professional football player who was a defensive back for two seasons in the National Football League (NFL) with the Kansas City Chiefs and Jacksonville Jaguars. He played college football for the Florida Gators.

== Early life and college ==
Monty Roy Grow was born on September 4, 1971, in Inverness, Florida. He attended Citrus High School in Inverness.

Grow played college football for the Gators of the University of Florida. He was a letterman in 1989, 1990, 1992, and 1993. He was suspended for the entire 1991 season after testing positive for a banned substance. Grow recorded one interception in 1990 and one interception in 1993.

== Professional career ==
Grow signed with the Kansas City Chiefs on May 2, 1994, after going undrafted in the 1994 NFL draft. He played in 15 game for the Chiefs during the 1994 season, recording seven solo tackles, one assisted tackle, one forced fumble, and one interception. He also appeared in one playoff game in 1994.

Grow was selected by the Jacksonville Jaguars in the 20th round, with the 39th overall pick, of the 1995 NFL expansion draft. He played in four games, starting one, for the Jaguars in 1995, totaling five solo tackles, one assisted tackle, and one interception. He was placed on injured reserve on September 27, 1995. Grow became a free agent after the 1995 season and re-signed with Jacksonville on May 16, 1996. He was placed on injured reserve again on August 14, 1996, and missed the entire 1996 season.

Grow signed with the Green Bay Packers in free agency on February 12, 1997. He was released on April 22, 1997.

== Legal issues ==
In 2013, Grow was arrested for child abuse, after leaving his 3-year-old child locked in a car, without any adult supervision. In 2016, Grow was arrested for being a leader in a massive healthcare-fraud conspiracy, and in 2018 was found guilty of 17 counts of health care fraud and money laundering. He was sentenced to 22 years in prison in connection with the healthcare-fraud conviction and ordered to pay approximately $18 million in restitution.

On October 21, 2020, the United States Court of Appeals for the Eleventh Circuit found that the evidence was sufficient to support Grow’s convictions, and that the district court’s instructions to the jury were not coercive or prejudicial, and that Grow invited any error that the district court may have committed. The Eleventh Circuit, however, vacated the sentence on Count I of the indictment and remanded the case for further proceedings.
