= Tracy Greene =

American football player (born 1972)

No. 87, 84
- Position: Tight end

Personal information
- Born: November 5, 1972 (age 54); Monroe, Louisiana, U.S.
- Listed height: 6 ft 5 in (1.96 m)
- Listed weight: 270 lb (122 kg)

Career information
- High school: Grambling (LA) Lab
- College: Grambling State
- NFL draft: 1994: 7th round, 219th overall pick

Career history
- Kansas City Chiefs (1994); Pittsburgh Steelers (1995); Tampa Bay Buccaneers (1997)*
- * Offseason or practice squad member only

Career NFL statistics
- Receptions: 6
- Receiving yards: 69
- Receiving TDs: 1
- Games played: 25
- Stats at Pro Football Reference

Tracy Lamar Greene (born November 5, 1972) is an American former professional football player who was a tight end for the Kansas City Chiefs and Pittsburgh Steelers of the National Football League (NFL). He played college football for the Grambling State Tigers and was selected by the Chiefs in the seventh round (219th overall) of the 1994 NFL draft. He participated in the 1995–96 NFL playoffs and in Super Bowl XXX.
