= Elizabeth M. Tamposi =

American politician and diplomat

10th Assistant Secretary of State for Consular Affairs
- In office October 18, 1989 – November 10, 1992
- President: George H. W. Bush
- Preceded by: Joan M. Clark
- Succeeded by: Mary A. Ryan

Member of the New Hampshire House of Representatives
- In office 1979–1986

Personal details
- Born: February 13, 1955 (age 71) Nashua, New Hampshire, U.S.
- Party: Republican
- Relations: Samuel A. Tamposi (father)
- Children: Maggie Goodlander
- Education: University of New Hampshire (BA); Harvard University (MPA, MTS); Fordham University (PhD)

Elizabeth Marian Tamposi (born 1955) is an American former politician and diplomat who served as United States Assistant Secretary of State for Consular Affairs from October 18, 1989, until November 10, 1992.

She served as a member of the New Hampshire House of Representatives from 1979 to 1986.

== Early life ==
Tamposi was born in Nashua, New Hampshire, on February 13, 1955, the daughter of Nashua real estate developer Samuel A. Tamposi and his wife Barbara St. Pierre. She is one of six children, with brothers Samuel A. Jr., Michael A., Nicholas E., sister Celina, and brother Stephen A. (Their parents divorced in 1986. Their father married again, to the former Eileen Maloney, who had three children by her first marriage.) Samuel was one of three sons of Aromanian immigrants from Avdella, Greece.

Tamposi earned a B.A. from the University of New Hampshire, and a Master of Public Administration in 1984 from Harvard University. She later returned to Harvard for a Master of Theological Studies in 2010. She earned a PhD from Fordham University, completing her dissertation in 2021.

== Early career ==
After college, Tamposi worked for Tamposi Company, her father's real estate company, eventually becoming vice president and partner. She later became president and sole shareholder of Hollis Crossing Realty, Inc., a real estate marketing and sales company.

Tamposi served in the New Hampshire House of Representatives from 1979 to 1986, chairing the House Ways and Means Committee and implementing a rainy day fund for the state.

During the 1988 congressional election, Tamposi sought election to the United States House of Representatives from New Hampshire, but lost the Republican primary. The primary was marred by controversy after Senator Gordon Humphrey asserted it would be inappropriate for Tamposi, a mother of young children, to leave the home and hold political office.

== State Department career ==
On August 4, 1989, President of the United States George H. W. Bush nominated Tamposi as Assistant Secretary of State for Consular Affairs. After Senate confirmation, she held this office from October 18, 1989 until November 10, 1992. As Assistant Secretary, Tamposi travelled to 70 countries to assist Americans in need, and implemented measures to make the visa and passport application process more efficient.

Tamposi resigned a week after the 1992 U.S. presidential election of November 3, 1992, amidst allegations that she had abused her position as head of the Bureau of Consular Affairs, the bureau responsible for issuing United States passports. According to Tamposi, on September 28, 1992, she was contacted by Acting Assistant Secretary of State for Legislative Affairs Stephen K. Berry on behalf of the White House, asking her to search the consular records for a purported letter in which Democratic presidential candidate Bill Clinton either renounced his U.S. citizenship, or sought information about how to go about renouncing it, during his Vietnam War protest days in the late 1960s. Tamposi directed her subordinates to make such a search. She also later ordered a search of the passport records of third party candidate Ross Perot. When these searches were made public, Acting United States Secretary of State Lawrence Eagleburger fired Tamposi as Assistant Secretary of State for Consular Affairs on November 10, 1992. Tamposi argued that her superiors in the United States Department of State were aware of these requests and that she was being unfairly singled out for her role in the scandal.

Tamposi's name was later cleared of any wrongdoing and President Bush wrote her a hand-written apology stating that she is of "good character."

== Personal life ==
Tamposi married Ted Goodlander, and they had two daughters together.

Maggie Goodlander is a former United States Deputy Attorney General and Congresswoman for New Hampshire's 2nd congressional district since 2025. She is married to Jake Sullivan, a former National Security Advisor.

From 2005 to 2011, Tamposi served as a member of the Board of Governors of the University of New Hampshire.

Government offices
Preceded by Joan M. Clark	Assistant Secretary of State for Consular Affairs; October 18, 1989 – November 10, 1992	Succeeded by Mary A. Ryan
