= 1991 San Diego Chargers season =

NFL 32nd team season

- Owner: Alex Spanos
- General manager: Bobby Beathard
- Head coach: Dan Henning
- Home stadium: Jack Murphy Stadium

Results
- Record: 4–12
- Division place: 5th AFC West
- Playoffs: Did not qualify
- All-Pros: None
- Pro Bowlers: 1: RB Marion Butts; LB Junior Seau; CB Gill Byrd

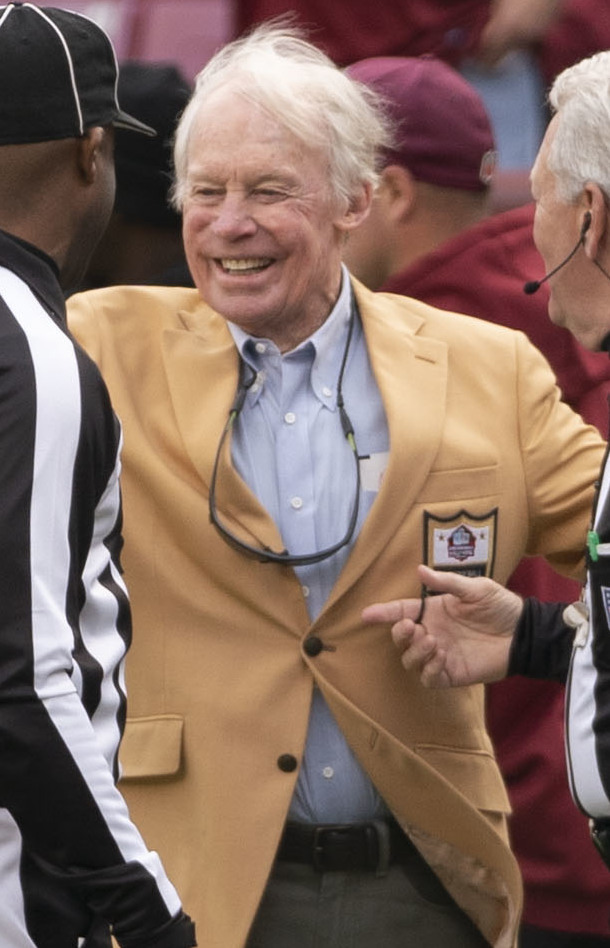
In 1991, general manager Bobby Beathard used a mix of free agency, trades and the draft to bring in several key members of the squad who contested Super Bowl XXIX three years later.

The 1991 San Diego Chargers season was the franchise's 22nd season in the National Football League (NFL), their 32nd overall and the third and final season under head coach Dan Henning. The team failed to improve on their 6–10 record in 1990, losing eight of their first nine games and finishing at 4–12, their fourth consecutive losing season.

San Diego's poor record contrasted with a roughly average statistical season. They struggled in close games, going 2–8 when the margin was seven points or fewer; during Henning's reign, they were a cumulative 6–22 in such games. The Chargers did manage some good wins, defeating two teams (Note: the Los Angeles Raiders and the New Orleans Saints) who made the playoffs in 1991, and a third who missed the postseason only because of their defeat in San Diego.

Second-year quarterback John Friesz won a preseason battle with Billy Joe Tolliver for the starting role, but struggled throughout the season, throwing more interceptions than touchdowns. The Chargers' passing offense was among the NFL's weakest, but their running game, featuring Marion Butts, Rod Bernstine and Ronnie Harmon, ranked second in the league with over 2,200 yards. San Diego's defense regressed in ranking, dropping from 5th in total yardage the previous year to 19th in 1991. Despite this, Leslie O'Neal, Junior Seau and Gill Byrd again had strong seasons, with Seau voted to the first of 12 consecutive Pro Bowls.

Henning, together with his entire coaching staff, was fired by general manager Bobby Beathard the day after the season ended.

== Offseason ==
=== Departures and arrivals ===
Lee Williams ended 1990 as the Chargers' career sack leader since records began in 1982, with 65½ through seven seasons. Williams was displeased at being asked to play defensive tackle, and wanted to renegotiate his contract. He became a holdout, and was threatening legal action to void his existing contract when Beathard opted to trade him to Houston, shortly before the season began. In return, San Diego received the Oilers' 1st-round draft pick in 1992, as well as rookie wide receiver Shawn Jefferson.

Billy Joe Tolliver, who had started fourteen games the previous season, lost a training camp battle with John Friesz for the starting quarterback role. Friesz was named the starter on August 23, in the aftermath of the Chargers' final preseason game. Only five days later, Tolliver was traded to the Atlanta Falcons for their fifth-round pick in the 1992 draft, Another quarterback, Mark Vlasic, was left unprotected from Plan B free agency, and signed for the Kansas City Chiefs in March. Vlasic had started once for the Chargers the previous season, and three times in total. Other offensive departures included wide receiver Quinn Early, a 2nd-round pick in 1988 who was left exposed to Plan B free agency after catching 55 passes in three seasons, and claimed by the New Orleans Saints. Veteran tight end Arthur Cox was released midseason, on October 29. After joining the Chargers as a free agent in 1988, he had been a starter through most of his first three seasons, but had seen less time in 1991. Dan Henning described Cox's performance in practice as "inconsistent", while general manager Bobby Beathard said the player had committed numerous errors.

While the Chargers defense had ranked fifth in the league the previous season, Beathard announced soon after the season ended that starting safety Vencie Glenn would not be retained in 1991. Glenn, a starter in 65 of the previous 67 games, was left unprotected in Plan B free agency, amid rumors of a lack of attention to conditioning, and a failure to report to training camp while negotiating a contract. Linebacker Cedric Figaro was also left unprotected: he had started fourteen games in 1989, but only one in 1990 with rookie Junior Seau preferred. Nose tackle Les Miller, a starter in ten games the previous year, joined Early as a Plan B signing for the Saints.

In total, the Chargers lost a league-high eleven players through Plan B free agency, while signing eight players, none of whom were considered big names. Two of these players would go on to start every game during the Chargers' 1994 Super Bowl run, however. Safety Darren Carrington played in all 64 regular season games during his four years in San Diego, starting 35 and intercepting 19 passes; tackle Harry Swayne had accumulated only three starts in four years in Tampa Bay, but started 74 in six years with the Chargers. They also signed journeyman quarterback Bob Gagliano to compete for the starting job.

Shawn Jefferson, who came to San Diego in the Lee Williams trade, caught only twelve passes in his first season as a Charger, but would increase his production in each of the next four years, and was another 1991 acquisition who went on to start every game in 1994.

=== NFL draft ===
The Chargers had the ninth pick in the draft - they used this on Stanley Richard, a safety Beathard described as, "one of the top two football players in the draft," noting that he had the speed to play cornerback as well as safety. Chargers staff expected Richard to start games as a rookie. Despite a lengthy holdout (resolved on August 3), he did, with fourteen starts in 1991. During a four-season stint in San Diego, Richard would go on to start 60 regular season games, including all sixteen during the 1994 Super Bowl run.

San Diego had three 2nd-round selections. With the first of these, they selected defensive tackle George Thornton, who went on to start sixteen games in two seasons with the club. The second, acquired through the previous season's trade of Gary Anderson to Tampa Bay, was used on running back Eric Bieniemy. He scored four touchdowns in four years with the Chargers, backing up Marion Butts and later Natrone Means. Finally, Beathard agreed to a draft-day deal, sending the Chargers' 1992 1st-round pick to Washington in exchange for the Redskins' 2nd-round pick in 1991 and their 5th-round pick in 1992. He selected guard Eric Moten, who spent his six-year career in San Diego, starting 61 games despite a severe knee injury in 1993. Some analysts were surprised by the selection of Bieniemy, the Chargers already having a strong running game, and by the price paid for Moten.

In the later rounds, San Diego selected tight end Duane Young. Primarily a blocker, he had 38 receptions in 64 starts across five seasons with the Chargers. Wide receiver Yancey Thigpen was a Pro Bowler twice in his career. However, he achieved this in Pittsburgh, where he was traded after failing to make an impact during his solitary year in San Diego.

1991 San Diego Chargers draft
| Round | Pick | Player | Position | College | Notes |
| 1 | 9 | Stanley Richard | Defensive back | Texas | |
| 2 | 36 | George Thornton | Defensive tackle | Alabama | |
| 2 | 39 | Eric Bieniemy | Running back | Colorado | |
| 2 | 47 | Eric Moten | Guard | Michigan State | |
| 4 | 90 | Yancey Thigpen * | Wide receiver | Winston-Salem State | |
| 5 | 123 | Duane Young | Tight end | Michigan State | |
| 5 | 127 | Floyd Fields | Defensive back | Arizona State | |
| 6 | 150 | Jimmy Laister | Offensive tackle | Oregon Tech | |
| 7 | 177 | David Jones | Tight end | Delaware State | |
| 7 | 192 | Terry Beauford | Guard | Florida A&M | |
| 9 | 230 | Andy Katoa | Linebacker | Southern Oregon | |
| 10 | 254 | Roland Poles | Running back | Tennessee | |
| 10 | 257 | Mike Heldt | Center | Notre Dame | |
| 11 | 290 | Joachim Weinberg | Wide receiver | Johnson C. Smith | |
| 12 | 317 | Chris Samuels | Running back | Texas | |
Made roster * Made at least one Pro Bowl during career

== Personnel ==
=== Staff ===
1991 San Diego Chargers staff
| Front office: Chairman of the board and president – Alex Spanos; Vice chairman – Dean Spanos; General manager – Bobby Beathard; Assistant general manager – Dick Daniels; Director of player personnel – Billy Devaney; Director of pro personnel – Rudy Feldman; Director of college scouting – John Hinek; Coordinator of football operations – Marty Hurney; Head coaches: Head coach – Dan Henning; Offensive coaches: Assistant head coach/offensive coordinator – Ted Tollner; Offensive backs – Bobby Jackson; Receivers – Charlie Joiner; Tight ends – Ed White; Offensive line – Alex Gibbs; Offensive assistant – Jack Reilly | Defensive coaches: Defensive coordinator – Ron Lynn; Defensive line – Chuck Clausen; Linebackers – Mike Haluchak; Secondary – Jim L. Mora; Special teams coaches: Special teams coordinator – Larry Pasquale; Special teams assistant – LeCharls McDaniel; Special teams assistant – Stan Kwan; Strength and conditioning: Strength and conditioning – John Dunn |

=== Roster ===
1991 San Diego Chargers roster
| Quarterbacks (QB): 17 John Friesz; 16 Bob Gagliano; 7 Jeff Graham; Running backs (RB): 82 Rod Bernstine; 32 Eric Bieniemy; 35 Marion Butts; 33 Ronnie Harmon; 34 Steve Hendrickson FB; Wide receivers (WR): 80 Shawn Jefferson; 81 Nate Lewis; 85 Kitrick Taylor PR; 84 Yancey Thigpen; Tight ends (TE): 31 Craig McEwen; 89 Derrick Walker; 87 Duane Young | Offensive linemen (OL): 63 Frank Cornish; 67 Leo Goeas T; 53 Courtney Hall C; 73 Mark May G/T; 77 Eric Moten G; 65 David Richards G; 76 Broderick Thompson T; 70 Mike Zandofsky G; Defensive linemen (DL): 95 Mitchell Benson NT; 92 Burt Grossman DE; 98 Skip McClendon DE; 75 Joe Phillips NT; 93 George Thornton DE | Linebackers (LB): 59 Greg Clark OLB; 94 Randy Kirk ILB; 91 Leslie O'Neal OLB; 50 Gary Plummer ILB; 57 Henry Rolling OLB; 55 Junior Seau ILB; 56 Galand Thaxton ILB; Defensive backs (DB): 44 Martin Bayless SS; 37 Anthony Blaylock CB; 22 Gill Byrd CB; 29 Darren Carrington FS; 28 Donnie Elder; 26 Floyd Fields SS; 27 Donald Frank CB; 47 Cedric Mack CB; 24 Stanley Richard FS; 30 Sam Seale CB; Special teams (ST): 3 John Carney K; 10 John Kidd P | Practice squad: 71 Sheldon Haliburton T; 51 Andy Katoa LB; Reserve: 74 Terry Beauford G (IR); 61 Eric Floyd G/T (IR); 58 David Grayson LB (IR); 97 George Hinkle DE (IR); 66 Darryl Jenkins T (IR); 9 David Jones WR (PUP); 21 Derrick Kelson CB (IR); 83 Anthony Miller WR (IR); 64 Mark Rodenhauser LS (IR); 20 Chris Samuels RB (IR); 79 Tony Savage NT (IR); 23 Anthony Shelton S (IR); 54 Billy Ray Smith LB (IR); 72 Harry Swayne T (IR); Rookies in italics 47 active, 14 reserve, 2 practice squad |

== Preseason ==
Ronnie Harmon made several big plays as the Chargers won their preseason opener against the Oilers. He was the top receiver in the game for either team, gaining 111 yards on three receptions, including touchdowns catches of 64 and 35 yards from Billy Joe Tolliver. He was also the top rusher, despite having only one carry: a 51-yarder that set up Tolliver's third touchdown pass. Tolliver's main rival for the starting quarterback role, John Friesz, connected with Yancey Thigpen for a touchdown of his own in the second half (neither passer was intercepted). Houston led 29–28 late in the game, but Donnie Elder's interception set up John Carney to hit the winning field goal from 27 yards out with 2:04 to play.

Having scored 31 points in their opener, the Chargers could only manage a total of 23 in their next three games, all losses. Head coach Dan Henning expressed disappointment with the performance of both quarterbacks after neither managed to complete 50% of their passes against the Rams, though Friesz was let down by Anthony Miller dropping a probable touchdown pass. The defense struggled the following week, letting 49ers' quarterback Steve Young break four tackles on a 47-yard touchdown run, and giving up another touchdown on a drive lasting over 12 minutes. Neither quarterback had over 100 passing yards, and rookie Eric Bieniemy scored the Chargers' only touchdown in the 4th quarter.

Friesz won the starting quarterback role in the final preseason game. After Tolliver had struggled, going 7 of 17 attempts for 94 yards, with an interception and a fumble lost, Friesz entered the game and completed 17 of 19 attempts for 210 yards, with a 34-yard touchdown to Miller and no interceptions. Henning said in the aftermath of the game, "We'll give John a chance to keep that spark going."

| Week | Date | Opponent | Result | Record | Venue | Attendance |
|---|---|---|---|---|---|---|
| 1 | August 3 | Houston Oilers | W 31–29 | 1–0 | Jack Murphy Stadium | 43,042 |
| 2 | August 12 | at Los Angeles Rams | L 3–24 | 1–1 | Anaheim Stadium | 41,616 |
| 3 | August 19 | at San Francisco 49ers | L 13–24 | 1–2 | Candlestick Park | 53,453 |
| 4 | August 23 | Los Angeles Raiders | L 7–17 | 1–3 | Jack Murphy Stadium | 46,097 |

== Regular season ==
=== Overview ===
John Friesz, a sixth-round draft pick for San Diego in 1990, started every game. He was the first Charger quarterback to do this since Dan Fouts in 1982. Friesz threw for 2,896 yards, while throwing 12 touchdowns and 15 interceptions: he had a passer rating of 67.1, falling short of the league average of 76.2. Anthony Miller was the Chargers' leading receiver despite spending the final three weeks of the season in injured reserve; the bulk of his 649 yards came in a run of four games from Weeks 7 through 11. He was supported by 2nd-year wide receiver Nate Lewis (554 yards) and running back Ronnie Harmon (555 yards from a team-high 59 receptions), but the Chargers ranked 24th of 28 in the league for passing yardage.

By contrast, the Chargers' running game was strong, their 2,248 yards ranking second in the league. Marion Butts, who had set a club record with 1,225 the previous season, held out through preseason, trying to force a contract renegotiation he believed Beathard had previously agreed to. On August 26, after accruing fines of approximately $57,000, Butts reported to the Chargers under the advice of his new agent Leigh Steinberg. Having returned, Butts had only 16 carries during the first three weeks of the season, and finished with 72 fewer carries than the previous season. Nonetheless, he led the team with 834 yards. Rod Bernstine saw increased opportunities while Butts was eased back in, rushing for 766 yards despite a three-game midseason stint on injured reserve. He also scored eight touchdowns, a career-high. Harmon added 544 yards at an average of 6.1 yards per carry; this was the league-wide best average yards per carry from any player who gained over 500 yards.

On defense, the Chargers had been the league's 5th-ranked unit the previous year, but slipped to 19th in 1991. Cornerback Gill Byrd led the team with six interceptions, while outside linebacker Leslie O'Neal had the most quarterback sacks with 9. Junior Seau, who made the first of twelve consecutive Pro Bowls, was second with 7 sacks and was credited by the Chargers with a team-leading 129 tackles, ahead of his fellow inside linebacker Gary Plummer with 111.

John Carney had a difficult year as the Chargers' kicker, making 19 of 29 field goals. His 65.5% conversion rate was joint-26th in the league. John Kidd's 40.3 yards per punt ranked 23rd in the league. Nate Lewis had a good year as a kickoff returner, scoring a touchdown and average 25.1 yards per return, second-best in the league. Kitrick Taylor was seventh in the league with 9.6 yards per punt return.

=== Schedule ===
| Week | Date | Opponent | Result | Record | Venue | Attendance | Recap |
|---|---|---|---|---|---|---|---|
| 1 | September 1 | at Pittsburgh Steelers | **L** 20–26 | 0–1 | Three Rivers Stadium | 55,848 | Recap |
| 2 | September 8 | at San Francisco 49ers | **L** 14–34 | 0–2 | Candlestick Park | 60,753 | Recap |
| 3 | September 15 | Atlanta Falcons | **L** 10–13 | 0–3 | Jack Murphy Stadium | 44,804 | Recap |
| 4 | September 22 | at **Denver Broncos** | **L** 19–27 | 0–4 | Mile High Stadium | 73,258 | Recap |
| 5 | September 29 | **Kansas City Chiefs** | **L** 13–14 | 0–5 | Jack Murphy Stadium | 44,907 | Recap |
| 6 | October 6 | at **Los Angeles Raiders** | **W** 21–13 | 1–5 | Los Angeles Memorial Coliseum | 42,787 | Recap |
| 7 | October 13 | at Los Angeles Rams | **L** 24–30 | 1–6 | Anaheim Stadium | 47,433 | Recap |
| 8 | October 20 | Cleveland Browns | **L** 24–30 (OT) | 1–7 | Jack Murphy Stadium | 48,440 | Recap |
| 9 | October 27 | at **Seattle Seahawks** | **L** 9–20 | 1–8 | Kingdome | 58,025 | Recap |
| 10 | Bye | | | | | | |
| 11 | November 10 | **Seattle Seahawks** | **W** 17–14 | 2–8 | Jack Murphy Stadium | 43,597 | Recap |
| 12 | November 17 | New Orleans Saints | **W** 24–21 | 3–8 | Jack Murphy Stadium | 48,420 | Recap |
| 13 | November 24 | at New York Jets | **L** 3–24 | 3–9 | Giants Stadium | 59,025 | Recap |
| 14 | December 1 | **Los Angeles Raiders** | **L** 7–9 | 3–10 | Jack Murphy Stadium | 56,780 | Recap |
| 15 | December 8 | at **Kansas City Chiefs** | **L** 17–20 (OT) | 3–11 | Arrowhead Stadium | 73,330 | Recap |
| 16 | December 15 | Miami Dolphins | **W** 38–30 | 4–11 | Jack Murphy Stadium | 47,731 | Recap |
| 17 | December 22 | **Denver Broncos** | **L** 14–17 | 4–12 | Jack Murphy Stadium | 51,449 | Recap |
Note: Intra-division opponents are in **bold** text.

=== Game summaries ===
All game reports use the Pro Football Researchers' gamebook archive as a source.

==== Week 1: at Pittsburgh Steelers ====
Week One: San Diego Chargers at Pittsburgh Steelers – Game summary

| Quarter | 1 | 2 | 3 | 4 | Total |
|---|---|---|---|---|---|
| Chargers | 0 | 3 | 0 | 17 | **20** |
| Steelers | 3 | 7 | 6 | 10 | **26** |

at Three Rivers Stadium, Pittsburgh, Pennsylvania

- Date: September 1
- Game time: 4:00 p.m. EDT
- Game weather: 68 °F (20 °C), relative humidity 47%, wind 13 miles per hour (21 km/h; 11 kn)
- Game attendance: 55,848
- Referee: Gerry Austin
- TV announcers (NBC): Joel Meyers and Dan Hampton
- Box score

Game information

**First quarter**

- PIT – Gary Anderson 38-yard field goal, 10:31. Steelers 3–0. **Drive: 5 plays, 6 yards, 2:46.**

**Second quarter**

- SDG – John Carney 48-yard field goal, 7:29. Tied 3–3. **Drive: 14 plays, 49 yards, 7:56.**
- PIT – Chris Calloway 33-yard pass from Bubby Brister (Gary Anderson kick), 1:53. Steelers 10–3. **Drive: 9 plays, 80 yards, 5:36.**

**Third quarter**

- PIT – Gary Anderson 29-yard field goal, 10:01. Steelers 13–3. **Drive: 9 plays, 68 yards, 4:59.**
- PIT – Gary Anderson 31-yard field goal, 5:12. Steelers 16–3. **Drive: 8 plays, 29 yards, 3:43.**

**Fourth quarter**

- PIT – Gary Anderson 39-yard field goal, 13:56. Steelers 19–3. **Drive: 8 plays, 61 yards, 3:23.**
- SDG – Nate Lewis 11-yard pass from Rod Bernstine (John Carney kick), 10:10. Steelers 19–10. **Drive: 9 plays, 81 yards, 3:46.**
- SDG – John Carney 35-yard field goal, 2:14. Steelers 19–13. **Drive: 11 plays, 32 yards, 3:39.**
- PIT – Dwight Stone 89-yard pass from Neil O'Donnell (Gary Anderson kick), 1:30. Steelers 26–13. **Drive: 3 plays, 80 yards, 0:44.**
- SDG – Shawn Jefferson 5-yard pass from John Friesz (John Carney kick), 0:00. Steelers 26–20. **Drive: 10 plays, 80 yards, 1:30.**

**Top passers**

- SDG – John Friesz – 19/41, 192 yards, TD, INT
- PIT – Bubby Brister – 13/21, 189 yards, TD, 2 INT

**Top rushers**

- SDG – Rod Bernstine – 12 rushes, 50 yards
- PIT – Barry Foster – 17 rushes, 78 yards

**Top receivers**

- SDG – Nate Lewis – 6 receptions, 74 yards, TD
- PIT – Dwight Stone – 4 receptions, 124 yards, TD

San Diego lost their opener after giving up a crucial late touchdown. Newly installed starting quarterback John Friesz lost a fumble on the game's third play, and Gary Anderson put the Steelers ahead with a 38-yard field goal. Gill Byrd stopped the next two Steeler drives with interceptions of Bubby Brister, but the Chargers failed to convert either turnover into points, with John Carney missing a 36-yard kick after the second interception - he did, however, convert a career-high 48-yard attempt on the next Charger possession. Brister responded by leading a 9-play, 80-yard drive that ended with his touchdown pass to Chris Calloway, and the Steelers led 10–3 at halftime.

Pittsburgh dominated the 3rd quarter in terms of time of possession, holding the ball for over 11 minutes. Anderson added three further field goals, the last of these early in the final quarter, running the lead to 19–3. Ronnie Harmon's 23-yard run was the longest play on the ensuing drive, which ended with a successful trick play. Rod Bernstine took a handoff from Friesz and swept right, before pulling up and throwing to an unmarked Nate Lewis for an 11-yard touchdown. Friesz was intercepted on the first play of the next Charger drive, but the Steelers went three-and-out, and San Diego drove into range for a second successful Carney field goal, drawing to within six points with 2:14 to play. After receiving the kickoff, Pittsburgh was twice penalized and was faced with a 3rd and 19 from their own 11, with 1:44 still on the clock and San Diego holding two timeouts. Neil O'Donnell, in for an injured Brister, then threw a pass to Dwight Stone in the left flat; Stone took advantage of an Ernie Mills block on Donald Frank to break clear up the sideline for an 89-yard touchdown. The Chargers scored again through rookie wide receiver Shawn Jefferson, but no time remained on the clock by then.

John Friesz, who had completed over 89% of his passes in the final preseason game, failed to complete 50% in this game. He was 19 of 41 for 192 yards, with a touchdown and an interception. He had only 75 yards passing through the first three quarters. Dan Henning took over the playcalling duties from offensive coordinator Ted Tollner going into the final quarter; two days later, Henning fired Tollner and retained the offensive coordinator role himself for the rest of the season.

==== Week 2: at San Francisco 49ers ====
Week Two: San Diego Chargers at San Francisco 49ers – Game summary

| Quarter | 1 | 2 | 3 | 4 | Total |
|---|---|---|---|---|---|
| Chargers | 7 | 7 | 0 | 0 | **14** |
| 49ers | 3 | 14 | 14 | 3 | **34** |

at Candlestick Park, San Francisco, California

- Date: September 8
- Game time: 1:00 p.m. PDT
- Game weather: 62 °F (16.7 °C), relative humidity 75%, wind 12 miles per hour (19 km/h; 10 kn)
- Game attendance: 60,753
- Referee: Stan Kemp
- TV announcers (NBC): Charlie Jones and Todd Christensen
- Box score

Game information

**First quarter**

- SDG – Craig McEwen 1-yard pass from John Friesz (John Carney kick), 9:03. Chargers 7–0. **Drive: 10 plays, 56 yards, 5:57.**
- SF – Mike Cofer 34-yard field goal, 0:16. Chargers 7–3. **Drive: 9 plays, 40 yards, 4:03.**

**Second quarter**

- SF – Jerry Rice 32-yard pass from Steve Young (Mike Cofer kick), 3:14. 49ers 10–7. **Drive: 6 plays, 59 yards, 3:07.**
- SDG – Anthony Miller 9-yard pass from John Friesz (John Carney kick), 1:55. Chargers 14–10. **Drive: 4 plays, 72 yards, 1:19.**
- SF – John Taylor 1-yard pass from Steve Young (Mike Cofer kick), 0:16. 49ers 17–14. **Drive: 9 plays, 81 yards, 1:39.**

**Third quarter**

- SF – Jerry Rice 70-yard pass from Steve Young (Mike Cofer kick), 13:11. 49ers 24–14. **Drive: 3 plays, 79 yards, 1:49.**
- SF – Keith Henderson 6-yard run (Mike Cofer kick), 1:33. 49ers 31–14. **Drive: 6 plays, 32 yards, 3:07.**

**Fourth quarter**

- SF – Mike Cofer 28-yard field goal, 2:22. 49ers 34–14. **Drive: 14 plays, 68 yards, 9:01.**

**Top passers**

- SDG – John Friesz – 14/33, 179 yards, 2 TD, 3 INT
- SF – Steve Young – 26/36, 348 yards, 3 TD

**Top rushers**

- SDG – Rod Bernstine – 15 rushes, 73 yards
- SF – Keith Henderson – 8 rushes, 47 yards, TD

**Top receivers**

- SDG – Anthony Miller – 3 receptions, 75 yards, TD
- SF – Jerry Rice – 9 receptions, 150 yards, 2 TD

The Chargers failed to build on a strong start, as San Francisco pulled away in the second half. Donnie Elder returned the opening kickoff 42 yards to his own 44, and Rod Bernstine converted a 4th and 1 four plays later. After Bernstine picked up another first down, Marion Butts broke off a 22-yard gain before being brought down inches from the goal line. Friesz threw his only completion of the drive on the next play, faking a handoff before finding Craig McEwen in the right side of the end zone for a touchdown. San Francisco drove into Charger territory on their next three drives: on two of them, they settled for field goal tries, one of which was missed; on the third, Burt Grossman stopped Tom Rathman for no gain on 4th and inches from the 2. The 49ers broke through late in the first half, with Jerry Rice's leaping catch giving them the lead. San Diego responded quickly, with Anthony Miller's diving catch moving the ball 50 yards to the San Francisco 9, from where he scored two plays later on a quick slant. Only 1:55 remained in the half, but Steve Young led a quick 81-yard drive, finding John Taylor for a touchdown and a 17–14 halftime lead.

San Francisco maintained their momentum after the interval, with Rice catching a 70-yard touchdown pass after less than two minutes' play. The Charger defense looked to have given them a way back into the game on the next 49er possession, with George Hinkle forcing a fumble that Grossman recovered. San Diego took over on the opposition 19, but Friesz was sacked on first down and intercepted on third down. He threw a second interception on the next Charger possession, setting up a 49er touchdown, and a third late on in the game.

The Charger defense gave up 344 passing yards and 456 total yards, both of which would stand as season highs.

==== Week 3: vs. Atlanta Falcons ====
Week Three: Atlanta Falcons at San Diego Chargers – Game summary

| Quarter | 1 | 2 | 3 | 4 | Total |
|---|---|---|---|---|---|
| Falcons | 7 | 3 | 3 | 0 | **13** |
| Chargers | 0 | 7 | 0 | 3 | **10** |

at Jack Murphy Stadium, San Diego, California

- Date: September 15
- Game time: 1:00 p.m. PDT
- Game weather: 67 °F (19.4 °C), relative humidity 74%, wind 9 miles per hour (14 km/h; 7.8 kn)
- Game attendance: 44,804
- Referee: Bernie Kukar
- TV announcers (CBS): Jim Nantz and Hank Stram
- Box score

Game information

**First quarter**

- ATL – Mike Pritchard 14-yard pass from Chris Miller (Norm Johnson kick), 9:24. Falcons 7–0. **Drive: 4 plays, 45 yards, 1:46.**

**Second quarter**

- ATL – Norm Johnson 28-yard field goal, 9:29. Falcons 10–0. **Drive: 14 plays, 72 yards, 7:01.**
- SDG – Anthony Miller 15-yard pass from John Friesz (John Carney kick), 3:27. Falcons 10–7. **Drive: 3 plays, 50 yards, 1:52.**

**Third quarter**

- ATL – Norm Johnson 36-yard field goal, 3:48. Falcons 13–7. **Drive: 8 plays, 28 yards, 3:39.**

**Fourth quarter**

- SDG – John Carney 39-yard field goal, 4:59. Falcons 13–10. **Drive: 7 plays, 43 yards, 4:25.**

**Top passers**

- ATL – Chris Miller – 16/33, 198 yards, TD, INT
- SDG – John Friesz – 13/22, 136 yards, TD

**Top rushers**

- ATL – Steve Broussard – 20 rushes, 101 yards
- SDG – Rod Bernstine – 12 rushes, 78 yards

**Top receivers**

- ATL – Andre Rison – 7 receptions, 95 yards
- SDG – Ronnie Harmon – 3 receptions, 41 yards

John Carney missed three field goals as the Chargers lost a battle of winless teams. San Diego failed to cross midfield on each of their first four possessions, punting each time while the Falcons built a 10–0 lead. Anthony Shelton then intercepted Atlanta quarterback Chris Miller at midfield, and Butts swept around right end for 44 yards on the next play. The Chargers were backed up by an Eric Moten holding penalty, but Friesz found Miller for a touchdown on 2nd and goal from the 15. Carney was short from 53 yards out on the next Charger drive. Atlanta drove into San Diego territory shortly before halftime, but a holding penalty caused the final seconds to be run off the clock, denying them a field goal attempt and keeping the score at 10–7.

Rod Bernstine lost a fumble near midfield in the 3rd quarter, and Atlanta converted the turnover into three points with a field goal. On the next possession, Friesz converted a 3rd and 18 with a 20-yard pass to Miller, then found Ronnie Harmon for a 36-yard gain on the next play. The drive stalled, and Carney was wide right on a 47-yard field goal try. Atlanta drove into Charger territory, but their kicker Norm Johnson also missed (short from 53 yards). Shawn Jefferson took an end-around 27 yards on the next play; San Diego reached a 4th and 7 on the Atlanta 21 with five minutes remaining, and opted for another field goal try, which Carney made from 39 yards out. Atlanta went three-and-out when Junior Seau stopped Steve Broussard for a loss of a yard on 3rd and 1. Following a punt, the Chargers began their final drive on their own 40, with 2:17 to play. Harmon had a 10-yard run, and Friesz converted a 3rd and 1 with a 5-yard pass to McEwen, before Carney was wide left on a 47-yard kick with five seconds to play.

Bernstine carried 12 times for 78 yards, and Butts 8 times for 63, as San Diego gained 184 of their 313 total yards on the ground. It was the Chargers' worst run of losses to open a season since 1975, when they started 0–11.

==== Week 4: at Denver Broncos ====
Week Four: San Diego Chargers at Denver Broncos – Game summary

| Quarter | 1 | 2 | 3 | 4 | Total |
|---|---|---|---|---|---|
| Chargers | 3 | 3 | 3 | 10 | **19** |
| Broncos | 3 | 3 | 7 | 14 | **27** |

at Mile High Stadium, Denver, Colorado

- Date: September 22
- Game time: 2:00 p.m. MDT
- Game weather: 53 °F (11.7 °C), relative humidity 46%, wind 11 miles per hour (18 km/h; 9.6 kn)
- Game attendance: 73,258
- Referee: Larry Nemmers
- TV announcers (NBC): Tom Hammond and Joe Namath
- Box score

Game information

**First quarter**

- SDG – John Carney 41-yard field goal, 9:32. Chargers 3–0. **Drive: 4 plays, 5 yards, 0:56.**
- DEN – David Treadwell 34-yard field goal, 3:42. Tied 3–3. **Drive: 11 plays, 63 yards, 5:50.**

**Second quarter**

- SDG – John Carney 43-yard field goal, 10:02. Chargers 6–3. **Drive: 8 plays, 43 yards, 4:27.**
- DEN – David Treadwell 23-yard field goal, 0:27. Tied 6–6. **Drive: 13 plays, 59 yards, 5:03.**

**Third quarter**

- DEN – Gaston Green 5-yard run (David Treadwell kick), 7:12. Broncos 13–6. **Drive: 12 plays, 78 yards, 7:48.**
- SDG – John Carney 43-yard field goal, 3:04. Broncos 13–9. **Drive: 7 plays, 45 yards, 4:08.**

**Fourth quarter**

- SDG – John Carney 36-yard field goal, 14:23. Broncos 13–12. **Drive: 8 plays, 15 yards, 2:28.**
- DEN – Gaston Green 63-yard run (David Treadwell kick), 13:28. Broncos 20–12. **Drive: 2 plays, 65 yards, 0:55.**
- SDG – Marion Butts 27-yard run (John Carney kick), 6:11. Broncos 20–19. **Drive: 7 plays, 47 yards, 2:52.**
- DEN – Gaston Green 20-yard run (David Treadwell kick), 2:46. Broncos 27–19. **Drive: 8 plays, 79 yards, 3:25.**

**Top passers**

- SDG – John Friesz – 13/29, 139 yards, INT
- DEN – John Elway – 17/28, 218 yards, INT

**Top rushers**

- SDG – Rod Bernstine – 18 rushes, 103 yards
- DEN – Gaston Green – 24 rushes, 127 yards, 3 TD

**Top receivers**

- SDG – Ronnie Harmon – 4 receptions, 59 yards
- DEN – Mark Jackson – 4 receptions, 80 yards

Missed opportunities cost the Chargers as they stayed winless. Bernstine converted a 4th and 1 on the game's opening drive, but they stalled on the edge of field goal range and had to punt. On Denver's first play, Martin Bayless forced Gaston Green to fumble, and Hinkle recovered at the Denver 28. Friesz underthrew an open Jefferson in the front of the end zone on the next play, and San Diego settled for a field goal. After Denver tied the game, Harmon took a screen pass 30 yards on 3rd and 16, moving the Chargers back into Denver territory. Friesz had another opportunity to throw a touchdown pass, but his hurried pass went over Miller's head as he broke alone into the end zone. San Diego again settled for a field goal, before driving once more into Denver territory on their next possession. Friesz was intercepted on a 3rd and 10 from the Denver 36, and the Broncos drove into field goal range, tying the score at 6–6 shortly before halftime.

Early in the second half, Seau read an out route, intercepted John Elway, and returned the ball 44 yards for an apparent touchdown. However, Burt Grossman had jumped offside, negating the score and enabling Denver to continue their drive, which ended with a touchdown run by Green which put the Broncos ahead to stay. After Carney pulled three points back with a 43-yard field goal, Gill Byrd dove to intercept Elway at the Bronco 33. Harmon then converted a 4th and 4 with a 5-yard catch, but the Chargers had to settle for another field goal, and a 13–12 deficit early in the final quarter. Only two plays later, Green broke away for a 63-yard touchdown. After an exchange of punts, the Chargers converted on fourth down for the third time in the game, this time with Butts gaining 2 yards on a 4th and 1. Three plays later, Butts bounced off a would-be tackler behind the line of scrimmage and broke upfield, where he hurdled another Bronco and broke through diving tackles from two more, completing a 27-yard touchdown run with 6:11 to play. Denver faced a 3rd and 12 on their next possession, but Elway converted with a 33-yard completion to a wide-open Mark Jackson. Green scored his third touchdown two plays later, and the Chargers' final possession ended with Friesz being sacked and losing a fumble in Bronco territory.

Bernstine rushed 18 times for 103 yards. Denver running back Gaston Green scored three touchdowns in this game but only five others throughout his NFL career.

==== Week 5: vs. Kansas City Chiefs ====
Week Five: Kansas City Chiefs at San Diego Chargers – Game summary

| Quarter | 1 | 2 | 3 | 4 | Total |
|---|---|---|---|---|---|
| Chiefs | 7 | 7 | 0 | 0 | **14** |
| Chargers | 7 | 0 | 3 | 3 | **13** |

at Jack Murphy Stadium, San Diego, California

- Date: September 29
- Game time: 1:00 p.m. PDT
- Game weather: 69 °F (20.6 °C), relative humidity 81%, wind 9 miles per hour (14 km/h; 7.8 kn)
- Game attendance: 44,907
- Referee: Howard Roe
- TV announcers (NBC): Dick Enberg and Bill Walsh
- Box score

Game information

**First quarter**

- KAN – Christian Okoye 1-yard run (Nick Lowery kick), 13:41. Chiefs 7–0. **Drive: 3 plays, 7 yards, 1:19.**
- SDG – Rod Bernstine 2-yard run (John Carney kick), 8:01. Tied 7–7. **Drive: 9 plays, 54 yards, 5:40.**

**Second quarter**

- KAN – Robb Thomas 11-yard pass from Steve DeBerg (Nick Lowery kick), 9:05. Chiefs 14–7. **Drive: 10 plays, 71 yards, 5:47.**

**Third quarter**

- SDG – John Carney 26-yard field goal, 8:45. Chiefs 14–10. **Drive: 10 plays, 61 yards, 6:15.**

**Fourth quarter**

- SDG – John Carney 37-yard field goal, 9:30. Chiefs 14–13. **Drive: 5 plays, 26 yards, 3:18.**

**Top passers**

- KAN – Steve DeBerg – 11/20, 112 yards, TD, INT
- SDG – John Friesz – 10/25, 162 yards

**Top rushers**

- KAN – Christian Okoye – 19 rushes, 65 yards, TD
- SDG – Rod Bernstine – 26 rushes, 112 yards, TD

**Top receivers**

- KAN – Stephone Paige – 2 receptions, 22 yards
- SDG – Ronnie Harmon – 3 receptions, 48 yards

San Diego slipped to 0–5 despite shutting out the Chiefs in the second half. Rookie Kansas City running back Harvey Williams returned the opening kickoff for 76 yards, setting up a Christian Okoye touchdown only 79 seconds into the game. Nate Lewis returned the ensuing kickoff 41 yards to start the Chargers off at their own 46 yard line. Bernstine gained 14 yards on their first play from scrimmage, Harmon converted a 4th and 3 with an 18-yard reception, and Bernstine scored from 2 yards out on the ninth play of the drive. Stanley Richard snagged a Steve DeBerg pass for his first career interception on the next Chiefs drive, but DeBerg came back with a touchdown pass midway through the 2nd quarter. San Diego responded with two drives into Kansas City territory, but Friesz threw incomplete on 4th and 4 from the 37, and Carney hit the right upright on a 36-yard field goal attempt.

Trailing 14–7 entering the second half, San Diego opened up with a 61-yard drive. Friesz found Harmon and Bernstine for gains of 21 and 22 yards, but failed to notice an open McEwen in the end zone on 3rd and 7 from the 8. Friesz threw incomplete, and the Chargers settled for a Carney field goal. San Diego again went for it on fourth down on their next possession, but Friesz threw incomplete on 4th and 7 from the Kansas City 33. On the final play of the 3rd quarter, Miller appeared to have earned them a first down at the Chief 18, but Harmon was penalized for a chop block and they were forced to punt. In the final quarter, Butts took a short pass, bounced off a tackle near the line of scrimmage, and broke away for a 46-yard gain to the Kansas City 9. Three plays later, Friesz was sacked and fumbled; Derrick Walker was able to recover, enabling Carney to hit a second field goal and pull the Chargers within a point. The Chiefs, who had failed to gain a first down since their second touchdown, pick up four on their next drive, but Nick Lowery missed a 44-yard field goal with 3:11 to play. San Diego took over on their own 28, needing only a field goal to win. Friesz twice threw incomplete, before finding Harmon for 9 yards. On 4th and 1, Bernstine was stopped an inch short of a first down, and the Chiefs took over with 2:32 to play. After gaining a first down, they ran out the clock.

The Chargers lost despite outgaining the Chiefs (311 to 182), gaining more first downs (17 to 12), and forcing the game's only turnover. They had six drives inside the Chiefs' 40 yard line, but converted them into only one touchdown and two field goals. Bernstine had his second 100-yard game in a row, with 26 carries for 112 yards and a touchdown. Friesz completed less than half his passes for the fourth time in five games, with 10 completions from 25 attempts for 162 yards.

==== Week 6: at Los Angeles Raiders ====
Week Six: San Diego Chargers at Los Angeles Raiders – Game summary

| Quarter | 1 | 2 | 3 | 4 | Total |
|---|---|---|---|---|---|
| Chargers | 0 | 14 | 0 | 7 | **21** |
| Raiders | 3 | 7 | 3 | 0 | **13** |

at Memorial Coliseum, Los Angeles, California

- Date: October 6
- Game time: 1:00 p.m. PDT
- Game weather: 65 °F (18.3 °C), relative humidity 84%, wind 9 miles per hour (14 km/h; 7.8 kn)
- Game attendance: 42,787
- Referee: Jerry Markbreit
- TV announcers (NBC): Dick Enberg and Bill Walsh
- Box score

Game information

**First quarter**

- RAI – Jeff Jaeger 39-yard field goal, 4:39. Raiders 3–0. **Drive: 10 plays, 57 yards, 5:20.**

**Second quarter**

- SDG – Rod Bernstine 4-yard run (John Carney kick), 10:39. Chargers 7–3. **Drive: 7 plays, 48 yards, 4:08.**
- RAI – Ethan Horton 11-yard pass from Jay Schroeder (Jeff Jaeger kick), 7:59. Raiders 10–7. **Drive: 5 plays, 73 yards, 2:40.**
- SDG – Marion Butts 1-yard run (John Carney kick), 0:02. Chargers 14–10. **Drive: 15 plays, 68 yards, 7:57.**

**Third quarter**

- RAI – Jeff Jaeger 34-yard field goal, 8:51. Chargers 14–13. **Drive: 10 plays, 61 yards, 6:09.**

**Fourth quarter**

- SDG – Marion Butts 2-yard pass from John Friesz (John Carney kick), 11:53. Chargers 21–13. **Drive: 4 plays, 13 yards, 2:14.**

**Top passers**

- SDG – John Friesz – 12/22, 118 yards, TD
- RAI – Jay Schroeder – 15/23, 184 yards, TD, 2 INT

**Top rushers**

- SDG – Rod Bernstine – 19 rushes, 66 yards, TD
- RAI – Roger Craig – 7 rushes, 39 yards

**Top receivers**

- SDG – Ronnie Harmon – 3 receptions, 48 yards
- RAI – Mervyn Fernandez – 4 receptions, 43 yards

The Chargers finally registered their first win of the season, surprising the 3–2 Raiders. Lewis returned the opening kickoff 56 yards to the Raider 41, but San Diego could only gain 4 yards and were forced to punt. They were in Raider territory on their next two drives as well, but punted both times, either side of a Los Angeles field goal drive. San Diego's fourth drive started at the Raider 48, as they continued to enjoy an advantage in starting field position. This time, they needed only seven plays to score, with Bernstine narrowly breaking the plane of the goal line on a 4-yard carry. The Raiders needed less than three minutes to respond, Jay Schroeder throwing a touchdown shortly after Stanley Richard was flagged for a 36-yard defensive pass interference penalty. In response, San Diego used up almost all of the final eight minutes of the first half on a 15-play, 68-yard touchdown drive. They were in trouble early on, facing 2nd and 23 after a sack and a penalty, but Friesz had completions of 16 yards to Harmon and 9 yards to McEwen to keep the drive going. Further third downs were converted by Harmon's 25-yard catch and Bernstine's 1-yard run, the latter of which gave them a 1st and goal from the 2. After three plays gained only one yard, Dan Henning opted to go for it on fourth down, and Butts forced his way through the middle of the line for a touchdown and a 14–10 lead, with just two seconds remaining in the half.

Los Angeles scored a field goal on the opening possession of the second half and were threatening to take the lead early in the final quarter, having gained a first down at the Charger 33. Joe Phillips then forced a fumble by Roger Craig, which Henry Rolling recovered and returned 53 yards to the Raider 13. Four plays later, Friesz threw a 2-yard touchdown pass to Butts. The final two Raider drives were ended by interceptions, for Rolling and Byrd.

San Diego's offense continued to find more success with the run than the pass, with 158 of their 258 yards coming on the ground. It was the fifth consecutive game in which they gained at least 150 rushing yards.

==== Week 7: at Los Angeles Rams ====
Week Seven: San Diego Chargers at Los Angeles Rams – Game summary

| Quarter | 1 | 2 | 3 | 4 | Total |
|---|---|---|---|---|---|
| Chargers | 7 | 7 | 7 | 3 | **24** |
| Rams | 0 | 16 | 7 | 7 | **30** |

at Anaheim Stadium, Los Angeles, California

- Date: October 13
- Game time: 1:00 p.m. PDT
- Game weather: 68 °F (20.0 °C), relative humidity 81%, wind 7 miles per hour (11 km/h; 6.1 kn)
- Game attendance: 47,433
- Referee: Gordon McCarter
- TV announcers (NBC): Joel Meyers and Dan Hampton
- Box score

Game information

**First quarter**

- SDG – Anthony Miller 30-yard pass from John Friesz (John Carney kick), 8:51. Chargers 7–0. **Drive: 9 plays, 82 yards, 6:09.**

**Second quarter**

- RAM – Jim Price 18-yard pass from Jim Everett (Tony Zendejas kick), 11:25. Tied 7–7. **Drive: 8 plays, 80 yards, 4:29.**
- SDG – Nate Lewis 49-yard pass from John Friesz (John Carney kick), 8:38. Chargers 14–7. **Drive: 4 plays, 62 yards, 2:47.**
- RAM – Robert Delpino 1-yard run (Tony Zendejas kick), 0:19. Tied 14–14. **Drive: 14 plays, 80 yards, 8:19.**
- RAM – Safety, Kevin Greene tackled Marion Butts in end zone, 0:00. Rams 16–14.

**Third quarter**

- RAM – Robert Delpino 1-yard run (Tony Zendejas kick), 4:10. Rams 23–14. **Drive: 11 plays, 85 yards, 7:53.**
- SDG – Rod Bernstine 1 yard run (John Carney kick), 0:11. Rams 23–21. **Drive: 7 plays, 80 yards, 3:59.**

**Fourth quarter**

- RAM – Jim Price 12-yard pass from Jim Everett (Tony Zendejas kick), 11:27. Rams 30–21. **Drive: 6 plays, 87 yards, 3:44.**
- SDG – John Carney 27-yard field goal, 3:38. Rams 30–24. **Drive: 12 plays, 80 yards, 5:06.**

**Top passers**

- SDG – John Friesz – 21/33, 306 yards, 2 TD, INT
- RAM – Jim Everett – 19/25, 219 yards, 2 TD

**Top rushers**

- SDG – Rod Bernstine – 9 rushes, 57 yards, TD
- RAM – Robert Delpino – 17 rushes, 50 yards, 2 TD

**Top receivers**

- SDG – Anthony Miller – 7 receptions, 149 yards, TD
- RAM – Jim Price – 6 receptions, 82 yards, 2 TD

A pair of controversial coaching decisions played key roles as the Chargers lost another close game. They began well, taking the opening kickoff and driving 82 yards in 9 plays for a touchdown. Friesz converted three third downs on the drive, with completions of 12 yards to Lewis, 25 yards to Bernstine, and 30 yards to Miller for the touchdown. They gained a first down at the Los Angeles 28 on their next drive, but three penalties, one by Courtney Hall and two by David Richards, backed them up and they were forced to punt. The Rams then drove 80 yards in 8 plays, tying the scores with a Jim Everett touchdown pass. The Chargers needed only 5 plays to respond, with Friesz throwing his second touchdown of the half, a 49-yarder to Lewis with 8:38 to play. The Rams used the bulk of that time on another 80-yard touchdown drive, with Robert Delpino's touchdown run tying the game at 14–14, with 19 seconds left.

San Diego then misplayed a squib kick, which bounced between two Chargers and over the head of Lewis, who chased the loose ball backwards and managed to recover it at his own 1 yard line, with 14 seconds left. On the next two plays, Harmon gained a yard and Butts lost one; the Rams called timeout after each play, and stopped the clock with a single second remaining. Needing to run one more play, San Diego sent Butts on a run to the left, where an unblocked Kevin Greene tackled him well short of the goal line for a safety, and a lead the Rams did not relinquish.

Delpino scored his second touchdown of the game midway through the 3rd quarter, rounding off an 82-yard touchdown drive. The Chargers came straight back with a 7-play, 80-yard touchdown drive, Friesz completing a 43-yard pass to Miller that moved the ball to the 1, from where Bernstine went up the middle for the score. The Rams then produced their fourth 80+ yard touchdown drive of the game, this time going 87 yards, with Everett throwing another touchdown to put his team 30–21 up. Following an exchange of punts, the Chargers put together another 80-yard drive, but this one stalled at the Rams' 9 yard line. Carney's field goal drew the Chargers to within six points. They began their next drive at their own 38 with 2:22 to play. After three incompletions, Harmon could only gain 7 yards on a draw play, and the Rams took over on downs. San Diego had one more drive, but it began at their own 8 with 14 seconds to play. After a short completion, Friesz was intercepted as the game ended.

Friesz completed 21 of 33 for 306 yards, with two touchdowns and an interception, while Miller caught 7 passes for 149 yards and a touchdown. Henning was criticized for his handling of the last sequence of the first half, and for calling the late draw play on 4th and 10. Of the safety, he explained that the Chargers did not run quarterback sneaks and that they didn't consider trying a deliberate incompletion, believing that the 250-pound Butts could avoid being tackled for a loss. Of the 4th down draw play, he said, "They had a three-man line and eight people in coverage ... we felt that was our best shot to get the ball downfield."

==== Week 8: vs. Cleveland Browns ====
Week Eight: Cleveland Browns at San Diego Chargers – Game summary

| Quarter | 1 | 2 | 3 | 4 | OT | Total |
|---|---|---|---|---|---|---|
| Browns | 0 | 3 | 7 | 14 | 6 | **30** |
| Chargers | 3 | 0 | 14 | 7 | 0 | **24** |

at Jack Murphy Stadium, San Diego, California

- Date: October 20
- Game time: 1:00 p.m. PDT
- Game weather: 62 °F (16.7 °C), relative humidity 90%, wind 9 miles per hour (14 km/h; 7.8 kn)
- Game attendance: 48,440
- Referee: Pat Haggerty
- TV announcers (NBC): Don Criqui and Bob Trumpy
- Box score

Game information

**First quarter**

- SDG – John Carney 27-yard field goal, 5:54. Chargers 3–0. **Drive: 4 plays, 2 yards, 1:39.**

**Second quarter**

- CLE – Matt Stover 30-yard field goal, 0:00. Tied 3–3. **Drive: 9 plays, 69 yards, 1:27.**

**Third quarter**

- SDG – Ronnie Harmon 11-yard run (John Carney kick), 7:09. Chargers 10–3. **Drive: 6 plays, 41 yards, 2:58.**
- SDG – Marion Butts 2-yard run (John Carney kick), 3:38. Chargers 17–3. **Drive: 5 plays, 48 yards, 2:14.**
- CLE – Leroy Hoard 6-yard run (Matt Stover kick), 1:08. Chargers 17–10. **Drive: 5 plays, 76 yards, 2:30.**

**Fourth quarter**

- CLE – Joe Morris 1-yard run (Matt Stover kick), 13:42. Tied 17–17. **Drive: 5 plays, 11 yards, 1:18.**
- SDG – Steve Hendrickson 2-yard pass from John Friesz (John Carney kick), 6:38. Chargers 24–17. **Drive: 13 plays, 86 yards, 7:04.**
- CLE – Leroy Hoard 15-yard pass from Bernie Kosar (Matt Stover kick), 4:09. Tied 24–24. **Drive: 8 plays, 77 yards, 2:29.**

**Overtime**

- CLE – David Brandon 30-yard interception return, 7:20. Browns 30–24.

**Top passers**

- CLE – Bernie Kosar – 26/42, 297 yards, 2 TD
- SDG – John Friesz – 33/54, 321 yards, TD, 2 INT

**Top rushers**

- CLE – Eric Metcalf – 6 rushes, 29 yards
- SDG – Marion Butts – 16 rushes, 54 yards, TD

**Top receivers**

- CLE – Reggie Langhorne – 6 receptions, 75 yards
  CLE – Webster Slaughter – 5 receptions, 75 yards
- SDG – Anthony Miller – 8 receptions, 82 yards

San Diego's struggles in close games continued, as the Browns erased a 14-point deficit to defeat them in overtime. The Chargers opened the scoring after Kitrick Taylor's 48-yard punt return set them up at the Cleveland 12; their offense gained only 2 yards from there, but Carney made a 27-yard field goal. On their next drive, San Diego drove from their own 16 to a 4th and 1 from the Browns 2, with Friesz completing four passes of over ten yards. However, Bernstine was stopped for no gain when they tried to convert the fourth down. Cleveland went three-and-out, and Bernstine carried three times for 31 yards as the Chargers again threatened to score, reaching a 3rd and 9 from the Browns 21. This time, Friesz was sacked and fumbled, Cedric Figaro recovering for Cleveland. After a series of punts, the Browns were able to drive for a game-tying field goal as time expired in the half.

The Chargers forced punts on the first two Browns drives of the second half, giving them excellent field position both times; drives of 41 and 48 yards were capped by touchdown runs from Harmon and Butts, and San Diego led 17–3 late in the 3rd quarter. Bernie Kosar responded with completions on five consecutive plays, taking his team 76 yards for a touchdown. Two plays later, Friesz was hit as he threw, leading to an interception by Richard Brown which set the Browns up at the Charger 11. Joe Morris converted a 4th and 1 for Cleveland, and scored from a yard out on the next play. Friesz bounced back on the following possession, leading a 13-play, 86-yard drive that featured three third downs converted by passing. On the third of these, Harmon made a one-handed catch and hurdled a tackler to bring up 1st and goal at the 3. Steve Hendrickson caught a 2-yard touchdown pass two plays later. Cleveland drove 77 yards on their next possession, scoring their third touchdown in three possessions and tying the score with 4:09 to play. Friesz converted third downs with completions to Miller and Lewis as he moved the Chargers from their own 20 to the Cleveland 24. From there, they were pushed back ten yards by a holding penalty, called on Arthur Cox. Butts regained three of those yards before Carney was narrowly wide left on a 48-yard field goal attempt as time expired in regulation.

The overtime coin toss was won by San Diego, who received the kickoff and started at their own 20. Harmon picked up two first downs, with a 14-yard reception and an 11-yard run, moving the ball to midfield, but the Chargers gained only five yards on their next three plays, and John Kidd pinned Cleveland at their own 6 yard line with a punt. The Browns also gained two first downs before punting, with San Diego starting their next possession from their own 14. They reached a 2nd and 10 from their own 32, whereupon Friesz threw for Lewis off his back foot. David Brandon cut in front of Lewis to intercept the pass and return the ball 30 yards for the winning touchdown.

Friesz set three new career highs with 33 completions from 54 attempts for 321 yards, while throwing a touchdown and two interceptions. Three Cleveland linebackers had takeaways: Figaro, Brown and Brandon. Each of these players was a former Charger.

==== Week 9: at Seattle Seahawks ====
Week Nine: San Diego Chargers at Seattle Seahawks – Game summary

| Quarter | 1 | 2 | 3 | 4 | Total |
|---|---|---|---|---|---|
| Chargers | 0 | 6 | 3 | 0 | **9** |
| Seahawks | 7 | 3 | 0 | 10 | **20** |

at Kingdome, Seattle, Washington

- Date: October 27
- Game time: 1:00 p.m. PST
- Game weather: N/A (game played indoors)
- Game attendance: 58,025
- Referee: Bernie Kukar
- TV announcers (NBC): Charlie Jones and Todd Christensen
- Box score

Game information

**First quarter**

- SEA – Derrick Fenner 1-yard run (John Kasay kick), 8:18. Seahawks 7–0. **Drive: 8 plays, 56 yards, 5:13.**

**Second quarter**

- SDG – John Carney 29-yard field goal, 12:13. Seahawks 7–3. **Drive: 12 plays, 69 yards, 6:43.**
- SEA – John Kasay 51-yard field goal, 9:10. Seahawks 10–3. **Drive: 5 plays, 25 yards, 3:03.**
- SDG – John Carney 24-yard field goal, 0:04. Seahawks 10–6. **Drive: 11 plays, 59 yards, 1:28.**

**Third quarter**

- SDG – John Carney 36-yard field goal, 0:19. Seahawks 10–9. **Drive: 11 plays, 46 yards, 5:22.**

**Fourth quarter**

- SEA – Mike Tice 5-yard pass from Dave Krieg (John Kasay kick), 11:24. Seahawks 17–9. **Drive: 7 plays, 40 yards, 3:55.**
- SEA – John Kasay 54-yard field goal, 6:05. Seahawks 20–9. **Drive: 8 plays, 33 yards, 3:42.**

**Top passers**

- SDG – John Friesz – 27/41, 212 yards
- SEA – Dave Krieg – 13/21, 142 yards, TD, 2 INT

**Top rushers**

- SDG – Marion Butts – 23 rushes, 76 yards
- SEA – John L. Williams – 18 rushes, 66 yards

**Top receivers**

- SDG – Anthony Miller – 8 receptions, 89 yards
- SEA – Tommy Kane – 5 receptions, 53 yards

The Chargers were kept out of the end zone as they slipped to 1–8. They went three-and-out on their opening possession, and Seattle drove 56 yards for a touchdown, taking a lead they kept for the rest of the game. San Diego pulled three points back early in the 2nd quarter, when Miller drew a 37-yard pass interference penalty, negating an interception and moving the ball to the Seattle 11. They were unable to get any closer to the end zone, and Carney kicked a 29-yard field goal; barely three minutes later, Seattle kicker John Kasay hit a 51-yarder to restore his team's seven-point lead. The Seahawks drove to the Charger 28 on their next possession, but Gill Byrd stopped the threat with an interception near the goal line. San Diego also missed a chance on the ensuing drive, Butts being thrown for a loss on 4th and 2 at the Seattle 42. On their next possession, Harmon's 26-yard reception on 4th and 11 moved the ball to the Seattle 12, setting up another Carney field goal with four seconds remaining in the half.

Carney was short from 56 yards early in the 3rd quarter (Henning mistakenly believed the kick would be a 51-yarder), and Seattle drove to the Charger 29 before Billy Ray Smith intercepted Dave Krieg. San Diego moved back into Seattle territory, this time passing on a long field goal and going for it on 4th and 1 from the Seattle 36. Butts converted with a 14-yard run off right tackle, setting up another field goal and pulling the Chargers within a point at 10–9. Seattle running back Chris Warren ran the ensuing kickoff back 55 yards to the Charger 40. Gill Byrd forced a fumble on the next play, but Seattle recovered, and scored six plays later on a pass from Krieg to Mike Tice. Following a Charger three-and-out, Seattle added another long Kasey field goal, this one from 54 yards out. Needing two touchdowns in the final six minutes of the game, San Diego drove from their own 20 to the Seattle 3, from where Friesz threw incomplete on 4th and goal. Seattle saw out the remaining two minutes without difficulty.

San Diego lost despite clear advantages in rushing yardage (128 to 75) and passing yardage (192 to 127).

==== Week 11: vs. Seattle Seahawks ====
Week Eleven: Seattle Seahawks at San Diego Chargers – Game summary

| Quarter | 1 | 2 | 3 | 4 | Total |
|---|---|---|---|---|---|
| Seahawks | 0 | 0 | 0 | 14 | **14** |
| Chargers | 7 | 7 | 0 | 3 | **17** |

at Jack Murphy Stadium, San Diego, California

- Date: November 10
- Game time: 1:00 p.m. PST
- Game weather: 63 °F (17.2 °C), relative humidity 71%, wind 9 miles per hour (14 km/h; 7.8 kn)
- Game attendance: 43,597
- Referee: Dick Hantak
- TV announcers (NBC): Jim Donovan and Beasley Reece
- Box score

Game information

**First quarter**

- SDG – Marion Butts 17-yard run (John Carney kick), 9:11. Chargers 7–0. **Drive: 6 plays, 75 yards, 3:29.**

**Second quarter**

- SDG – Marion Butts 1-yard run (John Carney kick), 9:16. Chargers 14–0. **Drive: 6 plays, 67 yards, 3:36.**

**Third quarter**

- No scoring plays.

**Fourth quarter**

- SEA – John L. Williams 13-yard pass from Dave Krieg (John Kasay kick), 14:07. Chargers 14–7. **Drive: 5 plays, 80 yards, 2:10.**
- SEA – Jeff Chadwick 20-yard pass from Dave Krieg (John Kasay kick), 5:09. Tied 14–14. **Drive: 5 plays, 69 yards, 1:39.**
- SDG – John Carney 54-yard field goal, 0:18. Chargers 17–14. **Drive: 4 plays, -3 yards, 1:17.**

**Top passers**

- SEA – Dave Krieg – 29/39, 379 yards, 2 TD, INT
- SDG – John Friesz – 17/25, 229 yards

**Top rushers**

- SEA – James Jones – 4 rushes, 22 yards
- SDG – Marion Butts – 20 rushes, 86 yards, 2 TD

**Top receivers**

- SEA – Brian Blades – 8 receptions, 131 yards
- SDG – Anthony Miller – 5 receptions, 124 yards

John Carney hit a club-record 54-yard field goal to give San Diego their second win of the season. The Chargers started well, forcing a punt and going 75 yards in six plays to take the lead. Friesz completed passes of 24 yards to Miller and 20 yards to Hendrickson, and Butts swept left for a 17-yard touchdown run. Early in the 2nd quarter, Martin Bayless forced a fumble that Gary Plummer recovered at the San Diego 33. Two plays later, Miller took a mid-range pass for a 58-yard gain to the Seattle 9, setting up another Butts touchdown, this time from a yard out. The Seahawks threatened to get on the scoreboard shortly before halftime, reaching a 1st and goal at the 4. Smith then forced John L. Williams to fumble, and Grossman recovered to leave the Chargers 14–0 up at the break.

There was no scoring in the 3rd quarter. Late in the period, Seattle began an 80-yard drive, culminating in a touchdown pass from Dave Krieg to Williams with 14 minutes to play. After the next three possessions ended in punts, the Seahawks tied the score. Krieg converted a 3rd and 19 with a 24-yard completion and threw his second touchdown pass on the next play. Friesz responded with a 29-yard completion to McEwen, taking the ball to midfield. Though the Chargers were then forced to punt, they pinned the Seahawks at their own 16 with 2:10 to play. Following back-to-back sacks by Donnie Elder and Anthony Shelton, Seattle was forced to punt from their own 5. Kitrick Taylor's 29-yard punt return set the Chargers up at the Seattle 33 with 1:35 to play. Initially, the Chargers went backward, with penalties on Hendrickson and Moten costing them 15 yards. Harmon recovered 12 of those yards with a pair of receptions, and Carney made his winning kick with 18 seconds left. Byrd intercepted Krieg's deep throw as time expired.

Miller finished with 5 catches for 128 yards. The three-point victory ended a run of ten straight defeats for the Chargers in games decided by seven points or fewer.

==== Week 12: vs. New Orleans Saints ====
Week Twelve: New Orleans Saints at San Diego Chargers – Game summary

| Quarter | 1 | 2 | 3 | 4 | Total |
|---|---|---|---|---|---|
| Saints | 7 | 14 | 0 | 0 | **21** |
| Chargers | 7 | 7 | 0 | 10 | **24** |

at Jack Murphy Stadium, San Diego, California

- Date: November 17
- Game time: 1:00 p.m. PST
- Game weather: 58 °F (14.4 °C), relative humidity 69%, wind 9 miles per hour (14 km/h; 7.8 kn)
- Game attendance: 48,420
- Referee: Red Cashion
- TV announcers (CBS): Sean McDonough and Dave Jennings
- Box score

Game information

**First quarter**

- NO – Buford Jordan 1-yard pass from Steve Walsh (Morten Andersen kick), 7:22. Saints 7–0. **Drive: 12 plays, 78 yards, 7:38.**
- SDG – Steve Hendrickson 3-yard run (John Carney kick), 2:48. Tied 7–7. **Drive: 9 plays, 80 yards, 4:34.**

**Second quarter**

- NO – Frank Warren 37-yard blocked punt return (Morten Andersen kick), 8:08. Saints 14–7.
- SDG – Nate Lewis 95-yard kickoff return (John Carney kick), 7:52. Tied 14–14.
- NO – Quinn Early 38-yard pass from Steve Walsh (Morten Andersen kick), 3:00. Saints 21–14. **Drive: 7 plays, 77 yards, 4:52.**

**Third quarter**

- No scoring plays.

**Fourth quarter**

- SDG – Marion Butts 5-yard run (John Carney kick), 3:04. Tied 21–21. **Drive: 11 plays, 63 yards, 3:27.**
- SDG – John Carney 19-yard field goal, 0:05. Chargers 24–21. **Drive: 7 plays, 70 yards, 1:31.**

**Top passers**

- NO – Steve Walsh – 21/34, 203 yards, 2 TD, INT
- SDG – John Friesz – 16/30, 175 yards, INT

**Top rushers**

- NO – Fred McAfee – 8 rushes, 45 yards
- SDG – Marion Butts – 15 rushes, 92 yards, TD

**Top receivers**

- NO – Eric Martin – 4 receptions, 50 yards
- SDG – Nate Lewis – 2 receptions, 38 yards

Carney again kicked a late game-winner, as San Diego earned a shock win over the Saints. New Orleans, 9–1 coming into the game, drove 78 yards in 12 plays after receiving the opening kickoff, taking over seven minutes off the clock and scoring on a short touchdown pass by Steve Walsh. The Chargers' reply began at their own 20 yard line. Butts opened the drive with back-to-back carries of 9 and 33 yards. After the next three plays gained only four yards, Friesz connected with Harmon for 8 yards on 4th and 6 to retain possession. Two plays later, Butts swept for 17 yards down to the Saints' 3, and Hendrickson went in for the touchdown on the next play.

In the 2nd quarter, Bayless tipped a Walsh pass, and Smith intercepted, setting San Diego up near midfield. Lewis then caught a 25-yard pass, but a pair of sacks knocked the Chargers back out of field goal range. John Kidd came in to punt, but his kick was blocked and ran back 37 yards for a touchdown. From the ensuing kickoff, Lewis angled through a large hole to the right, and completed a 95-yard touchdown return without being touched. New Orleans went back in front on their next drive, Walsh finding ex-Charger Quinn Early for a touchdown and a 21–14 lead. Butts lost a fumble on the next play, but the defense held and Morten Andersen missed a 39-yard field goal. An interception that was thrown by Friesz shortly afterward also led to no further points.

Defenses took control in the second half, as the first seven drives featured seven punts and only two first downs. Smith recovered a fumble in Saints' territory early in the final quarter, but the Chargers turned the ball back over when Friesz threw incomplete on 4th and 2 from the 25. New Orleans then crossed midfield, but lost another fumble, this time forced by Sam Seale, recovered by Bayless and lateraled to Byrd, who returned the ball to the Charger 37 with 6:31 to play. Friesz completed 6 of 8 passes for 48 yards on the ensuing drive, and Butts tied the score from the 5 after fighting through tacklers on the goal line. New Orleans was forced to punt after picking up a single first down, and San Diego took over on their own 29 yard line, with 1:36 to work with. Harmon had a 15-yard run on a draw, and Friesz completed passes of 13 yards to Lewis and 29 yards to Chris Samuels, the latter moving the ball to the 1 yard line. Carney kicked a 19-yard chip shot on the next play, with five seconds remaining, and Hendrickson recovered a fumble on the ensuing kickoff to clinch the win.

The key reception by Samuels was one of only two during his single season in the NFL.

==== Week 13: at New York Jets ====
Week Thirteen: San Diego Chargers at New York Jets – Game summary

| Quarter | 1 | 2 | 3 | 4 | Total |
|---|---|---|---|---|---|
| Chargers | 0 | 3 | 0 | 0 | **3** |
| Jets | 14 | 0 | 3 | 7 | **24** |

at Giants Stadium, New York, New York

- Date: November 24
- Game time: 1:00 p.m. EST
- Game weather: 54 °F (12.2 °C), relative humidity 88%, wind 15 miles per hour (24 km/h; 13 kn)
- Game attendance: 59,025
- Referee: Johnny Grier
- TV announcers (NBC): Marv Albert and Paul Maguire
- Box score

Game information

**First quarter**

- NYJ – Rob Moore 6-yard pass from Ken O'Brien (Pat Leahy kick), 13:15. Jets 7–0. **Drive: 3 plays, 29 yards, 1:37.**
- NYJ – Blair Thomas 1-yard run (Pat Leahy kick), 5:54. Jets 14–0. **Drive: 7 plays, 76 yards, 3:59.**

**Second quarter**

- SDG – John Carney 53-yard field goal, 6:41. Jets 14–3. **Drive: 10 plays, 55 yards, 6:54.**

**Third quarter**

- NYJ – Pat Leahy 28-yard field goal, 5:19. Jets 17–3. **Drive: 14 plays, 87 yards, 6:43.**

**Fourth quarter**

- NYJ – Blair Thomas 22-yard run (Pat Leahy kick), 14:54. Jets 24–3. **Drive: 1 play, 22 yards, 0:06.**

**Top passers**

- SDG – Bob Gagliano – 9/22, 76 yards, INT
- NYJ – Ken O'Brien – 16/30, 175 yards, TD, INT

**Top rushers**

- SDG – Ronnie Harmon – 10 rushes, 70 yards
- NYJ – Blair Thomas – 15 rushes, 76 yards, 2 TD

**Top receivers**

- SDG – Ronnie Harmon – 6 receptions, 39 yards
- NYJ – Rob Moore – 6 receptions, 74 yards, TD

An early turnover and two key injuries led to a one-sided defeat for the Chargers. The game's opening kickoff was short; Mitchell Benson, a defensive lineman who usually blocked on kick returns, fielded the ball at his own 24 but fumbled, with the Jets recovering. On the first play of the ensuing drive, Gill Byrd went out for the game with an ankle injury; on the fourth play, Ken O'Brien's touchdown pass put the Jets ahead to stay, 97 seconds into the game. New York forced a punt and drove 76 yards on their second drive to make it 14–0, and Friesz was also intercepted before the opening quarter ended. San Diego did manage to score in the 2nd quarter after being pinned at their own 10. Butts had back-to-back carries of 23 and 12 yards to start the drive, and Harmon took a screen pass for 11 yards on 3rd and 11 before Carney made a 53-yard field goal. Friesz, however, injured his ankle while being sacked towards the end of the drive, and did not return after Carney's kick. Elder thwarted the Jets with an end-zone interception on 3rd and goal from the 7, but New York led 14–3 at halftime.

With Bob Gagliano in at quarterback, the Chargers carried little threat in the second half. After a Jets field goal, they did manage to move from their own 25 to the New York 28; this was the furthest they penetrated into New York territory all game, but Carney missed a field goal to end the drive. A Gagliano interception later set up the Jets' third touchdown; in the final quarter, he lost a fumble and twice threw incomplete on fourth down.

San Diego had 186 yards on the ground (Harmon led the team with 70), but only 105 through the air. Gagliano was 9 of 22 for 76 yards and an interception while being sacked three times for a loss of 22 yards.

==== Week 14: vs. Los Angeles Raiders ====
Week Fourteen: Los Angeles Raiders at San Diego Chargers – Game summary

| Quarter | 1 | 2 | 3 | 4 | Total |
|---|---|---|---|---|---|
| Raiders | 3 | 6 | 0 | 0 | **9** |
| Chargers | 0 | 0 | 7 | 0 | **7** |

at Jack Murphy Stadium, San Diego, California

- Date: December 1
- Game time: 5:00 p.m. PST
- Game weather: 53 °F (11.7 °C), relative humidity 25%, wind 10 miles per hour (16 km/h; 8.7 kn)
- Game attendance: 56,780
- Referee: Larry Nemmers
- TV announcers (ESPN): Mike Patrick and Joe Theismann
- Box score

Game information

**First quarter**

- RAI – Jeff Jaeger 37-yard field goal, 3:06. Raiders 3–0. **Drive: 10 plays, 36 yards, 5:48.**

**Second quarter**

- RAI – Jeff Jaeger 19-yard field goal, 12:47. Raiders 6–0. **Drive: 10 plays, 72 yards, 3:35.**
- RAI – Jeff Jaeger 53-yard field goal, 0:08. Raiders 9–0. **Drive: 11 plays, 45 yards, 2:47.**

**Third quarter**

- SDG – Rod Bernstine 1-yard run (John Carney kick), 5:14. Raiders 9–7. **Drive: 7 plays, 89 yards, 2:58.**

**Fourth quarter**

- No scoring plays.

**Top passers**

- RAI – Jay Schroeder – 12/28, 122 yards, 3 INT
- SDG – John Friesz – 12/27, 150 yards, INT

**Top rushers**

- RAI – Nick Bell – 10 rushes, 58 yards
- SDG – Marion Butts – 16 rushes, 44 yards

**Top receivers**

- RAI – Tim Brown – 4 receptions, 54 yards
- SDG – Kitrick Taylor – 6 receptions, 60 yards

A weak offensive performance set up another defeat for the Chargers. Their defense played well, starting on the game's opening play when Darren Carrington intercepted Raider quarterback Jay Schroeder. Three runs by Butts earned San Diego a first down, but he lost a fumble two plays later. The Chargers gained no further first downs throughout the first half; the Raiders had numerous scoring threats, though they managed only three field goals by Jeff Jaeger. Martin Bayless and Henry Rolling stopped drives with further interceptions, and Seau stopped Marcus Allen on a 3rd and goal from the 1 before the second Jaeger field goal. By halftime, the Raiders had a 190–5 advantage in total yardage. Friesz, who had recovered sufficiently from his ankle injury to start the game, had completed none of his eight passes.

The offensive improved in the 3rd quarter. Butts was stopped on fourth down on their first possession, but they drove 89 yards for a touchdown the next time they had the ball. Kitrick Taylor drew a 37-yard pass interference penalty to move into Raider territory, Lewis caught a 32-yard pass on 3rd and 4 to bring up 1st and goal from the 1, and Bernstine scored from there two plays later, closing the deficit to 9–7. Early in the final quarter, McEwen had a 30-yard reception, and Butts converted a 4th and 1 at the Raider 46 with a 5-yard carry. Harmon lost a fumble on the next play to end that drive. After forcing a punt, the Chargers took over at their own 13 with 7:22 to play. Taylor had 5 receptions for 54 yards on the ensuing drive, and Derrick Walker appeared to have caught a 22-yard touchdown. A holding penalty on Courtney Hall wiped out that score, and Carney's 44-yard field goal was blocked with 1:57 to play. The final Charger drive began at their own 6 yard line with only 23 seconds to play, and ended with an interception.

San Diego were outrushed for the first time since Week 1, by 161 yards to 75. Friesz improved somewhat after his bad start, finishing 12 of 27 for 150 yards and an interception.

==== Week 15: at Kansas City Chiefs ====
Week Fifteen: San Diego Chargers at Kansas City Chiefs – Game summary

| Quarter | 1 | 2 | 3 | 4 | OT | Total |
|---|---|---|---|---|---|---|
| Chargers | 0 | 14 | 0 | 3 | 0 | **17** |
| Chiefs | 0 | 0 | 10 | 7 | 3 | **20** |

at Arrowhead Stadium, Kansas City, Missouri

- Date: December 8
- Game time: 12:00 p.m. CST
- Game weather: 54 °F (12.2 °C), relative humidity 88%, wind 15 miles per hour (24 km/h; 13 kn)
- Game attendance: 73,330
- Referee: Gordon McCarter
- TV announcers (NBC): Tom Hammond and Joe Namath
- Box score

Game information

**First quarter**

- No scoring plays.

**Second quarter**

- SDG – Nate Lewis 6-yard pass from John Friesz (John Carney kick), 14:23. Chargers 7–0. **Drive: 18 plays, 80 yards, 11:52.**
- SDG – Donald Frank 71-yard interception return (John Carney kick), 9:34. Chargers 14–0.

**Third quarter**

- KAN – Nick Lowery 29-yard field goal, 5:31. Chargers 14–3. **Drive: 12 plays, 71 yards, 6:10.**
- KAN – Barry Word 1-yard run (Nick Lowery kick), 3:44. Chargers 14–10. **Drive: 1 play, 1 yard, 0:04.**

**Fourth quarter**

- KAN – Harvey Williams 16-yard pass from Mark Vlasic (Nick Lowery kick), 3:00. Chiefs 17–14. **Drive: 4 plays, 70 yards, 1:39.**
- SDG – John Carney 27-yard field goal, 0:11. Tied 17–17. **Drive: 13 plays, 57 yards, 2:49.**

**Overtime**

- KAN – Nick Lowery 18-yard field goal, 3:34. Chiefs 20–17. **Drive: 3 plays, 29 yards, 1:11.**

**Top passers**

- SDG – John Friesz – 19/37, 208 yards, TD, INT
- KAN – Mark Vlasic – 12/18, 150 yards, TD

**Top rushers**

- SDG – Marion Butts – 20 rushes, 77 yards
- KAN – Barry Word – 14 rushes, 66 yards, TD

**Top receivers**

- SDG – Nate Lewis – 6 receptions, 79 yards, TD
- KAN – Emile Harry – 5 receptions, 73 yards

The Chargers lost a fourteen-point lead en route to their second overtime loss of the season. After forcing the Chiefs to punt on their first possession, San Diego put together an 18-play, 80-yard touchdown drive that took 11:52 off the clock. Friesz converted a pair of third downs with completions to Bernstine and Taylor, and Bernstine twice rushed for 2 yards on 4th and 1. Friesz finished the drive with a 6-yard touchdown pass to Lewis, two plays into the 2nd quarter. The Chiefs drove as far as the Chargers 32 in response, but Donald Frank intercepted a sideline pass by Steve DeBerg, returning the ball untouched for a 71-yard touchdown. Late in the half, Carrington ended another Kansas City threat with an interception, and the Chargers led 14–0 at the interval.

Former Charger Mark Vlasic replaced DeBerg for the second half. His first drive went 71 yards and ended in a field goal. Three plays later, Friesz fumbled, and Derrick Thomas recovered at the Charger 1, setting up a touchdown on the next play. San Diego drove into Chiefs territory on their next two possessions, but were foiled by an interception and Carney's missed 47-yard field goal. After the second of these, Kansas City went 70 yards in only 4 plays, taking the lead on Vlasic's touchdown pass to Harvey Williams with 3:00 to play. Friesz and Lewis connected on completions of 16 and 14 yards, both times converting third downs, and Carney sent the game into overtime with a 27-yard field goal, eleven seconds from time.

Kansas City took the overtime kickoff and punted, pinning the Chargers at their own 4. Friesz completions of 15 and 16 yards helped San Diego get as far as their 40 before they too were forced to punt. The Chiefs crossed midfield before having to punt again - this time, they pinned the Chargers at their own 1. San Diego failed to gain any yards in three plays and had to kick again, with Kansas City taking over only 30 yards from the end zone. Two plays later, a 28-yard run by Barry Word set up Nick Lowery's 18-yard chip shot to win the game.

San Diego had slightly more first downs (23–21) and yards (366–349) but committed 14 penalties for 117 yards.

==== Week 16: vs. Miami Dolphins ====
Week Sixteen: Miami Dolphins at San Diego Chargers – Game summary

| Quarter | 1 | 2 | 3 | 4 | Total |
|---|---|---|---|---|---|
| Dolphins | 3 | 7 | 13 | 7 | **30** |
| Chargers | 0 | 10 | 0 | 28 | **38** |

at Jack Murphy Stadium, San Diego, California

- Date: December 15
- Game time: 1:00 p.m. PST
- Game weather: 60 °F (15.6 °C), relative humidity 47%, wind 8 miles per hour (13 km/h; 7.0 kn)
- Game attendance: 47,731
- Referee: Gerry Austin
- TV announcers (NBC): Charlie Jones and Todd Christensen
- Box score

Game information

**First quarter**

- MIA – Pete Stoyanovich 34-yard field goal, 8:15. Dolphins 3–0. **Drive: 13 plays, 57 yards, 6:45.**

**Second quarter**

- SDG – John Carney 35-yard field goal, 12:34. Tied 3–3. **Drive: 13 plays, 62 yards, 6:12.**
- MIA – Dan Marino 10-yard run (Pete Stoyanovich kick), 6:01. Dolphins 10–3. **Drive: 11 plays, 80 yards, 6:33.**
- SDG – Craig McEwen 12-yard pass from John Friesz (John Carney kick), 0:21. Tied 10–10. **Drive: 13 plays, 75 yards, 5:40.**

**Third quarter**

- MIA – Tony Paige 9-yard pass from Dan Marino (kick failed), 5:55. Dolphins 16–10. **Drive: 9 plays, 59 yards, 5:42.**
- MIA – Mark Clayton 10-yard pass from Dan Marino (Pete Stoyanovich kick), 1:48. Dolphins 23–10. **Drive: 5 plays, 39 yards, 2:54.**

**Fourth quarter**

- SDG – Ronnie Harmon 25-yard pass from John Friesz (John Carney kick), 12:46. Dolphins 23–17. **Drive: 7 plays, 60 yards, 4:02.**
- SDG – Rod Bernstine 5-yard run (John Carney kick), 11:06. Chargers 24–23. **Drive: 3 plays, 13 yards, 1:22.**
- SDG – Rod Bernstine 1-yard run (John Carney kick), 4:29. Chargers 31–23. **Drive: 8 plays, 43 yards, 5:30.**
- MIA – Mark Clayton 8-yard pass from Dan Marino (Pete Stoyanovich kick), 2:37. Chargers 31–30. **Drive: 8 plays, 73 yards, 1:52.**
- SDG – Rod Bernstine 63-yard run (John Carney kick), 1:38. Chargers 38–30. **Drive: 4 plays, 79 yards, 0:59.**

**Top passers**

- MIA – Dan Marino – 26/41, 286 yards, 3 TD, INT
- SDG – John Friesz – 17/25, 185 yards, 2 TD

**Top rushers**

- MIA – Mark Higgs – 17 rushes, 63 yards
- SDG – Rod Bernstine – 13 rushes, 104 yards, 3 TD

**Top receivers**

- MIA – Mark Duper – 8 receptions, 106 yards
- SDG – Craig McEwen – 5 receptions, 54 yards, TD

Rod Bernstine scored three of the Chargers' four 4th quarter touchdowns in a come-from-behind win over Miami. Following an exchange of field goals, Miami went 10–3 up with under six minutes to play in the first half, Dan Marino rounding off an 80-yard drive by running 10 yards for a touchdown on 3rd and goal. The Chargers responded with a 13-play, 75-yard drive. Friesz converted a pair of third downs with pass completions, and Bernstine gained 3 yards on 4th and 1 to reach the Miami 36. Friesz fumbled while being sacked on the next play, but Courtney Hall recovered for a loss of 9. Harmon then slipped through multiple tackles on a draw play, gaining 33 yards to the 12, from where Friesz found McEwen open in the end zone, tying the score with 21 seconds to play.

Marino dominated the 3rd quarter, completing 7 of 7 on two drives, and finishing both with touchdown passes. Pete Stoyanovich missed the extra point after the first of these, so the Dolphins led 23–10. Friesz responded with a 25-yard touchdown pass to Harmon early in the final quarter. On the next play from scrimmage, Leslie O'Neal broke through on Marino's blindside to sack the quarterback, forcing a fumble that Joe Phillips recovered on the Miami 13. On 3rd and 2 from the 5, Bernstine went up the middle for a touchdown, and the first Charger lead. Three plays later, Richard intercepted Marino and returned the ball to the Dolphin 43. Friesz converted a 3rd and 19 with a 29-yard completion to Jefferson, and Bernstine scored his second touchdown on 3rd and goal from the 1. Marino led a quick touchdown drive to draw his team within a point with 2:37 left. Four plays later Bernstine swept left and went 63 yards untouched for the clinching score, benefitting from a key block at the line by Derrick Walker.

Bernstine had 13 carries for 104 yards and three touchdowns. The 28 4th-quarter points tied a club record set in 1966, also against the Dolphins.

==== Week 17: vs. Denver Broncos ====
Week Seventeen: Denver Broncos at San Diego Chargers – Game summary

| Quarter | 1 | 2 | 3 | 4 | Total |
|---|---|---|---|---|---|
| Broncos | 3 | 7 | 0 | 7 | **17** |
| Chargers | 0 | 7 | 0 | 7 | **14** |

at Jack Murphy Stadium, San Diego, California

- Date: December 22
- Game time: 1:00 p.m. PST
- Game weather: 57 °F (13.9 °C), relative humidity 55%, wind 6 miles per hour (9.7 km/h; 5.2 kn)
- Game attendance: 51,449
- Referee: Tom Dooley
- TV announcers (NBC): Charlie Jones and Todd Christensen
- Box score

Game information

**First quarter**

- DEN – David Treadwell 34-yard field goal, 5:24. Broncos 3–0. **Drive: 8 plays, 18 yards, 2:46.**

**Second quarter**

- DEN – Steve Sewell 2-yard run (David Treadwell kick), 11:27. Broncos 10–0. **Drive: 6 plays, 26 yards, 2:32.**
- SDG – Craig McEwen 1-yard pass from John Friesz (John Carney kick), 0:47. Broncos 10–7. **Drive: 11 plays, 82 yards, 3:24.**

**Third quarter**

- No scoring plays.

**Fourth quarter**

- DEN – Greg Lewis 2-yard run (David Treadwell kick), 14:18. Broncos 17–7. **Drive: 10 plays, 76 yards, 5:40.**
- SDG – Rod Bernstine 1-yard run (John Carney kick), 10:25. Broncos 17–14. **Drive: 9 plays, 62 yards, 3:53.**

**Top passers**

- DEN – John Elway – 14/32, 196 yards, INT
- SDG – John Friesz – 12/34, 123 yards, TD, 3 INT

**Top rushers**

- DEN – Gaston Green – 25 rushes, 90 yards
- SDG – Ronnie Harmon – 5 rushes, 47 yards

**Top receivers**

- DEN – Mike Young – 4 receptions, 80 yards
- SDG – Kitrick Taylor – 4 receptions, 56 yards

San Diego ended their season with another close loss. They failed to pick up a first down on their first six possessions of the game, while a Taylor fumble and a Friesz interception set up 10 points for Denver. In the final stages of the half, they did manage to put together a long drive, going 82 yards in 11 plays for a touchdown. Harmon's 21-yard run and Taylor's 18-yard reception on 3rd and 15 were the longest gains, and McEwen caught a 1-yard touchdown pass in what would prove to be his final NFL game.

After a scoreless 3rd quarter, Denver scored their second touchdown early in the 4th, taking a 17–7 lead. The Chargers responded immediately, Harmon (with a 16-yard carry) and Taylor (with a 19-yard reception), again had the biggest gains, before Bernstine scored on 3rd and goal from the 1 to pull the deficit back down to three points with 10:25 to play. San Diego had three further possessions but failed to cross midfield on any of them, punting once before Friesz threw two interceptions.

Leslie O'Neal had four of five Charger sacks. John Friesz completed 12 of 34 passes, for 123 yards, with a touchdown and three interceptions. This gave him a passer rating of 19.6, which would stand as his worst through 38 career starts.

=== Standings ===
AFC West
| | W | L | T | PCT | DIV | CONF | PF | PA | STK |
|---|---|---|---|---|---|---|---|---|---|
| ^{(2)} Denver Broncos | 12 | 4 | 0 | .750 | 5–3 | 10–4 | 304 | 235 | W4 |
| ^{(4)} Kansas City Chiefs | 10 | 6 | 0 | .625 | 6–2 | 8–4 | 322 | 252 | W1 |
| ^{(5)} Los Angeles Raiders | 9 | 7 | 0 | .563 | 5–3 | 7–5 | 298 | 297 | L3 |
| Seattle Seahawks | 7 | 9 | 0 | .438 | 2–6 | 6–6 | 276 | 261 | W1 |
| San Diego Chargers | 4 | 12 | 0 | .250 | 2–6 | 3–9 | 274 | 342 | L1 |

== Awards ==
Three Chargers were named to the 1992 Pro Bowl. Also, Richard received a single vote as Defensive Rookie of the Year.

| Player | Position | Pro Bowl starter | Pro Bowl reserve | NEA 1st team All-Pro |
|---|---|---|---|---|
| Marion Butts | Running back | | Yes | |
| Gill Byrd | Cornerback | Yes | | |
| Junior Seau | Linebacker | | Yes | Yes |
