= List of Los Angeles Chargers starting quarterbacks =

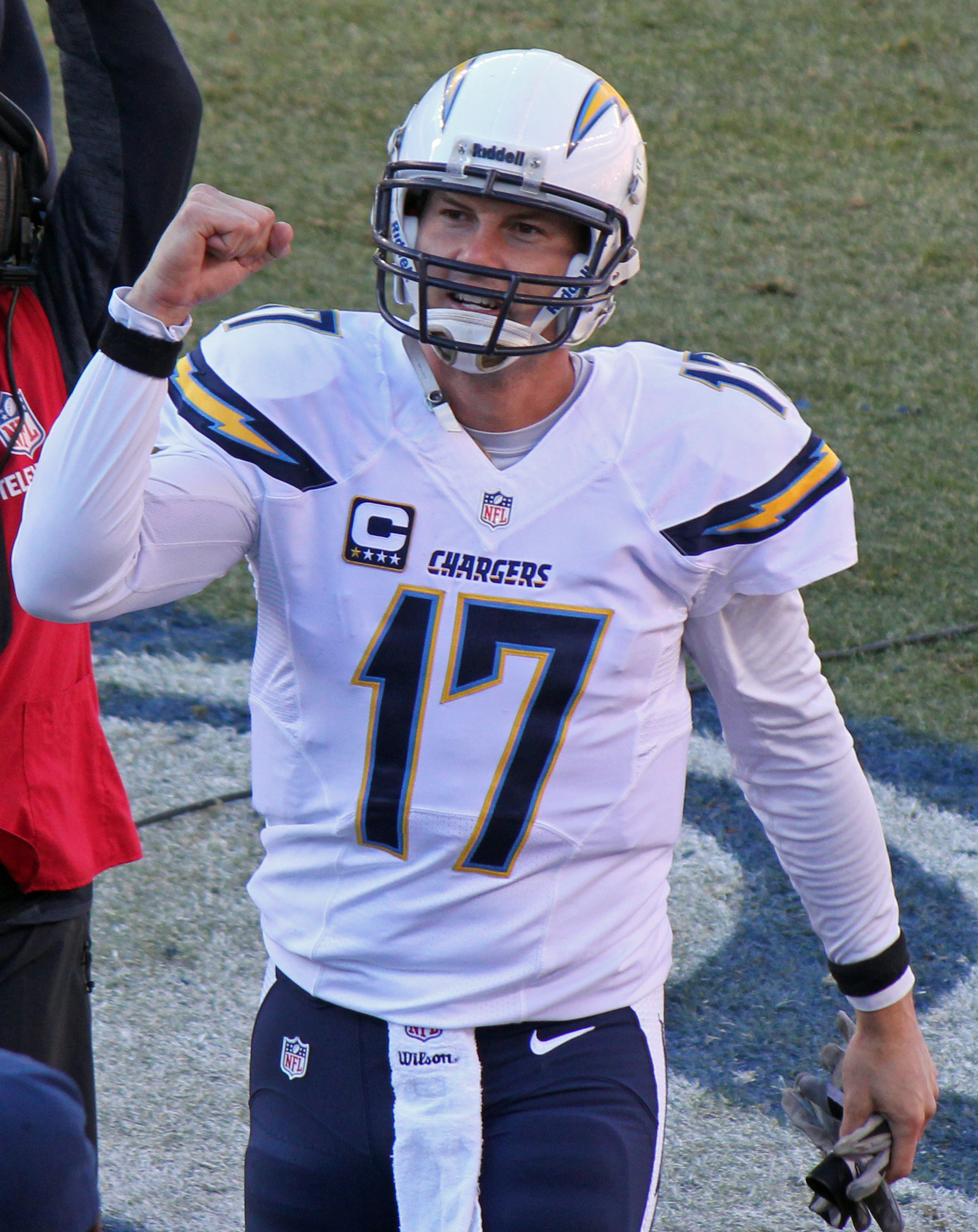
Between 2006 and 2019 Philip Rivers started in 224 regular season games and 11 postseason games, both Charger records.

The Los Angeles Chargers are an American football franchise who play in the National Football League (NFL). They began play in Los Angeles in 1960 as charter members of the American Football League (AFL), switched cities to San Diego the following season, and returned to the Greater Los Angeles area in 2017. The AFL was formed as rivals to the established NFL, though the leagues would later merge, with all AFL teams including the Chargers officially joining the NFL in 1970.

Through the 2025 season, 45 different players have started at least one regular season game at quarterback for the Chargers. Of these, 16 have started at least 10 games, and three (John Hadl, Dan Fouts and Philip Rivers) have started at least 100 games. Rivers holds the franchise records for both starts and wins, as well as in the statistical categories of touchdown passes, pass completions and yards gained by passing. Tobin Rote is the only Charger to start during a title game victory, having done so in the 1963 AFL Championship game.

== Summary by year ==
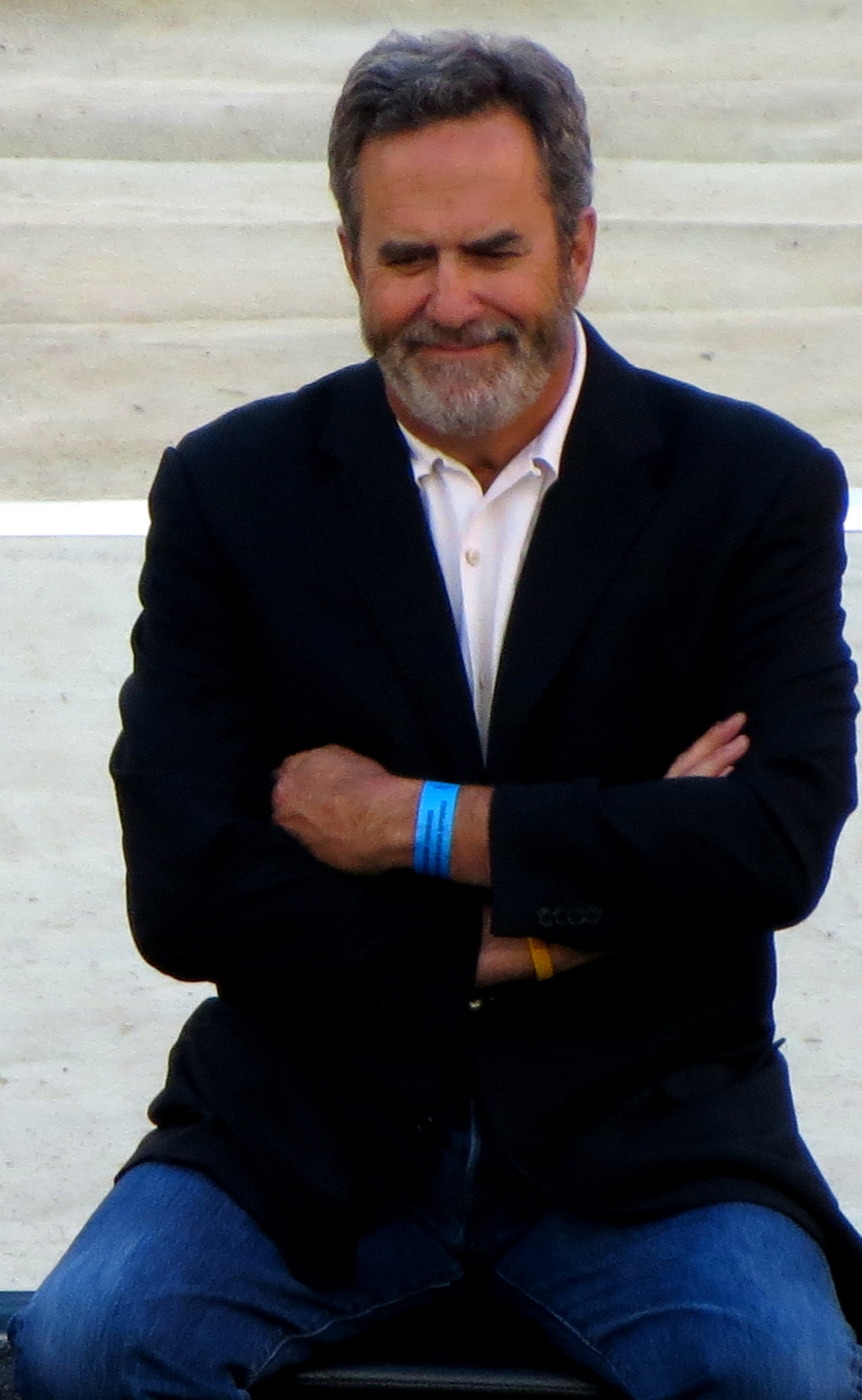
Dan Fouts started for the Chargers in 15 different seasons (1973–1987).

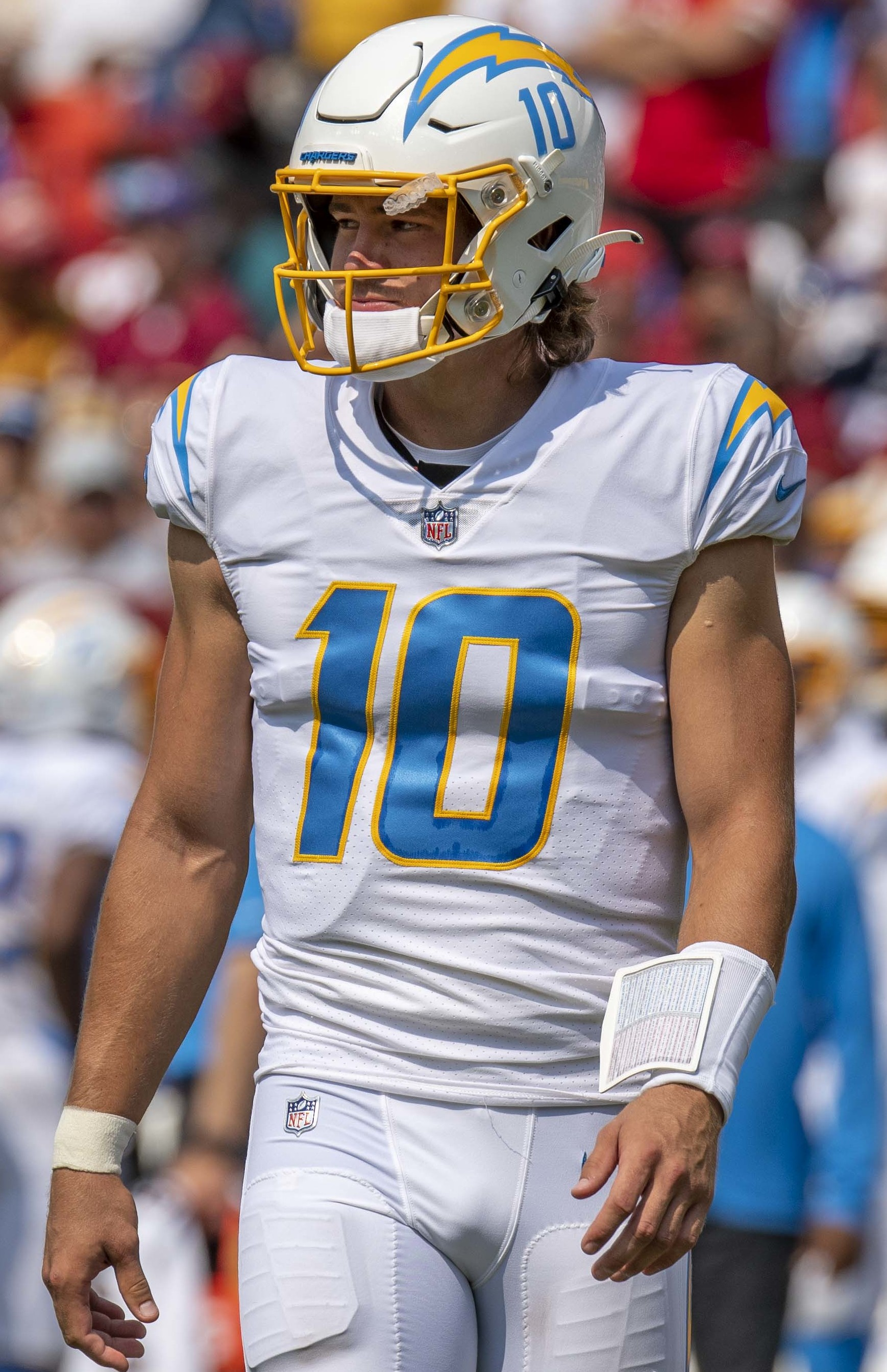
Justin Herbert has been the team's starter since 2020.

The bracketed figures to the right of each name show their record as a starter that season: (wins–losses) or (wins–losses–ties).

=== Regular season ===
Charger starters by season
Season(s)	Quarterback(s)	Notes	Ref
1960	Jack Kemp (9–3) / Bob Clatterbuck (1–1)	Clatterbuck started in Weeks 4–5 due to a Kemp shoulder injury.	
1961	Jack Kemp (12–2)		
1962	Jack Kemp (1–1) / John Hadl (1–9) / Dick Wood (2–0)	Kemp was waived after breaking his finger in Week 2. Wood and Hadl split time until Week 8, after which Wood was waived.	
1963	Tobin Rote (11–3)	Rote, a free agent signing, was named the starter ahead of Hadl due to his greater experience.	
1964	John Hadl (6–2) / Tobin Rote (2–3–1)	Hadl was named the starter after replacing Rote early in the Week 5 game and playing well. Rote started one more game in Week 14, intended as a farewell game before retirement.	
1965	John Hadl (9–2–3)		
1966	John Hadl (7–4–1) / Steve Tensi (0–2)	Tensi was twice named the starter after playing well in relief. He started in Week 6 and Week 13, but struggled and Hadl replaced him during both games, resuming the starting role each time.	
1967	John Hadl (8–5–1)		
1968	John Hadl (9–5)		
1969	John Hadl (5–5) / Marty Domres (3–1)	Domres started in Week 9 (due to a Hadl elbow injury) and 11–13 (to test his abilities).	
1970	John Hadl (4–5–3) / Marty Domres (1–1)	Disappointing performances by Hadl led Domres to start in Weeks 5 and 12. Hadl replaced him during both games and resumed the starting role each time.	
1971	John Hadl (6–8)		
1972	John Hadl (4–9–1)		
1973	Johnny Unitas (1–3) / Dan Fouts (0–5–1) / Wayne Clark (1–3)	Hadl was traded to the Los Angeles Rams in favor of free agent Unitas during the offseason, because of the Chargers' switch to a run-oriented offense. Unitas was benched after four games due to a sore shoulder and disappointing play, replaced by Fouts, a rookie. When Charlie Waller replaced Harland Svare as head coach, he installed Clark at quarterback for Weeks 9–12; when Clark struggled, Fouts came back in for the final two games.	
1974	Dan Fouts (3–8) / Jesse Freitas (2–1)	Freitas started the final three games while Fouts was injured (broken thumb).	
1975	Virgil Carter (0–1) / Dan Fouts (2–7) / Jesse Freitas (0–4)	Carter started in Week 1, but was benched after attempting only five passes, and waived without playing again. Freitas started in Weeks 6, 10–11 and 14 due to three separate injuries to Fouts (ankle, shoulder, concussion).	
1976	Dan Fouts (5–8) / Clint Longley (1–0)	Longley was named the starter after replacing Fouts in the Week 12 game and playing well, but was benched in Week 13 for Fouts, who then resumed the starting role.	
1977	James Harris (4–5) / Cliff Olander (1–0) / Dan Fouts (2–2)	Fouts missed the first ten games, as he was holding out to try and force the team to release him. Harris started Weeks 1–9. Olander played Week 10 as Harris was injured (foot).	
1978	Dan Fouts (9–5) / James Harris (0–2)	Harris started in Weeks 4 and 13 due to two separate injuries to Fouts (thumb, ankle).	
1979	Dan Fouts (12–4)		
1980	Dan Fouts (11–5)		
1981	Dan Fouts (10–6)		
1982	Dan Fouts (6–3)		
1983	Dan Fouts (5–5) / Ed Luther (1–5)	Luther started in Weeks 8–12 and 16 due to two separate injuries to Fouts (shoulder, ankle).	
1984	Dan Fouts (6–7) / Ed Luther (1–2)	Luther started in Weeks 14–16 due to a Fouts groin injury.	
1985	Dan Fouts (7–5) / Mark Herrmann (1–3)	Herrmann started in Weeks 5–7 and 16 due to two separate Fouts knee injuries.	
1986	Dan Fouts (3–9) / Tom Flick (1–2) / Mark Herrmann (0–1)	Fouts missed Weeks 8–10 with concussion and Week 12 with a shoulder injury. Herrmann started the first of these, but he also sustained a concussion, and Flick started the remaining three.	
1987	Dan Fouts (5–5) / Rick Neuheisel (2–0) / Mark Herrmann (0–2) / Mike Kelley (1–0)	Neuheisel (Weeks 4 and 6) and Kelley (Week 5) started while the regular NFL players were on strike. Herrmann started in Weeks 11 and 16 due to two separate injuries to Fouts (calf, shoulder).	
1988	Babe Laufenberg (2–4) / Mark Malone (2–6) / Mark Vlasic (2–0)	Fouts retired during the offseason; Laufenberg was named the new starter in preseason. Laufenberg was replaced with Malone after six games due to disappointing play and a rib injury. Malone was replaced with Vlasic after a further four games due to disappointing play and a toe injury. Vlasic started two games before sustaining a knee injury, and Malone returned for the rest of the season.	
1989	Jim McMahon (4–7) / Billy Joe Tolliver (2–3)	McMahon was brought in as a free agent during preseason, and became the starter. He was benched for rookie Tolliver in Week 8 due to bad play and various injuries. Tolliver struggled, and McMahon returned for Weeks 9–12. Tolliver started again in Weeks 13–16 to test his abilities.	
1990	Mark Vlasic (0–1) / Billy Joe Tolliver (6–8) / John Friesz (0–1)	Vlasic was named the starter in preseason. Tolliver replaced Vlasic after he struggled in the opener; Tolliver started the next fourteen games, but he had some weak performances late in the season and rookie Friesz replaced him for the finale.	
1991	John Friesz (4–12)	Friesz won the starting job after outperforming Tolliver in the last preseason game.	
1992	Bob Gagliano (0–1) / Stan Humphries (11–4)	Friesz missed the entire regular season after injuring his knee in a preseason game. Gagliano was named the starter for Week 1, but played poorly and Humphries took over for the rest of the season.	
1993	Stan Humphries (6–4) / John Friesz (2–4)	Humphries was replaced after four games due to bad performances while playing through a shoulder injury. After Friesz was ineffective over the next six games, Humphries was judged by head coach Bobby Ross to have recovered enough to reclaim the starting job.	
1994	Stan Humphries (11–4) / Gale Gilbert (0–1)	Gilbert started in Week 10 due to a Humphries dislocated elbow.	
1995	Stan Humphries (9–6) / Gale Gilbert (0–1)	Gilbert started in Week 7 due to a Humphries shoulder injury.	
1996	Stan Humphries (7–6) / Sean Salisbury (1–2)	Salisbury started in Weeks 9–10 and 15 due to two separate injuries to Humphries (shoulder, concussion).	
1997	Stan Humphries (3–5) / Jim Everett (1–0) / Craig Whelihan (0–7)	Everett started in Week 2 due to a Humphries dislocated shoulder. Whelihan started from Week 11 onwards due to a Humphries concussion and Everett elbow injury.	
1998	Ryan Leaf (3–6) / Craig Whelihan (2–5)	Humphries retired during the offseason. Leaf, the #2 overall pick in the 1998 NFL draft, started the first nine games but was benched for Whelihan after posting a passer rating of 39.9, the worst in the league at that point.	
1999	Jim Harbaugh (6–6) / Erik Kramer (2–2)	Leaf injured his shoulder during the offseason and did not play, while Whelihan was released from the team. Harbaugh opened as the starter, but struggled and was rested after sustaining cracked ribs and a bruised elbow during the Chargers' third game. Kramer was ineffective over the next four games, and Harbaugh returned for the rest of the season.	
2000	Ryan Leaf (1–8) / Moses Moreno (0–2) / Jim Harbaugh (0–5)	Leaf was named the starter after impressing in preseason. Leaf was replaced with Moreno after performing badly in the first two games. Moreno injured his shoulder the following week, and Leaf returned for one more game before picking up a wrist injury. Harbaugh started the next five games before injuring his abdomen. Moreno started the next game and injured his knee. Leaf started the final six.	
2001	Doug Flutie (5–11)	The Chargers either released or did not re-sign each of their three quarterbacks from the previous season. Flutie was a new signing, while Drew Brees was drafted in the 2nd round.	
2002	Drew Brees (8–8)	Brees won the starting job from Flutie in preseason.	
2003	Drew Brees (2–9) / Doug Flutie (2–3)	Brees was benched for poor performance after starting the first eight games. Flutie started the next five, then Brees was reinstalled to test his progress as a quarterback.	
2004	Drew Brees (11–4) / Doug Flutie (1–0)	1st-round draft pick Philip Rivers was brought in to replace Brees, but held out for a month in training camp, and Brees retained the job. He started the first fifteen games, and was replaced by Flutie in the regular season finale only because the Chargers were resting starters for the playoffs.	
2005	Drew Brees (9–7)		
2006	Philip Rivers (14–2)	Brees was allowed to go to the New Orleans Saints in free agency, having dislocated his throwing shoulder in the 2005 season finale.	
2007	Philip Rivers (11–5)		
2008	Philip Rivers (8–8)		
2009	Philip Rivers (13–3)		
2010	Philip Rivers (9–7)		
2011	Philip Rivers (8–8)		
2012	Philip Rivers (7–9)		
2013	Philip Rivers (9–7)		
2014	Philip Rivers (9–7)		
2015	Philip Rivers (4–12)		
2016	Philip Rivers (5–11)		
2017	Philip Rivers (9–7)		
2018	Philip Rivers (12–4)		
2019	Philip Rivers (5–11)		
2020	Tyrod Taylor (1–0) / Justin Herbert (6–9)	Rivers was allowed to join the Indianapolis Colts in free agency, as keeping him would have made it difficult for the Chargers to keep under the salary cap. He had started in 224 consecutive games for the team. Taylor started in Week 1, but a team doctor inadvertently punctured his lung while giving him an injection shortly before the Week 2 game; Herbert, the #6 overall pick in the 2020 NFL draft, took over and kept the role.	
2021	Justin Herbert (9–8)		
2022	Justin Herbert (10–7)		
2023	Justin Herbert (5–8) / Easton Stick (0–4)	Herbert started the first thirteen games before being ruled out for the rest of the season with a fractured finger. Fifth-year backup Easton Stick replaced him for the remainder of the season.	
2024	Justin Herbert (11–6)		
2025	Justin Herbert (11–5) / Trey Lance (0–1)	Lance started in week 18 while Herbert was being rested for the playoffs.	
2026	Justin Herbert (0–2)		

=== Post-season ===
Charger starters by season
Season	Quarterback(s)
1960	Jack Kemp (0–1)
1961	Jack Kemp (0–1)
1963	Tobin Rote (1–0)
1964	Tobin Rote (0–1)
1965	John Hadl (0–1)
1979	Dan Fouts (0–1)
1980	Dan Fouts (1–1)
1981	Dan Fouts (1–1)
1982	Dan Fouts (1–1)
1992	Stan Humphries (1–1)
1994	Stan Humphries (2–1)
1995	Stan Humphries (0–1)
2004	Drew Brees (0–1)
2006	Philip Rivers (0–1)
2007	Philip Rivers (2–1)
2008	Philip Rivers (1–1)
2009	Philip Rivers (0–1)
2013	Philip Rivers (1–1)
2018	Philip Rivers (1–1)
2022	Justin Herbert (0–1)
2024	Justin Herbert (0–1)
2025	Justin Herbert (0–1)

== Summary by quarterback ==
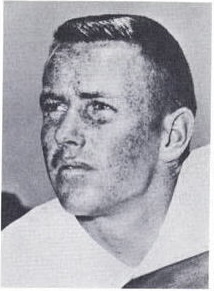
Jack Kemp was the first starter for the Chargers. His regular season winning percentage of 0.786 remains a franchise record (excluding those with only one or two starts).

This is a sortable table. As a default, players are ordered by the date of their first start for the Chargers.

Table key
†	Indicates the player has been inducted into the Pro Football Hall of Fame
Period	Span from first Charger start to last Charger start
GS	Games started for the Chargers
W	Number of wins as starting quarterback
L	Number of losses as starting quarterback
T	Number of ties as starting quarterback
%	Winning percentage as starting quarterback

Los Angeles Chargers starting quarterbacks
Name	Period	Regular season					Postseason				Ref
Name	Period	GS	W	L	T	%	GS	W	L	%	Ref
Jack Kemp	1960–62	28	22	6		.786	2	0	2	.000	
Bob Clatterbuck	1960	2	1	1		.500					
John Hadl	1962–72	123	59	55	9	.516	1	0	1	.000	
Dick Wood	1962	2	2	0		1.000					
Tobin Rote	1963–64	20	13	6	1	.675	2	1	1	.500	
Steve Tensi	1966 (Note: Tensi was also with the Chargers in 1965, but did not start that year.)	2	0	2		.000					
Marty Domres	1969–70 (Note: Domres was also with the Chargers in 1971, but did not start that year.)	6	4	2		.667					
Johnny Unitas †	1973	4	1	3		.250					
Dan Fouts †	1973–87	171	86	84	1	.506	7	3	4	.429	
Wayne Clark	1973 (Note: Clark was with the Chargers from 1970–73, but only started during his final year.)	4	1	3		.250					
Jesse Freitas	1974–75	7	2	5		.286					
Virgil Carter	1975	1	0	1		.000					
Clint Longley	1976	1	1	0		1.000					
James Harris	1977–78 (Note: Harris was with the Chargers from 1977–81, but only started during his first two years.)	11	4	7		.364					
Cliff Olander	1977 (Note: Olander was with the Chargers from 1977–79, but only started during his first year.)	1	1	0		1.000					
Ed Luther	1983–84 (Note: Luther was with the Chargers from 1980–84, but only started during his final two years.)	9	2	7		.222					
Mark Herrmann	1985–87	7	1	6		.143					
Tom Flick	1986	3	1	2		.333					
Rick Neuheisel	1987	2	2	0		1.000					
Mike Kelley	1987	1	1	0		1.000					
Babe Laufenberg	1988 (Note: Laufenberg was also with the Chargers in 1985, but only started during his second stint with the team.)	6	2	4		.333					
Mark Malone	1988	8	2	6		.250					
Mark Vlasic	1988–90 (Note: Vlasic was also with the Chargers in 1987, but didn't start that year.)	3	2	1		.667					
Jim McMahon	1989	11	4	7		.364					
Billy Joe Tolliver	1989–90	19	8	11		.421					
John Friesz	1990–93	23	6	17		.261					
Bob Gagliano	1992 (Note: Gagliano was also with the Chargers in 1991, but did not start that year.)	1	0	1		.000					
Stan Humphries	1992–97	76	47	29		.618	6	3	3	.500	
Gale Gilbert	1994–95	2	0	2		.000					
Sean Salisbury	1996	2	1	2		.333					
Jim Everett	1997	1	1	0		1.000					
Craig Whelihan	1997–98 (Note: Whelihan was with the Chargers from 1995–98, but only started during his final two years.)	14	2	12		.143					
Ryan Leaf	1998–00	18	4	14		.222					
Jim Harbaugh	1999–00	17	6	11		.353					
Erik Kramer	1999	4	2	2		.500					
Moses Moreno	2000 (Note: Moreno was also with the Chargers in 1999, but did not start that year.)	2	0	2		.000					
Doug Flutie	2001–04	22	8	14		.364					
Drew Brees †	2002–05 (Note: Brees was with the Chargers from 2001–05, but did not start during his first year.)	58	30	28		.517	1	0	1	.000	
Philip Rivers	2006–19 (Note: Rivers was with the Chargers from 2004–19, but did not start during his first two years.)	224	123	101		.549	11	5	6	.455	
Tyrod Taylor	2020 (Note: Taylor was also with the Chargers in 2019, but did not start that year.)	1	1	0		1.000					
Justin Herbert	2020–	97	52	45		.536	3	0	3	.000	
Easton Stick	2023 (Note: Stick was with the Chargers from 2019–24, but only started games in 2023.)	4	0	4		.000					
Trey Lance	2025	1	0	1		.000					

== Team career passing records ==
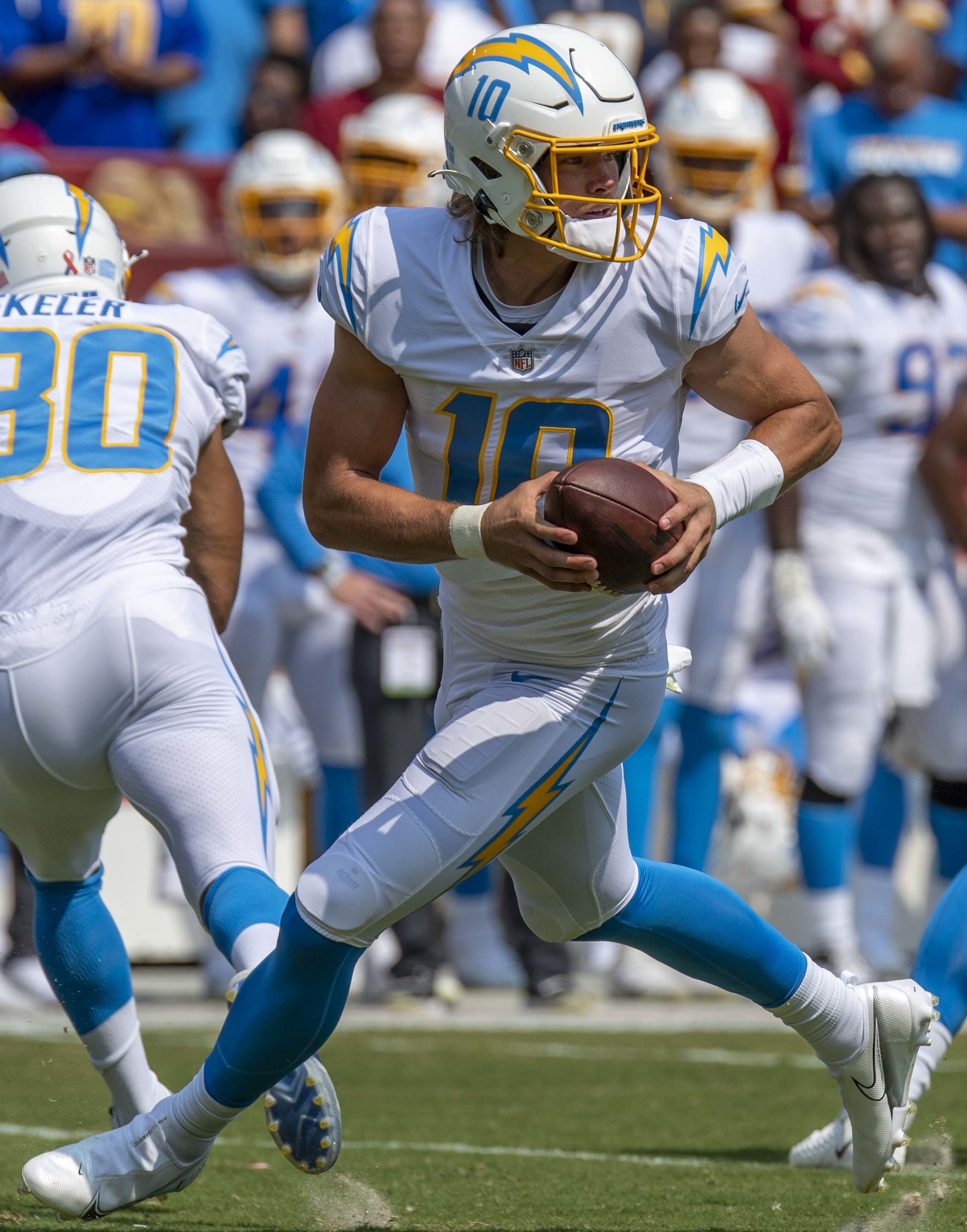
Justin Herbert has started all but five games since week 2, 2020.

Statistics correct through the 2026 NFL season. 1,000 pass attempts minimum. Regular season statistics only.

Table key
Name	Name of player
Comp	Career completions for the Chargers
Att	Career attempts for the Chargers
%	Career completion percentage for the Chargers
Yds	Career passing yards for the Chargers
TD	Career passing touchdowns for the Chargers
Int	Career passing interceptions for the Chargers

Los Angeles Chargers statistical passing leaders
Name	Comp	Att	%	Yds	TD	Int
Philip Rivers	4,908	7,591	64.7	59,271	397	198
Dan Fouts	3,297	5,604	58.8	43,040	254	242
John Hadl	1,824	3,640	50.1	26,938	201	211
Justin Herbert	2,317	3,492	66.4	25,221	165	61
Stan Humphries	1,335	2,350	56.8	16,085	85	73
Drew Brees	1,125	1,809	62.2	12,348	80	53

== See also ==
- List of American Football League players
- List of NFL starting quarterbacks
