= Rod Bernstine =

American football player (born 1965)

No. 82, 33
- Positions: Running back, tight end

Personal information
- Born: February 8, 1965 (age 61); Fairfield, California, U.S.
- Listed height: 6 ft 3 in (1.91 m)
- Listed weight: 238 lb (108 kg)

Career information
- High school: Bryan (Bryan, Texas)
- College: Texas A&M
- NFL draft: 1987: 1st round, 24th overall pick

Career history
- San Diego Chargers (1987–1992); Denver Broncos (1993–1995)

Awards and highlights
- Second-team All-American (1986); First-team All-SWC (1986)

Career NFL statistics
- Rushing yards: 2,990
- Rushing average: 4.5
- Receptions: 149
- Receiving yards: 1,384
- Total touchdowns: 24
- Stats at Pro Football Reference

Roderick Earl Bernstine (born February 8, 1965) is an American former professional football player who was a running back and tight end in the National Football League (NFL). He played college football for the Texas A&M Aggies and was selected by the San Diego Chargers in the first round of the 1987 NFL draft with the 24th overall pick. Bernstine played in nine NFL seasons from 1987 to 1995. His best season as a pro came during the 1993 season as a member of the Denver Broncos, when he rushed for 816 yards and caught 44 receptions. Due to a loophole in official NFL rules he was the only active running back allowed to wear the number 82 while playing for the San Diego Chargers, a number reserved for wide receivers and tight ends. Upon being traded to the Denver Broncos in 1993 he changed his number to 33, an official running back number.

== College career ==
Bernstine lettered at Texas A&M from 1983 to 1986. Before his sophomore season at Texas A&M, Bernstine reacted negatively after then-A&M coach Jackie Sherrill told him that he was being moved to tight end, after playing a year at running back. As a senior in 1986, he was named first team All-SWC at tight end. That same year, he set the school record for the most receptions in a single season with 65, a record that stood until 2010. Bernstine's 65 catches is still the school single-season record for most ever by a tight end.

== NFL career statistics ==
Pre-draft measurables
Height	Weight	Arm length	Hand span	40-yard dash	10-yard split	20-yard split	20-yard shuttle	Vertical jump	Broad jump	Bench press
6 ft 3 in (1.91 m)	238 lb (108 kg)	32 1/4 in (0.82 m)	10 in (0.25 m)	4.68 s	1.67 s	2.68 s	4.39 s	29.5 in (0.75 m)	9 ft 4 in (2.84 m)	18 reps
All values from NFL Combine

Legend
**Bold**	Career high

=== Regular season ===
Year	Team	Games		Rushing					Receiving				
Year	Team	GP	GS	Att	Yds	Avg	Lng	TD	Rec	Yds	Avg	Lng	TD
1987	SDG	10	2	1	9	9.0	9	0	10	76	7.6	15	**1**
1988	SDG	14	13	2	7	3.5	5	0	29	340	**11.7**	**59**	0
1989	SDG	5	0	15	137	**9.1**	32	1	21	222	10.6	36	**1**
1990	SDG	12	1	124	589	4.8	40	4	8	40	5.0	11	0
1991	SDG	13	8	159	766	4.8	**63**	**8**	11	124	11.3	25	0
1992	SDG	9	1	106	499	4.7	25	4	12	86	7.2	16	0
1993	DEN	**15**	**14**	**223**	**816**	3.7	24	4	**44**	**372**	8.5	41	0
1994	DEN	3	3	17	91	5.4	24	0	9	70	7.8	16	0
1995	DEN	3	3	23	76	3.3	18	1	5	54	10.8	38	0
		84	45	670	2,990	4.5	63	22	149	1,384	9.3	59	2

=== Playoffs ===
Year	Team	Games		Rushing					Receiving				
Year	Team	GP	GS	Att	Yds	Avg	Lng	TD	Rec	Yds	Avg	Lng	TD
1992	SDG	1	0	1	3	3.0	3	0	0	0	0.0	0	0
		1	0	1	3	3.0	3	0	0	0	0.0	0	0

== Personal life ==
Bernstine and his ex-wife Stephanie met at Bryan High School in Bryan, Texas. They began dating while both were students and at Texas A&M University. They have two children. They all reside in the Denver, Colorado area.

Bernstine's older brother Nehames "Pookie" Bernstine played baseball for Lewis-Clark College in Lewiston, Idaho. Pookie Bernstine was selected by the Cleveland Indians in the 5th Round (118th overall) of the 1982 amateur entry draft (June-Reg).

Bernstine's son, Roderick E. Bernstine Jr., signed a letter of intent to play basketball for the University of Denver in November 2012, but transferred to the University of North Dakota after only one season. His nephew, Jordan, was a safety who formerly played for the Washington Redskins.
