= Terry Beauford =

American football player and coach (born 1968)

Biographical details
- Born: March 27, 1968 (age 58); Fort Pierce, Florida, U.S.
- Died: January 4, 2026; Fort Pierce, Florida, U.S.

Playing career
- 1987–1990: Florida A&M
- 1991: San Diego Chargers
- 1992-1994*: Green Bay Packers
- 1994–1995: Shreveport Pirates
- 1996–2000: Tampa Bay Storm
- Position: Offensive guard

Coaching career (HC unless noted)
- 1997: Hampton (DT)
- 1998–1999: Lane (AHC/OC)
- 2000–2004: Hampton (OL)
- 2005–2006: Morehouse
- 2007–2011: Hampton (OC/OL)

Head coaching record
- Overall: 5–16

Accomplishments and honors

Championships
- ArenaBowl (1996)

Terry Beauford (born March 27, 1968) is an American former football player and coach. He served as the head football coach at Morehouse College in Atlanta, Georgia from 2005 to 2006, compiling a record of 5–16. After this continued to couch Fort Valley State and then to couch the Pirates at Hampton University.

Beauford played college football for the Florida A&M Rattlers and was selected by the San Diego Chargers of the National Football League (NFL) in the seventh round of the 1991 NFL draft.

He is married to Yulonda Daren-Beauford and has one daughter Tierra Brianna Beauford.

== Head coaching record ==
Year	Team	Overall	Conference	Standing	Bowl/playoffs
Morehouse Maroon Tigers (Southern Intercollegiate Athletic Conference) (2005–2006)
2005	Morehouse	3–7	2–7	9th	
2006	Morehouse	2–9	1–6	9th	
Morehouse:		5–16	3–13		
Total:		5–16			
