= Nate Lewis =

American football player (born 1966)

No. 81, 82, 13
- Position: Wide receiver

Personal information
- Born: October 19, 1966 (age 60); Moultrie, Georgia, U.S.
- Listed height: 5 ft 11 in (1.80 m)
- Listed weight: 198 lb (90 kg)

Career information
- High school: Colquitt County (Norman Park, Georgia)
- College: Georgia; Oregon Tech
- NFL draft: 1990: 7th round, 187th overall pick

Career history
- San Diego Chargers (1990–1993); Los Angeles Rams (1994)*; Chicago Bears (1994); Atlanta Falcons (1995)*; Chicago Bears (1995)
- * Offseason or practice squad member only

Career NFL statistics
- Receptions: 130
- Receiving yards: 1,802
- Rushing yards: 44
- Rushing average: 3.7
- Touchdowns: 16
- Stats at Pro Football Reference

Nathaniel Lewis (born October 19, 1966) is an American former professional football player who was a wide receiver in the National Football League (NFL). He played college football for the Georgia Bulldogs and Oregon Tech Owls before being selected by the San Diego Chargers in the seventh round of the 1990 NFL draft. He played six seasons for the Chargers from 1990 to 1993 and Chicago Bears from 1994 to 1995.

== Early life and education ==
Born and raised in Moultrie, Georgia, Lewis attended Oregon Tech where he played one season his senior year. Following his freshman year at a junior college: Oklahoma A&M, Lewis played at Georgia his sophomore and junior years, however he was dismissed due to academic reasons following his junior year.

== Football career ==
His senior year at Oregon Tech was ended short due to a leg injury, but included 27 caught passes for 434 yards and two touchdowns.
