= Mark Vlasic =

American football player (born 1963)

No. 13
- Position: Quarterback

Personal information
- Born: October 25, 1963 (age 63); Rochester, Pennsylvania, U.S.
- Listed height: 6 ft 3 in (1.91 m)
- Listed weight: 205 lb (93 kg)

Career information
- High school: Center (Center Township, Pennsylvania)
- College: Iowa (1982-1986)
- NFL draft: 1987: 4th round, 88th overall pick

Career history
- San Diego Chargers (1987–1990); Kansas City Chiefs (1991–1992); Tampa Bay Buccaneers (1993)

Career NFL statistics
- Passing attempts: 142
- Passing completions: 75
- Completion percentage: 52.8%
- TD–INT: 4–5
- Passing yards: 762
- Passer rating: 63.2
- Stats at Pro Football Reference

Mark Richard Vlasic (born October 25, 1963) is an American former professional football player who was a quarterback for six seasons in the National Football League (NFL). During this time, he played for the San Diego Chargers, Kansas City Chiefs and Tampa Bay Buccaneers. Over the course of his career, he played in 15 games, completed 75 of 142 passes for 762 yards, threw four touchdowns and five interceptions, and finished his career with a passer rating of 63.2.

Vlasic played college football for the Iowa Hawkeyes and was selected in the fourth round of the 1987 NFL draft by the San Diego Chargers. He was a backup for Dan Fouts during his first season, then started two games the following year. After not seeing playing time in 1989, Vlasic started the season opener in 1990, his last year with San Diego. He played for two seasons with Kansas City and one with Tampa Bay, but was released in 1994, having not had actual playing time since 1991.

== Early life and college ==
Vlasic was born in Rochester, Pennsylvania. He attended Center High School and was a standout in football and basketball there. He was the starting quarterback for Center in his junior year, throwing for 777 yards in the first eight games of the season. In his junior year of basketball, Vlasic was a starter, in one game scoring 23 points and 11 rebounds with a bad back. He continued to play football and basketball during his senior year, with performances that included a 36-point effort against Las Vegas Western High School, making 18 of 20 shots. As a result of his high school career, Vlasic was inducted into the Beaver County Sports Hall of Fame in 1999.

After graduating from high school, Vlasic played college football at the University of Iowa. For four years, he served as a backup to Chuck Long, now a member of the College Football Hall of Fame. During his junior year, as the backup quarterback, he also served as the holder for field goal kicks. After placekicker Rob Houghtlin won a 12–10 game against the University of Michigan thanks to a last second field goal, a mob tore down the goalpost, which injured four fans including Vlasic, who was at the bottom of a pile of fans.

The following season Vlasic, now a fifth-year senior, became the starter, as Long graduated. Although he was taking over for the Heisman Trophy runner-up, his strong arm was complimented, albeit backhandedly, by coach Hayden Fry, who said, "He's got a stronger arm than Long, and he proves it every day by overthrowing his receivers." In Vlasic's first game as starter, he threw for 288 yards in a 43–7 win against Iowa State University, a game that made Hayden Fry the most victorious coach in Iowa football history. After two more victories, Vlasic went down with a separated shoulder, returning to the lineup after freshmen Dan McGwire and Tom Poholsky took over the starting role.

In a late October game against Northwestern, Vlasic threw a 93-yard touchdown pass to Quinn Early, the longest in Iowa history, in a 27–20 victory against Northwestern University. Despite his injury causing him to serve as a backup most of the season, he was given the start for the 1986 Holiday Bowl against San Diego State University. In the Holiday Bowl, Vlasic completed 15 of 28 passes 222 yards and ran for a touchdown as Iowa won, 39–38.

== Professional career ==
=== San Diego Chargers ===
Vlasic was selected by the San Diego Chargers in the fourth round of the 1987 NFL draft with the 88th overall pick. Chargers coach Al Saunders chose Vlasic because he wanted to find a young quarterback to observe and succeed Dan Fouts. He signed with the team in late July, and spent the preseason competing with Rick Neuheisel, Tom Flick, and others for the backup quarterback job. While he performed well in the preseason, the Chargers were looking to have him sit out a year so he could learn the ins-and-outs or pro football. After Flick was cut and Mark Herrmann named the primary backup, Vlasic beat out Neuheisel for the final quarterback spot on the Chargers' roster, though Neuheisel would rejoin the team later that season due to the strike. Despite making the roster, Vlasic spent most of the season after the players' strike on the team's inactive list. However, when Fouts was scratched from a December game against the Denver Broncos due to a shoulder injury, Vlasic was called up to be Herrman's backup. He made his professional debut on December 27, 1987, playing the final 5:29 of the game. He completed three of six passes for eight yards, was sacked, and threw an interception in the Chargers' 24–0 loss against Denver.

Before the 1988 San Diego Chargers season began, Dan Fouts chose to retire from the game after 15 seasons, leaving Vlasic as the main backup to starter Mark Herrmann, and as a result the Chargers began trying to trade for an experienced quarterback. The Chargers also signed Mark Malone and Babe Laufenberg to compete for the starting job, and traded Herrmann to the Indianapolis Colts. After months of training and the 1988 preseason, Vlasic began the season as the third-string quarterback behind Malone and Laufenberg, who won the starting job. In November, after Laufenberg was injured, the Chargers decided to make Vlasic the starter instead of Malone due to the latter's ineffectiveness, as well as a six-game losing streak. He made his season debut against the Atlanta Falcons on November 13, and threw for 190 yards in a 10–7 victory. As a result of his performance, coach Al Saunders said that Vlasic would have the starting job for the rest of the season. Vlasic's second start came against the Los Angeles Rams where he threw for 80 yards and a touchdown. However, he suffered torn ligaments in his left knee late in the third quarter, and was lost for the season. He finished the season with 25 of 52 passes completed and a passer rating of 54.2.

Vlasic spent the 1989 off-season recovering form his injury, while the Chargers added another quarterback to the roster upon drafting Billy Joe Tolliver. After working out with the team during the preseason, he started the season on the Physically Unable to Perform list. With the Chargers having a reliable starter in Jim McMahon, who had been signed to the team, Vlasic was kept on the list for the season. In 1990, McMahon was released and John Friesz was drafted out of the University of Idaho, leaving Vlasic to compete with Friesz and David Archer for the backup quarterback job. As the preseason began for the 1990 San Diego Chargers season, the team released Archer, and the plan was for Friesz to split backup quarterback duties during the preseason. After an impressive preseason by Vlasic and only a pedestrian one by Tolliver, Chargers coach Dan Henning named Vlasic as the starting quarterback against the Dallas Cowboys in the season opener, citing that he was "steadier" than Tolliver. After losing the game 17–14, the switch was made back to Tolliver as the starting quarterback, and was eventually named starter for the rest of the season. Despite this, Vlasic remained optimistic, saying, "I feel confident in my ability, and I always have. I know I can get the job done whatever the situation. I have to believe that." Over the course of the 1990 season, Vlasic played in six games, completing 19 of 40 passes for 168 yards, one touchdown, two interceptions, and a passer rating of 46.7.

At the end of the season, coach Henning said that Tolliver was to be the starter heading into next season, and that the team would not protect Vlasic under Plan B free agency, meaning he could sign with any interested team. As a result, he began to meet with other teams that were looking for a quarterback, including the Cowboys and Green Bay Packers.

=== Kansas City Chiefs ===
After meeting with the Cowboys and Kansas City Chiefs, it was reported that Vlasic signed a two-year deal with the Chiefs in March, with Vlasic's agent confirming but Chiefs general manager Carl Peterson denying it. The Cowboys stated that they would not enter a bidding war, and the signing was confirmed shortly afterward. Vlasic spent the 1991 preseason competing with Steve Pelluer and Mike Elkins for the backup quarterback job. By the end of the preseason, both Pelluer and Elkins were cut, leaving Vlasic as the backup behind Steve DeBerg. He spent most of the season backing up DeBerg and getting occasional action. His most significant day as a backup came on November 17 against the Denver Broncos. Vlasic relieved DeBerg, who had thrown four interceptions, and completed nine of 14 passes for 91 yards and a touchdown in a 24–20 loss. The highlight of Vlasic's season was a matchup on December 8 against his old team, the Chargers. After replacing DeBerg in the second half with the Chiefs down by 14 points, Vlasic completed 12 of 18 passes for 150 yards and a touchdown as the Chiefs beat the Chargers in overtime, 20–17, and giving the Chiefs a playoff berth in the process. As a result of this performance, Vlasic was given the start for next week's game against the San Francisco 49ers. However, he sprained his knee in the second quarter, and did not play the final regular season game. Vlasic missed the wild card playoff game against the Oakland Raiders, but was available for the divisional playoff series against the Buffalo Bills. After DeBerg left in the second quarter due to injury, Vlasic entered the game in what was his only playoff appearance. He completed nine of 20 passes for 124 yards and threw four interceptions in a 37–14 blowout that marked the end of the Chiefs' playoff run. Vlasic's stats for 1991 were 28 completions in 44 attempts, 316 yards, two touchdowns, and a passer rating of 100.2.

As the 1992 Kansas City Chiefs season began, the team's first big move was the signing of quarterback Dave Krieg to compete with DeBerg and Vlasic. A couple weeks after Krieg's signing, DeBerg signed with the Tampa Bay Buccaneers, leaving Vlasic as the primary backup to Krieg. The Chiefs went into training camp and went through the preseason with Krieg, Vlasic, and rookie draft pick Matt Blundin. Krieg ended up playing every snap of the season, leaving Vlasic without a year's worth of playing time as his contract expired. The trading of Joe Montana to the Chiefs put a definitive end to Vlasic's time in Kansas City.

=== Tampa Bay Buccaneers ===
On April 30, 1993, Vlasic signed a two-year contract with the Tampa Bay Buccaneers, reuniting himself with former teammate Steve DeBerg. Vlasic began the preseason competing the third-string quarterback job behind Mike Pawlawski while DeBerg and Craig Erickson competed for the starting job. At the end of preseason, however, Vlasic was among the final group cut by the Buccaneers. When DeBerg was cut from the team in early November, Vlasic was re-signed to the team in his place. He remained on the roster for the 1994 preseason, but his only preseason pass was intercepted and returned for a touchdown, and he was waived shortly afterward. This marked the end of Vlasic's professional football career.

== Personal life ==
Before his inaugural season of pro football, Vlasic, a finance major at Iowa, got a real estate license in case pro football did not work out. Vlasic is currently a Senior Wealth Advisor with Mariner Wealth Advisors in Overland Park KS. He has a wife and three children.
