= Floyd Fields =

American football player (born 1969)

No. 26
- Position: Safety

Personal information
- Born: January 7, 1969 (age 57); Markham, Illinois, U.S.
- Listed height: 6 ft 0 in (1.83 m)
- Listed weight: 208 lb (94 kg)

Career information
- High school: Thornwood (South Holland, Illinois)
- College: Arizona State
- NFL draft: 1991: 5th round, 127th overall pick

Career history
- San Diego Chargers (1991–1993); Cleveland Browns (1994)*; Dallas Cowboys (1995)*
- * Offseason or practice squad member only

Career NFL statistics
- Interceptions: 1
- Stats at Pro Football Reference

Floyd Cornelius Fields (born January 7, 1969) is an American former professional football player who was a safety for three seasons with the San Diego Chargers in the National Football League (NFL). He played college football for the Arizona State Sun Devils and was selected by the Chargers in the fifth round of the 1991 NFL draft with the 127th overall pick.
