= George Thornton (American football) =

American football player (born 1968)

No. 93, 79
- Position: Defensive tackle

Personal information
- Born: April 27, 1968 (age 58); Montgomery, Alabama, U.S.
- Listed height: 6 ft 3 in (1.91 m)
- Listed weight: 300 lb (136 kg)

Career information
- High school: Jefferson Davis (Montgomery)
- College: Alabama
- NFL draft: 1991: 2nd round, 36th overall pick

Career history
- San Diego Chargers (1991–1992); New York Giants (1993)

Awards and highlights
- First-team All-SEC (1990)

Career NFL statistics
- Games: 37
- Sacks: 2
- Stats at Pro Football Reference

George Renardo Thornton (born April 27, 1968) is an American former professional football player who was a defensive tackle in the National Football League (NFL). He played college football for the Alabama Crimson Tide and was selected by the San Diego Chargers in the second round of the 1991 NFL draft with the 36th overall pick. He played three years for the Chargers and New York Giants. On October 14, 1993, he suffered a minor stroke which ended his career.

Thornton attended Jeff Davis High School in Montgomery, Alabama. At the University of Alabama, he was an All-SEC defensive end in 1990. He is married to Tawanna and they have a son, George Jr. and a daughter, Georvauna Tene' (deceased).
