= Chris Samuels (running back) =

Jamaican-born American football player

No. 20
- Position: Running back

Personal information
- Born: May 16, 1969; Montego Bay, Jamaica
- Died: November 26, 2021 (aged 52); San Antonio, Texas, U.S.
- Listed height: 5 ft 10 in (1.78 m)
- Listed weight: 202 lb (92 kg)

Career information
- High school: Cole (San Antonio, Texas); Judson (Converse, Texas)
- College: Texas (1987–1990)
- NFL draft: 1991: 12th round, 317th overall pick

Career history
- San Diego Chargers (1991)

Career NFL statistics
- Rushing yards: 10
- Receptions: 2
- Receiving yards: 33
- Stats at Pro Football Reference

Christopher Auburn Samuels (May 16, 1969 – November 26, 2021) was a Jamaican-born American professional football player who was a running back in the National Football League (NFL). He moved to the U.S. at age five and attended high school in Texas, where he was a standout running back at Judson High School. After high school, he played four years of college football for the Texas Longhorns, running for over 1,000 yards in his career and helping them win the Southwestern Conference title in 1990. He was selected by the San Diego Chargers in the 12th round of the 1991 NFL draft and played one season for them. After his football career, he worked as a physician assistant until his death in 2021.

== Early life ==
Christopher Auburn Samuels was born on May 16, 1969, in Montego Bay, Jamaica. He lived in the village of St. James until his family moved to Harlem, New York City, when he was five. He started playing football in a local youth league while in New York. His mother later joined the United States Army when Samuels was 13 and was assigned to Fort Sam Houston, resulting in the family moving to San Antonio, Texas. He attended Robert G. Cole Junior-Senior High School in San Antonio before transferring to Judson High School in Converse for his last two years.

At Judson, Samuels competed in both football as a running back and track and field as a sprinter. He was a standout in football in high school and was nicknamed the "Judson Rocket". As a senior, he helped Judson to the Class 5A semifinals and was named all-state after running for 1,663 yards and 21 touchdowns. Samuels was ranked the 44th-best recruit in Texas and signed to play college football for the Texas Longhorns.

== College career ==
Samuels was used mostly as a backup running back and on special teams at Texas. As a freshman in 1987, he ran 16 times for 107 yards and a touchdown. Initially a fullback, he was moved to tailback early in his sophomore year. That year, he ran 45 times for 202 yards and four touchdowns. He saw more playing time in 1989 after the graduation of Eric Metcalf and also served as the team's primary return specialist. He ran for 410 yards and three touchdowns, caught 16 passes for 149 yards and had 336 return yards.

Samuels was starting slotback from the middle of the 1989 season to 1990, although he initially lost a starting role due to injury at the start of the 1990 season. Samuels was used sparingly as a runner for the first few games of the 1990 season before seeing more carries starting with the fifth game of the season. During the 1990 season, he was their third-leading receiver, fourth-leading rusher and a top punt returner. Samuels helped Texas to a 10–2 record, the Southwest Conference (SWC) title and a 1991 Cotton Bowl Classic berth. He finished the season with 372 rushing yards and four touchdowns, 26 receptions for 253 receiving yards, and averaged 8.0 yards per punt return. He concluded his collegiate career with 1,086 rushing yards, 448 receiving yards and 822 return yards for a total of over 2,000 all-purpose yards. He also scored 12 touchdowns with the Longhorns while appearing in 43 career games. While at Texas, Samuels majored in economics and also spent a summer working for a brokerage firm in New York.

== Professional career ==
Samuels was selected by the San Diego Chargers in the 12th round (317th overall) of the 1991 NFL draft, being the team's last pick. He was a standout in training camp and was used by the team at several different positions on offense and special teams. He was released on August 26, 1991, then re-signed to the practice squad two days later. He was signed to the active roster on October 26. Samuels made his NFL debut the following day, running once for six yards in a Week 9 loss to the Seattle Seahawks. He had one run and one catch, each for four yards, in his next game, a Week 11 win against the Seahawks. The following week, he caught one pass for 29 yards near the end of the fourth quarter, setting up a game-winning field goal in an upset over the New Orleans Saints. However, he broke his leg while making the catch and missed the rest of the season. He was released by the Chargers on July 24, 1992, prior to the 1992 season, which ended his NFL career. In three games played, he ran twice for 10 yards and caught two passes for 33 yards.

== Later life and death ==
Samuels entered medicine after his brief NFL career, attending the Texas Tech University Health Sciences Center where he graduated in 2009 with a physician assistant license. He served 12 years as a physician assistant and worked at a hospital in the area. Samuels had two daughters. He was found dead at his home on November 26, 2021, of a gunshot wound, aged 52. His death was ruled a suicide. His daughters donated his brain to Boston University, where it was discovered he had advanced chronic traumatic encephalopathy (CTE), linked to repeated head trauma. In 2023, they filed a wrongful death and negligence lawsuit against the NFL, stating in the lawsuit that the league "actively concealed the risks to players of repetitive sub-concussive and concussive head impacts".
