= John Friesz =

American football player (born 1967)

No. 17
- Position: Quarterback

Personal information
- Born: May 19, 1967 (age 59); Missoula, Montana, U.S.
- Listed height: 6 ft 4 in (1.93 m)
- Listed weight: 220 lb (100 kg)

Career information
- High school: Coeur d'Alene (Coeur d'Alene, Idaho)
- College: Idaho (1986–1989)
- NFL draft: 1990: 6th round, 138th overall pick

Career history
- San Diego Chargers (1990–1993); Washington Redskins (1994); Seattle Seahawks (1995–1998); New England Patriots (1999–2000)

Awards and highlights
- Walter Payton Award (1989); Consensus I-AA All-American (1989); Second-team I-AA All-American (1988); 3× Big Sky Most Valuable Player (1987–1989); 3× First-team All-Big Sky (1987–1989); Idaho Vandals No. 17 retired

Career NFL statistics
- Passing attempts: 1,364
- Passing completions: 745
- Completion percentage: 54.6%
- TD–INT: 45–42
- Passing yards: 8,699
- Passer rating: 72.3
- Stats at Pro Football Reference
- College Football Hall of Fame

John Melvin "Deep" Friesz (FREEZE; born May 19, 1967) is an American former professional football player who was a quarterback in the National Football League (NFL) for four teams. He played college football for the Idaho Vandals and was selected in the 1990 NFL draft by the San Diego Chargers. He later played for the Washington Redskins, the Seattle Seahawks, and the New England Patriots.

== Early life ==
Born in Missoula, Montana, Friesz moved with his family in 1975 to Coeur d'Alene, Idaho; he attended Coeur d'Alene High School and graduated in 1985. Friesz spent two seasons as a back-up; as a sophomore, he was third-string behind senior Steve Halliday and junior Scott Wellman as the Vikings won their first state title in 1982. The next year, CDA was state runner-up behind Wellman; Friesz became the starter in his senior season in 1984.

His first game was against perennial state power Borah in Boise, who had beaten the Vikings 27–23 at Coeur d'Alene in 1983. The #2-ranked CDA Vikings returned the favor and beat the Lions 19–14 on the then-green AstroTurf of Bronco Stadium. Friesz completed 21 of 40 passes for 260 yards and two touchdowns in his starting debut. The Vikings took over the top spot in the state poll and beat Rogers of Spokane 46–0 the following week. They won their first ten games, but lost in the state semifinals 25–20 to Capital, who also had handed them their last loss, at the finals in 1983. The game was played at a neutral site, the Kibbie Dome in Moscow, Friesz's future home field. He finished the season with over 1,900 yards passing and 19 touchdowns in eleven games, and was second-team all-state. (CDA won the state title the following year with Duane Halliday at quarterback.)

Friesz enrolled at the University of Idaho, recruited by head coach Dennis Erickson, after attending the coach's Vandal football camp in the summer of 1984. Lightly recruited, his only other offer was from New Mexico, at the time a struggling program in the Western Athletic Conference. Friesz had been turned down by Big Sky member Weber State, then coached by Mike Price.

== College career ==
Friesz redshirted in 1985 as the Vandals won their first outright Big Sky Conference title since 1971. In 1986, under new head coach Keith Gilbertson, he served as the backup to Scott Linehan, who would go on to become head coach of the St. Louis Rams.

Friesz was the Vandals starting quarterback for three years, beginning in 1987, when he threw 28 touchdown passes as a sophomore and was named player of the year in the Big Sky and second-team All-American (Division I-AA). In his junior season of 1988, he guided the Vandals to a 9–1 regular season and two playoff wins, ending the season with a road loss in the Division I-AA semi-finals to the eventual National Champion Furman University. He was a consensus All-American selection at quarterback.

In his senior season in 1989, Friesz threw 31 touchdowns and for over 4,000 yards in guiding the Vandals to their third consecutive conference championship. Idaho went undefeated in conference play (8–0), the only time in school history. Friesz averaged over 360 yards per game and passed for over 300 yards in ten consecutive games. He received the Walter Payton Award as the outstanding player in the nation in Division I-AA.

In his college career, #17 passed for over 10,000 yards and was the conference player-of-the-year for three consecutive years. The Vandals' annual MVP award has been renamed the John Friesz Award in his honor.

In August 2006, Friesz was inducted into the College Football Hall of Fame in South Bend, Indiana. His #17 was officially retired by the University of Idaho in October 2006. The same number was retired by his high school in 1991.

== Professional career ==
Pre-draft measurables
Height	Weight	Arm length	Hand span	40-yard dash	10-yard split	20-yard split	20-yard shuttle	Vertical jump
6 ft 4 1/4 in (1.94 m)	209 lb (95 kg)	31 5/8 in (0.80 m)	8 3/4 in (0.22 m)	5.29 s	1.82 s	3.11 s	4.57 s	22.0 in (0.56 m)
All values from NFL Combine

In the 1990 NFL draft, Friesz was the tenth quarterback selected, taken in the sixth round (138th overall) by the San Diego Chargers. Other quarterbacks in this draft were Jeff George (#1 overall pick), Heisman Trophy winner Andre Ware, future Super Bowl starter Neil O'Donnell, and Scott Mitchell.

Friesz became the starting quarterback for the Chargers in 1991, his second season. He suffered a season-ending knee injury in a pre-season game in 1992. The Chargers then acquired quarterback Stan Humphries from the Washington Redskins, who was drafted by then Redskins general manager Bobby Beathard, who was the Chargers general manager at that time. Humphries became the starting quarterback and led the Chargers, who were winless in their first four games, to an 11–5 record, ending a ten-year playoff drought and winning their first AFC West Division title since 1981 under rookie coach Bobby Ross. Friesz returned to the Chargers the next season as the backup quarterback and left the Chargers as a free agent prior to the 1994 season.

Friesz passed for over 8,600 yards and 45 touchdowns in his professional career.

== NFL career statistics ==
Year	Team	GP	GS	Cmp	Att	Pct	Yds	TD	Int	Rtg
1990	SD	1	1	11	22	50.0	98	1	1	58.5
1991	SD	16	16	262	487	53.8	2,896	12	15	67.1
1992	SD	0	0	DNP						
1993	SD	12	6	128	238	53.8	1,402	6	4	72.8
1994	WAS	16	4	105	180	58.3	1,266	10	9	77.7
1995	SEA	6	3	64	120	53.3	795	6	3	80.4
1996	SEA	8	6	120	211	56.9	1,629	8	4	86.4
1997	SEA	2	1	15	36	41.7	138	0	3	18.1
1998	SEA	6	1	29	49	59.2	409	2	2	82.8
1999	NE	1	0	0	0	0.0	0	0	0	0.0
2000	NE	1	0	11	21	52.4	66	0	1	39.0
Career		69	38	745	1,364	54.6	8,699	45	42	72.3
