= 1992 Kansas City Chiefs season =

NFL team season

- Owner: Lamar Hunt
- General manager: Carl Peterson
- Head coach: Marty Schottenheimer
- Offensive coordinator: Joe Pendry
- Defensive coordinator: Dave Adolph
- Home stadium: Arrowhead Stadium

Results
- Record: 10–6
- Division place: 2nd AFC West
- Playoffs: Lost Wild Card Playoffs (at Chargers) 0–17
- All-Pros: None
- Pro Bowlers: 4: T John Alt; DE Neil Smith; LB Derrick Thomas; K Nick Lowery

The 1992 Kansas City Chiefs season was the franchise's 23rd season in the National Football League and the 33rd overall. The Chiefs matched their 10–6 record from 1991, but were shut out by the San Diego Chargers 17–0 in the wild-card round.

Former Seattle Seahawks quarterback Dave Krieg played well for the Chiefs passing for 3,115 yards. Defense would be the key for the Chiefs third straight playoff berth as Derrick Thomas and Neil Smith recorded 14.5 sacks each.

During the season; the Chiefs wore a "WWD" patch on their jerseys in tribute to vice president of player personnel Whitey Dovell, who died in May 1992.

== Offseason ==
Additions	Subtractions
C Mike Baab (Browns)	QB Steve DeBerg (Buccaneers)
QB Dave Krieg (Seahawks)	TE Pete Holohan (Browns)
TE Mike Dyal (Raiders)	S Lloyd Burruss
S Bennie Thompson (Saints)	WR Robb Thomas (Seahawks)
DT Tim Newton (Buccaneers)	
DT Joe Phillips (Chargers)	
S Martin Bayless (Chargers)	

=== Draft ===
1992 Kansas City Chiefs draft
Round	Pick	Player	Position	College	Notes
1	20	Dale Carter *	Cornerback	Tennessee	
2	40	Matt Blundin	Quarterback	Virginia	
4	101	Mike Evans	Defensive tackle	Michigan	
6	159	Tony Smith	Wide receiver	Notre Dame	
7	186	Erick Anderson	Linebacker	Michigan	
8	213	Jim Jennings	Guard	San Diego State	
9	244	Jay Leeuwenburg	Center	Colorado	
10	271	Jerry Ostroski	Guard	Tulsa	
11	298	Doug Rigby	Defensive end	Wyoming	
12	325	Corey Williams	Defensive back	Oklahoma State	
Made roster * Made at least one Pro Bowl during career

=== Undrafted free agents ===
1992 undrafted free agents of note
Player	Position	College
Eddie Brown	Wide receiver	Iowa State
Phil Bryant	Running back	Virginia Tech
Dan DeArmus	Punter	Maryland
Santo Stephens	Linebacker	Temple
Doug Terry	Safety	Kansas

== Personnel ==
=== Staff ===
1992 Kansas City Chiefs staff
Front office: Founder – Lamar Hunt; Chairman of the board – Jack Steadman; President/general manager/Chief Executive Officer – Carl Peterson; Assistant general manager – Dennis Thum; Vice-president of player personnel – Lynn Stiles; Director of pro personnel – Mark Hatley; Head coaches: Head coach – Marty Schottenheimer; Assistant head coach/wide receivers – Al Saunders; Offensive coaches: Offensive coordinator – Joe Pendry; Running backs – Bruce Arians; Offensive line – Howard Mudd; Offense/tight ends – Jimmy Raye	Defensive coaches: Defensive coordinator/linebackers – Dave Adolph; Defensive line – Tom Pratt; Defensive backs – Herman Edwards; Defensive assistant/quality control – Darvin Wallis; Special teams coaches: Special teams – Kurt Schottenheimer; Strength and conditioning: Strength and conditioning – Dave Redding; Assistant strength and conditioning – Russ Ball

=== Roster ===
1992 Kansas City Chiefs roster
Quarterbacks (QB): 14 Matt Blundin; 17 Dave Krieg; 13 Mark Vlasic; Running backs (RB): 38 Kimble Anders; 48 Todd McNair; 35 Christian Okoye; 44 Harvey Williams KR; 23 Barry Word; Wide receivers (WR): 82 Tim Barnett; 88 J. J. Birden; 84 Willie Davis; 81 Tony Hargain; 83 Michael Smith; Tight ends (TE): 89 Keith Cash; 85 Jonathan Hayes	Offensive linemen (OL): 76 John Alt T; 60 Mike Baab C; 77 Rich Baldinger T; 71 Tom Dohring T; 61 Tim Grunhard C; 65 Kani Kauahi; 72 Dave Lutz G; 79 Dave Szott G; 73 Joe Valerio; Defensive linemen (DL): 98 Leonard Griffin DE; 63 Bill Maas DT; 92 Darren Mickell DE; 75 Joe Phillips DT; 97 Dan Saleaumua DT; 95 Tom Sims DT; 90 Neil Smith DE	Linebackers (LB): 57 Chris Martin OLB; 51 Lonnie Marts OLB; 52 Tracy Rogers OLB; 54 Tracy Simien MLB; 59 Percy Snow MLB; 58 Derrick Thomas OLB; Defensive backs (DB): 30 Martin Bayless SS; 34 Dale Carter; 21 Tahaun Lewis CB; 42 Charles Mincy FS; 24 J. C. Pearson CB; 31 Kevin Ross CB; 32 Doug Terry FS; 46 Bennie Thompson SS; Special teams (ST): 4 Bryan Barker P; 8 Nick Lowery K	Practice squad: 49 Vince Marrow TE; 9 Byron Jackson WR; 53 Santo Stephens LB; Reserve: 50 Erick Anderson LB (IR); 87 Mike Dyal TE (IR); 94 Mike Evans DE (IR); 74 Derrick Graham T (IR); 56 Dino Hackett LB (IR); 80 Fred Jones WR (IR); 91 William Kirksey LB (IR); 29 Albert Lewis CB (IR); 6 Tony Smith WR (NF-Inj.); -- Todd Young TE (IR); 47 active, 10 inactive, 3 practice squad Rookies in italics

== Preseason ==
Week	Date	Opponent	Result	Record	Venue	Attendance	Recap
1	August 8	at Green Bay Packers	L 13–21	0–1	Lambeau Field	54,322	Recap
2	August 15	at Minnesota Vikings	L 0–30	0–2	Hubert H. Humphrey Metrodome	38,132	Recap
3	August 24	Buffalo Bills	W 35–0	1–2	Arrowhead Stadium	71,481	Recap
4	August 28	Indianapolis Colts	L 10–21	1–3	Arrowhead Stadium	65,557	Recap

== Regular season ==
=== Schedule ===
Week	Date	Opponent	Result	Record	Venue	Attendance	Recap
1	September 6	at **San Diego Chargers**	**W** 24–10	1–0	Jack Murphy Stadium	45,024	Recap
2	September 13	**Seattle Seahawks**	**W** 26–7	2–0	Arrowhead Stadium	75,125	Recap
3	September 20	at Houston Oilers	**L** 20–23 (OT)	2–1	Houston Astrodome	60,955	Recap
4	September 28	**Los Angeles Raiders**	**W** 27–7	3–1	Arrowhead Stadium	77,486	Recap
5	October 4	at **Denver Broncos**	**L** 19–20	3–2	Mile High Stadium	75,629	Recap
6	October 11	Philadelphia Eagles	**W** 24–17	4–2	Arrowhead Stadium	76,626	Recap
7	October 18	at Dallas Cowboys	**L** 10–17	4–3	Texas Stadium	64,115	Recap
8	October 25	Pittsburgh Steelers	**L** 3–27	4–4	Arrowhead Stadium	76,175	Recap
9	Bye						
10	November 8	**San Diego Chargers**	**W** 16–14	5–4	Arrowhead Stadium	72,826	Recap
11	November 15	Washington Redskins	**W** 35–16	6–4	Arrowhead Stadium	75,238	Recap
12	November 22	at **Seattle Seahawks**	**W** 24–14	7–4	Kingdome	49,867	Recap
13	November 29	at New York Jets	**W** 23–7	8–4	Giants Stadium	57,375	Recap
14	December 6	at **Los Angeles Raiders**	**L** 7–28	8–5	Los Angeles Memorial Coliseum	45,227	Recap
15	December 13	New England Patriots	**W** 27–20	9–5	Arrowhead Stadium	52,208	Recap
16	December 19	at New York Giants	**L** 21–35	9–6	Giants Stadium	53,428	Recap
17	December 27	**Denver Broncos**	**W** 42–20	10–6	Arrowhead Stadium	76,240	Recap
Note: Intra-division opponents are in **bold** text.

=== Game summaries ===
==== Week 1: at San Diego Chargers ====
Week 1: Kansas City Chiefs at San Diego Chargers – Game summary

Quarter	1	2	3	4	Total
**Chiefs**	7	3	7	7	**24**
Chargers	3	0	0	7	**10**

at Jack Murphy Stadium, San Diego, California

- Date: September 6
- Game time: 3:00 p.m. CDT/1:00 p.m. PDT
- Game weather: Sunny and clear, 74 °F (23 °C)
- Game attendance: 45,024
- Referee: Howard Roe
- TV announcers (NBC): Dick Enberg and Bob Trumpy
- Recap, Game Book

Game information

**First quarter**

- KC – Dale Carter 46-yard punt return (Nick Lowery kick), 13:21. Chiefs 7–0.
- SD – John Carney 45-yard field goal, 1:33. Chiefs 7–3. **Drive: 11 plays, 44 yards, 5:16.**

**Second quarter**

- KC – Nick Lowery 21-yard field goal, 4:59. Chiefs 10–7. **Drive: 11 plays, 45 yards, 6:11.**

**Third quarter**

- KC – Kevin Ross 99-yard interception return (Nick Lowery kick), 1:53. Chiefs 17–7.

**Fourth quarter**

- SD – Rod Bernstine 2-yard run (John Carney kick), 10:24. Chiefs 17–10. **Drive: 7 plays, 68 yards, 3:07.**
- KC – Barry Word 1-yard run (Nick Lowery kick), 1:23. Chiefs 24–10. **Drive: 15 plays, 76 yards, 9:01.**

**Top passers**

- KC – Dave Krieg – 15/25, 154 yards, INT
- SD – Stan Humphries – 7/10, 62 yards, INT

**Top rushers**

- KC – Barry Word – 18 rushes, 37 yards, TD
- SD – Rod Bernstine – 10 rushes, 45 yards, TD

**Top receivers**

- KC – J. J. Birden – 3 receptions, 30 yards
- SD – Ronnie Harmon – 6 receptions, 44 yards

==== Week 2: vs. Seattle Seahawks ====
Week 2: Seattle Seahawks at Kansas City Chiefs – Game summary

Quarter	1	2	3	4	Total
Seahawks	0	7	0	0	**7**
**Chiefs**	7	6	7	6	**26**

at Arrowhead Stadium, Kansas City, Missouri

- Date: September 13
- Game time: 12:00 p.m. CDT
- Game weather: Clear, 77 °F (25 °C)
- Game attendance: 75,125
- Referee: Jerry Markbreit
- TV announcers (NBC): Dan Hicks and Joe Namath
- Recap, Game Book

Game information

**First quarter**

- KC – J. J. Birden 72-yard pass from Dave Krieg (Nick Lowery kick), 13:21. Chiefs 7–0. **Drive: 3 plays, 80 yards, 1:39.**

**Second quarter**

- SEA – Paul Green 3-yard pass from Kelly Stouffer (John Kasay kick), 9:57. Tied 7–7. **Drive: 13 plays, 62 yards, 8:17.**
- KC – Nick Lowery 26-yard field goal, 1:08. Chiefs 10–7. **Drive: 11 plays, 75 yards, 5:01.**
- KC – Nick Lowery 32-yard field goal, 0:06. Chiefs 13–7. **Drive: 3 plays, 50 yards, 0:17.**

**Third quarter**

- KC – Lonnie Marts 36-yard interception return (Nick Lowery kick), 5:07. Chiefs 20–7.

**Fourth quarter**

- KC – Barry Word 2-yard run (kick aborted), 14:16. Chiefs 26–7. **Drive: 6 plays, 14 yards, 3:58.**

**Top passers**

- SEA – Kelly Stouffer – 13/31, 106 yards, TD, 2 INT
- KC – Dave Krieg – 13/19, 231 yards, TD

**Top rushers**

- SEA – Chris Warren – 12 rushes, 53 yards
- KC – Christian Okoye – 18 rushes, 63 yards

**Top receivers**

- SEA – Paul Green – 5 receptions, 41 yards, TD
- KC – J. J. Birden – 1 reception, 72 yards, TD

==== Week 3: at Houston Oilers ====
Week 3: Kansas City Chiefs at Houston Oilers – Game summary

Quarter	1	2	3	4	OT	Total
Chiefs	3	10	0	7	0	**20**
**Oilers**	3	3	0	14	3	**23**

at Astrodome, Houston, Texas

- Date: September 20
- Game time: 12:00 p.m. CDT
- Game weather: None (indoor stadium)
- Game attendance: 60,955
- Referee: Dale Hamer
- TV announcers (NBC): Don Criqui and Paul Maguire
- Recap, Game Book

Game information

**First quarter**

- KC – Nick Lowery 31-yard field goal, 5:46. Chiefs 3–0. **Drive: 7 plays, 42 yards, 2:50.**
- HOU – Al Del Greco 21-yard field goal, 0:00. Tied 3–3. **Drive: 9 plays, 61 yards, 5:46.**

**Second quarter**

- KC – Nick Lowery 52-yard field goal, 8:33. Chiefs 6–3. **Drive: 10 plays, 58 yards, 6:27.**
- KC – Todd McNair 5-yard pass from Dave Krieg (Nick Lowery kick), 0:18. Chiefs 13–3. **Drive: 14 plays, 81 yards, 5:12.**
- HOU – Al Del Greco 54-yard field goal, 0:00. Chiefs 13–6. **Drive: 2 plays, 7 yards, 0:18.**

**Third quarter**

- No scoring plays.

**Fourth quarter**

- HOU – Leonard Harris 8-yard pass from Warren Moon (Al Del Greco kick), 12:39. Tied 13–13. **Drive: 6 plays, 59 yards, 3:16.**
- HOU – Ernest Givins 21-yard pass from Warren Moon (Al Del Greco kick), 3:15. Oilers 20–13. **Drive: 4 plays, 39 yards, 2:09.**
- KC – Todd McNair 4-yard run (Nick Lowery kick), 0:23. Tied 20–20. **Drive: 14 plays, 85 yards, 2:52.**

**Overtime**

- HOU – Al Del Greco 39-yard field goal, 13:05. Oilers 23–20. **Drive: 2 plays, 2 yards, 0:38.**

**Top passers**

- KC – Dave Krieg – 17/30, 177 yards, TD
- HOU – Warren Moon – 19/28, 279 yards, 2 TD, 2 INT

**Top rushers**

- KC – Barry Word – 22 rushes, 114 yards
- HOU – Lorenzo White – 17 rushes, 72 yards

**Top receivers**

- KC – J. J. Birden – 6 receptions, 77 yards
- HOU – Haywood Jeffires – 6 receptions, 84 yards

==== Week 4: vs. Los Angeles Raiders ====
Week 4: Los Angeles Raiders at Kansas City Chiefs – Game summary

Quarter	1	2	3	4	Total
Raiders	0	7	0	0	**7**
**Chiefs**	0	10	0	17	**27**

at Arrowhead Stadium, Kansas City, Missouri

- Date: September 28
- Game time: 8:00 p.m. CDT
- Game weather: Clear, 53 °F (12 °C)
- Game attendance: 77,486
- Referee: Bob McElwee
- TV announcers (ABC): Al Michaels, Frank Gifford and Dan Dierdorf
- Recap, Game Book

Game information

**First quarter**

- No scoring plays.

**Second quarter**

- RAI – Eric Dickerson 40-yard run (Jeff Jaeger kick), 14:46. Raiders 7–0. **Drive: 6 plays, 89 yards, 2:26.**
- KC – Dave Krieg 3-yard run (Nick Lowery kick), 6:03. Tied 7–7. **Drive: 9 plays, 70 yards, 5:39.**
- KC – Nick Lowery 22-yard field goal, 1:03. Chiefs 10–7. **Drive: 8 plays, 36 yards, 3:50.**

**Third quarter**

- No scoring plays.

**Fourth quarter**

- KC – Dave Krieg 7-yard run (Nick Lowery kick), 14:56. Chiefs 17–7. **Drive: 9 plays, 48 yards, 4:49.**
- KC – Nick Lowery 41-yard field goal, 5:36. Chiefs 20–7. **Drive: 10 plays, 27 yards, 6:12.**
- KC – Charles Mincy 25-yard interception return (Nick Lowery kick), 1:52. Chiefs 27–7.

**Top passers**

- RAI – Todd Marinovich – 12/26, 161 yards, 2 INT
- KC – Dave Krieg – 9/18, 80 yards, INT

**Top rushers**

- RAI – Eric Dickerson – 12 rushes, 69 yards, TD
- KC – Barry Word – 27 rushes, 125 yards

**Top receivers**

- RAI – Ethan Horton – 3 receptions, 48 yards
- KC – Todd McNair – 5 reception, 28 yards

==== Week 5: at Denver Broncos ====
Week 5: Kansas City Chiefs at Denver Broncos – Game summary

Quarter	1	2	3	4	Total
Chiefs	0	10	3	6	**19**
**Broncos**	0	3	3	14	**20**

at Mile High Stadium, Denver, Colorado

- Date: October 4
- Game time: 3:00 p.m. CDT/2:00 p.m. MDT
- Game weather: Sunny, 76 °F (24 °C)
- Game attendance: 75,629
- Referee: Ed Hochuli
- TV announcers (NBC): Charlie Jones and Todd Christensen
- Recap, Game Book

Game information

**First quarter**

- No scoring plays.

**Second quarter**

- KC – Willie Davis 50-yard pass from Dave Krieg (Nick Lowery kick), 12:12. Chiefs 7–0. **Drive: 8 plays, 94 yards, 5:15.**
- DEN – David Treadwell 36-yard field goal, 5:10. Chiefs 7–3. **Drive: 12 plays, 60 yards, 7:02.**
- KC – Nick Lowery 44-yard field goal, 0:00. Chiefs 10–3. **Drive: 7 plays, 51 yards, 1:25.**

**Third quarter**

- KC – Nick Lowery 36-yard field goal, 11:19. Chiefs 13–3. **Drive: 7 plays, 62 yards, 3:41.**
- DEN – David Treadwell 22-yard field goal, 7:51. Chiefs 13–6. **Drive: 8 plays, 75 yards, 3:28.**

**Fourth quarter**

- KC – Nick Lowery 26-yard field goal, 6:16. Chiefs 16–6. **Drive: 13 plays, 60 yards, 8:25.**
- KC – Nick Lowery 33-yard field goal, 5:00. Chiefs 19–6. **Drive: 4 plays, 1 yard, 0:59.**
- DEN – Mark Jackson 25-yard pass from John Elway (David Treadwell kick), 1:55. Chiefs 19–13. **Drive: 14 plays, 80 yards, 3:05.**
- DEN – Vance Johnson 12-yard pass from John Elway (David Treadwell kick), 0:38. Broncos 20–19. **Drive: 3 plays, 27 yards, 0:39.**

**Top passers**

- KC – Dave Krieg – 22/31, 301 yards, TD
- DEN – John Elway – 23/38, 311 yards, 2 TD

**Top rushers**

- KC – Barry Word – 21 rushes, 84 yards
- DEN – Reggie Rivers – 6 rushes, 34 yards

**Top receivers**

- KC – Willie Davis – 5 receptions, 127 yards, TD
- DEN – Shannon Sharpe – 9 receptions, 118 yards

==== Week 6: vs. Philadelphia Eagles ====
Week 6: Philadelphia Eagles at Kansas City Chiefs – Game summary

Quarter	1	2	3	4	Total
Eagles	0	3	0	14	**17**
**Chiefs**	7	7	7	3	**24**

at Arrowhead Stadium, Kansas City, Missouri

- Date: October 11
- Game time: 12:00 p.m. CDT
- Game weather: Clear, 59 °F (15 °C)
- Game attendance: 76,626
- Referee: Dick Hantak
- TV announcers (CBS): Verne Lundquist and Dan Fouts
- Recap, Game Book

Game information

**First quarter**

- KC – J. J. Birden 43-yard pass from Dave Krieg (Nick Lowery kick), 13:22. Chiefs 7–0. **Drive: 5 plays, 72 yards, 1:38.**

**Second quarter**

- PHI – Roger Ruzek 49-yard field goal, 11:21. Chiefs 7–3. **Drive: 11 plays, 53 yards, 7:08.**
- KC – J. J. Birden 24-yard pass from Dave Krieg (Nick Lowery kick), 0:20. Chiefs 14–3. **Drive: 2 plays, 31 yards, 0:12.**

**Third quarter**

- KC – Willie Davis 74-yard pass from Dave Krieg (Nick Lowery kick), 6:32. Chiefs 21–3. **Drive: 1 play, 74 yards, 0:08.**

**Fourth quarter**

- KC – Nick Lowery 20-yard field goal, 12:47. Chiefs 24–3. **Drive: 7 plays, 57 yards, 3:51.**
- PHI – Pat Beach 10-yard pass from Randall Cunningham (Roger Ruzek kick), 10:18. Chiefs 24–10. **Drive: 4 plays, 80 yards, 2:29.**
- PHI – Pat Beach 3-yard pass from Randall Cunningham (Roger Ruzek kick), 6:05. Chiefs 24–17. **Drive: 3 plays, 10 yards, 0:51.**

**Top passers**

- PHI – Randall Cunningham – 16/27, 168 yards, 2 TD, 2 INT
- KC – Dave Krieg – 12/26, 272 yards, 3 TD, INT

**Top rushers**

- PHI – Herschel Walker – 19 rushes, 89 yards
- KC – Christian Okoye – 16 rushes, 48 yards

**Top receivers**

- PHI – Fred Barnett – 6 receptions, 86 yards
- KC – Willie Davis – 5 receptions, 167 yards, TD

The win over the Eagles ended the longest ever gap between two NFL teams meeting, it was the first occasion the Chiefs had opposed the Eagles since October 22, 1972, and only their second-ever matchup. This occurred because in previous seasons when the AFC West and NFC East met each other, either the Chiefs or the Eagles (but never both) finished in fifth position and did not play the ordinary set of interconference games.

==== Week 7: at Dallas Cowboys ====
Week 7: Kansas City Chiefs at Dallas Cowboys – Game summary

Quarter	1	2	3	4	Total
Chiefs	3	7	0	0	**10**
**Cowboys**	7	7	3	0	**17**

at Texas Stadium, Irving, Texas

- Date: October 18
- Game time: 12:00 p.m. CDT
- Game weather: Clear skies, 65 °F (18 °C)
- Game attendance: 64,115
- Referee: Johnny Grier
- TV announcers (NBC): Dick Enberg and Bob Trumpy
- Recap, Game Book

Game information

**First quarter**

- KC – Nick Lowery 32-yard field goal, 6:30. Chiefs 3–0. **Drive: 15 plays, 65 yards, 8:30.**
- DAL – Daryl Johnston 2-yard pass from Troy Aikman (Lin Elliott kick), 1:03. Cowboys 7–3. **Drive: 8 plays, 78 yards, 5:27.**

**Second quarter**

- DAL – Emmitt Smith 2-yard run (Lin Elliott kick), 11:03. Cowboys 14–3. **Drive: 8 plays, 59 yards, 3:44.**
- KC – Barry Word 2-yard run (Nick Lowery kick), 1:57. Cowboys 14–10. **Drive: 15 plays, 77 yards, 9:08.**

**Third quarter**

- DAL – Lin Elliott 39-yard field goal, 7:24. Cowboys 17–10. **Drive: 4 plays, 7 yards, 2:23.**

**Fourth quarter**

- No scoring plays.

**Top passers**

- KC – Dave Krieg – 16/31, 170 yards, INT
- DAL – Troy Aikman – 21/29, 192 yards, TD, 2 INT

**Top rushers**

- KC – Barry Word – 13 rushes, 46 yards, TD
- DAL – Emmitt Smith – 24 rushes, 95 yards, TD

**Top receivers**

- KC – Willie Davis – 6 receptions, 100 yards
- DAL – Michael Irvin – 6 receptions, 84 yards

==== Week 8: vs. Pittsburgh Steelers ====
Week 8: Pittsburgh Steelers at Kansas City Chiefs – Game summary

Quarter	1	2	3	4	Total
**Steelers**	7	6	7	7	**27**
Chiefs	0	3	0	0	**3**

at Arrowhead Stadium, Kansas City, Missouri

- Date: October 25
- Game time: 6:30 p.m. CST
- Game weather: Clear, 68 °F (20 °C)
- Game attendance: 76,175
- Referee: Tom White
- TV announcers (TNT): Gary Bender and Pat Haden
- Recap, Game Book

Game information

**First quarter**

- PIT – Rod Woodson 80-yard punt return (Gary Anderson kick), 7:01. Steelers 7–0.

**Second quarter**

- PIT – Gary Anderson 49-yard field goal, 13:18. Steelers 10–0. **Drive: 12 plays, 48 yards, 6:09.**
- PIT – Gary Anderson 30-yard field goal, 5:55. Steelers 13–0. **Drive: 11 plays, 54 yards, 5:47.**
- KC – Eddie Murray 52-yard field goal, 0:26. Steelers 13–3. **Drive: 6 plays, 28 yards, 0:49.**

**Third quarter**

- PIT – Barry Foster 4-yard run (Gary Anderson kick), 3:17. Steelers 20–3. **Drive: 2 plays, 2 yards, 0:43.**

**Fourth quarter**

- PIT – Eric Green 4-yard pass from Neil O'Donnell (Gary Anderson kick), 6:05. Steelers 27–3. **Drive: 12 plays, 65 yards, 8:17.**

**Top passers**

- PIT – Neil O'Donnell – 13/22, 114 yards, TD
- KC – Dave Krieg – 9/27, 82 yards, 3 INT

**Top rushers**

- PIT – Barry Foster – 24 rushes, 105 yards, TD
- KC – Christian Okoye – 11 rushes, 73 yards

**Top receivers**

- PIT – Leroy Thompson – 4 receptions, 47 yards
- KC – J. J. Birden – 4 receptions, 46 yards

==== Week 10: vs. San Diego Chargers ====
Week 10: San Diego Chargers at Kansas City Chiefs – Game summary

Quarter	1	2	3	4	Total
Chargers	0	0	7	7	**14**
**Chiefs**	3	10	0	3	**16**

at Arrowhead Stadium, Kansas City, Missouri

- Date: November 8
- Game time: 3:00 p.m. CST
- Game weather: Mostly cloudy, 60 °F (16 °C)
- Game attendance: 72,826
- Referee: Bernie Kukar
- TV announcers (NBC): Joel Meyers and Beasley Reece
- Recap, Game Book

Game information

**First quarter**

- KC – Nick Lowery 47-yard field goal, 4:42. Chiefs 3–0. **Drive: 13 plays, 32 yards, 7:41.**

**Second quarter**

- KC – Christian Okoye 2-yard run (Nick Lowery kick), 14:57. Chiefs 10–0. **Drive: 5 plays, 15 yards, 2:20.**
- KC – Nick Lowery 35-yard field goal, 1:11. Chiefs 13–0. **Drive: 4 plays, 5 yards, 1:10.**

**Third quarter**

- SD – Derrick Walker 14-yard pass from Stan Humphries (John Carney kick), 2:55. Chiefs 13–7. **Drive: 8 plays, 80 yards, 3:59.**

**Fourth quarter**

- SD – Marion Butts 1-yard run (John Carney kick), 13:28. Chargers 14–13. **Drive: 9 plays, 90 yards, 2:35.**
- KC – Nick Lowery 36-yard field goal, 0:54. Chiefs 16–14. **Drive: 7 plays, 49 yards, 2:24.**

**Top passers**

- SD – Stan Humphries – 20/35, 294 yards, TD, INT
- KC – Dave Krieg – 10/28, 114 yards

**Top rushers**

- SD – Marion Butts – 17 rushes, 37 yards, TD
- KC – Christian Okoye – 19 rushes, 38 yards, TD

**Top receivers**

- SD – Ronnie Harmon – 7 receptions, 96 yards
- KC – Willie Davis – 2 receptions, 36 yards

==== Week 11: vs. Washington Redskins ====
Week 11: Washington Redskins at Kansas City Chiefs – Game summary

Quarter	1	2	3	4	Total
Redskins	0	0	13	3	**16**
**Chiefs**	7	21	0	7	**35**

at Arrowhead Stadium, Kansas City, Missouri

- Date: November 15
- Game time: 12:00 p.m. CST
- Game weather: Clear, 52 °F (11 °C)
- Game attendance: 75,238
- Referee: Pat Haggerty
- TV announcers (CBS): Pat Summerall and John Madden
- Recap, Game Book

Game information

**First quarter**

- KC – Christian Okoye 2-yard run (Nick Lowery kick), 5:20. Chiefs 7–0. **Drive: 11 plays, 60 yards, 6:37.**

**Second quarter**

- KC – Tim Barnett 44-yard pass from Dave Krieg (Nick Lowery kick), 14:53. Chiefs 14–0. **Drive: 1 play, 44 yards, 0:07.**
- KC – Christian Okoye 3-yard run (Nick Lowery kick), 6:22. Chiefs 21–0. **Drive: 11 plays, 83 yards, 6:35.**
- KC – Harvey Williams 5-yard run (Nick Lowery kick), 0:37. Chiefs 28–0. **Drive: 13 plays, 88 yards, 3:36.**

**Third quarter**

- WAS – Ricky Ervins 5-yard run (Chip Lohmiller kick), 8:27. Chiefs 28–7. **Drive: 11 plays, 75 yards, 4:38.**
- WAS – Chip Lohmiller 40-yard field goal, 4:15. Chiefs 28–10. **Drive: 9 plays, 31 yards, 2:55.**
- WAS – Chip Lohmiller 26-yard field goal, 0:22. Chiefs 28–13. **Drive: 8 plays, 49 yards, 1:53.**

**Fourth quarter**

- WAS – Chip Lohmiller 38-yard field goal, 13:30. Chiefs 28–16. **Drive: 4 plays, –1 yard, 1:23.**
- KC – Tim Barnett 35-yard pass from Dave Krieg (Nick Lowery kick), 4:08. Chiefs 35–16. **Drive: 8 plays, 60 yards, 4:05.**

**Top passers**

- WAS – Mark Rypien – 23/41, 217 yards, INT
- KC – Dave Krieg – 19/29, 302 yards, 2 TD, INT

**Top rushers**

- WAS – Brian Mitchell – 1 rush, 33 yards
- KC – Harvey Williams – 19 rushes, 88 yards, TD

**Top receivers**

- WAS – Ricky Sanders – 5 receptions, 71 yards
- KC – Tim Barnett – 6 receptions, 148 yards, 2 TD

==== Week 12: at Seattle Seahawks ====
Week 12: Kansas City Chiefs at Seattle Seahawks – Game summary

Quarter	1	2	3	4	Total
**Chiefs**	10	7	7	0	**24**
Seahawks	0	7	7	0	**14**

at Kingdome, Seattle, Washington

- Date: November 22
- Game time: 7:00 p.m. CST/5:00 p.m. PST
- Game weather: None (indoor stadium)
- Game attendance: 49,867
- Referee: Howard Roe
- TV announcers (ESPN): Mike Patrick and Joe Theismann
- Recap, Game Book

Game information

**First quarter**

- KC – Barry Word 44-yard run (Nick Lowery kick), 10:50. Chiefs 7–0. **Drive: 4 plays, 55 yards, 2:31.**
- KC – Nick Lowery 20-yard field goal, 0:51. Chiefs 10–0. **Drive: 12 plays, 73 yards, 6:37.**

**Second quarter**

- SEA – Tommy Kane 35-yard pass from Kelly Stouffer (John Kasay kick), 13:35. Chiefs 10–7. **Drive: 6 plays, 55 yards, 2:16.**
- KC – Dale Carter 86-yard punt return (John Kasay kick), 3:37. Chiefs 17–7.

**Third quarter**

- KC – Neil Smith 22-yard interception return (Nick Lowery kick), 7:35. Chiefs 24–7.
- SEA – Chris Warren 6-yard run (John Kasay kick), 2:52. Chiefs 24–14. **Drive: 6 plays, 68 yards, 4:43.**

**Fourth quarter**

- No scoring plays.

**Top passers**

- KC – Dave Krieg – 11/15, 103 yards
- SEA – Kelly Stouffer – 13/30, 164 yards, TD, 4 INT

**Top rushers**

- KC – Barry Word – 19 rushes, 85 yards, TD
- SEA – Chris Warren – 20 rushes, 154 yards, TD

**Top receivers**

- KC – Tim Barnett – 2 receptions, 30 yards
- SEA – Tommy Kane – 5 receptions, 65 yards, TD

==== Week 13: at New York Jets ====
Week 13: Kansas City Chiefs at New York Jets – Game summary

Quarter	1	2	3	4	Total
**Chiefs**	3	3	14	3	**23**
Jets	0	0	0	7	**7**

at Giants Stadium, East Rutherford, New Jersey

- Date: November 29
- Game time: 1:00 p.m. EST/12:00 p.m. CST
- Game weather: Cloudy/overcast, 44 °F (7 °C)
- Game attendance: 57,375
- Referee: Bob McElwee
- TV announcers (NBC): Marv Albert and Bill Parcells
- Recap, Game Book

Game information

**First quarter**

- KC – Nick Lowery 20-yard field goal, 4:11. Chiefs 3–0. **Drive: 15 plays, 78 yards, 8:44.**

**Second quarter**

- KC – Nick Lowery 27-yard field goal, 4:36. Chiefs 6–0. **Drive: 10 plays, 57 yards, 6:13.**

**Third quarter**

- KC – Keith Cash 2-yard pass from Dave Krieg (Nick Lowery kick), 10:33. Chiefs 13–0. **Drive: 8 plays, 75 yards, 4:27.**
- KC – Tim Barnett 4-yard pass from Dave Krieg (Nick Lowery kick), 5:07. Chiefs 20–0. **Drive: 7 plays, 65 yards, 4:12.**

**Fourth quarter**

- NYJ – Terance Mathis 10-yard pass from Browning Nagle (Cary Blanchard kick), 10:02. Chiefs 20–7. **Drive: 8 plays, 51 yards, 2:17.**
- KC – Nick Lowery 38-yard field goal, 4:17. Chiefs 23–7. **Drive: 8 plays, 25 yards, 5:45.**

**Top passers**

- KC – Dave Krieg – 17/21, 222 yards, 2 TD
- NYJ – Browning Nagle – 13/27, 146 yards, TD

**Top rushers**

- KC – Harvey Williams – 15 rushes, 42 yards
- NYJ – Brad Baxter – 15 rushes, 57 yards

**Top receivers**

- KC – Willie Davis – 3 receptions, 79 yards
- NYJ – Chris Burkett – 5 receptions, 65 yards

==== Week 14: at Los Angeles Raiders ====
Week 14: Kansas City Chiefs at Los Angeles Raiders – Game summary

Quarter	1	2	3	4	Total
Chiefs	0	7	0	0	**7**
**Raiders**	14	7	7	0	**28**

at Los Angeles Memorial Coliseum, Los Angeles, California

- Date: December 6
- Game time: 3:00 p.m. CST/1:00 p.m. PST
- Game weather: Cloudy, 61 °F (16 °C)
- Game attendance: 45,227
- Referee: Ed Hochuli
- TV announcers (NBC): Don Criqui and Paul Maguire
- Recap, Game Book

Game information

**First quarter**

- RAI – Ethan Horton 6-yard pass from Jay Schroeder (Jeff Jaeger kick), 7:26. Raiders 7–0. **Drive: 10 plays, 57 yards, 5:44.**
- RAI – Elvis Patterson blocked punt recovery in endzone (Jeff Jaeger kick), 5:04. Raiders 14–0.

**Second quarter**

- RAI – Steve Smith 11-yard pass from Jay Schroeder (Jeff Jaeger kick), 6:18. Raiders 21–0. **Drive: 7 plays, 35 yards, 4:44.**
- KC – Keith Cash 2-yard pass from Dave Krieg (Nick Lowery kick), 1:07. Raiders 21–7. **Drive: 6 plays, 88 yards, 2:27.**

**Third quarter**

- RAI – Willie Gault 17-yard pass from Jay Schroeder (Jeff Jaeger kick), 0:19. Raiders 28–7. **Drive: 6 plays, 46 yards, 3:50.**

**Fourth quarter**

- No scoring plays.

**Top passers**

- KC – Dave Krieg – 18/33, 276 yards, TD, INT
- RAI – Jay Schroeder – 12/18, 93 yards, 3 TD, 2 INT

**Top rushers**

- KC – Todd McNair – 4 rushes, 16 yards
- RAI – Eric Dickerson – 23 rushes, 77 yards

**Top receivers**

- KC – J. J. Birden – 5 receptions, 88 yards
- RAI – Steve Smith – 4 receptions, 39 yards, TD

==== Week 15: vs. New England Patriots ====
Week 15: New England Patriots at Kansas City Chiefs – Game summary

Quarter	1	2	3	4	Total
Patriots	13	0	0	7	**20**
**Chiefs**	3	3	7	14	**27**

at Arrowhead Stadium, Kansas City, Missouri

- Date: December 20
- Game time: 12:00 p.m. CST
- Game weather: Overcast, 42 °F (6 °C)
- Game attendance: 52,208
- Referee: Larry Nemmers
- TV announcers (NBC): Don Criqui and Paul Maguire
- Recap, Game Book

Game information

**First quarter**

- NE – Tim Goad 19-yard fumble return (Charlie Baumann kick), 14:42. Patriots 7–0.
- KC – Nick Lowery 30-yard field goal, 8:06. Patriots 7–3. **Drive: 9 plays, 19 yards, 4:43.**
- NE – Leonard Russell 3-yard run (kick aborted), 3:45. Patriots 13–3. **Drive: 2 plays, 8 yards, 0:47.**

**Second quarter**

- KC – Nick Lowery 26-yard field goal, 11:52. Patriots 13–6. **Drive: 11 plays, 59 yards, 6:53.**

**Third quarter**

- KC – Christian Okoye 1-yard run (Nick Lowery kick), 5:30. Tied 13–13. **Drive: 7 plays, 79 yards, 4:09.**

**Fourth quarter**

- KC – Charles Mincy 30-yard fumble return (Nick Lowery kick), 14:38. Chiefs 20–13.
- KC – Willie Davis 43-yard pass from Dave Krieg (Nick Lowery kick), 10:20. Chiefs 27–13. **Drive: 4 plays, 63 yards, 2:28.**
- NE – Kevin Turner 6-yard pass from Jeff Carlson (Charlie Baumann kick), 7:14. Chiefs 27–20. **Drive: 6 plays, 56 yards, 3:06.**

**Top passers**

- NE – Scott Zolak – 5/10, 65 yards
- KC – Dave Krieg – 10/21, 196 yards, TD

**Top rushers**

- NE – John Stephens – 9 rushes, 37 yards
- KC – Christian Okoye – 27 rushes, 86 yards, TD

**Top receivers**

- NE – Irving Fryar – 2 receptions, 48 yards
- KC – Fred Jones – 1 reception, 56 yards

==== Week 16: at New York Giants ====
Week 16: Kansas City Chiefs at New York Giants – Game summary

Quarter	1	2	3	4	Total
Chiefs	0	7	7	7	**21**
**Giants**	14	7	14	0	**35**

at Giants Stadium, East Rutherford, New Jersey

- Date: December 19
- Game time: 12:30 p.m. EST/11:30 a.m. CST
- Game weather: Cloudy and overcast, 45 °F (7 °C)
- Game attendance: 53,428
- Referee: Pat Haggerty
- TV announcers (NBC): Dick Enberg and Bob Trumpy
- Recap, Game Book

Game information

**First quarter**

- NYG – Mark Ingram 21-yard pass from Jeff Hostetler (Ken Willis kick), 2:01. Giants 7–0. **Drive: 7 plays, 70 yards, 3:29.**
- NYG – Rodney Hampton 2-yard run (Ken Willis kick), 0:16. Giants 14–0. **Drive: 2 plays, 4 yards, 0:38.**

**Second quarter**

- KC – Christian Okoye 1-yard run (Nick Lowery kick), 7:14. Giants 14–7. **Drive: 13 plays, 77 yards, 8:02.**
- NYG – Chris Calloway 15-yard pass from Jeff Hostetler (Ken Willis kick), 0:18. Giants 21–7. **Drive: 13 plays, 70 yards, 6:56.**

**Third quarter**

- NYG – Rodney Hampton 1-yard run (Ken Willis kick), 8:53. Giants 28–7. **Drive: 6 plays, 82 yards, 3:08.**
- NYG – Rodney Hampton 20-yard run (Ken Willis kick), 5:11. Giants 35–7. **Drive: 5 plays, 49 yards, 2:06.**
- KC – Tim Barnett 77-yard pass from Dave Krieg (Nick Lowery kick), 4:46. Giants 35–14. **Drive: 2 plays, 77 yards, 0:25.**

**Fourth quarter**

- KC – Tracy Rogers blocked punt recovery in endzone (Nick Lowery kick), 3:40. Giants 35–21.

**Top passers**

- KC – Dave Krieg – 18/34, 259 yards, TD, 2 INT
- NYG – Jeff Hostetler – 10/16, 131 yards, 2 TD

**Top rushers**

- KC – Christian Okoye – 11 rushes, 36 yards, TD
- NYG – Rodney Hampton – 18 rushes, 84 yards, 3 TD

**Top receivers**

- KC – Tim Barnett – 1 reception, 77 yards, TD
- NYG – Chris Calloway – 4 receptions, 54 yards, TD

==== Week 17: vs. Denver Broncos ====
Week 17: Denver Broncos at Kansas City Chiefs – Game summary

Quarter	1	2	3	4	Total
Broncos	7	0	3	10	**20**
**Chiefs**	0	14	7	21	**42**

at Arrowhead Stadium, Kansas City, Missouri

- Date: December 27
- Game time: 12:00 p.m. CST
- Game weather: Clear, 45 °F (7 °C)
- Game attendance: 76,240
- Referee: Johnny Grier
- TV announcers (NBC): Dick Enberg and Bob Trumpy
- Recap, Game Book

Game information

**First quarter**

- DEN – Reggie Johnson 12-yard pass from John Elway (David Treadwell kick), 1:05. Broncos 7–0. **Drive: 6 plays, 87 yards, 2:08.**

**Second quarter**

- KC – Jonathan Hayes 12-yard pass from Dave Krieg (Nick Lowery kick), 7:19. Tied 7–7. **Drive: 8 plays, 44 yards, 4:34.**
- KC – Charles Mincy 32-yard interception return (Nick Lowery kick), 4:19. Chiefs 14–7.

**Third quarter**

- KC – Dale Carter 36-yard interception return (Nick Lowery kick), 13:09. Chiefs 21–7.
- DEN – David Treadwell 27-yard field goal, 8:38. Chiefs 21–10. **Drive: 9 plays, 71 yards, 4:31.**

**Fourth quarter**

- DEN – David Treadwell 19-yard field goal, 14:11. Chiefs 21–13. **Drive: 4 plays, 5 yards, 1:30.**
- KC – Derrick Thomas fumble recovery in end zone (Nick Lowery kick), 12:28. Chiefs 28–13.
- KC – Jonathan Hayes 5-yard pass from Dave Krieg (Nick Lowery kick), 7:11. Chiefs 35–13. **Drive: 3 plays, 13 yards, 1:43.**
- DEN – Greg Lewis 1-yard run (David Treadwell kick), 4:07. Chiefs 35–20. **Drive: 6 plays, 78 yards, 3:04.**
- KC – Christian Okoye 8-yard run (Nick Lowery kick), 3:55. Chiefs 42–20. **Drive: 1 play, 8 yards, 0:12.**

**Top passers**

- DEN – John Elway – 16/32, 211 yards, TD, 2 INT
- KC – Dave Krieg – 14/25, 176 yards, 2 TD, INT

**Top rushers**

- DEN – Gaston Green – 12 rushes, 30 yards
- KC – Harvey Williams – 14 rushes, 46 yards

**Top receivers**

- DEN – Shannon Sharpe – 5 receptions, 87 yards
- KC – Willie Davis – 1 reception, 45 yards

=== Standings ===
AFC West
	W	L	T	PCT	DIV	CONF	PF	PA	STK
^{(3)} San Diego Chargers	11	5	0	.688	5–3	9–5	335	241	W7
^{(6)} Kansas City Chiefs	10	6	0	.625	6–2	8–4	348	282	W1
Denver Broncos	8	8	0	.500	4–4	7–5	262	329	L1
Los Angeles Raiders	7	9	0	.438	4–4	5–7	249	281	W1
Seattle Seahawks	2	14	0	.125	1–7	2–10	140	312	L4

== Postseason ==
=== Schedule ===
Round	Date	Opponent (seed)	Result	Record	Venue	Attendance	Recap
Wild Card	January 2, 1993	at San Diego Chargers (3)	L 0–17	0–1	Jack Murphy Stadium	58,278	Recap

=== Game summaries ===
==== AFC Wild Card Playoffs: at (3) San Diego Chargers ====
AFC Wild Card Playoffs: (6) Kansas City Chiefs at (3) San Diego Chargers – Game summary

Quarter	1	2	3	4	Total
Chiefs	0	0	0	0	0
Chargers	0	0	10	7	17

at Jack Murphy Stadium, San Diego, California

- Date: January 2
- Game time: 3:00 p.m. CST/1:00 p.m. PST
- Game weather: Showers, 57 °F (14 °C)
- Game attendance: 58,278
- Referee: Dick Hantak
- TV announcers (ABC): Brent Musburger, Dick Vermeil and Lynn Swann
- Recap, Game Book

Game information

First quarter

- No scoring plays.

Second quarter

- No scoring plays.

Third quarter

- SD – Marion Butts 54-yard run (John Carney kick), 5:53. Chargers 7–0. Drive: 4 plays, 74 yards, 1:57.
- SD – John Carney 34-yard field goal, 3:33. Chargers 10–0. Drive: 4 plays, 9 yards, 2:03.

Fourth quarter

- SD – Steve Hendrickson 5-yard run (John Carney kick), 4:57. Chargers 17–0. Drive: 11 plays, 91 yards, 5:32.

Top passers

- KC – Dave Krieg – 16/34, 233 yards, 2 INT
- SD – Stan Humphries – 14/23, 199 yards

Top rushers

- KC – Harvey Williams – 12 rushes, 35 yards
- SD – Marion Butts – 15 rushes, 119 yards, TD

Top receivers

- KC – J. J. Birden – 4 receptions, 78 yards
- SD – Derrick Walker – 3 receptions, 60 yards
