= 1991 Kansas City Chiefs season =

NFL team season

- Owner: Lamar Hunt
- General manager: Carl Peterson
- Head coach: Marty Schottenheimer
- Offensive coordinator: Joe Pendry
- Defensive coordinator: Bill Cowher
- Home stadium: Arrowhead Stadium

Results
- Record: 10–6
- Division place: 2nd AFC West
- Playoffs: Won Wild Card Playoffs (vs. Raiders) 10–6; Lost Divisional Playoffs (at Bills) 14–37
- All-Pros: 1: LB Derrick Thomas (1st team)
- Pro Bowlers: 3: FB Christian Okoye; DE Neil Smith; LB Derrick Thomas

The 1991 Kansas City Chiefs season was the franchise's 22nd season in the National Football League and 32nd overall. They failed to improve on their 11–5 record from 1990 and finished with a 10–6 record. Compared to the Chiefs' 1990 campaign, Steve DeBerg’s consistency had dropped. The running game made up for lower passing production as Christian Okoye ran for 1,031 yards for the season, Barry Word was productive, and rookie Harvey Williams was outstanding in limited playing time. The Chiefs defeated their division rival, the Los Angeles Raiders in the Wild Card round, resulting in the franchise's first playoff victory since Super Bowl IV in 1970. The next week, the Chiefs lost to the Buffalo Bills in the divisional playoffs.

The season began on July 27 when Jan Stenerud, the hero of Super Bowl IV, was inducted into the Pro Football Hall of Fame.

The Chiefs opened the regular season with one win and two losses in their first three games, but rebounded to win the next four games, including an October 7 game in which the Chiefs trounced the Buffalo Bills 33–6. It was the Chiefs' first home Monday Night Football game since 1983. On October 13, The Chiefs blasted the Miami Dolphins 42–7 as Christian Okoye ran for 153 yards.

On December 22, the Chiefs won 27–21 against the Raiders. The victory gave the Chiefs a home playoff game against the Raiders; a loss would have meant playing in Los Angeles again the following week. It was the first playoff game in Kansas City in 20 years. The Chiefs 10–6 victory over the Raiders in the playoffs was the franchise's first postseason victory since the AFL-NFL merger.

Quarterback Steve DeBerg completed 14 of 20 passes for 227 yards and two touchdowns. Barry Word rushed for 152 yards, and J. J. Birden caught eight passes for 188 yards and two touchdowns. During the game, the Chiefs didn't have to punt and held possession of the ball for almost 40 minutes.

== Offseason ==
=== Draft ===
1991 Kansas City Chiefs draft
Round	Pick	Player	Position	College	Notes
1	21	Harvey Williams	Running back	LSU	
2	50	Joe Valerio	Center	Pennsylvania	
3	77	Tim Barnett	Wide receiver	Jackson State	
5	133	Charles Mincy	Defensive back	Washington	
6	162	Darrell Malone	Defensive back	Jacksonville State	
7	189	Bernard Ellison	Defensive back	Nevada	
8	218	Tom Dohring	Offensive tackle	Michigan	
9	244	Robbie Keen	Placekicker	California	
10	273	Eric Ramsey	Defensive back	Auburn	
11	300	Bobby Olive	Wide receiver	Ohio State	
12	329	Ron Shipley	Guard	New Mexico	
Made roster

== Personnel ==
=== Staff ===
1991 Kansas City Chiefs staff
Front office: Founder – Lamar Hunt; Chairman of the Board – Jack Steadman; President/General Manager/Chief Executive Officer – Carl Peterson; Assistant General Manager – Dennis Thum; Director of Player Personnel – Whitey Dovell; Director of Pro Personnel – Mark Hatley; Head coaches: Head Coach – Marty Schottenheimer; Offensive coaches: Offensive Coordinator – Joe Pendry; Running Backs – Bruce Arians; Wide Receivers – Al Saunders; Offensive Line – Howard Mudd; Offense/Tight Ends – Jim Erkenbeck	Defensive coaches: Defensive Coordinator/Linebackers - Bill Cowher; Defensive Line – Tom Pratt; Defensive Backs – Tony Dungy; Special Assistant/Quality Control – Darvin Wallis; Special teams coaches: Special Teams – Kurt Schottenheimer; Strength and conditioning: Strength and Conditioning – Dave Redding; Assistant Strength and Conditioning – Russ Ball

=== Roster ===
1991 Kansas City Chiefs roster
Quarterbacks (QB): 17 Steve DeBerg; 11 Steve Pelluer; 13 Mark Vlasic; Running backs (RB): 43 Bill Jones; 48 Todd McNair; 35 Christian Okoye; 21 James Saxon; 25 Troy Stradford; 22 Harvey Williams; 23 Barry Word; Wide receivers (WR): 82 Tim Barnett; 88 J. J. Birden; 86 Emile Harry; 80 Fred Jones; 81 Robb Thomas; Tight ends (TE): 85 Jonathan Hayes; 89 Pete Holohan	Offensive linemen (OL): 76 John Alt T; 77 Rich Baldinger T; 74 Derrick Graham T; 61 Tim Grunhard C; 72 Dave Lutz G; 79 Dave Szott G; 73 Joe Valerio C; 65 Frank Winters C/G; Defensive linemen (DL): 98 Leonard Griffin DE; 63 Bill Maas DE; 97 Dan Saleaumua NT; 95 Tom Sims NT; 90 Neil Smith DE	Linebackers (LB): 56 Dino Hackett ILB; 57 Chris Martin OLB; 51 Lonnie Marts OLB; 55 Ervin Randle ILB; 52 Tracy Rogers ILB; 54 Tracy Simien ILB; 58 Derrick Thomas OLB; Defensive backs (DB): 34 Lloyd Burruss SS; 20 Deron Cherry FS; 39 Eric Everett CB; 41 Anthony Parker CB; 24 J. C. Pearson CB; 27 Kevin Porter SS; 31 Kevin Ross CB; 46 Charles Washington FS; Special teams (ST): 4 Bryan Barker P; 8 Nick Lowery K	Practice squad: 84 Willie Davis WR; 87 Craig Hudson TE; 5 Bobby Olive WR; 92 Stephon Weatherspoon LB; Reserve: 38 Kimble Anders RB (IR); -- Clifford Charlton LB (IR); 71 Tom Dohring T (IR); 38 Bernard Ellison CB (NF-Inj.); 29 Albert Lewis CB (IR); 42 Charles Mincy S (IR); 30 Stump Mitchell RB (IR); 83 Stephone Paige WR (IR); 59 Percy Snow LB (NF-Inj.); 47 active, 9 inactive, 4 practice squad Rookies in italics

== Preseason ==
Week	Date	Opponent	Result	Record	Venue	Attendance	Recap
1	August 3	Dallas Cowboys	L 14–24	0–1	Arrowhead Stadium	56,038	Recap
2	August 10	vs. New York Jets	W 19–10	1–1	Busch Memorial Stadium (St. Louis, MO)	52,935	Recap
3	August 17	Detroit Lions	W 38–14	2–1	Arrowhead Stadium	57,320	Recap
4	August 23	at Tampa Bay Buccaneers	L 7–20	2–2	Tampa Stadium	33,996	Recap

== Regular season ==
=== Schedule ===
Week	Date	Opponent	Result	Record	Venue	Attendance	Recap
1	September 1	Atlanta Falcons	**W** 14–3	1–0	Arrowhead Stadium	74,246	Recap
2	September 8	New Orleans Saints	**L** 10–17	1–1	Arrowhead Stadium	74,816	Recap
3	September 16	at Houston Oilers	**L** 7–17	1–2	Houston Astrodome	61,058	Recap
4	September 22	**Seattle Seahawks**	**W** 20–13	2–2	Arrowhead Stadium	71,789	Recap
5	September 29	at **San Diego Chargers**	**W** 14–13	3–2	Jack Murphy Stadium	44,907	Recap
6	October 7	Buffalo Bills	**W** 33–6	4–2	Arrowhead Stadium	76,120	Recap
7	October 13	Miami Dolphins	**W** 42–7	5–2	Arrowhead Stadium	76,021	Recap
8	October 20	at **Denver Broncos**	**L** 16–19	5–3	Mile High Stadium	75,866	Recap
9	October 28	**Los Angeles Raiders**	**W** 24–21	6–3	Arrowhead Stadium	77,111	Recap
10	Bye						
11	November 10	at Los Angeles Rams	**W** 27–20	7–3	Anaheim Stadium	52,511	Recap
12	November 17	**Denver Broncos**	**L** 20–24	7–4	Arrowhead Stadium	74,661	Recap
13	November 24	at Cleveland Browns	**L** 15–20	7–5	Cleveland Stadium	63,991	Recap
14	December 1	at **Seattle Seahawks**	**W** 19–6	8–5	Kingdome	57,248	Recap
15	December 8	**San Diego Chargers**	**W** 20–17 (OT)	9–5	Arrowhead Stadium	73,330	Recap
16	December 14	at San Francisco 49ers	**L** 14–28	9–6	Candlestick Park	62,672	Recap
17	December 22	at **Los Angeles Raiders**	**W** 27–21	10–6	Los Angeles Memorial Coliseum	65,144	Recap
Note: Intra-division opponents are in **bold** text.

=== Game summaries ===
==== Week 1: vs. Atlanta Falcons ====
Week 1: Atlanta Falcons at Kansas City Chiefs – Game summary

Quarter	1	2	3	4	Total
Falcons	3	0	0	0	**3**
**Chiefs**	0	0	7	7	**14**

at Arrowhead Stadium, Kansas City, Missouri

- Date: September 1
- Game time: 12:00 p.m. CDT
- Game weather: Overcast, 76 °F (24 °C)
- Game attendance: 74,246
- Referee: Dick Hantak
- TV announcers (CBS): James Brown and Randy Cross
- Recap, Game Book

Game information

**First quarter**

- ATL – Brad Daluiso 20-yard field goal, 2:46. Falcons 3–0. **Drive: 16 plays, 74 yards, 10:43.**

**Second quarter**

- No scoring plays.

**Third quarter**

- KC – Christian Okoye 4-yard run (Nick Lowery kick), 8:48. Chiefs 7–3. **Drive: 4 plays, 27 yards, 2:02.**

**Fourth quarter**

- KC – Emile Harry 6-yard pass from Steve DeBerg (Nick Lowery kick), 8:57. Chiefs 14–3. **Drive: 8 plays, 91 yards, 5:14.**

**Top passers**

- ATL – Chris Miller – 9/21, 110 yards, 4 INT
- KC – Steve DeBerg – 13/24, 158 yards, TD

**Top rushers**

- ATL – Keith Jones – 18 rushes, 74 yards
- KC – Christian Okoye – 22 rushes, 143 yards, TD

**Top receivers**

- ATL – Mike Ruether – 1 reception, 22 yards
- KC – Stephone Paige – 6 receptions, 79 yards

==== Week 2: vs. New Orleans Saints ====
Week 2: New Orleans Saints at Kansas City Chiefs – Game summary

Quarter	1	2	3	4	Total
**Saints**	10	7	0	0	**17**
Chiefs	0	0	3	7	**10**

at Arrowhead Stadium, Kansas City, Missouri

- Date: September 8
- Game time: 12:00 p.m. CDT
- Game weather: 80 °F (27 °C)
- Game attendance: 74,816
- Referee: Red Cashion
- TV announcers (CBS): Jim Nantz and Hank Stram
- Recap, Game Book

Game information

**First quarter**

- NO – Morten Andersen 40-yard field goal, 7:44. Saints 3–0. **Drive: 12 plays, 55 yards, 7:16.**
- NO – Eric Martin 13-yard pass from Bobby Hebert (Morten Andersen kick), 1:20. Saints 10–0. **Drive: 8 plays, 55 yards, 5:11.**

**Second quarter**

- NO – Quinn Early 45-yard pass from Bobby Hebert (Morten Andersen kick), 5:05. Saints 17–0. **Drive: 6 plays, 65 yards, 4:16.**

**Third quarter**

- KC – Nick Lowery 23-yard field goal, 6:02. Saints 17–3. **Drive: 15 plays, 88 yards, 8:58.**

**Fourth quarter**

- KC – Jonathan Hayes 7-yard pass from Steve DeBerg (Nick Lowery kick), 13:52. Saints 17–10. **Drive: 13 plays, 59 yards, 5:16.**

**Top passers**

- NO – Bobby Hebert – 19/27, 211 yards, 2 TD
- KC – Steve DeBerg – 23/43, 212 yards, TD, 2 INT

**Top rushers**

- NO – Craig Heyward – 15 rushes, 51 yards
- KC – Barry Word – 10 rushes, 40 yards

**Top receivers**

- NO – Eric Martin – 7 receptions, 67 yards, TD
- KC – Todd McNair – 8 receptions, 62 yards

==== Week 3: at Houston Oilers ====
Week 3: Kansas City Chiefs at Houston Oilers – Game summary

Quarter	1	2	3	4	Total
Chiefs	0	7	0	0	**7**
**Oilers**	7	0	7	3	**17**

at Astrodome, Houston, Texas

- Date: September 16
- Game time: 8:00 p.m. CDT
- Game weather: None (indoor stadium)
- Game attendance: 61,058
- Referee: Gordon McCarter
- TV announcers (ABC): Al Michaels, Frank Gifford and Dan Dierdorf
- Recap, Game Book

Game information

**First quarter**

- HOU – Allen Pinkett 1-yard run (Ian Howfield kick), 3:59. Oilers 7–0. **Drive: 9 plays, 27 yards, 5:04.**

**Second quarter**

- KC – Christian Okoye 2-yard run (Nick Lowery kick), 0:27. Tied 7–7. **Drive: 13 plays, 70 yards, 6:04.**

**Third quarter**

- HOU – Haywood Jeffires 4-yard pass from Warren Moon (Ian Howfield kick), 0:09. Oilers 14–7. **Drive: 14 plays, 93 yards, 9:03.**

**Fourth quarter**

- HOU – Ian Howfield 23-yard field goal, 0:21. Oilers 17–7. **Drive: 17 plays, 80 yards, 9:19.**

**Top passers**

- KC – Steve DeBerg – 9/14, 93 yards, INT
- HOU – Warren Moon – 29/38, 233 yards, TD

**Top rushers**

- KC – Christian Okoye – 17 rushes, 75 yards, TD
- HOU – Allen Pinkett – 18 rushes, 47 yards, TD

**Top receivers**

- KC – Tim Barnett – 2 receptions, 31 yards
- HOU – Haywood Jeffires – 9 receptions, 60 yards, TD

==== Week 4: vs. Seattle Seahawks ====
Week 4: Seattle Seahawks at Kansas City Chiefs – Game summary

Quarter	1	2	3	4	Total
Seahawks	0	0	3	10	**13**
**Chiefs**	0	10	0	10	**20**

at Arrowhead Stadium, Kansas City, Missouri

- Date: September 22
- Game time: 3:00 p.m. CDT
- Game weather: Overcast, 62 °F (17 °C)
- Game attendance: 71,789
- Referee: Dale Hamer
- TV announcers (NBC): Jim Donovan and Beasley Reece
- Recap, Game Book

Game information

**First quarter**

- No scoring plays.

**Second quarter**

- KC – Nick Lowery 37-yard field goal, 14:33. Chiefs 3–0. **Drive: 15 plays, 71 yards, 7:08.**
- KC – Tim Barnett 18-yard pass from Steve DeBerg (Nick Lowery kick), 9:49. Chiefs 10–0. **Drive: 6 plays, 36 yards, 3:01.**

**Third quarter**

- SEA – John Kasay 45-yard field goal, 2:57. Chiefs 10–3. **Drive: 5 plays, 40 yards, 1:57.**

**Fourth quarter**

- KC – Nick Lowery 39-yard field goal, 14:53. Chiefs 13–3. **Drive: 9 plays, 66 yards, 3:04.**
- KC – Harvey Williams 15-yard pass from Steve DeBerg (Nick Lowery kick), 9:31. Chiefs 20–3. **Drive: 6 plays, 46 yards, 2:54.**
- SEA – John Kasay 38-yard field goal, 6:27. Chiefs 20–6. **Drive: 10 plays, 45 yards, 3:04.**
- SEA – Derrick Fenner 1-yard run (John Kasay kick), 1:39. Chiefs 20–13. **Drive: 8 plays, 67 yards, 2:22.**

**Top passers**

- SEA – Jeff Kemp – 18/30, 232 yards, 2 INT
- KC – Steve DeBerg – 21/32, 214 yards, 2 TD

**Top rushers**

- SEA – Derrick Fenner – 15 rushes, 76 yards, TD
- KC – Christian Okoye – 16 rushes, 79 yards

**Top receivers**

- SEA – Brian Blades – 8 receptions, 97 yards
- KC – Robb Thomas – 4 receptions, 57 yards

==== Week 5: at San Diego Chargers ====
Week 5: Kansas City Chiefs at San Diego Chargers – Game summary

Quarter	1	2	3	4	Total
**Chiefs**	7	7	0	0	**14**
Chargers	7	0	3	3	**13**

at Jack Murphy Stadium, San Diego, California

- Date: September 29
- Game time: 3:00 p.m. CDT/1:00 p.m. PDT
- Game weather: Fair and Warm, 77 °F (25 °C)
- Game attendance: 44,907
- Referee: Howard Roe
- TV announcers (NBC): Dick Enberg and Bill Walsh
- Recap, Game Book

Game information

**First quarter**

- KC – Christian Okoye 1-yard run (Nick Lowery kick), 13:41. Chiefs 7–0. **Drive: 3 plays, 7 yards, 1:19.**
- SD – Rod Bernstine 2-yard run (John Carney kick), 8:01. Tied 7–7. **Drive: 9 plays, 54 yards, 5:40.**

**Second quarter**

- KC – Robb Thomas 11-yard pass from Steve DeBerg (Nick Lowery kick), 9:05. Chiefs 14–7. **Drive: 10 plays, 71 yards, 5:47.**

**Third quarter**

- SD – John Carney 26-yard field goal, 8:45. Chiefs 14–10. **Drive: 10 plays, 61 yards, 6:15.**

**Fourth quarter**

- SD – John Carney 37-yard field goal, 9:30. Chiefs 14–13. **Drive: 5 plays, 26 yards, 3:18.**

**Top passers**

- KC – Steve DeBerg – 11/20, 112 yards, TD, INT
- SD – John Friesz – 10/25, 162 yards

**Top rushers**

- KC – Christian Okoye – 19 rushes, 65 yards, TD
- SD – Rod Bernstine – 26 rushes, 112 yards, TD

**Top receivers**

- KC – Stephone Paige – 2 receptions, 22 yards
- SD – Ronnie Harmon – 3 receptions, 48 yards

==== Week 6: vs. Buffalo Bills ====
Week 6: Buffalo Bills at Kansas City Chiefs – Game summary

Quarter	1	2	3	4	Total
Bills	0	6	0	0	**6**
**Chiefs**	3	10	17	3	**33**

at Arrowhead Stadium, Kansas City, Missouri

- Date: October 7
- Game time: 8:00 p.m. CDT
- Game weather: Clear, 70 °F (21 °C)
- Game attendance: 76,120
- Referee: Gerry Austin
- TV announcers (ABC): Al Michaels, Frank Gifford and Dan Dierdorf
- Recap, Game Book

Game information

**First quarter**

- KC – Nick Lowery 41-yard field goal, 12:30. Chiefs 3–0. **Drive: 6 plays, 23 yards, 2:30.**

**Second quarter**

- KC – Pete Holohan 1-yard pass from Steve DeBerg (Nick Lowery kick), 14:16. Chiefs 10–0. **Drive: 12 plays, 77 yards, 6:30.**
- BUF – Scott Norwood 44-yard field goal, 6:45. Chiefs 10–3. **Drive: 8 plays, 53 yards, 2:04.**
- BUF – Scott Norwood 25-yard field goal, 4:06. Chiefs 10–6. **Drive: 6 plays, 27 yards, 2:27.**
- KC – Nick Lowery 40-yard field goal, 0:00. Chiefs 13–6. **Drive: 10 plays, 57 yards, 4:06.**

**Third quarter**

- KC – Nick Lowery 24-yard field goal, 4:21. Chiefs 16–6. **Drive: 14 plays, 69 yards, 8:39.**
- KC – Christian Okoye 5-yard run (Nick Lowery kick), 0:27. Chiefs 23–6. **Drive: 2 plays, 17 yards, 0:51.**
- KC – Christian Okoye 2-yard run (Nick Lowery kick), 0:27. Chiefs 30–6. **Drive: 4 plays, 11 yards, 1:44.**

**Fourth quarter**

- KC – Nick Lowery 22-yard field goal, 4:02. Chiefs 33–6. **Drive: 15 plays, 59 yards, 9:45.**

**Top passers**

- BUF – Jim Kelly – 17/23, 189 yards
- KC – Steve DeBerg – 16/23, 150 yards, TD

**Top rushers**

- BUF – Thurman Thomas – 13 rushes, 51 yards
- KC – Christian Okoye – 29 rushes, 122 yards, 2 TD

**Top receivers**

- BUF – Andre Reed – 5 receptions, 84 yards
- KC – Robb Thomas – 4 receptions, 55 yards

==== Week 7: vs. Miami Dolphins ====
Week 7: Miami Dolphins at Kansas City Chiefs – Game summary

Quarter	1	2	3	4	Total
Dolphins	0	0	0	7	**7**
**Chiefs**	14	14	14	0	**42**

at Arrowhead Stadium, Kansas City, Missouri

- Date: October 13
- Game time: 3:00 p.m. CDT
- Game weather: Partly Sunny, 74 °F (23 °C)
- Game attendance: 76,021
- Referee: Pat Haggerty
- TV announcers (NBC): Don Criqui and Bob Trumpy
- Recap, Game Book

Game information

**First quarter**

- KC – Christian Okoye 38-yard run (Nick Lowery kick), 10:01. Chiefs 7–0. **Drive: 5 plays, 68 yards, 2:36.**
- KC – Chris Martin 100-yard fumble return (Nick Lowery kick), 5:04. Chiefs 14–0.

**Second quarter**

- KC – Tim Barnett 7-yard pass from Steve DeBerg (Nick Lowery kick), 13:42. Chiefs 21–0. **Drive: 9 plays, 75 yards, 4:37.**
- KC – Christian Okoye 1-yard run (Nick Lowery kick), 4:02. Chiefs 28–0. **Drive: 13 plays, 81 yards, 8:27.**

**Third quarter**

- KC – Todd McNair 14-yard pass from Steve DeBerg (Nick Lowery kick), 8:16. Chiefs 35–0. **Drive: 10 plays, 80 yards, 6:44.**
- KC – Tim Barnett 41-yard pass from Steve DeBerg (Nick Lowery kick), 3:03. Chiefs 42–0. **Drive: 4 plays, 60 yards, 2:59.**

**Fourth quarter**

- MIA – Scott Secules 4-yard run (Pete Stoyanovich kick), 12:23. Chiefs 42–7. **Drive: 11 plays, 77 yards, 5:40.**

**Top passers**

- MIA – Dan Marino – 15/29, 216 yards
- KC – Steve DeBerg – 9/12, 177 yards, 3 TD

**Top rushers**

- MIA – Mark Higgs – 5 rushes, 38 yards
- KC – Christian Okoye – 23 rushes, 153 yards, 2 TD

**Top receivers**

- MIA – Tony Martin – 4 receptions, 104 yards
- KC – Todd McNair – 3 receptions, 72 yards, TD

==== Week 8: at Denver Broncos ====
Week 8: Kansas City Chiefs at Denver Broncos – Game summary

Quarter	1	2	3	4	Total
Chiefs	3	3	3	7	**16**
**Broncos**	0	13	3	3	**19**

at Mile High Stadium, Denver, Colorado

- Date: October 20
- Game time: 3:00 p.m. CDT/2:00 p.m. MDT
- Game weather: Sunny, 64 °F (18 °C)
- Game attendance: 75,866
- Referee: Jerry Markbreit
- TV announcers (NBC): Joel Meyers and Dan Hampton
- Recap, Game Book

Game information

**First quarter**

- KC – Nick Lowery 32-yard field goal, 8:51. Chiefs 3–0. **Drive: 9 plays, 68 yards, 5:00.**

**Second quarter**

- DEN – David Treadwell 39-yard field goal, 14:24. Tied 3–3. **Drive: 15 plays, 58 yards, 9:27.**
- DEN – David Treadwell 30-yard field goal, 8:57. Broncos 6–3. **Drive: 9 plays, 57 yards, 3:14.**
- KC – Nick Lowery 48-yard field goal, 1:08. Tied 6–6. **Drive: 17 plays, 55 yards, 7:49.**
- DEN – Derek Russell 22-yard pass from John Elway (David Treadwell kick), 0:11. Broncos 13–6. **Drive: 6 plays, 80 yards, 0:57.**

**Third quarter**

- KC – Nick Lowery 25-yard field goal, 8:56. Broncos 13–9. **Drive: 14 plays, 67 yards, 6:04.**
- DEN – David Treadwell 25-yard field goal, 1:07. Broncos 16–9. **Drive: 6 plays, 30 yards, 2:24.**

**Fourth quarter**

- KC – Harvey Williams 14-yard run (Nick Lowery kick), 5:40. Tied 16–16. **Drive: 8 plays, 58 yards, 4:45.**
- DEN – David Treadwell 27-yard field goal, 2:37. Broncos 19–16. **Drive: 7 plays, 70 yards, 3:03.**

**Top passers**

- KC – Steve DeBerg – 21/35, 241 yards
- DEN – John Elway – 14/27, 270 yards, TD

**Top rushers**

- KC – Harvey Williams – 14 rushes, 84 yards, TD
- DEN – Greg Lewis – 17 rushes, 54 yards

**Top receivers**

- KC – Tim Barnett – 6 receptions, 78 yards
- DEN – Mark Jackson – 2 receptions, 80 yards

==== Week 9: vs. Los Angeles Raiders ====
Week 9: Los Angeles Raiders at Kansas City Chiefs – Game summary

Quarter	1	2	3	4	Total
Raiders	11	7	3	0	**21**
**Chiefs**	0	7	3	14	**24**

at Arrowhead Stadium, Kansas City, Missouri

- Date: October 28
- Game time: 8:00 p.m. CST
- Game weather: Mostly Cloudy, 68 °F (20 °C)
- Game attendance: 77,111
- Referee: Tom White
- TV announcers (ABC): Al Michaels, Frank Gifford and Dan Dierdorf
- Recap, Game Book

Game information

**First quarter**

- RAI – Jeff Jaeger 18-yard field goal, 10:34. Raiders 3–0. **Drive: 4 plays, 0 yards, 1:29.**
- RAI – Tim Barnett tackled in end zone by Torin Dorn for a Safety, 8:51. Raiders 5–0.
- RAI – Nick Bell 1-yard run (kick blocked), 7:21. Raiders 11–0. **Drive: 4 plays, 55 yards, 1:40.**

**Second quarter**

- KC – Bill Jones 8-yard pass from Steve DeBerg (Nick Lowery kick), 11:03. Raiders 11–7. **Drive: 8 plays, 45 yards, 4:09.**
- RAI – Steve Smith 37-yard pass from Jay Schroeder (Jeff Jaeger kick), 6:43. Raiders 18–7. **Drive: 8 plays, 77 yards, 4:20.**

**Third quarter**

- KC – Nick Lowery 33-yard field goal, 7:54. Raiders 18–10. **Drive: 11 plays, 61 yards, 5:20.**
- RAI – Jeff Jaeger 22-yard field goal, 2:09. Raiders 21–10. **Drive: 11 plays, 75 yards, 5:45.**

**Fourth quarter**

- KC – Christian Okoye 1-yard run (Nick Lowery kick), 8:07. Raiders 21–17. **Drive: 6 plays, 15 yards, 2:58.**
- KC – Tim Barnett 6-yard pass from Steve DeBerg (Nick Lowery kick), 0:47. Chiefs 24–21. **Drive: 10 plays, 57 yards, 3:45.**

**Top passers**

- RAI – Jay Schroeder – 12/26, 250 yards, TD, 3 INT
- KC – Steve DeBerg – 19/30, 161 yards, 2 TD, INT

**Top rushers**

- RAI – Roger Craig – 17 rushes, 59 yards
- KC – Christian Okoye – 17 rushes, 62 yards, TD

**Top receivers**

- RAI – Mervyn Fernandez – 3 receptions, 107 yards
- KC – Tim Barnett – 5 receptions, 45 yards, TD

==== Week 11: at Los Angeles Rams ====
Week 11: Kansas City Chiefs at Los Angeles Rams – Game summary

Quarter	1	2	3	4	Total
**Chiefs**	7	7	6	7	**27**
Rams	0	14	0	6	**20**

at Anaheim Stadium, Anaheim, California

- Date: November 10
- Game time: 3:00 p.m. CST/1:00 p.m. PST
- Game weather: Partly Cloudy, 73 °F (23 °C)
- Game attendance: 52,511
- Referee: Johnny Grier
- TV announcers (NBC): Charlie Jones and Todd Christensen
- Recap, Game Book

Game information

**First quarter**

- KC – Jonathan Hayes 6-yard pass from Steve DeBerg (Nick Lowery kick), 3:22. Chiefs 7–0. **Drive: 7 plays, 65 yards, 3:51.**

**Second quarter**

- LA – Damone Johnson 1-yard pass from Jim Everett (Tony Zendejas kick), 11:24. Tied 7–7. **Drive: 11 plays, 83 yards, 6:58.**
- KC – Barry Word 1-yard run (Nick Lowery kick), 5:07. Chiefs 14–7. **Drive: 11 plays, 80 yards, 6:17.**
- LA – Henry Ellard 14-yard pass from Jim Everett (Tony Zendejas kick), 0:34. Tied 14–14. **Drive: 10 plays, 93 yards, 4:33.**

**Third quarter**

- KC – Nick Lowery 20-yard field goal, 9:10. Chiefs 17–14. **Drive: 9 plays, 78 yards, 5:50.**
- KC – Nick Lowery 44-yard field goal, 2:47. Chiefs 20–14. **Drive: 6 plays, 35 yards, 2:30.**

**Fourth quarter**

- LA – Damone Johnson 17-yard pass from Jim Everett (kick failed, hit right upright), 7:06. Tied 20–20. **Drive: 8 plays, 88 yards, 3:59.**
- KC – Derrick Thomas 23-yard fumble return (Nick Lowery kick), 2:25. Chiefs 27–20.

**Top passers**

- KC – Steve DeBerg – 17/26, 199 yards, TD
- LA – Jim Everett – 26/37, 329 yards, 3 TD, INT

**Top rushers**

- KC – Christian Okoye – 15 rushes, 96 yards
- LA – Robert Delpino – 20 rushes, 81 yards

**Top receivers**

- KC – J. J. Birden – 2 receptions, 49 yards
- LA – Henry Ellard – 8 receptions, 160 yards, TD

==== Week 12: vs. Denver Broncos ====
Week 12: Denver Broncos at Kansas City Chiefs – Game summary

Quarter	1	2	3	4	Total
**Broncos**	3	7	14	0	**24**
Chiefs	0	10	3	7	**20**

at Arrowhead Stadium, Kansas City, Missouri

- Date: November 17
- Game time: 12:00 p.m. CST
- Game weather: Mostly Cloudy, 59 °F (15 °C)
- Game attendance: 74,661
- Referee: Bob McElwee
- TV announcers (NBC): Joel Meyers and Dan Hampton
- Recap, Game Book

Game information

**First quarter**

- DEN – David Treadwell 37-yard field goal, 7:11. Broncos 3–0. **Drive: 7 plays, 3 yards, 3:55.**

**Second quarter**

- KC – Christian Okoye 7-yard run (Nick Lowery kick), 6:07. Chiefs 7–3. **Drive: 6 plays, 80 yards, 3:15.**
- DEN – Gaston Green 60-yard run (David Treadwell kick), 3:47. Broncos 10–7. **Drive: 4 plays, 80 yards, 2:20.**
- KC – Nick Lowery 19-yard field goal, 0:05. Tied 10–10. **Drive: 10 plays, 70 yards, 6:41.**

**Third quarter**

- KC – Nick Lowery 27-yard field goal, 9:28. Chiefs 13–10. **Drive: 11 plays, 66 yards, 5:32.**
- DEN – Mark Jackson 29-yard pass from John Elway (David Treadwell kick), 4:59. Broncos 17–13. **Drive: 5 plays, 40 yards, 2:22.**
- DEN – Charles Dimry 26-yard interception return (David Treadwell kick), 4:00. Broncos 24–13.

**Fourth quarter**

- KC – Tim Barnett 8-yard pass from Mark Vlasic (Nick Lowery kick), 7:29. Broncos 24–20. **Drive: 8 plays, 48 yards, 3:34.**

**Top passers**

- DEN – John Elway – 9/20, 134 yards, TD
- KC – Steve DeBerg – 11/24, 207 yards, 4 INT

**Top rushers**

- DEN – Gaston Green – 24 rushes, 133 yards, TD
- KC – Christian Okoye – 17 rushes, 83 yards, TD

**Top receivers**

- DEN – Mark Jackson – 2 receptions, 40 yards, TD
- KC – Robb Thomas – 7 receptions, 89 yards

==== Week 13: at Cleveland Browns ====
Week 13: Kansas City Chiefs at Cleveland Browns – Game summary

Quarter	1	2	3	4	Total
Chiefs	0	0	3	12	**15**
**Browns**	0	10	10	0	**20**

at Cleveland Municipal Stadium, Cleveland, Ohio

- Date: November 24
- Game time: 1:00 p.m. EST/12:00 p.m. CST
- Game weather: 31 °F (−1 °C)
- Game attendance: 63,991
- Referee: Larry Nemmers
- TV announcers (NBC): Tom Hammond and Joe Namath
- Recap, Game Book

Game information

**First quarter**

- No scoring plays.

**Second quarter**

- CLE – Leroy Hoard 1-yard run (Matt Stover kick), 3:31. Browns 7–0. **Drive: 10 plays, 85 yards, 6:13.**
- CLE – Matt Stover 34-yard field goal, 0:09. Browns 10–0. **Drive: 8 plays, 45 yards, 2:09.**

**Third quarter**

- CLE – Leroy Hoard 71-yard pass from Bernie Kosar (Matt Stover kick), 11:52. Browns 17–0. **Drive: 5 plays, 81 yards, 3:08.**
- KC – Nick Lowery 34-yard field goal, 8:00. Browns 17–3. **Drive: 9 plays, 55 yards, 3:52.**
- CLE – Matt Stover 21-yard field goal, 2:05. Browns 20–3. **Drive: 4 plays, 8 yards, 2:21.**

**Fourth quarter**

- KC – Nick Lowery 22-yard field goal, 12:03. Browns 20–6. **Drive: 11 plays, 51 yards, 5:02.**
- KC – Bernie Kosar tackled in end zone by Albert Lewis for a Safety, 5:57. Browns 20–8.
- KC – Emile Harry 5-yard pass from Steve DeBerg (Nick Lowery kick), 2:52. Browns 20–15. **Drive: 8 plays, 48 yards, 3:05.**

**Top passers**

- KC – Steve DeBerg – 30/50, 319 yards, TD, 2 INT
- CLE – Bernie Kosar – 13/20, 170 yards, TD, 2 INT

**Top rushers**

- KC – Barry Word – 8 rushes, 41 yards
- CLE – Leroy Hoard – 6 rushes, 61 yards, TD

**Top receivers**

- KC – Emile Harry – 11 receptions, 159 yards, TD
- CLE – Leroy Hoard – 2 receptions, 78 yards, TD

==== Week 14: at Seattle Seahawks ====
Week 14: Kansas City Chiefs at Seattle Seahawks – Game summary

Quarter	1	2	3	4	Total
**Chiefs**	3	6	3	7	**19**
Seahawks	3	0	0	3	**6**

at Kingdome, Seattle, Washington

- Date: December 1
- Game time: 3:00 p.m. CST/1:00 p.m. PST
- Game weather: None (indoor stadium)
- Game attendance: 57,248
- Referee: Pat Haggerty
- TV announcers (NBC): Don Criqui and Bob Trumpy
- Recap, Game Book

Game information

**First quarter**

- SEA – John Kasay 19-yard field goal, 8:03. Seahawks 3–0. **Drive: 11 plays, 63 yards, 6:57.**
- KC – Nick Lowery 20-yard field goal, 3:53. Tied 3–3. **Drive: 6 plays, 22 yards, 2:37.**

**Second quarter**

- KC – Nick Lowery 28-yard field goal, 9:59. Chiefs 6–3. **Drive: 12 plays, 70 yards, 5:14.**
- KC – Nick Lowery 36-yard field goal, 3:33. Chiefs 9–3. **Drive: 12 plays, 50 yards, 5:55.**

**Third quarter**

- KC – Nick Lowery 39-yard field goal, 8:43. Chiefs 12–3. **Drive: 12 plays, 56 yards, 6:17.**

**Fourth quarter**

- KC – Pete Holohan 8-yard pass from Steve DeBerg (Nick Lowery kick), 7:43. Chiefs 19–3. **Drive: 17 plays, 75 yards, 9:13.**
- SEA – John Kasay 26-yard field goal, 5:13. Chiefs 19–6. **Drive: 6 plays, 46 yards, 2:30.**

**Top passers**

- KC – Steve DeBerg – 17/26, 154 yards, TD
- SEA – Dave Krieg – 16/25, 263 yards, INT

**Top rushers**

- KC – Barry Word – 26 rushes, 96 yards
- SEA – John Williams – 7 rushes, 20 yards

**Top receivers**

- KC – Emile Harry – 6 receptions, 51 yards
- SEA – Travis McNeal – 4 receptions, 66 yards

==== Week 15: vs. San Diego Chargers ====
Week 15: San Diego Chargers at Kansas City Chiefs – Game summary

Quarter	1	2	3	4	OT	Total
Chargers	0	14	0	3	0	**17**
**Chiefs**	0	0	10	7	3	**20**

at Arrowhead Stadium, Kansas City, Missouri

- Date: December 8
- Game time: 12:00 p.m. CST
- Game weather: Mostly Sunny, 63 °F (17 °C)
- Game attendance: 73,330
- Referee: Gordon McCarter
- TV announcers (NBC): Tom Hammond and Joe Namath
- Recap, Game Book

Game information

**First quarter**

- No scoring plays.

**Second quarter**

- SD – Nate Lewis 6-yard pass from John Friesz (John Carney kick), 14:23. Chargers 7–0. **Drive: 18 plays, 80 yards, 11:52.**
- SD – Donald Frank 71-yard interception return (John Carney kick), 9:34. Chargers 14–0.

**Third quarter**

- KC – Nick Lowery 29-yard field goal, 5:31. Chargers 14–3. **Drive: 12 plays, 71 yards, 6:10.**
- KC – Barry Word 1-yard run (Nick Lowery kick), 3:44. Chargers 14–10. **Drive: 1 play, 1 yard, 0:04.**

**Fourth quarter**

- KC – Harvey Williams 16-yard pass from Mark Vlasic (Nick Lowery kick), 3:00. Chiefs 17–14. **Drive: 4 plays, 70 yards, 1:39.**
- SD – John Carney 27-yard field goal, 0:11. Tied 17–17. **Drive: 13 plays, 57 yards, 2:49.**

**Overtime**

- KC – Nick Lowery 18-yard field goal, 3:34. Chiefs 20–17. **Drive: 3 plays, 29 yards, 1:11.**

**Top passers**

- SD – John Friesz – 19/37, 208 yards, TD, INT
- KC – Mark Vlasic – 12/18, 150 yards, TD

**Top rushers**

- SD – Marion Butts – 20 rushes, 77 yards
- KC – Barry Word – 14 rushes, 66 yards, TD

**Top receivers**

- SD – Nate Lewis – 6 receptions, 79 yards, TD
- KC – Emile Harry – 5 receptions, 73 yards

==== Week 16: at San Francisco 49ers ====
Week 16: Kansas City Chiefs at San Francisco 49ers – Game summary

Quarter	1	2	3	4	Total
Chiefs	0	0	7	7	**14**
**49ers**	7	7	7	7	**28**

at Candlestick Park, San Francisco, California

- Date: December 14
- Game time: 3:00 p.m. CST/1:00 p.m. PST
- Game weather: Sunny Skies, 49 °F (9 °C)
- Game attendance: 62,672
- Referee: Dick Hantak
- TV announcers (NBC): Dick Enberg and Bill Walsh
- Recap, Game Book

Game information

**First quarter**

- SF – Jerry Rice 1-yard pass from Steve Bono (Mike Cofer kick), 9:53. 49ers 7–0. **Drive: 6 plays, 60 yards, 3:25.**

**Second quarter**

- SF – John Taylor 9-yard pass from Steve Bono (Mike Cofer kick), 12:16. 49ers 14–0. **Drive: 4 plays, 41 yards, 1:54.**

**Third quarter**

- SF – Jerry Rice 20-yard pass from Steve Bono (Mike Cofer kick), 6:11. 49ers 21–0. **Drive: 6 plays, 44 yards, 2:56.**
- KC – Barry Word 1-yard run (Nick Lowery kick), 4:31. 49ers 21–7. **Drive: 4 plays, 69 yards, 1:40.**

**Fourth quarter**

- SF – Dexter Carter 53-yard run (Mike Cofer kick), 11:44. 49ers 28–7. **Drive: 6 plays, 80 yards, 3:00.**
- KC – Emile Harry 17-yard pass from Steve DeBerg (Nick Lowery kick), 7:25. 49ers 28–14. **Drive: 10 plays, 75 yards, 4:19.**

**Top passers**

- KC – Steve DeBerg – 13/32, 180 yards, TD, INT
- SF – Steve Bono – 24/33, 220 yards, 3 TD

**Top rushers**

- KC – Barry Word – 17 rushes, 115 yards, TD
- SF – Dexter Carter – 11 rushes, 81 yards, TD

**Top receivers**

- KC – Emile Harry – 4 receptions, 64 yards, TD
- SF – Jerry Rice – 7 receptions, 81 yards, 2 TD

==== Week 17: at Los Angeles Raiders ====
Week 17: Kansas City Chiefs at Los Angeles Raiders – Game summary

Quarter	1	2	3	4	Total
**Chiefs**	7	10	0	10	**27**
Raiders	7	0	0	14	**21**

at Los Angeles Memorial Coliseum, Los Angeles, California

- Date: December 22
- Game time: 3:00 p.m. CST/1:00 p.m. PST
- Game weather: Sunny, 68 °F (20 °C)
- Game attendance: 65,144
- Referee: Howard Roe
- TV announcers (NBC): Dick Enberg and Bill Walsh
- Recap, Game Book

Game information

**First quarter**

- KC – Barry Word 1-yard run (Nick Lowery kick), 5:24. Chiefs 7–0. **Drive: 12 plays, 57 yards, 7:53.**
- RAI – Tim Brown 26-yard pass from Todd Marinovich (Jeff Jaeger kick), 2:35. Tied 7–7. **Drive: 7 plays, 73 yards, 2:49.**

**Second quarter**

- KC – J. J. Birden 57-yard pass from Steve DeBerg (Nick Lowery kick), 14:53. Chiefs 14–7. **Drive: 5 plays, 80 yards, 2:42.**
- KC – Nick Lowery 33-yard field goal, 2:21. Chiefs 17–7. **Drive: 13 plays, 67 yards, 6:36.**

**Third quarter**

- No scoring plays.

**Fourth quarter**

- KC – Nick Lowery 25-yard field goal, 13:23. Chiefs 20–7. **Drive: 17 plays, 86 yards, 9:58.**
- RAI – Ethan Horton 7-yard pass from Todd Marinovich (Jeff Jaeger kick), 9:31. Chiefs 20–14. **Drive: 10 plays, 57 yards, 3:52.**
- KC – J. J. Birden 53-yard pass from Steve DeBerg (Nick Lowery kick), 7:00. Chiefs 27–14. **Drive: 6 plays, 80 yards, 2:31.**
- RAI – Tim Brown 23-yard pass from Todd Marinovich (Jeff Jaeger kick), 3:56. Chiefs 27–21. **Drive: 11 plays, 80 yards, 3:04.**

**Top passers**

- KC – Steve DeBerg – 14/20, 277 yards, 2 TD
- RAI – Todd Marinovich – 23/40, 243 yards, 3 TD

**Top rushers**

- KC – Barry Word – 35 rushes, 152 yards, TD
- RAI – Marcus Allen – 9 rushes, 55 yards

**Top receivers**

- KC – J. J. Birden – 8 receptions, 188 yards, 2 TD
- RAI – Ethan Horton – 10 receptions, 89 yards, TD

=== Standings ===
AFC West
	W	L	T	PCT	DIV	CONF	PF	PA	STK
^{(2)} Denver Broncos	12	4	0	.750	5–3	10–4	304	235	W4
^{(4)} Kansas City Chiefs	10	6	0	.625	6–2	8–4	322	252	W1
^{(5)} Los Angeles Raiders	9	7	0	.563	5–3	7–5	298	297	L3
Seattle Seahawks	7	9	0	.438	2–6	6–6	276	261	W1
San Diego Chargers	4	12	0	.250	2–6	3–9	274	342	L1

== Postseason ==
=== Schedule ===
Round	Date	Opponent (seed)	Result	Record	Venue	Attendance	Recap
Wild Card	December 28	Los Angeles Raiders (5)	W 10–6	1–0	Arrowhead Stadium	75,827	Recap
Divisional	January 5, 1992	at Buffalo Bills (1)	L 14–37	1–1	Rich Stadium	80,182	Recap

=== Game summaries ===
==== AFC Wild Card Playoffs: vs. (5) Los Angeles Raiders ====
AFC Wild Card Playoffs: (5) Los Angeles Raiders at (4) Kansas City Chiefs – Game summary

Quarter	1	2	3	4	Total
Raiders	0	3	3	0	6
Chiefs	0	7	0	3	10

at Arrowhead Stadium, Kansas City, Missouri

- Date: December 28
- Game time: 11:30 a.m. CST
- Game weather: Overcast with Fog, 38 °F (3 °C)
- Game attendance: 75,827
- Referee: Jerry Markbreit
- TV announcers (ABC): Brent Musburger, Dick Vermeil and Lynn Swann
- Recap, Game Book

Game information

First quarter

- No scoring plays.

Second quarter

- KC – Fred Jones 11-yard pass from Steve DeBerg (Nick Lowery kick), 5:07. Chiefs 7–0. Drive: 1 play, 11 yards, 0:06.
- RAI – Jeff Jaeger 32-yard field goal, 0:26. Chiefs 7–3. Drive: 10 plays, 65 yards, 4:46.

Third quarter

- RAI – Jeff Jaeger 26-yard field goal, 8:19. Chiefs 7–6. Drive: 11 plays, 62 yards, 6:41.

Fourth quarter

- KC – Nick Lowery 18-yard field goal, 10:26. Chiefs 10–6. Drive: 13 plays, 61 yards, 7:32.

Top passers

- RAI – Todd Marinovich – 12/23, 140 yards, 4 INT
- KC – Steve DeBerg – 9/14, 89 yards, TD, INT

Top rushers

- RAI – Nick Bell – 20 rushes, 107 yards
- KC – Barry Word – 33 rushes, 130 yards

Top receivers

- RAI – Ethan Horton – 3 receptions, 59 yards
- KC – Bill Jones – 2 receptions, 25 yards

==== AFC Divisional Playoffs: at (1) Buffalo Bills ====
AFC Divisional Playoffs: (4) Kansas City Chiefs at (1) Buffalo Bills – Game summary

Quarter	1	2	3	4	Total
Chiefs	0	0	7	7	14
Bills	7	10	7	13	37

at Rich Stadium, Orchard Park, New York

- Date: January 5
- Game time: 12:30 p.m. EST/11:30 a.m. CST
- Game weather: Partly Sunny, 40 °F (4 °C)
- Game attendance: 80,182
- Referee: Pat Haggerty
- TV announcers (NBC): Dick Enberg and Bill Walsh
- Recap, Game Book

Game information

First quarter

- BUF – Andre Reed 25-yard pass from Jim Kelly (Scott Norwood kick), 0:52. Bills 7–0. Drive: 8 plays, 80 yards, 3:25.

Second quarter

- BUF – Andre Reed 53-yard pass from Jim Kelly (Scott Norwood kick), 10:35. Bills 14–0. Drive: 4 plays, 69 yards, 1:28.
- BUF – Scott Norwood 33-yard field goal, 0:02. Bills 17–0. Drive: 9 plays, 39 yards, 1:37.

Third quarter

- BUF – James Lofton 10-yard pass from Jim Kelly (Scott Norwood kick), 11:53. Bills 24–0. Drive: 6 plays, 36 yards, 2:13.
- KC – Barry Word 3-yard run (Nick Lowery kick), 3:08. Bills 24–7. Drive: 4 plays, 43 yards, 2:26.

Fourth quarter

- BUF – Scott Norwood 20-yard field goal, 10:54. Bills 27–7. Drive: 14 plays, 68 yards, 7:14.
- BUF – Scott Norwood 47-yard field goal, 9:08. Bills 30–7. Drive: 4 plays, 2 yards, 1:31.
- BUF – Kenneth Davis 5-yard run (Scott Norwood kick), 4:57. Bills 37–7. Drive: 6 plays, 33 yards, 3:59.
- KC – Fred Jones 20-yard pass from Mark Vlasic (Nick Lowery kick), 2:07. Bills 37–14. Drive: 8 plays, 75 yards, 2:50.

Top passers

- KC – Mark Vlasic – 9/20, 124 yards, TD, 4 INT
- BUF – Jim Kelly – 23/35, 373 yards, 3 TD, 3 INT

Top rushers

- KC – Barry Word – 15 rushes, 50 yards, TD
- BUF – Thurman Thomas – 22 rushes, 100 yards

Top receivers

- KC – Todd McNair – 5 receptions, 52 yards
- BUF – Andre Reed – 4 receptions, 100 yards, 2 TD
