= Harvey Williams (American football) =

American football player (born 1967)

No. 44, 22
- Position: Running back

Personal information
- Born: April 22, 1967 (age 59); Hempstead, Texas, U.S.
- Listed height: 6 ft 2 in (1.88 m)
- Listed weight: 220 lb (100 kg)

Career information
- High school: Hempstead
- College: LSU
- NFL draft: 1991: 1st round, 21st overall pick

Career history
- Kansas City Chiefs (1991–1993); Los Angeles/Oakland Raiders (1994–1998)

Awards and highlights
- First-team All-SEC (1990)

Career NFL statistics
- Rushing yards: 3,952
- Rushing average: 3.9
- Rushing touchdowns: 20
- Stats at Pro Football Reference

Harvey Lavance Williams (born April 22, 1967), is an American former professional football player who was a running back in the National Football League (NFL) for the Kansas City Chiefs and the Los Angeles/Oakland Raiders. He played college football for the LSU Tigers.

== College career ==
Williams ran for over 2,800 yards in his four years at Louisiana State University, and is fifth in Tigers' history in career all-purpose yards. In his final season at LSU, he was named to the All-SEC team. The Kansas City Chiefs selected Williams in the first round of the 1991 NFL draft.

== Professional career ==
In his first two seasons with Kansas City, Barry Word and Christian Okoye consistently beat Williams out for playing time. In both seasons, he finished behind Word and Okoye in rushing yards. By 1993, Marcus Allen joined the team and became the starter.

In 1994, Williams moved on to the Los Angeles Raiders. He finally received a chance to be a starter, and responded with two good seasons. He rushed for 983 yards in 1994. He followed up this season with his only 1,000-yard rushing season, rushing for 1,114 yards and 9 touchdowns in 1995.

== NFL career statistics ==
Year	Team	GP	Att	Yds	Avg	Lng	TD	Rec	Yds	Avg	Lng	TD
1991	KC	14	97	447	4.6	21	1	16	147	9.2	17	2
1992	KC	14	78	262	3.4	11	1	5	24	4.8	12	0
1993	KC	7	42	149	3.5	19	0	7	42	6.0	14	0
1994	LA	16	282	983	3.5	28	4	47	391	8.3	27	3
1995	OAK	16	255	1,114	4.4	60	9	54	375	6.9	28	0
1996	OAK	13	121	431	3.6	44	0	22	143	6.5	20	0
1997	OAK	14	18	70	3.9	13	3	16	147	9.2	32	2
1998	OAK	16	128	496	3.9	25	2	26	173	6.7	15	0
Career		110	1,021	3,952	3.9	60	20	193	1,442	7.5	32	7
