= J. J. Birden =

American football player (born 1965)

JJ Birden
No. 88, 89
- Position: Wide receiver

Personal information
- Born: June 16, 1965 (age 61); Portland, Oregon, U.S.
- Listed height: 5 ft 10 in (1.78 m)
- Listed weight: 157 lb (71 kg)

Career information
- High school: Lakeridge (Lake Oswego, Oregon)
- College: Oregon
- NFL draft: 1988: 8th round, 216th overall pick

Career history
- Cleveland Browns (1988); Dallas Cowboys (1989)*; Kansas City Chiefs (1990–1994); Atlanta Falcons (1995–1996)
- * Offseason or practice squad member only

Career NFL statistics
- Receptions: 244
- Receiving yards: 3,441
- Receiving touchdowns: 17
- Stats at Pro Football Reference

LaJourdain J. Birden Sr. (born June 16, 1965) is an American former professional football player who was selected by the Cleveland Browns in the eighth round of the 1988 NFL draft.

A now retired wide receiver, Birden graduated from Lakeridge High School in Lake Oswego, Oregon, and the University of Oregon. He played in 9 NFL seasons for the Kansas City Chiefs and Atlanta Falcons from 1988 to 1996.

== College career ==
Weighing just 140 pounds by the end of his senior high school season, Birden was considered too small to be an NCAA receiver and was not offered any football scholarships. His speed did earn him several track-and-field scholarship offers though, and he selected Oregon because it was the only one in which he would be allowed to play football as well. Joining the team as a walk-on in 1984, Birden caught just six passes in his first two seasons. He made the starting lineup as a junior, but injuries over his final two years resulted in him just catching 39 total passes during that timespan. He finished his four seasons at Oregon with 45 receptions for 739 yards and a touchdown. He later admitted "I had a very unimpressive college career".

== Professional career ==
Despite his undistinguished college career, Birden still received an invite to the 1988 NFL Combine, where his speed was impressive enough to get Cleveland Browns coach Marty Schottenheimer to select him in the 8th round of the 1988 NFL draft with the 261st overall pick. However, a knee injury kept him on injured reserve in the 1988 season and cost him a chance to qualify as a sprinter for the 1988 US Olympics team. After the season, Schottenheimer left the team to coach in Kansas City and Birden was cut. Birden received several offers from other teams, but his lingering knee injury limited him to spending the 1989 season on the Dallas Cowboys practice squad. After that season, Birden was released again.

In 1990, Birden rejoined his former coach Marty Schottenheimer on the Kansas City Chiefs. Birden was cut during training camp, but re-signed a few weeks later and went on to play for Kansas City for the next five seasons. His first two years were as a backup, which featured an 8-catch, 188-yard, 2-touchdown performance in the final game of the 1991 season. In 1992, Birden made the starting lineup and started in 40 of his 45 games with the Chiefs over the next three seasons. He also started in all 22 games he played for the Falcons before retiring.

Birden finished his career with 244 receptions for 3,441 yards and 17 touchdowns. He also played in nine playoff games, catching 33 passes for 429 yards and three touchdowns in that span.

== NFL career statistics ==
Legend
**Bold**	Career high

=== Regular season ===
Year	Team	Games		Receiving				
Year	Team	GP	GS	Rec	Yds	Avg	Lng	TD
1990	KAN	11	0	15	352	**23.5**	**90**	3
1991	KAN	15	0	27	465	17.2	57	2
1992	KAN	**16**	11	42	644	15.3	72	3
1993	KAN	**16**	**16**	**51**	**721**	14.1	50	2
1994	KAN	13	13	48	637	13.3	44	**4**
1995	ATL	10	10	31	303	9.8	24	1
1996	ATL	12	12	30	319	10.6	57	2
Career		93	62	244	3,441	14.1	90	17

=== Playoffs ===
Year	Team	Games		Receiving				
Year	Team	GP	GS	Rec	Yds	Avg	Lng	TD
1990	KAN	1	0	0	0	0.0	0	0
1991	KAN	2	0	3	37	12.3	18	0
1992	KAN	1	1	4	78	**19.5**	24	0
1993	KAN	**3**	**3**	**16**	**192**	12.0	26	**2**
1994	KAN	1	1	4	56	14.0	21	0
1995	ATL	1	1	6	64	10.7	**27**	1
Career		9	6	33	427	12.9	27	3

== After football ==
Following his football career, Birden became an executive for Xocai with Team X 88. Later he became a distributor of Isagenix health and wellness products and continues to represent Isagenix. Birden has also travelled extensively as a motivational and opportunity speaker and trainer for companies large and small; team building seminars, as well as youth group life skill development meetings.

Birden and his wife Raina have three children and five adopted children. They live in Scottsdale, Arizona.

In 2010, Birden was inducted into the University of Oregon's Athletic Hall of Fame for his performance on the Ducks' 1985 Track and Field NCAA Championship team.
