= Willie Davis (wide receiver) =

American football player (born 1967)

Kansas City Chiefs
- Title: Senior personnel executive

Personal information
- Born: October 10, 1967 (age 59); Little Rock, Arkansas, U.S.
- Listed height: 6 ft 0 in (1.83 m)
- Listed weight: 188 lb (85 kg)

Career information
- Position: Wide receiver (No. 84, 86)
- High school: Altheimer-Sherrill (Altheimer, Arkansas)
- College: Central Arkansas
- NFL draft: 1990: undrafted

Career history

Playing
- Kansas City Chiefs (1990–1995); → Orlando Thunder (1992); Houston/Tennessee Oilers (1996–1998)

Operations
- Kansas City Chiefs (2006–2020) Area scout; Kansas City Chiefs (2021–present) Senior personnel executive

Awards and highlights
- 3× Super Bowl champion (LIV, LVII, LVIII)

Career NFL statistics
- Receptions: 286
- Receiving yards: 4,503
- Receiving touchdowns: 33
- Stats at Pro Football Reference

Willie Clark Davis (born October 10, 1967) is an American former professional football player who was a wide receiver for eight seasons in the National Football League (NFL) for the Kansas City Chiefs and Houston/Tennessee Oilers. He played college football for the Central Arkansas Bears.

Since rejoining the Chiefs organization as a scout in 2006, Davis was promoted to the position of 'Senior Personnel Executive' in the 2021 NFL offseason. He has won three Super Bowl championships with the Chiefs.

== NFL career statistics ==
Legend
	Led the league
**Bold**	Career high

=== Regular season ===
Year	Team	Games		Receiving				
Year	Team	GP	GS	Rec	Yds	Avg	Lng	TD
1991	KAN	1	0	0	0	0.0	0	0
1992	KAN	16	14	36	756	**21.0**	**74**	3
1993	KAN	16	15	**52**	**909**	17.5	66	**7**
1994	KAN	14	13	51	822	16.1	62	5
1995	KAN	16	16	33	527	16.0	60	5
1996	HOU	16	14	39	464	11.9	49	6
1997	TEN	16	15	43	564	13.1	46	4
1998	TEN	13	10	32	461	14.4	38	3
		108	97	286	4,503	15.7	74	33

=== Playoffs ===
Year	Team	Games		Receiving				
Year	Team	GP	GS	Rec	Yds	Avg	Lng	TD
1992	KAN	1	1	3	30	10.0	13	0
1993	KAN	3	3	**12**	**200**	**16.7**	**36**	**1**
1994	KAN	1	1	1	9	9.0	9	0
1995	KAN	1	1	0	0	0.0	0	0
		6	6	16	239	14.9	36	1

== Personal life ==
Davis is the older brother of former Tampa Bay Buccaneers wide receiver, Tyree Davis.
