= William Kirksey =

American gridiron football player (born 1966)

No. 52
- Position: Linebacker

Personal information
- Born: January 29, 1966 (age 60); Birmingham, Alabama, U.S.
- Listed height: 6 ft 2 in (1.88 m)
- Listed weight: 221 lb (100 kg)

Career information
- High school: Leeds (AL)
- College: Southern Miss
- NFL draft: 1990: undrafted

Career history
- Minnesota Vikings (1990); Atlanta Falcons (1990)*; London Monarchs (1992); Kansas City Chiefs (1992); Birmingham Barracudas (1995); Montreal Alouettes (1996)
- * Offseason or practice squad member only
- Stats at Pro Football Reference

William W. Kirksey Jr. (born January 29, 1966) is an American former professional football player who was a linebacker in the National Football League (NFL). Undrafted out of college, he played nine games for the Minnesota Vikings in 1990. He moved on to the WLAF's London Monarchs, and later returned to the NFL for a stint with the Kansas City Chiefs.

Kirksey played college football for the Southern Miss Golden Eagles, where he was a defensive team captain in 1989, led the team in tackles (146), and earned Second Team All-South Independent honors.

After his playing career, he became a defensive line coach at Northwest College, and later a linebackers coach at Coahoma Community College.
