= Barry Word =

American football player (born 1964)

No. 34, 23, 32
- Position: Running back

Personal information
- Born: January 17, 1964 (age 62); Long Island, Virginia, U.S.
- Listed height: 6 ft 2 in (1.88 m)
- Listed weight: 242 lb (110 kg)

Career information
- High school: Halifax County (South Boston, Virginia)
- College: Virginia
- NFL draft: 1986: 3rd round, 62nd overall pick

Career history
- New Orleans Saints (1987–1988); Dallas Cowboys (1988)*; Pittsburgh Steelers (1989)*; Kansas City Chiefs (1990–1992); Minnesota Vikings (1993); Arizona Cardinals (1994)
- * Offseason or practice squad member only

Awards and highlights
- PFW NFL Comeback Player of the Year (1990); ACC Player of the Year (1985); First-team All-ACC (1985)

Career NFL statistics
- Rushing yards: 2,897
- Rushing average: 4.1
- Receptions: 30
- Receiving yards: 280
- Total touchdowns: 16
- Stats at Pro Football Reference

Barry Quentin Word (born January 17, 1964), nicknamed "the Last Word", is an American former professional football player who was a running back in the National Football League (NFL).

== Early life ==
Barry Quentin Word was born on January 17, 1964, in Long Island, Virginia. He attended Halifax County High School in South Boston, Virginia.

== College career ==
Word played college football at the University of Virginia. In 1985, he ran for 1224 yards, which is currently the fifth most rushing yards total put up by a Virginia Cavaliers running back. Also in 1985, Word was the Atlantic Coast Conference player of the year.

== Professional career ==
Barry Word was selected in the third round, 62nd overall, by the New Orleans Saints in the 1986 NFL draft. Shortly after being drafted, he and two other Virginia athletes were indicted on cocaine distribution charges. The Saints did not offer a contract to Word after his indictment but retained his football rights. Word pleaded guilty, but his willingness to cooperate and his limited involvement in the case meant he only received 5 months in prison. After Word's release from prison in March 1987, he signed a three-year contract with the Saints and ran for 133 yards as a halfback in his rookie year. In 1988, however, he fell to third-string running back for the Saints behind Rueben Mayes and Dalton Hilliard, two running backs drafted by the Saints the prior year. Unhappy with being shifted from running back to halfback, Word walked away from the Saints after two games in 1988. He then had unsuccessful attempts to join the Dallas Cowboys later in 1988 and with the Pittsburgh Steelers in 1989. He was finally signed by the Kansas City Chiefs before the start of the 1990 season.

Word had a career year in 1990, rushing for 1015 yards on 204 carries, garnering NFL Comeback Player of the Year Award for his performance. He split carries with Christian Okoye during the 1990 season as well as the next two years. At the start of the 1994 season Word was traded to the Minnesota Vikings and he ran for 847 yards on 142 carries. He was signed by the Cardinals at the start of the 1994 season, but only played one game for them and did not have a rushing attempt. This was to be the last time he took the field in the NFL as he retired after the game. He has said that being able to retire early is not a bad thing, and said as much to Tiki Barber when Barber was set to retire concluding the 2006 season.

== Career statistics ==
=== NFL ===
Legend
**Bold**	Career high

==== Regular season ====
Year	Team	Games		Rushing					Receiving				
Year	Team	GP	GS	Att	Yds	Avg	Lng	TD	Rec	Yds	Avg	Lng	TD
1987	NOR	12	1	36	133	3.7	20	2	6	54	9.0	17	0
1988	NOR	2	0	0	0	0.0	0	0	0	0	0.0	0	0
1990	KAN	**16**	3	**204**	**1,015**	**5.0**	**53**	**4**	4	28	7.0	10	0
1991	KAN	**16**	3	160	684	4.3	37	**4**	2	13	6.5	8	0
1992	KAN	12	**11**	163	607	3.7	44	**4**	**9**	80	8.9	22	0
1993	MIN	13	8	142	458	3.2	14	2	**9**	**105**	**11.7**	**27**	0
1994	ARI	1	0	0	0	0.0	0	0	0	0	0.0	0	0
		72	26	705	2,897	4.1	53	16	30	280	9.3	27	0

==== Playoffs ====
Year	Team	Games		Rushing					Receiving				
Year	Team	GP	GS	Att	Yds	Avg	Lng	TD	Rec	Yds	Avg	Lng	TD
1987	NOR	1	0	0	0	0.0	0	0	0	0	0.0	0	0
1990	KAN	1	1	9	13	1.4	5	0	0	0	0.0	0	0
1991	KAN	**2**	**2**	**48**	**180**	**3.8**	**23**	**1**	**1**	**8**	**8.0**	**8**	0
1992	KAN	1	0	2	4	2.0	3	0	0	0	0.0	0	0
		5	3	59	197	3.3	23	1	1	8	8.0	8	0

=== College ===
Legend
**Bold**	Career high

Regular season

Year	Team	Games	Rushing				Receiving			
Year	Team	GP	Att	Yds	Avg	TD	Rec	Yds	Avg	TD
1982	Virginia	7	43	226	5.3	2	0	0	0.0	0
1983	Virginia	8	50	204	4.1	3	8	**157**	**19.6**	**1**
1984	Virginia	10	105	603	5.7	**6**	10	75	7.5	0
1985	Virginia	11	**207**	**1,224**	**5.9**	**6**	**11**	76	6.9	0
		36	405	2,257	5.6	17	29	308	10.6	1

== Personal life ==
He now lives in Haymarket, Virginia and owns SpeedPro Imaging of Centreville, a wide-formating printing company.
