= Robb Thomas =

American football player (born 1966)

No. 81, 23, 84, 86
- Position: Wide receiver

Personal information
- Born: March 29, 1966 (age 60); Corvallis, Oregon, U.S.
- Listed height: 5 ft 11 in (1.80 m)
- Listed weight: 178 lb (81 kg)

Career information
- High school: Corvallis
- College: Oregon State (1985–1989)
- NFL draft: 1989: 6th round, 143rd overall pick

Career history
- Kansas City Chiefs (1989–1991); Seattle Seahawks (1992–1995); Tampa Bay Buccaneers (1996–1998)

Awards and highlights
- First-team All-Pac-10 (1988); Second-team All-Pac-10 (1987)

Career NFL statistics
- Receptions: 174
- Receiving yards: 2,229
- Receiving touchdowns: 11
- Stats at Pro Football Reference

Robb Douglas Thomas (born March 29, 1966) is an American former professional football player who was a wide receiver in the National Football League (NFL) from 1989 to 1998. He played college football for the Oregon State Beavers.

== Early life ==
Thomas graduated from Corvallis High School in Corvallis, Oregon, in 1985 where he starred in football and track. In his junior season at Corvallis High in 1983, Thomas helped lead the Corvallis Spartans to a 3A Oregon State Championship.

== College career ==
At Oregon State University, Thomas set many records. He currently is second in "all purpose running yards" at OSU. His total of 3,379 yards for rushing, receiving and punt and kick-off returns during his career (1985–1988) is behind only that of Ken Carpenter's 3,903 yards from 1947 to 1949. His 230 yards vs. Akron in 1987 was a school record until broken by Mike Hass in 2004.

== Professional career ==
Pre-draft measurables
Height	Weight	40-yard dash	10-yard split	20-yard split	20-yard shuttle	Vertical jump
5 ft 10 3/4 in (1.80 m)	171 lb (78 kg)	4.51 s	1.53 s	2.64 s	4.06 s	34.5 in (0.88 m)

=== Kansas City Chiefs ===
Thomas was selected in the sixth round of the 1989 NFL draft (143rd overall) by the Kansas City Chiefs. Thomas spent half of his rookie season on the IR, had 8 receptions for 58 yards and 2 touchdowns while adjusting to Marty Schottenheimer's offense. The following season, Thomas started 12 games for the Chiefs, snagging 41 receptions for 545 yards and 4 touchdowns. In his third and final season in Kansas City, Thomas led the team with 43 receptions and 495 yards while starting 12 games alongside rookie Tim Barnett.

=== Seattle Seahawks ===
Thomas signed a free agent deal with the Seattle Seahawks in 1992. Thomas provided depth for the Seahawks at the wide receiver position but only started 1 game in his first three seasons in Seattle. In his fourth and final season in Seattle, he would start 2 games and make 12 receptions for 239 yards and a career-high 19.9 yards a reception.

=== Tampa Bay Buccaneers ===
In 1996, after four seasons playing in Seattle, Thomas signed with the Tampa Bay Buccaneers, playing for rookie head coach Tony Dungy. With the Buccaneers, Thomas had his first chance for significant playing time since playing for the Chiefs. He would start 8 games in 1996 and make 33 receptions for 427 yards and 2 touchdowns. His playing time would diminish over his final two seasons, as younger receivers came into the organization. Thomas' final reception in his 10-year NFL career came on a 50-yard touchdown catch on December 27, 1998, on the road against the Cincinnati Bengals. This would be his final NFL game.

== NFL career statistics ==
Legend
	Led the league
**Bold**	Career high

=== Regular season ===
Year	Team	Games		Receiving				
Year	Team	GP	GS	Rec	Yds	Avg	Lng	TD
1989	KAN	8	1	8	58	7.3	12	2
1990	KAN	**16**	**12**	41	**545**	13.3	47	**4**
1991	KAN	15	**12**	**43**	495	11.5	39	1
1992	SEA	15	0	11	136	12.4	31	0
1993	SEA	**16**	0	7	67	9.6	16	0
1994	SEA	**16**	1	4	70	17.5	35	0
1995	SEA	15	2	12	239	19.9	**50**	1
1996	TAM	12	8	33	427	12.9	31	2
1997	TAM	**16**	1	13	129	9.9	21	0
1998	TAM	7	0	2	63	**31.5**	**50**	1
		136	37	174	2,229	12.8	50	11

=== Playoffs ===
Year	Team	Games		Receiving				
Year	Team	GP	GS	Rec	Yds	Avg	Lng	TD
1990	KAN	1	1	1	15	15.0	15	0
1991	KAN	**2**	**2**	**4**	19	4.8	9	0
1997	TAM	**2**	0	3	**82**	**27.3**	**50**	0
		5	3	8	116	14.5	50	0

== Personal life ==
Thomas now resides in Oregon with his wife Melinda and their three children. His father Aaron Thomas also played in the NFL as a tight end.
