= Pete Holohan =

American football player (born 1959)

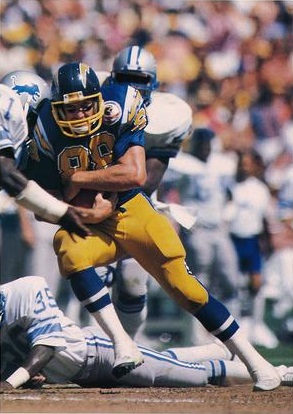
- Holohan in 1984

No. 88, 81, 89
- Position: Tight end

Personal information
- Born: July 25, 1959 (age 67); Albany, New York, U.S.
- Listed height: 6 ft 4 in (1.93 m)
- Listed weight: 232 lb (105 kg)

Career information
- High school: Liverpool (Liverpool, New York)
- College: Notre Dame
- NFL draft: 1981: 7th round, 189th overall pick

Career history
- San Diego Chargers (1981–1987); Los Angeles Rams (1988–1990); Kansas City Chiefs (1991); Cleveland Browns (1992)

Awards and highlights
- National champion (1977)

Career NFL statistics
- Receptions: 363
- Receiving yards: 3,981
- Touchdowns: 16
- Stats at Pro Football Reference

Peter Joseph Holohan (born July 25, 1959) is an American former professional football player who was a tight end in the National Football League (NFL). He played college football for the Notre Dame Fighting Irish before being selected by the San Diego Chargers in the seventh round of the 1981 NFL draft.

== Career ==
=== College career ===
Holohan was recruited to Notre Dame out of Liverpool High School (New York) as a quarterback. He also played basketball and was recruited by Syracuse coach Jim Boeheim.

When he arrived on campus at the University of Notre Dame, Holohan was set to compete against a group of 11 other quarterbacks that included Joe Montana. He eventually changed positions and was a member of Notre Dame's 1977 national title-winning team.

=== Professional career ===
A 6'4", 232-lb. tight end, Holohan was selected 189th overall by the San Diego Chargers in the seventh round of the 1981 NFL draft. He played for twelve NFL seasons from 1981 to 1992 for the Chargers, the Los Angeles Rams, the Kansas City Chiefs and the Cleveland Browns.

== NFL career statistics ==
Legend
**Bold**	Career high

=== Regular season ===
Year	Team	Games		Receiving				
Year	Team	GP	GS	Rec	Yds	Avg	Lng	TD
1981	SDG	7	0	1	14	**14.0**	14	0
1982	SDG	9	0	0	0	0.0	0	0
1983	SDG	**16**	3	23	272	11.8	35	2
1984	SDG	15	4	56	**734**	13.1	**51**	1
1985	SDG	15	3	42	458	10.9	23	**3**
1986	SDG	**16**	6	29	356	12.3	34	1
1987	SDG	12	4	20	239	12.0	18	0
1988	RAM	**16**	6	**59**	640	10.8	29	**3**
1989	RAM	**16**	6	51	510	10.0	31	2
1990	RAM	**16**	**8**	49	475	9.7	28	2
1991	KAN	**16**	3	13	113	8.7	26	2
1992	CLE	9	1	20	170	8.5	24	0
		163	44	363	3,981	11.0	51	16

=== Playoffs ===
Year	Team	Games		Receiving				
Year	Team	GP	GS	Rec	Yds	Avg	Lng	TD
1982	SDG	2	0	1	8	8.0	8	0
1988	RAM	1	0	3	44	**14.7**	**24**	**1**
1989	RAM	**3**	**2**	**12**	**111**	9.3	18	0
1991	KAN	2	0	0	0	0.0	0	0
		8	2	16	163	10.2	24	1

== Awards and recognition ==
Holohan is a member of the Greater Syracuse Hall of Fame.

== Personal life ==
Holohan's father served in World War II. He is married with two daughters.
