= Russ Ball =

American football executive (born 1959)

Green Bay Packers
- Title: Executive vice president Director of football operations

Personal information
- Born: August 28, 1959 (age 67); Moberly, Missouri, U.S.

Career information
- Position: Center
- College: Central Missouri

Career history
- Missouri (1982–1989) Head strength and conditioning coach; Kansas City Chiefs (1989–1996) Assistant strength and conditioning coach; Kansas City Chiefs (1997–1998) Administrative assistant to the head coach; Minnesota Vikings (1999–2000) Senior football administrator; Washington Redskins (2001) Director of football administration; New Orleans Saints (2002–2005) Senior football administrator; New Orleans Saints (2006–2007) Vice president of football administration; Green Bay Packers (2008–2017) Vice president of football administration/player finance; Green Bay Packers (2018–present) Executive vice president/director of football operations

Awards and highlights
- Super Bowl champion (XLV)
- Executive profile at Pro Football Reference

Russ Ball (born August 28, 1959) is an American football executive who is the executive vice president/director of football operations for the Green Bay Packers of the National Football League (NFL). He joined the team in 2008 and served as the vice president of football administration/player finance before being promoted to executive vice president/director of football operations in 2018.

== Biography ==
Born in Moberly, Missouri, Ball is a graduate of the University of Central Missouri and the University of Missouri. He is married to Diana and has two children.

== Career ==
During college, Ball played center with the Central Missouri Mules football team. Later Ball served as head strength and conditioning coach for the Missouri Tigers football team from 1982 to 1989. From there he spent ten seasons with the National Football League's Kansas City Chiefs, first serving as assistant strength and conditioning coach, and later as the administrative assistant to the head coach. In 1999, he became the senior football administrator for the Minnesota Vikings. He became the director of football administration for the Washington Redskins in 2001. From 2002 to 2007 he worked with the New Orleans Saints, first as their senior football administrator, later as vice president of football administration.

Ball was hired by the Green Bay Packers on February 14, 2008, as their vice president of football administration/player finance. He was promoted to executive vice president/director of football operations on January 8, 2018.

On January 30, 2026, Ball and the Packers agreed to a contract extension.
