= Darvin Wallis =

American football coach (1949–2009)

Personal information
- Born: April 14, 1949; Fort Branch, Indiana, U.S.
- Died: October 23, 2009 (aged 60); Red Feather Lakes, Colorado, U.S.

Career information
- College: Arizona

Career history
- Cleveland Browns (1982–1988) Special assistant; Kansas City Chiefs (1989–2007) Defensive assistant/quality control

Darvin Leon Wallis (February 14, 1949 – October 23, 2009) was an American professional football coach. He was a special assistant for the Cleveland Browns from 1982 to 1988 and a defensive assistant/quality control coach for the Kansas City Chiefs from 1989 to 2007.

Wallis died in Red Feather Lakes, Colorado from a heart attack on October 23, 2009, at the age of 60. Marty Schottenheimer said Wallis "was at the forefront of the coaching profession's analysis of trends through video analysis. In the role in which he was cast, I've never been with one better – the best I was ever involved with."
