= Dave Redding =

American football coach

Profile
- Position: Defensive coordinator

Personal information
- Born: Holdenville, Oklahoma, U.S.

Career information
- College: University of Nebraska–Lincoln

Career history
- Strength and Conditioning Coach: Washington State Cougars football; Missouri Tigers football; Cleveland Browns; Kansas City Chiefs (1989–1997); San Diego Chargers (2002–2006); Green Bay Packers (2009–2011)

Awards and highlights
- USA Strength and Conditioning Coaches Hall of Fame (2006)

Dave Redding is a former assistant strength and conditioning coach for the Green Bay Packers.

== Biography ==
A native of Holdenville, Oklahoma, Redding has one daughter, Taylor. He attended the University of Nebraska–Lincoln where he was a three-year letterman on the Nebraska Cornhuskers football team.

== Coaching career ==
Redding's first coaching position was as a graduated assistant with the Cornhuskers in 1976. The following year, he became the first Strength and Conditioning Coach of the Washington State Cougars. Later he also became the first Strength and Conditioning Coach of the Missouri Tigers and the Cleveland Browns. He later served as Strength and Conditioning Coach of the Kansas City Chiefs from 1989 to 1997, the Washington Redskins in 2001, and the San Diego Chargers from 2002 to 2006. Redding joined the Packers in 2009 as strength and conditioning coordinator, and in 2010, he was an assistant strength and conditioning coach for the Packers; Redding retired on February 21, 2011.

Redding was inducted in the USA Strength and Conditioning Coaches Hall of Fame in 2006.
