= Tim Barnett (American football) =

American football player (born 1968)

No. 82
- Position: Wide receiver

Personal information
- Born: April 19, 1968 (age 58); Gunnison, Mississippi, U.S.
- Listed height: 6 ft 1 in (1.85 m)
- Listed weight: 209 lb (95 kg)

Career information
- College: Jackson State
- NFL draft: 1991: 3rd round, 77th overall pick

Career history
- Kansas City Chiefs (1991–1993); Scottish Claymores (1995)

Career NFL statistics
- Receptions: 82
- Receiving yards: 1,188
- Receiving touchdowns: 10
- Stats at Pro Football Reference

Tim Andre Barnett (born April 19, 1968) is an American former professional football player who was a wide receiver for three seasons with the Kansas City Chiefs in the National Football League (NFL). He was selected by the Chiefs in the third round of the 1991 NFL Draft with the 77th overall pick.

== College statistics ==
- 1989: 9 TD
- 1990: 731 yards with 8 TD

== Legal issues ==
Barnett was convicted of second-degree sexual assault after allegedly exposing himself to a 14-year-old hotel maid in Milwaukee, Wisconsin on June 14, 1994. He was sentenced to three years in prison. Barnett was released from the Chiefs after being charged, ending his NFL career.
