= Tom Dohring =

American football player (born 1968)

No. 71
- Position: Offensive tackle

Personal information
- Born: May 24, 1968; Detroit, Michigan, U.S.
- Listed height: 6 ft 6 in (1.98 m)
- Listed weight: 290 lb (132 kg)

Career information
- High school: Divine Child (Dearborn, Michigan)
- College: Michigan
- NFL draft: 1991: 8th round, 218th overall pick

Career history
- Kansas City Chiefs (1991–1992)

Awards and highlights
- First-team All-Big Ten (1990)

Career NFL statistics
- Games played: 3
- Games started: 1
- Stats at Pro Football Reference

Thomas Edward Dohring (born May 24, 1968) is an American former professional football player who was a tackle for the Kansas City Chiefs of the National Football League (NFL). He played college football for the Michigan Wolverines from 1987 to 1990 and in the NFL for Chiefs in 1992.

== Early life ==
A native of Detroit, Michigan, Dohring attended Divine Child High School in Dearborn, Michigan.

== University of Michigan ==
Dohring played college football as an offensive tackle at the University of Michigan from 1987 to 1990. Dohring started 34 consecutive games for Michigan during those years. He helped lead the 1990 Michigan Wolverines football team to a Big Ten Conference championship and a victory over Ole Miss in the 1991 Gator Bowl. First-year head coach Gary Moeller praised the work of Dorhing and the other offensive linemen for the 1990 team: "It's nice to have the running backs we do, but when you're running behind Tom Dohring, Joe Cocozzo, Matt Elliott and Greg Skrepenak, it's a big help." Dohring was selected by the conference coaches as a member of the first-team All-Big Ten offensive unit at the end of November 1990.

== Kansas City Chiefs ==
Dohring was selected by the Kansas City Chiefs in the eighth round (218th overall pick) in the 1991 NFL draft. After suffering a sprained ankle in August 1991, Dohring spent the 1991 NFL season on the injured reserve list. He sustained another ankle injury in August 1992 and spent most of the 1992 NFL season on the Chiefs' practice squad. He was activated in late November 1992 to replace running back Bill Jones who was released. He made his NFL debut as the Chiefs' right tackle on December 6, 1992, in a loss to the Los Angeles Raiders. Dohring was deactivated in early January 1993 to make room on the roster for Albert Lewis. He was released by the Chiefs in late August 1993.
