= Derrick Graham (American football) =

American football player (born 1967)

No. 74, 77
- Position: Offensive tackle

Personal information
- Born: March 18, 1967 (age 59); Groveland, Florida, U.S.
- Listed height: 6 ft 4 in (1.93 m)
- Listed weight: 310 lb (141 kg)

Career information
- High school: Groveland
- College: Appalachian State
- NFL draft: 1990: 5th round, 124th overall pick

Career history
- Kansas City Chiefs (1990–1994); Carolina Panthers (1995); Seattle Seahawks (1996–1997); Oakland Raiders (1998); Los Angeles Xtreme (2001)

Career NFL statistics
- Games played: 99
- Games started: 60
- Stats at Pro Football Reference

Dettrice Anthony Graham (born March 18, 1967) is an American former professional football player who was an offensive tackle for four teams in the National Football League (NFL). Graham was born in Groveland, Florida, where he attended Groveland High School. He played college football for the Appalachian State Mountaineers and was selected by the Kansas City Chiefs in the fifth round of the 1990 NFL draft with the 124th overall pick.

Pre-draft measurables
Height	Weight	Arm length	Hand span	40-yard dash	10-yard split	20-yard split	20-yard shuttle	Vertical jump	Broad jump	Bench press
6 ft 4 1/2 in (1.94 m)	312 lb (142 kg)	33 in (0.84 m)	10 5/8 in (0.27 m)	5.47 s	2.01 s	3.18 s	5.20 s	24.5 in (0.62 m)	7 ft 9 in (2.36 m)	18 reps
All values from NFL Combine

He played for the Chiefs until 1994. Then he played for the Carolina Panthers in 1995, the Seattle Seahawks in 1996 and 1997, and the Oakland Raiders in 1998.
