= Leonard Griffin (American football) =

American football player (born 1962)

No. 92
- Position: Defensive end

Personal information
- Born: September 22, 1962 (age 64); Lake Providence, Louisiana, U.S.
- Listed height: 6 ft 4 in (1.93 m)
- Listed weight: 270 lb (122 kg)

Career information
- High school: Lake Providence (LA)
- College: Grambling State
- NFL draft: 1986: 3rd round, 63rd overall pick

Career history
- Kansas City Chiefs (1986–1993)

Career NFL statistics
- Games played: 103
- Sacks: 16.5
- Fumble recoveries: 1
- Stats at Pro Football Reference

Leonard James Griffin Jr. (born September 22, 1962) is an American former professional football player who was a defensive end for eight seasons in the National Football League (NFL) for the Kansas City Chiefs. He was selected by the Chiefs in the third round of the 1986 NFL draft out of Grambling State. Where in his final college season recorded 79 Tackles, including 18 tackles for loss and 9 QB sacks, according to the 1987 Kansas City Chiefs Media Guide.

He retired from the NFL in 1994 and was hired as the strength and conditioning coach at his alma mater, Grambling State University under the leadership of legendary coach Eddie Robinson and then Doug Williams. He remained at university coaching and mentoring college athletes there through 2005. Leonard Griffin, then took up teaching at West Ouachita High School. He began as a P.E. teacher and a Defensive Line Coach, before going into administration at the school. He retired from West Ouachita High School after the 2021–2022 school year.
