= Joe Valerio =

American football player (born 1969)

No. 73, 64
- Positions: Offensive tackle, center

Personal information
- Born: February 11, 1969 (age 57); Swarthmore, Pennsylvania, U.S.
- Listed height: 6 ft 5 in (1.96 m)
- Listed weight: 295 lb (134 kg)

Career information
- High school: Ridley (Folsom, Pennsylvania)
- College: Penn
- NFL draft: 1991: 2nd round, 50th overall pick

Career history
- Kansas City Chiefs (1991–1995); St. Louis Rams (1996)

Awards and highlights
- 2× First-team All-Ivy League (1989, 1990); Penn Athletic Hall of Fame (2005)

Career NFL statistics
- Games played: 62
- Games started: 4
- Receptions: 4
- Receiving yards: 7
- Touchdowns: 4
- Stats at Pro Football Reference

Joe William Valerio (born February 11, 1969) is an American former professional football player who was an offensive lineman in the National Football League (NFL). He played college football for the Penn Quakers and was selected by the Kansas City Chiefs in the second round of the 1991 NFL draft.

== College career ==
Valerio attended the University of Pennsylvania, majoring in economics. In 1987, he was named the Offensive Most Valuable Player (MVP) of the freshman team. In 1988, he was the only sophomore to letter on offense for a team that went 9-1 and won the Ivy League championship. As a junior in 1989, he was named First-team All-Ivy League, and received the schools Bagnell Award, an award given to the most improved player. As a senior in 1990, he was named a team captain, and a pre-season All-American. After the end of his senior season, he was awarded the Bednarik award for the team's top lineman, the Munger award for being the team's MVP, as well as first-team All-Ivy League for a second time, first-team All-ECAC, first-team All-America (Associated Press and Walter Camp). He was also selected to play in the East-West Shrine Game.

== Professional career ==
Pre-draft measurables
Height	Weight	Arm length	Hand span	40-yard dash	10-yard split	20-yard split	20-yard shuttle	Three-cone drill	Vertical jump	Broad jump	Bench press
6 ft 3 in (1.91 m)	295 lb (134 kg)	32 in (0.81 m)	11 in (0.28 m)	5.18 s	1.78 s	2.99 s	4.49 s	N/A s	28.5 in (0.72 m)	9 ft 1 in (2.77 m)	22 reps
All measurables from the NFL Scouting Combine.

Valerio was selected in the second round (50th overall) of the 1991 NFL draft by the Kansas City Chiefs. During his time with the Chiefs, he was occasionally placed as a tight end in the Chiefs "jumbo" formations in short yardage situations. He recorded 4 receptions for 7 yards, and 4 touchdowns. He was released by the Chiefs on August 25, 1996. In September 1996 he joined the St. Louis Rams. While with the Rams, he appeared in just one game.

In 2005, Valerio was inducted into the University of Pennsylvania Athletics Hall of Fame.

== Post-football career ==
Valerio retired after the 1996 season and began working in the insurance industry by serving as a Regional Operations Officer at Willis North America, Inc. He then served as the Managing Director for Wells Fargo Insurance Services in Philadelphia. Then in 2011, he began to work at TD Insurance/USI Insurance Services, as the Senior Vice President of Regional Sales Manager for the Mid-Atlantic Region. In June 2013, he joined Lyons Companies as the Vice President of Business Development.

He also served as an assistant football coach at Garnet Valley High School in Glen Mills, Pennsylvania.

== Personal life ==
Valerio appeared as a contestant on The Price Is Right on April 18, 1995, where he told Bob Barker he played for the Chiefs.

As of 2011, Valerio was married to his wife Jennifer, and had triplet daughters.
