= Christian Okoye =

Ìgbo-American football player (born 1961)

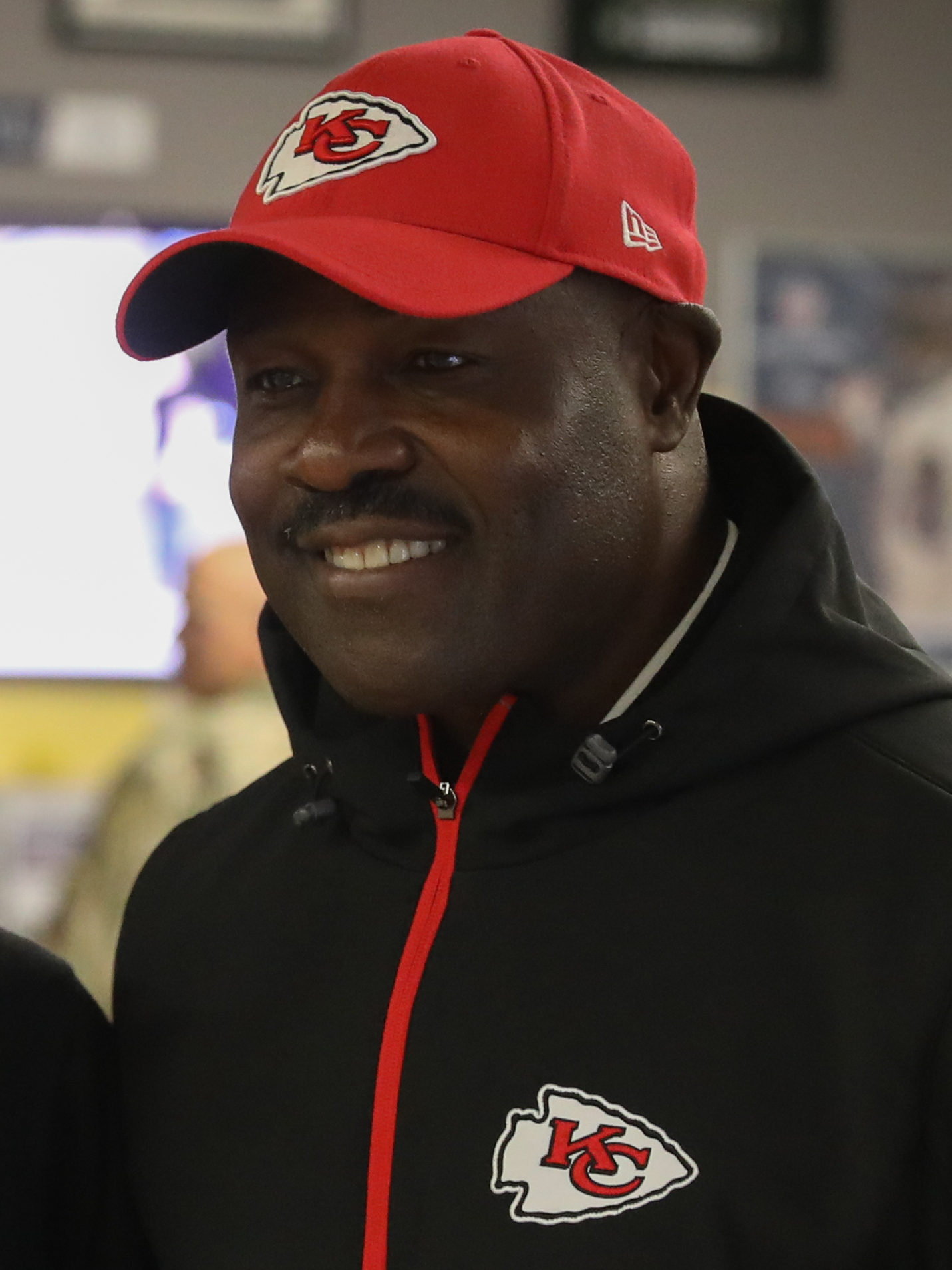
- Okoye in 2023

No. 35
- Position: Fullback

Personal information
- Born: August 16, 1961 (age 65); Enugu, Nigeria
- Listed height: 6 ft 1 in (1.85 m)
- Listed weight: 253 lb (115 kg)

Career information
- College: Azusa Pacific
- NFL draft: 1987: 2nd round, 35th overall pick

Career history
- Kansas City Chiefs (1987–1993)

Awards and highlights
- First-team All-Pro (1989); Second-team All-Pro (1991); 2× Pro Bowl (1989, 1991); NFL rushing yards leader (1989); PFWA All-Rookie Team (1987); Kansas City Chiefs Hall of Fame

Career NFL statistics
- Rushing yards: 4,897
- Rushing average: 3.9
- Rushing touchdowns: 40 Sports career
Medal record
Men's athletics
Representing Nigeria
African Championships
Gold medal – first place	1985 Cairo	Discus throw
- Stats at Pro Football Reference

Christian Emeka Okoye (/oʊˈkɔɪeɪ/; born August 16, 1961) is a Nigerian–American former professional football fullback who played for the Kansas City Chiefs of the National Football League (NFL) from 1987 to 1992. Nicknamed "the Nigerian Nightmare", he was known for his powerful running style and ability to break tackles. His six-season NFL career produced an NFL rushing champion title in 1989, first-team All-Pro honors in 1989, second-team All-Pro honors in 1991, two Pro Bowl appearances in 1989 and 1991, and three playoff appearances. He ended his NFL career due to multiple injuries.

Okoye was inducted into the Kansas City Chiefs Hall of Fame in 2000. He never played football until the age of 23, but later led the NFL in rushing at age 28.

== College career ==
A member of the Igbo people, Okoye was born in Enugu, Nigeria. He arrived in the United States at age 21 and did not play American football until age 23, when he joined the football team at California's Azusa Pacific University, an NAIA program. In track and field, he won seven college titles in the shot put, discus, and hammer throw. The first time he attended an American football game, he found the game boring.

After the Nigerian government declined Okoye for the Olympics in track and field, he sought other activities and began playing American football. Initially, he did not enjoy the roughness of the game and considered quitting, but friends convinced him to continue playing. His speed (4.45-seconds in the 40-yard dash) was unusual for someone his size (6'1" and 260 lbs), and this combination of talents led to his selection by the Kansas City Chiefs in the second round of the 1987 NFL draft.

== Professional career ==
Pre-draft measurables
Height	Weight	Arm length	Hand span	Vertical jump	Bench press
6 ft 1 5/8 in (1.87 m)	250 lb (113 kg)	33 in (0.84 m)	9 3/4 in (0.25 m)	31.0 in (0.79 m)	21 reps
All values from NFL Combine

In his rookie year, Okoye rushed for 660 yards on 157 carries. The following year, a thumb injury limited him to nine games, and he finished the season with 473 yards. In 1989, Okoye had his best statistical season, leading the league in both rushing attempts (370) and rushing yards (1,480), becoming the first Chiefs player to lead the NFL in rushing. Although the Chiefs missed the playoffs, Okoye was selected by UPI as the American Football Conference's Offensive Player of the Year and earned entry to the Pro Bowl in Hawaii.

The remainder of Okoye's career was marked by a nagging knee injury, which limited him to 805 yards and a 3.3 yard average per carry in 1990. Though his 1991 performance (1,031 yards and 4.6 yards per carry) earned him his second Pro Bowl appearance, his carries in 1992 were largely limited to goal-line situations. His last carry as a professional football running back was an 8-yard touchdown. On August 25, 1993, Chiefs placed him on injured reserve before the regular season began due to knee injuries. He underwent surgeries on both knees and was released on an injury settlement that September. He went home to California to continue rehabilitating his knee. He intended to work out for other teams before ultimately retiring. He has stated that he ended his NFL career because he became tired of practice, and that he considered football to be a job.

Okoye retired as the all-time rushing leader of the Chiefs, having amassed 4,897 yards, 1,246 attempts, and 14 games with at least 100 yards rushing, in his six seasons. Those team records have since been surpassed by Priest Holmes. His 40 career rushing touchdowns as a member of the Chiefs trail only Holmes and Marcus Allen. His Chiefs records for carries in a game and rushing attempts in a season were surpassed by Larry Johnson. Okoye was the team MVP in 1989, and was enshrined in the Chiefs Hall of Fame in 2000. Okoye is known amongst video game enthusiasts for his appearance in Tecmo Super Bowl (1991), in which he is nearly impossible to tackle.

== NFL career statistics ==
Legend
	Led the league
**Bold**	Career high

Year	Team	GP	GS	Att	Yds	Avg	Lng	TD	Rec	Yds	Avg	Lng	TD
1987	KC	12	12	157	660	4.2	43	3	**24**	**169**	7.0	**22**	0
1988	KC	9	9	105	473	4.4	48	3	8	51	6.4	12	0
1989	KC	**15**	**14**	**370**	**1,480**	4.0	**59**	**12**	2	12	6.0	8	0
1990	KC	14	13	245	805	3.3	32	7	4	23	5.8	8	0
1991	KC	14	12	225	1,031	**4.6**	48	9	3	34	**11.3**	13	0
1992	KC	**15**	5	144	448	3.1	22	6	1	5	5.0	5	0
Career		79	65	1,246	4,897	3.9	59	40	42	294	7.0	22	0

== Post-NFL career ==
Okoye was an investor in the Golden Baseball League and owned Okoye Health and Fitness, a company that sells nutritional supplements. He appeared as a boxer on the FX Network's Celebrity Boxing special. He founded the California Sports Hall of Fame, of which he is president. He appeared on the CBS reality show Pirate Master and was voted off by his shipmates on the second episode for his slow speed in the Expedition, receiving no gold. He appeared on Pros vs Joes in its third season.

The Christian Okoye Foundation sponsors the Ontario Mills 5K and 10K race, benefiting local after-school athletic programs in the Inland Empire. Okoye is part of the ownership team of the Kansas City Goats, an indoor football team that plays in The Arena League.

== Personal life ==
As a child in Nigeria, Okoye became good friends with Olympian Innocent Egbunike. When Egbunike began attending Azusa Pacific, he recommended Okoye for his discus abilities to track and field coaches, who offered Okoye a scholarship. Okoye's daughter is Tiana Okoye, known for her acting roles in Panhandle and Twisted Metal.
