= Tracy Rogers =

American football player (born 1967)

No. 52
- Position: Linebacker

Personal information
- Born: August 13, 1967 (age 59); Taft, California, U.S.
- Listed height: 6 ft 2 in (1.88 m)
- Listed weight: 244 lb (111 kg)

Career information
- High school: Taft Union
- College: Fresno State
- NFL draft: 1989: 7th round, 190th overall pick

Career history
- Houston Oilers (1989)*; Kansas City Chiefs (1990–1996)
- * Offseason or practice squad member only

Career NFL statistics
- Tackles: 151
- Fumble recoveries: 2
- Forced fumbles: 1
- Stats at Pro Football Reference

Tracy Darin Rogers (born August 13, 1967) is an American former professional football player who was a linebacker for seven seasons in the National Football League (NFL) for the Kansas City Chiefs. He played college football for the Fresno State Bulldogs and was selected by the Houston Oilers in the seventh round of the 1989 NFL draft with the 190th overall pick.
