= Tom Sims (American football) =

American football player and coach (born 1967)

Wayne State Warriors
- Title: Defensive coordinator & defensive line coach

Personal information
- Born: April 18, 1967 (age 59); Detroit, Michigan, U.S.
- Listed height: 6 ft 2 in (1.88 m)
- Listed weight: 291 lb (132 kg)

Career information
- Position: Defensive tackle (No. 95, 92)
- High school: Cass Technical (Detroit)
- College: Pittsburgh
- NFL draft: 1990: 6th round, 152nd overall pick

Career history

Playing
- Kansas City Chiefs (1990–1992); Indianapolis Colts (1993–1994); Minnesota Vikings (1995)*; Kansas City Chiefs (1996)
- * Offseason or practice squad member only

Coaching
- Western Kentucky (1997–1999) Defensive line coach; Eastern Michigan (2000) Defensive line coach; Minnesota (2001–2004) Defensive line coach; Illinois (2005–2008) Defensive line coach; Kansas (2009) Defensive line coach; Youngstown State (2010–2014) Defensive line coach; Pittsburgh (2015–2016) Defensive line coach; Baltimore Ravens (2017) Camp assistant; Savannah State (2018) Defensive line coach; Savannah State (2019–2021) Defensive coordinator; Arkansas-Pine Bluff (2022) Co-defensive coordinator; Wayne State (2023–present) Defensive coordinator & defensive line coach

Career NFL statistics
- Tackles: 65
- Sacks: 4
- Fumble recoveries: 1
- Stats at Pro Football Reference

Thomas Sidney Sims (born April 18, 1967) is an American football coach and former defensive tackle. He is the defensive coordinator and defensive line coach for Wayne State University, positions he has held since 2023. He also played four seasons in the National Football League (NFL) with the Kansas City Chiefs and Indianapolis Colts. He was drafted by the Chiefs in the sixth round of the 1990 NFL draft. He first played college football for the Broncos of Western Michigan University before transferring to play for the Pittsburgh Panthers of the University of Pittsburgh. He attended Cass Technical High School in Detroit, Michigan.

== College career ==
Sims graduated from Pittsburgh with a business degree in 1990.

== Professional career ==
Sims was drafted by the Kansas City Chiefs in the sixth round, with the 152nd overall pick, of the 1990 NFL draft. In early September 1990, before the start of the regular season, Sims was placed on injured reserve with an ankle injury. He did not appear in a game in 1990. He played in 14 games for the Chiefs in 1991 and recorded 6 total tackles. (Note: NFL tackle statistics are unofficial and were not consistently recorded before 1994.) He signed with the Chiefs in July 1992. He appeared in 12 games in 1992, recording 12 total tackles, 3.0 sacks and 1 fumble recovery. He was released by the Chiefs on September 4, 1993.

Sims signed with the Indianapolis Colts in early November 1993. He played in 5 games, starting 3, for the Colts in 1993 and recorded 30 total tackles and 1.0 sack. He played in 16 games, starting 1, in 1994 and recorded 12 solo tackles and 5 tackle assists.

Sims was signed by the Minnesota Vikings on June 2, 1995. He was released by the Vikings on August 28, 1995.

Sims signed with the Kansas City Chiefs on March 18, 1996. He spent time with the Chiefs during the 1996 regular season but did not appear in any games.

== Coaching career ==
Sims has been the defensive line coach at seven colleges. He coached the Hilltoppers of Western Kentucky University from 1997 to 1999, the Eagles of Eastern Michigan University in 2000, the Golden Gophers of the University of Minnesota from 2001 to 2004, the Fighting Illini of the University of Illinois from 2005 to 2008, the Jayhawks of the University of Kansas in 2009, the Penguins of Youngstown State University from 2010 to 2014, and the Pittsburgh Panthers from 2015 to 2016.

Sims was with the Ravens Camp in 2017 before being hired as the defensive line coach at Savannah State in 2018. The following years, Sims was promoted to defensive coordinator by new head coach Shawn Quinn, where he remained through the 2021 season. In his first year as a coordinator, Sims lead the number 1 scoring defense in the SIAC, and helped lead the Tigers to a 7–3 record. This was the first winning season for the Tigers in over 20 years.

In March 2022, Sims joined the staff at Arkansas-Pine Bluff as the co-defensive coordinator and defensive line coach.
