= Charles Mincy =

American football player (born 1969)

No. 42, 21, 22
- Position: Safety

Personal information
- Born: December 16, 1969 (age 56); Los Angeles, California, U.S.
- Listed height: 6 ft 0 in (1.83 m)
- Listed weight: 195 lb (88 kg)

Career information
- High school: Susan Miller Dorsey (CA)
- College: Pasadena City College; Washington
- NFL draft: 1991: 5th round, 133rd overall pick

Career history
- Kansas City Chiefs (1991–1994); Minnesota Vikings (1995); Tampa Bay Buccaneers (1996–1998); Oakland Raiders (1999)

Awards and highlights
- First-team All-Pac-10 (1990)

Career NFL statistics
- Tackles: 412
- Interceptions: 23
- Fumble recoveries: 7
- Stats at Pro Football Reference

Charles Anthony Mincy (born December 16, 1969) is an American former professional football player who was a defensive back in the National Football League (NFL).

Mincy was born in Los Angeles, California and attended Susan Miller Dorsey High School. He spent two years at Pasadena City College before transferring to the University of Washington.

Mincy was selected by the Kansas City Chiefs in the fifth round of the 1991 NFL draft with the 133rd overall pick. He spent four years with the Chiefs, followed by stints with the Minnesota Vikings, Tampa Bay Buccaneers, and Oakland Raiders.
