= 1993–94 NFL playoffs =

American football tournament

- Dates: January 8–30, 1994
- Season: 1993
- Teams: 12
- Games played: 11
- Super Bowl XXVIII site: Georgia Dome; Atlanta, Georgia
- Defending champions: Dallas Cowboys
- Champion: Dallas Cowboys (4th title)
- Runner-up: Buffalo Bills
- Conference runners-up: Kansas City Chiefs; San Francisco 49ers
NFL playoffs
← 1992–93	1994–95 →

The National Football League playoffs for the 1993 season began on January 8, 1994. The postseason tournament concluded with the Dallas Cowboys defeating the Buffalo Bills in Super Bowl XXVIII, 30–13, on January 30, at the Georgia Dome in Atlanta, Georgia.

Since the 1993 regular season was conducted over 18 weeks (two byes per team), the traditional bye week between the conference championship games and Super Bowl was removed.

== Participants ==
Within each conference, the three division winners and the three non-division winners with the best overall regular season records qualified for the playoffs. The three division winners were seeded 1–3 based on the overall won-lost-tied record, and the three wild card teams were seeded 4–6. The NFL did not use a fixed bracket playoff system, and there were no restrictions regarding teams from the same division matching up in any round. In the first round, dubbed the wild-card playoffs or wild-card weekend, the third-seeded division winner hosted the sixth seed wild card, and the fourth seed hosted the fifth. The 1 and 2 seeds from each conference received a first-round bye. In the second round, the divisional playoffs, the number 1 seed hosted the worst-remaining seed from the first round (seed 4, 5, or 6), while the number 2 seed played the other team (seed 3, 4, or 5). The two winning teams from each conference's divisional playoff games then meet in the respective AFC and NFC Conference Championship games, hosted by the higher seed. Although the Super Bowl, the championship round of the playoffs, was played at a neutral site, the designated home team was based on an annual rotation by conference.

Playoff seeds
Seed	AFC	NFC
1	Buffalo Bills (East winner)	Dallas Cowboys (East winner)
2	Houston Oilers (Central winner)	San Francisco 49ers (West winner)
3	Kansas City Chiefs (West winner)	Detroit Lions (Central winner)
4	Los Angeles Raiders (wild card)	New York Giants (wild card)
5	Denver Broncos (wild card)	Minnesota Vikings (wild card)
6	Pittsburgh Steelers (wild card)	Green Bay Packers (wild card)

== Bracket ==
Jan 9 – Giants Stadium	Jan 15 – Candlestick Park
5	Minnesota	10
4	NY Giants	3
4	NY Giants	17	Jan 23 – Texas Stadium
2	San Francisco	44
NFC
Jan 8 – Pontiac Silverdome	2	San Francisco	21
Jan 16 – Texas Stadium
1	Dallas	38
6	Green Bay	28	NFC Championship
6	Green Bay	17
3	Detroit	24	Jan 30 – Georgia Dome
1	Dallas	27
Wild Card playoffs
Divisional playoffs
Jan 8 – Arrowhead Stadium	N1	Dallas	30
Jan 16 – Astrodome
A1	Buffalo	13
6	Pittsburgh	24	Super Bowl XXVIII
3	Kansas City	28
3	Kansas City	27*	Jan 23 – Rich Stadium
2	Houston	20
AFC
Jan 9 – Los Angeles Memorial Coliseum	3	Kansas City	13
Jan 15 – Rich Stadium
1	Buffalo	30
5	Denver	24	AFC Championship
4	LA Raiders	23
4	LA Raiders	42
1	Buffalo	29

* Indicates overtime victory

== Schedule ==
These playoffs marked the final season that CBS was the NFC network. Fox would then take over the rights to the NFC before the start of the following season. ABC continued to broadcast the first two Wild Card playoff games, and NBC televised the rest of the AFC games. CBS would not televise an NFL game again until 1998 when it replaced NBC as the AFC network.

NBC was also the broadcaster of Super Bowl XXVIII.

Round	Away team	Score	Home team	Date	Kickoff (ET / UTC−5)	TV
Wild-card round	Pittsburgh Steelers	24–27 (OT)	Kansas City Chiefs	January 8, 1994	12:30 p.m.	ABC
Wild-card round	Green Bay Packers	28–24	Detroit Lions	January 8, 1994	4:00 p.m.	ABC
Wild-card round	Minnesota Vikings	10–17	New York Giants	January 9, 1994	12:30 p.m.	CBS
Wild-card round	Denver Broncos	24–42	Los Angeles Raiders	January 9, 1994	4:00 p.m.	NBC
Divisional round	Los Angeles Raiders	23–29	Buffalo Bills	January 15, 1994	12:30 p.m.	NBC
Divisional round	New York Giants	3–44	San Francisco 49ers	January 15, 1994	4:00 p.m.	CBS
Divisional round	Green Bay Packers	17–27	Dallas Cowboys	January 16, 1994	12:30 p.m.	CBS
Divisional round	Kansas City Chiefs	28–20	Houston Oilers	January 16, 1994	4:00 p.m.	NBC
Conference championships	Kansas City Chiefs	13–30	Buffalo Bills	January 23, 1994	12:30 p.m.	NBC
Conference championships	San Francisco 49ers	21–38	Dallas Cowboys	January 23, 1994	4:00 p.m.	CBS
Super Bowl XXVIII Georgia Dome Atlanta, Georgia	Dallas Cowboys	30–13	Buffalo Bills	January 30, 1994	6:20 p.m.	NBC

== Wild-card round ==
=== Saturday, January 8, 1994 ===
==== AFC: Kansas City Chiefs 27, Pittsburgh Steelers 24 (OT) ====
Pittsburgh Steelers vs. Kansas City Chiefs – Game summary

Quarter	1	2	3	4	OT	Total
Steelers	7	10	0	7	0	24
Chiefs	7	0	3	14	3	27

at Arrowhead Stadium, Kansas City, Missouri

- Game time: 12:30 p.m. EST/11:30 a.m. CST
- Game weather: 34 °F (1 °C), clear
- Game attendance: 74,515
- Referee: Gary Lane
- TV announcers (ABC): Al Michaels (play-by-play), Frank Gifford, and Dan Dierdorf (color commentators)
- Recap, Game Book

Game information

First quarter

- PIT – Adrian Cooper 10-yard pass from Neil O'Donnell (Gary Anderson kick). Steelers 7–0.
- KC – J. J. Birden 23-yard pass from Dave Krieg (Nick Lowery kick). Tied 7–7.

Second quarter

- PIT – Gary Anderson 30-yard field goal. Steelers 10–7.
- PIT – Ernie Mills 26-yard pass from Neil O'Donnell (Gary Anderson kick). Steelers 17–7.

Third quarter

- KC – Nick Lowery 23-yard field goal. Steelers 17–10.

Fourth quarter

- KC – Marcus Allen 2-yard run (Lin Elliott kick). Tied 17–17.
- PIT – Eric Green 22-yard pass from Neil O'Donnell (Gary Anderson kick). Steelers 24–17.
- KC – Tim Barnett 7-yard pass from Joe Montana (Nick Lowery kick). Tied 24–24.

Overtime

- KC – Nick Lowery 32-yard field goal. Chiefs 27–24.

Top passers

- PIT – Neil O'Donnell – 23/42, 286 yards, 3 TD
- KC – Joe Montana – 28/43, 276 yards, TD

Top rushers

- PIT – Leroy Thompson – 25 rushes, 60 yards
- KC – Marcus Allen – 21 rushes, 67 yards, TD

Top receivers

- PIT – Jeff Graham – 7 receptions, 96 yards
- KC – J. J. Birden – 6 receptions, 72 yards, TD

Chiefs kicker Nick Lowery made the winning 32-yard field goal after 11:03 of overtime, to earn themselves a win over the Steelers in a game in which both teams combined for 770 yards, no fumbles lost, and no interceptions.

The Steelers scored first by driving 66 yards, featuring a 32-yard reception by running back Merril Hoge, and scoring on Neil O'Donnell's 10-yard touchdown pass to tight end Adrian Cooper. Later in the first quarter, Kansas City drove 75 yards in seven plays and tied the game after backup quarterback Dave Krieg, who temporarily replaced injured starter Joe Montana, threw a 23-yard touchdown to wide receiver J. J. Birden.

The Steelers responded with a long 15-play drive to retake the lead on Gary Anderson's 30-yard field goal, making the score 10–7. After a punt, Pittsburgh drove back to the Chiefs 35-yard line, only to turn the ball over on downs. Kansas City then took over and drove to the Steelers 42, but on fourth down and 1, defensive end Gerald Williams sacked Montana for a 7-yard loss, giving his team the ball on their own 49 with under a minute left. The Steelers made the most of their opportunity, scoring on O'Donnell's 26-yard touchdown completion to Ernie Mills that increased their lead to 17–7 at the end of the half.

Most of the third quarter was a defensive struggle until the Chiefs put together a 49-yard drive to score on Lowery's 23-yard field goal. Then in the fourth quarter, Montana connected with Willie Davis for 22 yards and Birden for 19 on the way to Marcus Allen's 2-yard touchdown run that tied the game at 17. O'Donnell led the Steelers right back though, completing a 26-yard pass to Dwight Stone before hooking up with Eric Green for a 22-yard touchdown throw to retake the lead, 24–17.

In the final minutes of regulation, tight end Keith Cash blocked a Pittsburgh punt and Fred Jones returned it 31 yards to the Steelers 9-yard line. On fourth down, Montana threw a 7-yard touchdown pass to wide receiver Tim Barnett, tying the game at 24 with 1:43 left in the game. Then after forcing Pittsburgh to punt, Kansas City drove 47 yards to set up Lowery's 43-yard field-goal attempt in the closing seconds, but the kick was wide right and thus the game went into overtime.

Kansas City won the coin toss to receive the overtime kickoff, but went three and out. Pittsburgh then drove to midfield before they also had to punt. At this point, Montana completed several passes, including an 18-yarder to Cash to move the Chiefs into position for Lowery's game winning score.

Montana finished the game 23/42 for 276 passing yards and a touchdown, with no interceptions. O'Donnell completed 23/42 passes for 286 yards and three scores.

This was the Chiefs last playoff win at home until the 2018 season.

This was the first postseason meeting between the Steelers and Chiefs.

==== NFC: Green Bay Packers 28, Detroit Lions 24 ====
Green Bay Packers vs. Detroit Lions – Game summary

Quarter	1	2	3	4	Total
Packers	0	7	14	7	28
Lions	3	7	7	7	24

at Pontiac Silverdome, Pontiac, Michigan

- Game time: 4:00 p.m. EST/3:00 p.m. CST
- Game weather: Played indoors, domed stadium
- Game attendance: 68,479
- Referee: Tom White
- TV announcers (ABC): Brent Musburger (play-by-play) and Dick Vermeil (color commentator)

Game information

First quarter

- DET – Jason Hanson 47-yard field goal. Lions 3–0.

Second quarter

- GB – Sterling Sharpe 12-yard pass from Brett Favre Chris Jacke kick. Packers 7–3.
- DET – Brett Perriman 1-yard pass from Erik Kramer (Jason Hanson kick). Lions 10–7.

Third quarter

- DET – Melvin Jenkins 15-yard interception return (Jason Hanson kick). Lions 17–7.
- GB – Sterling Sharpe 28-yard pass from Brett Favre (Chris Jacke kick). Lions 17–14.
- GB – George Teague 101-yard interception return (Chris Jacke kick). Packers 21–17.

Fourth quarter

- DET – Derrick Moore 5-yard run (Jason Hanson kick). Lions 24–21.
- GB – Sterling Sharpe 40-yard pass from Brett Favre (Chris Jacke kick). Packers 28–24.

Top passers

- GB – Brett Favre – 15/26, 204 yards, 3 TD, INT
- DET – Erik Kramer – 22/31, 248 yards, TD, 2 INT

Top rushers

- GB – Darrell Thompson – 12 rushes, 41 yards
- DET – Barry Sanders – 27 rushes, 169 yards

Top receivers

- GB – Sterling Sharpe – 5 receptions, 101 yards, 3 TD
- DET – Brett Perriman – 10 receptions, 150 yards, TD

In week 17, the Lions defeated Green Bay 30–20, intercepting four passes from quarterback Brett Favre and winning despite playing without their best offensive star, running back Barry Sanders. The win gave them homefield advantage for this game. But even though Sanders recovered from his injury in time for the playoffs, this time the Packers won by overcoming a 17–7 third quarter deficit and pulling ahead on Favre's 40-yard game-winning touchdown pass to wide receiver Sterling Sharpe with 55 seconds left.

Detroit held the ball for over 10 minutes in the first quarter, but could only score three points. Early in the game, a 25-yard run by Sanders with an additional 15 yards added on by a facemask penalty on LeRoy Butler sparked a drive deep into Green Bay territory, but it ended with no points when Terrell Buckley intercepted a pass from Erik Kramer in the end zone. After forcing a punt, the Lions drove 59 yards, mostly on receptions by Brett Perriman, and scored on Jason Hanson's 47-yard field goal on the last play of the first quarter.

Green Bay responded to the field goal by driving 80 yards and scoring on Favre's 12-yard touchdown pass to Sharpe. Then Green Bay caught a break when their kickoff hit the ground near the sideline, bounced into returner Mel Gray and then bounced out of bounds at the Lions 5-yard line. But it didn't stop Detroit as they still drove 95 yards, featuring a 44-yard run by Sanders and a 13-yard third down conversion reception by Perriman after the ball bounced off Sanders' hands, and scored on Perriman's one handed 1-yard touchdown reception to take a 10–7 lead at the end of the half.

Midway through the third quarter, Jim Arnold's punt pinned Green Bay at their own 5-yard line. Two plays later, Melvin Jenkins intercepted a pass from Favre and returned it 15 yards for a touchdown to extend the Lions' lead, 17–7. But the Packers countered with a 72-yard drive to score on a 28-yard touchdown pass from Favre to Sharpe. Detroit responded by driving 74 yards, including a 31-yard catch by Perriman, to a 2nd and goal on the Green Bay 5-yard line. On the next play, Packers safety George Teague intercepted Kramer's pass in the end zone and returned it a playoff record 101 yards to give the Packers a 21–17 lead. But on their ensuing drive Lions would regain the lead by moving the ball 89 yards to score on running back Derrick Moore's 5-yard touchdown with 8:27 left in the fourth quarter.

Corey Harris' 45-yard kickoff return gave the Packers good field position, but they were unable to take advantage and had to punt after demoralizing third down play in which Favre overthrew wide open receiver Mark Clayton near the end zone. After forcing a punt, Robert Brooks' 21-yard return gave Green Bay the ball on their own 29-yard line with 2:24 left in regulation. Favre started off the drive with an 11-yard completion to Edgar Bennett. His next pass to tight end Ed West moved the ball 9 yards to midfield. Following a 4-yard run by Bennett, Favre's 6-yard completion to Sharpe advanced the team to the Lions 40-yard line. On the next play, he took the snap and ran left. Kevin Scott, who was covering Sharpe one on one along the right sideline, slowed down a bit when he saw Favre running, just enough for Sharpe to pull ahead of him and Favre launched a 40-yard pass to Sharpe in the end zone for the game winning score. Gray was tackled by Green Bay's Marcus Wilson after returning the ensuing kickoff just 8 yards to the 19-yard line, leaving Detroit with 51 seconds and all three timeouts left to drive for the winning touchdown. Over the next four plays, Tony Bennett sacked Kramer for 2-yard loss, Sanders picked up 3 yards on a swing pass, and Kramer threw two incompletions.

Sanders had the best postseason performance of his career, finishing the game with 167 rushing yards. Kramer completed 22/31 passes for 248 yards and a touchdown, with two interception. Perriman caught 10 passes for 150 yards and a touchdown. Favre completed 15/26 passes for 204 yards and three touchdowns, with one interception. Sharpe, who had not practiced in the last eight weeks due to turf toe (though he was still able to play in games) and had set the NFL single season record for receptions in their week 17 meeting against Detroit, caught five passes for 101 yards and tied a playoff record with three touchdowns. This was Scott's last game in the NFL.

The Lions lost despite significantly outgaining the Packers in total yards (410–293), first downs (25–16), and time of possession (35:34–24:26). "It's just a shame," Lions coach Wayne Fontes said after the game. "This team played an excellent football game today and lost. They couldn't slow us down."

This was the final playoff game at the Pontiac Silverdome. This was the last time the Lions hosted a playoff game until 2024. It was the franchise's first home playoff loss.

This was featured on NFL's Greatest Games as Favre to Sharpe. It was identified as one of the greatest moments in Wisconsin sports history.

This was the first postseason meeting between the Packers and Lions.

=== Sunday, January 9, 1994 ===
==== NFC: New York Giants 17, Minnesota Vikings 10 ====
Minnesota Vikings vs. New York Giants – Game summary

Quarter	1	2	3	4	Total
Vikings	0	10	0	0	10
Giants	3	0	14	0	17

at Giants Stadium, East Rutherford, New Jersey

- Game time: 12:30 p.m. EST
- Game weather: 32 °F (0 °C), clear
- Game attendance: 75,089
- Referee: Ed Hochuli
- TV announcers (CBS): Pat Summerall (play-by-play) and John Madden (color commentator)

Game information

First quarter

- NYG – David Treadwell 26-yard field goal. Giants 3–0.

Second quarter

- MIN – Cris Carter 40-yard pass from Jim McMahon (Fuad Reveiz kick). Vikings 7–3.
- MIN – Fuad Reveiz 52-yard field goal. Vikings 10–3.

Third quarter

- NYG – Rodney Hampton 51-yard run (David Treadwell kick). Tied 10–10.
- NYG – Rodney Hampton 2-yard run (David Treadwell kick). Giants 17–10.

Fourth quarter

- No scoring plays.

Top passers

- MIN – Jim McMahon – 12/25, 145 yards, TD
- NYG – Phil Simms – 17/26, 94 yards

Top rushers

- MIN – Scottie Graham – 19 rushes, 69 yards
- NYG – Rodney Hampton – 33 rushes, 161 yards, 2 TD

Top receivers

- MIN – Cris Carter – 4 reception, 83 yards, TD
- NYG – Chris Calloway – 2 receptions, 30 yards

A howling, gusting wind dominated the game as both teams could only score a combined 27 points. However, the Giants managed to score two touchdowns, both by running back Rodney Hampton in the third quarter, to pull ahead for good.

New York had the wind at their back in the first quarter, but could only score on kicker David Treadwell's 26-yard field goal on their opening drive. In the second quarter, they had another chance to score, but receiver Mark Jackson dropped a pass on third and 7 from the Vikings 7 and then Treadwell drilled a 34-yard field goal attempt wide left. Meanwhile, the Vikings went up 7–3 on Jim McMahon's 40-yard pass to wide receiver Cris Carter. Near the end of the half, Giants quarterback Phil Simms threw a third down pass to Dave Meggett that lost nine yards, bringing up fourth and 19 from the New York 23. On the next play, punter Mike Horan shanked a kick that went right into the back of teammate Greg Jackson, a blocker in the backfield, enabling the Vikings to take over on the Giants 36 with 29 seconds left in the half and take a 10–3 halftime lead on Fuad Reveiz's franchise postseason record 52-yard field goal.

The Giants had the wind again in the third quarter, and on their first drive of the second half, Hampton scored on a 51-yard rushing touchdown, the longest run in Giants postseason history. Then Harry Newsome's punt went just 21 yards to the Minnesota 26-yard line. Hampton subsequently converted a fourth and 1 situation with a 2-yard run and rushed for five yards on third and 2 as the team drove to another touchdown on his 2-yard score. On the extra point attempt, the snap sailed right through Horan's hands and went right into the arms of Treadwell. However, Treadwell managed to run the ball into the end zone for a successful conversion, giving the team a 17–10 lead.

Although the Vikings held the wind advantage again during the final quarter, the Giants defense managed to shut them down to preserve the victory. The Vikings had a great chance to tie the game when Carter caught a deep pass from backup quarterback Sean Salisbury and appeared to be on his way to a sure touchdown, but safety Myron Guyton caught up with him from behind and knocked the ball out of his hands. Jackson recovered it for the Giants on the Vikings 15-yard line to put the game away.

Hampton finished the game with 33 carries for 161 yards and two touchdowns, along with six receptions for 24 yards.

This was the first postseason meeting between the Vikings and Giants. This was also the final game of Vikings running back Roger Craig's career.

==== AFC: Los Angeles Raiders 42, Denver Broncos 24 ====
Denver Broncos vs. Los Angeles Raiders – Game summary

Quarter	1	2	3	4	Total
Broncos	7	14	0	3	24
Raiders	14	7	14	7	42

at Los Angeles Memorial Coliseum, Los Angeles, California

- Game time: 4:00 p.m. EST/1:00 p.m. PST
- Game weather: 70 °F (21 °C), clear
- Game attendance: 65,314
- Referee: Bob McElwee
- TV announcers (NBC): Charlie Jones (play-by-play) and Todd Christensen (color commentator)

Game information

First quarter

- RAI – Ethan Horton 9-yard pass from Jeff Hostetler (Jeff Jaeger kick). Raiders 7–0.
- DEN – Shannon Sharpe 23-yard pass from John Elway (Jason Elam kick). Tied 7–7.
- RAI – Tim Brown 65-yard pass from Jeff Hostetler (Jeff Jaeger kick). Raiders 14–7.

Second quarter

- DEN – Reggie Johnson 16-yard pass from John Elway (Jason Elam kick). Tied 14–14.
- RAI – James Jett 54-yard pass from Jeff Hostetler (Jeff Jaeger kick). Raiders 21–14.
- DEN – Derek Russell 6-yard pass from John Elway (Jason Elam kick). Tied 21–21.

Third quarter

- RAI – Napoleon McCallum 26-yard run (Jeff Jaeger kick). Raiders 28–21.
- RAI – Napoleon McCallum 2-yard run (Jeff Jaeger kick). Raiders 35–21.

Fourth quarter

- DEN – Jason Elam 23-yard field goal. Raiders 35–24.
- RAI – Napoleon McCallum 1-yard run (Jeff Jaeger kick). Raiders 42–24.

Top passers

- DEN – John Elway – 29/47, 302 yards, 3 TD, INT
- RAI – Jeff Hostetler – 13/19, 294 yards, 3 TD

Top rushers

- DEN – Robert Delpino – 9 rushes, 32 yards
- RAI – Napoleon McCallum – 13 rushes, 81 yards, 3 TD

Top receivers

- DEN – Shannon Sharpe – 13 receptions, 156 yards, TD
- RAI – James Jett – 3 receptions, 111 yards, TD

After a 21–21 tie at halftime, Raiders running back Napoleon McCallum scored three rushing touchdowns in the second half to lead his team to the victory.

Los Angeles opened up the scoring on their second drive, with Jeff Hostetler completing a 23-yard pass to Alexander Wright and a 45-yarder to James Jett before finishing the drive with a 9-yard touchdown toss to tight end Ethan Horton. Denver responded by driving 66 yards, including a 17-yard burst by Robert Delpino with a facemask penalty adding another 15, to score on John Elway's 23-yard touchdown pass to tight end Shannon Sharpe. But the tie only lasted a few minutes until Hostetler gave the Raiders a 14–7 lead with a 65-yard touchdown completion to Tim Brown on third and 12.

In the second quarter, Elway threw a 16-yard touchdown pass to tight end Reggie Johnson at the end of a 12-play drive that included his 25-yard completion to Derek Russell. But Hostetler promptly regained the lead for his team with a 54-yard touchdown bomb to Jett. Still Elway rallied Denver back, completing 8/10 passes for 66 yards on a 13-play, 77-yard drive, the last one a 6-yard score to Russell that tied the game with just 32 seconds left in the half. In the first half alone, Elway completed 18/25 passes for 199 yards, while Hostetler completed 6/9 passes for 202 yards and each had thrown three touchdowns.

In the second half, Los Angeles dominated the game. First, Tom Rouen's 30-yard punt enabled LA to take over the ball at the Denver 35-yard line, and to set up McCallum's 26-yard touchdown. Another short punt by the Broncos allowed the Raiders to take over at the Denver 48-yard line, and Hostetler's 33-yard pass to Horton enabled McCallum to rush for a 2-yard touchdown. After Broncos kicker Jason Elam made a 23-yard field goal to cut the lead, 35–24, the Raiders marched 76 yards in the fourth quarter to score on McCallum's 1-yard touchdown to clinch the victory.

Hostetler had one of the best performances of his career, completing 13 of 19 passes for 294 yards and three touchdowns. Elway completed 29 of 47 passes for 302 yards, three touchdowns, and an interception, while also rushing for 23 yards. Sharpe tied a playoff record with 13 receptions for 156 yards and a touchdown. Jett caught three passes for 111 yards and a score.

Los Angeles committed 17 penalties, a playoff record. This was the most recent NFL playoff game played in the city of Los Angeles until 2017, and the last playoff game won by an LA-based team until 2018.

This was the second postseason meeting between the Broncos and Raiders. Denver won the only prior meeting.

Previous playoff games
Denver leads 1–0 in all-time playoff games

1977

Oakland Raiders 17 @ Denver Broncos 20

1977 AFC Championship Game

== Divisional round ==
=== Saturday, January 15, 1994 ===
==== AFC: Buffalo Bills 29, Los Angeles Raiders 23 ====
Los Angeles Raiders vs. Buffalo Bills – Game summary

Quarter	1	2	3	4	Total
Raiders	0	17	6	0	23
Bills	0	13	9	7	29

at Rich Stadium, Orchard Park, New York

- Game time: 12:30 p.m. EST/9:30 a.m. PST
- Game weather: 0 °F (−18 °C), cloudy
- Game attendance: 61,923
- Referee: Red Cashion
- TV announcers (NBC): Marv Albert (play-by-play) and Paul Maguire (color commentator)

Game information

First quarter

- No scoring.

Second quarter

- RAI – Jeff Jaeger 30-yard field goal. Raiders 3–0.
- BUF – Kenneth Davis 1-yard run (kick failed). Bills 6–3.
- RAI – Napoleon McCallum 1-yard run (Jeff Jaeger kick). Raiders 10–6.
- RAI – Napoleon McCallum 1-yard run (Jeff Jaeger kick). Raiders 17–6.
- BUF – Thurman Thomas 8-yard run (Steve Christie kick). Raiders 17–13.

Third quarter

- BUF – Bill Brooks 25-yard pass from Jim Kelly (kick blocked). Bills 19–17.
- BUF – Steve Christie 29-yard field goal. Bills 22–17.

Fourth quarter

- RAI – Tim Brown 86-yard pass from Jeff Hostetler (kick failed). Raiders 23–22.
- BUF – Bill Brooks 22-yard pass from Jim Kelly (Steve Christie kick). Bills 29–23.

Top passers

- RAI – Jeff Hostetler – 14/20, 230 yards, TD
- BUF – Jim Kelly – 27/37, 287 yards, 2 TD

Top rushers

- RAI – Napoleon McCallum – 13 rushes, 56 yards, 2 TD
- BUF – Thurman Thomas – 14 rushes, 44 yards, TD

Top receivers

- RAI – Tim Brown – 5 receptions, 127 yards, TD
- BUF – Bill Brooks – 6 receptions, 96 yards, 2 TD

In one of the coldest games in NFL history, the Bills overcame a 17–13 Raiders lead by scoring three times in a span of 6:18 in the second half.

The Raiders got the first scoring opportunity of the game when quarterback Jeff Hostetler's first pass of the game was complete to Tyrone Montgomery for a 19-yard gain to the Bills 29-yard line. But a third down sack by Buffalo defensive end Bruce Smith halted the drive and Jeff Jaeger missed a field goal attempt from 47 yards. Buffalo then took over and drove to the Raiders 30-yard line, but also came up empty when Jim Kelly threw an incomplete pass on a fourth and 1 conversion attempt.

After the turnover, Hostetler threw a 36-yard completion to tight end Ethan Horton and a 12-yard completion to Nick Bell on the way to a 30-yard field goal by Jaeger, giving Los Angeles a 3–0 lead early in the second quarter. But Buffalo quickly stormed back with a huge play from special teams expert Steve Tasker, who snagged Jaeger's short kickoff out of the air while on the run and raced 67 yards to the Raiders 1-yard line before being shoved out of bounds by Willie Gault. Following an offsides penalty against the Raiders, running back Kenneth Davis' took the ball across the goal line on the next play, giving the Bills a 6–3 lead after Steve Christie missed the extra point.

Raiders receiver Raghib Ismail returned the ensuing kickoff 33 yards to his 43-yard line, sparking an 8-play, 57-yard drive that ended with a 1-yard touchdown run by Napoleon McCallum. Then on the first play after the kickoff, safety Eddie Anderson forced a fumble from Pete Metzelaars, and cornerback Terry McDaniel recovered the ball on the Bills 40-yard line, setting up McCallum's second 1-yard touchdown run (this one on a fourth down) to increase their lead to 17–6. But Buffalo, who had gained just 44 total yards at this point, struck right back with a 4-play, 76-yard touchdown drive. After three consecutive Kelly completions, a 37-yard pass interference penalty on Torin Dorn moved the ball to the Raiders 8-yard line, and Thurman Thomas ran it into the end zone from there, cutting the score to 17–13 with 50 seconds left in the half.

Buffalo started out the second half with a good drive into Raiders territory, but it ended with no points when Christie missed a 43-yard field goal try. Later on, the Bills scored three times in a span of 6:18 of the final two quarters to put the game away. Quarterback Jim Kelly first threw a 25-yard touchdown pass to wide receiver Bill Brooks at the end of a 5-play, 60-yard drive, giving Buffalo a 19–17 lead after Christie missed the extra point. Then after Bills safety Henry Jones recovered a fumble by McCallum that was forced by Smith, Christie kicked a 29-yard field goal. On the Raiders' next possession, wide receiver Tim Brown scored on an 86-yard touchdown reception from Hostetler. Jaeger hit the uprights on the extra point attempt, but Los Angeles retook the lead at 23–22 with less than a minute left in the third quarter. However, Buffalo then drove 71 yards to score on Brooks' 22-yard touchdown reception from Kelly with 12:05 left in the game.

Buffalo's defense kept Los Angeles pinned down for the remained of the quarter to clinch the victory, forcing punts on each of their next two drives. After the second punt, the Bills offense held onto the ball for the final six minutes of the game, featuring three first down runs by Davis, one of them a 17-yard gain.

Brown had the best postseason performance of his career, catching five passes for 127 yards and a touchdown. Kelly completed 27 of 37 passes for 287 yards and two touchdowns. Brooks caught six passes for 92 yards and two touchdowns. Smith had two sacks and a forced fumble. His two sacks gave his a career postseason total of 11, moving him past Richard Dent as the NFL's all-time leader in that category.

This was the final playoff game played by the Raiders as a Los Angeles-based team and their last as a franchise until 2000. This was the final playoff game played by a Los Angeles-based team until 2017.

This was the second postseason meeting between the Raiders and Bills. Buffalo won the only prior meeting.

Previous playoff games
Buffalo leads 1–0 in all-time playoff games

1990

Los Angeles Raiders 3 @ Buffalo Bills 51

1990 AFC Championship Game

==== NFC: San Francisco 49ers 44, New York Giants 3 ====
New York Giants vs. San Francisco 49ers – Game summary

Quarter	1	2	3	4	Total
Giants	0	3	0	0	3
49ers	9	14	14	7	44

at Candlestick Park, San Francisco, California

- Game time: 4:00 p.m. EST/1:00 p.m. PST
- Game weather: 59 °F (15 °C), clear
- Game attendance: 67,143
- Referee: Bernie Kukar
- TV announcers (CBS): Pat Summerall (play-by-play) and John Madden (color commentator)

Game information

First quarter

- SF – Ricky Watters 1-yard run (kick failed). 49ers 6–0.
- SF – Mike Cofer 29-yard field goal. 49ers 9–0.

Second quarter

- SF – Ricky Watters 1-yard run (Mike Cofer kick). 49ers 16–0.
- SF – Ricky Watters 2-yard run (Mike Cofer kick). 49ers 23–0.
- NYG – David Treadwell 25-yard field goal. 49ers 23–3.

Third quarter

- SF – Ricky Watters 6-yard run (Mike Cofer kick). 49ers 30–3.
- SF – Ricky Watters 2-yard run (Mike Cofer kick). 49ers 37–3.

Fourth quarter

- SF – Marc Logan 2-yard run (Mike Cofer kick). 49ers 44–3.

Top passers

- NYG – Phil Simms – 12/25, 124 yards, 2 INT
- SF – Steve Young – 17/22, 226 yards

Top rushers

- NYG – Rodney Hampton – 7 rushes, 12 yards
- SF – Ricky Watters – 24 rushes, 118 yards, 5 TD

Top receivers

- NYG – Ed McCaffrey – 5 receptions, 59 yards
- SF – John Taylor – 2 receptions, 74 yards

49ers running back Ricky Watters rushed for 118 yards, caught five passes for 46 yards, and scored an NFL playoff record five touchdowns as San Francisco crushed the Giants, 44–3. The 49ers racked up 413 yards of offense, with an average of 6.4 yards per play, while holding the Giants to just 194 yards, 4 sacks, and forcing three turnovers.

San Francisco started off the game with an 80-yard drive in which Steve Young completed his first four passes, including a 31-yard completion to John Taylor on the way to a 1-yard touchdown run by Watters. Kicker Mike Cofer missed the extra point, but little else would go wrong for San Francisco for the rest of the game. Following a Giants punt, San Francisco went up 9–0 on Cofer's 29-yard field goal. Then linebacker Bill Romanowski deflected a Simms pass into the arms of Tim McDonald, who returned the ball four yards to the Giants 41. Eight plays later, Watters scored another 1-yard touchdown run to give the 49ers a 16–0 lead. After another New York punt, San Francisco drove 92 yards, featuring a 43-yard reception by Taylor, to score on Watters' third touchdown of the day, this one from two yards out. New York eventually cut the score to 23–3 at halftime with a 25-yard field goal from kicker David Treadwell after they stopped the 49ers on fourth and 1 on their own 21-yard line, but this would be their only score.

Watters added two more touchdowns in the second half. He actually had a chance to score a sixth touchdown, but he was taken out of the game early in the fourth quarter with the ball on the Giants 11-yard line. Instead, he got to sit on the bench as Marc Logan scored the 49ers final points on a 2-yard run.

"There was no question who was the best team out there today", said Giants coach Dan Reeves. "I'm disappointed that we came in and played this way. It hurts; it leaves a bad taste in your mouth. The 49ers took us out of our element very quickly. They struck quickly and repeatedly, and took the running game away from us."

Although he didn't throw any touchdown passes, Young was near-perfect in the game, completing 17 of 22 passes for 226 yards, and rushing for 17 yards on the ground.

This was also the final game for Giants legends Lawrence Taylor and Phil Simms. The Giants would retire both of their numbers by 1995.

This was the sixth postseason meeting between the Giants and 49ers. New York won three of the previous five meetings.

Previous playoff games
New York leads 3–2 in all-time playoff games

1981

New York Giants 24 @ San Francisco 49ers 38

1981 NFC Divisional playoffs

1984

New York Giants 10 @ San Francisco 49ers 21

1984 NFC Divisional playoffs

1985

San Francisco 49ers 3 @ New York Giants 17

1985 NFC Wild Card playoffs

1986

San Francisco 49ers 3 @ New York Giants 49

1986 NFC Divisional playoffs

1990

New York Giants 15 @ San Francisco 49ers 13

1990 NFC Championship Game

=== Sunday, January 16, 1994 ===
==== NFC: Dallas Cowboys 27, Green Bay Packers 17 ====
Green Bay Packers vs. Dallas Cowboys – Game summary

Quarter	1	2	3	4	Total
Packers	3	0	7	7	17
Cowboys	0	17	7	3	27

at Texas Stadium, Irving, Texas

- Game time: 12:30 p.m. EST/11:30 a.m. CST
- Game weather: 50 °F (10 °C), cloudy
- Game attendance: 64,790
- Referee: Dick Hantak
- TV announcers (CBS): Jim Nantz (play-by-play) and Randy Cross (color commentator)

Game information

First quarter

- GB – Chris Jacke 30-yard field goal. Packers 3–0.
- DAL – Alvin Harper 25-yard pass from Troy Aikman (Eddie Murray kick). Cowboys 7–3.

Second quarter

- DAL – Eddie Murray 41-yard field goal. Cowboys 10–3.
- DAL – Jay Novacek 6-yard pass from Troy Aikman (Eddie Murray kick). Cowboys 17–3.
- DAL – Michael Irvin 19-yard pass from Troy Aikman (Eddie Murray kick). Cowboys 24–3.

Third quarter

- GB – Robert Brooks 13-yard pass from Brett Favre (Chris Jacke kick). Cowboys 24–10.
- DAL – Eddie Murray 38-yard field goal. Cowboys 27–10.

Fourth quarter

- GB – Sterling Sharpe 29-yard pass from Brett Favre (Chris Jacke kick). Cowboys 27–17.

Top passers

- GB – Brett Favre – 28/45, 331 yards, 2 TD, 2 INT
- DAL – Troy Aikman – 28/37, 302 yards, 3 TD, 2 INT

Top rushers

- GB – Darrell Thompson – 7 rushes, 28 yards
- DAL – Emmitt Smith – 13 rushes, 60 yards

Top receivers

- GB – Sterling Sharpe – 6 receptions, 128 yards, TD
- DAL – Michael Irvin – 9 receptions, 126 yards, TD

The Cowboys broke the game open by scoring 10 points in the final 23 seconds of the first half, and held on for the win by intercepting two passes in the fourth quarter.

Green Bay got an early chance to score when LeRoy Butler recovered a fumble from Dallas running back Emmitt Smith on the Cowboys 43-yard line. But on the next play, Packers quarterback Brett Favre lost a fumble while being sacked by Tony Tolbert that was recovered by Dallas defensive tackle Leon Lett. Later, the Packers got the ball on the Cowboys 28-yard line by stopping them on a fake punt attempt, leading to Chris Jacke's 30-yard field goal that gave them a 3–0 lead.

In the second quarter, Dallas quarterback Troy Aikman completed four consecutive passes on a 65-yard drive, the last a 25-yard touchdown to wide receiver Alvin Harper. Green Bay returner Corey Harris fumbled the ensuing kickoff out of bounds at his own 4-yard line. Green Bay still managed to drive to the Cowboys 31-yard line, with Favre completing a 48-yard pass to Sterling Sharpe on the way, but the drive ended there and Jacke hit the uprights on a field goal attempt from 49 yards. Dallas took over and stormed back on a 10-play, 45-yard drive, with Aikman's 22-yard completion to Smith and two more to Michael Irvin for 24 total yards. With 23 seconds left in the first half, Cowboys kicker Eddie Murray made a 41-yard field goal. On the ensuing kickoff, Dallas' Joe Fishback recovered Harris' second fumble of the day, this one forced by Kenneth Gant, and Aikman threw a 6-yard touchdown toss to tight end Jay Novacek, making the score 17–3 at halftime.

In the third quarter, Green Bay got a chance to come back when Terrell Buckley intercepted a pass from Aikman on the Packers 40-yard line. Green Bay then drove to the Cowboys 37, but on fourth down and 8, Favre's pass to tight end Ed West netted just six yards. Dallas took the ball back and stormed 65 yards in six plays, including an 18-yard catch by Irvin with a 15-yard face-mask penalty turning it into a 33-yard gain. On the last play, Irvin caught a 19-yard touchdown reception. Now down by 21 points, Green Bay countered with a 9-play, 82-yard drive, with Favre completing four consecutive passes, including a 30-yard gain to running back Darrell Thompson, and scoring on a 13-yard pass to Robert Brooks, cutting their deficit to 24–10 going into the fourth quarter.

In the final quarter, Green Bay lost multiple chances to get back into the game. First, Brooks' 43-yard punt return was nullified when Jim Jeffcoat deflected Favre's pass into the arms of defensive end Charles Haley on the next play. Dallas then drove 47 yards, including a 27-yard reception by Irvin, to score on Murray's 38-yard field goal and increase their lead to 27–10. The Packers responded with a drive from their 15 to the Dallas 15, but any hope of a miracle comeback was dashed on the 13th play when safety Darren Woodson ended the drive with an interception. In the last two minutes of the game, Green Bay scored on Favre's 29-yard touchdown throw to Sharpe, but by then the game was well out of reach.

Favre finished the game with 331 passing yards, just one yard short of a Packers playoff record, and two touchdowns, but was picked off twice. His top target was Sharpe, who caught six passes for 128 yards. Aikman completed 28 of 37 passes for 302 yards, three touchdowns, and two interceptions, while Irvin recorded nine receptions for 126 yards. Butler had a sack, an interception, and a fumble recovery.

This was the fourth postseason meeting between the Packers and Cowboys. Green Bay won two of the previous three meetings.

Previous playoff games
Green Bay leads 2–1 in all-time playoff games

1966

Green Bay Packers 34 @ Dallas Cowboys 27

1966 NFL Championship Game

1967

Dallas Cowboys 17 @ Green Bay Packers 21

1967 NFL Championship Game

1982

Green Bay Packers 26 @ Dallas Cowboys 37

1982 NFC Second Round playoffs

==== AFC: Kansas City Chiefs 28, Houston Oilers 20 ====
Kansas City Chiefs vs. Houston Oilers – Game summary

Quarter	1	2	3	4	Total
Chiefs	0	0	7	21	28
Oilers	10	0	0	10	20

at Astrodome, Houston, Texas

- Game time: 4:00 p.m. EST/3:00 p.m. CST
- Game weather: Played indoors, domed stadium
- Game attendance: 64,011
- Referee: Gerald Austin
- TV announcers (NBC): Dick Enberg (play-by-play) and Bob Trumpy (color commentator)
- Box score

Game information

First quarter

- HOU – Al Del Greco 49-yard field goal. Oilers 3–0.
- HOU – Gary Brown 2-yard run (Al Del Greco kick). Oilers 10–0.

Second quarter

- No scoring plays

Third quarter

- KC – Keith Cash 7-yard pass from Joe Montana (Nick Lowery kick). Oilers 10–7.

Fourth quarter

- HOU – Al Del Greco 43-yard field goal. Oilers 13–7.
- KC – J. J. Birden 11-yard pass from Joe Montana (Nick Lowery kick). Chiefs 14–13.
- KC – Willie Davis 18-yard pass from Joe Montana (Nick Lowery kick). Chiefs 21–13.
- HOU – Ernest Givens 7-yard pass from Warren Moon (Al Del Greco kick). Chiefs 21–20.
- KC – Marcus Allen 21-yard run (Nick Lowery kick). Chiefs 28–20.

Top passers

- KC – Joe Montana – 22/38, 299 yards, 3 TD, 2 INT
- HOU – Warren Moon – 32/43, 306 yards, TD, INT

Top rushers

- KC – Marcus Allen – 14 rushes, 74 yards, TD
- HOU – Gary Brown – 11 rushes, 17 yards, TD

Top receivers

- KC – Willie Davis – 5 receptions, 96 yards, TD
- HOU – Haywood Jeffires – 9 receptions, 88 yards

Chiefs quarterback Joe Montana threw three touchdown passes in the second half to give his team a 28–20 win and put an end to Houston's 11-game winning streak, while Kansas City's defense terrorized Houston quarterback Warren Moon, forcing three turnovers and sacking him a playoff record nine times. Four different Chiefs defensive players (Albert Lewis, Joe Phillips, Bennie Thompson, and Derrick Thomas) finished the game with multiple sacks, three of whom (all except Thomas) didn't have two sacks during the entire season.

On the opening drive of the game, a heavy pass rush by Oilers defensive tackle Glenn Montgomery caused Montana to throw a rushed pass that was intercepted by Steve Jackson, who returned it 14 yards to the Chiefs 23-yard line. Houston went three-and-out, including Lewis' 9-yard sack of Moon on third down, but Al Del Greco kicked a 49-yard field goal to put them on the board. Then after forcing a punt, Moon led the Oilers 80 yards in 11 plays on a drive that consumed just 6:37, starting if off with a 16-yard completion to Gary Wellman and later completing a 30-yard pass to Wellman deep in Chiefs territory. Once inside the red zone, Moon threw an incompletion on third down, but Thomas was penalized for being offsides, and Moon threw a first down completion to Haywood Jeffires at the 2-yard line on the next play. Running back Gary Brown took the ball into the end zone from there, increasing Houston's lead to 10–0.

In the second quarter, Chiefs receiver Danan Hughes gave his team a big opportunity by returning a punt 35 yards to the Oilers 42-yard line. But Kansas City ended up empty handed at the end of a drive in which they squandered multiple chances to get into scoring range. First, Montana threw a pass to the end zone that was barely deflected away from receiver Willie Davis by the outstretched arm of cornerback Cris Dishman. On the next play, he completed a pass to J. J. Birden that moved the ball to the 5-yard line, only to see it wiped out by a false start penalty on John Alt. Then after a screen pass that gained nothing, Montana threw another pass to the end zone on third down, this one bouncing off the fingertips of a wide open Davis and forcing Kansas City to punt. Houston then drove to the Chiefs 10-yard line on a drive that included Moon's 16-yard scramble with an unnecessary roughness penalty turning it into a 31-yard gain. But after a penalty pushed them back to the 25, they too failed to score when Lewis knocked the ball out of Moon's hand as he pulled it back to throw and rookie linebacker Jaime Fields recovered the fumble. Montana completed a 22-yard pass to Davis on the first play after the turnover, and eventually the Chiefs reached the Houston 36-yard line. But Montana threw an incomplete pass on fourth and 1, and the score remained 10–0 at the end of the half.

After forcing the Oilers to punt on the opening drive of the second half, Montana completed a 37-yard pass to Davis and a 14-yarder to Tim Barnett before finishing the drive with a 7-yard touchdown pass to tight end Keith Cash. Later in the quarter, Houston drove to the 48-yard line. But shortly before the end of the quarter, Charles Mincy made a clutch interception and returned the ball 12 yards to the Kansas City 14.

In the fourth quarter, Terry Hoage intercepted a pass from Montana at the Chiefs 25-yard line, setting up Del Greco's 43-yard field goal to make the score 13–7. But Kansas City quickly stormed back to take their first lead of the game, scoring in just three plays: a 22-yard completion from Montana to Cash, a 38-yard pass interference penalty against Houston, and Montana's 11-yard touchdown pass to Birden. Then on the first play of Houston's ensuing drive, Thomas forced a fumble from Moon that Dan Saleaumua recovered on the Oilers 13-yard line, setting up Montana's 18-yard touchdown pass to Davis. Moon then led the Oilers 80 yards with eight consecutive completions, including a 23-yard catch by Jeffires, to score on wide receiver Ernest Givins' 7-yard touchdown reception, making the score 21–20 with 3:35 left. But the Chiefs responded with a critical 41-yard completion from Montana to Cash on third and 1, setting up Marcus Allen's game clinching 21-yard touchdown run.

Houston would not host another playoff game until 2011 and the franchise would not appear in the playoffs until 1999, their first season as the Tennessee Titans. This would be the Chiefs' last postseason victory until January 9, 2016, when they defeated the Houston Texans. This was Montana's 10th consecutive postseason game with a touchdown pass, tying the NFL record set by Ken Stabler. Montana threw for 299 yards and three touchdowns, with two interceptions. Moon completed 32 of 43 passes for 302 yards and a touchdown, with one interception. Davis was the top receiver of the day with five receptions for 96 yards, while Jeffires caught nine passes for 88.

This was the second postseason meeting between the Chiefs and Oilers. The Chiefs won the only prior meeting as the Dallas Texans.

Previous playoff games
Kansas City/ Dallas Texans leads 1–0 in all-time playoff games

1962

Dallas Texans 20 @ Houston Oilers 17 (2OT)

1962 AFL Championship Game

== Conference championships ==
=== Sunday, January 23, 1994 ===
==== AFC: Buffalo Bills 30, Kansas City Chiefs 13 ====
Kansas City Chiefs vs. Buffalo Bills – Game summary

Quarter	1	2	3	4	Total
Chiefs	6	0	7	0	13
Bills	7	13	0	10	30

at Rich Stadium, Orchard Park, New York

- Game time: 12:30 p.m. EST
- Game weather: 36 °F (2 °C), cloudy
- Game attendance: 76,642
- Referee: Johnny Grier
- TV announcers (NBC): Dick Enberg (play-by-play) and Bob Trumpy (color commentator)
- Recap, Game Book

Game information

First quarter

- BUF – Thurman Thomas 12-yard run (Steve Christie kick). Bills 7–0.
- KC – Nick Lowery 31-yard field goal. Bills 7–3.
- KC – Nick Lowery 31-yard field goal. Bills 7–6.

Second quarter

- BUF – Thurman Thomas 3-yard run (Steve Christie kick). Bills 14–6.
- BUF – Steve Christie 23-yard field goal. Bills 17–6.
- BUF – Steve Christie 25-yard field goal. Bills 20–6.

Third quarter

- KC – Marcus Allen 1-yard run (Nick Lowery kick). Bills 20–13.

Fourth quarter

- BUF – Steve Christie 18-yard field goal. Bills 23–13.
- BUF – Thurman Thomas 3-yard run (Steve Christie kick). Bills 30–13.

Top passers

- KC – Dave Krieg – 16/29, 198 yards, INT
- BUF – Jim Kelly – 17/27, 160 yards

Top rushers

- KC – Marcus Allen – 18 rushes, 50 yards, TD
- BUF – Thurman Thomas – 33 rushes, 186 yards, 3 TD

Top receivers

- KC – Keith Cash – 6 receptions, 87 yards
- BUF – Andre Reed – 4 receptions, 49 yards

Running back Thurman Thomas led the Bills to the 30–13 victory by recording 186 rushing yards, three receptions for 22 yards, and three touchdowns. Buffalo racked up a total of 229 rushing yards against a Chiefs defense that allowed only 39 rushing yards from Houston in the divisional round.

Buffalo scored first on a drive that started on the Kansas City 47-yard line courtesy of Russell Copeland's 13-yard punt return. A few plays later, Andre Reed's 29-yard reception on third and 5 moved the ball to the 13-yard line, setting up Thurman Thomas' 12-yard touchdown run to give them a 7–0 lead. Building on the momentum of a 31-yard kickoff return by John Stephens and a 24-yard run by Marcus Allen, Kansas City responded with a 31-yard field goal by Nick Lowery. Then Kansas City caught a break when Copeland fumbled the ensuing kickoff while being hit by Bennie Thompson, and Fred Jones recovered for the Chiefs on the Bills 24-yard line. This led to Lowery's second field goal to make the score 7–6.

The Bills stormed back with 13 unanswered points. First they drove 80 yards in nine plays, including a 33-yard burst by Thomas and a 15-yard run by Kenneth Davis, to score on Thomas' 3-yard touchdown run. Then a third down sack by Jeff Wright forced a Kansas City punt from deep in their own territory, which Copeland returned 17 yards to the Chiefs 46-yard line. Buffalo subsequently drove to the 5-yard line where Steve Christie made a 23-yard field goal. After a Kansas City punt, a pair of double digit runs by Thomas set up a second Christie field goal to make the score 20–6 with just over two minutes left in the half. The Chiefs responded with a drive to the Buffalo 5-yard line, featuring a 31-yard completion from Joe Montana to running back Todd McNair, but with 21 seconds left before halftime, Montana's pass went through the hands of Kimble Anders and was intercepted by safety Henry Jones.

Montana later suffered a concussion during the third play of the third quarter and left the game, replaced by Dave Krieg. Krieg's first two passes were incomplete, resulting in a punt that Copeland returned 26 yards into KC territory, but the Chiefs defense rose to the occasion and forced a punt. Krieg then led his team on a 90-yard drive, starting out with a 26-yard completion to J. J. Birden and later completing a 19-yarder to tight end Keith Cash on fourth down and 2, to score on a 1-yard touchdown run by Allen. However, Buffalo scored 10 unanswered points in the final quarter to preserve the victory. First they responded to the Chiefs touchdown with an 18-yard field goal by Christie. Then a sack by Phil Hansen forced Kansas City to punt, and Copeland again gave his team good field position with a return to the Bills 48-yard line, where the team started a 52-yard drive to put the game away on Thomas' 3-yard touchdown run.

For the Bills, this was the third straight year they defeated a future Hall of Fame quarterback to advance to the Super Bowl. They beat John Elway and his Denver Broncos in the 1991 AFC Championship Game and Dan Marino and his Miami Dolphins in 1992. For Montana, this was his seventh start in a conference championship game, the most of any quarterback, breaking his tie with Terry Bradshaw and Roger Staubach. (In 2013, Tom Brady surpassed Montana by starting in his eighth AFC Championship Game.) He also joined the select group to start in the conference championship for two different franchises, joining Craig Morton (Cowboys and Broncos), Doug Williams (Buccaneers and Redskins) and Jay Schroeder (Redskins and Raiders). This was also Kelly's fifth conference championship game which is tied for fifth most with Ken Stabler, Elway, Brett Favre and Donovan McNabb. Copeland finished with 138 all-purpose yards, including five punt returns for 70.

It was the first AFC Championship Game that was a rematch of a previous AFL Championship Game, the former taking place in 1966.

This was the third postseason meeting between the Chiefs and Bills. The teams split the prior two meetings.

Previous playoff games
Tied 1–1 in all-time playoff games

1966

Kansas City Chiefs 31 @ Buffalo Bills 7

1966 AFL Championship Game

1991

Kansas City Chiefs 14 @ Buffalo Bills 37

1991 AFC Divisional playoffs

==== NFC: Dallas Cowboys 38, San Francisco 49ers 21 ====
San Francisco 49ers vs. Dallas Cowboys – Game summary

Quarter	1	2	3	4	Total
49ers	0	7	7	7	21
Cowboys	7	21	7	3	38

at Texas Stadium, Irving, Texas

- Game time: 4:00 p.m. EST/3:00 p.m. CST
- Game weather: 55 °F (13 °C), cloudy
- Game attendance: 64,902
- Referee: Jerry Markbreit
- TV announcers (CBS): Pat Summerall (play-by-play) and John Madden (color commentator)

Game information

First quarter

- DAL – Emmitt Smith 5-yard run (Eddie Murray kick). Cowboys 7–0.

Second quarter

- SF – Tom Rathman 7-yard pass from Steve Young (Mike Cofer kick). Tied 7–7.
- DAL – Daryl Johnston 4-yard run (Eddie Murray kick). Cowboys 14–7.
- DAL – Emmitt Smith 11-yard pass from Troy Aikman (Eddie Murray kick). Cowboys 21–7.
- DAL – Jay Novacek 19-yard pass from Troy Aikman (Eddie Murray kick). Cowboys 28–7.

Third quarter

- SF – Ricky Watters 4-yard run (Mike Cofer kick). Cowboys 28–14.
- DAL – Alvin Harper 42-yard pass from Bernie Kosar (Eddie Murray kick). Cowboys 35–14.

Fourth quarter

- DAL – Eddie Murray 50-yard field goal. Cowboys 38–14.
- SF – Steve Young 1-yard run (Mike Cofer kick). Cowboys 38–21.

Top passers

- SF – Steve Young – 27/45, 287 yards, TD, INT
- DAL – Troy Aikman – 14/18, 177 yards, 2 TD

Top rushers

- SF – Ricky Watters – 12 rushes, 37 yards, TD
- DAL – Emmitt Smith – 23 rushes, 88 yards, TD

Top receivers

- SF – Jerry Rice – 6 receptions, 83 yards
- DAL – Emmitt Smith – 7 receptions, 85 yards, TD

Three days before the game, Dallas coach Jimmy Johnson famously guaranteed that his team would win, and his team did not disappoint. The Cowboys jumped to a 28–7 halftime lead, racking up 273 yards and 19 first downs, and scoring four touchdowns in their first five possessions. San Francisco finished the half with just 110 total yards and six first downs.

Dallas took the opening kickoff and marched 75 yards in 11 plays to score on running back Emmitt Smith's 5-yard touchdown. Five seconds into the second quarter, the 49ers finished a 9-play, 80-yard drive and tied the game on quarterback Steve Young's 7-yard touchdown pass to fullback Tom Rathman. But then the Cowboys scored three unanswered touchdowns to go up 28–7 before halftime. First they drove 80 yards in 11 plays to score on a 4-yard run by fullback Daryl Johnston. Then Thomas Everett intercepted a pass from Young, batted up in the air by John Taylor trying to make the catch, and returned it 14 yards to the 49ers 24 to set up Smith's 11-yard touchdown reception from Troy Aikman. Five minutes later, Aikman finished a 72-yard drive with a 19-yard score to tight end Jay Novacek.

On Dallas' first series of the third quarter, Aikman suffered a game-ending concussion, knocking him so senseless that when a team doctor asked him where the Super Bowl was going to be played, he answered "Henryetta", Aikman's hometown in Oklahoma. Then with just over five minutes left in the third quarter, San Francisco running back Ricky Watters ran for a 4-yard touchdown to cut the lead to 28–14. However, 30-year-old Dallas backup quarterback Bernie Kosar responded by leading the Cowboys 82 yards to a momentum-shattering touchdown, including a critical 12-yard completion to Michael Irvin on third and 9 from the Dallas 19. On the last play, he connected with wide receiver Alvin Harper for a 42-yard touchdown. Cowboys kicker Eddie Murray later added a 50-yard field goal in the fourth quarter to clinch the victory.

Mostly due to Johnson's famous guarantee, ESPN named the game one of the 10 most memorable in the history of Texas Stadium in 2008. "I don't think anybody in a million years thought it would be this type of game", said 49ers coach George Seifert. "I expected us to be more stout. In the early stages of the game, Dallas was extremely explosive and pretty much had their way with us."

This would be CBS's final NFL telecast (due to their losing the NFC package to Fox in December 1993) before resuming coverage in 1998. CBS used a goodbye montage featuring the instrumental background "After the Sunrise" composed by Yanni.

Dallas had 377 yards of offense without any turnovers. Aikman completed 14 of 18 passes for 177 yards and two touchdowns, while Kosar completed five of nine passes for 83 yards and a score. Smith was the Cowboys leading rusher and receiver with 88 rushing yards and seven receptions for 85 yards. Young threw for 287 yards, a touchdown, and an interception, while also rushing for 38 yards and a score. Watters, who rushed for over 100 yards and scored five touchdowns in the divisional round, had just 12 carries for 37 yards. This was the first NFC Championship Game featuring a rematch between both teams from the previous year since the 1971 season. Incidentally, that game also involved the Cowboys defeating the 49ers for the second year in a row.

Aikman later said he had no memory of playing in this game. According to his agent, Leigh Steinberg, who spoke to Aikman at the hospital after the game, Aikman had to ask him where he was, why he was at the hospital, who he had been playing against, and if his team had won. Despite this, Aikman still returned to lead the Cowboys to victory in the Super Bowl just one week later.

This was the sixth postseason meeting between the 49ers and Cowboys. Dallas won four of the previous five meetings.

Previous playoff games
Dallas leads 4–1 in all-time playoff games

1970

Dallas Cowboys 17 @ San Francisco 49ers 10

1970 NFC Championship Game

1971

San Francisco 49ers 3 @ Dallas Cowboys 14

1971 NFC Championship Game

1972

Dallas Cowboys 30 @ San Francisco 49ers 28

1972 NFC Divisional playoffs

1981

Dallas Cowboys 27 @ San Francisco 49ers 28

1981 NFC Championship Game

1992

Dallas Cowboys 30 @ San Francisco 49ers 20

1992 NFC Championship Game

== Super Bowl XXVIII: Dallas Cowboys 30, Buffalo Bills 13 ==
Super Bowl XXVIII – Dallas Cowboys vs. Buffalo Bills – Game summary

Quarter	1	2	3	4	Total
Cowboys (NFC)	6	0	14	10	30
Bills (AFC)	3	10	0	0	13

at Georgia Dome, Atlanta, Georgia

- Date: January 30, 1994
- Game attendance: 72,817
- Referee: Bob McElwee
- TV announcers (NBC): Dick Enberg (play-by-play) and Bob Trumpy (color commentator)

This was the second consecutive Super Bowl meeting between the Cowboys and Bills. There has yet to be another Super Bowl matchup to occur in consecutive years as of the 2023 NFL season.

Previous playoff games
Dallas leads 1–0 in all-time playoff games

1992

Buffalo Bills 17 vs. Dallas Cowboys 52

Super Bowl XXVII
