= List of most watched United States television broadcasts of 1994 =

The following is a list of most watched United States television broadcasts of 1994.

== Most watched by week ==
Broadcast (primetime only)
Week of	Title	Network	Viewers (in millions)	Ref.
January 3	Home Improvement	ABC	39.1	
January 10	Chiefs vs. Oilers (NFL)	NBC	48.5	
January 17	NFC Championship post-game show	CBS	39.6	
January 24	Super Bowl XXVIII	NBC	90.0	
January 31	Home Improvement	ABC	39.3	
February 7	1994 Winter Olympics (Sun)	CBS	45.9	
February 14	Unknown			
February 21	1994 Winter Olympics (Wed)	CBS	78.7	
February 28	Roseanne	ABC	31.8	
March 7	Home Improvement	ABC	44.0	
March 14	Home Improvement	ABC	38.9	
March 21	66th Academy Awards	ABC	45.1	
March 28	Home Improvement	ABC	39.9	
April 4	Home Improvement	ABC	37.7	
April 11	Home Improvement	ABC	36.4	
April 18	Home Improvement	ABC	31.8	
April 25	Seinfeld	NBC	29.6	
May 2	Home Improvement	ABC	34.4	
May 9	The Stand, Part 2	ABC	33.1	
May 16	Seinfeld	NBC	30.1	
May 23	Roseanne	ABC	28.1	
May 30	Home Improvement	ABC	28.6	
June 6	Home Improvement	ABC	24.9	
June 13	Home Improvement	ABC	27.0	
June 20	NBA Finals (Game 7)	NBC	26.1	
June 27	Home Improvement	ABC	26.0	
July 4	Home Improvement	ABC	24.9	
July 11	Home Improvement	ABC	24.4	
July 18	Home Improvement	ABC	26.0	
July 25	Home Improvement	ABC	26.2	
August 1	Grace Under Fire	ABC	22.1	
August 8	Home Improvement	ABC	27.7	
August 15	Home Improvement	ABC	26.6	
August 22	Home Improvement	ABC	27.1	
August 29	Home Improvement	ABC	28.4	
September 5	Home Improvement	ABC	29.9	
September 12	Home Improvement	ABC	29.8	
1994–95 television season begins
September 19	Home Improvement	ABC	36.1	
September 26	Home Improvement	ABC	35.0	
October 3	Home Improvement	ABC	33.5	
October 10	Home Improvement	ABC	34.2	
October 17	Home Improvement	ABC	33.2	
October 24	Home Improvement	ABC	37.0	
October 31	Home Improvement	ABC	33.7	
November 7	Home Improvement	ABC	29.6	
November 7	Seinfeld	NBC	29.6	
November 14	Seinfeld	NBC	32.4	
November 21	Unknown			
November 28	Home Improvement	ABC	32.0	
December 5	Home Improvement	ABC	36.4	
December 12	Home Improvement	ABC	35.6	
December 19	Home Improvement	ABC	31.8	
December 26	Monday Night Football	ABC	32.0	
