= 1991–92 NFL playoffs =

American football tournament

- Dates: December 28, 1991 – January 26, 1992
- Season: 1991
- Teams: 12
- Games played: 11
- Super Bowl XXVI site: Hubert H. Humphrey Metrodome; Minneapolis, Minnesota
- Defending champions: New York Giants (did not qualify)
- Champion: Washington Redskins (5th title)
- Runner-up: Buffalo Bills
- Conference runners-up: Denver Broncos; Detroit Lions
NFL playoffs
| ← 1990–91 | 1992–93 → |

The National Football League playoffs for the 1991 season began on December 28, 1991. The postseason tournament concluded with the Washington Redskins defeating the Buffalo Bills in Super Bowl XXVI, 37–24, on January 26, 1992, at the Hubert H. Humphrey Metrodome in Minneapolis, Minnesota.

This edition of the NFL playoffs marked the first time ever that every AFC playoff qualifier was an original AFL franchise. Previous postseasons had either featured pre-merger NFL teams (Steelers, Browns, Colts), AFL expansion teams (Dolphins, Bengals) and/or AFC expansion teams (Seahawks).

== Participants ==
Within each conference, the three division winners and the three non-division winners with the best overall regular season records qualified for the playoffs. The three division winners were seeded 1–3 based on the overall won-lost-tied record, and the three wild card teams were seeded 4–6. The NFL did not use a fixed bracket playoff system, and there were no restrictions regarding teams from the same division matching up in any round. In the first round, dubbed the wild-card playoffs or wild-card weekend, the third-seeded division winner hosted the sixth seed wild card, and the fourth seed hosted the fifth. The 1 and 2 seeds from each conference received a first-round bye. In the second round, the divisional playoffs, the number 1 seed hosted the worst-remaining seed from the first round (seed 4, 5, or 6), while the number 2 seed played the other team (seed 3, 4, or 5). The two winning teams from each conference's divisional playoff games then meet in the respective AFC and NFC Conference Championship games, hosted by the higher seed. Although the Super Bowl, the championship round of the playoffs, was played at a neutral site, the designated home team was based on an annual rotation by conference.

Playoff seeds
| Seed | AFC | NFC |
|---|---|---|
| 1 | Buffalo Bills (East winner) | Washington Redskins (East winner) |
| 2 | Denver Broncos (West winner) | Detroit Lions (Central winner) |
| 3 | Houston Oilers (Central winner) | New Orleans Saints (West winner) |
| 4 | Kansas City Chiefs (wild card) | Chicago Bears (wild card) |
| 5 | Los Angeles Raiders (wild card) | Dallas Cowboys (wild card) |
| 6 | New York Jets (wild card) | Atlanta Falcons (wild card) |

== Bracket ==
Dec 29 – Soldier Field | Jan 5 – Pontiac Silverdome
5 | Dallas | 17
5 | Dallas | 6
4 | Chicago | 13 | Jan 12 – RFK Stadium
2 | Detroit | 38
NFC
Dec 28 – Louisiana Superdome | 2 | Detroit | 10
Jan 4 – RFK Stadium
1 | Washington | 41
6 | Atlanta | 27 | NFC Championship
6 | Atlanta | 7
3 | New Orleans | 20 | Jan 26 – Hubert H. Humphrey Metrodome
1 | Washington | 24
Wild-card round
Divisional round
Dec 29 – Astrodome | N1 | Washington | 37
Jan 4 – Mile High Stadium
A1 | Buffalo | 24
6 | NY Jets | 10 | Super Bowl XXVI
3 | Houston | 24
3 | Houston | 17 | Jan 12 – Rich Stadium
2 | Denver | 26
AFC
Dec 28 – Arrowhead Stadium | 2 | Denver | 7
Jan 5 – Rich Stadium
1 | Buffalo | 10
5 | LA Raiders | 6 | AFC Championship
4 | Kansas City | 14
4 | Kansas City | 10
1 | Buffalo | 37

== Schedule ==
In the United States, ABC broadcast the first two Wild Card playoff games, then NBC broadcast the rest of the AFC playoff games. CBS televised the rest of the NFC games.

Super Bowl XXVI was the last Super Bowl to air on CBS until Super Bowl XXXV (Super Bowl XXVI was originally scheduled to air on NBC, with CBS scheduled to air Super Bowl XXVII, but the networks swapped games) at the end of the 2000–01 playoffs. CBS lost the NFC package to Fox following the 1993 season, leaving the network without the NFL until it acquired the AFC package from NBC for the 1998 season.

| Round | Away team | Score | Home team | Date | Kickoff (ET / UTC−5) | TV |
|---|---|---|---|---|---|---|
| Wild-card round | Los Angeles Raiders | 6–10 | Kansas City Chiefs | December 28, 1991 | 12:30 p.m. | ABC |
| Wild-card round | Atlanta Falcons | 27–20 | New Orleans Saints | December 28, 1991 | 4:00 p.m. | ABC |
| Wild-card round | Dallas Cowboys | 17–13 | Chicago Bears | December 29, 1991 | 12:30 p.m. | CBS |
| Wild-card round | New York Jets | 10–17 | Houston Oilers | December 29, 1991 | 4:00 p.m. | NBC |
| Divisional round | Atlanta Falcons | 7–24 | Washington Redskins | January 4, 1992 | 12:30 p.m. | CBS |
| Divisional round | Houston Oilers | 24–26 | Denver Broncos | January 4, 1992 | 4:00 p.m. | NBC |
| Divisional round | Kansas City Chiefs | 14–37 | Buffalo Bills | January 5, 1992 | 12:30 p.m. | NBC |
| Divisional round | Dallas Cowboys | 6–38 | Detroit Lions | January 5, 1992 | 4:00 p.m. | CBS |
| Conference championships | Denver Broncos | 7–10 | Buffalo Bills | January 12, 1992 | 12:30 p.m. | NBC |
| Conference championships | Detroit Lions | 10–41 | Washington Redskins | January 12, 1992 | 4:00 p.m. | CBS |
| Super Bowl XXVI Hubert H. Humphrey Metrodome Minneapolis, Minnesota | Washington Redskins | 37–24 | Buffalo Bills | January 26, 1992 | 6:25 p.m. | CBS |

== Wild-card round ==
=== Saturday, December 28, 1991 ===
==== AFC: Kansas City Chiefs 10, Los Angeles Raiders 6 ====
Los Angeles Raiders vs. Kansas City Chiefs – Game summary

| Quarter | 1 | 2 | 3 | 4 | Total |
|---|---|---|---|---|---|
| Raiders | 0 | 3 | 3 | 0 | 6 |
| Chiefs | 0 | 7 | 0 | 3 | 10 |

at Arrowhead Stadium, Kansas City, Missouri

- Game time: 12:30 p.m. EST/11:30 a.m. CST
- Game weather: 38 °F (3 °C), partly cloudy
- Game attendance: 75,827
- Referee: Jerry Markbreit
- TV announcers (ABC): Brent Musburger (play-by-play) and Dick Vermeil (color commentator)
- Recap, Game Book

Game information

First quarter

- No scoring plays.

Second quarter

- KC – Fred Jones 11-yard pass from Steve DeBerg (Nick Lowery kick). Chiefs 7–0.
- RAI – Jeff Jaeger 32-yard field goal. Chiefs 7–3.

Third quarter

- RAI – Jeff Jaeger 26-yard field goal. Chiefs 7–6.

Fourth quarter

- KC – Nick Lowery 18-yard field goal. Chiefs 10–6.

Top passers

- RAI – Todd Marinovich – 12/23, 140 yards, 4 INT
- KC – Steve DeBerg – 9/14, 89 yards, TD, INT

Top rushers

- RAI – Nick Bell – 20 rushes, 107 yards
- KC – Barry Word – 33 rushes, 130 yards

Top receivers

- RAI – Ethan Horton – 3 receptions, 59 yards
- KC – Bill Jones – 2 receptions, 25 yards

Chiefs quarterback Steve DeBerg completed a play-action 11-yard touchdown pass to wide receiver Fred Jones in the second quarter, which was the difference in Kansas City's narrow 10–6 win over long-time rival Los Angeles. Kansas City running back Barry Word was arguably the Chiefs' most effective offensive weapon, rushing for 133 yards. This was Kansas City's first postseason win since Super Bowl IV in the 1969 season. The Raiders started rookie quarterback Todd Marinovich over veteran Jay Schroeder. Marinovich, who performed well in a loss to Kansas City the week before, instead threw four interceptions in the wild card rematch, including the one to Deron Cherry that set up DeBerg's touchdown. Kansas City's defense managed to hold Los Angeles to six points despite losing star linebacker Derrick Thomas, who was diagnosed with a rapid heartbeat and rushed to the hospital near the end of the first half.

The Chiefs controlled most of the first quarter, with Word rushing for 36 yards on 13 carries, but missed a chance to score when their normally reliable kicker Nick Lowery missed a 33-yard field goal. Marinovich promptly gave the Chiefs another scoring chance with an interception to Cherry, who returned the ball 17 yards. However, their ensuing drive ended with another missed field goal from Lowery, a 47-yard attempt early in the second quarter. On the Raiders' next drive, Cherry intercepted Marinovich again, this time returning the ball 29 yards to the LA 11-yard line. DeBerg then put Kansas City up 7–0 with an 11-yard touchdown pass to Jones. However, Marinovich finally managed to compose himself, putting together a 10-play, 65-yard drive that culminated with Jeff Jaeger's 33-yard field goal, cutting the deficit to 7–3 with 26 seconds left in the half.

Marinovich, who was rattled in the first half, found a rhythm in the second half, leading the team 62 yards in 11 plays with their first drive. Running back Nick Bell, who finished the game with 107 rushing yards, gained 46 yards on eight carries, while Jaeger finished the possession with a 26-yard field goal that made the score 7–6. Later in the quarter, LA appeared to be headed for a go-ahead score. But linebacker Lonnie Marts managed to force a fumble from Marcus Allen and defensive tackle Dan Saleaumua recovered the ball. Kansas City then drove 61 yards to the Raiders' 1-yard line where Lowery's 18-yard field goal in the fourth quarter put the Chiefs up 10–6.

Los Angeles responded with a drive to the Kansas City 25, but after linebacker Chris Martin sacked Marinovich for an 8-yard loss, Eric Everett intercepted the ball and returned it 23 yards. Still, the Raiders defense held firm, forcing a punt that gave their offense one last chance to drive for a game winning score. Marinovich's 28-yard completion to tight end Ethan Horton and an 8-yard completion to running back Steve Smith moved the ball to the Chiefs' 24-yard line. However, the team suddenly self-destructed in a barrage of penalties. Right tackle Steve Wright was flagged for a face mask and a false start on consecutive snaps, and then an offensive pass interference penalty on Tim Brown left the team facing first and 30 from their own 41. On the next play, Marinovich's pass bounced off the hands of Horton and was intercepted by Marts with 2:15 left in regulation, enabling Kansas City to run out the rest of the clock.

The game was also significant in that it featured what was at the time the oldest starting player in the NFL (DeBerg; age 38) and the second-youngest player to start at quarterback in a playoff game: Marniovich at age 22 (Cleveland's Bernie Kosar being the youngest).

"This is the first playoff game I have ever won", said DeBerg after the game. "I'm going to enjoy it and hopefully this won't be the last one I get to enjoy. Todd was in a tough situation. He made some plays. But in the playoffs, for a rookie to get the job done...it is very, very difficult."

This was the third postseason meeting between the Raiders and Chiefs. Both teams split the previous two meetings as members of the AFL.

Previous playoff games
Tied 1–1 in all-time playoff games

1968

Kansas City Chiefs 6 @ Oakland Raiders 41

1968 AFL Western Div. playoff

1969

Kansas City Chiefs 17 @ Oakland Raiders 7

1969 AFL Championship Game

==== NFC: Atlanta Falcons 27, New Orleans Saints 20 ====
Atlanta Falcons vs. New Orleans Saints – Game summary

| Quarter | 1 | 2 | 3 | 4 | Total |
|---|---|---|---|---|---|
| Falcons | 0 | 10 | 7 | 10 | 27 |
| Saints | 7 | 6 | 0 | 7 | 20 |

at Louisiana Superdome, New Orleans, Louisiana

- Game time: 4:00 p.m. EST/3:00 p.m. CST
- Game weather: Played indoors, domed stadium
- Game attendance: 68,794
- Referee: Howard Roe
- TV announcers (ABC): Al Michaels (play-by-play), Frank Gifford, and Dan Dierdorf (color commentators)

Game information

First quarter

- NO – Floyd Turner 26-yard pass from Bobby Hebert (Morten Andersen kick). Saints 7–0.

Second quarter

- NO – Morten Andersen 45-yard field goal. Saints 10–0.
- ATL – Andre Rison 24-yard pass from Chris Miller (Norm Johnson kick). Saints 10–7.
- ATL – Norm Johnson 44-yard field goal. Tied 10–10.

Third quarter

- NO – Morten Andersen 35-yard field goal. Saints 13–10.
- ATL – Michael Haynes 20-yard pass from Chris Miller (Norm Johnson kick). Falcons 17–13.

Fourth quarter

- NO – Dalton Hilliard 1-yard run (Morten Andersen kick). Saints 20–17.
- ATL – Norm Johnson 36-yard field goal. Tied 20–20.
- ATL – Michael Haynes 61-yard pass from Chris Miller (Norm Johnson kick). Falcons 27–20.

Top passers

- ATL – Chris Miller – 18/30, 291 yards, 3 TD, INT
- NO – Bobby Hebert – 26/44, 273 yards, TD, 2 INT

Top rushers

- ATL – Mike Rozier – 7 rushes, 35 yards
- NO – Fred McAfee – 14 rushes, 49 yards

Top receivers

- ATL – Michael Haynes – 6 receptions, 144 yards, 2 TD
- NO – Eric Martin – 7 receptions, 83 yards

Falcons quarterback Chris Miller completed the game-winning 61-yard touchdown pass to wide receiver Michael Haynes with 2:41 left in the contest. Miller completed 18 out of 30 passes for 291 yards and three touchdowns.

The Saints scored first on a 78-yard drive in which they started with a punt after three plays, but kept the ball due to a roughing the punter penalty against Tracy Johnson. Quarterback Bobby Hebert completed five passes on the drive, the last a 26-yard touchdown to wide receiver Floyd Turner. On the Saints' next drive, they moved the ball all the way to the Falcons' 3-yard line. But tight end John Tice dropped a catchable pass and then Deion Sanders intercepted Hebert's pass in the end zone to avoid a facing a fourteen-point deficit. In the second quarter, Morten Andersen's 45-yard field goal gave the Saints a 10–0 lead.

The Falcons later got a huge break when an apparent fumble by Mike Rozier was ruled down on contact on the field and instant replay couldn't reverse it. On the next play, Miller threw a 24-yard touchdown pass to Andre Rison. With 37 seconds left in the half, Atlanta tied the game on Norm Johnson's 44-yard field goal. However, Saints running back Fred McAfee returned the ensuing kickoff 39 yards, with a facemask penalty against Sanders adding five more and giving New Orleans the ball on the Falcons' 41. On the next play, Hebert completed a 26-yard pass to running back Dalton Hilliard, enabling New Orleans to retake the lead before halftime, 13–10, on Andersen's 35-yard field goal.

Atlanta started off the second half with a 9-play, 80-yard drive to take their first lead of the game on Miller's 20-yard scoring pass to Haynes. The rest of the quarter would belong to the Saints, who consumed a franchise playoff record 10:49 by driving 80 yards in 19 plays and going back up 20–17 with a 1-yard touchdown run by Hilliard. New Orleans was aided by another key penalty against the Falcons defense, an offsides penalty against linebacker Jessie Tuggle on an Andersen field goal attempt that gave the Saints a first down. With 7:43 left in the game, Johnson kicked a field goal to tie the score at 20 at the end of a 45-yard drive. The next time they got the ball, Haynes took off past cornerback Milton Mack, caught a short slant from Miller, and raced 61 yards to the end zone, giving Atlanta a 27–20 lead. After Haynes scored the winning touchdown for the Falcons, the Saints reached the Atlanta 35-yard line before Hebert threw an interception to Falcons corner Tim McKyer to clinch the victory.

Haynes caught six passes for 144 yards and two touchdowns. McAfee rushed for 49 yards and returned four kickoffs for 98. Saints defensive tackle Frank Warren had two of New Orleans's five sacks.

This was the first postseason meeting between the Falcons and Saints.

=== Sunday, December 29, 1991 ===
==== NFC: Dallas Cowboys 17, Chicago Bears 13 ====
Dallas Cowboys vs. Chicago Bears – Game summary

| Quarter | 1 | 2 | 3 | 4 | Total |
|---|---|---|---|---|---|
| Cowboys | 10 | 0 | 7 | 0 | 17 |
| Bears | 0 | 3 | 3 | 7 | 13 |

at Soldier Field, Chicago, Illinois

- Game time: 12:30 p.m. EST/11:30 a.m. CST
- Game weather: 34 °F (1 °C), partly cloudy
- Game attendance: 62,594
- Referee: Dick Hantak
- TV announcers (CBS): Pat Summerall (play-by-play) and John Madden (color commentator)

Game information

First quarter

- DAL – Ken Willis 27-yard field goal. Cowboys 3–0.
- DAL – Emmitt Smith 1-yard run (Ken Willis kick). Cowboys 10–0.

Second quarter

- CHI – Kevin Butler 19-yard field goal. Cowboys 10–3.

Third quarter

- CHI – Kevin Butler 43-yard field goal. Cowboys 10–6.
- DAL – Jay Novacek 3-yard pass from Steve Beuerlein (Ken Willis kick). Cowboys 17–6.

Fourth quarter

- CHI – Tom Waddle 6-yard pass from Jim Harbaugh (Kevin Butler kick). Cowboys 17–13.

Top passers

- DAL – Steve Beuerlein – 9/18, 180 yards, TD
- CHI – Jim Harbaugh – 22/44, 218 yards, TD, 2 INT

Top rushers

- DAL – Emmitt Smith – 26 rushes, 105 yards, TD
- CHI – Darren Lewis – 9 rushes, 65 yards

Top receivers

- DAL – Alvin Harper – 3 receptions, 88 yards
- CHI – Tom Waddle – 9 receptions, 104 yards, TD

The Cowboys jumped to a 10–0 first quarter lead and held on to win their first playoff game in nine years. Although Chicago outgained the Cowboys in total yards 372–288 and first downs 26–15, Dallas forced three turnovers and three sacks, while giving up none of either on their side of the ball. They also forced two turnovers on downs inside their own 10-yard line.

Bill Bates set up the first score of the game by forcing a fumble from Bears quarterback Jim Harbaugh on the opening drive, which defensive end Tony Hill recovered at midfield, leading to Ken Willis's 27-yard field goal. Then Cowboys linebacker Darrick Brownlow blocked a punt that was recovered by linebacker Ken Norton Jr. at the Chicago 10-yard line, setting up a 1-yard touchdown by running back Emmitt Smith.

In the second quarter, Chicago moved the ball 68 yards to the Cowboys' 2-yard line. On third and 1, Harbaugh was stuffed for no gain by linebacker Jack Del Rio, and Neal Anderson was dropped by Tony Tolbert on the next play. This experience would be repeated later when Chicago drove 77 yards to the 2-yard line again, with rookie Darren Lewis rushing four times for 37 yards and catching a pass for 11. On second and goal, Norton tackled Anderson at the 1, and then he and Tolbert dropped Anderson for no gain on the next play. Rather than try another fourth-down conversion, Chicago settled for Kevin Butler's 19-yard field goal to make the score 10–3 with 15 seconds left in the half.

Butler narrowed the gap to 10–6 with a 43-yard field goal, but Dallas responded with a 75-yard, 14-play drive to go up 17–6 on Steve Beuerlein's 3-yard touchdown pass to tight end Jay Novacek. In the fourth quarter, the Bears drove to the Dallas 7-yard line, only to turn the ball over on downs with Harbaugh's fourth-down incompletion. Following a Cowboys punt, Chicago managed to score their first touchdown on Harbaugh's 6-yard touchdown pass to Tom Waddle, cutting the deficit to 17–13. Their defense then forced a three-and-out, giving Chicago a chance to drive for the winning touchdown. However, this was made difficult by Mike Saxon's 52-yard punt, which pinned the Bears back on their own 4-yard line with 1:50 left in regulation. Three plays later, Bates intercepted a pass from Harbaugh on the Bears' 16, enabling Dallas to run out the clock.

"We're on a mission to kind of make a name for ourselves", Dallas nose tackle Russell Maryland said. "People said a couple of years ago that our defense was like a three-ring circus out there. Now we're out to prove that we're the greatest show on earth." "We just don't get any credit", added safety Ray Horton, describing a defense that did not have any Pro Bowl selections. "We come up and do what we have to do. Hey, we've won 12 games! Other higher-ranked defenses are at home right now. So it's not like we're riding the coattails of our offense."

Smith finished the game with 105 rushing yards and a touchdown, the most rushing yards ever allowed by Chicago in a playoff game. Waddle caught nine passes for 104 yards and a score.

This was the second postseason meeting between the Cowboys and Bears. Dallas won the only prior meeting.

Previous playoff games
Dallas leads 1–0 in all-time playoff games

1977

Chicago Bears 7 @ Dallas Cowboys 37

1977 NFC Divisional playoffs

==== AFC: Houston Oilers 17, New York Jets 10 ====
New York Jets vs. Houston Oilers – Game summary

| Quarter | 1 | 2 | 3 | 4 | Total |
|---|---|---|---|---|---|
| Jets | 0 | 10 | 0 | 0 | 10 |
| Oilers | 7 | 7 | 0 | 3 | 17 |

at Astrodome, Houston, Texas

- Game time: 4:00 p.m. EST/3:00 p.m. CST
- Game weather: Played indoors, domed stadium
- Game attendance: 61,485
- Referee: Tom White
- TV announcers (NBC): Marv Albert (play-by-play) and Paul Maguire (color commentator)

Game information

First quarter

- HOU – Ernest Givins 5-yard pass from Warren Moon (Al Del Greco kick). Oilers 7–0.
- NYJ – Al Toon 10-yard pass from Ken O'Brien (Raúl Allegre kick). Tied 7–7.

Second quarter

- HOU – Ernest Givins 20-yard pass from Warren Moon (Al Del Greco kick). Oilers 14–7.
- NYJ – Raúl Allegre 33-yard field goal. Oilers 14–10.

Third quarter

- No scoring plays.

Fourth quarter

- HOU – Al Del Greco 53-yard field goal. Oilers 17–10.

Top passers

- NYJ – Ken O'Brien – 21/31, 221 yards, TD, 3 INT
- HOU – Warren Moon – 28/40, 271 yards, 2 TD, INT

Top rushers

- NYJ – Johnny Hector – 11 rushes, 43 yards
- HOU – Lorenzo White – 17 rushes, 65 yards

Top receivers

- NYJ – Al Toon – 8 receptions, 96 yards, TD
- HOU – Ernest Givins – 6 receptions, 83 yards, 2 TD

After leading 14–10 at halftime, the Oilers stopped the Jets twice inside the 5-yard line in the second half to preserve the victory.

Houston got the ball first and on their opening play, they lost three yards on a screen pass. Once that was done, quarterback Warren Moon got them rolling all the way to the end zone. Despite two fumbled snaps on the drive, he completed 8/10 passes for 64 yards, including a 24-yarder to Haywood Jeffires, on a 16-play, 80-yard drive that took 9:14 off the clock and ended with his 5-yard touchdown pass to receiver Ernest Givins. New York had to punt on their first possession, but got the ball back with great field position when Erik McMillan intercepted Moon's pass on the Oilers' 39-yard line. The Jets then cashed in on their opportunity with a 9-play drive to score on Ken O'Brien's 10-yard touchdown pass to Al Toon, who made an athletic catch in the back of the end zone while barely managing to keep his feet in bounds. Later on, Bo Orlando intercepted a long pass from O'Brien on the Oilers' 25, and Moon led the team to a touchdown from there, completing passes to Drew Hill and Givins for 20 and 35 yards before Givins's 20-yard touchdown reception made the score 14–7 with 3:56 left in the half. New York ended up punting, but at the 1:10 mark, Houston's Al Del Greco missed a 46-yard field goal wide right. O'Brien then completed a pair of passes to Toon for 36 total yards on a drive to the Oilers' 16-yard line where Raúl Allegre kicked a 33-yard field goal to cut the deficit to 14–10 going into halftime.

The Jets then took the opening kickoff of the second half and marched to the Houston 8-yard line, but O'Brien threw an interception to Bubba McDowell. Houston took the ball back at their own 3-yard line and moved into scoring range. Despite two sacks by the Jets on the drive, Moon completed 7/8 passes, including a 17-yarder to running back Lorenzo White, moving the team close enough for Del Greco to make a franchise postseason record 53-yard field goal to increase their lead to 17–10.

New York responded with a drive to the Oilers' 3-yard line. Facing fourth down and inches, running back Freeman McNeil tried to advance the ball but was tackled for no gain. Late in the game, New York had another chance to score when safety Lonnie Young forced a fumble while sacking Moon and Tony Stargell recovered for the Jets on the Oilers' 26-yard line, but they turned it over on downs again. With just over a minute left, New York managed to get the ball back for one last drive, but McDowell intercepted a pass from O'Brien on the game's final play.

Moon completed 28/40 passes for 278 yards and two touchdowns, with one interception. Toon caught eight passes for 91 yards and a score. New York linebacker Mo Lewis had two sacks.

This would be the final post-season victory for the Houston Oilers; as by the time of the franchise's next postseason victory; the team had relocated from Houston to Nashville and had been renamed the Tennessee Titans.

This was the first postseason meeting between the Jets and Oilers.

The Oilers’ victory over the Jets started a streak of playoff success for Houston-based teams against their New York City counterparts. Following the Oilers’ victory, the NBA’s Houston Rockets defeated the New York Knicks in the 1994 NBA Finals, and then the MLB’s Houston Astros defeated the New York Yankees in the MLB postseason in 2015, 2017, 2019, and 2022.

== Divisional round ==
=== Saturday, January 4, 1992 ===
==== NFC: Washington Redskins 24, Atlanta Falcons 7 ====
Atlanta Falcons vs. Washington Redskins – Game summary

| Quarter | 1 | 2 | 3 | 4 | Total |
|---|---|---|---|---|---|
| Falcons | 0 | 7 | 0 | 0 | 7 |
| Redskins | 0 | 14 | 3 | 7 | 24 |

at Robert F. Kennedy Memorial Stadium, Washington, D.C.

- Game time: 12:30 p.m. EST
- Game weather: 49 °F (9 °C), heavy rain with strong winds
- Game attendance: 55,181
- Referee: Red Cashion
- TV announcers (CBS): Verne Lundquist (play-by-play) and Dan Fouts (color commentator)

Game information

First quarter

- No scoring plays.

Second quarter

- WAS – Ricky Ervins 17-yard run (Chip Lohmiller kick). Redskins 7–0.
- WAS – Gerald Riggs 2-yard run (Chip Lohmiller kick). Redskins 14–0.
- ATL – Tracy Johnson 1-yard run (Norm Johnson kick). Redskins 14–7.

Third quarter

- WAS – Chip Lohmiller 24-yard field goal. Redskins 17–7.

Fourth quarter

- WAS – Gerald Riggs 1-yard run (Chip Lohmiller kick). Redskins 24–7.

Top passers

- ATL – Chris Miller – 17/32, 178 yards, 4 INT
- WAS – Mark Rypien – 14/29, 170 yards, INT

Top rushers

- ATL – Tracy Johnson – 8 rushes, 33 yards, TD
- WAS – Ricky Ervins – 23 rushes, 104 yards, TD

Top receivers

- ATL – Andre Rison – 7 receptions, 62 yards
- WAS – Gary Clark – 6 receptions, 64 yards

During their regular season meeting, Washington defeated Atlanta 56–17, with quarterback Mark Rypien throwing for 446 yards and six touchdowns. Atlanta starting quarterback Chris Miller and cornerback Deion Sanders missed that initial meeting however. In this game the score was closer, but the result was still the same.

Under rainy and muddy conditions, the Falcons' pass-happy run-and-shoot offense turned the ball over six times, with Miller, who had problems all game with his footing, throwing four interceptions and getting sacked four times. The Redskins held the ball for over 36 minutes, scoring two touchdowns in a span of 3:11 in the second quarter. Washington scored first by driving 81 yards to score on running back Ricky Ervins's 17-yard rushing touchdown. Then, Redskins defensive end Charles Mann forced a fumble from Pat Chaffey that was recovered by Jumpy Geathers, giving the Redskins a first down on the Falcons 39-yard line. Following two runs by Earnest Byner for 11 yards, Rypien completed a 26-yard pass to Ricky Sanders on the 2, and Gerald Riggs ran the ball into the end zone on the next play.

Now up 14–0 with 9:25 left in the second quarter, Washington squandered multiple chances to build a 3-score lead. A blitz from Washington cornerback A. J. Johnson caused Miller to throw a wobbly pass that was intercepted by Martin Mayhew on the Falcons' 29-yard line. But after driving to the 10, Rypien returned the favor with an interception to Atlanta safety Brian Jordan. The Redskins quickly got another chance to score due to an interception by linebacker Kurt Gouveia, but this drive also ended with no points, due to a missed 37-yard field goal attempt from Chip Lohmiller. Atlanta then drove 80 yards to score on Tracy Johnson's 1-yard touchdown run with 57 seconds left in the half, while Lohmiller missed a 44-yard field goal attempt as time in the second quarter ran out, his third miss of the day. So despite three first-half turnovers, Atlanta went into their locker room trailing only 14–7.

In the second half, the Redskins nearly faced disaster when long snapper John Brandes bounced his snap to punter Kelly Goodburn along the ground, but Goodburn managed to pick the ball up and kick a 37-yard punt just in time. "Your reflexes take over", Goodburn said after the game. "It happened so fast that you just react. Fortunately, I got them off. I was a shortstop in high school. That might have helped." The play turned out to be crucial, as Washington's defense forced the Falcons to go three-and-out on their next possession. Then Brian Mitchell returned Scott Fulhage's 34-yard punt 26 yards to the Atlanta 18-yard line. The Redskins only managed to move the ball 11 yards, but this time Lohmiller cashed in with a 24-yard field goal, giving Washington a 17–7 lead.

The third quarter ended just over six minutes later, shortly after a missed 45-yard field goal attempt by Falcons kicker Norm Johnson, which turned out to be Atlanta's last chance to get back in the game. Less than two minutes into the fourth quarter, Falcons receiver Michael Haynes lost a fumble while being tackled by Gouveia, which linebacker Wilber Marshall recovered on the Redskins' 48-yard line. Washington then managed to grind out a 52-yard drive to put the game away, with Ervins rushing for 28 yards and Rypien converting two third downs with completions to receiver Gary Clark. He threw an incomplete pass intended for Ervins on third down from the 8, but Sanders was penalized for holding, giving Washington first and goal from the four. Riggs then took the ball into the end zone with two carries, the second a 1-yard rushing touchdown, giving Washington a 24–7 lead with 6:32 left in the game, prompting the fans in attendance to shower the field with the yellow seat cushions that were given out before the game and chant "We want Dallas".

"Well, it's great", Washington coach Joe Gibbs said after the game, "but to tell you the truth, I don't want either Dallas or Detroit. They'll both be tough. But we'll wait and see what happens and take our chances."

This was the first postseason meeting between the Falcons and Redskins.

==== AFC: Denver Broncos 26, Houston Oilers 24 ====
Houston Oilers vs. Denver Broncos – Game summary

| Quarter | 1 | 2 | 3 | 4 | Total |
|---|---|---|---|---|---|
| Oilers | 14 | 7 | 0 | 3 | 24 |
| Broncos | 6 | 7 | 3 | 10 | 26 |

at Mile High Stadium, Denver, Colorado

- Game time: 4:00 p.m. EST/2:00 p.m. MST
- Game weather: 30 °F (−1 °C), cloudy
- Game attendance: 75,301
- Referee: Johnny Grier
- TV announcers (NBC): Charlie Jones (play-by-play) and Todd Christensen (color commentator)

Game information

First quarter

- HOU – Haywood Jeffires 15-yard pass from Warren Moon (Al Del Greco kick). Oilers 7–0.
- HOU – Leonard Harris 9-yard pass from Warren Moon (Al Del Greco kick). Oilers 14–0.
- DEN – Vance Johnson 10-yard pass from John Elway (kick failed). Oilers 14–6.

Second quarter

- HOU – Curtis Duncan 6-yard pass from Warren Moon (Al Del Greco kick). Oilers 21–6.
- DEN – Greg Lewis 1-yard run (David Treadwell kick). Oilers 21–13.

Third quarter

- DEN – David Treadwell 49-yard field goal. Oilers 21–16.

Fourth quarter

- HOU – Al Del Greco 25-yard field goal. Oilers 24–16.
- DEN – Greg Lewis 1-yard run (David Treadwell kick). Oilers 24–23.
- DEN – David Treadwell 28-yard field goal. Broncos 26–24.

Top passers

- HOU – Warren Moon – 27/36, 325 yards, 3 TD, INT
- DEN – John Elway – 19/33, 257 yards, TD, INT

Top rushers

- HOU – Lorenzo White – 17 rushes, 79 yards
- DEN – Gaston Green – 17 rushes, 59 yards

Top receivers

- HOU – Ernest Givins – 6 receptions, 111 yards
- DEN – Mike Young – 4 receptions, 85 yards

Trailing 24–23 with 2:07 left in the game, quarterback John Elway led the Broncos 87 yards from their own 2-yard line to the winning 28-yard field goal by David Treadwell with 16 seconds left. On the drive, he converted on two fourth downs. On fourth down and 6 from the Denver 28, he rushed for seven yards. Then on fourth down and 10, he completed a 44-yard pass to wide receiver Vance Johnson.

The Oilers jumped to a 14–0 lead with quarterback Warren Moon's two touchdown passes to wide receivers Haywood Jeffires and Drew Hill for 15 and nine yards, respectively. Elway then completed a 10-yard touchdown pass to Johnson, but Treadwell missed the extra point. Moon responded by throwing a 6-yard touchdown to wide receiver Curtis Duncan to give Houston a 21–6 lead, but Denver safety Steve Atwater's interception set up Greg Lewis' 1-yard run touchdown before halftime on an 88-yard drive, making the score 21–13.

In the second half, each team scored a field goal, which gave Houston a 24–16 lead in the fourth quarter. The Broncos then marched 80 yards to score on Lewis's 1-yard touchdown run on a drive that included a fumbled snap on 3rd and 8 that Elway recovered to complete a 12-yard first-down pass to Johnson, and a 26-yard completion to Mike Young on fourth down and four. Denver's defense subsequently forced a punt for the first time in the game, and Greg Montgomery's 44-yard kick was downed on the 2-yard line. From there, Elway started off the drive with a 22-yard pass to Young. The Broncos were forced into fourth downs twice in a row after that, but Elway converted each one with a 7-yard run and 44-yard completion to Johnson at the Oilers' 21-yard line. One play later, Treadwell kicked a 28-yard field goal for the win.

Moon finished the game with 27 of 36 completions for 325 yards and three touchdowns, with one interception. Six of his passes were caught by Ernest Givins for 111 yards.

This was the third postseason meeting between the Oilers and Broncos. Both teams split the previous two meetings.

Previous playoff games
Tied 1–1 in all-time playoff games

1979

Denver Broncos 7 @ Houston Oilers 13

1979 AFC Wild Card playoffs

1987

Houston Oilers 10 @ Denver Broncos 34

1987 AFC Divisional playoffs

=== Sunday, January 5, 1992 ===
==== AFC: Buffalo Bills 37, Kansas City Chiefs 14 ====
Kansas City Chiefs vs. Buffalo Bills – Game summary

| Quarter | 1 | 2 | 3 | 4 | Total |
|---|---|---|---|---|---|
| Chiefs | 0 | 0 | 7 | 7 | 14 |
| Bills | 7 | 10 | 7 | 13 | 37 |

at Rich Stadium, Orchard Park, New York

- Game time: 12:30 p.m. EST
- Game weather: 37 °F (3 °C), occasional rain
- Game attendance: 80,182
- Referee: Pat Haggerty
- TV announcers (NBC): Dick Enberg (play-by-play) and Bill Walsh (color commentator)
- Recap, Game Book

Game information

First quarter

- BUF – Andre Reed 25-yard pass from Jim Kelly (Scott Norwood kick). Bills 7–0.

Second quarter

- BUF – Andre Reed 53-yard pass from Jim Kelly (Scott Norwood kick). Bills 14–0.
- BUF – Scott Norwood 33-yard field goal. Bills 17–0.

Third quarter

- BUF – James Lofton 10-yard pass from Jim Kelly (Scott Norwood kick). Bills 24–0.
- KC – Barry Word 3-yard run (Nick Lowery kick). Bills 24–7.

Fourth quarter

- BUF – Scott Norwood 20-yard field goal. Bills 27–7.
- BUF – Scott Norwood 47-yard field goal. Bills 30–7.
- BUF – Kenneth Davis 5-yard run (Scott Norwood kick). Bills 37–7.
- KC – Fred Jones 20-yard pass from Mark Vlasic (Nick Lowery kick). Bills 37–14.

Top passers

- KC – Mark Vlasic – 9/20, 124 yards, TD, 4 INT
- BUF – Jim Kelly – 23/35, 373 yards, 3 TD, 3 INT

Top rushers

- KC – Barry Word – 15 rushes, 50 yards, TD
- BUF – Thurman Thomas – 22 rushes, 100 yards

Top receivers

- KC – Todd McNair – 5 receptions, 52 yards
- BUF – Andre Reed – 4 receptions, 100 yards, 2 TD

Buffalo avenged their 33–6 Monday night loss to Kansas City during the regular season by eliminating them from the playoffs with a dominating 37–14 win, outgaining them in total yards 448–213. The Bills were aided by the return of defensive end Bruce Smith and Jeff Wright, who had missed almost the entire regular season with injuries, including their prior meeting with the Chiefs. Their offense was bolstered by the return of prior injured receiver Don Beebe, who caught six passes for 78 yards in this game, and James Lofton, who had missed the last two regular season games with an ankle injury.

The Bills crushed the Chiefs by jumping to a 24–0 lead in the third quarter. Buffalo quarterback Jim Kelly threw for 278 yards and three touchdowns. Bills kicker Scott Norwood, who had missed five of his last six field goal attempts at the end of the regular season, made all three field goal attempts, while Andre Reed finished with four receptions for 100 yards and two touchdowns. Running back Thurman Thomas recorded 100 rushing yards, while Kenneth Davis rushed for 75 yards and a score. The Chiefs had gained 239 rushing yards in the regular season game against Buffalo, with running back Harvey Williams and fullback Christian Okoye rushing for over 100 yards each, but could only gain 77 yards on the ground (with 3.2 yards per carry average) in this playoff rematch, with their leading rusher (Barry Word) gaining just 50.

After each team punted twice, Buffalo took a 7–0 lead by driving 80 yards in 8 plays to score on Kelly's 25-yard touchdown pass to Reed with 52 seconds left in the first quarter. Then after forcing a punt, the Bills drove to the Chiefs' 40-yard line, but lost the ball when a deflected pass went into the arms of Eric Everett. Still, the Bills forced another punt, which Clifford Hicks returned 16 yards to the Bills' 31-yard line. From there, Buffalo drove 69 yards in just four plays, going up 14–0 with Kelly's 53-yard touchdown completion to Reed. Meanwhile, the situation continued to deteriorate for Kansas City, as on their next drive, quarterback Steve DeBerg was knocked out of the game with a thumb injury and replaced by Mark Vlasic. Following another punt, Deron Cherry intercepted a pass from Kelly near the Chiefs' 15-yard line. But a sack from safety Leonard Smith forced Kansas City to punt from inside their own goal line, and gave the Bills good field position on their 45. The Chiefs had a golden opportunity to score a few plays later when Kelly threw an interception to Kevin Ross near the sidelines. Ross had a clear path in front of him to the end zone, but he dropped the pass as he started to run and the ball fell incomplete. Buffalo went on to drive to a 33-yard field goal by Norwood that gave them a 17–0 lead going into halftime.

On the second play of the third quarter, Kirby Jackson of the Bills intercepted a pass from Vlasic and returned it 6 yards to the Chiefs' 36-yard line. Buffalo went on to go up 24–0 with a 6-play drive that ended on Kelly's 10-yard touchdown pass to Lofton. A few possessions later, Jackson picked up his second interception. But on the Bills' ensuing drive, Chiefs linebacker Lonnie Marts intercepted a pass from Kelly and returned it 12 yards to the Bills' 44-yard line. Vlasic's following completions to Tim Barnett and Jonathan Hayes for gains of 20 and 21 yards moved the ball to the 3, and Word eventually ran the ball into the end zone to make the score 24–7.

But Buffalo took over the game from that point on, driving right back by moving the ball 68 yards in 14 plays, including a 19-yard run by Thomas. Norwood finished the drive with a 20-yard field goal to put his team up 27–7 with 10:54 left in the game. Then Leonard Smith's interception gave Buffalo a first down on the Chiefs' 31-yard line, setting up Norwood's 47-yard field goal to increase the lead to 30–7. Vlasic's next pass was intercepted again, this time by Hicks on the Chiefs' 34-yard line, enabling Buffalo to go up 37–7 on Davis's 5-yard rushing touchdown. Kansas City responded with an 80-yard drive to score on Vlasic's 20-yard touchdown pass to Fred Jones, but by then only 2:07 was left on the clock.

This was Thomas's fourth straight postseason game with at least 100 rushing yards, the second longest streak in NFL history (behind John Riggins's 6).

This was the second postseason meeting between the Chiefs and Bills. Kansas City won the only previous meeting when both teams were part of the AFL.

Previous playoff games
Kansas City leads 1–0 in all-time playoff games

1966

Kansas City Chiefs 31 @ Buffalo Bills 7

1966 AFL Championship Game

==== NFC: Detroit Lions 38, Dallas Cowboys 6 ====
Dallas Cowboys vs. Detroit Lions – Game summary

| Quarter | 1 | 2 | 3 | 4 | Total |
|---|---|---|---|---|---|
| Cowboys | 3 | 3 | 0 | 0 | 6 |
| Lions | 7 | 10 | 14 | 7 | 38 |

at Pontiac Silverdome, Pontiac, Michigan

- Game time: 4:00 p.m. EST
- Game weather: Played indoors, domed stadium
- Game attendance: 79,835
- Referee: Gordon McCarter
- TV announcers (CBS): Pat Summerall (play-by-play) and John Madden (color commentator)

Game information

First quarter

- DET – Willie Green 31-yard pass from Erik Kramer (Eddie Murray kick). Lions 7–0.
- DAL – Ken Willis 28-yard field goal. Lions 7–3.

Second quarter

- DET – Mel Jenkins 41-yard interception return (Eddie Murray kick). Lions 14–3.
- DAL – Ken Willis 28-yard field goal. Lions 14–6.
- DET – Eddie Murray 36-yard field goal. Lions 17–6.

Third quarter

- DET – Willie Green 9-yard pass from Erik Kramer (Eddie Murray kick). Lions 24–6.
- DET – Herman Moore 7-yard pass from Erik Kramer (Eddie Murray kick). Lions 31–6.

Fourth quarter

- DET – Barry Sanders 47-yard run (Eddie Murray kick). Lions 38–6.

Top passers

- DAL – Troy Aikman – 11/16, 114 yards, INT
- DET – Erik Kramer – 29/38, 341 yards, 3 TD

Top rushers

- DAL – Emmitt Smith – 15 rushes, 80 yards
- DET – Barry Sanders – 12 rushes, 69 yards, TD

Top receivers

- DAL – Michael Irvin – 5 receptions, 84 yards
- DET – Willie Green – 8 receptions, 115 yards, 2 TD

Detroit had defeated Dallas 34–10 in the regular season, and this meeting would be no different. Quarterback Erik Kramer led the Lions to their first postseason victory since 1957 by completing 29 out of 38 passes for 341 yards and three touchdowns. Dallas quarterback Steve Beuerlein completed just seven of 13 passes for 91 yards and an interception, before being replaced by Troy Aikman, who was unable to lead the team to any points after stepping on the field. Overall, Detroit outgained the Cowboys in total yards 421–276 and forced four turnovers, without losing any of their own.

After forcing Dallas to punt on their opening drive, Kramer completed passes to Herman Moore, Mike Farr and Willie Green for gains of 11, 13, and 13 yards before he finished the 68-yard drive with a 31-yard touchdown pass to Green. Dallas responded with a pair of receptions by Michael Irvin for 35 yards and an 18-yard run from Emmitt Smith setting up a 28-yard field goal by Ken Willis. But the next time Dallas had the ball, Melvin Jenkins intercepted a pass from Beuerlein and returned it 41 yards for a touchdown. After the Cowboys responded with another 28-yard Willis field goal, Eddie Murray's 36-yard field goal made the score 17–6 at halftime. Near the end of the half, Cowboys coach Jimmy Johnson benched Beuerlein in favor of Aikman, but this did not improve the Cowboys' fortunes. On the final two plays of the second quarter, Aikman was sacked and then threw an interception to linebacker Chris Spielman.

Early in the second half, Kramer finished an 80-yard drive with a 9-yard touchdown pass to Green. Then linebacker Victor Jones recovered a fumble from Aikman on the Cowboys' 27, leading to Kramer's 7-yard touchdown pass to Moore. In the fourth quarter, Lions running back Barry Sanders, who had been held to just 22 rushing yards up to this point, put the finishing touch on Detroit's victory with an electrifying 47-yard touchdown run.

Green finished the day with eight receptions for 115 yards and two touchdowns. Sanders's touchdown would be the only postseason score of his Hall of Fame career.

This was the Lions' sole playoff victory between the 1957 NFL Championship Game and a wild-card round victory over the Los Angeles Rams in the 2023–24 NFL playoffs. It was the only one ever to occur at the Pontiac Silverdome, where the Lions played from 1975 to 2001. The Silverdome's demolition in 2018 started a period where only Kezar Stadium in San Francisco, which still stands in a form much reduced from its time as the 49ers' home field, had played host to a Lions postseason victory; this period ended with the Lions' aforementioned 2023–24 wild card win over the Rams.

This was the second postseason meeting between the Cowboys and Lions. Dallas won the only previous meeting.

Previous playoff games
Dallas leads 1–0 in all-time playoff games

1970

Detroit Lions 0 @ Dallas Cowboys 5

1970 NFC Divisional playoffs

== Conference championships ==
=== Sunday, January 12, 1992 ===
==== AFC: Buffalo Bills 10, Denver Broncos 7 ====
Denver Broncos vs. Buffalo Bills – Game summary

| Quarter | 1 | 2 | 3 | 4 | Total |
|---|---|---|---|---|---|
| Broncos | 0 | 0 | 0 | 7 | 7 |
| Bills | 0 | 0 | 7 | 3 | 10 |

at Rich Stadium, Orchard Park, New York

- Game time: 12:30 p.m. EST
- Game weather: 34 °F (1 °C), clear
- Game attendance: 80,272
- Referee: Dale Hamer
- TV announcers (NBC): Dick Enberg (play-by-play) and Bill Walsh (color commentator)

Game information

First quarter

- No scoring plays.

Second quarter

- No scoring plays.

Third quarter

- BUF – Carlton Bailey 11-yard interception return (Scott Norwood kick). Bills 7–0.

Fourth quarter

- BUF – Scott Norwood 44-yard field goal. Bills 10–0.
- DEN – Gary Kubiak 3-yard run (David Treadwell kick). Bills 10–7.

Top passers

- DEN – Gary Kubiak – 11/12, 136 yards
- BUF – Jim Kelly – 13/25, 117 yards, 2 INT

Top rushers

- DEN – Gaston Green – 19 rushes, 53 yards
- BUF – Thurman Thomas – 26 rushes, 72 yards

Top receivers

- DEN – Vance Johnson – 7 receptions, 100 yards
- BUF – Keith McKeller – 3 receptions, 39 yards

Buffalo relied on missed field goals by Denver and some key plays from their defense to edge the Broncos 10–7, in what was a knock-down, drag-out defensive drama that featured devastating pass rushes that limited both offenses to meager, hard-fought-for yardage throughout the game.

The score was 0–0 at the half, even though Denver advanced into Buffalo territory on all five of their first-half possessions. After the first three drives of the game ended in punts, Vance Johnson gave Denver good field position with a 13-yard return to their 49-yard line. The Broncos then drove to the Bills' 34-yard line, but three consecutive plays for negative yardage, including a big sack on third down by Jeff Wright, pushed them all the way back to their own side of the field. After their punt, Denver quickly got another scoring chance when Ron Holmes deflected Bills quarterback Jim Kelly's pass at the line of scrimmage and nose tackle Greg Kragen made a diving interception on the Buffalo 29-yard line. But again Denver ended up with negative yardage and failed to score when David Treadwell was wide right on a 47-yard field goal attempt. Buffalo then drove to Denver territory for the first time in the game, but were stopped there and had to punt.

The Broncos then went on a rough back-and-forth drive featuring numerous penalties (including an encroachment call against the Bills on fourth down and 4), negative plays, an Elway fumble that he recovered himself, and an interception overturned by replay review. Despite all this, Denver managed to reach the Bills' 16-yard line, but then Elway's fumble and recovery lost the team five yards and a third-down sack by Bruce Smith pushed them back another 8. On the next play, Treadwell missed a 42-yard field goal attempt, this time hitting the right upright. Johnson returned Buffalo's next punt 10 yards to midfield. Then on Denver's first play, Steve Sewell gained 26 yards on a screen pass. But after two tackles near the line of scrimmage by Cornelius Bennett, Elway was stopped on a quarterback draw and Treadwell missed again, this time hitting the right upright from 37 yards out. Meanwhile, Buffalo finished the half with just three first downs, one week after racking up 29 in their win over Kansas City.

Early in the third quarter, Denver quarterback John Elway (who was sacked three times) suffered a deep thigh bruise that limited his mobility. Meanwhile, Buffalo finally managed to mount a sustained drive. Aided by a 16-yard run from Andre Reed on a reverse play, they drove all the way to the Broncos' 27-yard line. But continuing the trend of the day, they failed to capitalize when defensive back Tyrone Braxton intercepted Kelly's third down pass.

On the Broncos' ensuing possession, they faced second down and 10 at their own 19-yard line. Elway attempted a middle screen pass to Sewell (which had been Denver's most effective play), but it was tipped by Wright into the arms of linebacker Carlton Bailey. Bailey broke an Elway tackle and returned the ball 11 yards for what would be Buffalo's only touchdown of the game.

Elway's injury worsened to the point of his being replaced by backup Gary Kubiak in the fourth quarter. Kubiak managed to lead the Broncos into Bills territory, but they turned the ball over on downs when Cliff Hicks tackled Mike Young on the Buffalo 23-yard line one yard short of a first down on fourth and 11. After being completely dominated up to this point, Buffalo's offense got on track with a pivotal 25-yard third-down completion by Kelly to tight end Keith McKeller. A few runs by hobbled Buffalo running back Thurman Thomas and a 10-yard catch by Reed carried the Bills to within field goal range, and with 4:18 left in the game, Buffalo kicker Scott Norwood made a 44-yard field goal to increase the lead to 10–0.

Kubiak, who was playing in his last NFL game before retiring, started out the Broncos next drive with an 11-yard scramble and then a completion to Johnson at midfield. Another completion to Johnson moved the ball to the 43, and then Mark Jackson caught a pass for a first down at the Bills' 39. Following an encroachment penalty and an incompletion, Johnson made a spinning mid-air catch on the Bills' 10-yard line. Then after Johnson hauled in his fourth reception of the drive, Kubiak finished the 8-play. 85-yard drive with a 3-yard touchdown run on a quarterback draw, cutting the deficit to 10–7 with less than two minutes left. Steve Atwater then recovered the ensuing onside kick on the Broncos' 49-yard line, but on the next play Kirby Jackson forced and recovered a fumble from Sewell with 1:28 left. Denver forced Buffalo to punt, but there were only 17 seconds left when they started their drive from their own 20-yard line. Kubiak completed two passes to move his team near midfield. However, the second play ended in bounds and the clock ran out.

Denver finished the game leading in almost every statistical category, except for rushing. Johnson, who had only 208 receiving yards during the season, finished with seven receptions for 100 yards and three punt returns for 36 yards. Kubiak completed 11 of 12 passes for 136 yards and rushed for 22 yards, outscoring and out-passing Kelly and Elway. The Broncos defense held the high-powered Bills offense to 13 catches (most of them completed to tight ends and running backs) and three offensive points.

This was the first postseason meeting between the Broncos and Bills.

==== NFC: Washington Redskins 41, Detroit Lions 10 ====
Detroit Lions vs. Washington Redskins – Game summary

| Quarter | 1 | 2 | 3 | 4 | Total |
|---|---|---|---|---|---|
| Lions | 0 | 10 | 0 | 0 | 10 |
| Redskins | 10 | 7 | 10 | 14 | 41 |

at Robert F. Kennedy Memorial Stadium, Washington, D.C.

- Game time: 4:00 p.m. EST/1:00 p.m. PST
- Game weather: 40 °F (4 °C), clear
- Game attendance: 55,585
- Referee: Bob McElwee
- TV announcers (CBS): Pat Summerall (play-by-play) and John Madden (color commentator)
- Box score

Game information

First quarter

- WAS – Gerald Riggs 2-yard run (Chip Lohmiller kick). Redskins 7–0.
- WAS – Chip Lohmiller 20-yard field goal. Redskins 10–0.

Second quarter

- DET – Willie Green 18-yard pass from Erik Kramer (Eddie Murray kick). Redskins 10–7.
- WAS – Gerald Riggs 3-yard run (Chip Lohmiller kick). Redskins 17–7.
- DET – Eddie Murray 30-yard field goal. Redskins 17–10.

Third quarter

- WAS – Chip Lohmiller 28-yard field goal. Redskins 20–10.
- WAS – Gary Clark 45-yard pass from Mark Rypien (Chip Lohmiller kick). Redskins 27–10.

Fourth quarter

- WAS – Art Monk 21-yard pass from Mark Rypien (Chip Lohmiller kick). Redskins 34–10.
- WAS – Darrell Green 32-yard interception return (Chip Lohmiller kick). Redskins 41–10.

Top passers

- DET – Erik Kramer – 21/33, 249 yards, TD, INT
- WAS – Mark Rypien – 12/17, 228 yards, 2 TD

Top rushers

- DET – Barry Sanders – 11 rushes, 44 yards
- WAS – Earnest Byner – 17 rushes, 62 yards

Top receivers

- DET – Mike Farr – 6 receptions, 73 yards
- WAS – Art Monk – 5 receptions, 94 yards, TD

In their season opening game, Washington beat the Lions 45–0. The Lions now had future Hall of Fame running back Barry Sanders, who had missed their first meeting in Week 1 with an injury, but it didn't help.

The Redskins crushed the Lions, 41–10, as quarterback Mark Rypien completed 12 out of 17 passes for 228 yards and two touchdowns. Detroit quarterback Erik Kramer was sacked five times, three of them by Washington linebacker Wilber Marshall. Sanders, who rushed for 1,548 yards during the season, was held to just 44 yards on 11 carries.

The Redskins forced two turnovers on the Lions' first two possessions, and jumped to a 10–0 lead just 4:02 into the game. On Detroit's first play of the game, Washington defensive end Charles Mann forced Kramer to fumble and Fred Stokes recovered the ball on the Lions' 10, setting up running back Gerald Riggs' 2-yard touchdown. Then Redskins kicker Chip Lohmiller made a 20-yard field goal after linebacker Kurt Gouveia intercepted a pass and returned it 38 yards to the Detroit 10-yard line. In the second quarter, Kramer led the Lions 75 yards in 11 plays to score on his 18-yard touchdown pass to wide receiver Willie Green, but it was countered by Washington's 73-yard drive leading to a 3-yard touchdown run by Riggs. Detroit then drove 76 yards to score on Eddie Murray's 30-yard field goal and the Redskins only led 17–10 at halftime.

However, Washington scored 24 unanswered points in the second half, starting with Lohmiller's 28-yard field goal that was set up by Rypien's 45-yard completion to tight end Terry Orr, making the score 20–10. On Detroit's second drive of the third quarter, they moved the ball 45 yards to the Redskins' 21-yard line, but on third and 5, linebacker Andre Collins sacked Kramer for a 5-yard loss. Then Murray's 44-yard field goal attempt was blocked by Jumpy Geathers. Rypien completed a 31-yard pass to Art Monk on the Redskins' ensuing drive, and followed it up with a 45-yard touchdown pass to Gary Clark that gave the Redskins a 27–10 lead. He added a 21-yard touchdown pass to Monk in the fourth quarter, while Darrell Green finished off the scoring by returning an interception 32 yards for a score.

After the game, the Redskins dedicated their win to WUSA sports anchor Glenn Brenner, who died from a brain tumor two days after the game.

This was the final postseason game at RFK Stadium. The Redskins went 11–1 at the facility in the playoffs, losing only a 1984 divisional-round game to the Bears.

This was the second postseason meeting between the Lions and Redskins. Washington won the only previous meeting.

This loss began a nine-game postseason skid for the Lions which ended in the 2023 season. The last eight were in the wild card round, including a 27–13 setback to the Redskins at FedEx Field in 1999. In 2024, they ended the streak in a win against the Los Angeles Rams in the Wild Card round. It would be a long time before either franchise advanced to the NFC Championship Game again, with Detroit returning there in 2023, the same year they ended their playoff losing streak. Washington would end their drought a year later in 2024, by defeating the Lions again in the Divisional round.

Previous playoff games
Washington leads 1–0 in all-time playoff games

1982

Detroit Lions 7 @ Washington Redskins 31

1982 NFC First Round playoffs

== Super Bowl XXVI: Washington Redskins 37, Buffalo Bills 24 ==
Super Bowl XXVI – Washington Redskins vs. Buffalo Bills – Game summary

| Quarter | 1 | 2 | 3 | 4 | Total |
|---|---|---|---|---|---|
| Redskins (NFC) | 0 | 17 | 14 | 6 | 37 |
| Bills (AFC) | 0 | 0 | 10 | 14 | 24 |

at Hubert H. Humphrey Metrodome, Minneapolis, Minnesota

- Date: January 26, 1992
- Game attendance: 63,130
- Referee: Jerry Markbreit
- TV announcers (CBS): Pat Summerall (play-by-play) and John Madden (color commentator)

This was the first Super Bowl meeting between the Redskins and Bills.

== Bibliography ==
- Total Football: The Official Encyclopedia of the National Football League (ISBN 0-06-270174-6)
- The Sporting News Complete Super Bowl Book 1995 (ISBN 0-89204-523-X)
