= Melvin Jenkins =

American football player (born 1962)

No. 28, 24, 20
- Position: Cornerback

Personal information
- Born: March 16, 1962 (age 64); Jackson, Mississippi, U.S.
- Listed height: 5 ft 10 in (1.78 m)
- Listed weight: 172 lb (78 kg)

Career information
- High school: Wingfield (Jackson)
- College: Cincinnati
- NFL draft: 1984: undrafted

Career history
- Calgary Stampeders (1984–1986); Seattle Seahawks (1987–1990); Detroit Lions (1991–1993); Atlanta Falcons (1993)

Career NFL statistics
- Interceptions: 11
- Fumble recoveries: 7
- Sacks: 1
- Stats at Pro Football Reference

Melvin Jenkins (born March 16, 1962) is an American former professional football player who was a cornerback for seven seasons with the Seattle Seahawks, Detroit Lions, and Atlanta Falcons of the National Football League (NFL). He also played in the Canadian Football League (CFL) for the Calgary Stampeders. He played college football for the Cincinnati Bearcats.
