= Fred Jones (wide receiver) =

American football player (born 1967)

No. 80
- Position: Wide receiver

Personal information
- Born: March 6, 1967 (age 59); Atlanta, Georgia, U.S.
- Listed height: 5 ft 9 in (1.75 m)
- Listed weight: 175 lb (79 kg)

Career information
- High school: Southwest DeKalb (Decatur, Georgia)
- College: Grambling State
- NFL draft: 1990: 4th round, 96th overall pick

Career history
- Kansas City Chiefs (1990–1993)

Career NFL statistics
- Receptions: 36
- Receiving yards: 466
- Return yards: 530
- Stats at Pro Football Reference

Fred Jones (born March 6, 1967) is an American former professional football player who was a wide receiver for four seasons with the Kansas City Chiefs of the National Football League (NFL). He played college football for the Grambling State Tigers and was selected by the Chiefs in the fourth round of the 1990 NFL draft.

== College career ==
Jones played his collegiate career under the leadership of National Collegiate Athletic Association coach Eddie Robinson at Grambling State University in Grambling, Louisiana. While under the tutelage and stewardship of Coach Robinson, Jones excelled as a student at Grambling and as an athlete within Grambling's athletic program in the Southwestern Athletic Conference (SWAC). He graduated with a degree in Education from Grambling State University's NCATE Accredited College of Education. Grambling State University won the Bayou Classic twice while Jones was playing for the university.

Jones is also a graduate of Southwest Dekalb High School in Decatur, Georgia. While attending Southwest Dekalb he played under the stewardship of Georgia Athletic Coaches Association Hall of Famer William 'Buck' Godfrey. Jones was an offensive player and performed well under Godfrey's offensive scheme. During his senior season Jones was one of Dekalb County top offensive players and he rushed for more than 1,000 yards that season.

== Personal life ==
Jones is a member of Omega Psi Phi fraternity. He is involved in Georgia high school football as a coach.
