= 1989 Kansas City Chiefs season =

NFL team season

- Owner: Lamar Hunt
- General manager: Carl Peterson
- Head coach: Marty Schottenheimer
- Home stadium: Arrowhead Stadium

Results
- Record: 8–7–1
- Division place: 2nd AFC West
- Playoffs: Did not qualify
- All-Pros: 2: FB Christian Okoye (1st team); CB Albert Lewis (1st team)
- Pro Bowlers: 4: FB Christian Okoye; LB Derrick Thomas; CB Kevin Ross; CB Albert Lewis

The 1989 season was the Kansas City Chiefs' 20th in the National Football League, their 30th overall and their first under head coach Marty Schottenheimer and general manager Carl Peterson. They improved on their 4–11–1 record from 1988 and finished with an 8–7–1 record. The Chiefs did not qualify for the playoffs in for the third straight year but did send four players to the Pro Bowl. The Chiefs Week 11 10–10 tie against the Cleveland Browns remains the most recent tie in Chiefs history.

== Background ==
The Chiefs had changed coaches before, but never had the organization gone through the complete overhaul it did between the 1988 and 1989 seasons. On December 19, 1988, Lamar Hunt hired Carl Peterson as the team's new president/general manager. On January 5 Peterson fired head coach Frank Gansz, just two weeks after taking over. On January 24 he hired Marty Schottenheimer, who was fired by Cleveland Browns owner Art Modell. Schottenheimer also cleaned house, bringing over several assistants who would later become NFL head coaches including Tony Dungy, Herman Edwards (who would later be head coach of the Chiefs), Bruce Arians and devoted Schottenheimer disciple Bill Cowher. Dungy and Cowher would eventually be inducted into the Pro Football Hall of Fame, with Cowher specifically mentioning Schottenheimer by name as someone who belongs in the Hall.

With Peterson's help, Schottenheimer also made several roster changes, including drafting future hall of famer Derrick Thomas. Thomas later became a key part to the Chiefs defense in 90s and became one of the most popular players with fans in franchise history before his premature death in February 2000.

The team also signed Hall of Fame center Mike Webster after initially hiring him as an offensive line coach. While his signing wasn't controversial at the time, multiple lawsuits following his death in 2002 proved that Webster was already disabled when the Pittsburgh Steelers (the team he's most associated with) chose to leave him unprotected in Plan B free agency and that Webster likely shouldn't have continued playing when signing with the Chiefs; the brain disease chronic traumatic encephalopathy (CTE) would be initially discovered during his autopsy. He would go up against the Steelers at Three Rivers Stadium in Week 8 in what would prove be the Chiefs last trip to Pittsburgh for 17 years and the team's last-ever trip to Three Rivers Stadium; the two teams would meet 8 times in the ensuing years (including in the wild card round in the 1993 playoffs), all at Arrowhead Stadium, before the teams played at the Steelers current home Heinz Field in 2006.

== Season summary ==
The Chiefs started the season at Denver on September 10 but the Chiefs lost the opener, 34–20. The very next Sunday the Chiefs downed the Los Angeles Raiders 24–19, garnering Schottenheimer's first win as Chiefs' head coach.

The Chiefs would start the season 1–4, but soon turned things around. On October 22, Christian Okoye carried the ball 33 times for 170 yards as the Chiefs defeated the Dallas Cowboys at Arrowhead Stadium, 36–28.

On November 26, Kansas City cruised past the Houston Oilers, 34–0 to start a 3-game winning streak to give themselves a chance to make the playoffs.

On December 17, using a bruising running game and a smothering defense, the San Diego Chargers marched into Arrowhead Stadium and crushed the Chiefs' playoffs dreams. They bulldozed their way to 219 yards rushing, 176 by Marion Butts, and won 20–13. The all but eliminated the Chiefs from any chance of making the playoffs. Chiefs' quarterback Steve DeBerg was ineffective because of the chilling 18-degree weather and completed just 14 of 33 passes. Okoye constantly found his path blocked, holes jammed. The Chiefs had one final opportunity to tie the game, driving from their own 36 yard line to the San Diego 19. DeBerg's next pass into the end zone was intercepted, ending the Chiefs' chances and the game. The loss left the Chiefs needing a win at Miami on Christmas Eve, combined with losses by Indianapolis, Pittsburgh and the Raiders that day and Cincinnati on Christmas Day to make the playoffs.

The next week, the Chiefs did bounce back and defeated the Miami Dolphins for the second time in the season, 27–24 and had a winning record in the first Peterson-Schottenheimer season at 8-7-1. The Bengals, Colts and Raiders also lost that weekend; however, the Steelers won their game and final AFC Playoff spot, finishing 9-7 overall.

DeBerg passed for 2,529 yards in his second season with the team. Okoye led the NFL in rushing with 1,480 yards. Stephone Paige led the receivers with 44 receptions. Rookie linebacker Derrick Thomas recorded 10 sacks.

Okoye was named to the Pro Bowl along with defensive stars Albert Lewis, Kevin Ross and Thomas.

== Offseason ==
=== NFL draft ===
1989 Kansas City Chiefs draft
Round	Pick	Player	Position	College	Notes
1	4	Derrick Thomas * ^{†}	Linebacker	Alabama	
2	32	Mike Elkins	Quarterback	Wake Forest	
3	60	Naz Worthen	Wide receiver	North Carolina State	
4	88	Stan Petry	Defensive back	TCU	
6	143	Robb Thomas	Wide receiver	Oregon State	
7	171	Ron Sancho	Linebacker	LSU	
8	199	Bryan Tobey	Running back	Grambling State	
8	220	Todd McNair	Running back	Temple	
9	227	Jack Phillips	Defensive back	Alcorn State	
10	255	Rob McGovern	Linebacker	Holy Cross	
11	283	Marcus Turner	Defensive back	UCLA	
12	311	Bill Jones	Running back	Texas State	
Made roster † Pro Football Hall of Fame * Made at least one Pro Bowl during career

=== Undrafted free agents ===
1989 undrafted free agents of note
Player	Position	College
Michael Harris	Guard	Grambling State
Brett Holley	Punter	Arizona
Robert Oliver	Wide receiver	Western Michigan
Mark Porter	Kicker	Kansas State

== Personnel ==
=== Staff ===
1989 Kansas City Chiefs staff
Front office: Founder – Lamar Hunt; Chairman of the Board – Jack Steadman; President/general manager/Chief Executive Officer – Carl Peterson; Assistant General Manager – Dennis Thum; Director of player personnel – Whitey Dovell; Head coaches: Head coach – Marty Schottenheimer; Offensive coaches: Offensive coordinator – Joe Pendry; Running backs – Bruce Arians; Wide receivers – Al Saunders; Offensive line – Howard Mudd; Offense/tight ends – Jim Erkenbeck	Defensive coaches: Defensive coordinator/linebackers – Bill Cowher; Defensive line – Tom Pratt; Defensive backs – Tony Dungy; Special assistant/quality control – Darvin Wallis; Special teams coaches: Special teams – Kurt Schottenheimer; Strength and conditioning: Strength and conditioning – Dave Redding; Assistant strength and conditioning – Russ Ball

=== Roster ===
1989 Kansas City Chiefs roster
Quarterbacks (QB): 17 Steve DeBerg; 10 Mike Elkins; 11 Steve Pelluer; Running backs (RB): 32 Tommie Agee FB; 44 Herman Heard; 48 Todd McNair; 35 Christian Okoye FB; 21 James Saxon; Wide receivers (WR): 86 Emile Harry; 89 Pete Mandley; 83 Stephone Paige; 81 Robb Thomas; 80 Clarence Weathers; 84 Naz Worthen; Tight ends (TE): 85 Jonathan Hayes; 87 Alfredo Roberts	Offensive linemen (OL): 61 Mark Adickes G; 76 John Alt T; 77 Rich Baldinger G/T; 70 Mark Cannon C; 62 Gene Chilton C/G; 75 Irv Eatman T; 73 Michael Harris T; 72 Dave Lutz G; 53 Mike Webster C; Defensive linemen (DL): 99 Mike Bell DE; 95 Bruce Clark DE; 98 Leonard Griffin DE; 69 Greg Meisner NT; 97 Dan Saleaumua NT; 90 Neil Smith DE	Linebackers (LB): 54 Walker Lee Ashley ILB; 55 Louis Cooper OLB; 56 Dino Hackett ILB; 59 Stacy Harvey OLB; 57 Chris Martin OLB; 50 Rob McGovern ILB; 58 Derrick Thomas OLB; Defensive backs (DB): 34 Lloyd Burress FS; 25 Danny Copeland SS; 29 Albert Lewis CB; 24 J. C. Pearson CB; 45 Stan Petry CB; 27 Kevin Porter SS; 31 Kevin Ross CB; Special teams (ST): 2 Kelly Goodburn P; 8 Nick Lowery K	Practice squad: 43 Bill Jones RB; -- Michael Mayes CB; -- Robert Oliver WR; -- Richard Van Druten T; 82 Danta Whitaker TE; Reserve: 20 Deron Cherry S (IR); 22 Kenny Gamble RB (IR); 7 Ron Jaworski QB (IR); 51 Mike Junkin LB (IR); 63 Bill Maas NT (IR); 52 Angelo Snipes LB (IR); 47 active, 6 inactive, 5 practice squad Rookies in italics

== Preseason ==
Week	Date	Opponent	Result	Record	Venue	Attendance	Recap
1	August 12	vs. Minnesota Vikings	L 13–23	0–1	Liberty Bowl (Memphis, TN)	63,528	Recap
2	August 20	New York Giants	L 7–45	0–2	Arrowhead Stadium	36,820	Recap
3	August 27	at Chicago Bears	W 22–17	1–2	Soldier Field	56,343	Recap
4	September 1	New York Jets	L 13–15 (OT)	1–3	Arrowhead Stadium	41,105	Recap

== Regular season ==
=== Schedule ===
Week	Date	Opponent	Result	Record	Venue	Attendance	Recap
1	September 10	at **Denver Broncos**	**L** 20–34	0–1	Mile High Stadium	74,284	Recap
2	September 17	**Los Angeles Raiders**	**W** 24–19	1–1	Arrowhead Stadium	71,741	Recap
3	September 24	at **San Diego Chargers**	**L** 6–21	1–2	Jack Murphy Stadium	40,128	Recap
4	October 1	Cincinnati Bengals	**L** 17–21	1–3	Arrowhead Stadium	61,165	Recap
5	October 8	at **Seattle Seahawks**	**W** 20–16	2–3	Kingdome	60,715	Recap
6	October 15	at **Los Angeles Raiders**	**L** 14–20	2–4	Los Angeles Memorial Coliseum	40,453	Recap
7	October 22	Dallas Cowboys	**W** 36–28	3–4	Arrowhead Stadium	76,841	Recap
8	October 29	at Pittsburgh Steelers	**L** 17–23	3–5	Three Rivers Stadium	54,194	Recap
9	November 5	**Seattle Seahawks**	**W** 20–10	4–5	Arrowhead Stadium	54,489	Recap
10	November 12	**Denver Broncos**	**L** 13–16	4–6	Arrowhead Stadium	76,245	Recap
11	November 19	at Cleveland Browns	**T** 10–10 (OT)	4–6–1	Cleveland Stadium	77,922	Recap
12	November 26	Houston Oilers	**W** 34–0	5–6–1	Arrowhead Stadium	51,342	Recap
13	December 3	Miami Dolphins	**W** 26–21	6–6–1	Arrowhead Stadium	54,610	Recap
14	December 10	at Green Bay Packers	**W** 21–3	7–6–1	Lambeau Field	56,694	Recap
15	December 17	**San Diego Chargers**	**L** 13–20	7–7–1	Arrowhead Stadium	40,623	Recap
16	December 24	at Miami Dolphins	**W** 27–24	8–7–1	Joe Robbie Stadium	43,612	Recap
Note: Intra-division opponents are in **bold** text.

=== Game summaries ===
==== Week 1: at Denver Broncos ====
Week 1: Kansas City Chiefs at Denver Broncos – Game summary

Quarter	1	2	3	4	Total
Chiefs	0	10	3	7	**20**
**Broncos**	17	0	7	10	**34**

at Mile High Stadium, Denver, Colorado

- Date: September 10
- Game time: 3:00 p.m. CDT/2:00 p.m. MDT
- Game weather: Partly Cloudy, 64 °F (18 °C)
- Game attendance: 74,284
- Referee: Red Cashion
- TV announcers (NBC): Fred Roggin and Lyle Alzado
- Recap, Game Book

Game information

**First quarter**

- DEN – David Treadwell 41-yard field goal, 8:49. Broncos 3–0. **Drive: 11 plays, 42 yards, 6:11.**
- DEN – Tyrone Braxton 34-yard interception return (David Treadwell kick), 8:31. Broncos 10–0.
- DEN – Sammy Winder 2-yard run (David Treadwell kick), 6:30. Broncos 17–0. **Drive: 3 plays, 8 yards, 1:43.**

**Second quarter**

- KC – Nick Lowery 41-yard field goal, 14:07. Broncos 17–3. **Drive: 12 plays, 57 yards, 7:23.**
- KC – Kenny Gamble 1-yard run (Nick Lowery kick), 0:26. Broncos 17–10. **Drive: 9 plays, 66 yards, 3:03.**

**Third quarter**

- KC – Nick Lowery 23-yard field goal, 6:43. Broncos 17–13. **Drive: 8 plays, 32 yards, 4:49.**
- DEN – Steve Sewell 9-yard pass from John Elway (David Treadwell kick), 1:47 Broncos 24–13. **Drive: 10 plays, 72 yards, 4:56.**

**Fourth quarter**

- DEN – David Treadwell 29-yard field goal, 12:02. Broncos 27–13. **Drive: 7 plays, 18 yards, 3:02.**
- KC – Carlos Carson 5-yard pass from Steve DeBerg (Nick Lowery kick), 7:53. Broncos 27–20. **Drive: 8 plays, 78 yards, 4:09.**
- DEN – Randy Robbins 18-yard interception return (David Treadwell kick), 3:11. Broncos 34–20.

**Top passers**

- KC – Steve DeBerg – 21/34, 250 yards, TD, 2 INT
- DEN – John Elway – 16/28, 150 yards, TD, 2 INT

**Top rushers**

- KC – Herman Heard – 9 rushes, 27 yards
- DEN – Sammy Winder – 11 rushes, 38 yards, TD

**Top receivers**

- KC – Emile Harry – 4 receptions, 69 yards
- DEN – Jeff Alexander – 3 receptions, 35 yards

==== Week 2: vs. Los Angeles Raiders ====
Week 2: Los Angeles Raiders at Kansas City Chiefs – Game summary

Quarter	1	2	3	4	Total
Raiders	6	10	3	0	**19**
**Chiefs**	7	10	0	7	**24**

at Arrowhead Stadium, Kansas City, Missouri

- Date: September 17
- Game time: 12:00 p.m. CDT
- Game weather: Clear and Sunny, 75 °F (24 °C)
- Game attendance: 71,741
- Referee: Jerry Seeman
- TV announcers (NBC): Charlie Jones and Merlin Olsen
- Recap, Game Book

Game information

**First quarter**

- RAI – Mervyn Fernandez 25-yard pass from Jay Schroeder (kick aborted), 7:14. Raiders 6–0. **Drive: 8 plays, 71 yards, 4:31.**
- KC – Chris Dressel 49-yard pass from Steve DeBerg (Nick Lowery kick), 4:04. Chiefs 7–6. **Drive: 5 plays, 80 yards, 3:04.**

**Second quarter**

- RAI – Trey Junkin 3-yard pass from Jay Schroeder (Jeff Jaeger kick), 13:28. Raiders 13–7. **Drive: 10 plays, 69 yards, 5:21.**
- KC – Nick Lowery 47-yard field goal, 10:02. Raiders 13–10. **Drive: 6 plays, 38 yards, 4:58.**
- RAI – Jeff Jaeger 39-yard field goal, 4:58. Raiders 16–10. **Drive: 10 plays, 55 yards, 4:54.**
- KC – Christian Okoye 8-yard run (Nick Lowery kick), 0:59. Chiefs 17–16. **Drive: 12 plays, 80 yards, 3:53.**

**Third quarter**

- RAI – Jeff Jaeger 40-yard field goal, 10:03. Raiders 19–17. **Drive: 11 plays, 28 yards, 4:57.**

**Fourth quarter**

- KC – Christian Okoye 1-yard run (Nick Lowery kick), 7:51. Chiefs 24–19. **Drive: 9 plays, 87 yards, 4:00.**

**Top passers**

- RAI – Jay Schroeder – 14/21, 192 yards, 2 TD, INT
- KC – Steve DeBerg – 12/18, 171 yards, TD, INT

**Top rushers**

- RAI – Marcus Allen – 18 rushes, 58 yards
- KC – Christian Okoye – 27 rushes, 95 yards, 2 TD

**Top receivers**

- RAI – Marcus Allen – 3 receptions, 44 yards
- KC – Chris Dressel – 3 receptions, 65 yards, TD

==== Week 3: at San Diego Chargers ====
Week 3: Kansas City Chiefs at San Diego Chargers – Game summary

Quarter	1	2	3	4	Total
Chiefs	3	3	0	0	**6**
**Chargers**	7	0	7	7	**21**

at Jack Murphy Stadium, San Diego, California

- Date: September 24
- Game time: 3:00 p.m. CDT/1:00 p.m. PDT
- Game weather: Cloudy and Sunny, 77 °F (25 °C)
- Game attendance: 40,128
- Referee: Ben Dreith
- TV announcers (NBC): Tom Hammond and Joe Namath
- Recap, Game Book

Game information

**First quarter**

- SD – Tim Spencer 9-yard run (Chris Bahr kick), 3:57. Chargers 7–0. **Drive: 2 plays, 17 yards, 0:46.**
- KC – Nick Lowery 23-yard field goal, 0:23. Chargers 7–3. **Drive: 9 plays, 76 yards, 3:34.**

**Second quarter**

- KC – Nick Lowery 31-yard field goal, 1:04. Chargers 7–6. **Drive: 9 plays, 46 yards, 5:43.**

**Third quarter**

- SD – Rod Bernstine 1-yard pass from Jim McMahon (Chris Bahr kick), 8:05. Chargers 14–6. **Drive: 11 plays, 74 yards, 6:55.**

**Fourth quarter**

- SD – Rod Bernstine 32-yard run (Chris Bahr kick), 3:31. Chargers 21–6. **Drive: 8 plays, 78 yards, 5:13.**

**Top passers**

- KC – Steve DeBerg – 16/28, 177 yards, 5 INT
- SD – Jim McMahon – 11/18, 96 yards, TD

**Top rushers**

- KC – Christian Okoye – 16 rushes, 112 yards
- SD – Rod Bernstine – 5 rushes, 73 yards, TD

**Top receivers**

- KC – Todd McNair – 7 receptions, 83 yards
- SD – Anthony Miller – 2 receptions, 55 yards

==== Week 4: vs. Cincinnati Bengals ====
Week 4: Cincinnati Bengals at Kansas City Chiefs – Game summary

Quarter	1	2	3	4	Total
**Bengals**	0	14	0	7	**21**
Chiefs	3	14	0	0	**17**

at Arrowhead Stadium, Kansas City, Missouri

- Date: October 1
- Game time: 12:00 p.m. CDT
- Game weather: Clear, 78 °F (26 °C)
- Game attendance: 61,165
- Referee: Gordon McCarter
- TV announcers (NBC): Tom Hammond and Joe Namath
- Recap

Game information

**First quarter**

- KC – Nick Lowery 23-yard field goal, 7:32. Chiefs 3–0. **Drive: 4 plays, 5 yards, 1:32.**

**Second quarter**

- KC – Christian Okoye 8-yard run (Nick Lowery kick), 13:17. Chiefs 10–0. **Drive: 10 plays, 65 yards, 7:25.**
- CIN – Tim McGee 40-yard pass from Boomer Esiason (Jim Gallery kick), 10:39. Chiefs 10–7. **Drive: 4 plays, 69 yards, 2:38.**
- KC – Robb Thomas 5-yard pass from Ron Jaworski (Nick Lowery kick), 3:27. Chiefs 17–7. **Drive: 6 plays, 26 yards, 2:49.**
- CIN – Eric Ball 2-yard run (Jim Gallery kick), 1:02. Chiefs 17–14. **Drive: 6 plays, 75 yards, 2:25.**

**Third quarter**

- No scoring plays.

**Fourth quarter**

- CIN – Leon White 22-yard fumble return (Jim Gallery kick), 13:11. Bengals 21–17.

**Top passers**

- CIN – Boomer Esiason – 6/14, 152 yards, TD, INT
- KC – Ron Jaworski – 14/28, 163 yards, TD, 4 INT

**Top rushers**

- CIN – Eric Ball – 16 rushes, 71 yards, TD
- KC – Christian Okoye – 25 rushes, 101 yards, TD

**Top receivers**

- CIN – Rodney Holman – 2 receptions, 45 yards
- KC – Stephone Paige – 3 receptions, 56 yards

==== Week 5: at Seattle Seahawks ====
Week 5: Kansas City Chiefs at Seattle Seahawks – Game summary

Quarter	1	2	3	4	Total
Chiefs	3	0	7	10	**20**
**Seahawks**	7	9	0	0	**16**

at Kingdome, Seattle, Washington

- Date: October 8
- Game time: 3:00 p.m. CDT/1:00 p.m. PDT
- Game weather: None (indoor stadium)
- Game attendance: 60,715
- Referee: Dick Hantak
- TV announcers (NBC): Don Criqui and Ahmad Rashad
- Recap, Game Book

Game information

**First quarter**

- SEA – James Jefferson 97-yard kickoff return (Norm Johnson kick), 14:43. Seahawks 7–0.
- KC – Nick Lowery 39-yard field goal, 4:29. Seahawks 7–3. **Drive: 8 plays, 29 yards, 5:03.**

**Second quarter**

- SEA – Norm Johnson 37-yard field goal, 5:03. Seahawks 10–3. **Drive: 6 plays, 32 yards, 2:44.**
- SEA – Norm Johnson 26-yard field goal, 1:49. Seahawks 13–3. **Drive: 7 plays, 47 yards, 2:00.**
- SEA – Norm Johnson 37-yard field goal, 0:04. Seahawks 16–3. **Drive: 5 plays, 35 yards, 0:36.**

**Third quarter**

- KC – Christian Okoye 13-yard run (Nick Lowery kick), 7:53. Seahawks 16–10. **Drive: 11 plays, 80 yards, 6:59.**

**Fourth quarter**

- KC – Nick Lowery 25-yard field goal, 11:52. Seahawks 16–13. **Drive: 11 plays, 59 yards, 7:15.**
- KC – Alfredo Roberts 2-yard pass from Ron Jaworski (Nick Lowery kick), 9:27. Chiefs 20–16. **Drive: 5 plays, 11 yards, 2:07.**

**Top passers**

- KC – Ron Jaworski – 12/18, 104 yards, TD
- SEA – Dave Krieg – 20/36, 252 yards, 2 INT

**Top rushers**

- KC – Christian Okoye – 30 rushes, 156 yards, TD
- SEA – Dave Krieg – 3 rushes, 29 yards

**Top receivers**

- KC – Emile Harry – 3 receptions, 41 yards
- SEA – Brian Blades – 4 receptions, 86 yards

==== Week 6: at Los Angeles Raiders ====
Week 6: Kansas City Chiefs at Los Angeles Raiders – Game summary

Quarter	1	2	3	4	Total
Chiefs	7	0	0	7	**14**
**Raiders**	3	7	3	7	**20**

at Los Angeles Memorial Coliseum, Los Angeles, California

- Date: October 15
- Game time: 3:00 p.m. CDT/1:00 p.m. PDT
- Game weather: Hazy, 70 °F (21 °C)
- Game attendance: 40,453
- Referee: Howard Roe
- TV announcers (NBC): Tom Hammond and Joe Namath
- Recap, Game Book

Game information

**First quarter**

- KC – Christian Okoye 2-yard run (Nick Lowery kick), 8:59. Chiefs 7–0. **Drive: 8 plays, 57 yards, 4:47.**
- RAI – Jeff Jaeger 24-yard field goal, 2:21. Chiefs 7–3. **Drive: 12 plays, 72 yards, 6:38.**

**Second quarter**

- RAI – Bo Jackson 2-yard run (Jeff Jaeger kick), 0:56. Raiders 10–7. **Drive: 12 plays, 51 yards, 6:13.**

**Third quarter**

- RAI – Jeff Jaeger 50-yard field goal, 10:13. Raiders 13–7. **Drive: 5 plays, 6 yards, 2:12.**

**Fourth quarter**

- RAI – Vance Mueller 6-yard run (Jeff Jaeger kick), 11:18. Raiders 20–7. **Drive: 5 plays, 70 yards, 3:19.**
- KC – Robb Thomas 2-yard pass from Steve DeBerg (Nick Lowery kick), 0:19. Raiders 20–14. **Drive: 8 plays, 70 yards, 1:10.**

**Top passers**

- KC – Ron Jaworski – 10/15, 118 yards, INT
- RAI – Jay Schroeder – 5/16, 87 yards, INT

**Top rushers**

- KC – Christian Okoye – 18 rushes, 52 yards, TD
- RAI – Bo Jackson – 11 rushes, 85 yards, TD

**Top receivers**

- KC – Herman Heard – 9 receptions, 90 yards
- RAI – Mike Dyal – 2 receptions, 50 yards

==== Week 7: vs. Dallas Cowboys ====
Week 7: Dallas Cowboys at Kansas City Chiefs – Game summary

Quarter	1	2	3	4	Total
Cowboys	7	7	0	14	**28**
**Chiefs**	14	13	9	0	**36**

at Arrowhead Stadium, Kansas City, Missouri

- Date: October 22
- Game time: 12:00 p.m. CDT
- Game weather: Clear, 63 °F (17 °C)
- Game attendance: 76,841
- Referee: Jim Tunney
- TV announcers (CBS): Tim Brant and Dan Jiggetts
- Recap

Game information

**First quarter**

- KC – Christian Okoye 2-yard run (Nick Lowery kick), 8:17. Chiefs 7–0. **Drive: 8 plays, 61 yards, 4:57.**
- DAL – Paul Palmer 63-yard run (Roger Ruzek kick), 6:20. Tied 7–7. **Drive: 3 plays, 72 yards, 1:57.**
- KC – Christian Okoye 13-yard run (Nick Lowery kick), 0:36. Chiefs 14–7. **Drive: 10 plays, 80 yards, 5:44.**

**Second quarter**

- KC – James Saxon 4-yard run (Nick Lowery kick), 10:13. Chiefs 21–7. **Drive: 6 plays, 49 yards, 2:54.**
- DAL – James Dixon 97-yard kickoff return (Roger Ruzek kick), 9:57. Chiefs 21–14.
- KC – Nick Lowery 43-yard field goal, 1:56. Chiefs 24–14. **Drive: 8 plays, 54 yards, 3:10.**
- KC – Nick Lowery 27-yard field goal, 0:03. Chiefs 27–14. **Drive: 8 plays, 63 yards, 1:04.**

**Third quarter**

- KC – Punt blocked by Rob McGovern out of bounds in end zone for a Safety, 10:52. Chiefs 29–14.
- KC – Steve Pelluer 5-yard run (Nick Lowery kick), 2:21. Chiefs 36–14. **Drive: 8 plays, 42 yards, 5:00.**

**Fourth quarter**

- DAL – Darryl Clack 1-yard run (Roger Ruzek kick), 10:15. Chiefs 36–21. **Drive: 11 plays, 71 yards, 7:06.**
- DAL – Steve Folsom 4-yard pass from Steve Walsh (Roger Ruzek kick), 3:48. Chiefs 36–28. **Drive: 11 plays, 80 yards, 3:33.**

**Top passers**

- DAL – Steve Walsh – 14/29, 166 yards, TD
- KC – Steve DeBerg – 17/22, 237 yards

**Top rushers**

- DAL – Paul Palmer – 9 rushes, 85 yards, TD
- KC – Christian Okoye – 33 rushes, 170 yards, 2 TD

**Top receivers**

- DAL – Kelvin Martin – 4 receptions, 52 yards
- KC – Emile Harry – 3 receptions, 64 yards

==== Week 8: at Pittsburgh Steelers ====
Week 8: Kansas City Chiefs at Pittsburgh Steelers – Game summary

Quarter	1	2	3	4	Total
Chiefs	0	3	14	0	**17**
**Steelers**	10	6	7	0	**23**

at Three Rivers Stadium, Pittsburgh, Pennsylvania

- Date: October 29
- Game time: 1:00 p.m. EST/12:00 p.m. CST
- Game weather: Sunny, 73 °F (23 °C)
- Game attendance: 54,154
- Referee: Tom Dooley
- TV announcers (NBC): Joel Meyers and Paul Maguire
- Recap, Game Book

Game information

**First quarter**

- PIT – Gary Anderson 41-yard field goal, 10:36. Steelers 3–0. **Drive: 10 plays, 41 yards, 4:24.**
- PIT – Louis Lipps 16-yard pass from Bubby Brister (Gary Anderson kick), 4:41. Steelers 10–0. **Drive: 10 plays, 75 yards, 3:57.**

**Second quarter**

- PIT – Gary Anderson 47-yard field goal, 7:07. Steelers 13–0. **Drive: 11 plays, 40 yards, 6:12.**
- PIT – Gary Anderson 29-yard field goal, 0:24. Steelers 16–0. **Drive: 12 plays, 68 yards, 2:03.**
- KC – Nick Lowery 50-yard field goal, 0:00. Steelers 16–3. **Drive: 3 plays, 44 yards, 0:24.**

**Third quarter**

- KC – Pete Mandley 8-yard pass from Steve DeBerg (Nick Lowery kick), 11:01. Steelers 16–10. **Drive: 9 plays, 80 yards, 3:59.**
- KC – Bill Maas 4-yard fumble return (Nick Lowery kick), 3:51. Chiefs 17–16.
- PIT – Louis Lipps 64-yard pass from Bubby Brister (Gary Anderson kick), 0:10. Steelers 23–17. **Drive: 1 play, 64 yards, 0:14.**

**Fourth quarter**

- No scoring plays.

**Top passers**

- KC – Steve DeBerg – 24/36, 338 yards, TD, 2 INT
- PIT – Bubby Brister – 17/27, 253 yards, 2 TD

**Top rushers**

- KC – Christian Okoye – 23 rushes, 101 yards
- PIT – Merril Hoge – 15 rushes, 65 yards

**Top receivers**

- KC – Stephone Paige – 7 receptions, 163 yards
- PIT – Louis Lipps – 7 receptions, 130 yards, 2 TD

==== Week 9: vs. Seattle Seahawks ====
Week 9: Seattle Seahawks at Kansas City Chiefs – Game summary

Quarter	1	2	3	4	Total
Seahawks	7	3	0	0	**10**
**Chiefs**	7	10	0	3	**20**

at Arrowhead Stadium, Kansas City, Missouri

- Date: November 5
- Game time: 12:00 p.m. CST
- Game weather: Clear, 63 °F (17 °C)
- Game attendance: 54,489
- Referee: Ben Dreith
- TV announcers (NBC): Jim Donovan and Jim Laslavic
- Recap, Game Book

Game information

**First quarter**

- SEA – Nesby Glasgow 38-yard fumble return (Norm Johnson kick), 13:50. Seahawks 7–0.
- KC – Christian Okoye 8-yard run (Nick Lowery kick), 8:51. Tied 7–7. **Drive: 9 plays, 81 yards, 4:50.**

**Second quarter**

- KC – Steve Pelluer 10-yard run (Nick Lowery kick), 11:49. Chiefs 14–7. **Drive: 14 plays, 80 yards, 8:37.**
- KC – Nick Lowery 34-yard field goal, 4:33. Chiefs 17–7. **Drive: 10 plays, 15 yards, 5:06.**
- SEA – Norm Johnson 18-yard field goal, 0:15. Chiefs 17–10. **Drive: 16 plays, 79 yards, 4:11.**

**Third quarter**

- No scoring plays.

**Fourth quarter**

- KC – Nick Lowery 33-yard field goal, 5:37. Chiefs 20–10. **Drive: 6 plays, 17 yards, 2:59.**

**Top passers**

- SEA – Dave Krieg – 14/32, 126 yards
- KC – Steve Pelluer – 7/13, 80 yards

**Top rushers**

- SEA – John Williams – 6 rushes, 28 yards
- KC – Christian Okoye – 37 rushes, 126 yards, TD

**Top receivers**

- SEA – Steve Largent – 3 receptions, 47 yards
- KC – Jonathan Hayes – 1 reception, 20 yards

==== Week 10: vs. Denver Broncos ====
Week 10: Denver Broncos at Kansas City Chiefs – Game summary

Quarter	1	2	3	4	Total
**Broncos**	3	7	3	3	**16**
Chiefs	0	6	0	7	**13**

at Arrowhead Stadium, Kansas City, Missouri

- Date: November 12
- Game time: 12:00 p.m. CST
- Game weather: Clear, 57 °F (14 °C)
- Game attendance: 76,245
- Referee: Ben Dreith
- TV announcers (NBC): Dick Enberg and Bill Walsh
- Recap, Game Book

Game information

**First quarter**

- DEN – David Treadwell 18-yard field goal, 9:53. Broncos 3–0. **Drive: 9 plays, 29 yards, 4:43.**

**Second quarter**

- KC – Nick Lowery 39-yard field goal, 14:25. Tied 3–3. **Drive: 12 plays, 60 yards, 4:33.**
- DEN – Greg Kragen 17-yard fumble return (David Treadwell kick), 11:45. Broncos 10–3.
- KC – Nick Lowery 42-yard field goal, 0:12. Broncos 10–6. **Drive: 8 plays, 39 yards, 1:41.**

**Third quarter**

- DEN – David Treadwell 27-yard field goal, 6:47. Broncos 13–6. **Drive: 7 plays, 24 yards, 3:43.**

**Fourth quarter**

- KC – Emile Harry 5-yard pass from Steve Pelluer (Nick Lowery kick), 5:36. Tied 13–13. **Drive: 10 plays, 41 yards, 3:47.**
- DEN – David Treadwell 26-yard field goal, 0:01. Broncos 16–13. **Drive: 10 plays, 71 yards, 5:23.**

**Top passers**

- DEN – John Elway – 11/22, 133 yards, INT
- KC – Steve Pelluer – 7/13, 80 yards

**Top rushers**

- DEN – Bobby Humphrey – 21 rushes, 77 yards
- KC – James Saxon – 18 rushes, 57 yards

**Top receivers**

- DEN – Steve Sewell – 5 receptions, 84 yards
- KC – Stephone Paige – 2 receptions, 48 yards

==== Week 11: at Cleveland Browns ====
Week 11: Kansas City Chiefs at Cleveland Browns – Game summary

Quarter	1	2	3	4	OT	Total
Chiefs	0	0	7	3	0	**10**
Browns	0	3	7	0	0	**10**

at Cleveland Municipal Stadium, Cleveland, Ohio

- Date: November 19
- Game time: 1:00 p.m. EST/12:00 p.m. CST
- Game weather: Cloudy, 35 °F (2 °C)
- Game attendance: 77,922
- Referee: Pat Haggerty
- TV announcers (NBC): Dick Enberg and Bill Walsh
- Recap, Game Book

Game information

**First quarter**

- No scoring plays.

**Second quarter**

- CLE – Matt Bahr 40-yard field goal, 0:00. Browns 3–0. **Drive: 5 plays, 25 yards, 0:41.**

**Third quarter**

- KC – Neil Smith 4-yard fumble return (Nick Lowery kick), 14:39. Chiefs 7–3.
- CLE – Eric Metcalf 1-yard run (Matt Bahr kick), 3:51. Browns 10–7. **Drive: 7 plays, 48 yards, 3:57.**

**Fourth quarter**

- KC – Nick Lowery 41-yard field goal, 3:48. Tied 10–10. **Drive: 8 plays, 16 yards, 3:29.**

**Overtime**

- No scoring plays.

**Top passers**

- KC – Steve DeBerg – 17/40, 209 yards, 2 INT
- CLE – Bernie Kosar – 21/42, 198 yards, INT

**Top rushers**

- KC – Christian Okoye – 21 rushes, 40 yards
- CLE – Eric Metcalf – 23 rushes, 49 yards, TD

**Top receivers**

- KC – Pete Mandley – 4 receptions, 56 yards
- CLE – Webster Slaughter – 6 receptions, 67 yards

==== Week 12: vs. Houston Oilers ====
Week 12: Houston Oilers at Kansas City Chiefs – Game summary

Quarter	1	2	3	4	Total
Oilers	0	0	0	0	**0**
**Chiefs**	10	10	7	7	**34**

at Arrowhead Stadium, Kansas City, Missouri

- Date: November 26
- Game time: 12:00 p.m. CST
- Game weather: Clear, 55 °F (13 °C)
- Game attendance: 51,342
- Referee: Fred Wyant
- TV announcers (NBC): Jim Donovan and Jimmy Cefalo
- Recap, Game Book

Game information

**First quarter**

- KC – Nick Lowery 31-yard field goal, 11:52. Chiefs 3–0. **Drive: 7 plays, 64 yards, 2:59.**
- KC – James Saxon 4-yard run (Nick Lowery kick), 1:06. Chiefs 10–0. **Drive: 2 plays, 8 yards, 0:45.**

**Second quarter**

- KC – Nick Lowery 34-yard field goal, 6:09. Chiefs 13–0. **Drive: 11 plays, 44 yards, 5:02.**
- KC – J. C. Pearson 1-yard return of blocked punt (Nick Lowery kick), 4:16. Chiefs 20–0.

**Third quarter**

- KC – Jonathan Hayes 7-yard pass from Steve DeBerg (Nick Lowery kick), 6:43. Chiefs 27–0. **Drive: 6 plays, 51 yards, 2:03.**

**Fourth quarter**

- KC – Christian Okoye 17-yard run (Nick Lowery kick), 14:07. Chiefs 34–0. **Drive: 9 plays, 71 yards, 4:45.**

**Top passers**

- HOU – Warren Moon – 8/20, 99 yards, INT
- KC – Steve DeBerg – 15/25, 224 yards, TD

**Top rushers**

- HOU – Alonzo Highsmith – 8 rushes, 24 yards
- KC – Christian Okoye – 21 rushes, 67 yards, TD

**Top receivers**

- HOU – Leonard Harris – 4 receptions, 49 yards
- KC – Stephone Paige – 7 receptions, 114 yards

==== Week 13: vs. Miami Dolphins ====
Week 13: Miami Dolphins at Kansas City Chiefs – Game summary

Quarter	1	2	3	4	Total
Dolphins	0	0	7	14	**21**
**Chiefs**	13	3	3	7	**26**

at Arrowhead Stadium, Kansas City, Missouri

- Date: December 3
- Game time: 12:00 p.m. CST
- Game weather: Clear, 23 °F (−5 °C)
- Game attendance: 54,610
- Referee: Red Cashion
- TV announcers (NBC): Charlie Jones and Merlin Olsen
- Recap, Game Book

Game information

**First quarter**

- KC – Christian Okoye 3-yard run (kick failed, wide left), 8:06. Chiefs 6–0. **Drive: 8 plays, 80 yards, 4:40.**
- KC – Stephone Paige 38-yard pass from Steve DeBerg (Nick Lowery kick), 3:01. Chiefs 13–0. **Drive: 2 plays, 57 yards, 0:52.**

**Second quarter**

- KC – Nick Lowery 34-yard field goal, 0:15. Chiefs 16–0. **Drive: 15 plays, 68 yards, 8:45.**

**Third quarter**

- MIA – Jim Jensen 8-yard pass from Dan Marino (Pete Stoyanovich kick), 9:31. Chiefs 16–7. **Drive: 10 plays, 78 yards, 5:20.**
- KC – Nick Lowery 28-yard field goal, 3:07. Chiefs 19–7. **Drive: 12 plays, 73 yards, 6:15.**

**Fourth quarter**

- MIA – Mark Clayton 15-yard pass from Dan Marino (Pete Stoyanovich kick), 10:37. Chiefs 19–14. **Drive: 8 plays, 51 yards, 4:09.**
- KC – Herman Heard 8-yard pass from Steve DeBerg (Nick Lowery kick), 5:00. Chiefs 26–14. **Drive: 8 plays, 75 yards, 5:26.**
- MIA – Jim Jensen 9-yard pass from Dan Marino (Pete Stoyanovich kick), 0:53. Chiefs 26–21. **Drive: 16 plays, 80 yards, 4:03.**

**Top passers**

- MIA – Dan Marino – 18/37, 218 yards, 3 TD, INT
- KC – Steve DeBerg – 15/25, 239 yards, 2 TD, INT

**Top rushers**

- MIA – Sammie Smith – 14 rushes, 49 yards
- KC – Christian Okoye – 32 rushes, 148 yards, TD

**Top receivers**

- MIA – Mark Clayton – 9 receptions, 128 yards, TD
- KC – Stephone Paige – 7 receptions, 133 yards, TD

==== Week 14: at Green Bay Packers ====
Week 14: Kansas City Chiefs at Green Bay Packers – Game summary

Quarter	1	2	3	4	Total
**Chiefs**	0	21	0	0	**21**
Packers	0	3	0	0	**3**

at Lambeau Field, Green Bay, Wisconsin

- Date: December 10
- Game time: 12:00 p.m. CST
- Game weather: Cloudy, 23 °F (−5 °C)
- Game attendance: 56,694
- Referee: Jim Tunney
- TV announcers (NBC): Jim Donovan and Jimmy Cefalo
- Recap, Game Book

Game information

**First quarter**

- No scoring plays.

**Second quarter**

- KC – Jonathan Hayes 7-yard pass from Steve DeBerg (Nick Lowery kick), 14:55. Chiefs 7–0. **Drive: 10 plays, 65 yards, 5:52.**
- GB – Chris Jacke 25-yard field goal, 3:57. Chiefs 7–3. **Drive: 10 plays, 56 yards, 5:52.**
- KC – Christian Okoye 3-yard run (Nick Lowery kick), 1:01. Chiefs 14–3. **Drive: 6 plays, 78 yards, 2:56.**
- KC – Emile Harry 12-yard pass from Steve DeBerg (Nick Lowery kick), 0:07. Chiefs 21–3. **Drive: 3 plays, 15 yards, 0:36.**

**Third quarter**

- No scoring plays.

**Fourth quarter**

- No scoring plays.

**Top passers**

- KC – Steve DeBerg – 15/19, 203 yards, 2 TD
- GB – Don Majkowski – 14/34, 123 yards, INT

**Top rushers**

- KC – Christian Okoye – 38 rushes, 131 yards, TD
- GB – Brent Fullwood – 10 rushes, 39 yards

**Top receivers**

- KC – Jonathan Hayes – 4 receptions, 53 yards, TD
- GB – Perry Kemp – 3 receptions, 29 yards

==== Week 15: vs. San Diego Chargers ====
Week 15: San Diego Chargers at Kansas City Chiefs – Game summary

Quarter	1	2	3	4	Total
**Chargers**	0	7	3	10	**20**
Chiefs	0	13	0	0	**13**

at Arrowhead Stadium, Kansas City, Missouri

- Date: December 17
- Game time: 12:00 p.m. CST
- Game weather: Mostly Sunny, 18 °F (−8 °C)
- Game attendance: 40,623
- Referee: Jerry Seeman
- TV announcers (NBC): Joel Meyers and Paul Maguire
- Recap, Game Book

Game information

**First quarter**

- No scoring plays.

**Second quarter**

- KC – Nick Lowery 36-yard field goal, 10:20. Chiefs 3–0. **Drive: 7 plays, 22 yards, 2:01.**
- KC – Nick Lowery 30-yard field goal, 5:40. Chiefs 6–0. **Drive: 4 plays, 4 yards, 2:14.**
- KC – Todd McNair 11-yard pass from Steve DeBerg (Nick Lowery kick), 1:45. Chiefs 13–0. **Drive: 5 plays, 76 yards, 0:49.**
- SD – Andy Parker 1-yard pass from Billy Joe Tolliver (Chris Bahr kick), 0:17. Chiefs 13–7. **Drive: 8 plays, 68 yards, 1:23.**

**Third quarter**

- SD – Chris Bahr 43-yard field goal, 6:26. Chiefs 13–10. **Drive: 11 plays, 61 yards, 5:18.**

**Fourth quarter**

- SD – Anthony Miller 5-yard pass from Billy Joe Tolliver (Chris Bahr kick), 14:56. Chargers 17–13. **Drive: 9 plays, 80 yards, 3:03.**
- SD – Chris Bahr 20-yard field goal, 8:41. Chargers 20–13. **Drive: 9 plays, 44 yards, 5:17.**

**Top passers**

- SD – Billy Joe Tolliver – 13/30, 171 yards, 2 TD, INT
- KC – Steve DeBerg – 14/33, 142 yards, TD, 2 INT

**Top rushers**

- SD – Marion Butts – 39 rushes, 176 yards
- KC – Christian Okoye – 18 rushes, 60 yards

**Top receivers**

- SD – Anthony Miller – 5 receptions, 93 yards, TD
- KC – Stephone Paige – 4 receptions, 42 yards

==== Week 16: at Miami Dolphins ====
Week 16: Kansas City Chiefs at Miami Dolphins – Game summary

Quarter	1	2	3	4	Total
**Chiefs**	0	21	3	3	**27**
Dolphins	7	7	0	10	**24**

at Joe Robbie Stadium, Miami, Florida

- Date: December 24
- Game time: 1:00 p.m. EST/12:00 p.m. CST
- Game weather: Clear, 40 °F (4 °C)
- Game attendance: 43,612
- Referee: Johnny Grier
- TV announcers (NBC): Tom Hammond and Joe Namath
- Recap, Game Book

Game information

**First quarter**

- MIA – Jim Jensen 4-yard pass from Dan Marino (Pete Stoyanovich kick), 4:13. Dolphins 7–0. **Drive: 9 plays, 44 yards, 4:31.**

**Second quarter**

- KC – Stephone Paige 20-yard pass from Steve DeBerg (Nick Lowery kick), 14:55. Tied 7–7. **Drive: 9 plays, 71 yards, 4:18.**
- MIA – Ferrell Edmunds 3-yard pass from Dan Marino (Pete Stoyanovich kick), 10:05. Dolphins 14–7. **Drive: 10 plays, 91 yards, 4:50.**
- KC – James Saxon 6-yard run (Nick Lowery kick), 5:52. Tied 14–14. **Drive: 7 plays, 80 yards, 4:13.**
- KC – Christian Okoye 1-yard run (Nick Lowery kick), 1:39. Chiefs 21–14. **Drive: 6 plays, 39 yards, 2:24.**

**Third quarter**

- KC – Nick Lowery 19-yard field goal, 1:45. Chiefs 24–14. **Drive: 12 plays, 61 yards, 7:13.**

**Fourth quarter**

- MIA – Pete Stoyanovich 22-yard field goal, 10:44. Chiefs 24–17. **Drive: 13 plays, 61 yards, 6:01.**
- MIA – Mark Clayton 7-yard pass from Dan Marino (Pete Stoyanovich kick), 4:24. Tied 24–24. **Drive: 5 plays, 57 yards, 2:23.**
- KC – Nick Lowery 41-yard field goal, 1:31. Chiefs 27–24. **Drive: 9 plays, 44 yards, 2:53.**

**Top passers**

- KC – Steve DeBerg – 17/26, 230 yards, TD, INT
- MIA – Dan Marino – 28/47, 339 yards, 3 TD, INT

**Top rushers**

- KC – Christian Okoye – 26 rushes, 98 yards, TD
- MIA – Sammie Smith – 14 rushes, 45 yards

**Top receivers**

- KC – Pete Mandley – 4 receptions, 63 yards
- MIA – Mark Clayton – 6 receptions, 102 yards

== Standings ==
AFC West
	W	L	T	PCT	DIV	CONF	PF	PA	STK
^{(1)} Denver Broncos	11	5	0	.688	6–2	9–3	362	226	L1
Kansas City Chiefs	8	7	1	.531	3–5	6–7–1	318	286	W1
Los Angeles Raiders	8	8	0	.500	3–5	6–6	315	297	L2
Seattle Seahawks	7	9	0	.438	4–4	7–5	241	327	L1
San Diego Chargers	6	10	0	.375	4–4	4–8	266	290	W2
