= 1990 Kansas City Chiefs season =

NFL team season

- Owner: Lamar Hunt
- General manager: Carl Peterson
- Head coach: Marty Schottenheimer
- Offensive coordinator: Joe Pendry
- Defensive coordinator: Bill Cowher
- Home stadium: Arrowhead Stadium

Results
- Record: 11–5
- Division place: 2nd AFC West
- Playoffs: Lost Wild Card Playoffs (at Dolphins) 16–17
- All-Pros: 5: T John Alt (2nd team); LB Derrick Thomas (1st team); CB Albert Lewis (1st team); CB Kevin Ross (2nd team); K Nick Lowery (1st team)
- Pro Bowlers: 4: LB Derrick Thomas; CB Kevin Ross; CB Albert Lewis; K Nick Lowery

The 1990 Kansas City Chiefs season was the franchise's 21st season in the National Football League, the 28th as the Kansas City Chiefs and the 31st overall. The team improved from an 8–7–1 record to an 11–5 record and Wild Card spot in the 1991 playoffs. In Marty Schottenheimer's first playoff appearance with the Chiefs, they lost to the Miami Dolphins 17–16 in the wild-card round. Starting with the home opener, the Chiefs began 19 consecutive seasons with every home game sold out. The streak was finally broken in the final home game of the 2009 Kansas City Chiefs season versus Cleveland.

== Season notes ==
The success of the 1989 season carried into 1990, and the Chiefs put together a successful season to return to the playoffs for only the second time since 1971. The season began on August 4 when Buck Buchanan, a key ingredient of the team's 1969 Super Bowl championship season was inducted into the Pro Football Hall of Fame.

On opening day, The Chiefs beat the Minnesota Vikings 24–21. On September 17, Stephone Paige catches 10 passes for 206 yards, but the Chiefs still lost to the Denver Broncos, 24–23 on Monday Night Football.

On October 14, Barry Word rushes for a team-record 200 yards against the Detroit Lions at Arrowhead. Kansas City won 43–24 to give the Chiefs a 4–2 record. Word would eventually gain 1,021 yards rushing for the season while Paige caught 65 passes for 1,021 yards. Quarterback Steve DeBerg had his best season ever as a Chief as he passed for 3,444 yards and 23 touchdowns.

On November 11, Derrick Thomas who would get 20 quarterback sacks for the year, sacked Seattle Seahawks quarterback Dave Krieg for an NFL-record seven sacks. On the game's last play, Derrick nearly had his 8th sack, but Krieg eluded him and threw a game-winning touchdown as the Seahawks won 17–16. Derrick Thomas later said, "The thing I most remember about that game, is the sack I didn't get, that's the one that still haunts me." His record of seven sacks in one game is now seen as one of NFL's most "unbreakable records".

On December 9, the Chiefs had two big fourth-down calls and scored two touchdowns. Chiefs coach Marty Schottenheimer let his team make two big plays that ultimately led to Kansas City's 31–20 win over the Denver Broncos, which clinched a playoff spot.

The first big play was a fourth-and-goal at the Denver 1-yard line, and Barry Word carried the ball into the end zone to give the Chiefs a 17–13 lead. The second fourth-down attempt resulted in a 27-yard touchdown pass from Steve DeBerg to Robb Thomas and put the game away in the fourth quarter. DeBerg passed for 254 yards and three touchdowns in the game. Kansas City trailed 13–10 at the half but scored 21 second-half points to take control of the game.

The win improved their record to 9–4 and control of the AFC West Race. However, the next week the Chiefs lost to Houston, putting the Raiders Back into First place. The Chiefs won their next game at San Diego to Clinch an AFC playoff spot. The Chiefs then defeated the Chicago Bears 21-19 to finish 11–5, the team's best record since 1971. The Raiders held onto first winning in the final week. Defense carried the Chiefs to the playoffs thanks to Pro Bowlers Derrick Thomas, Albert Lewis and Kevin Ross.

Next was the Miami Dolphins in the AFC Wild-Card Playoff Game, which the team led 16-3 but lost 17–16. Kicker Nick Lowery missed a 52-yard FG in the final seconds that would have won the game.

== Offseason ==
=== Draft ===
1990 Kansas City Chiefs draft
Round	Pick	Player	Position	College	Notes
1	13	Percy Snow	Linebacker	Michigan State	
2	40	Tim Grunhard *	Center	Notre Dame	
4	96	Fred Jones	Wide receiver	Grambling State	
5	124	Derrick Graham	Guard	Appalachian State	
5	127	Ken Hackemack	Offensive tackle	Texas	
6	152	Tom Sims	Defensive tackle	Pittsburgh	
7	180	Dave Szott *	Guard	Penn State	
9	235	Michael Owens	Running back	Syracuse	
10	263	Craig Hudson	Tight end	Wisconsin	
11	291	Ernest Thompson	Running back	Georgia Southern	
12	318	Tony Jeffery	Wide receiver	San Jose State	
Made roster * Made at least one Pro Bowl during career

=== Undrafted free agents ===
1990 undrafted free agents of note
Player	Position	College
Willie Davis	Wide receiver	Central Arkansas
Howard Huckaby	Wide Receiver	Florida A&M
Lee Johnson	Nose tackle	Missouri
Mike Kiselak	Guard	Maryland
Bren Lowery	Running back	Maryland
Lonnie Marts	Linebacker	Tulane
Sherrod Rainge	Safety	Penn State
Rich Schonewolf	Defensive tackle	Penn State

== Personnel ==
=== Staff ===
1990 Kansas City Chiefs staff
Front office: Founder – Lamar Hunt; Chairman of the Board – Jack Steadman; President/general manager/Chief Executive Officer – Carl Peterson; Assistant general manager – Dennis Thum; Director of player personnel – Whitey Dovell; Head coaches: Head coach – Marty Schottenheimer; Offensive coaches: Offensive coordinator – Joe Pendry; Running Backs – Bruce Arians; Wide receivers – Al Saunders; Offensive line – Howard Mudd; Offense/Tight Ends – Jim Erkenbeck	Defensive coaches: Defensive coordinator/Linebackers – Bill Cowher; Defensive line – Tom Pratt; Defensive backs – Tony Dungy; Special assistant/quality control – Darvin Wallis; Special teams coaches: Special teams – Kurt Schottenheimer; Strength and conditioning: Strength and conditioning – Dave Redding; Assistant Strength and Conditioning – Russ Ball

=== Roster ===
1990 Kansas City Chiefs roster
Quarterbacks (QB): 17 Steve DeBerg; 10 Mike Elkins; 11 Steve Pelluer; Running backs (RB): 43 Bill Jones; 48 Todd McNair; 35 Christian Okoye FB; 21 James Saxon; 23 Barry Word; Wide receivers (WR): 88 J. J. Birden PR; 86 Emile Harry; 80 Fred Jones KR; 83 Stephone Paige; 81 Robb Thomas; Tight ends (TE): 85 Jonathan Hayes; 87 Alfredo Roberts; 82 Danta Whitaker	Offensive linemen (OL): 76 John Alt T; 77 Rich Baldinger T; 75 Irv Eatman T; 61 Tim Grunhard C; 72 Dave Lutz G; 79 Dave Szott G; 53 Mike Webster C; 65 Frank Winters; Defensive linemen (DL): 99 Mike Bell DE; 98 Leonard Griffin DE; 63 Bill Maas DE; 69 Greg Meisner NT; 97 Dan Saleaumua NT; 90 Neil Smith DE	Linebackers (LB): 55 Louis Cooper OLB; 56 Dino Hackett ILB; 57 Chris Martin OLB; 50 Rob McGovern ILB; 59 Percy Snow ILB; 58 Derrick Thomas OLB; Defensive backs (DB): 34 Lloyd Burruss SS; 20 Deron Cherry FS; 25 Danny Copeland SS; 42 Jeff Donaldson FS; 29 Albert Lewis CB; 24 J. C. Pearson; 45 Stan Petry FS; 27 Kevin Porter SS; 31 Kevin Ross CB; Special teams (ST): 4 Bryan Barker P; 8 Nick Lowery K	Practice squad: 89 Willie Davis WR; 54 Tracy Simien LB; Reserve: 22 Kenny Gamble RB (IR); 74 Derrick Graham T (IR); 51 Lonnie Marts LB (IR); 52 Tracy Rogers LB (IR); 95 Tom Sims NT (IR); 32 Ernest Thompson RB (IR); 46 Charles Washington CB/S (IR); -- Rob Woods T (IR); 84 Naz Worthen WR (IR); 47 active, 9 inactive, 2 practice squad Rookies in italics

== Preseason ==
Week	Date	Opponent	Result	Record	Venue	Attendance	Recap
1	August 11	vs Los Angeles Rams	L 3–19	0–1	(West Germany) Olympiastadion (West Berlin)	55,429	Recap
2	August 18	New York Jets	L 0–20	0–2	Arrowhead Stadium	40,448	Recap
3	August 24	at Detroit Lions	L 21–35	0–3	Pontiac Silverdome	50,293	Recap
4	August 31	Green Bay Packers	W 27–14	1–3	Arrowhead Stadium	42,806	Recap

== Regular season ==
=== Schedule ===
Week	Date	Opponent	Result	Record	Venue	Attendance	Recap
1	September 9	Minnesota Vikings	**W** 24–21	1–0	Arrowhead Stadium	68,363	Recap
2	September 17	at **Denver Broncos**	**L** 23–24	1–1	Mile High Stadium	75,277	Recap
3	September 23	at Green Bay Packers	**W** 17–3	2–1	Lambeau Field	58,817	Recap
4	September 30	Cleveland Browns	**W** 34–0	3–1	Arrowhead Stadium	75,462	Recap
5	October 7	at Indianapolis Colts	**L** 19–23	3–2	Hoosier Dome	54,950	Recap
6	October 14	Detroit Lions	**W** 43–24	4–2	Arrowhead Stadium	74,312	Recap
7	October 21	at **Seattle Seahawks**	**L** 7–19	4–3	Kingdome	60,358	Recap
8	Bye						
9	November 4	**Los Angeles Raiders**	**W** 9–7	5–3	Arrowhead Stadium	70,951	Recap
10	November 11	**Seattle Seahawks**	**L** 16–17	5–4	Arrowhead Stadium	71,285	Recap
11	November 18	**San Diego Chargers**	**W** 27–10	6–4	Arrowhead Stadium	63,717	Recap
12	November 25	at **Los Angeles Raiders**	**W** 27–24	7–4	Los Angeles Memorial Coliseum	65,710	Recap
13	December 2	at New England Patriots	**W** 37–7	8–4	Foxboro Stadium	26,280	Recap
14	December 9	**Denver Broncos**	**W** 31–20	9–4	Arrowhead Stadium	74,347	Recap
15	December 16	Houston Oilers	**L** 10–27	9–5	Arrowhead Stadium	61,756	Recap
16	December 23	at **San Diego Chargers**	**W** 24–21	10–5	Jack Murphy Stadium	45,135	Recap
17	December 29	at Chicago Bears	**W** 21–10	11–5	Soldier Field	60,262	Recap
Note: Intra-division opponents are in **bold** text.

=== Game summaries ===
==== Week 1: vs. Minnesota Vikings ====
Week 1: Minnesota Vikings at Kansas City Chiefs – Game summary

Quarter	1	2	3	4	Total
Vikings	7	7	7	0	**21**
**Chiefs**	14	3	0	7	**24**

at Arrowhead Stadium, Kansas City, Missouri

- Date: September 9
- Game time: 12:00 p.m. CDT
- Game weather: Clear, 89 °F (32 °C)
- Game attendance: 68,363
- Referee: Howard Roe
- TV announcers (CBS): James Brown and Randy Cross
- Recap, Game Book

Game information

**First quarter**

- KC – Bill Jones 4-yard pass Steve DeBerg (Nick Lowery kick), 11:43. Chiefs 7–0. **Drive: 4 plays, 14 yards, 2:21.**
- KC – Todd McNair 22-yard pass Steve DeBerg (Nick Lowery kick), 8:31. Chiefs 14–0. **Drive: 3 plays, 29 yards, 1:28.**
- MIN – Herschel Walker 6-yard pass Wade Wilson (Donald Igwebuike kick), 3:11. Chiefs 14–7. **Drive: 9 plays, 76 yards, 5:20.**

**Second quarter**

- MIN – Steve Jordan 26-yard pass Wade Wilson (Donald Igwebuike kick), 8:20. Tied 14–14. **Drive: 7 plays, 78 yards, 3:52.**
- KC – Nick Lowery 43-yard field goal, 0:00. Chiefs 17–14. **Drive: 9 plays, 50 yards, 1:41.**

**Third quarter**

- MIN – Herschel Walker 8-yard pass Wade Wilson (Donald Igwebuike kick), 6:53. Vikings 21–17. **Drive: 12 plays, 89 yards, 6:10.**

**Fourth quarter**

- KC – Christian Okoye 2-yard run (Nick Lowery kick), 9:35. Chiefs 24–21. **Drive: 12 plays, 78 yards, 5:32.**

**Top passers**

- MIN – Wade Wilson – 18/36, 248 yards, 3 TD, INT
- KC – Steve DeBerg – 16/28, 196 yards, 2 TD

**Top rushers**

- MIN – Herschel Walker – 14 rushes, 68 yards
- KC – Christian Okoye – 28 rushes, 92 yards, TD

**Top receivers**

- MIN – Steve Jordan – 4 receptions, 90 yards, TD
- KC – Todd McNair – 6 receptions, 57 yards, TD

==== Week 2: at Denver Broncos ====
Week 2: Kansas City Chiefs at Denver Broncos – Game summary

Quarter	1	2	3	4	Total
Chiefs	3	6	0	14	**23**
**Broncos**	7	7	7	3	**24**

at Mile High Stadium, Denver, Colorado

- Date: September 17
- Game time: 8:00 p.m. CDT/7:00 p.m. MDT
- Game weather: Mostly Fair, 63 °F (17 °C)
- Game attendance: 75,277
- Referee: Jim Tunney
- TV announcers (ABC): Al Michaels, Frank Gifford and Dan Dierdorf
- Recap, Game Book

Game information

**First quarter**

- KC – Nick Lowery 39-yard field goal, 3:18. Chiefs 3–0. **Drive: 4 plays, 5 yards, 1:47.**
- DEN – Bobby Humphrey 37-yard run (David Treadwell kick), 0:48. Broncos 7–3. **Drive: 5 plays, 76 yards, 2:30.**

**Second quarter**

- KC – Nick Lowery 29-yard field goal, 11:33. Broncos 7–6. **Drive: 10 plays, 63 yards, 4:15.**
- DEN – Bobby Humphrey 6-yard run (David Treadwell kick), 7:07. Broncos 14–6. **Drive: 7 plays, 80 yards, 4:26.**
- KC – Nick Lowery 31-yard field goal, 0:04. Broncos 14–9. **Drive: 8 plays, 30 yards, 3:11.**

**Third quarter**

- DEN – John Elway 2-yard run (David Treadwell kick), 6:49. Broncos 21–9. **Drive: 10 plays, 65 yards, 5:03.**

**Fourth quarter**

- KC – Stephone Paige 16-yard pass from Steve DeBerg (Nick Lowery kick), 8:01. Broncos 21–16. **Drive: 3 plays, 17 yards, 1:44.**
- KC – Stephone Paige 83-yard pass from Steve DeBerg (Nick Lowery kick), 1:44. Chiefs 23–21. **Drive: 1 play, 79 yards, 0:12.**
- DEN – David Treadwell 22-yard field goal, 0:00. Broncos 24–23. **Drive: 10 plays, 79 yards, 1:44.**

**Top passers**

- KC – Steve DeBerg – 26/45, 395 yards, 2 TD
- DEN – John Elway – 14/30, 263 yards

**Top rushers**

- KC – Christian Okoye – 20 rushes, 69 yards
- DEN – Bobby Humphrey – 19 rushes, 132 yards, 2 TD

**Top receivers**

- KC – Stephone Paige – 10 receptions, 206 yards, 2 TD
- DEN – Vance Johnson – 6 receptions, 150 yards

==== Week 3: at Green Bay Packers ====
Week 3: Kansas City Chiefs at Green Bay Packers – Game summary

Quarter	1	2	3	4	Total
**Chiefs**	0	7	0	10	**17**
Packers	0	3	0	0	**3**

at Lambeau Field, Green Bay, Wisconsin

- Date: September 23
- Game time: 12:00 p.m. CDT
- Game weather: Partly Cloudy, 52 °F (11 °C)
- Game attendance: 58,817
- Referee: Gordon McCarter
- TV announcers (NBC): Joel Meyers and Ahmad Rashad
- Recap, Game Book

Game information

**First quarter**

- No scoring plays.

**Second quarter**

- GB – Chris Jacke 46-yard field goal, 5:51. Packers 3–0. **Drive: 13 plays, 57 yards, 9:09.**
- KC – Christian Okoye 5-yard run (Nick Lowery kick), 0:59. Chiefs 7–3. **Drive: 9 plays, 80 yards, 4:52.**

**Third quarter**

- No scoring plays.

**Fourth quarter**

- KC – Nick Lowery 20-yard field goal, 10:31. Chiefs 10–3. **Drive: 4 plays, 2 yards, 1:38.**
- KC – Stan Petry 33-yard interception return (Nick Lowery kick), 2:59. Chiefs 17–3.

**Top passers**

- KC – Steve DeBerg – 9/21, 127 yards
- GB – Don Majkowski – 19/31, 171 yards, 2 INT

**Top rushers**

- KC – Christian Okoye – 23 rushes, 122 yards, TD
- GB – Brent Fullwood – 13 rushes, 47 yards

**Top receivers**

- KC – Robb Thomas – 2 receptions, 38 yards
- GB – Herman Fontenot – 6 receptions, 60 yards

==== Week 4: vs. Cleveland Browns ====
Week 4: Cleveland Browns at Kansas City Chiefs – Game summary

Quarter	1	2	3	4	Total
Browns	0	0	0	0	**0**
**Chiefs**	7	17	10	0	**34**

at Arrowhead Stadium, Kansas City, Missouri

- Date: September 30
- Game time: 3:00 p.m. CDT
- Game weather: Clear, 68 °F (20 °C)
- Game attendance: 75,462
- Referee: Pat Haggerty
- TV announcers (NBC): Dick Enberg and Bill Walsh
- Recap, Game Book

Game information

**First quarter**

- KC – Robb Thomas 47-yard pass from Steve DeBerg (Nick Lowery kick), 3:30. Chiefs 7–0. **Drive: 3 plays, 58 yards, 1:25.**

**Second quarter**

- KC – Nick Lowery 39-yard field goal, 12:31. Chiefs 10–0. **Drive: 8 plays, 37 yards, 3:47.**
- KC – Chris Martin 31-yard return of blocked punt (Nick Lowery kick), 4:54. Chiefs 17–0.
- KC – Emile Harry 6-yard pass from Steve DeBerg (Nick Lowery kick), 0:19. Chiefs 24–0. **Drive: 6 plays, 19 yards, 3:10.**

**Third quarter**

- KC – Nick Lowery 34-yard field goal, 2:18. Chiefs 27–0. **Drive: 7 plays, 64 yards, 4:49.**
- KC – Kevin Ross 4-yard return of blocked punt (Nick Lowery kick), 0:41. Chiefs 34–0.

**Fourth quarter**

- No scoring plays.

**Top passers**

- CLE – Mike Pagel – 14/27, 159 yards, INT
- KC – Steve DeBerg – 12/21, 189 yards, 2 TD

**Top rushers**

- CLE – Leroy Hoard – 11 rushes, 40 yards
- KC – Christian Okoye – 17 rushes, 41 yards

**Top receivers**

- CLE – Reggie Langhorne – 7 receptions, 82 yards
- KC – Stephone Paige – 4 receptions, 90 yards

==== Week 5: at Indianapolis Colts ====
Week 5: Kansas City Chiefs at Indianapolis Colts – Game summary

Quarter	1	2	3	4	Total
Chiefs	10	6	3	0	**19**
**Colts**	0	10	0	13	**23**

at Hoosier Dome, Indianapolis, Indiana

- Date: October 7
- Game time: 1:00 p.m. EDT/12:00 p.m. CDT
- Game weather: None (indoor stadium)
- Game attendance: 54,960
- Referee: Bob McElwee
- TV announcers (NBC): Charlie Jones and Todd Christensen
- Recap, Game Book

Game information

**First quarter**

- KC – Nick Lowery 37-yard field goal, 5:44. Chiefs 3–0. **Drive: 8 plays, 26 yards, 5:24.**
- KC – Robb Thomas 21-yard pass from Steve DeBerg (Nick Lowery kick), 2:40. Chiefs 10–0. **Drive: 3 plays, 20 yards, 1:22.**

**Second quarter**

- KC – Nick Lowery 39-yard field goal, 10:09. Chiefs 13–0. **Drive: 8 plays, 24 yards, 3:42.**
- IND – Dean Biasucci 38-yard field goal, 3:03. Chiefs 13–3. **Drive: 8 plays, 28 yards, 4:38.**
- IND – Albert Bentley 9-yard pass from Jack Trudeau (Dean Biasucci kick), 1:47. Chiefs 13–10. **Drive: 1 play, 9 yards, 0:06.**
- KC – Nick Lowery 44-yard field goal, 0:00. Chiefs 16–10. **Drive: 10 plays, 54 yards, 1:47.**

**Third quarter**

- KC – Nick Lowery 35-yard field goal, 3:27. Chiefs 19–10. **Drive: 9 plays, 29 yards, 4:06.**

**Fourth quarter**

- IND – Dean Biasucci 21-yard field goal, 12:31. Chiefs 19–13. **Drive: 7 plays, 84 yards, 2:42.**
- IND – Albert Bentley 10-yard run (Dean Biasucci kick), 5:53. Colts 20–19. **Drive: 4 plays, 21 yards, 1:37.**
- IND – Dean Biasucci 18-yard field goal, 0:23. Colts 23–19. **Drive: 4 plays, 3 yards, 1:48.**

**Top passers**

- KC – Steve DeBerg – 16/36, 212 yards, TD, 3 INT
- IND – Jack Trudeau – 18/28, 205 yards, TD, 2 INT

**Top rushers**

- KC – Christian Okoye – 23 rushes, 69 yards
- IND – Albert Bentley – 20 rushes, 84 yards, TD

**Top receivers**

- KC – Emile Harry – 4 receptions, 59 yards
- IND – Jessie Hester – 5 receptions, 95 yards

==== Week 6: vs. Detroit Lions ====
Week 6: Detroit Lions at Kansas City Chiefs – Game summary

Quarter	1	2	3	4	Total
Lions	14	0	0	10	**24**
**Chiefs**	3	14	12	14	**43**

at Arrowhead Stadium, Kansas City, Missouri

- Date: October 14
- Game time: 12:00 p.m. CDT
- Game weather: Clear, 66 °F (19 °C)
- Game attendance: 74,312
- Referee: Jerry Seeman
- TV announcers (CBS): Brad Nessler and Dan Jiggetts
- Recap, Game Book

Game information

**First quarter**

- KC – Nick Lowery 21-yard field goal, 9:30. Chiefs 3–0. **Drive: 9 plays, 70 yards, 5:30.**
- DET – Barry Sanders 47-yard pass Bob Gagliano (Rich Karlis kick), 9:07. Lions 7–3. **Drive: 1 play, 47 yards, 0:23.**
- DET – Barry Sanders 13-yard run (Rich Karlis kick), 2:02. Lions 14–3. **Drive: 7 plays, 60 yards, 4:40.**

**Second quarter**

- KC – Jonathan Hayes 1-yard pass Steve DeBerg (Nick Lowery kick), 11:39. Lions 14–10. **Drive: 10 plays, 79 yards, 5:23.**
- KC – Christian Okoye 4-yard run (Nick Lowery kick), 5:55. Chiefs 17–14. **Drive: 6 plays, 67 yards, 2:38.**

**Third quarter**

- KC – Nick Lowery 32-yard field goal, 9:47. Chiefs 20–14. **Drive: 7 plays, 20 yards, 2:54.**
- KC – Bob Gagliano sacked in end zone by Bill Maas for a Safety, 9:33. Chiefs 22–14.
- KC – Christian Okoye 1-yard run (Nick Lowery kick), 7:22. Chiefs 29–14. **Drive: 4 plays, 56 yards, 2:00.**

**Fourth quarter**

- DET – Rich Karlis 21-yard field goal, 11:49. Chiefs 29–17. **Drive: 10 plays, 72 yards, 4:16.**
- KC – Barry Word 53-yard run (Nick Lowery kick), 9:28. Chiefs 36–17. **Drive: 4 plays, 76 yards, 2:21.**
- DET – James Wilder 8-yard pass from Andre Ware (Rich Karlis kick), 6:26. Chiefs 36–24. **Drive: 7 plays, 62 yards, 3:02.**
- KC – Barry Word 1-yard run (Nick Lowery kick), 0:22. Chiefs 43–24. **Drive: 11 plays, 79 yards, 6:04.**

**Top passers**

- DET – Bob Gagliano – 8/17, 156 yards, TD, INT
- KC – Steve DeBerg – 15/26, 256 yards, TD

**Top rushers**

- DET – Barry Sanders – 16 rushes, 90 yards, TD
- KC – Barry Word – 18 rushes, 200 yards, 2 TD

**Top receivers**

- DET – Barry Sanders – 5 receptions, 135 yards, TD
- KC – Emile Harry – 4 receptions, 86 yards

==== Week 7: at Seattle Seahawks ====
Week 7: Kansas City Chiefs at Seattle Seahawks – Game summary

Quarter	1	2	3	4	Total
Chiefs	0	7	0	0	**7**
**Seahawks**	0	3	3	13	**19**

at Kingdome, Seattle, Washington

- Date: October 21
- Game time: 3:00 p.m. CDT/1:00 p.m. PDT
- Game weather: None (indoor stadium)
- Game attendance: 60,358
- Referee: Howard Roe
- TV announcers (NBC): Jim Donovan and Joe Namath
- Recap, Game Book

Game information

**First quarter**

- No scoring plays.

**Second quarter**

- KC – J. J. Birden 33-yard pass from Steve DeBerg (Nick Lowery kick), 0:58. Chiefs 7–0. **Drive: 10 plays, 91 yards, 3:11.**
- SEA – Norm Johnson 39-yard field goal, 0:00. Chiefs 7–3. **Drive: 6 plays, 24 yards, 0:58.**

**Third quarter**

- SEA – Norm Johnson 27-yard field goal, 2:06. Chiefs 7–6. **Drive: 7 plays, 26 yards, 3:10.**

**Fourth quarter**

- SEA – Norm Johnson 39-yard field goal, 9:25. Seahawks 9–7. **Drive: 11 plays, 56 yards, 4:59.**
- SEA – Norm Johnson 43-yard field goal, 3:00. Seahawks 12–7. **Drive: 8 plays, 20 yards, 4:30.**
- SEA – John Williams 4-yard run (Norm Johnson kick), 1:54. Seahawks 19–7. **Drive: 3 plays, 11 yards, 0:47.**

**Top passers**

- KC – Steve DeBerg – 23/34, 213 yards, TD
- SEA – Dave Krieg – 13/35, 132 yards, 4 INT

**Top rushers**

- KC – Barry Word – 7 rushes, 35 yards
- SEA – Derrick Fenner – 15 rushes, 75 yards

**Top receivers**

- KC – Stephone Paige – 9 receptions, 80 yards
- SEA – John Williams – 4 receptions, 52 yards

==== Week 9: vs. Los Angeles Raiders ====
Week 9: Los Angeles Raiders at Kansas City Chiefs – Game summary

Quarter	1	2	3	4	Total
Raiders	0	0	0	7	**7**
**Chiefs**	6	0	0	3	**9**

at Arrowhead Stadium, Kansas City, Missouri

- Date: November 4
- Game time: 12:00 p.m. CST
- Game weather: Cloudy, 37 °F (3 °C)
- Game attendance: 70,951
- Referee: Jim Tunney
- TV announcers (NBC): Dick Enberg and Bill Walsh
- Recap, Game Book

Game information

**First quarter**

- KC – Nick Lowery 36-yard field goal, 3:00. Chiefs 3–0. **Drive: 4 plays, –1 yard, 2:05.**
- KC – Nick Lowery 48-yard field goal, 0:06. Chiefs 6–0. **Drive: 4 plays, –7 yards, 2:39.**
- No scoring plays.

**Second quarter**

- No scoring plays.

**Third quarter**

- No scoring plays.

**Fourth quarter**

- RAI – Steve Smith 2-yard run (Jeff Jaeger kick), 14:58. Raiders 7–6. **Drive: 6 plays, 26 yards, 1:52.**
- KC – Nick Lowery 41-yard field goal, 11:58. Chiefs 9–7. **Drive: 6 plays, 42 yards, 3:00.**

**Top passers**

- RAI – Jay Schroeder – 10/31, 139 yards, INT
- KC – Steve DeBerg – 10/21, 59 yards

**Top rushers**

- RAI – Bo Jackson – 10 rushes, 40 yards
- KC – Barry Word – 15 rushes, 85 yards

**Top receivers**

- RAI – Willie Gault – 3 receptions, 55 yards
- KC – Alfredo Roberts – 3 receptions, 31 yards

==== Week 10: vs. Seattle Seahawks ====
Week 10: Seattle Seahawks at Kansas City Chiefs – Game summary

Quarter	1	2	3	4	Total
**Seahawks**	0	3	7	7	**17**
Chiefs	0	6	10	0	**16**

at Arrowhead Stadium, Kansas City, Missouri

- Date: November 11
- Game time: 12:00 p.m. CST
- Game weather: Clear, 63 °F (17 °C)
- Game attendance: 71,285
- Referee: Tom White
- TV announcers (NBC): Jim Donovan and Paul Maguire
- Recap, Game Book

Game information

**First quarter**

- No scoring plays.

**Second quarter**

- KC – Nick Lowery 25-yard field goal, 13:02. Chiefs 3–0. **Drive: 8 plays, 25 yards, 4:07.**
- SEA – Norm Johnson 43-yard field goal, 7:53. Tied 3–3. **Drive: 8 plays, 48 yards, 5:09.**
- KC – Nick Lowery 30-yard field goal, 0:07. Chiefs 6–3. **Drive: 10 plays, 54 yards, 1:32.**

**Third quarter**

- SEA – Jeff Chadwick 54-yard pass from Dave Krieg (Norm Johnson kick), 12:33. Seahawks 10–6. **Drive: 4 plays, 76 yards, 2:27.**
- KC – Nick Lowery 24-yard field goal, 2:46. Seahawks 10–9. **Drive: 15 plays, 74 yards, 9:39.**
- KC – Dan Saleaumua fumble recovery in endzone (Nick Lowery kick), 1:35. Chiefs 16–10.

**Fourth quarter**

- SEA – Paul Skansi 25-yard pass from Dave Krieg (Norm Johnson kick), 0:00. Seahawks 17–16. **Drive: 4 plays, 65 yards, 0:48.**

**Top passers**

- SEA – Dave Krieg – 16/23, 306 yards, 2 TD
- KC – Steve DeBerg – 16/30, 124 yards

**Top rushers**

- SEA – John Williams – 10 rushes, 36 yards
- KC – Christian Okoye – 21 rushes, 85 yards

**Top receivers**

- SEA – John Williams – 4 receptions, 89 yards
- KC – Robb Thomas – 7 receptions, 53 yards

==== Week 11: vs. San Diego Chargers ====
Week 11: San Diego Chargers at Kansas City Chiefs – Game summary

Quarter	1	2	3	4	Total
Chargers	3	0	7	0	**10**
**Chiefs**	10	7	3	7	**27**

at Arrowhead Stadium, Kansas City, Missouri

- Date: November 18
- Game time: 12:00 p.m. CST
- Game weather: Cloudy, 54 °F (12 °C)
- Game attendance: 63,717
- Referee: Dick Hantak
- TV announcers (NBC): Charlie Jones and Todd Christensen
- Recap, Game Book

Game information

**First quarter**

- KC – J. J. Birden 90-yard pass from Steve DeBerg (Nick Lowery kick), 5:31. Chiefs 7–0. **Drive: 3 plays, 92 yards, 1:49.**
- KC – Nick Lowery 36-yard field goal, 5:31. Chiefs 10–0. **Drive: 4 plays, –4 yards, 2:04.**
- SD – John Carney 36-yard field goal, 5:31. Chiefs 10–3. **Drive: 11 plays, 50 yards, 7:15.**

**Second quarter**

- KC – Bill Jones 2-yard pass from Steve DeBerg (Nick Lowery kick), 7:44. Chiefs 17–3. **Drive: 12 plays, 78 yards, 6:15.**

**Third quarter**

- SD – Derrick Walker 2-yard pass from Billy Joe Tolliver (John Carney kick), 8:43. Chiefs 17–10. **Drive: 12 plays, 80 yards, 6:17.**
- KC – Nick Lowery 37-yard field goal, 2:11. Chiefs 20–10. **Drive: 7 plays, 22 yards, 2:56.**

**Fourth quarter**

- KC – Bill Jones 6-yard pass from Steve DeBerg (Nick Lowery kick), 10:28. Chiefs 27–10. **Drive: 4 plays, 30 yards, 2:00.**

**Top passers**

- SD – Billy Joe Tolliver – 21/38, 203 yards, TD, 2 INT
- KC – Steve DeBerg – 11/24, 171 yards, 3 TD

**Top rushers**

- SD – Ronnie Harmon – 5 rushes, 41 yards
- KC – Barry Word – 17 rushes, 90 yards

**Top receivers**

- SD – Anthony Miller – 6 receptions, 93 yards
- KC – J. J. Birden – 1 reception, 90 yards, TD

==== Week 12: at Los Angeles Raiders ====
Week 12: Kansas City Chiefs at Los Angeles Raiders – Game summary

Quarter	1	2	3	4	Total
**Chiefs**	0	10	10	7	**27**
Raiders	0	10	7	7	**24**

at Los Angeles Memorial Coliseum, Los Angeles, California

- Date: November 25
- Game time: 3:00 p.m. CST/1:00 p.m. PST
- Game weather: Hazy, 78 °F (26 °C)
- Game attendance: 65,170
- Referee: Jerry Markbreit
- TV announcers (NBC): Dick Enberg and Bill Walsh
- Recap, Game Book

Game information

**First quarter**

- No scoring plays.

**Second quarter**

- KC – Nick Lowery 35-yard field goal, 12:11. Chiefs 3–0. **Drive: 6 plays, 18 yards, 2:39.**
- RAI – Marcus Allen 3-yard run (Jeff Jaeger kick), 9:14. Raiders 7–3. **Drive: 10 plays, 90 yards, 5:26.**
- KC – Emile Harry 19-yard pass from Steve DeBerg (Nick Lowery kick), 0:39. Chiefs 10–7. **Drive: 5 plays, 52 yards, 1:24.**
- RAI – Jeff Jaeger 50-yard field goal, 0:00. Tied 10–10. **Drive: 3 plays, 36 yards, 0:59.**

**Third quarter**

- KC – Bill Jones 11-yard pass from Steve DeBerg (Nick Lowery kick), 12:11. Chiefs 17–10. **Drive: 2 plays, 11 yards, 0:12.**
- RAI – Marcus Allen 10-yard run (Jeff Jaeger kick), 6:47. Tied 17–17. **Drive: 9 plays, 72 yards, 5:24.**
- KC – Nick Lowery 36-yard field goal, 0:51. Chiefs 20–17. **Drive: 9 plays, 71 yards, 5:56.**

**Fourth quarter**

- KC – Bill Jones 11-yard pass from Steve DeBerg (Nick Lowery kick), 6:32. Chiefs 27–17. **Drive: 9 plays, 73 yards, 5:27.**
- RAI – Marcus Allen 5-yard run (Jeff Jaeger kick), 4:19. Chiefs 27–24. **Drive: 5 plays, 81 yards, 2:13.**

**Top passers**

- KC – Steve DeBerg – 12/21, 149 yards, 3 TD
- RAI – Jay Schroeder – 9/18, 202 yards

**Top rushers**

- KC – Barry Word – 17 rushes, 52 yards
- RAI – Marcus Allen – 15 rushes, 76 yards, 3 TD

**Top receivers**

- KC – Stephone Paige – 3 receptions, 54 yards
- RAI – Ethan Horton – 4 receptions, 96 yards

==== Week 13: at New England Patriots ====
Week 13: Kansas City Chiefs at New England Patriots – Game summary

Quarter	1	2	3	4	Total
**Chiefs**	13	10	7	7	**37**
Patriots	0	0	7	0	**7**

at Foxboro Stadium, Foxborough, Massachusetts

- Date: November 25
- Game time: 1:00 p.m. EST/12:00 p.m. CST
- Game weather: Cloudy, 55 °F (13 °C)
- Game attendance: 26,280
- Referee: Bob McElwee
- TV announcers (NBC): Joel Meyers and Ahmad Rashad
- Recap, Game Book

Game information

**First quarter**

- KC – Stephone Paige 86-yard pass from Steve DeBerg (Nick Lowery kick), 14:39. Chiefs 7–0. **Drive: 1 play, 86 yards, 0:21.**
- KC – Nick Lowery 19-yard field goal, 8:55. Chiefs 10–0. **Drive: 7 plays, 70 yards, 3:52.**
- KC – Nick Lowery 32-yard field goal, 2:39. Chiefs 13–0. **Drive: 10 plays, 60 yards, 5:17.**

**Second quarter**

- KC – Nick Lowery 45-yard field goal, 11:33. Chiefs 16–0. **Drive: 7 plays, 59 yards, 3:11.**
- KC – Robb Thomas 11-yard pass from Steve DeBerg (Nick Lowery kick), 0:30. Chiefs 23–0. **Drive: 12 plays, 80 yards, 5:05.**

**Third quarter**

- KC – Christian Okoye 1-yard run (Nick Lowery kick), 9:52. Chiefs 30–0. **Drive: 2 plays, 14 yards, 0:42.**
- NE – Marv Cook 2-yard pass from Tommy Hodson (Jason Staurovsky kick), 0:25. Chiefs 30–7. **Drive: 12 plays, 53 yards, 4:47.**

**Fourth quarter**

- KC – Christian Okoye 1-yard run (Nick Lowery kick), 7:31. Chiefs 37–7. **Drive: 7 plays, 48 yards, 4:14.**

**Top passers**

- KC – Steve DeBerg – 15/21, 331 yards, 2 TD
- NE – Tommy Hodson – 20/39, 211 yards, TD, 2 INT

**Top rushers**

- KC – Barry Word – 19 rushes, 112 yards
- NE – John Stephens – 10 rushes, 33 yards

**Top receivers**

- KC – Stephone Paige – 7 receptions, 151 yards, TD
- NE – Irving Fryar – 5 receptions, 62 yards

==== Week 14: vs. Denver Broncos ====
Week 14: Denver Broncos at Kansas City Chiefs – Game summary

Quarter	1	2	3	4	Total
Broncos	0	13	0	7	**20**
**Chiefs**	7	3	7	14	**31**

at Arrowhead Stadium, Kansas City, Missouri

- Date: December 9
- Game time: 3:00 p.m. CST
- Game weather: Clear, 66 °F (19 °C)
- Game attendance: 74,347
- Referee: Gordon McCarter
- TV announcers (NBC): Charlie Jones and Bill Walsh
- Recap, Game Book

Game information

**First quarter**

- KC – Stephone Paige 48-yard pass from Steve DeBerg (Nick Lowery kick), 11:54. Chiefs 7–0. **Drive: 5 plays, 84 yards, 3:06.**

**Second quarter**

- DEN – Shannon Sharpe 5-yard pass from John Elway (kick failed, wide left), 7:46. Chiefs 7–6. **Drive: 8 plays, 53 yards, 4:53.**
- DEN – Mike Young 16-yard pass from John Elway (David Treadwell kick), 1:28. Broncos 13–7. **Drive: 11 plays, 85 yards, 4:16.**
- KC – Nick Lowery 33-yard field goal, 0:03. Broncos 13–10. **Drive: 8 plays, 58 yards, 1:25.**

**Third quarter**

- KC – Barry Word 1-yard run (Nick Lowery kick), 8:28. Chiefs 17–13. **Drive: 8 plays, 38 yards, 4:17.**

**Fourth quarter**

- KC – Danta Whitaker 1-yard pass from Steve DeBerg (Nick Lowery kick), 14:37. Chiefs 24–13. **Drive: 6 plays, 65 yards, 2:22.**
- DEN – Bobby Humphrey 2-yard run (David Treadwell kick), 9:51. Chiefs 24–20. **Drive: 7 plays, 43 yards, 4:30.**
- KC – Robb Thomas 27-yard pass from Steve DeBerg (Nick Lowery kick), 2:28. Chiefs 31–20. **Drive: 13 plays, 80 yards, 7:13.**

**Top passers**

- DEN – John Elway – 24/36, 328 yards, 2 TD, INT
- KC – Steve DeBerg – 18/27, 254 yards, 3 TD

**Top rushers**

- DEN – Bobby Humphrey – 21 rushes, 56 yards, TD
- KC – Barry Word – 16 rushes, 72 yards, TD

**Top receivers**

- DEN – Mark Jackson – 5 receptions, 90 yards
- KC – Stephone Paige – 3 receptions, 75 yards, TD

==== Week 15: vs. Houston Oilers ====
Week 15: Houston Oilers at Kansas City Chiefs – Game summary

Quarter	1	2	3	4	Total
**Oilers**	7	3	7	10	**27**
Chiefs	0	7	3	0	**10**

at Arrowhead Stadium, Kansas City, Missouri

- Date: December 16
- Game time: 12:00 p.m. CST
- Game weather: Cloudy, 38 °F (3 °C)
- Game attendance: 61,756
- Referee: Red Cashion
- TV announcers (NBC): Don Criqui and Bob Trumpy
- Recap, Game Book

Game information

**First quarter**

- HOU – Tony Jones 24-yard pass from Warren Moon (Teddy Garcia kick), 9:27. Oilers 7–0. **Drive: 6 plays, 85 yards, 2:15.**

**Second quarter**

- HOU – Teddy Garcia 32-yard field goal, 8:13. Oilers 10–0. **Drive: 9 plays, 49 yards, 5:47.**
- KC – J. J. Birden 62-yard pass from Steve DeBerg (Nick Lowery kick), 0:18. Oilers 10–7. **Drive: 2 plays, 74 yards, 0:15.**

**Third quarter**

- HOU – Haywood Jeffires 87-yard pass from Warren Moon (Teddy Garcia kick), 7:20. Oilers 17–7. **Drive: 3 plays, 92 yards, 1:44.**
- KC – Nick Lowery 35-yard field goal, 3:19. Oilers 17–10. **Drive: 8 plays, 48 yards, 4:01.**

**Fourth quarter**

- HOU – Teddy Garcia 26-yard field goal, 14:57. Oilers 20–10. **Drive: 6 plays, 68 yards, 3:22.**
- HOU – Tony Jones 2-yard pass from Warren Moon (Teddy Garcia kick), 8:32. Oilers 27–10. **Drive: 9 plays, 73 yards, 3:44.**

**Top passers**

- HOU – Warren Moon – 27/45, 527 yards, 3 TD
- KC – Steve DeBerg – 15/30, 241 yards, TD, INT

**Top rushers**

- HOU – Lorenzo White – 8 rushes, 32 yards
- KC – Barry Word – 19 rushes, 88 yards

**Top receivers**

- HOU – Haywood Jeffires – 9 receptions, 245 yards, TD
- KC – J. J. Birden – 2 receptions, 86 yards, TD

==== Week 16: at San Diego Chargers ====
Week 16: Kansas City Chiefs at San Diego Chargers – Game summary

Quarter	1	2	3	4	Total
**Chiefs**	7	14	0	3	**24**
Chargers	7	0	7	7	**21**

at Jack Murphy Stadium, San Diego, California

- Date: December 23
- Game time: 3:00 p.m. CST/1:00 p.m. PST
- Game weather: Clear, Cold, 53 °F (12 °C)
- Game attendance: 45,135
- Referee: Jerry Seeman
- TV announcers (NBC): Charlie Jones and Todd Christensen
- Recap, Game Book

Game information

**First quarter**

- KC – Stephone Paige 8-yard pass from Steve DeBerg (Nick Lowery kick), 8:54. Chiefs 7–0. **Drive: 9 plays, 64 yards, 6:06.**
- SD – Anthony Miller 14-yard pass from Billy Joe Tolliver (John Carney kick), 1:37. Tied 7–7. **Drive: 12 plays, 71 yards, 7:17.**

**Second quarter**

- KC – Barry Word 11-yard run (Nick Lowery kick), 11:12. Chiefs 14–7. **Drive: 9 plays, 77 yards, 5:25.**
- KC – Todd McNair 40-yard pass from Steve DeBerg (Nick Lowery kick), 1:08. Chiefs 21–7. **Drive: 9 plays, 78 yards, 4:53.**

**Third quarter**

- SD – Rod Bernstine 3-yard run (John Carney kick), 8:52. Chiefs 21–14. **Drive: 11 plays, 66 yards, 6:08.**

**Fourth quarter**

- SD – Kitrick Taylor 55-yard punt return (John Carney kick), 14:39. Tied 21–21.
- KC – Nick Lowery 32-yard field goal, 2:46. Chiefs 24–21. **Drive: 8 plays, 85 yards, 5:05.**

**Top passers**

- KC – Steve DeBerg – 19/27, 251 yards, 2 TD
- SD – Billy Joe Tolliver – 18/27, 165 yards, TD, 2 INT

**Top rushers**

- KC – Barry Word – 28 rushes, 106 yards, TD
- SD – Rod Bernstine – 15 rushes, 76 yards, TD

**Top receivers**

- KC – Todd McNair – 3 receptions, 111 yards, TD
- SD – Ronnie Harmon – 7 receptions, 72 yards

==== Week 17: at Chicago Bears ====
Week 17: Kansas City Chiefs at Chicago Bears – Game summary

Quarter	1	2	3	4	Total
**Chiefs**	6	6	6	3	**21**
Bears	3	7	0	0	**10**

at Soldier Field, Chicago, Illinois

- Date: December 29
- Game time: 11:30 a.m. CST
- Game weather: 44 °F (7 °C)
- Game attendance: 60,262
- Referee: Johnny Grier
- TV announcers (NBC): Marv Albert and Paul Maguire
- Recap, Game Book

Game information

**First quarter**

- KC – Nick Lowery 19-yard field goal, 9:50. Chiefs 3–0. **Drive: 8 plays, 69 yards, 5:10.**
- CHI – Kevin Butler 24-yard field goal, 3:56. Tied 3–3. **Drive: 12 plays, 69 yards, 5:54.**
- KC – Nick Lowery 30-yard field goal, 1:44. Chiefs 6–3. **Drive: 5 plays, 33 yards, 2:12.**

**Second quarter**

- KC – Nick Lowery 43-yard field goal, 6:57. Chiefs 9–3. **Drive: 12 plays, 55 yards, 7:09.**
- CHI – Johnny Bailey 95-yard punt return (Kevin Butler kick), 1:59. Bears 10–9.
- KC – Nick Lowery 32-yard field goal, 0:04. Chiefs 12–10. **Drive: 11 plays, 59 yards, 1:55.**

**Third quarter**

- KC – Christian Okoye 3-yard run (kick failed, wide right), 2:42. Chiefs 18–10. **Drive: 12 plays, 66 yards, 5:56.**

**Fourth quarter**

- KC – Nick Lowery 38-yard field goal, 9:12. Chiefs 21–10. **Drive: 4 plays, –2 yards, 2:13.**

**Top passers**

- KC – Steve DeBerg – 25/32, 276 yards
- CHI – Mike Tomczak – 5/23, 85 yards

**Top rushers**

- KC – Barry Word – 18 rushes, 73 yards
- CHI – Neal Anderson – 11 rushes, 68 yards

**Top receivers**

- KC – Todd McNair – 9 receptions, 69 yards
- CHI – Wendell Davis – 2 receptions, 50 yards

=== Standings ===
AFC West
	W	L	T	PCT	DIV	CONF	PF	PA	STK
^{(2)} Los Angeles Raiders	12	4	0	.750	6–2	9–3	337	268	W5
^{(5)} Kansas City Chiefs	11	5	0	.688	5–3	7–5	369	257	W2
Seattle Seahawks	9	7	0	.563	4–4	7–5	306	286	W2
San Diego Chargers	6	10	0	.375	2–6	5–9	315	281	L3
Denver Broncos	5	11	0	.313	3–5	4–8	331	374	W1

== Postseason ==
In a scene that would be repeated throughout the 1990s the Chiefs had a great regular season but fell short in the post-season. In the Wild Card playoff game, the Chiefs blew a 16–3 lead as the Dolphins scored two touchdowns to take a lead. With 2:28 left in the game, the Dolphins capped an 85-yard drive with quarterback Dan Marino's 12-yard touchdown pass to wide receiver Mark Clayton to take a 17-16 lead. The Chiefs had one last chance for a win, but Christian Okoye's long run was called back due to a questionable holding call. Kicker Nick Lowery, who had 139 points all season and a Pro Bowl berth missed a 52-yard field goal coming up two feet short, ending the Chiefs season.

=== Schedule ===
Round	Date	Opponent (seed)	Result	Record	Venue	Attendance	Recap
Wild Card	January 5, 1991	at Miami Dolphins (4)	L 16–17	0–1	Joe Robbie Stadium	67,276	Recap

=== Game summaries ===
==== AFC Wild Card Playoffs: at (4) Miami Dolphins ====
AFC Wild Card Playoffs: Kansas City Chiefs (5) at Miami Dolphins (4) – Game summary

Quarter	1	2	3	4	Total
Chiefs	3	7	6	0	16
Dolphins	0	3	0	14	17

at Joe Robbie Stadium, Miami, Florida

- Date: January 5
- Game time: 4:00 p.m. EST/3:00 p.m. CST
- Game weather: Partly Cloudy, 81 °F (27 °C)
- Game attendance: 67,276
- Referee: Pat Haggerty
- TV announcers (ABC): Al Michaels, Frank Gifford, Dan Dierdorf and Bob Griese
- Recap, Game Book

Game information

First quarter

- KC – Nick Lowery 27-yard field goal, 5:04. Chiefs 3–0. Drive: 9 plays, 28 yards, 3:55.

Second quarter

- MIA – Pete Stoyanovich 58-yard field goal, 14:55. Tied 3–3. Drive: 9 plays, 40 yards, 5:09.
- KC – Stephone Paige 26-yard pass from Steve DeBerg (Nick Lowery kick), 1:54. Chiefs 10–3. Drive: 4 plays, 61 yards, 1:42.

Third quarter

- KC – Nick Lowery 25-yard field goal, 4:46. Chiefs 13–3. Drive: 11 plays, 63 yards, 5:05.
- KC – Nick Lowery 38-yard field goal, 2:50. Chiefs 16–3. Drive: 4 plays, 8 yards, 1:39.

Fourth quarter

- MIA – Tony Paige 1-yard pass from Dan Marino (Pete Stoyanovich kick), 12:18. Chiefs 16–10. Drive: 10 plays, 66 yards, 5:32.
- MIA – Mark Clayton 10-yard pass from Dan Marino (Pete Stoyanovich kick), 3:28. Dolphins 17–16. Drive: 11 plays, 85 yards, 7:11.

Top passers

- KC – Steve DeBerg – 17/30, 269 yards, TD, INT
- MIA – Dan Marino – 19/30, 221 yards, 2 TD

Top rushers

- KC – Christian Okoye – 13 rushes, 83 yards
- MIA – Sammie Smith – 20 rushes, 82 yards

Top receivers

- KC – Stephone Paige – 8 receptions, 142 yards, TD
- MIA – Mark Clayton – 5 receptions, 66 yards, TD
