= Derrick Thomas Academy =

Closed school in Kansas City, Missouri, US

Location
- 201 East Armour Plaza; Kansas City, Missouri 64111; United States; 39°3′48″N 94°34′58″W

Information
- Type: Public charter school
- Established: June 3, 2001
- Closed: June 7, 2013
- Grades: Pre-Kindergarten–8
- Enrollment: c. 1000

The Derrick Thomas Academy was a tuition-free, public charter school in Kansas City, Missouri. It opened in 2001 and was named for former Kansas City Chiefs linebacker Derrick Thomas. As of the 2009–2010 school year, DTA served approximately 1,000 students in Grades PreK-8. It was an EdisonLearning charter school, but parted ways with EdisonLearning in 2011.

== History ==
Derrick Thomas established the Third and Long Foundation based in Kansas City in 1990 with a promise to “sack illiteracy” in the lives of the 9- to 13-year-old urban children in the program. After his death in 2000, EdisonLearning partnered with the Third and Long Foundation to open the Academy. On May 17, 2013, KSHB TV reported that the school will be closing as of June 7, 2013.

There were many factors as to why the Derrick Thomas Academy closed. One reported source stated that during 2011 Derrick Thomas Academy administration and governance did not report to its sponsor (University of Missouri at Kansas City) that they would part ways from Edison Learning. Due to the lack of communication, the University of Missouri at Kansas City put the school on probation in its ten-year charter with the school. Before the probation, during the 2008–2009 school year, when the school faced new administration and fired almost half of the faculty due to unforeseen issues, is when Derrick Thomas Academy encountered its reasons for closure. These include factors such as low test scores, lack of financial stability, and lack of governance. Even though Derrick Thomas Academy received many signs of possible closure, the school continued to do poorly. Finally an executive decision was made by the University of Missouri at Kansas City Charter School Center in May 2013, not to renew nor continue its remaining charter with Derrick Thomas Academy. During its last year the school was in crisis and didn't have its own administrator on site so the board asked another principal from a charter school in Kansas City to be an on site administrator for the school. After the school closed many of the faculty did not receive a final paycheck and the school board filed for Chapter 11 bankruptcy in a $10 million lawsuit that is currently pending.

== Partnerships ==
The Derrick Thomas Academy worked in partnership with the Kansas City Chiefs Football Association for whom the late football great Derrick Thomas played, the Derrick Thomas Third and Long Foundation, and the University of Missouri at Kansas City.
