= Derrick Thomas =

American football player (1967–2000)

- Thomas with the Kansas City Chiefs

No. 58
- Position: Linebacker

Personal information
- Born: January 1, 1967; Miami, Florida, U.S.
- Died: February 8, 2000 (aged 33); Miami, Florida, U.S.
- Listed height: 6 ft 3 in (1.91 m)
- Listed weight: 243 lb (110 kg)

Career information
- High school: South Miami Senior
- College: Alabama (1985–1988)
- NFL draft: 1989: 1st round, 4th overall pick

Career history
- Kansas City Chiefs (1989–1999)

Awards and highlights
- NFL Defensive Rookie of the Year (1989); NFL Man of the Year (1993); 2× First-team All-Pro (1990, 1991); 3× Second-team All-Pro (1993, 1994, 1996); 9× Pro Bowl (1989–1997); NFL sacks leader (1990); NFL 1990s All-Decade Team; PFWA All-Rookie Team (1989); "Whizzer" White NFL Man of the Year Award (1995); Kansas City Chiefs Hall of Fame; Kansas City Chiefs No. 58 retired; Butkus Award (1988); Unanimous All-American (1988); SEC Male Athlete of the Year (1989); 2× First-team All-SEC (1987, 1988); First-team AP All-Time All-American (2025); NFL record: Most sacks in a game: 7

Career NFL statistics
- Tackles: 641
- Sacks: 126.5
- Safeties: 3
- Forced fumbles: 41
- Fumble recoveries: 19
- Interceptions: 1
- Defensive touchdowns: 4
- Stats at Pro Football Reference
- Pro Football Hall of Fame
- College Football Hall of Fame

Derrick Vincent Thomas (January 1, 1967 – February 8, 2000) was an American professional football linebacker for the Kansas City Chiefs of the National Football League (NFL). Nicknamed "D. T.", he played 11 seasons with the Chiefs until his death in 2000. He is considered one of the greatest pass rushers of all time.

Thomas played college football for the Alabama Crimson Tide, winning the Butkus Award in 1988. He was selected fourth overall in the 1989 NFL draft by the Chiefs, where he received nine Pro Bowl and two first-team All-Pro selections. Thomas also set the single-game sacks record in 1990.

After the Chiefs' 1999 season, Thomas was rendered paraplegic in a car crash and died two weeks later from a pulmonary embolism. He was posthumously inducted to the Pro Football Hall of Fame in 2009 and the College Football Hall of Fame in 2014. He is the only NFL player in history to die during their career and later be inducted into the Hall of Fame.

== Early life ==
Born on January 1, 1967, in Miami, Florida, Thomas was raised by his mother Edith Morgan. His father, Air Force Captain and B-52 pilot Robert James Thomas, died during a mission in the Vietnam War when Derrick was five years old. Thomas played his high school football at South Miami Senior High School.

== College career ==
Alongside Cornelius Bennett and later Keith McCants at Alabama, Thomas spearheaded one of the best defensive lines in college football and smashed many Crimson Tide defensive records, including sacks in a single season (27.0 in 1988). He was awarded the Butkus Award in 1988. He was also selected as a consensus All-American at the conclusion of the 1988 season, a season which culminated in the Crimson Tide's thrilling 29–28 victory over Army in the 1988 Sun Bowl. In 2000, Thomas was named a Sun Bowl Legend. He was awarded the Sington Soaring Spirit Award by the Lakeshore Foundation. This annual award is named for University of Alabama football legend Fred Sington. Thomas was posthumously inducted to the College Football Hall of Fame in 2014.

== Professional career ==
Pre-draft measurables
Height	Weight	40-yard dash	10-yard split	20-yard split
6 ft 2 1/2 in (1.89 m)	234 lb (106 kg)	4.58 s	1.55 s	2.68 s

Thomas was selected fourth overall in the first round of the 1989 NFL draft by the Kansas City Chiefs. He was the first selection made by new head coach Marty Schottenheimer.

Thomas would record his first career sack in the Chiefs week 2 game against the Los Angeles Raiders. That game was also his first multi-sack game as he finished with 2.5 sacks. He would record another 7.5 sacks that season finishing with 10 his rookie year. He was named AP Defensive Rookie of the Year. He was also named to the Pro Bowl.

In his second year, Thomas recorded at least a half of a sack in each of the Chiefs first 5 games. In the Chiefs week 10 game against the Seattle Seahawks, he broke Fred Dean's 7-year-old record of sacks in a single game with 7 sacks. The quarterback he sacked in that game, Dave Krieg, would become his teammate 2 seasons later. However, on the game's final play, Thomas had a clear shot for an eighth sack, but missed it and the Seahawks would throw a game winning touchdown after the missed sack. He would later call that play the one play in his career he wished he could have a second chance at. He would finish the season with what would prove to be a career high 20 sacks, setting a franchise record that stood until it was broken by Justin Houston in 2014. He finished 2nd in defensive player of the year voting and was named 1st team All-Pro.

The following season, he would record his first career touchdown on a 23-yard fumble return for a touchdown in the Chiefs week 11 game against the Los Angeles Rams.

Thomas would record double digits sacks for each of the first four seasons in his career. In total, 7 of his 11 seasons in the NFL he recorded double digit sack totals.

In the Chiefs 1999 season, Thomas recorded a career low for sacks with 7. He would also record his first career interception in the Chiefs week 8 win over the San Diego Chargers. He would record the final sack of his career in the Chiefs week 15 against the Pittsburgh Steelers. In what would be the final game of his career, as he would die 37 days later, the Chiefs played their rival the Oakland Raiders. With a victory in the game, the Chiefs would qualify for the playoffs. The Chiefs lost in overtime 41–38. He did not manage to record a sack on his former teammate Rich Gannon, but he did record 6 total tackles.

=== Legacy ===
Thomas was named first-team All-Pro two times and was named to the Pro Bowl nine times. He is 18th all-time in sacks and at the time of his death in 2000, he was 9th all-time with 126.5. He remains the Chiefs' all-time leader in sacks, safeties, forced fumbles, and fumble recoveries. During his career, he recorded 1 interception and recovered 19 fumbles, returning them for 161 yards and 4 touchdowns. Thomas said in interviews his favorite quarterback to sack was Denver Broncos quarterback John Elway, whom he sacked 26 times. The sack total over Elway is most against any quarterback in Thomas' career and the most of any individual player who sacked Elway. He was posthumously inducted into the Chiefs Hall of Fame in 2000, with the Chiefs breaking the tradition of waiting four years after the end of the player's career. In 2009, he was posthumously inducted into the Pro Football Hall of Fame. Later that same year, the Chiefs retired the number 58 in honor of him. Following his death until it was officially retired, the Chiefs did not reissue the number. The Chiefs also named their player of the year award in Thomas' honor, an award he won twice himself prior to the award being named in his honor. He is the only NFL player to die during their career that was later inducted to the Hall of Fame.

== NFL career statistics ==
Legend
	Led the league
**Bold**	Career high

Year	Team	Games		Tackles					Fumbles				
Year	Team	GP	GS	Cmb	Solo	Ast	Sck	Sfty	FF	FR	Yds	TD	Blk
1989	KC	16	16	75	56	**19**	10.0	0	3	1	0	0	0
1990	KC	15	15	63	47	16	**20.0**	0	6	2	14	0	0
1991	KC	16	15	**79**	60	**19**	13.5	0	4	**4**	23	**1**	0
1992	KC	16	16	67	54	13	14.5	0	**8**	3	0	**1**	0
1993	KC	16	15	43	32	11	8.0	0	4	1	**86**	**1**	0
1994	KC	16	15	71	**67**	4	11.0	**1**	3	3	11	0	0
1995	KC	15	15	53	48	5	8.0	0	2	1	0	0	0
1996	KC	16	14	55	49	6	13.0	0	4	1	0	0	**1**
1997	KC	12	10	34	30	4	9.5	**1**	3	0	0	0	0
1998	KC	15	10	42	35	7	12.0	**1**	2	2	27	**1**	0
1999	KC	16	16	60	54	6	7.0	0	2	1	0	0	0
Career		169	157	642	532	110	126.5	3	41	19	161	4	1

== Death ==
On January 23, 2000, Thomas's SUV went off Interstate 435 in Clay County as he and two passengers were driving to Kansas City International Airport during a snowstorm for a flight to St. Louis to see the NFC Championship Game between the St. Louis Rams and the Tampa Bay Buccaneers. Police reports indicated that Thomas, who was driving, was speeding at approximately 70 mph even though snow and ice were rapidly accumulating on the roadway. Thomas and one of the passengers were not wearing seat belts and both were thrown from the car; that passenger, Michael Tellis, was killed instantly. The second passenger, who was wearing his safety belt, walked away from the scene uninjured. Thomas was left paralyzed from the chest down. By early February, Thomas was being treated at Miami's Jackson Memorial Hospital. The morning of February 8, 2000, while being transferred from his hospital bed to a wheelchair on his way to therapy, Thomas told his mother he was not feeling well. Frank Eismont, an orthopedic surgeon at Jackson Memorial Hospital said Thomas went into cardiorespiratory arrest and died as a result of a pulmonary embolism, a massive blood clot that developed in his legs and traveled to his lungs. Months later, Thomas's family sued General Motors for $73 million in damages stemming from the accident. In 2004, a jury ruled that the family was not entitled to any money.

== Charity work ==
In 1990, Thomas founded the Derrick Thomas Third and Long Foundation. The foundation's mission is to "sack illiteracy" and change the lives of 9- to 13-year-old urban children facing challenging and life-threatening situations in the Kansas City area.

The Derrick Thomas Academy, a charter school in Kansas City, Missouri, opened in September 2001. It served nearly 1,000 children from kindergarten through eighth grade until it closed in 2013.

== See also ==
- List of gridiron football players who died during their careers
