= Stacy Harvey =

American football player (1965-2019)

No. 59
- Position: Linebacker

Personal information
- Born: March 8, 1965; San Diego County, California, U.S.
- Died: July 28, 2019 (aged 54)
- Listed height: 6 ft 4 in (1.93 m)
- Listed weight: 245 lb (111 kg)

Career information
- High school: Pasadena
- College: Arizona State
- NFL draft: 1988: undrafted

Career history
- Los Angeles Raiders (1988)*; New Orleans Saints (1989)*; Kansas City Chiefs (1989); Miami Dolphins (1990)*; San Francisco 49ers (1991)*; Ohio Glory (1992)
- * Offseason or practice squad member only
- Stats at Pro Football Reference

Stacy Lamonte Harvey (March 8, 1965 – July 28, 2019) was an American professional football linebacker who played for the Kansas City Chiefs of the National Football League (NFL). He played college football at Arizona State University.
