= Michael Harris (offensive lineman, born 1966) =

American football player (born 1966)

No. 73
- Positions: Center, guard

Personal information
- Born: August 30, 1966 (age 60); Shreveport, Louisiana, U.S.
- Listed height: 6 ft 4 in (1.93 m)
- Listed weight: 306 lb (139 kg)

Career information
- High school: Booker T. Washington (Shreveport)
- College: Grambling State
- NFL draft: 1989: undrafted

Career history
- Kansas City Chiefs (1989); Montreal Machine (1991)
- Stats at Pro Football Reference

Anthony Michael Harris (born August 30, 1966) is an American former football center and guard who played for the Kansas City Chiefs of the National Football League (NFL). He played college football for the Grambling State Tigers.
