= Stan Petry =

American football player (born 1966)

No. 45, 6
- Position: Defensive back

Personal information
- Born: August 14, 1966 (age 60); Alvin, Texas, U.S.
- Listed height: 5 ft 11 in (1.80 m)
- Listed weight: 174 lb (79 kg)

Career information
- High school: Willowridge (Houston, Texas)
- College: TCU
- NFL draft: 1989: 4th round, 88th overall pick

Career history
- Kansas City Chiefs (1989–1991); New Orleans Saints (1991); Houston Oilers (1993)*; Baltimore Stallions (1994); Milwaukee Mustangs (1995–1997); Albany Firebirds (1998); Grand Rapids Rampage (1998–1999); Houston ThunderBears (1999); Buffalo Destroyers (2000); Houston ThunderBears (2000); New York Dragons (2001)
- * Offseason or practice squad member only

Career NFL statistics
- Interceptions: 4
- Sacks: 0.5
- Touchdowns: 1
- Stats at Pro Football Reference

Career AFL statistics
- Tackles: 182
- Interceptions: 9
- Stats at ArenaFan.com

Stanley Edward Petry (born August 14, 1966) is an American former professional football player who was a defensive back in the National Football League (NFL), Canadian Football League (CFL), and Arena Football League (AFL). He played college football for the TCU Horned Frogs. Petry was selected by the Kansas City Chiefs in the fourth round of the 1989 NFL draft. He also played for the Baltimore Stallions of the CFL and Milwaukee Mustangs, Albany Firebirds, Grand Rapids Rampage, Houston ThunderBears, Buffalo Destroyers and New York Dragons of the AFL.
