= Rob McGovern =

American football player (born 1966)

No. 50, 56, 58
- Position: Linebacker

Personal information
- Born: October 1, 1966 (age 60); Teaneck, New Jersey, U.S.
- Listed height: 6 ft 2 in (1.88 m)
- Listed weight: 225 lb (102 kg)

Career information
- High school: Bergen Catholic (Oradell, New Jersey)
- College: Holy Cross
- NFL draft: 1989: 10th round, 255th overall pick

Career history
- Kansas City Chiefs (1989–1990); Pittsburgh Steelers (1991); New England Patriots (1992)

Career NFL statistics
- Safeties: 1
- Stats at Pro Football Reference

Robert Patrick McGovern (born October 1, 1966) is an American former professional football player who was a linebacker in the National Football League (NFL) for the Kansas City Chiefs, Pittsburgh Steelers and New England Patriots. He played college football for the Holy Cross Crusaders.

Raised in Oradell, New Jersey, as one of nine children, McGovern played prep football at Bergen Catholic High School. In college, McGovern was a standout linebacker for Holy Cross during the late 1980s. He earned first-team All-America honors as a senior, in addition to being named the Colonial League Defensive Player of the Year, receiving the George H. "Bulger" Lowe Award and taking home the New England Football Writers Gold Helmet. McGovern was also a two-time first-team All-New England, All-ECAC and All-Colonial League selection. He totaled 443 tackles over the course of his collegiate career, including a school-record 182 tackles as a senior in 1988. McGovern was a part of teams which compiled an overall record of 34–9–1, including three Lambert Cup winners (1986, 1987, 1988), two Colonial League champions (1986, 1987) and the undefeated 1987 squad which was ranked No. 1 in the final NCAA Division I-AA national poll.

In the NFL, McGovern played linebacker and special teams in 46 games for the Chiefs, Steelers and Patriots. McGovern started 2 games at linebacker for the Kansas City Chiefs in his first season (1989) and he also led the Chiefs in special teams tackles that same rookie season. In his four NFL seasons, McGovern made a total of 43 tackles on special teams and 25 tackles on defense for 68 career tackles in the NFL. McGovern also blocked one punt against the Dallas Cowboys (1989) and scored a safety.

After retiring from the NFL, McGovern attended Fordham University School of Law and worked as a prosecutor in the New York County District Attorney's office. Following the September 11 attacks, McGovern volunteered to serve on active duty with the United States Army where he deployed to both Afghanistan and Iraq. In Iraq, McGovern prosecuted captured insurgents and foreign fighters in the Central Criminal Court of Iraq. McGovern also served as an Army Judge Advocate and military prosecutor for the U.S. Army's 18th Airborne Corps at Fort Bragg, North Carolina. McGovern prosecuted several capital murder cases and other violent crimes as an Army prosecutor and, in 2012, McGovern was assigned to the Military Commissions with duty in Guantanamo Bay, Cuba where he worked on the case against alleged mastermind of the 9/11 attacks Khalid Sheikh Mohammed and four others. McGovern is also a published author of the book All American: Football, Faith and Fighting for Freedom.

McGovern has two brothers who have professional sports backgrounds as well. McGovern's brother Jim was a member of the PGA Tour from 1991 to 1998. Jim's career year was 1993 when he won one PGA tour event and had two other top-10 finishes. Jim's best finish in a major was a tie for 5th at the 1994 Masters Tournament and he had 14 career top-10 finishes in 386 PGA Tour events. His brother Bill became an NFL and college coach.
