= Emile Harry =

American football player (born 1963)

No. 86, 22
- Position: Wide receiver

Personal information
- Born: April 5, 1963 (age 63); Los Angeles, California, U.S.
- Listed height: 5 ft 11 in (1.80 m)
- Listed weight: 175 lb (79 kg)

Career information
- High school: Fountain Valley (Fountain Valley, California)
- College: Stanford
- NFL draft: 1985: 4th round, 89th overall pick

Career history
- Atlanta Falcons (1985)*; Kansas City Chiefs (1986–1992); Los Angeles Rams (1992); Denver Broncos (1993)*
- * Offseason or practice squad member only

Awards and highlights
- Second-team All-Pac-10 (1983)

Career NFL statistics
- Receptions: 150
- Receiving yards: 2,011
- Touchdowns: 9
- Stats at Pro Football Reference

Emile Michael Harry (born April 5, 1963) is an American former professional football player who was a wide receiver for seven seasons in the National Football League (NFL). He played college football for the Stanford Cardinal. Harry played in the NFL with the Kansas City Chiefs from 1986 to 1992 and Los Angeles Rams in 1992.

== Biography ==
Harry was born in Los Angeles and graduated from Fountain Valley High School in Fountain Valley, California. As a senior, Harry caught 52 passes for 1,130 yards and 12 touchdowns and was named CIF Southern Section Division I Player of the Year after leading the Barons to the Big Five Conference championship game. He played college football at Stanford University, playing as a true freshman where Harry became a top target for Cardinal quarterback John Elway. Harry earned second-team All-Pac-10 Conference honors as a junior in 1983.

Selected by the Atlanta Falcons in the fourth round (89th overall) of the 1985 NFL draft, Harry never played for Atlanta as a rookie, and prior to the 1986 season was signed as a free agent by the Kansas City Chiefs during the 1986 season. He would play seven seasons for the Chiefs, and after being cut midway through 1992, played briefly for the Los Angeles Rams at the end of that season. Harry's professional career ended after being cut by the Denver Broncos prior to the 1993 NFL season. He finished with 150 receptions for 2,011 yards and nine touchdowns.
