= Bill Jones (running back) =

American football player (born 1966)

No. 43
- Position: Fullback

Personal information
- Born: September 10, 1966 (age 60); Abilene, Texas, U.S.
- Listed height: 5 ft 11 in (1.80 m)
- Listed weight: 228 lb (103 kg)

Career information
- High school: Corsicana (Corsicana, Texas)
- College: Tyler JC (1985–1986); SMU (1987); Southwest Texas State (1988)
- NFL draft: 1989: 12th round, 311th overall pick

Career history
- Kansas City Chiefs (1989–1992)

Career NFL statistics
- Rushing yards: 47
- Rushing average: 4.7
- Receptions: 35
- Receiving yards: 240
- Touchdowns: 6
- Stats at Pro Football Reference

William Jones Jr. (born September 10, 1966) is an American former professional football player who was a fullback for three seasons with the Kansas City Chiefs of the National Football League (NFL). He was selected by the Chiefs in the 12th round of the 1989 NFL draft. He played college football at Tyler Junior College, Southern Methodist University, and Southwest Texas State University.

== Early life and college ==
William Jones Jr. was born on September 10, 1966, in Abilene, Texas. He attended Corsicana High School in Corsicana, Texas.

He first played college football at Tyler Junior College from 1985 to 1986. He transferred to play for the SMU Mustangs of Southern Methodist University in 1987. He transferred again in 1988 to play for the Southwest Texas State Bobcats of Southwest Texas State University, where he was a letterman in 1988.

== Professional career ==
Jones was selected by the Kansas City Chiefs in the 12th round, with the 311th overall pick, of the 1989 NFL draft. He officially signed with the team on July 20. He was released on August 29 but later signed to the team's practice squad on October 25, 1989. He was released again on January 18, 1990, and later re-signed on February 6, 1990. Jones played in all 16 games, starting five, for the Chiefs during the 1990 season, recording ten carries for 47 yards and 19 receptions for 137 yards and five touchdowns. He also appeared in one playoff game that season. He was placed on the reserve/suspended list on August 19, 1991, but was later activated on September 4, 1991. He played in 15 games, starting 14, in 1991, catching 14 passes for 97 yards and one touchdown. The Chiefs finished with a 10–6 record that season, defeating the Los Angeles Raiders in the wild card round before losing to the Buffalo Bills in the divisional round of the playoffs. Jones appeared in the first six games of the 1992 season before being released on October 14, 1992. He was re-signed on November 11 and played in one more game before being released for the final time on November 20, 1992. Overall, he caught two passes for five yards and started six games that season.
